= 2013 Energiewacht Tour =

Race details
- Dates: 3–7 April 2013
- Stages: 6
- Distance: 548.6 km (340.9 mi)
- Winning time: 14h 28' 53"

Results
Jersey awarded to the overall winner	Winner	Ellen van Dijk (NED)	(Specialized–lululemon)
	Second	Loes Gunnewijk (NED)	(Orica–AIS)
	Third	Kirsten Wild (NED)	(Team Argos–Shimano)
Jersey awarded to the points classification winner	Points	Kirsten Wild (NED)	(Team Argos–Shimano)
Jersey awarded to the young rider classification winner	Young rider	Jolanda Neff (SUI)	(Rabobank-Liv Giant)
Jersey awarded to the sprints classification winner	Sprints	Anna van der Breggen (NED)	(Sengers Ladies Cycling Team)
	Team	Orica–AIS	

The 2013 Energiewacht Tour is the third edition of the Energiewacht Tour women's cycling stage race. It is rated by the UCI as category 2.2, and is held between 3 and 7 April 2013 in the Netherlands. Twenty-four teams of 6 riders take part. There is also an Energiewacht Tour for junior riders from 5 to 7 April 2013.

== Teams ==
24 teams of maximal 6 riders take part.

UCI teams

- Rabobank-Liv Giant
- Specialized–lululemon
- Orica–AIS
- Hitec Products–UCK
- Boels–Dolmans Cycling Team
- MCipollini–Giordana
- Lotto–Belisol Ladies
- Team Argos–Shimano
- Wiggle–Honda
- Sengers Ladies Cycling Team

National teams

- National Team Belgium
- National Team Germany
- National Team USA
- National Team Switzerland

Other teams

- Parkhotel Valkenburg Cycling Team
- Team Futurumshop.nl
- Team CTC
- Bigla Cycling Team
- Bike4Air NWV Groningen
- Rabo Plieger van Arckel
- Water, Land en Dijken
- Restore Cycling Mix
- Ronald Mc Donald huis Groningen

== Stages ==
=== Stage 1 ===
3 April 2013 – Winschoten (Oldambt) to Winschoten, 104.3 km (64.8 mi)

The race consisted of three laps around Bad Nieuweschans and 3 laps around Winschoten. The mayor of Oldambt, Pieter Smit, started the race. The race included two bonification sprints. Lisa Brennauer won the first one, ahead of Ellen van Dijk and Adrie Visser. Visser won the second one ahead of Trixi Worrack and Annemiek van Vleuten. In Bad Nieuweschans the bunch split into three groups. The first group had a 1' 25" seconds gap on the second group before they were sent into the wrong direction. The race was neutralized and the first group got the 1' 25" seconds lead. After that some roads were not properly closed anymore and cars rode over the course. Due to the dangerous situation the women's stopped riding. After a while they continuead riding but later on they had to wait for an open bridge. A protest of the women's followed and with one lap to go the ladies stopped at the start/finish in Winschoten. Some of them wanted to abandon the race but after intense discussions with the organisation the ladies started again with the original time differences between the groups. In the final lap the front group split with a small group of 4 leaders in the front. Kirsten Wild won the side by side sprint of Ellen van Dijk. Iris Slappendel finished in third place.

Stage 1 result

	Rider	Team	Time
1	Kirsten Wild (NED)	Team Argos–Shimano	3h 10' 02"
2	Ellen van Dijk (NED)	Specialized–lululemon	s.t.
3	Iris Slappendel (NED)	Rabobank-Liv Giant	+ 3"
4	Loes Gunnewijk (NED)	Orica–AIS	+ 3"
5	Adrie Visser (NED)	Boels–Dolmans Cycling Team	+ 10"

General classification after stage 1

	Rider	Team	Time
1	Kirsten Wild (NED)	Team Argos–Shimano	3h 09' 52"
2	Ellen van Dijk (NED)	Specialized–lululemon	+ 2"
3	Iris Slappendel (NED)	Rabobank-Liv Giant	+ 9"
4	Loes Gunnewijk (NED)	Orica–AIS	+ 13"
3	Adrie Visser (NED)	Boels–Dolmans Cycling Team	+ 16"

s.t. = same time

=== Stage 2 ===
4 April 2013 – Pekela to Veendam, 105.5 km (65.6 mi)

Pekela was the start and Veendam the finish place of the team time trial in the 2012 Energiewacht Tour. Now the riders rode the same course in a regular race. After three laps in Pekela the riders rode to Veendam for four local laps there. During the local laps in Pekela the peloton split in different groups, with a front group of 13 riders. Annemiek van Vleuten got punctured and could not reach the front group during the race. From the stage 1 top-10 of also Christine Majerus was not in the first group. In the final kilometers there were a lot of attacks, but were pulled back. Kirsten Wild pulled back the last one of Lisa Brennauer and won the sprint ahead of Chloe Hosking and Adrie Visser.

Stage 2 result

	Rider	Team	Time
1	Kirsten Wild (NED)	Team Argos–Shimano	2h 39' 37"
2	Chloe Hosking (AUS)	Hitec Products UCK	s.t.
3	Adrie Visser (NED)	Boels–Dolmans Cycling Team	s.t.
4	Lisa Brennauer (GER)	Specialized–lululemon	s.t.
5	Ellen van Dijk (NED)	Specialized–lululemon	s.t.

General classification after stage 2

	Rider	Team	Time
1	Kirsten Wild (NED)	Team Argos–Shimano	5h 49' 16"
2	Ellen van Dijk (NED)	Specialized–lululemon	+ 13"
3	Adrie Visser (NED)	Boels–Dolmans Cycling Team	+ 22"
4	Iris Slappendel (NED)	Rabobank-Liv Giant	+ 22"
5	Loes Gunnewijk (NED)	Orica–AIS	+ 24"

s.t. = same time

=== Stage 3a ===
5 April 2013 – Winsum to Winsum (individual time trial), 21.1 km (13.1 mi)

Winsum will be also the host city for 2013 Dutch National Time Trial Championships and the course of both time trials is probably the same. Ellen van Dijk won the time trial with nearly a minute ahead of Lisa Brennauer and Shara Gillow who finished second and third. Van Dijk took over the lead in the general classification from Kirsten Wild who finished 9th at 1' 54".

Stage 3a result

	Rider	Team	Time
1	Ellen van Dijk (NED)	Specialized–lululemon	28' 12"
2	Lisa Brennauer (GER)	Specialized–lululemon	+ 52"
3	Shara Gillow (AUS)	Orica–AIS	+ 57"
4	Loes Gunnewijk (NED)	Orica–AIS	+ 1' 07"
5	Trixi Worrack (GER)	Specialized–lululemon	+ 1' 22"

General classification after stage 3a

	Rider	Team	Time
1	Ellen van Dijk (NED)	Specialized–lululemon	6h 17' 41"
2	Lisa Brennauer (GER)	Specialized–lululemon	+ 1' 07"
3	Loes Gunnewijk (NED)	Orica–AIS	+ 1' 18"
4	Trixi Worrack (GER)	Specialized–lululemon	+ 1' 40"
5	Kirsten Wild (NED)	Team Argos–Shimano	+ 1' 41"

=== Stage 3b ===
5 April 2013 – Appingedam to Appingedam, 77.3 km (48.0 mi)

Stage 3b result

	Rider	Team	Time
1	Kirsten Wild (NED)	Team Argos–Shimano	1h 57' 52"
2	Jolien D'Hoore (BEL)	Lotto–Belisol Ladies	s.t.
3	Chloe Hosking (AUS)	Hitec Products UCK	s.t.
4	Annette Edmondson (AUS)	Orica–AIS	s.t.
5	Laura Trott (GBR)	Wiggle–Honda	s.t.

General classification after stage 3b

	Rider	Team	Time
1	Ellen van Dijk (NED)	Specialized–lululemon	6h 17' 41"
2	Lisa Brennauer (GER)	Specialized–lululemon	+ 1' 07"
3	Loes Gunnewijk (NED)	Orica–AIS	+ 1' 16"
4	Kirsten Wild (NED)	Team Argos–Shimano	+ 1' 32"
5	Trixi Worrack (GER)	Specialized–lululemon	+ 1' 40"

s.t. = same time

=== Stage 4 ===
6 April 2013 – Eemsmond to Uithuizen, 134.6 km (83.6 mi)

Stage 4 result

	Rider	Team	Time
1	Kirsten Wild (NED)	Team Argos–Shimano	3h 36' 43"
2	Ellen van Dijk (NED)	Specialized–lululemon	s.t.
3	Adrie Visser (NED)	Boels–Dolmans Cycling Team	s.t.
4	Jolien D'Hoore (BEL)	Lotto–Belisol Ladies	s.t.
5	Lucinda Brand (NED)	Rabobank-Liv Giant	s.t.

General classification after stage 4

	Rider	Team	Time
1	Ellen van Dijk (NED)	Specialized–lululemon	11h 52' 10"
2	Loes Gunnewijk (NED)	Orica–AIS	+ 1' 22"
3	Kirsten Wild (NED)	Team Argos–Shimano	+ 1' 25"
4	Lisa Brennauer (GER)	Specialized–lululemon	+ 1' 51"
5	Adrie Visser (NED)	Boels–Dolmans Cycling Team	+ 2' 46"

s.t. = same time

=== Stage 5 ===
7 April 2013 – Groningen to Groningen, 100.5 km (62.4 mi)

Stage 5 result

	Rider	Team	Time
1	Valentina Carretta (ITA)	MCipollini–Giordana	
2	Gu Sunguen (KOR)	Orica–AIS	
3	Romy Kasper (GER)	Boels–Dolmans Cycling Team	
4	Amy Pieters (NED)	Team Argos–Shimano	
5	Maaike Polspoel (NED)	Sengers Ladies Cycling Team	

General classification after stage 5

	Rider	Team	Time
1	Ellen van Dijk (NED)	Specialized–lululemon	14h 28' 53"
2	Loes Gunnewijk (NED)	Orica–AIS	+ 1' 21"
3	Kirsten Wild (NED)	Team Argos–Shimano	+ 1' 22"
4	Lisa Brennauer (GER)	Specialized–lululemon	+ 1' 51"
5	Adrie Visser (NED)	Boels–Dolmans Cycling Team	+ 2' 44"

== Final classifications ==
=== General classification ===
	Rider	Team	Time
1	Ellen van Dijk (NED)	Specialized–lululemon	14h 28' 53"
2	Loes Gunnewijk (NED)	Orica–AIS	+ 1' 21"
3	Kirsten Wild (NED)	Team Argos–Shimano	+ 1' 22"
4	Lisa Brennauer (GER)	Specialized–lululemon	+ 1' 51"
5	Adrie Visser (NED)	Boels–Dolmans Cycling Team	+ 2' 44"
6	Gracie Elvin (NED)	Orica–AIS	+ 2' 48"
7	Lizzie Armitstead (GBR)	Boels–Dolmans Cycling Team	+ 3' 09"
8	Iris Slappendel (NED)	Rabobank-Liv Giant	+ 3' 40"
9	Sanne van Paassen (NED)	Rabobank-Liv Giant	+ 3' 54"
10	Anna van der Breggen (NED)	Sengers Ladies Cycling Team	+ 4' 08"

=== Points classification ===
	Rider	Team	Points
1	Kirsten Wild (NED)	Team Argos–Shimano	102 points
2	Ellen van Dijk (NED)	Specialized–lululemon	63 points
3	Adrie Visser (NED)	Boels–Dolmans Cycling Team	44 points
4	Loes Gunnewijk (NED)	Orica–AIS	38 points
5	Jolien D'Hoore (BEL)	Lotto–Belisol Ladies	38 points

=== Sprints classification ===
	Rider	Team	Points
1	Anna van der Breggen (NED)	Sengers Ladies Cycling Team	18 points
2	Lauren Kitchen (AUS)	Wiggle–Honda	5 points
3	Christine Majerus (LUX)	Sengers Ladies Cycling Team	4 points
4	Amy Pieters (NED)	Team Argos–Shimano	3 points
5	Valentina Carretta (ITA)	MCipollini–Giordana	3 points

=== Best club rider classification ===
	Rider	Team	Points
1	Eva Lechner (ITA)	Bike4Air NWV Groningen	14h 42' 39"
2	Ilona Hoeksma (NED)	Parkhotel Valkenburg Cycling Team	+ 3' 58"
3	Judith Bloem (NED)	Restore Cycling Mix	+ 5' 17"
4	Bianca van den Hoek (NED)	Parkhotel Valkenburg Cycling Team	+ 7' 12"
5	Moniek Tenniglo (NED)	Rabo Plieger van Arckel	+ 8' 24"
6	Aafke Eshuis (NED)	Parkhotel Valkenburg Cycling Team	+ 9' 32"

=== Youth classification ===
	Rider	Team	Time
1	Jolanda Neff (SUI)	Rabobank-Liv Giant	11h 40' 14"
2	Annette Edmondson (AUS)	Orica–AIS	+ 16"
3	Laura Trott (GBR)	Wiggle–Honda	+ 4' 16"
4	Emilie Moberg (NOR)	Hitec Products UCK	+ 4' 36"
5	Amy Pieters (NED)	Team Argos–Shimano	+ 7' 13"

=== Team classification ===
	Team	Time
1	Orica–AIS	43h 32' 31"
2	Rabobank-Liv Giant	+ 2' 46"
3	Specialized–lululemon	+ 2' 59"
4	Boels–Dolmans Cycling Team	+ 2' 46"
5	Team Argos–Shimano	+ 2' 59"

== Classification leadership ==
Stage	Winner	General classification	Points classification	Sprints classification	Combativity classification	Young rider classification	Best club rider classification	Team classification
1	Kirsten Wild	Kirsten Wild	Kirsten Wild	Anna van der Breggen	Loes Gunnewijk	Laura Trott	Ilona Hoeksma	Specialized–lululemon
2	Kirsten Wild	Kirsten Wild	Kirsten Wild	Anna van der Breggen	Lizzie Armitstead	Jolanda Neff	Ilona Hoeksma	Specialized–lululemon
3a	Ellen van Dijk	Ellen van Dijk	Kirsten Wild	Anna van der Breggen	No award	Jolanda Neff	Eva Lechner	Specialized–lululemon
3b	Kirsten Wild	Ellen van Dijk	Kirsten Wild	Anna van der Breggen	Jermaine Post	Jolanda Neff	Eva Lechner	Specialized–lululemon
4	Kirsten Wild	Ellen van Dijk	Kirsten Wild	Anna van der Breggen	Evelyn Arys	Jolanda Neff	Eva Lechner	Specialized–lululemon
5	Valentina Carretta	Ellen van Dijk	Kirsten Wild	Anna van der Breggen	Ruth Winder	Jolanda Neff	Eva Lechner	Orica–AIS
Final Classification		Ellen van Dijk	Kirsten Wild	Anna van der Breggen		Jolanda Neff	Eva Lechner	Orica–AIS

== Junior's Energiewacht Tour classification leadership ==
Stage	Winner	General classification	Points classification	Sprints classification	Combativity classification	Young rider classification	Team classification
1	Amy Hill	Amy Hill	Amy Hill	Marjolein van 't Geloof	Floortje Mackaij	Amalie Dideriksen	Wales National Team
2	Demi de Jong	Amy Hill	Floortje Mackaij	Lotte Kopecky	Marie Sonnery Cottet	Jeanne Korevaar	Netherlands National Team
3	Floortje Mackaij	Amy Hill	Floortje Mackaij	Lotte Kopecky	Kelly van den Steen	Jeanne Korevaar	Netherlands National Team
Final Classification		Amy Hill	Floortje Mackaij	Lotte Kopecky		Jeanne Korevaar	Netherlands National Team
