= 2012 UCI Road World Championships – Women's team time trial =

Women's team time trial
2012 UCI Road World Championships

Race details
- Dates: 16 September 2012
- Stages: 1
- Distance: 34.2 km (21.25 mi)
- Winning time: 46' 31.60"

Medalists
| | Gold | (Germany) Team Specialized–lululemon |
| | Silver | (Australia) Orica–AIS |
| | Bronze | (Netherlands) AA Drink–leontien.nl |

The Women's team time trial of the 2012 UCI Road World Championships cycling event took place on 16 September 2012 in the province of Limburg, Netherlands.

It was the first such event for trade teams. The race was won by the German licensed squad Team Specialized–lululemon (Charlotte Becker, Ellen van Dijk, Amber Neben, Evelyn Stevens, Ina-Yoko Teutenberg, Trixi Worrack) by 24.19 seconds over the Australian Orica–AIS, with the Dutch outfit AA Drink–leontien.nl completing the podium, 1 minute and 59.32 seconds in arrears of Team Specialized–lululemon.

== Participation ==
Invitations were sent to the 20 leading UCI Women's Teams in the team rankings on 15 August 2012. Sengers Ladies Cycling Team, which entered the top 20 on 26 August was invited as well. Twelve teams accepted the invitation within the deadline and got the right to participate. Each team consisted of six riders.

| Participating teams | UCI rank^{1} |
|---|---|
| Stichting Rabo Women Cycling Team | 1 |
| Team Specialized–lululemon | 2 |
| Orica–AIS | 3 |
| AA Drink–leontien.nl Cycling Team | 4 |
| Hitec Products–Mistral Home | 5 |
| Be Pink | 6 |

| Participating teams | UCI rank^{1} |
|---|---|
| RusVelo | 9 |
| Lotto–Belisol Ladies | 11 |
| Skil–Argos | 14 |
| Dolmans–Boels cyclingteam | 16 |
| S.C. Michela Fanini ROX | 20 |
| Sengers Ladies Cycling Team | 21 |

1: UCI women's teams ranking as of 15 August 2012

== Parcours ==
The teams completed a course that was 34.2 km (21.3 mi) starting from Sittard and finishing in Valkenburg aan de Geul. There were two named climbs: the Lange Raarberg (1300m, 4.5%) and the famous Cauberg (1200m 5.8%) that features in the Amstel Gold Race. The finish was located 1.5 km after the top of the Cauberg.

== Pre-race favourite ==
Team Specialized–lululemon was the top favourite for the team time trial. The team won all the team time trials that season however the difference in time between the number two in each time trial, Orica–AIS, became each time trial smaller. In April in stage 4b of the Energiewacht Tour Specialized–lululemon won the team time trial over 26.5 km (16.5 mi) by 40 seconds over Orica–AIS. More close to the World Championships the difference between Specialized–lululemon and Orica–AIS was 29 seconds at the world cup race Open de Suède Vårgårda over 42.5 km (26.4 mi) (17 August 2012) and eleven days before the World Championships only 19 seconds in stage 2 at the 2012 BrainWash Ladies Tour over 34 km (21 mi). A difference between the time trials that year and the one at the World Championships was that the World Championships was on a hilly parcours and all the other ones were flat.

== Race ==
Team Specialized–lululemon were the last team down the start ramp and Ina-Yoko Teutenberg, the squad's weakest climber on paper, put in a shift on the front in the early, flat kilometres, ensuring that the team broke more or less even with Orica–AIS. At the first time check after 11 km, the Orica–AIS sextet was less than a second behind Specialized–lululemon. Specialized–lululemon began to come to the fore and the team set a ferocious tempo up the climb of the Lange Raarberg, a little under two-thirds of the way into the race. At the second time check Specialized–lululemon coming through 13 seconds clear of the rivals. With Orica–AIS reduced to the minimum four for the finale, they remained in contention on the final climb of the Cauberg hill and crossed the line after the false flat 1:35 quicker than AA Drink–leontien.nl squad. Specialized–lululemon's Evelyn Stevens hit the front up the Cauberg hill with 20 seconds in hand and once over the top, Amber Neben, Trixi Worrack, Charlotte Becker and local favourite Ellen van Dijk took over for the final push to the line and brought Specialized–lululemon home to claim the first women's world team time trial victory.

== Final classification ==
| Rank | Team | Cyclists | Time |
|---|---|---|---|
| 1st place, gold medalist(s) | (Germany) Team Specialized–lululemon | Charlotte Becker (GER); Ellen van Dijk (NED); Amber Neben (USA); Evelyn Stevens (USA); Ina-Yoko Teutenberg (GER); Trixi Worrack (GER) | 46' 31.63" |
| 2nd place, silver medalist(s) | (Australia) Orica–AIS | Judith Arndt (GER); Shara Gillow (AUS); Loes Gunnewijk (NED); Melissa Hoskins (AUS); Alex Rhodes (AUS); Linda Villumsen (NZL) | + 24.19" |
| 3rd place, bronze medalist(s) | (Netherlands) AA Drink–leontien.nl | Chantal Blaak (NED); Lucinda Brand (NED); Jessie Daams (BEL); Sharon Laws (GBR); Emma Pooley (GBR); Kirsten Wild (NED) | + 1' 59.32" |
| 4 | (Netherlands) Rabobank Women Cycling Team | Tatiana Antoshina (RUS); Thalita de Jong (NED); Pauline Ferrand-Prévot (FRA); Iris Slappendel (NED); Annemiek van Vleuten (NED); Marianne Vos (NED) | + 2' 20.40" |
| 5 | (Russia) RusVelo | Natalia Boyarskaya (RUS); Svetlana Bubnenkova (RUS); Romy Kasper (GER); Hanka Kupfernagel (GER); Irina Molicheva (RUS); Olga Zabelinskaya (RUS) | + 2' 30.58" |
| 6 | (Italy) Be Pink | Alena Amialiusik (BLR); Noemi Cantele (ITA); Simona Frapporti (ITA); Elke Gebhardt (GER); Yuliya Martisova (RUS); Silvia Valsecchi (ITA) | + 3' 14.80" |
| 7 | (Italy) S.C. Michela Fanini-Rox | Alexandra Burchenkova (RUS); Verónica Leal Balderas (MEX); Martina Růžičková (CZE); Azucena Sánchez Benito (ESP); Valentina Scandolara (ITA); Grete Treier (EST) | + 4' 37.26" |
| 8 | (Norway) Hitec Products–Mistral Home | Cecilie Gotaas Johnsen (NOR); Tone Hatteland Lima (NOR); Elisa Longo Borghini (ITA); Emilie Moberg (NOR); Lise Nøstvold (NOR); Thea Thorsen (NOR) | + 4' 38.00" |
| 9 | (Netherlands) Dolmans–Boels cyclingteam | Martine Bras (NED); Janneke Ensing (NED); Nina Kessler (NED); Pauliena Rooijakkers (NED); Winanda Spoor (NED); Emma Trott (GBR) | + 5' 00.17" |
| 10 | (Belgium) Lotto–Belisol Ladies | Robyn de Groot (RSA); Sofie De Vuyst (BEL); Ann-Sophie Duyck (BEL); Kaat Hannes (BEL); Ludivine Henrion (BEL); Kim Schoonbaert (BEL) | + 5' 31.99" |
| 11 | (Netherlands) Skil–Argos | Suzanne de Goede (NED); Kelly Markus (NED); Amy Pieters (NED); Esra Tromp (NED); Monique Van De Ree (NED); Adrie Visser (NED) | + 5' 33.31" |
| 12 | (Belgium) Sengers Ladies Cycling Team | Kimberly Buyl (BEL); Vera Koedooder (NED); Claudia Koster (NED); Birgit Lavrijssen (NED); Inge Roggeman (BEL); Geerike Schreurs (NED) | + 5' 42.91" |

Data from uci.ch.
