= Monique van de Ree =

Dutch cyclist

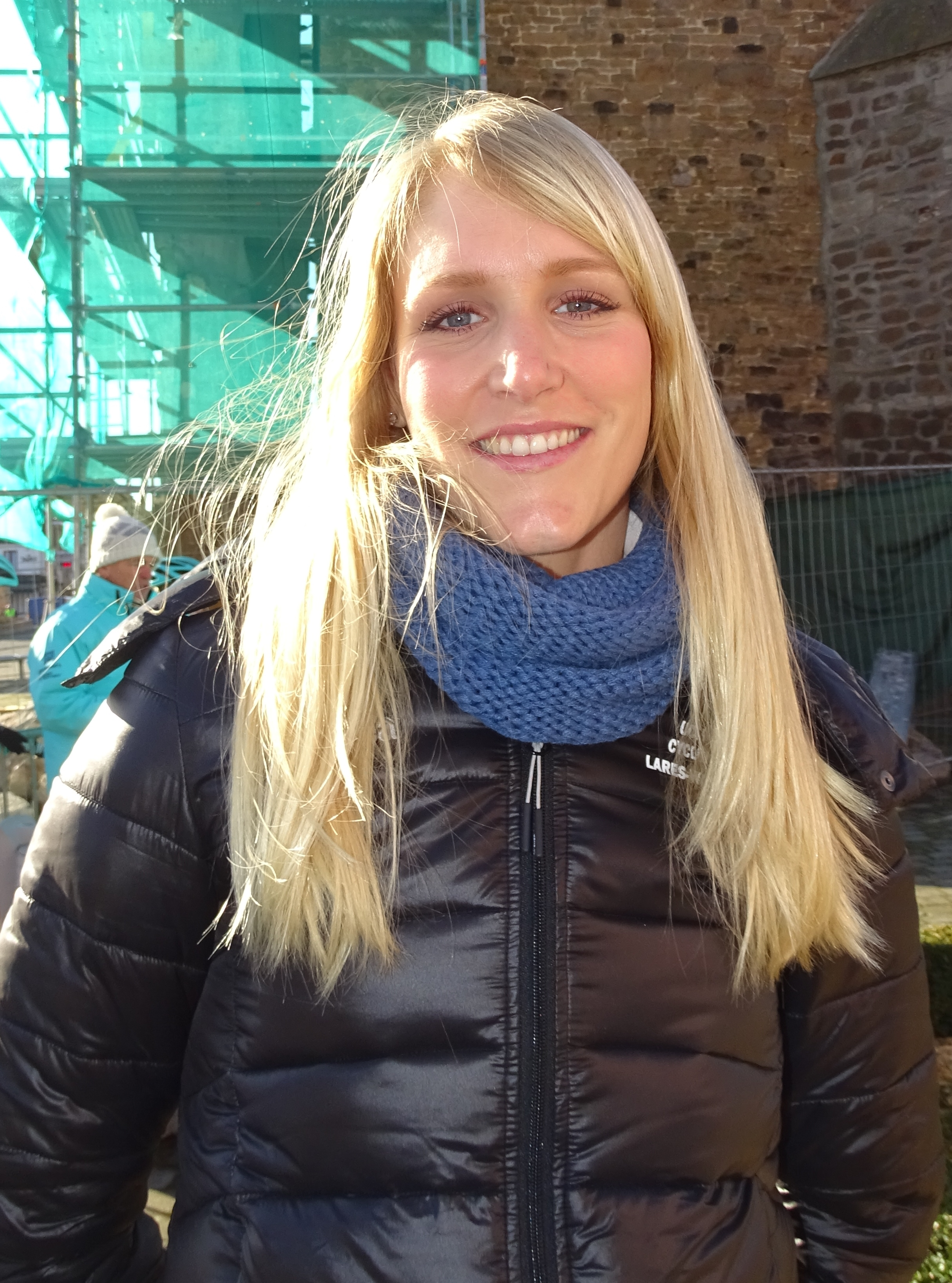
- Van de Ree in 2016.

Personal information
- Full name: Monique van de Ree
- Born: 2 March 1988 (age 38) Willemstad, North Brabant, Netherlands

Cycling career
- Sport: Cycling
- Current team: Retired
- Discipline: Road
- Role: Rider

Amateur team
- 2015: De Jonge Renner Ladies

Professional teams
- 2007: Vrienden van het Platteland
- 2009–2011: leontien.nl
- 2012: Skil 1t4i
- 2013: CyclelivePLUS–Zannata
- 2014: Parkhotel Valkenburg Continental Team
- 2016–2017: Lares–Waowdeals
- 2018: WaowDeals Pro Cycling
- 2019: BTC City Ljubljana

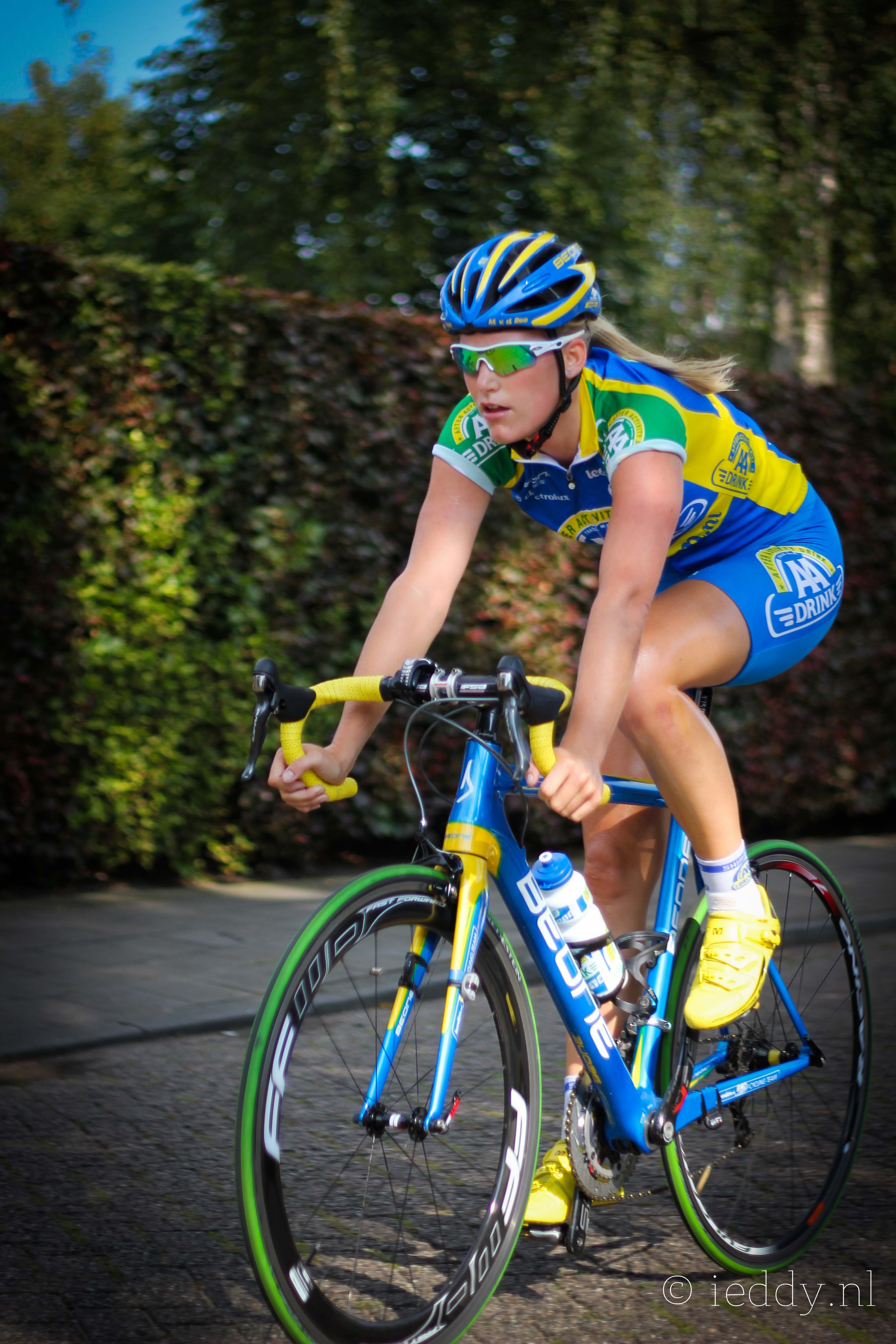
Monique van de Ree in 2011 riding for AA Drink-leontien.nl

Monique van de Ree (born 2 March 1988) is a Dutch former road cyclist, who rode professionally between 2007 and 2019 for eight different teams. She participated at the 2012 UCI Road World Championships in the Women's team time trial for Skil–Argos.

== Major results ==
2009
4th Omloop der Kempen
10th Omloop Het Nieuwsblad
10th Rund um die Nürnberger Altstadt
2010
6th Grand Prix de Dottignies
9th Overall Ladies Tour of Qatar
10th Drentse 8 van Dwingeloo
2011
10th Overall Energiewacht Tour
2013
4th Knokke-Heist – Bredene
9th Erondegemse Pijl
2015
1st Parel van de Veluwe
2nd Omloop van de IJsseldelta
5th Ronde van Overijssel
7th Trofee Maarten Wynants
10th EPZ Omloop van Borsele
10th Diamond Tour
2016
3rd Diamond Tour
4th Trofee Maarten Wynants
4th Erondegemse Pijl
6th Omloop van de IJsseldelta
7th Madrid Challenge by La Vuelta
9th 7-Dorpenomloop Aalburg
2017
2nd Diamond Tour
6th Erondegemse Pijl
7th Omloop van Borsele
7th Gooik–Geraardsbergen–Gooik
2018
2nd Trofee Maarten Wynants
3rd Erondegemse Pijl
4th 7-Dorpenomloop Aalburg
4th Omloop van de IJsseldelta
9th Brabantse Pijl Dames Gooik
10th Flanders Ladies Classic
2019
1st Erondegemse Pijl
6th Diamond Tour

== See also ==
- 2007 Vrienden van het Platteland season
- 2011 AA Drink–leontien.nl season
- 2014 Parkhotel Valkenburg Continental Team season
