= 2013 Trophée d'Or Féminin =

Race details
- Dates: 24–28 August 2013
- Stages: 6
- Distance: 496.3 km (308.4 mi)
- Winning time: 13h 11' 02"

Results
Jersey awarded to the overall winner	Winner	Marianne Vos (NED)	(Rabobank-Liv Giant)
	Second	Anna van der Breggen (NED)	(Sengers Ladies Cycling Team)
	Third	Lucinda Brand (NED)	(Rabobank-Liv Giant)

The 2013 Trophée d'Or Féminin was the 17th edition of a women's cycle stage race held in France. The tour was held from 24 August to 28 August. The tour has a UCI rating of 2.2.

== Stages ==
=== Stage 1 ===
24 August Saint-Amand-Montrond to Graçay 107.10 km (66.5 mi)

Stage 1 result

	Rider	Team	Time
1	Marianne Vos (NED)	Rabobank-Liv Giant	3h 08' 02"
2	Giorgia Bronzini (ITA)	Wiggle–Honda	s.t.
3	Lucinda Brand (NED)	Rabobank-Liv Giant	s.t.
4	Valentina Scandolara (ITA)	MCipollini–Giordana	+ 2"
5	Anna van der Breggen (NED)	Sengers Ladies Cycling Team	+ 5"

General classification after stage 1

	Rider	Team	Time
1	Marianne Vos (NED)	Rabobank-Liv Giant	3h 07' 52"
2	Giorgia Bronzini (ITA)	Wiggle–Honda	+ 4"
3	Lucinda Brand (NED)	Rabobank-Liv Giant	+ 6"
4	Valentina Scandolara (ITA)	MCipollini–Giordana	+ 12"
5	Anna van der Breggen (NED)	Sengers Ladies Cycling Team	+14"

=== Stage 2 ===
25 August Mehun-sur-Yèvre to Mehun sur Yèvre (ITT) 17.80 km (11.1 mi)

Stage 2 result

	Rider	Team	Time
1	Marianne Vos (NED)	Rabobank-Liv Giant	23'10
2	Tatiana Antoshina (RUS)	MCipollini–Giordana	+ 17"
3	Alexandra Burchenkova (NED)	RusVelo	+ 34"
4	Anna van der Breggen (NED)	Sengers Ladies Cycling Team	+ 38"
5	Iris Slappendel (ITA)	Rabobank-Liv Giant	+ 59"

General classification after stage 2

	Rider	Team	Time
1	Marianne Vos (NED)	Rabobank-Liv Giant	3h 31' 05"
2	Anna van der Breggen (NED)	Sengers Ladies Cycling Team	+ 52"
3	Lucinda Brand (NED)	Rabobank-Liv Giant	+ 1' 15"
4	Valentina Scandolara (ITA)	MCipollini–Giordana	+ 1' 34"
5	Iris Slappendel (NED)	Rabobank-Liv Giant	+ 2' 03"

=== Stage 3 ===
25 August La Chapelle-Saint-Ursin to La Chapelle St Ursin 78.30 km (48.7 mi)

Stage 3 result

	Rider	Team	Time
1	Anastasia Chulkova (RUS)	RusVelo	2h 02' 42"
2	Marianne Vos (NED)	Rabobank-Liv Giant	+ 1' 10"
3	Giorgia Bronzini (ITA)	Wiggle–Honda	+ 1' 10"
4	Marta Tagliaferro (ITA)	MCipollini–Giordana	+ 1' 10"
5	Pascale Jeuland (FRA)	Vienne Futuroscope	+ 1' 10"

General classification after stage 3

	Rider	Team	Time
1	Marianne Vos (NED)	Rabobank-Liv Giant	5h 34' 53"
2	Anna van der Breggen (NED)	Sengers Ladies Cycling Team	+ 56 "
3	Lucinda Brand (NED)	Rabobank-Liv Giant	+ 1' 19"
4	Valentina Scandolara (ITA)	MCipollini–Giordana	+ 1' 38"
5	Iris Slappendel (NED)	Rabobank-Liv Giant	+ 2' 07"

=== Stage 4 ===
26 August Cosne-Cours-sur-Loire to Cosne Cours Sur Loire 99.40 km (61.8 mi)

Stage 4 result

	Rider	Team	Time
1	Marianne Vos (NED)	Rabobank-Liv Giant	2h 42' 47"
2	Valentina Scandolara (ITA)	MCipollini–Giordana	s.t.
3	Anna van der Breggen (NED)	Sengers Ladies Cycling Team	s.t.
4	Lucinda Brand (NED)	Rabobank-Liv Giant	+ 2"
5	Tatiana Antoshina (RUS)	MCipollini–Giordana	+ 2"

General classification after stage 4

	Rider	Team	Time
1	Marianne Vos (NED)	Rabobank-Liv Giant	8h 17' 30"
2	Anna van der Breggen (NED)	Sengers Ladies Cycling Team	+ 1' 02 "
3	Lucinda Brand (NED)	Rabobank-Liv Giant	+ 1' 31"
4	Valentina Scandolara (ITA)	MCipollini–Giordana	+ 1' 39"
5	Tatiana Antoshina (RUS)	MCipollini–Giordana	+ 2' 53"

=== Stage 5 ===
26 August Baugy to Baugy 105.70 km (65.7 mi)

Stage 5 result

	Rider	Team	Time
1	Amy Cure (AUS)		2h 32' 22"
2	Megan Guarnier (ITA)	Rabobank-Liv Giant	s.t.
3	Anastasia Chulkova (RUS)	RusVelo	s.t.
4	Marta Tagliaferro (ITA)	MCipollini–Giordana	s.t.
5	Barbara Guarischi (RUS)	Vaiano Fondriest	+ 1"

General classification after stage 5

	Rider	Team	Time
1	Marianne Vos (NED)	Rabobank-Liv Giant	10h 50' 40"
2	Anna van der Breggen (NED)	Sengers Ladies Cycling Team	+ 1' 02 "
3	Lucinda Brand (NED)	Rabobank-Liv Giant	+ 1' 31"
4	Valentina Scandolara (ITA)	MCipollini–Giordana	+ 1' 39"
5	Tatiana Antoshina (RUS)	MCipollini–Giordana	+ 2' 53"

=== Stage 6 ===
26 August Orval to Saint-Amand-Montrond 88 km (54.7 mi)

Stage 6 result

	Rider	Team	Time
1	Annemiek van Vleuten (NED)	Rabobank-Liv Giant	2h 18' 56"
2	Marta Tagliaferro (ITA)	MCipollini–Giordana	+ 7"
3	Laura Trott (GBR)	Wiggle–Honda	+ 7"
4	Alexandra Burchenkova (RUS)	RusVelo	+ 7"
5	Christel Ferrier-Bruneau (FRA)	Faren–Let's Go Finland	+ 7"

General classification after stage 6

	Rider	Team	Time
1	Marianne Vos (NED)	Rabobank-Liv Giant	10h 50' 40"
2	Anna van der Breggen (NED)	Sengers Ladies Cycling Team	+ 1' 02 "
3	Lucinda Brand (NED)	Rabobank-Liv Giant	+ 1' 31"
4	Valentina Scandolara (ITA)	MCipollini–Giordana	+ 1' 39"
5	Tatiana Antoshina (RUS)	MCipollini–Giordana	+ 2' 53"

== Classification leadership ==
Stage	Winner	General classification	Young rider classification
1	Marianne Vos	Marianne Vos	Elena Cecchini
2	Marianne Vos	Marianne Vos	Amy Cure
3	Anastasia Chulkova	Marianne Vos	Amy Cure
4	Marianne Vos	Marianne Vos	Amy Cure
5	Amy Cure	Marianne Vos	Amy Cure
6	Annemiek van Vleuten	Marianne Vos	Amy Cure
Final		Marianne Vos	Amy Cure
