= 2013 Classica Citta di Padova =

Race details
- Dates: 16 March 2013
- Distance: 126 km (78.29 mi)

Results
	Winner	Giorgia Bronzini (ITA)	(Wiggle High5)
	Second	Trixi Worrack (GER)	(Velocio–SRAM Pro Cycling)
	Third	Marta Tagliaferro (ITA)	(MCipollini–Giordana)

The 2013 Classica Citta di Padova was the 5th edition of a one-day women's cycle race held in Padova, Italy on February 27 2013. The tour has an UCI rating of 1.1. The race was won by the Italian Giorgia Bronzini racing for Wiggle High5.

Result

	Rider	Team	Time
1	Giorgia Bronzini (ITA)	Wiggle High5	3h 01' 00"
2	Trixi Worrack (GER)	Velocio–SRAM Pro Cycling	s.t.
3	Marta Tagliaferro (ITA)	MCipollini–Giordana	s.t.
4	Giada Borgato (ITA)	Pasta Zara–Cogeas	s.t.
5	Barbara Guarischi (ITA)	Vaiano–Fondriest	s.t.
6	Christine Majerus (LUX)	Sengers Ladies Cycling Team	s.t.
7	Daniela Gass (GER)	Squadra Scappatella	s.t.
8	Aurore Verhoeven (FRA)	Team Futurumshop.nl	s.t.
9	Evelyn Arys (BEL)	Sengers Ladies Cycling Team	s.t.
10	Elena Cecchini (ITA)	Faren–Let's Go Finland	s.t.

== See also ==
- 2013 in women's road cycling
