= Iris Slappendel =

Dutch road racing cyclist

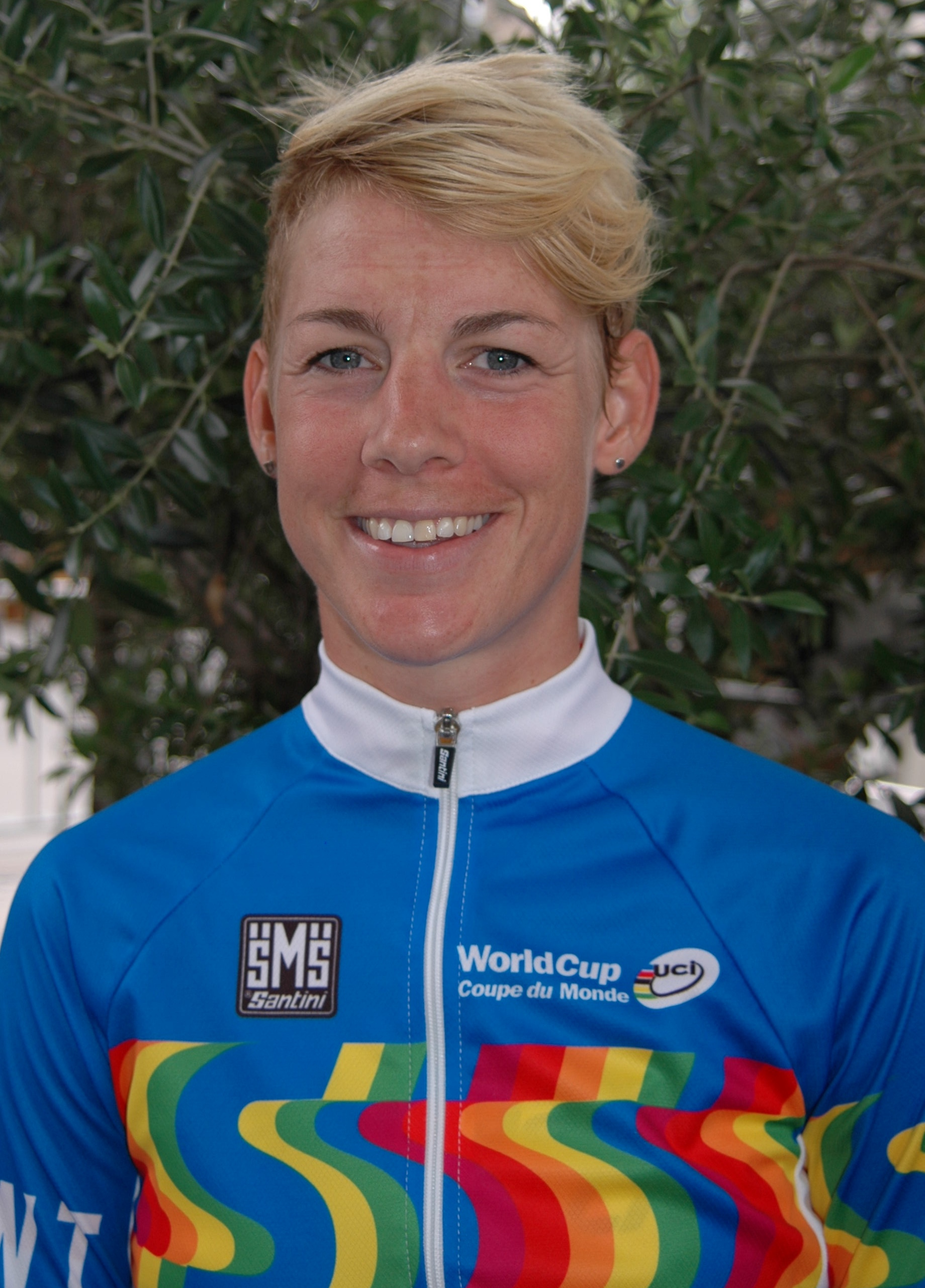
- Slappendel in 2014

Personal information
- Nickname: Slappy
- Born: 18 February 1985 (age 41) Gouda, South Holland, Netherlands
- Height: 1.73 m (5 ft 8 in)

Cycling career
- Sport: Cycling
- Current team: Retired
- Discipline: Road
- Role: Rider

Professional teams
- 2004–2006: Vrienden van het Platteland
- 2007–2009: Team Flexpoint
- 2010–2011: Cervélo TestTeam
- 2012–2014: Rabobank-Liv Woman Cycling Team
- 2015: Bigla Pro Cycling Team
- 2016: UnitedHealthcare

Major wins
- Open de Suède Vårgårda (2012); National Road Race Championships (2014)
Medal record
Women's road cycling
Representing the Netherlands
World University Cycling Championship
Gold medal – first place	2008 Nijmegen	Time trial

Iris Slappendel (born 18 February 1985) is a Dutch former road racing cyclist.

== Career ==
She won the 2012 Open de Suède Vårgårda road race, the penultimate event in the 2012 UCI Women's Road World Cup. Slappendel took a total of five UCI race victories in her career, including the GP Comune di Cornaredo and stages of the Thüringen Rundfahrt der Frauen, the Ster Zeeuwsche Eilanden and La Route de France.

In September 2014 Slappendel announced that she would join the Bigla Pro Cycling Team for the 2015 season. After one season she moved to UnitedHealthcare, racing mainly in North America. In September 2016 she announced her retirement from professional competition, having won her final race, the Gateway Cup, earlier that month.

== Personal life ==
Outside of cycling, she works freelance as a designer, and she won a competition to design new jerseys for the leaders of the season-long classifications of the UCI Women's Road World Cup, to be used from the 2014 season. Since retiring, Slappendel has continued her career as a designer and started her own business that designs and manufactures cycling apparel. Having previously represented female riders in the UCI Athlete's Commission from 2015 to 2017, Slappendel now dedicates her time to The Cyclists' Alliance as executive director.

== Major results ==
2006
3rd Overall Ster Zeeuwsche Eilanden
2007
8th Road race, National Road Championships
2008
5th Time trial, National Road Championships
9th Overall Ster Zeeuwsche Eilanden
10th Peperbus Profspektakel
2009
2nd Omloop Van De Blauwe Stad
3rd Open de Suède Vårgårda TTT
3rd Grand Prix Elsy Jacobs
4th Chrono Champenois - Trophée Européen
8th Time trial, National Road Championships
9th Overall Holland Ladies Tour
9th Omloop van Borsele
2010
1st Open de Suède Vårgårda TTT
2nd Overall Ster Zeeuwsche Eilanden
3rd Parkhotel Rooding Hills Classic
5th Time trial, National Road Championships
6th Omloop Door Middag-humsterland
8th Overall Thüringen Rundfahrt der Frauen

1st Stage 6

10th Omloop Het Nieuwsblad
10th Ronde van Drenthe
2011
3rd Overall Ladies Tour of Qatar
3rd Open de Suède Vårgårda TTT
4th Time trial, National Road Championships
5th Erondegemse Pijl
6th Overall Ster Zeeuwsche Eilanden
7th Overall Trophée d'Or Féminin
7th Open de Suède Vårgårda
8th 7-Dorpenomloop Aalburg
9th Omloop van Borsele
2012
1st GP Comune di Cornaredo
1st Open de Suède Vårgårda
National Road Championships

3rd Time trial
10th Road race

3rd Open de Suède Vårgårda TTT
4th Team time trial, UCI Road World Championships
4th Overall Ster Zeeuwsche Eilanden

1st Prologue

6th Overall Energiewacht Tour
6th Erondegemse Pijl
6th 7-Dorpenomloop Aalburg
2013
2nd Grand Prix de Dottignies
3rd Gooik–Geraardsbergen–Gooik
8th Time trial, National Road Championships
8th Overall Trophée d'Or Féminin
8th Overall Energiewacht Tour
2014
1st Overall Sprints classification UCI Women's Road World Cup
1st Road race, National Road Championships
1st Stage 7 La Route de France
8th Ronde van Overijssel
10th Overall Ladies Tour of Qatar
10th Ronde van Drenthe World Cup
2015
8th Gent–Wevelgem
2016
1st Gateway Cup
