= Christine Majerus =

Luxembourgish racing cyclist

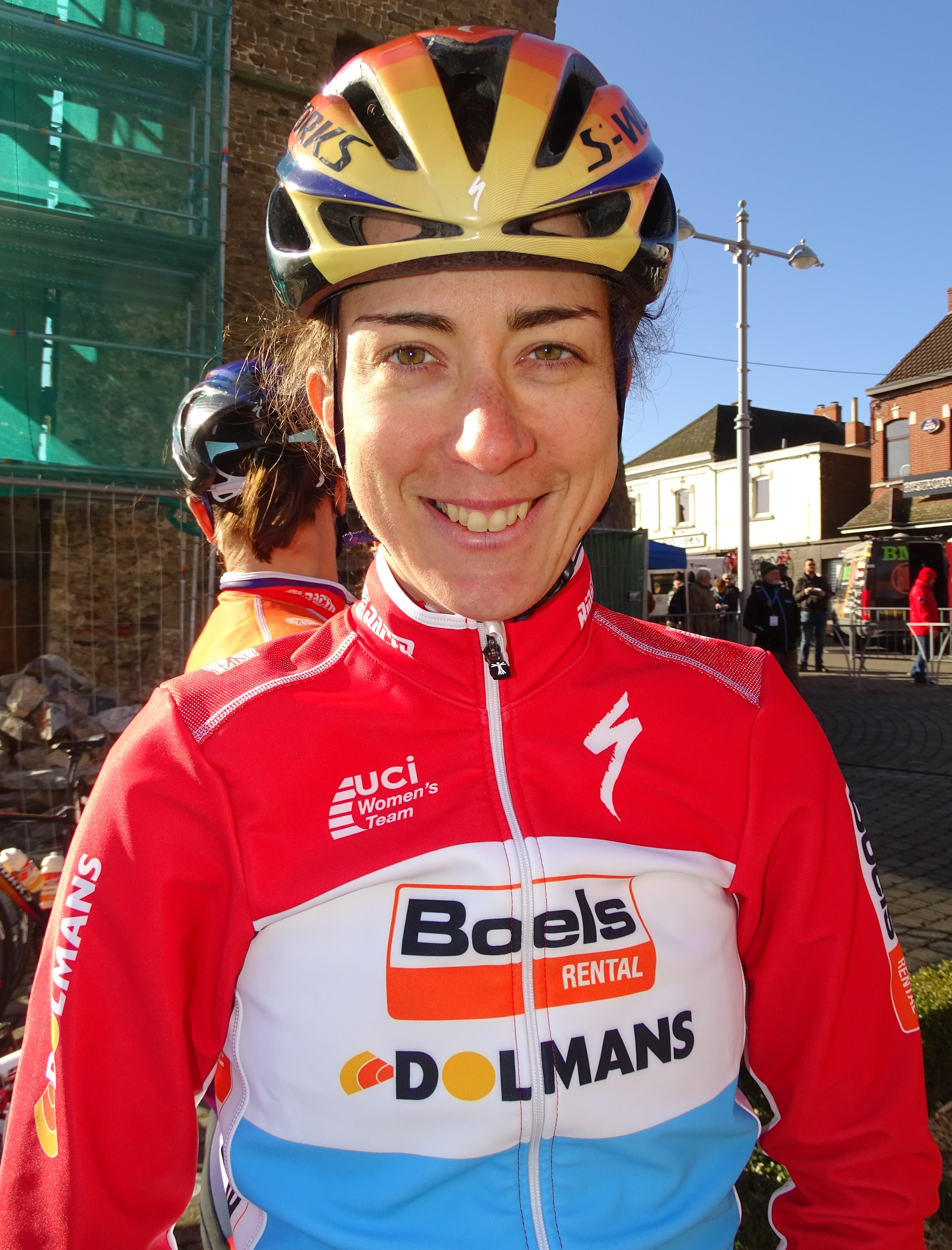
- Majerus at the start of the 2016 Le Samyn des Dames

Personal information
- Full name: Christine Majerus
- Born: 25 February 1987 (age 39) Luxembourg City, Luxembourg
- Height: 1.73 m (5 ft 8 in)

Cycling career
- Sport: Cycling
- Current team: Retired
- Disciplines: Road; Track; Cyclo-cross
- Role: Rider

Professional teams
- 2008–2012: ESGL 93-GSD Gestion
- 2013: Sengers Ladies Cycling Team
- 2014–2024: Boels–Dolmans

Major wins
- One-day races National Road Race Championships (2010–2023) National Time Trial Championships (2007–2024) National Cyclo-cross Championships (2010–2020, 2022) Sparkassen Giro Bochum (2013) La Classique Morbihan (2016) Drentse Acht van Westerveld (2022) Stage races Holland Ladies Tour (2019)
Medal record
Representing Luxembourg
Games of the Small States of Europe
Gold medal – first place	Liechtenstein 2011	Road Race
Gold medal – first place	Luxembourg 2013	Road Race
Gold medal – first place	Luxembourg 2013	Time Trial
Gold medal – first place	Luxembourg 2013	Mountain Bike

Christine Majerus (born 25 February 1987) is a Luxembourgish former professional road and cyclo-cross cyclist, who rode for UCI Women's WorldTeam Team SD Worx–Protime and its predecessors from 2014 until her retirement in 2024. She won the 2013 Sparkassen Giro Bochum one-day road race and the general classification of the 2019 Holland Ladies Tour.

Majerus is one of the most dominant cyclists to come out of Luxembourg and is a 41-time national champion, holding 16 time trial titles, 12 cyclo-cross titles and 13 road race titles. She was named Luxembourgish Sportswoman of the Year in 2013 and in every ceremony from 2015 to 2021.

== Career ==
Majerus began her sporting career in athletics and was the Luxembourg champion at the 400 and 800 metres several times before switching to cycling following a foot injury. She raced for the small UCI Women's team ESGL 93-GSD Gestion from 2008 to 2012, before transferring to Sengers Ladies Cycling Team for one year in 2013.

She joined Boels–Dolmans in 2014 and remained with the team, now known as Team SD Worx–Protime, until her retirement in 2024. She often acted as road captain and has frequently been referred to as a super-domestique, but has also placed as high as ninth on the UCI Women's Road World Rankings (in 2019).

Majerus is also a member of the Elite Sports Section of the Luxembourg Army. She completed her basic training in 2012 and was not required to perform active service during her subsequent professional cycling career.

=== Olympics ===
Majerus competed at the 2012 Summer Olympics in the Women's road race, finishing 21st. She also took part in the 2016 and 2020 Games, and carried the flag for Luxembourg at the opening ceremony of the 2020 Olympics in Tokyo.

== Major results ==
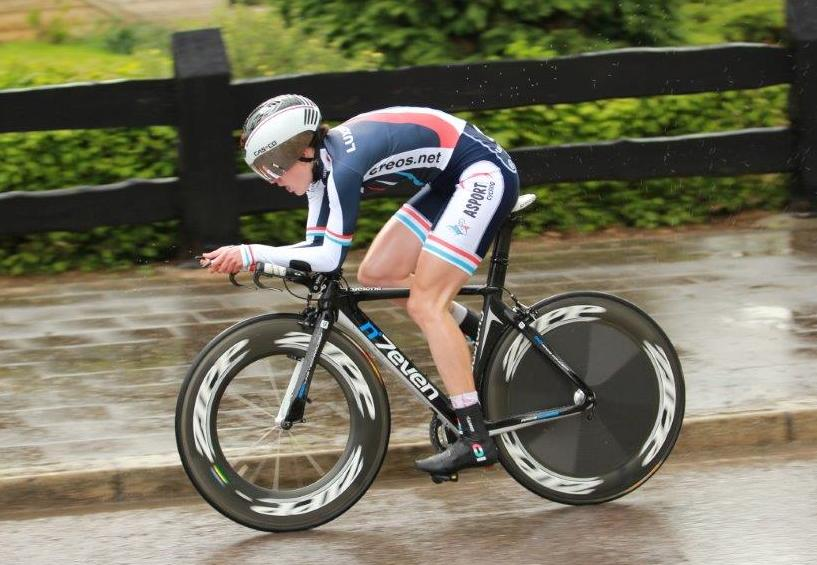
Majerus competing in the time trial at the 2013 Games of the Small States of Europe, at which she won all three women's cycling events

=== Cyclo-cross ===
2006–2007
3rd National Championships
2007–2008
3rd National Championships
2008–2009
2nd National Championships
2009–2010
1st National Championships
2010–2011
1st National Championships
2011–2012
1st National Championships
2012–2013
1st National Championships
2013–2014
1st National Championships
2014–2015
1st National Championships
National Trophy Series

2nd Milton Keynes

2015–2016
1st National Championships
2nd Otegem
2nd Pétange
3rd Bensheim
2016–2017
1st National Championships
EKZ CrossTour

1st Meilen
2nd Baden

1st Otegem
1st Pétange
1st Leudelange
2nd Zonnebeke
Superprestige

3rd Gavere
3rd Spa-Francorchamps

2017–2018
1st National Championships
Coupe de France

1st Jablines
1st Flamanville

1st Pétange
EKZ CrossTour

2nd Meilen

2nd Otegem
2nd Contern
3rd Rucphen
2018–2019
1st National Championships
1st Pétange
1st La Meziere
EKZ CrossTour

2nd Meilen
2nd Eschenbach
3rd Hittnau

3rd Zonnebeke
2019–2020
1st National Championships
EKZ CrossTour

1st Hittnau
1st Meilen

1st Zonnebeke
2nd Troyes
2020–2021
EKZ CrossTour

1st Hittnau

2021–2022
1st National Championships
1st Pétange
2023–2024
1st Pétange
2nd National Championships

=== Mountain Bike ===
1st Cross-country, Games of the Small States of Europe

=== Road ===
2007
National Championships

1st Time trial
3rd Road race

2008
National Championships

1st Time trial
2nd Road race

1st GP de la Ville de L'Hôpital
4th Grand Prix Elsy Jacobs
4th Trophée des Grimpeurs
2009
National Championships

1st Time trial
2nd Road race

2nd Wielertrofee Vlaanderen
3rd Cholet Pays de Loire
10th Chrono des Nations
2010
National Championships

1st Time trial
1st Road race

2nd Cholet Pays de Loire
2nd Beine-Nauroy
3rd Ladies Berry Classics Cher
5th GP Stad Roeselare
2011
1st Road race, Games of the Small States of Europe
National Championships

1st Time trial
1st Road race

1st Retonfrey Critérium
1st Thermse Kasseienomloop
2nd Sparkassen Giro
2nd Erondegemse Pijl
5th Cholet Pays de Loire
7th Gooik–Geraardsbergen–Gooik
8th Halle-Buizingen
9th Grand Prix de Dottignies
9th GP Stad Roeselare
2012
National Championships

1st Time trial
1st Road race

2nd Overall Nogent l'Abbesse et Beine-Nauroy

1st Stage 1

4th Grand Prix de Dottignies
5th Overall Tour de Bretagne
5th Cholet Pays de Loire
7th Halle-Buizingen
8th Le Samyn
8th Tour of Flanders
2013
Games of the Small States of Europe

1st Road race
1st Time trial

National Championships

1st Time trial
1st Road race

1st Sparkassen Giro Bochum
1st Mountains classification, Thüringen Rundfahrt
3rd Erondegemse Pijl
6th Classica Citta di Padova
8th Omloop van het Hageland
9th Overall Grand Prix Elsy Jacobs
9th Gooik–Geraardsbergen–Gooik
2014
National Championships

1st Time trial
1st Road race

3rd Open de Suède Vårgårda TTT
4th Overall Thüringen Rundfahrt
6th Sparkassen Giro
9th Gooik–Geraardsbergen–Gooik
10th Omloop Het Nieuwsblad
2015
National Championships

1st Time trial
1st Road race

2nd Team time trial, UCI World Championships
2nd Overall Tour de Bretagne

1st Points classification

3rd Overall Energiewacht Tour
3rd Overall The Women's Tour

1st Stage 3

3rd Novilon EDR Cup
3rd Grand Prix cycliste de Gatineau
3rd Crescent Women World Cup Vårgårda TTT
4th Diamond Tour
6th Overall Festival Luxembourgeois du Elsy Jacobs
6th Overall Tour of Norway
6th Sparkassen Giro
8th Omloop Het Nieuwsblad
8th Dwars door de Westhoek
10th La Course by Le Tour de France
2016
1st Team time trial, UCI World Championships
National Championships

1st Time trial
1st Road race

1st Dwars door de Westhoek
1st La Classique Morbihan
1st Stage 1 (TTT) Energiewacht Tour
1st Stage 1 The Women's Tour
1st Stage 2 (TTT) Holland Ladies Tour
2nd Drentse Acht van Westerveld
2nd Grand Prix de Plumelec-Morbihan
2nd Diamond Tour
3rd Omloop van Borsele
7th Overall Festival Luxembourgeois du Elsy Jacobs
7th Le Samyn
9th Giro dell'Emilia
2017
National Championships

1st Time trial
1st Road race

1st Overall Grand Prix Elsy Jacobs

1st Points classification
1st Stage 1

1st Crescent Vårgårda Team Time Trial
UCI World Championships

2nd Team time trial
6th Road race

2nd Overall The Women's Tour

1st Points classification
1st Sprints classification

4th Crescent Vårgårda Road Race
5th Overall Healthy Ageing Tour

1st Stage 2 (TTT)

7th Overall Tour of Norway
2018
National Championships

1st Time trial
1st Road race

Crescent Vårgårda

1st Team time trial
6th Road race

2nd Team time trial, UCI World Championships
2nd Overall Festival Elsy Jacobs

1st Stage 1

3rd Overall Healthy Ageing Tour

1st Stage 1b (TTT)

3rd Three Days of Bruges–De Panne
4th Overall The Women's Tour
4th Overall Tour of Norway
2019
National Championships

1st Time trial
1st Road race

1st Overall Holland Ladies Tour
1st La Classique Morbihan
1st Grand Prix International d'Isbergues
4th Overall Tour de Yorkshire

1st Points classification

4th Overall The Women's Tour
4th Overall Madrid Challenge by la Vuelta
7th RideLondon Classique
8th Overall Healthy Ageing Tour
8th Overall Tour of Norway
9th Road race, UEC European Championships
9th Overall Grand Prix Elsy Jacobs
9th Overall BeNe Ladies Tour
2020
National Championships

1st Time trial
1st Road race

2nd Le Samyn
5th Clasica Femenina Navarra
2021
National Championships

1st Time trial
1st Road race

2nd Dwars door het Hageland
8th Overall Festival Elsy Jacobs
8th Overall Thüringen Ladies Tour
9th Drentse Acht van Westerveld
10th Nokere Koerse
2022
National Championships

1st Time trial
1st Road race

1st Drentse Acht van Westerveld
2nd Postnord Vårgårda WestSweden TTT
2023
National Championships

1st Time trial
1st Road race

2nd À travers les Hauts-de-France
10th La Choralis Fourmies Féminine
2024
National Championships

1st Time trial
2nd Road race

2nd Festival Elsy Jacobs Garnich
3rd Overall Tour of Britain
7th Overall Baloise Ladies Tour
9th Ronde van Drenthe
9th Omloop van het Hageland

Summer Olympics
Preceded by Gilles Müller	Flag bearer for Luxembourg; Tokyo 2020; With: Raphaël Stacchiotti	Succeeded by Incumbent
