= 2013 Gooik–Geraardsbergen–Gooik =

Race details
- Dates: 27 May 2013
- Stages: 1

Results
	Winner	Emma Johansson (SWE)	(Orica–AIS)
	Second	Maaike Polspoel (BEL)	(Sengers Ladies Cycling Team)
	Third	Iris Slappendel (NED)	(Rabobank-Liv Giant)

The 2013 Gooik–Geraardsbergen–Gooik was a one-day women's cycle race held in Belgium on May 26 2013. The tour has an UCI rating of 1.2. The race was won by Emma Johansson of Orica–AIS.

Result

	Rider	Team	Time
1	Emma Johansson (SWE)	Orica–AIS	3h 30' 11"
2	Maaike Polspoel (BEL)	Sengers Ladies Cycling Team	s.t.
3	Iris Slappendel (NED)	Rabobank-Liv Giant	s.t.
4	Tiffany Cromwell (AUS)	Orica–AIS	+ 48"
5	Marianne Vos (NED)	Rabobank-Liv Giant	+ 48"
6	Jessie Daams (BEL)	Boels–Dolmans Cycling Team	+ 48"
7	Katarzyna Pawłowska (POL)	GSD Gestion — Kallisto	+ 48"
8	Rossella Ratto (ITA)	Hitec Products UCK	+ 48"
9	Christine Majerus (LUX)	Sengers Ladies Cycling Team	+ 5' 50"
10	Adrie Visser (NED)	Boels–Dolmans Cycling Team	+ 5' 50"
