= Valentina Scandolara =

Italian road bicycle racer

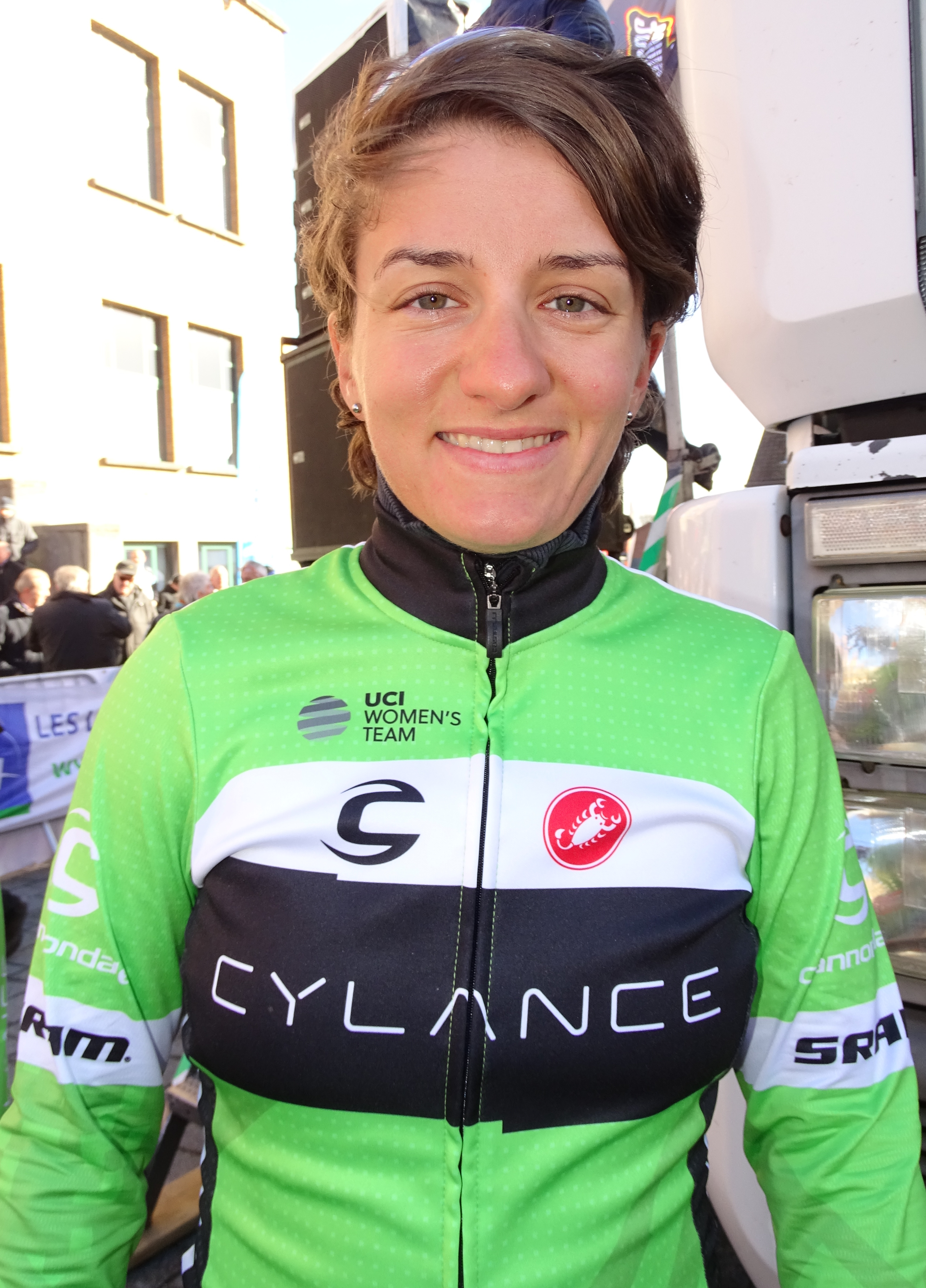
- Scandolara in 2016.

Personal information
- Full name: Valentina Scandolara
- Nicknames: Vale; Brumby; Lil Italian
- Born: 1 May 1990 (age 36) Soave, Italy

Cycling career
- Sport: Cycling
- Current team: Aromitalia Vaiano
- Discipline: Road
- Role: Rider; Directeur sportif
- Rider type: All rounder

Amateur teams
- 2003–2008: Officine Alberti UC Val D'Illasi
- 2015–2016: Roxsolt (guest)
- 2017: Alé Cycling (guest)
- 2018: Maaslandster International (guest)
- 2018–2019: Roxsolt (guest)

Professional teams
- 2009: Safi–Pasta Zara–Titanedi
- 2010: Vaiano Solaristech
- 2011: Gauss
- 2012: S.C. Michela Fanini Rox
- 2013: MCipollini–Giordana
- 2014–2015: Orica–AIS
- 2016: Cylance Pro Cycling
- 2017: WM3 Energie
- 2019: Cogeas–Mettler–Look
- 2021–: Aromitalia–Basso Bikes–Vaiano

Managerial teams
- 2019: Sydney Uni–Staminade
- 2020: Cogeas–Mettler–Look

Valentina Scandolara (born 1 May 1990) is an Italian road bicycle racer, who currently rides for UCI Women's Continental Team Aromitalia Vaiano.

== Career ==
Scandolara was born in Soave. She showed great talent in sports from a very early age, winning three National Champion titles in Cross Country running and one in Futsal, before committing full-time to Cycling.

During the early stages of her professional career, she raced for Italian teams and was active on the Track and in Cyclocross, before being signed in 2014 from UCI number 1 ranked Orica–AIS and fully commit to Road Cycling.

In November 2015 she was announced as part of the inaugural squad for the Cylance Pro Cycling team for the 2016 season.

In September 2016 she was announced as part of the WM3 Energie squad for 2017.

She took a break from professional racing at the start of 2018 due to physical health problems, but she would return to racing at the end of February with the Maaslandster International Women's Cycling Team at the Setmana Ciclista Valenciana, before signing with Australian amateur team Roxsolt to start a summer season of racing in the US at the end of April. In between the 2017 and 2018 racing seasons, Scandolara completed the UCI Sport Directors Diploma and the UCI Coaching Diploma.

After winning the overall classification in the Lexus of Blackburn Bay Classic Series in January 2019, she directed Sarah Gigante to a double title in the Australian National Road Race Championships and the Australian National Time Trial Championships in Ballarat (Victoria). She also worked as Sport Director for the Sydney University–Staminade Cycling Team during UCI competitions "Race Melbourne", "Cadel Evans Road Race" and "Herald Sun Tour" in January 2019.

In December 2020, Scandolara signed a contract to ride for the Aromitalia–Basso Bikes–Vaiano team, for the 2021 season.

== Personal life ==
In February 2019 she graduated in Psychology at the University of Padua, with a thesis on women's cycling titled "Mind over matter: Emotional Intelligence as an Important Predictor of Success in Professional Women's Cycling".

== Major results ==
=== Cycling ===
2004
1st Road race, National Novices Road Championships
1st Sprint, National Novices Track Championships
2005
1st Road race, National Novices Road Championships
1st Sprint, National Novices Track Championships
2006
National Novices Road Championships

1st Road race
2nd Time trial

National Novices Track Championships

1st Points race
1st Individual pursuit
1st Sprint

1st Novice race, National Cyclo-cross Championships
2007
1st Road race, UEC European Junior Road Championships
3rd Road race, UCI Juniors World Championships
2008
1st Road race, UEC European Junior Road Championships
1st Road race, National Junior Road Championships
National Junior Track Championships

1st Team pursuit
2nd 500m time trial

2nd Points race, UCI Junior Track World Championships
UEC European Junior Track Championships

2nd Scratch
3rd Team pursuit

2009
Track European Cup, Barcelona

1st Points race
1st Scratch

2010
1st GP Union Vélocipédique Genevoise Lancy
2nd Classica Citta di Padova
3rd Prix des Vins Henri Valloton
6th GP Comune di Cornaredo
2011
1st Points race, UEC Under-23 European Track Championships
1st Giornata del Ciclismo Rosa a Nove
2nd Trofeo Vannucci Alberto
2nd GP Comune di Cornaredo
3rd National Cyclo-cross Championships
3rd Team sprint, National Track Championships
5th Road race, UEC European Under-23 Road Championships
5th Road race, National Road Championships
7th GP Liberazione
2012
National Cyclo-cross Championships

1st Under-23 race
3rd Elite race

6th Grand Prix de Dottignies
2013
1st Draai van de Kaai
1st Trofeo Vannucci Alberto
1st Stage 6 Thüringen Rundfahrt der Frauen
2nd Women's Bike Race Montignoso
3rd National Cyclo-cross Championships
3rd Ridderronde Maastricht
4th Overall Trophée d'Or Féminin
4th Overall Giro della Toscana Int. Femminile – Memorial Michela Fanini
10th Overall Grand Prix Elsy Jacobs

1st Mountains classification

2014
1st Giro del Trentino Alto Adige-Südtirol
1st Draai van de Kaai
2nd Team time trial, UCI Road World Championships
National Road Championships

2nd Road race
5th Time trial

2nd Overall Santos Tour Down Under
7th Overall Ladies Tour of Norway
2015
1st Overall Santos Tour Down Under

1st Stage 1

1st Melbourne Supercrit
1st Stage 4 Tour Cycliste Féminin International de l'Ardèche
2nd Overall Giro della Toscana Int. Femminile – Memorial Michela Fanini

1st Points classification

2nd Cadel Evans Great Ocean Road Race
2nd Acht van Westerveld
2nd SwissEver GP Cham-Hagendorn
2nd Draai van de Kaai
4th Overall Ladies Tour of Norway
6th Road race, European Games
10th Giro dell'Emilia Internazionale Donne Elite
2016
1st Draai van de Kaai
1st Melbourne Supercrit
1st Stage 3 Bay Classic Series
2nd Winston-Salem Cycling Classic
2017
1st Overall Bay Classic Series

1st Stage 1

1st Dwars door de Westhoek
2018
1st Overall Intelligentsia Cup

1st Races 2, 3, 5, 6, 7 & 10

1st USA Pro Road Tour Saint Francis Tulsa Tough – Race 3
USA CRITS Natural State Criterium Series

1st Races 1 & 3

Wilmington Grand Prix

1st Road race
1st Monkey Hill time trial

2019
1st Overall Bay Classic Series

=== Other sports ===
==== Cross Country Running ====
2000
2nd CSI National Cross Country Running Championships, Rocca di Papa
2001
1st CSI National Cross Country Running Championships, Rocca di Papa
2002
1st CSI National Cross Country Running Championships, Fiuggi
2003
1st CSI National Cross Country Running Championships, Paestum

==== Futsal ====
2006
1st Italian National Futsal/soccer Championships (High school Team: Liceo Scientifico Messedaglia, Verona)
