= 2013 Knokke-Heist – Bredene =

2013 Knokke-Heist — Bredene
Race details
- Dates: 4 May 2013
- Distance: 112.6 km (70.0 mi)

Results
	Winner	Giorgia Bronzini (ITA)	(Wiggle–Honda)
	Second	Jolien D'Hoore (BEL)	(Lotto–Belisol Ladies)
	Third	Martina Zwick (GER)	

The 2013 Knokke-Heist — Bredene was a one-day women's cycle race held from the Knokke-Heist municipality to municipality of Bredene both of which are located in the provincial region of West Flanders, Belgium on May 4 2013. The race has an UCI rating of 1.2. The race was won by the Italian Giorgia Bronzini of Wiggle High5.

Result

	Rider	Team	Time
1	Giorgia Bronzini (ITA)	Wiggle–Honda	3h 04' 21"
2	Jolien D'Hoore (BEL)	Lotto–Belisol Ladies	s.t.
3	Martina Zwick (GER)		s.t.
4	Monique van de Ree (NED)	CyclelivePLUS-Zannata Ladies Team	s.t.
5	Liesbet De Vocht (BEL)	Rabobank-Liv Giant	s.t.
6	Kelly Druyts (BEL)	Topsport Vlaanderen — Bioracer	s.t.
7	Lucy Martin (GBR)	Boels–Dolmans Cycling Team	s.t.
8	Martine Bras (NED)	Boels–Dolmans Cycling Team	s.t.
9	Sofie De Vuyst (BEL)	Sengers Ladies Cycling Team	s.t.
10	Kaat Van der Meulen (BEL)		s.t.
