= 2014 Grand Prix de Dottignies =

Race details
- Dates: 7 April 2014
- Stages: 1
- Distance: 131.26 km (81.56 mi)
- Winning time: 3h 25' 12"

Results
	Winner	Giorgia Bronzini (ITA)	(Wiggle–Honda)
	Second	Shelley Olds (USA)	(Alé–Cipollini)
	Third	Lucy Garner (GBR)	(Team Giant–Shimano)

The 2014 Grand Prix de Dottignies was the 13th edition of a one-day women's cycle race held in Dottignies, Belgium on 7 April 2014. The tour has an UCI rating of 1.2.

== Results ==
	Rider	Team	Time
1	Giorgia Bronzini (ITA)	Wiggle–Honda	3h 25' 12"
2	Shelley Olds (USA)	Alé–Cipollini	s.t.
3	Lucy Garner (GBR)	Team Giant–Shimano	s.t.
4	Elena Cecchini (ITA)	Estado de México–Faren Kuota	s.t.
5	Roxane Fournier (FRA)	Vienne Futuroscope	s.t.
6	Aude Biannic (FRA)	Lointek	s.t.
7	Maaike Polspoel (BEL)	Team Giant–Shimano	s.t.
8	Nina Kessler (NED)	Boels–Dolmans	s.t.
9	Mia Radotić (CRO)	BTC City Ljubljana	s.t.
10	Annalisa Cucinotta (ITA)	Servetto Footon	s.t.
