= 2014 Internationale Thüringen Rundfahrt der Frauen =

2014 Thüringen Rundfahrt der Frauen
Race details
- Dates: 14–20 July 2014
- Stages: Prologue + 6 stages
- Distance: 595.2 km (369.8 mi)

The 2014 Thüringen Rundfahrt der Frauen was the 27th edition of the Thüringen Rundfahrt der Frauen, a women's cycling stage race in Germany. It was rated by the Union Cycliste Internationale (UCI) as a category 2.1 race and was held between 14 and 20 July 2014.

== Teams competing ==
=== UCI Women's Teams === Velocio–SRAM Pro Cycling Team SD Worx–Protime Bigla Cycling Team Futurumshop.nl–Zannata Parkhotel Valkenburg Continental Team Firefighters Upsala CK	=== Elite professional teams === TKK Pacific Torun Team Koga Ladies Team Stevens–Hyerta Team Maxx Solar Cycling	=== National teams === Australia Germany Poland

== Stages ==
=== Prologue ===
14 July 2014 – Gotha to Gotha, 3.0 km (1.9 mi)

Prologue Result & General classification

	Rider	Team	Time
1	Lisa Brennauer (GER)	Velocio–SRAM Pro Cycling	5' 58"
2	Christine Majerus (LUX)	Team SD Worx–Protime	+ 9"
3	Trixi Worrack (GER)	Velocio–SRAM Pro Cycling	+ 9"
4	Stephanie Pohl (GER)	Germany (National team)	+ 9"
5	Sarah Roy (AUS)	Australia (National team)	+ 10"
6	Lizzie Williams (AUS)	Australia (National team)	+ 16"
7	Romy Kasper (GER)	Team SD Worx–Protime	+ 18"
8	Lizzie Armitstead (GBR)	Team SD Worx–Protime	+ 18"
9	Elke Gebhardt (GER)	Bigla Cycling Team	+ 20"
10	Hanka Kupfernagel (GER)	Team Maxx Solar Cycling	+ 21"

=== Stage 1 ===
15 July 2014 – Erfurt to Erfurt, 106.6 km (66.2 mi)

Stage 1 result

	Rider	Team	Time
1	Lizzie Armitstead (GBR)	Team SD Worx–Protime	2h 47' 25"
2	Lisa Brennauer (GER)	Velocio–SRAM Pro Cycling	s.t.
3	Evelyn Stevens (USA)	Velocio–SRAM Pro Cycling	+ 1"
4	Christine Majerus (LUX)	Team SD Worx–Protime	+ 47"
5	Sarah Roy (AUS)	Australia (National team)	+ 47"
6	Riejanne Markus (NED)	Parkhotel Valkenburg	+ 47"
7	Élise Delzenne (FRA)	Velocio–SRAM Pro Cycling	+ 47"
8	Katarzyna Wilkos (POL)	TKK Pacific Torun	+ 47"
9	Annelies Van Doorslaer (BEL)	Futurumshop.nl–Zannata	+ 47"
10	Beate Zanner (GER)	Team Maxx Solar Cycling	+ 47"

General Classification after Stage 1

	Rider	Team	Time
1	Lisa Brennauer (GER)	Velocio–SRAM Pro Cycling	2h 53' 14"
2	Lizzie Armitstead (GBR)	Team SD Worx–Protime	+ 11"
3	Evelyn Stevens (USA)	Velocio–SRAM Pro Cycling	+ 34"
4	Christine Majerus (LUX)	Team SD Worx–Protime	+ 1' 02"
5	Trixi Worrack (GER)	Velocio–SRAM Pro Cycling	+ 1' 05"
6	Stephanie Pohl (GER)	Germany (National team)	+ 1' 05"
7	Sarah Roy (AUS)	Australia (National team)	+ 1' 06"
8	Lizzie Williams (AUS)	Australia (National team)	+ 1' 12"
9	Romy Kasper (GER)	Team SD Worx–Protime	+ 1' 14"
10	Hanka Kupfernagel (GER)	Team Maxx Solar Cycling	+ 1' 17"

=== Stage 2 ===
16 July 2014, – Schleiz to Schleiz, 105 km (65.2 mi)

Stage 2 result

	Rider	Team	Time
1	Romy Kasper (GER)	Team SD Worx–Protime	2h 55' 25"
2	Reta Trotman (NZL)	Team Maxx Solar Cycling	+ 2"
3	Lizzie Armitstead (GBR)	Team SD Worx–Protime	+ 29"
4	Lisa Brennauer (GER)	Velocio–SRAM Pro Cycling	+ 29"
5	Christine Majerus (LUX)	Team SD Worx–Protime	+ 29"
6	Désirée Ehrler (SWI)	Bigla Cycling Team	+ 29"
7	Gracie Elvin (AUS)	Orica–AIS	+ 29"
8	Lizzie Williams (AUS)	Australia (National team)	+ 29"
9	Stephanie Pohl (GER)	Germany (National team)	+ 29"
10	Annelies Van Doorslaer (BEL)	Futurumshop.nl–Zannata	+ 29"

General Classification after Stage 2

	Rider	Team	Time
1	Lisa Brennauer (GER)	Velocio–SRAM Pro Cycling	5h 49' 08"
2	Lizzie Armitstead (GBR)	Team SD Worx–Protime	+ 6"
3	Romy Kasper (GER)	Team SD Worx–Protime	+ 32"
4	Evelyn Stevens (USA)	Velocio–SRAM Pro Cycling	+ 34"
5	Reta Trotman (NZL)	Team Maxx Solar Cycling	+ 55"
6	Christine Majerus (LUX)	Team SD Worx–Protime	+ 1' 02"
7	Trixi Worrack (GER)	Velocio–SRAM Pro Cycling	+ 1' 05"
8	Stephanie Pohl (GER)	Germany (National team)	+ 1' 05"
9	Lizzie Williams (AUS)	Australia (National team)	+ 1' 12"
10	Sofie De Vuyst (BEL)	Futurumshop.nl–Zannata	+ 1' 18"

=== Stage 3 ===
17 July 2014 – Gera to Gera (individual time trial), 22.0 km (13.7 mi)

Stage 3 result

	Rider	Team	Time
1	Lisa Brennauer (GER)	Velocio–SRAM Pro Cycling	28' 59"
2	Evelyn Stevens (USA)	Velocio–SRAM Pro Cycling	+ 17"
3	Trixi Worrack (GER)	Velocio–SRAM Pro Cycling	+ 49"
4	Esther Fennel (GER)	Koga Ladies–Central Rhede Cycling Team	+ 1' 23"
5	Christine Majerus (LUX)	Team SD Worx–Protime	+ 1' 29"
6	Gracie Elvin (AUS)	Orica–AIS	+ 1' 39"
7	Lizzie Armitstead (GBR)	Team SD Worx–Protime	+ 1' 42"
8	Reta Trotman (NZL)	Team Maxx Solar Cycling	+ 1' 58"
9	Madeline Ortmuller (GER)	Germany (National team)	+ 2' 08"
10	Elke Gebhardt (GER)	Bigla Cycling Team	+ 2' 13"

General Classification after Stage 3

	Rider	Team	Time
1	Lisa Brennauer (GER)	Velocio–SRAM Pro Cycling	6h 17' 57"
2	Evelyn Stevens (USA)	Velocio–SRAM Pro Cycling	+ 55"
3	Lizzie Armitstead (GBR)	Team SD Worx–Protime	+ 1' 58"
4	Trixi Worrack (GER)	Velocio–SRAM Pro Cycling	+ 2' 00"
5	Christine Majerus (LUX)	Team SD Worx–Protime	+ 2' 41"
6	Reta Trotman (NZL)	Team Maxx Solar Cycling	+ 3' 03"
7	Gracie Elvin (AUS)	Orica–AIS	+ 3' 32"
8	Stephanie Pohl (GER)	Germany (National team)	+ 3' 45"
9	Joanne Hogan (AUS)	Bigla Cycling Team	+ 4' 15"
10	Anna Plichta (POL)	TKK Pacific Toruń	+ 4' 33"

=== Stage 4 ===
18 July 2014 – Saalfeld to Saalfeld, 124.6 km (77.4 mi)

Stage 4 result

	Rider	Team	Time
1	Evelyn Stevens (USA)	Velocio–SRAM Pro Cycling	3h 35' 33"
2	Lizzie Armitstead (GBR)	Team SD Worx–Protime	+ 1"
3	Reta Trotman (NZL)	Team Maxx Solar Cycling	+ 2' 08"
4	Lisa Brennauer (GER)	Velocio–SRAM Pro Cycling	+ 2' 13"
5	Paulina Brzeźna (POL)	TKK Pacific Toruń	+ 2' 34"
6	Christine Majerus (LUX)	Team SD Worx–Protime	+ 2' 34"
7	Lizzie Williams (AUS)	Australia (National team)	+ 2' 34"
8	Sofie De Vuyst (BEL)	Futurumshop.nl–Zannata	+ 2' 34"
9	Joanne Hogan (AUS)	Bigla Cycling Team	+ 2' 36"
10	Stephanie Pohl (GER)	Germany (National team)	+ 2' 37"

General Classification after Stage 4

	Rider	Team	Time
1	Evelyn Stevens (USA)	Velocio–SRAM Pro Cycling	9h 54' 21"
2	Lizzie Armitstead (GBR)	Team SD Worx–Protime	+ 56"
3	Lisa Brennauer (GER)	Velocio–SRAM Pro Cycling	+ 1' 31"
4	Reta Trotman (NZL)	Team Maxx Solar Cycling	+ 4' 15"
5	Christine Majerus (LUX)	Team SD Worx–Protime	+ 4' 20"
6	Stephanie Pohl (GER)	Germany (National team)	+ 5' 31"
7	Joanne Hogan (AUS)	Bigla Cycling Team	+ 6' 00"
8	Anna Plichta (POL)	TKK Pacific Toruń	+ 6' 37"
9	Sofie De Vuyst (BEL)	Futurumshop.nl–Zannata	+ 6' 41"
10	Lizzie Williams (AUS)	Australia (National team)	+ 7' 07"

=== Stage 5 ===
19 July 2014 – Schmölln to Schmölln, 114 km (70.8 mi)

Stage 5 result

	Rider	Team	Time
1	Beate Zanner (GER)	Team Maxx Solar Cycling	3h 14' 11"
2	Taryn Heather (AUS)	Bigla Cycling Team	s.t.
3	Lizzie Armitstead (GBR)	Team SD Worx–Protime	+ 3' 44"
4	Trixi Worrack (GER)	Velocio–SRAM Pro Cycling	+ 3' 45"
5	Christine Majerus (LUX)	Team SD Worx–Protime	+ 3' 47"
6	Evelyn Stevens (USA)	Velocio–SRAM Pro Cycling	+ 3' 47"
7	Lisa Brennauer (GER)	Velocio–SRAM Pro Cycling	+ 3' 47"
8	Lizzie Williams (AUS)	Australia (National team)	+ 3' 55"
9	Katarzyna Wilkos (POL)	TKK Pacific Toruń	+ 4' 06"
10	Ana Bianca Schnitzmeier (GER)	Germany (National team)	+ 4' 06"

General Classification after Stage 5

	Rider	Team	Time
1	Evelyn Stevens (USA)	Velocio–SRAM Pro Cycling	13h 12' 19"
2	Lizzie Armitstead (GBR)	Team SD Worx–Protime	+ 49"
3	Lisa Brennauer (GER)	Velocio–SRAM Pro Cycling	+ 1' 31"
4	Christine Majerus (LUX)	Team SD Worx–Protime	+ 4' 19"
5	Reta Trotman (NZL)	Team Maxx Solar Cycling	+ 4' 44"
6	Stephanie Pohl (GER)	Germany (National team)	+ 6' 00"
7	Beate Zanner (GER)	Team Maxx Solar Cycling	+ 6' 20"
8	Joanne Hogan (AUS)	Bigla Cycling Team	+ 6' 25"
9	Sofie De Vuyst (BEL)	Futurumshop.nl–Zannata	+ 7' 04"
10	Anna Plichta (POL)	TKK Pacific Toruń	+ 7' 06"

=== Stage 6 ===
20 July 2013 – Zeulenroda-Triebes to Zeulenroda-Triebes, 120 km (74.6 mi)

Stage 6 result

	Rider	Team	Time
1	Elke Gebhardt (GER)	Bigla Cycling Team	3h 16' 01"
2	Lizzie Armitstead (GBR)	Team SD Worx–Protime	s.t.
3	Reta Trotman (NZL)	Team Maxx Solar Cycling	+ 1"
4	Lizzie Williams (AUS)	Australia (National team)	+ 2"
5	Paulina Brzeźna (POL)	TKK Pacific Torun	+ 2"
6	Sofie De Vuyst (BEL)	Futurumshop.nl–Zannata	+ 2"
7	Melanie Wotsch (GER)	Stevens-Hytera	+ 2"
8	Lisa Brennauer (GER)	Velocio–SRAM Pro Cycling	+ 2"
9	Jacqueline Hahn (AUT)	Bigla Cycling Team	+ 2"
10	Anna Plichta (POL)	TKK Pacific Toruń	+ 2"

Final General Classification

	Rider	Team	Time
1	Evelyn Stevens (USA)	Velocio–SRAM Pro Cycling	16h 28' 21"
2	Lizzie Armitstead (GBR)	Team SD Worx–Protime	+ 42"
3	Lisa Brennauer (GER)	Velocio–SRAM Pro Cycling	+ 1' 31"
4	Christine Majerus (LUX)	Team SD Worx–Protime	+ 4' 15"
5	Reta Trotman (NZL)	Team Maxx Solar Cycling	+ 4' 40"
6	Stephanie Pohl (GER)	Germany (National team)	+ 6' 01"
7	Beate Zanner (GER)	Team Maxx Solar Cycling	+ 6' 21"
8	Joanne Hogan (AUS)	Bigla Cycling Team	+ 6' 26"
9	Sofie De Vuyst (BEL)	Futurumshop.nl–Zannata	+ 7' 05"
10	Anna Plichta (POL)	TKK Pacific Toruń	+ 7' 07"

== Classification leadership ==
Stage	Winner	General classification	Points classification	Mountains classification	Young rider classification	Amateur rider classification	Active rider classification	Best German rider	Team classification
P	Lisa Brennauer	Lisa Brennauer	Christine Majerus	Trixi Worrack	Demi de Jong	Stephanie Pohl	Stephanie Pohl	Lisa Brennauer	Velocio–SRAM Pro Cycling
1	Lizzie Armitstead	Lisa Brennauer	Lizzie Armitstead	Lizzie Armitstead	Demi de Jong	Stephanie Pohl	Evelyn Stevens	Lisa Brennauer	Velocio–SRAM Pro Cycling
2	Romy Kasper	Lisa Brennauer	Lizzie Armitstead	Romy Kasper	Katarzyna Wilkos	Stephanie Pohl	Romy Kasper	Lisa Brennauer	Velocio–SRAM Pro Cycling
3	Lisa Brennauer	Lisa Brennauer	Lizzie Armitstead	Romy Kasper	Anna Plichta	Reta Trotman	Not Awarded	Lisa Brennauer	Velocio–SRAM Pro Cycling
4	Evelyn Stevens	Evelyn Stevens	Lizzie Armitstead	Lizzie Armitstead	Anna Plichta	Reta Trotman	Gracie Elvin	Lisa Brennauer	Velocio–SRAM Pro Cycling
5	Beate Zanner	Evelyn Stevens	Lizzie Armitstead	Beate Zanner	Anna Plichta	Reta Trotman		Lisa Brennauer	Velocio–SRAM Pro Cycling
6	Elke Gebhardt	Evelyn Stevens	Lizzie Armitstead	Lizzie Armitstead	Anna Plichta	Reta Trotman		Lisa Brennauer	Velocio–SRAM Pro Cycling
Final		Evelyn Stevens	Lizzie Armitstead	Lizzie Armitstead	Anna Plichta	Reta Trotman		Lisa Brennauer	Velocio–SRAM Pro Cycling

== See also ==
- Thüringen Rundfahrt der Frauen
- 2014 in women's road cycling
