= 2016 Le Samyn des Dames =

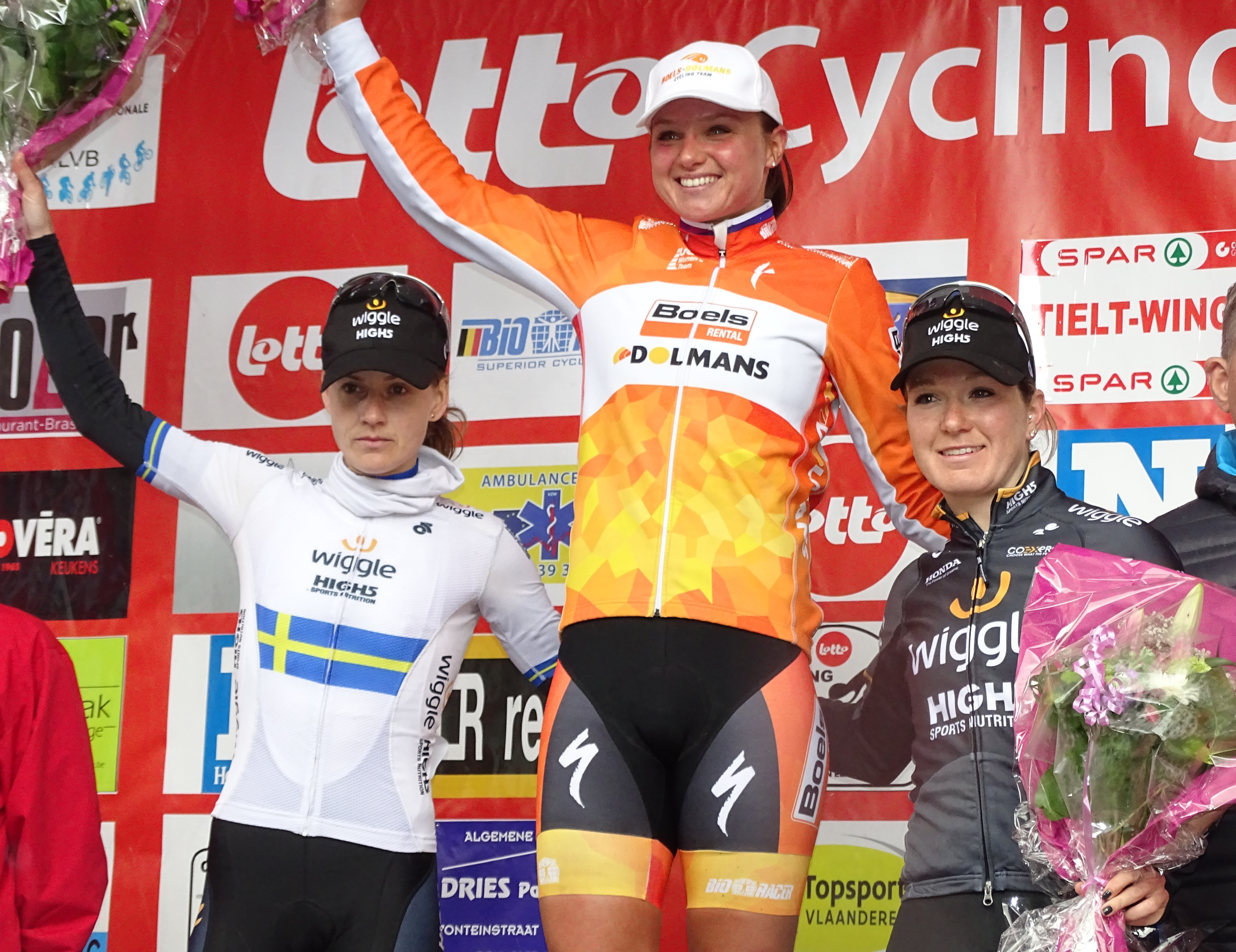
- Chantal Blaak (centre), Emma Johansson (left) and Amy Pieters on the podium after the race

Race details
- Dates: 2 March 2016
- Stages: 1
- Distance: 112.8 km (70.1 mi)
- Winning time: 3h 03' 36"

Results
	Winner	Chantal Blaak (NED)	(Boels–Dolmans)
	Second	Emma Johansson (SWE)	(Wiggle High5)
	Third	Amy Pieters (NED)	(Wiggle High5)

The 2016 Le Samyn des Dames was the fifth running of the women's Le Samyn, a women's bicycle race in Hainaut, Belgium. It was held on 2 March 2016 over a distance of 112.8 kilometres (70.1 miles) starting in Quaregnon and finishing in Dour. It was rated by the UCI as a 1.2 category race.

== Result ==
Result
Rank	Rider	Team	Time
1	Chantal Blaak (NED)	Boels–Dolmans	3h 03' 036"
2	Emma Johansson (SWE)	Wiggle High5	+ 0"
3	Amy Pieters (NED)	Wiggle High5	+ 14"
4	Floortje Mackaij (NED)	Team Liv–Plantur	+ 14"
5	Demi de Jong (NED)	Boels–Dolmans	+ 14"
6	Nikki Harris (GBR)	Boels–Dolmans	+ 14"
7	Christine Majerus (LUX)	Boels–Dolmans	+ 18"
8	Kelly Druyts (BEL)	Topsport Vlaanderen–Pro-Duo	+ 41"
9	Lauren Kitchen (AUS)	Hitec Products	+ 48"
10	Roxane Fournier (FRA)	Poitou–Charentes.Futuroscope.86	+ 48"

== See also ==
- 2016 in women's road cycling
