= 2019 Belgium Tour =

2019 Lotto Belgium Tour
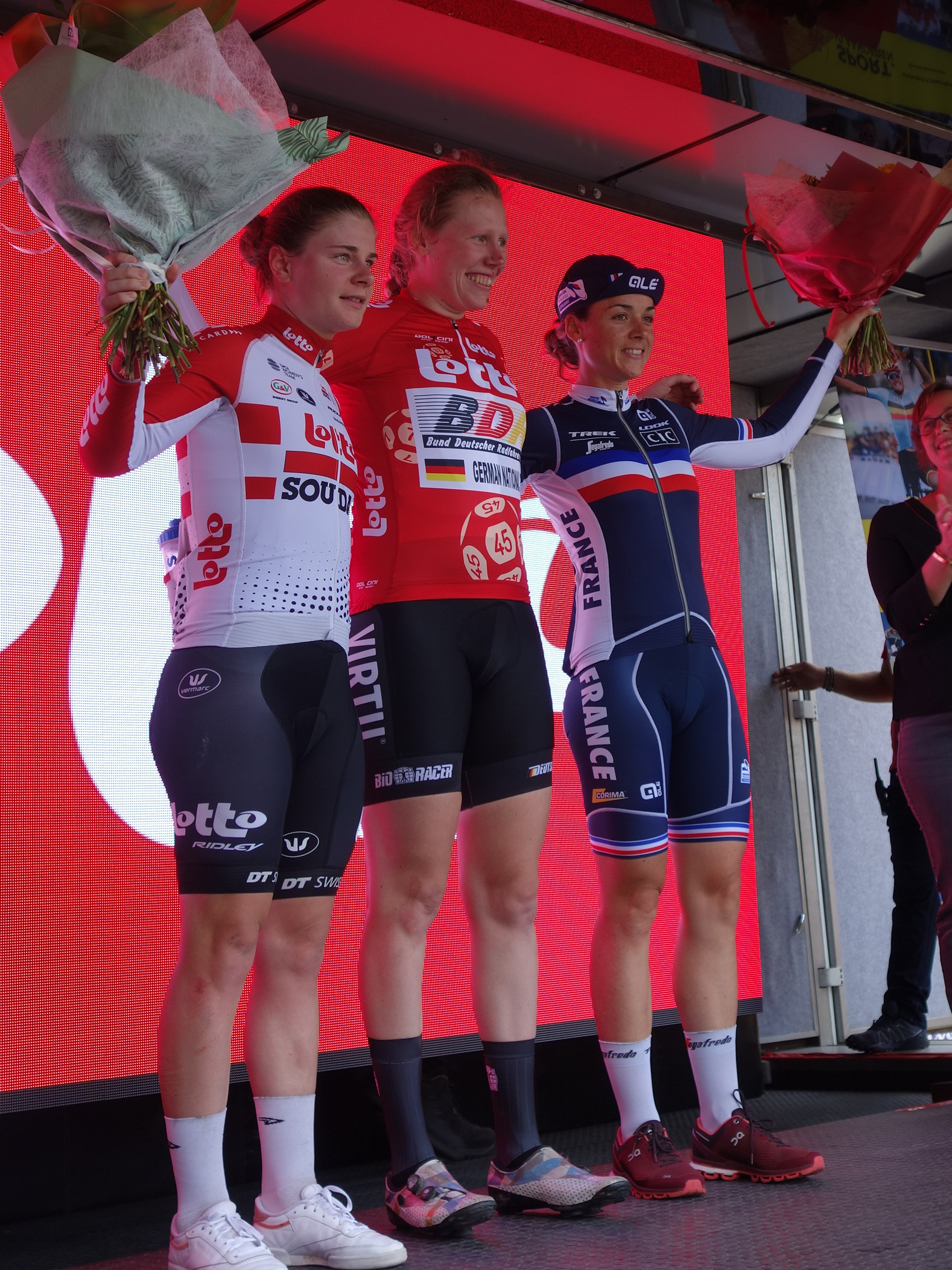
- Final podium: 2. Kopecky 1. Kröger 3. Cordon-Ragot

Race details
- Dates: 10–13 September 2019
- Stages: 4

Results
Jersey awarded to the overall winner	Winner	Mieke Kröger (GER)	(Germany (National team))
	Second	Lotte Kopecky (BEL)	(Lotto–Soudal Ladies)
	Third	Audrey Cordon-Ragot (FRA)	(France (National team))
Jersey awarded to the points classification winner	Points	Coryn Rivera (USA)	(United States (National team))
Jersey awarded to the mountains classification winner	Mountains	Sofie De Vuyst (BEL)	(Parkhotel Valkenburg)
Jersey awarded to the youth classification winner	Youth	Liane Lippert (GER)	(Germany (National team))
	Team	Germany (National team)	

The 2019 Lotto Belgium Tour is the seventh edition of the Lotto Belgium Tour, previous called Lotto-Decca Tour, a women's cycle stage race in Belgium. The tour has an UCI rating of 2.1.

== Stages ==
List of stages
Stage	Date	Course	Distance	Type	Winner
P	10 September	Circuit Jules Tacheny	5 km (3.1 mi)	Prologue	Ruth Winder (USA)
1	11 September	Moorslede to Dadizele	115 km (71.5 mi)	Flat stage	Mieke Kröger (GER)
2	7 September	Willebroek to Willebroek	129 km (80.2 mi)	Flat stage	Coryn Rivera (USA)
3	8 September	Geraardsbergen to Geraardsbergen	85.9 km (53.4 mi)	Flat stage	Coryn Rivera (USA)
Total			334.9 km (208.1 mi)		

== Classification leadership ==
Stage	Winner	General classification	Points classification	Mountains classification	Young rider classification	Team classification
P	Ruth Winder	Ruth Winder	Not awarded	Not awarded	Christa Riffel	Germany (National Team)
1	Mieke Kröger	Mieke Kröger	Mieke Kröger	Sofie De Vuyst	Christa Riffel	Germany (National Team)
2	Coryn Rivera	Mieke Kröger	Mieke Kröger	Sofie De Vuyst	Susanne Andersen	Germany (National Team)
3	Coryn Rivera	Mieke Kröger	Coryn Rivera	Sofie De Vuyst	Liane Lippert	Germany (National Team)
Final Classification		Mieke Kröger	Coryn Rivera	Sofie De Vuyst	Liane Lippert	Germany (National Team)

== See also ==
- 2019 in women's road cycling
