= 2014 Le Samyn des Dames =

Race details
- Dates: 5 March 2014
- Stages: 1
- Distance: 119.2 km (74.07 mi)
- Winning time: 2h 48' 25"

Results
	Winner	Emma Johansson (Sweden)	(Orica–AIS)
	Second	Ashleigh Moolman (South Africa)	(Hitec Products UCK)
	Third	Sofie De Vuyst (Belgium)	(Futurumshop.nl–Zannata)

The 2014 Le Samyn des Dames was the third running of the women's Le Samyn, a women's bicycle race in Fayt-le-Franc, Belgium. It was held on 5 March 2014 over a distance of 119.2 kilometres (74.1 miles) starting in Frameries and finishing in Dour. It was rated by the UCI as a 1.2 category race.

== Results ==
	Cyclist	Team	Time
1	Emma Johansson (SWE)	Orica–AIS	2h 48' 25"
2	Ashleigh Moolman (RSA)	Hitec Products UCK	s.t.
3	Sofie De Vuyst (BEL)	Futurumshop.nl–Zannata	s.t.
4	Ellen van Dijk (NED)	Boels–Dolmans Cycling Team	s.t.
5	Maaike Polspoel (BEL)	Team Giant–Shimano	s.t.
6	Maura Kinsella (USA)	Optum p/b Kelly Benefit Strategies	s.t.
7	Amy Pieters (NED)	Team Giant–Shimano	s.t.
8	Elisa Longo Borghini (ITA)	Hitec Products UCK	s.t.
9	Emilia Fahlin (SWE)	Wiggle–Honda	s.t.
10	Jo Kiesanowski (NZL)	Team TIBCO	s.t.

== See also ==
- 2014 in women's road cycling
