= Sofie De Vuyst =

Belgian cyclist

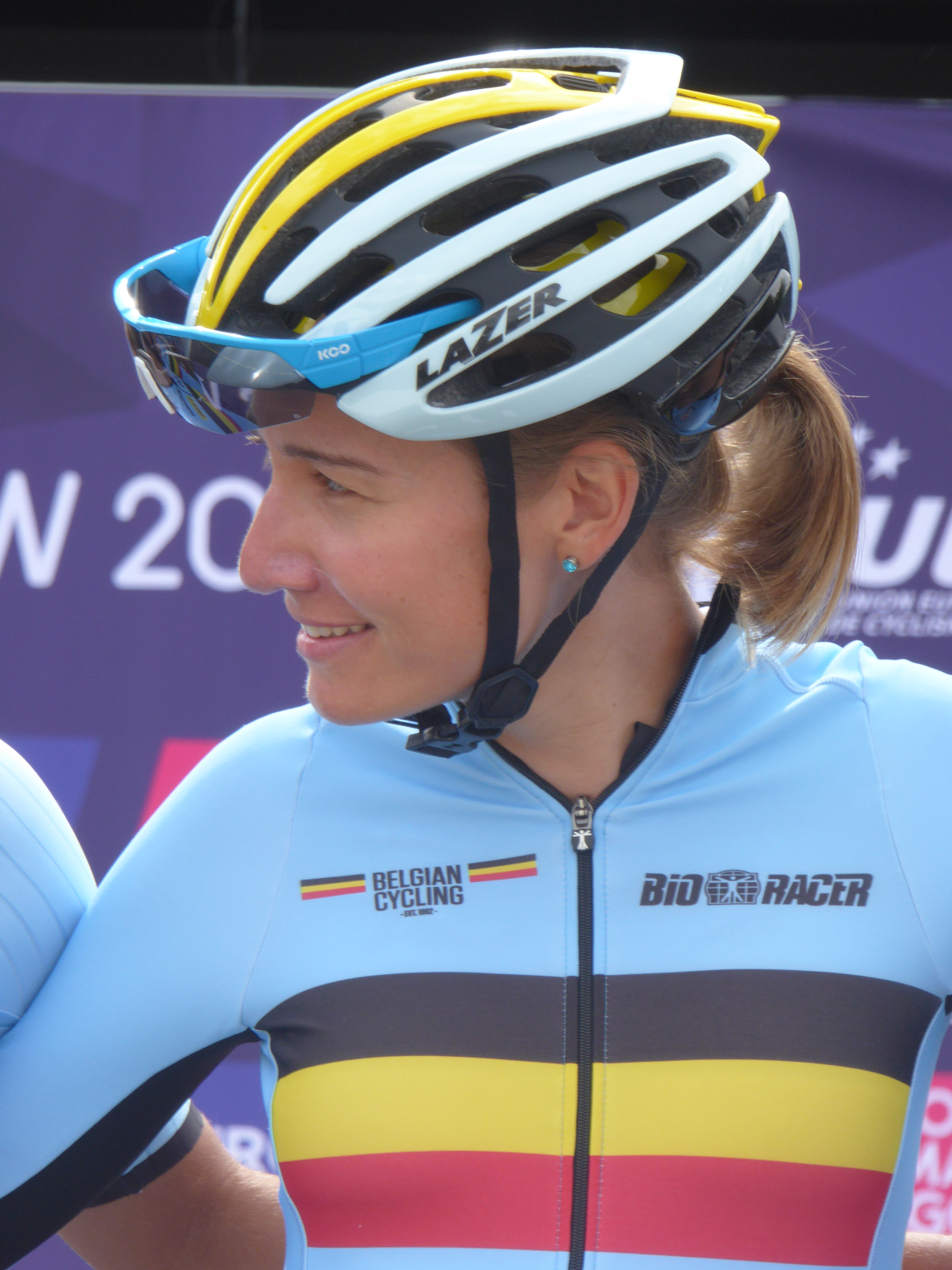
- De Vuyst at the 2018 European Road Cycling Championships.

Personal information
- Full name: Sofie De Vuyst
- Born: 2 April 1987 (age 39) Zottegem, Belgium

Cycling career
- Sport: Cycling
- Current team: Retired
- Discipline: Road
- Role: Rider

Professional teams
- 2006–2007: Lotto–Belisol Ladiesteam
- 2008: Topsport Vlaanderen–Thompson Ladies Team
- 2009–2012: Lotto–Belisol Ladiesteam
- 2013: Sengers Ladies Cycling Team
- 2014–2015: Futurumshop.nl–Zannata
- 2016: Lotto–Soudal Ladies
- 2017–2018: Lares–Waowdeals
- 2019: Parkhotel Valkenburg

Major wins
- Brabantse Pijl (2019)

Sofie De Vuyst (born 2 April 1987) is a Belgian former racing cyclist, who rode professionally between 2006 and 2019. Between 2010 and 2016 she competed in every UCI Road World Championships. She was voted 2019 Flandrienne of the Year (best Belgian female cyclist).

In September 2019, De Vuyst tested positive for an exogenous steroid in an out of competition control. De Vuyst's positive test came on 18 September, in the week after the Belgium Tour, where she finished seventh overall and won the mountains classification, and before the UCI Road World Championships. A contract that she had signed for 2020 with Mitchelton–Scott was suspended as a result of her positive test.

== Major results ==
2009
3rd Dwars door de Westhoek
2011
2nd Road race, National Road Championships
4th Erondegemse Pijl
5th Omloop van het Hageland
6th Halle-Buizingen
6th Dwars door de Westhoek
8th Overall Tour Féminin en Limousin
2012
2nd Time trial, National Road Championships
2nd Overall Tour de Bretagne Féminin
8th Overall Belgium Tour
8th Erondegemse Pijl
2013
2nd Erondegemse Pijl
3rd Road race, National Road Championships
7th Overall Belgium Tour

1st Mountains classification
1st Belgian rider classification

8th Overall Tour de Bretagne Féminin
8th Cholet Pays de Loire Dames
9th Le Samyn des Dames
9th Knokke-Heist – Bredene
2014
3rd Road race, National Road Championships
3rd Le Samyn des Dames
4th Gent–Wevelgem
5th Omloop van het Hageland
6th Omloop Het Nieuwsblad
7th Diamond Tour
8th Erondegemse Pijl
9th Overall Internationale Thüringen Rundfahrt der Frauen
9th Overall Belgium Tour
9th Trofee Maarten Wynants
9th Holland Hills Classic
2015
National Road Championships

3rd Road race
3rd Time trial

4th Trofee Maarten Wynants
7th Overall Auensteiner–Radsporttage
8th Overall Belgium Tour
9th Gooik–Geraardsbergen–Gooik
10th Dwars door Vlaanderen
2016
5th Overall Trophée d'Or Féminin
9th Pajot Hills Classic
2018
3rd Overall Tour de Feminin-O cenu Českého Švýcarska

1st Stage 5

3rd Kreiz Breizh Elites Dames
4th Gooik–Geraardsbergen–Gooik
8th Overall Tour Cycliste Féminin International de l'Ardèche
10th Brabantse Pijl Dames Gooik
10th La Classique Morbihan
10th Grand Prix de Plumelec-Morbihan Dames
2019
1st Brabantse Pijl Dames Gooik
1st Mountains classification Grand Prix Elsy Jacobs
2nd La Classique Morbihan
3rd Erondegemse Pijl
6th Dwars door Vlaanderen for Women
6th Grand Prix de Plumelec-Morbihan Dames
7th Overall Belgium Tour

1st Mountains classification

7th GP de Plouay – Bretagne
8th Omloop Het Nieuwsblad
8th Omloop van het Hageland

== See also ==
- 2006 Lotto–Belisol Ladiesteam season
- 2009 Lotto–Belisol Ladiesteam season
