= 2014 Erondegemse Pijl =

Race details
- Dates: 2 August 2014
- Distance: 119 km (74 mi)
- Winning time: 37.808 km/h

Results
	Winner	Ann-Sophie Duyck (BEL)	(Autoglas Wetteren Cycling Team)
	Second	Liesbet De Vocht (BEL)	(Lotto–Intermarché Ladies)
	Third	Désirée Ehrler (SUI)	(Bigla Cycling Team)

The 2014 Erondegemse Pijl (Erpe-Mere) was a one-day women's cycle race held in Belgium, from Erpe to Erondegem. on August 2 2014. The tour has an UCI rating of 1.2.

== Results ==
Result

	Rider	Team	Time
1	Ann-Sophie Duyck (BEL)	Autoglas Wetteren Cycling Team	3h 05' 07"
2	Liesbet De Vocht (BEL)	Lotto–Intermarché Ladies	+ 8"
3	Désirée Ehrler (SUI)	Bigla Cycling Team	+ 8"
4	Nina Kessler (NED)	Team SD Worx–Protime	+ 8"
5	Annelies Van Doorslaer (BEL)	Futurumshop.nl–Zannata	+ 8"
6	Élise Delzenne (FRA)	Velocio–SRAM Pro Cycling	+ 8"
7	Fiona Dutriaux (FRA)	Poitou–Charentes.Futuroscope.86	+ 8"
8	Sofie De Vuyst (BEL)	Futurumshop.nl–Zannata	+ 8"
9	Irene San Sebastian (ESP)	Bizkaia–Durango	+ 8"
10	Annelies Dom (BEL)	Futurumshop.nl–Zannata	+ 8"
