= Inge Roggeman =

Belgian cyclist

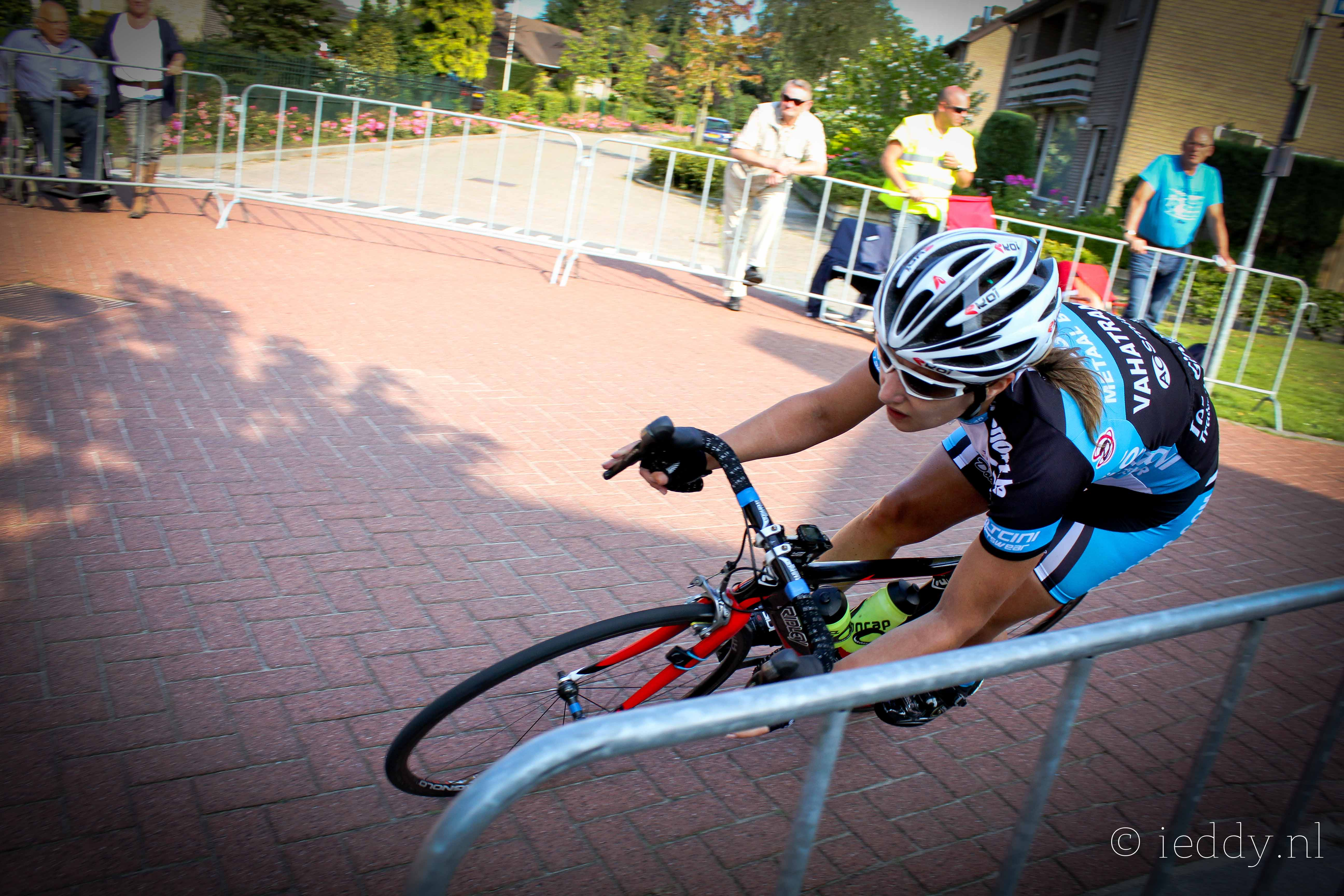
- Roggeman in 2011

Personal information
- Born: 13 April 1981 (age 45) Belgium

Cycling career
- Sport: Cycling
- Discipline: Road cycling

Professional team
- 2012–2013: Sengers Ladies Cycling Team

Inge Roggeman (born 13 April 1981) is a road cyclist from Belgium. She participated at the 2012 UCI Road World Championships in the Women's team time trial for Sengers Ladies Cycling Team.
