= 2014 Omloop Het Nieuwsblad (women's race) =

Race details
- Dates: 1 March 2014
- Stages: 1
- Distance: 126 km (78 mi)
- Winning time: 3h 30' 15"

Results
	Winner	Amy Pieters (The Netherlands)	(Team Giant–Shimano)
	Second	Emma Johansson (Sweden)	(Orica–AIS)
	Third	Lizzie Armitstead (United Kingdom)	(Boels–Dolmans Cycling Team)

The 2014 Omloop Het Nieuwsblad was the 9th edition of the women's Omloop Het Nieuwsblad road cycling one-day race which took place on 1 March. The race started and ended in Ghent and covered 126 km (78 mi) in the province of East Flanders.

The race was won by Dutch rider Amy Pieters with Emma Johansson and Lizzie Armitstead second and third respectively.

== Results ==
Final general classification
Rank	Rider	Team	Time
1	Amy Pieters (NED)	Team Giant–Shimano	3h 30' 15"
2	Emma Johansson (SWE)	Orica–AIS	s.t.
3	Lizzie Armitstead (GBR)	Boels–Dolmans Cycling Team	s.t.
4	Liesbet De Vocht (BEL)	Lotto Belisol Ladies	+ 6"
5	Kirsten Wild (NED)	Team Giant–Shimano	+ 6"
6	Sofie De Vuyst (BEL)	Futurumshop.nl–Zannata	+ 6"
7	Tiffany Cromwell (AUS)	Specialized–lululemon	+ 6"
8	Ashleigh Moolman (RSA)	Hitec Products	+ 6"
9	Annemiek van Vleuten (NED)	Rabobank-Liv Woman Cycling Team	+ 6"
10	Christine Majerus (LUX)	Boels–Dolmans Cycling Team	+ 6"
