= Classica Citta di Padova =

Race details
- Date: September
- Region: Italy
- Discipline: Road
- Type: Road Race
- Web site: www.classicacittadipadova.com/it/

History
- First edition: 2008
- Editions: 5
- Final edition: 2013
- First winner: (Italy) Annalisa Cucinotta
- Most wins: No repeat winners
- Final winner: (Italy) Giorgia Bronzini

Classica Citta di Padova was a women's one-day cycle race which took place in Italy and was ranked by the UCI as 1.1 in 2013 and 1.2 in 2012 having been Nationally ranked in previous seasons.

== Previous winners ==
| Year | Winner | Second | Third |
|---|---|---|---|
NE
| 2008 | (Italy) Annalisa Cucinotta | (Lithuania) Rasa Leleivytė | (Italy) Vania Rossi |
| 2009 | (Italy) Monia Baccaille | (Australia) Kirsty Broun | (Italy) Alessandra D'Ettorre |
| 2010 | (Italy) Noemi Cantele | (Italy) Valentina Scandolara | (Canada) Alison Testroete |
| 2011 | No event held | | |
1.2
| 2012 | (United States) Carmen Small | (Italy) Simona Frapporti | (Italy) Monia Baccaille |
1.1
| 2013 | (Italy) Giorgia Bronzini | (Germany) Trixi Worrack | (Italy) Marta Tagliaferro |
