= Evelyn Arys =

Belgian cyclist

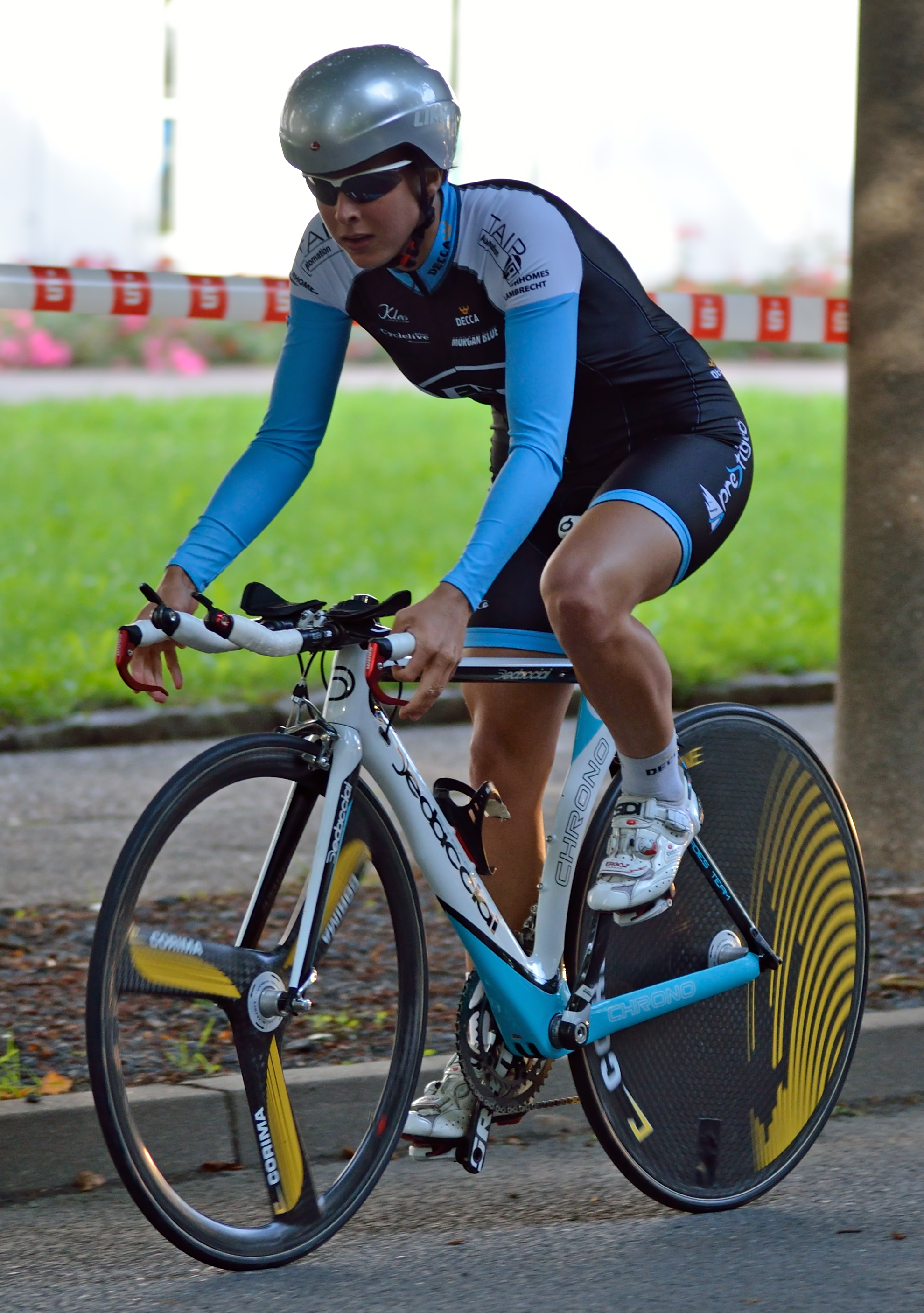
- Arys in 2012

Personal information
- Full name: Evelyn Arys
- Born: 21 July 1990 (age 36) Aalst, Belgium

Cycling career
- Sport: Cycling
- Current team: Retired
- Disciplines: Road; Track
- Role: Rider

Amateur teams
- 2010: Lotto Ladies Team
- 2011: Sengers Ladies Cycling Team

Professional teams
- 2009: Lotto–Belisol Ladiesteam
- 2012: Kleo Ladies Team
- 2013: Sengers Ladies Cycling Team
- 2014–2016: Topsport Vlaanderen–Pro-Duo

Evelyn Arys (born 21 July 1990) is a Belgian former racing cyclist, who rode professionally in 2009, and from 2012 to 2016. She won the Belgian National Road Race Championships in 2011.

== Major results ==
2008
2nd Team pursuit, UEC European Junior Track Championships
4th Road race, UCI Junior World Championships
UEC European Junior Road Championships

8th Time trial
9th Road race

2010
3rd Road race, National Road Championships
2011
1st Road race, National Road Championships
2012
1st Road race, UEC European Under-23 Road Championships
1st Stage 2 (TTT) Trophée d'Or Féminin
7th Erondegemse Pijl
9th Halle-Buizingen
10th GP Stad Roeselare
2013
9th Classica Citta di Padova
2015
5th Diamond Tour

== See also ==
- 2009 Lotto-Belisol Ladiesteam season
