= Kimberly Buyl =

Belgian cyclist

Personal information
- Born: 11 September 1988 (age 38) Belgium

Cycling career
- Sport: Cycling
- Discipline: Road cycling

Professional team
- 2012–2013: Sengers Ladies Cycling Team

Kimberly Buyl (born 11 September 1988) is a road cyclist from Belgium. She participated at the 2012 UCI Road World Championships in the Women's team time trial for Sengers Ladies Cycling Team.
