= Roxane Fournier =

French cyclist (born 1991)

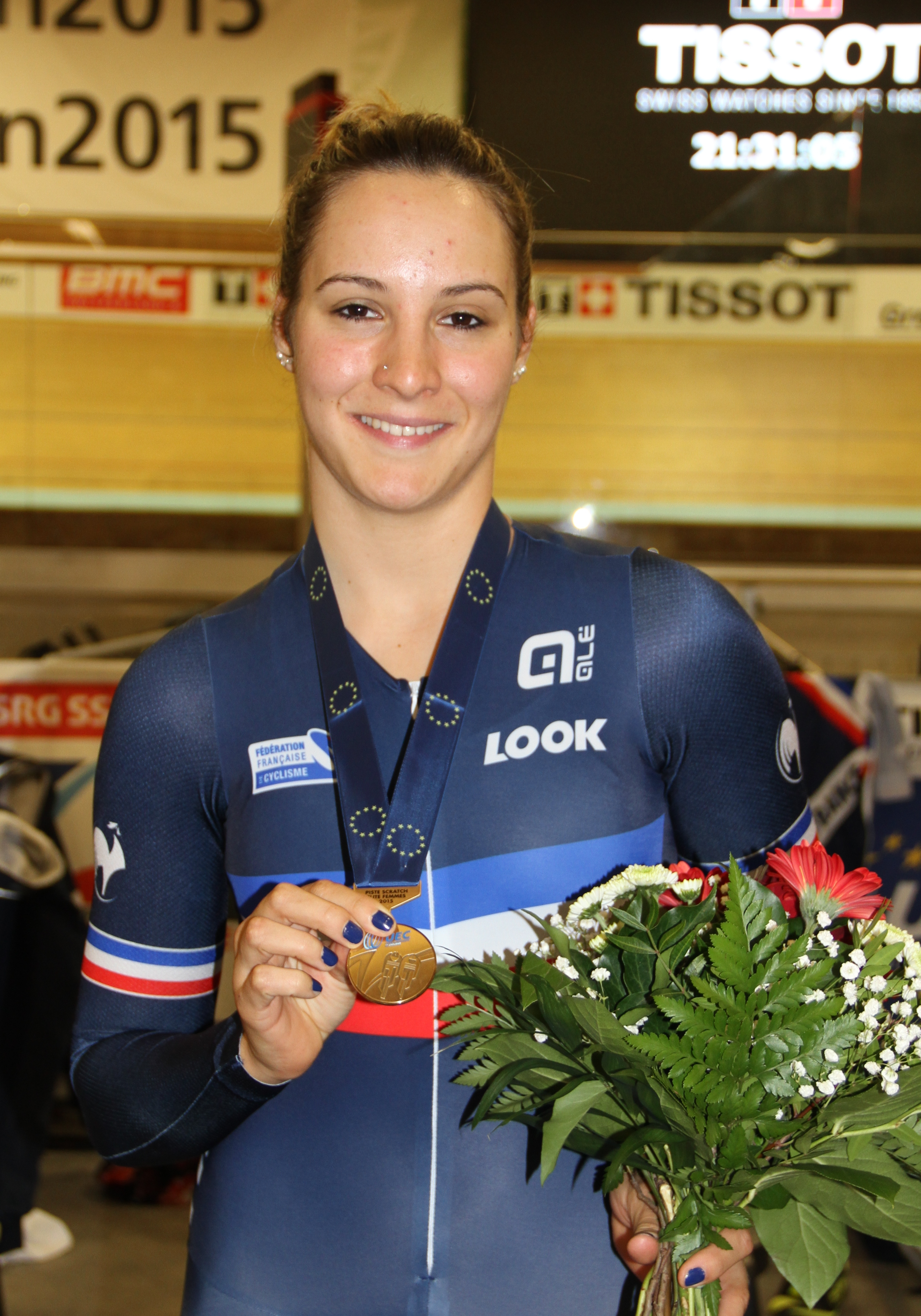
- Fournier at the 2015 UEC European Track Championships

Personal information
- Full name: Roxane Fournier
- Nickname: Roxy
- Born: 7 November 1991 (age 34) Soisy-sous-Montmorency, France

Cycling career
- Sport: Cycling
- Current team: Retired
- Disciplines: Road; Track
- Role: Rider
- Rider type: Sprinter

Amateur teams
- 2011: ASPTT Dijon-Bourgogne
- 2012–2013: BigMat–Auber'93
- 2020: Casa Dorada Women Cycling

Professional teams
- 2010–2011: Specialized Mazda Samson
- 2014–2018: Poitou-Charentes.Futuroscope.86
- 2019: Movistar Team
- 2020: Chevalmeire Cycling Team
- 2021–2022: SD Worx
- 2023–2024: St. Michel–Mavic–Auber93

Roxane Fournier (born 7 November 1991) is a French former racing cyclist, who competed as a professional from 2010 until June 2024.

== Major results ==
=== Road ===
2008
3rd Cergy Criterium
2009
1st Stage 4 Junior Omloop van Borsele
National Junior Road Championships

2nd Road race
3rd Time trial

2012
1st Wanze Road Race
1st Stage 3 Tour de Bretagne Féminin
5th Road race, UEC European Under-23 Road Championships
2013
1st Stage 4 Tour de Bretagne Féminin
2014
1st Stage 1 Trophée d'Or Féminin
4th Overall Tour of Chongming Island
5th Grand Prix de Dottignies
10th La Course by Le Tour de France
2015
1st Grand Prix de Dottignies
1st Stage 1 Tour Cycliste Féminin International de l'Ardèche
2nd Overall Tour of Chongming Island

1st Stage 3

4th La Madrid Challenge by La Vuelta
9th Tour of Chongming Island World Cup
2016
La Route de France

1st Stages 2 & 7

1st Stage 3 Tour of Zhoushan Island
2nd SwissEver GP Cham-Hagendorn
3rd Grand Prix de Dottignies
5th Overall Tour of Chongming Island
5th La Course by Le Tour de France
6th Road race, UCI Road World Championships
9th Madrid Challenge by La Vuelta
10th Le Samyn des Dames
2017
3rd Madrid Challenge by La Vuelta
4th Road race, UEC European Road Championships
4th Pajot Hills Classic
4th Trofee Maarten Wynants
6th Omloop van het Hageland
8th Prudential RideLondon Classique
2018
2nd Grand Prix International d'Isbergues
4th Drentse Acht van Westerveld
6th Omloop van het Hageland
7th Gran Premio Bruno Beghelli Internazionale Donne Elite
8th Ronde van Drenthe
9th Le Samyn des Dames
2019
4th Omloop van het Hageland
4th Clasica Femenina Navarra
6th Vuelta a la Comunitat Valenciana Feminas
10th Nokere Koerse
2021
10th Dwars door het Hageland
2023
5th Dwars door het Hageland
6th Overall Tour de Normandie Féminin
10th Le Samyn des Dames
2024
9th Overall RideLondon Classique

=== Track ===
2009
National Junior Track Championships

1st Individual pursuit
2nd Points race

3rd Scratch, UEC European Junior Track Championships
2010
3rd Points race, National Track Championships
2013
National Track Championships

1st Team sprint
2nd Scratch

2014
1st Team pursuit, National Track Championships
2015
1st Team pursuit, National Track Championships
3rd Scratch, UEC European Track Championships
2016
National Track Championships

1st Scratch
1st Team pursuit

Fenioux France Trophy

2nd Scratch
3rd Points race
