= 2013 Grand Prix de Dottignies =

Race details
- Dates: 1 April 2013
- Distance: 113.2 km (70.3 mi)

Results
	Winner	Vera Koedooder (NED)	(Sengers Ladies Cycling Team)
	Second	Iris Slappendel (NED)	(Rabobank-Liv Giant)
	Third	Sanne van Paassen (NED)	(Rabobank-Liv Giant)

The 2013 Grand Prix de Dottignies was the 12th edition of a one-day women's cycle race held in Dottignies, Belgium on April 1 2013. The tour has an UCI rating of 1.2. The race was won by Vera Koedooder of Sengers Ladies Cycling Team, fending off the Rabobank-Liv Giant duo of Iris Slappendel and Sanne van Paassen

Result

	Rider	Team	Time
1	Vera Koedooder (NED)	Sengers Ladies Cycling Team	2h 57' 23"
2	Iris Slappendel (NED)	Rabobank-Liv Giant	+ 6"
3	Sanne van Paassen (NED)	Rabobank-Liv Giant	+ 48"
4	Laura Trott (GBR)	Wiggle–Honda	+ 48"
5	Katarzyna Pawłowska (POL)	GSD Gestion – Kallisto	+ 48"
6	Alena Amialiusik (BLR)	Be Pink	+ 48"
7	Roxane Knetemann (NED)	Rabobank-Liv Giant	+ 48"
8	Esther Fennel (GER)	Koga Ladies Central Rhede CT	+ 48"
9	Emilia Fahlin (SWE)	Hitec Products UCK	+ 1' 33"
10	Alexandra Burchenkova (RUS)	RusVelo	+ 1' 33"
