= 2013 Erondegemse Pijl =

Race details
- Dates: 3 August 2013

Results
	Winner	Maaike Polspoel (BEL)	(Sengers Ladies Cycling Team)
	Second	Sofie De Vuyst (BEL)	(Sengers Ladies Cycling Team)
	Third	Christine Majerus (LUX)	(Sengers Ladies Cycling Team)

The 2013 Erondegemse Pijl (Erpe-Mere) was a one-day women's cycle race held in Belgium, from Erpe to Erondegem. on August 3 2013. The tour has an UCI rating of 1.2. The race resulted in a clean sweep of the podium by Sengers Ladies Cycling Team, with Polspoel, de Vuyst and Majerus finishing first, second and third respectively.

Result

	Rider	Team	Time
1	Maaike Polspoel (BEL)	Sengers Ladies Cycling Team	3h 05' 07"
2	Sofie De Vuyst (BEL)	Sengers Ladies Cycling Team	+ 57"
3	Christine Majerus (LUX)	Sengers Ladies Cycling Team	+ 57"
4	Kirsten Peetoom (NED)		+ 57"
5	Kelly Druyts (BEL)	Topsport Vlaandeen — Bioracer	+ 57"
6	Kim de Baat (NED)	Boels–Dolmans Cycling Team	+ 57"
7	Daniela Gass (GER)	Squadra Scappatella	+ 57"
8	Anna Trevisi (ITA)	Vaiano — Fondriest	+ 57"
9	Monique Van de Ree (NED)	CyclelivePLUS-Zannata Ladies Team	+ 57"
10	Nathalie Lamborelle (LUX)	Bigla Cycling Team	+ 57"
