= Maaike Polspoel =

Belgian cyclist

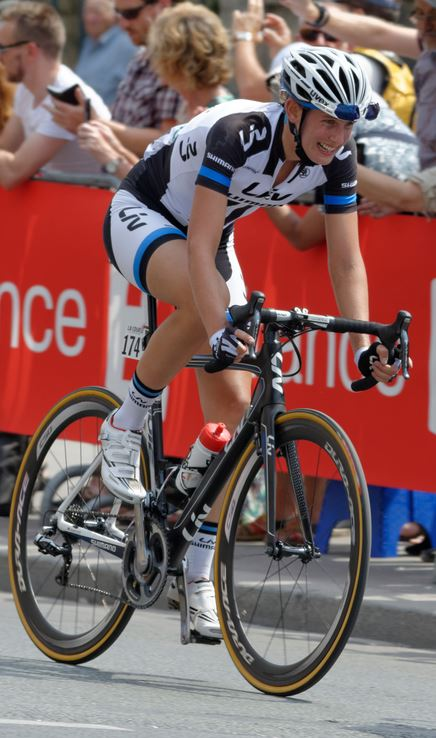

Personal information
- Born: 28 March 1988 (age 38) Vilvoorde, Belgium
- Height: 1.79 m (5 ft 10 in)
- Weight: 59 kg (130 lb)

Cycling career
- Sport: Cycling
- Current team: Retired
- Discipline: Road
- Role: Rider

Professional teams
- 2008–2012: Topsport Vlaanderen–Thompson Ladies Team
- 2013: Sengers Ladies Cycling Team
- 2014–2015: Giant–Shimano
- 2015–2017: Lensworld.eu–Zannata

Maaike Polspoel (born 28 March 1989) is a Belgian former road bicycle racer. She competed at the 2012 Summer Olympics in the Women's road race, finishing 29th.

== Major results ==
2008
3rd Buggenhout-Opstal
8th Grand Prix de Dottignies
2010
3rd Sparkassen Giro
2011
1st Grand Prix Damien Yserbyt
1st Stage 4 Holland Ladies Tour
2nd Time trial, Flemish Brabant Provincial Road Championships
8th GP Ciudad de Valladolid
2012
1st Boortmeerbeek Criterium
2nd Maria-Ter-Heide Criterium
3rd Knokke-Heist-Bredene
3rd Oostduinkerke Criterium
3rd Belsele Criterium
4th Cholet Pays de Loire Dames
2013
1st Erondegemse Pijl
National Road Championships

2nd Road race
2nd Time trial

2nd Gooik–Geraardsbergen–Gooik
2nd Sparkassen Giro Bochum
2014
1st Trofee Maarten Wynants
3rd Time trial, National Road Championships
5th Overall La Route de France
5th Le Samyn des Dames
7th Grand Prix de Dottignies
2015
3rd Team road race, Military World Games
6th Trofee Maarten Wynants
