= 2015 Grand Prix de Dottignies =

Race details
- Dates: 6 April 2015
- Distance: 125 km (77.67 mi)
- Winning time: 3h 09' 28"

Results
	Winner	Roxane Fournier (FRA)	(Poitou-Charentes.Futuroscope.86)
	Second	Chloe Hosking (AUS)	(Wiggle–Honda)
	Third	Pascale Jeuland (FRA)	(Poitou-Charentes.Futuroscope.86)

The 2015 Grand Prix de Dottignies was a one-day women's cycle race held in Belgium on 6 April 2015. The race was given a rating of 1.2 by the Union Cycliste Internationale (UCI), and was won by France's Roxane Fournier.

== Results ==
Result
Rank	Rider	Team	Time
1	Roxane Fournier (FRA)	Poitou-Charentes.Futuroscope.86	3h 09' 28"
2	Chloe Hosking (AUS)	Wiggle–Honda	+ 0"
3	Pascale Jeuland (FRA)	Poitou-Charentes.Futuroscope.86	+ 0"
4	Lotta Lepistö (FIN)	Bigla Pro Cycling Team	+ 0"
5	Lotte Kopecky (BEL)	Topsport Vlaanderen–Pro-Duo	+ 0"
6	Elena Cecchini (ITA)	Lotto–Soudal Ladies	+ 0"
7	Aurore Verhoeven (FRA)	Lointek	+ 0"
8	Élise Delzenne (FRA)	Interrégions Nord-Pas-de-Calais–Picardie	+ 0"
9	Simona Frapporti (ITA)	Alé–Cipollini	+ 0"
10	Kelly Markus (NED)	Mix Team 1 Jan van Arckel	+ 0"

== See also ==
- 2015 in women's road cycling
