= GP Comune di Cornaredo =

Race details
- Date: March
- Region: Italy
- Discipline: Road

History
- First edition: 2008
- Editions: 5 (as of 2014)
- First winner: Andrea Graus (AUT)
- Most wins: Rasa Leleivytė (LTU) (2 wins)
- Most recent: Shelley Olds (USA)

The GP Comune di Cornaredo is an elite women's professional one-day road bicycle race held in Italy and is currently rated by the UCI as a 1.2 race.

== Past winners ==
Year	Country	Rider	Team
2008	Austria	Andrea Graus	
2010	Lithuania	Rasa Leleivyte	
2011	Lithuania	Rasa Leleivyte	
2012	Netherlands	Iris Slappendel	
2014	United States	Shelley Olds	
