= Grand Prix de Dottignies =

Belgian one-day road cycling race

Race details
- Date: April
- Region: Belgium
- Discipline: Road
- Web site: club.quomodo.com/veloclubdottignies/accueil.html

History
- First edition: 2002
- Editions: 17 (as of 2018)
- First winner: Alessandra Cappellotto (ITA)
- Most wins: Giorgia Bronzini (ITA) (3 wins)
- Most recent: Marta Bastianelli (ITA)

The Grand Prix de Dottignies is an elite women's professional one-day road bicycle race held in Belgium and is currently rated by the UCI as a 1.2 race.

== Past winners ==
Year	Country	Rider	Team
2002	Italy	Alessandra Cappellotto	
2003	Netherlands	Baukje Doedee	
2004	Russia	Olga Slyusareva	
2005	Great Britain	Nicole Cooke	
2006	Australia	Oenone Wood	
2007	Italy	Giorgia Bronzini	
2008	Netherlands	Marianne Vos	DSB Bank Ladies Cycling-Team
2009	Germany	Sarah Düster	Cervélo TestTeam
2010	Netherlands	Kirsten Wild	Cervélo TestTeam
2011	Sweden	Emma Johansson	Hitec Products UCK
2012	Italy	Monia Baccaille	MCipollini–Giambenini–Gauss
2013	Netherlands	Vera Koedooder	Sengers Ladies Cycling Team
2014	Italy	Giorgia Bronzini	Wiggle–Honda
2015	France	Roxane Fournier	Poitou-Charentes.Futuroscope.86
2016	Italy	Giorgia Bronzini	Wiggle High5
2017	Belgium	Jolien D'Hoore	Wiggle High5
2018	Italy	Marta Bastianelli	Alé–Cipollini
