= Erondegemse Pijl =

Defunct Belgian women's road bicycle race

Erondegemse Pijl (Erpe-Mere)
Race details
- Date: August
- Region: Belgium
- Local name(s): Erondegemse Pijl
- Discipline: Road
- Competition: National (1995–2010); UCI 1.2 (2011–2019); part of Lotto Cycling Cup (selected years)
- Type: One-day race
- Organiser: Wielerclub Velo-Plus

History
- First edition: 1995
- Editions: 25
- Final edition: 2019

The Erondegemse Pijl (also known as Erpe–Mere) was a women's professional one-day road bicycle race held annually in and around Erondegem, in the municipality of Erpe-Mere, East Flanders, Belgium. First contested in 1995, it joined the UCI calendar as a 1.2 event in 2011 and in several seasons formed part of the Lotto Cycling Cup. The 26th running, scheduled for 1 August 2020, was cancelled amid the COVID-19 pandemic, and the race has not returned to the international calendar.

== History ==
The event was organised by Wielerclub Velo-Plus and traditionally started near the Steenberg administrative centre in Erpe-Mere before finishing in Erondegem. The 2018 edition was billed locally as the 24th running; the 2019 race was staged as the 25th edition. In its UCI era (2011–2019) the race carried a 1.2 classification; official UCI results are archived for recent editions.

== Past winners ==
Year	Country	Rider	Team
2011	Netherlands	Chantal Blaak	AA Drink Cycling Team
2012	Netherlands	Adrie Visser	Skil 1t4i
2013	Belgium	Maaike Polspoel	Sengers Ladies Cycling Team
2014	Belgium	Ann-Sophie Duyck	Autoglas Wetteren Cycling Team
2015	Netherlands	Thalita De Jong	Rabobank–Liv Giant
2016	Netherlands	Lucinda Brand	Rabobank–Liv Giant
2017	Netherlands	Julia Soek	Team Sunweb
2018	Netherlands	Nina Kessler	Hitec Products
2019	Netherlands	Monique van de Ree	BTC City Ljubljana
