= Sengers Ladies Cycling Team =

Belgian cycling team

Team information
- UCI code: SLT
- Registered: Belgium
- Founded: 2012
- Disbanded: 2013
- Discipline: Road
- Status: UCI Women's Team
- Bicycles: N°7even
- Website: Team home page

Team name history
- 2012–2013: Sengers Ladies Cycling Team

Sengers Ladies Cycling Team (UCI Code: SLT) was a women's professional cycling team based in Belgium. Riders for Sengers Ladies Cycling Team competed in the UCI Women's Road World Cup and other elite women's events throughout the world.

== History ==
=== 2012 ===
The 2012 women's road cycling season was the first for the Sengers Ladies Cycling Team. </ref> https://firstcycling.com/m//team.php?l=16347&k=2

== Team roster ==
=== 2013 ===
Ages as of 1 January 2013.

Rider	Date of birth
Evelyn Arys (BEL)	2 July 1990 (age 36)
Sanne Bamelis (BEL)	24 February 1991 (age 35)
Kimberly Buyl (BEL)	11 September 1988 (age 37)
Sofie De Vuyst (BEL)	2 April 1987 (age 39)
Joanne Hogan (AUS)	9 June 1982 (age 44)
Gabriele Jankute (LTU)	18 December 1993 (age 32)
Vera Koedooder (NED)	31 October 1983 (age 42)
Veronika Anna Kormos (HUN)	17 August 1992 (age 34)

Rider	Date of birth
Birgit Lavrijssen (NED)	16 January 1991 (age 35)
Christine Majerus (LUX)	25 February 1987 (age 39)
Maaike Polspoel (BEL)	28 March 1989 (age 37)
Inge Roggeman (BEL)	13 April 1981 (age 45)
Geerike Schreurs (NED)	19 May 1989 (age 37)
Julia Soek (NED)	12 December 1990 (age 35)
Anna van der Breggen (NED)	18 April 1990 (age 36)
Karen Verhestraeten (BEL)	23 April 1991 (age 35)

=== 2012 ===
Ages as of 1 January 2012.

Rider	Date of birth
Anna van der Breggen (NED)	18 April 1990 (aged 22)
Kimberly Buyl (BEL)	11 September 1988 (aged 24)
Sofie De Nys (BEL)	3 November 1985 (aged 27)
Eline De Roover (BEL)	4 April 1992 (aged 20)
Eveline Dergent (BEL)	22 June 1992 (aged 20)
Claudia Koster (NED)	22 March 1992 (aged 20)
Birgit Lavrijssen (NED)	16 January 1991 (aged 21)
Sofie Leemans (BEL)	27 January 1992 (aged 20)

Rider	Date of birth
Anouk Rockx (NED)	2 January 1992 (aged 20)
Inge Roggeman (BEL)	13 April 1981 (aged 31)
Geerike Schreurs (NED)	19 May 1989 (aged 23)
Emma Silversides (GBR)	2 October 1978 (aged 34)
Céline Van Severen (BEL)	17 September 1993 (aged 19)
Cindy Vandermeulen (BEL)	15 December 1980 (aged 32)
Karen Verhestraeten (BEL)	23 April 1991 (aged 21)
Vera Koedooder (NED)	31 October 1983 (aged 29)

== Major results ==
2012
Dutch National Record, Olympic Games: London, Team pursuit: 3:20.013, Vera Koedooder (with Ellen van Dijk and Kirsten Wild)
Overall Tour de Bretagne Féminin, Anna van der Breggen

Stages 1, 2 (ITT) & 4, Anna van der Breggen

Stage 2 (ITT) Tour Féminin en Limousin, Anna van der Breggen
2013
Grand Prix de Dottignies, Vera Koedooder
EPZ Omloop van Borsele, Vera Koedooder
Luxembourg National Time Trial championships, Christine Majerus
Luxembourg National Road Race championships, Christine Majerus
Stage 2 (ITT) Tour de Bretagne Féminin, Vera Koedooder
Sparkassen Giro, Christine Majerus
Erondegemse Pijl (Erpe-Mere), Maaike Polspoel
Mountains classification Lotto–Belisol Belgium Tour, Sofie De Vuyst

Belgian rider classification, Sofie De Vuyst
