= List of wins by Team T-Mobile (women's team) and its successors =

This is a comprehensive list of victories of the Velocio–SRAM Pro Cycling cycling team. The races are categorized according to the rules.

== 2003 ==
Tour du Grand Montréal, Amber Neben
Stage 2 Gracia–Orlová, Amber Neben
Stage 7 International Thüringen Rundfahrt der Frauen, Kimberly Bruckner Baldwin

== 2004 ==
Stage 2 & 6 Tour de l'Aude Cycliste Féminin, Deidre Demet-Barry
Sparkassen Giro Bochum, Deidre Demet-Barry
Giro della Toscana Femminile – Memorial Michela Fanini, Deidre Demet-Barry

== 2005 ==
Sea Otter Classic, Kristin Armstrong
Liberty Classic, Ina-Yoko Teutenberg
Stage 4a BrainWash Ladies Tour, Ina-Yoko Teutenberg
Lowland International Rotterdam Tour, Ina-Yoko Teutenberg

== 2006 ==
Stage 4 Geelong Tour, Ina-Yoko Teutenberg
Overall Geelong – Women's World Cup, Ina-Yoko Teutenberg

Stage 1, Ina-Yoko Teutenberg

Stage 2 & 3 Tour of New Zealand, Ina-Yoko Teutenberg
Stage 1 Novilon Eurocup Ronde van Drenthe, Ina-Yoko Teutenberg
Overall Gracia–Orlová, Judith Arndt

Stages 1, 2 & 4, Judith Arndt

Stage 5 & 10 Tour de l'Aude Cycliste Féminin, Ina-Yoko Teutenberg
La Coupe du Monde Cycliste Féminine de Montréal, Judith Arndt
Stage 4 Tour du Grand Montréal, Judith Arndt
Stage 4 Tour de Feminin – Krasna Lipa, Ina-Yoko Teutenberg
Stage 2 & 3 BrainWash Ladies Tour, Ina-Yoko Teutenberg
Stage 6 BrainWash Ladies Tour, Judith Arndt
Lowland International Rotterdam Tour, Ina-Yoko Teutenberg
Stage 3b Giro della Toscana Femminile – Memorial Michela Fanini, Ina-Yoko Teutenberg

== 2007 ==
Stage 2 & 3 Geelong Tour, Ina-Yoko Teutenberg
Overall Tour of New Zealand, Judith Arndt

Stages 1 & 6 Tour of New Zealand, Ina-Yoko Teutenberg
Stages 2 & 3 Tour of New Zealand, Oenone Wood
Stage 4 Tour of New Zealand, Judith Arndt

Overall Gracia–Orlová, Judith Arndt

Stages 2 & 3, Judith Arndt

Stage 6 Tour de l'Aude Cycliste Féminin, Linda Villumsen
Stage 8a Tour de l'Aude Cycliste Féminin, Judith Arndt
Stage 9 Tour de l'Aude Cycliste Féminin, Ina-Yoko Teutenberg
Overall Tour du Grand Montréal, Oenone Wood

Stage 3, Judith Arndt
Stage 4 & 5 Oenone Wood

Omloop Door Middag-Humsterland WE, Suzanne de Goede
Liberty Classic, Ina-Yoko Teutenberg
Stage 3 Rabobank Ster Zeeuwsche Eilanden, Ina-Yoko Teutenberg
Stages 4 & 7 Giro d'Italia Femminile, Ina-Yoko Teutenberg
Stage 6 Giro d'Italia Femminile, Judith Arndt
Overall International Thüringen Rundfahrt der Frauen, Judith Arndt

Stage 4 Judith Arndt

Open de Suède Vårgårda, Chantal Beltman
Stages 4 & 5 Trophée d'Or Féminin, Ina-Yoko Teutenberg
Stage 2 BrainWash Ladies Tour, Judith Arndt
Stage 5 Giro della Toscana Femminile – Memorial Michela Fanini, Judith Arndt

== 2008 ==
Stage 2 Geelong Tour, Oenone Wood
Stage 3 Geelong Tour, Ina-Yoko Teutenberg
Stages 2 & 4 Tour of New Zealand, Oenone Wood
Stage 6 Tour of New Zealand, Ina-Yoko Teutenberg
Ronde van Vlaanderen, Judith Arndt
Drentse 8 van Dwingeloo, Ina-Yoko Teutenberg
Ronde van Drenthe, Chantal Beltman
Stages 5 & 8 Tour de l'Aude Cycliste Féminin, Ina-Yoko Teutenberg
Stage 9 Tour de l'Aude Cycliste Féminin, Judith Arndt
La Coupe du Monde Cycliste Féminine de Montréal, Judith Arndt
Overall Tour du Grand Montréal, Judith Arndt

Stages 2, 3 & 5, Judith Arndt

Liberty Classic, Chantal Beltman
Overall Rabobank Ster Zeeuwsche Eilanden, Ina-Yoko Teutenberg

Stages 2 & 3, Ina-Yoko Teutenberg

Stages 1, 2, 3 & 8 Giro d'Italia Femminile, Ina-Yoko Teutenberg
Stage 1 Tour de Feminin – Krasna Lipa, Mara Abbott
Overall International Thüringen Rundfahrt der Frauen, Judith Arndt
Overall Route de France Féminine, Luise Keller

Prologue & Stages 1 & 5, Ina-Yoko Teutenberg
Stages 3 & 6, Luise Keller

Stages 1, 4 & 6 BrainWash Ladies Tour, Ina-Yoko Teutenberg
Stage 3 BrainWash Ladies Tour, Anke Wichmann
Rund um die Nürnberger Altstadt – WE, Judith Arndt
Overall Giro della Toscana Int. Femminile – Memorial Michela Fanini, Judith Arndt

Stages 2b & 4, Ina-Yoko Teutenberg
Stage 3, Mara Abbott
Stage 5, Judith Arndt

Merco Credit Union Cycling Classic Downtown Grand Prix, Emilia Fahlin

== 2009 ==
Young rider Classification Ladies Tour of Qatar, Ellen van Dijk
Tour of Wellington, Chloe Hosking
Tour of Flanders for Women, Ina-Yoko Teutenberg
Drentse 8 van Dwingeloo, Ina-Yoko Teutenberg
Ronde van Gelderland, Ina-Yoko Teutenberg
Overall Tour of Chongming Island, Chloe Hosking

Stages 1 & 3, Chloe Hosking

Stage 4 Gracia–Orlová, Ina-Yoko Teutenberg
Prologue Tour de l'Aude Cycliste Féminin, Linda Villumsen
Stages 1, 3 & 9 Tour de l'Aude Cycliste Féminin, Ina-Yoko Teutenberg
Liberty Classic, Ina-Yoko Teutenberg
Overall Iurreta-Emakumeen, Judith Arndt

Stages 1, 3a & 4, Judith Arndt

Overall Rabobank Ster Zeeuwsche Eilanden, Ina-Yoko Teutenberg

Stage 1, Linda Villumsen

Stage 3 Giro d'Italia Femminile, Mara Abbott
Stage 4 Giro d'Italia Femminile, Ina-Yoko Teutenberg
Stage 6 Giro d'Italia Femminile, Judith Arndt
Overall International Thüringen Rundfahrt der Frauen, Linda Villumsen

Stage 3, Linda Villumsen

Overall Route de France Féminine, Kimberly Anderson

Stages 1 & 3, Ina-Yoko Teutenberg

Profronde van Almelo, Chantal Beltman
Stage 2 BrainWash Ladies Tour, Ellen van Dijk
Stage 5 BrainWash Ladies Tour, Ina-Yoko Teutenberg
Stage 5 Giro della Toscana Femminile – Memorial Michela Fanini, Ina-Yoko Teutenberg

== 2010 ==
Drentse 8 van Dwingeloo, Ina-Yoko Teutenberg
Overall Tour of Chongming Island, Ina-Yoko Teutenberg

Stages 1 & 3, Ina-Yoko Teutenberg

Tour of Chongming Island World Cup, Ina-Yoko Teutenberg
Stages 3, 6 & 9, Tour de l'Aude Cycliste Féminin Ina-Yoko Teutenberg
Liberty Classic, Ina-Yoko Teutenberg
Iurreta-Emakumeen, Judith Arndt
Chrono de Gatineau WE, Evelyn Stevens
Stage 2 Giro del Trentino Alto Adige – Südtirol, Ina-Yoko Teutenberg
Stages 1, 2, 3 & 4 Giro d'Italia Femminile, Ina-Yoko Teutenberg
Stage 7 Giro d'Italia Femminilem, Evelyn Stevens
Stage 3 International Thüringen Rundfahrt der Frauen, Adrie Visser
Sparkassen Giro Bochum, Ellen van Dijk
Stage 2 Route de France Féminine, Ina-Yoko Teutenberg
Stage 5 Route de France Féminine, Judith Arndt
Classica Citta di Padova, Noemi Cantele
Stage 1 BrainWash Ladies Tour, Ina-Yoko Teutenberg
Stage 6 BrainWash Ladies Tour, Ellen van Dijk
Overall Giro della Toscana Int. Femminile – Memorial Michela Fanini, Judith Arndt

Stage 2, Noemi Cantele

== 2011 ==
Overall Ladies Tour of Qatar, Ellen van Dijk

Young rider Classification Ladies, Ellen van Dijk
Points classification Ladies, Ellen van Dijk
Stage 2, Ellen van Dijk

Overall Tour of New Zealand, Judith Arndt

Stages 1 & 2, Judith Arndt
Stage 3, Ina-Yoko Teutenberg

Overall Energiewacht Tour, Adrie Visser

Stage 2, Ina-Yoko Teutenberg
Stage 3, Adrie Visser

Ronde van Gelderland, Ina-Yoko Teutenberg
GP Stad Roeselare, Amber Neben
Overall Tour of Chongming Island, Ina-Yoko Teutenberg

Stage 2, Ina-Yoko Teutenberg
Stage 3, Chloe Hosking

Tour of Chongming Island World Cup, Ina-Yoko Teutenberg
Overall Giro del Trentino Alto Adige – Südtirol, Judith Arndt

Stage 1, Ina-Yoko Teutenberg
Stage 2, Judith Arndt

Stages 4 & 10 Giro d'Italia Femminile, Ina-Yoko Teutenberg
Stage 1 International Thüringen Rundfahrt der Frauen, Ina-Yoko Teutenberg
Stage 3 International Thüringen Rundfahrt der Frauen, Amanda Miller
Stage 5 International Thüringen Rundfahrt der Frauen, Judith Arndt
Sparkassen Giro Bochum, Adrie Visser
Stage 1 Trophée d'Or Féminin, Ina-Yoko Teutenberg
Stage 3 Trophée d'Or Féminin, Charlotte Becker
Memorial Davide Fardelli – Cronometro Individuale WE, Judith Arndt
Prologue & Stage 2, 5 & 6 Tour Cycliste Féminin International Ardèche, Emilia Fahlin
Stage 4 Tour Cycliste Féminin International Ardèche, Evelyn Stevens
Open de Suède Vårgårda TTT, Ellen van Dijk, Charlotte Becker, Amber Neben, Judith Arndt
Stage 2 Holland Ladies Tour, Ellen van Dijk
Chrono Champenois – Trophée Européen, Judith Arndt
Stages 2 & 4a Giro della Toscana Int. Femminile – Memorial Michela Fanini, Ina-Yoko Teutenberg
Stage 3 & 4b Giro della Toscana Int. Femminile – Memorial Michela Fanini, Judith Arndt
Stage 6 Giro della Toscana Int. Femminile – Memorial Michela Fanini, Charlotte Becker
Chrono des Nations, Amber Neben

== 2012 ==
Stage 2 Ladies Tour of Qatar, Trixi Worrack
Overall Tour of New Zealand, Evelyn Stevens

Stage 2 Loren Rowney

Drentse 8 van Dwingeloo, Chloe Hosking
Panamerican Championships individual TT, Amber Neben
Stages 2 & 4 Vuelta Ciclista Femenina a El Salvador, Amber Neben
Stage 4b Energiewacht Tour, Ellen van Dijk, Ina-Yoko Teutenberg
Overall Energiewacht Tour, Ina-Yoko Teutenberg

Stages 2 & 3, Ina-Yoko Teutenberg

Halle-Buizingen, Chloe Hosking
La Flèche Wallonne Féminine, Evelyn Stevens
Omloop van Borsele (road race), Ellen van Dijk
Omloop van Borsele (time trial), Ellen van Dijk
Overall Gracia–Orlová, Evelyn Stevens

Prologue & Stage 2, Ellen van Dijk
Stage 1, Evelyn Stevens
Stage 3, Trixi Worrack
Stage 4, Katie Colclough

Chrono de Gatineau, Clara Hughes
Grand Prix Cyclist de Gatineau, Ina-Yoko Teutenberg
Overall The Exergy Tour, Evelyn Stevens

Stage 2, Amber Neben
Stage 3, Ina-Yoko Teutenberg

Liberty Classic, Ina-Yoko Teutenberg
Stage 1 Iurreta-Emakumeen, Ina-Yoko Teutenberg
Stage 3 Giro d'Italia Femminile, Evelyn Stevens
Stages 1 & 2 International Thüringen Rundfahrt der Frauen, Ina-Yoko Teutenberg
Stages 3 & 4 International Thüringen Rundfahrt der Frauen, Trixi Worrack
Overall Route de France Féminine, Evelyn Stevens

Stage 4, Chloe Hosking
Stage 5, Loren Rowney
Stages 6 & 8, Evelyn Stevens

Open de Suède Vårgårda TTT, Ellen van Dijk, Trixi Worrack, Evelyn Stevens, Ina-Yoko Teutenberg, Charlotte Becker, Amber Neben
Overall Lotto–Decca Tour, Ellen van Dijk

Stage 3, Ellen van Dijk

Stages 1 & 5 BrainWash Ladies Tour, Ina-Yoko Teutenberg
Stage 2 BrainWash Ladies Tour, Ellen van Dijk, Ina-Yoko Teutenberg, Trixi Worrack, Evelyn Stevens, Amber Neben, Charlotte Becker
Chrono des Nations, Amber Neben

== 2013 ==
Le Samyn des Dames, Ellen van Dijk
Overall Energiewacht Tour, Ellen van Dijk

Stage 3a Ellen van Dijk

Omloop van Borsele ITT, Ellen van Dijk
Overall Gracia–Orlová, Ellen van Dijk

Points classification, Ellen van Dijk
Team classification
Prologue, Stages 2 & 4, Ellen van Dijk
Stage 1, Evelyn Stevens
Stage 5, Loren Rowney

Stage 4 Tour Languedoc Roussillon, Loren Rowney
Chrono Gatineau, Carmen Small
Stage 5 (ITT) Tour Languedoc Roussillon, Lisa Brennauer
Stage 6 Tour Languedoc Roussillon, Gillian Carleton
Philadelphia Cycling Classic, Evelyn Stevens
Overall Giro del Trentino Alto Adige-Südtirol, Evelyn Stevens

Stage 1b, Evelyn Stevens

Stage 8 (ITT) Giro Rosa, Ellen van Dijk
Stage 2 Thüringen Rundfahrt der Frauen, Carmen Small
Open de Suède Vårgårda TTT
Overall Lotto–Belisol Belgium Tour, Ellen van Dijk
Stage 1 (TTT)
Overall Boels Rental Ladies Tour, Ellen van Dijk

Stage 2 (TTT)

== 2014 ==
Drentse 8 van Dwingeloo, Chantal Blaak
Team classification Energiewacht Tour

Stage 3b (TTT)
Stage 5, Chantal Blaak

Ronde van Overijssel, Lisa Brennauer
Women's Tour of California circuit race, Carmen Small
GP Leende TT, Lisa Brennauer
Overall Auensteiner-Radsporttage, Lisa Brennauer

Teams classification, Lisa Brennauer
Stages 1 & 2, Lisa Brennauer

The Philadelphia Cycling Classic, Evelyn Stevens
Chrono Gatineau, Tayler Wiles
Overall North Star Grand Prix, Carmen Small

Stage 3, Carmen Small

Overall Internationale Thüringen Rundfahrt der Frauen, Evelyn Stevens

German rider classification, Lisa Brennauer
Teams classification
Active rider award Stage 2, Evelyn Stevens
Prologue & Stage 3, Lisa Brennauer
Stage 4, Evelyn Stevens

Open de Suède Vårgårda TTT
Open de Suède Vårgårda, Chantal Blaak
Overall Boels Rental Ladies Tour, Evelyn Stevens

Points classification, Lisa Brennauer
Teams classification
Stage 2 Lisa Brennauer

Stage 3 Tour Cycliste Féminin International de l'Ardèche, Loren Rowney

== 2015 ==
Overall Energiewacht Tour, Lisa Brennauer

Stage 2a, Team time trial

Dwars door de Westhoek, Élise Delzenne
Overall Gracia–Orlová, Alena Amialiusik

Stage 1, Alena Amialiusik
Stage 3 (ITT), Lisa Brennauer
Stage 4, Karol-Ann Canuel
Stage 5, Élise Delzenne

Overall Tour of California, Trixi Worrack
Winston-Salem Cycling Classic, Alena Amialiusik
European Games road race, Alena Amialiusik
Overall The Women's Tour, Lisa Brennauer

Stage 4, Lisa Brennauer

Stage 1 Giro d'Italia, Barbara Guarischi
Mountains classification Thüringen Rundfahrt der Frauen, Élise Delzenne

Stages 1 & 3 (ITT), Lisa Brennauer
Stage 7, Karol-Ann Canuel

Stage 4 La Route de France, Loren Rowney
