= 2013 in women's road cycling =

== UCI Road World Rankings ==
Top-ranked individual	Second-ranked individual	Third-ranked individual	Top-ranked team	Top-ranked nation
Emma Johansson (SWE); Orica–AIS	Marianne Vos (NED); Rabobank-Liv Giant	Ellen van Dijk (NED); Specialized–lululemon	Orica–AIS	Netherlands

== World Championships ==
The World Road Championships is set to be held in Florence, Italy.

Race	Date	Winner	Second	Third	Ref
World Championship Team Time Trial	September 22	(United States) Specialized–lululemon	(Netherlands) Rabobank-Liv Giant	(Australia) Orica–AIS	
World Championship Team Time Trial	September 22	Ellen van Dijk (NED); Lisa Brennauer (GER); Katie Colclough (GBR); Carmen Small (USA); Evelyn Stevens (USA); Trixi Worrack (GER)	Lucinda Brand (NED); Thalita de Jong (NED); Pauline Ferrand-Prévot (FRA); Roxane Knetemann (NED); Annemiek van Vleuten (NED); Marianne Vos (NED)	Annette Edmondson (AUS); Shara Gillow (AUS); Loes Gunnewijk (NED); Melissa Hoskins (AUS); Emma Johansson (SWE); Amanda Spratt (AUS)	
World Championship Time Trial	September 24	Ellen van Dijk (NED)	Linda Villumsen (NZL)	Carmen Small (USA)	
World Championship Road Race	September 28	Marianne Vos (NED)	Emma Johansson (SWE)	Rossella Ratto (ITA)	

== UCI World Cup ==
Race	Date	Winner	Second	Third
(Netherlands) Ronde van Drenthe	9 March	Marianne Vos (NED)	Ellen van Dijk (NED)	Emma Johansson (SWE)
(Italy) Trofeo Alfredo Binda-Comune di Cittiglio	25 March	Elisa Longo Borghini (ITA)	Emma Johansson (SWE)	Ellen van Dijk (NED)
(Belgium) Tour of Flanders	31 March	Marianne Vos (NED)	Ellen van Dijk (NED)	Emma Johansson (SWE)
(Belgium) La Flèche Wallonne Féminine	17 April	Marianne Vos (NED)	Elisa Longo Borghini (ITA)	Ashleigh Moolman (RSA)
(China) Tour of Chongming Island World Cup	12 May	Tetyana Ryabchenko (UKR)	Giorgia Bronzini (ITA)	Amy Pieters (NED)
(Sweden) Open de Suède Vårgårda TTT	16 August	Specialized–lululemon; Ellen van Dijk (NED); Evelyn Stevens (USA); Lisa Brennauer (GER); Trixi Worrack (GER); Carmen Small (USA) (+ 3' 46); Loren Rowney (AUS) (DNF)	Rabobank-Liv Giant; Marianne Vos (NED); Annemiek van Vleuten (NED); Thalita de Jong (NED); Lucinda Brand (NED); Pauline Ferrand-Prévot (FRA) (+ 3"); Roxane Knetemann (NED) (+ 3' 44")	Orica–AIS; Emma Johansson (SWE); Amanda Spratt (AUS); Melissa Hoskins (AUS); Shara Gillow (AUS); Loes Gunnewijk (NED) (+ 5' 56"); Jessie MacLean (AUS) (+ 5' 56")
(Sweden) Open de Suède Vårgårda	18 August	Marianne Vos (NED)	Emma Johansson (SWE)	Amy Pieters (NED)
(France) GP de Plouay	31 August	Marianne Vos (NED)	Emma Johansson (SWE)	Anna van der Breggen (NED)
Final standings		Marianne Vos (NED)	Emma Johansson (SWE)	Ellen van Dijk (NED)

== Single day races (1.1 and 1.2) ==
Race	Date	Cat	Winner	Second	Third	Ref
(Belgium) Omloop Het Nieuwsblad	February 23	1.2	Tiffany Cromwell (AUS)	Megan Guarnier (USA)	Emma Johansson (SWE)	
(Belgium) Le Samyn des Dames	February 27	1.2	Ellen van Dijk (NED)	Shelley Olds (USA)	Emma Johansson (SWE)	
(El Salvador) Grand Prix de Oriente	February 27	1.2	Noemi Cantele (ITA)	Lorena María Vargas Villamil (COL)	Clemilda Fernandes Silva (BRA)	
(Belgium) Omloop van het Hageland	March 3	1.2	Emily Collins (NZL)	Shelley Olds (USA)	Emma Johansson (SWE)	
(Netherlands) Drentse 8 van Dwingeloo	March 7	1.2	Marianne Vos (NED)	Giorgia Bronzini (ITA)	Emma Johansson (SWE)	
(El Salvador) Grand Prix GSB	March 7	1.1	Clemilda Fernandes Silva (BRA)	Alena Amialiusik (BLR)	Noemi Cantele (ITA)	
(El Salvador) Grand Prix el Salvador	March 8	1.1	Silvia Valsecchi (ITA)	Márcia Fernandes (BRA)	Martina Růžičková (CZE)	
(Italy) Classica Citta di Padova	March 16	1.1	Giorgia Bronzini (ITA)	Trixi Worrack (GER)	Marta Tafliaferro (ITA)	
(France) Cholet Pays de Loire Dames	March 17	1.2	Emma Johansson (SWE)	Audrey Cordon (FRA)	Jolien D'Hoore (BEL)	
(Belgium) Grand Prix de Dottignies	April 1	1.2	Vera Koedooder (NED)	Iris Slappendel (NED)	Sanne van Paassen (NED)	
(Netherlands) Ronde van Gelderland	April 14	1.2	Kirsten Wild (NED)	Giorgia Bronzini (ITA)	Chloe Hosking (AUS)	
(Netherlands) EPZ Omloop van Borsele (Time trial)	April 19	1.2	Ellen van Dijk (NED)	Loes Gunnewijk (NED)	Gillian Carleton (CAN)	
(Netherlands) EPZ Omloop van Borsele (Road race)	April 20	1.2	Vera Koedooder (NED)	Loes Gunnewijk (NED)	Lucinda Brand (CAN)	
(Belgium) Dwars door de Westhoek	April 21	1.1	Jolien D'Hoore (BEL)	Martine Bras (NED)	Pauline Ferrand-Prévot (FRA)	
(Belgium) Knokke-Heist – Bredene	May 4	1.2	Giorgia Bronzini (ITA)	Jolien D'Hoore (BEL)	Martina Zwick (GER)	
(Canada) Grand Prix Cycliste de Gatineau	May 18	1.1	(United States) Shelley Olds	(Canada) Joëlle Numainville	(Poland) Katarzyna Pawłowska	
(Canada) Chrono Gatineau	May 20	1.1	(United States) Carmen Small	(Canada) Joëlle Numainville	(Netherlands) Chantal Blaak	
(Netherlands) Boels Rental Hills Classic	May 24	1.2	(South Africa) Ashleigh Moolman	(Netherlands) Annemiek van Vleuten	(United Kingdom) Lizzie Armitstead	
(Netherlands) Rabobank 7-Dorpenomloop Aalburg	May 25	1.2	Marianne Vos (NED)	Liesbet De Vocht (BEL)	Emma Johansson (SWE)	
(Belgium) Gooik–Geraardsbergen–Gooik	May 26	1.2	Emma Johansson (SWE)	Maaike Polspoel (BEL)	Iris Slappendel (NED)	
(United States) Philly Cycling Classic	June 2	1.2	Evelyn Stevens (USA)	Joëlle Numainville (CAN)	Claudia Häusler (GER)	
(Russia) Grand Prix of Maykop	June 4	1.2	Natalia Boyarskaya (RUS)	Anastasia Chulkova (RUS)	Ekaterina Malomoura (RUS)	
(Spain) Durango-Durango Emakumeen Saria	June 4	1.2	Marianne Vos (NED)	Emma Johansson (SWE)	Evelyn Stevens (USA)	
(Republic of Ireland) Celtic Chrono	June 16	1.2	Event cancelled			
(Syria) Golan I	June 16	1.2	Event cancelled			
(Syria) Golan II	June 18	1.2	Event cancelled			
(Syria) Golan III	June 21	1.2	Event cancelled			
(Germany) Sparkassen Giro Bochum	July 28	1.1	Christine Majerus (LUX)	Maaike Polspoel (BEL)	Kirsten Wild (NED)	
(Belgium) Erondegemse Pijl (Erpe-Mere)	August 3	1.2	Maaike Polspoel (BEL)	Sofie De Vuyst (BEL)	Christine Majerus (LUX)	
(France) Chrono Champenois – Trophée Européen	September 15	1.1	Ellen van Dijk (NED)	Carmen Small (USA)	Shara Gillow (AUS)	
(Italy) GP Comune di Cornaredo	September 29	1.2	Event cancelled			
(France) Chrono des Nations	October 20	1.1	Hanna Solovey (UKR)	Alison Tetrick (USA)	Elisa Longo Borghini (ITA)	
(Brazil) GP Memorial Bruno Caloi	November 5	1.2	Event cancelled			

== Stage races (2.HC, 2.1 and 2.2) ==
Race	Date	Cat.	Winner	Second	Third	Ref
Ladies Tour of Qatar	January 29 – February 1	2.1	Kirsten Wild (NED)	Chloe Hosking (AUS)	Ellen van Dijk (NED)	
Vuelta Femenina a Costa Rica	February 21–24	2.2	Inga Čilvinaitė (LTU)	Addyson Albershardt (USA)	Lorena María Vargas Villamil (COL)	
Vuelta a El Salvador	February 28 – March 5	2.2	Noemi Cantele (ITA)	Alena Amialiusik (BLR)	Sérika Gulumá (COL)	
(Netherlands) Energiewacht Tour	April 3–7	2.2	Ellen van Dijk (NED)	Loes Gunnewijk (NED)	Kirsten Wild (NED)	
(Thailand) The Princess Maha Chackri Sirindhon's Cup	April 8–10	2.2	Thuy Dung Nguyen (VIE)	Ting Ying Huang (TAI)	Wilaiwan Kunlapha (THA)	
(Czech Republic) Gracia–Orlová	April 24–28	2.2	Ellen van Dijk (NED)	Evelyn Stevens (USA)	Emma Pooley (GBR)	
(Luxembourg) Festival Luxembourgeois du Cyclisme Féminin Elsy Jacobs	April 26–28	2.1	Marianne Vos (NED)	Giorgia Bronzini (ITA)	Emma Johansson (SWE)	
(China) Tour of Chongming Island	May 8–10	2.2	Annette Edmondson (AUS)	Chloe Hosking (AUS)	Lucy Garner (GBR)	
(China) Tour of Zhoushan Island	May 16–18	2.2	Giorgia Bronzini (ITA)	Elisa Longo Borghini (ITA)	Cecilie Gotaas Johnsen (NOR)	
(France) Tour Languedoc Roussillon	May 17–22	2.2	Emma Pooley (GBR)	Tatiana Antoshina (RUS)	Alena Amialiusik (BLR)	
(Spain) Emakumeen Euskal Bira	June 6–9	2.1	Emma Johansson (SWE)	Elisa Longo Borghini (ITA)	Evelyn Stevens (USA)	
(Russia) Tour of Adygeya	June 6–9	2.2	Natalia Boyarskaya (RUS)	Yevheniya Vysotska (UKR)	Anna Zavershinskaya (RUS)	
(Italy) Giro del Trentino Alto Adige-Südtirol	June 14–16	2.1	Evelyn Stevens (USA)	Tatiana Guderzo (ITA)	Tatiana Antoshina (RUS)	
(Italy) Giro d'Italia Femminile	June 30 – July 7	2.1	Mara Abbott (USA)	Tatiana Guderzo (ITA)	Claudia Häusler (GER)	
(Czech Republic) Tour de Feminin – O cenu Českého Švýcarska	July 4–7	2.2	Amy Cure (AUS)	Emma Pooley (GBR)	Martina Ritter (AUT)	
(France) Tour de Bretagne Féminin	July 10–14	2.2	Audrey Cordon (FRA)	Thalita de Jong (NED)	Svetlana Stolbova (RUS)	
(Germany) Thüringen Rundfahrt der Frauen	July 15–21	2.1	Emma Johansson (SWE)	Shara Gillow (AUS)	Lisa Brennauer (GER)	
(France) Tour Féminin en Limousin	July 18–21	2.2	Katarzyna Pawłowska (POL)	Tatiana Antoshina (RUS)	Edwige Pitel (FRA)	
La Route de France	August 3–11	2.1	Linda Villumsen (NZL)	Emma Johansson (SWE)	Evelyn Stevens (USA)	
Lotto–Belisol Belgium Tour	August 23–26	2.2	Ellen van Dijk (NED)	Lisa Brennauer (GER)	Emma Johansson (SWE)	
(France) Trophée d'Or Féminin	August 24–28	2.2	Marianne Vos (NED)	Anna van der Breggen (NED)	Lucinda Brand (NED)	
(France) Tour Cycliste Féminin International de l'Ardèche	September 2–7	2.2	Tatiana Antoshina (RUS)	Ashleigh Moolman (RSA)	Karol-Ann Canuel (CAN)	
(Netherlands) Boels Rental Ladies Tour	September 3–8	2.1	Ellen van Dijk (NED)	Annemiek van Vleuten (NED)	Lizzie Armitstead (GBR)	
(Italy) Giro Toscana Int. Femminile – Memorial Michela Fanini	September 11–15	2.HC	Claudia Häusler (GER)	Tatiana Antoshina (RUS)	Francesca Cauz (ITA)	
(Brazil) Giro Feminino de Ciclismo	November 1–3	2.2	Event cancelled			
(Brazil) Volta Feminina da República	November 8–10	2.2	Event cancelled			

== Continental Championships ==
Championships	Race	Date	Winner	Second	Third
African Championships	Road race	November 10, 2012	Ashleigh Moolman (RSA)	An-Li Pretorius (RSA)	Lise Olivier (RSA)
African Championships	Individual time trial	November 8, 2012	Ashleigh Moolman (RSA)	An-Li Pretorius (RSA)	Vera Adrian (NAM)
Asian Championships	Road race	March 16	Hsiao Mei-yu (TPE)	Liu Xiaohui (CHN)	Zhao Na (CHN)
Asian Championships	Individual time trial	March 13	Tüvshinjargalyn Enkhjargal (MGL)	Minami Uwano (JPN)	Jamie Wong (HKG)
European U23 Championships	Road race (U23)	July 21	Susanna Zorzi (ITA)	Francesca Cauz (ITA)	Hanna Solovey (UKR)
European U23 Championships	Individual time trial (U23)	July 18	Hanna Solovey (UKR)	Rossella Ratto (ITA)	Kseniya Dobrynina (RUS)
Oceania Championships	Road race	March 16	Katrin Garfoot (AUS)	Amy Bradley (AUS)	Carla Ryan (AUS)
Oceania Championships	Individual time trial	March 13	Taryn Heather (AUS)	Grace Sulzberger (AUS)	Ruth Corset (AUS)
Pan American Championships	Road race	May 4	Arlenis Sierra Cañadilla (CUB)	Marlies Mejías Garcia (CUB)	Angie González (VEN)
Pan American Championships	Individual time trial	May 2	Íngrid Drexel (MEX)	Carmen Small (USA)	Sérika Gulumá (COL)

== International Games ==
Championships	Race	Winner	Second	Third	Ref
Games of the Small States of Europe	Road race	Christine Majerus (LUX)	Nathalie Lamborelle (LUX)	Chantal Hoffmann (LUX)	
Games of the Small States of Europe	Time trial	Christine Majerus (LUX)	Daniela Veronesi (SMR)	Antri Christoforou (CYP)	
Island Games	Road race	Nicole Mitchell (BER)	Karen Bordage (BER)	Ann Bowditch (GGY)	
Island Games	Time trial	Ann Bowditch (GGY)	Susan Townsend (Jersey)	Súsanna Skylv Sørensen (FRO)	
Island Games	Road race team	Bermuda	Guernsey	Jersey	
Island Games	Time trial team	Guernsey	Jersey	Western Isles	
Island Games	Criterium	Ann Bowditch (GGY)	Karen Bordage (BER)	Kerry MacPhee (Western Isles)	
Mediterranean Games	Road race	Event cancelled			
Jeux de la Francophonie	Road race	Christel Ferrier-Bruneau (FRA)	Lex Albrecht (CAN)	Aude Biannic (FRA)	

== See also ==
- 2013 in men's road cycling
