= 2013 Ladies Tour of Qatar =

Race details
- Dates: 29 January–1 February
- Stages: 4
- Distance: 392 km (244 mi)
- Winning time: 9h 40' 08"

Results
Jersey awarded to the overall winner	Winner	Kirsten Wild (Netherlands)	(Team Argos–Shimano)
	Second	Chloe Hosking (Australia)	(Hitec Products UCK)
	Third	Ellen van Dijk (the Netherlands)	(Specialized–lululemon)
	Points	Kirsten Wild (Netherlands)	(Team Argos–Shimano)
Jersey awarded to the youth classification winner	Youth	Chloe Hosking (Australia)	(Hitec Products UCK)
	Team	Orica–AIS	

Stage 1 Stage 2 Stage 3 Stage 4

The 2013 Ladies Tour of Qatar is the 5th edition of the Ladies Tour of Qatar. It is organised by the Qatar Cycling Federation with technical and sports-related assistance from Amaury Sport Organisation (A.S.O.) under the regulations of the Union Cycliste Internationale (category 2.1). It took place from Tuesday 29 January until Friday 1 February 2013 and consisted of 4 stages, one more stage than the former editions. 15 teams of 6 riders took part.

All stages of the 2013 Ladies Tour of Qatar were live broadcast on TV station Al Jazeera.

== Teams ==
Fifteen teams competed in the 2013 Ladies Tour of Qatar. These included eleven UCI teams and four national teams. The teams participating in the race were:

UCI teams

- Be Pink (Italy)
- China Chongming-Giant (Hong Kong)
- Hitec Products UCK (Denmark)
- MCipollini–Giordana (Italy)
- Orica–AIS (Australia)
- Rabobank-Liv Giant (Netherlands)
- Team Argos–Shimano (Netherlands)
- Specialized–lululemon (United States)
- Team Tibco–To The Top (United States)
- Topsport Vlaanderen–Bioracer (Belgium)
- Wiggle–Honda (United Kingdom)

National teams

- France
- Germany
- Italy
- Netherlands

== Stages ==
=== Stage 1 ===
29 January 2013 – Museum of Islamic to Mesaieed, 97 km (60.3 mi)

The 88 riders of the 5th edition of the Ladies Tour of Qatar took off this in front of the Museum of Islamic Arts in Doha. Facing the wind, the pack remained bunched during the first half of the stage. The packed bunch covered 36.8 kilometres in the first hour. As the wind started blowing sideways on the pack, several riders failed to keep up with the pace. At km 55, twenty young ladies powered away while former World champion Giorgia Bronzini was left stranded behind. At km 65 the front group could enjoy a 27" lead. The gap started growing as the kilometres went by: 55" on the Bronzini group and 1’45" on the main pack at km 70, and then 2’ with 15 kilometres to go. At km 85, three riders managed to break away: Chloe Hosking, Gracie Elvin and Lisa Brennauer. They were soon to be caught by Liesbet De Vocht. The four escapees managed to stay put all the way to the finish line in Masaieed. Used to battling it out in bunched sprints, Hosking powered to her first stage success in Qatar, outsprinting Elvin and Brennauer to the line. The Aussie captures the overall lead and the first Golden jersey of this edition. With three stages to go, Hosking has a 6" lead over Elvin and also leads the points and best young rider standings that she had won last year.

Stage 1 result

	Rider	Team	Time
1	Chloe Hosking (AUS)	Hitec Products UCK	2h 23' 51"
2	Gracie Elvin (AUS)	Orica–AIS	s.t.
3	Lisa Brennauer (GER)	Specialized–lululemon	s.t.
4	Liesbet De Vocht (BEL)	Rabobank-Liv Giant	s.t.
5	Marta Tagliaferro (ITA)	MCipollini–Giordana	+ 10"

General Classification after Stage 1

	Rider	Team	Time
1	Chloe Hosking (AUS)	Hitec Products UCK	2h 23' 39"
2	Gracie Elvin (AUS)	Orica–AIS	+ 6"
3	Lisa Brennauer (GER)	Specialized–lululemon	+ 8"
4	Liesbet De Vocht (BEL)	Rabobank-Liv Giant	+ 12"
5	Kirsten Wild (NED)	Team Argos–Shimano	+ 19"

=== Stage 2 ===
30 January 2013 – Camel Race Track to Al Khor Corniche, 96 km (59.7 mi)

The 88 riders took off in windy conditions from the Camel Race Track just outside Doha. After just 6.5 kilometres, China's Jiang broke away and was rapidly caught by two other eager riders: Jasinska and Cordon. While the pack had to deal with a strong head wind, the gap increased from 2 minutes at km 20 to a maximum of 8’ 50" at the first intermediate sprint (km 38.5) won by Jiang. As the wind started blowing sideways on the race, nine riders powered away from the pack at km 39 including event leader Chloe Hosking, as well as former race winners Ellen van Dijk and Kirsten Wild. At km 46, the leading three could still enjoy a 4’ 40" advantage on the golden jersey group and 5’ 15" over a bunch including Giorgia Bronzini, Rochelle Gilmore and Lisa Brennauer. The second bonus sprint (km 60) was again claimed by Jiang while the favourites’ group moved closer, 1’ 30" adrift. The escapees were eventually caught at km 63. Twelve competitors continued powering to the finish, enjoying a 1’ lead with 20 kilometres to go. After Cordon and Jiang dropped out of the front group, nine ladies could start considering the stage win. One after the other, the five Orica–AIS girls tried to break away but were caught on each attack. It came down to a sprint, captured by Wild, ahead of Trixi Worrack and Ellen van Dijk. Chloe Hosking captured a fine fourth spot on the line, keeping command of the overall standings. The Australian however remains under the pressure of Elvin, 6" adrift and Wild, only 9" behind. Hosking also leads the points and best young rider standings.

Stage 2 result

	Rider	Team	Time
1	Kirsten Wild (NED)	Team Argos–Shimano	2h 38' 54"
2	Trixi Worrack (GER)	Specialized–lululemon	s.t.
3	Ellen van Dijk (NED)	Specialized–lululemon	s.t.
4	Chloe Hosking (AUS)	Hitec Products UCK	s.t.
5	Emma Johansson (SWE)	Orica–AIS	s.t.

General Classification after Stage 2

	Rider	Team	Time
1	Chloe Hosking (AUS)	Hitec Products UCK	5h 02' 33"
2	Gracie Elvin (AUS)	Orica–AIS	+ 6"
3	Kirsten Wild (NED)	Team Argos–Shimano	+ 9"
4	Trixi Worrack (GER)	Specialized–lululemon	+ 16"
5	Ellen van Dijk (NED)	Specialized–lululemon	+ 18"

=== Stage 3 ===
31 January 2013 – Al Thakhira to Madinat ash Shamal, 112.5 km (69.9 mi)

The 86 riders remaining in the race took off from the Al Thakhira harbour. It would be another day across the peninsula under the influence of strong winds. Despite several attempts, the pack remained bunched all the way to Al Zubara, north-west of Qatar. The first hour had an average speed of 48 kilometres per hour. The first bonus sprint was won by Kirsten Wild As the pack headed up north and the wind started blowing sideways, several riders failed to keep up with the pace. While a crash occurred in the peloton, a group of 18 ladies pulled away including race leader Chloe Hosking, Ellen van Dijk, Wild, Gracie Elvin, and Trixi Worrack. The front group enjoyed a 40" lead at km 83 on a group of 22 including Cromwell, Gilmour and Bronzini. With 25 kilometres to go, as the riders entered the final circuit, the first two groups bunched up together again. 8 riders gave it a go but were rapidly caught before reaching Madinat Al Shamal for the second bonus sprint won by Lisa Brennauer ahead of Chantal Blaak, who had both broken away just before crossing the line. Wild powered to third spot ahead of the pack, 5" adrift. With 10 kilometres to go, Brennauer and Blaak could still enjoy a 10" lead. Both were first caught by Fahlin and Cantele and then by the whole golden jersey group with 5 kilometres to go. Just under 40 riders moved closer to the finish line. With under 3 kilometres to go, race leader Hosking suffered a puncture. Despite being eventually given the winner's time, she could no longer hope for stage victory and extra bonus seconds. Well helped out by her Team Argos–Shimano teammates, Wild powered to a second consecutive stage win, beating Ellen van Dijk and Giorgia Bronzini.

The Dutch lady claimed her fifth victory in Qatar and took command of the overall standings, with a 3" lead over Gilmour and 16" over Elvin, while she also leads the points’ standings. Hosking remains best young rider of the event and will carry the White Pearl jersey during the 4th stage.

Stage 3 result

	Rider	Team	Time
1	Kirsten Wild (NED)	Team Argos–Shimano	2h 28' 15"
2	Ellen van Dijk (NED)	Specialized–lululemon	+ 2"
3	Giorgia Bronzini (ITA)	Wiggle–Honda	+ 2"
4	Marta Tagliaferro (ITA)	MCipollini–Giordana	+ 4"
5	Shelley Olds (USA)	Team Tibco–To The Top	+ 5"

General Classification after Stage 3

	Rider	Team	Time
1	Kirsten Wild (NED)	Team Argos–Shimano	7h 30' 43"
2	Chloe Hosking (AUS)	Hitec Products UCK	+ 3"
3	Gracie Elvin (AUS)	Orica–AIS	+ 16"
4	Ellen van Dijk (NED)	Specialized–lululemon	+ 17"
5	Trixi Worrack (GER)	Specialized–lululemon	+ 26"

=== Stage 4 ===
1 February 2013 – Sealine Beach Resort to Doha Corniche, 86.5 km (53.7 mi)

The 80 riders remaining in the race took off at 1:07 PM to the Doha Corniche where they would have to cover five laps of the traditional final circuit. Facing the wind, the pack remained bunched until the first intermediate sprint in Al Wakra (km 38.5) won by Kirsten Wild ahead of Chloe Hosking and Ellen van Dijk. Just after the sprint, nine ladies managed to break away: MacLean, Rowney, Small, Guderzo, Brand, Longo Borghini, Valsecchi, Cordon, Olds and Glaesser. Their lead grew to 1’10" at km 55 before dropping down once on the final circuit. The second bonus sprint at the 2nd crossing of the line (km 62.5) was claimed by Glaesser ahead of Cordon and Olds, while the pack remained 48" adrift. The front riders were eventually all caught with just over two laps to go. The pack remained bunched all the way to the finish where a sprint was to take place.

Like on the two previous stages, Wild powered to victory, outsprinting Lucinda Brand and Marta Tagliaferro. The Dutch rider captured her sixth success on Qatar soil and comforted her overall lead. Wild indeed wins the Ladies Tour of Qatar for the third time after 2009 and 2010 and shows that she really is the Queen of the event. In the final overall standings, she can enjoy a lead of 14" on Chloe Hosking and 29" on Ellen van Dijk.

Added to her Golden Jersey, Wild also wins the points classification's Silver Jersey while, like last year, Hosking finishes as the best young rider.

Stage 4 result

	Rider	Team	Time
1	Kirsten Wild (NED)	Team Argos–Shimano	2h 09' 38"
2	Lucinda Brand (NED)	Rabobank-Liv Giant	s.t.
3	Marta Tagliaferro (ITA)	MCipollini–Giordana	s.t.
4	Giorgia Bronzini (ITA)	Wiggle–Honda	s.t.
5	Simona Frapporti (ITA)	BePink	s.t.

General Classification after Stage 4

	Rider	Team	Time
1	Kirsten Wild (NED)	Team Argos–Shimano	9h 40' 08"
2	Chloe Hosking (AUS)	Hitec Products UCK	+ 14"
3	Ellen van Dijk (NED)	Specialized–lululemon	+ 29"
4	Gracie Elvin (AUS)	Orica–AIS	+ 29"
5	Trixi Worrack (GER)	Specialized–lululemon	+ 39"

== Classification leadership ==
Stage	Winner	General Classification	Points Classification	Young Rider Classification	Teams Classification
1	Chloe Hosking	Chloe Hosking	Chloe Hosking	Chloe Hosking	Specialized–lululemon
2	Kirsten Wild	Chloe Hosking	Chloe Hosking	Chloe Hosking	Orica–AIS
3	Kirsten Wild	Kirsten Wild	Kirsten Wild	Chloe Hosking	Orica–AIS
4	Kirsten Wild	Kirsten Wild	Kirsten Wild	Chloe Hosking	Orica–AIS
Final		Kirsten Wild	Kirsten Wild	Chloe Hosking	Orica–AIS

== Final classifications ==
=== Final General Classification ===
	Rider	Team	Time
1	Kirsten Wild (NED)	Team Argos–Shimano	9h 40' 08"
2	Chloe Hosking (AUS)	Hitec Products UCK	+ 14"
3	Ellen van Dijk (NED)	Specialized–lululemon	+ 29"
4	Gracie Elvin (AUS)	Orica–AIS	+ 29"
5	Trixi Worrack (GER)	Specialized–lululemon	+ 39"
6	Emma Johansson (SWE)	Orica–AIS	+ 42"
7	Tiffany Cromwell (AUS)	Orica–AIS	+ 44"
8	Lisa Brennauer (GER)	Specialized–lululemon	+ 2' 05"
9	Marta Tagliaferro (ITA)	MCipollini–Giordana	+ 2' 07"
10	Lauren Kitchen (AUS)	Wiggle–Honda	+ 2' 15"

=== Points Classification ===
	Rider	Team	Points
1	Kirsten Wild (NED)	Team Argos–Shimano	60
2	Chloe Hosking (AUS)	Hitec Products UCK	31
3	Ellen van Dijk (NED)	Specialized–lululemon	23
4	Marta Tagliaferro (ITA)	MCipollini–Giordana	23
5	Trixi Worrack (GER)	Specialized–lululemon	20

=== Youth Classification ===
	Rider	Team	Time
1	Chloe Hosking (AUS)	Hitec Products UCK	9h 40' 22"
2	Lauren Kitchen (AUS)	Wiggle–Honda	+ 2' 22"
3	Katie Colclough (GBR)	Specialized–lululemon	+ 2' 45"
4	Elisa Longo Borghini (ITA)	Hitec Products UCK	+ 2' 57"
5	Anna-Bianca Schnitzmeier (GER)	Wiggle–Honda	+ 3' 04"

=== Team Classification ===
	Team	Time
1	Orica–AIS	29h 02' 29"
2	Specialized–lululemon	+ 1' 32"
3	Wiggle–Honda	+ 6' 46"
4	Team Argos–Shimano	+ 7' 07"
5	MCipollini–Giordana	+ 8' 50"

== See also ==
- 2013 in women's road cycling
