= 2013 Durango-Durango Emakumeen Saria =

Race details
- Dates: 4 June 2013
- Stages: 1
- Distance: 113.1 km (70.3 mi)
- Winning time: 2h 56' 53"

Results
	Winner	Marianne Vos (NED)	(Rabobank-Liv Giant)
	Second	Emma Johansson (SWE)	(Orica–AIS)
	Third	Evelyn Stevens (USA)	(Specialized–lululemon)

The 2013 Durango-Durango Emakumeen Saria was the twelfth running of the Durango-Durango Emakumeen Saria, a women's bicycle race in Spain. It was held on 4 June over a distance of 113.1 kilometres (70.3 miles). It was rated by the UCI as a 1.2 category race.

== Results ==
	Cyclist	Team	Time
1	Marianne Vos (NED)	Rabobank-Liv Giant	2h 56' 53"
2	Emma Johansson (SWE)	Orica–AIS	s.t.
3	Evelyn Stevens (USA)	Specialized–lululemon	+ 2"
4	Elisa Longo Borghini (ITA)	Hitec Products–UCK	+ 2"
5	Ashleigh Moolman (RSA)	Lotto–Belisol Ladies	+ 21"
6	Annemiek van Vleuten (NED)	Rabobank-Liv Giant	+ 28"
7	Ellen van Dijk (NED)	Specialized–lululemon	+ 29"
8	Rossella Ratto (ITA)	Hitec Products–UCK	+ 29"
9	Alena Amialiusik (BLR)	BePink	+ 29"
10	Tiffany Cromwell (AUS)	Orica–AIS	+ 29"

s.t. = same time
