= 2013 Gracia-Orlová =

2013 Gracia–Orlová
Race details
- Dates: 24 April – 28 April
- Stages: prologue + 5 stages
- Winning time: 10h 55' 12"

Results
Jersey awarded to the overall winner	Winner	Ellen van Dijk (NED)	(Specialized–lululemon)
	Second	Evelyn Stevens (USA)	(Specialized–lululemon)
	Third	Emma Pooley (GBR)	(Bigla Cycling Team)
Jersey awarded to the points classification winner	Points	Ellen van Dijk (NED)	(Specialized–lululemon)
Jersey awarded to the mountains classification winner	Mountains	Alena Amialiusik (BLR)	(BePink)
Jersey awarded to the sprints classification winner	Sprints	Alena Amialiusik (BLR)	(BePink)
	Team	Specialized–lululemon	

The 2013 Gracia–Orlová is the 27th edition of the Gracia–Orlová, a women's cycling stage race. It is an UCI 2.2 category race and is held between 24 and 28 April 2012 in the Czech Republic. It consists of a prologue and 5 stages.

== Stages ==
=== Prologue ===
25 April 2012 – Havířov to Havířov (individual time trial), 2.2 km (1.4 mi)

The prologue started in Havířov located in the east of the Republic, only 12 km from the Polish border and less than 40 km from Slovakia at 17:00 local time. The prologue was 2.2 km (1.4 mi) and consisted of a straight kilometer followed by a few technical turns and again back the straight kilometer to the finish line. Ellen van Dijk won the prologue, just as in the 2012 Gracia–Orlová. Behind Van Dijk her Specialized–lululemon teammate Lisa Brennauer finished second Aleksandra Burchenkova finished third. With Evelyn Stevens in fourth place made that 3 Specialized–lululemon finished in the top 5.

Prologue result

	Rider	Team	Time
1	Ellen van Dijk (NED)	Specialized–lululemon	2' 41.35"
2	Lisa Brennauer (GER)	Specialized–lululemon	+ 5"
3	Aleksandra Burchenkova (RUS)	RusVelo	+ 6"
4	Evelyn Stevens (USA)	Specialized–lululemon	+ 9"
5	Maria Mishina (RUS)	RusVelo	+ 10"

General classification after the prologue

	Rider	Team	Time
1	Ellen van Dijk (NED)	Specialized–lululemon	2' 41"
2	Lisa Brennauer (GER)	Specialized–lululemon	+ 5"
3	Aleksandra Burchenkova (RUS)	RusVelo	+ 6"
4	Evelyn Stevens (USA)	Specialized–lululemon	+ 9"
5	Maria Mishina (RUS)	RusVelo	+ 10"

=== Stage 1 ===
25 April 2013 – Dětmarovice to Štramberk, 105.1 km (65.3 mi)

The first stage started in Dětmarovice with a 18.1 km (11.2 mi) travel south to Havířov. The riders swung east and encircled the lake to the south-east of the city. The course had during this section different small climbs, some steep but rising no more than 50m. At 45 km (28.0 mi) and 70 km (43.5 mi) started bigger climbs, but not that big as the mountains of stages 3 and 4. The last section after the last descent, about 20 km (12.4 mi) from the finish line, was a flatter section with hills no higher than 50m. The race ended on top of a steep climb.

Due to the fall of the main bunch in the last three kilometer zone riders on place 1–101 were credited with the same time. The fall happened before beginning of the final climb. Evelyn Stevens (Specialized–lululemon) won at the top of the climb the side-by-side sprint ahead of teammate Ellen van Dijk. Behind them Alena Amialiusik (BePink) finished third.

Stage 1 result

	Rider	Team	Time
1	Evelyn Stevens (USA)	Specialized–lululemon	2h 53' 48"
2	Ellen van Dijk (NED)	Specialized–lululemon	s.t.
3	Alena Amialiusik (BLR)	BePink	s.t.
4	Lisa Brennauer (GER)	Specialized–lululemon	s.t.
5	Aleksandra Burchenkova (RUS)	RusVelo	s.t.

General classification after stage 1

	Rider	Team	Time
1	Ellen van Dijk (NED)	Specialized–lululemon	2h 56' 23"
2	Evelyn Stevens (USA)	Specialized–lululemon	+ 5"
3	Lisa Brennauer (GER)	Specialized–lululemon	+ 11"
4	Aleksan Burchenkova (RUS)	RusVelo	+ 12"
5	Alena Amialiusik (BLR)	BePink	+ 12"

=== Stage 2 ===
26 April 2012 – Havířov to Havířov (individual time trial), 13 km (8.1 mi)

The second stage was a 13 km (8.1 mi) individual time trial which took place in the morning starting from 9:30. The riders rode from Havířov to Ostrava and back. The time trial would have been two rounds but was shortened to one. The course has some humps witch sections reaching a gradients near 6% and had a sweeping bend at the turning point.

Stage 2 result

	Rider	Team	Time
1	Ellen van Dijk (NED)	Specialized–lululemon	17' 32.29"
2	Evelyn Stevens (USA)	Specialized–lululemon	+19"
3	Tayler Wiles (USA)	Specialized–lululemon	+30"
4	Emma Pooley (GBR)	Bigla Cycling Team	+31"
5	Tatiana Antoshina (RUS)	Russia national team	+41"

General classification after stage 2

	Rider	Team	Time
1	Ellen van Dijk (NED)	Specialized–lululemon	3h 13' 55"
2	Evelyn Stevens (USA)	Specialized–lululemon	+ 24"
3	Tayler Wiles (USA)	Specialized–lululemon	+ 48"
4	Emma Pooley (GBR)	Bigla Cycling Team	+ 50"
5	Lisa Brennauer (GER)	Specialized–lululemon	+ 57"

=== Stage 3 ===
26 April 2013 – Orlová to Visalaje, 58 km (36.0 mi)

The race sets out once again from Orlová in the afternoon on the same day as stage 2. This time the race began in the north of the town and heading north briefly before turning south-east towards the same lakes as in stage 1, then turns south at Stonava and south-west at Albrechtice. It passes the lakes Těrlicko and Žermanice before progressing south via Dobra and Nošovice. The first 30 km (18.6 mi) had only a couple of small hills but from here the terrain begins to climb more steeply. At Raškovice, with 12.4 km (7.7 mi) to go, the race entered the mountains with the finish line located 800m above sea level, at the Visalaje ski resort.

Stage 3 result

	Rider	Team	Time
1	Paulina Brzeźna-Bentkowska (RUS)	Pacific Toruň	1h 43' 42"
2	Ellen van Dijk (NED)	Specialized–lululemon	s.t.
3	Fabiana Luperini (ITA)	Faren–Let's Go Finland	s.t.
4	Natalia Boyarskaya (RUS)	Russia national team	s.t.
5	Evelyn Stevens (USA)	Specialized–lululemon	s.t.

General classification after stage 3

	Rider	Team	Time
1	Ellen van Dijk (NED)	Specialized–lululemon	4h 57' 33"
2	Evelyn Stevens (USA)	Specialized–lululemon	+ 28"
3	Emma Pooley (GBR)	Bigla Cycling Team	+ 54"
4	Alena Amialiusik (BLR)	BePink	+ 1' 02"
5	Tatiana Antoshina (RUS)	Russia national team	+ 1' 03"

=== Stage 4 ===
27 April 2012 – Lichnov to Lichnov, 118.1 km (73.4 mi)

The fourth stage featured over the course of its 118.1 km (73.4 mi) four main mountains. One reaching 1000m with a 6% gradient climb of 600m over 10 km to get there, one reaching 800m with a 5.3% climb of 425m in 8 km, one to 900m with another 6% climb over 4 km before it flattens out slightly over the last kilometre to the summit and a final climb to 550m with a 12.5% section over the last kilometer to the top. Then there was another very steep, short climb to the finish line.

The race started without team RusVelo. Team manager Zabirova navigated the team to the wrong village also called Lichnov, about 70 km (43.5 mi) from Lichnov where the start took place.

Stage 4 result

	Rider	Team	Time
1	Ellen van Dijk (NED)	Specialized–lululemon	3h 17' 48"
2	Evelyn Stevens (USA)	Specialized–lululemon	s.t.
3	Paulina Brzeźna-Bentkowska (RUS)	Pacific Toruň	s.t.
4	Natalia Boyarskaya (RUS)	Russia national team	s.t.
5	Tatiana Antoshina (RUS)	Russia national team	s.t.

General classification after stage 4

	Rider	Team	Time
1	Ellen van Dijk (NED)	Specialized–lululemon	8h 15' 11"
2	Evelyn Stevens (USA)	Specialized–lululemon	+ 32"
3	Emma Pooley (GBR)	Bigla Cycling Team	+ 1:04"
4	Alena Amialiusik (BLR)	BePink	+ 1' 13"
5	Tatiana Antoshina (RUS)	Russia national team	+ 1' 19"

=== Stage 5 ===
28 April 2012 – Orlová to Orlová, 100.2 km (62.3 mi)

The stage 5 route, winding through Orlová, was a 16.7 km (10.4 mi) long circuit with some very steep climbs but no higher than 270m above sea level. The circuit was completed six times, giving a total distance of 100.2 km (62.3 mi).

Stage 5 result

	Rider	Team	Time
1	Loren Rowney (AUS)	Specialized–lululemon	2h 39' 55"
2	Christel Ferrier-Bruneau (FRA)	Faren–Let's Go Finland	s.t.
3	Andrea Graus (AUT)	Bigla Cycling Team	s.t.
4	Silvia Valsecchi (ITA)	BePink	s.t.
5	Martina Růžičková (RUS)	Pasta Zara–Cogeas	+6"

General classification after stage 5

	Rider	Team	Time
1	Ellen van Dijk (NED)	Specialized–lululemon	10h 55' 12"
2	Evelyn Stevens (USA)	Specialized–lululemon	+ 46"
3	Emma Pooley (GBR)	Bigla Cycling Team	+ 1:08"
4	Tatiana Antoshina (RUS)	Russia national team	+ 1' 16"
5	Alena Amialiusik (BLR)	BePink	+ 1' 16"

== Final classifications ==
Legend
A yellow jersey	Denotes the winner of the General classification	A green jersey	Denotes the winner of the Mountains classification
A white jersey	Denotes the winner of the Points classification	A polka-dorret jersey	Denotes the winner of the Sprints classification

=== General classification ===
	Rider	Team	Time
1	Ellen van Dijk (NED)	Specialized–lululemon	10h 55' 12"
2	Evelyn Stevens (USA)	Specialized–lululemon	+ 46"
3	Emma Pooley (GBR)	Bigla Cycling Team	+ 1:08"
4	Tatiana Antoshina (RUS)	Russia national team	+ 1' 16"
5	Alena Amialiusik (BLR)	BePink	+ 1' 16"
6	Natalia Boyarskaya (RUS)	Russia national team	+ 1' 37"
7	Lisa Brennauer (GER)	Specialized–lululemon	+ 2' 10"
8	Andrea Graus (AUT)	Bigla Cycling Team	+ 2' 17"
9	Edwige Pitel (FRA)	S.C. Michela Fanini Rox	+ 2' 26"
10	Christel Ferrier-Bruneau (FRA)	Faren–Let's Go Finland	+ 2' 37"

=== Points classification ===
	Rider	Team	Points
1	Ellen van Dijk (NED)	Specialized–lululemon	82
2	Evelyn Stevens (USA)	Specialized–lululemon	66
3	Paulina Brzeźna-Bentkowska (RUS)	Pacific Toruň	59
4	Alena Amialiusik (BLR)	BePink	48
5	Christel Ferrier-Bruneau (FRA)	Faren–Let's Go Finland	38
6	Tatiana Antoshina (RUS)	Russia national team	34
7	Emma Pooley (GBR)	Bigla Cycling Team	30
8	Natalia Boyarskaya (RUS)	Russia national team	30
9	Fabiana Luperini (ITA)	Faren–Let's Go Finland	26
10	Loren Rowney (AUS)	Specialized–lululemon	25

=== Mountains classification ===
	Rider	Team	Points
1	Alena Amialiusik (BLR)	BePink	35
2	Reta Trotman (NZL)	Maxx-solar	24
3	Emma Pooley (GBR)	Bigla Cycling Team	16
4	Urša Pintar (SLO)	E.Leclerc-klub Polet	13
5	Evelyn Stevens (USA)	Specialized–lululemon	11

=== Sprints classification ===
	Rider	Team	Points
1	Alena Amialiusik (BLR)	BePink	30
2	Reta Trotman (NZL)	Maxx-solar	19
3	Urša Pintar (SLO)	E.Leclerc-klub Polet	13
4	Emma Pooley (GBR)	Bigla Cycling Team	9
5	Andrea Graus (AUT)	Bigla Cycling Team	8

=== Team classification ===
	Team	Points
1	Specialized–lululemon	32h 48' 32"
2	Russia national team	+ 3' 09"
3	Faren–Let's Go Finland	+ 5' 57"
4	Ukraine national team	+ 8' 42"
5	BePink	+ 9' 52"

== Classification leadership ==
Stage	Winner	General classification	Points classification	Mountains classification	Sprints classification	Team classification
pr	Ellen van Dijk	Ellen van Dijk	Lisa Brennauer	Aleksandra Burchenkova	Evelyn Stevens	Specialized–lululemon
1	Evelyn Stevens	Ellen van Dijk	Evelyn Stevens	Alena Amialiusik	Alena Amialiusik	Specialized–lululemon
2	Ellen van Dijk	Ellen van Dijk	Evelyn Stevens	Alena Amialiusik	Alena Amialiusik	Specialized–lululemon
3	Paulina Brzeźna-Bentkowska	Ellen van Dijk	Ellen van Dijk	Alena Amialiusik	Alena Amialiusik	Specialized–lululemon
4	Ellen van Dijk	Ellen van Dijk	Ellen van Dijk	Alena Amialiusik	Alena Amialiusik	Specialized–lululemon
5	Loren Rowney	Ellen van Dijk	Ellen van Dijk	Alena Amialiusik	Alena Amialiusik	Specialized–lululemon
Final Classification		Ellen van Dijk	Ellen van Dijk	Alena Amialiusik	Alena Amialiusik	Specialized–lululemon

== See also ==
- 2013 in women's road cycling
