= 2013 Holland Ladies Tour =

2013 Boels Rental Ladies Tour
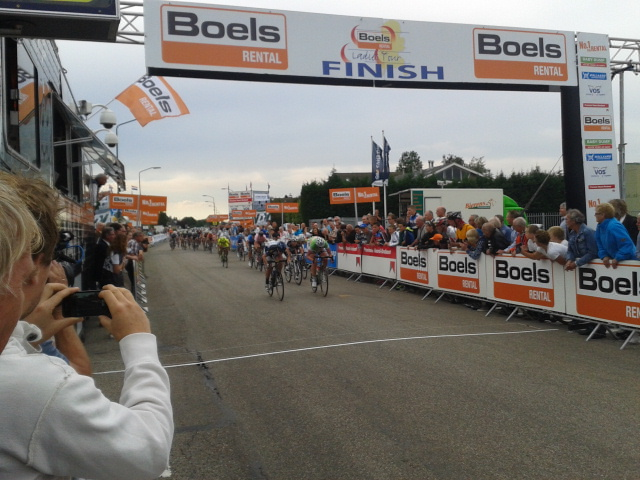
- Finish of stage 5

Race details
- Dates: 3–8 September 2013
- Stages: 6
- Distance: 612.2 km (380.4 mi)
- Winning time: 15h 00' 47"

Results
Jersey awarded to the overall winner	Winner	Ellen van Dijk (NED)	(Specialized–lululemon)
	Second	Annemiek van Vleuten (NED)	(Rabobank-Liv Giant)
	Third	Lizzie Armitstead (GBR)	(Boels–Dolmans Cycling Team)
Jersey awarded to the points classification winner	Points	Kirsten Wild (NED)	(Team Argos–Shimano)
Jersey awarded to the young rider classification winner	Young rider	Katarzyna Niewiadoma (POL)	(Rabobank-Liv Giant)
Jersey awarded to the combination classification winner	Combination	Lizzie Armitstead (GBR)	(Boels–Dolmans Cycling Team)
Jersey awarded to the sprints classification winner	Sprints	Lizzie Armitstead (GBR)	(Boels–Dolmans Cycling Team)

Promo Stage 1 Stage 2 Stage 3 Stage 4 Stage 5 Stage 6 Summary Official video's

The 2013 Boels Ladies Tour also known as the 2013 Holland Ladies Tour is the 16th edition of the Holland Ladies Tour, a women's cycle stage race in the Netherlands. The tour will be held from 3 September to 8 September, 2013. The tour has an UCI rating of 2.1.

The second stage of the tour is a team time trial and is the last team time trial of the 2013 season before the World Championships team time trial in Italy on 22 September.

== Teams ==
18 teams of 6 riders take part.

UCI teams

- Rabobank-Liv Giant
- Specialized–lululemon
- Orica–AIS
- Hitec Products UCK
- Team TIBCO–To The Top
- Sengers Ladies Cycling Team
- Team Argos–Shimano
- MCipollini–Giordana
- Boels–Dolmans Cycling Team

Other teams

- Parkhotel Valkenburg Cycling Team
- Team Futurumshop.nl
- Water, Land en Dijken
- Ronald Mc Donald huis Groningen
- Restore Cycling
- Rabo Plieger van Arckel
- People's Trust Ladies Cycling

National teams

- Italy national team
- Belgium national team

== Stages ==
=== Stage 1 ===
03-09-2013 – Roden to Roden, 109.9 km (68.3 mi)

Stage 1 result

	Rider	Team	Time
1	Kirsten Wild (NED)	Team Argos–Shimano	2h 42' 51"
2	Lizzie Armitstead (GBR)	Boels–Dolmans Cycling Team	s.t.
3	Trixi Worrack (GER)	Specialized–lululemon	s.t.
4	Annette Edmondson (AUS)	Orica–AIS	s.t.
5	Ellen van Dijk (NED)	Specialized–lululemon	s.t.

General Classification after Stage 1

	Rider	Team	Time
1	Lizzie Armitstead (GBR)	Boels–Dolmans Cycling Team	2h 42' 39"
2	Kirsten Wild (NED)	Team Argos–Shimano	+ 2"
3	Trixi Worrack (GER)	Specialized–lululemon	+ 8"
4	Marta Tagliaferro (ITA)	MCipollini–Giordana	+ 11"
5	Annette Edmondson (AUS)	Orica–AIS	+ 12"

=== Stage 2 ===
04-09-2013 – Coevorden to Coevorden, 30.2 km (18.8 mi) Team time trial (TTT)

Stage 2 result

	Team	Time
1	Specialized–lululemon; Ellen van Dijk (NED); Evelyn Stevens (USA); Lisa Brennauer (GER); Trixi Worrack (GER); Carmen Small (USA); Katie Colclough (GBR)	38' 53"
2	Orica–AIS	+ 1' 15"
3	Rabobank-Liv Giant	+ 1' 37"
4	Boels–Dolmans Cycling Team	+ 1' 57"
5	Team TIBCO–To The Top	+ 2' 18"

General Classification after Stage 2

	Rider	Team	Time
1	Trixi Worrack (GER)	Specialized–lululemon	3h 21' 32"
2	Ellen van Dijk (NED)	Specialized–lululemon	+ 4"
3	Lisa Brennauer (GER)	Specialized–lululemon	+ 10"
4	Carmen Small (USA)	Specialized–lululemon	+ 18"
5	Evelyn Stevens (USA)	Specialized–lululemon	+ 21"

=== Stage 3 ===
05-09-2013 – Leerdam to Leerdam, 122.2 km (75.9 mi)

Stage 3 result

	Rider	Team	Time
1	Kirsten Wild (NED)	Team Argos–Shimano	3h 01' 38"
2	Shelley Olds (USA)	Team TIBCO–To The Top	s.t.
3	Lizzie Armitstead (GBR)	Boels–Dolmans Cycling Team	s.t.
4	Monique van de Ree (NED)	Ronald McDonald Huis Groningen	s.t.
5	Ellen van Dijk (NED)	Specialized–lululemon	s.t.

General Classification after Stage 3

	Rider	Team	Time
1	Trixi Worrack (GER)	Specialized–lululemon	6h 23' 18"
2	Ellen van Dijk (NED)	Specialized–lululemon	+ 4"
3	Lisa Brennauer (GER)	Specialized–lululemon	+ 10"
4	Carmen Small (USA)	Specialized–lululemon	+ 18"
5	Katie Colclough (GBR)	Specialized–lululemon	+ 31"

=== Stage 4 ===
06-09-2013 – Papendrecht to Papendrecht, 116 km (72.1 mi)

Stage 4 result

	Rider	Team	Time
1	Elke Gebhardt (GER)	Team Argos–Shimano	2h 50' 00"
2	Vera Koedooder (NED)	Sengers Ladies Cycling Team	+ 3"
3	Emilie Moberg (NOR)	Hitec Products UCK	+ 21"
4	Shelley Olds (USA)	Team TIBCO–To The Top	+ 21"
5	Kirsten Wild (NED)	Team Argos–Shimano	+ 21"

General Classification after Stage 4

	Rider	Team	Time
1	Trixi Worrack (GER)	Specialized–lululemon	9h 13' 39"
2	Ellen van Dijk (NED)	Specialized–lululemon	+ 4"
3	Lisa Brennauer (GER)	Specialized–lululemon	+ 10"
4	Carmen Small (USA)	Specialized–lululemon	+ 18"
5	Katie Colclough (GBR)	Specialized–lululemon	+ 50"

=== Stage 5 ===
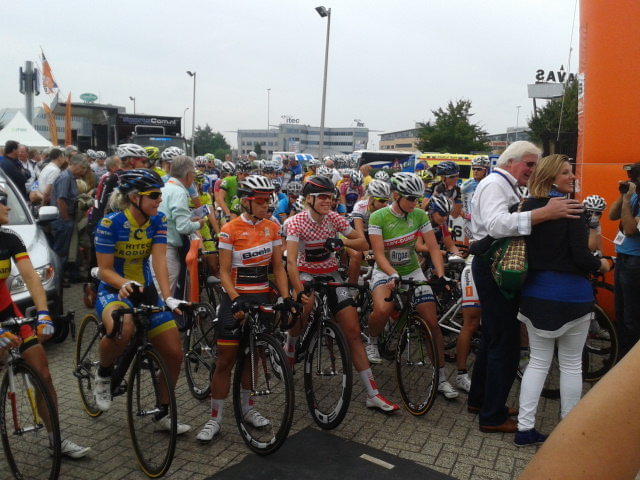
Start of stage 5: Trixi Worrack (orange jersey), Ellen van Dijk (red/white jersey) and Kirsten Wild (green jersey)

07-09-2013 – Zaltbommel to Veen, 120.2 km (74.7 mi)

Stage 5 result

	Rider	Team	Time
1	Chloe Hosking (AUS)	Hitec Products UCK	2h 52' 39"
2	Kirsten Wild (NED)	Sengers Ladies Cycling Team	s.t.
3	Shelley Olds (USA)	Team TIBCO–To The Top	s.t.
4	Lizzie Armitstead (GBR)	Boels–Dolmans Cycling Team	s.t.
5	Ellen van Dijk (NED)	Specialized–lululemon	s.t.

General Classification after Stage 5

	Rider	Team	Time
1	Trixi Worrack (GER)	Specialized–lululemon	12h 06' 18"
2	Ellen van Dijk (NED)	Specialized–lululemon	+ 4"
3	Lisa Brennauer (GER)	Specialized–lululemon	+ 10"
4	Carmen Small (USA)	Specialized–lululemon	+ 18"
5	Katie Colclough (GBR)	Specialized–lululemon	+ 50"

=== Stage 6 ===
08-09-2013 – Bunde to Berg en Terblijt, 111.7 km (69.4 mi)

Stage 6 result

	Rider	Team	Time
1	Tatiana Guderzo (ITA)	MCipollini–Giordana	+ 2h 53' 59"
2	Annemiek van Vleuten (NED)	Rabobank-Liv Giant	s.t.
3	Lizzie Armitstead (GBR)	Boels–Dolmans Cycling Team	+ 14"
4	Anna van der Breggen (NED)	Sengers Ladies Cycling Team	+ 19"
5	Claudia Häusler (GER)	Team TIBCO–To The Top	+ 19"

General Classification after Stage 6

	Rider	Team	Time
1	Ellen van Dijk (NED)	Specialized–lululemon	15h 00' 47"
2	Annemiek van Vleuten (NED)	Rabobank-Liv Giant	+ 1' 05"
3	Lizzie Armitstead (GBR)	Boels–Dolmans Cycling Team	+ 1' 11"
4	Tatiana Guderzo (ITA)	MCipollini–Giordana	+ 1' 50"
5	Claudia Häusler (GER)	Team TIBCO–To The Top	+ 2' 17"

== Classification leadership ==
Stage	Winner	General classification	Points classification	Sprint classification	Young rider classification	Combination classification
1	Kirsten Wild	Lizzie Armitstead	Kirsten Wild	Lizzie Armitstead	Annette Edmondson	Lizzie Armitstead
2	Specialized–lululemon	Trixi Worrack	Kirsten Wild	Lizzie Armitstead	Annette Edmondson	Lizzie Armitstead
3	Kirsten Wild	Trixi Worrack	Kirsten Wild	Lizzie Armitstead	Melissa Hoskins	Lizzie Armitstead
4	Elke Gebhardt	Trixi Worrack	Kirsten Wild	Lizzie Armitstead	Melissa Hoskins	Lizzie Armitstead
5	Chloe Hosking	Trixi Worrack	Kirsten Wild	Lizzie Armitstead	Melissa Hoskins	Lizzie Armitstead
6	Tatiana Guderzo	Ellen van Dijk	Kirsten Wild	Lizzie Armitstead	Katarzyna Niewiadoma	Lizzie Armitstead
Final Classification		Ellen van Dijk	Kirsten Wild	Lizzie Armitstead	Katarzyna Niewiadoma	Lizzie Armitstead

== Classification standings ==
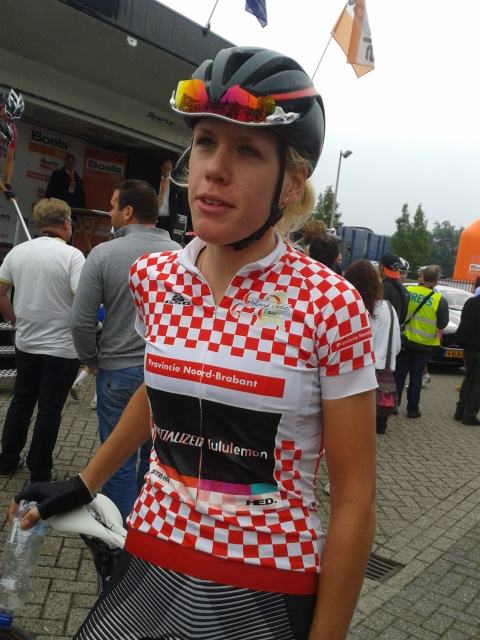
Ellen van Dijk, the winner of the General Classification, wearing the combination classification jersey before the start of stage 5.

Legend
Yellow jersey	Denotes the leader of the General classification	Green jersey	Denotes the leader of the Points classification
Mountains jersey	Denotes the leader of the Sprint classification	White jersey	Denotes the leader of the Young rider classification
White jersey	Denotes the leader of the Combination classification		

=== General Classification ===
Rank	Name	Team	Time
1	Ellen van Dijk (NED)	Specialized–lululemon	15h 00' 47"
2	Annemiek van Vleuten (NED)	Rabobank-Liv Giant	+ 1' 05"
3	Lizzie Armitstead (GBR)	Boels–Dolmans Cycling Team	+ 1' 11"
4	Tatiana Guderzo (ITA)	MCipollini–Giordana	+ 1' 50"
5	Claudia Häusler (GER)	Team TIBCO–To The Top	+ 2' 17"
6	Trixi Worrack (NED)	Specialized–lululemon	+ 2' 22"
7	Anna van der Breggen (NED)	Sengers Ladies Cycling Team	+ 2' 28"
8	Chantal Blaak (NED)	Team TIBCO–To The Top	+ 3' 21"
9	Megan Guarnier (USA)	Rabobank-Liv Giant	+ 3' 59"
10	Katarzyna Niewiadoma (POL)	Rabobank-Liv Giant	+ 4' 01"

=== Points Classification ===
Rank	Name	Team	Points
1	Kirsten Wild (NED)	Team Argos–Shimano	82
2	Lizzie Armitstead (GBR)	Boels–Dolmans Cycling Team	66
2	Shelley Olds (USA)	Team TIBCO–To The Top	59
4	Ellen van Dijk (NED)	Specialized–lululemon	52
5	Chloe Hosking (AUS)	Hitec Products UCK	39

=== Sprint Classification ===
Rank	Name	Team	Points
1	Lizzie Armitstead (GBR)	Boels–Dolmans Cycling Team	20
2	Annemiek van Vleuten (NED)	Rabobank-Liv Giant	6
2	Vera Koedooder (NED)	Sengers Ladies Cycling Team	6
4	Marta Tagliaferro (ITA)	MCipollini–Giordana	5
5	Chantal Blaak (NED)	Team TIBCO–To The Top	4

=== Young rider classification ===
Rank	Name	Team	Time
1	Katarzyna Niewiadoma (POL)	Rabobank-Liv Giant	15h 04' 48"
2	Amy Pieters (NED)	Team Argos–Shimano	+ 1' 01"
3	Susanna Zorzi (ITA)	Italy national team	+ 2' 29"
4	Melissa Hoskins (AUS)	Orica–AIS	+ 6' 03"
5	Julia Soek (NED)	Sengers Ladies Cycling Team	+ 6' 59"

=== Combination Classification ===
Rank	Name	Team	Points
1	Lizzie Armitstead (GBR)	Boels–Dolmans Cycling Team	27
2	Annemiek van Vleuten (NED)	Rabobank-Liv Giant	23
3	Ellen van Dijk (NED)	Specialized–lululemon	17
4	Tatiana Guderzo (ITA)	MCipollini–Giordana	11
5	Marta Tagliaferro (ITA)	MCipollini–Giordana	11
