= 2013 Le Samyn des Dames =

Race details
- Dates: 27 February 2013
- Stages: 1
- Distance: 119.2 km (74.07 mi)
- Winning time: 3h 10' 22"

Results
	Winner	Ellen van Dijk (Netherlands)	(Specialized–lululemon)
	Second	Shelley Olds (United States)	(Team TIBCO–To The Top)
	Third	Emma Johansson (Sweden)	(Orica–AIS)

The 2013 Le Samyn des Dames was the second running of the women's Le Samyn, a women's bicycle race in Fayt-le-Franc, Belgium. It was held on 27 February 2013 over a distance of 119 kilometres (73.9 miles) starting in Frameries and finishing in Dour. It was rated by the UCI as a 1.2 category race. The race was part of the 2013 Lotto Cycling Cup.

== Race ==
A miscommunication caused the race started while some teams were on the stage signing the startlist. The race was controlled for the most part by the teams of Tibco, Specialized–lululemon, Orica–AIS and Hitec. It stayed together until the last third of the race. With about 35 kilometres (21.7 miles) to go Ellen van Dijk attacked over a cobbled section. In the scramble to close the gap, a number of riders went down at the front of the peloton. Emma Johansson and Elisa Longo Borghini managed to avoid the carnage and chased, but van Dijk was too strong and had created a gap of over a minute. Despite hitting the pavement, Shelley Olds bridged up to the pair but the trio could scarcely close down a minute of the large gap to the leader. With a lead of more than three minutes, van Dijk rode solo over the finish line. Behind her, Olds out-sprinted Johansson for the second place, while Longo Borghini claimed fourth place. Tiffany Cromwell led home the main bunch for the fifth place.

== Results ==
	Cyclist	Team	Time
1	Ellen van Dijk (NED)	Specialized–lululemon	3h 10' 22"
2	Shelley Olds (USA)	Team TIBCO–To The Top	+ 3' 16"
3	Emma Johansson (SWE)	Orica–AIS	+ 3' 16"
4	Elisa Longo Borghini (ITA)	Hitec Products UCK	+ 3' 16"
5	Tiffany Cromwell (AUS)	Orica–AIS	+ 4' 18"
6	Anna van der Breggen (NED)	Sengers Ladies Cycling Team	+ 4' 18"
7	Adrie Visser (NED)	Dolmans-Boels Cycling Team	+ 4' 18"
8	Claudia Häusler (GER)	Team TIBCO–To The Top	+ 4' 18"
9	Sofie De Vuyst (BEL)	Sengers Ladies Cycling Team	+ 4' 18"
10	Emily Collins (NZL)	Wiggle–Honda	+ 4' 18"

== See also ==
- 2013 in women's road cycling
