= 2013 Ronde van Drenthe World Cup =

2013 UCI Women's Road World Cup, race 1 of 8

Race details
- Dates: 9 March 2013
- Stages: 1
- Distance: 132.8 km (82.5 mi)
- Winning time: 3h 42' 38"

Results
	Winner	Marianne Vos (Netherlands)	(Rabobank-Liv Giant)
	Second	Ellen van Dijk (Netherlands)	(Specialized–lululemon)
	Third	Emma Johansson (Sweden)	(Orica–AIS)

UCI Report

The 2013 Ronde van Drenthe World Cup was the 7th running of the women's Ronde van Drenthe World Cup, a women's bicycle race in the Netherlands. It was the first World Cup race of the 2013 UCI Women's Road World Cup. It was held on 9 March 2013 over a distance of 132.8 kilometres (82.5 miles), starting and finishing in Hoogeveen.

Marianne Vos rode away from the peloton on the VAM-Berg in the last lap. Later Ellen van Dijk was able to join her in her escape. A few metres before the finish line Vos outsprinted Van Dijk and won the race.

== Results ==
	Cyclist	Team	Time
1	Marianne Vos (NED)	Rabobank-Liv Giant	3h 42' 38"
2	Ellen van Dijk (NED)	Specialized–lululemon	+ 1"
3	Emma Johansson (SWE)	Orica–AIS	+ 15"
4	Chloe Hosking (AUS)	Hitec Products–UCK	+ 1' 38"
5	Kirsten Wild (NED)	Team Argos–Shimano	+ 1' 38"
6	Shelley Olds (USA)	TIBCO–To The Top	+ 1' 38"
7	Lizzie Armitstead (GBR)	Dolmans-Boels Cycling Team	+ 1' 38"
8	Marijn de Vries (NED)	Lotto–Belisol Ladies	+ 1' 38"
9	Tiffany Cromwell (AUS)	Orica–AIS	+ 1' 38"
10	Carmen Small (USA)	Specialized–lululemon	+ 2' 18"
