= Giro Feminino de Ciclismo =

Race details
- Date: November
- Region: Brazil
- Discipline: Road
- Type: Stage race

History
- First edition: 2014

The Giro Feminino de Ciclismo is a women's staged cycle race which takes place in Brazil and is currently rated by the UCI as 2.2.
