= Volta Feminina da República =

Race details
- Date: November
- Region: Brazil
- Discipline: Road
- Type: Stage race

History
- First edition: 2014
- Editions: 5 (as of 2019)
- First winner: Fernanda Silva Souza (BRA)
- Most wins: Ana Paula Polegatch (BRA) (4 wins)
- Most recent: Ana Paula Polegatch (BRA)

The Volta Feminina da República is a women's staged cycle race which takes place in Brazil and is currently rated by the UCI as 2.2.

== Winners ==
Year	Country	Rider	Team
2012	Brazil	Fernanda Silva Souza	
2013	Brazil	Ana Paula Polegatch	
2014	Brazil	Ana Paula Polegatch	
2015	Brazil	Ana Paula Polegatch	
2019	Brazil	Ana Paula Polegatch	Memorial–Santos/Fupes
