= Loren Rowney =

Australian cyclist

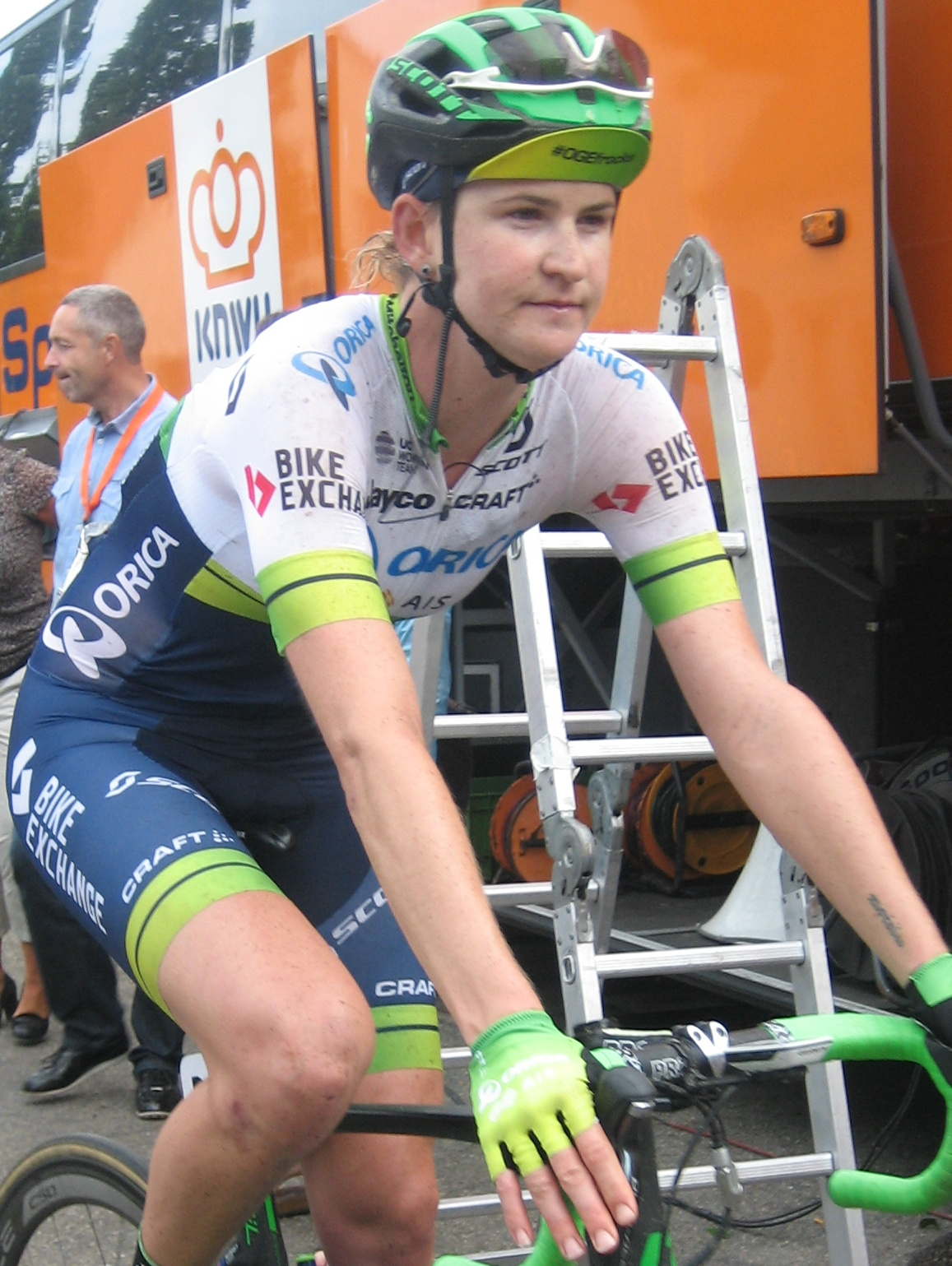
- Rowney in 2016

Personal information
- Born: 14 October 1988 (age 38) Johannesburg, South Africa

Cycling career
- Sport: Cycling
- Current team: Retired
- Discipline: Road
- Role: Rider; Directeur sportif
- Rider type: Sprinter

Professional teams
- 2012–2015: Team Specialized–lululemon
- 2016–2017: Orica–AIS

Managerial teams
- 2017: Roxsolt
- 2018: Trek–Drops

Loren Rowney (born 14 October 1988) is an Australian former racing cyclist. She rode at the 2014 UCI Road World Championships. In October 2015 it was announced that Rowney would join Orica–AIS for the 2016 season after her previous team Velocio–SRAM disbanded. After five years as a professional, Rowney announced that she was retiring from competition in January 2017 after struggling with mental health problems for the previous year.

== Major results ==
2011
1st Overall Honda Hybrid Women's Tour

1st Sprints classification
1st Young rider classification
1st Stage 2

2012
1st Stage 2 Bay Classic Series
1st Stage 2 Women's Tour of New Zealand
1st Stage 1 Redlands Bicycle Classic
1st Stage 6 La Route de France
2013
1st Stage 5 Gracia-Orlová
1st Stage 3 Tour Languedoc Roussillon
1st Stage 1 (TTT) Belgium Tour
2014
1st Stage 3 Tour Cycliste Féminin International de l'Ardèche
2015
1st Stage 4 La Route de France
1st Stage 5 Trophée d'Or Féminin
1st Mountains classification Women's Tour Down Under
7th Acht van Westerveld
2016
1st Stage 2 Tour de Feminin-O cenu Českého Švýcarska
9th Road race, Oceania Road Championships

== See also ==
- 2012 Team Specialized–lululemon season
- 2013 Specialized–lululemon season
- 2014 Specialized–lululemon season
