= 2013 Philadelphia Cycling Classic =

Race details
- Dates: 2 June 2013
- Distance: 96.5 km (59.96 mi)

Results
	Winner	Evelyn Stevens (USA)	(Velocio–SRAM Pro Cycling)
	Second	Joëlle Numainville (CAN)	(Team Optum p/b Kelly Benefit Strategies)
	Third	Claudia Häusler (GER)	(Team TIBCO)

The 2013 Philadelphia Cycling Classic was a one-day women's cycle race, held in the United States on June 2 2013. The tour has an UCI rating of 1.2. The race was won by the American Evelyn Stevens of Velocio–SRAM Pro Cycling.

Result

	Rider	Team	Time
1	Evelyn Stevens (USA)	Velocio–SRAM Pro Cycling	2h 33' 25"
2	Joëlle Numainville (CAN)	Team Optum p/b Kelly Benefit Strategies	s.t.
3	Claudia Häusler (GER)	Team TIBCO	+ 5"
4	Shelley Olds (USA)	Team TIBCO	+ 7"
5	Mara Abbott (USA)	Exergy Twenty16	+ 7"
6	Lex Albrecht (CAN)	Boels–Dolmans Cycling Team	+ 7"
7	Lauren Stephens (USA)	Team TIBCO	+ 8"
8	Véronique Fortin (CAN)	Pasta Zara–Cogeas	+ 14"
9	Jade Wilcoxson (USA)	Team Optum p/b Kelly Benefit Strategies	+ 21"
10	Mary Zider (CAN)	Boels–Dolmans Cycling Team	+ 22"
