= GP Memorial Bruno Caloi =

Race details
- Date: November
- Region: Brazil
- Discipline: Road

History
- First edition: 2014

The GP Memorial Bruno Caloi is an elite women's professional one-day road bicycle race held in Brazil and is currently rated by the UCI as a 1.2 race.
