= 2013 Specialized–lululemon season =

2013 Specialized–lululemon
- UCI Team ranking: 2nd
- Manager: Kristy Scrymgeour

Season victories
- One-day races: 13
- Stage race overall: 5
- Stage race stages: 14
- Best ranked rider: Ellen van Dijk (3rd)

The 2013 season was the eleventh for the Specialized–lululemon cycling team, which began as the T-Mobile team in 2003. Three riders joined the team in 2013, American cyclists Carmen Small and Tayler Wiles, and the Canadian Gillian Carleton. Charlotte Becker, Emilia Fahlin, Chloe Hosking, Clara Hughes and Amber Neben left the team in the post-Olympic year.

The year was marked with the crash of Ina-Yoko Teutenberg at the Drenste 8 in March. She was unable to ride for the remainder of the season and ended her career afterwards. Ellen van Dijk became the leader of the team and had a great season. She won the general classification of a stage race four times as well as several one-day races and finished four times on the podium in World Cup races. Above all she won the World Time Trial Championships. Van Dijk finished 3rd in the final World Cup standings and also 3rd in the UCI World Ranking.

Evelyn Stevens had to miss the Tour of Flanders due to a fall. She finished fifth in the Giro Rosa, third in the Route de France, with the American Team and finished behind teammates Ellen van Dijk and Carmen Small (3rd place), fourth in the time trial at the World Championships. She finished ultimately 7th in the UCI world Ranking.

The team was, as last year, undefeated in the team time trials and won the World Team Time Trial Championships in September. The team finished 3rd in the UCI World Ranking.

== Roster ==
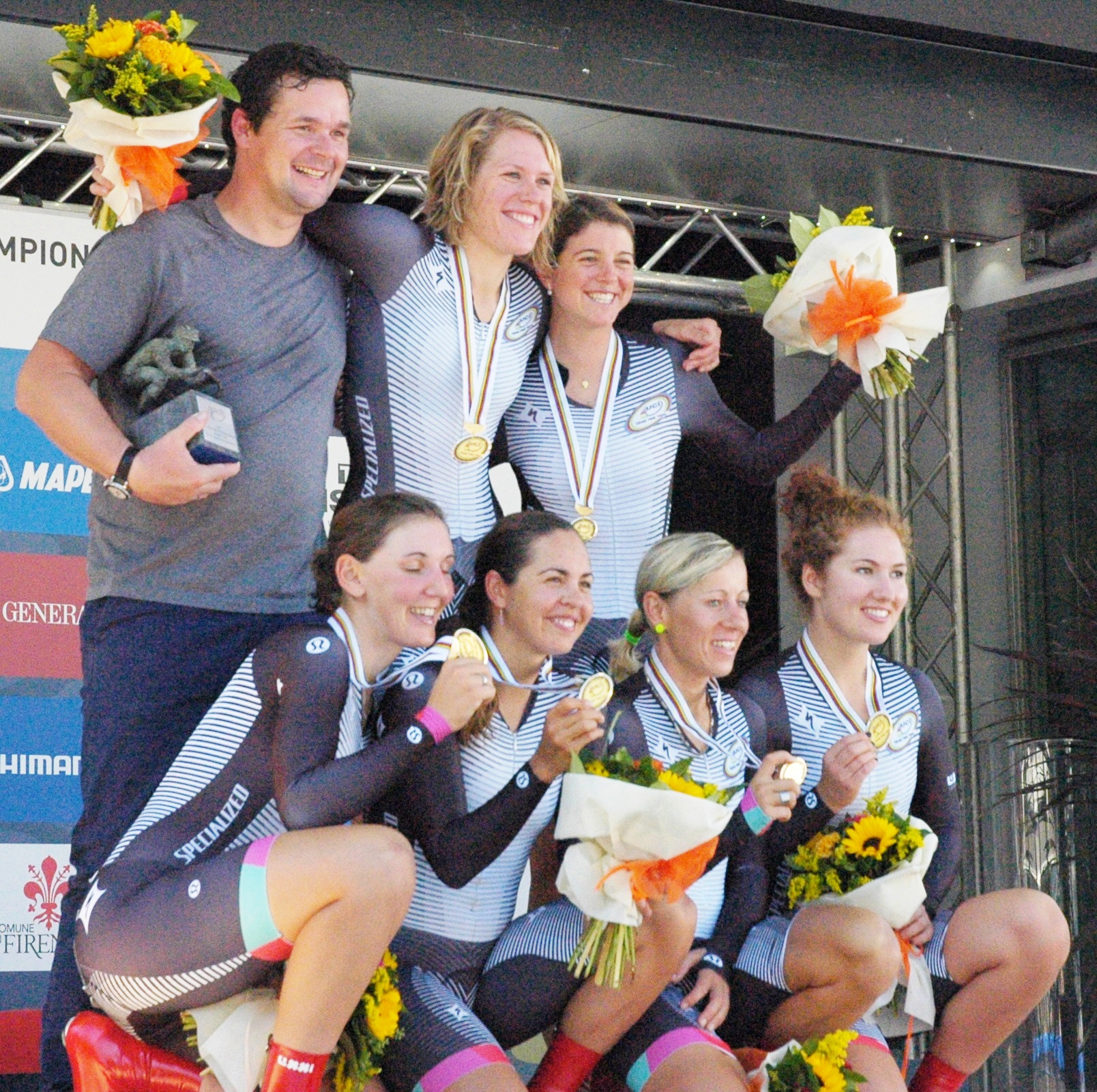
The team at the 2013 UCI Road World Championships

As of 1 January 2013. Ages as of 1 January 2013.

Rider	Date of birth
Lisa Brennauer (GER)	June 8, 1988 (aged 24)
Gillian Carleton (CAN)	December 3, 1989 (aged 23)
Katie Colclough (GBR)	January 20, 1990 (aged 22)
Ellen van Dijk (NED)	February 11, 1987 (aged 25)
Loren Rowney (AUS)	October 14, 1988 (aged 24)
Carmen Small (USA)	April 20, 1980 (aged 32)

Rider	Date of birth
Ally Stacher (USA)	June 8, 1987 (aged 25)
Evelyn Stevens (USA)	May 9, 1983 (aged 29)
Ina-Yoko Teutenberg (GER)	October 28, 1974 (aged 38)
Tayler Wiles (USA)	July 20, 1989 (aged 23)
Trixi Worrack (GER)	September 28, 1981 (aged 31)

Riders who joined the team for the 2013 season

Rider	2012 team
Gillian Carleton (CAN)	Canada national team
Carmen Small (USA)	Optum-Kelly Benefit Strategies
Tayler Wiles (USA)	Exergy-Twenty12

Riders who left the team during or after the 2012 season

Rider	2013 team
Charlotte Becker (GER)	Team Argos–Shimano
Emilia Fahlin (SWE)	Hitec Products UCK
Chloe Hosking (AUS)	Hitec Products UCK
Clara Hughes (CAN)	Retired
Amber Neben (USA)	Pasta Zara–Cogeas

== Season ==
=== January ===
In early January, Trixi Worrack won the German national cyclo-cross championships.

=== February – April: Classic races ===
February and March were two great months for Ellen van Dijk. After finishing third in the Ladies Tour of Qatar she won the first prestigious road victory of the season, Le Samyn des Samyn at the end of February. She escaped from the bunch with 35 km to go and finished three minutes ahead of the chasing group. In early March, during the Ronde van Drenthe, she went on a breakaway with Marianne Vos. Van Dijk lost the side by side sprint and finished second. In the second World Cup race the Trofeo Alfredo Binda, she finished again on the podium, this time in third place. Finally, in late March, she finished second in the Tour of Flanders behind Marianne Vos again. Vos, Emma Johansson and Elisa Longo Borghine escaped on the Karemont, but Van Dijk was able to close the gap. Finally, the four women sprinted for victory. Ellen regretted that she was not able to outsprint Vos.

In March, at the Drenste 8 Ina-Yoko Teutenberg had a serious crash. She had a concussion and was not able to start in the spring classics. She did not recover as fast as she had hoped for and decided in June not to start anymore the season because she was not able to train properly. Evelyn Stevens was not able to defend her title at the Flèche Wallonne due to a fall at the Classica Citta di Padova. She had broken teeth and numerous wounds. Ellen van Dijk finished sixth. Katie Colclough escaped in the final but was pulled back.

=== April – May: Stage races ===
Ellen van Dijk won begin April, the general classification of the Energiewacht Tour. She won the individual time trial stage over 21.1 km and finished twice second in a stages. The Gracia-Orlová was also really successful for the team at the end of April. Van Dijk won the general classification again together with the points classification, the prologue, stage 2 and stage 3. The other two stages were won by her teammates Evelyn Stevens (stage 3) and Loren Rowney (stage 5).

On 20 May, Carmen Small won Chrono Gatineau, and five days later the American time trial championship.

=== June – July: national championships and stage races ===
In June, Evelyn Stevens returned in the peloton. She won the Philadelphia Cycling Classic, and later on a stage and the final classification of the Giro del Trentino Alto Adige

At the end of the month the national championships took place and the team won three titles. Ellen van Dijk won the Dutch national time trial title, Lisa Brennauer won the German time trial title and Trixi Worrack the German road race title. Therefore, the team started the Giro Rosa with big ambitions. Evelyn Stevens, the leader of the team, was in the general classification in second place after the fourth stage, but finished tenth in the fifth stage and lost 3' 55" to Abbott. The day afterwards she finished in fifth place and lost 1' 32". On the final day Ellen van Dijk won the time trial stage. Stevens finished behind Van Dijk second and finished in fifth place overall. The Giro was won in the end by Mara Abbott.

In July, in the Thüringen Rundfahrt der Frauen, Carmen Small won the sprint of the second stage. In the fourth stage, an individual time trial, Ellen van Dijk finished second behind Shara Gillow. Lisa Brennauer finished second in the last stage and third in the general classification.

=== August: Route de France and Sweden ===
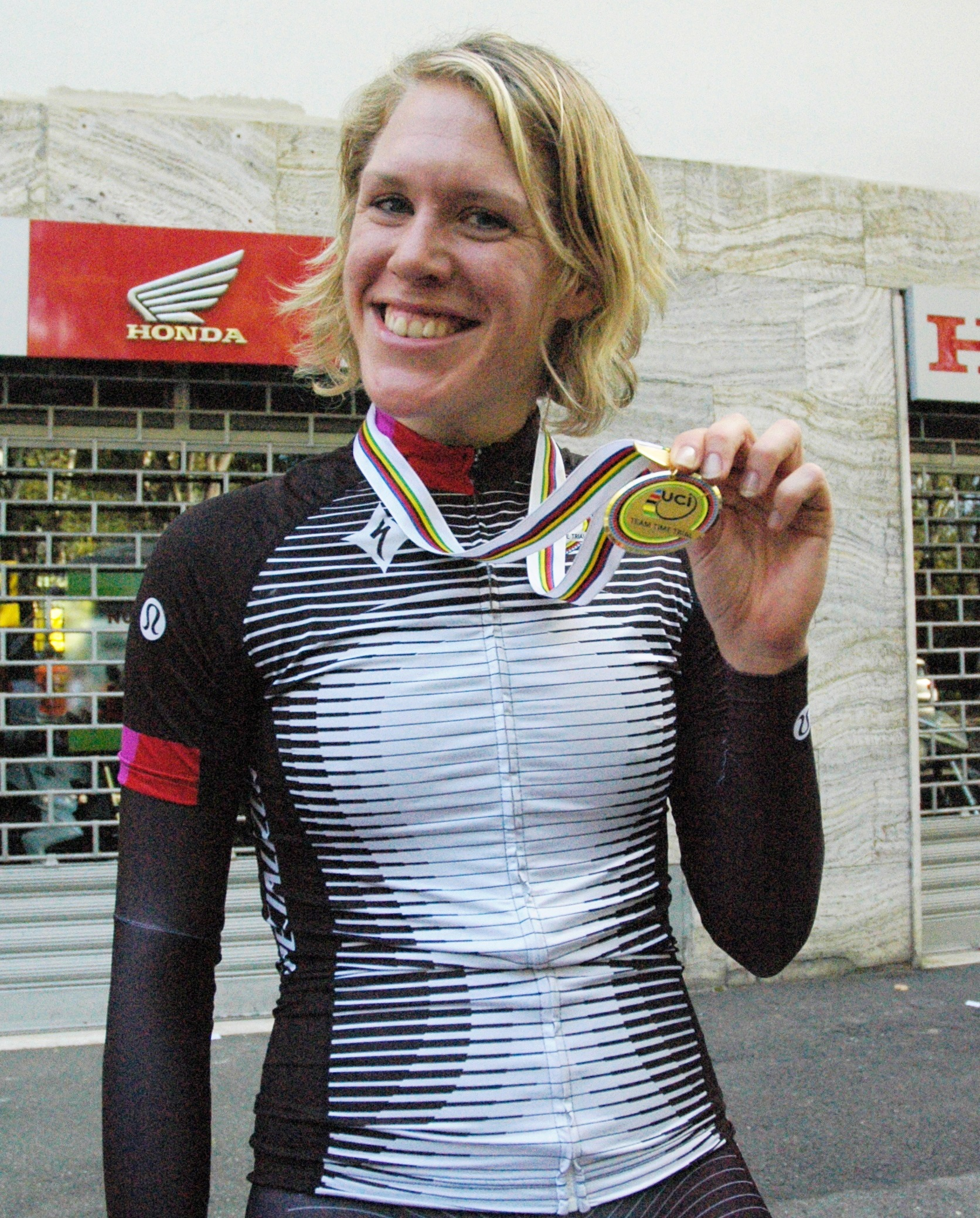
Ellen van Dijk won the time trial world championships

The second grand tour started at 3 August: La Route de France. Specialized–lululemon did not start in this race, but two riders were part of the American national team, Evelyn Stevens and Ally Stacher. Stevens finished fifth in the prologue. After six stages won by Giorgia Bronzini in the sprints, the last stage was disputed. Stevens attacked in a difficult ascent, Linda Villumsen, former rider of the team between 2007 and 2010, chased her down and extended her lead. She finished with a lead of over 5 minutes and won also the general classification. Stevens was caught by the chasing group and with the difference made in the prologue she finished in third place.

At the Open de Suède Vårgårda TTT world cup race the team showed once again its supremacy in the team time trial. In the Open de Suède Vårgårda road race, there was a front group of 10 riders with Evelyn Stevens and Ellen van Dijk. After an attack by Marianne Vos, there were only six riders left with the two from Specialized–lululemon. Stevens went all out in the final kilometres, but was pulled back. Van Dijk finished fourth after a great team effort and Stevens finished sixth.

In the Lotto–Belisol Belgium Tour the team won the inaugural team time trial. Lisa Brennauer finished second in the third stage. Ellen van Dijk finished third in the last stage uphill in Geraardsbergen and ensured her third stage race victory of the season, with Brennauer finishing in second place.

=== September: Road World Championships ===
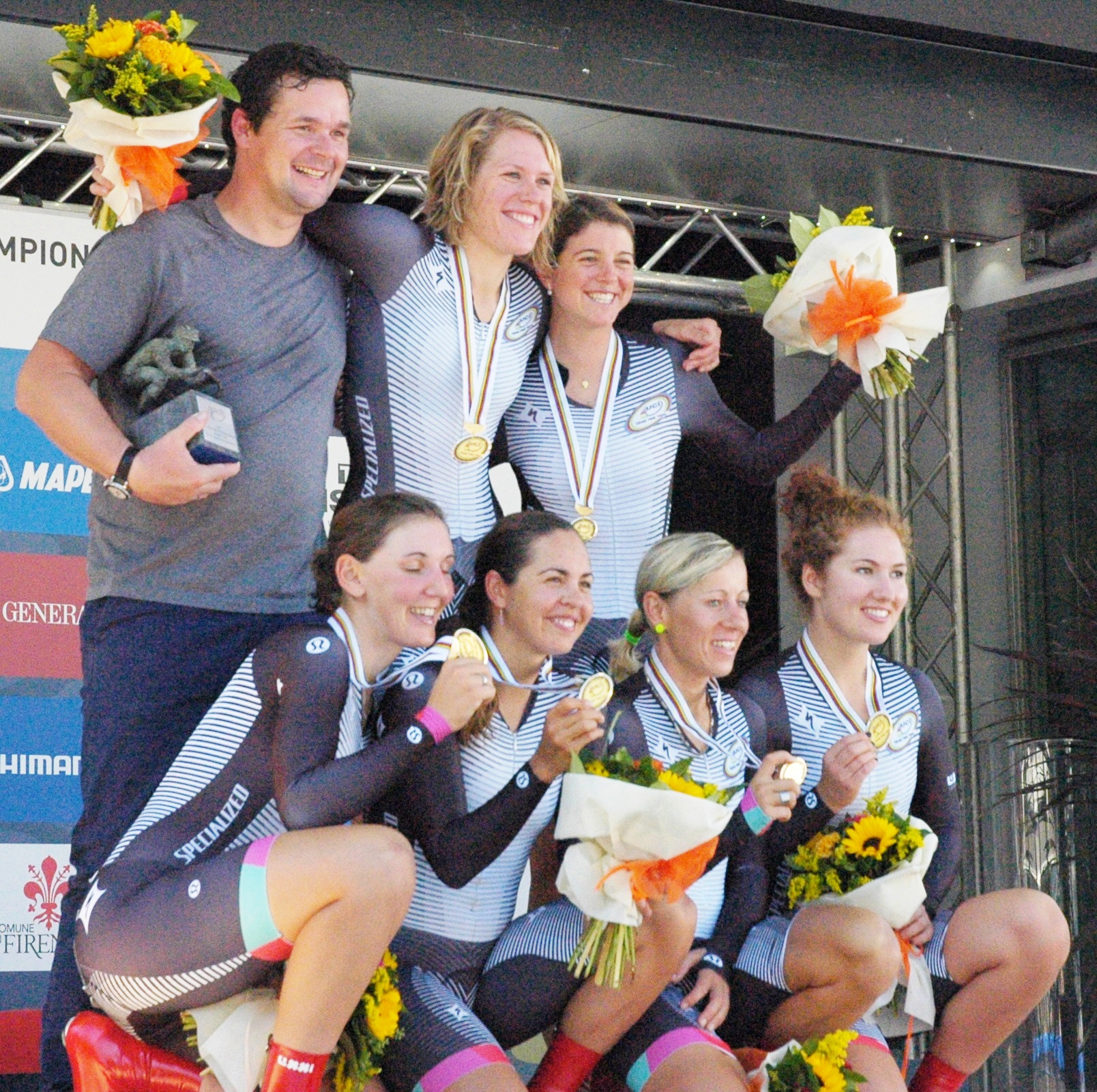
The team won at the World Championships the team time trial. From left to right: (back) Ronny Lauke, van Dijk, Stevens, (front) Brennauer, Small, Worrack and Colclough

The Boels Rental Ladies Tour took place in early September. Trixi Worrack finished third in the first stage. After the team won the team time trial of the second stage, Worrack took the overall lead and kept the leading jersey until the last stage. After a hectic last stage, it was Ellen van Dijk, who was in second place four seconds behind Worrack, who won the stage race. Worrack finished ultimately in sixth place.

The Giro della Toscana Int. Femminile, renamed this year as the "pre worlds" because of the World Championships taking place in Tuscany, did not bring notable results for the team. In the individual time trial, one of the main goals for the team this season, the team took the world title with an average speed of 51 km/h and over a minute ahead of the Rabobank-Liv Giant. The composition of the team was: Trixi Worrack, Ellen van Dijk, Evelyn Stevens, Carmen Small, Katie Colclough and Lisa Brennauer. They expressed great joy after winning. The team was, as in 2012, undefeated in the team time trial in the 2013 season.

Thereafter, the team members joined their respective national selection. In the individual time trial, Ellen van Dijk won the world title. She said upon arrival that it is a dream come true and that it is the result of a conscientious preparation with numerous reconnaissances of the course. She filmed the course to watch it over and over to know it by heart and to know the bends. In the same event, Small won the bronze medal, Steven finished fourth only 4 hundredths of a second from Small, Trixi Worrack finished fifth and Lisa Brennauer eleventh.

In the road race, Stevens was the only member of the team who was in the front group with the main favourites and finished fifth.

== Results ==
=== Season victories ===
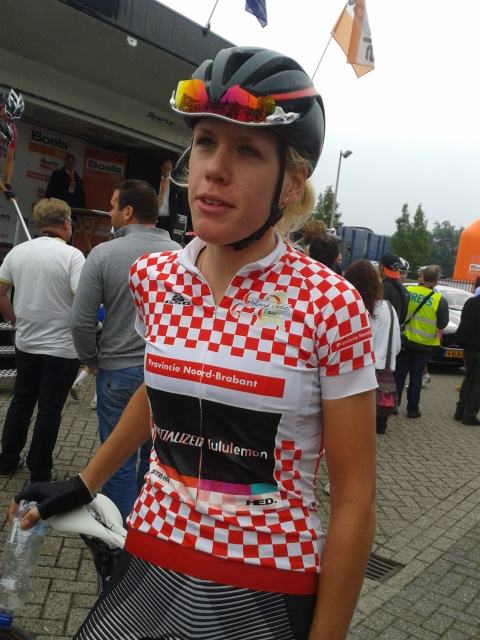
Ellen van Dijk at the Boels Rental Ladies Tour which she would win in the end

Single day and stage races 2013
Date	Country	Race	Cat.	Winner
27 February	Belgium	Le Samyn des Dames	1.2	(Netherlands) Ellen van Dijk
5 April	Netherlands	Stage 3 Energiewacht Tour	2.2	(Netherlands) Ellen van Dijk
7 April	Netherlands	General classification Energiewacht Tour	2.2	(Netherlands) Ellen van Dijk
24 April	Czech Republic	Prologue Gracia-Orlová	2.2	(Netherlands) Ellen van Dijk
25 April	Czech Republic	Stage 1 Gracia-Orlová	2.2	(United States) Evelyn Stevens
26 April	Czech Republic	Stage 2 Gracia-Orlová	2.2	(Netherlands) Ellen van Dijk
27 April	Czech Republic	Stage 4 Gracia-Orlová	2.2	(Netherlands) Ellen van Dijk
28 April	Czech Republic	Stage 5 Gracia-Orlová	2.2	(Australia) Loren Rowney
28 April	Czech Republic	Points classification Gracia-Orlová	2.2	(Netherlands) Ellen van Dijk
28 April	Czech Republic	General classification Gracia-Orlová	2.2	(Netherlands) Ellen van Dijk
20 May	France	Stage 4 Tour du Languedoc-Roussillon	2.2	(Australia) Loren Rowney
21 May	France	Stage 5 Tour du Languedoc-Roussillon	2.2	(Germany) Lisa Brennauer
22 May	France	Stage 6 Tour du Languedoc-Roussillon	2.2	(Canada) Gillian Carleton
21 May	Canada	Chrono Gatineau	1.2	(United States) Carmen Small
2 June	United States	Philadelphia Cycling Classic	1.2	(United States) Evelyn Stevens
15 June	Italy	Stage 1 Giro del Trentino Alto Adige	2.1	(United States) Evelyn Stevens
16 June	Italy	General classification Giro del Trentino Alto Adige	2.1	(United States) Evelyn Stevens
7 July	Italy	Stage 8 Giro d'Italia Femminile	2.1	(Netherlands) Ellen van Dijk
16 July	Germany	Stage 2 Thüringen Rundfahrt der Frauen	2.1	(United States) Carmen Small
16 August	Sweden	Open de Suède Vårgårda TTT	CDM	Specialized–lululemon
23 August	Belgium	Stage 1 Lotto–Belisol Belgium Tour	2.2	Specialized–lululemon
26 August	Belgium	General classification Lotto–Belisol Belgium Tour	2.2	(Netherlands) Ellen van Dijk
4 September	Netherlands	Stage 2 Boels Rental Ladies Tour	2.1	Specialized–lululemon
8 September	Netherlands	General classification Boels Rental Ladies Tour	2.1	(Netherlands) Ellen van Dijk
15 September	France	Chrono Champenois	1.1	(Netherlands) Ellen van Dijk

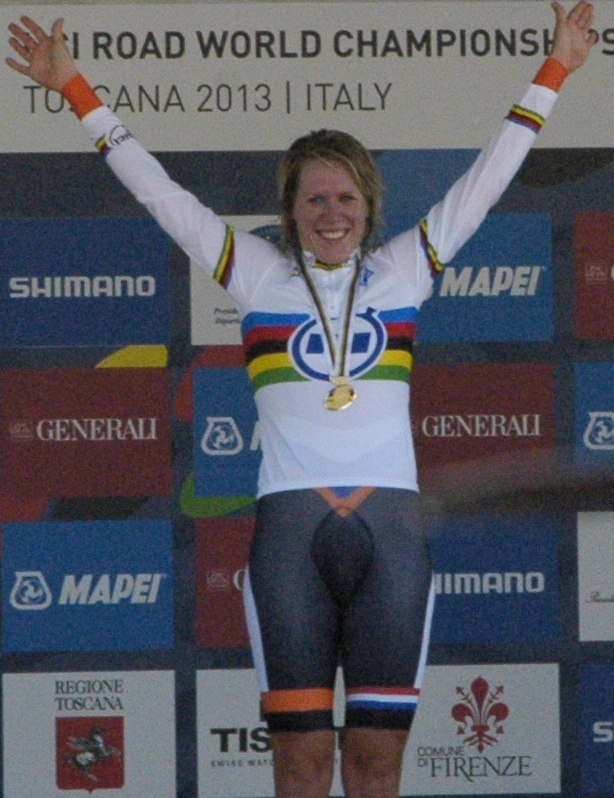
Ellen van Dijk on the podium after winning the individual time trial at the world championships

National and World champions 2013
Date	Discipline	Jersey	Winner
13 January	German national cyclo-cross champion		Trixi Worrack
25 May	United States National Road Race Championships		Carmen Small
19 June	Dutch national time trial champion		Ellen van Dijk
21 June	German national time trial champion		Lisa Brennauer
22 June	German national road race champion		Trixi Worrack
11 July	German national track champion – individual pursuit		Lisa Brennauer
22 September	Team Time Trial World Champion		Specialized–lululemon
24 September	Time Trial World Champion		(Netherlands) Ellen van Dijk

== Results in major races ==
=== Single day races ===
At the 2013 UCI Women's Road World Cup, Ellen van Dijk finished 3rd in the final classification and Evelyn Stevens 10th. The team finished 3rd in the teams standing.

Results at the 2013 World Cup races
Date	#	Race	Best rider	Place
9 March	1	Ronde van Drenthe	(Netherlands) Ellen van Dijk	2nd
24 March	2	Trofeo Alfredo Binda-Comune di Cittiglio	(Netherlands) Ellen van Dijk	3rd
31 March	3	Tour of Flanders	(Netherlands) Ellen van Dijk	2nd
17 April	4	La Flèche Wallonne Féminine	(Netherlands) Ellen van Dijk	6th
12 May	5	Tour of Chongming Island	-	-
16 August	6	Open de Suède Vårgårda TTT	Specialized–lululemon	1st
18 August	7	Open de Suède Vårgårda	(Netherlands) Ellen van Dijk	4th
31 August	8	GP de Plouay	(United States) Evelyn Stevens	20th
Final individual classification			(United States) Evelyn Stevens	4th
Final team classification			Specialized–lululemon	3rd

Results at the 2013 UCI Road World Championships
Date	Race	Best rider	Place
22 September	UCI Road World Championships – Women's team time trial	Specialized–lululemon	1st
24 September	UCI Road World Championships – Women's time trial (Note: Riders are part of the national team)	-	-
28 September	UCI Road World Championships – Women's road race (Note: Riders are part of the national team)	(United Kingdom) Lizzie Armitstead	19th

=== Grand Tours ===
Results of the team in the grand tours
Grand tour	Giro d'Italia Femminile
Rider (classification)	Evelyn Stevens (5th)
Victories	1 stage win (Ellen van Dijk)

== UCI World Ranking ==
The team finished second in the UCI ranking for teams. The teams Orica–AIS, Specialized–lululemon and Rabobank-Liv Giant finished close from each other with respectively 2138.5, 2132 and 2118.75 points.

Individual world ranking
Rank	Rider	Points
3	(Netherlands) Ellen van Dijk	924
7	(United States) Evelyn Stevens	527
21	(Germany) Lisa Brennauer	244
22	(Germany) Trixi Worrack	237
24	(United States) Carmen Small	231
148	(Australia) Loren Rowney	22
260	(Canada) Gillian Carleton	8
308	(United States) Tayler Wiles	6
428	(United Kingdom) Katie Colclough	2
