= Evelyn Stevens (cyclist) =

American racing cyclist

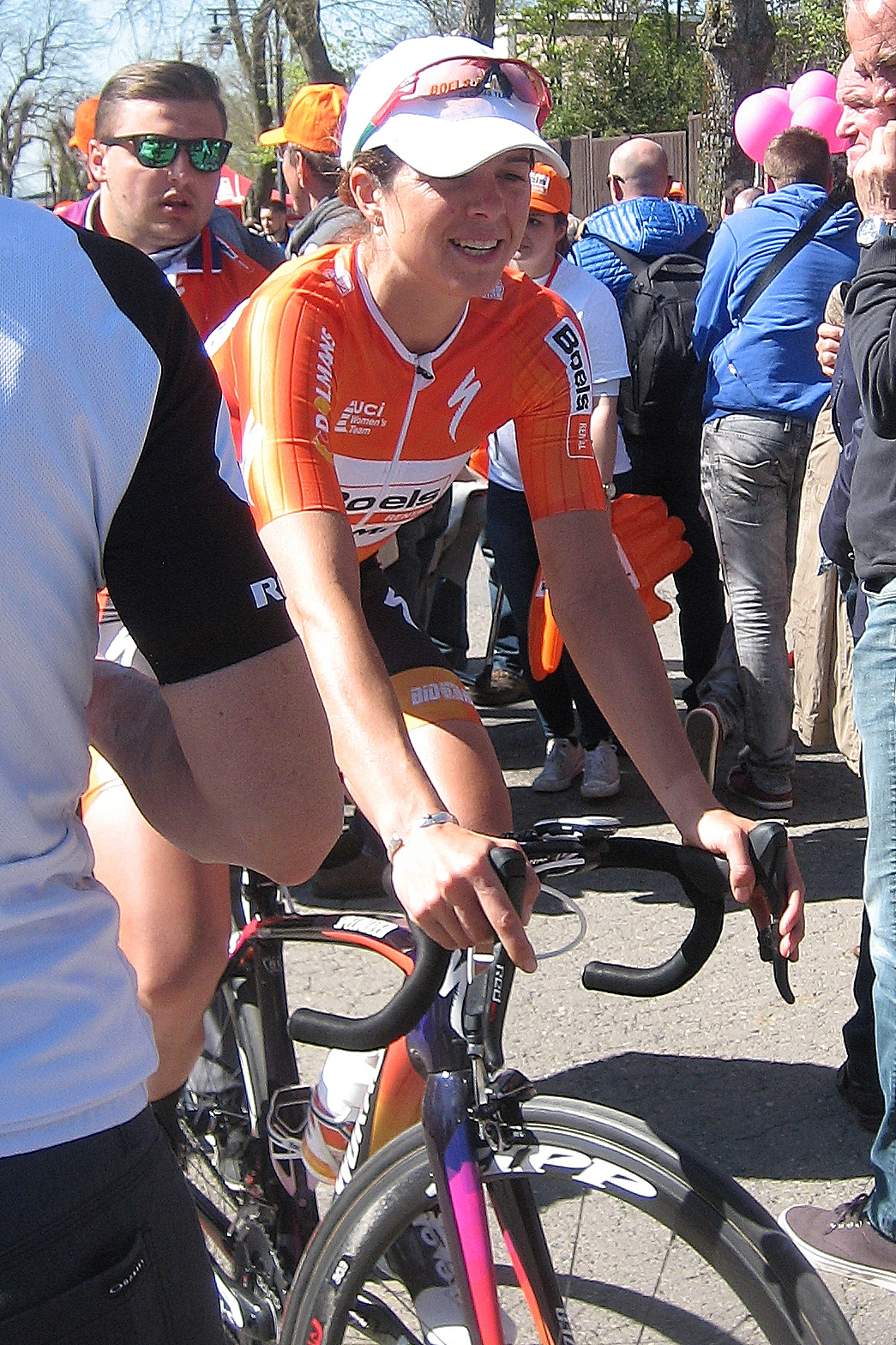
- Stevens at the 2016 La Flèche Wallonne Féminine

Personal information
- Full name: Evelyn Lee Stevens
- Born: May 9, 1983 (age 43) Claremont, California
- Height: 1.65 m (5 ft 5 in)
- Weight: 56 kg (123 lb) (2012)

Cycling career
- Sport: Cycling
- Discipline: Road
- Role: Rider
- Rider type: All-rounder

Professional teams
- 2010–2014: Team HTC–Columbia Women
- 2015–2016: Boels–Dolmans

Major wins
- Stage races The Exergy Tour (2012) La Route de France (2012) Women's Tour of New Zealand (2012) Gracia–Orlová (2012) Giro del Trentino Alto Adige-Südtirol (2013) Thüringen Rundfahrt der Frauen (2014) Holland Ladies Tour (2014) One day races National Time Trial Championships (2010, 2011) La Flèche Wallonne Féminine (2012) Other UCI Hour record: 47.980 km
Medal record
Women's road cycling
Representing United States
World Championships
Silver medal – second place	2012 Valkenburg	Time trial
Bronze medal – third place	2014 Ponferrada	Time trial
Pan American Championships
Gold medal – first place	2014 Puebla	Time trial
Silver medal – second place	2011 Medellín	Time trial
Representing Specialized–lululemon
World Championships
Gold medal – first place	2012 Valkenburg	Team time trial
Gold medal – first place	2013 Florence	Team time trial
Gold medal – first place	2014 Ponferrada	Team time trial
Representing Boels–Dolmans
World Championships
Gold medal – first place	2016 Doha	Team time trial

Evelyn Lee Stevens (born May 9, 1983) is an American retired professional road cyclist.

== Early life ==
Stevens was born in Claremont, California, but grew up in Acton, Massachusetts, where she attended Acton-Boxborough Regional High School. She studied government and women and gender studies at Dartmouth College in New Hampshire and was a member of the college's tennis team.

After graduating in 2005 she moved to New York City where she worked for Lehman Brothers for two years, then for mezzanine fund Gleacher Mezzanine before quitting in July 2009 to take up cycling full-time.

== Career ==
She competed at the 2012 Summer Olympics in the women's road race, finishing 24th. In July 2014, Stevens competed at the Giro d'Italia and Thüringen Rundfahrt over 17 consecutive days of racing, finishing 14th and 1st respectively.

On February 27, 2016, Stevens rode to a new UCI Hour record for women at the Olympic Training Center Velodrome in Colorado, United States, with a distance of 47.980 km. She broke the record set January 22 by Australian Bridie O'Donnell in Adelaide, Australia, by 1.1 km. Stevens was one of only three women (along with Trixi Worrack and Ellen van Dijk) to win four gold medals in the women's team time trial at the UCI Road World Championships.

== Major results ==
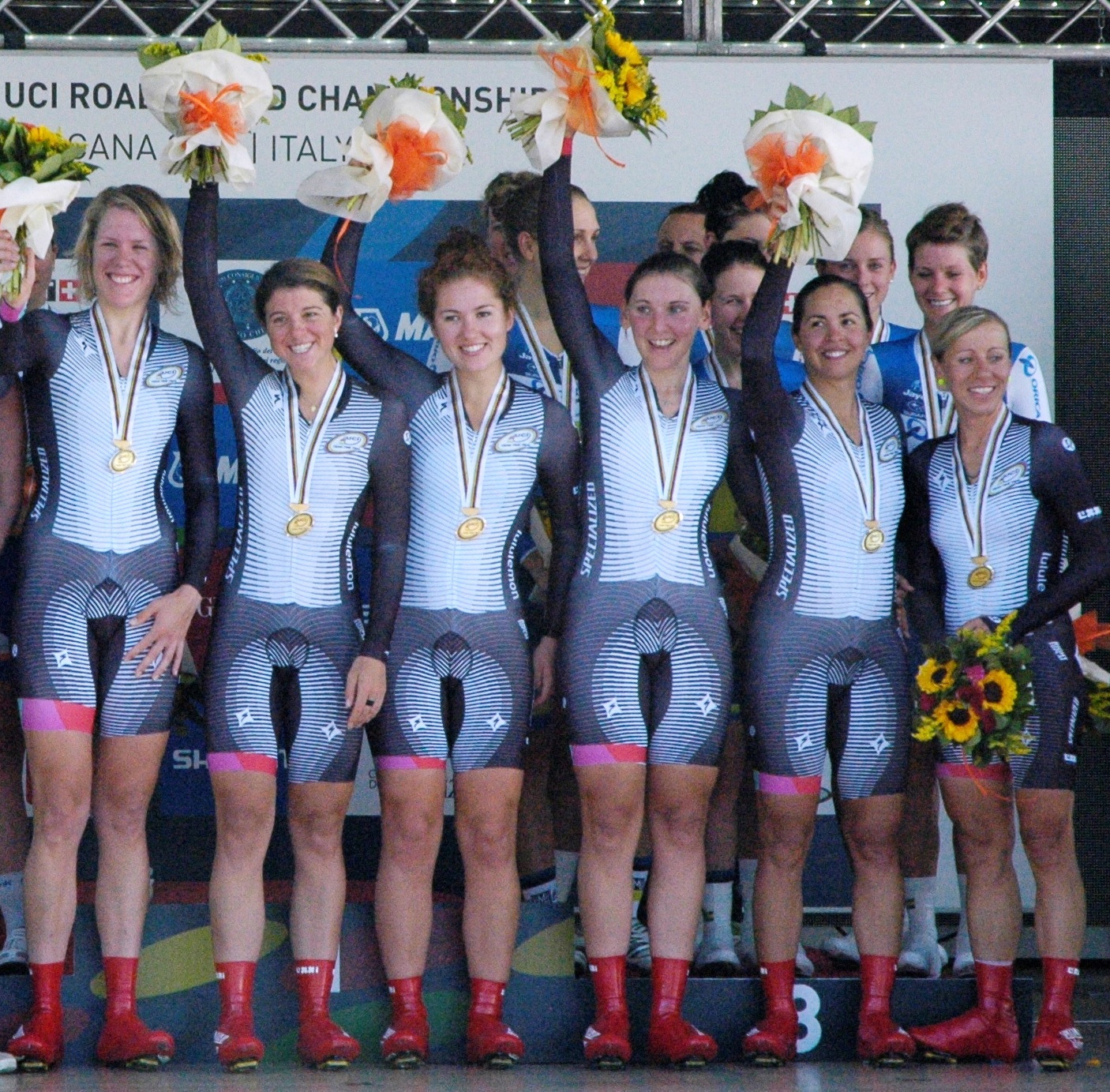
As part of the Specialized–lululemon team, Stevens (second from left) won the team time trial at the 2013 UCI Road World Championships.

2008
1st Green Mountain Stage Race Cat 3/4 Women
2009
1st Overall Tour of the Battenkill
1st Overall Jiminy Peak
1st Overall Bear Mountain
1st Overall Housatonic Hills
1st Overall Fitchburg Longsjo Classic
1st Overall Cascade Cycling Classic
2nd Time trial, National Road Championships
2nd Overall La Route de France

1st Stage 5

2010
1st Time trial, National Road Championships
1st Chrono Gatineau
1st Stage 7 Giro d'Italia Femminile
1st Stage 6 North Star Grand Prix
5th Overall Redlands Bicycle Classic

1st Stage 3

5th La Flèche Wallonne Féminine
5th GP de Plouay – Bretagne
6th UCI Road World Championships – Women's time trial
6th Sparkassen Giro
9th Overall Giro della Toscana Int. Femminile – Memorial Michela Fanini
2011
1st Time trial, National Road Championships
1st Stage 2 (TTT) Trophée d'Or Féminin
1st Stage 5 Tour Cycliste Féminin International de l'Ardèche
2nd Time trial, Pan American Road Championships
2nd GP de Plouay – Bretagne
7th Grand Prix Elsy Jacobs
9th Memorial Davide Fardelli
9th Chrono Champenois
2012
UCI Road World Championships

1st Team time trial (with Ellen van Dijk, Charlotte Becker, Amber Neben, Ina-Yoko Teutenberg and Trixi Worrack)
2nd UCI Road World Championships – Women's time trial

1st Overall Women's Tour of New Zealand
1st Overall Gracia-Orlová

1st Points classification
1st Stage 1

1st Overall Exergy Tour
1st Overall La Route de France

1st Stages 7 & 9

1st La Flèche Wallonne Féminine
Open de Suède Vårgårda

1st Team time trial
9th Road race

1st Stage 4b (TTT) Energiewacht Tour
2nd Time trial, National Road Championships
2nd Overall Holland Ladies Tour

1st Stage 2 (TTT)

2nd Chrono Gatineau
3rd Overall Giro d'Italia Femminile

1st Stage 3

5th GP de Plouay – Bretagne
10th Grand Prix Cycliste de Gatineau
2013
1st UCI Road World Championships – Women's team time trial (with Ellen van Dijk, Carmen Small, Katie Colclough, Lisa Brennauer and Trixi Worrack)
1st Overall Giro del Trentino Alto Adige-Südtirol

1st Points classification
1st Stage 1b

1st Philadelphia Cycling Classic
1st Amgen Tour of California Women's Time Trial
1st Merco Cycling Classic
Open de Suède Vårgårda

1st Team time trial
6th Road race

1st Stage 1 (TTT) Belgium Tour
1st Stage 2 (TTT) Holland Ladies Tour
2nd Overall Gracia-Orlová

1st Stage 1

3rd Overall Emakumeen Euskal Bira
3rd Overall La Route de France
3rd Durango-Durango Emakumeen Saria
4th UCI Road World Championships – Women's time trial
5th UCI Road World Championships – Women's Road race
5th Overall Giro d'Italia Femminile
2014
1st Team time trial (with Carmen Small, Lisa Brennauer, Chantal Blaak, Karol-Ann Canuel, and Trixi Worrack)
1st Time trial, Pan American Road Championships
1st Overall Thüringen Rundfahrt der Frauen

1st Stage 4
Active rider award, Stage 2

1st Overall Holland Ladies Tour
1st Philadelphia Cycling Classic
1st Open de Suède Vårgårda TTT
National Road Championships

3rd Road race
3rd Time trial

3rd UCI Road World Championships – Women's time trial
4th La Flèche Wallonne Féminine
10th Tour of Flanders for Women
2015
1st Amgen Tour of California Women's Time Trial
1st Mountains classification Ladies Tour of Norway
2nd UCI Road World Championships – Women's team time trial
3rd Overall Women's Tour of New Zealand

1st Stage 1 (TTT)

3rd Crescent Women World Cup Vårgårda TTT
4th Durango-Durango Emakumeen Saria
6th UCI Road World Championships – Women's time trial
6th La Flèche Wallonne Féminine
6th Philadelphia Cycling Classic
7th Time trial, EPZ Omloop van Borsele
8th GP de Plouay
9th Overall Giro d'Italia Femminile
10th Overall Emakumeen Euskal Bira
2016
Hour record: 47.980 km
1st Team time trial, UCI Road World Championships
1st Crescent Vårgårda UCI Women's WorldTour TTT
2nd Overall Giro d'Italia Femminile

1st Stages 2, 6 & 7 (ITT)

2nd La Flèche Wallonne Féminine
3rd Overall Tour of California
4th Philadelphia Cycling Classic
8th Overall Emakumeen Euskal Bira
10th Time trial, Summer Olympics

2019
1st 2019 Credit Suisse Sponsored Flywheel World Championships
