= Tour Languedoc Roussillon =

Race details
- Date: May
- Region: France
- Discipline: Road
- Type: Stage race

History
- First edition: 2013
- Editions: 1 (as of 2013)
- First winner: Emma Pooley (GBR)
- Most wins: No repeat winners
- Most recent: Emma Pooley (GBR)

Tour Languedoc Roussillon was a women's staged cycle race which took place in France and was rated by the UCI as 2.2.

== Overall winners ==
Year	Winner	Second	Third
2013	(United Kingdom) Emma Pooley	(Russia) Tatiana Antoshina	(Belarus) Alena Amialiusik
