= Katie Colclough =

English racing cyclist (born 1970)

Personal information
- Full name: Katie Amanda Colclough
- Born: 20 January 1990 (age 36) Grantham, England
- Height: 1.68 m (5 ft 6 in)

Cycling career
- Sport: Cycling
- Current team: Retired
- Disciplines: Road and track
- Role: Rider
- Rider type: Endurance

Amateur teams
- 2002–2006: Sleaford Wheelers C.C.
- 2008: Team Halfords Bikehut

Professional teams
- 2011: HTC–High Road
- 2012–2013: Specialized–lululemon

Major wins
- World Team Time Trial Champion (Europe) European Champion U23 (United Kingdom) British Champion Junior
Medal record
Women's Track cycling
Representing Great Britain
European Elite Championships
Gold medal – first place	2010 Pruszków	Team pursuit
Women's Road bicycle racing
Representing Specialized–lululemon
World Championships
Gold medal – first place	2013 Florence	Team Time Trial

Katie Amanda Colclough (born 20 January 1990) is a retired English road and track cyclist from Frieston near Grantham, Lincolnshire, and a former member of British Cycling's Olympic Development Squad.

== Early life ==
She attended Caythorpe primary and the Sir William Robertson School.

== Career ==
Colclough began cycling competitively in 2004, the following year she was selected to ride for British Cycling's Talent Team. She joined the Olympic Development Programme in 2006.

In 2008-2009 Colclough rode road races with Team Halfords Bikehut. In 2011, she signed with the professional team HTC–Highroad Women (now known as Specialized–lululemon). Colclough was part of the Specialized–lululemon squad which won the team time trial at the 2013 UCI Road World Championships, where she announced that she would be retiring from the sport after the road race.

== Palmarès ==
2007
2nd Olveston National Series Road Race

2008 – Team Halfords Bikehut 2008 season
1st Team pursuit, UEC European U23 Track Championships
1st (United Kingdom) Points Race, British National Track Championships (Junior)
2nd Points Race, British National Track Championships (Senior)
2nd Pursuit, British National Track Championships (Junior)
1st Team pursuit, Round 1, 2008–09 Track World Cup, Manchester
3rd Points race, Round 1, 2008–09 Track World Cup, Manchester
1st Team pursuit, Round 2, 2008–09 Track World Cup, Melbourne

2009
1st Team pursuit, Round 5, 2008–09 Track World Cup, Copenhagen
2nd Points race, Round 5, 2008–09 Track World Cup, Copenhagen
2nd British National Road Race Championships Under 23
2nd European road cycling championships, road race, Under 23
2nd, Team pursuit, 2009–2010 Track World Cup, Melbourne

2010
1st Team pursuit, 2010 European Track Championships

2011 – HTC–Highroad 2011 season
UEC European U23 Track Championships

1st Team Pursuit (with Laura Trott and Dani King)
2nd Points Race

2012 – Team Specialized–lululemon 2012 season
1st Stage 4, Gracia–Orlová
1st British National Road Race Championships Under 23

2013 – Specialized–lululemon 2013 season

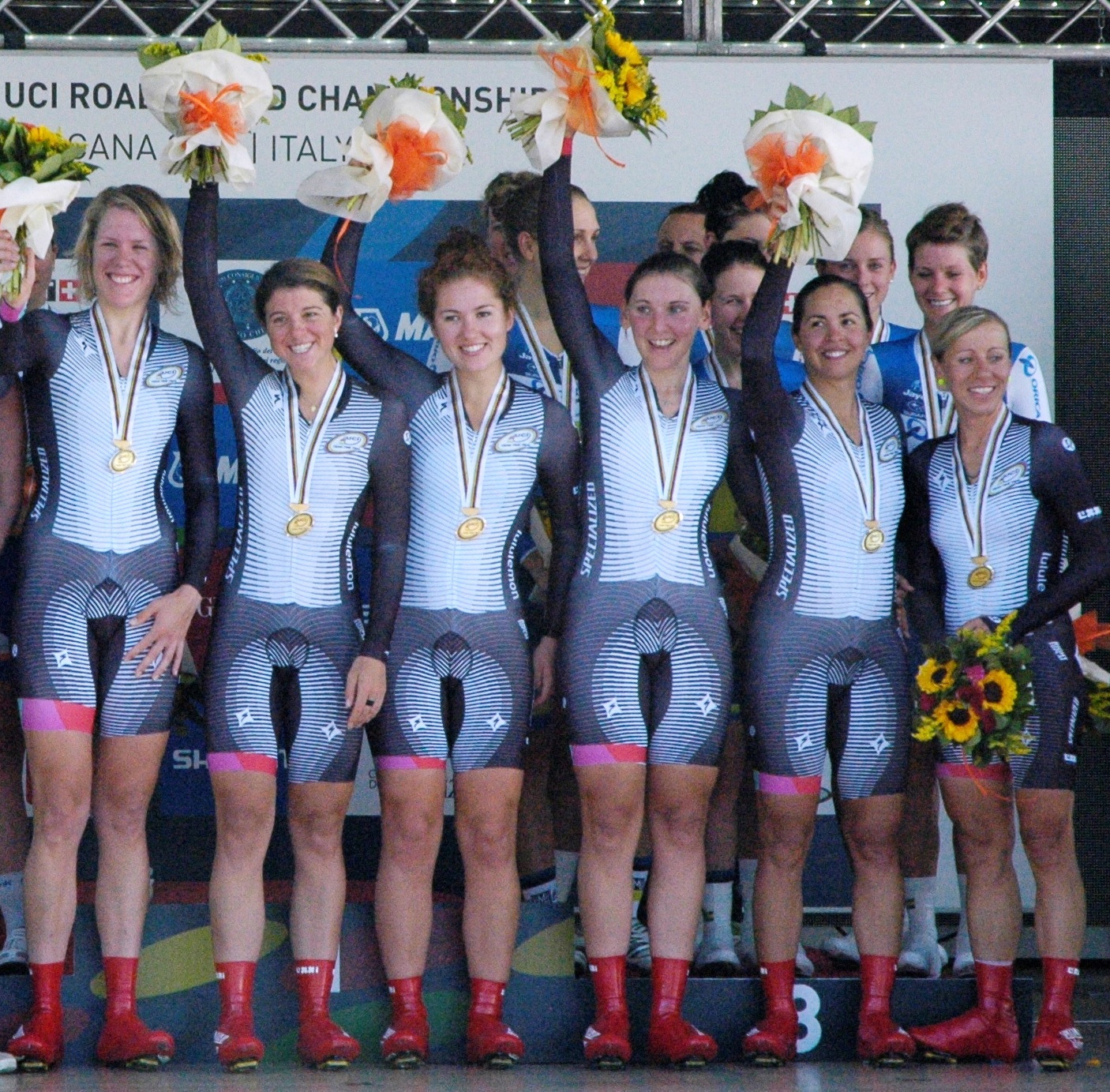
Colclough (third from the left) won with Specialized–lululemon the team time trial at the 2013 UCI Road World Championships.

1st World Championship, Team Time Trial (together with Ellen van Dijk, Carmen Small, Evelyn Stevens, Lisa Brennauer and Trixi Worrack)
3rd British National Time Trial Championships
