= Carmen Small =

American road racing cyclist

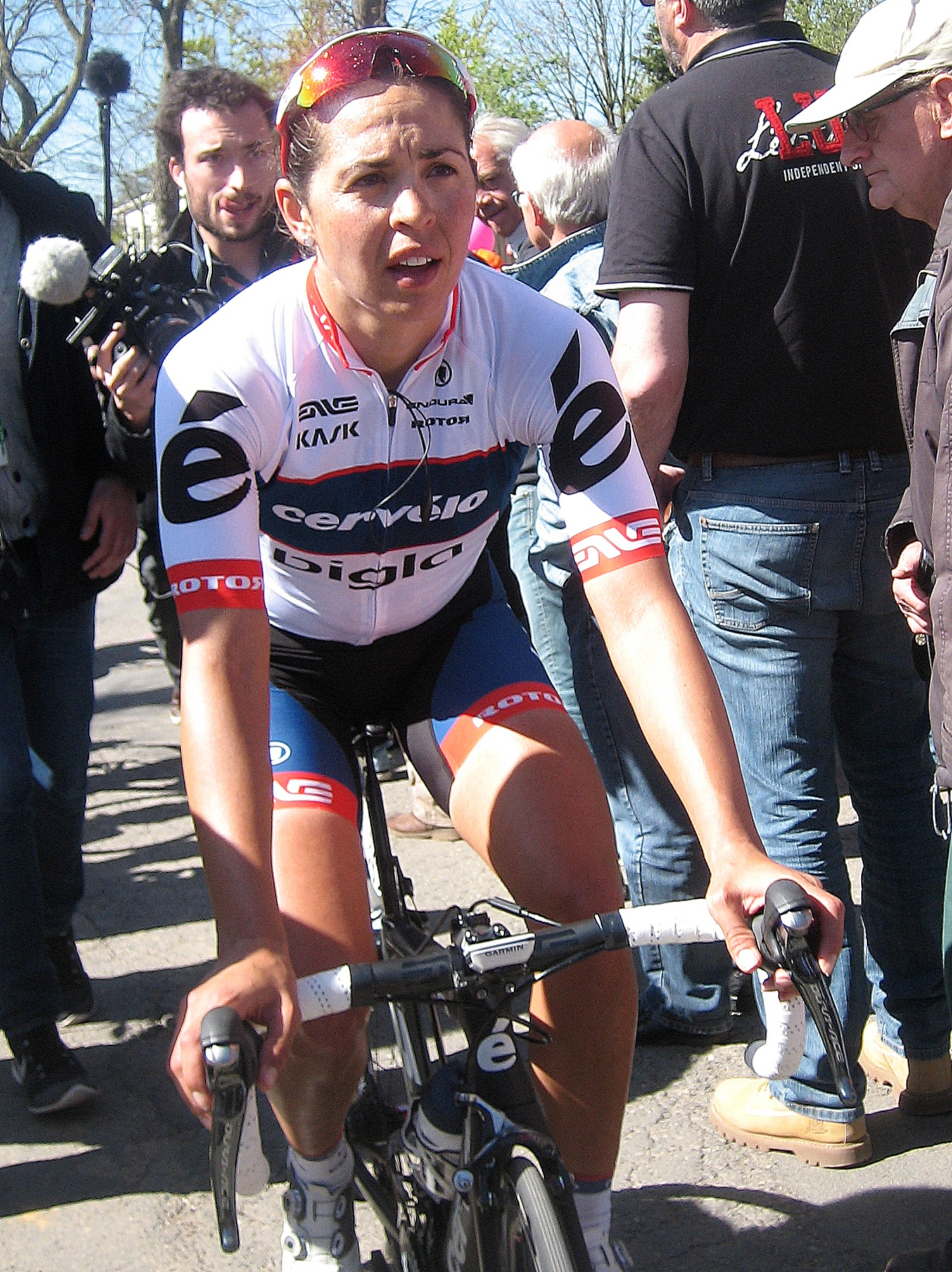
- Small at the 2016 La Flèche Wallonne Féminine

Personal information
- Full name: Carmen Small
- Born: April 20, 1980 (age 46) Durango, Colorado, United States

Cycling career
- Sport: Cycling
- Current team: EF Education–Oatly
- Disciplines: Road; Track
- Role: Rider (retired); Directeur sportif
- Rider type: Time trialist (road); Pursuitist (track)

Amateur team
- 2007–2008: Aaron's Cycling Team

Professional teams
- 2009: SC Michela Fanini Record Rox
- 2009–2010: Colavita–Sutter Home
- 2011: Team TIBCO–To The Top
- 2012: Optum Pro Cycling
- 2013–2014: Specialized–lululemon
- 2015: Twenty16 p/b Sho-Air
- 2015–2016: Bigla Pro Cycling Team
- 2016: Cylance Pro Cycling
- 2017: Team VéloCONCEPT

Managerial teams
- 2017–2019: Team Virtu Cycling
- 2020–2021: Ceratizit–WNT Pro Cycling
- 2022–2023: Team Jumbo–Visma
- 2024: EF Education–Cannondale
Medal record
Representing United States
Road World Championships
Bronze medal – third place	2013 Florence	Time trial
Pan American Championships
Gold medal – first place	2015 León	Time trial
Silver medal – second place	2013 Zacatecas	Time trial
Representing Specialized–lululemon
Road World Championships
Gold medal – first place	2013 Florence	Team time trial
Gold medal – first place	2014 Ponferrada	Team time trial

Carmen Small (born April 22, 1980) is an American former racing cyclist, who currently works as a directeur sportif for UCI Women's WorldTeam EF Education–Oatly.

Outside of cycling, Small was a founding member of The Cyclists' Alliance and served as vice director from 2018 to 2019.

== Major results ==
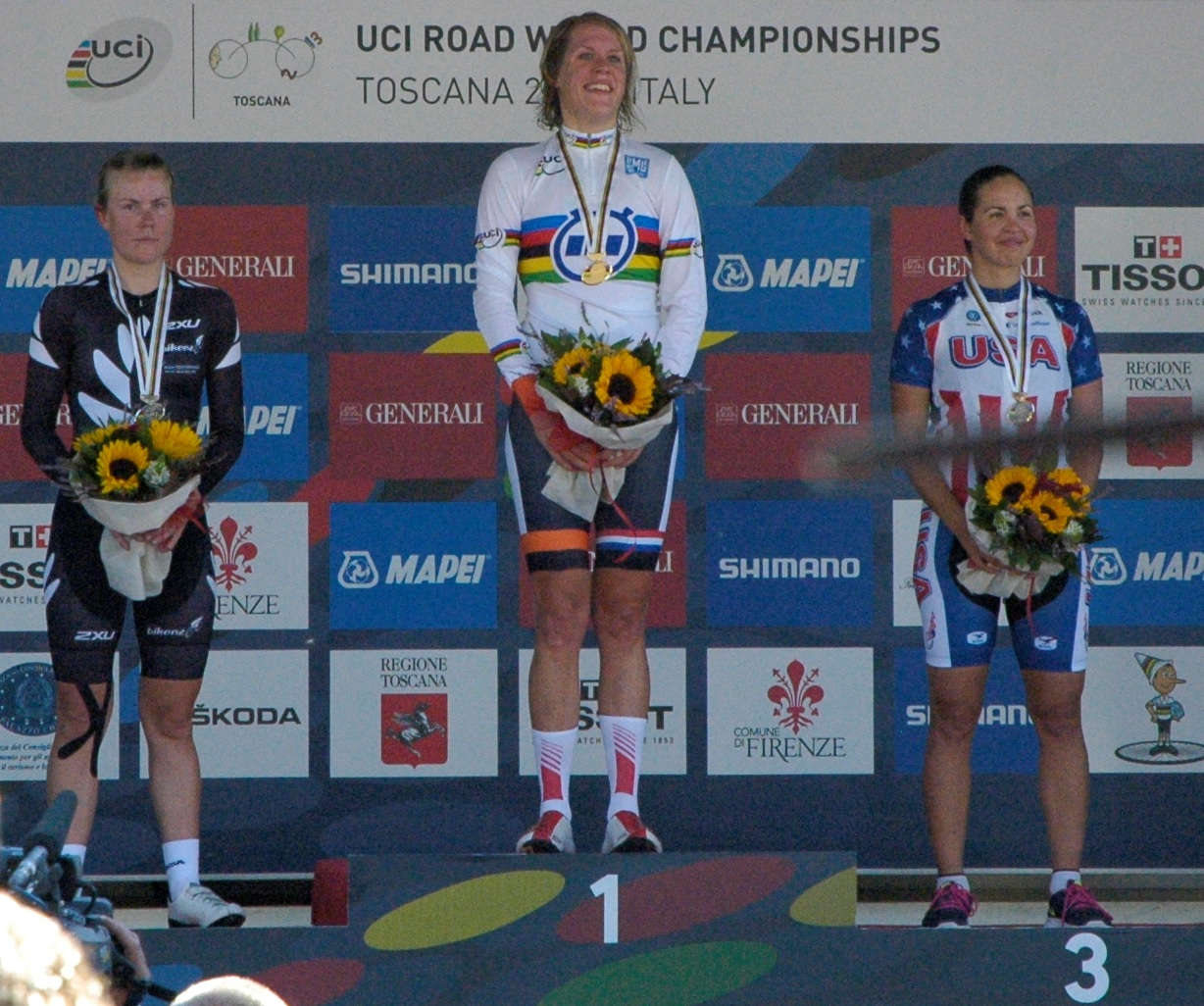
Small (right) finished third in the time trial at the 2013 UCI Road World Championships, behind Ellen van Dijk (centre) and Linda Villumsen (left).

2008
8th Grand Prix Elsy Jacobs
2010
3rd Road race, National Road Championships
10th Overall Redlands Bicycle Classic
2011
6th Time trial, National Road Championships
2012
1st Classica Citta di Padova
2nd Chrono Champenois
National Road Championships

3rd Road race
4th Time trial

5th Grand Prix Cycliste de Gatineau
7th Grand Prix de Dottignies
7th Chrono Gatineau
9th Overall The Exergy Tour
2013
1st Team time trial (with Ellen van Dijk, Evelyn Stevens, Lisa Brennauer and Trixi Worrack)
1st Time trial, National Road Championships
1st Chrono Gatineau
1st Stage 1 (TTT) Belgium Tour
1st Stage 2 (TTT) Holland Ladies Tour
1st Stage 2 Thüringen Rundfahrt der Frauen
2nd Time trial, Pan American Road Championships
2nd Chrono Champenois – Trophée Européen
3rd UCI Road World Championships – Women's time trial
4th Ronde van Gelderland
10th Ronde van Drenthe World Cup
10th Trofeo Alfredo Binda-Comune di Cittiglio
2014
1st Team time trial, UCI Road World Championships
1st Open de Suède Vårgårda TTT
2nd Time trial, National Road Championships
9th GP Comune di Cornaredo
2015
1st Time trial, Pan American Road Championships
1st Chrono Gatineau
2nd Time trial, National Road Championships
6th Winston-Salem Cycling Classic
2016
1st Time trial, National Road Championships
1st Mountains classification Grand Prix Elsy Jacobs
3rd Overall Cascade Cycling Classic

1st Stage 1

5th Overall Emakumeen Euskal Bira
5th Gent–Wevelgem
6th Overall Ladies Tour of Norway
6th Madrid Challenge by La Vuelta
7th GP de Plouay – Bretagne
8th RideLondon Grand Prix
10th Omloop Het Nieuwsblad
