= 2012 in women's road cycling =

== UCI Road World Rankings ==
| Top-ranked individual | Second-ranked individual | Third-ranked individual | Top-ranked team | Top-ranked nation |
|---|---|---|---|---|
| Marianne Vos (NED); Rabobank Women Cycling Team | Judith Arndt (GER); Orica–AIS | Emma Johansson (SWE); Hitec Products–Mistral Home Cycling Team | Rabobank Women Cycling Team | Netherlands |

== World Championships ==
| Race | Date | Winner | Second | Third |
|---|---|---|---|---|
| World Championship Team Time Trial | September 22 | Team Specialized–lululemon; Charlotte Becker (GER); Ellen van Dijk (NED); Amber Neben (USA); Evelyn Stevens (USA); Ina-Yoko Teutenberg (GER); Trixi Worrack (GER) | Orica–AIS; Judith Arndt (GER); Shara Gillow (AUS); Loes Gunnewijk (NED); Melissa Hoskins (AUS); Alex Rhodes (AUS); Linda Villumsen (NZL) | AA Drink–leontien.nl; Chantal Blaak (NED); Lucinda Brand (NED); Jessie Daams (BEL); Sharon Laws (GBR); Emma Pooley (GBR); Kirsten Wild (NED) |
| World Championship Time Trial | September 24 | Judith Arndt (GER) | Evelyn Stevens (USA) | Linda Villumsen (NZL) |
| World Championship Road Race | September 28 | Marianne Vos (NED) | Rachel Neylan (AUS) | Elisa Longo Borghini (ITA) |

== Olympic Games ==
| Race | Date | Winner | Second | Third |
|---|---|---|---|---|
| (International Olympic Committee) Olympic Games Road Race | July 29 | Marianne Vos (NED) | Lizzie Armitstead (GBR) | Olga Zabelinskaya (RUS) |
| (International Olympic Committee) Olympic Games Time Trial | August 1 | Kristin Armstrong (USA) | Judith Arndt (GER) | Olga Zabelinskaya (RUS) |

== UCI World Cup ==
| | Race | Date | Winner | Second | Third |
|---|---|---|---|---|---|
| #1 | (Netherlands) Ronde van Drenthe | 10 March | Marianne Vos (NED) | Kirsten Wild (NED) | Emma Johansson (SWE) |
| #2 | (Italy) Trofeo Alfredo Binda-Comune di Cittiglio | 25 March | Marianne Vos (NED) | Tatiana Guderzo (ITA) | Trixi Worrack (GER) |
| #3 | (Belgium) Tour of Flanders | 1 April | Judith Arndt (GER) | Kristin Armstrong (USA) | Joëlle Numainville (CAN) |
| #4 | (Belgium) La Flèche Wallonne Féminine | 18 April | Evelyn Stevens (USA) | Marianne Vos (NED) | Linda Villumsen (NZL) |
| #5 | (China) Tour of Chongming Island World Cup | 13 August | Shelley Olds (USA) | Melissa Hoskins (AUS) | Monia Baccaille (ITA) |
| #6 | (Sweden) Open de Suède Vårgårda TTT | 17 August | Specialized–lululemon; Charlotte Becker (GER); Amber Neben (USA); Evelyn Stevens (USA); Ina Teutenberg (GER); Ellen van Dijk (NED); Trixi Worrack (GER) | Orica–AIS; Judith Arndt (GER); Shara Gillow (AUS); Loes Gunnewijk (NED); Claudia Häusler (GER); Alexis Rhodes (cyclist) (AUS); Linda Villumsen (NZL) | Rabobank; Tatiana Antoshina (RUS); Thalita de Jong (NED); Liesbet De Vocht (BEL); Roxane Knetemann (NED); Iris Slappendel (NED); Marianne Vos (NED) |
| #7 | (Sweden) Open de Suède Vårgårda | 19 August | Iris Slappendel (NED) | Hanka Kupfernagel (GER) | Marianne Vos (NED) |
| #8 | (France) GP de Plouay | 25 August | Marianne Vos (NED) | Tiffany Cromwell (AUS) | Elisa Longo Borghini (ITA) |

== Single day races (1.1 and 1.2) ==
| Race | Date | Cat | Winner | Second | Third | Ref |
|---|---|---|---|---|---|---|
| (Belgium) Omloop Het Nieuwsblad | February 25 | 1.2 | Loes Gunnewijk (NED) | Ellen van Dijk (NED) | Trixi Worrack (GER) | |
| (Belgium) Le Samyn des Dames | February 29 | 1.2 | Adrie Visser (NED) | Noemi Cantele (ITA) | Trixi Worrack (GER) | |
| (Belgium) Omloop van het Hageland | March 4 | 1.2 | Lizzie Armitstead (GBR) | Pauline Ferrand-Prévot (FRA) | Elisa Longo Borghini (ITA) | |
| (Netherlands) Drentse 8 van Dwingeloo | March 8 | 1.2 | Chloe Hosking (AUS) | Giorgia Bronzini (ITA) | Marianne Vos (NED) | |
| (Netherlands) Novilon Euregio Cup | March 11 | 1.1 | Marianne Vos (NED) | Marta Bastianelli (ITA) | Lizzie Armitstead (GBR) | |
| (El Salvador) Grand Prix el Salvador | March 15 | 1.1 | Noemi Cantele (ITA) | Tatiana Guderzo (ITA) | Amber Neben (USA) | |
| (Italy) Classica Citta di Padova | March 17 | 1.1 | Carmen Small (USA) | Simona Frapporti (ITA) | Monia Baccaille (ITA) | |
| (France) Cholet Pays de Loire Dames | March 18 | 1.2 | Audrey Cordon (FRA) | Pascale Jeuland (FRA) | Emilie Moberg (NOR) | |
| (El Salvador) Grand Prix GSB | March 21 | 1.1 | Evelyn García (ESA) | Arlenis Sierra Canadilla (CUB) | Alena Amialiusik (BLR) | |
| (Belgium) Grand Prix de Dottignies | April 2 | 1.2 | Monia Baccaille (ITA) | Emma Johansson (SWE) | Alyona Andruk (UKR) | |
| (Belgium) Halle-Buizingen | April 15 | 1.2 | Chloe Hosking (AUS) | Emma Johansson (SWE) | Liesbet De Vocht (BEL) | |
| (Netherlands) Ronde van Gelderland | April 15 | 1.2 | Suzanne de Goede (NED) | Chantal Blaak (NED) | Megan Guarnier (USA) | |
| (Netherlands) EPZ Omloop van Borsele | April 21 | 1.2 | Ellen van Dijk (NED) | Gracie Elvin (AUS) | Sarah Düster (GER) | |
| (Belgium) GP Stad Roeselare | April 22 | 1.1 | Annemiek van Vleuten (NED) | Christel Ferrier-Bruneau (FRA) | Linda Villumsen (NZL) | |
| (Italy) GP Liberazione | April 25 | 1.1 | Noemi Cantele (ITA) | Inga Čilvinaitė (LTU) | Maria Giulia Confalonieri (ITA) | |
| (Belgium) Knokke-Heist – Bredene | May 5 | 1.2 | Liesbet De Vocht (BEL) | Else Belmans (BEL) | Maaike Polspoel (BEL) | |
| (Azerbaijan) Heydar Aliyev Anniversary Time Trial | May 9 | 1.2 | Elena Tchalykh (AZE) | Olena Pavlukhina (UKR) | Aleksandra Sošenko (LTU) | |
| (Venezuela) Clasico Aniversario De La Federacion Veneolana De Ciclismo | May 13 | 1.2 | Mayra Del Rocio Rocha (MEX) | Angie González (VEN) | Lilibeth Chacón García (VEN) | |
| (Venezuela) Copa Federación Venezolana de Ciclismo Corre por la Vida | May 13 | 1.2 | Janildes Fernandes Silva (BRA) | Lilibeth Chacón García (VEN) | Mayra Del Rocio Rocha (MEX) | |
| (Republic of Ireland) Celtic Chrono | May 13 | 1.2 | Wendy Houvenaghel (GBR) | Olga Zabelinskaya (RUS) | Hanka Kupfernagel (GER) | |
| (Russia) Grand Prix of Maykop | May 15 | 1.2 | Anastasia Chulkova (RUS) | Oxana Kozonchuk (RUS) | Alexandra Chekina (RUS) | |
| (Belgium) Gooik–Geraardsbergen–Gooik | May 17 | 1.2 | Liesbet De Vocht (BEL) | Sharon Laws (GBR) | Elisa Longo Borghini (ITA) | |
| (China) Tour of Zhoushan Island II | May 18 | 1.2 | Xiao Hui Liu (CHN) | Ah Reum Na (KOR) | Liu Xin (CHN) | |
| (Canada) Chrono Gatineau | May 19 | 1.1 | Clara Hughes (CAN) | Evelyn Stevens (USA) | Amber Neben (USA) | |
| (Venezuela) Copa Fundadeporte | May 19 | 1.2 | Angie González (VEN) | Maria Briceno (VEN) | Yumari Gonzales Valdivieso (CUB) | |
| (Italy) GP Comune di Cornaredo | May 20 | 1.2 | Iris Slappendel (NED) | Marianne Vos (NED) | Annemiek van Vleuten (NED) | |
| (Venezuela) Clasico Fundadeporte | May 20 | 1.2 | Mayra Del Rocio Rocha (MEX) | Clemilda Fernandes Silva (BRA) | Danielys García (VEN) | |
| (Canada) Grand Prix Cycliste de Gatineau | May 21 | 1.1 | Ina Teutenberg (GER) | Rochelle Gilmore (AUS) | Alyona Andruk (UKR) | |
| (Netherlands) Parkhotel Valkenburg Hills Classic | May 25 | 1.2 | Annemiek van Vleuten (NED) | Marianne Vos (NED) | Sharon Laws (GBR) | |
| (Netherlands) 7-Dorpenomloop Aalburg | May 26 | 1.2 | Annemiek van Vleuten (NED) | Shelley Olds (USA) | Amanda Spratt (AUS) | |
| (United States) Liberty Classic | June 2 | 1.1 | Ina Teutenberg (GER) | Rochelle Gilmore (AUS) | Giorgia Bronzini (ITA) | |
| (Spain) Emakumeen Saria | June 5 | 1.2 | Emma Pooley (GBR) | Charlotte Becker (GER) | Judith Arndt (GER) | |
| (Syria) Golan I | June 17 | 1.2 | | | | |
| (Syria) Golan II | June 19 | 1.2 | | | | |
| (Belgium) Dwars door de Westhoek | July 15 | 1.2 | Kim de Baat (NED) | Laura van der Kamp (NED) | Martina Zwick (GER) | |
| (Belgium) Erpe-Mere (Erondegem) | August 4 | 1.2 | Adrie Visser (NED) | Liesbet De Vocht (BEL) | Janneke Kanis (NED) | |
| (Italy) Memorial Davide Fardelli – Cronometro Individuale | September 9 | 1.1 | Edwige Pitel (FRA) | Martina Ritter (AUT) | Pascale Schnider (SUI) | |
| (France) Chrono Champenois – Trophée Européen | September 9 | 1.1 | Wendy Houvenaghel (GBR) | Carmen Small (USA) | Olga Zabelinskaya (RUS) | |
| (France) Chrono des Nations | 21 October | 1.1 | Amber Neben (USA) | Alison Starnes (USA) | Edwige Pitel (FRA) | |

== Stage races (2.1 and 2.2) ==
| Race | Date | Cat. | Winner | Second | Third | Ref |
|---|---|---|---|---|---|---|
| Ladies Tour of Qatar | February 1–3 | 2.1 | Judith Arndt (GER) | Trixi Worrack (GER) | Kirsten Wild (NED) | |
| Women's Tour of New Zealand | February 22–26 | 2.2 | Evelyn Stevens (USA) | Shara Gillow (AUS) | Taryn Heather (AUS) | |
| Vuelta a El Salvador | March 16–20 | 2.2 | Clemilda Fernandes Silva (BRA) | Tatiana Guderzo (ITA) | Evelyn García (ESA) | |
| (Netherlands) Energiewacht Tour | April 4–8 | 2.2 | Ina Teutenberg (GER) | Ellen van Dijk (NED) | Marianne Vos (NED) | |
| Maha Chakri Sirindhon's Cup Women's Tour of Thailand | April 8–10 | 2.2 | Liu Xin (CHN) | Mayuko Hagiwara (JPN) | Sun Ae Choi (KOR) | |
| (Czech Republic) Gracia–Orlová | April 25–29 | 2.2 | Marianne Vos (NED) | Annemiek van Vleuten (NED) | Adrie Visser (NED) | |
| (Luxembourg) Festival Luxembourgeois du Cyclisme Féminin Elsy Jacobs | April 27–29 | 2.1 | Evelyn Stevens (USA) | Trixi Worrack (GER) | Sharon Laws (GBR) | |
| (China) Tour of Chongming Island | May 9–11 | 2.2 | Melissa Hoskins (AUS) | Monia Baccaille (ITA) | Liesbet De Vocht (BEL) | |
| (China) Tour of Zhoushan Island I | May 9–11 | 2.2 | Emilie Moberg (NOR) | Jutatip Maneephan (THA) | Zhao Juan Meng (HKG) | |
| (Russia) Tour of Adygeya | May 17–20 | 2.2 | Alexandra Burchenkova (RUS) | Marina Likhanova (RUS) | Irina Molicheva (RUS) | |
| (South Africa) Tour de Free State | May 23–27 | 2.1 | Emma Johansson (SWE) | Hanka Kupfernagel (GER) | Ashleigh Moolman (RSA) | |
| (United States) The Exergy Tour | May 24–28 | 2.2 | Evelyn Stevens (USA) | Amber Neben (USA) | Clara Hughes (CAN) | |
| (Spain) Emakumeen Euskal Bira | June 7–10 | 2.1 | Judith Arndt (GER) | Emma Johansson (SWE) | Annemiek van Vleuten (NED) | |
| (Netherlands) Rabo Ster Zeeuwsche Eilanden | June 14–16 | 2.2 | Kirsten Wild (NED) | Amy Cure (AUS) | Amy Pieters (NED) | |
| (Italy) Giro del Trentino Alto Adige–Südtirol | June 16–17 | 2.1 | Linda Melanie Villumsen (NZL) | Olga Zabelinskaya (RUS) | Emma Pooley (GBR) | |
| (Italy) Giro d'Italia Internazionale Femminile | June 29 – July 8 | 2.1 | Marianne Vos (NED) | Emma Pooley (GBR) | Evelyn Stevens (USA) | |
| (Czech Republic) Tour de Feminin – O cenu Českého Švýcarska | July 5–8 | 2.2 | Larisa Pankova (RUS) | Carla Ryan (AUS) | Martina Ritter (AUT) | |
| (France) Tour de Bretagne Féminin | July 12–15 | 2.2 | Anna van der Breggen (NED) | Sofie De Vuyst (BEL) | Aude Biannic (FRA) | |
| (Germany) Internationale Thüringen Rundfahrt der Frauen | July 16–22 | 2.1 | Judith Arndt (GER) | Trixi Worrack (GER) | Emma Johansson (SWE) | |
| (France) Tour Féminin en Limousin | July 19–22 | 2.2 | Marianne Vos (NED) | Alena Amialiusik (BLR) | Loes Gunnewijk (NED) | |
| La Route de France | August 4–12 | 2.1 | Evelyn Stevens (USA) | Kristin McGrath (USA) | Carlee Taylor (AUS) | |
| (France) Trophée d'Or Féminin | August 18–22 | 2.2 | Elena Cecchini (ITA) | Anna van der Breggen (NED) | Marta Tagliaferro (ITA) | |
| (Belgium) Lotto–Decca Tour | August 25–27 | 2.2 | Ellen van Dijk (NED) | Liesbet De Vocht (BEL) | Lisa Brennauer (GER) | |
| (Italy) Giro della Toscana Int. Femminile – Memorial Michela Fanini | August 29 – September 2 | 2.1 | Małgorzata Jasińska (POL) | Lauren Hall (USA) | Romy Kasper (GER) | |
| (France) Tour Cycliste Féminin International de l'Ardèche | September 3–8 | 2.2 | Emma Pooley (GBR) | Ashleigh Moolman (RSA) | Tayler Wiles (USA) | |
| (Netherlands) BrainWash Ladies Tour | September 4–9 | 2.2 | Marianne Vos (NED) | Evelyn Stevens (USA) | Judith Arndt (GER) | |

== Continental Championships ==
=== African Championship ===
| Race | Date | Winner | Second | Third |
|---|---|---|---|---|
| Road race | November 11, 2011 | Ashleigh Moolman (RSA) | Cherise Taylor (RSA) | Aurelie Halbwachs (MRI) |
| Individual time trial | November 13, 2011 | Cherise Taylor (RSA) | Ashleigh Moolman (RSA) | Aurelie Halbwachs (MRI) |

=== Asian Championships ===
| Race | Date | Winner | Second | Third |
|---|---|---|---|---|
| Road race | February | Hsiao Mei-yu (TPE) | Gu Sun-Geun (KOR) | Jutatip Maneephan (THA) |
| Individual time trial | February | Na Ah-Reum (KOR) | Minami Uwano (JPN) | Wang Cui (CHN) |

=== European Championships (under-23) ===
| Race | Date | Winner | Second | Third |
|---|---|---|---|---|
| Road race (under-23) | | (Belgium) Evelyn Arys | (Italy) Barbara Guarischi | (Netherlands) Kim de Baat |
| Individual time trial (under-23) | | (Netherlands) Anna van der Breggen | (Germany) Mieke Kröger | (Italy) Elisa Longo Borghini |

=== Oceania Championships ===
| Race | Date | Winner | Second | Third |
|---|---|---|---|---|
| Road race | | | | |
| Individual time trial | | | | |

=== Pan American Championships ===
| Race | Date | Winner | Second | Third |
|---|---|---|---|---|
| Road race | March 9 | Yumari González (CUB) | Leah Kirchmann (CAN) | Janildes Fernandes Silva (BRA) |
| Individual time trial | March 11 | Amber Neben (USA) | Rhae-Christie Shaw (CAN) | Clemilda Fernandes Silva (BRA) |

== See also ==
- 2012 in men's road cycling
