= Alexis Rhodes =

Alexis Rhodes may refer to:

- Alexis Rhodes, known as Asuka Tenjouin in Japan, a character in Yu-Gi-Oh! GX
- Alex Rhodes (cyclist) (born 1984), Australian cyclist

== See also ==
- Alex Rhodes (disambiguation)
