= 2013 EPZ Omloop van Borsele =

Race details
- Dates: 20 April 2013
- Stages: 1
- Distance: 120 km (75 mi)
- Winning time: 3h 05' 56"

Results
	Winner	Vera Koedooder (NED)	(Sengers Ladies Cycling Team)
	Second	Loes Gunnewijk (NED)	(Orica–AIS)
	Third	Lucinda Brand (NED)	(Rabobank-Liv Giant)

The 2013 EPZ Omloop van Borsele is the 11th running of the Omloop van Borsele, a women's cycling event in 's-Heerenhoek, the Netherlands. For women's there was an individual time trial over 19.5 kilometres (12.1 miles) on 19 April and a road race over 120 kilometres (74.6 miles) on 20 April 2013. The race was rated by the UCI as 1.2 category race.

Ellen van Dijk won for the second consecutive year the individual time trial. Due to illness Van Dijk did not start in the road race which she also won in the 2012 edition. Vera Koedooder was this year the fastest.

== Time trial ==
The individual time trial was held on 19 April over a distance of 19.5 kilometres (12.1 miles).

=== Results ===
	Cyclist	Team	Time
1	Ellen van Dijk (NED)	Specialized–lululemon	26' 11.88"
2	Loes Gunnewijk (NED)	Orica–AIS	+25.79"
3	Gillian Carleton (CAN)	Specialized–lululemon	+31.38"
4	Lisa Brennauer (GER)	Specialized–lululemon	+35.64"
5	Shara Gillow (AUS)	Orica–AIS	+36.46"
6	Kristin McGrath (USA)	Exergy TWENTY16	+1' 12.75"
7	Megan Guarnier (USA)	Rabobank-Liv Giant	+1' 13.25"
8	Tayler Wiles (USA)	Specialized–lululemon	+1' 15.73"
9	Katarzyna Pawłowska (POL)	GSD Gestion-Kallisto	+1' 27.02"
10	Lucinda Brand (NED)	Rabobank-Liv Giant	+1' 28.05"

== Road race ==
The road race was held on 20 April over a distance of 120 kilometres (74.6 miles).

=== Results ===
	Cyclist	Team	Time
1	Vera Koedooder (NED)	Sengers Ladies Cycling Team	3h 05' 56"
2	Loes Gunnewijk (NED)	Orica–AIS	s.t.
3	Lucinda Brand (NED)	Rabobank-Liv Giant	+27"
4	Chloe Hosking (AUS)	Hitec Products UCK	+53"
5	Nina Kessler (NED)	Dolmans-Boels Cycling Team	+1' 05"
6	Oxana Kozonchuk (RUS)	RusVelo	+2' 16"
7	Amanda Spratt (AUS)	Orica–AIS	+2' 32"
8	Annemiek van Vleuten (NED)	Rabobank-Liv Giant	+2' 48"
9	Adrie Visser (NED)	Dolmans-Boels Cycling Team	+2' 48"
10	Ilona Hoeksma (NED)	Parkhotel Valkenburg p/b Math Salden	+2' 48"

== See also ==
- 2013 in women's road cycling
