= 2012 Ladies Tour of Qatar =

- Route of the 2012 Ladies Tour of Qatar

Race details
- Dates: 1–3 February 2012
- Stages: 3
- Distance: 304 km (188.9 mi)
- Winning time: 8h 18' 39"

Results
| Jersey awarded to the overall winner | Winner | Judith Arndt (Germany) | (GreenEdge–AIS) |
| | Second | Trixi Worrack (Germany) | (Team Specialized–lululemon) |
| | Third | Kirsten Wild (the Netherlands) | (Netherlands) |
| | Points | Kirsten Wild (the Netherlands) | (Netherlands) |
| Jersey awarded to the youth classification winner | Youth | Chloe Hosking (Australia) | (Team Specialized–lululemon) |
| | Team | Team Specialized–lululemon | |

The 2012 Ladies Tour of Qatar was the third edition of the Ladies Tour of Qatar cycling stage race. It was rated by the UCI as category 2.1, and was held between 3 and 5 February 2012, in Qatar.

== Stages ==
=== Stage 1 ===
1 February 2012 – Camelodrome to Al Khawr, 97 km (60.3 mi)

Extremely windy conditions made stage 1 of the Ladies’ Tour of Qatar very eventful. After taking off early making the best of the tailwind, 7 riders battled it out for victory in Al Khor. In the last kilometres title holder Ellen van Dijk tried her luck taking with her Loes Gunnewijk and Kirsten Wild. But the front group bunched together again for the final sprint. Wild eventually flew to victory beating Hosking and Van Dijk to the line and claiming the first stage of the 2012 edition.

Stage 1 result

| | Rider | Team | Time |
|---|---|---|---|
| 1 | Kirsten Wild (NED) | Netherlands | 2h 16' 50" |
| 2 | Chloe Hosking (AUS) | Team Specialized–lululemon | s.t. |
| 3 | Ellen van Dijk (NED) | Team Specialized–lululemon | s.t. |
| 4 | Judith Arndt (GER) | GreenEdge–AIS | s.t. |
| 5 | Trixi Worrack (GER) | Team Specialized–lululemon | s.t. |
| 6 | Loes Gunnewijk (NED) | GreenEdge–AIS | s.t. |
| 7 | Alex Rhodes (AUS) | GreenEdge–AIS | s.t. |
| 8 | Monia Baccaille (ITA) | MCipollini–Giambenini | + 2' 16" |
| 9 | Charlotte Becker (GER) | Team Specialized–lululemon | + 2' 16" |
| 10 | Jessie MacLean (AUS) | GreenEdge–AIS | + 2' 16" |

General Classification after Stage 1

| | Rider | Team | Time |
|---|---|---|---|
| 1 | Kirsten Wild (NED) | Netherlands | 2h 16' 36" |
| 2 | Chloe Hosking (AUS) | Team Specialized–lululemon | + 8" |
| 3 | Judith Arndt (GER) | Gewiss–Ballan | + 9" |
| 4 | Ellen van Dijk (NED) | Team Specialized–lululemon | + 10" |
| 5 | Trixi Worrack (GER) | Team Specialized–lululemon | + 11" |
| 6 | Loes Gunnewijk (NED) | GreenEdge–AIS | + 14" |
| 7 | Alex Rhodes (AUS) | GreenEdge–AIS | + 14" |
| 8 | Monia Baccaille (ITA) | MCipollini–Giambenini | + 2' 30" |
| 9 | Charlotte Becker (GER) | Team Specialized–lululemon | + 2' 30" |
| 10 | Jessie MacLean (AUS) | GreenEdge–AIS | + 2' 30" |

=== Stage 2 ===
2 February 2012 – Al Zubarah to Madinat ash Shamal, 114.5 km (71.1 mi)

Straight from the start, just after noon, the pack broke up into several groups as soon as the first kilometres. Like on the previous day, a group of 11 and then 9 riders managed to power away. At km 28, the group including Van Dijk, white jersey Hosking, Worrack, Golden jersey Wild, Duster, Guderzo, Arndt, Gunnewijk and Bruins could enjoy a 28" lead over a first slim bunch of chasers. Eventually, as the riders entered the final circuit around Madinat Al Shamal, the leaders lost ground with the wind blowing sideways. At the second intermediate sprint (first passage on the line, km 78), won by Arndt ahead of Wild and Van Dijk, the gap had dropped down to 20". The leaders were finally caught at km 85 and over 40 riders were bunched together again. Despite several attempts, the pack remained together until the second passage on the line. At km 89, Worrack, Arndt, Wild and Visser managed to take off. Two kilometres later, the first two insisted and the gaps grew: 20" over Wild and Visser and 50" over the peloton. With just four kilometres left, Worrack and Arndt could enjoy a 1’15 advantage over the first two chasers and 1’35 over the pack. Victory finally went to Trixi Worrack outsprinting her day's rival and claiming her first success in Qatar while Judith Arndt captured the overall leader's Golden jersey.

Stage 2 result

| | Rider | Team | Time |
|---|---|---|---|
| 1 | Trixi Worrack (GER) | Team Specialized–lululemon | 3h 05' 37" |
| 2 | Judith Arndt (GER) | GreenEdge–AIS | + 0" |
| 3 | Adrie Visser (NED) | Skil 1t4i | + 2' 20" |
| 4 | Kirsten Wild (NED) | Netherlands | + 2' 20" |
| 5 | Shelley Olds (USA) | Team USA | + 2' 49" |
| 6 | Martine Bras (NED) | Netherlands | + 2' 51" |
| 7 | Marta Bastianelli (ITA) | MCipollini–Giambenini | + 2' 51" |
| 8 | Latoya Brulee (BEL) | Topsport Vlaanderen–Ridley | + 2' 51" |
| 9 | Jessie MacLean (AUS) | GreenEdge–AIS | + 2' 51" |
| 10 | Valentina Scandolara (ITA) | Italy | + 2' 51" |

General Classification after Stage 2

| | Rider | Team | Time |
|---|---|---|---|
| 1 | Judith Arndt (GER) | GreenEdge–AIS | 5h 22' 12" |
| 2 | Trixi Worrack (GER) | Team Specialized–lululemon | + 2" |
| 3 | Kirsten Wild (NED) | Netherlands | + 2' 16" |
| 4 | Ellen van Dijk (NED) | Gewiss–Ballan | + 2' 59" |
| 5 | Chloe Hosking (AUS) | Team Specialized–lululemon | + 3' 00" |
| 6 | Alex Rhodes (AUS) | GreenEdge–AIS | + 3' 06" |
| 7 | Loes Gunnewijk (NED) | GreenEdge–AIS | + 3' 06" |
| 8 | Jessie MacLean (AUS) | GreenEdge–AIS | + 5' 22" |
| 9 | Elena Cecchini (ITA) | MCipollini–Giambenini | + 5' 22" |
| 10 | Sarah Düster (GER) | Rabobank Women Cycling Team | + 5' 22" |

=== Stage 3 ===
3 February 2012 – Doha to Doha, 92.5 km (57.5 mi)

The third and final stage of the Ladies’ Tour of Qatar competed in windy conditions, ended in a bunched sprint. The peloton remained packed all the way to the finish at a very fast pace due to the tailwind all the way to the finish. Decision was to be made after a bunched sprint. Like on day 1, Kirsten Wild powered to victory. The Dutch rider beat her compatriots Ellen van Dijk and Adrie Visser to the line. Germany's Judith Arndt managed to keep control of her leader's Golden jersey and wins this 2012 edition of the event.

Stage 3 result

| | Rider | Team | Time |
|---|---|---|---|
| 1 | Kirsten Wild (NED) | Netherlands | 2h 38' 36" |
| 2 | Ellen van Dijk (NED) | Team Specialized–lululemon | s.t. |
| 3 | Adrie Visser (NED) | SKI | s.t. |
| 4 | Judith Arndt (GER) | GreenEdge–AIS | s.t. |
| 5 | Chloe Hosking (AUS) | Team Specialized–lululemon | s.t. |
| 6 | Giorgia Bronzini (ITA) | DPZ | s.t. |
| 7 | Monia Baccaille (ITA) | MCipollini–Giambenini | s.t. |
| 8 | Jessie MacLean (AUS) | GreenEdge–AIS | s.t. |
| 9 | Trixi Worrack (GER) | Team Specialized–lululemon | s.t. |
| 10 | Elena Cecchini (ITA) | MCipollini–Giambenini | s.t. |

General Classification after Stage 3

| | Rider | Team | Time |
|---|---|---|---|
| 1 | Judith Arndt (GER) | GreenEdge–AIS | 8h 00' 44" |
| 2 | Trixi Worrack (GER) | Team Specialized–lululemon | + 6" |
| 3 | Kirsten Wild (NED) | Netherlands | + 2' 06" |
| 4 | Ellen van Dijk (NED) | Team Specialized–lululemon | + 2' 57" |
| 5 | Chloe Hosking (AUS) | Team Specialized–lululemon | + 3' 04" |
| 6 | Loes Gunnewijk (NED) | GreenEdge–AIS | + 3' 12" |
| 7 | Alex Rhodes (AUS) | GreenEdge–AIS | + 3' 33" |
| 8 | Jessie MacLean (AUS) | GreenEdge–AIS | + 5' 26" |
| 9 | Monia Baccaille (ITA) | MCipollini–Giambenini | + 5' 26" |
| 10 | Elena Cecchini (ITA) | MCipollini–Giambenini | + 5' 26" |

== Final classifications ==
=== General classification ===
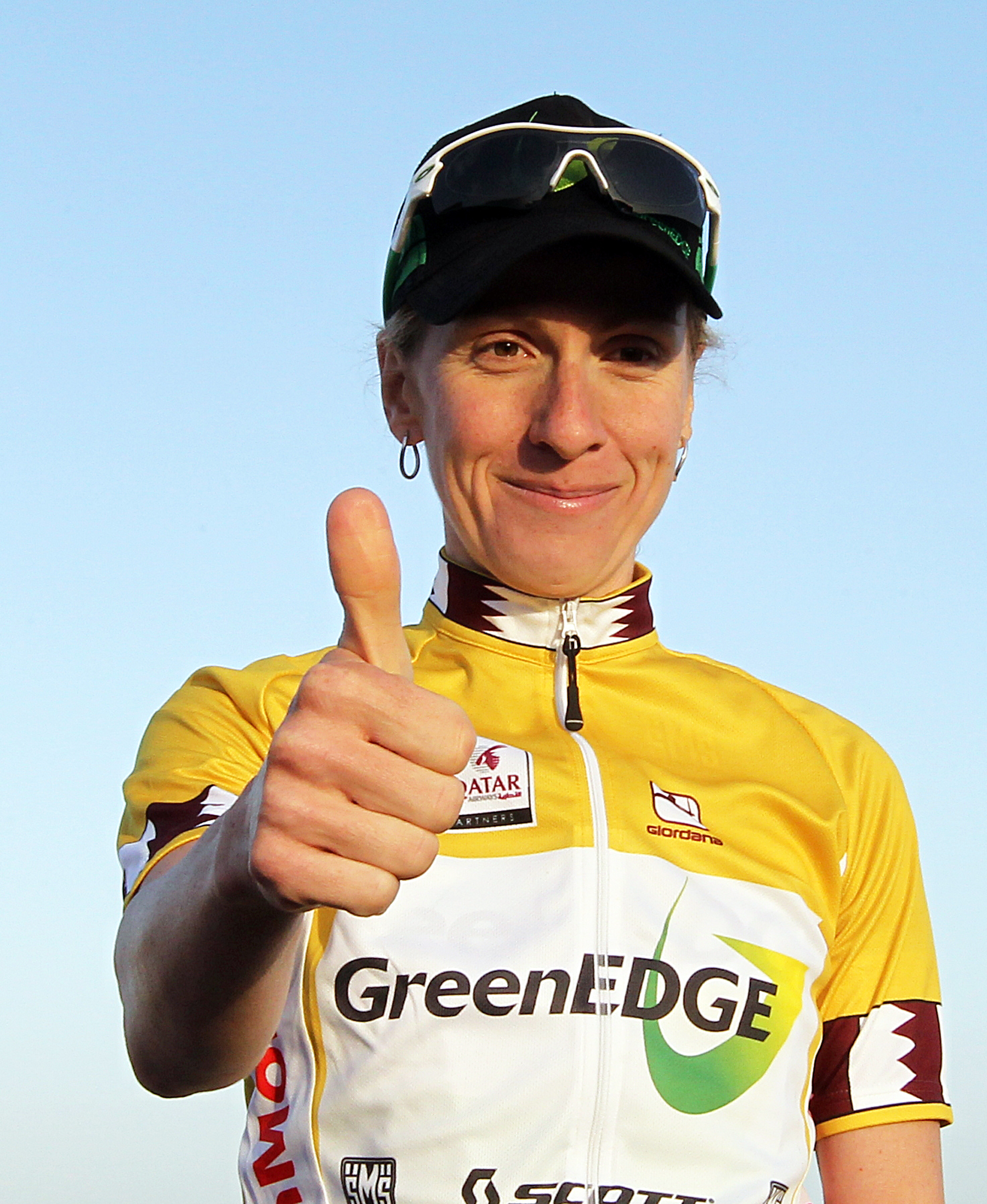
Judith Arndt won

| | Rider | Team | Time |
|---|---|---|---|
| 1 | Judith Arndt (GER) | GreenEdge–AIS | 8h 00' 44" |
| 2 | Trixi Worrack (GER) | Team Specialized–lululemon | + 6" |
| 3 | Kirsten Wild (NED) | Netherlands | + 2' 06" |
| 4 | Ellen van Dijk (NED) | Team Specialized–lululemon | + 2' 57" |
| 5 | Chloe Hosking (AUS) | Team Specialized–lululemon | + 3' 04" |
| 6 | Loes Gunnewijk (NED) | GreenEdge–AIS | + 3' 12" |
| 7 | Alex Rhodes (AUS) | GreenEdge–AIS | + 3' 33" |
| 8 | Jessie MacLean (AUS) | GreenEdge–AIS | + 5' 26" |
| 9 | Monia Baccaille (ITA) | MCipollini–Giambenini | + 5' 26" |
| 10 | Elena Cecchini (ITA) | MCipollini–Giambenini | + 5' 26" |

=== Points Classification ===
| | Rider | Team | Points |
|---|---|---|---|
| 1 | Kirsten Wild (NED) | Netherlands | 50 points |
| 2 | Judith Arndt (GER) | GreenEdge–AIS | 39 points |
| 3 | Trixi Worrack (GER) | Team Specialized–lululemon | 26 points |
| 4 | Ellen van Dijk (NED) | Team Specialized–lululemon | 25 points |
| 5 | Chloe Hosking (AUS) | Team Specialized–lululemon | 22 points |

=== Youth Classification ===
| | Rider | Team | Time |
|---|---|---|---|
| 1 | Chloe Hosking (AUS) | Team Specialized–lululemon | 8h 03' 48" |
| 2 | Elena Cecchini (ITA) | MCipollini–Giambenini | + 2' 22" |
| 3 | Dong Yan Huang (CHN) | Giant Pro Cycling | + 2' 45" |
| 4 | Marta Tagliaferro (ITA) | Mcipollini Giambenini | + 2' 57" |
| 5 | Cherise Taylor (RSA) | Lotto–Belisol Ladies | + 3' 04" |

=== Team Classification ===
| | Team | Riders | Time |
|---|---|---|---|
| 1 | Team Specialized–lululemon | Ellen van Dijk (NED); Chloe Hosking (AUS); Trixi Worrack (GER); Charlotte Becker (GER); Lisa Brennauer (GER); Katie Colclough (GBR) | 24h 08' 51" |
| 2 | GreenEdge–AIS | | + 3" |
| 3 | MCipollini–Giambenini | | + 9' 39" |

== See also ==
- 2012 in women's road cycling
