= Chloe Hosking =

Australian cyclist (born 1990)

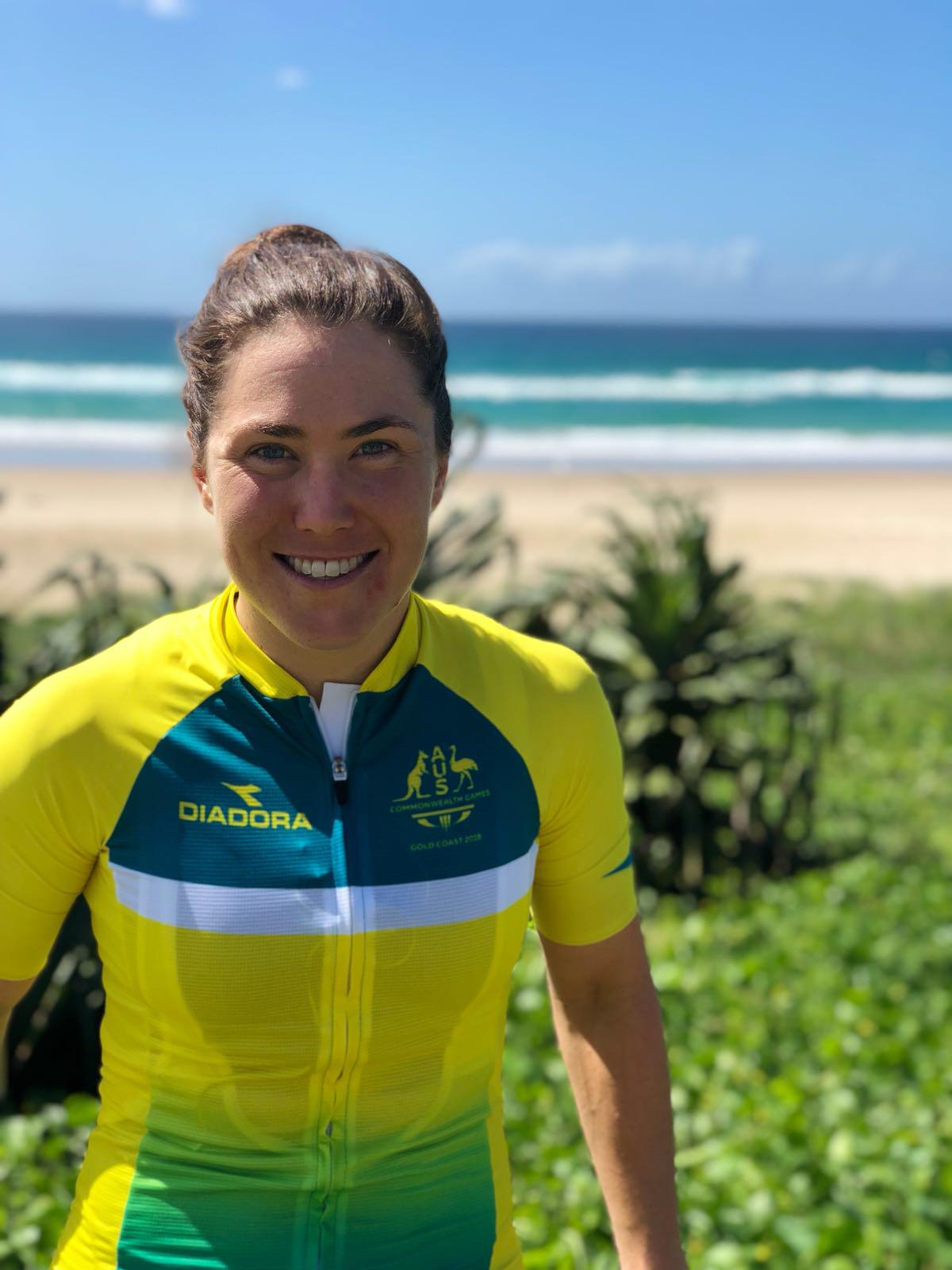
- Hosking at the 2018 Commonwealth Games

Personal information
- Born: 1 October 1990 (age 36) Bendigo, Victoria, Australia
- Height: 1.61 m (5 ft 3 in)

Cycling career
- Sport: Cycling
- Discipline: Road
- Role: Rider
- Rider type: Sprinter

Amateur teams
- 2004–2008: Canberra Cycling Club
- 2009: Moving Ladies

Professional teams
- 2010–2012: Team HTC–Columbia Women
- 2013–2014: Team Hitec Products
- 2015–2016: Wiggle–Honda
- 2017–2019: Alé–Cipollini
- 2020: Rally Cycling
- 2021–2022: Trek–Segafredo
- 2023: Roxsolt Liv SRAM

Major wins
- Australian National Criterium Championships; Madrid Challenge by La Vuelta (2019); Tour of Guangxi Women's WorldTour (2019); Stage 1 Giro d'Italia Femminile (2019); Commonwealth Games (2018); Stage 3 The Women's Tour (2017); La Course by Le Tour de France (2016); Tour of Chongming Island (2009, 2016); Drentse 8 van Dwingeloo (2012)
Medal record
Commonwealth Games
Bronze medal – third place	2010 Delhi	Road race

Chloe Hosking (born 1 October 1990) is an Australian professional racing cyclist. She holds the record for the most professional wins for an Australian woman with 39 professional wins in her career. Hosking has represented Australia at junior and then senior levels since 2007. Following success in a number of international events she turned professional in 2010. She competed at the 2012 Summer Olympics in the Women's road race, and won the women's road race at the 2018 Commonwealth Games.

== Personal life ==
=== Childhood and early life ===
Hosking was born in Bendigo, Victoria, and moved to the suburb of Campbell in the Australian Capital Territory. As a child she played field hockey and did rock climbing at a national level, however following an injury she asked her father, a keen cyclist, to help get her into cycling. She began cycling competitively in 2002 at the age of twelve, and first represented Australia in 2007 at the age of seventeen.

Hosking started as a track cyclist, but changed her focus to road racing events in 2007. She now specialises in road cycling events, being a strong sprinter and a capable climber.

Outside of cycling Hosking is a student, having completed a Bachelor of Communications degree at Griffith University specialising in journalism. Hosking is currently studying a Professional Doctorate in Law, to graduate as a Juris Doctor.

Hosking is married to Jack Lindsay.

=== HOSKING Bikes ===
Chloe Hosking is the founder of HOSKING Bikes, the first bike brand in the world founded by a female professional road racing cyclist.

== Cycling career ==
=== 2004-2009: Early years ===
Hosking competed in her first national cycling events in 2004, and began representing Australia in international events in 2007. As a junior Hosking competed for the Canberra Cycling Club, mainly riding in track cycling events and achieving considerable success, including winning the Women's Under 19 Scratch race at the 2008 Australian National Track Championships. Despite this success on the track, in 2007 she shifted her focus to road cycling events. Over the next couple of years she would become a road racing specialist, with an emphasis on sprint challenges in bunch finishes to races.

In 2008 Hosking rode for Australia in the Women's road race at the UCI Juniors Road World Championships in South Africa where she placed 37th. In 2009, she relocated to Europe to ride competitively for the Moving Ladies club in the Netherlands, and by the end of the year she had been signed by top professional team Team HTC–Columbia Women. Shortly afterwards, she was the first Team HTC–Columbia Women rider to win a 2010 event, with a victory at the Australian National Criterium Championships.

At the 2010 Commonwealth Games in Delhi, India, Hosking won the bronze medal in the Women's road race. It was revealed after the event that the Australian team of six riders was under orders to ride for a victory for Hosking in the 112-kilometre (70-mile) event in preference to veteran Australian cyclist Rochelle Gilmore, however in the final sprint for the line Gilmore came out with the gold medal ahead of English rider Lizzie Armitstead in second, leaving Hosking in third. At the end of the 2010 season Hosking was ranked 52nd in the world on the UCI elite women's rankings, and was younger than any of the riders ranked above her.

=== Professional career ===
She competed in the women's road race at the 2012 Olympic Games, but finished outside the time limit. She finished in 26th place in the road race at the 2014 Commonwealth Games.

In October 2014 Wiggle–Honda confirmed that Hosking would join them in 2015 after she had spent the previous two seasons with Team Hitec Products. Her 2015 season was shortened by a hand injury in July.

In 2018, she won the women's road race at the Commonwealth Games.

In October 2020, Hosking signed a two-year contract with the Trek–Segafredo team, from the 2021 season.

== Major results ==
2007
Oceania Junior Track Championships

2nd Sprint
3rd 500m time trial
3rd Scratch

National Junior Track Championships

3rd Keirin
3rd Scratch

4th Time trial, Oceania Junior Road Championships
2008
National Junior Track Championships

1st Scratch
3rd Points race

2009
1st Overall Tour of Chongming Island

1st Sprints classification
1st Stages 1 & 3

1st Women's International Cup
1st GP Sankomij Veldhoven
3rd Overall Bay Classic Series
3rd Sparkassen Giro Bochum
4th Grand Prix Stad Roeselare
6th Omloop van Borsele
8th Road race, Oceania Road Championships
2010
1st Under-23 race, National Criterium Championships
1st Stage 1 (TTT) Merco Cycling Classic
2nd Grand Prix Stad Roeselare
3rd Road race, Commonwealth Games
3rd Overall Nature Valley Grand Prix

1st Sprints classification
1st Stages 2 & 4

8th Sparkassen Giro
8th Omloop van Borsele
2011
1st Stage 3 Tour of Chongming Island
1st Stage 2 (TTT) Trophée d'Or Féminin
1st Stage 1 (TTT) Giro della Toscana Int. Femminile – Memorial Michela Fanini
4th Overall Holland Ladies Tour

1st Young rider classification

4th 7-Dorpenomloop Aalburg
5th Liberty Classic
6th Road race, UCI Road World Championships
9th Sparkassen Giro
10th Overall Ladies Tour of Qatar
2012
1st Drentse 8 van Dwingeloo
1st Halle-Buizingen
1st Stage 5 La Route de France
4th Tour of Chongming Island World Cup
5th Overall Ladies Tour of Qatar

1st Young rider classification

7th Novilon Eurocup
7th Grand Prix Stad Roeselare
9th Classica Citta di Padova
2013
1st Stage 5 Holland Ladies Tour
2nd Overall Ladies Tour of Qatar

1st Young rider classification
1st Stage 1

2nd Overall Tour of Chongming Island

1st Sprints classification

3rd Ronde van Gelderland
4th Ronde van Drenthe World Cup
4th EPZ Omloop van Borsele
7th Drentse 8 van Dwingeloo
7th Sparkassen Giro Bochum
2014
1st Omloop van Borsele
1st Stage 2 Bay Classic Series
3rd Overall Ladies Tour of Qatar
6th Gooik–Geraardsbergen–Gooik
8th Overall Belgium Tour

1st Stage 3

9th Drentse 8 van Dwingeloo
2015
1st Overall Bay Classic Series

1st Stage 1

1st Marianne Vos Classic
1st La Classique Morbihan
2nd Overall Ladies Tour of Qatar
2nd Novilon Eurocup Ronde van Drenthe
2nd Grand Prix de Dottignies
3rd Gent–Wevelgem
4th Le Samyn des Dames
5th Ronde van Drenthe World Cup
9th Omloop van het Hageland
2016
1st Overall Tour of Chongming Island

1st Points classification
1st Mountains classification
1st Stage 2

1st La Course by Le Tour de France
1st Gran Premio Bruno Beghelli Internazionale Donne Elite
1st Stage 3 Giro d'Italia Femminile
1st Stage 3 La Route de France
2nd Madrid Challenge by La Vuelta
4th Cadel Evans Great Ocean Road Race
6th Acht van Westerveld
7th Road race, UCI Road World Championships
7th Omloop Het Nieuwsblad
9th Overall Ladies Tour of Qatar

1st Stage 4

2017
1st Drentse Acht van Westerveld
Women's Tour Down Under

1st Sprints classification
1st Stage 3

1st Stage 3 The Women's Tour
2nd Omloop van het Hageland
2nd Grand Prix de Dottignies
3rd Overall Tour of Chongming Island

1st Points classification

6th Overall Ladies Tour of Norway

1st Stage 2

6th Crescent Vårgårda Road Race
7th Madrid Challenge by La Vuelta
8th Cadel Evans Great Ocean Road Race
10th Ronde van Drenthe
2018
1st Road race, Commonwealth Games
1st Cadel Evans Great Ocean Road Race
1st Stage 4 Women's Tour Down Under
2nd Omloop van het Hageland
2nd Three Days of Bruges–De Panne
3rd Overall Women's Herald Sun Tour

1st Points classification

3rd Drentse Acht van Westerveld
3rd Ronde van Drenthe
4th Omloop Het Nieuwsblad
4th RideLondon Classique
9th Overall Tour of Chongming Island
2019
1st Tour of Guangxi Women's WorldTour
1st Stage 4 Women's Tour Down Under
Women's Herald Sun Tour

1st Points classification
1st Stage 1

1st Stage 2 Madrid Challenge by la Vuelta
1st Stage 2 Bay Classic Series
4th Postnord UCI WWT Vårgårda West Sweden
10th Overall Giro della Toscana Int. Femminile – Memorial Michela Fanini

1st Stage 1

10th Overall Giro delle Marche in Rosa
10th Drentse Acht van Westerveld
2020
National Road Championships

1st Criterium
5th Road race

1st Overall Bay Classic Series

1st Stages 2 & 3

1st Grand Prix International d'Isbergues
1st Stage 7 Tour Cycliste Féminin International de l'Ardèche
5th Overall Women's Tour Down Under

1st Stage 1

5th Race Torquay
6th Cadel Evans Great Ocean Road Race
8th Omloop Het Nieuwsblad
2021
1st Stage 4 Ladies Tour of Norway
1st Stage 3 Tour Cycliste Féminin International de l'Ardèche
3rd Le Samyn
4th Grand Prix International d'Isbergues
4th Drentse Acht van Westerveld
7th Classic Brugge–De Panne
2022
6th Scheldeprijs
2nd Bloeizone Fryslân Tour
