= 2012 EPZ Omloop van Borsele =

Race details
- Dates: 21 April 2012
- Stages: 1
- Distance: 121.5 km (75.50 mi)
- Winning time: 3h 03' 18"

Results
	Winner	Ellen van Dijk (the Netherlands)	(Team Specialized–lululemon)
	Second	Gracie Elvin (Australia)	(Australia national team)
	Third	Sarah Düster (Germany)	(Rabobank Women Cycling Team)

News report

The 2012 EPZ Omloop van Borsele was the 11th running of the Omloop van Borsele, a women's cycling event in 's-Heerenhoek, the Netherlands. New this year was the introduction of an individual time trial, held on 20 April over a distance of 18 kilometres (11.2 miles). The road race was held on 21 April 2012 over a distance of 121.5 kilometres (75.5 miles). It was rated by the UCI as 1.2 category race.

After winning the time trial of Borsele, Team Specialized–lululemon rider Ellen van Dijk won also the road race of the EPZ Omloop van Borsele. She won the sprint of a group of seven riders ahead of Gracie Elvin from Australia (Australian national team) and Sarah Düster from Germany (Rabobank Women Cycling Team).

== Time trial ==
The individual time trial was held on 20 April over a distance of 18 kilometres (11.2 miles).

=== Results ===
	Cyclist	Team	Time
1	Ellen van Dijk (NED)	Team Specialized–lululemon	26' 21"
2	Linda Villumsen (DEN)	Orica–AIS	+ 1"
3	Clara Hughes (CAN)	Team Specialized–lululemon	+ 27"
4	Ina-Yoko Teutenberg (GER)	Team Specialized–lululemon	+ 42"
5	Loes Gunnewijk (NED)	Orica–AIS	+ 46"

== Road race ==
=== Race report ===
The race took place on a wet course on 21 April. After 25 kilometer a group of 6 riders emerged (Ellen van Dijk, Gracie Elvin, Chantal Blaak, Amy Pieters, Iris Slappendel, Megan Guarner and Melissa Hoskins). Slapendel (Rabobank Women Cycling Team) had to leave the group due to material damage. Sarah Düster was able to ride to the front group and so the Rabobank Women Cycling Team had another rider at the front. Due to good teamwork the seven riders were not pulled back by the bunch with among others the world champion Giorgia Bronzini. In the final kilometers Elvin and Düster tried both to escape but it was Van Dijk who reached first the finish line.

=== Results ===
	Cyclist	Team	Time
1	Ellen van Dijk (NED)	Team Specialized–lululemon	3h 03' 18"
2	Gracie Elvin (AUS)	Australian national team	s.t.
3	Sarah Düster (GER)	Rabobank Women Cycling Team	s.t.
4	Chantal Blaak (NED)	AA Drink–leontien.nl	s.t.
5	Amy Pieters (NED)	Skil–Argos	s.t.
6	Melissa Hoskins (AUS)	Australian national team	s.t.
7	Megan Guarnier (USA)	American national team	s.t.
8	Kirsen Wild (NED)	AA Drink–leontien.nl	+ 46"
9	Laura van der Kamp (NED)	Dolmans-Boels Cycling Team	+ 46"
10	Anastasia Chulkova (RUS)	Russian national team	+ 46"

== See also ==
- 2012 in women's road cycling
