= Grand Prix Leende =

Race details
- Region: Leende, Netherlands
- Local name(s): Grote Prijs Leende
- Discipline: Road time trial
- Competition: KNWU tijdritcompetitie
- Type: one-day race
- Web site: www.groteprijsleende.nl

History
- First edition: 2012
- Editions: 3 (as of 2014)
- First winner: (Netherlands) Loes Gunnewijk
- Most recent: (Germany) Lisa Brennauer

Grand Prix Leende or GP Leende is an elite women's road bicycle race held annually since 2012 in Leende, Netherlands. The time trial is together with the time trial at the Omloop van Borsele, part of the Dutch national time trial competition (Dutch: KNWU tijdritcompetitie).

== Past winners ==
Year	First	Second	Third
2012	(Netherlands) Loes Gunnewijk	(Netherlands) Iris Slappendel	(Netherlands) Mathilde Matthijsse
2013	(Netherlands) Ellen van Dijk	(Netherlands) Loes Gunnewijk	(Netherlands) Annemiek van Vleuten
2014	(Germany) Lisa Brennauer	(Netherlands) Ellen van Dijk	(Netherlands) Vera Koedooder
