= 2012 Belgium Tour =

2012 Lotto-Decca Tour
Race details
- Dates: 25–27 August
- Stages: 3
- Distance: 301.58 km (187.4 mi)
- Winning time: 7h 35' 02"

Results
	Winner	Ellen van Dijk (NED)	(Team Specialized–lululemon)
	Second	Liesbet De Vocht (BEL)	(Rabobank Women Cycling Team)
	Third	Lisa Brennauer (GER)	(Team Specialized–lululemon)

The 2012 Lotto–Decca Tour was the first edition of Lotto–Decca Tour, a women's cycle stage race in Belgium. The tour was held from 25 August to 27 August, 2012. The tour with an UCI rating of 2.2 started in Nijlen, and ended in Geraardsbergen. 158 cyclists started and 74 of them finished the tour.

== Stages ==
=== Stage 1 ===
25-08-2012 – Nijlen to Nijlen, 99.3 km (61.7 mi)

The first stage started at 14:00 and was scheduled to end between 16:28 and 16:38. Thestage was a flat race and consisted of one lap of 28.3 km (17.6 mi) and five laps of 14.2 km (8.8 mi). The race had four intermediate sprints. The race ended in a bunch sprint, won by Kirsten Wild ahead of Ellen van Dijk and Jolien D'Hoore.

Place	Stage 1		General Classification	
Place	Name	Time	Name	Time
1.	Kirsten Wild (NED)	2h 19' 22"	Kirsten Wild (NED)	2h 19' 22"
2.	Ellen van Dijk (NED)	+ 0"	Ellen van Dijk (NED)	+ 4"
3.	Jolien D'Hoore (BEL)	+ 0"	Jolien D'Hoore (BEL)	+ 6"

=== Stage 2 ===
26-08-2012 – Dendermonde to Dendermonde, 109.6 km (68.1 mi)

Place	Stage 2		General Classification	
Place	Name	Time	Name	Time
1.	Kirsten Wild (NED)	2h 46' 10"	Kirsten Wild (NED)	5h 05' 12"
2.	Liesbet De Vocht (BEL)	+ 0"	Liesbet De Vocht (BEL)	+ 14"
3.	Emilia Fahlin (SWE)	+ 0"	Ellen van Dijk (NED)	+ 14"

=== Stage 3 ===
27-08-2012 Geraardsbergen — Geraardsbergen, 92.68 km (57.6 mi)

Place	Stage 3		General Classification	
Place	Name	Time	Name	Time
1.	Ellen van Dijk (NED)	2h 29' 46"	Ellen van Dijk (NED)	7h 35' 02"
2.	Liesbet De Vocht (BEL)	+ 0"	Liesbet De Vocht (BEL)	+ 4"
3.	Lisa Brennauer (GER)	+ 7"	Lisa Brennauer (GER)	+ 33"

== Final standings ==
=== General Classification ===
Rank	Name	Team	Time
1.	Ellen van Dijk (NED)	Team Specialized–lululemon	7h 35' 02"
2.	Liesbet De Vocht (BEL)	Rabobank Women Cycling Team	+ 4"
3.	Lisa Brennauer (GER)	Team Specialized–lululemon	+ 33"
4.	Kirsten Wild (NED)	AA Drink–leontien.nl	+ 1' 09"
5.	Emily Collins (NZL)	MIX5	+ 1' 11"
6.	Kelly Druyts (BEL)	Topsport Vlaanderen–Ridley	+ 1' 14"
7.	Nina Kessler (NED)	Dolmans–Boels Cycling Team	+ 1' 14"
8.	Sofie De Vuyst (BEL)	Lotto Belisol Ladies	+ 1' 18"
9.	Jessie MacLean (AUS)	Australia national team	+ 1' 18"
10.	Sara Mustonen (SWE)	Hitec Products–Mistral Home	+ 1' 27"
