= 2012 Team Specialized–lululemon season =

Cycling team racing season

2012 Team Specialized–lululemon
- UCI Team ranking: 2nd
- Manager: Kristy Scrymgeour

Season victories
- One-day races: 13
- Stage race overall: 5
- Stage race stages: 25
- Best ranked rider: Evelyn Stevens (4th)

The 2012 season was the tenth for the Specialized–lululemon cycling team, which began as the T-Mobile team in 2003. After the men's team HTC–Highroad stopped, Kristy Scrymgeour convinced manufacturer Specialized and sports apparel company Lululemon Athletica to perpetuate the women's team in this Olympic year. The team changed slightly: Clara Hughes and Trixi Worrack were the main new recruits, while Judith Arndt, team leader since 2006, joined GreenEdge–AIS. The team had a great year. Ina-Yoko Teutenberg won numerous sprints and finished fourth in the road race of the Olympic Games. Evelyn Stevens had an excellent season by winning at the world cup race La Flèche Wallonne Féminine, she won a prestigious stage of the Giro d'Italia Femminile and finished on the podium in the end and she won the general classification of the La Route de France. At the end of the season she was in fourth place in the UCI World Ranking. Ellen van Dijk won the general classification of the Lotto–Decca Tour, the Omloop van Borsele and several stage races. The team dominated especially in the team time trials. Ellen van Dijk together with Stevens, Hughes, Amber Neben and Trixi Worrack or Teutenberg were consistent and undefeated the whole year. At the end of the season the team won the first team time trial at the world championship which was a main goal for the team this year. The team finished second in the UCI World Ranking.

== Roster ==
Ages as of 1 January 2012.

Rider	Date of birth
Charlotte Becker (GER)	May 19, 1983 (aged 28)
Lisa Brennauer (GER)	June 8, 1988 (aged 23)
Katie Colclough (GBR)	January 20, 1990 (aged 21)
Ellen van Dijk (NED)	February 11, 1987 (aged 24)
Emilia Fahlin (SWE)	October 24, 1988 (aged 23)
Chloe Hosking (AUS)	October 1, 1990 (aged 21)
Clara Hughes (CAN)	September 27, 1972 (aged 39)

Rider	Date of birth
Amber Neben (USA)	February 18, 1975 (aged 36)
Loren Rowney (AUS)	October 14, 1988 (aged 23)
Ally Stacher (USA)	June 8, 1987 (aged 24)
Evelyn Stevens (USA)	May 9, 1983 (aged 28)
Ina-Yoko Teutenberg (GER)	October 28, 1974 (aged 37)
Trixi Worrack (GER)	September 28, 1981 (aged 30)

Riders who joined the team for the 2012 season

Rider	2011 team
Lisa Brennauer (GER)	Hitec Products UCK
Clara Hughes (CAN)	
Loren Rowney (AUS)	Bundaberg Sugar
Trixi Worrack (GER)	AA Drink–leontien.nl

Riders who left the team during or after the 2011 season

Rider	2012 team
Judith Arndt (GER)	GreenEdge–AIS
Amanda Miller (USA)	Team TIBCO
Adrie Visser (NED)	Skil 1t4i

== Season ==
=== January – February ===
As part of the national selection Chloe Hosking and Loren Rowney started the year with success in the Jayco Bay Series in Australia in January.

The team started the season in early February in the Ladies Tour of Qatar, where Trixi Worrack finished second in the general classification after winning the second stage. Loren Rowney, riding for the American national team, won the second stage of the Women's Tour of New Zealand. Evelyn Stevens, also riding for the American national team, won the general classificationl.

=== March – April ===
In March, in the Omloop het Nieuwsblad, Ellen van Dijk rode solo to the leader in the race Loes Gunnewijk. Van Dijk lost the sprint from her and finished second. Worrack won the bunch sprint behind them. At the same time Ina-Yoko Teutenberg won the Merco Cycling Classic in the United States. A few days later, Chloe Hosking wins sprint of the Drentse 8 beating Marianne Vos and Giorgia Bronzini. In Argentina the day afterwards, Amber Neben won the time trial at the Pan American Championship which was an important step towards the Olympics.

In the Ronde van Drenthe the team did not play an important role, except for Trixi Worrack who finished fifth. Rowney won a stage in the Redlands Bicycle Classic. In the second world cup race Trofeo Alfredo Binda Evelyn Stevens chased successfully Marianne Vos, but did not see a bend and fell off her bike. Worrack finished third. In the Tour of Flanders Stevens escaped with Andrea Dvorak on the Kruisberg, but at the foot of the old Kwaremont, two former members of the team, Judith Arndt and Kristin Armstrong were able to pull them back and rode away in the ascent. Ultimately Ellen van Dijk took the sixth place in the sprint of the chasing group.

The team rode very well in the Energiewacht Tour. Clara Hughes finished second in the first stage, an individual time trial. Ina Teutenberg won the second and third stage and the team won stage 4a, a team time trial. Overall Teutenberg won the general classification with Ellen van Dijk in second place. In mid April Hosking won in a sprint Halle-Buizingen.

Evelyn Stevens booked the first major victory of the season in the Fleche Wallone World Cup race. She beat Marianne Vos on the line who won the four previous World Cup races. She took profit of the strategy of her team. Clara Huges was in an early breakaway and the Rabobank Women Cycling Team had to chase her. On the last climb, on top of the Mur de Hoy, Stevens was able to beat Vos.

=== End of April – May ===
Ellen van Dijk won the time trial of the Omloop van Borsele, Hughes finished third and Teutenberg fourth. The day afterwards Van Dijk won also the road race of the Omloop van Borsele. At the Gracia–Orlová the team showed again its superiority in the time trial. Ellen van Dijk won the prologue, with Trixi Worrack, Evelyn Stevens and Katie Colclough finishing second, fourth and sixth. Two days later Van Dijk also won the time trial, two seconds ahead of Stevens. The team dominated the stage race and won all the stages, and Ellen van Dijk won the general classification. At the time trial of the Chrono Gatineau the team had a podium sweep. Hughes won ahead of Stevens and Neben and Teutenberg took the fifth place. Teutenberg later on won the road race in Gatineau.

The fifth World Cup Race, the Tour of Chongming Island, ended like the other years in a bunch sprint where Hosking finished fourth. The team performed really well in The Exergy Tour. Amber Neben won the second stage, an individual time trial and Teutenberg the queen stage. Neben, Stevens and Hughes finished first, second and third in the general classification and besides of that the team won the points, mountain and team classification.

The team was really confident with the results in the first half of the season.

=== June ===
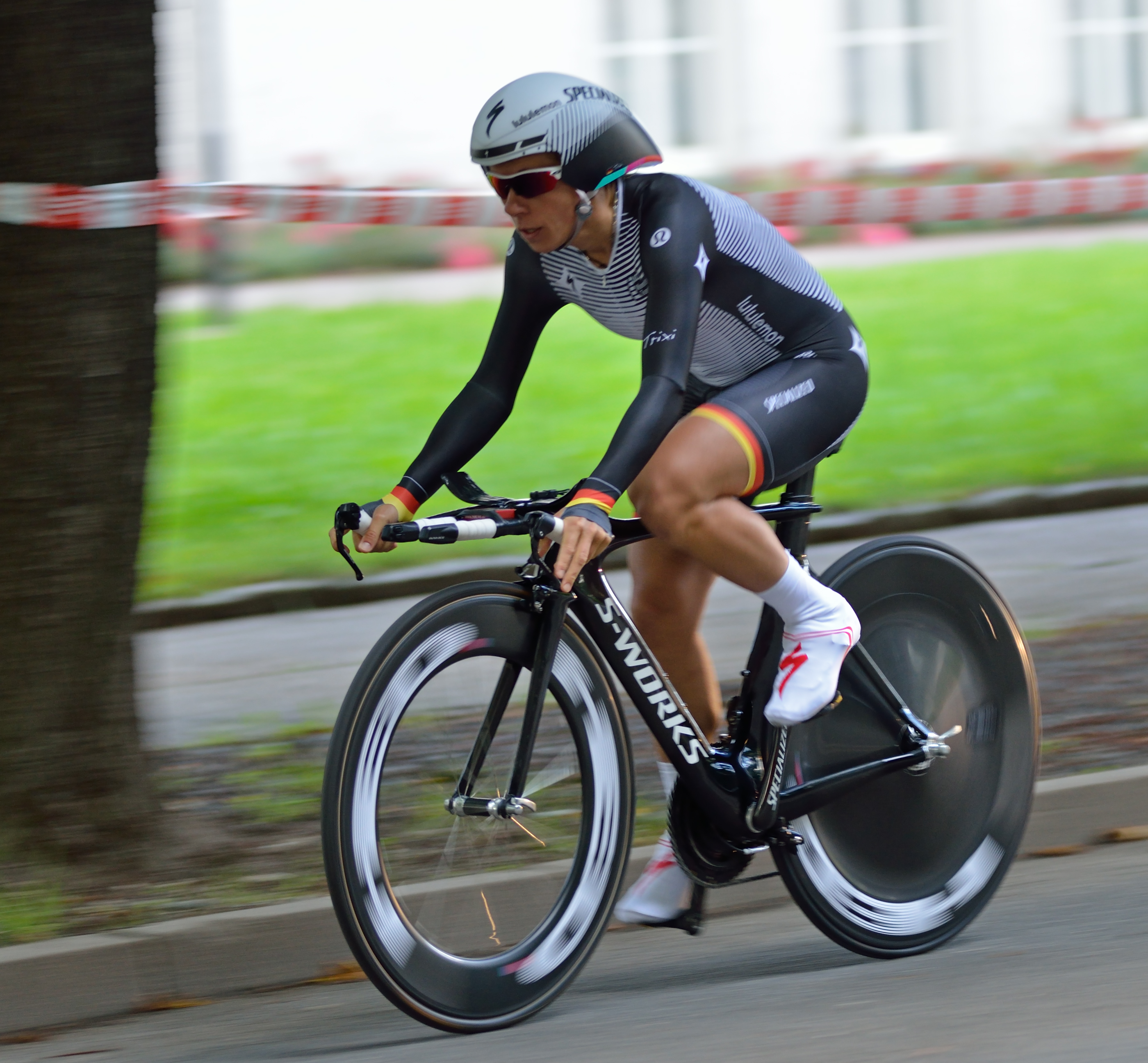
Trixi Worrack finished second in the Thüringen Rundfahrt der Frauen

Ina Teutenberg won the sprint of the first stage of the Emakumeen Euskal Bira.

At the national championships, Ellen van Dijk won the 2012 Dutch Time Trial Championships and Clara Hughes won the title in Canada. In Germany Worrack, Teutenberg and Becker finished respectively second, third and fourth at the German time trial championships behind winner Judith Arndt. In the road race Becker finished second and Worrack third over twelve minutes behind Arndt. Finally in the United States, Amber Neben won the time trial one second ahead of teammate Evelyn Stevens. So they switched positions compared to the 2011 edition.

=== July ===
Evelyn Stevens won the third stage of the Giro d'Italia Femminile, and took the pink leaders jersey. However, Marianne Vos dominated the stage race by winning five stages and the general classification. Stevens was second in the general classification until the last stage. Due to a mistake she lost some time and finished in the end third behind Emma Pooley.

Teutenberg won the first two stages of the Thüringen Rundfahrt der Frauen. Trixi Worrack won the third and fourth stage. The one second margin in the time trial of stage 4 between Worrack and Arndt was not enough to win the overall classification and so Worrack finished second overall.

=== Olympic Games (end July, begin August) ===
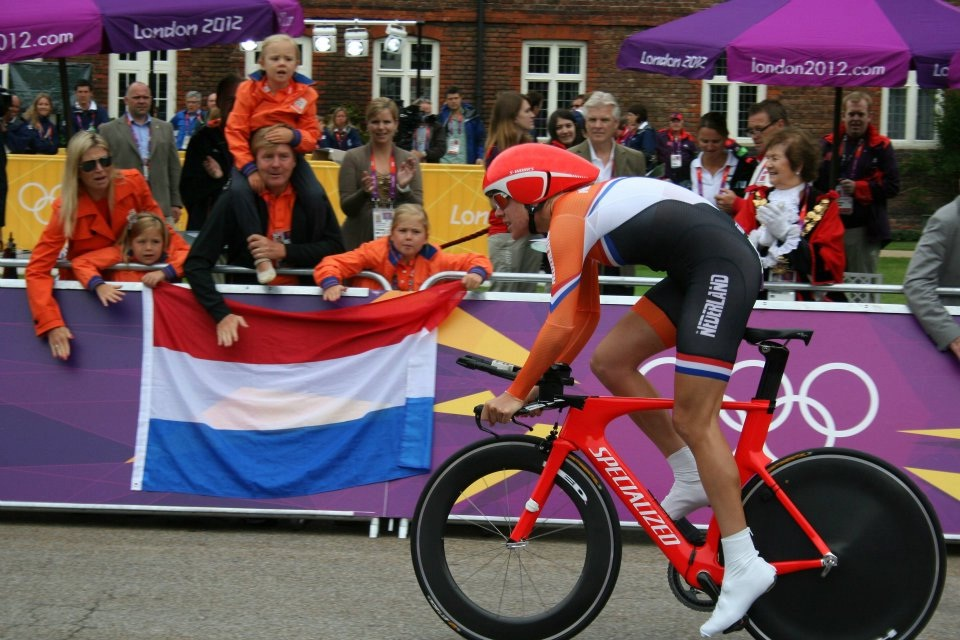
Ellen van Dijk riding the time trial at the 2012 Summer Olympics supporters by the Dutch Royalties

Eight members of the team participated at the 2012 Summer Olympics : Chloe Hosking, Clara Hughes, Ina Teutenberg, Trixi Worrack, Ellen van Dijk, Emilia Fahlin, Amber Neben and Evelyn Stevens. They participated in the individual time trial and the road race with their national selection. Ellen van Dijk also participated on the track. In the time trial, Clara Hughes finished 5th, Amber Neben 7th, Ellen van Dijk 8th and Trixi Worrack 9th. In the road race Ina Teutenberg won the bunchsprint and finished in 4th place. Ellen van Dijk helped Marianne Vos winning the gold medal and attacked multiple times during the race. Evelyn Stevens also attacked once during the race. Ellen van Dijk participated on the track in the team pursuit. She rode with the Dutch team a national record in the first round and finished in 6th place.

=== August ===
Hosking won the fifth stage of La Route de France and Rowney the sixth. The day afterwards Evelyn Stevens won with a large margin on the Planche des Belles Filles and took the leaders jersey. She also won the ninth stage and the overall general classification.

At the Open de Suède Vårgårda TTT world cup race, Team Specialized–lululemon won the team time trial with the squad: Stevens, Teutenberg, Worrack, Neben, van Dijk and Becker. In the road race of the Open de Suède Vårgårda, Trixi Worrack finished fifth.

At the end of August Ellen van Dijk won the last stage in Geraardsbergen and the general classification of the Lotto–Decca Tour, also known as the Tour of Belgium. Stevens finishes fifth in the world cup race GP de Plouay.

=== September: Holland Ladies Tour and World Championships ===
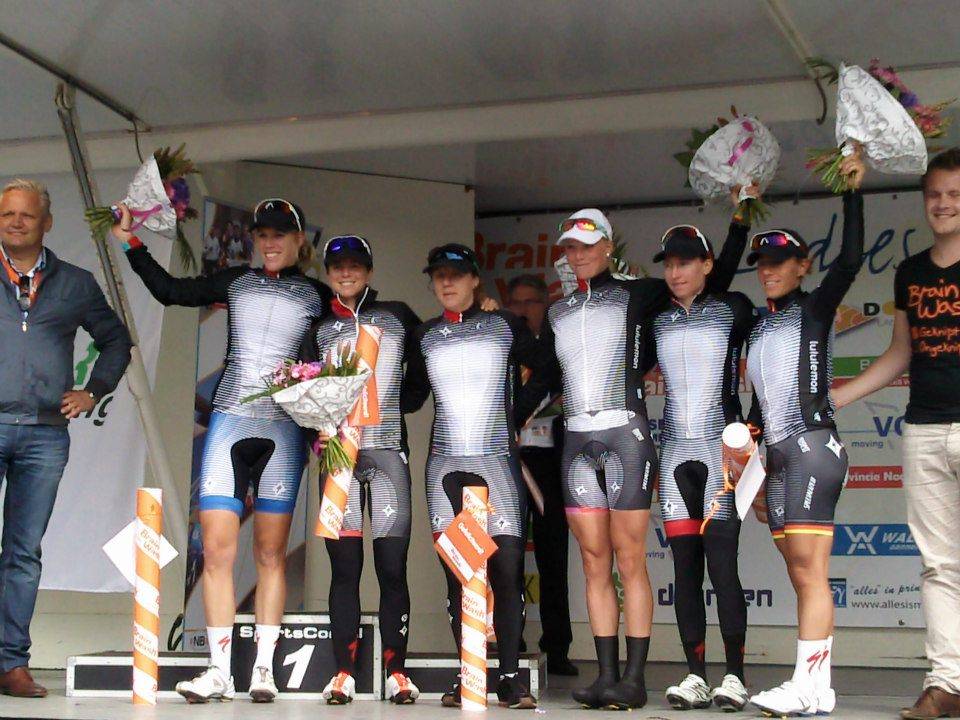
The team won the team time trial in the Brainwash Ladies Tour. From left to right: Van Dijk, Stevens, Teutenberg, Becker, Neben et Worrack

Two weeks before the 2012 UCI Road World Championships the team won the team time trial stage of the Holland Ladies Tour with the squad: Van Dijk, Becker, Stevens, Worrack and Teutenberg. Worrack also won a stage in the same tour a few days afterwards.

The team won the team time trial at the World Championships with a 24 seconds gap over Green-Edge with Judith Arndt and Linda Villumsen who were part of the team for two years. The squad of the team was: Neben, Stevens, Van Dijk, Becker, Worrack and Teutenberg. And so the team was undefeated in the Team Time Trial in 2012. At the individual time trial at the World Championships, Evelyn Stevens won the silver medal, Ellen van Dijk finished in fifth place, Teutenberg finished sixth, Neben seventh and Worrack eighth. The team was less successful in the road race at the World Championships. Ellen van Dijk was involved in a large crash. After cycling a few laps on her own, she could not reach the bunch again and had to abandon the race. Amber Neben was the most successful rider finishing in fourth place. All the other riders finished somewhere in the back.

== Results ==
=== Season victories ===
Single day and stage races 2012
Date	Nation	Race	Cat.	Winner
2 February	Qatar	Stage 2 Ladies Tour of Qatar	2.1	(Germany) Trixi Worrack
8 Mars	Netherlands	Drentse 8	1.1	(Australia) Chloe Hosking
5 April	Netherlands	Stage 2 Energiewacht Tour	2.2	(Germany) Ina-Yoko Teutenberg
6 April	Netherlands	Stage 3 Energiewacht Tour	2.2	(Germany) Ina-Yoko Teutenberg
7 April	Netherlands	Stage 4b Energiewacht Tour	2.2	Team Specialized–lululemon
8 April	Netherlands	General Classification Energiewacht Tour	2.2	(Germany) Ina-Yoko Teutenberg
15 April	Belgium	Halle-Buizingen	1.2	(Australia) Chloe Hosking
18 April	Belgium	La Flèche Wallonne Féminine	CDM	(United States) Evelyn Stevens
21 April	Netherlands	Omloop van Borsele	1.2	(Netherlands) Ellen van Dijk
25 April	Czech Republic	Prologue Gracia–Orlová	2.2	(Netherlands) Ellen van Dijk
26 April	Czech Republic	Stage 1 Gracia–Orlová	2.2	(United States) Evelyn Stevens
27 April	Czech Republic	Stage 2 Gracia–Orlová	2.2	(Netherlands) Ellen van Dijk
28 April	Czech Republic	Stage 3 Gracia–Orlová	2.2	(Germany) Trixi Worrack
29 April	Czech Republic	Stage 4 Gracia–Orlová	2.2	(United Kingdom) Katie Colclough
29 April	Czech Republic	General classification Gracia–Orlová	2.2	(United States) Evelyn Stevens
19 May	Canada	Chrono Gatineau	1.1	(Canada) Clara Hughes
21 May	Canada	Grand Prix Cycliste de Gatineau	1.1	(Germany) Ina-Yoko Teutenberg
26 May	United States	Stage 2 The Exergy Tour	2.1	(United States) Amber Neben
27 May	United States	Stage 3 The Exergy Tour	2.1	(Germany) Ina-Yoko Teutenberg
28 May	United States	General classification The Exergy Tour	2.1	(United States) Evelyn Stevens
3 June	United States	Liberty Classic	1.1	(Germany) Ina-Yoko Teutenberg
7 June	Spain	Stage 1 Emakumeen Euskal Bira	2.1	(Germany) Ina-Yoko Teutenberg
1 July	Italy	Stage 3 Giro d'Italia Femminile	2.1	(United States) Evelyn Stevens
17 July	Germany	Stage 1 Thüringen Rundfahrt der Frauen	2.1	(Germany) Ina-Yoko Teutenberg
18 July	Germany	Stage 2 Thüringen Rundfahrt der Frauen	2.1	(Germany) Ina-Yoko Teutenberg
19 July	Germany	Stage 3 Thüringen Rundfahrt der Frauen	2.1	(Germany) Trixi Worrack
20 July	Germany	Stage 4 Thüringen Rundfahrt der Frauen	2.1	(Germany) Trixi Worrack
8 August	France	Stage 5 La Route de France	2.1	(Australia) Chloe Hosking
9 August	France	Stage 6 La Route de France	2.1	(Australia) Loren Rowney
10 August	France	Stage 7 La Route de France	2.1	(United States) Evelyn Stevens
12 August	France	Stage 9 La Route de France	2.1	(United States) Evelyn Stevens
12 August	France	General classification La Route de France	2.1	(United States) Evelyn Stevens
17 August	Sweden	Open de Suède Vårgårda TTT	CDM	Specialized–lululemon
27 August	Belgium	Stage 3 Lotto–Decca Tour	2.2	(Netherlands) Ellen van Dijk
27 August	Belgium	Classement classification Lotto–Decca Tour	2.2	(Netherlands) Ellen van Dijk
4 September	Netherlands	Stage 1 BrainWash Ladies Tour	2.1	(Germany) Ina-Yoko Teutenberg
5 September	Netherlands	Stage 2 BrainWash Ladies Tour	2.1	Specialized–lululemon
8 September	Netherlands	Stage 5 BrainWash Ladies Tour	2.1	(Germany) Ina-Yoko Teutenberg

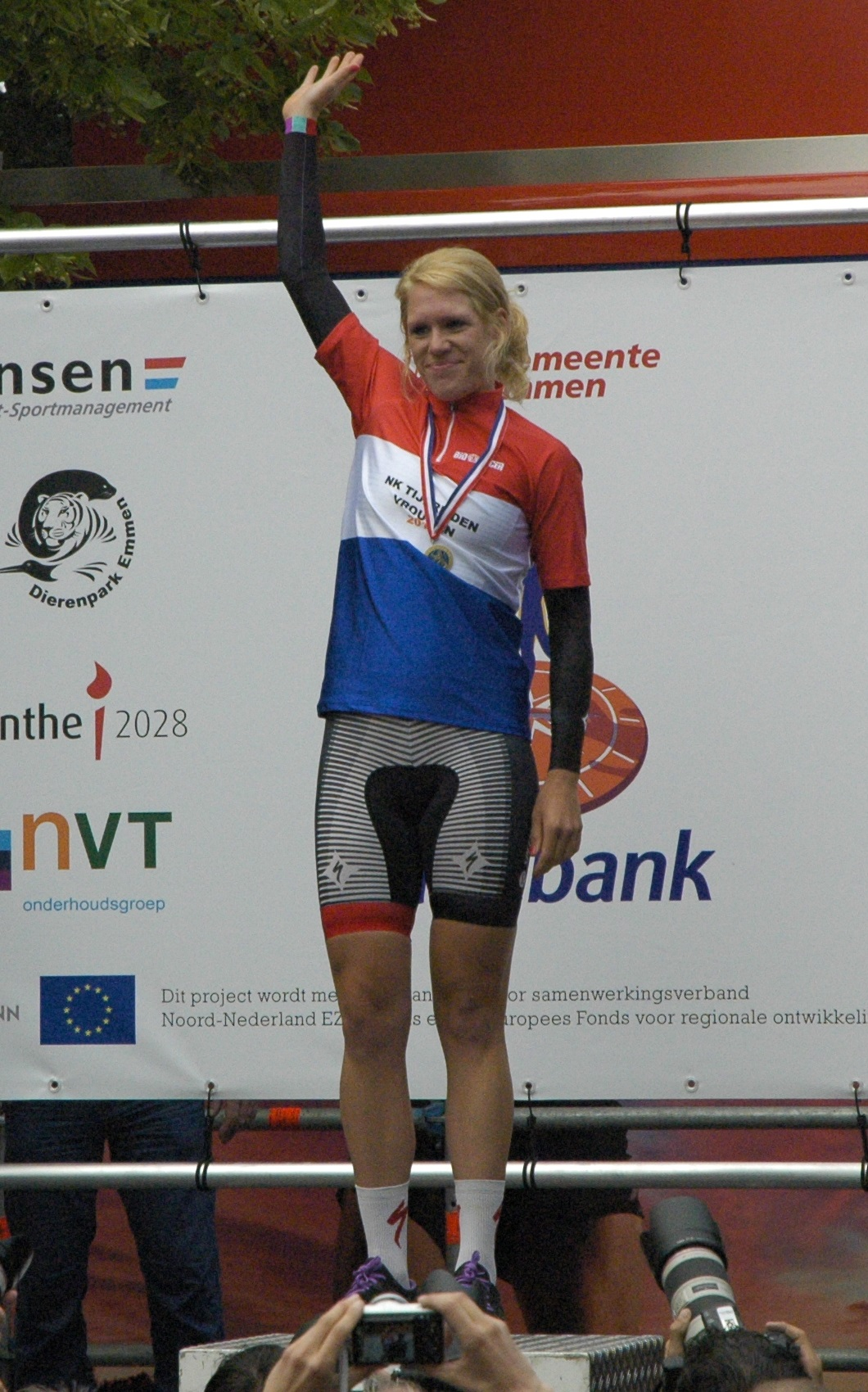
Dutch National Time Trial Champion Ellen van Dijk

National, Continental and World champions 2012
Date	Discipline	Jersey	Winner
9 mars	Pan American Championships		(United States) Amber Neben
20 June	Dutch National Time Trial Championships		Ellen van Dijk
21 June	United States National Road Race Championships		Amber Neben
21 June	Canadian National Road Race Championships		Clara Hughes
16 September	Team Time Trial World Champion		Specialized–lululemon

== Results in major races ==
=== Single day races ===
At the 2012 UCI Women's Road World Cup, Evelyn Stevens finished 3rd in the final classification and Trixi Worrack 4th. The team finished 3rd in the teams standing.

Results at the World Cup races
Date	#	Race	Best rider	Place
10 March	1	Ronde van Drenthe	(Germany) Trixi Worrack	5th
25 March	2	Trofeo Alfredo Binda-Comune di Cittiglio	(Germany) Trixi Worrack	3rd
1 April	3	Tour of Flanders	(Netherlands) Ellen van Dijk	6th
18 April	4	La Flèche Wallonne Féminine	(United States) Evelyn Stevens	1st
13 May	5	Tour of Chongming Island	(United States) Chloe Hosking	4th
17 August	6	Open de Suède Vårgårda TTT	Team Specialized–lululemon	1st
19 August	7	Open de Suède Vårgårda	(Germany) Trixi Worrack	5th
25 August	8	GP de Plouay	(United States) Evelyn Stevens	5th
Final individual classification			(United States) Evelyn Stevens	4th
Final team classification			Team Specialized–lululemon	3rd

UCI Road World Championships
Date	Race	Place
16 September	UCI Road World Championships – Women's team time trial	1st

=== Grand Tours ===
Results of the team in the grand tours
Grand tour	Giro d'Italia Femminile
Rider (classification)	Evelyn Stevens (3rd)
Victories	1 stage win

== Other achievements ==
=== Dutch national record, team pursuit ===
Ellen van Dijk, as part of the national team, broke together with Kirsten Wild and Vera Koedooder the Dutch team pursuit record at the 2012 Summer Olympics.

Time	Speed (km/h)	Cyclists	Event	Location of race	Date	Ref
3:20.013	53.996	Ellen van Dijk (Note: As part of the national selection) (with Kirsten Wild and Vera Koedooder)	2012 Summer Olympics (first round)	(United Kingdom) London	4 August 2012	

== UCI World Ranking ==
The team finished second in the UCI ranking for teams.

Individual UCI World Ranking
Rank	Rider	Points
4	(United States) Evelyn Stevens	825
5	(United States) Amber Neben	574
6	(Germany) Ina-Yoko Teutenberg	563
8	(Germany) Trixi Worrack	512
19	(Netherlands) Ellen van Dijk	317
24	(Australia) Chloe Hosking	262
27	(Canada) Clara Hughes	232
46	(Netherlands) Charlotte Becker	149
123	(Sweden) Emilia Fahlin	41
139	(Germany) Lisa Brennauer	32
152	(Australia) Loren Rowney	26
231	(United Kingdom) Katie Colclough	11
