= 2012 Energiewacht Tour =

Race details
- Dates: 4–8 April 2012
- Stages: 6
- Distance: 433.4 km (269.3 mi)
- Winning time: 11h 24' 45"

Results
	Winner	Ina-Yoko Teutenberg (Germany)	(Team Specialized–lululemon)
	Second	Ellen van Dijk (Netherlands)	(Team Specialized–lululemon)
	Third	Marianne Vos (Netherlands)	(Rabobank Women Cycling Team)
	Points	Ina-Yoko Teutenberg (Germany)	(Team Specialized–lululemon)
	Youth	Amy Pieters (Netherlands)	(Skil–Argos)
	Team	Team Specialized–lululemon	

The 2012 Energiewacht Tour was the second edition of the Energiewacht Tour women's cycling stage race. It was rated by the UCI as category 2.2, and was held between 4 and 8 April 2012 in the Netherlands.

The tour was won by Ina-Yoko Teutenberg ahead of Ellen van Dijk and Marianne Vos.

== Stages ==
=== Stage 1 ===
4 April 2012 – Appingedam to Appingedam (individual time trial), 15.3 km (9.5 mi)

It was really cold for the time of the year. The individual time trial was, unsurprisingly, dominated by time trial specialists.

Stage 1 result

	Rider	Team	Time
1	Kristin Armstrong (USA)	American national team	19' 42"
2	Clara Hughes (CAN)	Team Specialized–lululemon	+ 10"
3	Marianne Vos (NED)	Rabobank Women Cycling Team	+ 13"
4	Ellen van Dijk (NED)	Team Specialized–lululemon	+ 25"
5	Judith Arndt (GER)	Orica–AIS	+ 27"

General classification after stage 1

	Rider	Team	Time
1	Kristin Armstrong (USA)	American national team	19' 42"
2	Clara Hughes (CAN)	Team Specialized–lululemon	+ 10"
3	Marianne Vos (NED)	Rabobank Women Cycling Team	+ 13"
4	Ellen van Dijk (NED)	Team Specialized–lululemon	+ 25"
5	Judith Arndt (GER)	Orica–AIS	+ 27"

=== Stage 2 ===
5 April 2012 – Bad Nieuweschans to Bad Nieuweschans, 107.3 km (66.7 mi)

Stage 2 started with the peloton being held up behind a level-crossing. The pace was kept high, with Rabobank doing a lot of work. Although various groups and riders had tried to escape from the pack, it was not until the end of the penultimate lap that a group could stay away. 22 riders including four each from Team Specialized–lululemon and Rabobank, three each from AA Drink–leontien.nl, GreenEdge and Skil–Argos – but neither of the top 2 in the general classification, Kristin Armstrong and Clara Hughes. Armstrong's Team USA tried hard to pull the group back, but with that group working together, they had no chance. The front group finished 3' 44" ahead of the chasers and coming down to a bunch sprint, won by Ina-Yoko Teutenberg. Vos' intermediate sprints and stage placings took her into the lead for the general classification.

Stage 2 result

	Rider	Team	Time
1	Ina-Yoko Teutenberg (GER)	Team Specialized–lululemon	2h 35' 50"
2	Kirsten Wild (NED)	AA Drink–leontien.nl	s.t.
3	Marianne Vos (NED)	Rabobank Women Cycling Team	s.t.
4	Adrie Visser (NED)	Skil–Argos	s.t.
5	Elizabeth Armitstead (GBR)	AA Drink–leontien.nl	s.t.

General classification after stage 2

	Rider	Team	Time
1	Marianne Vos (NED)	Rabobank Women Cycling Team	2h 55' 35"
2	Ellen van Dijk (NED)	Team Specialized–lululemon	+ 22"
3	Ina-Yoko Teutenberg (GER)	Team Specialized–lululemon	+ 30"
4	Loes Gunnewijk (NED)	Orica–AIS	+ 47"
5	Shara Gillow (AUS)	Orica–AIS	+ 59"

=== Stage 3 ===
6 April 2012 – Midwolda to Midwolda, 110.4 km (68.6 mi)

The third was six laps around a lake and it started with sunshine. There were attacks from the start, although they were neutralised in time for Vos to take the early sprint points then a break of about twenty riders. They were caught, and Vos took more points. Later a break group got away with some serious threats like Kirsten Wild, Chantal Blaak and Lizzie Armitstead (AA Drink–leontien.nl) and Judith Arndt (GreenEdge) but not a single Rabobank rider, and none of the big Specialized–lululemon general classificatn threats. Marianne Vos was on the front, pulling back the break, and Rabo got in some practice for the next day's team time trial. The break tried their best, but were caught and Specialized–lululemon took their turn on the front, with a huge pull from Ellen van Dijk stretched out the peloton, and trains started to form on both sides of the road but once again, Ina-Yoko Teutenberg took the bunch sprint.

Stage 3 result

	Rider	Team	Time
1	Ina-Yoko Teutenberg (GER)	Team Specialized–lululemon	2h 41' 09"
2	Marianne Vos (NED)	Rabobank Women Cycling Team	s.t.
3	Kirsten Wild (NED)	AA Drink–leontien.nl	s.t.
4	Laura van der Kamp (NED)	Dolmans-Boels Cycling Team	s.t.
5	Evelyn Arys (BEL)	Belgium national team	s.t.

General classification after stage 3

	Rider	Team	Time
1	Marianne Vos (NED)	Rabobank Women Cycling Team	5h 36' 32"
2	Ina-Yoko Teutenberg (GER)	Team Specialized–lululemon	+ 32"
3	Ellen van Dijk (NED)	Team Specialized–lululemon	+ 33"
4	Loes Gunnewijk (NED)	Orica–AIS	+ 57"
5	Shara Gillow (AUS)	Orica–AIS	+ 1' 11"

=== Stage 4a ===
7 April 2012 – Winsum to Winsum, 71 km (44.1 mi)

Stage 4a result

	Rider	Team	Time
1	Kirsten Wild (NED)	AA Drink–leontien.nl	1h 42' 25"
2	Ina-Yoko Teutenberg (GER)	Team Specialized–lululemon	+ 7"
3	Marianne Vos (NED)	Rabobank Women Cycling Team	+ 7"
4	Judith Arndt (GER)	Orica–AIS	+ 7"
5	Ellen van Dijk (NED)	Team Specialized–lululemon	+ 7"

General classification after stage 4a

	Rider	Team	Time
1	Marianne Vos (NED)	Rabobank Women Cycling Team	7h 18' 59"
2	Ina-Yoko Teutenberg (GER)	Team Specialized–lululemon	+ 31"
3	Ellen van Dijk (NED)	Team Specialized–lululemon	+ 38"
4	Loes Gunnewijk (NED)	Orica–AIS	+ 1' 01"
5	Kirsten Wild (NED)	AA Drink–leontien.nl	+ 1' 18"

=== Stage 4b ===
7 April 2012 – Veendam to Oude Pekela (Team Time Trial, 26.5 km (16.5 mi)

Stage 4b result

	Team	Riders	Time
1	Team Specialized–lululemon	Ellen van Dijk (NED); Ina-Yoko Teutenberg (GER); Evelyn Stevens (USA); Trixi Worrack (GER)	35' 51"
2	Orica–AIS	Judith Arndt (GER); Loes Gunnewijk (NED); Shara Gillow (AUS); Alexis Rhodes (AUS)	+ 40"
3	Rabobank Women Cycling Team	Marianne Vos (NED); Tatiana Antoshina (RUS); Iris Slappendel (NED); Annemiek van Vleuten (NED)	+ 1' 14'
4	AA Drink–leontien.nl		+ 1' 47"
5	RusVelo		+ 2' 01"

General classification after stage 4b

	Rider	Team	Time
1	Ina-Yoko Teutenberg (GER)	Team Specialized–lululemon	7h 55' 21"
2	Ellen van Dijk (NED)	Team Specialized–lululemon	+ 7"
3	Marianne Vos (NED)	Rabobank Women Cycling Team	+ 43"
4	Trixi Worrack (GER)	Team Specialized–lululemon	+ 50"
5	Loes Gunnewijk (NED)	Orica–AIS	+ 1' 10"

=== Stage 5 ===
8 April 2012 – Slochteren to Slochteren, 102.9 km (63.9 mi)

Stage 5 result

	Rider	Team	Time
1	Nicole Cooke (GBR)	Faren-Honda Team	3h 27' 05"
2	Evelyn Arys (BEL)	Belgium national team	+ 2"
3	Sarah Düster (GER)	Rabobank Women Cycling Team	+ 2"
4	Megan Guarnier (USA)	Team TIBCO–To The Top	+ 2"
5	Marieke van Wanroij (NED)	AA Drink–leontien.nl	+ 2"

General classification after stage 5

	Rider	Team	Time
1	Ina-Yoko Teutenberg (GER)	Team Specialized–lululemon	11h 24' 45"
2	Ellen van Dijk (NED)	Team Specialized–lululemon	+ 7"
3	Marianne Vos (NED)	Rabobank Women Cycling Team	+ 43"
4	Trixi Worrack (GER)	Team Specialized–lululemon	+ 50"
5	Loes Gunnewijk (NED)	Orica–AIS	+ 1' 10"

== Final classifications ==
=== General classification ===
	Rider	Team	Time
1	Ina-Yoko Teutenberg (GER)	Team Specialized–lululemon	11h 24' 45"
2	Ellen van Dijk (NED)	Team Specialized–lululemon	+ 7"
3	Marianne Vos (NED)	Rabobank Women Cycling Team	+ 43"
4	Trixi Worrack (GER)	Team Specialized–lululemon	+ 50"
5	Loes Gunnewijk (NED)	Orica–AIS	+ 1' 10"
6	Iris Slappendel (NED)	Rabobank Women Cycling Team	+ 2' 29"
7	Kirsten Wild (NED)	AA Drink–leontien.nl	+ 2' 34"
8	Chantal Blaak (NED)	AA Drink–leontien.nl	+ 3' 14"
9	Romy Kasper (GER)	GreenEdge–AIS	+ 4' 16"
10	Judith Arndt (GER)	RusVelo	+ 4' 34"

=== Points classification ===
	Rider	Team	Points
1	Ina-Yoko Teutenberg (GER)	Team Specialized–lululemon	75 points
2	Kirsten Wild (NED)	AA Drink–leontien.nl	61 points
3	Marianne Vos (NED)	Rabobank Women Cycling Team	60 points
4	Evelyn Arys (BEL)	Belgium national team	36 points
5	Adrie Visser (NED)	Skil–Argos	32 points
6	Ellen van Dijk (NED)	Team Specialized–lululemon	28 points
7	Romy Kasper (GER)	RusVelo	27 points
8	Nicole Cooke (GBR)	Faren-Honda Team	25 points
9	Laura van der Kamp (NED)	Dolmans-Boels Cycling Team	24 points
10	Judith Arndt (GER)	Orica–AIS	20 points

=== Youth classification ===
	Rider	Team	Time
1	Amy Pieters (NED)	Skil–Argos	11h 40' 14"
2	Laura van der Kamp (NED)	Dolmans-Boels Cycling Team	+ 16"
3	Lauren Kitchen (AUS)	Rabobank Women Cycling Team	+ 1' 59"
4	Evelyn Arys (BEL)	Belgium national team	+ 2' 12"
5	Denise Ramsden (CAN)	Canada national team	+ 2' 16"

== See also ==
- 2012 in women's road cycling
