= 2014 Gooik–Geraardsbergen–Gooik =

Race details
- Dates: 1 June 2014
- Stages: 1

The 2014 Gooik–Geraardsbergen–Gooik is a one-day women's cycle race held in Belgium starting and finishing in Gooik on 1 June 2014. The race had a UCI rating of 1.1.

== Results ==
	Rider	Team	Time
1	Marianne Vos (NED)	Rabobank-Liv Woman Cycling Team	3h 41' 40"
2	Emma Johansson (SWE)	Orica–AIS	s.t.
3	Elisa Longo Borghini (ITA)	Hitec Products	s.t.
4	Loes Gunnewijk (NED)	Orica–AIS	+ 8"
5	Ashleigh Moolman (RSA)	Hitec Products	+ 26"
6	Chloe Hosking (AUS)	Hitec Products	+ 28"
7	Kelly Druyts (BEL)	Topsport Vlaanderen–Pro-Duo	+ 28"
8	Liesbet De Vocht (BEL)	Lotto–Belisol Ladies	+ 28"
9	Christine Majerus (LUX)	Boels–Dolmans	+ 28"
10	Amy Pieters (NED)	Team Giant–Shimano	+ 28"

== See also ==
- 2014 in women's road cycling
