= Alex Rhodes =

Alex Rhodes may refer to:

- Alex Rhodes (footballer) (born 1982), English footballer
- Alex Rhodes (cyclist) (born 1984), Australian cyclist
