= 2011 Omloop Het Nieuwsblad (women's race) =

Race details
- Dates: 26 February 2011
- Stages: 1
- Distance: 127.2 km (79.0 mi)
- Winning time: 3h 38' 05"

Results
	Winner	Emma Johansson (SWE)	(Hitec Products UCK)
	Second	Andrea Bosman (NED)	
	Third	Chantal van den Broek-Blaak (NED)	(AA Drink–leontien.nl)

The 2011 Omloop Het Nieuwsblad was the 6th edition of the women's Omloop Het Nieuwsblad road cycling one-day race, which was held on 26 February.

The race was won by Swedish rider Emma Johansson ahead of Andrea Bosman and Chantal van den Broek-Blaak.

== Results ==
Final general classification
Rank	Rider	Team	Time
1	Emma Johansson (SWE)	Hitec Products UCK	3h 38' 05"
2	Andrea Bosman (NED)	-	+ 0"
3	Chantal van den Broek-Blaak (NED)	AA Drink–leontien.nl	+ 0"
4	Loes Gunnewijk (NED)	Nederland bloeit	+ 0"
5	Elisa Longo Borghini (ITA)	Top Girls–Fassa Bortolo	+ 4"
6	Annemiek van Vleuten (NED)	Nederland bloeit	+ 1' 39"
7	Janneke Busser (NED)	Nederland bloeit	+ 1' 39"
8	Tiffany Cromwell (AUS)	Lotto–Honda Team	+ 1' 39"
9	Grace Verbeke (BEL)	Topsport Vlaanderen–Ridley	+ 1' 39"
10	Martine Bras (NED)	Dolmans Landscaping Team	+ 1' 39"
