= 2007 Omloop Het Volk (women's race) =

Race details
- Dates: 18 March
- Stages: 1
- Distance: 127 km (79 mi)
- Winning time: 3h 27' 05"

Results
	Winner	Mie Bekker Lacota (DEN)	(Team Flexpoint)
	Second	Monica Holler (SWE)	(Bigla Cycling Team)
	Third	Jaccolien Wallaard (NED)	(Vrienden van het Platteland)

The 2007 Omloop Het Volk was the 2nd edition of the women's Omloop Het Volk road cycling one day race, which was held on 18 March.

== Results ==
Final general classification
Rank	Rider	Team	Time
1	Mie Bekker Lacota (DEN)	Team Flexpoint	3h 27' 05"
2	Monica Holler (SWE)	Bigla Cycling Team	s.t.
3	Jaccolien Wallaard (NED)	Vrienden van het Platteland	s.t.
4	Élodie Touffet (FRA)	Menikini-Selle Italia-Gysko	s.t.
5	Liesbet De Vocht (BEL)	Lotto–Belisol Ladies Team	s.t.
6	Ellen van Dijk (NED)	Vrienden van het Platteland	s.t.
7	Kathleen Sterckx (BEL)	AA-Drink Cycling Team	s.t.
8	Andrea Thürig (SUI)	Bigla Cycling Team	s.t.
9	Loes Gunnewijk (NED)	Team Flexpoint	s.t.
10	Kirsten Wild (NED)	AA-Drink Cycling Team	+ 19"
