= 2012 Le Samyn des Dames =

Race details
- Dates: 29 February 2012
- Stages: 1
- Distance: 116.4 km (72.3 mi)
- Winning time: 3h 04' 28"

Results
	Winner	Adrie Visser (the Netherlands)	(Skil–Argos)
	Second	Noemi Cantele (Italy)	(BePink)
	Third	Trixi Worrack (Germany)	(Team Specialized–lululemon)

The 2012 Le Samyn des Dames was the first running of the women's Le Samyn, a women's bicycle race in Fayt-le-Franc, Belgium. It was held on 29 February 2012 over a distance of 116.4 kilometres (72.3 miles) starting in Frameries and finishing in Dour. It was rated by the UCI as a 1.2 category race. The race was part of the 2012 Lotto Cycling Cup.

The race ended with a bunch sprint.

== Results ==
	Cyclist	Team	Time
1	Adrie Visser (NED)	Skil–Argos	3h 04' 28"
2	Noemi Cantele (ITA)	BePink	s.t.
3	Trixi Worrack (GER)	Team Specialized–lululemon	s.t.
4	Ellen van Dijk (NED)	Team Specialized–lululemon	s.t.
5	Megan Guarnier (USA)	American National Team	s.t.
6	Loes Gunnewijk (NED)	Orica–AIS	s.t.
7	Elisa Longo Borghini (ITA)	Hitec Products–Mistral Home Cycling Team	s.t.
8	Christine Majerus (LUX)	Team GSD Gestion	s.t.
9	Kaat Hannes (BEL)	Lotto–Belisol Ladies	s.t.
10	Jolien D'Hoore (BEL)	Topsport Vlaanderen–Ridley 2012	+ 2"

s.t. = same time
