= Omloop van Borsele =

Dutch road cycling race

Race details
- Date: April/May
- Region: Borsele, Netherlands
- Discipline: Road
- Type: One-day race

History
- First edition: Road race: 2002; Time trial: 2012
- Editions: Road race: 21 (as of 2024); Time trial: 11 (as of 2024)
- First winner: Road race Loes Gunnewijk (NED); Time trial Ellen van Dijk (NED)
- Most wins: Road race (5 wins); Kirsten Wild (NED); Time trial (5 wins); Ellen van Dijk (NED)
- Most recent: Road race Sofie van Rooijen (NED); Time trial Ellen van Dijk (NED)

Omloop van Borsele ("Circuit of Borsele") is an elite women's professional road bicycle race held annually since 2002 in Borsele, Netherlands. Since 2012, the event also contains a time trial. The time trial is together with the GP Leende part of the Dutch national time trial competition.

== Past winners Road Race ==
Year	Country	Rider	Team
2002	Netherlands	Loes Gunnewijk	
2003	Netherlands	Leontien Zijlaard-van Moorsel	
2004	Netherlands	Chantal Beltman	
2005	Netherlands	Marianne Vos	
2006	Netherlands	Marianne Vos	
2007	Netherlands	Marianne Vos	Team DSB Bank
2008	Netherlands	Kirsten Wild	
2009	Netherlands	Kirsten Wild	
2010	Netherlands	Kirsten Wild	Cervélo TestTeam
2011	Netherlands	Kirsten Wild	
2012	Netherlands	Ellen van Dijk	Team Specialized–lululemon
2013	Netherlands	Vera Koedooder	Sengers Ladies Cycling Team
2014	Australia	Chloe Hosking	Team Hitec Products
2015	Netherlands	Kirsten Wild	Team Hitec Products
2016	Italy	Barbara Guarischi	Canyon–SRAM
2017	Netherlands	Riejanne Markus	WM3 Energie
2018	Italy	Elisa Balsamo	Valcar–PBM
2019	Netherlands	Lorena Wiebes	Parkhotel Valkenburg
2020	No race due to COVID-19 pandemic		
2021	No race due to COVID-19 pandemic		
2022	Netherlands	Maaike Boogaard	UAE Team ADQ
2023	Switzerland	Linda Zanetti	UAE Development Team
2024	Netherlands	Sofie van Rooijen	VolkerWessels Women Cyclingteam

== Past winners Time Trial ==
Year	Country	Rider	Team
2012	Netherlands	Ellen van Dijk	Team Specialized–lululemon
2013	Netherlands	Ellen van Dijk	Specialized–lululemon
2014	Netherlands	Ellen van Dijk	Boels–Dolmans
2015	Netherlands	Ellen van Dijk	Boels–Dolmans
2016	Germany	Lisa Brennauer	Canyon–SRAM
2017	Great Britain	Hayley Simmonds	Team WNT
2018	Netherlands	Aafke Soet	WNT–Rotor Pro Cycling
2019	Denmark	Pernille Mathiesen	Team Sunweb
2020	No race due to COVID-19 pandemic		
2021	No race due to COVID-19 pandemic		
2022	Great Britain	Emily Meakin	AWOL O'Shea
2023	Netherlands	Ilse Pluimers	AG Insurance–Soudal–Quick-Step
2024	Netherlands	Ellen van Dijk	Lidl–Trek
