= 2012 Omloop Het Nieuwsblad (women's race) =

Race details
- Dates: 25 February
- Stages: 1
- Distance: 119.4 km (74.2 mi)
- Winning time: 3h 17' 14"

Results
	Winner	Loes Gunnewijk (the Netherlands)	(Orica–AIS)
	Second	Ellen van Dijk (the Netherlands)	(Team Specialized–lululemon)
	Third	Trixi Worrack (Germany)	(Team Specialized–lululemon)

The 2012 Omloop Het Nieuwsblad was the 7th edition of the women's Omloop Het Nieuwsblad road cycling one-day race, which was held on 25 February. The race started and ended in St. Peter's Square in Ghent and covered 119.4 km (74.2 mi) in the province of East Flanders.

The race was won by Dutch rider Loes Gunnewijk in a sprint from Ellen van Dijk. Trixi Worrack finished third.

== Race Overview ==
The women's parcours was 119.4 km, with seven climbs, including the Kluisberg, Côte de Trieu, Paterberg, Edelareberg, Wolvenberg and Molenberg. When the race hit the Paterberg, Elisa Longo Borghini of Hitec-Mistral was the first to top the climb, leading a group of ten or so riders, with a strong group of 12, including Loes Gunnewijk, chasing at 90 seconds behind them. From here onwards, the front of the race was full of attacks, escapes and regroupings. Noemi Cantele, racing for her brand-new team, was especially aggressive, but couldn't make it away from the front group of 12 which had formed at the half-way point of the Côte de Trieu – Cantele; Gunnewijk, Tiffany Cromwell and Amanda Spratt of GreenEdge–AIS; Longo Borghini and Lise Nøstvold of Hitec-Mistral; Ellen van Dijk and Trixi Worrack of Team Specialized–lululemon; Martine Bras (Dolmans-Boels); Pauline Ferrand-Prévot (Rabobank); and Lizzie Armitstead (AA Drink–leontien.nl). Behind them on the road, the race was all small groups, and the group had its share of drama, with Armitstead crashing, and having to chase back with Van Dijk, as well as the usual women's-style attacking at every possible opportunity.

The attacks continued, but none could stick, until at about 20–30 km to go, Gunnewijk attacked on the long cobbled stretch of the Paddestraat. Once the cobbles were over, Van Dijk was able the only one able to bridge across to her, and the two Dutchwomen worked together, to make this attack permanent, with their team-mates behind them to disrupt the chase. At 12 km to go, the pair had 1' 36" on the group, and the race was set up for an exciting duel – Van Dijk the better sprinter, but Gunnewijk a rouleur with some of the best tactical skills out there, looking for her opportunity to escape.

In the end, it was Gunnewijk's attack that won the day, and Van Dijk's team-mate Trixi Worrack completing the podium, winning the sprint for third from the chase group home (and another teammate, Chloe Hosking, sprinting to lead the next group home). It was a tough race, with only 36 out of the 97 riders who finished making it in within the 5% timecut.

== Results ==
Final general classification
Rank	Rider	Team	Time
1	Loes Gunnewijk (NED)	Orica–AIS	3h 17' 14"
2	Ellen van Dijk (NED)	Team Specialized–lululemon	s.t.
3	Trixi Worrack (GER)	Team Specialized–lululemon	+ 1' 10"
4	Martine Bras (NED)	Dolmans-Boels Cycling Team	+ 1' 10"
5	Pauline Ferrand-Prévot (FRA)	Rabobank Women Team	+ 1' 10"
6	Noemi Cantele (ITA)	BePink	+ 1' 10"
7	Elisa Longo Borghini (ITA)	Hitec Products–Mistral Home Cycling Team	+ 1' 10"
8	Tiffany Cromwell (AUS)	Orica–AIS	+ 1' 10"
9	Amanda Spratt (AUS)	Orica–AIS	+ 1' 10"
10	Lizzie Armitstead (GBR)	AA Drink–leontien.nl	+ 1' 10"
