= 2010 Omloop van Borsele =

Race details
- Dates: 24 April 2010
- Stages: 1
- Distance: 120 km (74.56 mi)
- Winning time: 3h 00' 33"

Results
	Winner	Kirsten Wild (the Netherlands)	(Cervélo TestTeam)
	Second	Rochelle Gilmore (Australia)	(Lotto Ladies Team)
	Third	Kirsty Broun (Australia)	(Australian national team)

The 2010 Omloop van Borsele was the 9th running of the Omloop van Borsele, a single-day women's cycling race. It was held on 24 April 2010 over a distance of 120 kilometres (74.6 miles) in the Netherlands. It was rated by the UCI as a 1.2 category race.

== Results ==
	Cyclist	Team	Time
1	Kirsten Wild (NED)	Cervélo TestTeam	3h 00' 33"
2	Rochelle Gilmore (AUS)	Lotto Ladies Team	s.t.
3	Kirsty Broun (AUS)	Australian national team	s.t.
4	Marianne Vos (NED)	Nederland Bloeit	s.t.
5	Ellen van Dijk (NED)	Vrienden van het Platteland	s.t.
6	Charlotte Becker (GER)	Cervélo TestTeam	s.t.
7	Liesbet De Vocht (BEL)	Nederland Bloeit	s.t.
8	Chloe Hoskin (AUS)	Team HTC–Columbia Women	s.t.
9	Nicole Cooke (GBR)	Great Britain national team	s.t.
10	Lucinda Brand (NED)	leontien.nl	s.t.

== See also ==
- 2010 in women's road cycling
