= 2012 UCI Road World Championships – Women's time trial =

Women's time trial
2012 UCI Road World Championships
- Rainbow jersey

Race details
- Dates: 18 September 2012
- Stages: 1
- Distance: 24.3 km (15.1 mi)
- Winning time: 32' 26"

Medalists
	Gold	Judith Arndt (GER)
	Silver	Evelyn Stevens (USA)
	Bronze	Linda Villumsen (NZL)

The Women's time trial of the 2012 UCI Road World Championships cycling event took place on 18 September 2012 in and around Valkenburg, Netherlands.

Judith Arndt of Germany defended successfully her world time trial title. The 36-year-old, who retired at the end of the championships, completed the hilly course in a time of 32 minutes 26 seconds to beat former teammate Evelyn Stevens of the United States by 33 seconds. Stevens had been the seventh last to start, and her time of 33 minutes dead took the lead from Team Specialized–lululemon teammate Ellen van Dijk of the Netherlands. Second last to go, as the previous year's silver medallist, New Zealand's Linda Villumsen, Arndt's Orica–AIS teammate, came closest to unseating the American, but crossed the line in 33’07", which was only good enough for provisional second place, ahead of 2010 champion Emma Pooley of Great Britain. As defending champion Arndt set off last and, after setting the fastest time at both intermediate checkpoints, powered up the final Cauberg climb and sprinted to the finish to push Stevens off the top step of the podium, and Pooley out of the medals altogether.

== Final classification ==
Rank	Rider	Country	Time
1	Judith Arndt	Germany	32' 26"
2	Evelyn Stevens	United States	+ 34"
3	Linda Villumsen	New Zealand	+ 41"
4	Emma Pooley	United Kingdom	+ 49"
5	Ellen van Dijk	Netherlands	+ 54"
6	Ina-Yoko Teutenberg	Germany	+ 1' 34"
7	Amber Neben	United States	+ 1' 43"
8	Trixi Worrack	Germany	+ 1' 45"
9	Martina Sáblíková	Czech Republic	+ 1' 59"
10	Shara Gillow	Australia	+ 2' 00"
11	Anna van der Breggen	Netherlands	+ 2' 08"
12	Emma Johansson	Sweden	+ 2' 13"
13	Tatiana Antoshina	Russia	+ 2' 16"
14	Wendy Houvenaghel	United Kingdom	+ 2' 17"
15	Elisa Longo Borghini	Italy	+ 2' 20"
16	Carmen Small	United States	+ 2' 29"
17	Natalia Boyarskaya	Russia	+ 2' 32"
18	Audrey Cordon	France	+ 2' 47"
19	Edwige Pitel	France	+ 2' 52"
20	Patricia Schwager	Switzerland	+ 2' 53"
21	Joëlle Numainville	Canada	+ 2' 55"
22	Rhae-Christie Shaw	Canada	+ 3' 03"
23	Martina Ritter	Austria	+ 3' 05"
24	Tjaša Rutar	Slovenia	+ 3' 15"
25	Cecilie Johnsen	Norway	+ 3' 20"
26	Clemilda Fernandes	Brazil	+ 3' 20"
27	Eugenia Bujak	Poland	+ 3' 21"
28	Rossella Ratto	Italy	+ 3' 29"
29	Sari Saarelainen	Finland	+ 3' 30"
30	Sérika Gulumá Ortiz	Colombia	+ 3' 39"
31	Anna Sanchis Chafer	Spain	+ 3' 39"
32	Olena Pavlukhina	Ukraine	+ 3' 45"
33	Olivia Dillon	Ireland	+ 3' 47"
34	Kataržina Sosna	Lithuania	+ 3' 54"
35	Anna Nahirna	Ukraine	+ 3' 56"
36	Jarmila Machačová	Czech Republic	+ 4' 08"
37	Martyna Klekot	Poland	+ 4' 19"
38	Verónica Leal Balderas	Mexico	+ 4' 26"
39	Aleksandra Sošenko	Lithuania	+ 4' 34"
40	Kathryn Bertine	Saint Kitts and Nevis	+ 4' 35"
41	Mia Radotić	Croatia	+ 5' 07"
42	Semra Yetiş	Turkey	+ 8' 10"
