= Bloeizone Fryslân Tour =

Women's cycle race in the Netherlands

Healthy Ageing Tour
Race details
- Date: March/April
- Region: Netherlands
- Discipline: Road
- Competition: 2.2 (2011–2018); 2.1 (2019– )
- Type: Stage race
- Web site: bloeizonefryslantour.nl

History
- First edition: 2011
- Editions: 11 (as of 2022)
- First winner: Adrie Visser (NED)
- Most wins: Ellen van Dijk (NED) (5 wins)
- Most recent: Ellen van Dijk (NED)

The Bloeizone Fryslân Tour, also known as the EasyToys Bloeizone Fryslân Tour for sponsorship reasons, is an elite women's annual multiple stage road bicycle race event held in the province Groningen in the Netherlands since 2011. The stage race is rated by the UCI as category 2.1, having been upgraded from 2.2 in 2018. The race was previously known as the Energiewacht Tour from 2011 to 2016 and then the Healthy Ageing Tour from 2017 to 2021.

== Winners ==
Year	Winner		Second		Third	
Energiewacht Tour
2011	Adrie Visser (NED)	HTC–Highroad Women	Loes Gunnewijk (NED)	Nederland bloeit	Marianne Vos (NED)	Nederland bloeit
2012	Ina-Yoko Teutenberg (GER)	Team Specialized–lululemon	Ellen van Dijk (NED)	Team Specialized–lululemon	Marianne Vos (NED)	Rabobank Women Team
2013	Ellen van Dijk (NED)	Specialized–lululemon	Loes Gunnewijk (NED)	Orica–AIS	Kirsten Wild (NED)	Argos–Shimano
2014	Lucinda Brand (NED)	Rabobank-Liv Woman Cycling Team	Vera Koedooder (NED)	Bigla Cycling Team	Trixi Worrack (GER)	Specialized–lululemon
2015	Lisa Brennauer (GER)	Velocio–SRAM	Trixi Worrack (GER)	Velocio–SRAM	Christine Majerus (LUX)	Boels–Dolmans
2016	Ellen van Dijk (NED)	Boels–Dolmans	Annemiek van Vleuten (NED)	Orica–AIS	Lisa Brennauer (GER)	Canyon//SRAM
Healthy Ageing Tour
2017	Ellen van Dijk (NED)	Team Sunweb	Anna van der Breggen (NED)	Boels–Dolmans	Lisa Brennauer (GER)	Canyon//SRAM
2018	Amy Pieters (NED)	Boels–Dolmans	Chantal Blaak (NED)	Boels–Dolmans	Christine Majerus (LUX)	Boels–Dolmans
2019	Lisa Klein (GER)	Canyon//SRAM	Ellen van Dijk (NED)	Trek–Segafredo	Kirsten Wild (NED)	WNT–Rotor Pro Cycling
2020	Cancelled due to the COVID-19 pandemic					
2021	Ellen van Dijk (NED)	Trek–Segafredo	Lisa Brennauer (GER)	Ceratizit–WNT Pro Cycling	Emma Norsgaard Jørgensen (DEN)	Movistar Team
Bloeizone Fryslân Tour
2022	Ellen van Dijk (NED)	Trek–Segafredo	Riejanne Markus (NED)	Team Jumbo–Visma	Marlen Reusser (SUI)	SD Worx

== Jerseys ==
Classification	2011	2012	2013	2014	2015	2016	2017	2018	2019	2020	2021	2022
General												
Points												
Sprints												
Combativity												
Youth												
Club												
