= Celtic Chrono =

Race details
- Date: June
- Region: Belfast, Northern Ireland
- Discipline: Time Trial

History
- First edition: 2012
- Editions: 1 (as of 2012)
- First winner: Wendy Houvenaghel (GBR)
- Most wins: Wendy Houvenaghel (GBR) (1 win)
- Most recent: Wendy Houvenaghel (GBR)

The Celtic Chrono was an elite women's professional time trial held in Belfast and was rated by the UCI as a 1.2 race.

== Past winners ==
Year	Country	Rider	Team
2012	Great Britain	Wendy Houvenaghel	
