= Belgium Tour =

Women's road cycling stage race

Lotto Belgium Tour
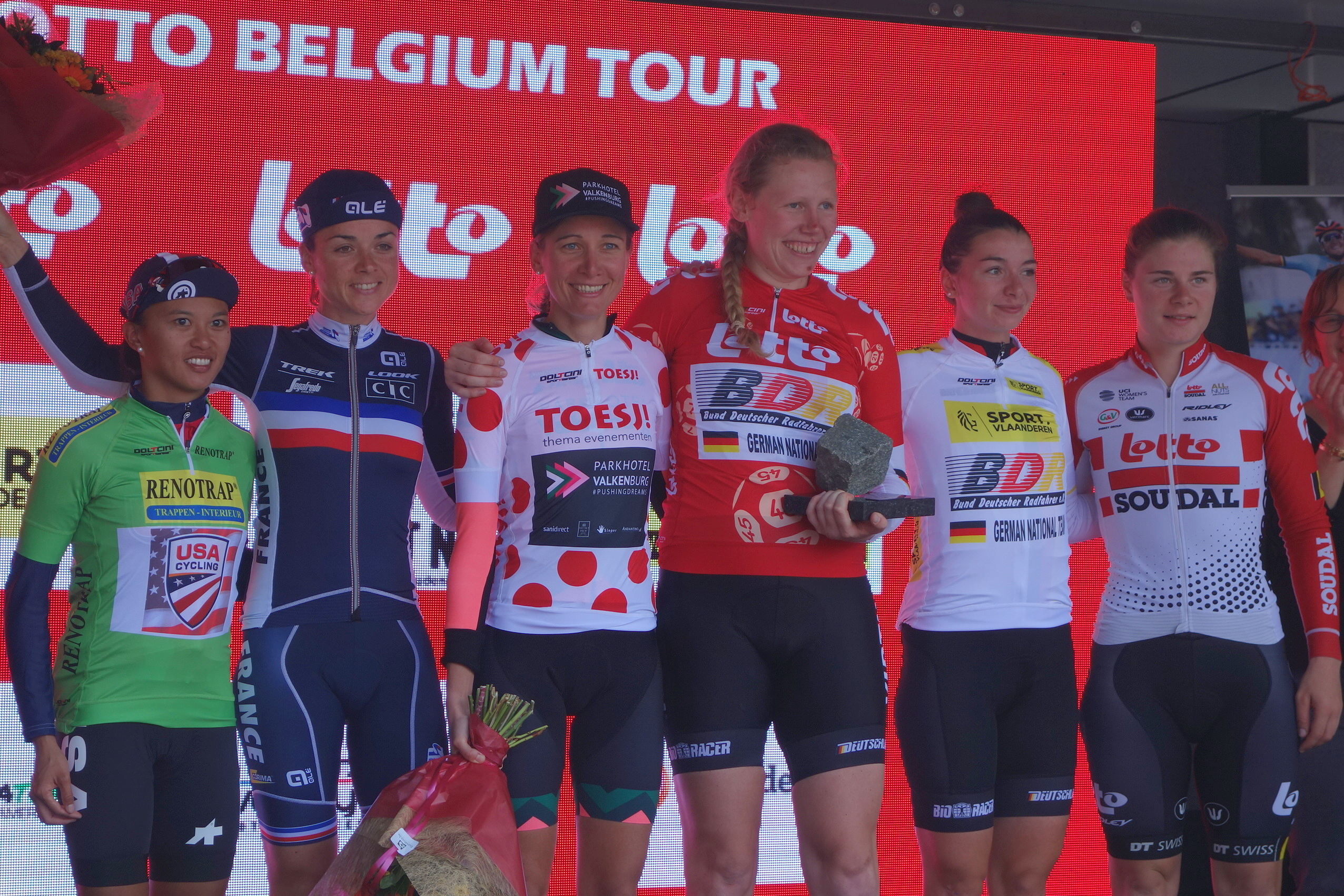
- Podium & jersey winners in 2019: Rivera, Cordon-Ragot, De Vuyst, Kröger, Lippert and Kopecky

Race details
- Date: September
- Region: Belgium
- Local name: Ronde van België
- Competition: UCI 2.1 Elite Woman
- Type: Stage Race
- Organiser: Vzw Belgium Ladies Cycling
- Race director: Patrick Dries
- Web site: www.lottobelgiumtour.be

History
- First edition: 2012
- Editions: 10 (as of 2022)
- First winner: Ellen van Dijk (NED)
- Most wins: Ellen van Dijk (NED); Annemiek van Vleuten (NED) (2 wins)
- Most recent: Agnieszka Skalniak-Sójka (POL)

The Lotto Belgium Tour is an elite women's professional road bicycle stage race, held in Belgium since 2012.

In the first year the tour consisted of three stages and grew with a team time trial to four stages in 2013.

The organisation is Vzw Belgium Ladies Cycling.

== Past winners ==
Year	Country	Rider	Team
2012	Netherlands	Ellen van Dijk	Team Specialized–lululemon
2013	Netherlands	Ellen van Dijk	Specialized–lululemon
2014	Netherlands	Annemiek van Vleuten	Rabobank-Liv Woman Cycling Team
2015	Sweden	Emma Johansson	Orica–AIS
2016	Netherlands	Annemiek van Vleuten	Netherlands (national team)
2017	Netherlands	Anouska Koster	WM3 Energie
2018	Germany	Liane Lippert	Germany (national team)
2019	Germany	Mieke Kröger	Germany (national team)
2020	No race due to COVID-19 pandemic		
2021	Belgium	Lotte Kopecky	Liv Racing
2022	Poland	Agnieszka Skalniak-Sójka	Poland (national team)
2023	No race due to lack of funding		
