= Jessie MacLean =

Australian cyclist

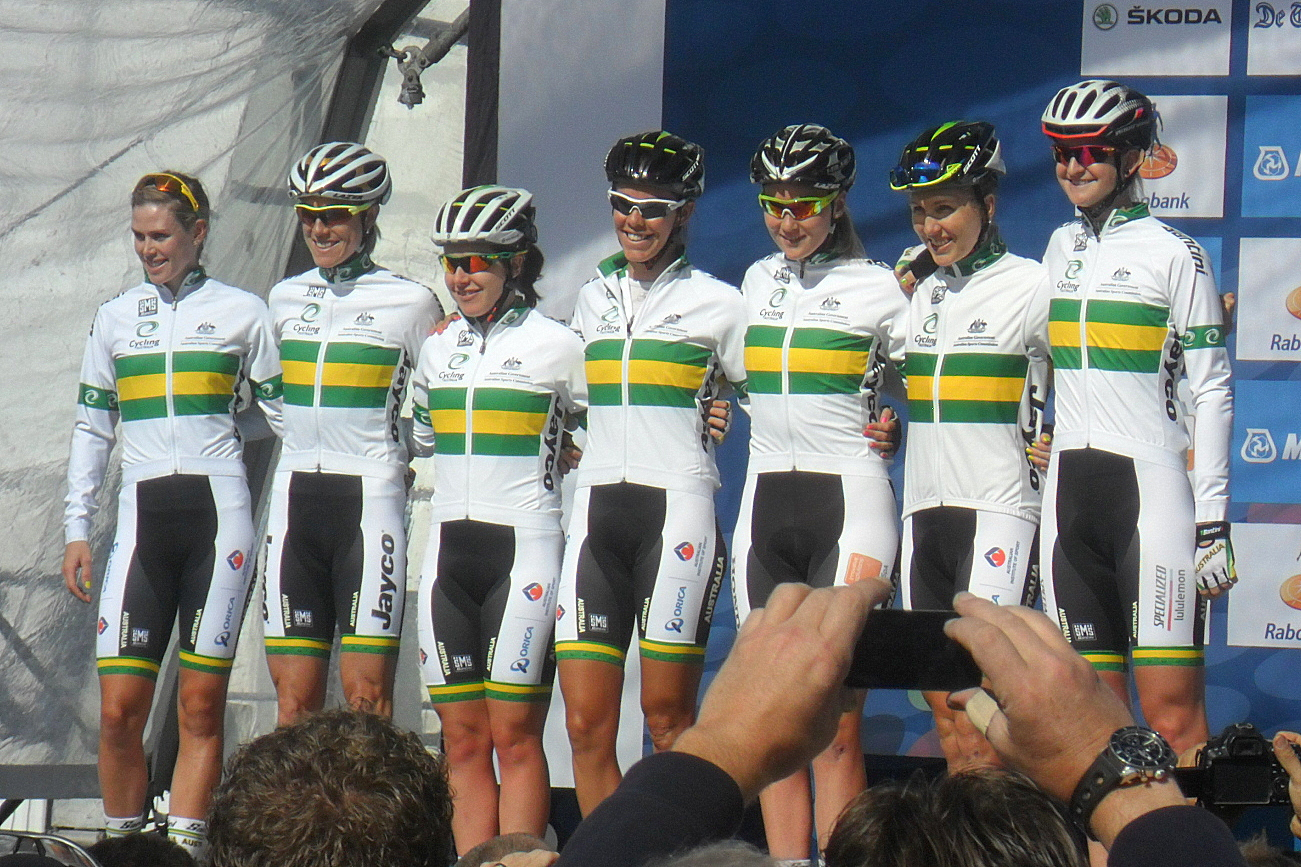
- Jessie MacLean with the Australian team at the 2012 UCI Road World Championships

Personal information
- Born: 17 October 1985 (age 40) Ballarat, Victoria, Australia

Cycling career
- Sport: Cycling
- Role: Rider

Professional team
- 2012–2014: Orica–AIS

Jessie MacLean (born 17 October 1985) is an Australian racing cyclist. She rode at the 2011, 2012 and 2014 UCI Road World Championships, where she won silver with Orica–AIS in the Team Time Trial.
