= Halle-Buizingen =

Women's cycling event in Belgium

Race details
- Date: April
- Region: Belgium
- Discipline: Road
- Type: One day race

History
- First edition: 2010
- Editions: 3
- Final edition: 2012
- First winner: Jennifer Hohl
- Most wins: No repeat winners
- Final winner: Chloe Hosking

Halle-Buizingen was a women's one-day cycle race which took place in Belgium and was rated initially as a National Event, but later ranked by the UCI as 1.2.

== Previous winners ==
Year	Winner	Second	Third
2010	(Switzerland) Jennifer Hohl	(Switzerland) Désirée Ehrler	(Belgium) Sanne Bamelis
2011	(Netherlands) Martine Bras	(Belgium) Liesbet De Vocht	(Belgium) Ludivine Henrion
2012	(Australia) Chloe Hosking	(Sweden) Emma Johansson	(Belgium) Liesbet De Vocht
