= Kristin McGrath =

American cyclist

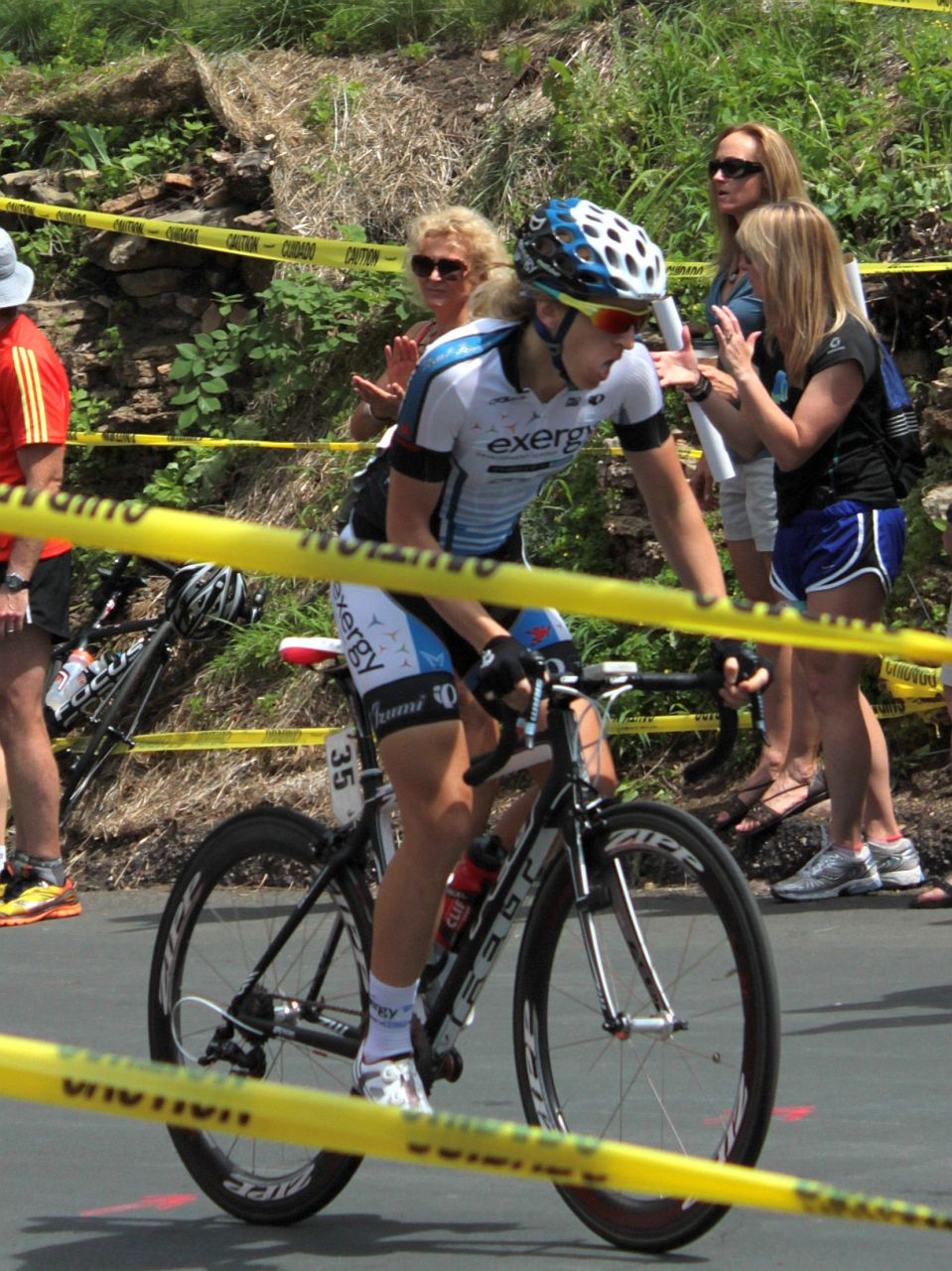

Personal information
- Born: October 21, 1982 (age 43)

Cycling career
- Sport: Cycling
- Role: Rider

Kristin McGrath (born October 21, 1982) is an American racing cyclist.
