= Loes Gunnewijk =

Dutch racing cyclist

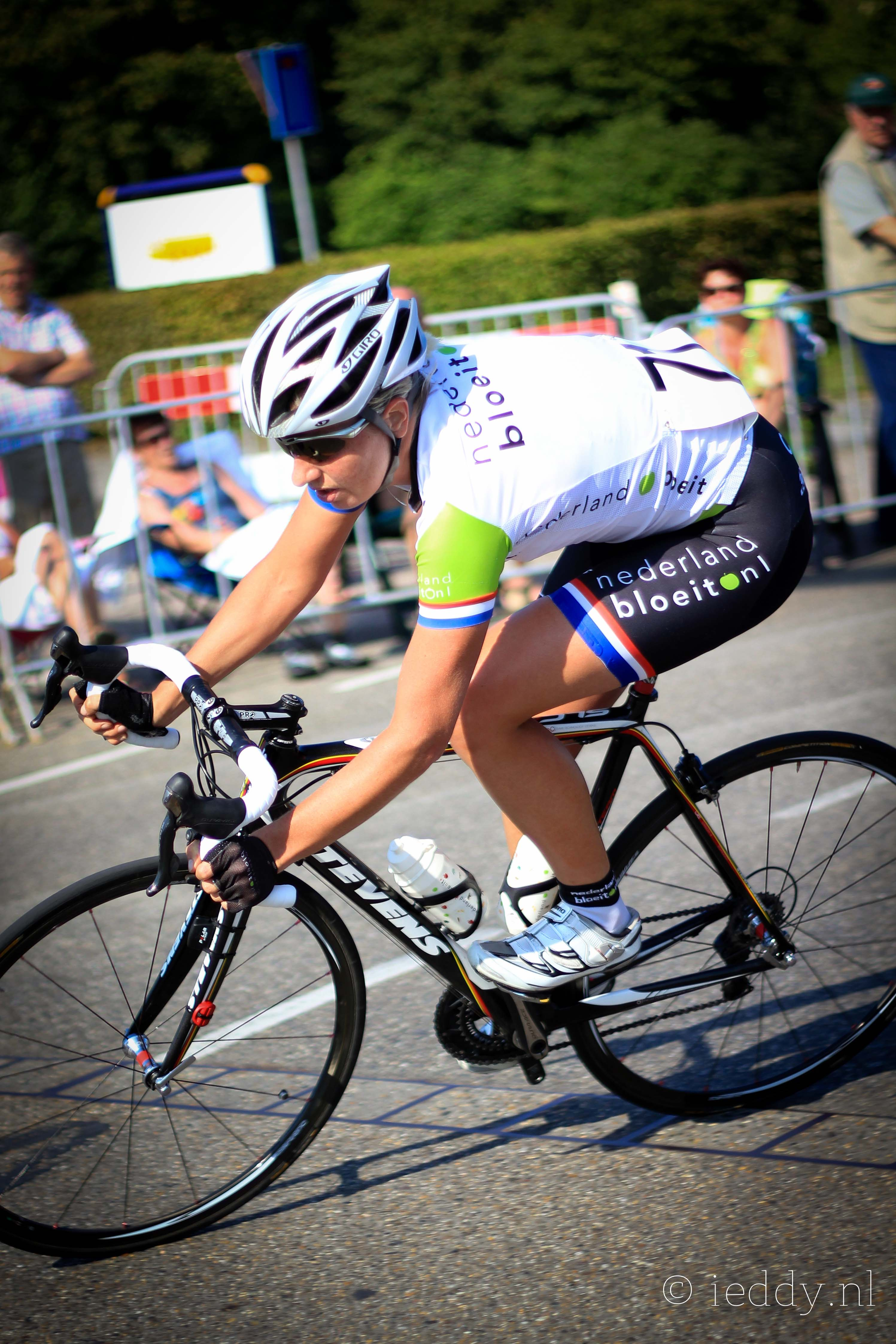

Personal information
- Full name: Loes Gunnewijk
- Born: 27 November 1980 (age 45) Groenlo, Netherlands

Cycling career
- Sport: Cycling
- Current team: KNWU
- Discipline: Road
- Role: Rider (retired); Directeur sportif; Coach

Professional teams
- 2004–2005: Ondernemers van Nature
- 2006–2009: Team Flexpoint
- 2010–2011: Nederland bloeit
- 2012–2015: Orica–AIS

Managerial teams
- 2016: Orica–AIS
- 2017–: KNWU

Major wins
- Omloop Het Nieuwsblad (2012)
Medal record
Representing Orica–AIS
Women's road cycling
UCI Road World Championships
Silver medal – second place	2012 Valkenburg	Team time trial
Silver medal – second place	2013 Tuscany	Team time trial

Loes Gunnewijk (born 27 November 1980 in Groenlo) is a Dutch former professional racing cyclist, who rode professionally between 2004 and 2015.

Gunnewijk was a member of the Dutch national team together with Ellen van Dijk, Marianne Vos and Annemiek van Vleuten in the road race at the 2012 Summer Olympics where Vos won the gold medal. Gunnewijk announced her retirement from the sport in May 2015, subsequently completing the Union Cycliste Internationale's Sports Directors Diploma course in November 2015. Between May and the end of 2016, Gunnewijk joined her old cycling team Orica–AIS as a trainee directeur sportif. Since 2017, Gunnewijk has been the head junior women's coach and assistant para-cycling coach for the Dutch cycling national federation KNWU.

== Major results ==
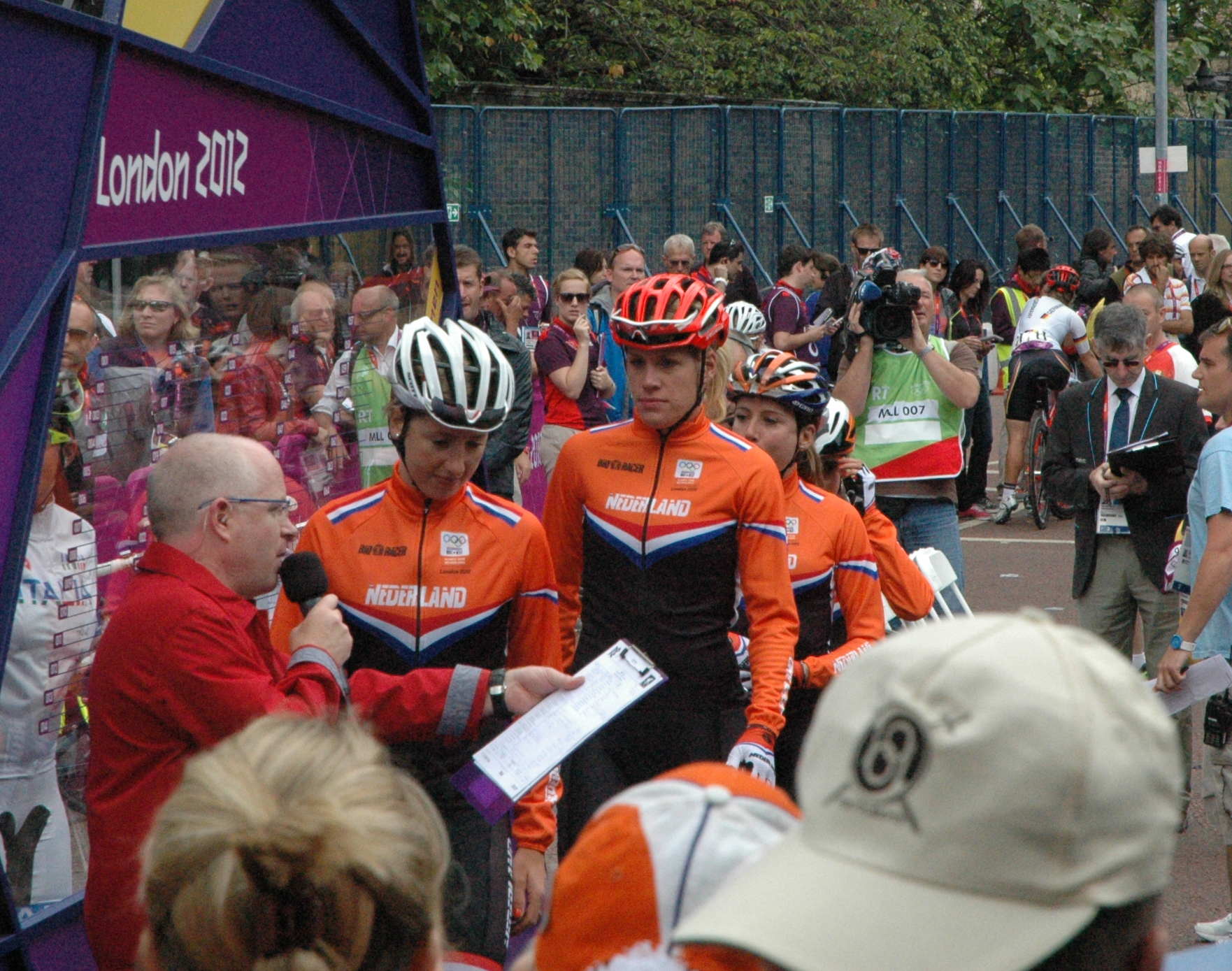
Gunnewijk before start of the road race at the 2012 Summer Olympics together with Ellen van Dijk, Marianne Vos and Annemiek van Vleuten

2002
1st Omloop van Borsele
2nd Time trial, National Road Championships
9th Overall Holland Ladies Tour

2003
1st Stage 9 (ITT) Giro d'Italia Femminile
3rd Individual pursuit, National Track Championships

2004
2nd Time trial, National Road Championships
2nd Overall Ster Zeeuwsche Eilanden

1st Stage 3a

5th Overall Tour de Feminin – O cenu Českého Švýcarska
6th Overall Holland Ladies Tour
7th Tour of Flanders for Women
9th Overall Novilon Damesronde van Drenthe

2005
1st Herford Cyclocross
1st Stage 4 Tour de l'Aude Cycliste Féminin
2nd Time trial, National Road Championships
2nd Overall Ster Zeeuwsche Eilanden
2nd Omloop door Middag-Humsterland
4th Ronde van Gelderland
5th Overall Novilon Damesronde van Drenthe
5th Overall Holland Ladies Tour

2006
1st Time trial, World University Cycling Championship
1st Time trial, National Road Championships
Tour de l'Aude Cycliste Féminin

1st Stages 1 (TTT) & 3 (ITT)

1st Stage 4b La Route de France
2nd Overall Euregio Ladies Tour

1st Stage 2

2nd L'Heure D'Or Féminine
3rd Tour of Flanders for Women
5th Overall Ster Zeeuwsche Eilanden
6th Overall Holland Ladies Tour
8th Omloop Het Volk

2007
6th Overall Gracia–Orlová
7th Overall Ster Zeeuwsche Eilanden
9th Omloop Het Volk
10th Ronde van Gelderland
10th Durango-Durango Emakumeen Saria

2008
2nd Chrono Champenois – Trophée Européen
3rd Time trial, National Road Championships
6th Omloop door Middag-Humsterland
7th Overall Holland Ladies Tour
9th Overall Grande Boucle Féminine Internationale
9th Omloop van Borsele

2009
2nd Ronde van Drenthe
3rd Open de Suède Vårgårda TTT
4th Overall Ster Zeeuwsche Eilanden
5th Overall Holland Ladies Tour

1st Mountains classification

5th Novilon Eurocup Ronde van Drenthe
6th Trofeo Alfredo Binda-Comune di Cittiglio
8th Overall Ladies Tour of Qatar
9th Overall Tour de l'Aude Cycliste Féminin
9th Drentse 8 van Dwingeloo
9th Tour of Flanders for Women
9th Holland Hills Classic

2010
1st Road race, National Road Championships
1st Ronde van Drenthe
3rd Open de Suède Vårgårda TTT
5th Overall La Route de France
8th Overall Iurreta-Emakumeen Bira
8th Omloop Het Nieuwsblad
9th Overall Tour de l'Aude Cycliste Féminin

2011
2nd Overall Energiewacht Tour
3rd Time trial, National Road Championships
4th Omloop Het Nieuwsblad
6th Overall Ladies Tour of Qatar
8th Overall Holland Ladies Tour

1st Stage 3

2012
1st Omloop Het Nieuwsblad
2nd Team time trial, UCI Road World Championships
3rd Overall Tour Féminin en Limousin
4th GP Comune di Cornaredo
5th Overall Energiewacht Tour
6th Overall Ladies Tour of Qatar
6th Le Samyn des Dames
7th Tour of Flanders for Women
9th Ronde van Drenthe

2013
2nd Time trial, National Road Championships
2nd Overall Energiewacht Tour
2nd EPZ Omloop van Borsele
3rd Team time trial, UCI Road World Championships
3rd Acht van Chaam
4th Overall Belgium Tour
6th 7-Dorpenomloop Aalburg
8th Tour of Flanders for Women
9th Open de Suède Vårgårda
10th Omloop Het Nieuwsblad

2014
1st Overall Santos Women's Cup

1st Stage 1

4th Gooik–Geraardsbergen–Gooik

2015
9th Overall Bay Classic Series

=== General classification results ===
Grand Tour results timeline
Stage race	2004	2005	2006	2007	2008	2009	2010	2011	2012	2013	2014	2015
Giro d'Italia Femminile	—	—	14	—	—	—	—	51	36	57	74	—
Stage race results timeline
Stage race	2004	2005	2006	2007	2008	2009	2010	2011	2012	2013	2014	2015
/ Emakumeen Euskal Bira	—	—	—	—	—	—	8	28	—	45	55	—
/ / The Women's Tour	Race did not exist										18	—
Thüringen Rundfahrt der Frauen	7	—	—	—	21	—	—	17	—	42	—	—

=== Classics results timeline ===
Monuments results timeline
Monuments	2002	2003	2004	2005	2006	2007	2008	2009	2010	2011	2012	2013	2014	2015
Tour of Flanders	—	—	7	DNF	3	26	81	9	25	26	7	8	DNF	DNF
Classics results timeline
Classic	2002	2003	2004	2005	2006	2007	2008	2009	2010	2011	2012	2013	2014	2015
Amstel Gold Race	13	62	Not held											
Omloop Het Nieuwsblad	—	—	—	—	8	9	57	16	8	4	1	10	68	38
Gent–Wevelgem	Race did not exist												—	40
Trofeo Alfredo Binda	—	—	—	—	—	—	61	6	21	18	17	11	—	—
La Flèche Wallonne	—	66	37	14	25	—	50	9	22	49	73	47	79	—
Open de Suède Vårgårda	Race did not exist				20	—	34	18	14	29	33	9	—	—

==== Major championship results ====
Event		2002	2003	2004	2005	2006	2007	2008	2009	2010	2011	2012	2013	2014	2015
Olympic Games	Road race	Not Held		—	Not Held			—	Not Held			OTL	Not Held		
World Championships	Team time trial	Race did not exist										3	2	—	—

Legend
—	Did not compete
DNF	Did not finish
NH	Not held
OTL	Outside time limit

== See also ==
- List of Dutch Olympic cyclists
