= Alex Rhodes (cyclist) =

Australian racing cyclist

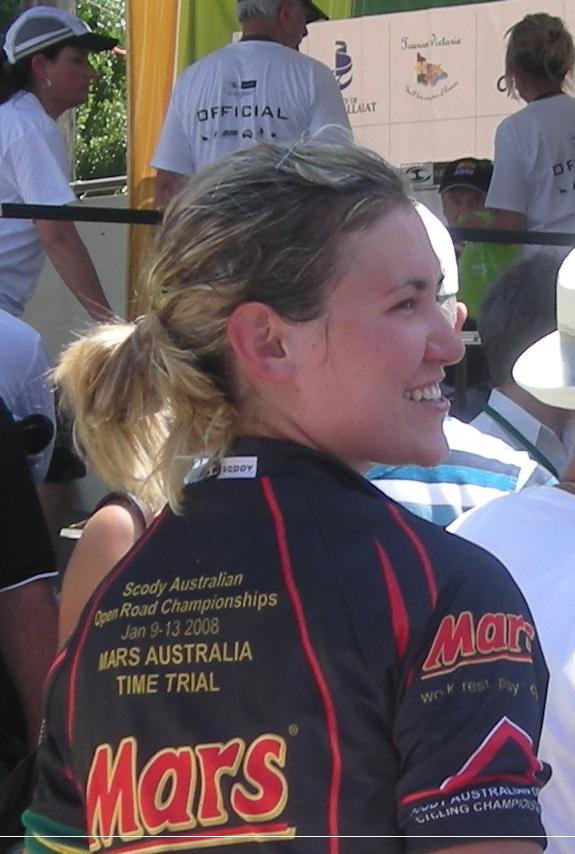
- Rhodes at the Australian Championships January 2008

Personal information
- Full name: Alexis Rhodes
- Nickname: Alexi
- Born: 1 December 1984 (age 41) Alice Springs, Australia

Cycling career
- Sport: Cycling
- Current team: Orica–AIS
- Disciplines: Road, Track
- Role: Rider

Professional teams
- 2007–2010: T-Mobile/High Road
- 2011: Garmin–Cervélo
- 2012: Orica–AIS

Major wins
- Bay Classic, 2 stages
Medal record
Women's road cycling
Representing Orica–AIS
UCI Road World Championships
Silver medal – second place	2012 Valkenburg	Team time trial

Alexis "Alex" Rhodes (born 1 December 1984) is an Australian professional racing cyclist.

On 18 July 2005, Rhodes suffered major trauma when a car drove into a training squad of Australian cyclists training near Zeulenroda, Germany, killing her teammate Amy Gillett.

== Career highlights ==
2002
1st Pursuit, UCI Track World Championships – Juniors
2004
1st Points race, World Cup, Sydney
3rd Pursuit, World Cup, Sydney
2005
2nd Points race, World Cup, Los Angeles
3rd Points race, World Cup, Manchester
3rd Pursuit, Australian National Track Championships, Adelaide
2006
1st Stage 3 Bay Classic, Geelong Ritchie Boulevard
3rd Pursuit, Australian National Track Championships, Adelaide
3rd Points race, Australian National Track Championships, Adelaide
2007
1st Stage 3 Bay Classic, Ritchie Boulevard
1st Stage 4 Bay Classic, Geelong Botanic Gardens
2008
1st Stage 1 Bay Classic
3rd Australian National Time Trial Championships, Ballarat
2012
2nd Team time trial, 2012 UCI Road World Championships
