= 2013 Boels–Dolmans season =

2013 Boels–Dolmans Cycling Team
- UCI Team ranking: 11th
- Manager: Steven Rooks

Season victories
- One-day races: 1
- Stage race overall: 0
- Stage race stages: 0
- Best ranked rider: Lizzie Armitstead (17th)

The 2013 women's road cycling season was the fourth for the Boels–Dolmans Cycling Team, which began as the Dolmans Landscaping Team in 2010.

== Roster ==
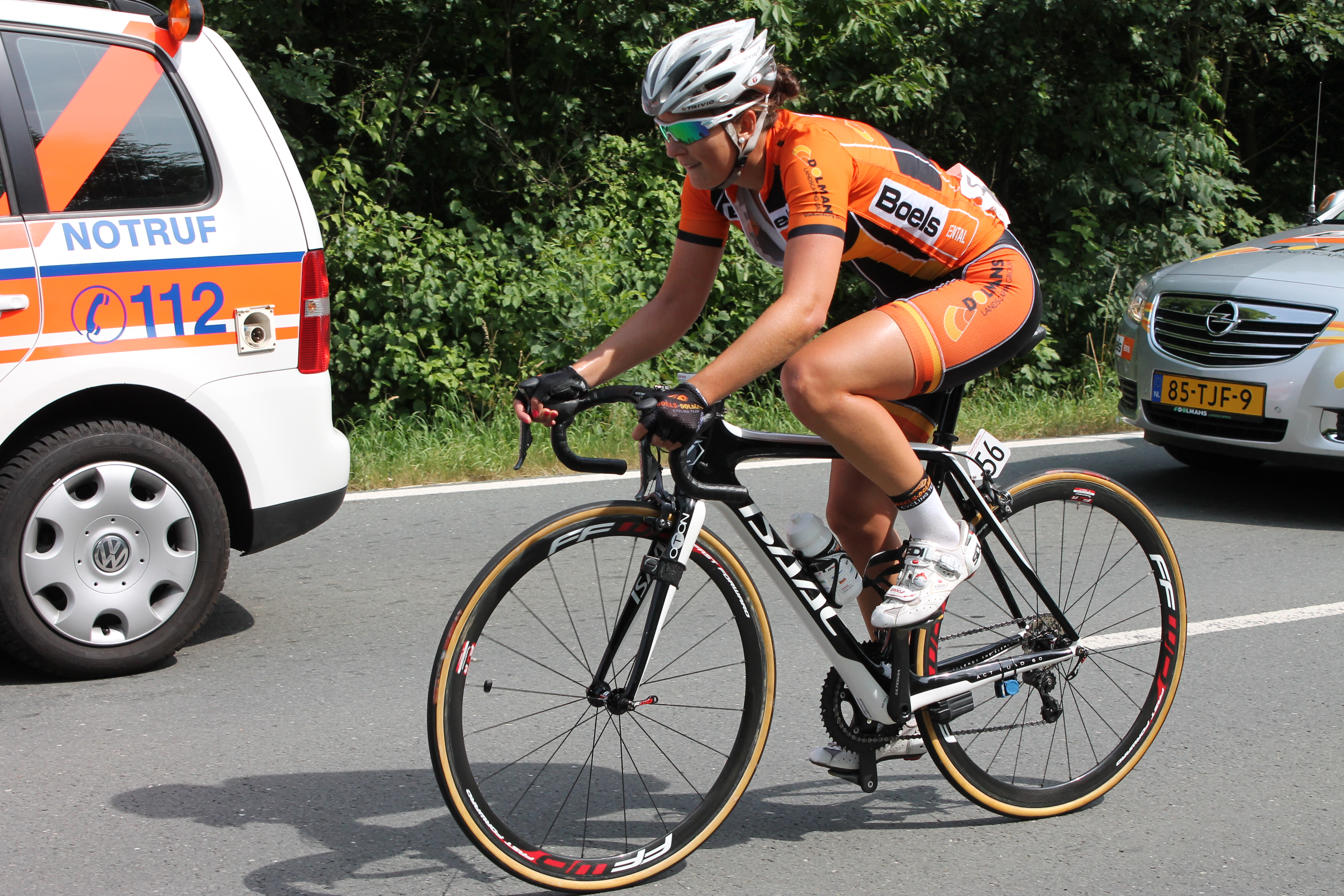
Marieke van Wanroij

As of 1 January 2013. Ages as of 1 January 2013.

Rider	Date of birth
Lizzie Armitstead (GBR)	December 18, 1988 (aged 24)
Martine Bras (NED)	May 17, 1978 (aged 34)
Jessie Daams (BEL)	May 28, 1990 (aged 22)
Kim de Baat (NED)	May 29, 1991 (aged 21)
Romy Kasper (GER)	February 10, 1992 (aged 20)
Nina Kessler (NED)	July 4, 1988 (aged 24)

Rider	Date of birth
Lucy Martin (GBR)	May 5, 1990 (aged 22)
Pauliena Rooijakkers (NED)	May 12, 1993 (aged 19)
Emma Trott (GBR)	December 24, 1989 (aged 23)
Marieke van Wanroij (NED)	July 5, 1979 (aged 33)
Adrie Visser (NED)	October 19, 1983 (aged 29)

== Season victories ==
National, Continental and World champions 2013
Date	Discipline	Jersey	Winner
23 June	British National Road Race Champion		Lizzie Armitstead

== Results in major races ==
=== Single day races ===
Results at the 2013 World Cup races
Date	#	Race	Best rider	Place
9 March	1	Ronde van Drenthe	(United Kingdom) Lizzie Armitstead	7th
24 March	2	Trofeo Alfredo Binda-Comune di Cittiglio	(Netherlands) Adrie Visser	18th
31 March	3	Tour of Flanders	(Netherlands) Adrie Visser	6th
17 April	4	La Flèche Wallonne Féminine	(Netherlands) Jessie Daams	10th
12 May	5	Tour of Chongming Island	(Netherlands) Kim de Baat	8th
16 August	6	Open de Suède Vårgårda TTT	Boels–Dolmans	8th
18 August	7	Open de Suède Vårgårda	(Netherlands) Nina Kessler	18th
31 August	8	GP de Plouay	(United Kingdom) Lizzie Armitstead	24th
Final individual classification			(United Kingdom) Lizzie Armitstead	14th
Final team classification			Boels–Dolmans	8th

Results at the 2013 UCI Road World Championships
Date	Race	Best rider	Place
22 September	UCI Road World Championships – Women's team time trial	Boels–Dolmans Cycling Team	10th
24 September	UCI Road World Championships – Women's time trial (Note: Riders are part of the national team)	-	-
28 September	UCI Road World Championships – Women's road race (Note: Riders are part of the national team)	(United Kingdom) Lizzie Armitstead	19th

=== Grand Tours ===
Results of the team in the grand tours
Grand tour	Giro d'Italia Femminile
Rider (classification)	Jessie Daams (20th)
Victories	0 stage wins

== UCI World Ranking ==
The team finished eleventh in the UCI ranking for teams.

Individual world ranking
Rank	Rider	Points
17	(United Kingdom) Lizzie Armitstead	272.5
59	(Netherlands) Adrie Visser	86.5
79	(Belgium) Jessie Daams	61.5
96	(Netherlands) Martine Bras	48
122	(Netherlands) Kim de Baat	31
136	(Netherlands) Romy Kasper	25.5
213	(Netherlands) Nina Kessler	12
235	(United Kingdom) Emma Trott	10
300	(United Kingdom) Lucy Martin	6
