= 2013 Wiggle–Honda season =

Season for a cycling team

2013 Wiggle–Honda
- UCI Team ranking: 5th

Season victories
- One-day races
- Stage race overall
- Best ranked rider: Giorgia Bronzini (4th)

The 2013 women's road cycling season was the first year of the team Wiggle–Honda.

== Roster ==
As of 1 June 2013.

Rider	Date of birth
Elinor Barker (GBR)	7 September 1994 (age 31)
Beatrice Bartelloni (ITA)	5 February 1993 (age 33)
Charlotte Becker (GER)	19 May 1983 (age 43)
Giorgia Bronzini (ITA)	3 August 1983 (age 42)
Emily Collins (NZL)	16 September 1990 (age 35)
Rochelle Gilmore (AUS)	14 December 1981 (age 44)
Dani King (GBR)	21 November 1990 (age 35)

Rider	Date of birth
Lauren Kitchen (AUS)	21 November 1990 (age 35)
Mayuko Hagiwara (JPN)	16 October 1986 (age 39)
Amy Roberts (GBR)	24 December 1994 (age 31)
Joanna Rowsell (GBR)	5 December 1988 (age 37)
Anna-Bianca Schnitzmeier (GER)	27 July 1990 (age 35)
Laura Trott (GBR)	24 April 1992 (age 34)
Linda Villumsen (NZL)	9 April 1985 (age 41)

== Season ==
On March 3 the team achieved its first ever victory when Emily Collins won the Omloop van het Hageland one day race in Belgium. Collins Shelly Olds (Team TIBCO) and Emma Johansson (Orica–AIS) in a final sprint. On May 18 the team earned its first overall General classification win at the Tour of Zhoushan Island in China where Giorgia Bronzini took overall victory from the Hitec Products UCK pairing of Elisa Longo Borghini and Cecille Gotaas Johnsen by 14 seconds and 1 minute 6 seconds respectively. The team's second overall victory came at the 2013 La Route de France, where Linda Villumsen won stage 7 and in doing so took overall victory from Emma Johansson by 5 minutes 52 seconds. The race will be remembered for the record breaking efforts of Bronzini who won six consecutive stages (1–6) breaking the all-time record for consecutive stage wins in a women's stage racing and meaning that the team won all 7 road stages. The team finished the season 5th in the UCI Rankings (1060 points) and 7th in the Women's World Cup rankings (166 points).

== Results in major races ==
=== Single day races ===
Results at the 2013 World Cup races
Date	#	Race	Best rider	Place
9 March	1	Ronde van Drenthe	(Italy) Giorgia Bronzini	24th
24 March	2	Trofeo Alfredo Binda-Comune di Cittiglio	(Australia) Lauren Kitchen	13th
31 March	3	Tour of Flanders	(Italy) Giorgia Bronzini	13th
17 April	4	La Flèche Wallonne Féminine	(United Kingdom) Joanna Rowsell	46th
12 May	5	Tour of Chongming Island	(Italy) Giorgia Bronzini	2nd
16 August	6	Open de Suède Vårgårda TTT	Wiggle–Honda	5th
18 August	7	Open de Suède Vårgårda	(Italy) Giorgia Bronzini	10th
31 August	8	GP de Plouay	-	-
Final individual classification			(Italy) Giorgia Bronzini	9th
Final team classification			Wiggle–Honda	7th

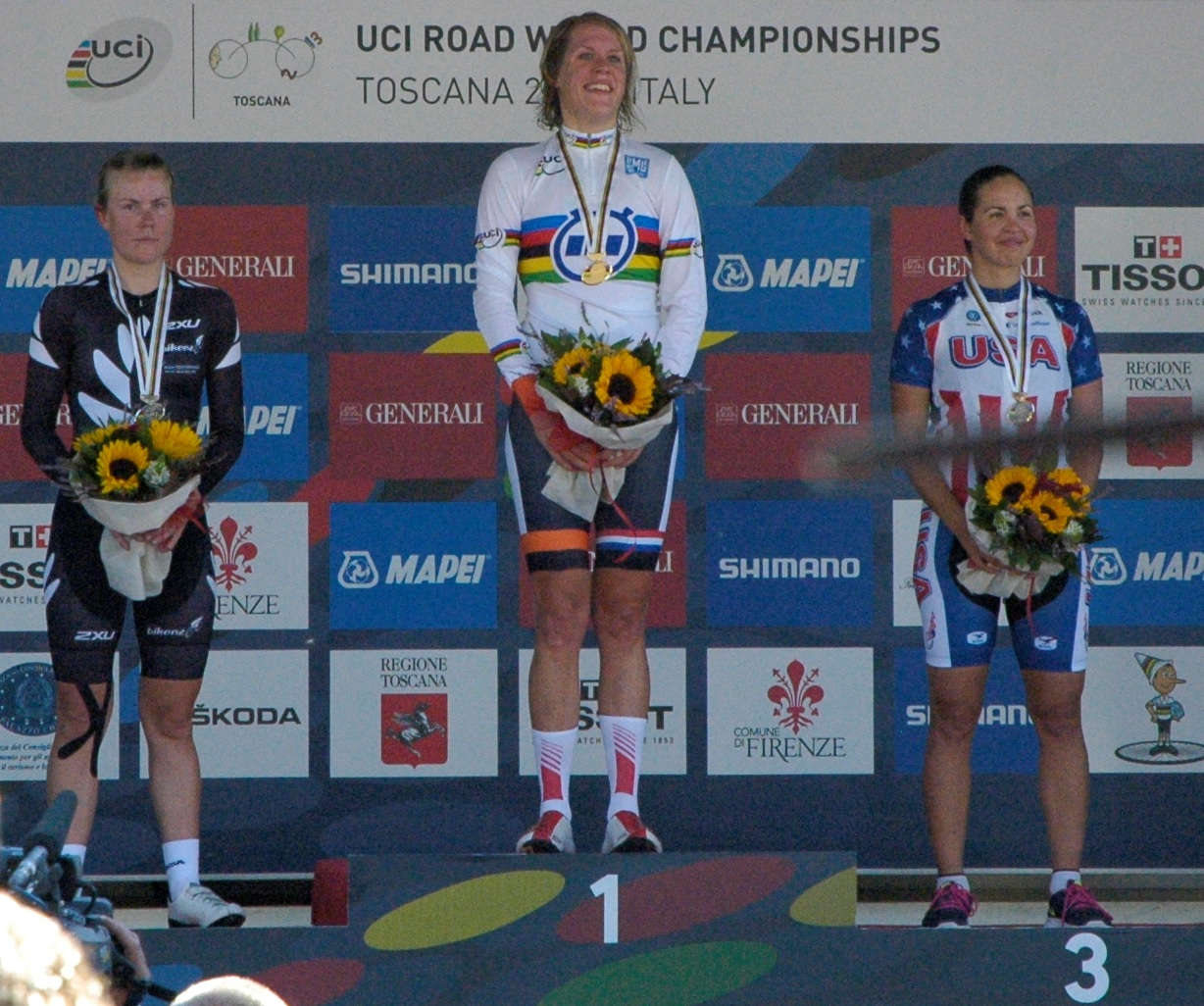
Villumsen (left) finished second at the World Time Trial Championships behind Ellen van Dijk.

Other major single day races
Date	Race	Best rider	Place
22 September	UCI Road World Championships – Women's team time trial	Wiggle–Honda	6th
24 September	UCI Road World Championships – Women's time trial (Note: Riders are part of the national team)	(New Zealand) Linda Villumsen	2nd
28 September	UCI Road World Championships – Women's road race (Note: Riders are part of the national team)	(New Zealand) Linda Villumsen	6th

=== Grand Tours ===
Results of the team in the grand tours
Grand tour	Giro d'Italia Femminile
Rider (classification)	(New Zealand) Linda Villumsen (14th)
Victories	1 stage win

== UCI World Ranking ==
The team finished fifth in the UCI ranking for teams.

Individual world ranking
Rank	Rider	Points
4	(Italy) Giorgia Bronzini	614
