= 2013 Open de Suède Vårgårda TTT =

2013 Open de Suède Vårgårda Team time trial
2013 UCI Women's Road World Cup, race 6 of 8

Race details
- Dates: 16 August 2013
- Stages: 1
- Distance: 42.5 km (26.4 mi)
- Winning time: 53' 59.4"

Results
	Winner	Specialized–lululemon
	Second	Rabobank-Liv Giant
	Third	Orica–AIS

UCI Report

The 2013 Open de Suède Vårgårda – team time trial will be the 6th team time trial running on the Open de Suède Vårgårda and the 6th race of the 2013 UCI Women's Road World Cup season. It will be held on 16 August 2013 over a distance of 42.5 kilometres (26.4 miles).

== Preview ==
Only two teams have ever won a World Cup team time trial. These teams are Cervelo and Team Specialized–lululemon (both with various incarnations of their team names). After the introduction of the team time trial for trade teams at the UCI Road World Championships in 2012, this team time trial World Cup race is an important benchmark for the team time trial at the 2013 UCI Road World Championships. Specialized–lululemon, that won both the team time trial at the 2012 World Championships and the 2012 Vårgårda World Cup, is the main favourite for the victory. The important rival teams are Orica–AIS and Rabobank-Liv Giant, both medalists in 2012.

== The Route ==
The course is a 42.5 km from Vårgårda to Herrljunga and back in and is mainly flat with one small climb after 35 km of an ascent of 40 metres in 2 km. The route is a challenging course including several tight corners and narrow roads. Crosswinds could be an important factor between Vårgårda and Herrljunga and on the bridge on Kullingsleden after 32.5 km.

== Race ==
A maximum of 25 UCI Women's Teams and National Teams between 4 and 6 riders are allowed to start. Starting order of the teams will be the reverse order from UCI Road women World Cup standing after the previous World Cup race, the 2013 Tour of Chongming Island World Cup. The first team will start at 17:30 and the next teams with 3 minutes intervals. The final time will be the time of the fourth rider crossing the finish line.

== Results (top 10) ==
	Team	Cyclists	Time	Team World Cup points	Riders World Cup points
1	Specialized–lululemon	Ellen van Dijk (NED); Evelyn Stevens (USA); Lisa Brennauer (GER); Trixi Worrack (GER); Carmen Small (USA) (+ 3' 46"); Loren Rowney (AUS) (DNF)	53' 59.4"	140	35
2	Rabobank-Liv Giant	Marianne Vos (NED); Annemiek van Vleuten (NED); Thalita de Jong (NED); Lucinda Brand (NED); Pauline Ferrand-Prévot (FRA) (+ 3"); Roxane Knetemann (NED) (+ 3' 44")	+ 38.2"	120	30
3	Orica–AIS	Emma Johansson (SWE); Amanda Spratt (AUS); Melissa Hoskins (AUS); Shara Gillow (AUS); Loes Gunnewijk (NED) (+ 5' 56"); Jessie MacLean (AUS) (+ 5' 56")	+ 1' 26.2"	100	25
4	Sengers Ladies Cycling Team	Anna van der Breggen (NED); Vera Koedooder (NED); Maaike Polspoel (NED); Christine Majerus (LUX); Julia Soek (NED) (+ 5' 07"); Evelyn Arys (BEL) (+ 5' 07")	+ 2' 34.4"	80	20
5	Wiggle–Honda	Charlotte Becker (GER); Dani King (GBR); Lauren Kitchen (AUS); Linda Villumsen (NZL); Emily Collins (NZL) (DNF); Beatrice Bartelloni (ITA) (DNF)	+ 2' 45.3"	64	16
6	RusVelo	Oxana Kozonchuk (RUS); Alexandra Burchenkova (RUS); Anastasia Chulkova (RUS); Aizhan Zhaparova (RUS); Elena Kuchinskaya (RUS) (+ 4"); Evgenia Romanyuta (RUS) (+ 10' 50")	+ 2' 47.7"	60	15
7	National Team Australia	Grace Sulzberger (AUS); Emily Roper (AUS); Amy Cure (AUS); Taryn Heather (AUS); Chloe McConville (AUS) (DNF); Ashlee Ankudinoff (AUS) (DNF)	+ 2' 57.3"	56	14
8	Boels–Dolmans Cycling Team	Adrie Visser (NED); Lizzie Armitstead (GBR); Jessie Daams (BEL); Romy Kasper (GER); Emma Trott (GBR) (DNF); Nina Kessler (NED) (DNF)	+ 3' 05.8"	52	13
9	Hitec Products UCK	Emilia Fahlin (SWE); Rossella Ratto (ITA); Rossella Johnsen (SWE); Rossella Leth (DEN); Emilie Moberg (NOR) (+ 2' 07"); Thea Thorsen (NOR) (DNF)	+ 3' 26.2"	48	12
10	Team TIBCO–To The Top	Thea Olds (USA); Claudia Häusler (GER); Chantal Blaak (NED); Jasmin Glaesser (CAN); Jasmin Stephens (USA) (+ 11' 27"); Melanie Späth (IRL) (+ 14' 15")	+ 3' 36.4"	44	11

== Points standings ==
=== Individuals ===
World Cup individual standings after 6 of 8 races.

	Cyclist	Team	World Cup points
1	Marianne Vos (NED)	Rabobank-Liv Giant	279
2	Emma Johansson (SWE)	Orica–AIS	202
3	Ellen van Dijk (NED)	Specialized–lululemon	194
4	Elisa Longo Borghini (ITA)	Hitec Products UCK	156
5	Anna van der Breggen (NED)	Sengers Ladies Cycling Team	96
6	Annemiek van Vleuten (NED)	Rabobank-Liv Giant	86
7	Tetyana Ryabchenko (UKR)	Chirio Forno d'Asolo	75
8	Giorgia Bronzini (ITA)	Wiggle–Honda	58
9	Lizzie Armitstead (GBR)	Boels–Dolmans Cycling Team	58
10	Amanda Spratt (AUS)	Orica–AIS	55

=== Teams ===
World Cup Team standings after 6 of 8 races.

Place	UCI Code	Team Name	World Cup Points
1	RBW	Rabobank-Liv Giant	449
2	GEW	Orica–AIS	377
3	SLU	Specialized–lululemon	339
4	HPU	Hitec Products UCK	258
5	SLT	Sengers Ladies Cycling Team	170
