= 2013 UCI Women's Road World Cup =

Series of bicycle races

- Sixteenth edition of the UCI Women's Road World Cup

Details
- Dates: 9 March – 31 August
- Location: Europe and China
- Races: 8

The 2013 UCI Women's Road World Cup is the 16th edition of the UCI Women's Road World Cup. The calendar retained the same races as the 2012 edition. Marianne Vos is the defending champion.

== Races ==
Round	Date	Race	Country	Winner	Second	Third
1	9 March	Ronde van Drenthe	Netherlands	Marianne Vos (NED)	Ellen van Dijk (NED)	Emma Johansson (SWE)
2	25 March	Trofeo Alfredo Binda-Comune di Cittiglio	Italy	Elisa Longo Borghini (ITA)	Emma Johansson (SWE)	Ellen van Dijk (NED)
3	31 March	Tour of Flanders	Belgium	Marianne Vos (NED)	Ellen van Dijk (NED)	Emma Johansson (SWE)
4	17 April	La Flèche Wallonne Féminine	Belgium	Marianne Vos (NED)	Elisa Longo Borghini (ITA)	Ashleigh Moolman (RSA)
5	12 May	Tour of Chongming Island World Cup	China	Tetyana Ryabchenko (UKR)	Giorgia Bronzini (ITA)	Amy Pieters (NED)
6	16 August	Open de Suède Vårgårda TTT	Sweden	Specialized–lululemon; Ellen van Dijk (NED); Evelyn Stevens (USA); Lisa Brennauer (GER); Trixi Worrack (GER); Carmen Small (USA) (+ 3' 46); Loren Rowney (AUS) (DNF)	Rabobank-Liv Giant; Marianne Vos (NED); Annemiek van Vleuten (NED); Thalita de Jong (NED); Lucinda Brand (NED); Pauline Ferrand-Prévot (FRA) (+ 3"); Roxane Knetemann (NED) (+ 3' 44")	Orica–AIS; Emma Johansson (SWE); Amanda Spratt (AUS); Melissa Hoskins (AUS); Shara Gillow (AUS); Loes Gunnewijk (NED) (+ 5' 56"); Jessie MacLean (AUS) (+ 5' 56")
7	18 August	Open de Suède Vårgårda	Sweden	Marianne Vos (NED)	Emma Johansson (SWE)	Amy Pieters (NED)
8	31 August	GP de Plouay	France	Marianne Vos (NED)	Emma Johansson (SWE)	Anna van der Breggen (NED)

== Points standings ==
=== Individuals ===
World Cup individual standings after 8 of 8 races.

	Cyclist	Team	World Cup points
1	Marianne Vos (NED)	Rabobank-Liv Giant	429
2	Emma Johansson (SWE)	Orica–AIS	302
3	Ellen van Dijk (NED)	Specialized–lululemon	224
4	Anna van der Breggen (NED)	Sengers Ladies Cycling Team	158
5	Elisa Longo Borghini (ITA)	Hitec Products UCK	156
6	Annemiek van Vleuten (NED)	Rabobank-Liv Giant	101
7	Amy Pieters (NED)	Argos-Shimano	80
8	Tetyana Ryabchenko (UKR)	Chirio Forno d'Asolo	75
9	Giorgia Bronzini (ITA)	Wiggle–Honda	69
10	Evelyn Stevens (USA)	Specialized–lululemon	60

=== Teams ===
World Cup Team standings after 8 of 8 races.

Place	UCI Code	Team Name	World Cup Points
1	RBW	Rabobank-Liv Giant	695
2	GEW	Orica–AIS	500
3	SLU	Specialized–lululemon	394
4	HPU	Hitec Products UCK	291
5	SLT	Sengers Ladies Cycling Team	239

== See also ==
- 2013 in women's road cycling
