= 2013 UCI Road World Championships – Women's time trial =

Women's time trial
2013 UCI Road World Championships
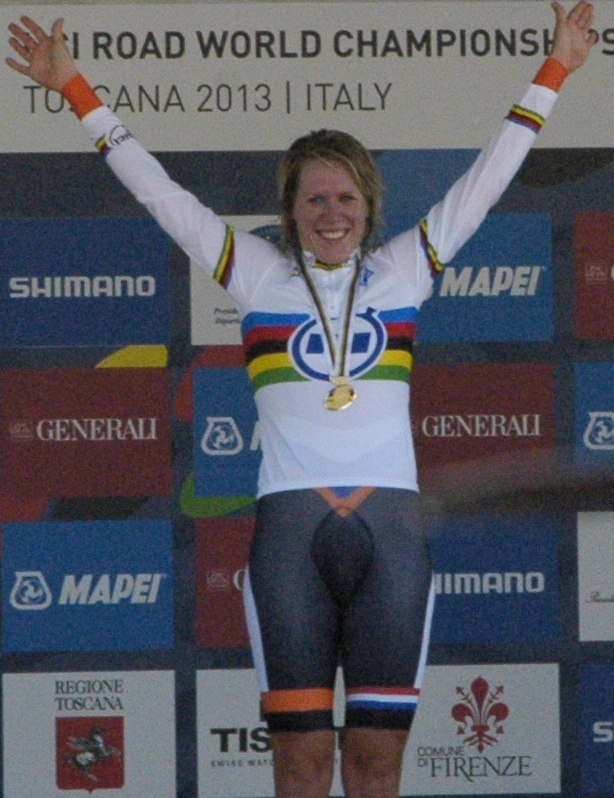
- Winner Ellen van Dijk

Race details
- Dates: 24 September 2013
- Stages: 1
- Distance: 22.05 km (13.70 mi)
- Winning time: 27' 48"

Medalists
	Gold	Ellen van Dijk (NED)
	Silver	Linda Villumsen (NZL)
	Bronze	Carmen Small (USA)

Full re-run Highlights Interview Ellen van Dijk

The Women's time trial of the 2013 UCI Road World Championships took place on 24 September 2013 in the region of Tuscany, Italy. The course of the race was 22.05 km from Parco delle Cascine to the Nelson Mandela Forum in Florence.

Ellen van Dijk from the Netherlands lived up to expectations as the favourite and won the time trial by dominating the race, beating perennial podium finisher Linda Villumsen and the surprising American Carmen Small.

== Qualification ==
All National Federations may enter 4 riders of whom 2 may start. Besides of that, the outgoing World Champion and the continental champions may take part in addition to this number.

Champion	Name	Note
Outgoing World Champion	Judith Arndt (GER)	Did not participate (retired)
African Champion	Ashleigh Moolman (RSA)	Did not participate
American Champion	Íngrid Drexel (MEX)	Did not participate
Asian Champion	Tüvshinjargalyn Enkhjargal (MGL)	
European Champion (under-23)	Hanna Solovey (UKR)	
Oceanian Champion	Taryn Heather (AUS)	Did not participate

== Participating nations ==
32 nations participated in the women's time trial.

- Australia
- Austria
- Belgium
- Belarus
- Brazil
- Canada
- Colombia
- Croatia
- Denmark
- Spain
- Finland
- France
- Germany
- Italy
- Jordan
- Japan
- Latvia
- Lithuania
- Mexico
- Mongolia
- Netherlands
- Norway
- New Zealand
- Poland
- Russia
- Slovenia
- Switzerland
- Sweden
- Thailand
- Uganda
- Ukraine
- United States

== Preview ==
Ellen van Dijk, the Dutch National time trial Champion and the number 5 in the time trial at the 2012 UCI Road World Championships was the absolute favourite. She won many time trials in the 2013 women's road season. Of the 10 time trials she rode she won eight of them including the time trial at the prestigious Giro d'Italia Femminile and a week before the championships the Chrono Champenois – Trophée Européen. Van Dijk did not win two time trials, Emma Johansson from Sweden beat her in the Emakumeen Euskal Bira and Shara Gillow from Australia in the Thüringen Rundfahrt der Frauen.

Hanna Solovey, a Ukrainian track cyslint, won the time trial at the European Road Championships, the only race she rode before the World Championships. With an average speed of over 47 km/h it was the fastest average speed in a time trial of the season. Linda Villumsen, who was on the podium in the last four editions, and Evelyn Stevens were other podium candidates.

== Schedule ==
Date	Time	Event
24 September 2013	14:30-16:30	Women's time trial
24 September 2013	16:50	Victory ceremony

== Race ==
Danish mountain biker Annika Langvad, who finished 6th in the end, was the early leader after setting a time of 28' 27" and stayed in the hot seat for a long time. German Trixi Worrack, the first of the final 10 riders to finish, took over the lead after finishing in a time of 28' 19". The main favourites started last and showed some fast intermediate times at the two intermediate time points after 12.7 kilometres (7.9 miles) and 17.1 kilometres (10.6 miles). The Dutch Ellen van Dijk was the fastest from the start by riding 20 second faster than Linda Villumsen and 24 seconds faster than Carmen Small at the first time point. At the second split the gaps were 25 and 28 seconds respectively. Van Dijk lost one second to Villumsen in the final five kilometres but her margin was large enough to win her second world title of the championship after winning the team time trial with her Specialized–lululemon squad on Sunday. For Villumsen it was her fifth consecutive time on the world championship time trial podium, but never won the rainbow jersey.

== Medalists reactions ==
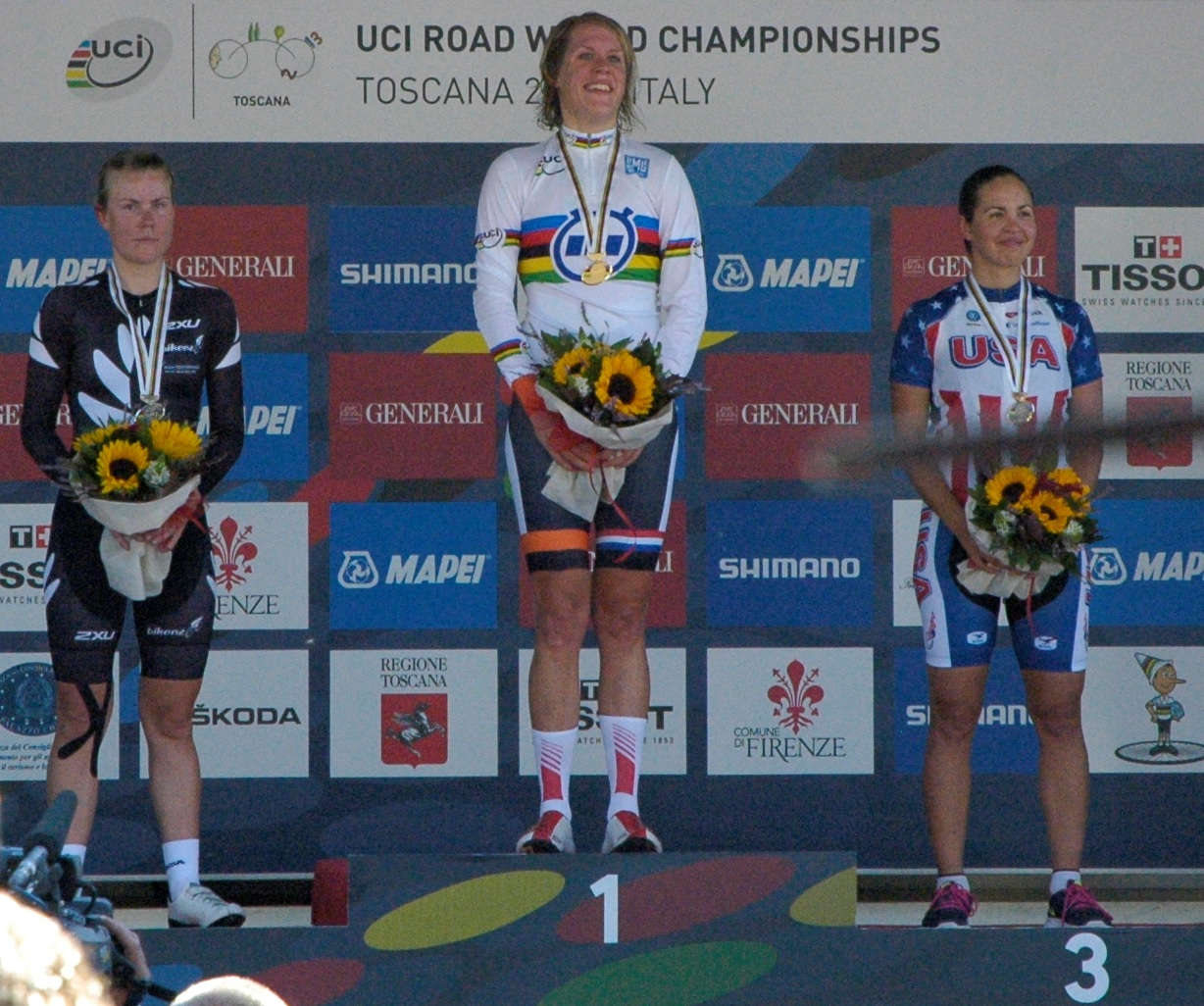
The podium: 1) Ellen van Dijk (NED) 2) Linda Villumsen (NZL) 3) Carmen Small (USA)

Ellen van Dijk (Netherlands)

Van Dijk lived up the expectations as main favourite and won the time trial by dominating the race. "I'm super happy. It's difficult to describe how I feel now", she said after the race. "I'm so excited because I dreamt so long of this one and the pressure was high to finish it off. It's great to have won. My intention was to start fast but I wanted to keep going a bit longer than I did. I maybe got over excited and a went too fast, but I maintained the time difference and so it was all ok." This race was the seasons' main goal for Van Dijk. She had been tested on her time trial position during the season and found a better position which she was able to maintain for almost half an hour. Van Dijk told she practiced the course twice in August at 5:00am to avoid traffic and made video recordings of the course to get to know the turns. She had watched the video over and over again until she could dream it.

Linda Villumsen (New Zealand)

Villumsen rode the New Zealand National Time Trial Championships in January before backing off until June. She rode the Giro Rosa and won La Route de France and the time trial at the Tour Cycliste Féminin International de l'Ardèche before heading to World Championships. "It was a different year for me but a good year." She said in an interview. "I started late and with a different approach. I trained more at home and then did race after race. I enjoyed it. I was still there on the podium so I can thank my team for helping me this far." Villumsen, a former a Danish national road race champion, switched her nationality in 2010 from Danish to New Zealand. It was her fifth straight podium at the world championships in the time trial. She took her first bronze in 2009, 2010 and 2012, and won silver in her former home country in 2011. "It's not bad luck." Villumsen said. "If someone is better, they deserve to win. Ellen van Dijk has been riding very well all throughout the year, she has won all kinds of time trials, short ones, long ones. She really deserved to win. A place on the podium is still nice. I go close every year but something is missing. I'll try to work it out and go all the way to the top perhaps next year."

Carmen Small (United States)

Small, American national time trial champions, considered retirement in 2012 before signing by Specialized–lululemon. She won her first medal at the World Championships. "I’m pretty surprised, I didn’t expect to actually podium. I thought top five would be a really good ride for me. Jim Miller (USA Cycling vice president of athletics) and I met before and I really wanted Jim in the car talking to me because he was in the car at Nationals with me when I won. I just buried myself in the last 500 meters. I knew it was going to hurt, but it hurts for everyone. With 100 meters to go I wanted to quit, but I did one more click down on my gears and I just counted the pedal strokes to get me to the finish. This hurt worse than I’ve ever hurt before." She also felt sorry for Evelyn Stevens who missed a place on the podium by 0.04 seconds. "It's a very bittersweet feeling for me. Evelyn is a good friend, a teammate and a fellow countryman. We've spent a lot of time together this season and it's hard to have been beaten and have it be so close".

== Final classification ==
Of the 48 riders on the starting list, 3 riders did not start.

Rank	Rider	Country	Time
1	Ellen van Dijk	Netherlands	27' 48"
1	Linda Villumsen	New Zealand	+ 24"
1	Carmen Small	United States	+ 28"
4	Evelyn Stevens	United States	+ 28"
5	Trixi Worrack	Germany	+ 31"
6	Annika Langvad	Denmark	+ 39"
7	Olga Zabelinskaya	Russia	+ 40"
8	Hanna Solovey	Ukraine	+ 42"
9	Tatiana Antoshina	Russia	+ 42"
10	Emma Johansson	Sweden	+ 52"
11	Lisa Brennauer	Germany	+ 1' 04"
12	Shara Gillow	Australia	+ 1' 20"
13	Elisa Longo Borghini	Italy	+ 1' 23"
14	Loes Gunnewijk	Netherlands	+ 1' 24"
15	Inga Čilvinaitė	Lithuania	+ 1' 42"
16	Eugenia Bujak	Poland	+ 1' 48"
17	Rossella Ratto	Italy	+ 1' 55"
18	Audrey Cordon	France	+ 1' 55"
19	Joëlle Numainville	Canada	+ 1' 58"
20	Cecilie Gotaas Johnsen	Norway	+ 2' 01"
21	Jutta Stienen	Switzerland	+ 2' 04"
22	Valeriya Kononenko	Ukraine	+ 2' 06"
23	Mélodie Lesueur	France	+ 2' 07"
24	Denise Ramsden	Canada	+ 2' 18"
25	Thea Thorsen	Norway	+ 2' 18"
26	Latoya Brulee	Belgium	+ 2' 22"
27	Eri Yonamine	Japan	+ 2' 27"
28	Mia Radotić	Croatia	+ 2' 29"
29	Martina Ritter	Austria	+ 2' 30"
30	Emilia Fahlin	Sweden	+ 2' 31"
31	Leire Olaberría	Spain	+ 2' 47"
32	Kataržina Sosna	Lithuania	+ 2' 52"
33	Ana Teresa Casas Bonilla	Mexico	+ 2' 57"
34	Tüvshinjargalyn Enkhjargal	Mongolia	+ 3' 05"
35	Sari Saarelainen	Finland	+ 3' 09"
36	Alena Sitsko	Belarus	+ 3' 09"
37	Anna Sanchis Chafer	Spain	+ 3' 12"
38	Jacqueline Hahn	Austria	+ 3' 14"
39	Vita Heine	Latvia	+ 3' 17"
40	Sara Frece	Slovenia	+ 3' 02"
41	Clemilda Fernandes	Brazil	+ 3' 34"
42	Nontasin Chanpeng	Thailand	+ 4' 09"
43	Alenka Novak	Slovenia	+ 5' 00"
44	Supaksorn Nuntana	Thailand	+ 5' 30"
45	Samah Khaled	Jordan	+ 6' 32"
DNS	Lorena María Vargas Villamil	Colombia	-
DNS	Aisha Kiwanuka Peace	Uganda	-
DNS	Rebecca Nalubega	Uganda	-
