= 2013 Giro d'Italia Femminile =

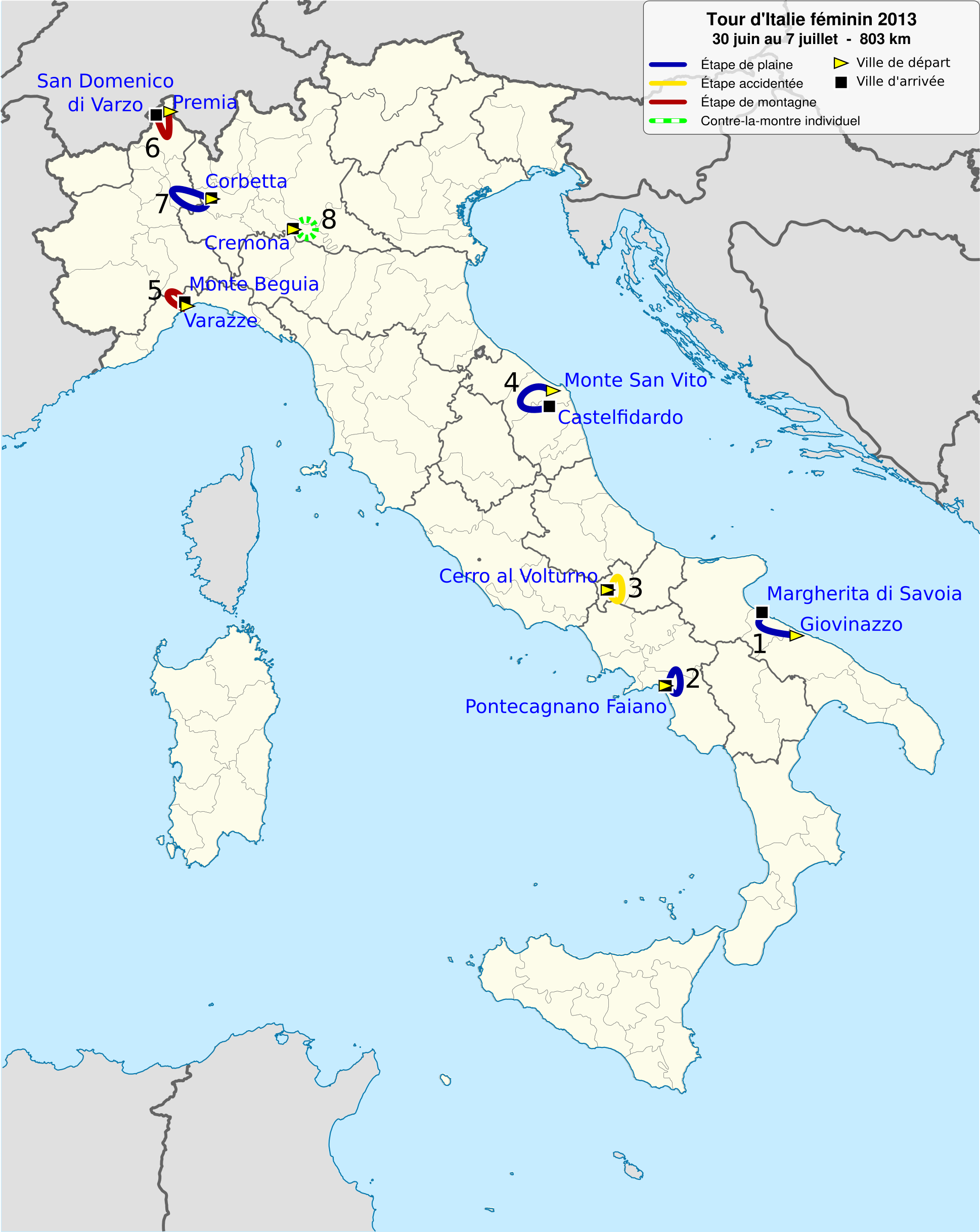

Race details
- Dates: 30 June–7 July 2013
- Stages: 8
- Distance: 803 km (499 mi)
- Winning time: 20h 30' 15"

Results
| Jersey awarded to the overall winner | Winner | Mara Abbott (USA) | (USA National Team) |
| | Second | Tatiana Guderzo (ITA) | (MCipollini–Giordana) |
| | Third | Claudia Häusler (GER) | (Team TIBCO–To The Top) |
| Jersey awarded to the points classification winner | Points | Marianne Vos (NED) | (Rabobank-Liv Giant) |
| Jersey awarded to the mountains classification winner | Mountains | Mara Abbott (USA) | (USA National Team) |
| Jersey awarded to the youth classification winner | Youth | Francesca Cauz (ITA) | (Top Girls Fassa Bortolo) |

Stage 1 Stage 2 Stage 3 Stage 4 Stage 5 Stage 6 pt 1 Stage 6 pt 2 Stage 6 pt 3 Stage 6 pt 4 Stage 7 pt 1 Stage 7 pt 2 Stage 7 pt 3 Stage 7 pt 4 Stage 8 pt 1 Stage 8 pt 2 Stage 8 pt 3 Stage 8 pt 4

The 2013 Giro d'Italia Femminile, also known as the 2013 Giro Rosa, was the 24th consecutive Giro d'Italia Femminile, the most prestigious Italian stage race in the women's road cycling calendar for 2013. It was held over eight stages between 30 June and 7 July 2013, starting in Giovinazzo, Apulia, and finishing with an individual time trial in Cremona, Lombardy.

The race was won by American Mara Abbott riding for the United States national cycling team.

== Teams ==
| Rabobank-Liv Giant Specialized–lululemon Orica–AIS Team Hitec Products Pasta Zara–Cogeas Boels–Dolmans RusVelo Be Pink MCipollini–Giordana Lotto–Belisol Ladies | Wiggle–Honda Faren–Kuota S.C. Michela Fanini Rox Vaiano Fondriest Bizkaia–Durango Top Girls Fassa Bortolo Chirio Forno d'Asolo Team TIBCO–To The Top Dutch National Team USA National Team |

== Route ==
Stages
| Stage | Date | Course | Distance | Type | Winner |
|---|---|---|---|---|---|
| 1 | 30 June | Giovinazzo to Margherita de Savioa | 117.8 km (73.2 mi) | Flat stage | Kirsten Wild (NED) |
| 2 | 1 July | Pontecagnano Faiano to Pontecagnano Faiano | 99.6 km (61.9 mi) | Hilly stage | Giorgia Bronzini (ITA) |
| 3 | 2 July | Cerro al Volturno to Cerro al Volturno | 111.6 km (69.3 mi) | Hilly stage | Marianne Vos (NED) |
| 4 | 3 July | Monte San Vito to Castelfidardo | 137.2 km (85.3 mi) | Flat stage | Marianne Vos (NED) |
| 5 | 4 July | Varazze to Monte Beigua | 73.3 km (45.5 mi) | Mountain stage | Mara Abbott (USA) |
| 6 | 5 July | Terme di Premia to San Domenico | 121 km (75 mi) | Mountain stage | Mara Abbott (USA) |
| 7 | 6 July | Corbetta to Corbetta | 120 km (75 mi) | Flat stage | Marianne Vos (NED) |
| 8 | 7 July | Cremona | 16.7 km (10.4 mi) | Individual time trial | Ellen van Dijk (NED) |
| Total | | | 803 km (499 mi) | | |

== Stages ==
=== Stage 1 ===
30 June 2013 – Giovinazzo to Margherita de Savioa, 117.8 km (73.2 mi)

Stage 1 result

| | Rider | Team | Time |
|---|---|---|---|
| 1 | Kirsten Wild (NED) | Dutch National Team | 2h 53' 55" |
| 2 | Marianne Vos (NED) | Rabobank-Liv Giant | s.t. |
| 3 | Marta Tagliaferro (ITA) | MCipollini–Giordana | s.t. |
| 4 | Edita Janeliūnaitė (LTU) | Pasta Zara–Cogeas | s.t. |
| 5 | Oxana Kozonchuk (RUS) | RusVelo | s.t. |
| 6 | Annemiek van Vleuten (NED) | Rabobank-Liv Giant | s.t. |
| 7 | Shelley Olds (USA) | Team TIBCO–To The Top | s.t. |
| 8 | Lauren Tucker (USA) | USA National Team | s.t. |
| 9 | Lauren Kitchen (AUS) | Wiggle–Honda | s.t. |
| 10 | Anna Trevisi (ITA) | Vaiano Fondriest | s.t. |

General classification after stage 1

| | Rider | Team | Time |
|---|---|---|---|
| 1 | Marianne Vos (NED) | Rabobank-Liv Giant | 2h 53' 43" |
| 2 | Kirsten Wild (NED) | Dutch National Team | + 2" |
| 3 | Marta Tagliaferro (ITA) | MCipollini–Giordana | + 8" |
| 4 | Adrie Visser (NED) | Boels–Dolmans | + 10" |
| 5 | Julie Leth (DEN) | Team Hitec Products | + 10" |
| 6 | Cecilie Gotaas Johnsen (NOR) | Team Hitec Products | + 11" |
| 7 | Aizhan Zhaparova (RUS) | RusVelo | + 11" |
| 8 | Edita Janeliūnaitė (LTU) | Pasta Zara–Cogeas | + 12" |
| 9 | Oxana Kozonchuk (RUS) | RusVelo | + 12" |
| 10 | Annemiek van Vleuten (NED) | Rabobank-Liv Giant | + 12" |

=== Stage 2 ===
1 July 2013 – Pontecagnano Faiano to Pontecagnano Faiano, 99.6 km (61.9 mi)

Stage 2 result

| | Rider | Team | Time |
|---|---|---|---|
| 1 | Giorgia Bronzini (ITA) | Wiggle–Honda | 2h 34' 03" |
| 2 | Marianne Vos (NED) | Rabobank-Liv Giant | s.t. |
| 3 | Barbara Gaurischi (ITA) | Vaiano Fondriest | s.t. |
| 4 | Lauren Tucker (USA) | USA National Team | s.t. |
| 5 | Emily Collins (NZL) | Wiggle–Honda | s.t. |
| 6 | Pauline Ferrand-Prévot (FRA) | Rabobank-Liv Giant | s.t. |
| 7 | Oxana Kozonchuk (RUS) | RusVelo | s.t. |
| 8 | Cecilie Gotaas Johnsen (NOR) | Team Hitec Products | s.t. |
| 9 | Alena Amialiusik (BLR) | Be Pink | s.t. |
| 10 | Marta Tagliaferro (ITA) | MCipollini–Giordana | s.t. |

General classification after stage 2

| | Rider | Team | Time |
|---|---|---|---|
| 1 | Marianne Vos (NED) | Rabobank-Liv Giant | 5h 27' 37" |
| 2 | Marta Tagliaferro (ITA) | MCipollini–Giordana | + 17" |
| 3 | Barbara Guarischi (ITA) | Vaiano Fondriest | + 17" |
| 4 | Julie Leth (DEN) | Team Hitec Products | + 17" |
| 5 | Adrie Visser (NED) | Boels–Dolmans | + 19" |
| 6 | Pauline Ferrand-Prévot (FRA) | Rabobank-Liv Giant | + 20" |
| 7 | Cecilie Gotaas Johnsen (NOR) | Team Hitec Products | + 20" |
| 8 | Lauren Tucker (USA) | USA National Team | + 21" |
| 9 | Oxana Kozonchuk (RUS) | RusVelo | + 21" |
| 10 | Alena Amialiusik (BLR) | Be Pink | + 21" |

=== Stage 3 ===
2 July 2013 – Cerro al Volturno to Cerro al Volturno, 111.6 km (69.3 mi)

Stage 3 result

| | Rider | Team | Time |
|---|---|---|---|
| 1 | Marianne Vos (NED) | Rabobank-Liv Giant | 2h 49' 44" |
| 2 | Claudia Häusler (GER) | Team TIBCO–To The Top | + 45" |
| 3 | Tatiana Guderzo (ITA) | MCipollini–Giordana | + 45" |
| 4 | Fabiana Luerpini (ITA) | Faren–Kuota | + 48" |
| 5 | Rossella Ratto (ITA) | Team Hitec Products | + 50" |
| 6 | Ashleigh Moolman (RSA) | Lotto–Belisol Ladies | + 55" |
| 7 | Evelyn Stevens (USA) | Specialized–lululemon | + 55" |
| 8 | Anna van der Breggen (NED) | Dutch National Team | + 58" |
| 9 | Mara Abbott (USA) | USA National Team | + 58" |
| 10 | Shara Gillow (AUS) | Orica–AIS | + 1' 02" |

General classification after stage 3

| | Rider | Team | Time |
|---|---|---|---|
| 1 | Marianne Vos (NED) | Rabobank-Liv Giant | 8h 17' 08" |
| 2 | Claudia Häusler (GER) | Team TIBCO–To The Top | + 1' 13" |
| 3 | Tatiana Guderzo (ITA) | MCipollini–Giordana | + 1' 15" |
| 4 | Fabiana Luerpini (ITA) | Faren–Kuota | + 1' 22" |
| 5 | Rossella Ratto (ITA) | Team Hitec Products | + 1' 24" |
| 6 | Ashleigh Moolman (RSA) | Lotto–Belisol Ladies | + 1' 29" |
| 7 | Evelyn Stevens (USA) | Specialized–lululemon | + 1' 29" |
| 8 | Anna van der Breggen (NED) | Dutch National Team | + 1' 32" |
| 9 | Mara Abbott (USA) | USA National Team | + 1' 32" |
| 10 | Francesca Cauz (ITA) | Top Girls Fassa Bortolo | + 1' 36" |

=== Stage 4 ===
3 July 2013 – Monte San Vito to Castelfidardo, 137.2 km (85.3 mi)

Stage 4 result

| | Rider | Team | Time |
|---|---|---|---|
| 1 | Marianne Vos (NED) | Rabobank-Liv Giant | 3h 14' 28" |
| 2 | Evelyn Stevens (USA) | Specialized–lululemon | + 3" |
| 3 | Ashleigh Moolman (RSA) | Lotto–Belisol Ladies | + 3" |
| 4 | Tatiana Guderzo (ITA) | MCipollini–Giordana | + 3" |
| 5 | Claudia Häusler (GER) | Team TIBCO–To The Top | + 7" |
| 6 | Anna van der Breggen (NED) | Dutch National Team | + 9" |
| 7 | Fabiana Luperini (ITA) | Faren–Kuota | + 9" |
| 8 | Francesca Cauz (ITA) | Top Girls Fassa Bortolo | + 18" |
| 9 | Tiffany Cromwell (AUS) | Orica–AIS | + 20" |
| 10 | Mara Abbott (USA) | USA National Team | + 20" |

General classification after stage 4

| | Rider | Team | Time |
|---|---|---|---|
| 1 | Marianne Vos (NED) | Rabobank-Liv Giant | 11h 31' 23" |
| 2 | Tatiana Guderzo (ITA) | MCipollini–Giordana | + 1' 31" |
| 3 | Claudia Häusler (GER) | Team TIBCO–To The Top | + 1' 33" |
| 4 | Evelyn Stevens (USA) | Specialized–lululemon | + 1' 39" |
| 5 | Ashleigh Moolman (RSA) | Lotto–Belisol Ladies | + 1' 41" |
| 6 | Fabiana Luperini (ITA) | Faren–Kuota | + 1' 44" |
| 7 | Anna van der Breggen (NED) | Dutch National Team | + 1' 54" |
| 8 | Rossella Ratto (ITA) | Team Hitec Products | + 2' 03" |
| 9 | Mara Abbott (USA) | USA National Team | + 2' 05" |
| 10 | Francesca Cauz (ITA) | Top Girls Fassa Bortolo | + 2' 07" |

=== Stage 5 ===
4 July 2013 – Varazze to Monte Beigua, 73.3 km (45.5 mi)

Stage 5 result

| | Rider | Team | Time |
|---|---|---|---|
| 1 | Mara Abbott (USA) | USA National Team | 2h 25' 25" |
| 2 | Francesca Cauz (ITA) | Top Girls Fassa Bortolo | + 1' 44" |
| 3 | Fabiana Luperini (ITA) | Faren–Kuota | + 1' 49" |
| 4 | Tatiana Guderzo (ITA) | MCipollini–Giordana | + 1' 51" |
| 5 | Shara Gillow (AUS) | Orica–AIS | + 2' 38" |
| 6 | Claudia Häusler (GER) | Team TIBCO–To The Top | + 2' 49" |
| 7 | Yevheniya Vysotska (UKR) | S.C. Michela Fanini Rox | + 3' 02" |
| 8 | Alena Amialiusik (BLR) | Be Pink | + 3' 45" |
| 9 | Ashleigh Moolman (RSA) | Lotto–Belisol Ladies | + 3' 51" |
| 10 | Evelyn Stevens (USA) | Specialized–lululemon | + 3' 51" |

General classification after stage 5

| | Rider | Team | Time |
|---|---|---|---|
| 1 | Mara Abbott (USA) | USA National Team | 13h 58' 43" |
| 2 | Tatiana Guderzo (ITA) | MCipollini–Giordana | + 1' 27" |
| 3 | Fabiana Luperini (ITA) | Faren–Kuota | + 1' 34" |
| 4 | Claudia Häusler (GER) | Team TIBCO–To The Top | + 2' 27" |
| 5 | Francesca Cauz (ITA) | Top Girls Fassa Bortolo | + 2' 30" |
| 6 | Shara Gillow (AUS) | Orica–AIS | + 2' 54" |
| 7 | Marianne Vos (NED) | Rabobank-Liv Giant | + 3' 20" |
| 8 | Evelyn Stevens (USA) | Specialized–lululemon | + 3' 35" |
| 9 | Ashleigh Moolman (RSA) | Lotto–Belisol Ladies | + 3' 37" |
| 10 | Yevheniya Vysotska (UKR) | S.C. Michela Fanini Rox | + 3' 39" |

=== Stage 6 ===
5 July 2013 – Terme di Premia to San Domenico, 121 km (75.2 mi)

Stage 6 result

| | Rider | Team | Time |
|---|---|---|---|
| 1 | Mara Abbott (USA) | USA National Team | 3h 16' 01" |
| 2 | Claudia Häusler (GER) | Team TIBCO–To The Top | + 24" |
| 3 | Francesca Cauz (ITA) | Top Girls Fassa Bortolo | + 34" |
| 4 | Fabiana Luperini (ITA) | Faren–Kuota | + 41" |
| 5 | Tatiana Guderzo (ITA) | MCipollini–Giordana | + 1' 03" |
| 6 | Evelyn Stevens (USA) | Specialized–lululemon | + 1' 32" |
| 7 | Marianne Vos (NED) | Rabobank-Liv Giant | + 1' 39" |
| 8 | Shara Gillow (AUS) | Orica–AIS | + 1' 46" |
| 9 | Ashleigh Moolman (RSA) | Lotto–Belisol Ladies | + 1' 52" |
| 10 | Yevheniya Vysotska (UKR) | S.C. Michela Fanini Rox | + 1' 53" |

General classification after stage 6

| | Rider | Team | Time |
|---|---|---|---|
| 1 | Mara Abbott (USA) | USA National Team | 17h 14' 34" |
| 2 | Fabiana Luperini (ITA) | Faren–Kuota | + 2' 25" |
| 3 | Tatiana Guderzo (ITA) | MCipollini–Giordana | + 2' 40" |
| 4 | Claudia Häusler (GER) | Team TIBCO–To The Top | + 2' 55" |
| 5 | Francesca Cauz (ITA) | Top Girls Fassa Bortolo | + 3' 10" |
| 6 | Shara Gillow (AUS) | Orica–AIS | + 4' 50" |
| 7 | Marianne Vos (NED) | Rabobank-Liv Giant | + 5' 09" |
| 8 | Evelyn Stevens (USA) | Specialized–lululemon | + 5' 17" |
| 9 | Ashleigh Moolman (RSA) | Lotto–Belisol Ladies | + 5' 39" |
| 10 | Yevheniya Vysotska (UKR) | S.C. Michela Fanini Rox | + 5' 42" |

=== Stage 7 ===
6 July 2013 – Corbetta to Corbetta, 120 km (74.6 mi)

Stage 7 result

| | Rider | Team | Time |
|---|---|---|---|
| 1 | Marianne Vos (NED) | Rabobank-Liv Giant | 2h 52' 07" |
| 2 | Giorgia Bronzini (ITA) | Wiggle–Honda | s.t. |
| 3 | Shelley Olds (USA) | Team TIBCO–To The Top | s.t. |
| 4 | Kirsten Wild (NED) | Dutch National Team | s.t. |
| 5 | Barbara Guarischi (ITA) | Vaiano Fondriest | s.t. |
| 6 | Marta Tagliaferro (ITA) | MCipollini–Giordana | s.t. |
| 7 | Oxana Kozonchuk (RUS) | RusVelo | s.t. |
| 8 | Alena Amialiusik (BLR) | Be Pink | s.t. |
| 9 | Giada Borgato (ITA) | Pasta Zara–Cogeas | s.t. |
| 10 | Melissa Hoskins (AUS) | Orica–AIS | s.t. |

General classification after stage 7

| | Rider | Team | Time |
|---|---|---|---|
| 1 | Mara Abbott (USA) | USA National Team | 20h 06' 50" |
| 2 | Tatiana Guderzo (ITA) | MCipollini–Giordana | + 2' 28" |
| 3 | Claudia Häusler (GER) | Team TIBCO–To The Top | + 2' 52" |
| 4 | Francesca Cauz (ITA) | Top Girls Fassa Bortolo | + 3' 01" |
| 5 | Marianne Vos (NED) | Rabobank-Liv Giant | + 4' 50" |
| 6 | Shara Gillow (AUS) | Orica–AIS | + 4' 50" |
| 7 | Evelyn Stevens (USA) | Specialized–lululemon | + 5' 17" |
| 8 | Ashleigh Moolman (RSA) | Lotto–Belisol Ladies | + 5' 39" |
| 9 | Yevheniya Vysotska (UKR) | S.C. Michela Fanini Rox | + 5' 42" |
| 10 | Alena Amialiusik (BLR) | Be Pink | + 7' 42" |

=== Stage 8 ===
7 July 2013 – Cremona to Cremona (individual time trial), 16.7 km (10.4 mi)

Stage 8 result

| | Rider | Team | Time |
|---|---|---|---|
| 1 | Ellen van Dijk (NED) | Specialized–lululemon | 21' 12" |
| 2 | Evelyn Stevens (USA) | Specialized–lululemon | + 35" |
| 3 | Shara Gillow (AUS) | Orica–AIS | + 53" |
| 4 | Pauline Ferrand-Prévot (FRA) | Rabobank-Liv Giant | + 58" |
| 5 | Linda Villumsen (DEN) | Wiggle–Honda | + 1' 02" |
| 6 | Tayler Wiles (USA) | Specialized–lululemon | + 1' 10" |
| 7 | Loes Gunnewijk (NED) | Orica–AIS | + 1' 11" |
| 8 | Anna van der Breggen (NED) | Dutch National Team | + 1' 14" |
| 9 | Alexandra Burchenkova (RUS) | RusVelo | + 1' 15" |
| 10 | Carmen Small (USA) | Specialized–lululemon | + 1' 17" |

General classification after stage 8

| | Rider | Team | Time |
|---|---|---|---|
| 1 | Mara Abbott (USA) | USA National Team | 20h 30' 15" |
| 2 | Tatiana Guderzo (ITA) | MCipollini–Giordana | + 1' 33" |
| 3 | Claudia Häusler (GER) | Team TIBCO–To The Top | + 2' 18" |
| 4 | Shara Gillow (AUS) | Orica–AIS | + 3' 29" |
| 5 | Evelyn Stevens (USA) | Specialized–lululemon | + 3' 39" |
| 6 | Marianne Vos (NED) | Rabobank-Liv Giant | + 4' 08" |
| 7 | Francesca Cauz (ITA) | Top Girls Fassa Bortolo | + 4' 25" |
| 8 | Ashleigh Moolman (RSA) | Lotto–Belisol Ladies | + 5' 23" |
| 9 | Yevheniya Vysotska (UKR) | S.C. Michela Fanini Rox | + 6' 48" |
| 10 | Alena Amialiusik (BLR) | Be Pink | + 7' 25" |

== Classification leadership ==
| Stage | Winner | General classification | Points classification | Mountains classification | Young rider classification | Italian rider classification |
|---|---|---|---|---|---|---|
| 1 | Kirsten Wild | Marianne Vos | Kirsten Wild | Valentina Scandolara | Julie Leth | Marta Tagliaferro |
| 2 | Giorgia Bronzini | Marianne Vos | Marianne Vos | Valentina Scandolara | Barbara Guarischi | Marta Tagliaferro |
| 3 | Marianne Vos | Marianne Vos | Marianne Vos | Valentina Scandolara | Rossella Ratto | Tatiana Guderzo |
| 4 | Marianne Vos | Marianne Vos | Marianne Vos | Marianne Vos | Anna van der Breggen | Tatiana Guderzo |
| 5 | Mara Abbott | Mara Abbott | Marianne Vos | Tiffany Cromwell | Francesca Cauz | Tatiana Guderzo |
| 6 | Mara Abbott | Mara Abbott | Marianne Vos | Mara Abbott | Francesca Cauz | Tatiana Guderzo |
| 7 | Marianne Vos | Mara Abbott | Marianne Vos | Mara Abbott | Francesca Cauz | Tatiana Guderzo |
| 8 | Ellen van Dijk | Mara Abbott | Marianne Vos | Mara Abbott | Francesca Cauz | Tatiana Guderzo |
| Final | | Mara Abbott | Marianne Vos | Mara Abbott | Francesca Cauz | Tatiana Guderzo |

== Classification standings ==
=== General classification ===
| | Rider | Team | Time |
|---|---|---|---|
| 1 | Mara Abbott (USA) | USA National Team | 20h 30' 15" |
| 2 | Tatiana Guderzo (ITA) | MCipollini–Giordana | + 1' 33" |
| 3 | Claudia Häusler (GER) | Team TIBCO–To The Top | + 2' 18" |
| 4 | Shara Gillow (AUS) | Orica–AIS | + 3' 29" |
| 5 | Evelyn Stevens (USA) | Specialized–lululemon | + 3' 39" |
| 6 | Marianne Vos (NED) | Rabobank-Liv Giant | + 4' 08" |
| 7 | Francesca Cauz (ITA) | Top Girls Fassa Bortolo | + 4' 25" |
| 8 | Ashleigh Moolman (RSA) | Lotto–Belisol Ladies | + 5' 23" |
| 9 | Yevheniya Vysotska (UKR) | S.C. Michela Fanini Rox | + 6' 48" |
| 10 | Alena Amialiusik (BLR) | Be Pink | + 7' 25" |

=== Points classification ===
| | Rider | Team | Points |
|---|---|---|---|
| 1 | Marianne Vos (NED) | Rabobank-Liv Giant | 74 |
| 2 | Claudia Häusler (GER) | Team TIBCO–To The Top | 35 |
| 3 | Evelyn Stevens (USA) | Specialized–lululemon | 35 |
| 4 | Tatiana Guderzo (ITA) | MCipollini–Giordana | 34 |
| 5 | Mara Abbott (USA) | USA National Team | 33 |
| 6 | Giorgia Bronzini (ITA) | Wiggle–Honda | 27 |
| 7 | Francesca Cauz (ITA) | Top Girls Fassa Bortolo | 25 |
| 8 | Kirsten Wild (NED) | Dutch National Team | 23 |
| 9 | Shara Gillow (AUS) | Orica–AIS | 21 |
| 10 | Ashleigh Moolman (RSA) | Lotto–Belisol Ladies | 15 |

=== Mountains classification ===
| | Rider | Team | Points |
|---|---|---|---|
| 1 | Mara Abbott (USA) | USA National Team | 30 |
| 2 | Tiffany Cromwell (AUS) | Orica–AIS | 23 |
| 3 | Valentina Scandolara (ITA) | MCipollini–Giordana | 22 |
| 4 | Marianne Vos (NED) | Rabobank-Liv Giant | 22 |
| 5 | Francesca Cauz (ITA) | Top Girls Fassa Bortolo | 20 |
| 6 | Tatiana Guderzo (ITA) | MCipollini–Giordana | 17 |
| 7 | Claudia Häusler (GER) | Team TIBCO–To The Top | 16 |
| 8 | Evelyn Stevens (USA) | Specialized–lululemon | 13 |
| 9 | Alena Amialiusik (BLR) | Be Pink | 10 |
| 10 | Shara Gillow (AUS) | Orica–AIS | 5 |

=== Young Riders classification ===
| | Rider | Team | Time |
|---|---|---|---|
| 1 | Francesca Cauz (ITA) | Top Girls Fassa Bortolo | 20h 34' 40" |
| 2 | Rossella Ratto (ITA) | Team Hitec Products | + 3' 34" |
| 3 | Georgia Williams (NZL) | Be Pink | + 6' 46" |
| 4 | Anna van der Breggen (NED) | Dutch National Team | + 8' 56" |
| 5 | Jessie Daams (BEL) | Boels–Dolmans | + 10' 09" |
| 6 | Pauline Ferrand-Prévot (FRA) | Rabobank-Liv Giant | + 17' 13" |
| 7 | Dalia Muccioli (ITA) | Be Pink | + 17' 35" |
| 8 | Sérika Gulumá Ortiz (COL) | Vaiano Fondriest | + 20' 38" |
| 9 | Íngrid Drexel (MEX) | Pasta Zara–Cogeas | + 24' 20" |
| 10 | Valentina Scandolara (ITA) | MCipollini–Giordana | + 27' 42" |

=== Italian Riders classification ===
| | Rider | Team | Time |
|---|---|---|---|
| 1 | Tatiana Guderzo | MCipollini–Giordana | 20h 31' 48" |
| 2 | Francesca Cauz | Top Girls Fassa Bortolo | + 2' 52" |
| 3 | Rossella Ratto | Team Hitec Products | + 6' 26" |
| 4 | Jennifer Fiori | Top Girls Fassa Bortolo | + 12' 43" |
| 5 | Dalia Muccioli | Be Pink | + 20' 27" |
| 6 | Valentina Carretta | MCipollini–Giordana | + 22' 53" |
| 7 | Elena Berlato | Top Girls Fassa Bortolo | + 27' 33" |
| 8 | Valentina Scandolara | MCipollini–Giordana | + 30' 34" |
| 9 | Susanna Zorzi | Faren–Kuota | + 42' 26" |
| 10 | Alessandra D'Ettorre | Vaiano Fondriest | + 50' 09" |

=== Team classification ===
Obsolete – data not currently available for Stages 3 onwards

| Pos. | Team | Time |
|---|---|---|
| 1 | Dutch National Team | 8h 41' 45" |
| 2 | Rabobank-Liv Giant | s.t. |
| 3 | MCipollini–Giordana | s.t. |
| 4 | Be Pink | s.t. |
| 5 | Boels–Dolmans | s.t. |
| 6 | Wiggle–Honda | s.t. |
| 7 | Lotto–Belisol Ladies | s.t. |
| 8 | Top Girls Fassa Bortolo | s.t." |
| 9 | Specialized–lululemon | s.t. |
| 10 | Pasta Zara–Cogeas | s.t." |
