= Kim de Baat =

Dutch-born Belgian cyclist

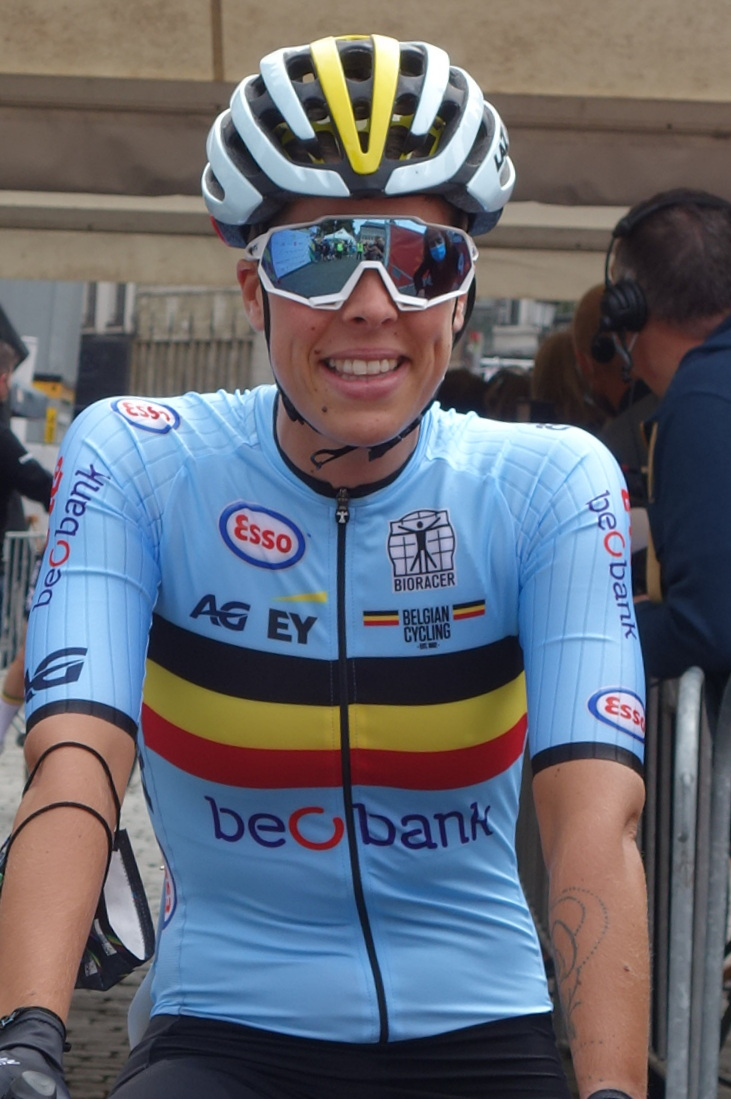
- De Baat at the 2021 UCI Road World Championships

Personal information
- Full name: Kim de Baat
- Born: 29 May 1991 (age 35) Rotterdam, Netherlands

Cycling career
- Sport: Cycling
- Discipline: Road
- Role: Rider

Amateur teams
- 2011: Dura–Vermeer Cycling Team
- 2012: Specialized DPD SRAM Cycling Team
- 2021: Dubai Police

Professional teams
- 2013: Boels–Dolmans
- 2014: Parkhotel Valkenburg Continental Team
- 2015–2017: Lensworld.eu–Zannata
- 2018–2019: Doltcini–Van Eyck Sport
- 2020: Ciclotel
- 2022–2023: Plantur–Pura

Kim de Baat (born 29 May 1991) is a Dutch-born Belgian former professional racing cyclist, who last rode for UCI Women's Continental Team Fenix–Deceuninck.

She is the daughter of the 1977 Dutch woman road champion Nita van Vliet and niece of former racing cyclist Teun van Vliet.

== Major results ==
2013
6th Erondegemse Pijl
8th Tour of Chongming Island World Cup
2014
5th 7-Dorpenomloop Aalburg
2015
6th EPZ Omloop van Borsele
6th Tour of Chongming Island World Cup
8th Ronde van Gelderland
2022
1st Road race, National Road Championships

== See also ==
- 2014 Parkhotel Valkenburg Continental Team season
