= 2013 GP de Plouay =

2013 UCI Women's Road World Cup, race 8 of 8

Race details
- Dates: 31 August 2013
- Stages: 1
- Distance: 135 km (84 mi)
- Winning time: 3h 26' 18"

Results
	Winner	Marianne Vos (NED)	(Rabobank-Liv Giant)
	Second	Emma Johansson (SWE)	(Orica–AIS)
	Third	Anna van der Breggen (NED)	(Sengers Ladies Cycling Team)

UCI Report

The 2013 GP de Plouay was the 13th edition of the GP de Plouay, a women's road race in Plouay, France. It was held on 31 August 2013 over a distance of 135 kilometres (83.9 miles) and was the eight and final race of the 2013 UCI Women's Road World Cup season.

The number 3 of the 2013 UCI Road World Cup standings, Ellen van Dijk, did not participate in this race. After the race, the top 3 of the UCI World Cup Standings remained the same. Marianne Vos won the World Cup, ahead of Emma Johansson and Ellen van Dijk.

== General standings (top 10) ==
	Cyclists	Team	Time	World Cup points
1	Marianne Vos (NED)	Rabobank-Liv Giant	3h 26' 18"	75
2	Emma Johansson (SWE)	Orica–AIS	+ 12"	50
3	Anna van der Breggen (NED)	Sengers Ladies Cycling Team	+ 17"	35
4	Alena Amialiusik (BLR)	BePink	+ 1' 27"	30
5	Karol-Ann Canuel (CAN)	Vienne Futuroscope	+ 1' 35"	27
6	Lucinda Brand (NED)	Rabobank-Liv Giant	+ 3' 56"	24
7	Noemi Cantele (ITA)	BePink	+ 3' 56"	21
8	Tatiana Antoshina (RUS)	MCipollini–Giordana	+ 3' 56"	18
9	Annemiek van Vleuten (NED)	Rabobank-Liv Giant	+ 3' 56"	15
10	Rossella Ratto (ITA)	Hitec Products UCK	+ 3' 56"	11

== Points standings ==
=== Individuals ===
World Cup individual standings after 8 of 8 races.

	Cyclist	Team	World Cup points
1	Marianne Vos (NED)	Rabobank-Liv Giant	429
2	Emma Johansson (SWE)	Orica–AIS	302
3	Ellen van Dijk (NED)	Specialized–lululemon	224
4	Anna van der Breggen (NED)	Sengers Ladies Cycling Team	158
5	Elisa Longo Borghini (ITA)	Hitec Products UCK	156
6	Annemiek van Vleuten (NED)	Rabobank-Liv Giant	101
7	Amy Pieters (NED)	Argos-Shimano	80
8	Tetyana Ryabchenko (UKR)	Chirio Forno d'Asolo	75
9	Giorgia Bronzini (ITA)	Wiggle–Honda	69
10	Evelyn Stevens (USA)	Specialized–lululemon	60

=== Teams ===
World Cup Team standings after 8 of 8 races.

Place	UCI Code	Team Name	World Cup Points
1	RBW	Rabobank-Liv Giant	695
2	GEW	Orica–AIS	500
3	SLU	Specialized–lululemon	394
4	HPU	Hitec Products UCK	291
5	SLT	Sengers Ladies Cycling Team	239
