= 2013 Open de Suède Vårgårda =

2013 UCI Women's Road World Cup, race 7 of 8

Race details
- Dates: 18 August 2013
- Stages: 1
- Distance: 132 km (82 mi)
- Winning time: 3h 26' 41"

Results
	Winner	Marianne Vos (NED)	(Rabobank-Liv Giant)
	Second	Emma Johansson (SWE)	(Orica–AIS)
	Third	Amy Pieters (NED)	(Argos-Shimano)

UCI Report

The 2013 Open de Suède Vårgårda will be the 8th road race running on the Open de Suède Vårgårda. It was held on 18 August 2013 over a distance of 132 kilometres (82.0 miles) and was the seventh race of the 2013 UCI Women's Road World Cup season.

== General standings (top 10) ==
	Cyclists	Team	Time	World Cup points
1	Marianne Vos (NED)	Rabobank-Liv Giant	3h 26' 41"	75
2	Emma Johansson (SWE)	Orica–AIS	s.t.	50
3	Amy Pieters (NED)	Argos-Shimano	s.t.	35
4	Ellen van Dijk (NED)	Specialized–lululemon	s.t.	30
5	Anna van der Breggen (NED)	Sengers Ladies Cycling Team	+ 25"	27
6	Evelyn Stevens (USA)	Specialized–lululemon	+ 48"	24
7	Roxane Knetemann (NED)	Rabobank-Liv Giant	+ 1' 22"	21
8	Rossella Ratto (ITA)	Hitec Products UCK	+ 1' 22"	18
9	Loes Gunnewijk (NED)	Orica–AIS	+ 1' 22"	15
10	Giorgia Bronzini (ITA)	Wiggle–Honda Pro Cycling	+ 2' 03"	11

== Points standings ==
=== Individuals ===
World Cup individual standings after 7 of 8 races.

	Cyclist	Team	World Cup points
1	Marianne Vos (NED)	Rabobank-Liv Giant	354
2	Emma Johansson (SWE)	Orica–AIS	252
3	Ellen van Dijk (NED)	Specialized–lululemon	224
4	Elisa Longo Borghini (ITA)	Hitec Products UCK	156
5	Anna van der Breggen (NED)	Sengers Ladies Cycling Team	123
6	Annemiek van Vleuten (NED)	Rabobank-Liv Giant	86
7	Amy Pieters (NED)	Argos-Shimano	80
8	Tetyana Ryabchenko (UKR)	Chirio Forno d'Asolo	75
9	Giorgia Bronzini (ITA)	Wiggle–Honda	69
10	Evelyn Stevens (USA)	Specialized–lululemon	59

=== Teams ===
World Cup Team standings after 7 of 8 races.

Place	UCI Code	Team Name	World Cup Points
1	RBW	Rabobank-Liv Giant	559
2	GEW	Orica–AIS	444
3	SLU	Specialized–lululemon	393
4	HPU	Hitec Products UCK	280
5	SLT	Sengers Ladies Cycling Team	197
