= 2015 Durango-Durango Emakumeen Saria =

Race details
- Dates: 9 June 2015
- Distance: 110 km (68 mi)
- Winning time: 3h 00' 18"

Results
	Winner	Emma Johansson (SWE)	(Orica–AIS)
	Second	Katarzyna Niewiadoma (POL)	(Rabobank-Liv Woman Cycling Team)
	Third	Elena Cecchini (ITA)	(Lotto–Soudal Ladies)

The 2015 Durango-Durango Emakumeen Saria was the fourteenth running of the Durango-Durango Emakumeen Saria, a women's bicycle race in Spain. It was held on 9 June over a distance of 110 kilometres (68.4 miles). It was rated by the Union Cycliste Internationale (UCI) as a 1.2 category race, and was won by Sweden's Emma Johansson.

== Results ==
Result
Rank	Rider	Team	Time
1	Emma Johansson (SWE)	Orica–AIS	3h 00' 18"
2	Katarzyna Niewiadoma (POL)	Rabobank-Liv Woman Cycling Team	+ 0"
3	Elena Cecchini (ITA)	Lotto–Soudal Ladies	+ 4"
4	Evelyn Stevens (USA)	Boels–Dolmans	+ 4"
5	Katrin Garfoot (AUS)	Orica–AIS	+ 39"
6	Jessie Daams (BEL)	Lotto–Soudal Ladies	+ 40"
7	Anna van der Breggen (NED)	Rabobank-Liv Woman Cycling Team	+ 40"
8	Ellen van Dijk (NED)	Boels–Dolmans	+ 40"
9	Chiara Pierobon (ITA)	Top Girls Fassa Bortolo	+ 40"
10	Tetyana Ryabchenko (UKR)	Inpa Sottoli Giusfredi	+ 49"
