= 2013 European Road Championships – Women's under-23 time trial =

Women's under-23 time trial
2013 European Road Championships
- UEC European Champion jersey

Race details
- Dates: 18 July 2013 in (Czech Republic) Olomouc (CZE)
- Stages: 1
- Distance: 22.4 km (13.92 mi)
- Winning time: 28' 38.45"

The Women's under-23 time trial at the 2013 European Road Championships took place on 18 July. The Championships were hosted by the Czech Republic city of Olomouc. The course was 22.4 km long. 34 cyclists competed in the time trial.

== Top 10 final classification ==
Rank	Rider	Time
1st place, gold medalist(s)	Hanna Solovey (UKR)	28' 38.45
2nd place, silver medalist(s)	Rossella Ratto (ITA)	+ 1' 35"
3rd place, bronze medalist(s)	Kseniya Dobrynina (RUS)	+ 1' 51"
4	Aude Biannic (FRA)	+ 2' 01"
5	Mieke Kröger (GER)	+ 2' 14"
6	Théa Thorsen (NOR)	+ 2' 20"
7	Jacqueline Hahn (AUT)	+ 2' 30"
8	Gylnaz Badykova (RUS)	+ 2' 52"
9	Thalita de Jong (NED)	+ 2' 54"
10	Anzhela Pryymak (UKR)	+ 3' 03"
