= Emma Trott =

English racing cyclist

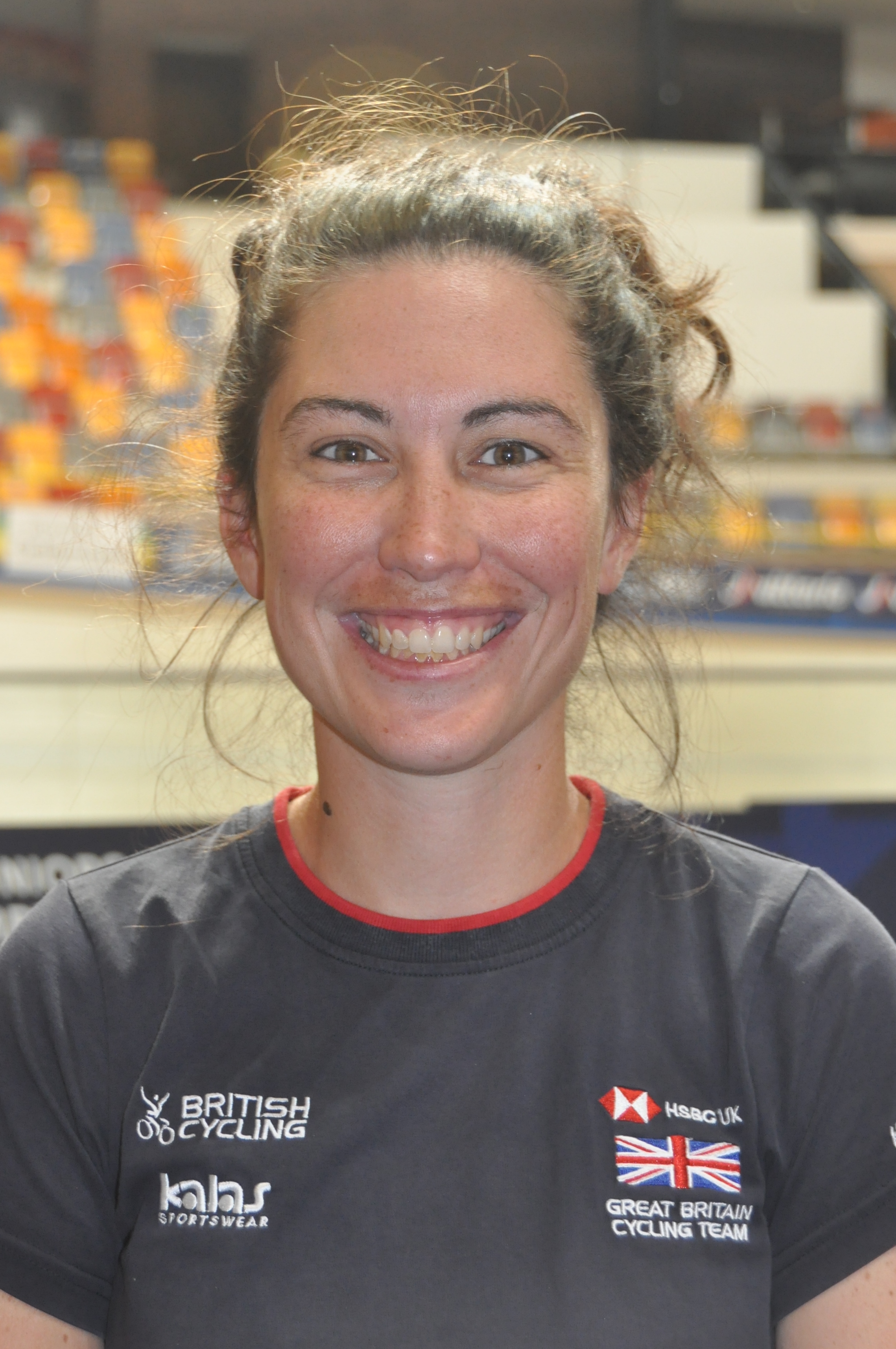
- Trott in 2021

Personal information
- Full name: Emma Trott
- Born: 24 December 1989 (age 36) Welwyn Garden City, England, United Kingdom
- Height: 1.65 m (5 ft 5 in)

Cycling career
- Sport: Cycling
- Discipline: Road
- Role: Rider

Amateur teams
- –2005: Welwyn Wheelers
- 2006–2007: VC Londres

Professional teams
- 2008: Team Halfords Bikehut
- 2009: Hako Weijers Movingladies (EUR-team)
- 2010: Moving Ladies
- 2011: Nederland Bloeit
- 2012–2014: Boels–Dolmans Cycling Team

Emma Trott (born 24 December 1989) is a retired English racing cyclist from Cheshunt, currently based in Christchurch, New Zealand. She rode for the Dutch women's professional team Dolmans-Boels from the 2012 to the 2014 season.

On 10 May 2014, Trott announced she would retire from road racing after the final stage of the Friends Life Women's Tour the following day. She became a personal trainer and cycling coach in New Zealand before returning to the UK to join the coaching team for British Cycling's women's academy programme from November 2018.

She is the older sister of fellow cyclist and Olympic Gold medalist Laura Kenny.

== Palmarès ==
2004
3rd British National Circuit Race Championships – under 16
2006
1st British National Road Race Championships – Junior
2007
3rd Individual Pursuit, British National Track Championships – Junior
3rd British National Road Race Championships – Junior

2008 – Team Halfords Bikehut 2008 season

3rd U23 British National Road Race Championships

2nd Individual Pursuit, British National Track Championships
3rd RTTC National 10 Mile Time Trial Championships

2009
6th Overall Tour de Feminin – O cenu Ceskeho Svycarska

1st Stage 2

2010
1st Stage 3 (ITT) Gracia–Orlová

2011
1st Scratch Race, European Track Championships – under 23

2013 – 2013 Boels–Dolmans season

2014 – 2014 Boels–Dolmans season
