= 2013 La Flèche Wallonne Féminine =

2013 UCI Women's Road World Cup, race 4 of 8
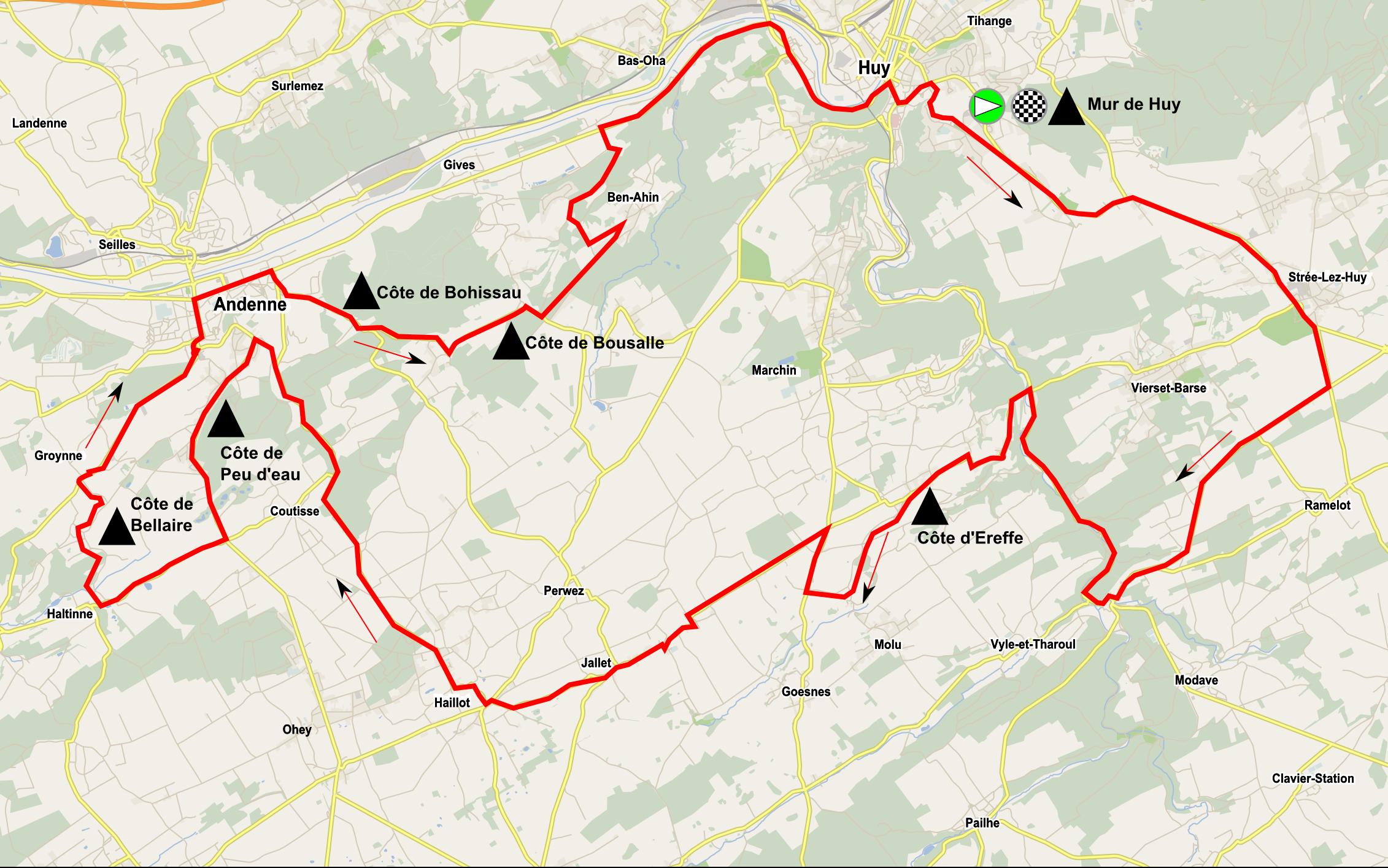

Race details
- Dates: 17 April 2013
- Stages: 1
- Distance: 131.5 km (81.7 mi)
- Winning time: 3h 34' 32"

Results
	Winner	Marianne Vos (NED)	(Rabobank-Liv Giant)
	Second	Elisa Longo Borghini (ITA)	(Hitec Products UCK)
	Third	Ashleigh Moolman (RSA)	(Lotto–Belisol Ladies)

UCI Report

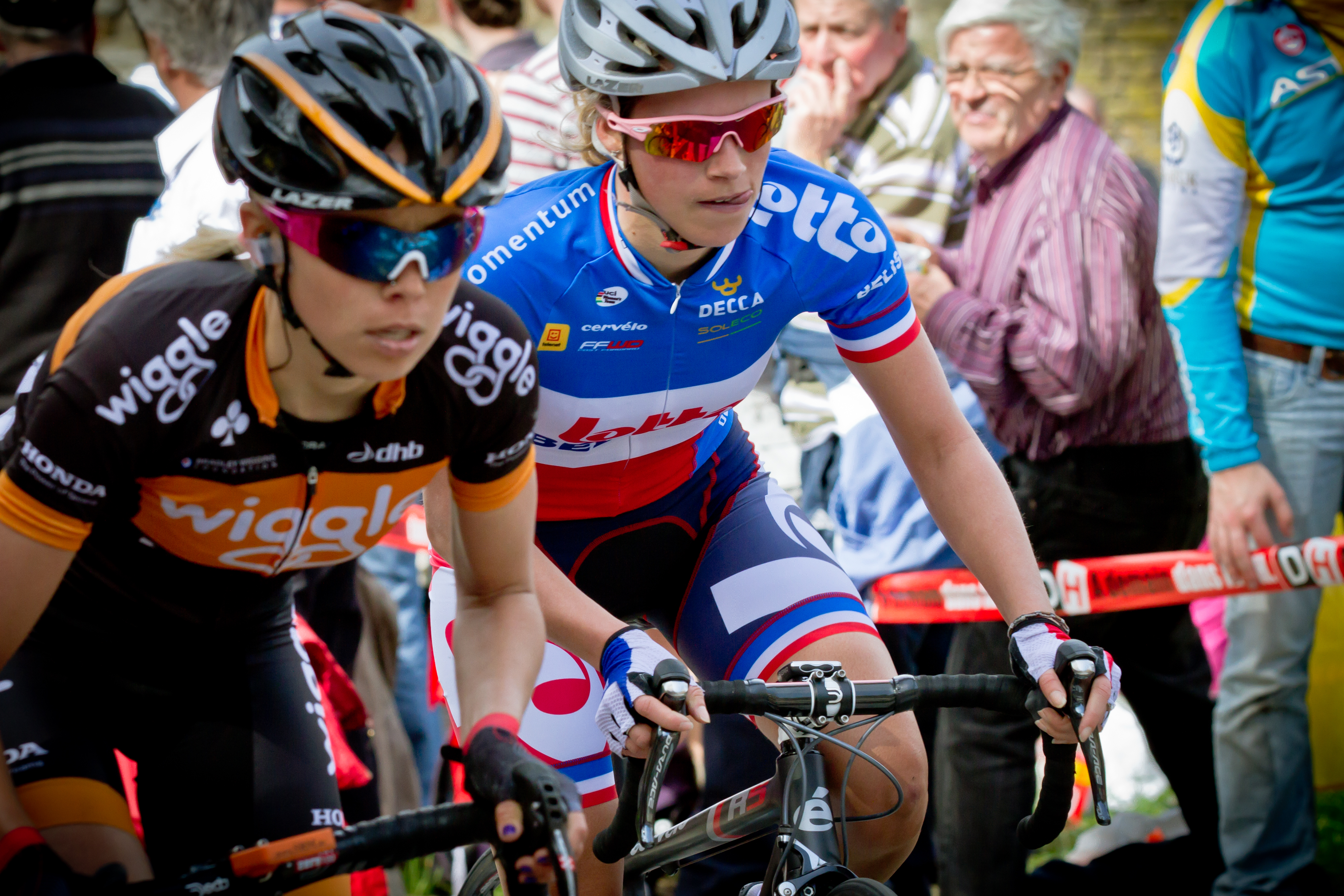
Emily Collins (left) and Marion Rousse climbing the Mur de Huy

The 2013 La Flèche Wallonne Féminine is the 16th running of the La Flèche Wallonne Féminine, a women's single-day cycling race held in Belgium and is the fourth race of the 2013 UCI Women's Road World Cup season. The race was held on 17 April 2013 over a distance of 131.5 kilometres (81.7 miles).

== Course ==
The 131.5 km event started in Huy, where the riders rode two laps of a tough circuit including the steep Mur de Huy (The wall of Huy) climb, with several sections steeper than 15% and up to 26% on one section. The finish was at the top of the Mur after the second ascent.

=== Mountain passes and hills ===
- At 18.5 km & 84.5 km: Côte d'Ereffe – 2.1 km climb of 5.9%
- At 37.0 km & 103.5 km: Côte de Peu d'Eau – 2.7 km climb of 3.9%
- At 42.5 km & 108.5 km: Côte de Bellaire – 1.0 km climb of 6.8%
- At 49.5 km & 116.0 km: Côte de Bohissau – 1.3 km climb of 7.6%
- At 53.0 km & 119.0 km: Côte de Bousalle – 1.7 km climb of 4.9%
- At 65.5 km & 131.5 km: Mur de Huy – 1.3 km climb of 9.3%

== Results ==
	Cyclist	Team	Time	World Cup points
1	Marianne Vos (NED)	Rabobank-Liv Giant	3h 34' 32"	75
2	Elisa Longo Borghini (ITA)	Hitec Products UCK	s.t.	50
3	Ashleigh Moolman (RSA)	Lotto–Belisol Ladies	s.t.	35
4	Anna van der Breggen (NED)	Rabobank-Liv Giant	+ 6"	30
5	Emma Johansson (SWE)	Orica–AIS	+ 6"	27
6	Ellen van Dijk (NED)	Specialized–lululemon	+ 19"	24
7	Alena Amialiusik (BLR)	BePink	+ 25"	21
8	Amber Neben (USA)	Pasta Zara–Cogeas	+ 28"	18
9	Tiffany Cromwell (AUS)	Orica–AIS	+ 33"	15
10	Jessie Daams (BEL)	Boels–Dolmans	+ 33"	11

== World Cup standings ==
Standings after 4 of 8 2013 UCI Women's Road World Cup races.

=== Individuals ===
	Cyclist	Team	World Cup points
1	Marianne Vos (NED)	Rabobank-Liv Giant	249
2	Ellen van Dijk (NED)	Specialized–lululemon	159
3	Elisa Longo Borghini (ITA)	Hitec Products UCK	155
4	Emma Johansson (SWE)	Orica–AIS	147
5	Anna van der Breggen (NED)	Sengers Ladies Cycling Team	76
6	Annemiek van Vleuten (NED)	Rabobank-Liv Giant	56
7	Lizzie Armitstead (GBR)	Dolmans-Boels Cycling Team	45
8	Tiffany Cromwell (AUS)	Orica–AIS	42
9	Kirsten Wild (NED)	Team Argos–Shimano	38
10	Ashleigh Moolman (RSA)	Lotto–Belisol Ladies	35

=== Teams ===
Place	UCI Code	Team Name	Points
1	RBW	Rabobank-Liv Giant	329
2	GEW	Orica–AIS	247
3	HPU	Hitec Products UCK	203
4	SLU	Specialized–lululemon	199
5	SLT	Sengers Ladies Cycling Team	90
