= Thalita de Jong =

Dutch cyclist

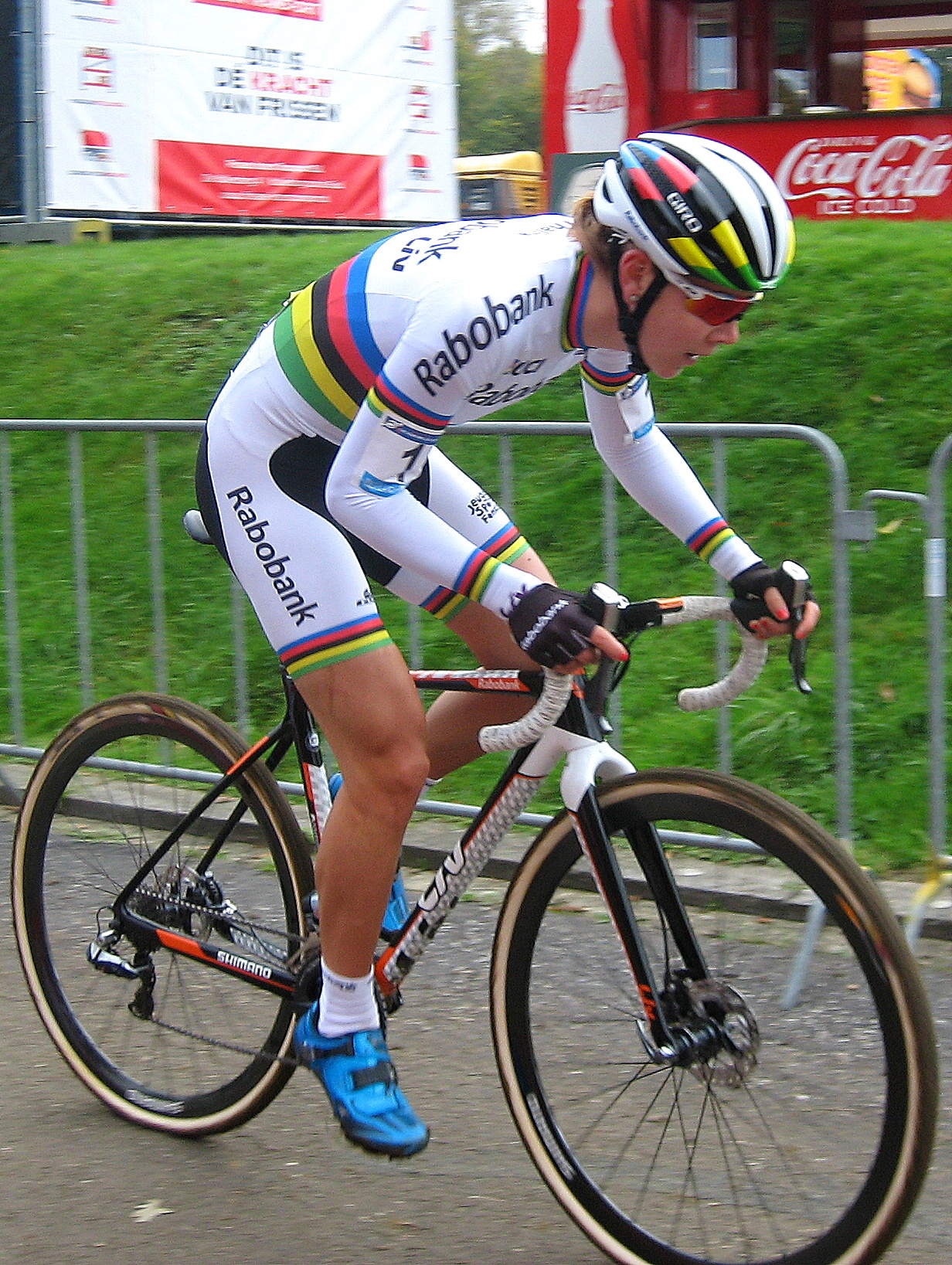
- De Jong, in her world champion skin-suit riding during a 2016 cyclo-cross race at Cauberg

Personal information
- Born: 6 November 1993 (age 32) Bergen op Zoom, Netherlands

Cycling career
- Sport: Cycling
- Current team: JEGG–DJR Academy
- Disciplines: Road; Cyclo-cross
- Role: Rider

Amateur teams
- 2019: Multum Accountants Ladies
- 2019: Chevalmeire Cycling Team
- 2022: JEGG–DJR Academy

Professional teams
- 2012–2016: Rabobank-Liv Woman Cycling Team
- 2017: Lares–Waowdeals
- 2018: Experza–Footlogix
- 2020–2022: Chevalmeire Cycling Team
- 2022–2023: Liv Racing TeqFind
- 2024: Lotto–Dstny Ladies
- 2025–: Human Powered Health

Major wins
- Cyclo-cross World Championships (2016) European Championships (2016) National Championships (2016) World Cup 1 individual win (2016–17)
Medal record
Representing Netherlands
Women's cyclo-cross
World Championships
Gold medal – first place	2016 Zolder	Elite
European Championships
Gold medal – first place	2016 Pontchâteau	Elite

Thalita de Jong (born 6 November 1993) is a Dutch racing cyclist, who currently rides for UCI Women's WorldTeam Human Powered Health. In 2016, de Jong won the elite women's title at the Dutch National Cyclo-cross Championships, the UEC European Cyclo-cross Championships and the UCI Cyclo-cross World Championships.

== Career ==
She competed in the 2013 UCI women's team time trial in Florence. She won gold at the 2016 UCI Cyclo-cross World Championships in Zolder, Belgium.

After five years with Rabobank-Liv Woman Cycling Team, in August 2016 Lares–Waowdeals announced that de Jong would join them for the 2017 season, leading the team on the road and in cyclo-cross. De Jong suffered a 2017 cyclocross season ending injury, falling at the Grand Prix Adrie van der Poel. Medical issues plagued her 2017 road season, by the end of the year, de Jong signed with the former Sport Vlaanderen–Guill D'or as it became Experza–Footlogix in 2018. During the 2019 season, she joined the Chevalmeire Cycling Team. She remained with the team until early in the 2022 season. Following several top-five finishes in the spring with JEGG–DJR Academy, de Jong joined Liv Racing Xstra from June, a team she had previously turned professional with.

== Personal life ==
She is the older sister of fellow professional cyclist, Demi de Jong.

== Major results ==
=== Cyclo-cross ===
2015–2016
1st UCI World Championships
1st National Championships
Bpost Bank Trophy

1st Sint-Niklaas
2nd Essen

1st Bredene
1st Ardooie
1st Pétange
1st Contern
UCI World Cup

2nd Hoogerheide

2016–2017
1st UEC European Championships
UCI World Cup

1st Cauberg

Superprestige

1st Spa-Francorchamps

Brico Cross

1st Bredene

1st Zonnebeke
1st Contern
2nd Overall DVV Trophy

1st Ronse
2nd Koppenberg
3rd Hamme
3rd Essen
3rd Loenhout
3rd Baal

2017–2018
1st Zonnebeke
1st Leudelange
2nd Leuven
2019–2020
2nd Contern

=== Road ===
2011
National Junior Championships

1st Time trial
3rd Road race

8th Overall Tour de Bretagne
2012
1st Time trial, Zuid-West-Nederland District Championships
3rd Open de Suède Vårgårda TTT
4th Time trial, UEC European Under-23 Championships
2013
2nd Team time trial, UCI World Championships
2nd Overall Tour de Bretagne

1st Young rider classification

2nd Open de Suède Vårgårda TTT
UEC European Under-23 Championships

6th Time trial
9th Road race

10th GP Leende
2014
2nd Open de Suède Vårgårda TTT
3rd Overall Belgium Tour

1st Sprints classification
1st Young rider classification
1st Stage 2 (TTT)

UEC European Under-23 Championships

4th Time trial
4th Road race

4th Dwars door de Westhoek
4th Ronde van Gelderland
4th Omloop van het Hageland
6th Overall Festival Luxembourgeois Elsy Jacobs
10th Overall Tour of Norway
2015
1st Erondegemse Pijl
1st Crescent World Cup Vårgårda TTT
2nd Grote Prijs De Wielkeszuigers
3rd Team time trial, UCI World Championships
UEC European Under-23 Championships

3rd Time trial
4th Road race

3rd GP Gippingen
4th Overall Holland Tour

1st Young rider classficiation
1st Stage 6

10th Holland Hills Classic
2016
1st Stage 9 Giro Rosa
2nd Overall Tour of Norway

1st Young rider classficiation

3rd Erondegemse Pijl
6th Overall Giro del Trentino

1st Points classification
1st Stages 2a (TTT) & 2b

2017
5th Dwars door Vlaanderen
2021
1st Grote Prijs Beerens
5th Overall Festival Elsy Jacobs

1st Mountains classification

7th Overall Tour International de l'Ardèche
2022
1st Ronde de Mouscron
3rd Volta Limburg Classic
4th Drentse Acht van Westerveld
5th Leiedal Koerse
2024
1st Overall Tour Cycliste Féminin International de l'Ardèche

1st Points classification
1st Mountains classification
1st Stages 1 & 2

2nd Overall Tour de la Semois

1st Mountains classification
1st Stage 2

2nd Dwars door het Hageland
2nd Altez GP Oetingen
3rd Durango-Durango Emakumeen Saria
3rd Overall Baloise Ladies Tour
5th Overall Bretagne Ladies Tour

1st Points classification
1st Mountains classification

5th Omloop Het Nieuwsblad
7th Overall Itzulia Women
8th Le Samyn
8th Tour de Normandie

1st Points classification

8th Gent–Wevelgem
9th Overall Setmana Ciclista Valenciana
10th Overall Tour de France
2025
1st Trofeo Binissalem-Andratx
4th Trofeo Palma Femina
10th Overall Setmana Ciclista Valenciana
2026
10th Dwars door Vlaanderen

== See also ==
- 2012 Rabobank Women Cycling Team season
- 2014 Rabo–Liv Women Cycling Team season
