= 2013 Tour of Chongming Island World Cup =

2013 UCI Women's Road World Cup, race 5 of 8

Race details
- Dates: 12 May 2013
- Stages: 1
- Distance: 126.8 km (78.8 mi)
- Winning time: 3h 04' 17"

Results
	Winner	Tetyana Ryabchenko (UKR)	(Chirio Forno d'Asolo)
	Second	Giorgia Bronzini (ITA)	(Wiggle–Honda)
	Third	Amy Pieters (NED)	(Argos-Shimano)

UCI Report

The 2013 Tour of Chongming Island World Cup is the fourth running of the Tour of Chongming Island World Cup, a women's single-day cycling race held in China and is the fifth race of the 2013 UCI Women's Road World Cup season. The race was held on 12 May 2013 over a distance of 126.8 kilometres (78.8 miles).

== Race ==
Marianne Vos and Ellen van Dijk, the two top leaders in the 2013 UCI Women's Road World Cup classification did not start in this World Cup race.

== Results ==
	Cyclist	Team	Time	World Cup points
1	Tetyana Ryabchenko (UKR)	Chirio Forno d'Asolo	3h 04' 17"	75
2	Giorgia Bronzini (ITA)	Wiggle–Honda	+ 12"	50
3	Amy Pieters (NED)	Argos-Shimano	+ 12"	35
4	Emma Johansson (SWE)	Orica–AIS	+ 12"	30
5	Sara Mustonen (SWE)	Faren–Let's Go Finland	+ 12"	27
6	Marta Tagliaferro (ITA)	MCipollini–Giordana	+ 12"	24
7	Marta Bastianelli (ITA)	Faren–Let's Go Finland	+ 12"	21
8	Kim de Baat (NED)	Boels–Dolmans Cycling Team	+ 12"	18
9	Tiffany Cromwell (AUS)	Orica–AIS	+ 12"	15
10	Yuliya Martisova (RUS)	Chirio Forno d'Asolo	+ 12"	11

== World Cup standings ==
Standings after 5 of 8 2013 UCI Women's Road World Cup races.

=== Individuals ===
	Cyclist	Team	World Cup points
1	Marianne Vos (NED)	Rabobank-Liv Giant	249
2	Emma Johansson (SWE)	Orica–AIS	177
3	Ellen van Dijk (NED)	Specialized–lululemon	159
4	Elisa Longo Borghini (ITA)	Hitec Products UCK	156
5	Anna van der Breggen (NED)	Sengers Ladies Cycling Team	76
6	Tetyana Ryabchenko (UKR)	Chirio Forno d'Asolo	75
7	Giorgia Bronzini (ITA)	Wiggle–Honda	58
8	Annemiek van Vleuten (NED)	Rabobank-Liv Giant	56
9	Lizzie Armitstead (GBR)	Boels–Dolmans Cycling Team	45
10	Tiffany Cromwell (AUS)	Orica–AIS	42

=== Teams ===
Place	UCI Code	Team Name	Points
1	RBW	Rabobank-Liv Giant	329
2	GEW	Orica–AIS	277
3	HPU	Hitec Products UCK	210
4	SLU	Specialized–lululemon	199
5	SLT	Boels–Dolmans Cycling Team	104
