= 2013 Tour of Flanders for Women =

2013 UCI Women's Road World Cup, race 3 of 8
- Official event poster

Race details
- Dates: 31 March 2013
- Stages: 1
- Distance: 127.4 km (79.2 mi)
- Winning time: 3h 33' 21"

Results
	Winner	Marianne Vos (NED)	(Rabobank-Liv Giant)
	Second	Ellen van Dijk (NED)	(Specialized–lululemon)
	Third	Emma Johansson (SWE)	(Orica–AIS)

UCI Report

The 2013 Tour of Flanders for Women was the tenth edition of the Tour of Flanders for Women single-day cycling race in Belgium and was the third race of the 2013 UCI Women's Road World Cup season. It was held on 31 March 2013 over a distance of 127.4 kilometres (79.2 miles).

== Results ==
	Cyclist	Team	Time	World Cup points
1	Marianne Vos (NED)	Rabobank-Liv Giant	3h 33' 21"	75
2	Ellen van Dijk (NED)	Specialized–lululemon	s.t.	50
3	Emma Johansson (SWE)	Orica–AIS	s.t.	35
4	Elisa Longo Borghini (ITA)	Hitec Products UCK	s.t.	30
5	Annemiek van Vleuten (NED)	Specialized–lululemon	+ 2' 37"	27
6	Adrie Visser (NED)	Dolmans-Boels Cycling Team	+ 2' 37"	24
7	Anna van der Breggen (NED)	Sengers Ladies Cycling Team	+ 2' 37"	21
8	Loes Gunnewijk (NED)	Orica–AIS	+ 2' 37"	18
9	Lizzie Armitstead (GBR)	Dolmans-Boels Cycling Team	+ 2' 37"	15
10	Kirsten Wild (NED)	Team Argos–Shimano	+ 2' 39"	11

== World Cup standings ==
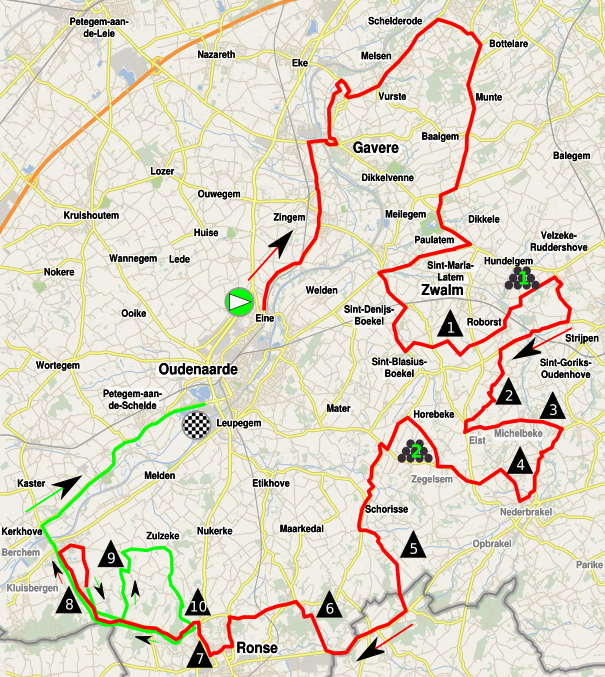
Map of the Tour of Flanders for Women 2013. Final in green.

Standings after 3 of 8 2013 UCI Women's Road World Cup races.

=== Individuals ===
	Cyclist	Team	World Cup points
1	Marianne Vos (NED)	Rabobank-Liv Giant	174
2	Ellen van Dijk (NED)	Specialized–lululemon	135
3	Emma Johansson (SWE)	Orica–AIS	120
4	Elisa Longo Borghini (ITA)	Hitec Products UCK	105
5	Annemiek van Vleuten (NED)	Rabobank-Liv Giant	56
6	Anna van der Breggen (NED)	Sengers Ladies Cycling Team	46
7	Kirsten Wild (NED)	Team Argos–Shimano	38
8	Elizabeth Armitstead (GBR)	Boels–Dolmans Cycling Team	36
9	Amanda Spratt (AUS)	Orica–AIS	30
10	Chloe Hosking (AUS)	Hitec Products UCK	30

=== Teams ===
Place	UCI Code	Team Name	Points
1	RBW	Rabobank-Liv Giant	246
2	GEW	Orica–AIS	205
3	SLU	Specialized–lululemon	175
4	HPU	Hitec Products UCK	153
5	DLT	Dolmans-Boels Cycling Team	66
