= Shara Marche =

Australian road cyclist (born 1987)

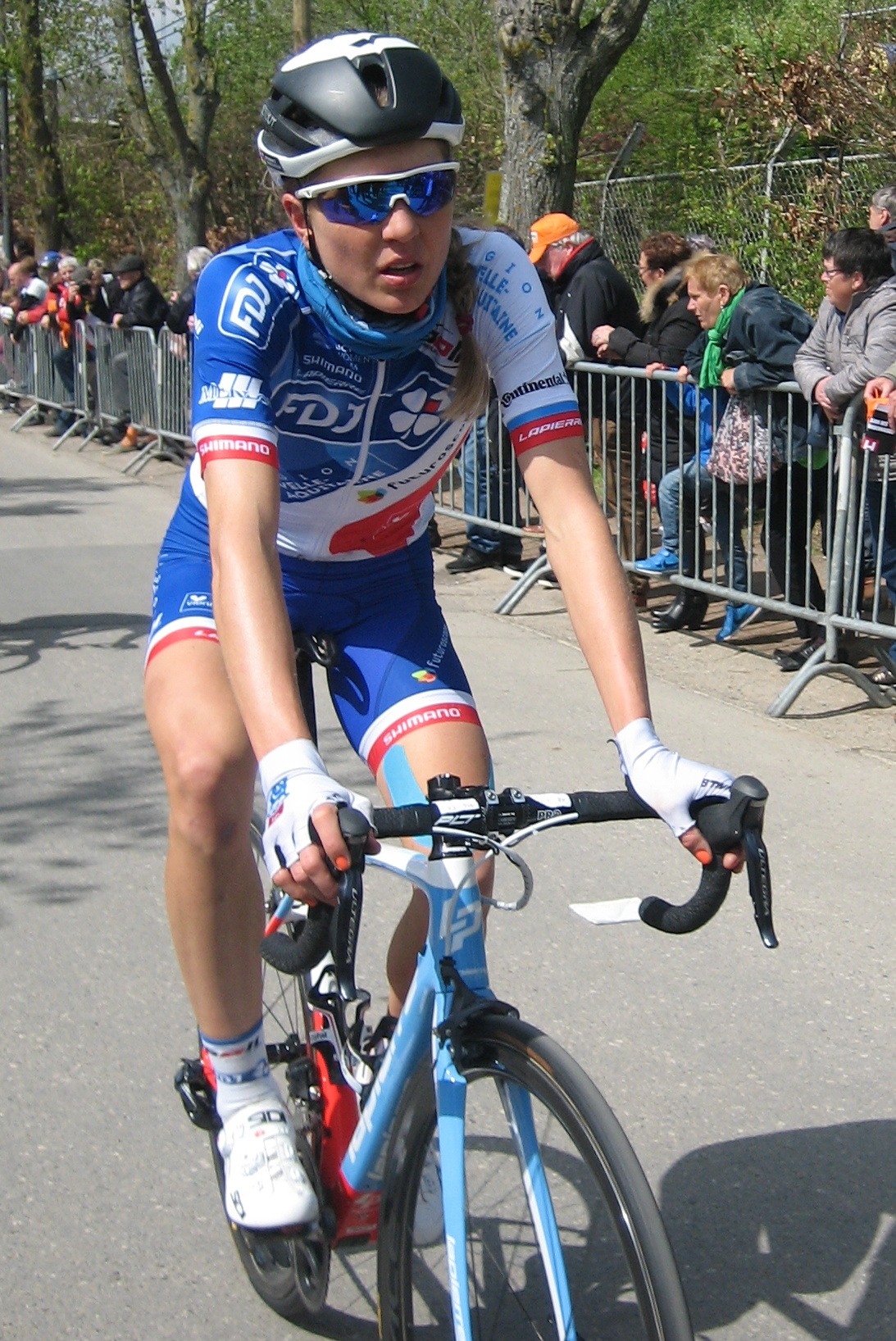
- Marche in 2017

Personal information
- Nickname: Shaza
- Born: Shara Gillow; 23 December 1987 (age 38) Nambour, Queensland, Australia
- Height: 175 cm (5 ft 9 in)
- Weight: 58 kg (128 lb)

Cycling career
- Sport: Cycling
- Current team: Retired
- Discipline: Road
- Role: Rider
- Rider type: Time trialist

Amateur team
- Sunshine Coast Cycling Club

Professional teams
- 2011: Bizkaia–Durango
- 2012–2014: Orica–AIS
- 2015–2016: Rabobank-Liv Woman Cycling Team
- 2017–2020: FDJ Nouvelle-Aquitaine Futuroscope
Medal record
Women's road cycling
UCI Road World Championships
Representing Orica–AIS (2012) / Orica–AIS (2013)
Silver medal – second place	2012 Valkenburg	Team time trial
Bronze medal – third place	2013 Tuscany	Team time trial
Representing Rabobank-Liv Woman Cycling Team
Bronze medal – third place	2015 Richmond	Team time trial

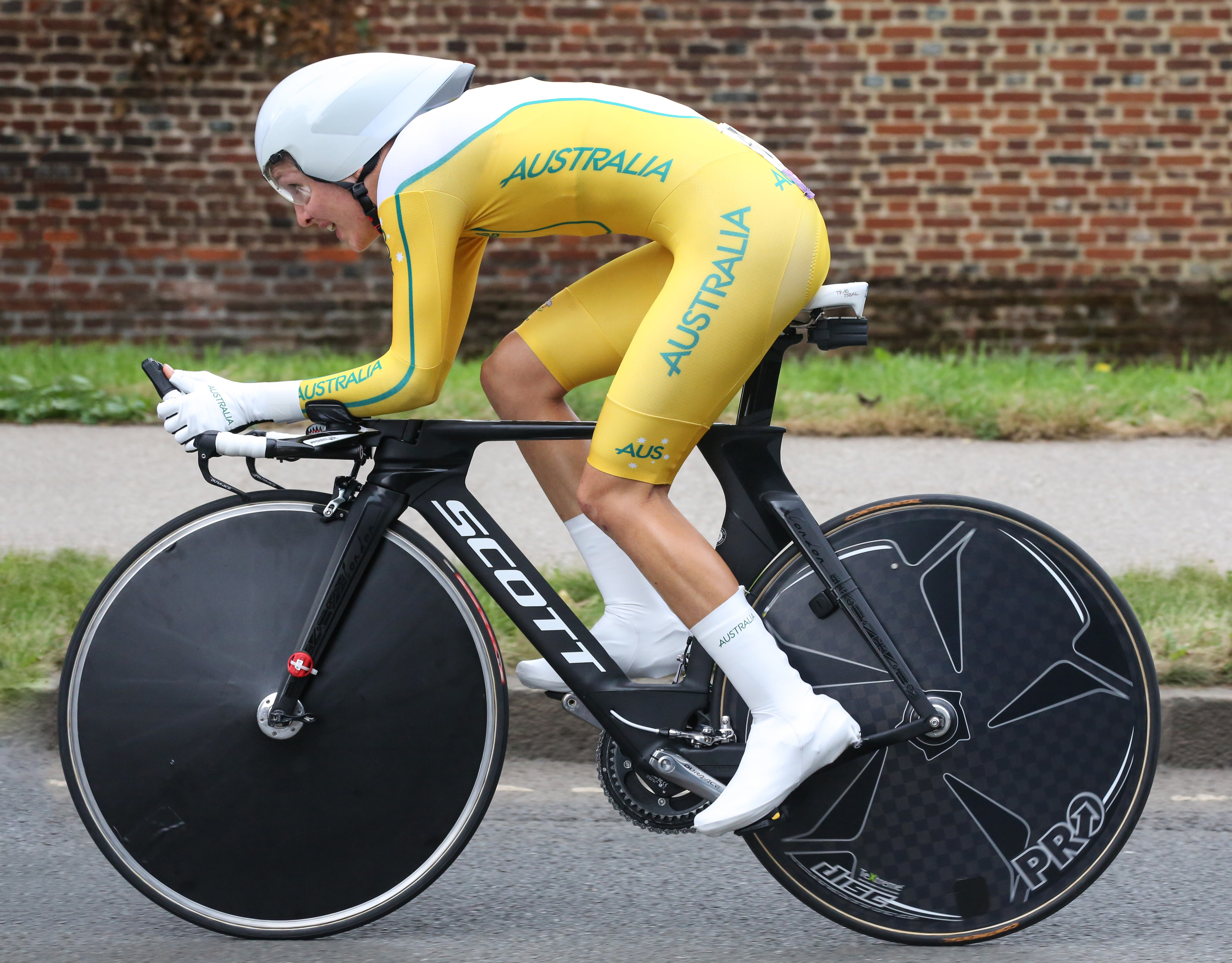
Gillow competing in the 2012 Olympics time trial in London

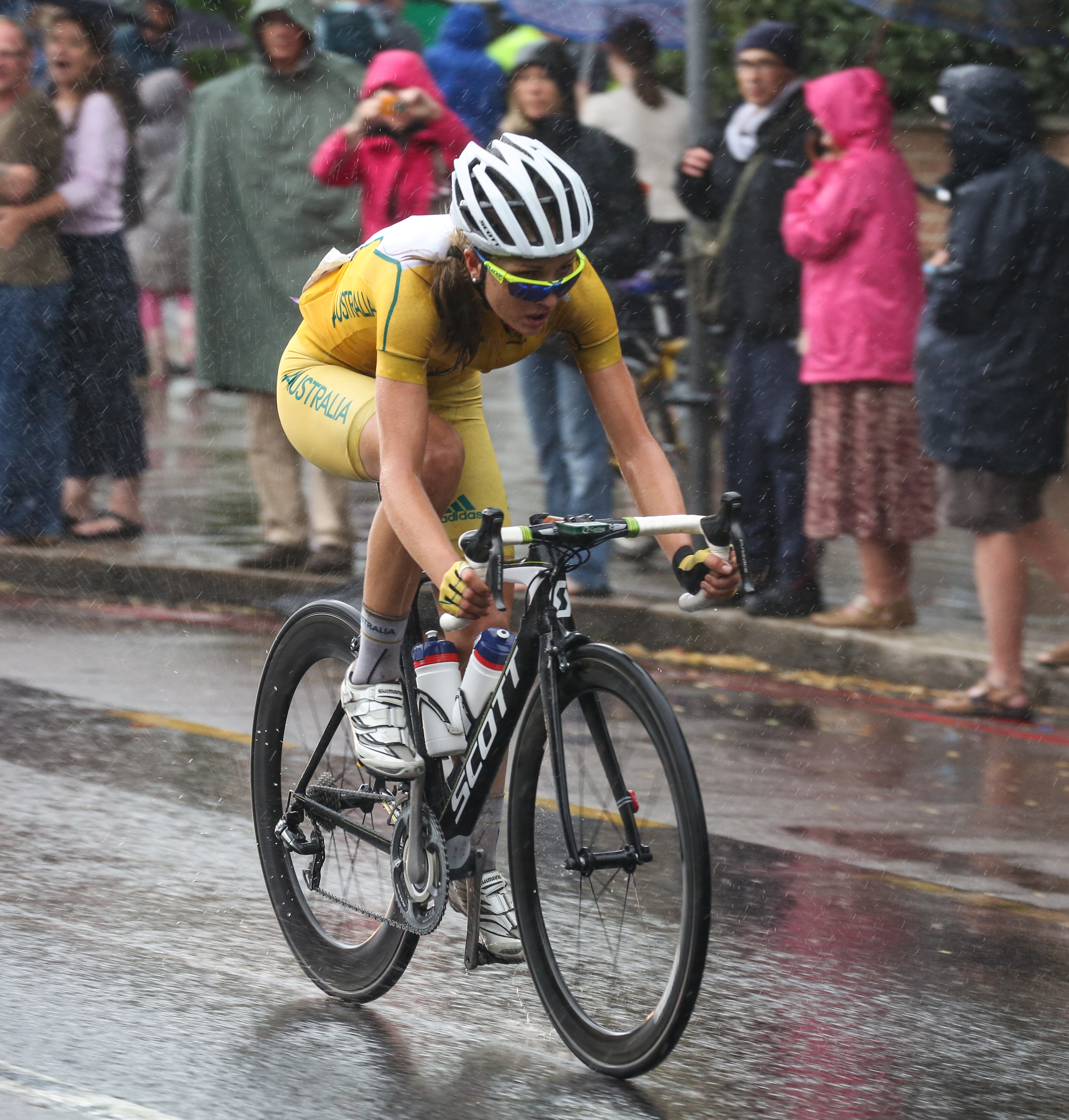
Gillow competing in the 2012 Olympics road race in London

Shara Marche (née Gillow; born 23 December 1987) is an Australian former professional cyclist, who competed professionally between 2011 and 2020, for the Bizkaia–Durango, Orica–AIS, Rabobank-Liv Woman Cycling Team and FDJ Nouvelle-Aquitaine Futuroscope teams. She was selected to represent Australia at the 2012 Summer Olympics, where she finished 13th in the time trial and 39th in the road race.

Following her retirement, Marche became a food coach and nutritionist at UCI Women's WorldTeam Team SD Worx–Protime.

== Personal ==
Marche was born on 23 December 1987 in Nambour, Queensland. Her father David Gillow is an Olympic cyclist who represented Zimbabwe at the 1980 Summer Olympics. She attended Nambour Christian College then was home schooled and obtained a Bachelor of Language from Western Sydney Institute. As of 2012, she lived in Belli Park, Queensland. Beyond cycling, Marche is also a surfer.

In 2019, she married Nicolas Marche, then a directeur sportif for UCI WorldTeam Team Sunweb. The couple live in Besançon, France, and have a son, born in 2022.

== Cycling ==
Marche did not become a professional cyclist until she was twenty years old, taking inspiration from her father to get involved with the sport.

Marche was coached by Martin Barras from 2010. Her coach said she "was one of the most physically gifted cyclists he had seen, but tended to be too conservative and protective when competing." Her primary training base is in Italy, with a secondary training base in Australia. She is a member of the Sunshine Coast Cycling Club. She has cycling scholarships with the Queensland Academy of Sport and Australian Institute of Sport. She was a member of the Orica–AIS professional cycling team.

Marche finished 4th at the 2011 Memorial Davide Fardelli in Rogno, Italy. She finished 3rd at the Thüringen Rundfahrt der Frauen in Germany. She finished 9th overall at the 2011 Giro d'Italia Femminile in Italy. She finished 8th at the 2012 La visite chrono du Gatineau in Canada. She finished 7th at the 2012 Prologue GP Elsy Jacobs in Luxembourg. She finished 1st in the individual time trial and 2nd in the road event at the 2012 Oceania Road Championships in Queenstown, New Zealand. She finished 2nd at the 2012 Women's Tour of New Zealand. She finished 1st in the individual time trial event at the 2012 Australian Road Championships in Learmonth, Australia.

Marche was selected to represent Australia at the 2012 Summer Olympics in the road race and individual time trial. Prior to the Olympics, she raced with Australia's Orica–AIS team in the Giro Donne. She finished 13th in the time trial and 39th in the road race.

In September 2016, it was announced that Marche would join FDJ Nouvelle-Aquitaine Futuroscope for the 2017 season. She spent the rest of her professional career with the team, announcing her retirement in September 2020.

== Major results ==
2008
2nd Overall Tour of Bright

2009
2nd Overall Canberra Tour
8th Overall Women's Tour of New Zealand
9th Chrono Champenois

2010
1st Stage 1 (ITT) Mersey Valley Tour
8th UCI Road World Championships – Women's time trial

2011
Oceania Road Championships

1st Road race
1st Time trial

1st Time trial, National Road Championships
3rd Overall Thüringen Rundfahrt der Frauen
4th Overall Women's Tour of New Zealand
4th Memorial Davide Fardelli
7th Chrono Champenois
9th Overall Giro d'Italia Femminile

1st Stage 2

2012
Oceania Road Championships

1st Time trial
2nd Road race

National Road Championships

1st Time trial
7th Road race

1st Stage 3 Bay Classic Series
2nd Team time trial
2nd Overall Women's Tour of New Zealand
2nd Open de Suède Vårgårda TTT
8th Chrono Gatineau
10th UCI Road World Championships – Women's time trial

2013
National Road Championships

1st Time trial
6th Road race

2nd Overall Thüringen Rundfahrt der Frauen

1st Stage 4 (ITT)

3rd Team time trial, UCI Road World Championships
3rd Open de Suède Vårgårda TTT
3rd Chrono Champenois – Trophée Européen
4th Overall Giro d'Italia Femminile
7th Overall Giro del Trentino Alto Adige-Südtirol

1st Stage 2

10th Overall Emakumeen Euskal Bira

2014
Oceania Road Championships

1st Time trial
3rd Road race

National Road Championships

2nd Time trial
9th Road race

3rd Overall BeNe Ladies Tour
4th Open de Suède Vårgårda TTT
6th Time trial, Commonwealth Games
10th Overall Emakumeen Euskal Bira

2015
National Road Championships

1st Time trial
3rd Road race

1st Crescent Women World Cup Vårgårda TTT
3rd Team time trial, UCI Road World Championships
10th Overall Giro d'Italia Femminile

2016
2nd Time trial, National Road Championships
2nd Overall Gracia–Orlová
Crescent Vårgårda UCI Women's WorldTour

3rd Team time trial
9th Road race

7th Draai van de Kaai
8th 7-Dorpenomloop Aalburg
8th Ridderronde Maastricht
10th Chrono Champenois

2017
1st Overall Tour de Charente-Maritime

1st Stages 1 & 2 (ITT)

National Road Championships

2nd Time trial
5th Road race

2nd Durango-Durango Emakumeen Saria
3rd Grand Prix de Plumelec-Morbihan
5th La Flèche Wallonne Féminine
5th La Course by Le Tour de France
6th Strade Bianche
7th Liège–Bastogne–Liège
8th Women's Tour de Yorkshire

2018
National Road Championships

3rd Time trial
7th Road race

6th La Flèche Wallonne
7th Durango-Durango Emakumeen Saria
7th Grand Prix de Plumelec-Morbihan
8th Overall Setmana Ciclista Valenciana
8th Overall Women's Tour de Yorkshire
9th Liège–Bastogne–Liège

2019
National Road Championships

4th Road race
5th Time trial

4th Durango-Durango Emakumeen Saria
9th Overall Tour de Bretagne Féminin
9th Grand Prix de Plumelec-Morbihan
