= Jessie Daams =

Belgian cyclist

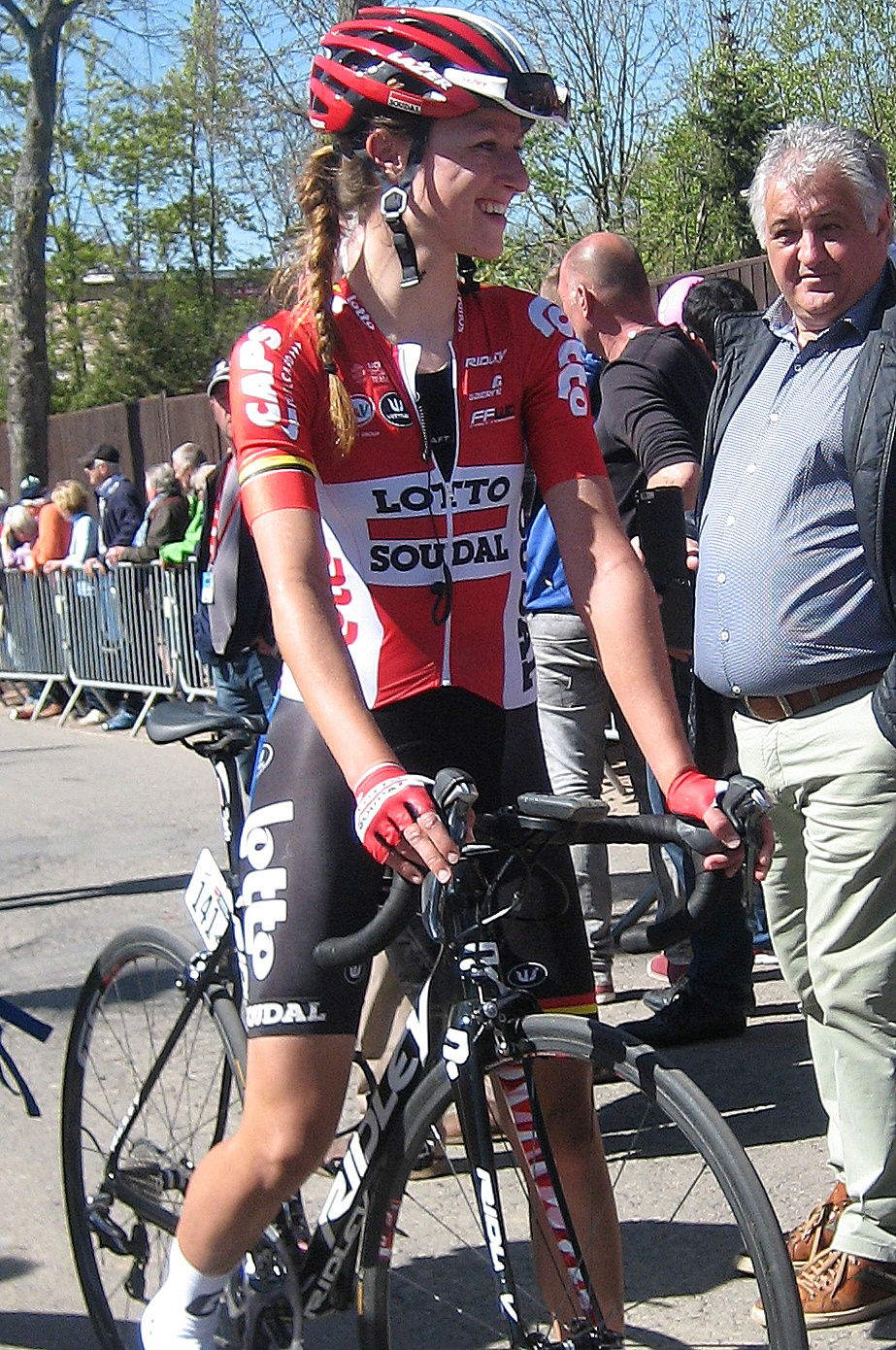
- Daams in 2016

Personal information
- Born: 28 May 1990 (age 36) Neerpelt, Belgium

Cycling career
- Sport: Cycling
- Current team: Retired
- Disciplines: Road; Track
- Role: Rider

Professional teams
- 2009–2010: Topsport Vlaanderen–Thompson Ladies Team
- 2011: Garmin–Cervélo
- 2012: AA Drink–leontien.nl
- 2013–2014: Boels–Dolmans
- 2015–2017: Lotto–Soudal Ladies

Jessie Daams (born 28 May 1990) is a Belgian former racing cyclist. She competed in the 2013 UCI women's road race in Florence. Her father is the Dutch cyclist Hans Daams.

== Major results ==
2008
3rd Road race, UEC European Junior Road Championships
7th Time trial, UCI Juniors World Championships
2009
2nd Team pursuit, UEC European Under-23 Track Championships (with Kelly Druyts and Jolien D'Hoore)
7th Holland Hills Classic
9th Overall Tour Féminin en Limousin
2010
1st Team pursuit, UEC European Under-23 Track Championships (with Kelly Druyts and Jolien D'Hoore)
2011
9th Road race, UEC European Under-23 Road Championships
2012
3rd Team time trial, UCI Road World Championships
3rd Road race, National Road Championships
6th Time trial, UEC European Under-23 Road Championships
9th Overall Holland Ladies Tour
10th Overall Thüringen Rundfahrt der Frauen

1st Stage 6

2013
6th Gooik–Geraardsbergen–Gooik
8th Holland Hills Classic
9th Overall Giro del Trentino Alto Adige-Südtirol
10th La Flèche Wallonne Féminine
2014
7th Omloop van het Hageland
8th Holland Hills Classic
9th Overall Emakumeen Euskal Bira
10th Trofee Maarten Wynants
2015
1st Time trial, Limburg Provincial Road Championships
6th Durango-Durango Emakumeen Saria
10th Overall La Route de France
2016
5th Durango-Durango Emakumeen Saria

== See also ==
- 2012 AA Drink-leontien.nl season
- 2013 Boels Dolmans Cycling Team season
- 2014 Boels Dolmans Cycling Team season
