= 2013 Trofeo Alfredo Binda-Comune di Cittiglio =

2013 UCI Women's Road World Cup, race 2 of 8

Race details
- Dates: 24 March 2013
- Stages: 1
- Distance: 120.5 km (74.9 mi)
- Winning time: 3h 12' 16"

Results
	Winner	Elisa Longo Borghini (Italy)	(Hitec Products UCK)
	Second	Emma Johansson (Sweden)	(Orica–AIS)
	Third	Ellen van Dijk (Netherlands)	(Specialized–lululemon)

UCI Report

The 2013 Trofeo Alfredo Binda-Comune di Cittiglio was the 38th running of the women's Trofeo Alfredo Binda-Comune di Cittiglio, a women's bicycle race in Italy and the second World Cup race of the 2013 UCI Women's Road World Cup. It was held on 24 March 2013 over a distance of 120.5 kilometres (74.9 miles).

The race was won by Italian rider Elisa Longo Borghini of Hitec Products UCK, the first Italian victory in the race for 13 years.

== Results ==
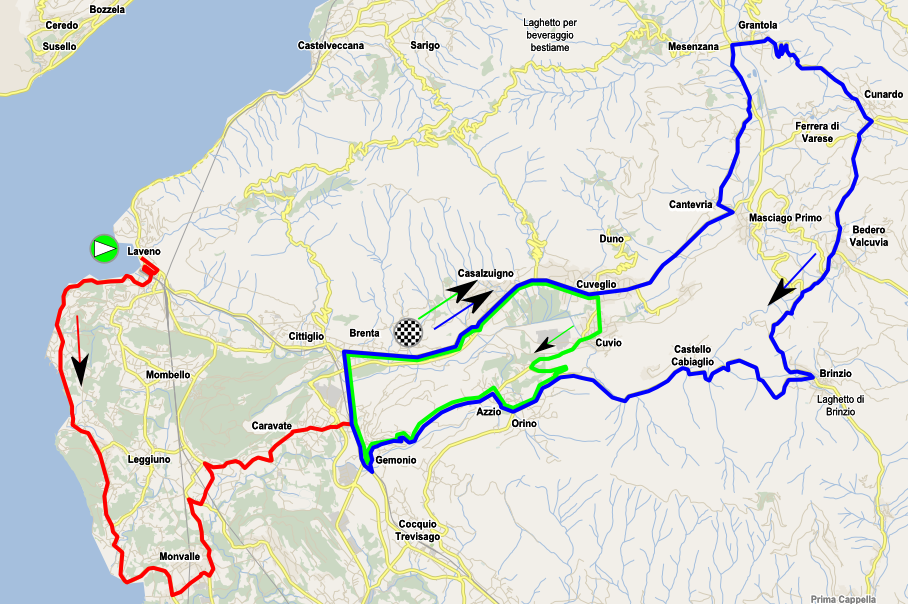
Map of the Trofeo Alfredo Binda-Comune di Cittiglio 2013. Start (red), long circuit made once (blue), short circuit made four times (green)

	Cyclist	Team	Time	World Cup points
1	Elisa Longo Borghini (ITA)	Hitec Products UCK	3h 12' 16"	75
2	Emma Johansson (SWE)	Orica–AIS	+ 1' 44"	50
3	Ellen van Dijk (NED)	Specialized–lululemon	+ 1' 44"	35
4	Amanda Spratt (AUS)	Orica–AIS	+ 1' 51"	30
5	Chantal Blaak (NED)	Team TIBCO–To The Top	+ 2' 21"	27
6	Marianne Vos (NED)	Rabobank-Liv Giant	+ 2' 21"	24
7	Annemiek van Vleuten (NED)	Specialized–lululemon	+ 2' 21"	21
8	Rossella Ratto (ITA)	Hitec Products UCK	+ 2' 21"	18
9	Anna van der Breggen (NED)	Sengers Ladies Cycling Team	+ 2' 21"	15
10	Carmen Small (USA)	Specialized–lululemon	+ 2' 21"	11

== World Cup standings ==
Standings after 2 of 8 2013 UCI Women's Road World Cup races.

	Cyclist	Team	World Cup points
1	Marianne Vos (NED)	Rabobank-Liv Giant	99
2	Ellen van Dijk (NED)	Specialized–lululemon	85
2	Emma Johansson (SWE)	Orica–AIS	85
4	Elisa Longo Borghini (ITA)	Hitec Products UCK	75
5	Chloe Hosking (AUS)	Hitec Products UCK	30
5	Amanda Spratt (AUS)	Orica–AIS	30
7	Annemiek van Vleuten (NED)	Specialized–lululemon	29
8	Kirsten Wild (NED)	Team Argos–Shimano	27
8	Chantal Blaak (NED)	Team TIBCO–To The Top	27
10	Anna van der Breggen (NED)	Rabobank-Liv Giant	25
10	Marijn de Vries (NED)	Lotto–Belisol Ladies	25
