= Tetyana Ryabchenko =

Ukrainian cyclist (born 1989)

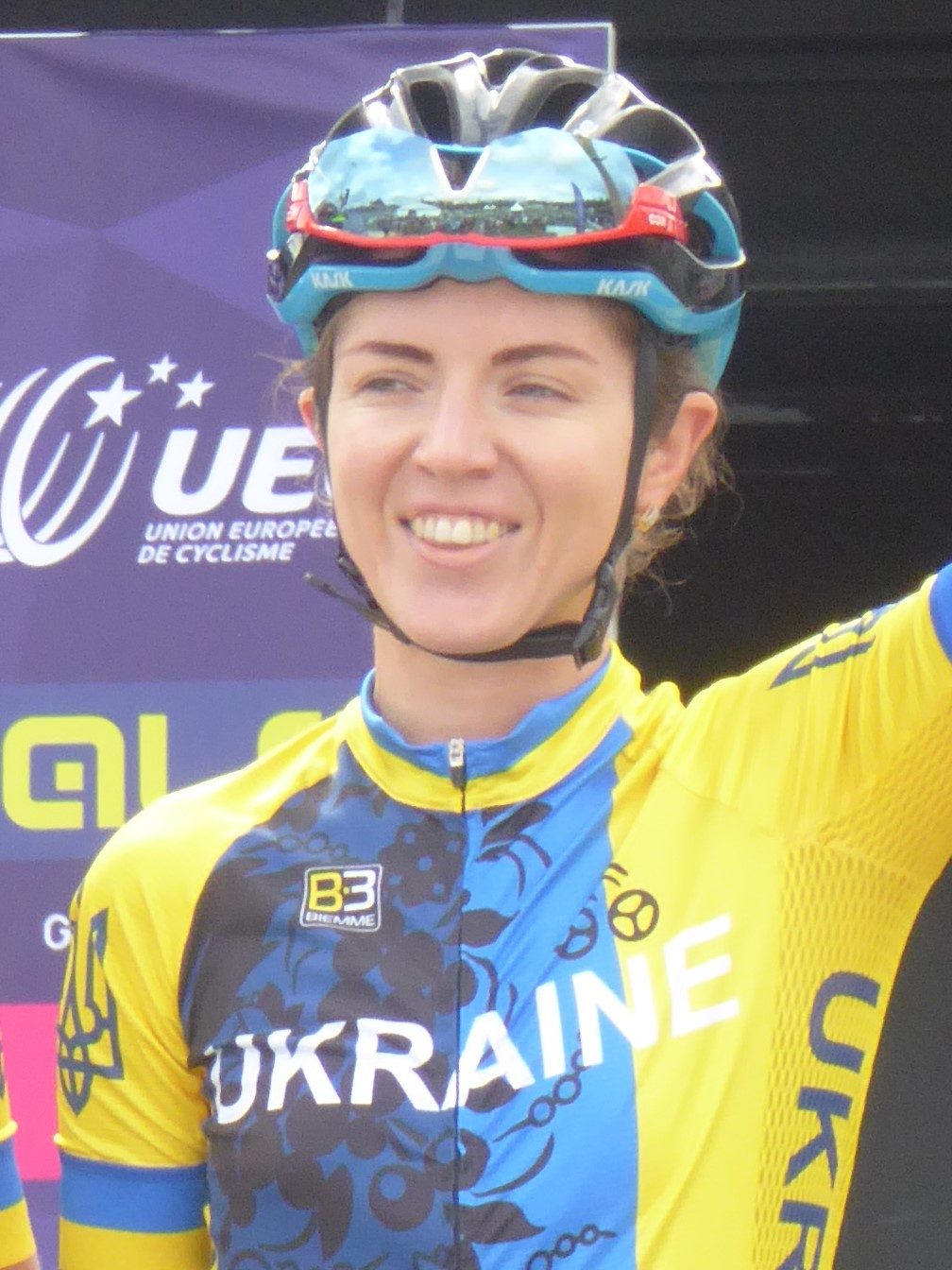
- Ryabchenko at the 2018 European Road Cycling Championships.

Personal information
- Full name: Tetyana Ryabchenko; Ukrainian: Тетяна Рябченко
- Born: 28 August 1989 (age 37) Ukraine

Cycling career
- Sport: Cycling
- Discipline: Road
- Role: Rider

Amateur team
- 2021: Mega Saray

Professional teams
- 2009–2013: USC Chirio Forno d'Asolo
- 2014: S.C. Michela Fanini Rox
- 2015–2016: Inpa Sottoli Giusfredi
- 2017: Lensworld–Kuota
- 2018–2019: Doltcini–Van Eyck Sport

Tetyana Ryabchenko (Ukrainian: Тетяна Рябченко; born 28 August 1989) is a Ukrainian racing cyclist, who most recently rode for Turkish amateur team Mega Saray.

== Major results ==
2011
1st Road race, National Road Championships
UEC European Under-23 Road Championships

7th Road race
10th Time trial

2013
1st Tour of Chongming Island World Cup
6th Overall Giro della Toscana Int. Femminile – Memorial Michela Fanini
7th Overall Tour of Zhoushan Island
2014
National Road Championships

1st Road race
1st Time trial

6th Grand Prix GSB
7th Overall Giro della Toscana Int. Femminile — Memorial Michela Fanini
7th Grand Prix el Salvador
8th Overall Vuelta a El Salvador
9th Overall Trophée d'Or Féminin
10th Grand Prix de Oriente
2015
National Road Championships

1st Road race
2nd Time trial

4th Overall Trophée d'Or Féminin

1st Mountains classification

5th Overall La Route de France
6th Overall Emakumeen Euskal Bira
6th Giro dell'Emilia Internazionale Donne Elite
10th Durango-Durango Emakumeen Saria
2016
1st Horizon Park Women Challenge
National Road Championships

2nd Road race
3rd Time trial

2nd VR Women ITT
7th Overall Tour Cycliste Féminin International de l'Ardèche
2017
National Road Championships

2nd Road race
3rd Time trial

5th VR Women ITT
2018
1st Mountains classification Panorama Guizhou International Women's Road Cycling Race
3rd Overall Giro della Toscana Int. Femminile – Memorial Michela Fanini
4th Overall Tour of Eftalia Hotels & Velo Alanya
5th Overall Tour of Zhoushan Island
7th VR Women ITT
9th Ljubljana–Domžale–Ljubljana TT
2019
2nd Time trial, National Road Championships
2nd VR Women ITT
4th Grand Prix Velo Alanya
6th Overall Vuelta a Burgos Feminas
7th Time trial, European Games
2020
4th Grand Prix Manavgat-Side
7th Grand Prix Velo Alanya
