= 2014 Orica–AIS season =

2014 Orica–AIS

Season victories
- One-day races: 5
- Stage race overall: 1
- Stage race stages: 3

The 2014 women's road cycling season was the third for the Orica–AIS team, which began as GreenEDGE-AIS in 2012.

== Roster ==
Ages as of 1 January 2014.

Rider	Date of birth
Annette Edmondson (AUS)	December 12, 1991 (aged 22)
Gracie Elvin (AUS)	October 31, 1988 (aged 25)
Katrin Garfoot (from 17/6)* (AUS)	October 8, 1981 (aged 32)
Shara Gillow (AUS)	December 23, 1987 (aged 26)
Loes Gunnewijk (NED)	November 27, 1980 (aged 33)
Melissa Hoskins (AUS)	February 24, 1991 (aged 22)

Rider	Date of birth
Emma Johansson (SWE)	September 23, 1983 (aged 30)
Jessie MacLean (AUS)	October 17, 1985 (aged 28)
Valentina Scandolara (ITA)	May 1, 1990 (aged 23)
Amanda Spratt (AUS)	September 17, 1987 (aged 26)
Grace Sulzberger (AUS)	December 18, 1988 (aged 25)
Carlee Taylor (AUS)	February 15, 1989 (aged 24)

*On June 17, the team announced the signing of Katrin Garfoot for the remainder of the 2014 season.

Riders who joined the team for the 2014 season

Rider	2013 team
Valentina Scandolara (ITA)	MCipollini–Giordana
Grace Sulzberger (AUS)	Jayco–AIS
Carlee Taylor (AUS)	Lotto Belisol Ladies

Riders who left the team during or after the 2013 season

Rider	2014 team
Tiffany Cromwell (AUS)	Specialized–lululemon
Sungeun Gu (KOR)	

== Season victories ==
Single day and stage races 2014
Date	Country	Race	Cat.	Winner
5 March	Belgium	Le Samyn des Dames	1.2	(Sweden) Emma Johansson
23 March	France	Cholet Pays de Loire Dames	1.2	(Sweden) Emma Johansson
30 March	Italy	Trofeo Alfredo Binda-Comune di Cittiglio	CDM	(Sweden) Emma Johansson
7 May	United Kingdom	Stage 1 The Women's Tour	2.1	(Sweden) Emma Johansson
30 May	Netherlands	Boels Rental Hills Classic	1.1	(Sweden) Emma Johansson
21 June	Italy	Giro del Trentino Alto Adige-Südtirol	1.1	(Italy) Valentina Scandolara
18 July	Germany	Stage 2 Combativity award Internationale Thüringen Rundfahrt der Frauen	2.1	(Australia) Gracie Elvin
20 July	Belgium; Netherlands	Stage 2a BeNe Ladies Tour	2.2	(Sweden) Emma Johansson
20 July	Belgium; Netherlands	General classification BeNe Ladies Tour	2.2	(Sweden) Emma Johansson

National, Continental and World champions 2014
Date	Discipline	Jersey	Winner
11 January	Australian National Road Race Champion		Gracie Elvin
21 February	Oceania Time Trial Champion		Shara Gillow
? February	Oceania Scratch Champion (track cycling)		Shara Gillow
26 June	Swedish National Time Trial Champion		Emma Johansson
28 June	Swedish National Road Race Champion		Emma Johansson

== Results in major races ==
=== Single day races ===
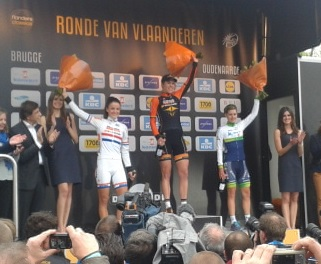
Johansson finished 3rd at the Tour of Flanders behind Ellen van Dijk (1st) and Lizzie Armitstead (2nd)

Results at the 2014 UCI Women's Road World Cup races
Date	#	Race	Best rider	Place
15 March	1	Ronde van Drenthe	(Sweden) Emma Johansson	8th
30 March	2	Trofeo Alfredo Binda-Comune di Cittiglio	(Sweden) Emma Johansson	1st
6 April	3	Tour of Flanders	(Sweden) Emma Johansson	3rd
23 April	4	La Flèche Wallonne Féminine	(Sweden) Emma Johansson	11th
18 May	5	Tour of Chongming Island	(Australia) Melissa Hoskins	5th
3 August	6	Sparkassen Giro	(Sweden) Emma Johansson	8th
22 August	7	Open de Suède Vårgårda TTT	Orica–AIS	4th
24 August	8	Open de Suède Vårgårda	(Sweden) Emma Johansson	10th
30 August	9	GP de Plouay	(Sweden) Emma Johansson	6th
Final individual classification			(Sweden) Emma Johansson	2nd
Final team classification				6th

Other major single day races
Date	Race	Best rider	Place
27 July	La Course by Le Tour de France	(Sweden) Emma Johansson	8th
21 September	UCI Road World Championships – Women's team time trial	Orica–AIS	2nd place, silver medalist(s)
23 September	UCI Road World Championships – Women's time trial (Note: Riders are part of the national team)		
27 September	UCI Road World Championships – Women's road race (Note: Riders are part of the national team)	(Sweden) Emma Johansson	3rd place, bronze medalist(s)

=== Grand Tours ===
Results of the team in the grand tours
Grand tour	Giro d'Italia Femminile
Rider (classification)	Claudia Häusler (6th)
Victories	0 stage win
