= 2014 Rabo–Liv Women Cycling Team season =

2014 Rabo–Liv Women Cycling Team
- Manager: Jeroen Blijlevens

Season victories
- One-day races: 7
- Stage race overall: 4
- Stage race stages: 22

The 2014 women's road cycling season was the tenth for the Rabo–Liv Women Cycling Team, which began as DSB Bank in 2005.

== Team roster ==
Ages as of 1 January 2014

| Rider | Date of birth |
|---|---|
| Lucinda Brand (NED) | October 22, 1989 (aged 24) |
| Thalita de Jong (NED) | June 11, 1993 (aged 20) |
| Pauline Ferrand-Prévot (FRA) | February 10, 1992 (aged 21) |
| Anna Knauer (GER) | February 20, 1990 (aged 23) |
| Roxane Knetemann (NED) | April 1, 1987 (aged 26) |
| Katarzyna Niewiadoma (POL) | September 29, 1994 (aged 19) |

| Rider | Date of birth |
|---|---|
| Iris Slappendel (NED) | February 18, 1985 (aged 28) |
| Sabrina Stultiens (NED) | July 8, 1993 (aged 20) |
| Anna van der Breggen (NED) | April 18, 1990 (aged 23) |
| Annemiek van Vleuten (NED) | October 8, 1982 (aged 31) |
| Marianne Vos (NED) | May 13, 1987 (aged 26) |

Riders who joined the team for the 2014 season

| Rider | 2013 team |
|---|---|
| Anna van der Breggen (NED) | Sengers Ladies Cycling Team |
| Anna Knauer (GER) | Former junior rider |
| Katarzyna Niewiadoma (POL) | Was a staigiare in September 2013 |

Riders who left the team during or after the 2013 season

| Rider | 2014 team |
|---|---|
| Megan Guarnier (USA) | Boels–Dolmans Cycling Team |
| Liesbet De Vocht (BEL) | Lotto–Belisol Ladies |
| Jolanda Neff (SUI) | |
| Sanne van Paassen (NED) | Boels–Dolmans Cycling Team |
| Rebecca Talen (NED) | |

== Season victories ==
| Date | Race | Cat. | Rider | Country | Location |
|---|---|---|---|---|---|
| 12 April | Energiewacht Tour, Stage 4 | 2.2 | Lucinda Brand (NED) | Netherlands | Eemsmond |
| 13 April | Energiewacht Tour, Overall | 2.2 | Lucinda Brand (NED) | Netherlands | |
| 13 April | fr:Dwars door de Westhoek | 1.1 | Anna van der Breggen (NED) | Belgium | Boezinge |
| 23 April | La Flèche Wallonne Féminine | UCI World Cup | Pauline Ferrand-Prevot (FRA) | Belgium | Huy |
| 2 May | Grand Prix Elsy Jacobs, Prologue | 2.1 | Marianne Vos (NED) | Luxembourg | Luxembourg |
| 3 May | Grand Prix Elsy Jacobs, Stage 1 | 2.1 | Anna van der Breggen (NED) | Luxembourg | Garnich |
| 4 May | Grand Prix Elsy Jacobs, Stage 2 | 2.1 | Marianne Vos (NED) | Luxembourg | Mamer |
| 4 May | Grand Prix Elsy Jacobs, Overall | 2.1 | Anna van der Breggen (NED) | Luxembourg | Garnich |
| 4 May | Grand Prix Elsy Jacobs, Points classification | 2.1 | Marianne Vos (NED) | Luxembourg | |
| 4 May | Grand Prix Elsy Jacobs, Mountains classification | 2.1 | Pauline Ferrand-Prévot (FRA) | Luxembourg | |
| 4 May | Grand Prix Elsy Jacobs, Young rider classification | 2.1 | Pauline Ferrand-Prévot (FRA) | Luxembourg | |
| 9 May | The Women's Tour, Stage 3 | 2.1 | Marianne Vos (NED) | United Kingdom | Clacton-on-Sea |
| 10 May | The Women's Tour, Stage 4 | 2.1 | Marianne Vos (NED) | United Kingdom | Welwyn Garden City |
| 11 May | The Women's Tour, Stage 5 | 2.1 | Marianne Vos (NED) | United Kingdom | Bury St Edmunds |
| 11 May | The Women's Tour, Overall | 2.1 | Marianne Vos (NED) | United Kingdom | |
| 11 May | The Women's Tour, Points classification | 2.1 | Marianne Vos (NED) | United Kingdom | |
| 31 May | 7-Dorpenomloop Aalburg | 1.2 | Marianne Vos (NED) | Netherlands | Aalburg |
| 1 June | Gooik–Geraardsbergen–Gooik | 1.1 | Marianne Vos (NED) | Belgium | Gooik |
| 10 June | Durango-Durango Emakumeen Saria | 1.2 | Marianne Vos (NED) | Spain | Durango |
| 12 June | Emakumeen Euskal Bira, Stage 1 | 2.1 | Pauline Ferrand-Prévot (FRA) | Spain | Iurreta |
| 13 June | Emakumeen Euskal Bira, Stage 2 | 2.1 | Marianne Vos (NED) | Spain | Oсati |
| 14 June | Emakumeen Euskal Bira, Stage 3 | 2.1 | Pauline Ferrand-Prévot (FRA) | Spain | Mungia |
| 15 June | Emakumeen Euskal Bira, Stage 4 | 2.1 | Marianne Vos (NED) | Spain | Ataun |
| 15 June | Emakumeen Euskal Bira, Overall | 2.1 | Pauline Ferrand-Prévot (FRA) | Spain | |
| 15 June | Emakumeen Euskal Bira, Points classification | 2.1 | Marianne Vos (NED) | Spain | |
| 15 June | Emakumeen Euskal Bira, Mountains classification | 2.1 | Anna van der Breggen (NED) | Spain | |
| 15 June | Emakumeen Euskal Bira, Teams classification | 2.1 | (Note: The riders on the squad were Pauline Ferrand-Prévot, Marianne Vos, Anna van der Breggen, Annemiek van Vleuten, Lucinda Brand and Thalita de Jong) | Spain | |
| 15 June | GP du Canton d'Argovie | 1.2 | Katarzyna Niewiadoma (POL) | Switzerland | Gippingen |
| 4 July | Giro d'Italia Femminile, Prologue | 2.1 | Annemiek van Vleuten (NED) | Italy | Caserta |
| 5 July | Giro d'Italia Femminile, Stage 1 | 2.1 | Marianne Vos (NED) | Italy | Santa Maria a Vico |
| 7 July | Giro d'Italia Femminile, Stage 3 | 2.1 | Annemiek van Vleuten (NED) | Italy | San Donato Val di Comino |
| 8 July | Giro d'Italia Femminile, Stage 4 | 2.1 | Marianne Vos (NED) | Italy | Jesi |
| 9 July | Giro d'Italia Femminile, Stage 5 | 2.1 | Marianne Vos (NED) | Italy | Cesenatico |
| 11 July | Giro d'Italia Femminile, Stage 7 | 2.1 | Marianne Vos (NED) | Italy | Chiavenna |
| 13 July | Giro d'Italia Femminile, Overall | 2.1 | Marianne Vos (NED) | Italy | |
| 13 July | Giro d'Italia Femminile, Points classification | 2.1 | Marianne Vos (NED) | Italy | |
| 27 July | La Course by Le Tour de France | 1.1 | Marianne Vos (NED) | France | Paris |
| 3 August | Sparkassen Giro | UCI World Cup | Marianne Vos (NED) | Germany | Bochum |
| 15 August | Ladies Tour of Norway, Prologue | 2.1 | Marianne Vos (NED) | Norway | Halden |
| 16 August | Ladies Tour of Norway, Stage 1 | 2.1 | Anna van der Breggen (NED) | Norway | Halden |
| 16 August | La Route de France, Stage 7 | 2.1 | Iris Slappendel (NED) | France | Marcigny |
| 16 August | La Route de France, Young rider classification | 2.1 | Sabrina Stultiens (NED) | France | |
| 17 August | Ladies Tour of Norway, Stage 2 | 2.1 | Marianne Vos (NED) | Norway | Fredriksten Fortress |
| 17 August | Ladies Tour of Norway, Overall | 2.1 | Anna van der Breggen (NED) | Norway | |
| 17 August | Ladies Tour of Norway, Points classification | 2.1 | Anna van der Breggen (NED) | Norway | |
| 17 August | Ladies Tour of Norway, Mountains classification | 2.1 | Katarzyna Niewiadoma (POL) | Norway | |
| 17 August | Ladies Tour of Norway, Young rider Classification | 2.1 | Katarzyna Niewiadoma (POL) | Norway | |
| 17 August | Ladies Tour of Norway, Teams classification | 2.1 | (Note: The riders on the squad were Anna van der Breggen, Marianne Vos, Katarzyna Niewiadoma, Roxane Knetemann, Annemiek van Vleuten and Thalita de Jong) | Norway | |
| 30 August | GP de Plouay | UCI World Cup | Lucinda Brand (NED) | France | Plouay |
| 4 September | Holland Ladies Tour, Stage 3 | 2.1 | Marianne Vos (NED) | Netherlands | Leende |

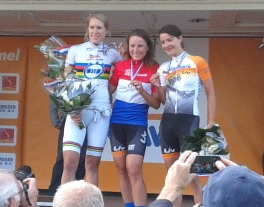
Van Vleuten won the Dutch Time Trial Championships, only 0.02 sec ahead of Ellen van Dijk (Boels–Dolmans).

National, Continental and World champions 2014
| Date | Discipline | Jersey | Winner |
|---|---|---|---|
| 25 June | Dutch National Time Trial Champion | | Annemiek van Vleuten |
| 25 June | French National Time Trial Champion | | Pauline Ferrand-Prévot |
| 28 June | French National Road Race Champion | | Pauline Ferrand-Prévot |
| 28 June | Dutch National Road Race Champion | | Iris Slappendel |
| 28 June | European Road Race Champion (under-23) | | Sabrina Stultiens |
