= 2014 Boels–Dolmans season =

2014 Boels–Dolmans Cycling Team
- Manager: Erwin Janssen

Season victories
- One-day races: 5
- Stage race overall: 0
- Stage race stages: 3
- Best ranked rider: Lizzie Armitstead (3rd)
- Jersey

The 2014 women's road cycling season was the fifth for the Boels–Dolmans Cycling Team, which began as the Dolmans Landscaping Team in 2010. The main new rider for the team was the Time Trial World Champion Ellen van Dijk, after have ridden 5 years for Specialized–lululemon. After winning the Omloop van het Hageland in early March, Lizzie Armitstead won also the first World Cup race, the Ronde van Drenthe. She would finish later three times in second place in the later World Cup races and keeping the lead in the overall World Cup classification. In begin April, after a solo of 30 km Ellen van Dijk won the Tour of Flanders World Cup race.

== Roster ==
The main new rider for the team was Ellen van Dijk. The Dutch world time trial champion who finished third in the UCI world Ranking and third in the overall World Cup signed a three years contract for Boels–Dolmans after have ridden 5 years for Specialized–lululemon.

Riders who joined the team for the 2014 season

Rider	2013 team
Ellen van Dijk (NED)	Specialized–lululemon
Janneke Ensing (NED)	Ronald McDonald Huis-Groningen
Megan Guarnier (USA)	Rabobank-Liv Giant
Demi de Jong (NED)	Former junior rider
Christine Majerus (LUX)	Sengers Ladies Cycling Team
Katarzyna Pawłowska (POL)	GSD Gestion-Kallisto
Nicky Zijlaard (NED)	Former junior rider

Riders who left the team during or after the 2013 season

Rider	2014 team
Kim de Baat (NED)	Parkhotel Valkenburg p/b Math Salden
Martine Bras (NED)	Retiring
Lucy Martin (GBR)	Faren Kuota
Adrie Visser (NED)	Retiring

== Season ==
=== February: Qatar ===
The team started the season with the Ladies Tour of Qatar in February. Lizzie Armitstead finished in fifth place in stage 1 and finished second in stage 3.

=== March – April: Classic races ===
In the first classic race of the season, the Omloop het Nieuwsblad, Armitstead was part of the front group of three riders, who made it to the finish together. She lost the sprint and finished third. A few days later, Ellen van Dijk finished fourth in the 2014 Le Samyn des Dames. The first victory for the team was at the Omloop van het Hageland. Armitstead had broken clear with Emma Johansson (Orica–AIS) and edged her out in a two-way sprint. It was her first victory since winning the British national title in June 2013 and her first win at an international race since a previous triumph at Omloop van het Hageland in March 2012. On 13 March Armitstead finished third at the Drentse 8 van Dwingeloo. Two days later was the first world cup race of the season, the Ronde van Drenthe. With 16 km to go, after riding the VAM mountain for the last time, Van der Breggen (Rabobank/liv) got an advantage of over 1' 30" on the chasing group. Ellen van Dijk closed about the whole gap and launched Armitstead who rode to Van der Breggen. Armitstead outsprinted Van der Breggen in the final and won the race. Armitstead said after the race that it was her best achievement after winning silver at the 2012 Summer Olympics and thanked Van Dijk for chasing down Van der Breggen. At the end of the month, on 30 March, was the second World Cup race, the Italian Trofedo Alfredo Binda. Both Ellen van Dijk and Lizzie Armitstead where part of the front group. Van Dijk was the lead out for Armistead in the sprint who finished second behind Johansson. Van Dijk finished eighth. On the same day was Gent–Wevelgem where Janneke Ensing finished second.

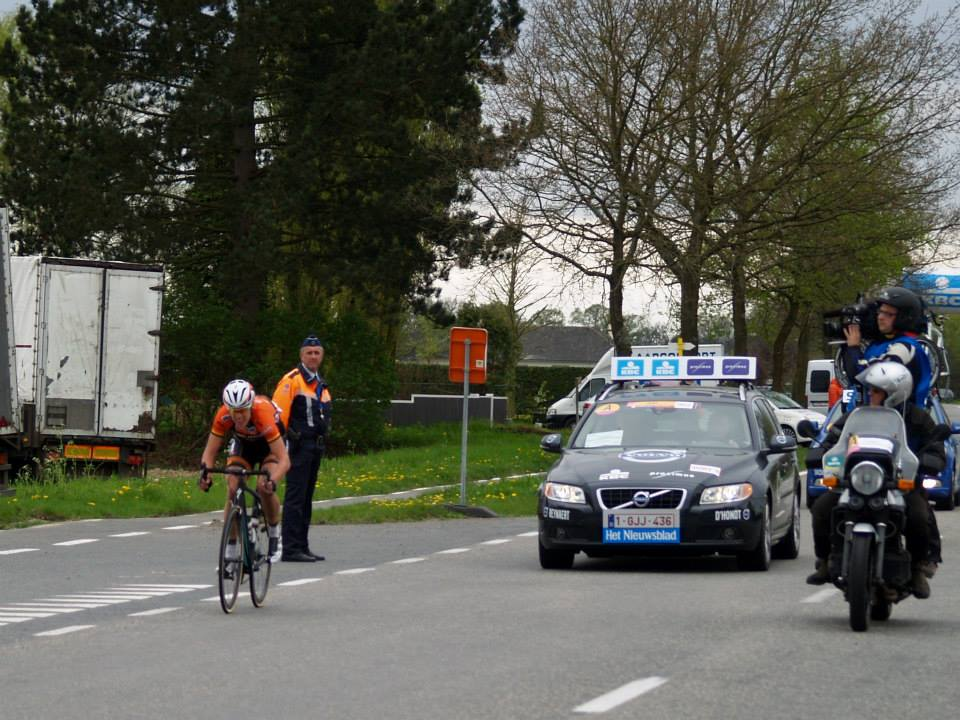
Ellen van Dijk riding solo to victory at the Tour of Flanders.

On 7 April Ellen van Dijk won the World Cup race Tour of Flanders after a solo of 30 kilometres. Van Dijk attacked on the Kruisberg and built up an advantage of over a minute on the chasers Armitstead, Johansson (Orica–AIS) and Elisa Longo Borghini (Hitec Products). Behind Van Dijk, Armitstead won the sprint of the chasing group ahead of Johansson. According to Van Dijk it was after her time trial victory at the World Championships in 2013, her major victory of her career. At the Energiewacht Tour the team had several podium spots, without winning a stage. Armitstead finished second in stage 1 and third in stage 2 and 4. In stage3b, a team time trial over 15.1 km, the team finished second behind Specialized–lululemon. At the World Cup race La Flèche Wallonne Féminine Armitstead was one of the fastest riding up the final hill but was beaten just before the finish line on the top by Pauline Ferrand-Prévot (Rabo Liv). It was her third consecutive second place in a World Cup race. Ellen van Dijk closed with a 10th place the top-10. At the end of April, Ellen van Dijk won for the third consecutive the time trial at the Omloop van Borsele. The day afterwards Van Dijk finished third in the road race that ended with a bunch sprint.

=== May ===
At the Festival Luxembourgeois du cyclisme féminin Elsy Jacobs begin May, Ellen van Dijk finished second in the prologue, two seconds behind Marianne Vos. Apart from that the stage race didn't bring really results for the team. On the same day of the prologue Nina Kessler finished third at the Ronde van Overijssel. In the inaugural British Women's Tour, Armitstead had between stage 2 and stage 4 the red jersey for the best British rider, but lost it in the last stage to Lucy Garner. After stage 4 Emma Trott announced that she would retire from professional cycling after the inaugural Women's Tour ends on 11 June. She didn't want to be a professional cyclist anymore and moved to New Zealand. At the same time The Women's Tour took place, Megan Guarnier was in Mexico for the Pan American Cycling Championships. She won the bronze medal in the time trial on 8 May and two days later the silver medal in the road race. Later the month she also won the silver medal in the road race at the United States National Road Race Championships.

The main riders of the team didn't go to China for the Tour of Chongming Island World Cup and the Tour of Chongming Island (stage race), including World Cup leader Armitstead and Ellen van Dijk. Kessler was the best rider of the team in the World Cup race and finished 17th. At the end of May, at the Boels Rental Hills Classic sponsored by the team sponsor, Ellen van Dijk and Katarzyna Pawłowska were part of front group that consisted of six riders. At the end of the race the front group consisted of three riders including Van Dijk. With an uphill finish, Van Dijk lost the sprint from Johansson (Orica–AIS) and finished second ahead of Amy Pieters (Giant-Shimano). Van Dijk won the mountain classification of the race.

=== June: Spain and National Championships ===
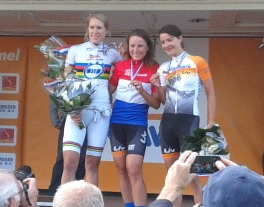
Ellen van Dijk won silver at the Dutch Time Trial Championships, only 0.02 seconds behind Annemiek van Vleuten.

After the recon of the World Championships courses in Ponferrada, the team started in the Spanish Durango-Durango Emakumeen Saria. After the last climb of the race, Lizzie Armitstead was at the front with only a few rirders. At the finish Armitstead was beaten by Marianne Vos (Rabo Liv) and finished second. A few days later started the stage race Emakumeen Euskal Bira. Armitstead finished fourth and second in the first two stages and Megan Guarnier finished twice fifth in the later two stages, concluding with the sixth place overall. At the end of the month were the national championships in Europe. Christine Majerus won in Luxembourg both the time trial and the road race. In the Netherlands, the teams' home county, Ellen van Dijk finished second at the Dutch National Time Trial Championships, only 0.02 seconds behind Annemiek van Vleuten (Rabo Liv). Katarzyna Pawłowska also finished second at the national time trial championships in Poland. Armitstead won bronze at the British National Road Race Championships.

=== July: Stage races ===
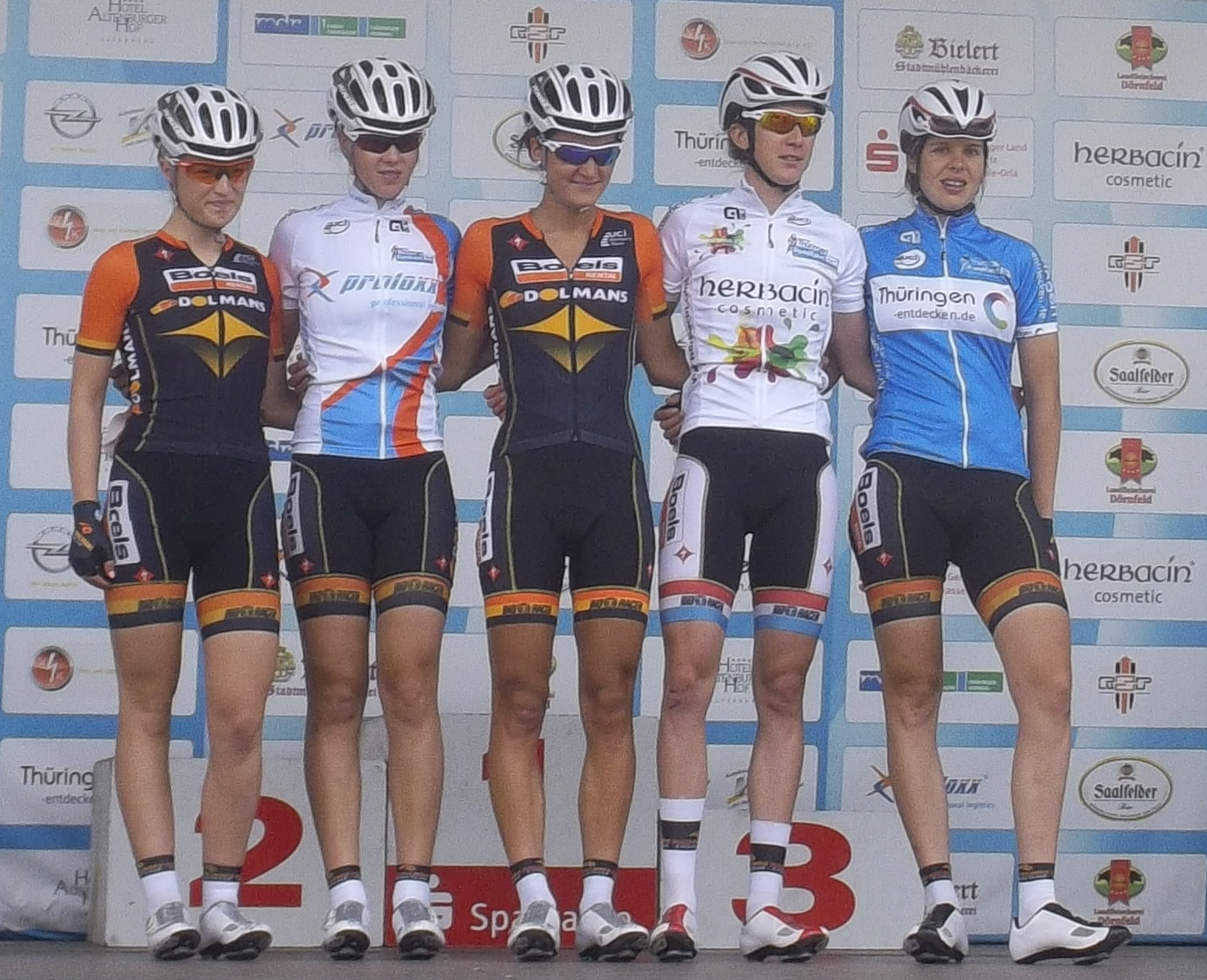
Boels–Dolmans line up at the Thüringen Rundfahrt der Frauen.

The team aimed with Megan Guarnier for a top-5 in the overall standings at the Giro d'Italia Femminile. After the prologue where Ellen van Dijk finished eight, Guarnier finished fifth in the first stage. She was in eighth position in the general classification and climbed up to the fifth place after stage 2. After losing time in stage 6, she was in tenth place in the overall standings. However, she rode strong in stage eight where she finished 5th and climbed up to the 7th place in the general classification where she also ended after the concluding ninth stage. Other riders of the team started the day afterwards in the Thüringen Rundfahrt der Frauen, where the team was on the podium after almost every stage. Christine Majerus finished second in the prologue behind Lisa Brennauer. Demi de Jong was the best youngest rider. Lizzie Armitstead won the first stage beating Lisa Brennauer and Evelyn Stevens both from Specialized–lululemon on the line. She took the lead in the points and mountains classification. Romy Kasper won in her own neighborhood stage 2, including the combative award, after beating her breakaway companion Reta Trotman. It was for Kapser her first international victory. Armitstead finished third. De Jong lost after this stage the best young rider's jersey. In stage 4, Armitstead rode again clear with Stevens, but this time she lost from her on the line and finished second. In the fifth stage Armitstead won the bunch sprint behind the breakaway group of two riders. After the final stage 6 Armitstead finished second in the general classification. After keeping the points classification jersey after stage 2 and losing her mountains classification jersey a few times, Armitstead both won the overall points and mountains classification. The team also started in the BeNe Ladies Tour with as best results a fourth place in the final stage 2b for Megan Guarnier.

At the first edition of the La Course by Le Tour de France, on the same course and same day as the last stage of the men's Tour de France, Ellen van Dijk attacked multiple times and was the only women who was able to get clear for a few laps with a maximal advantage of over half a minute. Besides of her Armitstead and Kasper attempted to ride away from the peloton, but none were successful. The race ended with a bunch sprint. Armitstead felt in the last kilometre and the team did not finish in the top-10.

=== August–September ===
At the Open de Suède Vårgårda TTT, the team finished third in the team time trial, with a good prospect of the team's goal to win a medal at the World Championships. In begin September Ellen van Dijk won the time trial of the Boels Rental Ladies Tour, with a 12 seconds gap over her main rival Lisa Brennauer. Her first international time trial victory of the season. With the other stages ending in a bunch sprint and sprinters winning the bonification seconds, Van Dijk finished third in the general classification. A final time trial test for Ellen van Dijk before the World Championships was the Chrono Champenois ITT. Halfway the 33.40 kilometres (20.8 miles) time trial she had a 39 seconds advantage over Hanna Solovey, but she finished second 8 seconds behind her because she lost about a minute after riding the wrong direction.

== Season victories ==
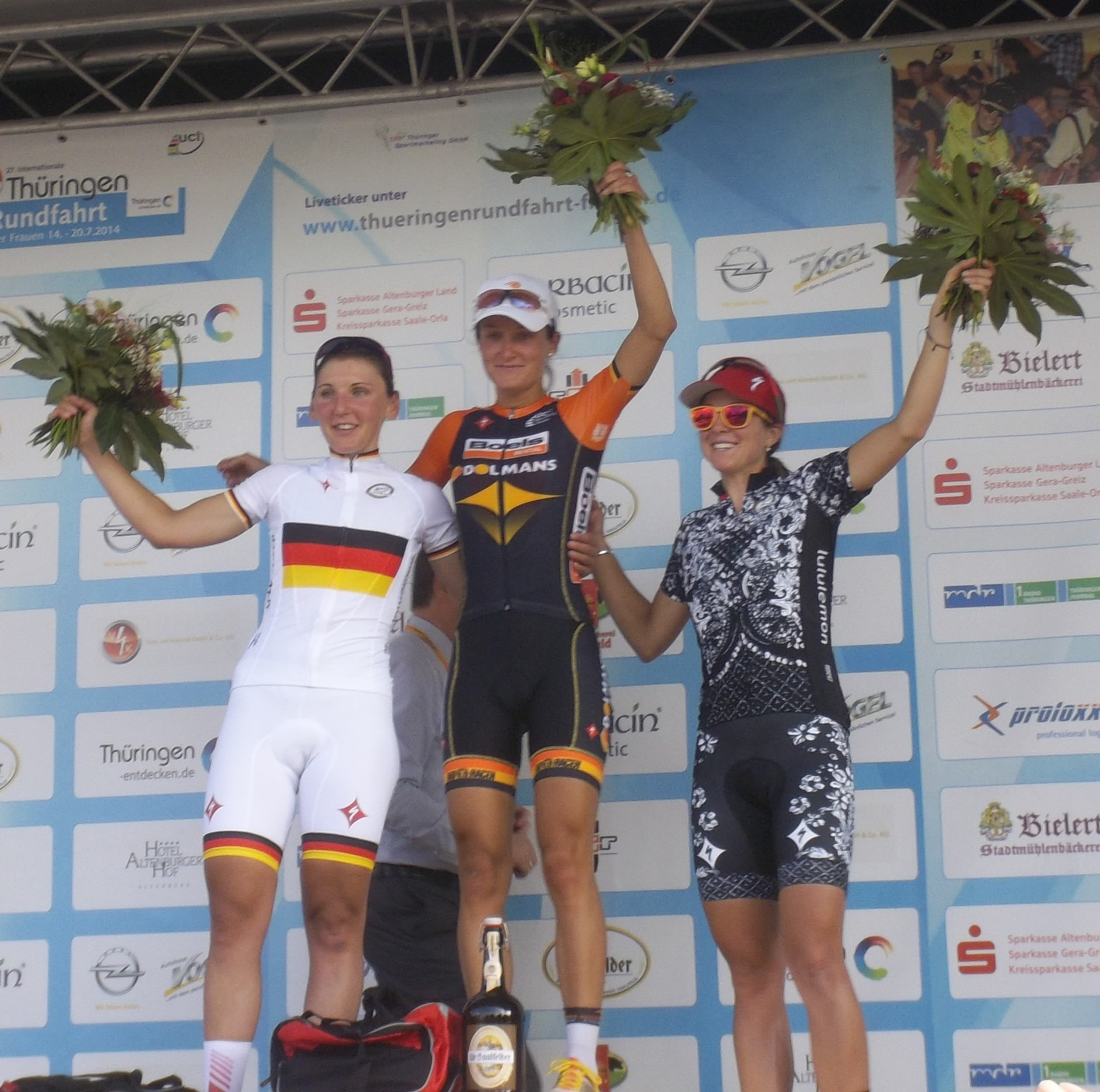
Lizzie Armitstead after winning Stage 1 Internationale Thüringen Rundfahrt der Frauen.

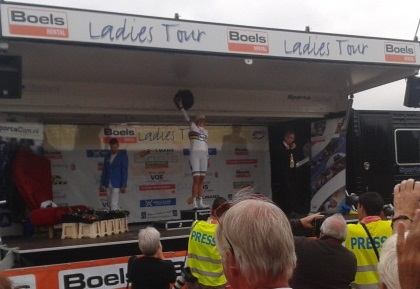
Ellen van Dijk after winning the time trial at the Boels Rental Ladies Tour

Single day and stage races 2014
Date	Country	Race	Cat.	Winner
9 March	Belgium	Omloop van het Hageland	1.2	(United Kingdom) Lizzie Armitstead
15 March	Netherlands	Ronde van Drenthe	CDM	(United Kingdom) Lizzie Armitstead
25 April	Netherlands	Omloop van Borsele (time trial)	Nat.	(Netherlands) Ellen van Dijk
6 April	Belgium	Tour of Flanders for Women	CDM	(Netherlands) Ellen van Dijk
30 May	Netherlands	Mountains classification Boels Rental Hills Classic	1.1	(Netherlands) Ellen van Dijk
15 July	Germany	Stage 1 Internationale Thüringen Rundfahrt der Frauen	2.1	(United Kingdom) Lizzie Armitstead
16 July	Germany	Stage 2 Internationale Thüringen Rundfahrt der Frauen	2.1	(Germany) Romy Kasper
16 July	Germany	Stage 2 Combativity award Internationale Thüringen Rundfahrt der Frauen	2.1	(Germany) Romy Kasper
20 July	Germany	Points classification Internationale Thüringen Rundfahrt der Frauen	2.1	(United Kingdom) Lizzie Armitstead
20 July	Germany	Mountains classification Internationale Thüringen Rundfahrt der Frauen	2.1	(United Kingdom) Lizzie Armitstead
3 August	United Kingdom	Commonwealth Games – Women's road race		(United Kingdom) Lizzie Armitstead
30 August	Worldwide	2014 UCI Women's Road World Cup	CDM	(United Kingdom) Lizzie Armitstead
2 September	Netherlands	Stage 1 Boels Rental Ladies Tour (time trial)	2.1	(Netherlands) Ellen van Dijk

National, Continental and World champions 2014
Date	Discipline	Jersey	Winner
26 June	Luxembourgish National Time Trial Champion		Christine Majerus
29 June	Luxembourgish National Road Race Champion		Christine Majerus

== Results in major races ==
=== Single day races ===
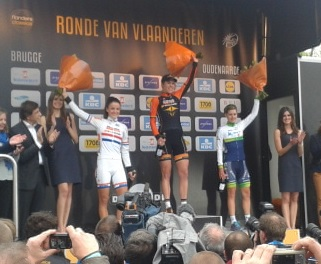
Ellen van Dijk won the Tour of Flanders, with Lizzie Armitstead finishing in second place.

Results at the 2014 World Cup races
Date	#	Race	Best rider	Place
15 March	1	Ronde van Drenthe	(United Kingdom) Lizzie Armitstead	1st
30 March	2	Trofeo Alfredo Binda-Comune di Cittiglio	(United Kingdom) Lizzie Armitstead	2nd
6 April	3	Tour of Flanders	(Netherlands) Ellen van Dijk	1st
23 April	4	La Flèche Wallonne Féminine	(United Kingdom) Lizzie Armitstead	2nd
18 May	5	Tour of Chongming Island	(Netherlands) Nina Kessler	17th
3 August	6	Sparkassen Giro	(Luxembourg) Christine Majerus	6th
22 August	7	Open de Suède Vårgårda TTT	Boels–Dolmans Cycling Team	3rd
24 August	8	Open de Suède Vårgårda	(United Kingdom) Lizzie Armitstead	8th
30 August	9	GP de Plouay	(United Kingdom) Lizzie Armitstead	8th
Final individual classification			(United Kingdom) Lizzie Armitstead	1st
Final team classification			Boels–Dolmans Cycling team	2nd

Other major single day races
Date	Race	Best rider	Place
27 July	La Course by Le Tour de France	(Luxembourg) Christine Majerus	16th
21 September	UCI Road World Championships – Women's team time trial	Boels–Dolmans Cycling Team	5th
23 September	UCI Road World Championships – Women's time trial (Note: Riders are part of the national team)	(Netherlands) Ellen van Dijk	7th
27 September	UCI Road World Championships – Women's road race (Note: Riders are part of the national team)	(United Kingdom) Lizzie Armitstead	7th

=== Grand Tours ===
Results of the team in the grand tours
Grand tour	Giro d'Italia Femminile
Rider (classification)	Megan Guarnier (7th)
Victories	0 stage win

== UCI World Ranking ==
The 2014 UCI Women's Road Rankings are rankings based upon the results in all UCI-sanctioned races of the 2014 women's road cycling season.

Boels–Dolmans Cycling Team finished third in the 2014 ranking for UCI teams.

Individual world ranking
Rank	Rider	Points
3	(United Kingdom) Lizzie Armitstead	923.25
12	(Netherlands) Ellen van Dijk	576.25
26	(United States) Megan Guarnier	297.25
37	(Luxembourg) Christine Majerus	185.25
72	(Netherlands) Nina Kessler	98
86	(Belgium) Jessie Daams	86
103	(Germany) Romy Kasper	52
112	(Poland) Katarzyna Pawłowska	47
136	(Netherlands) Janneke Ensing	38
425	(Netherlands) Demi de Jong	4.25
