= 2014 Holland Ladies Tour =

2014 Boels Rental Ladies Tour
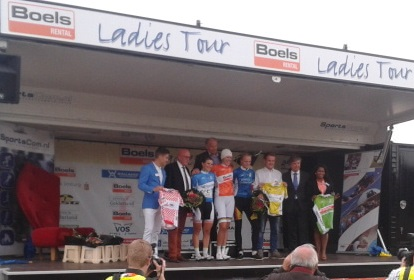
- The jerseys lined-up

Race details
- Dates: 2–7 September 2014
- Stages: 6

The 2014 Boels Ladies Tour also known as the 2014 Holland Ladies Tour is the 17th edition of the Holland Ladies Tour, a women's cycle stage race in the Netherlands. The tour is part of the 2014 women's road cycling calendar and will be held from 2 September to 7 September. The tour has six stages, it starts with an individual trial over 10.1 km (6.3 mi) in Tiel and concludes with a hilly stage in Limburg. The tour has an UCI rating of 2.1.

Ellen van Dijk won the tour in 2013 and will defend her title.

== Teams ==
20 teams of maximal 6 riders take part.

UCI teams

- Boels–Dolmans
- Rabobank-Liv Woman Cycling Team
- Specialized–lululemon
- Orica–AIS
- Giant–Shimano
- Alé–Cipollini
- Hitec Products UCK
- Astana BePink
- Lotto–Belisol Ladies
- Bigla Cycling Team
- TIBCO–To The Top
- Parkhotel Valkenburg Continental Team

Other teams

- RC Jan van Arckel
- De Jonge Renner
- MIX Futurumshop Zannata-NWVG
- Restore Cycling
- Swaboladies.nl

National teams

- Italy
- United States
- Belgium

== Stages ==
Legend
Yellow jersey	Denotes the leader of the General classification	Green jersey	Denotes the leader of the Points classification
White jersey	Denotes the leader of the Sprint classification		Denotes the leader of the Young rider classification
Mountains jersey	Denotes the leader of the Mountains classification		Denotes the Combative rider

=== Stage 1 (ITT) ===
2 September – Varik to Tiel, 10.1 km (6.3 mi)

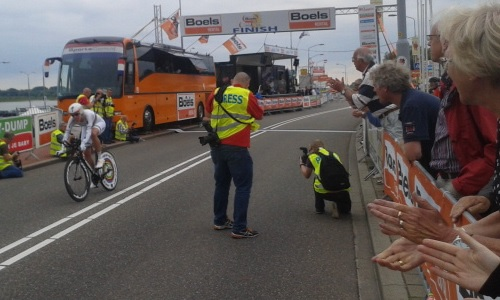
Finish of Ellen van Dijk

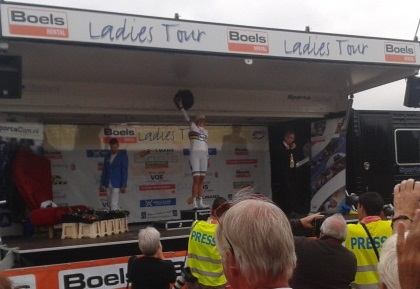
Ellen van Dijk on the podium

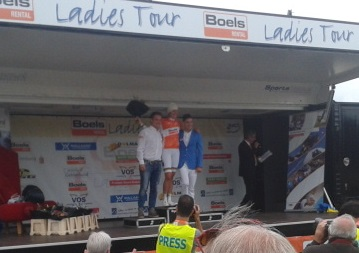
Ellen van Dijk in the orange leading jersey

The first stage of the Boels Rental Ladies Tour was a time trial of 10.1 km (6.3 mi) over the dike between Varik and Tiel. The course was flat but there was head wind during the race.

World Time Trial Champion Ellen van Dijk (Boels–Dolmans) won the time trial 12 seconds ahead of Lisa Brennauer and 24 seconds ahead of Trixi Worrack (both Specialized–lululemon). Van Dijk said after the race that the time trial was very hard and she started a bit too fast. Furthermore, she said that she was very happy with the victory. She invested a lot of time in the time trial the last period and was pleased that after several second places in time trials this year she now took home the victory.

Stage 1 result & General classification

	Rider	Team	Time
1	Ellen van Dijk (NED)	Boels–Dolmans	13' 15"
2	Lisa Brennauer (GER)	Specialized–lululemon	+ 12"
3	Trixi Worrack (GER)	Specialized–lululemon	+ 24"
4	Marianne Vos (NED)	Rabobank-Liv Woman Cycling Team	+ 29"
5	Ann-Sophie Duyck (BEL)	Belgium (National team)	+ 30"
6	Evelyn Stevens (USA)	Specialized–lululemon	+ 31"
7	Lizzie Armitstead (GBR)	Boels–Dolmans	+ 35"
8	Emma Johansson (SWE)	Orica–AIS	+ 35"
9	Karol-Ann Canuel (CAN)	Specialized–lululemon	+ 38"
10	Alison Tetrick (USA)	Astana BePink	+ 38"

=== Stage 2 ===
3 September – Tiel to Tiel, 120.1 km (74.6 mi)

500 m (1,640.4 ft) before the finish the last two leaders Willeke Knol (Giant–Shimano) en Carmen Small (Specialized–lululemon) were pulled back by the bunch. They were in the attack together with Anouska Koster (Futurumshop-NWVG) and Michela Pavin (Alé–Cipollini) for over 50 km (31.1 mi). The race ended in a bunch sprint won by Lisa Brennauer (Specialized–lululemon) ahead of Jolien D'Hoore (Lotto–Belisol Ladies) and Marianne Vos (Rabobank-Liv Woman Cycling Team). Ellen van Dijk (Boels–Dolmans) kept her lead in the general classification. But with Brennauer taking 10 bonification seconds at the finish line, she is now less than a second in second place behind Van Dijk in the classification.

Stage 2 result

	Rider	Team	Time
1	Lisa Brennauer (GER)	Specialized–lululemon	2h 46' 34"
2	Jolien D'Hoore (BEL)	Lotto–Belisol Ladies	s.t.
3	Marianne Vos (NED)	Rabobank-Liv Woman Cycling Team	s.t.
4	Lizzie Armitstead (GBR)	Boels–Dolmans	s.t.
5	Barbara Guarischi (ITA)	Alé–Cipollini	s.t.
6	Trixi Worrack (GER)	Specialized–lululemon	s.t.
7	Shelley Olds (USA)	Alé–Cipollini	+ 2"
8	Ellen van Dijk (NED)	Boels–Dolmans	+ 2"
9	Chantal Blaak (NED)	Specialized–lululemon	+ 2"
10	Maria Giulia Confalonieri (ITA)	Estado de México–Faren Kuota	+ 2"

General Classification after Stage 2

	Rider	Team	Time
1	Ellen van Dijk (NED)	Boels–Dolmans	2h 59' 51"
2	Lisa Brennauer (GER)	Specialized–lululemon	+ 0"
3	Marianne Vos (NED)	Rabobank-Liv Woman Cycling Team	+ 21"
4	Trixi Worrack (GER)	Specialized–lululemon	+ 22"
5	Ann-Sophie Duyck (BEL)	Belgium (National team)	+ 30"
6	Lizzie Armitstead (GBR)	Boels–Dolmans	+ 32"
7	Emma Johansson (SWE)	Orica–AIS	+ 35"
8	Evelyn Stevens (USA)	Specialized–lululemon	+ 41"
9	Chantal Blaak (NED)	Specialized–lululemon	+ 45"
10	Carmen Small (USA)	Specialized–lululemon	+ 47"

=== Stage 3 ===
4 September – Heeze to Leende, 128.2 km (79.7 mi)

Stage 3 result

	Rider	Team	Time
1	Marianne Vos (NED)	Rabobank-Liv Woman Cycling Team	3h 07' 38"
2	Jolien D'Hoore (BEL)	Lotto–Belisol Ladies	s.t.
3	Lizzie Armitstead (GBR)	Boels–Dolmans	s.t.
4	Lisa Brennauer (GER)	Specialized–lululemon	s.t.
5	Trixi Worrack (GER)	Specialized–lululemon	s.t.
6	Barbara Guarischi (ITA)	Alé–Cipollini	s.t.
7	Ellen van Dijk (NED)	Boels–Dolmans	s.t.
8	Maria Giulia Confalonieri (ITA)	Estado de México–Faren Kuota	s.t.
9	Shelley Olds (USA)	Alé–Cipollini	s.t.
10	Emilie Moberg (NOR)	Hitec Products	s.t.

General Classification after Stage 3

	Rider	Team	Time
1	Ellen van Dijk (NED)	Boels–Dolmans	6h 07' 29"
2	Lisa Brennauer (GER)	Specialized–lululemon	+ 0"
3	Marianne Vos (NED)	Rabobank-Liv Woman Cycling Team	+ 8"
4	Trixi Worrack (GER)	Specialized–lululemon	+ 22"
5	Lizzie Armitstead (GBR)	Boels–Dolmans	+ 26"
6	Ann-Sophie Duyck (BEL)	Belgium (National team)	+ 30"
7	Emma Johansson (SWE)	Orica–AIS	+ 35"
8	Evelyn Stevens (USA)	Specialized–lululemon	+ 41"
9	Chantal Blaak (NED)	Specialized–lululemon	+ 45"
10	Carmen Small (USA)	Specialized–lululemon	+ 47"

=== Stage 4 ===
5 September – Gennep to Gennep, 123.4 km (76.7 mi)

Stage 4 result

	Rider	Team	Time
1	Kelly Druyts (BEL)	Topsport Vlaanderen–Pro-Duo	2h 56' 16"
2	Małgorzata Jasińska (POL)	Alé–Cipollini	s.t.
3	Romy Kasper (GER)	Boels–Dolmans	s.t.
4	Sabrina Stultiens (NED)	Rabobank-Liv Woman Cycling Team	s.t.
5	Jacqueline Hahn (AUT)	Bigla Cycling Team	s.t.
6	Bianca van den Hoek (NED)	Parkhotel Valkenburg Continental Team	s.t.
7	Jessie MacLean (AUS)	Orica–AIS	s.t.
8	Claudia Lichtenberg (GER)	Giant–Shimano	s.t.
9	Nike Beckeringh (NED)		s.t.
10	Alison Tetrick (USA)	Astana BePink	s.t.

General Classification after Stage 4

	Rider	Team	Time
1	Evelyn Stevens (USA)	Specialized–lululemon	9h 04' 24"
2	Lisa Brennauer (GER)	Specialized–lululemon	+ 7"
3	Ellen van Dijk (NED)	Boels–Dolmans	+ 9"
4	Alison Tetrick (USA)	Astana BePink	+ 9"
5	Małgorzata Jasińska (POL)	Alé–Cipollini	+ 26"
6	Claudia Lichtenberg (GER)	Giant–Shimano	+ 30"
7	Trixi Worrack (GER)	Specialized–lululemon	+ 34"
8	Jessie MacLean (AUS)	Orica–AIS	+ 34"
9	Lizzie Armitstead (GBR)	Boels–Dolmans	+ 36"
10	Ann-Sophie Duyck (BEL)	Belgium (National team)	+ 40"

=== Stage 5 ===
6 September – Wijchen to Wijchen, 117.8 km (73.2 mi)

Stage 5 result

	Rider	Team	Time
1	Jolien D'Hoore (BEL)	Lotto–Intermarché Ladies	2h 59' 10"
2	Shelley Olds (USA)	Alé–Cipollini	s.t.
3	Lisa Brennauer (GER)	Specialized–lululemon	s.t.
4	Annette Edmondson (AUS)	Orica–AIS	s.t.
5	Emma Johansson (SWE)	Orica–AIS	s.t.
6	Ellen van Dijk (NED)	Boels–Dolmans	s.t.
7	Barbara Guarischi (ITA)	Alé–Cipollini	s.t.
8	Christine Majerus (LUX)	Boels–Dolmans	s.t.
9	Amy Pieters (NED)	Giant–Shimano	s.t.
10	Elisa Longo Borghini (ITA)	Team Hitec Products	s.t.

General Classification after Stage 5

	Rider	Team	Time
1	Evelyn Stevens (USA)	Specialized–lululemon	12h 03' 34"
2	Lisa Brennauer (GER)	Specialized–lululemon	+ 3"
3	Ellen van Dijk (NED)	Boels–Dolmans	+ 9"
4	Alison Tetrick (USA)	Astana BePink	+ 13"
5	Małgorzata Jasińska (POL)	Alé–Cipollini	+ 30"
6	Claudia Lichtenberg (GER)	Giant–Shimano	+ 31"
7	Lizzie Armitstead (GBR)	Boels–Dolmans	+ 36"
8	Jessie MacLean (AUS)	Orica–AIS	+ 38"
9	Ann-Sophie Duyck (BEL)	Belgium (National team)	+ 44"
10	Emma Johansson (SWE)	Orica–AIS	+ 45"

=== Stage 6 ===
7 September – Bunde to Berg en Terblijt, 103.61 km (64.4 mi)

Stage 6 result

	Rider	Team	Time
1	Emma Johansson (SWE)	Orica–AIS	2h 49' 03"
2	Tatiana Guderzo (ITA)	Alé–Cipollini	+ 3"
3	Katarzyna Niewiadoma (POL)	Rabobank-Liv Woman Cycling Team	s.t.
4	Evelyn Stevens (USA)	Specialized–lululemon	s.t.
5	Ellen van Dijk (NED)	Boels–Dolmans	s.t.
6	Lisa Brennauer (GER)	Specialized–lululemon	s.t.
7	Elisa Longo Borghini (ITA)	Team Hitec Products	s.t.
8	Megan Guarnier (USA)	Boels–Dolmans	s.t.
9	Claudia Lichtenberg (GER)	Giant–Shimano	s.t.
10	Roxane Knetemann (NED)	Boels–Dolmans	+ 30"

General Classification after Stage 6

	Rider	Team	Time
1	Evelyn Stevens (USA)	Specialized–lululemon	14h 52' 38"
2	Lisa Brennauer (GER)	Specialized–lululemon	+ 5"
3	Ellen van Dijk (NED)	Boels–Dolmans	+ 11"
4	Claudia Lichtenberg (GER)	Giant–Shimano	+ 33"
5	Emma Johansson (SWE)	Orica–AIS	+ 34"
6	Elisa Longo Borghini (ITA)	Team Hitec Products	+ 1' 03"
7	Tatiana Guderzo (ITA)	Alé–Cipollini	+ 1' 05"
8	Katarzyna Niewiadoma (POL)	Rabobank-Liv Woman Cycling Team	+ 1' 18"
9	Małgorzata Jasińska (POL)	Alé–Cipollini	+ 1' 25"
10	Megan Guarnier (USA)	Boels–Dolmans	+ 1' 35"

== Classification leadership ==
Stage	Winner	General classification	Points classification	Sprint classification	Young rider classification	Mountains classification	Combative rider	Team classification
1	Ellen van Dijk	Ellen van Dijk	Ellen van Dijk	Ann-Sophie Duyck	Elisa Longo Borghini	Evelyn Stevens	Henriette Woering	Specialized–lululemon
2	Lisa Brennauer	Ellen van Dijk	Lisa Brennauer	Anouska Koster	Elisa Longo Borghini	Katarzyna Niewiadoma	Willeke Knol	Specialized–lululemon
3	Marianne Vos	Ellen van Dijk	Lisa Brennauer	Sara Mustonen	Elisa Longo Borghini	Katarzyna Niewiadoma	Valentina Scandolara	Specialized–lululemon
4	Kelly Druyts	Evelyn Stevens	Lisa Brennauer	Sara Mustonen	Elisa Longo Borghini	Valentina Scandolara	Alison Tetrick	Specialized–lululemon
5	Jolien D'Hoore	Evelyn Stevens	Jolien D'Hoore	Sara Mustonen	Elisa Longo Borghini	Katarzyna Niewiadoma	Ilona Hoeksma	Specialized–lululemon
6	Emma Johansson	Evelyn Stevens	Lisa Brennauer	Sara Mustonen	Elisa Longo Borghini	Katarzyna Niewiadoma	Roxane Knetemann	Specialized–lululemon
Final Classification		Evelyn Stevens	Lisa Brennauer	Sara Mustonen	Elisa Longo Borghini	Katarzyna Niewiadoma		Specialized–lululemon

== See also ==
- 2014 in women's road cycling
