= 2014 Energiewacht Tour =

Race details
- Dates: 9 April–13 April
- Stages: 6
- Distance: 562.7 km (349.6 mi)
- Winning time: 14h 09' 38"

Results
Jersey awarded to the overall winner	Winner	Lucinda Brand (NED)	(Rabobank-Liv Woman Cycling Team)
	Second	Vera Koedooder (NED)	(Bigla Cycling Team)
	Third	Trixi Worrack (DEU)	(Specialized–lululemon)
Jersey awarded to the points classification winner	Points	Kirsten Wild (NED)	(Team Giant–Shimano)
Jersey awarded to the young rider classification winner	Young rider	Thalita de Jong (NED)	(Rabobank-Liv Woman Cycling Team)
Jersey awarded to the sprints classification winner	Sprints	Marta Tagliaferro (ITA)	(Alé Cipollini)
	Team	Specialized–lululemon	

The 2014 Energiewacht Tour is a stage race held in the Netherlands, with a UCI rating of 2.2, from 9 April to 13 April.

Ellen van Dijk won the tour in 2013.

== Stages ==
=== Stage 1 ===
9 April 2014 – Delfzijl to Delfzijl, 93 km (57.8 mi)

Stage 1 result

	Rider	Team	Time
1	Kirsten Wild (NED)	Team Giant–Shimano	2h 16' 10"
2	Lizzie Armitstead (GBR)	Boels–Dolmans	s.t.
3	Jolien D'Hoore (BEL)	Lotto–Belisol Ladies	s.t.
4	Barbara Guarischi (ITA)	Alé Cipollini	s.t.
5	Gracie Elvin (AUS)	Orica–AIS	s.t.
6	Thalita de Jong (NED)	Rabobank-Liv Woman Cycling Team	s.t.
7	Martina Zwick (GER)	Bigla Cycling Team	s.t.
8	Emilie Moberg (NOR)	Hitec Products	s.t.
9	Marta Tagliaferro (ITA)	Alé Cipollini	s.t.
10	Roxane Fournier (FRA)	France (national team)	s.t.

General Classification after Stage 1

	Rider	Team	Time
1	Kirsten Wild (NED)	Team Giant–Shimano	2h 15' 57"
2	Lizzie Armitstead (GBR)	Boels–Dolmans	+ 5"
3	Jolien D'Hoore (BEL)	Lotto–Belisol Ladies	+ 9"
4	Elena Cecchini (ITA)	Estado de México–Faren Kuota	+ 12"
5	Barbara Guarischi (ITA)	Alé Cipollini	+ 13"
6	Gracie Elvin (AUS)	Orica–AIS	+ 13"
7	Thalita de Jong (NED)	Rabobank-Liv Woman Cycling Team	+ 13"
8	Martina Zwick (GER)	Bigla Cycling Team	+ 13"
9	Emilie Moberg (NOR)	Hitec Products	+ 13"
10	Marta Tagliaferro (ITA)	Alé Cipollini	+ 13"

=== Stage 2 ===
10 April 2014 – Westerwolde to Westerwolde, 116.1 km (72.1 mi)

Stage 2 result

	Rider	Team	Time
1	Kirsten Wild (NED)	Team Giant–Shimano	2h 47' 28"
2	Barbara Guarischi (ITA)	Alé Cipollini	s.t.
3	Lizzie Armitstead (GBR)	Boels–Dolmans	s.t.
4	Jolien D'Hoore (BEL)	Lotto–Belisol Ladies	s.t.
5	Elena Cecchini (ITA)	Estado de México–Faren Kuota	s.t.
6	Martina Zwick (GER)	Bigla Cycling Team	s.t.
7	Aurore Verhoeven (FRA)	Lointek	s.t.
8	Kim de Baat (NED)	Parkhotel Valkenburg Continental Team	s.t.
9	Gracie Elvin (AUS)	Orica–AIS	s.t.
10	Lotta Lepistö (FIN)	Bigla Cycling Team	s.t.

General Classification after Stage 2

	Rider	Team	Time
1	Kirsten Wild (NED)	Team Giant–Shimano	5h 03' 13"
2	Lizzie Armitstead (GBR)	Boels–Dolmans	+ 10"
3	Barbara Guarischi (ITA)	Alé Cipollini	+ 19"
4	Jolien D'Hoore (BEL)	Lotto–Belisol Ladies	+ 21"
5	Marta Tagliaferro (ITA)	Alé Cipollini	+ 24"
6	Elena Cecchini (ITA)	Estado de México–Faren Kuota	+ 24"
7	Martina Zwick (GER)	Bigla Cycling Team	+ 25"
8	Gracie Elvin (AUS)	Orica–AIS	+ 25"
9	Lotta Lepistö (FIN)	Bigla Cycling Team	+25"
10	Emilie Moberg (NOR)	Hitec Products	+ 25"

=== Stage 3a ===
11 April 2014 – Tynaarlo to Tynaarlo, 97.1 km (60.3 mi)

Stage 3a Result

	Rider	Team	Time
1	Vera Koedooder (NED)	Bigla Cycling Team	2h 24' 52"
2	Chloe McConville (AUS)	Australia (National Team)	+ 2' 22"
3	Trixi Worrack (GER)	Specialized–lululemon	+ 3' 02"
4	Barbara Guarischi (ITA)	Alé Cipollini	+ 3' 02"
5	Marta Tagliaferro (ITA)	Alé Cipollini	+ 3' 02"
6	Roxane Fournier (FRA)	France (National Team)	+ 3' 02"
7	Carmen Small (USA)	Specialized–lululemon	+ 3' 02"
8	Emilie Moberg (NOR)	Norway (National Team)	+ 3' 02"
9	Kirsten Wild (NED)	Team Giant–Shimano	+ 3' 02"
10	Eline Gleditsch Brustad (NOR)	Norway (National Team)	+ 3' 02"

General Classification after Stage 3a

	Rider	Team	Time
1	Vera Koedooder (NED)	Bigla Cycling Team	7h 29' 57"
2	Kirsten Wild (NED)	Team Giant–Shimano	+ 1' 09"
3	Barbara Guarischi (ITA)	Alé Cipollini	+ 1' 29"
4	Jolien D'Hoore (BEL)	Lotto–Belisol Ladies	+ 1' 31"
5	Trixi Worrack (GER)	Specialized–lululemon	+ 1' 33"
6	Marta Tagliaferro (ITA)	Alé Cipollini	+ 1' 34"
7	Elena Cecchini (ITA)	Estado de México–Faren Kuota	+ 1' 34"
8	Martina Zwick (GER)	Bigla Cycling Team	+ 1' 35"
9	Gracie Elvin (AUS)	Orica–AIS	+ 1' 35"
10	Lotta Lepistö (FIN)	Bigla Cycling Team	+ 1' 35"

=== Stage 3b ===
11 April 2014 – Oldambt, 15.1 km (9.4 mi), team time trial (TTT)

Stage 3b Result

	Team	Time
1	Specialized–lululemon	19' 22"
2	Boels–Dolmans	+ 7"
3	Rabobank-Liv Woman Cycling Team	+ 14"
4	Orica–AIS	+ 16"
5	Team Giant–Shimano	+ 33"
6	RusVelo	+ 34"
7	Lotto–Belisol Ladies	+ 43"
8	Wiggle–Honda	+ 46"
9	Parkhotel Valkenburg Continental Team	+ 55"
10	Alé Cipollini	+ 58"

General Classification after Stage 3b

	Rider	Team	Time
1	Vera Koedooder (NED)	Bigla Cycling Team	7h 50' 21"
2	Trixi Worrack (GER)	Specialized–lululemon	+ 31"
3	Lisa Brennauer (GER)	Specialized–lululemon	+ 33"
4	Tiffany Cromwell (AUS)	Specialized–lululemon	+ 33"
5	Kirsten Wild (NED)	Team Giant–Shimano	+ 40"
6	Ellen van Dijk (NED)	Boels–Dolmans	+ 40"
7	Lucinda Brand (NED)	Rabobank-Liv Woman Cycling Team	+ 47"
8	Roxane Knetemann (NED)	Rabobank-Liv Woman Cycling Team	+ 47"
9	Gracie Elvin (AUS)	Orica–AIS	+ 49"
10	Amy Pieters (NED)	Team Giant–Shimano	+ 1' 06"

=== Stage 4 ===
12 April 2014 – Eemsmond to Eemsmond, 136.7 km (84.9 mi)

Stage 4 result

	Rider	Team	Time
1	Lucinda Brand (NED)	Rabobank-Liv Woman Cycling Team	3h 33' 42"
2	Jolien D'Hoore (BEL)	Lotto–Belisol Ladies	+ 1' 09"
3	Lizzie Armitstead (GBR)	Boels–Dolmans	+ 1' 09"
4	Trixi Worrack (GER)	Specialized–lululemon	+ 1' 09"
5	Barbara Guarischi (ITA)	Alé Cipollini	+ 1' 09"
6	Elena Cecchini (ITA)	Estado de México–Faren Kuota	+ 1' 09"
7	Kirsten Wild (NED)	Team Giant–Shimano	+ 1' 09"
8	Ellen van Dijk (NED)	Boels–Dolmans	+ 1' 09"
9	Lisa Brennauer (GER)	Specialized–lululemon	+ 1' 09"
10	Annemiek van Vleuten (NED)	Rabobank-Liv Woman Cycling Team	+ 1' 09"

General Classification after Stage 4

	Rider	Team	Time
1	Lucinda Brand (NED)	Rabobank-Liv Woman Cycling Team	11h 24' 40"
2	Vera Koedooder (NED)	Bigla Cycling Team	+ 32"
3	Trixi Worrack (GER)	Specialized–lululemon	+ 1' 01"
4	Lisa Brennauer (GER)	Specialized–lululemon	+ 1' 05"
5	Tiffany Cromwell (AUS)	Specialized–lululemon	+ 1' 05"
6	Kirsten Wild (NED)	Team Giant–Shimano	+ 1' 09"
7	Ellen van Dijk (NED)	Boels–Dolmans	+ 1' 12"
8	Roxane Knetemann (NED)	Rabobank-Liv Woman Cycling Team	+ 1' 19"
9	Gracie Elvin (AUS)	Orica–AIS	+ 1' 21"
10	Lizzie Armitstead (GBR)	Boels–Dolmans	+ 1' 34"

=== Stage 5 ===
13 April 2014 – Veendam to Veendam, 104.7 km (65.1 mi)

Stage 5 result

	Rider	Team	Time
1	Chantal Blaak (NED)	Specialized–lululemon	2h 43' 41"
2	Loes Gunnewijk (NED)	Orica–AIS	+ 1"
3	Thalita de Jong (NED)	Rabobank-Liv Woman Cycling Team	+ 24"
4	Sara Mustonen (SWE)	Team Giant–Shimano	+ 24"
5	Barbara Guarischi (ITA)	Alé Cipollini	+ 24"
6	Liesbet De Vocht (BEL)	Lotto–Belisol Ladies	+ 24"
7	Elena Cecchini (ITA)	Estado de México–Faren Kuota	+ 26"
8	Romy Kasper (GER)	Boels–Dolmans	+ 26"
9	Kirsten Wild (NED)	Team Giant–Shimano	+ 1' 15"
10	Jolien D'Hoore (BEL)	Lotto–Belisol Ladies	+ 1' 15"

Final General Classification

	Rider	Team	Time
1	Lucinda Brand (NED)	Rabobank-Liv Woman Cycling Team	14h 09' 38"
2	Vera Koedooder (NED)	Bigla Cycling Team	+ 37"
3	Trixi Worrack (GER)	Specialized–lululemon	+ 1' 01"
4	Barbara Guarischi (ITA)	Alé Cipollini	+ 1' 02"
5	Lisa Brennauer (GER)	Specialized–lululemon	+ 1' 05"
6	Tiffany Cromwell (AUS)	Specialized–lululemon	+ 1' 05"
7	Kirsten Wild (NED)	Team Giant–Shimano	+ 1' 07"
8	Ellen van Dijk (NED)	Boels–Dolmans	+ 1' 17"
9	Gracie Elvin (AUS)	Orica–AIS	+ 1' 21"
10	Roxane Knetemann (NED)	Rabobank-Liv Woman Cycling Team	+ 1' 24"

== Classification leadership table ==
denotes the rider with the lowest accumulated time and is the overall race leader
denotes the leader of the Points classification
denotes the leader of the Sprint classification
denotes the leader of the Combativity classification
denotes rider with the lowest accumulated time, who is under a specified age and leader of the Youth classification
denotes the leader of the Club classification, which consists of the rider with the best overall time from a non-UCI Women's team

Stage	Winner	General classification	Points classification	Sprints classification	Young rider classification	Combativity classification	Best club rider classification	Team classification
1	Kirsten Wild	Kirsten Wild	Kirsten Wild	Marta Tagliaferro	Elena Cecchini			
2	Kirsten Wild	Kirsten Wild	Kirsten Wild	Marta Tagliaferro	Elena Cecchini			
3a	Vera Koedooder	Vera Koedooder	Kirsten Wild	Marta Tagliaferro	Elena Cecchini			
3b (TTT)	Specialized–lululemon	Vera Koedooder	Kirsten Wild	Marta Tagliaferro	Ruth Winder			
4	Lucinda Brand	Lucinda Brand	Kirsten Wild	Marta Tagliaferro	Ruth Winder			
5	Chantal Blaak	Lucinda Brand	Kirsten Wild	Marta Tagliaferro	Thalita de Jong			
Final Classification		Lucinda Brand	Kirsten Wild	Marta Tagliaferro	Thalita de Jong			Specialized–lululemon

== See also ==
- 2014 in women's road cycling
