= 2014 Open de Suède Vårgårda TTT =

2014 Open de Suède Vårgårda Team time trial
2014 UCI Women's Road World Cup, race 7 of 9

Race details
- Dates: 22 August 2014
- Stages: 1
- Distance: 42.5 km (26.4 mi)
- Winning time: 52' 12"

Results
	Winner	Specialized–lululemon
	Second	Rabobank-Liv Woman Cycling Team
	Third	Team SD Worx–Protime

== Results ==
	Team	Time
1	Specialized–lululemon; Trixi Worrack (GER); Evelyn Stevens (USA); Karol-Ann Canuel (CAN); Lisa Brennauer (GER); Chantal Blaak (NED)	52' 12"
2	Rabobank-Liv Woman Cycling Team; Marianne Vos (NED); Thalita de Jong (NED); Annemiek van Vleuten (NED); Anna van der Breggen (NED)	+ 1' 21"
3	Boels–Dolmans; Ellen Van Dijk (NED); Lizzie Armitstead (GBR); Christine Majerus (LUX); Megan Guarnier (USA)	+ 2' 33"
4	Orica–AIS	+ 2' 51"
5	Bigla Cycling Team	+ 3' 54"
6	Estado de México–Faren Kuota	+ 4' 11"
7	Team Giant–Shimano	+ 4' 19"
8	RusVelo	+ 5' 05"
9	Team Hitec Products	+ 5' 22"
10	Team TIBCO – To The Top	+ 5' 45"

== World Cup standings ==
Standings after 8 of 9 2014 UCI Women's Road World Cup races.

=== Individuals ===
	Cyclist	Team	World Cup points
1	Lizzie Armitstead (GBR)	Boels–Dolmans	445
2	Emma Johansson (SWE)	Orica–AIS	315
3	Anna van der Breggen (NED)	Rabobank-Liv Woman Cycling Team	268
4	Ellen van Dijk (NED)	Boels–Dolmans	265
5	Kirsten Wild (NED)	Team Giant–Shimano	230
6	Giorgia Bronzini (ITA)	Wiggle–Honda	225
7	Elisa Longo Borghini (ITA)	Hitec Products	215
8	Marianne Vos (NED)	Rabobank-Liv Woman Cycling Team	200
9	Pauline Ferrand-Prévot (FRA)	Rabobank-Liv Woman Cycling Team	200
10	Elena Cecchini (ITA)	Estado de Mexico Faren	170

Team: Rabobank-Liv Woman Cycling Team
Mountain: Alena Amialiusik
Sprint: Iris Slappendel
Youth: Elena Cecchini
