= 2014 EPZ Omloop van Borsele =

Race details
- Dates: 26 April 2014
- Stages: 1
- Distance: 120 km (75 mi)
- Winning time: 2h 57' 43

Results
	Winner	Chloe Hosking (AUS)	(Hitec Products)
	Second	Kirsten Wild (NED)	(Team Giant–Shimano)
	Third	Ellen van Dijk (NED)	(Boels–Dolmans)

The 2014 EPZ Omloop van Borsele was the 12th running of the Omloop van Borsele, a women's cycling event in 's-Heerenhoek, the Netherlands. There was an individual time trial over 19.5 kilometres (12.1 miles) on 25 April – categorised as a national event – and a 1.2-category road race over 120 kilometres (74.6 miles) on 26 April 2014.

== Time trial ==
The individual time trial was held on 25 April over a distance of 19.5 kilometres (12.1 miles).

	Cyclist	Team	Time
1	Ellen van Dijk (NED)	Boels–Dolmans	26' 48.62"
2	Chantal Blaak (NED)	Specialized–lululemon	+ 8.74"
3	Tayler Wiles (USA)	Specialized–lululemon	+ 12.68"
4	Lisa Brennauer (GER)	Specialized–lululemon	+ 12.88"
5	Anna van der Breggen (NED)	Rabobank-Liv Woman Cycling Team	+ 17.48"
6	Shara Gillow (USA)	Orica–AIS	+ 34.28"
7	Roxane Knetemann (NED)	Rabobank-Liv Woman Cycling Team	+ 35.79"
8	Karol-Ann Canuel (CAN)	Specialized–lululemon	+ 40.57"
9	Loes Gunnewijk (NED)	Orica–AIS	+ 45.13"
10	Annemiek van Vleuten (NED)	Rabobank-Liv Woman Cycling Team	+ 56.69"

== Road race ==
The road race was held on 26 April over a distance of 120 kilometres (74.6 miles).

	Cyclist	Team	Time
1	Chloe Hosking (AUS)	Hitec Products	2h 57' 43"
2	Kirsten Wild (NED)	Team Giant–Shimano	s.t.
3	Ellen van Dijk (NED)	Boels–Dolmans	s.t.
4	Leah Kirchmann (CAN)	Optum–Kelly Benefit Strategies	s.t.
5	Martina Zwick (GER)	Bigla Cycling Team	s.t.
6	Pauline Ferrand-Prévot (FRA)	Rabobank-Liv Woman Cycling Team	s.t.
7	Gracie Elvin (AUS)	Orica–AIS	s.t.
8	Rossella Ratto (ITA)	Estado de México–Faren Kuota	s.t.
9	Nina Kessler (NED)	Boels–Dolmans	s.t.
10	Annemiek van Vleuten (NED)	Rabobank-Liv Woman Cycling Team	s.t.

== See also ==
- 2014 in women's road cycling
