= 2014 Durango-Durango Emakumeen Saria =

Race details
- Dates: 10 June 2014
- Stages: 1
- Distance: 110 km (68 mi)
- Winning time: 2h 52' 50"

Results
	Winner	Marianne Vos (NED)	(Rabobank-Liv Woman Cycling Team)
	Second	Lizzie Armitstead (GBR)	(Boels–Dolmans)
	Third	Emma Johansson (SWE)	(Orica–AIS)

The 2014 Durango-Durango Emakumeen Saria was the thirteenth running of the Durango-Durango Emakumeen Saria, a women's bicycle race in Spain. It was held on 10 June over a distance of 110 kilometres (68.4 miles). It was rated by the UCI as a 1.2 category race.

== Results ==
	Cyclist	Team	Time
1	Marianne Vos (NED)	Rabobank-Liv Woman Cycling Team	2h 52' 50"
2	Lizzie Armitstead (GBR)	Boels–Dolmans	s.t.
3	Emma Johansson (SWE)	Orica–AIS	s.t.
4	Anna van der Breggen (NED)	Hitec Products–UCK	+ 17"
5	Elisa Longo Borghini (ITA)	Hitec Products	+ 19"
6	Annemiek van Vleuten (NED)	Rabobank-Liv Woman Cycling Team	+ 27"
7	Katarzyna Pawłowska (POL)	Boels–Dolmans	+ 28"
8	Ashleigh Moolman (RSA)	Hitec Products	+ 28"
9	Trixi Worrack (GER)	Specialized–lululemon	+ 28"
10	Rossella Ratto (ITA)	Estado de México–Faren Kuota	+ 28"
