= Brustad =

Brustad is a surname. Notable people with the surname include:

- Arne Brustad (1912–1987), Norwegian footballer
- Bjarne Brustad (1895–1978), Norwegian composer, violinist and violist
- Eline Gleditsch Brustad (born 1994), Norwegian racing cyclist
- Fredrik Brustad (born 1989), Norwegian footballer
- Georg Brustad (1892–1932), Norwegian gymnast
- Karsten Brustad (born 1959), Norwegian contemporary composer and guitarist
- Knut Brustad (born 1945), Norwegian middle-distance runner
- Sylvia Brustad (born 1966), Norwegian politician
