= 2014 Ronde van Overijssel =

Race details
- Dates: 2 May 2014
- Stages: 1
- Distance: 144 km (89 mi)
- Winning time: 3h 48' 30"

Results
	Winner	Lisa Brennauer (GER)	(Specialized–lululemon)
	Second	Kirsten Wild (NED)	(Team Giant–Shimano)
	Third	Nina Kessler (NED)	(Boels–Dolmans)

The 2014 Ronde van Overijssel was a one-day women's cycle race held in the Netherlands on 2 May 2014. The race had a UCI rating of 1.1.

== Results ==
	Rider	Team	Time
1	Lisa Brennauer (GER)	Specialized–lululemon	3h 48' 30"
2	Kirsten Wild (NED)	Team Giant–Shimano	+ 12"
3	Nina Kessler (NED)	Boels–Dolmans	+ 12"
4	Elise Delsenne (FRA)	Specialized–lululemon	+ 12"
5	Natalie van Gogh (NED)	Parkhotel Valkenburg	+ 12"
6	Annemiek van Vleuten (NED)	Rabobank-Liv Woman Cycling Team	+ 12"
7	Chantal Blaak (NED)	Boels–Dolmans	+ 12"
8	Iris Slappendel (NED)	Rabobank-Liv Woman Cycling Team	+ 12"
9	Romy Kasper (GER)	Boels–Dolmans	+ 12"
10	Karol-Ann Canuel (CAN)	Specialized–lululemon	+ 12"

== See also ==
- 2014 in women's road cycling
