= 2014 Trofeo Alfredo Binda-Comune di Cittiglio =

2014 UCI Women's Road World Cup, race 2 of 9

Race details
- Dates: 15 March 2014
- Stages: 1
- Distance: 121.4 km (75.4 mi)
- Winning time: 3h 05' 24"

Results
	Winner	Emma Johansson (SWE)	(Orica–AIS)
	Second	Lizzie Armitstead (GBR)	(Boels–Dolmans)
	Third	Alena Amialiusik (BLR)	(Astana BePink)

The 2014 Trofeo Alfredo Binda-Comune di Cittiglio was the 39th running of the women's Trofeo Alfredo Binda-Comune di Cittiglio, a women's bicycle race in Italy. It was the second race of the 2014 UCI Women's Road World Cup season and was held on 30 March 2014 over a distance of 121.4 kilometres (75.4 miles), starting and finishing in Cittiglio.

The race was won by Swedish rider Emma Johansson of Orica–AIS in a sprint finish.

== Results ==
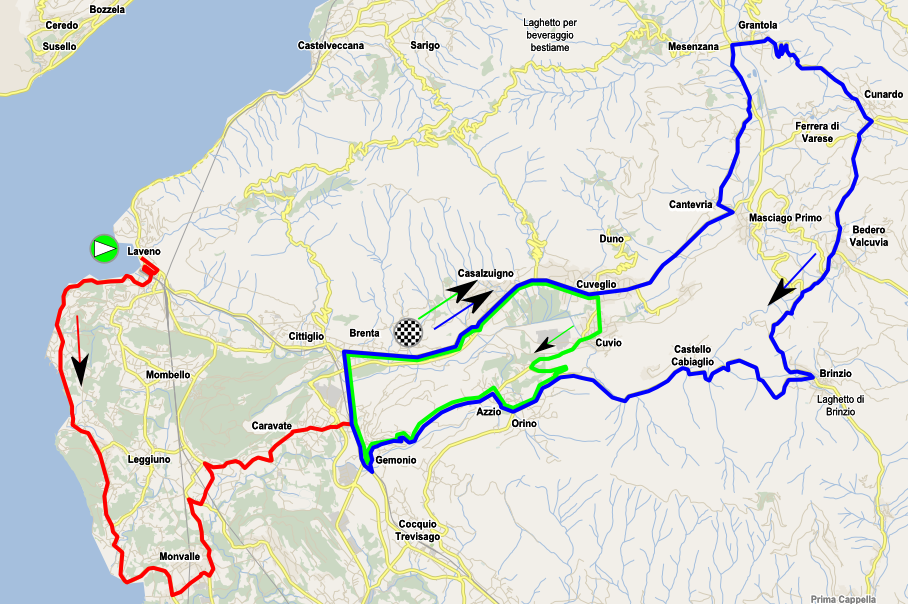
Map of the Trofeo Alfredo Binda-Comune di Cittiglio 2014. Start (red), long circuit made once (blue), short circuit made four times (green)

	Cyclist	Team	Time
1	Emma Johansson (SWE)	Orica–AIS	3h 05' 24"
2	Lizzie Armitstead (GBR)	Boels–Dolmans	s.t.
3	Alena Amialiusik (BLR)	Astana BePink	s.t.
4	Anna van der Breggen (NED)	Rabobank-Liv Woman Cycling Team	s.t.
5	Pauline Ferrand-Prévot (FRA)	Rabobank-Liv Woman Cycling Team	s.t.
6	Elisa Longo Borghini (ITA)	Hitec Products	s.t.
7	Olga Zabelinskaya (RUS)	RusVelo	s.t.
8	Ellen van Dijk (NED)	Boels–Dolmans	s.t.
9	Giorgia Bronzini (ITA)	Wiggle–Honda	+ 49"
10	Elena Cecchini (ITA)	Estado de México–Faren Kuota	+ 49"
