= Rossella Ratto =

Italian cyclist (born 1993)

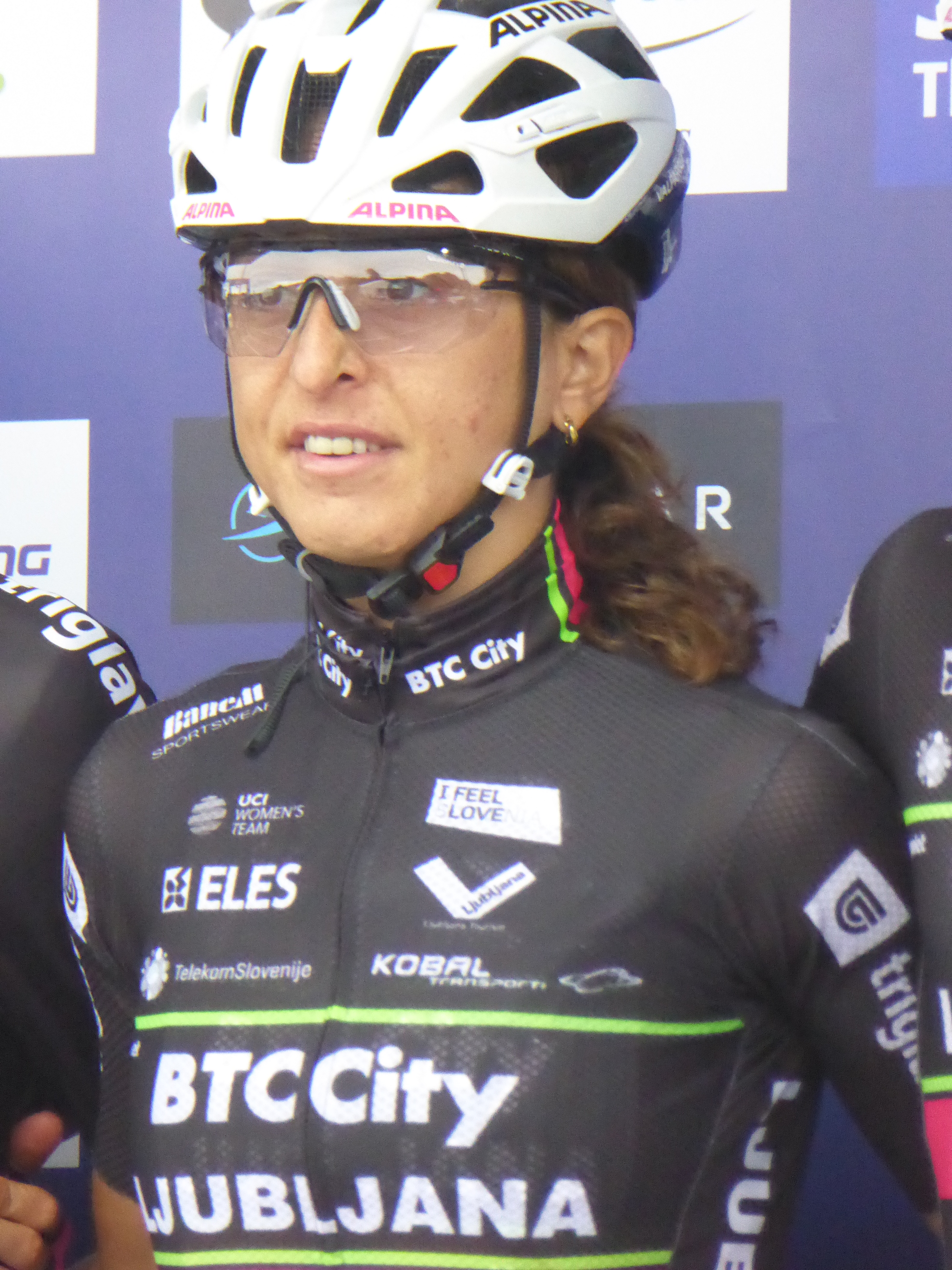
- Ratto at the 2019 Women's Tour of Scotland

Personal information
- Full name: Rossella Ratto
- Born: 20 October 1993 (age 32) Moncalieri, Italy

Cycling career
- Sport: Cycling
- Current team: Retired
- Discipline: Road
- Role: Rider

Amateur team
- Gruppo Sportivo Fiamme Azzurre

Professional teams
- 2012: Verinlegno–Fabiani
- 2013: Team Hitec Products
- 2014: Estado de México–Faren Kuota
- 2015: Inpa Sottoli Giusfredi
- 2016–2018: Cylance Pro Cycling
- 2019: BTC City Ljubljana
- 2020–2021: Chevalmeire Cycling Team
Medal record
Representing Italy
Women's road cycling
World Championship
Bronze medal – third place	2013 Tuscany	Road race

Rossella Ratto (born 20 October 1993) is an Italian former racing cyclist, who rode professionally between 2012 and 2021 for seven different teams.

During her professional career, Ratto took three victories – the 2014 Giro dell'Emilia Internazionale Donne Elite and 2016 Winston-Salem Cycling Classic one-day races, and a stage of The Women's Tour in 2014 – as well as winning a bronze medal in the road race at the 2013 UCI Road World Championships in Italy.

== Personal life ==
Ratto's brother, Daniele Ratto, also competed professionally in cycling, including winning the fourteenth stage of the 2013 Vuelta a España.

== Major results ==
2008
2nd Time trial, National Novice Road Championships
2009
1st Time trial, National Novice Road Championships
2010
2nd Road race, UCI Juniors Road World Championships
2nd Memorial Davide Fardelli Chrono
3rd Road race, UEC European Junior Road Championships
National Junior Road Championships

3rd Road race
3rd Time trial

2011
UEC European Junior Road Championships

1st Road race
1st Time trial

3rd Memorial Davide Fardelli Chrono
2012
5th Overall Giro del Trentino Alto Adige-Südtirol
6th Road race, UCI Road World Championships
6th Grand Prix El Salvador
7th Overall Vuelta a El Salvador
7th Overall Giro della Toscana Int. Femminile – Memorial Michela Fanini

1st Young rider classification

8th Grand Prix GSB
2013
UEC European Under-23 Road Championships

2nd Time trial
4th Road race

3rd Road race, UCI Road World Championships
3rd Road race, National Road Championships
4th Overall Tour Cycliste Féminin International de l'Ardèche
7th Holland Hills Classic
8th Overall Belgium Tour
8th Trofeo Alfredo Binda-Comune di Cittiglio
8th Gooik–Geraardsbergen–Gooik
8th Durango-Durango Emakumeen Saria
8th Open de Suède Vårgårda
10th Overall Giro del Trentino Alto Adige-Südtirol

1st Mountains classification

10th GP de Plouay
2014
1st Giro dell'Emilia Internazionale Donne Elite
3rd Overall The Women's Tour

1st Young rider classification
1st Stage 2

3rd Giro del Trentino Alto Adige-Südtirol
4th Overall Auensteiner-Radsporttage

1st Mountains classification
1st Young rider classification

4th Overall Ladies Tour of Norway
4th Overall Tour Cycliste Féminin International de l'Ardèche

1st Mountains classification

4th GP de Plouay
UEC European Under-23 Road Championships

8th Time trial
10th Road race

8th EPZ Omloop van Borsele
10th Durango-Durango Emakumeen Saria
2015
3rd Overall Tour Cycliste Féminin International de l'Ardèche

1st Young rider classification

5th Road race, European Games
2016
1st Winston-Salem Cycling Classic
7th Durango-Durango Emakumeen Saria
2017
3rd Giro dell'Emilia Internazionale Donne Elite
2018
3rd Time trial, National Road Championships
10th Liège–Bastogne–Liège
