= 2014 Ronde van Drenthe World Cup =

2014 UCI Women's Road World Cup, race 1 of 9

Race details
- Dates: 15 March 2014
- Stages: 1
- Distance: 132.8 km (82.5 mi)
- Winning time: 3h 51' 03"

Results
	Winner	Lizzie Armitstead (Great Britain)	(Boels–Dolmans)
	Second	Anna van der Breggen (Netherlands)	(Rabobank-Liv Woman Cycling Team)
	Third	Shelley Olds (United States)	(Alé–Cipollini)

UCI Report

The 2014 Ronde van Drenthe World Cup was the 8th running of the women's Ronde van Drenthe World Cup, a women's bicycle race in the Netherlands. It was the first World Cup race of the 2014 UCI Women's Road World Cup and was held on 15 March 2014 over a distance of 132.8 kilometres (82.5 miles), starting and finishing in Hoogeveen.

In the final of the race Anna van der Breggen and Iris Slappendel rode away from the chasing group. 16 km before the finish, after riding the VAM mountain for the last time, Van der Breggen rode away from Slappendel. Van der Breggen got an advantage of over 1' 30" on the chasing group. It was the Dutch Ellen van Dijk from Boels–Dolmans Cycling Team who closed about the whole gap and launched teammate Lizzie Armitstead, who rode to Van der Breggen. Armitstead outsprinted Van der Breggen in the final and won the race. Armitstead said after the race that it was her best achievement after winning silver at the 2012 Summer Olympics and thanked Van Dijk for chasing down Van der Breggen.

== Results ==
	Cyclist	Team	Time
1	Lizzie Armitstead (GBR)	Boels–Dolmans	3h 51' 03"
2	Anna van der Breggen (NED)	Rabobank-Liv Woman Cycling Team	+ 2"
3	Shelley Olds (USA)	Alé–Cipollini	+ 29"
4	Chantal Blaak (NED)	Specialized–lululemon	+ 29"
5	Annemiek van Vleuten (NED)	Rabobank-Liv Woman Cycling Team	+ 29"
6	Kirsten Wild (NED)	Giant–Shimano	+ 29"
7	Ellen van Dijk (NED)	Boels–Dolmans	+ 31"
8	Emma Johansson (SWE)	Orica–AIS	+ 31"
9	Amy Pieters (NED)	Giant–Shimano	+ 33"
10	Iris Slappendel (NED)	Rabobank-Liv Woman Cycling Team	+ 1' 36"
