= 2014 Tour of Flanders for Women =

2014 Tour of Flanders
2014 UCI Women's Road World Cup, race 3 of 9
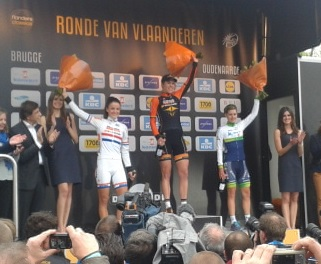
- The podium (from left to right): Lizzie Armitstead, Ellen van Dijk and Emma Johansson.

Race details
- Dates: 6 April 2014
- Stages: 1
- Distance: 139 km (86 mi)
- Winning time: 3h 47' 50"

Results
	Winner	Ellen van Dijk (NED)	(Boels–Dolmans)
	Second	Lizzie Armitstead (GBR)	(Boels–Dolmans)
	Third	Emma Johansson (SWE)	(Orica–AIS)

The 2014 Tour of Flanders for Women was the 11th running of the women's Tour of Flanders for Women, a women's bicycle race in Belgium. It was the third race of the 2014 UCI Women's Road World Cup season and was held on 6 April 2014 over a distance of 139 kilometres (86.4 miles), starting and finishing in Oudenaarde.

With about 27 km to go Ellen van Dijk attacked on the Kruisberg and built an advantage of more than a minute by the time she finished. A number of riders tried to catch her, including Tiffany Cromwell (Specialized–lululemon) and compatriot Lucinda Brand (Rabo–Liv). Behind Van Dijk her Boels–Dolmans Cycling Team teammate Lizzie Armitstead won the sprint of the chasing group ahead of Emma Johansson.

== Race report ==
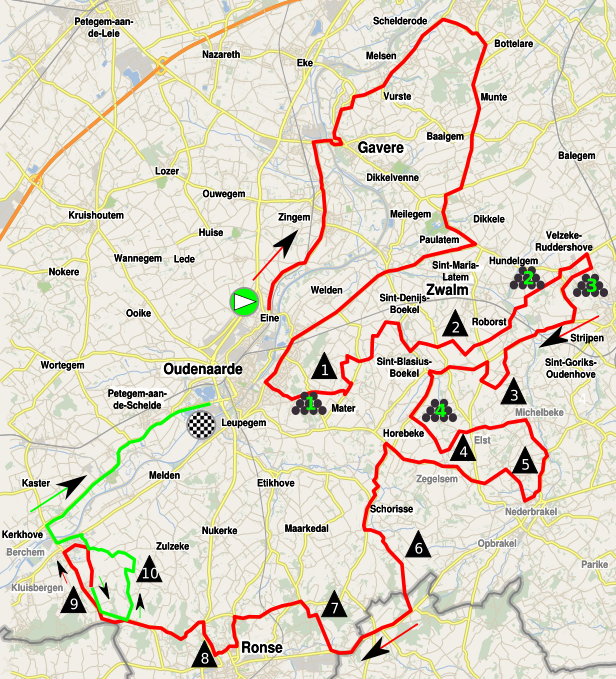
Map of the Tour of Flanders for Women 2014. Final in green.

Although there were a number of attacks during the 139.6 km race, the women's field stayed largely together, at least at the front of the race. The first hour saw numerous crashes, sending riders such as Amanda Spratt (Orica–AIS) and Rikke Lønne of Team Rytger to the hospital as rain and nerves made the racing dangerous. Gracie Elvin (Orica–AIS) and Valentina Carretta (Alé-Cipollini) had a go, but could not gain even half a minute on the field, and while Carretta tried again with Lucinda Brand (Rabo–Liv), as the race hit the critical final kilometers the peloton was still intact. The decisive moment came when Ellen van Dijk attacked with 27 kilometres to go, just before Kruisberg. She used her time trialling skills to keep the chasers at bay. Specialized–lululemon's Tiffany Cromwell tried to go across, but was caught by the chase on the Oude Kwaremont. With only one climb to go, the Paterberg, Van Dijk's lead grew to 38 seconds. As Van Dijk continued to build her lead, Emma Johansson, Elisa Longo Borghini and Van Dijk's teammate Lizzie Armitstead, left the field behind but were never able to close on the powerful Dutch rider. Once the Paterberg was behind her, Van Dijk made easy work of the final 13 km to the line. The reigning world time trial champion hit a speed of 55 km/h as she powered to her first victory of the year and had built up an advantage of more than a minute by the time she finished. Armitstead's second place is her third podium of the year, from three world cup races, and will keep hold of the lead in the competition. Behind Van Dijk her Boels–Dolmans Cycling Team mate Lizzie Armitstead won the sprint of the chasing group ahead of Emma Johansson.

== Reaction ==
Ellen van Dijk responded: "We came to the race with a super strong team today. I went, according to our plan, on the Kruisberg and kept it full blast. The old road, a hard climb with cobbles, is new to the race route and I knew that if I was strong I could make a gap there. After that I had to simply give it everything I had until the finish, a time trial to the line, and just hoping that it was enough. Lizzie was behind and I knew it would be really frustrating for Johansson and Longo Borghini that she would be able to finish off the work of the team, if they did manage to catch me. The way it turned out was really the ideal scenario. I came into form exactly at the right time to deliver this performance. Due to being sick in the winter, the spring campaign started slower than other years, but I kept feeling better and better every week. With this as an absolute peak. I'm unbelievably happy with it. If you've been so close so many times in the World Cup, it makes it so nice now I've won and great that it happened here in Flanders."

== Results ==
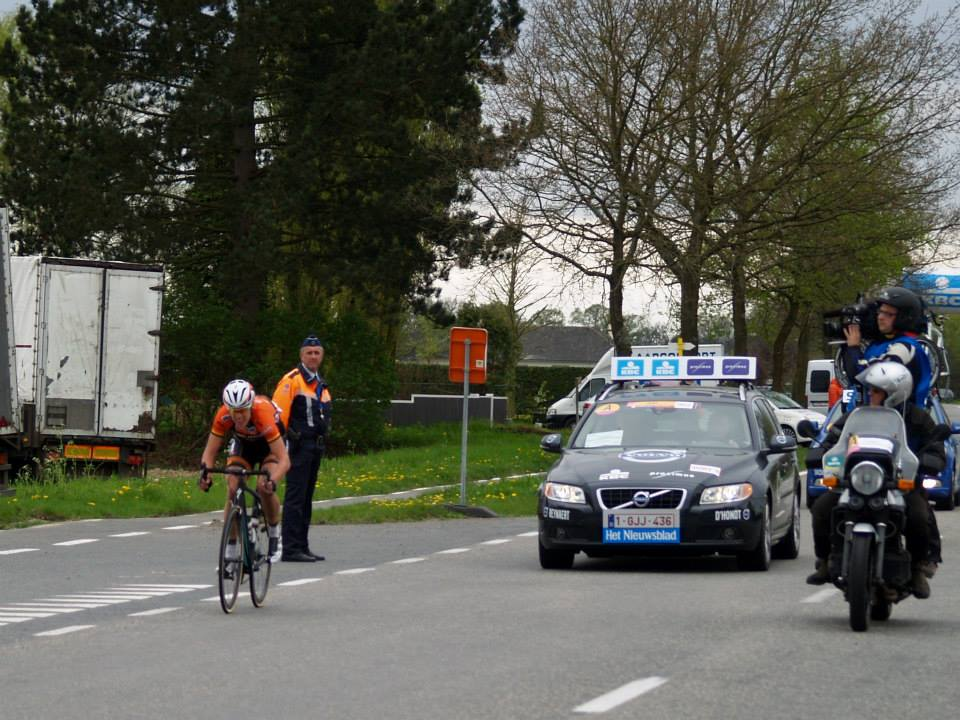
Ellen van Dijk riding solo to victory

Result
Rank	Rider	Team	Time
1	Ellen van Dijk (NED)	Boels–Dolmans	3h 47' 50"
2	Lizzie Armitstead (GBR)	Boels–Dolmans	+ 1' 01"
3	Emma Johansson (SWE)	Orica–AIS	+ 1' 01"
4	Elisa Longo Borghini (ITA)	Hitec Products	+ 1' 03"
5	Annemiek van Vleuten (NED)	Rabobank-Liv Woman Cycling Team	+ 1' 03"
6	Anna van der Breggen (NED)	Rabobank-Liv Woman Cycling Team	+ 1' 03"
7	Liesbet De Vocht (BEL)	Lotto–Belisol Ladies	+ 1' 03"
8	Megan Guarnier (USA)	Boels–Dolmans	+ 1' 03"
9	Tiffany Cromwell (AUS)	Specialized–lululemon	+ 1' 03"
10	Evelyn Stevens (USA)	Specialized–lululemon	+ 1' 03"

== World Cup standings ==
Standings after 3 of 9 2014 UCI Women's Road World Cup races.

Individual standings
Rank	Rider	Team	Points
1	Lizzie Armitstead (GBR)	Boels–Dolmans	320
2	Emma Johansson (SWE)	Orica–AIS	240
3	Anna van der Breggen (NED)	Rabobank-Liv Woman Cycling Team	220
4	Ellen van Dijk (NED)	Boels–Dolmans	195
5	Elisa Longo Borghini (ITA)	Hitec Products	130
6	Annemiek van Vleuten (NED)	Rabobank-Liv Woman Cycling Team	120
7	Alena Amialiusik (BLR)	Astana BePink	85
8	Shelley Olds (USA)	Alé Cipollini	85
9	Pauline Ferrand-Prévot (FRA)	Rabobank-Liv Woman Cycling Team	80
10	Chantal Blaak (NED)	Specialized–lululemon	70

Team: Boels–Dolmans Cycling Team
Mountain: Anna van der Breggen
Sprint: Iris Slappendel
Youth: Pauline Ferrand-Prévot
