= 2014 Giro del Trentino Alto Adige-Südtirol =

2014 GP du Canton d'Argovie
Race details
- Dates: 21 June 2013
- Stages: 1

The 2014 Giro del Trentino Alto Adige-Südtirol was the 21st running of the Giro del Trentino Alto Adige-Südtirol a women's bicycle race in Italy. Apart from the other editions, it was this year a one-day race instead of a stage race. It was held on 21 June over a distance of km. It was rated by the UCI as a 1.1 category race.

== Results ==
	Cyclist	Team	Time
1	Valentina Scandolara (ITA)	Orica–AIS	2h 45' 45"
2	Giorgia Bronzini (ITA)	Wiggle–Honda	+ 5"
3	Rossella Ratto (ITA)	Estado de México–Faren Kuota	+ 5"
4	Eugenia Bujak (POL)	BTC City Ljubljana	+ 5"
5	Susanna Zorzi (ITA)	Astana BePink	+ 5"
6	Tatiana Antoshina (RUS)	RusVelo	+ 5"
7	Sabrina Stultiens (NED)	Rabobank-Liv Woman Cycling Team	+ 28"
8	Katrin Garfoot (AUS)	Orica–AIS	+ 32"
9	Fabiana Luperini (ITA)	Estado de México–Faren Kuota	+ 32"
10	Carlee Taylor (AUS)	Orica–AIS	+ 32"
