= 2014 La Course by Le Tour de France =

- Logo of the 2014 edition

Race details
- Dates: 27 July 2014
- Stages: 1
- Distance: 89.0 km (55.3 mi)
- Winning time: 2h 00' 41"

Results
	Winner	Marianne Vos (NED)	(Rabo Liv)
	Second	Kirsten Wild (NED)	(Giant–Shimano)
	Third	Leah Kirchmann (CAN)	(Optum Kelly)
	Points	Marta Tagliaferro (ITA)	(Alé Cipollini)
	Youth	Coryn Rivera (USA)	(UnitedHealthcare)

The 2014 La Course by Le Tour de France was the inaugural edition of La Course by Le Tour de France, a women's cycling race held in France. The race was run before the 21st stage of the 2014 Tour de France on 27 July. The race was introduced following criticism by the professional women's peloton and campaigners such as Kathryn Bertine regarding the lack of a women's Tour de France.

The race was won by Marianne Vos of Rabo Liv in a sprint finish, with Kirsten Wild of Team Giant–Shimano finishing second and Leah Kirchmann of Optum p/b Kelly Benefit Strategies in third.

== Route and organisation ==
The race consisted of 13 laps on the traditional course on the Champs-Élysées in Paris, making a distance of 89 kilometres (55 miles). The race was organised by the ASO and rated by the UCI as a 1.1 category race.

=== Broadcasting ===
The race was covered in 157 countries by 25 TV broadcasters, 23 of which broadcast the last hour of the race live.

== Teams ==
UCI Women's Teams

- Alé Cipollini
- Astana BePink Women's Team
- Bigla Pro Cycling Team
- Bizkaia–Durango
- Boels–Dolmans
- Estado de México–Faren Kuota
- Team Hitec Products
- Lotto–Belisol Ladies
- Optum p/b Kelly Benefit Strategies
- Orica–AIS
- Poitou–Charentes.Futuroscope.86
- Rabobank–Liv Woman Cycling Team
- RusVelo
- Specialized–lululemon
- Team Giant–Shimano
- UnitedHealthcare
- Wiggle–Honda Pro Cycling

National teams

Australia
Netherlands
France

== The race ==
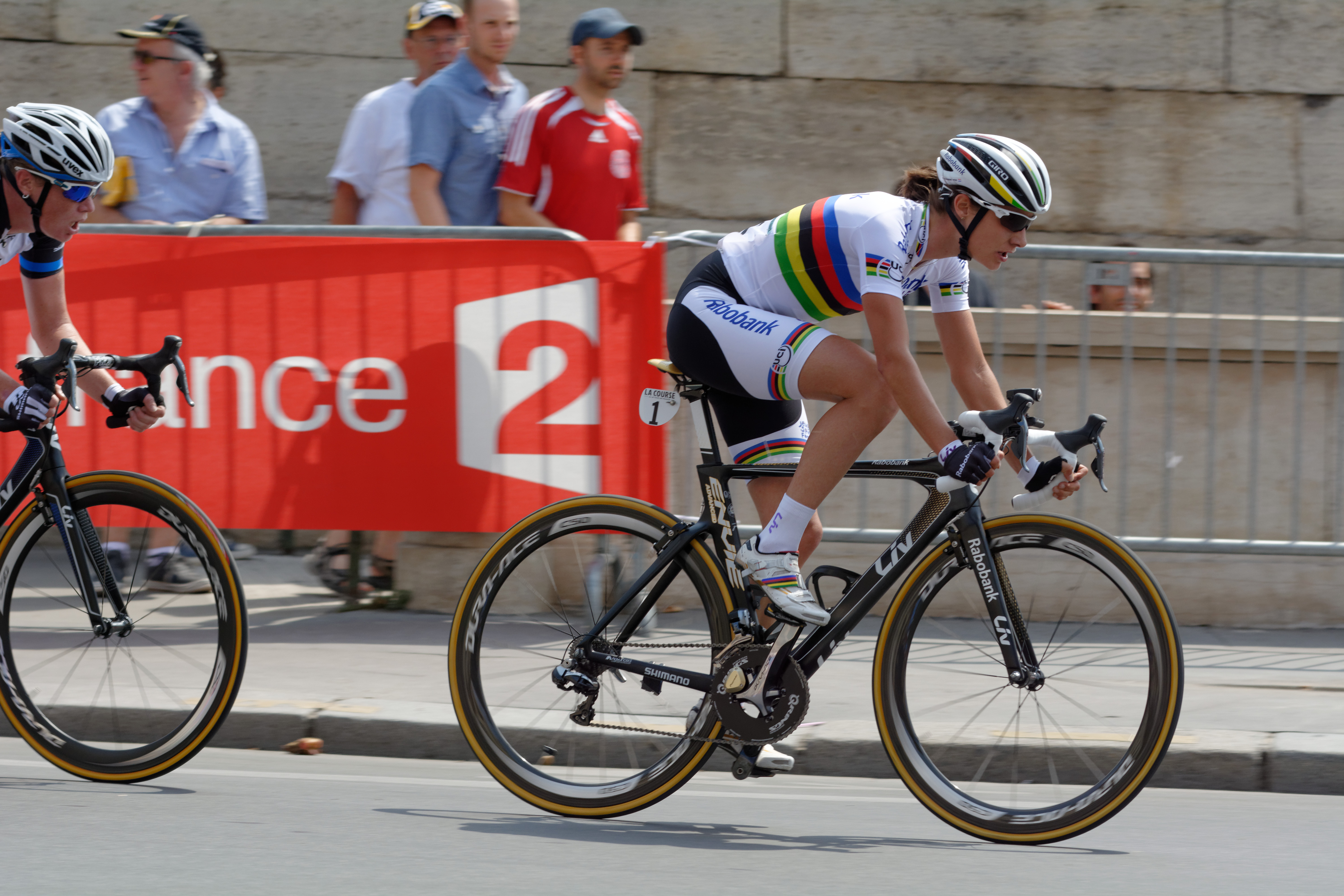
Marianne Vos, winner of La Course by Tour de France 2014

The race started at 11:45 Central European Summer Time (UTC+2), and was scheduled to last until 13:00. The race saw many attacks. Dutchwomen Ellen van Dijk (Boels–Dolmans), who attacked multiple times, was the only women who was able to get clear for a few laps with a maximal advantage of over half a minute. Besides of her also Anna van der Breggen, Annemiek van Vleuten (both Rabobank-Liv Woman Cycling Team), Amy Pieters (Team Giant–Shimano), Chantal Blaak (Specialized–lululemon), Alena Amialiusik (Astana BePink) and Rachel Neylan (Australia National team) attempted to ride away from the peloton, but none were successful. With a few kilometres to go the Mexican national champion Ana Teresa Casas (Estado de México–Faren Kuota) crashed out of the race, and with around a kilometre to go another crash in the bunch took down Lizzie Armitstead (Boels–Dolmans) and Pauline Ferrand-Prévot (Rabo–Liv). The race ended in a bunch sprint with a peloton of about 30 riders. Marianne Vos (Rabo–Liv) won the sprint ahead of Kirsten Wild (Team Giant–Shimano). Canada's Leah Kirchmann (Optum p/b Kelly Benefit Strategies) finished third in the sprint.

== Classifications ==
Besides the individual time classification (finishing time of the riders) there is a sprint and young rider classification. The Young rider classification exists of the individual time classification with riders born since 1 January 1992. The sprint classification is established by adding up the points obtained in each of the intermediate sprints. There were sprints after each of the first eleven laps, where 5, 4, 3, 2, and 1 point(s) were/was awarded to the top five riders.

Race result

	Cyclist	Team	Time
1	Marianne Vos (NED)	Rabobank-Liv Woman Cycling Team	2h 00' 41"
2	Kirsten Wild (NED)	Giant–Shimano	+ 0"
3	Leah Kirchmann (CAN)	Optum p/b Kelly Benefit Strategies	+ 0"
4	Lisa Brennauer (GER)	Specialized–lululemon	+ 0"
5	Shelley Olds (USA)	Alé Cipollini	+ 0"
6	Coryn Rivera (USA)	UnitedHealthcare Women's Team	+ 0"
7	Jolien D'Hoore (BEL)	Lotto Belisol Ladies	+ 0"
8	Emma Johansson (SWE)	Orica–AIS	+ 0"
9	Simona Frapporti (ITA)	Astana BePink Women's Team	+ 0"
10	Roxane Fournier (FRA)	Poitou–Charentes.Futuroscope.86	+ 0"

Sprint classification

	Rider	Team	Points
1	Marta Tagliaferro (ITA)	Alé Cipollini	32
2	Alena Amialiusik (BLR)	Astana BePink	25
3	Audrey Cordon (FRA)	Hitec Products	16
4	Ellen van Dijk (NED)	Boels–Dolmans	13
5	Chantal Blaak (NED)	Specialized–lululemon	8

Young rider classification

	Rider	Team	Time
1	Coryn Rivera (USA)	UnitedHealthcare Women's Team	2h 00' 41"

== Prize money ==
The total prize money of the race was €22,500: €17,500 was to be awarded to the best 20 riders of the individual time classification, €3,500 to the first 3 riders in the sprint classification and €2,000 to the first three riders of the young rider classification.

Position	1st	2nd	3rd	4th	5th	6th	7th	8th	9th	10th	11th – 20th	Total
Time classification	€6,000	€4,000	€2,000	€1,000	€800	€700	€600	€400	€300	€200	€100	€17,500
Sprint classification	€2,000	€1,000	€500	-	-	-	-	-	-	-	-	€3,500
Young rider classification	€1,000	€600	€400	-	-	-	-	-	-	-	-	€2,000

== See also ==
- 2014 in women's road cycling
