= 2014 La Flèche Wallonne Féminine =

2014 UCI Women's Road World Cup, race 4 of 9
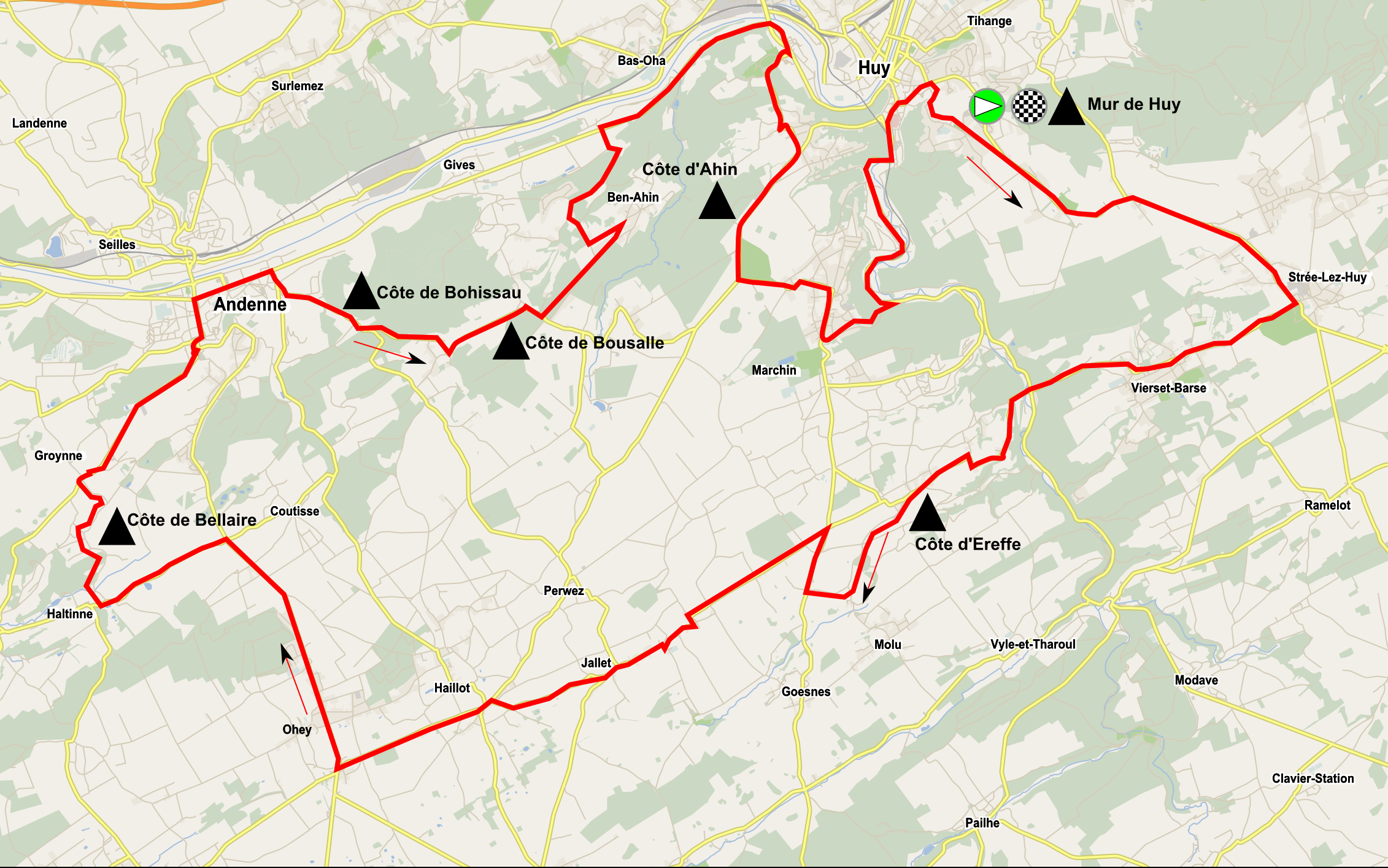

Race details
- Dates: 23 April 2014
- Stages: 1
- Distance: 127 km (79 mi)
- Winning time: 3h 26' 43"

Results
	Winner	Pauline Ferrand-Prévot (FRA)	(Rabobank-Liv Woman Cycling Team)
	Second	Lizzie Armitstead (GBR)	(Boels–Dolmans)
	Third	Elisa Longo Borghini (ITA)	(Hitec Products)

The 2014 La Flèche Wallonne Féminine was a women's bicycle race in Belgium. It was the fourth race of the 2014 UCI Women's Road World Cup season and was held on 23 April 2014 over a distance of 127 kilometres (78.9 miles), starting and finishing in Huy.

== Results ==
	Cyclist	Team	Time
1	Pauline Ferrand-Prévot (FRA)	Rabobank-Liv Woman Cycling Team	3h 26' 43"
2	Lizzie Armitstead (GBR)	Boels–Dolmans	+ 1"
3	Elisa Longo Borghini (ITA)	Hitec Products	+ 4"
4	Evelyn Stevens (USA)	Specialized–lululemon	+ 7"
5	Ashleigh Moolman (RSA)	Hitec Products	+ 11"
6	Marianne Vos (NED)	Rabobank-Liv Woman Cycling Team	+ 13"
7	Emma Pooley (GBR)	Lotto–Belisol Ladies	+ 13"
8	Linda Villumsen (NZL)	Wiggle–Honda	+ 21"
9	Claudia Häusler (GER)	Giant–Shimano	+ 24"
10	Ellen van Dijk (NED)	Boels–Dolmans	+ 28"

== World Cup standings ==
Standings after 4 of 9 2014 UCI Women's Road World Cup races.

=== Individuals ===
	Cyclist	Team	World Cup points
1	Lizzie Armitstead (GBR)	Boels–Dolmans	420
2	Emma Johansson (SWE)	Orica–AIS	260
3	Anna van der Breggen (NED)	Rabobank-Liv Woman Cycling Team	238
4	Ellen van Dijk (NED)	Boels–Dolmans	220
5	Elisa Longo Borghini (ITA)	Hitec Products	215
6	Pauline Ferrand-Prévot (FRA)	Rabobank-Liv Woman Cycling Team	200
7	Annemiek van Vleuten (NED)	Rabobank-Liv Woman Cycling Team	120
8	Evelyn Stevens (USA)	Specialized–lululemon	95
9	Alena Amialiusik (BLR)	Astana BePink	85
10	Shelley Olds (USA)	Alé Cipollini	85

Team: Boels–Dolmans Cycling Team
Mountain:
Sprint: Iris Slappendel
Youth: Pauline Ferrand-Prévot
