= 2014 Holland Hills Classic =

2014 Boels Rental Hills Classic
Race details
- Dates: 30 May 2014
- Stages: 1
- Distance: 128.4 km (79.8 mi)
- Winning time: 3h 36' 38"

Results
	Winner	Emma Johansson (SWE)	(Orica–AIS)
	Second	Ellen van Dijk (NED)	(Boels–Dolmans)
	Third	Amy Pieters (NED)	(Team Giant–Shimano)
Jersey awarded to the mountains classification winner	Mountains	Ellen van Dijk (NED)	(Boels–Dolmans)

The 2014 Boels Rental Hills Classic is a one-day women's cycle race held in the Netherlands, from Sittard to Berg en Terblijt over 128.4 km on 30 May 2014. The race had a UCI rating of 1.1.

== Results ==
	Rider	Team	Time
1	Emma Johansson (SWE)	Orica–AIS	3h 36' 38"
2	Ellen van Dijk (NED)	Boels–Dolmans	+ 3"
3	Amy Pieters (NED)	Team Giant–Shimano	+ 5"
4	Roxane Knetemann (NED)	Rabobank-Liv Woman Cycling Team	+ 44"
5	Katarzyna Pawłowska (POL)	Boels–Dolmans	+ 3' 03"
6	Sabrina Stultiens (NED)	Rabobank-Liv Woman Cycling Team	+ 3' 03"
7	Anna van der Breggen (NED)	Rabobank-Liv Woman Cycling Team	+ 5' 07"
8	Jessie Daams (BEL)	Boels–Dolmans	+ 5' 07"
9	Sofie De Vuyst (BEL)	Futurumshop.nl–Zannata	+ 5' 07"
10	Ashleigh Moolman (RSA)	Hitec Products	+ 5' 07"

== See also ==
- 2014 in women's road cycling
