= 2014 The Women's Tour =

- Logo of 2014 The Women's Tour

Race details
- Dates: 7–11 May
- Stages: 5
- Distance: 498.9 km (310.0 mi)
- Winning time: 12h 42' 07"

Results
Jersey awarded to the overall winner	Winner	Marianne Vos (NED)	(Rabobank-Liv Woman Cycling Team)
	Second	Emma Johansson (SWE)	(Orica–AIS)
	Third	Rossella Ratto (ITA)	(Estado de México–Faren Kuota)
Jersey awarded to the points classification winner	Points	Marianne Vos (NED)	(Rabobank-Liv Woman Cycling Team)
Jersey awarded to the mountains classification winner	Mountains	Sharon Laws (GBR)	(UnitedHealthcare)
Jersey awarded to the youth classification winner	Youth	Rossella Ratto (ITA)	(Estado de México–Faren Kuota)
	Team	Optum–Kelly Benefit Strategies	

The 2014 Friends Life Women's Tour was the inaugural edition of The Women's Tour, a stage race held in Great Britain, with a UCI rating of 2.1. It was the ninth stage race of the 2014 Women's Elite cycling calendar. It is the only race in Great Britain, apart from the National Championships, on this calendar.

The race was won by Dutch rider Marianne Vos of Rabobank-Liv Woman Cycling Team, with Vos winning three of the five stages as well as the points classification.

== Teams ==
UCI Women's teams

Astana BePink
Boels–Dolmans
Estado de México–Faren Kuota
Hitec Products
Lotto–Belisol Ladies
Optum–Kelly Benefit Strategies
Orica–AIS
Rabobank-Liv Woman Cycling Team
Specialized–lululemon
UnitedHealthcare
Wiggle–Honda
Lointek

Non-UCI women's teams
Matrix Fitness-Vulpine

National teams
United Kingdom
Netherlands
Switzerland

== Stages ==
=== Stage 1 ===
7 May 2014 — Oundle to Northampton, 93.8 km (58.3 mi)

Stage 1 result

	Rider	Team	Time
1	Emma Johansson (SWE)	Orica–AIS	2h 28' 29"
2	Marianne Vos (NED)	Rabobank-Liv Woman Cycling Team	s.t.
3	Hannah Barnes (GBR)	UnitedHealthcare	s.t.
4	Trixi Worrack (GER)	Specialized–lululemon	s.t.
5	Giorgia Bronzini (ITA)	Wiggle–Honda	s.t.
6	Lucy Garner (GBR)	Great Britain (national team)	s.t.
7	Elena Cecchini (ITA)	Estado de México–Faren Kuota	s.t.
8	Lizzie Armitstead (GBR)	Boels–Dolmans	s.t.
9	Amy Pieters (NED)	Netherlands (national team)	s.t.
10	Tiffany Cromwell (AUS)	Specialized–lululemon	s.t.

General Classification after Stage 1

	Rider	Team	Time
1	Emma Johansson (SWE)	Orica–AIS	2h 28' 17"
2	Marianne Vos (NED)	Rabobank-Liv Woman Cycling Team	+ 4"
3	Hannah Barnes (GBR)	UnitedHealthcare	+ 8"
4	Ellen van Dijk (NED)	Boels–Dolmans	+ 9"
5	Élise Delzenne (FRA)	Specialized–lululemon	+ 9"
6	Lizzie Armitstead (GBR)	Boels–Dolmans	+ 10"
7	Trixi Worrack (GER)	Specialized–lululemon	+ 12"
8	Giorgia Bronzini (ITA)	Wiggle–Honda	+ 12"
9	Lucy Garner (GBR)	Great Britain (national team)	+ 12"
10	Elena Cecchini (ITA)	Estado de México–Faren Kuota	+ 12"

=== Stage 2 ===
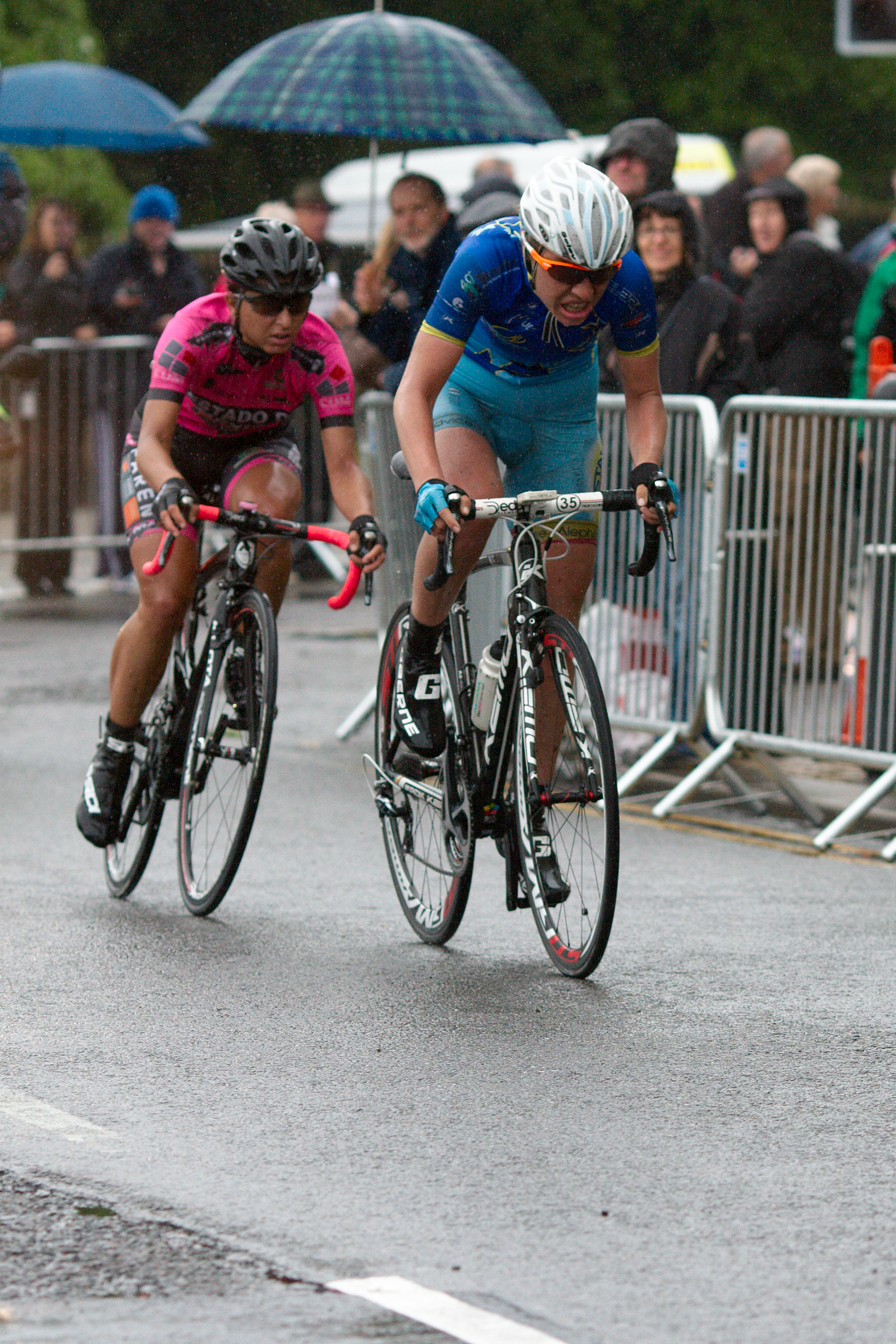
Susanna Zorzi leading Rossella Ratto out of the final turn during stage two. Ratto won the stage to assume the overall lead of the race.

8 May 2014 — Hinckley to Bedford, 118.5 km (73.6 mi)

Stage 2 result

	Rider	Team	Time
1	Rossella Ratto (ITA)	Estado de México–Faren Kuota	3h 02' 02"
2	Susanna Zorzi (ITA)	Astana BePink	s.t.
3	Marianne Vos (NED)	Rabobank-Liv Woman Cycling Team	+ 6"
4	Amy Pieters (NED)	Netherlands (national team)	+ 6"
5	Lucy Garner (GBR)	Great Britain (national team)	+ 6"
6	Giorgia Bronzini (ITA)	Wiggle–Honda	+ 6"
7	Lizzie Armitstead (GBR)	Boels–Dolmans	+ 6"
8	Aurore Verhoeven (FRA)	Lointek	+ 6"
9	Aude Biannic (FRA)	Lointek	+ 6"
10	Chloe Hosking (AUS)	Hitec Products	+ 6"

General Classification after Stage 2

	Rider	Team	Time
1	Rossella Ratto (ITA)	Estado de México–Faren Kuota	5h 30' 18"
2	Susanna Zorzi (ITA)	Astana BePink	+ 5"
3	Marianne Vos (NED)	Rabobank-Liv Woman Cycling Team	+ 6"
4	Emma Johansson (SWE)	Orica–AIS	+ 7"
5	Lizzie Armitstead (GBR)	Boels–Dolmans	+ 14"
6	Hannah Barnes (GBR)	UnitedHealthcare	+ 15"
7	Ellen van Dijk (NED)	Boels–Dolmans	+ 16"
8	Élise Delzenne (FRA)	Specialized–lululemon	+ 16"
9	Silvia Valsecchi (ITA)	Astana BePink	+ 16"
10	Lucy Garner (GBR)	Great Britain (national team)	+ 19"

=== Stage 3 ===
9 May 2014 — Felixstowe to Clacton-on-Sea, 90.5 km (56.2 mi)

Stage 3 result

	Rider	Team	Time
1	Marianne Vos (NED)	Rabobank-Liv Woman Cycling Team	2h 11' 05"
2	Emma Johansson (SWE)	Orica–AIS	s.t.
3	Giorgia Bronzini (ITA)	Wiggle–Honda	s.t.
4	Lizzie Armitstead (GBR)	Boels–Dolmans	s.t.
5	Elena Cecchini (ITA)	Estado de México–Faren Kuota	s.t.
6	Leah Kirchmann (CAN)	Optum–Kelly Benefit Strategies	s.t.
7	Amy Pieters (NED)	Netherlands (national team)	s.t.
8	Lucy Garner (GBR)	Great Britain (national team)	s.t.
9	Ellen van Dijk (NED)	Boels–Dolmans	s.t.
10	Chloe Hosking (AUS)	Hitec Products	s.t.

General Classification after Stage 3

	Rider	Team	Time
1	Marianne Vos (NED)	Rabobank-Liv Woman Cycling Team	7h 41' 14"
2	Emma Johansson (SWE)	Orica–AIS	+ 8"
3	Rossella Ratto (ITA)	Estado de México–Faren Kuota	+ 9"
4	Susanna Zorzi (ITA)	Astana BePink	+ 14"
5	Lizzie Armitstead (GBR)	Boels–Dolmans	+ 18"
6	Giorgia Bronzini (ITA)	Wiggle–Honda	+ 24"
7	Hannah Barnes (GBR)	UnitedHealthcare	+ 24"
8	Ellen van Dijk (NED)	Boels–Dolmans	+ 25"
9	Élise Delzenne (FRA)	Specialized–lululemon	+ 25"
10	Lucy Garner (GBR)	Great Britain (national team)	+ 28"

=== Stage 4 ===
10 May 2014 — Cheshunt to Welwyn Garden City, 87.8 km (54.6 mi)

Stage 4 result

	Rider	Team	Time
1	Marianne Vos (NED)	Rabobank-Liv Woman Cycling Team	2h 13' 09"
2	Giorgia Bronzini (ITA)	Wiggle–Honda	s.t.
3	Lucy Garner (GBR)	Great Britain (national team)	s.t.
4	Emma Johansson (SWE)	Orica–AIS	s.t.
5	Elena Cecchini (ITA)	Estado de México–Faren Kuota	s.t.
6	Lauren Hall (USA)	Optum–Kelly Benefit Strategies	s.t.
7	Leah Kirchmann (CAN)	Optum–Kelly Benefit Strategies	s.t.
8	Aude Biannic (FRA)	Lointek	s.t.
9	Trixi Worrack (GER)	Specialized–lululemon	s.t.
10	Lizzie Armitstead (GBR)	Boels–Dolmans	s.t.

General Classification after Stage 4

	Rider	Team	Time
1	Marianne Vos (NED)	Rabobank-Liv Woman Cycling Team	9h 54' 10"
2	Emma Johansson (SWE)	Orica–AIS	+ 19"
3	Rossella Ratto (ITA)	Estado de México–Faren Kuota	+ 22"
4	Lizzie Armitstead (GBR)	Boels–Dolmans	+ 30"
5	Giorgia Bronzini (ITA)	Wiggle–Honda	+ 31"
6	Susanna Zorzi (ITA)	Astana BePink	+ 31"
7	Lucy Garner (GBR)	Great Britain (national team)	+ 37"
8	Hannah Barnes (GBR)	UnitedHealthcare	+ 37"
9	Elena Cecchini (ITA)	Estado de México–Faren Kuota	+ 41"
10	Amy Pieters (NED)	Netherlands (national team)	+ 41"

=== Stage 5 ===
11 May 2014 — Harwich to Bury St Edmunds, 108.3 km (67.3 mi)

Stage 5 result

	Rider	Team	Time
1	Marianne Vos (NED)	Rabobank-Liv Woman Cycling Team	2h 48' 10"
2	Giorgia Bronzini (ITA)	Wiggle–Honda	s.t.
3	Amy Pieters (NED)	Netherlands (national team)	s.t.
4	Hannah Barnes (GBR)	UnitedHealthcare	s.t.
5	Emma Johansson (SWE)	Orica–AIS	s.t.
6	Elena Cecchini (ITA)	Estado de México–Faren Kuota	s.t.
7	Chloe Hosking (AUS)	Hitec Products	s.t.
8	Aude Biannic (FRA)	Lointek	s.t.
9	Élise Delzenne (FRA)	Specialized–lululemon	s.t.
10	Leah Kirchmann (CAN)	Optum–Kelly Benefit Strategies	s.t.

Final General Classification

	Rider	Team	Time
1	Marianne Vos (NED)	Rabobank-Liv Woman Cycling Team	12h 42' 07"
2	Emma Johansson (SWE)	Orica–AIS	+ 30"
3	Rossella Ratto (ITA)	Estado de México–Faren Kuota	+ 35"
4	Giorgia Bronzini (ITA)	Wiggle–Honda	+ 38"
5	Susanna Zorzi (ITA)	Astana BePink	+ 44"
6	Amy Pieters (NED)	Netherlands (national team)	+ 50"
7	Lucy Garner (GBR)	Great Britain (national team)	+ 50"
8	Hannah Barnes (GBR)	UnitedHealthcare	+ 50"
9	Lauren Hall (USA)	Optum–Kelly Benefit Strategies	+ 52"
10	Elena Cecchini (ITA)	Estado de México–Faren Kuota	+ 54"

== Classification leadership table ==
The yellow jersey is awarded to the rider with the lowest overall accumulated time.
The points jersey is awarded to the rider with the most points accrued from stage finishes, and intermediate sprints on each stage.
The Queen of the Mountains jersey is awarded to the rider with the most points accrued from the summits of designated climbs on each stage.
The best young rider jersey is awarded to the rider with the lowest accumulated time who is under 23 years of age.
The best British rider jersey is awarded to the leading British rider on general classification.

Stage	Winner	General classification	Points classification	Mountains classification	Young rider classification	Best British rider	Teams classification
1	Emma Johansson	Emma Johansson	Emma Johansson	Sharon Laws	Hannah Barnes	Hannah Barnes	Specialized–lululemon
2	Rossella Ratto	Rossella Ratto	Marianne Vos	Sharon Laws	Rossella Ratto	Lizzie Armitstead	Astana BePink
3	Marianne Vos	Marianne Vos	Marianne Vos	Sharon Laws	Rossella Ratto	Lizzie Armitstead	Orica–AIS
4	Marianne Vos	Marianne Vos	Marianne Vos	Sharon Laws	Rossella Ratto	Lizzie Armitstead	Optum–Kelly Benefit Strategies
5	Marianne Vos	Marianne Vos	Marianne Vos	Sharon Laws	Rossella Ratto	Lucy Garner	Optum–Kelly Benefit Strategies
Final		Marianne Vos	Marianne Vos	Sharon Laws	Rossella Ratto	Lucy Garner	Optum–Kelly Benefit Strategies
