= 2014 UCI Women's Road World Cup =

Series of bicycle races

- Seventeenth edition of the UCI Women's Road World Cup

Details
- Dates: 15 March – 30 August
- Location: Europe and China
- Races: 9

The 2014 UCI Women's Road World Cup is the 17th edition of the UCI Women's Road World Cup and part of the 2014 UCI women's calendar. One race was added compared to the 2013 edition: the German Giro Bochum. This race was already on the women's calendar since 2001 as 1.1 category race.

== Races ==
Round	Date	Race	Country	Winner	Second	Third
1	15 March	Ronde van Drenthe	Netherlands	Lizzie Armitstead (GBR)	Anna van der Breggen (NED)	Shelley Olds (USA)
2	30 March	Trofeo Alfredo Binda-Comune di Cittiglio	Italy	Emma Johansson (SWE)	Lizzie Armitstead (GBR)	Alena Amialiusik (BLR)
3	6 April	Tour of Flanders	Belgium	Ellen van Dijk (NED)	Lizzie Armitstead (GBR)	Emma Johansson (SWE)
4	23 April	La Flèche Wallonne Féminine	Belgium	Pauline Ferrand-Prévot (FRA)	Lizzie Armitstead (GBR)	Elisa Longo Borghini (ITA)
5	18 May	Tour of Chongming Island World Cup	China	Kirsten Wild (NED)	Elena Cecchini (ITA)	Giorgia Bronzini (ITA)
6	3 August	Sparkassen Giro	Germany	Marianne Vos (NED)	Giorgia Bronzini (ITA)	Lotta Lepistö (FIN)
7	22 August	Open de Suède Vårgårda TTT	Sweden	Specialized–lululemon; Trixi Worrack (GER); Evelyn Stevens (USA); Karol-Ann Canuel (CAN); Lisa Brennauer (GER); Chantal Blaak (NED)	Rabobank-Liv Woman Cycling Team; Marianne Vos (NED); Thalita de Jong (NED); Annemiek van Vleuten (NED); Anna van der Breggen (NED)	Boels–Dolmans; Lizzie Armitstead (GBR); Christine Majerus (LUX); Megan Guarnier (USA); Ellen Van Dijk (NED)
8	24 August	Open de Suède Vårgårda	Sweden	Chantal Blaak (NED)	Amy Pieters (NED)	Roxane Knetemann (NED)
9	30 August	GP de Plouay	France	Lucinda Brand (NED)	Marianne Vos (NED)	Pauline Ferrand-Prévot (FRA)

== Results ==
	Cyclist	Team	World Cup points
1	Lizzie Armitstead (GBR)	Boels–Dolmans	515
2	Emma Johansson (SWE)	Orica–AIS	390
3	Marianne Vos (NED)	Rabobank-Liv Woman Cycling Team	370
4	Anna van der Breggen (NED)	Rabobank-Liv Woman Cycling Team	346
5	Kirsten Wild (NED)	Team Giant–Shimano	290
6	Pauline Ferrand-Prévot (FRA)	Rabobank-Liv Woman Cycling Team	285
7	Ellen van Dijk (NED)	Boels–Dolmans	269
8	Elisa Longo Borghini (ITA)	Hitec Products	255
9	Chantal Blaak (NED)	Specialized–lululemon	225
10	Giorgia Bronzini (ITA)	Wiggle–Honda	225

== Leader progress ==
Event (Winner)	Individual	Team	Mountain	Sprint	Youth
Ronde van Drenthe (Lizzie Armitstead)	Lizzie Armitstead	Rabobank-Liv Woman Cycling Team	Amy Pieters	Iris Slappendel	Thalita de Jong
Trofeo Alfredo Binda-Comune di Cittiglio (Emma Johansson)	Lizzie Armitstead	Rabobank-Liv Woman Cycling Team	Alena Amialiusik	Iris Slappendel	Pauline Ferrand-Prévot
Tour of Flanders (Ellen van Dijk)	Lizzie Armitstead	Boels–Dolmans	Anna van der Breggen	Iris Slappendel	Pauline Ferrand-Prévot
La Flèche Wallonne Féminine (Pauline Ferrand-Prévot)	Lizzie Armitstead	Boels–Dolmans	Pauline Ferrand-Prévot	Iris Slappendel	Pauline Ferrand-Prévot
Tour of Chongming Island World Cup (Kirsten Wild)	Lizzie Armitstead	Boels–Dolmans	Pauline Ferrand-Prévot	Rebecca Wiasak	Pauline Ferrand-Prévot
Sparkassen Giro	Lizzie Armitstead	Rabobank-Liv Woman Cycling Team	Vera Koedooder	Iris Slappendel	Elena Cecchini
Sweden Open de Suède Vårgårda TTT	Lizzie Armitstead	Rabobank-Liv Woman Cycling Team	Vera Koedooder	Iris Slappendel	Elena Cecchini
Open de Suède Vårgårda	Lizzie Armitstead	Rabobank-Liv Woman Cycling Team	Vera Koedooder	Iris Slappendel	Elena Cecchini
GP de Plouay	Lizzie Armitstead	Rabobank-Liv Woman Cycling Team	Vera Koedooder	Iris Slappendel	Elena Cecchini

== Teams ==
The top 20 teams in the UCI Women's Teams Ranking as of 10 January 2014 have automatically the right to start in the races and are listed below. Other 2014 UCI Women's Teams are only allowed to start after an invitation.

	Team	Nation
1	Rabobank-Liv Woman Cycling Team	Netherlands
2	Orica–AIS	Australia
3	Boels–Dolmans	Netherlands
4	Specialized–lululemon	United States
5	Hitec Products	Norway
6	Wiggle–Honda	Great Britain
7	Giant–Shimano	Netherlands
8	Alé–Cipollini	Italy
9	RusVelo	Russia
10	Astana BePink Women's Team	Italy
11	Estado De Mexico Faren	Mexico
12	Lotto–Belisol Ladies	Belgium
13	Optum p/b Kelly Benefit Strategies	United States
14	Bizkaia–Durango	Spain
15	Bigla Cycling Team	Switzerland
16	Servetto Footon	Italy
17	Top Girls Fassa Bortolo	Italy
18	S.C. Michela Fanini Rox	Italy
19	UnitedHealthcare Women's Team	United States
20	Lointek	Spain

== See also ==
- 2014 in women's road cycling
