= Parkhotel Valkenburg Continental Team =

Parkhotel Valkenburg Continental Team is the name of two Netherlands-based cycling teams:

- Parkhotel Valkenburg Continental Team (women's team)
- Parkhotel Valkenburg Continental Team (men's team)
