= 2014 GP de Plouay =

2014 UCI Women's Road World Cup, race 9 of 9

Race details
- Dates: 30 August 2014
- Stages: 1
- Distance: 135 km (84 mi)

Results
	Winner	Lucinda Brand (NED)	(Rabobank-Liv Woman Cycling Team)
	Second	Marianne Vos (NED)	(Rabobank-Liv Woman Cycling Team)
	Third	Pauline Ferrand-Prévot (NED)	(Rabobank-Liv Woman Cycling Team)

The 2014 GP de Plouay was the 14th running on the GP de Plouay, a women's road race in Plouay, France. It was held on 30 August 2014 over a distance of 135 kilometres (83.9 miles) and was the ninth and final race of the 2014 UCI Women's Road World Cup season.

== Results ==
	Cyclists	Team	Time	World Cup points
1	Lucinda Brand (NED)	Rabobank-Liv Woman Cycling Team		75
2	Marianne Vos (NED)	Rabobank-Liv Woman Cycling Team		50
3	Pauline Ferrand-Prévot (FRA)	Rabobank-Liv Woman Cycling Team		35
4	Rossella Ratto (ITA)	Estado de México–Faren Kuota		30
5	Anna van der Breggen (NED)	Rabobank-Liv Woman Cycling Team		27
6	Emma Johansson (SWE)	Orica–AIS		24
7	Elisa Longo Borghini (ITA)	Team Hitec Products		21
8	Lizzie Armitstead (GBR)	Team SD Worx–Protime		18
9	Alena Amialiusik (BLR)	Astana BePink		15
10	Tiffany Cromwell (AUS)	Velocio–SRAM Pro Cycling		11
