= Eline Gleditsch Brustad =

Norwegian cyclist

Personal information
- Born: 25 September 1994 (age 32) Norway

Cycling career
- Sport: Cycling
- Role: Rider

Eline Gleditsch Brustad (born 25 September 1994) is a Norwegian racing cyclist. She rode at the 2014 UCI Road World Championships.
