= Estado de México–Faren Kuota =

Mexican cycling team

Team information
- UCI code: FHF (2012); FLF (2013); EMF (2014)
- Registered: Italy (2012–2014); Mexico (2014)
- Founded: 2012
- Disbanded: 2014
- Discipline: Road
- Status: UCI Women's Team

Team name history
- 2012 2013 2013 2014: Faren-Honda Team; Faren-Let's Go Finland; Faren-Kuota; Estado de México–Faren Kuota

Estado de México–Faren Kuota (UCI team code: EMF) was a professional women's cycling team based in the Mexico, which competed in elite road bicycle racing events such as the UCI Women's Road World Cup.

== Team history ==
=== 2014 ===
==== Riders out ====
On September 18 Lucy Martin left the team, joining Matrix Fitness-Vulpine for the 2015 season. On October 11, Fabiana Luperini announced her retirement from the sport. On October 17 Rossella Ratto and Anna Trevisi left the team to join ASD Giusfredi Ciclismo for the 2015 season. On October 30, Maria Giuli Confalonieri and Arianna Fidanza left the team, joining Alé–Cipollini, along with Uenia Fernandes on November 5, for the 2015 season. On 12 November Borgato Giada retired from professional cycling.

== Major wins ==
2012
Oceania Cycling Championships — Road Race, Gracie Elvin
Stage 5 Energiewacht Tour, Nicole Cooke
Stage 2a Giro del Trentino Alto Adige, Fabiana Luperini
2013
Teams Classification Tour of Chongming Island
Points classification Tour Languedoc Roussillon, Marta Bastienelli

Stage 2, Marta Bastienelli

2014
Young rider classification The Women's Tour, Rossella Ratto

Stage 2, Rossella Ratto

Mountains classification Auensteiner-Radsporttage, Rossella Ratto

Young rider classification, Rossella Ratto

Young rider classification Tour Cycliste Féminin International de l'Ardèche, Rossella Ratto

Mountains classification, Rossella Ratto
Sprints classification, Elena Cecchini
Combination classification, Rossella Ratto

Youth classification UCI Women's Road World Cup, Elena Cecchini
Giro dell'Emilia Internazionale Donne Elite, Rossella Ratto

== National & European Champions ==
2012
Switzerland Road Race, Jennifer Hohl
Russia Road Race, Yulia Blindyuk
2013
Switzerland Time Trial, Patricia Schwager
Finland Time Trial, Sari Saarelainen
U23 European Road Race, Susanna Zorzi
U23 European Track, Maria Giulia Confalonieri
Italian Track (Points race), Elena Cecchini
Italian Track (Team Pursuit), Elena Cecchini
2014
Italian Road Race, Elena Cecchini
Italian Track (Team Pursuit), Elena Cecchini
