= 2014 Specialized–lululemon season =

2014 Specialized–lululemon
- Manager: Kristy Scrymgeour

The 2014 women's road cycling season was the twelfth for the Specialized–lululemon cycling team, which began as the T-Mobile team in 2003. After being part of the team since 2005, Ina-Yoko Teutenberg left the team for her retirement. Also Ellen van Dijk, the top ranked UCI and best rider of the 2013 season left the team, together with Gillian Carleton and Katie Colclough. Chantal Blaak, Karol-Ann Canuel, Élise Delzenne and Tiffany Cromwell joined the team with the last becoming the leader of the team.

== Roster ==
Four riders joined and four riders left the team. After being part of the team since 2005, sprinter Ina-Yoko Teutenberg left the team for retirement after a crash in March 2013. The second important rider who left is Ellen van Dijk who was top ranked in the 2013 UCI World Ranking and 2013 UCI World Cup and was important for the many team time trial victories. Van Dijk signed a contract for three years with the Dutch Boels–Dolmans Cycling Team. Katie Colclough announced her retirement at the age of only 23 and Gillian Carleton left the team after to recover from a depression.

The new riders were the French Élise Delzenne, the Dutch Chantal Blaak, the Canadian Karol-Ann Canuel and the Australian Tiffany Cromwell. Cromwell won the Omloop het Nieuwsblad in 2013 and became the leader of the team.

As of 1 January 2014. Ages as of 1 January 2014.

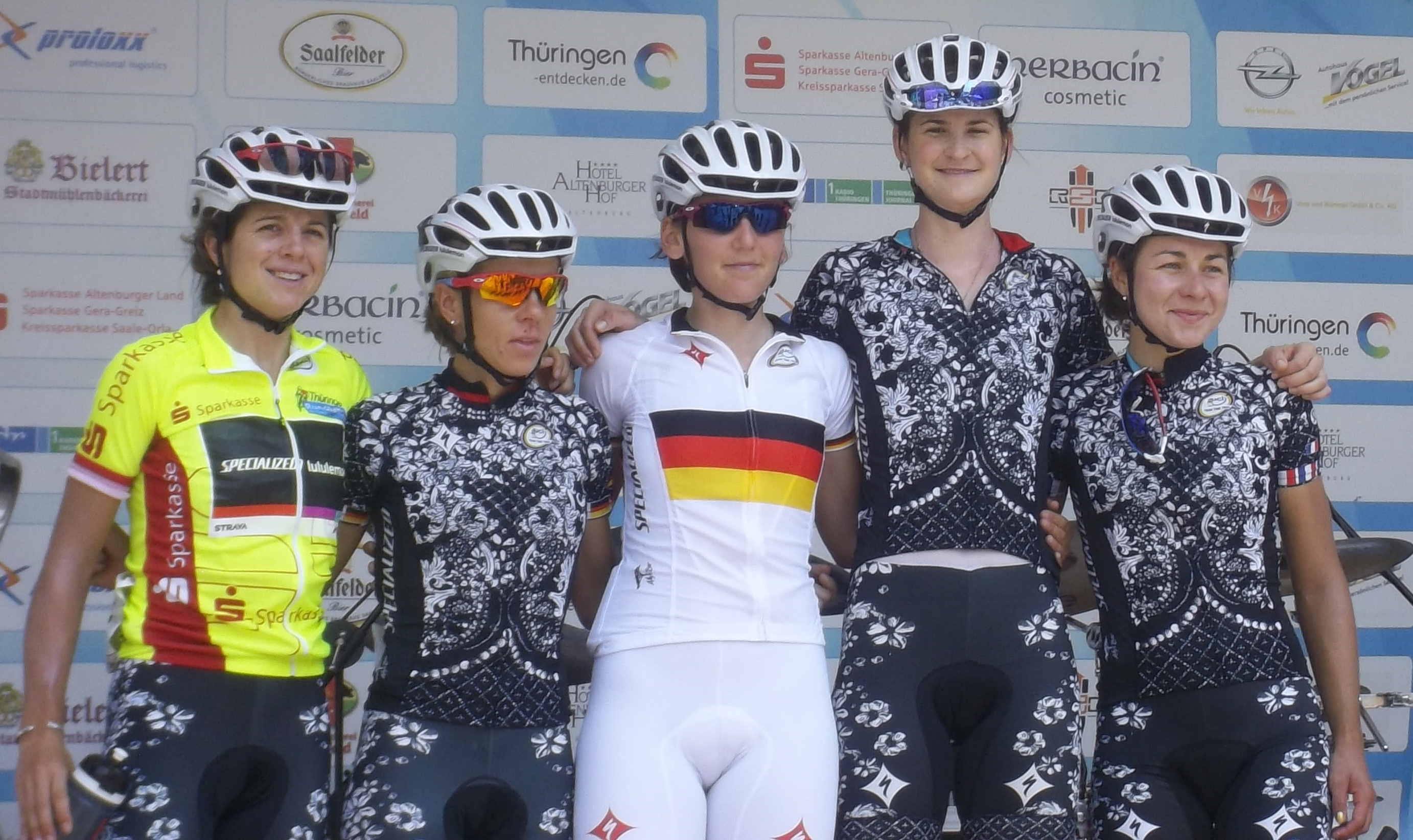
Five riders of the team at the 2014 Thüringen Rundfahrt der Frauen.

Rider	Date of birth
Chantal Blaak (NED)	October 22, 1989 (aged 24)
Lisa Brennauer (GER)	June 8, 1988 (aged 25)
Karol-Ann Canuel (CAN)	April 18, 1988 (aged 25)
Tiffany Cromwell (AUS)	July 6, 1988 (aged 25)
Élise Delzenne (FRA)	January 28, 1989 (aged 24)
Loren Rowney (AUS)	October 14, 1988 (aged 25)

Rider	Date of birth
Carmen Small (USA)	April 20, 1980 (aged 33)
Ally Stacher (USA)	June 8, 1987 (aged 26)
Evelyn Stevens (USA)	May 9, 1983 (aged 30)
Tayler Wiles (USA)	July 20, 1989 (aged 24)
Trixi Worrack (GER)	September 28, 1981 (aged 32)

Riders who joined the team for the 2014 season

Rider	2013 team
Chantal Blaak (NED)	AA Drink–leontien.nl
Tiffany Cromwell (AUS)	Orica–AIS
Karol-Ann Canuel (CAN)	Vienne Futuroscope
Élise Delzenne (FRA)	Bourgogne–Pro Dialog

Riders who left the team during or after the 2013 season

Rider	2014 team
Katie Colclough (GBR)	retired
Gillian Carleton (CAN)	paused
Ellen van Dijk (NED)	Boels–Dolmans Cycling Team
Ina-Yoko Teutenberg (GER)	retired
