= Team Picnic–PostNL (women's team) =

Dutch cycling team

Team Picnic PostNL

Team information
- UCI code: SKI (2012); ARW (2013); GIW (2014); TLP (2015–2016); SUN (2017–2020); DSM (2021–2023); DFP (2024); TPP (2025-)
- Registered: Netherlands
- Founded: 2011
- Discipline: Road
- Status: UCI Women's Team (2012–2019); UCI Women's WorldTeam (2020–present)
- Bicycles: Koga (2011); Felt (2012–2013); Giant (2014–2018); Cervélo (2019–2020); Scott (2021–2024); Lapierre Bikes (2025–)

Team name history
- 2011 2012 2012 2013 2014 2014 2015–2016 2017–2020 2021–2023 2023 2024 2025–: Skil–Argos; Skil Koga; Skil 1t4i Team Skil–Argos; Team Argos–Shimano; Team Giant–Shimano; Team Liv–Plantur; Team Sunweb; Team DSM; Team dsm–firmenich Team dsm–firmenich PostNL; Team Picnic PostNL

Team Picnic PostNL is a professional cycling team based in the Netherlands, which competes in elite road bicycle racing events such as the UCI Women's World Tour. The team is managed by Iwan Spekenbrink. The title sponsors of the team are Dutch online supermarket Picnic and the Dutch mail, parcel and e-commerce company PostNL.

== History ==
=== 2013 ===
The team's first overall General classification victory came in the Ladies Tour of Qatar, where Kirsten Wild won the overall classification, points classification and three stages. Wild went on to win the women's edition of Gent–Wevelgem, four stages of the Energiewacht Tour.

=== 2014 ===
2014 proved to be the team's standout seasons since its creation; Kirsten Wild successfully defended her Tour of Qatar title, taking 3 stage wins in the process, as well as teammate Amy Pieters taking a stage and the young rider classification. Pieters continued her good form winning the women's Omloop Het Nieuwsblad. The team's next GC victory came courtesy of Wild, at the Tour of Chongming Island. Claudia Häusler secured the team's final overall victory of the 2014 season, winning the 2014 La Route de France.

On 24 September 2014 the team announced that they had secured a four-year sponsorship deal with a German hair care company. For the 2015 season the team was known as Team Liv–Plantur, with the men's team becoming Team Giant-Alpecin.

On 1 September 2014 it was announced that Kirsten Wild would leave the team for Team Hitec Products. Sabrina Stultiens was the only rider who joined the team for the 2015 season.

=== 2017 ===
The team won the 2017 UCI Road World Championships – Women's team time trial.

=== 2024 ===
In 2024, Team dsm-firmenich PostNL became the first team in the history of cycling that won the opening stage of both the Tour de France and the Tour de France Femmes. After Romain Bardet won the opening stage of the men's Tour, Charlotte Kool won the opening stage of the Tour de France Femmes.

== Team roster ==
As of 25 January 2025.

Rider	Date of birth
Silje Bader (NED)	24 September 2005 (age 20)
Francesca Barale (ITA)	29 April 2003 (age 23)
Rachele Barbieri (ITA)	21 February 1997 (age 29)
Marta Cavalli (ITA)	18 March 1998 (age 28)
Eleonora Ciabocco (ITA)	4 March 2004 (age 22)
Pfeiffer Georgi (GBR)	27 September 2000 (age 25)
Ella Heremans (BEL)	28 March 2006 (age 20)
Megan Jastrab (USA)	29 January 2002 (age 24)
Franziska Koch (GER)	13 July 2000 (age 26)

Rider	Date of birth
Charlotte Kool (NED)	6 May 1999 (age 27)
Juliana Londoño (COL)	14 January 2005 (age 21)
Josie Nelson (GBR)	8 April 2002 (age 24)
Esmée Peperkamp (NED)	23 July 1997 (age 29)
Mara Roldan (CAN)	7 April 2004 (age 22)
Abi Smith (GBR)	1 April 2002 (age 24)
Becky Storrie (GBR)	27 September 1998 (age 27)
Elise Uijen (NED)	23 June 2003 (age 23)
Nienke Vinke (NED)	22 June 2004 (age 22)

== Major wins ==
2011
Track Cycling World Cup in Astana – team pursuit, Amy Pieters (with Ellen van Dijk and Kirsten Wild)
2012
Le Samyn des Dames, Adrie Visser
Ronde van Gelderland, Suzanne de Goede
Omloop der Kempen, Suzanne de Goede
Erondegemse Pijl, Adrie Visser
Sprint classification Belgium Tour, Janneke Busser Kanis
2013
Overall Ladies Tour of Qatar, Kirsten Wild

Points classification, Kirsten Wild
Stages 2, 3, & 4, Kirsten Wild

Gent–Wevelgem, Kirsten Wild
Points classification Energiewacht Tour, Kirsten Wild

Stages 1, 2, 3b & 4, Kirsten Wild

Ronde van Gelderland, Kirsten Wild
Stage 1 Tour of Chongming Island, Lucy Garner
Districtskampioenschap, Amy Pieters
Youth classification Belgium Tour, Amy Pieters

Stages 2 & 3, Kirsten Wild

Points classification Holland Ladies Tour, Kirsten Wild

Stages 1 & 3, Kirsten Wild
Stage 4, Elke Gebhardt

2014
Overall Ladies Tour of Qatar, Kirsten Wild

Points classification, Kirsten Wild
Youth classification, Amy Pieters
Stages 1, 3 & 4, Kirsten Wild
Stage 2, Amy Pieters

Omloop Het Nieuwsblad, Amy Pieters
Novilon EDR Cup, Kirsten Wild
Vlaams-Brabant Provincial Time Trial Championships, Maaike Polspoel
Points classification Energiewacht Tour, Kirsten Wild

Stage 1, Kirsten Wild

British rider classification The Women's Tour, Lucy Garner
Overall Tour of Chongming Island, Kirsten Wild

Points classification, Kirsten Wild
Stages 1 & 2, Kirsten Wild

Trofee Maarten Wynants, Maaike Polspoel
Tour of Chongming Island World Cup, Kirsten Wild
Parel van de Veluwe, Floortje Mackaij
Overall La Route de France, Claudia Häusler

Stage 1, Claudia Häusler
Stages 4 & 6, Kirsten Wild

Sprint classification Holland Ladies Tour, Sara Mustonen

Combativity award Stage 2, Willeke Knol

2015
Soudal Cyclocross Leuven, Sabrina Stultiens
Gent–Wevelgem, Floortje Mackaij
Stage 3 Festival Luxembourgeois du cyclisme féminin Elsy Jacobs, Floortje Mackaij
Prologue La Route de France, Amy Pieters
Stage 1 La Route de France, Lucy Garner
Stage 3 Belgium Tour, Floortje Mackaij
2016
Acht van Westerveld, Leah Kirchmann
Prologue Giro d'Italia Femminile, Leah Kirchmann
2017
Omloop Het Nieuwsblad, Lucinda Brand
Trofeo Alfredo Binda-Comune di Cittiglio, Coryn Rivera
Tour of Flanders for Women, Coryn Rivera
Overall Healthy Ageing Tour, Ellen van Dijk

Points classification, Ellen van Dijk
Teams classification
Stage 1a (ITT), Ellen van Dijk

Stage 3 Tour of California, Coryn Rivera
Stage 8 Giro d'Italia Femminile, Lucinda Brand
Stage 5 Tour de Feminin-O cenu Českého Švýcarska, Juliette Labous
Erondegemse Pijl, Julia Soek
Team classification Ladies Tour of Norway

Prologue, Ellen van Dijk

2018
Omloop van het Hageland, Ellen van Dijk
Omloop van de Westhoek, Floortje Mackaij
Zwevezele Koerse, Floortje Mackaij
Dwars door Vlaanderen, Ellen van Dijk
Points classification Thüringen Rundfahrt der Frauen, Coryn Rivera

Youth classification, Liane Lippert
Teams classification
Stages 1 & 3, Coryn Rivera
Stage 7 (ITT), Ellen van Dijk

Overall The Women's Tour, Coryn Rivera

Sprints classification, Coryn Rivera
Stage 2, Coryn Rivera

Points classification Tour de Feminin-O cenu Českého Švýcarska, Floortje Mackaij

Stages 1 & 4, Floortje Mackaij

Team classification Giro Rosa

Stage 1, Team time trial
Stage 5, Ruth Winder

Team time trial, Ladies Tour of Norway
Overall Madrid Challenge by La Vuelta, Ellen van Dijk

Stage 1, Team time trial

2019
Young rider classification Tour of California, Juliette Labous
Young rider classification Thüringen Rundfahrt der Frauen, Pernille Mathiesen

Team classification

Grand Prix Cycliste de Gatineau, Leah Kirchmann
Mountains classification Holland Ladies Tour, Lucinda Brand

Stage 4, Franziska Koch

2020
Points classification Women's Tour Down Under, Leah Kirchmann

Mountains classification, Liane Lippert
Youth classification, Liane Lippert
Team classification

2021
Scheldeprijs, Lorena Wiebes
Prologue Festival Elsy Jacobs, Lorena Wiebes
GP Eco-Struct, Lorena Wiebes
Stages 2 & 6 Thüringen Ladies Tour, Lorena Wiebes
Dwars door de Westhoek, Lorena Wiebes
Diamond Tour, Lorena Wiebes
Stage 1 Belgium Tour, Lorena Wiebes
Stages 5 & 8 Giro Rosa, Lorena Wiebes
Stage 10 Giro Rosa, Coryn Rivera
La Choralis Fourmies, Pfeiffer Georgi
Overall Trophée des Grimpeuses, Floortje Mackaij

1st Stage 2, Floortje Mackaij

Stages 4 & 5 The Women's Tour, Lorena Wiebes
Ronde van Drenthe, Lorena Wiebes
2022
GP Oetingen, Lorena Wiebes
Ronde van Drenthe, Lorena Wiebes
Nokere Koerse voor Dames, Lorena Wiebes
Scheldeprijs, Lorena Wiebes
GP Eco-Struct, Charlotte Kool
Team classification Itzulia Women
Overall Vuelta a Burgos Feminas, Juliette Labous
Overall RideLondon Classique, Lorena Wiebes

Points classification, Lorena Wiebes
Stages 1, 2 & 3, Lorena Wiebes

Stages 2, 3 & 6 The Women's Tour, Lorena Wiebes
Stage 7 Giro d'Italia Donne, Liane Lippert
Stages 1, 2, 3 & 5 Baloise Ladies Tour, Lorena Wiebes
Stages 1 & 5 Tour de France Femmes, Lorena Wiebes
Overall Simac Ladies Tour, Lorena Wiebes

Stages 1 & 2, Lorena Wiebes
Stage 3, Charlotte Kool

Stage 2 AG Tour de la Semois, Lorena Wiebes
Brabantse Wal Wielerevent, Lorena Wiebes
Binche-Chimay-Binche pour Dames, Lorena Wiebes

2023
Stages 1 & 4 UAE Tour, Charlotte Kool
Stage 4 Setmana Ciclista Valenciana, Elise Uijen
Classic Brugge-De Panne, Pfeiffer Georgi
Stage 2 La Vuelta Femenina, Charlotte Kool
ZLM Omloop der Kempen Ladies, Charlotte Kool
Overall RideLondon Classique, Charlotte Kool
Stages 1 & 2, Charlotte Kool
Dwars door de Westhoek, Pfeiffer Georgi
Prologue, Stages 1, 2 & 3, Baloise Ladies Tour, Charlotte Kool
Prologue & Stage 3 Simac Ladies Tour, Charlotte Kool
Binche-Chimay-Binche pour Dames, Pfeiffer Georgi

2024
Stage 4 Tour de Normandie Féminin, Josie Nelson
Stage 2 Baloise Ladies Tour, Charlotte Kool
Stages 1 & 2 Tour de France, Charlotte Kool

== Continental and national champions ==
2012
European U23 Track (Pursuit), Amy Pieters
2013
European Track (Points race), Kirsten Wild
Netherlands Track (Omnium), Kirsten Wild
Netherlands Track (Individual pursuit), Kirsten Wild
Netherlands Track (Scratch race), Kirsten Wild
Netherlands Track (Madison), Amy Pieters & Kelly Markus
2014
Netherlands Track (Points race), Kirsten Wild
Netherlands Track (Individual pursuit), Amy Pieters
Netherlands Track (Madison), Amy Pieters
2015
Netherlands Track (Scratch race), Amy Pieters
2017
European Time Trial Champion, Ellen van Dijk
2018
Netherlands Cyclo-cross, Lucinda Brand
Canada Time Trial, Leah Kirchmann
European Time Trial Champion, Ellen van Dijk
2019
Netherlands Cyclo-cross, Lucinda Brand
Canada Time Trial, Leah Kirchmann
2021
British Road Race, Pfeiffer Georgi
2022
British Under-23 Time Trial, Pfeiffer Georgi
Germany Road Race, Liane Lippert
Netherlands Track (Omnium), Lorena Wiebes
Netherlands Track (Elimination race), Lorena Wiebes
Netherlands Track (Madison), Lorena Wiebes
Netherlands Track (Scratch race), Lorena Wiebes
2023
British Road Race, Pfeiffer Georgi
France U23 Time Trial, Eglantine Rayer
2024
British Road Race, Pfeiffer Georgi
British Under-23 Time Trial, Josie Nelson
Germany Road Race, Franziska Koch
France Road Race, Juliette Labous
2025
Colombia Road Race, Juliana Londoño
Pan American Road Race, Juliana Londoño
