= 2014 Giro d'Italia Femminile =

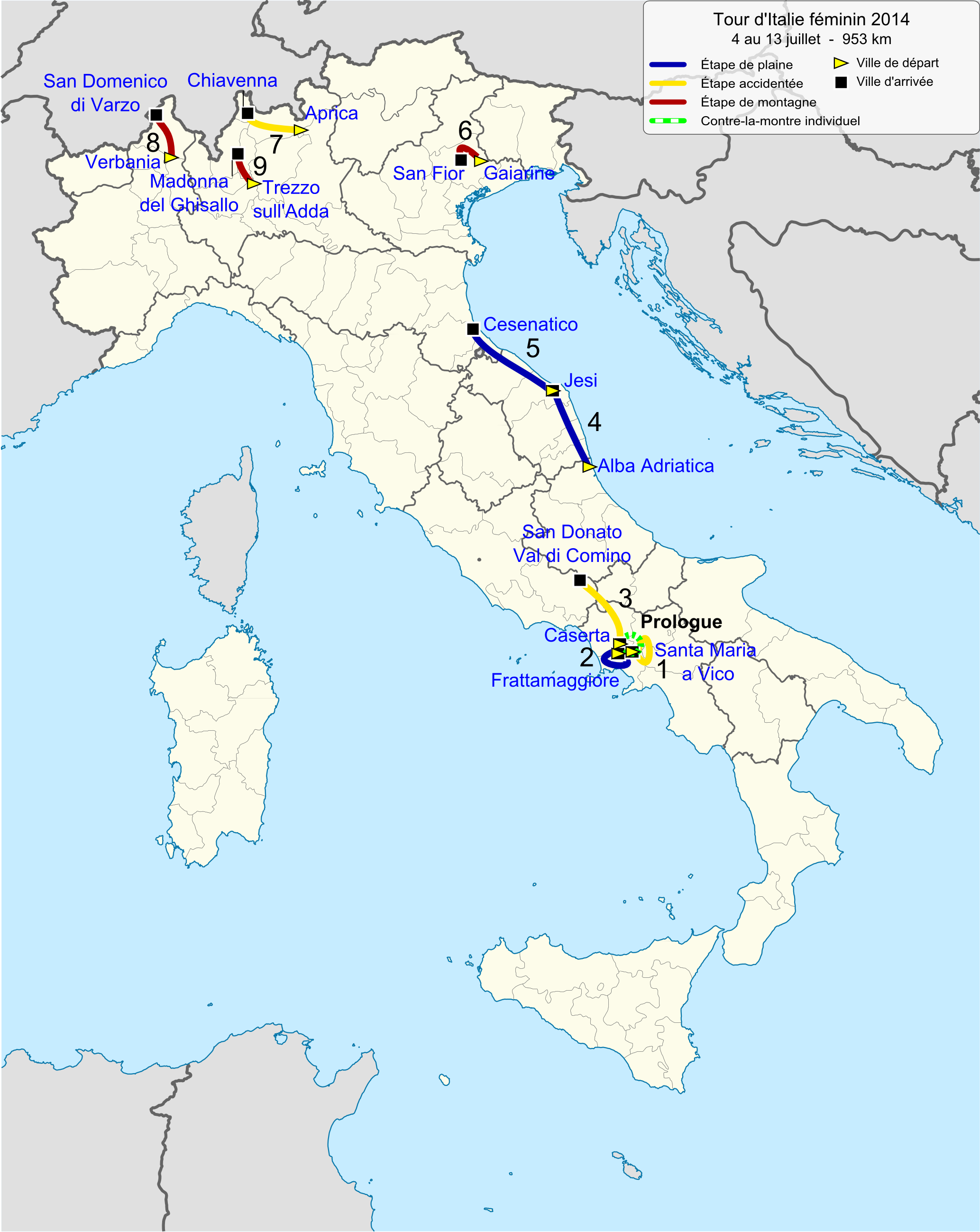

Race details
- Dates: July 4–13
- Stages: Prologue + 9 Stages
- Distance: 953 km (592 mi)
- Winning time: 25h 12' 07"

Results
Jersey awarded to the overall winner	Winner	Marianne Vos (NED)	(Rabobank-Liv Woman Cycling Team)
	Second	Pauline Ferrand-Prévot (FRA)	(Rabobank-Liv Woman Cycling Team)
	Third	Anna van der Breggen (NED)	(Rabobank-Liv Woman Cycling Team)
Jersey awarded to the points classification winner	Points	Marianne Vos (NED)	(Rabobank-Liv Woman Cycling Team)
Jersey awarded to the mountains classification winner	Mountains	Emma Pooley (GBR)	(Lotto–Belisol Ladies)
Jersey awarded to the youth classification winner	Youth	Pauline Ferrand-Prévot (FRA)	(Rabobank-Liv Woman Cycling Team)

The 2014 Giro d'Italia Femminile, or 2014 Giro Rosa, was the 25th running of the Giro d'Italia Femminile, the only remaining women's Grand Tour and the most prestigious stage race on the 2014 women's road cycling calendar. It was held over ten stages (nine stages plus a prologue) from 4 July to 13 July 2014, starting in Caserta and finishing in Madonna del Ghisallo.

Last years champion, Mara Abbott, sought to defend her title riding for the UnitedHealthcare team. Five-time winner Fabiana Luperini rode in the race for the 13th time, and plans to retire after the race.

Other highly regarded competitors included; British National Time Trial Champion Emma Pooley (Lotto–Belisol Ladies), Olympic and World Road Race Champion Marianne Vos (Rabobank-Liv Woman Cycling Team), current World Time Trial Champion Ellen van Dijk (Boels–Dolmans), Evelyn Stevens (Specialized–lululemon), Alena Amialiusik (Astana BePink), Emma Johansson (Orica–AIS), Giorgia Bronzini and Linda Villumsen (Wiggle–Honda) and finally Elisa Longo Borghini (Hitec Products).

== Teams ==
20 teams competed in the race:

- Orica–AIS
- Giant–Shimano
- UnitedHealthcare Pro Cycling
- Alé–Cipollini
- Top Girls Fassa Bortolo
- RusVelo
- Lotto–Belisol Ladies
- Vaiano Fondriest
- Rabobank-Liv Woman Cycling Team
- Estado de México–Faren Kuota
- Boels–Dolmans
- Specialized–lululemon
- S.C. Michela Fanini Rox
- Astana BePink
- Servetto Footon
- BTC City Ljubljana
- Wiggle–Honda
- Hitec Products UCK
- Forno d'Asolo–Astute
- Bizkaia–Durango

== Stages ==
=== Prologue ===
4 July 2014 – Caserta to Caserta, 2.05 km (1.3 mi)

Prologue Result & General classification

	Rider	Team	Time
1	Annemiek van Vleuten (NED)	Rabobank-Liv Woman Cycling Team	2' 26"
2	Marianne Vos (NED)	Rabobank-Liv Woman Cycling Team	+ 1"
3	Pauline Ferrand-Prévot (FRA)	Rabobank-Liv Woman Cycling Team	+ 5"
4	Anna van der Breggen (NED)	Rabobank-Liv Woman Cycling Team	+ 7"
5	Melissa Hoskins (AUS)	Orica–AIS	+ 8"
6	Roxane Knetemann (NED)	Rabobank-Liv Woman Cycling Team	+ 8"
7	Jolien D'Hoore (BEL)	Lotto–Belisol Ladies	+ 8"
8	Shelley Olds (USA)	Alé–Cipollini	+ 10"
9	Ellen van Dijk (NED)	Boels–Dolmans	+ 10"
10	Amy Pieters (NED)	Giant–Shimano	+ 10"

=== Stage 1 ===
5 July 2014 – Santa Maria a Vico to Santa Maria a Vico, 95.2 km (59.2 mi)

Stage 1 result

	Rider	Team	Time
1	Marianne Vos (NED)	Rabobank-Liv Woman Cycling Team	2h 42' 03"
2	Elisa Longo Borghini (ITA)	Hitec Products	+ 4"
3	Pauline Ferrand-Prévot (FRA)	Rabobank-Liv Woman Cycling Team	+ 5"
4	Claudia Häusler (GER)	Giant–Shimano	+ 1' 20"
5	Megan Guarnier (USA)	Boels–Dolmans	+ 1' 20"
6	Anna van der Breggen (NED)	Rabobank-Liv Woman Cycling Team	+ 1' 20"
7	Emma Johansson (SWE)	Orica–AIS	+ 1' 20"
8	Ashleigh Moolman (RSA)	Hitec Products	+ 1' 20"
9	Mara Abbott (USA)	UnitedHealthcare	+ 1' 24"
10	Audrey Cordon (FRA)	Hitec Products	+ 1' 24"

General Classification after Stage 1

	Rider	Team	Time
1	Marianne Vos (NED)	Rabobank-Liv Woman Cycling Team	2h 44' 20"
2	Pauline Ferrand-Prévot (FRA)	Rabobank-Liv Woman Cycling Team	+ 15"
3	Elisa Longo Borghini (ITA)	Hitec Products	+ 23"
4	Anna van der Breggen (NED)	Rabobank-Liv Woman Cycling Team	+ 1' 36"
5	Ashleigh Moolman (RSA)	Hitec Products	+ 1' 42"
6	Claudia Häusler (GER)	Giant–Shimano	+ 1' 42"
7	Emma Johansson (SWE)	Orica–AIS	+ 1' 44"
8	Megan Guarnier (USA)	Boels–Dolmans	+ 1' 44"
9	Audrey Cordon (FRA)	Hitec Products	+ 1' 55"
10	Annemiek van Vleuten (NED)	Rabobank-Liv Woman Cycling Team	+ 2' 06"

=== Stage 2 ===
6 July 2014 – Frattamaggiore to Frattamaggiore, 120 km (74.6 mi)

Stage 2 result

	Rider	Team	Time
1	Giorgia Bronzini (ITA)	Wiggle–Honda	2h 54' 36"
2	Marianne Vos (NED)	Rabobank-Liv Woman Cycling Team	s.t.
3	Shelley Olds (USA)	Alé–Cipollini	s.t.
4	Carmen Small (USA)	Specialized–lululemon	s.t.
5	Annemiek van Vleuten (NED)	Rabobank-Liv Woman Cycling Team	s.t.
6	Barbara Guarischi (NED)	Alé–Cipollini	s.t.
7	Melissa Hoskins (AUS)	Orica–AIS	s.t.
8	Giada Borgato (ITA)	Estado de México–Faren Kuota	s.t.
9	Pauline Ferrand-Prévot (FRA)	Rabobank-Liv Woman Cycling Team	s.t.
10	Emma Johansson (SWE)	Orica–AIS	s.t.

General Classification after Stage 2

	Rider	Team	Time
1	Marianne Vos (NED)	Rabobank-Liv Woman Cycling Team	5h 38' 50"
2	Pauline Ferrand-Prévot (FRA)	Rabobank-Liv Woman Cycling Team	+ 21"
3	Elisa Longo Borghini (ITA)	Hitec Products	+ 29"
4	Emma Johansson (SWE)	Orica–AIS	+ 1' 50"
5	Megan Guarnier (USA)	Boels–Dolmans	+ 1' 50"
6	Claudia Häusler (GER)	Giant–Shimano	+ 1' 53"
7	Anna van der Breggen (NED)	Rabobank-Liv Woman Cycling Team	+ 1' 54"
8	Ashleigh Moolman (RSA)	Hitec Products	+ 2' 00"
9	Annemiek van Vleuten (NED)	Rabobank-Liv Woman Cycling Team	+ 2' 12"
10	Audrey Cordon (FRA)	Hitec Products	+ 2' 13"

=== Stage 3 ===
In the 2014 edition of the race there are a number of stages which contain critical climbs which will favor the races who have General classification ambitions. The first of these notable climbs comes on Stage 3, San Donato Val di Comino is over 4.5 km at an average of 4.7%.

7 July 2014 – Caserta to San Donato Val di Comino, 125.3 km (77.9 mi)

Stage 3 result

	Rider	Team	Time
1	Annemiek van Vleuten (NED)	Rabobank-Liv Woman Cycling Team	3h 20' 50"
2	Elena Berlato (ITA)	Alé–Cipollini	+ 10"
3	Mayuko Hagiwara (JPN)	Wiggle–Honda	+ 16"
4	Doris Schweizer (SWI)	Astana BePink	+ 20"
5	Marianne Vos (NED)	Rabobank-Liv Woman Cycling Team	+ 21"
6	Claudia Häusler (GER)	Orica–AIS	+ 21"
7	Pauline Ferrand-Prévot (FRA)	Rabobank-Liv Woman Cycling Team	+ 21"
8	Megan Guarnier (AUS)	Boels–Dolmans	+ 21"
9	Emma Johansson (SWE)	Orica–AIS	+ 21"
10	Ashleigh Moolman (RSA)	Hitec Products	+ 21"

General Classification after Stage 3

	Rider	Team	Time
1	Marianne Vos (NED)	Rabobank-Liv Woman Cycling Team	9h 00' 01"
2	Pauline Ferrand-Prévot (FRA)	Rabobank-Liv Woman Cycling Team	+ 21"
3	Elisa Longo Borghini (ITA)	Hitec Products	+ 29"
4	Annemiek van Vleuten (NED)	Rabobank-Liv Woman Cycling Team	+ 1' 41"
5	Emma Johansson (SWE)	Orica–AIS	+ 1' 50"
6	Megan Guarnier (USA)	Boels–Dolmans	+ 1' 50"
7	Claudia Häusler (GER)	Giant–Shimano	+ 1' 53"
8	Anna van der Breggen (NED)	Rabobank-Liv Woman Cycling Team	+ 1' 54"
9	Ashleigh Moolman (RSA)	Hitec Products	+ 2' 00"
10	Audrey Cordon (FRA)	Hitec Products	+ 2' 24"

=== Stage 4 ===
Approximately 15 km from the finish of Stage 4 riders will face the Torre di Jesi, a climb of 2.3 km in length at an average of over 4.5%.

8 July 2014 – Alba Adriatica to Jesi, 118 km (73.3 mi)

Stage 4 result

	Rider	Team	Time
1	Marianne Vos (NED)	Rabobank-Liv Woman Cycling Team	3h 04' 11"
2	Shelley Olds (USA)	Alé–Cipollini	s.t.
3	Lucinda Brand (NED)	Rabobank-Liv Woman Cycling Team	s.t.
4	Emma Johansson (SWE)	Orica–AIS	s.t.
5	Jolien D'Hoore (BEL)	Lotto–Belisol Ladies	s.t.
6	Marta Tagliaferro (ITA)	Alé–Cipollini	s.t.
7	Elisa Longo Borghini (ITA)	Hitec Products	s.t.
8	Pauline Ferrand-Prévot (FRA)	Rabobank-Liv Woman Cycling Team	s.t.
9	Simona Frapporti (ITA)	Astana BePink	s.t.
10	Barbara Guarischi (ITA)	Alé–Cipollini	s.t.

General Classification after Stage 4

	Rider	Team	Time
1	Marianne Vos (NED)	Rabobank-Liv Woman Cycling Team	12h 04' 02"
2	Pauline Ferrand-Prévot (FRA)	Rabobank-Liv Woman Cycling Team	+ 31"
3	Elisa Longo Borghini (ITA)	Hitec Products	+ 39"
4	Annemiek van Vleuten (NED)	Rabobank-Liv Woman Cycling Team	+ 1' 51"
5	Emma Johansson (SWE)	Orica–AIS	+ 2' 00"
6	Megan Guarnier (USA)	Boels–Dolmans	+ 2' 00"
7	Claudia Häusler (GER)	Giant–Shimano	+ 2' 03"
8	Anna van der Breggen (NED)	Rabobank-Liv Woman Cycling Team	+ 2' 04"
9	Ashleigh Moolman (RSA)	Hitec Products	+ 2' 08"
10	Audrey Cordon (FRA)	Hitec Products	+ 2' 34"

=== Stage 5 ===
9 July 2014 – Jesi to Cesenatico, 118.3 km (73.5 mi)

Stage 5 result

	Rider	Team	Time
1	Marianne Vos (NED)	Rabobank-Liv Woman Cycling Team	2h 53' 30"
2	Giorgia Bronzini (ITA)	Wiggle–Honda	s.t.
3	Shelley Olds (USA)	Alé–Cipollini	s.t.
4	Emma Johansson (SWE)	Orica–AIS	s.t.
5	Chloe Hosking (AUS)	Hitec Products	s.t.
6	Annalisa Cucinotta (ITA)	Servetto Footon	s.t.
7	Carmen Small (USA)	Specialized–lululemon	s.t.
8	Giada Borgato (ITA)	Estado de México–Faren Kuota	s.t.
9	Lucy Garner (GBR)	Wiggle–Honda	s.t.
10	Edita Janeliūnaitė (LIT)	Forno d'Asolo–Astute	s.t.

General Classification after Stage 5

	Rider	Team	Time
1	Marianne Vos (NED)	Rabobank-Liv Woman Cycling Team	14h 57' 22"
2	Pauline Ferrand-Prévot (FRA)	Rabobank-Liv Woman Cycling Team	+ 41"
3	Elisa Longo Borghini (ITA)	Hitec Products	+ 49"
4	Annemiek van Vleuten (NED)	Rabobank-Liv Woman Cycling Team	+ 2' 01"
5	Emma Johansson (SWE)	Orica–AIS	+ 2' 10"
6	Megan Guarnier (USA)	Boels–Dolmans	+ 2' 10"
7	Claudia Häusler (GER)	Giant–Shimano	+ 2' 13"
8	Anna van der Breggen (NED)	Rabobank-Liv Woman Cycling Team	+ 2' 14"
9	Ashleigh Moolman (RSA)	Hitec Products	+ 2' 18"
10	Audrey Cordon (FRA)	Hitec Products	+ 2' 44"

=== Stage 6 ===
Stage 6 sees one of the most significant climbs of the 2014 edition of the race. The Samede La Crossetta gains almost 700 metres of altitude in approximately 8 km, therefore averaging over 8%.

10 July 2014 – Gaiarine to San Fior, 112 km (69.6 mi)

Stage 6 result

	Rider	Team	Time
1	Emma Pooley (GBR)	Lotto–Belisol Ladies	3h 05' 46"
2	Anna van der Breggen (NED)	Rabobank-Liv Woman Cycling Team	+ 15"
3	Marianne Vos (NED)	Rabobank-Liv Woman Cycling Team	+ 15"
4	Pauline Ferrand-Prévot (FRA)	Rabobank-Liv Woman Cycling Team	+ 15"
5	Claudia Häusler (GER)	Giant–Shimano	+ 15"
6	Elisa Longo Borghini (ITA)	Hitec Products	+ 15"
7	Mara Abbott (USA)	UnitedHealthcare	+ 15"
8	Katarzyna Niewiadoma (POL)	Rabobank-Liv Woman Cycling Team	+ 1' 06"
9	Annemiek van Vleuten (NED)	Rabobank-Liv Woman Cycling Team	+ 4' 19"
10	Ashleigh Moolman (RSA)	Hitec Products	+4' 19"

General Classification after Stage 6

	Rider	Team	Time
1	Marianne Vos (NED)	Rabobank-Liv Woman Cycling Team	18h 03' 19"
2	Pauline Ferrand-Prévot (FRA)	Rabobank-Liv Woman Cycling Team	+ 45"
3	Elisa Longo Borghini (ITA)	Hitec Products	+ 53"
4	Anna van der Breggen (NED)	Rabobank-Liv Woman Cycling Team	+ 2' 12"
5	Claudia Häusler (GER)	Giant–Shimano	+ 2' 17"
6	Mara Abbott (USA)	UnitedHealthcare	+ 2' 58"
7	Katarzyna Niewiadoma (POL)	Rabobank-Liv Woman Cycling Team	+ 4' 41"
8	Annemiek van Vleuten (NED)	Rabobank-Liv Woman Cycling Team	+ 6' 09"
9	Emma Johansson (SWE)	Orica–AIS	+ 6' 18"
10	Megan Guarnier (USA)	Boels–Dolmans	+ 6' 18"

=== Stage 7 ===
11 July 2014 – Aprica to Chiavenna, 91.8 km (57.0 mi)

Stage 7 result

	Rider	Team	Time
1	Marianne Vos (NED)	Rabobank-Liv Woman Cycling Team	2h 36' 43"
2	Giorgia Bronzini (ITA)	Wiggle–Honda	s.t.
3	Emma Johansson (SWE)	Orica–AIS	s.t.
4	Pauline Ferrand-Prévot (FRA)	Rabobank-Liv Woman Cycling Team	s.t.
5	Shelley Olds (USA)	Alé–Cipollini	s.t.
6	Anna van der Breggen (NED)	Rabobank-Liv Woman Cycling Team	s.t.
7	Annemiek van Vleuten (NED)	Rabobank-Liv Woman Cycling Team	s.t.
8	Daiva Tušlaitė (LTU)	Forno d'Asolo–Astute	s.t.
9	Elisa Longo Borghini (ITA)	Hitec Products	s.t.
10	Megan Guarnier (USA)	Boels–Dolmans	s.t.

General Classification after Stage 7

	Rider	Team	Time
1	Marianne Vos (NED)	Rabobank-Liv Woman Cycling Team	20h 39' 52"
2	Pauline Ferrand-Prévot (FRA)	Rabobank-Liv Woman Cycling Team	+ 54"
3	Elisa Longo Borghini (ITA)	Hitec Products	+ 1' 03"
4	Anna van der Breggen (NED)	Rabobank-Liv Woman Cycling Team	+ 2' 20"
5	Claudia Häusler (GER)	Giant–Shimano	+ 2' 24"
6	Mara Abbott (USA)	UnitedHealthcare	+ 3' 08"
7	Katarzyna Niewiadoma (POL)	Rabobank-Liv Woman Cycling Team	+ 4' 51"
8	Annemiek van Vleuten (NED)	Rabobank-Liv Woman Cycling Team	+ 6' 19"
9	Emma Johansson (SWE)	Orica–AIS	+ 6' 24"
10	Megan Guarnier (USA)	Boels–Dolmans	+ 6' 28"

=== Stage 8 ===
Stage 8 finishes in the first of two consecutive summit finishes. The San Domenico di Varzo climb is 11 km averaging 8%.

12 July 2014 – Verbania to San Domenico di Varzo, 90.3 km (56.1 mi)

Stage 8 result

	Rider	Team	Time
1	Emma Pooley (GBR)	Lotto–Belisol Ladies	2h 32' 49"
2	Mara Abbott (USA)	UnitedHealthcare	+ 5"
3	Anna van der Breggen (NED)	Rabobank-Liv Woman Cycling Team	+ 29"
4	Pauline Ferrand-Prévot (FRA)	Rabobank-Liv Woman Cycling Team	+ 53"
5	Megan Guarnier (USA)	Boels–Dolmans	+ 1' 27"
6	Marianne Vos (NED)	Rabobank-Liv Woman Cycling Team	+ 1' 28"
7	Claudia Häusler (GER)	Giant–Shimano	+ 1' 53"
8	Annemiek van Vleuten (NED)	Rabobank-Liv Woman Cycling Team	+ 1' 53"
9	Tetyana Ryabchenko (UKR)	S.C. Michela Fanini Rox	+ 1' 58"
10	Emma Johansson (SWE)	Orica–AIS	+ 2' 01"

General Classification after Stage 8

	Rider	Team	Time
1	Marianne Vos (NED)	Rabobank-Liv Woman Cycling Team	23h 14' 09"
2	Pauline Ferrand-Prévot (FRA)	Rabobank-Liv Woman Cycling Team	+ 16"
3	Anna van der Breggen (NED)	Rabobank-Liv Woman Cycling Team	+ 1' 17"
4	Mara Abbott (USA)	UnitedHealthcare	+ 1' 39"
5	Elisa Longo Borghini (ITA)	Hitec Products	+ 1' 46"
6	Claudia Häusler (GER)	Giant–Shimano	+ 2' 47"
7	Megan Guarnier (USA)	Boels–Dolmans	+ 6' 27"
8	Annemiek van Vleuten (NED)	Rabobank-Liv Woman Cycling Team	+ 6' 44"
9	Emma Johansson (SWE)	Orica–AIS	+ 6' 57"
10	Katarzyna Niewiadoma (POL)	Rabobank-Liv Woman Cycling Team	+ 7' 10"

=== Stage 9 ===
The second of the two mountain finishes is the climb at Madonna del Ghisallo, a 10 km climb at just over 5%.

13 July 2014 – Trezzo sull'Adda to Madonna del Ghisallo, 80.1 km (49.8 mi)

Stage 9 result

	Rider	Team	Time
1	Emma Pooley (GBR)	Lotto–Belisol Ladies	1h 57' 40"
2	Pauline Ferrand-Prévot (FRA)	Rabobank-Liv Woman Cycling Team	+ 25"
3	Marianne Vos (NED)	Rabobank-Liv Woman Cycling Team	+ 25"
4	Anna van der Breggen (NED)	Rabobank-Liv Woman Cycling Team	+ 33"
5	Mara Abbott (USA)	UnitedHealthcare	+ 33"
6	Elisa Longo Borghini (ITA)	Hitec Products	+ 38"
7	Claudia Häusler (GER)	Giant–Shimano	+ 49"
8	Annemiek van Vleuten (NED)	Rabobank-Liv Woman Cycling Team	+ 50"
9	Megan Guarnier (USA)	Boels–Dolmans	+ 50"
10	Tetyana Ryabchenko (UKR)	S.C. Michela Fanini Rox	+ 1' 52"

General Classification after Stage 9

	Rider	Team	Time
1	Marianne Vos (NED)	Rabobank-Liv Woman Cycling Team	25h 12' 07"
2	Pauline Ferrand-Prévot (FRA)	Rabobank-Liv Woman Cycling Team	+ 15"
3	Anna van der Breggen (NED)	Rabobank-Liv Woman Cycling Team	+ 1' 32"
4	Mara Abbott (USA)	UnitedHealthcare	+ 1' 54"
5	Elisa Longo Borghini (ITA)	Hitec Products	+ 2' 06"
6	Claudia Häusler (GER)	Giant–Shimano	+ 3' 18"
7	Megan Guarnier (USA)	Boels–Dolmans	+ 6' 59"
8	Annemiek van Vleuten (NED)	Rabobank-Liv Woman Cycling Team	+ 7' 16"
9	Emma Pooley (GBR)	Lotto–Belisol Ladies	+ 8' 23"
10	Emma Johansson (SWE)	Orica–AIS	+ 8' 36"

== Classification leadership ==
Stage	Winner	General classification	Points classification	Mountains classification	Young rider classification	Italian rider classification
P	Annemiek van Vleuten	Annemiek van Vleuten	Annemiek van Vleuten	Not awarded	Pauline Ferrand-Prévot	Tatiana Guderzo
1	Marianne Vos	Marianne Vos	Marianne Vos	Ashleigh Moolman	Pauline Ferrand-Prévot	Elisa Longo Borghini
2	Giorgia Bronzini	Marianne Vos	Marianne Vos	Ashleigh Moolman	Pauline Ferrand-Prévot	Elisa Longo Borghini
3	Annemiek van Vleuten	Marianne Vos	Marianne Vos	Valentina Scandolara	Pauline Ferrand-Prévot	Elisa Longo Borghini
4	Marianne Vos	Marianne Vos	Marianne Vos	Valentina Scandolara	Pauline Ferrand-Prévot	Elisa Longo Borghini
5	Marianne Vos	Marianne Vos	Marianne Vos	Valentina Scandolara	Pauline Ferrand-Prévot	Elisa Longo Borghini
6	Emma Pooley	Marianne Vos	Marianne Vos	Valentina Scandolara	Pauline Ferrand-Prévot	Elisa Longo Borghini
7	Marianne Vos	Marianne Vos	Marianne Vos	Emma Pooley	Pauline Ferrand-Prévot	Elisa Longo Borghini
8	Emma Pooley	Marianne Vos	Marianne Vos	Emma Pooley	Pauline Ferrand-Prévot	Elisa Longo Borghini
9	Emma Pooley	Marianne Vos	Marianne Vos	Emma Pooley	Pauline Ferrand-Prévot	Elisa Longo Borghini
Final		Marianne Vos	Marianne Vos	Emma Pooley	Pauline Ferrand-Prévot	Elisa Longo Borghini

=== Sub-classifications ===
Points Classification

	Rider	Team	Points
1	Marianne Vos (NED)	Rabobank-Liv Woman Cycling Team	115
2	Pauline Ferrand-Prévot (FRA)	Rabobank-Liv Woman Cycling Team	65
3	Annemiek van Vleuten (NED)	Rabobank-Liv Woman Cycling Team	48
4	Anna van der Breggen (NED)	Rabobank-Liv Woman Cycling Team	48
5	Emma Pooley (GBR)	Wiggle–Honda	45

Mountains classification

	Rider	Team	Points
1	Emma Pooley (GBR)	Lotto–Belisol Ladies	64
2	Valentina Scandolara (ITA)	Orica–AIS	33
3	Anna van der Breggen (NED)	Rabobank-Liv Woman Cycling Team	31
4	Pauline Ferrand-Prévot (FRA)	Rabobank-Liv Woman Cycling Team	26
5	Mara Abbott (USA)	UnitedHealthcare	25

Youth Classification

	Rider	Team	Time
1	Pauline Ferrand-Prévot (FRA)	Rabobank-Liv Woman Cycling Team	18h 04' 04"
2	Elisa Longo Borghini (ITA)	Hitec Products	+ 8"
3	Katarzyna Niewiadoma (POL)	Rabobank-Liv Woman Cycling Team	+ 3' 56"
4	Asja Paladin (ITA)	Top Girls Fassa Bortolo	+ 21' 22"
5	Alice Maria Arzuffi (ITA)	Astana BePink	+ 24' 44"

Italian rider classification

	Rider	Team	Time
1	Elisa Longo Borghini (ITA)	Hitec Products	18h 04' 12"
2	Fabiana Luperini (ITA)	Estado de México–Faren Kuota	+ 8' 40"
3	Elena Berlato (ITA)	Alé–Cipollini	+ 18' 17"
4	Tatiana Guderzo (ITA)	Alé–Cipollini	+ 21' 10"
5	Asja Paladin (ITA)	Top Girls Fassa Bortolo	+ 21' 14"

=== Points scales ===
The following table shows the number of points awarded for the Points and Mountains classifications. With respect to the Mountains classification, the table shows how the points are scaled dependent on the category of the climb.

		Position									
Competition	Points scale	1st	2nd	3rd	4th	5th	6th	7th	8th	9th	10th
Points classification	N/A	15	12	10	8	6	5	4	3	2	1
Mountains classification	1st Category	13	11	9	7	5	–	–	–	–	–
Mountains classification	2nd Category	7	5	3	2	1	–	–	–	–	–
Mountains classification	3rd Category	5	4	3	2	1	–	–	–	–	–

=== Time bonuses ===
Time bonuses of 10, 6, and 4 seconds are awarded to the first three riders across the finish line of each stage (except the prologue). Time bonuses of 3, 2, and 1 seconds are awarded to the first three riders to cross the line of each intermediate sprint.
