= 2014 Ladies Tour of Qatar =

Race details
- Dates: 4–7 February
- Stages: 4
- Distance: 388 km (241 mi)
- Winning time: 9h 37' 01"

Results
Jersey awarded to the overall winner	Winner	Kirsten Wild (Netherlands)	(Team Giant–Shimano)
	Second	Amy Pieters (Netherlands)	(Team Giant–Shimano)
	Third	Chloe Hosking (Australia)	(Hitec Products UCK)
Jersey awarded to the points classification winner	Points	Kirsten Wild (Netherlands)	(Team Giant–Shimano)
Jersey awarded to the youth classification winner	Youth	Amy Pieters (Netherlands)	(Team Giant–Shimano)
	Team	Orica–AIS	

The 2014 Ladies Tour of Qatar was the 6th edition of the Ladies Tour of Qatar. It was organised by the Qatar Cycling Federation with technical and sports-related assistance from Amaury Sport Organisation (A.S.O.) under the regulations of the Union Cycliste Internationale (category 2.1). It took place from Tuesday 4 February until Friday 7 February 2014 and consisted of 4 stages. 15 teams of 6 riders took part.

One of the favourites for the title, Ellen van Dijk, was not able to participate because she had not recovered from an illness.

== Teams ==
Fifteen teams competed in the 2014 Ladies Tour of Qatar. These included twelve UCI Women's Teams and three national teams.

UCI teams

- (Netherlands) Boels–Dolmans
- (Russia) RusVelo
- (Italy) Alé–Cipollini
- (Netherlands) Rabobank-Liv Woman Cycling Team
- (Netherlands) Team Giant–Shimano
- China Chongming–Giant Pro Cycling
- (United Kingdom) Wiggle–Honda
- (Italy) Astana BePink
- (Denmark) Hitec Products UCK
- (Australia) Orica–AIS
- (United States) Specialized–lululemon
- (Belgium) Lotto–Belisol Ladies

National teams

- France
- Italy
- Australia

== Stages ==
=== Stage 1 ===
4 February 2014 – Museum of Islamic Art to Mesaieed, 97 km (60.3 mi)

Stage 1 result

	Rider	Team	Time
1	Kirsten Wild (NED)	Team Giant–Shimano	2h 09' 56"
2	Shelley Olds (USA)	Alé–Cipollini	s.t.
3	Chloe Hosking (AUS)	Hitec Products UCK	s.t.
4	Jolien D'Hoore (BEL)	Lotto–Belisol Ladies	s.t.
5	Lizzie Armitstead (GBR)	Boels–Dolmans	s.t.
6	Pascale Jeuland (FRA)	France (national team)	s.t.
7	Barbara Guarischi (ITA)	Alé–Cipollini	s.t.
8	Melissa Hoskins (AUS)	Orica–AIS	s.t.
9	Iris Slappendel (NED)	Rabobank-Liv Woman Cycling Team	s.t.
10	Trixi Worrack (GER)	Specialized–lululemon	s.t.

General Classification after Stage 1

	Rider	Team	Time
1	Kirsten Wild (NED)	Team Giant–Shimano	2h 09' 40"
2	Shelley Olds (USA)	Alé–Cipollini	+ 8"
3	Chloe Hosking (AUS)	Hitec Products UCK	+ 11"
4	Lizzie Armitstead (GBR)	Boels–Dolmans	+ 14"
5	Melissa Hoskins (AUS)	Orica–AIS	+ 15"
6	Jolien D'Hoore (BEL)	Lotto–Belisol Ladies	+ 16"
7	Pascale Jeuland (FRA)	France (national team)	+ 16"
8	Barbara Guarischi (ITA)	Alé–Cipollini	+ 16"
9	Iris Slappendel (NED)	Rabobank-Liv Woman Cycling Team	+ 16"
10	Trixi Worrack (GER)	Specialized–lululemon	+ 16"

=== Stage 2 ===
5 February 2014 – Al Zubarah to Shamal City, 112.5 km (69.9 mi)

Stage 2 result

	Rider	Team	Time
1	Amy Pieters (NED)	Team Giant–Shimano	2h 53' 33"
2	Anna van der Breggen (NED)	Rabobank-Liv Woman Cycling Team	+ 3"
3	Charlotte Becker (GER)	Wiggle–Honda	+ 3"
4	Inga Čilvinaitė (LTU)	RusVelo	+ 6"
5	Kirsten Wild (NED)	Team Giant–Shimano	+ 27"
6	Chloe Hosking (AUS)	Hitec Products UCK	+ 27"
7	Emma Johansson (SWE)	Orica–AIS	+ 27"
8	Olga Zabelinskaya (RUS)	RusVelo	+ 27"
9	Jolien D'Hoore (BEL)	Lotto–Belisol Ladies	+ 31"
10	Melissa Hoskins (AUS)	Orica–AIS	+ 31"

General Classification after Stage 2

	Rider	Team	Time
1	Amy Pieters (NED)	Team Giant–Shimano	5h 03' 28"
2	Kirsten Wild (NED)	Team Giant–Shimano	+ 7"
3	Chloe Hosking (AUS)	Hitec Products UCK	+ 18"
4	Emma Johansson (SWE)	Orica–AIS	+ 28"
5	Jolien D'Hoore (BEL)	Lotto–Belisol Ladies	+ 30"
6	Melissa Hoskins (AUS)	Orica–AIS	+ 31"
7	Iris Slappendel (NED)	Rabobank-Liv Woman Cycling Team	+ 38"
8	Valentina Scandolara (ITA)	Orica–AIS	+ 38"
9	Christine Majerus (LUX)	Boels–Dolmans	+ 38"
10	Trixi Worrack (GER)	Specialized–lululemon	+ 38"

=== Stage 3 ===
6 February 2014 – Katara Cultural Village to Al Khor Corniche, 93.5 km (58.1 mi)

Stage 3 result

	Rider	Team	Time
1	Kirsten Wild (NED)	Team Giant–Shimano	2h 27' 34"
2	Lizzie Armitstead (GBR)	Boels–Dolmans	s.t.
3	Chloe Hosking (AUS)	Hitec Products UCK	s.t.
4	Shelley Olds (USA)	Alé–Cipollini	s.t.
5	Emma Johansson (SWE)	Orica–AIS	s.t.
6	Barbara Guarischi (ITA)	Alé–Cipollini	s.t.
7	Trixi Worrack (GER)	Specialized–lululemon	s.t.
8	Elena Cecchini (ITA)	Italy (national team)	s.t.
9	Amy Pieters (NED)	Team Giant–Shimano	s.t.
10	Loes Gunnewijk (NED)	Orica–AIS	s.t.

General Classification after Stage 3

	Rider	Team	Time
1	Kirsten Wild (NED)	Team Giant–Shimano	7h 30' 53"
2	Amy Pieters (NED)	Team Giant–Shimano	+ 9"
3	Chloe Hosking (AUS)	Hitec Products UCK	+ 21"
4	Emma Johansson (SWE)	Orica–AIS	+ 35"
5	Trixi Worrack (GER)	Specialized–lululemon	+ 47"
6	Melissa Hoskins (AUS)	Orica–AIS	+ 55"
7	Jolien D'Hoore (BEL)	Lotto–Belisol Ladies	+ 1' 29"
8	Elena Cecchini (ITA)	Italy (national team)	+ 1' 40"
9	Tiffany Cromwell (AUS)	Specialized–lululemon	+ 1' 48"
10	Iris Slappendel (NED)	Rabobank-Liv Woman Cycling Team	+ 2' 05"

=== Stage 4 ===
7 February 2014 – Sealine Beach Resort to Doha Corniche, 85 km (52.8 mi)

Stage 4 result

	Rider	Team	Time
1	Kirsten Wild (NED)	Team Giant–Shimano	2h 06' 23"
2	Giorgia Bronzini (ITA)	Wiggle–Honda	s.t.
3	Melissa Hoskins (AUS)	Orica–AIS	s.t.
4	Trixi Worrack (GER)	Specialized–lululemon	s.t.
5	Jolien D'Hoore (BEL)	Lotto–Belisol Ladies	s.t.
6	Shelley Olds (USA)	Alé–Cipollini	s.t.
7	Pascale Jeuland (FRA)	France (national team)	s.t.
8	Roxane Fournier (FRA)	France (national team)	s.t.
9	Lizzie Armitstead (GBR)	Boels–Dolmans	s.t.
10	Luo Xiaoling (CHN)	China Chongming–Giant Pro Cycling	s.t.

Final General Classification

	Rider	Team	Time
1	Kirsten Wild (NED)	Team Giant–Shimano	9h 37' 01"
2	Amy Pieters (NED)	Team Giant–Shimano	+ 22"
3	Chloe Hosking (AUS)	Hitec Products UCK	+ 36"
4	Emma Johansson (SWE)	Orica–AIS	+ 50"
5	Trixi Worrack (GER)	Specialized–lululemon	+ 1' 02"
6	Melissa Hoskins (AUS)	Orica–AIS	+ 1' 06"
7	Jolien D'Hoore (BEL)	Lotto–Belisol Ladies	+ 1' 44"
8	Elena Cecchini (ITA)	Italy (national team)	+ 1' 55"
9	Tiffany Cromwell (AUS)	Specialized–lululemon	+ 2' 03"
10	Iris Slappendel (NED)	Rabobank-Liv Woman Cycling Team	+ 2' 31"

== Classification leadership table ==
Stage	Winner	General classification	Points classification	Young rider classification	Teams classification
1	Kirsten Wild	Kirsten Wild	Kirsten Wild	Melissa Hoskins	Orica–AIS
2	Amy Pieters	Amy Pieters	Kirsten Wild	Amy Pieters	Orica–AIS
3	Kirsten Wild	Kirsten Wild	Kirsten Wild	Amy Pieters	Orica–AIS
4	Kirsten Wild	Kirsten Wild	Kirsten Wild	Amy Pieters	Orica–AIS
Final		Kirsten Wild	Kirsten Wild	Amy Pieters	Orica–AIS

== See also ==
- 2014 in women's road cycling
