= 2014 Sparkassen Giro =

2014 UCI Women's Road World Cup, race 6 of 9

Race details
- Dates: 3 August 2014
- Stages: 1
- Winning time: 2h 59' 48"

Results
	Winner	Marianne Vos (NED)	(Rabobank-Liv Woman Cycling Team)
	Second	Giorgia Bronzini (ITA)	(Wiggle–Honda)
	Third	Lotta Henttala (FIN)	(Bigla Cycling Team)

The 2014 Sparkassen Giro was a women's bicycle race in Germany. It was the fifth race of the 2014 UCI Women's Road World Cup season and was held on 3 August 2014. The race covered several laps through the city of Bochum. It was the 14th time the women's race was held and the first time that it was part of the Women's Road World Cup.

== Results ==
Result
Rank	Rider	Team	Time
1	Marianne Vos (NED)	Rabobank-Liv Woman Cycling Team	2h 59' 48"
2	Giorgia Bronzini (ITA)	Wiggle–Honda	+ 0"
3	Lotta Henttala (FIN)	Bigla Cycling Team	+ 0"
4	Jolien D'Hoore (BEL)	Lotto–Belisol Ladies	+ 0"
5	Lisa Brennauer (GER)	Specialized–lululemon	+ 0"
6	Christine Majerus (LUX)	Boels–Dolmans	+ 0"
7	Kelly Druyts (BEL)	Topsport Vlaanderen–Pro-Duo	+ 0"
8	Emma Johansson (SWE)	Orica–AIS	+ 0"
9	Kirsten Wild (NED)	Giant–Shimano	+ 0"
10	Shelley Olds (USA)	Alé–Cipollini	+ 0"

== World Cup standings ==
Standings after 6 of 9 2014 UCI Women's Road World Cup races.

=== Individuals ===
	Cyclist	Team	World Cup points
1	Lizzie Armitstead (GBR)	Boels–Dolmans	420
2	Emma Johansson (SWE)	Orica–AIS	295
3	Ellen van Dijk (NED)	Boels–Dolmans	240
4	Anna van der Breggen (NED)	Rabobank-Liv Woman Cycling Team	238
5	Giorgia Bronzini (ITA)	Wiggle–Honda	225
6	Kirsten Wild (NED)	Giant–Shimano	216
7	Elisa Longo Borghini (ITA)	Hitec Products	215
8	Pauline Ferrand-Prévot (FRA)	Rabobank-Liv Woman Cycling Team	200
9	Marianne Vos (NED)	Rabobank-Liv Woman Cycling Team	170
10	Shelley Olds (USA)	Alé Cipollini	160

Team: Rabobank-Liv Woman Cycling Team
Mountain: Alena Amialiusik
Sprint: Iris Slappendel
Youth: Elena Cecchini
