= Ronde van Gelderland =

Dutch one-day road cycling race

Race details
- Date: April/May
- Region: Netherlands
- Discipline: Road

History
- First edition: 2003
- Editions: 14
- Final edition: 2016
- First winner: Yvonne Troost-Brunen (NED)
- Most wins: Kirsten Wild (NED) (4 wins)
- Final winner: Katarzyna Niewiadoma (POL)

The Ronde van Gelderland (English: Tour of Gelderland) was an elite women's road bicycle race held in the Netherlands between 2003 and 2016. It was rated by the UCI as a 1.2 category race, and was primarily centred around Apeldoorn. The race was originally only for men. In August 1957 the first Ronde van Gelderland was held, with the last men's race being held in 2003.

== Past winners ==
Year	Country	Rider	Team
2003	Netherlands	Yvonne Troost-Brunen	
2004	Netherlands	Leontien Zijlaard-van Moorsel	
2005	Netherlands	Suzanne de Goede	
2006	Netherlands	Bertine Spijkerman	Therme Skin Care
2007	Netherlands	Marianne Vos	Team DSB Bank
2008	Canada	Anne Samplonius	Canada (national team)
2009	Germany	Ina-Yoko Teutenberg	Team Columbia–High Road Women
2010	Netherlands	Kirsten Wild	Cervélo TestTeam
2011	Germany	Ina-Yoko Teutenberg	HTC–Highroad Women
2012	Netherlands	Suzanne de Goede	Skil 1t4i
2013	Netherlands	Kirsten Wild	Argos–Shimano
2014	Netherlands	Kirsten Wild	Giant–Shimano
2015	Netherlands	Kirsten Wild	Team Hitec Products
2016	Poland	Katarzyna Niewiadoma	Rabobank-Liv Woman Cycling Team
