= 2014 Tour of Chongming Island =

Race details
- Dates: 14–16 May
- Stages: 3
- Distance: 316.1 km (196.4 mi)
- Winning time: 7h 50' 37"

Results
Jersey awarded to the overall winner	Winner	Kirsten Wild (NED)	(Giant–Shimano)
	Second	Shelley Olds (USA)	(Alé–Cipollini)
	Third	Giorgia Bronzini (ITA)	(Wiggle–Honda)
Jersey awarded to the points classification winner	Points	Kirsten Wild (NED)	(Giant–Shimano)

The 2014 Tour of Chongming Island was a stage race held in China, with a UCI rating of 2.1. It was the tenth stage race of the 2014 Women's Elite cycling calendar.

== Stages ==
=== Stage 1 ===
14 May 2014 — Chongming to Qidong, 121.6 km (75.6 mi)

Stage 1 result

	Rider	Team	Time
1	Kirsten Wild (NED)	Team Giant–Shimano	3h 05' 40"
2	Roxane Fournier (FRA)	France (national team)	s.t.
3	Shelley Olds (USA)	Alé–Cipollini	s.t.
4	Annalisa Cucinotta (ITA)	Servetto Footon	s.t.
5	Giorgia Bronzini (ITA)	Wiggle–Honda	s.t.
6	Barbara Guarischi (ITA)	Alé–Cipollini	s.t.
7	Emilie Moberg (NOR)	Hitec Products	s.t.
8	Inga Čilvinaitė (LTU)	RusVelo	s.t.
9	Pascale Jeuland (FRA)	France (national team)	s.t.
10	Elena Cecchini (ITA)	Estado de México–Faren Kuota	s.t.

General Classification after Stage 1

	Rider	Team	Time
1	Kirsten Wild (NED)	Team Giant–Shimano	3h 05' 24"
2	Shelley Olds (USA)	Alé–Cipollini	+ 9"
3	Roxane Fournier (FRA)	France (national team)	+ 10"
4	Elena Cecchini (ITA)	Estado de México–Faren Kuota	+ 13"
5	Annalisa Cucinotta (ITA)	Servetto Footon	+ 16"
6	Giorgia Bronzini (ITA)	Wiggle–Honda	+ 16"
7	Barbara Guarischi (ITA)	Alé–Cipollini	+ 16"
8	Emilie Moberg (NOR)	Hitec Products	+ 16"
9	Inga Čilvinaitė (LTU)	RusVelo	+ 16"
10	Pascale Jeuland (FRA)	France (national team)	+ 16"

=== Stage 2 ===
15 May 2014 — Chongxi to Chongxi, 113.7 km (70.6 mi)

Stage 2 result

	Rider	Team	Time
1	Kirsten Wild (NED)	Team Giant–Shimano	2h 48' 49"
2	Giorgia Bronzini (ITA)	Wiggle–Honda	s.t.
3	Shelley Olds (USA)	Alé–Cipollini	s.t.
4	Nina Kessler (NED)	Boels–Dolmans	s.t.
5	Fiona Dutriaux (FRA)	France (national team)	s.t.
6	Kim de Baat (NED)	Parkhotel Valkenburg	s.t.
7	Pascale Jeuland (FRA)	France (national team)	s.t.
8	Aurore Verhoeven (FRA)	Lointek	s.t.
9	Aizhan Zhaparova (FRA)	RusVelo	s.t.
10	Rochelle Gilmore (AUS)	Wiggle–Honda	s.t.

General Classification after Stage 2

	Rider	Team	Time
1	Kirsten Wild (NED)	Team Giant–Shimano	5h 54' 00"
2	Shelley Olds (USA)	Alé–Cipollini	+ 15"
3	Giorgia Bronzini (ITA)	Wiggle–Honda	+ 23"
4	Roxane Fournier (FRA)	France (national team)	+ 23"
5	Elena Cecchini (ITA)	Estado de México–Faren Kuota	+ 26"
6	Charlotte Becker (GER)	Wiggle–Honda	+ 26"
7	Inga Čilvinaitė (LTU)	RusVelo	+ 27"
8	Barbara Guarischi (ITA)	Alé–Cipollini	+ 28"
9	Pascale Jeuland (FRA)	France (national team)	+ 29"
10	Annalisa Cucinotta (ITA)	Servetto Footon	+ 29"

=== Stage 3 ===
16 May 2014 — Chongming to Chongming, 80.8 km (50.2 mi)

Stage 3 result

	Rider	Team	Time
1	Giorgia Bronzini (ITA)	Wiggle–Honda	1h 56' 46"
2	Kirsten Wild (NED)	Team Giant–Shimano	s.t.
3	Shelley Olds (USA)	Alé–Cipollini	s.t.
4	Elena Cecchini (ITA)	Estado de México–Faren Kuota	s.t.
5	Charlotte Becker (GER)	Wiggle–Honda	s.t.
6	Barbara Guarischi (ITA)	Alé–Cipollini	s.t.
7	Emilie Moberg (NOR)	Hitec Products	s.t.
8	Annalisa Cucinotta (ITA)	Servetto Footon	s.t.
9	Maria Giulia Confalonieri (ITA)	Estado de México–Faren Kuota	s.t.
10	Roxane Fournier (FRA)	France (national team)	s.t.

Final General Classification

	Rider	Team	Time
1	Kirsten Wild (NED)	Team Giant–Shimano	7h 50' 37"
2	Shelley Olds (USA)	Alé–Cipollini	+ 18"
3	Giorgia Bronzini (ITA)	Wiggle–Honda	+ 22"
4	Roxane Fournier (FRA)	France (national team)	+ 32"
5	Barbara Guarischi (ITA)	Alé–Cipollini	+ 34"
6	Elena Cecchini (ITA)	Estado de México–Faren Kuota	+ 34"
7	Charlotte Becker (GER)	Wiggle–Honda	+ 35"
8	Emilie Moberg (NOR)	Hitec Products	+ 36"
9	Marta Tagliaferro (ITA)	Alé–Cipollini	+ 37"
10	Annalisa Cucinotta (ITA)	Servetto Footon	+ 38"

== Classification leadership table ==
Stage	Winner	General classification	Points classification
1	Kirsten Wild	Kirsten Wild	Kirsten Wild
2	Kirsten Wild	Kirsten Wild	Kirsten Wild
3	Giorgia Bronzini	Kirsten Wild	Kirsten Wild
Final		Kirsten Wild	Kirsten Wild
