= 2017 Healthy Ageing Tour =

Race details
- Dates: 5–9 April 2017
- Stages: 5 (including 1 split-stage)
- Distance: 512.7 km (318.6 mi)

Results
Jersey awarded to the overall winner	Winner	Ellen van Dijk (NED)	(Team Sunweb)
	Second	Anna van der Breggen (NED)	(Boels–Dolmans)
	Third	Lisa Brennauer (GER)	(Canyon–SRAM)
Jersey awarded to the points classification winner	Points	Ellen van Dijk (NED)	(Team Sunweb)
Jersey awarded to the youth classification winner	Youth	Lisa Klein (GER)	(Cervélo–Bigla Pro Cycling)
Jersey awarded to the sprints classification winner	Sprints	Barbara Guarischi (ITA)	(Canyon–SRAM)

The 2017 Healthy Ageing Tour was a women's cycle stage race that is being held in the Netherlands from 4 to 8 April 2018. The 2017 edition of the race was the seventh running of the Healthy Ageing Tour, being held with a UCI rating of 2.1.

== Route ==
Stage schedule
Stage	Date	Route	Distance	Type	Winner
1a	5 April	Leek to Leek	16.9 km (10.5 mi)	Individual time trial	Ellen van Dijk (NED)
1b	5 April	Grijpskerk to Grijpskerk	77.6 km (48.2 mi)	Flat stage	Amy Pieters (NED)
2	6 April	Baflo to Baflo	19.3 km (12.0 mi)	Team time trial	Boels–Dolmans
3	7 April	Musselkanaal to Stadskanaal	154.4 km (95.9 mi)	Flat stage	Lisa Brennauer (GER)
4	8 April	Finsterwolde to Finsterwolde	126.6 km (78.7 mi)	Flat stage	Chantal Blaak (NED)
5	9 April	Borkum to Borkum	117.9 km (73.3 mi)	Flat stage	Emilie Moberg (NOR)

== Classification leadership table ==
In the 2017 Healthy Ageing Tour, six different jerseys were awarded. For the general classification, calculated by adding each cyclist's finishing times on each stage, and allowing time bonuses for the first three finishers at intermediate sprints and at the finish of mass-start stages, the leader received a yellow jersey. This classification was considered the most important of the 2018 Healthy Ageing Tour, and the winner of the classification was considered the winner of the race.

Additionally, there was a points classification, which awarded a green jersey. In the points classification, cyclists received points for finishing in the top 15 in a stage. For winning a stage, a rider earned 25 points, with 20 for second, 16 for third, 14 for fourth, 12 for fifth, 10 for sixth with a point fewer per place down to a single point for 15th place. The third classification was the sprints classification, the leader of which was awarded an orange jersey. In the sprints classification, riders received points for finishing in the top three at intermediate sprint points during each stage.

The fourth jersey represented the young rider classification, marked by a white jersey. This was decided in the same way as the general classification, but only riders born after 1 January 1996 were eligible to be ranked in the classification. Other jerseys were awarded to the best club rider amongst the amateur riders (blue), and for the most courageous rider showing fighting spirit (purple). There was also a classification for teams, in which the times of the best three cyclists per team on each stage were added together; the leading team at the end of the race was the team with the lowest total time.

Stage	Winner	General classification	Points classification	Sprints classification	Young rider classification	Combativity classification	Club rider classification	Team classification
1a	Ellen van Dijk	Ellen van Dijk	Ellen van Dijk	Not awarded (Note: Jersey worn by Lisa Brennauer in the second stage, but no points were awarded in the individual time trial.)	Lisa Klein	Stephanie Pohl	Nicole Steigenga	Boels–Dolmans
1b	Amy Pieters	Ellen van Dijk	Ellen van Dijk	Anna van der Breggen	Lisa Klein	Alice Barnes	Marjolein van 't Geloof	Boels–Dolmans
2	Boels–Dolmans	Ellen van Dijk	Ellen van Dijk	Anna van der Breggen	Lisa Klein	Alice Barnes	Marjolein van 't Geloof	Boels–Dolmans
3	Lisa Brennauer	Ellen van Dijk	Ellen van Dijk	Christina Sigaard	Lisa Klein	Nicole Steigenga	Marjolein van 't Geloof	Boels–Dolmans
4	Chantal Blaak	Ellen van Dijk	Ellen van Dijk	Christina Sigaard	Lisa Klein	Daiva Tušlaitė	Marjolein van 't Geloof	Boels–Dolmans
5	Emilie Moberg	Ellen van Dijk	Ellen van Dijk	Barbara Guarischi	Lisa Klein	Roxane Knetemann	Marjolein van 't Geloof	Team Sunweb
Final		Ellen van Dijk	Ellen van Dijk	Barbara Guarischi	Lisa Klein	Roxane Knetemann	Marjolein van 't Geloof	Team Sunweb

== See also ==
- 2017 in women's road cycling
