= 2015 Sparkassen Giro =

2015 UCI Women's Road World Cup, race 7 of 10

Race details
- Dates: 2 August 2015
- Stages: 1
- Distance: 124 km (77 mi)
- Winning time: 3h 04' 19"

Results
	Winner	Barbara Guarischi (ITA)	(Velocio–SRAM)
	Second	Lucinda Brand (NED)	(Rabobank-Liv Woman Cycling Team)
	Third	Emilie Moberg (NOR)	(Team Hitec Products)

The 2015 Sparkassen Giro featured as the seventh round of the 2015 UCI Women's Road World Cup. It was held on 2 August 2015, in Bochum, Germany. Barbara Guarischi (Velocio–SRAM) won, beating Lucinda Brand (Rabobank-Liv Woman Cycling Team) and Emilie Moberg (Team Hitec Products).

== Results ==
Result
Rank	Rider	Team	Time
1	Barbara Guarischi (ITA)	Velocio–SRAM	3h 04' 19"
2	Lucinda Brand (NED)	Rabo–Liv	+ 0"
3	Emilie Moberg (NOR)	Team Hitec Products	+ 0"
4	Lotta Lepistö (FIN)	Bigla Pro Cycling Team	+ 0"
5	Elena Cecchini (ITA)	Lotto–Soudal Ladies	+ 0"
6	Christine Majerus (LUX)	Boels–Dolmans	+ 0"
7	Marta Bastianelli (ITA)	Aromitalia Vaiano	+ 0"
8	Jolien D'Hoore (BEL)	Wiggle–Honda	+ 0"
9	Lizzie Williams (AUS)	Orica–GreenEDGE	+ 0"
10	Anna Trevisi (ITA)	Inpa Sottoli Giusfredi	+ 0"
Source: ProCyclingStats

== World Cup Standings ==
Individual ranking after 7 of 10 World Cup races
Rank	Rider	Team	Points
1	Lizzie Armitstead (GBR)	Boels–Dolmans	335
2	Elisa Longo Borghini (ITA)	Wiggle–Honda	296
3	Anna van der Breggen (NED)	Rabo–Liv	290
4	Jolien D'Hoore (BEL)	Wiggle–Honda	255
5	Annemiek van Vleuten (NED)	Bigla Pro Cycling Team	226
6	Alena Amialiusik (BLR)	Velocio–SRAM	225
7	Lucinda Brand (NED)	Rabo–Liv	192
8	Elena Cecchini (ITA)	Lotto–Soudal Ladies	182
9	Pauline Ferrand-Prévot (FRA)	Rabo–Liv	175
10	Barbara Guarischi (ITA)	Velocio–SRAM	145
Source: Union Cycliste Internationale
