= Julia Soek =

Dutch cyclist

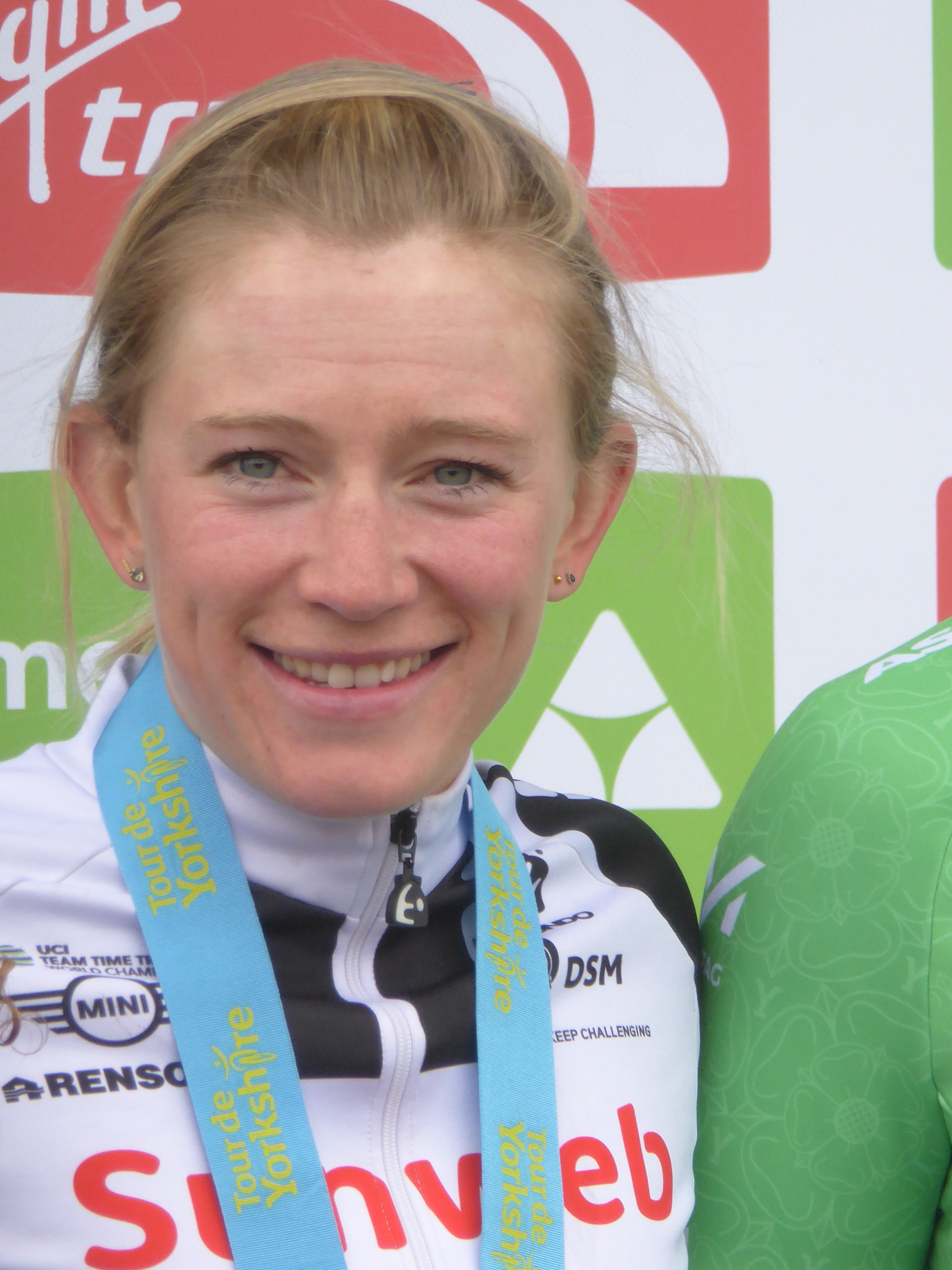
- Soek at the 2018 Women's Tour de Yorkshire

Personal information
- Full name: Julia Soek
- Born: 12 December 1990 (age 35) Groningen, Netherlands

Cycling career
- Sport: Cycling
- Current team: Unibet Rose Rockets
- Discipline: Road
- Role: Rider; Directeur sportif
- Rider type: Lead out Road captain

Amateur teams
- 2010–2011: Batavus Ladies Cycling Team
- 2012: Specialized DPD SRAM Cycling Team

Professional teams
- 2013: Sengers Ladies Cycling Team
- 2014–2021: Giant–Shimano

Managerial teams
- 2022: Le Col–Wahoo
- 2023–: TDT–Unibet Cycling Team

Julia Soek (born 12 December 1990) is a Dutch former racing cyclist, who last rode for UCI Women's WorldTeam Team DSM. She competed in the 2013 UCI women's team time trial in Florence. In September 2021 Soek announced that she would retire from competition at the end of the season. The following month it emerged that she would join Drops–Le Col as a directeur sportif for 2022. In the same year she followed a directeur sportif course at the World Cycling Centre in Switzerland. In 2023 she joined the new Dutch UCI Continental team TDT–Unibet Cycling Team as directeur sportif, and took over the role of head sports director the following year.

== Major results ==
2015
1st Sprints classification Energiewacht Tour
2016
8th Crescent Vårgårda UCI Women's WorldTour
2017
1st Erondegemse Pijl
2018
1st Stage 1 (TTT) Giro Rosa

== See also ==
- 2014 Team Giant-Shimano season
