= Emilie Moberg =

Norwegian racing cyclist

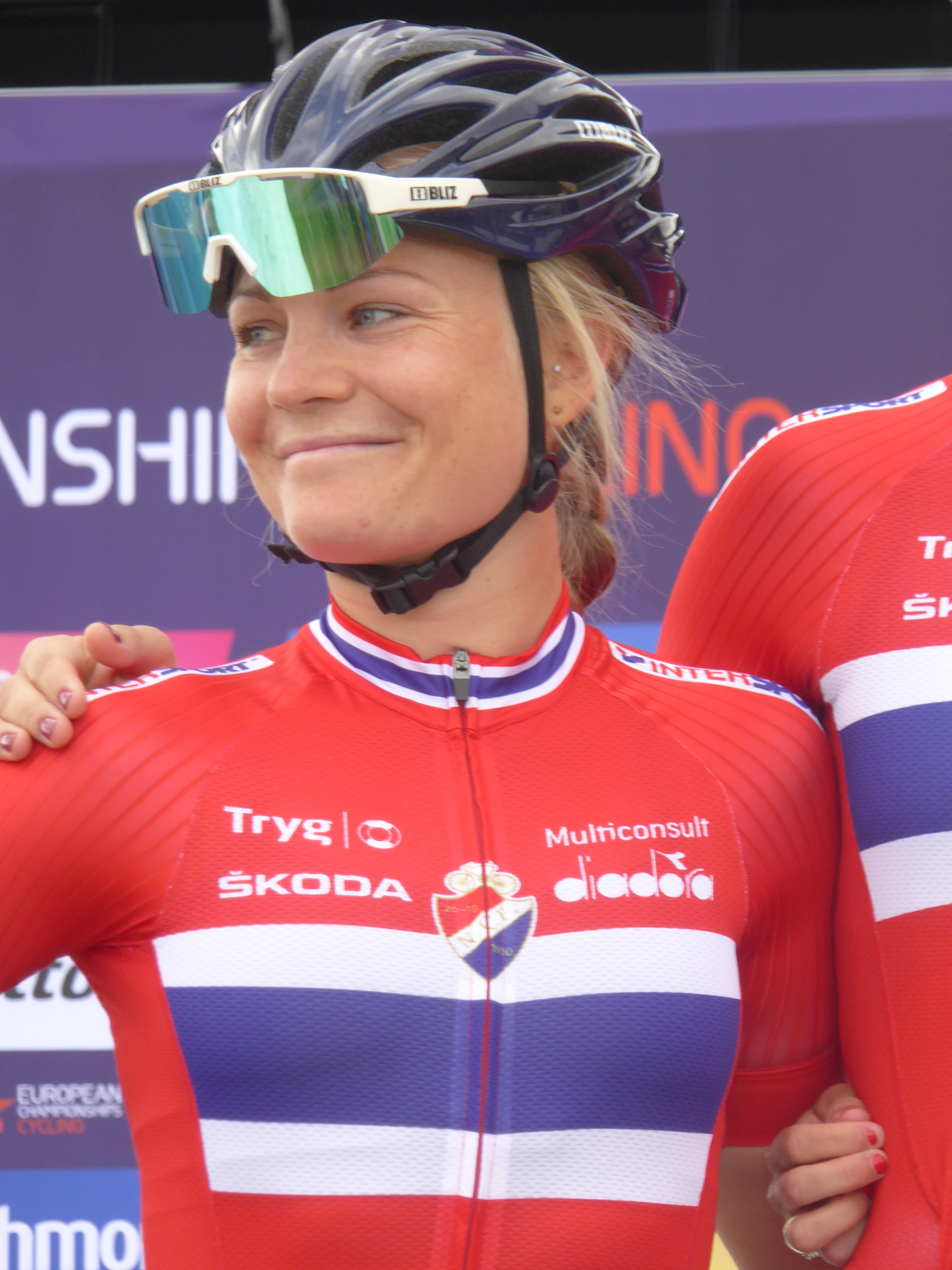
- Moberg at the 2018 European Road Cycling Championships.

Personal information
- Full name: Emilie Moberg
- Born: 12 July 1991 (age 35) Halden, Norway

Cycling career
- Sport: Cycling
- Discipline: Road
- Role: Rider

Amateur team
- Halden CK

Professional teams
- 2010–2017: Hitec Products UCK
- 2018–2019: Team Virtu Cycling
- 2020–2021: Drops
- 2022: Le Col–Wahoo

Emilie Moberg (born 12 July 1991) is a Norwegian road bicycle racer, who rode for UCI Women's Continental Team Le Col–Wahoo.

She is a former Norwegian national champion in winter triathlon. She also competed at the 2012 Summer Olympics in the Women's road race, but finished over the time limit.

== Major results ==
2008
1st Overall Smaalenene Skoda Petit Prix
2nd Overall Tønsberg 4-dagers
2nd Overall Grenland GP
2nd Overall Kalas Cup/Norgescup Eidsvollrittet
2nd Overall Trønderfestivalen
2nd Criterium, National Junior Road Championships
2nd Cross-country, National Junior Mountain Bike Championships
National Junior Track Championships

3rd 500m time trial
3rd Individual pursuit

2009
1st Overall Grenland GP

1st Stages 1 & 2

2nd Overall Kalas Cup/Norgescup Eidsvollrittet

1st Stage 3

National Junior Road Championships

3rd Road race
3rd Time trial

2011
National Road Championships

1st Criterium
2nd Road race

1st Stage 5 Trophée d'Or Féminin
1st Stage 2 Tour Cycliste Féminin International de l'Ardèche
7th Open de Suède Vårgårda TTT
2012
National Road Championships

1st Criterium
7th Road race

1st Overall Tour of Zhoushan Island I

1st Stage 1

3rd Cholet Pays de Loire Dames
7th Overall Tour of Chongming Island
8th Team time trial, UCI Road World Championships
9th Open de Suède Vårgårda TTT
10th Erondegemse Pijl
2013
3rd Road race, National Road Championships
2014
4th Tour of Chongming Island World Cup
National Road Championships

7th Time trial
9th Road race

8th Overall Tour of Chongming Island
9th Team time trial, UCI Road World Championships
9th Open de Suède Vårgårda TTT
2015
Tour de Feminin-O cenu Českého Švýcarska

1st Stages 2 & 4

3rd Sparkassen Giro
4th Road race, National Road Championships
4th Acht van Westerveld
9th Crescent Women World Cup Vårgårda TTT
10th Team time trial, UCI Road World Championships
2016
5th Road race, National Road Championships
5th Overall Ladies Tour of Norway
6th Team time trial, UCI Road World Championships
8th Overall Tour of Chongming Island
10th Madrid Challenge by La Vuelta
2017
1st Stage 5 Healthy Ageing Tour
3rd Overall Tour of Zhoushan Island

1st Points classification
1st Stages 1 & 3

6th Time trial, National Road Championships
7th Overall Tour of Chongming Island
2019
1st Stage 2 Tour of Uppsala
9th Overall Belgium Tour
2020
3rd Road race, National Road Championships
2021
4th Scheldeprijs
