= 2013 Belgium Tour =

2013 Lotto-Belisol Belgium Tour
- Poster of the event featuring Ellen van Dijk

Race details
- Dates: 23–26 August 2013
- Stages: 4
- Distance: 332.5 km (206.6 mi)
- Winning time: 8h 26' 51"

Results
Jersey awarded to the overall winner	Winner	Ellen van Dijk (NED)	(Specialized–lululemon)
	Second	Lisa Brennauer (GER)	(Specialized–lululemon)
	Third	Emma Johansson (SWE)	(Orica–AIS)
Jersey awarded to the mountains classification winner	Mountains	Sofie De Vuyst (BEL)	(Sengers Ladies Cycling Team)
Jersey awarded to the youth classification winner	Youth	Amy Pieters (NED)	(Argos–Shimano)
Jersey awarded to the sprints classification winner	Sprints	Jasmin Glaesser (AUS)	(Team TIBCO-To The Top)
	Team	Specialized–lululemon	

Promo Stage 1 Stage 2 Stage 3 Stage 4

The 2013 Lotto-Belisol Belgium Tour is the second edition of the Lotto-Belisol Belgium Tour, previous called Lotto-Decca Tour, a women's cycle stage race in Belgium. The tour will be held from 23 to 26 August 2013. The tour has an UCI rating of 2.2.

== Stages ==
=== Stage 1 ===
23-08-2013 – Warquignies to Angreau, 19.75 km (12.3 mi) Team time trial (TTT)

Stage 1 Result

	Team	Time
1	Specialized–lululemon; Ellen van Dijk (NED); Evelyn Stevens (USA); Lisa Brennauer (GER); Trixi Worrack (GER); Carmen Small (USA); Loren Rowney (AUS); Tayler Wiles (USA)	25' 39"
2	Orica–AIS	+ 35"
3	Team TIBCO-To The Top	+ 1' 22"
4	Hitec Products UCK	+ 1' 29"
5	Argos–Shimano	+ 1' 31"

General Classification after Stage 1

	Rider	Team	Time
1	Ellen van Dijk (NED)	Specialized–lululemon	25' 39"
2	Lisa Brennauer (GER)	Specialized–lululemon	+ 0"
3	Carmen Small (USA)	Specialized–lululemon	+ 0"
4	Trixi Worrack (GER)	Specialized–lululemon	+ 0"
5	Evelyn Stevens (USA)	Specialized–lululemon	+ 0"

=== Stage 2 ===
24-08-2013 – Angreau to Angreau, 110.16 km (68.5 mi)

Stage 2 Result

	Rider	Team	Time
1	Kirsten Wild (NED)	Argos–Shimano	2h 55' 48"
2	Emma Johansson (SWE)	Orica–AIS	s.t.
3	Rossella Ratto (ITA)	Hitec Products UCK	s.t.
4	Kelly Druyts (BEL)	Topsport Vlaanderen-Bioracer	s.t.
5	Ellen van Dijk (NED)	Specialized–lululemon	s.t.

General Classification after Stage 2

	Rider	Team	Time
1	Ellen van Dijk (NED)	Specialized–lululemon	3h 21' 27"
2	Lisa Brennauer (GER)	Specialized–lululemon	+ 0"
3	Carmen Small (USA)	Specialized–lululemon	+ 20"
4	Emma Johansson (SWE)	Orica–AIS	+ 29"
5	Loes Gunnewijk (NED)	Orica–AIS	+ 35"

=== Stage 3 ===
25-08-2013 – Nijlen to Nijlen, 115.12 km (71.5 mi)

Stage 3 Result

	Rider	Team	Time
1	Kirsten Wild (NED)	Argos–Shimano	2h 45' 23"
2	Lisa Brennauer (GER)	Specialized–lululemon	s.t.
3	Annette Edmondson (AUS)	Orica–AIS	s.t.
4	Kelly Druyts (BEL)	Topsport Vlaanderen-Bioracer	s.t.
5	Shelley Olds (USA)	Team TIBCO-To The Top	s.t.

General Classification after Stage 3

	Rider	Team	Time
1	Lisa Brennauer (GER)	Specialized–lululemon	6h 06' 44"
2	Ellen van Dijk (NED)	Specialized–lululemon	+ 6"
3	Carmen Small (USA)	Specialized–lululemon	+ 26"
4	Emma Johansson (SWE)	Orica–AIS	+ 35"
5	Loes Gunnewijk (NED)	Orica–AIS	+ 41"

=== Stage 4 ===
26-08-2013 – Geraardsbergen to Geraardsbergen, 87.47 km (54.4 mi)

Stage 4 Result

	Rider	Team	Time
1	Annette Edmondson (AUS)	Orica–AIS	2h 20' 05"
2	Emma Johansson (SWE)	Orica–AIS	s.t.
3	Ellen van Dijk (NED)	Specialized–lululemon	s.t.
4	Rossella Ratto (ITA)	Hitec Products UCK	+ 3"
5	Amy Pieters (NED)	Argos–Shimano	+ 3"

General Classification after Stage 4

	Rider	Team	Time
1	Ellen van Dijk (NED)	Specialized–lululemon	+ 8h 26' 51"
2	Lisa Brennauer (GER)	Specialized–lululemon	+ 7"
3	Emma Johansson (SWE)	Orica–AIS	+ 27"
4	Loes Gunnewijk (NED)	Orica–AIS	+ 1' 05"
5	Shelley Olds (USA)	Team TIBCO-To The Top	+ 1' 29"

== Classification leadership ==
Stage	Winner	General classification	Sprints classification	Mountains classification	Young rider classification	Belgian Riders	Team classification	Combativity award
1	Specialized–lululemon	Ellen van Dijk	no award	no award	Annette Edmondson	Evelyn Arys	Specialized–lululemon	no award
2	Kirsten Wild	Ellen van Dijk	Jasmin Glaesser	Sofie De Vuyst	Jasmin Glaesser	Sofie De Vuyst	Specialized–lululemon	Élise Delzenne
3	Kirsten Wild	Lisa Brennauer	Jasmin Glaesser	Sofie De Vuyst	Jasmin Glaesser	Sofie De Vuyst	Specialized–lululemon	Marijn de Vries
4	Annette Edmondson	Ellen van Dijk	Jasmin Glaesser	Sofie De Vuyst	Amy Pieters	Sofie De Vuyst	Orica–AIS	Loes Gunnewijk
Final Classification		Ellen van Dijk	Jasmin Glaesser	Sofie De Vuyst	Amy Pieters	Sofie De Vuyst	Orica–AIS	no award

== Classification standings ==
Legend
Yellow jersey	Denotes the leader of the General classification	Green jersey	Denotes the leader of the Sprints classification
Mountains jersey	Denotes the leader of the Mountains classification	White jersey	Denotes the leader of the Young rider classification
Black jersey	Denotes the leader of the Belgian rider classification		

=== General Classification ===
Rank	Name	Team	Time
1	Ellen van Dijk (NED)	Specialized–lululemon	8h 26' 51"
2	Lisa Brennauer (GER)	Specialized–lululemon	+ 7"
3	Emma Johansson (SWE)	Orica–AIS	+ 27"
4	Loes Gunnewijk (NED)	Orica–AIS	+ 1' 05"
5	Shelley Olds (USA)	Team TIBCO-To The Top	+ 1' 29"
6	Amy Pieters (NED)	Argos–Shimano	+ 1' 38"
7	Sofie De Vuyst (BEL)	Sengers Ladies Cycling Team	+ 1' 46"
8	Rossella Ratto (ITA)	Hitec Products UCK	+ 1' 47"
9	Chantal Blaak (NED)	Team TIBCO-To The Top	+ 1' 55"
10	Céline Van Severen (BEL)	Lotto Belisol Ladies	+ 1' 57

=== Team Classification ===
Rank	Team	Time
1	Orica–AIS	24h 30' 35"
2	Team TIBCO-To The Top	+ 1' 13"
3	Lotto Belisol Ladies	+ 1' 17"
4	Specialized–lululemon	+ 1' 50"
5	Hitec Products UCK	+ 1' 59"
6	Argos–Shimano	+ 4' 15"
7	Sengers Ladies Cycling Team	+ 5' 48"
8	CyclelivePLUS-Zannata Ladies Team	+ 6' 08"
9	Topsport Vlaanderen-Bioracer	+ 6' 42"
10	Belgium national team	+ 8' 25'"

=== Sprints Classification ===
Rank	Name	Team	Points
1	Jasmin Glaesser (AUS)	Team TIBCO-To The Top	17
2	Thalita de Jong (NED)	Rabobank-Liv Giant	16
3	Marijn de Vries (NED)	Lotto Belisol Ladies	15
4	Loes Gunnewijk (NED)	Orica–AIS	10
5	Liesbet De Vocht (USA)	Belgium national team	9

=== Mountains Classification ===
Rank	Name	Team	Points
1	Sofie De Vuyst (BEL)	Sengers Ladies Cycling Team	23
2	Ellen van Dijk (NED)	Specialized–lululemon	9
3	Amy Pieters (NED)	Argos–Shimano	8
4	Céline Van Severen (BEL)	Lotto Belisol Ladies	6
5	Loes Gunnewijk (NED)	Orica–AIS	5

=== Young rider classification ===
Rank	Name	Team	Time
1	Amy Pieters (NED)	Argos–Shimano	8h 28' 29"
2	Rossella Ratto (ITA)	Hitec Products UCK	+ 9"
3	Céline Van Severen (BEL)	Lotto Belisol Ladies	+ 19"
4	Elisa Longo Borghini (ITA)	Hitec Products UCK	+ 24"
5	Annette Edmondson (AUS)	Orica–AIS	+ 57"

=== Belgian Rider Classification ===
Rank	Name	Team	Time
1	Sofie De Vuyst (BEL)	Sengers Ladies Cycling Team	8h 28' 37"
2	Evelyn Arys (BEL)	Sengers Ladies Cycling Team	+ 11"
3	Jolien D'Hoore (BEL)	Lotto Belisol Ladies	+ 27"
4	Céline Van Severen (BEL)	Lotto Belisol Ladies	+ 33"
5	Annelies Van Doorslaer (BEL)	Orica–AIS	+ 34"
