= 2014 Team Giant–Shimano season =

2014 Team Giant–Shimano
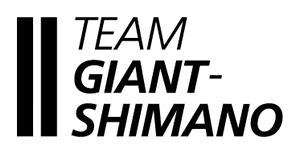
- Manager: Iwan Spekenbrink

Season victories
- One-day races: 10
- Stage race overall: 2
- Stage race stages: 8
- Best ranked rider: Kirsten Wild (4th)

The 2014 women's road cycling season was the fourth for the Team Giant–Shimano (UCI code: GIW), which began as Team Skil–Argos in 2010.

== Roster ==
As of 1 January 2014. Ages as of 1 January 2014.

Rider	Date of birth
Marijn de Vries (NED)	19 November 1978 (aged 35)
Lucy Garner (GBR)	20 September 1994 (aged 19)
Claudia Häusler (GER)	17 November 1985 (aged 28)
Willeke Knol (NED)	10 April 1991 (aged 22)
Floortje Mackaij (NED)	18 October 1995 (aged 18)

Rider	Date of birth
Sara Mustonen (SWE)	8 February 1981 (aged 32)
Maaike Polspoel (BEL)	28 March 1989 (aged 24)
Julia Soek (NED)	12 December 1990 (aged 23)
Kyara Stijns (NED)	9 October 1995 (aged 18)
Kirsten Wild (NED)	15 October 1982 (aged 31)

Riders who joined the team for the 2014 season

Rider	2013 team
Floortje Mackaij (NED)	Former junior rider, stagiair since 1 August 2013
Sara Mustonen (SWE)	
Maaike Polspoel (BEL)	Sengers Ladies Cycling Team
Julia Soek (NED)	
Kyara Stijns (NED)	Former junior rider
Marijn de Vries (NED)	Lotto–Belisol Ladies

Riders who left the team during or after the 2013 season

Rider	2014 team
Elke Gebhardt (GER)	Bigla Cycling Team
Kelly Markus (NED)	
Janneke Busser Kanis (NED)	Retiring
Esra Tromp (NED)	Parkhotel Valkenburg p/b Math Salden

== Season victories ==
Single day and stage races 2014
Date	Country	Race	Cat.	Winner
4 February	Qatar	Stage 1 Ladies Tour of Qatar	2.1	(Netherlands) Kirsten Wild
5 February	Qatar	Stage 2 Ladies Tour of Qatar	2.1	(Netherlands) Amy Pieters
6 February	Qatar	Stage 3 Ladies Tour of Qatar	2.1	(Netherlands) Kirsten Wild
7 February	Qatar	Stage 4 Ladies Tour of Qatar	2.1	(Netherlands) Kirsten Wild
7 February	Qatar	General classification Ladies Tour of Qatar	2.1	(Netherlands) Kirsten Wild
1 March	Belgium	Omloop het Nieuwsblad	1.2	(Netherlands) Amy Pieters
16 March	Netherlands	Novilon EDR Cup	1.2	(Netherlands) Kirsten Wild
9 April	Netherlands	Stage 1 Energiewacht Tour	2.2	(Netherlands) Kirsten Wild
10 April	Netherlands	Stage 2 Energiewacht Tour	2.2	(Netherlands) Kirsten Wild
20 April	Netherlands	Ronde van Gelderland	1.2	(Netherlands) Kirsten Wild
14 May	China	Stage 1 Tour of Chongming Island	1.2	(Netherlands) Kirsten Wild
15 May	China	Stage 2 Tour of Chongming Island	1.2	(Netherlands) Kirsten Wild
16 May	China	General classification Tour of Chongming Island	1.2	(Netherlands) Kirsten Wild
17 May	Belgium	Trofee Maarten Wynants	1.2	(Netherlands) Maaike Polspoel
18 May	China	Tour of Chongming Island World Cup	CDM	(Netherlands) Kirsten Wild
4 June	Netherlands	Parel van de Veluwe	Nat.	(Netherlands) Floortje Mackaij

== Results in major races ==
=== Single day races ===
Results at the 2014 UCI Women's Road World Cup races
Date	#	Race	Best rider	Place
15 March	1	Ronde van Drenthe	(Netherlands) Kirsten Wild	6th
30 March	2	Trofeo Alfredo Binda-Comune di Cittiglio	(Germany) Claudia Lichtenberg	13th
6 April	3	Tour of Flanders	(Netherlands) Kirsten Wild	13th
23 April	4	La Flèche Wallonne Féminine	(Germany) Claudia Häusler	9th
18 May	5	Tour of Chongming Island	(Netherlands) Kirsten Wild	1st
3 August	6	Sparkassen Giro	(Netherlands) Kirsten Wild	9th
22 August	7	Open de Suède Vårgårda TTT	Team Giant–Shimano	7th
24 August	8	Open de Suède Vårgårda	(Netherlands) Kirsten Wild	5th
30 August	9	GP de Plouay	(Germany) Claudia Lichtenberg	16th
Final individual classification			(Netherlands) Kirsten Wild	5th
Final team classification				

Other major single day races
Date	Race	Best rider	Place
27 July	La Course by Le Tour de France	(Netherlands) Kirsten Wild	2nd
21 September	UCI Road World Championships – Women's team time trial	Team Giant–Shimano	8th
23 September	UCI Road World Championships – Women's time trial (Note: Riders are part of the national team)		
27 September	UCI Road World Championships – Women's road race (Note: Riders are part of the national team)		

=== Grand Tours ===
Results of the team in the grand tours
Grand tour	Giro d'Italia Femminile
Rider (classification)	Claudia Häusler (6th)
Victories	0 stage wins

== UCI World Ranking ==
The 2014 UCI Women's Road Rankings are rankings based upon the results in all UCI-sanctioned races of the 2014 women's road cycling season.

Team Giant–Shimano finished fifth in the 2014 ranking for UCI teams.

Individual world ranking
Rank	Rider	Points
4	(Netherlands) Kirsten Wild	877.25
15	(Netherlands) Amy Pieters	417.5
20	(Germany) Claudia Lichtenberg	366.25
41	(United Kingdom) Lucy Garner	163
60	(Belgium) Maaike Polspoel	114.25
87	(Sweden) Sara Mustonen	69.25
166	(Netherlands) Floortje Mackaij	28.25
538	(Poland) Willeke Knol	1.25
