= 2014 Tour of Chongming Island World Cup =

2014 UCI Women's Road World Cup, race 5 of 9

Race details
- Dates: 18 May 2014
- Stages: 1
- Distance: 130 km (81 mi)
- Winning time: 3h 16' 44"

Results
	Winner	Kirsten Wild (NED)	(Giant–Shimano)
	Second	Elena Cecchini (ITA)	(Estado de México–Faren Kuota)
	Third	Giorgia Bronzini (ITA)	(Wiggle–Honda)

The 2014 Tour of Chongming Island World Cup was a women's bicycle race in China. It was the fifth race of the 2014 UCI Women's Road World Cup season and was held on 18 May 2014 over a distance of 130 kilometres (80.8 miles), starting and finishing in Chongming.

== Results ==
	Cyclist	Team	Time
1	Kirsten Wild (NED)	Giant–Shimano	3h 26' 43"
2	Lizzie Armitstead (GBR)	Estado de México–Faren Kuota	+ 1"
3	Giorgia Bronzini (ITA)	Wiggle–Honda	+ 4"
4	Emilie Moberg (NOR)	Hitec Products	+ 7"
5	Melissa Hoskins (AUS)	Orica–AIS	+ 11"
6	Shelley Olds (USA)	Alé Cipollini	+ 13"
7	Charlotte Becker (GER)	Wiggle–Honda	+ 13"
8	Anna Trevisi (ITA)	Estado de México–Faren Kuota	+ 21"
9	Annalisa Cucinotta (ITA)	Servetto Footon	+ 24"
10	Cecilie Gotaas Johnsen (NOR)	Hitec Products	+ 28"

== World Cup standings ==
Standings after 5 of 9 2014 UCI Women's Road World Cup races.

=== Individuals ===
	Cyclist	Team	World Cup points
1	Lizzie Armitstead (GBR)	Boels–Dolmans	420
2	Emma Johansson (SWE)	Orica–AIS	260
3	Anna van der Breggen (NED)	Rabobank-Liv Woman Cycling Team	238
4	Ellen van Dijk (NED)	Boels–Dolmans	220
5	Elisa Longo Borghini (ITA)	Hitec Products	215
6	Pauline Ferrand-Prévot (FRA)	Rabobank-Liv Woman Cycling Team	200
7	Kirsten Wild (NED)	Giant–Shimano	186
8	Elena Cecchini (ITA)	Estado de México–Faren Kuota	137
9	Shelley Olds (USA)	Alé Cipollini	135
10	Giorgia Bronzini (ITA)	Wiggle–Honda	125

Team: Boels–Dolmans Cycling Team
Mountain: Pauline Ferrand-Prévot
Sprint: Rebecca Wiasak
Youth: Pauline Ferrand-Prévot
