= 2010 Ronde van Gelderland =

Race details
- Dates: 17 April 2010
- Stages: 1
- Distance: 140 km (86.99 mi)
- Winning time: 3h 32' 53"

Results
	Winner	Kirsten Wild (NED)	(Cervélo Test Team)
	Second	Rochelle Gilmore (AUS)	(Australia National Team)
	Third	Kirsty Broun (AUS)	(Team TIBCO-To The Top)

The 2010 Ronde van Gelderland was the 8th running of the Ronde van Gelderland, a women's bicycle race in Gelderland, the Netherlands. The race was held over a distance of 140 kilometres (87.0 miles) on 17 April 2010 with the start and finish in Apeldoorn. It was rated by the UCI as a 1.2 category race.

== Results ==
	Cyclist	Team	Time
1	Kirsten Wild (NED)	Cervélo Test Team	3h 32' 53"
2	Rochelle Gilmore (AUS)	Lotto Ladies Team	+ 0"
3	Kirsty Broun (AUS)	Australia National Team	+ 0"
4	Brooke Miller (USA)	Team TIBCO-To The Top	+ 0"
5	Anne Arnouts (BEL)	Red Sun Cycling Team	+ 0"
6	Ellen van Dijk (NED)	Team HTC-Columbia Women	+ 0"
7	Annemiek van Vleuten (NED)	Nederland Bloeit	+ 0"
8	Natalie van Gogh (NED)	Swabo Ladies	+ 0"
9	Emma Johansson (SWE)	Red Sun Cycling Team	+ 0"
10	Emma Mackie (AUS)	Team TIBCO-To The Top	+ 0"

s.t. = same time
