= GP Eco-Struct =

Belgian one-day road cycling race

Race details
- Date: May
- Region: Schellebelle, Belgium
- Discipline: Road

History
- First edition: 2020
- Editions: 7 (as of 2026)
- First winner: Lorena Wiebes (NED)
- Most wins: Lorena Wiebes (NED) (2 wins)
- Most recent: Lien Schampaert (BEL)

The GP Eco-Struct is an elite women's professional one-day road bicycle race held annually in Schellebelle, Belgium. The event was first held in 2020 is currently rated by the UCI as a 1.1 category race.

== Past winners ==
Year	Country	Rider	Team
2020	Netherlands	Lorena Wiebes	Team Sunweb
2021	Netherlands	Lorena Wiebes	Team DSM
2022	Netherlands	Charlotte Kool	Team DSM
2023	Denmark	Amalie Dideriksen	Uno-X Pro Cycling Team
2024	Italy	Chiara Consonni	UAE Team ADQ
2025	Belgium	Julie Stockman	DD Group Pro Cycling Team
2026	Belgium	Lien Schampaert	Keukens Redant Cycling Team
