= Anna Trevisi =

Italian cyclist

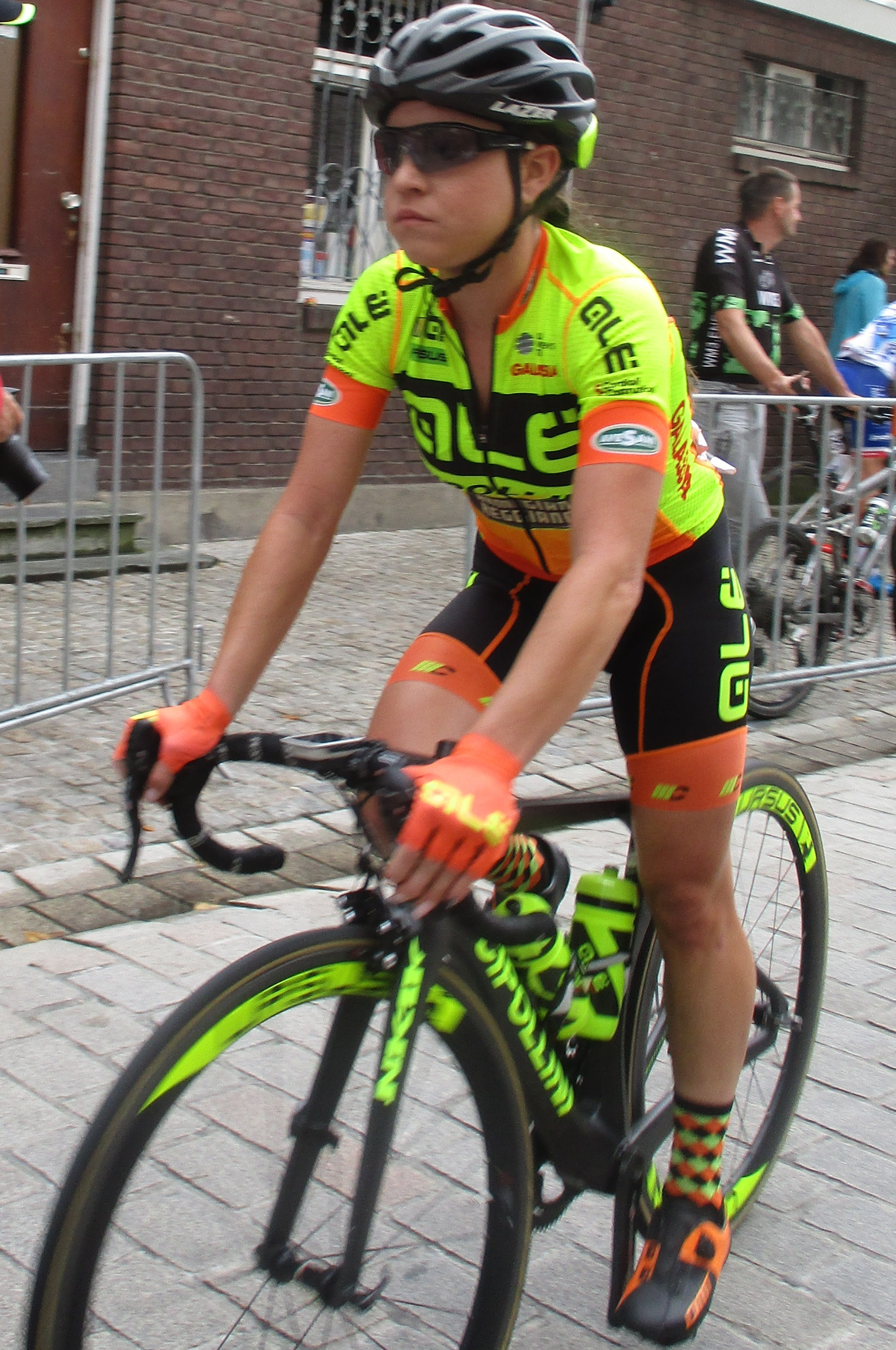
- Trevisi at the 2017 Holland Ladies Tour

Personal information
- Full name: Anna Trevisi
- Born: 8 May 1992 (age 34) Reggiolo, Italy

Cycling career
- Sport: Cycling
- Discipline: Road
- Role: Rider

Professional teams
- 2012–2013: Vaiano Tepso
- 2014: Estado de México–Faren Kuota
- 2015: Inpa Sottoli Giusfredi
- 2016–2023: Alé–Cipollini
- 2024–2025: Liv AlUla Jayco

Anna Trevisi (born 8 May 1992) is a retired Italian professional racing cyclist, who last rode for UCI Women's WorldTeam Liv AlUla Jayco. She won the junior road race at the 2010 European Road Championships.

== Major results ==
2013
8th Erondegemse Pijl
2014
8th Tour of Chongming Island World Cup
2015
10th Sparkassen Giro
2016
3rd Gran Prix San Luis Femenino
6th Women's Tour de Yorkshire
10th Gran Premio della Liberazione
2017
8th Grand Prix de Dottignies
2019
5th EPZ Omloop van Borsele
5th Vuelta a la Comunitat Valenciana Feminas
6th Trofee Maarten Wynants
2021
5th Ronde de Mouscron
2022
6th Ronde de Mouscron
7th Vuelta a la Comunitat Valenciana Feminas
9th Scheldeprijs
2023
7th Trofee Maarten Wynants
