= Annalisa Cucinotta =

Italian cyclist

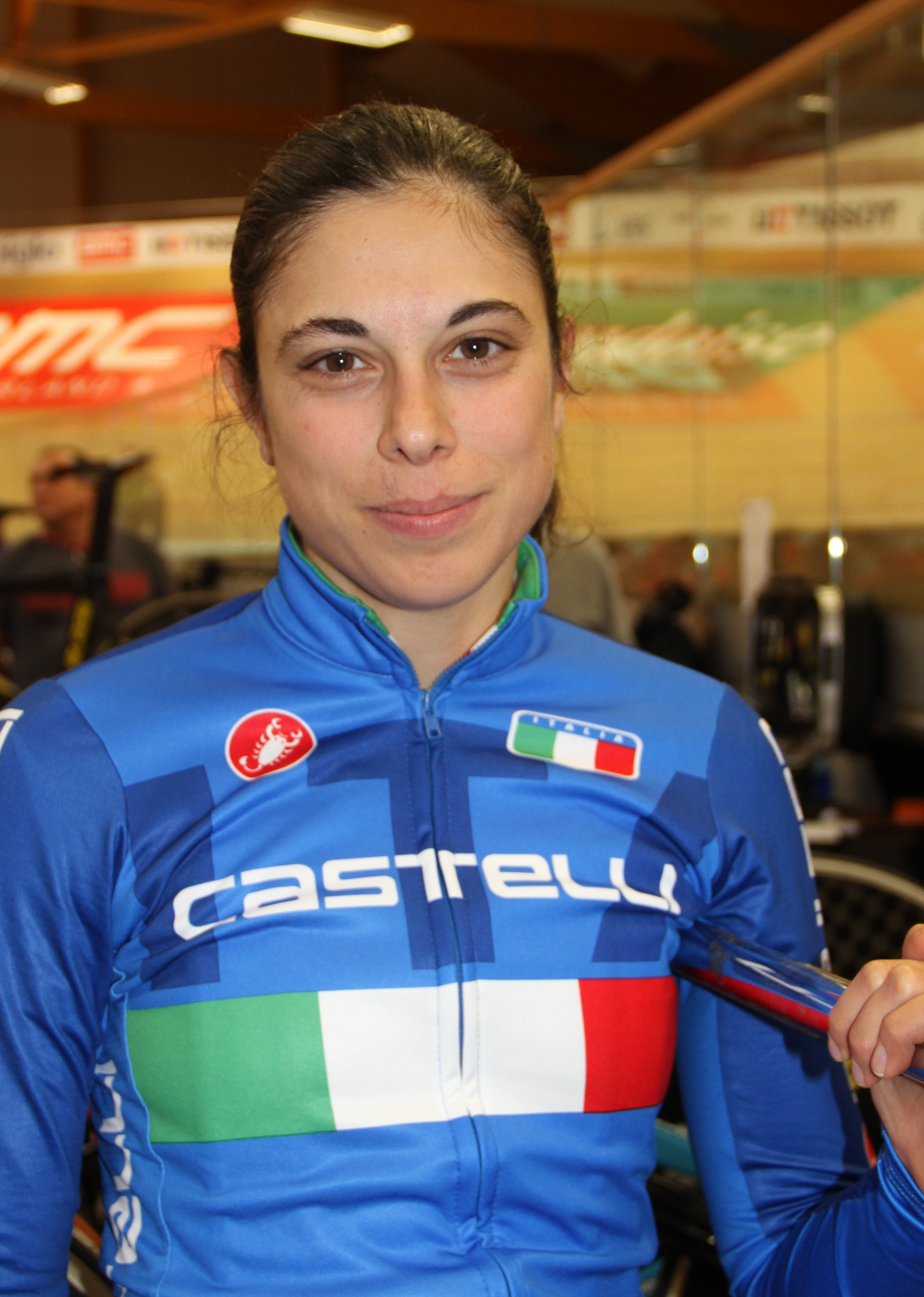
- Cucinotta in 2015

Personal information
- Full name: Annalisa Cucinotta
- Born: 3 April 1986 (age 40) Latisana, Italy

Cycling career
- Sport: Cycling
- Current team: Retired
- Disciplines: Road; Track
- Role: Rider

Professional teams
- 2006–2008: SC Michela Fanini Record Rox
- 2009: Gruppo Sportivo Top Girls–Fassa Bortolo–Raxy Line
- 2011–2012: Kleo Ladies Team
- 2013–2014: Servetto Footon
- 2015–2016: Alé–Cipollini
- 2017: Lensworld–Kuota

Annalisa Cucinotta (born 3 April 1986) is an Italian former professional road and track cyclist. She represented her nation at the 2015 UCI Track Cycling World Championships.

== Major results ==
=== Track ===
2003
2nd Scratch, UEC European Junior Track Championships
2004
UEC European Junior Track Championships

1st Scratch
2nd 500m time trial
2nd Sprint

3rd Scratch, 2004–05 UCI Track Cycling World Cup Classics, Moscow
2005
1st Scratch, 2004–05 UCI Track Cycling World Cup Classics, Sydney
2006
1st Scratch, 2006–07 UCI Track Cycling World Cup Classics, Moscow
2007
2nd Scratch, 2007–08 UCI Track Cycling World Cup Classics, Sydney
2nd Scratch, UEC European Under-23 Track Championships
2008
2008–09 UCI Track Cycling World Cup Classics

1st Scratch, Cali
2nd Scratch, Melbourne
3rd Team pursuit, Cali

2013
1st Omnium, Copa Internacional de Pista
3rd Omnium, International Belgian Open
2014
1st Scratch, Revolution – Round 2, Manchester
2nd Scratch, International Track Women & Men
3rd Omnium, UIV Talents Cup Final
3rd Omnium, International Belgian Open
2015
1st Scratch, Prova Internacional de Anadia
2nd Elimination race, UEC European Track Championships
3rd Points race, 3 Jours d'Aigle

=== Road ===
2006
2nd GP Liberazione
2007
3rd GP Liberazione
2008
1st Classica Citta di Padova
4th GP Liberazione
2011
5th GP Liberazione
9th GP Comune di Cornaredo
2014
9th Tour of Chongming Island World Cup
10th Overall Tour of Chongming Island
10th Grand Prix de Dottignies
2015
1st Stage 1 Ladies Tour of Qatar
1st Stage 4 Giro d'Italia Femminile
3rd Overall Tour of Chongming Island
3rd RideLondon Grand Prix
8th Tour of Chongming Island World Cup
2016
4th Overall Tour of Chongming Island
2017
5th Trofee Maarten Wynants
