= Willeke Arkema-Knol =

Dutch cyclist (born 1991)

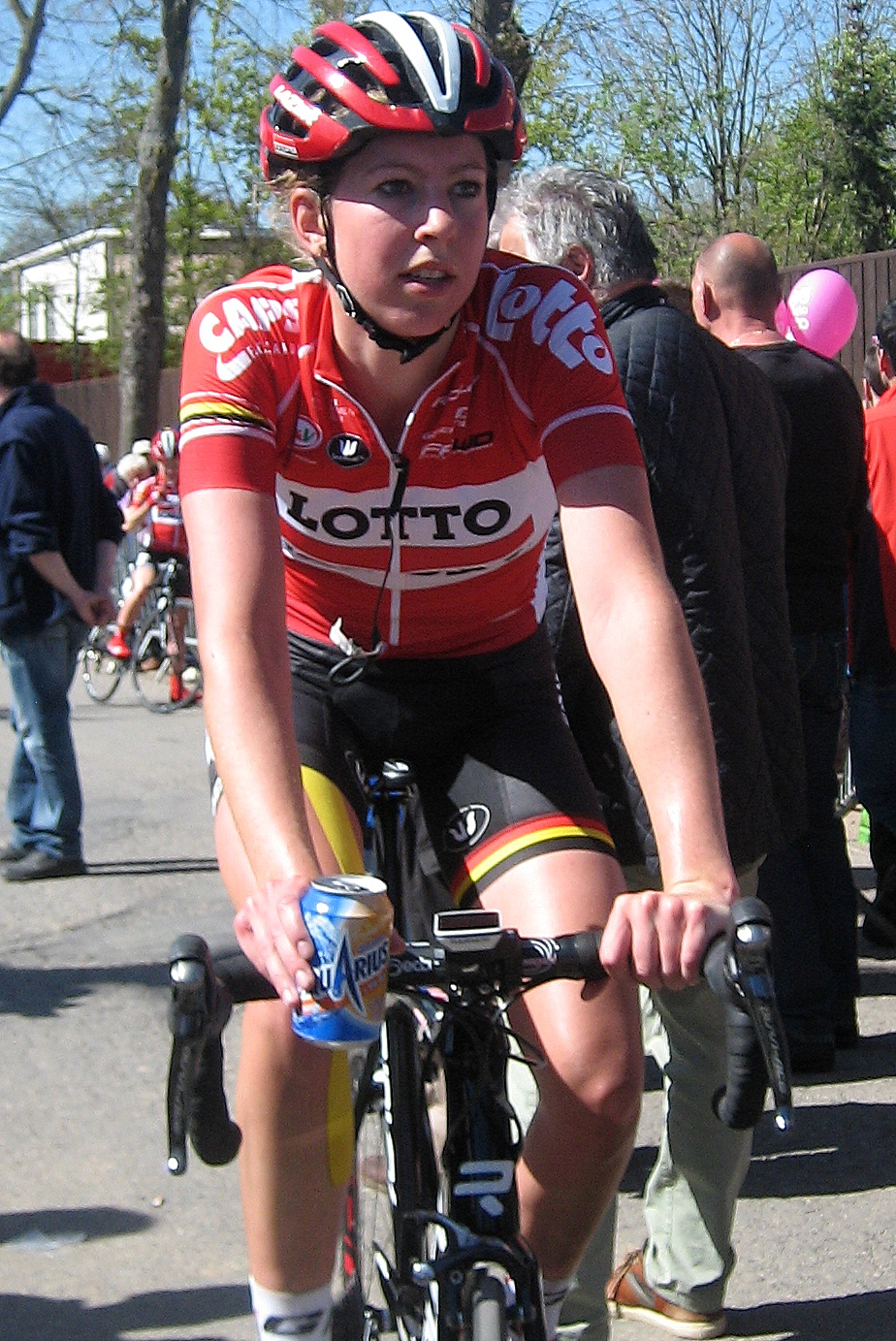
- Arkema-Knol in 2016

Personal information
- Full name: Willeke Arkema-Knol
- Born: Willeke Knol; 10 April 1991 (age 35) Hasselt, Netherlands

Cycling career
- Sport: Cycling
- Current team: Retired
- Discipline: Road
- Role: Rider

Professional teams
- 2013–2015: Argos–Shimano
- 2016: Lotto–Soudal Ladies
- 2017: Cylance Pro Cycling

Willeke Arkema-Knol (née Knol; born 10 April 1991) is a Dutch former racing cyclist. She competed in the 2013 UCI women's team time trial in Florence. In 2015, Knol finished sixth in the Acht van Westerveld.

== See also ==
- 2013 Team Argos–Shimano season
- 2014 Team Giant–Shimano season
- 2015 Team Liv–Plantur season
