= Elena Cecchini =

Italian cyclist (born 1992)

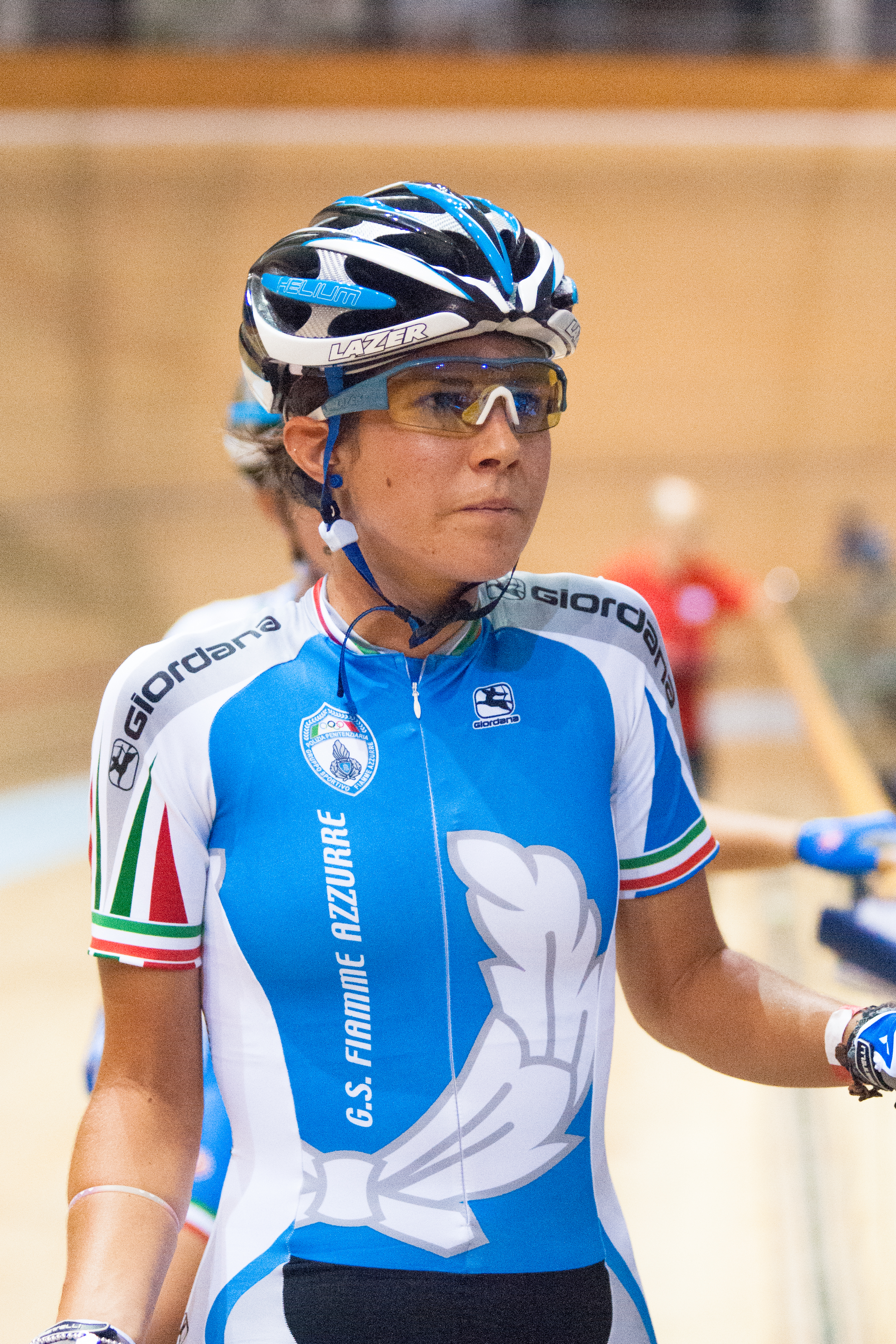
- Cecchini with the Fiamme Azzurre jersey in 2013

Personal information
- Born: 25 May 1992 (age 34) Udine, Italy

Cycling career
- Sport: Cycling
- Current team: Team SD Worx–Protime
- Disciplines: Road; Track
- Role: Rider
- Rider type: All-rounder

Amateur teams
- 2009–2010: Vecchia Fontana
- 2010–: G.S. Fiamme Azzurre

Professional teams
- 2011: Colavita Forno d'Asolo
- 2012: MCipollini–Giambenini–Gauss
- 2013–2014: Faren–Let's Go Finland
- 2015: Lotto–Soudal Ladies
- 2016–2020: Canyon//SRAM
- 2021–: SD Worx

Major wins
- Stage races Thüringen Rundfahrt der Frauen (2016) One day races & Classics National Road Race Championships (2014–2016) National Time Trial Championships (2018, 2019)
Medal record
Representing Italy
Women's road bicycle racing
World Championships
Silver medal – second place	2022 Wollongong	Mixed team relay
Bronze medal – third place	2021 Flanders	Mixed team relay
European Championships
Gold medal – first place	2021 Trentino	Mixed team relay
Gold medal – first place	2024 Limburg	Mixed team relay
Silver medal – second place	2023 Drenthe	Mixed team relay
Silver medal – second place	2025 Guilherand-Granges	Mixed team relay
Women's gravel bicycle racing
European Championships
Bronze medal – third place	2023 Oud-Heverlee	Elite

Elena Cecchini (born 25 May 1992) is an Italian racing cyclist, who currently rides for UCI Women's WorldTeam Team SD Worx–Protime. She competed in the 2013 UCI women's team time trial in Florence.

== Career ==
In 2013 and 2014, she rode for the Estado de México–Faren Kuota team. In November 2015, she was announced as part of the Canyon//SRAM team's inaugural squad for the 2016 season. She remained with the team until the end of the 2020 season; in August 2020, she signed a two-year contract with the SD Worx team, from the 2021 season.

== Personal life ==
Cecchini is married to fellow cyclist Elia Viviani. Cecchini is an athlete of Gruppo Sportivo Fiamme Azzurre.

== Major results ==
=== Track ===
2009
2nd Points race, UCI Juniors Track World Championships
2010
UEC European Junior Track Championships

1st Points race
2nd Team pursuit

3rd Scratch, UCI Junior Track Cycling World Championships
2011
National Track Championships

2nd Team sprint
3rd Keirin
3rd Scratch

2012
2nd Points race, UEC European Under-23 Track Championships
3rd Team pursuit, National Track Championships
2013
National Track Championships

1st Points race
1st Team pursuit

3 Jours d'Aigle

1st Points race
2nd Scratch

3rd Team pursuit, UEC European Under-23 Track Championships (with Beatrice Bartelloni, Maria Giulia Confalonieri and Chiara Vannucci)
2014
UEC European Under-23 Track Championships

1st Points race
3rd Team pursuit (with Beatrice Bartelloni, Maria Giulia Confalonieri and Francesca Pattaro)
3rd Scratch

1st Team pursuit, National Track Championships
International Track Women & Men (Under-23)

2nd Scratch
2nd Points race

UEC European Track Championships

3rd Points race
3rd Scratch

=== Road ===
2009
1st Road race, UEC European Junior Road Championships
5th Road race, UCI Junior World Championships
2010
6th Road race, UEC European Junior Road Championships
2011
5th GP Comune di Cornaredo
10th Overall Giro della Toscana Int. Femminile – Memorial Michela Fanini
2012
1st Overall Trophée d'Or Féminin

1st Stage 1

10th Overall Ladies Tour of Qatar
2013
5th Drentse 8 van Dwingeloo
10th Classica Citta di Padova
2014
1st Road race, National Road Championships
2nd Road race, UEC European Under-23 Road Championships
2nd Tour of Chongming Island World Cup
4th Grand Prix de Dottignies
5th Winston-Salem Cycling Classic
6th Overall Tour of Chongming Island
8th Overall Ladies Tour of Qatar
10th Overall The Women's Tour
10th Trofeo Alfredo Binda-Comune di Cittiglio
2015
1st Road race, National Road Championships
1st Stage 1 Festival Luxembourgeois du cyclisme féminin Elsy Jacobs
1st Sprints classification Tour Femenino de San Luis
3rd Overall BeNe Ladies Tour
3rd Durango-Durango Emakumeen Saria
4th Overall Belgium Tour
5th Tour of Flanders for Women
5th Dwars door de Westhoek
5th Sparkassen Giro
6th Omloop Het Nieuwsblad
6th Grand Prix de Dottignies
7th Gran Prix San Luis Femenino
7th GP de Plouay
7th La Madrid Challenge by La Vuelta
9th Trofeo Alfredo Binda-Comune di Cittiglio
10th Le Samyn des Dames
10th Strade Bianche Women
2016
1st Road race, National Road Championships
1st Overall Thüringen Rundfahrt der Frauen
2nd Team time trial, UCI Road World Championships
2nd GP de Plouay – Bretagne
2nd Dwars door de Westhoek
4th Overall Energiewacht Tour
8th Omloop van Borsele
8th Philadelphia Cycling Classic
9th Chrono Champenois
10th Overall Gracia–Orlová
2017
2nd Road race, National Road Championships
2nd Ronde van Drenthe
3rd Crescent Vårgårda TTT
5th Trofeo Alfredo Binda-Comune di Cittiglio
5th GP de Plouay – Bretagne
6th Tour of Flanders for Women
9th Gent–Wevelgem
10th Road race, UCI Road World Championships
10th Overall Holland Ladies Tour
10th Strade Bianche Women
2018
1st Team time trial, UCI Road World Championships
Mediterranean Games

1st Time trial
9th Road race

1st Time trial, National Road Championships
4th Road race, UEC European Road Championships
4th Open de Suède Vårgårda
4th GP de Plouay – Bretagne
5th Overall Thüringen Rundfahrt der Frauen

1st Stage 2

10th Overall Holland Ladies Tour
2019
1st Time trial, National Road Championships
2nd Road race, UEC European Road Championships
2nd Postnord Vårgårda West Sweden TTT
4th Dwars door Vlaanderen for Women
5th Trofeo Alfredo Binda-Comune di Cittiglio
8th Overall Thüringen Rundfahrt der Frauen

1st Stage 6

8th Gent–Wevelgem
9th Durango-Durango Emakumeen Saria
10th GP de Plouay – Bretagne
2020
UEC European Road Championships

3rd Mixed team relay
9th Road race

5th GP de Plouay
8th Clasica Femenina Navarra
2021
1st Mixed team relay, UEC European Road Championships
2nd Ronde van Drenthe
3rd Mixed team relay, UCI Road World Championships
2022
2nd Mixed team relay, UCI Road World Championships
2nd Postnord Vårgårda WestSweden TTT
4th Omloop van het Hageland
5th Trofeo Alfredo Binda
9th Drentse Acht van Westerveld
2023
2nd Team relay, UEC European Road Championships
2024
1st Team relay, UEC European Road Championships
