= Barbara Guarischi =

Italian cyclist (born 1990)

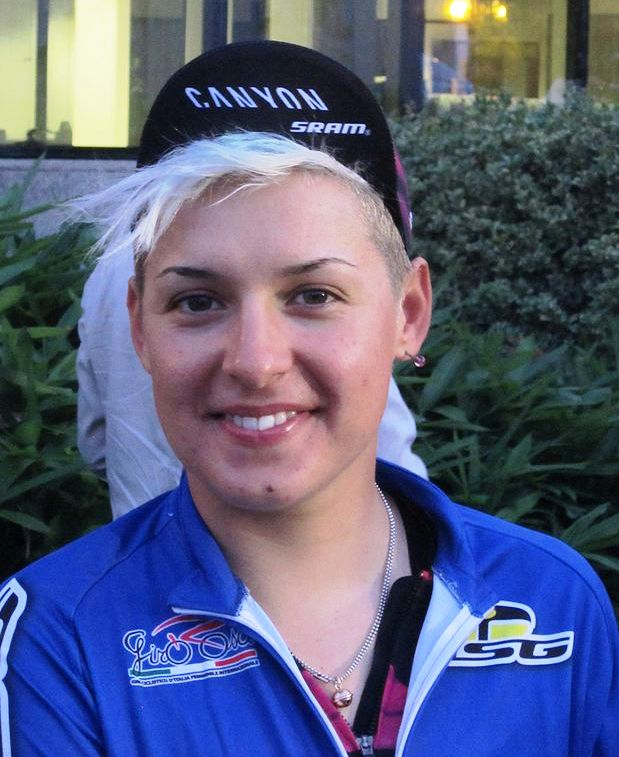
- Guarischi in 2016

Personal information
- Full name: Barbara Guarischi
- Born: 2 October 1990 (age 36) Ponte San Pietro, Italy

Cycling career
- Sport: Cycling
- Current team: Team SD Worx–Protime
- Discipline: Road
- Role: Rider
- Rider type: Sprinter; Classics specialist

Professional teams
- 2009: Cmax Dilà
- 2010: SC Michela Fanini Record Rox
- 2011: Colavita Forno d'Asolo
- 2012: Fassa Bortolo–Servetto
- 2013: Vaiano Fondriest
- 2014: Alé–Cipollini
- 2015: Velocio–SRAM
- 2016–2017: Canyon//SRAM
- 2018–2019: Team Virtu Cycling
- 2020–2022: Movistar Team
- 2023–: SD Worx
Medal record
Representing Italy
Women's road cycling
Mediterranean Games
Gold medal – first place	2022 Oran	Road race
Bronze medal – third place	2026 Taranto	Road race

Barbara Guarischi (born 2 October 1990) is an Italian racing cyclist, who rides for UCI Women's WorldTeam Team SD Worx–Protime.

== Career ==
She competed in the 2013 UCI women's team time trial in Florence. In November 2015 she was announced as part of the Canyon//SRAM team's inaugural squad for the 2016 season.

== Major results ==
2007
2nd Scratch, UEC European Junior Track Championships
2009
6th GP Liberazione
2010
8th GP Liberazione
10th Grand Prix de Dottignies
2011
10th Liberty Classic
2012
2nd Road race, UEC European Under-23 Road Championships
5th Classica Citta di Padova
6th GP Liberazione
2013
5th Classica Citta di Padova
2014
1st Stage 2 La Route de France
1st Stage 3 Trophée d'Or Féminin
4th Overall Energiewacht Tour
4th Drentse 8 van Dwingeloo
5th Overall Tour of Chongming Island
2015
1st Team time trial, UCI Road World Championships
1st RideLondon Grand Prix
1st Sparkassen Giro
1st Stage 2a (TTT) Energiewacht Tour
1st Stage 1 Giro d'Italia Femminile
3rd Ronde van Gelderland
4th EPZ Omloop van Borsele
5th Novilon EDR Cup
10th Ronde van Drenthe World Cup
2016
1st Omloop van Borsele
3rd Gran Premio Bruno Beghelli Internazionale Donne Elite
2017
1st Sprints classification, Healthy Ageing Tour
2nd Pajot Hills Classic
7th Drentse Acht van Westerveld
9th RideLondon Classique
2018
5th Postnord UCI WWT Vårgårda WestSweden
9th Gent–Wevelgem
2019
Thüringen Rundfahrt der Frauen

1st Sprints classification
1st Stage 1

5th Le Samyn des Dames
2020
2nd Vuelta a la Comunitat Valenciana Feminas
2021
2nd Vuelta a la Comunitat Valenciana Feminas
3rd Dwars door de Westhoek
2022
1st Road race, Mediterranean Games
3rd Road race, National Road Championships
5th Scheldeprijs
5th Postnord Vårgårda WestSweden
6th Nokere Koerse voor Dames
2023
1st Stages 1 (TTT) & 3 Thüringen Ladies Tour
2024
1st Stage 4 Holland Ladies Tour
2nd Veenendaal-Veenendaal
2025
3rd Festival Elsy Jacobs à Luxembourg
4th Scheldeprijs
2026
4th Overall Tour de Pologne Women
