= 2013 Team Argos–Shimano season =

Cycling team season

2013 Team Argos–Shimano
- UCI Team ranking: 8th
- Manager: Iwan Spekenbrink

Season victories
- One-day races
- Stage race overall
- Best ranked rider: Kirsten Wild (8th)

The 2013 women's road cycling season was the third for Team Argos–Shimano, which began as Team Skil-Argos in 2010.

== Roster ==
Ages as of 1 January 2013.

Rider	Date of birth
Charlotte Becker (Note: Becker left the team on 25 May.) (GER)	19 May 1983 (aged 29)
Lucy Garner (GBR)	20 September 1994 (aged 18)
Elke Gebhardt (GER)	22 July 1983 (aged 29)
Marlen Jörend (Note: Jörend left the team on 29 May.) (GER)	1 February 1986 (aged 26)
Janneke Kanis (NED)	15 February 1985 (aged 27)
Willeke Knol (NED)	4 October 1991 (aged 21)

Rider	Date of birth
Kelly Markus (NED)	2 July 1993 (aged 19)
Amy Pieters (NED)	1 June 1991 (aged 21)
Esra Tromp (NED)	15 October 1990 (aged 22)
Kirsten Wild (NED)	15 October 1982 (aged 30)
Floortje Mackaij (Note: Mackaij joined the team on 1 August as a stagiaire.) (NED)	18 October 1995 (aged 17)

== Results in major races ==
=== Single day races ===
Results at the 2013 World Cup races
Date	#	Race	Best rider	Place
9 March	1	Ronde van Drenthe	(Netherlands) Kirsten Wild	5th
24 March	2	Trofeo Alfredo Binda-Comune di Cittiglio	(Netherlands) Willeke Knol	55th
31 March	3	Tour of Flanders	(Netherlands) Kirsten Wild	10th
17 April	4	La Flèche Wallonne Féminine	(Netherlands) Amy Pieters	64
12 May	5	Tour of Chongming Island	(Netherlands) Amy Pieters	3rd
16 August	6	Open de Suède Vårgårda TTT	Team Argos-Shimano	11th
18 August	7	Open de Suède Vårgårda	(Netherlands) Amy Pieters	3rd
31 August	8	GP de Plouay	-	-
Final individual classification			(Netherlands) Amy Pieters	7th
Final team classification			Team Argos-Shimano	6th

Other major single day races
Date	Race	Best rider	Place
22 September	UCI Road World Championships – Women's team time trial	Team Argos-Shimano	7th
24 September	UCI Road World Championships – Women's time trial (Note: Riders are part of the national team)	-	-
28 September	UCI Road World Championships – Women's road race (Note: Riders are part of the national team)	(Germany) Elke Gebhardt (United Kingdom) Lucy Garner (Netherlands) Amy Pieters (Netherlands) Kirsten Wild	DNF

=== Grand Tours ===
Results of the team in the grand tours
Grand tour	Giro d'Italia Femminile
Rider (classification)	DNS
Victories	0 stage wins

== UCI World Ranking ==
The team finished eight in the UCI ranking for teams.

Individual world ranking
Rank	Rider	Points
8	(Netherlands) Kirsten Wild	370
31	(Netherlands) Amy Pieters	174
66	(United Kingdom) Lucy Garner	75
90	(Germany) Elke Gebhardt	54
183	(Netherlands) Janneke Kanis	15
406	(Netherlands) Esra Tromp	3
