= Shelley Olds =

American cyclist (born 1980)

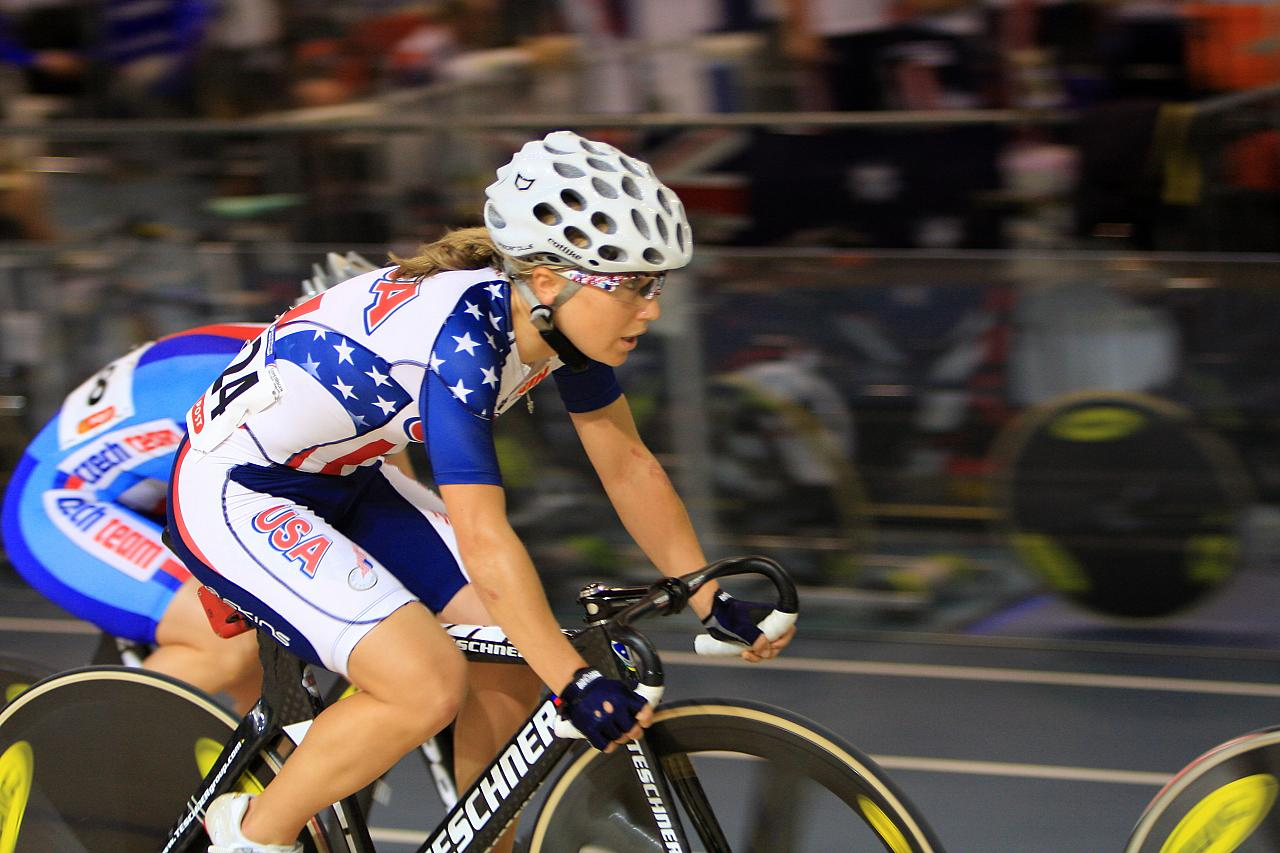
- Olds during the points race at the 2010 UCI Track Cycling World Championships

Personal information
- Full name: Shelley Olds
- Born: September 30, 1980 (age 46) Groton, Massachusetts
- Height: 5 ft 2 in (1.57 m)

Cycling career
- Sport: Cycling
- Current team: Retired
- Disciplines: Road; Track
- Role: Rider
- Rider type: Sprinter

Professional teams
- 2008–2009: ProMan Hit Squad
- 2010: Twenty12
- 2011: Diadora–Pasta Zara
- 2012: AA Drink–leontien.nl
- 2013: Team TIBCO–To The Top
- 2014: Alé–Cipollini
- 2015: Bigla Pro Cycling Team
- 2015: Alé–Cipollini
- 2016: Cylance Pro Cycling

Major wins
- Women's Tour of New Zealand (2010); Tour of Chongming Island World Cup (2012)
Medal record
Women's road bicycle racing
Representing United States
Pan American Championships
| Gold medal – first place | 2010 Aguascalientes | Road race |
| Bronze medal – third place | 2010 Aguascalientes | Time trial |

Shelley Olds (born September 30, 1980) is an American former professional racing cyclist.

== Career ==
Olds was born and raised in Groton, Massachusetts. She studied health and human performance at Roanoke College in Virginia, and was captain of their women's soccer team. A star on the soccer pitch, Olds was a two-time NSCAA All-South Region selection, four-time All-ODAC selection and the 2002 ODAC Player of the Year. She was inducted into the Roanoke Athletic Hall of Fame in 2016.

After college, she moved to California and was introduced to cycling by Rob Evans, whom she later married. She started racing locally on the road, quickly moving up in the ranks and winning the Road Cycling State Championships. She then joined Peanut Butter & Co.TWENTY12 team, won the Track National Scratch Race Championships in 2008 and 2009 and then won the National Criterium Championships in 2010 and 2011. She began racing internationally soon after and earned podium results in the Tour of New Zealand, Trofeo Costa Etrusca Iii in Italy, Drentse 8 Van Dwingeloo in Netherlands, as well as Liberty Classic road race in Philadelphia. She registered with the UCI under her married name of Shelley Evans for the 2010 season, but reverted to her maiden name in later seasons.

In 2012, Olds signed with Dutch team AA Drink–leontien.nl and won the Tour of Chongming Island World Cup to earn a qualifying spot on the US National team for the Road race at the London Olympics. At the Olympics, she was one of the four riders in the winning breakaway group that split from the peloton with 50 kilometres (31 miles) to go, but suffered a puncture 29 kilometres (18 miles) later. After a tire change, she caught back up to the peloton and finished in 7th place.

Olds carried on with her professional racing career with multiple UCI Women teams, and continued her ascent to become one of the top sprinters in the world. She took multiple Sprinters' jerseys in races across Italy, Norway and China. Back in North America, she won the Winston-Salem Cycling Classic in North Carolina, the Grand Prix Cycliste de Gatineau in Quebec, Canada, and the White Spot/Delta road race in British Columbia, Canada.

In 2015, while riding for the Italian Alé–Cipollini team, Olds won the inaugural edition of La Madrid Challenge by La Vuelta in a bunch sprint beating out top sprinters in the world at the time. She moved back to the United States in 2016 to join Cylance Pro Cycling team and started the year with a 2nd place finish in the Women's Down Under Tour in Australia, but had to retire in March of that year after crashing and suffering from head injuries in back to back races in Europe.

== Major results ==
2008
1st Scratch, National Track Championships
8th Liberty Classic
2009
1st Scratch, National Track Championships
2009–10 UCI Track Cycling World Cup Classics

2nd Points race, Melbourne
3rd Scratch, Manchester

3rd Points race, 2008–09 UCI Track Cycling World Cup Classics, Copenhagen
3rd Liberty Classic
2010
1st Road race, Pan American Road Championships
1st National Criterium Championships
1st Overall Women's Tour of New Zealand

1st Stages 1, 2, 5 & 6

1st Stage 10 Giro d'Italia Femminile
2nd Liberty Classic
2011
1st GP Costa Etrusca
2nd Drentse 8 van Dwingeloo
2nd Liberty Classic
5th Trofeo Alfredo Binda-Comune di Cittiglio
6th Grand Prix de Dottignies
2012
Tour of Chongming Island

1st World Cup
4th Overall Stage race

1st Stage 6 Giro d'Italia Femminile
2nd 7-Dorpenomloop Aalburg
4th Road race, Pan American Road Championships
4th Open de Suède Vårgårda
7th Road race, Summer Olympics
8th Holland Hills Classic
2013
1st Grand Prix cycliste de Gatineau
2nd Le Samyn des Dames
2nd Omloop van het Hageland
4th Drentse 8 van Dwingeloo
4th Philadelphia Cycling Classic
5th Overall Belgium Tour
5th Overall Giro della Toscana Int. Femminile – Memorial Michela Fanini

1st Points classification

5th Omloop Het Nieuwsblad
5th Cholet Pays de Loire Dames
6th Ronde van Drenthe World Cup
7th Chrono Gatineau
8th Overall Tour of Chongming Island
2014
1st Overall Giro della Toscana Int. Femminile — Memorial Michela Fanini

1st Points classification
1st Prologue & Stage 1

1st GP Comune di Cornaredo
1st Winston-Salem Cycling Classic
2nd Overall Tour of Chongming Island
2nd Novilon EDR Cup
2nd Grand Prix de Dottignies
3rd Overall Festival Luxembourgeois du cyclisme féminin Elsy Jacobs
3rd Ronde van Drenthe World Cup
5th La Course by Le Tour de France
6th Road race, UCI Road World Championships
6th Tour of Chongming Island World Cup
8th Overall Vuelta Internacional Femenina a Costa Rica

1st Stages 3 & 5

10th Sparkassen Giro
2015
1st White Spot / Delta Road Race
1st La Madrid Challenge by La Vuelta
2nd Overall Ladies Tour of Norway

1st Points classification
1st Stage 2

2nd EPZ Omloop van Borsele
Tour of Chongming Island

4th World Cup
5th Overall Stage race

4th Philadelphia Cycling Classic
7th Dwars door de Westhoek
9th Crescent Women World Cup Vårgårda
2016
2nd Overall Women's Tour Down Under
4th Omloop van het Hageland
5th Omloop Het Nieuwsblad
6th Ronde van Drenthe
