= 2014 Wiggle–Honda season =

- Manager: Rochelle Gilmore

Season victories
- One-day races: 1
- Stage race overall: 2
- Stage race stages: 9

The 2014 women's road cycling season was the second for the Wiggle–Honda cycling team.

== Roster ==
Ages as of 1 January 2014

Rider	Date of birth
Elinor Barker (GBR)	7 September 1994 (age 32)
Beatrice Bartelloni (ITA)	5 February 1993 (age 33)
Charlotte Becker (GER)	19 May 1983 (age 43)
Kathryn Bertine (Note: Bertine joined the team on 1 July.) (SKN)	11 May 1975 (age 51)
Giorgia Bronzini (ITA)	3 August 1983 (age 43)
Emily Collins (NZL)	16 September 1990 (age 36)
Emilia Fahlin (SWE)	24 October 1988 (age 37)
Rochelle Gilmore (AUS)	14 December 1981 (age 44)
Mayuko Hagiwara (JPN)	16 October 1986 (age 39)

Rider	Date of birth
Dani King (GBR)	21 November 1990 (age 35)
Peta Mullens (AUS)	8 March 1988 (age 38)
Amy Roberts (GBR)	24 December 1994 (age 31)
Joanna Rowsell (GBR)	5 December 1988 (age 37)
Anna Sanchis (ESP)	18 October 1987 (age 38)
Anna-Bianca Schnitzmeier (GER)	27 July 1990 (age 36)
Laura Trott (GBR)	24 April 1992 (age 34)
Linda Villumsen (NZL)	9 April 1985 (age 41)

Australian criteriums

A few other riders rode at the end of 2014 in name of the team criteriums in Australia.

Rider	Date of birth
Georgia Baker (Note: Baker joined the team on 5 December.) (AUS)	21 September 1994 (age 32)
Jessica Mundy (Note: Mundy joined the team on 15 October.) (AUS)	25 September 1994 (age 32)
Eileen Roe (GBR)	24 September 1989 (age 37)
Rebecca Wiasak (Note: Wiasak joined the team on 5 November.) (AUS)	25 May 1984 (age 42)

Riders who joined the team for the 2014 season

Rider	2013 team
Emilia Fahlin (SWE)	Team Hitec Products
Peta Mullens (AUS)	
Anna Sanchis (ESP)	Bizkaia–Durango

Riders who left the team during or after the 2013 season

Rider	2014 team
Lauren Kitchen (AUS)	Team Hitec Products

== Season victories ==
Date	Race	Cat.	Rider	Country	Location
7 April	Grand Prix de Dottignies	1.2	Giorgia Bronzini (ITA)	Belgium	Dottignies
16 May	Tour of Chongming Island, Stage 3	2.1	Giorgia Bronzini (ITA)	China	Chongming
21 May	Tour of Zhoushan Island, Stage 1	2.2	Charlotte Becker (GER)	China	Shengsi
23 May	Tour of Zhoushan Island, Stage 3	2.2	Giorgia Bronzini (ITA)	China	Zhujiajian
23 May	Tour of Zhoushan Island, Overall	2.2	Charlotte Becker (GER)	China	
23 May	Tour of Zhoushan Island, Points classification	2.2	Giorgia Bronzini (ITA)	China	
6 July	Giro d'Italia Femminile, Stage 2	2.1	Giorgia Bronzini (ITA)	Italy	Frattamaggiore
12 August	La Route de France, Stage 3	2.1	Giorgia Bronzini (ITA)	France	Vendôme
2 September	Tour Cycliste Féminin International de l'Ardèche, Stage 1	2.2	Giorgia Bronzini (ITA)	France	Beauchastel
3 September	Tour Cycliste Féminin International de l'Ardèche, Stage 2	2.2	Linda Villumsen (NZL)	France	Alba la Romaine
4 September	Tour Cycliste Féminin International de l'Ardèche, Stage 4	2.2	Giorgia Bronzini (ITA)	France	Cruas
6 September	Tour Cycliste Féminin International de l'Ardèche, Stage 6	2.2	Giorgia Bronzini (ITA)	France	Rochegude
7 September	Tour Cycliste Féminin International de l'Ardèche, Overall	2.2	Linda Villumsen (NZL)	France	
7 September	Tour Cycliste Féminin International de l'Ardèche, Points classification	2.2	Giorgia Bronzini (ITA)	France	
