= List of rosters for Mcipollini–Giordana and its successors =

This page lists the rosters, by season, of the UCI Women's Team, UAE Team ADQ.

== 2016 ==
As of 1 January 2016. Ages as of 1 January 2016.

Rider	Date of birth
Martina Alzini (ITA)	10 February 1997 (aged 18)
Marta Bastianelli (ITA)	30 April 1987 (aged 28)
Annalisa Cucinotta (ITA)	4 March 1986 (aged 29)
Emilia Fahlin (SWE)	24 October 1988 (aged 27)
Małgorzata Jasińska (POL)	18 January 1984 (aged 31)
Dalia Muccioli (ITA)	22 May 1993 (aged 22)

Rider	Date of birth
Beatrice Rossato (ITA)	6 November 1996 (aged 19)
Ane Santesteban Gonzalez (ESP)	12 December 1990 (aged 25)
Ellen Skerritt (AUS)	20 December 1994 (aged 21)
Marta Tagliaferro (ITA)	4 November 1989 (aged 26)
Anna Trevisi (ITA)	8 May 1992 (aged 23)

== 2015 ==
As of 10 March 2015. Ages as of 1 January 2015.

Rider	Date of birth
Elena Berlato (ITA)	August 2, 1988 (aged 26)
Beatrice Bartelloni (ITA)	February 5, 1993 (aged 21)
Simona Frapporti (ITA)	July 14, 1988 (aged 26)
Francesca Cauz (ITA)	September 24, 1992 (aged 22)
Marta Tagliaferro (ITA)	November 4, 1989 (aged 25)
Annalisa Cucinotta (ITA)	March 4, 1986 (aged 28)
Flávia Oliveira (BRA)	October 27, 1981 (aged 33)
Uênia Fernandes de Souza (BRA)	August 12, 1984 (aged 30)

Rider	Date of birth
Alice Algisi (ITA)	March 10, 1993 (aged 21)
Beatrice Rossato (ITA)	November 6, 1996 (aged 18)
Fleur Faure (FRA)	August 13, 1993 (aged 21)
Arianna Fidanza (ITA)	January 6, 1995 (aged 19)
Dalia Muccioli (ITA)	May 22, 1993 (aged 21)
Maria Giulia Confalonieri (ITA)	March 30, 1993 (aged 21)
Małgorzata Jasińska (POL)	January 18, 1984 (aged 30)

== 2014 ==
Ages as of 1 January 2014.

Rider	Date of birth
Monia Baccaille (ITA)	April 10, 1984 (aged 29)
Elena Berlato (ITA)	August 2, 1988 (aged 25)
Ilaria Bonomi (ITA)	May 13, 1995 (aged 18)
Valentina Carretta (ITA)	September 16, 1989 (aged 24)
Barbara Guarischi (ITA)	February 10, 1990 (aged 23)
Tatiana Guderzo (ITA)	August 22, 1984 (aged 29)

Rider	Date of birth
Małgorzata Jasińska (POL)	January 18, 1984 (aged 29)
Shelley Olds (USA)	September 30, 1980 (aged 33)
Michela Pavin (ITA)	July 15, 1994 (aged 19)
Carla Ryan (AUS)	September 21, 1985 (aged 28)
Ane Santesteban (ESP)	December 12, 1990 (aged 23)
Marta Tagliaferro (ITA)	November 4, 1989 (aged 24)

== 2013 ==
Ages as of 1 January 2013.

Rider	Date of birth
Tatiana Antoshina (RUS)	July 27, 1982 (aged 30)
Monia Baccaille (ITA)	April 10, 1984 (aged 28)
Valentina Carretta (ITA)	September 16, 1989 (aged 23)
Sara Grifi (ITA)	September 26, 1988 (aged 24)
Tatiana Guderzo (ITA)	August 22, 1984 (aged 28)
Małgorzata Jasińska (POL)	January 18, 1984 (aged 28)

Rider	Date of birth
Michela Pavin (ITA)	July 15, 1994 (aged 18)
Sari Saarelainen (FIN)	March 1, 1981 (aged 31)
Valentina Scandolara (ITA)	May 1, 1990 (aged 22)
Anna Zita Maria Stricker (ITA)	July 3, 1994 (aged 18)
Marta Tagliaferro (ITA)	November 4, 1989 (aged 23)

== 2012 ==
Ages as of 1 January 2012.

Rider	Date of birth
Monia Baccaille (ITA)	April 10, 1984 (aged 27)
Marta Bastianelli (ITA)	April 30, 1987 (aged 24)
Alessandra Borchi (ITA)	August 15, 1983 (aged 28)
Valentina Carretta (ITA)	September 16, 1989 (aged 22)
Elena Cecchini (ITA)	May 25, 1992 (aged 19)
Tatiana Guderzo (ITA)	August 22, 1984 (aged 27)

Rider	Date of birth
Małgorzata Jasińska (POL)	January 18, 1984 (aged 27)
Giulia Pironato (ITA)	June 2, 1993 (aged 18)
Marta Tagliaferro (ITA)	November 4, 1989 (aged 22)
Alessandra Tomasini (ITA)	September 6, 1993 (aged 18)
Elena Valentini (ITA)	March 30, 1992 (aged 19)
Susanna Zorzi (ITA)	March 13, 1992 (aged 19)

== 2011 ==
Ages as of 1 January 2011.

Rider	Date of birth
Monia Baccaille (ITA)	April 10, 1984 (aged 26)
Marta Bastianelli (ITA)	April 30, 1987 (aged 23)
Yulia Blindyuk (RUS)	December 11, 1984 (aged 26)
Rossella Callovi (ITA)	April 5, 1991 (aged 19)
Nicole Cooke (GBR)	April 13, 1983 (aged 27)
Elisa Frisoni (ITA)	August 8, 1985 (aged 25)

Rider	Date of birth
Samantha Galassi (ITA)	July 28, 1988 (aged 22)
Rossella Gobbo (ITA)	January 27, 1991 (aged 19)
Tatiana Guderzo (ITA)	August 22, 1984 (aged 26)
Jennifer Hohl (SUI)	February 3, 1986 (aged 24)
Fabiana Luperini (ITA)	January 14, 1974 (aged 36)
Marta Tagliaferro (ITA)	November 4, 1989 (aged 21)
