= List of rosters for Top Girls Fassa Bortolo Hausbrandt Caffé and its successors =

This page lists previous rosters of UCI Women's team Top Girls Fassa Bortolo.

== 2015 ==
As of 10 March 2015. Ages as of 1 January 2015.

Rider	Date of birth
Elena Leonardi (ITA)	December 7, 1995 (aged 19)
Chiara Pierobon (ITA)	January 21, 1993 (aged 21)
Irene Bitto (ITA)	November 2, 1993 (aged 21)
Sara Grifi (ITA)	September 26, 1988 (aged 26)
Nicole Dal Santo (ITA)	August 25, 1995 (aged 19)

Rider	Date of birth
Jennifer Fiori (ITA)	March 23, 1986 (aged 28)
Asja Paladin (ITA)	September 27, 1994 (aged 20)
Rossella Callovi (ITA)	April 5, 1991 (aged 23)
Soraya Paladin (ITA)	May 4, 1993 (aged 21)

== 2014 ==
As of January 8, 2014.

Rider	Date of birth
Irene Bitto (ITA)	November 3, 1993 (age 32)
Francesca Cauz (ITA)	September 24, 1992 (age 33)
Silvia Cecchini (ITA)	May 10, 1994 (age 31)
Jennifer Fiori (ITA)	March 23, 1986 (age 40)
Sara Grifi (ITA)	August 26, 1988 (age 37)

Rider	Date of birth
Natasha Grillo (ITA)	November 17, 1995 (age 30)
Soraya Paladin (ITA)	April 5, 1993 (age 33)
Asja Paladin (ITA)	September 27, 1994 (age 31)
Chiara Pierobon (ITA)	January 21, 1993 (age 33)

== 2013 ==
Ages as of 1 January 2013.

Rider	Date of birth
Elena Berlato (ITA)	August 2, 1988 (aged 24)
Irene Bitto (ITA)	November 2, 1993 (aged 19)
Francesca Cauz (ITA)	September 24, 1992 (aged 20)
Silvia Cecchini (ITA)	October 5, 1994 (aged 18)
Jennifer Fiori (ITA)	March 23, 1986 (aged 26)

Rider	Date of birth
Asja Paladin (ITA)	September 27, 1994 (aged 18)
Chiara Pierobon (ITA)	January 21, 1993 (aged 19)
Francesca Stefani (ITA)	January 25, 1991 (aged 21)
Elena Valentini (ITA)	March 30, 1992 (aged 20)

== 2012 ==
Ages as of 1 January 2012.

Rider	Date of birth
Elena Berlato (ITA)	August 2, 1988 (aged 23)
Irene Bitto (ITA)	November 2, 1993 (aged 18)
Francesca Cauz (ITA)	September 24, 1992 (aged 19)
Erika Cecchel (ITA)	January 10, 1992 (aged 19)
Jennifer Fiori (ITA)	March 23, 1986 (aged 25)

Rider	Date of birth
Viviana Gatto (ITA)	March 30, 1992 (aged 19)
Barbara Guarischi (ITA)	October 2, 1990 (aged 21)
Soraya Paladin (ITA)	May 4, 1993 (aged 18)
Giulia Ronchi (ITA)	March 6, 1992 (aged 19)
Doris Schweizer (SUI)	August 28, 1989 (aged 22)

== 2011 ==
Ages as of 1 January 2011.

Rider	Date of birth
Elena Berlato (ITA)	August 2, 1988 (aged 22)
Valentina Carretta (ITA)	September 16, 1989 (aged 21)
Jennifer Fiori (ITA)	March 23, 1986 (aged 24)
Simona Frapporti (ITA)	July 14, 1988 (aged 22)
Elisa Longo Borghini (ITA)	December 10, 1991 (aged 19)

Rider	Date of birth
Bridie O'Donnell (AUS)	April 29, 1974 (aged 36)
Gloria Presti (ITA)	September 29, 1989 (aged 21)
Giulia Ronchi (ITA)	March 6, 1992 (aged 18)
Silvia Valsecchi (ITA)	July 19, 1982 (aged 28)
