= 2014 Alé–Cipollini season =

Alé–Cipollini
- Alé–Cipollini
- Manager: Alessia Piccolo

Season victories
- One-day races: 2
- Stage race overall: –
- Stage race stages: 4

The 2014 women's road cycling season was the fourth for the Alé–Cipollini cycling team, which began as the MCipollini–Giordana in 2011.

== Roster ==
Rider	Date of birth
Monia Baccaille (ITA)	10 April 1984 (age 42)
Elena Berlato (ITA)	2 August 1988 (age 38)
Ilaria Bonomi (ITA)	13 May 1995 (age 31)
Valentina Carretta (ITA)	16 September 1989 (age 36)
Barbara Guarischi (ITA)	10 February 1990 (age 36)
Tatiana Guderzo (ITA)	22 August 1984 (age 41)

Rider	Date of birth
Małgorzata Jasińska (POL)	18 January 1984 (age 42)
Shelley Olds (USA)	30 September 1980 (age 45)
Michela Pavin (ITA)	15 July 1994 (age 32)
Carla Ryan (AUS)	21 September 1985 (age 40)
Ane Santesteban (ESP)	12 December 1990 (age 35)
Marta Tagliaferro (ITA)	4 November 1989 (age 36)

Riders who joined the team for the 2014 season
Rider	2013 team
Elena Berlato (ITA)	Top Girls Fassa Bortolo
Ilaria Bonomi (ITA)	
Barbara Guarischi (ITA)	Vaiano Fondriest
Shelley Olds (USA)	Team TIBCO – To The Top
Ane Santesteban (ESP)	Bizkaia–Durango

Riders who left the team during or after the 2013 season
Rider	2014 team
Tatiana Antoshina (RUS)	RusVelo
Sara Grifi (ITA)	Top Girls Fassa Bortolo
Sylwia Kapusta (POL)	Vaiano Fondriest
Valentina Scandolara (ITA)	Orica–AIS
Anna Maria Stricker (ITA)	Astana BePink Women's Team

== Season victories ==
Date	Race	Cat.	Rider	Country	Location
28 February	Vuelta Internacional Femenina a Costa Rica, Stage 3	2.2	Shelley Olds (USA)	Costa Rica	Parrita
2 March	Vuelta Internacional Femenina a Costa Rica, Stage 5	2.2	Shelley Olds (USA)	Costa Rica	San José
2 March	Vuelta Internacional Femenina a Costa Rica, Sprints classification	2.2	Shelley Olds (USA)	Costa Rica	
23 March	GP Comune di Cornaredo	1.2	Shelley Olds (USA)	Italy	Cornaredo
13 April	Energiewacht Tour, Sprints classification	2.2	Marta Tagliaferro (ITA)	Netherlands	
18 April	Winston-Salem Cycling Classic	1.2	Shelley Olds (USA)	United States	Winston-Salem
11 August	La Route de France, Stage 2	2.1	Barbara Guarischi (ITA)	France	Ligné
24 August	Trophée d'Or Féminin, Stage 3	2.2	Barbara Guarischi (ITA)	France	Saint-Germain-du-Puy
27 August	Trophée d'Or Féminin, Points classification	2.2	Barbara Guarischi (ITA)	France	Saint-Germain-du-Puy
27 August	Trophée d'Or Féminin, Teams classification	2.2	(Note: The riders on the squad were Barbara Guarischi, Małgorzata Jasińska, Ane Santesteban, Tatiana Guderzo, Elena Berlato and Marta Tagliaferro)	France	
