= List of wins by DSB Bank and its successors =

This is a comprehensive list of victories of the Liv Racing TeqFind cycling team. The races are categorized according to the UCI rules.

== 2006 – DSB Bank–Ballast Nedam ==
Cyclo-cross race in Pétange, Marianne Vos
Stage 5, Gracia–Orlová, Marianne Vos
Omloop van Borsele, Marianne Vos
Stage 1, Emakumeen Bira, Marianne Vos
Omloop van Valkenburg, Marianne Vos
Overall Tour Féminin en Limousin, Marianne Vos

Stage 1 and Stage 3, Marianne Vos

Criterium Steenwijk, Marianne Vos
Draai van de Kaai, Marianne Vos
Profronde van Oostvoorne, Marianne Vos
Criterium Pijnacker, Marianne Vos
Stage 4, Trophée d'Or Féminin, Marianne Vos

== 2007 – DSB–Bank ==
UCI Women's Road World Cup, Marianne Vos
La Flèche Wallonne Féminine (World Cup), Marianne Vos
Rund um die Nürnberger Altstadt, Marianne Vos
Ronde van Gelderland, Marianne Vos
Overall Gracia–Orlová, Andrea Bosman
Overall, Giro di San Marino Marianne Vos

Stage 1 ITT, 2 & 3 Giro di San Marino, Marianne Vos

Omloop van Borsele, Marianne Vos
Stage 1, 3, 4 & 7 Tour de l'Aude Cycliste Féminin, Marianne Vos
Stage 2 & 3 Emakumeen Bira, Marianne Vos
Overall Rabobank Ster Zeeuwsche Eilanden, Marianne Vos

Stage 1 & 2, Marianne Vos

Stage 2, Giro d'Italia Femminile, Marianne Vos
Profronde van Surhuisterveen, Adrie Visser
Ronde van Drenthe (World Cup), Adrie Visser
Profronde van Oostvoorne, Marianne Vos
Holland Hills Classic, Marianne Vos
Gouden Pijl Emmen, Christina Mods
Stage 1 & 4 Holland Ladies Tour, Marianne Vos

== 2008 – DSB–Bank ==
Dolmans Heuvelland Classic, Sharon Van Essen
Grand Prix de Dottignies, Marianne Vos
La Flèche Wallonne Féminine, Marianne Vos
Overall Gracia–Orlová, Marianne Vos

Stage 1, 2 & 3, Marianne Vos

Grand Prix de Santa Ana, Marianne Vos
Prologue, Stage 1 & 2 Vuelta Ciclista Femenina a el Salvador, Marianne Vos
Overall Emakumeen Bira, Marianne Vos

Stage 1, 2, 3a & 4, Marianne Vos

Overall Tour de Feminin — Krasna Lipa, Angela Brodtka-Hennig

Stage 2 & 3, Marianne Vos

Stage 4, Angela Brodtka-Hennig
Stage 1 Women's Tour of Britain, Andrea Bosman
Stage 1 International Thüringen Rundfahrt der Frauen, Angela Brodtka-Hennig
Stage 2 Albstadt-Frauen-Etappenrennen, Adrie Visser
Stage 2a Giro della Toscana Femminile, Marianne Vos

== 2009 – DSB Bank–LTO ==
Trofeo Alfredo Binda, Marianne Vos
Novilon Eurocup Ronde van Drenthe, Marianne Vos
La Flèche Wallonne Féminine, Marianne Vos
Stage 1 Gracia–Orlová, Marianne Vos
Stage 4 & 7 Tour de l'Aude Cycliste Féminin, Marianne Vos
7-Dorpenomloop Aalburg, Marianne Vos
Stage 4 Grande Boucle féminine, Marianne Vos
Overall Women's Tour of Britain, Liesbet De Vocht

Stage 1, Liesbet De Vocht
Stage 2, Janneke Kanis
Stage 3, 4a & 4b, Marianne Vos

Open de Suède Vårgårda, Marianne Vos
Draai van de Kaai, Marianne Vos
Ronde van Maastricht, Marianne Vos
Profronde van Oostvoorne, Marianne Vos
Holland Ladies Tour, Marianne Vos
Stage 4 & 5 Tour Cycliste Féminin International Ardèche, Angela Brodtka-Hennig
Stage 4 & 6 Giro della Toscana Femminile, Marianne Vos

== 2010 – Nederland Bloeit ==
Trofeo Alfredo Binda, Marianne Vos
Dolmans Heuvelland Classic, Liesbet De Vocht
Ronde van Drenthe, Loes Gunnewijk
Novilon Eurocup Ronde van Drenthe, Annemiek van Vleuten
Overall Gracia–Orlová, Marianne Vos

Stage 1, 4 & 5, Marianne Vos
Stage 2, Annemiek van Vleuten

Stage 8 Tour de l'Aude Cycliste Féminin, Marianne Vos
7-Dorpenomloop Aalburg, Marianne Vos
Durango-Durango Emakumeen Saria, Marianne Vos
Stage 1 & 3b Emakumeen Bira, Marianne Vos
Stage 4 Emakumeen Bira, Annemiek van Vleuten
Stage 3 Rabobank Ster Zeeuwsche Eilanden, Janneke Kanis
Stage 5 & 6 Giro d'Italia Femminile, Marianne Vos
Dwars door de Westhoek, Liesbet De Vocht
Draai van de Kaai, Marianne Vos
Ronde van Maastricht, Marianne Vos
Profronde van Oostvoorne, Marianne Vos
Overall Route de France, Annemiek van Vleuten

Stages 3 & 6, Marianne Vos
Stage 4, Annemiek van Vleuten

Overall Holland Ladies Tour, Marianne Vos

Stage 3 & 7, Marianne Vos

Stage 4 Giro della Toscana Femminile, Marianne Vos

== 2011 – Nederland Bloeit ==
Stage 1 & 4 Energiewacht Tour, Marianne Vos
Drentse 8 van Dwingeloo, Marianne Vos
Ronde van Drenthe, Marianne Vos
La Flèche Wallonne Féminine, Marianne Vos
Grand Prix Elsy Jacobs, Marianne Vos
Grand-Prix Nicolas Frantz, Marianne Vos
7-Dorpenomloop Aalburg, Marianne Vos
Gooik, Marianne Vos
G.P. Ciudad de Valladolid, Marianne Vos
Durango-Durango Emakumeen Saria, Marianne Vos
Overall Iurreta-Emakumeen Bira, Marianne Vos

Stages 1, 2 & 4, Marianne Vos

Overall Rabobank Ster Zeeuwsche Eilanden, Marianne Vos

Prologue & Stage 2, Marianne Vos

Overall Giro d'Italia Femminile, Marianne Vos

Stages 1, 3, 6, 7 & 9, Marianne Vos
Points classification, Marianne Vos
Mountain classification, Marianne Vos

Acht van Chaam, Marianne Vos
Open de Suède Vårgårda, Annemiek van Vleuten
Ronde van Maastricht, Marianne Vos
Profronde van Oostvoorne, Marianne Vos
Trophée d'Or Féminin, Marianne Vos
Overall Holland Ladies Tour, Marianne Vos

Stages 1, 5 & 6, Marianne Vos

Stage 3, Loes Gunnewijk

== 2012 – Stichting Rabo Women Cycling Team / Rabobank Women Cycling Team ==
Ronde van Drenthe, Marianne Vos
Novilon Eurocup Ronde van Drenthe, Marianne Vos
Trofeo Alfredo Binda, Marianne Vos
GP Stad Roeselare, Annemiek van Vleuten
Overall Festival Luxembourgeois du cyclisme féminin Elsy Jacobs, Marianne Vos

Prologue & Stage 2, Annemiek van Vleuten
Stage 1, Marianne Vos

Bredene, Liesbet De Vocht
Gooik, Liesbet De Vocht
GP Comune di Cornaredo, Iris Slappendel
Holland Hills Classic, Annemiek van Vleuten
7-Dorpenomloop Aalburg, Annemiek van Vleuten
Stage 4, Iurreta-Emakumeen Bira, Annemiek van Vleuten
Stage 1, Rabobank Ster Zeeuwsche Eilanden, Iris Slappendel
Overall Giro d'Italia Femminile, Marianne Vos

Stage 1, 2, 4, 7, & 8 Marianne Vos

Overall Tour Féminin en Limousin, Marianne Vos

Stage 1, Marianne Vos
Stage 4, Marianne Vos

Olympic Road Championship, Marianne Vos
2011 Open de Suède Vårgårda, Iris Slappendel
GP de Plouay, Marianne Vos
Prologue Giro della Toscana Femminile, Annemiek van Vleuten
Overall BrainWash Ladies Tour, Marianne Vos

Stage 4, Marianne Vos
Stage 6, Marianne Vos

== 2013 – Rabobank–Liv Giant ==
Drentse 8 van Dwingeloo, Marianne Vos
Ronde van Drenthe, Marianne Vos
Tour of Flanders – WE, Marianne Vos
Youth classification Energiewacht Tour, Jolanda Neff
2013 La Flèche Wallonne Féminine, Marianne Vos
Overall Festival Luxembourgeois du cyclisme féminin Elsy Jacobs, Marianne Vos

Points classification, Marianne Vos
Prologue, Annemiek van Vleuten
Stage 2, Marianne Vos

Rabobank 7-Dorpenomloop Aalburg, Marianne Vos
Durango-Durango Emakumeen Saria, Marianne Vos
Points classification Emakumeen Euskal Bira, Marianne Vos

Stage 1, Marianne Vos

Points classification Giro Rosa, Marianne Vos

Stages 3, 4 & 7, Marianne Vos

Stage 3 Thüringen Rundfahrt der Frauen, Annemiek van Vleuten
Open de Suède Vårgårda, Marianne Vos
Overall Trophée d'Or Féminin, Marianne Vos

Stages 1, 2 & 4, Marianne Vos
Stage 6, Annemiek van Vleuten

GP de Plouay, Marianne Vos
Individual ranking UCI Women's Road World Cup, Marianne Vos
Teams ranking UCI Women's Road World Cup
Prologue & Stage 2 Giro della Toscana Int. Femminile – Memorial Michela Fanini, Marianne Vos
Hertogenbosch Cyclo-cross, Marianne Vos
Round 1 UCI Cyclo-cross World Cup (Valkenberg), Marianne Vos
Woerden Cyclo-cross, Marianne Vos
Flamanville Cyclo-cross, Pauline Ferrand-Prévot

== 2014 – Rabo–Liv Women Cycling Team ==
Surhuisterveen Cyclo-cross, Marianne Vos
Leuven Cyclo-cross, Marianne Vos
Nommay Cyclo-cross, Marianne Vos
Overall Energiewacht Tour, Lucinda Brand

Young rider classification, Thalita de Jong
Stage 4, Lucinda Brand

La Flèche Wallonne Féminine, Pauline Ferrand-Prévot
Dwars door de Westhoek, Anna van der Breggen
Overall Festival Luxembourgeois du cyclisme féminin Elsy Jacobs, Anna van der Breggen

Points classification, Marianne Vos
Mountains classification, Pauline Ferrand-Prévot
Youth classification, Pauline Ferrand-Prévot
Prologue & Stage 2, Marianne Vos
Stage 1, Anna van der Breggen

Overall The Women's Tour, Marianne Vos

Points classification, Marianne Vos
Stages 3, 4 & 5, Marianne Vos

Lons-le-Saunier (Mountainbike), Pauline Ferrand-Prévot
Nove Mesto na Morave (Mountainbike), Pauline Ferrand-Prévot
Rabobank 7-Dorpenomloop Aalburg, Marianne Vos
Albstadt (Mountainbike), Pauline Ferrand-Prévot
Gooik–Geraardsbergen–Gooik, Marianne Vos
Durango-Durango Emakumeen Saria, Marianne Vos
Overall Emakumeen Euskal Bira, Pauline Ferrand-Prévot

Points classification, Marianne Vos
Mountains classification, Anna van der Breggen
Teams classification
Stages 1 & 3, Pauline Ferrand-Prévot
Stages 2 & 4, Marianne Vos

GP du Canton d'Argovie, Katarzyna Niewiadoma
Overall Giro d'Italia Femminile, Marianne Vos

Points classification, Marianne Vos
Young rider classification, Pauline Ferrand-Prévot
Prologue & Stage 3, Annemiek van Vleuten
Stages 1, 4, 5 & 7, Marianne Vos

La Course by Le Tour de France, Marianne Vos
Sparkassen Giro, Marianne Vos
Overall Ladies Tour of Norway, Anna van der Breggen

Points classification, Anna van der Breggen
Mountains classification, Katarzyna Niewiadoma
Youth classification, Katarzyna Niewiadoma
Teams classification
Prologue & Stage 2, Marianne Vos
Stage 1, Anna van der Breggen

Stage 7 La Route de France, Iris Slappendel
GP de Plouay, Lucinda Brand
Teams classification UCI Women's Road World Cup
Sprints classification UCI Women's Road World Cup, Iris Slappendel
Mountains classification Boels Rental Ladies Tour, Katarzyna Niewiadoma

Combativity award Stage 6, Roxane Knetemann
Stage 3, Marianne Vos

Overall Lotto Belisol Belgium Tour, Annemiek van Vleuten

Sprints classification, Thalita de Jong
Mountains classification, Anna van der Breggen
Young rider classification, Thalita de Jong
Teams classification
Prologue & Stage 1, Annemiek van Vleuten
Stage 2, TTT
Stage 4, Anna van der Breggen

Zilvermeercross, Sabrina Stultiens
Coupe de France Cycliste de Cyclo-Cross – Lanarvily, Pauline Ferrand-Prévot
UCI Cyclo-cross World Cup – Zolder, Marianne Vos
Superprestige – Diegem, Marianne Vos

== 2015 – Rabo–Liv Women Cycling Team ==
Internationale Centrumcross van Surhuisterveen, Marianne Vos
Omloop Het Nieuwsblad, Anna van der Breggen
Prologue & Stage 4 Energiewacht Tour, Anna van der Breggen
Stage 2b Energiewacht Tour, Lucinda Brand
La Flèche Wallonne Féminine, Anna van der Breggen
Overall Festival Luxembourgeois du cyclisme féminin Elsy Jacobs, Anna van der Breggen

Prologue, Anna van der Breggen

Overall Emakumeen Euskal Bira, Katarzyna Niewiadoma
Overall Giro d'Italia Femminile, Anna van der Breggen

Young rider classification, Katarzyna Niewiadoma
Stages 3 & 7, Lucinda Brand
Stage 5, Pauline Ferrand-Prévot
Stage 8 (ITT), Anna van der Breggen

La Course by Le Tour de France, Anna van der Breggen
Erondegemse Pijl, Thalita de Jong
Crescent Women World Cup Vårgårda, Team time trial
Stage 6 Holland Ladies Tour, Thalita de Jong
Stage 4 Belgium Tour, Anna van der Breggen

== 2016 – Rabo–Liv Women Cycling Team ==
Pajot Hills Classic, Marianne Vos
Salverda Omloop van de IJsseldelta, Anna van der Breggen
Ronde van Gelderland, Katarzyna Niewiadoma
La Flèche Wallonne Féminine, Anna van der Breggen
Overall Grand Prix Elsy Jacobs, Katarzyna Niewiadoma

Young rider classification, Katarzyna Niewiadoma
Stage 2, Katarzyna Niewiadoma

Rabobank 7-Dorpenomloop Aalburg, Marianne Vos
Stage 3 Tour of California, Marianne Vos
Keukens Van Lommel Ladies Classic, Marianne Vos
Stage 4 The Womens Tour, Marianne Vos
Overall Giro del Trentino Alto Adige-Südtirol, Katarzyna Niewiadoma

Stage 1, Katarzyna Niewiadoma
Stage 2a, Thalita de Jong
Stage 2b (TTT)

Stage 9 Giro d'Italia Internazionale Femminile, Katarzyna Niewiadoma
Stages 1, 3 & 5 Internationale Thüringen Rundfahrt der Frauen, Marianne Vos
Points classification Lotto–Belisol Belgium Tour, Marianne Vos

Sprints classification, Marianne Vos
Stage 2, Marianne Vos

Erondegemse Pijl (Erpe-Mere), Lucinda Brand
Overall Ladies Tour of Norway, Lucinda Brand

Points classification, Anouska Koster
Youth classification, Thalita de Jong
Teams classification
Stage 2, Lucinda Brand
Stage 3, Anouska Koster

Stage 3 Boels Rental Ladies Tour, Katarzyna Niewiadoma
Cauberg Cyclo-cross, Thalita de Jong
Grand Prix Eric De Vlaeminck, Marianne Vos

== 2017 – WM3 Pro Cycling ==
Grand Prix Sven Nys, Marianne Vos
Memorial Romano Scotti, Marianne Vos
Grand Prix Adrie van der Poel, Marianne Vos
Overall Bay Classic Series, Valentina Scandolara

Stage 1, Valentina Scandolara

EPZ Omloop van Borsele, Riejanne Markus
Overall Gracia–Orlová, Riejanne Markus

Stages 1 & 3 (ITT), Riejanne Markus
Stage 2, Anouska Koster

Trofee Maarten Wynants, Marianne Vos
Rabobank 7-Dorpenomloop Aalburg, Marianne Vos
Overall The Women's Tour, Katarzyna Niewiadoma

Stage 1, Katarzyna Niewiadoma

Overall BeNe Ladies Tour, Marianne Vos

Points classification, Marianne Vos
Sprints classification, Marianne Vos
Stages 2b (ITT) & 3, Marianne Vos

Overall Ladies Tour of Norway, Marianne Vos

Points classification, Marianne Vos

Combativity classification, Stage 6 Holland Ladies Tour, Katarzyna Niewiadoma
Overall Lotto Belisol Belgium Tour, Anouska Koster

Points classification, Marianne Vos
Youth classification, Anouska Koster
Team classification
Stage 1, Marianne Vos
Stage 3, Anouska Koster

== 2018 – WaowDeals Pro Cycling ==
Youth classification Women's Herald Sun Tour, Jeanne Korevaar
Time Trial, District Kampioenschap Zuid-Oost/Zuid-West, Pauliena Rooijakkers
Stage 1 Emakumeen Euskal Bira, Sabrina Stultiens
Points classification The Women's Tour, Marianne Vos

British rider classification, Dani Rowe
Team classification

Stage 8 Giro Rosa, Marianne Vos
Overall BeNe Ladies Tour, Marianne Vos

Sprints classification, Marianne Vos
Points classification, Marianne Vos
Stage 1, Marianne Vos

Open de Suède Vårgårda, Marianne Vos
Overall Ladies Tour of Norway, Marianne Vos

Points classification, Marianne Vos
Stages 1, 2 & 3, Marianne Vos

Stage 2 Belgium Tour, Jeanne Korevaar

== 2019 – CCC–Liv ==
Trofeo Alfredo Binda – Comune di Cittiglio, Marianne Vos
Overall Tour de Yorkshire Women's Race, Marianne Vos

Stage 2, Marianne Vos

Stage 1 Festival Elsy Jacobs, Marta Lach
Mountains classification Thüringen Rundfahrt der Frauen, Pauliena Rooijakkers
Stage 2 The Women's Tour, Marianne Vos
Stages 2, 3 & 7 Giro Rosa, Marianne Vos
La Course by Le Tour de France, Marianne Vos
Emakumeen Nafarroako Klasikoa, Ashleigh Moolman
Overall Ladies Tour of Norway, Marianne Vos

Stages 2, 3 & 4, Marianne Vos

Overall Tour Cycliste Féminin International de l'Ardèche, Marianne Vos

Points classification, Marianne Vos
Stages 1, 2, 3, 6 & 7, Marianne Vos

== 2020 – CCC–Liv ==
South Africa National Road Race Championships, Ashleigh Moolman

== 2021 – Liv Racing ==
Le Samyn, Lotte Kopecky
Stage 1 Holland Ladies Tour, Alison Jackson
La Classique Morbihan, Sofia Bertizzolo

== 2022 – Liv Racing–Xstra ==
Stage 3 Bloeizone Fryslân Tour, Rachele Barbieri
ZLM Omloop der Kempen Ladies, Rachele Barbieri
