= 2014 Trophée d'Or Féminin =

Race details
- Dates: 23–27 August 2013
- Stages: 6
- Distance: 497.9 km (309.4 mi)
- Winning time: 13h 12' 51"

Results
| Jersey awarded to the overall winner | Winner | Elisa Longo Borghini (ITA) | (Team Hitec Products) |
| | Second | Elena Berlato (ITA) | (Alé Cipollini) |
| | Third | Ann-Sophie Duyck (BEL) | (Belgium (national team)) |
| Jersey awarded to the points classification winner | Points | Barbara Guarischi (ITA) | (Alé Cipollini) |
| Jersey awarded to the mountains classification winner | Mountains | Elisa Longo Borghini (ITA) | (Team Hitec Products) |
| Jersey awarded to the youth classification winner | Youth | Anastasiia Iakovenko (RUS) | (Russia (national team)) |
| | Team | Alé Cipollini | |

The 2014 Trophée d'Or Féminin was the 18th edition of a women's cycle stage race held in France. The tour was held from 23 August to 27 August, 2014. The tour has an UCI rating of 2.2. The overall winner was Elisa Longo Borghini.

== Stages ==
=== Stage 1 ===
23 August Saint-Amand-Montrond to Graçay 113.4 km (70.5 mi)

Stage 1 result

| | Rider | Team | Time |
|---|---|---|---|
| 1 | Roxane Fournier (FRA) | Poitou–Charentes.Futuroscope.86 | 3h 07' 04" |
| 2 | Pascale Jeuland (FRA) | Poitou–Charentes.Futuroscope.86 | s.t. |
| 3 | Barbara Guarischi (ITA) | Alé Cipollini | s.t. |
| 4 | Loren Rowney (AUS) | Australia (National team) | s.t. |
| 5 | Kelly Druyts (BEL) | Topsport Vlaanderen-Pro-Duo | s.t. |
| 6 | Eugénie Duval (FRA) | Lointek | s.t. |
| 7 | Elisa Longo Borghini (ITA) | Team Hitec Products | s.t. |
| 8 | Sarah Roy (AUS) | Poitou–Charentes.Futuroscope.86 | s.t. |
| 9 | Sofie De Vuyst (BEL) | Belgium (National team) | s.t. |
| 10 | Sanne Cant (BEL) | Belgium (National team) | s.t. |

General classification after stage 1

| | Rider | Team | Time |
|---|---|---|---|
| 1 | Roxane Fournier (FRA) | Poitou–Charentes.Futuroscope.86 | 3h 06' 54" |
| 2 | Barbara Guarischi (ITA) | Alé Cipollini | + 3" |
| 3 | Pascale Jeuland (FRA) | Poitou–Charentes.Futuroscope.86 | + 4" |
| 4 | Elisa Longo Borghini (ITA) | Team Hitec Products | + 9" |
| 5 | Loren Rowney (AUS) | Australia (National team) | + 10" |
| 6 | Kelly Druyts (BEL) | Topsport Vlaanderen-Pro-Duo | + 10" |
| 7 | Eugénie Duval (NED) | Lointek | + 10" |
| 8 | Sarah Roy (AUS) | Poitou–Charentes.Futuroscope.86 | + 10" |
| 9 | Sofie De Vuyst (BEL) | Belgium (National team) | + 10" |
| 10 | Sanne Cant (BEL) | Belgium (National team) | + 10" |

=== Stage 2 ===
24 August Mehun-sur-Yèvre to Mehun sur Yèvre (ITT) 14.50 km (9.0 mi)

Stage 2 result

| | Rider | Team | Time |
|---|---|---|---|
| 1 | Ann-Sophie Duyck (BEL) | Belgium (National team) | 19' 28" |
| 2 | Lizzie Williams (AUS) | Australia (National team) | + 24" |
| 3 | Lija Laizāne (LAT) | Vaiano-Fondriest | + 24" |
| 4 | Rachel Neylan (AUS) | Australia (National team) | + 29" |
| 5 | Aude Biannic (FRA) | Lointek | + 29" |
| 6 | Joëlle Numainville (CAN) | Lotto Ladies | + 36" |
| 7 | Kataržina Sosna (LAT) | Vaiano-Fondriest | + 37" |
| 8 | Tetyana Ryabchenko (UKR) | S.C. Michela Fanini Rox | + 41" |
| 9 | Amy Cure (AUS) | Lotto Ladies | + 44" |
| 10 | Sarah Roy (AUS) | Poitou–Charentes.Futuroscope.86 | + 44" |

General classification after stage 2

| | Rider | Team | Time |
|---|---|---|---|
| 1 | Ann-Sophie Duyck (BEL) | Belgium (National team) | 3h 26' 32" |
| 2 | Lizzie Williams (AUS) | Australia (National team) | + 24" |
| 3 | Rachel Neylan (AUS) | Australia (National team) | + 29" |
| 4 | Aude Biannic (FRA) | Lointek | + 29" |
| 5 | Joëlle Numainville (CAN) | Lotto Ladies | + 36" |
| 6 | Kataržina Sosna (LTU) | Vaiano-Fondriest | + 37" |
| 7 | Tetyana Ryabchenko (UKR) | S.C. Michela Fanini Rox | + 41" |
| 8 | Sarah Roy (AUS) | Poitou–Charentes.Futuroscope.86 | + 44" |
| 9 | Elisa Longo Borghini (ITA) | Team Hitec Products | + 48" |
| 10 | Małgorzata Jasińska (POL) | Alé Cipollini | + 54" |

=== Stage 3 ===
24 August Saint-Germain-du-Puy to Saint-Germain-du-Puy 76.70 km (47.7 mi)

Stage 3 result

| | Rider | Team | Time |
|---|---|---|---|
| 1 | Barbara Guarischi (ITA) | Alé Cipollini | 1h 59' 47" |
| 2 | Kelly Druyts (BEL) | Topsport Vlaanderen-Pro-Duo | s.t. |
| 3 | Roxane Fournier (FRA) | Poitou–Charentes.Futuroscope.86 | s.t. |
| 4 | Aurore Verhoeven (FRA) | Lointek | s.t. |
| 5 | Aude Biannic (FRA) | Lointek | s.t. |
| 6 | Joëlle Numainville (CAN) | Lotto Ladies | s.t. |
| 7 | Pascale Jeuland (FRA) | Poitou–Charentes.Futuroscope.86 | s.t. |
| 8 | Fanny Riberot (FRA) | Lointek | s.t. |
| 9 | Yulia Ilinykh (RUS) | Bizkaia–Durango | s.t. |
| 10 | Elena Valentini (ITA) | BTC City Ljubljana | s.t. |

General classification after stage 3

| | Rider | Team | Time |
|---|---|---|---|
| 1 | Ann-Sophie Duyck (BEL) | Belgium (National team) | 5h 26' 19" |
| 2 | Lizzie Williams (AUS) | Australia (National team) | + 24" |
| 3 | Rachel Neylan (AUS) | Australia (National team) | + 29" |
| 4 | Aude Biannic (FRA) | Lointek | + 29" |
| 5 | Joëlle Numainville (CAN) | Lotto Ladies | + 36" |
| 6 | Kataržina Sosna (LTU) | Vaiano-Fondriest | + 37" |
| 7 | Sarah Roy (AUS) | Poitou–Charentes.Futuroscope.86 | + 44" |
| 8 | Elisa Longo Borghini (ITA) | Team Hitec Products | + 46" |
| 9 | Tetyana Ryabchenko (UKR) | S.C. Michela Fanini Rox | + 49" |
| 10 | Małgorzata Jasińska (POL) | Alé Cipollini | + 54" |

=== Stage 4 ===
25 August Cosne-Cours-sur-Loire to Cosne Cours Sur Loire 93.40 km (58.0 mi)

Stage 4 result

| | Rider | Team | Time |
|---|---|---|---|
| 1 | Elisa Longo Borghini (ITA) | Team Hitec Products | 2h 34' 11" |
| 2 | Elena Berlato (ITA) | Alé Cipollini | + 5" |
| 3 | Barbara Guarischi (ITA) | Alé Cipollini | + 1' 42" |
| 4 | Kelly Druyts (BEL) | Topsport Vlaanderen-Pro-Duo | + 1' 42" |
| 5 | Aude Biannic (FRA) | Lointek | + 1' 42" |
| 6 | Elena Valentini (ITA) | BTC City Ljubljana | + 1' 42" |
| 7 | Lizzie Williams (AUS) | Australia (National team) | + 1' 42" |
| 8 | Tatiana Guderzo (ITA) | Alé Cipollini | + 1' 42" |
| 9 | Kataržina Sosna (LTU) | Vaiano-Fondriest | + 1' 42" |
| 10 | Chiara Pierobon (ITA) | Top Girls Fassa Bortolo | + 1' 42". |

General classification after stage 4

| | Rider | Team | Time |
|---|---|---|---|
| 1 | Elisa Longo Borghini (ITA) | Team Hitec Products | 8h 01' 04" |
| 2 | Elena Berlato (ITA) | Alé Cipollini | + 32" |
| 3 | Ann-Sophie Duyck (BEL) | Belgium (National team) | + 1' 08" |
| 4 | Lizzie Williams (AUS) | Australia (National team) | + 1' 32" |
| 5 | Rachel Neylan (AUS) | Australia (National team) | + 1' 37" |
| 6 | Aude Biannic (FRA) | Lointek | + 1' 37" |
| 7 | Joëlle Numainville (CAN) | Lotto Ladies | + 1' 44" |
| 8 | Kataržina Sosna (LTU) | Vaiano-Fondriest | + 1' 45" |
| 9 | Sarah Roy (AUS) | Poitou–Charentes.Futuroscope.86 | + 1' 52" |
| 10 | Tetyana Ryabchenko (UKR) | S.C. Michela Fanini Rox | + 1' 57" |

=== Stage 5 ===
26 August Avord to Avord 114.10 km (70.9 mi)

Stage 5 result

| | Rider | Team | Time |
|---|---|---|---|
| 1 | Pascale Jeuland (FRA) | Poitou–Charentes.Futuroscope.86 | 2h 56' 22" |
| 2 | Shana van Glabeke (BEL) | Belgium (National team) | s.t. |
| 3 | Lizzie Williams (AUS) | Australia (National team) | s.t. |
| 4 | Joëlle Numainville (CAN) | Lotto–Belisol Ladies | s.t. |
| 5 | Roxane Fournier (FRA) | Poitou–Charentes.Futuroscope.86 | s.t. |
| 6 | Barbara Guarischi (ITA) | Alé Cipollini | s.t. |
| 7 | Kelly Druyts (BEL) | Topsport Vlaanderen-Pro-Duo | s.t. |
| 8 | Elisa Longo Borghini (ITA) | Team Hitec Products | s.t. |
| 9 | Aurore Verhoeven (FRA) | Lointek | s.t. |
| 10 | Lara Vieceli (ITA) | S.C. Michela Fanini Rox | s.t. |

General classification after stage 5

| | Rider | Team | Time |
|---|---|---|---|
| 1 | Elisa Longo Borghini (ITA) | Team Hitec Products | 10h 57' 26" |
| 2 | Elena Berlato (ITA) | Alé Cipollini | + 32" |
| 3 | Ann-Sophie Duyck (BEL) | Belgium (National team) | + 1' 08" |
| 4 | Lizzie Williams (AUS) | Australia (National team) | + 1' 28" |
| 5 | Rachel Neylan (AUS) | Australia (National team) | + 1' 37" |
| 6 | Aude Biannic (FRA) | Lointek | + 1' 37" |
| 7 | Joëlle Numainville (CAN) | Lotto Ladies | + 1' 44" |
| 8 | Kataržina Sosna (LTU) | Vaiano-Fondriest | + 1' 45" |
| 9 | Sarah Roy (AUS) | Poitou–Charentes.Futuroscope.86 | + 1' 52" |
| 10 | Tetyana Ryabchenko (UKR) | S.C. Michela Fanini Rox | + 1' 57" |

=== Stage 6 ===
27 August Orval to Saint-Amand-Montrond 85.8 km (53.3 mi)

Stage 6 result

| | Rider | Team | Time |
|---|---|---|---|
| 1 | Kelly Druyts (BEL) | Topsport Vlaanderen-Pro-Duo | 2h 15' 25" |
| 2 | Barbara Guarischi (ITA) | Alé Cipollini | s.t. |
| 3 | Lizzie Williams (AUS) | Australia (National team) | s.t. |
| 4 | Pascale Jeuland (FRA) | Poitou–Charentes.Futuroscope.86 | s.t. |
| 5 | Lara Vieceli (ITA) | S.C. Michela Fanini Rox | s.t. |
| 6 | Svetlana Vasilieva (RUS) | Russia (National team) | s.t. |
| 7 | Joëlle Numainville (CAN) | Lotto–Belisol Ladies | s.t. |
| 8 | Chiara Pierobon (ITA) | Top Girls Fassa Bortolo | s.t. |
| 9 | Elisa Longo Borghini (ITA) | Team Hitec Products | s.t. |
| 10 | Sanne Cant (BEL) | Belgium (National team) | s.t. |

Final general classification

| | Rider | Team | Time |
|---|---|---|---|
| 1 | Elisa Longo Borghini (ITA) | Team Hitec Products | 13h 12' 51" |
| 2 | Elena Berlato (ITA) | Alé Cipollini | + 32" |
| 3 | Ann-Sophie Duyck (BEL) | Belgium (National team) | + 1' 08" |
| 4 | Lizzie Williams (AUS) | Australia (National team) | + 1' 24" |
| 5 | Rachel Neylan (AUS) | Australia (National team) | + 1' 37" |
| 6 | Joëlle Numainville (CAN) | Lotto Ladies | + 1' 44" |
| 7 | Kataržina Sosna (LTU) | Vaiano-Fondriest | + 1' 45" |
| 8 | Sarah Roy (AUS) | Poitou–Charentes.Futuroscope.86 | + 1' 52" |
| 9 | Tetyana Ryabchenko (UKR) | S.C. Michela Fanini Rox | + 1' 57" |
| 10 | Małgorzata Jasińska (POL) | Alé Cipollini | + 1' 58" |

== Classification leadership ==
| Stage | Winner | General classification | Points classification | Mountains classification | Youth classification | Teams classification |
|---|---|---|---|---|---|---|
| 1 | Roxane Fournier | Roxane Fournier | Roxane Fournier | Elisa Longo Borghini | Eugénie Duval | Poitou–Charentes.Futuroscope.86 |
| 2 (ITT) | Ann-Sophie Duyck | Ann-Sophie Duyck | Roxane Fournier | Elisa Longo Borghini | Anastasiia Iakovenko | Australia (National team) |
| 3 | Barbara Guarischi | Ann-Sophie Duyck | Roxane Fournier | Elisa Longo Borghini | Anastasiia Iakovenko | Australia (National team) |
| 4 | Elisa Longo Borghini | Elisa Longo Borghini | Barbara Guarischi | Elisa Longo Borghini | Anastasiia Iakovenko | Alé Cipollini |
| 5 | Pascale Jeuland | Elisa Longo Borghini | Barbara Guarischi | Elisa Longo Borghini | Anastasiia Iakovenko | Alé Cipollini |
| 6 | Kelly Druyts | Elisa Longo Borghini | Barbara Guarischi | Elisa Longo Borghini | Anastasiia Iakovenko | Alé Cipollini |
| Final | | Elisa Longo Borghini | Barbara Guarischi | Elisa Longo Borghini | Anastasiia Iakovenko | Alé Cipollini |
