= 2013–14 cyclo-cross season =

The 2013–2014 cyclo-cross season consists of three international series conducted in the bicycle racing discipline of cyclo-cross:

- World Cup
- Superprestige
- BPost Bank Trophy

The season began on 13 October with the GP Mario De Clercq, won by Sven Nys. It is scheduled to end on 23 February 2013.

== Race calendar ==
UCI World Championship
UCI World Cup
Superprestige
bpost bank trophy

Date	Race	Location	Winner	Second	Third
13 October	(Belgium) GP Mario De Clercq	Ronse	Sven Nys (BEL)	Martin Bína (CZE)	Niels Albert (BEL)
20 October	(Netherlands) Valkenburg Cyclo-cross	Valkenburg	Lars van der Haar (NED)	Kevin Pauwels (BEL)	Philipp Walsleben (GER)
26 October	(Czech Republic) Cyklokros Tábor	Tábor	Lars van der Haar (NED)	Philipp Walsleben (GER)	Kevin Pauwels (BEL)
27 October	(Belgium) Cyclo-cross Ruddervoorde	Ruddervoorde	Klaas Vantornout (BEL)	Sven Nys (BEL)	Tom Meeusen (BEL)
1 November	(Belgium) Koppenbergcross	Oudenaarde	Tom Meeusen (BEL)	Kevin Pauwels (BEL)	Klaas Vantornout (BEL)
3 November	(Belgium) Cyclo-cross Zonhoven	Zonhoven	Sven Nys (BEL)	Niels Albert (BEL)	Klaas Vantornout (BEL)
10 November	(Belgium) Bollekescross	Hamme	Niels Albert (BEL)	Sven Nys (BEL)	Philipp Walsleben (GER)
16 November	(Belgium) Grand Prix van Hasselt	Hasselt	Sven Nys (BEL)	Niels Albert (BEL)	Klaas Vantornout (BEL)
17 November	(Belgium) Cyclo-cross Gavere	Gavere	Sven Nys (BEL)	Philipp Walsleben (GER)	Klaas Vantornout (BEL)
23 November	(Belgium) Duinencross Koksijde	Koksijde	Niels Albert (BEL)	Francis Mourey (FRA)	Philipp Walsleben (GER)
24 November	(Netherlands) Superprestige Gieten	Gieten	Niels Albert (BEL)	Lars van der Haar (NED)	Tom Meeusen (BEL)
21 December	(Belgium) Grand Prix Rouwmoer	Essen	Kevin Pauwels (BEL)	Sven Nys (BEL)	Niels Albert (BEL)
22 December	(Belgium) Cyclo-cross Namur	Namur	Francis Mourey (FRA)	Klaas Vantornout (BEL)	Niels Albert (BEL)
26 December	(Belgium) Grand Prix Erik De Vlaeminck	Heusden-Zolder	Lars van der Haar (NED)	Martin Bína (CZE)	Zdeněk Štybar (CZE)
27 December	(Belgium) Azencross	Wuustwezel	Sven Nys (BEL)	Rob Peeters (BEL)	Niels Albert (BEL)
29 December	(Belgium) Superprestige Diegem	Diegem	Sven Nys (BEL)	Tom Meeusen (BEL)	Niels Albert (BEL)
1 January	(Belgium) Grand Prix Sven Nys	Baal	Sven Nys (BEL)	Zdeněk Štybar (CZE)	Niels Albert (BEL)
5 January	(Italy) Memorial Romano Scotti	Rome	Niels Albert (BEL)	Lars van der Haar (NED)	Sven Nys (BEL)
26 January	(France) Grand Prix Nommay	Nommay	Tom Meeusen (BEL)	Francis Mourey (FRA)	Philipp Walsleben (GER)
2 February	(Netherlands) World Championships	Hoogerheide	Zdeněk Štybar (CZE)	Sven Nys (BEL)	Kevin Pauwels (BEL)
8 February	(Belgium) Krawatencross	Lille	Sven Nys (BEL)	Lars van der Haar (NED)	Tom Meeusen (BEL)
9 February	(Belgium) Vlaamse Aardbeiencross	Hoogstraten	Sven Nys (BEL)	Klaas Vantornout (BEL)	Niels Albert (BEL)
15 February	(Belgium) Noordzeecross	Middelkerke	Tom Meeusen (BEL)	Kevin Pauwels (BEL)	Sven Nys (BEL)
23 February	(Belgium) Sluitingsprijs Oostmalle	Oostmalle	Niels Albert (BEL)	Tom Meeusen (BEL)	Kevin Pauwels (BEL)

=== National Championships ===
Nation	Men's winner	Women's winner
Austria	Daniel Geismayr	Nadja Heigl
Belgium	Sven Nys	Sanne Cant
Canada	Geoff Kabush	Catharine Pendrel
Croatia	Bruno Radotić	Mia Radotić
Czech Republic	Martin Bína	Martina Mikulášková
Denmark	Jonas Pedersen	Annika Langvad
Finland	Samuel Pökälä	Jasmin Kansikas
France	Francis Mourey	Pauline Ferrand-Prévot
Germany	Philipp Walsleben	Hanka Kupfernagel
Great Britain	Ian Field	Helen Wyman
Hungary	Gábor Fejes	Barbara Benkó
Ireland	Rodger Aiken	Francine Meehan
Italy	Marco Aurelio Fontana	Eva Lechner
Japan	Yu Takenouchi	Sakiko Miyauchi
Luxembourg	Christian Helmig	Christine Majerus
Netherlands	Lars van der Haar	Marianne Vos
Poland	Marek Konwa	Paula Gorycka
Portugal	Vitor Santos	Isabel Caetano
Slovakia	Martin Haring	Tereza Medveďová
Spain	Javier Ruiz de Larrinaga	Aida Nuño
Sweden	Calle Friberg	Emma Johansson
Switzerland	Lukas Flückiger	Sina Frei
United States	Jeremy Powers	Katie Compton

== See also ==
- 2014 UCI Cyclo-cross World Championships
- 2012–2013 cyclo-cross season
- 2014–15 cyclo-cross season
