= 2014–15 cyclo-cross season =

The 2014-2015 cyclo-cross season consists of three international series conducted in the bicycle racing discipline of cyclo-cross:

- World Cup
- Superprestige
- BPost Bank Trophy

The season began on 5 October with the Superprestige Gieten, won by Mathieu van der Poel. It ended on 14 February 2015.

== Race calendar ==
UCI World Championship
UCI World Cup
Superprestige
bpost bank trophy

Date	Race	Location	Winner	Second	Third
5 Oct	(Netherlands) Superprestige Gieten	Gieten	Mathieu van der Poel (NED)	Lars van der Haar (NED)	Sven Nys (BEL)
12 Oct	(Belgium) GP Mario De Clercq	Ronse	Sven Nys (BEL)	Mathieu van der Poel (NED)	Klaas Vantornout (BEL)
19 Oct	(Netherlands) Cauberg Cyclo-cross	Valkenburg	Lars van der Haar (NED)	Kevin Pauwels (BEL)	Corné van Kessel (NED)
1 Nov	(Belgium) Koppenbergcross	Oudenaarde	Wout Van Aert (BEL)	Sven Nys (BEL)	Kevin Pauwels (BEL)
2 Nov	(Belgium) Cyclo-cross Zonhoven	Zonhoven	Kevin Pauwels (BEL)	Sven Nys (BEL)	Lars van der Haar (NED)
9 Nov	(Belgium) Cyclo-cross Ruddervoorde	Ruddervoorde	Tom Meeusen (BEL)	Mathieu van der Poel (NED)	Klaas Vantornout (BEL)
16 Nov	(Belgium) Cyclo-cross Gavere	Gavere	Klaas Vantornout (BEL)	Kevin Pauwels (BEL)	Sven Nys (BEL)
22 Nov	(Belgium) Duinencross Koksijde	Koksijde	Wout Van Aert (BEL)	Kevin Pauwels (BEL)	Mathieu van der Poel (NED)
23 Nov	(Belgium) Grand Prix de la Région Wallonne	Francorchamps	Kevin Pauwels (BEL)	Lars van der Haar (NED)	Tom Meeusen (BEL)
29 Nov	(United Kingdom) Milton Keynes Cyclo-cross	Milton Keynes	Kevin Pauwels (BEL)	Klaas Vantornout (BEL)	Francis Mourey (FRA)
30 Nov	(Belgium) Bollekescross	Hamme	Wout Van Aert (BEL)	Mathieu van der Poel (NED)	Philipp Walsleben (GER)
6 Dec	(Belgium) Grand Prix van Hasselt	Hasselt	Kevin Pauwels (BEL)	Wout Van Aert (BEL)	Tom Meeusen (BEL)
20 Dec	(Belgium) Grand Prix Rouwmoer	Essen	Wout Van Aert (BEL)	Tom Meeusen (BEL)	Rob Peeters (BEL)
21 Dec	(Belgium) Cyclo-cross Namur	Namur	Kevin Pauwels (BEL)	Lars van der Haar (NED)	Philipp Walsleben (GER)
26 Dec	(Belgium) Grand Prix Erik De Vlaeminck	Heusden-Zolder	Lars van der Haar (NED)	Kevin Pauwels (BEL)	Corné van Kessel (NED)
28 Dec	(Belgium) Superprestige Diegem	Diegem	Mathieu van der Poel (NED)	Tom Meeusen (BEL)	Kevin Pauwels (BEL)
30 Dec	(Belgium) Azencross	Wuustwezel	Wout Van Aert (BEL)	Mathieu van der Poel (NED)	Tom Meeusen (BEL)
1 Jan	(Belgium) Grand Prix Sven Nys	Baal	Wout Van Aert (BEL)	Lars van der Haar (NED)	Kevin Pauwels (BEL)
25 Jan	(Netherlands) Grand Prix Adri van der Poel	Hoogerheide	Mathieu van der Poel (NED)	Wout Van Aert (BEL)	Gianni Vermeersch (BEL)
1 Feb	(Czech Republic) World Championships	Tábor	Mathieu van der Poel (NED)	Wout Van Aert (BEL)	Lars van der Haar (NED)
7 Feb	(Belgium) Krawatencross	Lille	Mathieu van der Poel (NED)	Wout Van Aert (BEL)	Sven Nys (BEL)
8 Feb	(Belgium) Vlaamse Aardbeiencross	Hoogstraten	Mathieu van der Poel (NED)	Kevin Pauwels (BEL)	Wout Van Aert (BEL)
14 Feb	(Belgium) Noordzeecross	Middelkerke	Kevin Pauwels (BEL)	Mathieu van der Poel (NED)	Wout Van Aert (BEL)

=== National Championships ===
Nation	Men's winner	Women's winner
Austria	Alexander Gehbauer	
Belgium	Klaas Vantornout	
Canada	Raphaël Gagné	Mical Dyck
Croatia		
Czech Republic	Adam Toupalik	
Denmark	Benjamin Wittrup Justesen	
Finland		
France	Clément Lhotellerie	
Germany	Marcel Meisen	
Great Britain	Ian Field	Helen Wyman
Hungary	Gábor Fejes	
Ireland	David Montgomery	
Italy	Marco Aurelio Fontana	
Japan	Yu Takenouchi	
Luxembourg	Christian Helmig	
Netherlands	Mathieu van der Poel	
Poland	Marek Konwa	
Portugal	Mário Luis Miranda Costa	
Slovakia		
Spain	Aitor Hernandez Gutierrez	
Sweden		
Switzerland	Julien Taramarcaz	
United States	Jeremy Powers	

== See also ==
- 2015 UCI Cyclo-cross World Championships
- 2013–14 cyclo-cross season
- 2014–15 in women's Cyclo-cross season
