= 2014–15 in women's cyclo-cross =

Period in women's cyclo-cross

2014–15 in women's cyclo-cross covers the 2014–15 cyclo-cross season, which bridges the 2014 and 2015 road cycling seasons and mirrors the men's 2014–15 cyclo-cross season. The Cyclo-cross season consists of three major international race series, along with the World Championships. Cyclo-cross, like road cycling, is governed by the UCI.

== World Championships ==
Date	Championships	Winner	Nationality
31 January–1 February	World Cyclo-cross Championship	Pauline Ferrand-Prévot	France

== UCI Cyclo-cross World Cup ==
Date	Venue	Winner	Team	Series Leader
19 October	(Netherlands) Valkenburg	Katie Compton (USA)	Trek Factory Racing	Katie Compton (USA)
22 November	(Belgium) Koksijde	Sanne Cant (BEL)	Enertherm – BKCP	Sophie de Boer (BEL)
29 November	(United Kingdom) Milton Keynes	Sanne Cant (BEL)	Enertherm – BKCP	Sanne Cant (BEL)
21 December	(Belgium) Namur	Kateřina Nash (CZE)	Luna Pro Team	Sanne Cant (BEL)
26 December	(Belgium) Heusden-Zolder	Marianne Vos (NED)	Rabobank-Liv Woman Cycling Team	Sanne Cant (BEL)
25 January	(Netherlands) Hoogerheide	Eva Lechner (ITA)		Sanne Cant (BEL)
Champion				Sanne Cant (BEL)

== Cyclo-cross Superprestige ==
Date	Venue	Winner	Team	Series Leader
5 October	(Netherlands) Gieten	Sanne Cant (BEL)	Enertherm – BKCP	Sanne Cant (BEL)
2 November	(Belgium) Zonhoven	Sanne Cant (BEL)	Enertherm – BKCP	Sanne Cant (BEL)
9 November	(Belgium) Ruddervoorde	Sanne Cant (BEL)	Enertherm – BKCP	Sanne Cant (BEL)
16 November	(Belgium) Gavere	Sanne Cant (BEL)	Enertherm – BKCP	Sanne Cant (BEL)
23 November	(Belgium) Spa-Francorchamps	Nikki Harris (GBR)	VZW Young Telenet Fidea Cycling Team	Sanne Cant (BEL)
28 December	(Belgium) Diegem	Marianne Vos (NED)	Rabobank-Liv Woman Cycling Team	Sanne Cant (BEL)
8 February	(Belgium) Hoogstraten			
15 February	(Belgium) Middelkerke			

== BPost Bank Trophy ==
Date	Venue	Winner	Team	Series Leader
12 October	GP Mario De Clercq, Ronse	Sophie de Boer (BEL)	Kalas-NNOF Cycling Team	Sophie de Boer (BEL)
1 November	Koppenbergcross, Oudenaarde	Sophie de Boer (BEL)	Kalas-NNOF Cycling Team	Sophie de Boer (BEL)
30 November	Bollekescross, Hamme	Sanne Cant (BEL)	Enertherm – BKCP	Sophie de Boer (BEL)
6 December	Grand Prix van Hasselt, Hasselt	Sanne Cant (BEL)	Enertherm – BKCP	Sophie de Boer (BEL)
20 December	Grand Prix Rouwmoer, Essen	Sophie de Boer (BEL)	Kalas-NNOF Cycling Team	Sophie de Boer (BEL)
30 December	Azencross, Wuustwezel	Kateřina Nash (CZE)	Luna Pro Team	Sophie de Boer (BEL)
1 January	Grand Prix Sven Nys, Baal	Kateřina Nash (CZE)	Luna Pro Team	Ellen Van Loy (BEL)
7 February	Krawatencross, Lille			

== Other races ==
Date	Race name	Location	UCI Rating	Winner	Team
August
30 August	QianSen Trophy Cyclocross Yanqing Station	China	C1	Ellen Van Loy (BEL)	VZW Young Telenet Fidea Cycling Team
September
6 September	Nittany Lion Cross 1	United States	C2	Gabriella Durrin (GBR)	
7 September	Nittany Lion Cross 2	United States	C2	Laura Van Gilder (USA)	
10 September	Clif Bar CrossVegas	United States	C1	Meredith Miller (USA)	Noosa Professional Cyclocross
13 September	US Open of Cyclo-cross	United States	C2	Katie Compton (USA)	Trek Factory Racing
14 September	Boulder Cup	United States	C1	Katie Compton (USA)	Trek Factory Racing
14 September	EKZ CrossTour — Dielsdorf	Switzerland	C1	Eva Lechner (ITA)	RusVelo
20 September	Charm City Cross 1	United States	C1	Helen Wyman (GBR)	Kona FFSA Factory Team
20 September	Trek CXC Cup 1	United States	C1	Katie Compton (USA)	Trek Factory Racing
21 September	Charm City Cross 2	United States	C2	Helen Wyman (GBR)	Kona FFSA Factory Team
21 September	Trek CXC Cup 2	United States	C2	Katie Compton (USA)	Trek Factory Racing
27 September	Gran Prix of Gloucester 1	United States	C2	Katie Compton (USA)	Trek Factory Racing
27 September	SOUDAL GP Neerpelt	Belgium	C2	Sanne Cant (BEL)	Enertherm – BKCP
28 September	Gran Prix of Gloucester 2	United States	C1	Caroline Mani (FRA)	Raleigh/Clement
28 September	Radcross Illnau	Switzerland	C2	Marlene Petit (FRA)	
October
4 October	Providence Cyclo-Cross Festival 1	United States	C1	Katie Compton (USA)	Trek Factory Racing
4 October	Trek CXC Cup 2	United States	C1	Katie Compton (USA)	Trek Factory Racing
5 October	EKZ CrossTour — Dielsdorf	Switzerland	C1	Eva Lechner (ITA)	RusVelo
5 October	Providence Cyclo-Cross Festival 2	United States	C1	Katie Compton (USA)	Trek Factory Racing
11 October	Full Moon Vista — Ellison Park Cyclocross Festival 1	United States	C1	Caroline Mani (FRA)	Raleigh/Clement
11 October	Grote Prijs van Brabant	Netherlands	C2	Helen Wyman (GBR)	Kona FFSA Factory Team
12 October	Full Moon Vista — Ellison Park Cyclocross Festival 2	United States	C1	Caroline Mani (FRA)	Raleigh/Clement
12 October	Kronborg Cyclo Cross	Denmark	C2	Ida Jansson (SWE)	
12 October	GP 5 Sterne Region	Switzerland	C2	Elena Valentini (ITA)	BTC City Ljubljana
18 October	HPCX 1	United States	C2	Laura Van Gilder (USA)	
19 October	HPCX 2	United States	C2	Cassandra Maximenko (USA)	Rare Vos Racing/Van Dessel/Powe
21 October	Kiremko Nacht van Woerden	Netherlands	C2	Ellen Van Loy (BEL)	VZW Young Telenet Fidea Cycling Team
25 October	Gateway Cross Cup	United States	C2	Erica Zaveta (USA)	Team Redline
26 October	National Trophy Series Round 2	United Kingdom	C2	Adela Carter (GBR)	
26 October	Gateway Cross Cup	United States	C2	Sunny Gilbert (USA)	Michelob Ultra – Big Shark Racing
26 October	Manitoba Grand Prix of Cyclocross	Canada	C2	Catharine Pendrel (USA)	Luna Pro Team
26 October	Giro d'Italia Cross 1 – Fiuggi	Italy	C2	Alice Maria Arzuffi (ITA)	Selle Italia-Guerciotti
31 October	Cincy3 Harbin Park	United States	C2	Kateřina Nash (CZE)	Luna Pro Team
November
1 November	Cincy3 – Kings CX After Dark	United States	C1	Kateřina Nash (CZE)	Luna Pro Team
1 November	The Cycle-Smart International 1	United States	C2	Gabriella Durrin (GBR)	
2 November	The Cycle-Smart International 2	United States	C2	Cassandra Maximenko (USA)	Rare Vos Racing/Van Dessel/Powe
2 November	Giro d'Italia Cross 2 – Portoferraio	Italy	C2	Chiara Teocchi (ITA)	
2 November	EKZ CrossTour — Hittnau	Switzerland	C1	Sina Frei (SUI)	
8 November	Derby City Cup 1	United States	C2	Kateřina Nash (CZE)	Luna Pro Team
9 November	Cyclo-cross de Primel	France	C2	Lucie Chainel-Lefevre (FRA)	
9 November	Derby City Cup 2	United States	C2	Kateřina Nash (CZE)	Luna Pro Team
11 November	Quelneuc	France	C2	Lucie Chainel-Lefevre (FRA)	
11 November	Soudal Classics – Jaarmarktcross Niel	Belgium	C2	Sanne Cant (BEL)	Enertherm–BKCP
14 November	Jingle Cross 1	United States	C2	Kateřina Nash (CZE)	Luna Pro Team
15 November	Jingle Cross 2	United States	C2	Kateřina Nash (CZE)	Luna Pro Team
16 November	Coupe de France La France Cycliste de Cyclo-Cross	France	C2	Lucie Chainel-Lefevre (FRA)	
16 November	Jingle Cross 3	United States	C2	Courtenay Mcfadden (USA)	
22 November	Supercross Cup 1	United States	C2	Arley Kemmerer (USA)	
22 November	CXLA Weekend: Day 1	United States	C2	Kateřina Nash (CZE)	Luna Pro Team
23 November	KANSAI Cyclo Cross MAKINO Round	Japan	C2	Alice Maria Arzuffi (ITA)	Selle Italia-Guerciotti
23 November	Schlosscross	Switzerland	C2	Elena Valentini (ITA)	
23 November	CXLA Weekend — Day 2	United States	C2	Kateřina Nash (CZE)	Luna Pro Team
23 November	Supercross Cup 2	United States	C2	Arley Kemmerer (USA)	
29 November	Shinshu Cyclocross Nobeyama Kogen Round 1	Japan	C2	Alice Maria Arzuffi (ITA)	Selle Italia-Guerciotti
29 November	Baystate Cyclo-cross	United States	C2	Ellen Noble (USA)	JAM Fund / NCC
30 November	National Trophy Series Round – Milton Keynes	United Kingdom	C2	Katie Compton (USA)	Trek Factory Racing
30 November	Baystate Cyclo-cross — NECX	United States	C2	Ellen Noble (USA)	
30 November	Shinshu Cyclocross Nobeyama Kogen Round 2	Japan	C2	Alice Maria Arzuffi (ITA)	Selle Italia-Guerciotti
30 November	Trofeo Coop Ed. Brugherio 82 – Memorial Berionni & Perego	Italy	C2	Anna Oberparleiter (ITA)	
December
6 December	NEPCX — NBX Gran Prix of Cross — Day 1	United States	C2	Crystal Anthony (USA)	
6 December	Waves for Water Cyclo-cross Collaboration 1	United States	C2	Rachel Lloyd (USA)	
7 December	Waves for Water Cyclo-cross Collaboration 2	United States	C2	Rachel Lloyd (USA)	
7 December	Tappa — Giro d'Italia Cross 3	Italy	C2	Eva Lechner (ITA)	RusVelo
7 December	NEPCX — NBX Gran Prix of Cross — Day 2	United States	C2	Ellen Noble (USA)	
7 December	Vlaamse Druivencross	Belgium	C1	Sanne Cant (BEL)	Enertherm – BKCP
8 December	Ciclocross Del Ponte	Italy	C2	Eva Lechner (ITA)	RusVelo
13 December	Scheldecross Antwerpen	Belgium	C1	Sanne Cant (BEL)	Enertherm – BKCP
13 December	North Carolina Grand Prix — Race 1	United States	C2	Beth Ann Orton (USA)	
14 December	Zilvermeercross	Belgium	C2	Sabrina Stultiens (NED)	Rabobank-Liv Woman Cycling Team
14 December	EKZ CrossTour — Eschenbach	Italy	C1	Lucie Chainel Lefevre (FRA)	
14 December	Coupe de France La France Cycliste de Cyclo-Cross – Lanarvily	France	C2	Pauline Ferrand-Prévot (FRA)	Rabobank-Liv Woman Cycling Team
14 December	Tappa — Giro d'Italia Cross 4	Italy	C2	Chiara Teocchi (ITA)	
17 December	Cyclocross van het Waasland	Belgium	C2	Sanne Cant (BEL)	Enertherm – BKCP
26 December	Internationales Radquer Dagmersellen	Switzerland	C2	Juliette Labous (FRA)	
January
2 January	Radquer Bussnang	Switzerland	C1	Sina Frei (SUI)	
2 January	Internationale Centrumcross van Surhuisterveen	Netherlands	C2	Marianne Vos (NED)	Rabobank-Liv Woman Cycling Team
3 January	Resolution 'Cross Cup 1	United States	C2	Crystal Anthony (USA)	
3 January	Kingsport Cyclo-cross Cup	United States	C2	Allison Arensman (USA)	
4 January	SOUDAL Cyclocross Leuven	Belgium	C1	Sabrina Stultiens (NED)	Team Liv–Plantur
4 January	Resolution 'Cross Cup 2	United States	C2	Ellen Noble (USA)	
6 January	Tappa — Giro d'Italia Cross 5	Italy	C1	Eva Lechner (ITA)	
12 January	Cyclocross Otegem	Belgium	C2	Sanne Cant (BEL)	Enertherm – BKCP
17 January	Gran Premio Mamma E Papa Guerciotti AM	Italy	C2	Alice Maria Arzuffi (ITA)	Selle Italia-Guerciotti
18 January	Cyclo-cross International de Nommay	France	C2	Lucie Chainel-Lefevre (FRA)	
24 January	Internationale Cyclo-Cross Rucphen	Netherlands	C2	Nikki Harris (GBR)	VZW Young Telenet Fidea Cycling Team
February
4 February	Parkcross Maldegem	Belgium	C2		
21 February	Boels Classic Internationale Cyclo-cross Heerlen	Netherlands	C2		

Results Source: Calendar Source:

== Continental Championships ==
Date	Championships	Winner	Nationality
2 November	Pan-American Continental Cyclo-Cross Championships	Katie Compton	United States
8 November	European Continental Cyclo-Cross Championships	Sanne Cant	Belgium
8 November	European U23 Continental Cyclo-Cross Championships	Sabrina Stultiens	Netherlands

== National Championships ==
Date	National Championships	Winner	Team
25 October	Canada	Catharine Pendrel	Luna Pro Team
15 November	Sweden	Ida Jansson	
13 December	Slovakia	Janka Keseg Stevkova	
13 December	Czech	Kateřina Nash	Luna Pro Team
14 December	Japan	Ayako Toyooka	
10 January	Spain	Rocio Gamonal	
11 January	UK	Helen Wyman	Kona FFSA Factory Team
11 January	France	Pauline Ferrand-Prévot	Rabobank-Liv Woman Cycling Team
11 January	Italy	Eva Lechner	
11 January	Netherlands	Marianne Vos	Rabobank-Liv Woman Cycling Team
11 January	Germany	Jessica Lambracht	
11 January	Switzerland	Sina Frei	
11 January	Austria	Nadja Heigl	
11 January	Denmark	Annika Langvad	
11 January	Ireland	Francine Meehan	
11 January	Luxembourg	Christine Majerus	Team SD Worx–Protime
11 January	Belgium	Sanne Cant	
11 January	Portugal	Isabel Marisa Morgado	
11 January	Poland	Olga Wasiuk	
12 January	USA	Katie Compton	Lidl–Trek

== See also ==
- For men's Cyclo-cross see: 2014–15 cyclo-cross season
