= Lizzie Williams =

Australian cyclist

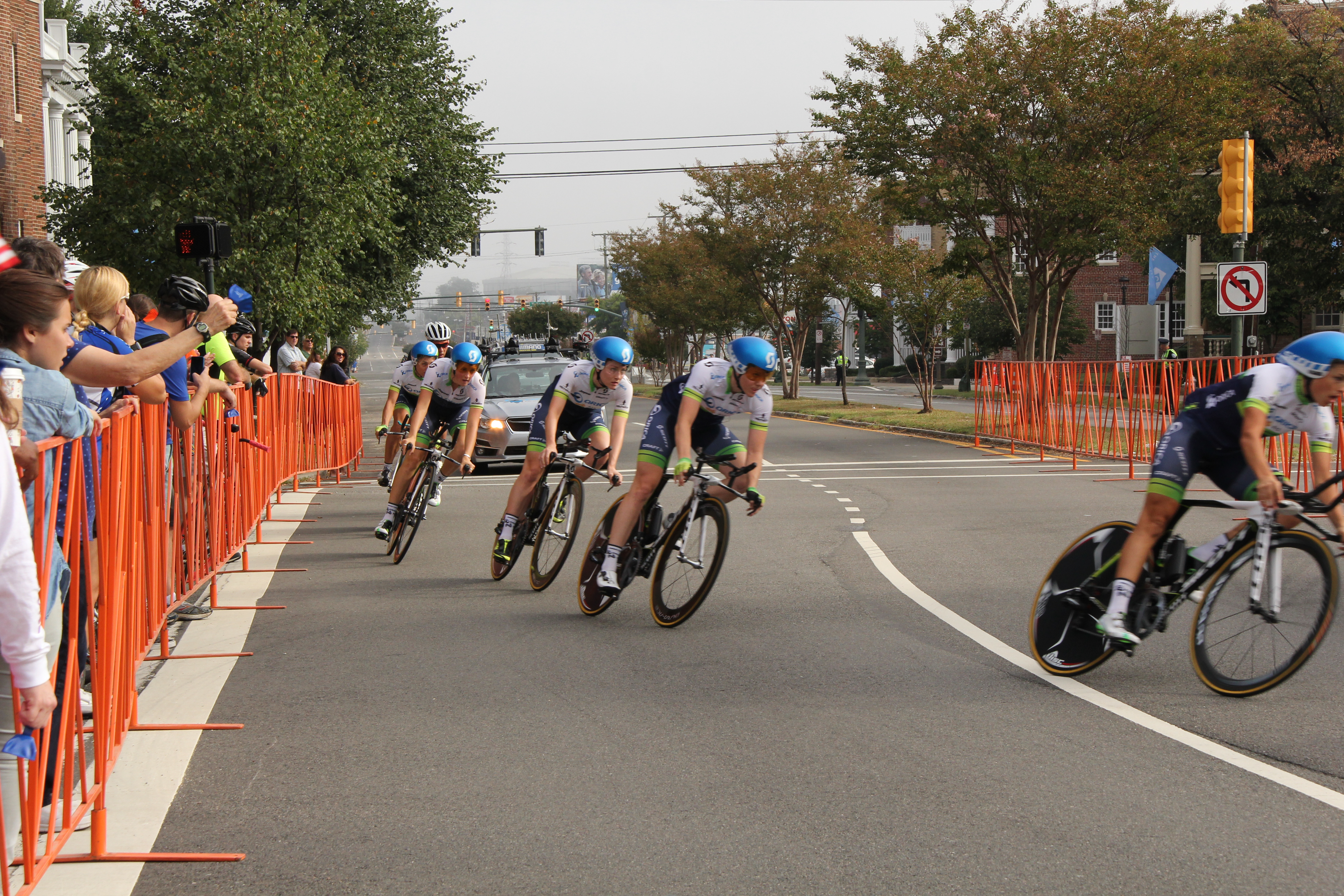
- Riding with Orica–AIS at the 2015 UCI Road World Championships

Personal information
- Full name: Elizabeth Williams
- Born: 15 August 1983 (age 43) Victoria, Australia
- Height: 171 cm (5 ft 7 in)

Cycling career
- Sport: Cycling
- Current team: Retired
- Disciplines: Road; Track
- Role: Rider
- Rider type: All-rounder

Amateur team
- 2014: Vanderkitten

Professional teams
- 2014: Specialized Securitor
- 2015–2016: Orica–AIS
- 2017: Hagens Berman–Supermint
- 2018: Tibco–Silicon Valley Bank

Lizzie Williams (born 15 August 1983) is an Australian former racing cyclist, who rode professionally between 2014 and 2018 for the Specialized Securitor, Orica–AIS, Hagens Berman–Supermint andTibco–Silicon Valley Bank teams.

== Career ==
Williams originally quit the sport in 2004 and returned ten years later at the end of 2013, spending the time before her comeback as a teacher whilst playing Australian rules football. In a gap in the 2014 NRS calendar, Williams was a guest rider in the US with Jono Coulter-managed team Vanderkitten for a couple of months. Coulter suggested she apply for the Amy Gillett Cycling Scholarship, she was awarded the 2014 scholarship to race with the Australian National team in Europe the next month. She rode at the 2014 UCI Road World Championships.

Williams would be offered a contract with Australian UCI Women's Team Orica–AIS for 2015, achieving her first UCI win that year. With the pressure of an Olympic year in 2016, an injury plagued spring classics season proved to be the breaking point for Williams and she left the Australian base in Europe unannounced. Williams reconnected with Jono Coulter to ride for his co-managed US-based UCI team Hagens Berman–Supermint in 2017. Williams had signed with Tibco–Silicon Valley Bank for 2018 taking more of a leadership role in the higher UCI-ranked team. In between the 2017 and 2018 road seasons, Williams would not return to racing with Tibco, citing the isolation from family of athlete life overseas, choosing to retire to preserve her mental health.

== Major results ==
2003
1st Criterium, National Road Championships
2014
4th Overall Trophée d'Or Féminin
6th Philadelphia Cycling Classic
7th Overall La Route de France
8th Road race, Oceania Road Championships
2015
1st SwissEver GP Cham-Hagendorn
2nd Road race, Oceania Road Championships
3rd Overall Bay Classic Series
5th Cadel Evans Great Ocean Road Race
5th Giro del Trentino Alto Adige-Südtirol
8th Overall Festival Luxembourgeois du cyclisme féminin Elsy Jacobs
9th Overall Women's Tour Down Under
9th Overall Ladies Tour of Norway
9th Sparkassen Giro
2016
2nd Criterium, National Road Championships
6th Overall Women's Tour Down Under

1st Stage 3

2017
4th Winston-Salem Cycling Classic
