= Michela Pavin =

Italian cyclist (born 1994)

Personal information
- Born: 15 July 1994 (age 32) Schio, Italy

Cycling career
- Sport: Cycling
- Current team: Retired
- Discipline: Road
- Role: Rider

Professional teams
- 2013–2014: MCipollini–Giordana
- 2015: Servetto Footon
- 2016: Inpa–Bianchi
- 2017: Top Girls Fassa Bortolo

Michela Pavin (born 15 July 1994) is an Italian former professional racing cyclist. In 2015, Pavin finished fifth overall at the Tour of Zhoushan Island, and in 2017, she finished sixth at the Gran Premio della Liberazione and tenth at the Grand Prix de Dottignies.

== See also ==
- 2014 Alé Cipollini season
