= 2013 Giro della Toscana Int. Femminile – Memorial Michela Fanini =

Race details
- Dates: 11–15 September 2013
- Stages: 4 + Prologue
- Distance: 461.2 km (286.6 mi)

The 2013 Giro della Toscana Int. Femminile – Memorial Michela Fanini will be the 19th edition of the Giro della Toscana Int. Femminile – Memorial Michela Fanini, a women's cycling stage race in Italy. It was rated by the UCI as a category 2.HC race and will be held between 11 and 15 September 2013.

== Participating teams ==
=== UCI Women's Teams ===
MCipollini–Giordana
S.C. Michela Fanini-Rox
Rabobank-Liv Giant
Vaiano Fondriest
Top Girls Fassa Bortolo
Be Pink
Team Argos–Shimano
Boels–Dolmans Cycling Team
Optum p/b Kelly Benefit Strategies
Team TIBCO
Hitec Products UCK
Orica–AIS
Chirio–Forno d'Asolo
Sengers Ladies Cycling Team
Pasta Zara–Cogeas
Wiggle–Honda
Specialized–lululemon
Faren–Let's Go Finland
Servetto Footon

=== National Teams ===
Germany
US National Team
Slovenia
France
Italy

== Safety concerns ==
During the 4th and final stage 63 riders abandoned the race or did not take the start, in protest of the lack of security measures during the stage race.

== Stages ==
=== Prologue ===
11 September 2013 – Campi Bisenzio to Campi Bisenzio, 2.2 km (1.4 mi)

Prologue result

	Rider	Team	Time
1	Marianne Vos (NED)	Rabobank-Liv Giant	2' 53"
2	Annemiek van Vleuten (NED)	Rabobank-Liv Giant	+ 3"
3	Shelley Olds (USA)	Team TIBCO	+ 5"
4	Kirsten Wild (NED)	Team Argos–Shimano	+ 5"
5	Tiffany Cromwell (AUS)	Orica–AIS	+ 6"

General classification after Prologue

	Rider	Team	Time
1	Marianne Vos (NED)	Rabobank-Liv Giant	2' 53"
2	Annemiek van Vleuten (NED)	Rabobank-Liv Giant	+ 3"
3	Shelley Olds (USA)	Team TIBCO	+ 5"
4	Kirsten Wild (NED)	Team Argos–Shimano	+ 5"
5	Tiffany Cromwell (AUS)	Orica–AIS	+ 6"

=== Stage 1 ===
12 September 2013 – Bottegone to Massa e Cozzile, 126.15 km (78.4 mi)

Stage 1 result

	Rider	Team	Time
1	Giorgia Bronzini (ITA)	Wiggle–Honda	3h 21' 12"
2	Rossella Ratto (ITA)	Hitec Products UCK	s.t.
3	Marianne Vos (NED)	Rabobank-Liv Giant	s.t.
4	Emma Johansson (SWE)	Orica–AIS	s.t.
5	Tiffany Cromwell (AUS)	Orica–AIS	s.t.

General classification after Stage 1

	Rider	Team	Time
1	Marianne Vos (NED)	Rabobank-Liv Giant	3h 24' 01"
2	Giorgia Bronzini (ITA)	Wiggle–Honda	+ 5"
3	Tiffany Cromwell (AUS)	Orica–AIS	+ 10"
4	Rossella Ratto (NED)	Hitec Products UCK	+ 10"
5	Emma Johansson (SWE)	Orica–AIS	+ 12"

=== Stage 2 ===
13 September 2013 – Porcari to Pontederao, 110.05 km (68.4 mi)

Stage 2 result

	Rider	Team	Time
1	Marianne Vos (NED)	Rabobank-Liv Giant	2h 46' 22"
2	Shelley Olds (USA)	Team TIBCO	s.t.
3	Barbara Guarischi (ITA)	Vaiano – Fondriest	s.t.
4	Valentina Scandolara (ITA)	Orica–AIS	s.t.
5	Annalisa Cucinotta (ITA)	Servetto Footon	s.t.

General classification after Stage 2

	Rider	Team	Time
1	Marianne Vos (NED)	Rabobank-Liv Giant	6h 10' 10"
2	Giorgia Bronzini (ITA)	Wiggle–Honda	+ 18"
3	Tiffany Cromwell (AUS)	Orica–AIS	+ 21"
4	Rossella Ratto (NED)	Hitec Products UCK	+ 23"
5	Emma Johansson (SWE)	Orica–AIS	+ 25"

=== Stage 3 ===
14 September 2013 – Segromigno to Capannori, 124 km (77.1 mi)

Stage 3 result

	Rider	Team	Time
1	Marianne Vos (NED)	Rabobank-Liv Giant	3h 18' 45"
2	Emma Johansson (SWE)	Orica–AIS	s.t.
3	Anna van der Breggen (NED)	Sengers Ladies Cycling Team	s.t.
4	Rossella Ratto (ITA)	Hitec Products UCK	s.t.
5	Claudia Häusler (GER)	Team TIBCO	s.t.

General classification after Stage 3

	Rider	Team	Time
1	Marianne Vos (NED)	Rabobank-Liv Giant	9h 28' 42"
2	Emma Johansson (SWE)	Orica–AIS	+ 32"
3	Anna van der Breggen (NED)	Sengers Ladies Cycling Team	+ 34"
4	Rossella Ratto (NED)	Hitec Products UCK	+ 35"
5	Claudia Häusler (GER)	Team TIBCO	+ 44"

=== Stage 4 ===
15 September 2013 – Lucca to Florence, 98.8 km (61.4 mi)

Stage 4 result

	Rider	Team	Time
1	Aude Biannic (FRA)	S.C. Michela Fanini Rox	2h 28' 28"
2	Lisi Rist (EST)	S.C. Michela Fanini Rox	s.t.
3	Jutatip Maneephan (THA)	S.C. Michela Fanini Rox	s.t.
4	Yevheniya Vysotska (UKR)	S.C. Michela Fanini Rox	s.t.
5	Edwige Pitel (FRA)	S.C. Michela Fanini Rox	s.t.

Final general classification after Stage 4

	Rider	Team	Time
1	Claudia Häusler (GER)	Team TIBCO	11h 57' 54"
2	Tatiana Antoshina (RUS)	MCipollini–Giordana	+ 1"
3	Francesca Cauz (ITA)	Top Girls Fassa Bortolo	+ 5' 47"
4	Valentina Scandolara (ITA)	MCipollini–Giordana	+ 5' 59"
5	Shelley Olds (USA)	Team TIBCO	+ 9' 45"

== Classification leadership ==
Stage	Winner	General classification	Points classification	Mountains classification	Teams classification
P	Marianne Vos	Marianne Vos	Marianne Vos	Not awarded	Rabobank-Liv Giant
1	Giorgia Bronzini	Marianne Vos	Marianne Vos	Noemi Cantele	
2	Marianne Vos	Marianne Vos	Marianne Vos	Noemi Cantele	
3	Marianne Vos	Marianne Vos	Marianne Vos	Noemi Cantele	
4	Aude Biannic	Claudia Häusler	Shelley Olds	Francesca Cauz	
Final		Claudia Häusler	Shelley Olds	Francesca Cauz	
