= Asja Paladin =

Italian cyclist (born 1994)

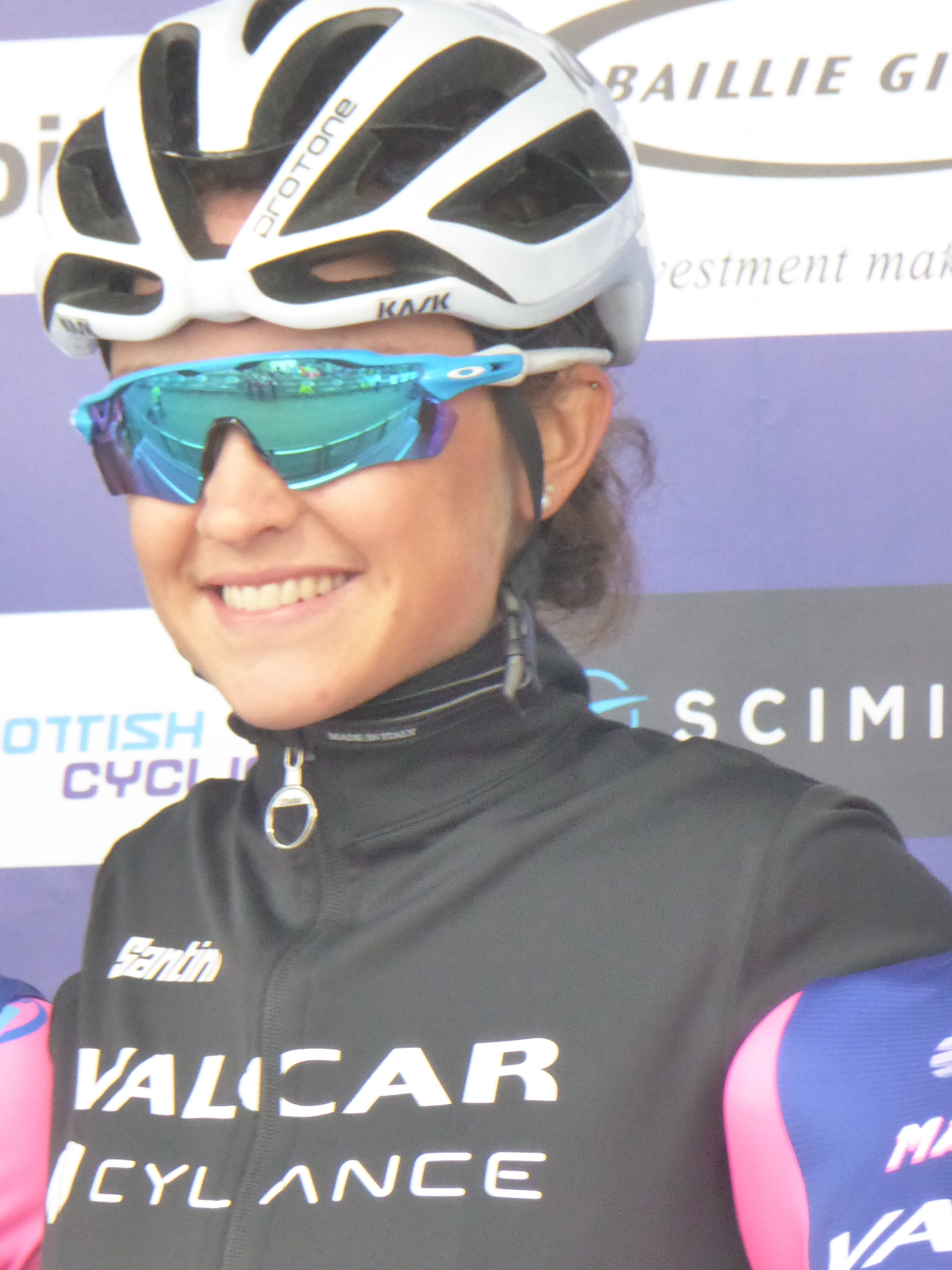
- Paladin at the 2019 Women's Tour of Scotland

Personal information
- Full name: Asja Paladin
- Born: 27 September 1994 (age 32)

Cycling career
- Sport: Cycling
- Current team: Retired
- Discipline: Road
- Role: Rider

Amateur team
- 2020: Casa Dorada Women Cycling

Professional teams
- 2013–2017: Top Girls Fassa Bortolo
- 2018–2019: Valcar–PBM
- 2020: Cronos–Casa Dorada

Asja Paladin (born 27 September 1994) is an Italian former professional racing cyclist, who rode professionally between 2013 and 2020 for the Top Girls Fassa Bortolo, Valcar–Cylance and Cronos–Casa Dorada teams.

== Personal life ==
Her sister Soraya Paladin is also a professional cyclist.

== Major results ==
2013
7th Overall Giro della Toscana Int. Femminile – Memorial Michela Fanini
2016
8th Overall Giro del Trentino Alto Adige-Südtirol
10th Overall Tour Cycliste Féminin International de l'Ardèche
2018
1st Mountains classification, Emakumeen Euskal Bira

== See also ==
- Top Girls Fassa Bortolo
