= 2014 GP Comune di Cornaredo =

Race details
- Dates: 23 March 2014
- Stages: 1
- Distance: 121 km (75 mi)
- Winning time: 3h 07' 20"

Results
	Winner	Shelley Olds (USA)	(Alé Cipollini)
	Second	Tiffany Cromwell (AUS)	(Specialized–lululemon)
	Third	Giorgia Bronzini (ITA)	(Wiggle–Honda)

The 2014 GP Comune di Cornaredo was the 4th edition of a one-day women's cycle race held in Italy on 23 March 2014. The race has an UCI rating of 1.2.

== Results ==
	Rider	Team	Time
1	Shelley Olds (USA)	Alé Cipollini	3h 07' 20"
2	Tiffany Cromwell (AUS)	Specialized–lululemon	s.t.
3	Giorgia Bronzini (ITA)	Wiggle–Honda	s.t.
4	Anna Stricker (ITA)	Astana BePink	s.t.
5	Trixi Worrack (GER)	Specialized–lululemon	s.t.
6	Peta Mullens (AUS)	Wiggle–Honda	s.t.
7	Martina Zwick (GER)	Bigla Cycling Team	s.t.
8	Lotta Lepistö (FIN)	Bigla Cycling Team	s.t.
9	Carmen Small (USA)	Specialized–lululemon	s.t.
10	Małgorzata Jasińska (POL)	Alé Cipollini	s.t.
