= 2012–13 cyclo-cross season =

The 2012–2013 cyclo-cross season consists of three international series conducted in the bicycle racing discipline of cyclo-cross:

- World Cup
- Superprestige
- BPost Bank Trophy

The season began on 7 October with the Cyclo-cross Ruddervoorde, won by Sven Nys. It is scheduled to end on 24 February 2013. The season will also include the 2013 UCI Cyclo-cross World Championships on 2 February in Louisville, Kentucky, the first edition of that event to be held outside of Europe.

== Race calendar ==
UCI World Championship
UCI World Cup
Superprestige
BPost Bank Trophy

Date	Venue	Winner	Second	Third
7 October	(Belgium) Ruddervoorde	Sven Nys (BEL)	Niels Albert (BEL)	Kevin Pauwels (BEL)
14 October	(Belgium) Ronse	Niels Albert (BEL)	Kevin Pauwels (BEL)	Sven Nys (BEL)
21 October	(Czech Republic) Tábor	Kevin Pauwels (BEL)	Lars van der Haar (NED)	Niels Albert (BEL)
28 October	(Czech Republic) Plzeň	Niels Albert (BEL)	Klaas Vantornout (BEL)	Kevin Pauwels (BEL)
1 November	(Belgium) Koppenberg	Sven Nys (BEL)	Niels Albert (BEL)	Klaas Vantornout (BEL)
4 November	(Belgium) Zonhoven	Sven Nys (BEL)	Niels Albert (BEL)	Bart Aernouts (BEL)
11 November	(Belgium) Hamme-Zogge	Sven Nys (BEL)	Niels Albert (BEL)	Lars van der Haar (NED)
17 November	(Belgium) Hasselt	Sven Nys (BEL)	Niels Albert (BEL)	Kevin Pauwels (BEL)
18 November	(Belgium) Asper-Gavere	Sven Nys (BEL)	Klaas Vantornout (BEL)	Bart Wellens (BEL)
24 November	(Belgium) Koksijde	Sven Nys (BEL)	Niels Albert (BEL)	Francis Mourey (FRA)
25 November	(Netherlands) Gieten	Klaas Vantornout (BEL)	Sven Nys (BEL)	Kevin Pauwels (BEL)
2 December	(France) Roubaix	Sven Nys (BEL)	Kevin Pauwels (BEL)	Niels Albert (BEL)
22 December	(Belgium) Essen	Jan Denuwelaere (BEL)	Rob Peeters (BEL)	Niels Albert (BEL)
23 December	(Belgium) Namur	Kevin Pauwels (BEL)	Sven Nys (BEL)	Niels Albert (BEL)
26 December	(Belgium) Heusden-Zolder	Sven Nys (BEL)	Niels Albert (BEL)	Zdeněk Štybar (CZE)
28 December	(Belgium) Loenhout	Niels Albert (BEL)	Zdeněk Štybar (CZE)	Kevin Pauwels (BEL)
30 December	(Belgium) Diegem	Niels Albert (BEL)	Kevin Pauwels (BEL)	Zdeněk Štybar (CZE)
1 January	(Belgium) Baal	Kevin Pauwels (BEL)	Zdeněk Štybar (CZE)	Niels Albert (BEL)
6 January	(Italy) Rome	Kevin Pauwels (BEL)	Niels Albert (BEL)	Marco Aurelio Fontana (ITA)
20 January	(Netherlands) Hoogerheide	Martin Bína (CZE)	Lars van der Haar (NED)	Simon Zahner (SUI)
2 February	(United States) Louisville	Sven Nys (BEL)	Klaas Vantornout (BEL)	Lars van der Haar (NED)
9 February	(Belgium) Lille	Niels Albert (BEL)	Klaas Vantornout (BEL)	Sven Nys (BEL)
10 February	(Belgium) Hoogstraten	Sven Nys (BEL)	Klaas Vantornout (BEL)	Kevin Pauwels (BEL)
16 February	(Belgium) Middelkerke	Klaas Vantornout (BEL)	Niels Albert (BEL)	Tom Meeusen (BEL)
24 February	(Belgium) Oostmalle	Niels Albert (BEL)	Klaas Vantornout (BEL)	Jim Aernouts (BEL)

=== National Championships ===
Nation	Men's winner	Women's winner
Austria	Daniel Geismayr	Nadja Heigl
Belgium	Klaas Vantornout	Sanne Cant
Canada	Geoff Kabush	Mical Dyck
Croatia	Filip Turk	Antonela Ferenčić
Czech Republic	Zdeněk Štybar	Pavla Havlíková
Denmark	Kenneth Hansen	Margriet Kloppenburg
Finland	Samuel Pökälä	Maija Rossi
France	Francis Mourey	Lucie Chainel-Lefèvre
Germany	Philipp Walsleben	Trixi Worrack
Great Britain	Ian Field	Nikki Harris
Hungary		
Ireland	Roger Aiken	
Italy	Marco Aurelio Fontana	Eva Lechner
Japan	Yu Takenouchi	Sakiko Miyauchi
Luxembourg	Christian Helmig	Christine Majerus
Netherlands	Lars van der Haar	Marianne Vos
Poland	Marek Konwa	Magdalena Pyrgies
Portugal	Vítor Santos	Isabel Caetano
Romania		
Serbia		
Slovakia	Martin Haring	Tereza Medveďová
Spain	Aitor Hernández	Lucía González
Sweden	Magnus Darvell	Asa Maria Erlandsson
Switzerland	Julien Taramarcaz	Jasmin Achermann
United States	Jonathan Page	Katie Compton

== See also ==
- 2013 UCI Cyclo-cross World Championships
- 2011–2012 cyclo-cross season
- Glossary of cycling
- History of cycling
- Outline of cycling
