= 2014 Giro della Toscana Int. Femminile – Memorial Michela Fanini =

Race details
- Dates: 12–14 September 2014
- Stages: 2 + Prologue
- Distance: 232.1 km (144.2 mi)

The 2014 Giro della Toscana Int. Femminile – Memorial Michela Fanini will be the 20th edition of the Giro della Toscana Int. Femminile – Memorial Michela Fanini, a women's cycling stage race in Italy. It was rated by the UCI as a category 2.2 race (having dropped down from 2.HC the year previously) and will be held between 12 and 14 September 2013.

== Stages ==
=== Prologue ===
12 September 2014 – Campi Bisenzio to Campi Bisenzio, 2.22 km (1.4 mi)

=== Stage 1 ===
13 September 2014 – Segromigno in Piano to Segromigno in Piano, 133.6 km (83.0 mi)

=== Stage 2 ===
13 September 2013 – Lucca to Capannori, 96.3 km (59.8 mi)

== Classification leadership ==
| Stage | Winner | General classification | Points classification | Mountains classification |
|---|---|---|---|---|
| P | Shelley Olds | Shelley Olds | Shelley Olds | Not Awarded |
| 1 | Shelley Olds | Shelley Olds | Shelley Olds | Katarzyna Niewiadoma |
| 2 | Małgorzata Jasińska | Shelley Olds | Shelley Olds | Małgorzata Jasińska |
| Final | | Shelley Olds | Shelley Olds | Małgorzata Jasińska |
