= Małgorzata Jasińska =

Polish cyclist (born 1984)

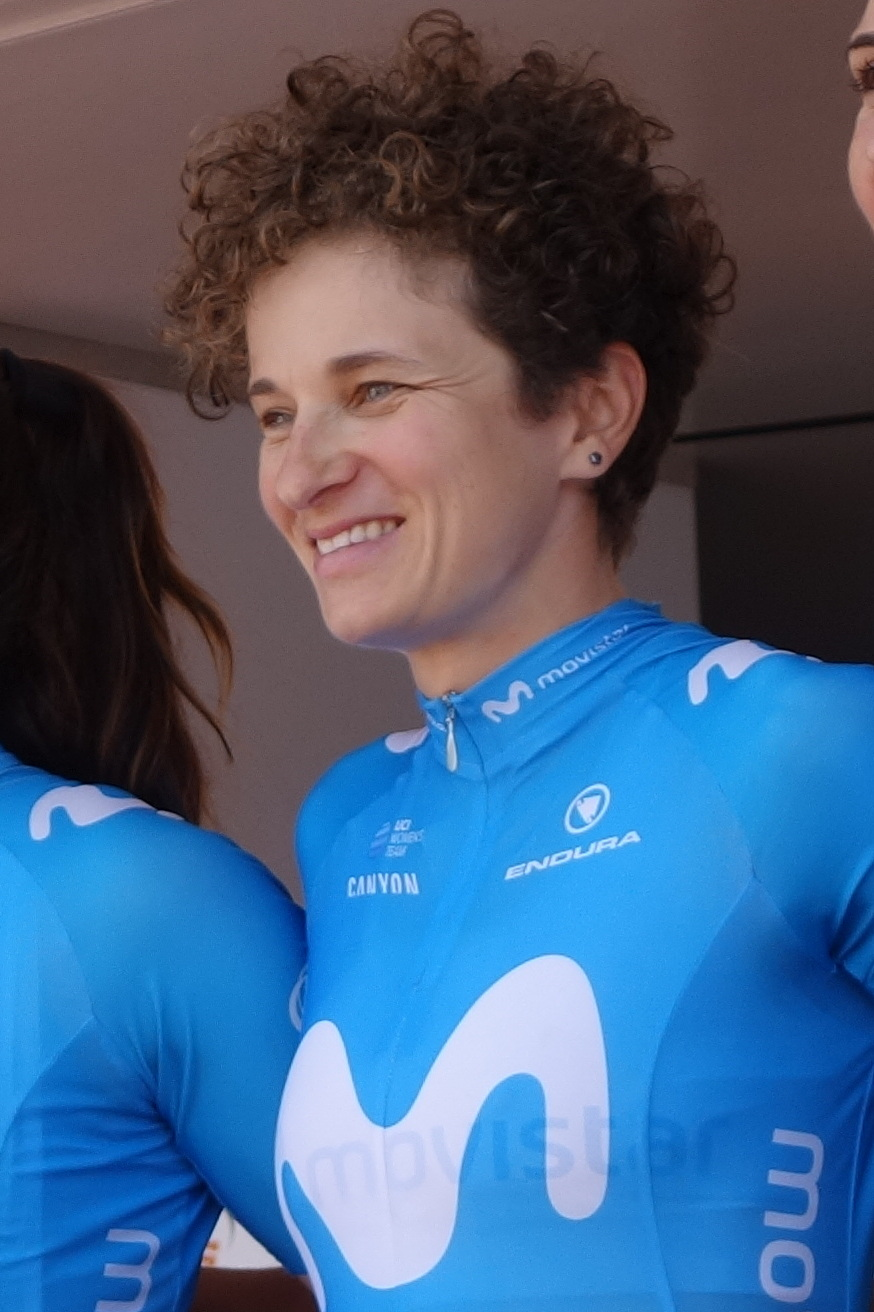
- Jasińska at the 2019 Holland Ladies Tour

Personal information
- Full name: Małgorzata Jasińska
- Born: 18 January 1984 (age 42) Olsztyn, Poland

Cycling career
- Sport: Cycling
- Discipline: Road
- Role: Rider

Amateur team
- 2020: Casa Dorada Women Cycling

Professional teams
- 2007–2008: Pol–Aqua
- 2011: S.C. Michela Fanini Rox
- 2012–2016: Alé–Cipollini
- 2017: Cylance Pro Cycling
- 2018–2019: Movistar Team
- 2020–2021: Cronos–Casa Dorada

Major wins
- Stage races Giro della Toscana Int. Femminile – Memorial Michela Fanini (2012, 2015) One day races & Classics National Road Race Championships (2009, 2010, 2015, 2018) National Time Trial Championships (2018)

Małgorzata Jasińska (born 18 January 1984) is a Polish racing cyclist, who most recently rode for UCI Women's Continental Team Burgos Alimenta Women Cycling Sport.

In 2023, she became team manager of UCI Women's Continental Team Lifeplus–Wahoo alongside Morgan Kneisky.

== Major results ==
2005
2nd Road race, National Road Championships
7th Overall Eko Tour Dookola Polski
2006
9th Road race, UEC European Under-23 Road Championships
2007
1st Copa Club Ciclista Callosino
2nd Trofeo Ciudad de Sevilla
4th Road race, National Road Championships
4th Klomnice Road Race
5th Overall Tour de Pologne Feminin
2008
1st Dzierzoniów
National Road Championships

2nd Road race
5th Time trial

3rd Sobótka
4th Majowy Wyscig Klasyczny – Lublin
5th Górskie Mistrzostwa Polski
6th Klasyczny-Naleczow
6th Grudziadz
7th Overall Wyscig Etapowy – Zamosc
2009
1st Road race, National Road Championships
2010
1st Road race, National Road Championships
2nd Giornata del Ciclismo Rosa a Nove
5th Eroica Rosa
8th Overall Giro del Trentino Alto Adige-Südtirol
8th Muri Fermani "Le Nostre Fiandre"
2011
5th Road race, National Road Championships
2012
1st Overall Giro della Toscana Int. Femminile – Memorial Michela Fanini

1st Mountains classification
1st Stage 2

3rd Road race, National Road Championships
6th Overall Trophée d'Or Féminin
8th Overall Giro del Trentino Alto Adige-Südtirol
8th GP Comune di Cornaredo
2013
5th Team time trial, UCI Road World Championships
7th Road race, National Road Championships
2014
2nd Overall Giro della Toscana Int. Femminile — Memorial Michela Fanini

1st Mountains classification
1st Stage 2

National Road Championships

7th Time trial
9th Road race

9th Overall Holland Ladies Tour
9th Overall La Route de France
10th Overall Trophée d'Or Féminin
10th GP Comune di Cornaredo
2015
National Road Championships

1st Road race
4th Time trial

1st Overall Giro della Toscana Int. Femminile – Memorial Michela Fanini

1st Mountains classification
1st Stage 2

1st Mountains classification Tour Cycliste Féminin International de l'Ardèche
5th Giro dell'Emilia Internazionale Donne Elite
7th SwissEver GP Cham-Hagendorn
2016
1st Gran Prix San Luis Femenino
2nd Overall Tour Femenino de San Luis
National Road Championships

3rd Road race
3rd Time trial

4th Durango-Durango Emakumeen Saria
5th Overall Giro della Toscana Int. Femminile – Memorial Michela Fanini
9th Overall Emakumeen Euskal Bira
2017
5th Time trial, National Road Championships
8th Le Samyn des Dames
2018
National Road Championships

1st Road race
1st Time trial

2nd Grand Prix de Plumelec-Morbihan Dames
2nd Veenendaal–Veenendaal Classic
5th Road race, UCI Road World Championships
6th Tour of Flanders for Women
7th Dwars door Vlaanderen
7th GP de Plouay – Bretagne
8th Overall Thüringen Rundfahrt der Frauen
8th Overall Belgium Tour
10th Overall Emakumeen Euskal Bira
2019
2nd Time trial, National Road Championships
7th Le Samyn des Dames
9th Overall The Women's Tour
