= Fleur Faure =

French cyclist

Personal information
- Born: 13 August 1993 (age 33) Aix-en-Provence, France

Cycling career
- Sport: Cycling
- Role: Rider

Fleur Faure (born 13 August 1993) is a French professional racing cyclist.

== Major results ==
2014
Fenioux - 80 ans du Vélodrome de Lyon

2nd Scratch Race
2nd Sprint

== See also ==
- List of 2015 UCI Women's Teams and riders
