= 2014 La Route de France =

Race details
- Dates: 10–16 August 2014
- Stages: 7
- Distance: 787 km (489 mi)
- Winning time: 21h 41' 22"

Results
Jersey awarded to the overall winner	Winner	Claudia Lichtenberg (GER)	(Giant-Shimano)
	Second	Alena Amialiusik (BLR)	(Astana BePink)
	Third	Aude Biannic (FRA)	(Lointek)
Jersey awarded to the youth classification winner	Youth	Sabrina Stultiens (NED)	(Netherlands national team)
Jersey awarded to the team classification winner	Team	Giant–Shimano	

The 2014 La Route de France was an Elite Women's road race, rated at 2.1 by the UCI. Claudia Lichtenberg of Giant–Shimano won the first stage by 29 seconds and held on to the leader's jersey for the entire race.

== Teams ==
The following teams are participating:

UCI Women's Teams

- Alé–Cipollini
- Astana BePink
- Lointek
- Lotto–Belisol Ladies
- Poitou–Charentes.Futuroscope.86
- RusVelo
- Team Giant–Shimano
- Vaiano Fondriest
- Wiggle–Honda

National teams

- Australia
- France
- Lithuania
- Netherlands
- Slovakia

== Stages ==
The 2014 edition of the race has seven road race stages, with no prologue or time trial stages.

=== Stage 1 ===
10 August 2014 – Mouilleron-en-Pareds to Mouilleron-en-Pareds, 106.4 km (66.1 mi)

Stage 1 result

	Rider	Team	Time
1	Claudia Lichtenberg (GER)	Giant–Shimano	3h 02' 21"
2	Alena Amialiusik (BLR)	Astana BePink	+ 29"
3	Giorgia Bronzini (ITA)	Wiggle–Honda	+ 1' 44"
4	Lizzie Williams (AUS)	Australia (national team)	+ 1' 44"
5	Audrey Cordon (FRA)	France (national team)	+ 1' 44"
6	Maaike Polspoel (BEL)	Giant–Shimano	+ 1' 44"
7	Sabrina Stultiens (NED)	Netherlands (national team)	+ 1' 44"
8	Małgorzata Jasińska (POL)	Alé–Cipollini	+ 1' 44"
9	Aude Biannic (FRA)	Lointek	+ 1' 44"
10	Elena Berlato (ITA)	Alé–Cipollini	+ 1' 44"

General classification after stage 1

	Rider	Team	Time
1	Claudia Lichtenberg (GER)	Giant–Shimano	3h 02' 21"
2	Alena Amialiusik (BLR)	Astana BePink	+ 29"
3	Giorgia Bronzini (ITA)	Wiggle–Honda	+ 1' 44"
4	Lizzie Williams (AUS)	Australia (national team)	+ 1' 44"
5	Audrey Cordon (FRA)	France (national team)	+ 1' 44"
6	Maaike Polspoel (BEL)	Giant–Shimano	+ 1' 44"
7	Sabrina Stultiens (NED)	Netherlands (national team)	+ 1' 44"
8	Małgorzata Jasińska (POL)	Alé–Cipollini	+ 1' 44"
9	Aude Biannic (FRA)	Lointek	+ 1' 44"
10	Elena Berlato (ITA)	Alé–Cipollini	+ 1' 44"

=== Stage 2 ===
11 August 2014 – Mouilleron-en-Pareds to Ligné, 123.9 km (77.0 mi)

Stage 2 result

	Rider	Team	Time
1	Barbara Guarischi (ITA)	Alé–Cipollini	3h 18' 21"
2	Kirsten Wild (NED)	Giant–Shimano	s.t.
3	Jolien D'Hoore (BEL)	Lotto–Belisol Ladies	s.t.
4	Shelley Olds (USA)	Alé–Cipollini	s.t.
5	Giorgia Bronzini (ITA)	Wiggle–Honda	s.t.
6	Audrey Cordon (FRA)	France (national team)	s.t.
7	Pascale Jeulend (FRA)	Poitou–Charentes.Futuroscope.86	s.t.
8	Fiona Dutriaux (FRA)	Poitou–Charentes.Futuroscope.86	s.t.
9	Aude Biannic (FRA)	Lointek	s.t.
10	Elena Berlato (ITA)	Poitou–Charentes.Futuroscope.86	s.t.

General classification after stage 2

	Rider	Team	Time
1	Claudia Lichtenberg (GER)	Giant–Shimano	6h 20' 42"
2	Alena Amialiusik (BLR)	Astana BePink	+ 29"
3	Giorgia Bronzini (ITA)	Wiggle–Honda	+ 1' 44"
4	Audrey Cordon (FRA)	France (national team)	+ 1' 44"
5	Aude Biannic (FRA)	Lointek	+ 1' 44"
6	Sabrina Stultiens (NED)	Netherlands (national team)	+ 1' 44"
7	Maaike Polspoel (BEL)	Giant–Shimano	+ 1' 44"
8	Amelie Rivat (FRA)	Poitou–Charentes.Futuroscope.86	+ 1' 44"
9	Małgorzata Jasińska (POL)	Alé–Cipollini	+ 1' 44"
10	Lizzie Williams (AUS)	Australia (national team)	+ 1' 44"

=== Stage 3 ===
12 August 2014 – Château-du-Loir to Vendôme, 96 km (59.7 mi)

Stage 3 result

	Rider	Team	Time
1	Giorgia Bronzini (ITA)	Wiggle–Honda	3h 03' 23"
2	Jolien D'Hoore (BEL)	Lotto–Belisol Ladies	s.t.
3	Shelley Olds (USA)	Alé–Cipollini	s.t.
4	Kirsten Wild (NED)	Giant–Shimano	s.t.
5	Barbara Guarischi (ITA)	Alé–Cipollini	s.t.
6	Simona Frapporti (ITA)	Astana BePink	s.t.
7	Lizzie Williams (AUS)	Australia (national team)	s.t.
8	Fanny Riberot (FRA)	Lointek	s.t.
9	Roxane Fournier (FRA)	Poitou–Charentes.Futuroscope.86	s.t.
10	Edita Janeliūnaitė (LTU)	Forno d'Asolo–Astute	s.t.

General classification after stage 3

	Rider	Team	Time
1	Claudia Lichtenberg (GER)	Giant–Shimano	9h 24' 05"
2	Alena Amialiusik (BLR)	Astana BePink	+ 29"
3	Giorgia Bronzini (ITA)	Wiggle–Honda	+ 1' 44"
4	Audrey Cordon (FRA)	France (national team)	+ 1' 44"
5	Maaike Polspoel (BEL)	Giant–Shimano	+ 1' 44"
6	Lizzie Williams (AUS)	Australia (national team)	+ 1' 44"
7	Sabrina Stultiens (NED)	Netherlands (national team)	+ 1' 44"
8	Małgorzata Jasińska (POL)	Alé–Cipollini	+ 1' 44"
9	Aude Biannic (FRA)	Lointek	+ 1' 50"
10	Elena Berlato (ITA)	Alé–Cipollini	+ 1' 50"

=== Stage 4 ===
13 August 2014 – Cloyes-sur-le-Loir to Chalette-sur-Loing, 137.1 km (85.2 mi)

Stage 4 result

	Rider	Team	Time
1	Kirsten Wild (NED)	Giant–Shimano	3h 19' 02"
2	Giorgia Bronzini (ITA)	Wiggle–Honda	s.t.
3	Barbara Guarischi (ITA)	Alé–Cipollini	s.t.
4	Shelley Olds (USA)	Alé–Cipollini	s.t.
5	Simona Frapporti (ITA)	Astana BePink	s.t.
6	Jolien D'Hoore (BEL)	Lotto–Intermarché Ladies	s.t.
7	Pascale Jeuland (FRA)	Poitou–Charentes.Futuroscope.86	s.t.
8	Lizzie Williams (AUS)	Australia (national team)	s.t.
9	Aude Biannic (FRA)	Lointek	s.t.
10	Roxane Fournier (FRA)	Poitou–Charentes.Futuroscope.86	s.t.

General classification after stage 4

	Rider	Team	Time
1	Claudia Lichtenberg (GER)	Giant–Shimano	12h 43' 07"
2	Alena Amialiusik (BLR)	Astana BePink	+ 29"
3	Giorgia Bronzini (ITA)	Wiggle–Honda	+ 1' 44"
4	Audrey Cordon (FRA)	France (national team)	+ 1' 44"
5	Aude Biannic (FRA)	Lointek	+ 1' 44"
6	Lizzie Williams (AUS)	Australia (national team)	+ 1' 44"
7	Sabrina Stultiens (NED)	Netherlands (national team)	+ 1' 44"
8	Maaike Polspoel (BEL)	Giant–Shimano	+ 1' 44"
9	Małgorzata Jasińska (POL)	Alé–Cipollini	+ 1' 44"
10	Amelie Rivat (FRA)	Poitou–Charentes.Futuroscope.86	+ 1' 44"

=== Stage 5 ===
14 August 2014 – Paucourt to Migennes, 97.3 km (60.5 mi)

Stage 5 result

	Rider	Team	Time
1	Audrey Cordon (FRA)	France (national team)	2h 23' 19"
2	Barbara Guarischi (ITA)	Alé–Cipollini	s.t.
3	Claudia Lichtenberg (GER)	Giant–Shimano	s.t.
4	Jolien D'Hoore (BEL)	Lotto–Intermarché Ladies	s.t.
5	Charlotte Becker (GER)	Wiggle–Honda	s.t.
6	Pascale Jeuland (FRA)	Poitou–Charentes.Futuroscope.86	s.t.
7	Aizhan Zhaparova (RUS)	RusVelo	s.t.
8	Linda Villumsen (NZL)	Wiggle–Honda	s.t.
9	Aude Biannic (FRA)	Lointek	s.t.
10	Rachel Neylan (AUS)	Australia (national team)	s.t.

General classification after stage 5

	Rider	Team	Time
1	Claudia Lichtenberg (GER)	Giant–Shimano	15h 06' 26"
2	Alena Amialiusik (BLR)	Astana BePink	+ 1' 06"
3	Audrey Cordon (FRA)	France (national team)	+ 1' 44"
4	Aude Biannic (FRA)	Lointek	+ 1' 44"
5	Maaike Polspoel (BEL)	Giant–Shimano	+ 1' 44"
6	Giorgia Bronzini (ITA)	Wiggle–Honda	+ 2' 21"
7	Lizzie Williams (AUS)	Australia (national team)	+ 2' 21"
8	Sabrina Stultiens (NED)	Netherlands (national team)	+ 2' 21"
9	Małgorzata Jasińska (POL)	Alé–Cipollini	+ 2' 21"
10	Amelie Rivat (FRA)	Poitou–Charentes.Futuroscope.86	+ 2' 21"

=== Stage 6 ===
15 August 2014 – Pougues-les-Eaux to Varennes-sur-Allier, 120.5 km (74.9 mi)

Stage 6 result

	Rider	Team	Time
1	Kirsten Wild (NED)	Giant–Shimano	3h 06' 26"
2	Giorgia Bronzini (ITA)	Wiggle–Honda	s.t.
3	Jolien D'Hoore (BEL)	Lotto–Intermarché Ladies	s.t.
4	Barbara Guarischi (ITA)	Alé–Cipollini	s.t.
5	Audrey Cordon (FRA)	France (national team)	s.t.
6	Shelley Olds (USA)	Alé–Cipollini	s.t.
7	Oxana Kozonchuk (RUS)	RusVelo	s.t.
8	Roxane Fournier (FRA)	Poitou–Charentes.Futuroscope.86	s.t.
9	Pascale Jeuland (FRA)	Poitou–Charentes.Futuroscope.86	s.t.
10	Edita Janeliūnaitė (LTU)	Lithuania (national team)	s.t.

General classification after stage 6

	Rider	Team	Time
1	Claudia Lichtenberg (GER)	Giant–Shimano	18h 12' 52"
2	Alena Amialiusik (BLR)	Astana BePink	+ 1' 06"
3	Audrey Cordon (FRA)	France (national team)	+ 1' 44"
4	Aude Biannic (FRA)	Lointek	+ 1' 44"
5	Maaike Polspoel (BEL)	Giant–Shimano	+ 1' 44"
6	Giorgia Bronzini (ITA)	Wiggle–Honda	+ 2' 21"
7	Lizzie Williams (AUS)	Australia (national team)	+ 2' 21"
8	Sabrina Stultiens (NED)	Netherlands (national team)	+ 2' 21"
9	Małgorzata Jasińska (POL)	Alé–Cipollini	+ 2' 21"
10	Amelie Rivat (FRA)	Poitou–Charentes.Futuroscope.86	+ 2' 21"

=== Stage 7 ===
16 August 2014 – Marcigny to Marcigny, 85 km (52.8 mi)

Stage 7 result

	Rider	Team	Time
1	Iris Slappendel (NED)	Netherlands (national team)	3h 28' 24"
2	Alena Amialiusik (BLR)	Astana BePink	+ 2"
3	Claudia Lichtenberg (GER)	Giant–Shimano	+ 6"
4	Aude Biannic (FRA)	Lointek	+ 1' 57"
5	Shelley Olds (USA)	Alé–Cipollini	+ 2' 00"
6	Giorgia Bronzini (ITA)	Wiggle–Honda	+ 2' 00"
7	Lizzie Williams (AUS)	Australia (national team)	+ 2' 00"
8	Maaike Polspoel (BEL)	Giant–Shimano	+ 2' 00"
9	Elena Berlato (ITA)	Alé–Cipollini	+ 2' 00"
10	Małgorzata Jasińska (POL)	Alé–Cipollini	+ 2' 00"

Final general classification

	Rider	Team	Time
1	Claudia Lichtenberg (GER)	Giant–Shimano	21h 41' 22"
2	Alena Amialiusik (BLR)	Astana BePink	+ 1' 02"
3	Aude Biannic (FRA)	Lointek	+ 3' 35"
4	Audrey Cordon (FRA)	France (national team)	+ 3' 38"
5	Maaike Polspoel (BEL)	Giant–Shimano	+ 3' 38"
6	Giorgia Bronzini (ITA)	Wiggle–Honda	+ 4' 15"
7	Lizzie Williams (AUS)	Australia (national team)	+ 4' 15"
8	Sabrina Stultiens (NED)	Netherlands (national team)	+ 4' 15"
9	Małgorzata Jasińska (POL)	Alé–Cipollini	+ 4' 15"
10	Elena Berlato (ITA)	Alé–Cipollini	+ 4' 15"

== Classification leadership ==
Stage	Winner	General classification	Young rider classification	Team classification
1	Claudia Lichtenberg	Claudia Lichtenberg	Sabrina Stultiens	Giant–Shimano
2	Barbara Guarischi	Claudia Lichtenberg	Sabrina Stultiens	Giant–Shimano
3	Giorgia Bronzini	Claudia Lichtenberg	Sabrina Stultiens	Giant–Shimano
4	Kirsten Wild	Claudia Lichtenberg	Sabrina Stultiens	Giant–Shimano
5	Audrey Cordon	Claudia Lichtenberg	Sabrina Stultiens	Giant–Shimano
6	Kirsten Wild	Claudia Lichtenberg	Sabrina Stultiens	Giant–Shimano
7	Iris Slappendel	Claudia Lichtenberg	Sabrina Stultiens	Giant–Shimano
Final		Claudia Lichtenberg	Sabrina Stultiens	Giant–Shimano
