= Francesca Cauz =

Italian cyclist (born 1992)

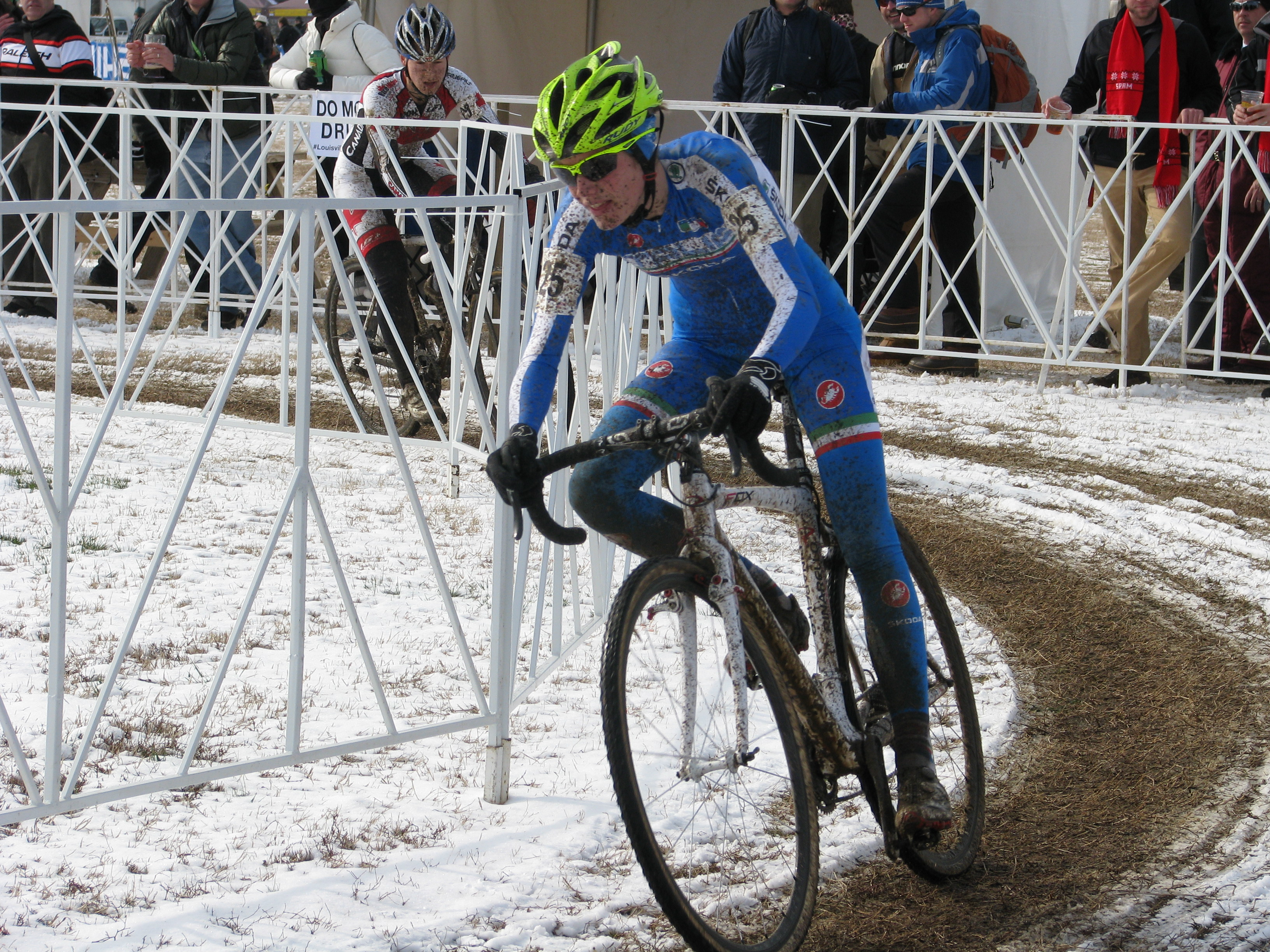
- Cauz in 2013

Personal information
- Full name: Francesca Cauz
- Born: 24 September 1992 (age 34) Conegliano, Italy

Cycling career
- Sport: Cycling
- Disciplines: Road; Cyclo-cross
- Role: Rider

Professional teams
- 2012–2014: Fassa Bortolo–Servetto
- 2015–2016: Alé–Cipollini
- 2017: Giusfredi–Bianchi
- 2018: Top Girls Fassa Bortolo
- 2019: Servetto–Piumate–Beltrami TSA

Francesca Cauz (born 24 September 1992) is an Italian racing cyclist, who last rode for UCI Women's Team Servetto–Piumate–Beltrami TSA.

== Early life ==
Cauz was born in Conegliano and raised in San Fior. Her grandfather, parents and uncles were all professional cyclists, and her sister and cousins raced with the Top Girls Calinferno cycling team.

== Career ==
As a junior, Cauz first raced with Veloce club San Vendemiano, before moving to Verso L’iride where she spent two years as a junior and one year as a professional. She then moved to the Fassa Bortolo–Servetto cycling team in 2012. In 2013, she wore the white jersey at the Giro Rosa. She won the jersey overall after recording two top-three finishes on individual stages and finishing in seventh place in the general classification. She also finished second at the 2013 European Road Championships, and competed in the Road World Championships and cross-country world championship. However in 2014 she struggled from injuries, and was rumoured to be retiring before signing for Alé–Cipollini for the 2015 season. In 2015, Cauz finished in sixth place at the Italian Championships, and 16th place at the Giro Rosa. In 2019, she signed for the Servetto–Piumate–Beltrami TSA team.
