= Chiara Pierobon =

Italian cyclist

Personal information
- Born: 21 January 1993 Mirano, Italy
- Died: 1 August 2015 (aged 22) Ingolstadt, Germany

Cycling career
- Sport: Cycling
- Discipline: Road
- Role: Rider

Professional team
- 2013–2015: Top Girls Fassa Bortolo

Chiara Pierobon (21 January 1993 – 1 August 2015) was an Italian professional racing cyclist. She died from a suspected pulmonary embolism. Pierobon was travelling with her team Top Girls Fassa Bortolo to the Sparkassen Giro in Germany when she fell ill. Prior to her death during the 2015 season, she came in seventh at the Giro del Trentino Alto Adige-Südtirol and ninth at the Durango-Durango Emakumeen Saria.

== See also ==
- Top Girls Fassa Bortolo
