= Elena Berlato =

Italian cyclist

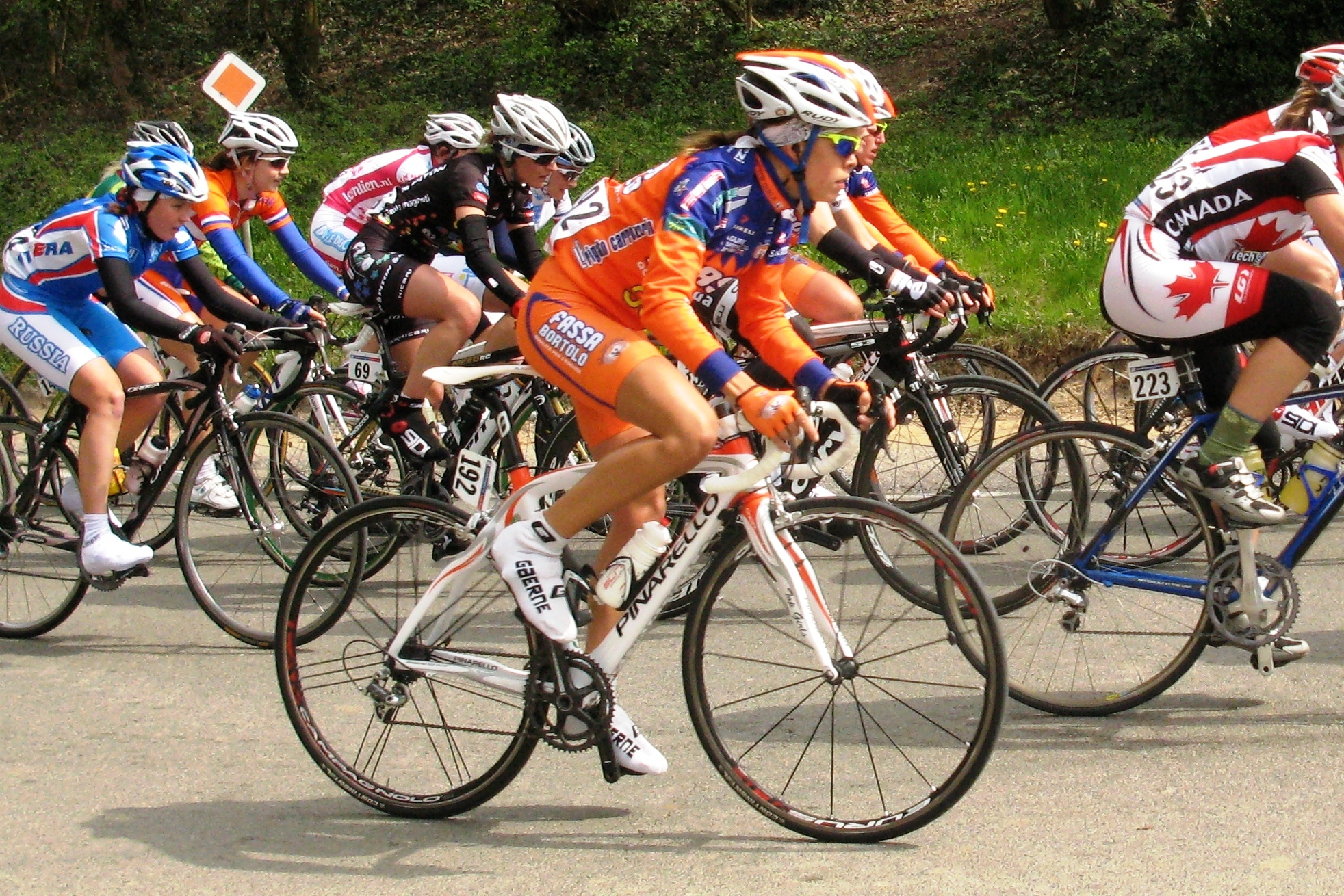
- Elena Berlato in 2010

Personal information
- Born: 2 August 1988 (age 38) Schio, Italy

Cycling career
- Sport: Cycling
- Role: Rider

Elena Berlato (born 2 August 1988) is an Italian professional racing cyclist.

== See also ==
- 2014 Alé Cipollini season
