= UAE Team L'Imad =

Italian cycling team

Team information
- UCI code: UAD
- Registered: United Arab Emirates
- Founded: 2011
- Discipline: Road
- Status: UCI Women's Team (2011–2019); UCI Women's WorldTeam (2020–)
- Bicycles: Colnago

Key personnel
- Team manager: Melissa Moncada

Team name history
- 2011 2012 2013 2014 2015 2016–2019 2020–2021 2022–2026 2026–: Mcipollini–Giordana; MCipollini–Giambenini–Gauss; MCipollini–Giordana; Alé–Cipollini; Alé–Cipollini–Galassia; Alé–Cipollini; Alé BTC Ljubljana; UAE Team ADQ; UAE Team L'Imad

UAE Team L'Imad (styled as UAE Team L'IMAD) is a professional cycling team based in UAE and logistically headquartered in Italy, which competes in elite road bicycle racing events such as the UCI Women's World Tour. In the 2024 season, it had a roster of sixteen riders representing eleven different nationalities.

The title sponsor of the team is L'Imad, a sovereign wealth fund in the United Arab Emirates chaired by Tahnoun bin Zayed Al Nahyan.

== Team history ==
In September 2019, the team announced they had brought onboard Slovenian co-title sponsor, BTC Ljubljana, for the 2020 season; enabling the squad to apply for top-tier UCI Women's WorldTour status through to the end of the 2023 season with the name of Alé BTC Ljubljana.

In October 2021, UAE Team Emirates confirmed it would take over and rebrand the team, joining a growing list of men's teams that have a top-level women's team. In mid-December 2021, the team kit for the 2022 season was revealed, along with the new team name, UAE Team ADQ, with the team bringing on sovereign wealth fund Abu Dhabi Developmental Holding Company (ADQ) as an additional sponsor.

The managerial leadership passed to former cyclist Rubens Bertogliati, who is still supported by Lacquaniti, while the squad for the 2022 season is made up of fifteen riders, including the confirmed riders Bastianelli, Bujak and García.

In the 2023 season, UAE Team ADQ heavily restructured its technical staff and athletes. Among others, two strong Italian athletes such as Silvia Persico and Chiara Consonni arrived. In November 2023, Maria Camila Garcia was appointed CEO of the team.

As of April 2026, the team's sponsors include indoor cycling software MyWhoosh, bicycle manufacturer Colnago, International Holding Company, ADQ, Analog and NMDC Group.

== Kit and equipment ==
For the 2026 WorldTour season, the team's bicycle framesets were Colnago-made, with Shimano groupsets, ENVE wheels, and components from Colnago, ENVE, Continental, Fizik, Elite, and Wahoo.

== Team roster ==
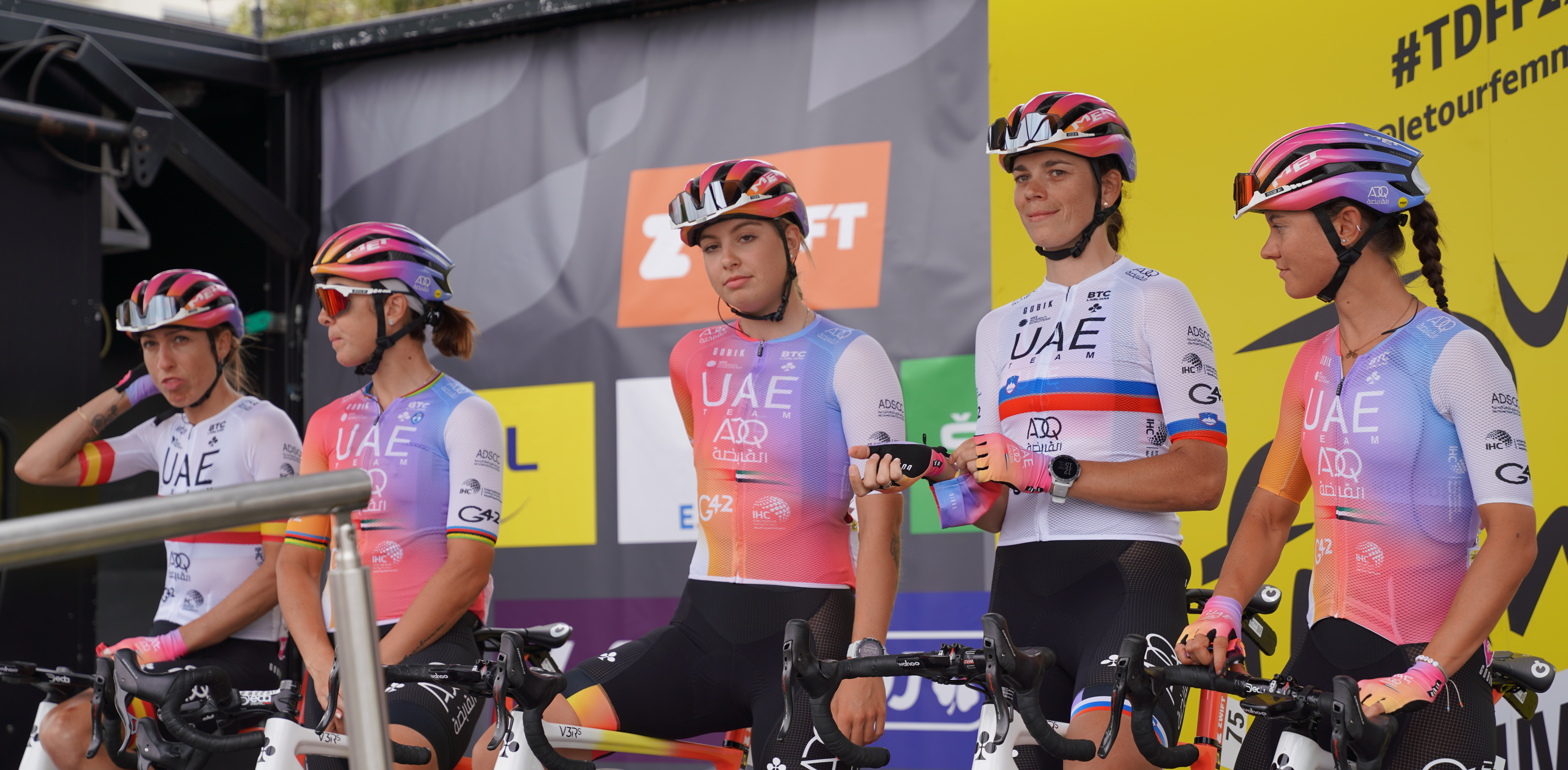
Riders at the 2022 Tour de France Femmes.

As of 19 July 2025.

| Rider | Date of birth |
|---|---|
| Safia Al Sayegh (UAE) | 23 September 2001 (age 24) |
| Alena Amialiusik (BLR) | 6 February 1989 (age 37) |
| Elynor Bäckstedt (GBR) | 6 December 2001 (age 24) |
| Sofia Bertizzolo (ITA) | 21 August 1997 (age 29) |
| Paula Blasi (ESP) | 19 February 2003 (age 23) |
| Brodie Chapman (AUS) | 9 April 1991 (age 35) |
| Eleonora Camilla Gasparrini (ITA) | 25 March 2002 (age 24) |
| Lara Gillespie (IRL) | 21 April 2001 (age 25) |
| Lizzie Holden (GBR) | 12 September 1997 (age 28) |
| Alena Ivanchenko (RUS) | 16 November 2003 (age 22) |

| Rider | Date of birth |
|---|---|
| Elisa Longo Borghini (ITA) | 10 December 1991 (age 34) |
| Erica Magnaldi (ITA) | 24 August 1992 (age 34) |
| Greta Marturano (ITA) | 28 June 1998 (age 28) |
| Tereza Neumanová (CZE) | 9 August 1998 (age 28) |
| Silvia Persico (ITA) | 25 July 1997 (age 29) |
| Maëva Squiban (FRA) | 19 March 2002 (age 24) |
| Karlijn Swinkels (NED) | 28 October 1998 (age 27) |
| Sofie van Rooijen (NED) | 13 July 2002 (age 24) |
| Dominika Włodarczyk (POL) | 27 January 2001 (age 25) |

== Major wins ==
2011
Stage 3, Ladies Tour of Qatar, Monia Baccaille
Stage 5, Giro d'Italia Femminile, Nicole Cooke
Gp Cento Carnevale D'europa, Monia Baccaille
2012
Grand Prix de Dottignies, Monia Baccaille
Stage 2, Tour of Chongming Island, Monia Baccaille
Overall Trophée d'Or Féminin, Elena Cecchini

Stage 1, Elena Cecchini
Stage 3, Susanna Zorzi

Overall Giro Toscana Femminile, Małgorzata Jasińska

Stage 2, Małgorzata Jasińska

2013
Stage 5, Energiewacht Tour, Valentina Carretta
Mountains classification Festival Luxembourgeois du cyclisme féminin, Valentina Scandolara
Italian rider classification Giro Rosa, Tatiana Guderzo
Stage 2, Tour Féminin en Limousin, Tatiana Antoshina
Stage 6, Thüringen Rundfahrt der Frauen, Valentina Scandolara
Stage 7, Thüringen Rundfahrt der Frauen, Tatiana Guderzo
Stage 6, Holland Ladies Tour, Tatiana Guderzo
2014
Sprints classification Vuelta Internacional Femenina a Costa Rica, Shelley Olds

Stages 3 & 5, Shelley Olds

GP Comune di Cornaredo, Shelley Olds
Sprints classification Energiewacht Tour, Marta Tagliaferro
Winston-Salem Cycling Classic, Shelley Olds
Stage 2, La Route de France, Barbara Guarischi
Points classification Trophée d'Or Féminin, Barbara Guarischi

Teams classification
Stage 3, Barbara Guarischi

Overall Giro della Toscana Int. Femminile – Memorial Michela Fanini, Shelley Olds

Points classification, Shelley Olds
Mountains classification, Małgorzata Jasińska
Prologue & Stage 1, Shelley Olds
Stage 2, Małgorzata Jasińska

2015
Young rider classification Ladies Tour of Qatar, Beatrice Bartelloni

Stage 1, Annalisa Cucinotta

Stage 4, Giro d'Italia Femminile, Annalisa Cucinotta
Stage 2, Ladies Tour of Norway, Shelley Olds
Overall Giro della Toscana Int. Femminile – Memorial Michela Fanini, Małgorzata Jasińska

Stage 2, Małgorzata Jasińska

La Madrid Challenge by La Vuelta, Shelley Olds
2016
Gran Prix San Luis Femenino, Małgorzata Jasińska
Teams classification Tour Femenino de San Luis

Stage 2, Marta Tagliaferro

Omloop van het Hageland, Marta Bastianelli
GP della Liberazione, Marta Bastianelli
Stage 5, Gracia–Orlová, Marta Tagliaferro
2017
Points classification Santos Women's Tour, Chloe Hosking

Mountains classification, Janneke Ensing
Stage 3, Chloe Hosking

Drentse Acht van Westerveld, Chloe Hosking
GP della Liberazione, Marta Bastianelli
Stage 1, Emakumeen Euskal Bira, Marta Bastianelli
Stage 3, The Women's Tour, Chloe Hosking
Stage 9, Giro d'Italia Femminile, Marta Bastianelli
Sprints classification Ladies Tour of Norway, Daiva Tušlaitė

Mountains classification, Janneke Ensing
Stage 2, Chloe Hosking

Stage 6, Holland Ladies Tour, Janneke Ensing
2018
Stage 4, Women's Tour Down Under, Chloe Hosking
Cadel Evans Great Ocean Road Race, Chloe Hosking
Points classification Women's Herald Sun Tour, Chloe Hosking
Stage 2, Setmana Ciclista Valenciana, Marta Bastianelli
Le Samyn des Dames, Janneke Ensing
Gold Trophy in Euro-Women's Bike Race, Marta Bastianelli
Gent–Wevelgem, Marta Bastianelli
Grand Prix de Dottignies, Marta Bastianelli
Brabantse Pijl Dames Gooik, Marta Bastianelli
Commonwealth Games Road Race, Chloe Hosking
Trofee Maarten Wynants, Marta Bastianelli
Basque rider classification Emakumeen Euskal Bira, Ane Santesteban
Stage 3, BeNe Ladies Tour, Marta Bastianelli
Overall Giro della Toscana Int. Femminile – Memorial Michela Fanini, Soraya Paladin

Stage 1, Marta Bastianelli
Stage 2, Soraya Paladin

2019
Mountains classification Women's Tour Down Under, Nadia Quagliotto

Stage 4, Chloe Hosking

Points classification Women's Herald Sun Tour, Chloe Hosking
Points classification Vuelta a Burgos Feminas, Soraya Paladin

Stage 1, Karlijn Swinkels
Stages 2 & 3, Soraya Paladin

German rider classification Thüringen Rundfahrt der Frauen, Romy Kasper
Stage 2a, BeNe Ladies Tour, Jelena Erić
Mountains classification Giro della Toscana Int. Femminile – Memorial Michela Fanini, Soraya Paladin

Stage 1, Chloe Hosking
Stage 2, Soraya Paladin

Overall Giro delle Marche in Rosa, Soraya Paladin

Mountains classification, Soraya Paladin
Stage 3, Soraya Paladin

Tour of Guangxi Women's WorldTour, Chloe Hosking
2020
Vuelta a la Comunitat Valenciana Feminas, Marta Bastianelli
2021
Stage 2, Vuelta a Burgos Feminas, Anastasia Chursina
Stage 2, Tour de Suisse, Marta Bastianelli
La Périgord Ladies, Marta Bastianelli
Stage 2, (ITT) Holland Ladies Tour, Marlen Reusser
Stage 1, Challenge by La Vuelta, Marlen Reusser
Stage 5, Tour Cycliste Féminin International de l'Ardèche, Marta Bastianelli
Giro dell'Emilia Internazionale Donne Elite, Marta Bastianelli
Stage 1, The Women's Tour, Marta Bastianelli
Chrono des Nations, Marlen Reusser
2022
Vuelta a la Comunitat Valenciana Feminas, Marta Bastianelli
Mountains classification Setmana Ciclista Valenciana

Stage 4, Marta Bastianelli

Omloop van het Hageland, Marta Bastianelli
Trofeo Oro in Euro–Women’s Bike Race, Sofia Bertizzolo
Omloop van Borsele, Maaike Boogaard
Overall Grand Prix Elsy Jacobs, Marta Bastianelli

Points classification, Marta Bastianelli
Team classification
Stage 1, Marta Bastianelli

Points classification Bretagne Ladies Tour, Marta Bastianelli

Stage 1 & 2, Marta Bastianelli
Stage 3, Alena Ivanchenko

Stage 3, Vuelta a Burgos Feminas, Margarita Victoria García
2023
Stage 3, Tour de Suisse, Eleonora Gasparrini
Stage 9, Giro d'Italia, Chiara Consonni
Overall Tour of Chongming Island, Chiara Consonni

Stage 3, Chiara Consonni

2024
Stage 2, Giro d'Italia, Chiara Consonni
2025
Overall UAE Tour, Elisa Longo Borghini

Stage 3, Elisa Longo Borghini

Brabantse Pijl, Elisa Longo Borghini
Dwars door Vlaanderen, Elisa Longo Borghini
2026
Clásica de Almería, Federica Venturelli

== National and continental champions ==
2011
Italy Track (Team Sprint), Elisa Frisoni
Italy Track (Scratch race), Tatiana Guderzo
Italy Track (500m TT), Elisa Frisoni
Italy Track (Sprint), Elisa Frisoni
2012
Italy Time Trial, Tatiana Guderzo
2013
Russia Time Trial, Tatiana Antoshina
Italy Time Trial, Tatiana Guderzo
Italy Track (Omnium), Marta Tagliaferro
Italy Track (Team Pursuit), Marta Tagliaferro
Italy Track (Team Pursuit), Tatiana Guderzo
2014
Italy Track (Team Pursuit), Marta Tagliaferro
Italy Track (Team Pursuit), Tatiana Guderzo
2015
Poland Road Race, Małgorzata Jasińska
2016
Italy Track (Points Race), Maria Giulia Confalonieri
2017
Lithuania Road Race, Daiva Tušlaitė
2018
Lithuania Time Trial, Daiva Tušlaitė
European Road Race, Marta Bastianelli
2019
Japan Time Trial, Eri Yonamine
Japan Road Race, Eri Yonamine
2020
Slovenia Road Race, Urša Pintar
Slovenia Time Trial, Urška Žigart
Spain Time Trial, Mavi García
Spain Road Race, Mavi García
Thailand Road Race, Jutatip Maneephan
2021
Swiss Time Trial, Marlen Reusser
Swiss Road Race, Marlen Reusser
Slovenia Time Trial, Eugenia Bujak
Slovenia Road Race, Eugenia Bujak
Spain Time Trial, Mavi Garcia
Spain Road Race, Mavi García
2022
UAE Time Trial, Safia Al Sayegh
UAE Road Race, Safia Al Sayegh
Spain Time Trial, Mavi García
Spain Road Race, Mavi García
2023
British Time Trial, Elizabeth Holden
UAE Time Trial, Safia Al Sayegh
UAE Road Race, Safia Al Sayegh
2024
Polish Road Race, Dominika Włodarczyk
Latvian Road Race, Anastasia Carbonari
UAE Time Trial, Safia Al Sayegh
UAE Road Race, Safia Al Sayegh
2025
Australian Time Trial, Brodie Chapman
UAE Time Trial, Safia Al Sayegh
