= Elena Valentini =

Italian cyclist

Personal information
- Born: 30 March 1992 (age 34) Bolzano, Italy

Cycling career
- Sport: Cycling
- Role: Rider

Elena Valentini (born 30 March 1992) is an Italian racing cyclist. She rode at the 2014 UCI Road World Championships.
