= 2017 Liège–Bastogne–Liège Femmes =

2017 UCI Women's World Tour, race 8 of 20
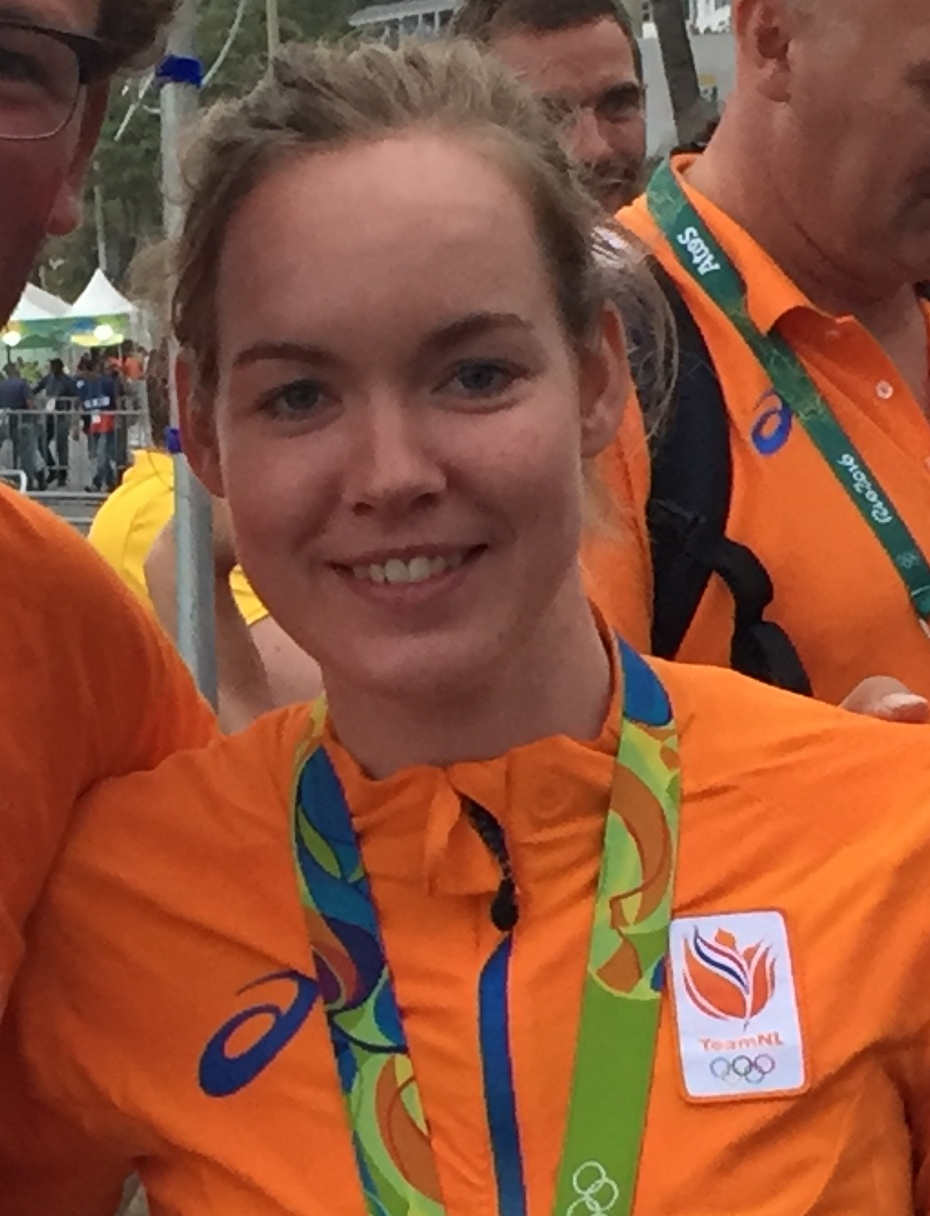
- Anna van der Breggen won the inaugural Liège–Bastogne–Liège Femmes

Race details
- Dates: 23 April 2017
- Stages: 1
- Distance: 135.5 km (84.2 mi)
- Winning time: 3h 42' 17"

Results
	Winner	Anna van der Breggen (NED)	(Boels–Dolmans)
	Second	Lizzie Deignan (GBR)	(Boels–Dolmans)
	Third	Katarzyna Niewiadoma (POL)	(WM3 Energie)

The first edition of Liège–Bastogne–Liège Femmes, a road cycling one-day race in Belgium, was held on 23 April 2017. It was the eighth event of the 2017 UCI Women's World Tour. The race started in Bastogne and finished in Ans, containing four categorized climbs and covering a total distance of 135.5 km. 139 riders started the race, 98 finished.

Dutch rider and reigning Olympic road race champion Anna van der Breggen won the event, thus completing a set of wins in all three races of the Ardennes classics. Van der Breggen had already won Amstel Gold Race and La Flèche Wallonne in the week leading up to Liège–Bastogne–Liège. All three races had the same runner-up and third-place finisher on the podium.

== Race summary ==
The first climb of the day, the Côte de la Vecquée, caused a first selection in the peloton. Tiffany Cromwell broke clear, but was caught on the slopes of the Côte de La Redoute by the peloton, under the impulse of Orica–Scott. By the top of La Redoute, 40 riders remained in the lead group. Roxane Knetemann broke away, but was caught on the Côte de la Roche aux Faucons as Boels–Dolmans were leading the chase.

At 20 km from the finish, Polish rider Katarzyna Niewiadoma attacked on the upper slopes of the Roche aux Faucons and was rejoined by Lizzie Deignan, Anna van der Breggen, Ashleigh Moolman and Elisa Longo Borghini. On the last climb, the Côte de Saint-Nicolas, Niewiadoma accelerated from the quintet, but her move was marked by van der Breggen who broke clear just after the top of Saint-Nicolas and powered on solo to the finish. Lizzie Deignan took second place before Niewiadoma.

== Result ==
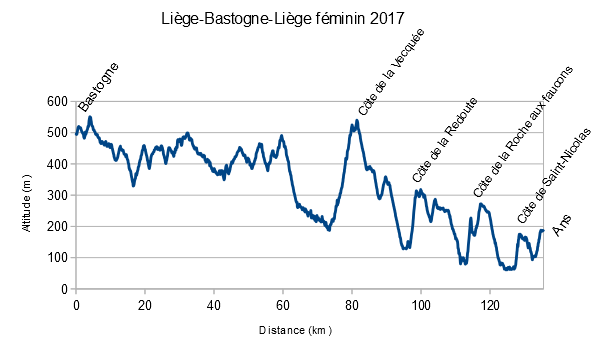
Profile of the 2017 women's event

Final general classification

Rank	Rider	Team	Time
1	Anna van der Breggen (NED)	Boels–Dolmans	3h 42' 17"
2	Elizabeth Deignan (GBR)	Boels–Dolmans	+ 17"
3	Katarzyna Niewiadoma (POL)	WM3 Energie	+ 19"
4	Ellen van Dijk (NED)	Team Sunweb	+ 31"
5	Annemiek van Vleuten (NED)	Orica–Scott	s.t.
6	Ashleigh Moolman (RSA)	Cervélo–Bigla Pro Cycling	s.t.
7	Shara Gillow (AUS)	FDJ Nouvelle-Aquitaine Futuroscope	s.t.
8	Olga Zabelinskaya (RUS)	Bepink–Cogeas	s.t.
9	Elisa Longo Borghini (ITA)	Wiggle High5	+ 34"
10	Cecilie Uttrup Ludwig (DEN)	Cervélo–Bigla Pro Cycling	+ 41"
