= Anna van der Breggen =

Dutch cyclist (born 1990)

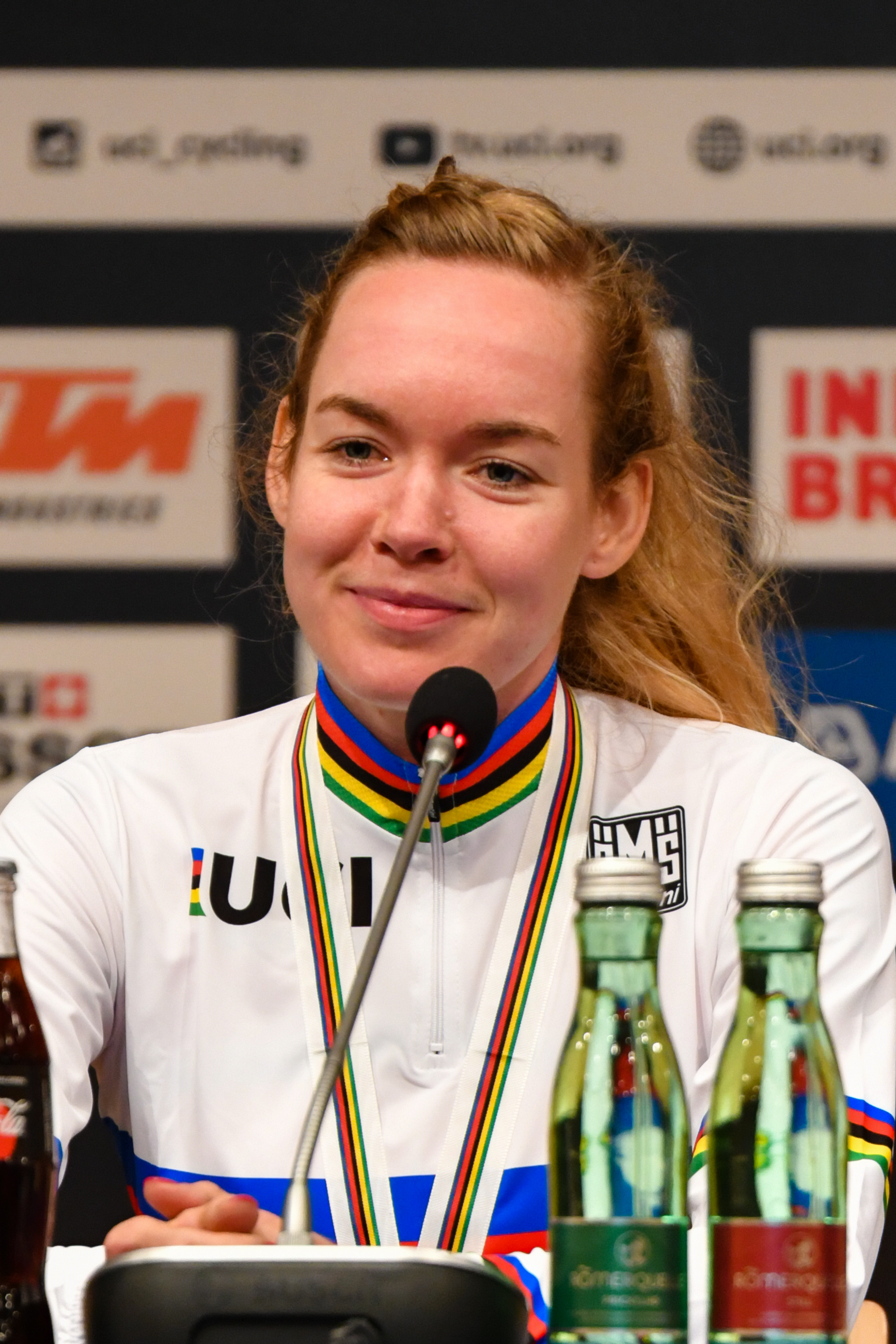
- Van der Breggen in 2018

Personal information
- Full name: Anna van der Breggen
- Born: 18 April 1990 (age 36) Zwolle, Netherlands
- Height: 1.68 m (5 ft 6 in)
- Weight: 56 kg (123 lb)

Cycling career
- Sport: Cycling
- Current team: Team SD Worx–Protime
- Discipline: Road
- Role: Rider; Directeur sportif
- Rider type: All-rounder

Amateur team
- WV Noordwesthoek

Professional teams
- 2009: Team Flexpoint
- 2012–2013: Sengers Ladies Cycling Team
- 2014–2016: Rabobank-Liv Woman Cycling Team
- 2017–2021: SD Worx
- 2025-: Team SD Worx–Protime

Managerial team
- 2022–2024: Team SD Worx–Protime

Major wins
- Major Tours Giro d'Italia Women General classification (2015, 2017, 2020, 2021) 5 individual stages (2015, 2019, 2021, 2026) La Vuelta Femenina 2 individual stages (2025, 2026) Stage races Vuelta a Burgos (2021) Tour of California (2017, 2019) Tour of Norway (2014) Grand Prix Elsy Jacobs (2014, 2015) Tour de Bretagne (2012) One-day races and Classics Olympic Games Road Race (2016) World Road Race Championships (2018, 2020) World Time Trial Championships (2020) European Road Race Championships (2016) European Time Trial Championships (2020) National Road Race Championships (2020) National Time Trial Championships (2015, 2021) Liège–Bastogne–Liège (2017, 2018) Tour of Flanders (2018) La Flèche Wallonne (2015–2021) Amstel Gold Race (2017) Strade Bianche (2018) GP de Plouay (2019) Omloop Het Nieuwsblad (2015, 2021) La Course by Le Tour de France (2015)
Medal record
Women's road cycling
Representing Netherlands
Olympic Games
Gold medal – first place	2016 Rio de Janeiro	Road race
Bronze medal – third place	2016 Rio de Janeiro	Time trial
Bronze medal – third place	2020 Tokyo	Time trial
World Championships
Gold medal – first place	2018 Innsbruck	Road race
Gold medal – first place	2020 Imola	Road race
Gold medal – first place	2020 Imola	Time trial
Silver medal – second place	2015 Richmond	Road race
Silver medal – second place	2015 Richmond	Time trial
Silver medal – second place	2017 Bergen	Time trial
Silver medal – second place	2018 Innsbruck	Time trial
Silver medal – second place	2019 Harrogate	Road race
Silver medal – second place	2019 Harrogate	Time trial
Silver medal – second place	2025 Kigali	Time trial
European Championships
Gold medal – first place	2016 Plumelec	Road race
Gold medal – first place	2020 Plouay	Time trial
Silver medal – second place	2016 Plumelec	Time trial
Silver medal – second place	2018 Glasgow	Time trial
Bronze medal – third place	2017 Herning	Time trial
Bronze medal – third place	2025 Guilherand-Granges	Road race
European Games
Bronze medal – third place	2015 Baku	Road race
Representing Rabobank-Liv Woman Cycling Team (2015) Boels–Dolmans (2017–2018)
World Championships
Bronze medal – third place	2015 Richmond	Team time trial
Silver medal – second place	2017 Bergen	Team time trial
Silver medal – second place	2018 Innsbruck	Team time trial

Anna van der Breggen (born 18 April 1990) is a Dutch professional road bicycle racer, who rode professionally between 2009 and 2021 for Team Flexpoint, Sengers Ladies Cycling Team, Rabobank-Liv Woman Cycling Team and SD Worx. She won the gold medal in the women's road race at the 2016 Summer Olympics in Rio de Janeiro, and has won the Giro d'Italia Femminile on four occasions. In 2018 and 2020, she won the women's road race at the UCI Road World Championships.

Considered one of the most versatile riders of her generation, van der Breggen excelled in both the one-day classics and stage races, particularly on hilly courses. Apart from the Olympic road race title and three Giro Rosa titles, other notable wins include seven consecutive wins at La Flèche Wallonne, Liège–Bastogne–Liège twice, the Tour of Flanders, Amstel Gold Race, Strade Bianche, Omloop Het Nieuwsblad and the European Road Race Championships. In addition, she has won the general classification and numerous stages in smaller stage races.

In 2017, she won all three Ardennes classics races in one week, which earned her the nickname Queen of the Ardennes. She went on to secure her second Giro d'Italia win the following summer. In April 2019, she won the La Flèche Wallonne Féminine, her fifth consecutive win in the race. In 2020, she won both the Individual Time Trial as well as the Road Race at the UCI World Championships.

Following her retirement at the end of the 2021 season, van der Breggen worked as a directeur sportif for her final professional team, UCI Women's WorldTeam Team SD Worx–Protime. In June 2024, she announced that she would return to racing for the 2025 season.

== Career ==
=== Early life and amateur career ===
Anna van der Breggen was born in Zwolle into a cycling family. She has three brothers and a sister who all practiced cycling at some point. She started bike-racing at the age of seven with the local club WV Noordwesthoek and became more serious about it in the juniors category. In 2007, aged 17, she was fifth in the juniors world championship road race in Aguascalientes but had a difficult transition to the elite category. She considered quitting the sport after she suffered in the back of the peloton during the Grote Prijs Gerrie Knetemann.

=== 2012–2013: Turning professional ===
Van der Breggen turned professional in 2012 with the Sengers Ladies Cycling Team. In April, she took a ninth-placed finish at the Tour of Flanders, and in July, she won the Tour de Bretagne Féminin. She won three of the four stages and secured the overall classification with a lead of almost three minutes over Sofie De Vuyst. She also won the time trial at the Tour Féminin en Limousin as well as the gold medal in the women's under-23 time-trialling event at the European championships. As a result, she was selected for the 2012 World Championships. Whilst playing a domestique role for her team leader, Marianne Vos, she managed to finish fifth herself in the road race.

In 2013 she devoted herself to finishing her studies and rode a low-key season, with the highlight of the year a fourth place at the Trofeo Alfredo Binda. After she obtained her nursing degree, she became a full-time professional cyclist and finished 18th in the Giro Rosa in the summer. She was selected to compete in the World Championships in Florence where she finished fourth in the road race. In preparation for the 2014 season, she announced she would be joining the Rabobank-Liv Woman Cycling Team team.

=== 2014: Stage race success ===
Van der Breggen's first season on the Rabo team proved highly fruitful. She opened the year with top-10 finishes in the Ronde van Drenthe, Trofeo Alfredo Binda, and the Tour of Flanders, and started showing her stage racing potential throughout the season. She claimed notable wins in the overall classification of both the Ladies Tour of Norway and Grand Prix Elsy Jacobs in Luxembourg; as well as a runner-up spot in the Belgium Tour and third places in the Emakumeen Euskal Bira and the Giro Rosa, in a podium made up entirely of Rabobank-Liv Woman Cycling Team riders.

Her season came to an abrupt end when she broke her pelvis at the UCI Road World Championships in Ponferrada, Spain. Her teammate Annemiek van Vleuten crashed just before the finish of the Women's Team Time Trial after clipping the roadside barriers and brought down van der Breggen and two other riders. Van der Breggen broke her ilium and was transported to hospital.

=== 2015: First Giro Rosa win ===
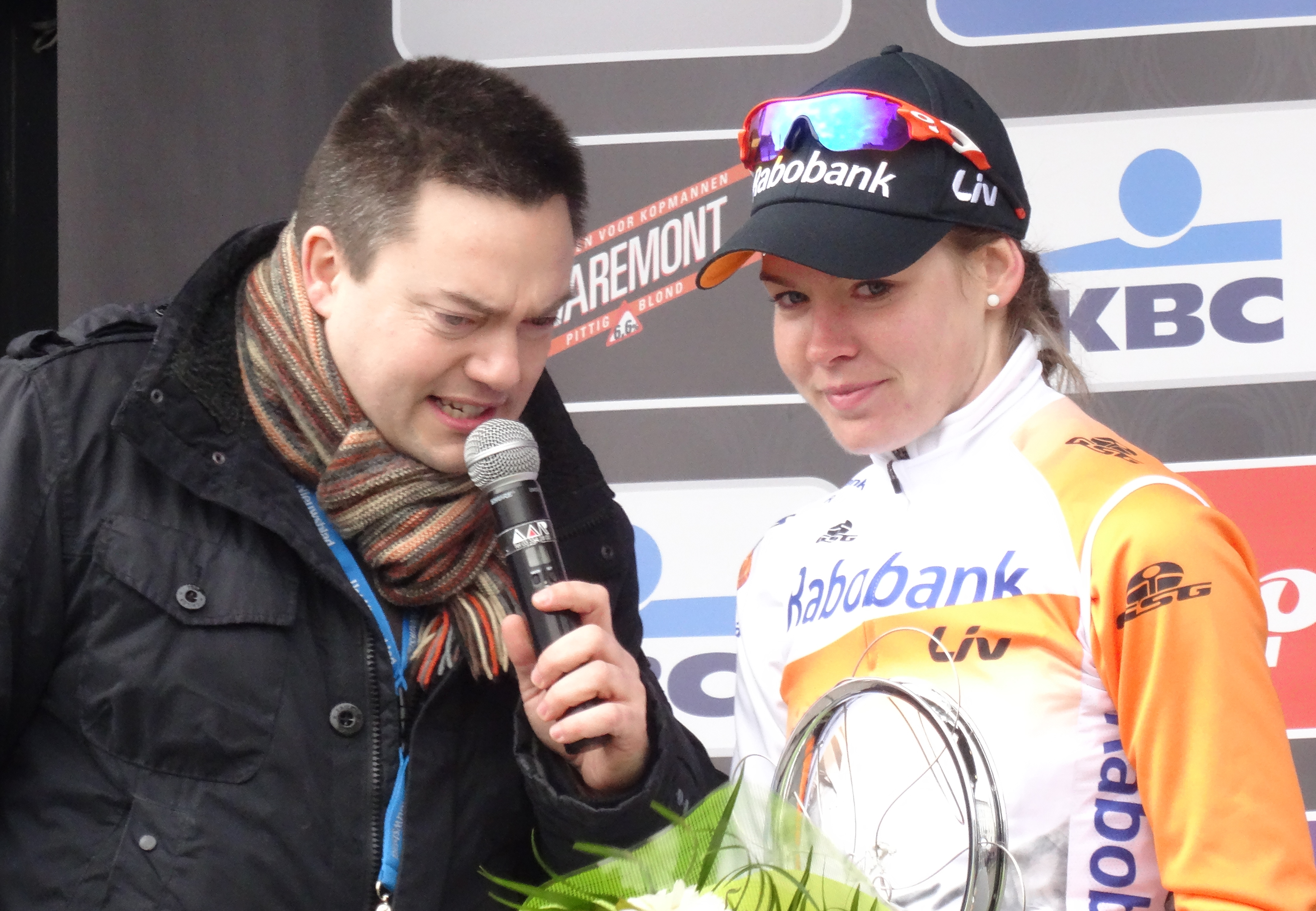
On the podium in Ghent after winning 2015 Omloop Het Nieuwsblad

She recovered from her pelvic fracture in the winter of 2015 and won her first major classic, the Omloop Het Nieuwsblad, in late February. Van der Breggen had broken away from a lead group together with Ellen van Dijk on the Molenberg, at 30 kilometres (19 miles) from the finish. She beat her fellow Dutch in the sprint. The following week, she was second in Le Samyn des Dames. In April she won La Flèche Wallonne with an attack at the foot of the Mur de Huy, and recorded several podium positions in one-day races. She highlighted her stage race potential again by taking the overall classification at the Grand Prix Elsy Jacobs, which she led from the prologue to the end of the race.

In June, she won the bronze medal in the women's road race at the inaugural European Games in Baku. She was part of a four-woman breakaway together with Ellen van Dijk, Katarzyna Niewiadoma and Alena Amialiusik, when an acceleration by van der Breggen caused her teammate van Dijk to be dropped, for the race to be decided in a three-up sprint. Van der Breggen led out the sprint from afar but was passed by both Amialiusik and Niewiadoma.

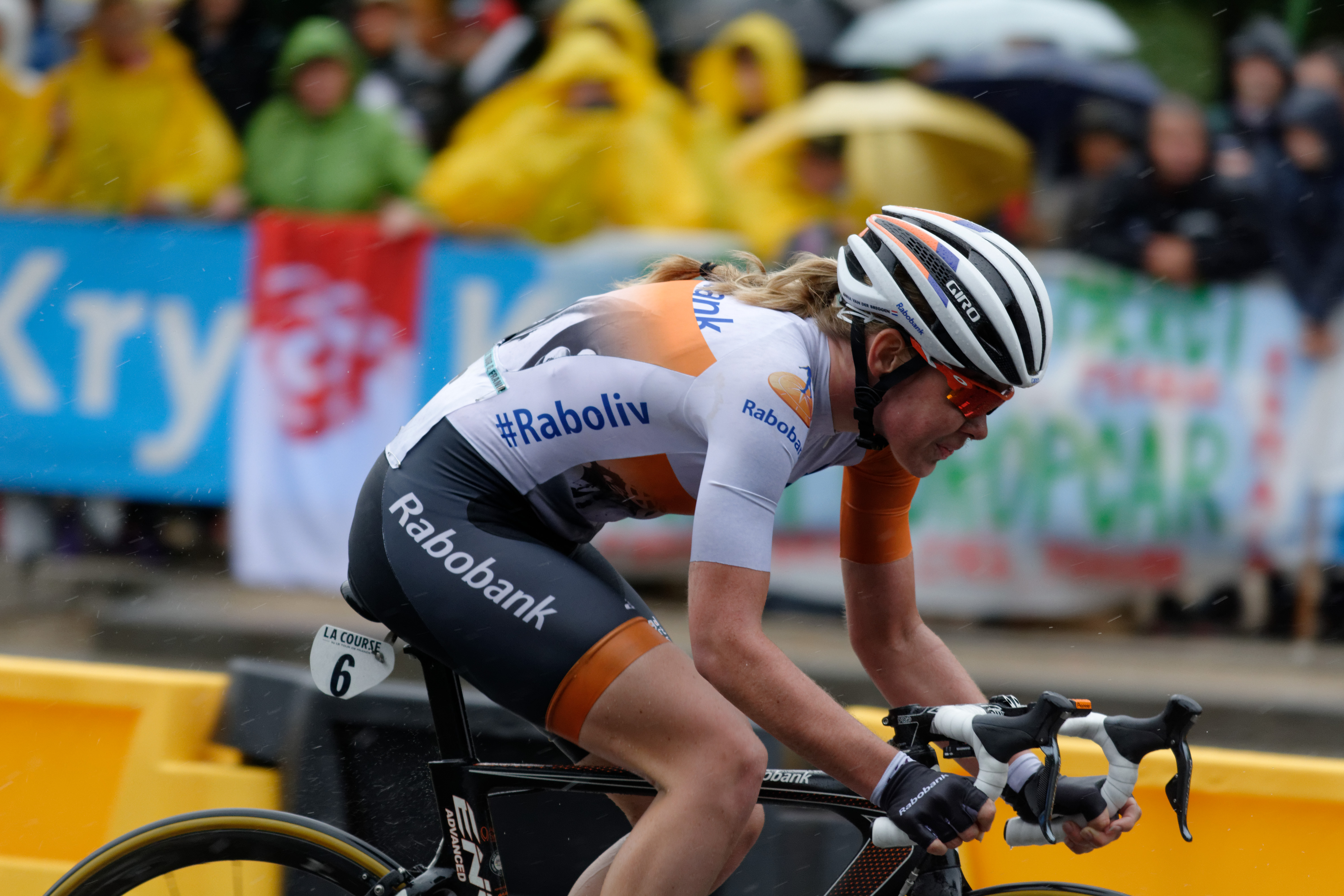
Van der Breggen soloed to victory at the second La Course on the Champs-Élysées in Paris.

Van der Breggen claimed her greatest career victory to that point in July when she won the general classification at the Giro d'Italia Femminile, the most important stage race on the women's calendar and the only Grand Tour for women. She finished fourth in the prologue and second in stage 2, after which she remained in the top-three until the Alpine stages. Van der Breggen was in third position overall behind maglia rosa wearer Megan Guarnier, when she moved into the race lead on the penultimate day after winning the individual time trial to Nebbiuno. She won the time trial more than one minute ahead of Guarnier and secured her overall win with a second place in the final stage. Later she won the second edition of La Course by Le Tour de France on the Champs-Élysées; and she won the final stage of the Belgium Tour in Geraardsbergen.

At the World Championships in September in Richmond, she claimed the silver medals in both the individual time trial and the road race. She finished at two seconds from Linda Villumsen in the time trial, and was narrowly beaten by Lizzie Armitstead in the road race after she started the sprint from afar. She ended the year as second in the UCI Road World Cup, behind Armitstead, and was awarded the Gerrit Schulte Trophy for best female Dutch cyclist of the year.

=== 2016: Olympic and European champion ===
Van der Breggen opened the 2016 season with 5th place at the Strade Bianche, 4th at the Ronde van Drenthe and 6th at the Trofeo Alfredo Binda in March; but failed to claim a victory until she successfully defended her title at La Flèche Wallonne. She counterattacked a move by Katarzyna Niewiadoma on the Côte de Cherave, at 10 kilometres (6.2 miles) from the finish, and was followed by only four others over the top. She broke clear again with Evelyn Stevens at 3 kilometres (1.9 miles) from the finish and powered away from Stevens on the finishing Mur de Huy to claim her second victory in succession.

In July, she finished third overall in the Giro Rosa. She was third in the prologue, but lost time in the mountain stages in the Dolomites. She climbed back to third place after finishing second in stage 7's individual time trial and held on to her podium place until the finish. During the Giro she announced she would leave Rabobank-Liv Woman Cycling Team to join Boels–Dolmans for the 2017 season onwards.

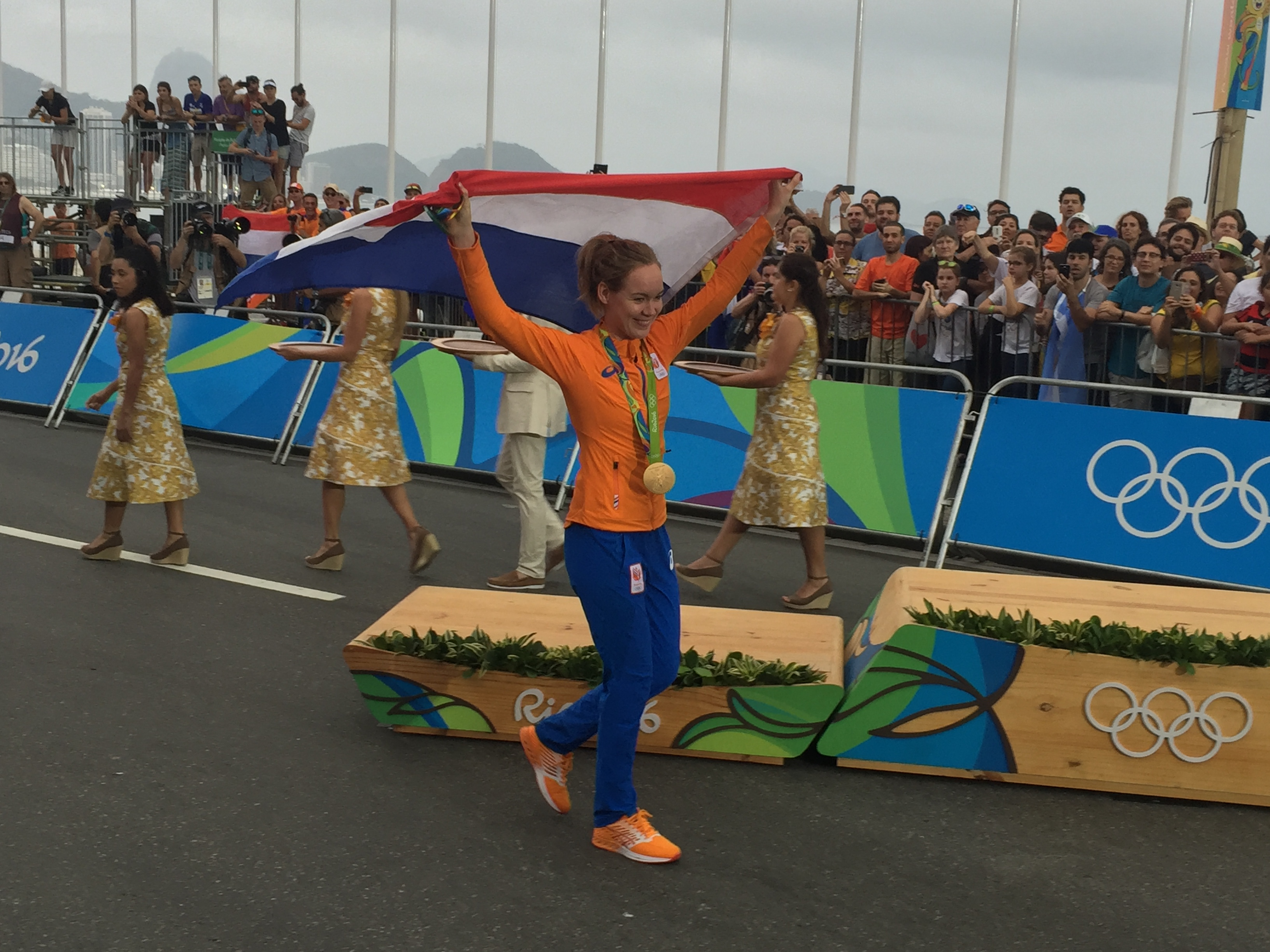
Anna van der Breggen during the podium ceremony of the Olympic road race in Rio after winning the gold medal.

On 7 August 2016, van der Breggen won the gold medal in the women's road race at the Rio Olympics. On the final climb, the 9-kilometre (5.6-mile) long Vista Chinesa, five riders had remained in the front: van der Breggen and her teammate Annemiek van Vleuten, American Mara Abbott, Italian Elisa Longo Borghini and Sweden's Emma Johansson. Van Vleuten jumped away shortly before the top and only Abbott managed to join. In the sinuous descent that followed, van Vleuten distanced Abbott and looked on her way to win the race, when she crashed into a concrete banking with 10 kilometres (6.2 miles) to go and needed to be transported to hospital. Suddenly Abbott seemed on her way to Olympic glory but she was caught back by the three upcoming riders at 500 metres (1,600 feet) from the finish. Van der Breggen beat Johansson and Longo Borghini in the three-up sprint on Copacabana Beach to become Olympic road race champion. Three days later she won the bronze medal in the individual time trial, 11 seconds behind winner Kristin Armstrong. Following her Olympic success, she was knighted in the Order of Orange-Nassau.

In mid-September, she took part in the European Road Championships. She finished second in the time trial behind Ellen van Dijk. In the road race she followed an acceleration of Niewiadoma on the final climb, together with Longo Borghini, Alena Amialiusik and Rasa Leleivytė. Van der Breggen launched the five-woman sprint from afar and became the first ever professional European road race champion. At the World Championships in October, she was a disappointing 13th in the time trial and 87th in the road race, telling reporters she "didn't have the legs anymore after a long season".

=== 2017: Ardennes Triple and second Giro win ===
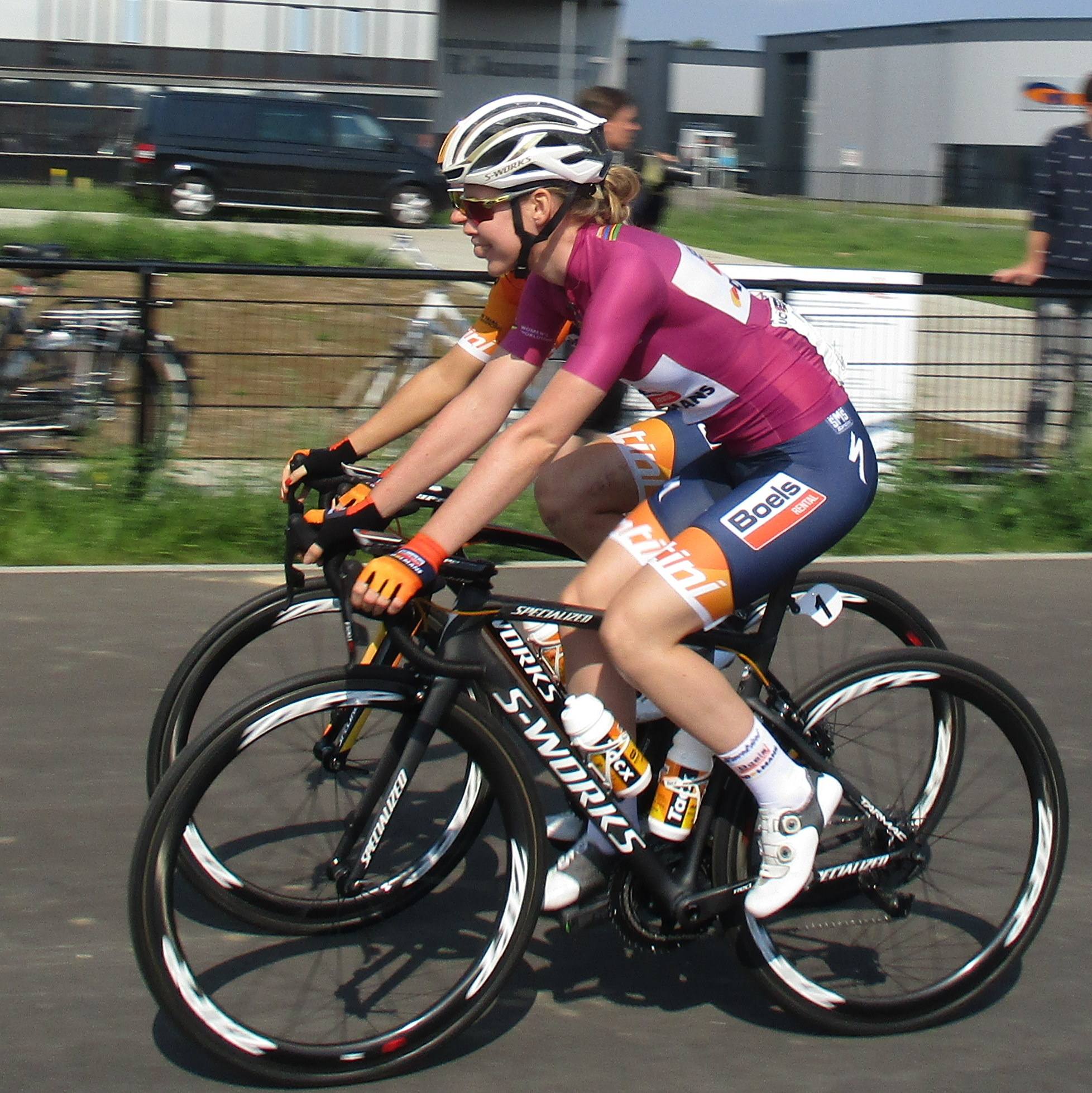
Van der Breggen ended 2017 as winner of the Women's World Tour (pictured in the World Tour leader's jersey at the 2017 Holland Ladies Tour)

After placing 15th in both the Ronde van Drenthe and the Tour of Flanders, and finishing second overall in the Healthy Ageing Tour in early 2017, van der Breggen became the first woman to win all three of the Ardennes classics in a single year. She won the rebooted Amstel Gold Race with an attack at 8 kilometres (5.0 miles) from the finish. Three days later, she secured her third straight Flèche Wallonne win after powering away on the Mur de Huy, before emerging triumphant at the first ever Liège–Bastogne–Liège the following Sunday. Her dominance in the climbers races earned her the nickname Queen of the Ardennes. Three weeks later she won the Tour of California, after she surpassed Katie Hall during the last stage thanks to bonus seconds won at an intermediate sprint.

In the summer, she won the Giro Rosa for the second time. Her Boels–Dolmans team had won the opening Team time trial, and van der Breggen moved into the race lead after placing second in stage 2. She won the final general classification with more than a minute over Elisa Longo Borghini and Annemiek van Vleuten. After Tom Dumoulin's win in the men's Giro d'Italia held in May, it was the first time a Grand Tour was won by both a Dutch man and woman in the same year.

Later, van der Breggen won a stage and was second overall in the Holland Ladies Tour, which secured her lead in the final standing of the UCI Women's World Tour ahead of van Vleuten. At the Road World Championships in Norway her Boels–Dolmans team finished second to Team Sunweb in the team time trial event. She also placed second in the individual time trial behind van Vleuten, and eighth in the road race.

=== 2018: Queen of the Classics and first rainbow jersey ===
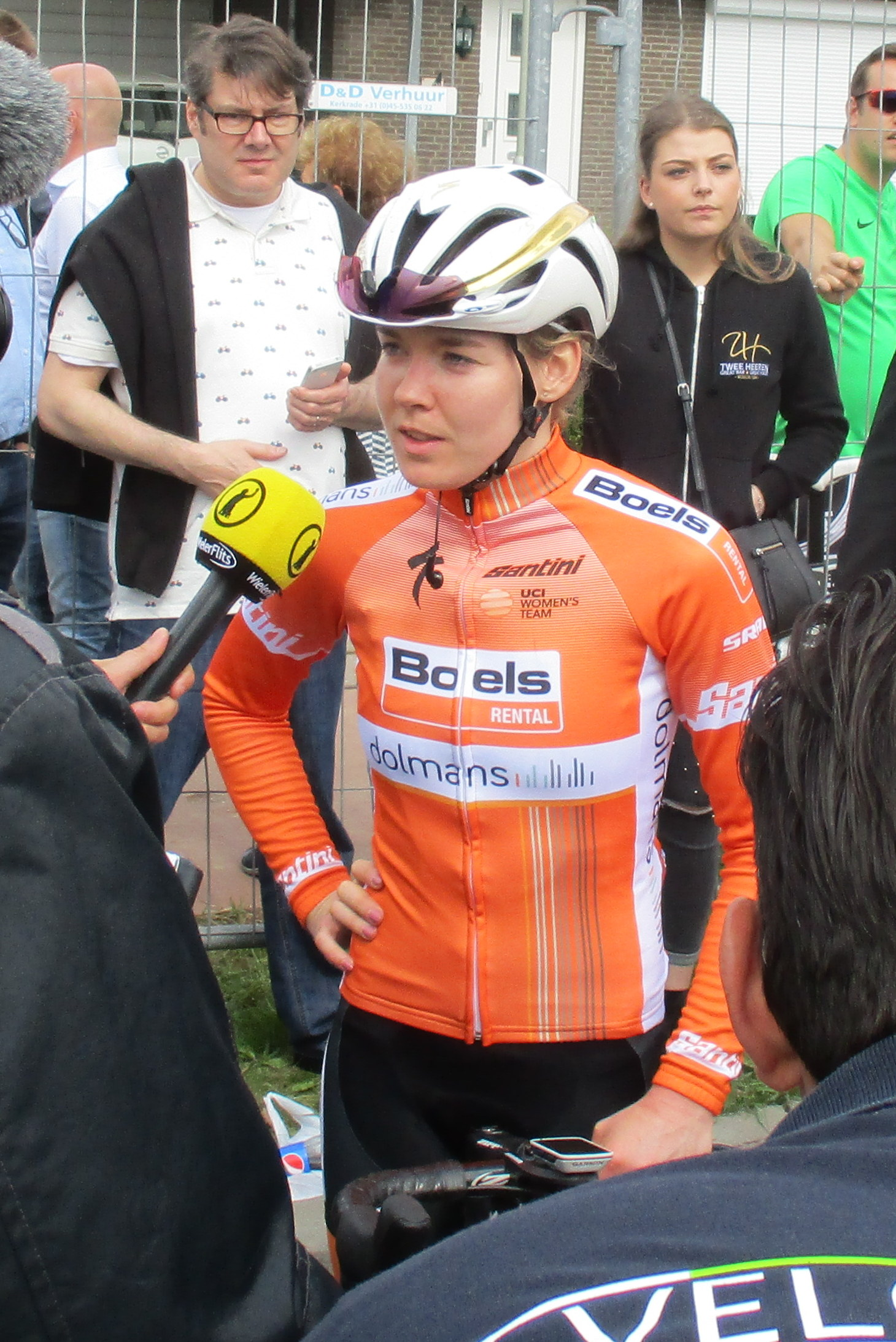
Van der Breggen (pictured at the Amstel Gold Race) won four World Tour races in the spring of 2018.

As world number one, she kicked off the 2018 season at the Strade Bianche. She won the race, in abysmal weather, after an attack on the penultimate gravel sector of Colle Pinzuto at 17 kilometres (11 miles) from the finish. Three weeks later she won the Tour of Flanders after a 27-kilometre (17-mile) solo breakaway. Van der Breggen made her decisive move on the Kruisberg and increased her lead over the Oude Kwaremont and Paterberg to claim her first Tour of Flanders win.

The following week she won the opening time trial and finished fourth overall in the Healthy Ageing Tour, before attempting to defend her titles in the Ardennes classics. She finished 38th in the Amstel Gold Race after an early crash, but won her fourth consecutive Flèche Wallonne three days later, on her 28th birthday. She concluded the Ardennes week with her second win in Liège–Bastogne–Liège, after she powered away from Amanda Spratt on the uphill drag to the finish line.

Following the spring classics, van der Breggen was unable to mount a defence of her title at the Tour of California and rode at the Emakumeen Euskal Bira instead: the two races clashed on the calendar, Boels–Dolmans did not have enough riders or staff to send squads to both, and chose to enter the European race. Van der Breggen also elected not to defend her Giro Rosa title in 2018, choosing instead to focus on preparing for a bid to win her first title at the Road World Championships. She did compete in La Course in July, held on a mountainous parcours: van der Breggen attacked in the final kilometre of a climb up the Col de la Colombière and led over the top, being pursued on the 14 km descent by van Vleuten. However, van der Breggen ran out of steam on the rise to the finish line in Le Grand-Bornand, and was overhauled by van Vleuten in the last 100 metres of the race. The following month she raced at the European Road Championships, where she was narrowly defeated in the time trial by countrywoman Ellen van Dijk, securing a one-two for the Netherlands.

At the Worlds in Innsbruck in September, she started her campaign by taking a silver alongside her Boels–Dolmans team-mates in the women's team time trial. She took a second silver in the individual time trial, where she was denied the rainbow jersey by her compatriot van Vleuten and formed part of a Dutch clean sweep of the podium places ahead of the third placed van Dijk. She finally won her first Worlds gold in the road race, bridging over from a chase group to a group of five at the head of the race on the penultimate climb, before launching a solo attack with 39 km to go and crossing the finishing line alone with a lead of over three and a half minutes over runner-up Amanda Spratt.

=== 2019: Success on- and off-road ===
Van der Breggen started her 2019 season relatively quietly, making her first two road appearances in the spring at Omloop Het Nieuwsblad and Strade Bianche: in the latter race she worked as a domestique for team-mate Annika Langvad, who finished in second. Having made some appearances in mountain bike racing the previous year, in March she entered the Cape Epic mountain bike stage race alongside Langvad: the duo won the race by over half an hour. She subsequently announced that she would not defend her Tour of Flanders title so she could recover from her exertions at the Cape Epic, focusing instead on the Health Ageing Tour and the Ardennes Classics later in April. She went on to win her fifth consecutive Flèche Wallonne attacking with 200 m to the finish line on the Mur de Huy to match Marianne Vos' record for wins at the race and securing her first road win since the 2018 Worlds. In May she won the overall at the Tour of California, as well as taking the opening stage after attacking on the final climb of the day to cross the finishing line alone.

Later in the year, van der Breggen won the GP de Plouay – Bretagne with a solo attack 10 kilometres (6.2 miles) from the finishing line. At the Road World Championships in Yorkshire, she took two silver medals: in the individual time trial she finished behind champion Chloé Dygert and ahead of van Vleuten, whilst in the road race she acted as a marker in a chase group attempting to reel in her team-mate van Vleuten, who made an ultimately successful long-range solo attack with 104 kilometres (65 miles) to go. Van der Breggen attacked fellow chaser Amanda Spratt in the closing kilometres of the course to secure the silver.

=== 2020: Third Giro win and Worlds double ===
In 2020, van der Breggen enjoyed some early season success at the Setmana Ciclista Valenciana in February: she won the race's second stage with a solo attack on the final climb, the 8.3-kilometre (5.2-mile)-long Alto de Tudons, taking the overall race lead in the process, which she held on the remaining two stages of the race. In May she announced that she would retire from competition at the end of 2021 after the postponed 2020 Summer Olympics, which were scheduled to be held in the summer of 2021 due to the COVID-19 pandemic.

Upon the resumption of racing in July, she finished third in the Emakumeen Nafarroako Klasikoa and second in Durango-Durango Emakumeen Saria before placing fourth at Strade Bianche. In August she won the Dutch National Road Race Championships for the first time in her career: before the halfway point of the race she and Anouska Koster bridged across to van der Breggen's team-mate Jip van den Bos, who had earlier broken away from the peloton. Van der Breggen eventually dropped the other two riders at the front, whilst they were being chased by another three rider group of van Vleuten, Vos and Amy Pieters, which similarly disintegrated when van Vleuten dropped the other two riders. Van der Breggen crossed the finish line over a minute ahead of van Vlueten in second. Shortly afterwards she took the gold medal in the individual time trial at the European Road Championships in Plouay, finishing 30 seconds ahead of van Dijk.

The following month van der Breggen won the Giro Rosa, becoming the fourth woman to win three editions of the race. She went into the lead on the penultimate eighth stage, where she was pipped to the stage win by Elisa Longo Borghini after the pair went clear of the rest of the leading group on the final climb, taking the pink jersey from Katarzyna Niewiadoma, who in turn had inherited it after previous leader van Vleuten crashed out of the race on the previous day. Later that month, at the UCI Road World Championships in Imola, van der Breggen was crowned world time trial champion for the first time, having previously taken four silver medals in the event: she finished ahead of Marlen Reusser and van Dijk after reigning champion Dygert crashed out of the race. She went on to win a second road race world title, following and overhauling an acceleration by van Vleuten with an attack over the top of the penultimate climb of the Cima Gallisterna with 40 kilometres (25 miles) to the finish, and taking victory with a margin of 1 minute 40 seconds over silver and bronze medallists van Vleuten and Longo Borghini. In doing so she became only the second rider in history to win world titles in the time trial and the road race in the same year, after Jeannie Longo in 1995. Shortly after the Worlds, van der Breggen set a new record for wins at Flèche Wallonne when she won the race for a sixth time, moving one clear of Vos, outclimbing Cecilie Uttrup Ludwig and Demi Vollering up the final ascent of the Mur de Huy to clinch victory.

=== 2021: Fourth Giro win, retirement ===
In 2021, van der Breggen won her fourth Giro Donne, as well as other races including La Flèche Wallonne Féminine (for a record seventh time), the Vuelta a Burgos Feminas, and Omloop Het Nieuwsblad. She also won the Dutch National Time Trial Championships for the second time. At the Tokyo 2020 Olympics, she won a bronze medal in the time trial competition, before retiring from professional competition.

=== Directeur sportif role ===
Following her retirement, van der Breggen worked as a directeur sportif for her final professional team, UCI Women's WorldTeam SD Worx.

=== Return to professional competition ===
In June 2024, van der Breggen announced that she would be returning to the professional peloton for the 2025 season with her former team, Team SD Worx–Protime.

In June 2026, van der Breggen won stage 4 of the Giro d'Italia Women, which was an mountain individual time trial, by 1 minute and 4 seconds. This win gave her the lead in the race and the maglia rosa, as well as being her first stage win in the Giro d'Italia Women since 2021.

== Personal life ==
Van der Breggen lives in Hasselt, in the northeast of the Netherlands, She married in 2018 Sierk Jan de Haan, who is a coach for UCI WorldTeam Visma–Lease a Bike, but the couple divorced in 2021. She comes from a religious family and is a member of the Reformed Churches in the Netherlands (Liberated). She is a trained nurse, having graduated from nursing school in 2012. Apart from cycling, she plays the piano and enjoys painting and knitting.

== Major results ==
2007
5th Road race, UCI Juniors World Championships
2008
6th Road race, UEC European Junior Road Championships
10th Parel van de Veluwe
2010
5th Gouden Pijl
2012 (5 pro wins)
1st Time trial, UEC European Under-23 Road Championships
1st Overall Tour de Bretagne

1st Points classification
1st Young rider classification
1st Stages 1, 2 (ITT) & 4

1st Duo Normand
2nd Overall Trophée d'Or Féminin

1st Stage 2 (TTT)

2nd Omloop van de IJsseldelta
4th GP de Plouay
5th Road race, UCI Road World Championships
5th Time trial, National Road Championships
5th Overall Ster Zeeuwsche Eilanden
5th Overall Tour Féminin en Limousin

1st Young rider classification
1st Stage 2 (ITT)

6th GP Comune di Cornaredo
6th Ronde van Luyksgestel
7th Overall Holland Ladies Tour
9th Tour of Flanders
2013
1st Omloop van de IJsseldelta
2nd Overall Trophée d'Or Féminin
2nd Ronde van Zuid Oost-Friesland
2nd RaboRonde Heerlen
3rd GP de Plouay
4th Road race, UCI Road World Championships
4th Overall Emakumeen Euskal Bira
4th Overall Thüringen Rundfahrt der Frauen
Open de Suède Vårgårda

4th Team time trial
5th Road race

4th La Flèche Wallonne
4th Holland Hills Classic
4th Profwielerronde Etten-Leur
4th Berkelse Wielerdag
5th Overall Grand Prix Elsy Jacobs
5th Overall Tour Languedoc Roussillon
6th Le Samyn
7th Overall Holland Ladies Tour
7th Tour of Flanders
8th Omloop Het Nieuwsblad
9th Trofeo Alfredo Binda
10th Overall Energiewacht Tour
2014 (6)
1st Overall Tour of Norway

1st Points classification
1st Stage 1

1st Overall Festival Luxembourgeois du cyclisme féminin Elsy Jacobs

1st Stage 1

1st Dwars door de Westhoek
2nd Overall Belgium Tour

1st Mountains classification
1st Stages 2 (TTT) & 4

2nd Ronde van Drenthe
2nd Open de Suède Vårgårda TTT
3rd Overall Emakumeen Euskal Bira

1st Mountains classification

3rd Overall Giro Rosa
4th Trofeo Alfredo Binda
4th Durango-Durango Emakumeen Saria
5th GP de Plouay
6th Tour of Flanders
7th Holland Hills Classic
10th Ronde van Gelderland
2015 (11)
1st Time trial, National Road Championships
1st Overall Giro Rosa

1st Stage 8 (ITT)

1st Overall Festival Luxembourgeois du cyclisme féminin Elsy Jacobs

1st Prologue

1st La Flèche Wallonne
1st Omloop Het Nieuwsblad
1st La Course by Le Tour de France
1st Open de Suède Vårgårda TTT
2nd Overall UCI Women's Road World Cup
2nd UCI Road World Championships – Women's road race
2nd UCI Road World Championships – Women's time trial
2nd Le Samyn
3rd UCI Road World Championships – Women's team time trial
3rd Road race, European Games
3rd Overall Belgium Tour

1st Mountains classification
1st Stage 4

3rd Trofeo Alfredo Binda
3rd Tour of Flanders
3rd Time trial, EPZ Omloop van Borsele
5th Overall Tour of Norway
5th Strade Bianche
5th Crescent Women World Cup Vårgårda
6th GP de Plouay
7th Overall Energiewacht Tour

1st Combativity classification
1st Prologue & Stage 4

7th Durango-Durango Emakumeen Saria
8th Overall Emakumeen Euskal Bira
2016 (4)
Olympic Games

1st Road race
3rd Time trial

UEC European Road Championships

1st Road race
2nd Time trial

1st Omloop van de IJsseldelta
1st La Flèche Wallonne
3rd Overall Giro Rosa
3rd Overall Festival Luxembourgeois du cyclisme féminin Elsy Jacobs
3rd Crescent Vårgårda UCI Women's WorldTour TTT
4th Ronde van Drenthe
5th Strade Bianche
5th Giro dell'Emilia Internazionale Donne Elite
6th Trofeo Alfredo Binda
7th Overall Holland Ladies Tour
2017 (6)
1st Overall UCI Women's World Tour
1st Overall Giro Rosa

1st Stage 1 (TTT)

1st Overall Tour of California
1st Amstel Gold Race
1st La Flèche Wallonne
1st Liège–Bastogne–Liège
1st Crescent Vårgårda UCI Women's WorldTour TTT
2nd UCI Road World Championships – Women's time trial
2nd UCI Road World Championships – Women's team time trial
2nd Overall Holland Ladies Tour

1st Stage 5

2nd Overall Healthy Ageing Tour

1st Stage 2 (TTT)

3rd Time trial, UEC European Road Championships
3rd Time trial, National Road Championships
8th UCI Road World Championships – Women's road race
2018 (7)
1st Road race
1st Overall Cyprus Sunshine Cup

1st Stage 2

1st Strade Bianche
1st Tour of Flanders
1st La Flèche Wallonne
1st Liège–Bastogne–Liège
1st Durango-Durango Emakumeen Saria
UEC European Road Championships

2nd Time trial
8th Road race

2nd UCI Road World Championships – Women's time trial
2nd UCI Road World Championships – Women's team time trial
2nd Time trial, National Road Championships
2nd La Course by Le Tour de France
2nd Postnord UCI WWT Vårgårda WestSweden TTT
3rd Overall Emakumeen Euskal Bira

1st Points classification

3rd Overall Holland Ladies Tour
4th Overall Healthy Ageing Tour

1st Stages 1 (ITT) & 3b (TTT)

2019 (5)
1st Overall Tour of California

1st Sprints classification
1st Stage 1

1st Overall Cape Epic (with Annika Langvad)
1st La Flèche Wallonne
1st GP de Plouay
2nd UCI Road World Championships – Women's time trial
2nd UCI Road World Championships – Women's time trial
2nd Overall Giro Rosa

1st Stage 9

3rd Time trial, National Road Championships
9th Overall Holland Ladies Tour
9th Strade Bianche
10th La Course by Le Tour de France
2020 (8)
1st UCI Road World Championships – Women's road race
1st UCI Road World Championships – Women's time trial
1st Time trial, UEC European Road Championships
1st Road race, National Road Championships
1st Overall Giro Rosa
1st Overall Setmana Ciclista Valenciana

1st Stage 2

1st La Flèche Wallonne
2nd Durango-Durango Emakumeen Saria
3rd Emakumeen Nafarroako Klasikoa
4th Strade Bianche
2021 (10)
1st Time trial, National Road Championships
1st Overall Giro Rosa

1st Points classification
1st Stages 2 & 4 (ITT)

1st Overall Vuelta a Burgos

1st Points classification
1st Mountains classification
1st Stage 4

1st La Flèche Wallonne
1st Omloop Het Nieuwsblad
1st Gran Premio Ciudad de Eibar
1st Durango-Durango Emakumeen Saria
3rd Time trial, Olympic Games
3rd Strade Bianche
4th La Course by Le Tour de France
5th Liège–Bastogne–Liège
8th Tour of Flanders
2025 (1)
1st Stage 4 La Vuelta Femenina
2nd UCI Road World Championships – Women's time trial
2nd Strade Bianche
3rd Overall Setmana Ciclista Valenciana
7th Omloop van het Hageland
Combativity award Stage 9 Tour de France
2026
2nd Overall La Vuelta Femenina

1st Stage 6

2nd Trofeo Alfredo Binda
4th Liège–Bastogne–Liège
5th La Flèche Wallonne
9th Amstel Gold Race
3rd Overall Giro d'Italia Women

1st Stage 4

=== General classification results timeline ===
Major Tour results timeline
Major tour	2009	2010	2011	2012	2013	2014	2015	2016	2017	2018	2019	2020	2021	2025	2026
La Vuelta Femenina (Note: Known as the Challenge by La Vuelta from 2020 to 2022)	Race did not exist						—	—	—	—	—	—	58	3	2
Giro d'Italia Femminile	DNF	43	89	22	18	3	1	3	1	—	2	1	1	6	3
Tour de France Femmes	Race did not exist													11	DNF
Stage race results timeline
Stage race	2009	2010	2011	2012	2013	2014	2015	2016	2017	2018	2019	2020	2021	2025	2026
UAE Tour Women	Race did not exist													—	DNF
Grand Prix Elsy Jacobs	38	—	—	20	5	1	1	3	—	—	—	NH	—	—	—
Tour of California	Race did not exist						—	—	1	—	1	NH	Not Held		
Emakumeen Euskal Bira	—	40	—	—	4	3	8	—	—	3	—	NH	Not Held		
The Women's Tour	Race did not exist					—	—	DNF	12	—	—	NH	—	—	
Thüringen Rundfahrt	49	—	—	—	4	—	—	—	—	—	—	NH	—	Not Held	
Belgium Tour	Race did not exist				—	2	3	—	—	—	—	NH	—	Not Held	
Tour of Norway	Race did not exist					1	5	—	—	—	—	NH	—	Not Held	
Holland Ladies Tour	—	—	—	7	7	—	—	7	2	3	9	NH	—	—	
Vuelta a Burgos	Race did not exist						—	—	—	—	—	NH	1	—	—

=== Classics results timeline ===
Monument	2009	2010	2011	2012	2013	2014	2015	2016	2017	2018	2019	2020	2021	2025	2026
Tour of Flanders	—	—	—	9	7	6	3	24	15	1	—	11	8	11	—
Paris–Roubaix	Race did not exist											NH	—	—	—
Liège–Bastogne–Liège	Race did not exist								1	1	12	26	5	11	4
Classic	2009	2010	2011	2012	2013	2014	2015	2016	2017	2018	2019	2020	2021	2025	2026
Ronde van Drenthe	—	DNF	—	49	11	2	22	4	15	21	—	NH	—	NH	
Omloop Het Nieuwsblad	31	—	—	—	8	16	1	14	—	—	11	—	1	—	17
Strade Bianche	Race did not exist						5	5	—	1	9	4	3	2	18
Trofeo Alfredo Binda	—	—	—	21	9	4	3	6	DNF	—	—	NH	—	31	2
Gent–Wevelgem	Race did not exist			—	—	—	—	—	43	—	—	—	—	—	—
Amstel Gold Race	Race did not exist								1	38	13	NH	53	DNF	9
La Flèche Wallonne	67	—	—	12	4	12	1	1	1	1	1	1	1	—	5
Classic Lorient Agglomération	—	—	60	4	3	5	6	—	19	—	1	DNF	DNF	56	
Open de Suède Vårgårda	—	—	62	—	5	12	5	54	19	43	41	Not held			

=== Major championships results timeline ===
Event		2010	2011	2012	2013	2014	2015	2016	2017	2018	2019	2020	2021	2025
Olympic Games	Time trial	Not held		—	Not held			3	Not held				3	NH
Olympic Games	Road race	Not held		—	Not held			1	Not held				15	NH
World Championships	Time trial	—	—	11	—	—	2	13	2	2	2	1	—	2
World Championships	Road race	—	—	5	4	—	2	87	8	1	2	1	89	38
World Championships	Team time trial	Not held		—	9	14	3	8	2	2	Not held			
European Championships	Time trial	Event did not exist						2	3	2	—	1	—	3
European Championships	Road race	Event did not exist						1	69	8	—	21	—	—
European Games	Time trial	Event did not exist					—	Not held			—	Not held		
European Games	Road race	Event did not exist					3	Not held			55	Not held		
National Championships	Time trial	—	—	5	—	5	1	—	3	2	3	NH	1	—
National Championships	Road race	22	66	7	DNF	42	21	58	8	8	12	1	40	—

Legend
—	Did not compete
DNF	Did not finish
NH	Not held

== See also ==
- UCI Women's Road World Cup
- UCI Women's World Tour
- List of women's road bicycle races
