= 2021 La Flèche Wallonne Femmes =

Cycling race

2021 UCI Women's World Tour, race 7 of 18
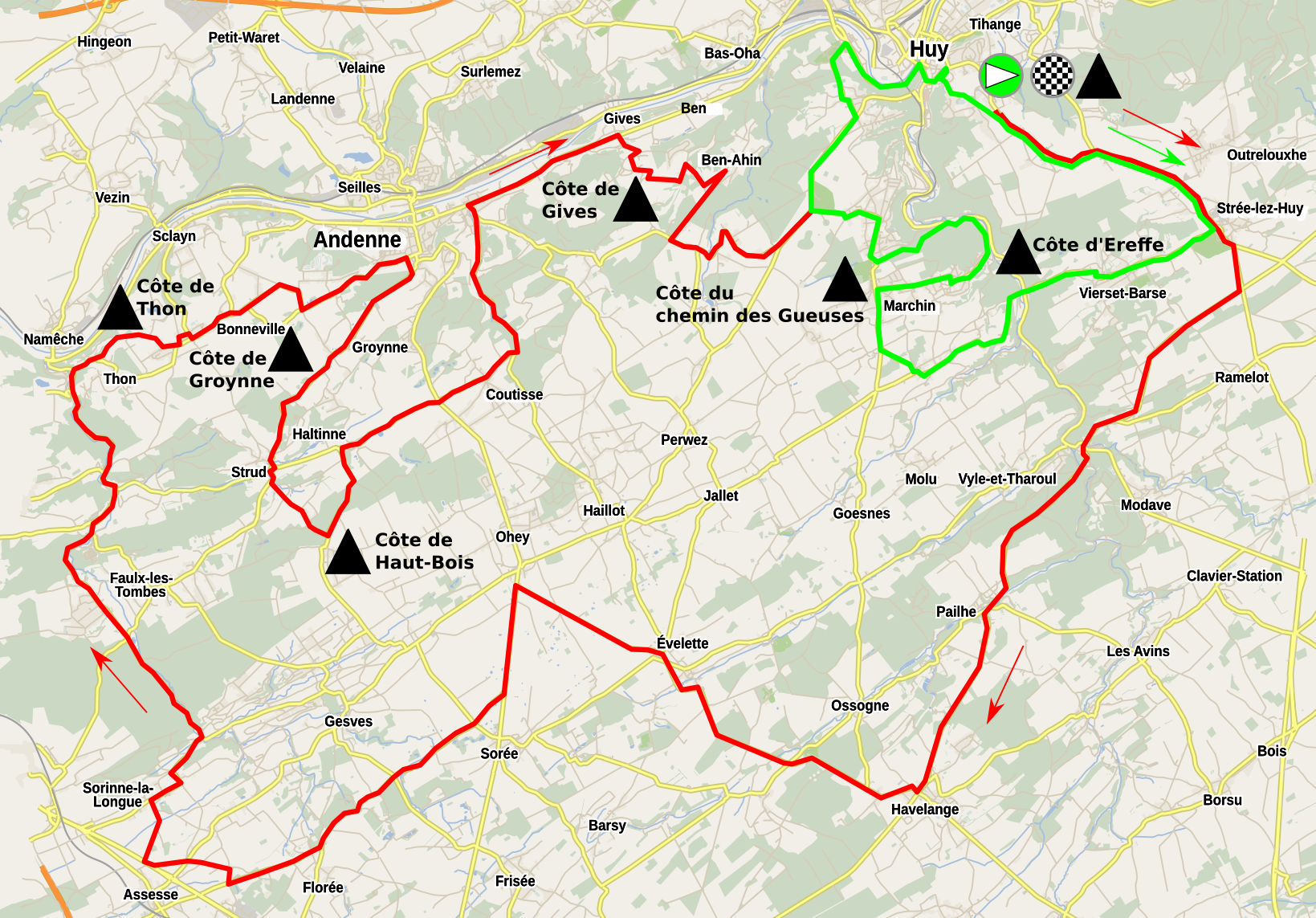

Race details
- Dates: 21 April 2021
- Stages: 1
- Distance: 130.2 km (80.9 mi)
- Winning time: 3h 28' 27"

Results
	Winner	Anna van der Breggen (NED)	(SD Worx)
	Second	Katarzyna Niewiadoma (POL)	(Canyon//SRAM)
	Third	Elisa Longo Borghini (ITA)	(Trek–Segafredo)

The 24th running of the La Flèche Wallonne Femmes started and finished in Huy. The route featured eight categorized climbs, including two ascents of the Mur de Huy. The finish line was on the top of the final ascent of the Mur. Anna van der Breggen won the race for the seventh consecutive time.

== Route ==
The women's race started and finished in Huy, and covered the same final 90km as the men's race, totalling 130.2 km.

There were 8 categorised climbs:

- 54.2 km: Côte de Thon – 1.1 km climb at 6.9%
- 63.3 km: Côte de Groynne – 2.1 km climb at 5%
- 68.8 km: Côte de Haute-Bois – 1.1 km climb at 7.9%
- 83.2 km: Côte de Gives – 1.4 km climb at 7.7%
- 98.5 km: Mur de Huy – 1.3 km climb at 9.6%
- 111.1 km: Côte d'Ereffe – 2.1 km climb at 5%
- 120.6 km: Côte du Chemin des Geuses – 1.8 km climb at 6.5%
- 130.2 km: Mur de Huy – 1.3 km climb at 9.6%

== Teams ==
Nine UCI Women's WorldTeams and fifteen UCI Women's Continental Teams competed.

UCI Women's WorldTeams

- Alé BTC Ljubljana
- Canyon//SRAM
- FDJ Nouvelle-Aquitaine Futuroscope
- Liv Racing
- Movistar Team
- SD Worx
- Team BikeExchange
- Team DSM
- Trek–Segafredo

UCI Women's Continental Teams

- A.R. Monex
- Andy Schleck–CP NVST–Immo Losch
- Arkéa Pro Cycling Team
- Bepink
- Bingoal Casino–Chevalmeire
- Ceratizit–WNT Pro Cycling
- Cogeas–Mettler–Look
- Doltcini–Van Eyck–Proximus
- Drops–Le Col
- Team Jumbo–Visma
- Lotto–Soudal Ladies
- Parkhotel Valkenburg
- Rally Cycling
- Tibco–Silicon Valley Bank
- Valcar–Travel & Service

== Results ==
Result
Rank	Rider	Team	Time
1	Anna van der Breggen (NED)	SD Worx	3h 28' 27"
2	Katarzyna Niewiadoma (POL)	Canyon//SRAM	+ 2"
3	Elisa Longo Borghini (ITA)	Trek–Segafredo	+ 6"
4	Annemiek van Vleuten (NED)	Movistar Team	+ 6"
5	Mavi García (ESP)	Alé BTC Ljubljana	+ 22"
6	Juliette Labous (FRA)	Team DSM	+ 28"
7	Ruth Winder (USA)	Trek–Segafredo	+ 31"
8	Cecilie Uttrup Ludwig (DEN)	FDJ Nouvelle-Aquitaine Futuroscope	+ 32"
9	Amanda Spratt (AUS)	Team BikeExchange	+ 35"
10	Demi Vollering (NED)	SD Worx	+ 42"

== See also ==
- 2021 in women's road cycling
