= 2015 La Flèche Wallonne Féminine =

2015 UCI Women's Road World Cup, race 4 of 10
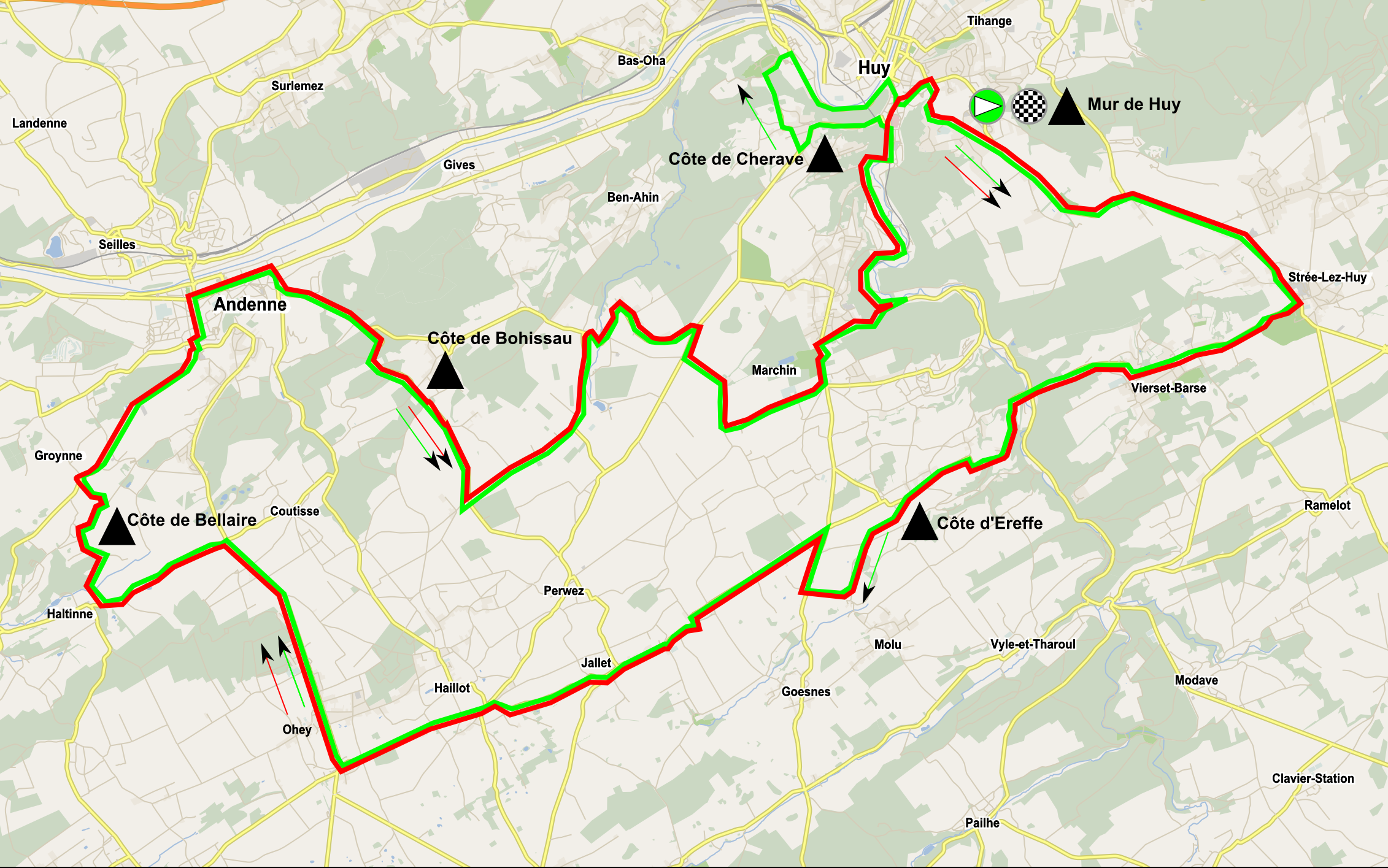

Race details
- Dates: 22 April 2015
- Distance: 121 km (75 mi)
- Winning time: 3h 18' 46"

Results
	Winner	Anna van der Breggen (NED)	(Rabobank-Liv Woman Cycling Team)
	Second	Annemiek van Vleuten (NED)	(Bigla Pro Cycling Team)
	Third	Megan Guarnier (USA)	(Boels–Dolmans)

The 2015 La Flèche Wallonne Féminine was the 18th edition of the La Flèche Wallonne Féminine one-day women's road bicycle race held in Belgium, starting and ending in the town of Huy. The race included two climbs of the Mur de Huy; the finish line was at the top of the second of these ascents.

The race was won by Anna van der Breggen (Rabobank-Liv Woman Cycling Team). Van der Breggen attacked at the bottom of the Mur and took a solo victory, 12 seconds ahead of Annemiek van Vleuten (Bigla Pro Cycling Team), with Megan Guarnier (Boels–Dolmans) a further 8 seconds back in third. Van der Breggen moved into the lead of the 2015 UCI Women's Road World Cup following the race.

== Results ==
=== Race results ===
Result
Rank	Rider	Team	Time
1	Anna van der Breggen (NED)	Rabobank-Liv Woman Cycling Team	3h 18' 46"
2	Annemiek van Vleuten (NED)	Bigla Pro Cycling Team	+ 12"
3	Megan Guarnier (USA)	Boels–Dolmans	+ 20"
4	Ashleigh Moolman (RSA)	Bigla Pro Cycling Team	+ 32"
5	Katarzyna Niewiadoma (POL)	Rabobank-Liv Woman Cycling Team	+ 40"
6	Evelyn Stevens (USA)	Boels–Dolmans	+ 44"
7	Roxane Knetemann (NED)	Rabobank-Liv Woman Cycling Team	+ 46"
8	Pauline Ferrand-Prévot (FRA)	Rabobank-Liv Woman Cycling Team	+ 57"
9	Alena Amialiusik (BLR)	Velocio–SRAM	+ 1' 07"
10	Emma Johansson (SWE)	Orica–AIS	+ 1' 07"

=== World Cup standings ===
Individual ranking after 4 of 10 World Cup races
Rank	Rider	Team	Points
1	Anna van der Breggen (NED)	Rabobank-Liv Woman Cycling Team	290
2	Annemiek van Vleuten (NED)	Bigla Pro Cycling Team	226
3	Jolien D'Hoore (BEL)	Wiggle–Honda	220
4	Elisa Longo Borghini (ITA)	Wiggle–Honda	196
5	Lizzie Armitstead (GBR)	Boels–Dolmans	195
6	Pauline Ferrand-Prévot (FRA)	Rabobank-Liv Woman Cycling Team	175
7	Alena Amialiusik (BLR)	Velocio–SRAM	140
8	Elena Cecchini (ITA)	Lotto–Soudal Ladies	122
9	Ellen van Dijk (NED)	Boels–Dolmans	120
10	Ashleigh Moolman (RSA)	Bigla Pro Cycling Team	120
