= 2015 Festival Luxembourgeois du cyclisme féminin Elsy Jacobs =

Race details
- Dates: 1–3 May
- Stages: 3
- Distance: 212.9 km (132.3 mi)
- Winning time: 5h 21' 29"

Results
Jersey awarded to the overall winner	Winner	Anna van der Breggen (NED)	(Rabobank-Liv Woman Cycling Team)
	Second	Annemiek van Vleuten (NED)	(Bigla Pro Cycling Team)
	Third	Lucinda Brand (NED)	(Rabobank-Liv Woman Cycling Team)
Jersey awarded to the points classification winner	Points	Floortje Mackaij (NED)	(Team Liv–Plantur)
Jersey awarded to the mountains classification winner	Mountains	Floortje Mackaij (NED)	(Team Liv–Plantur)
Jersey awarded to the youth classification winner	Youth	Floortje Mackaij (NED)	(Team Liv–Plantur)
	Team	Rabobank-Liv Woman Cycling Team	

The 2015 Festival Luxembourgeois du cyclisme féminin Elsy Jacobs was the eighth edition of the Festival Luxembourgeois du cyclisme féminin Elsy Jacobs, a women's road racing event in Luxembourg. It was a stage race with a UCI rating of 2.1. It was won by Anna van der Breggen (Rabobank-Liv Woman Cycling Team), beating Annemiek van Vleuten (Bigla Pro Cycling Team) and Lucinda Brand (Rabobank-Liv Woman Cycling Team).

== Stages ==
=== Prologue ===
1 May 2015 – Garnich to Garnich, 5.6 km (3.5 mi), individual time trial (ITT)

Prologue result and General classification after Prologue
Rank	Rider	Team	Time
1	Anna van der Breggen (NED)	Rabobank-Liv Woman Cycling Team	8' 13"
2	Annemiek van Vleuten (NED)	Bigla Pro Cycling Team	+ 2"
3	Ann-Sophie Duyck (BEL)	Belgium (national team)	+ 9"
4	Lucinda Brand (NED)	Rabobank-Liv Woman Cycling Team	+ 11"
5	Pauline Ferrand-Prévot (FRA)	Rabobank-Liv Woman Cycling Team	+ 12"
6	Christine Majerus (LUX)	Boels–Dolmans	+ 13"
7	Ashleigh Moolman (RSA)	Bigla Pro Cycling Team	+ 13"
8	Katrin Garfoot (AUS)	Orica–AIS	+ 16"
9	Lizzie Williams (AUS)	Orica–AIS	+ 17"
10	Amy Pieters (NED)	Team Liv–Plantur	+ 18"

=== Stage 1 ===
2 May 2015 – Garnich to Garnich, 108.2 km (67.2 mi)

Stage 1 result
Rank	Rider	Team	Time
1	Elena Cecchini (ITA)	Lotto–Soudal Ladies	2h 41' 50"
2	Lucinda Brand (NED)	Rabobank-Liv Woman Cycling Team	+ 0"
3	Amanda Spratt (AUS)	Orica–AIS	+ 0"
4	Janneke Ensing (NED)	Parkhotel Valkenburg Continental Team	+ 0"
5	Annemiek van Vleuten (NED)	Bigla Pro Cycling Team	+ 2"
6	Amy Pieters (NED)	Team Liv–Plantur	+ 2"
7	Pauline Ferrand-Prévot (FRA)	Rabobank-Liv Woman Cycling Team	+ 2"
8	Christine Majerus (LUX)	Boels–Dolmans	+ 2"
9	Rasa Leleivytė (LTU)	Aromitalia Vaiano	+ 2"
10	Jermaine Post (NED)	Parkhotel Valkenburg Continental Team	+ 2"

General classification after Stage 1
Rank	Rider	Team	Time
1	Anna van der Breggen (NED)	Rabobank-Liv Woman Cycling Team	2h 50' 05"
2	Annemiek van Vleuten (NED)	Bigla Pro Cycling Team	+ 2"
3	Lucinda Brand (NED)	Rabobank-Liv Woman Cycling Team	+ 3"
4	Pauline Ferrand-Prévot (FRA)	Rabobank-Liv Woman Cycling Team	+ 12"
5	Christine Majerus (LUX)	Boels–Dolmans	+ 13"
6	Ashleigh Moolman (RSA)	Bigla Pro Cycling Team	+ 13"
7	Katrin Garfoot (AUS)	Orica–AIS	+ 16"
8	Lizzie Williams (AUS)	Orica–AIS	+ 17"
9	Amy Pieters (NED)	Team Liv–Plantur	+ 18"
10	Laura Trott (GBR)	Matrix Fitness Pro Cycling	+ 19"

=== Stage 2 ===
3 May 2015 – Mamer to Mamer, 99.1 km (61.6 mi)

Stage 2 result
Rank	Rider	Team	Time
1	Floortje Mackaij (NED)	Team Liv–Plantur	2h 31' 20"
2	Katrin Garfoot (AUS)	Orica–AIS	+ 2"
3	Katarzyna Niewiadoma (POL)	Rabobank-Liv Woman Cycling Team	+ 2"
4	Sara Mustonen-Lichan (SWE)	Team Liv–Plantur	+ 4"
5	Christine Majerus (LUX)	Boels–Dolmans	+ 4"
6	Annemiek van Vleuten (NED)	Bigla Pro Cycling Team	+ 4"
7	Pauline Ferrand-Prévot (FRA)	Rabobank-Liv Woman Cycling Team	+ 4"
8	Melissa Hoskins (AUS)	Orica–AIS	+ 4"
9	Lotte Kopecky (BEL)	Belgium (national team)	+ 4"
10	Sabrina Stultiens (NED)	Team Liv–Plantur	+ 4"

Final general classification
Rank	Rider	Team	Time
1	Anna van der Breggen (NED)	Rabobank-Liv Woman Cycling Team	5h 21' 29"
2	Annemiek van Vleuten (NED)	Bigla Pro Cycling Team	+ 2"
3	Lucinda Brand (NED)	Rabobank-Liv Woman Cycling Team	+ 3"
4	Katrin Garfoot (AUS)	Orica–AIS	+ 8"
5	Pauline Ferrand-Prévot (FRA)	Rabobank-Liv Woman Cycling Team	+ 12"
6	Christine Majerus (LUX)	Boels–Dolmans	+ 13"
7	Ashleigh Moolman (RSA)	Bigla Pro Cycling Team	+ 13"
8	Lizzie Williams (AUS)	Orica–AIS	+ 17"
9	Floortje Mackaij (NED)	Team Liv–Plantur	+ 18"
10	Amy Pieters (NED)	Team Liv–Plantur	+ 18"

== Classification leadership table ==
Stage	Winner	General classification	Points classification	Mountains classification	Young rider classification	Team classification
P	Anna van der Breggen	Anna van der Breggen	not awarded	not awarded	Elinor Barker	Rabobank-Liv Woman Cycling Team
1	Elena Cecchini	Anna van der Breggen	Elena Cecchini	Ashleigh Moolman	Elinor Barker	Rabobank-Liv Woman Cycling Team
2	Floortje Mackaij	Anna van der Breggen	Floortje Mackaij	Floortje Mackaij	Floortje Mackaij	Rabobank-Liv Woman Cycling Team
Final		Anna van der Breggen	Floortje Mackaij	Floortje Mackaij	Floortje Mackaij	Rabo–Liv
