= 2019 GP de Plouay – Bretagne =

2019 GP de Plouay–Bretagne
2019 UCI Women's World Tour, race 20 of 23

Race details
- Dates: 31 August 2019
- Stages: 1
- Distance: 128 km (80 mi)
- Winning time: 3h 21' 54"

Results
	Winner	Anna van der Breggen (NED)	(Boels–Dolmans)
	Second	Coryn Rivera (USA)	(Team Sunweb)
	Third	Amy Pieters (NED)	(Boels–Dolmans)

The 2019 GP de Plouay featured as the twentieth round of the 2019 UCI Women's World Tour and was held on 31 August 2019, in Plouay, France. The race was held one day before the men's Bretagne Classic.

== Teams ==
23 teams participated in the race. Each team had a maximum of six riders:

Professional women's teams

- Boels–Dolmans
- Canyon//SRAM
- Mitchelton–Scott
- Alé–Cipollini
- CCC - Liv
- Parkhotel Valkenburg
- Bigla Pro Cycling
- BTC City Ljubljana
- Rally UHC Cycling
- FDJ Nouvelle-Aquitaine Futuroscope
- Trek–Segafredo
- Health Mate–Cyclelive Team
- Bizkaia–Durango
- Tibco–Silicon Valley Bank
- Team Sunweb
- Valcar–Cylance
- Lotto–Soudal Ladies
- WNT–Rotor Pro Cycling
- Movistar Team
- WCC Team
- Charente-Maritime Women Cycling
- Thailand Women's Cycling Team
- Memorial–Santos

== Results ==
Final general classification

Rank	Rider	Team	Time
1	Anna van der Breggen (NED)	Boels–Dolmans	3h 21' 54"
2	Coryn Rivera (USA)	Team Sunweb	+ 11"
3	Amy Pieters (NED)	Boels–Dolmans	s.t.
4	Marta Cavalli (ITA)	Valcar–Cylance	s.t.
5	Demi Vollering (NED)	Parkhotel Valkenburg	s.t.
6	Stine Borgli (NOR)	FDJ Nouvelle-Aquitaine Futuroscope	s.t.
7	Sofie De Vuyst (BEL)	Parkhotel Valkenburg	s.t.
8	Flávia Oliveira (BRA)	Memorial–Santos	s.t.
9	Ruth Winder (USA)	Trek–Segafredo	s.t.
10	Elena Cecchini (ITA)	Canyon//SRAM	s.t.
