= 2014 Belgium Tour =

2014|Lotto–Belisol Belgium Tour
Race details
- Dates: 11–15 September 2014
- Stages: 4 + Prologue
- Distance: 341.1 km (211.9 mi)

Results
Jersey awarded to the overall winner	Winner	Annemiek van Vleuten (NED)	(Rabobank-Liv Woman Cycling Team)
	Second	Anna van der Breggen (NED)	(Rabobank-Liv Woman Cycling Team)
	Third	Thalita de Jong (NED)	(Rabobank-Liv Woman Cycling Team)
Jersey awarded to the mountains classification winner	Mountains	Anna van der Breggen (NED)	(Rabobank-Liv Woman Cycling Team)
Jersey awarded to the youth classification winner	Youth	Thalita de Jong (NED)	(Rabobank-Liv Woman Cycling Team)
Jersey awarded to the sprints classification winner	Sprints	Thalita de Jong (NED)	(Rabobank-Liv Woman Cycling Team)
	Team	Rabobank-Liv Woman Cycling Team	

The 2014 |Lotto–Belisol Belgium Tour is the third edition of the Lotto–Belisol Belgium Tour, previous called Lotto–Decca Tour, a women's cycle stage race in Belgium. The tour was held from 11 to 15 September 2014. The tour has an UCI rating of 2.2.

Ellen van Dijk, who won the two previous editions, did not compete in this edition because the race did not fit in her schedule.

== Stages ==
=== Prologue ===
11 September – Naast to Naast, 7.82 km (4.9 mi)

Prologue result & General classification

	Rider	Team	Time
1	Annemiek van Vleuten (NED)	Rabobank-Liv Woman Cycling Team	10' 08"
2	Lauren Stephens (USA)	Team TIBCO–To The Top	+ 26"
3	Marianne Vos (NED)	Rabobank-Liv Woman Cycling Team	+ 32"
4	Lauren Komanski (USA)	USA (National team)	+ 33"
5	Anna van der Breggen (NED)	Rabobank-Liv Woman Cycling Team	+ 35"
6	Thalita de Jong (NED)	Rabobank-Liv Woman Cycling Team	+ 36"
7	Emma Johansson (SWE)	Orica–AIS	+ 37"
8	Charlotte Becker (GER)	Wiggle High5	+ 12"
9	Joëlle Numainville (CAN)	Lotto–Intermarché Ladies	+ 41"
10	Mieke Kröger (GER)	Futurumshop.nl–Zannata	+ 46"

=== Stage 1 ===
12 September – Honelles to Honelles, 110.16 km (68.5 mi)

Stage 1 result

	Rider	Team	Time
1	Annemiek van Vleuten (NED)	Liv Racing TeqFind	2h 56' 45"
2	Anna van der Breggen (NED)	Liv Racing TeqFind	s.t.
3	Thalita de Jong (NED)	Liv Racing TeqFind	+ 6"
4	Tiffany Cromwell (AUS)	Australia (National team)	+ 6"
5	Lucy Garner (GBR)	Team Giant–Shimano	+ 6"
6	Marianne Vos (NED)	Liv Racing TeqFind	+ 6"
7	Emma Johansson (SWE)	Sweden (National team)	+ 6"
8	Joëlle Numainville (CAN)	Lotto–Intermarché Ladies	+ 6"
9	Kelly Druyts (BEL)	Topsport Vlaanderen–Pro-Duo	+ 6"
10	Lauren Stephens (USA)	Team TIBCO–To The Top	+ 6"

General classification after stage 1

	Rider	Team	Time
1	Annemiek van Vleuten (NED)	Liv Racing TeqFind	3h 06' 37"
2	Anna van der Breggen (NED)	Liv Racing TeqFind	+ 43"
3	Lauren Stephens (USA)	Team TIBCO–To The Top	+ 48"
4	Thalita de Jong (NED)	Liv Racing TeqFind	+ 50"
5	Marianne Vos (NED)	Liv Racing TeqFind	+ 51"
6	Lauren Komanski (USA)	USA (National team)	+ 55"
7	Emma Johansson (SWE)	Sweden (National team)	+ 59"
8	Charlotte Becker (GER)	Germany (National team)	+ 1' 03"
9	Joëlle Numainville (CAN)	Lotto–Intermarché Ladies	+ 1' 03"
10	Amy Pieters (NED)	Team Giant–Shimano	+ 1' 05"

=== Stage 2 ===
13 September – Colfontaine to Colfontaine, 20.1 km (12.5 mi) Team time trial (TTT)

Stage 2 result

	Team	Time
1	Liv Racing TeqFind	21' 15"
2	Team Giant–Shimano	+ 43"
3	Futurumshop.nl–Zannata	+ 43"
4	Team TIBCO–To The Top	+ 43"
5	Mixed team 4	+ 54"
6	Sweden (National team)	+ 57"
7	USA (National team)	+ 1' 11"
8	Germany (National team)	+ 1' 30"
9	Topsport Vlaanderen–Pro-Duo	+ 1' 31"
10	Lotto–Intermarché Ladies	+ 1' 32"

General classification after stage 2

	Rider	Team	Time
1	Annemiek van Vleuten (NED)	Liv Racing TeqFind	3h 27' 52"
2	Anna van der Breggen (NED)	Liv Racing TeqFind	+ 43"
3	Thalita de Jong (NED)	Liv Racing TeqFind	+ 48"
4	Marianne Vos (NED)	Liv Racing TeqFind	+ 50"
5	Lauren Stephens (USA)	Team TIBCO–To The Top	+ 51"
6	Amy Pieters (NED)	Team Giant–Shimano	+ 55"
7	Emma Johansson (SWE)	Sweden (National team)	+ 59"
8	Floortje Mackaij (NED)	Team Giant–Shimano	+ 1' 03"
9	Joanne Kiesanowski (NZL)	Team TIBCO–To The Top	+ 1' 03"
10	Sofie De Vuyst (BEL)	Futurumshop.nl–Zannata	+ 1' 05"

=== Stage 3 ===
14 September – Halle to Buizingen, 102.7 km (63.8 mi)

Stage 3 result

	Rider	Team	Time
1	Chloe Hosking (AUS)	Mixed team 4	2h 42' 57"
2	Thalita de Jong (NED)	Liv Racing TeqFind	s.t.
3	Kelly Druyts (BEL)	Topsport Vlaanderen–Pro-Duo	s.t.
4	Emma Johansson (SWE)	Sweden (National team)	s.t.
5	Lucy Garner (GBR)	Team Giant–Shimano	s.t.
6	Marianne Vos (NED)	Liv Racing TeqFind	s.t.
7	Kendall Ryan (USA)	USA (National team)	s.t.
8	Ashleigh Moolman (RSA)	Mixed team 4	s.t.
9	Joanne Kiesanowski (NZL)	Team TIBCO–To The Top	s.t.
10	Amy Pieters (NED)	Team Giant–Shimano	s.t.

General classification after stage 3

	Rider	Team	Time
1	Annemiek van Vleuten (NED)	Liv Racing TeqFind	6h 10' 49"
2	Thalita de Jong (NED)	Liv Racing TeqFind	+ 39"
3	Anna van der Breggen (NED)	Liv Racing TeqFind	+ 43"
4	Marianne Vos (NED)	Liv Racing TeqFind	+ 51"
5	Lauren Stephens (USA)	Team TIBCO–To The Top	+ 51"
6	Amy Pieters (NED)	Team Giant–Shimano	+ 1' 48"
7	Joanne Kiesanowski (NZL)	Team TIBCO–To The Top	+ 1' 51"
8	Floortje Mackaij (NED)	Team Giant–Shimano	+ 1' 56"
9	Emma Johansson (SWE)	Sweden (National team)	+ 1' 56"
10	Chloe Hosking (AUS)	Mixed team 4	+ 1' 58"

=== Stage 4 ===
15 September – Geraardsbergen to Geraardsbergen, 100.3 km (62.3 mi)

Stage 4 result

	Rider	Team	Time
1	Anna van der Breggen (NED)	Liv Racing TeqFind	2h 41' 48"
2	Emma Johansson (SWE)	Sweden (National team)	+ 7"
3	Kelly Druyts (BEL)	Topsport Vlaanderen–Pro-Duo	+ 7"
4	Annemiek van Vleuten (NED)	Liv Racing TeqFind	+ 7"
5	Kelly Druyts (BEL)	Topsport Vlaanderen–Pro-Duo	+ 7"
6	Amy Pieters (NED)	Team Giant–Shimano	+ 7"
7	Chloe Hosking (AUS)	Mixed team 4	+ 7"
8	Lauren Stephens (USA)	Team TIBCO–To The Top	+ 7"
9	Thalita de Jong (NED)	Liv Racing TeqFind	+ 7"
10	Joanne Kiesanowski (NZL)	Team TIBCO–To The Top	+ 7"

Final General classification

	Rider	Team	Time
1	Annemiek van Vleuten (NED)	Liv Racing TeqFind	8h 52' 40"
2	Anna van der Breggen (NED)	Liv Racing TeqFind	+ 27"
3	Thalita de Jong (NED)	Liv Racing TeqFind	+ 41"
4	Lauren Stephens (USA)	Team TIBCO–To The Top	+ 1' 35"
5	Amy Pieters (NED)	Team Giant–Shimano	+ 1' 52"
6	Emma Johansson (SWE)	Sweden (National team)	+ 1' 53"
7	Joanne Kiesanowski (NZL)	Team TIBCO–To The Top	+ 1' 55"
8	Chloe Hosking (AUS)	Mixed team 4	+ 2' 02"
9	Sofie De Vuyst (BEL)	Futurumshop.nl–Zannata	+ 2' 03"
10	Floortje Mackaij (NED)	Team Giant–Shimano	+ 2' 22"

== Classification leadership ==
Stage	Winner	General classification	Sprints classification	Mountains classification	Young rider classification	Belgian Riders	Combativity award	Team classification
P	Annemiek van Vleuten	Annemiek van Vleuten	Not awarded	Not awarded	Thalita de Jong	Annemiek van Vleuten	Not awarded	Liv Racing TeqFind
1	Annemiek van Vleuten	Annemiek van Vleuten	Annemiek van Vleuten	Anna van der Breggen	Thalita de Jong	Sofie De Vuyst	Stephanie Pohl	Liv Racing TeqFind
2 (TTT)	Liv Racing TeqFind	Annemiek van Vleuten	Annemiek van Vleuten	Anna van der Breggen	Thalita de Jong	Sofie De Vuyst	Not awarded	Liv Racing TeqFind
3	Chloe Hosking	Annemiek van Vleuten	Thalita de Jong	Anna van der Breggen	Thalita de Jong	Sofie De Vuyst	Tiffany Cromwell	Liv Racing TeqFind
4	Anna van der Breggen	Annemiek van Vleuten	Thalita de Jong	Anna van der Breggen	Thalita de Jong	Sofie De Vuyst	Not awarded	Liv Racing TeqFind
Final Classification		Annemiek van Vleuten	Thalita de Jong	Anna van der Breggen	Thalita de Jong	Sofie De Vuyst	Not awarded	Liv Racing TeqFind

== See also ==
- 2014 in women's road cycling
