= 2017 La Flèche Wallonne Féminine =

2017 UCI Women's World Tour, race 7 of 20
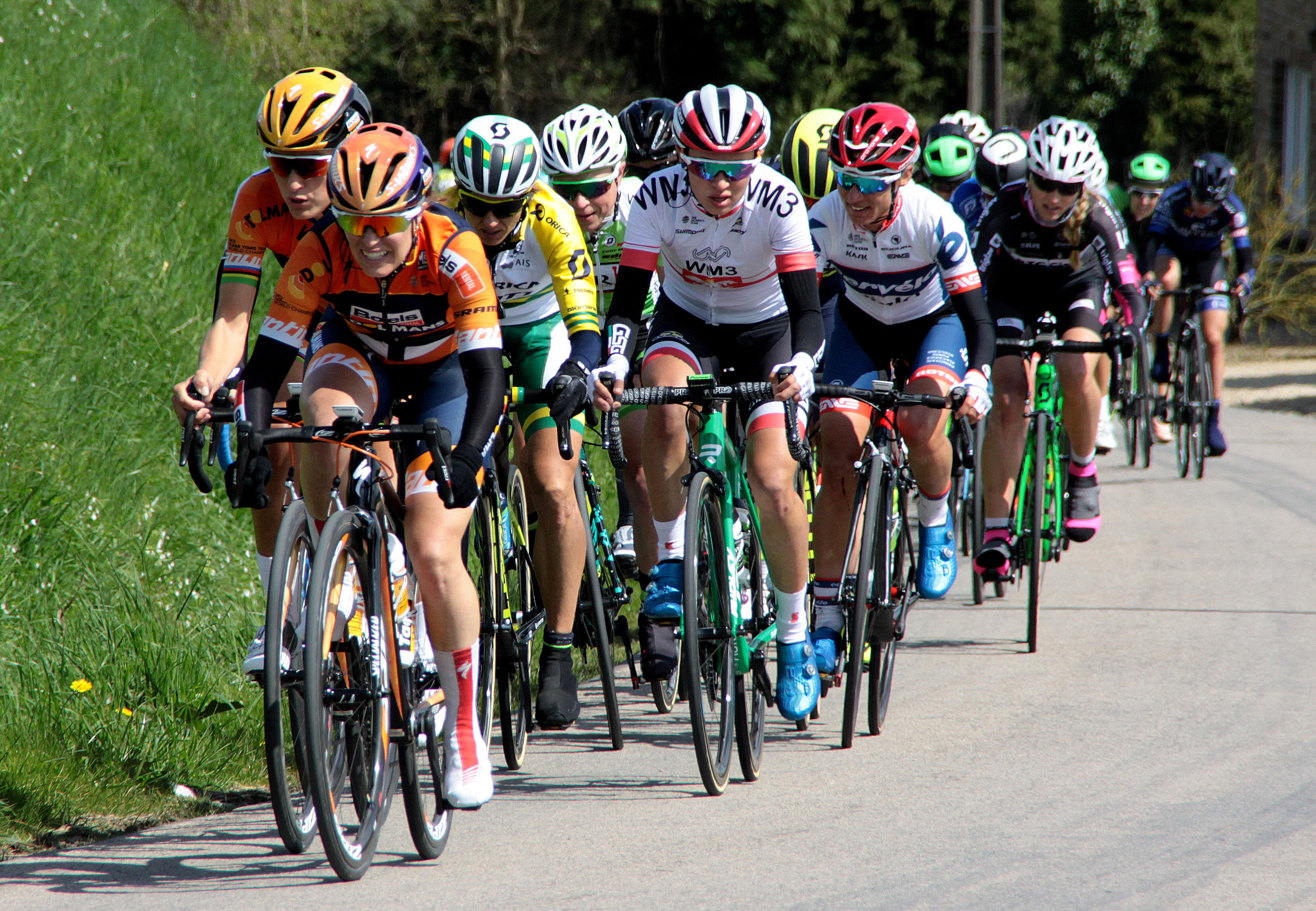
- Flèche wallonne féminine 2017

Race details
- Dates: 19 April 2017
- Stages: 1
- Distance: 120 km (75 mi)
- Winning time: 3h 21' 06"

Results
| | Winner | Anna van der Breggen (NED) | (Boels–Dolmans) |
| | Second | Lizzie Deignan (GBR) | (Boels–Dolmans) |
| | Third | Katarzyna Niewiadoma (POL) | (WM3 Energie) |

The 2017 La Flèche Wallonne Féminine was the 20th edition of the La Flèche Wallonne Féminine one-day women's road bicycle race held in Belgium, starting and ending in the town of Huy. The race included two climbs of the Mur de Huy; the finish line was at the top of the second of these ascents.

The race was won by Anna van der Breggen (Boels–Dolmans).

== Teams ==
Twenty-four teams participated in the race. Each team had a maximum of six riders:

Professional women's teams

- Boels–Dolmans
- WM3 Energie
- Wiggle High5
- Canyon//SRAM
- Orica–Scott
- Servetto Giusta
- Lotto–Soudal Ladies
- Cervélo–Bigla Pro Cycling
- Alé–Cipollini
- BTC City Ljubljana
- Team Sunweb
- Team Hitec Products
- Bepink–Cogeas
- Lensworld–Kuota
- Cylance Pro Cycling
- Lares–Waowdeals
- Astana
- FDJ Nouvelle-Aquitaine Futuroscope
- Bizkaia–Durango
- S.C. Michela Fanini Rox
- Drops
- Sport Vlaanderen–Etixx
- Team Virtu Cycling

National team

- France

== Results ==
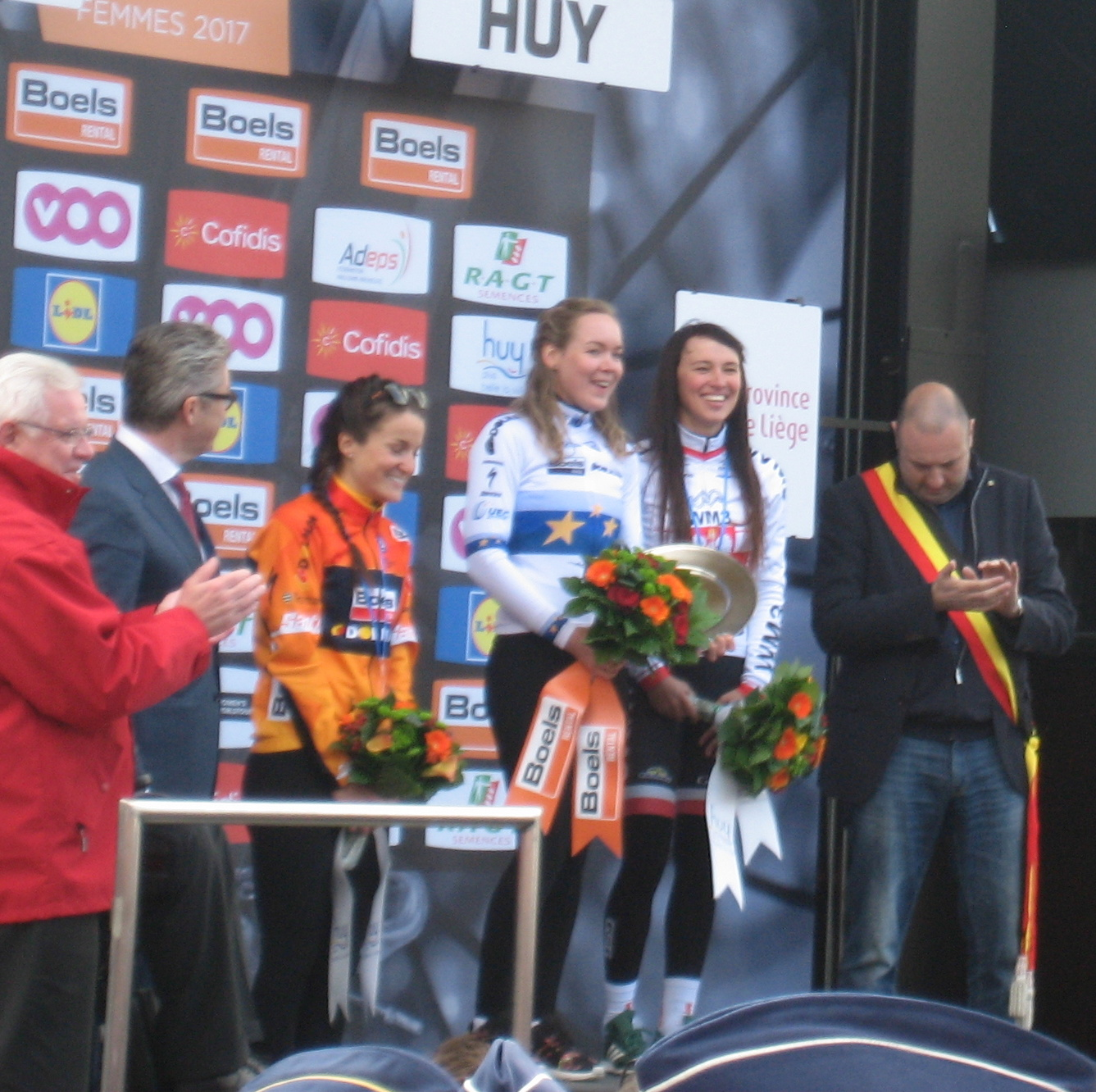
Podium ceremony.

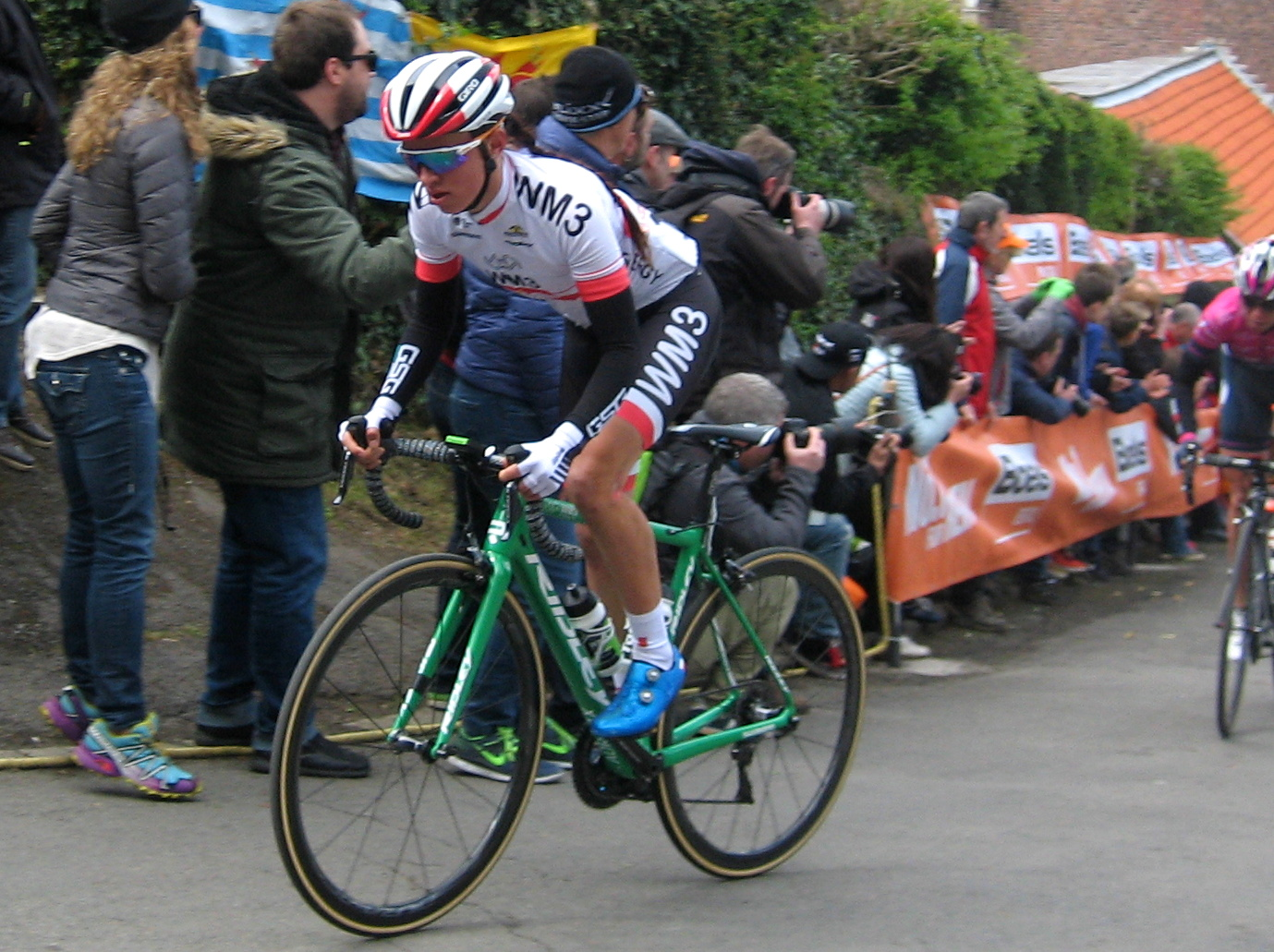
Niewiadoma at the Mur de Huy.

Result
| Rank | Rider | Team | Time |
|---|---|---|---|
| 1 | Anna van der Breggen (NED) | Boels–Dolmans | 3h 21' 06" |
| 2 | Lizzie Deignan (GBR) | Boels–Dolmans | + 16" |
| 3 | Katarzyna Niewiadoma (POL) | WM3 Energie | + 25" |
| 4 | Annemiek van Vleuten (NED) | Orica–Scott | + 43" |
| 5 | Shara Gillow (AUS) | FDJ Nouvelle-Aquitaine Futuroscope | + 49" |
| 6 | Ashleigh Moolman-Pasio (RSA) | Cervélo–Bigla Pro Cycling | + 54" |
| 7 | Coryn Rivera (USA) | Team Sunweb | + 56" |
| 8 | Janneke Ensing (NED) | Alé–Cipollini | + 58" |
| 9 | Katrin Garfoot (AUS) | Orica–Scott | + 1'00" |
| 10 | Flávia Oliveira (BRA) | Lares–Waowdeals | + 1'02" |
