= 2014 Ladies Tour of Norway =

Race details
- Dates: 15–17 August 2014
- Stages: 3 stages
- Distance: 243 km (151 mi)
- Winning time: 5h 38' 11"

Results
Jersey awarded to the overall winner	Winner	Anna van der Breggen (NED)	(Rabobank-Liv Woman Cycling Team)
	Second	Marianne Vos (NED)	(Rabobank-Liv Woman Cycling Team)
	Third	Katarzyna Niewiadoma (POL)	(Rabobank-Liv Woman Cycling Team)
Jersey awarded to the points classification winner	Points	Anna van der Breggen (NED)	(Rabobank-Liv Woman Cycling Team)
Jersey awarded to the mountains classification winner	Mountains	Katarzyna Niewiadoma (POL)	(Rabobank-Liv Woman Cycling Team)
Jersey awarded to the young rider classification winner	Young rider	Katarzyna Niewiadoma (POL)	(Rabobank-Liv Woman Cycling Team)
	Team	Rabobank-Liv Woman Cycling Team	

The 2014 Ladies Tour of Norway was the first edition of the Ladies Tour of Norway, a women's cycling stage race in Norway. It was rated by the UCI as a category 2.2 race. It was won by Anna van der Breggen of Rabobank-Liv Woman Cycling Team.

== Stages ==
=== Prologue ===
15 August 2014 – Halden to Halden, 3 km (1.9 mi)

Prologue result & General classification

	Rider	Team	Time
1	Marianne Vos (NED)	Rabobank-Liv Woman Cycling Team	3' 39"
2	Lisa Brennauer (GER)	Specialized–lululemon	+ 3"
3	Annemiek van Vleuten (NED)	Rabobank-Liv Woman Cycling Team	+ 4"
4	Anna van der Breggen (NED)	Rabobank-Liv Woman Cycling Team	+ 7"
5	Roxane Knetemann (NED)	Rabobank-Liv Woman Cycling Team	+ 11"
6	Thalita de Jong (NED)	Rabobank-Liv Woman Cycling Team	+ 12"
7	Melissa Hoskins (AUS)	Orica–AIS	+ 12"
8	Annette Edmondson (AUS)	Orica–AIS	+ 12"
9	Lotta Lepistö (FIN)	Bigla Cycling Team	+ 13"
10	Elke Gebhardt (GER)	Bigla Cycling Team	+ 14"

=== Stage 1 ===
16 August 2014 – Strømstad to Halden, 111 km (69.0 mi)

Stage 1 result

	Rider	Team	Time
1	Anna van der Breggen (NED)	Rabobank-Liv Woman Cycling Team	2h 40' 12"
2	Rossella Ratto (ITA)	Estado de México–Faren Kuota	+ 29"
3	Katarzyna Niewiadoma (POL)	Rabobank-Liv Woman Cycling Team	+ 29"
4	Jessie MacLean (AUS)	Orica–AIS	+ 29"
5	Evelyn Stevens (USA)	Specialized–lululemon	+ 33"
6	Marianne Vos (NED)	Rabobank-Liv Woman Cycling Team	+ 38"
7	Melissa Hoskins (AUS)	Orica–AIS	+ 38"
8	Tiffany Cromwell (AUS)	Specialized–lululemon	+ 38"
9	Emma Johansson (SWE)	Orica–AIS	+ 38"
10	Kelly Druyts (BEL)	Topsport Vlaanderen–Pro-Duo	+ 38"

General classification after stage 1

	Rider	Team	Time
1	Anna van der Breggen (NED)	Rabobank-Liv Woman Cycling Team	2h 43' 47"
2	Marianne Vos (NED)	Rabobank-Liv Woman Cycling Team	+ 42"
3	Katarzyna Niewiadoma (POL)	Rabobank-Liv Woman Cycling Team	+ 43"
4	Lisa Brennauer (GER)	Specialized–lululemon	+ 45"
5	Rossella Ratto (ITA)	Estado de México–Faren Kuota	+ 45"
6	Annemiek van Vleuten (NED)	Rabobank-Liv Woman Cycling Team	+ 46"
7	Jessie MacLean (AUS)	Orica–AIS	+ 52"
8	Roxane Knetemann (NED)	Rabobank-Liv Woman Cycling Team	+ 53"
9	Thalita de Jong (NED)	Rabobank-Liv Woman Cycling Team	+ 53"
10	Melissa Hoskins (AUS)	Orica–AIS	+ 53"

=== Stage 2 ===
17 August 2014 – Fredriksten Fortress to Fredriksten Fortress, 129 km (80.2 mi)

Stage 2 result

	Rider	Team	Time
1	Marianne Vos (NED)	Rabobank-Liv Woman Cycling Team	2h 54' 30"
2	Anna van der Breggen (NED)	Rabobank-Liv Woman Cycling Team	s.t.
3	Katarzyna Niewiadoma (POL)	Rabobank-Liv Woman Cycling Team	s.t.
4	Tiffany Cromwell (AUS)	Specialized–lululemon	s.t.
5	Emma Johansson (SWE)	Orica–AIS	s.t.
6	Rossella Ratto (NED)	Estado de México–Faren Kuota	+ 3"
7	Valentina Scandolara (ITA)	Orica–AIS	+ 10"
8	Roxane Knetemann (NED)	Rabobank-Liv Woman Cycling Team	+ 16"
9	Annemiek van Vleuten (NED)	Rabobank-Liv Woman Cycling Team	+ 42"
10	Romy Kasper (GER)	Boels–Dolmans	+ 1' 24"

General classification after stage 2

	Rider	Team	Time
1	Anna van der Breggen (NED)	Rabobank-Liv Woman Cycling Team	5h 38' 11"
2	Marianne Vos (NED)	Rabobank-Liv Woman Cycling Team	+ 38"
3	Katarzyna Niewiadoma (POL)	Rabobank-Liv Woman Cycling Team	+ 43"
4	Rossella Ratto (ITA)	Estado de México–Faren Kuota	+ 54"
5	Tiffany Cromwell (AUS)	Specialized–lululemon	+ 1' 02"
6	Emma Johansson (SWE)	Orica–AIS	+ 1' 02"
7	Valentina Scandolara (ITA)	Orica–AIS	+ 1' 13"
8	Roxane Knetemann (NED)	Rabobank-Liv Woman Cycling Team	+ 1' 15"
9	Annemiek van Vleuten (NED)	Rabobank-Liv Woman Cycling Team	+ 1' 34"
10	Thalita de Jong (NED)	Rabobank-Liv Woman Cycling Team	+ 2' 38"

== Classification progress ==
Stage	Winner	General classification	Points classification	Mountains classification	Youth classification	Team classification
P	Marianne Vos	Marianne Vos	Marianne Vos	Not awarded	Thalita de Jong	Rabobank-Liv Woman Cycling Team
1	Anna van der Breggen	Anna van der Breggen	Anna van der Breggen	Anna van der Breggen	Katarzyna Niewiadoma	Rabobank-Liv Woman Cycling Team
2	Marianne Vos	Anna van der Breggen	Anna van der Breggen	Katarzyna Niewiadoma	Katarzyna Niewiadoma	Rabobank-Liv Woman Cycling Team
Final		Anna van der Breggen	Anna van der Breggen	Katarzyna Niewiadoma	Katarzyna Niewiadoma	Rabobank-Liv Woman Cycling Team
