= 2015 La Course by Le Tour de France =

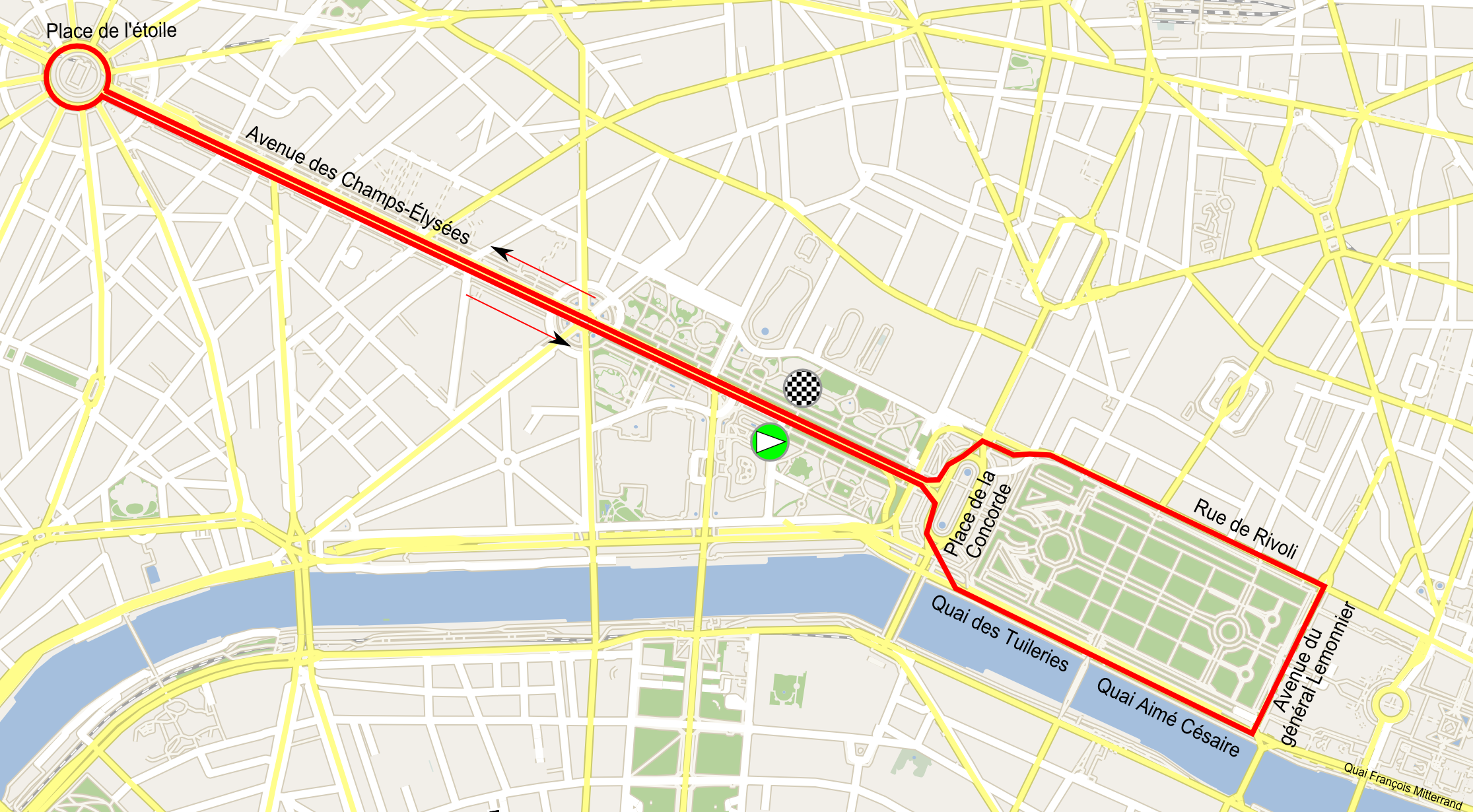

Race details
- Dates: 26 July 2015
- Stages: 1
- Distance: 89.0 km (55.3 mi)
- Winning time: 2h 05' 01"

Results
| | Winner | Anna van der Breggen (NED) | (Rabobank-Liv Woman Cycling Team) |
| | Second | Jolien D'Hoore (BEL) | (Wiggle–Honda) |
| | Third | Amy Pieters (NED) | (Team Liv–Plantur) |
| | Points | Mia Radotić (CRO) | (BTC City Ljubljana) |
| | Young rider | Christina Siggaard (DEN) | (Matrix Fitness Pro Cycling) |

The 2015 La Course by Le Tour de France was the second edition of La Course by Le Tour de France, a women's cycling race held in France. The race was held before the final stage of the 2015 Tour de France on 26 July. The race was rated by the UCI as a 1.1 category race. The event was organised by ASO, which also organises the Tour de France.

The race was won by Dutch rider Anna van der Breggen of Rabo-Liv in a sprint finish.

== Route ==
The race used the same course as the 2014 edition of the race, 13 laps of the traditional course on the Champs-Élysées in Paris – making a distance of 89 kilometres (55 miles).

== Teams ==
UCI Women's Teams

- Alé–Cipollini–Galassia
- Bigla Pro Cycling Team
- Bizkaia–Durango
- Boels–Dolmans
- BTC City Ljubljana
- Inpa Sottoli Giusfredi
- Lensworld.eu–Zannata
- Lotto–Soudal Ladies
- Matrix Fitness Pro Cycling
- Optum-Kelly Benefit Strategies
- Orica–AIS
- Poitou–Charentes.Futuroscope.86
- Rabo–Liv Women Cycling Team
- Team Hitec Products
- Team Liv–Plantur
- Topsport Vlaanderen–Pro-Duo
- UnitedHealthcare Women's Team
- Velocio–SRAM Pro Cycling
- Wiggle–Honda

National Teams

- France

== Race summary ==
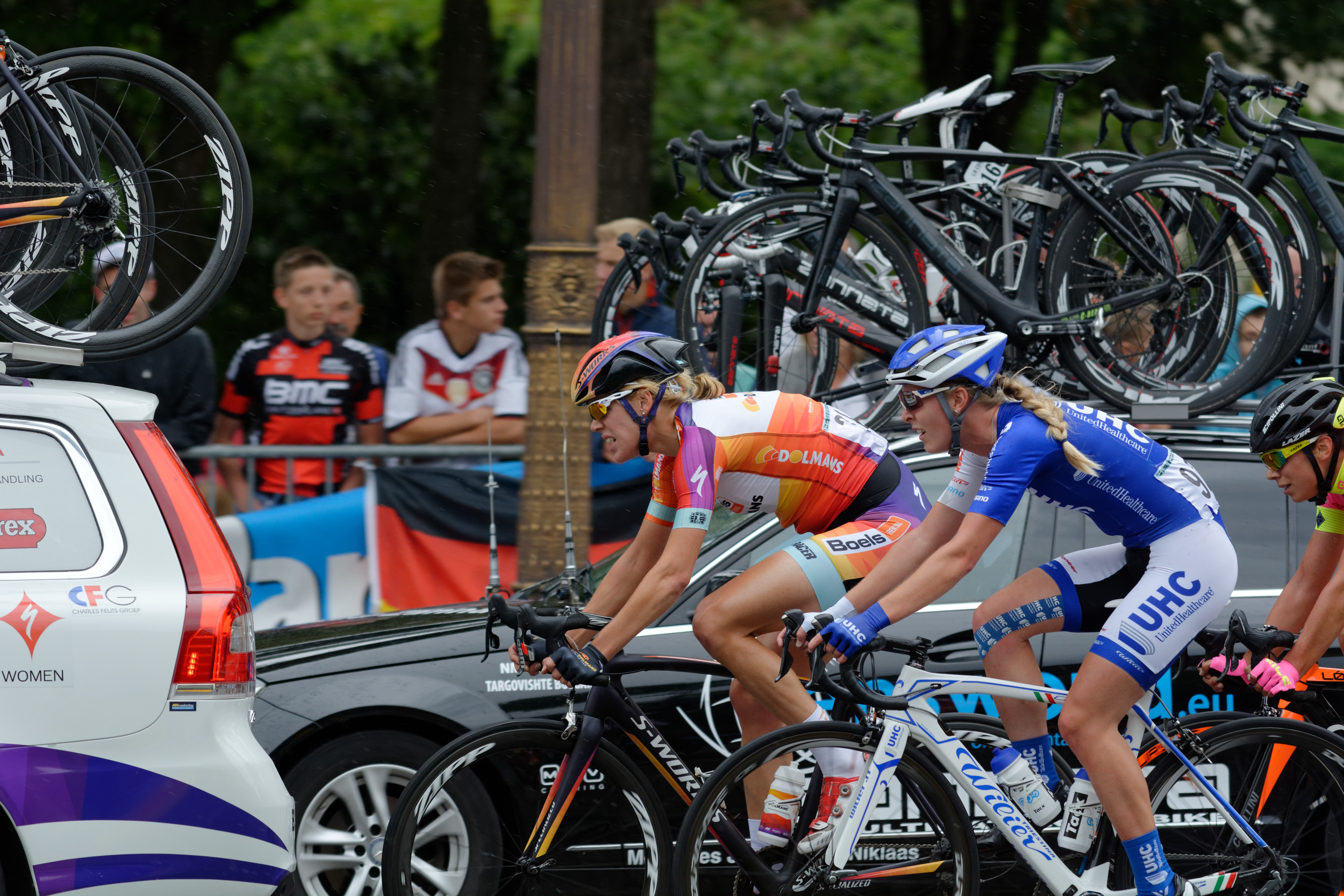
Ellen van Dijk back on the bike temporarily after she broke her collarbone.

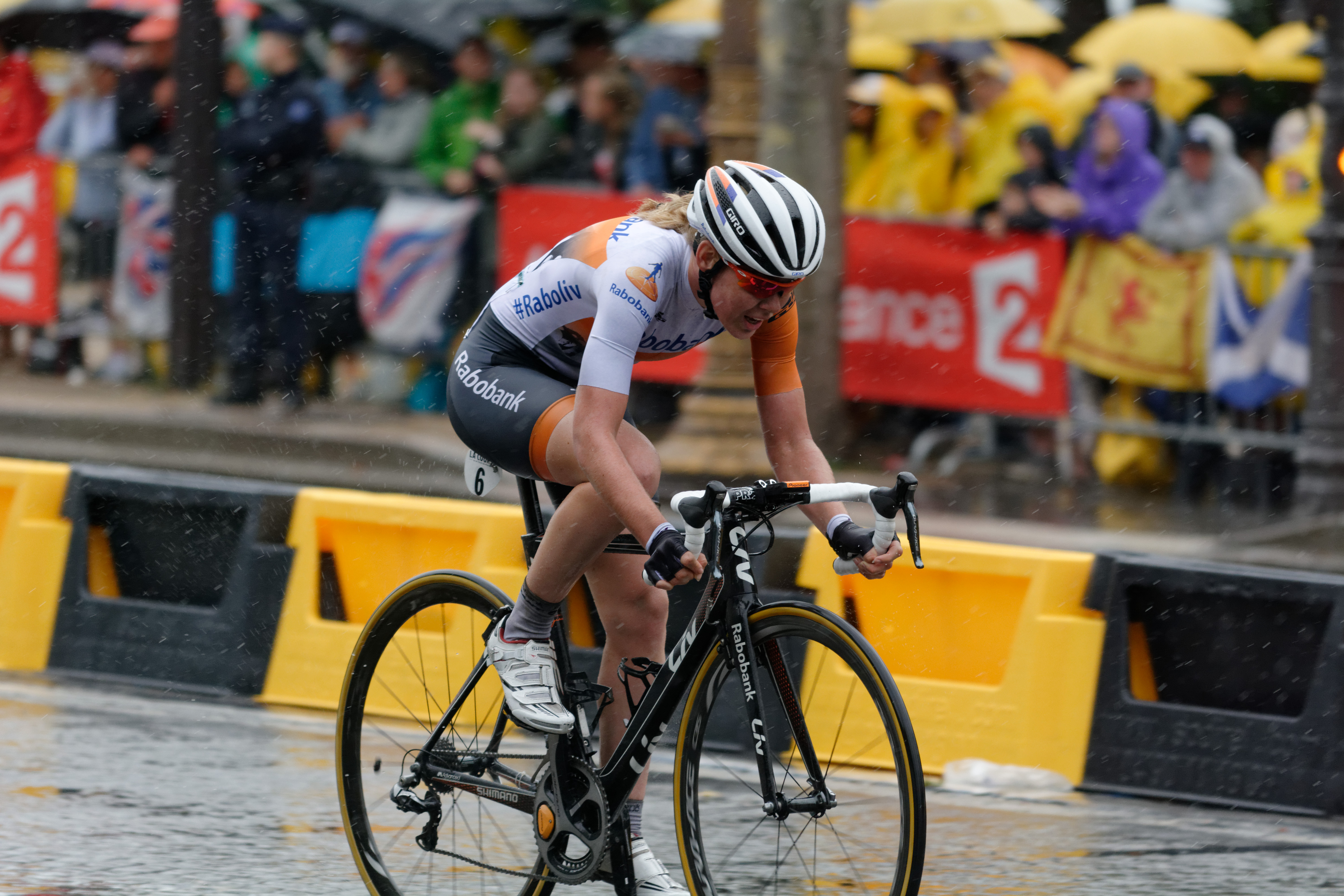
Anna van der Breggen riding solo to victory.

During the race the rain hammered down. The stones of the course were very slippery causing many crashes. Only 62 of the 196 riders who started the race finished. Dutch favorite Ellen van Dijk was involved in one of the first crashes. She broke her collarbone and had to abandon. Among other casualties were the world champion, Pauline Ferrand-Prévot, who went down in the closing kilometres, and Shelley Olds who crashed and remounted, only to lose her derailleur and be forced to abandon.

== Result ==
Race result

| | Cyclist | Team | Time |
|---|---|---|---|
| 1 | Anna van der Breggen (NED) | Rabobank-Liv Woman Cycling Team | 2h 00' 41" |
| 2 | Jolien D'Hoore (BEL) | Wiggle–Honda | + 1" |
| 3 | Amy Pieters (NED) | Team Liv–Plantur | + 1" |
| 4 | Lizzie Armitstead (GBR) | Boels–Dolmans | + 1" |
| 5 | Lotta Lepistö (FIN) | Bigla Pro Cycling Team | + 1" |
| 6 | Lisa Brennauer (GER) | Velocio–SRAM | + 1" |
| 7 | Emma Johansson (SWE) | Orica–AIS | + 1" |
| 8 | Lucinda Brand (NED) | Rabobank-Liv Woman Cycling Team | + 1" |
| 9 | Kirsten Wild (NED) | Team Hitec Products | + 1" |
| 10 | Christine Majerus (LUX) | Boels–Dolmans | + 1" |

== See also ==
- 2015 in women's road cycling
