= 2026 Trofeo Alfredo Binda-Comune di Cittiglio =

Cycling race

2026 Trofeo Alfredo Binda - Comune di Cittiglio
2026 UCI Women's World Tour, race 6 of 26

Race details
- Dates: 15 March 2026
- Stages: 1
- Distance: 146.1 km (90.8 mi)
- Winning time: 3h 53' 17"

Results
| | Winner | Karlijn Swinkels (NED) | (UAE Team ADQ) |
| | Second | Anna van der Breggen (NED) | (Team SD Worx–Protime) |
| | Third | Mie Bjørndal Ottestad (NOR) | (Uno-X Mobility) |

The 2026 Trofeo Alfredo Binda - Comune di Cittiglio (officially Trofeo Alfredo Binda - Comune di Cittiglio - Gran Premio Almar) was an Italian road cycling one-day race that took place on 15 March 2026. It was the 50th edition of Trofeo Alfredo Binda and the 6th event of the 2026 UCI Women's World Tour.

The race was won by Dutch rider Karlijn Swinkels of UAE Team ADQ, beating Anna van der Breggen of Team SD Worx–Protime and Mie Bjørndal Ottestad of Uno-X Mobility in a sprint finish. It was the first victory for Swinkels at World Tour level.

== Route ==
The race took place on a 146.1-kilometre (90.8 mi) course. The race started in Luino on the eastern edge of Lake Maggiore and initially followed the shoreline towards Porto Valtravaglia before turning back towards Germignaga. The route then headed to the Cittiglio finishing circuit, where five laps of the 18.4-kilometre (11.4 mi) took place, with climbs of Casalzuigno (800 m at 6.9%) and Orino (2.5 km at 5%) returning from the previous edition.

The route shorted from the original 152.7-kilometre (94.9 mi) length, as the Masciago Primo climb in the first 30 kilometres (19 mi) was omitted due to overnight snowfall.

== Teams ==
Twenty-three teams took part in the event, including fourteen UCI Women's WorldTeams, four UCI Women's ProTeams and five women's continental teams.

UCI Women's WorldTeams

- AG Insurance–Soudal
- Canyon//SRAM Zondacrypto
- EF Education–Oatly
- FDJ United–Suez
- Fenix–Premier Tech
- Human Powered Health
- Lidl–Trek
- Liv AlUla Jayco
- Movistar Team
- Team Picnic–PostNL
- Team SD Worx–Protime
- UAE Team ADQ
- Uno-X Mobility
- Visma–Lease a Bike

UCI Women's ProTeams

- Cofidis
- Laboral Kutxa–Fundación Euskadi
- Ma Petite Entreprise
- St. Michel–Preference Home–Auber93

UCI Women's Continental Teams

- Aromitalia Vaiano
- Isolmant–Premac–Vittoria
- Team Mendelspeck E-Work
- Top Girls Fassa Bortolo
- Vini Fantini–BePink

== Result ==
Result
| Rank | Rider | Team | Time |
|---|---|---|---|
| 1 | Karlijn Swinkels (NED) | UAE Team ADQ | 3h 53' 17" |
| 2 | Anna van der Breggen (NED) | Team SD Worx–Protime | + 0" |
| 3 | Mie Bjørndal Ottestad (NOR) | Uno-X Mobility | + 3" |
| 4 | Blanka Vas (HUN) | Team SD Worx–Protime | + 47" |
| 5 | Letizia Borghesi (ITA) | AG Insurance–Soudal | + 47" |
| 6 | Marianne Vos (NED) | Visma–Lease a Bike | + 47" |
| 7 | Lotte Kopecky (BEL) | Team SD Worx–Protime | + 47" |
| 8 | Noemi Rüegg (SUI) | EF Education–Oatly | + 47" |
| 9 | Célia Gery (FRA) | FDJ United–Suez | + 47" |
| 10 | Shirin van Anrooij (NED) | Lidl–Trek | + 47" |
