= 2017 Amstel Gold Race (women's race) =

2017 Amstel Gold Race for Women
2017 UCI Women's World Tour, race 6 of 20
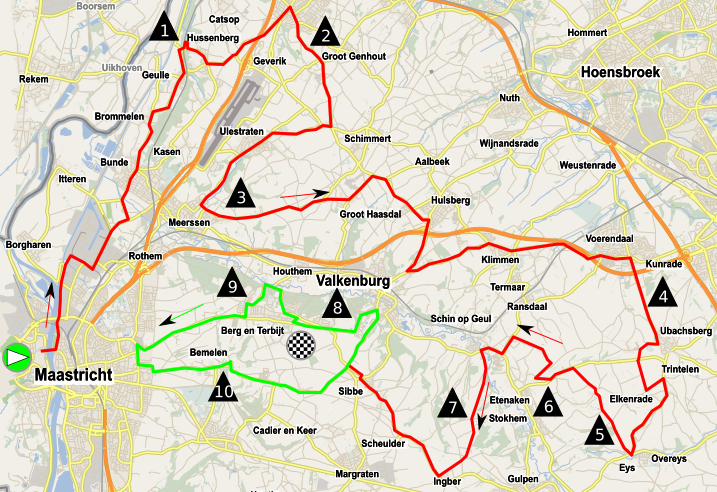

Race details
- Dates: 16 April 2017
- Stages: 1
- Distance: 121.6 km (75.6 mi)
- Winning time: 3h 15' 57"

Results
	Winner	Anna van der Breggen (NED)	(Boels–Dolmans)
	Second	Lizzie Deignan (GBR)	(Boels–Dolmans)

The fourth edition of the Amstel Gold Race for Women was a road cycling one-day race held on 16 April 2017 in the Netherlands. It was the sixth event of the 2017 UCI Women's World Tour. The race started in Maastricht and finished in Berg en Terblijt, containing 17 categorized climbs, covering a total distance of 121.6 km. It was won by Dutch rider Anna van der Breggen.

It was the first edition of the women's Amstel Gold Race after a 14-year hiatus. With the reboot of the women's event and the creation of a women's Liège–Bastogne–Liège, in addition to La Flèche Wallonne Féminine, the women's season has the same trio of Ardennes classics as the men's. Van der Breggen won all three races in 2017.

== Route ==
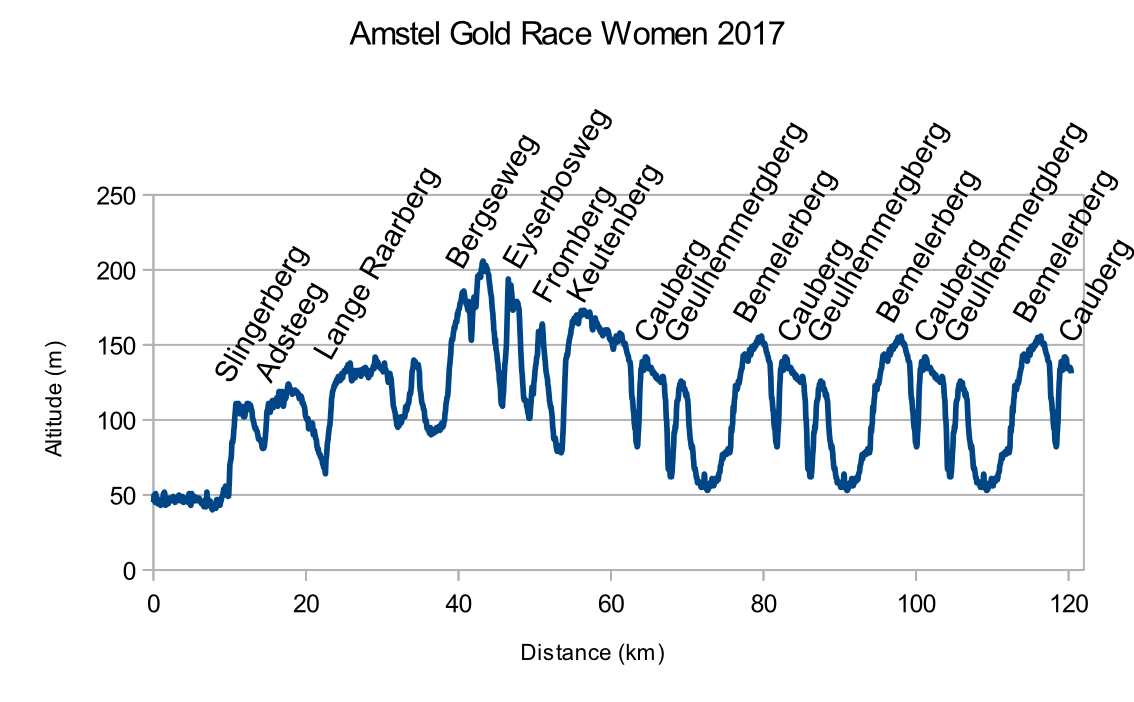
The race profile featured four ascents of the Cauberg

The race started on Maastricht's Markt, the city's central market square, and finished in Berg en Terblijt, covering 121.6 km. The route was made up of one bigger loop in the south of Limburg, followed by three 17.6 km loops centering around Valkenburg which featured the Geulhemmerberg, Bemelerberg and Cauberg climbs. In total, the route contained 17 categorized hills, usually short but with a varying gradient and coming in quick succession throughout the race. The Cauberg was addressed four times; its last crossing was also the last climb of the day. From the top of the Cauberg, there was a 1.7 km run-in to the finish line in Berg en Terblijt.

== Teams ==
Twenty-one teams participated in the race. Each team had a maximum of six riders:

Professional women's teams

- Boels–Dolmans
- Wiggle High5
- WM3 Energie
- Team Sunweb
- Canyon//SRAM
- Orica–Scott
- Cervélo–Bigla Pro Cycling
- Alé–Cipollini
- Cylance Pro Cycling
- Bepink–Cogeas
- Team Hitec Products
- Lares–Waowdeals
- Lensworld–Kuota
- FDJ Nouvelle-Aquitaine Futuroscope
- BTC City Ljubljana
- Lotto–Soudal Ladies
- Astana
- Servetto Giusta
- Parkhotel Valkenburg–Destil
- Team Virtu Cycling
- Sport Vlaanderen–Guill D'or

== Results ==
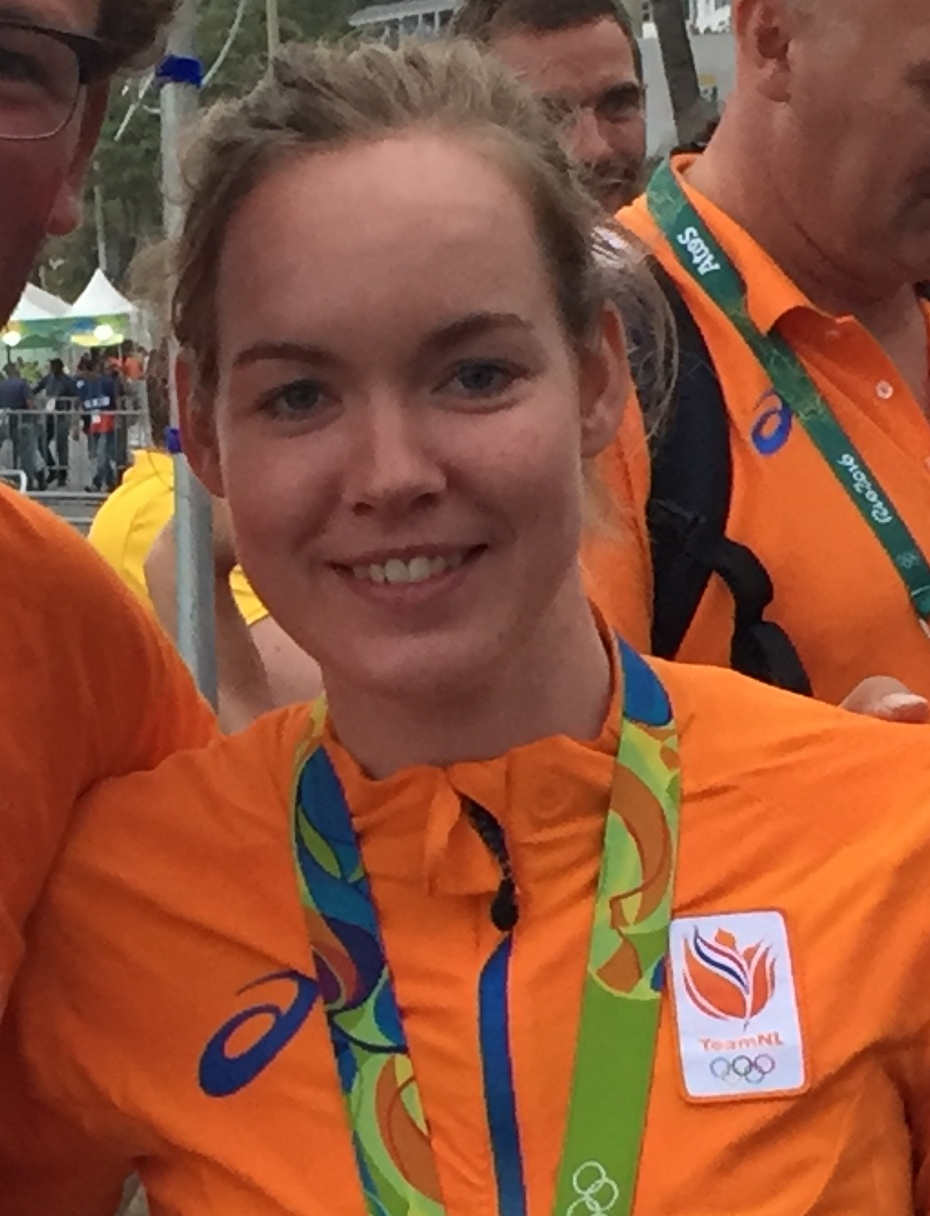
Anna van der Breggen won the women's reboot edition in 2017.

Race officials were unable to split Katarzyna Niewiadoma (POL) (WM3 Energie) and Annemiek van Vleuten (NED) (Orica–Scott) in the photo-finish for the third place.

Final general classification

Rank	Rider	Team	Time
1	Anna van der Breggen (NED)	Boels–Dolmans	3h 15' 57"
2	Elizabeth Deignan (GBR)	Boels–Dolmans	+ 55"
=3	Annemiek van Vleuten (NED)	Orica–Scott	s.t.
=3	Katarzyna Niewiadoma (POL)	WM3 Energie	s.t.
5	Elisa Longo Borghini (ITA)	Wiggle High5	s.t.
6	Coryn Rivera (USA)	Team Sunweb	+ 1' 02"
7	Amy Pieters (NED)	Boels–Dolmans	+ 1' 51"
8	Pauline Ferrand-Prévot (FRA)	Canyon//SRAM	s.t.
9	Ashleigh Moolman (RSA)	Cervélo–Bigla Pro Cycling	s.t.
10	Ellen van Dijk (NED)	Team Sunweb	s.t.
