= Mur de Huy =

Hill in Wallonia, Belgium

Coordinates: 50.51545°N 5.24666°E

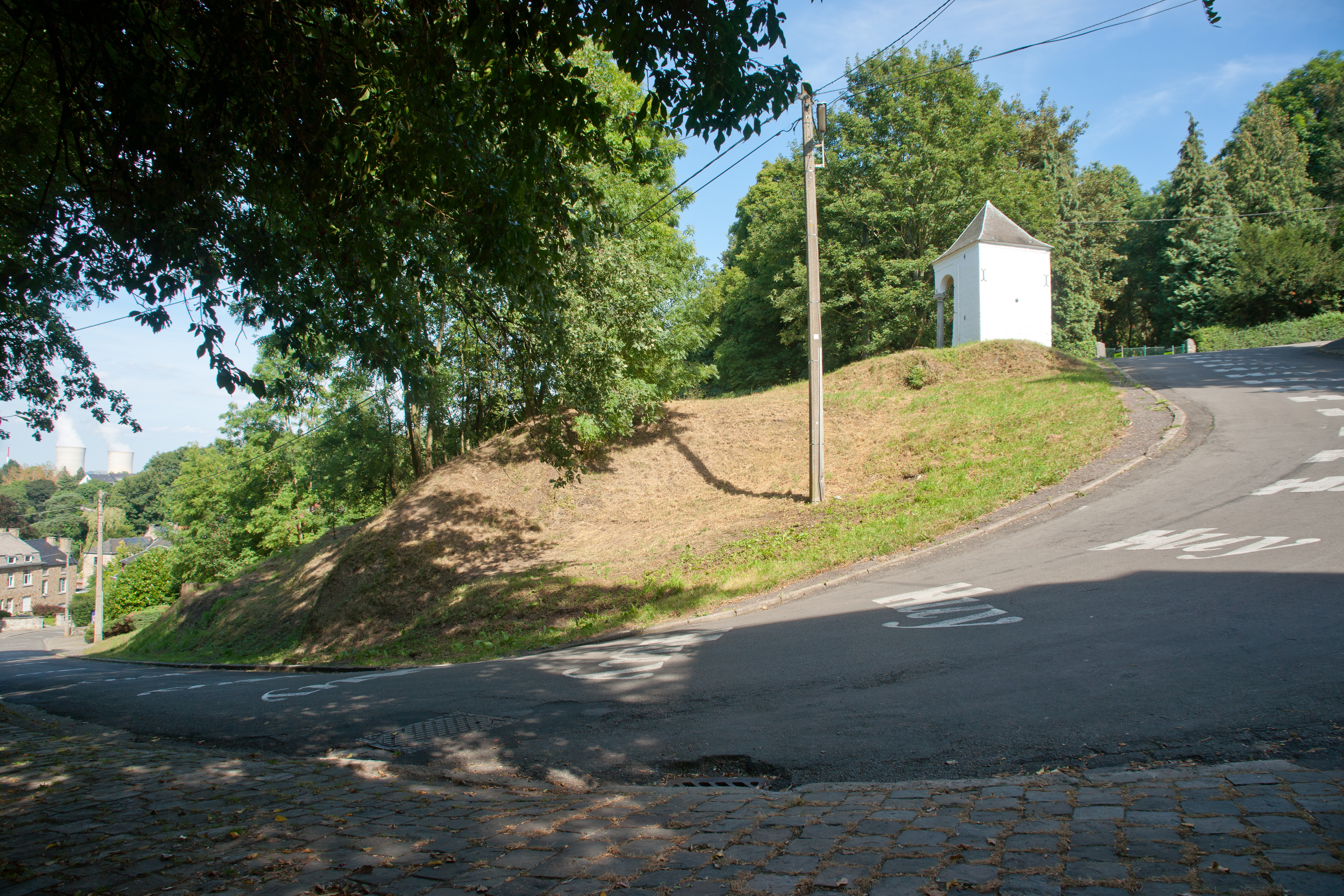
- One of the steepest bends of the Mur de Huy
- Location: Wallonia, Belgium
- Start: Huy
- Gain in altitude: 121 m (397 ft)
- Length of climb: 1.3 km (0.81 mi)
- Elevation: 204 m (669 ft)
- Average gradient: 9.3 %
- Maximum gradient: 26 %

The Mur de Huy (English: Wall of Huy) is a 128 metres (420 ft) high hill located in Huy, Wallonia, Belgium. It is also known as le Chemin des Chapelles (English: The Path of the Chapels) because of the seven chapels along its route. This climb is famous for being part of the route of La Flèche Wallonne professional cycling race. It also served as the finish for the third stage of the 2015 Tour de France.

== La Flèche Wallonne ==
The Mur de Huy has been the site of the finishing line of the Flèche Wallonne since 1984 and of the La Flèche Wallonne Féminine since 1998. It is climbed three times for men and two times for women, with the finishing line at the top of the last climb up the Mur. The climb has a length of 1,300 m (4,300 ft) with an average grade of 9.3 % and some sections around 17 % (up to 26 % in one bend). The Flèche Wallonne is often decided on its slopes.
