= List of 2013 UCI Women's Teams and riders =

Listed below are the UCI Women's Teams that compete in 2013 women's road cycling events organized by the International Cycling Union (UCI), including the 2013 UCI Women's Road World Cup.

== Teams overview ==
The country designation of each team is determined by the country of registration of the largest number of its riders, and is not necessarily the country where the team is registered or based.

List updated 4 August 2013

Code	Official Team Name	Country	Website
GEW	Orica–AIS	Australia	greenedgecycling.com
SQS	Squadra Scappatella	Austria	
CZT	Cyclelive Plus–Zannata	Belgium	
LBL	Lotto–Belisol Ladies	Belgium	lottobelisol.be
SLT	Sengers Ladies Cycling Team	Belgium	sengerslct.be
VLL	Topsport Vlaanderen–Bioracer	Belgium	
GKS	GSD Gestion-Kallisto	Canada	
BPD	Bizkaia–Durango	Spain	
LKT	Lointek	Spain	
BCF	Bourgogne–Pro Dialog	France	
FUT	Vienne Futuroscope	France	teampolaris.nl
WHT	Wiggle–Honda (2013 season)	United Kingdom	wigglehonda.com
GPC	China Chongming–Giant Pro Cycling	Hong Kong	cycling-sports.com
BPK	BePink	Italy	bepink.eu
FLF	Faren–Kuota	Italy	
MCG	MCipollini–Giordana	Italy	mcipollinigiordanateam.com
MIC	S.C. Michela Fanini-Rox	Italy	michelafanini.com
SEF	Servetto Footon	Italy	
TOG	Top Girls Fassa Bortolo	Italy	
VAI	Vaiano Fondriest	Italy	vcvaiano.com
FCL	Chirio Forno d'Asolo	Lithuania	
PZC	Pasta Zara–Cogeas	Lithuania	
DLT	Boels–Dolmans Cycling Team (2013 season)	Netherlands	dolmanslandscapingteam.nl
RBW	Rabo Women Cycling Team	Netherlands	rabosport.com
ARW	Team Argos–Shimano (2013 season)	Netherlands	1t4i.com
TPO	Team Futurumshop.nl	Netherlands	
HPU	Hitec Products UCK	Norway	hitecproducts-uck.no
RVL	RusVelo	Russia	rusvelo.pro
AGG	Cramo Go:green	Sweden	
EXG	Exergy TWENTY16	United States	
OPW	Optum p/b Kelly Benefit Strategies	United States	
SLU	Specialized–lululemon (2013 season)	United States	velociosports.com
TIB	Team TIBCO–To The Top	United States	teamtibco.com
TPW	Team Pratomagno Women	Uzbekistan	

== Riders ==
=== BePink ===
As of April 2013.

Rider	Date of birth
Alice Algisi (ITA)	10 March 1993 (age 33)
Alena Amialiusik (BLR)	6 February 1989 (age 37)
Noemi Cantele (ITA)	17 July 1981 (age 45)
Giulia Donato (ITA)	26 September 1992 (age 34)
Chiara Favaron Bissoli (ITA)	16 September 1992 (age 34)
Simona Frapporti (ITA)	14 July 1988 (age 38)
Daniela Levi (ISR)	13 May 1992 (age 34)

Rider	Date of birth
Dalia Muccioli (ITA)	22 May 1993 (age 33)
Ilaria Sanguineti (ITA)	16 October 1989 (age 37)
Doris Schweizer (SUI)	28 August 1989 (age 37)
Silvia Valsecchi (ITA)	19 July 1982 (age 44)
Georgia Williams (NZL)	25 August 1993 (age 33)
Małgorzata Wojtyra (POL)	21 September 1989 (age 37)
Petra Zrimšek (SLO)	19 May 1988 (age 38)

=== Bizkaia–Durango ===
Ages as of 1 January 2013.

Rider	Date of birth
Cristina Alcalde Huertanos (ESP)	March 3, 1980 (aged 32)
Polona Batagelj (SLO)	June 7, 1989 (aged 23)
Ruth Corset (AUS)	May 9, 1977 (aged 35)
Dorleta Eskamendi Gil (ESP)	January 2, 1992 (aged 20)
Elena Lloret Llinares (ESP)	October 16, 1994 (aged 18)
Amaia Martioda (ESP)	May 12, 1990 (aged 22)
Mayalen Noriega (ESP)	February 19, 1982 (aged 30)

Rider	Date of birth
Leire Olaberria Dorronsoro (ESP)	February 17, 1977 (aged 35)
Lourdes Oyarbide Jimenez (ESP)	April 8, 1994 (aged 18)
Irene San Sebastian Lasa (ESP)	February 21, 1990 (aged 22)
Anna Sanchis Chafer (ESP)	October 18, 1987 (aged 25)
Ane Santesteban Gonzalez (ESP)	December 12, 1990 (aged 22)
Lilibeth Chacón García (VEN)	March 1, 1992 (aged 20)
Gloria Rodríguez Sánchez (ESP)	March 6, 1992 (aged 20)

=== Boels–Dolmans Cycling Team ===
As of 1 January 2013. Ages as of 1 January 2013.

Rider	Date of birth
Lizzie Armitstead (GBR)	December 18, 1988 (aged 24)
Martine Bras (NED)	May 17, 1978 (aged 34)
Jessie Daams (BEL)	May 28, 1990 (aged 22)
Kim de Baat (NED)	May 29, 1991 (aged 21)
Romy Kasper (GER)	February 10, 1992 (aged 20)
Nina Kessler (NED)	July 4, 1988 (aged 24)

Rider	Date of birth
Lucy Martin (GBR)	May 5, 1990 (aged 22)
Pauliena Rooijakkers (NED)	May 12, 1993 (aged 19)
Emma Trott (GBR)	December 24, 1989 (aged 23)
Marieke van Wanroij (NED)	July 5, 1979 (aged 33)
Adrie Visser (NED)	October 19, 1983 (aged 29)

=== Bourgogne–Pro Dialog ===
Ages as of 1 January 2013.

Rider	Date of birth
Fleur Faure (FRA)	August 13, 1993 (aged 19)
Lucie Pader (FRA)	December 21, 1992 (aged 20)
Marion Sicot (FRA)	June 24, 1992 (aged 20)
Mélanie Pette (FRA)	August 27, 1987 (aged 25)

Rider	Date of birth
Élise Delzenne (FRA)	January 28, 1989 (aged 23)
Iris Sachet (FRA)	May 29, 1994 (aged 18)
Oriane Niay (FRA)	September 29, 1989 (aged 23)
Roxana Islas (MEX)	April 23, 1982 (aged 30)

=== China Chongming–Giant Pro Cycling ===
Ages as of 1 January 2013.

Rider	Date of birth
Huang Dongyan (CHN)	December 14, 1993 (aged 19)
Huang Li (CHN)	December 23, 1988 (aged 24)
Jiang Xiujie (CHN)	January 5, 1989 (aged 23)
Liang Hongyu (CHN)	October 23, 1990 (aged 22)
Liu Xiao Hui (CHN)	August 5, 1989 (aged 23)
Liu Xin (CHN)	November 5, 1986 (aged 26)
Luo Xiaoling (CHN)	September 20, 1988 (aged 24)
Meng Lang (CHN)	March 6, 1984 (aged 28)

Rider	Date of birth
Shen Fan Li (CHN)	July 15, 1991 (aged 21)
Sheng Yongyan (CHN)	September 5, 1987 (aged 25)
Shi Lina (CHN)	January 12, 1991 (aged 21)
Wang Cui (CHN)	October 15, 1989 (aged 23)
Wong Wan Yiu Jamie (HKG)	November 4, 1986 (aged 26)
Zhang Nan (CHN)	March 5, 1989 (aged 23)
Zhang Yuzhuo (CHN)	December 6, 1987 (aged 25)
Zhao Na (CHN)	April 29, 1984 (aged 28)

=== Chirio Forno d'Asolo ===
Ages as of 1 January 2013.

Rider	Date of birth
Alena Sitsko (BLR)	December 4, 1987 (aged 25)
Uênia Fernandes de Souza (BRA)	August 12, 1984 (aged 28)
Clemilda Fernandes (BRA)	June 25, 1979 (aged 33)
Yuliya Martisova (RUS)	June 15, 1976 (aged 36)
Chiara Agnelli (ITA)	April 20, 1994 (aged 18)
Vilija Sereikaitė (LTU)	February 12, 1987 (aged 25)

Rider	Date of birth
Aušrinė Trebaitė (LTU)	October 18, 1988 (aged 24)
Eglė Zablockytė (LTU)	May 24, 1989 (aged 23)
Vaida Pikauskaitė (LTU)	March 29, 1991 (aged 21)
Rasa Mažeikytė (LTU)	March 31, 1976 (aged 36)
Jessica Uebelhart (SUI)	October 16, 1990 (aged 22)
Tetyana Ryabchenko (UKR)	August 28, 1989 (aged 23)

=== Cramo Go:green ===
Ages as of 1 January 2013.

Rider	Date of birth
Jessica Kihlbom (SWE)	June 11, 1989 (aged 23)
Linnea Sjöblom (SWE)	November 12, 1989 (aged 23)
Madelene Olsson (SWE)	November 14, 1982 (aged 30)
Hanna Nilsson (SWE)	February 16, 1992 (aged 20)
Mirella Ehrin (SWE)	August 19, 1976 (aged 36)

Rider	Date of birth
Johanna Nilsson (SWE)	November 21, 1990 (aged 22)
Martina Thomasson (SWE)	February 22, 1985 (aged 27)
Alexandra Nessmar (SWE)	June 23, 1994 (aged 18)
Isabelle Söderberg (SWE)	May 28, 1989 (aged 23)
Hanna Helamb (SWE)	March 30, 1994 (aged 18)

=== Cyclelive Plus–Zannata ===
Ages as of 1 January 2013.

Rider	Date of birth
Carla Ryan (AUS)	September 21, 1985 (aged 27)
Annelies Dom (BEL)	April 8, 1986 (aged 26)
Latoya Brulee (BEL)	December 9, 1988 (aged 24)
Lieselot Decroix (BEL)	May 12, 1987 (aged 25)
Grace Verbeke (BEL)	November 12, 1984 (aged 28)

Rider	Date of birth
Annelies Van Doorslaer (BEL)	January 15, 1989 (aged 23)
Daisy Depoorter (BEL)	September 23, 1992 (aged 20)
Elizabeth Hatch (USA)	June 3, 1980 (aged 32)
Monique van de Ree (NED)	March 2, 1988 (aged 24)
Marissa Otten (NED)	July 11, 1989 (aged 23)

=== Exergy TWENTY16 ===
Ages as of 1 January 2013.

Rider	Date of birth
Kaitlin Antonneau (USA)	January 1, 1992 (aged 21)
Alison Tetrick (USA)	April 4, 1985 (aged 27)
Greta Neimanas (USA)	May 4, 1988 (aged 24)
Christa Ghent (USA)	April 9, 1990 (aged 22)
Andrea Dvorak (USA)	October 9, 1980 (aged 32)
Kayla Sterling (USA)	January 13, 1994 (aged 18)
Mara Abbott (USA)	November 14, 1985 (aged 27)

Rider	Date of birth
Jacquelyn Crowell (USA)	February 16, 1988 (aged 24)
Kristin McGrath (USA)	October 21, 1982 (aged 30)
Rebecca Balboni (USA)	August 24, 1980 (aged 32)
Jennifer Valente (USA)	December 24, 1994 (aged 18)
Lauren Tamayo (USA)	October 25, 1983 (aged 29)
Heather Fischer (USA)	November 28, 1988 (aged 24)

=== Faren Kuota ===
Ages as of 1 January 2013.

Rider	Date of birth
Jutta Nieminen (FIN)	April 26, 1978 (aged 34)
Christel Ferrier-Bruneau (FRA)	July 8, 1979 (aged 33)
Stella Riverditi (ITA)	February 7, 1994 (aged 18)
Susanna Zorzi (ITA)	March 13, 1992 (aged 20)
Fabiana Luperini (ITA)	January 14, 1974 (aged 38)
Elena Cecchini (ITA)	May 25, 1992 (aged 20)
Maria Giulia Confalonieri (ITA)	March 30, 1993 (aged 19)

Rider	Date of birth
Marta Bastianelli (ITA)	April 30, 1987 (aged 25)
Giuseppina Grassi (MEX)	August 29, 1976 (aged 36)
Carolina Rodriguez Gutierrez (MEX)	September 30, 1993 (aged 19)
Ashlynn Van Baarle (NED)	November 2, 1994 (aged 18)
Sara Mustonen (SWE)	February 8, 1981 (aged 31)
Patricia Schwager (SUI)	December 6, 1983 (aged 29)

=== GSD Gestion-Kallisto ===
Ages as of 1 January 2013.

Rider	Date of birth
Lina-Kristin Schink (GER)	November 5, 1983 (aged 29)
Charlene Delev (GER)	July 20, 1989 (aged 23)
Flávia Oliveira (BRA)	October 27, 1981 (aged 31)
Stephanie Roorda (CAN)	December 3, 1986 (aged 26)
Kael Deverell (CAN)	August 5, 1989 (aged 23)
Catherine Couture (CAN)	July 9, 1989 (aged 23)
Audrey Labrie (CAN)	December 18, 1994 (aged 18)

Rider	Date of birth
Roxanne Pepin (CAN)	December 22, 1994 (aged 18)
Alizée Brien (CAN)	September 27, 1993 (aged 19)
Anne-Marie B. Morin (CAN)	September 29, 1992 (aged 20)
Claire Thomas (GBR)	December 9, 1972 (aged 40)
Mayra Del Rocio Rocha (MEX)	October 26, 1988 (aged 24)
Katarzyna Pawłowska (POL)	August 16, 1989 (aged 23)
Anna Harkowska (POL)	March 20, 1980 (aged 32)

=== Hitec Products UCK ===
As of 1 January 2013

Rider	Date of birth
Miriam Bjørnsrud (NOR)	October 9, 1992 (aged 20)
Emilia Fahlin (SWE)	October 24, 1988 (aged 24)
Daniela Glass (GER)	November 5, 1980 (aged 32)
Tone Hatteland Lima (NOR)	December 18, 1979 (aged 33)
Rakel Kristine Henriksen (NOR)	April 12, 1991 (aged 21)
Chloe Hosking (AUS)	October 1, 1990 (aged 22)
Cecilie Gotaas Johnsen (NOR)	April 20, 1976 (aged 36)
Elisa Longo Borghini (ITA)	December 10, 1991 (aged 21)

Rider	Date of birth
Siri Minge (NOR)	April 2, 1994 (aged 18)
Emilie Moberg (NOR)	July 12, 1991 (aged 21)
Rachel Neylan (AUS)	March 9, 1982 (aged 30)
Lise Hafsø Nøstvold (NOR)	February 14, 1987 (aged 25)
Margrethe Pedersen (NOR)	September 15, 1991 (aged 21)
Rossella Ratto (ITA)	October 20, 1993 (aged 19)
Thea Thorsen (NOR)	March 15, 1992 (aged 20)

=== Lointek ===
Ages as of 1 January 2013.

Rider	Date of birth
Emma Crum (NZL)	January 28, 1989 (aged 23)
Mathilde Favre (FRA)	September 15, 1993 (aged 19)
Lucía González Blanco (ESP)	July 9, 1990 (aged 22)
Edith Guillen (CRC)	March 5, 1985 (aged 27)
Sheyla Gutiérrez Ruiz (ESP)	January 1, 1994 (aged 19)
Yulia Ilinykh (RUS)	October 6, 1985 (aged 27)
Belén López Morales (ESP)	April 18, 1984 (aged 28)

Rider	Date of birth
Eider Merino Kortazar (ESP)	August 2, 1994 (aged 18)
Alexia Muffat (FRA)	November 15, 1992 (aged 20)
Maite Murguia (ESP)	January 14, 1992 (aged 20)
Fanny Riberot (FRA)	March 17, 1983 (aged 29)
Irene Usabiaga Balerdi (ESP)	September 22, 1993 (aged 19)
Elena Utrobina (RUS)	January 1, 1985 (aged 28)
Ana Usabiaga Balerdi (ESP)	January 19, 1990 (aged 22)

=== Lotto–Belisol Ladies ===
Ages as of 1 January 2013.

Rider	Date of birth
Marijn de Vries (NED)	November 19, 1978 (aged 34)
Jolien D'Hoore (BEL)	March 14, 1990 (aged 22)
Ann-Sophie Duyck (BEL)	July 23, 1987 (aged 25)
Kaat Hannes (BEL)	November 21, 1991 (aged 21)
Sharon Laws (GBR)	July 7, 1974 (aged 38)
Steffi Lodewyks (BEL)	May 22, 1993 (aged 19)

Rider	Date of birth
Ella Michal (ISR)	July 24, 1987 (aged 25)
Ashleigh Moolman-Pasio (RSA)	December 9, 1985 (aged 27)
Marion Rousse (FRA)	August 17, 1991 (aged 21)
Kim Schoonbaert (BEL)	March 2, 1986 (aged 26)
Carlee Taylor (AUS)	February 15, 1989 (aged 23)
Céline Van Severen (BEL)	September 17, 1993 (aged 19)

=== MCipollini–Giordana ===
Ages as of 1 January 2013.

Rider	Date of birth
Tatiana Antoshina (RUS)	July 27, 1982 (aged 30)
Monia Baccaille (ITA)	April 10, 1984 (aged 28)
Valentina Carretta (ITA)	September 16, 1989 (aged 23)
Sara Grifi (ITA)	September 26, 1988 (aged 24)
Tatiana Guderzo (ITA)	August 22, 1984 (aged 28)
Małgorzata Jasińska (POL)	January 18, 1984 (aged 28)

Rider	Date of birth
Michela Pavin (ITA)	July 15, 1994 (aged 18)
Sari Saarelainen (FIN)	March 1, 1981 (aged 31)
Valentina Scandolara (ITA)	May 1, 1990 (aged 22)
Anna Zita Maria Stricker (ITA)	July 3, 1994 (aged 18)
Marta Tagliaferro (ITA)	November 4, 1989 (aged 23)

=== Optum p/b Kelly Benefit Strategies ===
As of 22 June 2013.

Rider	Date of birth
Grace Alexander (USA)	22 May 1994 (age 32)
Annie Ewart (CAN)	25 September 1993 (age 33)
Amber Gaffney (USA)	27 December 1982 (age 43)
Lauren Hall (USA)	2 February 1979 (age 47)
Janel Holcomb (USA)	2 December 1978 (age 47)
Leah Kirchmann (CAN)	30 June 1990 (age 36)

Rider	Date of birth
Courteney Lowe (NZL)	26 March 1991 (age 35)
Joëlle Numainville (CAN)	20 November 1987 (age 38)
Denise Ramsden (CAN)	21 November 1990 (age 35)
Brianna Walle (USA)	25 April 1984 (age 42)
Jade Wilcoxson (USA)	17 March 1978 (age 48)

=== Orica–AIS ===
As of 1 January 2013.

Rider	Date of birth
Tiffany Cromwell (AUS)	6 July 1988 (age 38)
Annette Edmondson (AUS)	12 December 1991 (age 34)
Gracie Elvin (AUS)	31 October 1988 (age 38)
Shara Gillow (AUS)	23 December 1987 (age 38)
Loes Gunnewijk (NED)	27 November 1980 (age 45)

Rider	Date of birth
Melissa Hoskins (AUS)	24 February 1991 (age 35)
Emma Johansson (SWE)	23 September 1983 (age 43)
Jessie MacLean (AUS)	17 October 1985 (age 41)
Amanda Spratt (AUS)	17 September 1987 (age 39)
Gu Sun-Geun (KOR)	19 August 1984 (age 42)

=== Pasta Zara–Cogeas ===
As of 12 July 2013.

Rider	Date of birth
Addyson Albershardt (USA)	20 August 1994 (age 32)
Giada Borgato (ITA)	15 June 1989 (age 37)
Rossella Callovi (ITA)	5 April 1991 (age 35)
Inga Čilvinaitė (LTU)	14 February 1986 (age 40)
Íngrid Drexel (MEX)	28 July 1993 (age 33)
Véronique Fortin (CAN)	20 January 1980 (age 46)
Evelyn García (ESA)	29 December 1982 (age 43)

Rider	Date of birth
Edita Janeliūnaitė (LTU)	16 December 1988 (age 37)
Silvija Latožaitė (LTU)	20 November 1993 (age 32)
Amber Neben (USA)	18 February 1975 (age 51)
Amber Pierce (USA)	25 March 1981 (age 45)
Martina Růžičková (CZE)	22 March 1980 (age 46)
Agnė Šilinytė (LTU)	12 April 1991 (age 35)
Lorena María Vargas Villamil (COL)	27 July 1986 (age 40)

=== Rabo Women Cycling Team ===
As of 12 July 2013.

Rider	Date of birth
Lucinda Brand (NED)	2 July 1989 (age 37)
Pauline Ferrand-Prévot (FRA)	10 February 1992 (age 34)
Megan Guarnier (USA)	4 May 1985 (age 41)
Thalita de Jong (NED)	6 November 1993 (age 32)
Roxane Knetemann (NED)	1 April 1987 (age 39)
Jolanda Neff (SUI)	5 January 1993 (age 33)
Sanne van Paassen (NED)	27 October 1988 (age 38)

Rider	Date of birth
Iris Slappendel (NED)	18 February 1985 (age 41)
Sabrina Stultiens (NED)	8 July 1993 (age 33)
Rebecca Talen (NED)	27 October 1993 (age 33)
Annemiek van Vleuten (NED)	8 October 1982 (age 44)
Liesbet De Vocht (BEL)	5 January 1979 (age 47)
Marianne Vos (NED)	13 May 1987 (age 39)

=== RusVelo ===
Ages as of 1 January 2013.

Rider	Date of birth
Yulia Blindyuk (RUS)	December 11, 1984 (aged 28)
Elena Bocharnikova (RUS)	January 2, 1991 (aged 21)
Alexandra Burchenkova (RUS)	September 16, 1988 (aged 24)
Anastasia Chulkova (RUS)	March 7, 1985 (aged 27)
Oxana Kozonchuk (RUS)	May 28, 1988 (aged 24)
Elena Kuchinskaya (RUS)	December 11, 1984 (aged 28)

Rider	Date of birth
Hanka Kupfernagel (GER)	March 19, 1974 (aged 38)
Larisa Pankova (RUS)	May 12, 1991 (aged 21)
Evgenia Romanyuta (RUS)	January 22, 1988 (aged 24)
Maria Savitskaya (RUS)	April 22, 1991 (aged 21)
Olga Zabelinskaya (RUS)	May 10, 1980 (aged 32)
Aizhan Zhaparova (RUS)	May 1, 1989 (aged 23)

=== S.C. Michela Fanini-Rox ===
Ages as of 1 January 2013.

Rider	Date of birth
Aude Biannic (FRA)	March 27, 1991 (aged 21)
Gloria Boldrini (ITA)	February 16, 1994 (aged 18)
Carlotta Brui (ITA)	May 25, 1994 (aged 18)
Azzurra D'Intino (ITA)	October 25, 1991 (aged 21)
Mireia Epelde Bikendi (ESP)	October 29, 1985 (aged 27)
Lisa Gamba (ITA)	February 22, 1994 (aged 18)
Jutatip Maneephan (THA)	July 8, 1988 (aged 24)

Rider	Date of birth
Silvia Marsala (ITA)	June 19, 1993 (aged 19)
Edwige Pitel (FRA)	June 4, 1967 (aged 45)
Liisi Rist (EST)	June 25, 1991 (aged 21)
Grete Treier (EST)	December 12, 1977 (aged 35)
Lara Vieceli (ITA)	July 16, 1993 (aged 19)
Yevgeniya Vysotska (UKR)	December 11, 1975 (aged 37)

=== Sengers Ladies Cycling Team ===
Ages as of 1 January 2013.

Rider	Date of birth
Evelyn Arys (BEL)	2 July 1990 (age 36)
Sanne Bamelis (BEL)	24 February 1991 (age 35)
Kimberly Buyl (BEL)	11 September 1988 (age 38)
Sofie De Vuyst (BEL)	2 April 1987 (age 39)
Joanne Hogan (AUS)	9 June 1982 (age 44)
Gabriele Jankute (LTU)	18 December 1993 (age 32)
Vera Koedooder (NED)	31 October 1983 (age 43)
Veronika Anna Kormos (HUN)	17 August 1992 (age 34)

Rider	Date of birth
Birgit Lavrijssen (NED)	16 January 1991 (age 35)
Christine Majerus (LUX)	25 February 1987 (age 39)
Maaike Polspoel (BEL)	28 March 1989 (age 37)
Inge Roggeman (BEL)	13 April 1981 (age 45)
Geerike Schreurs (NED)	19 May 1989 (age 37)
Julia Soek (NED)	12 December 1990 (age 35)
Anna van der Breggen (NED)	18 April 1990 (age 36)
Karen Verhestraeten (BEL)	23 April 1991 (age 35)

=== Servetto Footon ===
Ages as of 1 January 2013.

Rider	Date of birth
Simona Bortolotti (ITA)	December 6, 1994 (aged 18)
Veronica Cornolti (ITA)	December 30, 1994 (aged 18)
Annalisa Cucinotta (ITA)	March 4, 1986 (aged 26)
Corinna Defile (ITA)	December 15, 1994 (aged 18)
Jasmine Dotti (ITA)	July 11, 1993 (aged 19)

Rider	Date of birth
Isabella Ferrari (ITA)	November 3, 1994 (aged 18)
Marina Lari (ITA)	June 5, 1989 (aged 23)
Emma Marcelli (ITA)	December 28, 1985 (aged 27)
Giorgia Nanni (ITA)	May 15, 1994 (aged 18)
Roberta Tasca (ITA)	October 31, 1994 (aged 18)

=== Specialized–lululemon ===
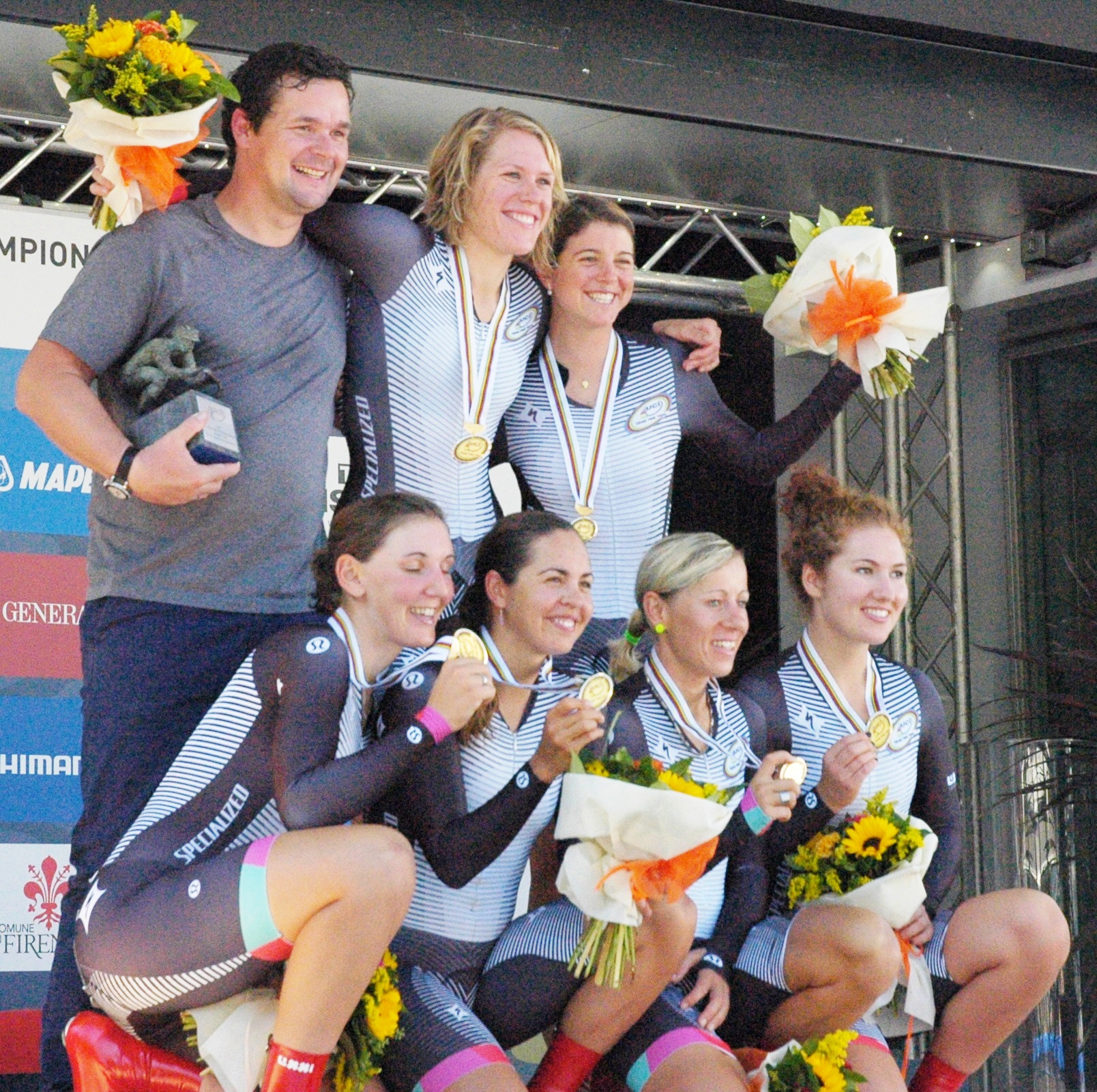
The team at the 2013 UCI Road World Championships

As of 1 January 2013. Ages as of 1 January 2013.

Rider	Date of birth
Lisa Brennauer (GER)	June 8, 1988 (aged 24)
Gillian Carleton (CAN)	December 3, 1989 (aged 23)
Katie Colclough (GBR)	January 20, 1990 (aged 22)
Ellen van Dijk (NED)	February 11, 1987 (aged 25)
Loren Rowney (AUS)	October 14, 1988 (aged 24)
Carmen Small (USA)	April 20, 1980 (aged 32)

Rider	Date of birth
Ally Stacher (USA)	June 8, 1987 (aged 25)
Evelyn Stevens (USA)	May 9, 1983 (aged 29)
Ina-Yoko Teutenberg (GER)	October 28, 1974 (aged 38)
Tayler Wiles (USA)	July 20, 1989 (aged 23)
Trixi Worrack (GER)	September 28, 1981 (aged 31)

=== Squadra Scappatella ===
Ages as of 1 January 2013.

Rider	Date of birth
Victoria Domitner (AUT)	October 18, 1994 (aged 18)
Daniela Gass (GER)	5 November 1980 (age 45)
Julia Hilber (AUT)	18 September 1994 (age 32)
Mónika Király (HUN)	November 10, 1983 (aged 29)
Miriam Kircher (AUT)	24 February 1992 (age 34)
Christina Perchtold (AUT)	11 May 1993 (age 33)
Daniela Pintarelli (AUT)	10 November 1983 (age 42)

Rider	Date of birth
Larissa Ratkic (AUT)	30 January 1994 (age 32)
Elisabeth Reiner (AUT)	September 21, 1983 (aged 29)
Iris Riepan (AUT)	10 April 1990 (age 36)
Sarah Rijkes (AUT)	April 2, 1991 (aged 21)
Claudia Schlager (AUT)	13 March 1968 (age 58)
Barbara Tesar (AUT)	2 March 1982 (age 44)

=== Team Argos–Shimano ===
Ages as of 1 January 2013.

Rider	Date of birth
Charlotte Becker (Note: Becker left the team on 25 May.) (GER)	19 May 1983 (aged 29)
Lucy Garner (GBR)	20 September 1994 (aged 18)
Elke Gebhardt (GER)	22 July 1983 (aged 29)
Marlen Jörend (Note: Jörend left the team on 29 May.) (GER)	1 February 1986 (aged 26)
Janneke Kanis (NED)	15 February 1985 (aged 27)
Willeke Knol (NED)	4 October 1991 (aged 21)

Rider	Date of birth
Kelly Markus (NED)	2 July 1993 (aged 19)
Amy Pieters (NED)	1 June 1991 (aged 21)
Esra Tromp (NED)	15 October 1990 (aged 22)
Kirsten Wild (NED)	15 October 1982 (aged 30)
Floortje Mackaij (Note: Mackaij joined the team on 1 August as a stagiaire.) (NED)	18 October 1995 (aged 17)

=== Team Futurumshop.nl ===
Ages as of 1 January 2013.

Rider	Date of birth
Karen Elzing (NED)	May 14, 1993 (aged 19)
Alie Gercama (NED)	May 27, 1990 (aged 22)
Sarah-Lena Hofmann (GER)	April 24, 1992 (aged 20)
Anouska Koster (NED)	August 20, 1993 (aged 19)
Mieke Kröger (GER)	July 18, 1993 (aged 19)
Lise Olivier (RSA)	May 30, 1983 (aged 29)
Mascha Pijnenborg (NED)	June 30, 1981 (aged 31)

Rider	Date of birth
Stephanie Pohl (GER)	October 21, 1987 (aged 25)
Sarah Roy (AUS)	February 27, 1987 (aged 25)
Laura van der Kamp (NED)	July 24, 1992 (aged 20)
Janine van der Meer (NED)	February 17, 1994 (aged 18)
Aurore Verhoeven (FRA)	January 15, 1990 (aged 22)
Mirthe Wagenaar (NED)	July 30, 1987 (aged 25)

=== Team Pratomagno Women ===
Ages as of 1 January 2013.

Rider	Date of birth
Sandra Gomez (COL)	December 30, 1971 (aged 41)
Svetlana Stolbova (RUS)	January 2, 1973 (aged 39)
Irina Molicheva (RUS)	November 12, 1988 (aged 24)
Natalia Boyarskaya (RUS)	February 27, 1983 (aged 29)
Maribel Gonzales (GUA)	March 31, 1992 (aged 20)
Lidia Draghi (ITA)	August 22, 1993 (aged 19)
Béatrice Godart (LUX)	May 1, 1989 (aged 23)

Rider	Date of birth
Suzie Godart (LUX)	July 20, 1962 (aged 50)
Svetlana Isaeva (UZB)	April 5, 1969 (aged 43)
Olga Drobysheva (UZB)	December 21, 1984 (aged 28)
Kamila Jdanova (UZB)	December 22, 1994 (aged 18)
Alexandra Okhvat (UZB)	June 24, 1994 (aged 18)
Marsela Morales (PUR)	July 6, 1992 (aged 20)
Niknaz Fazeli (IRI)	January 22, 1989 (aged 23)

=== Team TIBCO–To The Top ===
As of January 2013.

Rider	Date of birth
Victoria Bastide (SWE)
Rushlee Buchanan (NZL)	January 20, 1988 (age 38)
Sarah Caravella (USA)	May 31, 1979 (age 47)
Lauren Franges (USA)	October 26, 1983 (age 43)
Claudia Häusler (GER)	November 17, 1985 (age 40)

Rider	Date of birth
Rachel Heal (GBR)	April 1, 1973 (age 53)
Helen Kelly (AUS)	August 7, 1971 (age 55)
Brooke Miller (USA)	March 21, 1976 (age 50)
Amber Rais (USA)	March 25, 1983 (age 43)

=== Top Girls Fassa Bortolo ===
Ages as of 1 January 2013.

Rider	Date of birth
Elena Berlato (ITA)	August 2, 1988 (aged 24)
Irene Bitto (ITA)	November 2, 1993 (aged 19)
Francesca Cauz (ITA)	September 24, 1992 (aged 20)
Silvia Cecchini (ITA)	October 5, 1994 (aged 18)
Jennifer Fiori (ITA)	March 23, 1986 (aged 26)

Rider	Date of birth
Asja Paladin (ITA)	September 27, 1994 (aged 18)
Chiara Pierobon (ITA)	January 21, 1993 (aged 19)
Francesca Stefani (ITA)	January 25, 1991 (aged 21)
Elena Valentini (ITA)	March 30, 1992 (aged 20)

=== Topsport Vlaanderen–Bioracer ===
Ages as of 1 January 2013.

Rider	Date of birth
Els Belmans (BEL)	March 30, 1983 (aged 29)
Ine Beyen (BEL)	May 1, 1987 (aged 25)
Gilke Croket (BEL)	November 1, 1992 (aged 20)
Nel De Crits (BEL)	April 9, 1991 (aged 21)
Stephanie De Croock (BEL)	April 3, 1979 (aged 33)
Tessa De Moyer (BEL)	February 10, 1992 (aged 20)

Rider	Date of birth
Eline De Roover (BEL)	April 4, 1992 (aged 20)
Jessy Druyts (BEL)	January 22, 1994 (aged 18)
Kelly Druyts (BEL)	October 21, 1989 (aged 23)
Rotem Gafinovitz (ISR)	June 9, 1992 (aged 20)
Anisha Vekemans (BEL)	August 17, 1991 (aged 21)

=== Vaiano Fondriest ===
Ages as of 1 January 2013.

Rider	Date of birth
Alyona Andruk (UKR)	June 11, 1987 (aged 25)
Valentina Bastianelli (ITA)	December 4, 1987 (aged 25)
Alessandra D'Ettorre (ITA)	May 8, 1978 (aged 34)
Barbara Guarischi (ITA)	October 2, 1990 (aged 22)
Sérika Gulumá Ortiz (COL)	July 16, 1990 (aged 22)

Rider	Date of birth
Alessia Martini (ITA)	January 10, 1992 (aged 20)
Aleksandra Sošenko (LTU)	January 15, 1991 (aged 21)
Kataržina Sosna (LTU)	November 30, 1990 (aged 22)
Anna Trevisi (ITA)	May 8, 1992 (aged 20)
Chiara Vannucci (ITA)	October 25, 1993 (aged 19)

=== Vienne Futuroscope ===
Ages as of 1 January 2013.

Rider	Date of birth
Jessica Allen (AUS)	April 17, 1993 (aged 19)
Sandrine Bideau (FRA)	April 12, 1989 (aged 23)
Karol-Ann Canuel (CAN)	April 18, 1988 (aged 24)
Oriane Chaumet (FRA)	September 16, 1993 (aged 19)
Audrey Cordon (FRA)	September 22, 1989 (aged 23)
Fiona Dutriaux (FRA)	January 25, 1989 (aged 23)

Rider	Date of birth
Pascale Jeuland (FRA)	June 2, 1987 (aged 25)
Jenifer Letue (FRA)	June 2, 1990 (aged 22)
Emmanuelle Merlot (FRA)	January 10, 1986 (aged 26)
Amélie Rivat (FRA)	November 14, 1989 (aged 23)
Manon Souyris (FRA)	June 30, 1993 (aged 19)

=== Wiggle–Honda ===
As of 1 June 2013.

Rider	Date of birth
Elinor Barker (GBR)	7 September 1994 (age 32)
Beatrice Bartelloni (ITA)	5 February 1993 (age 33)
Charlotte Becker (GER)	19 May 1983 (age 43)
Giorgia Bronzini (ITA)	3 August 1983 (age 43)
Emily Collins (NZL)	16 September 1990 (age 36)
Rochelle Gilmore (AUS)	14 December 1981 (age 44)
Dani King (GBR)	21 November 1990 (age 35)

Rider	Date of birth
Lauren Kitchen (AUS)	21 November 1990 (age 35)
Mayuko Hagiwara (JPN)	16 October 1986 (age 40)
Amy Roberts (GBR)	24 December 1994 (age 31)
Joanna Rowsell (GBR)	5 December 1988 (age 37)
Anna-Bianca Schnitzmeier (GER)	27 July 1990 (age 36)
Laura Trott (GBR)	24 April 1992 (age 34)
Linda Villumsen (NZL)	9 April 1985 (age 41)

Preceded by 2012	List of UCI Women's Teams; 2013	Succeeded by 2014
