= List of 2012 UCI Women's Teams and riders =

Listed below are the UCI Women's Teams that competed in road bicycle racing events organized by the International Cycling Union (UCI), including the UCI Women's Road World Cup in 2012.

== Teams overview ==
The ranking in the table below is decided by the points accumulated by each team's best four riders in the previous season. The organisers of Women's World Cup events are obliged to invite the top 15 teams, and the organisers of Women's UCI class 1 events must invite the top 10 teams.

The country designation of each team is determined by the country of registration of the largest number of its riders, and is not necessarily the country where the team is registered or based.

Rank	Code	Official Team Name	Country	Website
1	RBW	Rabobank Women Cycling Team (2012 season)	Netherlands	rabosport.com
2	SLU	Team Specialized–lululemon (2012 season)	Germany	velociosports.com
3	LNL	AA Drink–leontien.nl Cycling Team (2012 season)	Netherlands	aacyclingteam.nl
4	GEW	GreenEDGE–AIS	Australia	greenedgecycling.com
5	HPU	Hitec Products–Mistral Home Cycling Team	Norway	hitecproducts-uck.no
6	DPZ	Diadora–Pasta Zara	Italy	diadorapastazara.com
7	BPK	Be Pink	Italy	bepink.eu
8	FHT	Faren Honda Team	Italy	farenhonda.com
9	RVL	RusVelo	Russia	rusveloteam.com
10	LBL	Lotto–Belisol Ladies	Belgium	lottobelisol.be/en/ladies-team-10.htm
11	DLT	Dolmans–Boels cyclingteam	Netherlands	dolmanslandscapingteam.nl
12	MCG	MCipollini–Giambenini	Italy	mcipollinigiordanateam.com
13	SKI	Team Skil–Argos (2012 season)	Netherlands	1t4i.com
14	VAI	Vaiano Tepso	Italy	vcvaiano.com
15	KLT	Kleo Ladies Team	Belgium	
16	TIB	TIBCO–To The Top	United States	teamtibco.com
17	MIC	S.C. Michela Fanini Rox	Italy	michelafanini.com
18	GSD	Team GSD Gestion	France	wix.com/teamgsdgestion/teamgsdgestion
19	EXG	Exergy TWENTY12	United States	teamtwenty12.com/
20	FUT	Vienne Futuroscope	France	cyclisme-vienne-futuroscope.com
21	NXX	ABUS–Nutrixxion	Germany	team-nutrixxion.com
22	BPD	Bizkaia–Durango	Spain	duranguesa.com
23	TOG	Fassa Bortolo–Servetto	Italy	gstopgirls.com
24	ATT	Axman Team Taiwan	Chinese Taipei	ctcvelo.blogspot.com
25	VLL	Topsport Vlaanderen–Ridley	Belgium	cyclingteam-damesvlaanderen.be
26	FCL	Forno d'Asolo Colavita	Italy	chiriofornodasolo.it/
27	LKT	Lointek	Spain	equipociclistaugeraga.com
28	SLT	Sengers Ladies Cycling Team (2012 season)	Belgium	sengerslct.be
29	DPD	Team Ibis Cycles (2012 season)	United Kingdom	team-ibis-cycles.com
30	BIZ	Team Bizhub–FCF	South Africa	
31	BCF	ASPTT Dijon–Bourgogne	France	
32	GPC	China Chongming–Giant Pro Cycling	Hong Kong	cycling-sports.com
33	AGG	Alriksson–Go:Green	Sweden	alrikssongogreen.com
34	KSK	Scappa Speed Queens	Austria	kuota.at/kuota-speed-kueens-pid683
35	GCV	Verinlegno–Fabiani	Italy	giusfrediciclismo.it
36	DEB	Debabarrena–Gipuzkoa	Spain	

== Riders ==
=== AA Drink–leontien.nl Cycling Team ===
The 2012 women's road racing team included six riders who were formerly members of the disbanded Garmin–Cervélo women's team: British cyclists Emma Pooley, Lizzie Armitstead, Sharon Laws and Lucy Martin, Belgian Jessie Daams and Australian Carla Ryan. Ages as of 1 January 2012.

Rider	Date of birth
Lizzie Armitstead (GBR)	18 December 1988 (aged 23)
Chantal Blaak (NED)	22 October 1989 (aged 22)
Lucinda Brand (NED)	2 July 1989 (aged 22)
Jessie Daams (BEL)	28 May 1990 (aged 21)
Marijn de Vries (NED)	19 November 1978 (aged 33)
Sharon Laws (GBR)	7 July 1974 (aged 37)
Lucy Martin (GBR)	5 May 1990 (aged 21)
Shelley Olds (USA)	30 September 1980 (aged 31)

Rider	Date of birth
Madelene Olsson (SWE)	14 November 1982 (aged 29)
Emma Pooley (GBR)	3 October 1982 (aged 29)
Carla Ryan (AUS)	21 September 1985 (aged 26)
Isabelle Söderberg (SWE)	28 May 1989 (aged 22)
Marieke van Nek (NED)	14 November 1988 (aged 23)
Marieke van Wanroij (NED)	5 July 1979 (aged 32)
Kirsten Wild (NED)	15 October 1982 (aged 29)

=== ABUS–Nutrixxion ===
Ages as of 1 January 2012.

Rider	Date of birth
Fabienne Schauss (LUX)	September 1, 1984 (aged 27)
Yvonne Fiedler (GER)	November 15, 1986 (aged 25)
Anna-Bianca Schnitzmeier (GER)	July 27, 1990 (aged 21)
Daniela Gass (GER)	November 5, 1980 (aged 31)
Marlen Jöhrend (GER)	January 2, 1986 (aged 25)
Emma Mackie (AUS)	September 9, 1984 (aged 27)
Belinda Goss (AUS)	January 6, 1984 (aged 27)

Rider	Date of birth
Mirjam Muckenhuber (AUT)	October 14, 1985 (aged 26)
Elisabeth Reiner (AUT)	September 21, 1983 (aged 28)
Lisa Lengauer (AUT)	July 20, 1991 (aged 20)
Lisa-Maria Wiedemann (GER)	January 20, 1992 (aged 19)
Svenja Kehl (GER)	January 27, 1990 (aged 21)
Rachel Neylan (AUS)	March 9, 1982 (aged 29)

=== Alriksson–Go:Green ===
Ages as of 1 January 2012.

Rider	Date of birth
Linea Fredäng (SWE)	November 20, 1982 (aged 29)
Madeleine Jacobsson (SWE)	May 10, 1987 (aged 24)
Marie Kallfeldt (SWE)	February 4, 1988 (aged 23)
Jessica Kihlbom (SWE)	June 11, 1989 (aged 22)

Rider	Date of birth
Hanna Nilsson (SWE)	February 16, 1992 (aged 19)
Malin Rydlund (SWE)	May 3, 1977 (aged 34)
Beata Sandström (SWE)	August 15, 1987 (aged 24)
Linnea Sjöblom (SWE)	November 12, 1989 (aged 22)

=== ASPTT Dijon–Bourgogne ===
Ages as of 1 January 2012.

Rider	Date of birth
Aurélie Bramante (FRA)	May 10, 1984 (aged 27)
Emma Crum (NZL)	January 28, 1989 (aged 22)
Magdalena De Saint (FRA)	January 17, 1970 (aged 41)
Joanne Duval (FRA)	October 27, 1988 (aged 23)
Lisa Fabien (FRA)	September 28, 1993 (aged 18)
Sylvie Gaillon (FRA)	August 17, 1972 (aged 39)
Alexia Muffat (FRA)	November 15, 1992 (aged 19)

Rider	Date of birth
Oriane Niay (FRA)	September 29, 1989 (aged 22)
Céline Ondet (FRA)	June 18, 1991 (aged 20)
Béatrice Thomas (FRA)	July 7, 1981 (aged 30)
Claire Thomas (GBR)	December 9, 1972 (aged 39)
Alexandra Tondeur (BEL)	March 20, 1987 (aged 24)
Genevieve Whitson (NZL)	May 9, 1980 (aged 31)

=== Axman Team Taiwan ===
Ages as of 1 January 2012.

Rider	Date of birth
Mei Yu Hsiao (TPE)	January 7, 1985 (aged 26)
Ho Hsun Huang (TPE)	July 26, 1980 (aged 31)
Hsiao Chia Tseng (TPE)	June 21, 1987 (aged 24)
Yu Hsuan Lee (TPE)	April 12, 1989 (aged 22)
Shih-Hsuan Cheng (TPE)	November 12, 1985 (aged 26)

Rider	Date of birth
Wen Chen Tsai (TPE)	November 2, 1991 (aged 20)
Yi Chun Lin (TPE)	December 1, 1989 (aged 22)
Chia Hui Lin (TPE)	January 16, 1992 (aged 19)
Chia Wen Chiang (TPE)	January 21, 1990 (aged 21)

=== Be Pink ===
Ages as of 1 January 2012.

Rider	Date of birth
Alice Algisi (ITA)	March 10, 1993 (aged 18)
Alena Amialiusik (BLR)	February 6, 1989 (aged 22)
Noemi Cantele (ITA)	July 17, 1981 (aged 30)
Giulia Donato (ITA)	September 26, 1992 (aged 19)
Chiara Favaron Bissoli (ITA)	September 16, 1992 (aged 19)
Simona Frapporti (ITA)	July 14, 1988 (aged 23)
Evelyn García (ESA)	December 29, 1982 (aged 29)
Oxana Kozonchuk (RUS)	May 28, 1988 (aged 23)

Rider	Date of birth
Yuliya Martisova (RUS)	June 15, 1976 (aged 35)
Dalia Muccioli (ITA)	May 22, 1993 (aged 18)
Gloria Presti (ITA)	September 29, 1989 (aged 22)
Silvia Valsecchi (ITA)	July 19, 1982 (aged 29)
Petra Zrimšek (SLO)	May 19, 1988 (aged 23)
Rimma Luchshenko (trainees) (KAZ)	April 29, 1993 (aged 18)
Elke Gebhardt (GER)	July 22, 1983 (aged 28)

=== Bizkaia–Durango ===
Ages as of 1 January 2012.

Rider	Date of birth
Cristina Alcalde Huertanos (ESP)	March 3, 1980 (aged 31)
Lilibeth Chacón García (VEN)	March 1, 1992 (aged 19)
Ruth Corset (AUS)	May 9, 1977 (aged 34)
Dorleta Eskamendi Gil (ESP)	January 2, 1992 (aged 19)
Andrea Fraile (ESP)	January 2, 1993 (aged 18)
Leticia Galan (ESP)	November 23, 1990 (aged 21)
Joanne Hogan (AUS)	June 9, 1982 (aged 29)
Bianca Martin Ortega (ESP)	December 19, 1992 (aged 19)
Amaia Martioda (ESP)	May 12, 1990 (aged 21)

Rider	Date of birth
Paola Muñoz (CHI)	April 13, 1986 (aged 25)
Catalina Rayo Ramis (ESP)	August 18, 1990 (aged 21)
Anna Sanchis Chafer (ESP)	October 18, 1987 (aged 24)
Ane Santesteban Gonzalez (ESP)	December 12, 1990 (aged 21)
Davina Summers (AUS)	June 3, 1979 (aged 32)
Laura Vilanova Figueruelo (ESP)	October 22, 1992 (aged 19)
Dorleta Zorrilla Braceras (ESP)	May 25, 1989 (aged 22)
Gloria Rodríguez Sánchez (ESP)	March 6, 1992 (aged 19)

=== China Chongming–Giant Pro Cycling ===
Ages as of 1 January 2012.

Rider	Date of birth
Chen Li (CHN)	January 20, 1987 (aged 24)
Gao Min (CHN)	January 26, 1982 (aged 29)
Huang Dongyan (CHN)	December 14, 1993 (aged 18)
Huang Li (CHN)	December 23, 1988 (aged 23)
Liu Xiao Hui (CHN)	August 5, 1989 (aged 22)
Liu Xin (CHN)	November 5, 1986 (aged 25)
Luo Xiaoling (CHN)	September 20, 1988 (aged 23)
Meng Lang (CHN)	March 6, 1984 (aged 27)

Rider	Date of birth
Shen Fan Li (CHN)	July 15, 1991 (aged 20)
Sheng Yongyan (CHN)	September 5, 1987 (aged 24)
Shi Lina (CHN)	January 12, 1991 (aged 20)
Tang Kerong (CHN)	May 7, 1988 (aged 23)
Wang Cui (CHN)	October 15, 1989 (aged 22)
Wong Wan Yiu Jamie (HKG)	November 4, 1986 (aged 25)
Wu Chao Mei (CHN)	August 11, 1989 (aged 22)
Zhao Na (CHN)	April 29, 1984 (aged 27)

=== Debabarrena–Gipuzkoa ===
Ages as of 1 January 2012.

Rider	Date of birth
Irene San Sebastian Lasa (ESP)	February 21, 1990 (aged 21)
Izaro Lasa (ESP)	May 8, 1987 (aged 24)
Mireia Osa (ESP)	January 19, 1991 (aged 20)
Inmaculada Pereiro (ESP)	October 26, 1972 (aged 39)
Itsaso Leunda Coni (ESP)	March 3, 1984 (aged 27)
Débora Gálves Lopez (ESP)	May 17, 1985 (aged 26)

Rider	Date of birth
Inma Rafael Salas (ESP)	January 5, 1976 (aged 35)
Ludivine Emile Loze (FRA)	August 25, 1984 (aged 27)
Ane Ciaran (ESP)	July 25, 1991 (aged 20)
Maider Oteiza (ESP)	June 23, 1988 (aged 23)
Leire Olaberria Dorronsoro (ESP)	February 17, 1977 (aged 34)
Maite Murguia (ESP)	January 14, 1992 (aged 19)

=== Diadora–Pasta Zara ===
Ages as of 1 January 2012.

Rider	Date of birth
Giada Borgato (ITA)	June 15, 1989 (aged 22)
Giorgia Bronzini (ITA)	August 3, 1983 (aged 28)
Rossella Callovi (ITA)	April 5, 1991 (aged 20)
Inga Čilvinaitė (LTU)	February 14, 1986 (aged 25)
Alessandra D'Ettorre (ITA)	May 8, 1978 (aged 33)

Rider	Date of birth
Edita Janeliūnaitė (LTU)	December 16, 1988 (aged 23)
Amber Pierce (USA)	March 25, 1981 (aged 30)
Agnė Šilinytė (LTU)	April 12, 1991 (aged 20)
Francesca Stefani (ITA)	January 25, 1991 (aged 20)
Alice Tagliapietra (ITA)	March 8, 1993 (aged 18)

=== Dolmans–Boels cyclingteam ===
Ages as of 1 January 2012.

Rider	Date of birth
Martine Bras (NED)	May 17, 1978 (aged 33)
Elena Chalykh (Note: Chalykh joined the team on 14 March.) (AZE)	March 25, 1974 (aged 37)
Lieselot Decroix (BEL)	May 12, 1987 (aged 24)
Karen Elzing (NED)	May 14, 1993 (aged 18)
Janneke Ensing (NED)	September 21, 1986 (aged 25)
Alie Gercama (NED)	July 25, 1990 (aged 21)
Nina Kessler (NED)	July 4, 1988 (aged 23)
Anouska Koster (NED)	August 20, 1993 (aged 18)

Rider	Date of birth
Marissa Otten (Note: Otten left the team on 31 May.) (NED)	July 11, 1989 (aged 22)
Mascha Pijnenborg (NED)	June 30, 1981 (aged 30)
Pauliena Rooijakkers (NED)	May 12, 1993 (aged 18)
Winanda Spoor (NED)	January 27, 1991 (aged 20)
Emma Trott (GBR)	December 24, 1989 (aged 22)
Irene van den Broek (NED)	August 26, 1980 (aged 31)
Laura van der Kamp (NED)	July 24, 1992 (aged 19)

=== Exergy TWENTY12 ===
Ages as of 1 January 2012.

Rider	Date of birth
Kaitlin Antonneau (USA)	January 1, 1992 (aged 20)
Kristin Armstrong (USA)	August 11, 1973 (aged 38)
Theresa Cliff-Ryan (USA)	June 19, 1978 (aged 33)
Jacquelyn Crowell (USA)	February 16, 1988 (aged 23)
Andrea Dvorak (USA)	October 9, 1980 (aged 31)
Kristin McGrath (USA)	October 21, 1982 (aged 29)

Rider	Date of birth
Greta Neimanas (USA)	May 4, 1988 (aged 23)
Coryn Rivera (USA)	August 26, 1992 (aged 19)
Rhae-Christie Shaw (CAN)	November 20, 1975 (aged 36)
Alison Tetrick (USA)	April 4, 1985 (aged 26)
Tayler Wiles (USA)	July 20, 1989 (aged 22)

=== Faren Honda Team ===
Ages as of 1 January 2012.

Rider	Date of birth
Giorgia Baraldo (ITA)	May 17, 1993 (aged 18)
Yulia Blindyuk (RUS)	December 11, 1984 (aged 27)
Maria Giulia Confalonieri (ITA)	March 30, 1993 (aged 18)
Nicole Cooke (GBR)	April 13, 1983 (aged 28)
Gracie Elvin (AUS)	October 31, 1988 (aged 23)
Myfanwy Galloway (AUS)	June 22, 1990 (aged 21)
Rochelle Gilmore (AUS)	December 14, 1981 (aged 30)

Rider	Date of birth
Giuseppina Grassi (MEX)	August 29, 1976 (aged 35)
Jennifer Hohl (SUI)	February 3, 1986 (aged 25)
Fabiana Luperini (ITA)	January 14, 1974 (aged 37)
Chiara Nadalutti (ITA)	March 8, 1985 (aged 26)
Luisa Tamanini (ITA)	January 31, 1980 (aged 31)
Elena Utrobina (RUS)	January 1, 1985 (aged 27)
Stefania Vecchio (ITA)	January 6, 1990 (aged 21)

=== Fassa Bortolo–Servetto ===
Ages as of 1 January 2012.

Rider	Date of birth
Elena Berlato (ITA)	August 2, 1988 (aged 23)
Irene Bitto (ITA)	November 2, 1993 (aged 18)
Francesca Cauz (ITA)	September 24, 1992 (aged 19)
Erika Cecchel (ITA)	January 10, 1992 (aged 19)
Jennifer Fiori (ITA)	March 23, 1986 (aged 25)

Rider	Date of birth
Viviana Gatto (ITA)	March 30, 1992 (aged 19)
Barbara Guarischi (ITA)	October 2, 1990 (aged 21)
Soraya Paladin (ITA)	May 4, 1993 (aged 18)
Giulia Ronchi (ITA)	March 6, 1992 (aged 19)
Doris Schweizer (SUI)	August 28, 1989 (aged 22)

=== Forno d'Asolo Colavita ===
Ages as of 1 January 2012.

Rider	Date of birth
Anastasia Chulkova (RUS)	March 7, 1985 (aged 26)
Francesca Faustini (ITA)	December 27, 1988 (aged 23)
Uênia Fernandes de Souza (BRA)	August 12, 1984 (aged 27)
Whitney Gaggioli (USA)	February 13, 1988 (aged 23)
Huda Grairi (ITA)	March 29, 1993 (aged 18)
Silvia Marotta (ITA)	February 25, 1992 (aged 19)
Flávia Oliveira (BRA)	October 27, 1981 (aged 30)

Rider	Date of birth
Svetlana Pauliukaitė (LTU)	July 31, 1985 (aged 26)
Federica Primavera (ITA)	July 3, 1990 (aged 21)
Liza Rachetto (USA)	January 30, 1974 (aged 37)
Tetyana Ryabchenko (UKR)	August 28, 1989 (aged 22)
Sari Saarelainen (FIN)	March 1, 1981 (aged 30)
Patricia Schwager (SUI)	December 6, 1983 (aged 28)
Jessica Uebelhart (SUI)	October 16, 1990 (aged 21)

=== GreenEDGE–AIS ===
Ages as of 1 January 2012.

Rider	Date of birth
Judith Arndt (GER)	July 23, 1976 (aged 35)
Tiffany Cromwell (AUS)	July 6, 1988 (aged 23)
Rowena Fry (AUS)	December 8, 1982 (aged 29)
Shara Gillow (AUS)	December 23, 1987 (aged 24)
Loes Gunnewijk (NED)	November 27, 1980 (aged 31)
Melissa Hoskins (AUS)	February 24, 1991 (aged 20)

Rider	Date of birth
Claudia Lichtenberg (GER)	November 17, 1985 (aged 26)
Jessie MacLean (AUS)	October 17, 1985 (aged 26)
Alexis Rhodes (AUS)	December 1, 1984 (aged 27)
Amanda Spratt (AUS)	September 17, 1987 (aged 24)
Linda Villumsen (NZL)	April 9, 1985 (aged 26)

=== Hitec Products–Mistral Home Cycling Team ===
Ages as of 1 January 2012.

Rider	Date of birth
Johanna Bergseth (NOR)	August 26, 1987 (aged 24)
Christel Ferrier-Bruneau (FRA)	July 8, 1979 (aged 32)
Cecilie Johansen (NOR)	October 2, 1989 (aged 22)
Emma Johansson (SWE)	September 23, 1983 (aged 28)
Cecilie Gotaas Johnsen (NOR)	April 20, 1976 (aged 35)
Sylwia Kapusta (POL)	December 8, 1982 (aged 29)
Tone Hatteland Lima (NOR)	December 18, 1979 (aged 32)

Rider	Date of birth
Elisa Longo Borghini (ITA)	December 10, 1991 (aged 20)
Emilie Moberg (NOR)	July 12, 1991 (aged 20)
Sara Mustonen Lichan (SWE)	February 8, 1981 (aged 30)
Lise Nøstvold (NOR)	February 14, 1987 (aged 24)
Thea Thorsen (NOR)	March 15, 1992 (aged 19)
Marie Voreland (NOR)	September 20, 1990 (aged 21)
Fröydis Waersted (NOR)	June 15, 1987 (aged 24)

=== Kleo Ladies Team ===
Ages as of 1 January 2012.

Rider	Date of birth
Anne Arnouts (BEL)	October 17, 1989 (aged 22)
Evelyn Arys (BEL)	July 21, 1990 (aged 21)
Martina Corazza (ITA)	June 8, 1979 (aged 32)
Annalisa Cucinotta (ITA)	March 4, 1986 (aged 25)
Petra Dijkman (NED)	November 13, 1979 (aged 32)

Rider	Date of birth
Nathalie Lamborelle (LUX)	February 1, 1988 (aged 23)
Marie Lindberg (SWE)	August 14, 1987 (aged 24)
Annelies Van Doorslaer (BEL)	January 15, 1989 (aged 22)
Grace Verbeke (BEL)	November 12, 1984 (aged 27)

=== Lointek ===
Ages as of 1 January 2012.

Rider	Date of birth
Emilie Blanquefort (FRA)	May 6, 1988 (aged 23)
Maria del Mar Bonnin Palou (ESP)	May 12, 1990 (aged 21)
Mireia Epelde Bikendi (ESP)	October 29, 1985 (aged 26)
Mathilde Favre (FRA)	September 15, 1993 (aged 18)
Arantxa Garcia Morte (ESP)	August 16, 1990 (aged 21)
Lucía González Blanco (ESP)	July 9, 1990 (aged 21)
Yulia Ilinykh (RUS)	October 6, 1985 (aged 26)

Rider	Date of birth
Eneritz Iturriagaechevarria Mazaga (ESP)	September 17, 1980 (aged 31)
Belén López Morales (ESP)	April 18, 1984 (aged 27)
Margot Ortega (FRA)	February 20, 1990 (aged 21)
Anna Potokina (RUS)	June 18, 1987 (aged 24)
Fanny Riberot (FRA)	March 17, 1983 (aged 28)
Ana Usabiaga Balerdi (ESP)	January 19, 1990 (aged 21)
Irene Usabiaga Balerdi (ESP)	September 22, 1993 (aged 18)

=== Lotto–Belisol Ladies ===
Ages as of 1 January 2012.

Rider	Date of birth
Bo Carless (BEL)	July 23, 1993 (aged 19)
Robyn de Groot (RSA)	December 26, 1982 (aged 30)
Sofie De Vuyst (BEL)	April 2, 1987 (aged 25)
Ann-Sophie Duyck (BEL)	July 23, 1987 (aged 25)
Joline Goossens (BEL)	June 18, 1985 (aged 27)
Kaat Hannes (BEL)	November 21, 1991 (aged 21)
Ludivine Henrion (BEL)	January 23, 1984 (aged 28)
An-Li Kachelhoffer (RSA)	August 16, 1987 (aged 25)

Rider	Date of birth
Ashleigh Moolman-Pasio (RSA)	December 9, 1985 (aged 27)
Lise Olivier (RSA)	May 30, 1983 (aged 29)
Kim Schoonbaert (BEL)	March 2, 1986 (aged 26)
Cherise Taylor (RSA)	November 6, 1989 (aged 23)
Joanna van de Winkel (RSA)	April 22, 1982 (aged 30)
Katrien Van Looy (BEL)	June 19, 1989 (aged 23)
Nathalie Nijns (Cyclo-cross specialist) (BEL)	July 1, 1993 (aged 19)

=== MCipollini–Giambenini ===
Ages as of 1 January 2012.

Rider	Date of birth
Monia Baccaille (ITA)	April 10, 1984 (aged 27)
Marta Bastianelli (ITA)	April 30, 1987 (aged 24)
Alessandra Borchi (ITA)	August 15, 1983 (aged 28)
Valentina Carretta (ITA)	September 16, 1989 (aged 22)
Elena Cecchini (ITA)	May 25, 1992 (aged 19)
Tatiana Guderzo (ITA)	August 22, 1984 (aged 27)

Rider	Date of birth
Małgorzata Jasińska (POL)	January 18, 1984 (aged 27)
Giulia Pironato (ITA)	June 2, 1993 (aged 18)
Marta Tagliaferro (ITA)	November 4, 1989 (aged 22)
Alessandra Tomasini (ITA)	September 6, 1993 (aged 18)
Elena Valentini (ITA)	March 30, 1992 (aged 19)
Susanna Zorzi (ITA)	March 13, 1992 (aged 19)

=== Rabobank Women Cycling Team ===
Ages as of 1 January 2012.

Rider	Date of birth
Tatiana Antoshina (RUS)	July 27, 1982 (aged 30)
Liesbet De Vocht (BEL)	January 5, 1979 (aged 33)
Sarah Düster (GER)	July 10, 1982 (aged 30)
Pauline Ferrand-Prévot (FRA)	February 10, 1992 (aged 20)
Thalita de Jong (NED)	November 6, 1993 (aged 19)
Lauren Kitchen (NOR)	November 21, 1990 (aged 22)
Roxane Knetemann (NED)	April 1, 1987 (aged 25)

Rider	Date of birth
Iris Slappendel (NED)	February 18, 1985 (aged 27)
Sabrina Stultiens (NED)	July 8, 1993 (aged 19)
Rebecca Talen (NED)	October 27, 1993 (aged 19)
Monique van der Vorst (NED)	November 20, 1984 (aged 28)
Sanne van Paassen (NED)	October 27, 1988 (aged 24)
Annemiek van Vleuten (NED)	October 8, 1982 (aged 30)
Marianne Vos (NED)	May 13, 1987 (aged 25)

=== RusVelo ===
Ages as of 1 January 2012.

Rider	Date of birth
Venera Absalyamova (RUS)	April 11, 1986 (aged 25)
Alina Bondarenko (RUS)	January 14, 1993 (aged 18)
Natalia Boyarskaya (RUS)	February 27, 1983 (aged 28)
Laura Fouquet (GER)	September 16, 1991 (aged 20)
Alexandra Goncharova (RUS)	October 26, 1992 (aged 19)
Romy Kasper (GER)	May 5, 1988 (aged 23)
Victoria Kondel (RUS)	October 6, 1987 (aged 24)

Rider	Date of birth
Hanka Kupfernagel (GER)	March 19, 1974 (aged 37)
Elena Lichmanova (RUS)	January 10, 1991 (aged 20)
Lidia Malakhova (RUS)	July 13, 1991 (aged 20)
Irina Molicheva (RUS)	November 12, 1988 (aged 23)
Evgenia Romanyuta (RUS)	January 22, 1988 (aged 23)
Svetlana Stolbova (RUS)	January 2, 1973 (aged 38)
Olga Zabelinskaya (RUS)	May 10, 1980 (aged 31)

=== S.C. Michela Fanini Rox ===
Ages as of 1 January 2012.

Rider	Date of birth
Alexandra Burchenkova (RUS)	September 16, 1988 (aged 23)
Lorena Foresi (ITA)	April 11, 1988 (aged 23)
Sara Grifi (ITA)	September 26, 1988 (aged 23)
Verónica Leal Balderas (MEX)	October 15, 1977 (aged 34)
Silvia Marsala (ITA)	June 19, 1993 (aged 18)
Ella Michal (ISR)	July 24, 1987 (aged 24)

Rider	Date of birth
Vanessa Elettra Ricci (ITA)	February 4, 1989 (aged 22)
Martina Růžičková (CZE)	March 22, 1980 (aged 31)
Azucena Sánchez Benito (ESP)	October 15, 1978 (aged 33)
Valentina Scandolara (ITA)	May 1, 1990 (aged 21)
Grete Treier (EST)	December 12, 1977 (aged 34)

=== Scappa Speed Queens ===
Ages as of 1 January 2012.

Rider	Date of birth
Jacqueline Hahn (AUT)	July 21, 1991 (aged 20)
Miriam Kircher (AUT)	January 24, 1992 (aged 19)
Christina Kollmann (AUT)	March 14, 1988 (aged 23)
Christina Perchtold (AUT)	May 11, 1993 (aged 18)
Daniela Pintarelli (AUT)	November 10, 1983 (aged 28)

Rider	Date of birth
Lisa Pleyer (AUT)	December 4, 1978 (aged 33)
Iris Riepan (AUT)	April 10, 1990 (aged 21)
Claudia Schlager (AUT)	March 13, 1968 (aged 43)
Bettina Barbara Tesar (AUT)	March 2, 1982 (aged 29)

=== Sengers Ladies Cycling Team ===
Ages as of 1 January 2012.

Rider	Date of birth
Anna van der Breggen (NED)	April 18, 1990 (aged 22)
Kimberly Buyl (BEL)	September 11, 1988 (aged 24)
Sofie De Nys (BEL)	November 3, 1985 (aged 27)
Eline De Roover (BEL)	April 4, 1992 (aged 20)
Eveline Dergent (BEL)	June 22, 1992 (aged 20)
Claudia Koster (NED)	March 22, 1992 (aged 20)
Birgit Lavrijssen (NED)	January 16, 1991 (aged 21)
Sofie Leemans (BEL)	January 27, 1992 (aged 20)

Rider	Date of birth
Anouk Rockx (NED)	January 2, 1992 (aged 20)
Inge Roggeman (BEL)	April 13, 1981 (aged 31)
Geerike Schreurs (NED)	May 19, 1989 (aged 23)
Emma Silversides (GBR)	October 2, 1978 (aged 34)
Céline Van Severen (BEL)	September 17, 1993 (aged 19)
Cindy Vandermeulen (BEL)	December 15, 1980 (aged 32)
Karen Verhestraeten (BEL)	April 23, 1991 (aged 21)
Vera Koedooder (NED)	October 31, 1983 (aged 29)

=== Team Bizhub–FCF ===
Ages as of 1 January 2012.

Rider	Date of birth
Lilandi Swanepoel (GBR)	July 22, 1992 (aged 19)
Leana De Jager (RSA)	December 22, 1981 (aged 30)
Yolandi Du Toit (RSA)	June 3, 1985 (aged 26)
Nicci Grobler (RSA)	April 14, 1989 (aged 22)
Catherine Hare Willianson (GBR)	March 13, 1982 (aged 29)

Rider	Date of birth
Linn Torp (NOR)	April 22, 1977 (aged 34)
Hanlie Hattingh (RSA)	September 11, 1989 (aged 22)
Karen Dryer (RSA)	June 27, 1989 (aged 22)
Claudine Janse Van Rensburg (RSA)	October 26, 1989 (aged 22)

=== Team GSD Gestion ===
Ages as of 1 January 2012.

Rider	Date of birth
Christine Majerus (LUX)	February 25, 1987 (aged 24)
Emilie Aubry (SUI)	February 16, 1989 (aged 22)
Lucie Pader (FRA)	December 21, 1992 (aged 19)
Lina-Kristin Schink (GER)	November 5, 1983 (aged 28)

Rider	Date of birth
Eugenie Mermillod (FRA)	May 27, 1986 (aged 25)
Anne-Marie Schmitt (LUX)	January 23, 1989 (aged 22)
Oriane Chaumet (FRA)	September 16, 1993 (aged 18)
Siobhan Horgan (IRL)	December 22, 1978 (aged 33)

=== Team Ibis Cycles ===
Ages as of 1 January 2012.

Rider	Date of birth
Hannah Barnes (GBR)	4 May 1993 (aged 18)
Jane Barr (GBR)	24 November 1981 (aged 30)
Kayleigh Brogan (Note: Brogan joined the team on 9 July.) (GBR)	16 January 1992 (aged 19)
Aafke Eshuis (NED)	24 November 1987 (aged 24)
Anne Ewing (GBR)	21 July 1987 (aged 24)
Pippa Handley (Note: Handley left the team on 15 July.) (GBR)	25 August 1978 (aged 33)
Britt Jansen (NED)	5 December 1991 (aged 20)

Rider	Date of birth
Julie Leth (DEN)	13 July 1992 (aged 19)
Esther Olthuis (NED)	16 November 1978 (aged 33)
Eileen Roe (GBR)	24 September 1989 (aged 22)
Martina Thomasson (SWE)	2 February 1985 (aged 26)
Laura Trott (GBR)	24 April 1992 (aged 19)
Natalie van Gogh (NED)	14 September 1974 (aged 37)
Berdienke Paus (Note: Paus was not UCI registered.) (NED)	13 February 1988 (aged 23)

=== Team Skil–Argos ===
Ages as of 1 January 2012.

Rider	Date of birth
Regina Bruins (NED)	7 October 1986 (aged 25)
Suzanne de Goede (NED)	16 April 1984 (aged 27)
Anne de Wildt (NED)	29 October 1989 (aged 22)
Janneke Kanis (NED)	15 February 1985 (aged 26)
Kelly Markus (NED)	7 February 1993 (aged 18)

Rider	Date of birth
Amy Pieters (NED)	1 June 1991 (aged 20)
Esra Tromp (NED)	15 October 1990 (aged 21)
Monique van de Ree (NED)	2 March 1988 (aged 23)
Linda van Rijen (NED)	15 June 1988 (aged 23)
Adrie Visser (NED)	19 October 1983 (aged 28)

=== Team Specialized–lululemon ===
Ages as of 1 January 2012.

Rider	Date of birth
Charlotte Becker (GER)	May 19, 1983 (aged 28)
Lisa Brennauer (GER)	June 8, 1988 (aged 23)
Katie Colclough (GBR)	January 20, 1990 (aged 21)
Ellen van Dijk (NED)	February 11, 1987 (aged 24)
Emilia Fahlin (SWE)	October 24, 1988 (aged 23)
Chloe Hosking (AUS)	October 1, 1990 (aged 21)
Clara Hughes (CAN)	September 27, 1972 (aged 39)

Rider	Date of birth
Amber Neben (USA)	February 18, 1975 (aged 36)
Loren Rowney (AUS)	October 14, 1988 (aged 23)
Ally Stacher (USA)	June 8, 1987 (aged 24)
Evelyn Stevens (USA)	May 9, 1983 (aged 28)
Ina-Yoko Teutenberg (GER)	October 28, 1974 (aged 37)
Trixi Worrack (GER)	September 28, 1981 (aged 30)

=== TIBCO–To The Top ===
Ages as of 1 January 2012.

Rider	Date of birth
Véronique Fortin (CAN)	January 22, 1980 (aged 31)
Megan Guarnier (USA)	May 4, 1985 (aged 26)
Lauren Hall (USA)	February 2, 1979 (aged 32)
Danielle Haulman (USA)	June 5, 1990 (aged 21)
Lauren Hecht (USA)	October 26, 1987 (aged 24)
Joanne Kiesanowski (NZL)	May 24, 1979 (aged 32)
Amanda Miller (USA)	December 13, 1986 (aged 25)
Meredith Miller (USA)	December 26, 1973 (aged 38)

Rider	Date of birth
Lindsay Myers (USA)	November 2, 1989 (aged 22)
Jennifer Purcell (USA)	August 17, 1978 (aged 33)
Heather Ross (USA)	April 13, 1987 (aged 24)
Kendall Ryan (USA)	August 10, 1992 (aged 19)
Samantha Schneider (USA)	September 18, 1990 (aged 21)
Jennifer Wheeler (USA)	September 19, 1980 (aged 31)
Tara Whitten (CAN)	July 13, 1980 (aged 31)

=== Topsport Vlaanderen–Ridley ===
Ages as of 1 January 2012.

Rider	Date of birth
Els Belmans (BEL)	March 30, 1983 (aged 28)
Ine Beyen (BEL)	May 1, 1987 (aged 24)
Latoya Brulee (BEL)	December 9, 1988 (aged 23)
Gilke Croket (BEL)	November 1, 1992 (aged 19)
Jolien D'Hoore (BEL)	March 14, 1990 (aged 21)

Rider	Date of birth
Kelly Druyts (BEL)	October 21, 1989 (aged 22)
Sjoukje Dufoer (BEL)	October 5, 1987 (aged 24)
Maaike Polspoel (BEL)	March 28, 1989 (aged 22)
Edith Van Den Brande (BEL)	January 11, 1982 (aged 29)
Anisha Vekemans (BEL)	August 17, 1991 (aged 20)

=== Vaiano Tepso ===
Ages as of 1 January 2012.

Rider	Date of birth
Alyona Andruk (UKR)	June 11, 1987 (aged 24)
Francesca Anichini (ITA)	January 19, 1992 (aged 19)
Valentina Bastianelli (ITA)	December 4, 1987 (aged 24)
Urtė Juodvalkytė (LTU)	December 23, 1986 (aged 25)
Leleivyte Rasa (LTU)	July 22, 1988 (aged 23)
Alessia Martini (ITA)	January 10, 1992 (aged 19)

Rider	Date of birth
Silvia Moroni (ITA)	January 9, 1992 (aged 19)
Aleksandra Sošenko (LTU)	January 15, 1991 (aged 20)
Kataržina Sosna (LTU)	November 30, 1990 (aged 21)
Eleonora Spaliviero (ITA)	September 7, 1989 (aged 22)
Anna Trevisi (ITA)	May 8, 1992 (aged 19)

=== Verinlegno–Fabiani ===
Ages as of 1 January 2012.

Rider	Date of birth
Veronica Alessio (ITA)	December 12, 1987 (aged 24)
Odette Bertolin (ITA)	February 5, 1983 (aged 28)
Francesca Tognali (ITA)	April 6, 1985 (aged 26)
Rossella Ratto (ITA)	October 20, 1993 (aged 18)
Chiara Vanni (ITA)	July 21, 1989 (aged 22)

Rider	Date of birth
Angela Bravin (ITA)	September 16, 1993 (aged 18)
Lara Vieceli (ITA)	July 16, 1993 (aged 18)
Barbara Venerito (ITA)	September 22, 1993 (aged 18)
Dorota Gregorowicz (POL)	June 29, 1989 (aged 22)
Fleur Faure (FRA)	August 13, 1993 (aged 18)

=== Vienne Futuroscope ===
Ages as of 1 January 2012.

Rider	Date of birth
Marion Azam (FRA)	October 13, 1991 (aged 20)
Julie Beveridge (CAN)	June 30, 1988 (aged 23)
Sandrine Bideau (FRA)	April 12, 1989 (aged 22)
Karol-Ann Canuel (CAN)	April 18, 1988 (aged 23)
Cordon Ragot Audrey (FRA)	September 22, 1989 (aged 22)
Fiona Dutriaux (FRA)	January 25, 1989 (aged 22)
Andrea Graus (AUT)	November 13, 1979 (aged 32)
Aurelie Halbwachs (MRI)	August 24, 1986 (aged 25)

Rider	Date of birth
Pascale Jeuland (FRA)	June 2, 1987 (aged 24)
Jenifer Letue (FRA)	June 2, 1990 (aged 21)
Emmanuelle Merlot (FRA)	January 10, 1986 (aged 25)
Amelie Rivat Mas (FRA)	November 14, 1989 (aged 22)
Marion Rousse (FRA)	August 17, 1991 (aged 20)
Manon Souyris (FRA)	June 30, 1993 (aged 18)
Carlee Taylor (AUS)	February 15, 1989 (aged 22)

Preceded by 2011	List of UCI Women's Teams; 2012	Succeeded by 2013
