= List of 2011 UCI Women's Teams and riders =

Listed below are the UCI Women's Teams that competed in road bicycle racing events organized by the International Cycling Union (UCI) in 2011.

== Teams overview ==
Code	Official Team Name	Country
KSK	Kuota Speed Kueens	Austria
LHT	Lotto–Honda Team	Belgium
VLL	TopSport Vlaanderen 2012–Ridley Team	Belgium
JSD	Juvederm–Specialized	Canada
BPD	Bizkaia–Durango	Spain
DEB	Debabarrena–Gipuzkoa	Spain
LTK	Lointek	Spain
BCF	Asptt Dijon–Bourgogne	France
GSD	Team GSD Gestion	France
FUT	Vienne Futuroscope	France
CWT	Team Garmin–Cervélo	United Kingdom
NXX	Abus–Nutrixxion	Germany
GPC	China Chongming–Giant Pro Cycling	Hong Kong
FCL	Colavita Forno d'Asolo	Italy
GAU	Gauss	Italy
KLT	Kleo Ladies Team	Italy
MIC	S.C. Michela Fanini Rox	Italy
MCG	SC MCipollini–Giordana	Italy
TOG	Top Girls Fassa Bortolo	Italy
VAI	Vaiano Solaristech	Italy
LNL	AA Drink–leontien.nl (2011 season)	Netherlands
DLT	Dolmans Landscaping Team	Netherlands
NLB	Nederland Bloeit	Netherlands
HPU	Hitec Products UCK	Norway
AGG	Alriksson–Go:Green	Sweden
DPZ	Diadora–Pasta Zara	United States
TCW	HTC Highroad Women (2011 season)	United States
TIB	Tibco–To The Top	United States

== Riders ==
All ages as of 1 January 2011.

=== Kuota Speed Kueens ===
Rider	Date of birth
Laura Fouquet (GER)	September 16, 1991 (aged 19)
Jacqueline Hahn (AUT)	July 21, 1991 (aged 19)
Romy Kasper (GER)	May 5, 1988 (aged 22)
Daniela Pintarelli (AUT)	November 10, 1983 (aged 27)
Lisa Pleyer (AUT)	December 4, 1978 (aged 32)

Rider	Date of birth
Bianca Purath (GER)	January 4, 1985 (aged 25)
Claudia Schlager (AUT)	March 13, 1968 (aged 42)
Bernadette Schober (AUT)	July 15, 1984 (aged 26)
Bettina Barbara Tesar (AUT)	March 2, 1982 (aged 28)

=== Lotto–Honda Team ===
Ages as of 1 January 2011.

Rider	Date of birth
Veronica Andrèasson (SWE)	March 6, 1981 (aged 29)
Robyn de Groot (RSA)	December 26, 1982 (aged 28)
Sofie De Vuyst (BEL)	April 2, 1987 (aged 23)
Catherine Delfosse (BEL)	June 11, 1981 (aged 29)
Elise Depoorter (BEL)	February 9, 1988 (aged 22)
Rochelle Gilmore (AUS)	December 14, 1981 (aged 29)
Joline Goossens (BEL)	June 18, 1985 (aged 25)
Ludivine Henrion (BEL)	January 23, 1984 (aged 26)
Ashleigh Moolman-Pasio (RSA)	December 9, 1985 (aged 25)

Rider	Date of birth
Kim Schoonbaert (BEL)	March 2, 1986 (aged 24)
Marissa Stander (RSA)	August 30, 1978 (aged 32)
Cherise Taylor (RSA)	November 6, 1989 (aged 21)
Joanna van de Winkel (RSA)	April 22, 1982 (aged 28)
Laure Werner (BEL)	February 22, 1981 (aged 29)
Vicki Whitelaw (AUS)	January 2, 1977 (aged 33)
Melissa Hoskins (AUS)	February 24, 1991 (aged 19)
Josephine Tomic (AUS)	June 9, 1989 (aged 21)

=== TopSport Vlaanderen 2012–Ridley Team ===
Ages as of 1 January 2011.

Rider	Date of birth
Els Belmans (BEL)	March 30, 1983 (aged 27)
Ine Beyen (BEL)	May 1, 1987 (aged 23)
Latoya Brulee (BEL)	December 9, 1988 (aged 22)
Jolien D'Hoore (BEL)	March 14, 1990 (aged 20)
Liesbet De Vocht (BEL)	January 5, 1979 (aged 31)
Lieselot Decroix (BEL)	May 12, 1987 (aged 23)
Kelly Druyts (BEL)	October 21, 1989 (aged 21)

Rider	Date of birth
Sjoukje Dufoer (BEL)	October 5, 1987 (aged 23)
Kaat Hannes (BEL)	November 21, 1991 (aged 19)
Maaike Polspoel (BEL)	March 28, 1989 (aged 21)
Annelies Van Doorslaer (BEL)	January 15, 1989 (aged 21)
Anisha Vekemans (BEL)	August 17, 1991 (aged 19)
Grace Verbeke (BEL)	November 12, 1984 (aged 26)

=== Juvederm–Specialized ===
Rider	Date of birth
Lex Albrecht (CAN)	April 6, 1987 (aged 23)
Joanie Caron (CAN)	April 27, 1984 (aged 26)
Anne Guzman (CAN)	April 12, 1975 (aged 35)
Krystal Jeffs (CAN)	May 3, 1983 (aged 27)
Veronique Labonte (CAN)	September 15, 1980 (aged 30)
Moriah Macgregor (CAN)	May 11, 1974 (aged 36)

Rider	Date of birth
Denise Ramsden (CAN)	November 21, 1990 (aged 20)
Jenny Trew (CAN)	September 14, 1981 (aged 29)
Mary Zider (USA)	June 25, 1984 (aged 26)
Valerie Crete (CAN)	June 26, 1989 (aged 21)
Véronique Drapeau-Zgoralski (CAN)	March 14, 1992 (aged 18)

=== Bizkaia–Durango ===
Ages as of 1 January 2011.

Rider	Date of birth
Cristina Alcalde Huertanos (ESP)	March 3, 1980 (aged 30)
Polona Batagelj (SLO)	June 7, 1989 (aged 21)
Ruth Corset (AUS)	May 9, 1977 (aged 33)
Leticia Galan (ESP)	November 23, 1990 (aged 20)
Ana Garcia Antequera (ESP)	January 30, 1981 (aged 29)
Shara Gillow (AUS)	December 23, 1987 (aged 23)
Monica Hernandez (MEX)	August 11, 1985 (aged 25)
Rocio Loureda Gonzalez (ESP)	July 25, 1991 (aged 19)

Rider	Date of birth
Bianca Martin Ortega (ESP)	December 19, 1992 (aged 18)
Amaia Martioda (ESP)	May 12, 1990 (aged 20)
Catalina Rayo Ramis (ESP)	August 18, 1990 (aged 20)
Anna Sanchis Chafer (ESP)	October 18, 1987 (aged 23)
Davina Summers (AUS)	June 3, 1979 (aged 31)
Ariadna Tudel Cuberes (AND)	November 17, 1978 (aged 32)
Dorleta Zorrilla Braceras (ESP)	May 25, 1989 (aged 21)

=== Bebabarrena-Gipuzkoa ===
Rider	Date of birth
Dorleta Eskamendi Gil (ESP)	January 2, 1992 (aged 18)
Débora Gálves Lopez (ESP)	May 17, 1985 (aged 25)
Izaro Lasa (ESP)	May 8, 1987 (aged 23)
Eva Ledesma (ESP)	January 22, 1976 (aged 34)
Itsaso Leunda Coni (ESP)	March 3, 1984 (aged 26)
Ludivine Emile Loze (FRA)	August 25, 1984 (aged 26)
Mireia Osa (ESP)	January 19, 1991 (aged 19)

Rider	Date of birth
Inmaculada Pereiro (ESP)	October 26, 1972 (aged 38)
Inma Rafael Salas (ESP)	January 5, 1976 (aged 34)
Rosario Rodriguez Gomez (ESP)	June 11, 1982 (aged 28)
Irene San Sebastián Lasa (ESP)	February 21, 1990 (aged 20)
Ane Santesteban Gonzalez (ESP)	December 12, 1990 (aged 20)
Ana Yonta Diez (ESP)	October 25, 1975 (aged 35)
Leire Olaberria Dorronsoro (ESP)	February 17, 1977 (aged 33)

=== Lointek ===
Ages as of 1 January 2011.

Rider	Date of birth
Ester Alves (POR)	July 22, 1981 (aged 29)
Emilie Blanquefort (FRA)	May 6, 1988 (aged 22)
Mireia Epelde Bikendi (ESP)	October 29, 1985 (aged 25)
Arantxa Garcia Morte (ESP)	August 16, 1990 (aged 20)
Leticia Gil Parra (ESP)	August 1, 1982 (aged 28)

Rider	Date of birth
Lucía González Blanco (ESP)	July 9, 1990 (aged 20)
Eneritz Iturriagaechevarria Mazaga (ESP)	September 17, 1980 (aged 30)
Belén López Morales (ESP)	April 18, 1984 (aged 26)
Fanny Riberot (FRA)	March 17, 1983 (aged 27)
Anne-Marie Schmitt (LUX)	January 23, 1989 (aged 21)

=== Asptt Dijon–Bourgogne ===
Rider	Date of birth
Aurélie Bramante (FRA)	May 10, 1984 (aged 26)
Alessia Bugeia (FRA)	September 23, 1987 (aged 23)
Joanne Duval (FRA)	October 27, 1988 (aged 22)
Mélanie Ferrand (FRA)	February 27, 1991 (aged 19)
Roxane Fournier (FRA)	November 7, 1991 (aged 19)
Sylvie Gaillon (FRA)	August 17, 1972 (aged 38)
Jessica Livet (FRA)	October 4, 1992 (aged 18)

Rider	Date of birth
Cathy Moncassin Prime (FRA)	June 3, 1977 (aged 33)
Flavie Montusclat (FRA)	February 15, 1991 (aged 19)
Alexia Muffat (FRA)	November 15, 1992 (aged 18)
Margot Ortega (FRA)	February 20, 1990 (aged 20)
Eléonore Saraiva (FRA)	February 28, 1991 (aged 19)
Béatrice Thomas (FRA)	July 7, 1981 (aged 29)

=== Team GSD Gestion ===
Rider	Date of birth
Charlotte Bravard (FRA)	January 12, 1992 (aged 18)
Mélanie Bravard (FRA)	April 13, 1987 (aged 23)
Nathalie Cadol (FRA)	February 24, 1972 (aged 38)
Lauren Creamer (IRL)	January 20, 1992 (aged 18)
Siobhan Horgan (IRL)	December 22, 1978 (aged 32)
Monique Ludovicy (LUX)	August 30, 1977 (aged 33)

Rider	Date of birth
Christine Majerus (LUX)	February 25, 1987 (aged 23)
Eugenie Mermillod (FRA)	May 27, 1986 (aged 24)
Mireille Robin (FRA)	February 8, 1975 (aged 35)
Fabienne Schauss (LUX)	September 1, 1984 (aged 26)
Lina-Kristin Schink (GER)	November 5, 1983 (aged 27)

=== Vienne Futuroscope ===
Rider	Date of birth
Marion Azam (FRA)	October 13, 1991 (aged 19)
Julie Beveridge (CAN)	June 30, 1988 (aged 22)
Karol-Ann Canuel (CAN)	April 18, 1988 (aged 22)
Audrey Cordon-Ragot (FRA)	September 22, 1989 (aged 21)
Sophie Creux (FRA)	July 8, 1981 (aged 29)
Fiona Dutriaux (FRA)	January 25, 1989 (aged 21)
Florence Girardet (FRA)	June 12, 1986 (aged 24)

Rider	Date of birth
Pascale Jeuland (FRA)	June 2, 1987 (aged 23)
Jenifer Letue (FRA)	June 2, 1990 (aged 20)
Emmanuelle Merlot (FRA)	January 10, 1986 (aged 24)
Edwige Pitel (FRA)	June 4, 1967 (aged 43)
Marion Rousse (FRA)	August 17, 1991 (aged 19)
Gabriela Slamova (CZE)	April 29, 1991 (aged 19)

=== Team Garmin–Cervélo ===
Rider	Date of birth
Elizabeth Armitstead (GBR)	December 18, 1988 (aged 22)
Noemi Cantele (ITA)	July 17, 1981 (aged 29)
Jessie Daams (BEL)	May 28, 1990 (aged 20)
Sarah-Lena Hofmann (GER)	April 24, 1992 (aged 18)
Sharon Laws (GBR)	July 7, 1974 (aged 36)
Lucy Martin (GBR)	May 5, 1990 (aged 20)

Rider	Date of birth
Emma Pooley (GBR)	October 3, 1982 (aged 28)
Alex Rhodes (AUS)	December 1, 1984 (aged 26)
Carla Ryan (AUS)	September 21, 1985 (aged 25)
Trine Schmidt (DEN)	June 3, 1988 (aged 22)
Iris Slappendel (NED)	February 18, 1985 (aged 25)

=== Abus–Nutrixxion ===
Rider	Date of birth
Katherine Bates (AUS)	May 18, 1982 (aged 28)
Natalie Creswick (GBR)	October 18, 1980 (aged 30)
Anna Fischer (GER)	November 11, 1983 (aged 27)
Melanie Hessling (GER)	February 14, 1982 (aged 28)
Nathalie Lamborelle (LUX)	February 1, 1988 (aged 22)

Rider	Date of birth
Marie Lindberg (SWE)	August 14, 1987 (aged 23)
Maria Grandt Petersen (DEN)	June 19, 1991 (aged 19)
Anna-Bianca Schnitzmeier (GER)	July 27, 1990 (aged 20)
Martina Zwick (GER)	December 12, 1989 (aged 21)

=== China Chongming–Giant Pro Cycling ===
Ages as of 1 January 2011.

Rider	Date of birth
Gao Min (CHN)	January 26, 1982 (aged 28)
Gu Hui Li (CHN)	March 17, 1989 (aged 21)
Huang Li (CHN)	December 23, 1988 (aged 22)
Jiang Xiujie (CHN)	January 5, 1989 (aged 21)
Liu Xiao Hui (CHN)	August 5, 1989 (aged 21)
Liu Xin (CHN)	November 5, 1986 (aged 24)
Luo Xiaoling (CHN)	September 20, 1988 (aged 22)
Meng Lang (CHN)	March 6, 1984 (aged 26)

Rider	Date of birth
Shen Fan Li (CHN)	July 15, 1991 (aged 19)
Sheng Yongyan (CHN)	September 5, 1987 (aged 23)
Shi Lina (CHN)	January 12, 1991 (aged 19)
Tang Kerong (CHN)	May 7, 1988 (aged 22)
Wang Cui (CHN)	October 15, 1989 (aged 21)
Wong Wan Yiu Jamie (HKG)	November 4, 1986 (aged 24)
Zhao Na (CHN)	April 29, 1984 (aged 26)

=== Colavita Forno D'Asolo ===
Rider	Date of birth
Annalisa Barbieri (ITA)	November 17, 1991 (aged 19)
Giada Borgato (ITA)	June 15, 1989 (aged 21)
Rushlee Buchanan (NZL)	January 20, 1988 (aged 22)
Elena Cecchini (ITA)	May 25, 1992 (aged 18)
Catherine Cheatley (NZL)	January 6, 1983 (aged 27)
Alessandra D'Ettorre (ITA)	May 8, 1978 (aged 32)
Andrea Dvorak (USA)	October 9, 1980 (aged 30)
Francesca Faustini (ITA)	December 27, 1988 (aged 22)
Uênia Fernandes de Souza (BRA)	August 12, 1984 (aged 26)
Edita Janeliūnaitė (LTU)	December 16, 1988 (aged 22)

Rider	Date of birth
Rosane Kirch (BRA)	April 19, 1976 (aged 34)
Christina Kollmann (AUT)	March 14, 1988 (aged 22)
Heather Logan (CAN)	May 14, 1982 (aged 28)
Svetlana Pauliukaitė (LTU)	July 31, 1985 (aged 25)
Tetyana Ryabchenko (UKR)	August 28, 1989 (aged 21)
Modesta Vžesniauskaitė (LTU)	October 17, 1983 (aged 27)
Giorgia Bronzini (ITA)	August 3, 1983 (aged 27)
Theresa Cliff-Ryan (USA)	June 19, 1978 (aged 32)
Barbara Guarischi (ITA)	October 2, 1990 (aged 20)

=== Gauss ===
Rider	Date of birth
Tatiana Antoshina (RUS)	July 27, 1982 (aged 28)
Alessandra Borchi (ITA)	August 15, 1983 (aged 27)
Christel Ferrier-Bruneau (FRA)	July 8, 1979 (aged 31)
Lorena Foresi (ITA)	April 11, 1988 (aged 22)
Sylwia Kapusta (POL)	December 8, 1982 (aged 28)
Elena Kuchinskaya (RUS)	December 11, 1984 (aged 26)
Yuliya Martisova (RUS)	June 15, 1976 (aged 34)

Rider	Date of birth
Valentina Scandolara (ITA)	May 1, 1990 (aged 20)
Eleonora Suelotto (ITA)	December 16, 1988 (aged 22)
Luisa Tamanini (ITA)	January 31, 1980 (aged 30)
Aurore Verhoeven (FRA)	January 15, 1990 (aged 20)
Ambra Zago (ITA)	June 5, 1991 (aged 19)
Susanna Zorzi (ITA)	March 13, 1992 (aged 18)

=== Kleo Ladies Team ===
Rider	Date of birth
Giada Balzan (ITA)	January 5, 1991 (aged 19)
Tania Belvederesi (ITA)	January 31, 1978 (aged 32)
Giulia Bonetti (ITA)	November 12, 1989 (aged 21)
Chiara Bortolus (ITA)	June 7, 1988 (aged 22)
Martina Corazza (ITA)	June 8, 1979 (aged 31)
Annalisa Cucinotta (ITA)	March 4, 1986 (aged 24)

Rider	Date of birth
Andrea Graus (AUT)	November 13, 1979 (aged 31)
Angela Mcclure (AUS)	November 12, 1990 (aged 20)
Chiara Nadalutti (ITA)	March 8, 1985 (aged 25)
Francesca Tognali (ITA)	April 6, 1985 (aged 25)
Elena Valentini (ITA)	March 30, 1992 (aged 18)

=== S.C. Michela Fanini Rox ===
Rider	Date of birth
Karin Aune (SWE)	April 29, 1975 (aged 35)
Chiara Ciuffini (ITA)	December 11, 1985 (aged 25)
Sara Grifi (ITA)	September 26, 1988 (aged 22)
Małgorzata Jasińska (POL)	January 18, 1984 (aged 26)
Verónica Leal Balderas (MEX)	October 15, 1977 (aged 33)
Alice Marmorini (ITA)	January 11, 1987 (aged 23)

Rider	Date of birth
Ella Michal (ISR)	July 24, 1987 (aged 23)
Nina Ovcharenko (UKR)	August 7, 1984 (aged 26)
Vanessa Elettra Ricci (ITA)	February 4, 1989 (aged 21)
Martina Růžičková (CZE)	March 22, 1980 (aged 30)
Grete Treier (EST)	December 12, 1977 (aged 33)

=== SC MCipollini–Giordana ===
Rider	Date of birth
Monia Baccaille (ITA)	April 10, 1984 (aged 26)
Marta Bastianelli (ITA)	April 30, 1987 (aged 23)
Yulia Blindyuk (RUS)	December 11, 1984 (aged 26)
Rossella Callovi (ITA)	April 5, 1991 (aged 19)
Nicole Cooke (GBR)	April 13, 1983 (aged 27)
Elisa Frisoni (ITA)	August 8, 1985 (aged 25)

Rider	Date of birth
Samantha Galassi (ITA)	July 28, 1988 (aged 22)
Rossella Gobbo (ITA)	January 27, 1991 (aged 19)
Tatiana Guderzo (ITA)	August 22, 1984 (aged 26)
Jennifer Hohl (SUI)	February 3, 1986 (aged 24)
Fabiana Luperini (ITA)	January 14, 1974 (aged 36)
Marta Tagliaferro (ITA)	November 4, 1989 (aged 21)

=== Top Girls Fassa Bortolo ===
Rider	Date of birth
Elena Berlato (ITA)	August 2, 1988 (aged 22)
Valentina Carretta (ITA)	September 16, 1989 (aged 21)
Jennifer Fiori (ITA)	March 23, 1986 (aged 24)
Simona Frapporti (ITA)	July 14, 1988 (aged 22)
Elisa Longo Borghini (ITA)	December 10, 1991 (aged 19)

Rider	Date of birth
Bridie O'Donnell (AUS)	April 29, 1974 (aged 36)
Gloria Presti (ITA)	September 29, 1989 (aged 21)
Giulia Ronchi (ITA)	March 6, 1992 (aged 18)
Silvia Valsecchi (ITA)	July 19, 1982 (aged 28)

=== Vaiano Solaristech ===
Rider	Date of birth
Francesca Anichini (ITA)	January 19, 1992 (aged 18)
Valentina Bastianelli (ITA)	December 4, 1987 (aged 23)
Irene Falorni (ITA)	January 5, 1990 (aged 20)
Urtė Juodvalkytė (LTU)	December 23, 1986 (aged 24)
Leleivyte Rasa (LTU)	July 22, 1988 (aged 22)
Alessia Martini (ITA)	January 10, 1992 (aged 18)

Rider	Date of birth
Simona Martini (ITA)	April 25, 1990 (aged 20)
Silvia Moroni (ITA)	January 9, 1992 (aged 18)
Flávia Oliveira (BRA)	October 27, 1981 (aged 29)
Kataržina Sosna (LTU)	November 30, 1990 (aged 20)
Eleonora Spaliviero (ITA)	September 7, 1989 (aged 21)
Chiara Vanni (ITA)	July 21, 1989 (aged 21)

=== AA Drink–leontien.nl ===
Ages as of 1 January 2011.

Rider	Date of birth
Chantal Blaak (NED)	October 22, 1989 (aged 21)
Lucinda Brand (NED)	July 2, 1989 (aged 21)
Eline De Roover (BEL)	April 4, 1992 (aged 18)
Marlen Jöhrend (GER)	January 2, 1986 (aged 24)
Willy Kanis (NED)	July 27, 1984 (aged 26)
Monique van de Ree (NED)	March 2, 1988 (aged 22)
Daphny van den Brand (NED)	April 6, 1978 (aged 32)
Irene van den Broek (NED)	August 26, 1980 (aged 30)

Rider	Date of birth
Heleen van Vliet (NED)	September 17, 1982 (aged 28)
Josien van Wingerden (NED)	September 22, 1987 (aged 23)
Linda Villumsen (NZL)	April 9, 1985 (aged 25)
Marijn de Vries (NED)	November 19, 1978 (aged 32)
Kirsten Wild (NED)	October 15, 1982 (aged 28)
Anne de Wildt (Until 22/6) (NED)
Trixi Worrack (GER)	September 28, 1981 (aged 29)

=== Dolmans Landscaping Team ===
As of 1 January 2011. Ages as of 1 January 2011.

Rider	Date of birth
Daniëlle Bekkering (NED)	December 25, 1976 (aged 34)
Evelien Bekkering (NED)	November 21, 1978 (aged 32)
Martine Bras (NED)	May 17, 1978 (aged 32)
Shanne Braspennincx (NED)	May 18, 1991 (aged 19)
Petra Dijkman (NED)	November 13, 1979 (aged 31)
Janneke Ensing (NED)	September 21, 1986 (aged 24)
Alie Gercama (NED)	July 25, 1990 (aged 20)

Rider	Date of birth
Nina Kessler (NED)	July 4, 1988 (aged 22)
Birgit Lavrijssen (NED)	January 16, 1991 (aged 19)
Marissa Otten (NED)	July 11, 1989 (aged 21)
Mascha Pijnenborg (NED)	June 30, 1981 (aged 29)
Geerike Schreurs (NED)	May 19, 1989 (aged 21)
Winanda Spoor (NED)	January 27, 1991 (aged 19)
Laura van der Kamp (NED)	July 24, 1992 (aged 18)

=== Nederland Bloeit ===
Rider	Date of birth
Emilie Aubry (SUI)	February 16, 1989 (aged 21)
Sarah Düster (GER)	July 10, 1982 (aged 28)
Loes Gunnewijk (NED)	November 27, 1980 (aged 30)
Janneke Kanis (NED)	February 15, 1985 (aged 25)
Marianne Peltzer (NED)	February 11, 1986 (aged 24)
Patricia Schwager (SUI)	December 6, 1983 (aged 27)

Rider	Date of birth
Noortje Tabak (NED)	July 13, 1988 (aged 22)
Emma Trott (GBR)	December 24, 1989 (aged 21)
Marieke van Wanroij (NED)	July 5, 1979 (aged 31)
Annemiek van Vleuten (NED)	October 8, 1982 (aged 28)
Marianne Vos (NED)	May 13, 1987 (aged 23)

=== Hitec Products UCK ===
Rider	Date of birth
Johanna Bergseth (NOR)	August 26, 1987 (aged 23)
Lisa Brennauer (GER)	June 8, 1988 (aged 22)
Tiffany Cromwell (AUS)	July 6, 1988 (aged 22)
Cecilie Johansen (NOR)	October 2, 1989 (aged 21)
Emma Johansson (SWE)	September 23, 1983 (aged 27)
Tone Hatteland Lima (NOR)	December 18, 1979 (aged 31)

Rider	Date of birth
Emilie Moberg (NOR)	July 12, 1991 (aged 19)
Sara Mustonen Lichan (SWE)	February 8, 1981 (aged 29)
Lise Nøstvold (NOR)	February 14, 1987 (aged 23)
Kristine Saastad (NOR)	August 31, 1987 (aged 23)
Marie Voreland (NOR)	September 20, 1990 (aged 20)
Fröydis Waersted (NOR)	June 15, 1987 (aged 23)

=== Alriksson–Go:Green ===
Rider	Date of birth
Monica Holler (SWE)	May 15, 1984 (aged 26)
Jessica Kihlbom (SWE)	June 11, 1989 (aged 21)
Johanna Nilsson (SWE)	November 21, 1990 (aged 20)
Madelene Olsson (SWE)	November 14, 1982 (aged 28)
Malin Rydlund (SWE)	May 3, 1977 (aged 33)

Rider	Date of birth
Linnea Sjöblom (SWE)	November 12, 1989 (aged 21)
Isabelle Söderberg (SWE)	May 28, 1989 (aged 21)
Jennie Stenerhag (SWE)	June 6, 1975 (aged 35)
Linn Torp (NOR)	April 22, 1977 (aged 33)

=== Diadora–Pasta Zara ===
Rider	Date of birth
Mara Abbott (USA)	November 14, 1985 (aged 25)
Alyona Andruk (UKR)	June 11, 1987 (aged 23)
Inga Čilvinaitė (LTU)	February 14, 1986 (aged 24)
Giulia Donato (ITA)	September 26, 1992 (aged 18)
Oxana Kozonchuk (RUS)	May 28, 1988 (aged 22)
Claudia Lichtenberg (GER)	November 17, 1985 (aged 25)
Sinead Miller (USA)	June 9, 1990 (aged 20)

Rider	Date of birth
Rachel Neylan (AUS)	March 9, 1982 (aged 28)
Shelley Olds (USA)	September 30, 1980 (aged 30)
Eleonora Patuzzo (ITA)	October 16, 1989 (aged 21)
Amber Pierce (USA)	March 25, 1981 (aged 29)
Francesca Stefani (ITA)	January 25, 1991 (aged 19)
Jessica Uebelhart (SUI)	October 16, 1990 (aged 20)
Olga Zabelinskaya (RUS)	May 10, 1980 (aged 30)

=== HTC Highroad Women ===
Ages as of 1 January 2011.

Rider	Date of birth
Judith Arndt (GER)	July 23, 1976 (aged 34)
Charlotte Becker (GER)	May 19, 1983 (aged 27)
Katie Colclough (GBR)	January 20, 1990 (aged 20)
Ellen van Dijk (NED)	February 11, 1987 (aged 23)
Emilia Fahlin (SWE)	October 24, 1988 (aged 22)
Chloe Hosking (AUS)	October 1, 1990 (aged 20)
Amanda Miller (USA)	December 13, 1986 (aged 24)

Rider	Date of birth
Amber Neben (USA)	February 18, 1975 (aged 35)
Ally Stacher (USA)	June 8, 1981 (aged 29)
Evelyn Stevens (USA)	May 9, 1983 (aged 27)
Carla Swart (Note: Swart died on 19 January 2011.) (RSA)	November 26, 1987 (aged 23)
Ina-Yoko Teutenberg (GER)	October 28, 1974 (aged 36)
Adrie Visser (NED)	October 19, 1983 (aged 27)

=== TIBCO–To The Top ===
Rider	Date of birth
Megan Guarnier (USA)	May 4, 1985 (aged 25)
Joanne Kiesanowski (NZL)	May 24, 1979 (aged 31)
Emma Mackie (AUS)	September 9, 1984 (aged 26)
Meredith Miller (USA)	December 26, 1973 (aged 37)
Joëlle Numainville (CAN)	November 20, 1987 (aged 23)
Alison Powers (USA)	December 14, 1979 (aged 31)
Kendall Ryan (USA)	August 10, 1992 (aged 18)

Rider	Date of birth
Samantha Schneider (USA)	September 18, 1990 (aged 20)
Serena Sheridan (NZL)	August 27, 1985 (aged 25)
Carmen Small (USA)	April 20, 1980 (aged 30)
Carlee Taylor (AUS)	February 15, 1989 (aged 21)
Tara Whitten (CAN)	July 13, 1980 (aged 30)
Erinne Willock (CAN)	October 16, 1981 (aged 29)
Lia Winfield (USA)	March 7, 1986 (aged 24)

Preceded by 2010	List of UCI Women's Teams; 2011	Succeeded by 2012
