= 2018 Tour of Chongming Island =

2018 UCI Women's World Tour, race 10 of 24

Race details
- Dates: 26–28 April 2018
- Stages: 3
- Distance: 359.3 km (223.3 mi)
- Winning time: 8h 45' 55"

Results
Jersey awarded to the overall winner	Winner	Charlotte Becker (GER)	(Hitec Products–Birk Sport)
	Second	Shannon Malseed (AUS)	(Tibco–Silicon Valley Bank)
	Third	Anastasiia Iakovenko (RUS)	(BTC City Ljubljana)
Jersey awarded to the points classification winner	Points	Giorgia Bronzini (ITA)	(Cylance Pro Cycling)
Jersey awarded to the mountains classification winner	Mountains	Lucy Garner (GBR)	(Wiggle High5)
Jersey awarded to the youth classification winner	Youth	Anastasiia Iakovenko (RUS)	(BTC City Ljubljana)
	Team	Tibco–Silicon Valley Bank	

The 2018 Tour of Chongming Island was the twelfth staging of the Tour of Chongming Island, a women's stage race held in Shanghai, China. It ran from 26 to 28 April 2018, as the 10th event of the 2018 UCI Women's World Tour. German rider Charlotte Becker won the event ahead of Australian Shannon Malseed and Russian Anastasiia Iakovenko. Becker moved into the lead after she won stage 2 in a five-woman sprint.

== Teams ==
Eighteen teams participated in the race. Each team had a maximum of six riders:

Professional women's teams

- Mitchelton–Scott
- Wiggle High5
- Alé–Cipollini
- Cylance Pro Cycling
- FDJ Nouvelle-Aquitaine Futuroscope
- BTC City Ljubljana
- Hitec Products–Birk Sport
- Team Virtu Cycling
- Valcar–PBM
- Tibco–Silicon Valley Bank
- Doltcini–Van Eyck Sport
- Swapit–Agolíco
- Minsk Cycling Club
- China Chongming–Liv
- Thailand Women's Cycling Team
- Team Dukla Praha

National teams

- Hong Kong
- Malaysia

== Race Summary ==
UCI Report

== Stages ==
=== Stage 1 ===
Stage 1 result

Rank	Rider	Team	Time
1	Giorgia Bronzini (ITA)	Cylance Pro Cycling	2h 38' 56"
2	Kelly Druyts (BEL)	Doltcini–Van Eyck Sport	s.t.
3	Silvia Persico (ITA)	Valcar–PBM	s.t.
4	Sheyla Gutiérrez (ESP)	Cylance Pro Cycling	s.t.
5	Eugénie Duval (FRA)	FDJ Nouvelle-Aquitaine Futuroscope	s.t.
6	Barbara Guarischi (ITA)	Team Virtu Cycling	s.t.
7	Annette Edmondson (AUS)	Wiggle High5	s.t.
8	Hanna Tserakh (BLR)	Minsk Cycling Club	s.t.
9	Anastasia Iakovenko (RUS)	BTC City Ljubljana	s.t.
10	Daniela Reis (POR)	Doltcini–Van Eyck Sport	s.t.

General classification after Stage 1

Rank	Rider	Team	Time
1	Giorgia Bronzini (ITA)	Cylance Pro Cycling	2h 38' 46"
2	Kelly Druyts (BEL)	Doltcini–Van Eyck Sport	+ 4"
3	Silvia Persico (ITA)	Valcar–PBM	+ 6"
4	Jutatip Maneephan (THA)	Thailand Women's Cycling Team	+ 7"
5	Kirsten Wild (NED)	Wiggle High5	s.t.
6	Jolien D'Hoore (BEL)	Mitchelton–Scott	+ 8"
7	Claudia Koster (NED)	Team Virtu Cycling	s.t.
8	Chloe Hosking (AUS)	Alé–Cipollini	+ 9"
9	Íngrid Drexel (MEX)	Tibco–Silicon Valley Bank	s.t.
10	Sheyla Gutiérrez (ESP)	Cylance Pro Cycling	+ 10"

=== Stage 2 ===
Stage 2 result

Rank	Rider	Team	Time
1	Charlotte Becker (GER)	Hitec Products–Birk Sport	3h 03' 22"
2	Shannon Malseed (AUS)	Tibco–Silicon Valley Bank	s.t.
3	Anastasia Iakovenko (RUS)	BTC City Ljubljana	s.t.
4	Dalia Muccioli (ITA)	Valcar–PBM	s.t.
5	Coralie Demay (FRA)	FDJ Nouvelle-Aquitaine Futuroscope	+ 3"
6	Jolien D'Hoore (BEL)	Mitchelton–Scott	+ 1' 12"
7	Giorgia Bronzini (ITA)	Cylance Pro Cycling	s.t.
8	Barbara Guarischi (ITA)	Team Virtu Cycling	s.t.
9	Chloe Hosking (AUS)	Alé–Cipollini	s.t.
10	Anna Trevisi (ITA)	Alé–Cipollini	s.t.

General classification after Stage 2

Rank	Rider	Team	Time
1	Charlotte Becker (GER)	Hitec Products–Birk Sport	5h 42' 05"
2	Shannon Malseed (AUS)	Tibco–Silicon Valley Bank	+ 5"
3	Anastasia Iakovenko (RUS)	BTC City Ljubljana	+ 8"
4	Dalia Muccioli (ITA)	Valcar–PBM	+ 13"
5	Coralie Demay (FRA)	FDJ Nouvelle-Aquitaine Futuroscope	+ 16"
6	Giorgia Bronzini (ITA)	Cylance Pro Cycling	+ 1' 13"
7	Kelly Druyts (BEL)	Doltcini–Van Eyck Sport	+ 1' 19"
8	Jolien D'Hoore (BEL)	Mitchelton–Scott	+ 1' 20"
9	Silvia Persico (ITA)	Valcar–PBM	+ 1' 21"
10	Jutatip Maneephan (THA)	Thailand Women's Cycling Team	+ 1' 22"

=== Stage 3 ===
Stage 3 result

Rank	Rider	Team	Time
1	Kirsten Wild (NED)	Wiggle High5	3h 03' 50"
2	Jolien D'Hoore (BEL)	Mitchelton–Scott	s.t.
3	Giorgia Bronzini (ITA)	Cylance Pro Cycling	s.t.
4	Kelly Druyts (BEL)	Doltcini–Van Eyck Sport	s.t.
5	Barbara Guarischi (ITA)	Team Virtu Cycling	s.t.
6	Chloe Hosking (AUS)	Alé–Cipollini	s.t.
7	Jutatip Maneephan (THA)	Thailand Women's Cycling Team	s.t.
8	Kendall Ryan (USA)	Tibco–Silicon Valley Bank	s.t.
9	Kelly Markus (NED)	Doltcini–Van Eyck Sport	s.t.
10	Katerina Kohoutková (CZE)	Team Dukla Praha	s.t.

General classification after Stage 3

Rank	Rider	Team	Time
1	Charlotte Becker (GER)	Hitec Products–Birk Sport	8h 45' 55"
2	Shannon Malseed (AUS)	Tibco–Silicon Valley Bank	+ 5"
3	Anastasia Iakovenko (RUS)	BTC City Ljubljana	+ 8"
4	Dalia Muccioli (ITA)	Valcar–PBM	+ 13"
5	Coralie Demay (FRA)	FDJ Nouvelle-Aquitaine Futuroscope	+ 16"
6	Giorgia Bronzini (ITA)	Cylance Pro Cycling	+ 1' 04"
7	Kirsten Wild (NED)	Wiggle High5	+ 1' 12"
8	Jolien D'Hoore (BEL)	Mitchelton–Scott	+ 1' 13"
9	Chloe Hosking (AUS)	Alé–Cipollini	+ 1' 18"
10	Kelly Druyts (BEL)	Doltcini–Van Eyck Sport	+ 1' 19"

== Classification leadership table ==
Classification leadership by stage
Stage	Winner	General classification	Points classification	Mountains classification	Young rider classification	Chinese rider classification	Team classification
1	Giorgia Bronzini	Giorgia Bronzini	Giorgia Bronzini	Lucy Garner	Silvia Persico	Yue Bai	Cylance Pro Cycling
2	Charlotte Becker	Charlotte Becker	Giorgia Bronzini	Lucy Garner	Anastasia Iakovenko	Yue Bai	Tibco–Silicon Valley Bank
3	Kirsten Wild	Charlotte Becker	Giorgia Bronzini	Lucy Garner	Anastasia Iakovenko	Yue Bai	Tibco–Silicon Valley Bank
Final		Charlotte Becker	Giorgia Bronzini	Lucy Garner	Anastasia Iakovenko	Yue Bai	Tibco–Silicon Valley Bank

== UCI World Tour ==
=== Attributed points ===
Position	1st	2nd	3rd	4th	5th	6th	7th	8th	9th	10th	11th	12th	13th	14th	15th	16-30th	31-40th
General classification	200	150	125	100	85	70	60	50	40	35	30	25	20	15	10	5	3
Stages	25	20	18	16	14	12	10	8	6	4
Leader's jersey	5
