= Gao Min =

Gao Min may refer to:

- Gao Min (diver) (born 1970), Chinese diver
- Gao Min (cyclist) (born 1982), Chinese cyclist

== See also ==
- Gao (surname)
