= Li Jiaqi =

Li Jiaqi is the name of:

- Li Jiaqi (figure skater) (born 1990), Chinese figure skater
- Li Jiaqi (footballer) (born 1991), Chinese association footballer
- Li Jiaqi (cyclist) (born 1995/6), Chinese cyclist
- Li Jiaqi (field hockey) (born 1995), Chinese field hockey player
- Li Jiaqi (beauty influencer) (born 1992), Chinese cosmetics influencer and entrepreneur
- Li Jiaqi (actress, born 1995) (born 1995), Chinese actress, formerly known as Lamu Yangzi (辣目洋子) as stage name before September 2022
- Nicky Li (born 1997), Chinese actress
