= Tian Yuanyuan =

Chinese cyclist

Personal information
- Born: 3 July 1992 (age 34) China

Cycling career
- Sport: Cycling
- Disciplines: Road cycling, Track cycling

Professional team
- 2014–2015: China Chongming–Giant Pro Cycling

Tian Yuanyuan (Chinese: 田媛媛, born 3 July 1992) is a track and road cyclist from China. She represented her nation at the 2015 UCI Track Cycling World Championships. She is from Sichuan.

== Major results ==
2014
2nd Omnium, China Track Cup
2nd Omnium, Hong Kong International Track Cup
3rd Team Pursuit, Hong Kong International Track Cup (with Feng Chu, Li Ying Tong and Yang Zhaochun)
2015
1st Omnium, China Track Cup
2017
2nd Team Pursuit, National Track Championships (with Chen Qiaolin, Liu Dexiang and Liu Jiali)
