= Li Lixin =

Chinese cyclist

Personal information
- Born: 15 February 1989 (age 37)

Cycling career
- Sport: Cycling
- Role: Rider

Li Lixin (Chinese: 李立新; born 15 February 1989) is a Chinese professional racing cyclist. She rides for China Chongming-Liv-Champion System Pro Cycling.

== See also ==
- List of 2015 UCI Women's Teams and riders
