= Lu Siying =

Chinese cyclist

Personal information
- Full name: Lu Siying
- Born: 4 November 1996 (age 29)

Cycling career
- Sport: Cycling
- Current team: China Liv Pro Cycling
- Discipline: Road
- Role: Rider

Professional team
- 2018–: China Chongming–Liv

Lu Siying (born 4 November 1996) is a Chinese professional racing cyclist, who currently rides for UCI Women's Continental Team China Liv Pro Cycling.
