= China Liv Pro Cycling =

Hong Kong cycling team

Team information
- UCI code: GPC
- Registered: Hong Kong (2006–2021); China (2023–)
- Founded: 2006
- Disciplines: Road; Track
- Status: UCI Women's Team (2006–2019); UCI Women's Continental Team (2020–present)
- Bicycles: Giant

Team name history
- 2006–2010 2011–2014 2015–2016 2017–2018 2018–: Giant Pro Cycling; China Chongming–Giant Pro Cycling; China Chongming–Liv–Champion System Pro Cycling; China Chongming–Liv; China Liv Pro Cycling

China Liv Pro Cycling (Chinese: 中国崇明-丽芙-卓比奥斯女子职业自行车队) is a professional women's road bicycle racing team initially based Hong Kong until 2021 and then based out of China .

== Team roster ==
As of 20 January 2021.

| Rider | Date of birth |
|---|---|
| Cao Yuan (CHN) | 2 February 1997 (age 29) |
| Leung Bo Yee (HKG) | 21 November 1993 (age 32) |
| Leung Hoi Wah (HKG) | 23 September 1998 (age 27) |
| Leung Wing Yee (HKG) | 29 October 1996 (age 29) |
| Liu Jiali (CHN) | 6 April 1994 (age 32) |

| Rider | Date of birth |
|---|---|
| Lu Siying (CHN) | 4 November 1996 (age 29) |
| Ng Sze Wing (HKG) | 21 June 2000 (age 26) |
| Pang Yao (HKG) | 27 May 1995 (age 31) |
| Yang Qianyu (HKG) | 7 March 1993 (age 33) |
| Zhao Xisha (CHN) | 28 September 1992 (age 33) |

== Major results ==
2006
1st Tour de Gastown, Gina Grain
1st Asian Cycling Championships (Time Trial), Wang Li
1st Asian Games (Time Trial), Li Meifang
2007
1st Tour of Chongming Time Trial, Liu Yongli
1st Overall Tour of Chongming Island, Li Meifang

1st Stage 4, Li Meifang

1st Boucle des Championnes - Royat, Wang Fei
1st Asian Cycling Championships (Time Trial), Li Meifang
1st Asian Cycling Championships (Road Race), Meng Lang
2008
1st UCI World Cup Chongming (Points race), Jamie Wong
1st Asian Cycling Championships (Time Trial), Li Meifang
1st Asian Cycling Championships (Road Race), Min Gao
1st Tour of Chongming Time Trial, Li Meifang
1st Overall Tour of Chongming Island, Li Meifang

1st Stage 1, Yun Mei Wu
1st Stage 2, Li Meifang

2010
1st Asian Games Track Championships (Points race), Liu Xin
2011
1st Asia Cup Individual Pursuit, Jamie Wong
2012
1st Overall Tour of Thailand, Liu Xin

1st Stage 2, Liu Xin

1st Tour of Zhoushan Island II, Liu Xiaohui
2013
1st Track Asia Cup (Individual Pursuit) Jamie Wong
1st Track Asia Cup (Team Pursuit), Jamie Wong
1st Track Asia Cup (Points race), Jamie Wong
East Asian Track Games (Individual Pursuit), Huang Dongyan
2014
1st Track Asia Cup (3 km Pursuit), Jamie Wong
1st Track Asia Cup (Omnium), Luo Xiaoling
1st Track Asia Cup (Points race), Jamie Wong
2015
1st Overall The Princess Maha Chackri Sirindhon's Cup, Meng Zhaojuan

1st Stage 3, Meng Zhaojuan

1st Beijing Omnium, Tian Yuanyuan
2017
1st Asian Cycling Championships (Team Pursuit), Huang Dongyan
1st Asian Cycling Championships (Team Pursuit), Luo Xiaoling
1st Asian Cycling Championships, Individual Time Trial, Liang Hongyu

== National and continental champions ==
2007
China Time Trial, Meifang Li
China Road Race, Na Zhao
2011
Hong Kong Road Race, Wan Yiu Jamie Wong
2012
Asian Track (Points race), Wan Yiu Jamie Wong
Hong Kong Road Race, Wan Yiu Jamie Wong
2013
Asian Track (Points race), Wan Yiu Jamie Wong
Hong Kong Track (Individual Pursuit), Wan Yiu Jamie Wong
Hong Kong Track (Team Pursuit), Wan Yiu Jamie Wong
Hong Kong Road Race, Wan Yiu Jamie Wong
Hong Kong Time Trial, Wan Yiu Jamie Wong
2014
Asian Track (Team Pursuit), Dong Yan Huang
Asian Track (Scratch), Dong Yan Huang
Hong Kong Time Trial, Wan Yiu Jamie Wong
2015
Hong Kong Road Race, Zhao Juan Meng
Hong Kong Track (Scratch), Zhao Juan Meng
Hong Kong Track (Individual sprint), Zhao Juan Meng
Hong Kong Track (Keirin), Zhao Juan Meng
Hong Kong Track (Team sprint), Zhao Juan Meng
China Track (Omnium), Yuanyuan Tian
China Track (Team pursuit), Wan Tong Wang
China Track (Team pursuit), Dong Yan Huang
2016
Hong Kong Road Race, Zhao Juan Meng
2018
China Track (Madison), Jiali Liu
2023
China U23 Time Trial, Yuhang Cui
China U23 Road Race, Yuhang Cui

== Previous squads ==
=== 2016 ===
As of 1 January 2016. Ages as of 1 January 2016.

| Rider | Date of birth |
|---|---|
| An Qi (CHN) | 22 June 1992 (aged 23) |
| Bai Yue (CHN) | 13 December 1992 (aged 23) |
| Chen Qiaolin (CHN) | 2 September 1996 (aged 19) |
| Huang Dongyan (CHN) | 14 December 1993 (aged 22) |
| Huang Li (CHN) | 23 December 1988 (aged 27) |
| Jiang Xiujie (CHN) | 5 January 1989 (aged 26) |
| Li Jiaqi (CHN) | 27 July 1995 (aged 20) |
| Liang Hongyu (CHN) | 23 October 1990 (aged 25) |

| Rider | Date of birth |
|---|---|
| Liu Yanan (CHN) | 25 February 1992 (aged 23) |
| Luo Xiaoling (CHN) | 20 September 1988 (aged 27) |
| Meng Zhao Juan (HKG) | 14 December 1989 (aged 26) |
| Pu Yixian (CHN) | 23 December 1992 (aged 23) |
| Sun Xue (CHN) | 23 November 1990 (aged 25) |
| Wang Wantong (CHN) | 16 February 1994 (aged 21) |
| Zhao Xisha (CHN) | 28 September 1992 (aged 23) |

=== 2015 ===
As of 10 March 2015. Ages as of 1 January 2015.

| Rider | Date of birth |
|---|---|
| Jamie Wong (HKG) | November 4, 1986 (aged 28) |
| Meng Zhaojuan (HKG) | December 14, 1989 (aged 25) |
| Tian Yuanyuan (CHN) | July 3, 1992 (aged 22) |
| Jiang Xiujie (CHN) | January 5, 1989 (aged 25) |
| Zhang Nan (CHN) | March 5, 1989 (aged 25) |
| Li Wenjuan (CHN) | February 6, 1994 (aged 20) |
| Bai Yue (CHN) | December 13, 1992 (aged 22) |
| Huang Dongyan (CHN) | December 14, 1993 (aged 21) |

| Rider | Date of birth |
|---|---|
| Li Lixin (CHN) | February 15, 1989 (aged 25) |
| Wang Cui (CHN) | October 15, 1989 (aged 25) |
| Wang Wantong (CHN) | February 16, 1994 (aged 20) |
| Luo Xiaoling (CHN) | September 20, 1988 (aged 26) |
| Liang Hongyu (CHN) | October 23, 1990 (aged 24) |
| Liu Yanan (CHN) | February 25, 1992 (aged 22) |
| Jiaqi Li (CHN) | July 27, (1995 or 1996) (aged 18 or 19) |
| Zhao Xisha (CHN) | September 28, 1992 (aged 22) |

=== 2014 ===
Ages as of 1 January 2014.

| Rider | Date of birth |
|---|---|
| Guo Lin Fang (CHN) | 16 May 1992 (aged 21) |
| Huang Dongyan (CHN) | 14 December 1993 (aged 20) |
| Huang Li (CHN) | 23 December 1988 (aged 25) |
| Jiang Xiujie (CHN) | 5 January 1989 (aged 24) |
| Liang Hongyu (CHN) | 23 October 1990 (aged 23) |
| Liu Dexiang (CHN) | 20 January 1993 (aged 20) |
| Luo Xiaoling (CHN) | 20 September 1988 (aged 25) |
| Ruan Yue Min (CHN) | 19 October 1993 (aged 20) |

| Rider | Date of birth |
|---|---|
| Song Niman (CHN) | 21 December 1990 (aged 23) |
| Tian Yuanyuan (CHN) | 3 July 1992 (aged 21) |
| Wong Wan Yiu Jamie (HKG) | 4 November 1986 (aged 27) |
| Yan Wei Na (CHN) | 12 December 1991 (aged 22) |
| Zhang Nan (CHN) | 5 March 1989 (aged 24) |
| Zhang Yuzhuo (CHN) | 6 December 1987 (aged 26) |
| Zhao Xi Sha (CHN) | 28 September 1992 (aged 21) |

=== 2013 ===
Ages as of 1 January 2013.

| Rider | Date of birth |
|---|---|
| Huang Dongyan (CHN) | December 14, 1993 (aged 19) |
| Huang Li (CHN) | December 23, 1988 (aged 24) |
| Jiang Xiujie (CHN) | January 5, 1989 (aged 23) |
| Liang Hongyu (CHN) | October 23, 1990 (aged 22) |
| Liu Xiao Hui (CHN) | August 5, 1989 (aged 23) |
| Liu Xin (CHN) | November 5, 1986 (aged 26) |
| Luo Xiaoling (CHN) | September 20, 1988 (aged 24) |
| Meng Lang (CHN) | March 6, 1984 (aged 28) |

| Rider | Date of birth |
|---|---|
| Shen Fan Li (CHN) | July 15, 1991 (aged 21) |
| Sheng Yongyan (CHN) | September 5, 1987 (aged 25) |
| Shi Lina (CHN) | January 12, 1991 (aged 21) |
| Wang Cui (CHN) | October 15, 1989 (aged 23) |
| Wong Wan Yiu Jamie (HKG) | November 4, 1986 (aged 26) |
| Zhang Nan (CHN) | March 5, 1989 (aged 23) |
| Zhang Yuzhuo (CHN) | December 6, 1987 (aged 25) |
| Zhao Na (CHN) | April 29, 1984 (aged 28) |

=== 2012 ===
Ages as of 1 January 2012.

| Rider | Date of birth |
|---|---|
| Chen Li (CHN) | January 20, 1987 (aged 24) |
| Gao Min (CHN) | January 26, 1982 (aged 29) |
| Huang Dongyan (CHN) | December 14, 1993 (aged 18) |
| Huang Li (CHN) | December 23, 1988 (aged 23) |
| Liu Xiao Hui (CHN) | August 5, 1989 (aged 22) |
| Liu Xin (CHN) | November 5, 1986 (aged 25) |
| Luo Xiaoling (CHN) | September 20, 1988 (aged 23) |
| Meng Lang (CHN) | March 6, 1984 (aged 27) |

| Rider | Date of birth |
|---|---|
| Shen Fan Li (CHN) | July 15, 1991 (aged 20) |
| Sheng Yongyan (CHN) | September 5, 1987 (aged 24) |
| Shi Lina (CHN) | January 12, 1991 (aged 20) |
| Tang Kerong (CHN) | May 7, 1988 (aged 23) |
| Wang Cui (CHN) | October 15, 1989 (aged 22) |
| Wong Wan Yiu Jamie (HKG) | November 4, 1986 (aged 25) |
| Wu Chao Mei (CHN) | August 11, 1989 (aged 22) |
| Zhao Na (CHN) | April 29, 1984 (aged 27) |

=== 2011 ===
Ages as of 1 January 2011.

| Rider | Date of birth |
|---|---|
| Gao Min (CHN) | January 26, 1982 (aged 28) |
| Gu Hui Li (CHN) | March 17, 1989 (aged 21) |
| Huang Li (CHN) | December 23, 1988 (aged 22) |
| Jiang Xiujie (CHN) | January 5, 1989 (aged 21) |
| Liu Xiao Hui (CHN) | August 5, 1989 (aged 21) |
| Liu Xin (CHN) | November 5, 1986 (aged 24) |
| Luo Xiaoling (CHN) | September 20, 1988 (aged 22) |
| Meng Lang (CHN) | March 6, 1984 (aged 26) |

| Rider | Date of birth |
|---|---|
| Shen Fan Li (CHN) | July 15, 1991 (aged 19) |
| Sheng Yongyan (CHN) | September 5, 1987 (aged 23) |
| Shi Lina (CHN) | January 12, 1991 (aged 19) |
| Tang Kerong (CHN) | May 7, 1988 (aged 22) |
| Wang Cui (CHN) | October 15, 1989 (aged 21) |
| Wong Wan Yiu Jamie (HKG) | November 4, 1986 (aged 24) |
| Zhao Na (CHN) | April 29, 1984 (aged 26) |
