= Iris Sachet =

French cyclist

Personal information
- Full name: Iris Sachet
- Born: 29 May 1994 (age 32)

Cycling career
- Sport: Cycling
- Current team: Team Elles–Groupama–Pays de la Loire
- Discipline: Road
- Role: Rider
- Rider type: Sprinter

Amateur teams
- 2016: DN 17 Poitou-Charentes
- 2018: DN 17 Nouvelle Aquitaine
- 2020–: Team Elles–Pays de la Loire

Professional teams
- 2013: Bourgogne–Pro Dialog
- 2017: SAS–Macogep
- 2019: Charente-Maritime Women Cycling

Iris Sachet (born 29 May 1994) is a French racing cyclist, who currently rides for French amateur squad Team Elles–Groupama–Pays de la Loire. Sachet was a member of the Charente-Maritime Women Cycling team in 2016, 2018 and its first UCI season in 2019.

== Major results ==
2015
6th Cholet Pays de Loire Dames
7th Overall Tour of Chongming Island
9th Road race, UEC European Under-23 Road Championships
2018
1st Points classification Rás na mBan

1st Stage 6

4th Grand Prix International d'Isbergues
2019
6th La Picto–Charentaise
