= Liang Hongyu (cyclist) =

Chinese cyclist (born 1990)

Personal information
- Full name: Liang Hongyu; Chinese: 梁洪玉; pinyin: Liáng Hóngyù
- Born: 23 October 1990 (age 35) Heilongjiang, China

Cycling career
- Sport: Cycling
- Discipline: Road
- Role: Rider

Professional team
- 2013–2019: China Chongming–Giant Pro Cycling
Medal record
Women's Cycling
Representing China
Military World Games
Bronze medal – third place	Wuhan 2019	individual time trial

Liang Hongyu (Chinese: 梁洪玉; pinyin: Liáng Hóngyù; born 23 October 1990) is a Chinese professional racing cyclist, who last rode for UCI Women's Team China Liv Pro Cycling. She is from Heilongjiang.

She won a bronze medal at the 2019 Military World Games.

== See also ==
- List of 2015 UCI Women's Teams and riders
