= Liu Yanan (cyclist) =

Chinese cyclist

Personal information
- Born: 25 February 1992 (age 34) Heilongjiang, China

Cycling career
- Sport: Cycling
- Role: Rider

Liu Yanan (Chinese: 刘亚男; pinyin: Liu Yanan, born 25 February 1992) is a Chinese professional racing cyclist. She rides for China Chongming-Liv-Champion System Pro Cycling. She is from Heilongjiang.

== See also ==
- List of 2015 UCI Women's Teams and riders
