= Wang Wantong =

Chinese cyclist

Personal information
- Born: 16 February 1994 (age 32) Shanghai, China

Cycling career
- Sport: Cycling
- Current team: Retired
- Discipline: Road
- Role: Rider

Professional team
- 2015–2017: China Chongming–Liv–Champion System

Wang Wantong (Chinese: 王婉桐; pinyin: Wang Wantong; born 16 February 1994) is a Chinese former professional racing cyclist, who rode professionally between 2015 and 2017, entirely for the China Chongming–Liv team. In 2015, she finished tenth at the Tour of Zhoushan Island.

== See also ==
- List of 2015 UCI Women's Teams and riders
