= Zhao Xisha =

Chinese cyclist

Personal information
- Full name: Zhao Xisha; Chinese: 赵茜沙; pinyin: Zhao Xisha
- Born: 28 September 1992 (age 34) Hebei, China

Cycling career
- Sport: Cycling
- Current team: China Liv Pro Cycling
- Discipline: Road
- Role: Rider

Professional team
- 2014–: China Chongming–Giant Pro Cycling
Medal record
Women's Cycling
Representing China
Military World Games
Gold medal – first place	Wuhan 2019	Road race

Zhao Xisha (Chinese: 赵茜沙; pinyin: Zhao Xisha, born 28 September 1992) is a Chinese professional racing cyclist, who currently rides for UCI Women's Continental Team China Liv Pro Cycling. She is from Hebei.

== Major results ==
2015
6th Road race, Asian Road Championships
2017
10th Overall Tour of Zhoushan Island
2019
1st Road race, Military World Games
1st Road race, National Road Championships
3rd China Scenic Avenue II
7th China Scenic Avenue I

== See also ==
- List of 2015 UCI Women's Teams and riders
