= Wang Fei (cyclist) =

Chinese cyclist

Fei Wang
Personal information
- Born: 28 July 1987 (age 39) China

Cycling career
- Sport: Cycling
- Discipline: Road cycling

Professional team
- 2008–2010: Giant Pro Cycling

Wang Fei (Chinese: 王菲, born 28 July 1987) is a road cyclist from China. She represented her nation at the 2007 UCI Road World Championships.
