= Siri Minge =

Norwegian cyclist

Personal information
- Born: 4 February 1994 (age 32)

Cycling career
- Sport: Cycling
- Role: Rider

Siri Minge (born 4 February 1994) is a Norwegian professional racing cyclist.

== See also ==
- Team Hitec Products
