= Zhang Nan (cyclist) =

Chinese cyclist

Personal information
- Born: 5 March 1989 (age 37) Liaoning, China

Cycling career
- Sport: Cycling
- Role: Rider

Professional team
- 2013-2015: China Chongming-Liv-Champion System Pro Cycling

Zhang Nan (Chinese: 张楠; pinyin: Zhang Nan; born 5 March 1989) is a Chinese professional racing cyclist from Liaoning. She rides for the China Chongming-Liv-Champion System Pro Cycling. She competed at the 2014 Asian Games in the road race, finishing in 7th place.

== See also ==
- List of 2015 UCI Women's Teams and riders
