= Li Jiaqi (cyclist) =

Chinese cyclist

Personal information
- Full name: Li Jiaqi; Chinese: 李佳琪
- Born: 27 July 1995 (age 31) or 1996 Heilongjiang, China

Cycling career
- Sport: Cycling
- Discipline: Road
- Role: Rider

Professional teams
- 2015–2016: China Chongming–Liv–Champion System
- 2018–2020: China Chongming–Liv

Li Jiaqi (Chinese: 李佳琪; born 27 July 1995 or 1996) is a Chinese professional racing cyclist, who most recently rode for UCI Women's Continental Team China Liv Pro Cycling. She is from Heilongjiang.

== See also ==
- List of 2015 UCI Women's Teams and riders
