= Bai Yue (cyclist) =

Chinese cyclist

Personal information
- Full name: Bai Yue
- Born: 13 December 1992 (age 33) Shanxi, China

Cycling career
- Sport: Cycling
- Discipline: Road
- Role: Rider

Professional team
- 2015–2019: China Chongming–Liv–Champion System

Bai Yue (Chinese: 白月; pinyin: Bai Yue, born 13 December 1992) is a Chinese professional racing cyclist, who last rode for UCI Women's Team China Liv Pro Cycling. She is from Shanxi.

== See also ==
- List of 2015 UCI Women's Teams and riders
