= Liu Dexiang =

Chinese cyclist

Personal information
- Full name: Liu Dexiang
- Born: 20 January 1993 (age 33)

Cycling career
- Sport: Cycling
- Discipline: Road
- Role: Rider

Professional teams
- 2014: China Chongming–Giant Pro Cycling
- 2018–2020: China Chongming–Liv

Liu Dexiang (Chinese: 刘德香; born 20 January 1993) is a Chinese professional racing cyclist, who most recently rode for UCI Women's Continental Team China Liv Pro Cycling.
