= Jiang Xiujie =

Chinese cyclist

Personal information
- Born: 5 January 1989 (age 37) Beijing, China

Cycling career
- Sport: Cycling
- Role: Rider

Jiang Xiujie (Chinese: 姜秀杰; pinyin: Jiang Xiujie, born 5 January 1989) is a Chinese professional racing cyclist. She rides for China Chongming-Liv-Champion System Pro Cycling. She is from Beijing.

== See also ==
- List of 2015 UCI Women's Teams and riders
