= Rebecca Talen =

Dutch cyclist

Personal information
- Born: 27 October 1993 (age 32) Meppel, Netherlands

Cycling career
- Sport: Cycling
- Role: Rider

Rebecca Talen (born 27 October 1993) is a Dutch professional racing cyclist. She is the daughter of the cyclist John Talen.

== See also ==
- Rabo-Liv Women Cycling Team
