= Christina Kollmann =

Austrian cyclist

Personal information
- Born: 14 March 1988 (age 38)

Cycling career
- Sport: Cycling
- Role: Rider

Christina Kollmann (born 14 March 1988) is an Austrian former professional racing cyclist. She rode for the No Radunion Vitalogic team. At the end of July 2019, Kollmann was suspended for four years for doping violations, after which she announced her retirement.

== See also ==
- List of 2015 UCI Women's Teams and riders
