= Dorleta Eskamendi Gil =

Spanish professional racing cyclist

Personal information
- Born: 2 January 1992 (age 34)

Cycling career
- Sport: Cycling
- Role: Rider

Dorleta Eskamendi Gil (born 2 January 1992) is a Spanish professional racing cyclist. She rides for team Bizkaia–Durango.

== See also ==
- List of 2015 UCI Women's Teams and riders
