= Emma Crum =

New Zealand cyclist

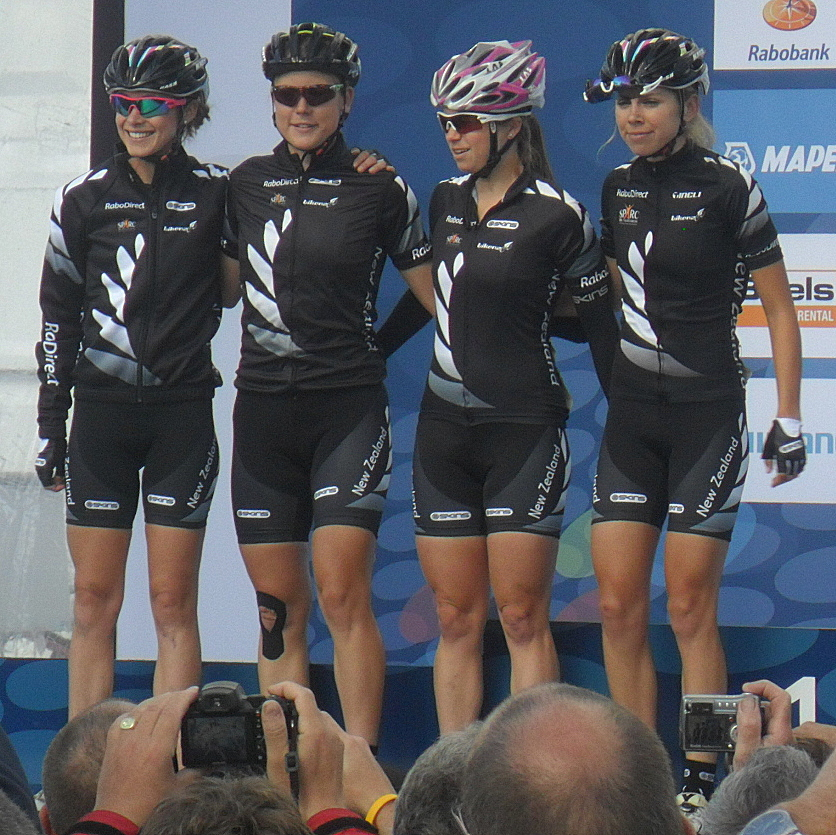
- Emma Crum at the 2012 UCI Road World Championships

Personal information
- Born: 28 January 1989 (age 37) New Zealand

Cycling career
- Sport: Cycling
- Discipline: Road cycling

Professional team
- 2013: Lointek

Emma Crum (born 28 January 1989) is a road cyclist from New Zealand. She participated at the 2010 UCI Road World Championships and 2012 UCI Road World Championships.
