= Yulia Blindyuk =

Russian cyclist

Personal information
- Born: 11 December 1984 (age 41) Russia

Cycling career
- Sport: Cycling
- Discipline: Road cycling

Professional teams
- 2008: S.C. Michela Fanini Rox
- 2011: Mcipollini-Giordana
- 2012: Faren-Honda Team
- 2012-2014: RusVelo

Yulia Blindyuk (born 11 December 1984) is a road cyclist from Russia. She represented her nation at the 2006 and 2008 UCI Road World Championships.
