= Ally Stacher =

American cyclist

Personal information
- Born: June 6, 1987 (age 39) Etna, California, United States

Cycling career
- Sport: Cycling
- Role: Rider

Professional team
- 2011-2014: HTC–Highroad Women

Ally Stacher (born June 6, 1987) is an American professional racing cyclist.

== See also ==
- 2014 Specialized–lululemon season
