= Liu Xiaohui =

Chinese cyclist

Personal information
- Born: 5 August 1989 (age 37) China

Cycling career
- Sport: Cycling
- Discipline: Road cycling

Professional team
- 2010: Giant Pro Cycling

Liu Xiaohui (born 5 August 1989) is a road cyclist from China. In 2012, she won the Tour of Zhoushan Island II.
