= Jennifer Fiori =

Italian cyclist (1986–2021)

Personal information
- Born: 23 March 1986 Fabriano, Italy
- Died: 6 September 2021 (aged 35) Senigallia, Italy

Cycling career
- Sport: Cycling
- Role: Rider

Jennifer Fiori (23 March 1986 – 6 September 2021) was an Italian professional racing cyclist. She was killed in a traffic collision.

== See also ==
- Top Girls Fassa Bortolo
