= Bourgogne–Pro Dialog =

French cycling team

Bourgogne Pro Dialog
Team information
- UCI code: BCF
- Registered: France
- Founded: 2008
- Disbanded: 2013
- Discipline: Road
- Status: UCI Women's Team

Team name history
- 2008–2010 2011–2012 2013: Bourgogne Cyclisme Féminin; ASPTT Dijon–Bourgogne; Bourgogne Pro Dialog

Bourgogne Pro Dialog (UCI team code: BCF) was a French professional cycling team, which competed in elite road bicycle racing events such as the UCI Women's Road World Cup.

== Major wins ==
2012
Stage 4 Women's Tour of New Zealand, Emma Crum

== National champions ==
2013
France Road Race, Élise Delzenne
