= Meng Lang =

Chinese poet and dissident (1961–2018)

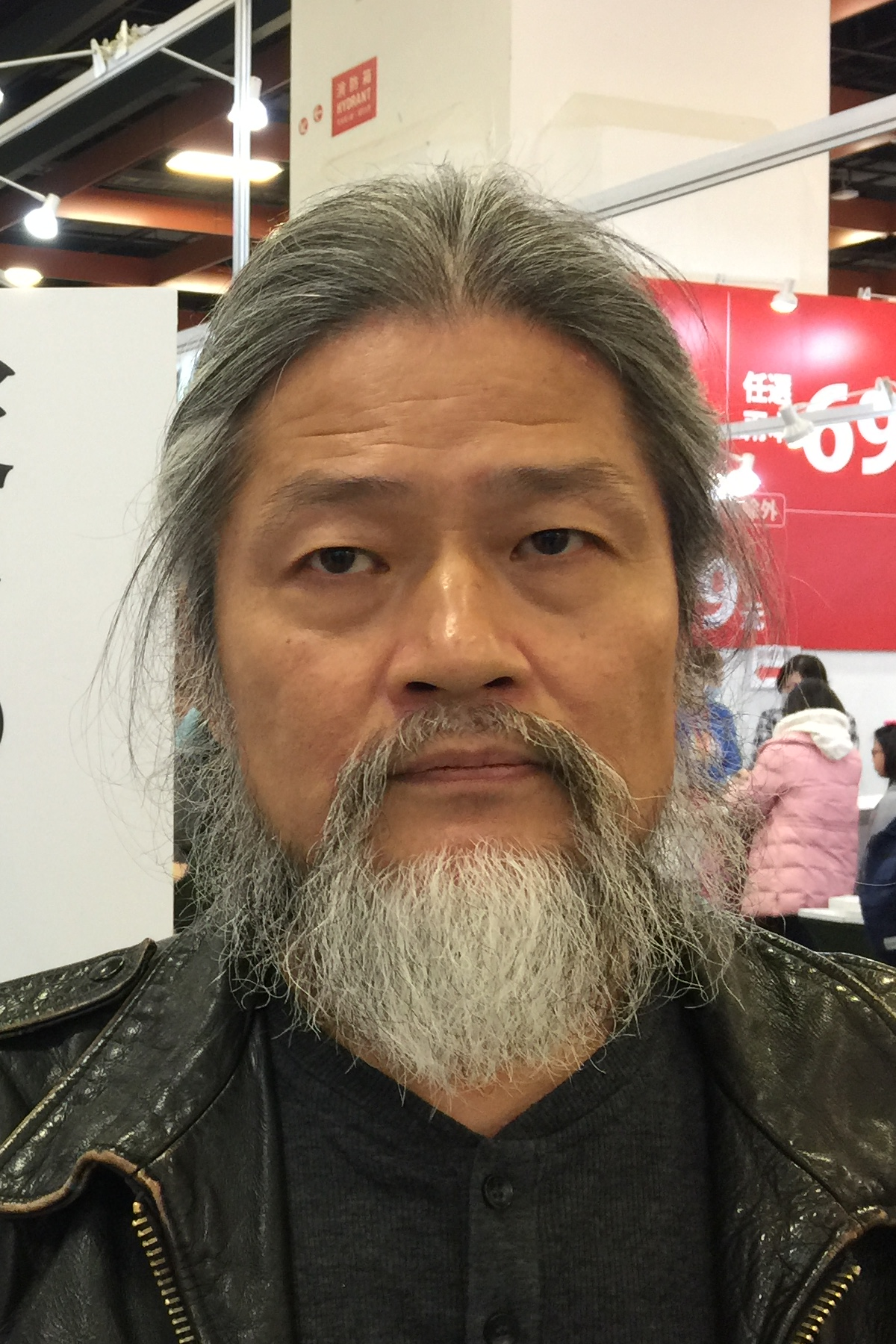
Meng Lang in 2018

Meng Lang (Chinese: 孟浪; 1961 – 12 December 2018) was a Chinese poet and dissident. He was a signatory of the human rights manifesto Charter 08 and a co-founder of the Independent Chinese PEN Center.

== Biography ==
Meng Lang was born in 1961 in Shanghai, China, with his ancestral home in Shaoxing, Zhejiang. His original name was Meng Junliang (孟俊良). In the 1980s, he was a participant in China's unofficial poetry movements and co-edited the anthology A Compendium of Modern Chinese Poetry, 1986–1988.

He moved to the United States and became a writer in residence at Brown University between 1995 and 1998. He later moved to Hong Kong in 2006. He was a signatory of Charter 08, a human rights manifesto co-authored by his former colleague Liu Xiaobo, and co-founded the Independent Chinese PEN Center in 2011. Following the arrest of several book publishers in Hong Kong, Meng and his wife Tu Chia-chi (杜家祁) moved to Hualien County, Taiwan in 2015.

Meng's poems have been published and translated into multiple languages. After the death of Liu Xiaobo in 2017, Meng published a poetry anthology in Taiwan in his memory the following year.

Meng returned to Hong Kong with his wife in February 2018, and fell ill soon afterwards. He was hospitalized and diagnosed with stage four lung cancer. On 12 December 2018, he died at Prince of Wales Hospital at the age of 57.
