= Gao Min (cyclist) =

Chinese cyclist

Personal information
- Full name: Gao Min
- Born: January 26, 1982 (age 44) Hebei, China
- Height: 1.60 m (5 ft 3 in)
- Weight: 56 kg (123 lb)

Cycling career
- Sport: Cycling
- Discipline: Road
- Role: Rider

Amateur teams
- 1998: Hebei Provincial Cycling Team
- 2003: National Team for Intensified Training

Gao Min (born 26 January 1982 in Hebei) is a Chinese road racing cyclist. She finished 16th in the Women's road race at the 2008 Summer Olympics.

== Palmarès ==
2002
3rd National Road Race Champions Tournament
2003
2nd National Road Race Champions Tournament
2007
2nd World B Class Road Race Championships
2008
1st Asian Road Race Championships
16th Road race, 2008 Summer Olympics
17th Road time trial, 2008 Summer Olympics
