= Jamie Wong =

Jamie Wong may refer to:

- Jamie Wong (cyclist)
- Jamie Wong (field hockey)
