= Liu Xin (cyclist) =

Chinese cyclist

Liu Xin (born 5 November 1986, Anda) is a Chinese road bicycle racer. She competed at the 2012 Summer Olympics in the Women's road race, but finished over the time limit.
