= 2010 UCI Women's Road World Rankings =

The 2010 UCI Women's Road Rankings is an overview of the UCI Women's Road Rankings, based upon the results in all UCI-sanctioned races of the 2010 women's road cycling season.

== Summary ==
Final result.

Top-ranked individual	Second-ranked individual	Third-ranked individual	Top-ranked team	Top-ranked nation
Marianne Vos (NED); Nederland Bloeit	Judith Arndt (GER); HTC Columbia Women	Kirsten Wild (NED); Cervelo Test Team	Cervelo Test Team	Netherlands

== Individual World Ranking (top 100) ==
Final result.

	Cyclists	Nation	Team	Age	Points
1	Marianne Vos	Netherlands	ARC	23	1,089.50
2	Judith Arndt	Germany	TCW	34	944.5
3	Kirsten Wild	Netherlands	CWT	28	919.75
4	Emma Johansson	Sweden	RSC	27	897.41
5	Emma Pooley	Great Britain	CWT	28	822.33
6	Annemiek van Vleuten	Netherlands	ARC	28	713.5
7	Ina Teutenberg	Germany	TCW	36	704
8	Giorgia Bronzini	Italy	GAU	27	598.5
9	Grace Verbeke	Belgium	LLT	26	409
10	Charlotte Becker	Germany	CWT	27	326.75
11	Olga Zabelinskaya	Russia	SAF	30	320
12	Nicole Cooke	Great Britain		27	316.25
13	Trixi Worrack	Germany	NUR	29	301
14	Shelley Evans	United States		30	298
15	Elizabeth Armitstead	Great Britain	CWT	22	263
16	Mara Abbott	United States		25	261.66
17	Rasa Leleivytė	Lithuania	SAF	22	254
18	Rochelle Gilmore	Australia	LLT	29	244
19	Claudia Häusler	Germany	CWT	25	240.08
20	Adrie Visser	Netherlands	TCW	27	227.16
21	Evelyn Stevens	United States	TCW	27	220.66
22	Amber Neben	United States		35	216
23	Ellen van Dijk	Netherlands	TCW	23	209.5
24	Monia Baccaille	Italy	VAD	26	207
25	Jeannie Longo-Ciprelli	France		52	195
26	Regina Bruins	Netherlands	CWT	24	193.08
27	Vicki Whitelaw	Australia	LLT	33	192
28	Martine Bras	Netherlands	GAU	32	188.5
29	Noemi Cantele	Italy	TCW	29	186
30	Ruth Corset	Australia	TIB	33	183.33
31	Tatiana Antoshina	Russia	VAD	28	171
32	Joëlle Numainville	Canada		23	167
33	Loes Gunnewijk	Netherlands	ARC	30	166.5
34	Linda Melanie Villumsen	New Zealand	TCW	25	152.16
35	Sarah Düster	Germany	CWT	28	151.75
36	Chantal Blaak	Netherlands	LNL	21	140.75
37	Tatiana Guderzo	Italy	VAD	26	138
38	Edita Pučinskaitė	Lithuania	GAU	35	132.5
39	Iris Slappendel	Netherlands	CWT	25	131.75
40	Liesbet De Vocht	Belgium	ARC	31	130
41	Sharon Laws	Great Britain	CWT	36	118.33
42	Anne Samplonius	Canada		42	102
43	Alessandra D'Ettorre	Italy	TOG	32	100
44	Carla Swart	South Africa	MTW	23	96
45	Eleonora Patuzzo	Italy	SAF	21	94
46	Grete Treier	Estonia	MIC	33	91
47	Tiffany Cromwell	Australia	LLT	22	89
48	Vera Koedooder	Netherlands		27	87
49	Andrea Bosman	Netherlands	LNL	31	86.75
50	Joanne Kiesanowski	New Zealand	TIB	31	84.33
51	Edwige Pitel	France	MIC	43	84
52	Chloe Hosking	Australia	TCW	20	82
53	Noortje Tabak	Netherlands	ARC	22	81.5
54	Yuliya Martisova	Russia	GAU	34	81.5
55	Lesya Kalytovska	Ukraine		22	80.25
56	Bridie O'Donnell	Australia	VAD	36	78
57	Sara Mustonen	Sweden	HPU	29	74.5
58	Aušrinė Trebaitė	Lithuania	SAF	22	72
59	Brooke Miller	United States	TIB	34	72
60	Angela Hennig	Germany	NUR	29	68
61	Emilia Fahlin	Sweden	TCW	22	66
62	You Jin A	South Korea		24	65
63	Kirsty Broun	Australia		31	63
64	Catherine Cheatley	New Zealand		27	63
65	Marie Lindberg	Sweden	RSC	23	62.41
66	Marta Tagliaferro	Italy	TOG	21	62
67	Alexandra Burchenkova	Russia	FEN	22	61
68	Tara Whitten	Canada		30	57
69	Rossella Callovi	Italy		19	53
70	Monique Van De Ree	Netherlands	LNL	22	53
71	Lylanie Lauwrens	South Africa	MTW	26	48
72	Elena Berlato	Italy	TOG	22	47.5
73	Petra Dijkman	Netherlands	RSC	31	45.91
74	Irene van den Broek	Netherlands	LNL	30	45.75
75	Patricia Schwager	Switzerland	CWT	27	43
76	Alyona Andruk	Ukraine	SAF	23	43
77	Theresa Cliff-Ryan	United States		32	42
78	Modesta Vžesniauskaitė	Lithuania		27	42
79	Christel Ferrier-Bruneau	France	FUT	31	42
80	Oxana Kozonchuk	Russia	SAF	22	41
81	Emma Trott	Great Britain		21	40.25
82	Natalya Stefanskaya	Kazakhstan		21	40
83	Carla Ryan	Australia	CWT	25	39
84	Christine Majerus	Luxembourg	ESG	23	38.75
85	Danielys García	Venezuela		24	38
86	Hanka Kupfernagel	Germany		36	38
87	Elena Kuchinskaya	Russia	GAU	26	38
88	Lauren Tamayo	United States		27	37
89	Andrea Graus	Austria		31	37
90	Alison Testroete	Canada		27	34
91	Natalia Boyarskaya	Russia	FEN	27	34
92	Valentina Carretta	Italy	TOG	21	33.5
93	Kataržina Sosna	Lithuania	VAI	20	33
94	Maaike Polspoel	Belgium	VLL	21	32
95	Dalila Rodríguez Hernandez	Cuba		22	32
96	Amber Halliday	Australia		31	31
97	Romy Kasper	Germany	NUR	22	31
98	Lise Olivier	South Africa		27	30
99	Urtė Juodvalkytė	Lithuania		24	30
100	Karen Fulton	New Zealand		39	30

== UCI Teams Ranking ==
This is the ranking of the UCI women's teams from 2010.
Final result.

	Team	Nation	Points
1	Cervelo Test Team	Netherlands	2,331.83
2	Nederland Bloeit	Netherlands	2,099.50
3	HTC Columbia Women	Germany	2,096.32
4	Redsun Cycling Team	Belgium	1,025.73
5	Gauss RDZ Ormu	Italy	1,001
6	Lotto Ladies Team	Belgium	934
7	Safi–Pasta Zara	Lithuania	740
8	Team Valdarno	Italy	594
9	Noris Cycling	Germany	403
10	TIBCO	United States	355.66
11	Leontien.nl	Netherlands	326.25
12	Top Girls Fassa Bortolo-Ghezzi	Italy	243
13	S.C. Michela Fanini Record Rox	Italy	204
14	MTN	South Africa	165
15	Fenixs–Petrogradets	Russia	143
16	Hitec Products UCK	Norway	137.5
17	ESGL 93–GSD Gestion	France	76
18	Vienne Futuroscope	France	71
19	Topsport Vlaanderen–Thompson	Belgium	66
20	Vaiano Solaristech	Italy	54
21	Alriksson–Go:Green	Sweden	35
22	ACS Chirio-Forno D'Asolo	Italy	30
23	Giant Pro Cycling	Hong Kong, China	17
24	Lointek	Spain	16
25	Debabarrena–Kirolgi	Spain	13
26	Bizkaia–Durango	Spain	10
27	Kuota Speed Kueens	Austria	4

== Nations Ranking (top 50) ==
Final result.

	Nation	Code	Points
1	Netherlands	NED	3,159.41
2	Germany	GER	2,516.33
3	Great Britain	GBR	1,560.16
4	Italy	ITA	1,229.50
5	Sweden	SWE	1,123.32
6	United States	USA	1,068.32
7	Australia	AUS	790.33
8	Russia	RUS	674.5
9	Belgium	BEL	609
10	Lithuania	LTU	533.5
11	Canada	CAN	376
12	France	FRA	372.75
13	New Zealand	NZL	351.49
14	South Africa	RSA	204
15	Ukraine	UKR	173.5
16	Estonia	EST	103
17	South Korea	KOR	103
18	Switzerland	SUI	90
19	Venezuela	VEN	79
20	Poland	POL	67
21	Luxembourg	LUX	58.75
22	Cuba	CUB	48
23	Norway	NOR	42
24	Japan	JPN	41
25	Austria	AUT	41
26	Kazakhstan	KAZ	40
27	Zimbabwe	ZIM	38
28	China	CHN	38
29	Belarus	BLR	35
30	Czech Republic	CZE	35
31	Thailand	THA	32
32	Hungary	HUN	30
32	Greece	GRE	30
32	Spain	ESP	30
32	Turkey	TUR	30
32	Serbia	SRB	30
32	Slovenia	SLO	30
32	Portugal	POR	30
39	Mexico	MEX	30
40	Ireland	IRL	28.75
41	Denmark	DEN	28
42	Costa Rica	CRC	28
43	Mongolia	MGL	27
44	Namibia	NAM	25
45	Finland	FIN	25
46	Malaysia	MAS	25
47	Romania	ROU	22
47	Belize	BIZ	22
49	Mauritius	MRI	21
50	Hong Kong, China	HKG	19

Preceded by 2009	UCI Women's Road Rankings; 2010	Succeeded by 2011
