= 2011 AA Drink–leontien.nl season =

2011 AA Drink–leontien.nl
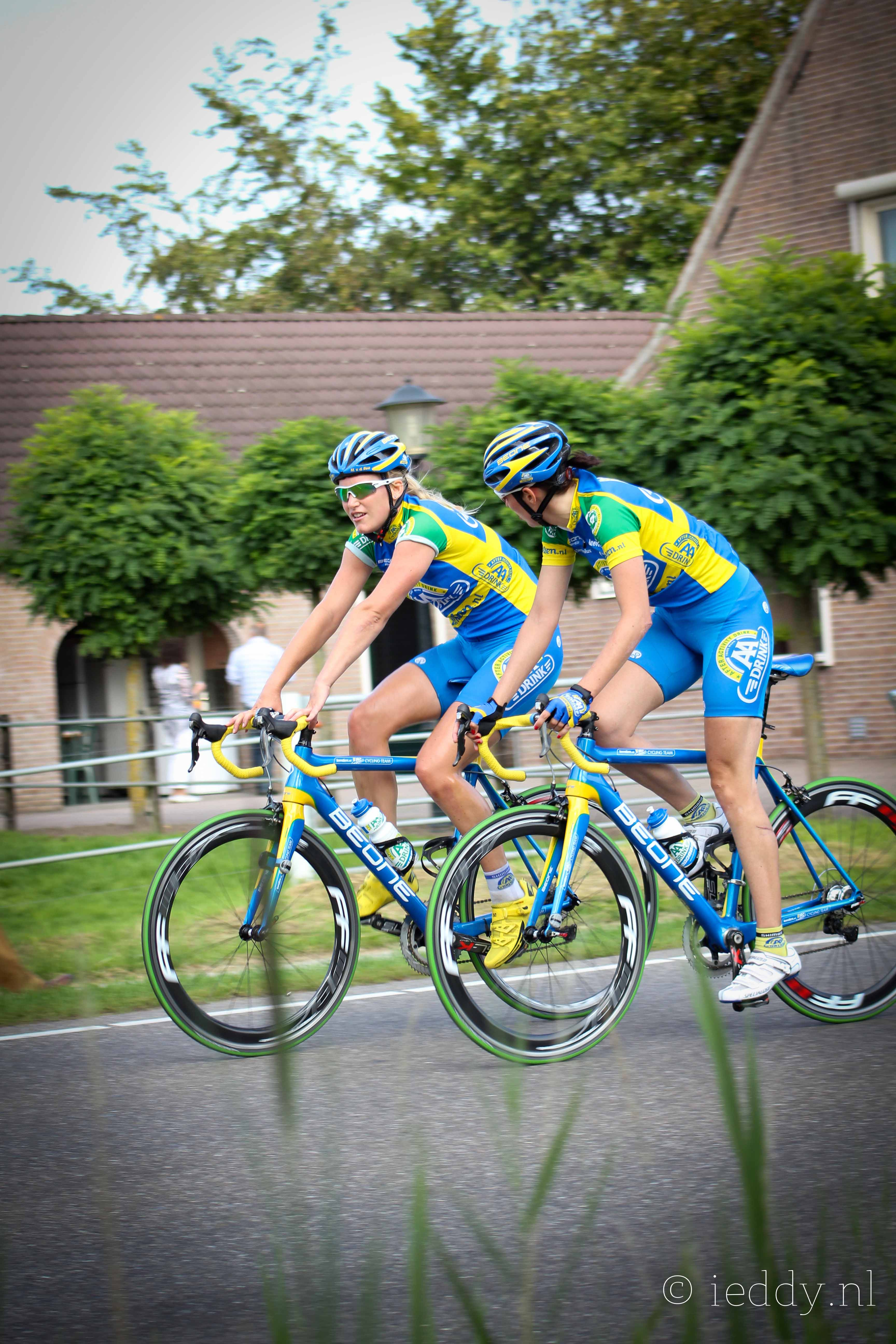
- UCI Team ranking: 5th

Season victories
- One-day races: Road cycling: 2 Track cycling: 4
- Stage race overall: 0
- Stage race stages: 2
- Best ranked rider: Kirsten Wild (10th)

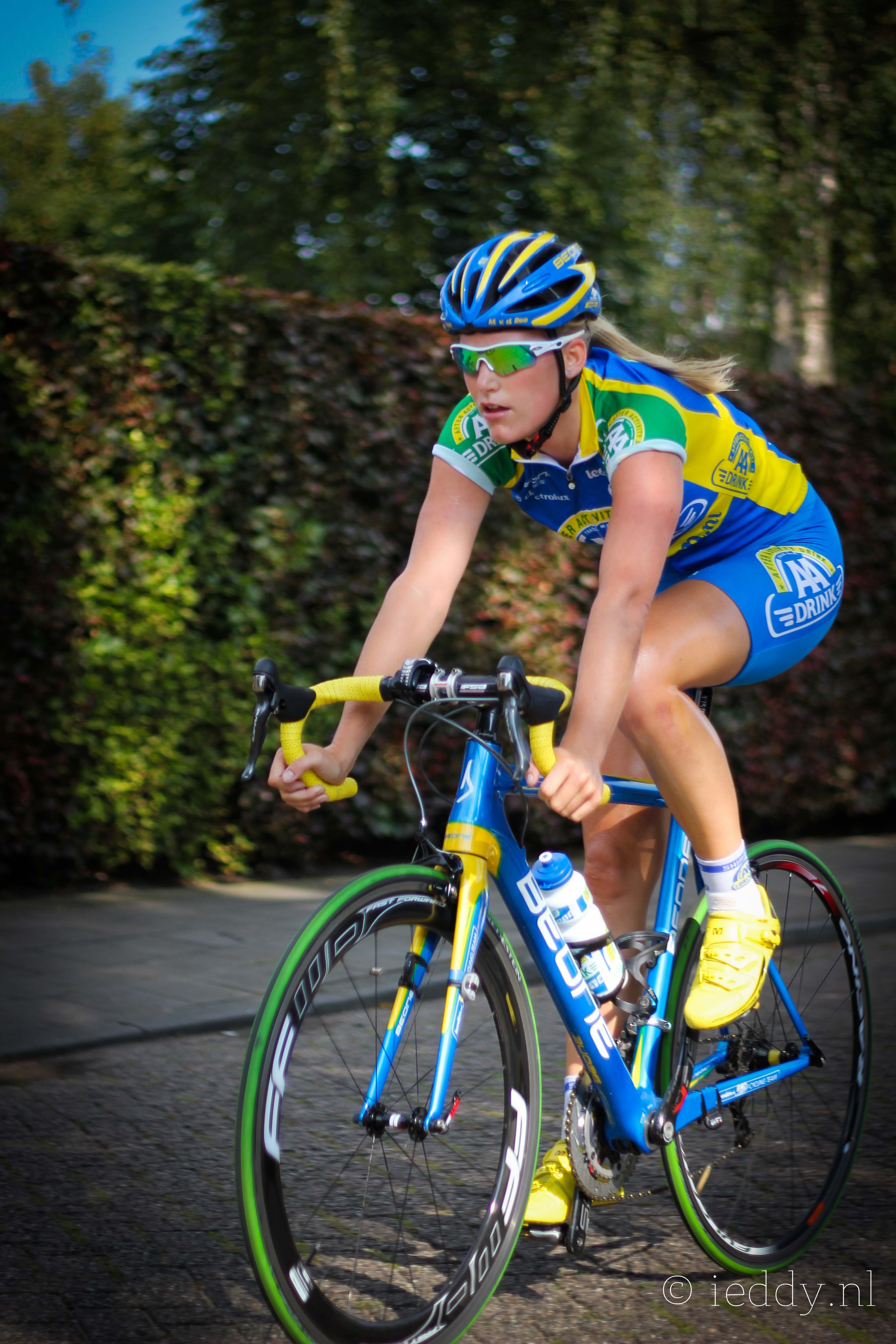
Monique van de Ree

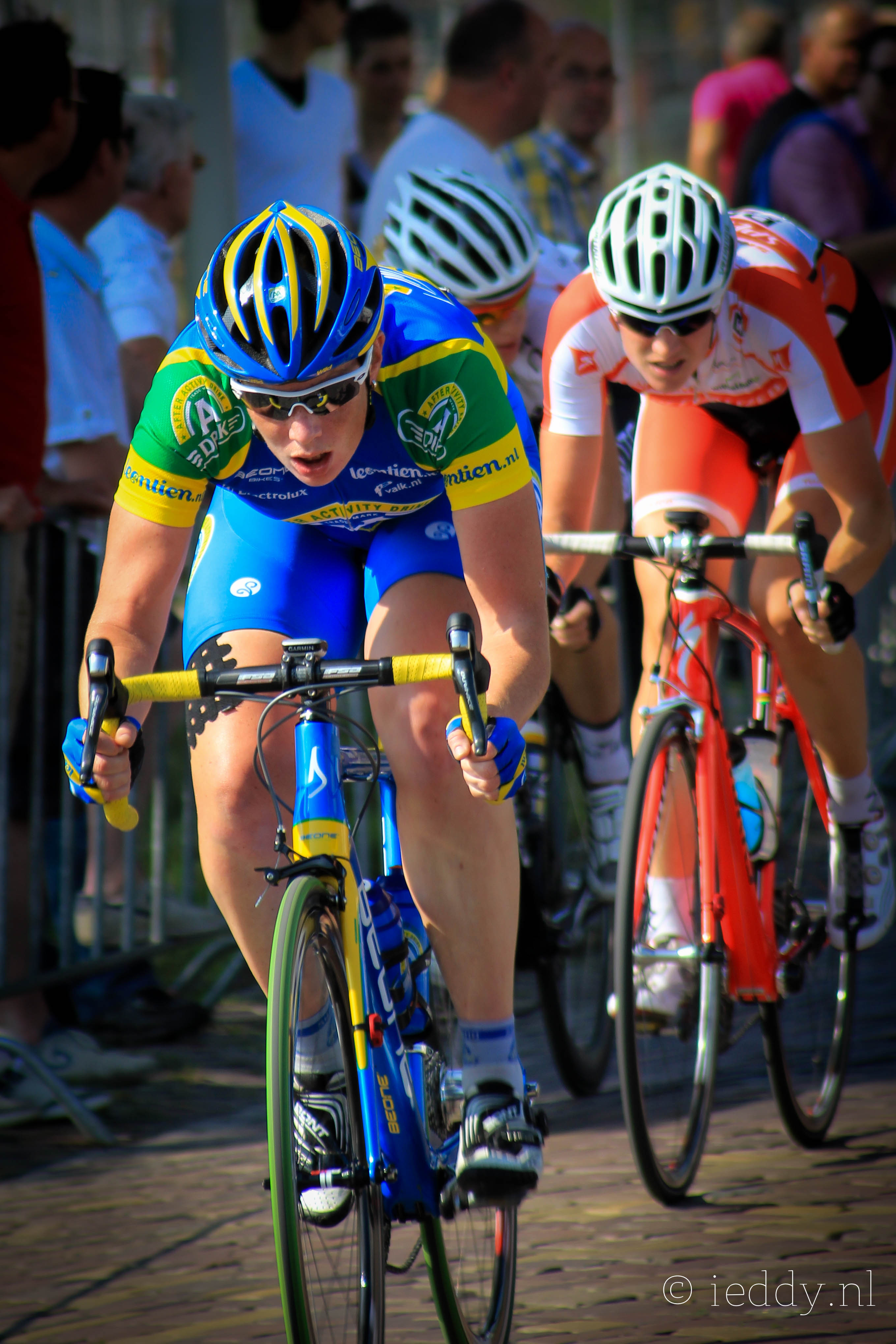
Kirsten Wild

The 2011 women's road cycling season was the seventh year for AA Drink–leontien.nl (UCI code: LNL), which began as Van Bemmelen–AA Drink in 2005.

== Roster ==
Ages as of 1 January 2011.

Rider	Date of birth
Chantal Blaak (NED)	October 22, 1989 (aged 21)
Lucinda Brand (NED)	July 2, 1989 (aged 21)
Eline De Roover (BEL)	April 4, 1992 (aged 18)
Marlen Jöhrend (GER)	January 2, 1986 (aged 24)
Willy Kanis (NED)	July 27, 1984 (aged 26)
Monique van de Ree (NED)	March 2, 1988 (aged 22)
Daphny van den Brand (NED)	April 6, 1978 (aged 32)
Irene van den Broek (NED)	August 26, 1980 (aged 30)

Rider	Date of birth
Heleen van Vliet (NED)	September 17, 1982 (aged 28)
Josien van Wingerden (NED)	September 22, 1987 (aged 23)
Linda Villumsen (NZL)	April 9, 1985 (aged 25)
Marijn de Vries (NED)	November 19, 1978 (aged 32)
Kirsten Wild (NED)	October 15, 1982 (aged 28)
Anne de Wildt (Until 22/6) (NED)
Trixi Worrack (GER)	September 28, 1981 (aged 29)

== Season victories ==
=== Road cycling ===
Single day and stage races 2011
Date	Nation	Race	Cat.	Winner
23 April	Netherlands	Omloop van Borsele	1.2	(Netherlands) Kirsten Wild
17 June	Netherlands	Stage 2 Rabo Ster Zweeuwsche Eilanden	2.2	(Netherlands) Chantal Blaak
6 August	Belgium	Erpe-Mere	1.2	(Netherlands) Chantal Blaak
17 September	Italy	Stage 6 Giro della Toscana Int. Femminile	2.2	(Germany) Trixi Worrack

=== Track cycling ===
World Cup races
Date	Nation	Race	Winner
4 November	Kazakhstan	2011–12 UCI Track Cycling World Cup – Round 1	(Netherlands) Kirsten Wild (Note: As part of the national selection) (with Ellen van Dijk and Amy Pieters)

National, Continental and World champions 2011
Date	Discipline	Jersey	Winner
27 December	Dutch Track Champion (points race)		Kirsten Wild
30 December	Dutch Track Champion (scratch)		Kirsten Wild
30 December	Dutch Track Champion (madison)		Kirsten Wild (with Ellen van Dijk)

== Other achievements ==
=== Dutch national record, team pursuit ===
Kirsten Wild, as part of the national team, broke twice together with Ellen van Dijk and Vera Koedooder or Amy Pieters the Dutch team pursuit record.

Time	Speed (km/h)	Cyclists	Event	Location of race	Date	Ref
3:23.179	53.155	Kirsten Wild (Note: As part of the national selection) (with Ellen van Dijk and Vera Koedooder)	2010–11 UCI Track Cycling World Cup Classics – Round 4 (qualifying)	(United Kingdom) Manchester	18 February 2011	
3:21.550	53.584	Kirsten Wild (Note: As part of the national selection) (with Ellen van Dijk and Amy Pieters)	2011–12 UCI Track Cycling World Cup – Round 1 (gold-medal race)	(Kazakhstan) Astana	4 November 2011	

== Results in major races ==
=== Single day races ===
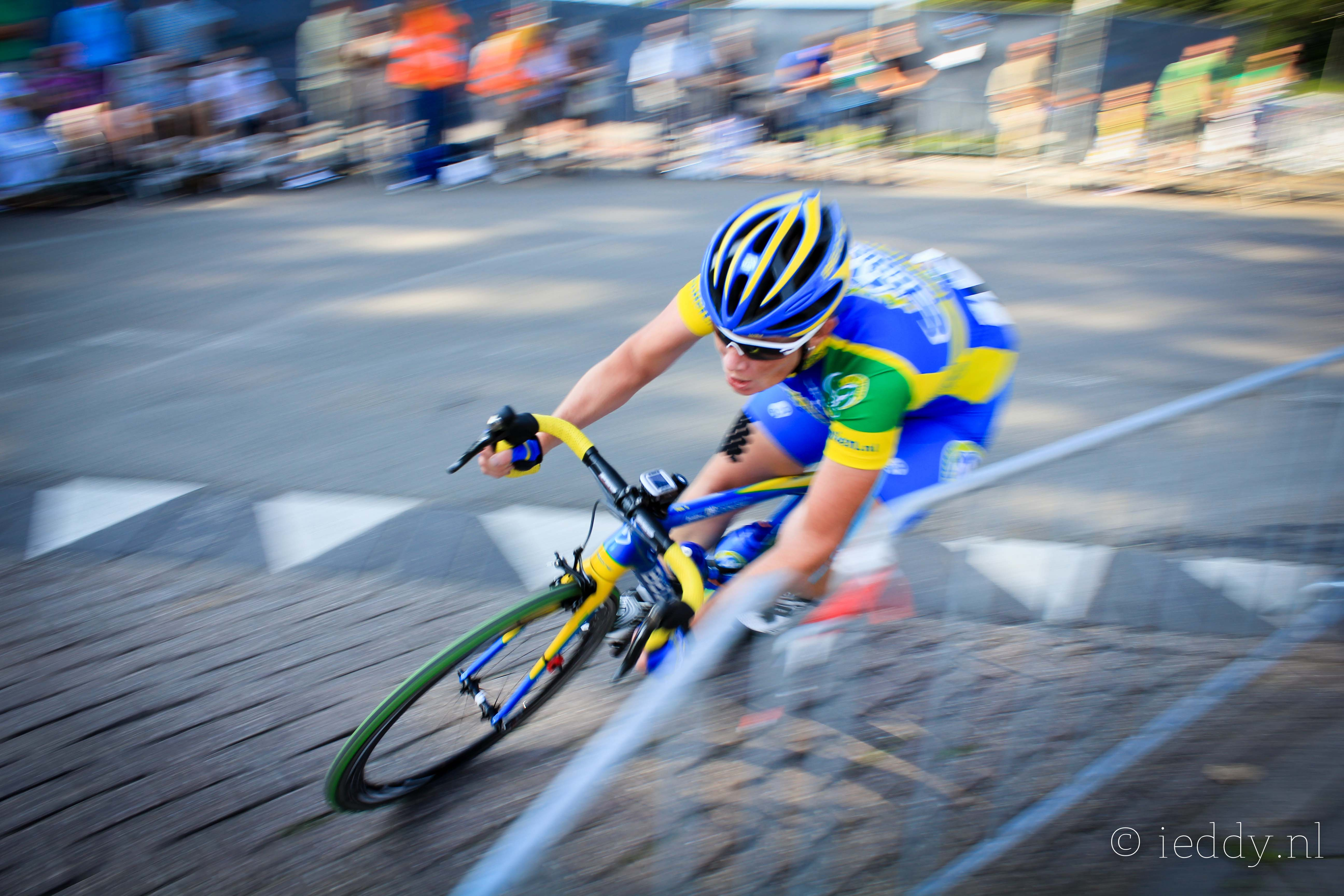
Fast cornering by Kirsten Wild

Results at the 2011 UCI Women's Road World Cup races
Date	#	Race	Best rider	Place
27 March	1	Trofeo Alfredo Binda-Comune di Cittiglio		
3 April	2	Tour of Flanders	(Netherlands) Kirsten Wild	17th
16 April	3	Ronde van Drenthe	(Netherlands) Kirsten Wild	2nd
20 April	4	La Flèche Wallonne Féminine		
15 May	5	Tour of Chongming Island		
5 June	6	GP Ciudad de Valladolid	(New Zealand) Linda Villumsen	9th
29 July	7	Open de Suède Vårgårda TTT	AA Drink–leontien.nl	2nd
31 July	8	Open de Suède Vårgårda	(Netherlands) Irene van den Broek	5th
27 August	9	GP de Plouay		
Final individual classification				
Final team classification			AA Drink–leontien.nl	

Other major single day races
Date	Race	Rider	Place
24 March	UCI Track Cycling World Championships – Women's team pursuit (Note: Riders are part of the national team)	(Netherlands) Kirsten Wild (with Ellen van Dijk and Vera Koedooder)	5th
27 March	UCI Track Cycling World Championships – Women's omnium (Note: Riders are part of the national team)	(Netherlands) Kirsten Wild	1st place, gold medalist(s)
20 September	UCI Road World Championships – Women's time trial (Note: Riders are part of the national team)	Linda Villumsen (NZL)	2nd place, silver medalist(s)
24 September	UCI Road World Championships – Women's road race (Note: Riders are part of the national team)	Trixi Worrack (GER)	64th

=== Grand Tours ===
Results of the team in the grand tours
Grand tour	Giro d'Italia Femminile
Rider (classification)	Lucinda Brand (15th)
Victories	0 stage win

== UCI World Ranking ==
The team finished fifth in the UCI ranking for teams.

Individual UCI World Ranking
Rank	Rider	Points
10	(Netherlands) Kirsten Wild	345
25	(Netherlands) Chantal Blaak	188
37	(New Zealand) Linda Villumsen	128
43	(Germany) Trixi Worrack	109
47	(Netherlands) Lucinda Brand	94
63	(Netherlands) Irene van den Broek	65
