= 2011 HTC–Highroad Women season =

2011 HTC–Highroad Women
- UCI Team ranking: 2nd
- Manager: Bob Stapleton

Season victories
- One-day races
- Stage race overall
- Best ranked rider: Judith Arndt (3rd)

The 2011 season was the tenth for the HTC–Highroad Women cycling team, which began as the T-Mobile team in 2003. The main new riders for the team were the Americans Amber Neben and Amanda Miller and the German time trial champion Charlotte Becker. In January, Carla Swart died whilst training after being hit by a truck. After winning a stage, Ellen van Dijk won the Ladies Tour of Qatar which was the 400th victory for the team (men's and women's) since 2008. Ina Teutenberg won the fifth round in the Women's World Cup and the team won the seventh round, the Open de Suède Vårgårda team time trial. The team finished second overall in the World Cup. Judith Arndt finished fourth in the individual standings and Teutenberg fifth. At the end of the season Arndt took the third place in the UCI World Ranking, Teutenberg fourth and the team ended in second place in the team classification.

== Roster ==
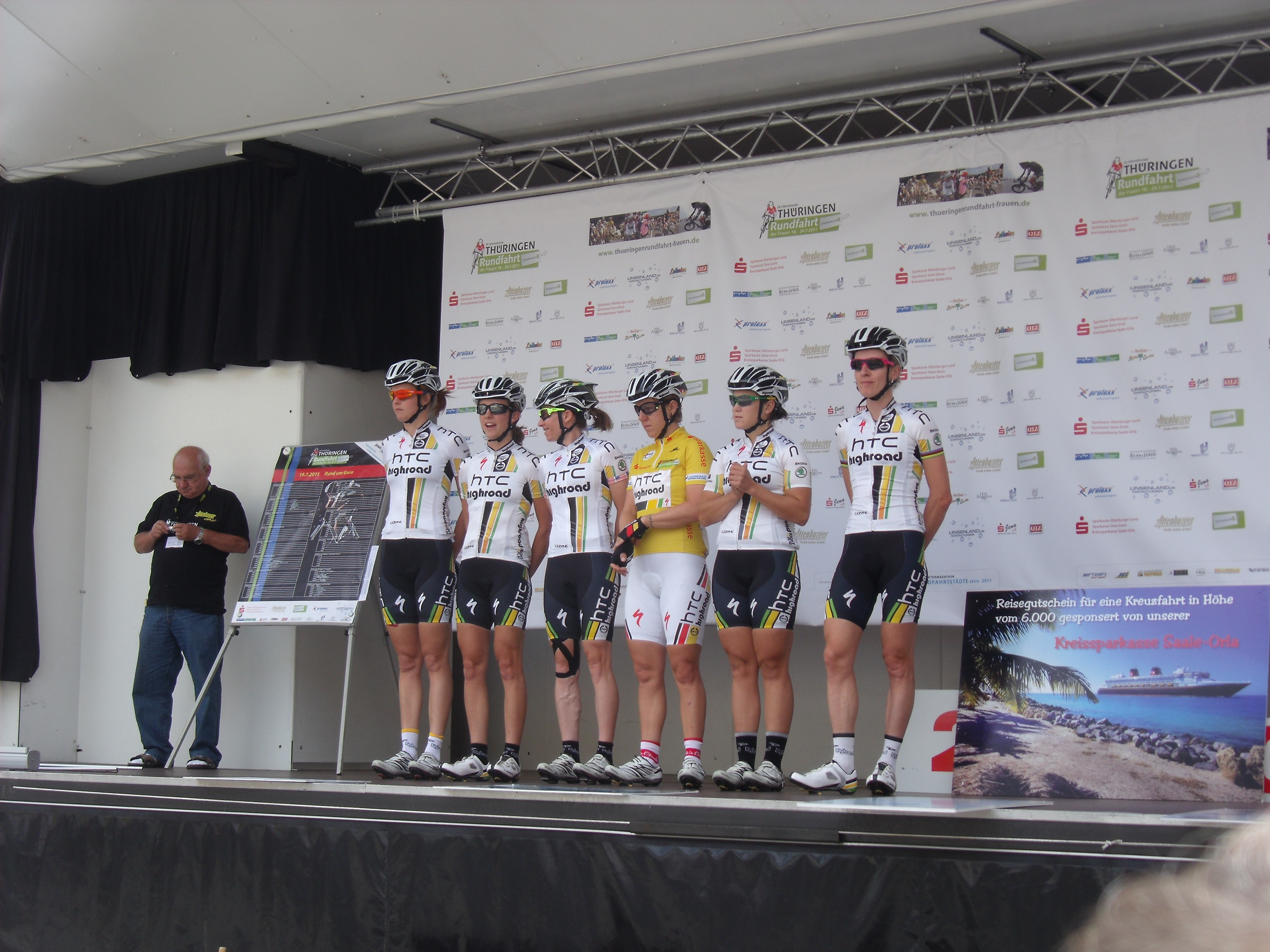
The team at the Thüringen-Rundfahrt der Frauen

Ages as of 1 January 2011.

Rider	Date of birth
Judith Arndt (GER)	July 23, 1976 (aged 34)
Charlotte Becker (GER)	May 19, 1983 (aged 27)
Katie Colclough (GBR)	January 20, 1990 (aged 20)
Ellen van Dijk (NED)	February 11, 1987 (aged 23)
Emilia Fahlin (SWE)	October 24, 1988 (aged 22)
Chloe Hosking (AUS)	October 1, 1990 (aged 20)
Amanda Miller (USA)	December 13, 1986 (aged 24)

Rider	Date of birth
Amber Neben (USA)	February 18, 1975 (aged 35)
Ally Stacher (USA)	June 8, 1981 (aged 29)
Evelyn Stevens (USA)	May 9, 1983 (aged 27)
Carla Swart (Note: Swart died on 19 January 2011.) (RSA)	November 26, 1987 (aged 23)
Ina-Yoko Teutenberg (GER)	October 28, 1974 (aged 36)
Adrie Visser (NED)	October 19, 1983 (aged 27)

Riders who joined the team for the 2011 season

Rider	2010 team
Charlotte Becker (GER)	Cervélo Lifeforce Pro Cycling Team
Katie Colclough (GBR)	
Amanda Miller (USA)	TIBCO–To The Top
Amber Neben (USA)	
Ally Stacher (USA)	Webcor
Carla Swart (RSA)	MTN Energade Ladies Teams

Riders who left the team during or after the 2010 season

Rider	2011 team
Kimberly Anderson (USA)	Retired
Noemi Cantele (ITA)	Cervélo Lifeforce Pro Cycling Team
Luise Keller (GER)	Retired
Linda Villumsen (NZL)	AA Drink–leontien.nl

== Season ==
=== February ===
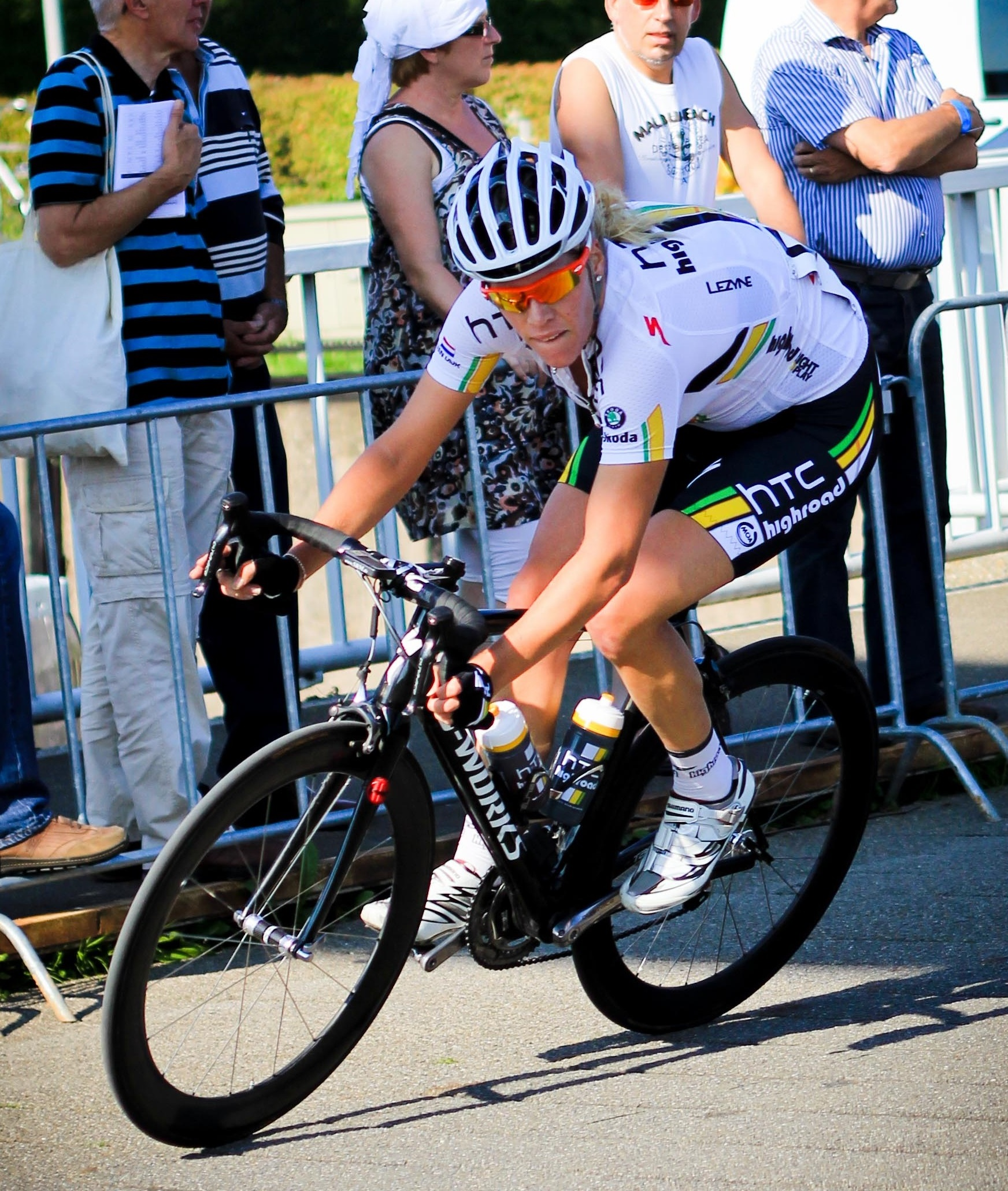
Ellen van Dijk in 2011

The season started for the team with the Ladies Tour of Qatar in February. In stage 2, Ellen van Dijk was part of the front group and took home the stage victory by winning the sprint. The day afterwards she defended successfully her leading position in the general classification and won the points classification as well. Van Dijk dedicated her victories to Carla Swart who died whilst training after being hit by a truck a few weeks earlier. The prize money she earned in Qatar was sent to her family. Van Dijk's victory was the 400th victory for the team (men's and women's) since 2008.

=== End of July – August ===
In late July the team won the world cup team time trial, the 2011 Open de Suède Vårgårda TTT and was over a minute faster than Team AA Drink. The team consisted of: Ellen van Dijk, Judith Arndt, Amber Neben and Charlotte Becker. The day afterwards was the World Cup road race in Sweden, the 2011 Open de Suède Vårgårda. Ellen van Dijk won the sprint of the peloton and finished second behind Annemiek van Vleuten, who had a small gap with the bunch. Teutenberg finished fourth.

Teutenberg won the first stage of the Trophée d'Or Féminin by winning the sprint and the team won the team time trial afterwards. Becker won the third stage. The leaders jersey was lost to Tatiana Antoshina after the fourth stage. In the fifth stage Teutenberg won the bunch sprint behind a breakaway of four riders. In the last stage Becker finished fourth but did not win enough time to win the overall classification and finished second.

=== September ===
At the Profile Ladies Tour, Ina Teutenberg finished second in the first stage. The day afterwards Ellen van Dijk won for the third consecutive year the time trial stage of this tour. At the same time the Tour Cycliste Féminin International de l'Ardèche took place. Emilia Fahlin won the prologue and the day afterwards the time trial as well. She lost however thirteen minutes on Emma Pooley in the thirds stage. Evelyn Stevens won stage 4 with over a four minutes lead over teammate Amanda Miller. Fahlin won the two stages afterwards. After finishing again second in the time trial, Miller finished fourth in the general classification.

In preparation for the time trial world championships, Arndt won the Chrono Champenois just ahead of Amber Neben.

At the Giro della Toscana Int. Femminile the team won once again the team time trial. Arndt won the sprint of the second stage and took the leaders jersey. The stage afterwards the team provided Arndt on the final climb with a train so she could also win that stage. After Teutenberg won the stage afterwards and Arndt the time trial the next morning the team booked five consecutive victories. In the fourth stage where Teutenberg abandoned, Megan Guarnier took the lead. In the fifth stage also Teutenberg abandoned. In the last stage Charlotte Becker won the stage by winning the bunch sprint.

=== End of September: UCI Road World Championships ===
Judith Arndt won, at the age of 35, the time trial at the UCI Road World Championships. Linda Villumsen won the silver medal, Emma Pooley finished third. Ina Teutenberg won bronze in the road race and Chloe Hosking finished sixth.

=== October – December ===
To the end of the road cycling season, Amber Neben won the Chrono des Nations in October.

At the Dutch National Track Championships in December, Ellen van Dijk won two national titles. She won the individual pursuit as well as the madison.

== Results ==
=== Season victories ===
Single day and stage races 2011
Date	Nation	Race	Cat.	Winner
3 February	Qatar	Stage 2 Ladies Tour of Qatar	2.1	(Netherlands) Ellen van Dijk
4 February	Qatar	General classification Ladies Tour of Qatar	2.1	(Netherlands) Ellen van Dijk
4 February	Qatar	Points classification Ladies Tour of Qatar	2.1	(Netherlands) Ellen van Dijk
23 February	New Zealand	Stage 1 Women's Tour of New Zealand	2.2	(Germany) Judith Arndt
24 February	New Zealand	Stage 2 Women's Tour of New Zealand	2.2	(Germany) Judith Arndt
25 February	New Zealand	Stage 3 Women's Tour of New Zealand	2.2	(Germany) Ina-Yoko Teutenberg
27 February	New Zealand	Stage 5 Women's Tour of New Zealand	2.2	(United States) Amanda Miller
27 February	New Zealand	General classification Women's Tour of New Zealand	2.2	(Germany) Judith Arndt
8 April	Netherlands	Stage 2 Energiewacht Tour	2.2	(Germany) Ina-Yoko Teutenberg
9 April	Netherlands	Stage 3 Energiewacht Tour	2.2	(Netherlands) Adrie Visser
10 April	Netherlands	General classification Energiewacht Tour	2.2	(Netherlands) Adrie Visser
17 April	Netherlands	Ronde van Gelderland	1.2	(Germany) Ina-Yoko Teutenberg
24 April	Belgium	GP Stad Roeselare	1.1	(United States) Amber Neben
12 May	China	Stage 2 Tour of Chongming Island	2.1	(Germany) Ina-Yoko Teutenberg
13 May	China	Stage 3 Tour of Chongming Island	2.1	(Australia) Chloe Hosking
13 May	China	Classement à points du Tour of Chongming Island	2.1	(Germany) Ina-Yoko Teutenberg
13 May	China	General classification Tour of Chongming Island	2.1	(Germany) Ina-Yoko Teutenberg
15 May	China	Tour of Chongming Island World Cup	CDM	(Germany) Ina-Yoko Teutenberg
17 June	Italy	Stage 1 Giro del Trentino Alto Adige-Südtirol	2.1	(Germany) Ina-Yoko Teutenberg
18 June	Italy	Stage 2 Giro del Trentino Alto Adige-Südtirol	2.1	(Germany) Judith Arndt
18 June	Italy	General classification Giro del Trentino Alto Adige-Südtirol	2.1	(Germany) Judith Arndt
4 July	Italy	Stage 4 Giro d'Italia Femminile	2.1	(Germany) Ina-Yoko Teutenberg
10 July	Italy	10th stage Giro d'Italia Femminile	2.1	(Germany) Ina-Yoko Teutenberg
18 July	Germany	Stage 1 Thüringen Rundfahrt der Frauen	2.1	HTC–Highroad Women
19 July	Germany	Stage 2 Thüringen Rundfahrt der Frauen	2.1	(Germany) Ina-Yoko Teutenberg
21 July	Germany	Stage 4 Thüringen Rundfahrt der Frauen	2.1	(United States) Amanda Miller
23 July	Germany	Stage 6 Thüringen Rundfahrt der Frauen	2.1	(Germany) Judith Arndt
29 July	Sweden	Open de Suède Vårgårda TTT	CDM	HTC–Highroad Women
31 July	Germany	Sparkassen Giro Bochum	1.1	(Netherlands) Adrie Visser
20 August	France	Stage 1 Trophée d'Or Féminin	2.2	(Germany) Ina-Yoko Teutenberg
21 August	France	Stage 1 Trophée d'Or Féminin	2.2	HTC–Highroad Women
4 September	Italy	Memorial Davide Fardelli – Cronometro Individuale	1.2	(Germany) Judith Arndt
7 September	Netherlands	Stage 2 Holland Ladies Tour	2.2	(Netherlands) Ellen van Dijk
7 September	France	Stage 2 Tour Cycliste Féminin International de l'Ardèche	2.2	(Sweden) Emilia Fahlin
9 September	France	Stage 5 Tour Cycliste Féminin International de l'Ardèche	2.2	(Sweden) Emilia Fahlin
10 September	France	Stage 6 Tour Cycliste Féminin International de l'Ardèche	2.2	(Sweden) Emilia Fahlin
8 September	France	Stage 4 Tour Cycliste Féminin International de l'Ardèche	2.2	(United States) Evelyn Stevens
11 September	France	Chrono Champenois	1.1	(Germany) Judith Arndt
13 September	Italy	Stage 1 Giro della Toscana Int. Femminile – Memorial Michela Fanini	2.1	HTC–Highroad Women
14 September	Italy	Stage 2 Giro della Toscana Int. Femminile – Memorial Michela Fanini	2.1	(Germany) Ina-Yoko Teutenberg
16 September	Italy	Stage 4a Giro della Toscana Int. Femminile – Memorial Michela Fanini	2.1	(Germany) Ina-Yoko Teutenberg
15 September	Italy	Stage 3 Giro della Toscana Int. Femminile – Memorial Michela Fanini	2.1	(Germany) Judith Arndt
16 September	Italy	Stage 4b Giro della Toscana Int. Femminile – Memorial Michela Fanini	2.1	(Germany) Judith Arndt
18 September	Italy	Stage 6 Giro della Toscana Int. Femminile – Memorial Michela Fanini	2.1	(Germany) Charlotte Becker
16 October	France	Chrono des Nations	1.1	(United States) Amber Neben

Track Cycling World Cup races
Date	Nation	Race	Winner
4 November	Kazakhstan	2011–12 UCI Track Cycling World Cup – Round 1	(Netherlands) Ellen van Dijk (Note: As part of the national selection) (with Kirsten Wild and Amy Pieters)

National, Continental and World champions 2011
Date	Discipline	Jersey	Winner
22 June	Swedish National Time Trial Championships		Emilia Fahlin
23 June	United States National Time Trial Championships		Evelyn Stevens
24 June	German National Time Trial Championships		Judith Arndt
26 June	German National Road Race Championships		Ina-Yoko Teutenberg
16 September	Time Trial World Champion		Judith Arndt
28 December	Dutch Track Champion (individual pursuit)		Ellen van Dijk
30 December	Dutch Track Champion (madison)		Ellen van Dijk

== Results in major races ==
=== Single day races ===
Judith Arndt finished 4th in the final classification and Ina-Yoko Teutenberg 5th. The team finished 2nd in the teams standing.

Results at the 2011 UCI Women's Road World Cup races
Date	#	Race	Best rider	Place
27 March	1	Trofeo Alfredo Binda-Comune di Cittiglio	(Germany) Judith Arndt	7th
3 April	2	Tour of Flanders	(Germany) Judith Arndt	5th
16 April	3	Ronde van Drenthe	(Germany) Ina-Yoko Teutenberg	4th
20 April	4	La Flèche Wallonne Féminine	(Germany) Judith Arndt	3rd
15 May	5	Tour of Chongming Island	(Germany) Ina-Yoko Teutenberg	1st
5 June	6	GP Ciudad de Valladolid	(Germany) Judith Arndt	4th
29 July	7	Open de Suède Vårgårda TTT	HTC–Highroad Women	1st
31 July	8	Open de Suède Vårgårda	(Netherlands) Ellen van Dijk	2nd
27 August	9	GP de Plouay	(United States) Evelyn Stevens	2nd
Final individual classification			(Germany) Judith Arndt	4th
Final team classification			HTC–Highroad Women	2nd

Other major single day races
Date	Race	Rider	Place
24 March	UCI Track Cycling World Championships – Women's team pursuit (Note: Riders are part of the national team)	(Netherlands) Ellen van Dijk (with Kirsten Wild and Vera Koedooder)	5th
25 March	UCI Track Cycling World Championships – Women's individual pursuit (Note: Riders are part of the national team)	(Netherlands) Ellen van Dijk	5th
20 September	UCI Road World Championships – Women's time trial (Note: Riders are part of the national team)	Judith Arndt (GER)	1st place, gold medalist(s)
24 September	UCI Road World Championships – Women's road race (Note: Riders are part of the national team)	Ina-Yoko Teutenberg (GER)	2nd place, silver medalist(s)
21 October	European Track Championships – Women's team pursuit (Note: Riders are part of the national team)	(Netherlands) Ellen van Dijk (with Kirsten Wild and Vera Koedooder)	5th

=== Grand Tours ===
Results of the team in the grand tours
Grand tour	Giro d'Italia Femminile
Rider (classification)	Judith Arndt (3rd)
Victories	2 stage wins

== UCI World Ranking ==
The team finished second in the UCI ranking for teams.

Individual UCI World Ranking
Rank	Rider	Points
3	(Germany) Judith Arndt	951
4	(Germany) Ina-Yoko Teutenberg	791
8	(United States) Amber Neben	383
13	(Netherlands) Ellen van Dijk	269
15	(Netherlands) Charlotte Becker	258
17	(Netherlands) Adrie Visser	255
24	(Australia) Chloe Hosking	190
41	(United States) Evelyn Stevens	119
53	(Sweden) Emilia Fahlin	80
65	(United States) Amanda Miller	62
180	(United Kingdom) Katie Colclough	12
