= 2011 Sparkassen Giro =

2011 Sparkassen Giro Bochum
Race details
- Dates: 31 July
- Stages: 1
- Distance: 73 km (45.36 mi)
- Winning time: 2h 18' 52"

Results
	Winner	Adrie Visser (NED)	(HTC–Highroad Women)
	Second	Christine Majerus (LUX)	(Team GSD Gestion)
	Third	Liesbet De Vocht (BEL)	(Belgium national team)

The women's race of the 2011 Sparkassen Giro Bochum took place on 31 July 2011. It was the 11th women's edition of the Sparkassen Giro Bochum. The race started and ended in Bochum, Germany and spanned 73 km (45.4 mi). The race is a UCI 1.1 category race.

Ellen van Dijk, who won the race at the 2010 Sparkassen Giro Bochum, did not participate in this edition.

== Results ==
	Cyclist	Team	Time
1	Adrie Visser (NED)	HTC–Highroad Women	2h 18' 52"
2	Christine Majerus (LUX)	Team GSD Gestion	s.t.
3	Liesbet De Vocht (BEL)	Belgium national team	s.t.
4	Hanka Kupfernagel (GER)	Horizon Fitness Racing Team	s.t.
5	Alessandra D'Ettorre (ITA)	Colavita-Forno d'Asolo	s.t.
6	Hanna Amend (GER)	Team Stevens-Redvil	+ 2"
7	Suzanne de Goede (NED)	Skil Koga	+ 10"
8	Giorgia Bronzini (ITA)	Colavita-Forno d'Asolo	+ 10"
9	Chloe Hosking (AUS)	HTC–Highroad Women	+ 10"
10	Nathalie Lamborelle (LUX)	Abus-Nutrixxion	+ 10"
