= 2011 UCI Women's Road World Rankings =

The 2011 UCI Women's Road Rankings is an overview of the UCI Women's Road Rankings, based upon the results in all UCI-sanctioned races of the 2011 women's road cycling season.

== Summary ==
Final result.

Top-ranked individual	Second-ranked individual	Third-ranked individual	Top-ranked team	Top-ranked nation
Marianne Vos (NED); Nederland Bloeit	Emma Johansson (SWE); Hitec Products–UCK	Judith Arndt (GER); HTC–Highroad Women	Nederland Bloeit	Netherlands

== Individual World Ranking (top 100) ==
Final result.

	Cyclists	Nation	Team	Age	Points
1	Marianne Vos	Netherlands	ARC	24	1,735
2	Emma Johansson	Sweden	HPU	28	1,130
3	Judith Arndt	Germany	TCW	35	951
4	Ina Teutenberg	Germany	TCW	37	791
5	Annemiek van Vleuten	Netherlands	ARC	29	674
6	Giorgia Bronzini	Italy	FCL	28	523
7	Emma Pooley	Great Britain	CWT	29	514
8	Amber Neben	United States	TCW	36	383
9	Elizabeth Armitstead	Great Britain	CWT	23	365.5
10	Kirsten Wild	Netherlands	LNL	29	345
11	Tatiana Antoshina	Russia	GAU	29	320.5
12	Rasa Leleivytė	Lithuania	VAI	23	292
13	Ellen van Dijk	Netherlands	TCW	24	269
14	Nicole Cooke	Great Britain	MCG	28	269
15	Charlotte Becker	Germany	TCW	28	258
16	Martine Bras	Netherlands	DLT	33	258
17	Adrie Visser	Netherlands	TCW	28	255
18	Clara Hughes	Canada		39	212
19	Grace Verbeke	Belgium	VLL	27	211
20	Liesbet De Vocht	Belgium	VLL	32	211
21	Christine Majerus	Luxembourg	GSD	24	200
22	Monia Baccaille	Italy	MCG	27	197.25
23	Shara Gillow	Australia	BPD	24	191
24	Chloe Hosking	Australia	TCW	21	190
25	Chantal Blaak	Netherlands	LNL	22	188
26	Yuliya Martisova	Russia	GAU	35	182.5
27	Joëlle Numainville	Canada	TIB	24	176
28	Svetlana Bubnenkova	Russia		38	165.75
29	Rochelle Gilmore	Australia	LHT	30	159
30	Noemi Cantele	Italy	CWT	30	154
31	Tatiana Guderzo	Italy	MCG	27	153.25
32	Ludivine Henrion	Belgium	LHT	27	152
33	Shelley Olds	United States	DPZ	31	143
34	Megan Guarnier	United States	TIB	26	141
35	Larisa Pankova	Russia		20	139
36	Loes Gunnewijk	Netherlands	ARC	31	135
37	Linda Villumsen	New Zealand	LNL	26	128
38	Rossella Callovi	Italy	MCG	20	122
39	Alexandra Burchenkova	Russia		23	119
40	Ashleigh Moolman	South Africa	LHT	26	119
40	Ashleigh Moolman	South Africa	LHT	26	119
41	Evelyn Stevens	United States	TCW	28	119
42	Claudia Häusler	Germany	DPZ	26	116
43	Trixi Worrack	Germany	LNL	30	109
44	Olga Zabelinskaya	Russia	DPZ	31	107
45	Christel Ferrier-Bruneau	France	GAU	32	103
46	Natalia Boyarskaya	Russia		28	99.75
47	Lucinda Brand	Netherlands	LNL	22	94
48	Sofie De Vuyst	Belgium	LHT	24	92
49	Aude Biannic	France		20	92
50	Iris Slappendel	Netherlands	CWT	26	89.5
51	Sara Mustonen	Sweden	HPU	30	87
52	Amanda Spratt	Australia		24	85
53	Emilia Fahlin	Sweden	TCW	23	80
54	Theresa Cliff-Ryan	United States	FCL	33	80
55	Pauline Ferrand-Prévot	France		19	76
56	Alexis Rhodes	Australia	CWT	27	73
57	Alyona Andruk	Ukraine	DPZ	24	73
58	Valentina Scandolara	Italy	GAU	21	70
59	Grete Treier	Estonia	MIC	34	69
60	Alena Amialiusik	Belarus		22	69
61	Evelyn García	El Salvador		29	69
62	Elena Berlato	Italy	TOG	23	66
63	Irene van den Broek	Netherlands	LNL	31	65
64	Karol-Ann Canuel	Canada	FUT	23	64
65	Amanda Miller	United States	TCW	25	62
66	Mei Yu Hsiao	Chinese Taipei		26	60
67	Hanna Solovey	Ukraine		19	59
68	Rhae-Christie Shaw	Canada		36	59
69	Kristin Armstrong	United States		38	58
70	Hanka Kupfernagel	Germany		37	58
71	Lise Nøstvold	Norway	HPU	24	58
72	Amy Pieters	Netherlands		20	56
73	Sharon Laws	Great Britain	CWT	37	54
74	Catherine Cheatley	New Zealand	FCL	28	52
75	Cherise Taylor	South Africa	LHT	22	50
76	Andrea Bosman	Netherlands		32	50
77	Sarah Düster	Germany	ARC	29	50
78	Ruth Corset	Australia	BPD	34	49
79	Belinda Goss	Australia		27	49
80	Sylwia Kapusta	Poland	GAU	29	48.5
81	Jeannie Longo-Ciprelli	France		53	48
82	Evelyn Arys	Belgium		21	48
83	Tara Whitten	Canada	TIB	31	48
84	Polona Batagelj	Slovenia	BPD	22	47
85	Pia Sundstedt	Finland		36	46
86	Denise Ramsden	Canada	JSD	21	42
87	Isabelle Söderberg	Sweden	AGG	22	42
88	Vicki Whitelaw	Australia	LHT	34	41
89	Carla Ryan	Australia	CWT	26	40.5
90	Robin Farina	United States		34	40
91	Aizhan Zhaparova	Russia		22	40
92	Winanda Spoor	Netherlands	DLT	20	40
93	Jutatip Maneephan	Thailand		23	40
94	Gu Sung Eun	South Korea		27	40
95	Leah Kirchmann	Canada		21	40
96	Bridie O'Donnell	Australia	TOG	37	35
97	Nathalie Lamborelle	Luxembourg	NXX	23	35
98	Elisa Longo Borghini	Italy	TOG	20	34
99	Yulia Iliynikh	Russia		26	33
100	Andrea Dvorak	United States	FCL	31	32

== UCI Teams Ranking ==
This is the ranking of the UCI women's teams from 2011.
Final result.

	Team	Nation	Code	Points
1	Nederland Bloeit	Netherlands	ARC	2,594
2	HTC–Highroad Women	United States	TCW	2,394
3	Hitec Products–UCK	Norway	HPU	1,302
4	Garmin–Cervélo	Great Britain	CWT	1,123
5	AA Drink–leontien.nl	Netherlands	LNL	770
6	Sc Mcipollini Giambenini	Italy	MCG	741.5
7	Colavita Forno d'Asolo	Italy	FCL	687
8	Gauss RDZ Ormu	Italy	GAU	676
9	Lotto Honda Team	Belgium	LHT	522
10	TopSport Vlaanderen 2012–Ridley Team	Belgium	VLL	464
11	Diadora–Pasta Zara	United States	DPZ	439
12	TIBCO–To The Top	United States	TIB	395
13	Dolmans Landscaping Team	Netherlands	DLT	346
14	Vaiano Solaristech	Italy	VAI	334
15	Bizkaia–Durango	Spain	BPD	289
16	Team GSD Gestion	France	GSD	215
17	Top Girls Fassa Bortolo	Italy	TOG	160
18	Vienne Futuroscope	France	FUT	112
19	S.C. Michela Fanini Rox	Italy	MIC	104
20	Abus–Nutrixxion	Germany	NXX	98
21	Alriksson–Go:Green	Sweden	AGG	83
22	Juvederm–Specialized	Canada	JSD	65
23	Kuota Speed Kueens	Austria	KSK	31
24	Kleo Ladies Team	Italy	KLT	20
25	Lointek	Spain	LTK	19
26	China Chongming–Giant Pro Cycling	Hong Kong, China	GPC	10
27	Debabarrena–Gipuzkoa	Spain	DEB	8
28	Asptt Dijon–Bourgogne	France	BCF	3

== Nations Ranking (top 50) ==
Final result.

	Nation	Code	Points
1	Netherlands	NED	3,281
2	Germany	GER	2,225
3	Sweden	SWE	1,369
4	Great Britain	GBR	1,234.50
5	Italy	ITA	1,149.50
6	Russia	RUS	926.75
7	United States	USA	866
8	Belgium	BEL	714
9	Australia	AUS	698
10	Canada	CAN	559
11	Lithuania	LTU	370
12	France	FRA	343
13	Luxembourg	LUX	245
14	South Africa	RSA	208
15	New Zealand	NZL	204
16	Ukraine	UKR	186
17	Poland	POL	105.5
18	Norway	NOR	103
19	Estonia	EST	86
20	Belarus	BLR	86
20	El Salvador	ESA	86
22	South Korea	KOR	74
23	Thailand	THA	70
24	Slovenia	SLO	65
25	Finland	FIN	63
26	Chinese Taipei	TPE	60
27	Switzerland	SUI	57
28	Venezuela	VEN	57
29	Brazil	BRA	47
30	Mauritius	MRI	43
31	Denmark	DEN	40
32	Japan	JPN	39
33	Portugal	POR	30
33	Turkey	TUR	30
33	Israel	ISR	30
33	Zimbabwe	ZIM	30
33	Mongolia	MGL	30
33	Greece	GRE	30
33	Ireland	IRL	30
33	Czech Republic	CZE	30
41	Spain	ESP	30
42	Mexico	MEX	28
43	Vietnam	VIE	27
44	Malaysia	MAS	25
45	Austria	AUT	22
46	Romania	ROU	21
47	Serbia	SRB	20
48	Croatia	CRO	18
49	Belize	BIZ	18
50	Eritrea	ERI	18

Preceded by 2010	UCI Women's Road Rankings; 2011	Succeeded by 2012
