= 2011 UCI Road World Championships – Women's road race =

Women's road race
2011 UCI Road World Championships
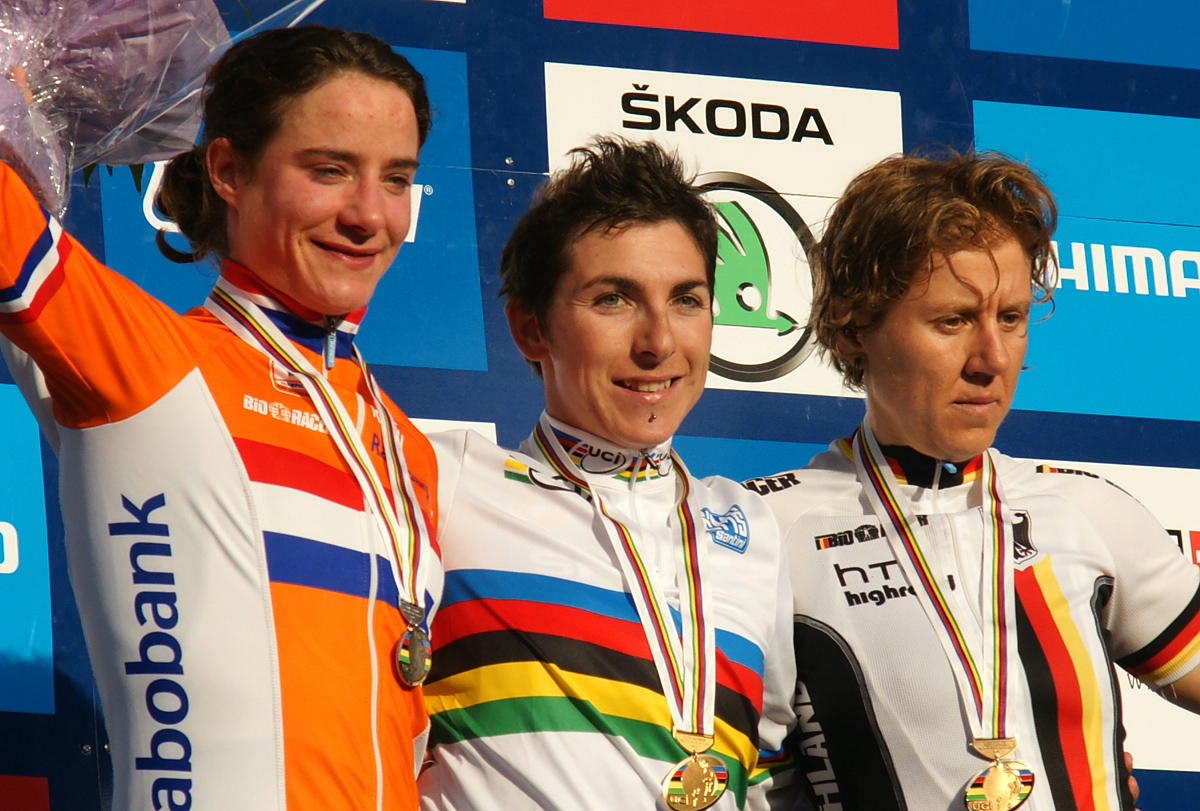
- The podium

Race details
- Dates: 24 September 2011
- Stages: 1 in (Denmark) Copenhagen (DEN)
- Distance: 140 km (87 mi)
- Winning time: 3h 21' 28"

Medalists
	Gold	(Italy) Giorgia Bronzini (ITA)
	Silver	(Netherlands) Marianne Vos (NED)
	Bronze	(Germany) Ina Teutenberg (GER)

The Women's road race of the 2011 UCI Road World Championships cycling event took place on 24 September in Copenhagen, Denmark. The course was 10 laps over a 14 km circuit making 140 km.

== Participating nations ==
No.	Code	Nation
1-8	ITA	Italy
9-15	NED	Netherlands
16-22	GER	Germany
23-29	SWE	Sweden
30-36	GBR	United Kingdom
37-42	RUS	Russia
43-48	USA	United States
49-54	BEL	Belgium
55-61	AUS	Australia
62-68	CAN	Canada
69-74	FRA	France
75-80	LTU	Lithuania
81-83	LUX	Luxembourg
84	NZL	New Zealand
85-88	UKR	Ukraine
89-92	ZAF	South Africa
93-94	EST	Estonia
95-98	SUI	Switzerland
99-100	BLR	Belarus
101-103	POL	Poland
104-106	THA	Thailand

No.	Cod.	Nation
107-109	NOR	Norway
110-112	TAI	Taiwan
113-115	VEN	Venezuela
116-118	AUT	Austria
119-121	SLO	Slovenia
122-124	DEN	Denmark
125-127	BRA	Brazil
128	JPN	Japan
129	CZE	Czech Republic
130	IRL	Ireland
131	FIN	Finland
132-134	ESP	Spain
135	MEX	Mexico
136-138	CRO	Croatia
139	HUN	Hungary
140	GUY	Guyana
141	SIN	Singapore
142	CHI	Chile
143	SKN	Saint Kitts and Nevis
144	ARG	Argentina

== Final classification ==
Of the race's 146 entrants, 120 riders completed the full distance.

Rank	Rider	Country	Time
1	Giorgia Bronzini	Italy	3h 21:28
2	Marianne Vos	Netherlands	+ 0"
3	Ina Teutenberg	Germany	+ 0"
4	Nicole Cooke	United Kingdom	+ 0"
5	Yuliya Martisova	Russia	+ 0"
6	Chloe Hosking	Australia	+ 0"
7	Elizabeth Armitstead	United Kingdom	+ 0"
8	Ludivine Henrion	Belgium	+ 0"
9	Rasa Leleivytė	Lithuania	+ 0"
10	Aude Biannic	France	+ 0"
11	Svetlana Bubnenkova	Russia	+ 0"
12	Joëlle Numainville	Canada	+ 0"
13	Lise Nøstvold	Norway	+ 0"
14	Emma Johansson	Sweden	+ 0"
15	Grace Verbeke	Belgium	+ 0"
16	Oxana Kozonchuk	Russia	+ 0"
17	Leah Kirchmann	Canada	+ 0"
18	Theresa Cliff-Ryan	United States	+ 0"
19	Paulina Brzeźna	Poland	+ 0"
20	Emilia Fahlin	Sweden	+ 0"
21	Liesbet De Vocht	Belgium	+ 0"
22	Shelley Olds	United States	+ 0"
23	Ashleigh Moolman	South Africa	+ 0"
24	Annemiek van Vleuten	Netherlands	+ 0"
25	Eneritz Iturriagaechevarria Mazaga	Spain	+ 0"
26	Sylwia Kapusta	Poland	+ 0"
27	Alena Amialiusik	Belarus	+ 0"
28	Vicki Whitelaw	Australia	+ 0"
29	Christel Ferrier-Bruneau	France	+ 0"
30	Grete Treier	Estonia	+ 0"
31	Olga Zabelinskaya	Russia	+ 0"
32	Joanna van de Winkel	South Africa	+ 0"
33	Erinne Willock	Canada	+ 0"
34	Cherise Taylor	South Africa	+ 0"
35	Pia Sundstedt	Finland	+ 0"
36	Rhae-Christie Shaw	Canada	+ 0"
37	Sofie De Vuyst	Belgium	+ 0"
38	Charlotte Becker	Germany	+ 0"
39	Monia Baccaille	Italy	+ 0"
40	Alessandra D'Ettorre	Italy	+ 0"
41	Polona Batagelj	Slovenia	+ 0"
42	Nathalie Lamborelle	Luxembourg	+ 0"
43	Eivgenia Vysotska	Ukraine	+ 0"
44	Mélodie Lesueur	France	+ 8"
45	Maaike Polspoel	Belgium	+ 8"
46	Paola Muñoz	Chile	+ 11"
47	Lucy Martin	United Kingdom	+ 11"
48	Flávia Oliveira	Brazil	+ 11"
49	Aleksandra Sošenko	Lithuania	+ 11"
50	Mayuko Hagiwara	Japan	+ 11"
51	Nontasin Chanpeng	Thailand	+ 11"
52	Rochelle Gilmore	Australia	+ 11"
53	Małgorzata Jasińska	Poland	+ 11"
54	Jennifer Hohl	Switzerland	+ 11"
55	Denise Ramsden	Canada	+ 11"
56	Sarah Düster	Germany	+ 11"
57	Elisa Longo Borghini	Italy	+ 17"
58	Kataržina Sosna	Lithuania	+ 17"
59	Judith Arndt	Germany	+ 17"
60	Lilibeth Chacón García	Venezuela	+ 17"
61	Patricia Schwager	Switzerland	+ 21"
62	Tetyana Ryabchenko	Ukraine	+ 21"
63	Noemi Cantele	Italy	+ 21"
64	Trixi Worrack	Germany	+ 27"
65	Katie Colclough	United Kingdom	+ 29"
66	Julie Leth	Denmark	+ 32"
67	Verónica Leal Balderas	Mexico	+ 39"
68	Angie González	Venezuela	+ 40"
69	Emma Pooley	United Kingdom	+ 40"
70	Martina Thomasson	Sweden	+ 41"
71	Emilie Aubry	Switzerland	+ 41"
72	Evelyn Stevens	United States	+ 41"
73	Amber Neben	United States	+ 41"
74	Martine Bras	Netherlands	+ 41"
75	Danielys García	Venezuela	+ 41"
76	Anna Sanchis Chafer	Spain	+ 41"
77	Inga Čilvinaitė	Lithuania	+ 41"
78	Pascale Schnider	Switzerland	+ 41"
79	Fabienne Schaus	Luxembourg	+ 41"
80	Alenka Novak	Slovenia	+ 41"
81	Sharon Laws	United Kingdom	+ 41"
82	Catherine Williamson	United Kingdom	+ 41"
83	Carla Ryan	Australia	+ 41"
84	Marie Lindberg	Sweden	+ 41"
85	Claudia Häusler	Germany	+ 41"
86	Madelene Olsson	Sweden	+ 41"
87	Audrey Cordon	France	+ 41"
88	Tara Whitten	Canada	+ 41"
89	Shara Gillow	Australia	+ 47"
90	Amanda Miller	United States	+ 47"
91	Lisa Brennauer	Germany	+ 47"
92	Alyona Andruk	Ukraine	+ 49"
93	Sara Mustonen	Sweden	+ 50"
94	Julie Krasniak	France	+ 57"
95	Loes Gunnewijk	Netherlands	+ 1' 04"
96	Tatiana Antoshina	Russia	+ 1' 08"
97	Valentina Scandolara	Italy	+ 1' 11"
98	Chantal Blaak	Netherlands	+ 1' 17"
99	Kirsten Wild	Netherlands	+ 1' 17"
100	Robyn de Groot	South Africa	+ 1' 19"
101	Robin Farina	United States	+ 1' 19"
102	Dorte Lohse Rasmussen	Denmark	+ 1' 24"
103	Clara Hughes	Canada	+ 1' 38"
104	Edita Janeliūnaitė	Lithuania	+ 2' 05"
105	Magdalena de Saint-Jean	France	+ 2' 05"
106	Alexandra Burchenkova	Russia	+ 2' 13"
107	Emilie Moberg	Norway	+ 2' 16"
108	Tatiana Guderzo	Italy	+ 2' 23"
109	Elena Cecchini	Italy	+ 2' 23"
110	Amanda Spratt	Australia	+ 2' 37"
111	Linda Melanie Villumsen	New Zealand	+ 2' 37"
112	Belén López	Spain	+ 2' 37"
113	Urtė Juodvalkytė	Lithuania	+ 2' 40"
114	Daniela Pintarelli	Austria	+ 3' 31"
115	Jessie MacLean	Australia	+ 4' 23"
116	Evelyn Arys	Belgium	+ 4' 23"
117	Jacqueline Hahn	Austria	+ 4' 23"
118	Tjaša Rutar	Slovenia	+ 7' 22"
119	Monrudee Chapookam	Thailand	+ 7' 43"
120	Thea Thorsen	Norway	+ 8' 52"
DNF	Lucinda Brand	Netherlands	
DNF	Michelle Lauge Jensen	Denmark	
DNF	Liisi Rist	Estonia	
DNF	Isabelle Söderberg	Sweden	
DNF	Mei Yu Hsiao	Chinese Taipei	
DNF	Siobhan Horgan	Ireland	
DNF	Olena Pavlukhina	Ukraine	
DNF	Ho Hsiung Huang	Chinese Taipei	
DNF	Alena Sitsko	Belarus	
DNF	Márcia Fernandes Silva	Brazil	
DNF	Kathryn Bertine	Saint Kitts and Nevis	
DNF	Chantal Hoffmann	Luxembourg	
DNF	Valeria Müller	Argentina	
DNF	Dinah Chan	Singapore	
DNF	Mia Radotić	Croatia	
DNF	Luciene Ferreira da Silva	Brazil	
DNF	Anita Rita Kenyo	Hungary	
DNF	Jutatip Maneephan	Thailand	
DNF	Hsiao Chia Tseng	Chinese Taipei	
DNF	Martina Růžičková	Czech Republic	
DNF	Andrea Graus	Austria	
DNF	Claire Fraser	Guyana	
DNF	Maja Marukic	Croatia	
DNF	Marina Bodulak	Croatia	
DNF	Seba Al-Raai	Syria	
DNF	Roba Helane	Syria	
