= 2011 in women's road cycling =

== UCI Road World Rankings ==
| Top-ranked individual | Second-ranked individual | Third-ranked individual | Top-ranked team | Top-ranked nation |
|---|---|---|---|---|
| Marianne Vos (NED); Nederland Bloeit | Emma Johansson (SWE); Hitec Products–UCK | Judith Arndt (GER); HTC–Highroad Women | Nederland Bloeit | Netherlands |

== World Championships ==
| Race | Date | Winner | Second | Third |
|---|---|---|---|---|
| World Championship Time Trial | September 20 | Judith Arndt (GER) | Linda Villumsen (NZL) | Emma Pooley (GBR) |
| World Championship Road Race | September 24 | Giorgia Bronzini (ITA) | Marianne Vos (NED) | Ina-Yoko Teutenberg (GER) |

== UCI World Cup ==
| | Race | Date | Winner | Second | Third |
|---|---|---|---|---|---|
| #1 | (Italy) Trofeo Alfredo Binda-Comune di Cittiglio | March 27 | Emma Pooley (GBR) | | |
| #2 | (Belgium) Tour of Flanders | April 3 | Annemiek van Vleuten (NED) | | |
| #3 | (Netherlands) Ronde van Drenthe | April 16 | Marianne Vos (NED) | | |
| #4 | (Belgium) La Flèche Wallonne Féminine | April 20 | Marianne Vos (NED) | | |
| #5 | (China) Tour of Chongming Island World Cup | May 15 | Ina-Yoko Teutenberg (GER) | | |
| #6 | (Spain) GP Ciudad de Valladolid | June 5 | Marianne Vos (NED) | | |
| #7 | (Sweden) Open de Suède Vårgårda TTT | July 29 | HTC–Highroad Women; Ellen van Dijk (NED); Charlotte Becker (GER); Amber Neben (USA); Judith Arndt (GER) | AA Drink–leontien.nl; Lucinda Brand (NED); Linda Villumsen (NZL); Kirsten Wild (NED); Trixi Worrack (GER) | Garmin–Cervélo; Elizabeth Armitstead (GBR); Noemi Cantele (NZL); Sharon Laws (GBR); Emma Pooley (GBR); Iris Slappendel (NED) |
| #8 | (Sweden) Open de Suède Vårgårda | July 31 | Annemiek van Vleuten (NED) | Ellen van Dijk (NED) | Nicole Cooke (GBR) |
| #9 | (France) GP de Plouay – Bretagne | August 27 | Annemiek van Vleuten (NED) | | |

== Single day races (1.1 and 1.2) ==
| Race | Date | Cat. | Winner |
|---|---|---|---|
| (Netherlands) Drentse 8 | April 14 | 1.1 | Marianne Vos (NED) |
| (Belgium) GP Stad Roeselare | April 24 | 1.1 | Amber Neben (USA) |
| (Luxembourg) Grand Prix Elsy Jacobs | April 30 | 1.1 | Marianne Vos (NED) |
| (Luxembourg) Grand-Prix Nicolas Frantz | May 1 | 1.1 | Marianne Vos (NED) |
| (Canada) Chrono Gatineau | May 19 | 1.1 | Clara Hughes (CAN) |
| (Canada) Grand Prix Cycliste de Gatineau | May 21 | 1.1 | Giorgia Bronzini (ITA) |
| (United States) Liberty Classic | June 5 | 1.1 | Giorgia Bronzini (ITA) |
| (Germany) Sparkassen Giro | July 31 | 1.1 | Adrie Visser (NED) |
| (France) Chrono Champenois | September 11 | 1.1 | Judith Arndt (GER) |
| (France) Chrono des Nations | October 16 | 1.1 | Amber Neben (USA) |
| (Belgium) Omloop Het Nieuwsblad | February 26 | 1.2 | Emma Johansson (SWE) |
| (Belgium) Omloop van het Hageland – Tielt-Winge | March 6 | 1.2 | Emma Johansson (SWE) |
| (France) Cholet Pays de Loire Dames | March 20 | 1.2 | Emma Johansson (SWE) |
| (Italy) GP Costa Etrusca III | March 20 | 1.2 | Shelley Olds (USA) |
| (Belgium) Grand Prix de Dottignies | April 4 | 1.2 | Emma Johansson (SWE) |
| (Belgium) Halle-Buizingen | April 17 | 1.2 | Martine Bras (NED) |
| (Netherlands) Ronde van Gelderland | April 17 | 1.2 | Ina-Yoko Teutenberg (GER) |
| (Netherlands) EPZ Omloop van Borsele | April 23 | 1.2 | Kirsten Wild (NED) |
| (Italy) GP Liberazione | April 25 | 1.2 | Giorgia Bronzini (ITA) |
| (Belgium) Bredene | May 7 | 1.2 | Winanda Spoor (NED) |
| (Venezuela) Clasico Aniversario De La Federacion Veneolana De Ciclismo | May 14 | 1.2 | Angie González (VEN) |
| (Venezuela) Copa Federacion venezolana de ciclismo corre por la vida | May 15 | 1.2 | Angie González (VEN) |
| (Italy) GP Comune di Cornaredo | May 22 | 1.2 | Rasa Leleivytė (LTU) |
| (Netherlands) 5e Verti advies 7 Dorpenomloop Aalburg | May 28 | 1.2 | Marianne Vos (NED) |
| (Belgium) Gooik | June 2 | 1.2 | Marianne Vos (NED) |
| (Netherlands) Therme kasseienomloop | June 5 | 1.2 | Christine Majerus (LUX) |
| (Spain) Emakumeen Saria | June 7 | 1.2 | Marianne Vos (NED) |
| (Italy) GP Cento Carnevale d'Europa | July 16 | 1.2 | Monia Baccaille (ITA) |
| (Belgium) Dwars door de Westhoek | July 17 | 1.2 | Grace Verbeke (BEL) |
| (Belgium) Erpe-Mere (Erondegem) | August 6 | 1.2 | Chantal Blaak (NED) |
| (Italy) Memorial Davide Fardelli – Cronometro Individuale | September 4 | 1.2 | Judith Arndt (GER) |
| (Belgium) Finale Lotto Cycling Cup – Breendonk | September 17 | 1.2 | Grace Verbeke (BEL) |
| (Syria) Golan I | October 1 | 1.2 | Ivanna Borovychenko (UKR) |
| (Syria) Golan II | October 3 | 1.2 | Ivanna Borovychenko (UKR) |

== Stage races (2.1 and 2.2) ==
| Race | Date | Cat. | Winner |
|---|---|---|---|
| Ladies Tour of Qatar | February 2–4 | 2.1 | Ellen van Dijk (NED) |
| (China) Tour of Chongming Island | May 11–13 | 2.1 | Ina-Yoko Teutenberg (GER) |
| (Spain) Iurreta-Emakumeen Bira | June 9–12 | 2.1 | Marianne Vos (NED) |
| (Italy) Giro del Trentino Alto Adige-Südtirol | June 17–19 | 2.1 | Judith Arndt (GER) |
| (Italy) Giro d'Italia Femminile | July 1, 2001–10 | 2.1 | Marianne Vos (NED) |
| (Germany) Internationale Thüringen Rundfahrt der Frauen | July 18–24 | 2.1 | Emma Johansson (SWE) |
| (Netherlands) Profile Ladies Tour | September 6–11 | 2.1 | Marianne Vos (NED) |
| (Italy) Giro Toscana Int. Femminile – Memorial Michela Fanini | September 13–18 | 2.1 | Megan Guarnier (USA) |
| Women's Tour of New Zealand | February 23–26 | 2.2 | Judith Arndt (GER) |
| (Netherlands) Energiewacht Tour | April 7- | 2.2 | Adrie Visser (NED) |
| (Czech Republic) Gracia–Orlová | April 27 – May 1 | 2.2 | Tatiana Antoshina (RUS) |
| (Poland) Puchar Prezesa LZS | June 11–12 | 2.2 | Vilija Sereikaitė (LTU) |
| (Netherlands) Rabo Ster Zeeuwsche Eilanden | June 16–18 | 2.2 | Marianne Vos (NED) |
| (Czech Republic) Tour de Feminin – O cenu Českého Švýcarska | July 7–10 | 2.2 | Amanda Spratt (AUS) |
| (France) Tour de Bretagne Féminin | July 14–17 | 2.2 | Alexandra Burchenkova (RUS) |
| (France) Tour Féminin en Limousin | July 21–24 | 2.2 | Grete Treier (EST) |
| (France) Trophée d'Or Féminin | August 20–24 | 2.2 | Tatiana Antoshina (RUS) |
| (France) Tour Cycliste Féminin International de l'Ardèche | September 5–10 | 2.2 | Emma Pooley (GBR) |

== See also ==
- 2011 in men's road cycling
