= 2011 Tour of Chongming Island Stage race =

Race details
- Dates: 11–13 May 2011
- Stages: 3
- Winning time: 6h 44' 24"

Results
Jersey awarded to the overall winner	Winner	Ina-Yoko Teutenberg (GER)	(HTC–Highroad Women)
	Second	Annemiek van Vleuten (NED)	(Nederland Bloeit)
	Third	Monia Baccaille (ITA)	(SC MCipollini–Giordana)
Jersey awarded to the points classification winner	Points	Ina-Yoko Teutenberg (GER)	(HTC–Highroad Women)
	Team	HTC–Highroad Women	

The 2011 Tour of Chongming Island Stage race was the fifth women's edition of the Tour of Chongming Island cycling stage race. It was rated by the UCI as category 2.1, and was held between 11 and 13 May 2011, in China.

== Stages ==
=== Stage 1 ===
11 May 2011 – Chongbei to Chongbei, 73.4 km (45.6 mi)

Stage 1 result

	Rider	Team	Time
1	Lizzie Armitstead (GBR)	Garmin–Cervelo	1h 49' 22"
2	Ina-Yoko Teutenberg (GER)	HTC–Highroad Women	s.t.
3	Annemiek van Vleuten (NED)	Nederland Bloeit	s.t.
4	Monia Baccaille (ITA)	SC MCipollini–Giordana	s.t.
5	Emma Johansson (SWE)	Hitec Products–UCK	s.t.

General Classification after Stage 1

	Rider	Team	Time
1	Lizzie Armitstead (GBR)	Garmin–Cervélo	1h 49' 10"
2	Ina-Yoko Teutenberg (GER)	HTC–Highroad Women	+1"
3	Annemiek van Vleuten (NED)	Nederland Bloeit	+8"
4	Monia Baccaille (ITA)	SC MCipollini–Giordana	+10"
5	Emma Johansson (SWE)	Hitec Products–UCK	+11"

=== Stage 2 ===
4 June 2011 – Chongxi to Chongxi, 118.4 km (73.6 mi)

Stage 2 result

	Rider	Team	Time
1	Ina-Yoko Teutenberg (GER)	HTC–Highroad Women	3h 01' 02"
2	Annemiek van Vleuten (NED)	Nederland Bloeit	s.t.
3	Charlotte Becker (GER)	HTC–Highroad Women	s.t.
4	Emma Johansson (SWE)	Hitec Products–UCK	s.t.
5	Monia Baccaille (ITA)	SC MCipollini–Giordana	s.t.

General Classification after Stage 2

	Rider	Team	Time
1	Ina-Yoko Teutenberg (GER)	HTC–Highroad Women	4h 49' 57"
2	Annemiek van Vleuten (NED)	Nederland Bloeit	+17"
3	Emma Johansson (SWE)	Hitec Products–UCK	+20"
4	Lauren Tamayo (USA)	United States national team	+26"
5	Monia Baccaille (ITA)	SC MCipollini–Giordana	+27"

=== Stage 3 ===
5 June 2011 – Shanghai to Shanghai, 79.2 km (49.2 mi)

Stage 3 result

	Rider	Team	Time
1	Chloe Hosking (AUS)	HTC–Highroad Women	1h 54' 36"
2	Ina-Yoko Teutenberg (GER)	HTC–Highroad Women	s.t.
3	Monia Baccaille (ITA)	SC MCipollini–Giordana	s.t.
4	Ellen van Dijk (NED)	HTC–Highroad Women	s.t.
5	Lizzie Armitstead (GBR)	Garmin–Cervelo	s.t.

General Classification after Stage 3

	Rider	Team	Time
1	Ina-Yoko Teutenberg (GER)	HTC–Highroad Women	6h 44' 24"
2	Annemiek van Vleuten (NED)	Nederland Bloeit	+ 26"
3	Monia Baccaille (ITA)	SC MCipollini–Giordana	+ 27"
4	Emma Johansson (SWE)	Hitec Products–UCK	+ 27"
5	Sara Mustonen (SWE)	Hitec Products–UCK	+ 33"

== Final classifications ==
=== General classification ===
	Rider	Team	Time
1	Ina-Yoko Teutenberg (GER)	HTC–Highroad Women	6h 44' 24"
2	Annemiek van Vleuten (NED)	Nederland Bloeit	+ 26"
3	Monia Baccaille (ITA)	SC MCipollini–Giordana	+ 27"
4	Emma Johansson (SWE)	Hitec Products–UCK	+ 27"
5	Sara Mustonen (SWE)	Hitec Products–UCK	+ 33"
6	Giada Borgato (ITA)		+ 34"
7	Lauren Tamayo (USA)	United States national team	+ 34"
8	Romy Kasper (GER)	Germany national team	+ 36"
9	Sarah Düster (GER)	Vrienden van het Platteland	+ 36"
10	Lucy Martin (GBR)	Garmin–Cervélo	+ 36"

=== Points Classification ===
	Rider	Team	Points
1	Ina-Yoko Teutenberg (GER)	HTC–Highroad Women	61
2	Monia Baccaille (ITA)	SC MCipollini–Giordana	32
3	Emma Johansson (SWE)	Hitec Products–UCK	27
4	Annemiek van Vleuten (NED)	Nederland Bloeit	23
5	Lizzie Armitstead (GBR)	Garmin–Cervélo	22
6	Chloe Hosking (AUS)	HTC–Highroad Women	14
7	Charlotte Becker (GER)	HTC–Highroad Women	10
8	Giorgia Bronzini (ITA)	Italy national team	10
9	Rochelle Gilmore (AUS)	Lotto Honda Team	9
10	Ellen van Dijk (NED)	HTC–Highroad Women	8

=== Team Classification ===
	Team	Time
1	HTC–Highroad Women	20h 15' 15"
2	Nederland Bloeit	+ 1' 25"
3	Hitec Products–UCK	+ 1' 25"
4	Italy national team	+ 2' 51"
5	Germany national team	+ 3' 05"

== See also ==
- 2011 in women's road cycling
