= 2011 Skil Koga season =

2011 Skil Koga

Season victories
- One-day races: Road cycling: 0 Track cycling: 1
- Stage race overall: 0
- Stage race stages: 0
- Best ranked rider: Amy Pieters (72)

The 2011 women's road cycling season was the first season for Skil Koga.

== Roster ==
- Christina Becker (GER)
- Regina Bruins (NED)
- Suzanne de Goede (NED)
- Anne de Wildt (NED) (From 23/6)
- Roxane Knetemann (NED) (Until 6/6)
- Kelly Markus (NED) (From 1/8 as trainee)
- Amy Pieters (NED)
- Alison Testroete (CAN)
- Esra Tromp (NED)
- Linda van Rijen (NED) (From 12/6)
- Hannah Welter (NED)

== Season victories ==
Track cycling
Date	Nation	Race	Cat.	Winner
4 November	Kazakhstan	2011–12 UCI Track Cycling World Cup – Round 1, team pursuit (Note: As part of the national team)	CDM	Amy Pieters (NED) (with Ellen van Dijk (NED) and Kirsten Wild (NED))
