= Grand Prix Elsy Jacobs =

Luxembourgish multi-day road cycling race

Festival Luxembourgeois du cyclisme féminin Elsy Jacobs
Race details
- Date: April / May
- Region: Luxembourg
- Local name(s): Grand Prix Elsy Jacobs
- Discipline: Road
- Type: Single day race (2008–2011); Stage race (2012–present)
- Organiser: Cycling club SaF Zéisséng
- Web site: www.elsy-jacobs.lu

History
- First edition: 2008
- Editions: 17 (as of 2025)
- First winner: Monia Baccaille (ITA)
- Most wins: Marianne Vos (NED) (3 wins)
- Most recent: Marta Lach (POL)

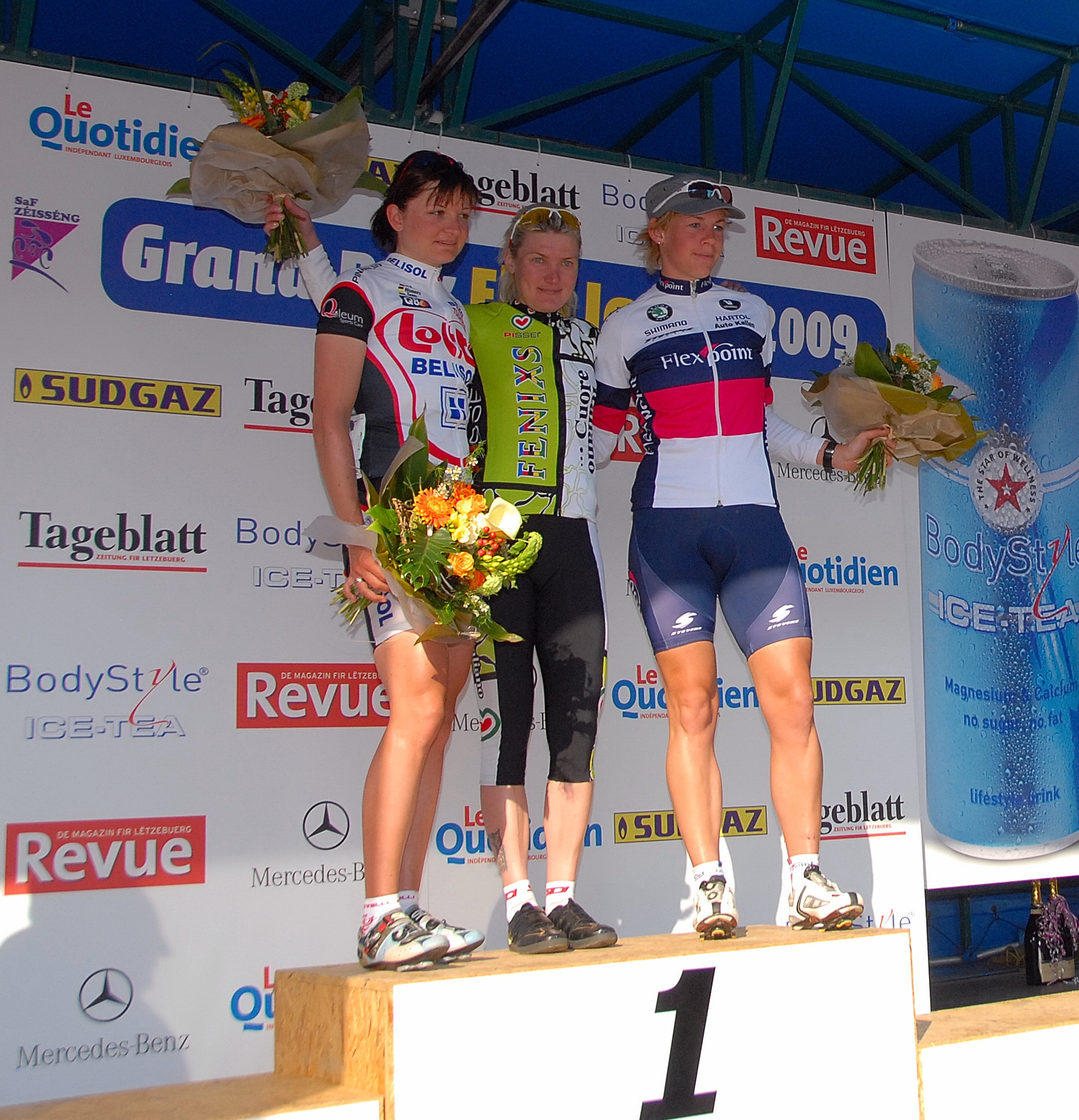
GP Elsy Jacobs 2009 podium

The Festival Luxembourgeois du cyclisme féminin Elsy Jacobs formerly known as the Grand Prix Elsy Jacobs is an international women's road bicycle race held in Garnich, Luxembourg.

The race was first held in 2008 as a one-day race. Between 2009 and 2011 it was rated as an UCI 1.1 category race. Since 2012, it has been run as a stage race. Between 2021 and 2023, the race was part of the UCI Women's ProSeries, the second tier women's elite road cycling tour.

The race is named after Luxembourgish cyclist Elsy Jacobs, the first winner of the women's road race at the UCI Road World Championships, which took place at Reims, France in 1958. Jacobs was also the hour record holder from 1958 to 1972, as well as fifteen-time Luxembourgish national champion.

== Winners ==
Year	First	Second	Third
2008	Monia Baccaille (ITA)	Nathalie Lamborelle (LUX)	Marina Romoli (ITA)
2009	Svetlana Bubnenkova (RUS)	Grace Verbeke (BEL)	Iris Slappendel (NED)
2010	Emma Pooley (GBR)	Monia Baccaille (ITA)	Andrea Bosman (NED)
2011	Marianne Vos (NED)	Judith Arndt (GER)	Emma Johansson (SWE)
2012	Marianne Vos (NED)	Annemiek van Vleuten (NED)	Adrie Visser (NED)
2013	Marianne Vos (NED)	Giorgia Bronzini (ITA)	Emma Johansson (SWE)
2014	Anna van der Breggen (NED)	Marianne Vos (NED)	Shelley Olds (USA)
2015	Anna van der Breggen (NED)	Annemiek van Vleuten (NED)	Lucinda Brand (NED)
2016	Katarzyna Niewiadoma (POL)	Katrin Garfoot (AUS)	Anna van der Breggen (NED)
2017	Christine Majerus (LUX)	Eugenia Bujak (POL)	Ashleigh Moolman (RSA)
2018	Letizia Paternoster (ITA)	Christine Majerus (LUX)	Lotta Lepistö (FIN)
2019	Lisa Brennauer (GER)	Demi Vollering (NED)	Lizzy Banks (GBR)
2020	No race due to the COVID-19 pandemic		
2021	Emma Norsgaard Jørgensen (DEN)	Leah Kirchmann (CAN)	Maria Giulia Confalonieri (ITA)
2022	Marta Bastianelli (ITA)	Veronica Ewers (USA)	Silvia Persico (ITA)
2023	Ally Wollaston (NZL)	Marta Bastianelli (ITA)	Anouska Koster (NED)
2024	Marta Lach (POL)	Scarlett Souren (NED)	Anouska Koster (NED)
2025	Marta Lach (POL)	Maria Giulia Confalonieri (ITA)	Sarah Van Dam (CAN)
