= 2011 Ladies Tour of Qatar =

- Route of the 2011 Ladies Tour of Qatar

Race details
- Dates: 2–4 February 2011
- Stages: 3
- Distance: 291.4 km (181.1 mi)
- Winning time: 7h 51' 04"

Results
Jersey awarded to the overall winner	Winner	Ellen van Dijk (the Netherlands)	(HTC–Highroad Women)
	Second	Charlotte Becker (Germany)	(HTC–Highroad Women)
	Third	Iris Slappendel (the Netherlands)	(Garmin–Cervélo)
	Points	Ellen van Dijk (the Netherlands)	(HTC–Highroad Women)
Jersey awarded to the young rider classification winner	Young rider	Ellen van Dijk (the Netherlands)	(HTC–Highroad Women)
	Team	HTC–Highroad Women	

Stage 1 Stage 2 Stage 3

The 2011 Ladies Tour of Qatar (2–4 February 2011, Qatar) was the third running of the Ladies Tour of Qatar cycling stage race. The Union Cycliste Internationale (UCI) rated it as 'category 2.1'.

== Teams ==
The peloton numbered eighty-nine riders from fifteen teams. There were nine UCI teams and six national teams. Fourteen teams had six riders. One team had five riders. The teams that participated in the tour were:

UCI teams	National teams
Gauss	United States of America
Giant Pro Cycling	Australia
Lotto-Honda	Germany
SC Mcipollini Giordana	Italy
Skil-Koga Cycling Team	France
Nederland Bloeit	Netherlands
Vaiano Solaristech	
Specialized–Lululemon	
Garmin–Cervélo	

== Stages ==
=== Stage 1 ===
2 February 2011 – Camelodrome to Dukhan, 104.5 km (64.9 mi)

The first stage began in fine weather at 12.30 pm. Rochelle Gilmore (Australia) of Lotto Honda won the stage, the points standings and the gold jersey with a 5-second advantage over Giorgia Bronzini (Italy). Veronica Andréasson (Sweden) made a break at 54 km after the second intermediate sprint and held the lead for 3 km. 25 km from the finish, Valentina Bastianelli made an unsuccessful break. 5 km from the finish, the peloton remained bunched. On reaching a slight uphill portion near Dukhan, a group of twelve riders broke away to reach the finish 15 seconds before the main group. Hosking won the 'best young rider' class for the stage.

Stage 1 result

	Rider	Team	Time
1	Rochelle Gilmore (AUS)	Lotto–Honda Team	2h 19' 07"
2	Giorgia Bronzini (ITA)	Italy	s.t.
3	Chloe Hosking (AUS)	HTC–Highroad Women	s.t.
4	Ellen van Dijk (NED)	HTC–Highroad Women	s.t.
5	Lucy Martin (GBR)	Garmin–Cervélo	s.t.
6	Martine Bras (NED)	Netherlands	s.t.
7	Rossella Callovi (ITA)	SC Mcipollini Giordana	s.t.
8	Charlotte Becker (GER)	HTC–Highroad Women	s.t.
9	Suzanne de Goede (NED)	Skil-Koga Cycling Team	s.t.
10	Noemi Cantele (ITA)	Garmin–Cervélo	s.t.

General Classification after Stage 1

	Rider	Team	Time
1	Rochelle Gilmore (AUS)	Lotto–Honda Team	2h 18' 53"
2	Giorgia Bronzini (ITA)	Italy	+5"
3	Chloe Hosking (AUS)	HTC–Highroad Women	+10"
4	Ellen van Dijk (NED)	HTC–Highroad Women	+13"
5	Lucy Martin (GBR)	Garmin–Cervélo	+13"
6	Martine Bras (NED)	Netherlands	+14"
7	Rossella Callovi (ITA)	SC Mcipollini Giordana	+14"
8	Charlotte Becker (GER)	HTC–Highroad Women	+14"
9	Suzanne de Goede (NED)	Skil-Koga Cycling Team	+14"
10	Noemi Cantele (ITA)	Garmin–Cervélo	+14"

=== Stage 2 ===
3 February 2011 – Doha to Lusail, 94.9 km (59.0 mi)

The second stage was held in windy conditions. There was a headwind for the first 40 km. After one hour, the riders had covered only 26.6 km. HTC Highroad raced best with three riders in the decisive breakaway. At 15 km, Bastianelli broke away and took a lead of 1 sec/km at 18.5 km. She was caught by the peloton at 25 km. At 36 km, following a crash, a group of eight riders broke away from the main group. The breakaway group included four HTC Highroad riders (Ellen van Dijk, Charlotte Becker, Chloe Hosking (in the white jersey) and Adrie Visser); three Garmin–Cervélo riders (Alex Rhodes, Trine Schmidt, Iris Slappendel and Loes Gunnewijk (Holland)). The first intermediate sprint at 41.5 km was won by Van Dijk who was 45 seconds ahead of the main group. Hosking dropped from the leading group due to a mechanical problem. At 57.5 km, Van Dijk won the second bonus sprint by one minute and five seconds. In the first passage about the final circuit in Lusail, seven riders had a lead of one minute and fifty-five seconds. With one lap left, the gap increased to two minutes and fifty-five seconds. 5 km from the finish, Schmidt and Visser broke away but were caught at 2 km from the finish. Van Dijk won the final sprint ahead of Rhodes and Visser and took the gold jersey with a fifteen-second advantage over Becker and a twenty-one second advantage over Slappendel. Van Dijk also led the points and 'best young rider' standings.

Stage 2 result

	Rider	Team	Time
1	Ellen van Dijk (NED)	HTC–Highroad Women	2h 19' 07"
2	Alex Rhodes (AUS)	Garmin–Cervélo	s.t.
3	Adrie Visser (NED)	HTC–Highroad Women	s.t.
4	Charlotte Becker (GER)	HTC–Highroad Women	s.t.
5	Loes Gunnewijk (NED)	Nederland Bloeit	s.t.
6	Iris Slappendel (NED)	Garmin–Cervélo	s.t.
7	Trine Schmidt (DEN)	Garmin–Cervélo	s.t.
8	Alison Starnes (USA)	United States of America	+1' 84"
9	Noemi Cantele (ITA)	Garmin–Cervélo	+2' 02"
10	Valentina Scandolara (ITA)	Gauss	+2' 02"

General Classification after Stage 2

	Rider	Team	Time
1	Ellen van Dijk (NED)	HTC–Highroad Women	5h 25' 42"
2	Charlotte Becker (GER)	HTC–Highroad Women	+15"
3	Iris Slappendel (NED)	Garmin–Cervélo	+21"
4	Adrie Visser (NED)	HTC–Highroad Women	+24"
5	Alex Rhodes (AUS)	Garmin–Cervélo	+ 26"
6	Loes Gunnewijk (NED)	Nederland Bloeit	+32"
7	Trine Schmidt (DEN)	Garmin–Cervélo	+32"
8	Rochelle Gilmore (AUS)	Lotto–Honda Team	+2' 04"
9	Giorgia Bronzini (ITA)	Italy	+2' 09"
10	Chloe Hosking (AUS)	HTC–Highroad Women	+2' 14"

=== Stage 3 ===
4 February 2011 – Al Daayen to Doha, 92 km (57.2 mi)

The third stage began at the Al Dayeen resort with 87 riders. Megan Guarnier (USA) made a number of attempts to break away before achieving a lead at 28 km. At the final circuit, she held a 10-second advantage which increased to 22 seconds. At 47.5 km, she was caught by the peloton. At 65.5 km, with six laps to go, ten riders broke away from the main group. They included Nicole Cooke, an Olympian and Valentina Scandolara (Italy). The leading ten riders had a twenty-three second advantage over the pack at the second bonus sprint which was won by Scandolara. With four laps to go, the front group had made a gap of 32 seconds. As the pack moved closer, Cooke and De Goede broke away in the final 5 kilometers but their effort failed when the peloton caught them at 2 km from the finish. The final sprint was won by Monia Bacaille (Italy). Giorgia Bronzini (Italy) came second. In the standings, van Dijk who was fourth in stage three, won the race. She had a 15-second lead over Becker and 20 seconds over Slapendel. Van Dijk also won on points and also the 'best young rider' class. HTC Highroad won 'best team'.

Stage 3 result

	Rider	Team	Time
1	Monia Baccaille (ITA)	SC Mcipollini Giordana	2h 25' 22"
2	Giorgia Bronzini (ITA)	Italy	s.t.
3	Rochelle Gilmore (AUS)	Lotto–Honda Team	s.t.
4	Ellen van Dijk (NED)	HTC–Highroad Women	s.t.
5	Aurore Verhoeven (FRA)	Gauss	s.t.
6	Sarah Düster (GER)	Nederland Bloeit	s.t.
7	Elke Gebhardt (GER)	Germany	s.t.
8	Pascale Jeuland (FRA)	France	s.t.
9	Noemi Cantele (LTU)	Vaiano Solaristech	s.t.
10	Marta Tagliaferro (ITA)	SC Mcipollini Giordana	s.t.

General Classification after Stage 3

	Rider	Team	Time
1	Ellen van Dijk (NED)	HTC–Highroad Women	7h 51' 04"
2	Charlotte Becker (GER)	HTC–Highroad Women	+ 15"
3	Iris Slappendel (NED)	Garmin–Cervélo	+ 20"
4	Adrie Visser (NED)	HTC–Highroad Women	+ 24"
5	Alex Rhodes (AUS)	Garmin–Cervélo	+ 26"
6	Loes Gunnewijk (NED)	Nederland Bloeit	+ 32"
7	Trine Schmidt (DEN)	Garmin–Cervélo	+ 32"
8	Rochelle Gilmore (AUS)	Lotto–Honda Team	+ 2' 00"
9	Giorgia Bronzini (ITA)	Italy	+ 2' 03"
10	Chloe Hosking (AUS)	HTC–Highroad Women	+ 2' 14"

== Leaders classes ==
Three jerseys were awarded. The leader of the general class received a golden jersey and first place in the race. The result was calculated by adding the cyclist's finishing time, after each stage, to time bonuses won. The cyclist with the highest number of points received a silver jersey. Points were scored for finishing in the top three in the intermediate sprint and for finishing in the top twenty in a stage. At the intermediate sprint, first received 3 points, second, 2 points and third, one point. The stage winner received 30 points; second, 27 points; third, 25 points; fourth, 23 points; fifth, 21 points; sixth, 19 points; seventh, 17 points; eight, 15 points; ninth, 13 points; tenth, 11 points; and one point for eleventh to twentieth place. The best youth (a cyclist born after 1 January 1987) received a blue jersey. The winner was determined in the same way as the general class.

Stage	Winner	General Classification	Points Classification	Young Rider Classification
1	Rochelle Gilmore	Rochelle Gilmore	Rochelle Gilmore	Chloe Hosking
2	Monia Baccaille	Ellen van Dijk	Ellen van Dijk	Ellen van Dijk
3	Ellen van Dijk	Ellen van Dijk	Ellen van Dijk	Ellen van Dijk
Final		Ellen van Dijk	Ellen van Dijk	Ellen van Dijk

== Final classifications ==
=== General classification ===
	Rider	Team	Time
1	Ellen van Dijk (NED)	HTC–Highroad Women	7h 51' 04"
2	Charlotte Becker (GER)	HTC–Highroad Women	+ 15"
3	Iris Slappendel (NED)	Garmin–Cervélo	+ 20"
4	Adrie Visser (NED)	HTC–Highroad Women	+ 24"
5	Alex Rhodes (AUS)	Garmin–Cervélo	+ 26"
6	Loes Gunnewijk (NED)	Nederland Bloeit	+ 32"
7	Trine Schmidt (DEN)	Garmin–Cervélo	+ 32"
8	Rochelle Gilmore (AUS)	Lotto–Honda Team	+ 2' 00"
9	Giorgia Bronzini (ITA)	Italy	+ 2' 03"
10	Chloe Hosking (AUS)	HTC–Highroad Women	+ 2' 14"

=== Points Classification ===
	Rider	Team	Time
1	Ellen van Dijk (NED)	HTC–Highroad Women	35 points
2	Rochelle Gilmore (AUS)	Lotto–Honda Team	28 points
3	Giorgia Bronzini (ITA)	Italy	27 points'
4	Monia Baccaille (ITA)	Lotto–Honda Team	15 points
5	Adrie Visser (NED)	SC Mcipollini Giordana	13 points

=== Youth Classification ===
	Rider	Team	Time
1	Ellen van Dijk (NED)	HTC–Highroad Women	7h 51' 04"
2	Trine Schmidt (DEN)	Garmin–Cervélo	+ 32"
3	Chloe Hosking (AUS)	Garmin–Cervélo	+ 2' 14"
4	Lauren Kitchen (AUS)	Garmin–Cervélo	+ 2' 29"
5	Roxane Knetemann (NED)		+ 2' 32"

=== Team Classification ===
	Team	Riders
1	HTC–Highroad Women	Ellen van Dijk (NED) Chloe Hosking (AUS); Charlotte Becker (GER); Adrie Visser (NED); Emilia Fahlin (SWE); Evelyn Stevens (USA)

== See also ==
- 2011 in women's road cycling
- 2011 in Qatar
