= Carla Swart =

South African cyclist (1987–2011)

Personal information
- Full name: Carla Swart
- Born: 26 November 1987 South Africa
- Died: 19 January 2011 (aged 23) South Africa

Cycling career
- Sport: Cycling
- Discipline: Road
- Role: Rider

Professional teams
- 2009–2010: MTN Energade Ladies Team
- 2011: HTC–Highroad Women

Carla Swart (26 November 1987 – 19 January 2011) was a South African cyclist who won nineteen individual and team cycling titles. She was a professional cyclist, riding for HTC–Highroad Women in 2011.

Swart moved to the United States in 2004 as a teenager. She attended Lees-McRae College, where she was awarded scholarships in running and cycling.

== Career ==
Carla Swart became the first cyclist to win all four U.S. collegiate titles in one season (2008). She placed 10th in the women's road race in the 2010 UCI Road World Championships, and had placed eighth at the Commonwealth Games in October of that year. She signed with the HTC-Highroad cycling team shortly before her death. Her career spanned 21 national titles in four different biking disciplines: cyclo-cross, mountain bike, road, and track.

== Death ==
Swart died whilst training in South Africa after being hit by a truck. It was claimed that she had looked over her left shoulder, as if she were in the United States, instead of her right, as would normally be the case in South Africa where vehicles drive on the left-hand side of the road. HTC–Highroad Women teammate Ellen van Dijk dedicated her stage win and general classification victory at the 2011 Ladies Tour of Qatar to Swart. The prize money Van Dijk earned in Qatar was sent to her family. Lees-McRae College has a scholarship named in her honor.

== Major results ==
2009
1st Stage 4 Tour of the Gila
8th Overall Tour de PEI
2010
National Road Championships

3rd Time trial
4th Road Race

8th Ronde van Drenthe
8th Liberty Classic
8th Commonwealth Games Road race
10th Overall Trophée d'Or Féminin
10th World Championship Road race

== See also ==
- 2011 HTC-Highroad Women season
- List of racing cyclists and pacemakers with a cycling-related death
