= Huang Ho-hsiung =

Taiwanese cyclist

Personal information
- Born: Taiwan

Cycling career
- Sport: Cycling
- Discipline: Road cycling

Huang Ho-hsiung is a road cyclist from Taiwan. She represented her nation as Chinese Taipei at the 2011 UCI Road World Championships.

== Major results ==
2014
Taiwan Hsin-Chu Track International Classic

3rd Individual Pursuit
3rd Omnium
