= 2011 Open de Suède Vårgårda TTT =

2011 Open de Suède Vårgårda Team time trial
2011 UCI Women's Road World Cup, race 7 of 9

Race details
- Dates: 29 July 2011
- Stages: 1
- Distance: 43 km (26.72 mi)
- Winning time: 53' 02"

Results
	Winner	HTC–Highroad Women
	Second	AA Drink–leontien.nl
	Third	Garmin–Cervélo

The 2011 Open de Suède Vårgårda – team time trial was the 4th team time trial running on the Open de Suède Vårgårda. It was held on 29 July 2011 over a distance of 43 kilometres (26.7 miles) and was the seventh race of the 2011 UCI Women's Road World Cup season.

== General standings (top 10) ==
	Team	Cyclists	Time	World Cup points
1	HTC–Highroad Women	Ellen van Dijk (NED)	53' 02"	35
1	HTC–Highroad Women	Charlotte Becker (GER)	53' 02"	35
1	HTC–Highroad Women	Amber Neben (USA)	53' 02"	35
1	HTC–Highroad Women	Judith Arndt (GER)	53' 02"	35
2	AA Drink–leontien.nl	Lucinda Brand (NED)	+ 1' 44"	30
2	AA Drink–leontien.nl	Linda Villumsen (NZL)	+ 1' 44"	30
2	AA Drink–leontien.nl	Kirsten Wild (NED)	+ 1' 44"	30
2	AA Drink–leontien.nl	Trixi Worrack (GER)	+ 1' 44"	30
3	Garmin–Cervélo	Elizabeth Armitstead (GBR)	+ 1' 50"	25
3	Garmin–Cervélo	Noemi Cantele (NZL)	+ 1' 50"	25
3	Garmin–Cervélo	Sharon Laws (GBR)	+ 1' 50"	25
3	Garmin–Cervélo	Emma Pooley (GBR)	+ 1' 50"	25
3	Garmin–Cervélo	Iris Slappendel (NED)	+ 1' 50"	25
4	Australia	Elizabeth Armistead (AUS)	+ 1' 51"	20
4	Australia	Taryn Heather (AUS)	+ 1' 51"	20
4	Australia	Lauren Kitchen (AUS)	+ 1' 51"	20
4	Australia	Jessie MacLean (AUS)	+ 1' 51"	20
4	Australia	Amanda Spratt (AUS)	+ 1' 51"	20
5	Nederland Bloeit	Loes Gunnewijk (NED)	+ 2' 02"	16
5	Nederland Bloeit	Patricia Schwager (NED)	+ 2' 02"	16
5	Nederland Bloeit	Annemiek Van Vleuten (NED)	+ 2' 02"	16
5	Nederland Bloeit	Marianne Vos (NED)	+ 2' 02"	16
6	Russia	Tatiana Antoshina (RUS)	+ 3' 07"	15
6	Russia	Alexandra Burchenkova (RUS)	+ 3' 07"	15
6	Russia	Yulia Iliynikh (RUS)	+ 3' 07"	15
6	Russia	Olga Zabelinskaya (RUS)	+ 3' 07"	15
7	Hitec Products–UCK	Lisa Brennauer (NOR)	+ 3' 20"	14
7	Hitec Products–UCK	Emma Johansson (NOR)	+ 3' 20"	14
7	Hitec Products–UCK	Emilie Moberg (NOR)	+ 3' 20"	14
7	Hitec Products–UCK	Sara Mustonen (NOR)	+ 3' 20"	14
7	Hitec Products–UCK	Lise Nöstvold (NOR)	+ 3' 20"	14
8	Germany		+ 4' 12"	13
9	Lotto–Honda Team		+ 4' 20"	12
10	MCipollini–Giambenini		+ 4' 26"	11

Results from uci.ch.
