= Velocio–SRAM Pro Cycling =

Cycling team

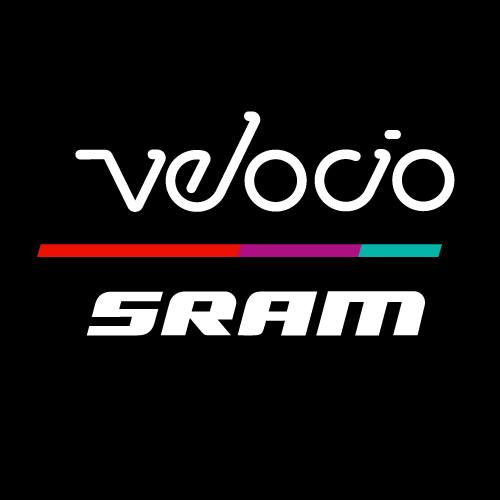

Team information
- UCI code: SLU
- Registered: United States (2003–2011 & 2013–2014); Germany (2012 & 2015)
- Founded: 2003
- Disbanded: 2015 (Canyon-SRAM set up for 2016 by Ronny Lauke)
- Discipline: Road
- Status: UCI Women's Team
- Bicycles: 2003–2008 Giant; 2009–2011 Scott; 2012–2014 Specialized; 2015 Cervélo

Key personnel
- General manager: Kristy Scrymgeour
- Team managers: Ronny Lauke; Jens Zemke

Team name history
- 2003 2004–2007 2007–2008 2008 2009 2009 2010 2011 2012 2013–2014 2015: Team T-Mobile; Team T-Mobile Women; Team High Road Women; Team Columbia Women; Team Columbia–High Road Women; Team Columbia–HTC Women; Team HTC–Columbia Women; HTC–Highroad Women; Team Specialized–lululemon; Specialized–lululemon; Velocio–SRAM Pro Cycling

Velocio–SRAM Pro Cycling, formerly known as Specialized–lululemon, was a professional cycling team based in the United States that competes in elite road bicycle racing and track cycling events. The final-season title sponsors were SRAM Corporation and Cervelo bicycles. Velocio Sports was the holding company for the team and the place-holder during a larger search for a title sponsor.

Before 2012, the team was owned by Bob Stapleton's High Road Sports and was known in 2011 as HTC–Highroad Women. Following HTC's withdrawal of sponsorship and the failure to find a replacement sponsor, a new company, Velocio Sports, directed by High Road's former Marketing and Communications officer Kristy Scrymgeour, was set up to own the team, but most of the riders and other staff remained the same. High Road also operated an elite men's professional team known most recently as HTC–Highroad, which disbanded.

Prior to 2008, the team was named T-Mobile Women. Columbia Sportswear were a title sponsor from July 2008 until the end of 2010.

In August 2015, Scrymgeour announced that the team would be disbanded at the end of the 2015 season. Under Scrymgeour's management, and with the introduction of team time trials world championships for trade teams in 2012, the team has won every TTT world championships in the team's existence.

== History ==
=== 2009 ===
The main new riders for the team were the European Time Travel Champion Ellen van Dijk and the Canadian national champion Alex Wrubleski. Alexis Rhodes and Madeleine Sandig left the team and Anke Wichmann and Oenone Wood both retired.

=== 2011 ===
The main new riders for the team were the Americans Amber Neben and Amanda Miller and the German time trial champion Charlotte Becker. Sadly, in January, Carla Swart died whilst training after being hit by a truck. After winning a stage, Ellen van Dijk won the Ladies Tour of Qatar which was the 400th victory for the team (men's and women's) since 2008. Ina Teutenberg won the fifth round in the Women's World Cup and the team won the seventh round, the Open de Suède Vårgårda team time trial. The team finished second overall in the World Cup. Judith Arndt finished fourth in the individual standings and Teutenberg fifth. At the end of the season Arndt took the third place in the UCI World Ranking, Teutenberg fourth and the team ended in second place in the team classification.

=== 2012 ===
After the men's team HTC–Highroad stopped, Kristy Scrymgeour convinced manufacturer Specialized and sports apparel company Lululemon Athletica to perpetuate the women's team in this Olympic year. The team changed slightly: Clara Hughes and Trixi Worrack were the main new recruits, while Judith Arndt, team leader since 2006, joined GreenEdge–AIS. The team had a great year. Ina-Yoko Teutenberg won numerous sprints and finished fourth in the road race of the Olympic Games. Evelyn Stevens had an excellent season by winning at the world cup race Flèche Wallonne, she won a prestigious stage of the Giro d'Italia Femminile and finished on the podium in the end and she won the general classification of the La Route de France. At the end of the season the team was in fourth place in the UCI World Ranking. Ellen van Dijk won the general classification of the Lotto–Decca Tour, the Omloop van Borsele and several stage races. The team dominated especially in the team time trials. Ellen van Dijk together with Stevens, Hughes, Amber Neben and Trixi Worrack or Teutenberg were consistent and undefeated the whole year. At the end of the season the team won the first team time trial at the world championship which was a main goal for the team this year. The team finished second in the UCI World Ranking.

=== 2013 ===
Three riders joined the team in 2013, American cyclists Carmen Small and Tayler Wiles, and the Canadian Gillian Carleton. Charlotte Becker, Emilia Fahlin, Chloe Hosking, Clara Hughes and Amber Neben left the team in the post-Olympic year. The year was marked with a crash of Ina-Yoko Teutenberg at the Drenste 8 in March. She was unable to ride for the remainder of the season and ended her career afterwards. Ellen van Dijk became the leader of the team and had a great season. She won the general classification of a stage race four times as well as several one-day races and finished four times on the podium in World Cup races. Above all she won the World Time Trial Championships. Van Dijk finished 3rd in the final World Cup standings and also 3rd in the UCI World Ranking. Evelyn Stevens had to miss the Tour of Flanders due to a fall. She finished fifth in the Giro Rosa, third in the Route de France, with the American Team and finished behind teammates Ellen van Dijk and Carmen Small (3rd place), fourth in the time trial at the World Championships. She finished ultimately 7th in the UCI world Ranking. The team was, like last year, undefeated in the team time trials and won the World Team Time Trial Championships in September. The team finished 3rd in the UCI World Ranking.

=== 2014 ===
After being part of the team since 2005, Ina-Yoko Teutenberg left the team for her retirement. Also Ellen van Dijk, the top UCI ranked and best rider of the 2013 season left the team, together with Gillian Carleton and Katie Colclough. The team attracted Chantal Blaak, Karol-Ann Canuel, Élise Delzenne and Tiffany Cromwell, with the last becoming the leader of the team. After losing the backing of the two major sponsors (Lululemon and Specialized) the team announced that Cervelo would return to the Women's peloton and become a partner of the new team with SRAM also entering the team as a title sponsor as the team becomes rebranded into Velocio–SRAM Pro Cycling.

=== 2015 ===
In preparation for the 2015 season the team signed Barbara Guarischi and Alena Amialiusik, as well as signing contract extensions with Loren Rowney, Élise Delzenne, Karol-Ann Canuel and Trixi Worrack.

== National, continental and world champions ==
2003
United States Road Race Championships, Amber Neben
United States Time Trial Championships, Kimberly Bruckner Baldwin
2004
United States Road Race Championships, Kristin Armstrong
2005
United States Time Trial Championships, Kristin Armstrong
United States U23 Time Trial Championships, Rebecca Much
2006
Canada Cyclo-cross Championships, Lyne Bessette
2007
World Track Championship (Points Race), Kates Bates
European U23 Time Trial Championship, Linda Villumsen
2008
Australia Road Race Championship, Oenone Wood
Denmark Time Trial Championship, Linda Villumsen
Denmark Road Championship, Linda Villumsen
Sweden Road Championship, Emilia Fahlin
Germany Road Championship, Luise Keller
2009
Sweden Time Trial Championship, Emilia Fahlin
Denmark Time Trial Championship, Linda Villumsen
Denmark Road Race Championship, Linda Villumsen
Germany Road Race Championship, Ina-Yoko Teutenberg
European U23 Time Trial Championships, Ellen van Dijk
2010
Australia Criterium Championship, Chloe Hosking
Sweden Road Race Championship, Emilia Fahlin
Sweden Time Trial Championship, Emilia Fahlin
United States Time Trial Championship, Evelyn Stevens
Germany Time Trial Championship, Judith Arndt
Netherlands Track Championship (Individual Pursuit), Ellen van Dijk
2011
World Time Trial Championship, Judith Arndt
Sweden Time Trial Championship, Emilia Fahlin
United States Time Trial Championship, Evelyn Stevens
Germany Time Trial Championship, Judith Arndt
Germany Road Championship, Ina-Yoko Teutenberg
Netherlands Track Championship (Individual Pursuit), Ellen van Dijk
Netherlands Track Championship (Madison), Ellen van Dijk
2012
Pan American Time Trial Championship, Amber Neben
Dutch Time Trial Championship, Ellen van Dijk
Canada Time Trial Championship, Clara Hughes
United States Time Trial Championship, Amber Neben
World Team Time Trial Championships, Ellen van Dijk, Charlotte Becker, Amber Neben, Evelyn Stevens, Ina-Yoko Teutenberg, Trixi Worrack
2013
German Cyclo-cross Championships, Trixi Worrack
United States Time Trial Championship, Carmen Small
Dutch Time Trial Championships, Ellen van Dijk
German Time Trial Championships, Lisa Brennauer
German Road Race Championships, Trixi Worrack
German Track Championships (Individual Pursuit), Lisa Brennauer
World Team Time Trial Championships, Evelyn Stevens, Ellen van Dijk, Lisa Brennauer, Katie Colclough, Trixi Worrack and Carmen Small
World Individual Time Trial Championships, Ellen van Dijk
2014
Pan American Time Trial Championship, Evelyn Stevens
German Time Trial Championships, Lisa Brennauer
German Road Race Championships, Lisa Brennauer
France National Track Championships (Points race), Élise Delzenne
France National Track Championships (Scratch race), Élise Delzenne
German Track Championships (Individual Pursuit), Mieke Kröger
World Individual Time Trial Championships, Lisa Brennauer
World Team Time Trial Championships, Chantal Blaak, Lisa Brennauer, Karol-Ann Canuel, Carmen Small, Evelyn Stevens, Trixi Worrack
2015
Canada Time Trial, Karol-Ann Canuel
Belarus Time Trial Championships, Alena Amialiusik
German Road Race Championships, Trixi Worrack
German Time Trial Championships, Mieke Kröger
Belarus Road Race Championships, Alena Amialiusik
World Team Time Trial Championships, Alena Amialiusik, Lisa Brennauer, Karol-Ann Canuel, Barbara Guarishi, Mieke Kröger, Trixi Worrack

== Team roster ==
As of 1 January 2015. Ages as of 1 January 2015.

Rider	Date of birth
Alena Amialiusik (BLR)	February 6, 1989 (aged 25)
Lisa Brennauer (GER)	June 8, 1988 (aged 26)
Karol-Ann Canuel (CAN)	April 18, 1988 (aged 26)
Tiffany Cromwell (AUS)	July 6, 1988 (aged 26)
Élise Delzenne (FRA)	January 28, 1989 (aged 25)

Rider	Date of birth
Barbara Guarischi (ITA)	February 10, 1990 (aged 24)
Mieke Kröger (GER)	July 18, 1993 (aged 21)
Loren Rowney (AUS)	October 14, 1988 (aged 26)
Tayler Wiles (USA)	July 20, 1989 (aged 25)
Trixi Worrack (GER)	September 28, 1981 (aged 33)

== See also ==
- List of Team Specialized–lululemon riders
