= Amanda Miller (cyclist) =

American cyclist

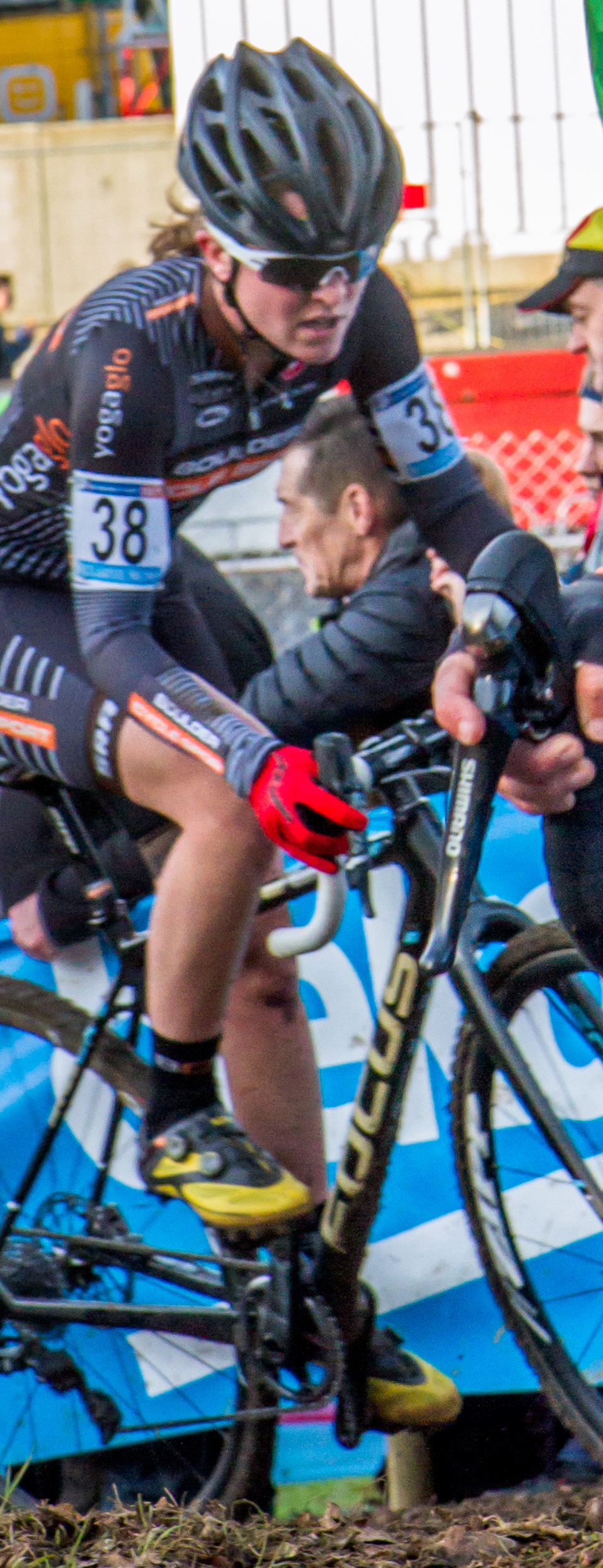

Personal information
- Born: December 13, 1986 (age 39) Burlington, Iowa
- Height: 5 ft 6 in (168 cm)
- Weight: 115 lb (52 kg)

Cycling career
- Sport: Cycling
- Current team: Visit Dallas DNA Pro Cycling
- Disciplines: Road, mountain biking and cyclo-cross
- Role: Rider

Amateur teams
- 2006-2007: Atlas Cycling
- 2008: Mesa Cycles

Professional teams
- 2009: LipSmacker Professional Women's Cycling Team
- 2010: Team TIBCO-To The Top
- 2011: HTC Highroad Women
- 2012-2014: Team TIBCO-To The Top
- 2015: Pepper Palace Pro Cycling p/b The Happy Tooth
- 2016-: Visit Dallas DNA Pro Cycling

Amanda Miller (born December 13, 1986) is an American racing cyclist. Miller played basketball while at school and originally took up cycling as a means of maintaining fitness during the off-season, riding in her first race in 2005. She rode at the 2014 UCI Road World Championships. In November 2015 she was named as a member of the Visit Dallas DNA Pro Cycling team's squad for the 2016 season.

== See also ==
- 2011 HTC-Highroad Women season
