= Rossella Callovi =

Italian cyclist (born 1991)

Personal information
- Born: 5 April 1991 (age 35)

Cycling career
- Sport: Cycling
- Discipline: Road cycling / track cycling
- Role: Rider

Professional teams
- 2013: Pasta Zara–Cogeas
- 2015: Top Girls Fassa Bortolo

Major wins
- Junior road world champion

Rossella Callovi (born 5 April 1991) is an Italian professional road and track racing cyclist. On the road she won as junior the gold medal in the road race at 2009 junior world championships in Moscow and the silver medal in the road race at the 2008 junior world championships in Cape Town. At the 2010 UCI Road World Championships she competed in the women's èlite road race. On the track she won as a junior the bronze medal in the Junior Women's Team Pursuit at the 2008 UEC European Track Championships. At the 2010 European Track Championships she competed in the women's team pursuit.

== See also ==
- Pasta Zara-Cogeas
