= Alessandra D'Ettorre =

Italian cyclist

Personal information
- Full name: Alessandra D'Ettorre
- Born: 8 May 1978 (age 48)

Cycling career
- Sport: Cycling
- Role: Rider

Alessandra D'Ettorre (born 8 May 1978) is an Italian racing cyclist. She competed in the 2013 UCI women's team time trial in Florence.
