= Monia Baccaille =

Italian cyclist

Personal information
- Full name: Monia Baccaille
- Born: 10 April 1984 (age 42) Marsciano, Italy

Cycling career
- Sport: Cycling
- Current team: MCipollini-Giambenini
- Disciplines: Road, Track
- Role: Rider

Professional teams
- 2006–7: Saccarelli EMU Marsciano
- 2008: Fenixs
- 2009: Gauss RDZ Ormu-Colnago
- 2009: S.C. Michela Fanini Record Rox
- 2010: Team Valdarno
- 2011-12: MCipollini-Giambenini

Monia Baccaille (born 10 April 1984 in Marsciano) is an Italian professional cyclist. She competed at the 2012 Summer Olympics in the Women's road race, but finished over the time limit.

== Notable results ==
2005

- Tour of Flanders for Women (3rd)

2006

- Coppa de Laghi (1st)
- Trophée d'Or Féminin (1 stage, 3rd overall)

2008

- Grand Prix Elsy Jacobs (1st)

2009

- Italian National Road Race Championships (1st)

2010

- Grand Prix Elsy Jacobs (2nd)
- Italian National Road Race Championships (1st)
- GP Liberazione (1st)

2011

- Tour of Chongming Island (3rd)
- Ladies Tour of Qatar (1st stage 3)
- GP de Dottignies (2nd)

2012

- Tour of Chongming Island (2nd overall, 1st stage 2)
- Tour of Chongming Island World Cup (3rd)
- GP de Dottignies (1st)

2014 – Alé Cipollini 2014 season
