= Garmin–Cervélo (women) =

Women's cycling team

Team information
- Registered: United Kingdom
- Founded: 2005
- Disbanded: 2011
- Discipline: Road
- Status: UCI Women's Team

Key personnel
- Team manager: Priska Doppmann

Team name history
- 2005–2006 2007 2008 2009–2010 2011: Univega Pro Cycling Team; Raleigh-Lifeforce-Creation; Cervélo-Lifeforce Pro Cycling Team; Cervélo TestTeam; Garmin–Cervélo

Garmin–Cervélo was an elite professional women's cycling team registered in Great Britain and racing on the UCI Women's Road World Cup circuit. The team was previously known was Cervélo-Lifeforce Pro Cycling Team, but in 2009, with the creation of the UCI Professional Continental team Cervélo TestTeam, the women's team changed names to match the men's team. When the men's Cervélo TestTeam merged with Garmin–Transitions for the 2011 season, the team changed names again, becoming Garmin–Cervélo to again match the men's team. In 2007, the team was known as Raleigh-Lifeforce-Creation and prior to 2007, the team was known as the Univega Pro Cycling Team.

The Garmin–Cervélo women's team disbanded at the end of 2011 due to funding problems. Six of its ten riders, including all four Britons, transferred to the AA Drink–leontien.nl team for the 2012 season.

== History ==
=== 2009 ===
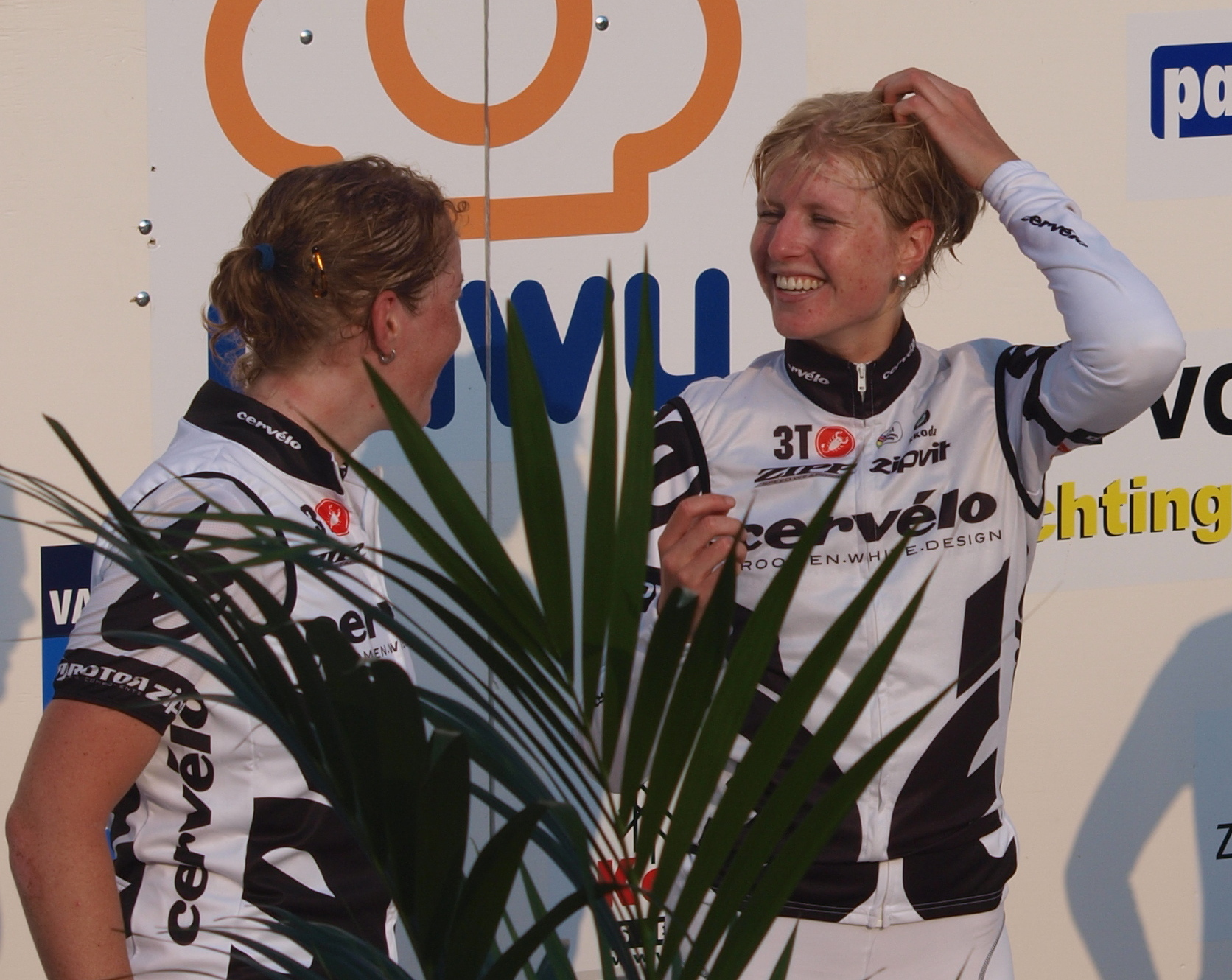
Regina Bruins and Kirsten Wild finished 1st and 2nd at the 2009 Dutch Time Trial Championship

== Rosters ==
=== 2011 ===
Ages as of 1 January 2011.

Rider	Date of birth
Elizabeth Armitstead (GBR)	December 18, 1988 (age 37)
Noemi Cantele (ITA)	July 17, 1981 (age 45)
Jessie Daams (BEL)	May 28, 1990 (age 36)
Sarah-Lena Hofmann (GER)	April 24, 1992 (aged 18)
Sharon Laws (GBR)	July 7, 1974 (age 52)
Lucy Martin (GBR)	May 5, 1990 (age 36)

Rider	Date of birth
Emma Pooley (GBR)	October 3, 1982 (age 43)
Alex Rhodes (AUS)	December 1, 1984 (age 41)
Carla Ryan (AUS)	September 21, 1985 (age 40)
Trine Schmidt (DEN)	June 3, 1988 (age 38)
Iris Slappendel (NED)	February 18, 1985 (age 41)

=== 2006 ===
Ages as of 1 January 2006.

Rider	Date of birth
Priska Doppmann (SUI)	May 10, 1971 (aged 34)
Sarah Grab (SUI)	July 13, 1979 (aged 26)
Sereina Trachsel (SUI)	February 9, 1981 (aged 24)
Karin Thürig (SUI)	July 4, 1972 (aged 33)
Christiane Soeder (AUT)	January 15, 1975 (aged 30)
Emma Rickards (AUS)	November 17, 1973 (aged 32)

Rider	Date of birth
Joanne Kiesanowski (NZL)	May 24, 1979 (aged 26)
Sarah Düster (GER)	July 10, 1982 (aged 23)
Nicole Cooke (GBR)	April 13, 1983 (aged 22)
Pascale Schnider (SUI)	October 18, 1984 (aged 21)
Franziska Roethlin (SUI)	March 15, 1979 (aged 26)

=== 2005 ===
Ages as of 1 January 2005.

Rider	Date of birth
Priska Doppmann (SUI)	May 10, 1971 (aged 33)
Sarah Grab (SUI)	July 13, 1979 (aged 25)
Sereina Trachsel (SUI)	February 9, 1981 (aged 23)
Karin Thürig (SUI)	July 4, 1972 (aged 32)

Rider	Date of birth
Diana Rast (SUI)	August 28, 1970 (aged 34)
Christiane Soeder (AUT)	January 15, 1975 (aged 29)
Emma Rickards (AUS)	November 17, 1973 (aged 31)
Franziska Roethlin (SUI)	March 15, 1979 (aged 25)

== Major wins ==
2005
Souvenir Magali Pache Lausanne, Karin Thurig
Prologue Tour de l'Aude Cycliste Féminin, Christiane Soeder
Stages 5 & 8 Tour de l'Aude Cycliste Féminin, Karin Thurig
Overall Tour Cycliste féminin, Priska Doppmann

Stage 2, Christiane Soeder
Stage 3, Edwige Pitel
Stage 4, Emma Rickards
Stage 6, Priska Doppmann

Overall Tour Féminin en Limousin, Edwige Pitel

Stage 3b, Edwige Pitel

Chrono des Herbiers, Edwige Pitel
2006
Stage 1 Geelong Tour, Christiane Soeder
Stage 3 Novilon Eurocup Ronde van Drenthe, Joanne Kiesanowski
La Flèche Wallonne, Nicole Cooke
Souvenir Magali Pache Lausanne, Nicole Cooke
Gran Premio Castilla y Leon, Nicole Cooke
Stage 4 Tour de l'Aude Cycliste Féminin, Joanne Kiesanowski
Stage 6 Tour de l'Aude Cycliste Féminin, Priska Doppmann
Overall Tour Cycliste féminin, Nicole Cooke

Stages 1 & 4, Nicole Cooke
Stage 2b, Joanne Kiesanowski
Stage 3, Emma Richards

Overall International Thüringen Rundfahrt der Frauen, Nicole Cooke

Prologue, Christiane Soeder
Stages 2, 4, 5 & 6 Nicole Cooke

Chrono des Herbiers, Priska Doppmann
Chrono Champenois – Trophée Européen, Karin Thurig
2006 UCI Women's Road World Cup, Team standings champion
2007
Overall Geelong Tour, Nicole Cooke
Geelong – Women's World Cup, Nicole Cooke
GP Costa Etrusca, Nicole Cooke
Trofeo Alfredo Binda, Nicole Cooke
Ronde van Vlaanderen voor Vrouwen, Nicole Cooke
Prologue Tour de l'Aude Cycliste Féminin, Christiane Soeder
Overall Tour Cycliste féminin, Nicole Cooke

Stage 1, Karin Thurig
Stage 2, 3a & 5 Priska Doppmann
Stage 3b, Nicole Cooke
Stage 4, Tanja Slater

Stage 5a International Thüringen Rundfahrt der Frauen, Christiane Soeder
Albstadt-Frauen-Etappenrennen, Nicole Cooke
Memorial Davide Fardelli – Cronometro Individuale, Karin Thurig
Chrono Champenois – Trophée Européen, Karin Thurig
2007 UCI Women's Road World Cup, Team standings champion
2008
Overall Geelong Tour, Christiane Soeder

Stage 1, Christiane Soeder

Overall Tour of New Zealand, Kristin Armstrong

Stages 3 & 5, Kristin Armstrong

Giro dei Comuni Ribardella-Montescudaio, Kristin Armstrong
Novilon Eurocup Ronde van Drenthe, Kristin Armstrong
Souvenir Magali Pache Lausanne, Christiane Soeder
Stages 1 & 3 Mt Hood Cycling Classic, Joanne Kiesanowski
Overall Tour Cycliste féminin, Christiane Soeder

Stage 5, Karin Thurig
Stage 7, Christiane Soeder

Team classification, Tour de Feminin – Krasna Lipa (2.2W)

Stage 5 Tour de Feminin – Krasna Lipa, Priska Doppmann

Stage 2 Tour Féminin de Bretagne, Joanne Kiesanowski
Stage 2 International Thüringen Rundfahrt der Frauen, Priska Doppmann
Stage 5 International Thüringen Rundfahrt der Frauen, Karin Thurig
Olympic TimeTrial Championship, Kristin Armstrong
Memorial Davide Fardelli, Karin Thurig
Chrono Champenois – Trophée Européen, Karin Thurig
General classification Cascade Cycling Classic, Kristin Armstrong

Points classification Cascade Cycling Classic, Kristin Armstrong

2009
Overall Ladies Tour of Qatar, Kirsten Wild
GP Costa Etrusca, Emma Pooley
Giro dei Comuni Ribardella-Montescudaio, Sarah Düster
Grand Prix de Dottignies, Sarah Düster
Omloop van Borsele, Kirsten Wild
GP Stad Roeselare, Kirsten Wild
Grand Prix de Suisse, Chrisitane Soeder
Berner-Rundfahrt- WE, Kristin Armstrong
Overall Tour de l'Aude Cycliste Féminin, Claudia Häusler

Stage 5, Kristin Armstrong

La Coupe du Monde Cycliste Féminine de Montréal, Emma Pooley
Overall Tour du Grand Montréal, Kirsten Wild

Stages 1, 2 & 4, Kirsten Wild
Stage 3, Regina Bruins

Overall Tour Cycliste féminin, Emma Pooley

Stages 1 & 3, Emma Pooley
Stage 2, Christiane Soeder

Overall Giro d'Italia Femminile, Claudia Häusler

Points classification, Claudia Häusler
Prologue & Stage 9, Kirsten Wild
Stage 7, Claudia Häusler

Stage 4 International Thüringen Rundfahrt der Frauen, Christiane Soeder
GP de Plouay, Emma Pooley
Stages 1, 3 & 4 BrainWash Ladies Tour, Kirsten Wild
Rund um die Nürnberger Altstadt – WE, Kirsten Wild
Overall Tour Cycliste Féminin International Ardèche, Kristin Armstrong

Stages 1 & 2, Christiane Soeder
Stage 3, Kristin Armstrong

2009 UCI Women's Road World Cup, Team standings champion
2010
Overall Ladies Tour of Qatar, Kirsten Wild

Stage 3, Kirsten Wild

Grand Prix de Dottignies, Kirsten Wild
Ronde van Gelderland, Kirsten Wild
La Flèche Wallonne – WE, Emma Pooley
Omloop van Borsele, Kirsten Wild
GP Stad Roeselare, Kirsten Wild
Grand Prix de Suisse, Emma Pooley
Grand Prix Elsy Jacobs, Emma Pooley
Stage 2 Tour of Chongming Island, Kirsten Wild
Overall Tour de l'Aude Cycliste Féminin, Emma Pooley

Prologue, Regina Bruins
Stage 1, Lizzie Armitstead
Stage 7, Emma Pooley

Overall Rabobank Ster Zeeuwsche Eilanden, Kirsten Wild

Stages 1 & 2, Kirsten Wild

G.P. Ciudad de Valladolid, Charlotte Becker
Therme kasseienomloop, Regina Bruins
Iurreta-Emakumeen Bira, Claudia Häusler
Overall Giro del Trentino Alto Adige-Südtirol, Emma Pooley
Stage 1, Emma Pooley
Stage 5 International Thüringen Rundfahrt der Frauen, Sarah Düster
Stage 6 International Thüringen Rundfahrt der Frauen, Iris Slappendel
Open de Suède Vårgårda, Kirsten Wild
Stage 1 Route de France Féminine, Sarah Düster
Stage 7 Route de France Féminine, Lizzie Armistead
GP de Plouay, Emma Pooley
Stages 4 & 5 BrainWash Ladies Tour, Kirsten Wild
Stage 1 Tour Cycliste Féminin International Ardèche, Sharon Laws
Stages 3, 4 & 5, Tour Cycliste Féminin International Ardèche, Lizzie Armitstead
Stage 6 Tour Cycliste Féminin International Ardèche, Carla Ryan
Giro della Toscana Femminile – Memorial Michela Fanini, Kirsten Wild
2011
Trofeo Alfredo Binda, Emma Pooley
Stage 3a Iurreta-Emakumeen Bira, Emma Pooley
Stage 1 Tour of Chongming Island, Lizzie Armitstead
Stage 8 Giro d'Italia Femminile, Emma Pooley
Stage 4 International Thüringen Rundfahrt der Frauen, Emma Pooley
Stage 6 International Thüringen Rundfahrt der Frauen, Lizzie Armitstead
Stage 3 Tour Cycliste Féminin International Ardèche, Emma Pooley

== National, continental and world champions ==
2005
Swiss Roacd Race Championship, Sereina Traschel
French Time Trial Championship, Edwige Pitel
Austrian Time Trial Championship, Christiane Soeder
World TimeTrial Championship, Karin Thurig
2006
New Zealand Track Championship (Points race), Joanne Kiesanowski
British Road Race Championship, Nicole Cooke
Austrian Road Race Championship, Christiane Soeder
Austrian Time Trial Championship, Christiane Soeder
2007
New Zealand Track Championship (Points race), Joanne Kiesanowski
Austrian Criterium Championship, Christiane Soeder
Austrian Time Trial Championship, Christiane Soeder
Swiss Road Race Championship, Sereina Traschel
British Road Race Championship, Nicole Cooke
Swiss Hill Climb Championship, Priska Doppmann
2008
Austrian Criterium Championship, Christiane Soeder
Swiss Time Trial Championship, Karin Thürig
2009
Australian Time Trial Championship, Carla Ryan
Australian Road Race Championship, Carla Ryan
Austrian Road Race Championships, Christiane Soeder
Dutch Time Trial Championship, Regina Bruins
British Time Trial Championship, Emma Pooley
Austrian Time Trial Championship, Christiane Soeder
World Time Trial Championship, Kristin Armstrong
2010
German Road Race Championship, Charlotte Becker
Swiss Road Race Championship, Emilie Aubry
British Road Race Championship, Emma Pooley
British Time Trial Championship, Emma Pooley
German Track Championship (Individual pursuit), Charlotte Becker
World Time Trial Championship, Emma Pooley
Dutch Track Championship (Points race), Kirsten Wild
2011
British Track Championship (Points race), Lizzie Armitstead
Australian Road Race Championships, Alexis Rhodes
Italian Road Race Championship, Noemi Cantele
British Road Race Championship, Lizzie Armitstead
Italian Time Trial Championship, Noemi Cantele
British Track Championship (Scratch race), Lizzie Armitstead
