= List of 2010 UCI Women's Teams and riders =

Listed below are the UCI Women's Teams that competed in the 2010 women's road cycling events organized by the International Cycling Union (UCI) including the 2010 UCI Women's Road World Cup.

== Teams overview ==
UCI code	Team Name	Country
KSK	Kuota Speed Kueens	Austria
LLT	Lotto Ladies Team	Belgium
RSC	Redsun Cycling Team	Belgium
VLL	Topsport Vlaanderen–Thompson	Belgium
BPD	Bizkaia–Durango	Spain
DKT	Debabarrena–Kirolgi	Spain
LTK	Lointek	Spain
ESG	ESGL 93–GSD Gestion	France
FUT	Vienne Futuroscope	France
TCW	Team HTC–Columbia Women (2010 season)	Germany
NUR	Noris Cycling	Germany
GPC	Giant Pro Cycling	Hong Kong
USC	ACS Chirio–Forno d'Asolo	Italy
GAU	Gauss RDZ Ormu	Italy
MIC	S.C. Michela Fanini Record Rox	Italy
VAD	Team Valdarno	Italy
TOG	Top Girls Fassa Bortolo-Ghezzi	Italy
VAI	Vaiano Solaristech	Italy
SAF	Safi–Pasta Zara	Lithuania
CWT	Cervélo TestTeam	Netherlands
LNL	Leontien.nl	Netherlands
ARC	Nederland Bloeit	Netherlands
HPU	Hitec Products UCK	Norway
MTW	MTN	South Africa
FEN	Fenixs–Petrogradets	Russia
AGG	Alriksson Go:green	Sweden
TIB	Tibco–To The Top	United States

== Riders ==
=== Kuota Speed Kueens ===
Ages as of 1 January 2010.

Rider	Date of birth
Pelin Cizgin (AUT)	April 29, 1986 (aged 23)
Anna Maria Gürtler (AUT)	July 6, 1991 (aged 18)
Michaela Matzbacher (AUT)	April 12, 1980 (aged 29)
Amber Pierce (USA)	March 25, 1981 (aged 28)

Rider	Date of birth
Daniela Pintarelli (AUT)	November 10, 1983 (aged 26)
Elisabeth Reiner (AUT)	September 21, 1983 (aged 26)
Bernadette Schober (AUT)	July 15, 1984 (aged 25)
Bettina Barbara Tesar (AUT)	March 2, 1982 (aged 27)

=== Lotto Ladies Team ===
Ages as of 1 January 2010.

Rider	Date of birth
Veronica Andrèasson (SWE)	March 6, 1981 (aged 28)
Tiffany Cromwell (AUS)	July 6, 1988 (aged 21)
Sofie De Vuyst (BEL)	April 2, 1987 (aged 22)
Catherine Delfosse (BEL)	June 11, 1981 (aged 28)
Elise Depoorter (BEL)	February 9, 1988 (aged 21)
Rochelle Gilmore (AUS)	December 14, 1981 (aged 28)
Elizabeth Hatch (USA)	June 3, 1980 (aged 29)
Lien Lanssens (BEL)	February 1, 1989 (aged 20)

Rider	Date of birth
Ashleigh Moolman-Pasio (RSA)	December 9, 1985 (aged 24)
Lizanne Naude (RSA)	January 17, 1984 (aged 25)
Kim Schoonbaert (BEL)	March 2, 1986 (aged 23)
Nimesha Smith (NZL)	March 17, 1977 (aged 32)
Josephine Tomic (AUS)	June 9, 1989 (aged 20)
Annelies Van Doorslaer (BEL)	January 15, 1989 (aged 20)
Grace Verbeke (BEL)	November 12, 1984 (aged 25)
Vicki Whitelaw (AUS)	January 2, 1977 (aged 32)

=== Redsun Cycling Team ===
Ages as of 1 January 2010.

Rider	Date of birth
Anne Arnouts (BEL)	October 17, 1989 (aged 20)
Paulina Brzeźna (POL)	September 10, 1981 (aged 28)
Latoya Brulee (BEL)	December 9, 1988 (aged 21)
Petra Dijkman (NED)	November 13, 1979 (aged 30)
Ludivine Henrion (BEL)	January 23, 1984 (aged 25)
Emma Johansson (SWE)	September 23, 1983 (aged 26)
Inge Klep (NED)	July 15, 1981 (aged 28)

Rider	Date of birth
Birgit Lavrijssen (NED)	January 16, 1991 (aged 18)
Marie Lindberg (SWE)	August 14, 1987 (aged 22)
Mascha Pijnenborg (NED)	June 30, 1981 (aged 28)
Emma Silversides (GBR)	October 2, 1978 (aged 31)
Hannah Verhaeghe (BEL)	December 17, 1988 (aged 21)
Laure Werner (BEL)	February 22, 1981 (aged 28)

=== Topsport Vlaanderen–Thompson ===
Ages as of 1 January 2010.

Rider	Date of birth
Els Belmans (BEL)	March 30, 1983 (aged 26)
Ine Beyen (BEL)	May 1, 1987 (aged 22)
Jolien D'Hoore (BEL)	March 14, 1990 (aged 19)
Jessie Daams (BEL)	May 28, 1990 (aged 19)
Kelly Druyts (BEL)	October 21, 1989 (aged 20)

Rider	Date of birth
Sjoukje Dufoer (BEL)	October 5, 1987 (aged 22)
Maaike Polspoel (BEL)	March 28, 1989 (aged 20)
Katrien Van Looy (BEL)	June 19, 1989 (aged 20)
Anisha Vekemans (BEL)	August 17, 1991 (aged 18)

=== Bizkaia–Durango ===
Ages as of 1 January 2010.

Rider	Date of birth
Cristina Alcalde Huertanos (ESP)	March 3, 1980 (aged 29)
Polona Batagelj (SLO)	June 7, 1989 (aged 20)
Ana Garcia Antequera (ESP)	January 30, 1981 (aged 28)
Monica Hernandez (MEX)	August 11, 1985 (aged 24)
Pilar Martin (ESP)	February 4, 1991 (aged 18)
Amaia Martioda (ESP)	May 12, 1990 (aged 19)
Sara Ortiz Mato (ESP)	November 5, 1986 (aged 23)

Rider	Date of birth
Gema Pascual Torrecilla (ESP)	January 12, 1979 (aged 30)
Catalina Rayo Ramis (ESP)	August 18, 1990 (aged 19)
Anna Sanchis Chafer (ESP)	October 18, 1987 (aged 22)
Davina Summers (AUS)	June 3, 1979 (aged 30)
Ariadna Tudel Cuberes (AND)	November 17, 1978 (aged 31)
Dorleta Zorrilla Braceras (ESP)	May 25, 1989 (aged 20)

=== Debabarrena–Kirolgi ===
Ages as of 1 January 2010.

Rider	Date of birth
Ane Ciaran (ESP)	July 25, 1991 (aged 18)
Izaro Lasa (ESP)	May 8, 1987 (aged 22)
Eva Ledesma (ESP)	January 22, 1976 (aged 33)
Itsaso Leunda Coni (ESP)	March 3, 1984 (aged 25)
Leire Olaberria Dorronsoro (ESP)	February 17, 1977 (aged 32)
Sara Olite (ESP)	September 14, 1976 (aged 33)
Mireia Osa (ESP)	January 19, 1991 (aged 18)

Rider	Date of birth
Inmaculada Pereiro (ESP)	October 26, 1972 (aged 37)
Inma Rafael Salas (ESP)	January 5, 1976 (aged 33)
Irene San Sebastián Lasa (ESP)	February 21, 1990 (aged 19)
Ane Santesteban Gonzalez (ESP)	December 12, 1990 (aged 19)
Naiara Telletxea Lopez (ESP)	April 18, 1984 (aged 25)
Ana Yonta Diez (ESP)	October 25, 1975 (aged 34)

=== Lointek ===
Ages as of 1 January 2010.

Rider	Date of birth
Ester Alves (POR)	July 22, 1981 (aged 28)
Cristina Aznar (ESP)	August 3, 1990 (aged 19)
Mireia Epelde Bikendi (ESP)	October 29, 1985 (aged 24)
Débora Gálves Lopez (ESP)	May 17, 1985 (aged 24)
Leticia Gil Parra (ESP)	August 1, 1982 (aged 27)
Lucía González Blanco (ESP)	July 9, 1990 (aged 19)
Belén López Morales (ESP)	April 18, 1984 (aged 25)

Rider	Date of birth
Judith Masdeu Cort (ESP)	March 15, 1980 (aged 29)
Patricia Perez Jimenez (ESP)	November 23, 1986 (aged 23)
Fanny Riberot (FRA)	March 17, 1983 (aged 26)
Rosario Rodriguez Gomez (ESP)	June 11, 1982 (aged 27)
Anne-Marie Schmitt (LUX)	January 23, 1989 (aged 20)
Silvia Tirado Marquez (ESP)	July 27, 1986 (aged 23)

=== ESGL 93–GSD Gestion ===
Ages as of 1 January 2010.

Rider	Date of birth
Mélanie Bravard (FRA)	April 13, 1987 (aged 22)
Nathalie Cadol (FRA)	February 24, 1972 (aged 37)
Sophie Creux (FRA)	July 8, 1981 (aged 28)
Roxane Fournier (FRA)	November 7, 1991 (aged 18)
Elodie Hegoburu (FRA)	December 5, 1989 (aged 20)
Siobhan Horgan (IRL)	December 22, 1978 (aged 31)

Rider	Date of birth
Audrey Lemieux (CAN)	May 9, 1985 (aged 24)
Mélodie Lesueur (FRA)	March 12, 1990 (aged 19)
Christine Majerus (LUX)	February 25, 1987 (aged 22)
Eugenie Mermillod (FRA)	May 27, 1986 (aged 23)
Marion Rousse (FRA)	August 17, 1991 (aged 18)
Béatrice Thomas (FRA)	July 7, 1981 (aged 28)

=== Vienne Futuroscope ===
Ages as of 1 January 2010.

Rider	Date of birth
Julie Beveridge (CAN)	June 30, 1988 (aged 21)
Karol-Ann Canuel (CAN)	April 18, 1988 (aged 21)
Audrey Cordon-Ragot (FRA)	September 22, 1989 (aged 20)
Fiona Dutriaux (FRA)	January 25, 1989 (aged 20)
Christel Ferrier-Bruneau (FRA)	July 8, 1979 (aged 30)
Florence Girardet (FRA)	June 12, 1986 (aged 23)
Nathalie Jeuland (FRA)	December 9, 1985 (aged 24)

Rider	Date of birth
Pascale Jeuland (FRA)	June 2, 1987 (aged 22)
Jenifer Letue (FRA)	June 2, 1990 (aged 19)
Caroline Mani (FRA)	January 18, 1987 (aged 22)
Emmanuelle Merlot (FRA)	January 10, 1986 (aged 23)
Gabriela Slamova (CZE)	April 29, 1991 (aged 18)
Nadia Triquet-Claude (FRA)	October 25, 1978 (aged 31)

=== Team HTC–Columbia Women ===
Ages as of 1 January 2010.

Rider	Date of birth
Kim Anderson (USA)	January 28, 1968 (aged 41)
Judith Arndt (GER)	July 23, 1976 (aged 33)
Noemi Cantele (SWE)	July 17, 1981 (aged 28)
Ellen van Dijk (NED)	February 11, 1987 (aged 22)
Emilia Fahlin (SWE)	October 24, 1988 (aged 21)
Chloe Hosking (AUS)	October 1, 1990 (aged 19)

Rider	Date of birth
Luise Keller (GER)	March 8, 1984 (aged 25)
Evelyn Stevens (USA)	May 9, 1983 (aged 26)
Ina-Yoko Teutenberg (GER)	October 28, 1974 (aged 35)
Linda Villumsen (NZL)	April 9, 1985 (aged 24)
Adrie Visser (NED)	October 19, 1983 (aged 26)

=== Noris Cycling ===
Ages as of 1 January 2010.

Rider	Date of birth
Angela Hennig (GER)	January 15, 1981 (aged 28)
Jennifer Hohl (SUI)	March 3, 1986 (aged 23)
Marlen Jöhrend (GER)	January 2, 1986 (aged 23)
Romy Kasper (GER)	May 5, 1988 (aged 21)
Bianca Purath (GER)	January 4, 1985 (aged 24)

Rider	Date of birth
Madeleine Sandig (GER)	August 12, 1983 (aged 26)
Elke Gebhardt (GER)	July 22, 1983 (aged 26)
Trixi Worrack (GER)	September 28, 1981 (aged 28)
Stephanie Pohl (GER)	October 21, 1987 (aged 22)

=== Giant Pro Cycling ===
Ages as of 1 January 2010.

Rider	Date of birth
Gao Min (CHN)	January 26, 1982 (aged 27)
Gu Hui Li (CHN)	March 17, 1989 (aged 20)
Liu Xiao Hui (CHN)	August 5, 1989 (aged 20)
Liu Xin (CHN)	November 5, 1986 (aged 23)
Luo Xiaoling (CHN)	September 20, 1988 (aged 21)
Meng Lang (CHN)	March 6, 1984 (aged 25)
Shen Fan Li (CHN)	July 15, 1991 (aged 18)

Rider	Date of birth
Sheng Yongyan (CHN)	September 5, 1987 (aged 22)
Shi Lina (CHN)	January 12, 1991 (aged 18)
Sun Feiyan (CHN)	May 13, 1989 (aged 20)
Wang Cui (CHN)	October 15, 1989 (aged 20)
Wong Wan Yiu Jamie (HKG)	November 4, 1986 (aged 23)
Zhang Yuzhuo (CHN)	December 6, 1987 (aged 22)
Zhao Na (CHN)	April 29, 1984 (aged 25)

=== ACS Chirio–Forno d'Asolo ===
Ages as of 1 January 2010.

Rider	Date of birth
Odette Bertolin (ITA)	February 5, 1983 (aged 26)
Silvia Borile (ITA)	August 28, 1987 (aged 22)
Marina Gloria Chirio (ITA)	January 24, 1983 (aged 26)
Francesca Faustini (ITA)	December 27, 1988 (aged 21)
Uênia Fernandes de Souza (BRA)	August 12, 1984 (aged 25)
Márcia Fernandes Silva (BRA)	May 29, 1991 (aged 18)
Edita Janeliūnaitė (LTU)	December 16, 1988 (aged 21)
Rosane Kirch (BRA)	April 19, 1976 (aged 33)
Christina Kollmann (AUT)	March 14, 1988 (aged 21)

Rider	Date of birth
Olena Oliinyk (UKR)	May 3, 1989 (aged 20)
Tetyana Ryabchenko (UKR)	August 28, 1989 (aged 20)
Sari Saarelainen (FIN)	March 1, 1981 (aged 28)
Aleksandra Sošenko (LTU)	January 15, 1991 (aged 18)
Luisa Tamanini (ITA)	January 31, 1980 (aged 29)
Edita Ungurytė (LTU)	July 30, 1987 (aged 22)
Viktoriya Vologdina (UKR)	October 8, 1989 (aged 20)
Liisa Ehrberg (trainee) (EST)	December 17, 1988 (aged 21)

=== Gauss RDZ Ormu ===
Ages as of 1 January 2010.

Rider	Date of birth
Veronica Alessio (ITA)	December 12, 1987 (aged 22)
Alessandra Borchi (ITA)	August 15, 1983 (aged 26)
Giada Borgato (ITA)	June 15, 1989 (aged 20)
Martine Bras (NED)	May 17, 1978 (aged 31)
Giorgia Bronzini (ITA)	August 3, 1983 (aged 26)
Alice Donadoni (ITA)	December 8, 1988 (aged 21)

Rider	Date of birth
Elena Kuchinskaya (RUS)	December 11, 1984 (aged 25)
Yuliya Martisova (RUS)	June 15, 1976 (aged 33)
Flávia Oliveira (BRA)	October 27, 1981 (aged 28)
Edita Pučinskaitė (LTU)	November 27, 1975 (aged 34)
Eleonora Suelotto (ITA)	December 16, 1988 (aged 21)

=== S.C. Michela Fanini Record Rox ===
Ages as of 1 January 2010.

Rider	Date of birth
Samantha Galassi (ITA)	July 28, 1988 (aged 21)
Sara Grifi (ITA)	September 26, 1988 (aged 21)
Barbara Guarischi (ITA)	October 2, 1990 (aged 19)
Carly Hibberd (AUS)	May 11, 1985 (aged 24)
Giulia Lazzerini (ITA)	June 14, 1988 (aged 21)
Verónica Leal Balderas (MEX)	October 15, 1977 (aged 32)
Alice Marmorini (ITA)	January 11, 1987 (aged 22)

Rider	Date of birth
Serena Mensa (ITA)	May 7, 1989 (aged 20)
Nina Ovcharenko (UKR)	August 7, 1984 (aged 25)
Edwige Pitel (FRA)	June 4, 1967 (aged 42)
Martina Růžičková (CZE)	March 22, 1980 (aged 29)
Regina Schleicher (GER)	March 21, 1974 (aged 35)
Emma Skjerstad (NOR)	July 3, 1990 (aged 19)
Grete Treier (EST)	December 12, 1977 (aged 32)

=== Team Valdarno ===
Ages as of 1 January 2010.

Rider	Date of birth
Tatiana Antoshina (RUS)	July 27, 1982 (aged 27)
Bridie O'Donnell (AUS)	April 29, 1974 (aged 35)
Saneila Biagi (ITA)	September 19, 1988 (aged 21)
Chiara Bortolus (ITA)	June 7, 1988 (aged 21)
Martina Corazza (ITA)	June 8, 1979 (aged 30)
Tania Belvederesi (ITA)	January 31, 1978 (aged 31)
Giulia Bonetti (ITA)	November 12, 1989 (aged 20)

Rider	Date of birth
Laura Bozzolo (ITA)	September 28, 1985 (aged 24)
Alessia Massaccesi (ITA)	February 5, 1989 (aged 20)
Monia Baccaille (ITA)	April 10, 1984 (aged 25)
Tatiana Guderzo (ITA)	August 22, 1984 (aged 25)
Laura Lorenza Morfin Macouzet (MEX)	January 9, 1982 (aged 27)
Yevgeniya Vysotska (UKR)	December 11, 1975 (aged 34)

=== Top Girls Fassa Bortolo-Ghezzi ===
Ages as of 1 January 2010.

Rider	Date of birth
Valentina Bastianelli (ITA)	December 4, 1987 (aged 22)
Elena Berlato (ITA)	August 2, 1988 (aged 21)
Valentina Carretta (ITA)	September 16, 1989 (aged 20)
Sigrid Corneo (ITA)	April 27, 1971 (aged 38)
Serena Danesi (ITA)	January 31, 1986 (aged 23)
Alessandra D'Ettorre (ITA)	May 8, 1978 (aged 31)

Rider	Date of birth
Jennifer Fiori (ITA)	March 23, 1986 (aged 23)
Gloria Presti (ITA)	September 29, 1989 (aged 20)
Chiara Rozzini (ITA)	December 5, 1983 (aged 26)
Marta Tagliaferro (ITA)	November 4, 1989 (aged 20)
Silvia Valsecchi (ITA)	July 19, 1982 (aged 27)

=== Vaiano Solaristech ===
Ages as of 1 January 2010.

Rider	Date of birth
Irene Falorni (ITA)	January 5, 1990 (aged 19)
Simona Frapporti (ITA)	July 14, 1988 (aged 21)
Simona Martini (ITA)	April 25, 1990 (aged 19)
Alessandra Neri (ITA)	June 24, 1990 (aged 19)
Valentina Scandolara (ITA)	May 1, 1990 (aged 19)
Alena Sitsko (BLR)	December 4, 1987 (aged 22)

Rider	Date of birth
Kataržina Sosna (LTU)	November 30, 1990 (aged 19)
Eleonora Spaliviero (ITA)	September 7, 1989 (aged 20)
Francesca Tognali (ITA)	April 6, 1985 (aged 24)
Chiara Vanni (ITA)	July 21, 1989 (aged 20)
Corinna Mari (trainee) (ITA)	July 25, 1991 (aged 18)

=== Safi–Pasta Zara ===
Ages as of 1 January 2010.

Rider	Date of birth
Alyona Andruk (UKR)	June 11, 1987 (aged 22)
Inga Čilvinaitė (LTU)	February 14, 1986 (aged 23)
Lorena Foresi (ITA)	April 11, 1988 (aged 21)
Eneritz Iturriagaechevarria Mazaga (ESP)	September 17, 1980 (aged 29)
Sylwia Kapusta (POL)	December 8, 1982 (aged 27)
Oxana Kozonchuk (RUS)	May 28, 1988 (aged 21)
Leleivyte Rasa (LTU)	July 22, 1988 (aged 21)

Rider	Date of birth
Eleonora Patuzzo (ITA)	October 16, 1989 (aged 20)
Svetlana Pauliukaitė (LTU)	July 31, 1985 (aged 24)
Marina Romoli (ITA)	June 9, 1988 (aged 21)
Vilija Sereikaitė (LTU)	February 12, 1987 (aged 22)
Aušrinė Trebaitė (LTU)	October 18, 1988 (aged 21)
Olga Zabelinskaya (RUS)	May 10, 1980 (aged 29)

=== Cervélo TestTeam ===
Ages as of 1 January 2010.

Rider	Date of birth
Emilie Aubry (SUI)	February 16, 1989 (aged 20)
Charlotte Becker (GER)	May 19, 1983 (aged 26)
Regina Bruins (NED)	October 7, 1986 (aged 23)
Lieselot Decroix (BEL)	May 12, 1987 (aged 22)
Elizabeth Armitstead (GBR)	December 18, 1988 (aged 21)
Sarah Düster (GER)	July 10, 1982 (aged 27)
Sharon Laws (GBR)	July 7, 1974 (aged 35)

Rider	Date of birth
Claudia Lichtenberg (GER)	November 17, 1985 (aged 24)
Mirjam Melchers-van Poppel (NED)	September 26, 1975 (aged 34)
Emma Pooley (GBR)	October 3, 1982 (aged 27)
Carla Ryan (AUS)	September 21, 1985 (aged 24)
Patricia Schwager (SUI)	December 6, 1983 (aged 26)
Iris Slappendel (NED)	February 18, 1985 (aged 24)
Kirsten Wild (NED)	October 15, 1982 (aged 27)

=== Leontien.nl ===
Ages as of 1 January 2010.

Rider	Date of birth
Marlijn Binnendijk (NED)	May 12, 1986 (aged 23)
Chantal Blaak (NED)	October 22, 1989 (aged 20)
Andrea Bosman (NED)	August 6, 1979 (aged 30)
Lucinda Brand (NED)	July 2, 1989 (aged 20)
Anne de Wildt (NED)	October 29, 1989 (aged 20)
Monique Ree (NED)	March 2, 1988 (aged 21)

Rider	Date of birth
Irene van den Broek (NED)	August 26, 1980 (aged 29)
Heleen van Vliet (NED)	September 17, 1982 (aged 27)
Josien van Wingerden (NED)	September 22, 1987 (aged 22)
Marijn Vries (NED)	November 19, 1978 (aged 31)
Lianne Wagtho (NED)	June 5, 1985 (aged 24)

=== Nederland Bloeit ===
Ages as of 1 January 2010.

Rider	Date of birth
Liesbeth Bakker (NED)	July 6, 1986 (aged 23)
Suzanne de Goede (NED)	April 16, 1984 (aged 25)
Liesbet De Vocht (BEL)	January 5, 1979 (aged 30)
Agnieta Francke (NED)	February 7, 1990 (aged 19)
Loes Gunnewijk (NED)	November 27, 1980 (aged 29)
Janneke Kanis (NED)	February 15, 1985 (aged 24)

Rider	Date of birth
Loes Markerink (NED)	December 14, 1985 (aged 24)
Noortje Tabak (NED)	July 13, 1988 (aged 21)
Marieke van Wanroij (NED)	July 5, 1979 (aged 30)
Annemiek van Vleuten (NED)	October 8, 1982 (aged 27)
Marianne Vos (NED)	May 13, 1987 (aged 22)

=== Hitec Products UCK ===
Ages as of 1 January 2010.

Rider	Date of birth
Martine Amundsen (NOR)	September 27, 1991 (aged 18)
Lisa Brennauer (GER)	June 8, 1988 (aged 21)
Line Foss (NOR)	December 8, 1978 (aged 31)
Jacqueline Hahn (AUT)	July 21, 1991 (aged 18)
Margriet Kloppenburg (DEN)	January 18, 1988 (aged 21)
Nathalie Lamborelle (LUX)	February 1, 1988 (aged 21)
Tone Hatteland Lima (NOR)	December 18, 1979 (aged 30)
Emilie Moberg (NOR)	July 12, 1991 (aged 18)

Rider	Date of birth
Sara Mustonen Lichan (SWE)	February 8, 1981 (aged 28)
Lise Nøstvold (NOR)	February 14, 1987 (aged 22)
Maria Grandt Petersen (DEN)	June 19, 1991 (aged 18)
Kristine Saastad (NOR)	August 31, 1987 (aged 22)
Trine Schmidt (DEN)	June 3, 1988 (aged 21)
Isabelle Söderberg (SWE)	May 28, 1989 (aged 20)
Fröydis Waersted (NOR)	June 15, 1987 (aged 22)

=== MTN ===
Ages as of 1 January 2010.

Rider	Date of birth
Marissa Stander (RSA)	August 30, 1978 (aged 31)
Carla Swart (RSA)	November 26, 1987 (aged 22)
Lylanie Lauwrens (RSA)	May 25, 1984 (aged 25)
An-Li Pretorius (RSA)	August 16, 1987 (aged 22)
Robyn de Groot (RSA)	December 26, 1982 (aged 27)

Rider	Date of birth
Mariske Strauss (RSA)	May 16, 1991 (aged 18)
Cashandra Slingerland (RSA)	December 8, 1974 (aged 35)
Denni Cartwright (RSA)	December 13, 1983 (aged 26)
Cherise Taylor (RSA)	November 6, 1989 (aged 20)
Karien Van Jaarsveld (RSA)	July 8, 1981 (aged 28)

=== Fenixs–Petrogradets ===
Ages as of 1 January 2010.

Rider	Date of birth
Svetlana Stolbova (RUS)	January 2, 1973 (aged 36)
Natalia Boyarskaya (RUS)	February 27, 1983 (aged 26)
Yulia Ilinykh (RUS)	October 6, 1985 (aged 24)
Aleksandra Pyatkova (RUS)	April 14, 1991 (aged 18)
Maria Kazachenko (RUS)	March 28, 1987 (aged 22)
Irina Molicheva (RUS)	November 12, 1988 (aged 21)
Alexandra Burchenkova (RUS)	September 16, 1988 (aged 21)
Elena Novikova (RUS)	October 7, 1975 (aged 34)

Rider	Date of birth
Karin Aune (SWE)	April 29, 1975 (aged 34)
Erika Vilūnaitė (LTU)	December 25, 1980 (aged 29)
Béatrice Godart (LUX)	May 1, 1989 (aged 20)
Suzie Godart (LUX)	July 20, 1962 (aged 47)
Marta Vila Josana Andreu (ESP)	March 13, 1975 (aged 34)
Marta Bastianelli (ITA)	April 30, 1987 (aged 22)
Giuseppina Grassi Herrera (MEX)	August 29, 1976 (aged 33)

=== Alriksson Go:green ===
Ages as of 1 January 2010.

Rider	Date of birth
Henriette Christensen (DEN)	June 28, 1988 (aged 21)
Monica Holler (SWE)	May 15, 1984 (aged 25)
Jessica Kihlbom (SWE)	June 11, 1989 (aged 20)
Elin Lundberg (SWE)	December 31, 1990 (aged 19)
Johanna Nilsson (SWE)	November 21, 1990 (aged 19)

Rider	Date of birth
Madelene Olsson (SWE)	November 14, 1982 (aged 27)
Malin Rydlund (SWE)	May 3, 1977 (aged 32)
Linnea Sjöblom (SWE)	November 12, 1989 (aged 20)
Jennie Stenerhag (SWE)	June 6, 1975 (aged 34)

=== TIBCO–To The Top ===
Ages as of 1 January 2010.

Rider	Date of birth
Ruth Corset (AUS)	May 9, 1977 (aged 32)
Devon Gorry (USA)	January 3, 1981 (aged 28)
Megan Guarnier (USA)	May 4, 1985 (aged 24)
Jerika Hutchinson (USA)	August 30, 1990 (aged 19)
Joanne Kiesanowski (NZL)	May 24, 1979 (aged 30)
Kristen Lasasso (USA)	August 19, 1975 (aged 34)
Emma Mackie (AUS)	September 9, 1984 (aged 25)

Rider	Date of birth
Amanda Miller (USA)	December 13, 1986 (aged 23)
Brooke Miller (USA)	March 21, 1976 (aged 33)
Meredith Miller (USA)	December 26, 1973 (aged 36)
Rebecca Much (USA)	February 25, 1986 (aged 23)
Samantha Schneider (USA)	September 18, 1990 (aged 19)
Alison Tetrick (USA)	April 4, 1985 (aged 24)
Lia Winfield (USA)	March 7, 1986 (aged 23)

Preceded by 2009	List of UCI Women's Teams; 2010	Succeeded by 2011
