= List of 2009 UCI Women's Teams and riders =

Listed below are the UCI Women's Teams that competed in the 2009 women's road cycling events organized by the International Cycling Union (UCI) including the 2009 UCI Women's Road World Cup.

== Teams overview ==
UCI Code	Team Name	Country	Website
TUE	Uniqa–Elk	Austria	
LBL	Lotto–Belisol Ladiesteam (2009 season)	Belgium	lottoladiescycling.be
VLL	Topsport Vlaanderen–Thompson Ladies Team	Belgium	cyclingteam-vlaanderen.be
BPD	Bizkaia–Durango	Spain	duranguesa.com
DKT	Debabarrena–Kirolgi	Spain	
LTK	Lointek	Spain	equipociclistaugeraga.com
ESG	ESGL 93–GSD Gestion	France	team-esgl93.fr
FUT	Vienne Futuroscope	France	cyclisme-vienne-futuroscope.com
VOR	Vision 1 Racing	United Kingdom	vision1racing.com
RLT	Cervélo TestTeam (2009 season)	Germany	cervelo.com
NUR	Equipe Nürnberger Versicherung	Germany	equipe-nuernberger.de
TCW	Columbia–HTC (2009 season)	Germany	highroadsports.com/team
GPC	Giant Pro Cycling	Hong Kong	cycling-sports.com
FEN	Fenixs	Italy	
GAU	Gauss RDZ Ormu–Colnago	Italy	gsgauss.it
MSI	Selle Italia–Ghezzi	Italy	czdteam.it
TOG	Top Girls Fassa Bortolo Raxy Line	Italy	gstopgirls.com
MIC	S.C. Michela Fanini Record Rox	Italy	michelafanini.com
DGC	Team Cmax Dila	Italy	teamcmax.com
USC	USC Chirio Forno d'Asolo	Italy	www.chiriofornodasolo.it
SAF	Safi–Pasta Zara–Titanedi	Italy	dream-t.com
DSB	DSB Bank–LTO (2009 season)	Netherlands	dsbcyclingteam.nl
LNL	Leontien.nl	Netherlands	leontien.nl
RSC	Red Sun Cycling Team	Netherlands	red-suncycling.nl
FLX	Team Flexpoint	Netherlands	teamflexpoint.com
HPU	Team Hitec Products UCK	Norway	hitecproducts-uck.no
MTW	MTN	South Africa	ryder.co.za
PTG	Petrogradets	Russia	petrogradets.ru
BCT	Bigla Cycling Team	Switzerland	biglacyclingteam.ch

== Riders ==
=== Lotto–Belisol Ladiesteam ===
- Lizzie Armitstead
- Evelyn Arys
- Sofie De Vuyst
- Catherine Delfosse
- Elise Depoorter
- Rochelle Gilmore
- Vera Koedooder
- Lien Lanssens
- Emma Mac Kie
- Kim Schoonbaert
- Emma Silversides
- Linn Torp
- Annelies van Doorslaer
- Grace Verbeke

=== Vision 1 Racing ===
Ages as of 1 January 2009.

Rider	Date of birth
Nicole Cooke (GBR)	April 13, 1983 (aged 25)
Katie Curtis (GBR)	November 1, 1988 (aged 20)
Gabriella Day (Note: Day left the team on 31 May.) (GBR)	December 1, 1984 (aged 24)
Christel Ferrier-Bruneau (FRA)	July 8, 1979 (aged 29)
Jacqueline Garner (Note: Garner joined the team on 1 June.) (GBR)	October 31, 1989 (aged 19)

Rider	Date of birth
Dani King (GBR)	November 21, 1990 (aged 18)
Debby van de Berg (NED)	August 23, 1980 (aged 28)
Aurore Verhoeven (FRA)	January 15, 1990 (aged 18)
Vicki Whitelaw (AUS)	January 2, 1977 (aged 31)
Helen Wyman (Note: Wyman left the team on 31 May.) (GBR)	March 4, 1981 (aged 27)

=== Cervélo TestTeam ===
- Katharina Alberti
- Kristin Armstrong
- Emilie Aubry
- Regina Bruins
- Lieselot Decroix
- Sandra Dietel
- Sarah Düster
- Claudia Lichtenberg
- Emma Pooley
- Carla Ryan
- Pascale Schnider
- Patricia Schwager
- Christiane Soeder
- Élodie Touffet
- Kirsten Wild

=== Team Columbia–High Road Women ===
Ages as of 1 January 2009.

Rider	Date of birth
Mara Abbott (USA)	November 14, 1985 (aged 23)
Kim Anderson (USA)	January 28, 1968 (aged 40)
Judith Arndt (GER)	July 23, 1976 (aged 32)
Kate Bates (AUS)	May 18, 1982 (aged 26)
Chantal Beltman (NED)	August 26, 1976 (aged 32)
Ellen van Dijk (NED)	February 11, 1987 (aged 21)

Rider	Date of birth
Emilia Fahlin (SWE)	October 24, 1988 (aged 20)
Luise Keller (GER)	March 8, 1984 (aged 24)
Maria Mendel (GER)	September 30, 1987 (aged 21)
Ina-Yoko Teutenberg (GER)	October 28, 1974 (aged 34)
Linda Villumsen Serup (DEN)	April 9, 1985 (aged 23)
Alexandra Wrubleski (CAN)	May 31, 1984 (aged 24)

=== Selle Italia–Ghezzi ===
Ages as of 1 January 2009.

Rider	Date of birth
Agne Bagdonaviciute (LTU)	June 4, 1985 (aged 23)
Giada Borgato (ITA)	June 15, 1989 (aged 19)
Laura Bozzolo (ITA)	September 28, 1985 (aged 23)
Kaytee Boyd (NZL)	February 8, 1978 (aged 30)
Martine Bras (NED)	May 17, 1978 (aged 30)
Sigrid Corneo (ITA)	April 27, 1971 (aged 37)
Lorena Foresi (ITA)	April 11, 1988 (aged 20)

Rider	Date of birth
Oxana Kozonchuk (RUS)	May 28, 1988 (aged 20)
Fabiana Luperini (ITA)	January 14, 1974 (aged 34)
Gloria Presti (ITA)	September 29, 1989 (aged 19)
Luisa Tamanini (ITA)	January 31, 1980 (aged 28)
Sabrina Zogli (ITA)	March 21, 1986 (aged 22)
Silvia Valsecchi (ITA)	July 19, 1982 (aged 26)
Giuseppina Grassi Herrera (MEX)	August 29, 1976 (aged 32)

=== Team Cmax Dilà ===
Ages as of 1 January 2009.

Rider	Date of birth
Saneila Biagi (ITA)	September 19, 1988 (aged 20)
Francesca Faustini (ITA)	December 27, 1988 (aged 20)
Kettj Manfrin (ITA)	May 6, 1981 (aged 27)
Alessia Massaccesi (ITA)	February 5, 1989 (aged 19)
Silvia Tirado Marquez (ESP)	July 27, 1986 (aged 22)

Rider	Date of birth
Arien Torsius (RSA)	April 3, 1987 (aged 21)
Marta Vila Josana Andreu (ESP)	March 13, 1975 (aged 33)
Chiara Vanni (ITA)	July 21, 1989 (aged 19)
Alessia Quarta (ITA)	June 23, 1976 (aged 32)

=== USC Chirio Forno d'Asolo ===
- Silvia Borile (ITA)
- Marina Chirio (ITA)
- Clemilda Fernandes (BRA)
- Janildes Fernandes (BRA)
- Márcia Fernandes (BRA)
- Uênia Fernandes (BRA)
- Simona Frapporti (ITA)
- Edita Janeliūnaitė (LTU)
- Christina Kollman (AUT)
- Adriana Lovera (VEN)
- Karelia Machado (VEN)
- Laura Marotta (ITA)
- Martina Nota (ITA)
- Jolanta Polikevičiūtė (LTU)
- Eleonora Spaliviero (ITA)
- Daiva Tušlaitė (LTU)
- Edita Ungurytė (LTU)
- Eglė Zablockytė (LTU)

=== DSB Bank–LTO ===
- Lizzie Armitstead
- Evelyn Arys
- Sofie De Vuyst
- Catherine Delfosse
- Elise Depoorter
- Rochelle Gilmore
- Vera Koedooder
- Lien Lanssens
- Emma Mac Kie
- Kim Schoonbaert
- Emma Silversides
- Linn Torp
- Annelies van Doorslaer
- Grace Verbeke

=== Red Sun Cycling Team ===
- (Netherlands) Anne Arnouts
- (Belgium) Latoya Brulee
- (Poland) Paulina Brzeźna
- (Netherlands) Petra Dijkman
- (Belgium) Maxime Groenewegen
- (Netherlands) Elise van Hage
- (Belgium) Ludivine Henrion
- (Sweden) Emma Johansson
- (Netherlands) Inge Klep
- (Netherlands) Daniëlla Moonen
- (Netherlands) Mascha Pijnenborg
- (Netherlands) Moniek Rotmensen
- (Belgium) Laure Werner

=== Team Flexpoint ===
Ages as of 1 January 2009.

Rider	Date of birth
Trine Schmidt (DEN)	June 3, 1988 (aged 20)
Mirjam Melchers-van Poppel (NED)	September 26, 1975 (aged 33)
Jacobien Kanis (NED)	April 23, 1989 (aged 19)
Saskia Elemans (NED)	March 11, 1977 (aged 31)
Susanne Ljungskog (SWE)	March 16, 1976 (aged 32)

Rider	Date of birth
Anna van der Breggen (NED)	April 18, 1990 (aged 18)
Iris Slappendel (NED)	February 18, 1985 (aged 23)
Loes Markerink (NED)	December 14, 1985 (aged 23)
Loes Gunnewijk (NED)	November 27, 1980 (aged 28)
Nikki Harris (GBR)	December 30, 1986 (aged 22)

=== Petrogradets ===
Ages as of 1 January 2009.

Rider	Date of birth
Yulia Popova (RUS)	January 31, 1989 (aged 19)
Alexandra Burchenkova (RUS)	September 16, 1988 (aged 20)
Irina Bezrebraya (RUS)	December 4, 1969 (aged 39)
Elena Novikova (RUS)	October 7, 1975 (aged 33)

Rider	Date of birth
Mariya Slokotovich (KAZ)	January 16, 1989 (aged 19)
Yulia Ilinykh (RUS)	October 6, 1985 (aged 23)
Maria Kazachenko (RUS)	March 28, 1987 (aged 21)
Irina Molicheva (RUS)	November 12, 1988 (aged 20)

=== Bigla Cycling Team ===
Ages as of 1 January 2009.

Rider	Date of birth
Nicole Brändli (SUI)	June 18, 1979 (aged 29)
Andrea Graus (AUT)	November 13, 1979 (aged 29)
Noemi Cantele (ITA)	July 17, 1981 (aged 27)
Karin Thürig (SUI)	July 4, 1972 (aged 36)
Bettina Kühn (SUI)	August 7, 1982 (aged 26)
Monica Holler (SWE)	May 15, 1984 (aged 24)

Rider	Date of birth
Jennifer Hohl (SUI)	February 3, 1986 (aged 22)
Veronica Andrèasson (SWE)	March 6, 1981 (aged 27)
Modesta Vžesniauskaitė (LTU)	October 17, 1983 (aged 25)
Marion Bernet (SUI)	September 20, 1988 (aged 20)
Helen Blatter (SUI)	April 14, 1989 (aged 19)
Jessica Uebelhart (SUI)	October 16, 1990 (aged 18)

Preceded by 2008	List of UCI Women's Teams; 2009	Succeeded by 2010
