= 2009 UCI Women's Road World Rankings =

The 2009 UCI Women's Road Rankings is an overview of the UCI Women's Road Rankings, based upon the results in all UCI-sanctioned races of the 2009 women's road cycling season.

== Summary ==
Final result.

Top-ranked individual	Second-ranked individual	Third-ranked individual	Top-ranked team	Top-ranked nation
Marianne Vos (NED); DSB Bank–LTO	Kirsten Wild (NED); Cervelo Test Team	Emma Johansson (SWE); Red Sun Cycling Team	Cervelo Test Team	Netherlands

== Individual World Ranking (top 100) ==
Final result.

	Cyclists	Nation	Team	Age	Points
1	Marianne Vos	Netherlands	DSB	22	1,360.55
2	Kirsten Wild	Netherlands	CWT	27	848
3	Emma Johansson	Sweden	RSC	26	796.75
4	Kristin Armstrong	United States	CWT	36	584.7
5	Ina Teutenberg	Germany	TCW	35	582.45
6	Noemi Cantele	Italy	BCT	28	509
7	Trixi Worrack	Germany	NUR	28	492.55
8	Rochelle Gilmore	Australia	LBL	28	485
9	Emma Pooley	Great Britain	CWT	27	460.7
10	Judith Arndt	Germany	TCW	33	431.25
11	Claudia Häusler	Germany	CWT	24	427.7
12	Diana Žiliūtė	Lithuania	SAF	33	414
13	Grace Verbeke	Belgium	LBL	25	386
14	Nicole Cooke	Great Britain	VOR	26	384
15	Linda Villumsen	Denmark	TCW	24	365.2
16	Chloe Hosking	Australia		19	316
17	Tatiana Guderzo	Italy	MIC	25	296
18	Giorgia Bronzini	Italy	SAF	26	287
19	Christiane Soeder	Austria	CWT	34	263
20	Ruth Corset	Australia		32	246
21	Jeannie Longo-Ciprelli	France		51	244
22	Loes Gunnewijk	Netherlands	FLX	29	236
23	Susanne Ljungskog	Sweden	FLX	33	233
24	Chantal Blaak	Netherlands	LNL	20	230
25	Svetlana Bubnenkova	Russia	FEN	36	225
26	Amber Neben	United States	NUR	34	221.3
27	Suzanne de Goede	Netherlands	NUR	25	215
28	Nicole Brändli	Switzerland	BCT	30	215
29	Mara Abbott	United States	TCW	24	202
30	Sarah Düster	Germany	CWT	27	181
31	Charlotte Becker	Germany	NUR	26	179.8
32	Regina Bruins	Netherlands	CWT	23	177.7
33	Bridie O'Donnell	Australia		35	177
34	Carla Ryan	Australia	CWT	24	170
35	Monia Baccaille	Italy	MIC	25	166
36	Andrea Bosman	Netherlands	LNL	30	158
37	Martine Bras	Netherlands	MSI	31	157.25
38	Kimberly Anderson	United States	TCW	41	152.5
39	Yuliya Martisova	Russia	GAU	33	143.19
40	Edita Pučinskaitė	Lithuania	GAU	34	137.5
41	Fabiana Luperini	Italy	MSI	35	133
42	Alexandra Burchenkova	Russia	PTG	21	132
43	Sara Mustonen	Sweden	HPU	28	125
44	Edwige Pitel	France		42	110
45	Erinne Willock	Canada		28	110
46	Eva Lutz	Germany	NUR	30	101.8
47	Marlen Johrend	Germany	NUR	23	101.75
48	Liesbet De Vocht	Belgium	DSB	30	101.55
49	Joëlle Numainville	Canada	ESG	22	101
50	Cashandra Slingerland	South Africa	MTW	35	99
51	Evelyn Stevens	United States		26	99
52	Ellen van Dijk	Netherlands	TCW	22	96.75
53	Tara Whitten	Canada		29	96
54	Julia Shaw	Great Britain		44	96
55	Trine Schmidt	Denmark	FLX	21	93
56	Kirsty Broun	Australia		30	93
57	Regina Schleicher	Germany	NUR	35	92.75
58	Elizabeth Armitstead	Great Britain	LBL	21	90
59	Catherine Cheatley	New Zealand		26	90
60	Rasa Leleivytė	Lithuania	SAF	21	88
61	Iris Slappendel	Netherlands	FLX	24	85.5
62	Luisa Tamanini	Italy	MSI	29	83.25
63	Vicki Whitelaw	Australia	VOR	32	83
64	Monica Holler	Sweden	BCT	25	83
65	Wendy Houvenaghel	Great Britain		35	80
66	Kerong Tang	China		21	72
67	Amber Halliday	Australia		30	70
68	Denise Zuckermandel	Germany		21	68
69	Alexis Rhodes	Australia		25	67
70	Marissa van der Merwe	South Africa	MTW	31	67
71	Marie Lindberg	Sweden	NUR	22	66.75
72	Karin Thürig	Switzerland	BCT	37	66
73	Katie Colclough	Great Britain		19	66
74	Svitlana Halyuk	Ukraine		22	63
75	Jennie Stenerhag	Sweden		34	60.25
76	Lisa Brennauer	Germany	NUR	21	59.75
77	Modesta Vžesniauskaitė	Lithuania	BCT	26	58
78	Ludivine Henrion	Belgium	RSC	25	56.75
79	Paola Muñoz	Chile		23	56
80	Tania Belvederesi	Italy	GAU	31	55.2
81	Emilia Fahlin	Sweden	TCW	21	54.25
82	Chantal Beltman	Netherlands	TCW	33	53.2
83	Mirjam Melchers-Van Poppel	Netherlands	FLX	34	53
84	Lauren Franges	United States		26	52
85	Na Zhao	China	GPC	25	52
86	Kelly Druyts	Belgium	VLL	20	50
87	Petra Dijkman	Netherlands	RSC	30	49.5
88	Madeleine Sandig	Germany	NUR	26	47.55
89	Gao Min	China	GPC	27	47
90	Elena Novikova	Russia	PTG	34	47
91	Alessandra D'Ettorre	Italy	TOG	31	46.5
92	Jennifer Hohl	Switzerland	BCT	23	46
93	Tiffany Cromwell	Australia		21	46
94	Karine Gautard	France	FUT	25	45.75
95	Adrie Visser	Netherlands	DSB	26	45
96	Yulia Iliynikh	Russia	PTG	24	43
97	Sophie Creux	France	ESG	28	43
98	Lesya Kalytovska	Ukraine		21	42
99	Gina Grain	Canada		35	41
100	Sigrid Corneo	Slovenia	MSI	38	40

== UCI Teams Ranking ==
This is the ranking of the UCI women's teams from 2009.
Final result.

	Team	Nation	Points
1	Cervelo Test Team	Germany	2,321.10
2	Team Columbia–High Road Women	Germany	1,580.90
3	DSB Bank–LTO	Netherlands	1,528.35
4	Equipe Nürnberger Versicherung	Germany	1,108.65
5	Lotto–Belisol Ladiesteam	Belgium	990
6	Red Sun Cycling Team	Netherlands	923.75
7	Bigla Cycling Team	Switzerland	873
8	Safi	Lithuania	826
9	Team Flexpoint	Netherlands	647.5
10	Vision 1 Racing	Great Britain	504
11	S.C. Michela Fanini Record Rox	Italy	485
12	Leontien.nl	Netherlands	424.5
13	Selle Italia–Ghezzi	Italy	413.5
14	Gauss RDZ Ormu–Colnago	Italy	371.09
15	Fenixs	Italy	290.25
16	Petrogradets	Russia	227
17	ESGL 93–GSD Gestion	France	194
18	MTN	South Africa	187
19	Team Hitec Products UCK	Norway	150
20	Giant Pro Cycling	Hong Kong, China	149
21	Vienne Futuroscope	France	129.75
22	Team Uniqa-Elk	Austria	75
23	Top Girls Fassa Bortolo Raxy Line	Italy	74
24	Topsport Vlaanderen Thompson Ladies Team	Belgium	69
25	USC Chirio Forno D'Asolo	Italy	63
26	Lointek	Spain	22
27	Team Cmax Dila'	Italy	18
28	Bizkaia	Spain	10.25

== Nations Ranking ==
Final result.

	Nation	Code	Points
1	Netherlands	NED	2,889.55
2	Germany	GER	2,114.95
3	Australia	AUS	1,394
4	Italy	ITA	1,391
5	Sweden	SWE	1,304.50
6	United States	USA	1,259.50
7	Great Britain	GBR	1,110.70
8	Lithuania	LTU	713.5
9	Belgium	BEL	608.3
10	Russia	RUS	590.19
11	France	FRA	476.75
12	Denmark	DEN	458.2
13	Switzerland	SUI	383
14	Canada	CAN	370
15	Austria	AUT	273
16	China	CHN	229
17	South Africa	RSA	199
18	Ukraine	UKR	175
19	New Zealand	NZL	169
20	Mexico	MEX	91
21	Morocco	MAR	81
22	Spain	ESP	73
23	Kazakhstan	KAZ	59
24	Czech Republic	CZE	56
24	Luxembourg	LUX	56
24	Chile	CHI	56
27	Poland	POL	55.75
28	Slovenia	SLO	55
29	Brazil	BRA	54
30	Chinese Taipei	TPE	43
31	Thailand	THA	41
32	Belarus	BLR	40
32	Japan	JPN	40
34	Mauritius	MRI	38
35	Finland	FIN	33
36	Serbia	SRB	30
36	Greece	GRE	30
36	Israel	ISR	30
36	Hungary	HUN	30
40	Norway	NOR	29.75
41	North Korea	PRK	27
41	Croatia	CRO	27
41	Mongolia	MGL	27
44	Malaysia	MAS	25
44	Estonia	EST	25
44	St. Kitts & Nevis	SKN	25
44	Romania	ROU	25
48	Ireland	IRL	20
49	Guyana	GUY	17
50	Colombia	COL	13

== See also ==
- 2008–09 UCI Track Cycling World Ranking
- 2009–10 UCI Track Cycling World Ranking

Preceded by 2008	UCI Women's Road Rankings; 2009	Succeeded by 2010
