= List of rosters for Lotto–Belisol Ladiesteam and its successors =

This page lists the rosters, by season, of the UCI Women's Team, Lotto–Soudal Ladies.

== 2012 ==
Ages as of 1 January 2012.

| Rider | Date of birth |
|---|---|
| Bo Carless (BEL) | July 23, 1993 (aged 19) |
| Robyn De Groot (RSA) | December 26, 1982 (aged 30) |
| Sofie De Vuyst (BEL) | April 2, 1987 (aged 25) |
| Ann-Sophie Duyck (BEL) | July 23, 1987 (aged 25) |
| Joline Goossens (BEL) | June 18, 1985 (aged 27) |
| Kaat Hannes (BEL) | November 21, 1991 (aged 21) |
| Ludivine Henrion (BEL) | January 23, 1984 (aged 28) |
| An-Li Kachelhoffer (RSA) | August 16, 1987 (aged 25) |

| Rider | Date of birth |
|---|---|
| Ashleigh Moolman-Pasio (RSA) | December 9, 1985 (aged 27) |
| Lise Olivier (RSA) | May 30, 1983 (aged 29) |
| Kim Schoonbaert (BEL) | March 2, 1986 (aged 26) |
| Cherise Taylor (RSA) | November 6, 1989 (aged 23) |
| Joanna Van De Winkel (RSA) | April 22, 1982 (aged 30) |
| Katrien Van Looy (BEL) | June 19, 1989 (aged 23) |
| Nathalie Nijns (Cyclo-cross specialist) (BEL) | July 1, 1993 (aged 19) |

== 2011 ==
Ages as of 1 January 2011.

| Rider | Date of birth |
|---|---|
| Veronica Andrèasson (SWE) | March 6, 1981 (aged 29) |
| Robyn de Groot (RSA) | December 26, 1982 (aged 28) |
| Sofie De Vuyst (BEL) | April 2, 1987 (aged 23) |
| Catherine Delfosse (BEL) | June 11, 1981 (aged 29) |
| Elise Depoorter (BEL) | February 9, 1988 (aged 22) |
| Rochelle Gilmore (AUS) | December 14, 1981 (aged 29) |
| Joline Goossens (BEL) | June 18, 1985 (aged 25) |
| Ludivine Henrion (BEL) | January 23, 1984 (aged 26) |
| Ashleigh Moolman-Pasio (RSA) | December 9, 1985 (aged 25) |

| Rider | Date of birth |
|---|---|
| Kim Schoonbaert (BEL) | March 2, 1986 (aged 24) |
| Marissa Stander (RSA) | August 30, 1978 (aged 32) |
| Cherise Taylor (RSA) | November 6, 1989 (aged 21) |
| Joanna van de Winkel (RSA) | April 22, 1982 (aged 28) |
| Laure Werner (BEL) | February 22, 1981 (aged 29) |
| Vicki Whitelaw (AUS) | January 2, 1977 (aged 33) |
| Melissa Hoskins (AUS) | February 24, 1991 (aged 19) |
| Josephine Tomic (AUS) | June 9, 1989 (aged 21) |

== 2010 ==
Ages as of 1 January 2010.

| Rider | Date of birth |
|---|---|
| Veronica Andreasson (SWE) | March 6, 1981 (aged 28) |
| Tiffany Cromwell (AUS) | July 6, 1988 (aged 21) |
| Sofie De Vuyst (BEL) | April 2, 1987 (aged 22) |
| Catherine Delfosse (BEL) | June 11, 1981 (aged 28) |
| Elise Depoorter (BEL) | February 9, 1988 (aged 21) |
| Rochelle Gilmore (AUS) | December 14, 1981 (aged 28) |
| Elizabeth Hatch (USA) | June 3, 1980 (aged 29) |
| Lien Lanssens (BEL) | February 1, 1989 (aged 20) |

| Rider | Date of birth |
|---|---|
| Ashleigh Moolman-Pasio (RSA) | December 9, 1985 (aged 24) |
| Lizanne Naude (RSA) | January 17, 1984 (aged 25) |
| Kim Schoonbaert (BEL) | March 2, 1986 (aged 23) |
| Nimesha Smith (NZL) | March 17, 1977 (aged 32) |
| Josephine Tomic (AUS) | June 9, 1989 (aged 20) |
| Annelies Van Doorslaer (BEL) | January 15, 1989 (aged 20) |
| Grace Verbeke (BEL) | November 12, 1984 (aged 25) |
| Vicki Whitelaw (AUS) | January 2, 1977 (aged 32) |

== 2007 ==
- Kim Schoonbaert (BEL)
- Elise Depoorter (BEL)
- Liesbet De Vocht (BEL)
- Catherine Delfosse (BEL) (in from Team Massi Abarth (MTB))
- Lieselot Decroix (BEL) (in from Velo Bella)
- Martine Bras (NED) (in from Moving Ladies)
- Corine Hierckens (BEL) (in from AA Drink)
- Grace Verbeken (BEL)
- Sara Carrigan (AUS)
- Siobhan Dervan (IRL)
- Tamara Boyd (NZL) (in from Les Pruneaux d'Agen)
- Yolandi Du Toit (RSA) (in from Team FBUK)
- Kathy Watt (AUS)
- Sofie De Vuyst (BEL)
- Jurrina Duprez (BEL)
- Annelies Van Doorslaer (BEL)
- Laura Van Geyt (BEL)
- Nana Steenssens (NED)
- Ine Beyen (BEL)
- Lien Beyen (BEL)
- Denise D'Hamecourt (BEL)
- Jenifer De Merlier (BEL)
- Kelly Druyts (BEL)
- Evi Verstraete (BEL)
- Lien Lanssens (BEL)
- Arien Torsius (RSA)
- Natalia Llaca (MEX)

== 2006 ==
- (France) Marielle Aunave
- (Australia) Claire Baxter
- (Belgium) Liesbet De Vocht
- (Belgium) Sofie De Vuyst
- (Belgium) Ludivine Henrion
- (Republic of Ireland) Siobhan Horgan
- (Belgium) Myriam Jacotey
- (Netherlands) Christa Pirard
- (Belgium) Kim Schoonbaert
- (Belgium) Inge Van Den Broeck
- (Belgium) An Van Rie
- (United States) Christine Verdaros
- (Belgium) Grace Verbeke
- (Australia) Kathryn Watt
