= 2009 European Road Championships – Women's under-23 road race =

Women's U23 Road Race
2009 European Road Championships
- UEC European Champion jersey

Race details
- Dates: 4 July 2009
- Stages: 1
- Distance: 135.3 km (84.07 mi)
- Winning time: 3h 38' 32"

Results
	Winner	Chantal Blaak (Netherlands)
	Second	Katie Colclough (Great Britain)
	Third	Marianne Vos (Netherlands)

The Women's U23 Individual road race at the 2009 European Road Championships took place in Hooglede, Belgium on 4 July over a course of 135.3 km.

== Final classification ==
Rank	Rider	Time
1st place, gold medalist(s)	Chantal Blaak (NED)	3h 38m 32s
2nd place, silver medalist(s)	Katie Colclough (GBR)	+ 58 s
3rd place, bronze medalist(s)	Marianne Vos (NED)	+ 1m 03s
4	Rasa Leleivytė (LTU)	+ 1m 15s
5	Denise Zuckermandel (GER)	"
6	Pascale Jeuland (FRA)	"
7	Alena Amialysik (BLR)	"
8	Nathalie Lamborelle (LUX)	"
9	Kelly Druyts (BEL)	"
10	Marina Romoli (ITA)	"
11	Emilia Fahlin (SWE)	"
12	Jessica Schneeberger (SUI)	"
13	Emilie Aubry (SUI)	"
14	Lesya Kalytovska (UKR)	"
15	Noortje Tabak (NED)	"
16	Lorena Foresi (ITA)	"
17	Giada Borgato (ITA)	"
18	Aleksandra Dawidowicz (POL)	"
19	Latoya Brulee (BEL)	"
20	Svitlana Halyuk (UKR)	"
21	Ine Beyen (BEL)	"
22	Martina Zwick (GER)	"
23	Edita Janeliūnaitė (LTU)	"
24	Ellen van Dijk (NED)	"
25	Anne Arnouts (BEL)	"
26	Annelies Van Doorslaer (BEL)	"
27	Semra Yetiş (TUR)	"
28	Lucinda Brand (NED)	"
29	Marie Lindberg (SWE)	"
30	Oxana Kozonchuk (RUS)	"
31	Valentina Scandolara (ITA)	"
32	Amelie Rivat (FRA)	+ 1m 22s
33	Melanie Bravard (FRA)	"
34	Victoria Kondel (RUS)	"
35	Valeriya Kononenko (UKR)	"
36	Annie Last (GBR)	"
37	Christine Majerus (LUX)	"
38	Isabelle Söderberg (SWE)	"
39	Lisa Brennauer (GER)	"
40	Alexandra Burchenkova (RUS)	"
41	Romy Kasper (GER)	+ 1m 27s
42	Audrey Cordon (FRA)	+ 1m 32s
43	Franziska Merten (GER)	+ 2m 45s
44	Irina Molicheva (RUS)	+ 2m 49s
45	Hanna Amend (GER)	+ 5m 30s
46	Monique Van De Ree (NED)	"
47	Kristine Saastad (NOR)	"
48	Ane Santesteban Gonzalez (ESP)	"
49	Lien Lanssens (BEL)	"
50	Ekaterina Novozhilova (RUS)	"
51	Kirsti Ruud (NOR)	"
52	Cecilie Saeteroy Johansen (NOR)	"
53	Anna Potokina (NOR)	"
54	Sofie De Vuyst (BEL)	"
55	Emilie Blanquefort (FRA)	"
56	Anne-Marie Schmitt (LUX)	"
57	Eleonora Suelotto (ITA)	+ 7m 55sec
