= 2009 DSB Bank–LTO season =

2009 DSB Bank–LTO
- UCI Team ranking: 3rd

Season victories
- One-day races: 6
- Stage race overall: 2
- Stage race stages: 4
- Best ranked rider: Marianne Vos (1st)

The 2009 season was the fifth for the DSB Bank–LTO cycling team, which started as DSB Bank in 2005.

== Roster ==
- (Netherlands) Liesbeth Bakker
- (Netherlands) Janneke Busser
- (Belgium) Liesbet De Vocht
- (Netherlands) Agnieta Francke
- (Germany) Elke Gebhardt
- (Netherlands) Josephine Groeneveld
- (Germany) Angela Hennig
- (Netherlands) Yvonne Hijgenaar
- (Germany) Tina Liebig
- (Netherlands) Bertine Spijkerman
- (Netherlands) Noortje Tabak
- (Netherlands) Marieke van Wanroij
- (Netherlands) Annemiek van Vleuten
- (Netherlands) Daisy van der Aa
- (Netherlands) Adrie Visser
- (Netherlands) Marianne Vos

== Season victories ==
Single day and stage races 2009
Date	Nation	Race	Cat.	Winner
	Italy	Trofeo Alfredo Binda		Marianne Vos
	Netherlands	Novilon Eurocup Ronde van Drenthe		Marianne Vos
	Belgium	La Flèche Wallonne Féminine		Marianne Vos
	Czech Republic	Stage 1 Gracia–Orlová		Marianne Vos
	France	Stage 4 & 7 Tour de l'Aude Cycliste Féminin		Marianne Vos
	Netherlands	7-Dorpenomloop Aalburg		Marianne Vos
	France	Stage 4 Grande Boucle feminine		Marianne Vos
	Great Britain	Overall Women's Tour of Britain		Liesbet De Vocht
	Great Britain	Stage 1 Women's Tour of Britain		Liesbet De Vocht
	Great Britain	Stage 2 Women's Tour of Britain		Janneke Kanis
	Great Britain	Stage 3, 4a & 4b Women's Tour of Britain		Marianne Vos
	Sweden	Open de Suède Vårgårda	CDM	Marianne Vos
	Netherlands	Draai van de Kaai	1.NED	Marianne Vos
	Netherlands	Ronde van Maastricht	1.NED	Marianne Vos
	Netherlands	Profronde van Oostvoorne	1.NED	Marianne Vos
	Netherlands	Holland Ladies Tour		Marianne Vos
	France	Stage 4 & 5 Tour Cycliste Féminin International Ardèche		Angela Brodtka-Hennig
	Italy	Stage 4 & 6 Giro della Toscana Femminile		Marianne Vos

National, Continental and World champions 2009
Date	Discipline	Jersey	Winner
	Cyclo-cross World Champion		Marianne Vos
27 June	Dutch National Road Race Championships		Marianne Vos

== Results in major races ==
=== Women's World Cup 2009 ===
Marianne Vos finished 1st in the individual and the team finished 2nd in the teams overall standing.

Results at the World Cup races
Date	#	Race	Best rider	Place
29 March	1	Trofeo Alfredo Binda-Comune di Cittiglio	(Netherlands) Marianne Vos	1st
5 April	2	Tour of Flanders for Women	(Netherlands) Marianne Vos	6th
13 April	3	Ronde van Drenthe	(Netherlands) Marianne Vos	8th
22 April	4	La Flèche Wallonne Féminine	(Netherlands) Marianne Vos	1st
10 May	5	Tour de Berne	(Netherlands) Marianne Vos	2nd
30 May	6	Coupe du Monde Cycliste Féminine de Montréal		
31 July	7	Open de Suède Vårgårda TTT	DSB Bank–LTO	5th
2 August	8	Open de Suède Vårgårda	(Netherlands) Marianne Vos	1st
22 August	9	Grand Prix de Plouay	(Netherlands) Marianne Vos	2nd
13 September	10	Rund um die Nürnberger Altstadt	(Netherlands) Marianne Vos	6th
Final individual classification			(Netherlands) Marianne Vos	1st
Final team classification			DSB Bank–LTO	2nd

Other major single day races
Date	Race	Rider	Place
1 July	European Road Championships – Time Trial (Note: Riders are part of the national team)	Marianne Vos (NED)	3rd place, bronze medalist(s)
4 July	European Road Championships – Road Race (Note: Riders are part of the national team)	Marianne Vos (NED)	3rd place, bronze medalist(s)
24 September	UCI Road World Championships – Women's road race (Note: Riders are part of the national team)	Marianne Vos (NED)	2nd place, silver medalist(s)

== UCI World Ranking ==
The team finished 3rd in the UCI ranking for teams.

Individual UCI World Ranking
Rank	Rider	Points
1	(Netherlands) Marianne Vos	1360.55
48	(Belgium) Liesbet De Vocht	101.55
95	(United Kingdom) Adrie Visser	45
