= 2009 Cervélo TestTeam (women) season =

2009 Cervélo TestTeam
- UCI Team ranking: 1st

Season victories
- One-day races
- Stage race overall
- Best ranked rider: Kirsten Wild (2nd)

The 2009 season was the fifth for the Cervélo TestTeam Women (UCI code: CWT), which started in 2005 as the Univega Pro Cycling Team.

== Roster ==
- Katharina Alberti
- Kristin Armstrong
- Emilie Aubry
- Regina Bruins
- Lieselot Decroix
- Sandra Dietel
- Sarah Düster
- Claudia Lichtenberg
- Emma Pooley
- Carla Ryan
- Pascale Schnider
- Patricia Schwager
- Christiane Soeder
- Élodie Touffet
- Kirsten Wild

== Season victories ==
Single day and stage races 2009
Date	Nation	Race	Cat.	Winner
		Overall Ladies Tour of Qatar		Kirsten Wild
		GP Costa Etrusca		Emma Pooley
		Giro dei Comuni Ribardella-Montescudaio		Sarah Düster
		Grand Prix de Dottignies		Sarah Düster
		Omloop van Borsele		Kirsten Wild
		GP Stad Roeselare		Kirsten Wild
		Grand Prix de Suisse		Chrisitane Soeder
		Berner-Rundfahrt- WE		Kristin Armstrong
		Overall Tour de l'Aude Cycliste Féminin		Claudia Häusler
		Stage 5 Tour de l'Aude Cycliste Féminin		Kristin Armstrong
		Coupe du Monde Cycliste Féminine de Montréal		Emma Pooley
		Overall Tour du Grand Montréal		Kirsten Wild
		Stages 1, 2 & 4 Tour du Grand Montréal		Kirsten Wild
		Stage 3 Tour du Grand Montréal		Regina Bruins
		Overall Tour Cycliste féminin		Emma Pooley
		Stages 1 & 3 Tour Cycliste féminin		Emma Pooley
		Stage 2 Tour Cycliste féminin		Christiane Soeder
		Overall Giro d'Italia Femminile		Claudia Häusler
		Prologue & Stage 9 Giro d'Italia Femminile		Kirsten Wild
		Stage 7 Giro d'Italia Femminile		Claudia Häusler
		Stage 4 International Thüringen Rundfahrt der Frauen		Christiane Soeder
		GP de Plouay		Emma Pooley
		Stages 1, 3 & 4 BrainWash Ladies Tour		Kirsten Wild
		Rund um die Nürnberger Altstadt – WE		Kirsten Wild
		Overall Tour Cycliste Féminin International Ardèche		Kristin Armstrong
		Stages 1 & 2 Tour Cycliste Féminin International Ardèche		Christiane Soeder
		Stage 3 Tour Cycliste Féminin International Ardèche		Kristin Armstrong
		2009 UCI Women's Road World Cup, Team standings Champion		Cervélo TestTeam

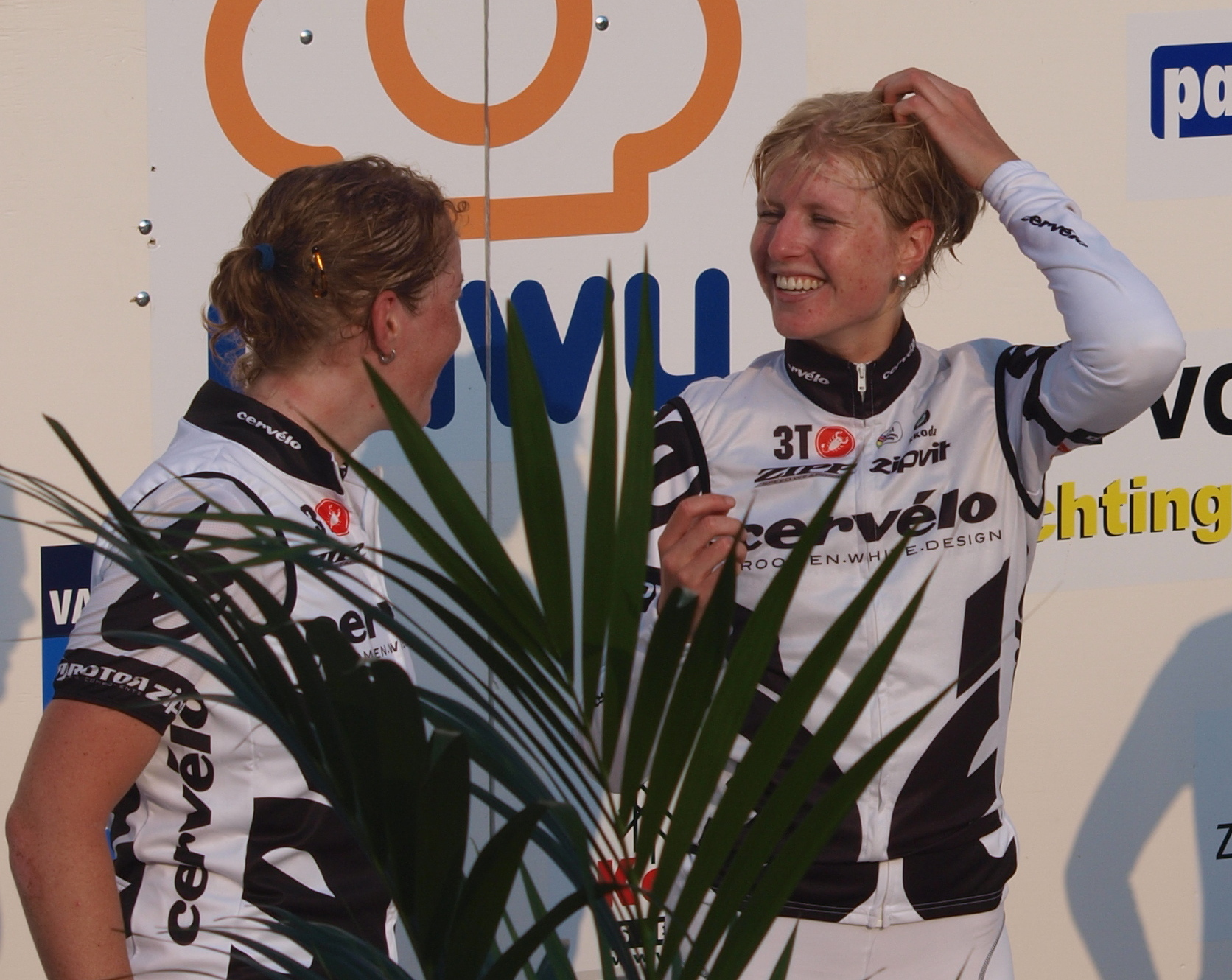
Regina Bruins and Kirsten Wild finished 1st and 2nd at the Dutch Time Trial Championship

National, Continental and World champions 2009
Date	Discipline	Jersey	Winner
	Australian Time Trial Championship		Carla Ryan
	Australian Road Race Championship		Carla Ryan
	Austrian Road Race Championships		Christiane Soeder
27 August	Dutch Time Trial Championship		Regina Bruins
	British Time Trial Championship		Emma Pooley
	Austrian Time Trial Championship		Christiane Soeder
22 September	World Time Trial Championship		Kristin Armstrong

== Results in major races ==
=== Women's World Cup 2009 ===
Kirsten Wild finished 3rd in the individual and the team finished 1st in the teams overall standing.

Results at the World Cup races
Date	#	Race	Best rider	Place
29 March	1	Trofeo Alfredo Binda-Comune di Cittiglio		
5 April	2	Tour of Flanders for Women		
13 April	3	Ronde van Drenthe		
22 April	4	La Flèche Wallonne Féminine		
10 May	5	Tour de Berne	(United States) Kristin Armstrong	1st
30 May	6	Coupe du Monde Cycliste Féminine de Montréal		
31 July	7	Open de Suède Vårgårda TTT	Cervélo TestTeam	1st
2 August	8	Open de Suède Vårgårda		
22 August	9	Grand Prix de Plouay		
13 September	10	Rund um die Nürnberger Altstadt	(Netherlands) Kirsten Wild	1st
Final individual classification			(Netherlands) Kirsten Wild	3rd
Final team classification			Cervélo TestTeam	1st

Other major single day races
Date	Race	Rider	Place
23 September	UCI Road World Championships – Women's time trial (Note: Riders are part of the national team)	Kristin Armstrong (USA)	1st
24 September	UCI Road World Championships – Women's road race (Note: Riders are part of the national team)	Kristin Armstrong (USA)	4th

== UCI World Ranking ==
The team finished 1st in the UCI ranking for teams.

Individual UCI World Ranking
Rank	Rider	Points
2	(Netherlands) Kirsten Wild	848
4	(United States) Kristin Armstrong	584.7
9	(United Kingdom) Emma Pooley	460.7
11	(Germany) Claudia Häusler	427.7
19	(Austria) Christiane Soeder	263
30	(Germany) Sarah Düster	181
32	(Netherlands) Regina Bruins	177.7
34	(Australia) Carla Ryan	170
