= 2009 Lotto–Belisol Ladiesteam season =

Fourth season for the Lotto–Belisol Ladiesteam cycling team

2009 Lotto–Belisol Ladiesteam
- UCI Team ranking: 5th

Season victories
- One-day races: 2
- Stage race overall: 1
- Stage race stages: 4
- Best ranked rider: Rochelle Gilmore (8th)

The 2009 season was the fourth for the Lotto–Belisol Ladiesteam cycling team.

== Roster ==
- Lizzie Armitstead
- Evelyn Arys
- Sofie De Vuyst
- Catherine Delfosse
- Elise Depoorter
- Rochelle Gilmore
- Vera Koedooder
- Lien Lanssens
- Emma Mac Kie
- Kim Schoonbaert
- Emma Silversides
- Linn Torp
- Annelies van Doorslaer
- Grace Verbeke

== Season victories ==
Single day and stage races 2009
Date	Nation	Race	Cat.	Winner
25 February	New Zealand	Stage 1 Women's Tour of New Zealand	2.2	(Australia) Rochelle Gilmore
26 February	New Zealand	Stage 2 Women's Tour of New Zealand	2.2	(Australia) Rochelle Gilmore
9 May	Netherlands	Omloop Door Middag-Humsterland	1.2	(Australia) Rochelle Gilmore
23 July	France	Stage 1 Tour Féminin en Limousin	2.2	(Belgium) Grace Verbeke
27 July	France	Tour Féminin en Limousin	2.2	(Belgium) Grace Verbeke
2 August	Belgium	Sparkassen Giro Bochum	1.1	(Australia) Rochelle Gilmore
12 September	France	Stage 6 Tour Cycliste Féminin International Ardèche	2.2	(United Kingdom) Lizzie Armitstead

National, Continental and World champions 2009
Date	Discipline	Jersey	Winner
	British National Track Championships – Points race		Lizzie Armitstead
	British National Track Championships – Scratch		Lizzie Armitstead
	Norwegian National Road Race Championships		Linn Torp

== Other achievements ==
=== Dutch national record, team pursuit ===
Vera Koedooder, as part of the national team, broke together with Ellen van Dijk and Amy Pieters the Dutch team pursuit record three times in 2009

Time	Speed (km/h)	Cyclists	Event	Location of race	Date	Ref
3:31.045	51.250	Vera Koedooder (Note: As part of the national selection) (with Ellen van Dijk and Amy Pieters)	2008–09 UCI Track Cycling World Cup Classics – Round 5 (qualification)	(Denmark) Copenhagen	15 February 2009	
3:29.730	51.494	Vera Koedooder (Note: As part of the national selection) (with Ellen van Dijk and Amy Pieters)	2008–09 UCI Track Cycling World Cup Classics – Round 5 (gold-medal race)	(Denmark) Copenhagen	15 February 2009	
3:29.379	51.581	Vera Koedooder (Note: As part of the national selection) (with Ellen van Dijk and Amy Pieters)	2009 UCI Track Cycling World Championships (bronze-medal race)	(Poland) Pruszków	26 March 2009	

== Results in major races ==
=== Women's World Cup 2009 ===
Grace Verbeke finished 9th in the individual and the team finished 7th in the teams overall standing.

Results at the World Cup races
Date	#	Race	Best rider	Place
29 March	1	Trofeo Alfredo Binda-Comune di Cittiglio		
5 April	2	Tour of Flanders for Women		
13 April	3	Ronde van Drenthe		
22 April	4	La Flèche Wallonne Féminine		
10 May	5	Tour de Berne		
30 May	6	Coupe du Monde Cycliste Féminine de Montréal		
31 July	7	Open de Suède Vårgårda TTT		
2 August	8	Open de Suède Vårgårda		
22 August	9	Grand Prix de Plouay		
13 September	10	Rund um die Nürnberger Altstadt		
Final individual classification			(Germany) Grace Verbeke	9th
Final team classification			Lotto–Belisol Ladiesteam	7th

Other major single day races
Date	Race	Rider	Place
26 March	UCI Track Cycling World Championships – Women's team pursuit (Note: Riders are part of the national team)	(Netherlands) Vera Koedooder (with Ellen van Dijk and Amy Pieters)	4th
23 September	UCI Road World Championships – Women's time trial (Note: Riders are part of the national team)	-	-
24 September	UCI Road World Championships – Women's road race (Note: Riders are part of the national team)	Grace Verbeke (BEL)	9th

== UCI World Ranking ==
The team finished 4th in the UCI ranking for teams.

Individual UCI World Ranking
Rank	Rider	Points
8	(Australia) Rochelle Gilmore	485
13	(Belgium) Grace Verbeke	386
58	(United Kingdom) Elizabeth Armitstead	90
125	(Netherlands) Vera Koedooder	29
214	(Denmark) Linn Torp	10
272	(Belgium) Catherine Delfosse	7
372	(United Kingdom) Emma Silversides	2
