= 2009 Open de Suède Vårgårda TTT =

2009 Open de Suède Vårgårda Team time trial
2009 UCI Women's Road World Cup, race 7 of 10

Race details
- Dates: 31 July 2009
- Stages: 1
- Distance: 41.5 km (25.8 mi)
- Winning time: 53' 16"

Results
	Winner	Cervélo Test Team
	Second	Team Columbia-HTC Women
	Third	Team Flexpoint

The 2009 Open de Suède Vårgårda – team time trial was the second team time trial running on the Open de Suède Vårgårda. It was held on 31 July 2009 over a distance of 41.5 kilometres (25.8 miles) and was the seventh race of the 2009 UCI Women's Road World Cup season.

== General standings (top 10) ==
	Team	Cyclists	Time	World Cup points
1	Cervélo Test Team	Kristin Armstrong (USA)	53' 16"	35
1	Cervélo Test Team	Regina Bruins (NED)	53' 16"	35
1	Cervélo Test Team	Sarah Düster (GER)	53' 16"	35
1	Cervélo Test Team	Carla Ryan (AUS)	53' 16"	35
1	Cervélo Test Team	Christiane Soeder (AUT)	53' 16"	35
1	Cervélo Test Team	Kirsten Wild (NED)	53' 16"	35
2	Team Columbia-HTC Women	Ellen van Dijk (NED)	+ 1' 22"	30
2	Team Columbia-HTC Women	Kimberly Anderson (GER)	+ 1' 22"	30
2	Team Columbia-HTC Women	Chantal Beltman (NED)	+ 1' 22"	30
2	Team Columbia-HTC Women	Linda Villumsen (NZL)	+ 1' 22"	30
2	Team Columbia-HTC Women	Ina Teutenberg (GER)	+ 1' 22"	30
3	Team Flexpoint	Susanne Ljungskog (SWE)	+ 1' 24"	25
3	Team Flexpoint	Loes Gunnewijk (NED)	+ 1' 24"	25
3	Team Flexpoint	Mirjam Melchers (NED)	+ 1' 24"	25
3	Team Flexpoint	Iris Slappendel (NED)	+ 1' 24"	25
4	Equipe Nürnberger Versicherung		+ 1' 25"	20
5	DSB Bank - Nederland Bloeit		+ 2' 52"	16
6	Bigla Cycling Team		+ 2' 57"	15
7	Red Sun Cycling Team		+ 3' 50"	14
8	Leontien.nl		+ 4' 17"	13
9	Sweden		+ 4' 35"	12
10	Ukraine		+ 4' 59"	11

Results from uci.ch.
