= 2009 in women's road cycling =

== UCI Road World Rankings ==
Top-ranked individual	Second-ranked individual	Third-ranked individual	Top-ranked team	Top-ranked nation
Marianne Vos (NED); DSB Bank–LTO	Kirsten Wild (NED); Cervelo Test Team	Emma Johansson (SWE); Red Sun Cycling Team	Cervelo Test Team	Netherlands

== World Championships ==
Race	Date	Winner	Second	Third
World Championship Time Trial	September 23	Kristin Armstrong (USA)	Noemi Cantele (ITA)	Linda Villumsen (DEN)
World Championship Road Race	September 26	Tatiana Guderzo (ITA)	Marianne Vos (NED)	Noemi Cantele (ITA)

== UCI World Cup ==
	Date	Race	Country	Winner	Second	Third
#1	29 March	Trofeo Alfredo Binda-Comune di Cittiglio	Italy	Marianne Vos (NED)		
#2	5 April	Tour of Flanders for Women	Belgium	Ina-Yoko Teutenberg (GER)		
#3	13 April	Ronde van Drenthe	Netherlands	Emma Johansson (SWE)		
#4	22 April	La Flèche Wallonne Féminine	Belgium	Marianne Vos (NED)		
#5	10 May	Tour de Berne	Switzerland	Kristin Armstrong (USA)		
#6	30 May	Coupe du Monde Cycliste Féminine de Montréal	Canada	Emma Pooley (GBR)		
#7	31 July	Open de Suède Vårgårda TTT	Sweden	Cervélo TestTeam; Kristin Armstrong; Regina Bruins; Carla Ryan; Christiane Soeder; Kirsten Wild; Sarah Düster	Team Columbia–HTC Women; Kimberly Anderson; Chantal Beltman; Emilia Fahlin; Ina-Yoko Teutenberg; Ellen van Dijk; Linda Villumsen	Team Flexpoint; Susanne Ljungskog; Mirjam Melchers; Loes Gunnewijk; Loes Markerink; Trine Schmidt; Iris Slappendel
#8	2 August	Open de Suède Vårgårda	Sweden	Marianne Vos (NED)		
#9	22 August	GP de Plouay – Bretagne	France	Emma Pooley (GBR)		
#10	13 September	Rund um die Nürnberger Altstadt	Germany	Kirsten Wild (NED)		

== Single day races (1.1 and 1.2) ==
Race	Date	Cat.	Winner
(Belgium) Omloop Het Volk / Circuit Het Volk	February 28	1.2	Suzanne de Goede (NED)
(New Zealand) Masterton Cup	March 1	1.1	Chloe Hosking (AUS)
(Switzerland) Gran Premio Brissag – Lago maggiore	March 7	1.2	Noemi Cantele (ITA)
(Italy) GP Costa Etrusca – Giro dei Comuni Rosignano-Livorno	March 20	1.2	Emma Pooley (GBR)
(Italy) Costa Etrusca-Gran Premio Comuni di Riparbella-Montescudaio	March 21	1.2	Sarah Düster (GER)
(Italy) Trofeo Costa Etrusca-Memorial Tiziano Saba-GP Comuni di Santa Luce-Castellina M.Ma	March 22	1.2	Linda Villumsen (DEN)
(Belgium) Grand Prix de Dottignies	April 6	1.2	Sarah Düster (GER)
(Netherlands) Drentse 8 van Dwingeloo	April 10	1.1	Ina-Yoko Teutenberg (GER)
(Netherlands) Novilon Eurocup Ronde van Drenthe	April 11	1.1	Marianne Vos (NED)
(China) Tour of Chongming Island Time Trial	April 17	1.1	Bridie O'Donnell (AUS)
(Netherlands) Ronde van Gelderland	April 18	1.2	Ina-Yoko Teutenberg (GER)
(Netherlands) Omloop van Borsele	April 25	1.2	Kirsten Wild (NED)
(Italy) GP Liberazione	April 25	1.2	Giorgia Bronzini (ITA)
(Belgium) GP Stad Roeselare	April 26	1.2	Kirsten Wild (NED)
(Switzerland) Grand Prix de Suisse	May 1	1.1	Christiane Soeder (AUT)
(Luxembourg) Grand Prix Elsy Jacobs	May 1	1.1	Svetlana Bubnenkova (RUS)
(Netherlands) Omloop Door Middag-Humsterland	May 9	1.2	Rochelle Gilmore (AUS)
(United States) Liberty Classic	June 7	1.1	Ina-Yoko Teutenberg (GER)
(Netherlands) Therme kasseienomloop	June 7	1.2	Chantal Blaak (NED)
(Spain) Emakumeen Saria	June 9	1.2	Noemi Cantele (ITA)
(Italy) GP Cento Carnevale d'Europa	July 18	1.2	Giorgia Bronzini (ITA)
(Germany) Sparkassen Giro	August 2	1.1	Rochelle Gilmore (AUS)
(Netherlands) Holland Hills Classic	August 9	1.2	Marianne Vos (NED)
(Netherlands) Blauwe Stad Team Time Trial	August 29	1.2	Cervelo Test Team
(Italy) Memorial Davide Fardelli – Cronometro Individuale	September 6	1.2	Karin Thürig (SUI)
(France) Chrono Champenois	September 13	1.1	Wendy Houvenaghel (GBR)
(France) Chrono des Nations	October 18	1.1	Jeannie Longo (FRA)

== Stage races (2.1 and 2.2) ==
Race	Date	Cat.	Winner
Ladies Tour of Qatar	February 8–10	2.1	Kirsten Wild (NED)
Women's Tour of New Zealand	February 25–27	2.2	Amber Halliday (AUS)
(China) Tour of Chongming Island	April 18–21	2.1	Chloe Hosking (AUS)
(Czech Republic) Gracia–Orlová	April 30 – May 3	2.2	Trixi Worrack (GER)
(France) Tour de l'Aude Cycliste Féminin	May 15–24	2.1	Claudia Häusler (GER)
Vuelta Ciclista Femenina a Costa Rica	May 28–31	2.2	Evelyn García (ESA)
(Canada) Tour du Grand Montréal	June 1–4	2.1	Kirsten Wild (NED)
(Canada) Tour de Pei	June 7–11	2.2	Tara Whitten (CAN)
(Spain) Iurreta-Emakumeen Bira	June 11–14	2.1	Judith Arndt (GER)
(Italy) Giro del Trentino Alto Adige-Südtirol	June 18–19	2.1	Nicole Cooke (GBR)
(Netherlands) Rabo Ster Zeeuwsche Eilanden	June 18–20	2.2	Ina-Yoko Teutenberg (GER)
(France) Grande Boucle Féminine Internationale	June 18–21	2.2	Emma Pooley (GBR)
(Czech Republic) Tour Feminin – O cenu Ceskeho Svycarska	July 9–12	2.2	Alexandra Burchenkova (RUS)
(Italy) Giro d'Italia Femminile	July 3–12	2.1	Claudia Häusler (GER)
(France) Tour de Bretagne Féminin	July 16–19	2.2	Liesbet De Vocht (BEL)
(France) Tour Féminin en Limousin	July 23–26	2.2	Grace Verbeke (BEL)
(Germany) International Thüringen Rundfahrt der Frauen	July 21–26	2.1	Linda Villumsen (DEN)
La Route de France	August 9–14	2.1	Kimberly Anderson (USA)
(Germany) Albstadt-Frauen-Etappenrennen	August 21–23	2.2	Charlotte Becker (GER)
(France) Trophée d'Or Féminin	August 25–29	2.2	Diana Žiliūtė (LTU)
(Netherlands) Holland Ladies Tour	September 1–6	2.2	Marianne Vos (NED)
(France) Tour Cycliste Féminin International Ardèche	September 8–12	2.2	Kristin Armstrong (USA)
(Italy) Giro della Toscana Int. Femminile – Memorial Michela Fanini	September 15–20	2.1	Diana Žiliūtė (LTU)

== Continental Championships ==
=== Asian Championships ===
Race	Date	Winner	Second	Third
Road race	August	Tang Kerong (CHN)	Hsiao Mei-yu (TPE)	Natalya Stefanskaya (KAZ)
Individual time trial	August	Tang Kerong (CHN)	Chanpeng Nontasin (THA)	Marina Andreichenko (KAZ)

=== European Championships (under-23) ===
Race	Date	Winner	Second	Third
Road race (under-23)	July 4	Chantal Blaak (NED)	Katie Colclough (GBR)	Marianne Vos (NED)
Time trial (under-23)	July 1	Ellen van Dijk (NED)	Emilia Fahlin (SWE)	Marianne Vos (NED)

== See also ==
- 2009 in men's road cycling
