= 2009 Giro della Toscana Int. Femminile – Memorial Michela Fanini =

Race details
- Dates: 15–20 September 2009
- Stages: 6
- Winning time: 11h 47' 16"

Results
	Winner	Diana Žiliūtė (LTU)	(Safi–Pasta Zara–Titanedi)
	Second	Luisa Tamanini (ITA)	(Selle Italia–Ghezzi)
	Third	Charlotte Becker (GER)	(Equipe Nürnberger Versicherung)
	Points	Marianne Vos (NED)	(DSB Bank–LTO)
	Mountains	Luisa Tamanini (ITA)	(Selle Italia–Ghezzi)
	Sprints	Shelley Olds (USA)	(United States national team)
	Team	Safi–Pasta Zara–Titanedi	

The 2009 Giro della Toscana Int. Femminile – Memorial Michela Fanini was the 16th edition of the Giro della Toscana Int. Femminile – Memorial Michela Fanini, a women's cycling stage race in Italy. It was rated by the UCI as a category 2.1 race and was held between 15 and 20 September 2009.

== Stages ==
=== Stage 1 ===
15 September 2009 – Viareggio to Viareggio, 5.5 km (3.4 mi), Team time trial

Stage 1 result

	Team	Riders	Time
1	Bigla Cycling Team	Nicole Brändli (SUI); Modesta Vžesniauskaitė (LTU); Noemi Cantele (ITA); Jennifer Hohl (SUI); Monica Holler (SWE); Bettina Kühn (SUI); Veronica Andrèasson (SWE)	6' 45"
2	Equipe Nürnberger Versicherung	Trixi Worrack (GER); Charlotte Becker (GER); Lisa Brennauer (GER); Regina Schleicher (GER); Marie Lindberg (SWE); Madeleine Sandig (GER); Marlen Johrend (GER); Romy Kasper (GER)	+1"
3	Netherlands national team	Chantal Blaak (NED); Iris Slappendel (NED); Lucinda Brand (NED); Andrea Bosman (NED); Anne Eversdijk (NED); Petra Dijkman (NED)	+3"

General Classification after Stage 1

	Rider	Team	Time
1	Nicole Brändli (SUI)	Bigla Cycling Team	6' 45"
2	Modesta Vžesniauskaitė (LTU)	Bigla Cycling Team	+0"
3	Noemi Cantele (ITA)	Bigla Cycling Team	+0"

=== Stage 2 ===
16 September 2009 – Porcari to Altopascio, 124.1 km (77.1 mi)

Stage 2 result

	Rider	Team	Time
1	Giorgia Bronzini (ITA)	Safi Pasta Zara Titanedi	3h 08' 25"
2	Ina-Yoko Teutenberg (GER)	Team Columbia–HTC Women	s.t.
3	Monia Baccaille (ITA)	S.C. Michela Fanini Record Rox	s.t.

General Classification after Stage 2

	Rider	Team	Time
1	Monica Holler (SWE)	Bigla Cycling Team	3h 15' 09"
2	Nicole Brändli (SUI)	Bigla Cycling Team	+1"
3	Jennifer Hohl (SUI)	Bigla Cycling Team	+1"

=== Stage 3 ===
17 September 2009 – Lari to Volterra, 122.1 km (75.9 mi)

Stage 3 result

	Rider	Team	Time
1	Tatiana Guderzo (ITA)	S.C. Michela Fanini Record Rox	3h 19' 26"
2	Marianne Vos (NED)	DSB Bank–LTO	+16"
3	Mara Abbott (USA)	Team Columbia–HTC	+18"

General Classification after Stage 3

	Rider	Team	Time
1	Tatiana Guderzo (ITA)	S.C. Michela Fanini Record	6h 34' 42"
2	Marianne Vos (NED)	DSB Bank–LTO	+17"
3	Nicole Brändli (SUI)	Bigla Cycling Team	+18"

=== Stage 4 ===
18 September 2009 – Campi Bisenzio to Campi Bisenzio, 4.4 km (2.7 mi)

Stage 4 result

	Rider	Team	Time
1	Marianne Vos (NED)	DSB Bank–LTO	2' 56"
2	Ellen van Dijk (NED)	Team Columbia–HTC	+6"
3	Diana Žiliūtė (LTU)	Safi–Pasta Zara–Titanedi	+7"

General Classification after Stage 4

	Rider	Team	Time
1	Tatiana Guderzo (ITA)	S.C. Michela Fanini Record	6h 37' 47"
2	Marianne Vos (NED)	DSB Bank–LTO	+ 7"
3	Nicole Brändli (SUI)	Bigla Cycling Team	+21"

=== Stage 5 ===
19 September 2009 – Segromigno in Piano to Capannor, 100.9 km (62.7 mi)

Stage 5 result

	Rider	Team	Time
1	Ina-Yoko Teutenberg (GER)	Team Columbia–HTC Women	2h 39' 38"
2	Diana Žiliūtė (LTU)	Safi–Pasta Zara–Titanedi	s.t.
3	Shelley Olds (USA)	United States national team	s.t.

General Classification after Stage 5

	Rider	Team	Time
2	Diana Žiliūtė (LTU)	Safi–Pasta Zara–Titanedi	9h 18' 13"
2	Luisa Tamanini (ITA)	Selle Italia–Ghezzi	+1' 31"
3	Charlotte Becker (SUI)	Equipe Nürnberger Versicherung	+3' 08"

=== Stage 6 ===
20 September 2009 – Quarrata to Florence, 106.9 km (66.4 mi)

Stage 6 result

	Rider	Team	Time
1	Marianne Vos (NED)	DSB Bank–LTO	2h 29' 03"
2	Giorgia Bronzini (ITA)	Safi–Pasta Zara–Titanedi	s.t.
3	Yuliya Martisova (RUS)	Gauss RDZ Ormu–Colnago	s.t.

General Classification after Stage 6

	Rider	Team	Time
1	Diana Žiliūtė (LTU)	Safi–Pasta Zara–Titanedi	11h 47' 16"
2	Luisa Tamanini (ITA)	Selle Italia–Ghezzi	+1' 31"
3	Charlotte Becker (GER)	Equipe Nürnberger Versicherung	+3' 08"

== Final classification ==
	Rider	Team	Time
1	Diana Žiliūtė (LTU)	Safi–Pasta Zara–Titanedi	11h 47' 16"
2	Luisa Tamanini (ITA)	Selle Italia–Ghezzi	+1' 31"
3	Charlotte Becker (GER)	Equipe Nürnberger Versicherung	+3' 08"
4	Marianne Vos (NED)	DSB Bank–LTO	+5' 09"
5	Tatiana Guderzo (ITA)	S.C. Michela Fanini Record Rox	+5' 12"
6	Nicole Brändli (SUI)	Bigla Cycling Team	+5' 33"
7	Judith Arndt (GER)	Team Columbia–HTC	+5' 36"
8	Mara Abbott (USA)	Team Columbia–HTC	+6' 00"
9	Kristin McGrath (USA)	United States national team	+6' 03"
10	Edita Pučinskaitė (LTU)	Gauss RDZ Ormu–Colnago	+6' 03"

== See also ==
- 2009 in women's road cycling
