= Open de Suède Vårgårda =

Bicycle race

Race details
- Date: July/August
- Region: Vårgårda Municipality of Sweden
- English name: Swedish Open Vårgårda
- Discipline: Road
- Competition: UCI Women's World Tour (since 2016)
- Type: One-day race
- Organiser: Vårgårda Cykelklubb
- Web site: www.vargardacycling.se

History
- First edition: Road race: 2006; Team time trial: 2008
- Editions: Road race: 15 (as of 2022); Team time trial: 13 (as of 2022)
- Final edition: 2022
- First winner: Road race Susanne Ljungskog (SWE); Team time trial Cervélo Lifeforce Pro Cycling Team
- Most wins: Road race Marianne Vos (NED) (3 wins)
- Final winner: Road race Audrey Cordon-Ragot (FRA); Team time trial Trek–Segafredo

Open de Suède Vårgårda was an elite professional women's road bicycle event held annually in the Vårgårda Municipality of Sweden. Created in 2006, the Open de Suède Vårgårda was part of the UCI Women's Road World Cup until 2015 and sanctioned by the Swedish Cycling Federation. Since 2008, a team time trial has been held in conjunction with the main race as a part of the UCI Women's Road World Cup. From 2016, the race was part of the new UCI Women's World Tour.

In January 2023, the Vårgårda Cykelklubb ceased the organisation of the races due to economic reasons.

== Past winners ==
=== Road race ===
| Year | Winner | Second | Third |
|---|---|---|---|
| 2006 | (Sweden) Susanne Ljungskog | (United Kingdom) Nicole Cooke | (Sweden) Monica Holler |
| 2007 | (Netherlands) Chantal Beltman | (Switzerland) Karin Thürig | (Italy) Noemi Cantele |
| 2008 | (United States) Kori Seehafer | (United States) Kimberly Anderson | (Germany) Charlotte Becker |
| 2009 | (Netherlands) Marianne Vos | (Netherlands) Kirsten Wild | (Sweden) Emma Johansson |
| 2010 | (Netherlands) Kirsten Wild | (Netherlands) Adrie Visser | (Sweden) Emma Johansson |
| 2011 | (Netherlands) Annemiek van Vleuten | (Netherlands) Ellen van Dijk | (United Kingdom) Nicole Cooke |
| 2012 | (Netherlands) Iris Slappendel | (Germany) Hanka Kupfernagel | (Netherlands) Marianne Vos |
| 2013 | (Netherlands) Marianne Vos | (Sweden) Emma Johansson | (Netherlands) Amy Pieters |
| 2014 | (Netherlands) Chantal Blaak | (Netherlands) Amy Pieters | (Netherlands) Roxane Knetemann |
| 2015 | (Belgium) Jolien D'Hoore | (Italy) Giorgia Bronzini | (Australia) Tiffany Cromwell |
| 2016 | (Sweden) Emilia Fahlin | (Finland) Lotta Lepistö | (Netherlands) Chantal Blaak |
| 2017 | (Finland) Lotta Lepistö | (Netherlands) Marianne Vos | (Canada) Leah Kirchmann |
| 2018 | (Netherlands) Marianne Vos | (Netherlands) Kirsten Wild | (Finland) Lotta Lepistö |
| 2019 | (Italy) Marta Bastianelli | (Netherlands) Marianne Vos | (Netherlands) Lorena Wiebes |
| 2020 | No race due to COVID-19 pandemic | | |
| 2021 | No race due to COVID-19 pandemic | | |
| 2022 | (France) Audrey Cordon-Ragot | (United Kingdom) Pfeiffer Georgi | (Belgium) Valerie Demey |

=== Team time trial ===
| Year | Winner | Second | Third |
|---|---|---|---|
| 2008 | Cervélo–Lifeforce Pro Cycling Team; Priska Doppmann; Karin Thürig; Christiane Soeder; Carla Ryan | Team Columbia Women; Linda Villumsen; Ina-Yoko Teutenberg; Alexis Rhodes; Kimberly Anderson | Equipe Nürnberger Versicherung; Charlotte Becker; Suzanne de Goede; Christina Becker; Marie Lindberg |
| 2009 | Cervélo TestTeam; Kristin Armstrong; Regina Bruins; Carla Ryan; Christiane Soeder; Kirsten Wild; Sarah Düster | Team Columbia–HTC Women; Kimberly Anderson; Chantal Beltman; Emilia Fahlin; Ina-Yoko Teutenberg; Ellen van Dijk; Linda Villumsen | Team Flexpoint; Susanne Ljungskog; Mirjam Melchers; Loes Gunnewijk; Loes Markerink; Trine Schmidt; Iris Slappendel |
| 2010 | Cervélo TestTeam; Charlotte Becker; Regina Bruins; Iris Slappendel; Kirsten Wild | Team HTC–Columbia Women; Judith Arndt; Ellen van Dijk; Adrie Visser; Linda Villumsen | Nederland bloeit Liesbet De Vocht; Loes Gunnewijk; Annemiek van Vleuten; Marianne Vos |
| 2011 | HTC–Highroad Women; Judith Arndt; Charlotte Becker; Amber Neben; Ellen van Dijk | AA-Drink Cycling Team; Lucinda Brand; Linda Melanie Villumsen; Kirsten Wild; Trixi Worrack | Garmin–Cervélo; Elizabeth Armitstead; Noemi Cantele; Sharon Laws; Emma Pooley; Iris Slappendel |
| 2012 | Team Specialized–lululemon; Charlotte Becker; Amber Neben; Evelyn Stevens; Ina Teutenberg; Ellen van Dijk; Trixi Worrack | Orica–AIS; Judith Arndt; Shara Gillow; Loes Gunnewijk; Claudia Häusler; Alexis Rhodes; Linda Villumsen | Rabobank Women Cycling Team; Tatiana Antoshina; Thalita de Jong; Liesbet De Vocht; Roxane Knetemann; Iris Slappendel; Marianne Vos |
| 2013 | Specialized–lululemon; Ellen van Dijk (NED); Evelyn Stevens (USA); Lisa Brennauer (GER); Trixi Worrack (GER); Carmen Small (USA) (+ 3' 46); Loren Rowney (AUS) (DNF) | Rabobank-Liv Giant; Marianne Vos (NED); Annemiek van Vleuten (NED); Thalita de Jong (NED); Lucinda Brand (NED); Pauline Ferrand-Prévot (FRA) (+ 3"); Roxane Knetemann (NED) (+ 3' 44") | Orica–AIS; Emma Johansson (SWE); Amanda Spratt (AUS); Melissa Hoskins (AUS); Shara Gillow (AUS); Loes Gunnewijk (NED) (+ 5' 56"); Jessie MacLean (AUS) (+ 5' 56") |
| 2014 | Specialized–lululemon; Trixi Worrack (GER); Evelyn Stevens (USA); Karol-Ann Canuel (CAN); Lisa Brennauer (GER); Chantal Blaak (NED) | Rabobank-Liv Woman Cycling Team; Marianne Vos (NED); Thalita de Jong (NED); Annemiek van Vleuten (NED); Anna van der Breggen (NED) | Boels–Dolmans; Ellen van Dijk (NED); Lizzie Armitstead (GBR); Christine Majerus (LUX); Megan Guarnier (USA) |
| 2015 | Rabobank-Liv Woman Cycling Team; Lucinda Brand (NED); Thalita de Jong (NED); Shara Gillow (AUS); Anna van der Breggen (NED); Katarzyna Niewiadoma (POL) (+ 2' 59"); Moniek Tenniglo (NED) (DNF) | Velocio–SRAM; Trixi Worrack (GER); Alena Amialiusik (BLR); Karol-Ann Canuel (CAN); Lisa Brennauer (GER); Élise Delzenne (FRA) (+ 5' 41"); Mieke Kröger (GER) (DNF) | Boels–Dolmans; Chantal Blaak (NED); Lizzie Armitstead (GBR); Christine Majerus (LUX); Evelyn Stevens (USA); Katarzyna Pawłowska (POL) (+ 5' 36"); Romy Kasper (GER) (DNF) |
| 2016 | Boels–Dolmans; Elizabeth Armitstead (GBR); Chantal Blaak (NED); Ellen van Dijk (NED); Karol-Ann Canuel (CAN); Katarzyna Pawłowska (POL); Evelyn Stevens (USA) | Cervélo–Bigla Pro Cycling; Ashleigh Moolman (RSA); Joëlle Numainville (CAN); Stephanie Pohl (GER); Lotta Lepistö (FIN); Lisa Klein (GER); Nicole Hanselmann (SUI) | Rabobank-Liv Woman Cycling Team; Anouska Koster (NED); Roxane Knetemann (NED); Shara Gillow (AUS); Marianne Vos (NED); Moniek Tenniglo (NED); Anna van der Breggen (NED) |
| 2017 | Boels–Dolmans; Chantal Blaak (NED); Karol-Ann Canuel (CAN); Amalie Dideriksen (DEN); Christine Majerus (LUX); Amy Pieters (NED); Anna van der Breggen (NED) | Cervélo–Bigla Pro Cycling; Nicole Hanselmann (SUI); Lisa Klein (GER); Clara Koppenburg (GER); Lotta Lepistö (FIN); Ashleigh Moolman (RSA); Cecilie Uttrup Ludwig (DEN) | Canyon//SRAM; Hannah Barnes (GBR); Lisa Brennauer (GER); Elena Cecchini (ITA); Mieke Kröger (GER); Alexis Ryan (USA); Trixi Worrack (GER) |
| 2018 | Boels–Dolmans; Chantal Blaak (NED); Karol-Ann Canuel (CAN); Amalie Dideriksen (DEN); Christine Majerus (LUX); Amy Pieters (NED); Anna van der Breggen (NED) | Team Sunweb; Lucinda Brand (NED); Leah Kirchmann (CAN); Juliette Labous (FRA); Floortje Mackaij (NED); Pernille Mathiesen (DEN); Coryn Rivera (USA) | Cervélo–Bigla Pro Cycling; Ann-Sophie Duyck (BEL); Clara Koppenburg (GER); Lotta Lepistö (FIN); Cecilie Uttrup Ludwig (DEN); Ashleigh Moolman (SAF); Emma Norsgaard Jørgensen (DEN) |
| 2019 | Trek–Segafredo; Audrey Cordon-Ragot (FRA); Elisa Longo Borghini (ITA); Ellen van Dijk (NED); Tayler Wiles (USA); Ruth Winder (USA); Trixi Worrack (GER) | Canyon//SRAM; Alena Amialiusik (BLR); Alice Barnes (GBR); Hannah Barnes (GBR); Elena Cecchini (ITA); Lisa Klein (GER) | Team Sunweb; Lucinda Brand (NED); Leah Kirchmann (CAN); Juliette Labous (FRA); Floortje Mackaij (NED); Pernille Mathiesen (DEN); Coryn Rivera (USA) |
| 2020 | No race due to COVID-19 pandemic | | |
| 2021 | No race due to COVID-19 pandemic | | |
| 2022 | Trek–Segafredo; Ellen van Dijk (NED); Audrey Cordon-Ragot (FRA); Amalie Dideriksen (DEN); Shirin van Anrooij (NED) | SD Worx; Chantal van den Broek-Blaak (NED); Demi Vollering (NED); Christine Majerus (LUX); Blanka Vas (HUN); Elena Cecchini (ITA) | Team DSM; Francesca Barale (ITA); Esmée Peperkamp (NED); Pfeiffer Georgi (GBR); Lorena Wiebes (NED); Floortje Mackaij (NED) |
