= Naiara =

Naiara is a feminine given name. Notable people with the name include:

- Naiara Azevedo (born 1989), Brazilian singer-songwriter
- Naiara Beristain (born 1992), Spanish football player
- Naiara Egozkue (born 1983), Spanish handball player
- Naiara Moreno (born 1997), Spanish singer
- Naiara Telletxea (born 1984), Spanish road cyclist
