= Naiara Telletxea =

Spanish cyclist

Personal information
- Full name: Naiara Telletxea Lopez
- Born: 18 April 1984 (age 42) Spain

Cycling career
- Sport: Cycling
- Discipline: Road cycling

Professional teams
- 2008: Debabarrena-Kirolgi
- 2010: Debabarrena-Kirolgi

Naiara Telletxea Lopez (born 18 April 1984) is a road cyclist from Spain. She represented her nation at the 2006 UCI Road World Championships.
