= Team MTN–Qhubeka =

South African cycling team

Team information
- UCI code: MTN (2008); MTW (2009–2010); MTN (2011–2012)
- Registered: South Africa (2008–2009)
- Founded: 2008
- Disbanded: 2012
- Discipline: Road
- Status: National (2008); UCI Women's Team (2009–2010); National (2011–2012)

Team name history
- 2008–2010 2011–2012: MTN; Team MTN–Qhubeka

Team MTN–Qhubeka (UCI team code: MTN) was a South African professional cycling team, which competed in elite road bicycle racing events such as the UCI Women's Road World Cup.

== Major wins ==
2008
Stage 4 Tour of Chongming Island, Cherise Taylor

== National and continental champions ==
2008
African Road Race, Cashandra Slingerland
African Time Trial, Cashandra Slingerland
South Africa Road Race, Cherise Taylor
South Africa Time Trial, Marissa van der Merwe
2009
African Time Trial, Cashandra Slingerland
South Africa Time Trial, Cashandra Slingerland
2010
African Road Race, Lylanie Lauwrens
African Time Trial, Lylanie Lauwrens
South Africa Time Trial, Cashandra Slingerland
