= Patricia Schwager =

Swiss cyclist

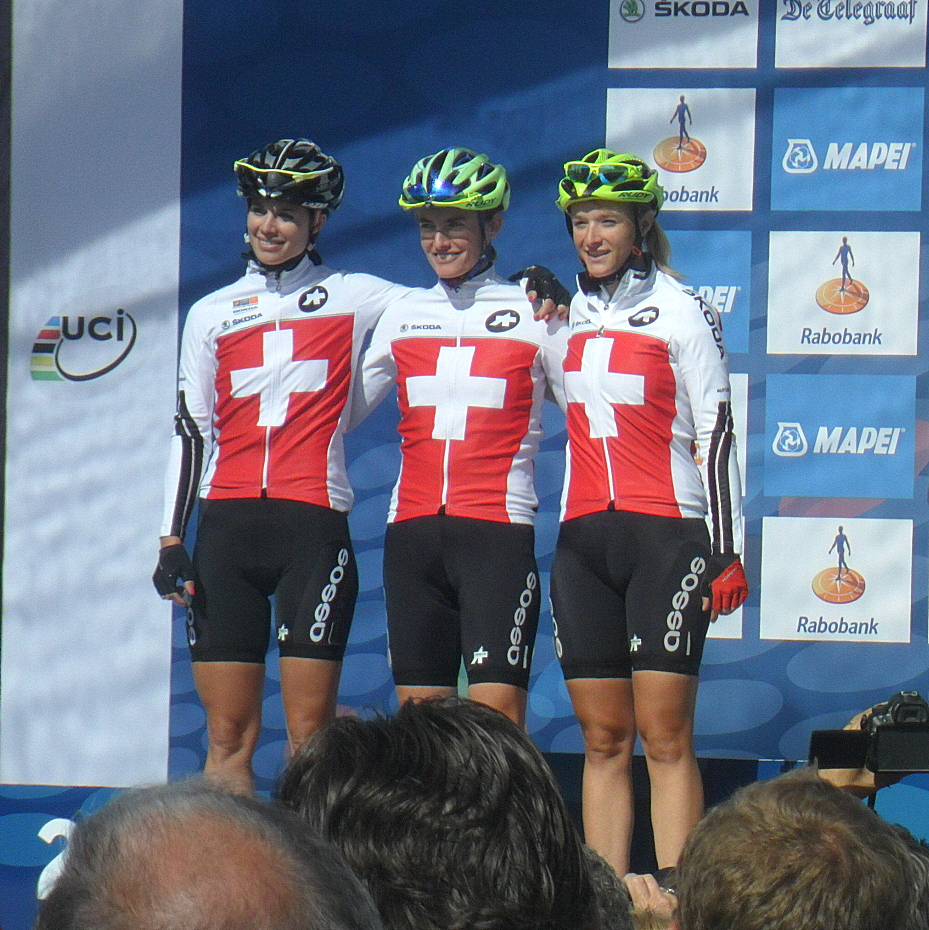
- Patricia Schwager (center) at the 2012 UCI Road World Championships

Personal information
- Born: 6 December 1983 (age 42) Balterswil, Switzerland

Cycling career
- Sport: Cycling
- Discipline: Road
- Role: Rider

Professional teams
- 2006: Elk Haus–NÖ
- 2007–2010: Raleigh–Lifeforce–Creation HB Pro Cycling Team
- 2011: Nederland bloeit
- 2012: Forno d'Asolo Colavita
- 2013: Faren–Let's Go Finland
- 2014–2016: Team TIBCO–To The Top

Patricia Schwager (born 6 December 1983) is a Swiss former professional racing cyclist. She competed in the 2012 UCI women's road race in Valkenburg aan de Geul and in the 2013 UCI women's road race in Florence.

Schwager trained as a pastry chef and worked part-time in the profession. She began her cycling career in 1998 in the junior tournaments. Competing in the Swiss National Time Trial Championships, she finished second three times between 2009 and 2011 and fourth at the Chrono des Nations in France in 2010, before winning the title in 2012 and 2013. Injuries prevented her from competing in the Time Trial World Championships later that year. Schwager retired from professional cycling in 2016 due to persistent health issues.

== See also ==
- 2009 Cervélo TestTeam (women) season
