= Noortje Tabak =

Dutch cyclist (born 1988)

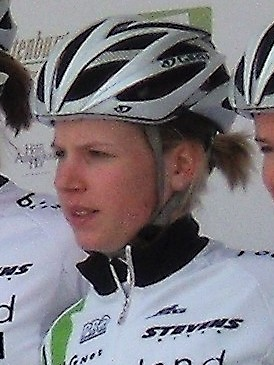

Personal information
- Born: 13 July 1988 (age 38) Bergeijk, Netherlands

Cycling career
- Sport: Cycling
- Discipline: Road cycling

Professional team
- 2007–2011: Team DSB Bank

Noortje "Noor" Tabak (born 13 July 1988 in Bergeijk) is a road cyclist from the Netherlands. At the 2010 European Road Championships she won the under-23 women's road race. She competed later the year in the women's road race at the 2010 UCI Road World Championships, finishing 32nd.

== Biography ==
Her first international appearance was in 2006 when she represented as a junior the Netherlands at the 2006 European Road Championships. She became in the Netherlands regional champion in 2009. At the 2010 European Road Championships in Ankara, Turkey, she became European Champion winning the under-23 women's road race. In the race she won the sprint of the breakaway group ahead of Lesya Kalytovska from Ukraine and Ausrine Trebaite from Lithuania. WIth her title, she was automatically selected for the 2010 UCI Road World Championships.

=== Personal life ===
Tabak was born in 1988 as the daughter of professional cyclist Gerard Tabak. She has an older sister. As of 2009 she lived in Bergeijk, Netherlands. She studied medicine. She worked as a general practitioner.

Tabak has a relationship with cyclist Pim Ligthart. Together they have two children.

== See also ==
- 2009 DSB Bank-LTO season
