= Tania Belvederesi =

Italian cyclist

Personal information
- Born: 31 January 1978 (age 48) Italy

Cycling career
- Sport: Cycling
- Discipline: Road cycling

Professional teams
- 2007: A.S. Team FRW
- 2008–2009: Gauss Rdz Ormu
- 2010: Team Valdarno Umbria
- 2011: Kleo Ladies Team

Tania Belvederesi (born 31 January 1978) is a road cyclist from Italy. She represented her nation at the 2004 UCI Road World Championships.
