= Cyclelive Plus–Zannata =

Belgian cycling team

Team information
- UCI code: CZT
- Registered: Belgium
- Founded: 2013
- Disbanded: 2013 (merged with Team Futurumshop.nl)
- Discipline: Road
- Status: UCI Women's Team

Team name history
- 2013: Cyclelive Plus–Zannata

Cyclelive Plus–Zannata (UCI team code: CZT) was a Belgian professional cycling team, which competed in elite road bicycle racing events such as the UCI Women's Road World Cup.
