= Annelies Van Doorslaer =

Belgian cyclist (born 1989)

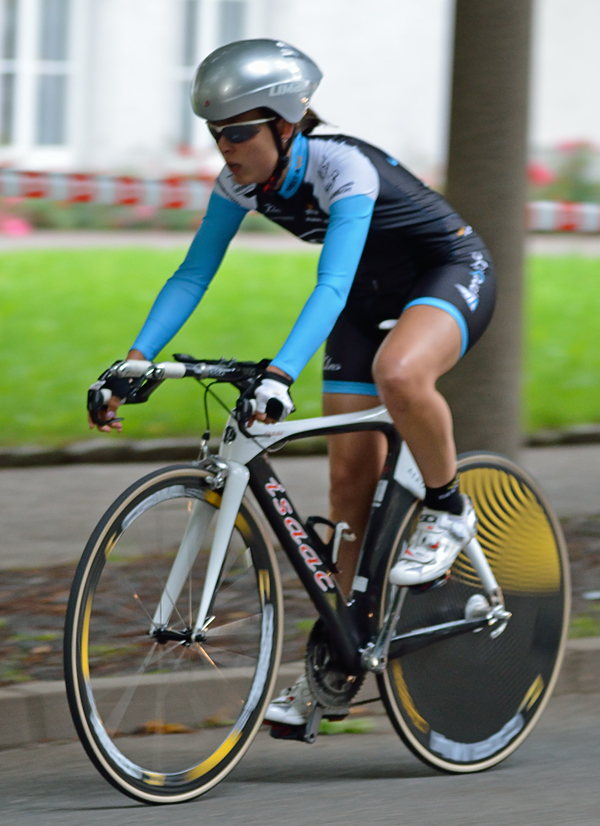
- Van Doorslaer in 2012

Personal information
- Born: 15 January 1989 (age 37) Antwerp, Belgium

Cycling career
- Sport: Cycling
- Current team: Retired
- Discipline: Road
- Role: Rider

Professional teams
- 2008–2010: Lotto–Belisol Ladiesteam
- 2011: Topsport Vlaanderen–Ridley
- 2012: Kleo Ladies Team
- 2013: Cyclelive Plus–Zannata
- 2014–2015: Team Futurumshop.nl–Polaris

Annelies Van Doorslaer (born 15 January 1989) is a Belgian former racing cyclist. She competed in the 2013 UCI women's road race in Florence.

== Major results ==
2012
9th Holland Hills Classic
2014
5th Erondegemse Pijl
2015
1st Time trial, Flemish Brabant Provincial Road Championships
8th Erondegemse Pijl

== See also ==
- 2009 Lotto-Belisol Ladiesteam season
