= Lieselot Decroix =

Belgian cyclist

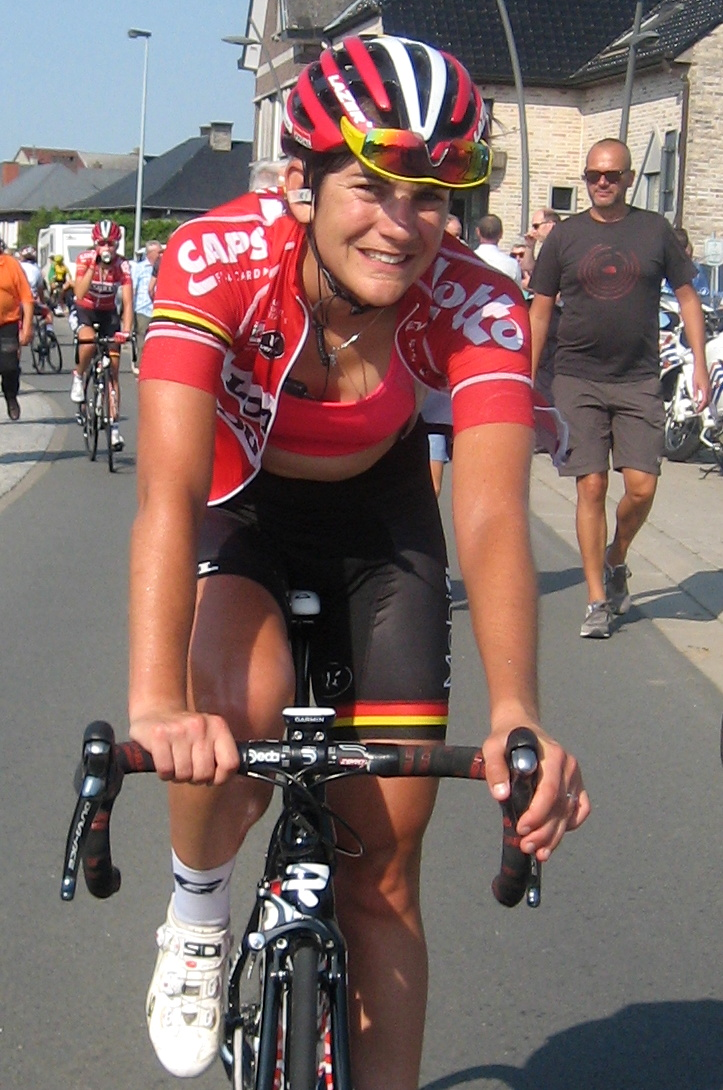

Personal information
- Full name: Lieselot Decroix
- Born: 12 May 1987 (age 39) Poperinge, Belgium
- Height: 1.67 m (5 ft 5 1/2 in)
- Weight: 50 kg (110 lb)

Cycling career
- Sport: Cycling
- Discipline: Road
- Role: Rider

Professional teams
- 2007–2008: Lotto–Belisol Ladiesteam
- 2009–2010: Cervélo TestTeam
- 2011: Topsport Vlaanderen–Mercator
- 2012: Dolmans–Boels
- 2013: CyclelivePlus-Zannata
- 2014-2016: Lotto–Belisol Ladies

Lieselot Decroix (born 12 May 1987 in Poperinge) is a Belgian retired professional road cyclist. She represented her nation Belgium at the 2008 Summer Olympics, and has currently competed under an annual contract for CyclelivePlus-Zannata Women's Team.

Decroix qualified for the Belgian squad, as a lone female cyclist, in the women's road race at the 2008 Summer Olympics in Beijing by finishing among the top 24 and receiving a berth from the UCI World Cup. She successfully completed a grueling race with a forty-fourth-place finish through a vast field of sixty-six cyclists in 3:36:35, surpassing Mexico's Alessandra Grassi by less than a second.

== Major results ==
2007
7th Overall Tour Cycliste Féminin International de l'Ardèche

1st Young rider classification

2008
8th Road race, UEC European Under-23 Road Championships
10th La Flèche Wallonne Féminine
2009
National Road Championships

3rd Time trial
4th Road race

2011
8th Overall Gracia–Orlová

1st Stage 4

2015
9th Overall Belgium Tour
10th Cholet Pays de Loire Dames
2016
3rd Ronde van Gelderland
