= Debabarrena–Gipuzkoa =

Basque cycling team

Team information
- UCI code: DKT (2008–2010); DEB (2011–2012)
- Registered: Spain
- Founded: 2008
- Disbanded: 2012
- Discipline: Road
- Status: UCI Women's Team
- Bicycles: Orbea

Key personnel
- General manager: Juan Jose Sebastian
- Team manager: Javier Riaño

Team name history
- 2008–2010 2011–2012: Debabarrena–Kirolgi; Debabarrena–Gipuzkoa

Debabarrena–Gipuzkoa (UCI team code: DEB) was a Basque professional cycling team, which competed in elite road bicycle racing events such as the UCI Women's Road World Cup.

== National & Continental Champions ==
2008
Spain Road Race, Itxaso Leunda Coni
2010
Spain Time Trial, Leire Olaberria Dorronsoro
Spain Road Race, Leire Olaberria Dorronsoro
