= Emilie Aubry =

Swiss cyclist

Personal information
- Full name: Emilie Aubry
- Born: 16 February 1989 (age 37) Ipsach, Switzerland

Cycling career
- Sport: Cycling
- Current team: Garmin–Cervélo
- Discipline: Road

Emilie Aubry (born 16 February 1989) is a Swiss professional racing cyclist. Emilie currently rides for United Kingdom based Garmin–Cervélo. She won the Swiss National Championships 2010.

== Career highlights ==
2008
1st, GP Oberbaselbiet (SWI)
3rd, Road Race National Championships (SWI)

2009 – Cervélo TestTeam 2009 season

2010
1st in (Switzerland) Road Race National Championships
