= Cashandra Slingerland =

South African cyclist

Personal information
- Born: 8 December 1974 (age 51) South Africa

Cycling career
- Sport: Cycling
- Discipline: Road cycling

Professional team
- 2008-2009: MTN Energade Ladies Team

Cashandra Slingerland (born 8 December 1974) is a road cyclist from South Africa. In 2009, she won the time trial at the African Cycling Championships.
