= Giada Borgato =

Italian cyclist

Personal information
- Born: 15 June 1989 (age 37)

Cycling career
- Sport: Cycling
- Role: Rider

Giada Borgato (born 15 June 1989) is an Italian professional racing cyclist. She has ridden for three UCI Women's Teams; Diadora–Pasta Zara in 2012, Pasta Zara–Cogeas in 2013 and Estado de México–Faren Kuota in 2014.
