= Elena Novikova =

Woman endurance cyclist from Ukraine

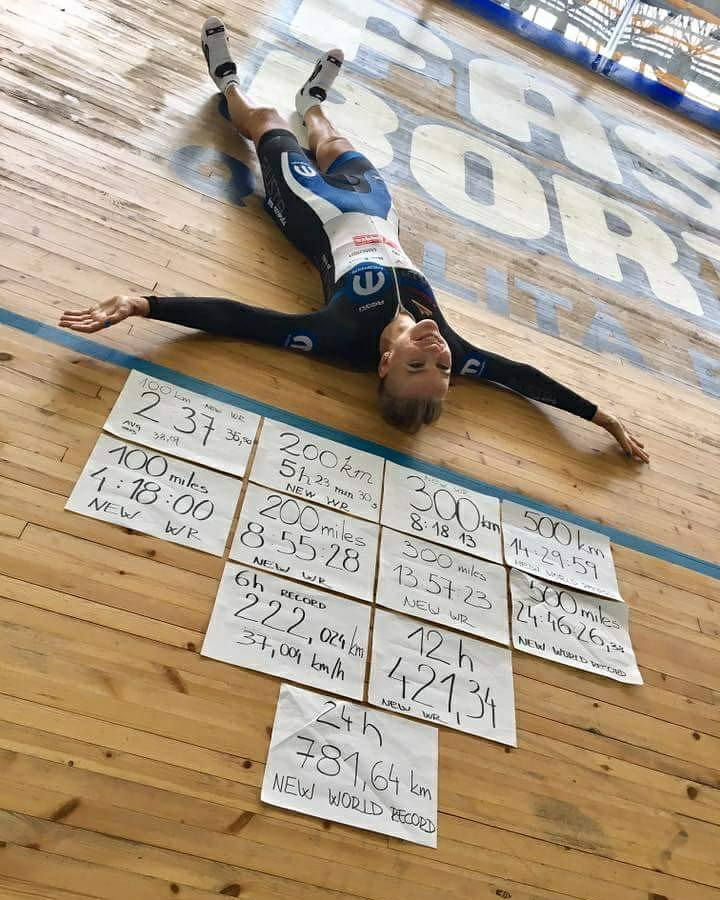
- Elena Novikova's eleven new world records

Personal information
- Nickname: Lemona
- Born: Elena Volodymyrivna Novikova (Олена Володимирівна Новікова); 14 January 1984 (age 42): Leningrad, Russian SFSR, Soviet Union; (now Saint Petersburg, Russia)
- Height: 179 cm (5 ft 10 in)
- Weight: 65 kg (143 lb)

Cycling career
- Sport: Cycling
- Disciplines: Road; Mountain bike racing
- Role: Rider
- Rider type: Endurance

Amateur teams
- 2015: TreColli–Forno d'Asolo
- 2017: Giusta Pro Records

Professional teams
- 2014: Forno d'Asolo–Astute
- 2016: Servetto Footon
- 2018: Health Mate–Cyclelive Team
- 2018–2019: Servetto–Stradalli Cycle–Alurecycling

Elena Volodymyrivna Novikova (born 14 January 1984) is a Ukrainian road cyclist, who most recently rode for UCI Women's Team Servetto–Piumate–Beltrami TSA. She represented her nation at the 2007 UCI Road World Championships and 2009 UCI Road World Championships.

She lives in Italy. She won 15 mtb and road 24 hours races in the category solo. She won 2 times 24 hours road race in Le Mans in France. Novikova won 3 times hardest in Italy mtb 24 hours solo race of Finale Ligure. In 2015, she won a title of European Champion of mtb 24 hours solo races. In 2016, she finished the second hardest mtb stage race in the World, Ironbike. In October 2015, she made a Record of Gavia mountain going up and down 9 times during 19 hours.

== Career ==
=== World records ===
On 17 September 2017 she achieved 11 world records during the successful attempt to overcome the previous 24-hour record. All these records are Indoor Track – Solo – Standard – Women 18–49.

Records are:

- 6 Hours = 222.024 Km – 137.959 Miles
- 12 Hours = 421.347 Km – 261.812 Miles
- 24 Hours = 781.638 Km – 485.687 Miles
- 100 Km = 2h 37' 35"
- 200 Km = 5h 23' 30"
- 300 Km = 8h 18' 13"
- 500 Km = 14h 29' 59"
- 100 Miles = 4h 18' 00"
- 200 Miles = 8h 55' 13"
- 300 Miles = 13h 57' 23"
- 500 Miles = 24h 46' 26"

== Personal life ==
Novikova was in a domestic relationship with Chilean politician Gaspar Rivas, who she met via Facebook during the War in Donbass in 2014.
