= Veronica Andrèasson =

Swedish cyclist

Veronica Andréasson
Personal information
- Born: 6 March 1981 (age 45) Sweden

Cycling career
- Sport: Cycling
- Discipline: Road cycling

Professional teams
- 2006: Safi-Pasta Zara-Manhattan
- 2008-2009: Bigla Cycling Team
- 2010-2011: Lotto Honda Team

Veronica Andréasson (born 6 March 1981) is a road cyclist from Sweden. She represented her nation at the 2005 and 2006 UCI Road World Championships.
