= Vicki Whitelaw =

Australian cyclist

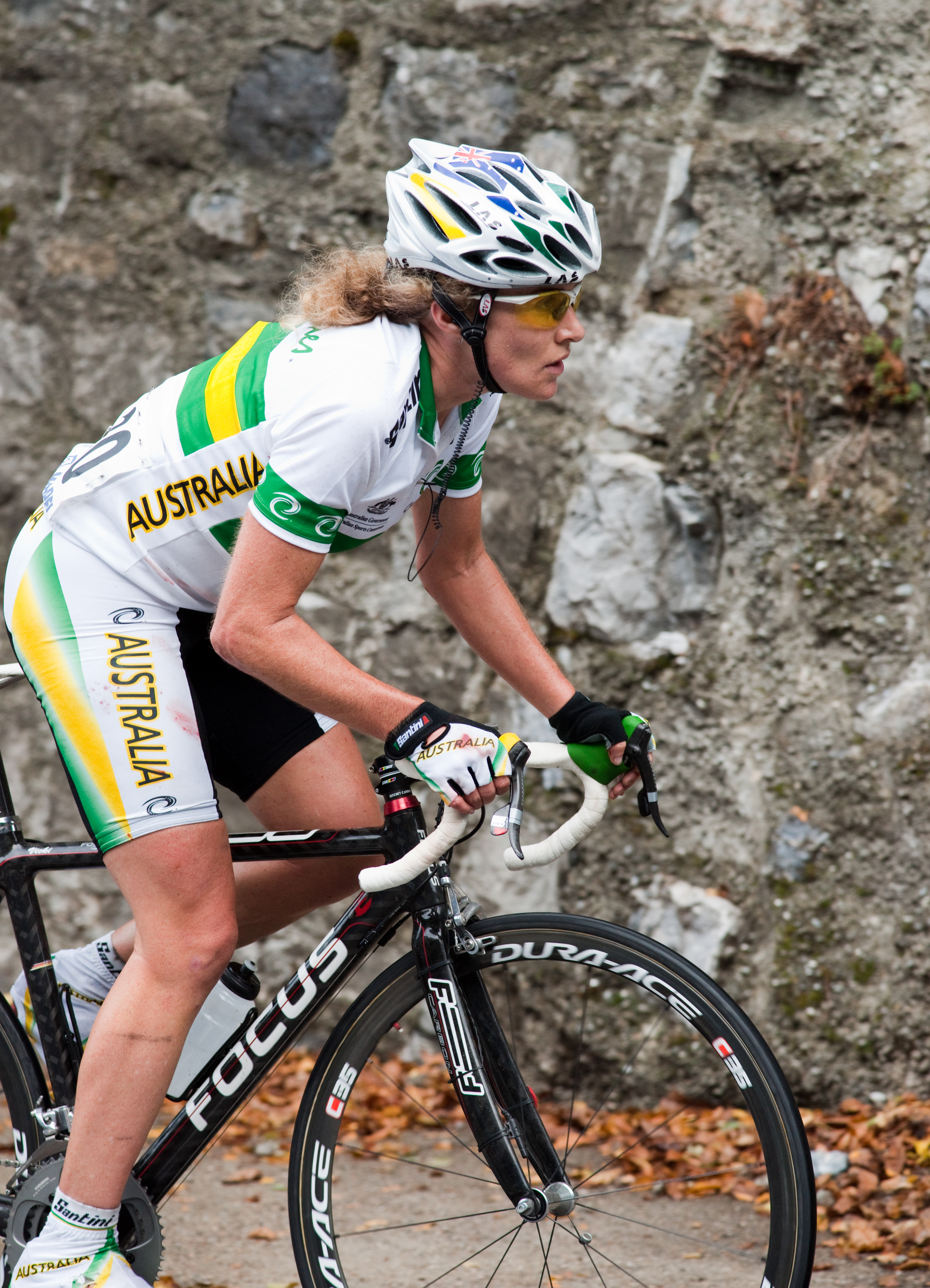
- Whitelaw at the 2009 UCI Road World Championships

Personal information
- Born: 2 January 1977 (age 49) Australia

Cycling career
- Sport: Cycling
- Discipline: Road cycling

Professional teams
- 2009: Vision 1 Racing
- 2010–2011: Lotto Honda Team

Vicki Whitelaw (born 2 January 1977) is a road cyclist from Australia. She participated at the 2008, 2009, 2010 and 2011 UCI Road World Championships.
