= Kim Schoonbaert =

Belgian cyclist

Personal information
- Born: 2 March 1986 (age 40) Belgium

Cycling career
- Sport: Cycling
- Discipline: Road cycling

Professional team
- 2007–2013: Lotto Belisol Ladiesteam

Kim Schoonbaert (born 2 March 1986) is a road cyclist from Belgium. She participated at the 2012 UCI Road World Championships in the Women's team time trial for Lotto Belisol Ladiesteam.
