= Liesbet De Vocht =

Belgian former road bicycle racer

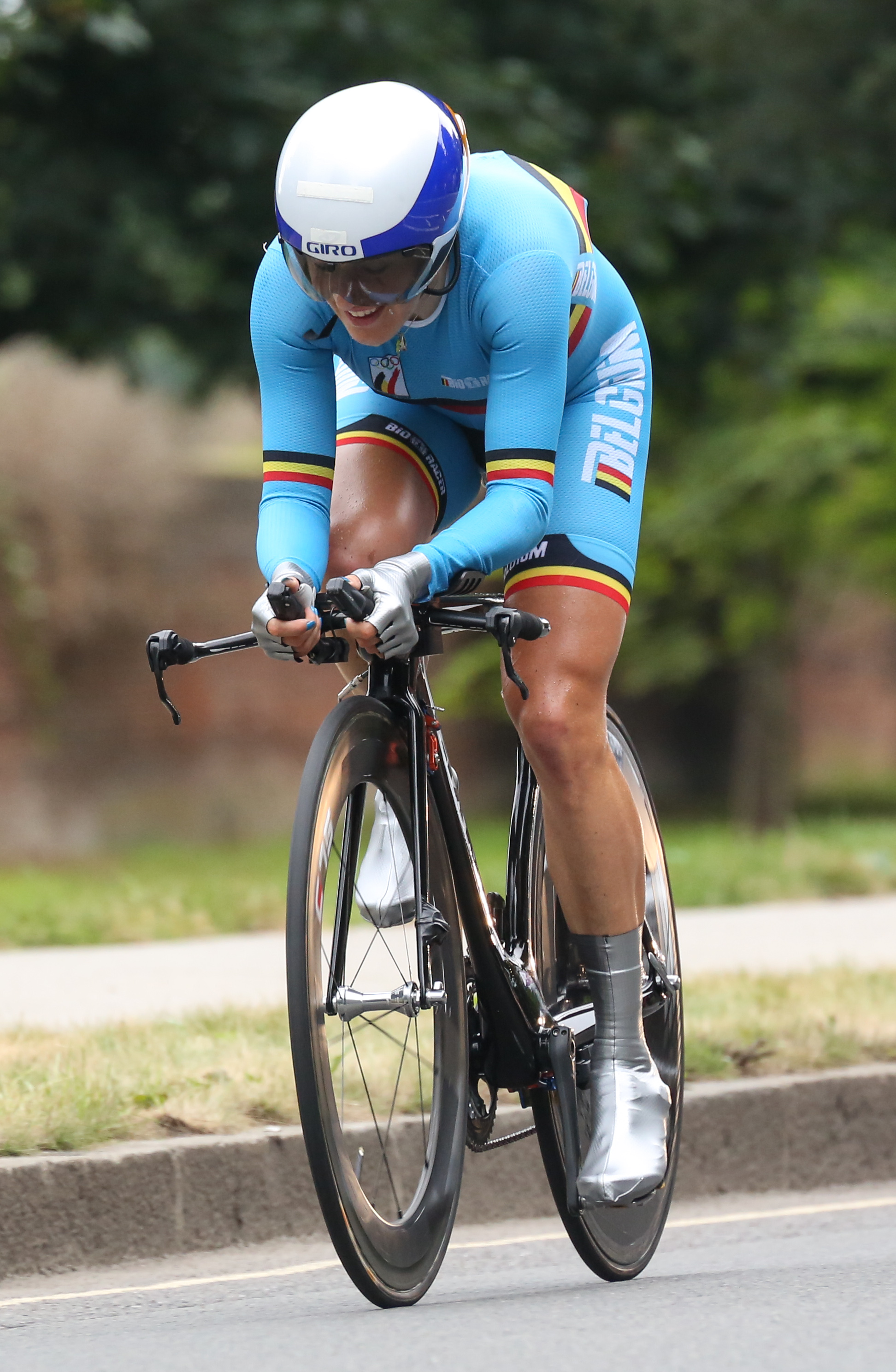
- De Vocht competing in the 2012 Olympics time trial in London

Personal information
- Full name: Liesbet De Vocht
- Born: 5 January 1979 (age 47) Turnhout, Belgium

Cycling career
- Sport: Cycling
- Current team: Lotto Belisol Ladies
- Discipline: Road
- Role: Rider

Professional teams
- 2006–2007: Lotto Belisol Ladies
- 2008: Vrienden van het Platteland
- 2009–2010: DSB Bank - Nederland bloeit
- 2011: Topsport Vlaanderen–Ridley
- 2012-2013: Rabo Women Cycling Team
- 2014: Lotto Belisol Ladies

Liesbet De Vocht (born 5 January 1979) is a Belgian former road bicycle racer. She competed at the 2012 Summer Olympics in the Women's road race, finishing 9th and in the Women's time trial and finishing 23rd in the race. She retired at the end of the 2014 season.

Her brother Wim De Vocht is also a former professional cyclist.

== Major results ==
2005
1st De Pinte Criterium
1st Olen Criterium
2006 – Lotto-Belisol Ladiesteam 2006 season
1st Ladys Berry Classics
1st Assebroek Criterium
1st Kontich Criterium
1st Antwerpen Provincial Time Trial Championships
1st overall Wolvertem-Slozen

1st stage 1A & 1B

2007
1st Antwerpen Provincial Time Trial Championships
1st Kontich Criterium
1st Olen Criterium
1st Putte-Kapellen
3rd Belgian National Road Race Championships
3rd Belgian National Time Trial Championships
2008 – Vrienden van het Platteland 2008 season
1st Omloop van het Hageland
1st De Klinge Criterium
1st Tielt-Winge Wielertrofee Vlaanderen Criterium
2nd Belgian National Time Trial Championships
3rd overall Tour de Pologne
2009 – DSB Bank-LTO 2009 season
1st Evergem Criterium
1st Bornem Criterium
1st Nieuwmoer Kalmthout Criterium
1st Antwerpen Provincial Time Trial Championships
1st Dwars door de Westhoek
1st Heusden-Zolder Wielertrofee Vlaanderen Criterium
1st Merelbeke Criterium
1st Olen Criterium
1st stage 1 Tour de Bretagne
1st Flobecq Criterium
1st Boezinge Wielertrofee Vlaanderen Criterium
1st Belgian National Time Trial Championships
3rd GP Stad Roeselare
2010
1st Dolmans Heuvelland Classic
1st Belgian National Road Race Championships
1st Ronde van Luykgestel
1st Kontich Criterium
1st Dwars door de Westhoek
1st Kapellen Criterium
1st Leeuwergem Criterium
1st Ruien Wielertrofee Vlaanderen Criterium
2nd Omloop Het Nieuwsblad
2nd Belgian National Time Trial Championships
3rd Omloop door Middag-Humsterland
2011
1st Antwerpen Provincial Time Trial Championships
1st Belsele Criterium
1st Herentals Criterium
1st Belgian National Time Trial Championships
2nd Halle-Buizingen
2nd Kasseien Omloop Exloo
3rd Sparkassen Giro Bochum
2012 – Rabobank Women Cycling Team 2012 season
1st Antwerpen Provincial Time Trial Championships
1st Knokke-Heist-Bredene
1st Gooik-Geraardsbergen-Gooik
1st Belgian National Time Trial Championships
1st Boechout Criterium
2nd overall Lotto-Decca Tour
3rd Halle-Buizingen
3rd overall Tour of Chongming Island
9th Olympic Games Road Race
2013
1st Antwerpen Provincial Time Trial Championships
1st De Pinte Criterium
1st Schellebelle Criterium
1st 's-Gravenwezel Criterium
1st Oedelem Criterium
1st Belgian National Road Race Championships
1st Watervliet Criterium
1st Zwevegem Criterium
1st RaboRonde Heerlen
2nd Borlo Chrono
2nd 7-Dorpenomloop Aalburg
2nd Kapellen Criterium
