= Carla Ryan =

Australian racing cyclist

Personal information
- Full name: Carla Ryan
- Born: 21 September 1985 (age 41) Nathalia, Victoria, Australia

Cycling career
- Sport: Cycling
- Current team: AA Drink–leontien.nl
- Discipline: Road

Professional teams
- 2008–11: Garmin–Cervélo
- 2012: AA Drink–leontien.nl
- 2013: Cyclelive Plus–Zannata
- 2014: Alé–Cipollini

Major wins
- Multiple National Champion

Carla Ryan (born 21 September 1985) is a former Australian professional racing cyclist. She was previously a distance runner before taking up cycling in 2005 as a result of a Queensland Academy of Sport talent ID programme. She has won multiple Australian National Road Race Championships.

== Career ==
2007
1st in Le Race (NZL)

2008
1st, Open de Suède Vårgårda TTT (SWE)
1st, in (Australia) Time Trial National Championships

2009 – Cervélo TestTeam 2009 season
1st, Open de Suède Vårgårda TTT (SWE)
1st, in (Australia) Road Race National Championships
1st, in (Australia) Time Trial National Championships
2nd overall, Giro del Trentino Alto Adige-Südtirol (ITA)

2010
2nd overall, Giro del Trentino Alto Adige-Südtirol
1st stage 7, Tour de l'Ardèche

2011
2nd in Road Race National Championships, Australia

2012 – AA Drink–leontien.nl 2012 season
2nd overall, Tour de Feminin – O cenu Ceského Švýcarska

2014 – Alé–Cipollini 2014 season
