= Marie Lindberg (cyclist) =

Swedish cyclist

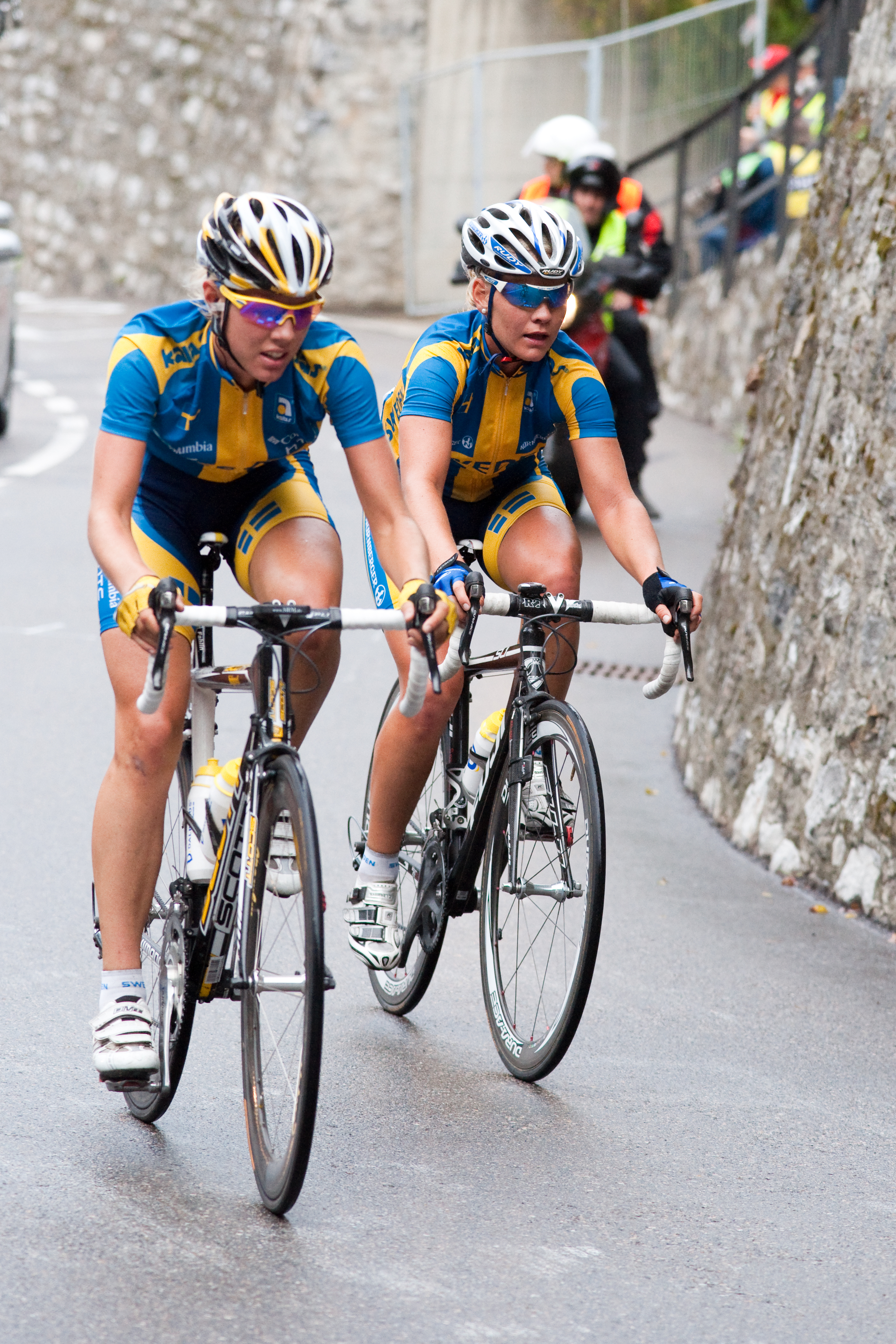
- Lindberg (right) at the 2009 UCI Road World Championships.

Personal information
- Born: 14 August 1987 (age 39) Sweden

Cycling career
- Sport: Cycling
- Discipline: Road cycling

Professional teams
- 2011: ABUS–Nutrixxion
- 2012: Kleo Ladies Team

Marie Lindberg (born 14 August 1987) is a road cyclist from Sweden. She represented her nation at the 2006, 2009, 2010 and 2011 UCI Road World Championships.
