= Kim Anderson (cyclist) =

American cyclist

Personal information
- Full name: Kimberly Anderson
- Born: January 28, 1968 (age 58) Wisconsin, United States

Cycling career
- Sport: Cycling
- Discipline: Road cycling

Professional team
- 2003–2010: Team HTC–Columbia Women

Kimberly "Kim" Anderson (born January 28, 1968) is an American road cyclist. In 2009, she won La Route de France.

She now owns a coffee roaster and cafe with her long-term partner in Santa Barbara, CA.
