= Sarah Düster =

German cyclist (born 1982)

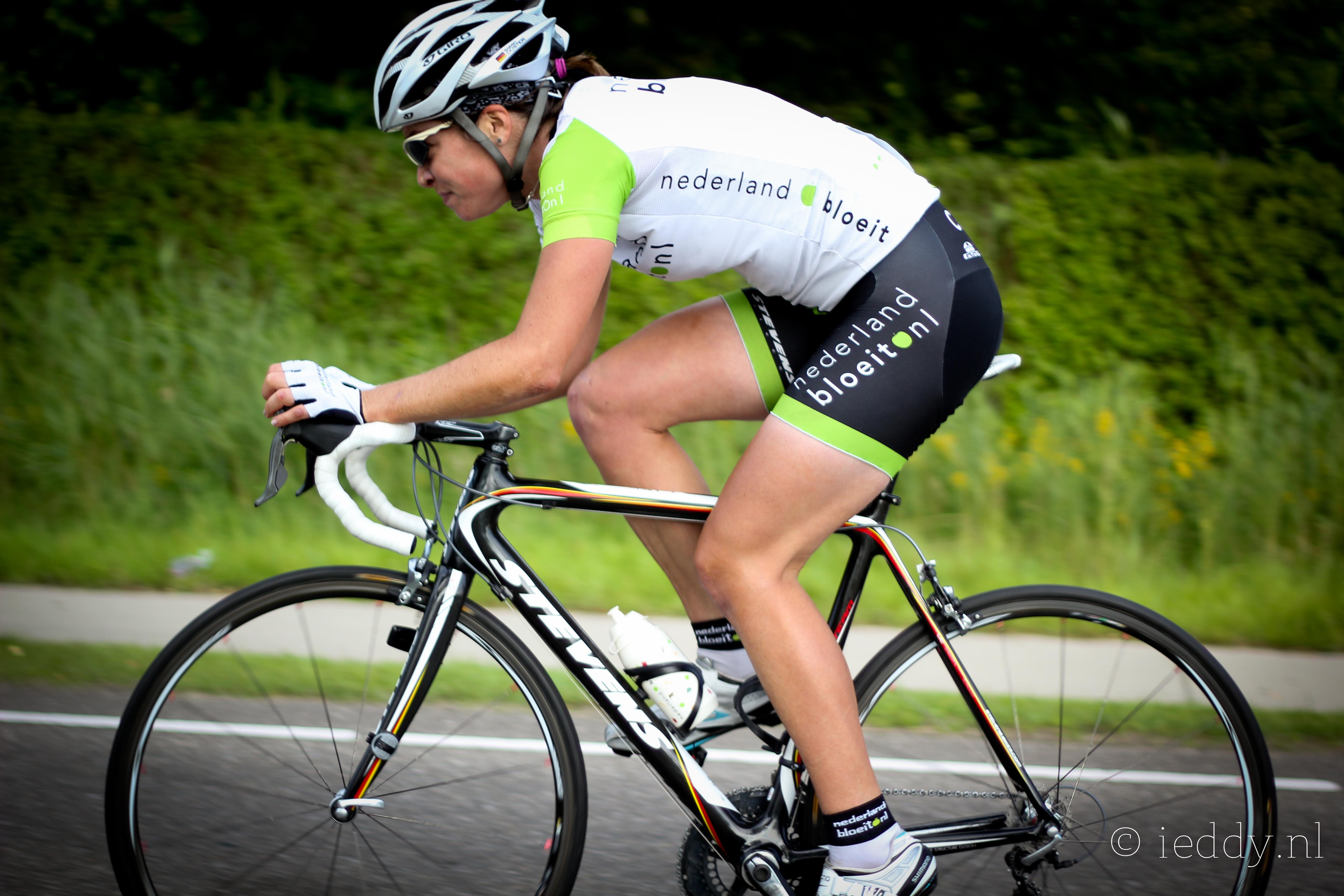
- Düster in 2011

Personal information
- Born: 10 July 1982 (age 44) Wangen im Allgäu

Cycling career
- Sport: Cycling
- Discipline: Road cycling

Professional teams
- 2008–2010: Cervelo Test Team
- 2011–2012: Rabobank Women Team

Sarah Düster (born 10 July 1982) is a road cyclist from Germany. She participated at the 2011 UCI Road World Championships.

== Major results ==
2008
3rd Overall Tour de Feminin - Krasna Lipa
8th Overall Holland Ladies Tour

2009
1st Grand Prix de Dottignies

2010
5th Omloop Het Nieuwsblad
