= 2009 Thüringen Rundfahrt der Frauen =

Race details
- Dates: 21–26 July 2009
- Stages: 6
- Distance: 586.7 km (364.6 mi)
- Winning time: 16h 18' 47"

Results
	Winner	Linda Villumsen (NZL)	(Team Columbia–High Road Women)
	Second	Marianne Vos (NED)	(DSB Bank–LTO)
	Third	Susanne Ljungskog (SWE)	(Team Flexpoint)
	Points	Marianne Vos (NED)	(DSB Bank–LTO)
	Mountains	Tina Liebig (GER)	(DSB Bank–LTO)
	Young rider	Marianne Vos (NED)	(DSB Bank–LTO)

The 2009 Thüringen Rundfahrt der Frauen was the 22nd edition of the Thüringen Rundfahrt der Frauen, a women's cycling stage race in Germany. It was rated by the Union Cycliste Internationale (UCI) as a category 2.1 race and was held between 21 and 26 July 2009.

== Stages ==
=== Stage 1 ===
21 July 2009 – Altenburg to Altenburg, 78.0 km (48.5 mi)

Stage 1 result

	Rider	Team	Time
1	Marianne Vos (NED)	DSB Bank–LTO	1h 59' 34"
2	Emma Johansson (SWE)	Red Sun Cycling Team	s.t.
3	Rasa Leleivytė (LTU)	Safi–Pasta Zara–Titanedi	s.t.
4	Ellen van Dijk (NED)	Team Columbia–High Road Women	s.t.
5	Sarah Düster (GER)	Cervélo Test Team	s.t.

General Classification after Stage 1

	Rider	Team	Time
1	Marianne Vos (NED)	DSB Bank–LTO	1h 59' 22"
2	Emma Johansson (SWE)	Red Sun Cycling Team	+6"
3	Rasa Leleivytė (LTU)	Safi–Pasta Zara–Titanedi	+7"
4	Ellen van Dijk (NED)	Team Columbia–High Road Women	+8"
5	Sarah Düster (GER)	Cervélo Test Team	+12"

=== Stage 2 ===
22 July 2009 – Gera to Gera, 129.9 km (80.7 mi)

Stage 2 result

	Rider	Team	Time
1	Charlotte Becker (GER)	Equipe Nürnberger Versicherung	3h 28' 54"
2	Luisa Tamanini (ITA)	Selle Italia–Ghezzi	s.t.
3	Marianne Vos (NED)	DSB Bank–LTO	+46"
4	Andrea Bosman (NED)	Netherlands national team	+47"
5	Rasa Leleivytė (LTU)	Safi–Pasta Zara–Titanedi	+47"

General Classification after Stage 2

	Rider	Team	Time
1	Luisa Tamanini (ITA)	Selle Italia–Ghezzi	5h 28' 29"
2	Charlotte Becker (GER)	Equipe Nürnberger Versicherung	+2"
3	Marianne Vos (NED)	DSB Bank–LTO	+23"
4	Sarah Düster (GER)	Cervélo Test Team	+38"
5	Emma Johansson (SWE)	Red Sun Cycling Team	+40"

=== Stage 3 ===
23 July 2009 – Schleiz to Schleiz, 125.2 km (77.8 mi)

Stage 3 result

	Rider	Team	Time
1	Linda Villumsen (NZL)	Team Columbia–High Road Women	3h 34' 43"
2	Sarah Düster (GER)	Cervélo Test Team	+1' 22"
3	Eva Lechner (ITA)	Gauss RDZ Ormu–Colnago	+1' 36"
4	Vicki Whitelaw (AUS)	Vision 1 Racing	+1' 36"
5	Rasa Leleivytė (LTU)	Safi–Pasta Zara–Titanedi	+1' 36"

General Classification after Stage 3

	Rider	Team	Time
1	Linda Villumsen (NZL)	Team Columbia–High Road Women	9h 03' 50"
2	Sarah Düster (GER)	Cervélo Test Team	+1' 14"
3	Marianne Vos (NED)	DSB Bank–LTO	+1' 17"
4	Emma Johansson (SWE)	Red Sun Cycling Team	+1' 38"
5	Rasa Leleivytė (LTU)	Safi–Pasta Zara–Titanedi	+1' 40"

=== Stage 4 ===
24 July 2009 – Triebes to Triebes (individual time trial), 23.1 km (14.4 mi)

Stage 4 result

	Rider	Team	Time
1	Christiane Soeder (AUT)	Cervélo Test Team	34' 10"
2	Trixi Worrack (GER)	Equipe Nürnberger Versicherung	+5"
3	Marianne Vos (NED)	DSB Bank–LTO	+35"
4	Susanne Ljungskog (SWE)	Vision 1 Racing	+52"
5	Linda Villumsen (NZL)	Team Columbia–High Road Women	+59"

General Classification after Stage 4

	Rider	Team	Time
1	Linda Villumsen (NZL)	Team Columbia–High Road Women	9h 38' 59"
2	Trixi Worrack (GER)	Equipe Nürnberger Versicherung	+53"
3	Marianne Vos (NED)	DSB Bank–LTO	+53"
4	Christiane Soeder (AUT)	Cervélo Test Team	+1' 12"
5	Susanne Ljungskog (SWE)	Vision 1 Racing	+1' 49"

=== Stage 5 ===
25 July 2009 – Schmölln to Schmölln, 114.5 km (71.1 mi)

Stage 5 result

	Rider	Team	Time
1	Emma Johansson (SWE)	Red Sun Cycling Team	3h 09' 17"
2	Susanne Ljungskog (SWE)	Vision 1 Racing	+2"
3	Sarah Düster (GER)	Cervélo Test Team	+30"
4	Marianne Vos (NED)	DSB Bank–LTO	+54"
5	Trixi Worrack (GER)	Equipe Nürnberger Versicherung	+57"

General Classification after Stage 5

	Rider	Team	Time
1	Linda Villumsen (NZL)	Team Columbia–High Road Women	12h 49' 21"
2	Marianne Vos (NED)	DSB Bank–LTO	+33"
3	Susanne Ljungskog (SWE)	Vision 1 Racing	+40"
4	Trixi Worrack (GER)	Equipe Nürnberger Versicherung	+45"
5	Emma Johansson (SWE)	Red Sun Cycling Team	+1' 22"

=== Stage 6 ===
26 July 2009 – Greiz to Greiz, 116 km (72.1 mi)

Stage 6 result

	Rider	Team	Time
1	Fabiana Luperini (ITA)	Fabiana Selle Italia	3h 23' 59"
2	Monica Holler (SWE)	Bigla Cycling Team	+9"
3	Petra Dijkman (NED)	Red Sun Cycling Team	+17"
4	Charlotte Becker (GER)	Equipe Nürnberger Versicherung	+38"
5	Karin Thürig (SUI)	Bigla Cycling Team	+42"

General Classification after Stage 6

	Rider	Team	Time
1	Linda Villumsen (NZL)	Team Columbia–High Road Women	16h 18' 47"
2	Marianne Vos (NED)	DSB Bank–LTO	+33"
3	Susanne Ljungskog (SWE)	Vision 1 Racing	+40"
4	Trixi Worrack (GER)	Equipe Nürnberger Versicherung	+48"
5	Emma Johansson (SWE)	Red Sun Cycling Team	+1' 22"

== Final classification ==
	Rider	Team	Time
1	Linda Villumsen (NZL)	Team Columbia–High Road Women	16h 18' 47"
2	Marianne Vos (NED)	DSB Bank–LTO	+33"
3	Susanne Ljungskog (SWE)	Team Flexpoint	+40"
4	Trixi Worrack (GER)	Equipe Nürnberger Versicherung	+48"
5	Emma Johansson (SWE)	Red Sun Cycling Team	+1' 22"
6	Sarah Düster (GER)	Cervélo Test Team	+1' 34"
7	Petra Dijkman (NED)	Red Sun Cycling Team	+2' 02"
8	Nicole Brändli (SUI)	Bigla Cycling Team	+2' 29"
9	Christiane Soeder (AUT)	Cervélo Test Team	+2' 45"
10	Vicki Whitelaw (AUS)	Vision 1 Racing	+3' 35"

== See also ==
- 2009 in women's road cycling
