= Zeulenroda unt Bf station =

Railway station in Zeulenroda-Triebes, Germany

Zeulenroda unt Bf
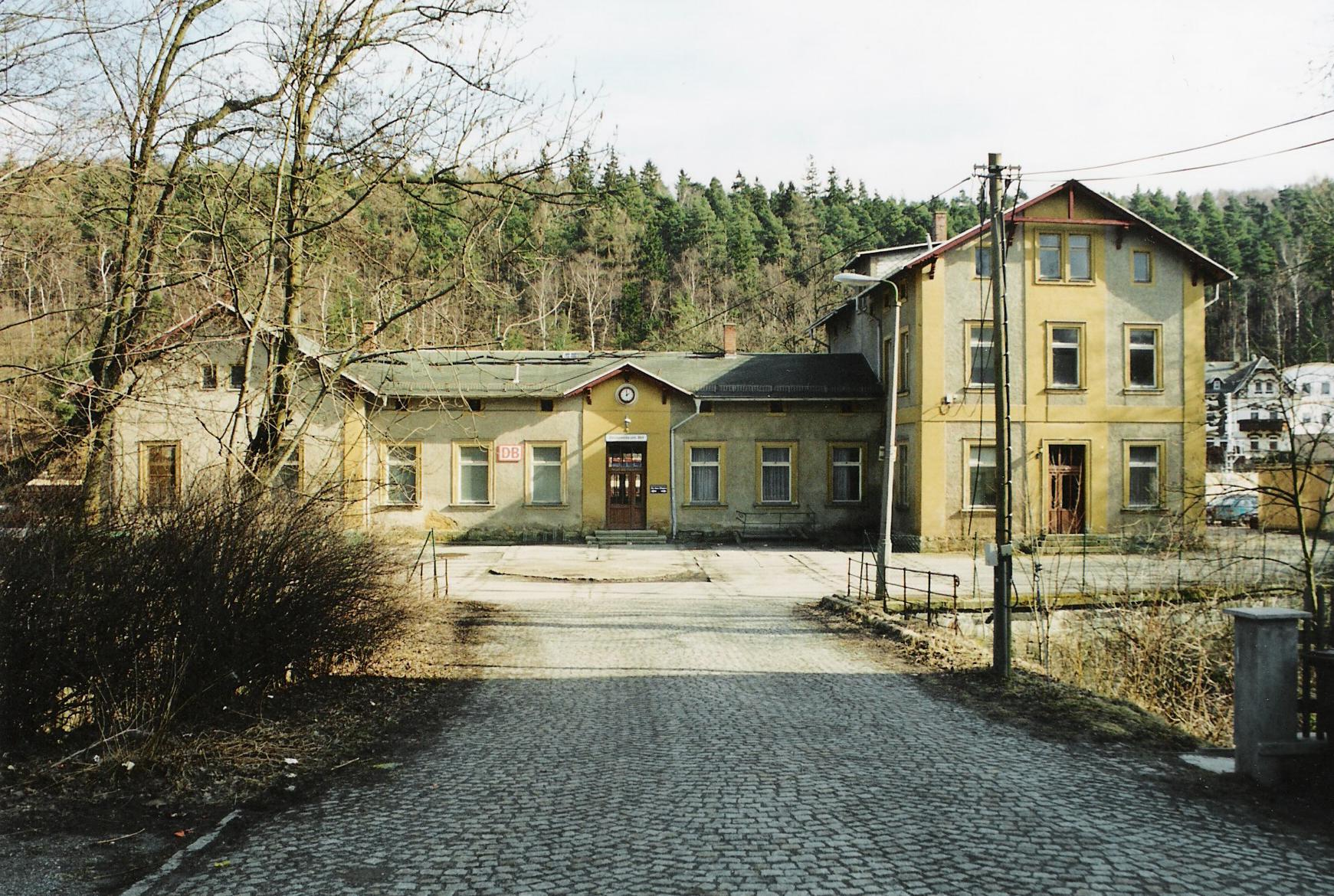
- Zeulenroda entrance building (2010, deteriorated)

General information
- Location: Unterer Bahnhof, Zeulenroda, Zeulenroda-Triebes, Thuringia; Germany
- Coordinates: 50°39′34″N 12°00′41″E
- Lines: Werdau–Mehltheuer (km 49.74); former Zeulenroda unt Bf–ob Bf (km 0.00)
- Platforms: 2

Construction
- Accessible: Yes

Other information
- Station code: 7009
- DS100 code: UZU
- IBNR: 8013396
- Category: 6
- Website: www.bahnhof.de

History
- Opened: 1883

Services
Preceding station		Following station
Mehltheuer towards Hof Hbf	RB 13	Triebes towards Leipzig Hbf
Location
- Location within Thuringia Location within Germany Location within Europe

Zeulenroda unt Bf (Zeulenroda lower station) is a station in Zeulenroda-Triebes on the Werdau–Mehltheuer railway in the German state of Thuringia. In addition to the now disused upper station (Zeulenroda oberen Bahnhof), the town also includes the halt (Haltepunkt) of Triebes.

== History ==
The station was opened as Zeulenroda station on 15 November 1883 together with the Werdau–Weida–Mehltheuer railway. It is located in the Zeulenroda district of Untere Haardt. The town railway (Stadtbahn) to central Zeulenroda was opened on 1 September 1914. So there were two stations in Zeulenroda. The former station was renamed Zeulenroda unt Bf (short for unterer bahnhof, lower station), the new station near the town centre was given the name on Zeulenroda ob Bf (short for oberer bahnhof, upper station).

Passenger services on the town railway stopped on 1 June 1975, although they resumed in May 1993, before being finally closed on 2 June 1996. A year later, on 31 October 1997, freight traffic also ended on the town railway, so that Zeulenroda unt Bf again operated as a through station.

Although the station is located in Thuringia, the lines were built by the Royal Saxon State Railways (Königlich Sächsische Staatseisenbahnen), so that the brick buildings were built in the typical style of Saxony. The station was equipped with three platforms, a two-storey entrance building with a one-storey annex, a goods shed and head and side loading ramps. Two loading roads were also available for freight transport.

The water loading facility was demolished in 1986. Colour-light signals and a signal box built with Soviet EZMG technology were installed In 1987. The freight shed was demolished in 1996.

The municipality acquired the station building for €25,000 in 2008. Reconstruction of the station, including the demolition of the entrance building, began in 2010.

== Platforms ==
Platform lengths and heights are as follows:

Platforms	Length in m	Height in cm
1	120	55
2	100	32
