= Werdau–Mehltheuer railway =

Railway line in Germany

Overview
- Line number: 6652; 6653
- Locale: Saxony and Thuringia, Germany

Service
- Route number: 546

Technical
- Line length: 67.65 km (42.04 mi)
- Number of tracks: 1, 2nd track dismantled after the Second World War
- Track gauge: 1,435 mm (4 ft 8 1/2 in) standard gauge
- Minimum radius: 246 m (807 ft)
- Operating speed: 80 km/h (49.7 mph) (maximum)
- Maximum incline: 1.4%

The Werdau–Mehltheuer railway is a branch line in the German states of Saxony and Thuringia, originally built and operated by the Royal Saxon State Railways (Königlich Sächsische Staatseisenbahnen). The section from Werdau to Weida via Wünschendorf is now closed. The section between Weida and Mehltheuer is part of the Gera–Hof link.

== History ==
The Werdau–Wünschendorf–Weida section was opened by the Saxon State Railways on 29 August 1876.

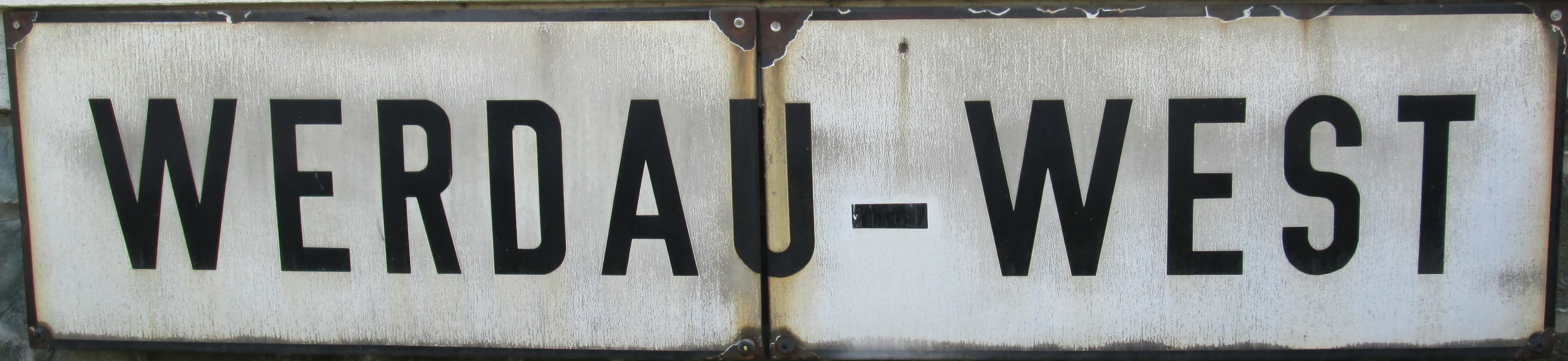
Werdau-West railway sign

The building of the section of line to Mehltheuer, which is now part of the community of Rosenbach/Vogtl., had a complex history: the first plans were developed in 1864, including a planned extension of the Weißenfels–Zeitz–Gera railway, which had been opened by the Thuringian Railway Company (Thüringische Eisenbahn-Gesellschaft) in 1859, failed due to the resistance of Bavaria. The Mehltheuer-Weida Railway Company (Mehltheuer-Weidaer Eisenbahn-Gesellschaft, MWE) was established in Plauen in 1872 with the aim of constructing a railway line which would be shorter than the existing state railway link from Leipzig via Plauen to Hof and Cheb (then called Eger). The line would branch from the Gera–Saalfeld railway of the Thuringian Railway in Weida station, which was located in the Grand Duchy of Saxe-Weimar-Eisenach, and run to the south through the territory of the Principality of the Reuss Junior Line via Hohenleuben and Triebes to Zeulenroda lower station (Zeulenroda unt Bf), which was located in the Principality of the Reuss Elder Line. It would eventually reach the Saxon Vogtland in Pausa and after 35 kilometres it would end in Mehltheuer, where it would connect with the state railway between Leipzig and Hof. Treaties were concluded between the four participating governments and the corresponding concessions were granted.

Financial problems developed when construction started. The handing over of the project to the Eisenbahnkönig ("railway king") Strousberg also did not assist development. The MWE became bankrupt in 1876 and was acquired by the Saxon State Railways. It downgraded the line to a secondary railway and opened the line from Weida Altstadt to Mehltheuer on 15 November 1883. The Weida–Weida Altstadt section followed on 1884.

The line was later converted to two tracks and upgraded to a main line in places, between Triebes and Zeulenroda in 1913 and over parts of the whole Werdau–Weida–Mehltheuer line in the 1930s, for example between Loitsch-Hohenleuben and Triebes. In the process, the two signal boxes in Loitsch-Hohenleuben and the northern signal box in Triebes were rebuilt in the 1930s.

=== Since 1945 ===
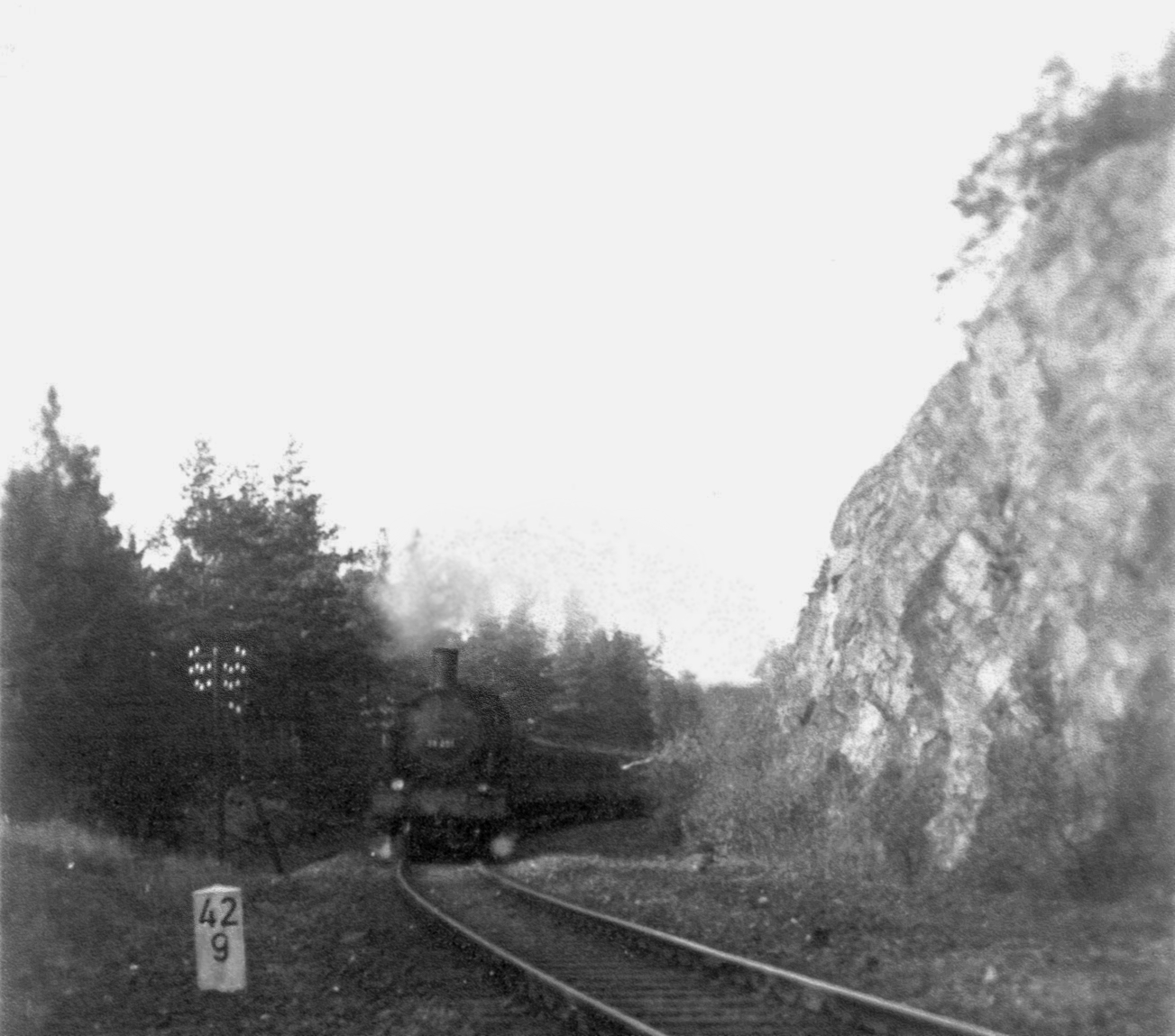
Passenger train at the red rocks near Hohenleuben (1953); the dismantled second track was located on the side near the rocks.

There was only limited damage to the line as a result of the war, but the bridge over the White Elster near Wünschendorf was blown up. As part of reparations to the Soviet Union, the second track was removed after 1945 and the line is still single-track and unelectrified. In the first post-war years, the timetable was very thin: the timetable of 1947 had only three train pairs between Wünschendorf and Zeulenroda on workdays, but on the other two sections there were four. There were two pairs of through trains (one on Sundays and holidays) with a journey time of about 3 hours 30 minutes.

From 1953 until its closure before 1962, a rail link ran from Katzendorf to Teichwolframsdorf and from there to the sächsischen Aufbereitungsbetrieben (Saxon processing operations), which was used by uranium ore trains running as block trains or in groups of wagons. The loading of uranium ore mined in the open-cast mine of Culmitzsch began in 1957 and the transport of ore to Lengenfeld, Dresden-Gittersee, Tannenbergsthal and Crossen bei Zwickau for further processing began. A 2.2 km-long connection from Gauern to the Culmitzsch loading yard was opened on 11 September 1958; it was closed in 1966. When the Neue Fabrik ("new factory") processing plant (AB 102) in Seelingstädt was opened in 1960, the Culmitz ore traffic was transferred from Seelingstädt station to the processing plant via the Taigakurve (Taiga curve).

Since the second track of the adjacent main line, the Leipzig–Hof railway, had also been dismantled for reparations, diverted traffic ran over the Mehltheuer–Weida line, some continuing to Werdau, until the 1970s. This included, for example, the D 145 service between Munich and Dresden in 1967. In the 1970s, the D 308/309 service from Berlin to Munich was still scheduled to run over the Weida–Mehltheuer section and in the 1980s during construction work on the main lines to Probstzella and Gutenfürst, a Transitzug (transit train, running non-stop between West Germany and West Berlin), which was not shown in the timetable, still ran over the line. The 1988/89 timetable listed only a through coach, running each way between Zwickau and Bad Salzungen via Wünschendorf and Gera on Saturdays. Freight operations on the line—in addition to a local freight shuttle running several times a day on the Gera–Mehltheuer–Gera route—consisted of traffic running to Seddin, partly under the brand of Trans-Europ-Express-Marchandises (a system of cross-border freight trains modelled on Trans Europ Express), and empty tank wagons.

From 1995 to 1999, a pair of InterRegio trains ran betweene Gera and Karlsruhe using the Weida–Mehltheuer section, giving the line a long-distance service for a short time again. The train stopped in Weida and Zeulenroda, but not in Mehltheuer. InterRegio trains were occasionally detoured over the Wünschendorf–Werdau section when the Gera–Gößnitz–Glauchau main line, or parts of it, were blocked because of construction work.

The Federal Railway Authority (Eisenbahn-Bundesamt; EBA) approved the closure of the Wünschendorf–Weida section on 1 May 1997; freight traffic had already ended on 31 January 1996 and passenger services ended on 2 June of the same year. Thus, the line was no longer used. Deutsche Bahn submitted a request to the Federal Railway Authority to be permitted to dismantle the tracks on this section (km 28.5 to 31.9) on 18 July 2012.

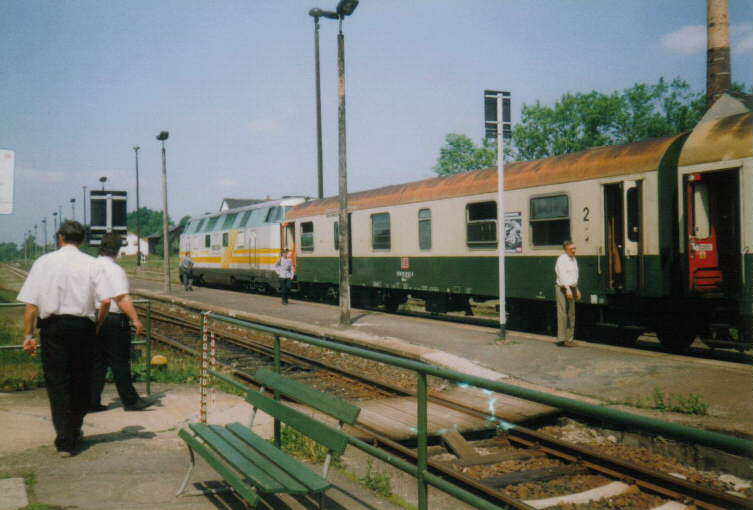
The last day at Seelingstädt station (Wünschendorf–Werdau line) on 29 May 1999

A Regional-Express service running on the Gera–Zwickau route was introduced in 1998 on the Wünschendorf–Werdau section at four-hour intervals, stopping only at Seelingstädt, Teichwolframsdorf and Werdau West. Class 219 locomotives were used, which were clearly underused in hauling only two UIC-Z cars.

Even before the introduction of this Regional-Express service, the timetable on the Zwickau–Werdau–Wünschendorf–Gera route had been thinned, so that the still operating trains were lightly used because of their poor times and lack of stops. No services ran on Sundays in the 1998/99 timetable, favouring the use of cars. This approach improved the case for closing passenger services, which ultimately occurred. An already prepared and begun project for the repair of sections of the line between the stations of Werdau-West, Langenbernsdorf and Teichwolframsdorf was cancelled and not completed, requiring speed restrictions (in places as low as 10 km/h) and leading to further reductions in railway traffic. Deutsche Bahn economised on safety and personnel in the 1998/99 timetable year.

Lack of demand and poor track quality led to the abandonment of Deutsche Bahn's "slowest" Regional-Expresses on 30 May 1999, including all services on this section of line. The closure of the section was approved by the EBA on 15 November 2000. Since then there have been several initiatives for its re-commissioning, but they have been unsuccessful. Since no overpass was installed over the disused line during the construction of the Werdau bypass, the line is now also interrupted between Werdau West and Werdau. In addition, the flying junction that had been built over the Leipzig–Hof railway in Werdau was demolished. The section between Seelingstädt and Gauern, which had been converted into a branch line from Seelingstädt station, was also officially closed. A customer was still served in Gauern by Wismut-Eisenbahn until 2003. In June 2007, Deutsche Regionaleisenbahn (DRE) leased the line from Deutsche Bahn AG and handed operations of it over to the "Friedrich List" association in Zwickau, which promotes railways, so that the latter could arrange for train operations between Werdau West and Wünschendorf/Elster to be resumed.

==== Developments after the closure of the Werdau–Wünschendorf/Elster line ====
After the closure of the Wünschendorf/Elster–Werdau/West section, the Werdauer Waldeisenbahn (Waldau Forest Railway) project was developed. This section of line has been gradually rehabilitated by a railway association since 2007. At the beginning of September 2007, the company resumed operations with a historic handcar operation between Teichwolframsdorf and Langenbernsdorf. In May 2010, five handcar operations were scheduled on the Werdau/West–Langenbernsdorf–Teichwolframsdorf route and in reverse on four weekends. This alternative, offered as an interim solution, has promoted the development of the Werdauer Waldeisenbahn and associated tourism in the region. Since 2012, a steam train service has also been occasionally integrated into the rail operations.

After the Weida–Mehltheuer line was operated by Vogtlandbahn from 2000 to 2003, passenger services were operated from June 2012 by DB Regio trains. In 2006, Regionalbahn 103 services ran on the Gera–Mehltheuer route at two hour intervals, stopping at all stations, but in some cases only on request. In addition, Regional-Express (RE) 12 services ran on the Leipzig–Gera–Hof (–Munich) route every four hours until December 2006. Because the service ran from Saxony through Saxony-Anhalt and Thuringia to Bavaria, this line was also called the Vier-Länder-Express ("four states express"). In between the RE services, Regionalbahn (RB) 103 services run between Gera and Zeulenroda, some of which connect directly with Regionalbahn 51 services running between Leipzig and Weida. Trains have not stopped at Pöllwitz and Bernsgrün since the timetable change on 11 December 2011. At this time, the timetable for Monday to Friday on the section from Weida to Zeulenroda included ten more pairs of Regionalbahn services and four pairs of Regional-Express services on the whole route, two of them continuing through Hof to Regensburg.

On 10 June 2012, Erfurter Bahn (EB) took over all the services in local rail transport and now operates all services as the EBx 13 service (Erfurter Bahn Express). While passenger services passed through Pöllwitz without stopping, the stop in Schüptitz was reintroduced after public protests. The timetable now contains a maximum of ten trains a day, of which some continue through Zeulenroda to Hof and some run to or from Leipzig.

On 3 August 2012, DB Netz's south-eastern regional branch sought approval from the Federal Railway Authority for the dismantling of the Werdau West–Mehltheuer line (6653) from rail-km 28.500 to 31.900 in the Gemarkung of Wünschdorf/Elster and the Gemarkung of Veitsberg, district of Greiz. The planned dismantling would be between the stations of Wünschendorf/Elster and Weida.

In the course of an ongoing modernisation of the route and the installation of electronic interlockings, crossing loops were only retained in the stations of Loitsch-Hohenleuben and Zeulenroda unt Bf. Pöllwitz station was closed.

== Route description ==
=== Course ===
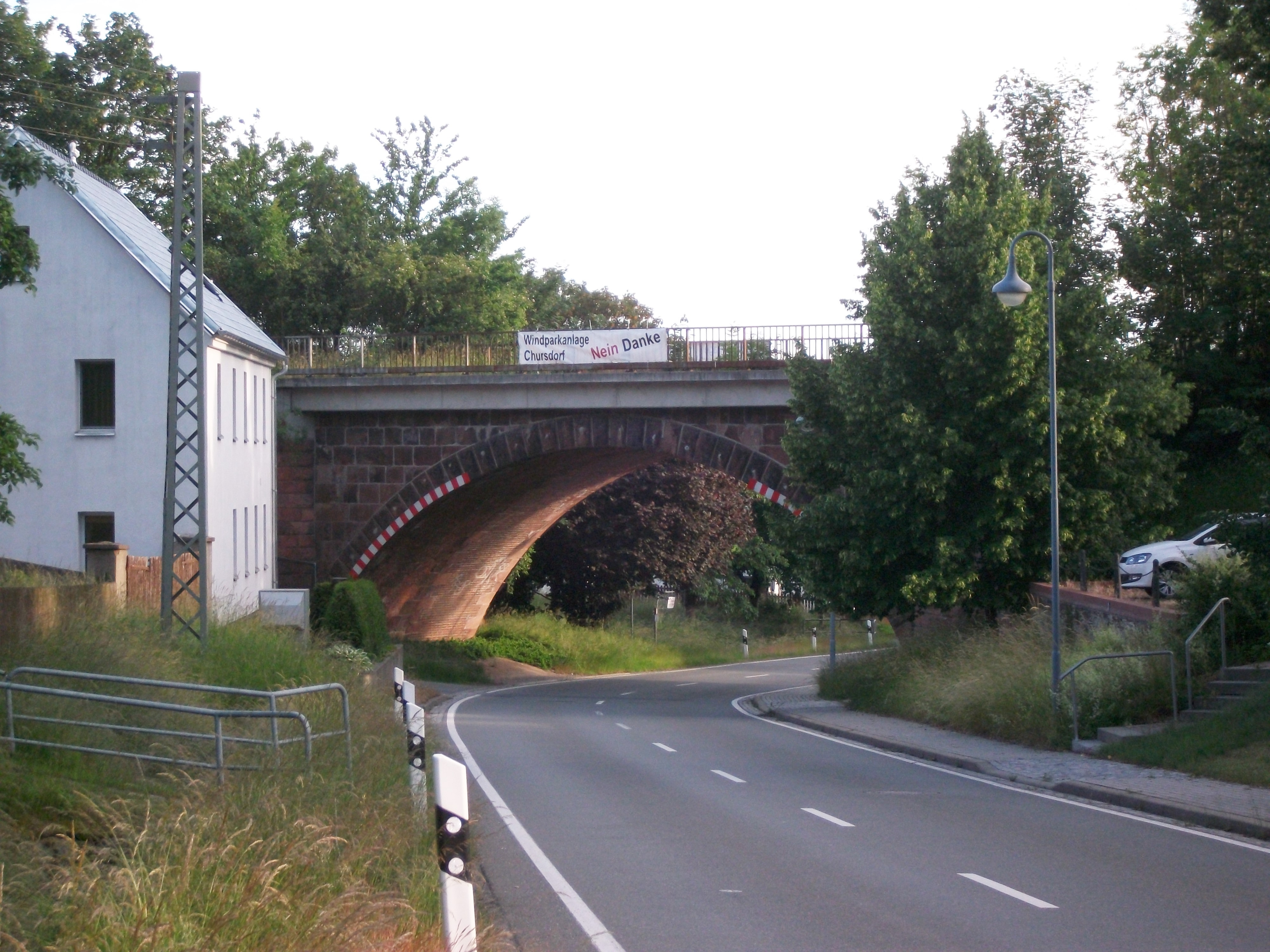
Chursdorf, rail viaduct (2016)

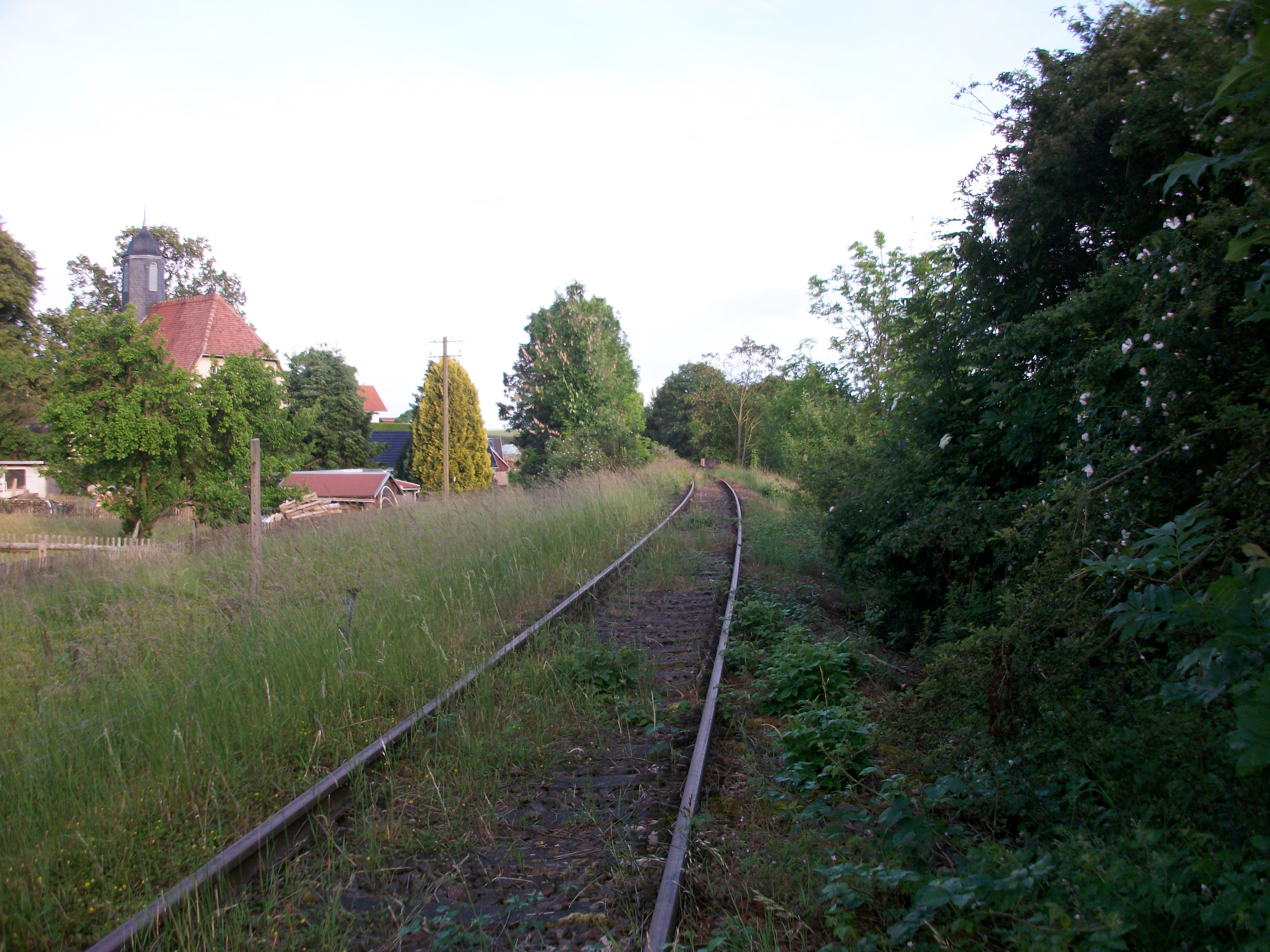
Railway line in Chursdorf (2016)

About two-thirds of the Werdau–Weida section is located in Thuringia. From 1900, it left Werdau station to the north-west and then ran through the Werdau Forest (Werdauer Wald). Until 1900 the line exited to the south-west and took a shorter route. Before the halt at Trünzig, the line leaves the Werdau Forest, crosses over federal road 175 (B 175) in Chursdorf and leaves Gauern running in the valley of the Fuchsbach. South of Wünschendorf/Elster, it swings into the valley of the Elster, where it meets the Elster Valley Railway. After Wünschendorf, it crosses the Elster after crossing the Elster Valley Railway and ends at Weida station.

The Weida–Mehltheuer section is largely located in the Thuringian region and only the stations of Pausa and Mehltheuer are in Saxony. After crossing the B 175, the line branches from the Gera–Saalfeld line and runs along the edge of Weida's old town. It then follow the Weida river to Schüptitz and continues to the south along the Triebes. From Zeulenroda, it climbs to the heights of the Vogtland and, shortly before Mehltheuer station, it reaches the highest point of the line at 512 metres above sea level. The line crosses federal highway 94 in Zeulenroda and federal highway 282 in Mehltheuer.

Because of the change in the approach to Werdau station in 1900, which increased the distance, the marked distance in kilometres (chainage) at the start of the line at Werdau changed from 0.00 to −0.182.

=== Stations ===
Werdau (50°43′39″N 12°22′02″E)

The station, which opened with the Leipzig–Hof railway in 1845, was originally far from the centre of the town, but Werdau slowly grew towards the station over the following decades. The station was only extended piecemeal in the following decades, but the station was no longer adequate for the growth of traffic after the opening of the Werdau–Weida–Mehltheuer railway. Thus it was completely rebuilt in 1900 at a cost of about 1.5 million marks. Nevertheless, the facilities were again too small in the 1920s, since any expansion on the site was almost impossible, and, as a result, a new marshalling yard was built in Zwickau. At the end of the 1990s, the station was almost completely rebuilt and the facilities of the former locomotive depot were also completely demolished.

After the abandonment of traffic on the Werdau–Wünschendorf (Elster) section on 30 May 1999, the Werdau bypass was built parallel with the Leipzig–Hof railway, cutting the line between Werdau and Werdau West. In addition, the flying junction with the Saxon-Bavarian Railway in Werdau was removed.

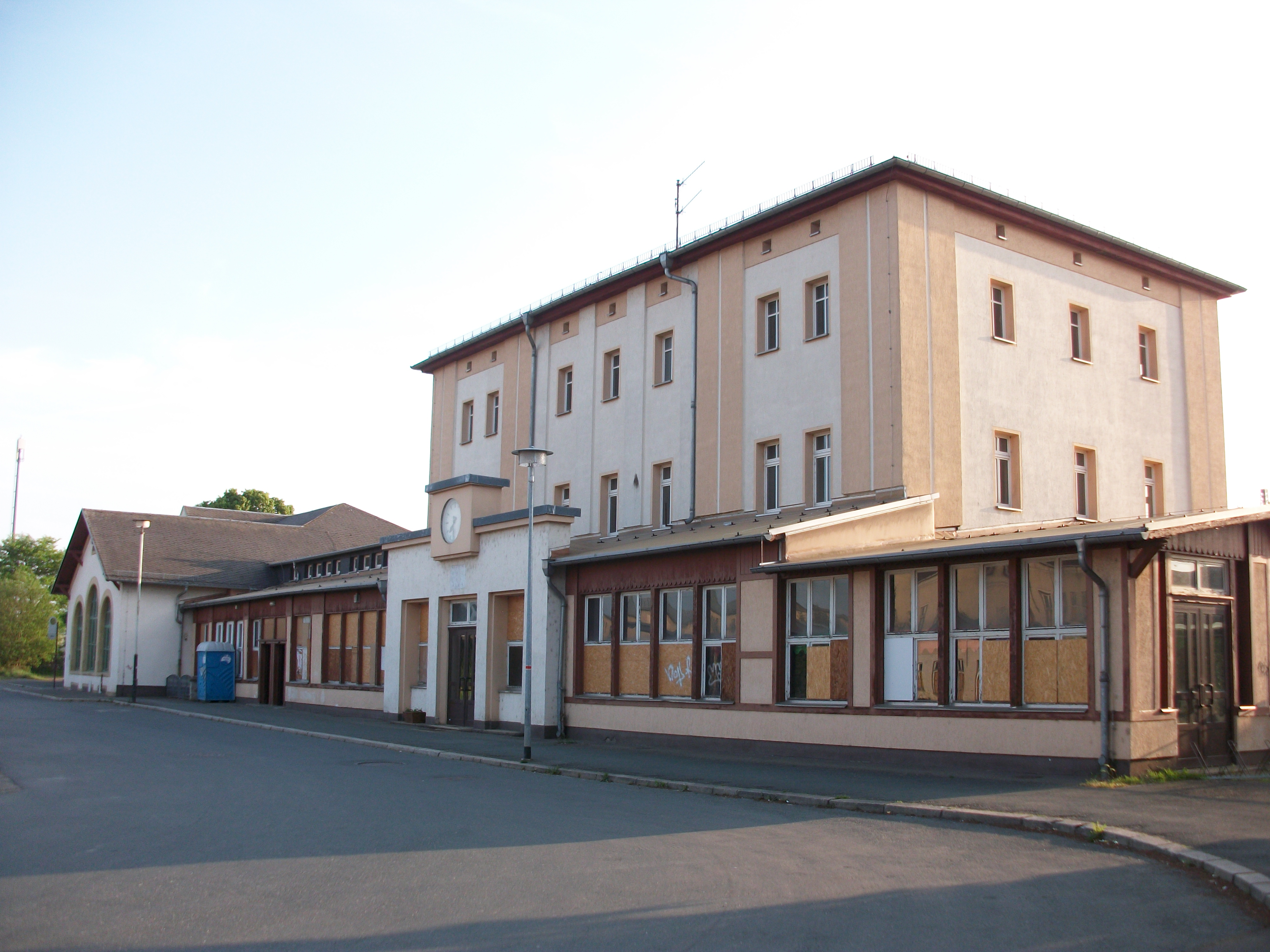
Werdau station, entrance building (2016)

Werdau station with S-Bahn service (2016)

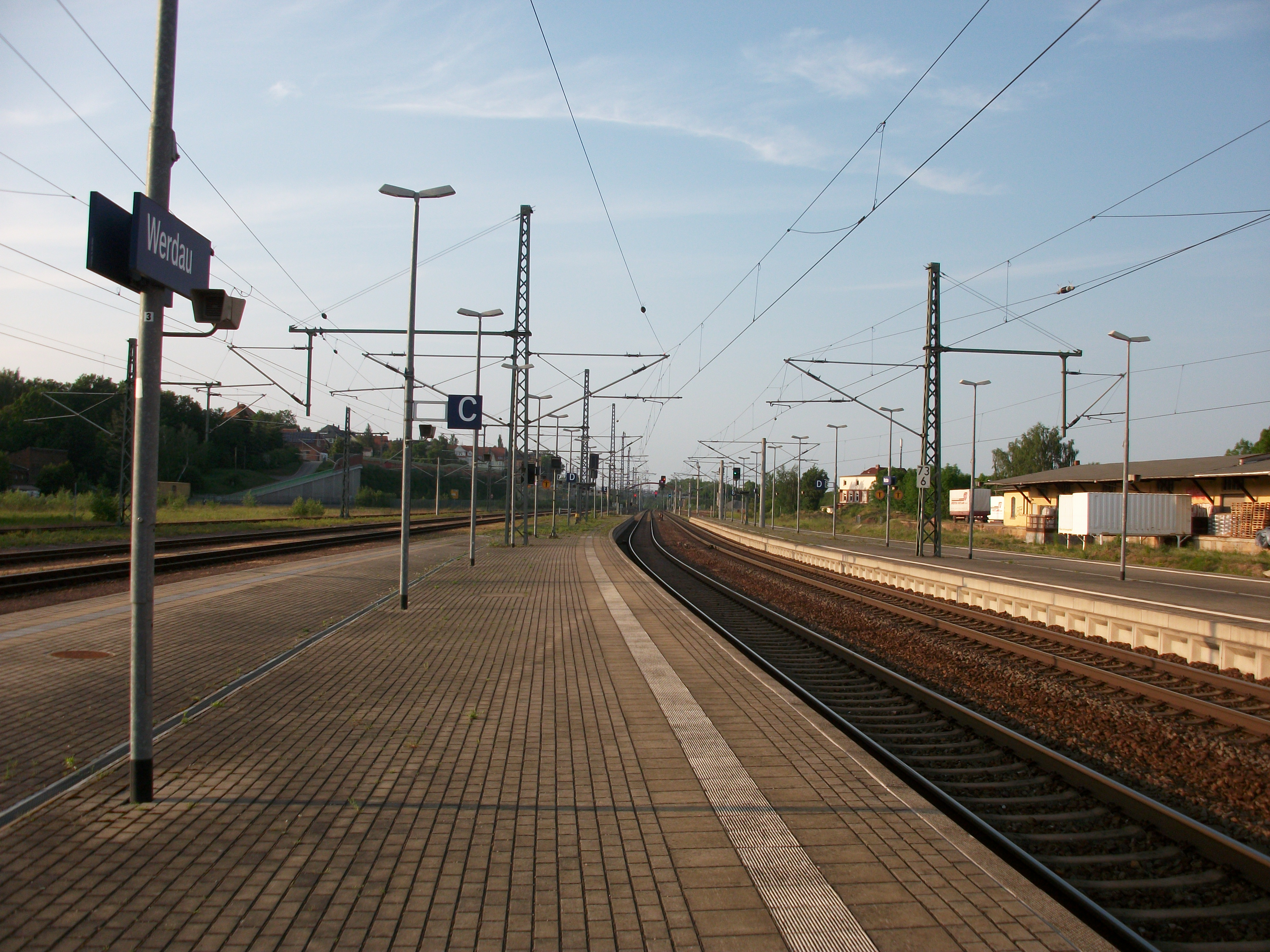
Werdau station, platform (2016)

Werdau West (50°44′15″N 12°21′52″E)

Although the Werdau–Wünschendorf–Weida section was opened on 29 August 1876, the halt (Haltepunkt) of Werdau West was opened on 1 February 1916 with the laying of the route through the urban area of Werdau. The station was closed with the abandonment of rail traffic between Werdau and Wünschendorf (Elster) on 30 May 1999. The dilapidated wooden entrance building and the platforms are still in place, but while the station sign still existed in 2006, it has now disappeared. The halt is located in the western part of its track system. The street that leads to the halt, called Straße zum Westbahnhof (street to the West station), marks the former station. Werdau West is the starting point of the Werdauer Waldbahn, which is operated as a museum railway to Seelingstädt.

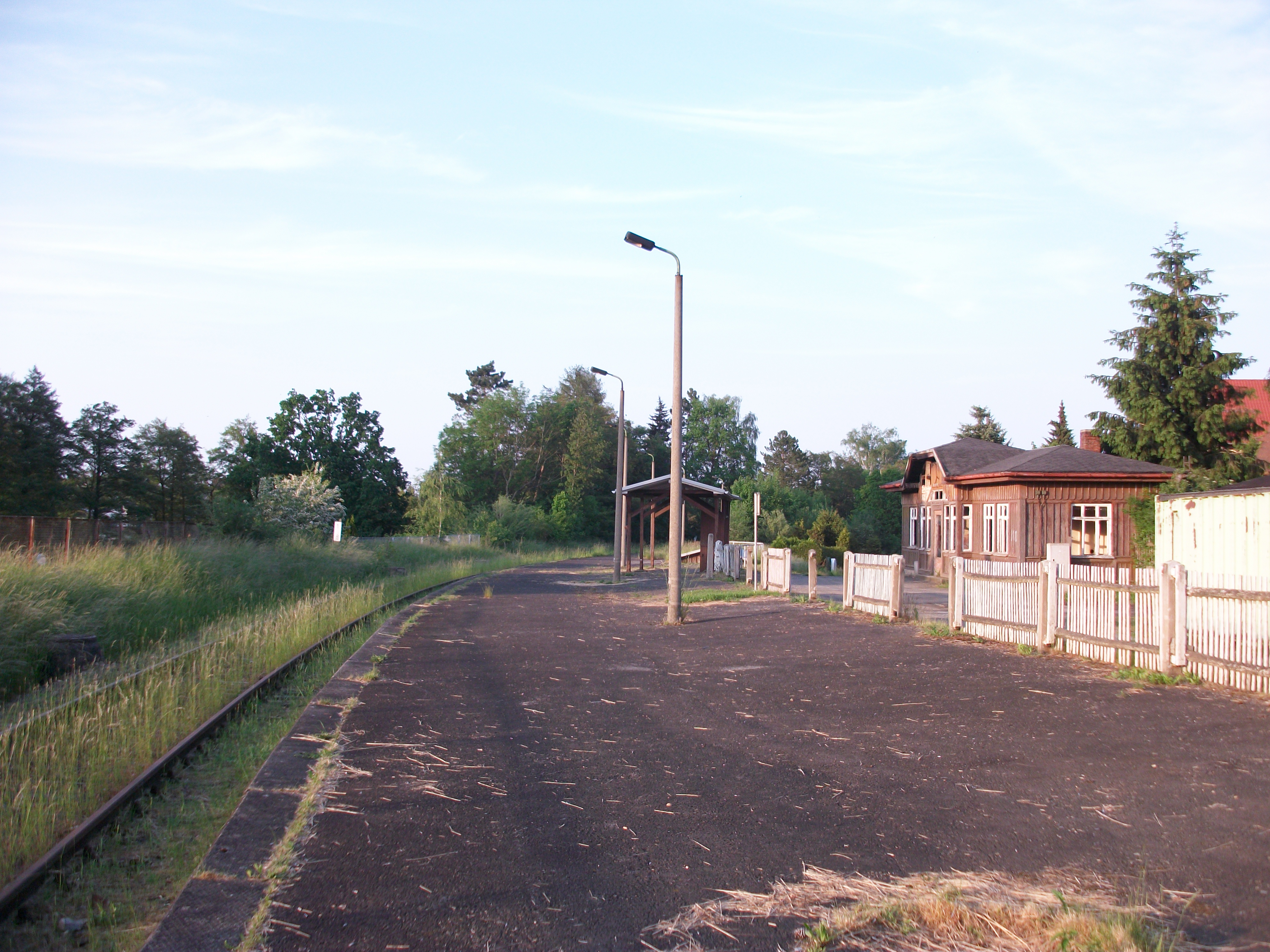
Werdau West halt (2016)

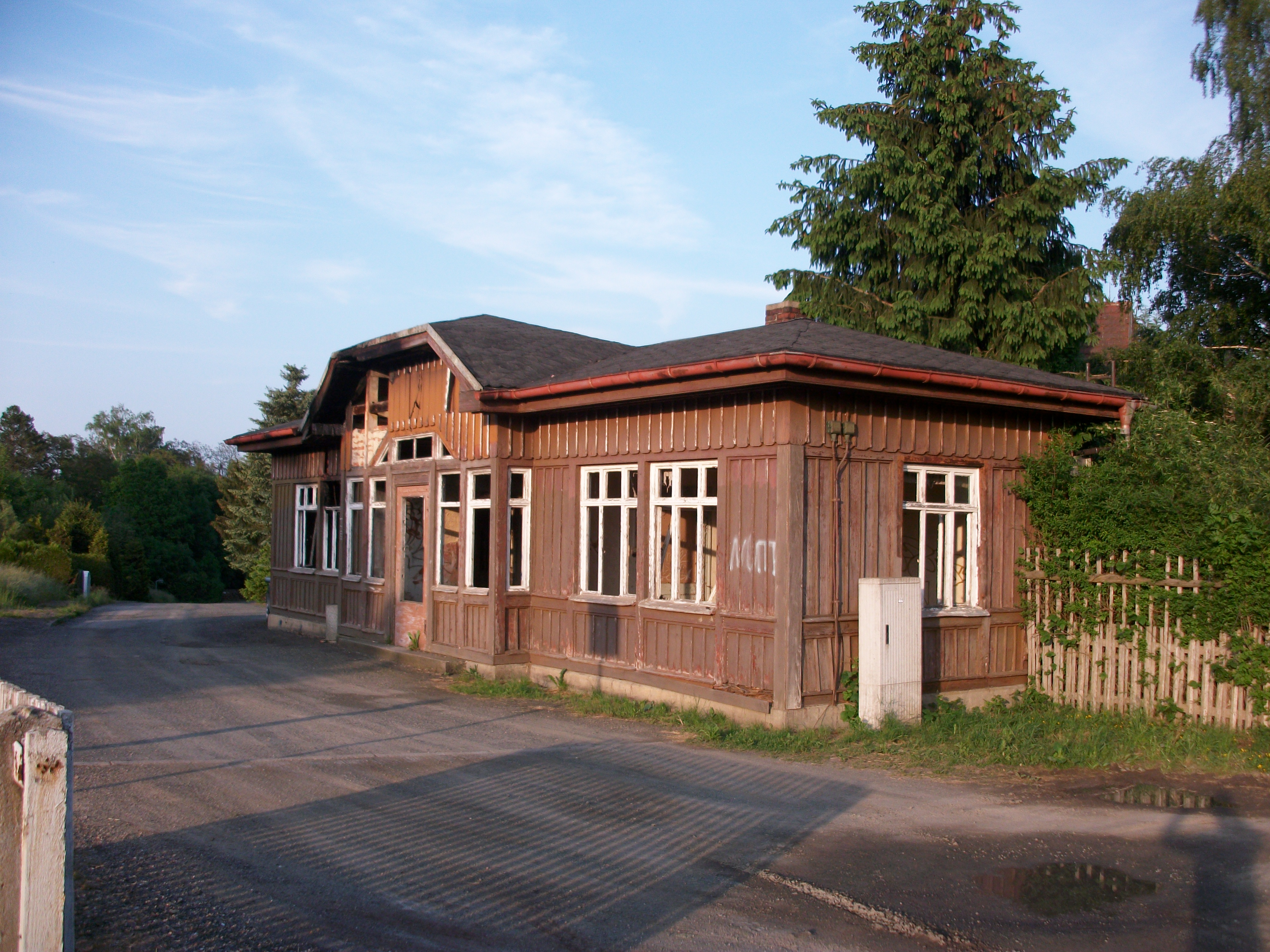
Werdau West halt, waiting room (2016)

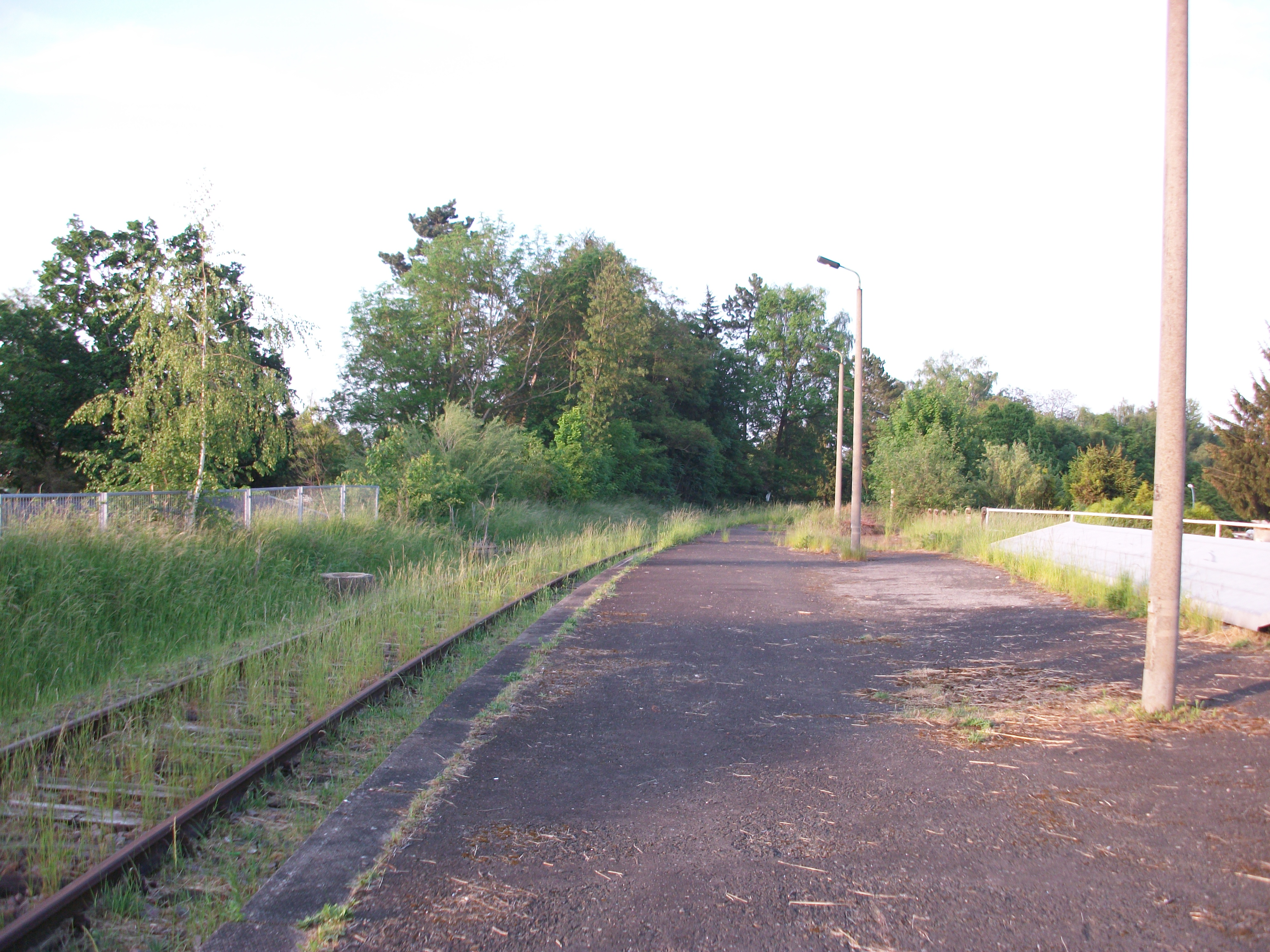
Werdau West halt, platform (2016)

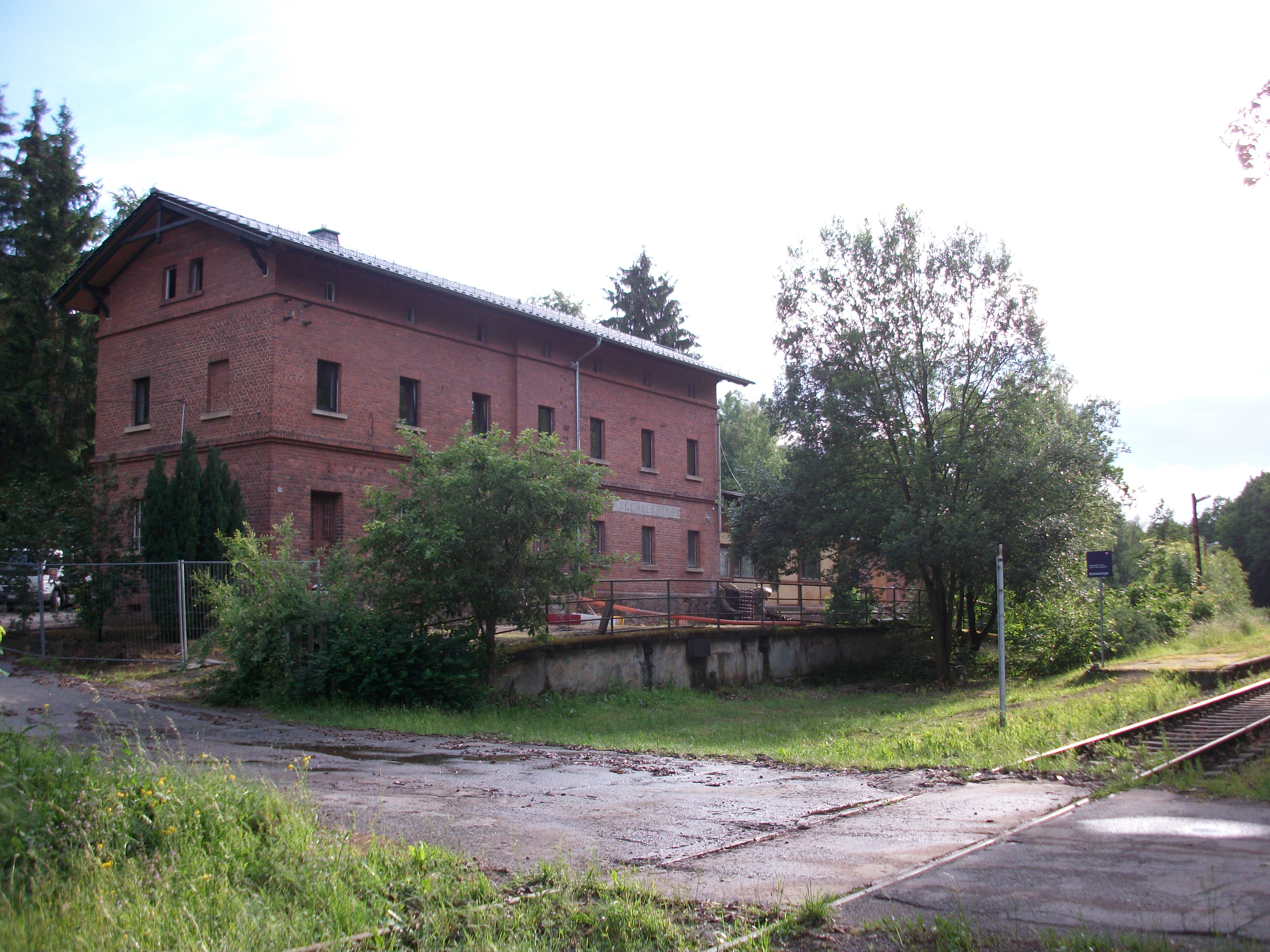
Langenbernsdorf halt (2016)

Langenbernsdorf (50°44′05″N 12°17′45″E)

Langenbernsdorf station was opened on 29 August 1876 as the halt of Bauernsteig on the street of the same name south of Langenbernsdorf in the Werdau Forest. It was designated as a Bahnhof (station) in 1905 and was renamed Langenbernsdorf on 1 May 1908. It was redesignated as a halt in 1933, redesignated as a station in 1952 and redesignated as a halt in 1983. In the station area, the railway forms the southern boundary of the village of Langenbernsdorf, which is connected to the station by Bahnhofstraße. The station was closed on 24 May 1998, one year before the end of rail traffic between Werdau and Wünschendorf (Elster). The entrance building still exists.

Teichwolframsdorf (50°43′54″N 12°16′00″E)

Teichwolframsdorf station was opened on 29 August 1876 as a halt and redesignated as a station in 1905. In addition to the entrance building, the station was equipped with workshops which are still partly preserved. From 1953 until its closure before 1962, a railway connection from Katzendorf to Teichwolframsdorf and sächsischen Aufbereitungsbetrieben (Saxon processing operations) was used by uranium ore trains running as block trains or in groups of wagons. With the abandonment of rail traffic between Werdau and Wünschendorf (Elster), the station was closed on 30 May 1999. It is located on the outskirts of the Thuringian village of Teichwolframsdorf in the Werdau forest.

The border with Saxony runs parallel with the railway to its east. the railway line was also the border between the Grand Duchy of Saxe-Weimar-Eisenach (the Free State of Saxe-Weimar-Eisenach from 1918 to 1920) and the Kingdom of Saxony (also a Free State for a time from 1918 and again since 1990). Between 1920 and 1953, the station was on the Thuringian-Saxon border, then on the border of the districts (Bezirke) of Gera and Karl-Marx-Stadt until 1990.

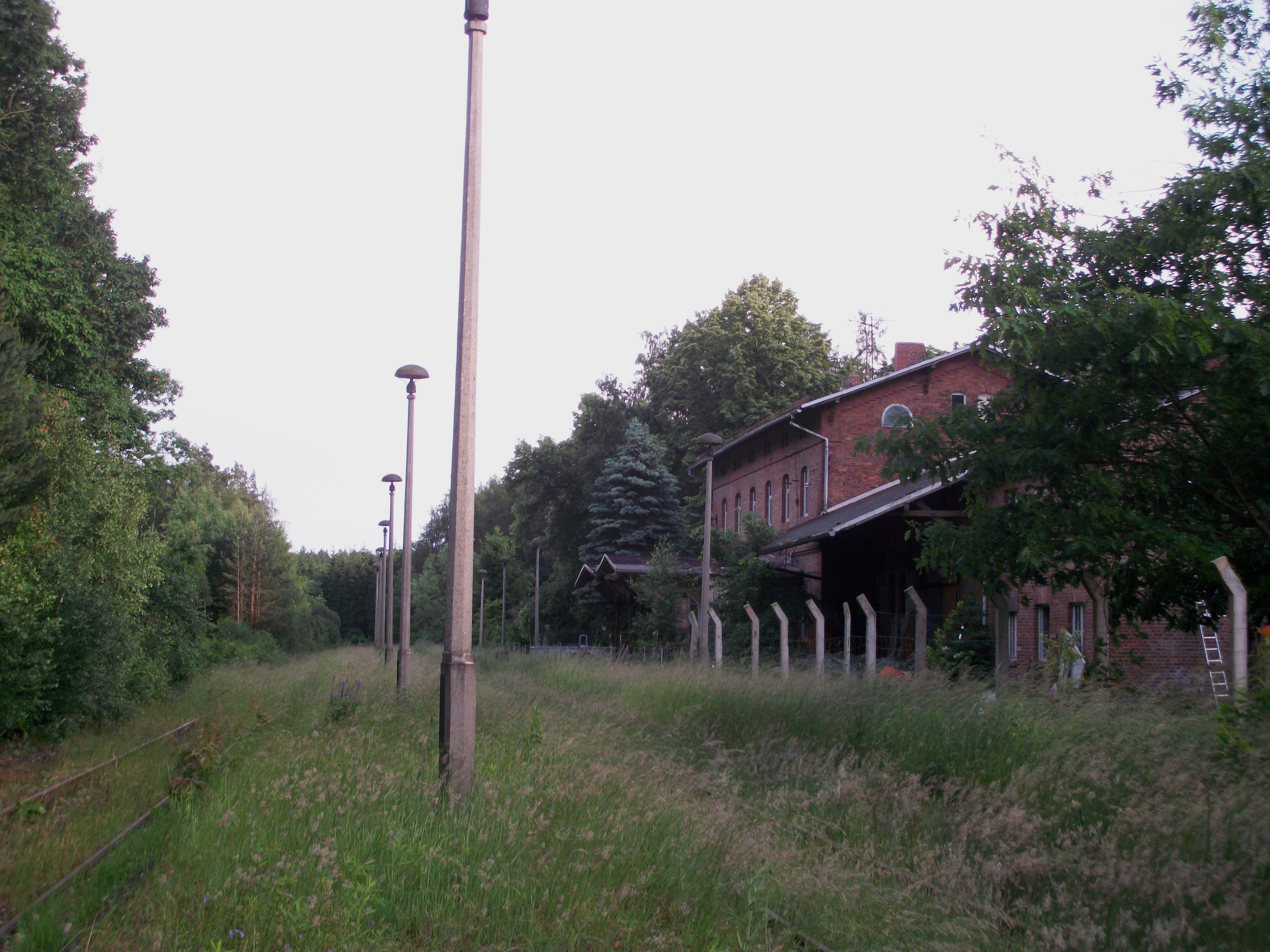
Teichwolframsdorf station (2016)

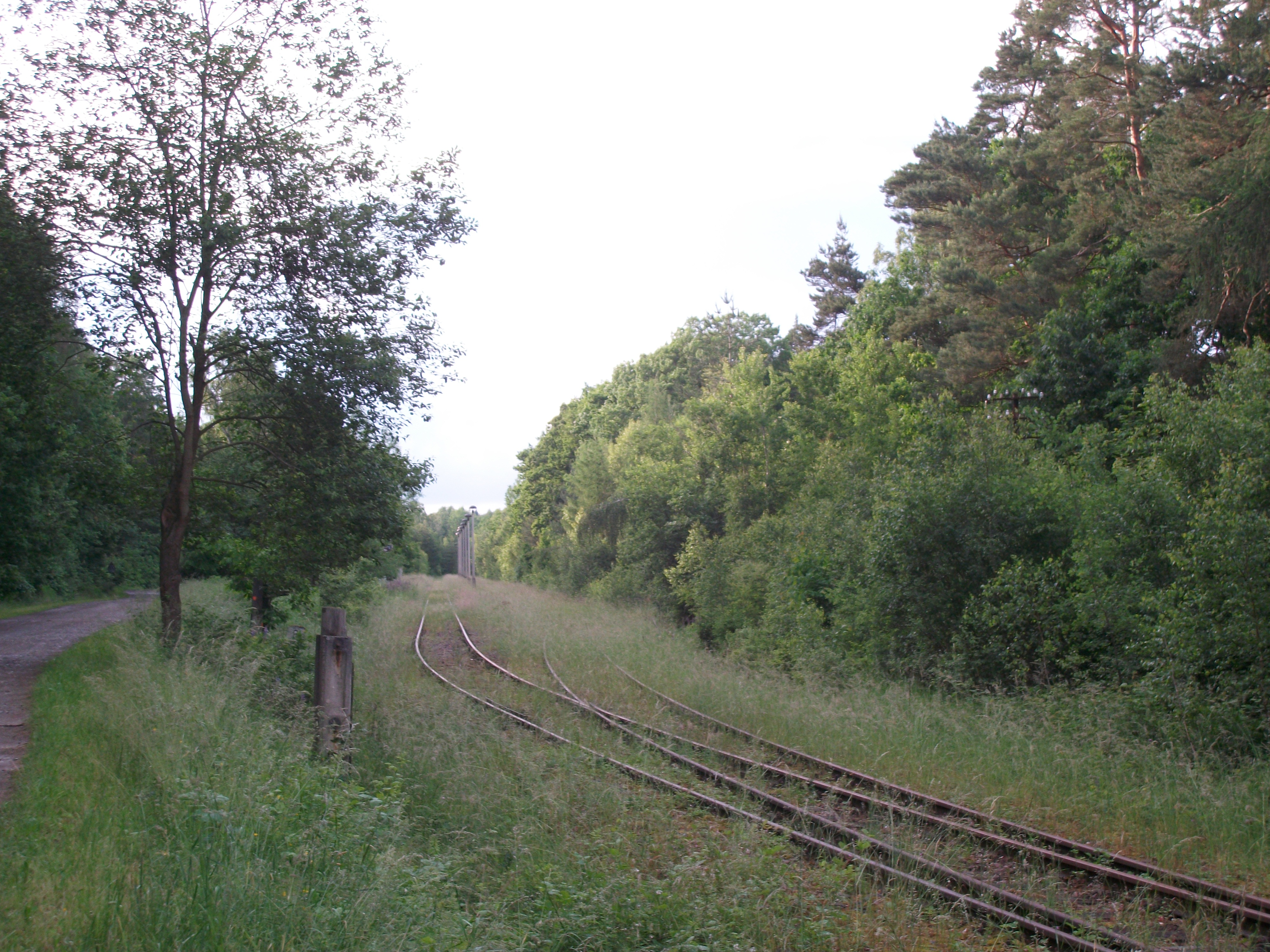
Teichwolframsdorf station, entrance from Werdau (2016)

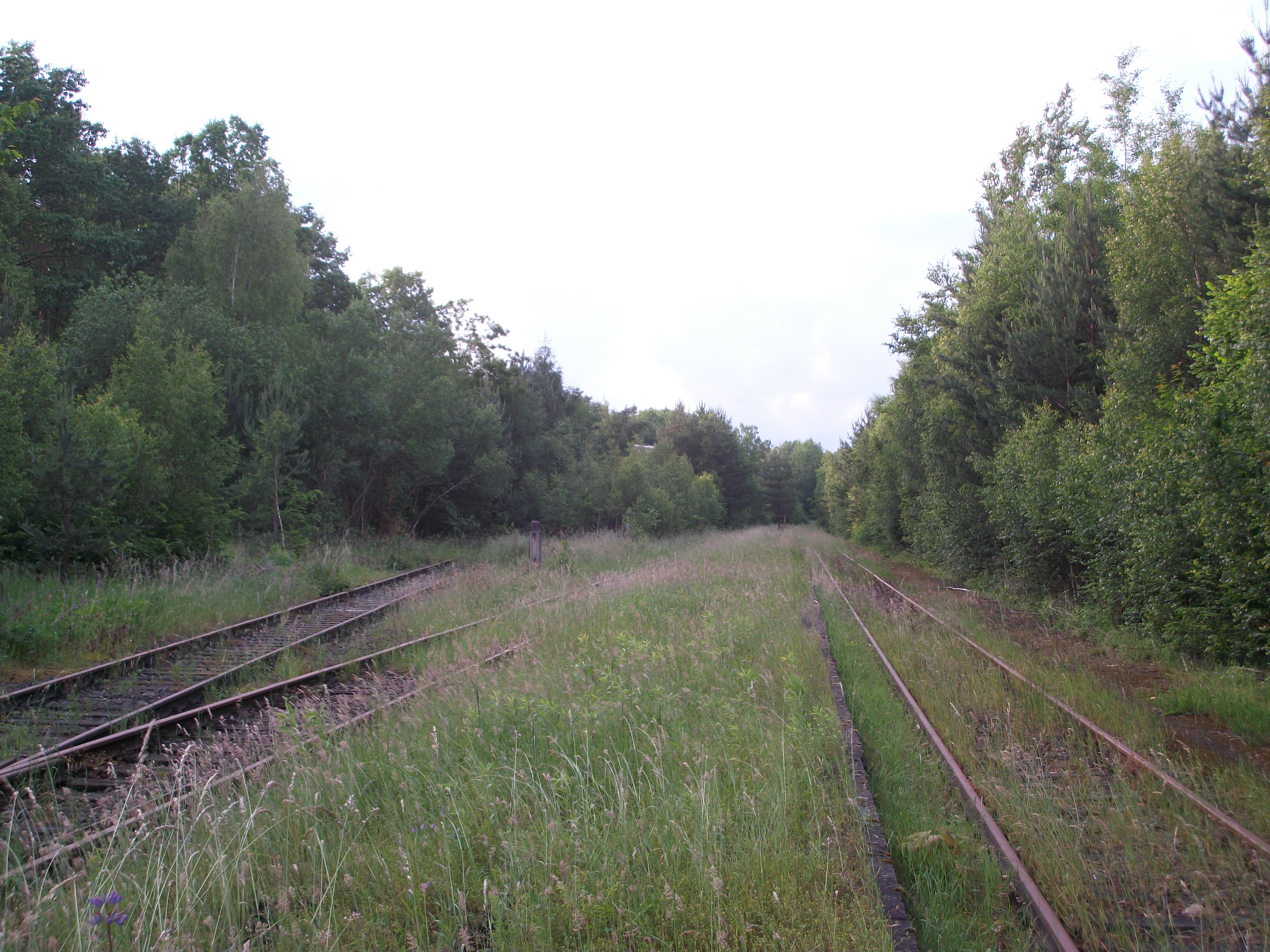
Teichwolframsdorf station, tracks (2016)

Trünzig (50°45′03″N 12°15′29″E)

The halt of Trünzig was opened on 18 May 1952. It is located between the towns of Trünzig in the west and Stöcken in the east on the road called Stöckener Straße to the west and Landsteig to the east. It was redesignated as a halt on 24 May 1998. In addition to a residence, it had a stone waiting-room.

Travelling towards Mehltheuer, Trünzig was the last stop on the Werdau–Wünschendorf (Elster) section in the district of Karl-Marx-Stadt between 1958 and 1990 and it has been the last stop in Saxony since 1990.

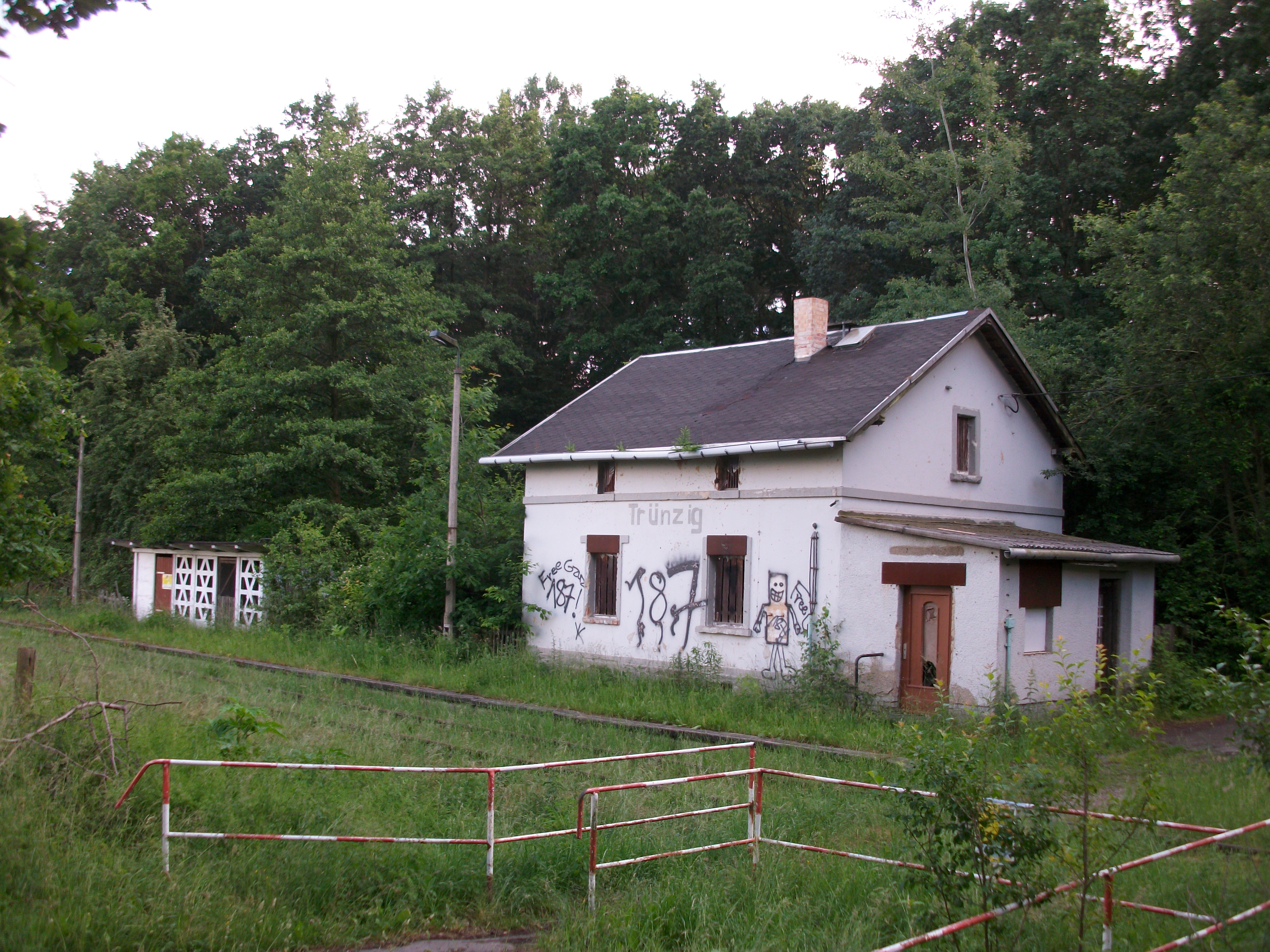
Trünzig halt, entrance building and waiting room (2016)

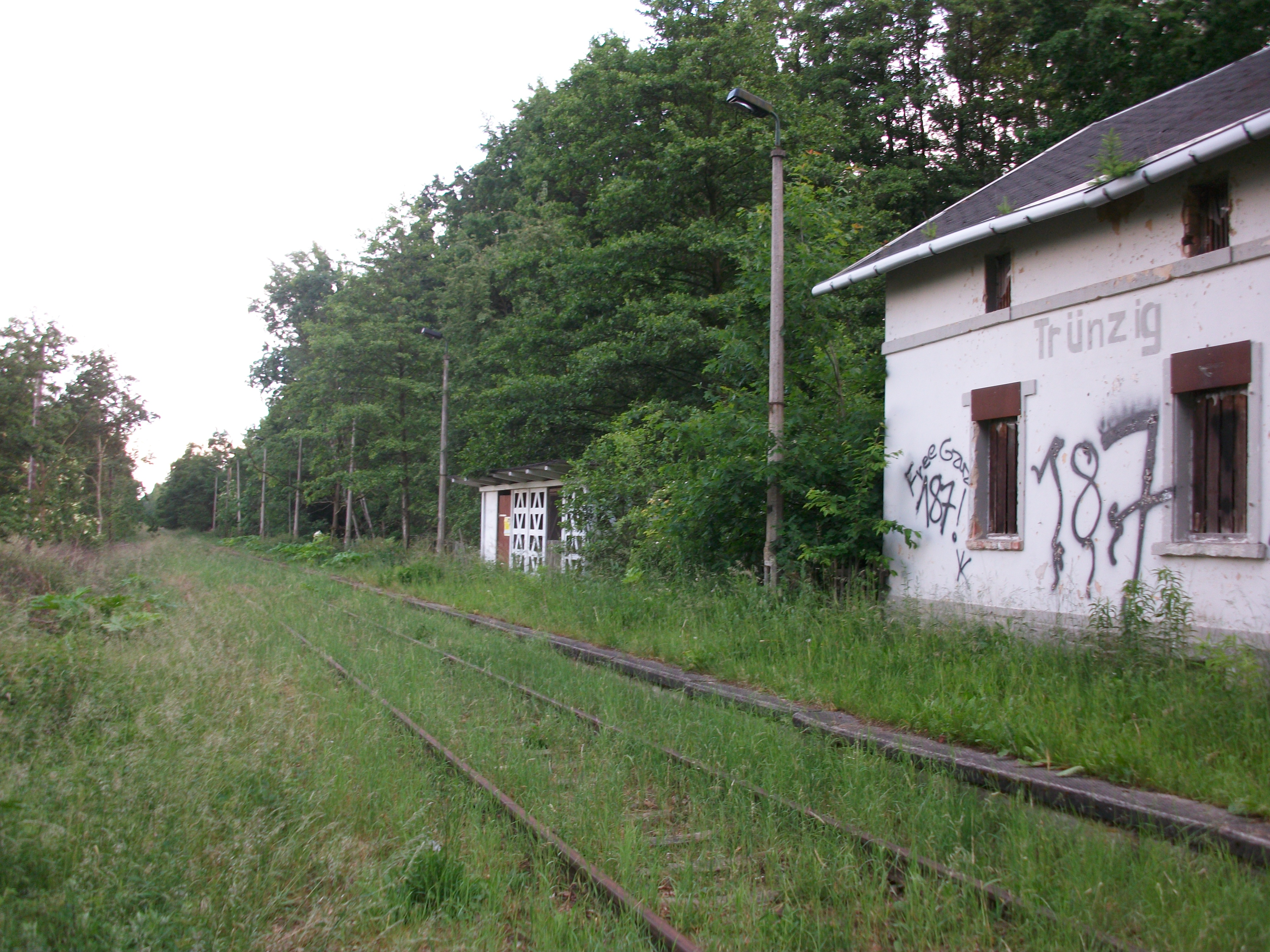
Trünzig halt (2016)

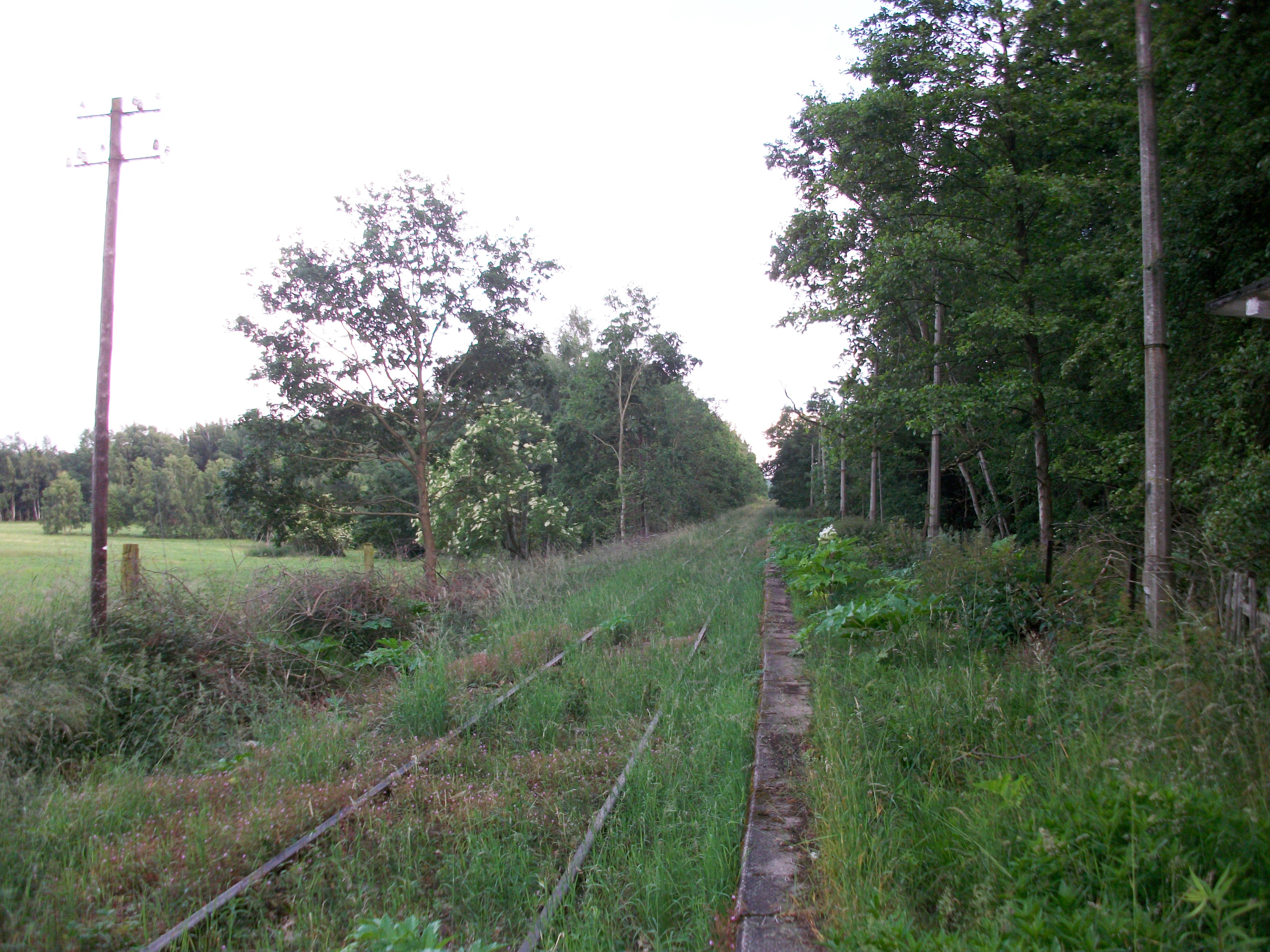
Trünzig halt, platform (2016)

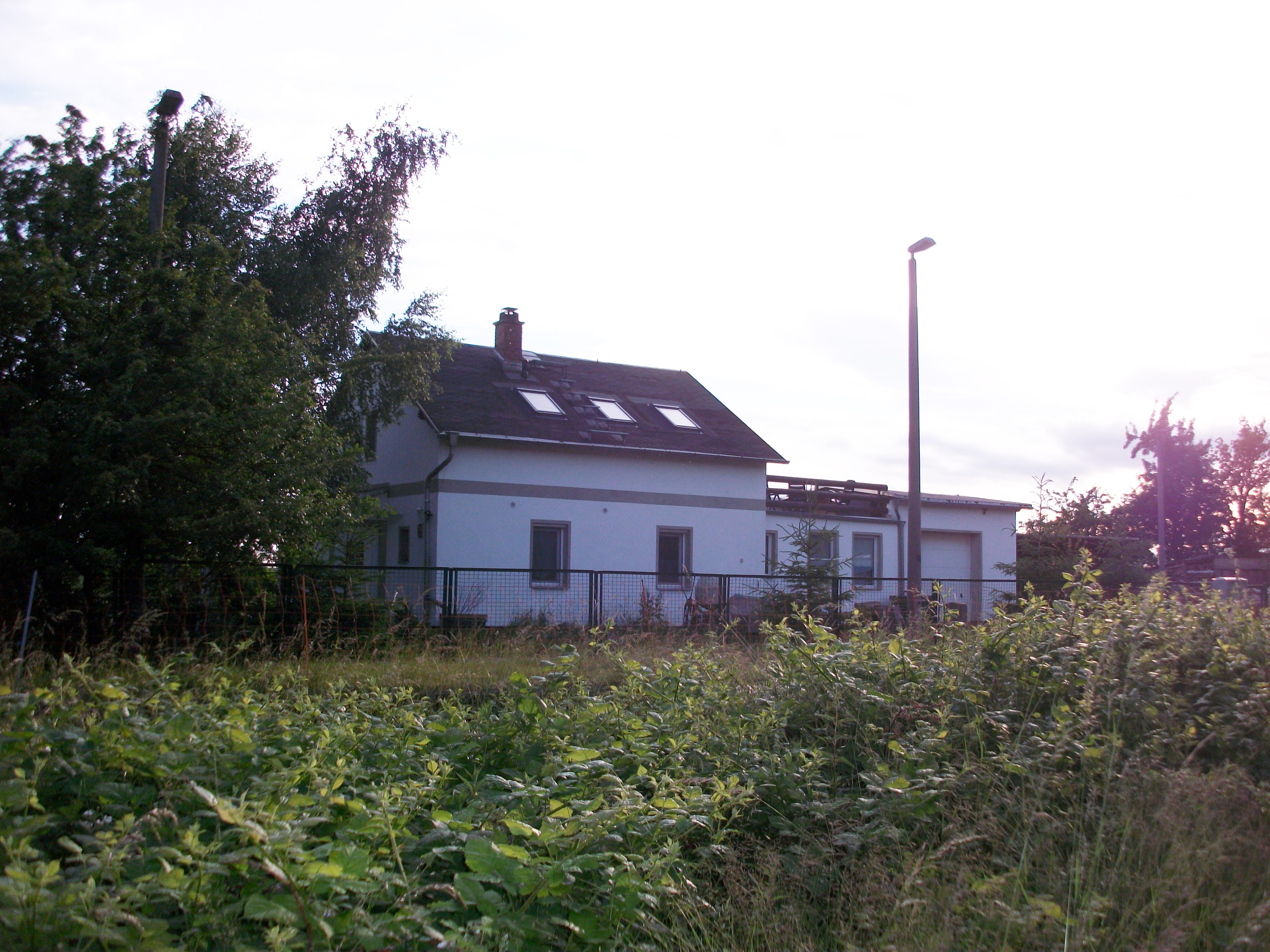
Seelingstädt halt in Chursdorf (2016)

Seelingstädt (b Werdau) Hp (50°46′38″N 12°15′31″E)

The halt of Chursdorf was opened on 1 July 1892 in Chursdorf, which is now a district of Seelingstädt. The station was renamed Chursdorf b Werdau (Chursdorf near Werdau) in 1909. After the place was incorporated into Seelingstädt on 1 April 1939, it was renamed Seelingstädt (b Werdau) Hp on 15 May 1939. It was reclassified as a halt on 24 May 1998.

Seelingstädt (b Werdau) (50°47′14″N 12°14′28″E)

Seelingstädt (b Werdau) station was opened on 29 August 1876 as a halt and was reclassified as a station in 1905. The station, which is about two kilometres north of the old centre of Seelingstädt, subsequently developed into the settlement of Bahnhof Seelingstädt (Seelingstädt station), which is now the largest district of Seelingstädt. The station has had the following names:

- until 1898: Seelingstädt
- until 1911: Seelingstädt bei Werdau
- until 1933: Seelingstädt b Werdau
- since 1933: Seelingstädt (b Werdau)

Seelingstädt station grew considerably in importance from the end of the 1950s as a result of uranium mining in the Ronneburg district. The Wismut-Werkbahn (Busmuth Industrial Railway), which was used for freight, branched from here to Paitzdorf. With the abandonment of passenger traffic between Werdau and Wünschendorf (Elster), the station was converted into a freight yard on 30 May 1999.

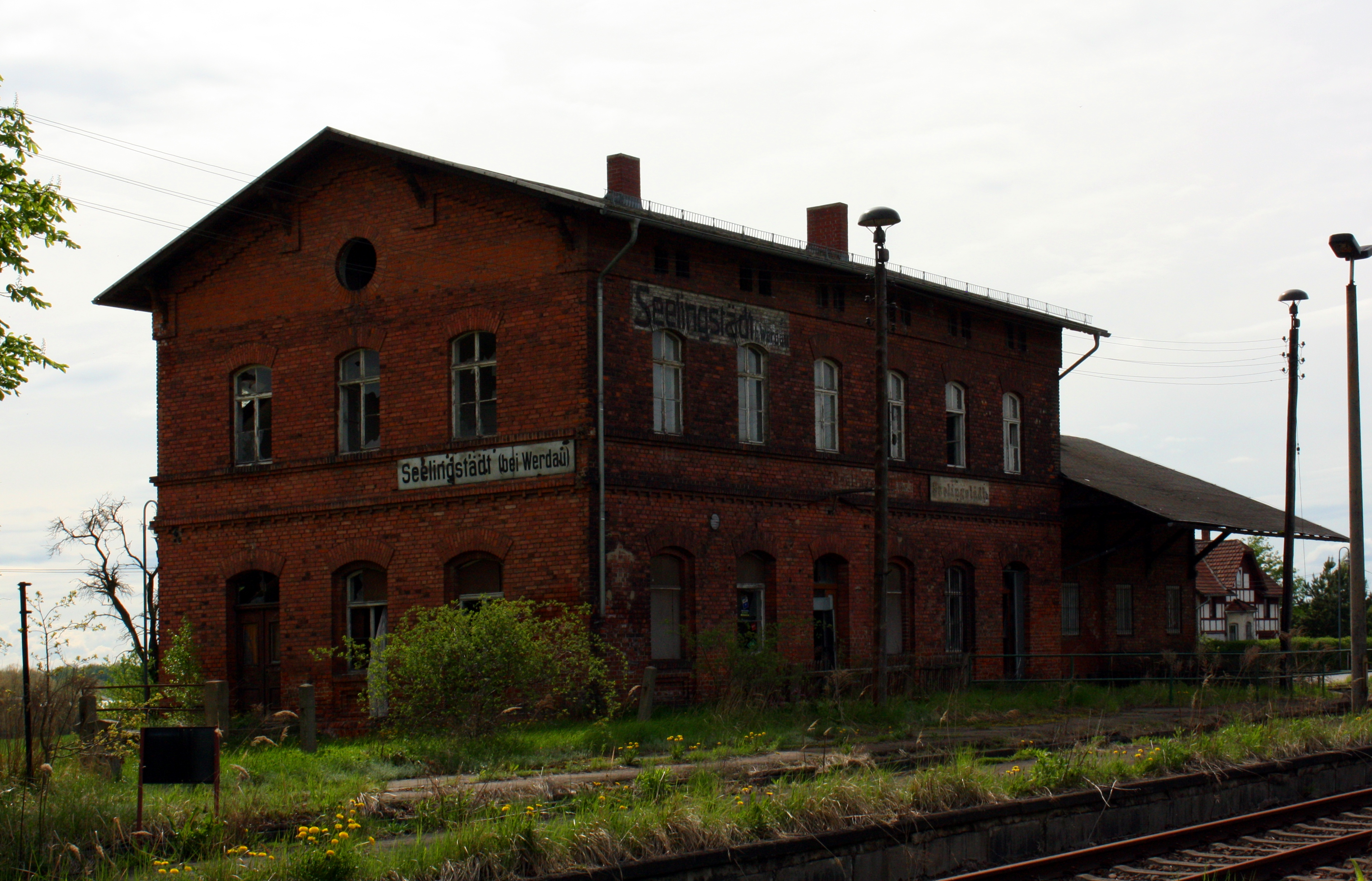
Seelingstädt (b Werdau) station

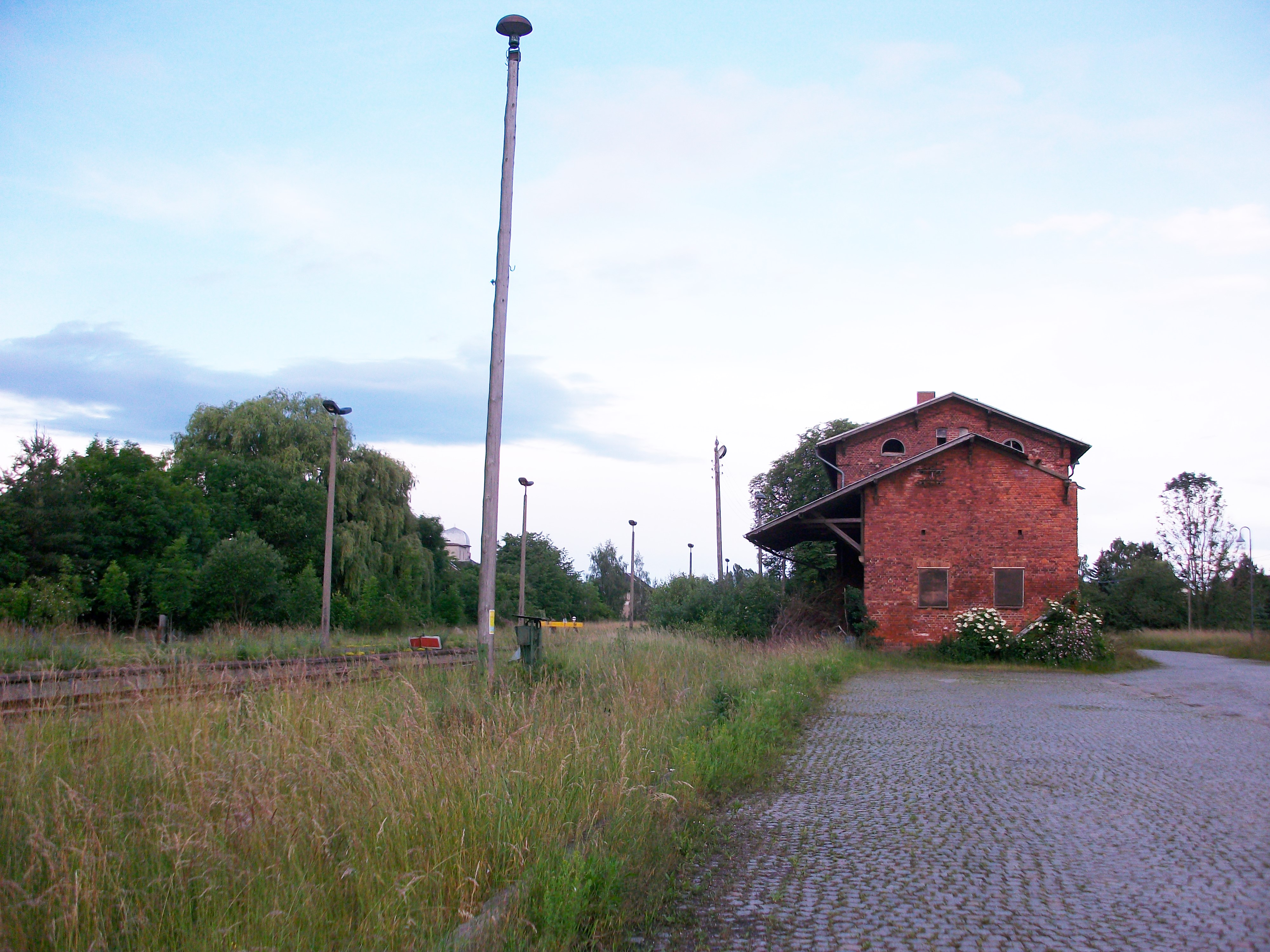
Seelingstädt station, entrance building (2016)

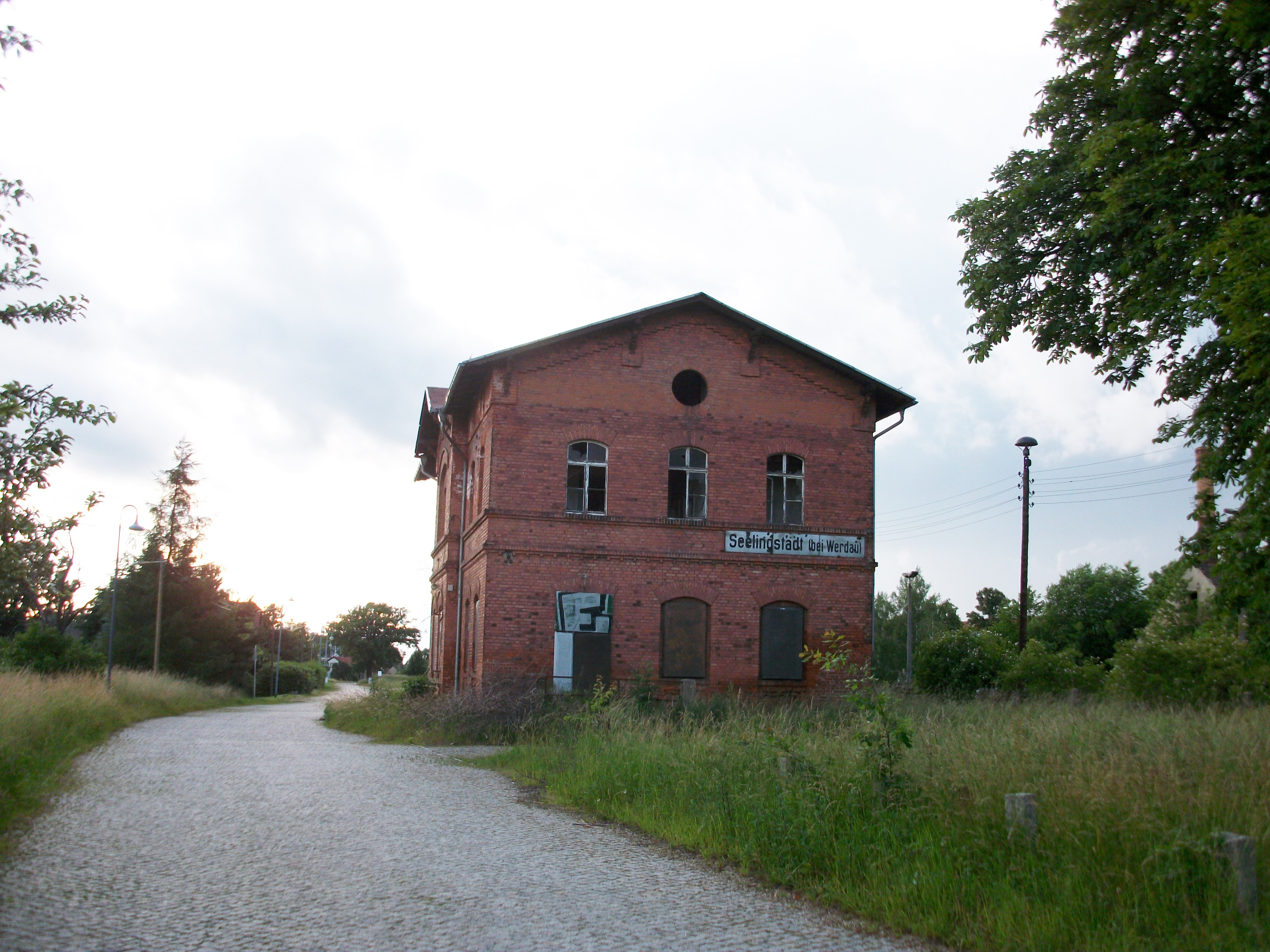
Seelingstädt station, entrance building (2016)

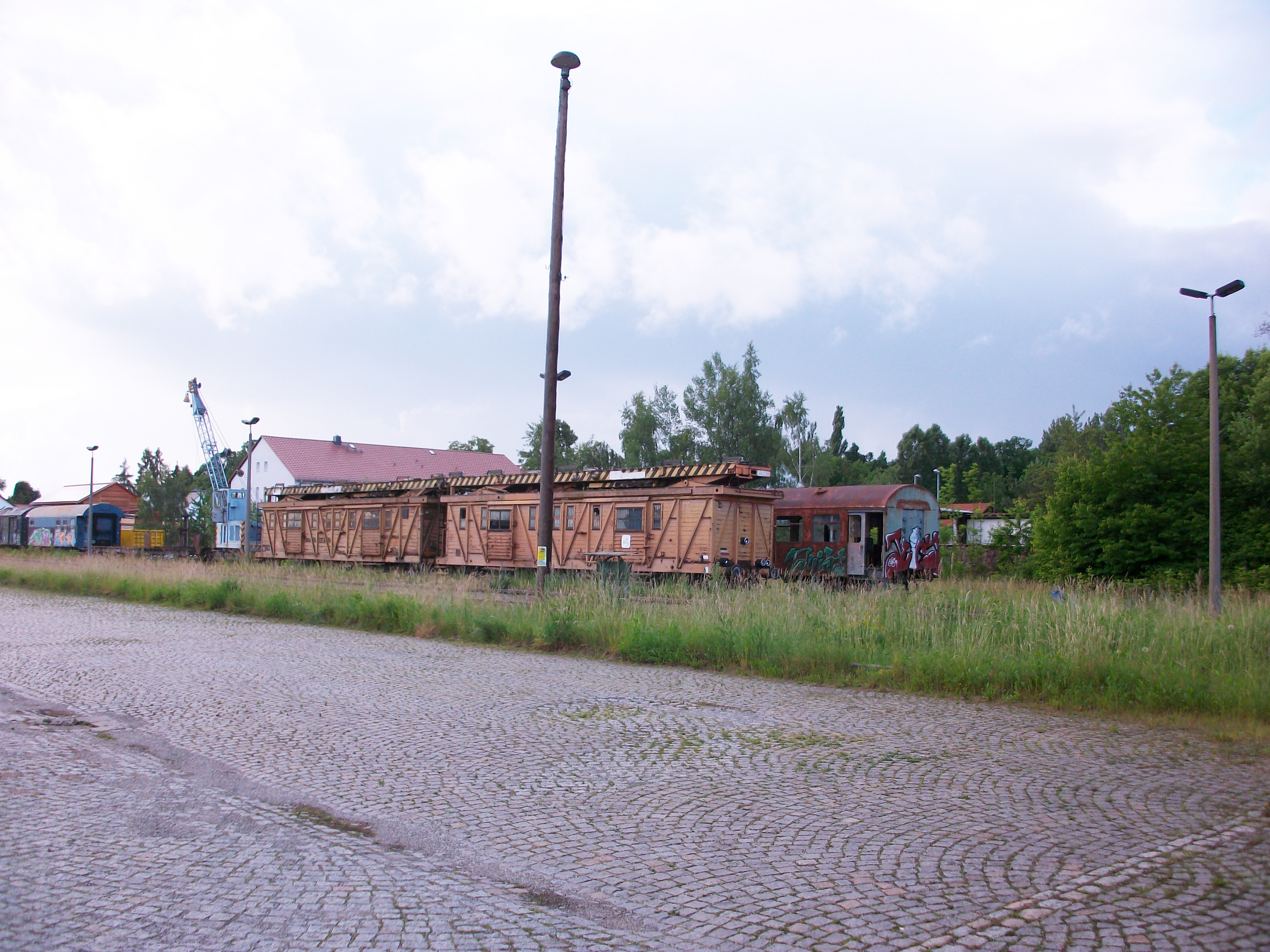
Seelingstädt station (2016)

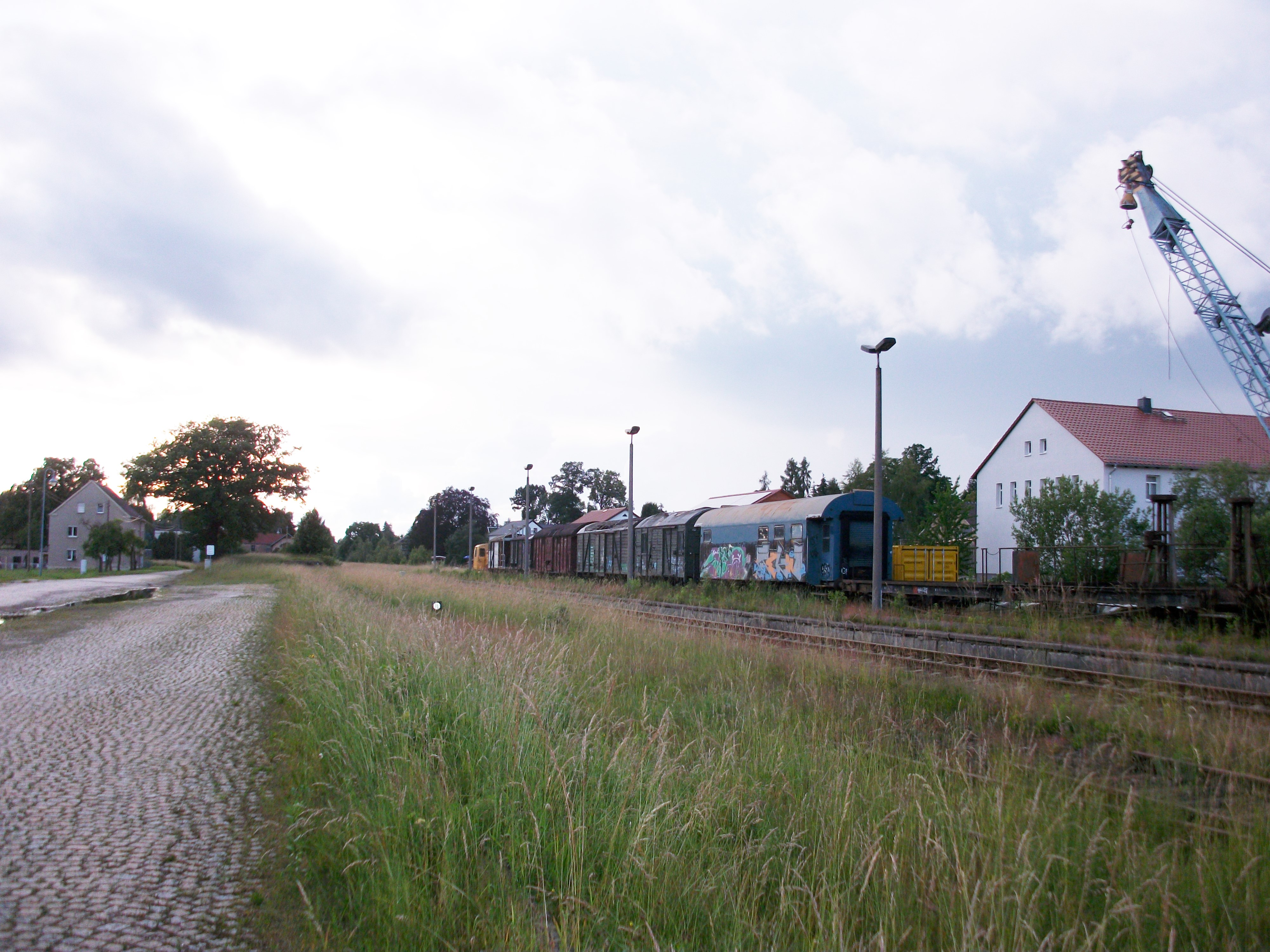
Seelingstädt station (2016)

Gauern (50°47′36″N 12°11′33″E)

The halt of Gauern was opened on 1 October 1884 as a halt and was reclassified as a station in 1905. Until 1920 it was located in Saxe-Altenburg, but since then it has been in Thuringia.

The loading of the uranium ore mined in the open-cast mine of Culmitzsch began in 1957, and the transport for further processing to Lengenfeld, Dresden-Gittersee, Tannenbergsthal and Crossen bei Zwickau began. A 2.2 kilometre-long connecting railway was opened from Gauern to the Culmitzsch loading yard on 11 September 1958; this was closed in 1966

Services stopped serving the station on 24 May1998, a year before the end of passenger traffic between Werdau and Wünschendorf (Elster).

Wolfersdorf (Kr Greiz) (50°47′06″N 12°10′19″E)

The halt of Wolfersdorf (Kr Greiz) was opened on 1 October 1905. Until 1920, it was located in the Grand Duchy and later Free State of Saxe-Weimar-Eisenach and had the following names:

- until 1911: Wolfersdorf bei Weida
- until 1922: Wolfersdorf b Weida
- from 1922: Wolfersdorf (Kr Greiz)

Services stopped serving the station on 24 May 1998, a year before the end of passenger traffic between Werdau and Wünschendorf (Elster).

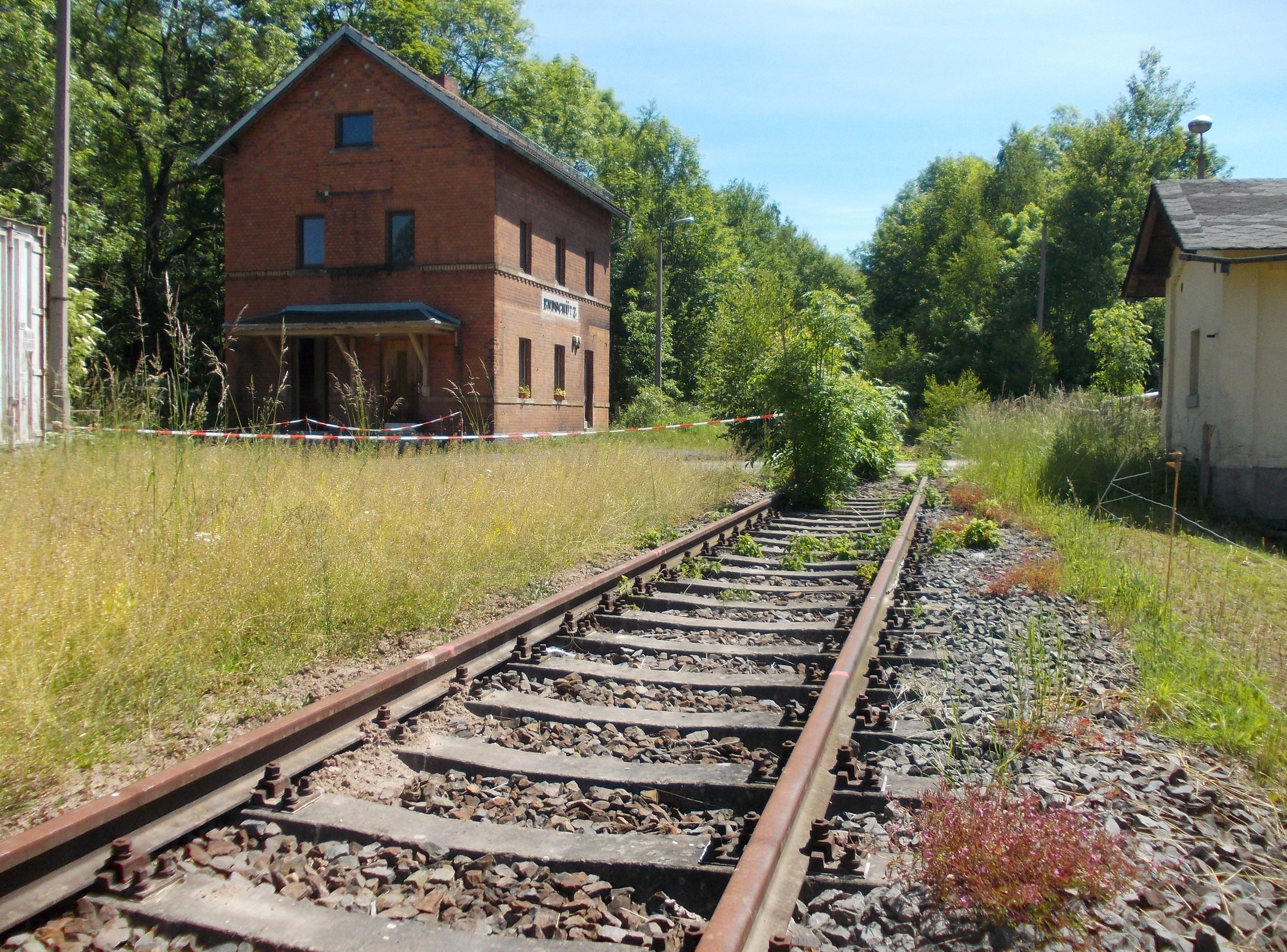
Endschütz halt

Endschütz (50°46′57″N 12°08′32″E)

Endschütz station was opened on 1 October 1893. It was a halt until 1905 and a station until 1974 and has been a halt since then. Services stopped serving the station on 24 May 1998, a year before the end of passenger traffic between Werdau and Wünschendorf (Elster). The red-brick entrance building still exists.

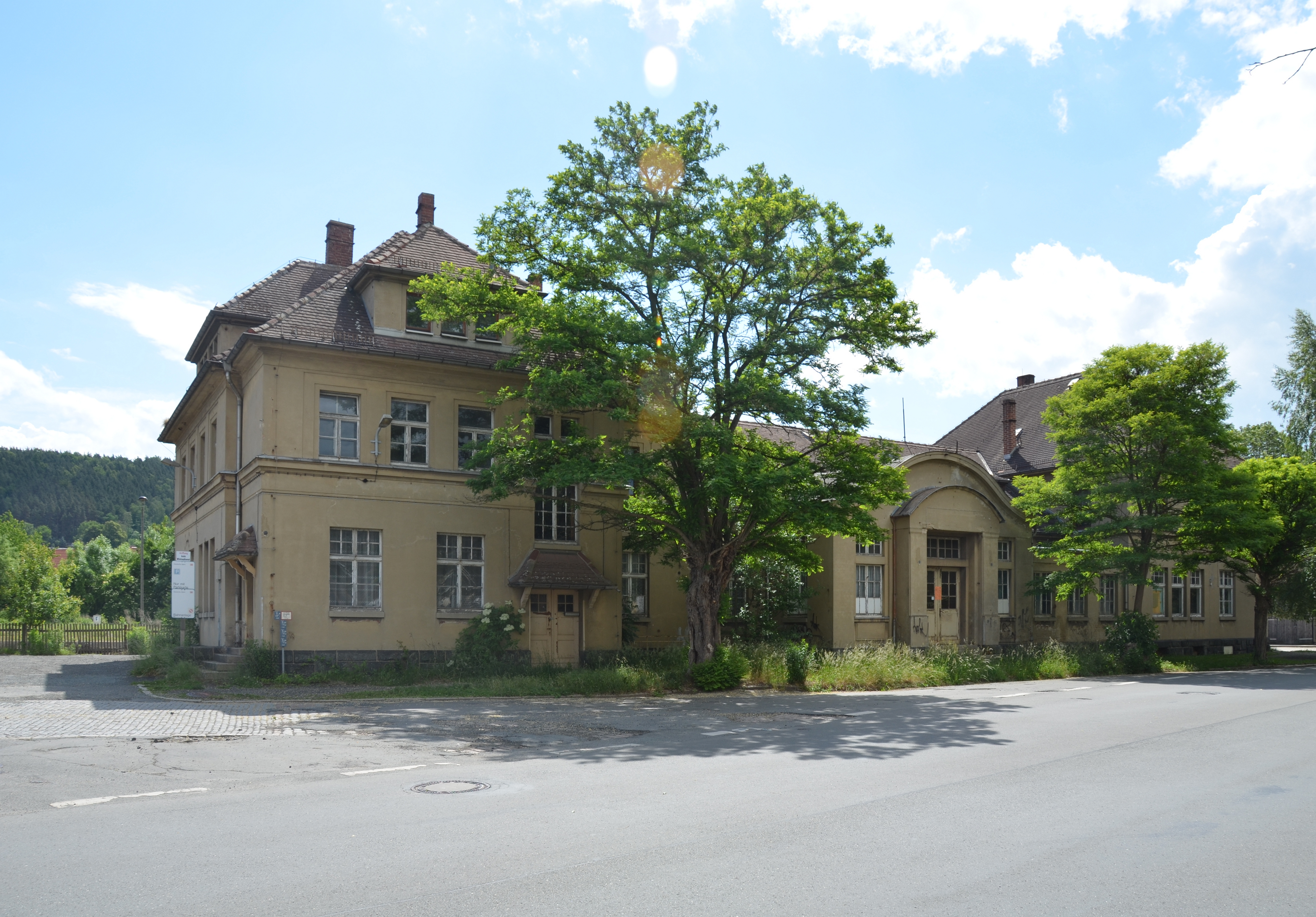
Bahnhof Wünschendorf (Elster)

Wünschendorf (Elster) (50°47′51″N 12°05′52″E)

The halt of Wünschendorf was opened on 17 July 1875 with the Gera Süd–Weischlitz railway. After the opening of the Werdau–Wünschendorf–Weida section of the Werdau–Mehltheuer railway on 29 August 1876, it was designated as a station on 1 August 1884. It has had the following names:

- until 1908: Wünschendorf
- until 1911: Wünschendorf a.d. Elster
- since 1911: Wünschendorf (Elster)

Since the closure of the Wünschendorf (Elster)–Weida section on 1 May 1997 and the closure of the Werdau–Wünschendorf (Elster) section on 15 November 2000, the Wünschendorf (Elster) station has only been a stop on the Gera Süd–Weischlitz railway.

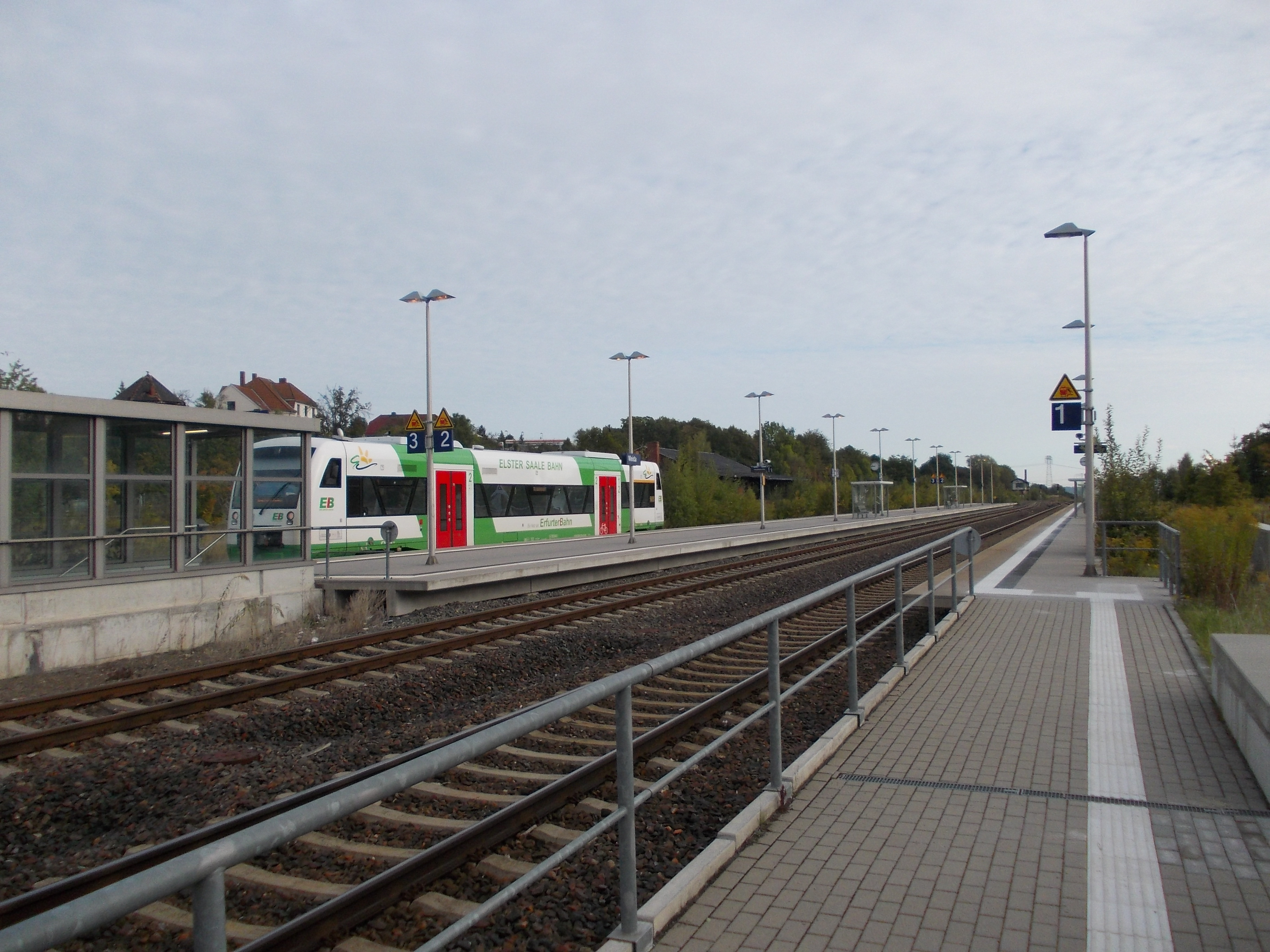
Weida station

Weida (50°47′10″N 12°03′45″E)

Weida station was opened to the north of the town on 20 December 1871 with the opening of the Gera–Eichicht (now: Kaulsdorf (Saale)) section of the Leipzig–Probstzella railway by the Prussian state railways. The Prussian entrance building was also inaugurated in the same year. With the opening of the Werdau–Wünschendorf–Weida section of the Werdau–Mehltheuer railway on 29 August 1876 by the Saxon State Railway, Weida station was given a Saxon entrance building in about 1885. In 1905, it was designated as a station. At that time, the station had several buildings, such as signal boxes, freight sheds, a water tower and a station master's residence.

The Saxon station of Weida has had the following names:

- until 1911: Weida
- until 1920: Weida Sächs Stb
- until 1922: Weida Ost
- since 1922: Weida

The Saxon part of the station was reallocated in 1922 from the Eisenbahndirektion (railway division) Dresden to the Eisenbahndirektion Erfurt. The Saxon entrance building was demolished in 1981 and the Prussian entrance building was demolished in 2004. In the course of the modernisation, the platforms were equipped with modern waiting rooms. Since the end of passenger traffic on the Wünschendorf (Elster)–Weida section on 2 June 1996, trains in Weida station operate towards Gera–Leipzig, Saalfeld and Mehltheuer–Hof.

Weida Mitte (50°46′35″N 12°03′20″E)

The halt of Weida Mitte was opened on 14 June 2002. It is located in the centre of Weida on Friedensstraße. The halt has a modern waiting room.

Weida Altstadt (50°46′04″N 12°03′30″E)

The halt of Weida-Altstadt was opened on 15 November 1883 and designated as a station in 1905. It has been called Weida Altstadt since 1911. It was downgraded to a halt in 1971. The dilapidated entrance building is no longer in use. The station is located in the south of Weida on Berggartenstraße/ Gräfenbrücker Straße.

Loitsch–Hohenleuben (50°44′02″N 12°02′54″E)

The halt of Loitsch–Hohenleuben was opened on 15 November 1883 and designated as a station in 1905. It was spelt as Loitzsch–Hohenleuben until 1901. The restored entrance building is no longer in use. The station is located in the town of Loitsch at the confluence of the Leuba and the Weida.

Schüptitz (50°43′22″N 12°01′47″E)

The halt of Schüptitz was opened on 1 October 1904. It has an entrance building and a wooden waiting room. After the stop in Schüptitz had been discontinued in 2011, it was restored after citizens protests in 2012. The station also now has a modern waiting room.

Hohenleuben (50°42′10″N 12°02′11″E)

The halt of Hohenleuben was opened on 15 November 1883 under the name of Reichenfels. It was renamed as Hohenleuben in 1915. Between 1930 and 1950 it was designated as a station. The entrance building was demolished in 2010. The halt is located southwest of the ruins of Reichenfels castle, which gave the station its first name. Hohenleuben is located about two kilometres to the northeast.

Haltepunkt Triebes (50°41′17″N 12°01′24″E)

With the transfer of the halt in the urban area of Triebes to the area of a shopping center in 2006, the halt of Triebes was opened on the street of Triebesgrund. It is located in the centre of Triebes on the bank of the Triebes river.

Bahnhof Triebes (50°40′59″N 12°01′18″E)

The halt of Triebes was opened on 15 November 1883. It was dedicated as a station between 1885 and 1894 and between 1896 and 2006. The entrance building of 1912 was demolished in 2013. The southern station remained open with the transfer of the town's halt to the street of Triebesgrund.

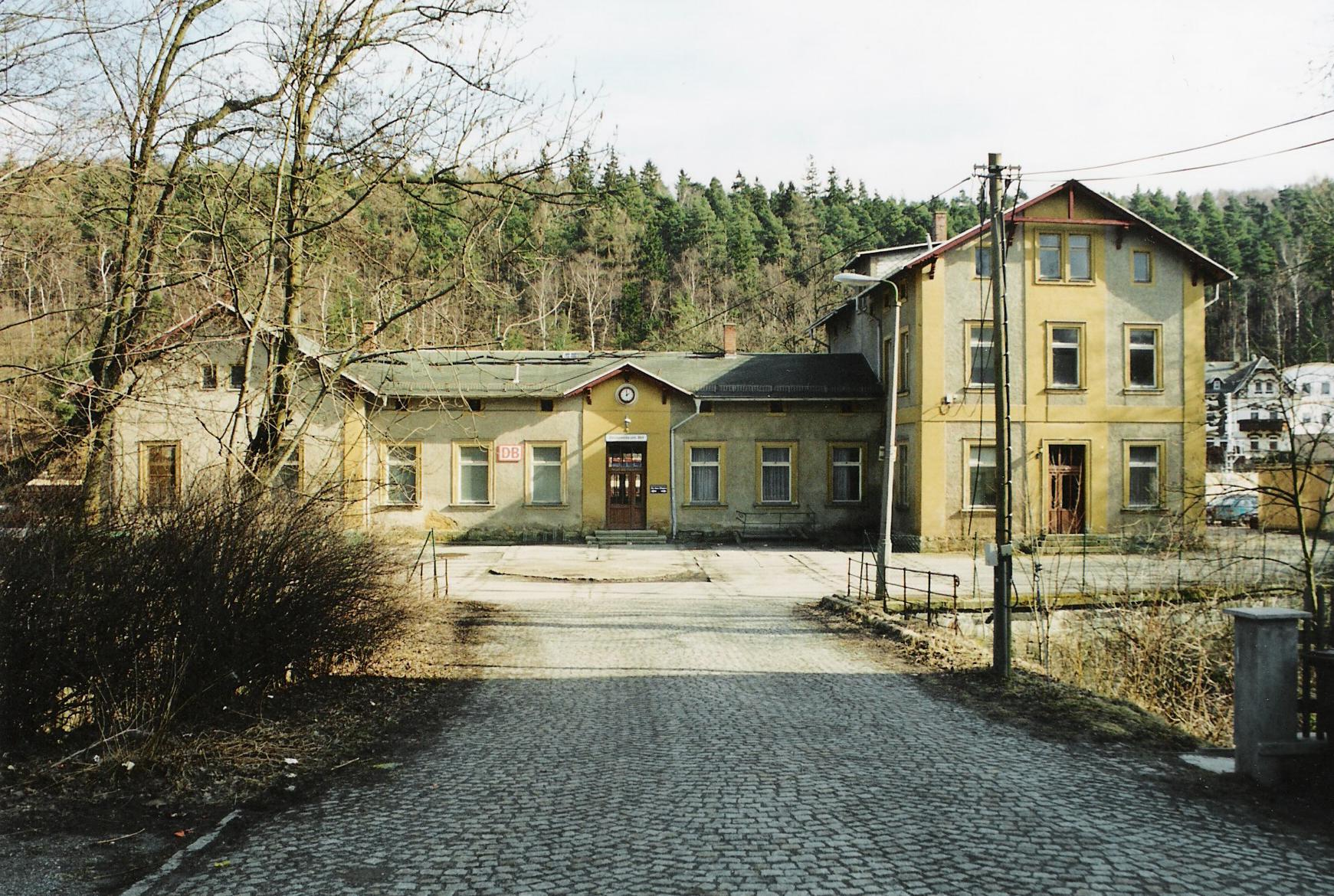
Zeulenroda unt Bf (2004)

Zeulenroda unt Bf (50°39′35″N 12°00′41″E)

A 3.7 km long branch line began in Zeulenroda unt Bf, which opened on 15 August 1883, and connected the lower station on the outskirts with the upper station close to the centre. It was opened on 1 September 1914 and had the nickname of the Stadtbahn (city railway). Traffic on it ended in 1996.

In 1987, the station area received colour light signals and a signal box, which were supplied by the Soviet company, EZMG.

Pöllwitz (50°37′41″N 12°01′27″E)

The facilities of Pöllwitz station, which opened on 15 August 1883, consisted of three through platform tracks, which most recently had a useful length of 643 m. In 1987, the station received colour light signals and a signal box from the Soviet company, EZMG. Wagonload traffic was discontinued in 1994. Since the end of passenger services in 2011, the station has been completely demolished.

The river Triebes flows to the west of the station which in this area forms the border between Thuringian and Saxon Vogtland.

Pausa (50°35′16″N 12°00′14″E)

The halt of Pausa was opened on 15 November 1883 and designated as a station in 1905. It was redesignated as a halt in 1970. In addition to the entrance building, there are also freight sheds, work shops and a track supervisor's office (Bahnmeisterei) on the site.

Apart from the terminal station of Mehltheuer, Pausa was the only Saxon station on the Weida–Mehltheuer section until 1952. The town became part of the Gera district in 1952, became part of Thuringia in 1990 and returned to Saxony in 1992 as the result of a popular vote.

Bernsgrün (50°33′58″N 12°02′26″E)

The halt of Bernsgrün was opened on 1 October 1885 and was closed on 11 December 2011. The waiting room had been demolished by 2002. The halt of Bernsgrün, which was originally in the Principality of the Reuss Elder Line and from 1920 in Thuringia, was located between the Saxon stations of Pausa and Mehltheuer.

Mehltheuer (50°32′39″N 12°32′39″E)

Mehltheuer station, which was opened on 20 November 1848 on the Leipzig–Hof railway, became more important after the opening of the Werdau–Weida–Mehltheuer railway. The station was extended significantly in the 1880s and a small locomotive depot was built. The next major changes took place immediately after the Second World War, when several tracks were dismantled. Of the former 29 tracks, seven are still available today, and there is also a connecting track to a liquid gas storage facility.

=== Civil engineering ===
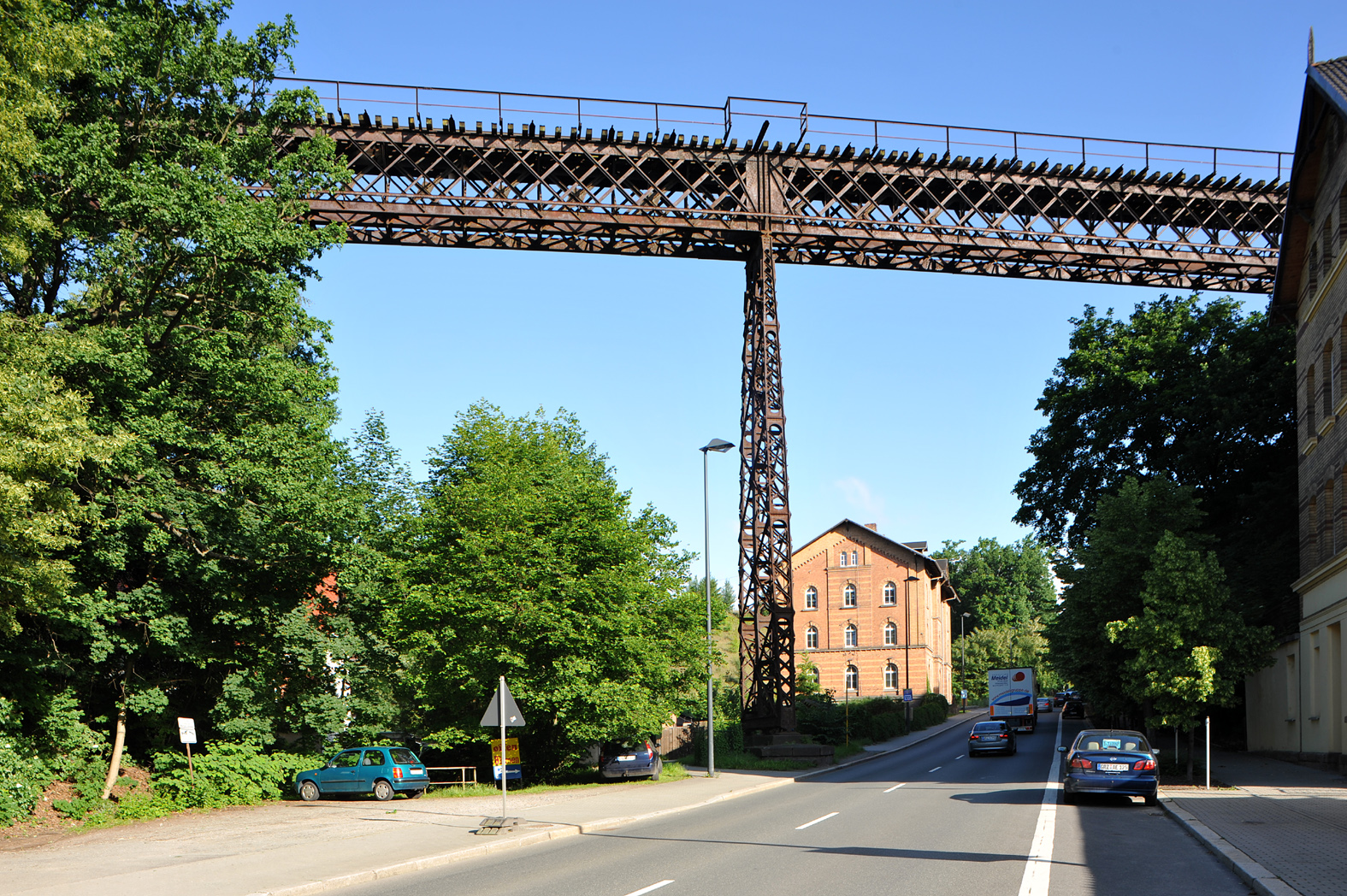
Oschütztal Viaduct (2009)

Oschütztal Viaduct

The viaduct over the Oschütz valley (Oschütztal) in Weida is the longest and most important bridge construction on the line. The 185 metre-long and 28 metre-high truss bridge is designed as a pendulum pillar viaduct (Pendelpfeilerviadukt) and is now under heritage protection. Since 1983 it has not been used for structural reasons and the junction has been moved further south.

Tunnels

The railway line now has two tunnels, the 79 metre-long Schlossberg Tunnel between Weida Mitte and Weida Altstadt and the 71 metre-long Vipsberg Tunnel between Weida Altstadt and Loitsch-Hohenleuben. The 97 metre-long Schüptitz Tunnel was converted into a cutting in 1929, because otherwise an expensive partial restoration would have been necessary. The removed rock has been safely secured in the sides of the cutting.

== Rolling stock use ==
Passenger transport on both sections of the line were dominated in the 1990s by class 219 locomotives, or in their absence by class 202 locomotives. For additional capacity these were augmented by class 628 sets. From 1992 onwards, class 220 locomotives were originally used between Weida and Mehltheuer to haul sand trains for the upgrade of the Plauen–Hof line and a little later shared the haulage of tank-wagons with class 219 locomotives. From 1997 until 1999, a train of milk wagons ran to and from Italy, hauled by two locomotives of class 219, class 232 or one of each. From 1997 onwards locomotives of classes 211 and 212 were used for operations to Weida; among the most prominent of them was locomotive V 100 1023, which was destroyed in the fire at the DB Museum in Nuremberg in 2005.

Class 218 locomotives were used on the line to haul the Vier-Länder-Express. The Regional-Express services which have run since December 2006 are operated with class 612 sets. The Regionalbahn 103 service is operated with Siemens Desiro Classic (class 642) sets. The Erfurter Bahn uses Stadler Regio-Shuttle RS1 sets.

In freight, a train hauled by a class 203 locomotive, a diesel-electric Siemens ER20 locomotive of the EVU Unterwellenborn steelworks or a Vossloh G 1700 diesel-hydraulic locomotive has run on working days since 2008 from Stahlwerks Thüringen (Thuringian Steel) towards the Czech Republic.
