= Vision1 Racing =

British cycling team

Team information
- UCI code: VOR
- Registered: United Kingdom
- Founded: 2008
- Disbanded: 2009
- Discipline: Road

Key personnel
- General manager: Stefan Wyman

Team name history
- 2008 2009: Swift Racing; Vision1 Racing
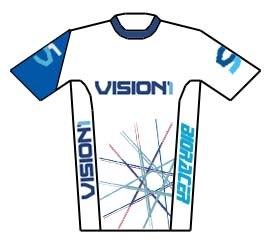
Vision1 Racing jersey
Jersey

Vision1 Racing (UCI Code: VOR) was a professional British cycling team based in Belgium. It was provisionally ranked 11th for the 2009 season, meaning it was invited to all World Cup races.

== Major wins ==
2009
Stage 2 & 3b Emakumeen Euskal Bira, Nicole Cooke
Overall Giro del Trentino Alto Adige - Südtirol, Nicole Cooke

Stage 2, Nicole Cooke

Redmond, Cyclo-cross, Helen Wyman
Saint-Quentin, Cyclo-cross, Christel Ferrier-Bruneau
Döhlau, Cyclo-cross, Helen Wyman
Faè, Cyclo-cross, Helen Wyman
Wetzikon, Cyclo-cross, Helen Wyman

== National champions ==
British National Cyclo-cross Championship, Helen Wyman
France National Road Race Championship, Christel Ferrier-Bruneau
British National Road Race Championships, Nicole Cooke

== Team roster ==
2009

Ages as of 1 January 2009.

Rider	Date of birth
Nicole Cooke (GBR)	13 April 1983 (aged 25)
Katie Curtis (GBR)	1 November 1988 (aged 20)
Gabriella Day (Note: Day left the team on 31 May.) (GBR)	1 December 1984 (aged 24)
Christel Ferrier-Bruneau (FRA)	8 July 1979 (aged 29)
Jacqueline Garner (Note: Garner joined the team on 1 June.) (GBR)	31 October 1989 (aged 19)

Rider	Date of birth
Dani King (GBR)	21 November 1990 (aged 18)
Debby van de Berg (NED)	23 August 1980 (aged 28)
Aurore Verhoeven (FRA)	15 January 1990 (aged 18)
Vicki Whitelaw (AUS)	2 January 1977 (aged 31)
Helen Wyman (Note: Wyman left the team on 31 May.) (GBR)	4 March 1981 (aged 27)
