= Triebes =

Coordinates: 50.686°N 12.023°E

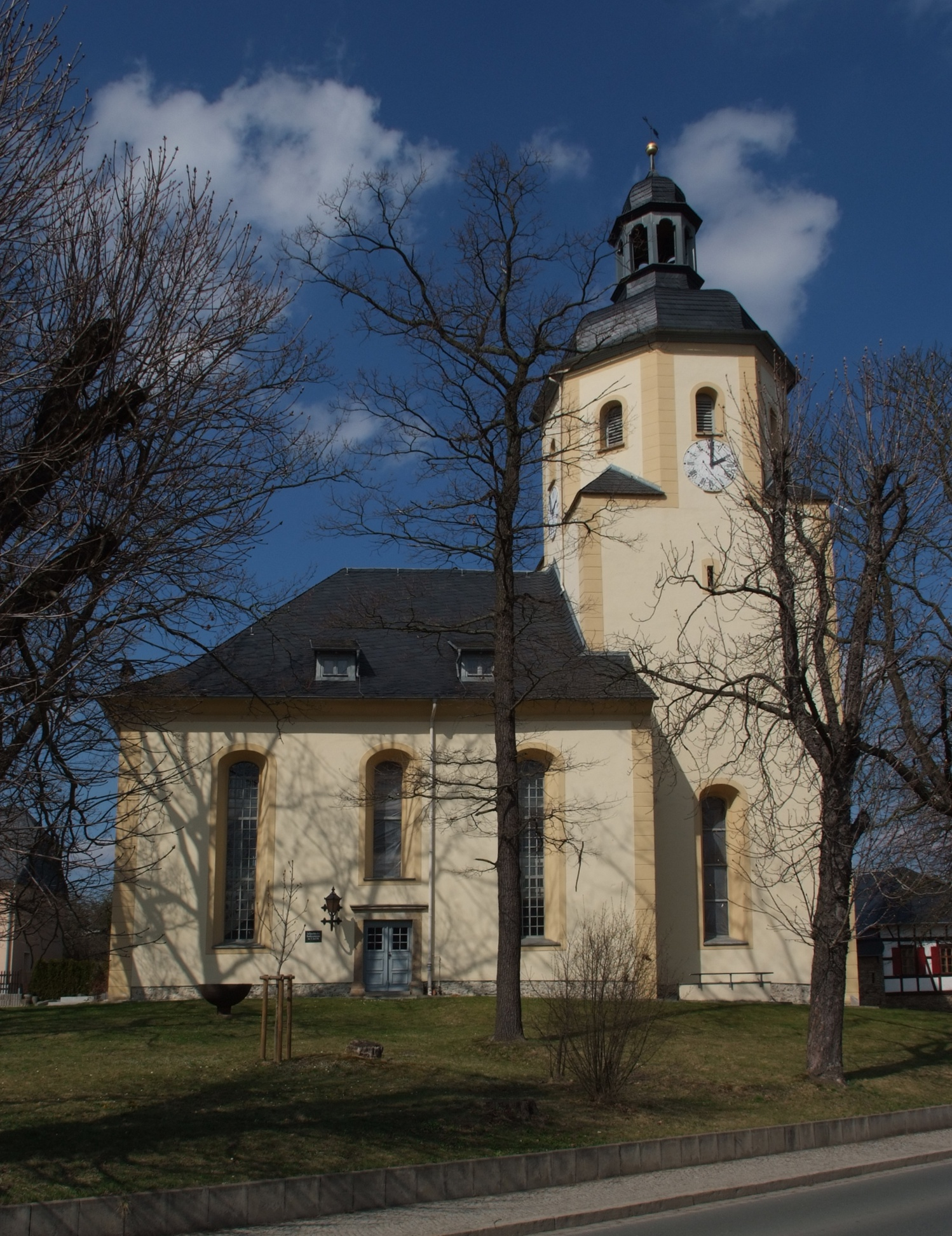
Protestant church

Triebes is a suburb of Zeulenroda-Triebes in Thuringia, Germany.

== History ==
Triebes was mentioned in a document the first time in 1209.

Within the German Empire (1871-1918), Triebes was part or the Principality of Reuss-Gera.

In 2006 Triebes merged with Zeulenroda.
