= List of 2014 UCI Women's Teams and riders =

Listed below are the UCI Women's Teams that competed in 2014 women's road cycling events organized by the International Cycling Union (UCI), including the 2014 UCI Women's Road World Cup.

== Teams overview ==
The country designation of each team is determined by the country of registration of the largest number of its riders, and is not necessarily the country where the team is registered or based.

The 2014 UCI Women's Teams were:

Code	Official Team Name	Country	Website
ALE	Alé–Cipollini (2014 season)	Italy	alecipolliniteam.com
BPK	Astana BePink Women's Team (2014 season)	Italy	bepink.eu
BCT	Bigla Cycling Team (2014 season)	Switzerland	bigla-cycling-team.ch
BPD	Bizkaia–Durango (2014 season)	Spain	duranguesa.com
GPC	China Chongming–Giant–Champion System Pro Cycling (2014 season)	Hong Kong	
DLT	Boels–Dolmans (2014 season)	Netherlands	boelsdolmanscyclingteam.com
BTC	BTC City Ljubljana (2014 season)	Slovenia	kolesarke.si
EMF	Estado de México–Faren Kuota (2014 season)	Mexico	
FFT	Firefighters Upsala CK (2014 season)	Sweden	uppsalacykelcentrum.com
FDA	Forno d'Asolo–Astute (2014 season)	Lithuania	
FTZ	Futurumshop.nl–Zannata (2014 season)	Netherlands	futurumshop-zannata.com
HPU	Hitec Products (2014 season)	Norway	hitecproducts-uck.no
LKT	Lointek (2014 season)	Spain	equipociclistaugeraga.com
LBL	Lotto–Belisol Ladies (2014 season)	Belgium	lottobelisol.be
NOE	No Radunion Vitalogic (2014 season)	Austria	radteam.sportunion.at
OPW	Optum p/b Kelly Benefit Strategies (2014 season)	United States	optumprocycling.com
GEW	Orica–AIS (2014 season)	Australia	greenedgecycling.com
PHV	Parkhotel Valkenburg Continental Team (2014 season)	Netherlands	parkhotelvalkenburgct.nl
RBW	Rabobank-Liv Woman Cycling Team (2014 season)	Netherlands	raboliv.com
RVL	RusVelo (2014 season)	Russia	rusvelo.pro/en
MIC	S.C. Michela Fanini Rox (2014 season)	Italy	michelafanini.com
SEF	Servetto Footon (2014 season)	Italy	atbike.it
SLU	Specialized–lululemon (2014 season)	United States	velociosports.com
GIW	Team Giant–Shimano (2014 season)	Netherlands	1t4i.com
TRY	Team Rytger (2014 season)	Denmark	team-rytger.dk
TIB	Team TIBCO–To The Top (2014 season)	United States	teamtibco.com
TOG	Top Girls Fassa Bortolo (2014 season)	Italy	gstopgirls.com
VLL	Topsport Vlaanderen–Pro-Duo (2014 season)	Belgium	cyclingteam-damesvlaanderen.be
UHC	UnitedHealthcare Women's Team (2014 season)	United States	velociosports.com
VAI	Vaiano Fondriest (2014 season)	Italy	vcvaiano.com
FUT	Poitou–Charentes.Futuroscope.86 (2014 season)	France	cyclisme-vienne-futuroscope.fr
WHT	Wiggle–Honda (2014 season)	United Kingdom	wigglehonda.com

List updated 30 April 2014.

== Riders ==
This is a list of riders riding for the UCI Women's Teams in 2014 sorted by team. For the differences with the 2013 season, see list of women's road cycling transfers 2014.

=== Alé–Cipollini ===
Ages as of 1 January 2014.

Rider	Date of birth
Monia Baccaille (ITA)	10 April 1984 (aged 29)
Elena Berlato (ITA)	2 August 1988 (aged 25)
Ilaria Bonomi (ITA)	13 May 1995 (aged 18)
Valentina Carretta (ITA)	16 September 1989 (aged 24)
Barbara Guarischi (ITA)	10 February 1990 (aged 23)
Tatiana Guderzo (ITA)	22 August 1984 (aged 29)

Rider	Date of birth
Małgorzata Jasińska (POL)	18 January 1984 (aged 29)
Shelley Olds (USA)	30 September 1980 (aged 33)
Michela Pavin (ITA)	15 July 1994 (aged 19)
Carla Ryan (AUS)	21 September 1985 (aged 28)
Ane Santesteban (ESP)	12 December 1990 (aged 23)
Marta Tagliaferro (ITA)	4 November 1989 (aged 24)

=== Astana BePink Women's Team ===
Ages as of 1 January 2014 As of April 2014.

Rider	Date of birth
Alice Algisi (ITA)	10 March 1993 (aged 20)
Alena Amialiusik (BLR)	6 February 1989 (aged 24)
Alice Maria Arzuffi (ITA)	19 November 1994 (aged 19)
Ana Maria Covrig (ITA)	12 August 1994 (aged 19)
Michela Maltese (ITA)	20 April 1995 (aged 18)
Simona Frapporti (ITA)	14 July 1988 (aged 25)
Anna Zita Maria Stricker (ITA)	3 July 1994 (aged 19)

Rider	Date of birth
Dalia Muccioli (ITA)	22 May 1993 (aged 20)
Susanna Zorzi (ITA)	13 March 1992 (aged 21)
Doris Schweizer (SUI)	28 August 1989 (aged 24)
Silvia Valsecchi (ITA)	19 July 1982 (aged 31)
Marzahan Baitleuova (KAZ)	12 March 1994 (aged 19)
Kseniia Dobrynina (RUS)	11 January 1994 (aged 19)
Mahabbat Umutzhanova (KAZ)	11 August 1994 (aged 19)

=== Bigla Cycling Team ===
As of 1 January 2014. Ages as of 1 January 2014.

Rider	Date of birth
Emilie Aubry (SUI)	16 February 1989 (aged 24)
Désirée Ehrler (SUI)	20 August 1991 (aged 22)
Elke Gebhardt (GER)	22 July 1983 (aged 30)
Jacqueline Hahn (AUT)	21 July 1991 (aged 22)
Nicole Hanselmann (SUI)	6 May 1991 (aged 22)
Taryn Heather (AUS)	31 August 1982 (aged 31)

Rider	Date of birth
Joanne Hogan (AUS)	9 June 1982 (aged 31)
Katarína Hranaiová (CZE)	27 January 1984 (aged 29)
Vera Koedooder (NED)	31 October 1983 (aged 30)
Lotta Lepistö (FIN)	28 June 1989 (aged 24)
Sandra Weiss (SUI)	27 February 1991 (aged 22)
Martina Zwick (GER)	12 December 1989 (aged 24)

=== Bizkaia–Durango ===
Ages as of 1 January 2014.

Rider	Date of birth
Dorleta Eskamendi Gil (ESP)	2 January 1992 (aged 21)
Yulia Ilinykh (RUS)	6 October 1985 (aged 28)
Veronika Kormos (HUN)	17 August 1992 (aged 21)
Lierni Lekuona Etxebeste (ESP)	8 April 1995 (aged 18)
Amaia Martioda (ESP)	12 May 1990 (aged 23)
Mayalen Noriega (ESP)	19 February 1982 (aged 31)
Lourdes Oyarbide Jimenez (ESP)	8 April 1994 (aged 19)

Rider	Date of birth
Anna Ramírez (ESP)	14 March 1981 (aged 32)
Irene San Sebastián Lasa (ESP)	21 February 1990 (aged 23)
Ainara Sanz (ESP)	15 January 1995 (aged 18)
Samara Sheppard (NZL)	25 June 1990 (aged 23)
Leire Olaberria Dorronsoro (ESP)	17 February 1977 (aged 36)
Minami Uwano (JPN)	18 May 1991 (aged 22)

=== China Chongming–Giant–Champion System Pro Cycling ===
Ages as of 1 January 2014.

Rider	Date of birth
Guo Lin Fang (CHN)	16 May 1992 (aged 21)
Huang Dongyan (CHN)	14 December 1993 (aged 20)
Huang Li (CHN)	23 December 1988 (aged 25)
Jiang Xiujie (CHN)	5 January 1989 (aged 24)
Liang Hongyu (CHN)	23 October 1990 (aged 23)
Liu Dexiang (CHN)	20 January 1993 (aged 20)
Luo Xiaoling (CHN)	20 September 1988 (aged 25)
Ruan Yue Min (CHN)	19 October 1993 (aged 20)

Rider	Date of birth
Song Niman (CHN)	21 December 1990 (aged 23)
Tian Yuanyuan (CHN)	3 July 1992 (aged 21)
Wong Wan Yiu Jamie (HKG)	4 November 1986 (aged 27)
Yan Wei Na (CHN)	12 December 1991 (aged 22)
Zhang Nan (CHN)	5 March 1989 (aged 24)
Zhang Yuzhuo (CHN)	6 December 1987 (aged 26)
Zhao Xi Sha (CHN)	28 September 1992 (aged 21)

=== Boels–Dolmans Cycling Team ===
As of 1 March 2014. Ages as of 1 January 2014.

Rider	Date of birth
Lizzie Armitstead (GBR)	18 December 1988 (aged 25)
Jessie Daams (BEL)	28 May 1990 (aged 23)
Ellen van Dijk (NED)	11 February 1987 (aged 26)
Janneke Ensing (NED)	21 September 1986 (aged 27)
Megan Guarnier (USA)	4 May 1985 (aged 28)
Demi de Jong (NED)	11 February 1995 (aged 18)
Sanne van Paassen (Note: Van Paassen joined the team on 1 March.) (NED)	27 October 1988 (aged 25)

Rider	Date of birth
Romy Kasper (GER)	5 May 1988 (aged 25)
Nina Kessler (NED)	4 July 1988 (aged 25)
Christine Majerus (LUX)	25 February 1987 (aged 26)
Katarzyna Pawłowska (POL)	16 August 1989 (aged 24)
Emma Trott (Note: Trott retired on 11 May) (GBR)	24 December 1989 (aged 24)
Marieke van Wanroij (NED)	5 July 1979 (aged 34)
Nicky Zijlaard (NED)	21 November 1995 (aged 18)

=== BTC City Ljubljana ===
Ages as of 1 January 2014.

Rider	Date of birth
Polona Batagelj (SLO)	7 June 1989 (aged 24)
Eugenia Bujak (POL)	25 June 1989 (aged 24)
Sara Frece (SLO)	17 February 1984 (aged 29)
Urska Kalan (SLO)	25 March 1994 (aged 19)
Špela Kern (SLO)	24 February 1990 (aged 23)
Alenka Novak (SLO)	17 August 1977 (aged 36)

Rider	Date of birth
Urša Pintar (SLO)	3 October 1985 (aged 28)
Mia Radotić (CRO)	2 December 1984 (aged 29)
Martina Ritter (AUT)	23 September 1982 (aged 31)
Anja Rugelj (SLO)	25 June 1986 (aged 27)
Rutar Tjasa (SLO)	10 December 1984 (aged 29)
Elena Valentini (ITA)	30 March 1992 (aged 21)

=== Estado de México–Faren Kuota ===
Ages as of 1 January 2014.

Rider	Date of birth
Uênia Fernandes de Souza (BRA)	12 August 1984 (aged 29)
Lucy Martin (GBR)	5 May 1990 (aged 23)
Arianna Fidanza (ITA)	6 January 1995 (aged 18)
Anna Trevisi (ITA)	8 May 1992 (aged 21)
Fabiana Luperini (ITA)	14 January 1974 (aged 39)
Giada Borgato (ITA)	15 June 1989 (aged 24)
Rossella Ratto (ITA)	20 October 1993 (aged 20)
Elena Cecchini (ITA)	25 May 1992 (aged 21)
Maria Giulia Confalonieri (ITA)	30 March 1993 (aged 20)

Rider	Date of birth
Erika Yépez (MEX)	6 May 1990 (aged 23)
Melissa Ayala (MEX)	7 June 1991 (aged 22)
Dulce Pliego (MEX)	8 August 1986 (aged 27)
Ana Teresa Casas Bonilla (MEX)	8 November 1991 (aged 22)
Marcela Prieto (MEX)	11 March 1992 (aged 21)
Iliana Romero (MEX)	15 October 1989 (aged 24)
Giuseppina Grassi (MEX)	29 August 1976 (aged 37)
Carolina Rodriguez Gutierrez (MEX)	30 September 1993 (aged 20)

=== Forno d'Asolo–Astute ===
Ages as of 1 January 2014.

Rider	Date of birth
Rossella Callovi (ITA)	5 April 1991 (aged 22)
Íngrid Drexel (MEX)	28 July 1993 (aged 20)
Edita Janeliūnaitė (LTU)	16 December 1988 (aged 25)
Milda Jankauskaitė (LTU)	1 October 1995 (aged 18)
Reda Kaulinskaite (LTU)	28 December 1995 (aged 18)
Jurgita Kubiliunaite (LTU)	26 August 1995 (aged 18)
Silvija Latozaite (LTU)	20 November 1993 (aged 20)
Jessenia Meneses (COL)	18 June 1995 (aged 18)

Rider	Date of birth
Laura Lorenza Morfin Macouzet (MEX)	9 January 1982 (aged 31)
Olena Novikova (UKR)	14 January 1983 (aged 30)
Olena Oliinyk (UKR)	3 May 1989 (aged 24)
Valeria Pintos (ARG)	17 November 1979 (aged 34)
Martina Růžičková (CZE)	22 March 1980 (aged 33)
Alena Sitsko (BLR)	4 December 1987 (aged 26)
Daiva Tušlaitė (LTU)	18 June 1986 (aged 27)
Lorena María Vargas Villamil (COL)	27 August 1986 (aged 27)

=== Futurumshop.nl–Zannata ===
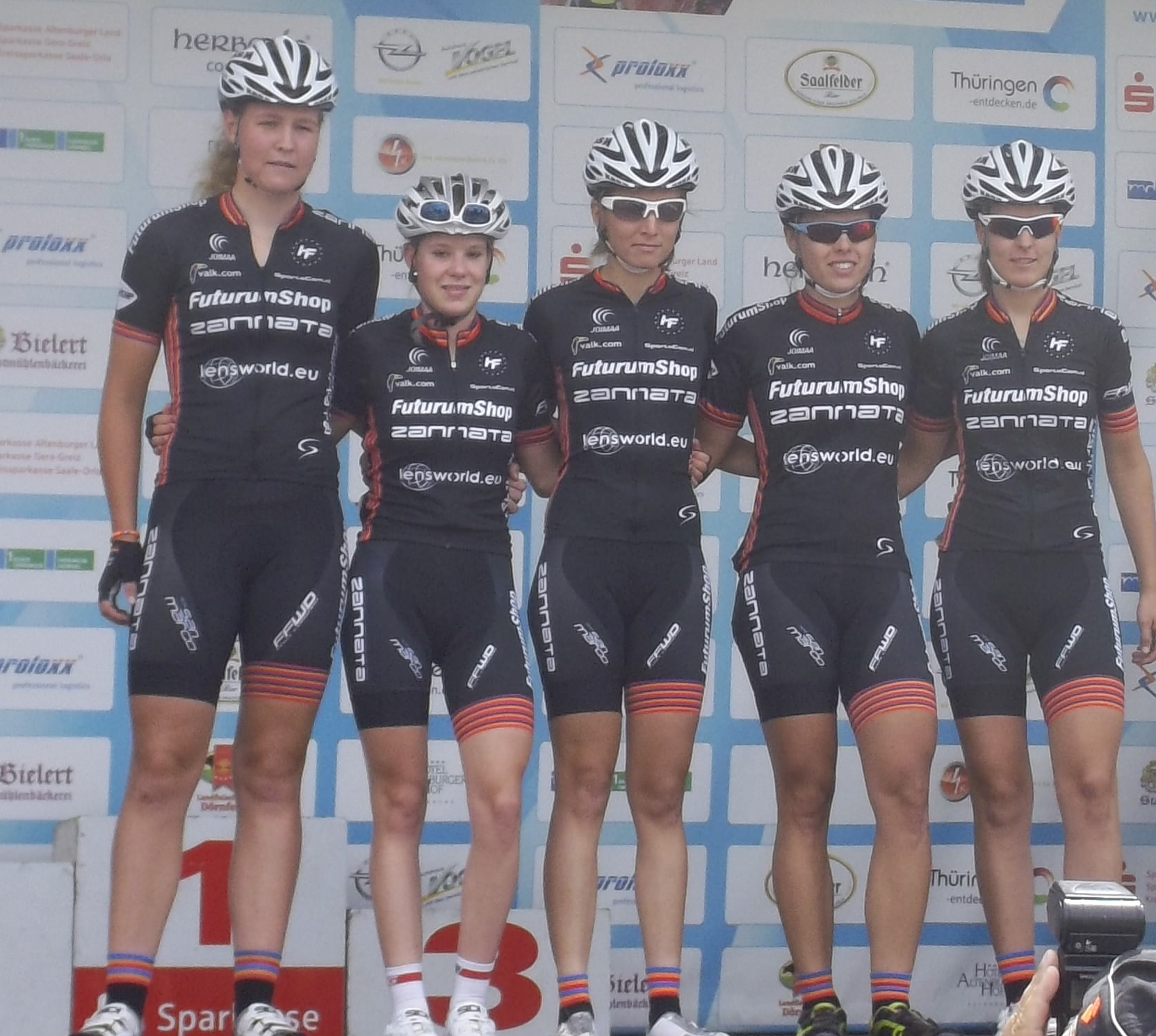
Five riders of the team at the 2014 Thüringen Rundfahrt der Frauen.

Ages as of 1 January 2014.

Rider	Date of birth
Latoya Brulee (BEL)	9 December 1988 (aged 25)
Kirsten Coppens (NED)	16 September 1994 (aged 19)
Sofie De Vuyst (BEL)	2 April 1987 (aged 26)
Annelies Dom (BEL)	8 April 1986 (aged 27)
Anouska Koster (NED)	20 August 1993 (aged 20)
Mieke Kröger (GER)	18 July 1993 (aged 20)

Rider	Date of birth
Evy Kuijpers (NED)	15 February 1995 (aged 18)
Daniella Moonen (NED)	9 December 1977 (aged 36)
Mascha Pijnenborg (NED)	30 June 1981 (aged 32)
Janine van der Meer (NED)	17 February 1994 (aged 19)
Annelies Van Doorslaer (BEL)	15 January 1989 (aged 24)
Grace Verbeke (BEL)	12 November 1984 (aged 29)

=== Hitec Products ===
Roster in 2014, ages as of 1 January 2014:

Rider	Date of birth
Miriam Bjørnsrud (NOR)	9 October 1992 (aged 21)
Audrey Cordon (FRA)	22 September 1989 (aged 24)
Vita Heine (NOR)	21 November 1984 (aged 29)
Chloe Hosking (AUS)	1 October 1990 (aged 23)
Cecilie Gotaas Johnsen (NOR)	20 April 1976 (aged 37)
Lauren Kitchen (AUS)	21 November 1990 (aged 23)
Julie Leth (DEN)	13 July 1992 (aged 21)

Rider	Date of birth
Tone Hatteland Lima (NOR)	18 December 1979 (aged 34)
Elisa Longo Borghini (ITA)	10 December 1991 (aged 22)
Siri Minge (NOR)	4 February 1994 (aged 19)
Emilie Moberg (NOR)	12 July 1991 (aged 22)
Ashleigh Moolman (RSA)	9 December 1985 (aged 28)
Sara Olsson (SWE)	6 March 1990 (aged 23)
Thea Thorsen (NOR)	15 March 1992 (aged 21)

=== Lointek ===
Ages as of 1 January 2014.

Rider	Date of birth
Aude Biannic (FRA)	27 March 1991 (aged 22)
Alicia González Blanco (ESP)	27 May 1995 (aged 18)
Sheyla Gutiérrez Ruiz (ESP)	1 January 1994 (aged 20)
Mélodie Lesueur (FRA)	12 March 1990 (aged 23)
Belén López Morales (ESP)	18 April 1984 (aged 29)
Eider Merino Kortazar (ESP)	2 August 1994 (aged 19)

Rider	Date of birth
Fanny Riberot (FRA)	17 March 1983 (aged 30)
Irene Usabiaga Balerdi (ESP)	22 September 1993 (aged 20)
Aurore Verhoeven (FRA)	15 January 1990 (aged 23)
Eugénie Duval (FRA)	3 May 1993 (aged 20)
Lucía González Blanco (ESP)	9 July 1990 (aged 23)
Aida Nuno (ESP)	24 November 1983 (aged 30)

=== Lotto–Belisol Ladies ===
Ages as of 1 January 2014.

Rider	Date of birth
Isabelle Beckers (BEL)	4 March 1983 (aged 30)
Amy Cure (AUS)	31 December 1992 (aged 21)
Heidi Dalton (RSA)	21 March 1995 (aged 18)
Liesbet De Vocht (BEL)	5 January 1979 (aged 34)
Lieselot Decroix (BEL)	12 May 1987 (aged 26)
Jolien D'Hoore (BEL)	14 March 1990 (aged 23)
Chantal Hoffmann (LUX)	30 October 1987 (aged 26)
Molly Meyvisch (BEL)	27 October 1995 (aged 18)

Rider	Date of birth
Joëlle Numainville (CAN)	20 November 1987 (aged 26)
Emma Pooley (GBR)	3 October 1982 (aged 31)
Sarah Rijkes (AUT)	2 April 1991 (aged 22)
Marion Rousse (FRA)	17 August 1991 (aged 22)
Isabelle Söderberg (SWE)	28 May 1989 (aged 24)
Céline Van Steveren (BEL)	17 September 1993 (aged 20)
Anisha Vekemans (BEL)	17 August 1991 (aged 22)
Sara Verhaest (BEL)	13 December 1995 (aged 18)

=== No Radunion Vitalogic ===
Roster in 2014, ages as of 1 January 2014:

Rider	Date of birth
Pelin Cizgin (AUT)	29 April 1986 (aged 27)
Astrid Gassner (AUT)	30 October 1995 (aged 18)
Christina Perchtold (AUT)	11 May 1993 (aged 20)
Elisabeth Riegler (AUT)	19 February 1995 (aged 18)

Rider	Date of birth
Brigitte Stocker (AUT)	3 May 1975 (aged 38)
Stephanie Strobl (AUT)	19 February 1995 (aged 18)
Alisa Van Oijen (AUT)	1 October 1992 (aged 21)
Eva Wutti (AUT)	26 February 1989 (aged 24)

=== Optum p/b Kelly Benefit Strategies ===
Ages as of 1 January 2014.

Rider	Date of birth
Annie Ewart (CAN)	29 September 1993 (aged 20)
Lauren Hall (USA)	2 February 1979 (aged 34)
Janel Holcomb (USA)	2 December 1978 (aged 35)
Maura Kinsella (USA)	8 July 1991 (aged 22)
Leah Kirchmann (CAN)	30 June 1990 (aged 23)

Rider	Date of birth
Courteney Lowe (NZL)	26 March 1991 (aged 22)
Amber Pierce (USA)	25 March 1981 (aged 32)
Denise Ramsden (CAN)	21 November 1990 (aged 23)
Brianna Walle (USA)	25 April 1984 (aged 29)
Jade Wilcoxson (USA)	17 April 1978 (aged 35)

=== Orica–AIS ===
Ages as of 1 January 2014.

Rider	Date of birth
Annette Edmondson (AUS)	12 December 1991 (aged 22)
Gracie Elvin (AUS)	31 October 1988 (aged 25)
Katrin Garfoot (from 17/6)* (AUS)	8 October 1981 (aged 32)
Shara Gillow (AUS)	23 December 1987 (aged 26)
Loes Gunnewijk (NED)	27 November 1980 (aged 33)
Melissa Hoskins (AUS)	24 February 1991 (aged 22)

Rider	Date of birth
Emma Johansson (SWE)	23 September 1983 (aged 30)
Jessie MacLean (AUS)	17 October 1985 (aged 28)
Valentina Scandolara (ITA)	1 May 1990 (aged 23)
Amanda Spratt (AUS)	17 September 1987 (aged 26)
Grace Sulzberger (AUS)	18 December 1988 (aged 25)
Carlee Taylor (AUS)	15 February 1989 (aged 24)

*On 17 June, the team announced the signing of Katrin Garfoot for the remainder of the 2014 season.

=== Parkhotel Valkenburg Continental Team ===
As of 1 January 2014. Ages as of 1 January 2014.

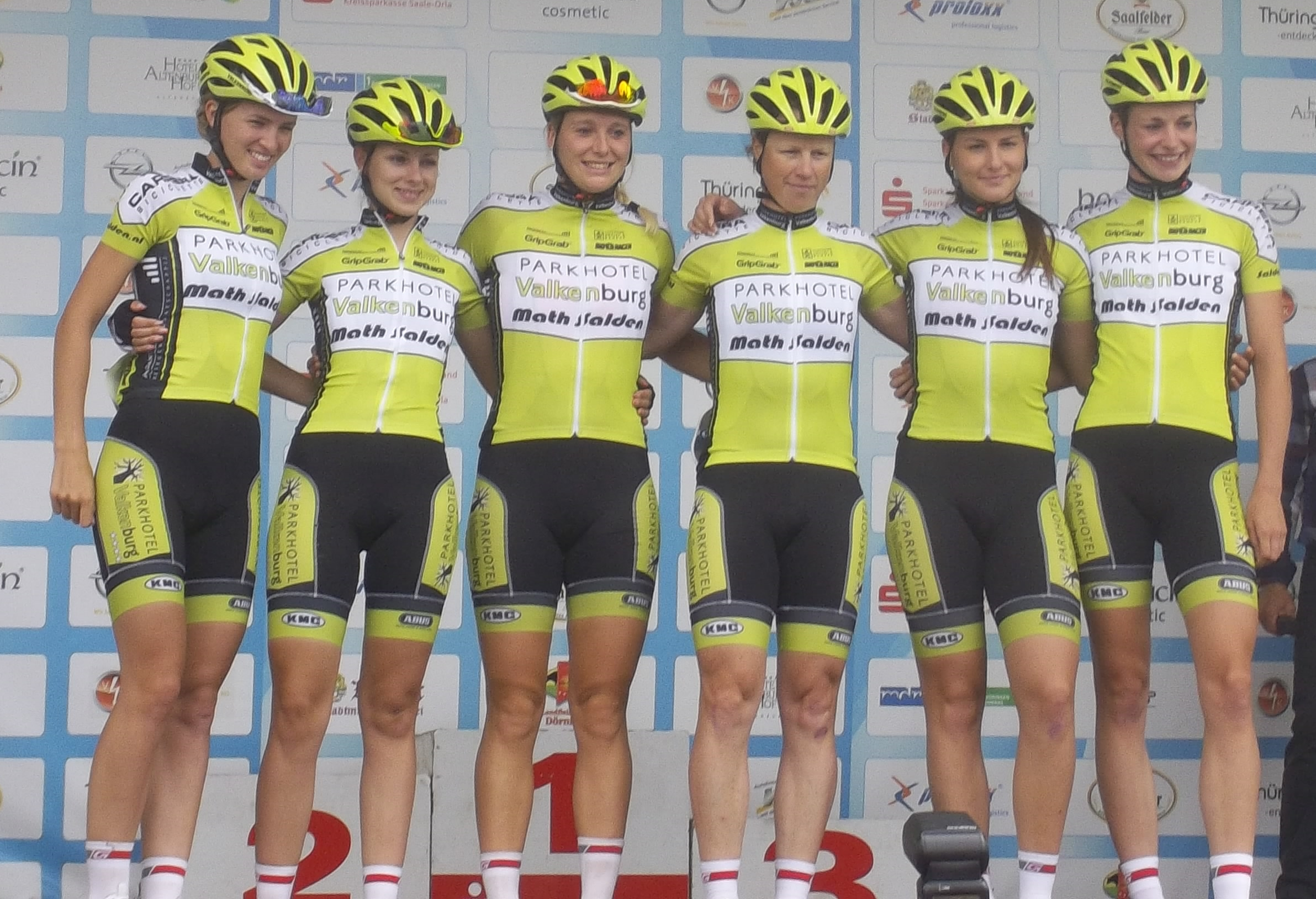
Six riders of the team at the 2014 Thüringen Rundfahrt der Frauen.

Rider	Date of birth
Kim de Baat (NED)	29 May 1991 (aged 22)
Sophie de Boer (NED)	12 December 1990 (aged 23)
Aafke Eshuis (NED)	24 November 1987 (aged 26)
Natalie van Gogh (NED)	14 September 1974 (aged 39)
Bianca van den Hoek (NED)	28 July 1976 (aged 37)
Ilona Hoeksma (NED)	22 May 1991 (aged 22)
Riejanne Markus (NED)	1 September 1994 (aged 19)
Marissa Otten (NED)	11 July 1989 (aged 24)

Rider	Date of birth
Kirsten Peetoom (NED)	1 October 1981 (aged 32)
Jermaine Post (NED)	10 June 1992 (aged 21)
Monique van de Ree (NED)	2 March 1988 (aged 25)
Pauliena Rooijakkers (Note: Rooijakkers joined the team on 9 February.) (NED)	12 May 1993 (aged 20)
Rozanne Slik (NED)	12 April 1991 (aged 22)
Lisanne Soemanta (NED)	1 May 1987 (aged 26)
Esra Tromp (NED)	15 October 1990 (aged 23)

=== Rabo–Liv Women Cycling Team ===
Ages as of 1 January 2014

Rider	Date of birth
Lucinda Brand (NED)	22 October 1989 (aged 24)
Thalita de Jong (NED)	11 June 1993 (aged 20)
Pauline Ferrand-Prévot (FRA)	10 February 1992 (aged 21)
Anna Knauer (GER)	20 February 1990 (aged 23)
Roxane Knetemann (NED)	1 April 1987 (aged 26)
Katarzyna Niewiadoma (POL)	29 September 1994 (aged 19)

Rider	Date of birth
Iris Slappendel (NED)	18 February 1985 (aged 28)
Sabrina Stultiens (NED)	8 July 1993 (aged 20)
Anna van der Breggen (NED)	18 April 1990 (aged 23)
Annemiek van Vleuten (NED)	8 October 1982 (aged 31)
Marianne Vos (NED)	13 May 1987 (aged 26)

=== RusVelo ===
Ages as of 1 January 2014.

Rider	Date of birth
Aizhan Zhaparova (RUS)	1 May 1989 (aged 24)
Anastasia Chulkova (RUS)	7 March 1985 (aged 28)
Olga Zabelinskaya (RUS)	10 May 1980 (aged 33)
Vera Andreeva (RUS)	10 May 1988 (aged 25)
Nadezhda Antonova (RUS)	10 August 1994 (aged 19)
Irina Kalentieva (RUS)	10 November 1977 (aged 36)
Elena Kuchinskaya (RUS)	11 December 1984 (aged 29)
Yulia Blindyuk (RUS)	11 December 1984 (aged 29)

Rider	Date of birth
Alexandra Burchenkova (RUS)	16 September 1988 (aged 25)
Kristina Kirillova (RUS)	21 February 1995 (aged 18)
Maria Savitskaya (RUS)	22 April 1991 (aged 22)
Ekateryna Anoshina (RUS)	26 April 1991 (aged 22)
Tatiana Antoshina (RUS)	27 July 1982 (aged 31)
Oxana Kozonchuk (RUS)	28 May 1988 (aged 25)
Eva Lechner (ITA)	1 July 1985 (aged 28)
Inga Čilvinaitė (LTU)	14 February 1986 (aged 27)

=== S.C. Michela Fanini Rox ===
As of 8 January 2014.

Rider	Date of birth
Michela Balducci (ITA)	30 July 1995 (age 31)
Vittoria Bussi (ITA)	19 March 1987 (age 39)
Simona Crotti (ITA)	16 August 1995 (age 31)
Azzurra D'Intino (ITA)	25 October 1991 (age 35)
Mireia Epelde (ESP)	6 January 1987 (age 39)

Rider	Date of birth
Edwige Pitel (FRA)	4 June 1967 (age 59)
Liisi Rist (EST)	25 June 1991 (age 35)
Lara Vieceli (ITA)	16 July 1993 (age 33)
Yevheniya Vysotska (UKR)	11 December 1975 (age 50)

=== Servetto Footon ===
Ages as of 1 January 2014.

Rider	Date of birth
Simona Bortolotti (ITA)	6 December 1994 (aged 19)
Natalia Boyarskaya (RUS)	27 February 1983 (aged 30)
Elisabet Bru Clotet (ESP)	17 April 1995 (aged 18)
Veronica Cornolti (ITA)	30 December 1994 (aged 19)
Annalisa Cucinotta (ITA)	4 March 1986 (aged 27)
Marina Lari (ITA)	5 June 1989 (aged 24)
Marina Likhanova (RUS)	27 October 1990 (aged 23)

Rider	Date of birth
Emma Marcelli (ITA)	28 December 1985 (aged 28)
Giovanna Michieletto (ITA)	18 March 1995 (aged 18)
Anna Potokina (RUS)	18 June 1987 (aged 26)
Sari Saarelainen (FIN)	1 March 1981 (aged 32)
Svetlana Stolbova (RUS)	2 January 1973 (aged 40)
Maria Adele Tuia (ITA)	10 November 1983 (aged 30)

=== Specialized–lululemon ===
As of 1 January 2014. Ages as of 1 January 2014.

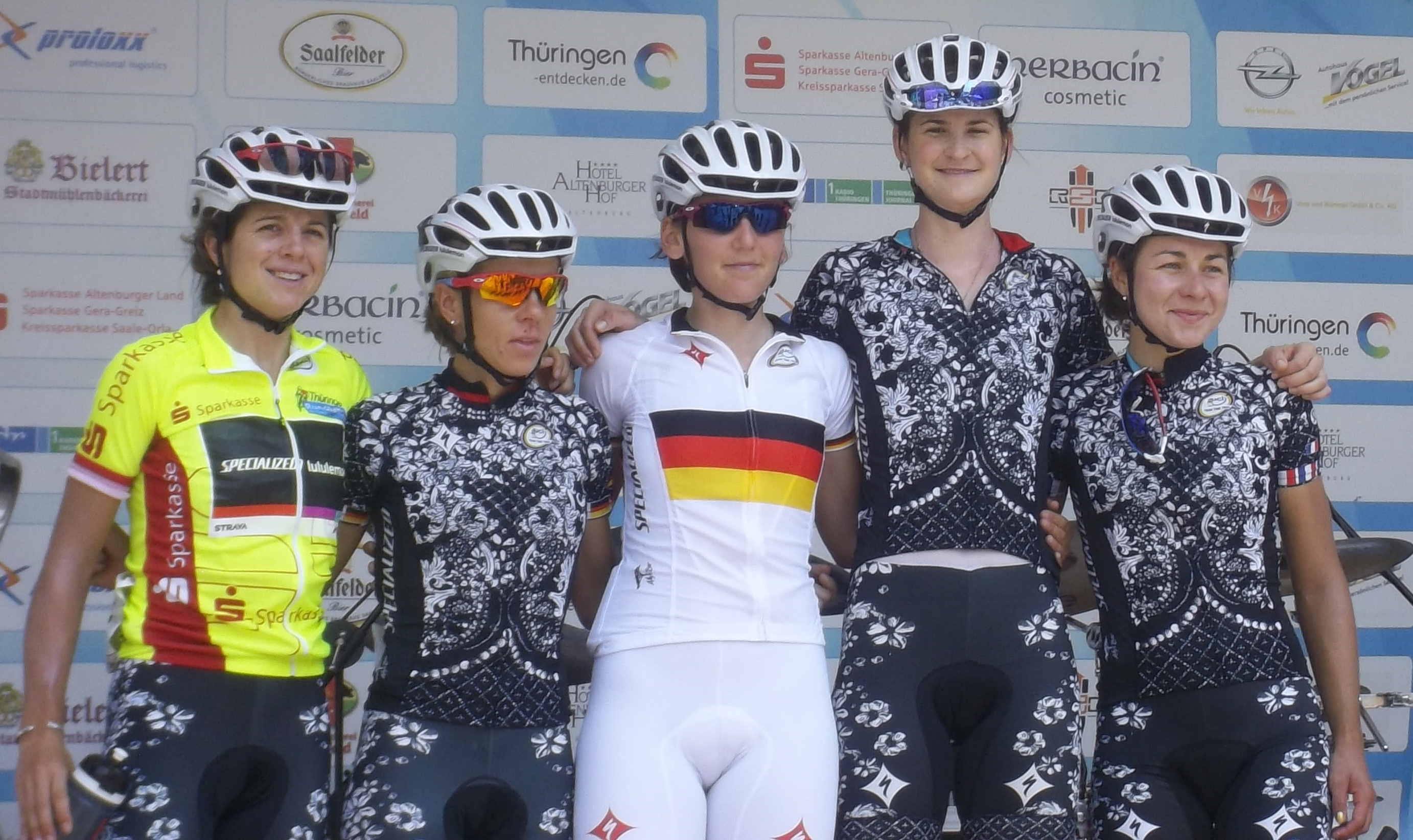
Five riders of the team at the 2014 Thüringen Rundfahrt der Frauen.

Rider	Date of birth
Chantal Blaak (NED)	22 October 1989 (aged 24)
Lisa Brennauer (GER)	8 June 1988 (aged 25)
Karol-Ann Canuel (CAN)	18 April 1988 (aged 25)
Tiffany Cromwell (AUS)	6 July 1988 (aged 25)
Élise Delzenne (FRA)	28 January 1989 (aged 24)
Loren Rowney (AUS)	14 October 1988 (aged 25)

Rider	Date of birth
Carmen Small (USA)	20 April 1980 (aged 33)
Ally Stacher (USA)	8 June 1987 (aged 26)
Evelyn Stevens (USA)	9 May 1983 (aged 30)
Tayler Wiles (USA)	20 July 1989 (aged 24)
Trixi Worrack (GER)	28 September 1981 (aged 32)

=== Team Giant–Shimano ===
As of 1 January 2014. Ages as of 1 January 2014.

Rider	Date of birth
Marijn de Vries (NED)	19 November 1978 (aged 35)
Lucy Garner (GBR)	20 September 1994 (aged 19)
Claudia Häusler (GER)	17 November 1985 (aged 28)
Willeke Knol (NED)	10 April 1991 (aged 22)
Floortje Mackaij (NED)	18 October 1995 (aged 18)

Rider	Date of birth
Sara Mustonen (SWE)	8 February 1981 (aged 32)
Maaike Polspoel (BEL)	28 March 1989 (aged 24)
Julia Soek (NED)	12 December 1990 (aged 23)
Kyara Stijns (NED)	9 October 1995 (aged 18)
Kirsten Wild (NED)	15 October 1982 (aged 31)

=== Team Rytger ===
Roster in 2014, ages as of 1 January 2014:

Rider	Date of birth
Julie Valgren Andersen (DEN)	15 June 1994 (aged 19)
Hanna Helamb (SWE)	30 March 1994 (aged 19)
Cecilie Uttrup Ludwig (DEN)	23 August 1995 (aged 18)
Rikke Lønne (DEN)	3 March 1988 (aged 25)
Kelly Markus (DEN)	7 February 1993 (aged 20)
Malin Kristina Nystrand (SWE)	21 April 1995 (aged 18)

Rider	Date of birth
Anna Pålsson (SWE)	20 September 1994 (aged 19)
Nina Schultz Nielsen (DEN)	9 June 1993 (aged 20)
Melanie Späth (IRL)	16 June 1981 (aged 32)
Kamilla Sofie Vallin (DEN)	18 August 1993 (aged 20)
Henriette Woering (NED)	18 January 1992 (aged 21)

=== TIBCO / To The Top ===
Ages as of 1 January 2014.

Rider	Date of birth
Alizée Brien (CAN)	27 September 1993 (aged 20)
Krista Doebel-Hickok (USA)	28 April 1989 (aged 24)
Andrea Dvorak (USA)	9 October 1980 (aged 33)
Jasmin Glaesser (GER)	8 July 1992 (aged 21)
Emma Grant (GBR)	30 September 1991 (aged 22)
Sara Headley (USA)	5 April 1985 (aged 28)
Joanne Kiesanowski (NZL)	24 May 1979 (aged 34)

Rider	Date of birth
Amanda Miller (USA)	13 December 1986 (aged 27)
Kendall Ryan (USA)	10 August 1992 (aged 21)
Samantha Schneider (USA)	18 September 1990 (aged 23)
Patricia Schwager (SUI)	6 December 1983 (aged 30)
Lauren Stephens (USA)	28 December 1986 (aged 27)
Anika Todd (CAN)	11 March 1990 (aged 23)

=== Top Girls Fassa Bortolo ===
As of 8 January 2014.

Rider	Date of birth
Irene Bitto (ITA)	3 November 1993 (age 33)
Francesca Cauz (ITA)	24 September 1992 (age 34)
Silvia Cecchini (ITA)	10 May 1994 (age 32)
Jennifer Fiori (ITA)	23 March 1986 (age 40)
Sara Grifi (ITA)	26 August 1988 (age 38)

Rider	Date of birth
Natasha Grillo (ITA)	17 November 1995 (age 31)
Soraya Paladin (ITA)	5 April 1993 (age 33)
Asja Paladin (ITA)	27 September 1994 (age 32)
Chiara Pierobon (ITA)	21 January 1993 (age 33)

=== Topsport Vlaanderen–Pro-Duo ===
Ages as of 1 January 2014.

Rider	Date of birth
Evelyn Arys (BEL)	21 July 1990 (aged 23)
Els Belmans (BEL)	30 March 1983 (aged 30)
Gilke Croket (BEL)	1 November 1992 (aged 21)
Nel De Crits (BEL)	9 April 1991 (aged 22)
Demmy Druyts (BEL)	4 October 1995 (aged 18)

Rider	Date of birth
Jessy Druyts (BEL)	22 January 1994 (aged 19)
Kelly Druyts (BEL)	21 October 1989 (aged 24)
Kaat Hannes (BEL)	21 November 1991 (aged 22)
Lotte Kopecky (BEL)	10 November 1995 (aged 18)
Kelly Van Der Steen (BEL)	1 September 1995 (aged 18)

=== UnitedHealthcare Women's Team ===
As of 5 January 2014.

Rider	Date of birth
Mara Abbott (USA)	14 November 1985 (age 41)
Hannah Barnes (GBR)	4 May 1993 (age 33)
Rushlee Buchanan (NZL)	20 January 1988 (age 38)
Jacquelyn Crowell (USA)	16 February 1988 (age 38)
Katie Hall (USA)	6 January 1987 (age 39)
Cari Higgins (USA)	5 October 1976 (age 50)

Rider	Date of birth
Sharon Laws (GBR)	7 July 1974 (age 52)
Alison Powers (USA)	14 December 1979 (age 46)
Coryn Rivera (USA)	26 August 1992 (age 34)
Alexis Ryan (USA)	18 August 1994 (age 32)
Lauren Tamayo (USA)	25 October 1983 (age 43)
Ruth Winder (USA)	9 July 1993 (age 33)

=== Vaiano Fondriest ===
Ages as of 1 January 2014.

Rider	Date of birth
Carlotta Brui (ITA)	25 May 1994 (aged 19)
Sérika Gulumá Ortiz (COL)	16 July 1990 (aged 23)
Sylwia Kapusta (POL)	8 December 1982 (aged 31)
Lija Laizāne (LAT)	6 July 1993 (aged 20)
Alessia Martini (ITA)	10 January 1992 (aged 21)
Jessica Parra (COL)	10 August 1995 (aged 18)

Rider	Date of birth
Rasa Pocyte (LTU)	16 August 1995 (aged 18)
Miriam Romei (ITA)	22 November 1995 (aged 18)
Kataržina Sosna (LTU)	30 November 1990 (aged 23)
Ewelina Szybiak (POL)	13 September 1989 (aged 24)
Chiara Vannucci (ITA)	25 October 1993 (aged 20)

=== Poitou–Charentes.Futuroscope.86 ===
Ages as of 1 January 2014.

Rider	Date of birth
Kimberley Wells (AUS)	18 July 1985 (aged 28)
Sarah Roy (AUS)	27 February 1986 (aged 27)
Gabrielle Pilote Fortin (CAN)	26 April 1993 (aged 20)
Pascale Jeuland (FRA)	2 June 1987 (aged 26)
Roxane Fournier (FRA)	7 November 1991 (aged 22)
Charlotte Bravard (FRA)	12 January 1992 (aged 21)

Rider	Date of birth
Sandrine Bideau (FRA)	12 April 1989 (aged 24)
Amélie Rivat (FRA)	14 November 1989 (aged 24)
Oriane Chaumet (FRA)	16 September 1993 (aged 20)
Lucie Pader (FRA)	21 December 1992 (aged 21)
Fiona Dutriaux (FRA)	25 January 1989 (aged 24)
Manon Souyris (FRA)	30 June 1993 (aged 20)

=== Wiggle–Honda ===
Ages as of 1 January 2014

Rider	Date of birth
Elinor Barker (GBR)	7 September 1994 (age 32)
Beatrice Bartelloni (ITA)	5 February 1993 (age 33)
Charlotte Becker (GER)	19 May 1983 (age 43)
Kathryn Bertine (Note: Bertine joined the team on 1 July.) (SKN)	11 May 1975 (age 51)
Giorgia Bronzini (ITA)	3 August 1983 (age 43)
Emily Collins (NZL)	16 September 1990 (age 36)
Emilia Fahlin (SWE)	24 October 1988 (age 38)
Rochelle Gilmore (AUS)	14 December 1981 (age 44)
Mayuko Hagiwara (JPN)	16 October 1986 (age 40)

Rider	Date of birth
Dani King (GBR)	21 November 1990 (age 35)
Peta Mullens (AUS)	8 March 1988 (age 38)
Amy Roberts (GBR)	24 December 1994 (age 31)
Joanna Rowsell (GBR)	5 December 1988 (age 37)
Anna Sanchis (ESP)	18 October 1987 (age 39)
Anna-Bianca Schnitzmeier (GER)	27 July 1990 (age 36)
Laura Trott (GBR)	24 April 1992 (age 34)
Linda Villumsen (NZL)	9 April 1985 (age 41)

Australian criteriums

A few other riders rode at the end of 2014 in name of the team criteriums in Australia.

Rider	Date of birth
Georgia Baker (Note: Baker joined the team on 5 December.) (AUS)	21 September 1994 (age 32)
Jessica Mundy (Note: Mundy joined the team on 15 October.) (AUS)	25 September 1994 (age 32)
Eileen Roe (GBR)	24 September 1989 (age 37)
Rebecca Wiasak (Note: Wiasak joined the team on 5 November.) (AUS)	25 May 1984 (age 42)

Preceded by 2013	List of UCI Women's Teams; 2014	Succeeded by 2015
