= List of women's road cycling transfers 2014 =

The List of women's road cycling transfers 2014 lists the women cyclist transfers for the 2014 women's cycling season of the 2014 UCI Women's Teams.

The major transfer was announced at a special press conference in October 2013 that the Dutch world time trial champion Ellen van Dijk signed a three years contract for Boels–Dolmans after have ridden 5 years for Specialized–lululemon.

== Team Argos–Shimano ==
In

Rider	From
Floortje Mackaij (NED)	Former junior rider
Sara Mustonen (SWE)	
Maaike Polspoel (BEL)	Sengers Ladies Cycling Team
Julia Soek (NED)	
Kyara Stijns (NED)	Former junior rider
Marijn de Vries (NED)	Lotto–Belisol Ladies

Out

Rider	To
Elke Gebhardt (GER)	Bigla Cycling Team
Kelly Markus (NED)	
Janneke Busser Kanis (NED)	Retiring
Esra Tromp (NED)	Parkhotel Valkenburg p/b Math Salden

== BePink ==
In

Rider	From
Susanna Zorzi (ITA)	Faren Kuota
Anna Maria Stricker (ITA)	MCipollini–Giordana

Out

Rider	To
Noemi Cantele (ITA)	Retiring

== Bigla Cycling Team ==
New UCI Women Team in 2014.

In

Rider	From
Elke Gebhardt (GER)	Team Argos–Shimano
Vera Koedooder (NED)	Sengers Ladies Cycling Team

== Boels–Dolmans Cycling Team ==
In

Rider	From
Ellen van Dijk (NED)	Specialized–lululemon
Janneke Ensing (NED)	Ronald McDonald Huis-Groningen
Megan Guarnier (USA)	Rabobank-Liv Giant
Demi de Jong (NED)	Former junior rider
Christine Majerus (LUX)	Sengers Ladies Cycling Team
Katarzyna Pawłowska (POL)	GSD Gestion-Kallisto
Nicky Zijlaard (NED)	Former junior rider

Out

Rider	To
Kim de Baat (NED)	Parkhotel Valkenburg p/b Math Salden
Martine Bras (NED)	Retiring
Lucy Martin (GBR)	Faren Kuota
Adrie Visser (NED)	Retiring

== Faren Kuota ==
In

Rider	From
Lucy Martin (GBR)	Boels–Dolmans Cycling Team
Rossella Ratto (ITA)	Hitec Products UCK

Out

Rider	To
Christel Ferrier-Bruneau (FRA)	Retiring
Susanna Zorzi (ITA)	BePink

== Futurumshop.nl–Zannata ==
Combined team of CyclelivePlus Zannata and Team Futurumshop.nl

In

Rider	From
Kristen Coppens (NED)	Dura Vermeer
Evy Kuijpers (NED)	
Sofie De Vuyst (BEL)	Sengers Ladies Cycling Team

Out (Team Futurumshop.nl)

Rider	To
Laura van der Kamp (NED)	Peoples Trust Cycling Team
Sarah Roy (AUS)	Team Futurumshop.nl

== GSD Gestion-Kallisto ==
In

Out

Rider	To
Katarzyna Pawłowska (POL)	Boels–Dolmans Cycling Team

== Hitec Products UCK ==
In

Rider	From
Audrey Cordon (FRA)	Vienne Futuroscope
Lauren Kitchen (AUS)	Wiggle–Honda
Ashleigh Moolman (RSA)	Lotto–Belisol Ladies
Sara Olsson (DEN)	

Out

Rider	To
Emilia Fahlin (SWE)	Wiggle–Honda
Rossella Ratto (ITA)	Faren Kuota

== Lointek ==
In

Rider	From
Aude Biannic (FRA)	S.C. Michela Fanini-Rox

== Lotto–Belisol Ladies ==
In

Rider	From
Isabelle Beckers (GER)	Bigla Cycling Team
Amy Cure (AUS)	
Lieselot Decroix (BEL)	CyclelivePlus-Zannata
Chantal Hoffman (LUX)	De Sprinters Malderen
Molly Meyvisch (BEL)	Former junior rider
Emma Pooley (GBR)	Bigla Cycling Team
Sarah Rijkes (AUT)	
Isabelle Söderberg (SWE)	Cramo:Go Green
Anisha Vekemans (BEL)	Topsport Vlaanderen–Bioracer
Sara Verhaest (BEL)	
Liesbet De Vocht (BEL)	Rabobank-Liv Giant

Out

Rider	To
Anne-Sophy Duyck (BEL)	
Michal Ella (ISR)	
Kaat Hannes (BEL)	Topsport Vlaanderen–Pro-Duo
Sharon Laws (GBR)	UnitedHealth Group#UnitedHealthcare
Steffi Lodewyks (BEL)	
Ashleigh Moolman (RSA)	Hitec Products UCK
Kim Schoonbaert (BEL)	Retiring
Carlee Taylor (AUS)	Orica–AIS
Marijn de Vries (NED)	Team Argos–Shimano

== MCipollini–Giordana ==
In

Out

Rider	To
Sara Grifi (ITA)	Retiring
Sylwia Kapusta (POL)	Retiring
Valentina Scandolara (ITA)	Orica–AIS
Anna Maria Stricker (ITA)	BePink

== S.C. Michela Fanini-Rox ==
In

Rider	From
Beatrice Bafile (ITA)	
Michela Balducci (ITA)	Former junior rider
Simona Crotti (ITA)	Former junior rider
Erika Varela (MEX)	

Out

Rider	To
Aude Biannic (FRA)	Lointek
Lisa Gamba (ITA)	Retiring

== Orica–AIS ==
In

Rider	From
Valentina Scandolara (ITA)	MCipollini–Giordana
Grace Sulzberger (AUS)	Jayco–AIS
Carlee Taylor (AUS)	Lotto–Belisol Ladies

Out

Rider	To
Tiffany Cromwell (AUS)	
Sungeun Gu (KOR)	

== Parkhotel Valkenburg p/b Math Salden ==
The team was a non-UCI team in 2013 but gets a UCI licence for 2014. Riders who stayed from the 2013 non-UCI team are (all Dutch): Aafke Eshuis, Sophie de Boer, Bianca van den Hoek, Ilona Hoeksma, Riejanne Markus, Jermaine Post, Rozanne Slik, Lisanne Soemanta.

In

Rider	From
Kim de Baat (NED)	Boels–Dolmans Cycling Team
Natalie van Gogh (NED)	
Marissa Otten (NED)	Cyclelive-Zanatta
Kirsten Peetoom (NED)	
Monique van de Ree (NED)	Cyclelive-Zanatta
Esra Tromp (NED)	Team Argos–Shimano

== Rabobank-Liv Woman Cycling Team ==
In

Rider	From
Anna van der Breggen (NED)	Sengers Ladies Cycling Team
Anna Knauer (GER)	Former junior rider
Katarzyna Niewiadoma (POL)	Was a staigiare in September 2013

Out

Rider	To
Megan Guarnier (USA)	Boels–Dolmans Cycling Team
Liesbet De Vocht (BEL)	Lotto–Belisol Ladies
Jolanda Neff (SUI)	
Sanne van Paassen (NED)	Boels–Dolmans Cycling Team
Rebecca Talen (NED)	

== Team Rytger ==
New UCI Women Team in 2014.

In

Rider	From
Hanna Helamb (SWE)	Cramo Go:Green
Julie Valgren Andersen (DEN)	Former junior rider
Kamilla Sofie Valli (DEN)	
Amalie Winther Olsen (DEN)	

== Sengers Ladies Cycling Team ==
In

Out

Rider	To
Anna van der Breggen (NED)	Rabobank-Liv Giant
Vera Koedooder (NED)	Bigla Cycling Team
Christine Majerus (LUX)	Boels–Dolmans Cycling Team
Maaike Polspoel (BEL)	Team Argos–Shimano
Geerike Schreurs (NED)	Peoples Trust Cycling Team
Sofie De Vuyst (BEL)	Futurumshop.nl

== Velocio–SRAM Pro Cycling ==
In

Rider	From
Karol Ann Canuel (CAN)	Vienne Futuroscope
Chantal Blaak (NED)	Team TIBCO–To The Top
Élise Delzenne (FRA)	Bourgogne Pro Dialog

Out

Rider	To
Katie Colclough (GBR)	Retiring
Ellen van Dijk (NED)	Boels–Dolmans Cycling Team
Ina-Yoko Teutenberg (GER)	Retiring

== Team TIBCO ==
In

Rider	From
Kristabel Doebel-Hickok (USA)	
Lauren Stephens (USA)	FCS
Anika Todd (CAN)	
Scotti Wilborne (USA)	Mellow Mushroom

Out

Rider	To
Chantal Blaak (NED)	Team TIBCO–To The Top
Rushlee Buchanan (NZL)	UnitedHealth Group#UnitedHealthcare
Meredith Miller (USA)	Retiring (staying in CX)

== Top Girls Fassa Bortolo ==
In

Out

Rider	To
Francesca Stefani (ITA)	Retiring

== Topsport Vlaanderen–Pro-Duo ==
In

Rider	From
Kaat Hannes (BEL)	Lotto–Belisol Ladies

Out

Rider	To
Anisha Vekemans (BEL)	Lotto–Belisol Ladies

== UnitedHealth Group#UnitedHealthcare ==
New UCI Women Team in 2014.

In

Rider	From
Mara Abbott (USA)	Exergy TWENTY16
Hannah Barnes (GBR)	MG Maxifuel
Sharon Laws (GBR)	Lotto–Belisol Ladies
Lauren Tamayo (USA)	Exergy TWENTY16
Rushlee Buchanan (NZL)	Team TIBCO
Alison Powers (USA)	NOW & Novartis for MS
Alexis Ryan (USA)	NOW & Novartis for MS
Coryn Rivera (USA)	
Ruth Winder (USA)	Vanderkitten

== Vaiano Fondriest ==
In

Out

Rider	To
Alessandra D'Ettorre (ITA)	Retiring

== Vienne Futuroscope ==
In

Rider	From
Charlotte Bravard (FRA)	Vélophile Naintréenne
Roxane Fournier (FRA)	BigMat–Auber 93
Lucie Pader (FRA)	Bourgogne-ProDialog
Sarah Roy (AUS)	Team Futurumshop.nl
Kimberley Wells (AUS)	Fearless Femmes

Out

Rider	To
Jessica Allen (AUS)	National Cycling Centre Hamilton
Audrey Cordon (FRA)	Hitec Products UCK
Emmanuelle Merlot (FRA)	Retiring
Karol-Ann Canuel (CAN)	Velocio–SRAM Pro Cycling
Jennifer Letué (FRA)	

== Wiggle–Honda ==
In

Rider	From
Emilia Fahlin (SWE)	Hitec Products UCK
Anna Sanchis (ESP)	

Out

Rider	To
Lauren Kitchen (AUS)	Hitec Products UCK

== See also ==
- List of 2014 UCI Women's Teams
- 2014 in women's road cycling
