= 2015 Aromitalia Vaiano season =

2015 Aromitalia Vaiano
- UCI code: VIA
- Main sponsor(s): Aromitalia
- Based: Italy
- Bicycles: Fondriest

The 2015 women's road cycling season was the sixth for the Aromitalia Vaiano cycling team, which began as the Vaiano Solaristech in 2010.

== Roster ==
Rider	Date of birth
Marta Bastianelli (ITA)	30 April 1987 (age 39)
Martina Biola (ITA)	12 January 1996 (age 30)
Sérika Gulumá (COL)	16 July 1990 (age 36)
Lija Laizāne (LAT)	6 June 1993 (age 33)
Rasa Leleivytė (LTU)	22 July 1988 (age 38)
Allison Linnell (USA)	2 May 1992 (age 34)

Rider	Date of birth
Alessia Martini (ITA)	10 January 1992 (age 34)
Jessica Parra (COL)	10 August 1995 (age 31)
Miriam Romei (ITA)	22 November 1995 (age 30)
Kataržina Sosna (LTU)	30 November 1990 (age 35)
Ewelina Szybiak (POL)	13 September 1989 (age 37)

Riders who joined the team for the 2015 season
Rider	2014 team
Marta Bastianelli (ITA)	Estado de México–Faren Kuota
Martina Biola (ITA)	
Allison Linnell (USA)	

Riders who left the team during or after the 2015 season
Rider	2015 team
Carlotta Brui (ITA)	
Sylwia Kapusta-Szydlak (POL)	Retired
Rasa Pocyte (LTU)	
Chiara Vannucci (ITA)	

== Season victories ==
Date	Race	Cat.	Rider	Country	Location

== UCI World Ranking ==
The 2015 UCI Women's Road Rankings are rankings based upon the results in all UCI-sanctioned races of the 2015 women's road cycling season.

Aromitalia Vaiano finished 24th in the 2015 ranking for UCI teams.

Individual world ranking
Rank	Rider	Points
76	(Italy) Marta Bastianelli	104
135	(Lithuania) Rasa Leleivytė	48
189	(Colombia) Sérika Gulumá Ortiz	26
231	(Latvia) Lija Laizāne	18
587	(Poland) Ewelina Szybiak	2
