= MEXX–Watersley International Women's Cycling Team =

Team information
- UCI code: MVC (2016–2018); WAT (2019)
- Registered: Netherlands
- Founded: 2016
- Disbanded: 2019; Merged with Andy Schleck Cycles–Immo Losch
- Discipline: Road
- Status: National (2016–2018); UCI Women's Team (2019)
- Website: Team home page

Key personnel
- Team managers: Tjarco Cuppens; Glenn Crauwels

Team name history
- 2016 2017 2018 2018 2019: Maaslandster Nicheliving CCN Cycling Team; Maaslandster Veris CCN International Cycling Team; Maaslandster International Women's Cycling Team; Watersley International Women's Cycling Team; MEXX–Watersley International Women's Cycling Team

MEXX–Watersley International Women's Cycling Team is a cycling team based in the Netherlands, founded in 2016, which attained UCI status for the 2019 season. The team announced on their facebook page the intention to fold the team at the end of the 2019 season, however their support staff and a few riders would be moving to Andy Schleck Cycles - Immo Losch.

== Team roster ==
As at 28 October 2019

Rider	Date of birth
Mandana Dehghan (IRN)	26 February 1991 (aged 28)
Minke Van Dongen (NED)	19 January 1983 (aged 36)
Désirée Ehrler (SUI)	20 August 1991 (aged 28)
Femke Geeris (NED)	3 June 1996 (aged 23)
Lisa Groothuesheidkamp (CUR)	15 July 1996 (aged 23)
Sarah Inghelbrecht (BEL)	1 October 1992 (aged 27)
Amanda Jamieson (NZL)	8 May 1997 (aged 22)
Nicola Juniper (GBR)	12 August 1981 (aged 38)
Mae Lang (EST)	4 February 1996 (aged 23)
Corinna Lechner (GER)	10 August 1994 (aged 25)

Rider	Date of birth
Jer Ling Lee (SIN)	13 May 1988 (aged 31)
Bronwyn Macgregor (NZL)	12 November 1982 (aged 36)
Rylee McMullen (NZL)	19 July 1995 (aged 24)
Argiro Milaki (GRE)	3 July 1992 (aged 27)
Lauren Murphy (GBR)	26 March 1999 (aged 20)
Yasue Nakahara (JPN)	5 August 1986 (aged 33)
Alisa van Oijen (AUT)	1 October 1992 (aged 27)
Arianna Pruisscher (NED)	7 October 1998 (aged 21)
Quinty Schoens (NED)	2 December 1999 (aged 19)
Kate Smith (NZL)	3 April 1999 (aged 20)

== Major Wins ==
2016
Internationales Rück XXXL, Erin Kinnealy
Sparkassen Giro, Kirsten Peetoom
Klimoploop van Ulestraten, Kirsten Peetoom
Rund um Merken, Kylie Waterreus

2017
Innerschweizermeisterschaften, Désirée Ehrler
Rund um Merken, Désirée Ehrler
Aargauer Challenge Rüfenach, Désirée Ehrler
Zandhoven (Pulderbos), Femke Geeris
Ronde van Goor, Kirsten Peetoom
Mettmanner Sparkassen-Cup, Tamara Preuss
District Championship Limburg (Time Trial), Christel Van Loo
Rund um Düren, Kylie Waterreus

2018
Gerwen Criterium, Roos Hoogeboom
Rotterdam, Roos Hoogeboom
Gilze-Rijen, Roos Hoogeboom
Mill, Roos Hoogeboom

2019
Youth classification Festival Elsy Jacobs, Franziska Koch

== National Champions ==
2017
New Zealand U23 Road Race, Amanda Jamieson
Austrian Track (500m time trial), Verena Eberhardt
Austrian Track (Individual sprint), Verena Eberhardt
Austrian Track (Points race), Verena Eberhardt
Austrian Track (Omnium), Verena Eberhardt
Austrian Track (Scratch race), Verena Eberhardt

2018
Singapore Road Race, Jer Ling Serene Lee
Austrian Track (Omnium), Verena Eberhardt
Austrian Track (Points race), Verena Eberhardt
Austrian Track (Scratch race), Verena Eberhardt

2019
Greek Road Race, Argiro Milaki
Greek Track (Keirin), Argiro Milaki
Greek Track (Scratch race), Argiro Milaki
