= Nina Berton =

Luxembourgish cyclist (born 2001)

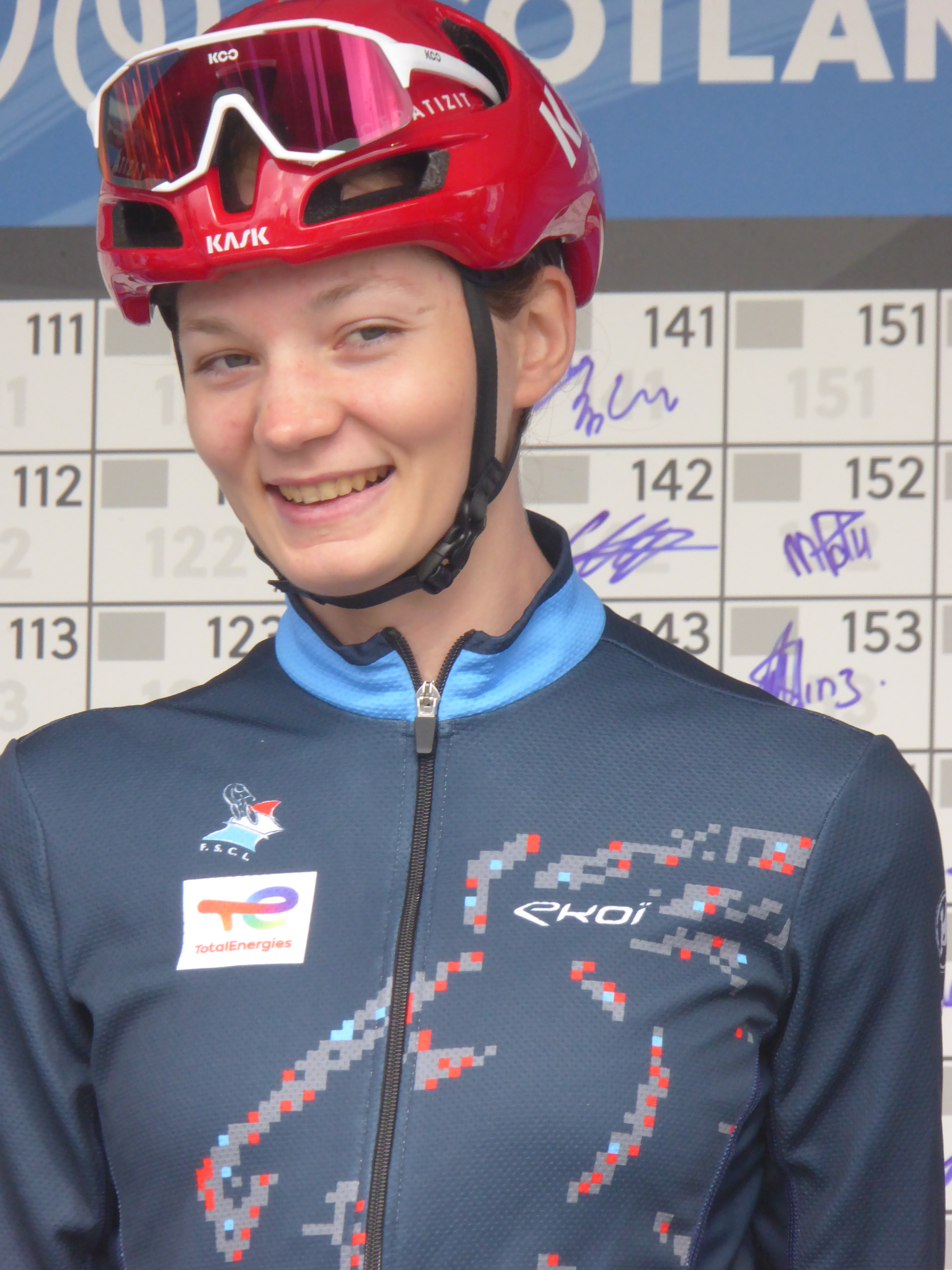
- Berton at the 2023 UCI Road World Championships

Personal information
- Born: 3 August 2001 (age 25)

Cycling career
- Sport: Cycling
- Current team: EF Education–Oatly
- Discipline: Road
- Role: Rider

Amateur teams
- 2018: UC Dippach
- 2018–2020: Andy Schleck Cycles

Professional teams
- 2021–2022: Andy Schleck–CP NVST–Immo Losch
- 2023–2024: Ceratizit–WNT Pro Cycling
- 2025–: EF Education–Oatly
Medal record
Women's road cycling
Representing Luxembourg
Games of the Small States of Europe
Gold medal – first place	2025 Andorra la Vella	Road race
Gold medal – first place	2025 Andorra la Vella	Team road race
Silver medal – second place	2025 Andorra la Vella	Time trial

Nina Berton (born 3 August 2001) is a Luxembourgish professional racing cyclist, who currently rides for EF Education–Oatly. Until 2025 she rode for Ceratizit Pro Cycling. In 2021 and 2022 she rode for Andy Schleck–CP NVST–Immo Losch. She rode in the women's road race event at the 2020 UCI Road World Championships.

== Major results ==
2018
National Junior Road Championships

1st Road race
1st Time trial

2019
National Junior Road Championships

1st Road race
1st Time trial

2020
National Under-23 Road Championships

2nd Road race
2nd Time trial

2021
National Under-23 Road Championships

1st Road race
1st Time trial

2022
National Under-23 Road Championships

1st Road race
1st Time trial

2023
1st Mountains classification, Tour de Normandie Féminin
1st Mountains classification, Grand Prix Elsy Jacobs
National Under-23 Road Championships

1st Time trial
2nd Road race

2nd Road race, National Road Championships
2024
National Road Championships

2nd Time trial
3rd Road race

9th Festival Elsy Jacobs Garnich
2026
1st Pointe du Raz Ladies Classic
9th Omloop Het Nieuwsblad
