= Amanda Jamieson =

New Zealand cyclist

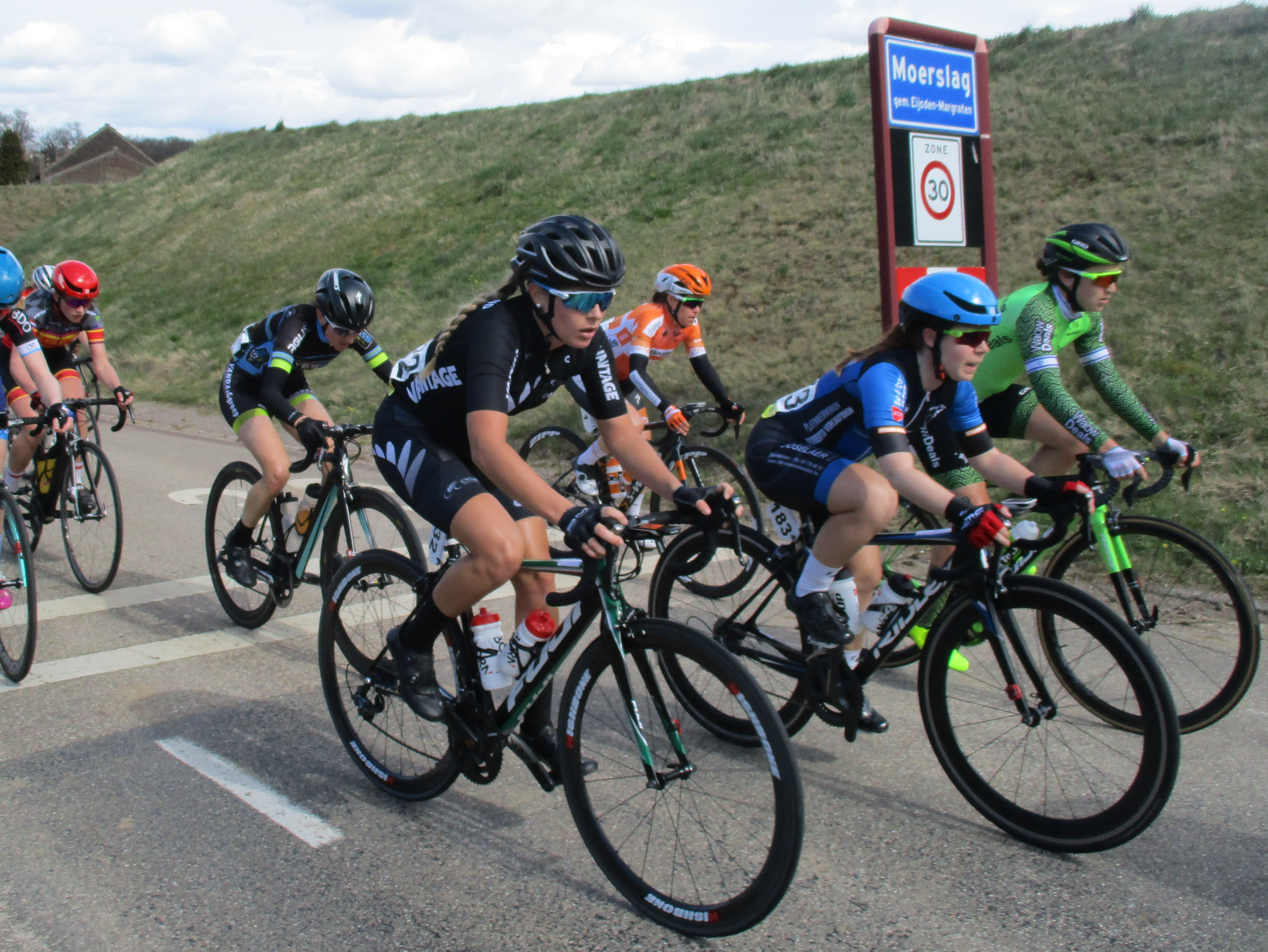
- Jamieson in 2018

Personal information
- Full name: Amanda Jamieson
- Born: 8 May 1997 (age 29)

Cycling career
- Sport: Cycling
- Current team: MEXX–Watersley
- Discipline: Road
- Role: Rider

Amateur team
- 2017–2018: Team Maaslandster Veris CCN

Professional team
- 2019–: MEXX–Watersley

Amanda Jamieson (born 8 May 1997) is a New Zealand professional racing cyclist who rides for Team Maaslandster Veris CCN.
It was announced in November 2017 that Jamieson would continue to ride for the team in 2018.

== Major results ==
2014
Oceania Junior Road Championships

3rd Time Trial
5th Road race

2016
8th National Road Race Championships
1st Women's Tour of New Zealand

1st Mountains classification
1st Stages 1, 2, 3 & 4

2017
National Under–23 Road Championships

1st Road Race
5th Time Trial

6th Road Race, National Road Championships
2018
2nd Rund in Fischeln
8th Bev May Women's Tour

1st Stage 1

10th SwissEver GP Cham-Hagendorn
2019
8th Road Race, National Road Championships
5th Time Trial, National Under–23 Road Championships
