= Serene Lee =

Singaporean cyclist

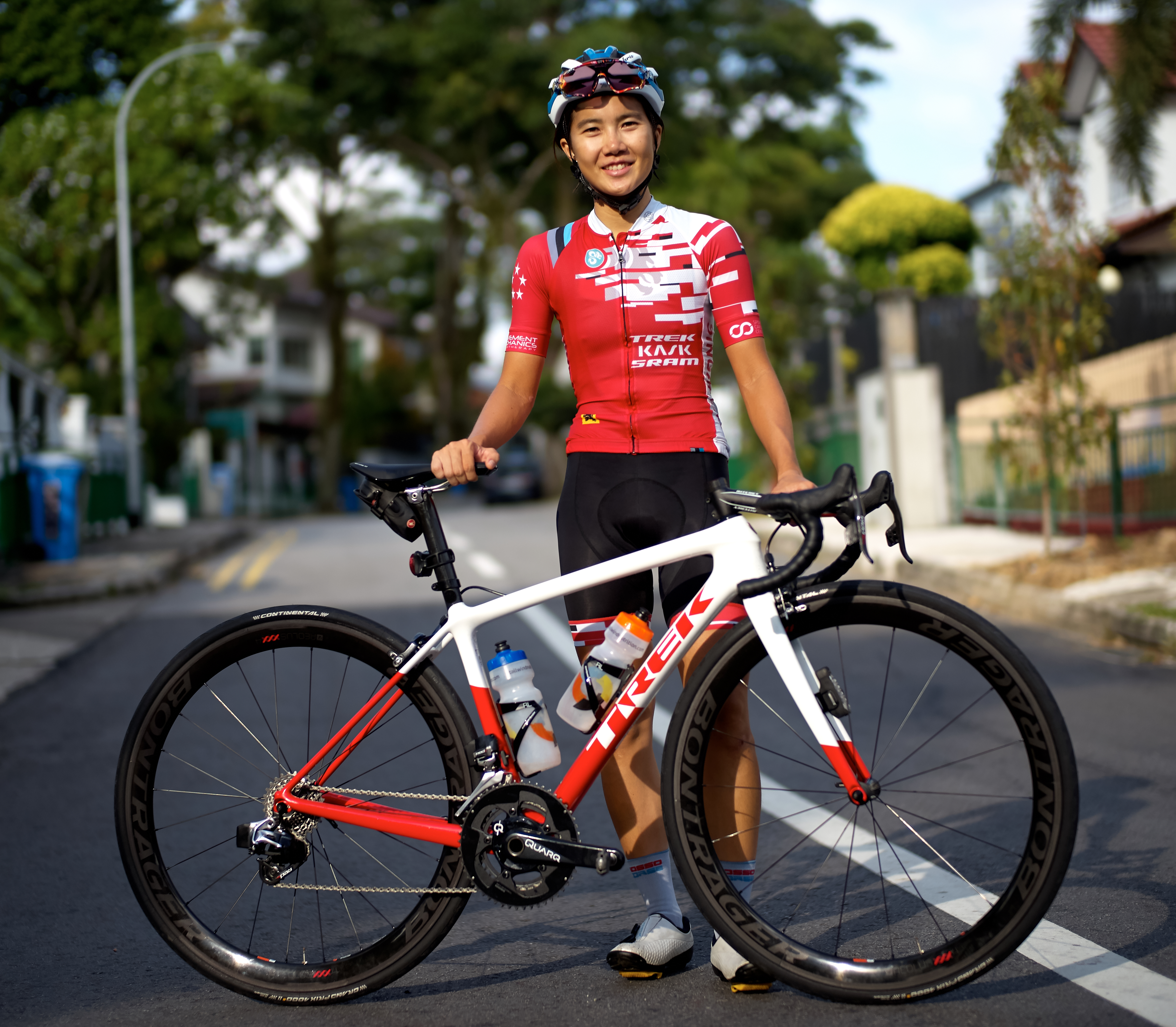

Personal information
- Full name: Jer Ling Serene Lee
- Born: 13 May 1988 (age 38) Singapore

Cycling career
- Sport: Cycling
- Current team: Cycling Development Foundation
- Discipline: Road cycling
- Role: Rider

Amateur teams
- 2014: Holden Women's Cycling Team
- 2016: Building Champions
- 2018: Maaslandster International Women's Cycling Team
- 2019: MEXX–Watersley International Women's Cycling Team
- 2022-: Cycling Development Foundation

Major wins
- Singapore National Road Champion 2018

Serene Lee is a road cyclist from Singapore. Before taking up cycling, she played basketball for eight years, captaining the Singaporean national women's youth basketball team and playing for the Singapore women's national basketball team at the 2007 Southeast Asian Games and the 2007 FIBA Asia Championship for Women. She originally took up cycling due to its low impact nature after sustaining a number of sporting injuries.

She represented her nation in the women's road race event at the 2010 UCI Road World Championships. Lee also competed for Singapore at the 2011 and 2015 Southeast Asian Games. After several narrow misses, in 2018 she became Singaporean national road race champion for the first time.
