= Roos Hoogeboom =

Dutch cyclist

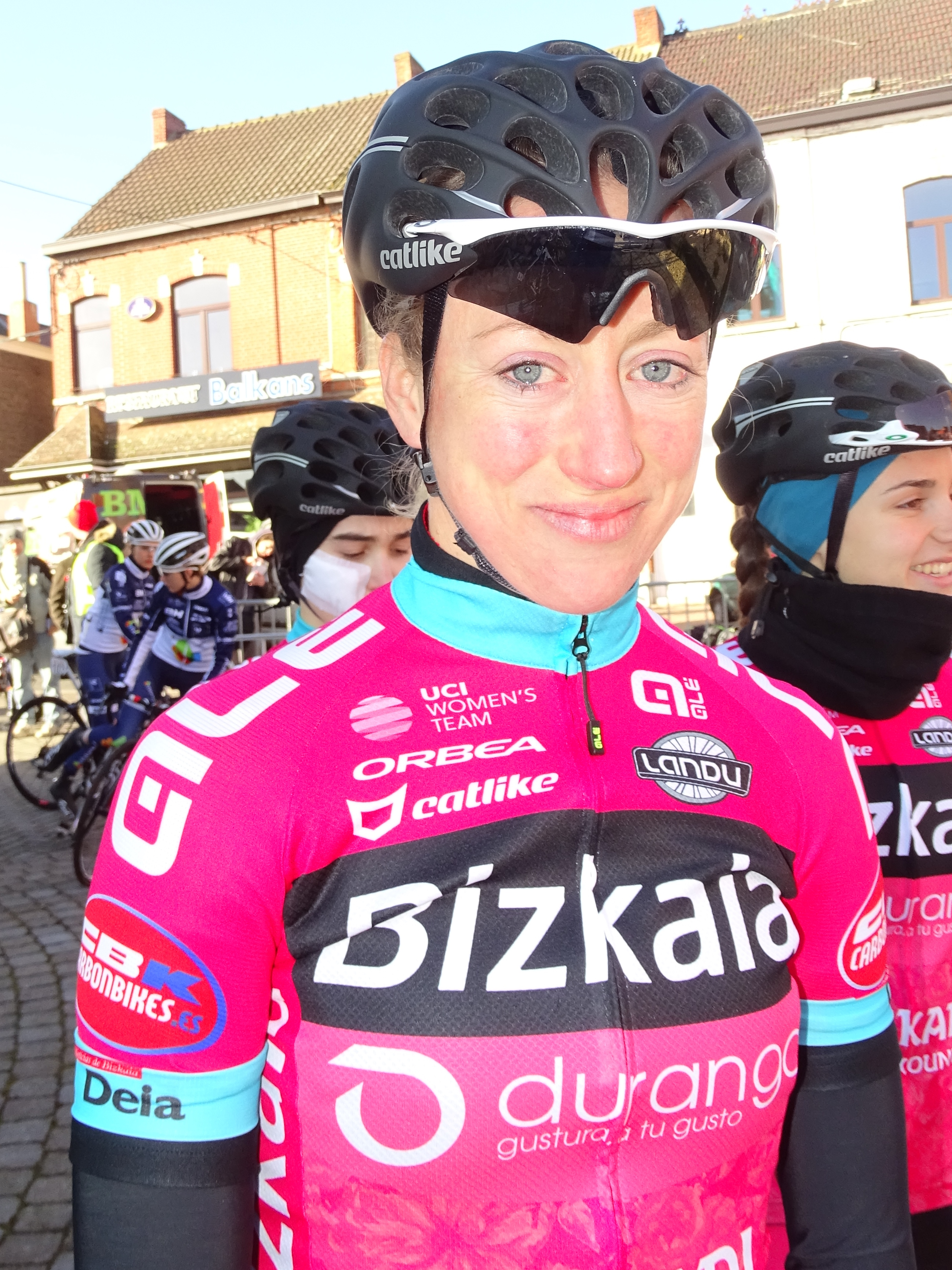
- Hoogeboom at the 2016 Le Samyn des Dames

Personal information
- Full name: Roos Hoogeboom
- Born: 16 August 1982 (age 44) Medemblik, Netherlands

Cycling career
- Sport: Cycling
- Current team: Retired
- Discipline: Road
- Role: Rider

Amateur teams
- 2013–2015: Jan van Arckel
- 2018: Maaslandster International Women's Cycling Team

Professional teams
- 2016–2017: Bizkaia–Durango
- 2019–2020: Biehler Pro Cycling

Roos Hoogeboom (born 16 August 1982) is a Dutch former professional racing cyclist, who rode professionally between 2016 and 2020 – except for 2018 – for the Bizkaia–Durango and Biehler Krush Pro Cycling teams.

== Major results ==
2014
9th Overall Tour de Feminin

== See also ==
- List of 2016 UCI Women's Teams and riders
