= Claire Faber =

Luxembourgish cyclist (born 1998)

Personal information
- Full name: Claire Faber
- Born: 21 June 1998 (age 28)

Cycling career
- Sport: Cycling
- Discipline: Road
- Role: Retired

Amateur teams
- 2017: Jos Feron Lady Force
- 2018–2019: Andy Schleck Cycles
- 2020: Illi-Bikes

Professional team
- 2021–2022: Andy Schleck–CP NVST–Immo Losch

Claire Faber (born 21 June 1998) is a Luxembourgish racing cyclist, who last rode for UCI Women's Continental Team Andy Schleck–CP NVST–Immo Losch in 2021 and 2022. She rode in the women's road race event at the 2017 UCI Road World Championships.

For the 2021 season, Faber was initially due to be part of Team Rupelcleaning for their first season at UCI level, having been part of the team in 2020 when they were competing domestically as Illi-Bikes. She ultimately signed for Andy Schleck–CP NVST–Immo Losch.
