= Mae Lang =

Estonian cyclist

Personal information
- Born: 4 February 1996 (age 30)

Cycling career
- Sport: Cycling
- Current team: Andy Schleck–CP NVST–Immo Losch
- Discipline: Road
- Role: Rider

Amateur teams
- 2019: MEXX–Watersley
- 2020: Andy Schleck Cycles–Immo Losch

Professional team
- 2021–: Andy Schleck–CP NVST–Immo Losch

Mae Lang (born 4 February 1996) is an Estonian professional racing cyclist, who currently rides for UCI Women's Continental Team Andy Schleck–CP NVST–Immo Losch. She rode in the women's road race at the 2019 UCI Road World Championships in Yorkshire, England.
