= Martina Biolo =

Italian cyclist (born 1996)

Personal information
- Born: 12 January 1996 (age 30)

Cycling career
- Sport: Cycling
- Role: Rider

Martina Biolo (born 12 January 1996) is an Italian professional racing cyclist. She rides for the Aromitalia Vaiano team.

== See also ==
- List of 2015 UCI Women's Teams and riders
