= Andy Schleck–CP NVST–Immo Losch =

Luxembourg cycling team

Team information
- UCI code: ASC (2019–)
- Registered: Luxembourg
- Founded: 2018
- Discipline: Road
- Status: National (2019–2020); UCI Women's Continental Team (2021–)

Key personnel
- Team manager: Tjarco Cuppens

Team name history
- 2018 2019–2020 2021–: Andy Schleck Cycles; Andy Schleck Cycles–Immo Losch; Andy Schleck–CP NVST–Immo Losch

Andy Schleck–CP NVST–Immo Losch is a Luxembourg-based road cycling team, that was formed in 2018 for riders under the age of 18. The following year, the team moved up to a national level, before registering with the Union Cycliste Internationale (UCI) as a Women's Continental Team for the 2021 season.

== Team roster ==
As of 17 January 2021.

Rider	Date of birth
Michelle Andres (SUI)	26 May 1997 (age 29)
Maïté Barthels (LUX)	23 November 2001 (age 24)
Mia Berg (LUX)	4 August 1997 (age 29)
Nina Berton (LUX)	3 August 2001 (age 25)
Fabienne Buri (SUI)	17 March 1999 (age 27)
Georgia Danford (NZL)	3 April 1999 (age 27)
Désirée Ehrler (SUI)	20 August 1991 (age 35)
Claire Faber (LUX)	21 June 1998 (age 28)
Line Marie Gulliksen (NOR)	4 July 1990 (age 36)
Mae Lang (EST)	4 February 1996 (age 30)

Rider	Date of birth
Annika Luthje (LUX)	7 July 1989 (age 37)
Rylee McMullen (NZL)	19 July 1995 (age 31)
Léna Mettraux (SUI)	8 September 1998 (age 27)
Lisa Müllenberg (NED)	21 August 1996 (age 30)
Lauren Murphy (GBR)	26 March 1999 (age 27)
Mie Bjørndal Ottestad (NOR)	17 July 1997 (age 29)
Carolin Schiff (GER)	3 January 1986 (age 40)
Zsófia Szabó (HUN)	3 January 1997 (age 29)
Sandra Weiss (SUI)	27 February 1991 (age 35)

== Major results ==
2021
Asker Cyclo-cross, Mie Ottestad

== National champions ==
2021
New Zealand Track (Team pursuit), Rylee McMullen
Switzerland Track (Elimination race), Fabienne Buri
Norwegian Cyclo-cross, Mie Ottestad

2022
Switzerland Track (Elimination race), Fabienne Buri
Switzerland Track (Omnium), Léna Mettraux
Switzerland Track (Points race), Léna Mettraux
South Africa Track (Elimination race), Kerry Jonker
Luxembourg U23 Time Trial, Nina Berton
Luxembourg U23 Road Race, Nina Berton
