= Désirée Ehrler =

Swiss cyclist

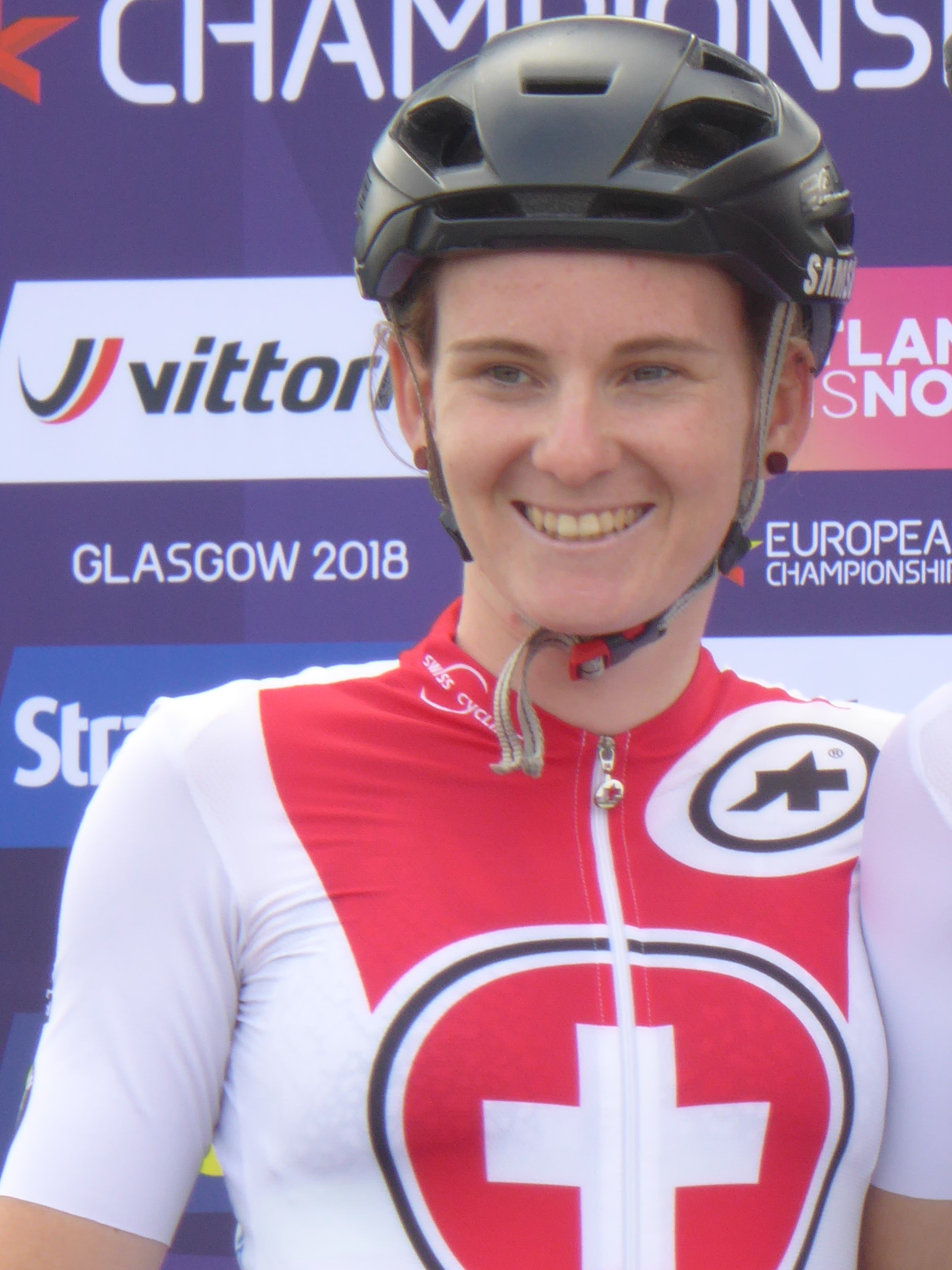
- Ehrler at the 2018 European Road Cycling Championships.

Personal information
- Full name: Désirée Ehrler
- Born: 20 August 1991 (age 35) Switzerland

Cycling career
- Sport: Cycling
- Discipline: Road
- Role: Rider

Amateur team
- 2017–2019: Maaslandster

Professional teams
- 2013–2014: Bigla Cycling Team
- 2015: Feminine Cycling Team
- 2020: Multum Accountants–LSK Ladies
- 2021: Andy Schleck–CP NVST–Immo Losch

Désirée Ehrler (born 20 August 1991) is a Swiss racing cyclist, who most recently rode for UCI Women's Continental Team Andy Schleck–CP NVST–Immo Losch. She rode at the 2014 UCI Road World Championships.

== Major results ==
2010
2nd Halle-Buizingen
2012
National Road Championships

4th Road race
4th Time trial

2014
3rd Erondegemse Pijl
2015
8th SwissEver GP Cham-Hagendorn
10th Erondegemse Pijl
2017
10th SwissEver GP Cham-Hagendorn
2018
3rd SwissEver GP Cham-Hagendorn
10th Omloop van de IJsseldelta
2020
8th Gravel and Tar la Femme
