= Alisa van Oijen =

Austrian cyclist (born 1992)

Personal information
- Full name: Alisa van Oijen
- Born: 1 October 1992 (age 34) Apeldoorn, Gelderland, Netherlands
- Height: 173 cm (5 ft 8 in)
- Weight: 63 kg (139 lb)

Cycling career
- Sport: Cycling
- Current team: MEXX–Watersley
- Discipline: Road
- Role: Rider

Amateur teams
- 2008-2010: ARBÖ Radsportteam Ried
- 2011-2013: ARBÖ Löffler Ladies Team
- 2016: Radclub Tirol
- 2017: Maxx-Solar Cycling Team

Professional teams
- 2014-2015: NÖ Radunion Vitalogic
- 2019–: MEXX–Watersley

Alisa van Oijen (born 1 October 1992) is an Austrian former professional racing cyclist. She was born in the Netherlands and moved to Austria at the age of six. From 2014 to 2015, van Oijen was riding for the women's UCI team NÖ Radunion Vitalogic. In 2017, she rides for the German amateur team Maxx-Solar Cycling Team. Her best career result so far has been a 7th place in the road race of the 2014 Austrian championships as well as several medals in U23 competitions.
