= Ewelina Szybiak =

Polish cyclist

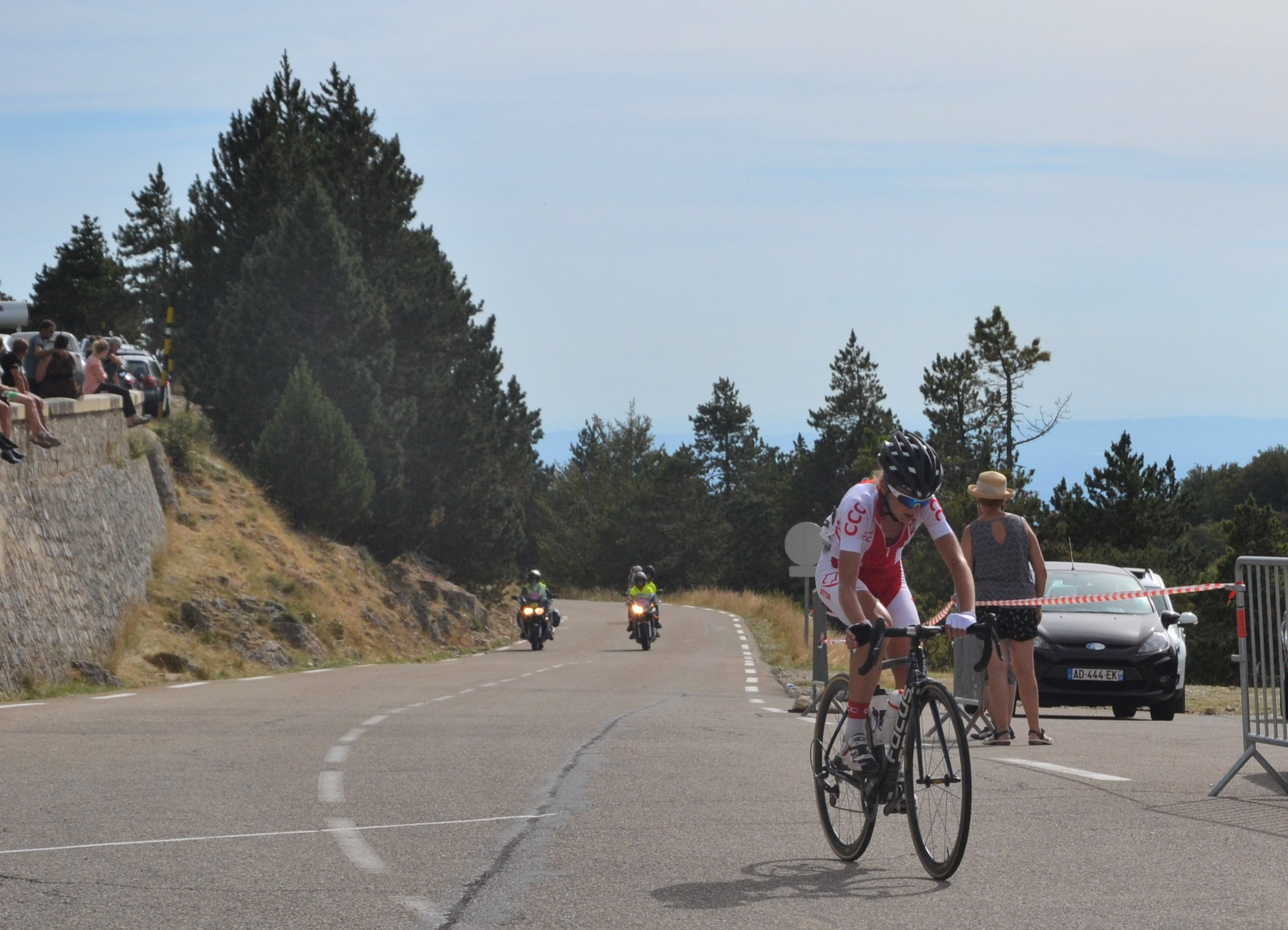
- Ewelina Szybiak in 2016

Personal information
- Born: 13 September 1989 (age 37) Poland

Cycling career
- Sport: Cycling
- Role: Rider

Professional team
- 2014-2015: Vaiano Fondriest

Ewelina Szybiak (born 13 September 1989) is a Polish racing cyclist. She rode at the 2014 UCI Road World Championships.
