= Alessia Martini =

Italian cyclist

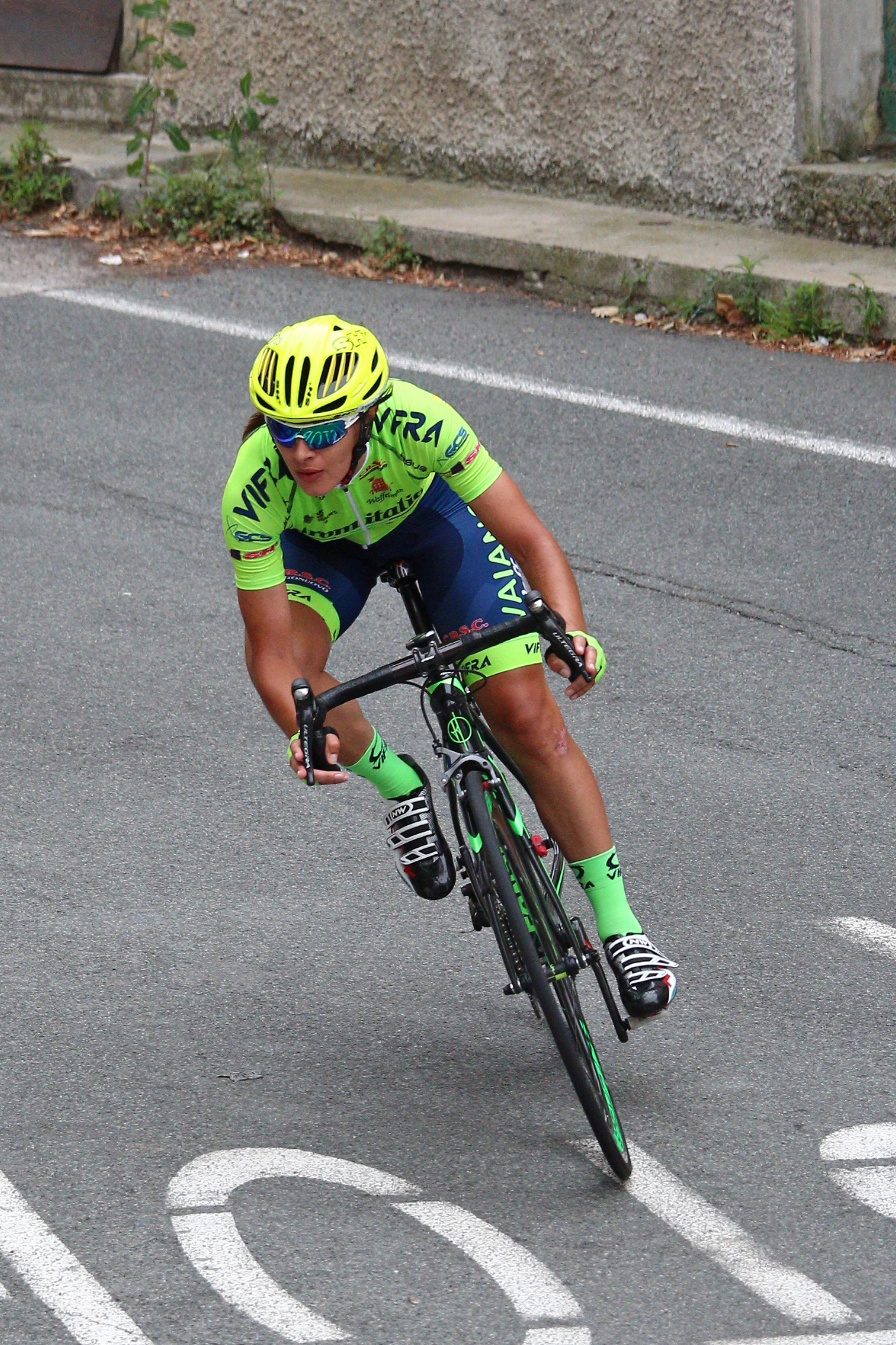
- Alessia Martini during the Giro Rosa 2016

Personal information
- Born: 10 January 1992 (age 34)

Cycling career
- Sport: Cycling
- Role: Rider

Alessia Martini (born 10 January 1992) is an Italian professional racing cyclist. She rides for the Aromitalia Vaiano team.

== See also ==
- List of 2015 UCI Women's Teams and riders
