= Molly Meyvisch =

Belgian cyclist

Personal information
- Born: 27 October 1995 (age 30)

Cycling career
- Sport: Cycling
- Role: Rider

Molly Meyvisch (born 27 October 1995) is a Belgian professional racing cyclist. She rides for the Lotto-Soudal Ladies team.

== See also ==
- List of 2015 UCI Women's Teams and riders
