= Anisha Vekemans =

Belgian cyclist

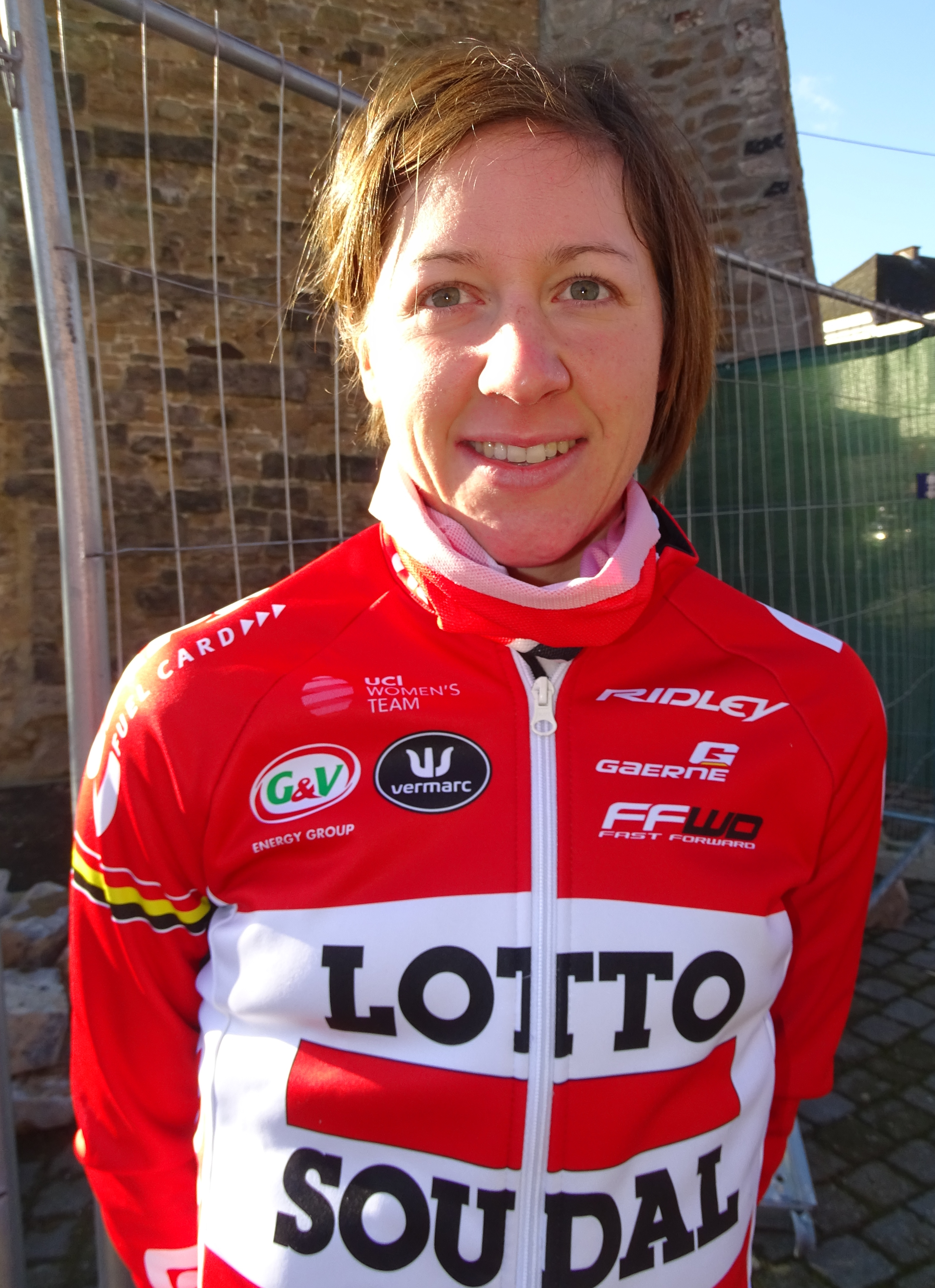
- Vekemans in 2016

Personal information
- Full name: Anisha Vekemans
- Born: 17 August 1991 (age 35) Lommel, Belgium

Cycling career
- Sport: Cycling
- Current team: Retired
- Discipline: Road
- Role: Rider

Professional teams
- 2010–2013: Topsport Vlaanderen–Thompson Ladies Team
- 2014–2016: Lotto–Belisol Ladies
- 2017–2018: Alé–Cipollini
- 2019: Doltcini–Van Eyck Sport

Anisha Vekemans (born 17 August 1991) is a Belgian former professional racing cyclist, who rode professionally between 2010 and 2019 for the Topsport Vlaanderen–Bioracer, Lotto–Soudal Ladies, Alé–Cipollini and Doltcini–Van Eyck Sport teams. She competed in the women's road race at the 2015 UCI Road World Championships.

== Major results ==
2010
10th Chrono des Nations
2012
10th Overall Trophée d'Or Féminin
2015
3rd Time trial, Antwerp Provincial Road Championships
9th Overall Trophée d'Or Féminin

1st Stage 4

2016
7th Overall Gracia–Orlová

== See also ==
- List of 2015 UCI Women's Teams and riders
