= Anika Todd =

Canadian cyclist

Personal information
- Born: 11 March 1990 (age 36)

Cycling career
- Sport: Cycling
- Role: Rider

Anika Todd (born 11 March 1990) is a Canadian racing cyclist. She rode at the 2014 UCI Road World Championships.
