= Kirsten Peetoom =

Dutch cyclist (born 1988)

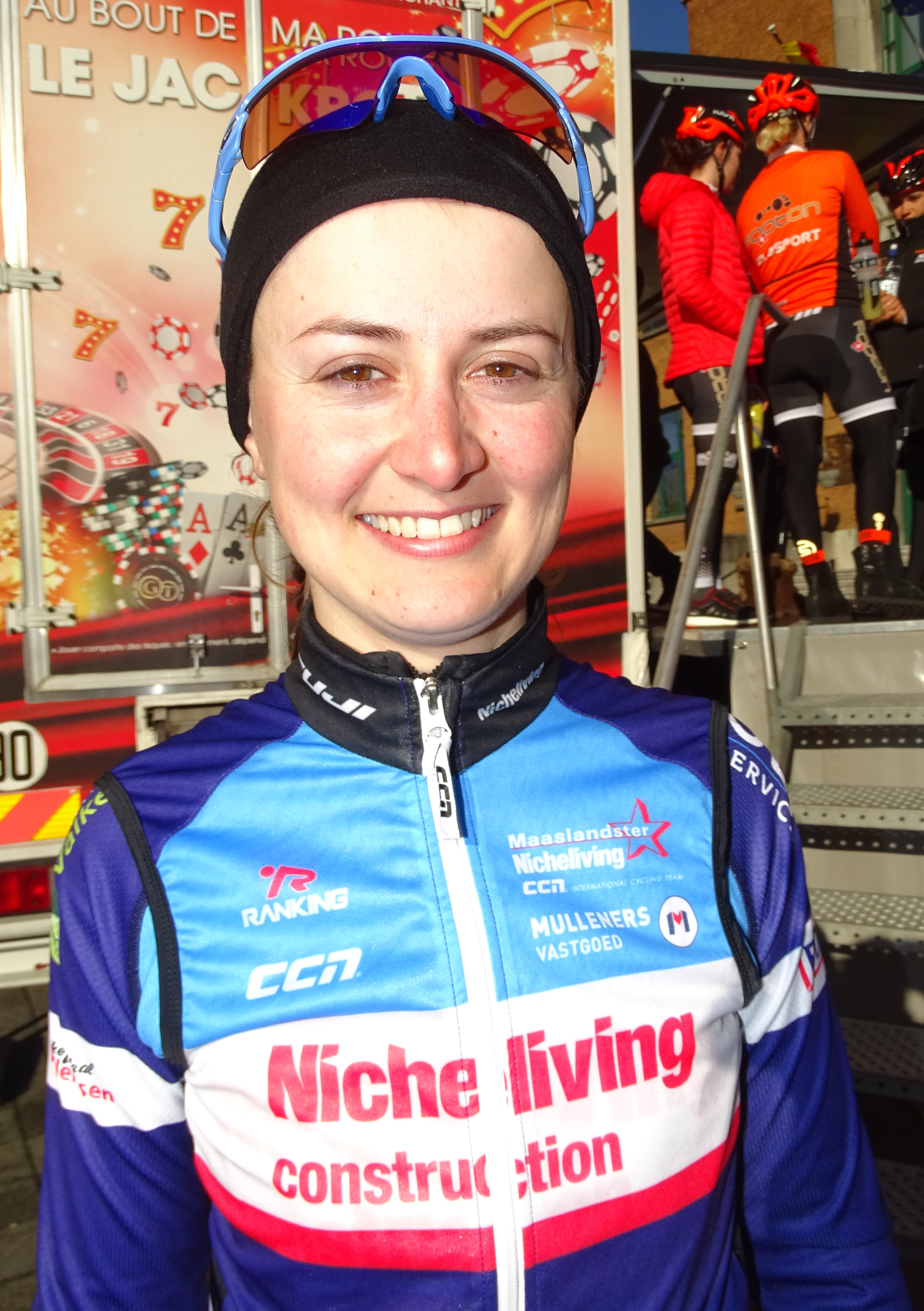
- Kirsten Peetoom in 2016

Personal information
- Born: 1 October 1988 (age 38) Badhoevedorp, Netherlands

Cycling career
- Sport: Cycling
- Discipline: Road
- Role: Rider

Amateur teams
- 2008–2009: Restore Cycling Ladies
- 2010–2011: Moving Ladies
- 2012: NWV Groningen
- 2013: GRC Jan Van Arckel
- 2015: WV Breda
- 2016–2017: Maaslandster
- 2018: Jos Feron Lady Force
- 2019–2020: Restore Cycling Ladies

Professional team
- 2014: Parkhotel Valkenburg Continental Team

Kirsten Peetoom (born 1 October 1988) is a Dutch racing cyclist. She finished fourth at the 2013 Erondegemse Pijl, tenth at the Parel van de Veluwe in 2015, and eighth at the Omloop van de IJsseldelta in 2018.

== Personal life ==
Outside of cycling, Peetoom has been a PhD student in health sciences at Maastricht University since 2014, having previously undertaken studies at the University of Amsterdam, the Vrije Universiteit Amsterdam and Zuyd University of Applied Sciences.

== See also ==
- 2014 Parkhotel Valkenburg Continental Team season
