= Isabelle Beckers =

Belgian cyclist (born 1983)

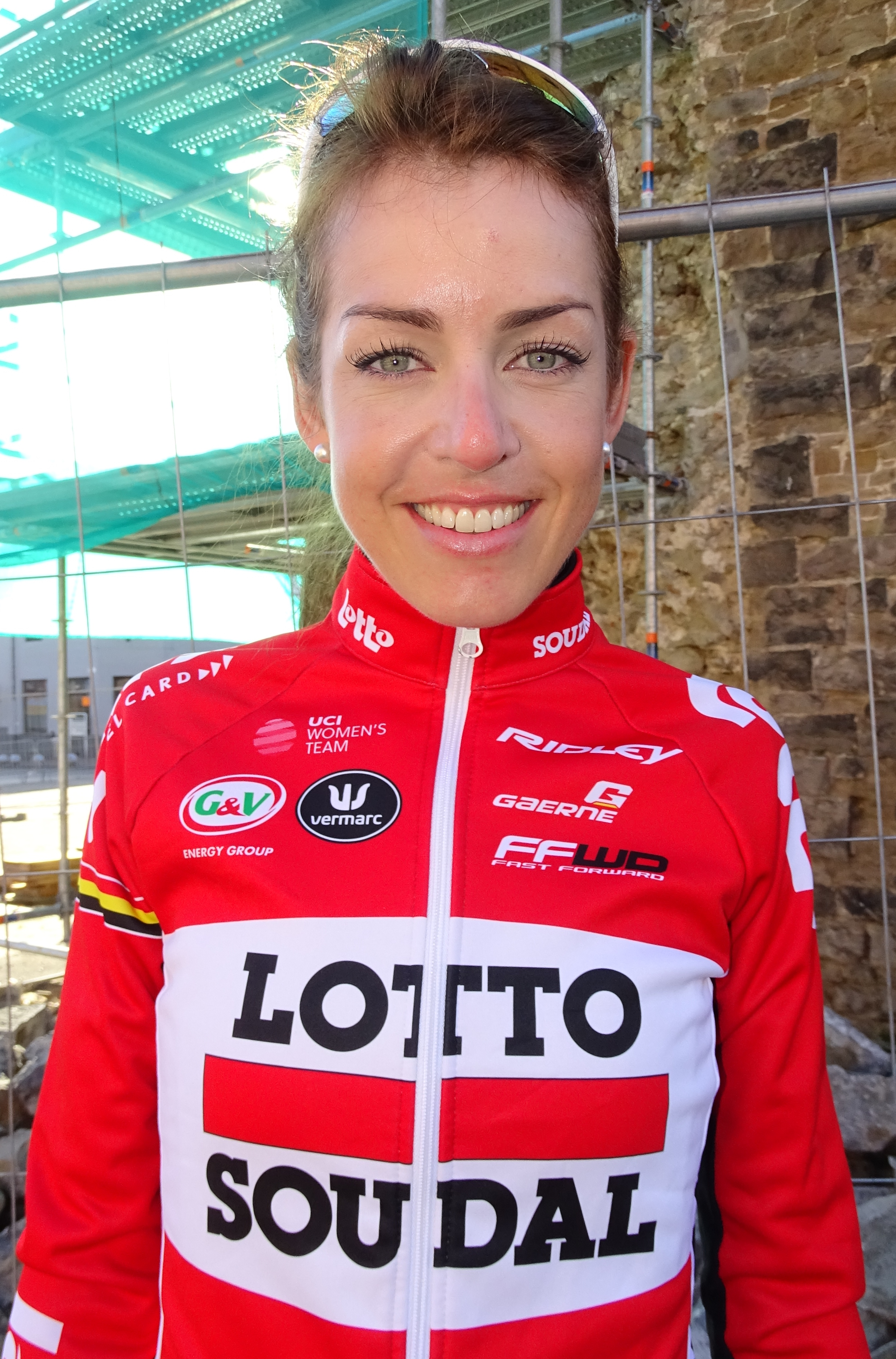
- Beckers in 2016

Personal information
- Full name: Isabelle Beckers
- Born: 4 March 1983 (age 43)

Cycling career
- Sport: Cycling
- Disciplines: Road; Track
- Role: Rider

Amateur team
- 2019–2020: Illi-Bikes Cycling Team

Professional teams
- 2013: Bigla Cycling Team
- 2014–2018: Lotto–Belisol Ladies
- 2021: Team Rupelcleaning–Champion Lubricants

Isabelle Beckers (born 4 March 1983) is a Belgian professional racing cyclist, who rode for UCI Women's Continental Team Team Rupelcleaning–Champion Lubricants in 2021. She finished third in the Belgian National Time Trial Championships in 2016, and second in 2017.

== Major results ==
=== Road ===
2016
3rd Time trial, National Championships
2017
2nd Time trial, National Championships

== See also ==
- List of 2015 UCI Women's Teams and riders
