= Lotto–Intermarché Ladies =

Belgian cycling team

Team information
- UCI code: LBL (2006–2009, 2012–2014); LHT (2010); LLT (2011); LSL (2015–2022); LDL (2023–2024); LOL (2025); LIL (2026–)
- Registered: Belgium
- Founded: 2006
- Discipline: Road
- Status: UCI Women's Team (2006–2019); UCI Women's Continental Team (2020–2025); UCI Women's ProTeam (2026–present)

Key personnel
- General manager: Kurt Van De Wouwer
- Team managers: Wesley Van Speybroeck; Grace Verbeke; Zico Waeytens

Team name history
- 2006–2009 2010 2011 2012–2014 2015–2022 2023–2024 2025 2026–: Lotto–Belisol Ladiesteam; Lotto–Honda Team; Lotto Ladies Team; Lotto–Belisol Ladies; Lotto–Soudal Ladies; Lotto Dstny Ladies; Lotto Ladies; Lotto–Intermarché Ladies
Lotto–Intermarché Ladies jersey
Jersey

Lotto–Intermarché Ladies is a women's professional cycling team based in Belgium, which competes in elite road bicycle racing and track cycling events, such as the UCI Women's World Tour. The team was established in 2006, and its colours are white, black, and red. The team manager and representative is Kurt Van De Wouwer, and the assistant team manager is Annelies Dom.

The team is sponsored by the Belgian state lottery and French supermarket Intermarché. It is the sister team of the men's UCI WorldTeam Lotto–Intermarché.

== History ==
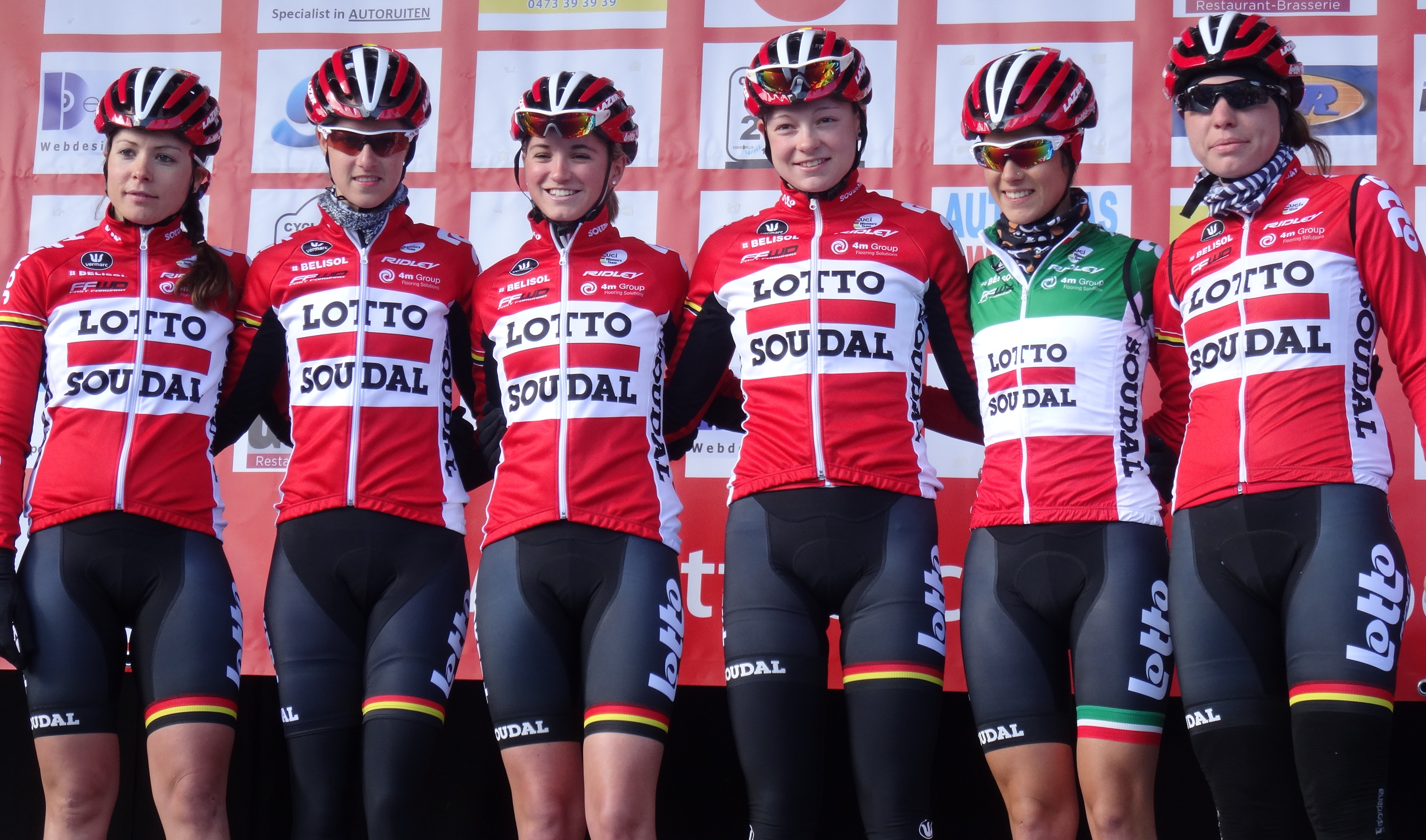
The team at the 2015 Le Samyn des Dames

=== 2014 ===
==== Riders in ====
In August the team announced the signing of Joëlle Numainville (Optum–Kelly Benefit Strategies) with immediate effect. Susanna Zorzi and Jessie Daams joined the team for 2015. On 29 October the team signed Anouk Rijff. On 13 November Carlee Taylor joined the team. On 21 November Anisha Vekemans, Marion Rousse, Sarah Rijkes, Molly Meyvisch, Chantal Hoffmann, Amy Cure and Isabelle Beckers signed extensions with the team.

==== Riders out ====
In July Emma Pooley announced that she intended to retire after the Commonwealth Games road race. In September Liesbet De Vocht announced her retirement. On 9 November Céline Van Severen left the team to join Lensworld.eu–Zannata for the 2015 season. On 23 November Heidi Dalton and Isabelle Söderberg left the team.

== Team roster ==
As of 10 August 2026.

Rider	Date of birth
Dina Boels (BEL)	14 January 2005 (age 21)
Julie Brouwers (BEL)	23 December 2002 (age 23)
Katrijn De Clercq (BEL)	5 February 2002 (age 24)
Elisabeth Ebras (EST)	22 July 2004 (age 22)
Romina Hinojosa (MEX)	30 November 2002 (age 23)
Marieke Meert (BEL)	7 October 1999 (age 26)
Annelies Nijssen (BEL)	23 August 2002 (age 24)

Rider	Date of birth
Linda Riedmann (GER)	23 March 2003 (age 23)
Ilken Seynave (BEL)	11 December 2006 (age 19)
Sandrine Tas (BEL)	7 September 1995 (age 30)
Lea Lin Teutenberg (GER)	2 July 1999 (age 27)
Anna van Wersch (NED)	14 August 2001 (age 25)
Sterre Vervloet (BEL)	26 November 2003 (age 22)
Lani Wittevrongel (BEL)	12 July 2004 (age 22)

== Major wins ==
2006
Overall Wolvertem-Slozen, Liesbet De Vocht

Stages 1a & 1b, Liesbet De Vocht

2007
Stage 5 Women's Tour of New Zealand, Sara Carrigan
GP Stad Roeselare, Martine Bras
Oceania Continental Road Race Championships, Kathy Watt
Overall Tour de Perth, Kathy Watt

Stages 1, 2, 3 & 4, Kathy Watt

Stage 5 Holland Ladies Tour, Martine Bras
Stage 2 (ITT) Tour of Bright, Kathy Watt

2008
Omloop Door Middag-Humsterland WE, Vera Koedooder

2009
Stages 1 & 2 Women's Tour of New Zealand, Rochelle Gilmore
Omloop Door Middag-Humsterland WE, Rochelle Gilmore
Overall Tour Féminin en Limousin, Grace Verbeke

Stage 1, Grace Verbeke

Sparkassen Giro Bochum, Rochelle Gilmore
Profronde van Surhuisterveen WE, Vera Koedooder
Mijl van Mares WE, Vera Koedooder
Stage 6 Tour Cycliste Féminin International de l'Ardèche, Lizzie Armitstead

2010
Tour of Flanders for Women, Grace Verbeke
Holland Hills Classic, Grace Verbeke
Stage 2b Trophée d'Or Féminin, Vicki Whitelaw
Overall Tour Cycliste Féminin International de l'Ardèche, Vicki Whitelaw
Commonwealth Games Road Race, Rochelle Gilmore

2011
Stage 1 Ladies Tour of Qatar, Rochelle Gilmore
Stage 2 Tour de Feminin-O cenu Českého Švýcarska, Melissa Hoskins
Profronde van Surhuisterveen WE, Melissa Hoskins

2012
Stage 4 Tour de Free State, Ashleigh Moolman
Stage 1 La Route de France, Cherise Taylor
Stage 2 Tour Cycliste Féminin International de l'Ardèche, Ashleigh Moolman

2013
Dwars door de Westhoek, Jolien D'Hoore
Holland Hills Classic, Ashleigh Moolman
Provincial Time Trial Championships (Antwerp), Anisha Vekemans

2014
Provincial Time Trial Championship (Antwerp), Anisha Vekemans
Provincial Time Trial Championship (Limburg), Isabelle Beckers
Beveren-Prosperpolder, Liesbet De Vocht
Diamond Tour, Jolien D'Hoore
Mountains classification Giro d'Italia Femminile, Emma Pooley

Stages 6, 8 & 9, Emma Pooley

Points classification BeNe Ladies Tour, Jolien D'Hoore

Stages 1 & 2b, Jolien D'Hoore

Stage 5 Holland Ladies Tour, Jolien D'Hoore

2015
Provincial Time Trial Championship (Limburg), Jessie Daams
Boortmeerbeek, Anisha Vekemans
Stage 1 Festival Luxembourgeois du cyclisme féminin Elsy Jacobs, Elena Cecchini
Stage 4 Trophée d'Or Féminin, Anisha Vekemans
UCI Track Cycling World Cup – Cambridge (Team Pursuit), Amy Cure

2016
Oostduinkerke, Anisha Vekemans
Zeswege Ladies Classic, Lotte Kopecky
Provincial Time Trial Championship (Antwerp), Anisha Vekemans
Provincial Time Trial Championship (Limburg), Isabelle Beckers
Trofee Maarten Wynants, Lotte Kopecky
Belsele–Puivelde, Lotte Kopecky
Boortmeerbeek, Élise Delzenne
Provincial Time Trial Championship (Vlaams-Brabant), Élise Delzenne
Fenioux Track Championships (Individual pursuit), Élise Delzenne
Youth classification Belgium Tour, Lotte Kopecky
Overall Trophée d'Or Féminin, Élise Delzenne

Stage 1, Élise Delzenne
Stage 5, Claudia Lichtenberg

UCI Track Cycling World Cup – Glasgow (Scratch Race), Élise Delzenne
Gent Six Days, Lotte Kopecky

2017
UCI Track Cycling World Cup – Cali (Omnium), Lotte Kopecky
Belgian International – Madison, Lotte Kopecky
Provincial Time Trial Championship (Limburg), Isabelle Beckers
Stage 2 Grand Prix Elsy Jacobs, Élise Delzenne
Niel Derny race, Lotte Kopecky
Nossegem Cyclo-cross, Julie Roelandts
Provincial Cyclo-cross Championships (Vlaams-Brabant), Julie Roelandts

2018
Stage 1 Belgium Tour, Lotte Kopecky

2019
Vuelta a la Comunitat Valenciana Feminas, Lotte Kopecky
MerXem Classic, Lotte Kopecky
Flanders Ladies Classic, Julie Van de Velde
GP de Fourmies, Nguyễn Thị Thật

2022
Wiekevorst Cyclo-cross, Sterre Vervloet
Wuustwezel Cyclo-cross, Sterre Vervloet

== National and world champions ==
2006
Australian Time Trial, Kathryn Watt
Irish Road Race, Siobhan Horgane-Dervan
Belgian Time Trial, An Van Rie
2007
Belgian Track (Individual Pursuit), Kelly Druits
Belgian Track (Keirin), Kelly Druits
Belgian Track (Team Sprint), Kelly Druits & Jenifer De Merlier
Belgian Track (Points race), Kelly Druits
Irish Road Race, Siobhan Horgane-Dervan
2008
Norwegian Road Race, Linn Torp
Dutch Track (Points Race), Vera Koedooder
2009
, British Track (Points Race), Lizzie Armitstead
Norwegian Road Race, Linn Torp
, British Track (Scratch Race), Lizzie Armitstead
2010
Australian U23 Time Trial, Josephine Tomic
Australian Track (Team Pursuit), Josephine Tomic
Belgian Time Trial, Grace Verbeke
2011
South African Time Trial, Cherise Taylor
South African Road Race, Marissa van der Merwe
African Individual Time Trial, Cherise Taylor
African Road Race, Ashleigh Moolman
2012
South African Trial, Cherise Taylor
South African Road Race, Ashleigh Moolman
African Individual Time Trial, Ashleigh Moolman
African Road Race, Ashleigh Moolman
2013
South African Time Trial, Ashleigh Moolman
South African Road Race, Ashleigh Moolman
African Time Trial, Ashleigh Moolman
African Road Race, Ashleigh Moolman
2014
Australian Track (Individual pursuit), Amy Cure
Australian Track (Team pursuit) Amy Cure
British Time Trial, Emma Pooley
Belgian Road Race, Jolien D'Hoore
2015
Australian Track (Team pursuit) Amy Cure
Australian Track (Individual pursuit) Amy Cure
World Track (Team pursuit), Amy Cure
Italy Road Race, Elena Cecchini
2016
South African Road Race, An-Li Kachelhoffer
Belgian Track (Omnium), Lotte Kopecky
Belgian U23 Time Trial, Lotte Kopecky
African Team Time Trial, An-Li Kachelhoffer
European U23 Track (Points race), Lotte Kopecky
European U23 Track (Omnium), Lotte Kopecky
France Track (Individual pursuit), Élise Delzenne
France Track (Points Race), Élise Delzenne
European Track (Madison), Lotte Kopecky
Belgian Track (Scratch race), Lotte Kopecky
Belgian Track (Points race), Lotte Kopecky
2017
Belgian Track (Omnium), Lotte Kopecky
Belgian Track (Points Race), Lotte Kopecky
Belgian Track (Scratch Race), Lotte Kopecky
World Track (Madison), Lotte Kopecky
Denmark Track (Individual Pursuit), Trine Schmidt
Denmark Track (Scratch Race), Trine Schmidt
European Track (Points race), Trine Schmidt
European Track (Scratch race), Trine Schmidt
2018
Belgian Track (Points race), Annelies Dom
Belgian Road Race, Annelies Dom
2019
Belgian Time Trial, Lotte Kopecky
2020
Belgian Time Trial, Lotte Kopecky
Belgian Road Race, Lotte Kopecky
2022
Belgian Track (Omnium), Katrijn De Clercq
Belgian Track (Points race), Katrijn De Clercq
Belgian Mountainbike (Beachrace), Mieke Docx
