= Aromitalia 3T Vaiano =

Italian cycling team

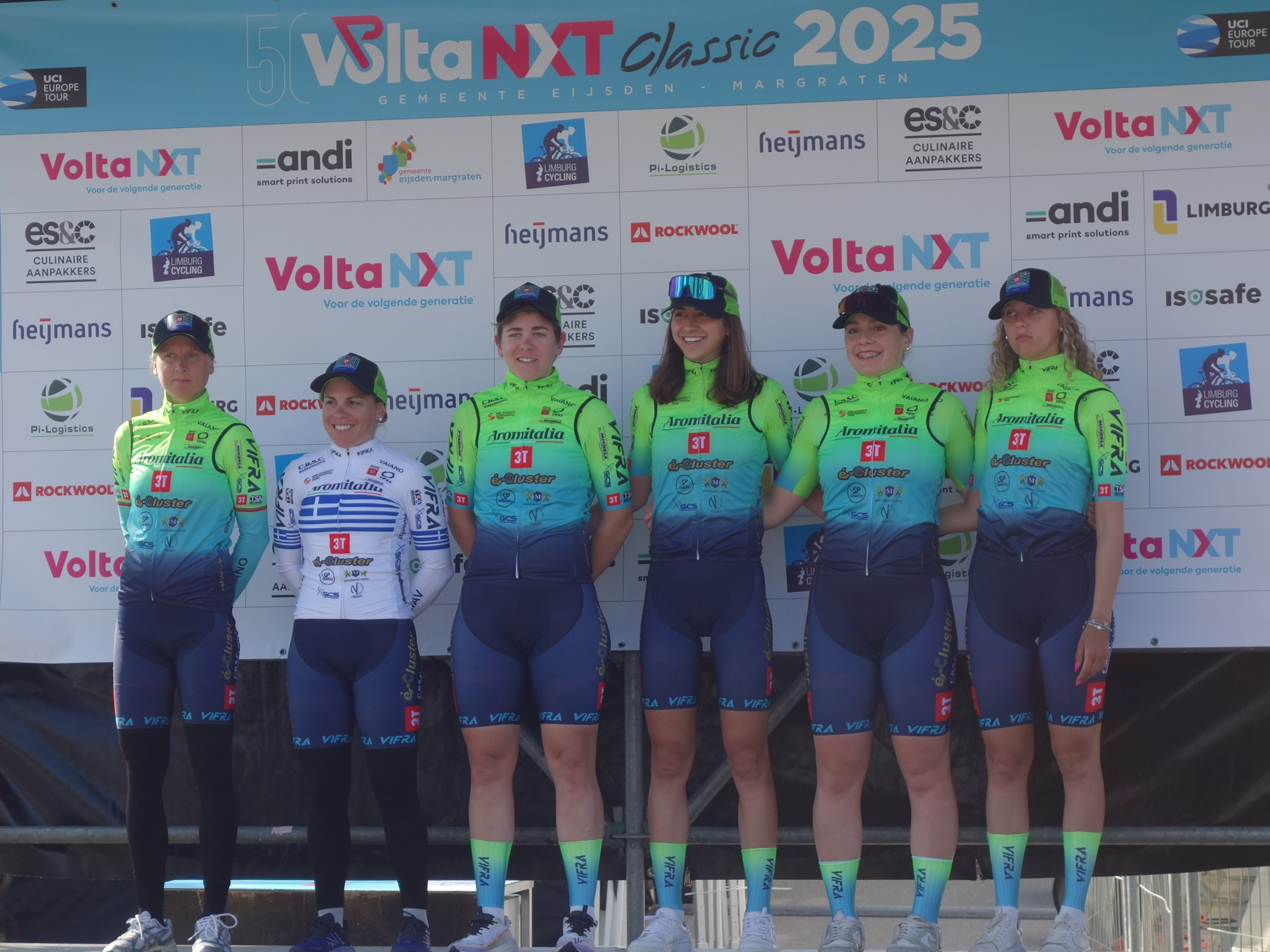

Team information
- UCI code: VAI
- Registered: Italy
- Founded: 2010
- Discipline: Road
- Status: UCI Women's Team
- Bicycles: 3T Bikes
- Website: Team home page

Team name history
- 2010–2011 2012 2013–2014 2015–2020 2021–2023 2024–: Vaiano Solaristech; Vaiano Tepso; Vaiano Fondriest; Aromitalia Vaiano; Aromitalia–Basso Bikes–Vaiano; Aromitalia 3T Vaiano

Aromitalia 3T Vaiano is a professional Women's road bicycle racing team based in Italy.

== History ==
=== 2014 ===
==== Riders in ====
Martina Biolo, Rasa Leleivytė and Allison Linnell will join the team for the 2015 season On October 31, Marta Bastianelli signed with the team. Ewelina Szybiak, Kataržina Sosna, Miriam Romei, Alessia Martini, Sérika Gulumá, Lija Laizāne and Jessica Parra signed extensions with the team.

==== Riders out ====
Sylwia Kapusta retired at the end of the season.

== Team roster ==
As of 17 January 2021.

| Rider | Date of birth |
|---|---|
| Olivija Baleišytė (LTU) | 3 September 1998 (age 28) |
| Giada Borghesi (ITA) | 27 November 2002 (age 23) |
| Letizia Borghesi (ITA) | 16 October 1998 (age 27) |
| Inga Češulienė (LTU) | 14 February 1986 (age 40) |
| Sofia Collinelli (ITA) | 24 August 2001 (age 25) |

| Rider | Date of birth |
|---|---|
| Rasa Leleivytė (LTU) | 22 July 1988 (age 38) |
| Giulia Marchesini (ITA) | 14 May 1998 (age 28) |
| Cristina Martínez (ESP) | 2 January 1996 (age 30) |
| Valentina Scandolara (ITA) | 1 May 1990 (age 36) |
| Gemma Sernissi (ITA) | 6 March 2000 (age 26) |

== Major wins ==
2010
GP Vallaton, Kataržina Sosna
Cham, Kataržina Sosna
Lancy, Valentina Scandolara
2011
GP Città di Cornaredo, Rasa Leleivytė
2015
Stage 1 Giro Toscana Int. Femminile – Memorial Michela Fanini, Marta Bastianelli
2016
Pan American ITT Championships, Sérika Gulumá
2018
Giro dell'Emilia Internazionale Donne Elite, Rasa Leleivytė
2019
Stage 4 Giro Rosa, Letizia Borghesi

== National champions ==
2010
Lithuania Time Trial, Kataržina Sosna
2011
Lithuania Road Race, Rasa Leleivytė
2014
Colombia Time Trial, Sérika Mitchell
2015
Latvia Time Trial, Lija Laizāne
Latvia Road Race, Lija Laizāne
2017
South Africa Time Trial, Heidi Dalton
Latvia Time Trial, Lija Laizāne
Latvia Road Race, Lija Laizāne
Lithuania Mountainbike (XC), Silvija Latožaitė
2018
Latvia Time Trial, Lija Laizāne
Latvia Road Race, Lija Laizāne
Lithuania Road Race, Rasa Leleivytė
2021
Lithuania Time Trial, Inga Čilvinaitė
Lithuania Road Race, Inga Čilvinaitė
2022
Lithuania Time Trial, Inga Češulienė

== Previous squads ==
=== 2016 ===
As of 1 January 2016. Ages as of 1 January 2016.

| Rider | Date of birth |
|---|---|
| Monia Baccaille (ITA) | 10 April 1984 (aged 31) |
| Beatrice Bartelloni (ITA) | 5 February 1993 (aged 22) |
| Lisa De Ranieri (ITA) | 30 July 1997 (aged 18) |
| Elena Franchi (ITA) | 26 August 1996 (aged 19) |
| Sérika Guluma Ortiz (COL) | 16 July 1990 (aged 25) |
| Lija Laizāne (LAT) | 6 July 1993 (aged 22) |

| Rider | Date of birth |
|---|---|
| Silvija Latozaite (LTU) | 20 November 1993 (aged 22) |
| Rasa Leleivytė (LTU) | 22 July 1988 (aged 27) |
| Alessia Martini (ITA) | 10 January 1992 (aged 23) |
| Nicole Nesti (ITA) | 20 September 1997 (aged 18) |
| Jessica Parra (COL) | 10 August 1995 (aged 20) |
| Alessia Bulleri (ITA) | 19 July 1993 (aged 22) |

=== 2015 ===
As of 10 March 2015. Ages as of 1 January 2015.

| Rider | Date of birth |
|---|---|
| Ewelina Szybiak (POL) | September 13, 1989 (aged 25) |
| Miriam Romei (ITA) | November 22, 1995 (aged 19) |
| Martina Biolo (ITA) | January 12, 1996 (aged 18) |
| Jessica Parra (COL) | August 10, 1995 (aged 19) |
| Alessia Martini (ITA) | January 10, 1992 (aged 22) |

| Rider | Date of birth |
|---|---|
| Allison Elizabeth Linnell (USA) | May 2, 1992 (aged 22) |
| Sérika Gulumá (COL) | July 16, 1990 (aged 24) |
| Lija Laizāne (LAT) | July 6, 1993 (aged 21) |
| Marta Bastianelli (ITA) | April 30, 1987 (aged 27) |
| Rasa Leleivytė (LTU) | July 22, 1988 (aged 26) |

=== 2014 ===
Ages as of 1 January 2014.

| Rider | Date of birth |
|---|---|
| Carlotta Brui (ITA) | May 25, 1994 (aged 19) |
| Sérika Gulumá Ortiz (COL) | July 16, 1990 (aged 23) |
| Sylwia Kapusta (POL) | December 8, 1982 (aged 31) |
| Lija Laizāne (LAT) | July 6, 1993 (aged 20) |
| Alessia Martini (ITA) | January 10, 1992 (aged 21) |
| Jessica Parra (COL) | August 10, 1995 (aged 18) |

| Rider | Date of birth |
|---|---|
| Rasa Pocyte (LTU) | August 16, 1995 (aged 18) |
| Miriam Romei (ITA) | November 22, 1995 (aged 18) |
| Kataržina Sosna (LTU) | November 30, 1990 (aged 23) |
| Ewelina Szybiak (POL) | September 13, 1989 (aged 24) |
| Chiara Vannucci (ITA) | October 25, 1993 (aged 20) |

=== 2013 ===
Ages as of 1 January 2013.

| Rider | Date of birth |
|---|---|
| Alyona Andruk (UKR) | June 11, 1987 (aged 25) |
| Valentina Bastianelli (ITA) | December 4, 1987 (aged 25) |
| Alessandra D'Ettorre (ITA) | May 8, 1978 (aged 34) |
| Barbara Guarischi (ITA) | October 2, 1990 (aged 22) |
| Sérika Gulumá Ortiz (COL) | July 16, 1990 (aged 22) |

| Rider | Date of birth |
|---|---|
| Alessia Martini (ITA) | January 10, 1992 (aged 20) |
| Aleksandra Sošenko (LTU) | January 15, 1991 (aged 21) |
| Kataržina Sosna (LTU) | November 30, 1990 (aged 22) |
| Anna Trevisi (ITA) | May 8, 1992 (aged 20) |
| Chiara Vannucci (ITA) | October 25, 1993 (aged 19) |

=== 2012 ===
Ages as of 1 January 2012.

| Rider | Date of birth |
|---|---|
| Alyona Andruk (UKR) | June 11, 1987 (aged 24) |
| Francesca Anichini (ITA) | January 19, 1992 (aged 19) |
| Valentina Bastianelli (ITA) | December 4, 1987 (aged 24) |
| Urtė Juodvalkytė (LTU) | December 23, 1986 (aged 25) |
| Leleivyte Rasa (LTU) | July 22, 1988 (aged 23) |
| Alessia Martini (ITA) | January 10, 1992 (aged 19) |

| Rider | Date of birth |
|---|---|
| Silvia Moroni (ITA) | January 9, 1992 (aged 19) |
| Aleksandra Sošenko (LTU) | January 15, 1991 (aged 20) |
| Kataržina Sosna (LTU) | November 30, 1990 (aged 21) |
| Eleonora Spaliviero (ITA) | September 7, 1989 (aged 22) |
| Anna Trevisi (ITA) | May 8, 1992 (aged 19) |

=== 2011 ===
Ages as of 1 January 2011.

| Rider | Date of birth |
|---|---|
| Francesca Anichini (ITA) | January 19, 1992 (aged 18) |
| Valentina Bastianelli (ITA) | December 4, 1987 (aged 23) |
| Irene Falorni (ITA) | January 5, 1990 (aged 20) |
| Urtė Juodvalkytė (LTU) | December 23, 1986 (aged 24) |
| Leleivyte Rasa (LTU) | July 22, 1988 (aged 22) |
| Alessia Martini (ITA) | January 10, 1992 (aged 18) |

| Rider | Date of birth |
|---|---|
| Simona Martini (ITA) | April 25, 1990 (aged 20) |
| Silvia Moroni (ITA) | January 9, 1992 (aged 18) |
| Flávia Oliveira (BRA) | October 27, 1981 (aged 29) |
| Kataržina Sosna (LTU) | November 30, 1990 (aged 20) |
| Eleonora Spaliviero (ITA) | September 7, 1989 (aged 21) |
| Chiara Vanni (ITA) | July 21, 1989 (aged 21) |
