= Sylwia Kapusta =

Polish cyclist (born 1982)

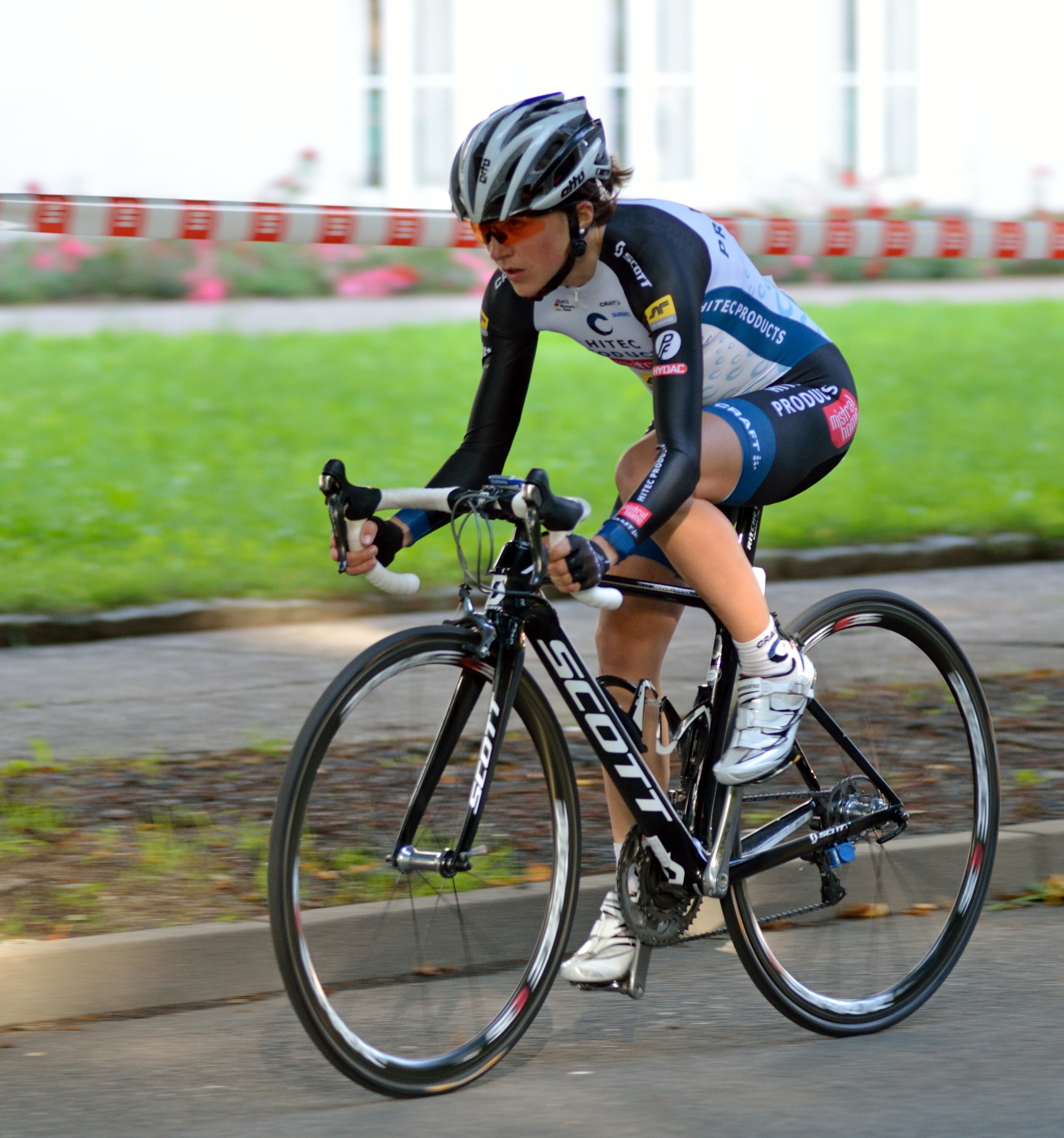
- Kapusta in 2012

Personal information
- Full name: Sylwia Kapusta-Szydłak
- Born: 8 December 1982 (age 43) Poland

Cycling career
- Sport: Cycling
- Discipline: Road cycling

Professional teams
- 2013: MCipollini–Giordana
- 2014: Vaiano–Fondriest

Sylwia Kapusta-Szydłak (born 8 December 1982) is a road cyclist from Poland. She participated at the 2007, 2008, 2009 and 2011 UCI Road World Championships.
