= Grand Prix Cycliste de Gatineau =

Canadian one-day road cycling race

Grand Prix cycliste de Gatineau
Race details
- Date: May or June
- Region: Gatineau, Canada
- Discipline: Road
- Web site: tourdegatineau.ca

History
- First edition: 2010
- Editions: 12 (as of 2024)
- First winner: Joëlle Numainville (CAN)
- Most wins: Leah Kirchmann (CAN) (2 wins)
- Most recent: Letizia Paternoster (ITA)

Grand Prix cycliste de Gatineau is an elite women's professional road race held in Canada and is currently rated by the Union Cycliste Internationale (UCI) as a 1.1 race. In the same week the Chrono Gatineau, an individual time trial event, is held.

Upon its return in 2023, the race was known as the Tour de Gatineau.

== Past winners ==
Year	Country	Rider	Team
2010	Canada	Joëlle Numainville	Webcor Builders Cycling Team
2011	Italy	Giorgia Bronzini	Colavita Forno d'Asolo
2012	Germany	Ina-Yoko Teutenberg	Team Specialized–lululemon
2013	United States	Shelley Olds	Team TIBCO–To The Top
2014	Canada	Denise Ramsden	Optum–Kelly Benefit Strategies
2015	Netherlands	Kirsten Wild	Team Hitec Products
2016	Australia	Kimberley Wells	Colavita/Bianchi
2017	Canada	Leah Kirchmann	Canada (national team)
2018	United States	Lauren Hall	UnitedHealthcare
2019	Canada	Leah Kirchmann	Canada (national team)
2020– 2022	No race due to the COVID-19 pandemic in Quebec		
2023	United States	Megan Jastrab	Team DSM
2024	Italy	Letizia Paternoster	Liv AlUla Jayco
