= Allie Legg =

American cyclist

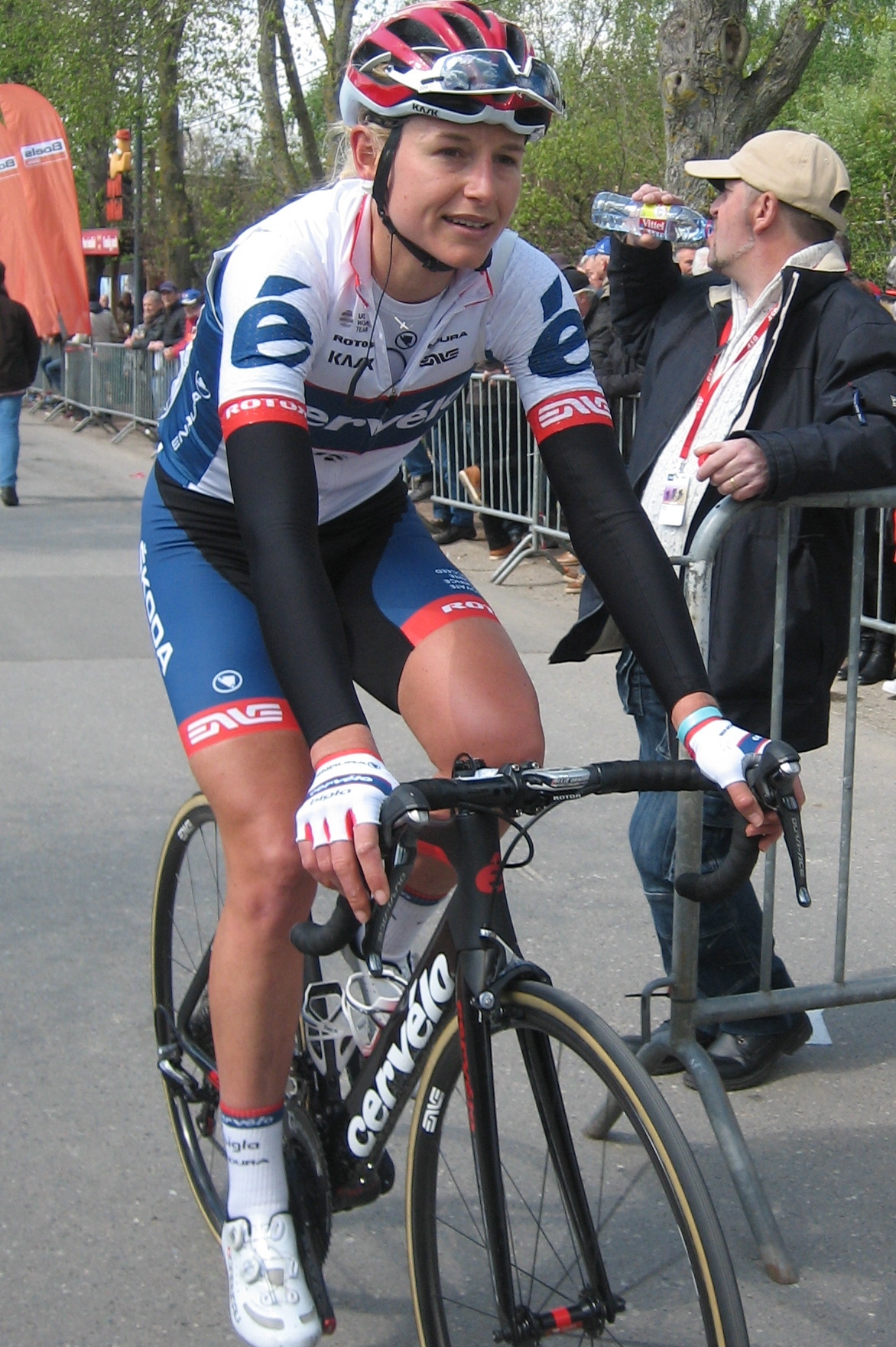
- Legg in 2017

Personal information
- Full name: Allie Legg
- Born: Allie Dragoo; December 17, 1989 (age 36) Grand Rapids, Michigan, United States
- Height: 5 ft 9 in (175 cm)

Cycling career
- Sport: Cycling
- Current team: Retired
- Disciplines: Road; Track; BMX
- Role: Rider

Amateur team
- Marian University Cycling Team

Professional teams
- 2014–2016: Twenty16
- 2017: Cervélo–Bigla Pro Cycling
- 2017–2019: Sho-Air Twenty20

Allie Legg (née Dragoo; born December 17, 1989) is an American former professional racing cyclist, who rode professionally between 2014 and 2019. She rode in the women's team time trial at the 2015 UCI Road World Championships.

She started her bike racing career in BMX, competing for thirteen years including two as a professional. She was offered a collegiate golf scholarship, but turned it down in order to pursue cycle racing, and graduated from Marian University, Indiana with a degree in Education and Physical Education in May 2014.

Retired from professional cycling in 2019, Allie is now a cycling coach for Fascat Coaching + Training.

== Major results ==
2014
3rd Andersen Banducci Twilight Criterium
4th Overall Valley of the Sun
2015
1st Overall Chico Stage Race

1st Stage 3 (ITT)

1st Andersen Banducci Twilight Criterium
2nd Overall Valley of the Sun
3rd Overall San Dimas Stage Race
3rd Overall Redlands Bicycle Classic
5th Team time trial, UCI Road World Championships
5th Overall Tour of Utah

1st Stage 1

5th Overall Tour of Colorado
7th Overall Tour of the Gila
National Road Championships

8th Time trial
9th Road race

2016
1st Overall Valley of the Sun

1st Stage 1 (ITT)

1st Overall Chico Stage Race

1st Stage 3 (ITT)

1st Stage 3 Energiewacht Tour
1st Stage 2 (TTT) Tour of California
5th Team time trial, UCI Road World Championships
6th Overall Cascade Cycling Classic
2017
1st Overall Cascade Cycling Classic
9th Overall Tour of Colorado
2018
1st Overall Chico Stage Race

1st Stage 3 (ITT)

6th Chrono Gatineau
7th Overall Valley of the Sun
2019
7th Chrono Kristin Armstrong
