= 2015 Women's Tour of New Zealand =

Race details
- Dates: 18–22 February
- Stages: 5
- Distance: 520.5 km (323.4 mi)
- Winning time: 14h 21' 57"

Results
Jersey awarded to the overall winner	Winner	Tayler Wiles (USA)	(United States (national team))
	Second	Megan Guarnier (USA)	(United States (national team))
	Third	Evelyn Stevens (USA)	(United States (national team))
Jersey awarded to the mountains classification winner	Mountains	Joanne Hogan (AUS)	(Team TIBCO–SVB)
Jersey awarded to the youth classification winner	Youth	Ellen Skerritt (AUS)	(High5 Dream Team)
Jersey awarded to the sprints classification winner	Sprints	Hannah van Kampen (NZL)	(Ramblers Club)
	Team	United States (national team)	

The 2015 Trust House Women's Tour of New Zealand was the first edition of the revived Women's Tour of New Zealand held in New Zealand, with a UCI rating of 2.2. It was held over 18 to 22 February. The race was won by Tayler Wiles, riding for a United States national team, ahead of her team mates Megan Guarnier and Evelyn Stevens.

== Teams ==
=== UCI women's teams ===
- Team TIBCO–SVB
- Pepper Palace p/b The Happy Tooth

=== Elite teams ===
- DNA Cycling p/b K4
- High5 Dream Team
- Holden Racing Team
- 3Sixty Sports
- Ramblers Club
- Fagan Motors Cycling Team
- The Sign Factory

=== National teams ===
- United States
- Australia
- New Zealand
- Japan

== Stages ==
=== Stage 1 ===
18 February 2015 — Masterton to Masterton, 15 km (9.3 mi), team time trial (TTT)

Stage 1 result
Rank	Team	Time
1	United States (national team)	18' 49"
2	Australia (national team)	+ 18"
3	Team TIBCO–SVB	+ 42"
4	Holden Racing Team	+ 1' 05"
5	Ramblers Club	+ 1' 15"
6	High5 Dream Team	+ 1' 30"
7	Pepper Palace p/b The Happy Tooth	+ 1' 33"
8	DNA Cycling p/b K4 Racing	+ 1' 38"
9	New Zealand (national team)	+ 1' 45"
10	Japan (national team)	+ 2' 12"

General classification after stage 1
Rank	Rider	Team	Time
1	Megan Guarnier (USA)	United States (national team)	18' 49"
2	Lauren Hall (USA)	United States (national team)	+ 0"
3	Lauren Komanski (USA)	United States (national team)	+ 0"
4	Evelyn Stevens (USA)	United States (national team)	+ 0"
5	Tayler Wiles (USA)	United States (national team)	+ 0"
6	Lauren Kitchen (AUS)	Australia (national team)	+ 18"
7	Katrin Garfoot (AUS)	Australia (national team)	+ 18"
8	Rachel Neylan (AUS)	Australia (national team)	+ 18"
9	Alexandra Manly (AUS)	Australia (national team)	+ 18"
10	Rebecca Mackey (AUS)	Australia (national team)	+ 18"

=== Stage 2 ===
19 February 2015 — Masterton to Solway, 142 km (88.2 mi)

Stage 2 result
Rank	Rider	Team	Time
1	Lauren Hall (USA)	United States (national team)	3h 57' 50"
2	Lauren Kitchen (AUS)	Australia (national team)	+ 1"
3	Georgia Baker (AUS)	High5 Dream Team	+ 1"
4	Emily Collins (NZL)	Team TIBCO–SVB	+ 1"
5	Katrin Garfoot (AUS)	Australia (national team)	+ 1"
6	Jessica Mundy (AUS)	High5 Dream Team	+ 1"
7	Ruth Corset (AUS)	Fagan Motors Cycling Team	+ 1"
8	Miranda Griffiths (AUS)	Holden Racing Team	+ 1"
9	Lucy Coldwell (GBR)	Holden Racing Team	+ 1"
10	Karen Fulton (NZL)	Pepper Palace p/b The Happy Tooth	+ 1"

General classification after stage 2
Rank	Rider	Team	Time
1	Lauren Hall (USA)	United States (national team)	4h 16' 39"
2	Megan Guarnier (USA)	United States (national team)	+ 1"
3	Evelyn Stevens (USA)	United States (national team)	+ 1"
4	Lauren Komanski (USA)	United States (national team)	+ 1"
5	Tayler Wiles (USA)	United States (national team)	+ 1"
6	Lauren Kitchen (AUS)	Australia (national team)	+ 19"
7	Katrin Garfoot (AUS)	Australia (national team)	+ 19"
8	Alexandra Manly (AUS)	Australia (national team)	+ 19"
9	Rachel Neylan (AUS)	Australia (national team)	+ 19"
10	Rebecca Mackey (AUS)	Australia (national team)	+ 19"

=== Stage 3 ===
20 February 2015 — Carrington to Carrington, 130 km (80.8 mi)

Stage 3 result
Rank	Rider	Team	Time
1	Katrin Garfoot (AUS)	Australia (national team)	3h 41' 18"
2	Megan Guarnier (USA)	United States (national team)	+ 0"
3	Lauren Stephens (USA)	Team TIBCO–SVB	+ 0"
4	Ruth Corset (AUS)	Fagan Motors Cycling Team	+ 0"
5	Lucy Coldwell (GBR)	Holden Racing Team	+ 0"
6	Miranda Griffiths (AUS)	Holden Racing Team	+ 0"
7	Tessa Fabry (AUS)	High5 Dream Team	+ 0"
8	Rachel Neylan (AUS)	Australia (national team)	+ 0"
9	Evelyn Stevens (USA)	United States (national team)	+ 3"
10	Gabrielle Pilote Fortin (CAN)	DNA Cycling p/b K4 Racing	+ 1' 25"

General classification after stage 3
Rank	Rider	Team	Time
1	Megan Guarnier (USA)	United States (national team)	7h 57' 58"
2	Evelyn Stevens (USA)	United States (national team)	+ 3"
3	Katrin Garfoot (AUS)	Australia (national team)	+ 18"
4	Rachel Neylan (AUS)	Australia (national team)	+ 18"
5	Lauren Stephens (USA)	Team TIBCO–SVB	+ 42"
6	Lucy Coldwell (GBR)	Holden Racing Team	+ 1' 05"
7	Miranda Griffiths (AUS)	Holden Racing Team	+ 1' 05"
8	Tessa Fabry (AUS)	High5 Dream Team	+ 1' 30"
9	Ruth Corset (AUS)	Fagan Motors Cycling Team	+ 2' 25"
10	Gabrielle Pilote Fortin (CAN)	DNA Cycling p/b K4 Racing	+ 3' 03"

=== Stage 4 ===
21 February 2015 — Masterton to Admiral Hill, 111 km (69.0 mi)

Stage 4 result
Rank	Rider	Team	Time
1	Tayler Wiles (USA)	United States (national team)	3h 06' 04"
2	Lauren Kitchen (AUS)	Australia (national team)	+ 1"
3	Joanne Hogan (AUS)	Team TIBCO–SVB	+ 5"
4	Ellen Skerritt (AUS)	High5 Dream Team	+ 17"
5	Lauren Hall (USA)	United States (national team)	+ 24"
6	Denise Ramsden (CAN)	Pepper Palace p/b The Happy Tooth	+ 2' 25"
7	Linda Villumsen (NZL)	Ramblers Club	+ 2' 25"
8	Evelyn Stevens (USA)	United States (national team)	+ 3' 11"
9	Megan Guarnier (USA)	United States (national team)	+ 3' 11"
10	Katrin Garfoot (AUS)	Australia (national team)	+ 3' 11"

General classification after stage 4
Rank	Rider	Team	Time
1	Tayler Wiles (USA)	United States (national team)	11h 07' 07"
2	Megan Guarnier (USA)	United States (national team)	+ 6"
3	Evelyn Stevens (USA)	United States (national team)	+ 9"
4	Lauren Kitchen (AUS)	Australia (national team)	+ 19"
5	Lauren Hall (USA)	United States (national team)	+ 23"
6	Katrin Garfoot (AUS)	Australia (national team)	+ 24"
7	Rachel Neylan (AUS)	Australia (national team)	+ 27"
8	Lauren Stephens (USA)	Team TIBCO–SVB	+ 48"
9	Joanne Hogan (AUS)	Team TIBCO–SVB	+ 51"
10	Miranda Griffiths (AUS)	Holden Racing Team	+ 1' 16"

=== Stage 5 ===
22 February 2015 — Masterton to Masterton, 122.5 km (76.1 mi)

Stage 5 result
Rank	Rider	Team	Time
1	Lauren Hall (USA)	United States (national team)	3h 14' 50"
2	Georgia Baker (AUS)	High5 Dream Team	+ 0"
3	Emily Collins (NZL)	Team TIBCO–SVB	+ 0"
4	Lauren Kitchen (AUS)	Australia (national team)	+ 0"
5	Ruth Corset (AUS)	Fagan Motors Cycling Team	+ 0"
6	Jessica Mundy (AUS)	High5 Dream Team	+ 0"
7	Megan Guarnier (USA)	United States (national team)	+ 0"
8	Lauren Stephens (USA)	Team TIBCO–SVB	+ 0"
9	Denise Ramsden (CAN)	Pepper Palace p/b The Happy Tooth	+ 0"
10	Tayler Wiles (USA)	United States (national team)	+ 0"

Final general classification
Rank	Rider	Team	Time
1	Tayler Wiles (USA)	United States (national team)	14h 21' 57"
2	Megan Guarnier (USA)	United States (national team)	+ 6"
3	Evelyn Stevens (USA)	United States (national team)	+ 12"
4	Lauren Kitchen (AUS)	Australia (national team)	+ 19"
5	Lauren Hall (USA)	United States (national team)	+ 23"
6	Katrin Garfoot (AUS)	Australia (national team)	+ 27"
7	Rachel Neylan (AUS)	Australia (national team)	+ 30"
8	Lauren Stephens (USA)	Team TIBCO–SVB	+ 48"
9	Joanne Hogan (AUS)	Team TIBCO–SVB	+ 54"
10	Miranda Griffiths (AUS)	Holden Racing Team	+ 1' 19"

== Classification leadership ==
Stage	Winner	General classification	Sprints classification	Mountain classification	Young rider classification	Team classification
1	United States (national team)	Megan Guarnier	Not awarded	Not awarded	Alexandra Manly	United States (national team)
2	Lauren Hall	Lauren Hall	Megan Guarnier	Megan Guarnier	Alexandra Manly	United States (national team)
3	Katrin Garfoot	Megan Guarnier	Megan Guarnier	Evelyn Stevens	Gabrielle Pilote Fortin	United States (national team)
4	Tayler Wiles	Tayler Wiles	Hannah van Kampen	Joanne Hogan	Ellen Skerritt	United States (national team)
5	Lauren Hall	Tayler Wiles	Hannah van Kampen	Joanne Hogan	Ellen Skerritt	United States (national team)
Final		Tayler Wiles	Hannah van Kampen	Joanne Hogan	Ellen Skerritt	United States (national team)
