= 2016 UCI Road World Championships – Women's team time trial =

Cycling race

Women's team time trial
2016 UCI Road World Championships

Race details
- Dates: 9 October 2016
- Stages: 1
- Distance: 40 km (25 mi)
- Winning time: 48' 41.62"

Medalists
	Gold	(Netherlands) Boels–Dolmans
	Silver	(Germany) Canyon//SRAM
	Bronze	(Germany) Cervélo–Bigla Pro Cycling

The Women's team time trial of the 2016 UCI Road World Championships was a cycling event that took place on 9 October 2016 in Doha, Qatar.

Boels–Dolmans won the race at an average speed of 49.288 kilometres per hour (30.626 mph), 48.24 seconds faster than the German team Canyon//SRAM. The bronze medal went to Cervélo–Bigla Pro Cycling from Germany, almost 2 minutes behind Boels–Dolmans.

Amongst the winning riders for Boels–Dolmans, Evelyn Stevens won her fourth team time trial world championships (after 2012, 2013 and 2014), while Ellen van Dijk (after 2012 and 2013) and Karol-Ann Canuel (after 2014 and 2015) won their third titles and Chantal Blaak took her second (after 2014).

== Course ==
The race started at the Lusail Sports Complex and finished at The Pearl Island, after a flat course of 40 kilometres (25 miles). There were intermediate time checks after 13.6 kilometres (8.5 miles) and 26.4 kilometres (16.4 miles).

== Qualification ==
The following UCI Women's Teams in the UCI Team Ranking as of 15 August 2016 were invited to take part. Teams in bold elected to compete in the race.

#	Nat	Team
1	(Italy)	Alé–Cipollini
2	(Italy)	Aromitalia Vaiano
3	(Kazakhstan)	Astana
4	(Italy)	**Bepink**
5	(Netherlands)	**Boels–Dolmans**
6	(Slovenia)	**BTC City Ljubljana**
7	(Germany)	**Canyon//SRAM**
8	(Germany)	**Cervélo–Bigla Pro Cycling**
9	(United States)	Colavita/Bianchi
10	(United States)	Cylance Pro Cycling
11	(Norway)	**Team Hitec Products**
12	(Italy)	Inpa–Bianchi
13	(Belgium)	Lares–Waowdeals
14	(Belgium)	Lensworld–Zannata
15	(Belgium)	Lotto–Soudal Ladies
16	(Australia)	Orica–AIS
17	(Netherlands)	Parkhotel Valkenburg Continental Team
18	(France)	Poitou-Charentes.Futuroscope.86
19	(Netherlands)	**Rabobank-Liv Woman Cycling Team**
20	(United States)	Rally Cycling
21	(Italy)	S.C. Michela Fanini Rox
22	(Italy)	Servetto Footon
23	(Denmark)	Team BMS BIRN
24	(Netherlands)	Team Liv–Plantur
25	(United States)	Tibco–Silicon Valley Bank
26	(Italy)	Top Girls Fassa Bortolo
27	(Belgium)	Topsport Vlaanderen–Etixx–Guill D'or
28	(United States)	**Twenty16–Ridebiker**
29	(United States)	UnitedHealthcare
30	(United Kingdom)	Wiggle High5

== Preview ==
Only eight teams were at the start of the race. The previous four editions were won by the former Velocio–SRAM team by different riders each year.

== Race ==
The race took place in 38 °C (100 °F) heat, with not a great atmosphere, criticised by several teams and riders.

Boels–Dolmans, with Ellen van Dijk as the main engine, were second at the first intermediate time point, 9.21 seconds behind Canyon//SRAM after 13.6 kilometres (8.5 miles). Relative to the other teams, Boels–Dolmans accelerated afterwards; the team was 24 seconds faster in the second part of the race relative to Canyon//SRAM and was 15 seconds faster at the second intermediate time point. Finally Boels–Dolmans was 48.24 seconds faster than Canyon//SRAM at the finish line and almost two minutes faster than Cervélo–Bigla Pro Cycling.

== Final classification ==
Rank	Team	Riders	Time
1	(Netherlands) Boels–Dolmans	Chantal Blaak (NED); Karol-Ann Canuel (CAN); Lizzie Deignan (GBR); Christine Majerus (LUX); Evelyn Stevens (USA); Ellen van Dijk (NED)	48' 41.62"
2	(Germany) Canyon//SRAM	Alena Amialiusik (BLR); Hannah Barnes (GBR); Lisa Brennauer (DEU); Elena Cecchini (ITA); Mieke Kröger (DEU); Trixi Worrack (DEU)	+ 48.24"
3	(Germany) Cervélo–Bigla Pro Cycling	Ciara Horne (GBR); Lisa Klein (DEU); Lotta Lepistö (FIN); Ashleigh Moolman (RSA); Joëlle Numainville (CAN); Stephanie Pohl (DEU)	+ 1' 56.47"
4	(Italy) Bepink	Amber Neben (USA); Francesca Pattaro (ITA); Ilaria Sanguineti (ITA); Silvia Valsecchi (ITA); Georgia Williams (NZL); Olga Zabelinskaya (RUS)	+ 2' 46.03"
5	(United States) Twenty16–Ridebiker	Kristin Armstrong (USA); Allie Dragoo (USA); Chloé Dygert (USA); Annie Foreman-Mackey (CAN); Alison Jackson (CAN); Leah Thomas (USA)	+ 2' 46.73"
6	(Norway) Team Hitec Products	Charlotte Becker (DEU); Cecilie Gotaas Johnsen (NOR); Julie Leth (DNK); Emilie Moberg (NOR); Thea Thorsen (NOR); Kirsten Wild (NED)	+ 3' 23.52"
7	(Slovenia) BTC City Ljubljana	Polona Batagelj (SLO); Eugenia Bujak (POL); Corinna Lechner (DEU); Olena Pavlukhina (AZE); Anna Plichta (POL); Mia Radotić (CRO)	+ 3' 43.10"
8	(Netherlands) Rabobank-Liv Woman Cycling Team	Shara Gillow (AUS); Roxane Knetemann (NED); Anouska Koster (NED); Katarzyna Niewiadoma (POL); Moniek Tenniglo (NED); Anna van der Breggen (NED)	+ 6' 03.33"
