= Lex Albrecht =

Canadian cyclist (born 1987)

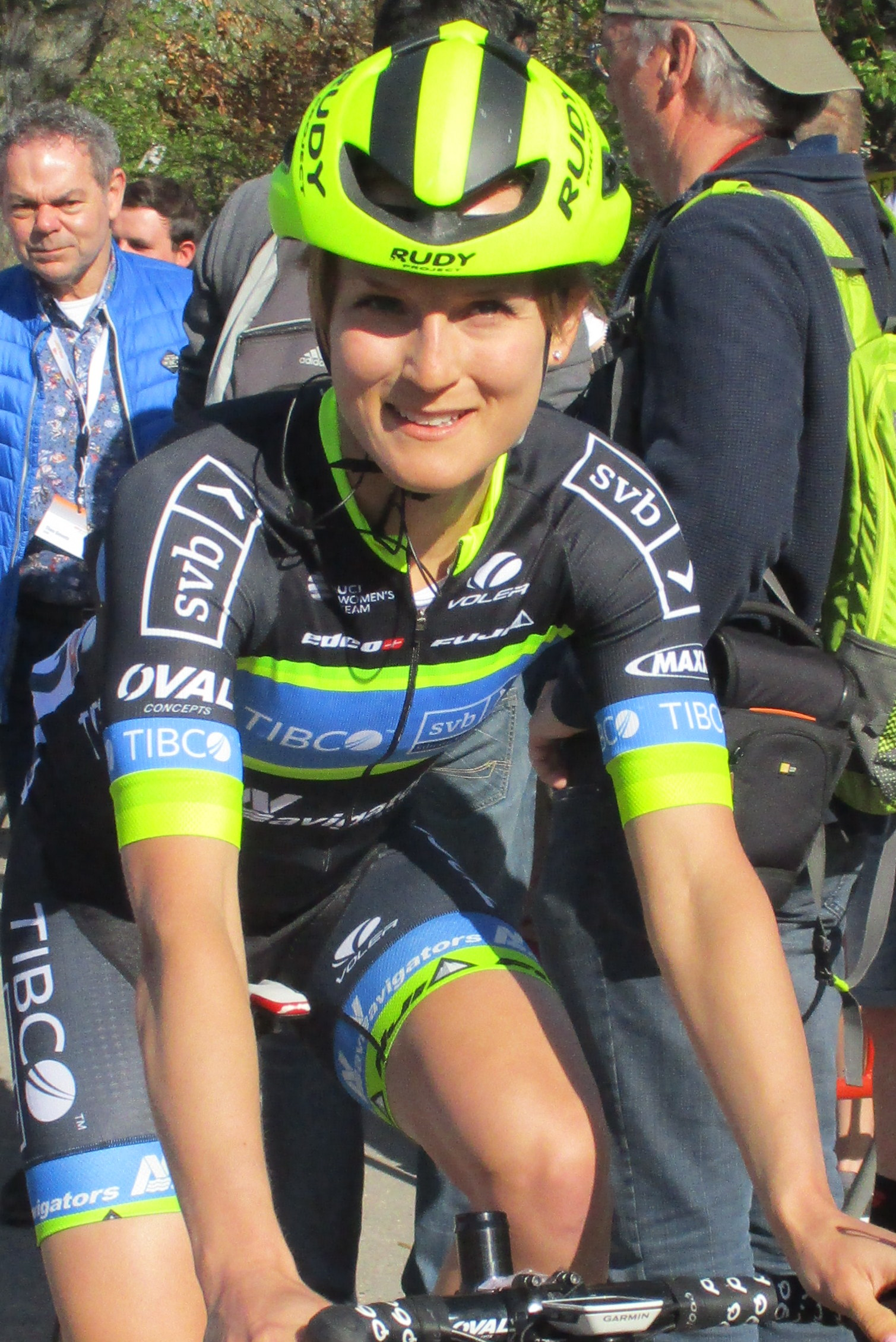
- Albrecht at the 2018 La Flèche Wallonne Féminine

Personal information
- Full name: Lex Albrecht
- Born: 6 April 1987 (age 39) Barrie, Ontario, Canada
- Height: 5 ft 4 in (163 cm)
- Weight: 115 lb (52 kg)

Cycling career
- Sport: Cycling
- Disciplines: Road; Gravel
- Role: Rider
- Rider type: Climbing specialist

Amateur teams
- 2009: Équipe du Québec
- 2010: Equipe Cascades–ABC Cycles
- 2021: Fearless Femme Racing

Professional teams
- 2011: Juvederm–Specialized
- 2012: Optum Pro Cycling
- 2013: NOW and Novartis for MS
- 2014: Twenty16
- 2015: Optum–KBS
- 2016: Bepink
- 2017–2019: Tibco–Silicon Valley Bank

Lex Albrecht (born 6 April 1987) is a Canadian racing cyclist, who most recently rode for American amateur team Fearless Femme Racing. She competed in the 2013 UCI women's road race in Florence.

== Major results ==
2011
2nd Road race, National Road Championships
2013
2nd Road race, Jeux de la Francophonie
National Road Championships

3rd Road race
7th Time trial

6th Philadelphia Cycling Classic
10th Chrono Gatineau
2014
1st Overall Tour de Murrieta
2nd Philadelphia Cycling Classic
4th Grand Prix cycliste de Gatineau
6th Winston-Salem Cycling Classic
2015
San Dimas Stage Race

1st Mountains classification
1st Stage 2

1st Mountains classification Redlands Bicycle Classic
8th Time trial, National Road Championships
8th Philadelphia Cycling Classic
9th Overall Tour of California
2016
7th Overall La Route de France
10th Road race, National Road Championships
10th Winston-Salem Cycling Classic
2017
1st Stage 2 Tour of the Gila
1st Stage 2 Thüringen Rundfahrt der Frauen
6th Winston-Salem Cycling Classic
