= 2016 Tour of California (women's race) =

2016 Amgen Tour of California Women's Race
2016 UCI Women's World Tour, race 8 of 17

Race details
- Dates: 19–22 May 2016
- Stages: 4
- Distance: 314.3 km (195.3 mi)
- Winning time: 8h 00' 31"

Results
Jersey awarded to the overall winner	Winner	Megan Guarnier (USA)	(Boels–Dolmans)
	Second	Kristin Armstrong (USA)	(Twenty16–Ridebiker)
	Third	Evelyn Stevens (USA)	(Boels–Dolmans)
Jersey awarded to the mountains classification winner	Mountains	Mara Abbott (USA)	(Wiggle High5)
Jersey awarded to the youth classification winner	Youth	Chloé Dygert (USA)	(Twenty16–Ridebiker)
Jersey awarded to the sprints classification winner	Sprints	Megan Guarnier (USA)	(Boels–Dolmans)
	Team	Twenty16–Ridebiker	

The 2016 Amgen Tour of California Women's Race (also known as the Amgen Breakaway From Heart Disease Women's Race Empowered by SRAM for sponsorship reasons) was the second edition of the Tour of California Women's Race cycling stage race. It is scheduled to run from 19 to 22 May 2016, and is part of the 2016 UCI Women's World Tour. It will begin in South Lake Tahoe and finish in Sacramento.

== Schedule ==
List of stages
Stage	Date	Course	Distance	Type	Winner
1	19 May	South Lake Tahoe – South Lake Tahoe	117.0 km (72.7 mi)	Hilly stage	Megan Guarnier (USA)
2	20 May	Folsom – Folsom	20.3 km (12.6 mi)	Team time trial	Twenty16–Ridebiker
3	21 May	Santa Rosa – Santa Rosa	111.0 km (69.0 mi)	Hilly stage	Marianne Vos (NED)
4	22 May	Sacramento – Sacramento	66.0 km (41.0 mi)	Flat stage	Kirsten Wild (NED)
Total			314.3 km (195.3 mi)		

== Teams ==
UCI Women's teams	National teams
Bepink; Boels–Dolmans; Canyon//SRAM; Colavita/Bianchi; Cylance Pro Cycling; Drops; Hagens Berman–Supermint; Team Hitec Products; Podium Ambition Pro Cycling; Rabobank-Liv Woman Cycling Team; Rally Cycling; Tibco–Silicon Valley Bank; Twenty16–Ridebiker; UnitedHealthcare; Visit Dallas DNA Pro Cycling; Weber Shimano Ladies Power; Wiggle High5	United States of America

== Results ==
=== Stage 1 ===
19 May 2016 – South Lake Tahoe – South Lake Tahoe, 117.0 km (72.7 mi)

Stage 1 Result

Rank	Rider	Team	Time
1	Megan Guarnier (USA)	Boels–Dolmans	3h 05' 09"
2	Emma Johansson (SWE)	Wiggle High5	+ 4"
3	Kristin Armstrong (USA)	Twenty16–Ridebiker	+ 10"
4	Evelyn Stevens (USA)	Boels–Dolmans	+ 10"
5	Marianne Vos (NED)	Rabobank-Liv Woman Cycling Team	+ 10"
6	Rossella Ratto (ITA)	Cylance Pro Cycling	+ 16"
7	Coryn Rivera (USA)	UnitedHealthcare	+ 16"
8	Shara Gillow (AUS)	Rabobank-Liv Woman Cycling Team	+ 18"
9	Tayler Wiles (USA)	United States (national team)	+ 18"
10	Katie Hall (USA)	UnitedHealthcare	+ 18"

General Classification after Stage 1

Rank	Rider	Team	Time
1	Megan Guarnier (USA)	Boels–Dolmans	3h 04' 57"
2	Emma Johansson (SWE)	Wiggle High5	+ 10"
3	Kristin Armstrong (USA)	Twenty16–Ridebiker	+ 18"
4	Evelyn Stevens (USA)	Boels–Dolmans	+ 22"
5	Marianne Vos (NED)	Rabobank-Liv Woman Cycling Team	+ 22"
6	Rossella Ratto (ITA)	Cylance Pro Cycling	+ 28"
7	Coryn Rivera (USA)	UnitedHealthcare	+ 28"
8	Shara Gillow (AUS)	Rabobank-Liv Woman Cycling Team	+ 30"
9	Tayler Wiles (USA)	United States (national team)	+ 30"
10	Katie Hall (USA)	UnitedHealthcare	+ 30"

=== Stage 2 ===
20 May 2016 – Folsom – Folsom: TTT, 20.3 km (12.6 mi)

Stage 2 Result

Rank	Team	Time
1	(United States) Twenty16–Ridebiker	27' 33"
2	(Netherlands) Boels–Dolmans	+ 6"
3	(United States) UnitedHealthcare	+ 25"
4	(Netherlands) Rabobank-Liv Woman Cycling Team	+ 34"
5	(Germany) Canyon//SRAM	+ 36"
6	(United States) Tibco–Silicon Valley Bank	+ 55"
7	(United Kingdom) Wiggle High5	+ 58"
8	(Norway) Team Hitec Products	+ 1' 08"
9	(United Kingdom) Podium Ambition Pro Cycling	+ 1' 12"
10	(United States) Colavita/Bianchi	+ 1' 55"

General Classification after Stage 2

Rank	Rider	Team	Time
1	Megan Guarnier (USA)	Boels–Dolmans	3h 32' 36"
2	Kristin Armstrong (USA)	Twenty16–Ridebiker	+ 12"
3	Evelyn Stevens (USA)	Boels–Dolmans	+ 22"
4	Leah Thomas (USA)	Twenty16–Ridebiker	+ 44"
5	Coryn Rivera (USA)	UnitedHealthcare	+ 47"
6	Katie Hall (USA)	UnitedHealthcare	+ 49"
7	Marianne Vos (NED)	Rabobank-Liv Woman Cycling Team	+ 50"
8	Chloé Dygert (USA)	Twenty16–Ridebiker	+ 53"
9	Shara Gillow (AUS)	Rabobank-Liv Woman Cycling Team	+ 58"
10	Emma Johansson (SWE)	Wiggle High5	+ 1' 02"

=== Stage 3 ===
21 May 2016 – Santa Rosa – Santa Rosa, 111.0 km (69.0 mi)

Stage 3 Result

Rank	Rider	Team	Time
1	Marianne Vos (NED)	Rabobank-Liv Woman Cycling Team	2h 51' 52"
2	Coryn Rivera (USA)	UnitedHealthcare	s.t.
3	Emma Johansson (SWE)	Wiggle High5	s.t.
4	Megan Guarnier (USA)	Boels–Dolmans	s.t.
5	Brianna Walle (USA)	Tibco–Silicon Valley Bank	s.t.
6	Alena Amialiusik (BLR)	Canyon//SRAM	s.t.
7	Heather Fischer (USA)	Rally Cycling	s.t.
8	Chloé Dygert (USA)	Twenty16–Ridebiker	s.t.
9	Lauren Stephens (USA)	Tibco–Silicon Valley Bank	s.t.
10	Danielle King (GB)	Wiggle High5	s.t.

General Classification after Stage 3

Rank	Rider	Team	Time
1	Megan Guarnier (USA)	Boels–Dolmans	6h 25' 24"
2	Kristin Armstrong (USA)	Twenty16–Ridebiker	+ 15"
3	Evelyn Stevens (USA)	Boels–Dolmans	+ 25"
4	Marianne Vos (NED)	Rabobank-Liv Woman Cycling Team	+ 43"
5	Coryn Rivera (USA)	UnitedHealthcare	+ 44"
6	Leah Thomas (USA)	Twenty16–Ridebiker	+ 47"
7	Katie Hall (USA)	UnitedHealthcare	+ 52"
8	Chloé Dygert (USA)	Twenty16–Ridebiker	+ 56"
9	Emma Johansson (SWE)	Wiggle High5	+ 1' 01"
10	Shara Gillow (AUS)	Rabobank-Liv Woman Cycling Team	+ 1' 06"

=== Stage 4 ===
22 May 2016 – Sacramento – Sacramento, 66.0 km (41.0 mi)

== Classification leadership ==
Stage	Winner	General classification	Youth classification	Mountains classification	Points classification	Most courageous	Team classification
1	Megan Guarnier	Megan Guarnier	Rosella Ratto	Megan Guarnier	Megan Guarnier	Sarah Storey	Wiggle High5
2 (TTT)	Twenty16–Ridebiker	Megan Guarnier	Chloé Dygert	Megan Guarnier	Megan Guarnier	not awarded	Twenty16–Ridebiker
3	Marianne Vos	Megan Guarnier	Chloé Dygert	Mara Abbott	Megan Guarnier	Mara Abbott	Twenty16–Ridebiker
4	Kirsten Wild	Megan Guarnier	Chloé Dygert	Mara Abbott	Megan Guarnier	Shara Gillow	Twenty16–Ridebiker
Final		Megan Guarnier	Chloé Dygert	Mara Abbott	Megan Guarnier	not awarded	Twenty16–Ridebiker
