= Romina Hinojosa =

Mexican cyclist (born 2002)

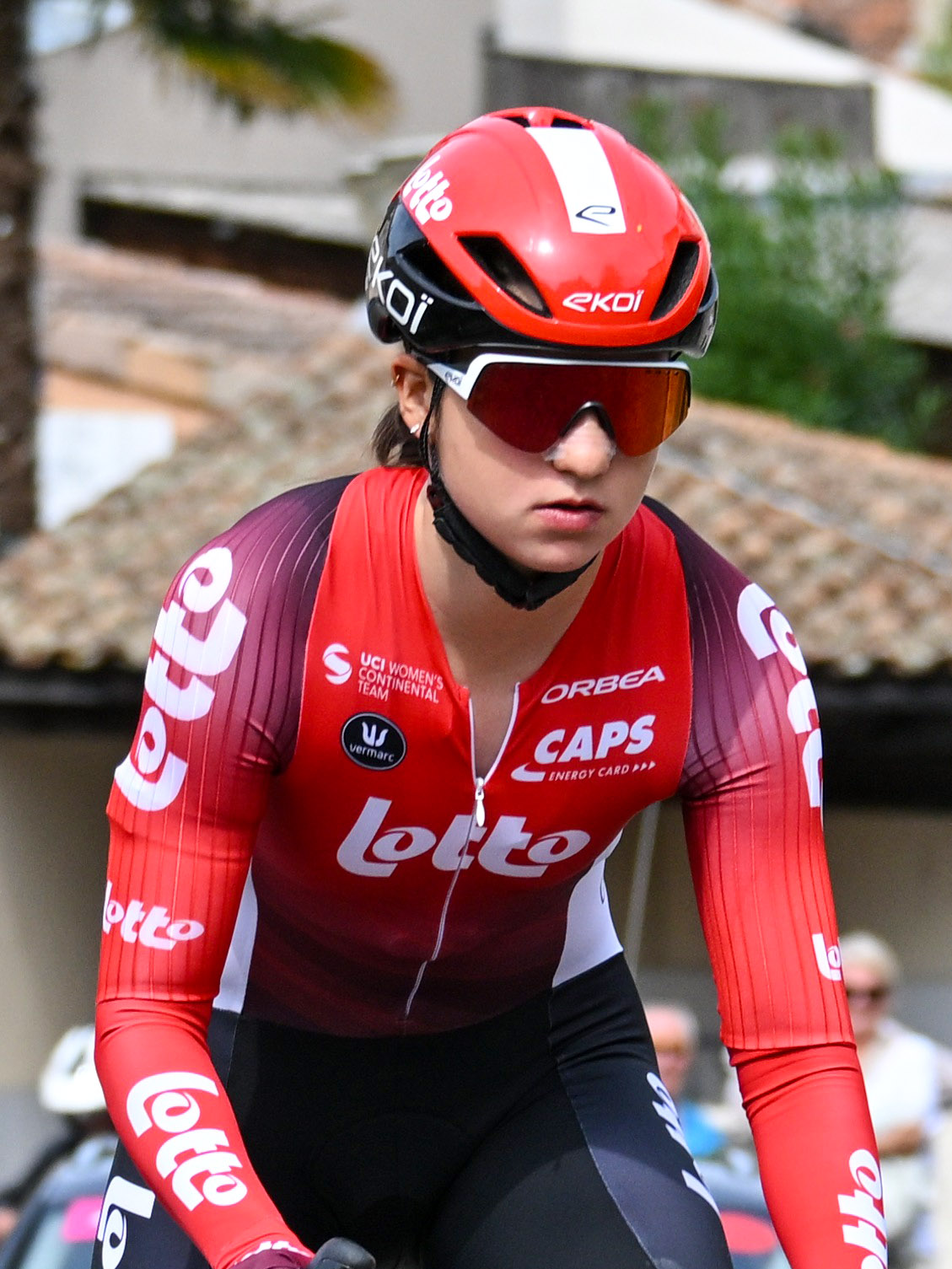
- Hinojosa at the Tour Cycliste Féminin International de l'Ardèche in 2025

Personal information
- Full name: Romina Hinojosa Cruz
- Born: 30 November 2002 Tampico, Tamaulipas

Cycling career
- Sport: Cycling
- Current team: Lotto–Intermarché Ladies
- Discipline: Road
- Role: Rider

Amateur team
- 2024: A.R. Monex Women's Pro Cycling Team

Professional teams
- 2023: ROXO Racing
- 2024: Boneshaker Project
- 2025–: Lotto Ladies

Romina Hinojosa (born 30 November 2002) is a Mexican professional road cyclist who rides for Lotto–Intermarché Ladies. In 2026 she became the first Mexican cyclist to ride the Tour de France Femmes.

== Career ==
As a child, Hinojosa trained to be a gymnast before focusing on cycling. She joined the professional team Lotto Ladies in 2025, after competing in the Tour de l'Avenir (the "Tour of the Future") for young riders. Hinojosa was initially just regarded by her team as a climber, but she has resisted the label, saying in an interview with Sporza that she is also interested in riding cobbled classics.

In the 2026 Tour de France Femmes, Hinojosa finished 113th in the general classification and 44th in the points classification. It is worth noting that of the seven cyclists on her team, Lotto–Intermarché Ladies, only three—Sandrine Tas, Linda Riedmann, and Romina—finished the race; the other four withdrew due to crashes or health issues.

== Personal life ==
Hinojosa is the partner of Mexican cyclist Isaac del Toro, who she met when they both rode the Tour de l'Avenir (which holds a men's and women's edition)

While competing in Europe, Hinojosa attends the University of Arizona virtually, studying for a degree in nutrition.

== Major results ==
2020
3rd Road race, National Junior Championships
2021
2nd Time trial, National Under-23 Championships
2022
2nd Road race, National Under-23 Championships
2023
2nd Time trial, National Championships (without official validity)
2nd Road race, National Championships (without official validity)
2025
2nd Road race, National Championships
