= 2016 Energiewacht Tour =

Race details
- Dates: 6–10 April
- Stages: 6 (including prologue + stage 4a and 4b)
- Distance: 466.8 km (290.1 mi)
- Winning time: 11h 45' 23"

Results
Jersey awarded to the overall winner	Winner	Ellen van Dijk (NED)	(Boels–Dolmans)
	Second	Annemiek van Vleuten (NED)	(Orica–AIS)
	Third	Lisa Brennauer (GER)	(Canyon//SRAM)
Jersey awarded to the points classification winner	Points	Lisa Brennauer (GER)	(Canyon//SRAM)
Jersey awarded to the youth classification winner	Youth	Floortje Mackaij (NED)	(Team Liv–Plantur)
Jersey awarded to the sprints classification winner	Sprints	Romy Kasper (GER)	(Boels–Dolmans)
	Team	Boels–Dolmans	

The 2016 Energiewacht Tour is the 6th edition of the Energiewacht Tour, a stage race held in the Netherlands, with a UCI rating of 2.2, from 6 April to 10 April.

== Stages ==
=== Stage 1 ===
6 April 2016 – Groningen, 11.3 km (7.0 mi) team time trial (TTT)

Stage 1 result

Rank	Team	Time
1	Boels–Dolmans	14' 09"
2	Canyon//SRAM	+ 20"
3	Orica–AIS	+ 21"
4	Rabobank-Liv Woman Cycling Team	+ 31"
5	Wiggle High5	+ 39"
6	Team Hitec Products	+ 50"
7	Parkhotel Valkenburg Continental Team	+ 57"
8	Great Britain national team	+ 1' 05"
9	Denmark national team	+ 1' 08"
10	Lensworld–Zannata	+ 1' 10"

General classification after stage 1
Rank	Rider	Team	Time
1	Ellen Van Dijk (NED)	Boels–Dolmans	13:39:00
2	Christine Majerus (LUX)	Boels–Dolmans	+ 0"
3	Chantal Blaak (NED)	Boels–Dolmans	+ 0"
4	Amalie Dideriksen (DEN)	Boels–Dolmans	+ 0"
5	Lisa Brennauer (GER)	Canyon//SRAM	+ 5"
6	Alexis Ryan (USA)	Canyon//SRAM	+ 5"
7	Alena Amialiusik (BLR)	Canyon//SRAM	+ 5"
8	Elena Cecchini (ITA)	Canyon//SRAM	+ 5"
9	Gracie Elvin (AUS)	Orica–AIS	+ 8"
10	Katrin Garfoot (AUS)	Orica–AIS	+ 8"

=== Stage 2 ===
7 April 2016 – Winsum, 116.8 km (72.6 mi)

Stage 2 result
Rank	Rider	Team	Time
1	Chantal Blaak (NED)	Boels–Dolmans	2:55:40
2	Lisa Brennauer (GER)	Canyon//SRAM	+ 0"
3	Ellen Van Dijk (NED)	Boels–Dolmans	+ 0"
4	Annemiek van Vleuten (NED)	Orica–AIS	+ 0"
5	Gracie Elvin (AUS)	Orica–AIS	+ 0"
6	Elena Cecchini (ITA)	Canyon//SRAM	+ 0"
7	Lucinda Brand (NED)	Rabobank-Liv Woman Cycling Team	+ 0"
8	Floortje Mackaij (NED)	Team Liv–Plantur	+ 0"
9	Amy Pieters (NED)	Wiggle High5	+ 5"
10	Romy Kasper (GER)	Boels–Dolmans	+ 5"

General classification after stage 2
Rank	Rider	Team	Time
1	Chantal Blaak (NED)	Boels–Dolmans	3:09:06
2	Ellen Van Dijk (NED)	Boels–Dolmans	+ 6"
3	Lisa Brennauer (GER)	Canyon//SRAM	+ 11"
4	Elena Cecchini (ITA)	Canyon//SRAM	+ 18"
5	Lucinda Brand (NED)	Rabobank-Liv Woman Cycling Team	+ 20"
6	Annemiek van Vleuten (NED)	Orica–AIS	+ 21"
7	Gracie Elvin (AUS)	Orica–AIS	+ 21"
8	Amy Pieters (NED)	Wiggle High5	+ 32"
9	Floortje Mackaij (NED)	Team Liv–Plantur	+ 37"
10	Roxane Knetemann (NED)	Rabobank-Liv Woman Cycling Team	+ 43"

=== Stage 3 ===
8 April 2016 – Stadskanaal to Musselkanaal, 131.8 km (81.9 mi)

Stage 3 result
Rank	Rider	Team	Time
1	Allie Dragoo (USA)	United States national team	3:20:53
2	Julie Leth (DEN)	Team Hitec Products	+ 2"
3	Gretchen Stumhofer (USA)	United States national team	+ 17"
4	Vera Koedooder (NED)	Parkhotel Valkenburg Continental Team	+ 17"
5	Moniek Tenniglo (NED)	Rabobank-Liv Woman Cycling Team	+ 17"
6	Sara Penton (SWE)	Lares–Waowdeals	+ 20"
7	Amy Pieters (NED)	Wiggle High5	+ 2'00"
8	Lisa Brennauer (GER)	Canyon//SRAM	+ 2'00"
9	Monique van de Ree (NED)	Lares–Waowdeals	+ 2'00"
10	Floortje Mackaij (NED)	Team Liv–Plantur	+ 2'00"

General classification after stage 3
Rank	Rider	Team	Time
1	Chantal Blaak (NED)	Boels–Dolmans	6:31:59
2	Ellen Van Dijk (NED)	Boels–Dolmans	+ 6"
3	Lisa Brennauer (GER)	Canyon//SRAM	+ 11"
4	Elena Cecchini (ITA)	Canyon//SRAM	+ 18"
5	Lucinda Brand (NED)	Rabobank-Liv Woman Cycling Team	+ 20"
6	Gracie Elvin (AUS)	Orica–AIS	+ 21"
7	Annemiek van Vleuten (NED)	Orica–AIS	+ 21"
8	Amy Pieters (NED)	Wiggle High5	+ 32"
9	Floortje Mackaij (NED)	Team Liv–Plantur	+ 37"
10	Roxane Knetemann (NED)	Rabobank-Liv Woman Cycling Team	+ 43"

=== Stage 4a ===
9 April 2016 – Zuidhorn, 75.4 km (46.9 mi)

Stage 4a result
Rank	Rider	Team	Time
1	Kirsten Wild (NED)	Team Hitec Products	1:54:31
2	Chantal Blaak (NED)	Boels–Dolmans	+ 0"
3	Barbara Guarischi (ITA)	Canyon//SRAM	+ 0"
4	Gracie Elvin (AUS)	Orica–AIS	+ 0"
5	Floortje Mackaij (NED)	Team Liv–Plantur	+ 0"
6	Ellen Van Dijk (NED)	Boels–Dolmans	+ 0"
7	Julia Soek (NED)	Team Liv–Plantur	+ 0"
8	Kelly Markus (NED)	Lares–Waowdeals	+ 0"
9	Christina Siggaard (DEN)	Danmark national team	+ 0"
10	Evy Kuijpers (NED)	GRC Jan van Arckel	+ 0"

General classification after stage 4a
Rank	Rider	Team	Time
1	Chantal Blaak (NED)	Boels–Dolmans	8:26:24
2	Ellen Van Dijk (NED)	Boels–Dolmans	+ 12"
3	Lisa Brennauer (GER)	Canyon//SRAM	+ 16"
4	Lucinda Brand (NED)	Rabobank-Liv Woman Cycling Team	+ 23"
5	Gracie Elvin (AUS)	Orica–AIS	+ 27"
6	Annemiek van Vleuten (NED)	Orica–AIS	+ 27"
7	Elena Cecchini (ITA)	Canyon//SRAM	+ 28"
8	Amy Pieters (NED)	Wiggle High5	+ 42"
9	Floortje Mackaij (NED)	Team Liv–Plantur	+ 43"
10	Barbara Guarischi (ITA)	Canyon//SRAM	+ 53"

=== Stage 4b ===
9 April 2016 – Leek (individual time trial), 13.6 km (8.5 mi)

Stage 4a result
Rank	Rider	Team	Time
1	Ellen Van Dijk (NED)	Boels–Dolmans	17:44
2	Annemiek van Vleuten (NED)	Orica–AIS	+ 22"
3	Lisa Brennauer (GER)	Canyon//SRAM	+ 48"
4	Tayler Wiles (USA)	Orica–AIS	+ 57"
5	Katrin Garfoot (AUS)	Orica–AIS	+ 59"
6	Roxane Knetemann (NED)	Rabobank-Liv Woman Cycling Team	+ 1'01"
7	Allie Dragoo (USA)	United States national team	+ 1'02"
8	Amy Pieters (NED)	Wiggle High5	+ 1'04"
9	Linda Villumsen (NZL)	UnitedHealthcare	+ 1'04"
10	Elena Cecchini (ITA)	Canyon//SRAM	+ 1'05"

General classification after stage 4a
Rank	Rider	Team	Time
1	Ellen Van Dijk (NED)	Boels–Dolmans	8:44:20
2	Annemiek van Vleuten (NED)	Orica–AIS	+ 37"
3	Lisa Brennauer (GER)	Canyon//SRAM	+ 52"
4	Chantal Blaak (NED)	Boels–Dolmans	+ 57"
5	Elena Cecchini (ITA)	Canyon//SRAM	+ 1'21"
6	Amy Pieters (NED)	Wiggle High5	+ 1'34"
7	Lucinda Brand (NED)	Rabobank-Liv Woman Cycling Team	+ 1'38"
8	Gracie Elvin (AUS)	Orica–AIS	+ 1'38"
9	Roxane Knetemann (NED)	Rabobank-Liv Woman Cycling Team	+ 1'42"
10	Floortje Mackaij (NED)	Team Liv–Plantur	+ 2'06"

=== Stage 5 ===
10 April 2016 – Borkum, 117.9 km (73.3 mi)

Stage 4a result
Rank	Rider	Team	Time
1	Kirsten Wild (NED)	Team Hitec Products	3:01:03
2	Lisa Brennauer (GER)	Canyon//SRAM	+ 0"
3	Christine Majerus (LUX)	Boels–Dolmans	+ 0"
4	Maria Giulia Confalonieri (ITA)	Lensworld–Zannata	+ 0"
5	Lucinda Brand (NED)	Rabobank-Liv Woman Cycling Team	+ 0"
6	Monique van de Ree (NED)	Lares–Waowdeals	+ 0"
7	Kaat van der Meulen (BEL)	Lensworld–Zannata	+ 0"
8	Kelly Markus (NED)	Lares–Waowdeals	+ 0"
9	Ellen Van Dijk (NED)	Boels–Dolmans	+ 0"
10	Amy Pieters (NED)	Wiggle High5	+ 0"

General classification after stage 4a
Rank	Rider	Team	Time
1	Ellen Van Dijk (NED)	Boels–Dolmans	8:44:20
2	Annemiek van Vleuten (NED)	Orica–AIS	+ 36"
3	Lisa Brennauer (GER)	Canyon//SRAM	+ 37"
4	Elena Cecchini (ITA)	Canyon//SRAM	+ 1'19"
5	Amy Pieters (NED)	Wiggle High5	+ 1'34"
6	Lucinda Brand (NED)	Rabobank-Liv Woman Cycling Team	+ 1'38"
7	Gracie Elvin (AUS)	Orica–AIS	+ 1'38"
8	Roxane Knetemann (NED)	Rabobank-Liv Woman Cycling Team	+ 1'42"
9	Floortje Mackaij (NED)	Team Liv–Plantur	+ 2'06"
10	Romy Kasper (NED)	Boels–Dolmans	+ 2'30"

== Classification leadership table ==
denotes the rider with the lowest accumulated time and is the overall race leader
denotes the leader of the Points classification
denotes the leader of the Sprint classification
denotes the leader of the Combativity classification
denotes rider with the lowest accumulated time, who is under a specified age and leader of the Youth classification
denotes the leader of the Club rider classification, which consists of the rider with the best overall time from a non-UCI Women's team

Classification leadership by stage
Stage	Winner	General classification	Points classification	Sprint classification	Young rider classification	Combativity classification	Best Club rider classification	Team classification
1	Boels–Dolmans	Ellen van Dijk			Amalie Dideriksen			Boels–Dolmans
2	Chantal Blaak	Chantal Blaak	Chantal Blaak		Floortje Mackaij			Boels–Dolmans
3	Allie Dragoo	Chantal Blaak	Lisa Brennauer		Floortje Mackaij			Boels–Dolmans
4a	Kirsten Wild	Chantal Blaak	Chantal Blaak		Floortje Mackaij			Boels–Dolmans
4b	Ellen van Dijk	Ellen van Dijk	Ellen van Dijk		Floortje Mackaij			Boels–Dolmans
5	Kirsten Wild	Ellen van Dijk	Lisa Brennauer		Floortje Mackaij			Boels–Dolmans
Final		Ellen van Dijk	Lisa Brennauer		Floortje Mackaij			Boels–Dolmans

== See also ==
- 2016 in women's road cycling
