= Joëlle Numainville =

Canadian road bicycle racer (born 1987)

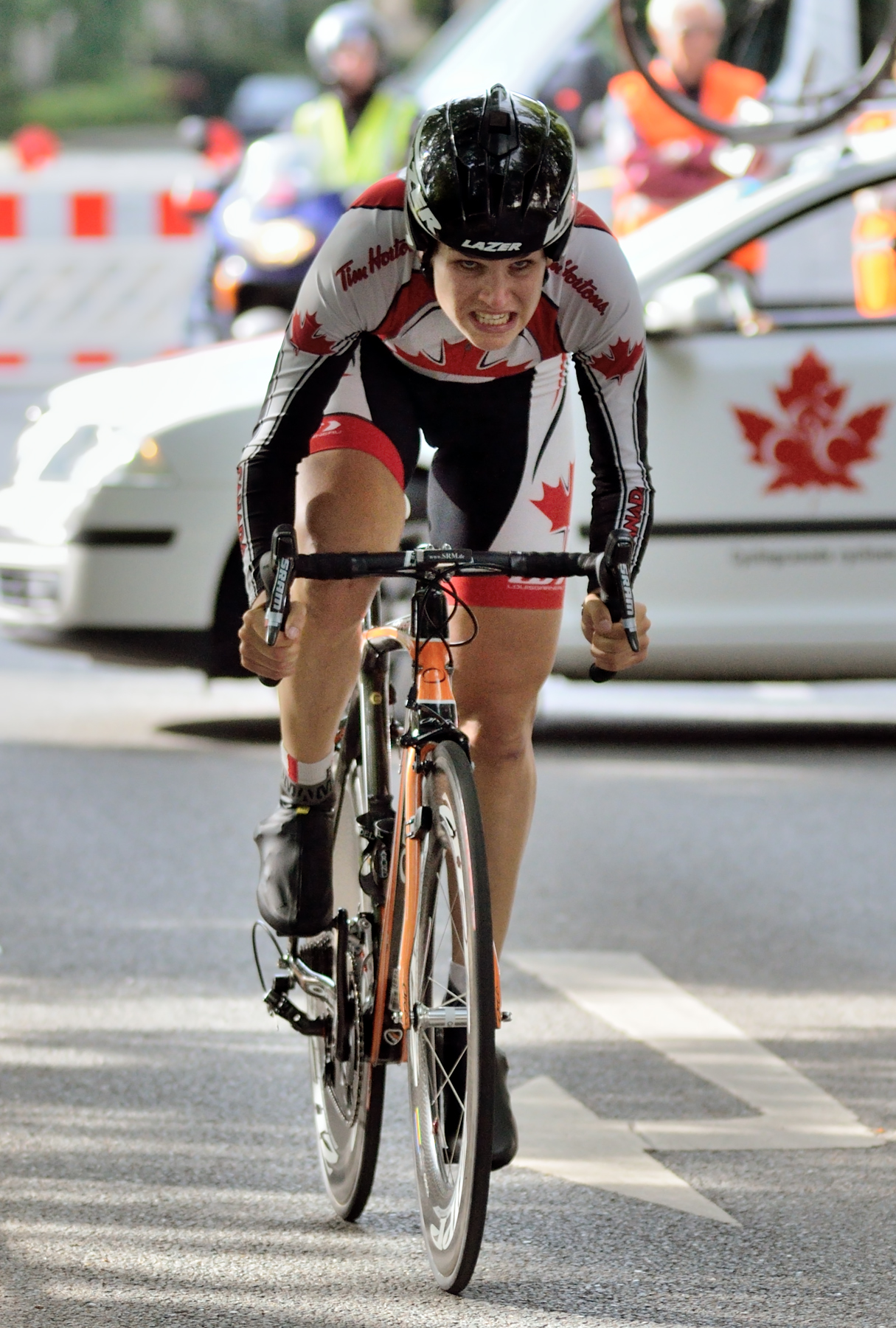
- Numainville at the 2012 Thüringen Rundfahrt der Frauen

Personal information
- Born: November 20, 1987 (age 38) Montreal, Quebec

Cycling career
- Sport: Cycling
- Current team: Retired
- Discipline: Road
- Role: Rider
- Rider type: Classics specialist

Professional teams
- 2007: Team Expresscopy.com
- 2008–2009: ESGL 93-GSD Gestion
- 2010: Webcor Builders Cycling Team
- 2011: Team TIBCO–To The Top
- 2012–2014: Optum–Kelly Benefit Strategies
- 2014: Lotto–Belisol Ladies
- 2015–2016: Bigla Pro Cycling Team
- 2017–2018: Cylance Pro Cycling
Medal record
Women's road bicycle racing
Representing Canada
Pan American Championships
Gold medal – first place	2009 Hidalgo	Road race
Silver medal – second place	2010 Aguascalientes	Road race
Representing Cervélo–Bigla Pro Cycling
World Championships
Bronze medal – third place	2016 Doha	Team time trial

Joëlle Numainville (born November 20, 1987) is a Canadian former road bicycle racer.

== Career ==
She competed at the 2012 Summer Olympics in the women's road race, finishing 12th. Numainville left Optum–Kelly Benefit Strategies for Belgium-based Lotto–Belisol Ladies in August 2014, replacing Briton Emma Pooley who retired from cycling. The Bigla Pro Cycling Team announced that Numainville would join them for the 2015 season. Numainville retired in 2018 due to phlebitis, and moved into the financial sector.

== Major results ==
2008
2nd Road race, National Under-23 Road Championships
2009
1st Road race, Pan American Road Championships
National Under-23 Road Championships

1st Road race
3rd Time trial

Tucson Bicycle Classic

1st Stages 2 & 3

5th Overall Trophée d'Or Féminin

1st Stage 5

2010
1st Road race, National Road Championships
1st Grand Prix Cycliste de Gatineau
2nd Road race, Pan American Road Championships
6th Road race, Commonwealth Games
6th Liberty Classic
2011
1st Clarendon Cup
2nd Grand Prix Cycliste de Gatineau
4th Road race, Pan American Road Championships
4th Liberty Classic
5th Road race, National Road Championships
6th Road race, Pan American Games
6th Overall Holland Ladies Tour
6th Tour of Flanders for Women
8th GP de Plouay – Bretagne
2012
1st Stage 4 Tour Cycliste Féminin International de l'Ardèche
National Road Championships

3rd Road race
5th Time trial

3rd Overall San Dimas Stage Race
3rd Tour of Flanders for Women
4th Grand Prix Cycliste de Gatineau
5th Liberty Classic
2013
National Road Championships

1st Road race
1st Time trial

2nd Grand Prix cycliste de Gatineau
2nd Chrono Gatineau
2nd Philadelphia Cycling Classic
5th Overall Tour Cycliste Féminin International de l'Ardèche

1st Stage 4

6th Road race, Jeux de la Francophonie
2014
2nd Winston-Salem Cycling Classic
6th Overall Trophée d'Or Féminin
2015
1st Road race, National Road Championships
2nd Grand Prix cycliste de Gatineau
5th Winston-Salem Cycling Classic
6th Overall Thüringen Rundfahrt der Frauen
2016
1st White Spot / Delta Road Race
National Road Championships

2nd Road race
3rd Time trial

2nd Grand Prix Cycliste de Gatineau
2nd Crescent Vårgårda UCI Women's WorldTour TTT
UCI Road World Championships

3rd Team time trial
9th Road race

3rd GP de Plouay – Bretagne
4th La Course by Le Tour de France
5th Chrono Gatineau
6th RideLondon Grand Prix
7th Gran Premio Bruno Beghelli Internazionale Donne Elite
2017
4th Grand Prix Cycliste de Gatineau
7th White Spot / Delta Road Race
