= Erica Clevenger =

American cyclist

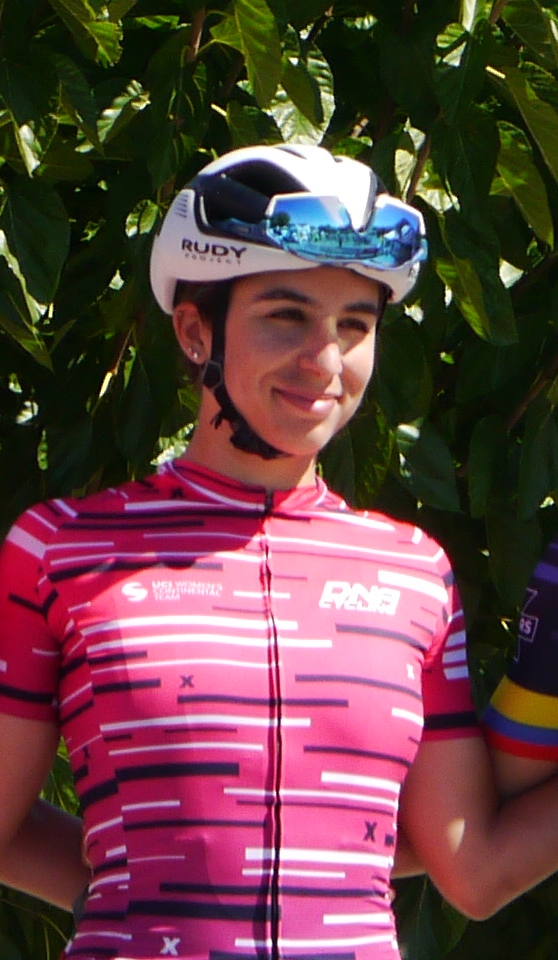
- Erica Clevenger (2022)

Personal information
- Full name: Erica Clevenger
- Born: May 1, 1994 (age 32)

Cycling career
- Sport: Cycling
- Current team: DNA Pro Cycling
- Discipline: Road
- Role: Rider

Professional teams
- 2018–2019: Twenty20 p/b Sho-Air
- 2020: Tibco–Silicon Valley Bank
- 2021–: DNA Pro Cycling

Erica Clevenger (born May 1, 1994) is an American professional racing cyclist, who currently rides for UCI Women's Continental Team DNA Pro Cycling.

== Major results ==
2021
8th Overall Joe Martin Stage Race
2022
6th Overall Joe Martin Stage Race
