= Lenore Pipes =

Guamanian cyclist

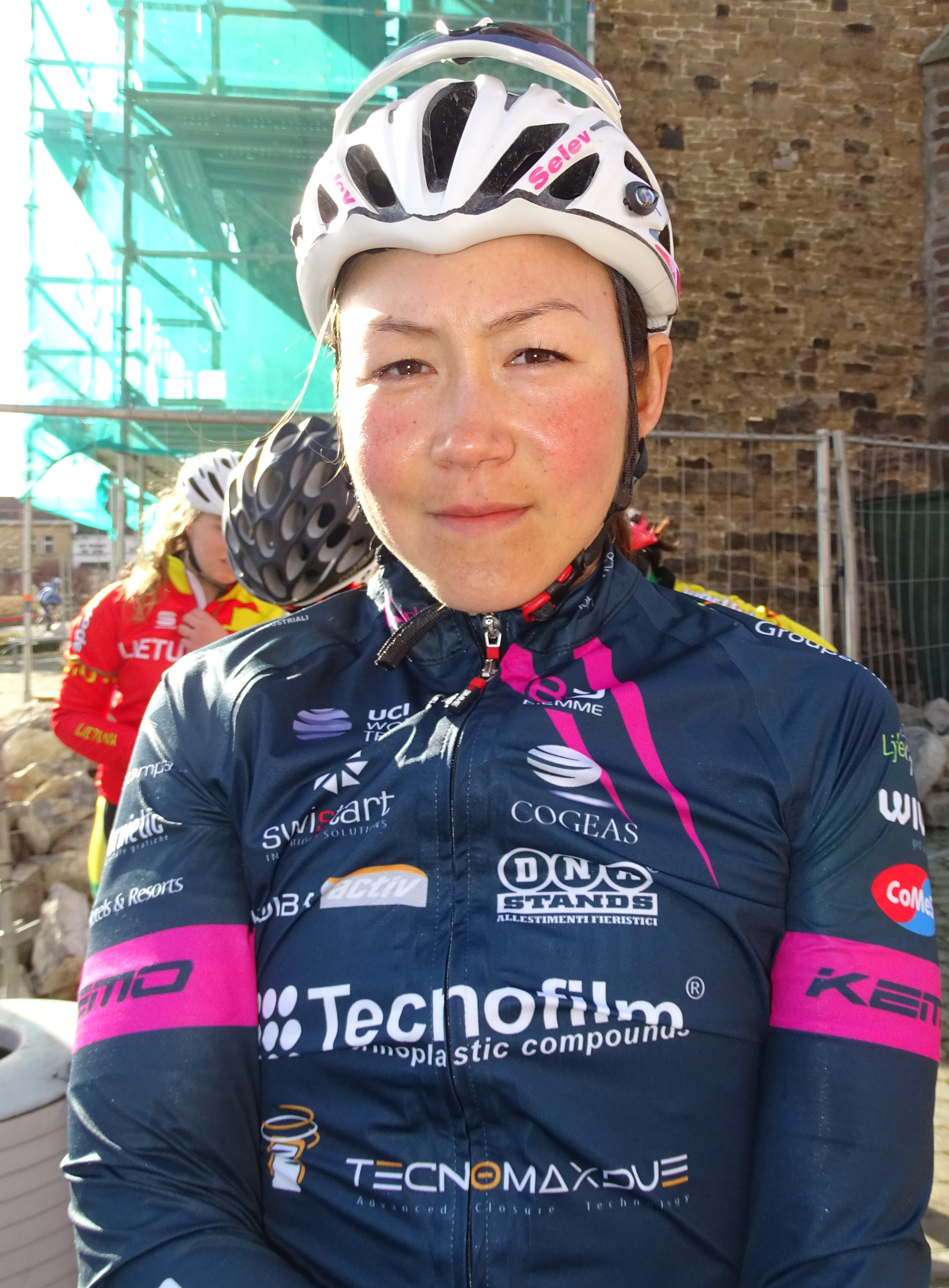
- Pipes in 2016

Personal information
- Born: 1 November 1985 (age 40) Hagåtña, Guam

Cycling career
- Sport: Cycling
- Current team: Retired
- Discipline: Road
- Role: Rider

Amateur teams
- 2013: Care4Cycling p/b Solomon
- 2014: Colavita–Fine Cooking
- 2014: Cloud Racing p/b Ride 2 Recovery (guest)
- 2015: Van Dessel Factory Team
- 2015: Colavita–Fine Cooking (guest)
- 2015: Team TIBCO–SVB (guest)

Professional team
- 2015–2016: BePink–La Classica

Lenore Pipes (born 1 November 1985) is a Guamanian former road cyclist. She participated at the 2012 UCI Road World Championships.

== Personal life ==
Pipes completed her undergraduate degree in biology and anthropology from Swarthmore College. She then went on to pursue a Ph.D. in computational biology at Cornell University, and is a postdoctoral research fellow at University of California, Berkeley.

== Major results ==
2012
9th Liberty Classic
2013
6th Grand Prix cycliste de Gatineau
2014
7th Overall Armed Forces Association Cycling Classic
10th Mildred Kugler Women's Open
10th Winston-Salem Criterium
2015
1st Tour of the Battenkill
3rd Road race, National Collegiate Road Championships
5th Mildred Kugler Women's Open
6th Overall Armed Forces Association Cycling Classic
7th White Spot / Delta Road Race
8th Grand Prix cycliste de Gatineau
