= Nadia Gontova =

Canadian cyclist (born 2000)

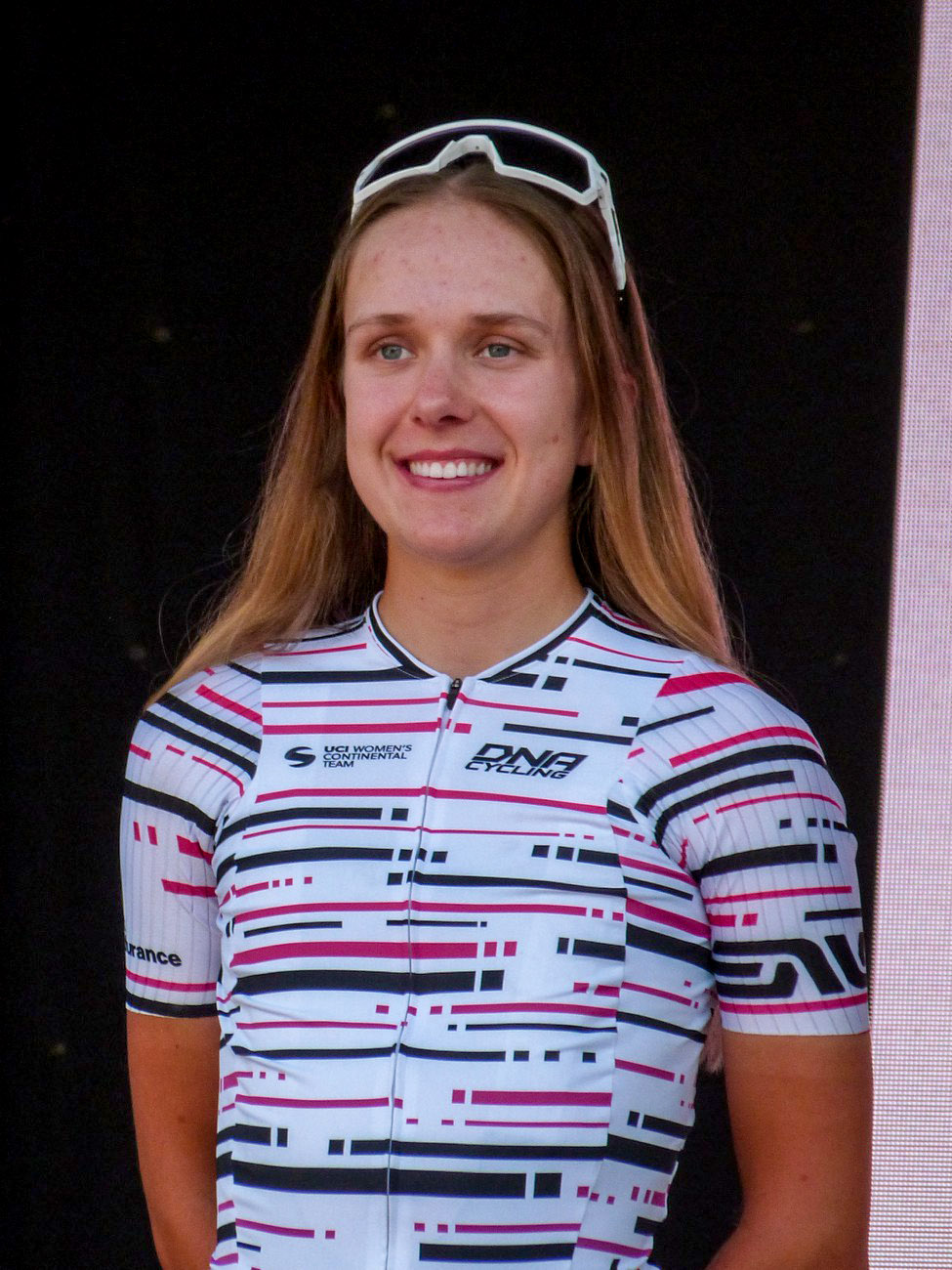
- Gontova in 2024

Personal information
- Born: 7 August 2000 (age 26) Richmond, British Columbia

Cycling career
- Sport: Cycling
- Current team: Liv AlUla Jayco
- Discipline: Road
- Role: Climber

Professional teams
- 2023: ROXO Racing
- 2024: DNA Pro Cycling
- 2025: Winspace Orange Seal
- 2026–: Liv AlUla Jayco

Major wins
- One-day races and Classics National Time Trial Championships (2026)

Nadia Gontova (born 7 August 2000) is a Canadian professional cyclist who rides for Liv AlUla Jayco. She is the 2026 Canadian time trial champion.

== Career ==
Gontova started cycling during the COVID-19 pandemic. After riding for American continental teams ROXO Racing and DNA Pro Cycling, Gontova broke out with an overall win at the Redlands Bicycle Classic.

Gontova rode in the 2025 Tour de France Femmes with team Winspace Orange Seal, finishing tenth on the final stage and 23rd overall, which helped her secure a contract with UCI Women's World Tour team Liv AlUla Jayco for the following season.

Gontova was initially selected to represent Canada at the 2025 UCI Road World Championships, but missed the event due to iliac artery surgery.

== Major results ==
2023
National Championships

8th Road race
8th Time trial

2024
1st Overall Redlands Bicycle Classic

1st Stage 2

2nd Chrono Gatineau
National Championships

5th Road race
6th Time trial

8th Overall Tour Cycliste Féminin International de l'Ardèche
2025
2nd Overall Tour Féminin International des Pyrénées
National Championships

3rd Time trial
6th Road race

3rd Alpes Gresivaudan Classic
2026
1st Time trial, National Championships
9th Overall Vuelta a Burgos
