= Annie Ewart =

Canadian cyclist (born 1993)

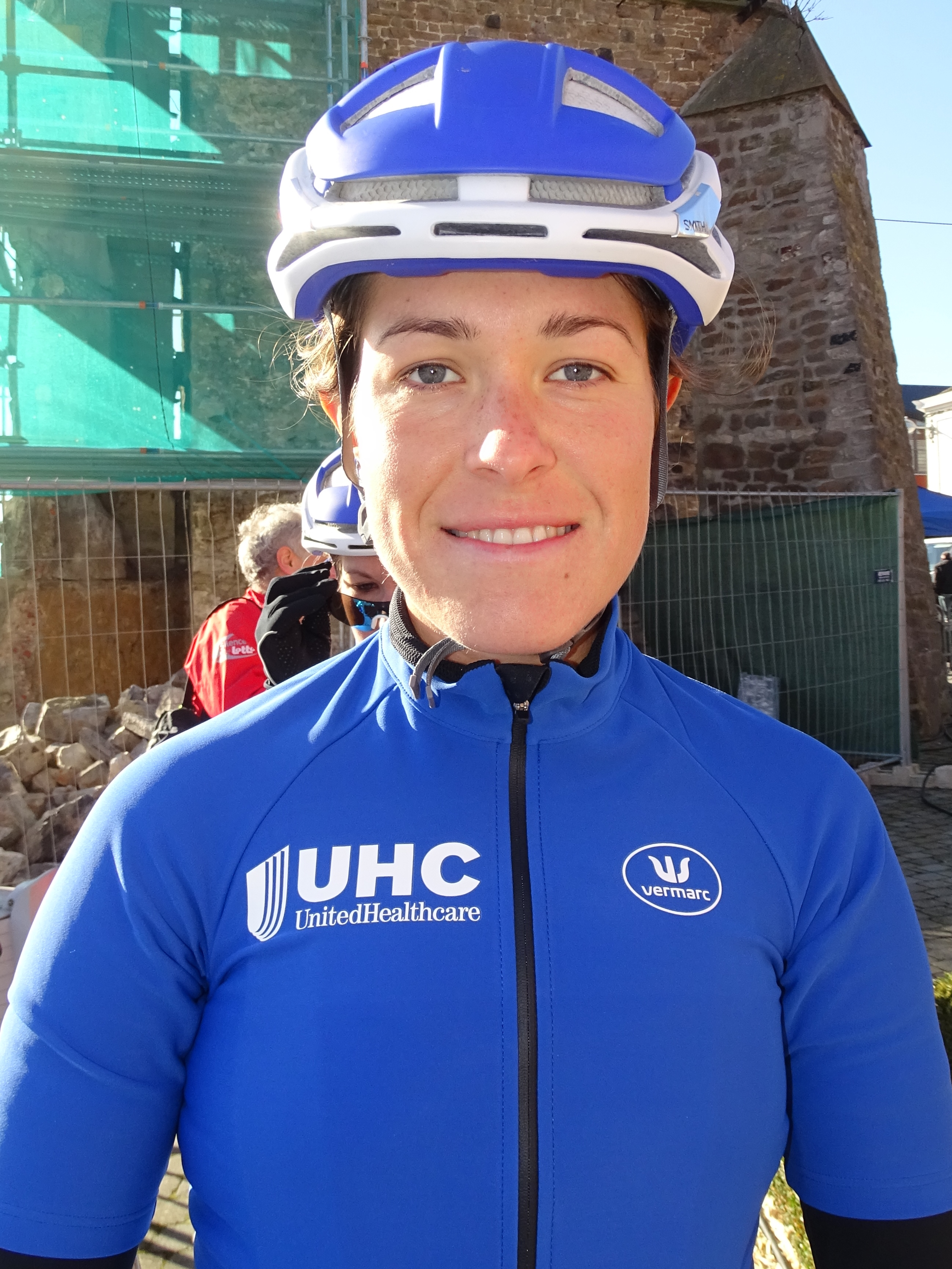
- Ewart in 2016

Personal information
- Born: 29 September 1993 (age 33) Victoria, British Columbia, Canada
- Height: 5 ft 6 in (168 cm)
- Weight: 127 lb (58 kg)

Cycling career
- Sport: Cycling
- Current team: Retired
- Discipline: Road
- Role: Rider
- Rider type: All-rounder

Professional teams
- 2012–2015: Optum Pro Cycling
- 2016: UnitedHealthcare

Annie Ewart (born 29 September 1993) is a Canadian former racing cyclist. She rode at the 2014 UCI Road World Championships.

== Major results ==
2013
4th Time trial, Pan American Road Championships
2014
8th Chrono Gatineau
2015
1st Stage 2 Tour of the Gila
