= 2014 Chrono Gatineau =

Race details
- Dates: 6 June 2014
- Stages: 1
- Distance: 11.5 km (7.146 mi)
- Winning time: 15' 51"

Results
	Winner	Tayler Wiles (USA)	(Specialized–lululemon)
	Second	Leah Kirchmann (CAN)	(Canada national team)
	Third	Jasmin Glaesser (CAN)	(Team TIBCO - To The Top)

The 2014 Chrono Gatineau is a one-day women's cycle race held in Canada on 6 June 2014. The race had a UCI rating of 1.1.

== Results ==
	Rider	Team	Time
1	Tayler Wiles (USA)	Specialized–lululemon	15' 51"
2	Leah Kirchmann (CAN)	Canada national team	+ 20"
3	Jasmin Glaesser (CAN)	Team TIBCO - To The Top	+ 25"
4	Jade Wilcoxson (USA)	Optum–Kelly Benefit Strategies	+ 33"
5	Annie Foreman Mackey (CAN)	Stevens - The Cyclery Can	+ 38"
6	Lauren Hall (USA)	Optum–Kelly Benefit Strategies	+ 47"
7	Anika Todd (CAN)	Team TIBCO - To The Top	+ 50"
8	Annie Ewart (CAN)	Canada national team	+ 51"
9	Ellen Watters (CAN)	Stevens - The Cyclery Can	+ 56"
10	Alizée Brien (CAN)	Team TIBCO - To The Top	+ 57"

== See also ==
- 2014 in women's road cycling
