= Ellen Skerritt =

Australian cyclist

- Born: Ellen Skerritt; 20 December 1994 (age 31)
- Occupations: Former professional cyclist; Lieutenant, Australian Army
- Cycling career
- Sport: Cycling
- Current team: Retired
- Discipline: Road
- Role: Rider

Amateur teams
- 2012: Lifecycle Cycling Team
- 2013: Team Bikebug
- 2014: Holden Women's Cycling Team
- 2015: High5 Dream Team
- 2017: Total Rush

Professional team
- 2016: Alé–Cipollini
- Military career
- Allegiance: Australia
- Branch: Australian Army
- Service years: 2019–present
- Rank: Lieutenant
- Unit: Royal Australian Corps of Signals

Ellen Skerritt (born 20 December 1994) is an Australian military officer and former professional racing cyclist. After ending her cycling career, Skerritt became a Lieutenant in the Australian Army in 2019.

== Major results ==
2015
1st Young rider classification Women's Tour of New Zealand
National Under-23 Road Championships

2nd Time trial
3rd Road race

Oceania Road Cycling Championships

4th Under-23 time trial
5th Under-23 road race
9th Time trial

8th Cadel Evans Great Ocean Road Race
2016
National Under-23 Road Championships

2nd Time trial
3rd Road race

== See also ==
- List of 2016 UCI Women's Teams and riders
