= Colavita =

Italian food company

Colavita S.p.A.
- Company type: Private
- Industry: Food processing
- Founded: 1938; 88 years ago
- Founder: Giovanni and Felice Colavita
- Headquarters: Pomezia, Rome, Italy
- Area served: Italy, United States
- Key people: Enrico and Leonardo Colavita
- Products: Pasta, Olive Oil, Tomato Sauce, Soup, Vinegar, Wine
- Website: colavita.it colavita.com

Colavita S.p.A is an Italian company best known for its olive oil.

As of 2010, the brothers Enrico and Leonardo Colavita run the company, with Enrico serving as President and Leonardo as General Manager, and other members of the family serving in other management roles, including Leonardo's son Giovanni, who was President of Colavita USA. Their father started the packaging business in the 1930s; their family, and many other families in the town of Sant'Elia a Pianisi and the wider Province of Campobasso, had grown and pressed olive oil for generations. The company owns a packaging plant in Pomezia, which also packages olive oil under the brands Rachael Ray All-Italian Extra Virgin Olive Oil and Santa Sabina.

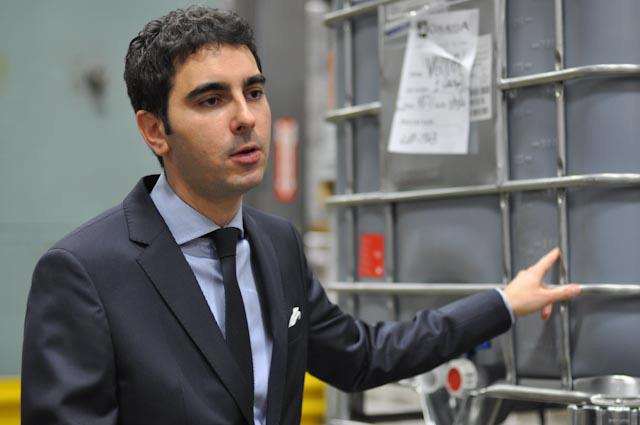
Giovanni Colavita, CEO of Colavita USA

Colavita USA was founded by John J. Profaci exclusively who, at the time, was a resident of Bensonhurst, Brooklyn. Profaci was introduced to Enrico Colavita in 1978 after Colavita came to the United States. Profaci, who had been in the olive oil business, agreed to go into business with Colavita as the US distributor for the company and subsequently created the extra virgin olive oil category in the United States. The US distribution started slowly, with Profaci offering samples at a local grocery store, and then he started to sell to Italian restaurants and to specialty stores and within five years, Colavita became a renowned brand in parts of the world. Then, in the mid-1980s, The New York Times ran a feature on the health benefits of foods with monounsaturated fat like olive oil, and the article included a picture of a bottle of Colavita olive oil. The publicity caused the business to grow quickly.

In 1991 Colavita USA donated $2 million to the Culinary Institute of America in exchange for naming rights to a new building on the campus; the building opened in 2001 after the school spent $7 million total to complete it.

In 2008 Colavita acquired Colavita USA.

== See also ==
- Colavita/Bianchi, a women's cycling team sponsored by the company
