= 2015 Grand Prix cycliste de Gatineau =

Race details
- Dates: 4 June 2015
- Distance: 107.6 km (66.86 mi)
- Winning time: 2h 45' 14"

Results
	Winner	Kirsten Wild (NED)	(Team Hitec Products)
	Second	Joëlle Numainville (CAN)	(Canada (national team))
	Third	Christine Majerus (LUX)	(Luxembourg (national team))

The 2015 Grand Prix cycliste de Gatineau was held on 4 June 2015, in Gatineau, Canada. A 107.6-kilometre (66.9 mi) women's road cycling race, it was won by Kirsten Wild (Team Hitec Products), who beat Joëlle Numainville (Canada) and Christine Majerus (Luxembourg).

== Results ==
Result
Rank	Rider	Team	Time
1	Kirsten Wild (NED)	Team Hitec Products	2h 45' 14"
2	Joëlle Numainville (CAN)	Canada (national team)	+ 0"
3	Christine Majerus (LUX)	Luxembourg (national team)	+ 0"
4	Tiffany Cromwell (AUS)	Velocio–SRAM	+ 0"
5	Emily Collins (NZL)	Team TIBCO–SVB	+ 0"
6	Leah Kirchmann (CAN)	Optum–KBS	+ 0"
7	Kendall Ryan (USA)	Team TIBCO–SVB	+ 0"
8	Lenore Pipes (GUM)	West Quebec Wheelers	+ 0"
9	Heather Fischer (USA)	Visit Dallas Cycling	+ 0"
10	Alison Jackson (CAN)	Canada (national team)	+ 0"
