= Claire Rose =

British cyclist

Personal information
- Full name: Claire Rose Galloway
- Born: 23 May 1987 (age 39)

Cycling career
- Sport: Cycling
- Discipline: Road
- Role: Rider

Amateur team
- 2013–2015: Breast Cancer Care Cycling Team

Professional teams
- 2016: Podium Ambition Pro Cycling
- 2017: Visit Dallas DNA Pro Cycling
- 2018: Cervélo–Bigla Pro Cycling

Claire Rose (born 23 May 1987) is a British professional racing cyclist, who last rode for UCI Women's Team Cervélo–Bigla Pro Cycling.

== Major results ==
2016
1st Round 3, Matrix Fitness Grand Prix Series – Stoke-on-Trent
2nd Time trial, National Road Championships
3rd Overall Tour de Bretagne Féminin (2.2) – France
3rd Ljubljana-Domzale-Ljubljana TT (1.2) – Slovenia

2017
1st Time trial, National Road Championships
Cascade Cycling Classic (2.2) – USA

1st Stages 2 (ITT) & 4

3rd Overall Joe Martin Stage Race (2.2) – USA
Redlands Classic – USA

1st Sprints classification
1st Stage 4

== See also ==
- List of 2016 UCI Women's Teams and riders
