= Lauren Hall =

American cyclist

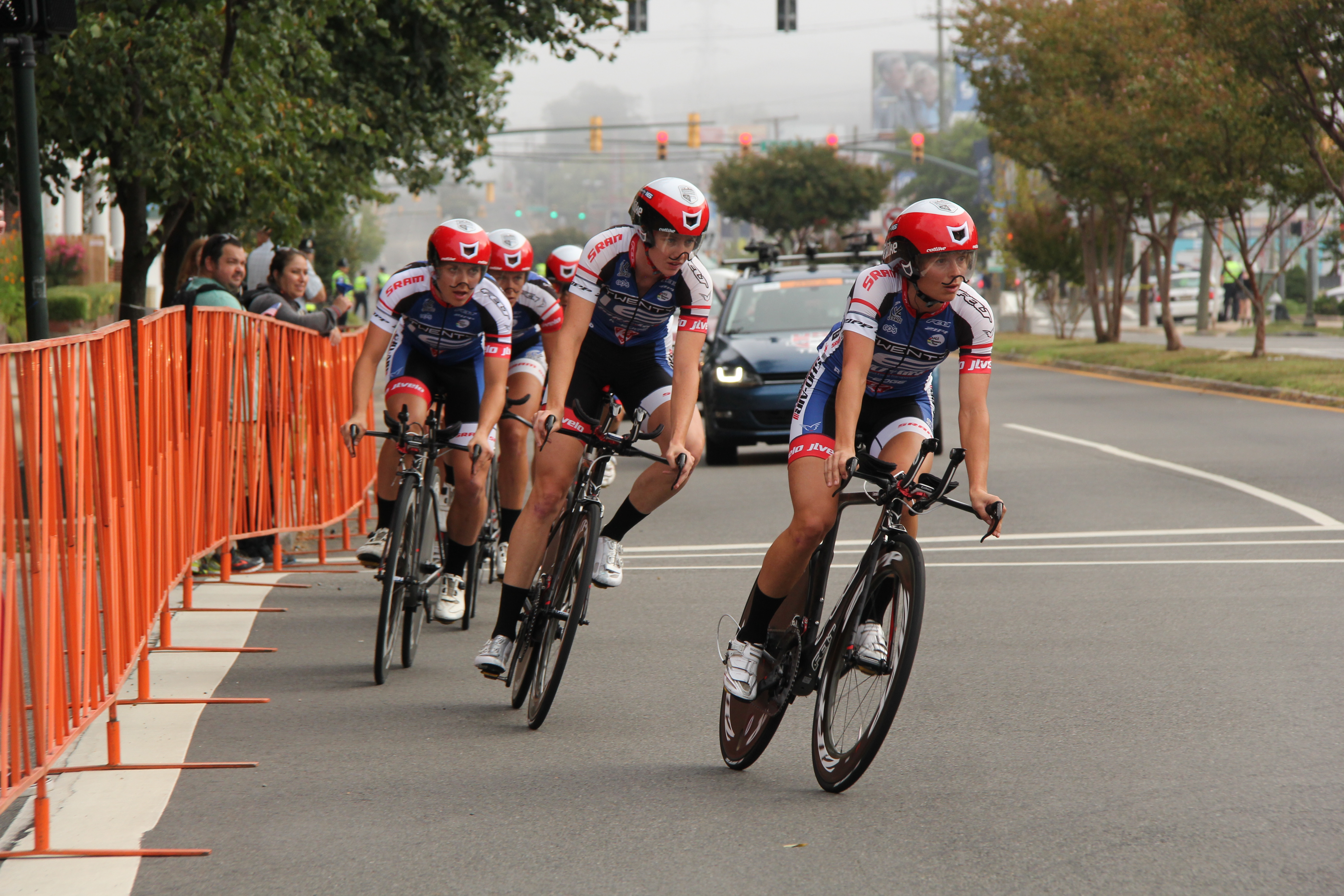
- Riding with Twenty16 p/b Sho-Air at the 2015 UCI Road World Championships

Personal information
- Born: February 2, 1979 (age 47) Vicksburg, Mississippi, United States

Cycling career
- Sport: Cycling
- Current team: Retired
- Discipline: Road
- Role: Rider

Amateur teams
- 2009: ValueAct Capital
- 2010: Vera Bradley Foundation

Professional teams
- 2011: Colavita Forno d'Asolo
- 2012: Team TIBCO–To The Top
- 2013–2014: Optum–Kelly Benefit Strategies
- 2015: Twenty16 p/b Sho-Air
- 2016: Tibco–Silicon Valley Bank
- 2017–2018: UnitedHealthcare

Lauren Hall (born February 2, 1979) is an American former racing cyclist. She competed in the 2013 UCI women's team time trial in Florence.

== Major results ==
2010
2nd Menlo Park Grand Prix
9th Sea Otter Classic Criterium Race

2011
1st Dilworth Criterium
1st Stage 3 Tour de Toona
1st Stage 4 Cascade Cycling Classic
6th Overall Air Force Cycling Classic
7th Beaufort Memorial Classic
7th Sandy Springs Cycling Challenge
8th Overall Aspen Snowmass Pro Race

2012
National Road Championships

2nd Road race
2nd Criterium

2nd Overall Premondiale Giro Toscana Int. Femminile – Memorial Michela Fanini
4th Herman Miller Grand Cycling Classic
5th Exergy Twilight Criterium

2013
1st Stage 4 Tour of the Gila
1st Stage 4 Cascade Cycling Classic
National Road Championships

2nd Road race
4th Criterium

4th Overall Merco Classic
4th Old Pueblo Grand Prix
4th Grand Prix Cycliste de Gatineau
5th Chrono Gatineau
8th Team time trial, UCI Road World Championships
9th Overall North Star Grand Prix

1st Stage 2

2014
1st Gent–Wevelgem
3rd Philadelphia Cycling Classic
4th Team time trial, UCI Road World Championships
National Road Championships

6th Road race
10th Time trial

6th Chrono Gatineau
9th Overall The Women's Tour

2015
1st Stage 3 Holland Ladies Tour
1st Stage 4 Cascade Cycling Classic
2nd Andersen Banducci Twilight Criterium
5th Team time trial, UCI Road World Championships
5th Overall Women's Tour of New Zealand

1st Stages 1 (TTT), 2 & 5

7th Overall Valley of the Sun

1st Stage 3

10th Overall Tour of Colorado

2016
3rd Overall Green Mountain
5th Road race, National Road Championships
6th Thompson Criterium of Doylestown
8th Gran Prix San Luis Femenino

2017
1st Sunny King Criterium
3rd Overall The Gateway Cup

1st Stage 1

2018
1st Grand Prix Cycliste de Gatineau
1st Stage 2 Valley of the Sun
