= 2014 Winston-Salem Cycling Classic =

Race details
- Dates: April 18, 2014
- Stages: 1
- Distance: 91 km (56.54 mi)
- Winning time: 2h 27' 50"

Results
	Winner	Shelley Olds (USA)	(Alé–Cipollini)
	Second	Joëlle Numainville (CAN)	(Optum–Kelly Benefit Strategies)
	Third	Eugenia Bujak (POL)	(BTC City Ljubljana)

The 2014 Winston-Salem Cycling Classic was a one-day women's cycle race held in Winston-Salem, North Carolina, on April 18, 2014. The race had an UCI rating of 1.2.

== Results ==
	Rider	Team	Time
1	Shelley Olds (USA)	Alé–Cipollini	2h 27' 50"
2	Joëlle Numainville (CAN)	Optum–Kelly Benefit Strategies	s.t.
3	Eugenia Bujak (POL)	BTC City Ljubljana	s.t.
4	Erica Allar (USA)	Colavita — Fine Cooking	s.t.
5	Elena Cecchini (ITA)	Estado de México–Faren Kuota	s.t.
6	Lex Albrecht (CAN)	Exergy Twenty16	s.t.
7	Jessica Cutler (USA)	FCS Cycling Team	s.t.
8	Lauren Stephens (USA)	Team TIBCO	s.t.
9	Hannah Barnes (GBR)	UnitedHealthcare Pro Cycling	s.t.
10	Denise Ramsden (CAN)	Optum–Kelly Benefit Strategies	s.t.

== See also ==
- 2014 in women's road cycling
