= 2015 Chrono Gatineau =

Race details
- Dates: 5 June 2015
- Distance: 11.5 km (7.146 mi)
- Winning time: 15' 36"

Results
	Winner	Carmen Small (USA)	(Twenty16 p/b Sho-Air)
	Second	Karol-Ann Canuel (CAN)	(Velocio–SRAM)
	Third	Tayler Wiles (USA)	(Velocio–SRAM)

The 2015 Chrono de Gatineau was held on 5 June 2015, in Gatineau, Canada. An 11.5-kilometre (7.1-mile) individual time trial cycle race for women, it was won by Carmen Small (Twenty16 p/b Sho-Air), who beat Karol-Ann Canuel (Velocio–SRAM) and Tayler Wiles (Velocio–SRAM).

== Results ==
Result
Rank	Rider	Team	Time
1	Carmen Small (USA)	Twenty16 p/b Sho-Air	15' 36"
2	Karol-Ann Canuel (CAN)	Velocio–SRAM	+ 8"
3	Tayler Wiles (USA)	Velocio–SRAM	+ 8"
4	Hanna Solovey (UKR)	Ukraine (national team)	+ 12"
5	Lauren Stephens (USA)	Team TIBCO–SVB	+ 13"
6	Alena Amialiusik (BLR)	Velocio–SRAM	+ 15"
7	Amber Neben (USA)	Visit Dallas Cycling	+ 17"
8	Tara Whitten (CAN)	The Cyclery–Opus	+ 23"
9	Brianna Walle (USA)	Optum–KBS	+ 24"
10	Jasmin Glaesser (CAN)	Optum–KBS	+ 31"
