= Ellen Noble =

American cyclist

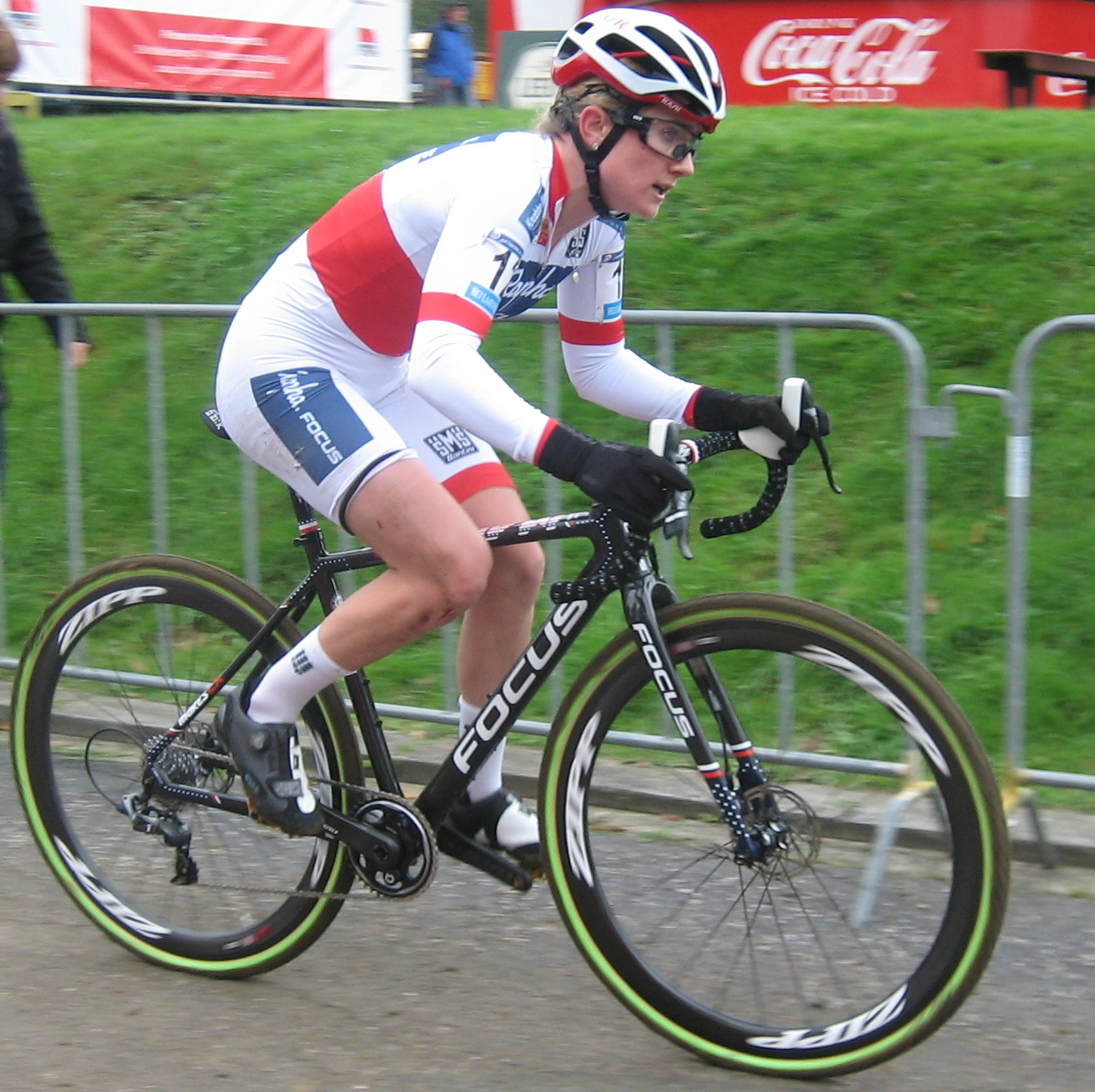
- Noble in 2016

Personal information
- Full name: Ellen Rose Noble
- Born: December 3, 1995 (age 30) Kennebunkport, Maine, United States

Cycling career
- Sport: Cycling
- Current team: Trek Factory Racing
- Disciplines: Cyclo-cross; Mountain biking; Road
- Role: Rider

Amateur teams
- 2010: Southern Maine Junior Cycling
- 2011–2014: Trek Cyclocross Collective
- 2014–2016: JAM Fund
- 2016–2017: Aspire Racing

Professional teams
- 2017: Colavita/Bianchi
- 2018–: Trek Factory Racing (off-road)
- 2019: Trek–Segafredo (road)

Ellen Rose Noble (born December 3, 1995) is a retired American professional racing cyclist, who last rode for Trek Factory Racing in cyclo-cross and mountain bike racing. In 2019, Noble was named as part of UCI Women's Team Trek–Segafredo for the women's road cycling season.

== Major results ==
=== 2018 ===
2nd United States National Cyclo-cross Championships
3rd United States National Cyclo-Cross Championships

=== 2017 ===
2nd UCI U23 Cyclo-cross World Championships
1st U23 United States National Cyclo-cross Championships

=== 2016 ===
1st U23 United States National Cyclo-cross Championships
