= 2014 Grand Prix cycliste de Gatineau =

Race details
- Dates: 7 June 2014
- Stages: 1
- Distance: 122.16 km (75.91 mi)
- Winning time: 3h 13' 24"

Results
	Winner	Denise Ramsden (CAN)	(Optum–Kelly Benefit Strategies)
	Second	Flávia Oliveira (BRA)	(Firefighters Upsala CK)
	Third	Jasmin Glaesser (CAN)	(Team TIBCO - To The Top)

The 2014 Grand Prix cycliste de Gatineau was a one-day women's cycle race held in Canada on 7 June 2014. The race has an UCI rating of 1.1.

Result

	Rider	Team	Time
1	Denise Ramsden (CAN)	Team Optum p/b Kelly Benefit Strategies	3h 13' 24"
2	Flávia Oliveira (BRA)	Firefighters Upsala CK	s.t.
3	Jasmin Glaesser (CAN)	Team TIBCO - To The Top	+ 2"
4	Lex Albrecht (CAN)	Exergy TWENTY16	+ 2"
5	Khristi Lay (CAN)	SAS-Mazda-Macogep p/b SPECIALIZED	+ 2"
6	Justine Clift (CAN)		+ 8"
7	Leah Kirchmann (CAN)	Optum–Kelly Benefit Strategies	+ 1' 22"
8	Joanne Kiesanowski (AUS)	Team Optum p/b Kelly Benefit Strategies	+ 1' 22"
9	Samantha Schneider (USA)	Team TIBCO - To The Top	+ 1' 22"
10	Kristin Lotito (USA)		+ 1' 24"
