= Gabrielle Pilote Fortin =

Canadian cyclist

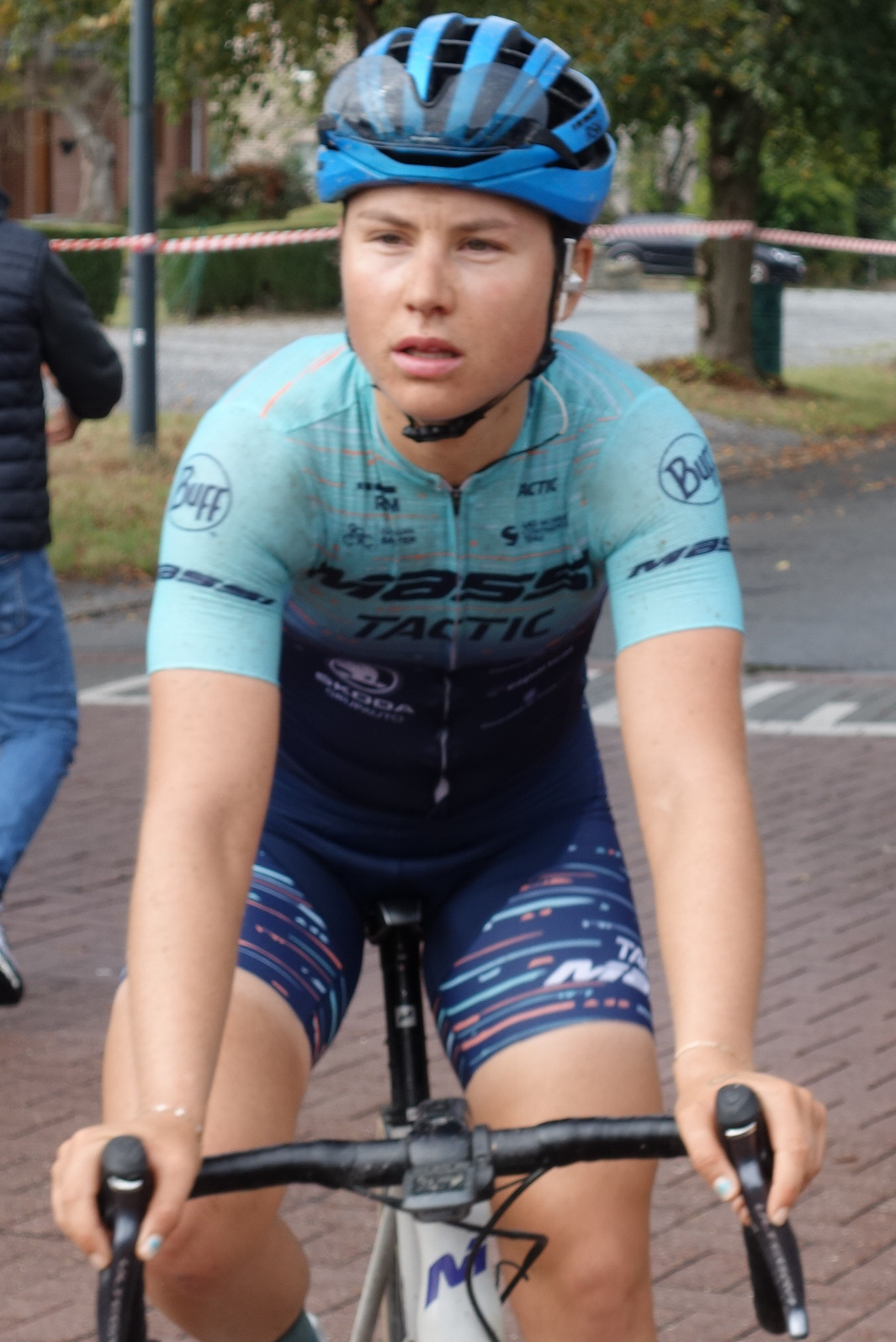
- Pilote Fortin in 2020

Personal information
- Full name: Gabrielle Pilote Fortin
- Born: 26 April 1993 (age 33) Neuville, Quebec, Canada

Cycling career
- Sport: Cycling
- Discipline: Road
- Role: Rider
- Rider type: Climber

Amateur team
- 2015: Visit Dallas Cycling

Professional teams
- 2014: Poitou-Charentes.Futuroscope.86
- 2016–2017: Cervélo–Bigla Pro Cycling
- 2018–2019: WNT–Rotor Pro Cycling
- 2020–2021: Massi–Tactic
- 2022–2023: Cofidis Women Team

Gabrielle Pilote Fortin (born 26 April 1993) is a Canadian former professional racing cyclist and trail runner for Nike Elite, who finished her cycling career in 2023 in UCI Women's World Tour team Cofidis Women Team

== See also ==
- List of 2016 UCI Women's Teams and riders

== Major results ==
2014
5th Road race, National Road Championships
2015
5th Road race, National Road Championships
2019
10th Grand Prix International d'Isbergues
2020
8th La Périgord Ladies
