= Denise Ramsden (cyclist) =

Canadian road bicycle racer (born 1990)

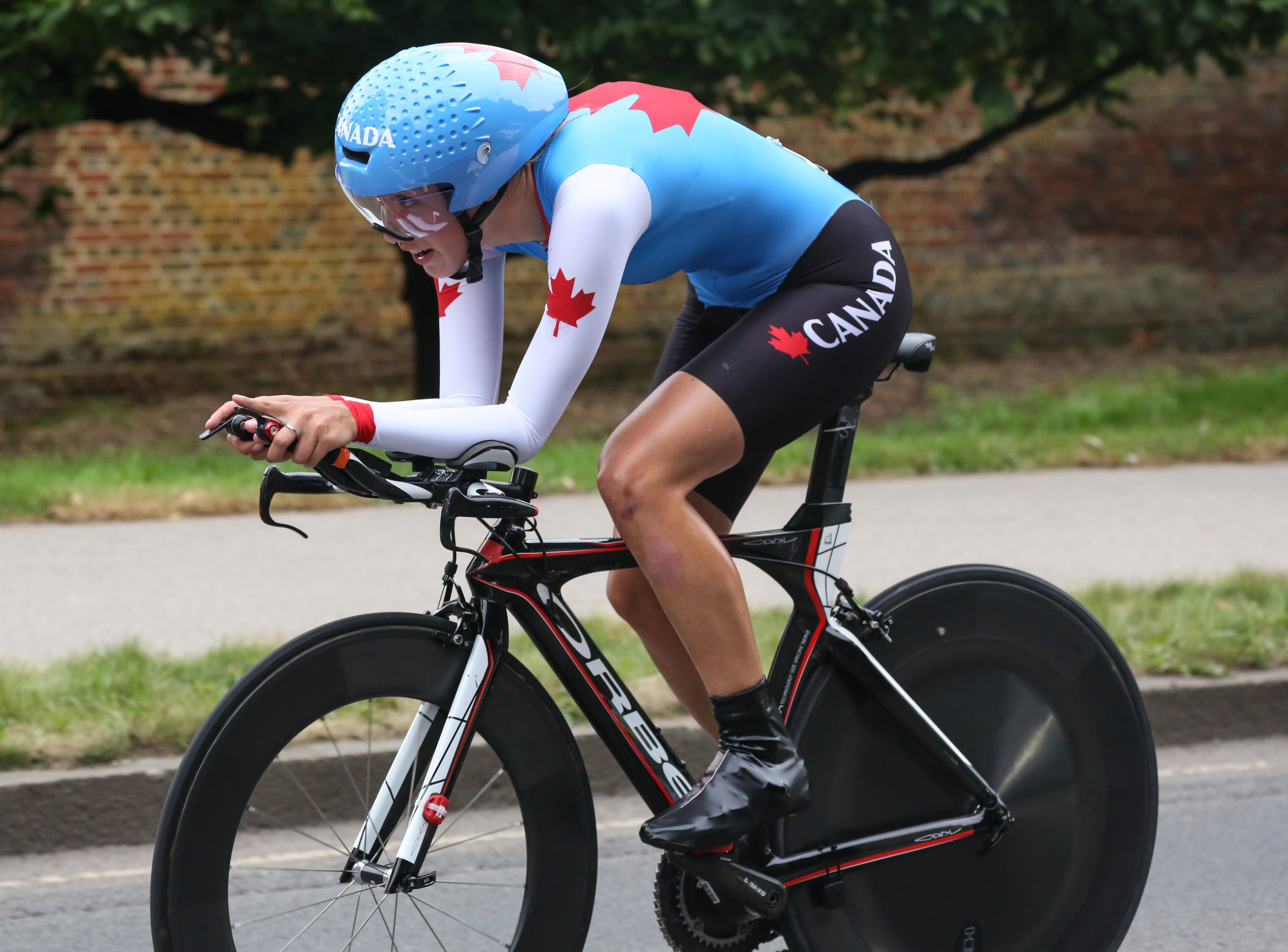
- Ramsden competing in the 2012 Olympics time trial in London

Personal information
- Full name: Denise Marie Ramsden
- Nickname: Denny
- Born: 21 November 1990 (age 35) Hay River, Northwest Territories, Canada
- Height: 1.70 m (5 ft 7 in)
- Weight: 62 kg (137 lb)

Cycling career
- Sport: Cycling
- Current team: Retired
- Discipline: Road
- Role: Rider

Amateur teams
- 2009–2010: Team Kenda Tire
- 2012: Optum Pro Cycling
- 2015–2017: Trek Red Truck Racing p/b Mosaic Homes

Professional teams
- 2011: Juvederm–Specialized
- 2013–2014: Optum–Kelly Benefit Strategies

Denise Marie Ramsden (born 21 November 1990) is a Canadian former road bicycle racer. She competed at the 2012 Summer Olympics in the women's road race, finishing 27th and in the women's time trial finishing 19th.

== Personal life ==
Ramsden graduated from the University of British Columbia in 2013, and also graduated with a Juris Doctor from the University of Toronto Faculty of Law in 2018. She now works as an associate with Canadian international corporate law firm Torys.

== Major results ==
2007
1st Road race, National Junior Road Championships
2008
1st Road race, National Junior Road Championships
2009
1st Time trial, Canada Summer Games
National Under-23 Road Championships

2nd Road race
2nd Time trial

2011
National Under-23 Road Championships

1st Road race
1st Time trial

Pan American Road Championships

5th Time trial
6th Road race

7th Time trial, Pan American Games
7th Chrono Gatineau
2012
1st Road race, National Road Championships
6th Time trial, Pan American Road Championships
2013
9th Chrono Gatineau
10th Overall Tour Cycliste Féminin International de l'Ardèche
2014
1st Grand Prix cycliste de Gatineau
2nd Road race, National Road Championships
10th Winston-Salem Cycling Classic
2015
1st Gastown Grand Prix
2nd Criterium, National Road Championships
6th White Spot / Delta Road Race
