= 2013 Chrono Gatineau =

Race details
- Dates: 20 May 2013
- Stages: 1
- Distance: 19.6 km (12.18 mi)
- Winning time: 24' 51"

Results
	Winner	Carmen Small (ITA)	(Velocio–SRAM Pro Cycling)
	Second	Joëlle Numainville (CAN)	(Team Optum p/b Kelly Benefit Strategies)
	Third	Chantal Blaak (NED)	(Team TIBCO)

The 2013 Chrono Gatineau was a one-day women's cycle race held in Canada on May 20 2013. The tour has an UCI rating of 1.1. The race was won by the Carmen Small of Velocio–SRAM Pro Cycling.

Result

	Rider	Team	Time
1	Carmen Small (USA)	Velocio–SRAM Pro Cycling	24' 51"
2	Joëlle Numainville (CAN)	Team Optum p/b Kelly Benefit Strategies	+ 28"
3	Chantal Blaak (NED)	Team TIBCO	+ 36"
4	Janel Holcomb (USA)	Team Optum p/b Kelly Benefit Strategies	+ 40"
5	Lauren Hall (USA)	Team Optum p/b Kelly Benefit Strategies	+ 46"
6	Claudia Häusler (USA)	Team TIBCO	+ 50"
7	Shelley Olds (USA)	Team TIBCO	+ 58"
8	Jamie Dinkins (USA)		+ 1' 03"
9	Denise Ramsden (CAN)	Team Optum p/b Kelly Benefit Strategies	+ 1' 06"
10	Lex Albecht (CAN)		+ 1' 14"
