= ROXO Racing =

Italian cycling team

Team information
- Registered: USA
- Founded: 2021
- Discipline: Road
- Status: National (2021–2022); UCI Women's Continental Team (2023–)

Team name history
- 2021–: ROXO Racing

ROXO Racing is an American women's road cycling team that was founded in 2021, registering as a professional team in 2023.

== Major results ==
2023
Stage 1 Tucson Bicycle Classic, Emily Marcolini
Stage 4 Vuelta a Colombia Femenina, Nadia Gontova
