= Tayler Wiles =

American cyclist

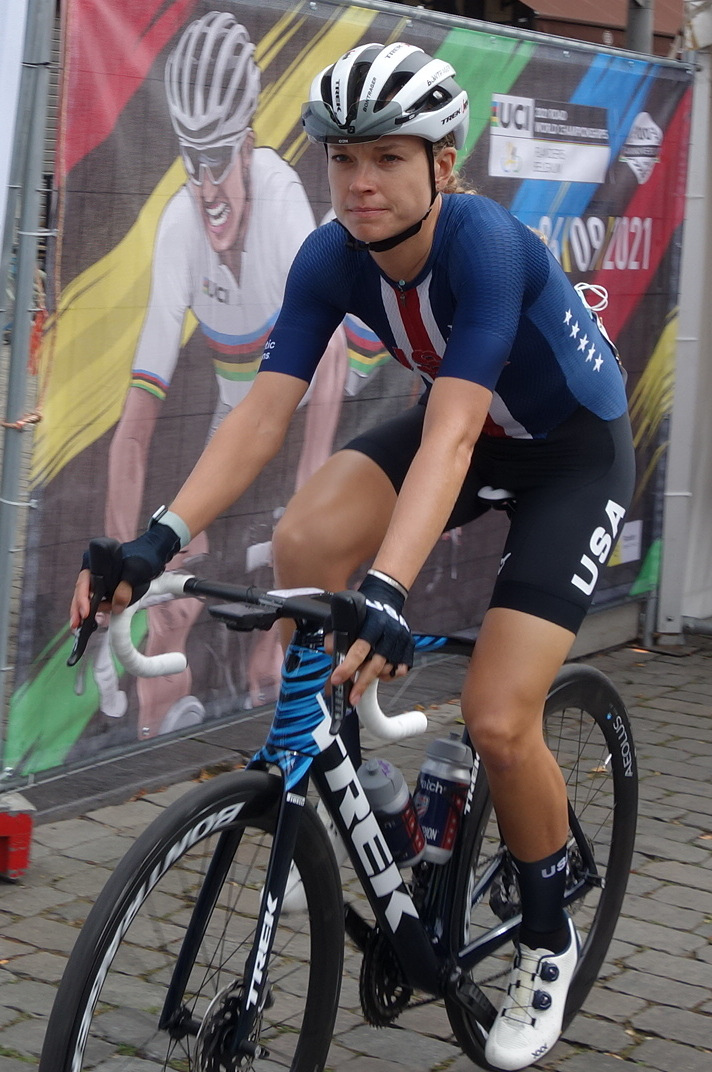
- Tayler Wiles in 2021

Personal information
- Full name: Tayler Wiles
- Nickname: Cookie Monster
- Born: July 20, 1989 (age 37)

Cycling career
- Sport: Cycling
- Discipline: Road
- Role: Rider
- Rider type: All-rounder

Amateur team
- 2012: Exergy Twenty12

Professional teams
- 2013–2015: Specialized–lululemon
- 2016: Orica–AIS
- 2017: UnitedHealthcare
- 2018: Trek–Drops
- 2019–2023: Trek–Segafredo

Major wins
- Stage races Women's Tour of New Zealand (2015) Tour Cycliste Féminin International de l'Ardèche (2015) Tour of the Gila (2017) One day races Chrono Gatineau (2014)
Medal record
Women's road bicycle racing
Representing United States
Pan American Championships
Silver medal – second place	2017 Santo Domingo	Time trial

Tayler Wiles (born July 20, 1989) is a former American pro cyclist, who used to ride for UCI Women's WorldTeam Lidl–Trek. She rode at the 2014 UCI Road World Championships. Wiles originally played soccer until she entered the University of Utah as a pre-medical student at the age of 18. She subsequently took up cycling with her then boyfriend during her sophomore year in 2008.

== Personal life ==
Wiles is openly gay. She is married to former professional cyclist Olivia Dillon.

== Major results ==
2012
3rd Overall Tour Cycliste Féminin International de l'Ardèche
2013
1st Stage 1 (TTT) Belgium Tour
National Road Championships

8th Time trial
9th Road race

2014
1st Overall Rás na mBan

1st Queen of the Mountains classification
1st Stage 2

1st Chrono Gatineau
2nd Overall Tour Cycliste Féminin International de l'Ardèche
National Road Championships

4th Road race
4th Time trial

2015
1st Overall Women's Tour of New Zealand

1st Stages 1 (TTT) & 4

1st Overall Tour Cycliste Féminin International de l'Ardèche

1st Points classification
1st Stage 3

1st Stage 2a (TTT) Energiewacht Tour
National Road Championships

3rd Road race
9th Time trial

3rd Chrono Gatineau
5th Amgen Tour of California Women's Invitational Time Trial
8th Winston-Salem Cycling Classic
10th Time trial, EPZ Omloop van Borsele
2016
2nd Overall La Route de France
4th Overall Tour de Feminin-O cenu Českého Švýcarska
7th Time trial, National Road Championships
7th Chrono Gatineau
7th Winston-Salem Cycling Classic
7th Cadel Evans Great Ocean Road Race
2017
1st Overall Tour of the Gila
2nd Time trial, Pan American Road Championships
2nd Overall Tour de Feminin-O cenu Českého Švýcarska

1st Mountains classification

4th Chrono Gatineau
5th Time trial, National Road Championships
5th Overall Thüringen Rundfahrt der Frauen

1st Mountains classification
1st Stage 5
Active rider classification, Stage 2

8th Overall Joe Martin Stage Race
2018
2nd Time trial, National Road Championships
2nd Overall Tour of California
3rd Chrono Gatineau
4th Overall Holland Ladies Tour
10th UCI Road World Championships – Women's time trial
10th Overall Thüringen Rundfahrt der Frauen
2019
1st Postnord UCI WWT Vårgårda West Sweden TTT
3rd Chrono Gatineau
4th Overall Emakumeen Bira

1st Stage 3

2020
1st Stage 1 (TTT) Giro Rosa
3rd Race Torquay
4th Cadel Evans Great Ocean Road Race
2021
1st Stage 1 (TTT) Giro Rosa

== See also ==
- 2013 Specialized–lululemon season
- 2014 Specialized–lululemon season
