= 2013 Grand Prix cycliste de Gatineau =

Race details
- Dates: 18 May 2013
- Stages: 1
- Distance: 122.2 km (75.93 mi)
- Winning time: 3h 12' 18"

Results
	Winner	Shelley Olds (USA)	(Team TIBCO - To The Top)
	Second	Joëlle Numainville (CAN)	(Team Optum p/b Kelly Benefit Strategies)
	Third	Katarzyna Pawłowska (POL)	(GSD Gestion — Kallisto)

The 2013 Grand Prix cycliste de Gatineau was a one-day women's cycle race held in Canada on 18 May 2013. The tour has an UCI rating of 1.1. The race was won by the Shelley Olds of Team TIBCO - To The Top.

Result

	Rider	Team	Time
1	Shelley Olds (USA)	Team TIBCO - To The Top	3h 12' 18"
2	Joëlle Numainville (CAN)	Team Optum p/b Kelly Benefit Strategies	s.t.
3	Katarzyna Pawłowska (POL)	GSD Gestion — Kallisto	s.t.
4	Lauren Hall (USA)	Team Optum p/b Kelly Benefit Strategies	s.t.
5	Laura Brown (CAN)		s.t.
6	Lenore Pipes (GUM)		s.t.
7	Chantal Blaak (NED)	Team TIBCO - To The Top	s.t.
8	Joanne Kiesanowski (NZL)	Team TIBCO - To The Top	s.t.
9	Lindsay Bayer (USA)		s.t.
10	Morgan Patton (USA)		s.t.
