= Chrono Gatineau =

Canadian one-day road cycling race

Race details
- Date: Various
- Region: Gatineau, Canada
- Discipline: Time trial
- Web site: grandprixcyclistegatineau.com

History
- First edition: 2010
- Editions: 13 (as of 2025)
- First winner: Evelyn Stevens (USA)
- Most wins: Amber Neben (USA) (3 wins)
- Most recent: Lieke Nooijen (NED)

Chrono Gatineau is an elite women's professional one-day time trial held in Canada and is currently rated by the Union Cycliste Internationale (UCI) as a 1.1 race. In the same week, the Grand Prix Cycliste de Gatineau is held.

== Past winners ==
Year	Country	Rider	Team
2010	United States	Evelyn Stevens	Team HTC–Columbia Women
2011	Canada	Clara Hughes	Canada (national team)
2012	Canada	Clara Hughes	Team Specialized–lululemon
2013	United States	Carmen Small	Specialized–lululemon
2014	United States	Tayler Wiles	Specialized–lululemon
2015	United States	Carmen Small	Twenty16 p/b Sho-Air
2016	United States	Amber Neben	Bepink
2017	United States	Lauren Stephens	Tibco–Silicon Valley Bank
2018	United States	Amber Neben	United States (national team)
2019	United States	Amber Neben	Cogeas–Mettler–Look
2020– 2022	No race due to the COVID-19 pandemic in Quebec		
2023	Austria	Anna Kiesenhofer	Israel Premier Tech Roland
2024	Germany	Franziska Brauße	Ceratizit–WNT Pro Cycling
2025	Netherlands	Lieke Nooijen	Visma–Lease a Bike
