= Colavita–HelloFresh =

Women's professional cycling team

Team information
- Registered: USA
- Founded: 2003
- Discipline: Road
- Status: National (2003–2015); UCI Women's Team (2016–2017); National (2018–)
- Bicycles: Bianchi Bikes

Team name history
- 2003 2004 2005 2006 2007–2009 2010 2011 2012 2013–2015 2016–2017 2018–2019 2020 2021: Colavita Bolla Wines; Colavita–Olive Oil; Colavita–Sutter Pro Cycling Team; Colavita Olive Oil–Sutter Home Wines Cycling Team; Colavita–Sutter Home p/b Cooking Light; Colavita/Baci Women's Cycling Team; Colavita-Forno d'Asolo Women's Cycling Team; Colavita–espnW Pro Cycling Team; Colavita–Fine Cooking; Colavita/Bianchi; Colavita–Bialetti; Colavita–Cavaliere d'Oro; Colavita–HelloFresh

Colavita–HelloFresh is a professional women's cycling team based in the United States that competes in elite road bicycle racing events.

Colavita started sponsoring the team in 2003; in August 2017 the company said that it intended to withdraw its sponsorship at the end of the year.

== Team roster ==
Rider	Date of birth
Whitney Allison (USA)	March 1, 1988 (age 38)
Gillian Ellsay (CAN)	March 26, 1997 (age 29)
Astrid Gassner (AUT)	30 October 1995 (age 30)
Emma Grant (GBR)	September 30, 1991 (age 34)
Kendelle Hodges (AUS)	November 15, 1991 (age 34)

Rider	Date of birth
Abigail Mickey (USA)	July 3, 1990 (age 36)
Jessica Mundy (AUS)	September 25, 1994 (age 31)
Ellen Noble (USA)	December 3, 1995 (age 30)
Amber Pierce (USA)	March 25, 1981 (age 45)
Ellen Watters (CAN)	4 April 1988 (age 38)

== Major wins ==
2009
Stage 3 Tour de Vineyards, Catherine Cheatley Sell
Stage 1 Sea Otter Classic, Kelly Fisher Goodwin
Stage 2 Sea Otter Classic, Tiffany Cromwell
Roswell Criterium, Tina Pic
Beaufort Criterium, Kelly Fisher Goodwin
Sandy Springs Criterium, Tina Pic
Tour of Somerville Criterium, Tina Pic
Arlington Criterium, Erica Allar
Stage 3 Nature Valley Grand Prix, Erica Allar
Stage 2 Fitchburg Longsjo Classic, Tina Pic
Stage 3 Fitchburg Longsjo Classic, Andrea Dvorak
Stage 4 Fitchburg Longsjo Classic, Tina Pic
Stage 2 Route de France Féminine, Tiffany Cromwell

2010
Overall Valley of the Sun Stage Race, Carmen Small
Stage 2 San Dimas Stage Race, Kelly Fisher Goodwin
Stage 2 Redlands Bicycle Classic, Theresa Cliff-Ryan
Stages 2 & 3 Joe Martin Stage Race, Modesta Vžesniauskaitė
Overall Fitchburg Longsjo Classic, Catherine Cheatley Sell

Stages 1 & 2, Catherine Cheatley Sell

Stage 1 Cascade Classic, Catherine Cheatley Sell
UCI Track – World Cup, Melbourne, Team Pursuit, Kate Bates
UCI Track – World Cup, Cali, Team Pursuit, Rushlee Buchanan

2013
UCI Track – World Cup, Guadalajara, Team Pursuit, Laura Brown
UCI Track – World Cup, Manchester, Points race, Laura Brown
UCI Track – World Cup, Los Angeles, Team Pursuit, Laura Brown

2014
Stage 5 Ras na mBan, Olivia Dillon

2016
Grand Prix Cycliste de Gatineau Road Race, Kimberley Wells
Stage 4 Tour Down Under, Kimberley Wells
Dottignies Road Race Elite/U23, Kimberley Wells
Giro di Burnaby Criterium, Kimberley Wells
Stage 4 Cascade Classic, Kimberley Wells

2017
Rochester Cyclo-cross, Ellen Noble
Gloucester Cyclo-cross, Ellen Noble
Cincinnati Cyclo-cross, Ellen Noble

== Regional & national champions ==
2009
USA Criterium, Tina Pic

2010
New Zealand Road Race, Rushlee Buchanan
New Zealand Track (Scratch race), Rushlee Buchanan
New Zealand Track (Team pursuit), Rushlee Buchanan

2013
Caribbean Time Trial, Kathryn Bertine

2017
USA U23 Cyclo-cross, Ellen Noble
