= DNA Pro Cycling =

American cycling team

Team information
- UCI code: DNA
- Registered: United States
- Founded: 2012
- Disbanded: 2024
- Discipline: Road
- Status: National Team (2012–2015); UCI Women's Team (2016–2017); National Team (2018–2019); UCI Women's Continental Team (2020–2024)
- Website: Team home page

Key personnel
- Team managers: Catherine Kim; Lee Whaley

Team name history
- 2012 2013–2014 2015 2015 2016–2017 2018–2024: FCS–Rouse p/b Mr. Restore; FCS Cycling Team; Visit Dallas Cycling p/b Noise4Good; Visit Dallas Cycling; Visit Dallas DNA Pro Cycling; DNA Pro Cycling

DNA Pro Cycling was a professional UCI Women's Team, based in the United States.

It competed in elite women's road bicycle racing events. It was founded in 2012, at the end of the 2015 season the team merged with DNA Cycling p/b K4 forming the current UCI-level team.

In October 2019, the team announced that they would return to the UCI rankings.

In July 2024, DNA Pro Cycling announced that the team would cease operations at the end of 2024, after 12 years of competition.

== Major wins ==
2015
Overall San Dimas Stage Race, Amber Neben

Stage 1 (ITT), Amber Neben

2017
Points classification Redlands Bicycle Classic, Claire Rose

Mountains classification, Claire Rose
Stage 4, Claire Rose

Stages 2 (ITT) & 4 Cascade Cycling Classic, Claire Rose

2022
Youth classification Tour of the Gila, Anet Barrera
Stage 4 Joe Martin Stage Race, Maggie Coles-Lyster
Commonwealth Games, Track (Points race), Maggie Coles-Lyster
Overall Tour de Colombia, Diana Peñuela

Stages 1, 2, 3 & 4, Diana Peñuela

2023
Overall Egmont Cycling Race, Heidi Franz
2nd, Vuelta a Colombia Feminina, Danian Penuela

2024
Overall, Stage 2 Redlands Classic, Nadia Gontova
2nd, Tour of the Gila, Nadia Gontova
2nd, Vuelta a Colombia Feminina, Nadia Gontova
2nd, Ghrono de Gatineau, Nadia Gontova
3rd, Tour de Gatineau, Sarah Van Dam

== National champions ==
2017
New Zealand Track (Madison), Michaela Drummond
British Time Trial, Claire Rose
2019
New Zealand Track (Omnium), Michaela Drummond
2021
New Zealand Track (Team Pursuit), Nicole Shields
2022
Colombian Road Race, Diana Peñuela
Canada Road Race, Maggie Coles-Lyster
2023
Colombian Road Race, Diana Peñuela
