= Virginia's Blue Ridge–TWENTY24 =

American cycling team

Virginia's Blue Ridge TWENTY24
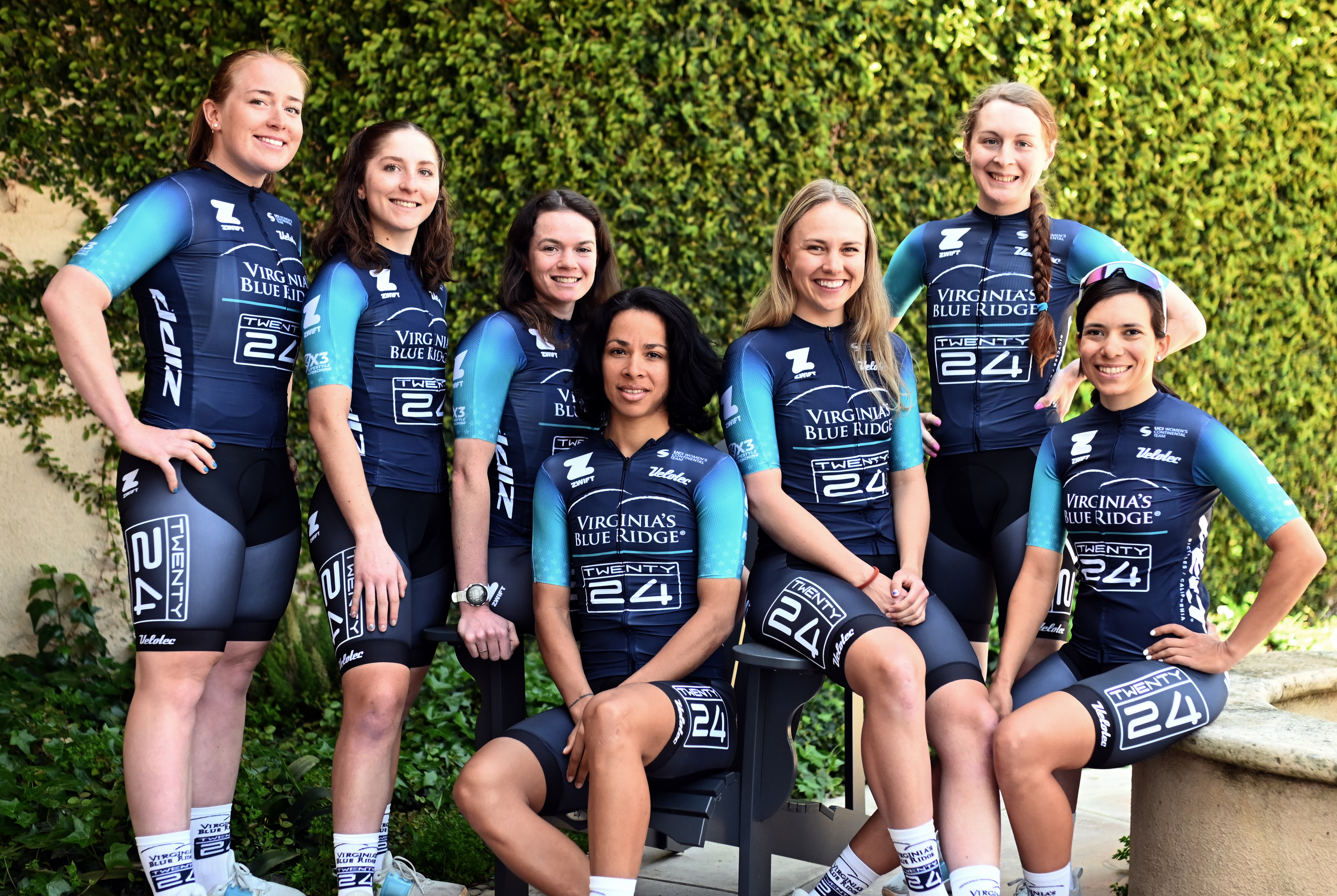

Team information
- UCI code: T24
- Registered: United States
- Founded: 2005
- Discipline: Road
- Status: National Team (2005–2011); UCI Women's Team (2012–2013); National Team (2014); UCI Women's Team (2015–2019); UCI Team (2020-)
- Bicycles: Felt

Key personnel
- General manager: Nicola Cranmer
- Team managers: Nicola Cranmer; Kristin Armstrong (High Performance Director)

Team name history
- 2005–2009 2010–2011 2012 2013 2014 2015 2016 2017 2018 2019–2020 2021–2022 2023–: ProMan Hit Squad; Peanut Butter & Co Twenty12; Exergy Twenty12; Exergy Twenty16; Twenty16; Twenty16 presented by Sho-Air; TWENTY16–Ridebiker; Sho-Air TWENTY20; TWENTY20 p/b Sho-Air; Sho-Air TWENTY20; Twenty24 Pro Cycling; Virginia's Blue Ridge–TWENTY24
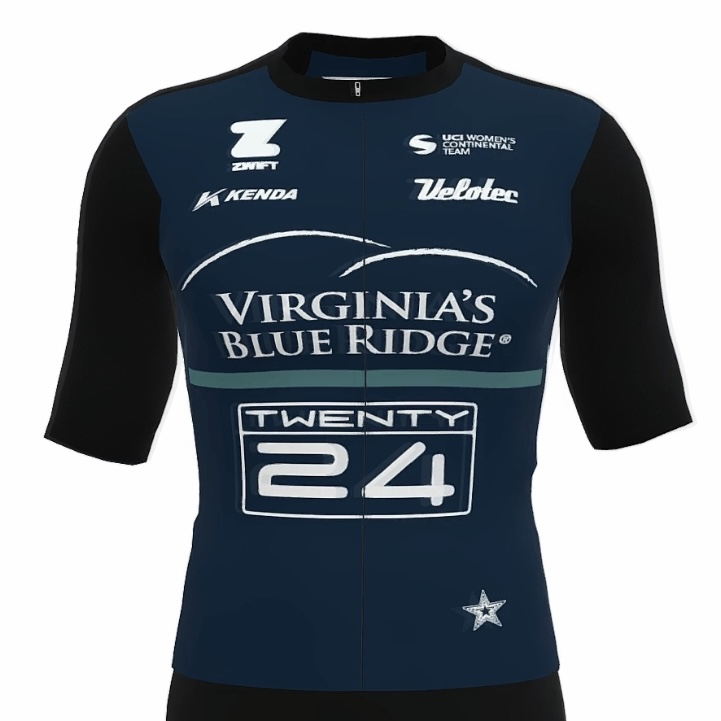
Virginia's Blue Ridge–TWENTY24 jersey
Jersey

Virginia's Blue Ridge TWENTY24 is a professional Women's road bicycle racing team based in the United States. The team's most notable riders are 3-time Olympic time trial champion Kristin Armstrong, 2013 Giro d'Italia Femminile overall winner Mara Abbott, and 3-time Olympic medalist Jennifer Valente.

== Team history ==
The team was founded in 2005 as ProMan Hit Squad, but in 2009 the team was renamed Twenty12 to reflect the team's focus on developing riders for the 2012 Olympic Games. This subsequently brought Exergy on board as a sponsor of the team as well as receiving UCI status. For the 2013 season (and after the 2012 Olympics) the team was renamed Exergy Twenty16 to reflect the new focus on the 2016 Olympic Games, however in late 2013 Exergy's sponsorship of the team ended.

For the 2014 season the team dropped back down to a Nationally ranked elite women's team and primarily raced the US domestic circuit. For the 2015 season the team was known as Twenty16 presented by Sho-Air as the team secured title sponsorship by Sho-Air (an international asset management and transportation company) as well as becoming a UCI team again, increasing the number of US based UCI Women's teams to five; Optum–KBS, Team TIBCO–SVB, UnitedHealthcare and newly promoted Pepper Palace p/b The Happy Tooth being the other four. In preparation for the 2015 season the team signed double World Team Time Trial champion Carmen Small as well as 2014 Gent–Wevelgem champion Lauren Hall. The team also signed; Jess Cerra, Lauren Komanski, Allie Dragoo, Kaitie Antonneau, Andrea Dvorak, Alison Jackson, Allison Arensman, Amber Gaffney, Maddy Boutet and Summer Moak.

In October 2020, the team announced they would be changing their name to Twenty24 Pro Cycling and would focus on developing riders for the 2024 Olympics.

== Team roster ==
As of July 7, 2019.

Rider	Date of birth
Sofía Arreola (MEX)	April 22, 1991 (age 35)
Simone Boilard (CAN)	July 21, 2000 (age 26)
Erica Clevenger (USA)	May 1, 1994 (age 32)
Margot Clyne (USA)	February 27, 1995 (age 31)
Jasmin Duehring (CAN)	July 8, 1992 (age 34)
Chloé Dygert Owen (USA)	January 1, 1997 (age 29)
Emma Grant (GBR)	September 30, 1991 (age 34)

Rider	Date of birth
Allie Legg (USA)	December 17, 1989 (age 36)
Jennifer Luebke (USA)	April 1, 1986 (age 40)
Shayna Powless (USA)	January 8, 1994 (age 32)
Stephanie Roorda (CAN)	December 3, 1986 (age 39)
Georgia Simmerling (CAN)	March 11, 1989 (age 37)
Jennifer Valente (USA)	December 24, 1994 (age 31)
Melanie Wong (USA)	October 30, 1986 (age 39)

== Major wins ==
2012
Stage 1 Women's Tour of New Zealand, Kristin Armstrong
Stage 1 The Exergy Tour, Theresa Cliff-Ryan
Stage 8 La Route de France, Andrea Dvorak
2013
Overall Giro d'Italia Femminile, Mara Abbott

Stages 5 & 6, Mara Abbott

2015
Stage 1 Redlands Bicycle Classic, Alison Jackson
Chrono Gatineau, Carmen Small
Stage 3 Holland Ladies Tour, Lauren Hall
2016
Stage 2 Tour of California, Team time trial
Youth classification Tour of California, Chloé Dygert
Team classification Tour of California
Overall Valley of the Sun, Allie Dragoo

Stage 1 (ITT), Allie Dragoo
Stages 2 & 3, Alison Jackson

Overall San Dimas Stage Race, Kristin Armstrong

Stage 1 (ITT)

2017
Stage 3 (ITT) Tour of the Gila, Leah Thomas
Teams classification Cascade Cycling Classic
Combination classification Tour Cycliste Féminin International de l'Ardèche, Leah Thomas
2018
Overall Chico Stage Race, Allie Dragoo

Stage 3 (ITT), Allie Dragoo

Overall San Dimas Stage Race, Jasmin Glaesser

Stages 1 (ITT) & 2, Jasmin Glaesser
Stage 3, Erica Clevenger

Youth classification Joe Martin Stage Race, Chloé Dygert

Stage 4, Chloé Dygert

Stages 2 & 3 (ITT) Tour of the Gila, Chloé Dygert
Stage 3 Redlands Bicycle Classic, Jasmin Glaesser
Central American and Caribbean Sports Games Track Championships

Scratch Race, Marlies Mejías
Team Pursuit, Marlies Mejías
Individual Pursuit, Marlies Mejías

2019
Overall Joe Martin Stage Race, Chloé Dygert

Stages 1 & 4, Chloé Dygert

Overall Tour of the Gila, Chloé Dygert

Stages 3 (ITT) & 4

Chrono Kristin Armstrong, Chloé Dygert
Overall Colorado Classic, Chloé Dygert

Points classification, Chloé Dygert
Mountains classification, Chloé Dygert
Young rider classification, Chloé Dygert
Stages 1, 2, 3 & 4, Chloé Dygert

Chrono Kristin Armstrong, Chloé Dygert
2019–20 UCI Track Cycling World Cup – Minsk

Omnium, Jennifer Valente
Team Pursuit, Jennifer Valente
Team Pursuit, Chloé Dygert
Points Race, Jennifer Valente

Omnium, 2019–20 UCI Track Cycling World Cup – Brisbane, Jennifer Valente

== National, continental, world and Olympic champions ==
2012
Olympic Time Trial, Kristin Armstrong
USA Track (Team Pursuit), Jacquelyn Crowell
USA Track (Points race), Jacquelyn Crowell
2013
USA U23 Time Trial, Kaitlin Antonneau
USA U23 Road Race, Kaitlin Antonneau
USA Track (Scratch race), Jennifer Valente
2015
Panamerican Time Trial, Carmen Small
USA Time Trial, Kristin Armstrong
2016
Olympic Time Trial, Kristin Armstrong
2017
Word Track (Team pursuit), Chloé Dygert
Panamerican Time Trial, Chloé Dygert
Panamerican Track (Madison), Stephanie Roorda
Canada Track (Team Pursuit), Annie Foreman-Mackey
2018
Word Track (Team pursuit), Chloé Dygert
Cuba Time Trial, Marlies Mejías
USA Track (Omnium), Jennifer Valente
Panamerican Track (Team Pursuit), Jennifer Valente
Panamerican Track (Scratch Race), Jennifer Valente
Panamerican Track (Points Race), Jennifer Valente
2019
USA Track (Omnium), Jennifer Valente
USA Track (Scratch Race), Jennifer Valente
USA Track (Madison), Jennifer Valente
USA Track (Points Race), Jennifer Valente
Panamerican Track (Team Pursuit), Chloé Dygert
Panamerican Track (Team Pursuit), Georgia Simmerling
Panamerican Track (Omnium), Jennifer Valente
Panamerican Track (Scratch Race), Jennifer Valente
Panamerican Track (Individual Pursuit), Georgia Simmerling
Panamerican Track (Madison), Jennifer Valente
Panamerican Track (Points Race), Jennifer Valente
Panamerican Time Trial, Chloé Dygert
World Time Trial, Chloé Dygert
Canada Track (Individual Pursuit), Georgia Simmerling
Canada Track (Omnium), Stephanie Roorda
2025
USA Time Trial, Emily Ehrlich
