= 2015 UCI Road World Championships – Women's team time trial =

Women's team time trial
2015 UCI Road World Championships

Race details
- Dates: September 20, 2015
- Stages: 1
- Distance: 38.6 km (24.0 mi)
- Winning time: 47' 35.72"

Medalists
	Gold	Velocio–SRAM (GER)
	Silver	Boels–Dolmans (NED)
	Bronze	Rabobank-Liv Woman Cycling Team (NED)

The Women's team time trial of the 2015 UCI Road World Championships took place in and around in Richmond, Virginia, United States on September 20, 2015. The course of the race was 38.6 km (23.98 mi) with the start and finish in Richmond. It was the fourth edition of the team time trial event for UCI Women's Teams. Velocio–SRAM was the defending champion, having won all three previous editions in 2012, 2013 and 2014.

Velocio–SRAM maintained their 100% record in the event, winning the gold medal by 6.66 seconds ahead of Boels–Dolmans, with Rabobank-Liv Woman Cycling Team rounding out the podium, 56.12 seconds behind the winning time.

== Qualification ==
Invitations were sent to the 25 leading UCI Women's Teams in the UCI Team Ranking as of August 15, 2015. Teams that accepted the invitation within the deadline had the right to participate. Every participating team had the opportunity to register nine riders from its team roster, with the exception of stagiaires, and had to select six riders to compete in the event.

Also a few lower ranked American UCI teams were invited.

Teams that did not accept the invitation are listed below in italics.

#	Nat	Team
1	(Netherlands)	Rabobank-Liv Woman Cycling Team
2	(Netherlands)	Boels–Dolmans
3	(United Kingdom)	Wiggle–Honda
4	(Germany)	Velocio–SRAM
5	(Australia)	Orica–AIS
6	(Switzerland)	Bigla Pro Cycling Team
7	(Norway)	Team Hitec Products
8	(Netherlands)	Team Liv–Plantur
9	(Italy)	Alé–Cipollini
10	(United States)	UnitedHealthcare
11	(United States)	Optum–Kelly Benefit Strategies
12	(France)	Poitou-Charentes.Futuroscope.86
13	(United States)	Team TIBCO–SVB
14	(Belgium)	Lotto–Soudal Ladies
15	(Italy)	BePink–La Classica
16	(Italy)	Inpa Sottoli Giusfredi
17	(Slovenia)	BTC City Ljubljana
18	(Belgium)	Topsport Vlaanderen–Pro-Duo
19	(Netherlands)	Parkhotel Valkenburg Continental Team
20	(Spain)	Lointek
21	(United States)	Twenty16 p/b Sho-Air
22	(Italy)	Servetto Footon
23	(Belgium)	Lensworld.eu–Zannata
24	(Italy)	S.C. Michela Fanini Rox
25	(Italy)	Aromitalia Vaiano
	(United States)	BMW p/b Happy Tooth Dental
	(United States)	Pepper Palace p/b The Happy Tooth

== Course ==
The course rolled off from Henrico County at Lewis Ginter Botanical Garden, originally the Lakeside Wheel Club, founded in 1895 as a gathering spot for turn-of-the-century cyclists. The opening kilometers raced through Richmond's historic Northside neighborhoods leading into downtown. The course continued east of Richmond down rural Route 5, which parallels the 50-mile Virginia Capital Trail. The first few kilometers were scenic, flat, open roads that eventually narrowed and went through Richmond National Battlefield Park, a historic Civil War site. The race re-entered the city through Shockoe Bottom, eventually making a hard right turn on Governor Street to ascend 300 meters (980 feet). At the top, the teams had to take a sharp left turn onto the false-flat finishing straight, 680 meters (2,230 feet) to the finish.

== Schedule ==
All times are in Eastern Daylight Time (UTC−4).

Date	Time	Event
September 20, 2015	11:30–12:55	Women's team time trial

== Final classification ==
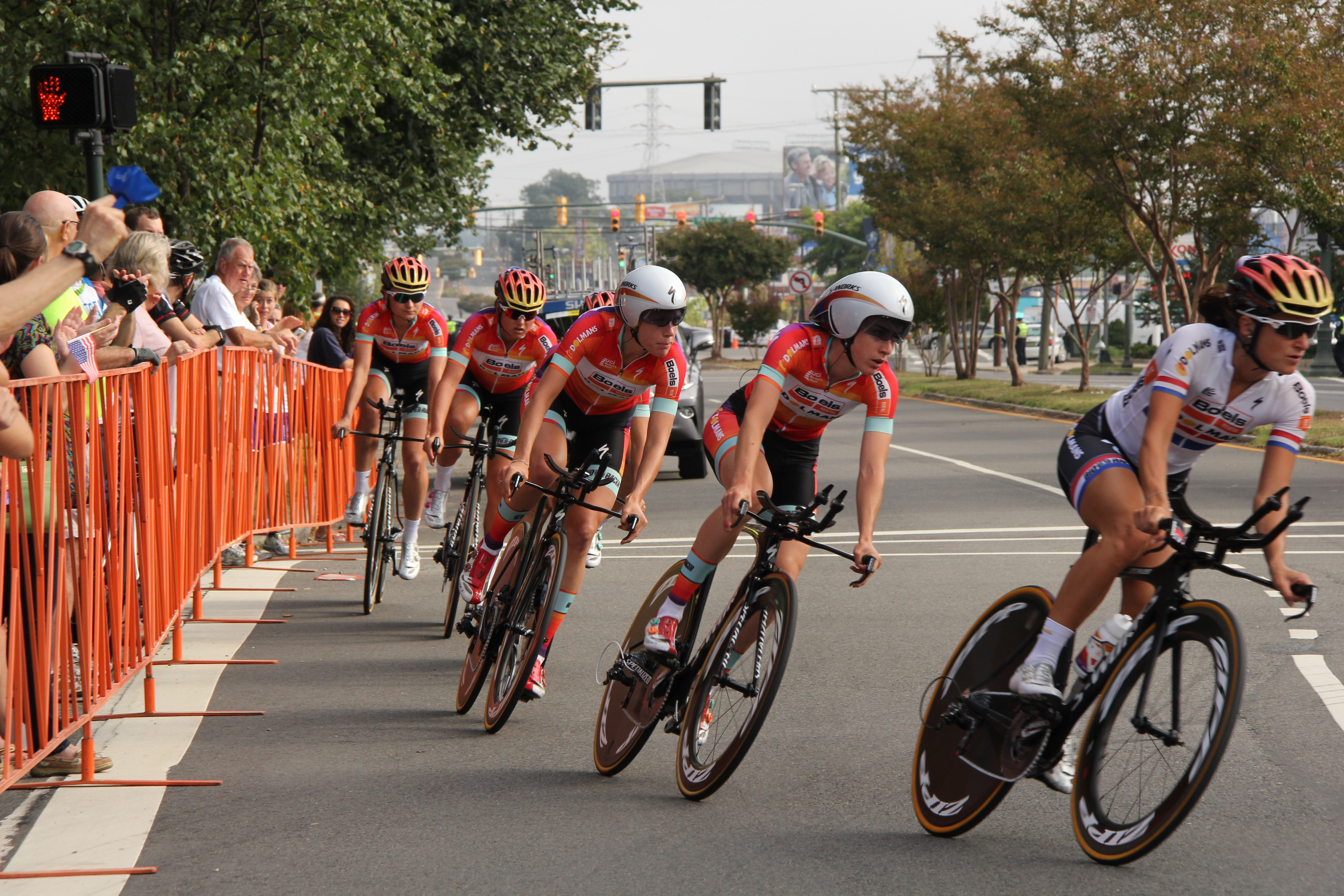
Boels Dolmans finished second

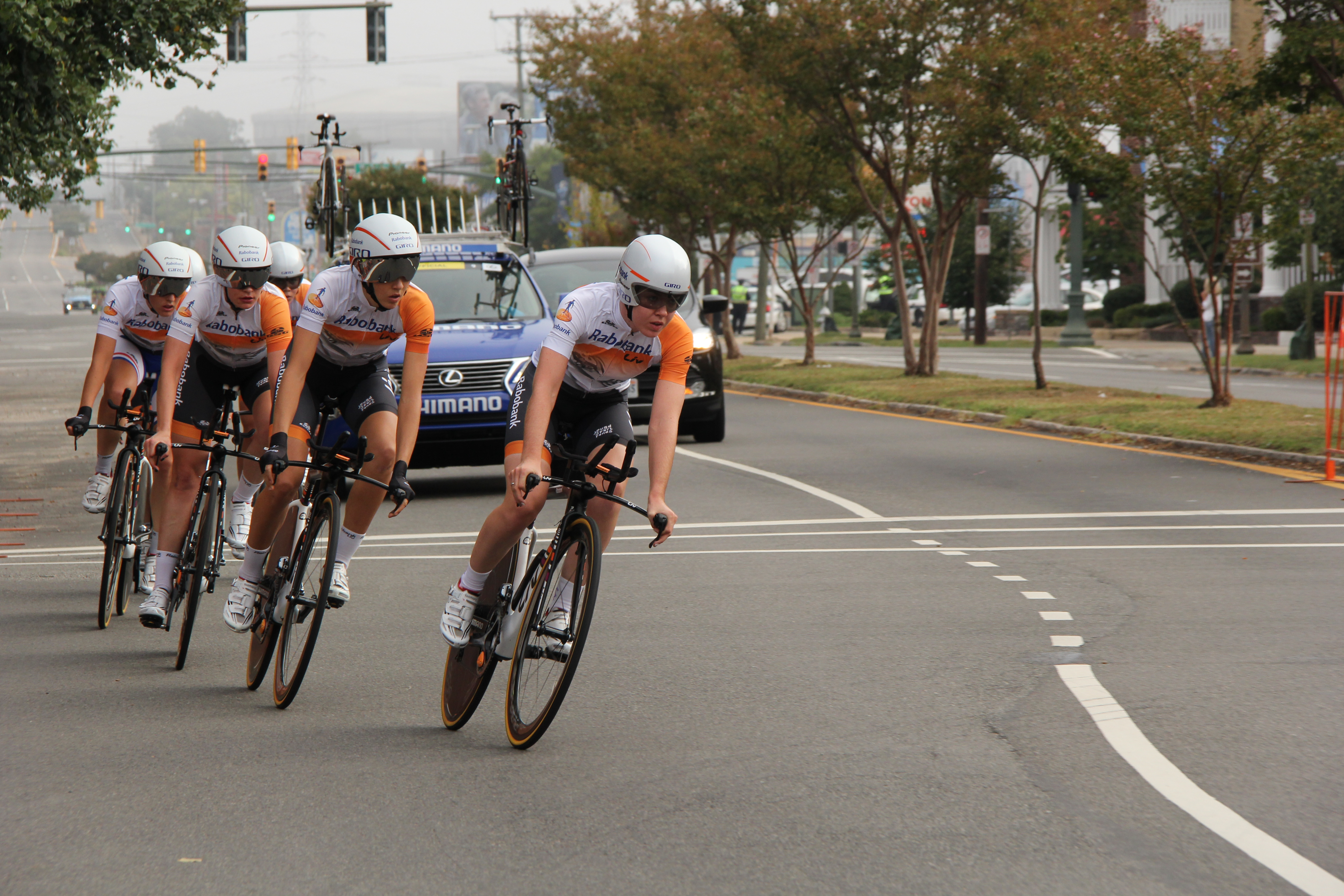
Rabobank-Liv Woman Cycling Team finished third

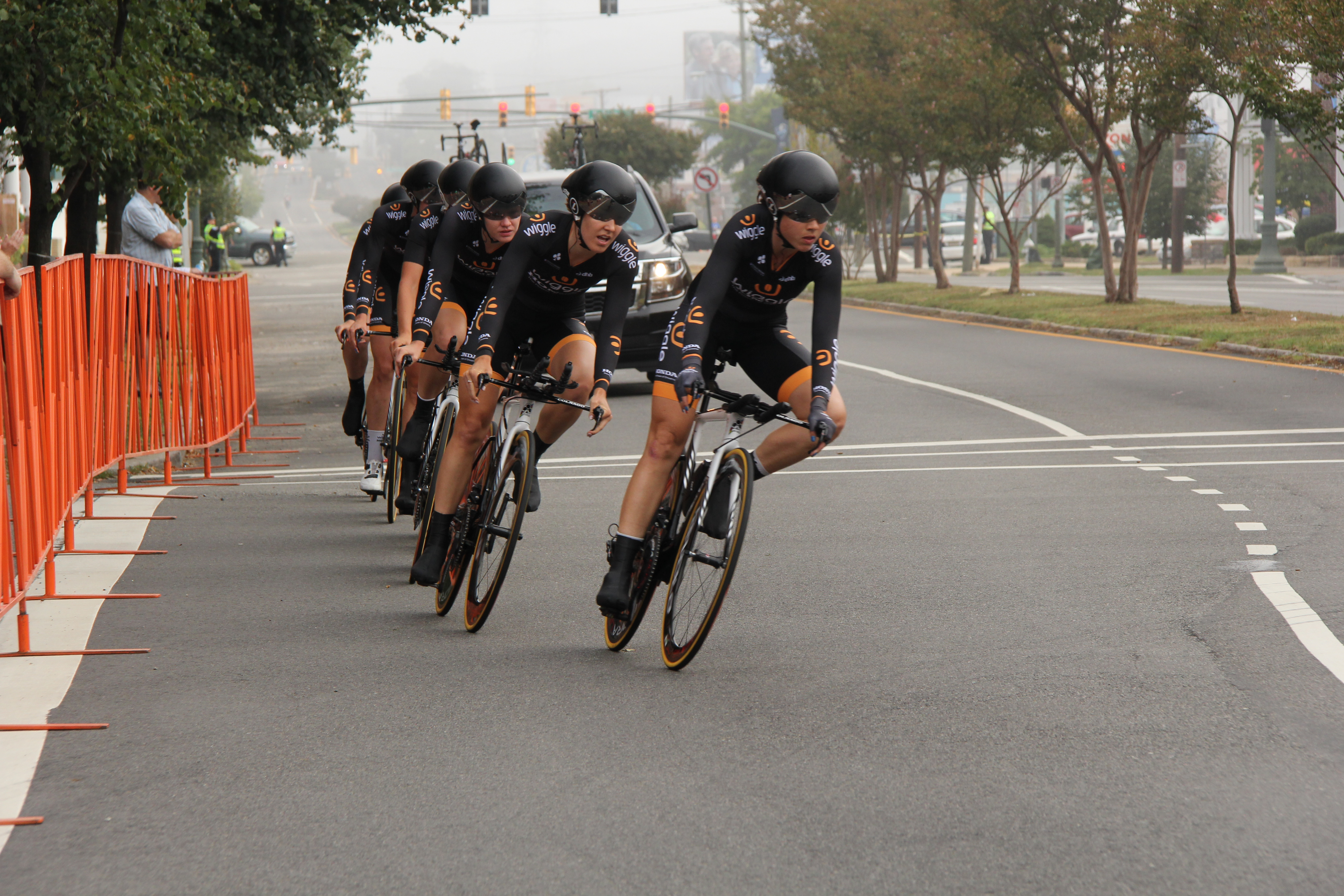
Wiggle-Honda finished fourth

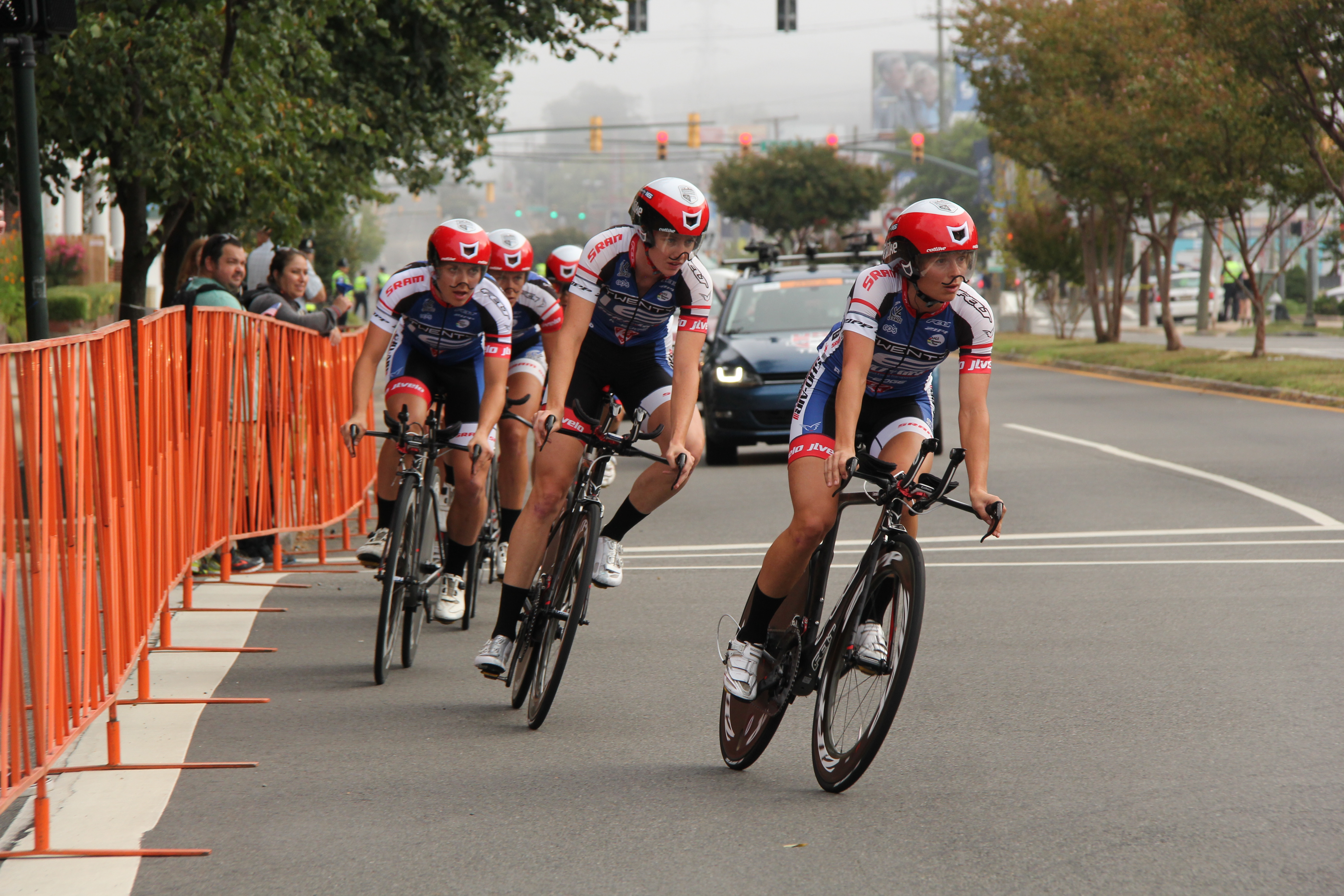
Twenty16 p/b Sho-Air finished fifth

Rank	Team	Riders	Time
1	(Germany) Velocio–SRAM	Alena Amialiusik (BLR); Lisa Brennauer (DEU); Karol-Ann Canuel (CAN); Barbara Guarischi (ITA); Mieke Kröger (DEU); Trixi Worrack (DEU)	47' 35.72"
2	(Netherlands) Boels–Dolmans	Lizzie Armitstead (GBR); Chantal Blaak (NED); Christine Majerus (LUX); Katarzyna Pawłowska (POL); Evelyn Stevens (USA); Ellen van Dijk (NED)	+ 6.66"
3	(Netherlands) Rabobank-Liv Woman Cycling Team	Lucinda Brand (NED); Thalita de Jong (NED); Shara Gillow (AUS); Roxane Knetemann (NED); Katarzyna Niewiadoma (POL); Anna van der Breggen (NED)	+ 56.12"
4	(United Kingdom) Wiggle–Honda	Audrey Cordon (FRA); Jolien D'Hoore (BEL); Annette Edmondson (AUS); Emilia Fahlin (SWE); Dani King (GBR); Elisa Longo Borghini (ITA)	+ 1' 10.15"
5	(United States) Twenty16 p/b Sho-Air	Allie Dragoo (USA); Andrea Dvorak (USA); Lauren Hall (USA); Alison Jackson (CAN); Lauren Komanski (USA); Leah Thomas (USA)	+ 2' 04.88"
6	(United States) UnitedHealthcare (Note: UnitedHealthcare competed with five riders after Lauren Tamayo did not start.)	Laura Brown (CAN); Rushlee Buchanan (NZL); Cari Higgins (CAN); Linda Villumsen (NZL); Ruth Winder (USA)	+ 2' 50.66"
7	(Australia) Orica–AIS	Gracie Elvin (AUS); Katrin Garfoot (AUS); Sarah Roy (AUS); Amanda Spratt (AUS); Macey Stewart (AUS); Lizzie Williams (AUS)	+ 2' 53.71"
8	(Slovenia) BTC City Ljubljana	Polona Batagelj (SLO); Eugenia Bujak (POL); Corinna Lechner (DEU); Olena Pavlukhina (AZE); Urša Pintar (SLO); Martina Ritter (AUT)	+ 3' 02.93"
9	(United States) Optum–Kelly Benefit Strategies (Note: Optum–Kelly Benefit Strategies competed with five riders after Maura Kinsella was injured during the final training session on September 19.)	Amy Charity (USA); Jasmin Glaesser (CAN); Leah Kirchmann (CAN); Alison Tetrick (USA); Brianna Walle (USA)	+ 3' 20.61"
10	(Norway) Team Hitec Products	Charlotte Becker (DEU); Miriam Bjørnsrud (NOR); Tatiana Guderzo (ITA); Cecilie Gotaas Johnsen (NOR); Lauren Kitchen (AUS); Emilie Moberg (NOR)	+ 3' 31.69"
11	(United States) Team TIBCO–SVB	Alizée Brien (CAN); Emily Collins (NZL); Kathrin Hammes (DEU); Joanne Kiesanowski (NZL); Kendall Ryan (USA); Lauren Stephens (USA)	+ 3' 59.10"
12	(United States) Pepper Palace p/b The Happy Tooth	Sarah Caravella (USA); Lauren De Crescenzo (USA); Julie Emmerman (USA); Amy Phillips (USA); Tina Pic (USA); Amber Pierce (USA)	+ 5' 23.07"
13	(United States) BMW p/b Happy Tooth Dental (Note: BMW p/b Happy Tooth Dental competed with five riders after Robin Farina did not start.)	Lindsay Bayer (USA); Kathryn Bertine (SKN); Breanne Nalder (USA); Shoshauna Routley (CAN); Jessica Uebelhart (SUI)	+ 6' 38.02"
