= List of rosters for PABW Powered by TIBCO and its successors =

The List of Tibco–Silicon Valley Bank riders contains riders from the team which have had the names PABW Powered by TIBCO, Team Tibco, Team TIBCO–To The Top, Team TIBCO–SVB and presently, EF Education–Tibco–SVB.

== 2006 (PABW Powered by TIBCO) ==
Ages as of 1 January 2006.

Rider	Date of birth
Julie Adams (USA)	January 1, 1970 (aged 36)
Jamie Crawford (USA)	January 1, 1970 (aged 36)
Tracey Ford (USA)	January 1, 1970 (aged 36)
Erin Hanna (USA)	January 1, 1970 (aged 36)
Amy Mackey (USA)	January 1, 1970 (aged 36)

Rider	Date of birth
Stacy Marple (USA)	January 1, 1971 (aged 35)
Brooke Miller (USA)	March 21, 1976 (aged 29)
Flávia Oliveira (BRA)	October 27, 1981 (aged 24)
Jenni Tafoya (USA)	January 1, 1970 (aged 36)

== 2007 (Team Tibco) ==
Ages as of 1 January 2007.

Rider	Date of birth
Marisa Asplund (USA)	July 14, 1977 (aged 29)
Victoria Bastide (SWE)	May 27, 1976 (aged 30)
Stacy Marple (USA)	January 1, 1971 (aged 36)
Brooke Miller (USA)	March 21, 1976 (aged 30)

Rider	Date of birth
Yukie Nakamura (USA)	December 31, 1972 (aged 34)
Flávia Oliveira (BRA)	October 27, 1981 (aged 25)
Liza Rachetto (USA)	January 30, 1974 (aged 32)

== 2008 (Team Tibco) ==
Ages as of 1 January 2008.

Rider	Date of birth
Victoria Bastide (SWE)	May 27, 1976 (aged 31)
Rushlee Buchanan (NZL)	January 20, 1988 (aged 19)
Rachel Heal (GBR)	April 1, 1973 (aged 34)
Helen Kelly (AUS)	August 7, 1971 (aged 36)
Brooke Miller (USA)	March 21, 1976 (aged 31)

Rider	Date of birth
Amber Pierce (USA)	March 25, 1981 (aged 26)
Liza Rachetto (USA)	January 30, 1974 (aged 33)
Stacy Sims (NZL)	July 24, 1973 (aged 34)
Lauren Tamayo (USA)	October 25, 1983 (aged 24)

== 2009 (Team Tibco) ==
Ages as of 1 January 2009.

Rider	Date of birth
Victoria Bastide (SWE)	May 27, 1976 (aged 32)
Julie Beveridge (CAN)	June 30, 1988 (aged 20)
Rushlee Buchanan (NZL)	January 20, 1988 (aged 20)
Katharine Carroll (USA)	March 9, 1981 (aged 27)
Jerika Hutchinson (USA)	August 30, 1990 (aged 18)
Joanne Kiesanowski (NZL)	May 24, 1979 (aged 29)
Brooke Miller (USA)	March 21, 1976 (aged 32)

Rider	Date of birth
Meredith Miller (USA)	December 26, 1973 (aged 35)
Amber Pierce (USA)	March 25, 1981 (aged 27)
Emma Rickards (AUS)	November 17, 1973 (aged 35)
Stacy Sims (NZL)	July 24, 1973 (aged 35)
Lauren Tamayo (USA)	October 25, 1983 (aged 25)
Tetrick Alison (USA)	April 4, 1985 (aged 23)

== 2010 (Team TIBCO–To The Top) ==
Ages as of 1 January 2010.

Rider	Date of birth
Ruth Corset (AUS)	May 9, 1977 (aged 32)
Devon Gorry (USA)	January 3, 1981 (aged 28)
Megan Guarnier (USA)	May 4, 1985 (aged 24)
Jerika Hutchinson (USA)	August 30, 1990 (aged 19)
Joanne Kiesanowski (NZL)	May 24, 1979 (aged 30)
Kristen Lasasso (USA)	August 19, 1975 (aged 34)
Emma Mackie (AUS)	September 9, 1984 (aged 25)

Rider	Date of birth
Amanda Miller (USA)	December 13, 1986 (aged 23)
Brooke Miller (USA)	March 21, 1976 (aged 33)
Meredith Miller (USA)	December 26, 1973 (aged 36)
Rebecca Much (USA)	February 25, 1986 (aged 23)
Samantha Schneider (USA)	September 18, 1990 (aged 19)
Tetrick Alison (USA)	April 4, 1985 (aged 24)
Lia Winfield (USA)	March 7, 1986 (aged 23)

== 2011 (Team TIBCO–To The Top) ==
Ages as of 1 January 2011.

Rider	Date of birth
Megan Guarnier (USA)	May 4, 1985 (aged 25)
Joanne Kiesanowski (NZL)	May 24, 1979 (aged 31)
Emma Mackie (AUS)	September 9, 1984 (aged 26)
Meredith Miller (USA)	December 26, 1973 (aged 37)
Joëlle Numainville (CAN)	November 20, 1987 (aged 23)
Alison Powers (USA)	December 14, 1979 (aged 31)
Kendall Ryan (USA)	August 10, 1992 (aged 18)

Rider	Date of birth
Samantha Schneider (USA)	September 18, 1990 (aged 20)
Serena Sheridan (NZL)	August 27, 1985 (aged 25)
Carmen Small (USA)	April 20, 1980 (aged 30)
Carlee Taylor (AUS)	February 15, 1989 (aged 21)
Tara Whitten (CAN)	July 13, 1980 (aged 30)
Erinne Willock (CAN)	October 16, 1981 (aged 29)
Lia Winfield (USA)	March 7, 1986 (aged 24)

== 2012 (Team TIBCO–To The Top) ==
Ages as of 1 January 2012.

Rider	Date of birth
Véronique Fortin (CAN)	January 22, 1980 (aged 31)
Megan Guarnier (USA)	May 4, 1985 (aged 26)
Lauren Hall (USA)	February 2, 1979 (aged 32)
Danielle Haulman (USA)	June 5, 1990 (aged 21)
Lauren Hecht (USA)	October 26, 1987 (aged 24)
Joanne Kiesanowski (NZL)	May 24, 1979 (aged 32)
Amanda Miller (USA)	December 13, 1986 (aged 25)
Meredith Miller (USA)	December 26, 1973 (aged 38)

Rider	Date of birth
Lindsay Myers (USA)	November 2, 1989 (aged 22)
Jennifer Purcell (USA)	August 17, 1978 (aged 33)
Heather Ross (USA)	April 13, 1987 (aged 24)
Kendall Ryan (USA)	August 10, 1992 (aged 19)
Samantha Schneider (USA)	September 18, 1990 (aged 21)
Jennifer Wheeler (USA)	September 19, 1980 (aged 31)
Tara Whitten (CAN)	July 13, 1980 (aged 31)

== 2013 (Team TIBCO–To The Top) ==
As of January 2013.

Rider	Date of birth
Victoria Bastide (SWE)	May 27, 1976 (age 50)
Rushlee Buchanan (NZL)	January 20, 1988 (age 38)
Sarah Caravella (USA)	May 31, 1979 (age 47)
Lauren Franges (USA)	October 26, 1983 (age 42)
Claudia Häusler (GER)	November 17, 1985 (age 40)

Rider	Date of birth
Rachel Heal (GBR)	April 1, 1973 (age 53)
Helen Kelly (AUS)	August 7, 1971 (age 55)
Brooke Miller (USA)	March 21, 1976 (age 50)
Amber Rais (USA)	March 25, 1983 (age 43)

== 2014 (Team TIBCO–To The Top) ==
Ages as of 1 January 2014.

Rider	Date of birth
Alizée Brien (CAN)	27 September 1993 (aged 20)
Krista Doebel-Hickok (USA)	28 April 1989 (aged 24)
Andrea Dvorak (USA)	9 October 1980 (aged 33)
Jasmin Glaesser (GER)	8 July 1992 (aged 21)
Emma Grant (GBR)	30 September 1991 (aged 22)
Sara Headley (USA)	5 April 1985 (aged 28)
Joanne Kiesanowski (NZL)	24 May 1979 (aged 34)

Rider	Date of birth
Amanda Miller (USA)	13 December 1986 (aged 27)
Kendall Ryan (USA)	10 August 1992 (aged 21)
Samantha Schneider (USA)	18 September 1990 (aged 23)
Patricia Schwager (SUI)	6 December 1983 (aged 30)
Lauren Stephens (USA)	28 December 1986 (aged 27)
Anika Todd (CAN)	11 March 1990 (aged 23)

== 2015 (Team TIBCO–SVB) ==
As of 10 March 2015. Ages as of 1 January 2015.

Rider	Date of birth
Kathrin Hammes (GER)	January 9, 1989 (aged 25)
Anika Todd (CAN)	March 11, 1990 (aged 24)
Alizée Brien (CAN)	September 27, 1993 (aged 21)
Sara Headley (USA)	April 5, 1985 (aged 29)
Kendall Ryan (USA)	August 10, 1992 (aged 22)
Kristabel Doebel-Hickok (USA)	April 28, 1989 (aged 25)

Rider	Date of birth
Lauren Stephens (USA)	December 28, 1986 (aged 28)
Emily Collins (NZL)	September 16, 1990 (aged 24)
Joanne Kiesanowski (NZL)	May 24, 1979 (aged 35)
Patricia Schwager (SUI)	December 6, 1983 (aged 31)
Joanne Hogan (AUS)	June 9, 1982 (aged 32)

== 2016 (Tibco–Silicon Valley Bank) ==
As of 1 January 2016. Ages as of 1 January 2016.

Rider	Date of birth
Alizée Brien (CAN)	27 September 1993 (aged 22)
Cheryl Clark (USA)	6 September 1986 (aged 29)
Emily Collins (NZL)	16 September 1990 (aged 25)
Lauren Hall (USA)	2 February 1979 (aged 36)
Kathrin Hammes (GER)	9 January 1989 (aged 26)
Joanne Kiesanowski (NZL)	24 May 1979 (aged 36)

Rider	Date of birth
Lauren Komanski (USA)	17 June 1985 (aged 30)
Lindsay Myers (USA)	2 November 1989 (aged 26)
Kendall Ryan (USA)	10 August 1992 (aged 23)
Patricia Schwager (SUI)	6 December 1983 (aged 32)
Lauren Stephens (USA)	28 December 1986 (aged 29)
Brianna Walle (USA)	25 April 1984 (aged 31)

== 2017 (Tibco–Silicon Valley Bank) ==
Ages as of 1 January 2017.

Rider	Date of birth
Lex Albrecht (CAN)	April 6, 1987 (aged 29)
Nicolle Bruderer (GUA)	August 15, 1993 (aged 23)
Katheryn Buss (USA)	October 4, 1993 (aged 23)
Íngrid Drexel (MEX)	July 28, 1993 (aged 23)
Heather Fischer (USA)	November 28, 1988 (aged 28)
Kathrin Hammes (GER)	January 9, 1989 (aged 27)

Rider	Date of birth
Lindsay Myers (USA)	November 2, 1989 (aged 27)
Madeleine Parks (NZL)	September 22, 1998 (aged 18)
Kendall Ryan (USA)	August 10, 1992 (aged 24)
Lauren Stephens (USA)	December 28, 1986 (aged 30)
Jennifer Tetrick (USA)	November 15, 1981 (aged 35)
Brianna Walle (USA)	April 25, 1984 (aged 32)

== 2018 (Tibco–Silicon Valley Bank) ==
Ages as of 1 January 2018.

Rider	Date of birth
Lex Albrecht (CAN)	April 6, 1987 (aged 30)
Nicolle Bruderer (GUA)	August 15, 1993 (aged 24)
Katheryn Buss (USA)	October 4, 1993 (aged 24)
Brodie Chapman (AUS)	April 9, 1991 (aged 26)
Alice Cobb (GBR)	July 31, 1995 (aged 22)
Íngrid Drexel (MEX)	July 28, 1993 (aged 24)
Emma Grant (GBR)	September 30, 1991 (aged 26)

Rider	Date of birth
Alison Jackson (CAN)	December 14, 1988 (aged 29)
Shannon Malseed (AUS)	December 27, 1994 (aged 23)
Emily Newsom (USA)	September 4, 1983 (aged 34)
Kendall Ryan (USA)	August 10, 1992 (aged 25)
Valentina Scandolara (ITA)	May 1, 1990 (aged 27)
Jennifer Tetrick (USA)	November 15, 1981 (aged 36)
Elizabeth Williams (AUS)	August 15, 1983 (aged 34)

== 2019 (Tibco–Silicon Valley Bank) ==
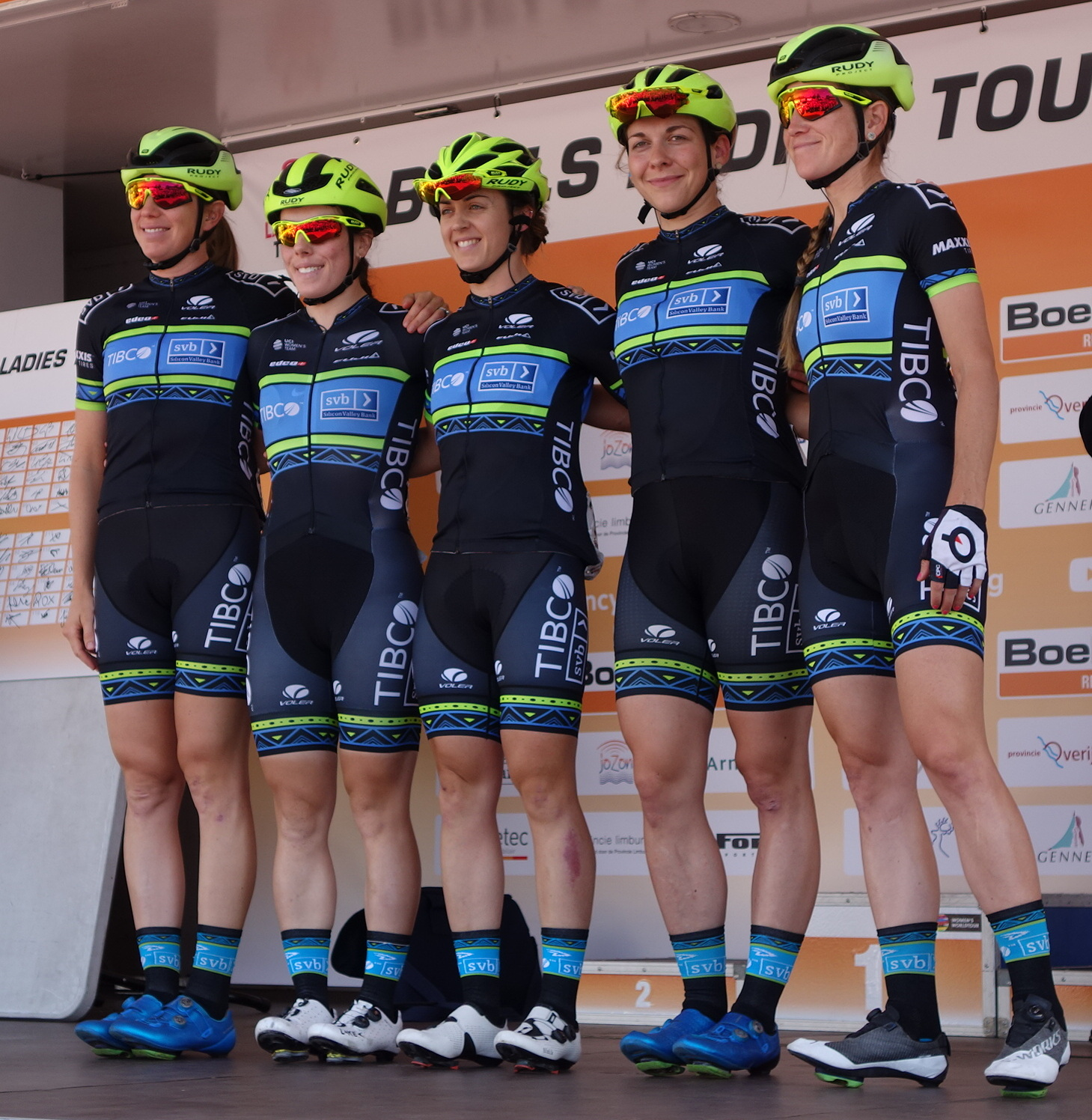
The team in 2019.

As of July 7, 2019.

Rider	Date of birth
Lex Albrecht (CAN)	April 6, 1987 (age 39)
Nicolle Bruderer (GUA)	August 15, 1993 (age 33)
Brodie Chapman (AUS)	April 9, 1991 (age 35)
Alice Cobb (GBR)	July 31, 1995 (age 31)
Íngrid Drexel (MEX)	July 28, 1993 (age 33)
Megan Guarnier (USA)	May 4, 1985 (age 41)
Alison Jackson (CAN)	December 14, 1988 (age 37)
Nina Kessler (NED)	July 4, 1988 (age 38)

Rider	Date of birth
Sharlotte Lucas (NZL)	July 25, 1991 (age 35)
Shannon Malseed (AUS)	December 27, 1994 (age 31)
Emily Marcolini (CAN)	November 12, 1995 (age 30)
Emily Newsom (USA)	September 4, 1983 (age 43)
Kendall Ryan (USA)	August 10, 1992 (age 34)
Rozanne Slik (NED)	April 12, 1991 (age 35)
Lauren Stephens (USA)	December 28, 1986 (age 39)

== 2020 (Tibco–Silicon Valley Bank) ==
Ages as of 1 January 2020.

Rider	Date of birth
Nicolle Bruderer (GUA)	August 15, 1993 (aged 26)
Erica Clevenger (USA)	May 1, 1994 (aged 25)
Jenelle Crooks (AUS)	July 2, 1994 (aged 25)
Leah Dixon (GBR)	August 26, 1991 (aged 28)
Kristen Faulkner (USA)	December 18, 1992 (aged 27)
Sarah Gigante (AUS)	October 6, 2000 (aged 19)
Nina Kessler (NED)	July 4, 1988 (aged 31)

Rider	Date of birth
Sharlotte Lucas (NZL)	July 25, 1991 (aged 28)
Shannon Malseed (AUS)	December 27, 1994 (aged 25)
Emily Newsom (USA)	September 4, 1983 (aged 36)
Diana Penuela (COL)	September 8, 1986 (aged 33)
Kendall Ryan (USA)	August 10, 1992 (aged 27)
Lauren Stephens (USA)	December 28, 1986 (aged 33)

== 2021 (Tibco–Silicon Valley Bank) ==
Ages as at 1 January 2021.

Rider	Date of birth
Eva Buurman (NED)	September 7, 1994 (aged 26)
Leah Dixon (GBR)	August 26, 1991 (aged 29)
Tanja Erath (GER)	October 7, 1989 (aged 31)
Kristen Faulkner (USA)	December 18, 1992 (aged 28)
Sarah Gigante (AUS)	October 6, 2000 (aged 20)
Clara Honsinger (USA)	June 5, 1997 (aged 23)
Nina Kessler (NED)	July 4, 1988 (aged 32)

Rider	Date of birth
Emma Langley (USA)	November 23, 1995 (aged 25)
Emily Newsom (USA)	September 4, 1983 (aged 37)
Diana Peñuela (COL)	September 8, 1986 (aged 34)
Lauren Stephens (USA)	December 28, 1986 (aged 34)
Maddy Ward (USA)	July 25, 1994 (aged 26)
Eri Yonamine (JPN)	April 25, 1991 (aged 29)

== 2023 (EF Education–TIBCO–SVB) ==
As of February 27, 2023.

Rider	Date of birth
Zoe Bäckstedt (GBR)	September 24, 2004 (age 22)
Lizzy Banks (GBR)	November 7, 1990 (age 35)
Letizia Borghesi (ITA)	October 16, 1998 (age 28)
Krista Doebel-Hickok (USA)	April 28, 1989 (age 37)
Veronica Ewers (USA)	September 1, 1994 (age 32)
Kathrin Hammes (GER)	January 9, 1989 (age 37)
Clara Honsinger (USA)	June 5, 1997 (age 29)

Rider	Date of birth
Alison Jackson (CAN)	December 14, 1988 (age 37)
Emma Langley (USA)	November 23, 1995 (age 30)
Sara Poidevin (CAN)	May 7, 1996 (age 30)
Omer Shapira (ISR)	September 9, 1994 (age 32)
Lauren Stephens (USA)	December 28, 1986 (age 39)
Georgia Williams (NZL)	August 25, 1993 (age 33)

== See also ==
- EF Education–Tibco–SVB
