= 2015 Tour of California (women's race) =

Race details
- Dates: May 8–10
- Stages: 3
- Distance: 254.2 km (158.0 mi)
- Winning time: 6 h 24 min 16 s

Results
Jersey awarded to the overall winner	Winner	Trixi Worrack (GER)	(Velocio–SRAM)
	Second	Leah Kirchmann (CAN)	(Optum–KBS)
	Third	Lauren Komanski (USA)	(Twenty16 p/b Sho-Air)
Jersey awarded to the points classification winner	Points	Leah Kirchmann (CAN)	(Optum–KBS)
Jersey awarded to the mountains classification winner	Mountains	Kirsti Lay (CAN)	(Canada national team)
Jersey awarded to the youth classification winner	Youth	Hannah Barnes (GBR)	(UnitedHealthcare)
	Team	Twenty16 p/b Sho-Air	

The 2015 Amgen Tour of California Women's Race p/b SRAM was the first edition of the Tour of California women's race, held between 8 and 10 May in California, with a UCI rating of 2.1.

== Teams ==
Fourteen teams were announced for the race in February 2015.

=== UCI women's teams ===
- Alé–Cipollini
- BMW p/b Happy Tooth Dental
- Itau Shimano Ladies Power Team
- Optum–KBS
- Pepper Palace p/b The Happy Tooth
- Team TIBCO–SVB
- Twenty16 p/b Sho-Air
- UnitedHealthcare
- Velocio–SRAM
- Xirayas de San Luis

=== Elite teams ===
- Pearl Izumi–Boot Out Breast Cancer
- Colavita–Fine Cooking
- UAEM-G Pro Cycling Team

=== National team ===
- Canada

== Stages ==
=== Stage 1 ===
May 8, 2015 — South Lake Tahoe to Heavenly Mountain Resort, 119 km (74 mi)

Stage 1 result and General classification after stage 1
Rank	Rider	Team	Time
1	Katie Hall (USA)	UnitedHealthcare	3h 10' 49"
2	Alena Amialiusik (BLR)	Velocio–SRAM	+ 2"
3	Lauren Komanski (USA)	Twenty16 p/b Sho-Air	+ 2"
4	Trixi Worrack (GER)	Velocio–SRAM	+ 4"
5	Flávia Oliveira (BRA)	Alé–Cipollini	+ 11"
6	Alison Jackson (CAN)	Twenty16 p/b Sho-Air	+ 14"
7	Andrea Dvorak (USA)	Twenty16 p/b Sho-Air	+ 14"
8	Leah Kirchmann (CAN)	Optum–KBS	+ 18"
9	Lauren Stephens (USA)	Team TIBCO–SVB	+ 22"
10	Lex Albrecht (CAN)	Optum–KBS	+ 27"

=== Stage 2 ===
May 9, 2015 — South Lake Tahoe to Heavenly Mountain Resort, 80.5 km (50 mi)

Stage 2 result
Rank	Rider	Team	Time
1	Leah Kirchmann (CAN)	Optum–KBS	1h 57' 33"
2	Lauren Komanski (USA)	Twenty16 p/b Sho-Air	+ 0"
3	Trixi Worrack (GER)	Velocio–SRAM	+ 0"
4	Katie Hall (USA)	UnitedHealthcare	+ 6"
5	Lauren Stephens (USA)	Team TIBCO–SVB	+ 10"
6	Flávia Oliveira (BRA)	Alé–Cipollini	+ 14"
7	Alena Amialiusik (BLR)	Velocio–SRAM	+ 14"
8	Lex Albrecht (CAN)	Optum–KBS	+ 17"
9	Alison Jackson (CAN)	Twenty16 p/b Sho-Air	+ 19"
10	Kathrin Hammes (GER)	Team TIBCO–SVB	+ 28"

General classification after stage 2
Rank	Rider	Team	Time
1	Lauren Komanski (USA)	Twenty16 p/b Sho-Air	5h 08' 18"
2	Trixi Worrack (GER)	Velocio–SRAM	+ 3"
3	Katie Hall (USA)	UnitedHealthcare	+ 10"
4	Leah Kirchmann (CAN)	Optum–KBS	+ 12"
5	Alena Amialiusik (BLR)	Velocio–SRAM	+ 20"
6	Flávia Oliveira (BRA)	Alé–Cipollini	+ 29"
7	Lauren Stephens (USA)	Team TIBCO–SVB	+ 36"
8	Alison Jackson (CAN)	Twenty16 p/b Sho-Air	+ 37"
9	Lex Albrecht (CAN)	Optum–KBS	+ 48"
10	Andrea Dvorak (USA)	Twenty16 p/b Sho-Air	+ 57"

=== Stage 3 ===
May 10, 2015 — Sacramento to Sacramento, 54.7 km (34 mi)

Stage 3 result
Rank	Rider	Team	Time
1	Leah Kirchmann (CAN)	Optum–KBS	1h 16' 04"
2	Hannah Barnes (GBR)	UnitedHealthcare	+ 0"
3	Erica Allar (USA)	Colavita–Fine Cooking	+ 0"
4	Trixi Worrack (GER)	Velocio–SRAM	+ 0"
5	Emily Collins (NZL)	Team TIBCO–SVB	+ 0"
6	Lauren Komanski (USA)	Twenty16 p/b Sho-Air	+ 0"
7	Jessica Uebelhart (SUI)	BMW p/b Happy Tooth Dental	+ 0"
8	Alexis Ryan (USA)	UnitedHealthcare	+ 0"
9	Ana Teresa Casas (MEX)	UAEM-G Pro Cycling Team	+ 0"
10	Liza Rachetto (USA)	BMW p/b Happy Tooth Dental	+ 0"

Final general classification
Rank	Rider	Team	Time
1	Trixi Worrack (GER)	Velocio–SRAM	6h 24' 16"
2	Leah Kirchmann (CAN)	Optum–KBS	+ 5"
3	Lauren Komanski (USA)	Twenty16 p/b Sho-Air	+ 6"
4	Katie Hall (USA)	UnitedHealthcare	+ 16"
5	Alena Amialiusik (BLR)	Velocio–SRAM	+ 26"
6	Flávia Oliveira (BRA)	Alé–Cipollini	+ 35"
7	Alison Jackson (CAN)	Twenty16 p/b Sho-Air	+ 41"
8	Lauren Stephens (USA)	Team TIBCO–SVB	+ 42"
9	Lex Albrecht (CAN)	Optum–KBS	+ 54"
10	Andrea Dvorak (USA)	Twenty16 p/b Sho-Air	+ 1' 03"

== Classification leadership ==
Stage	Winner	General classification	Young rider classification	Mountains classification	Sprints classification	Teams classification
1	Katie Hall	Katie Hall	Hannah Barnes	Sarah Storey	Allison Beveridge	Twenty16 p/b Sho-Air
2	Leah Kirchmann	Lauren Komanski	Hannah Barnes	Kirsti Lay	Leah Kirchmann	Twenty16 p/b Sho-Air
3	Leah Kirchmann	Trixi Worrack	Hannah Barnes	Kirsti Lay	Leah Kirchmann	Twenty16 p/b Sho-Air
Final		Trixi Worrack	Hannah Barnes	Kirsti Lay	Leah Kirchmann	Twenty16 p/b Sho-Air
