= Pasta Zara–Cogeas =

Former professional cycling team based in Lithuania

Team information
- UCI code: 2000–2003: ADO; 2004–2010: SAF; 2011–2012: DPZ; 2013- : PZC
- Registered: Lithuania; Italy
- Founded: 1996
- Discipline: Road
- Status: UCI Women's Team
- Bicycles: Fuji

Team name history
- 1996–1997 1998–2001 2002–2003 2004–2008 2009 2010 2011–2012 2013: Acca Due O Acca Due O–Lorena Camicie; Acca Due O–Pasta Zara–Lorena Camicie; Safi–Pasta Zara–Manhattan; Safi–Pasta Zara–Titanedi; Safi–Pasta Zara; Diadora–Pasta Zara; Pasta Zara–Cogeas

Pasta Zara–Cogeas (UCI team code: PZC) is a former professional cycling team based in Lithuania, which was competing in elite road bicycle racing events such as the UCI Women's Road World Cup.

== Major wins ==
1998
Russia Time Trial Championship, Zoulfia Zabirova
Trophée International de Saint-Amand-Mont-Rond, Alessandra Cappellotto
Overall Grande Boucle Féminine Internationale, Edita Pučinskaitė
Lithuania Time Trial Championship, Edita Pučinskaitė
Embrach, Zoulfia Zabirova
1999
Primavera Rosa, Sara Felloni
Berner Rundfahrt, Marion Brauen
UCI Track Cycling World Cup – Cali (Individual pursuit), Marion Clignet
UCI Track Cycling World Cup – Cali (Points race), Marion Clignet
Overall Grande Boucle Féminine Internationale, Diana Žiliūtė
World Road Race Championship, Edita Pučinskaitė
2000
Primavera Rosa, Diana Žiliūtė
Route Féminine Du Vignoble Nantais, Marion Clignet
Le Critérium International Féminin De Lachine, Diana Žiliūtė
Russia Time Trial Championship, Zoulfia Zabirova
GP Ouest France, Diana Žiliūtė
2001
Berner Rundfahrt, Vera Hohlfeld
Nieuw–Lekkerland, Arenda Grimberg
Switzerland Time Trial Championship, Priska Doppmann
Stages 3 & 5 Tour de Bretagne, Arenda Grimberg
Westerbeek, Mirjam Melchers-van Poppel
World Road Race Championship, Rasa Polikevičiūtė
2002
Overall Vuelta Castilla y Leon, Nicole Brändli
Lithuania Road Race Championship, Zita Urbonaitė
Switzerland Road Race Championship, Nicole Brändli
Stage 9 Grande Boucle Féminine Internationale, Nicole Brändli
2003
Stage 3 Damesronde van Drenthe, Ghita Beltman
Trofeo Alfredo Binda – Comune di Cittiglio, Diana Žiliūtė
Stage 3 Tour du Grand Montréal, Diana Žiliūtė
Lithuania Road Race Championship, Diana Žiliūtė
Steenwijk, Chantal Beltman
Gouden Pijl, Chantal Beltman
Rund um die Nürnberger Altstadt, Diana Žiliūtė
Stages 1, 2 & 7 Holland Ladies Tour, Diana Žiliūtė
Rotterdam Tour, Chantal Beltman
2004
Stage 1 Vuelta a Castilla y León, Regina Schleicher
Stage 1 Novilon Eurocup Ronde van Drenthe, Giorgia Bronzini
Stage 3 Giro del Trentino Alto Adige-Südtirol, Regina Schleicher
Lithuania Time Trial Championship, Diana Žiliūtė
Lithuania Road Race Championship, Diana Žiliūtė
United Kingdom Road Championship, Nicole Cooke
Overall Giro d'Italia Femminile, Nicole Cooke

Prologue & Stage 6, Diana Žiliūtė
Stage 3, Regina Schleicher
Stage 8, Nicole Cooke

Stage 2 International Thüringen Rundfahrt der Frauen, Modesta Vžesniauskaitė
Stage 3 Boels Ladies Tour, Regina Schleicher
Stage 6 Boels Ladies Tour, Giorgia Bronzini
Stage 1a Giro della Toscana, Nicole Cooke
2005
Trofeo Alfredo Binda, Nicole Cooke
GP Costa Etrusca, Nicole Cooke
Grand Prix de Dottignies, Nicole Cooke
Geelong – Women's World Cup, Rochelle Gilmore
Giro Frazioni, Nicole Cooke
GP de Wallonie, Nicole Cooke
La Flèche Wallonne, Nicole Cooke
United Kingdom Road Championship, Nicole Cooke
Japan Time Trial Championship, Miyoko Karami
Stage 5 Boels Ladies Tour, Nicole Cooke
Stahe 1a Giro della Toscana Femminile, Nicole Cooke
2006
Stage 2 Geelong Tour, Rochelle Gilmore
GP Liberazione, Diana Žiliūtė
Prologue & Stage 1 Giro di San Marino, Diana Žiliūtė
Lithuania Road Race Championship, Diana Žiliūtė
Stage 3 International Thüringen Rundfahrt der Frauen, Veronica Andrèasson
Prologue & Stages 1, 5, 6 & 7 Route de France Féminine, Diana Žiliūtė
2007
Grand Prix de Dottignies, Giorgia Bronzini
Novilon Eurocup Ronde van Drenthe, Giorgia Bronzini
GP Liberazione, Giorgia Bronzini
Overall Tour de Prince Edward Island, Diana Žiliūtė

Stage 2, Diana Žiliūtė
Stages 3 & 5, Giorgia Bronzini

Italy Time Trial Championship, Vera Carrara
Stage 1 Giro d'Italia Femminile, Giorgia Bronzini
Stages 3 & 6 Trophée d'Or Féminin, Giorgia Bronzini
Stage 1 Tour Cycliste Féminin International Ardèche, Diana Žiliūtė
Stage 4a Giro della Toscana Femminile, Giorgia Bronzini
Stage 4b Giro della Toscana Femminile, Diana Žiliūtė
World Road Championship, Marta Bastianelli
2008
Stages 1, 3 & 4 Grande Boucle féminine, Diana Žiliūtė
GP Carnevale d'Europa, Diana Žiliūtė
Stage 6 Trophée d'Or Féminin, Eneritz Iturriagaechevarria
Stages 3 & 5 Tour Cycliste Féminin International Ardèche, Diana Žiliūtė
2009
Stages 1 & 3 Ladies Tour of Qatar, Giorgia Bronzini
GP Liberazione, Giorgia Bronzini
Stages 1, 3 & 4 Tour de Prince Edward Island, Giorgia Bronzini
Lithuania Time Trial Championship, Diana Žiliūtė
Lithuania Road Race Championship, Rasa Leleivytė
GP Carnevale d'Europa, Giorgia Bronzini
Prologue Route de France Féminine, Diana Žiliūtė
Overall Trophée d'Or Féminin, Diana Žiliūtė

Prologue & Stages 2, 3 & 6, Diana Žiliūtė

Overall Giro della Toscana Femminile, Diana Žiliūtė

Stage 2, Giorgia Bronzini

2010
Stage 1 Ladies Tour of Qatar, Rasa Leleivytė
GP Comune di Cornaredo, Rasa Leleivytė
Stage 3 Giro del Trentino Alto Adige-Südtirol, Eleonora Patuzzo
Lithuania Road Championship, Aušrinė Trebaitė
Overall International Thüringen Rundfahrt der Frauen, Olga Zabelinskaya
Stage 1 Trophée d'Or Féminin, Alyona Andruk
Stage 2a Trophée d'Or Féminin, Inga Čilvinaitė
Stage 3 Trophée d'Or Féminin, Rasa Leleivytė
2011
Stage 4 Women's Tour of New Zealand, Alyona Andruk
GP Costa Etrusca III, Shelley Olds
2012
Italy Road Championship, Giada Borgato
Stage 1 Tour de Free State, Alyona Andruk
Lithuania Road Championship, Inga Čilvinaitė
Stage 4, 5, & 6 Trophée d'Or Féminin, Giorgia Bronzini
Stage 1 & 4 Giro della Toscana Femminile, Giorgia Bronzini
Stage 3 Giro della Toscana Femminile, Inga Čilvinaitė
2013
Overall Vuelta Ciclista Femenina a Costa Rica, Inga Čilvinaitė

Stage 1, Evelyn García
Stages 2 & 4, Inga Čilvinaitė
Stage 3, Edita Janeliūnaitė
Stage 5, Addyson Albershardt

Stage 5, Vuelta El Salvador, Addyson Albershardt
Panamerican Championships (ITT), Íngrid Drexel
Mexico National Time Trial Championships, Íngrid Drexel

== National champions ==
2004
Lithuanian Time Trial Championship, Diana Žiliūtė
Lithuanian Road Championship, Diana Žiliūtė
British Road Championship, Nicole Cooke
2005
British Road Championship, Nicole Cooke
Japanese Time Trial Championship, Miyoko Karami
2006
Lithuanian Road Championship, Diana Žiliūtė
2007
Italian Time Trial Championship, Vera Carrara
World Road Championship, Marta Bastianelli
2009
Lithuanian Time Trial Championship, Diana Žiliūtė
Lithuanian Road Championship, Rasa Leleivytė
2010
Lithuanian Road Championship, Aušrinė Trebaitė
2012
Italian Road Championship, Giada Borgato
Lithuanian Road Championship, Inga Čilvinaitė
2013
Mexico Time Trial Championships, Íngrid Drexel

== Team rosters ==
=== 2013 ===
As of 12 July 2013.

Rider	Date of birth
Addyson Albershardt (USA)	20 August 1994 (age 32)
Giada Borgato (ITA)	15 June 1989 (age 37)
Rossella Callovi (ITA)	5 April 1991 (age 35)
Inga Čilvinaitė (LTU)	14 February 1986 (age 40)
Íngrid Drexel (MEX)	28 July 1993 (age 33)
Véronique Fortin (CAN)	20 January 1980 (age 46)
Evelyn García (ESA)	29 December 1982 (age 43)

Rider	Date of birth
Edita Janeliūnaitė (LTU)	16 December 1988 (age 37)
Silvija Latožaitė (LTU)	20 November 1993 (age 32)
Amber Neben (USA)	18 February 1975 (age 51)
Amber Pierce (USA)	25 March 1981 (age 45)
Martina Růžičková (CZE)	22 March 1980 (age 46)
Agnė Šilinytė (LTU)	12 April 1991 (age 35)
Lorena María Vargas Villamil (COL)	27 July 1986 (age 40)

=== 2012 ===
Ages as of 1 January 2012.

Rider	Date of birth
Giada Borgato (ITA)	June 15, 1989 (aged 22)
Giorgia Bronzini (ITA)	August 3, 1983 (aged 28)
Rossella Callovi (ITA)	April 5, 1991 (aged 20)
Inga Čilvinaitė (LTU)	February 14, 1986 (aged 25)
Alessandra D'Ettorre (ITA)	May 8, 1978 (aged 33)

Rider	Date of birth
Edita Janeliūnaitė (LTU)	December 16, 1988 (aged 23)
Amber Pierce (USA)	March 25, 1981 (aged 30)
Agnė Šilinytė (LTU)	April 12, 1991 (aged 20)
Francesca Stefani (ITA)	January 25, 1991 (aged 20)
Alice Tagliapietra (ITA)	March 8, 1993 (aged 18)

=== 2011 ===
Ages as of 1 January 2011.

Rider	Date of birth
Mara Abbott (USA)	November 14, 1985 (aged 25)
Alyona Andruk (UKR)	June 11, 1987 (aged 23)
Inga Čilvinaitė (LTU)	February 14, 1986 (aged 24)
Giulia Donato (ITA)	September 26, 1992 (aged 18)
Oxana Kozonchuk (RUS)	May 28, 1988 (aged 22)
Claudia Lichtenberg (GER)	November 17, 1985 (aged 25)
Sinead Miller (USA)	June 9, 1990 (aged 20)

Rider	Date of birth
Rachel Neylan (AUS)	March 9, 1982 (aged 28)
Shelley Olds (USA)	September 30, 1980 (aged 30)
Eleonora Patuzzo (ITA)	October 16, 1989 (aged 21)
Amber Pierce (USA)	March 25, 1981 (aged 29)
Francesca Stefani (ITA)	January 25, 1991 (aged 19)
Jessica Uebelhart (SUI)	October 16, 1990 (aged 20)
Olga Zabelinskaya (RUS)	May 10, 1980 (aged 30)
