= 2018 Tour of California (women's race) =

2018 Amgen Tour of California Women's Race
2018 UCI Women's World Tour, race 11 of 24

Race details
- Dates: 17–19 May 2018
- Stages: 3
- Distance: 301.5 km (187.3 mi)

Results
	Winner	Katie Hall (USA)	(UnitedHealthcare)
	Second	Tayler Wiles (USA)	(Trek–Drops)
	Third	Kasia Niewiadoma (POL)	(Canyon//SRAM)

The fourth running of the Women's Tour of California (officially: Amgen Tour of California Women's Race empowered with SRAM) was held from 17 to 19 May 2018. American Katie Hall won the race. Tayler Wiles was second, Kasia Niewiadoma third.

It was the 11th race of the 2018 UCI Women's World Tour. Raced over three stages, it covered a total distance of 301.5 km. Due to an overlap on the World Tour calendar with the Euskal Bira in Spain, defending champion Anna van der Breggen was not present in this year's event.

== Teams ==
Due to the overlap with the Euskal Bira, a number of World Tour Teams were absent in the race, including Boels–Dolmans, Mitchelton–BikeExchange, FDJ Nouvelle-Aquitaine Futuroscope, Alé–Cipollini, Cervélo–Bigla Pro Cycling, BTC City Ljubljana and WaowDeals Pro Cycling. Fifteen teams participated in the race. Each team had a maximum of six riders:

Professional women's teams

- UnitedHealthcare
- Astana
- Team Sunweb
- Wiggle High5
- Canyon//SRAM
- Tibco–Silicon Valley Bank
- Trek–Drops
- Twenty20 p/b Sho-Air
- Team Illuminate
- Rally Cycling
- Hagens Berman–Supermint
- Swapit–Agolíco
- Bepink

National teams

- United States of America
- Mexico

== Schedule ==
List of stages
Stage	Date	Course	Distance	Type	Winner
1	17 May	Elk Grove to Elk Grove	123.5 km (76.7 mi)	Flat stage	Kendall Ryan (USA)
2	18 May	South Lake Tahoe to South Lake Tahoe	108 km (67.1 mi)	Mountain stage	Katie Hall (USA)
3	19 May	Sacramento to Sacramento	70 km (43.5 mi)	Flat stage	Arlenis Sierra (CUB)
Total			301.5 km (187.3 mi)		

== Classification leadership table ==
In the Tour of California, five different jerseys were awarded. For the general classification, calculated by adding each cyclist's finishing times on each stage, and allowing time bonuses for the first three finishers at intermediate sprints and at the finish of mass-start stages, the leader received a yellow jersey. This classification was considered the most important of the 2017 Tour of California, and the winner of the classification was considered the winner of the race.

Additionally, there was a sprints classification, which awarded a green jersey. In the sprints classification, cyclists received points for finishing in the top 10 in a stage. For winning a stage, a rider earned 15 points, with 12 for second, 9 for third, 7 for fourth with a point fewer per place down to a single point for 10th place. Points towards the classification could also be accrued – awarded on a 3–2–1 scale – at intermediate sprint points during each stage; these intermediate sprints also offered bonus seconds towards the general classification. There was also a mountains classification, the leadership of which was marked by a white jersey with red polka dots. In the mountains classification, points were won by reaching the top of a climb before other cyclists, with more points available for the higher-categorised climbs.

The fourth jersey represented the young rider classification, marked by a predominantly "white design" jersey. This was decided in the same way as the general classification, but only riders born after 1 January 1992 were eligible to be ranked in the classification. There was also a classification for teams, in which the times of the best three cyclists per team on each stage were added together; the leading team at the end of the race was the team with the lowest total time. In addition, there was a combativity award given after each stage to the rider considered, by a jury, to have "who best exemplifies the character of those engaged in the fight against cancer / heart disease", in line with the jersey's sponsors. This award was marked by a blue jersey.

Stage	Winner	General classification	Sprints classification	Mountains classification	Young rider classification	Most courageous rider	Team classification
1	Kendall Ryan	Kendall Ryan	Kendall Ryan	Not awarded	Emma White	Whitney Allison	Team Sunweb
2	Katie Hall	Katie Hall	Katie Hall	Katie Hall	Sara Poidevin	Lily Williams	UnitedHealthcare
3	Arlenis Sierra	Katie Hall	Emma White	Katie Hall	Sara Poidevin	Liane Lippert	UnitedHealthcare
Final		Katie Hall	Emma White	Katie Hall	Sara Poidevin	Not awarded	UnitedHealthcare
