= Tour of California (women's race) =

American multi-day road cycling race

Race details
- Date: May
- Region: California, United States
- Discipline: Road
- Competition: UCI Women's World Tour (since 2016)
- Type: Stage race
- Organiser: Anschutz Entertainment Group
- Web site: www.amgentourofcalifornia.com

History
- First edition: 2015
- Editions: 5 (as of 2019)
- First winner: Trixi Worrack (GER)
- Most wins: Anna van der Breggen (NED) (2 times)
- Most recent: Anna van der Breggen (NED)

The Women's Tour of California is the women's event of the Tour of California, an annual road bicycle racing event in California, United States. Raced over four stages, the event usually finishes with a criterium stage in Sacramento. It is organized by Anschutz Entertainment Group and part of the UCI Women's World Tour. Dutch rider and 2016 Olympic road race champion Anna van der Breggen won the race twice, in 2017, and 2019.

== Winners ==
Year	1st	2nd	3rd
2015	(Germany) Trixi Worrack; Velocio–SRAM	(Canada) Leah Kirchmann; Optum–KBS	(United States) Lauren Komanski; Twenty16 p/b Sho-Air
2016	(United States) Megan Guarnier; Boels–Dolmans	(United States) Kristin Armstrong; Twenty16–Ridebiker	(United States) Evelyn Stevens; Boels–Dolmans
2017	(Netherlands) Anna van der Breggen; Boels–Dolmans	(United States) Katie Hall; UnitedHealthcare	(Cuba) Arlenis Sierra; Astana
2018	(United States) Katie Hall; UnitedHealthcare	(United States) Tayler Wiles; Trek–Drops	(Poland) Katarzyna Niewiadoma; Canyon//SRAM
2019	(Netherlands) Anna van der Breggen; Boels–Dolmans	(United States) Katie Hall; Boels–Dolmans	(South Africa) Ashleigh Moolman Pasio; CCC - Liv
