= Shoshauna Routley =

Canadian cyclist

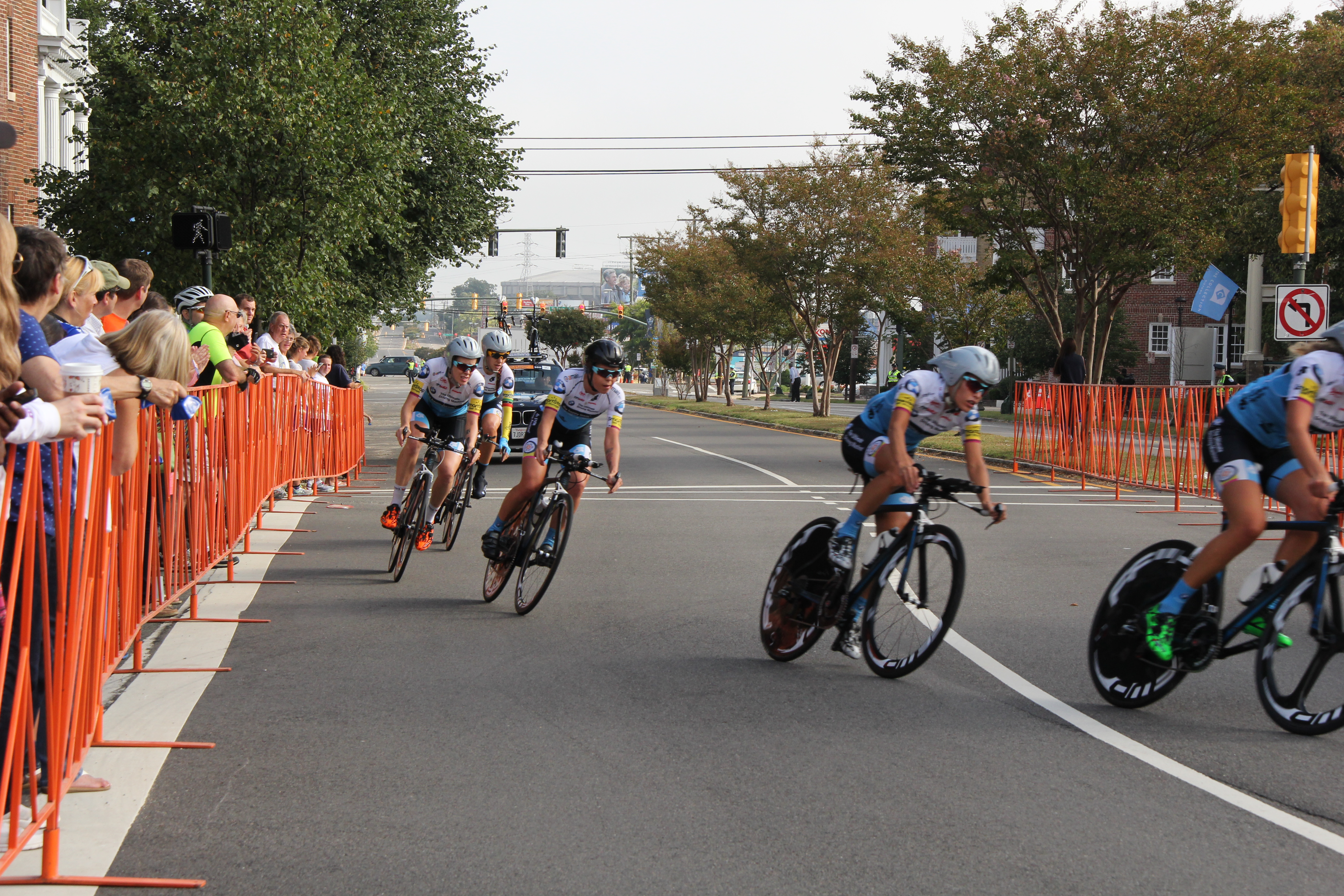
- Riding with her team at the 2015 UCI Road World Championships

Personal information
- Born: 20 October 1986 (age 39) Texas

Cycling career
- Sport: Cycling
- Current team: Retired
- Discipline: Road
- Role: Rider

Professional teams
- Hagens Berman–Supermint (2016)
- BMW p/b Happy Tooth Dental (2015)

Shoshauna Routley (born 20 October 1986) is a Canadian professional racing cyclist. She rode in the women's team time trial at the 2015 UCI Road World Championships. Towards the end of 2015 Routley joined the Hagens Berman–Supermint team.

Shoshauna is married to Will Routley, retired men's pro cyclist last with the Rally Cycling Team in 2016.
