= 2017 Tour of California (women's race) =

2017 Amgen Tour of California Women's Race
2017 UCI Women's World Tour, race 10 of 20

Race details
- Dates: 11–14 May 2017
- Stages: 4
- Distance: 413 km (256.6 mi)
- Winning time: 10h 47' 33"

Results
Jersey awarded to the overall winner	Winner	Anna van der Breggen (NED)	(Boels–Dolmans)
	Second	Katie Hall (USA)	(UnitedHealthcare)
	Third	Arlenis Sierra (CUB)	(Astana)
Jersey awarded to the mountains classification winner	Mountains	Katie Hall (USA)	(UnitedHealthcare)
Jersey awarded to the youth classification winner	Youth	Arlenis Sierra (CUB)	(Astana)
Jersey awarded to the sprints classification winner	Sprints	Arlenis Sierra (CUB)	(Astana)
	Team	UnitedHealthcare	

The 2017 Amgen Tour of California Women's Race (also known as the Amgen Breakaway from Heart Disease Women's Race empowered with SRAM for sponsorship reasons) was the third edition of the women's Tour of California cycling stage race. It ran from 11 to 14 May 2017, and was part of the 2017 UCI Women's World Tour; the race started in South Lake Tahoe and finished in Sacramento.

The race was won on the final day by Boels–Dolmans rider Anna van der Breggen, surpassing UnitedHealthcare's Katie Hall thanks to bonus seconds won at an intermediate sprint. As a result, van der Breggen took the lead of the Women's World Tour standings.

== Teams ==
17 teams participated in the 2017 Tour of California; 16 teams announced in March 2017, with further amendments made to the field in the week leading up to the race.

Competing teams

- Astana
- Boels–Dolmans
- Canyon//SRAM
- Colavita/Bianchi
- Cylance Pro Cycling
- Drops
- Hagens Berman–Supermint
- Team Illuminate
- Lares–Waowdeals
- Rally Cycling
- Sho-Air Twenty20
- Team Sunweb
- Tibco–Silicon Valley Bank
- UnitedHealthcare
- Visit Dallas DNA Pro Cycling
- Wiggle High5
- United States

== Schedule ==
The full race route was announced on 31 January 2017.

List of stages
Stage	Date	Course	Distance	Type	Winner
1	11 May	South Lake Tahoe to South Lake Tahoe	117.0 km (72.7 mi)	Flat stage	Megan Guarnier (USA)
2	12 May	South Lake Tahoe to South Lake Tahoe	108 km (67.1 mi)	Hilly stage	Katie Hall (USA)
3	13 May	Elk Grove to Sacramento	118.0 km (73.3 mi)	Flat stage	Coryn Rivera (USA)
4	14 May	Sacramento to Sacramento	70 km (43.5 mi)	Flat stage	Giorgia Bronzini (ITA)
Total			413 km (256.6 mi)		

== Stages ==
=== Stage 1 ===
11 May 2017 — South Lake Tahoe to South Lake Tahoe, 117 km (72.7 mi)

Stage 1 result
Rank	Rider	Team	Time
1	Megan Guarnier (USA)	Boels–Dolmans	3h 03' 48"
2	Anna van der Breggen (NED)	Boels–Dolmans	+ 4"
3	Arlenis Sierra (CUB)	Astana	+ 7"
4	Ruth Winder (USA)	UnitedHealthcare	+ 10"
5	Kristabel Doebel-Hickok (USA)	Cylance Pro Cycling	+ 10"
6	Lauren Stephens (USA)	Tibco–Silicon Valley Bank	+ 14"
7	Lex Albrecht (CAN)	Tibco–Silicon Valley Bank	+ 17"
8	Coryn Rivera (USA)	Team Sunweb	+ 20"
9	Katie Hall (USA)	UnitedHealthcare	+ 20"
10	Alena Amialiusik (BLR)	Canyon//SRAM	+ 22"

General classification after Stage 1
Rank	Rider	Team	Time
1	Megan Guarnier (USA)	Boels–Dolmans	3h 03' 38"
2	Anna van der Breggen (NED)	Boels–Dolmans	+ 8"
3	Arlenis Sierra (CUB)	Astana	+ 11"
4	Ruth Winder (USA)	UnitedHealthcare	+ 20"
5	Kristabel Doebel-Hickok (USA)	Cylance Pro Cycling	+ 20"
6	Lauren Stephens (USA)	Tibco–Silicon Valley Bank	+ 24"
7	Lex Albrecht (CAN)	Tibco–Silicon Valley Bank	+ 27"
8	Coryn Rivera (USA)	Team Sunweb	+ 30"
9	Katie Hall (USA)	UnitedHealthcare	+ 30"
10	Alena Amialiusik (BLR)	Canyon//SRAM	+ 32"

=== Stage 2 ===
12 May 2017 — South Lake Tahoe to South Lake Tahoe, 108 km (67.1 mi)

Stage 2 result
Rank	Rider	Team	Time
1	Katie Hall (USA)	UnitedHealthcare	3h 09' 56"
2	Anna van der Breggen (NED)	Boels–Dolmans	+ 21"
3	Kristabel Doebel-Hickok (USA)	Cylance Pro Cycling	+ 37"
4	Ruth Winder (USA)	UnitedHealthcare	+ 37"
5	Megan Guarnier (USA)	Boels–Dolmans	+ 49"
6	Arlenis Sierra (CUB)	Astana	+ 49"
7	Coryn Rivera (USA)	Team Sunweb	+ 49"
8	Lauren Stephens (USA)	Tibco–Silicon Valley Bank	+ 49"
9	Tayler Wiles (USA)	UnitedHealthcare	+ 58"
10	Alena Amialiusik (BLR)	Canyon//SRAM	+ 1' 05"

General classification after Stage 2
Rank	Rider	Team	Time
1	Katie Hall (USA)	UnitedHealthcare	6h 13' 54"
2	Anna van der Breggen (NED)	Boels–Dolmans	+ 3"
3	Megan Guarnier (USA)	Boels–Dolmans	+ 29"
4	Kristabel Doebel-Hickok (USA)	Cylance Pro Cycling	+ 33"
5	Ruth Winder (USA)	UnitedHealthcare	+ 37"
6	Arlenis Sierra (CUB)	Astana	+ 40"
7	Lauren Stephens (USA)	Tibco–Silicon Valley Bank	+ 53"
8	Coryn Rivera (USA)	Team Sunweb	+ 59"
9	Alena Amialiusik (BLR)	Canyon//SRAM	+ 1' 17"
10	Martina Ritter (AUT)	Drops	+ 1' 26"

=== Stage 3 ===
13 May 2017 — Elk Grove to Sacramento, 118 km (73.3 mi)

Stage 3 result
Rank	Rider	Team	Time
1	Coryn Rivera (USA)	Team Sunweb	2h 55' 37"
2	Arlenis Sierra (CUB)	Astana	+ 0"
3	Giorgia Bronzini (ITA)	Wiggle High5	+ 0"
4	Barbara Guarischi (ITA)	Canyon//SRAM	+ 0"
5	Amy Pieters (NED)	Boels–Dolmans	+ 0"
6	Lizzie Williams (AUS)	Hagens Berman–Supermint	+ 0"
7	Emma White (USA)	Rally Cycling	+ 0"
8	Kirsti Lay (CAN)	Rally Cycling	+ 0"
9	Samantha Schneider (USA)	United States (national team)	+ 0"
10	Abby-Mae Parkinson (GBR)	Drops	+ 0"

General classification after Stage 3
Rank	Rider	Team	Time
1	Katie Hall (USA)	UnitedHealthcare	9h 09' 31"
2	Anna van der Breggen (NED)	Boels–Dolmans	+ 1"
3	Megan Guarnier (USA)	Boels–Dolmans	+ 29"
4	Arlenis Sierra (CUB)	Astana	+ 31"
5	Kristabel Doebel-Hickok (USA)	Cylance Pro Cycling	+ 33"
6	Ruth Winder (USA)	UnitedHealthcare	+ 37"
7	Coryn Rivera (USA)	Team Sunweb	+ 49"
8	Lauren Stephens (USA)	Tibco–Silicon Valley Bank	+ 53"
9	Alena Amialiusik (BLR)	Canyon//SRAM	+ 1' 17"
10	Martina Ritter (AUT)	Drops	+ 1' 26"

=== Stage 4 ===
14 May 2017 — Sacramento to Sacramento, 70 km (43.5 mi)

Stage 4 result
Rank	Rider	Team	Time
1	Giorgia Bronzini (ITA)	Wiggle High5	1h 38' 03"
2	Coryn Rivera (USA)	Team Sunweb	+ 0"
3	Kirsten Wild (NED)	Cylance Pro Cycling	+ 0"
4	Hannah Barnes (GBR)	Canyon//SRAM	+ 0"
5	Arlenis Sierra (CUB)	Astana	+ 0"
6	Emma White (USA)	Rally Cycling	+ 0"
7	Lizzie Williams (AUS)	Hagens Berman–Supermint	+ 0"
8	Trixi Worrack (GER)	Canyon//SRAM	+ 0"
9	Íngrid Drexel (MEX)	Tibco–Silicon Valley Bank	+ 0"
10	Samantha Schneider (USA)	United States (national team)	+ 0"

Final general classification
Rank	Rider	Team	Time
1	Anna van der Breggen (NED)	Boels–Dolmans	10h 47' 33"
2	Katie Hall (USA)	UnitedHealthcare	+ 1"
3	Arlenis Sierra (CUB)	Astana	+ 31"
4	Kristabel Doebel-Hickok (USA)	Cylance Pro Cycling	+ 34"
5	Ruth Winder (USA)	UnitedHealthcare	+ 38"
6	Coryn Rivera (USA)	Team Sunweb	+ 44"
7	Lauren Stephens (USA)	Tibco–Silicon Valley Bank	+ 54"
8	Alena Amialiusik (BLR)	Canyon//SRAM	+ 1' 39"
9	Martina Ritter (AUT)	Drops	+ 1' 42"
10	Leah Thomas (USA)	Sho-Air Twenty20	+ 1' 58"

== Classification leadership table ==
In the 2017 Tour of California, five different jerseys were awarded. For the general classification, calculated by adding each cyclist's finishing times on each stage, and allowing time bonuses for the first three finishers at intermediate sprints and at the finish of mass-start stages, the leader received a yellow jersey. This classification was considered the most important of the 2017 Tour of California, and the winner of the classification was considered the winner of the race.

Additionally, there was a sprints classification, which awarded a green jersey. In the sprints classification, cyclists received points for finishing in the top 10 in a stage. For winning a stage, a rider earned 15 points, with 12 for second, 9 for third, 7 for fourth with a point fewer per place down to a single point for 10th place. Points towards the classification could also be accrued – awarded on a 3–2–1 scale – at intermediate sprint points during each stage; these intermediate sprints also offered bonus seconds towards the general classification. There was also a mountains classification, the leadership of which was marked by a white jersey with red polka dots. In the mountains classification, points were won by reaching the top of a climb before other cyclists, with more points available for the higher-categorised climbs.

The fourth jersey represented the young rider classification, marked by a predominantly "white design" jersey. This was decided in the same way as the general classification, but only riders born after 1 January 1992 were eligible to be ranked in the classification. There was also a classification for teams, in which the times of the best three cyclists per team on each stage were added together; the leading team at the end of the race was the team with the lowest total time. In addition, there was a combativity award given after each stage to the rider considered, by a jury, to have "who best exemplifies the character of those engaged in the fight against cancer / heart disease", in line with the jersey's sponsors. This award was marked by a blue jersey.

Stage	Winner	General classification	Sprints classification	Mountains classification	Young rider classification	Most courageous rider	Team classification
1	Megan Guarnier	Megan Guarnier	Megan Guarnier	Megan Guarnier	Arlenis Sierra	Lizzie Williams	Cylance Pro Cycling
2	Katie Hall	Katie Hall	Anna van der Breggen	Katie Hall	Ruth Winder	Juliette Labous	UnitedHealthcare
3	Coryn Rivera	Katie Hall	Arlenis Sierra	Katie Hall	Arlenis Sierra	Mandy Heintz	UnitedHealthcare
4	Giorgia Bronzini	Anna van der Breggen	Arlenis Sierra	Katie Hall	Arlenis Sierra	Rushlee Buchanan	UnitedHealthcare
Final		Anna van der Breggen	Arlenis Sierra	Katie Hall	Arlenis Sierra	Not awarded	UnitedHealthcare
