= Christina Gokey-Smith =

American cyclist

Personal information
- Born: November 28, 1973 (age 52) Fort Worth, Texas, United States

Cycling career
- Sport: Cycling
- Current team: Colavita–Factor
- Discipline: Road
- Role: Rider
- Rider type: Sprinter

Amateur teams
- 2009–2010: Veloforma / ZYM
- 2011–2012: NOW and Novartis for MS
- 2014: Pepper Palace Pro Cycling
- 2016: Happy Tooth Women's Racing
- 2017: Papa John's Racing p/b Trek
- 2018–: Colavita–Bialetti

Professional team
- 2015: Pepper Palace p/b The Happy Tooth

Christina Gokey-Smith (born November 28, 1973) is an American racing cyclist, who rides for American amateur team Colavita–Factor. Before becoming a cyclist she competed in equestrianism.

== Major results ==
2009
8th Overall Tulsa Tough
2010
3rd Overall Tulsa Tough
2011
1st Overall Tulsa Tough
3rd Athens Twilight Criterium
7th Liberty Classic
2012
6th Overall Tulsa Tough
9th Overall Tour of Elk Grove
2013
4th Overall Tulsa Tough
2014
7th Overall Tour of America's Dairyland
2015
2nd Overall Tulsa Tough
2016
7th Overall Tour of America's Dairyland
10th Overall Tulsa Tough

== See also ==
- List of 2015 UCI Women's Teams and riders
