= Jessica Cerra =

American cyclist

Personal information
- Full name: Jessica Cerra
- Born: May 1, 1982 (age 44)

Cycling career
- Sport: Cycling
- Discipline: Road
- Role: Rider
- Rider type: Domestique

Professional teams
- 2015–2016: Twenty16 p/b Sho-Air
- 2017–2019: Hagens Berman–Supermint

Jessica Cerra (born May 1, 1982) is an American professional racing cyclist, who rode for UCI Women's Team Hagens Berman–Supermint.

== Major results ==
2018
Redlands Bicycle Classic

1st Mountains classification
1st Stage 4

== See also ==
- List of 2016 UCI Women's Teams and riders
