= Laura Jorgensen =

American racing cyclist

Personal information
- Born: August 4, 1986 (age 40)

Cycling career
- Sport: Cycling
- Current team: Pepper Palace p/b The Happy Tooth
- Role: Rider

Professional team
- 2015-: Pepper Palace p/b The Happy Tooth

Laura Jorgensen (born August 4, 1986) was an American professional racing cyclist. She rode for the Pepper Palace p/b The Happy Tooth team.

== See also ==
- List of 2015 UCI Women's Teams and riders
