= Starla Teddergreen =

American cyclist

Personal information
- Full name: Starla Teddergreen
- Born: December 11, 1979 (age 46) Colville, Washington, U.S.
- Height: 5 ft 4 in (163 cm)

Cycling career
- Sport: Cycling
- Current team: Distance To Empty
- Disciplines: MTB and Gravel
- Role: Team owner and Rider

Professional teams
- 2010–2019: Hagens Berman–Supermint
- 2020–2021: Team Illuminate

Starla Teddergreen (born December 11, 1979) is an American professional racing cyclist, who currently rides for Distance To Empty pro Racing After a fifteen-year professional career on the road, she transitioned to gravel and mountain bike racing in 2021, competing independently under the Distance To Empty banner.
