= Erica Zaveta =

American cyclist (born 1989)

Personal information
- Born: September 6, 1989 (age 37)

Cycling career
- Sport: Cycling
- Disciplines: Road; Cyclo-cross; MTB
- Role: Rider

Amateur teams
- 2013-2014: Team Redline (Cyclocross)
- 2015: Maxxis-Shimano (Cyclocross)
- 2017-2019: Garneau-Easton (Cyclocross)
- 2019: The Pony Shop p/b KPMG (Cyclocross)
- 2020: 3G BC (Cyclocross)

Professional teams
- 2015: BMW p/b Happy Tooth Dental
- 2016-2017: Cylance Pro Cycling

Erica Zaveta (born September 6, 1989) is an American professional racing cyclist who rides for Cylance Pro Cycling.

== Major results ==
2013
1st Collegiate Division 2 National Cyclo-cross Championships

== See also ==
- List of 2016 UCI Women's Teams and riders
