= Eleonora Patuzzo =

Italian cyclist

Personal information
- Born: 16 October 1989 (age 36) Italy

Cycling career
- Sport: Cycling
- Discipline: Road cycling

Professional teams
- 2008: Cycling Team Titanedi-Frezza-Acca Due O
- 2009–2011: Safi-Pasta Zara

Eleonora Patuzzo (born 16 October 1989) is a road cyclist from Italy. She represented her nation at the 2010 UCI Road World Championships.
