= Rhae-Christie Shaw =

Canadian cyclist

Personal information
- Born: 20 November 1975 (age 50) Canada

Cycling career
- Sport: Cycling
- Current team: Retired
- Discipline: Road
- Role: Rider

Amateur teams
- 2011: RED Racing
- 2013–2014: Vanderkitten

Professional teams
- 2012: Exergy Twenty12
- 2015: BMW p/b Happy Tooth Dental
Medal record
Women's road bicycle racing
Representing Canada
Pan American Championships
Silver medal – second place	2012 Mar del Plata	Time trial

Rhae-Christie Shaw (born 20 November 1975) is a Canadian former road cyclist. She participated at the 2011 UCI Road World Championships and 2012 UCI Road World Championships. Shaw was the winner of the criterium at the 2012 Canadian National Road Championships, and won a silver medal in the time trial at the 2012 Pan American Cycling Championships.

== Major results ==
2011
1st Stage 2 (ITT) Tour Féminin en Limousin
3rd Time trial, National Road Championships
3rd Overall Tour de Bretagne Féminin

1st Stages 2 (ITT) & 3

6th Overall Sea Otter Classic
7th UCI Road World Championships – Women's time trial
8th Overall Tour of the Gila
2012
National Road Championships

1st Criterium
2nd Time trial

2nd Time trial, Pan American Road Championships
6th Chrono Gatineau
8th Overall Tour of Elk Grove
2013
3rd Overall Redlands Bicycle Classic
6th Overall San Dimas Stage Race
2015
1st Stage 2 (ITT) Redlands Bicycle Classic
