= Julie Kuliecza =

American cyclist

Personal information
- Full name: Julie Kuliecza
- Born: November 4, 1980 (age 45) Alexandria, Virginia, United States

Cycling career
- Sport: Cycling
- Discipline: Road
- Role: Rider
- Rider type: Domestique

Amateur team
- 2014: Pepper Palace Pro Cycling

Professional teams
- 2015: Pepper Palace p/b The Happy Tooth
- 2016–2019: Hagens Berman–Supermint

Julie Kuliecza (born November 4, 1980) is an American professional racing cyclist, who rode for UCI Women's Team Hagens Berman–Supermint.

== See also ==
- List of 2015 UCI Women's Teams and riders
