= Courteney Lowe =

New Zealand cyclist

Personal information
- Born: 26 March 1991 (age 35) Tauranga, New Zealand

Cycling career
- Sport: Cycling
- Current team: Pepper Palace p/b The Happy Tooth
- Role: Rider

Professional teams
- 2012-2014: Optum Pro Cycling
- 2015-: Pepper Palace p/b The Happy Tooth

Courteney Lowe (born 26 March 1991) was a New Zealand professional racing cyclist.

== Professional career ==
She won the New Zealand National Road Race Championships in 2013 and placed 2nd in 2012.

== See also ==
- Optum-Kelly Benefit Strategies
