= Jessica Uebelhart =

Swiss cyclist

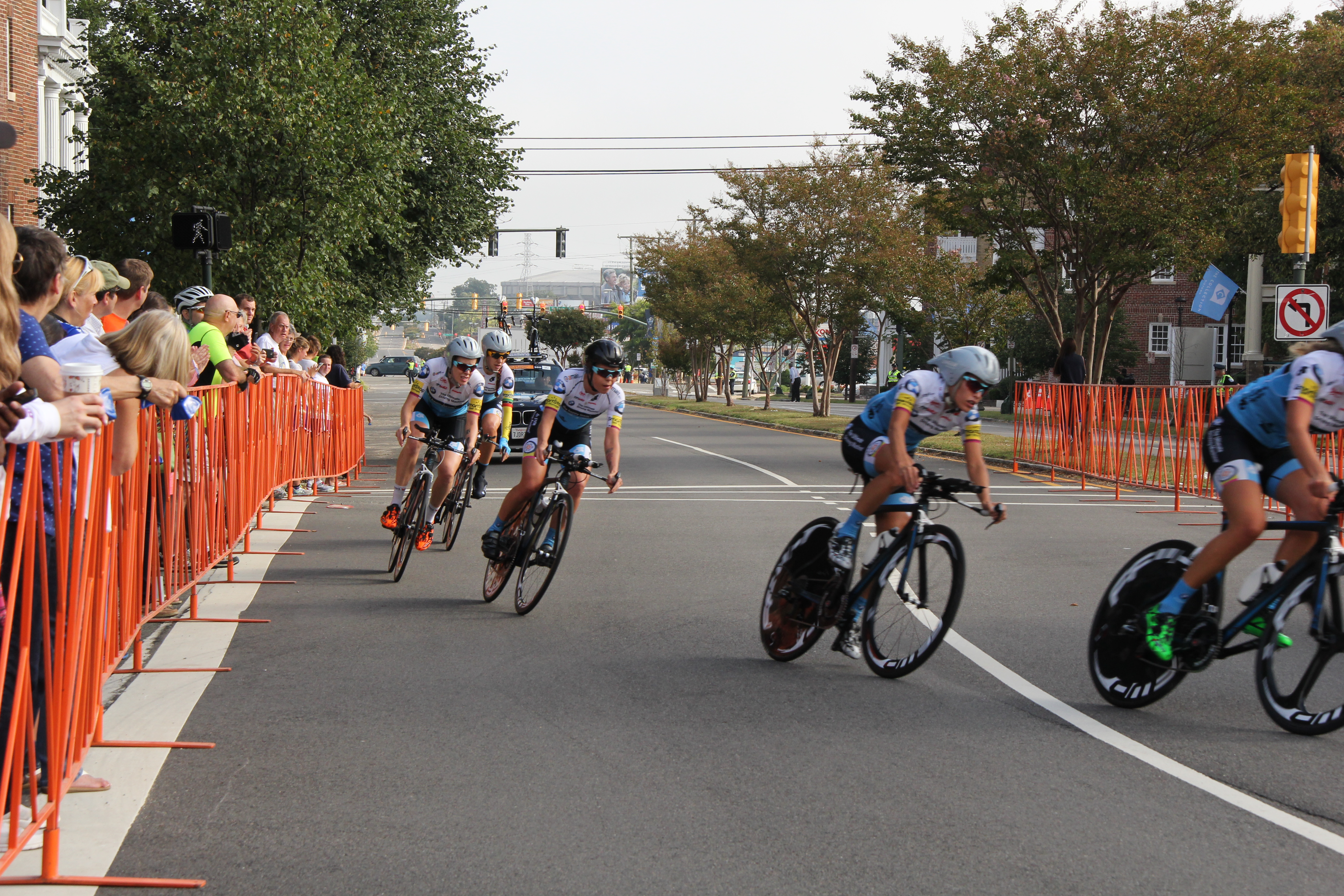
- Riding with her team at the 2015 UCI Road World Championships

Personal information
- Born: 16 October 1990 (age 35) Locarno, Switzerland

Cycling career
- Sport: Cycling
- Current team: Retired
- Discipline: Road
- Role: Rider

Amateur team
- 2010: Bigla Cycling Team

Professional teams
- 2009: Bigla Cycling Team
- 2011: Diadora–Pasta Zara
- 2012–2013: Forno d'Asolo Colavita
- 2015: BMW p/b Happy Tooth Dental
- 2016: Hagens Berman–Supermint

Jessica Uebelhart (born 16 October 1990) is a Swiss former professional racing cyclist. She rode in the women's team time trial at the 2015 UCI Road World Championships. Also in 2015, Uebelhart finished ninth at the White Spot / Delta Road Race, and tenth at the SwissEver GP Cham-Hagendorn.
