= Winston-Salem Cycling Classic (women's race) =

Bicycle race

Race details
- Date: June (2013); April (2014); Memorial Day (2015–2019); September (2021)
- Region: United States
- Discipline: Road
- Competition: USA Cycling Pro Road Tour
- Type: One-day
- Organiser: Winston Salem Cycling LLC
- Race director: Raymond Boden
- Web site: www.winstonsalemcycling.com

History
- First edition: 2013
- Editions: 8 (as of 2021)
- First winner: Alison Powers (USA)
- Most wins: No repeat winners
- Most recent: Erica Clevenger (USA); Maggie Coles-Lyster (CAN)

The Winston-Salem Cycling Classic is a women's one-day road bicycle race held in the United States. Between 2017 and 2019, it was rated by the UCI as a 1.1 race.

== Past winners ==
=== Road race ===
Year	Country	Rider	Team
2013	United States	Alison Powers	NOW and Novartis for MS
2014	United States	Shelley Olds	Alé–Cipollini
2015	Belarus	Alena Amialiusik	Velocio–SRAM
2016	Italy	Rossella Ratto	Cylance Pro Cycling
2017	United States	Lauren Stephens	Tibco–Silicon Valley Bank
2018	United States	Lily Williams	Hagens Berman–Supermint
2019	United States	Leigh Ann Ganzar	Hagens Berman–Supermint
2020	No race due to the COVID-19 pandemic in North Carolina		
2021	No race		

=== Criterium ===
Year	Country	Rider	Team
2013	United States	Alison Powers	NOW and Novartis for MS
2014	Italy	Elena Cecchini	Estado de México–Faren Kuota
2015	United States	Alexis Ryan	UnitedHealthcare
2016	United States	Coryn Rivera	UnitedHealthcare
2017	United States	Samantha Schneider	ISCorp p/b Progress Software
2018	United States	Samantha Schneider	ISCorp p/b Progress Software
2019	United States	Chloé Dygert-Owen	Sho-Air TWENTY20
2020	No race due to the COVID-19 pandemic in North Carolina		
2021 (Day 1)	United States	Erica Clevenger	DNA Pro Cycling
2021 (Day 2)	Canada	Maggie Coles-Lyster	DNA Pro Cycling
