= Amy Phillips (cyclist) =

American racing cyclist

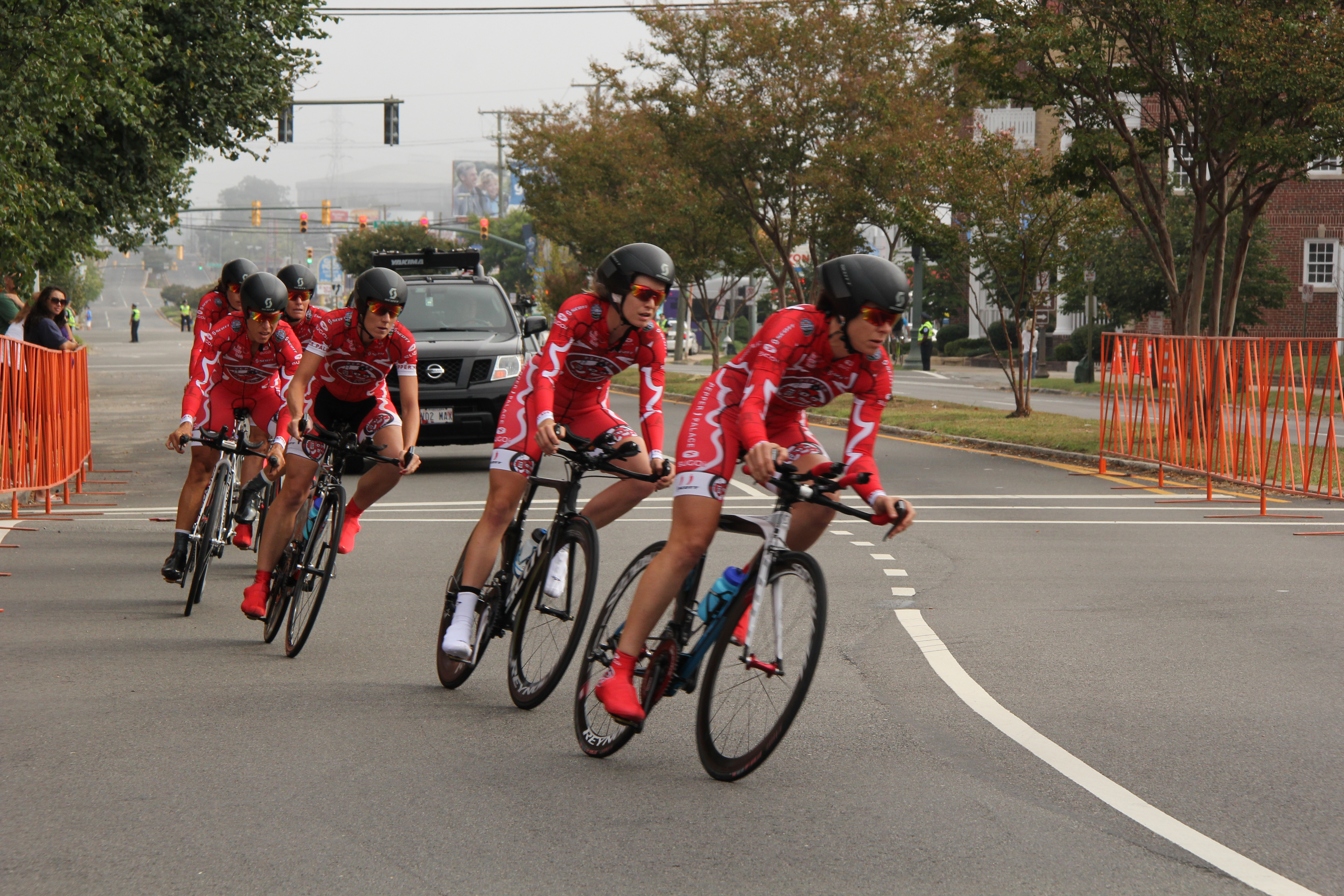
- Riding with her team at the 2015 UCI Road World Championships

Personal information
- Born: September 30, 1973 (age 53)

Cycling career
- Sport: Cycling
- Role: Rider
- Rider type: All-rounder

Amy Phillips (born September 30, 1973) is an American professional racing cyclist. She rides for the Pepper Palace p/b The Happy Tooth team.

== See also ==
- List of 2015 UCI Women's Teams and riders
