= Leigh Ann Ganzar =

American cyclist

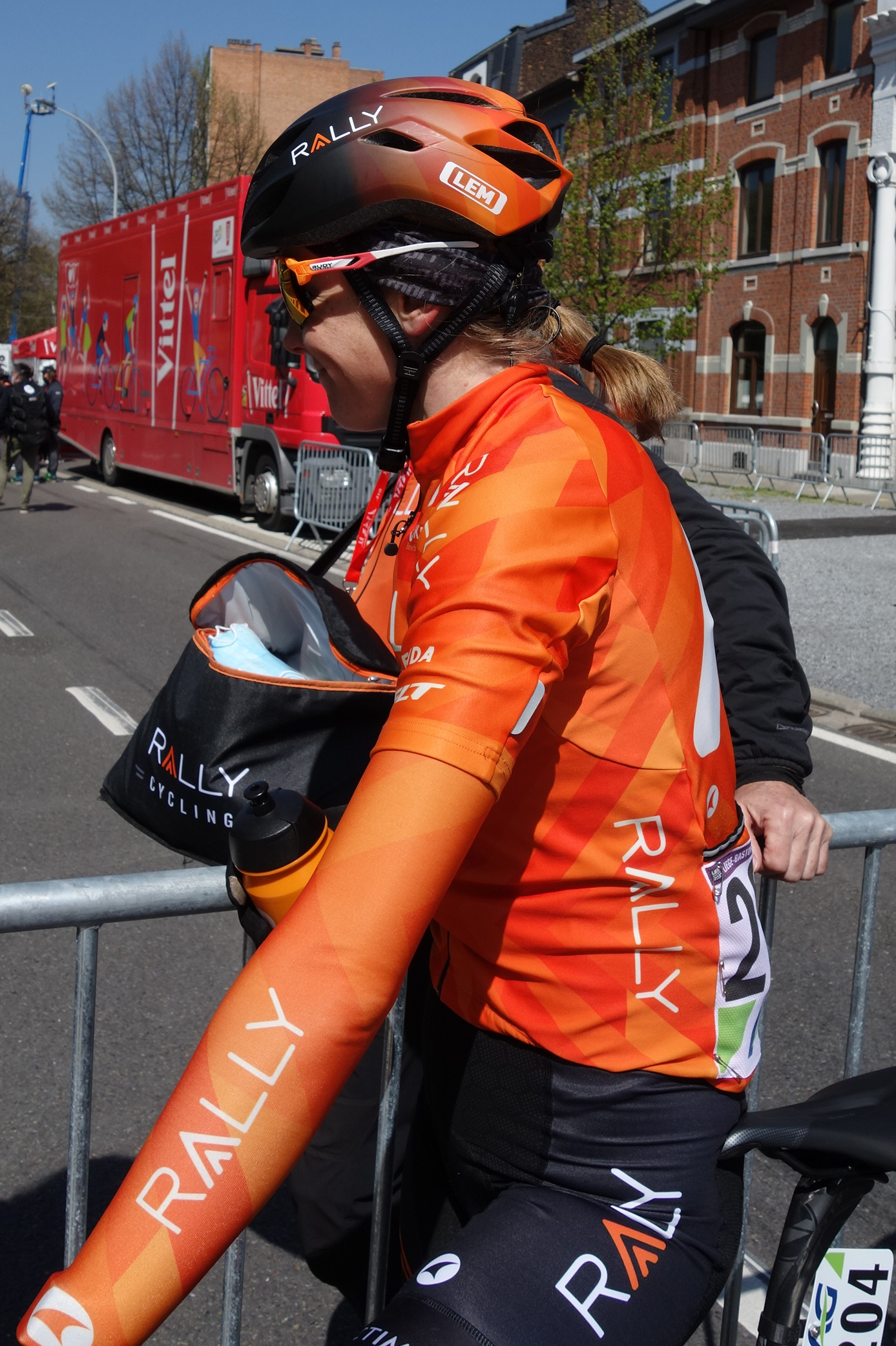

Personal information
- Full name: Leigh Ann Ganzar
- Born: September 8, 1989 (age 37)

Cycling career
- Sport: Cycling
- Discipline: Road

Professional teams
- 2019: Hagens Berman–Supermint
- 2020–2021: Rally Cycling

Leigh Ann Ganzar (born September 8, 1989) is an American former professional racing cyclist, who last rode for UCI Women's Continental Team Rally Cycling.
