= Whitney Allison =

American cyclist

Personal information
- Full name: Whitney Allison
- Born: Whitney Schultz; March 1, 1988 (age 38)

Cycling career
- Sport: Cycling
- Discipline: Road
- Role: Rider

Amateur teams
- 2012: Fort Follies
- 2013–2015: Colavita–Fine Cooking
- 2021-: Bike Sports

Professional teams
- 2016–2017: Colavita/Bianchi
- 2018–2019: Hagens Berman–Supermint
- 2020: ButcherBox Cycling

Whitney Allison (née Schultz; born March 1, 1988) is an American former road racing cyclist and current off-road cyclist, who competes in gravel bike racing for Bike Sports.

In 2022 Whitney Allison came in 4th place at the LifeTime Unbound Gravel 200, she was 2nd place in the premiere "Black Course" at SBT GRVL, and won the Belgian Waffle Ride Utah

== See also ==
- List of 2016 UCI Women's Teams and riders
