= Lindsay Goldman =

American cyclist

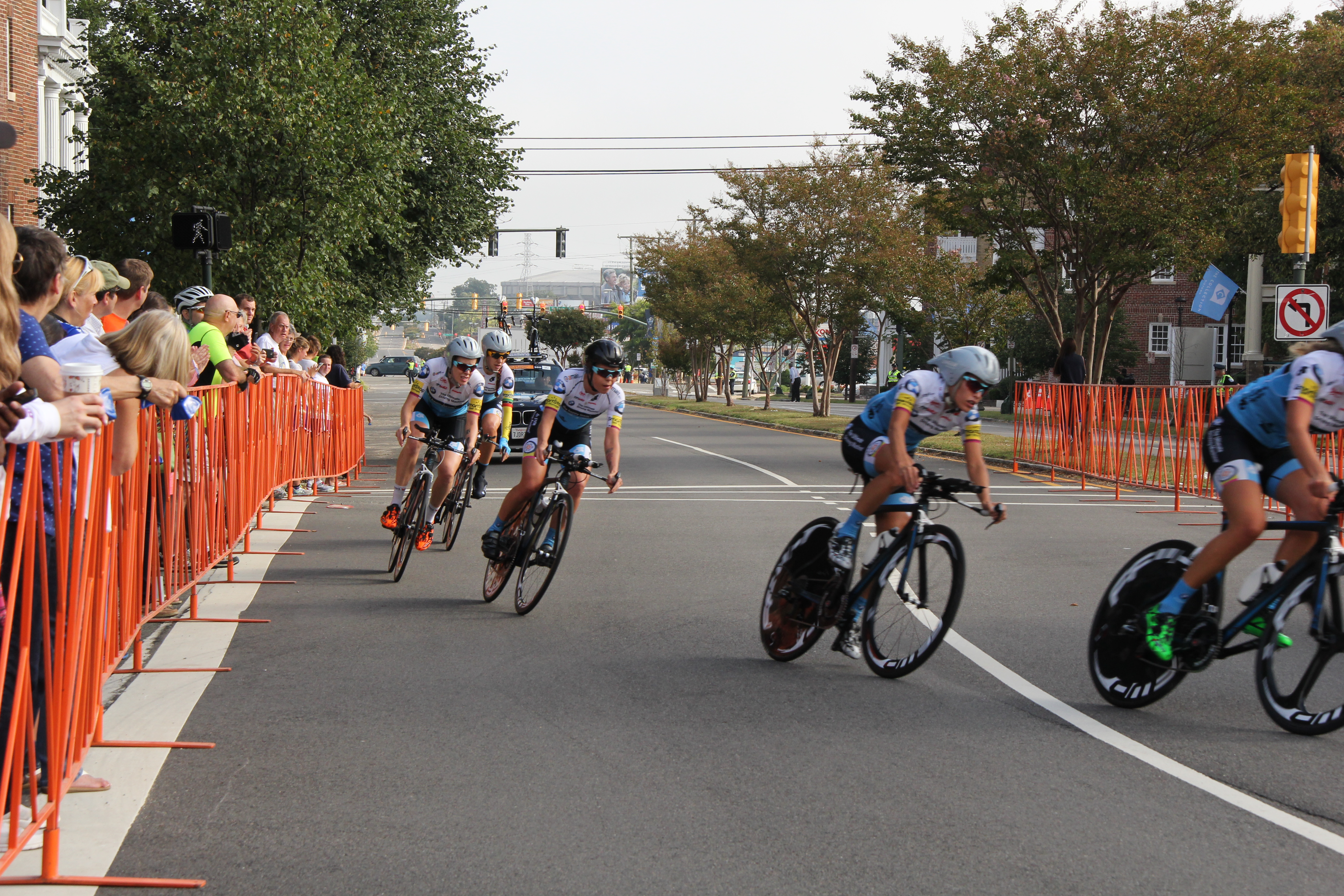
- Riding with her team at the 2015 UCI Road World Championships

Personal information
- Full name: Lindsay Goldman
- Born: Lindsay Bayer; October 31, 1984 (age 41)

Cycling career
- Sport: Cycling
- Discipline: Road
- Role: Rider; Team manager

Amateur team
- 2013–2014: Colavita–Fine Cooking

Professional teams
- 2015: Pepper Palace p/b The Happy Tooth
- 2015: BMW p/b Happy Tooth Dental
- 2016–: Hagens Berman–Supermint

Managerial team
- 2016–2019: Hagens Berman–Supermint

Lindsay Goldman (née Bayer; born October 31, 1984) is an American professional racing cyclist, who rode for and co-owns UCI Women's Team Hagens Berman–Supermint.

== See also ==
- List of 2015 UCI Women's Teams and riders
- Hagens Berman–Supermint
