= Sara Headley =

American cyclist

Personal information
- Born: April 5, 1985 (age 41)

Cycling career
- Sport: Cycling
- Current team: Podium Ambition Pro Cycling
- Role: Rider
- Rider type: Classics specialist

Professional teams
- 2014-2015: Team TIBCO–To The Top
- 2016: Podium Ambition Pro Cycling

Sara Headley (born April 5, 1985) is an American former professional racing cyclist. Outside of cycling she has a bachelor's degree in nursing, having mostly worked in emergency and acute care. She first became interested in road racing whilst studying at the University of Vermont, but didn't start her road racing career until 2008, whilst working as a nurse. After two years riding professionally with Team TIBCO–To The Top, in October 2015 she was announced as a member of British team Podium Ambition Pro Cycling for 2016. In July 2016 she announced her retirement from competition.

== See also ==
- List of 2015 UCI Women's Teams and riders
