= Alice Cobb =

British cyclist

Personal information
- Full name: Alice Grace Cobb
- Born: 31 July 1995 (age 31)

Cycling career
- Sport: Cycling
- Discipline: Road
- Role: Rider
- Rider type: Rouleur

Amateur teams
- 2013: Ikon–Mazda
- 2014: Squadra Donne
- 2015: The Racing Chance Foundation
- 2016: Matrix Pro Cycling

Professional teams
- 2017: Lares–Waowdeals
- 2018–2019: Tibco–Silicon Valley Bank
- 2020: Charente-Maritime Women Cycling

Alice Grace Cobb (born 31 July 1995) is a British racing cyclist, who most recently rode for UCI Women's Continental Team Charente-Maritime Women Cycling. She rode in the women's road race event at the 2018 UCI Road World Championships.
