= Happy Tooth Women's Racing =

American cycling team

Team information
- UCI code: PEP (2013–2014); PPC (2015); HAM (2016)
- Registered: United States
- Discipline: Road
- Status: National (2013–2014); UCI Women's Team (2015); National (2016)

Key personnel
- Team manager: Nicole Wangsgard

Team name history
- 2013–2014 2015 2016: Pepper Palace Pro Cycling Team; Pepper Palace p/b The Happy Tooth; Happy Tooth Women's Racing

Happy Tooth Women's Racing (UCI code HAM) was a professional women's cycling team, based in the United States of America, which competed in elite women's road bicycle racing events in 2015. Before and after 2015 the team competed at domestic level.

== Team roster ==
=== 2015 ===
As of 10 March 2015. Ages as of 1 January 2015.

Rider	Date of birth
Julie Emmerman (USA)	April 9, 1976 (aged 38)
Amy Phillips (USA)	September 30, 1973 (aged 41)
Laura Jorgensen (USA)	August 4, 1986 (aged 28)
Julie Kuliecza (USA)	November 4, 1980 (aged 34)
Tina Mayolo Pic (USA)	May 9, 1966 (aged 48)
Amanda Miller (USA)	December 13, 1986 (aged 28)

Rider	Date of birth
Amber Pierce (USA)	March 25, 1981 (aged 33)
Meredith Miller (USA)	December 26, 1973 (aged 41)
Christina Gokey-Smith (USA)	November 28, 1973 (aged 41)
Lindsay Bayer (USA)	October 31, 1984 (aged 30)
Courteney Lowe (NZL)	March 26, 1991 (aged 23)
Sarah Caravella (USA)	May 31, 1979 (aged 35)
