= Sinead Miller =

American cyclist

Personal information
- Full name: Sinead Emily Miller
- Nickname: "Golden Girl"
- Born: June 9, 1990 (age 36) USA
- Height: 5 ft 7 in (1.70 m)
- Weight: 125 lb (57 kg)

Cycling career
- Sport: Cycling
- Disciplines: Road, Track
- Role: Rider
- Rider type: All Around

Amateur teams
- –: USA National Development Program
- –: Peanut Butter and Co./Team Twenty12

Sinead Emily Miller (born June 9, 1990) is an American elite racing cyclist and winner of the 2009 Collegiate Cycling National Criterium Championship.

== Cycling experience ==
Miller began racing BMX bicycles at age five. She competed at the highest levels in BMX and was part of several professional teams. During most of Miller 's racing years she was a part of HYPER Bicycles Factory BMX team.

To cross train for BMX, Miller began training on road bicycles at age ten and began to race on the road at age 11. She won her first road cycling national championship title at age 14. As her cycling career progressed, she won numerous national titles and also was selected to compete at the Junior Road World Championships at ages 17 and 18. In 2008, Miller placed eighth at the Junior Road World Championships in Cape Town, South Africa.

Miller joined the U.S. National Team at age 18. She raced for the team in Italy, France, Poland, Czech Republic, Austria, South Africa, Netherlands, Belgium and Mexico.

Miller raced collegiality for Marian University's cycling team. In 2008–2009, Miller won collegiate track national championships and also collegiate road criterium national championships. She was the first female cyclist from Marian to win a collegiate road national championship.

Because of Miller's performance and final results in the omnium ranking at the collegiate road nationals in Fort Collins, Colorado in March 2009, she was named a "Collegiate All-Star" and selected for the all-collegiate-women's team that would compete in the Nature Valley Grand Prix later that season. She is also a past winner of the International Tour de Toona.

== Cycling career ==
Date	Event	Placement
July 2–11, 2010	Giro Donne, Italy	-
June 27, 2010	U23 US Road National Championships, Bend, Oregon	1st Place
June 24, 2010	U23 US National Time Trial Championships, Bend, Oregon	1st place
June 6, 2010	TD Bank Philadelphia International Cycling Championship, Philadelphia, Pennsylvania	1st Place in Best Young Rider Category
May 9, 2010	Collegiate Road National Championships, Madison, Wisconsin	1st place- Division 1 Team Omnium
April 5, 2010	GP de Dottignies, Belgium, UCI 1.2	20th Place
April 4, 2010	Ronde Van Vlaanderen, Belgium, UCI World Cup	-
March 28, 2010	Trofeo Alfredo Binda - Comune di Cittiglio, Italy, UCI World Cup	18th Place
May 9, 2009	Collegiate Road National Championships, Fort Collins, CO	1st place- Women’s Division 1 Criterium
April 7 – May 5, 2009	Raced with U.S. Women’s National Team throughout Europe	1st place- Challenge Alienor - in Bordeaux, France. 3rd place- Women’s road race in Agen, France
September 11–13, 2008	Collegiate Track National Championships	1st- Women’s Team Pursuit. 1st- Collegiate Team Pursuit. 1st- Women’s Points Race. 3rd- Women’s 2 Kilometer Time Trial
September 6–9, 2008	Junior National Championships, Orange County, CA	1st Place - Junior Women’s 17-18 Criterium
July 20, 2008	Junior World Championships, Cape Town, South Africa	8th –Women’s Road Race
July 10–13, 2008	Raced UCI 2.2 Krasna Lipa Stage Race, Czech Republic	-
July 3–14, 2008	Attended training camp with Women’s U.S. National Team in Lucca, Italy	-
June 15, 2008	Junior World Championships Selection Road Race, Red River Gorge, Kentucky	1st place - Junior Women 17-18
April 26–27, 2008	Tour de Ephrata, Ephrata, PA	1st- Road Race Women’s Pro 1/2/3. 1st- Criterium Women’s Pro 1/2/3. 2nd – Time Trial Women’s Pro 1/2/3. 1st – Overall GC Women’s Pro 1/2/3
March 3, 2008	Arnold Classic Criterium, Columbus, OH	1st Place - Women’s Pro 1/2/3
2007	Junior National Championships, Seven Springs, Pennsylvania	1st Place- Junior Women’s 17-18 Criterium
2007	Raced Junior World Road Race and Time Trial Championships, Mexico	-
2004	Junior National Championships, Salt Lake City, Utah	1st Place- Junior Women’s 14-15 Criterium
