= Hagens Berman–Supermint =

American cycling team

Team information
- UCI code: HBS
- Registered: United States
- Founded: 2016
- Disbanded: 2019
- Discipline: Road
- Status: UCI Women's Team
- Bicycles: Scott
- Website: Team home page

Key personnel
- General manager: Lindsay Goldman
- Team manager: George Hamilton

Team name history
- 2016–2019: Hagens Berman–Supermint
Hagens Berman–Supermint jersey
Jersey

Hagens Berman–Supermint was a professional UCI women's cycling team, based in the United States, which competes in elite women's road bicycle racing events. After BMW p/b Happy Tooth Dental disbanded at the end of 2015, a number of key riders moved across to the team. The team is co-owned by directeur sportif Jono Coulter and rider Lindsay Goldman.

== Team roster ==
As of February 16, 2019.

Rider	Date of birth
Whitney Allison (USA)	March 1, 1988 (age 38)
Jessica Cerra (USA)	May 1, 1982 (age 44)
Leigh Ann Ganzar (USA)	September 8, 1989 (age 36)
Lindsay Goldman (USA)	October 31, 1984 (age 41)
Julie Kuliecza (USA)	November 4, 1980 (age 45)

Rider	Date of birth
Harriet Owen (GBR)	December 16, 1993 (age 32)
Liza Rachetto (USA)	January 30, 1974 (age 52)
Starla Teddergreen (USA)	December 11, 1979 (age 46)
Aimee Vasse (USA)	July 22, 1978 (age 48)
Lily Williams (USA)	June 24, 1994 (age 32)

== Major results ==
2018
Overall Tucson Bicycle Classic, Jennifer Luebke

Stage 1 (ITT), Jennifer Luebke

Sprints classification Redlands Bicycle Classic, Jessica Cerra

Mountain classification, Starla Teddergreen
Stage 4, Jessica Cerra

Sunny King Criterium, Lily Williams
Combativity award Tour of California Stage 1, Whitney Allison
Combativity award Tour of California Stage 2, Lily Williams
Winston-Salem Cycling Classic, Lily Williams
2019
Winston-Salem Cycling Classic, Leigh Ann Ganzar

== National champions ==
2016
Japan Time Trial, Eri Yonamine
Japan Road Race, Eri Yonamine

2017
Australia Cyclo-cross, Peta Mullens
