= Lauren Komanski =

American cyclist

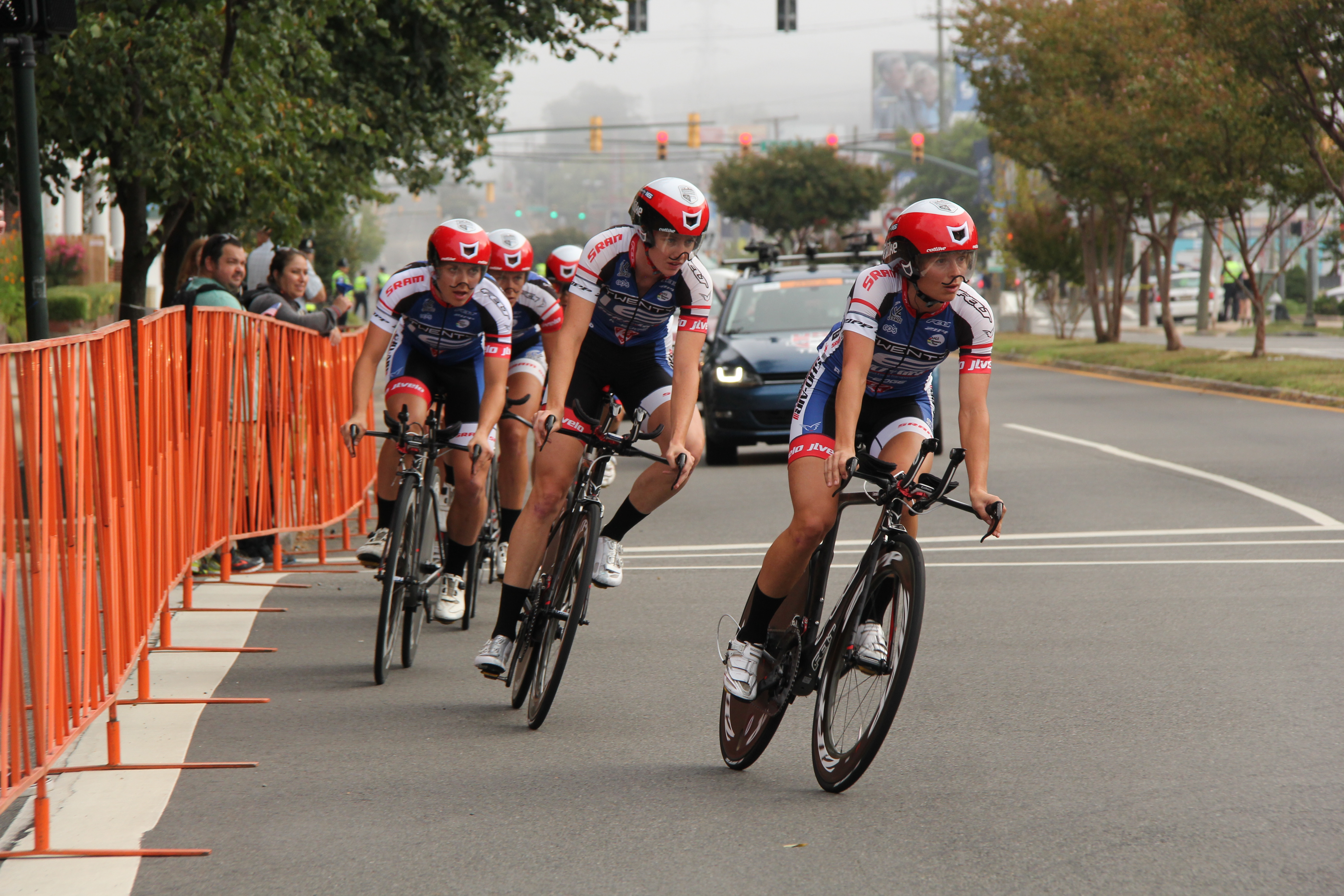
- Riding with Twenty16 p/b Sho-Air at the 2015 UCI Road World Championships

Personal information
- Full name: Lauren Rauck Komanski
- Nicknames: Rauck, Komanska
- Born: June 17, 1985 (age 41) Winston-Salem, North Carolina, United States
- Height: 6 ft 0 in (183 cm)

Cycling career
- Sport: Cycling
- Current team: Retired
- Discipline: Road
- Role: Rider
- Rider type: All-rounder

Amateur teams
- 2012: Pain Pathways
- 2013: NOW & Novartis for MS
- 2014: Twenty16

Professional teams
- 2015: Twenty16 p/b Sho-Air
- 2016: Tibco–Silicon Valley Bank

Lauren Rauck Komanski (born June 17, 1985) is an American former road cyclist. She attended Columbia University, where she was an NCAA Division I track and cross-country runner. She took up cycle racing in 2012, winning the first bike race she entered. She initially combined racing and training with a career in veterinary medicine before focusing fully on cycling from 2014.

== Major results ==
2015
1st Stage 1 (TTT) Women's Tour of New Zealand
1st Stage 7 Tour Cycliste Féminin International de l'Ardèche
3rd Overall Tour of California
3rd Winston-Salem Cycling Classic
