= Andrea Dvorak =

American cyclist

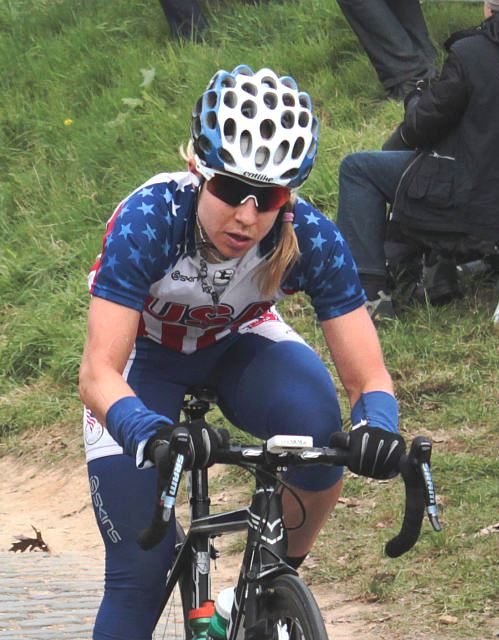
- Dvorak in 2012

Personal information
- Born: October 9, 1980 (age 46) Washington, D.C., United States
- Height: 5 ft 5 in (165 cm)
- Weight: 118 lb (54 kg)

Cycling career
- Sport: Cycling
- Current team: Retired
- Discipline: Road
- Role: Rider

Amateur team
- 2019: Miller School of Albemarle

Professional teams
- 2007–2009: Colavita–Sutter Home
- 2010: Colavita/Baci
- 2011: Colavita Forno d'Asolo
- 2012–2013: Exergy Twenty12
- 2014: Team TIBCO–To The Top
- 2015: Twenty16 p/b Sho-Air

Andrea Dvorak (born October 9, 1980) is an American former professional racing cyclist.

== Career ==
Before becoming a cyclist, Dvorak was a triathlete and swimmer, winning a national triathlon title whilst at university and training as a triathlete at the United States Olympic Training Center in the summer of 2003. She turned professional after graduating from law school. Dvorak finished runner-up at the United States National Road Race Championships in 2011, before winning a stage of La Route de France the following year. In 2015, she finished tenth overall at the Tour of California.

== Personal life ==
Dvorak was educated at the University of Virginia, where she graduated in 2003 with a Bachelor of Arts (BA) degree in Biology and Spanish, and graduated with a Juris Doctor from Virginia School of Law in 2006.
