= Liza Rachetto =

American cyclist

Personal information
- Born: January 30, 1974 (age 52) Boise, Idaho, United States

Cycling career
- Sport: Cycling
- Current team: DNA Pro Cycling
- Discipline: Road
- Role: Rider
- Rider type: Domestique

Professional teams
- 2007–2008: Team Tibco
- 2015: BMW p/b Happy Tooth Dental
- 2016–2019: Hagens Berman–Supermint
- 2020–: DNA Pro Cycling

Liza Rachetto (born January 30, 1974) is an American professional racing cyclist, who currently rides for UCI Women's Continental Team DNA Pro Cycling. Liza has competed in 19 Ironman races and won the 45-49 Age Category at the 2022 Ironman World Championships in Kona, Hawaii.

== See also ==
- List of 2016 UCI Women's Teams and riders
