= Sarah Caravella =

American cyclist

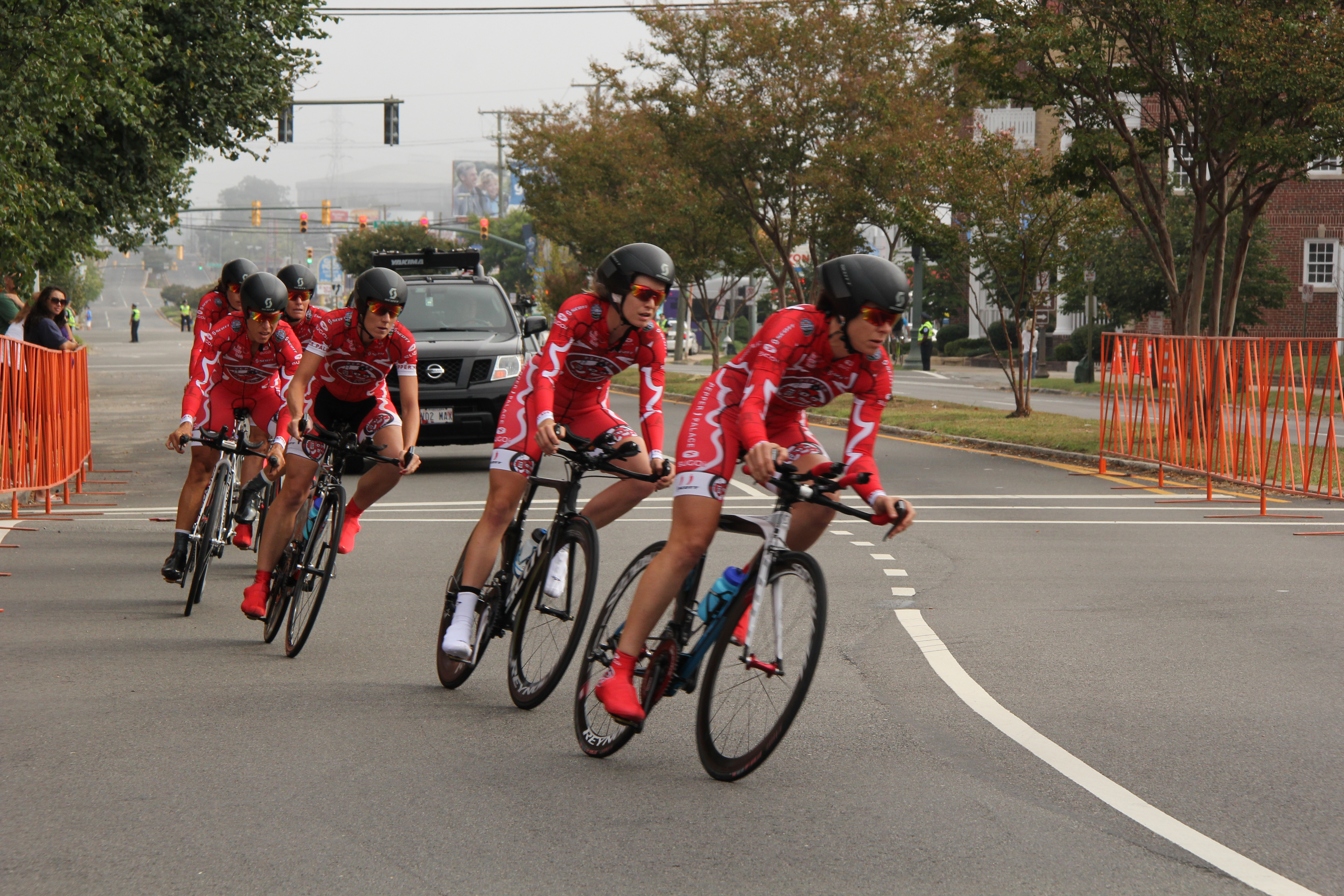
- Riding with her team at the 2015 UCI Road World Championships

Personal information
- Born: May 31, 1979 (age 47)

Cycling career
- Sport: Cycling
- Role: Rider

Sarah Caravella (born May 31, 1979) is an American professional racing cyclist. She rides for team Pepper Palace p/b The Happy Tooth.

== See also ==
- List of 2015 UCI Women's Teams and riders
