= BMW p/b Happy Tooth Dental =

American cycling team

Team information
- UCI code: BMW
- Registered: United States
- Founded: 2015
- Disbanded: 2015
- Discipline: Road
- Status: UCI Women's Team

Key personnel
- General manager: Jonathan Coulter; Omer Kem

Team name history
- 2015: BMW p/b Happy Tooth Dental

BMW p/b Happy Tooth Dental (UCI code BMW) was a professional women's cycling team, based in the United States of America, which competed in elite women's road bicycle racing events in 2015.

== Team roster ==
2015 Roster. Ages as of 1 January 2015.

Rider	Date of birth
Elle Anderson (USA)	March 29, 1988 (aged 26)
Kathryn Bertine (SKN)	May 11, 1975 (aged 39)
Robin Farina (USA)	March 9, 1977 (aged 37)
Lindsay Goldman (USA)	October 31, 1984 (aged 30)
Miranda Griffiths (AUS)	October 4, 1981 (aged 33)
Korina Huizar (USA)	September 16, 1987 (aged 27)
Breanne Nalder (USA)	October 2, 1984 (aged 30)

Rider	Date of birth
Liza Rachetto (USA)	January 30, 1974 (aged 40)
Megan Rathwell (CAN)	September 28, 1984 (aged 30)
Shoshauna Routley (CAN)	October 22, 1986 (aged 28)
Rhae-Christie Shaw (CAN)	November 20, 1975 (aged 39)
Jessica Uebelhart (SUI)	October 16, 1990 (aged 24)
Erica Zaveta (USA)	September 6, 1989 (aged 25)

== Major wins ==
2015
1st Stage 2 (ITT) Redlands Bicycle Classic, Rhae-Christie Shaw
