= Amber Pierce =

American racing cyclist

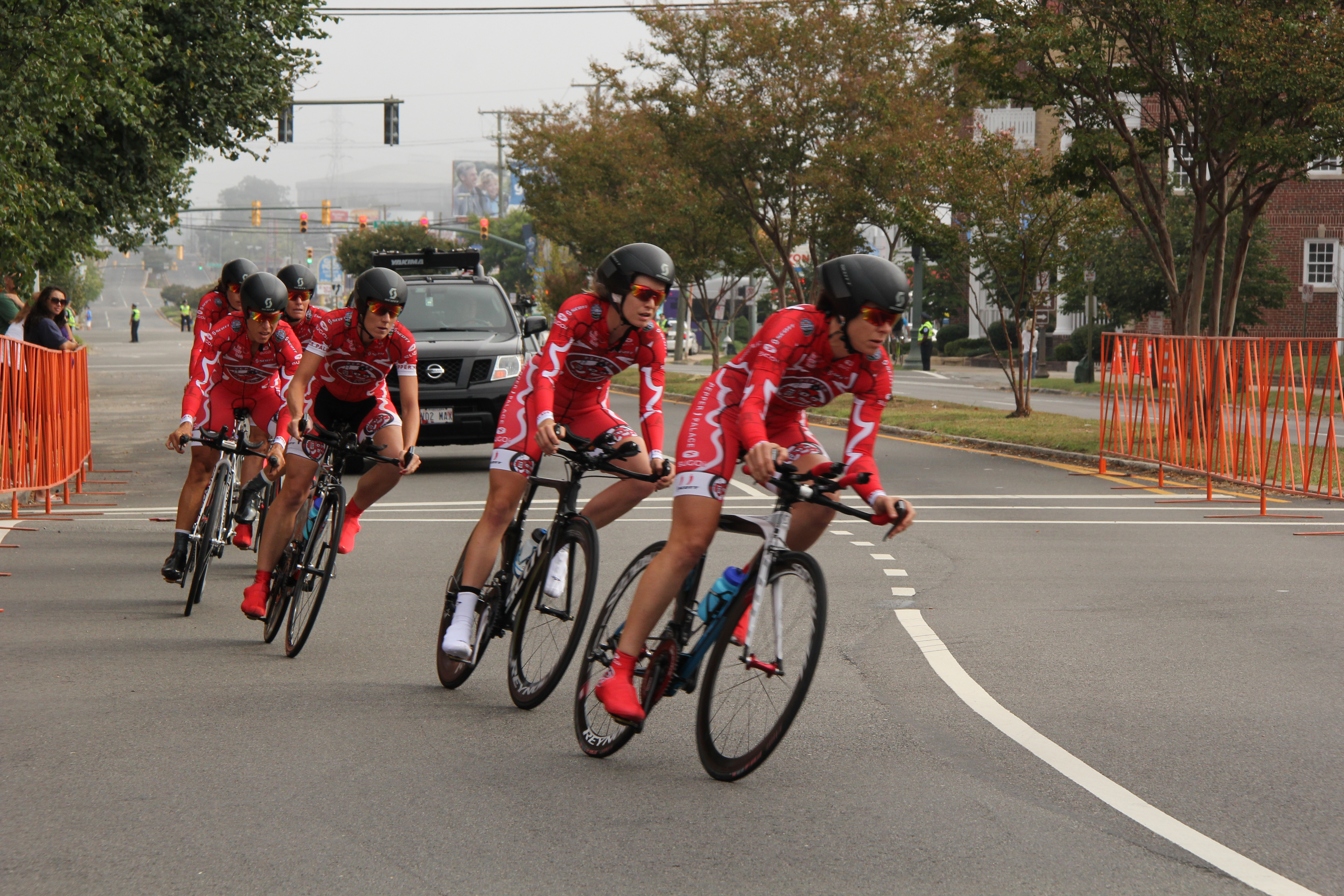
- Riding with her team at the 2015 UCI Road World Championships

Personal information
- Full name: Amber Pierce (Rais)
- Born: March 25, 1981 (age 45) Berkeley, California, United States

Cycling career
- Sport: Cycling
- Current team: Cannondale
- Discipline: Road
- Role: Rider
- Rider type: Domestique

Amateur team
- 2005: Stanford Cycling Team

Professional teams
- 2006–2007: Webcor Cycling (USA)
- 2008–2009: Team TIBCO (USA)
- 2010: Kuota Speed Kueens (AUT)
- 2011–2013: Diadora-Pasta Zara (ITA)
- 2014: Optum p/b Kelly Benefit Strategies(USA)
- 2015: Pepper Palace (USA)
- 2016: Team Vitalogic (AUT)
- 2017: Colavita Bianchi (USA)
- 2018: Cannondale MAVIC

Major wins
- Collegiate National Champion 2005

Amber Pierce (née Rais; born March 25, 1981) is an American professional racing cyclist.

Pierce began her sporting career as a swimmer, breaking state and national records whilst still at high school. She earned an athletic scholarship to Stanford University to compete for their NCAA Division 1 women's varsity swim team. Following a shoulder injury, Amber began cycling and joined the Stanford Cycling Team. She has a B.A. in Human Biology and an M.S. in Earth Systems from Stanford University.

After graduating in 2006 with her master's degree, she moved to Austria, where she lived and raced full-time on the World-Cup circuit in Europe from 2007 to 2013. Amber became internationally recognized as a respected domestique in the pro peloton and helped her American compatriots earn Olympic berths whilst racing for the US National Team. Upon returning to America in 2014, she continued racing internationally as a pro for both American and European UCI World Tour teams.

In 2018 she retired from full-time road racing but continues to represent and compete for Cannondale. She also co-hosts the Ask A Cycling Coach Podcast presented by TrainerRoad.

== Major results ==
2005
1st Collegiate National Championship Criterium
1st Collegiate National Championship Omnium
1st West Coast Cycling Conference Championship Criterium
1st West Coast Cycling Conference Championship Omnium
1st California Cup Series Omnium
1st NCNCA Criterium District Champion
1st Mt Hamilton Classic Road Race
1st Suisun Harbor Criterium
1st Giro di San Francisco

2006
1st Stage 5, Awbrey Butte Road Race, Cascade Classic
1st Stage 2, Gibbs Lighthouse Time Trial, Bermuda Grand Prix
1st Snelling Road Race
1st Land Park Criterium
1st University Road Race
1st Patterson Pass Road Race
1st Suisun Harbor Criterium
1st Esparto Time Trial
1st California Cup Series Omnium
2nd San Ardo Road Race
3rd U.S. Women's Prestige Series Best Young Rider Classification
3rd Stage 3, Mt Hood Cycling Classic
3rd QOM Classification, Cascade Cycling Classic
3rd Nevada City Classic

2007
1st General Classification, Tri Peaks Challenge
1st Stage 1, Mt Magazine Road Race, Tri Peaks Challenge
1st Stage 2, Epic Road Race, Tri Peaks Challenge
1st Stage 4, Individual Time Trial, Tri Peaks Challenge
1st Stage 1, Team Time Trial, International Tour de 'Toona
1st Cougar Mountain Classic Circuit Race
2nd Stage 5, Gila Monster Road Race, Tour of the Gila
3rd Stage 6, Blair County Road Race (Blue Knob), International Tour de 'Toona
3rd Quad Knopf Exeter Individual Time Trial, Sequoia Cycling Classic
3rd Stage 3, Tech Criterium, Tri Peaks Challenge
4th General Classification, Tour of the Gila

2008
1st Stage 2, Inner Loop Road Race, Tour of the Gila
1st Stage 6, Awbrey Butte Road Race, Cascade Cycling Classic
1st Chicago Criterium
2nd Tour de Nez
Most Aggressive Rider, Stage 2, Nature Valley Grand Prix

2009
1st General Classification, Tour de Nez
1st Stages 1, Truckee Criterium, Tour de Nez
1st Stage 3, Northstar Circuit Race, Tour de Nez
2nd Stage 2, Reno Criterium, Tour de Nez
4th Individual Time Trial, U.S. National Championships

2010
1st Bischofshofen Kriterium, AUT
1st Schwaz Strasserennen, AUT
1st Schwaz Kriterium, AUT
1st Deutschlandsberg Strasserennen, AUT
1st Deutschlandsberg Kriterium, AUT
1st Hans Jöchl Einzelzeitfahren, AUT
2nd General Classification, Langenlois Rundfahrt AUT
2nd Stage 1 Einzelzeitfahren, Langenlois Rundfahrt AUT
2nd Schwaz Bergrennen, AUT
3rd Stage 2 Strasserennen, Langenlois Rundfahrt AUT
3rd Rieder Radrennen Kriterium, AUT
3rd Stage 3 individual time trial, Fitchburg Longsjo Classic USA
4th Stage 1 circuit race, Fitchburg Longsjo Classic USA
5th General Classification, Fitchburg Longsjo Classic USA
15th General Classification, Giro Trentino ITA

2011
1st Tour de Nez USA
8th Stage 2, Tour of New Zealand

== Sporting Honors ==
Shirley Schoof Club Sports Athlete of the Year, Stanford Athletic Department
Athletic Hall of Fame, Reno High School
2x Collegiate National Champion, Stanford Cycling Team
2x Collegiate Conference Champion, Stanford Cycling Team
NCAA Division I Scholarship Athlete, Stanford Women’s Swimming
Pac-10 Swimming All-Academic Honorable Mention
Multi-time State Champion and National Champion, USA Swimming
Three-time Junior National Champion and record-holder, USA Swimming
Multi-time State Champion and record-holder, Reno High School Swimming
Four-time National High School All-American, Reno High School Swimming

== Academic Honors ==
Published author of two peer-reviewed scientific journal articles (h-index = 2)
President’s Scholar, Stanford University
M.Sc., Stanford University
B.A., Stanford University
Valedictorian, Reno High School
