= 2015 Tour Femenino de San Luis =

Race details
- Dates: 11–16 January
- Stages: 6
- Distance: 371.5 km (230.8 mi)
- Winning time: 9h 52' 48"

Results
Jersey awarded to the overall winner	Winner	Janildes Fernandes (BRA)	(Brazil (national team))
	Second	Lauren Stephens (USA)	(Team TIBCO–SVB)
	Third	Ana Paula Polegatch (BRA)	(Brazil (national team))
Jersey awarded to the mountains classification winner	Mountains	Katie Hall (USA)	(UnitedHealthcare)
Jersey awarded to the youth classification winner	Youth	Hannah Barnes (GBR)	(UnitedHealthcare)
Jersey awarded to the sprints classification winner	Sprints	Elena Cecchini (ITA)	(Italy (national team))
	Team	Brazil (national team)	

The 2015 Tour Femenino de San Luis was the second edition of the Tour Femenino de San Luis, a stage race held in the San Luis province in Argentina. A 2.2-rated, UCI-sanctioned event, the race was held between 11 and 16 January. It was the first race of the 2015 Women's Elite cycling calendar and mirrored the men's cycling event, the Tour de San Luis. The race was won by Janildes Fernandes, riding for a Brazilian national team.

== Teams ==
UCI Women's Teams

- Alé–Cipollini
- Itau Shimano Ladies Power Team
- Servetto Footon
- Team TIBCO–SVB
- UnitedHealthcare
- Xirayas de San Luis

Club teams

- Acimproba–Orbai
- Argentino–Mixto
- Bianchi–Peugeot
- Bontrager
- Brunetta Bike
- Coach–Yaco
- Funvic
- Latinoamericano–Ray
- Neuquin
- Stemax Sports

National teams

- Brazil
- Colombia
- Cuba
- Italy

== Stages ==
=== Stage 1 ===
11 January 2015 – El Durazno to El Durazno, 80.2 km (49.8 mi)

Stage 1 Result

	Rider	Team	Time
1	Hannah Barnes (GBR)	UnitedHealthcare	2h 12' 08"
2	Elena Cecchini (ITA)	Italy (national team)	+ 0"
3	Michela Pavin (ITA)	Servetto Footon	+ 0"
4	Talia Ayelen Aguirre (ARG)	Xirayas de San Luis	+ 0"
5	Arianna Fidanza (ITA)	Alé–Cipollini	+ 0"
6	Kendall Ryan (USA)	Team TIBCO–SVB	+ 0"
7	Veronica Cornolti (ITA)	Servetto Footon	+ 0"
8	Mailin Sánchez (CUB)	Cuba (national team)	+ 0"
9	Diana Peñuela (COL)	Coach–Yaco	+ 0"
10	Luciene Ferreira da Silva (BRA)	Funvic	+ 0"

General Classification after Stage 1

	Rider	Team	Time
1	Hannah Barnes (GBR)	UnitedHealthcare	2h 11' 53"
2	Elena Cecchini (ITA)	Italy (national team)	+ 9"
3	Michela Pavin (ITA)	Servetto Footon	+ 11"
4	Jessenia Meneses (COL)	Itau Shimano Ladies Power Team	+ 12"
5	Arianna Fidanza (ITA)	Alé–Cipollini	+ 13"
6	Clemilda Fernandes (BRA)	Brazil (national team)	+ 14"
7	Iraida García (CUB)	Cuba (national team)	+ 14"
8	Talia Ayelen Aguirre (ARG)	Xirayas de San Luis	+ 15"
9	Kendall Ryan (USA)	Team TIBCO–SVB	+ 15"
10	Veronica Cornolti (ITA)	Servetto Footon	+ 15"

=== Stage 2 ===
12 January 2015 – Villa Mercedes to Villa Mercedes, 69.1 km (42.9 mi)

Stage 2 Result

	Rider	Team	Time
1	Hannah Barnes (GBR)	UnitedHealthcare	1h 55' 20"
2	Paola Muñoz (CHI)	Bontrager	+ 0"
3	Arianna Fidanza (ITA)	Alé–Cipollini	+ 0"
4	Luciene Ferreira da Silva (BRA)	Funvic	+ 0"
5	Anna Zita Maria Stricker (ITA)	Italy (national team)	+ 0"
6	Iraida García (CUB)	Cuba (national team)	+ 0"
7	Lauren Stephens (USA)	Team TIBCO–SVB	+ 0"
8	Julia Sanchez Parma (ARG)	Itau Shimano Ladies Power Team	+ 0"
9	Scotti Wilborne (USA)	UnitedHealthcare	+ 0"
10	Daniela Lionço (BRA)	Brazil (national team)	+ 0"

General Classification after Stage 2

	Rider	Team	Time
1	Hannah Barnes (GBR)	UnitedHealthcare	4h 07' 03"
2	Elena Cecchini (ITA)	Italy (national team)	+ 11"
3	Arianna Fidanza (ITA)	Alé–Cipollini	+ 16"
4	Paola Muñoz (CHI)	Bontrager	+ 19"
5	Michela Pavin (ITA)	Servetto Footon	+ 21"
6	Jessenia Meneses (COL)	Itau Shimano Ladies Power Team	+ 22"
7	Veronica Cornolti (ITA)	Servetto Footon	+ 24"
8	Iraida García (CUB)	Cuba (national team)	+ 24"
9	Elena Kuchinskaya (RUS)	Servetto Footon	+ 24"
10	Luciene Ferreira da Silva (BRA)	Funvic	+ 25"

=== Stage 3 ===
13 January 2015 – Merlo to Merlo, 63.4 km (39.4 mi)

Stage 3 Result

	Rider	Team	Time
1	Iraida García (CUB)	Cuba (national team)	1h 43' 09"
2	Clemilda Fernandes (BRA)	Brazil (national team)	+ 0"
3	Paola Muñoz (CHI)	Bontrager	+ 3"
4	Elena Cecchini (ITA)	Italy (national team)	+ 4"
5	Sindra Narváez (COL)	Colombia (national team)	+ 4"
6	Kristabel Doebel-Hickok (USA)	Team TIBCO–SVB	+ 4"
7	Fernanda da Silva (BRA)	Funvic	+ 4"
8	Lex Albrecht (CAN)	Xirayas de San Luis	+ 4"
9	Maria Fadiga (ARG)	Bianchi–Peugeot	+ 4"
10	Lorena Vargas (COL)	Colombia (national team)	+ 4"

General Classification after Stage 3

	Rider	Team	Time
1	Hannah Barnes (GBR)	UnitedHealthcare	5h 50' 13"
2	Elena Cecchini (ITA)	Italy (national team)	+ 11"
3	Iraida García (CUB)	Cuba (national team)	+ 13"
4	Arianna Fidanza (ITA)	Alé–Cipollini	+ 15"
5	Paola Muñoz (CHI)	Bontrager	+ 17"
6	Clemilda Fernandes (BRA)	Brazil (national team)	+ 17"
7	Elena Kuchinskaya (RUS)	Servetto Footon	+ 27"
8	Sindra Narváez (COL)	Colombia (national team)	+ 28"
9	Lauren Stephens (USA)	Team TIBCO–SVB	+ 28"
10	Janildes Fernandes (BRA)	Brazil (national team)	+ 28"

=== Stage 4 ===
14 January 2015 – El Durazno, 12.8 km (8.0 mi) individual time trial (ITT)

Stage 4 Result

	Rider	Team	Time
1	Lauren Stephens (USA)	Team TIBCO–SVB	18' 12"
2	Alison Tetrick (USA)	Xirayas de San Luis	+ 0"
3	Ana Paula Polegatch (BRA)	Brazil (national team)	+ 12"
4	Maria Carla Alvarez (ARG)	Xirayas de San Luis	+ 18"
5	Sérika Gulumá (COL)	Colombia (national team)	+ 22"
6	Valeria Müller (ARG)	Acimproba–Orbai	+ 23"
7	Inés Gutiérrez (ARG)	Coach–Yaco	+ 23"
8	Fernanda da Silva (BRA)	Funvic	+ 31"
9	Anika Todd (CAN)	Team TIBCO–SVB	+ 33"
10	Lex Albrecht (CAN)	Xirayas de San Luis	+ 35"

General Classification after Stage 4

	Rider	Team	Time
1	Lauren Stephens (USA)	Team TIBCO–SVB	6h 08' 53"
2	Alison Tetrick (USA)	Xirayas de San Luis	+ 0"
3	Ana Paula Polegatch (BRA)	Brazil (national team)	+ 12"
4	Maria Carla Alvarez (ARG)	Xirayas de San Luis	+ 18"
5	Fernanda da Silva (BRA)	Funvic	+ 31"
6	Lex Albrecht (CAN)	Xirayas de San Luis	+ 35"
7	Clemilda Fernandes (BRA)	Brazil (national team)	+ 40"
8	Sérika Gulumá (COL)	Colombia (national team)	+ 41"
9	Janildes Fernandes (BRA)	Brazil (national team)	+ 44"
10	Valeria Müller (ARG)	Acimproba–Orbai	+ 47"

=== Stage 5 ===
15 January 2015 – Villa de la Quebrada to Mirador del Potrero, 62.6 km (38.9 mi)

Stage 5 Result

	Rider	Team	Time
1	Katie Hall (USA)	UnitedHealthcare	1h 47' 19"
2	Janildes Fernandes (BRA)	Brazil (national team)	+ 0"
3	Uênia Fernandes de Souza (BRA)	Alé–Cipollini	+ 43"
4	Flávia Oliveira (BRA)	Alé–Cipollini	+ 45"
5	Scotti Wilborne (USA)	UnitedHealthcare	+ 45"
6	Kristabel Doebel-Hickok (USA)	Team TIBCO–SVB	+ 45"
7	Lauren Stephens (USA)	Team TIBCO–SVB	+ 55"
8	Ana Paula Polegatch (BRA)	Brazil (national team)	+ 58"
9	Valeria Müller (ARG)	Acimproba–Orbai	+ 1' 05"
10	Elena Cecchini (ITA)	Italy (national team)	+ 1' 15"

General Classification after Stage 5

	Rider	Team	Time
1	Janildes Fernandes (BRA)	Brazil (national team)	7h 57' 06"
2	Lauren Stephens (USA)	Team TIBCO–SVB	+ 1"
3	Ana Paula Polegatch (BRA)	Brazil (national team)	+ 16"
4	Katie Hall (USA)	UnitedHealthcare	+ 20"
5	Maria Carla Alvarez (ARG)	Xirayas de San Luis	+ 41"
6	Kristabel Doebel-Hickok (USA)	Team TIBCO–SVB	+ 57"
7	Flávia Oliveira (BRA)	Alé–Cipollini	+ 58"
8	Valeria Müller (ARG)	Acimproba–Orbai	+ 58"
9	Scotti Wilborne (USA)	UnitedHealthcare	+ 1' 07"
10	Alison Tetrick (USA)	Xirayas de San Luis	+ 1' 07"

=== Stage 6 ===
16 January 2015 – San Luis to San Luis, 83.4 km (51.8 mi)

Stage 6 Result

	Rider	Team	Time
1	Alison Tetrick (USA)	Xirayas de San Luis	1h 55' 29"
2	Paola Muñoz (CHI)	Bontrager	+ 15"
3	Hannah Barnes (GBR)	UnitedHealthcare	+ 16"
4	Arianna Fidanza (ITA)	Alé–Cipollini	+ 16"
5	Elena Cecchini (ITA)	Italy (national team)	+ 16"
6	Marta Tagliaferro (ITA)	Alé–Cipollini	+ 16"
7	Talia Ayelen Aguirre (ARG)	Xirayas de San Luis	+ 16"
8	Fernanda da Silva (BRA)	Funvic	+ 16"
9	Lorena Vargas (COL)	Colombia (national team)	+ 16"
10	Veronica Cornolti (ITA)	Servetto Footon	+ 16"

Final General Classification

	Rider	Team	Time
1	Janildes Fernandes (BRA)	Brazil (national team)	9h 52' 48"
2	Lauren Stephens (USA)	Team TIBCO–SVB	+ 8"
3	Ana Paula Polegatch (BRA)	Brazil (national team)	+ 26"
4	Katie Hall (USA)	UnitedHealthcare	+ 30"
5	Alison Tetrick (USA)	Xirayas de San Luis	+ 44"
6	Maria Carla Alvarez (ARG)	Xirayas de San Luis	+ 51"
7	Flávia Oliveira (BRA)	Alé–Cipollini	+ 1' 01"
8	Kristabel Doebel-Hickok (USA)	Team TIBCO–SVB	+ 1' 07"
9	Valeria Müller (ARG)	Acimproba–Orbai	+ 1' 08"
10	Scotti Wilborne (USA)	UnitedHealthcare	+ 1' 10"

== Classification leadership table ==
In the 2015 Tour Femenino de San Luis, six different jerseys were awarded. For the general classification, calculated by adding each cyclist's finishing times on each stage, and allowing time bonuses at intermediate sprints and for the first three finishers on mass-start stages, the leader received a pink jersey. This classification was considered the most important of the 2015 Tour Femenino de San Luis, and the winner of the classification was considered the winner of the race. Additionally, there was a sprints classification, which awarded a green jersey. In the sprints classification, cyclists received points for finishing in the top 3 at intermediate sprint points during each stage, on a 3–2–1 scale.

There was also a mountains classification, the leadership of which was marked by a red and white polka-dot jersey. In the mountains classification, points were won by reaching the top of a climb before other cyclists. Each climb was categorised as either first, second, or third-category, with more points available for the higher-categorised climbs. For first-category climbs, points were awarded on a scale of 10 points for first across the climb, second place earned 8 points, third 6, fourth 4, fifth 2 and sixth 1. Second-category climbs awarded points on a scale of 6 points for first place, second place earned 4 points, third 2, and fourth 1. Third-category climbs awarded points to the top three riders only; 3 points for first across the climb, second place earned 2 points, third place earned 1 point.

The fourth jersey represented the young rider classification, marked by a yellow jersey. This was decided the same way as the general classification, but only riders born after 1 January 1993 were eligible to be ranked in the classification. There was also classifications for the highest-placed Argentine rider and the highest-placed rider from the San Luis province, with the leaderships marked by a cyan jersey and an orange and white polka-dot jersey respectively.

Lastly, there was a classification for teams, in which the times of the best three cyclists per team on each stage were added together; the leading team at the end of the race was the team with the lowest total time.

Stage	Winner	General classification	Young rider classification	Sprint classification	Mountain classification	Argentinian rider classification	Team classification
1	Hannah Barnes	Hannah Barnes	Hannah Barnes	Hannah Barnes	Camila Ferreira	Talia Ayelen Aguirre	Servetto Footon
2	Hannah Barnes	Hannah Barnes	Hannah Barnes	Elena Cecchini	Camila Ferreira	Julia Sanchez Parma	Servetto Footon
3	Iraida García	Hannah Barnes	Hannah Barnes	Elena Cecchini	Camila Ferreira	Estefania Pilz	Brazil (national team)
4	Lauren Stephens	Lauren Stephens	Hannah Barnes	Elena Cecchini	Camila Ferreira	Maria Carla Alvarez	Xirayas de San Luis
5	Katie Hall	Janildes Fernandes	Hannah Barnes	Elena Cecchini	Katie Hall	Maria Carla Alvarez	Brazil (national team)
6	Alison Tetrick	Janildes Fernandes	Hannah Barnes	Elena Cecchini	Katie Hall	Maria Carla Alvarez	Brazil (national team)
Final		Janildes Fernandes	Hannah Barnes	Elena Cecchini	Katie Hall	Maria Carla Alvarez	Brazil (national team)

== See also ==
- 2015 in women's road cycling
