= 2015 Gran Prix San Luis Femenino =

Race details
- Dates: 10 January 2015
- Stages: 1
- Distance: 76.5 km (47.5 mi)
- Winning time: 2h 02' 29"

Results
	Winner	Hannah Barnes (GBR)	(UnitedHealthcare)
	Second	Luciene Ferreira da Silva (BRA)	(Funvic)
	Third	Clemilda Fernandes (BRA)	(Brazil (national team))

The 2015 Gran Prix San Luis Femenino was the third edition of a one-day women's cycle race held in Argentina on January 10, 2015. The race had a UCI rating of 1.2.

== Teams ==
UCI Women's Teams

- Alé–Cipollini
- Itau Shimano Ladies Power Team
- Servetto Footon
- Team TIBCO–SVB
- UnitedHealthcare

Club teams

- Acimproba–Orbai
- Argentino–Mixto
- Bianchi–Peugeot
- Bontrager
- Brunetta Bike
- Coach–Yaco
- Funvic
- Latinoamericano–Ray
- Neuquin
- Stemax Sports
- Xirayas de San Luis

National teams

- Brazil
- Colombia
- Cuba
- Italy

== Results ==
	Rider	Team	Time
1	Hannah Barnes (GBR)	UnitedHealthcare	2h 02' 29"
2	Luciene Ferreira da Silva (BRA)	Funvic	+ 0"
3	Clemilda Fernandes (BRA)	Brazil (national team)	+ 0"
4	Janildes Fernandes (BRA)	Brazil (national team)	+ 0"
5	Fernanda da Silva (BRA)	Funvic	+ 0"
6	Lauren Stephens (USA)	Team TIBCO–SVB	+ 0"
7	Elena Cecchini (ITA)	Italy (national team)	+ 0"
8	Lorena Vargas (COL)	Colombia (national team)	+ 0"
9	Veronica Cornolti (ITA)	Servetto Footon	+ 0"
10	Claudia Barco (CUB)	Cuba (national team)	+ 0"

== See also ==
- 2015 in women's road cycling
