= List of 2014 professional women's cycling teams =

Listed below are UCI Women's Teams and elite professional women's teams (non-UCI Women's teams) that compete in 2014 women's road cycling events organized by the International Cycling Union (UCI).

== UCI Women's Teams ==
The country designation of each team is determined by the country of registration of the largest number of its riders, and is not necessarily the country where the team is registered or based.

The 2014 UCI Women's Teams were:

Code	Official Team Name	Country	Website
ALE	Alé–Cipollini (2014 season)	Italy	alecipolliniteam.com
BPK	Astana BePink Women's Team (2014 season)	Italy	bepink.eu
BCT	Bigla Cycling Team (2014 season)	Switzerland	bigla-cycling-team.ch
BPD	Bizkaia–Durango (2014 season)	Spain	duranguesa.com
GPC	China Chongming–Giant–Champion System Pro Cycling (2014 season)	Hong Kong	
DLT	Boels–Dolmans (2014 season)	Netherlands	boelsdolmanscyclingteam.com
BTC	BTC City Ljubljana (2014 season)	Slovenia	kolesarke.si
EMF	Estado de México–Faren Kuota (2014 season)	Mexico	
FFT	Firefighters Upsala CK (2014 season)	Sweden	uppsalacykelcentrum.com
FDA	Forno d'Asolo–Astute (2014 season)	Lithuania	
FTZ	Futurumshop.nl–Zannata (2014 season)	Netherlands	futurumshop-zannata.com
HPU	Hitec Products (2014 season)	Norway	hitecproducts-uck.no
LKT	Lointek (2014 season)	Spain	equipociclistaugeraga.com
LBL	Lotto–Belisol Ladies (2014 season)	Belgium	lottobelisol.be
NOE	No Radunion Vitalogic (2014 season)	Austria	radteam.sportunion.at
OPW	Optum p/b Kelly Benefit Strategies (2014 season)	United States	optumprocycling.com
GEW	Orica–AIS (2014 season)	Australia	greenedgecycling.com
PHV	Parkhotel Valkenburg Continental Team (2014 season)	Netherlands	parkhotelvalkenburgct.nl
RBW	Rabobank-Liv Woman Cycling Team (2014 season)	Netherlands	raboliv.com
RVL	RusVelo (2014 season)	Russia	rusvelo.pro/en
MIC	S.C. Michela Fanini Rox (2014 season)	Italy	michelafanini.com
SEF	Servetto Footon (2014 season)	Italy	atbike.it
SLU	Specialized–lululemon (2014 season)	United States	velociosports.com
GIW	Team Giant–Shimano (2014 season)	Netherlands	1t4i.com
TRY	Team Rytger (2014 season)	Denmark	team-rytger.dk
TIB	Team TIBCO–To The Top (2014 season)	United States	teamtibco.com
TOG	Top Girls Fassa Bortolo (2014 season)	Italy	gstopgirls.com
VLL	Topsport Vlaanderen–Pro-Duo (2014 season)	Belgium	cyclingteam-damesvlaanderen.be
UHC	UnitedHealthcare Women's Team (2014 season)	United States	velociosports.com
VAI	Vaiano Fondriest (2014 season)	Italy	vcvaiano.com
FUT	Poitou–Charentes.Futuroscope.86 (2014 season)	France	cyclisme-vienne-futuroscope.fr
WHT	Wiggle–Honda (2014 season)	United Kingdom	wigglehonda.com

List updated 30 April 2014.

== Non-UCI Women's Teams ==
Teams listed here are elite professional teams, which are not UCI Women's teams. They are however invited to certain races such as Tour Femenino de San Luis and The Women's Tour.

List updated 26 May 2014

Code	Official Team Name	Country	Website
EWET	Autoglas Wetteren - Group Solar Cycling Team	Belgium	
EBIG	Big Mat - Auber'93	France	
	Brasileño Route Bike Ladies	Brazil	
ECOL	Colavita - Fine Cooking	United States	
GPC	DN-17 - Poitou Charentes	France	
EDNA	DNA Cycling p/b K4Racing	United States	
EEND	Endura Lady Force	Netherlands	
EBRE	Equipe DN Bretagne	France	
EEXG	Exergy Twenty16	United States	
EFCS	FCS Cycling Team	United States	
EFFE	Fearless Femme p/b Pure Energy	United States	
	Iscorp Intelligentsia	Thailand	
	Isorex Cycling Team	Belgium	
EKRE	Keukens Redant	Belgium	
EKLC	Koga Ladies - Central Rhede Cycling Team	Germany	
	Languedoc Roussillon Activ Atittud	France	
ELGF	Louis Garneau Factory Team	United States	
ENAP	Napoleon Games - St Martinus CT - Kerksken	Belgium	
EMFP	On The Drops.cc p/b Matrix	United Kingdom	
EPCN	Pedalea CON Nosostras	Colombia	
ECPN	People's Trust Ladies	Netherlands	
EPEP	Pepper Palace Pro Cycling Team	United States	
EJVA	RC Jan van Arckel	Netherlands	
ERES	Restore Cycling	Netherlands	
ERMD	Ronald McDonald Huis - Groningen Wielerploeg	Netherlands	
ESAS	SAS-Mazda-Macogep p/b Specialized	Canada	
	Starley Primal Pro Cycling Team	United Kingdom	
ESTE	Stevens - The Cyclery Can	Canada	
ES1A	Stevens-Hytera	Germany	
ESWA	Swaboladies.nl	Netherlands	
EMXX	Team Maxx Solar Cycling	Germany	
ESTU	Team Stuttgart	Germany	
	Team Velosport - Pasta Montegrappa	United Kingdom	
EVDK	Vanderkitten	United States	
EWLD	Water, Land en Dijken	Netherlands	
ESPM	Wielerclub De Sprinters Malderen	Belgium	
	WV Breda - Manieu.nl - Ladiesteam	Netherlands	
EZIM	Zimmer Capital p/b Foundation	United States	

== See also ==
- 2014 in women's road cycling
