= Fernanda Yapura =

Argentine professional road cyclist

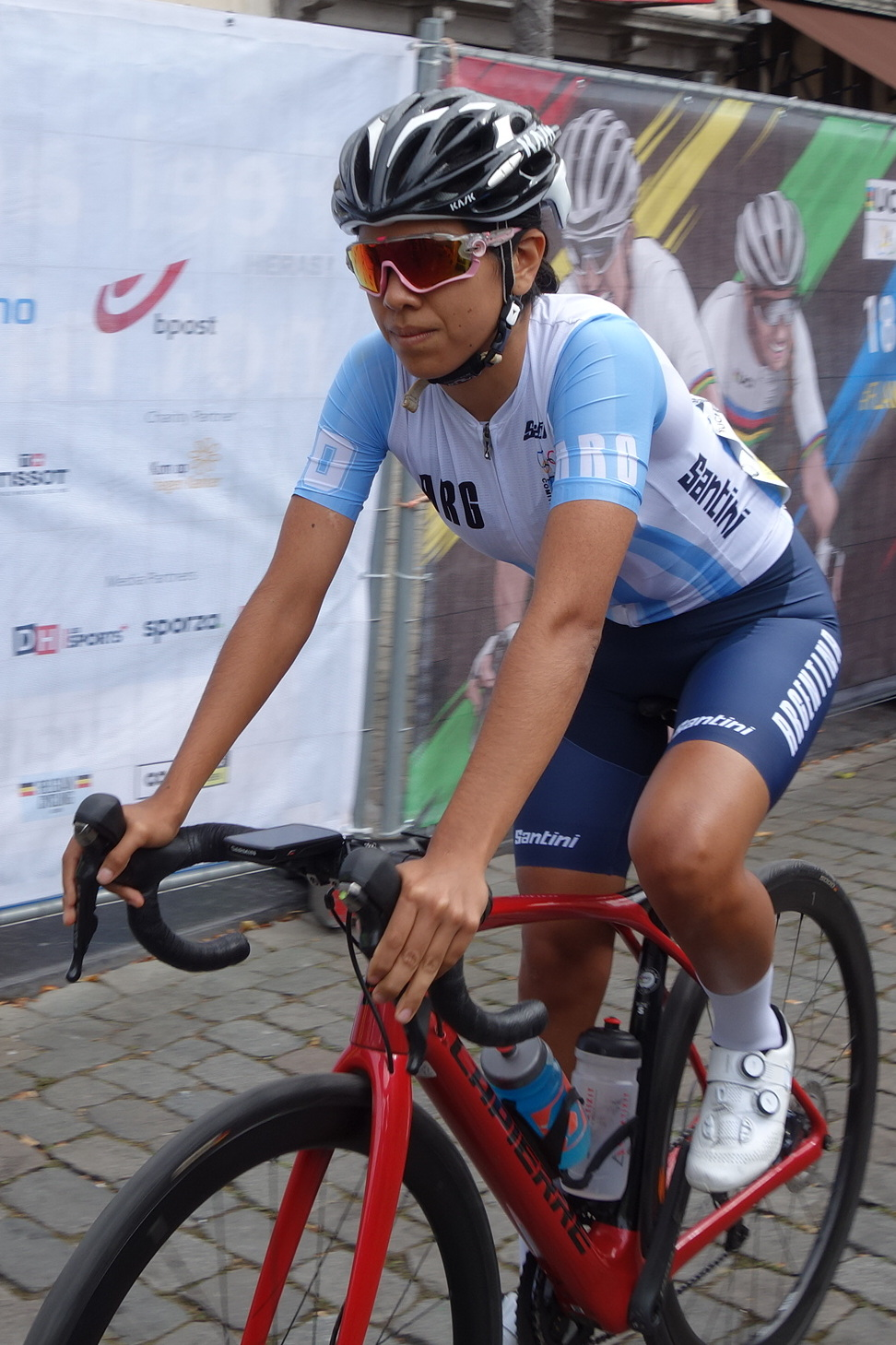
- Yapura at the 2021 World Championships

Personal information
- Full name: Anabel María Fernanda Yapura Plaza
- Born: 6 May 1998 (age 28) Rosario de Lerma

Cycling career
- Sport: Cycling
- Current team: Team Macadam Cowboys
- Discipline: Road
- Role: Rider

Amateur teams
- 2016: Escuela Ciclismo Fundación Nova
- 2018: UCI WCC Women's Team
- 2020–: CM Aubervilliers 93–Saint-Michel

Professional teams
- 2017: Weber Shimano Ladies Power
- 2019: WCC Team

Anabel María Fernanda Yapura Plaza (born 6 May 1998) is an Argentine road cyclist, who currently rides for French amateur team CM Aubervilliers 93–Saint-Michel. She has competed since 2016, ranking sixth in the Argentinian National Championships for the individual time trial and sixteenth in the road race.

== Career ==
In 2015, Yapura collected a bronze medal in the Mirador del Sol Challenge as an amateur, while the following year she competed in the Gran Prix San Luis Femenino, a UCI 1.2 ranked event, for Escuela Ciclismo Fundación Nova, though she did not finish the race. Later that year she took part in the Tour Femenino de San Luis, a 2.1 ranked event, in which she placed 55th in the general classification, but 11th in the youth classification. In April 2016, she competed in the Argentine national road cycling championships, finishing sixth in the individual time trial and sixteenth in the road race. She joined the Weber Shimano Ladies Power team for 2017, racing as part of their team for both the SwissEver GP Cham – Hagendorn, where she placed 41st, and the Vuelta a Colombia Femenina Oro y Paz, a UCI 2.2 ranked event, in which she finished 13th in the mountains classification.

== Major results ==
2019
6th Time trial, Pan American Games
