= Kristabel Doebel-Hickok =

American cyclist

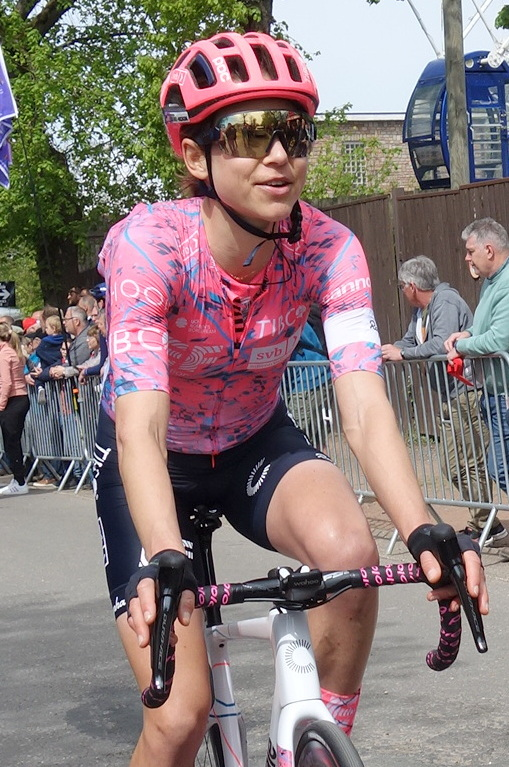
- Doebel-Hickok at La Flèche Wallonne in 2022

Personal information
- Full name: Kristabel Doebel-Hickok
- Nickname: Krista
- Born: April 28, 1989 (age 37) Marina del Rey, California, United States

Cycling career
- Sport: Cycling
- Discipline: Road
- Rider type: Climber

Professional teams
- 2014–2015: Team TIBCO–To The Top
- 2016–2018: Cylance Pro Cycling
- 2019–2021: Rally UHC Cycling
- 2022–2023: EF Education–Tibco–SVB
- 2024: Human Powered Health

Kristabel Doebel-Hickok (born April 28, 1989) is an American former professional racing cyclist, who last rode for UCI Women's WorldTeam Human Powered Health.

== Major results ==
2015
1st Stage 5 Tour Cycliste Féminin International de l'Ardèche
4th Overall Tour de Feminin-O cenu Českého Švýcarska

1st Stage 5

8th Overall Tour Femenino de San Luis
2016
9th Philadelphia Cycling Classic
2017
4th Overall Tour of California
4th Giro del Trentino Alto Adige-Südtirol
7th Giro dell'Emilia Internazionale Donne Elite
10th Overall Tour of the Gila
2019
3rd Grand Prix Cycliste de Gatineau
4th Overall Women's Tour Down Under
4th Overall Tour of the Gila
5th Overall Joe Martin Stage Race
5th Overall Colorado Classic
7th Overall Tour of California
8th Overall Kreiz Breizh Elites Dames
2020
3rd Trophée des Grimpeuses
2021
1st Mountains classification Setmana Ciclista Valenciana
4th Road race, National Road Championships
10th Clasica Femenina Navarra
2022
1st Overall Tour Féminin des Pyrénées

1st Points classification
1st Mountains classification
1st Stage 1a, 1b & 2

2nd Overall Tour of the Gila

1st Stages 1 & 3 (ITT)
1st Mountains classification

4th Overall Vuelta a Burgos Feminas
7th Emakumeen Nafarroako Klasikoa
8th La Flèche Wallonne Féminine
2023
5th Overall Women's Tour Down Under
9th Cadel Evans Great Ocean Road Race
