= Tour Femenino de San Luis =

Argentine multi-day road cycling race

Race details
- Date: January
- Region: Argentina
- Discipline: Road
- Type: Stage race

History
- First edition: 2014
- Editions: 3
- Final edition: 2016
- First winner: Alison Powers (USA)
- Most wins: No repeat winners
- Final winner: Katie Hall (USA)

Tour Femenino de San Luis is a women's staged cycle race which takes place in San Luis, Argentina.

== Overall winners ==
Year	Winner	Second	Third
2014	(United States) Alison Powers	(Brazil) Fernanda da Silva	(Brazil) Clemilda Fernandes
2015	(Brazil) Janildes Fernandes	(United States) Lauren Stephens	(Brazil) Ana Paula Polegatch
2016	(United States) Katie Hall	(Poland) Małgorzata Jasińska	(Cuba) Arlenis Sierra

== Jerseys ==
As of the 2015 edition:

denotes the overall race leader
denotes the highest placed rider who is under 23 years of age
denotes the mountains classification.
denotes he leader of the sprint competition
denotes the highest placed Argentinian rider

Previous classifications

In 2014 this jersey represented the combination classification leader
