= Katie Hall (cyclist) =

American bicycle racer (born 1987)

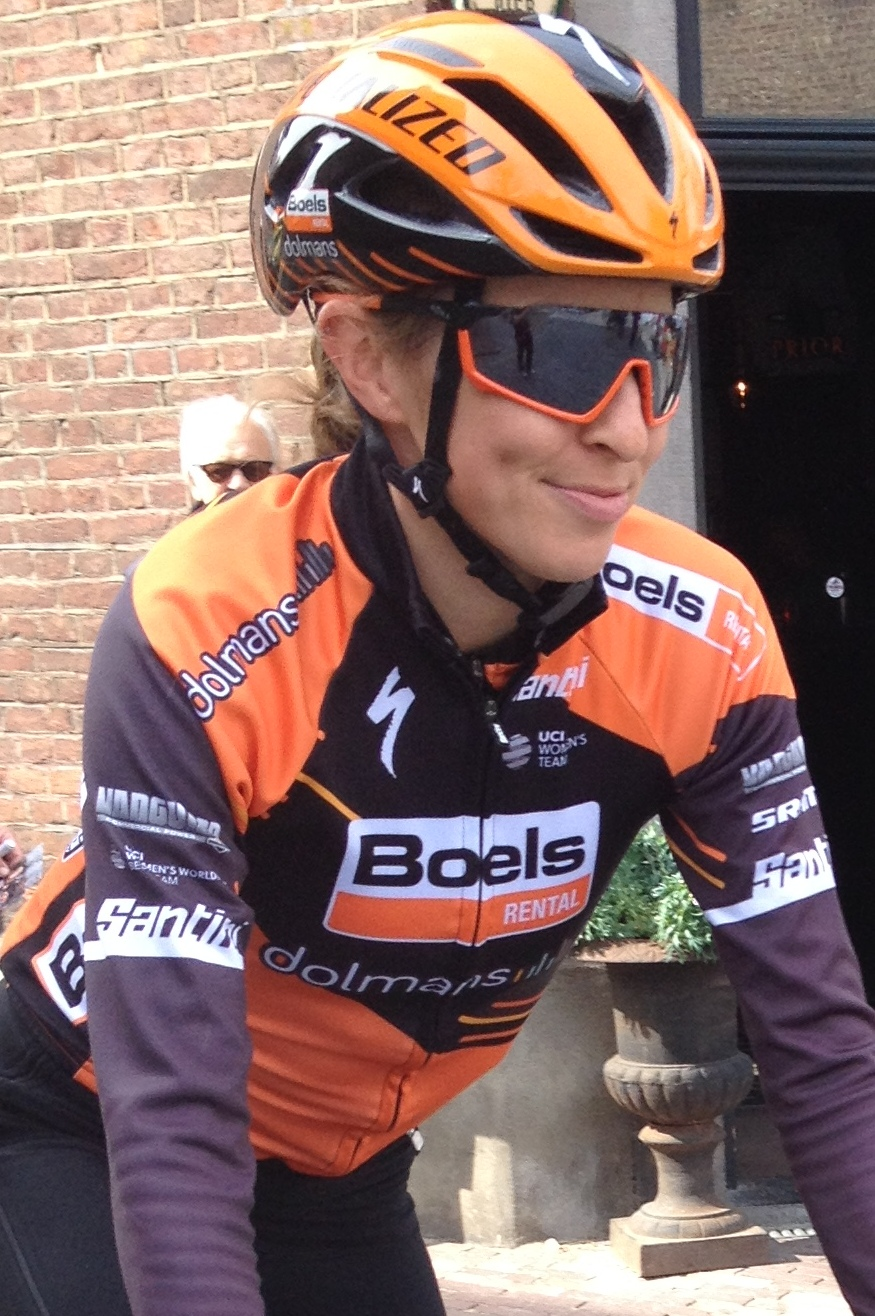
- Hall at the 2019 Volta Limburg Classic

Personal information
- Full name: Katharine Hall
- Nickname: Katie
- Born: January 6, 1987 (age 39) Mercer Island, Washington, United States
- Height: 5 ft 4 in (163 cm)
- Weight: 52 kg (115 lb)

Cycling career
- Sport: Cycling
- Current team: Retired
- Discipline: Road
- Role: Rider
- Rider type: All-rounder

Amateur teams
- Metromint Cycling
- Cal Cycling (University of California, Berkeley)

Professional teams
- 2014–2018: UnitedHealthcare
- 2019–2020: Boels–Dolmans

Major wins
- Stage races Tour Femenino de San Luis (2016)

Katharine Hall (born January 6, 1987) is an American former professional cyclist, who rode professionally between 2014 and 2020, for the UnitedHealthcare, and Boels–Dolmans teams.

== Personal life ==
Hall attended Pomona College, graduating in 2009. In 2015, Hall graduated from the University of California, Berkeley with a Master of Science (MS) degree in molecular toxicology.

== Major results ==
2013
1st Mt. Tam Hill Climb
1st Three Summits Road Race, Mt. Hood Cycling Classic
1st Esparto Time Trial
1st Patterson Pass Road Race
2nd Vacaville Grand Prix
3rd Oakland Grand Prix
4th Road race, National Collegiate Road Championships
4th Giro di San Francisco
2014
1st Nevada City Classic Bicycle Race
2nd Wente Vineyards Classic Road Race and Criterium
3rd Snelling Road Race
5th Road race, National Road Championships
6th Grand Prix el Salvador
2015
1st Stage 6 Thüringen Rundfahrt der Frauen
2nd Overall Tour of the Gila
4th Overall Tour of California

1st Stage 1

4th Overall Redlands Bicycle Classic
4th Overall Tour Femenino de San Luis

1st Mountains classification
1st Stage 5

2016
1st Overall Tour Femenino de San Luis

1st Mountains classification
1st Stage 5

1st Mountains classification The Women's Tour
6th Overall Tour of the Gila
7th Overall Tour of California
2017
2nd Overall Tour of the Gila

1st Mountains classification
1st Stages 1 & 5

2nd Overall Tour of California

1st Mountains classification
1st Stage 2

6th Overall Joe Martin Stage Race
10th Overall Tour de Feminin-O cenu Českého Švýcarska
2018
1st Overall Tour of California

1st Mountains classification
1st Stage 2

1st Overall Colorado Classic

1st Stage 2 (ITT)

1st Overall Joe Martin Stage Race

1st Stage 3 (ITT)

1st Overall Tour of the Gila

1st Stage 1

1st Overall Redlands Bicycle Classic

1st Stage 2

5th Overall Tour Cycliste Féminin International de l'Ardèche
7th La Course by Le Tour de France
9th Overall Tour de Feminin-O cenu Českého Švýcarska

1st Mountains classification

2019
2nd Overall Tour of California

1st Stage 2

7th Overall Giro Rosa
8th Overall Setmana Ciclista Valenciana
8th Overall Colorado Classic
2020
6th Overall Setmana Ciclista Valenciana
