= Janelle Cole =

American cyclist

Personal information
- Born: October 19, 1996 (age 29) Rockford, Michigan, United States

Cycling career
- Sport: Cycling
- Discipline: Road
- Role: Rider

Amateur teams
- 2012–2014: West Michigan Coast Riders
- 2015: Fearless Femme p/b Haute Wheel Racing
- 2019: Fast Chance Women's Cycling
- 2019: Landis–Trek (guest)
- 2019: LUX/Sideshow p/b Specialized (guest)

Professional teams
- 2016: Twenty16–Ridebiker
- 2017–2018: UnitedHealthcare

Janelle Cole (born October 19, 1996) is an American racing cyclist, who most recently rode for American amateur team Fast Chance Women's Cycling. Prior to her cycling career, Cole competed in inline speed skating. She finished seventh in the 2015 Tour of America's Dairyland, and was the best young rider at the 2017 Joe Martin Stage Race.

== See also ==
- List of 2016 UCI Women's Teams and riders
