= 2019 Giro Rosa =

2019 UCI Women's World Tour, race 14 of 23
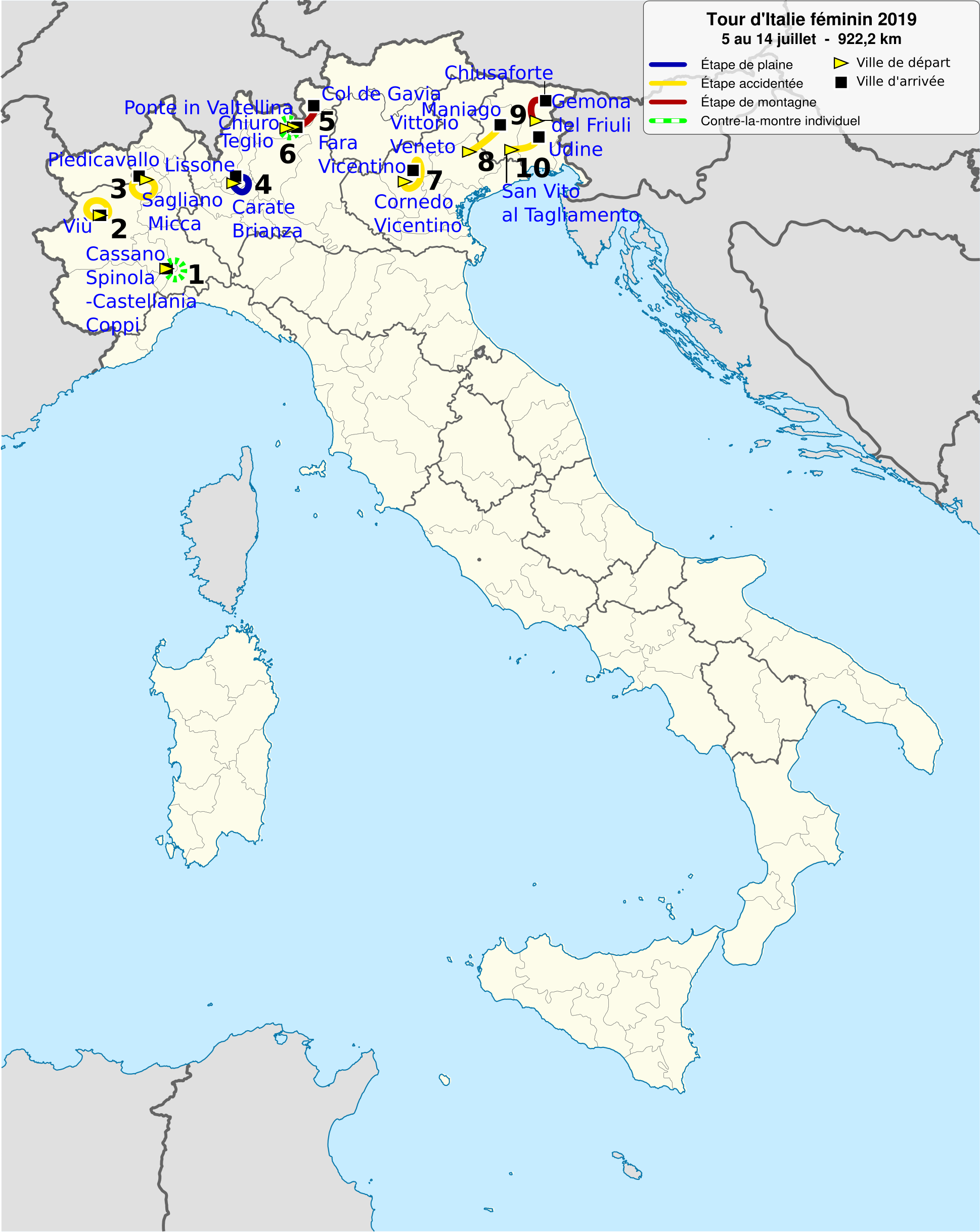
- Giro Rosa 2019 route

Race details
- Dates: 5–14 July 2018
- Stages: 10
- Distance: 905.8 km (562.8 mi)
- Winning time: 25h 01' 41"

Results
Jersey awarded to the overall winner	Winner	Annemiek van Vleuten (NED)	(Mitchelton–Scott)
	Second	Anna van der Breggen (NED)	(Boels–Dolmans)
	Third	Amanda Spratt (AUS)	(Mitchelton–Scott)
Jersey awarded to the points classification winner	Points	Annemiek van Vleuten (NED)	(Mitchelton–Scott)
Jersey awarded to the mountains classification winner	Mountains	Annemiek van Vleuten (NED)	(Mitchelton–Scott)
Jersey awarded to the young rider classification winner	Young rider	Juliette Labous (FRA)	(Team Sunweb)
Jersey awarded to the team classification winner	Team	WNT–Rotor Pro Cycling	

The 30th women's Giro d'Italia, or Giro Rosa, was held from 5 to 14 July 2019. Raced over ten stages, it was considered the most prestigious stage race of the women's calendar. The defending champion, Annemiek van Vleuten, won the race.

== Teams ==
Twenty-four teams of up to six riders each took part in the race:

UCI Women's WorldTeams

- Alé–Cipollini
- Aromitalia–Basso Bikes–Vaiano
- Bepink
- Bigla Pro Cycling
- Bizkaia–Durango
- Boels–Dolmans
- BTC City Ljubljana
- Canyon//SRAM
- CCC - Liv
- Cogeas–Mettler–Look
- Conceria Zabri–Fanini
- Eurotarget–Bianchi–Vittoria
- FDJ Nouvelle-Aquitaine Futuroscope
- Lotto–Soudal Ladies
- Mitchelton–Scott
- Movistar Team
- Parkhotel Valkenburg
- Servetto–Piumate–Beltrami TSA
- Team Sunweb
- Team Virtu Cycling
- Top Girls Fassa Bortolo
- Trek–Segafredo
- Valcar–Cylance
- WNT–Rotor Pro Cycling

== Route ==
The race consisted of 10 stages totalling 905.8 km (562.8 mi), beginning in Cassano Spinola on 5 July with a team time trial and finishing in Udine on 14 July. Though originally 918.3 km (570.6 mi) in length, landslides forced the route of stage 5 to be rerouted.

Stage schedule
Stage	Date	Course	Distance	Type	Winner
1	5 July	Cassano Spinola to Castellania	18 km (11.2 mi)	Team time trial	Canyon–SRAM
2	6 July	Viù to Viù	78 km (48.5 mi)	Hilly stage	Marianne Vos (NED)
3	7 July	Sagliano Micca to Piedicavallo	104 km (64.6 mi)	Medium-mountain stage	Marianne Vos (NED)
4	8 July	Lissone to Carate Brianza	100 km (62.1 mi)	Flat stage	Letizia Borghesi (ITA)
5	9 July	Ponte in Valtellina to ~~Valfurva (Passo Gavia)~~ Lago di Cancano	~~100 km (62.1 mi)~~ 87.5 km (54.4 mi)	Mountain stage	Annemiek van Vleuten (NED)
6	10 July	Chiuro to Teglio	12 km (7.5 mi)	Individual time trial	Annemiek van Vleuten (NED)
7	11 July	Cornedo Vicentino to Fara Vicentino/San Giorgio di Perlena	128 km (79.5 mi)	Medium-mountain stage	Marianne Vos (NED)
8	12 July	Vittorio Veneto to Maniago	133.3 km (82.8 mi)	Hilly stage	Lizzy Banks (GBR)
9	13 July	Gemona to Chiusaforte/Malga Montasio	125 km (77.7 mi)	Mountain stage	Anna van der Breggen (NED)
10	14 July	San Vito al Tagliamento to Udine	120 km (74.6 mi)	Flat stage	Marianne Vos (NED)
Total		~~918.3 km (570.6 mi)~~ 905.8 km (562.8 mi)			

== Stages ==
=== Stage 1 ===
5 July 2019 — Cassano Spinola to Castellania, 18 km (11.2 mi), team time trial (TTT)

Stage 1 result
Rank	Team	Time
1	Canyon//SRAM	31' 41"
2	Bigla Pro Cycling	+ 24"
3	CCC - Liv	+ 45"
4	Mitchelton–Scott	+ 53"
5	Boels–Dolmans	+ 1' 04"
6	Trek–Segafredo	+ 1' 07"
7	Team Sunweb	+ 1' 20"
8	Movistar Team	+ 1' 41"
9	Team Virtu Cycling	+ 1' 45"
10	WNT–Rotor Pro Cycling	+ 1' 50"

General classification after Stage 1
Rank	Rider	Team	Time
1	Katarzyna Niewiadoma (POL)	Canyon//SRAM	31' 41"
2	Hannah Barnes (UK)	Canyon//SRAM	+ 0"
3	Omer Shapira (ISR)	Canyon//SRAM	+ 0"
4	Alena Amialiusik (BLR)	Canyon//SRAM	+ 0"
5	Leah Thomas (USA)	Bigla Pro Cycling	+ 24"
6	Cecilie Uttrup Ludwig (DEN)	Bigla Pro Cycling	+ 24"
7	Mikayla Harvey (NZL)	Bigla Pro Cycling	+ 24"
8	Elise Chabbey (SUI)	Bigla Pro Cycling	+ 24"
9	Ashleigh Moolman (RSA)	CCC - Liv	+ 45"
10	Marianne Vos (NED)	CCC - Liv	+ 45"

=== Stage 2 ===
6 July 2019 — Viù to Viù, 76.3 km (47.4 mi)

Stage 2 result
Rank	Rider	Team	Time
1	Marianne Vos (NED)	CCC - Liv	2h 15' 56"
2	Annemiek van Vleuten (NED)	Mitchelton–Scott	+ 0"
3	Lucinda Brand (NED)	Team Sunweb	+ 0"
4	Anna van der Breggen (NED)	Boels–Dolmans	+ 0"
5	Soraya Paladin (ITA)	Alé–Cipollini	+ 0"
6	Amanda Spratt (AUS)	Mitchelton–Scott	+ 0"
7	Ane Santesteban (ESP)	WNT–Rotor Pro Cycling	+ 0"
8	Katarzyna Niewiadoma (POL)	Canyon//SRAM	+ 0"
9	Elisa Longo Borghini (ITA)	Trek–Segafredo	+ 0"
10	Demi Vollering (NED)	Parkhotel Valkenburg	+ 0"

General classification after Stage 2
Rank	Rider	Team	Time
1	Katarzyna Niewiadoma (POL)	Canyon//SRAM	2h 47' 27"
2	Omer Shapira (ISR)	Canyon//SRAM	+ 12"
3	Alena Amialiusik (BLR)	Canyon//SRAM	+ 19"
4	Cecilie Uttrup Ludwig (DEN)	Bigla Pro Cycling	+ 24"
5	Marianne Vos (NED)	CCC - Liv	+ 35"
6	Ashleigh Moolman (RSA)	CCC - Liv	+ 45"
7	Annemiek van Vleuten (NED)	Mitchelton–Scott	+ 47"
8	Leah Thomas (USA)	Bigla Pro Cycling	+ 47"
9	Elise Chabbey (SWI)	Bigla Pro Cycling	+ 47"
10	Amanda Spratt (AUS)	Mitchelton–Scott	+ 53"

=== Stage 3 ===
7 July 2019 — Sagliano Micca to Piedicavallo, 104.1 km (64.7 mi)

After unsuccessful solo breakaway attempts by Eugenia Bujak and Tayler Wiles, Lucy Kennedy launched an attack at 2.5 km (1.6 mi) to go. She quickly opened up a gap and managed to keep it up the steep drag to the finish line. At 200 meter to go, the bunch was closing in and Marianne Vos launched her attack. Unaware of this, and with only a few meters left to the finish line, Kennedy thought she had won and started raising her arm in celebration. In extremis, Vos sped passed her to the stage victory, leaving Kennedy with second place.

Stage 3 result
Rank	Rider	Team	Time
1	Marianne Vos (NED)	CCC - Liv	2h 49' 11"
2	Lucy Kennedy (AUS)	Mitchelton–Scott	+ 0"
3	Cecilie Uttrup Ludwig (DEN)	Bigla Pro Cycling	+ 0"
4	Annemiek van Vleuten (NED)	Mitchelton–Scott	+ 0"
5	Ashleigh Moolman (RSA)	CCC - Liv	+ 0"
6	Lucinda Brand (NED)	Team Sunweb	+ 0"
7	Soraya Paladin (ITA)	Alé–Cipollini	+ 0"
8	Ane Santesteban (ESP)	WNT–Rotor Pro Cycling	+ 0"
9	Anna van der Breggen (NED)	Boels–Dolmans	+ 0"
10	Erica Magnaldi (ITA)	WNT–Rotor Pro Cycling	+ 0"

General classification after Stage 3
Rank	Rider	Team	Time
1	Katarzyna Niewiadoma (POL)	Canyon//SRAM	5h 36' 48"
2	Cecilie Uttrup Ludwig (DEN)	Bigla Pro Cycling	+ 20"
3	Marianne Vos (NED)	CCC - Liv	+ 25"
4	Alena Amialiusik (BLR)	Canyon//SRAM	+ 40"
5	Omer Shapira (ISR)	Canyon//SRAM	+ 44"
6	Ashleigh Moolman (RSA)	CCC - Liv	+ 45"
7	Annemiek van Vleuten (NED)	Mitchelton–Scott	+ 47"
8	Amanda Spratt (AUS)	Mitchelton–Scott	+ 52"
9	Lucy Kennedy (AUS)	Mitchelton–Scott	+ 59"
10	Anna van der Breggen (NED)	Boels–Dolmans	+ 1' 04"

=== Stage 4 ===
8 July 2019 — Lissone to Carate Brianza, 100.1 km (62.2 mi)

A three rider strong breakaway, consisting of Letizia Borghesi, Chiara Perini and Anouska Koster rode away from the peloton after 38 km (23.6 mi). Koster was dropped, while Nadia Quagliotto attacked from the peloton to join the two other Italians at the front. Quagliotto unsuccessfully tried to drop her fellow breakaway companions on the only categorised climb of the day. With the race coming down to a sprint for the three riders in the breakaway, Quagliotto was the first to launch her sprint. Thinking she'd won, she started celebrating, only to be pipped on the line by Borghesi.

Stage 4 result
Rank	Rider	Team	Time
1	Letizia Borghesi (ITA)	Aromitalia–Basso Bikes–Vaiano	2h 29' 50"
2	Nadia Quagliotto (ITA)	Alé–Cipollini	+ 0"
3	Chiara Perini (ITA)	Bepink	+ 0"
4	Marianne Vos (NED)	CCC - Liv	+ 42"
5	Leah Kirchmann (CAN)	Team Sunweb	+ 42"
6	Soraya Paladin (ITA)	Alé–Cipollini	+ 42"
7	Annemiek van Vleuten (NED)	Mitchelton–Scott	+ 42"
8	Ilaria Sanguineti (ITA)	Valcar–Cylance	+ 42"
9	Kelly Van den Steen (BEL)	Lotto–Soudal Ladies	+ 42"
10	Rasa Leleivytė (LIT)	Aromitalia–Basso Bikes–Vaiano	+ 42"

General classification after Stage 4
Rank	Rider	Team	Time
1	Katarzyna Niewiadoma (POL)	Canyon//SRAM	8h 07' 20"
2	Cecilie Uttrup Ludwig (DEN)	Bigla Pro Cycling	+ 20"
3	Marianne Vos (NED)	CCC - Liv	+ 25"
4	Alena Amialiusik (BLR)	Canyon//SRAM	+ 40"
5	Omer Shapira (ISR)	Canyon//SRAM	+ 44"
6	Ashleigh Moolman (RSA)	CCC - Liv	+ 45"
7	Annemiek van Vleuten (NED)	Mitchelton–Scott	+ 47"
8	Amanda Spratt (AUS)	Mitchelton–Scott	+ 52"
9	Lucy Kennedy (AUS)	Mitchelton–Scott	+ 59"
10	Anna van der Breggen (NED)	Boels–Dolmans	+ 1' 04"

=== Stage 5 ===
9 July 2019 — Ponte in Valtellina to ~~Valfurva (Passo Gavia)~~ Lago di Cancano, ~~100 km (62.1 mi)~~ 87.5 km (54.4 mi)

Originally, stage 5 was planned to finish on the Passo di Gavia. However, due to landslides, the stage had to be rerouted. The organisers replaced the Gavia with the finish to Lago Cancano in Valdidentro, a finish previously used in the 2011 edition.

Stage 5 result
Rank	Rider	Team	Time
1	Annemiek van Vleuten (NED)	Mitchelton–Scott	3h 09' 47"
2	Lucinda Brand (NED)	Team Sunweb	+ 2' 57"
3	Katarzyna Niewiadoma (POL)	Canyon//SRAM	+ 2' 57"
4	Soraya Paladin (ITA)	Alé–Cipollini	+ 2' 57"
5	Amanda Spratt (AUS)	Mitchelton–Scott	+ 2' 57"
6	Anna van der Breggen (NED)	Boels–Dolmans	+ 2' 57"
7	Ashleigh Moolman (RSA)	CCC - Liv	+ 2' 57"
8	Erica Magnaldi (ITA)	WNT–Rotor Pro Cycling	+ 2' 57"
9	Elisa Longo Borghini (ITA)	Trek–Segafredo	+ 2' 57"
10	Demi Vollering (NED)	Parkhotel Valkenburg	+ 3' 25"

General classification after Stage 5
Rank	Rider	Team	Time
1	Annemiek van Vleuten (NED)	Mitchelton–Scott	11h 17' 44"
2	Katarzyna Niewiadoma (POL)	Canyon//SRAM	+ 2' 16"
3	Ashleigh Moolman (RSA)	CCC - Liv	+ 3' 05"
4	Amanda Spratt (AUS)	Mitchelton–Scott	+ 3' 12"
5	Anna van der Breggen (NED)	Boels–Dolmans	+ 3' 24"
6	Lucinda Brand (NED)	Team Sunweb	+ 3' 27"
7	Elisa Longo Borghini (ITA)	Trek–Segafredo	+ 3' 59"
8	Katie Hall (USA)	Boels–Dolmans	+ 4' 04"
9	Erica Magnaldi (ITA)	WNT–Rotor Pro Cycling	+ 4' 10"
10	Juliette Labous (FRA)	Team Sunweb	+ 4' 26"

=== Stage 6 ===
10 July 2019 — Chiuro to Teglio, 12.1 km (7.5 mi)

Stage 6 result
Rank	Rider	Team	Time
1	Annemiek van Vleuten (NED)	Mitchelton–Scott	24' 31"
2	Anna van der Breggen (NED)	Boels–Dolmans	+ 53"
3	Elisa Longo Borghini (ITA)	Trek–Segafredo	+ 1' 48"
4	Lucinda Brand (NED)	Team Sunweb	+ 1' 50"
5	Juliette Labous (FRA)	Team Sunweb	+ 1' 54"
6	Katarzyna Niewiadoma (POL)	Canyon//SRAM	+ 2' 01"
7	Katie Hall (USA)	Boels–Dolmans	+ 2' 04"
8	Amanda Spratt (AUS)	Mitchelton–Scott	+ 2' 09"
9	Tayler Wiles (USA)	Trek–Segafredo	+ 2' 22"
10	Erica Magnaldi (ITA)	WNT–Rotor Pro Cycling	+ 2' 24"

General classification after Stage 6
Rank	Rider	Team	Time
1	Annemiek van Vleuten (NED)	Mitchelton–Scott	11h 42' 15"
2	Anna van der Breggen (NED)	Boels–Dolmans	+ 4' 17"
3	Katarzyna Niewiadoma (POL)	Canyon//SRAM	+ 4' 17"
4	Lucinda Brand (NED)	Team Sunweb	+ 5' 17"
5	Amanda Spratt (AUS)	Mitchelton–Scott	+ 5' 21"
6	Elisa Longo Borghini (ITA)	Trek–Segafredo	+ 5' 47"
7	Katie Hall (USA)	Boels–Dolmans	+ 6' 08"
8	Juliette Labous (FRA)	Team Sunweb	+ 6' 20"
9	Ashleigh Moolman (RSA)	CCC - Liv	+ 6' 33"
10	Erica Magnaldi (ITA)	WNT–Rotor Pro Cycling	+ 6' 34"

=== Stage 7 ===
11 July 2019 — Cornedo Vicentino to San Giorgio di Perlena/Fara Vicentino, 128.3 km (79.7 mi)

Stage 7 result
Rank	Rider	Team	Time
1	Marianne Vos (NED)	CCC - Liv	3h 19' 33"
2	Anna van der Breggen (NED)	Boels–Dolmans	+ 0"
3	Elisa Longo Borghini (ITA)	Trek–Segafredo	+ 3"
4	Annemiek van Vleuten (NED)	Mitchelton–Scott	+ 3"
5	Demi Vollering (NED)	Parkhotel Valkenburg	+ 9"
6	Soraya Paladin (ITA)	Alé–Cipollini	+ 9"
7	Katarzyna Niewiadoma (POL)	Canyon//SRAM	+ 9"
8	Ashleigh Moolman (RSA)	CCC - Liv	+ 9"
9	Ane Santesteban (ESP)	WNT–Rotor Pro Cycling	+ 9"
10	Amanda Spratt (AUS)	Mitchelton–Scott	+ 12"

General classification after Stage 7
Rank	Rider	Team	Time
1	Annemiek van Vleuten (NED)	Mitchelton–Scott	15h 01' 54"
2	Anna van der Breggen (NED)	Boels–Dolmans	+ 4' 08"
3	Katarzyna Niewiadoma (POL)	Canyon//SRAM	+ 4' 23"
4	Lucinda Brand (NED)	Team Sunweb	+ 5' 26"
5	Amanda Spratt (AUS)	Mitchelton–Scott	+ 5' 30"
6	Elisa Longo Borghini (ITA)	Trek–Segafredo	+ 5' 43"
7	Katie Hall (USA)	Boels–Dolmans	+ 6' 20"
8	Ashleigh Moolman (RSA)	CCC - Liv	+ 6' 39"
9	Juliette Labous (FRA)	Team Sunweb	+ 6' 39"
10	Erica Magnaldi (ITA)	WNT–Rotor Pro Cycling	+ 6' 46"

=== Stage 8 ===
12 July 2019 — Vittorio Veneto to Maniago, 133.3 km (82.8 mi)

Stage 8 result
Rank	Rider	Team	Time
1	Lizzy Banks (GBR)	Bigla Pro Cycling	3h 38' 17"
2	Leah Thomas (USA)	Bigla Pro Cycling	+ 30"
3	Soraya Paladin (ITA)	Alé–Cipollini	+ 30"
4	Małgorzata Jasińska (POL)	Movistar Team	+ 30"
5	Sofie De Vuyst (BEL)	Parkhotel Valkenburg	+ 30"
6	Kathrin Hammes (GER)	WNT–Rotor Pro Cycling	+ 30"
7	Pauliena Rooijakkers (NED)	CCC - Liv	+ 30"
8	Shara Gillow (AUS)	FDJ Nouvelle-Aquitaine Futuroscope	+ 30"
9	Ruth Winder (USA)	Trek–Segafredo	+ 30"
10	Alice Maria Arzuffi (ITA)	Valcar–Cylance	+ 30"

General classification after Stage 8
Rank	Rider	Team	Time
1	Annemiek van Vleuten (NED)	Mitchelton–Scott	18h 43' 01"
2	Anna van der Breggen (NED)	Boels–Dolmans	+ 4' 11"
3	Katarzyna Niewiadoma (POL)	Canyon//SRAM	+ 4' 26"
4	Lucinda Brand (NED)	Team Sunweb	+ 5' 26"
5	Amanda Spratt (AUS)	Mitchelton–Scott	+ 5' 33"
6	Elisa Longo Borghini (ITA)	Trek–Segafredo	+ 5' 46"
7	Soraya Paladin (ITA)	Alé–Cipollini	+ 6' 06"
8	Katie Hall (USA)	Boels–Dolmans	+ 6' 23"
9	Ashleigh Moolman (RSA)	CCC - Liv	+ 6' 42"
10	Erica Magnaldi (ITA)	WNT–Rotor Pro Cycling	+ 6' 49"

=== Stage 9 ===
13 July 2019 — Gemona to Chiusaforte/Malga Montasio, 125.5 km (78.0 mi)

Stage 9 result
Rank	Rider	Team	Time
1	Anna van der Breggen (NED)	Boels–Dolmans	3h 26' 27"
2	Annemiek van Vleuten (NED)	Mitchelton–Scott	+ 17"
3	Ashleigh Moolman (RSA)	CCC - Liv	+ 1' 38"
4	Amanda Spratt (AUS)	Mitchelton–Scott	+ 1' 38"
5	Katie Hall (USA)	Boels–Dolmans	+ 1' 57"
6	Demi Vollering (NED)	Parkhotel Valkenburg	+ 2' 51"
7	Ane Santesteban (ESP)	WNT–Rotor Pro Cycling	+ 2' 51"
8	Erica Magnaldi (ITA)	WNT–Rotor Pro Cycling	+ 2' 53"
9	Elisa Longo Borghini (ITA)	Trek–Segafredo	+ 2' 55"
10	Juliette Labous (FRA)	Team Sunweb	+ 3' 10"

General classification after Stage 9
Rank	Rider	Team	Time
1	Annemiek van Vleuten (NED)	Mitchelton–Scott	22h 09' 39"
2	Anna van der Breggen (NED)	Boels–Dolmans	+ 3' 50"
3	Amanda Spratt (AUS)	Mitchelton–Scott	+ 7' 00"
4	Ashleigh Moolman (RSA)	CCC - Liv	+ 8' 05"
5	Katie Hall (USA)	Boels–Dolmans	+ 8' 09"
6	Katarzyna Niewiadoma (POL)	Canyon//SRAM	+ 8' 10"
7	Lucinda Brand (NED)	Team Sunweb	+ 8' 25"
8	Elisa Longo Borghini (ITA)	Trek–Segafredo	+ 8' 30"
9	Soraya Paladin (ITA)	Alé–Cipollini	+ 9' 26"
10	Erica Magnaldi (ITA)	WNT–Rotor Pro Cycling	+ 9' 31"

=== Stage 10 ===
14 July 2019 — San Vito al Tagliamento to Udine, 120 km (74.6 mi)

Stage 10 result
Rank	Rider	Team	Time
1	Marianne Vos (NED)	CCC - Liv	2h 51' 45"
2	Lucinda Brand (NED)	Team Sunweb	+ 1"
3	Lotte Kopecky (BEL)	Lotto–Soudal Ladies	+ 1"
4	Soraya Paladin (ITA)	Alé–Cipollini	+ 4"
5	Katarzyna Niewiadoma (POL)	Canyon//SRAM	+ 4"
6	Ashleigh Moolman (RSA)	CCC - Liv	+ 6"
7	Elisa Longo Borghini (ITA)	Trek–Segafredo	+ 7"
8	Demi Vollering (NED)	Parkhotel Valkenburg	+ 9"
9	Rasa Leleivytė (LIT)	Aromitalia–Basso Bikes–Vaiano	+ 9"
10	Arianna Fidanza (ITA)	Eurotarget–Bianchi–Vittoria	+ 10"

Final general classification
Rank	Rider	Team	Time
1	Annemiek van Vleuten (NED)	Mitchelton–Scott	25h 01' 41"
2	Anna van der Breggen (NED)	Boels–Dolmans	+ 3' 45"
3	Amanda Spratt (AUS)	Mitchelton–Scott	+ 6' 55"
4	Ashleigh Moolman (RSA)	CCC - Liv	+ 7' 54"
5	Katarzyna Niewiadoma (POL)	Canyon//SRAM	+ 7' 57"
6	Lucinda Brand (NED)	Team Sunweb	+ 8' 01"
7	Katie Hall (USA)	Boels–Dolmans	+ 8' 16"
8	Elisa Longo Borghini (ITA)	Trek–Segafredo	+ 8' 19"
9	Soraya Paladin (ITA)	Alé–Cipollini	+ 9' 13"
10	Erica Magnaldi (ITA)	WNT–Rotor Pro Cycling	+ 9' 31"

== Classification leadership table ==
In the 2019 Giro d'Italia Femminile, five different jerseys will be awarded. The most important is the general classification, which is calculated by adding each cyclist's finishing times on each stage. Time bonuses will be awarded to the first three finishers on all stages with the exception of the time trials: the stage winner will win a ten-second bonus, with six and four seconds for the second and third riders respectively. Bonus seconds will also be awarded to the first three riders at intermediate sprints; three seconds for the winner of the sprint, two seconds for the rider in second and one second for the rider in third. The rider with the least accumulated time is the race leader, identified by a pink jersey. This classification is considered the most important of the 2019 Giro d'Italia Femminile, and the winner of the classification was considered the winner of the race.

Additionally, there will a points classification, which awards a cyclamen jersey. In the points classification, cyclists receive points for finishing in the top 10 in a stage, and unlike in the points classification in the Tour de France, the winners of all stages – with the exception of the team time trial, which awards no points towards the classification – are awarded the same number of points. For winning a stage, a rider earned 15 points, with 12 for second, 10 for third, 8 for fourth, 6 for fifth with a point fewer per place down to a single point for 10th place.

Points for the mountains classification
Position	1	2	3	4	5
Points for Category 2	7	5	3	2	1
Points for Category 3	5	4	3	2	1

There is also a mountains classification, the leadership of which is marked by a green jersey. In the mountains classification, points towards the classification are won by reaching the top of a climb before other cyclists. Each climb is categorised as either second, or third-category, with more points available for the higher-categorised climbs; however on both categories, the top five riders were awarded points. The fourth jersey represents the young rider classification, marked by a white jersey. This is decided the same way as the general classification, but only riders born on or after 1 January 1996 are eligible to be ranked in the classification.

The fifth and final jersey represents the classification for Italian riders, marked by a blue jersey. This is decided the same way as the general classification, but only riders born in Italy are eligible to be ranked in the classification. There is also a team classification, in which the times of the best three cyclists per team on each stage are added together; the leading team at the end of the race is the team with the lowest total time. The daily team leaders wore red dossards in the following stage.

Stage	Winner	General classification	Points classification	Mountains classification	Young rider classification	Italian rider classification	Teams classification
1	Canyon–SRAM	Katarzyna Niewiadoma	not awarded	not awarded	Mikayla Harvey	Elisa Longo Borghini	Canyon–SRAM
2	Marianne Vos	Katarzyna Niewiadoma	Marianne Vos	Sofie De Vuyst	Juliette Labous	Elisa Longo Borghini	Canyon–SRAM
3	Marianne Vos	Katarzyna Niewiadoma	Marianne Vos	Marianne Vos	Juliette Labous	Elisa Longo Borghini	Mitchelton–Scott
4	Letizia Borghesi	Katarzyna Niewiadoma	Marianne Vos	Sofie De Vuyst	Juliette Labous	Elisa Longo Borghini	Mitchelton–Scott
5	Annemiek van Vleuten	Annemiek van Vleuten	Annemiek van Vleuten	Annemiek van Vleuten	Juliette Labous	Elisa Longo Borghini	WNT–Rotor Pro Cycling
6	Annemiek van Vleuten	Annemiek van Vleuten	Annemiek van Vleuten	Annemiek van Vleuten	Juliette Labous	Elisa Longo Borghini	WNT–Rotor Pro Cycling
7	Marianne Vos	Annemiek van Vleuten	Annemiek van Vleuten	Annemiek van Vleuten	Juliette Labous	Elisa Longo Borghini	WNT–Rotor Pro Cycling
8	Lizzy Banks	Annemiek van Vleuten	Annemiek van Vleuten	Annemiek van Vleuten	Juliette Labous	Elisa Longo Borghini	WNT–Rotor Pro Cycling
9	Anna van der Breggen	Annemiek van Vleuten	Annemiek van Vleuten	Annemiek van Vleuten	Juliette Labous	Elisa Longo Borghini	WNT–Rotor Pro Cycling
10	Marianne Vos	Annemiek van Vleuten	Annemiek van Vleuten	Annemiek van Vleuten	Juliette Labous	Elisa Longo Borghini	WNT–Rotor Pro Cycling
Final		Annemiek van Vleuten	Annemiek van Vleuten	Annemiek van Vleuten	Juliette Labous	Elisa Longo Borghini	WNT–Rotor Pro Cycling

== Final classification standings ==
=== General classification ===
Final general classification (1-10)
Rank	Rider	Team	Time
1	Annemiek van Vleuten (NED)	Mitchelton–Scott	25h 01' 41"
2	Anna van der Breggen (NED)	Boels–Dolmans	+ 3' 45"
3	Amanda Spratt (AUS)	Mitchelton–Scott	+ 6' 55"
4	Ashleigh Moolman (RSA)	CCC - Liv	+ 7' 54"
5	Katarzyna Niewiadoma (POL)	Canyon//SRAM	+ 7' 57"
6	Lucinda Brand (NED)	Team Sunweb	+ 8' 01"
7	Katie Hall (USA)	Boels–Dolmans	+ 8' 16"
8	Elisa Longo Borghini (ITA)	Trek–Segafredo	+ 8' 19"
9	Soraya Paladin (ITA)	Alé–Cipollini	+ 9' 13"
10	Erica Magnaldi (ITA)	WNT–Rotor Pro Cycling	+ 9' 31"

=== Points classification ===
Final points classification (1-10)
Rank	Rider	Team	Points
1	Annemiek van Vleuten (NED)	Mitchelton–Scott	74
2	Marianne Vos (NED)	CCC - Liv	68
3	Anna van der Breggen (NED)	Boels–Dolmans	54
4	Lucinda Brand (NED)	Team Sunweb	47
5	Soraya Paladin (ITA)	Alé–Cipollini	46
6	Elisa Longo Borghini (ITA)	Trek–Segafredo	30
7	Ashleigh Moolman (RSA)	CCC - Liv	28
8	Katarzyna Niewiadoma (POL)	Canyon//SRAM	28
9	Amanda Spratt (AUS)	Mitchelton–Scott	23
10	Demi Vollering (NED)	Parkhotel Valkenburg	16

=== Mountains classification ===
Final mountains classification (1-10)
Rank	Rider	Team	Points
1	Annemiek van Vleuten (NED)	Mitchelton–Scott	47
2	Amanda Spratt (AUS)	Mitchelton–Scott	29
3	Sofie De Vuyst (BEL)	Parkhotel Valkenburg	22
4	Ashleigh Moolman (RSA)	CCC - Liv	20
5	Anna van der Breggen (NED)	Boels–Dolmans	14
6	Katarzyna Niewiadoma (POL)	Canyon//SRAM	14
7	Soraya Paladin (ITA)	Alé–Cipollini	12
8	Lucinda Brand (NED)	Team Sunweb	12
9	Marianne Vos (NED)	CCC - Liv	10
10	Elisa Longo Borghini (ITA)	Trek–Segafredo	10

=== Young rider classification ===
Final young rider classification (1-10)
Rank	Rider	Team	Time
1	Juliette Labous (FRA)	FDJ Nouvelle-Aquitaine Futuroscope	25h 11' 32"
2	Paula Patiño (COL)	Movistar Team	+ 7' 50"
3	Évita Muzic (FRA)	FDJ Nouvelle-Aquitaine Futuroscope	+ 10' 36"
4	Katia Ragusa (ITA)	Bepink	+ 12' 40"
5	Mikayla Harvey (NZL)	Bigla Pro Cycling	+ 16' 19"
6	Nikola Nosková (CZE)	Bigla Pro Cycling	+ 20' 31"
7	Elena Pirrone (ITA)	Valcar–Cylance	+ 22' 59"
8	Nina Buysman (NED)	Parkhotel Valkenburg	+ 27' 13"
9	Marta Lach (POL)	CCC - Liv	+ 35' 42"
10	Nadia Quagliotto (ITA)	Alé–Cipollini	+ 41' 46"

=== Italian rider classification ===
Final Italian rider classification (1-10)
Rank	Rider	Team	Time
1	Elisa Longo Borghini (ITA)	Trek–Segafredo	25h 10' 00"
2	Soraya Paladin (ITA)	Alé–Cipollini	+ 54"
3	Erica Magnaldi (ITA)	WNT–Rotor Pro Cycling	+ 1' 12"
4	Elena Franchi (ITA)	Eurotarget–Bianchi–Vittoria	+ 7' 43"
5	Alice Maria Arzuffi (ITA)	Valcar–Cylance	+ 11' 08"
6	Katia Ragusa (ITA)	Bepink	+ 14' 12"
7	Tatiana Guderzo (ITA)	Bepink	+ 15' 12"
8	Elena Pirrone (ITA)	Valcar–Cylance	+ 24' 31"
9	Asja Paladin (ITA)	Valcar–Cylance	+ 31' 52"
10	Nadia Quagliotto (ITA)	Alé–Cipollini	+ 43' 18"

=== Teams classification ===
Final teams classification (1-10)
Rank	Team	Time
1	WNT–Rotor Pro Cycling	74h 31' 45"
2	Mitchelton–Scott	+ 21"
3	Canyon//SRAM	+ 12' 52"
4	Bigla Pro Cycling	+ 13' 12"
5	Team Sunweb	+ 14' 42"
6	Boels–Dolmans	+ 20' 12"
7	CCC - Liv	+ 23' 07"
8	Parkhotel Valkenburg	+ 23' 54"
9	Trek–Segafredo	+ 34' 27"
10	Movistar Team	+ 47' 12"

== See also ==
- 2019 in women's road cycling
