= Abigail Mickey =

American cyclist

Personal information
- Full name: Abigail Mickey
- Nicknames: Abi; Abby
- Born: July 3, 1990 (age 36) Aspen, Colorado, United States

Cycling career
- Sport: Cycling
- Current team: Retired
- Discipline: Road
- Role: Rider

Professional teams
- 2014: Twenty16
- 2015–2016: UnitedHealthcare
- 2017: Colavita/Bianchi
- 2018–2019: Rally Cycling

Abigail Mickey (born July 3, 1990) is an American former professional racing cyclist, who rode professionally between 2014 and 2019 for the Twenty16, UnitedHealthcare, Colavita/Bianchi and Rally UHC Cycling teams.

She is married to Latvian racing cyclist Toms Skujiņš.

After racing career she became a cycling journalist working for online publications Cycling Tips and Escape Collective.

== See also ==
- List of 2015 UCI Women's Teams and riders
