= Scotti Lechuga =

American bicycle racer

Personal information
- Full name: Elizabeth Lechuga
- Born: Elizabeth Wilborne; January 7, 1983 (age 43)

Cycling career
- Sport: Cycling
- Current team: Retired
- Discipline: Road
- Role: Rider

Amateur teams
- 2019: Fast Chance Women's Cycling–The Happy Tooth
- 2019: Donne Aevolo
- 2019: Fearless Femme Racing

Professional teams
- 2014: Team TIBCO–To The Top
- 2014–2015: UnitedHealthcare
- 2016–2017: Hagens Berman–Supermint
- 2018: Twenty20 p/b Sho-Air

Elizabeth "Scotti" Lechuga (née Wilborne; born January 7, 1983) is an American former professional racing cyclist, who rode professionally between 2014 and 2018 for the Team TIBCO–To The Top, UnitedHealthcare, Hagens Berman–Supermint and Twenty20 p/b Sho-Air teams. In 2018, Lechuga stepped away from racing and now runs Leborne Coaching, with husband Ernie Lechuga.

== Personal life ==
She is married to former pro racer Ernie Lechuga and they have two sons.

== Major results ==
2015
2nd Overall Joe Martin Stage Race

1st Stage 4

10th Overall Tour Femenino de San Luis
2016
5th Overall Joe Martin Stage Race
8th Overall Tour of the Gila
9th Winston-Salem Cycling Classic
2017
2nd White Spot / Delta Road Race
7th Overall Tour of the Gila

== See also ==
- List of 2015 UCI Women's Teams and riders
