= Diana Peñuela =

Colombian cyclist (born 1986)

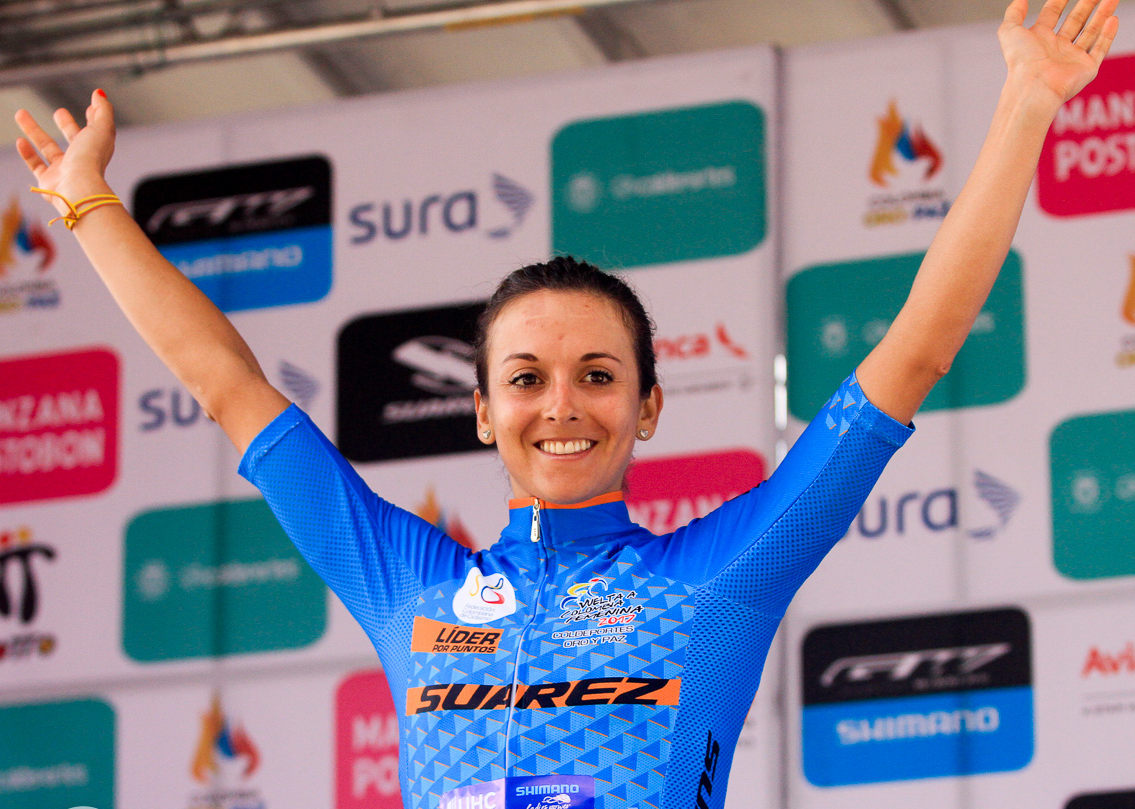
- Peñuela in 2017

Personal information
- Full name: Diana Carolina Peñuela Martínez
- Born: 8 September 1986 (age 40) Manizales, Colombia
- Height: 162 cm (5 ft 4 in)

Cycling career
- Sport: Cycling
- Current team: DNA Pro Cycling
- Discipline: Road
- Role: Rider
- Rider type: Sprinter

Amateur teams
- 2014: Specialized Colombia Indeportes
- 2015: Sun and Ski Women Elite Team

Professional teams
- 2016–2018: UnitedHealthcare
- 2019: Alé–Cipollini
- 2020–2021: Tibco–Silicon Valley Bank
- 2022–: DNA Pro Cycling
Medal record
Women's road cycling
Representing Colombia
Pan American Championships
| Bronze medal – third place | 2026 Montería | Road race |
Bolivarian Games
| Gold medal – first place | 2025 Lima-Ayacucho | Time trial |
| Bronze medal – third place | 2025 Lima-Ayacucho | Road race |

Diana Carolina Peñuela Martínez (born 8 September 1986) is a Colombian racing cyclist, who currently rides for UCI Women's Continental Team DNA Pro Cycling.

She is known as a sprinter with victories in Criterium Manizales Fair, the Rigorena Circuit, Grand Prix Armenia, Diablo Twilight Criterium, Milwaukee Mile Crit and bronze medals in the XVII Bolivarian Games in 2013 and the X South American Games in 2014. She competed in the 2013 UCI women's road race in Florence, and the 2015 UCI Road World Championships in Richmond.

== Major results ==
2011
1st Criterium Manizales Fair
7th Classic Anapoima
2012
4th Copa Federacion Venezolana de Ciclismo
10th Grand Prix GSB
2013
1st Classic Bogota City
2nd Criterium Manizales Fair
3rd Road race, Bolivarian Games
4th Road race, National Road Championships
5th Tour Feminino Colombia
2014
1st Tour of Galena Illinois
1st Criterium Manizales Fair
2nd Road race, National Road Championships
3rd Road race, South American Games
5th Tour of America's Dairyland
6th Glencoe Grand Prix
8th Road race, Pan American Road Championships
10th Grand Prix GSB
2015
1st Criterium, Texas State Road Championships
Hotter'N Hell Hundred

1st Road race
1st Criterium

1st Sun and Ski Summer Criterium
2nd Road race, National Road Championships
2nd Chappell Hill Bank Classic
9th St Francis Tulsa Tough Criterium
10th Tour of Utah Women's Edition Omnium
2016
4th Gran Prix San Luis Femenino
2017
1st Clasica Rionegro
2nd Road race, Bolivarian Games
4th Road race, National Road Championships
5th Overall Vuelta a Colombia Femenina

1st Points classification
1st Stage 1

10th Overall Joe Martin Stage Race
2018
1st Clásica a Zarzal
1st Stage 2 Vuelta al Valle del Cauca
3rd Winston-Salem Cycling Classic
4th Road race, Central American and Caribbean Games
4th Overall Joe Martin Stage Race

1st Stage 1

5th Road race, South American Games
5th Overall Tour of the Gila

1st Stage 5

2019
5th Clasica Femenina Navarra
2020
2nd Time trial, National Road Championships
2021
3rd Road race, National Road Championships
2022
1st Road race, National Road Championships
9th Overall Tour of the Gila
2023
1st Road race, National Road Championships
2024
1st Time trial, National Road Championships

2026
Pan American Road Championships

3rd Road race

CAC Games

4th Time trial
5th Road race

South American Games

4th Time trial
