= Gran Prix San Luis Femenino =

Argentine one-day road cycling race

Race details
- Date: January
- Region: Argentina
- Discipline: Road
- Type: Stage race

History
- First edition: 2013
- Editions: 4 (as of 2015) 2 as a UCI ranked event
- First winner: Hannah Barnes (GBR) (at UCI level)
- Most wins: No repeat winners
- Most recent: Małgorzata Jasińska (POL)

Gran Prix San Luis Femenino is a women's staged cycle race which takes place in Argentina.

== Overall winners ==
Year	Winner	Second	Third
National event
2013	Unknown	Unknown	Unknown
2014	Unknown	Unknown	Unknown
UCI 1.2 ranked event
2015	(United Kingdom) Hannah Barnes	(Brazil) Luciene Ferreira	(Brazil) Clemilda Fernandes
2016	(Poland) Małgorzata Jasińska	(United States) Coryn Rivera	(Italy) Anna Trevisi
