= Villa de la Quebrada =

Coordinates: 33°02′S 66°18′W

- Municipality and village
- Interactive map of Villa de la Quebrada
- Country: Argentina
- Province: San Luis Province
- Time zone: UTC−3 (ART)

Villa de la Quebrada is a village and municipality in San Luis Province in central Argentina.
