= 2019 Tour of California (women's race) =

2019 Amgen Tour of California Women's Race
2019 UCI Women's World Tour, race 11 of 23

Race details
- Dates: 16–18 May 2019
- Stages: 3

Results
Jersey awarded to the overall winner	Winner	Anna van der Breggen (NED)	(Boels–Dolmans)
	Second	Katharine Hall (USA)	(Boels–Dolmans)
	Third	Ashleigh Moolman Pasio (RSA)	(CCC - Liv)
Jersey awarded to the mountains classification winner	Mountains	Liliana Moreno Canchon (COL)	(Astana)
Jersey awarded to the young rider classification winner	Young rider	Juliette Labous (FRA)	(Team Sunweb)
Jersey awarded to the sprints classification winner	Sprints	Anna van der Breggen (NED)	(Boels–Dolmans)
	Team	Canyon//SRAM	

The fifth running of the Women's Tour of California (officially: Amgen Tour of California Women's Race empowered with SRAM) was held from 16 to 18 May 2019.

It was the 11th race of the 2019 UCI Women's World Tour. Raced over three stages, it covered a total distance of 177 miles.

== Teams ==
16 teams started:

Professional women's teams

- Canyon//SRAM
- Bepink
- Astana
- Boels–Dolmans
- CCC - Liv
- Cogeas–Mettler–Look
- Drops
- Hagens Berman–Supermint
- Rally UHC Cycling
- Sho-Air Twenty20
- Swapit–Agolíco
- Team Sunweb
- Tibco–Silicon Valley Bank
- Trek–Segafredo
- Valcar–Cylance
- WNT–Rotor Pro Cycling

== Schedule ==
List of stages
Stage	Date	Course	Distance	Type	Winner
1	16 May	Ventura to Ventura	96.5 km (60.0 mi)	Flat stage	Anna van der Breggen (NED)
2	17 May	Ontario to Mt. Baldy	74 km (46.0 mi)	Mountain stage	Katharine Hall (USA)
3	18 May	Santa Clarita to Pasadena	115.5 km (71.8 mi)	Hilly stage	Elisa Balsamo (ITA)
Total			301.5 km (187.3 mi)		

== Classification leadership table ==
In the Tour of California, five different jerseys are awarded. For the general classification, calculated by adding each cyclist's finishing times on each stage, and allowing time bonuses for the first three finishers at intermediate sprints and at the finish of mass-start stages, the leader received a yellow jersey. This classification was considered the most important of the 2019 Tour of California, and the winner of the classification was considered the winner of the race.

Additionally, there was a sprints classification, which awarded a green jersey. In the sprints classification, cyclists received points for finishing in the top 10 in a stage. For winning a stage, a rider earned 15 points, with 12 for second, 9 for third, 7 for fourth with a point fewer per place down to a single point for 10th place. Points towards the classification could also be accrued – awarded on a 3–2–1 scale – at intermediate sprint points during each stage; these intermediate sprints also offered bonus seconds towards the general classification. There was also a mountains classification, the leadership of which was marked by a white jersey with red polka dots. In the mountains classification, points were won by reaching the top of a climb before other cyclists, with more points available for the higher-categorised climbs.

The fourth jersey represented the young rider classification, marked by a predominantly "white design" jersey. This was decided in the same way as the general classification, but only riders born after 1 January 1993 were eligible to be ranked in the classification. There was also a classification for teams, in which the times of the best three cyclists per team on each stage were added together; the leading team at the end of the race was the team with the lowest total time. In addition, there was a combativity award given after each stage to the rider considered, by a jury, to have "who best exemplifies the character of those engaged in the fight against cancer / heart disease", in line with the jersey's sponsors. This award was marked by a blue jersey.

Stage	Winner	General classification	Sprints classification	Mountains classification	Young rider classification	Most courageous rider	Team classification
1	Anna van der Breggen	Anna van der Breggen	Anna van der Breggen	Liliana Moreno Canchon	Elisa Balsamo	Lindsay Goldman	WNT–Rotor Pro Cycling
2	Katharine Hall	Anna van der Breggen	Anna van der Breggen	Katharine Hall	Juliette Labous	Omer Shapira	Canyon//SRAM
3	Elisa Balsamo	Anna van der Breggen	Anna van der Breggen	Liliana Moreno Canchon	Juliette Labous	Kathrin Hammes	Canyon//SRAM
Final		Anna van der Breggen	Anna van der Breggen	Liliana Moreno Canchon	Juliette Labous	not awarded	Canyon//SRAM
