= Hannah Barnes =

British cyclist (born 1993)

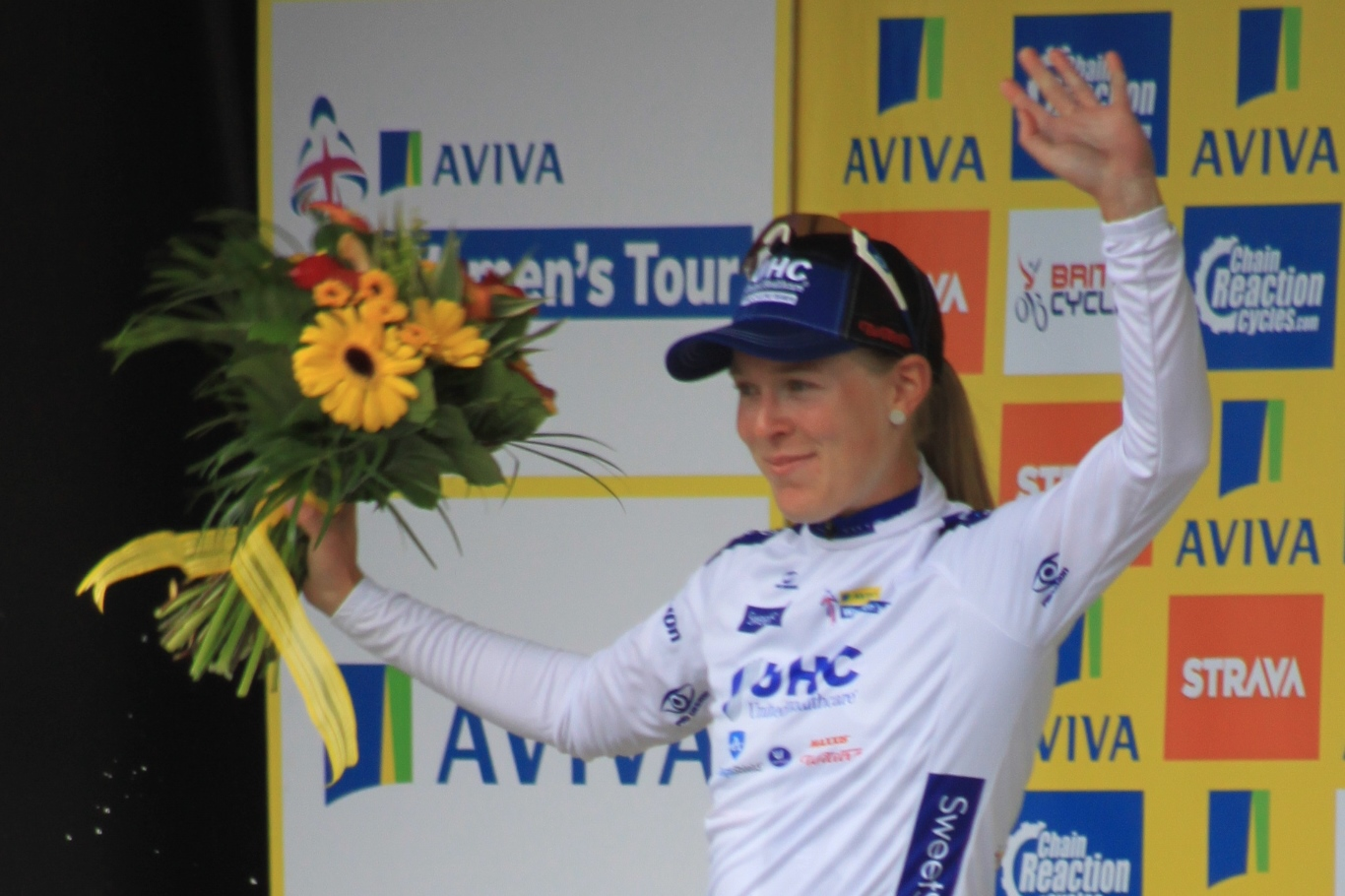
- Barnes at the 2015 The Women's Tour

Personal information
- Full name: Hannah Mary Barnes
- Born: 4 May 1993 (age 33) Tunbridge Wells, Kent, England, United Kingdom

Cycling career
- Sport: Cycling
- Current team: Uno-X Mobility
- Disciplines: Road; Track
- Role: Rider

Amateur teams
- 2003–2006: Team Keyne
- 2007: Palmer Park Velo

Professional teams
- 2008–2011: Pinarello Racing Team
- 2012: Team Ibis Cycles
- 2013: MG Maxifuel
- 2014–2015: UnitedHealthcare
- 2016–2021: Canyon//SRAM
- 2022–2023: Uno-X Pro Cycling Team

Major wins
- Major Tours Giro d'Italia 1 individual stage (2017) One-day races and Classics National Road Race Championships (2016) National Time Trial Championships (2018)
Medal record
Women's road cycling
Representing Canyon//SRAM
World Championships
Gold medal – first place	2018 Innsbruck	Team time trial
Silver medal – second place	2016 Doha	Team time trial

Hannah Mary Barnes (born 4 May 1993) is a British former racing cyclist, who last raced in 2023 for UCI Women's WorldTeam Uno-X Mobility. She is the sister of fellow former racing cyclist Alice Barnes.

== Career ==
Born in Tunbridge Wells, Kent, Barnes grew up in Bladon, Oxfordshire and later moved to Towcester, Northamptonshire. Barnes began cycling with Milton Keynes based Team Keyne at the age of 10, before joining Palmer Park Velo in Reading after she was spotted and invited to join British Cycling's Talent Team. Barnes was the under 14 omnium National Champion, a title held the previous year by Laura Trott, and the following year by Lucy Garner. A handful of national titles followed as an under 16 rider on the track, and again as a junior, when she also added the junior British National Time Trial Championships to her palmarès. As a junior rider, she also won the senior women's British National Circuit Race Championships in 2010 and 2011.

Barnes represented England at the 2011 Commonwealth Youth Games, held on the Isle of Man. In 2012, she rode for the UCI Women's Team Team Ibis Cycles.

On 8 June 2013, Barnes won the Elite Women's Criterium at the 7th edition of the IG London Nocturne. Originally she had been demoted to second place, behind Laura Trott, for her victory celebration which was deemed to be dangerous riding, but this decision was later reversed.

In November 2013 it was announced that Barnes would be racing for the new UnitedHealthcare women's cycling team in 2014. In November 2015 she was announced as part of the Canyon//SRAM team's inaugural squad for the 2016 season.

In June 2018, Barnes became the British National Time Trial Champion for the first time, beating her sister Alice into second place.

In August 2021 it was announced that Barnes would be leaving Canyon//SRAM for the new Uno-X Pro Cycling Team, due to commence competing from 2022.

== Personal life ==
Barnes is in a relationship with fellow professional cyclist, Sam Bewley.

== Major results ==
2008
1st Blackpool Grand Prix Des Dames
2009
1st London Nocturne
1st Leicestershire cyclo-cross
2nd Madison, National Track Championships (with Corrine Hall)
2010
1st National Criterium Championships
1st Madison, National Track Championships (with Hannah Walker)
National Junior Track Championships

1st Scratch
2nd Individual pursuit
3rd Sprint

1st Junior race, National Cyclo-cross Championships
1st London Nocturne
1st Twickenham CC Ladies Race
1st Dumfries BikeFest Women's Criterium
1st Stratford-upon-Avon Team Series
1st Oakley Team Series
1st City of Preston Circuit Races
2011
1st National Criterium Championships
National Junior Track Championships

1st Scratch
1st Points race

Commonwealth Youth Games

1st Criterium
1st Time trial
1st Team road race (with Lucy Garner & Harriet Owen)
3rd Road race

1st London Nocturne
1st CDNW Women's Road Race
1st Jersey Road Race
1st Peterborough Johnsons Healthtech Tour Series
1st City of Preston Circuit Races
National Track Championships

2nd Team pursuit (with Lucy Garner & Harriet Owen)
2nd Madison (with Hannah Walker)
3rd Individual pursuit

2012
1st London Nocturne
1st Stage 3 Essex Giro
3rd Madison, National Track Championships (with Eileen Roe)
2013
1st National Criterium Championships
Rás na mBan

1st Points classification
1st Queen of the Mountains classification
1st Stages 1,4 & 5

1st London Nocturne
1st Overall Johnsons Healthtech Tour Series

1st Sprint classification
1st Woking
1st Redditch
1st Colchester

1st Eagle RC Good Friday Circuit Race
1st Curlew Cup Road Race, British National Series
1st Oakley Team Series
1st Ryedale GP
2nd Overall City of Perth Grand Prix

1st Stage 3

2014
1st Blue Dome Criterium
1st Brady Arts District Criterium
1st Charlotte Criterium
1st Gateway Cup
1st Stage 1 Tour Femenino de San Luis
8th Overall The Women's Tour
9th Winston-Salem Cycling Classic
2015
1st Gran Prix San Luis Femenino
1st Sunny King Criterium
1st Charlotte Criterium
1st Novant Health Invitational Criterium
Tour Femenino de San Luis

1st Young rider classification
1st Stages 1 & 2

1st Young rider classification Tour of California
1st Stage 4 Tour of the Gila
5th Overall The Women's Tour

1st British rider classification
1st Young rider classification
1st Stage 5

2016
National Road Championships

1st Road race
5th Time trial

2nd Team time trial, UCI Road World Championships
6th Crescent Vårgårda
9th Prudential RideLondon Grand Prix
2017
1st Stage 3 Giro d'Italia Femminile
National Road Championships

2nd Time trial
3rd Road race

3rd Overall The Women's Tour

1st British rider classification

3rd Crescent Vårgårda TTT
5th Women's Tour de Yorkshire
7th Le Samyn
9th UCI Road World Championships – Women's time trial
2018
1st Team time trial, UCI Road World Championships
1st Time trial, National Road Championships
1st Overall Setmana Ciclista Valenciana

1st Stages 1 & 4

2nd Tour of Guangxi
6th Gent–Wevelgem
2019
1st Stage 1 (TTT) Giro Rosa
2nd Postnord UCI WWT Vårgårda West Sweden TTT
3rd Time trial, National Road Championships
8th Overall Women's Tour de Yorkshire
2020
6th Liège–Bastogne–Liège
9th La Périgord Ladies
2021
5th Omloop Het Nieuwsblad
5th Time trial, National Road Championships
9th Clasica Femenina Navarra
