= Luciene Ferreira da Silva =

Brazilian cyclist

Personal information
- Full name: Luciene Ferreira da Silva
- Born: 12 February 1985 (age 41) Coxim, Mato Grosso do Sul

Cycling career
- Sport: Cycling
- Disciplines: Road; Track
- Role: Rider

Amateur teams
- 2013–2015: Funvic/Marcondes César/BrasilInvest/Caloi/Gelog
- 2017–2018: Funvic

Professional team
- 2016: Weber Shimano Ladies Power

Luciene Ferreira da Silva (born 12 February 1985) is a Brazilian road and track cyclist. She participated at the 2011 UCI Road World Championships, and is a four-time national champion; winning the Brazilian National Time Trial Championships in 2011 and 2012, and the Brazilian National Road Race Championships in 2012 and 2013.

== Major results ==
2005
1st Prova Ciclística 9 de Julho
National Road Championships

2nd Road race
2nd Time trial

2006
2nd Time trial, National Road Championships
2007
1st Prova Ciclística 9 de Julho
3rd Road race, National Road Championships
5th Copa América de Ciclismo
2008
2nd Road race, National Road Championships
2011
National Road Championships

1st Time trial
3rd Road race

2012
National Road Championships

1st Road race
1st Time trial

2013
1st Road race, National Road Championships
5th Time trial, Pan American Road Championships
2014
6th Overall Tour Femenino de San Luis
2015
2nd Road race, National Road Championships
2nd Gran Prix San Luis Femenino
2021
3rd Team pursuit, National Track Championships
