= Alison Powers =

American racing cyclist

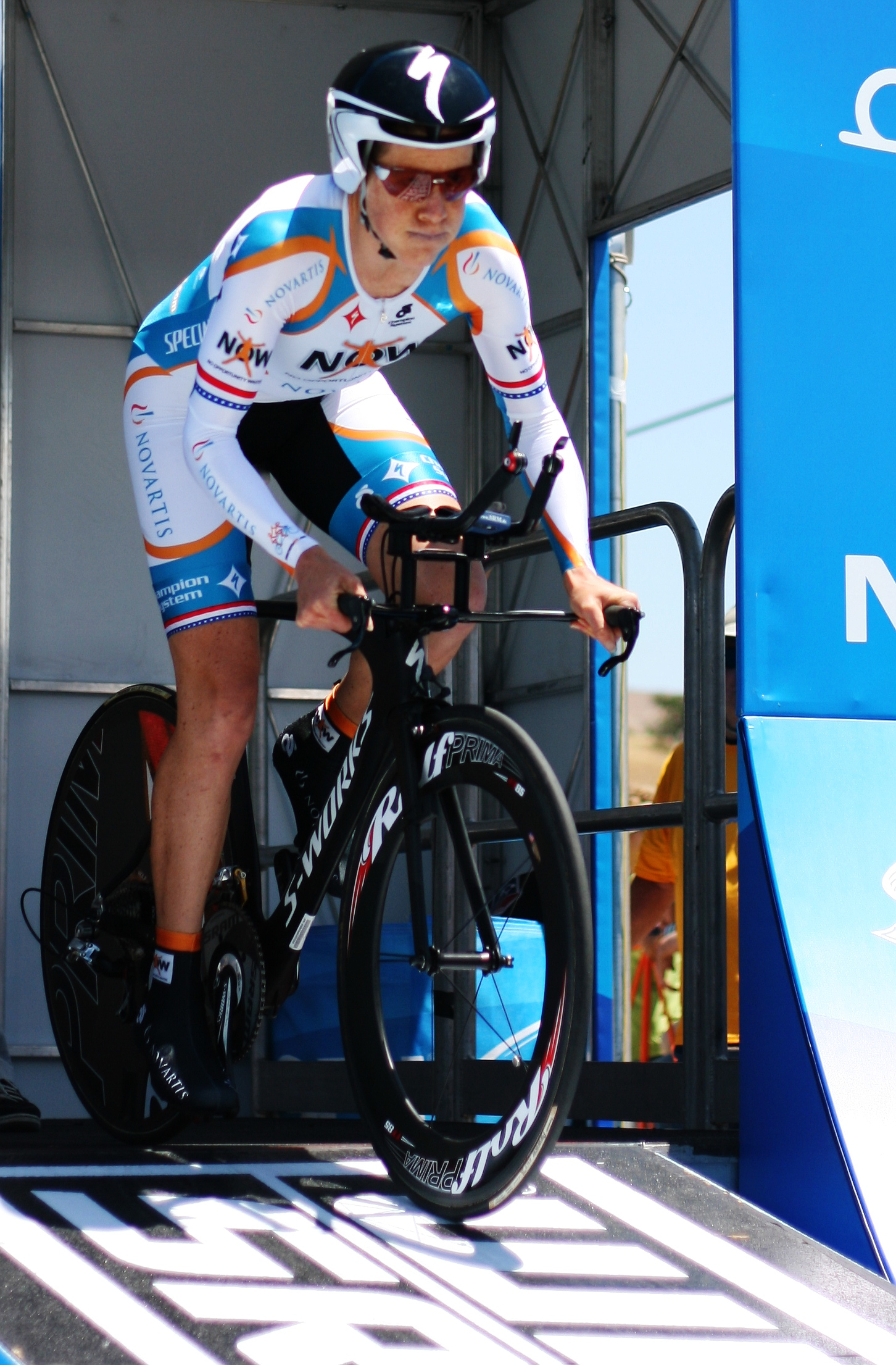

Personal information
- Born: December 14, 1979 (age 46)

Cycling career
- Sport: Cycling
- Current team: Retired
- Discipline: Road
- Role: Rider
- Rider type: All rounder

Amateur team
- 2010: Team Vera Bradley Foundation

Professional teams
- 2006: Rio Grande/Sports Garage
- 2007: Colavita/Sutter Home Presented by Cooking Light
- 2011: Team TIBCO
- 2013: NOW and Novartis for MS
- 2014: UnitedHealthcare Women’s Team
Medal record
Women's road bicycle racing
Representing United States
Pan American Championships
Gold medal – first place	2007 Valencia	Time trial

Alison Powers is an American former racing cyclist who last rode for the UnitedHealthcare Women’s Team.

Powers is the first American rider to simultaneously be National Champion in all three disciplines of road cycling (Criterium, Road and Time trial).

On October 23, 2014, Powers announced her retirement from the sport.

== Major results ==
2006
1st Stage 4 Tour of the Gila
1st Prologue & Stage 5 Mount Hood Classic
1st Stage 1 Tour de Toona
2007
1st National Time Trial Championships
1st Pan American Time Trial Championships
1st Sequoia Cycling Classic
1st Stage 2 Tour de Toona
2nd National Track Championships (individual pursuit)
2nd National Track Championships (points race)
3rd Memorial Davide Fardelli Chrono
2009
1st Overall Joe Martin Stage Race

1st Stages 1 & 4

1st Boulder Criterium
2nd Overall Tour of the Gila
6th Liberty Classic
3rd Overall Redlands Bicycle Classic

1st Stage 3

3rd Overall Nature Valley Grand Prix
3rd National Time Trial Championships
2010
1st Overall Joe Martin Stage Race
1st Prologue Cascade Cycling Classic
2012
3rd National Time Trial Championships
3rd Las Vegas Cyclo-cross
2013
1st National Criterium Championships
3rd National Road Race Championships
3rd National Time Trial Championships
2014
1st National Time Trial Championships
1st National Road Race Championships
1st Overall Tour Femenino de San Luis

1st Combination classification
1st Stage 3

1st Stage 4 Tour of the Gila
1st Women's Tour of California Time Trial
8th UCI Road World Championships – Women's time trial
