= UnitedHealthcare Pro Cycling (women's team) =

American cycling team

UnitedHealthcare Pro Cycling Women's Team

Team information
- UCI code: UHC
- Registered: United States
- Founded: 2014
- Disbanded: 2018
- Discipline: Road
- Status: UCI Women's Team
- Bicycles: Orbea
- Website: Team home page

Key personnel
- Team manager: Rachel Heal

Team name history
- 2014–2018: UnitedHealthcare Pro Cycling Women's Team

The UnitedHealthcare Pro Cycling Women's Team was a professional women's road bicycle racing team, managed by Momentum Sports Group and based in the United States. The team was principally sponsored by UnitedHealth Group. Its most notable signing was the 2013 Giro Rosa overall winner, Mara Abbott. The team made its debut at the inaugural Tour Femenino de San Luis.

The team disbanded at the end of the 2018 season.

== Team history ==
=== 2014 ===
==== Riders in ====
On September 9, 2014, it was reported that Linda Villumsen would join the team for the 2015 season. On October 27, the team signed Laura Brown and Abigail Mickey. Ruth Winder, Scotti Wilborne, Lauren Tamayo, Alexis Ryan, Coryn Rivera, Cari Higgins, Katie Hall, Rushlee Buchanan, and Hannah Barnes signed contract extensions.

==== Riders out ====
On October 23, 2014, Alison Powers announced her retirement from cycling.

== Team roster ==
Rider	Date of birth
Elizabeth Banks (UK)	November 7, 1990 (age 35)
Rushlee Buchanan (NZL)	January 20, 1988 (age 38)
Janelle Cole (USA)	October 19, 1996 (age 29)
Katie Hall (USA)	January 6, 1987 (age 39)

Rider	Date of birth
Lauren Hall (USA)	February 2, 1979 (age 47)
Lauretta Hanson (AUS)	October 29, 1994 (age 31)
Diana Peñuela (COL)	September 8, 1986 (age 39)
Leah Thomas (USA)	May 30, 1989 (age 37)

== Previous squads ==
=== 2016 ===
As of 1 January 2016. Ages as of 1 January 2016.

Rider	Date of birth
Laura Brown (CAN)	27 November 1986 (aged 29)
Rushlee Buchanan (NZL)	20 January 1988 (aged 27)
Annie Ewart (CAN)	29 September 1993 (aged 22)
Katharine Hall (USA)	6 January 1987 (aged 28)
Cari Higgins (USA)	5 October 1976 (aged 39)
Abigail Mickey (USA)	3 July 1990 (aged 25)

Rider	Date of birth
Diana Peñuela (COL)	8 September 1986 (aged 29)
Laurel Rathbun (USA)	10 May 1996 (aged 19)
Coryn Rivera (USA)	26 August 1992 (aged 23)
Iris Slappendel (NED)	18 February 1985 (aged 30)
Lauren Tamayo (USA)	25 October 1983 (aged 32)
Linda Villumsen (NZL)	9 April 1985 (aged 30)

=== 2015 ===
As of March 10, 2015. Ages are as of January 1, 2015.

Rider	Date of birth
Hannah Barnes (GBR)	May 4, 1993 (age 33)
Laura Brown (CAN)	November 27, 1986 (age 39)
Rushlee Buchanan (NZL)	January 20, 1988 (age 38)
Katie Hall (USA)	January 6, 1987 (age 39)
Cari Higgins (USA)	October 5, 1976 (age 49)
Abigail Mickey (USA)	July 3, 1994 (age 32)
Coryn Rivera (USA)	August 26, 1992 (age 34)

Rider	Date of birth
Alexis Ryan (USA)	August 18, 1994 (age 32)
Lauren Tamayo (USA)	October 25, 1983 (age 42)
Linda Villumsen (NZL)	April 9, 1985 (age 41)
Scotti Wilborne (USA)	January 7, 1983 (age 43)
Ruth Winder (USA)	July 9, 1993 (age 33)

=== 2014 ===
As of January 5, 2014.

Rider	Date of birth
Mara Abbott (USA)	November 14, 1985 (age 40)
Hannah Barnes (GBR)	May 4, 1993 (age 33)
Rushlee Buchanan (NZL)	January 20, 1988 (age 38)
Jacquelyn Crowell (USA)	February 16, 1988 (age 38)
Katie Hall (USA)	January 6, 1987 (age 39)
Cari Higgins (USA)	October 5, 1976 (age 49)

Rider	Date of birth
Sharon Laws (GBR)	July 7, 1974 (age 52)
Alison Powers (USA)	December 14, 1979 (age 46)
Coryn Rivera (USA)	August 26, 1992 (age 34)
Alexis Ryan (USA)	August 18, 1994 (age 32)
Lauren Tamayo (USA)	October 25, 1983 (age 42)
Ruth Winder (USA)	July 9, 1993 (age 33)

== Major wins ==
2014
Overall Tour Femenino de San Luis, Alison Powers

Combination classification, Alison Powers
Teams classification
Stage 1, Hannah Barnes
Stage 3, Alison Powers

Grand Prix de Oriente, Mara Abbott
Overall Vuelta a El Salvador, Mara Abbott

Stage 4, Mara Abbott

Overall Tour of the Gila, Mara Abbott

Teams classification
Stages 1 & 5, Mara Abbott
Stage 4, Alison Powers

Mountains classification The Women's Tour, Sharon Laws
Women's Tour of California time trial, Alison Powers
Blue Dome Criterium (NCC), Hannah Barnes
Brady Arts District Criterium (NCC), Hannah Barnes
River Parks Criterium (NCC), Coryn Rivera
River Parks Omnium (NCC), Coryn Rivera
Sprints classification North Star Grand Prix (NCC), Coryn Rivera

Stage 1 (ITT), Alison Powers
Stages 2 & 4, Coryn Rivera

Utah Cedar City Grand Prix, Alison Powers
Tour of Utah Women's edition, Coryn Rivera
Tour de Lafayette, Coryn Rivera
Tour de Francis Park, Coryn Rivera
Giro della Montagna, Coryn Rivera
Gateway Cup, Hannah Barnes
TD Bank Mayor's Cup, Coryn Rivera
2015
Milton Track Championships (Team Pursuit), Laura Brown
Gran Prix San Luis Femenino, Hannah Barnes
Mountains classification Tour Femenino de San Luis, Katie Hall

Young rider classification, Hannah Barnes
Stages 1 & 2, Hannah Barnes
Stage 5, Katie Hall

Sunny King Criterium, Hannah Barnes
Novant Health Invitational Criterium, Hannah Barnes
Stages 4 & 5 Redlands Bicycle Classic, Coryn Rivera
Stage 3 Joe Martin Stage Race, Coryn Rivera
Stage 4 Joe Martin Stage Race, Scotti Wilborne
Stage 4 Tour of the Gila, Hannah Barnes
Stage 1 Tour of California, Katie Hall
Armed Forces Association Cycling Classic, Coryn Rivera

Crystal Cup, Coryn Rivera

Stage 6 Tour of America's Dairyland, Cari Higgins
Stage 5 Women's Tour, Hannah Barnes
Stage 5 Thüringen Rundfahrt der Frauen, Coryn Rivera
Stage 6 Thüringen Rundfahrt der Frauen, Katie Hall
2016
Overall Tour Femenino de San Luis, Katie Hall

Mountains classification, Katie Hall
Stage 5, Katie Hall

Overall Joe Martin Stage Race, Coryn Rivera

Stage 1 (ITT), Linda Villumsen
Stage 2, Coryn Rivera

2017
Overall Joe Martin Stage Race, Ruth Winder

Young rider classification, Janelle Cole
Stages 1 (ITT) & 4, Ruth Winder

Overall Tour of the Gila, Tayler Wiles

Mountains classification, Katie Hall
Young rider classification, Ruth Winder
Team classification
Stages 1 & 5, Katie Hall

Overall Redlands Bicycle Classic, Ruth Winder

Stage 2, Katie Hall
Stage 5, Ruth Winder

Stage 2 Clasica 20 de Julio, Diana Peñuela
Stage 1 Vuelta a Colombia Femenina, Diana Peñuela
Mountains classification Tour of California, Katie Hall

Teams classification
Stage 2, Katie Hall

Overall Tour de Feminin-O cenu Českého Švýcarska, Ruth Winder

Points classification, Ruth Winder
Mountains classification, Tayler Wiles
Team classification
Stages 1 & 2, Ruth Winder

Mountains classification Thüringen Rundfahrt der Frauen, Tayler Wiles

Active rider classification Stage 2, Tayler Wiles
Stage 5, Tayler Wiles

Stage 1 Vuelta a Colombia Femenina, Diana Peñuela
2018
Stage 1 (ITT) Valley of the Sun, Leah Thomas
Stage 2 Valley of the Sun, Lauren Hall
Stage 2 Vuelta al Valle del Cauca, Diana Peñuela
Clásica a Zarzal, Diana Peñuela
Overall Joe Martin Stage Race, Katie Hall

Team classification
Stage 1, Diana Peñuela
Stage 3 (ITT), Katie Hall

Overall Tour of the Gila, Katie Hall

Stage 1, Katie Hall
Stage 5, Diana Peñuela

Overall Redlands Bicycle Classic, Katie Hall

Stage 2, Katie Hall

Overall Tour of California, Katie Hall

Mountains classification, Katie Hall
Team classification
Stage 2, Katie Hall

Grand Prix Cycliste de Gatineau, Lauren Hall
Overall Tour de Feminin-O cenu Českého Švýcarska, Leah Thomas

Mountains classification, Katie Hall
Team classification
Stage 3 (ITT), Lauretta Hanson

Chrono Champenois, Leah Thomas

== National and world champions ==
2014
New Zealand Road Race, Rushlee Buchanan
USA Time Trial, Alison Powers
USA Road Race, Alison Powers
USA Criterium, Coryn Rivera
New Zealand Criterium, Rushlee Buchanan
2015
Canada Track (Team Pursuit), Laura Brown
New Zealand Road Race, Linda Villumsen
World Time Trial, Linda Villumsen
2016
New Zealand Time Trial, Rushlee Buchanan
New Zealand Road Race, Rushlee Buchanan
USA Criterium, Lauren Tamayo
British Time Trial, Hayley Simmonds
2017
New Zealand Road Race, Rushlee Buchanan
New Zealand Track (Team Pursuit), Rushlee Buchanan
New Zealand Track (Points Race), Rushlee Buchanan
New Zealand Criterium, Rushlee Buchanan
Oceania Track (Team Pursuit), Rushlee Buchanan
2018
Oceania Track (Team Pursuit), Rushlee Buchanan

== See also ==
- UnitedHealthcare Pro Cycling (men's team)
