= Veronica Cornolti =

Italian cyclist (born 1994)

Personal information
- Full name: Veronica Cornolti
- Born: 30 December 1994 (age 31)

Cycling career
- Sport: Cycling
- Current team: Retired
- Disciplines: Road; Mountain biking
- Role: Rider

Amateur teams
- 2011: Nuovo Ciclismo Asti
- 2012: Footon Servetto–RPM Cicli

Professional team
- 2013–2015: Servetto Footon

Veronica Cornolti (born 30 December 1994) is an Italian former professional racing cyclist, who rode professionally between 2013 and 2015 for the Servetto Footon team. In her final season with the team, she finished ninth at the 2015 Gran Prix San Luis Femenino.

== See also ==
- List of 2015 UCI Women's Teams and riders
