= Fernanda da Silva (cyclist) =

Brazilian racing cyclist

Personal information
- Full name: Fernanda da Silva Souza
- Born: 15 November 1981 (age 44) Iguatu, Ceará

Cycling career
- Sport: Cycling
- Current team: Retired
- Discipline: Road
- Role: Rider

Amateur team
- 2011–2015: Funvic–Pindamonhangaba
Medal record
Representing Brazil
Women's road cycling
South American Games
Gold medal – first place	2014 Santiago	Individual time trial

Fernanda da Silva Souza (born 15 November 1981) is a Brazilian former road bicycle racer. She competed at the 2012 Summer Olympics in the Women's road race, but finished over the time limit.

== Major results ==
2008
2nd Copa América de Ciclismo
2010
National Road Championships

3rd Road race
3rd Time trial

2011
1st Prova Ciclística 9 de Julho
2012
4th Time trial, Pan American Road Championships
5th Grand Prix GSB
2013
10th Road race, Pan American Road Championships
2014
1st Time trial, South American Games
2nd Overall Tour Femenino de San Luis

1st Stage 4 (ITT)

9th Pan American Road Championships
2015
5th Gran Prix San Luis Femenino
