= Cuban Cycling Federation =

National governing body of cycle racing in Cuba

- Jurisdiction: National
- Founded: 1964
- Location: Havana, Cuba
- (Cuba)

The Cuban Cycling Federation or FCC (in Spanish: Federación Cubana de Ciclismo) is the national governing body of cycle racing in Cuba.

The FCC is a member of the UCI and COPACI.
