= 2014 Tour Femenino de San Luis =

Race details
- Dates: 14 January–18 January
- Stages: 5
- Distance: 268.8 km (167.0 mi)
- Winning time: 7h 26' 35"

Results
Jersey awarded to the overall winner	Winner	Alison Powers (United States)	(UnitedHealthcare Women's Team)
	Second	Fernanda da Silva (Brazil)	(Funvic Team)
	Third	Clemilda Fernandes (Brazil)	(Brazil national team)
Jersey awarded to the youth classification winner	Youth	Marlies Mejías (Cuba)	(Cuba national team)
Jersey awarded to the sprints classification winner	Sprints	Yudelmis Domínguez (Cuba)	(Cuba national team)
	Team	UnitedHealthcare Women's Team	

The 2014 Tour Femenino de San Luis was a stage race held in San Luis Province in Argentina, with a UCI rating of 2.2, from 14 January to 18 January. It was the first race of the 2014 Women's Elite cycling calendar and mirrored the men's cycling event, the Tour de San Luis.

== Teams ==
UCI Women's Teams:

UnitedHealthcare Women's Team

National Teams:

Nova School of Cycling
Acimproba-Orbai
Roberto Cycling School Braghette
Brunetta Bike
Metro Xilium
Punta Indio Adventure
Stemax Sports
Bicimania
Female Team SL
Team Mercedes SL
MTB Team
CFP Competition
Colombian National Team
Clos de Pirque-Trek
Cuban National Team
Brazilian National Team
Funvic Team

== Stages ==
=== Stage 1 ===
14 January 2014 – Villa Mercedes to Villa Mercedes, 63 km (39.1 mi)

Stage 1 Result

	Rider	Team	Time
1	Hannah Barnes (GBR)	UnitedHealthcare Women's Team	1h 51' 44"
2	Paola Muñoz (CHI)	Clos de Pirque-Trek	s.t.
3	Arlenis Sierra (CUB)	Cuba (national team)	s.t.
4	Yudelmis Domínguez (CUB)	Cuba (national team)	s.t.
5	Valeria Pintos (ARG)	Planeta Xilium	s.t.
6	Clemilda Fernandes (BRA)	Brazil (national team)	s.t.
7	Sérika Gulumá (COL)	Colombia (national team)	s.t.
8	Barbara Frish (ARG)	Planeta Xilium	s.t.
9	Bibiana Narváez (COL)	Colombia (national team)	s.t.
10	Marlies Mejías (CUB)	Cuba (national team)	s.t.

General Classification after Stage 1

	Rider	Team	Time
1	Hannah Barnes (GBR)	UnitedHealthcare Women's Team	1h 51' 44"
2	Paola Muñoz (CHI)	Clos de Pirque-Trek	+ 0"
3	Arlenis Sierra (CUB)	Cuba (national team)	+ 0"
4	Yudelmis Domínguez (CUB)	Cuba (national team)	+ 0"
5	Valeria Pintos (ARG)	Planeta Xilium	+ 0"
6	Clemilda Fernandes (BRA)	Brazil (national team)	+ 0"
7	Sérika Gulumá (COL)	Colombia (national team)	+ 0"
8	Barbara Frish (ARG)	Planeta Xilium	+ 0"
9	Bibiana Narváez (COL)	Colombia (national team)	+ 0"
10	Marlies Mejías (CUB)	Cuba (national team)	+ 0"

=== Stage 2 ===
15 January 2014 – Merlo to Merlo, 56.2 km (34.9 mi)

Stage 2 Result

	Rider	Team	Time
1	Clemilda Fernandes (BRA)	Brazil (national team)	1h 35' 02"
2	Marlies Mejías (CUB)	Cuba (national team)	s.t.
3	Luciene Ferreira (BRA)	Funvic Team	s.t.
4	Arlenis Sierra (CUB)	Cuba (national team)	s.t.
5	Fernanda da Silva (BRA)	Funvic Team	s.t.
6	Andreina Rivera (COL)	Funvic Team	+ 4"
7	Sérika Gulumá (COL)	Colombia (national team)	+ 4"
8	Cristiane Pereira (BRA)	Funvic Team	+ 4"
9	Paola Muñoz (CHI)	Clos de Pirque-Trek	+ 4"
10	Estefania Pilz (ARG)	Acimproba-Orbai	+ 4"

General Classification after Stage 2

	Rider	Team	Time
1	Clemilda Fernandes (BRA)	Brazil (national team)	3h 26' 46"
2	Arlenis Sierra (CUB)	Cuba (national team)	+ 0"
3	Marlies Mejías (CUB)	Cuba (national team)	+ 0"
4	Fernanda da Silva (BRA)	Funvic Team	+ 0"
5	Luciene Ferreira (BRA)	Funvic Team	+ 0"
6	Paola Muñoz (CHI)	Clos de Pirque-Trek	+ 4"
7	Sérika Gulumá (COL)	Colombia (national team)	+ 4"
8	Bibiana Narváez (COL)	Colombia (national team)	+ 4"
9	Rocío Parrado (COL)	Roberto Braguette	+ 4"
10	Valeria Pintos (ARG)	Planeta Xilium	+ 4"

=== Stage 3 ===
16 January 2014 – El Durazno to El Durazno, 60.2 km (37.4 mi)

Stage 3 Result

	Rider	Team	Time
1	Alison Powers (USA)	UnitedHealthcare Women's Team	1h 39' 25"
2	Alexis Ryan (USA)	UnitedHealthcare Women's Team	+ 3' 18"
3	Luciene Ferreira (BRA)	Funvic Team	+ 3' 18"
4	Clemilda Fernandes (BRA)	Brazil (national team)	+ 3' 18"
5	Marlies Mejías (CUB)	Cuba (national team)	+ 3' 18"
6	Arlenis Sierra (CUB)	Cuba (national team)	+ 3' 18"
7	Yudelmis Domínguez (CUB)	Cuba (national team)	+ 3' 18"
8	Paola Muñoz (CHI)	Clos de Pirque-Trek	+ 3' 18"
9	Talia Aguirre (ARG)	Planeta Xilium	+ 3' 18"
10	Valeria Pintos (ARG)	Planeta Xilium	+ 3' 18"

General Classification after Stage 3

	Rider	Team	Time
1	Alison Powers (USA)	UnitedHealthcare Women's Team	5h 06' 25"
2	Clemilda Fernandes (BRA)	Brazil (national team)	+ 3' 04"
3	Arlenis Sierra (CUB)	Cuba (national team)	+ 3' 04"
4	Marlies Mejías (CUB)	Cuba (national team)	+ 3' 04"
5	Fernanda da Silva (BRA)	Funvic Team	+ 3' 04"
6	Luciene Ferreira (BRA)	Funvic Team	+ 3' 04"
7	Paola Muñoz (CHI)	Clos de Pirque-Trek	+ 3' 08"
8	Bibiana Narváez (COL)	Colombia (national team)	+ 3' 08"
9	Valeria Pintos (ARG)	Planeta Xilium	+ 3' 08"
10	Alexis Ryan (USA)	UnitedHealthcare Women's Team	+ 3' 08"

=== Stage 4 ===
17 January 2014 – Juana Koslay, 10.6 km (6.6 mi) individual time trial (ITT)

Stage 4 Result

	Rider	Team	Time
1	Fernanda da Silva (BRA)	Funvic Team	13' 52"
2	Inés Gutiérrez (ARG)	Martin Garrido	+ 6"
3	Clemilda Fernandes (BRA)	Brazil (national team)	+ 15"
4	Sérika Gulumá (COL)	Colombia (national team)	+ 27"
5	Yudelmis Domínguez (CUB)	Cuba (national team)	+ 36"
6	Alison Powers (USA)	UnitedHealthcare Women's Team	+ 42"
7	Marlies Mejías (CUB)	Cuba (national team)	+ 42"
8	Barbara Frish (ARG)	Planeta Xilium	+ 42"
9	Luciene Ferreira (BRA)	Funvic Team	+ 44"
10	Cristiane Pereira (BRA)	Funvic Team	+ 50"

General Classification after Stage 4

	Rider	Team	Time
1	Alison Powers (USA)	UnitedHealthcare Women's Team	5h 20' 59"
2	Fernanda da Silva (BRA)	Funvic Team	+ 2' 22"
3	Clemilda Fernandes (BRA)	Brazil (national team)	+ 2' 37"
4	Sérika Gulumá (COL)	Colombia (national team)	+ 2' 53"
5	Marlies Mejías (CUB)	Cuba (national team)	+ 3' 04"
6	Luciene Ferreira (BRA)	Funvic Team	+ 3' 06"
7	Inés Gutiérrez (ARG)	Martin Garrido	+ 3' 07"
8	Arlenis Sierra (CUB)	Cuba (national team)	+ 3' 14"
9	Cristiane Pereira (BRA)	Funvic Team	+ 3' 16"
10	Valeria Pintos (ARG)	Planeta Xilium	+ 3' 18"

=== Stage 5 ===
18 January 2014 – San Luis to San Luis, 78.8 km (49.0 mi)

Stage 5 Result

	Rider	Team	Time
1	Arlenis Sierra (CUB)	Cuba (national team)	2h 05' 36"
2	Yudelmis Domínguez (CUB)	Cuba (national team)	s.t.
3	Alexis Ryan (USA)	UnitedHealthcare Women's Team	s.t.
4	Marlies Mejías (CUB)	Cuba (national team)	s.t.
5	Paola Muñoz (CHI)	Clos de Pirque-Trek	s.t.
6	Clemilda Fernandes (BRA)	Brazil (national team)	s.t.
7	Alison Powers (USA)	UnitedHealthcare Women's Team	s.t.
8	Talia Aguirre (ARG)	Planeta Xilium	s.t.
9	Barbara Frish (ARG)	Planeta Xilium	s.t.
10	Luciene Ferreira (BRA)	Funvic Team	s.t.

Final General Classification

	Rider	Team	Time
1	Alison Powers (USA)	UnitedHealthcare Women's Team	7h 26' 35"
2	Fernanda da Silva (BRA)	Funvic Team	+ 2' 22"
3	Clemilda Fernandes (BRA)	Brazil (national team)	+ 2' 37"
4	Sérika Gulumá (COL)	Colombia (national team)	+ 2' 53"
5	Marlies Mejías (CUB)	Cuba (national team)	+ 3' 04"
6	Luciene Ferreira (BRA)	Funvic Team	+ 3' 06"
7	Inés Gutiérrez (ARG)	Martin Garrido	+ 3' 07"
8	Arlenis Sierra (CUB)	Cuba (national team)	+ 3' 14"
9	Cristiane Pereira (BRA)	Funvic Team	+ 3' 16"
10	Valeria Pintos (ARG)	Planeta Xilium	+ 3' 18"

== Jerseys ==
denotes the overall race leader
denotes the highest placed rider who is under 23 years of age
denotes the combination classification leader
denotes he leader of the sprint competition
denotes the highest placed Argentinian rider

== Classification leadership ==
Stage	Winner	General classification	Young rider classification	Argentinian rider classification	Team classification
1	Hannah Barnes	Hannah Barnes	Hannah Barnes	Valeria Pintos	Cuba National Team
2	Clemilda Fernandes	Clemilda Fernandes	Arlenis Sierra	Valeria Pintos	FUNVIC
3	Alison Powers	Alison Powers	Arlenis Sierra	Valeria Pintos	UnitedHealthcare Women's Team
4	Fernanda da Silva	Alison Powers	Marlies Mejías	Inés Gutiérrez	UnitedHealthcare Women's Team
5	Arlenis Sierra	Alison Powers	Marlies Mejías	Inés Gutiérrez	UnitedHealthcare Women's Team
Final		Alison Powers	Marlies Mejías	Inés Gutiérrez	UnitedHealthcare Women's Team

== See also ==
- 2014 in women's road cycling
