= Weber La Segunda Ladies Power Team =

Team information
- UCI code: SLP
- Registered: Argentina
- Founded: 2015
- Discipline: Road
- Status: UCI Women's Team (2015–2017); National (2018–)

Key personnel
- General manager: Esteban Weimberg
- Team manager: Carlos Botasso

Team name history
- 2015 2016–2018 2018–: Itau Shimano Ladies Power Team; Weber–Shimano Ladies Power; Weber La Segunda Ladies Power Team

Weber La Segunda Ladies Power Team (UCI code SLP) is a professional women's cycling team, based in Argentina, which competed in elite road bicycle racing events such as the UCI Women's Road World Cup. In 2018 the team dropped from UCI status down to National level.

== Major wins ==
2016
Youth classification Tour Femenino de San Luis, Aranza Valentina Villalon Sánchez

2017
1st Overall Tour Internacional Femenino de Uruguay, Marlies Mejías Garcia

1st Stages 1, 2 & 4, Marlies Mejías Garcia

1st Overall Vuelta Femenina a San Juan, Marlies Mejías Garcia

1st Stages 1, 2, 3 (ITT) & 4, Marlies Mejías Garcia

1st Wilmington Grand Prix, Marlies Mejías Garcia
1st Overall The Armed Forces Cycling Classic, Marlies Mejías Garcia

1st Stage 1, Marlies Mejías Garcia

1st Stages 4 & 6 North Star Grand Prix, Marlies Mejías Garcia
1st Stage 9 Tour of America's Dairyland, Marlies Mejías Garcia
1st Overall Intelligentsia Cup, Marlies Mejías Garcia

1st Stages 1, 2, 6, 7, 9 & 10, Marlies Mejías Garcia

1st Overall Vuelta Antioquia Femenina, Rocio Parrado Guarnizo

2018
Overall Gran Premio Ciudad de Rio Tercero, Maribel Aguirre

Stages 1 & 2, Maribel Aguirre

Gran Premio Campagnolo, Mariela Analia Delgado
Stage 2 Clasica Esteban Chaves, Jessenia Meneses
Stage 1 Johnson City Omnium, Rocio Parrado

== Regional & National champions ==
2016
Chile Time Trial, Aranza Valentina Villalon Sánchez

2017
Argentina Junior Time Trial, Maribel Aguirre
Chile Time Trial, Aranza Valentina Villalon Sánchez
Juegos Bolivarianos Time Trial, Aranza Valentina Villalon Sánchez
Juegos Bolivarianos Track (Team pursuit), Camila Valbuena

2018
Argentina Road Race, Maribel Aguirre

2019
Argentina Track (Individual pursuit), Antonella Leonardi

2021
Argentina Junior Time Trial, Eliana Tocha
Argentina Junior Road Race, Eliana Tocha
Argentina Road Race, Maria Fadiga

== Team roster ==
Rider	Date of birth
Micaela Barroso (ARG)	11 February 1997 (age 29)
María Mercedes Fadiga (ARG)	18 December 1987 (age 38)
Cristina Irma Greve (ARG)	20 July 1987 (age 39)
Marlies Mejías Garcia (CUB)	29 December 1992 (age 33)
Jessenia Alejandora Meneses Gonzalez (COL)	18 June 1995 (age 31)

Rider	Date of birth
Rocio Parrado Guarnizo (COL)	29 November 1982 (age 43)
Caterin Elisabeth Previley (ARG)	20 December 1991 (age 34)
Camila Valbuena (COL)	18 February 1997 (age 29)
Aranza Valentina Villalón Sanchez (CHI)	16 June 1995 (age 31)
Anabel Yapura (ARG)	6 May 1998 (age 28)
