= Brazilian Cycling Confederation =

National governing body of cycle racing in Brazil

- Sport: Bicycle racing
- Jurisdiction: National
- Abbreviation: CBC
- Affiliation: UCI
- Headquarters: Londrina, Brazil

Official website
- www.cbc.esp.br
- (Brazil)

The Brazilian Cycling Confederation (Portuguese: Confederação Brasileira de Ciclismo, CBC) is the national governing body of cycle racing in Brazil.

The CBC is a member of the UCI and COPACI.
