= Pauliena Rooijakkers =

Dutch cyclist (born 1993)

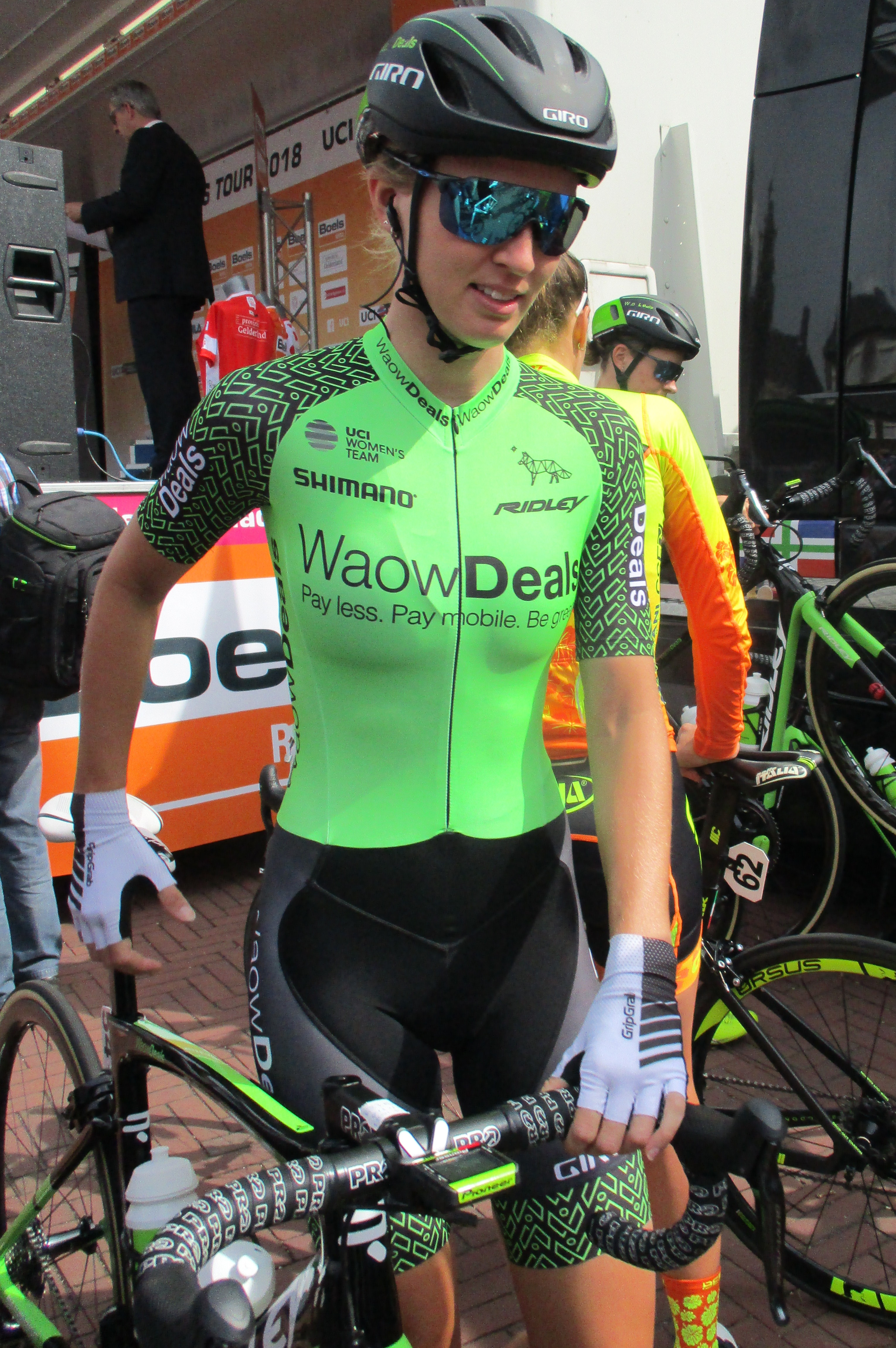
- Rooijakkers at 2018 Boels Rental Ladies Tour

Personal information
- Full name: Pauliena Rooijakkers
- Born: 12 May 1993 (age 33) Venray, Netherlands
- Height: 1.71 m (5 ft 7 in)
- Weight: 58 kg (128 lb)

Cycling career
- Sport: Cycling
- Current team: Fenix–Premier Tech
- Disciplines: Road; Mountain biking
- Role: Rider

Professional teams
- 2012–2013: Dolmans–Boels
- 2014–2017: Parkhotel Valkenburg Continental Team
- 2018–2021: Liv Racing
- 2022–2023: Canyon//SRAM
- 2024–2025: Fenix–Deceuninck
- 2026-: UAE Team Emirates XRG

Pauliena Rooijakkers (born 12 May 1993) is a road cyclist from the Netherlands, who currently rides for UCI Women's WorldTeam Fenix–Premier Tech. She participated at the 2012 UCI Road World Championships in the Women's team time trial for the Dolmans–Boels team.

In May 2026, Rooijakkers announced she would be taking maternity leave for the birth of her first child.

== Major results ==
2014
1st National Beach Race Championships
1st Panne Beach Endurance
2015
1st National Beach Race Championships
1st Egmond-pier-Egmond
2016
1st UEC European Beach Race Championships
1st National Beach Race Championships
1st Panne Beach Endurance
2017
1st National Beach Race Championships
1st Stage 7 Tour Cycliste Féminin International de l'Ardèche
5th La Classique Morbihan
7th Grand Prix de Plumelec-Morbihan Dames
9th Giro del Trentino Alto Adige-Sudtirol
10th Overall Emakumeen Bira
2018
1st UEC European Beach Race Championships
1st National Beach Race Championships
6th Durango-Durango Emakumeen Saria
8th Overall Emakumeen Euskal Bira
2019
1st Mountains classification Thüringen Ladies Tour
3rd Clásica de San Sebastián
10th Overall Tour of California
2020
3rd Giro dell'Emilia
2021
4th Overall Tour Cycliste Féminin International de l'Ardèche

1st Mountains classification
1st Combination classification

5th Durango-Durango Emakumeen Saria
7th Clásica de San Sebastián
8th Emakumeen Nafarroako Klasikoa
9th Overall Vuelta a Burgos
10th Overall Challenge by La Vuelta
10th Brabantse Pijl
2022
1st Durango-Durango Emakumeen Saria
2nd Overall Itzulia Women
3rd Overall Tour de Suisse Women

1st Mountains classification

4th Mont Ventoux Dénivelé Challenge
6th Brabantse Pijl
6th Postnord Vårgårda WestSweden TTT
10th Overall Grand Prix Elsy Jacobs
2023
UCI Gravel World Series

1st Gravel One Fifty
1st Houffa

8th Overall Tour Féminin des Pyrénées
10th Overall Itzulia Women
2024
3rd Overall Tour de France
4th Overall Giro d'Italia
6th Overall UAE Tour
6th La Flèche Wallonne
9th Overall La Vuelta Femenina
2025
9th Overall Tour de France

=== General classification results ===
Major Tours	2012	2013	2014	2015	2016	2017	2018	2019	2020	2021	2022	2023	2024
La Vuelta Femenina	Race did not exist											51	9
Giro Rosa	—	—	—	—	—	—	104	60	51	DNF	—	12	4
Tour de France Femmes	Race did not exist										22	—	3
Stage race	2012	2013	2014	2015	2016	2017	2018	2019	2020	2021	2022	2023	2024
The Women's Tour	DNE		—	—	—	—	76	51	NH	—	—	NH	—
Tour of California	Race did not exist			—	—	—	—	10	Not held				
Holland Ladies Tour	DNF	—	—	—	—	—	DNF	—	NH	—	—	—	
Challenge by La Vuelta	Race did not exist			—	—	—	—	—	—	10	25	Not held	
Emakumeen Euskal Bira	—	—	—	—	51	10	8	—	Not held				
Vuelta a Burgos	Race did not exist			—	—	—	—	—	NH	9	DNF	—	DNF
Itzulia Women	Race did not exist										2	10	19
UAE Tour	Race did not exist											30	6
Tour de Suisse	Not held									—	3	22	—
Tour of Norway	DNE		—	—	—	DNF	DNF	—	NH	—	—	—	NH

=== Classics results timeline ===
Monuments	2012	2013	2014	2015	2016	2017	2018	2019	2020	2021	2022	2023	2024
Tour of Flanders	DNF	—	—	55	—	—	DNF	—	—	—	—	—	—
Paris–Roubaix	Race did not exist								NH	—	—	—	—
Liège–Bastogne–Liège	Race did not exist					—	30	DNF	DNF	75	11	29	35
Classic	2012	2013	2014	2015	2016	2017	2018	2019	2020	2021	2022	2023	2024
Trofeo Alfredo Binda	DNF	—	—	—	DNF	DNF	61	DNF	NH	33	56	31	33
Strade Bianche	DNE			—	DNF	—	OTL	44	—	29	52	—	28
Gent–Wevelgem	—	—	102	—	—	—	—	—	34	—	—	—	—
Amstel Gold Race	Not held					46	59	DNF	NH	22	48	—	17
La Flèche Wallonne	52	—	41	DNF	46	—	41	DNF	29	—	11	58	6
GP de Plouay	57	—	—	64	58	81	DNF	27	54	30	—	37	
Open de Suède Vårgårda	—	—	DNF	—	—	—	DNF	—	Not held		41	Not held	
Classic Brugge–De Panne	Not held						DNF	—	—	—	52	—	—
The Philadelphia Cycling Classic	DNE	—	—	—	36	Not held							
La Course by Le Tour de France	DNE		—	—	—	—	16	35	17	19	Not held		
Tour of Guangxi	Race did not exist					—	—	63	Not held			—	
Clásica de San Sebastián	Race did not exist							3	—	7	Not held		

=== Major championships results ===
Event		2012	2013	2014	2015	2016	2017	2018	2019	2020	2021	2022	2023	2024
World Championships	Team time trial	9	—	—	—	—	—	—	Not held					
National Championships	Time trial	20	—	15	17	—	17	—	—	NH	—	—	—	—
National Championships	Road race	24	DNF	44	89	DNF	71	DNF	57	DNF	34	—	7	5

Legend
—	Did not compete
DNF	Did not finish
DNS	Did not start
DNE	Race did not exist
IP	In progress
NH	Not held
