= 2021 Vuelta a Burgos Feminas =

Women's road cycling stage race in Spain

2021 UCI Women's World Tour, race 9 of 18

Race details
- Dates: 20–23 May 2021
- Stages: 4
- Distance: 434 km (270 mi)
- Winning time: 11h 23' 55"

Results
Jersey awarded to the overall winner	Winner	Anna van der Breggen (NED)	(SD Worx)
	Second	Annemiek van Vleuten (NED)	(Movistar Team)
	Third	Demi Vollering (NED)	(SD Worx)
Jersey awarded to the points classification winner	Points	Anna van der Breggen (NED)	(SD Worx)
Jersey awarded to the mountains classification winner	Mountains	Anna van der Breggen (NED)	(SD Worx)
Jersey awarded to the youth classification winner	Youth	Niamh Fisher-Black (NZL)	(SD Worx)
	Team	SD Worx	

The 2021 Vuelta a Burgos Feminas was a road cycling stage race that took place in the province of Burgos in northern Spain between 20 and 23 May 2021. It was the sixth edition of the Vuelta a Burgos Feminas, and the first as a newly promoted event to the 2021 UCI Women's World Tour.

== Teams ==
Eight of the nine UCI Women's WorldTeams and twelve UCI Women's Continental Teams made up the twenty teams that participated the race. Six teams did not field the maximum allowed of six riders; these teams were Bizkaia–Durango, Cogeas–Mettler–Look, Eneicat–RBH Global–Martín Villa, InstaFund Racing, Liv Racing, and Rally Cycling, and each fielded five riders. 108 riders started the race, of which 92 finished.

UCI Women's WorldTeams

- Alé BTC Ljubljana
- Canyon//SRAM
- FDJ Nouvelle-Aquitaine Futuroscope
- Liv Racing
- Movistar Team
- SD Worx
- Team BikeExchange
- Trek–Segafredo

UCI Women's Continental Teams

- A.R. Monex
- Bizkaia–Durango
- Burgos Alimenta Women Cycling Sport
- Ceratizit–WNT Pro Cycling
- Cogeas–Mettler–Look
- Eneicat–RBH Global–Martín Villa
- InstaFund Racing
- Massi–Tactic
- Rally Cycling
- Río Miera–Cantabria Deporte
- Sopela Women's Team
- Valcar–Travel & Service

== Route ==
Stage characteristics and winners
Stage	Date	Course	Distance	Type	Stage winner
1	20 May	Villadiego to Sargentes de la Lora	100 km (62 mi)	Intermediate stage	Grace Brown (AUS)
2	21 May	Pedrosa de Valdeporres to Villarcayo	97 km (60 mi)	Flat stage	Anastasia Chursina (RUS)
3	22 May	Medina de Pomar to Ojo Guareña	115.4 km (71.7 mi)	Hilly stage	Cecilie Uttrup Ludwig (DEN)
4	23 May	Quintanar de la Sierra to Lagunas de Neila	121.6 km (75.6 mi)	Mountain stage	Anna van der Breggen (NED)
Total			434 km (270 mi)		

== Stages ==
=== Stage 1 ===
20 May 2021 – Villadiego to Sargentes de la Lora, 100 km (62 mi)

Stage 1 Result
Rank	Rider	Team	Time
1	Grace Brown (AUS)	Team BikeExchange	2h 28' 28"
2	Elise Chabbey (SUI)	Canyon//SRAM	+ 0"
3	Niamh Fisher-Black (NZL)	SD Worx	+ 0"
4	Arlenis Sierra (CUB)	A.R. Monex	+ 5"
5	Soraya Paladin (ITA)	Liv Racing	+ 5"
6	Sofia Bertizzolo (ITA)	Liv Racing	+ 5"
7	Elisa Longo Borghini (ITA)	Trek–Segafredo	+ 5"
8	Demi Vollering (NED)	SD Worx	+ 5"
9	Tereza Neumanová (CZE)	Burgos Alimenta Women Cycling Sport	+ 5"
10	Annemiek van Vleuten (NED)	Movistar Team	+ 5"

General classification after Stage 1
Rank	Rider	Team	Time
1	Grace Brown (AUS)	Team BikeExchange	2h 28' 28"
2	Elise Chabbey (SUI)	Canyon//SRAM	+ 0"
3	Niamh Fisher-Black (NZL)	SD Worx	+ 0"
4	Arlenis Sierra (CUB)	A.R. Monex	+ 5"
5	Soraya Paladin (ITA)	Liv Racing	+ 5"
6	Sofia Bertizzolo (ITA)	Liv Racing	+ 5"
7	Elisa Longo Borghini (ITA)	Trek–Segafredo	+ 5"
8	Demi Vollering (NED)	SD Worx	+ 5"
9	Tereza Neumanová (CZE)	Burgos Alimenta Women Cycling Sport	+ 5"
10	Annemiek van Vleuten (NED)	Movistar Team	+ 5"

=== Stage 2 ===
21 May 2021 – Pedrosa de Valdeporres to Villarcayo, 97 km (60 mi)

Stage 2 Result
Rank	Rider	Team	Time
1	Anastasia Chursina (RUS)	Alé BTC Ljubljana	2h 29' 28"
2	Alice Barnes (GBR)	Canyon//SRAM	+ 1' 11"
3	Amalie Dideriksen (DEN)	Trek–Segafredo	+ 1' 11"
4	Arlenis Sierra (CUB)	A.R. Monex	+ 1' 11"
5	Sandra Alonso (ESP)	Bizkaia–Durango	+ 1' 11"
6	Laura Tomasi (ITA)	Alé BTC Ljubljana	+ 1' 11"
7	Eugénie Duval (FRA)	FDJ Nouvelle-Aquitaine Futuroscope	+ 1' 11"
8	Jelena Erić (SRB)	Movistar Team	+ 1' 11"
9	Demi Vollering (NED)	SD Worx	+ 1' 11"
10	Marie Le Net (FRA)	FDJ Nouvelle-Aquitaine Futuroscope	+ 1' 11"

General classification after Stage 2
Rank	Rider	Team	Time
1	Elise Chabbey (SUI)	Canyon//SRAM	4h 59' 07"
2	Niamh Fisher-Black (NZL)	SD Worx	+ 0"
3	Grace Brown (AUS)	Team BikeExchange	+ 0"
4	Arlenis Sierra (CUB)	A.R. Monex	+ 5"
5	Demi Vollering (NED)	SD Worx	+ 5"
6	Tereza Neumanová (CZE)	Burgos Alimenta Women Cycling Sport	+ 5"
7	Katarzyna Niewiadoma (POL)	Canyon//SRAM	+ 5"
8	Tamara Dronova (RUS)	Cogeas–Mettler–Look	+ 5"
9	Sofia Bertizzolo (ITA)	Liv Racing	+ 5"
10	Ashleigh Moolman (RSA)	SD Worx	+ 5"

=== Stage 3 ===
22 May 2021 – Medina de Pomar to Ojo Guareña, 115.4 km (71.7 mi)

Stage 3 Result
Rank	Rider	Team	Time
1	Cecilie Uttrup Ludwig (DEN)	FDJ Nouvelle-Aquitaine Futuroscope	3h 00' 28"
2	Katarzyna Niewiadoma (POL)	Canyon//SRAM	+ 0"
3	Anna van der Breggen (NED)	SD Worx	+ 0"
4	Elisa Longo Borghini (ITA)	Trek–Segafredo	+ 0"
5	Niamh Fisher-Black (NZL)	SD Worx	+ 3"
6	Mavi García (ESP)	Alé BTC Ljubljana	+ 3"
7	Demi Vollering (NED)	SD Worx	+ 3"
8	Annemiek van Vleuten (NED)	Movistar Team	+ 3"
9	Ashleigh Moolman (RSA)	SD Worx	+ 3"
10	Soraya Paladin (ITA)	Liv Racing	+ 3"

General classification after Stage 3
Rank	Rider	Team	Time
1	Niamh Fisher-Black (NZL)	SD Worx	7h 59' 38"
2	Grace Brown (AUS)	Team BikeExchange	+ 0"
3	Katarzyna Niewiadoma (POL)	Canyon//SRAM	+ 2"
4	Elisa Longo Borghini (ITA)	Trek–Segafredo	+ 2"
5	Cecilie Uttrup Ludwig (DEN)	FDJ Nouvelle-Aquitaine Futuroscope	+ 2"
6	Anna van der Breggen (NED)	SD Worx	+ 2"
7	Demi Vollering (NED)	SD Worx	+ 5"
8	Ashleigh Moolman (RSA)	SD Worx	+ 5"
9	Soraya Paladin (ITA)	Liv Racing	+ 5"
10	Ane Santesteban (ESP)	Team BikeExchange	+ 5"

=== Stage 4 ===
23 May 2021 – Quintanar de la Sierra to Lagunas de Neila, 121.6 km (75.6 mi)

Stage 4 Result
Rank	Rider	Team	Time
1	Anna van der Breggen (NED)	SD Worx	3h 24' 15"
2	Annemiek van Vleuten (NED)	Movistar Team	+ 0"
3	Demi Vollering (NED)	SD Worx	+ 20"
4	Pauliena Rooijakkers (NED)	Liv Racing	+ 35"
5	Clara Koppenburg (GER)	Rally Cycling	+ 37"
6	Katrine Aalerud (NOR)	Movistar Team	+ 51"
7	Cecilie Uttrup Ludwig (DEN)	FDJ Nouvelle-Aquitaine Futuroscope	+ 1' 04"
8	Ashleigh Moolman (RSA)	SD Worx	+ 1' 06"
9	Grace Brown (AUS)	Team BikeExchange	+ 1' 09"
10	Amanda Spratt (AUS)	Team BikeExchange	+ 1' 17"

General classification after Stage 4
Rank	Rider	Team	Time
1	Anna van der Breggen (NED)	SD Worx	11h 23' 55"
2	Annemiek van Vleuten (NED)	Movistar Team	+ 3"
3	Demi Vollering (NED)	SD Worx	+ 23"
4	Clara Koppenburg (GER)	Rally Cycling	+ 59"
5	Katrine Aalerud (NOR)	Movistar Team	+ 1' 02"
6	Cecilie Uttrup Ludwig (DEN)	FDJ Nouvelle-Aquitaine Futuroscope	+ 1' 04"
7	Grace Brown (AUS)	Team BikeExchange	+ 1' 07"
8	Ashleigh Moolman (RSA)	SD Worx	+ 1' 09"
9	Pauliena Rooijakkers (NED)	Liv Racing	+ 1' 09"
10	Katarzyna Niewiadoma (POL)	Canyon//SRAM	+ 1' 25"

== Classification leadership table ==
Classification leadership by stage
Stage	Winner	General classification	Points classification	Mountains classification	Young rider classification	Spanish rider classification	Team classification
1	Grace Brown	Grace Brown	Grace Brown	Grace Brown	Niamh Fisher-Black	Mavi García	SD Worx
2	Anastasia Chursina	Elise Chabbey	Arlenis Sierra	Heidi Franz	Niamh Fisher-Black	Ane Santesteban	Alé BTC Ljubljana
3	Cecilie Uttrup Ludwig	Niamh Fisher-Black	Grace Brown	Niamh Fisher-Black	Niamh Fisher-Black	Ane Santesteban	Alé BTC Ljubljana
4	Anna van der Breggen	Anna van der Breggen	Anna van der Breggen	Anna van der Breggen	Niamh Fisher-Black	Ane Santesteban	SD Worx
Final		Anna van der Breggen	Anna van der Breggen	Anna van der Breggen	Niamh Fisher-Black	Ane Santesteban	SD Worx

- On stage 2, Elise Chabbey, who was second in the points classification, wore the green jersey, because first placed Grace Brown wore the violet jersey as the leader of the general classification. For the same reason, on stage 2, Heidi Franz, who was second in the mountains classification, wore the red jersey.
- On stage 4, Cecilie Uttrup Ludwig, who was second in the mountains classification, wore the red jersey, because first placed Niamh Fisher-Black wore the violet jersey as the leader of the general classification. For the same reason, on stage 4, Évita Muzic, who was second in the young rider classification, wore the white jersey.

== Final classification standings ==
Legend
Denotes the winner of the general classification	Denotes the winner of the mountains classification
Denotes the winner of the points classification	Denotes the winner of the young rider classification

=== General classification ===
Final general classification (1–10)
Rank	Rider	Team	Time
1	Anna van der Breggen (NED)	SD Worx	11h 23' 55"
2	Annemiek van Vleuten (NED)	Movistar Team	+ 3"
3	Demi Vollering (NED)	SD Worx	+ 23"
4	Clara Koppenburg (GER)	Rally Cycling	+ 59"
5	Katrine Aalerud (NOR)	Movistar Team	+ 1' 02"
6	Cecilie Uttrup Ludwig (DEN)	FDJ Nouvelle-Aquitaine Futuroscope	+ 1' 04"
7	Grace Brown (AUS)	Team BikeExchange	+ 1' 07"
8	Ashleigh Moolman (RSA)	SD Worx	+ 1' 09"
9	Pauliena Rooijakkers (NED)	Liv Racing	+ 1' 09"
10	Katarzyna Niewiadoma (POL)	Canyon//SRAM	+ 1' 25"

=== Points classification ===
Final points classification (1–10)
Rank	Rider	Team	Points
1	Anna van der Breggen (NED)	SD Worx	41
2	Demi Vollering (NED)	SD Worx	40
3	Grace Brown (AUS)	Team BikeExchange	37
4	Cecilie Uttrup Ludwig (DEN)	FDJ Nouvelle-Aquitaine Futuroscope	34
5	Annemiek van Vleuten (NED)	Movistar Team	34
6	Katarzyna Niewiadoma (POL)	Canyon//SRAM	30
7	Arlenis Sierra (CUB)	A.R. Monex	30
8	Niamh Fisher-Black (NZL)	SD Worx	29
9	Elisa Longo Borghini (ITA)	Trek–Segafredo	27
10	Anastasia Chursina (RUS)	Alé BTC Ljubljana	25

=== Mountains classification ===
Final mountains classification (1–10)
Rank	Rider	Team	Points
1	Anna van der Breggen (NED)	SD Worx	32
2	Annemiek van Vleuten (NED)	Movistar Team	25
3	Demi Vollering (NED)	SD Worx	20
4	Cecilie Uttrup Ludwig (DEN)	FDJ Nouvelle-Aquitaine Futuroscope	18
5	Pauliena Rooijakkers (NED)	Liv Racing	18
6	Niamh Fisher-Black (NZL)	SD Worx	15
7	Clara Koppenburg (GER)	Rally Cycling	12
8	Katrine Aalerud (NOR)	Movistar Team	11
9	Elise Chabbey (SUI)	Canyon//SRAM	11
10	Grace Brown (AUS)	Team BikeExchange	10

=== Young rider classification ===
Final young rider classification (1–10)
Rank	Rider	Team	Time
1	Niamh Fisher-Black (NZL)	SD Worx	11h 25' 36"
2	Évita Muzic (FRA)	FDJ Nouvelle-Aquitaine Futuroscope	+ 4"
3	Mikayla Harvey (NZL)	Canyon//SRAM	+ 27"
4	Anna Shackley (GBR)	SD Worx	+ 59"
5	Andrea Ramírez (MEX)	A.R. Monex	+ 2' 16"
6	Barbara Malcotti (ITA)	Valcar–Travel & Service	+ 2' 21"
7	Tereza Neumanová (CZE)	Burgos Alimenta Women Cycling Sport	+ 2' 24"
8	Anna Baidak (RUS)	Eneicat–RBH Global–Martín Villa	+ 4' 51"
9	Federica Piergiovanni (ITA)	Valcar–Travel & Service	+ 6' 24"
10	Yuliia Biriukova (UKR)	Eneicat–RBH Global–Martín Villa	+ 6' 53"

=== Spanish rider classification ===
Final Spanish rider classification (1–10)
Rank	Rider	Team	Time
1	Ane Santesteban (ESP)	Team BikeExchange	11h 26' 01"
2	Eider Merino Cortazar (ESP)	A.R. Monex	+ 27"
3	Mavi García (ESP)	Alé BTC Ljubljana	+ 1' 30"
4	Lucía González Blanco (ESP)	Bizkaia–Durango	+ 16' 55"
5	Martina Moreno (ESP)	Massi–Tactic	+ 17' 41"
6	Isabel Martín (ESP)	Río Miera–Cantabria Deporte	+ 18' 36"
7	Ariana Gilabert (ESP)	Bizkaia–Durango	+ 19' 26"
8	Sandra Alonso (ESP)	Bizkaia–Durango	+ 21' 07"
9	Alicia González Blanco (ESP)	Movistar Team	+ 23' 15"
10	Susana Pérez (ESP)	Río Miera–Cantabria Deporte	+ 25' 10"

=== Team classification ===
Final team classification (1–10)
Rank	Team	Time
1	Alé BTC Ljubljana	34h 13' 12"
2	Team BikeExchange	+ 3' 21"
3	Liv Racing	+ 3' 35"
4	Canyon//SRAM	+ 4' 19"
5	Movistar Team	+ 5' 51"
6	Alé BTC Ljubljana	+ 5' 52"
7	A.R. Monex	+ 7' 12"
8	FDJ Nouvelle-Aquitaine Futuroscope	+ 11' 01"
9	Rally Cycling	+ 15' 55"
10	Ceratizit–WNT Pro Cycling	+ 15' 58"
