= 2017 Emakumeen Euskal Bira =

2018 Emakumeen Euskal Bira
2017 UCI Women's Europe Tour

Race details
- Dates: 17 – 21 May 2017
- Stages: 5
- Distance: 371 km (231 mi)
- Winning time: 10h 10' 54"

Results
	Winner	Ashleigh Moolman (RSA)	(Cervélo–Bigla Pro Cycling)
	Second	Annemiek van Vleuten (NED)	(Orica–Scott)
	Third	Katrin Garfoot (AUS)	(Orica–Scott)

The 30th running of the Emakumeen Euskal Bira was held from 17 to 21 May 2017. Raced over five stages in the Basque Country, Spain, it had a total distance of 37 km. South African rider Ashleigh Moolman won the event after she won the final stage to Errenteria.

== Teams ==
Twenty-one teams participated in the race:

Professional women's teams

- Alé–Cipollini
- Bizkaia–Durango
- FDJ Nouvelle-Aquitaine Futuroscope
- Orica–Scott
- Top Girls Fassa Bortolo
- Aromitalia Vaiano
- Cervélo–Bigla Pro Cycling
- Giusfredi–Bianchi
- Parkhotel Valkenburg–Destil
- Bepink–Cogeas
- Drops
- Lointek
- S.C. Michela Fanini Rox
- Team WNT
- Team VéloCONCEPT

National teams

- Spain
- Russia

Women's amateur teams

- Edosof
- Sportpublic
- Global-Podium
- Jurado Técnico

== Route ==
Stage characteristics and winners
Stage	Date	Course	Distance	Type	Stage winner
1	17 May	Iurreta to Iurreta	50 km (31 mi)	Flat stage	Marta Bastianelli (ITA)
2	18 May	Markina-Xemein to Markina-Xemein	90.2 km (56.0 mi)	Flat stage	Amanda Spratt (AUS)
3	19 May	Antzuola to Antzuola	77.6 km (48.2 mi)	Flat stage	Katrin Garfoot (AUS)
4	20 May	Etxarri-Aranatz to Etxarri-Aranatz	58 km (36 mi)	Medium mountain stage	Annemiek van Vleuten (NED)
5	21 May	Errenteria to Errenteria	95 km (59 mi)	Medium mountain stage	Ashleigh Moolman (RSA)

== Results ==
=== Stage 1 ===
Stage 1 result

Rank	Rider	Team	Time
1	Marta Bastianelli (ITA)	Alé–Cipollini	1h 17' 38"
2	Katie Archibald (GBR)	Team WNT	s.t.
3	Gracie Elvin (AUS)	Orica–Scott	s.t.
4	Christina Siggaard (DEN)	Team VéloCONCEPT	s.t.
5	Rasa Leleivytė (LTU)	Aromitalia Vaiano	s.t.
6	Annemiek van Vleuten (NED)	Orica–Scott	s.t.
7	Eva Buurman (NED)	Parkhotel Valkenburg–Destil	s.t.
8	Ashleigh Moolman (RSA)	Cervélo–Bigla Pro Cycling	s.t.
9	Michela Balducci (ITA)	Giusfredi–Bianchi	s.t.
10	Alicia González Blanco (ESP)	Lointek	s.t.

General classification after Stage 1

Rank	Rider	Team	Time
1	Marta Bastianelli (ITA)	Alé–Cipollini	1h 17' 28"
2	Katie Archibald (GBR)	Team WNT	+ 4"
3	Gracie Elvin (AUS)	Orica–Scott	+ 6"
4	Cecilie Uttrup Ludwig (DEN)	Cervélo–Bigla Pro Cycling	+ 7"
5	Ashleigh Moolman (RSA)	Cervélo–Bigla Pro Cycling	+ 8"
6	Ane Santesteban (ESP)	Alé–Cipollini	+ 9"
7	Christina Siggaard (DEN)	Team VéloCONCEPT	+ 10"
8	Rasa Leleivytė (LTU)	Aromitalia Vaiano	s.t.
9	Annemiek van Vleuten (NED)	Orica–Scott	s.t.
10	Eva Buurman (NED)	Parkhotel Valkenburg–Destil	s.t.

=== Stage 2 ===
Stage 2 result

Rank	Rider	Team	Time
1	Amanda Spratt (AUS)	Orica–Scott	2h 28' 12"
2	Ane Santesteban (ESP)	Alé–Cipollini	+ 2"
3	Marta Bastianelli (ITA)	Alé–Cipollini	+ 26"
4	Gracie Elvin (AUS)	Orica–Scott	s.t.
5	Eva Buurman (NED)	Parkhotel Valkenburg–Destil	s.t.
6	Katie Archibald (GBR)	Team WNT	s.t.
7	Ashleigh Moolman (RSA)	Cervélo–Bigla Pro Cycling	s.t.
8	Rasa Leleivytė (LTU)	Aromitalia Vaiano	s.t.
9	Abi Van Twisk (GBR)	Drops	s.t.
10	Hanna Solovey (UKR)	Parkhotel Valkenburg–Destil	s.t.

General classification after Stage 2

Rank	Rider	Team	Time
1	Amanda Spratt (AUS)	Orica–Scott	3h 45' 40"
2	Ane Santesteban (ESP)	Alé–Cipollini	+ 5"
3	Marta Bastianelli (ITA)	Alé–Cipollini	+ 22"
4	Katie Archibald (GBR)	Team WNT	+ 28"
5	Gracie Elvin (AUS)	Orica–Scott	+ 32"
6	Ashleigh Moolman (RSA)	Cervélo–Bigla Pro Cycling	+ 34"
7	Soraya Paladin (ITA)	Alé–Cipollini	+ 35"
8	Katrin Garfoot (AUS)	Orica–Scott	s.t.
9	Eva Buurman (NED)	Parkhotel Valkenburg–Destil	+ 36"
10	Rasa Leleivytė (LTU)	Aromitalia Vaiano	s.t.

=== Stage 3 ===
Stage 3 result

Rank	Rider	Team	Time
1	Katrin Garfoot (AUS)	Orica–Scott	2h 01' 04"
2	Soraya Paladin (ITA)	Alé–Cipollini	+ 34"
3	Annemiek van Vleuten (NED)	Orica–Scott	s.t.
4	Ashleigh Moolman (RSA)	Cervélo–Bigla Pro Cycling	s.t.
5	Amanda Spratt (AUS)	Orica–Scott	s.t.
6	Nikola Nosková (CZE)	Bepink–Cogeas	s.t.
7	Ann-Sophie Duyck (BEL)	Drops	s.t.
8	Susanna Zorzi (ITA)	Drops	s.t.
9	Elise Maes (LUX)	Team WNT	s.t.
10	Asja Paladin (ITA)	Top Girls Fassa Bortolo	s.t.

General classification after Stage 3

Rank	Rider	Team	Time
1	Katrin Garfoot (AUS)	Orica–Scott	5h 47' 06"
2	Amanda Spratt (AUS)	Orica–Scott	+ 12"
3	Ane Santesteban (ESP)	Alé–Cipollini	+ 17"
4	Soraya Paladin (ITA)	Alé–Cipollini	+ 40"
5	Ashleigh Moolman (RSA)	Cervélo–Bigla Pro Cycling	+ 44"
6	Annemiek van Vleuten (NED)	Orica–Scott	s.t.
7	Nikola Nosková (CZE)	Bepink–Cogeas	+ 47"
8	Hanna Solovey (UKR)	Parkhotel Valkenburg–Destil	+ 48"
9	Cecilie Uttrup Ludwig (DEN)	Cervélo–Bigla Pro Cycling	+ 50"
10	Elise Maes (LUX)	Team WNT	+ 53"

=== Stage 4 ===
Stage 4 result

Rank	Rider	Team	Time
1	Annemiek van Vleuten (NED)	Orica–Scott	1h 50' 47"
2	Nikola Nosková (CZE)	Bepink–Cogeas	s.t.
3	Ashleigh Moolman (RSA)	Cervélo–Bigla Pro Cycling	s.t.
4	Pauliena Rooijakkers (NED)	Parkhotel Valkenburg–Destil	+ 6"
5	Cecilie Uttrup Ludwig (DEN)	Cervélo–Bigla Pro Cycling	s.t.
6	Hayley Simmonds (GBR)	Team WNT	s.t.
7	Eider Merino Cortazar (ESP)	Lointek	s.t.
8	Katrin Garfoot (AUS)	Orica–Scott	s.t.
9	Shara Gillow (AUS)	FDJ Nouvelle-Aquitaine Futuroscope	+ 24"
10	Hanna Solovey (UKR)	Parkhotel Valkenburg–Destil	s.t.

General classification after Stage 4

Rank	Rider	Team	Time
1	Katrin Garfoot (AUS)	Orica–Scott	7h 37' 59"
2	Annemiek van Vleuten (NED)	Orica–Scott	+ 28"
3	Amanda Spratt (AUS)	Orica–Scott	+ 30"
4	Ashleigh Moolman (RSA)	Cervélo–Bigla Pro Cycling	+ 34"
5	Nikola Nosková (CZE)	Bepink–Cogeas	+ 35"
6	Ane Santesteban (ESP)	Alé–Cipollini	s.t.
7	Cecilie Uttrup Ludwig (DEN)	Cervélo–Bigla Pro Cycling	+ 50"
8	Eider Merino Cortazar (ESP)	Lointek	+ 53"
9	Hayley Simmonds (GBR)	Team WNT	+ 1' 00"
10	Pauliena Rooijakkers (NED)	Parkhotel Valkenburg–Destil	s.t.

=== Stage 5 ===
Stage 5 result

Rank	Rider	Team	Time
1	Ashleigh Moolman (RSA)	Cervélo–Bigla Pro Cycling	2h 32' 33"
2	Annemiek van Vleuten (NED)	Orica–Scott	+ 13"
3	Katrin Garfoot (AUS)	Orica–Scott	+ 38"
4	Eider Merino Cortazar (ESP)	Lointek	+ 50"
5	Ann-Sophie Duyck (BEL)	Drops	+ 1' 21"
6	Cecilie Uttrup Ludwig (DEN)	Cervélo–Bigla Pro Cycling	+ 1' 32"
7	Amanda Spratt (AUS)	Orica–Scott	s.t.
8	Nikola Nosková (CZE)	Bepink–Cogeas	s.t.
9	Shara Gillow (AUS)	FDJ Nouvelle-Aquitaine Futuroscope	s.t.
10	Pauliena Rooijakkers (NED)	Parkhotel Valkenburg–Destil	+ 1' 41"

General classification after Stage 5

Rank	Rider	Team	Time
1	Ashleigh Moolman (RSA)	Cervélo–Bigla Pro Cycling	10h 10' 54"
2	Annemiek van Vleuten (NED)	Orica–Scott	+ 10"
3	Katrin Garfoot (AUS)	Orica–Scott	+ 12"
4	Eider Merino Cortazar (ESP)	Lointek	+ 1' 21"
5	Amanda Spratt (AUS)	Orica–Scott	+ 1' 40"
6	Nikola Nosková (CZE)	Bepink–Cogeas	+ 1' 43"
7	Cecilie Uttrup Ludwig (DEN)	Cervélo–Bigla Pro Cycling	+ 2' 00"
8	Ann-Sophie Duyck (BEL)	Drops	+ 2' 10"
9	Hayley Simmonds (GBR)	Team WNT	+ 2' 19"
10	Pauliena Rooijakkers (NED)	Parkhotel Valkenburg–Destil	s.t.

== See also ==
- 2017 in women's road cycling
