= Belén López (cyclist) =

Spanish bicycle racer

Personal information
- Full name: Belén López Morales
- Born: 18 April 1984 (age 42) Rota, Andalusia, Spain

Cycling career
- Sport: Cycling
- Current team: Massi–Tactic
- Discipline: Road
- Role: Retired

Amateur teams
- 2006–2008: Comunidad Valenciana
- 2018: DC Ride–Vector

Professional teams
- 2009–2017: Lointek
- 2019–2022: Massi–Tactic

Belén López Morales (born 18 April 1984 in Rota, Andalusia) is a Spanish former professional cyclist, who rode for UCI Women's Continental Team Massi–Tactic between 2019 and 2022.

== Major results ==
2007
1st Gran Premio San Isidro
2008
3rd Gran Premio San Isidro
3rd Trofeo Xerox Ega
2009
1st Premio Ayuntamiento Sopelana
1st Trofeo Diputación de Málaga
1st Gran Premio Ayuntamiento de Elorrio
2nd Road race, National Road Championships
2010
1st Iurreta Criterium
3rd Gran Premio San Isidro
2011
1st Gran Premio San Isidro
2nd Trofeo Gobierno de La Rioja
3rd Time trial, National Road Championships
2012
3rd Zalla Criterium
3rd Time trial, National Road Championships
2013
1st Gran Premio Txori-Erri
1st Clasica de la Montaña Palentina
1st Villabona-Zizurkil
1st Tolosa Criterium
2nd Bergara-Osintxu
2nd Trofeo Gobierno de La Rioja
3rd Time trial, National Road Championships
3rd Balmaseda Criterium
5th Overall Vuelta Internacional Femenina a Costa Rica
7th Overall Tour Féminin en Limousin
10th Overall Tour Languedoc Roussillon
2014
2nd Time trial, National Road Championships
2015
1st Overall Vuelta a Burgos Feminas

1st Stage 1 (ITT)

2017
1st Time trial, Andalusian Road Championships
2018
1st Time trial, Andalusian Road Championships
5th ReVolta
8th Overall Vuelta a Burgos Feminas
