= Ashleigh Moolman Pasio =

South African cyclist (born 1985)

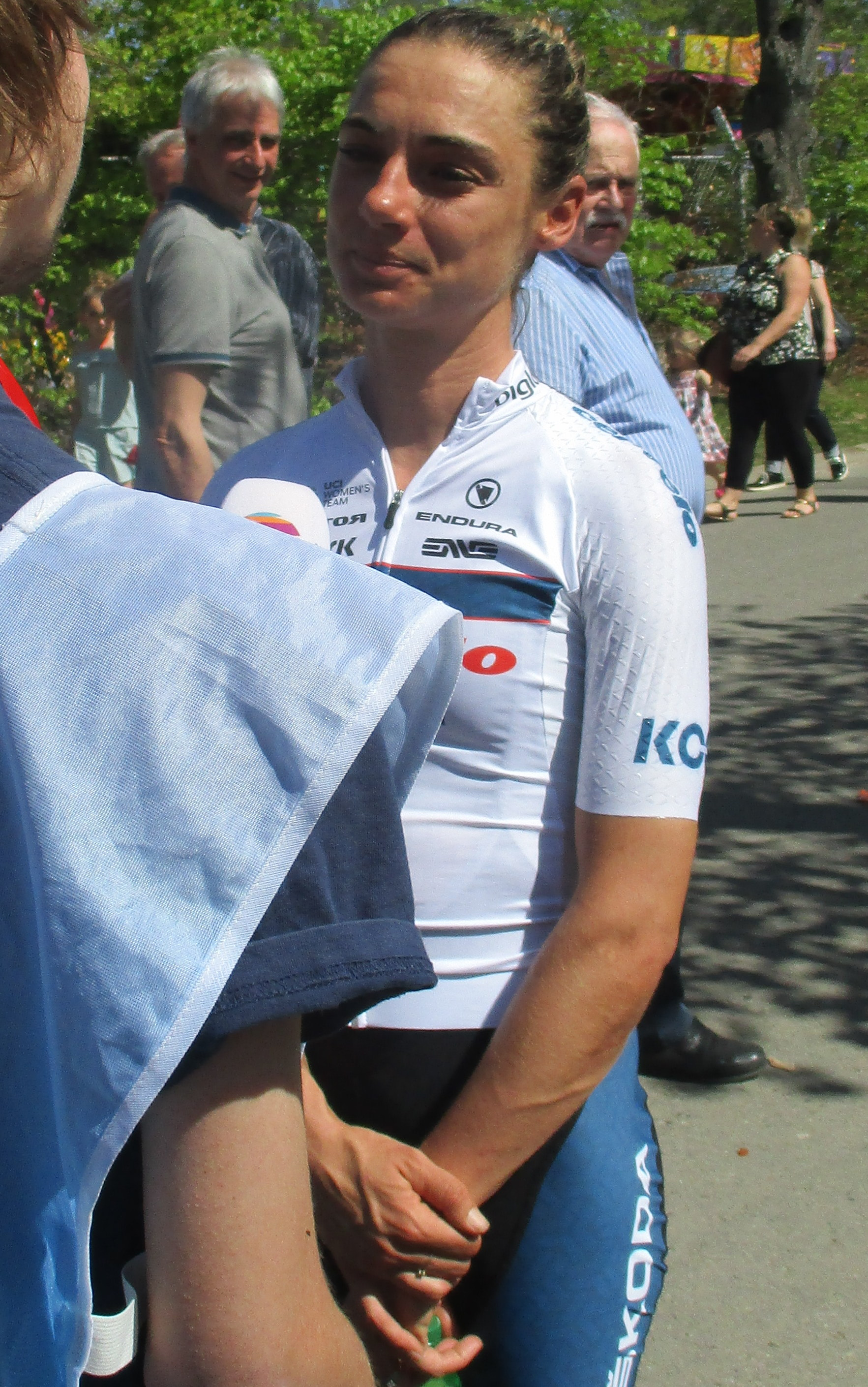
- Moolman Pasio at the 2018 La Flèche Wallonne

Personal information
- Full name: Ashleigh Moolman Pasio
- Born: Ashleigh Moolman; 9 December 1985 (age 40) Pretoria, South Africa

Cycling career
- Sport: Cycling
- Current team: AG Insurance–Soudal
- Discipline: Road
- Role: Rider

Amateur team
- 2008–2009: Toyota Cycling Team

Professional teams
- 2010–2013: Lotto Ladies Team
- 2014: Team Hitec Products
- 2015–2018: Bigla Pro Cycling Team
- 2019–2020: CCC - Liv
- 2021–2022: SD Worx
- 2023–: AG Insurance–Soudal–Quick-Step

Major wins
- Major Tours Giro d'Italia 1 individual stage (2021) Stage races Tour de Romandie (2022) Auensteiner–Radsporttage (2015, 2016) One-day races and Classics National Road Race Championships (2012–2015, 2019, 2020) National Time Trial Championships (2013–2015, 2017, 2020) Holland Hills Classic (2013) La Classique Morbihan (2017) Grand Prix de Plumelec-Morbihan (2017)
Medal record
Women's Road Cycling
Representing South Africa
Commonwealth Games
Bronze medal – third place	2014 Glasgow	Road race
African Championships
Gold medal – first place	2011 Asmara	Road race
Gold medal – first place	2012 Ouagadugou	Time trial
Gold medal – first place	2012 Ouagadugou	Road race
Gold medal – first place	2013 Sharm el-Sheikh	Time trial
Gold medal – first place	2013 Sharm el-Sheikh	Road race
Gold medal – first place	2015 Wartburg	Team time trial
Gold medal – first place	2015 Wartburg	Time trial
Gold medal – first place	2015 Wartburg	Road race
Silver medal – second place	2011 Asmara	Time trial
Silver medal – second place	2024 Eldoret	Time trial
Representing Cervélo–Bigla Pro Cycling
World Championships
Bronze medal – third place	2016 Doha	Team time trial
Women's esports
Representing South Africa
World Championships
Gold medal – first place	2020 Watopia	Women's race

Ashleigh Moolman Pasio (née Moolman; born 9 December 1985) is a South African professional road bicycle racer, who rides for UCI Women's WorldTeam AG Insurance–Soudal. She competed at the 2012 Summer Olympics in the Women's road race, finishing 16th and in the Women's time trial finishing 24th.

On 9 December 2020, she won the first edition of the UCI Cycling Esports World Championships, organised on the online cycling platform Zwift.

== Career ==
She tried to start a career in triathlon but after discovering her talent in cycling, and a series of injuries, dedicated herself fully to professional road cycling.

At the 2014 Commonwealth Games, she won the bronze medal in the women's road race and finished 15th in the women's individual time trial.

=== Bigla Pro Cycling Team (2015–2018) ===
After spending one season riding for Team Hitec Products, in September 2014 it was announced that Moolman Pasio had signed an initial two-year deal with the Bigla Pro Cycling Team from 2015.

In 2018, she finished second overall in the Giro Rosa, and La Flèche Wallonne Féminine. She also took the final podium place at La Course by Le Tour de France. She took two victories during the season, winning La Classique Morbihan and the Grand Prix de Plumelec-Morbihan on consecutive days, just as she had done in 2017.

=== CCC Liv (2019–2020) ===
In 2019, Moolman Pasio won her fifth South African National Road Race Championships title, and her first since 2015, finishing almost two minutes clear of her closest rival in Tshwane. Moolman Pasio took two further victories during the season, winning July's Emakumeen Nafarroako Klasikoa, and then won the time trial at the African Games the following month. She finished third overall at both the Setmana Ciclista Valenciana, and the Tour of California, fourth overall at the Giro Rosa, and fifth in La Course by Le Tour de France.

In 2020, prior to the COVID-19 pandemic-enforced suspension of racing, Moolman Pasio won her sixth South African National Road Race Championships title, as well as a fifth title in the South African National Time Trial Championships.

=== SD Worx (2021–2022) ===
In September 2020, Moolman Pasio signed a two-year contract with the Boels–Dolmans team, later renamed SD Worx, from the 2021 season.

At the 2021 Giro Rosa, Moolman Pasio finished second overall as part of a SD Worx clean sweep of the podium. Having finished second to teammate Anna van der Breggen on the second stage to the ski resort of Prato Nevoso, Moolman Pasio soloed to a stage victory – her first victory at the race – on the penultimate day, a summit finish on the Matajur. She ultimately finished 1' 43" down on Van der Breggen, while also finishing second in the mountains classification behind Lucinda Brand. She also finished second at the Ladies Tour of Norway, having been the closest competitor to Annemiek van Vleuten on the uphill finish to the Norefjell ski resort, before being dropped with around 2 kilometres (1.2 miles) to go.

Moolman Pasio recorded top-ten finishes in each of her first six starts in 2022, the best of which was a podium finish – third place – at Strade Bianche. In July, she was named as one of the pre-race favourites for the first edition of the Tour de France Femmes. She finished third on the third stage, but withdrew from the race before the final stage due to illness. She finished the season with a stage win and the overall victory at the inaugural Tour de Romandie Féminin, her first victories on the UCI Women's World Tour. She dropped Annemiek van Vleuten on the summit finish to Thyon, ultimately winning the stage by 26 seconds and the overall race the following day by 30 seconds – as a result, she became the first African rider to win on the UCI Women's World Tour.

=== AG Insurance–Soudal–Quick-Step ===
Having previously stated that she was going to retire at the end of the 2022 season, Moolman Pasio signed a one-year contract for the 2023 season with AG Insurance–NXTG, later renamed AG Insurance–Soudal–Quick-Step. In her first race with the team, the Setmana Ciclista Valenciana, Moolman Pasio won the third stage of the race in a three-up sprint against Amanda Spratt and Annemiek van Vleuten. She ultimately finished the race second overall, one second down on teammate Justine Ghekiere. Moolman Pasio's next podium finishes came in Spain in May; she won another three-rider sprint, this time against Ane Santesteban and Claire Steels, to win Durango-Durango Emakumeen Saria, and then finished third overall at the Vuelta a Burgos Feminas later the same week.

== Personal life ==
Moolman Pasio has a degree in chemical engineering from Stellenbosch University, where she met her future husband, semi-professional XTERRA triathlete Carl Pasio. The couple own Rocacorba Cycling, a cyclotourism business, operating from a 17th-century estate in Porqueres, Spain.

== Major results ==
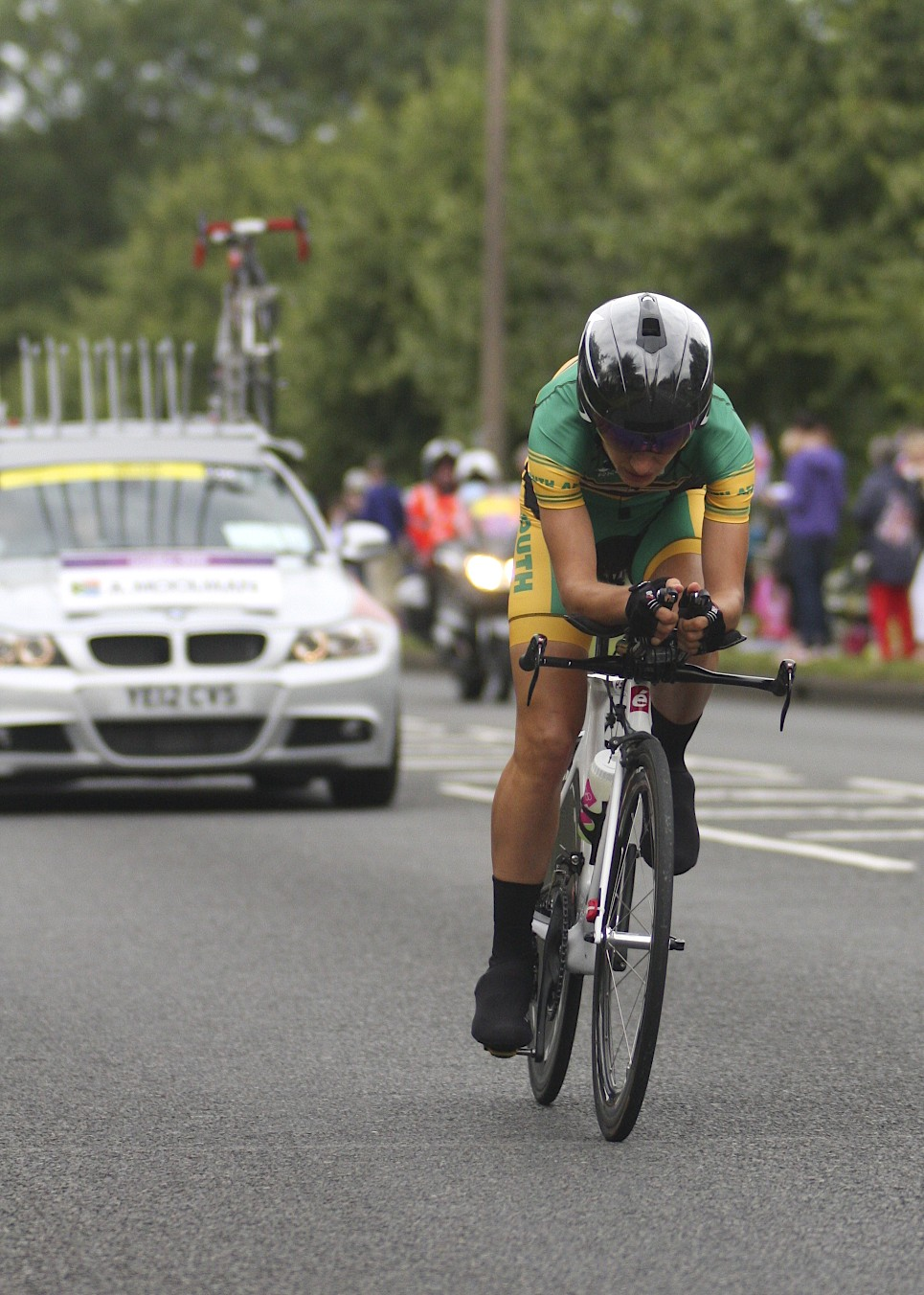
Moolman during the road time trial at the 2012 London Olympics

2009
2nd Road race, National Road Championships
2010
10th Open de Suède Vårgårda TTT
2011
African Road Championships

1st Road race
2nd Time trial

National Road Championships

2nd Time trial
4th Road race

2nd Overall Tour Cycliste Féminin International de l'Ardèche
6th Overall Iurreta-Emakumeen Bira

1st Mountains classification

9th Halle-Buizingen
9th Durango-Durango Emakumeen Saria
9th Open de Suède Vårgårda TTT
2012
African Road Championships

1st Road race
1st Time trial

National Road Championships

1st Road race
2nd Time trial

1st Mountains classification, Grand Prix Elsy Jacobs
2nd Overall Tour Cycliste Féminin International de l'Ardèche

1st Stage 2 (ITT)

3rd Overall Tour de Free State

1st Stage 4

5th La Flèche Wallonne
10th Overall Giro d'Italia
10th Trofeo Alfredo Binda
2013
African Road Championships

1st Road race
1st Time trial

National Road Championships

1st Road race
1st Time trial

1st Holland Hills Classic
2nd Overall Tour Cycliste Féminin International de l'Ardèche
3rd La Flèche Wallonne
4th Overall Tour Languedoc Roussillon
5th Durango-Durango Emakumeen Saria
8th Overall Giro d'Italia
2014
National Road Championships

1st Road race
1st Time trial

2nd Le Samyn
3rd Road race, Commonwealth Games
4th Overall Emakumeen Euskal Bira
5th La Flèche Wallonne
5th Gooik–Geraardsbergen–Gooik
8th Omloop Het Nieuwsblad
8th Durango-Durango Emakumeen Saria
10th Holland Hills Classic
2015
African Road Championships

1st Road race
1st Time trial
1st Team time trial

National Road Championships

1st Road race
1st Time trial

1st Overall Auensteiner–Radsporttage

1st Mountains classification
1st Stage 3

1st 94.7 Cycle Challenge
2nd Overall Emakumeen Euskal Bira
2nd Giro dell'Emilia
4th Overall Giro d'Italia
4th Strade Bianche
4th La Flèche Wallonne
4th GP de Plouay
4th Crescent Women World Cup Vargarda TTT
6th Le Samyn
7th Overall Festival Luxembourgeois du Elsy Jacobs
7th Chrono des Nations
10th Trofeo Alfredo Binda
10th Tour of Flanders
2016
1st Overall Auensteiner–Radsporttage

1st Stage 2b

1st Overall Giro della Toscana

1st Points classification
1st Prologue & Stage 2

2nd Overall The Women's Tour
2nd Crescent Vårgårda UCI Women's WorldTour TTT
2nd Giro dell'Emilia Internazionale Donne Elite
3rd Team time trial, UCI Road World Championships
3rd Overall Emakumeen Euskal Bira
3rd Holland Hills Classic
4th Overall Festival Luxembourgeois du Elsy Jacobs
5th SwissEver GP Cham-Hagendorn
6th Overall Thüringen Rundfahrt der Frauen
8th Pajot Hills Classic
10th Road race, Olympic Games
2017
National Road Championships

1st Time trial
3rd Road race

1st Overall Emakumeen Euskal Bira

1st Points classification
1st Mountains classification
1st Stage 5

1st Overall Giro della Toscana

1st Points classification
1st Mountains classification
1st Stage 2

1st La Classique Morbihan
1st Grand Prix de Plumelec-Morbihan
1st 947 Cycle Challenge
2nd Crescent Vårgårda UCI Women's WorldTour TTT
3rd UCI Road World Championships – Women's team time trial
3rd Overall Setmana Ciclista Valenciana
3rd Overall Grand Prix Elsy Jacobs

1st Prologue

6th La Flèche Wallonne
6th Liège–Bastogne–Liège
7th UCI Road World Championships – Women's time trial
7th Overall The Women's Tour
9th Amstel Gold Race
10th Trofeo Alfredo Binda
2018
1st La Classique Morbihan
1st Grand Prix de Plumelec-Morbihan
2nd Overall Setmana Ciclista Valenciana

1st Mountains classification

2nd Overall Giro Rosa
2nd La Flèche Wallonne
3rd La Course by Le Tour de France
3rd Team time trial, Open de Suède Vårgårda
3rd Team time trial, Tour of Norway
4th Tour of Flanders
4th Liège–Bastogne–Liège
6th Overall Emakumeen Euskal Bira
6th Dwars door Vlaanderen
7th Gent–Wevelgem
8th Overall Festival Elsy Jacobs
8th Strade Bianche
8th GP de Plouay – Bretagne
2019
1st Time trial, African Games
National Road Championships

1st Road race
4th Time trial

1st Emakumeen Nafarroako Klasikoa
1st Taiwan KOM Challenge
3rd Overall Setmana Ciclista Valenciana
3rd Overall Tour of California
4th Overall Giro Rosa
4th Cadel Evans Great Ocean Road Race
5th La Course by Le Tour de France
6th Strade Bianche
6th Clasica Femenina Navarra
7th La Flèche Wallonne
8th Road race, UCI Road World Championships
2020
1st UCI Cycling Esports World Championships
National Road Championships

1st Time trial
1st Road race

6th Overall Giro Rosa
6th Durango-Durango Emakumeen Saria
6th La Flèche Wallonne
2021
2nd Overall Giro Rosa

1st Stage 9

2nd Overall Tour of Norway
4th Emakumeen Nafarroako Klasikoa
7th Liège–Bastogne–Liège
7th Brabantse Pijl
8th Time trial, Summer Olympics
8th Overall Vuelta a Burgos
9th Amstel Gold Race
9th GP de Plouay
2022
1st Overall Tour de Romandie

1st Stage 2

3rd Strade Bianche
4th UCI Esports World Championships
4th La Flèche Wallonne
4th Liège–Bastogne–Liège
4th Durango-Durango Emakumeen Saria
5th Overall The Women's Tour
7th Amstel Gold Race
8th Brabantse Pijl
10th Trofeo Alfredo Binda
2023
1st Durango-Durango Emakumeen Saria
2nd Overall Setmana Ciclista Valenciana

1st Stage 3

2nd CIC-Tour Féminin International des Pyrénées

1st Points classification
1st Stage 1

3rd Overall Vuelta a Burgos Feminas
6th La Flèche Wallonne Féminine
6th Overall Tour de France Femmes
8th Amstel Gold Race
10th Dwars door Vlaanderen

=== General classification results timeline ===
Grand Tour
Grand Tour	2010	2011	2012	2013	2014	2015	2016	2017	2018	2019	2020	2021	2022	2023
Giro d'Italia Femminile	17	13	10	8	13	4	—	DNF	2	4	6	2	—	—
Tour de France Femmes	Did not exist												DNF	6
La Vuelta Femenina	Did not exist													—
Stage race
Stage race	2010	2011	2012	2013	2014	2015	2016	2017	2018	2019	2020	2021	2022	2023
Grand Prix Elsy Jacobs	—	—	11	18	17	7	4	3	8	—	NH	—	—	—
Tour Féminin des Pyrénées	Did not exist												—	2
Vuelta a Burgos Feminas	Did not exist									—	NH	8	—	3
Tour of California	Did not exist					—	—	—	—	3	Not held			
Emakumeen Euskal Bira	11	6	DNF	DNF	4	2	3	1	6	—	Not held			
The Women's Tour	Did not exist				23	—	2	7	—	DNF	NH	—	5	NH
Giro della Toscana Int. Femminile	—	DNF	—	—	—	—	1	1	—	—	NH	—	—	

Legend
—	Did not compete
DNF	Did not finish
IP	In progress
NH	Not held
