= Alba Teruel Ribes =

Spanish cyclist

Alba Teruel
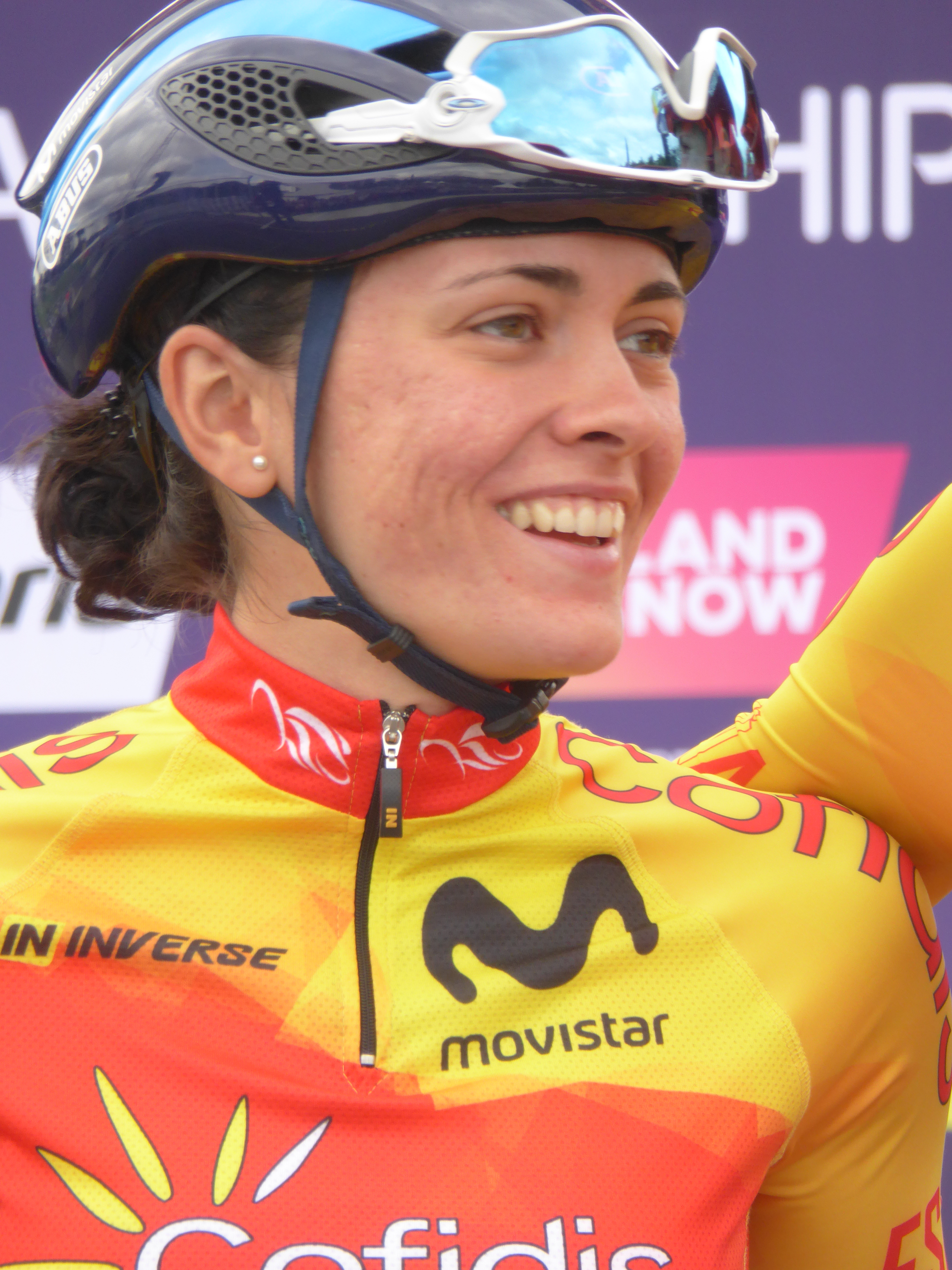
- Teruel at the 2018 European Road Cycling Championships.

Personal information
- Full name: Alba Teruel Ribes
- Born: 17 August 1996 (age 30) Benigànim, Spain
- Height: 1.64 m (5 ft 5 in)
- Weight: 56 kg (123 lb)

Cycling career
- Sport: Cycling
- Current team: Laboral Kutxa–Fundación Euskadi
- Disciplines: Road; Cyclo-cross
- Role: Rider

Professional teams
- 2015–2017: Lointek
- 2018–2021: Movistar Team
- 2022: Bizkaia–Durango
- 2023–: Laboral Kutxa–Fundación Euskadi

Alba Teruel Ribes (born 17 August 1996) is a Spanish professional racing cyclist, who currently rides for UCI Women's Continental Team Laboral Kutxa–Fundación Euskadi.

== Major results ==
2013
2nd Road race, National Junior Road Championships
2015
8th Overall Vuelta a Burgos Feminas
2017
1st Overall Volta Ciclista Valencia Feminas

1st Points classification
1st Young rider classification
1st Stage 1

9th Overall Vuelta a Burgos Feminas
10th Madrid Challenge by La Vuelta
2018
4th Grand Prix de Dottignies
2020
10th Le Samyn des Dames
2023
4th Egmont Cycling Race
8th Grand Prix International d'Isbergues
2024
3rd Grand Prix International d'Isbergues
