= Cristina Martínez (cyclist) =

Spanish cyclist

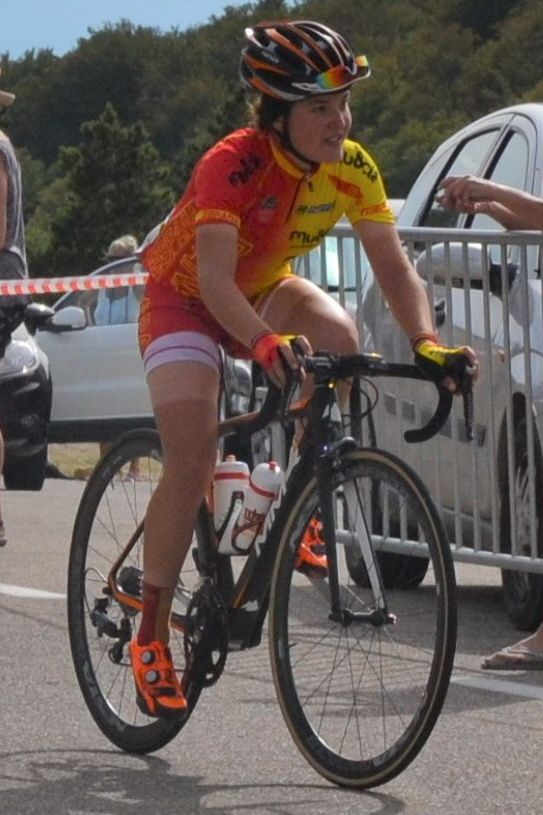
- Martínez in 2016.

Personal information
- Full name: Cristina Martínez Bonafé
- Born: 2 January 1996 (age 30) Torrent, Spain

Cycling career
- Sport: Cycling
- Current team: Aromitalia Vaiano
- Disciplines: Road; Track
- Role: Rider

Amateur teams
- 2013–2014: IVRE–Rustic Levante
- 2020: Casa Dorada Women Cycling

Professional teams
- 2015–2017: Lointek
- 2018–2019: Bizkaia Durango–Euskadi Murias
- 2020: Bizkaia–Durango
- 2021–: Aromitalia–Basso Bikes–Vaiano

Cristina Martínez Bonafé (born 2 January 1996) is a Spanish professional racing cyclist, who currently rides for UCI Women's Continental Team Aromitalia Vaiano.

== Major results ==
2014
National Junior Road Championships

1st Road race
2nd Time trial

2015
1st Young rider classification Emakumeen Euskal Bira
5th Overall Vuelta a Burgos Feminas
2016
10th Overall Vuelta a Burgos Feminas
2017
1st Valencian rider classification Setmana Ciclista Valenciana
2nd Scratch, Trofeu Internacional Ciutat de Barcelona
2019
10th Overall Emakumeen Euskal Bira

== See also ==
- List of 2015 UCI Women's Teams and riders
