= 2014 Emakumeen Euskal Bira =

Race details
- Dates: 12–15 June 2014
- Stages: 4
- Distance: 408.1 km (253.6 mi)

The 2014 Emakumeen Euskal Bira was the 27th edition of the Emakumeen Bira, a women's cycling stage race in Spain. It was held from 12 to 15 June 2014 and was raced over four stages. It was rated by the UCI as category 2.1 event. French rider Pauline Ferrand-Prévot won the overall classification, as well as two stages.

== Stages ==
=== Stage 1 ===
12 June 2013 – Iurreta to Iurreta, 88 km (54.7 mi)

Stage 1 result

	Rider	Team	Time
1	Pauline Ferrand-Prévot (FRA)	Rabobank-Liv Woman Cycling Team	2h 18' 31"
2	Anna van der Breggen (NED)	Rabobank-Liv Woman Cycling Team	s.t.
3	Marianne Vos (NED)	Rabobank-Liv Woman Cycling Team	s.t.
4	Lizzie Armitstead (GBR)	Boels–Dolmans	+ 1' 00"
5	Annemiek van Vleuten (NED)	Rabobank-Liv Woman Cycling Team	+ 1' 00"
6	Rossella Ratto (ITA)	Estado de México–Faren Kuota	+ 1' 00"
7	Claudia Häusler (GER)	Team Giant–Shimano	+ 1' 00"
8	Ashleigh Moolman (RSA)	Hitec Products	+ 1' 00"
9	Fabiana Luperini (ITA)	Estado de México–Faren Kuota	+ 1' 00"
10	Megan Guarnier (USA)	Boels–Dolmans	+ 1' 00"

General Classification after Stage 1

	Rider	Team	Time
1	Pauline Ferrand-Prévot (FRA)	Rabobank-Liv Woman Cycling Team	2h 18' 22"
2	Anna van der Breggen (NED)	Rabobank-Liv Woman Cycling Team	+ 4"
3	Marianne Vos (NED)	Rabobank-Liv Woman Cycling Team	+ 5"
4	Lizzie Armitstead (GBR)	Boels–Dolmans	+ 1' 09"
5	Annemiek van Vleuten (NED)	Rabobank-Liv Woman Cycling Team	+ 1' 09"
6	Rossella Ratto (ITA)	Estado de México–Faren Kuota	+ 1' 09"
7	Claudia Häusler (GER)	Team Giant–Shimano	+ 1' 09"
8	Ashleigh Moolman (RSA)	Hitec Products	+ 1' 09"
9	Fabiana Luperini (ITA)	Estado de México–Faren Kuota	+ 1' 09"
10	Megan Guarnier (USA)	Boels–Dolmans	+ 1' 09"

=== Stage 2 ===
13 June 2013 – Oñati to Oñati, 113.7 km (70.6 mi)

Stage 2 result

	Rider	Team	Time
1	Marianne Vos (NED)	Rabobank-Liv Woman Cycling Team	2h 54' 81"
2	Lizzie Armitstead (GBR)	Boels–Dolmans	+ 22"
3	Emma Johansson (SWE)	Orica–AIS	+ 22"
4	Chantal Blaak (NED)	Specialized–lululemon	+ 22"
5	Pauline Ferrand-Prévot (FRA)	Rabobank-Liv Woman Cycling Team	+ 22"
6	Annemiek van Vleuten (NED)	Rabobank-Liv Woman Cycling Team	+ 22"
7	Ashleigh Moolman (RSA)	Hitec Products	+ 22"
8	Claudia Häusler (GER)	Team Giant–Shimano	+ 22"
9	Lucinda Brand (NED)	Rabobank-Liv Woman Cycling Team	+ 22"
10	Anna van der Breggen (NED)	Rabobank-Liv Woman Cycling Team	+ 22"

General Classification after Stage 2

	Rider	Team	Time
1	Marianne Vos (NED)	Rabobank-Liv Woman Cycling Team	5h 12' 56"
2	Pauline Ferrand-Prévot (FRA)	Rabobank-Liv Woman Cycling Team	+ 24"
3	Anna van der Breggen (NED)	Rabobank-Liv Woman Cycling Team	+ 29"
4	Lizzie Armitstead (GBR)	Boels–Dolmans	+ 1' 31"
5	Annemiek van Vleuten (NED)	Rabobank-Liv Woman Cycling Team	+ 1' 35"
6	Ashleigh Moolman (RSA)	Hitec Products	+ 1' 35"
7	Claudia Häusler (GER)	Team Giant–Shimano	+ 1' 35"
8	Rossella Ratto (ITA)	Estado de México–Faren Kuota	+ 1' 35"
9	Megan Guarnier (US)	Boels–Dolmans	+ 1' 48"
10	Fabiana Luperini (ITA)	Estado de México–Faren Kuota	+ 1' 48"

=== Stage 3 ===
14 June 2013 – Arrieta to Mungia, 91 km (56.5 mi)

Stage 3 result

	Rider	Team	Time
1	Pauline Ferrand-Prévot (FRA)	Rabobank-Liv Woman Cycling Team	2h 32' 47"
2	Marianne Vos (NED)	Rabobank-Liv Woman Cycling Team	+ 1' 42"
3	Emma Johansson (SWE)	Orica–AIS	+ 1' 44"
4	Ashleigh Moolman (RSA)	Hitec Products	+ 1' 44"
5	Megan Guarnier (USA)	Boels–Dolmans	+ 1' 44"
6	Alena Amialiusik (BLR)	Astana BePink	+ 1' 44"
7	Jessie Daams (BEL)	Boels–Dolmans	+ 1' 48"
8	Anna van der Breggen (NED)	Rabobank-Liv Woman Cycling Team	+ 1' 48"
9	Claudia Häusler (GER)	Team Giant–Shimano	+ 1' 48"
10	Fabiana Luperini (ITA)	Estado de México–Faren Kuota	+ 1' 48"

General Classification after Stage 3

	Rider	Team	Time
1	Pauline Ferrand-Prévot (FRA)	Rabobank-Liv Woman Cycling Team	7h 48' 58"
2	Marianne Vos (NED)	Rabobank-Liv Woman Cycling Team	+ 1' 23"
3	Anna van der Breggen (NED)	Rabobank-Liv Woman Cycling Team	+ 2' 00"
4	Ashleigh Moolman (RSA)	Hitec Products	+ 3' 03"
5	Claudia Häusler (GER)	Team Giant–Shimano	+ 3' 08"
6	Megan Guarnier (US)	Boels–Dolmans	+ 3' 17"
7	Fabiana Luperini (ITA)	Estado de México–Faren Kuota	+ 3' 21"
8	Rossella Ratto (ITA)	Estado de México–Faren Kuota	+ 3' 29"
9	Emma Johansson (SWE)	Orica–AIS	+ 4' 09"
10	Trixi Worrack (GER)	Specialized–lululemon	+ 4' 51"

=== Stage 4 ===
15 June 2013 – Ataun to Ataun, 115.4 km (71.7 mi)

Stage 4 result

	Rider	Team	Time
1	Marianne Vos (NED)	Rabobank-Liv Woman Cycling Team	3h 02' 12"
2	Anna van der Breggen (NED)	Rabobank-Liv Woman Cycling Team	+ 5"
3	Emma Johansson (SWE)	Orica–AIS	+ 5"
4	Pauline Ferrand-Prévot (FRA)	Rabobank-Liv Woman Cycling Team	+ 5"
5	Megan Guarnier (USA)	Boels–Dolmans	+ 28"
6	Claudia Häusler (GER)	Team Giant–Shimano	+ 28"
7	Ashleigh Moolman (RSA)	Hitec Products	+ 28"
8	Jessie Daams (BEL)	Boels–Dolmans	+ 28"
9	Fabiana Luperini (ITA)	Estado de México–Faren Kuota	+ 31"
10	Lisa Brennauer (GER)	Specialized–lululemon	+ 1' 08"

Final General Classification

	Rider	Team	Time
1	Pauline Ferrand-Prévot (FRA)	Rabobank-Liv Woman Cycling Team	10h 48' 15"
2	Marianne Vos (NED)	Rabobank-Liv Woman Cycling Team	+ 1' 12"
3	Anna van der Breggen (NED)	Rabobank-Liv Woman Cycling Team	+ 1' 56"
4	Ashleigh Moolman (RSA)	Hitec Products	+ 3' 26"
5	Claudia Häusler (GER)	Team Giant–Shimano	+ 3' 31"
6	Megan Guarnier (US)	Boels–Dolmans	+ 3' 40"
7	Fabiana Luperini (ITA)	Estado de México–Faren Kuota	+ 3' 47"
8	Emma Johansson (SWE)	Orica–AIS	+ 4' 07"
9	Jessie Daams (BEL)	Boels–Dolmans	+ 5' 31"
10	Shara Gillow (AUS)	Orica–AIS	+ 6' 59"

== Classification progress ==
Stage	Winner	General classification	Points classification	Youth classification	Mountains classification	Team classification
1	Pauline Ferrand-Prévot	Pauline Ferrand-Prévot	Pauline Ferrand-Prévot	Ksenyia Tuhai	Anna van der Breggen	Rabobank-Liv Woman Cycling Team
2	Marianne Vos	Marianne Vos	Marianne Vos	Eider Merino	Anna van der Breggen	Rabobank-Liv Woman Cycling Team
3	Pauline Ferrand-Prévot	Pauline Ferrand-Prévot	Pauline Ferrand-Prévot	Eider Merino	Anna van der Breggen	Rabobank-Liv Woman Cycling Team
4	Marianne Vos	Pauline Ferrand-Prévot	Marianne Vos	Eider Merino	Anna van der Breggen	Rabobank-Liv Woman Cycling Team
Final		Pauline Ferrand-Prévot	Marianne Vos	Eider Merino	Anna van der Breggen	Rabobank-Liv Woman Cycling Team

== See also ==
- 2014 in women's road cycling
