= Isabel Ferreres =

Spanish cyclist

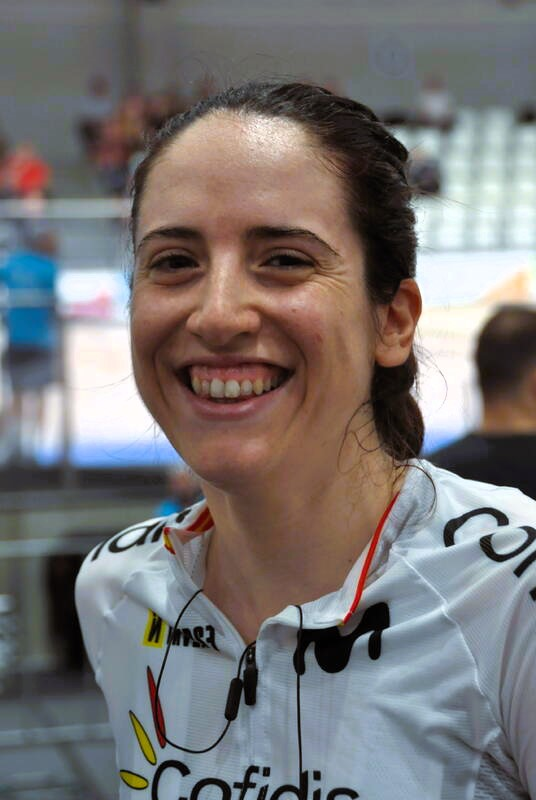
- Ferreres in 2025

Personal information
- Full name: Isabel Ferreres Navarro
- Born: 8 October 1998 (age 28)

Cycling career
- Sport: Cycling
- Discipline: Road
- Role: Rider

Amateur team
- 2018: Hyundai Koryo Car

Professional team
- 2018–2020: Sopela Women's Team

Isabel Ferreres Navarro (born 8 October 1998) is a Spanish professional racing cyclist, who most recently rode for UCI Women's Continental Team Sopela Women's Team.
