= Igor Merino =

Spanish cyclist

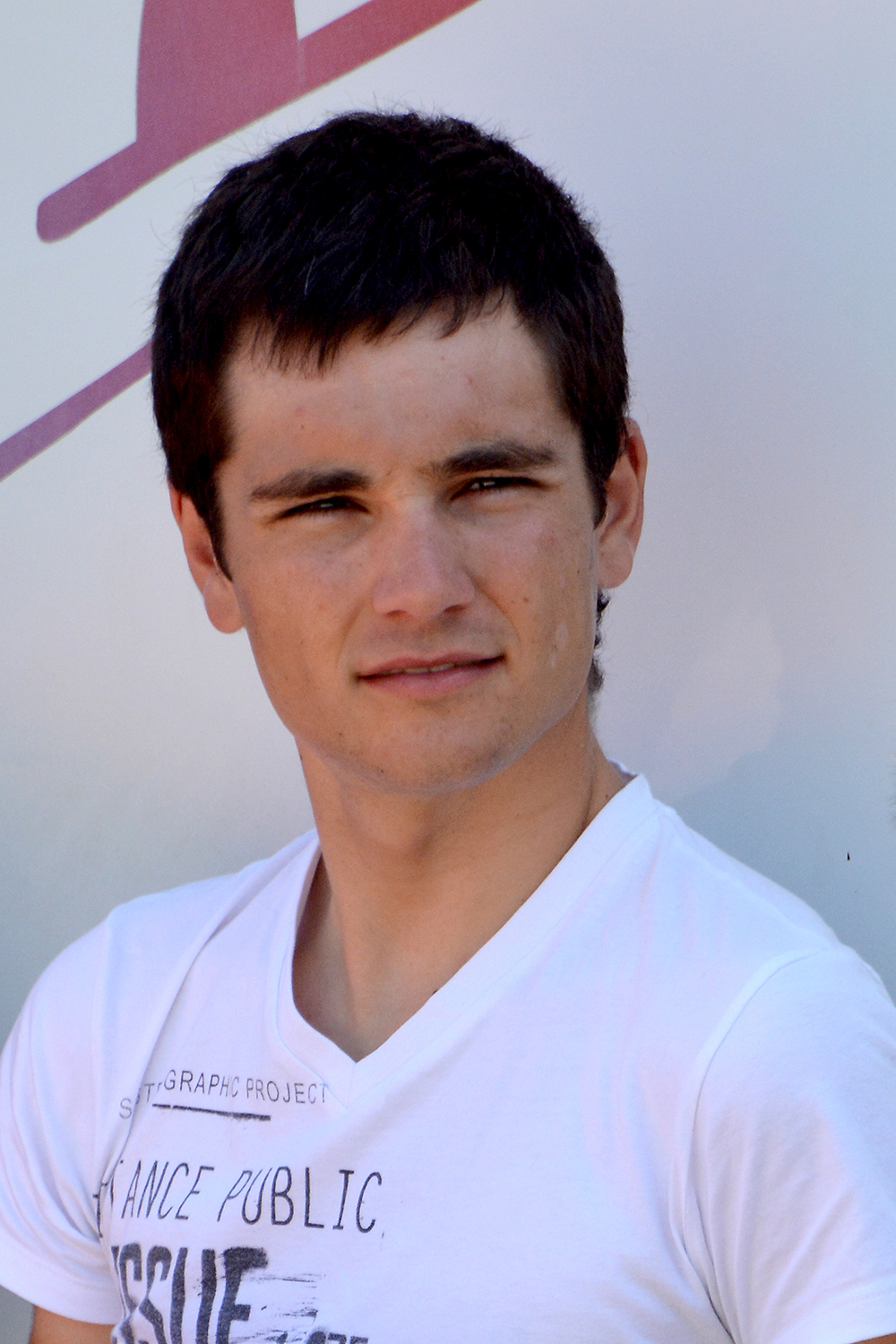

Personal information
- Full name: Igor Merino Cortazar
- Born: 16 October 1990 (age 36) Balmaseda, Spain

Cycling career
- Sport: Cycling
- Current team: Suspended
- Discipline: Road
- Role: Rider
- Rider type: Climber

Professional teams
- 2012–2013: Orbea
- 2014–2018: Burgos BH

Igor Merino Cortazar (born 16 October 1990) is a Spanish cyclist, who is currently suspended from the sport after a positive drugs test for human growth hormone (HGH).

His younger sister Eider is also a professional cyclist.

== Doping suspension ==
In July 2018, Merino was provisionally suspended by the UCI after testing positive to human growth hormone in an out of competition doping test on 13 June 2018. He was suspended for four years, lasting until June 2022.

== Major results ==
2017
4th Tour du Jura
