= 2018 Emakumeen Euskal Bira =

2018 UCI Women's World Tour, race 12 of 24

Race details
- Dates: 19–22 May 2018
- Stages: 4

The 31st running of the Emakumeen Euskal Bira was held from 19 to 22 May 2018. Raced over four stages in the Basque Country, it was one of two women's cycling events at World Tour level in Spain, together with La Madrid Challenge. It was the 12th event of the 2018 UCI Women's World Tour.

== Schedule ==
List of stages
Stage	Date	Course	Distance	Type	Winner
1	19 May	Legazpi to Legazpi	108 km (67.1 mi)	Hilly stage	Sabrina Stultiens (NED)
2	20 May	Agurain to Vitoria-Gasteiz	26.6 km (16.5 mi)	Individual time trial	Annemiek van Vleuten (NED)
3	21 May	Aretxabaleta to Aretxabaleta	114.5 km (71.1 mi)	Hilly stage	Amy Pieters (NED)
3	22 May	Iurreta to Iurreta	120 km (74.6 mi)	Hilly stage	Amanda Spratt (AUS)
Total			369.1 km (229.3 mi)		

== Leadership classification ==
Stage	Winner	General classification	Points classification	Mountains classification	Sprints classification	Young rider classification	Basque rider classification	Team classification
1	Sabrina Stultiens	Sabrina Stultiens	Sabrina Stultiens	Małgorzata Jasińska	Katarzyna Pawłowska	Nadia Quagliotto	Ane Santesteban	WaowDeals
2	Annemiek van Vleuten	Annemiek van Vleuten	Lisa Brennauer	Małgorzata Jasińska	Katarzyna Pawłowska	Aafke Soet	Eider Merino	Mitchelton-Scott
3	Amy Pieters	Annemiek van Vleuten	Lisa Brennauer	Asja Paladin	Katarzyna Pawłowska	Mariia Novolodskaia	Ane Santesteban	Mitchelton-Scott
4	Amanda Spratt	Amanda Spratt	Anna van der Breggen	Asja Paladin	Katarzyna Pawłowska	Aafke Soet	Ane Santesteban	Mitchelton-Scott
Final classification		Amanda Spratt	Anna van der Breggen	Asja Paladin	Katarzyna Pawłowska	Aafke Soet	Ane Santesteban	Mitchelton–Scott

== See also ==
- 2018 in women's road cycling
