= 2022 Tour de Romandie Féminin =

2022 UCI Women's World Tour, race 23 of 23

Race details
- Dates: 7–9 October 2022
- Stages: 3
- Distance: 386.5 km (240.2 mi)
- Winning time: 10h 48' 51"

Results
Jersey awarded to the overall winner	Winner	Ashleigh Moolman-Pasio (RSA)	(SD Worx)
	Second	Annemiek van Vleuten (NED)	(Movistar Team)
	Third	Elisa Longo Borghini (ITA)	(Trek–Segafredo)
Jersey awarded to the points classification winner	Points	Soraya Paladin (ITA)	(Canyon//SRAM)
Jersey awarded to the mountains classification winner	Mountains	Elise Uijen (NED)	(Team DSM)
Jersey awarded to the youth classification winner	Youth	Liane Lippert (GER)	(Team DSM)
	Team	SD Worx	

The 2022 Tour de Romandie Féminin is a women's road cycling stage race that was held in Switzerland from 7 to 9 October 2022. It was the first edition of the Tour de Romandie Féminin and was the twenty-third event on the 2022 UCI Women's World Tour calendar. The race was held as part of the celebrations of 75 years of the Tour de Romandie.

== Teams ==
11 of 14 UCI Women's WorldTeams, three UCI Women's Continental Teams and the Swiss national team made up the fifteen teams that participated in the race.

UCI Women's WorldTeams

- UAE Team ADQ
- Canyon//SRAM
- EF Education–Tibco–SVB
- FDJ Suez Futuroscope
- Liv Racing Xstra
- Movistar Team
- Roland Cogeas Edelweiss Squad
- SD Worx
- Team BikeExchange–Jayco
- Team DSM
- Trek–Segafredo

UCI Women's Continental Teams

- Ceratizit–WNT Pro Cycling
- Parkhotel Valkenburg
- Plantur–Pura
- Valcar–Travel & Service

National Teams

- Switzerland

== Route ==
The first stage was a circuit race in Lausanne, the second stage was from Sion to the ski resort of Thyon 2000 and the final stage was from Fribourg to Geneva - where the first men's Tour de Romandie ended in 1947.

Stage characteristics and winners
Stage	Date	Course	Distance	Type	Winner
1	7 October	Lausanne to Lausanne	134.4 km (83.5 mi)	Hilly stage	Arlenis Sierra (CUB)
2	8 October	Sion to Thyon 2000	104.5 km (64.9 mi)	Mountain stage	Ashleigh Moolman-Pasio (RSA)
3	9 October	Fribourg to Geneva	147.6 km (91.7 mi)	Hilly stage	Marta Lach (POL)
Total		386.5 km (240.2 mi)			

== Stages ==
=== Stage 1 ===
7 October 2022 — Lausanne to Lausanne, 134.4 km (83.5 mi)

Stage 1 Result
Rank	Rider	Team	Time
1	Arlenis Sierra (CUB)	Movistar Team	3h 46' 49"
2	Liane Lippert (GER)	Team DSM	+ 0"
3	Demi Vollering (NED)	SD Worx	+ 0"
4	Soraya Paladin (ITA)	Canyon//SRAM	+ 0"
5	Elisa Longo Borghini (ITA)	Trek–Segafredo	+ 0"
6	Elise Chabbey (SUI)	Canyon//SRAM	+ 0"
7	Yara Kastelijn (NED)	Plantur–Pura	+ 0"
8	Cecilie Ludwig (DEN)	FDJ Suez Futuroscope	+ 0"
9	Ellen van Dijk (NED)	Trek–Segafredo	+ 0"
10	Évita Muzic (FRA)	FDJ Suez Futuroscope	+ 0"

General classification after Stage 1
Rank	Rider	Team	Time
1	Arlenis Sierra (CUB)	Movistar Team	3h 46' 39"
2	Liane Lippert (GER)	Team DSM	+ 4"
3	Demi Vollering (NED)	SD Worx	+ 6"
4	Soraya Paladin (ITA)	Canyon//SRAM	+ 10"
5	Elisa Longo Borghini (ITA)	Trek–Segafredo	+ 10"
6	Elise Chabbey (SUI)	Canyon//SRAM	+ 10"
7	Yara Kastelijn (NED)	Plantur–Pura	+ 10"
8	Cecilie Ludwig (DEN)	FDJ Suez Futuroscope	+ 10"
9	Ellen van Dijk (NED)	Trek–Segafredo	+ 10"
10	Évita Muzic (FRA)	FDJ Suez Futuroscope	+ 10"

=== Stage 2 ===
8 October 2022 — Sion to Thyon 2000, 104.5 km (64.9 mi)

Stage 2 Result
Rank	Rider	Team	Time
1	Ashleigh Moolman-Pasio (RSA)	SD Worx	3h 23' 35"
2	Annemiek van Vleuten (NED)	Movistar Team	+ 26"
3	Elisa Longo Borghini (ITA)	Trek–Segafredo	+ 43"
4	Liane Lippert (GER)	Team DSM	+ 1' 01"
5	Petra Stiasny (SUI)	Roland Cogeas Edelweiss Squad	+ 1' 03"
6	Veronica Ewers (USA)	EF Education–Tibco–SVB	+ 1' 26"
7	Évita Muzic (FRA)	FDJ Suez Futuroscope	+ 1' 41"
8	Yara Kastelijn (NED)	Plantur–Pura	+ 2' 11"
9	Amanda Spratt (AUS)	Team BikeExchange–Jayco	+ 3' 01"
10	Juliette Labous (FRA)	Team DSM	+ 4' 00"

General classification after Stage 2
Rank	Rider	Team	Time
1	Ashleigh Moolman-Pasio (RSA)	SD Worx	7h 00' 14"
2	Annemiek van Vleuten (NED)	Movistar Team	+ 30"
3	Elisa Longo Borghini (ITA)	Trek–Segafredo	+ 49"
4	Liane Lippert (GER)	Team DSM	+ 1' 05"
5	Veronica Ewers (USA)	EF Education–Tibco–SVB	+ 1' 36"
6	Évita Muzic (FRA)	FDJ Suez Futuroscope	+ 1' 51"
7	Yara Kastelijn (NED)	Plantur–Pura	+ 2' 21"
8	Amanda Spratt (AUS)	Team BikeExchange–Jayco	+ 3' 11"
9	Juliette Labous (FRA)	Team DSM	+ 4' 10"
10	Anna Shackley (GBR)	SD Worx	+ 4' 51"

=== Stage 3 ===
9 October 2022 — Fribourg to Geneva, 147.6 km (91.7 mi)

Stage 3 Result
Rank	Rider	Team	Time
1	Marta Lach (POL)	Ceratizit–WNT Pro Cycling	3h 48' 37"
2	Tamara Dronova	Roland Cogeas Edelweiss Squad	+ 0"
3	Arlenis Sierra (CUB)	Movistar Team	+ 0"
4	Nina Kessler (NED)	Team BikeExchange–Jayco	+ 0"
5	Soraya Paladin (ITA)	Canyon//SRAM	+ 0"
6	Marie Le Net (FRA)	FDJ Suez Futuroscope	+ 0"
7	Ellen van Dijk (NED)	Trek–Segafredo	+ 0"
8	Marlen Reusser (SUI)	SD Worx	+ 0"
9	Demi Vollering (NED)	SD Worx	+ 0"
10	Marthe Truyen (BEL)	Plantur–Pura	+ 0"

General classification after Stage 3
Rank	Rider	Team	Time
1	Ashleigh Moolman-Pasio (RSA)	SD Worx	10h 48' 51"
2	Annemiek van Vleuten (NED)	Movistar Team	+ 30"
3	Elisa Longo Borghini (ITA)	Trek–Segafredo	+ 49"
4	Liane Lippert (GER)	Team DSM	+ 1' 05"
5	Veronica Ewers (USA)	EF Education–Tibco–SVB	+ 1' 36"
6	Évita Muzic (FRA)	FDJ Suez Futuroscope	+ 1' 51"
7	Yara Kastelijn (NED)	Plantur–Pura	+ 2' 21"
8	Amanda Spratt (AUS)	Team BikeExchange–Jayco	+ 3' 11"
9	Juliette Labous (FRA)	Team DSM	+ 4' 10"
10	Anna Shackley (GBR)	SD Worx	+ 4' 51"

== See also ==
- 2022 in women's road cycling
