= 2017 Giro della Toscana Int. Femminile – Memorial Michela Fanini =

Race details
- Dates: 8–10 September 2016
- Stages: 2 + Prologue

Results
Jersey awarded to the overall winner	Winner	Ashleigh Moolman (RSA)	(Cervélo–Bigla Pro Cycling)
	Second	Cecilie Uttrup Ludwig (DEN)	(Cervélo–Bigla Pro Cycling)
	Third	Ewelina Szybiak (POL)	
Jersey awarded to the points classification winner	Points	Ashleigh Moolman (RSA)	(Cervélo–Bigla Pro Cycling)
Jersey awarded to the mountains classification winner	Mountains	Ashleigh Moolman (RSA)	(Cervélo–Bigla Pro Cycling)
Jersey awarded to the youth classification winner	Youth	Cecilie Uttrup Ludwig (DEN)	(Cervélo–Bigla Pro Cycling)
Jersey awarded to the sprints classification winner	Sprints	Elisa Balsamo (ITA)	(Valcar–PBM Mixed team)

The 2017 Giro della Toscana Int. Femminile – Memorial Michela Fanini will be the 23rd edition of the Giro della Toscana Int. Femminile – Memorial Michela Fanini, a women's cycling stage race in Italy. It was rated by the UCI as a category 2.2 race.

== Stages ==
List of stages
Stage	Date	Course	Distance	Type	Winner
P	8 September	Campi Bisenzio to Campi Bisenzio	2.2 km (1.4 mi)	Prologue	Lisa Klein (GER)
1	9 September	Segromigno in Piano to Segromigno in Piano	133.6 km (83.0 mi)	Flat stage	Janneke Ensing (NED)
2	10 September	Lucca to Capannori	121.8 km (75.7 mi)	Flat stage	Ashleigh Moolman (RSA)
Total			338.8 km (210.5 mi)		

== Classification leadership ==
Stage	Winner	General classification	Points classification	Mountains classification	Sprints classification	Youth classification
P	Lisa Klein	Lisa Klein	Lisa Klein	Not awarded	Not awarded	Lisa Klein
1	Janneke Ensing	Janneke Ensing	Janneke Ensing	Janneke Ensing	Elisa Balsamo	Cecilie Uttrup Ludwig
2	Ashleigh Moolman	Ashleigh Moolman	Ashleigh Moolman	Ashleigh Moolman	Elisa Balsamo	Cecilie Uttrup Ludwig
Final Classification		Ashleigh Moolman	Ashleigh Moolman	Ashleigh Moolman	Elisa Balsamo	Cecilie Uttrup Ludwig

== See also ==
- 2017 in women's road cycling
