= Cycling at the 2018 Mediterranean Games – Women's individual road race =

Women's cycling road race at the 2018 Mediterranean Games
- Venue: Vila-seca Urban Circuit; 88 km (54.7 mi)
- Date: 27 June
- Competitors: 29 from 10 nations
- Winning time: 2:35:29

Medalists
gold medal	Elisa Longo Borghini	Italy
silver medal	Ane Santesteban	Spain
bronze medal	Erica Magnaldi	Italy

The women's road race was one of 4 cycling events of the 2018 Mediterranean Games in Tarragona. The race started and finished on 27 June at the Vila-seca Urban Circuit and was won by Elisa Longo Borghini of Italy.

== Start list ==
The following NOCs had entered riders to compete in the road race event.

NOC	Number	Athletes
Croatia	1	Maja Perinović
Cyprus	1	Antri Christoforou
Greece	2	Varvara Fasoi; Argyro Milaki
Italy	6	Maria Giulia Confalonieri; Elisa Longo Borghini; Sofia Bertizzolo; Elena Cecchini; Asja Paladin; Erica Magnaldi
Morocco	1	Fatima Zahra El Hayani
Portugal	3	Daniela Reis; Maria Martins; Soraia Silva
Serbia	1	Jelena Erić
Slovenia	2	Špela Kern; Urška Žigart
Spain	6	Alicia González; Sheyla Gutiérrez; Sara Martín; Sofia Rodríguez; Ane Santesteban; Eider Merino
Turkey	6	Ayşe Çakır; Cansu Çelebi; Esin Yılmaz; Fatma Sezer; Kübra Bektaş; Beyza Kahveci

== Results ==
In the table below, "s.t." indicates that the rider crossed the finish line in the same group as the cyclist before him, and was therefore credited with the same finishing time. Under UCI regulations for one-day road races (article 2.3.039), "Any rider finishing in a time exceeding that of the winner by more than 8% shall not be placed".

Final results
Rank	Rider	Time
1st place, gold medalist(s)	Elisa Longo Borghini (ITA)	2h 35' 29"
2nd place, silver medalist(s)	Ane Santesteban (ESP)	+ 3' 18"
3rd place, bronze medalist(s)	Erica Magnaldi (ITA)	s.t.
4	Daniela Reis (POR)	+ 4' 20"
5	Alicia González (ESP)	+ 4' 31"
6	Špela Kern (SLO)	s.t.
7	Urška Žigart (SLO)	+ 4' 39"
8	Eider Merino (ESP)	+ 4' 49"
9	Elena Cecchini (ITA)	+ 7' 53"
10	Maria Giulia Confalonieri (ITA)	s.t.
11	Sheyla Gutiérrez (ESP)	s.t.
12	Jelena Erić (SRB)	s.t.
13	Sofia Bertizzolo (ITA)	+ 7' 55"
14	Asja Paladin (ITA)	+ 8' 17"
15	Sara Martín (ESP)	+ 12' 16"
Over time limit
–	Maja Perinović (CRO)	+ 17' 11"
–	Varvara Fasoi (GRE)	s.t.
–	Sofia Rodríguez (ESP)	s.t.
–	Maria Martins (POR)	+ 24' 34"
–	Fatma Sezer (TUR)	+ 27' 04"
–	Argyro Milaki (GRE)	+ 28' 06"
–	Soraia Silva (POR)	+ 28' 08"
–	Esin Yılmaz (TUR)	+ 36' 25"
–	Kübra Bektaş (TUR)	+ 38' 52"
–	Cansu Çelebi (TUR)	s.t.
–	Ayşe Çakır (TUR)	+ 48' 24"

Abandoned during the stage
–	Antri Christoforou (CYP)	ABN
–	Fatima Zahra El Hayani (MAR)	ABN
–	Beyza Kahveci (TUR)	ABN
