= Sopela Women's Team =

Spanish cycling team

Team information
- UCI code: LTK (2009–2017); SWT (2018–)
- Registered: Spain
- Founded: 2009
- Disciplines: Road and track
- Status: UCI Women's Team (2009–2019); UCI Women's Continental Team (2020–present)
- Bicycles: MMR
- Website: Team home page

Team name history
- 2009–2017 2018–: Lointek; Sopela Women's Team

Sopela Women's Team (UCI team code: SWT) is a professional cycling team based in Spain, which competes in elite road bicycle racing and track cycling events such as the UCI Women's World Tour and elite women's races.

== Team history ==
On 7 October 2014, Fanny Riberot signed a contract extension. On 13 November, Evelyn García signed for the team. On 20 November the team signed a number of contract extensions with; Aurore Verhoeven, Mélodie Lesueur Sheyla Gutiérrez, Lucía González, Belen Lopez and Alicia González. On 24 November Soline Lamboley signed with the team. On 23 December Cristina Martínez signed for the team.

In February 2023, the team's rider, Estela Dominguez, was killed in a collision with a lorry at Villares de la Reina at the age of 19, while training at the beginning of her first year as a professional.

== Team roster ==
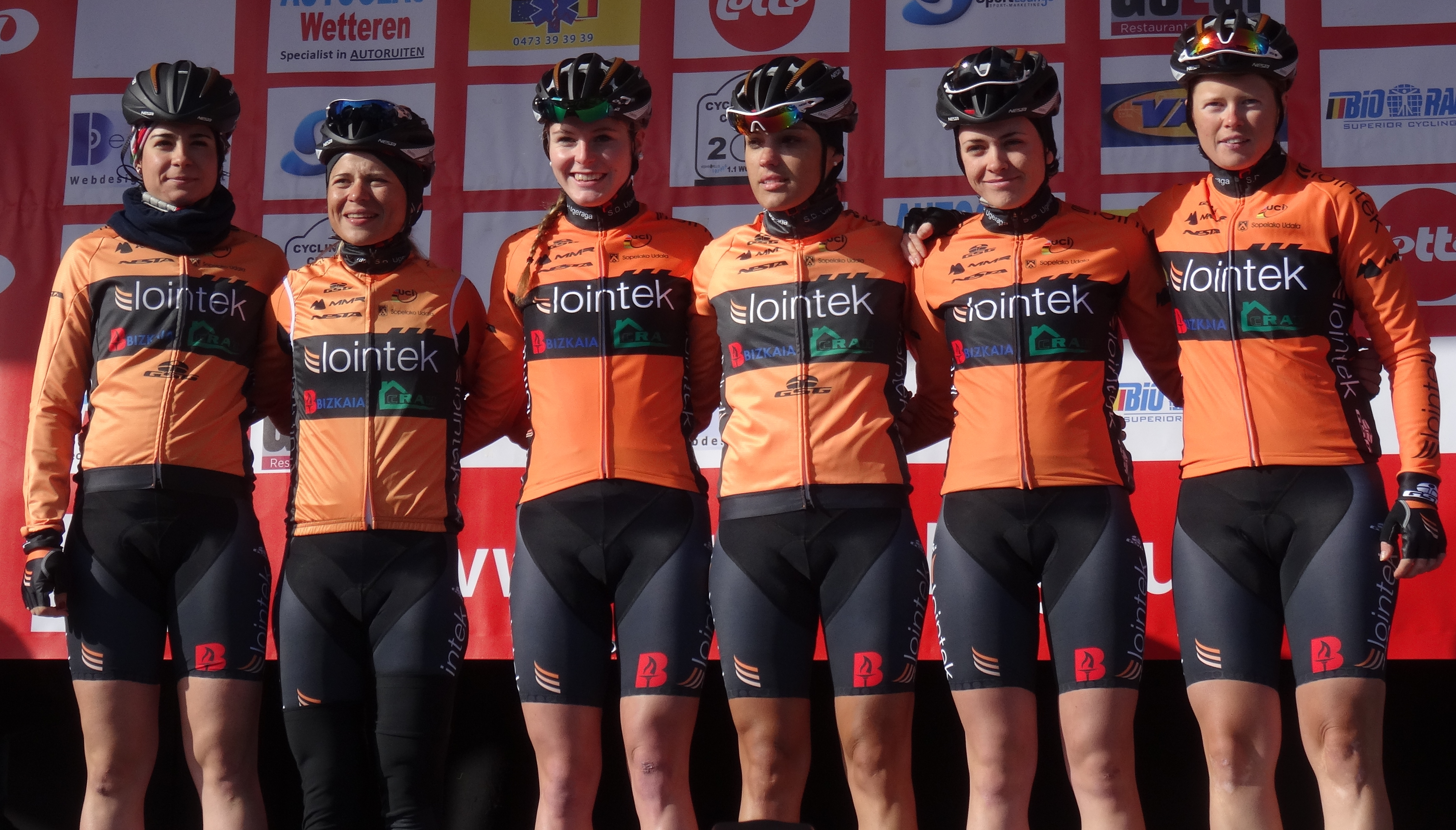
The team at the 2015 Le Samyn des Dames

As of 1 July 2023.

Rider	Date of birth
Naia Amondarain (ESP)	13 February 2001 (age 25)
María Banlles (ESP)	15 September 2000 (age 26)
Cristina Barrajon (ESP)	2 January 1991 (age 35)
Alice Coutinho (FRA)	13 September 2000 (age 26)
Naroa Fernandez (ESP)	28 August 2003 (age 23)
Isabel Ferreres (ESP)	8 October 1998 (age 27)
Lur Florido (ESP)	20 June 2003 (age 23)

Rider	Date of birth
Agnieta Francke (NED)	7 February 1990 (age 36)
Nadine Gill (GER)	19 April 1991 (age 35)
Beatriz Lalaguana (ESP)	2 March 1980 (age 46)
Patricia Ortega (ESP)	15 September 1988 (age 38)
Irantzu Solaguren (ESP)	28 December 2003 (age 22)
Claire Steels (GBR)	9 November 1986 (age 39)

== Major results ==
2009
Overall Semaine Cantalienne, Fanny Riberot

Stage 2, Fanny Riberot

Trophée Fémina, Fanny Riberot
Ambierle, Fanny Riberot
Lyon Gerland, Fanny Riberot
Gruffy, Fanny Riberot

2010
Overall Semaine Cantalienne, Fanny Riberot

Stages 1 & 5, Fanny Riberot

Gran Premio San Isidro, Fanny Riberot
Prix des Fondateurs, Fanny Riberot

2011
Road Race Championship of the Basque Country, Eneritz Iturriaga
Grenoble Technisud, Fanny Riberot
Overall Semaine Cantalienne, Fanny Riberot

2012
Road Race Championship of Andalusia, Belén López
Zalla Road Race, Fanny Riberot
Road Race Championship of Provence-Alpes-Côte d'Azur, Fanny Riberot
Charentonnay, Fanny Riberot
Trofeo Gobierno de La Rioja, Yulia Ilinykh
Campeonato de Euskadi, Yulia Ilinykh
Iurreta Road Race, Yulia Ilinykh

2013
Balmaseda Road Race, Eider Merino Cortazar
Campeonato de Navarra, Fanny Riberot

2014
Youth classification Emakumeen Euskal Bira, Eider Merino Cortazar
Bembibre Copa de España, Eider Merino Cortazar
Urnieta (Campeonato de Euskadi), Alicia González Blanco
2015
Overall Vuelta a Burgos Feminas, Belén López

Stage 1 (ITT), Belén López

Grand Prix de Plumelec-Morbihan Dames, Sheyla Gutiérrez
Cyclo-cross de Karrantza, Lucía González Blanco
Trofeo Ria de Marin, Eider Merino Cortazar
Balmaseda, Eider Merino Cortazar

2016
Trofeo Roldan (Copa de España), Gloria Rodríguez

2017
Busturia (Torneo Euskaldun), Alicia González Blanco
Valencian rider classification Setmana Ciclista Valenciana, Cristina Martínez
Overall Vuelta a Burgos, Eider Merino Cortazar

Stage 1, Eider Merino Cortazar

Bergara (Torneo Euskaldun), Eider Merino Cortazar
Berriatua (Torneo Euskaldun), Eider Merino Cortazar
Sarriguren (Torneo Euskaldun), Alicia González Blanco
Larrabasterra (Torneo Euskaldun), Gloria Rodríguez
Overall Volta Ciclista Valencia Feminas, Alba Teruel Ribes

Points classification, Alba Teruel Ribes
Mountains classification, Gloria Rodríguez
Sprints classification, Alicia González Blanco
Youth classification, Alba Teruel Ribes
Team classification
Stage 1, Alba Teruel Ribes
Stage 2, Eider Merino
Stage 3, Cristina Martínez

Trofeo Roldan (Copa de España), Alicia González Blanco
Time Trial Championship of Murcia, Gloria Rodríguez

2018
Overall Vuelta a Burgos Feminas, Beatriu Gómez

Stage 1, Ziortza Isasi
Stage 3, Ariadna Trias

Circuito Jose Marquez, Soraia Silva
Palmela, Maria Martins
Vila Nova de Tazem Time Trial, Maria Martins

== National champions ==
2009
Spain Time Trial, Débora Gálvez Lopez
2010
Spain U23 Cyclo-cross, Lucia González Blanco
2011
Spain Time Trial, Eneritz Iturriaga Etxebarria
2012
Spain Junior Mountainbike (XC), Lucia González
Spain Track, (Team Pursuit), Irene Usabiaga
Spain Track, (Points race), Irene Usabiaga
Spain Track, (Scratch race), María del Mar Bonnin
2013
Spain Cyclo-cross, Lucia González
2015
El Salvador Time Trial, Evelyn García
El Salvador Road Race, Evelyn García
European U23 Track (Scratch race), Lucia González
2017
Spain U23 Cyclo-cross, Alicia González
Spain Track, (Points race), Cristina Martinez
Spain Track, (Team Pursuit), Ziortza Isasi Cristobal
2018
Portugal Track, (Points race), Maria Martins
Portugal Track, (Scratch race), Maria Martins
Portugal Track, (Omnium), Maria Martins
2019
Portugal Track, (Omnium), Maria Martins
Portugal Track, (Points race), Maria Martins
Portugal Track, (Scratch race), Maria Martins
Spain U23 Time Trial, Iurani Blanco
