= 2022 Strade Bianche Donne =

Cycling race

2022 UCI Women's World Tour, race 1 of 23
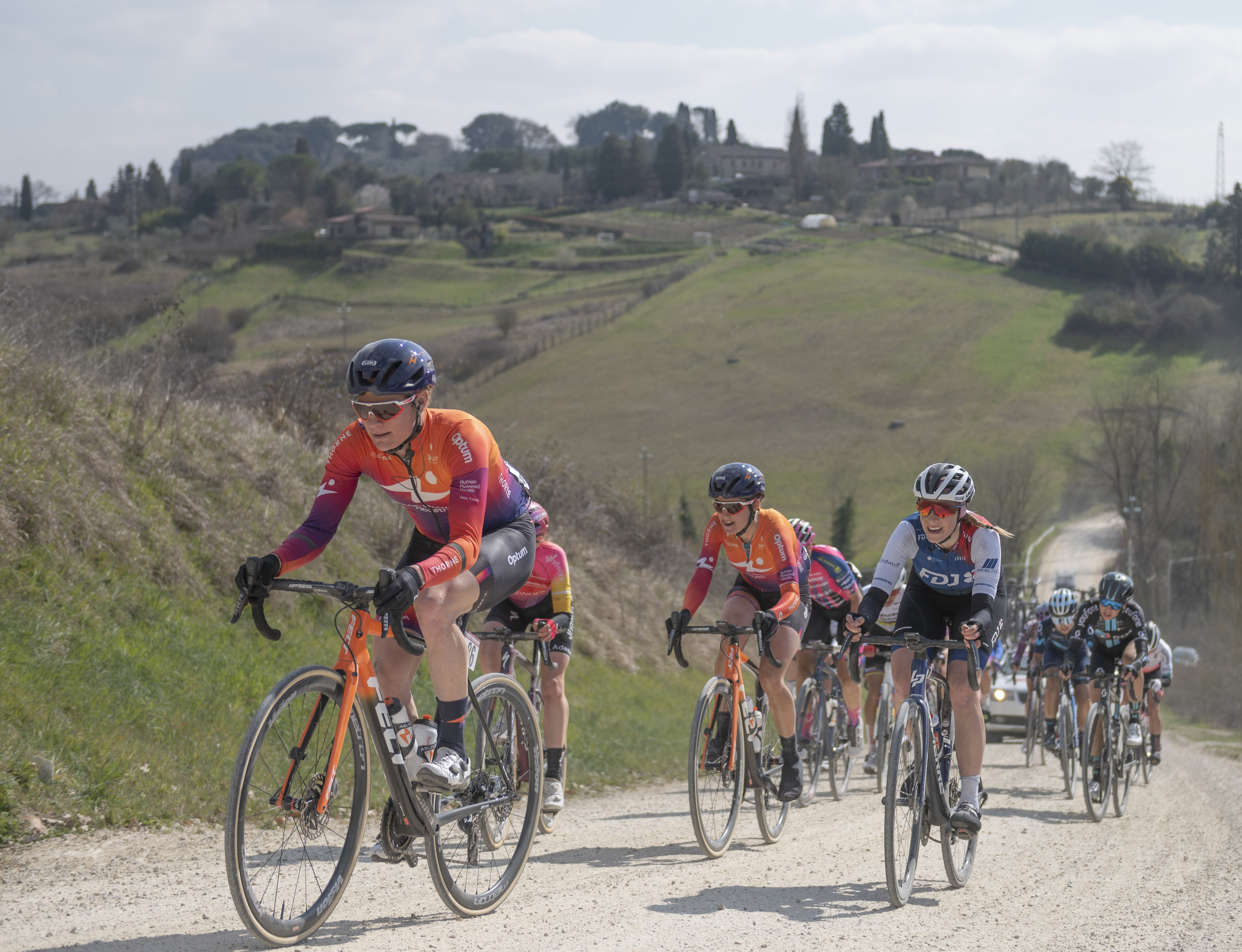

Race details
- Dates: 5 March 2022
- Distance: 136 km (85 mi)
- Winning time: 3h 59' 14"

Results
	Winner	Lotte Kopecky (BEL)	(SD Worx)
	Second	Annemiek van Vleuten (NED)	(Movistar Team)
	Third	Ashleigh Moolman Pasio (SAF)	(SD Worx)

The 2022 Strade Bianche Donne was an Italian road cycling one-day race that took place on 5 March 2022. It was the 8th edition of Strade Bianche Donne and the first event of the 2022 UCI Women's World Tour. The usual first race of the season, the Cadel Evans Great Ocean Road Race in Australia was cancelled due to the COVID-19 pandemic. It was won by the Belgian national champion Lotte Kopecky.

== Route ==
The race starts and finishes in Siena, Italy. The route is identical to that of the previous years, containing 30 km of 'strade bianche' gravel roads spread over eight sectors, for a total distance of 136 km. The final kilometre in Siena to the finish line in the Piazza del Campo has a maximum gradient of 16%.

Sectors of strade bianche
No.	Name	Distance from		Length (km)	Category	Description
No.	Name	Start (km)	Finish (km)	Length (km)	Category	Description
1	Vidritta	17.6	118.4	2.1	*	Perfectly straight and slightly downhill
2	Bagnaia	25	111.0	5.8	*	Short descent followed by a long climb with sections of over 10% gradient
3	Radi	36.9	99.1	4.4	*	A classic gravel section
4	La piana	47.6	88.4	5.5	*	No significant gradient
5	San Martino in Grania	67.5	68.5	9.5	*	A long sector with continuous ups and downs to start with, and ends with a twisting climb
6	Monteaperti	111.3	24.7	0.8	*	Short, but features a double-digit gradient ramp
7	Colle Pinzuto	116.6	19.4	2.4	*	The climb toward Colle Pinzuto, with gradients of up to 15%
8	Le Tolfe	123.6	12.4	1.1	*	A sequence of demanding descents followed by a very punchy climb with a maximum gradient of 18%

== Teams ==
Fourteen UCI Women's WorldTeams and eleven UCI Women's Continental Teams make up the twenty-five teams that will compete in the race.

UCI Women's WorldTeams

- Canyon//SRAM
- EF Education–Tibco–SVB
- FDJ Nouvelle-Aquitaine Futuroscope
- Human Powered Health
- Team Jumbo–Visma
- Liv Racing Xstra
- Movistar Team
- Roland Cogeas Edelweiss Squad
- SD Worx
- Team BikeExchange–Jayco
- Team DSM
- Trek–Segafredo
- UAE Team ADQ
- Uno-X Pro Cycling Team

UCI Women's Continental Teams

- Valcar–Travel & Service
- Ceratizit–WNT Pro Cycling
- Parkhotel Valkenburg
- Plantur–Pura
- Aromitalia–Basso Bikes–Vaiano
- Bepink
- Born to Win G20 Ambedo
- Isolmant–Premac–Vittoria
- Servetto–Makhymo–Beltrami TSA
- Team Mendelspeck
- Top Girls Fassa Bortolo

== Summary ==
After a variety of attacks from riders throughout the strade bianche gravel tracks, a small group of twelve riders made it to the foot of the final climb in Siena - with 3 of those riders belonging to SD Worx. On the final climb on the Via Santa Caterina up to the finish, Lotte Kopecky of SD Worx was the only rider able to keep up with Annemiek van Vleuten of Movistar Team. However, at the top of the climb, Kopecky was able to outsprint van Vleuten for the win. Ashleigh Moolman Pasio of SD Worx was third, 10 seconds behind. After the race, Kopecky lauded the work of her SD Worx teammates.

== Result ==
Result
Rank	Rider	Team	Time
1	Lotte Kopecky (BEL)	SD Worx	3h 59' 14"
2	Annemiek van Vleuten (NED)	Movistar Team	+ 0"
3	Ashleigh Moolman Pasio (SAF)	SD Worx	+ 10"
4	Katarzyna Niewiadoma (POL)	Canyon//SRAM	+ 19"
5	Cecilie Uttrup Ludwig (DEN)	FDJ Nouvelle-Aquitaine Futuroscope	+ 24"
6	Elise Chabbey (SUI)	Canyon//SRAM	+ 28"
7	Marianne Vos (NED)	Team Jumbo–Visma	+ 29"
8	Elisa Longo Borghini (ITA)	Trek–Segafredo	+ 29"
9	Shirin Van Anrooij (NED)	Trek–Segafredo	+ 34"
10	Silvia Persico (ITA)	Valcar–Travel & Service	+ 34"
