= Eider Merino Cortazar =

Spanish cyclist (born 1994)

Eider Merino
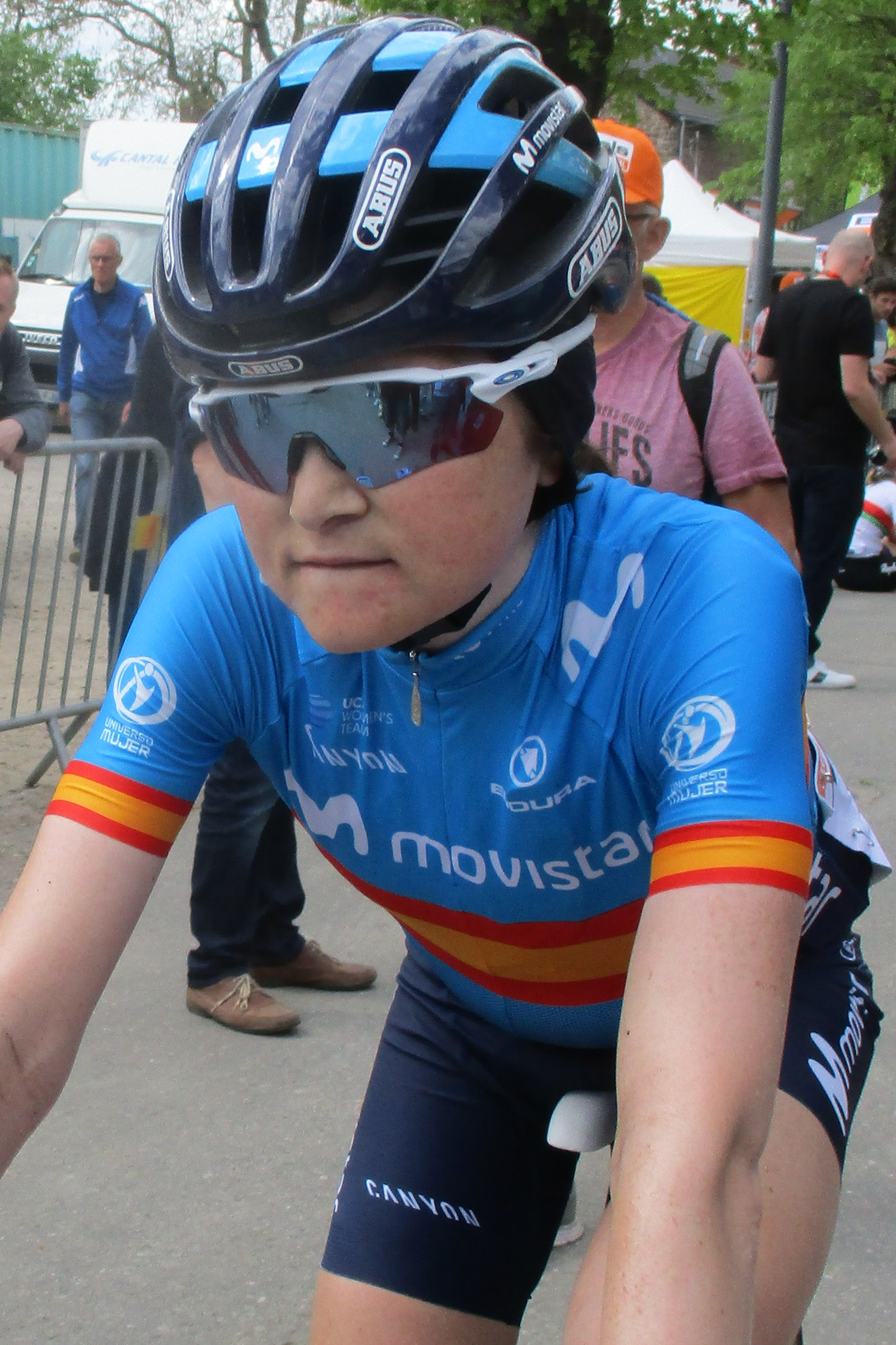
- Merino in 2019

Personal information
- Full name: Eider Merino Cortazar
- Born: 2 August 1994 (age 32) Balmaseda, Basque Country, Spain
- Height: 1.54 m (5 ft 1 in)

Cycling career
- Sport: Cycling
- Discipline: Road
- Role: Rider
- Rider type: Climber

Professional teams
- 2013–2017: Lointek
- 2018–2020: Movistar Team
- 2021: A.R. Monex
- 2022: Le Col–Wahoo
- 2023: Laboral Kutxa–Fundación Euskadi

Major wins
- National Road Race Championships (2018)

Eider Merino Cortazar (born 2 August 1994) is a Spanish professional racing cyclist, who rode for UCI Women's Continental Team Laboral Kutxa–Fundación Euskadi. Prior to joining the Movistar Team in 2018, Merino rode for five years with the Lointek team. Her elder brother Igor Merino is also a professional cyclist, but is currently suspended from the sport.

== Major results ==
2011
10th Road race, UEC European Junior Road Championships
2014
1st Young rider classification Emakumeen Euskal Bira
2015
3rd La Classique Morbihan
4th Overall Vuelta a Burgos Feminas

1st Mountains classification

10th Overall Tour Cycliste Féminin International de l'Ardèche
2016
3rd Overall Vuelta a Burgos Feminas
8th Overall Tour Cycliste Féminin International de l'Ardèche
2017
1st Overall Vuelta a Burgos Feminas

1st Points classification

3rd Durango-Durango Emakumeen Saria
4th Overall Emakumeen Euskal Bira
10th La Classique Morbihan
2018
National Road Championships

1st Road race
2nd Time trial

3rd Overall Tour Cycliste Féminin International de l'Ardèche

1st Stage 4

7th Overall Vuelta a Burgos Feminas

1st Mountains classification

8th Road race, Mediterranean Games
8th Overall Giro Rosa
8th La Classique Morbihan
9th Durango-Durango Emakumeen Saria
2019
3rd Overall Tour Cycliste Féminin International de l'Ardèche
4th Overall Setmana Ciclista Valenciana
5th Emakumeen Nafarroako Klasikoa
9th Overall Emakumeen Euskal Bira
9th La Classique Morbihan
9th Giro dell'Emilia Internazionale Donne Elite
2020
3rd Road race, National Road Championships
8th Emakumeen Nafarroako Klasikoa

== See also ==
- List of 2015 UCI Women's Teams and riders
