= Alicia González Blanco =

Spanish cyclist (born 1995)

Alicia González
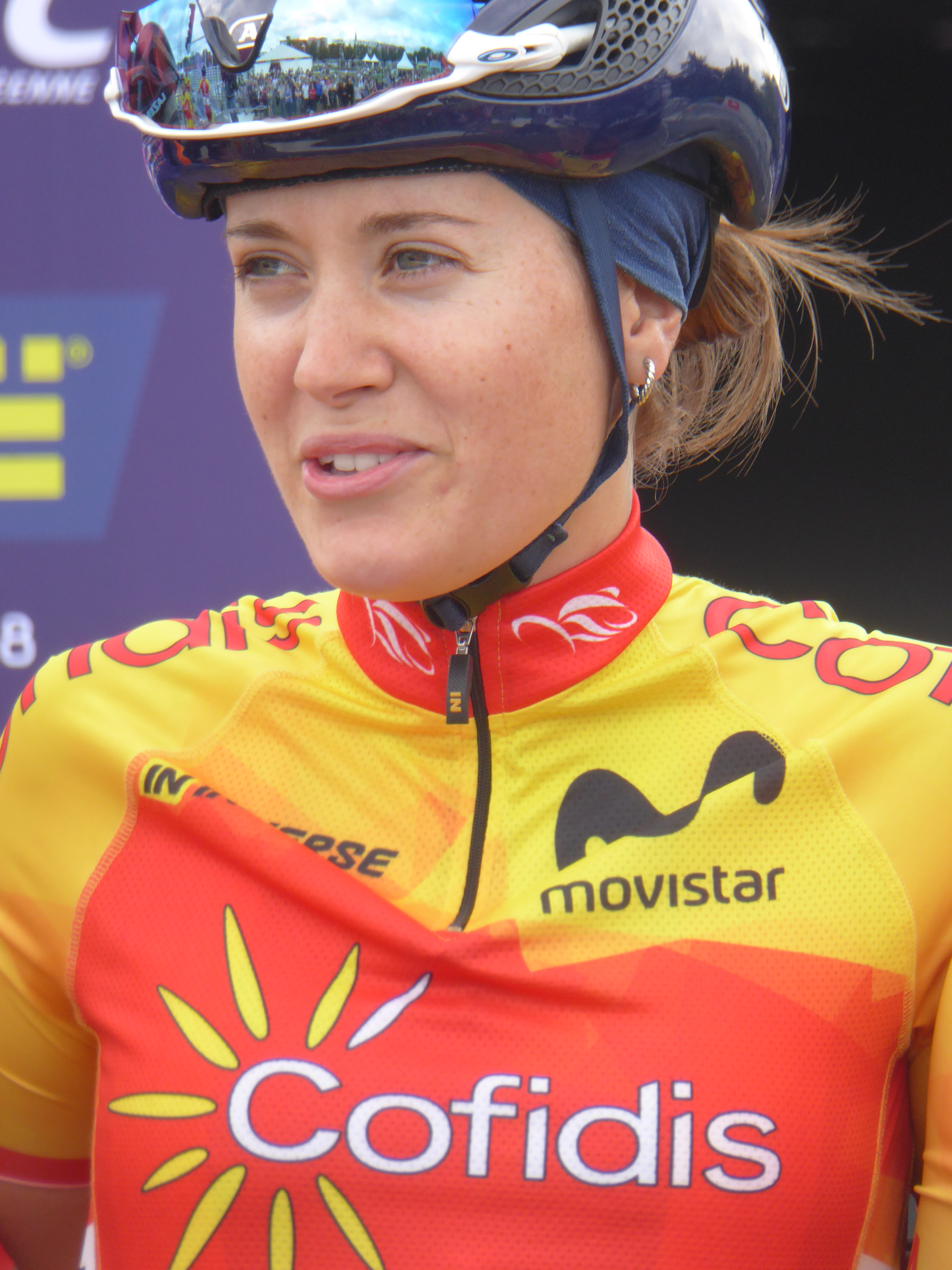
- González at the 2018 European Road Cycling Championships.

Personal information
- Full name: Alicia González Blanco
- Born: 27 May 1995 (age 31) Viella, Asturias, Spain

Cycling career
- Sport: Cycling
- Current team: Movistar Team
- Disciplines: Road; Cyclo-cross
- Role: Rider

Professional teams
- 2013–2017: Lointek
- 2018–2023: Movistar Team
- 2024: Lifeplus Wahoo
- 2025-: St. Michel–Preference Home–Auber93

Alicia González Blanco (born 27 May 1995) is a Spanish professional racing cyclist, who currently rides for UCI Women's WorldTeam St. Michel–Preference Home–Auber93.

== Early life ==
González was born in Viella in 1995. Her father, Carlos González, was sports director of the Viella-Guttrans cycling team, and her sister Lucía González Blanco is also a professional cyclist.

She graduated from the University of Oviedo with a degree in biotechnology.

== Career ==
González signed with the Lointek team in 2014. She finished in third position in the 2015 Spanish Road Championship, and she won the Spanish Cyclo-Cross Championship in 2017. In February 2018, having signed for Movistar Team, she finished in third position at the Setmana Ciclista Valenciana, becoming the first rider in the women's team to earn a podium position. In 2019, she extended her contract with Movistar until the end of 2021. By 2021, she was one of only four riders who had been with Movistar since the team's launch in 2018, and had recorded 21 top-ten results with the team.

In 2025, whilst racing for St. Michel–Preference Home–Auber93, González competed in the Tour de France Femmes for the first time. She competed in a breakaway on one stage, and finished two stages in the Top 15 of the classification.

== Major results ==
2012
10th Road race, UEC European Junior Road Championships
2013
National Road Championships

1st Road race
1st Time trial

2015
3rd Road race, National Road Championships
6th Overall Vuelta a Burgos Feminas
2017
5th Overall Vuelta a Burgos Feminas
7th Road race, UEC European Under-23 Road Championships
2018
3rd Time trial, National Road Championships
3rd Overall Setmana Ciclista Valenciana
3rd La Classique Morbihan
5th Road race, Mediterranean Games
2019
7th Clasica Femenina Navarra
10th Durango-Durango Emakumeen Saria
2020
9th GP de Plouay
2021
10th ReVolta

== See also ==
- List of 2015 UCI Women's Teams and riders
