= Emakumeen Nafarroako Klasikoa =

Race details
- Date: July
- Region: Spain
- Discipline: Road
- Competition: UCI 1.2 (2019); 1.1 (2020–)
- Type: Road Race

History
- First edition: 2019
- Editions: 3 (as of 2021)
- First winner: Ashleigh Moolman-Pasio (RSA)
- Most wins: Annemiek van Vleuten (NED); 2 wins
- Most recent: Annemiek van Vleuten (NED)

The Emakumeen Nafarroako Klasikoa is an annual professional road bicycle race for women in Spain.

== Winners ==
Year	Country	Rider	Team
2019	South Africa	Ashleigh Moolman-Pasio	CCC - Liv
2020	Netherlands	Annemiek van Vleuten	Mitchelton–Scott
2021	Netherlands	Annemiek van Vleuten	Movistar Team
2022	Australia	Sarah Gigante	Movistar Team
