= Gran Premio San Isidro =

Group 1 horse race in Argentina

- Class: Group 1
- Location: Hipódromo de San Isidro

Race information
- Distance: 1600 meters
- Surface: Turf
- Qualification: Three-years-old and up
- Weight: Weight for Age
- Purse: $62,400,000 ARS (2026); 1st: $32,000,000 ARS

The Gran Premio San Isidro - Copa Dr. Melchor Ángel Posse is a Group 1 thoroughbred horse race run at Hipódromo de San Isidro in Buenos Aires, Argentina, open to horses three-years-old and older. It is run over a distance of 1600 metres (0.99 mi) on the turf.

== History ==
The Gran Premio San Isidro has been run as a Group 1 race since 1981. The Gran Premio 25 de Mayo was known as the Premio San Isidro or Gran Premio San Isidro until 1959.

== Records since 1988 ==
Speed record:

- 1:31.17 – Riton (1995)

Greatest winning margin:

- 15 lengths – Riton (1995)

Most wins:

- 2 – Lord Card (1999, 2001)

Most wins by a jockey:

- 3 – Jacinto R. Herrera (1993, 2001, 2004)
- 3 – Cardenas E. Talaverano (1999, 2009, 2012)
- 3 – Pablo Gusavo Falero (2003, 2006, 2011)
- 3 – Pablo Damián Carrizo (2008, 2013, 2017)

Most wins by a trainer:

- 3 – Alfredo F. Gaitán Dassié (1995, 2014, 2022)
- 3 – Ernesto Eusebio Romero (1999, 2001, 2015)
- 3 – Enrique Martín Ferro (2018, 2019, 2023)

Most wins by an owner:

- 2 – Stud Oma Fanny (1999, 2001)
- 2 – Stud Tramo 20 (2017, 2020)

Most wins by a breeder:

- 4 – Haras Firmamento (2011, 2012, 2021, 2022)

== Winners since 1988 ==
Year	Winner	Age	Jockey	Trainer	Owner	Breeder	Time	Margin	Ref
2026	Colifato Novo	5	Iván E. Monasterolo	Joaquín Alberto Cano	Stud El Ranquel	Maximiliano Marcelo Conti	1:34.74	4 lengths	
2025	What a Man	5	Rodrigo D. Bascuñan	Juan Manuel Etchechoury	Haras El Angel de Venecia	Haras La Pasion	1:31.97	3 1/2 lengths	
2024	Earth God	3	Martín Javier Valle	Nicólas Martín Ferro	Stud Grupo 4	Haras Abolengo	1:32.18	3/4 length	
2023	Nanda Dea ƒ	4	Martín Javier Valle	Enrique Martín Ferro	Haras Santa Ines	Haras Santa Ines	1:33.29	1 1/2 lengths	
2022	Bamb Craf	5	Rodrigo G. Blanco	Alfredo F. Gaitán Dassié	Haras Firmamento	Haras Firmamento	1:36.15	2 1/2 lengths	
2021	Holi Rimout	3	Aníbal José Cabrera	Marcelo Blanco	Stud El Chesco Viejo	Haras Firmamento	1:32.19	3 lengths	
2020	Hole in One	6	Juan Cruz Villagra	Gustavo Ernesto Romero	Stud Tramo 20	Haras Santa Maria de Araras	1:34.38	3/4 length	
2019	El Consorte	4	Lautaro E. Balmaceda	Enrique Martín Ferro	Stud Urquiza	Haras La Quebrada	1:38.13	3 lengths	
2018	Nicholas	5	Eduardo Ortega Pavón	Enrique Martín Ferro	Stud Nosotros	Haras El Doguito	1:33.46	1/2 Neck	
2017	Victor Security	5	Pablo Damián Carrizo	Pablo Ezequiel Sahagián	Stud Tramo 20	Haras La Pasion	1:33.30	1/2 length	
2016	El Benicio	3	Juan Cruz Villagra	Pablo Ezequiel Sahagián	Stud Facundito	Haras El Mallin	1:33.69	1 1/2 lengths	
2015	Todo Un Amiguito	7	Jorge Antonio Ricardo	Ernesto Eusebio Romero	Haras y Stud Don Nico	Carlos Alberto Virgini Monayer	1:32.74	2 lengths	
2014	Il Fornaio	3	Eduardo Ortega Pavón	Alfredo F. Gaitán Dassié	Haras Pozo de Luna	Haras Cachagua and Haras Pozo de Luna	1:35.79	1 1/2 lengths	
2013	Don't Worry	4	Pablo Damián Carrizo	René Jesús Ayub	Stud C.A.R.	René Jesus Ayub and Haras Rodeo Chic	1:33.60	1/2 Neck	
2012	Maipo Royale	4	Cardenas E. Talaverano	Gregorio Bernardo Vivas	Stud Castañon	Haras Firmamento	1:31.78	1 length	
2011	Curioso Slam	4	Pablo Gustavo Falero	Pablo Pedro Sahagián	Stud La Pampita	Haras Firmamento	1:33.10	1/2 length	
2010	Rupit	7	Jorge Antonio Ricardo	Julio Francisco Liceri	Stud C.M.N.	Santiago Pablo Dell'acqua and Haras Dell'acqua	1:33.48	1 1/2 lengths	
2009	Maruco Plus	5	Cardenas E. Talaverano	Natalio D. Mezzotero	Stud Los Gauchos	Haras La Gringa	1:32.06	2 lengths	
2008	Inter Optimist	4	Pablo Damián Carrizo	Waldir Libero Zancanaro	Haras y Stud Vengador	Haras y Stud Vengador	1:31.89	3/4 length	
2007	Secretario Plan	4	Francisco Arreguy	Edmundo I. Rodríguez	Haras Capricornio	Haras Capricornio	1:31.94	3/4 length	
2006	Ice Horse	5	Pablo Gustavo Falero	Juan Carlos Maldotti	Stud Bingo Horse	Haras Vacacion	1:32.55	Neck	
2005	Fox Dancer	4	Juan Carlos Noriega	Juan Carlos Maldotti	Stud Identic	José Ignacio Hurtado Vicuna	1:33.37	Head	
2004	Masterpiece	4	Jacinto R. Herrera	Juan Carlos Etchechoury	Stud Matty	Haras La Quebrada	1:33.92	3/4 length	
2003	Question	4	Pablo Gustavo Falero	Juan Carlos Maldotti	Stud Nadina	Haras Vacacion	1:33.75	1 1/2 lengths	
2002	Candy Ride	3	Armando C. Glades	Roberto Daniel López	Stud Ojos Claros	Haras Abolengo	1:32.16	8 lengths	
2001	Lord Card	7	Jacinto R. Herrera	Ernesto Eusebio Romero	Stud Oma Fanny	Jorge Raul Sternberg	1:33.15	1 1/2 lengths	
2000	Big Board	4	Juan Carlos Jarcovsky	Pablo Damián Carrizo	Stud Sueño Possible	Haras Los Cerrillos	1:31.67	1/2 Neck	
1999	Lord Card	5	Cardenas E. Talaverano	Ernesto Eusebio Romero	Stud Oma Fanny	Jorge Raul Sternberg	1:32.55	3 lengths	
1998	Di Escorpion	3	Néstor Nicolás Oviedo	Edmundo I. Rodríguez	Stud Cosa Nostra	Haras La Irenita	1:33.20	3 1/2 lengths	
1997	Sam's	4	Jorge Valdivieso	Carlos D. Etchechoury	Haras Santa Maria de Araras	Haras Santa Maria de Araras	1:33.11	1/2 Head	
1996	Caro Sueño	4	Abel Lujan J. Giorgis	Braulio Ángel Astegiano	Stud Querido Viejo	Luz Achaval de Vedoya and Ricardo Vedoya	1:32.83	2 lengths	
1995	Riton	5	Horacio E. Karamanos	Alfredo F. Gaitán Dassié	Haras Rio Claro	Linneo Edouardo de Paula Machado	1:31.17	15 lengths	
1994	Lucky Bucefalo	5	Rubén Emilio Laitán	Juan Carlos Addati	Fervir (LP) Inhabilitada	Juan Carlos Addati	1:37.00	3 lengths	
1993	Cleante	4	Jacinto R. Herrera	Vilmar Sanguinetti	Frank E. Whitham	Haras El Malacate	1:35.40	6 lengths	
1992	Rinconazo	4		Eduardo Oscar Ferro	Haras Rincon de Luna	Haras Rincon de Luna	1:34.00	Neck	
1991	Tibaldi	4	Guillermo E. Sena	Juan Alberto Maldotti	Stud La Esclava	Haras Income	1:33.83		
1990	Halcon Guapo	4	Julio C. Garcia	Mario A. Catapano	Stud Los Halcones		1:32.60		
1989*	Runner Boy	5	Claudio M. Pintos		Stud Kalahari	Roberto Oscar Laffont	1:32.80	3 lengths	
1989*	Ultrasonido	4	Jorge Valdivieso	Luis A. Riviello	Stud Don Henry	Haras El Turf	1:32.80	3 lengths	
1988	Pan de Lujo	5	Rubén Emilio Laitán		Stud Tessa		1:33.80		

ƒ indicates a filly/mare

*1989 resulted in a dead heat.

== Earlier winners (incomplete) ==
- 1981: Legitimo I
- 1982: Montego
- 1983: Bleding
- 1984: Louvre
- 1985: Fray Pablo
- 1986: Cephis
- 1987: Cautin
