= Iurreta =

Coordinates: 43°10′59″N 2°37′59″W

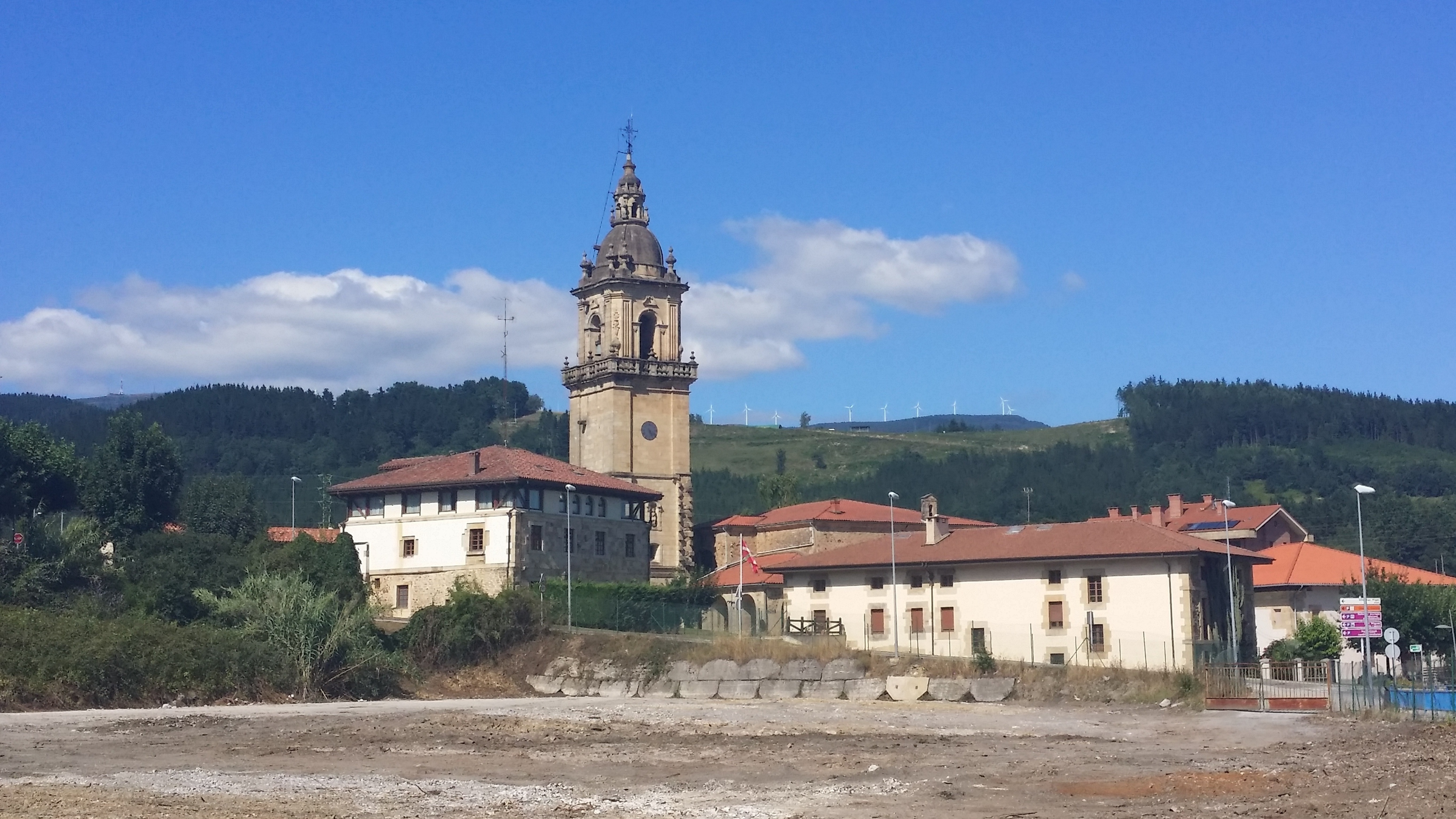
- Partial view of Iurreta

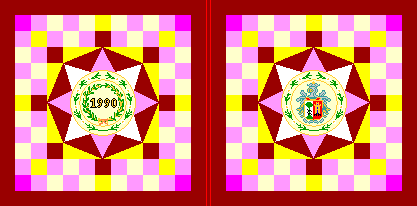
- Flag Coat of arms

- Location in Spain.
- Country: Spain
- Autonomous community: Biscay

Area
  - Total: 18.84 km^{2} (7.27 sq mi)
- Elevation: 112 m (367 ft)

Population (2025-01-01)
  - Total: 3,897
  - Density: 206.8/km^{2} (535.7/sq mi)
- Time zone: UTC+1 (CET)
  - Summer (DST): UTC+2 (CEST)
- Website: www.iurreta.eus

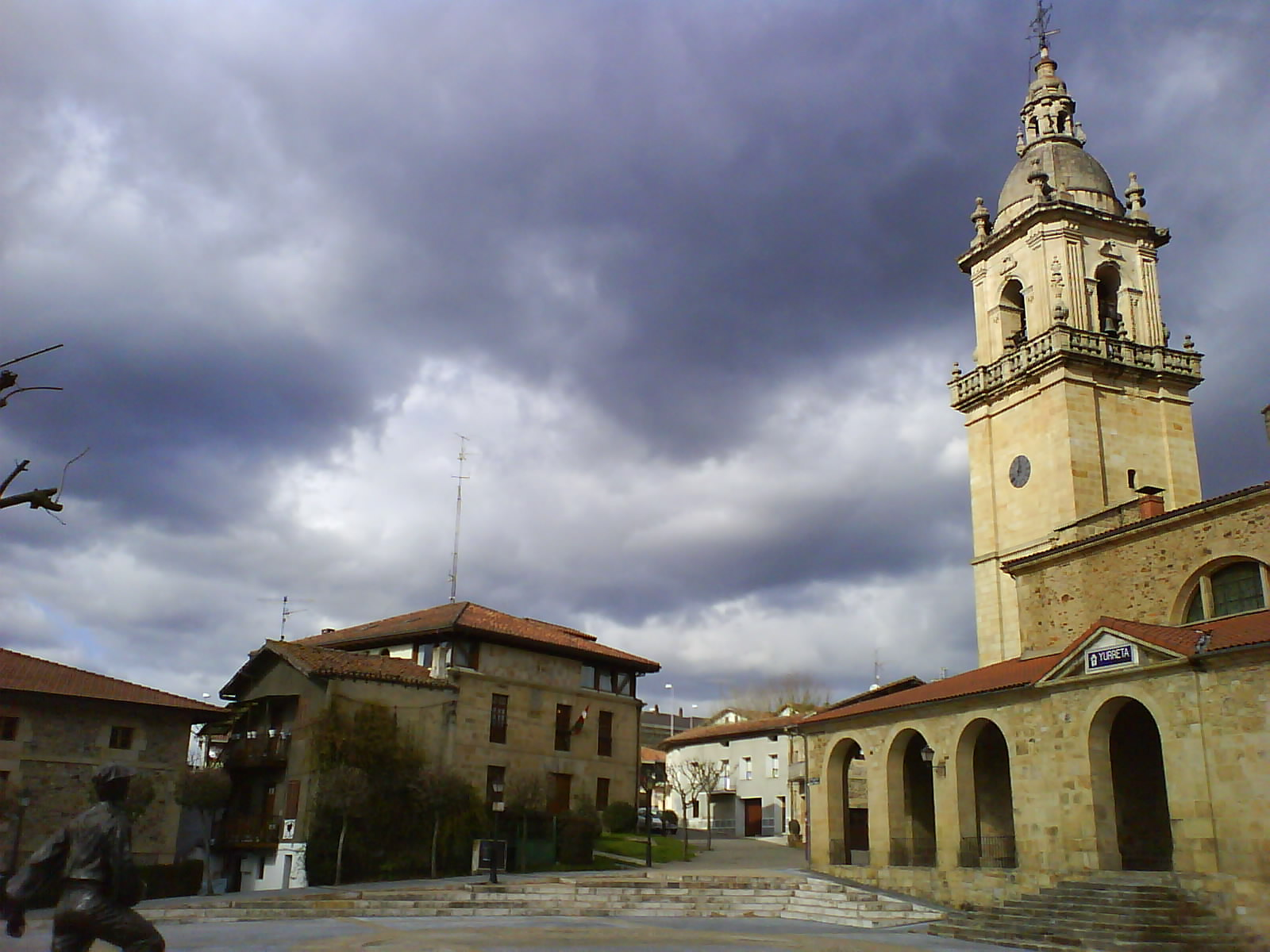
Saint Michael's church and plaza, Iurreta

Iurreta is a town and municipality located in the province of Biscay, in the autonomous community of Basque Autonomous Community, northern Spain. Incorporated into the municipality of Durango in 1926, Iurreta regained its independent status in 1990. The traditional anteiglesia or town meeting system of local government was revived.
