= Vuelta a Burgos Feminas =

Spanish multi-day road cycling race

Race details
- Date: May
- Region: Castile and Leon, Spain
- Discipline: Road
- Competition: National (2015–2018); UCI 2.1 (2019); 2.WWT (2021–)
- Type: Stage race
- Web site: www.vueltaburgos.com/feminas/

History
- First edition: 2015
- Editions: 11 (as of 2026)
- First winner: Belen Lopez (ESP)
- Most wins: Demi Vollering (NED) (2 wins)
- Most recent: Yara Kastelijn (NED)

The Vuelta a Burgos Feminas is a women's cycle stage race in Spain, part of the UCI Women's World Tour. The race is held in the autonomous region of Castile and León in northern Spain, on flat and hilly stages.

== History ==
The Vuelta a Burgos is a longstanding men's race, which was first held in 1946. In 2015, a professional women's race was held as a national event on similar roads to the men's race. In 2021, the race joined the UCI Women's World Tour. In 2025, the race added an individual time trial for the first time.

== Winners ==
Year	Country	Rider	Team
2015	Spain	Belen Lopez	Lointek
2016	Spain	Margarita Victoria Garcia	Bizkaia–Durango
2017	Spain	Eider Merino	Lointek
2018	Spain	Beatriu Gomez	Lointek
2019	Norway	Stine Borgli	Norway (National team)
2020	No race due to COVID-19 pandemic		
2021	Netherlands	Anna van der Breggen	SD Worx
2022	France	Juliette Labous	Team DSM
2023	Netherlands	Demi Vollering	SD Worx
2024	Netherlands	Demi Vollering	Team SD Worx–Protime
2025	Switzerland	Marlen Reusser	Movistar Team
2026	Netherlands	Yara Kastelijn	Fenix–Premier Tech
