= French National Road Race Championships =

National road cycling championship in France

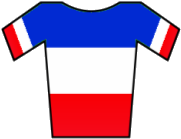
The French tricolor jersey

The French National Road Race Championship is a cycling race where the French cyclists decide who will become the champion for the year to come. The event was established in 1899, a professional championship was established in 1907 and the women's championship was established in 1951. Several additional categories were added later. The record for victories is by one of the best female cyclists, Jeannie Longo, who has so far won 20 road championships.

The winners of each event are awarded with a symbolic cycling jersey which is blue, white and red, just like the national flag, these colours can be worn by the rider at other road racing events in the country to show their status as national champion. The champion's stripes can be combined into a sponsored rider's team kit design for this purpose.

== Men ==
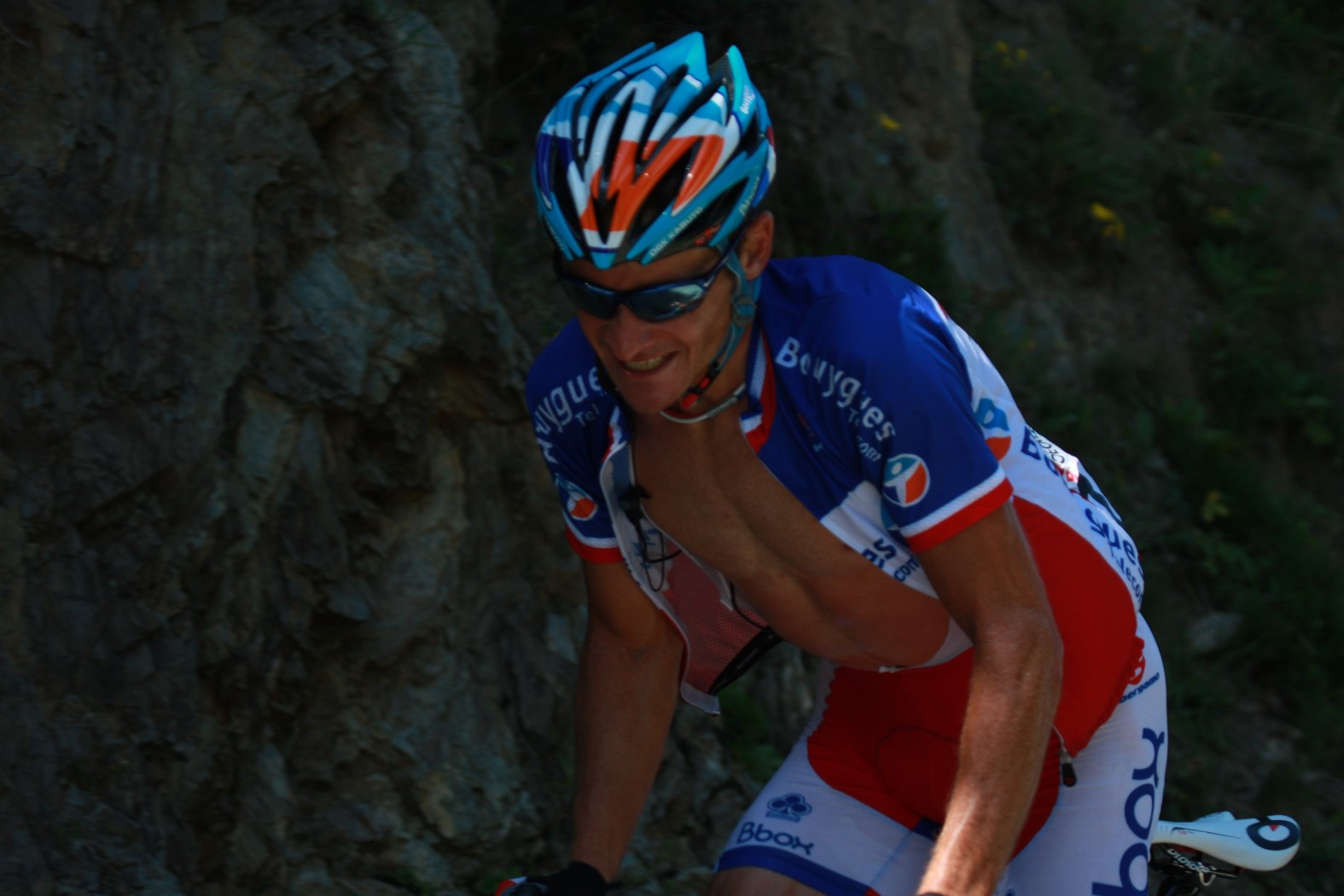
Thomas Voeckler, 2010 men's champion

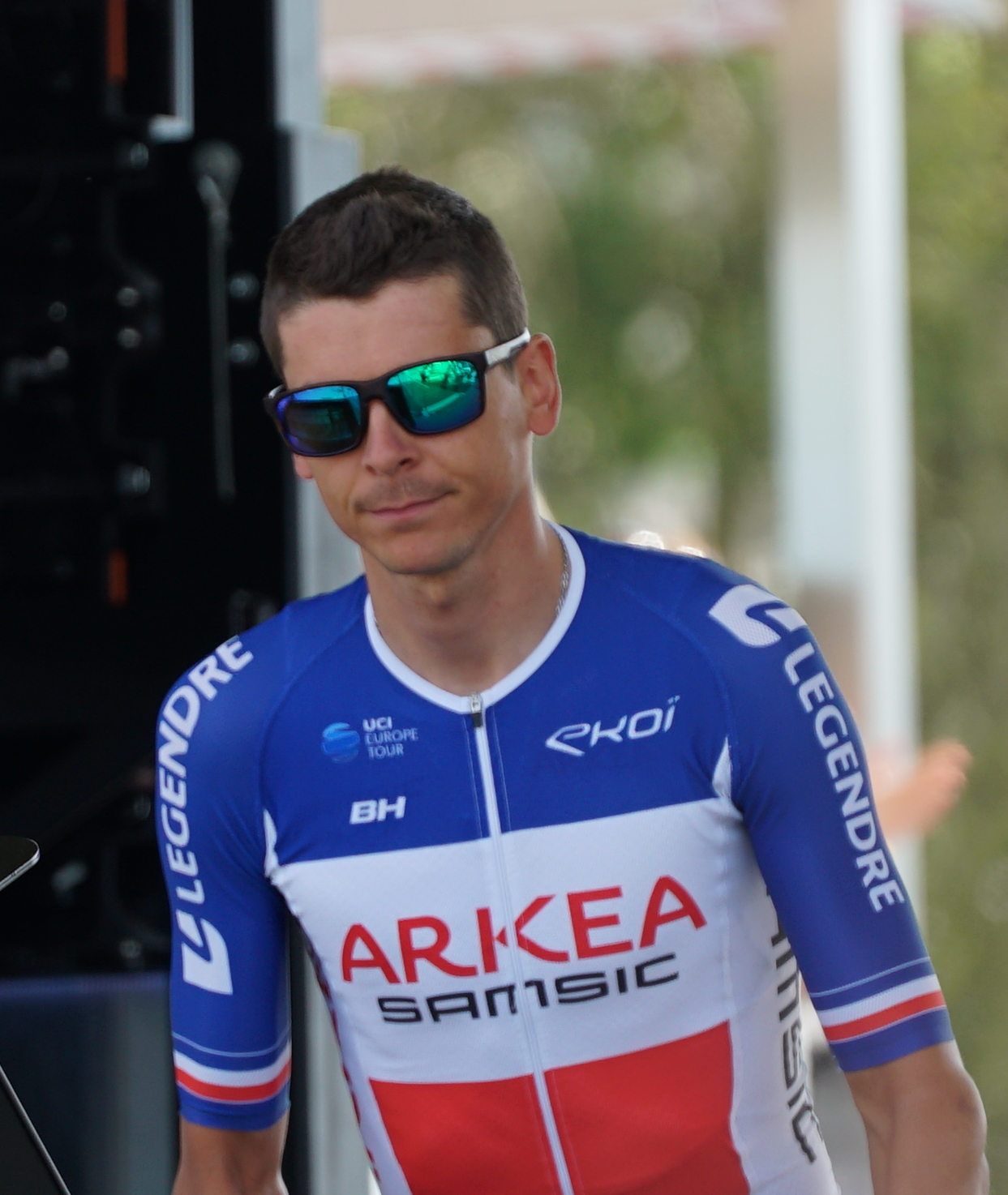
Warren Barguil, 2019 men's champion

Year	Gold	Silver	Bronze
1907	Gustave Garrigou	Henri Lignon	Louis Trousselier
1908	Gustave Garrigou	Louis Trousselier	Maurice Brocco
1909	Jean Alavoine	Henri Lignon	Édouard Léonard
1910	Émile Georget	Maurice Brocco	Lucien Petit-Breton
1911	Octave Lapize	Gustave Garrigou	Jean Alavoine
1912	Octave Lapize	Louis Engel	Charles Charron
1913	Octave Lapize	Maurice Brocco	Charles Crupelandt
1914	Charles Crupelandt	Émile Engel	Maurice Brocco
1915– 1918	Not held due to World War I		
1919	Henri Pélissier	Honoré Barthélémy	Maurice Brocco
1920	Jean Alavoine	Henri Pélissier	Maurice Brocco
1921	Francis Pélissier	Henri Pélissier	Romain Bellenger
1922	Jean Brunier	Marcel Godard	Jean Alavoine
1923	Francis Pélissier	Romain Bellenger	Henri Pélissier
1924	Francis Pélissier	Henri Pélissier	Georges Cuvelier
1925	Achille Souchard	Francis Pélissier	Romain Bellenger
1926	Achille Souchard	Francis Pélissier	Ferdinand Le Drogo
1927	Ferdinand Le Drogo	Charles Pélissier	Maurice Bonney
1928	Ferdinand Le Drogo	André Leducq	André Raynaud
1929	Marcel Bidot	Jean Bidot	André Leducq
1930	Roger Bisseron	Charles Pélissier	Ferdinand Le Drogo
1931	Armand Blanchonnet	Francis Pélissier	André Leducq
1932	André Godinat	Antonin Magne	Benoît Faure
1933	Roger Lapébie	Antonin Magne	Georges Speicher
1934	Raymond Louviot	Antonin Magne	André Godinat
1935	Georges Speicher	René Le Grevès	Jules Merviel
1936	René Le Grevès	Antonin Magne	Louis Thiétard
1937	Georges Speicher	René Le Grevès	Joseph Soffietti
1938	Paul Maye	Sylvain Marcaillou	Marcel Laurent
1939	Georges Speicher	Louis Thiétard	Fabien Galateau
1940	Not held		
1941 (Occupée)	Albert Goutal	Gérard Virol	Lucien Lauk
1941 (Libre)	René Vietto	Dante Gianello	Victor Pernac
1942	Émile Idée	Raymond Louviot	Lucien Le Guével
1943	Paul Maye	Benoît Faure	Lucien Lauk
1944	Urbain Caffi	Lucien Teisseire	Émile Idée
1945	Eloi Tassin	Paul Maye	Joseph Goutorbe
1946	Louis Caput	Joseph Soffietti	Kléber Piot
1947 (Note: Paul Néri finished first in the race but did not qualify as he was an Italian citizen. The race was re-run at a later date.)	Émile Idée	Jean de Gribaldy	Lucien Lauk
1948	César Marcelak	Raymond Louviot	Paul Giguet
1949	Jean Rey	Camille Danguillaume	Attilio Redolfi
1950	Louison Bobet	Antonin Rolland	Émile Idée
1951	Louison Bobet	Pierre Barbotin	Roger Buchonnet
1952	Adolphe Deledda	Jean Baldassari	Bernard Gauthier
1953	Raphaël Géminiani	Antonin Rolland	Louison Bobet
1954	Jacques Dupont	Robert Varnajo	Pierre Molinéris
1955	André Darrigade	Louison Bobet	Louis Caput
1956	Bernard Gauthier	René Privat	Louison Bobet
1957	Valentin Huot	Marcel Rohrbach	Jean Forestier
1958	Valentin Huot	Raphaël Géminiani	François Mahé
1959	Henry Anglade	Jean Forestier	René Privat
1960	Jean Stablinski	Louis Rostollan	André Darrigade
1961	Raymond Poulidor	Jean Stablinski	Guy Ignolin
1962	Jean Stablinski	Marcel Rohrbach	Anatole Novak
1963	Jean Stablinski	Guy Ignolin	Jacques Anquetil
1964	Jean Stablinski	Georges Groussard	André Foucher
1965	Henry Anglade	Raymond Poulidor	Jacques Anquetil
1966	Jean-Claude Theillière	Jean Stablinski	André Foucher
1967	~~Désiré Letort~~	Lucien Aimar	Raymond Riotte
1968	Lucien Aimar	Roger Pingeon	Michel Périn
1969	Raymond Delisle	Maurice Izier	Bernard Guyot
1970	~~Paul Gutty~~	Cyrille Guimard	Christian Raymond
1971	~~Yves Hézard~~	~~Jean Dumont~~	Cyrille Guimard
1972	Roland Berland	Bernard Guyot	Michel Périn
1973	Bernard Thévenet	Régis Ovion	Claude Tollet
1974	Georges Talbourdet	Alain Santy	Bernard Bourreau
1975	Régis Ovion	Alain Santy	Gérard Moneyron
1976	Guy Sibille	Alain Meslet	Jean-Pierre Genet
1977	Marcel Tinazzi	René Bittinger	André Chalmel
1978	Bernard Hinault	Jean-René Bernaudeau	Gilbert Chaumaz
1979	Roland Berland	Bernard Hinault	Mariano Martínez
1980	Pierre-Raymond Villemiane	Bernard Hinault	Raymond Martin
1981	Serge Beucherie	Bernard Vallet	Hubert Linard
1982	Régis Clère	Bernard Vallet	Jacques Michaud
1983	Marc Gomez	Jacques Michaud	Jean-René Bernaudeau
1984	Laurent Fignon	Éric Dall'Armelina	Pascal Jules
1985	Jean-Claude Leclercq	Charly Bérard	Martial Gayant
1986	Yvon Madiot	Jean-Claude Leclercq	Jean-Claude Bagot
1987	Marc Madiot	Luc Leblanc	Martial Gayant
1988	Éric Caritoux	Marc Madiot	Gilbert Duclos-Lassalle
1989	Éric Caritoux	Laurent Bezault	Martial Gayant
1990	Philippe Louviot	Pascal Dubois	Christophe Manin
1991	Armand de Las Cuevas	Thierry Claveyrolat	Gérard Rué
1992	Luc Leblanc	Thierry Marie	Jean-Claude Colotti
1993	Jacky Durand	Laurent Brochard	Francisque Teyssier
1994	Jacky Durand	Frédéric Moncassin	Christophe Capelle
1995	Eddy Seigneur	Jean-Claude Colotti	Laurent Madouas
1996	Stéphane Heulot	Laurent Roux	Frédéric Guesdon
1997	Stéphane Barthe	Damien Nazon	Franck Morelle
1998	Laurent Jalabert	Luc Leblanc	Richard Virenque
1999	François Simon	Pascal Hervé	Cédric Vasseur
2000	Christophe Capelle	Jacky Durand	Anthony Morin
2001	Didier Rous	Walter Bénéteau	Arnaud Prétot
2002	Nicolas Vogondy	Nicolas Jalabert	Patrice Halgand
2003	Didier Rous	Richard Virenque	Patrice Halgand
2004	Thomas Voeckler	Cyril Dessel	Benoît Salmon
2005	Pierrick Fédrigo	Laurent Brochard	Nicolas Jalabert
2006	Florent Brard	Thomas Voeckler	Didier Rous
2007	Christophe Moreau	Pierrick Fédrigo	Patrice Halgand
2008	Nicolas Vogondy	Arnaud Coyot	Julien Loubet
2009	Dimitri Champion	Anthony Geslin	Anthony Roux
2010	Thomas Voeckler	Christophe Le Mével	Mickaël Delage
2011	Sylvain Chavanel	Anthony Roux	Thomas Voeckler
2012	Nacer Bouhanni	Arnaud Démare	Adrien Petit
2013	Arthur Vichot	Sylvain Chavanel	Tony Gallopin
2014	Arnaud Démare	Nacer Bouhanni	Kévin Reza
2015	Steven Tronet	Tony Gallopin	Sylvain Chavanel
2016	Arthur Vichot	Tony Gallopin	Alexis Vuillermoz
2017	Arnaud Démare	Nacer Bouhanni	Jérémy Leveau
2018	Anthony Roux	Anthony Turgis	Julian Alaphilippe
2019	Warren Barguil	Julien Simon	Damien Touzé
2020	Arnaud Démare	Bryan Coquard	Julian Alaphilippe
2021	Rémi Cavagna	Rudy Molard	Damien Touzé
2022	Florian Sénéchal	Anthony Turgis	Axel Zingle
2023	Valentin Madouas	Rudy Molard	Julien Bernard
2024	Paul Lapeira	Julien Bernard	Thomas Gachignard
2025	Dorian Godon	Romain Grégoire	Kévin Vauquelin
2026	Romain Grégoire	Paul Lapeira	Joris Delbove

== Women ==
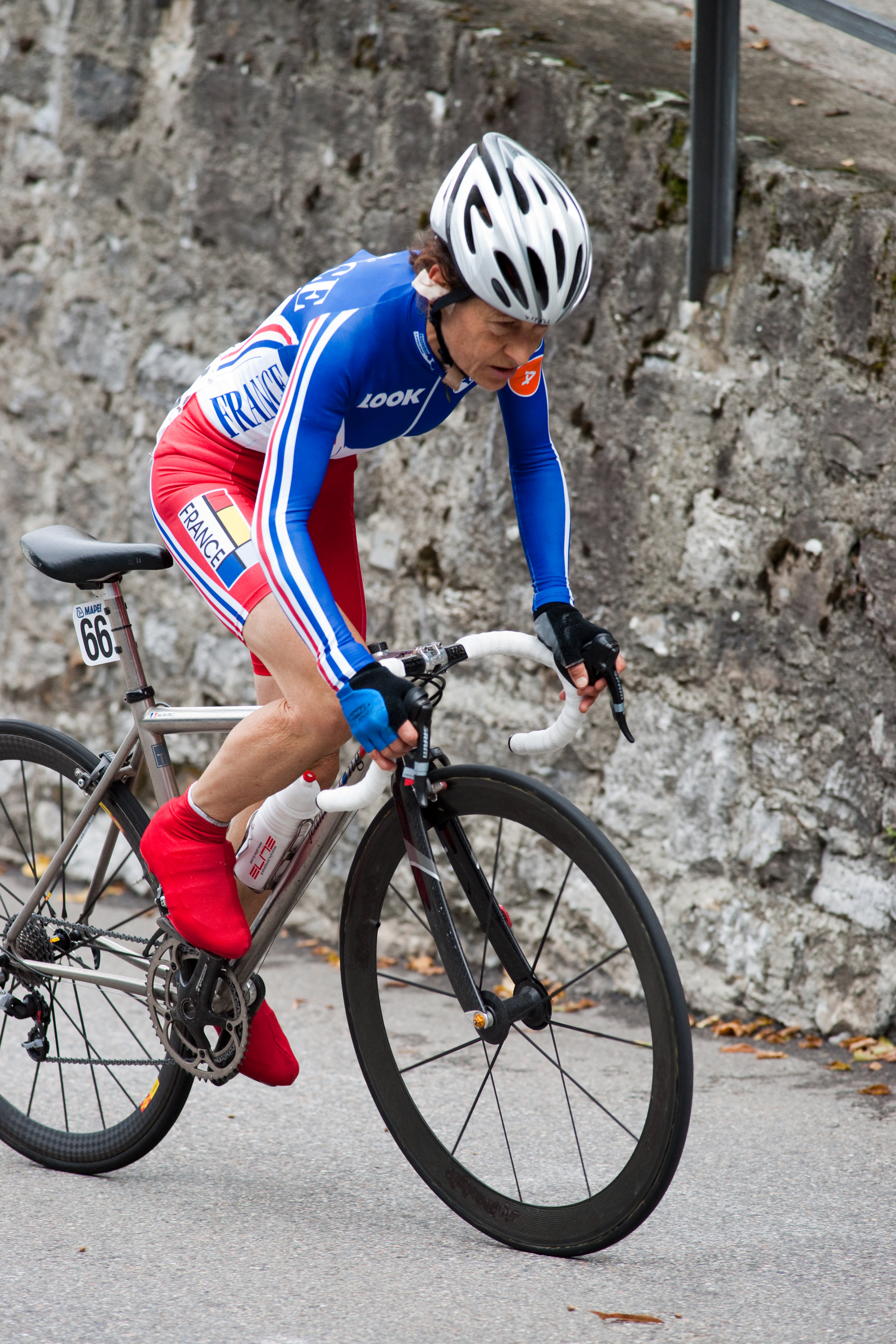
Jeannie Longo in 2009, who has been the French road race champion 20 times

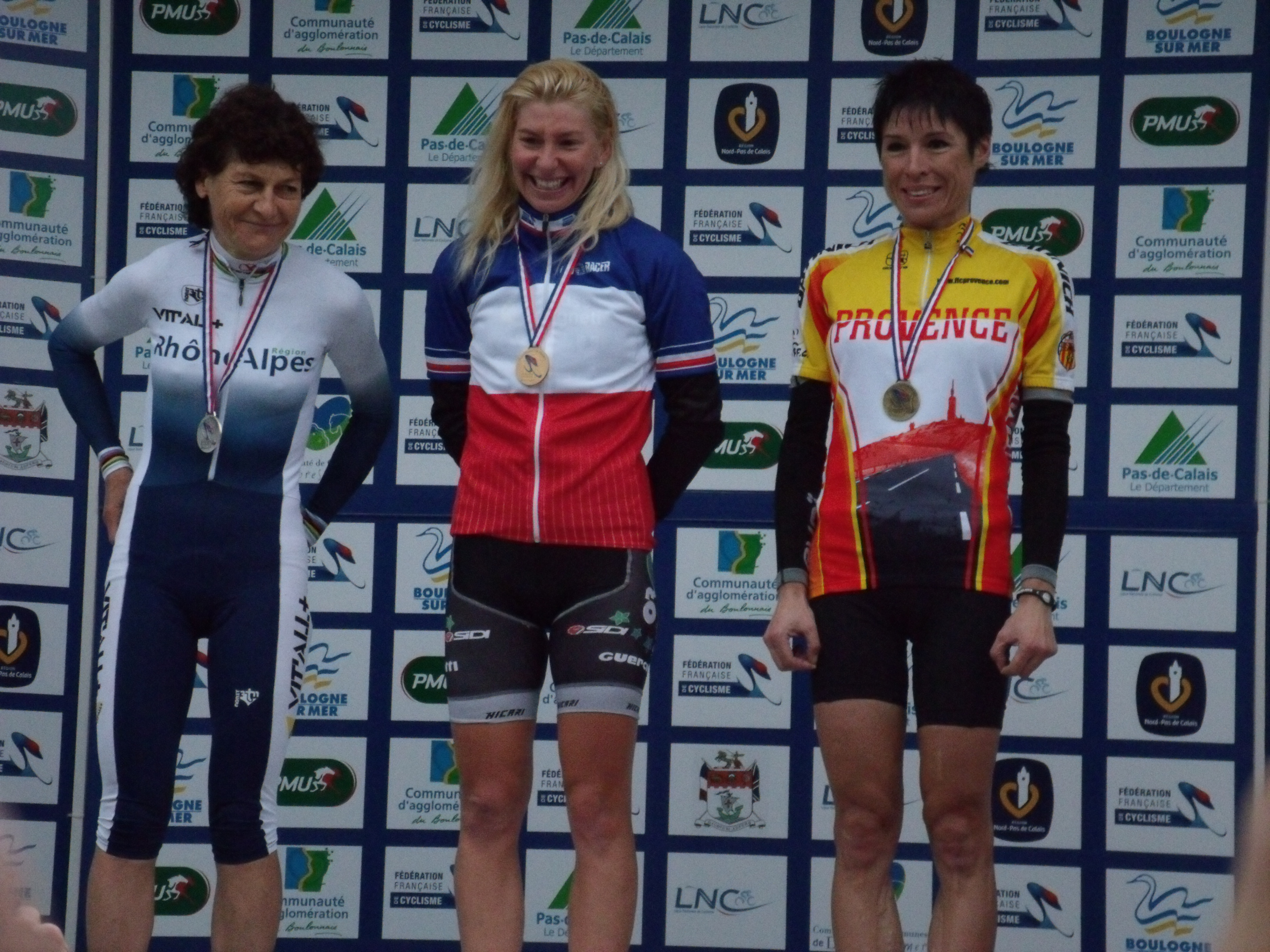
2011 women's podium

Year	Location	Gold	Silver	Bronze
1951	Nantes	Lucienne Benoît	Georgette Rodet	Jeannine Lemaire
1952	Montlhéry	Jeannine Lemaire	Gaby Guillard	Huguette Luneau
1953	Nantes	Jeannine Lemaire	Gaby Guillard	Reine Lacave
1954	Roanne	Noelle Sabbe	Jeannine Lemaire	Josephine Bardelet
1955	Montlhéry	Lydia Brein-Haritonides	Marie-Jeanne Donabedian	Simone Demory
1956	Longwy	Lyli Herse	Marie-Jeanne Donabedian	Renée Vissac
1957	Bourg-en-Bresse	Lyli Herse	Pierrette Soupiret	Marie-Jeanne Donabedian
1958	Montlhéry	Lyli Herse	Renée Vissac	Gilberte Rocaboy
1959	Landivisiau	Lyli Herse	Renée Vissac	Simone Demory
1960	Annemasse	Renée Vissac	Lyli Herse	Andrée Vaudel
1961	Louvroil	Lyli Herse	Simone Heutte	Renée Vissac
1962	Saint-Hilaire-du-Harcouët	Lyli Herse	Andrée Flageolet	Renée Vissac
1963	Sancerre	Lyli Herse	Renée Thuin	Andrée Flageolet
1964	Coutances	Andrée Flageolet	Lyli Herse	Renée Vissac
1965	Bully-les-Mines	Lyli Herse	Renée Vissac	Simone Boubechiche
1966	Le Havre	Gisèle Caille	Claude Bordujenko	Lyli Herse
1967	Xertigny	Lyli Herse	Christiane Rousseau	Renée Vissac
1968	Port-de-Bouc	Chantal N'Guten	Jacky Barbedette	Micheline Le Moigne
1969	Rouen-Les-Essarts	Geneviève Gambillon	Danièle Piton	Micheline Le Moigne
1970	Sérent	Geneviève Gambillon	Micheline Le Moigne	Chantal Heuveline
1971	Jeumont	Annick Chapron	Geneviève Gambillon	Béatrice Vachet
1972	Vitteaux	Geneviève Gambillon	Josiane Bost	Sylviane Junal
1973	Dax	Élisabeth Camus	Mauricette Carpentier	Geneviève Gambillon
1974	Montpinchon	Geneviève Gambillon	Annick Chapron	Élisabeth Camus
1975	Callac	Geneviève Gambillon	Josiane Bost	Jeanine Martin-Leborgne
1976	Lignac	Geneviève Gambillon	Nicole Verzier	Josiane Bost
1977	Pomport	Geneviève Gambillon	Josiane Bost	Nicole Verzier
1978	Escoussens	Chantal Fortier	Colette Savary-Davaine	Élisabeth Camus
1979	Neufchâtel-en-Saosnois	Jeannie Longo	Élisabeth Camus	Nathalie Diart
1980	Villié-Morgon	Jeannie Longo	Chantal Fortier	Sylvie Brémond
1981	Charleville-Mézières	Jeannie Longo	Fabienne Amedro	Valérie Simonnet
1982	Bressuire	Jeannie Longo	Fabienne Amedro	Chantal Pouline
1983	Wintzenheim	Jeannie Longo	Corinne Crunelle	Dominique Damiani
1984	Berck	Jeannie Longo	Isabelle Nicoloso	Nathalie Pelletier
1985	Chailley	Jeannie Longo	Valérie Simonnet	Dominique Damiani
1986	Châteaulin	Jeannie Longo-Ciprelli	Valérie Simonnet	Isabelle Nicoloso-Verger
1987	Lugny	Jeannie Longo-Ciprelli	Valérie Simonnet	Martine L'Haridon
1988	Saint-Étienne	Jeannie Longo-Ciprelli	Valérie Simonnet	Dominique Damiani
1989	Montluçon	Jeannie Longo-Ciprelli	Valérie Simonnet	Sandrine Lestrade
1990	Saint-Saulge	Catherine Marsal	Elisabeth Mahaut	Barbara Aulnette
1991	Saint-Saulge	Marion Clignet	Nathalie Cantet	Sandrine Lestrade
1992	Avize	Jeannie Longo-Ciprelli	Marion Clignet	Laurence Leboucher
1993	Châtellerault	Marion Clignet	Catherine Marsal	Corinne Legal
1994	Fontenay-le-Comte	Chantal Gorostegui	Jocelyne Hugi-Messori	Catherine Marsal
1995	La Cluse-et-Mijoux	Jeannie Longo-Ciprelli	Catherine Marsal	Élisabeth Chevanne Brunel
1996	Castres	Catherine Marsal	Jeannie Longo-Ciprelli	Jocelyne Hugi-Messori
1997	Montlhéry	Sylvie Riedle	Emmanuelle Farcy	Catherine Marsal
1998	Clermont-Ferrand	Jeannie Longo-Ciprelli	Séverine Desbouys	Fanny Lecourtois
1999	Clermont-Ferrand	Jeannie Longo-Ciprelli	Géraldine Jehl-Loewenguth	Séverine Desbouys
2000	Le Poiré-sur-Vie	Jeannie Longo-Ciprelli	Catherine Marsal	Magali Le Floc'h
2001	Argenton-sur-Creuse	Jeannie Longo-Ciprelli	Sonia Huguet	Catherine Marsal
2002	Briançon	Magali Le Floc'h	Edwige Pitel	Béatrice Thomas
2003	Plumelec	Sonia Huguet	Maryline Salvetat	Delphine Guille
2004	Pont-du-Fossé	Jeannie Longo-Ciprelli	Élisabeth Chevanne Brunel	Sandrine Marcuz-Moreau
2005	Boulogne-sur-Mer	Magali Le Floc'h	Sandrine Marcuz-Moreau	Karine Gautard
2006	Chantonnay	Jeannie Longo-Ciprelli	Béatrice Thomas	Élodie Touffet
2007	Aurillac	Edwige Pitel	Jeannie Longo-Ciprelli	Marina Jaunâtre
2008	Semur-en-Auxois	Jeannie Longo	Christel Ferrier-Bruneau	Edwige Pitel
2009	Saint-Brieuc	Christel Ferrier-Bruneau	Marina Jaunâtre	Jeannie Longo
2010	Chantonnay	Mélodie Lesueur	Amélie Rivat	Jeannie Longo
2011	Boulogne-sur-Mer	Christel Ferrier-Bruneau	Jeannie Longo	Magdalena de Saint-Jean
2012	Saint-Amand-les-Eaux	Marion Rousse	Julie Krasniak	Fanny Riberot
2013	Lannilis	Élise Delzenne	Amélie Rivat	Aude Biannic
2014	Futuroscope	Pauline Ferrand-Prévot	Mélodie Lesueur	Fanny Riberot
2015	Chantonnay	Pauline Ferrand-Prévot	Audrey Cordon	Amélie Rivat
2016	Vesoul	Edwige Pitel	Marjolaine Bazin	Audrey Cordon
2017	Saint-Omer	Charlotte Bravard	Amélie Rivat	Marjolaine Bazin
2018	Mantes-la-Jolie	Aude Biannic	Gladys Verhulst	Annabelle Dreville
2019	La Haie-Fouassière	Jade Wiel	Victorie Guilman	Aude Biannic
2020	Grand-Champ	Audrey Cordon-Ragot	Gladys Verhulst	Clara Copponi
2021	Épinal	Évita Muzic	Audrey Cordon-Ragot	Gladys Verhulst
2022	Cholet	Audrey Cordon-Ragot	Gladys Verhulst	Noémie Abgrall
2023	Hazebrouck	Victoire Berteau	Marie Le Net	Jade Wiel
2024	Saint-Martin-de-Landelles	Juliette Labous	Gladys Verhulst	Jade Wiel
2025	Les Herbiers	Marie Le Net	Léa Curinier	Julie Bego
2026	La Tour-du-Pin	Célia Gery	Cédrine Kerbaol	Émilie Morier

== Amateur men ==
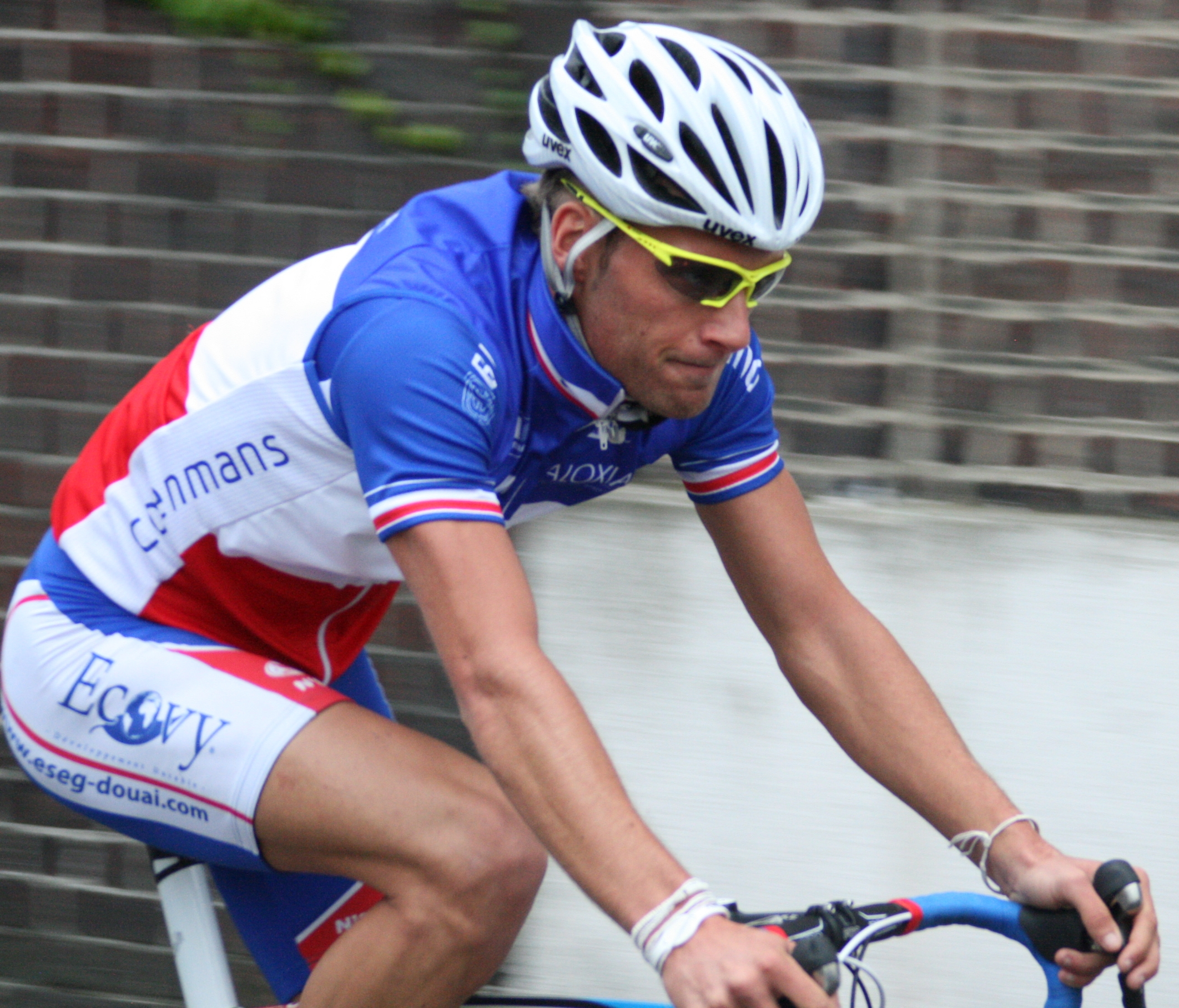
Anthony Colin wears the French champion's jersey in 2010

Year	Gold	Silver	Bronze
1899	Ernest Simon	Amédée Labarbe	Albert Luchtmeyer
1900	Gabriel Petit	Georges Lorgeou	J. Brochard
1901	Joseph Berthet	August Lapré	Marcel Cadolle
1902	Eugène Bernaud	Eugène Forestier	Paul Armbruster
1903	Marcel Cadolle	René Pottier	Albert Gazel
1904	Albert Gazel	Marcel Lécuyer	Auguste Garnier
1905	Fernand Vast	Maurice Leturgie	Georges Perrette
1906	Philippe Leroux	Ribera	É. Bettini
1907	Octave Lapize	Émile Wirtz	Maurice Brocco
1908	Paul Mazan	Émile Engel	Émile Wirtz
1909	Georges Perrette	Émile Wirtz	Paul Hostein
1910	Victor Philippe	José Pelletier	Louis Luquet
1911	Georges Lutz	Georges Perrette	Honoré Barthélémy
1912	Arsène Alancourt	François Passerieu	Raymond Bailly
1913	Eugène Bezaud	Arsène Alancourt	Charles Antonin
1914	Jean Guieu	Édouard Boisnard	Arsène Alancourt
1915– 1919	Not held due to World War I		
1920	Robert Reboul	Jean Hillarion	Achille Souchard
1921	Robert Grassin	Arsène Alancourt	Auguste Sabatier
1922	Achille Souchard	Gabriel Rerolle	Paul Befferat
1923	Achille Souchard	Robert Roussel	André Leducq
1924	René Hamel	Armand Blanchonnet	Georges Wambst
1925	André Leducq	René Brossy	Jean Labordes
1926	André Raynaud	Octave Dayen	François Urago
1927	André Aumerle	René Brossy	Octave Dayen
1928	Jean Maréchal	Henri Mouillefarine	Octave Dayen
1929	René Brossy	Corentin Cornet	René Le Grevès
1930	Henri Bergerioux	René Le Grevès	Jean Noret
1931	Yves Le Goff	Robert Godard	Maurice Brun
1932	Philippe Bono	Étienne Parizet	Georges Vey
1933	André Deforge	Robert Godard	Georges Vey
1934	Paul Maye	Robert Renoncé	Paul Laroulandie
1935	Robert Godard	Robert Charpentier	Paul Couderc
1936	Raymond Lemarié	Edmond Cazenabe	Georges Mery
1937	Serge Svoboda	René Lafosse	Antoine Pellet
1938	Albert Fabre	Jean Gecelle	Robert Panier
1939	Claude Govaert	Marcel Vandevelde	Robert Dorgebray
1940	Not held		
1941	Gino Proietti	Raymond Guégan	
1942	Paul Néri	Louis Turmel	René Cador
1943	Michel Rabut	Alphonse De Vreese	Roger Piel
1944	Not held		
1945	Jean Guéguen	René Lafosse	José Beyaert
1946	Louison Bobet	Gustave Imbert	Raymond Laborderie
1947	Jean Bidart	Robert Desbats	François Person
1948	Jean Erussard	Victor Fraccaro	Pierre Proust
1949	Robert Varnajo	Roger Huraux	Roger Bisetti
1950	Charles Ausset	Georges Decaux	Armand Lelli
1951	Jean Dacquay	Gaston Hyardet	Roger Huet
1952	Jacques Anquetil	Claude Rouer	Jacques Galland
1953	Raymond Horrelbecke	Gilbert Saulière	Christian Famuel
1954	Roger Bourgeois	Michel Vermeulin	Roger Darrigade
1955	Roger Darrigade	Maurice Moucheraud	Marcel Leprévost
1956	Jean Graczyk	Arnaud Geyre	André Le Dissez
1957	Joseph Boudon	Bernard Viot	Georges Dequesne
1958	Augustin Corteggiani	Robert Sciardis	Joseph Boudon
1959	Claude Sauvage	Jean-Claude Lebaube	Joseph Boudon
1960	Roland Lacombe	Joseph Boudon	Lucien Aimar
1961	Jacques Gestraut	Jean Arzé	Henri Belena
1962	Francis Bazire	Michel Béchet	Jacques Hurel
1963	Jean Dumont	Francis Bazire	Lucien Aimar
1964	Christian Raymond	Paul Lemeteyer	Jean Dumont
1965	Claude Guyot	André Desvages	Jacques Botherel
1966	Roger Lancien	Jean-Claude Maroilleau	Jean-Claude Lainé
1967	Jean-Pierre Boulard	Henri Heintz	Francis Ducreux
1968	Stéphan Abrahamian	Pierre Gautier	Jean-Pierre Danguillaume
1969	Daniel Ducreux	Ladislas Zakreta	Jean-Pierre Danguillaume
1970	Jean Thomazeau	Raymond Martin	Jacky Chan-Tsin
1971	Richard Podesta	Marcel Duchemin	Claude Aigueparses
1972	Raymond Martin	Jean-Claude Meunier	Régis Ovion
1973	Hervé Florio	Francis Duteil	Alain Cigana
1974	Rachel Dard	Jean Chassang	Christian Seznec
1975	Jacques Stablinski	Bernard Osmont	Sylvain Blandon
1976	Francis Duteil	Jean-René Bernaudeau	Christian Jourdan
1977	Patrick Friou	Jean-René Bernaudeau	Philippe Bodier
1978	Gérard Dessertene	Christian Jourdan	Gérard Macé
1979	Francis Duteil	Michel Larpe	Jean-François Rodriguez
1980	Christian Fauré	Dominique Celle	Régis Clère
1981	Philippe Dalibard	Étienne Néant	Marc Gomez
1982	Laurent Biondi	René Bajan	Denis Roux
1983	Jean-François Bernard	Denis Roux	Michel Jean
1984	Daniel Amardeilh	François Lemarchand	Pascal Dubois
1985	Daniel Amardeilh	Yves Bonnamour	Loïc Le Flohic
1986	Claude Carlin	Gérard Rué	Gilles Sanders
1987	Gérard Guazzini	Patrick Vallet	Thierry Laurent
1988	Serge Bodin	Laurent Madouas	
1989	Nicolas Dubois	Stéphane Dief	Marcel Kaikinger
1990	Franck Morelle	Patrick Bruet	Régis Simon
1991	Thomas Davy	Éric Fouix	Stéphane Galbois
1992	Pascal Hervé	Jean-Pierre Bourgeot	Christophe Faudot
1993	Jimmy Delbove	Jean-Paul Garde	Pascal Peyramaure
1994	Sébastien Medan	Jean-Jacques Henry	Damien Nazon
1995	Christophe Thébault	Christophe Agnolutto	Franck Tognini
1996	Frank Hérembourg	Sébastien Laroche	Éric Pascal
1997	Laurent Planchaud	Stéphane Foucher	Brice Bouniot
1998	Thierry Loder	Michel Lallouët	Stéphane Rifflet
1999	Ludovic Turpin	Cédric Célarier	Freddy Ravaleu
2000	Romain Mary	Lénaïc Olivier	Samuel Bonnet
2001	Nicolas André	Guillaume Lejeune	Sylvain Lavergne
2002 (Note: The original winner Freddy Bichot was disqualified following a positive drugs test for corticoids.)	Frédéric Delalande		
2003	Alexandre Grux	Noan Lelarge	Matthieu Sprick
2004	Christophe Riblon	Denis Robin	Noan Lelarge
2005	Rémi Pauriol	Arnaud Lesvenan	Médéric Clain
2006	Dimitri Champion	Arnaud Lesvenan	Nicolas Rousseau
2007	Loïc Herbreteau	Jean-Charles Sénac	Nicolas Reynaud
2008	Jean-Christophe Péraud	Guillaume Bonnafond	Blel Kadri
2009	Samuel Plouhinec	Arthur Vichot	Frédéric Finot
2010	Anthony Colin	Julien Guay	Étienne Tortelier
2011	Freddy Bichot	Samuel Plouhinec	Mathieu Converset
2012	Jimmy Raibaud	Cyrille Patoux	Olivier Le Gac
2013	Cédric Delaplace	Clément Saint-Martin	Yann Guyot
2014	Yann Guyot	Jérôme Mainard	Anthony Turgis
2015	Clément Mary	Florent Pereira	Nans Peters
2016	Valentin Madouas	Benoît Cosnefroy	David Gaudu
2017	Flavien Maurelet	Bruno Armirail	Alexis Guérin
2018	Geoffrey Bouchard	Flavien Dassonville	Axel Flet
2019	Alexis Renard	Maxime Urruty	Eddy Finé
2020	Jason Tesson	Émilien Jeannière	Clément Jolibert
2021	Axel Mariault	Louis Richard	Paul Lapeira
2022	Mattéo Vercher	Mickaël Guichard	Maximilien Juillard
2023	Killian Verschuren	Baptiste Huyet	Clément Carisey
2024	Titouan Margueritat	Baptiste Poulard	Joris Chaussinand

== Under 23 men ==
Year	Gold	Silver	Bronze
1994	Cyril Saugrain	Anthony Morin	Yvan Martin
1995	Brice Bouniot	Carlos Da Cruz	Nicolas Perthuis
1996	Samuel Plouhinec	Frédéric Finot	Stéphane Auroux
1997	Stéphane Bergès	Alexandre Grux	Denis Salmon
1998	Stéphane Couge	Florent Brard	Ludovic Martin
1999	Freddy Ravaleu	Christophe Laurent	Nicolas Dieudonné
2000	Nicolas Boulenger	Franck Havidic	Anthony Charteau
2001	Niels Brouzes	Jérôme Pineau	Samuel Rouyer
2002	Yann Pollet	Christophe Kern	Éric Berthou
2003	Kilian Patour	Matthieu Sprick	Lloyd Mondory
2004	Julien Loubet	Benoît Sinner	Yann Huguet
2005	Aurélien Passeron	Stéphane Poulhies	Benoît Sinner
2006	Florian Morizot	Guillaume Le Floch	Blaise Sonnery
2007	Jérôme Coppel	Guillaume Levarlet	Blel Kadri
2008	Arnaud Courteille	Arthur Vichot	Romain Hardy
2009	Alexandre Lemair	Geoffrey Soupe	Anthony Delaplace
2010	Geoffrey Soupe	Thomas Damuseau	Adrien Petit
2011	Damien Le Fustec	Arnaud Démare	Rudy Molard
2012	Quentin Bernier	Alexis Gougeard	Maxime Renault
2013	Flavien Dassonville	Jules Pijourlet	Guillaume Thévenot
2014	Jérémy Leveau	David Cherbonnet	Guillaume Thévenot
2015	Hugo Hofstetter	Franck Bonnamour	Paul Sauvage
2016	Paul Ourselin	Benoît Cosnefroy	Corentin Ermenault
2017	Victor Lafay	Benoît Cosnefroy	Damien Touzé
2018	Cyril Barthe	Alexys Brunel	Maxime Jarnet
2019	Théo Delacroix	Anthony Jullien	Matis Louvel
2020	Axel Zingle	Florian Dauphin	Matis Louvel
2021	Valentin Retailleau	Mathis Le Berre	Antoine Devanne
2022	Nicolas Breuillard	Théo Degache	Romain Grégoire
2023	Alexy Faure Prost	Maximilien Juillard	Axel Huens
2024	Noa Isidore	Brieuc Rolland	Louis Rouland

== Under 23 women ==
Year	Gold	Silver	Bronze
2000	Sophie Creux	Sandrine Marcuz	Virginie Moinard
2001	Juliette Vandekerckhove	Sophie Creux	Virginie Moinard
2002	Béatrice Thomas		
2003	Delphine Guille	Juliette Vandekerckhove	Sophie Creux
2004	Marina Jaunâtre	Magali Mocquery	Fanny Riberot
2005	Karine Gautard	Fanny Riberot	Nathalie Jeuland
2006	Pascale Jeuland	Karine Gautard	Eugénie Mermillod
2007	Julie Krasniak	Nathalie Jeuland	Mélanie Bravard
2008	Julie Krasniak	Émilie Blanquefort	Amélie Rivat
2009	Julie Krasniak	Mélodie Lesueur	Audrey Cordon
2010	Mélodie Lesueur	Amélie Rivat	Audrey Cordon
2011	Audrey Cordon	Amélie Rivat	Pauline Ferrand-Prévot
2012	Marion Rousse	Marion Azam	Steffi Jamoneau
2013	Aude Biannic	Pauline Ferrand-Prévot	Marion Sicot
2014	Pauline Ferrand-Prévot	Coralie Demay	Marine Strappazzon
2015	Émilie Rochedy	Séverine Eraud	Soline Lamboley
2016	Léna Gérault	Victorie Guilman	Séverine Eraud
2017	Fanny Zambon	Victorie Guilman	Pauline Allin
2018	Gladys Verhulst	Juliette Labous	Lucie Jounier
2019	Évita Muzic	Gladys Verhulst	Lucie Jounier
2020	Laura Asencio	Marie Le Net	Victoire Berteau
2021	India Grangier	Maëva Squiban	Anaïs Morichon
2022	Amandine Fouquenet	Dilyxine Miermont	Line Burquier
2023	Océane Mahé	Églantine Rayer	Maëva Squiban
2024	Lise Ménage	Clémence Latimier	Heidi Gaugain

== Junior men ==
Year	Gold	Silver	Bronze
1952	Jacques Olivier	Roger Napolitano	
1953	Jacques Sadot	Damien Pomeon	Robert Dugue
1954	Bernard Deconink	Hubert Ferrer	Jacky Chantelouve
1955	Claude Cousseau	Bernard Eychenne	Marcel Cruz
1956	Yves Laboulais	Francis Bazire	Christian Battiston
1957	Christian Buiatti	Alain Vera	Henri Cubito
1958	Gilbert Bourban	Michel Reymond	Daniel Jacquelin
1959	Paul Lemeteyer	Michel Brie	Michel Ringeard
1960	Henri Rabaute	Michel Marie	Neyt
1961	Pierre Trentin	Daniel Fix	Daniel Morelon
1962	Jacques Delarue	Jean-Louis Gauthier	Jacques Guiot
1963	Michel Briant	René Bachelard	Élie Beaugrand
1964	Jean-Pierre Livet	Cyrille Guimard	Claude Guyot
1965	Mariano Martínez	Jacques Remstein	Patrick François
1966	Xavier Salles	Bernard Bringuier	Michel Lory
1967	Jean-Luc Molinéris	Jacky Portejoie	Gérard Berthomet
1968	Bernard Thévenet	Alain Germain	Gérard Comby
1969	Guy Dolhats	Jean-Marc Clisson	Henri Jarrot
1970	Jacques Marget	Jean-Michel Avril	Jean-Luc Manchon
1971	Jean-Marie Vasseur	Dominique Sandon	Jean-Luc Blanchardon
1972	Bernard Hinault	Didier Lebaud	Gérard Naddéo
1973	Yves Chagny	Jean-Claude Benoit	Yves Daniel
1974	Pascal Simon	Frédéric Motte	Christian Levavasseur
1975	Pascal Knepper	Pierre Sclavounos	Philippe Gueydon
1976	Yves Rimbaud	Philippe Dalibard	Pascal Trimaille
1977	Christian Merlot	Michel Cornelise	Pascal Guyot
1978	Patrick Duhaut	Philippe Chevallier	Bruno Guillou
1979	Philippe Chevallier	Jean-Luc Gilbert	Philippe Lauraire
1980	Vincent Barteau	Patrice Camus	Charly Mottet
1981	Thierry Lerall	Jean-Marc Manfrin	Éric Boyer
1982	Philippe Bouvatier	Jean-Luc Braillon	Thierry Haour
1983	Jean Vallès	Philippe Brenner	Pascal Audoux
1984	William Perard	Fabien Pantaglou	Yvon Le Fur
1985	Philippe Peugnet	Bruno Bonnet	Vincent Lacressonnière
1986	Jacques Coualan	Christophe Faudot	Jean-Luc Bertrand
1987	Jean-Cyril Robin	Eddy Seigneur	Philippe Ermenault
1988	Cyril Sabatier	Denis Marie	Emmanuel Mallet
1989	Frédéric Pere	Ludovic Auger	Jean-François Guérin
1990	Frédéric Lasalle	Philippe Gaumont	Jean-Yves Mançais
1991	Samuel Pelcat	Franck Trotel	Mickaël Pichon
1992	Benoît Salmon	Franck Bouyer	Frédéric Mainguenaud
1993	Antoine Skvor	Nicolas Boncourt	Cyril Legrand
1994	Alexandre Grux	Florent Brard	Nicolas Charles
1995	Gaël Moreau	Vincent Grenèche	Robert Crepeau
1996	Loïc Lamouller	Gaël Moreau	Fabrice Parent
1997	Régis Lhuillier	Eddy Lembo	Cédric Gouxette
1998	Régis Lhuillier	Jean Zen	Alexandre Naulleau
1999	Sébastien Morvan	Olivier Cambet	Serge Canouet
2000	Kilian Patour	Kevin Enfer	David Cancian
2001	Régis Franchequin	Julien Belgy	Mathieu Claude
2002	Arnaud Gérard	Fabien Pasquier	Kenny Lembo
2003	Mikaël Cherel	Jonathan Hivert	Nicolas Hartmann
2004	Alexandre Binet	Blel Kadri	Aurélien Stelhy
2005	Sébastien Ivars	Yannick Valette	Alexandre Lemair
2006	Étienne Pieret	Aurélien Duval	Sylvain Dechereux
2007	Anthony Delaplace	Maxime Cornic	Etienne Fédrigo
2008	Kenny Elissonde	Pierre Bonnet	Grégoire Tarride
2009	Warren Barguil	Romain Guyot	Aurélien Lapalus
2010	Mathieu Le Lavandier	Geoffrey Millour	Anthony Mira
2011	Romain Faussurier	Pierre Latour	Valentin Dufour
2012	Félix Pouilly	Kévin Goulot	Marc Fournier
2013	Élie Gesbert	Axel Journiaux	Mathias Le Turnier
2014	Rayane Bouhanni	Léo Danes	Arthur Didelot
2015	Théo Menant	Alexys Brunel	Romain Pommelet
2016	Théo Nonnez	Tristan Montchamp	Quentin Grolleau
2017	Antoine Raugel	Florian Fattier	Antoine Burger
2018	Donavan Grondin	Quentin Emorine	Louis Barré
2019	Kévin Vauquelin	Thibault D'Hervez	Guillaume Broudeur
2020	Romain Grégoire	Bastien Tronchon	Antonin Souchon
2021	Romain Grégoire	Pierre Gautherat	Lenny Martinez
2022	Antoine L'Hote	Matys Grisel	Lénaïc Langella
2023	Noé Melot	Hugo Tapiz	Edwin Mercier

== Junior women ==
Year	Gold	Silver	Bronze
1979	Isabelle Gautheron		
1980	Agnès Balançon		
1981	Christine Gourmelon		
1982	Martine L'Haridon		
1983	Sandrine Lestrade		
1984	Karine Fiszer		
1985	Catherine Marsal		
1986	Catherine Marsal		
1987	Nathalie Cantet		
1988	Catherine Marsal		
1989	Laurence Leboucher	Armelle Chenet	Rachel Leroux
1990	Armelle Chenet	Séverine Bordener	Maryline Salvetat
1991	Maryline Salvetat	Sonia Huguet	Sophie Swaertvaeger
1992	Maryline Salvetat	Claire Poncelet	Élisabeth Chevanne Brunel
1993	Sophie Swaertvaeger	Élisabeth Chevanne Brunel	Soizic Ribault
1994	Aurélie G'Styr	Emmanuelle Farcy	Soizic Ribault
1995	Aurélie G'Styr	Virginie Carton	Gwladys Morey
1996	Alexandra Le Hénaff	Mélanie Morenvillez	Carine Peter
1997	Carine Peter	Séverine Prior	Fanny Jouvin
1998	Delphine Tonini	Élodie Touffet	Sophie Creux
1999	Virginie Moinard	Rebecca Menart	Ludivine Prévost
2000	Camille Valla	Juliette Vandekerckhove	Marina Jaunâtre
2001	Magali Mocquery	Vicky Fournial	Karine Gautard
2002	Vicky Fournial	Clotilde Giraudo	Sandrine Le Berr
2003	Eugénie Mermillod	Angélique Saldana	Aude Pollet
2004	Sandrine Allais	Christel Pourias	Blandine Stapf
2005	Joanne Duval	Jennifer Fischer	Julie Krasniak
2006	Émilie Blanquefort	Audrey Cordon	Amélie Rivat
2007	Élise Delzenne	Laurena Cussy	Justine Delannoy
2008	Aude Biannic	Aurore Verhoeven	Marion Royer
2009	Pauline Ferrand-Prévot	Roxane Fournier	Aude Biannic
2010	Pauline Ferrand-Prévot	Pauline Godey	Valentine Morin
2011	Manon Souyris	Fleur Faure	Valentine Morin
2012	Iris Sachet	Marine Lemarié	Ségolène Lebéron
2013	Laura Perry	Séverine Eraud	Solène Vinsot
2014	Soline Lamboley	Fanny Zambon	Chloé Fortin
2015	Typhaine Laurance	Gladys Verhulst	Pauline Corbet
2016	Juliette Labous	Pauline Clouard	Noémie Abgrall
2017	Évita Muzic	Jade Wiel	Célia Le Mouël
2018	Maïna Galand	Jade Wiel	Marie Le Net
2019	Cédrine Kerbaol	Ysoline Corbineau	Amandine Fouquenet
2020	Coline Raby	Flavie Boulais	Marie Camenen
2021	Eglantine Rayer	Maurène Trégouët	Lise Ménage
2022	Titia Ryo	Lise Ménage	Alizée Rigaux
2023	Léane Tabu	Alice Brédard	Marine Ferré

== See also ==
- French National Time Trial Championships
- National road cycling championships
