= Cholet Pays de Loire Dames =

French one-day road cycling race

Race details
- Date: March
- Region: France
- Discipline: Road
- Type: One day race

History
- First edition: 2004
- Editions: 12
- Final edition: 2015
- First winner: Élodie Touffet (FRA)
- Most wins: Emma Johansson (SWE) (3 wins)
- Final winner: Audrey Cordon (FRA)

Cholet Pays de Loire Dames was a women's one day cycle race which took place in Cholet, France between 2004 and 2015.

== Winners ==
| Year | Winner | Second | Third |
|---|---|---|---|
| 2004 | Élodie Touffet (FRA) | Cathy Moncassin (FRA) | Magali Finot-Laivier (FRA) |
| 2005 | Alexandra Le Henaff (FRA) | Élodie Touffet (FRA) | Magali Le Floc'h (FRA) |
| 2006 | Fanny Riberot (FRA) | Aude Pollet (FRA) | Pascale Jeuland (FRA) |
| 2007 | Marina Jaunâtre (FRA) | Laurence Leboucher (FRA) | Kata-liina Normak (EST) |
| 2008 | Magali Mocquery (FRA) | Magali Le Floc'h (FRA) | Marina Jaunâtre (FRA) |
| 2009 | Florence Girardet (FRA) | Megan Guarnier (USA) | Christine Majerus (LUX) |
| 2010 | Christel Ferrier-Bruneau (FRA) | Christine Majerus (LUX) | Mélanie Bravard (FRA) |
| 2011 | Emma Johansson (SWE) | Christel Ferrier-Bruneau (FRA) | Sara Mustonen (SWE) |
| 2012 | Audrey Cordon (FRA) | Pascale Jeuland (FRA) | Emilie Moberg (NOR) |
| 2013 | Emma Johansson (SWE) | Audrey Cordon (FRA) | Jolien D'Hoore (BEL) |
| 2014 | Emma Johansson (SWE) | Jolien D'Hoore (BEL) | Elisa Longo Borghini (ITA) |
| 2015 | Audrey Cordon (FRA) | Amélie Rivat (FRA) | Miriam Bjørnsrud (NOR) |
