= Grand Prix Féminin de Chambéry =

French one-day road cycling race

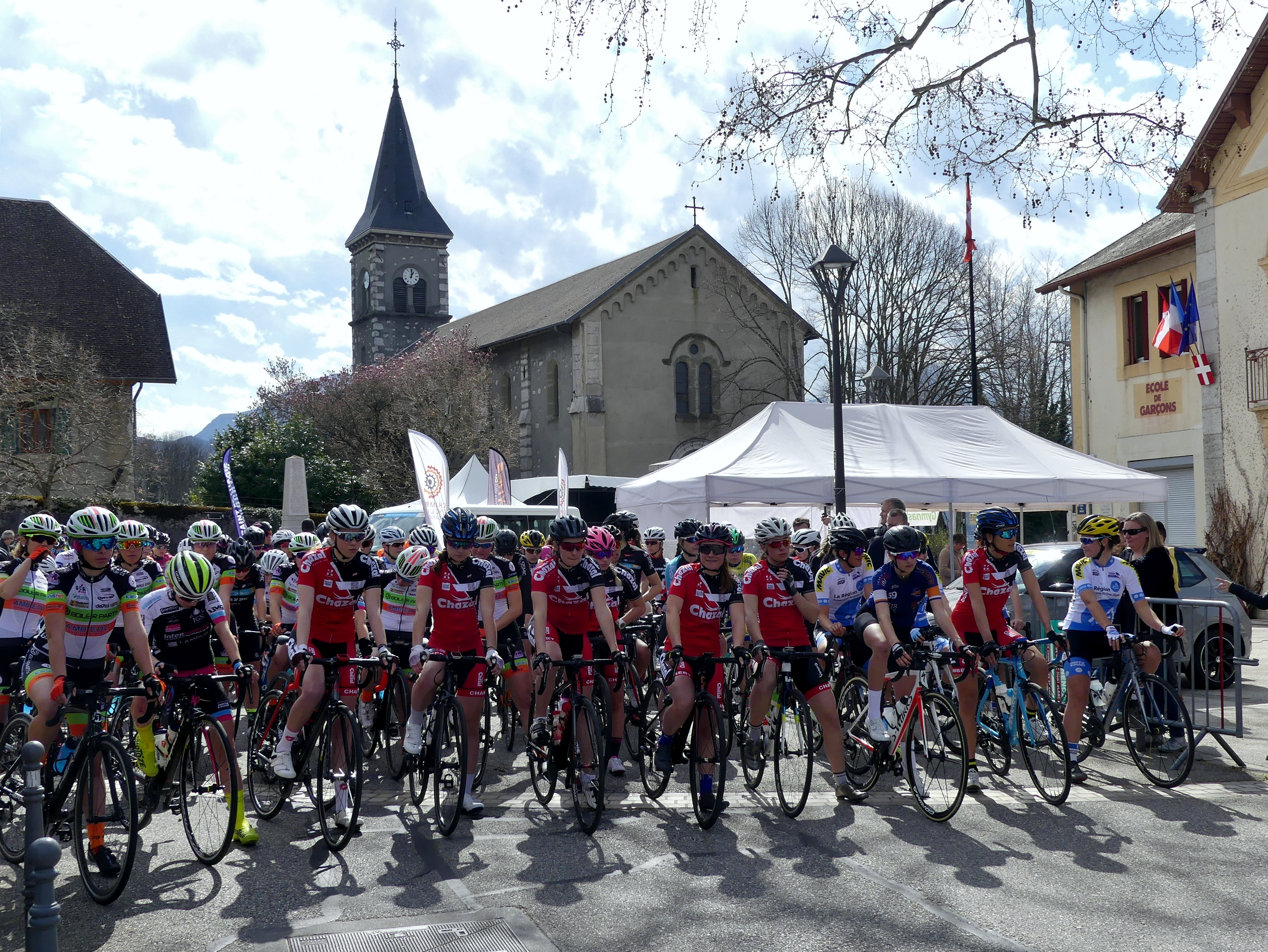
- The start of the 2019 edition

Race details
- Date: April
- Region: Chambéry, France
- Discipline: Road
- Organiser: Chambéry Cyclisme Organisation
- Web site: chamberycyclismeorganisation.com/grand-prix-de-chambery/

History
- First edition: 2003
- Editions: 25 (as of 2026)
- First winner: Sophie Creux (FRA)
- Most wins: Sophie Creux (FRA) (4 wins)
- Most recent: Célia Gery (FRA)

The Grand Prix Féminin de Chambéry is an elite women's professional one-day road bicycle race held annually in Chambéry, France. The event was first held in 2003. The race entered the UCI calendar in UCI as a category 1.2 event, before upgrading to 1.1 status the following year. It has also been on the calendar of the French Road Cycling Cup since 2015.

== Past winners ==
Year	Winner	Second	Third
2003	(France) Sophie Creux	(France) Jeannie Longo	(France) Virginie Moinard
2004	(New Zealand) Melissa Holt	(France) Jeannie Longo	(France) Marina Jaunâtre
2005	(France) Sophie Creux	(France) Fanny Riberot	(France) Alna Burato
2006	(France) Magali Mocquery	(France) Sophie Creux	(France) Sylvie Riedle
2007	(France) Magali Mocquery	(France) Fanny Riberot	(Estonia) Maaris Meier
2008	(France) Sophie Creux	(Lithuania) Modesta Vzesniauskaite	(Italy) Anna Zugno
2009	(Lithuania) Modesta Vzesniauskaite	(Italy) Noemi Cantele	(Switzerland) Nicole Brändli
2010	(France) Sophie Creux	(France) Edwige Pitel	(Czech Republic) Martina Ruzickova
2011	(France) Élodie Hegoburu	(France) Sophie Creux	(France) Edwige Pitel
2012	(France) Alexia Muffat	(France) Élodie Hegoburu	(France) Béatrice Thomas
2013	(Switzerland) Nicole Hanselmann	(France) Steffi Jamoneau	(France) Élodie Hegoburu
2014	(France) Amélie Rivat	(France) Sophie Creux	(France) Marion Sicot
2015	(France) Manon Souyris	(France) Amélie Rivat	(Italy) Soraya Paladin
2016	(France) Marjolaine Bazin	(France) Juliette Labous	(Portugal) Daniela Reis
2017	(France) Annabelle Dreville	(France) Séverine Eraud	(France) Ophélie Fenart
2018	(France) Manon Souyris	(Vietnam) Thi That Nguyen	(France) Evita Muzic
2019	(Italy) Katia Ragusa	(Trinidad and Tobago) Teniel Campbell	(France) Marie Giélen
2020	Cancelled		
2021	(France) Gladys Verhulst	(Italy) Giorgia Bariani	(Italy) Debora Silvestri
2022	(Australia) Brodie Chapman	(France) Victorie Guilman	(Italy) Cristina Tonetti
2023	(France) Victorie Guilman	(Italy) Erica Magnaldi	(France) Évita Muzic
2024	(Belgium) Lore De Schepper	(France) Évita Muzic	(Italy) Erica Magnaldi
2025	(Italy) Erica Magnaldi	(Austria) Mona Mitterwallner	(France) Léa Curinier
2024	(France) Célia Gery	(Italy) Erica Magnaldi	(Belgium) Lore De Schepper
2025	(Italy) Erica Magnaldi	(Austria) Mona Mitterwallner	(France) Léa Curinier
2026	(France) Célia Gery	(Italy) Erica Magnaldi	(Belgium) Lore De Schepper
