= Jade Wiel =

French cyclist (born 2000)

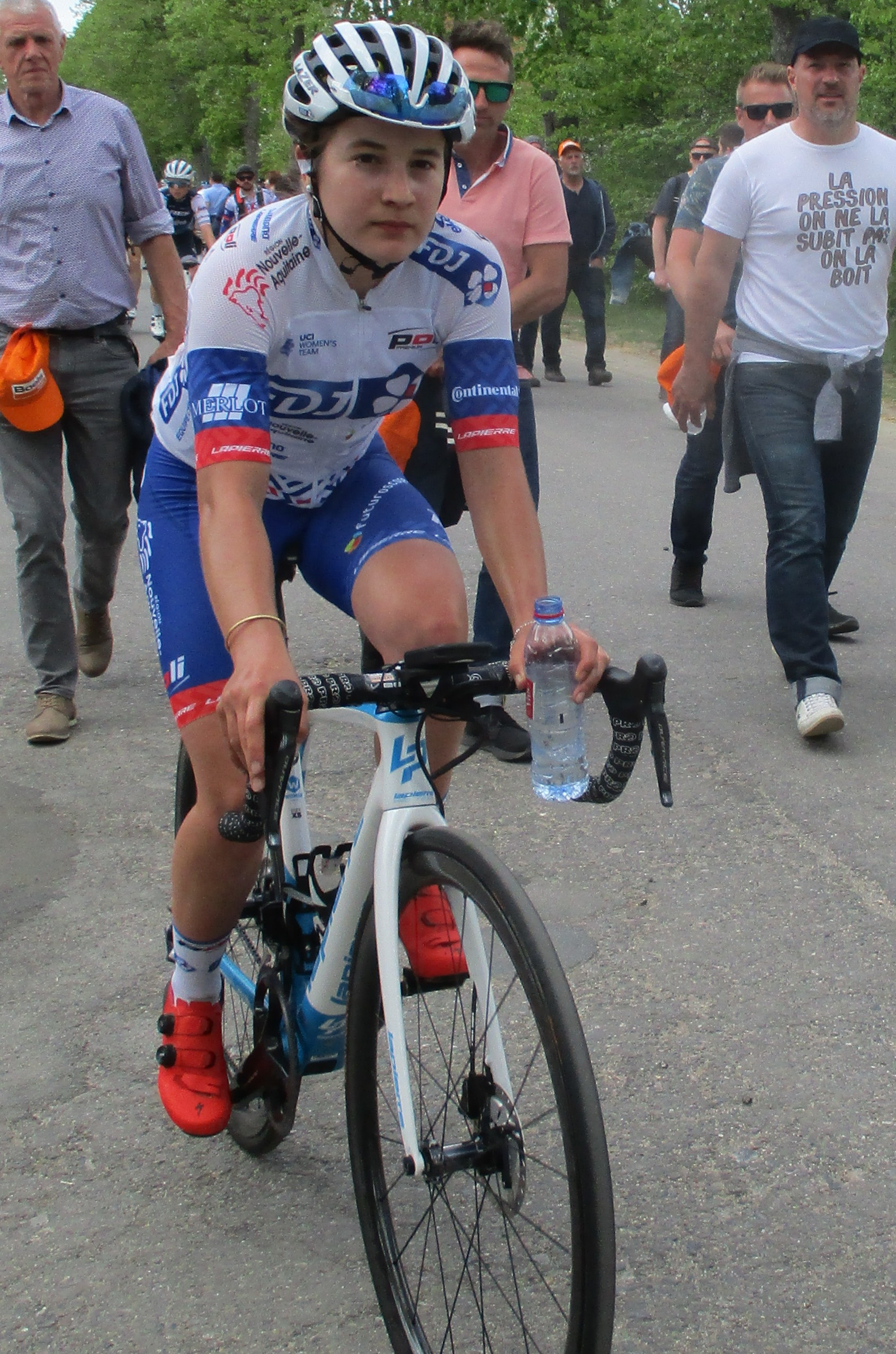
- Wiel in 2019

Personal information
- Full name: Jade Wiel
- Born: 2 April 2000 (age 26)

Cycling career
- Sport: Cycling
- Current team: FDJ United–Suez
- Discipline: Road
- Role: Rider

Professional team
- 2019–: FDJ Nouvelle-Aquitaine Futuroscope

Jade Wiel (born 2 April 2000) is a French professional racing cyclist, who currently rides for UCI Women's WorldTeam FDJ United–Suez. She won the 2019 French National Road Race Championships ahead of Victorie Guilman and Aude Biannic.

== Major results ==
2017
National Juniors Road Championships

2nd Road race
3rd Time trial

6th Trofeo Da Moreno - Piccolo Trofeo Alfredo Binda
2018
National Juniors Road Championships

1st Time trial
2nd Road race

8th Kreiz Breizh Elites Dames
2019
1st Road race, National Road Championships
6th Overall Kreiz Breizh Elites Dames
10th La Périgord Ladies
2021
5th La Picto-Charentaise
2022
5th Grand Prix Féminin de Chambéry
7th Grand Prix du Morbihan Féminin
7th Mediterranean Games Road race
10th A Travers les Hauts de France
2023
6th Grand Prix Féminin de Chambéry
