= Duteil =

Duteil is a surname. Notable people with the surname include:

- Francis Duteil (1947–2016), French cyclist
- Sidney Duteil (born 1955), French musician and television and radio host
- Yves Duteil (born 1949), French singer-songwriter
