= Régis Lhuillier =

French cyclist

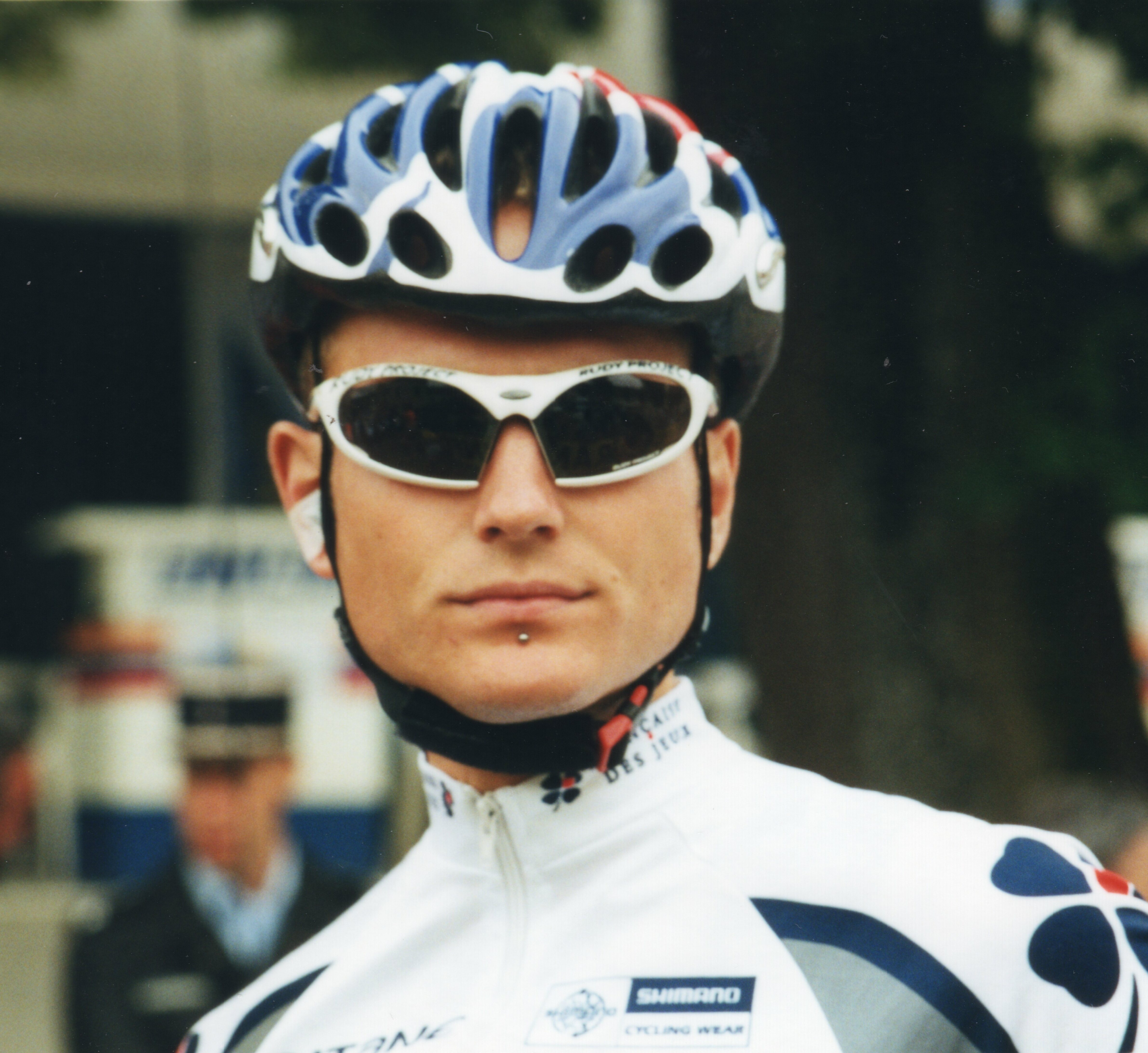
- Lhuillier at the 2001 Tour de l'Avenir

Personal information
- Born: 28 May 1980 (age 46) Saint-Die-des-Vosges, France

Cycling career
- Sport: Cycling
- Current team: Retired
- Discipline: Road
- Role: Rider

Amateur teams
- 1999: Française des Jeux (stagiaire)
- 2000: Française des Jeux (stagiaire)
- 2004–2005: AVC Aix-en-Provence

Professional team
- 2001–2003: Française des Jeux

Régis Lhuillier (born 28 May 1980) is a French former cyclist. He rode in the 2003 Giro d'Italia, but did not finish.

== Major results ==
1997
1st Junior National Road Race Championships
1998
1st Junior National Road Race Championships
2002
9th Overall Tour du Limousin
