= Lyli Herse =

French cyclist and coach

Personal information
- Born: 6 January 1928 Caen, France
- Died: 4 January 2018 (aged 89) Osny, France

Cycling career
- Sport: Cycling
- Role: Rider

Lysiane (Lyli) Herse (6 January 1928 – 4 January 2018) was a French racing cyclist and coach.

== Biography ==
Herse competed in the first Women's Tour de France in 1955, in which she finished fourth. She won the French national road race title nine times between 1956 and 1967. She later trained Geneviève Gambillon, who won two world titles in road racing in 1972 and 1974.

Herse's father, René Herse, was a manufacturer of cycles and she and her husband Jean Desbois took over his business upon his death in 1976. The company ceased production in 1986, and in 2007 Herse sold the brand to an American company.

Herse died in Osny, Val-d'Oise, on 4 January 2018, aged 89 years.
