= Geneviève Gambillon =

French cyclist (born 1951)

Personal information
- Full name: Geneviève Gambillon
- Born: 30 June 1951 (age 75) Hudimesnil, France

Cycling career
- Sport: Cycling
- Disciplines: Road & track
- Role: Rider

Major wins
- World Champion x2 (France) National Champion x22
Medal record
Representing France
UCI Road World Championships
Gold medal – first place	Gap 1972	Road Race
Gold medal – first place	Montreal 1974	Road Race

Geneviève Gambillon (born 30 June 1951, in Hudimesnil, Manche) is a former French road bicycle racer. She became the women's Road World Champion in 1972 and again in 1974. She retired from competition in 1978 and became a nurse at the hospital in Granville.

== Palmarès ==
1969
French National Road Race Championships
Sprint, French National Track Championships
Pursuit, French National Track Championships
1970
French National Road Race Championships
Sprint, French National Track Championships
Pursuit, French National Track Championships
1971
Sprint, French National Track Championships
Pursuit, French National Track Championships
2nd French National Road Race Championships
1972
UCI Road World Championships – Women's road race
French National Road Race Championships
Sprint, French National Track Championships
Pursuit, French National Track Championships
1973
Sprint, French National Track Championships
Pursuit, French National Track Championships
3rd French National Road Race Championships
1974
UCI Road World Championships – Women's road race
French National Road Race Championships
Sprint, French National Track Championships
Pursuit, French National Track Championships
1975
French National Road Race Championships
Pursuit, French National Track Championships
2nd UCI Road World Championships – Women's road race
2nd Sprint, French National Track Championships
1976
French National Road Race Championships
Sprint, French National Track Championships
Pursuit, French National Track Championships
1977
French National Road Race Championships
