= Élisabeth Camus =

French cyclist

Personal information
- Born: Grenoble, France

Cycling career
- Sport: Cycling
- Role: Rider

Élisabeth Camus is a French former racing cyclist. She won the French national road race title in 1973.
