= Renée Vissac =

French cyclist

Personal information
- Born: Langeac, France

Cycling career
- Sport: Cycling
- Role: Rider

Renée Vissac is a former French racing cyclist. She won the French national road race title in 1960.
