= Benoît Sinner =

French bicycle racer

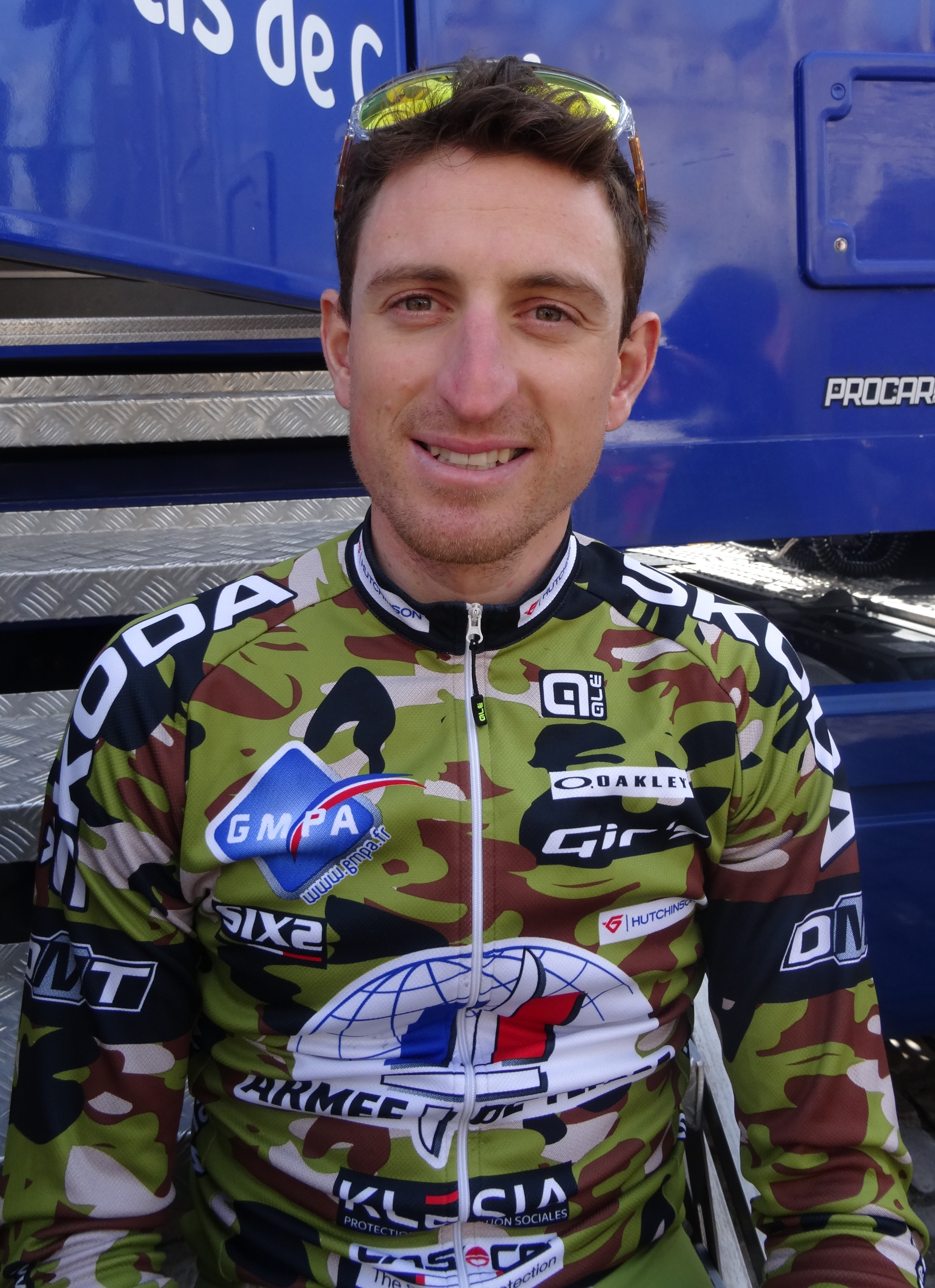

Personal information
- Born: August 7, 1984 (age 42) Fontenay-aux-Roses, France

Cycling career
- Sport: Cycling
- Current team: Peltrax–CS Dammarie-lès-Lys
- Discipline: Road
- Role: Rider

Amateur teams
- 2004–2005: UC Châteauroux
- 2010: Bonnat 91
- 2011–2014: Armée de Terre
- 2017: Team UC Nantes Atlantique
- 2018–: Peltrax–CS Dammarie-lès-Lys

Professional teams
- 2006–2008: Agritubel
- 2009: Besson Chaussures–Sojasun
- 2015–2016: Armée de Terre

Benoît Sinner (born 7 August 1984 in Fontenay-aux-Roses) is a French cyclist riding for Peltrax–CS Dammarie-lès-Lys.

== Major results ==
2004
2nd Road race, National Under-23 Road Championships
2005
1st Stage 1 Giro delle Regioni
2nd Overall Kreiz Breizh Elites
3rd Road race, National Under-23 Road Championships
3rd Overall Le Triptyque des Monts et Châteaux

1st Stage 3

4th Road race, UEC European Under-23 Road Championships
10th Overall Tour du Loir-et-Cher
2006
1st Road race, UEC European Under-23 Road Championships
3rd Boucles de l'Aulne
6th Overall Boucles de la Mayenne

1st Stage 1

9th Tro-Bro Léon
2008
9th Tro-Bro Léon
2009
3rd Overall Tour de Normandie
2012
8th Grand Prix des Marbriers
2013
8th Overall Boucles de la Mayenne

1st Points classification
1st Stage 1

9th Grand Prix de la ville de Nogent-sur-Oise
2014
6th Overall Kreiz Breizh Elites
2016
3rd Overall Tour de Normandie

1st Stage 4
