= Aude Biannic =

French cyclist (born 1991)

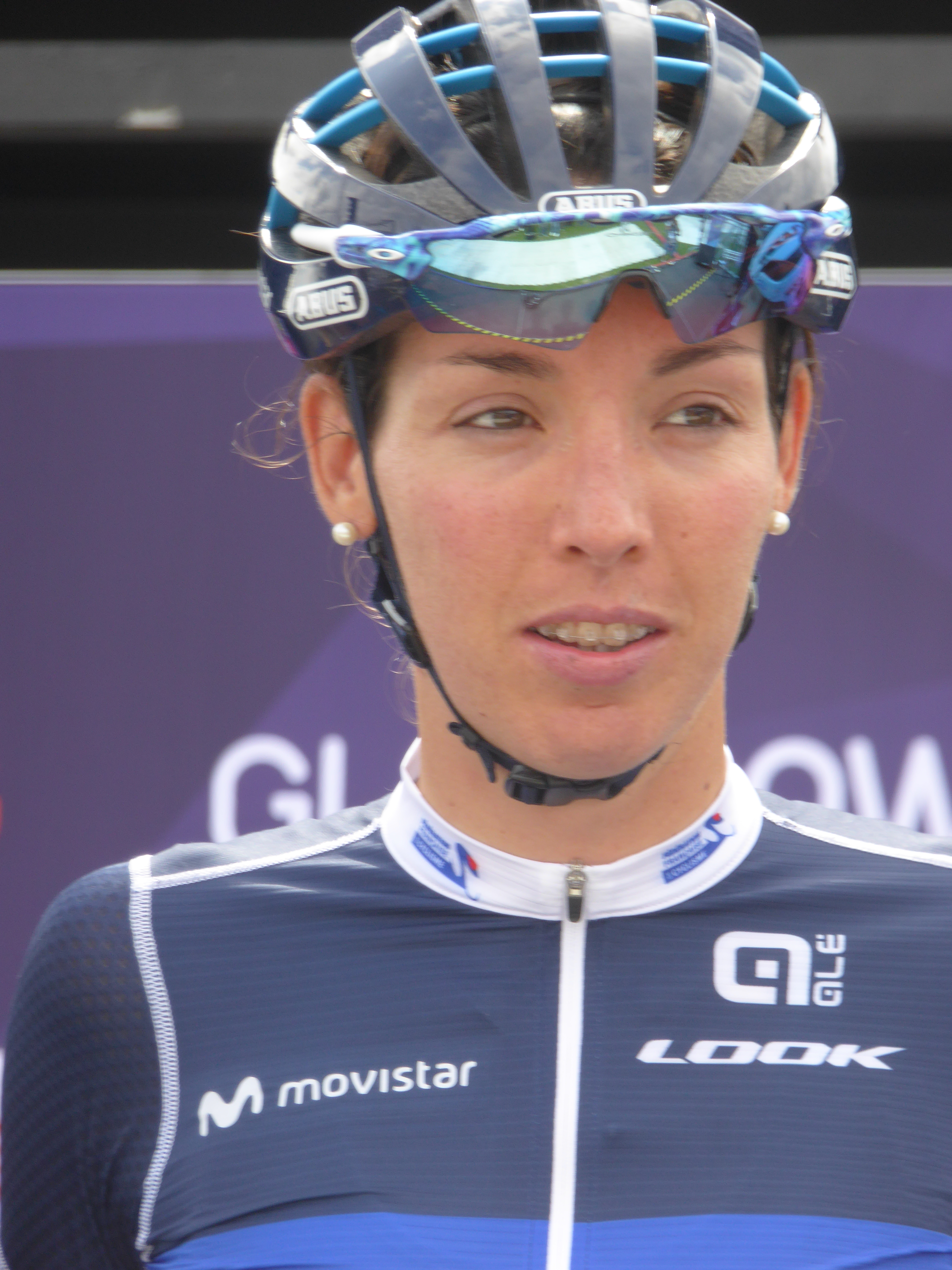
- Biannic at the 2018 European Road Cycling Championships.

Personal information
- Full name: Aude Biannic
- Born: 27 March 1991 (age 35) Landerneau, France

Cycling career
- Sport: Cycling
- Current team: Movistar Team
- Discipline: Road
- Role: Rider

Amateur team
- VS Plabennec

Professional teams
- 2013: S.C. Michela Fanini Rox
- 2014: Lointek
- 2015–2017: Poitou-Charentes.Futuroscope.86
- 2018–: Movistar Team

Aude Biannic (born 27 March 1991) is a French road bicycle racer, who currently rides for UCI Women's WorldTeam Movistar Team. She competed at the 2012 Summer Olympics in the Women's road race, finishing 10th.

== Major results ==
2008
1st Road race, National Junior Road Championships
2nd Individual pursuit, National Junior Track Championships
2009
2nd Points race, UEC European Junior Track Championships
National Junior Road Championships

2nd Time trial
3rd Road race

4th Trophée des Grimpeurs
8th Road race, UCI Juniors World Championships
2010
1st Time trial, National Under-23 Road Championships
4th Road race, UEC European Under-23 Road Championships
2011
7th Overall Tour de Bretagne Féminin
7th Overall Tour Cycliste Féminin International de l'Ardèche
10th Road race, UCI Road World Championships
2012
2nd Time trial, National Under-23 Road Championships
3rd Overall Tour de Bretagne Féminin
4th Time trial, National Road Championships
4th Halle-Buizingen
7th Time trial, UEC European Under-23 Road Championships
7th Cholet Pays de Loire Dames
10th Road race, Olympic Games
2013
3rd Road race, Jeux de la Francophonie
National Road Championships

3rd Road race
3rd Under-23 time trial

UEC European Under-23 Road Championships

4th Time trial
9th Road race

10th Overall Giro della Toscana Int. Femminile – Memorial Michela Fanini

1st Stage 4

10th Cholet Pays de Loire Dames
2014
3rd Time trial, National Road Championships
3rd Overall La Route de France
4th Overall Tour de Bretagne Féminin
4th Grand Prix de Plumelec-Morbihan Dames
6th Grand Prix de Dottignies
2015
2nd Time trial, National Road Championships
6th Overall Tour de Bretagne Féminin
7th Overall Trophée d'Or Féminin
8th Chrono Champenois
10th La Classique Morbihan
2016
10th Chrono des Nations
2017
3rd Time trial, National Road Championships
2018
1st Road race, National Road Championships
2nd Overall Belgium Tour

1st Prologue

6th Overall Ladies Tour of Norway
2019
3rd Road race, National Road Championships
7th Omloop Het Nieuwsblad
2020
3rd Time trial, National Road Championships
6th Le Samyn des Dames
10th Omloop Het Nieuwsblad
2021
5th Overall The Women's Tour
2023
8th Omloop van het Hageland
