= 2014 Cholet Pays de Loire Dames =

Race details
- Dates: 23 March 2014
- Stages: 1
- Distance: 116 km (72.08 mi)
- Winning time: 3h 02' 13"

Results
	Winner	Emma Johansson (SWE)	(Sweden national team)
	Second	Jolien D'Hoore (BEL)	(Lotto–Belisol Ladies)
	Third	Elisa Longo Borghini (ITA)	(Hitec Products UCK)

The 2014 Cholet Pays de Loire Dames was the 11th edition of a one-day women's cycle race held in Cholet, France on 23 March 2014. The race has an UCI rating of 1.2. The race was won by the Swedish rider Emma Johansson riding for a Swedish national selection team.

== Results ==
	Rider	Team	Time
1	Emma Johansson (SWE)	Sweden (national team)	3h 02' 13"
2	Jolien D'Hoore (BEL)	Lotto–Belisol Ladies	s.t.
3	Elisa Longo Borghini (ITA)	Hitec Products UCK	s.t.
4	Liesbet De Vocht (BEL)	Lotto–Belisol Ladies	s.t.
5	Audrey Cordon (FRA)	Hitec Products UCK	+ 4"
6	Sara Mustonen (SWE)	Sweden (national team)	+ 4"
7	Megan Guarnier (USA)	USA (national team)	+ 6"
8	Irene San Sebastián (SPA)	Bizkaia–Durango	+ 25"
9	Amélie Rivat (FRA)	Vienne Futuroscope	+ 26"
10	Eugénie Duval (FRA)	CR Normandie	+ 1' 22"

== See also ==
- 2014 in women's road cycling
