= Chantal N'Guten =

French cyclist

Personal information
- Born: France

Cycling career
- Sport: Cycling
- Role: Rider

Chantal N'Guten is a former French racing cyclist. She won the French national road race title in 1968.
