= 2015 Cholet Pays de Loire Dames =

Race details
- Dates: 22 March 2015
- Stages: 1
- Distance: 116 km (72.08 mi)

Results
	Winner	Audrey Cordon (FRA)	(Wiggle–Honda)
	Second	Amélie Rivat (FRA)	(Poitou-Charentes.Futuroscope.86)
	Third	Miriam Bjørnsrud (NOR)	(Team Hitec Products)

The 2015 Cholet Pays de Loire Dames was the 12th edition of the Cholet Pays de Loire Dames, a one-day women's cycle race held in Cholet, France. The event took place on 22 March 2015 and was classified as a UCI-rated 1.2 race.

== Results ==
Result
Rank	Rider	Team	Time
1	Audrey Cordon (FRA)	Wiggle–Honda	3h 06' 47"
2	Amélie Rivat (FRA)	Poitou-Charentes.Futuroscope.86	+ 0"
3	Miriam Bjørnsrud (NOR)	Team Hitec Products	+ 4"
4	Jolien D'Hoore (BEL)	Wiggle–Honda	+ 22"
5	Pascale Jeuland (FRA)	Poitou-Charentes.Futuroscope.86	+ 22"
6	Iris Sachet (FRA)	DN-Pays de la Loire	+ 22"
7	Sheyla Gutiérrez (ESP)	Lointek	+ 22"
8	Molly Weaver (GBR)	Matrix Fitness Pro Cycling	+ 22"
9	Annelies Dom (BEL)	Belgium (national team)	+ 22"
10	Lieselot Decroix (BEL)	Lotto–Soudal Ladies	+ 22"

== See also ==
- 2015 in women's road cycling
