= Andrée Flageolet =

French cyclist

Personal information
- Born: France

Cycling career
- Sport: Cycling
- Role: Rider

Andrée Flageolet is a former French racing cyclist. She won the French national road race title in 1961.
