= Pascal Dubois =

Personal information
- Born: 27 October 1962 (age 63) Amboise, France

Cycling career
- Sport: Cycling
- Current team: Retired
- Discipline: Road
- Role: Rider

Professional teams
- 1986–1987: La Vie Claire
- 1988–1989: Système U–Gitane
- 1990: Castorama

Pascal Dubois (born 27 October 1962) is a French former road cyclist, who was a professional from 1986 to 1990.

== Major results ==
1985
1st Overall Trois Jours de Cherbourg

1st Stage 4

1st Paris–Connerré
1st Stage 5 Tour d'Algérie
2nd Grand Prix des Marbriers
4th Paris–Roubaix Espoirs
1986
8th Paris–Brussels
1987
10th Overall Circuit Cycliste Sarthe
1988
1st Stage 1 Tour du Poitou Charentes et de la Vienne
5th GP de la Ville de Rennes
1989
3rd Paris–Camembert
7th Trofeo Laigueglia
1990
2nd Road race, National Road Championships
