= Julie Krasniak =

French cyclist (born 1988)

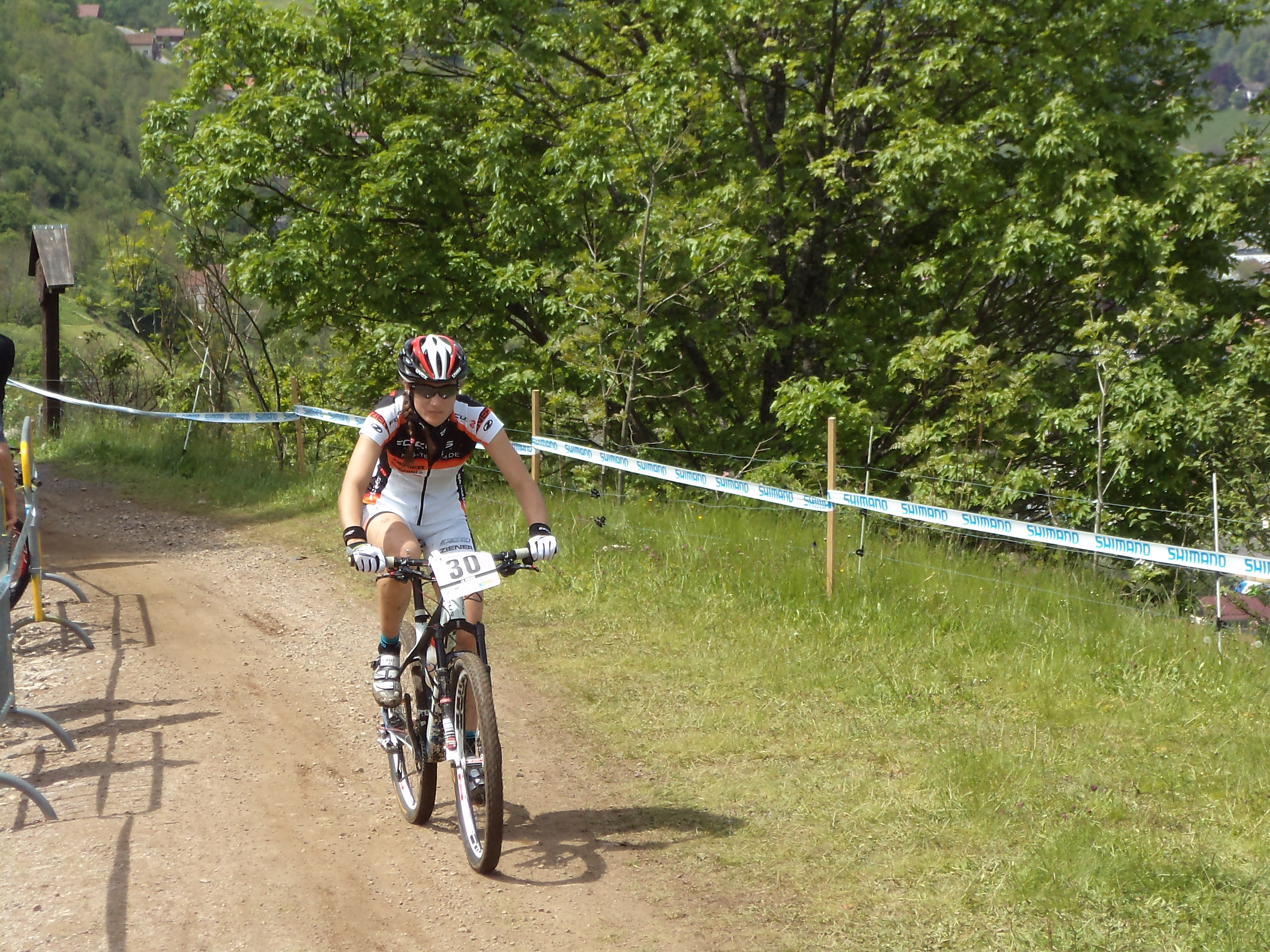
- Krasniak in 2012

Personal information
- Born: 5 June 1988 (age 38) Semécourt, France

Cycling career
- Sport: Cycling
- Role: Rider

Julie Krasniak (born 5 June 1988) is a French racing cyclist. She finished in second place at the French national road race in 2012.
