= Annick Chapron =

French cyclist

Personal information
- Born: 10 March 1949 (age 77) Plessala, France

Cycling career
- Sport: Cycling
- Role: Rider

Annick Chapron (born 10 March 1949) is a former French racing cyclist. She won the French national road race title in 1971.
