= Nicolas Hartmann =

French cyclist

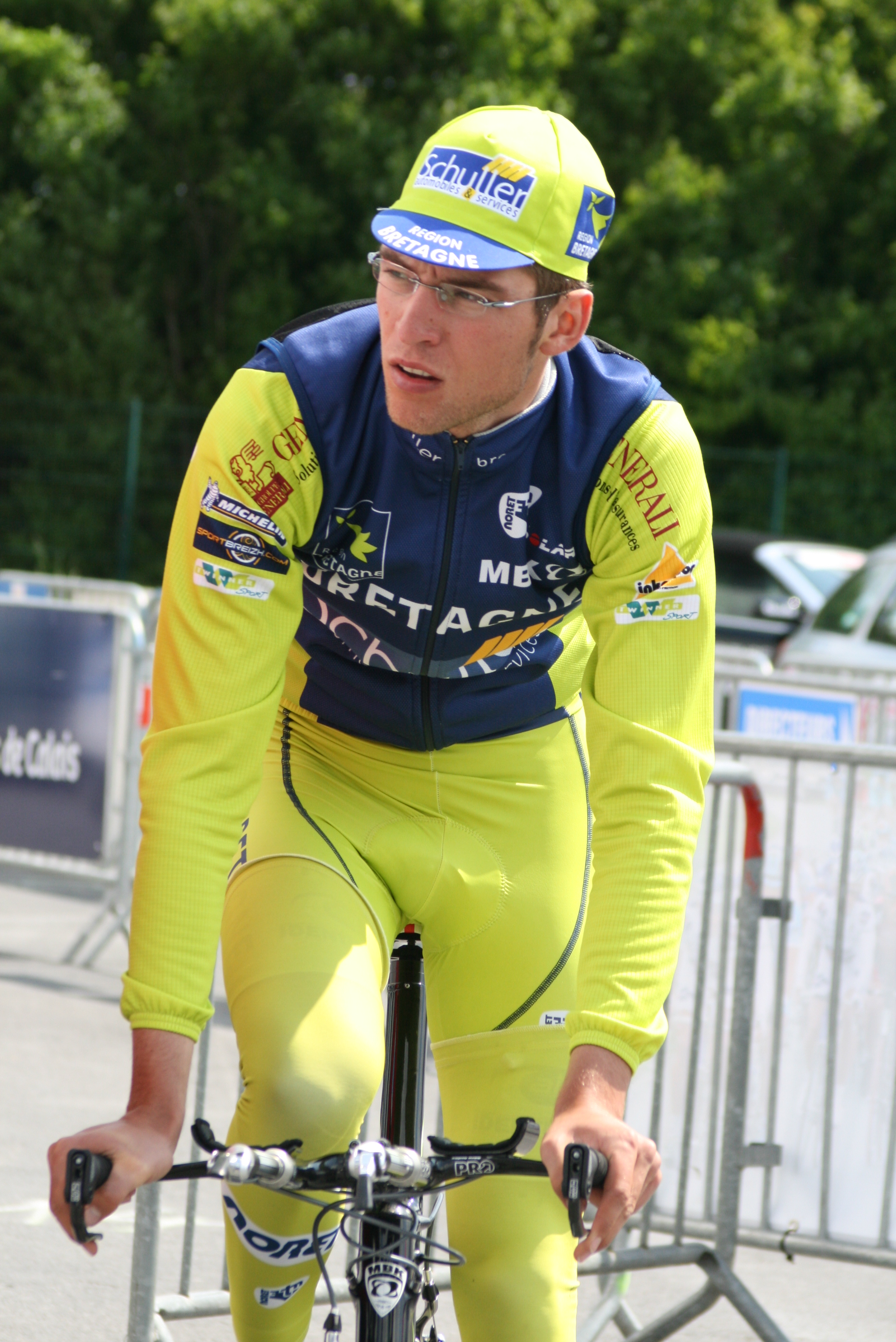

Personal information
- Full name: Nicolas Hartmann
- Born: 3 March 1985 (age 41) Altkirch, France
- Height: 1.90 m (6 ft 3 in)
- Weight: 69 kg (152 lb)

Cycling career
- Sport: Cycling
- Current team: Retired
- Discipline: Road
- Role: Rider

Amateur teams
- 2003–2006: CC Étupes
- 2010: VC Caladois

Professional teams
- 2007–2008: Cofidis
- 2009: Bretagne–Schuller

Nicolas Hartmann (born 3 March 1985 in Altkirch) is a French former professional road bicycle racer.

== Major results ==
2003
3rd Road race, National Junior Road Championships
2006
2nd Overall Tour des Pays de Savoie

1st Stage 1

3rd Tour du Jura
2007
1st Stage 8 Tour de l'Avenir
8th Polynormande
9th Overall Route du Sud
10th Grand Prix de la Somme
2008
5th Paris–Bourges
7th Polynormande
10th Overall Route du Sud
2009
6th Paris–Troyes
