= Lydia Brein-Haritonides =

French cyclist

Personal information
- Born: France

Cycling career
- Sport: Cycling
- Role: Rider

Lydia Brein-Haritonides is a former French racing cyclist. She won the French national road race title in 1955.
