= Guillaume Thévenot =

French cyclist

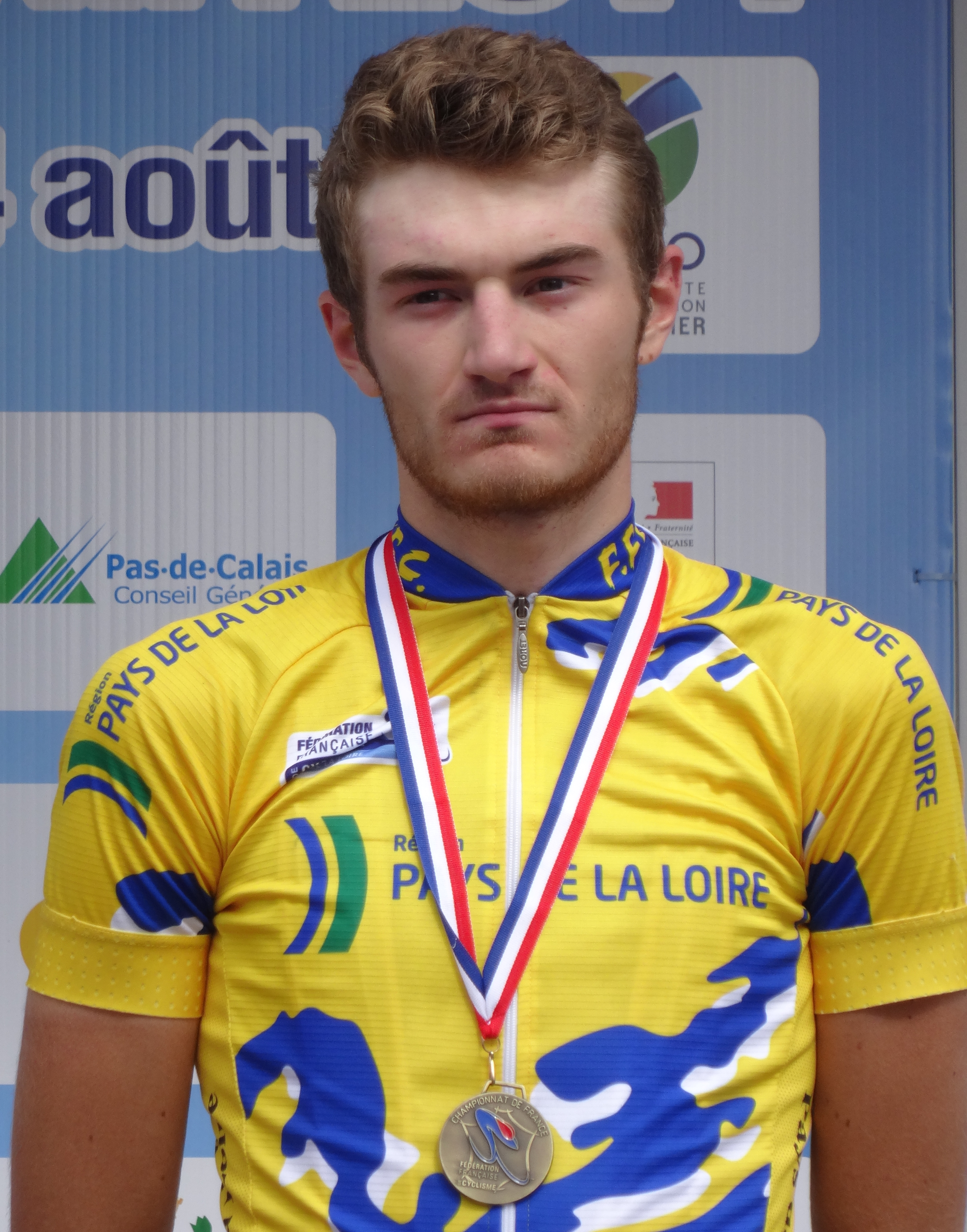
- Thévenot at the 2014 French National Under-23 Road Race Championships

Personal information
- Full name: Guillaume Thévenot
- Born: 13 September 1993 (age 33) La Garenne-Colombes, France
- Height: 1.89 m (6 ft 2 in)
- Weight: 69 kg (152 lb)

Cycling career
- Sport: Cycling
- Current team: CC Nogent-sur-Oise
- Discipline: Road
- Role: Rider

Amateur teams
- 2009: PAC 95
- 2010–2011: EC Château d'Olonne
- 2012–2014: Vendée U
- 2017–: CC Nogent-sur-Oise

Professional team
- 2015–2016: Team Europcar

Guillaume Thevenot (French: [ɡijom tevəno]; born 13 September 1993 in La Garenne-Colombes) is a French cyclist riding for the CC Nogent-sur-Oise amateur team in France.

== Major results ==
2011
2nd Chrono des Nations Juniors
2013
3rd National Under-23 Road Race Championships
7th Polynormande
2014
1st Stage 4 (TTT) Ronde de l'Isard
3rd National Under-23 Road Race Championships
