= Roger Bisseron =

French cyclist

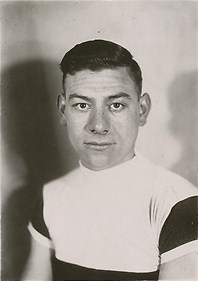
- Bisseron in 1928

Personal information
- Full name: Roger Bisseron
- Born: 27 August 1905 Hallignicourt, France
- Died: 28 June 1992 (aged 86) Évreux, France

Cycling career
- Sport: Cycling
- Role: Rider

Roger Bisseron (27 August 1905 – 28 June 1992) was a French racing cyclist. He won the French national road race title in 1930.
