= Kilian Patour =

French cyclist

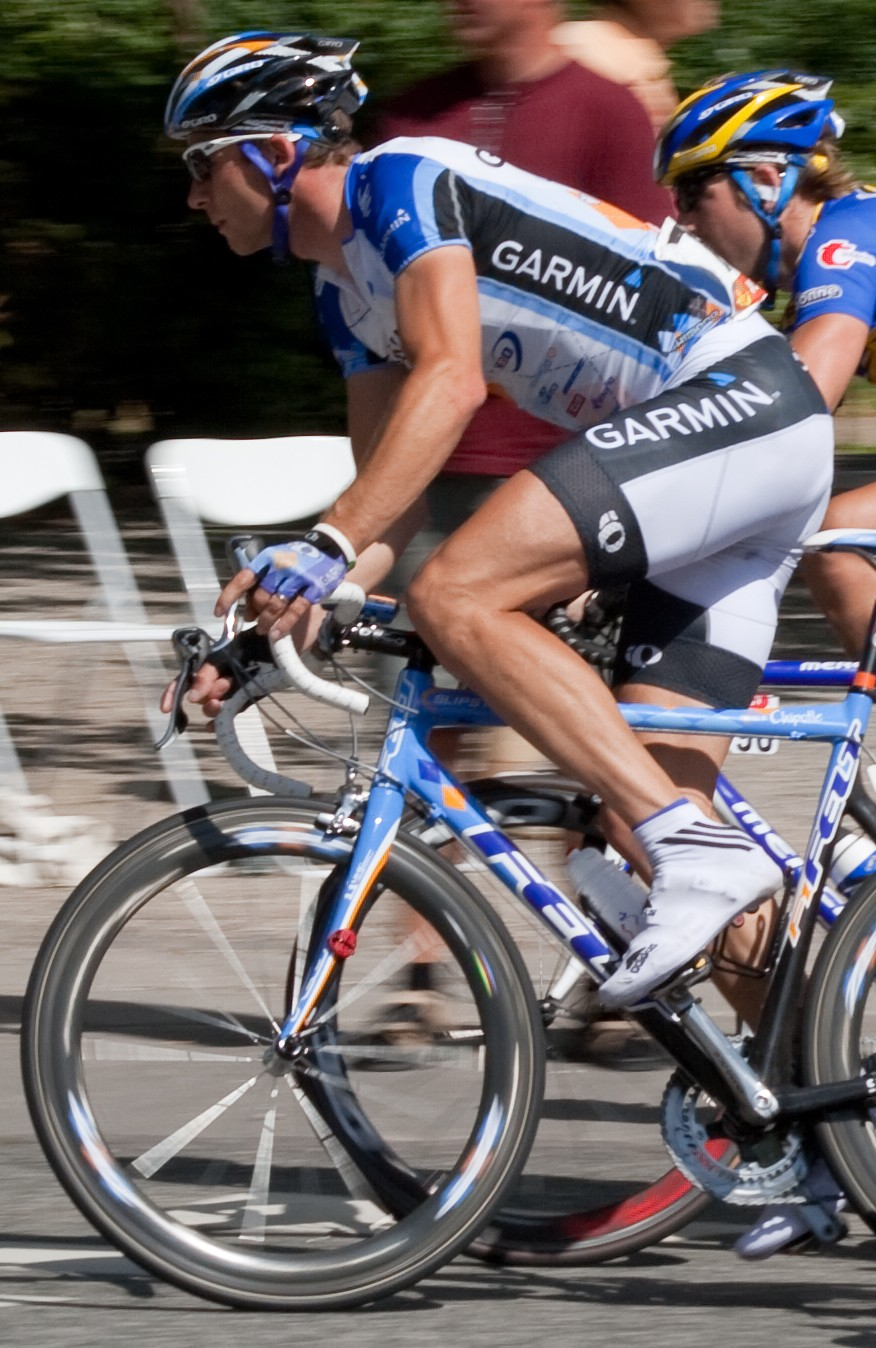

Personal information
- Born: 20 September 1982 (age 44) Saintes, France

Cycling career
- Sport: Cycling
- Current team: UC Orléans
- Discipline: Road
- Role: Rider

Amateur teams
- 2000-2001: Cercle Gambetta Orléans
- 2002-2004: Crédit Agricole Espoirs
- 2010-: UC Orléans

Professional teams
- 2005-2006: Crédit Agricole
- 2007-2009: Slipstream Chipotle

Kilian Patour (born 20 September 1982) is a French cyclist riding for UC Orléans.

== Palmares ==
2000
Junior National Road Race Champion
2003
U23 National Road Race Champion
1st stage 4 Tour de la Manche
1st Brussels-Zepperen
2nd Paris–Troyes
2004
1st Grand Prix de la Ville de Nogent-sur-Oise
3rd U23 National Time Trial Championships
2009
1st stage 1 Tour of Qatar (TTT)
