= Jeannine Lemaire =

French cyclist

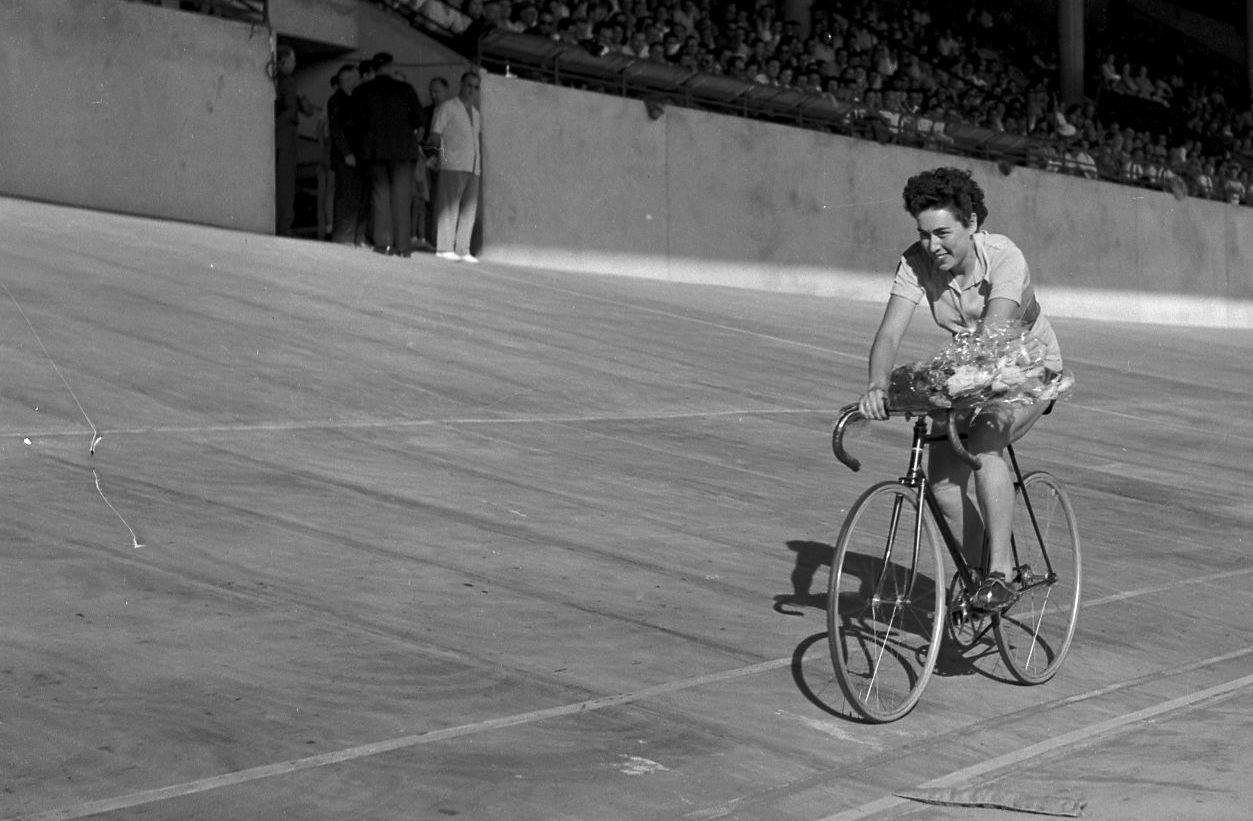
- Jeannine Lemaire in 1950

Personal information
- Born: France

Cycling career
- Sport: Cycling
- Role: Rider

Jeannine Lemaire is a former French racing cyclist. She won the French national road race title in 1952 and 1953.
