= Séverine Desbouys =

French cyclist

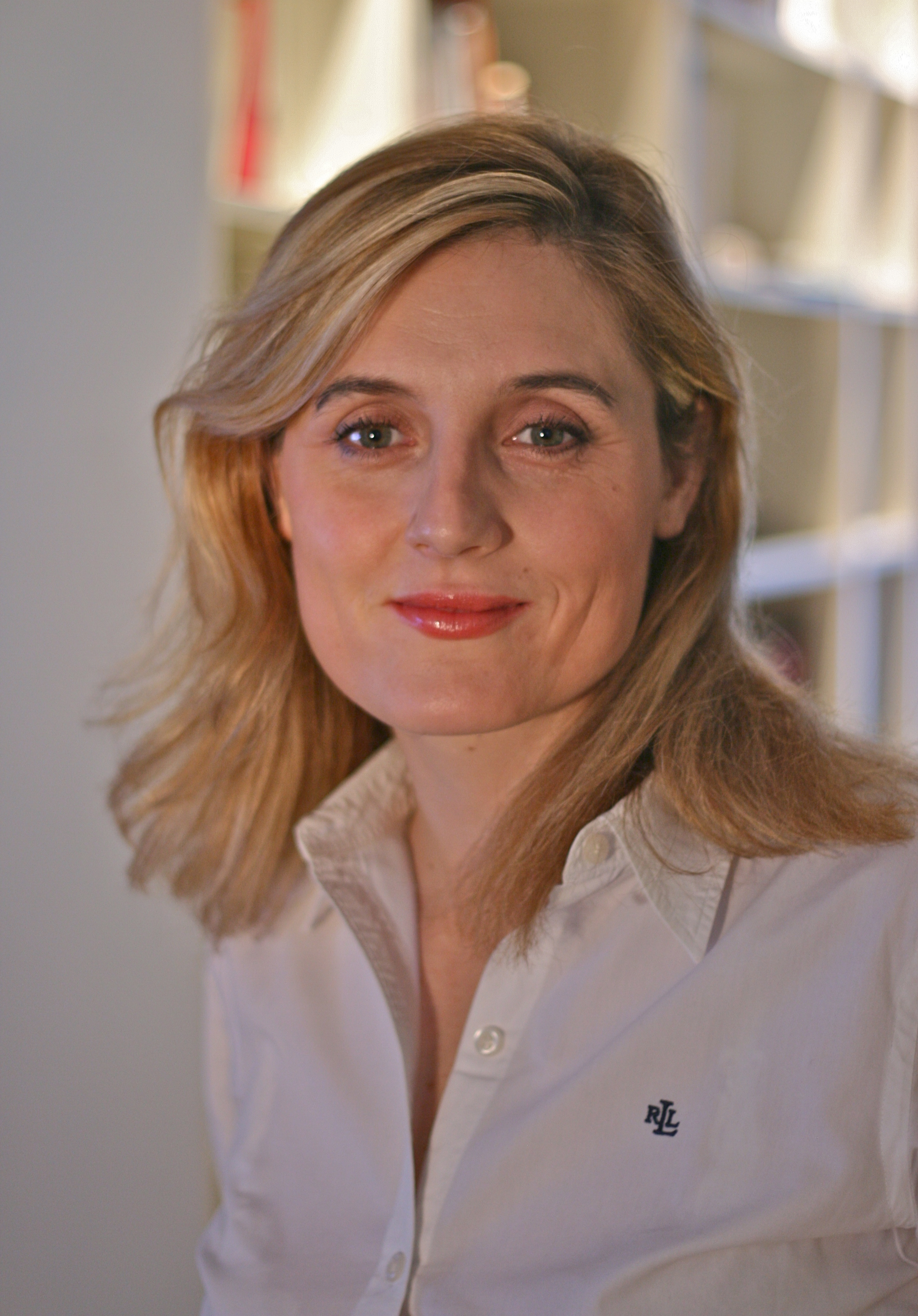
- Desbouys in 2012

Personal information
- Born: 17 August 1974 (age 52) Vichy, France

Cycling career
- Sport: Cycling
- Discipline: Road cycling

Séverine Desbouys (born 17 August 1974, in Vichy) is a road cyclist from France. She represented her nation at the 1998, 1999, 2000 and 2001 UCI Road World Championships.
