= Sylvie Riedle =

French cyclist

Personal information
- Born: 22 February 1969 (age 57) Gorze, France

Cycling career
- Sport: Cycling
- Role: Rider

Sylvie Riedle (22 February 1969) is a former French racing cyclist. She won the French national road race title in 1997.
