= Hudimesnil =

- Commune
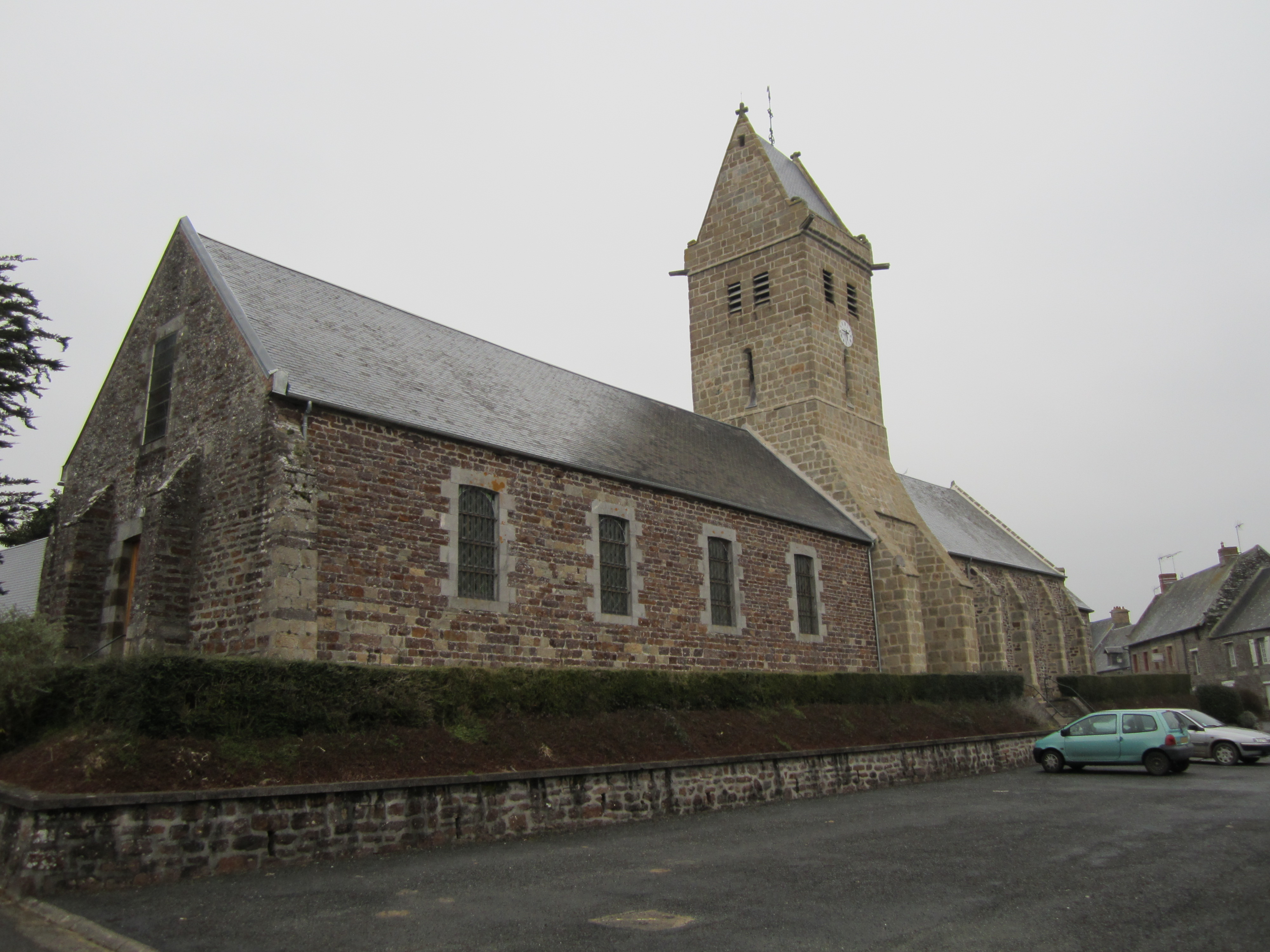
- The church of Notre-Dame
- Location of Hudimesnil
- Location within France Location within Normandy
- Coordinates: 48°51′49″N 1°29′28″W
- Country: France
- Region: Normandy
- Department: Manche
- Arrondissement: Avranches
- Canton: Bréhal
- Intercommunality: Granville, Terre et Mer

Government
  - Mayor (2020–2026): Michel Mesnage
- Area^{1}: 18.68 km^{2} (7.21 sq mi)
- Elevation: 107 m (351 ft)
- Highest elevation: 117 m (384 ft)
- Lowest elevation: 28 m (92 ft)
- Population (2023): 928
  - Density: 49.7/km^{2} (129/sq mi)
- Time zone: UTC+01:00 (CET)
  - Summer (DST): UTC+02:00 (CEST)
- INSEE/Postal code: 50252 /50510
- ^{1} French Land Register data, which excludes lakes, ponds, glaciers > 1 km^{2} (0.386 sq mi or 247 acres) and river estuaries.

Hudimesnil (French pronunciation: [ydimenil]) is a commune in the Manche department in north-western France.

== See also ==
- Communes of the Manche department
