= 2013 Cholet Pays de Loire Dames =

Race details
- Dates: 17 March 2013
- Distance: 116 km (72.08 mi)

Results
	Winner	Emma Johansson (SWE)	(Orica–AIS)
	Second	Audrey Cordon (FRA)	(Vienne Futuroscope)
	Third	Jolien D'Hoore (BEL)	(Lotto Belisol Ladies)

The 2013 Cholet Pays de Loire Dames was the 10th edition of a one-day women's cycle race held in Cholet, France on March 17 2013. The tour has an UCI rating of 1.2. The race was won by Emma Johansson of the Australian-based team, Orica–AIS.

Result

	Rider	Team	Time
1	Emma Johansson (SWE)	Orica–AIS	3h 39' 56"
2	Audrey Cordon (FRA)	Vienne Futuroscope	+ 3"
3	Jolien D'Hoore (BEL)	Lotto Belisol Ladies	+ 10"
4	Fanny Riberot (FRA)	Lointek	+ 10"
5	Shelley Olds (USA)	Team TIBCO	+ 10"
6	Jessy Druyts (BEL)	Topsport Vlaanderen — Bioracer	+ 10"
7	Pascale Jeuland (USA)	Vienne Futuroscope	+ 10"
8	Sofie De Vuyst (BEL)	Sengers Ladies Cycling Team	+ 10"
9	Manon Souyris (FRA)	Vienne Futuroscope	+ 10"
10	Aude Biannic (FRA)	S.C. Michela Fanini Rox	+ 10"

== See also ==
- 2013 in women's road cycling
