= Dominique Damiani =

French cyclist (1953–2019)

Personal information
- Born: 12 July 1953
- Died: 17 September 2019 (aged 66)

Cycling career
- Sport: Cycling

Dominique Damiani (12 July 1953 – 17 September 2019) was a French cyclist. She competed in the women's road race event at the 1984 Summer Olympics.
