= Magali Le Floc'h =

French cyclist

Personal information
- Born: 17 August 1975 (age 51) Meaux, France

Cycling career
- Sport: Cycling
- Role: Rider

Magali Le Floc'h (born 17 August 1975) is a former French racing cyclist. She won the French national road race title in 2002 and 2005. She also competed in the women's road race at the 2000 Summer Olympics.
