= André Raynaud =

French cyclist (1904–1937)

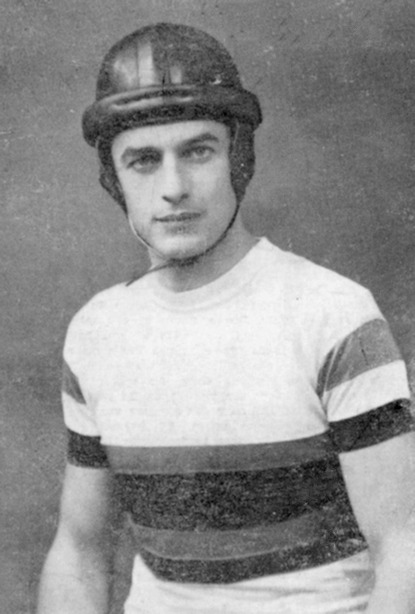

Personal information
- Born: 10 November 1904 Cieux, France
- Died: 20 March 1937 (aged 32) Antwerp, Belgium

Sport
- Sport: Cycling
Medal record
Representing France
UCI Motor-paced World Championships
Gold medal – first place	1936 Zurich	Professionals

André Raynaud (10 November 1904 – 20 March 1937) was a French cyclist. After winning two six-day road races, in Paris in 1929 and in Marseille in 1930, he focused on motor-paced racing and won the national championships and UCI Motor-paced World Championships in 1936.

His bike failed during a motor-paced race at the Sportpaleis in Antwerp on 20 March 1937. He was hit by a nearby motorcycle and died upon impact. His wife died 4 years earlier.
