= Josiane Bost =

French cyclist

Personal information
- Full name: Josiane Bost
- Born: 7 April 1956 (age 70) Tournus, France

Cycling career
- Sport: Cycling
- Disciplines: Road and track
- Role: Rider
Medal record
Representing France
Women's Road bicycle racing
World Championships
Gold medal – first place	1977 San Cristóbal	Road race

Josiane Bost (born 7 April 1956, in Tournus, France) is a French former racing cyclist who was world road champion in 1977. She twice won the National Pursuit Championship and once the National Sprint Championship.

== Biography ==
Josiane Bost was one of the best female racing cyclists in France in the 1970s. She won the world championship in 1977 and three national championships on the track, including the unusual combination of pursuit and sprint titles. She and Geneviève Gambillon, her main rival, bridged the gap in French cycling between Lily Herse and Jeannie Longo.

Bost came second three times in the national road championship, beaten each time by Gambillon. She was French pursuit champion in 1977 and 1978 and sprint champion in 1978. In 1977, she beat the American, Connie Carpenter, in the world road championship at San Cristóbal.

== Road palmarès ==
1972

2nd national road championship

1975

2nd national road championship

1976

3rd national road championship

1977

World road championship

2nd national road championship

== Track palmarès ==
National pursuit champion 1977 and 1978 (second in 1975 and 1976)

National sprint champion 1978 (second in 1977 and third in 1976)

== General references ==
- Jean Danzé, Louis Bouteculet: De Louis Gauthier à Josiane Bost, cinquante ans de cyclisme montcellin (1998)
