= Tour du Limousin =

French bicycle race

Race details
- Date: Mid-Late August
- Region: Limousin, France
- English name: Tour of Limousin
- Local name: Tour du Limousin (in French)
- Discipline: Road
- Competition: UCI Europe Tour
- Type: Stage-race
- Web site: www.tourdulimousin.com

History
- First edition: 1968
- Editions: 59 (as of 2026)
- First winner: Pierre Martelozzo (FRA)
- Most wins: Francis Duteil (FRA); Charly Mottet (FRA); Patrice Halgand (FRA); Bernard Hinault (FRA); Pierrick Fédrigo (FRA); Ewen Costiou (FRA) (2 wins)
- Most recent: Ewen Costiou (FRA)

Tour du Limousin is a 4-day road bicycle race held annually in Limousin, France. It was first held in 1968 and since 2005 it has been organised as a 2.1 event on the UCI Europe Tour. In 2011 it was upgraded to an 2.HC event, and downgraded to 2.1 since 2013. Between 1968 and 1974 it was an amateur race.

== Winners ==
Year	Country	Rider	Team
1968	France	Pierre Martelozzo	
1969	France	Paul Gutty	Tigra
1970	France	Francis Duteil	
1971	France	François Dubreuil	
1972	Soviet Union	Juri Dimitriev	
1973	France	François Dubreuil	
1974	Poland	Ryszard Szurkowski	
1975	France	Francis Campaner	Sporting Clube de Portugal
1976	France	Bernard Hinault	Gitane–Campagnolo
1977	France	Bernard Hinault	Gitane–Campagnolo
1978	France	Gilbert Chaumaz	
1979	France	Bernard Vallet	La Redoute
1980	France	René Bittinger	Miko–Mercier–Vivagel
1981	France	Marc Madiot	Renault–Elf–Gitane
1982	France	Eric Salomon	
1983	France	Dominique Arnaud	Wolber
1984	Denmark	Kim Andersen	COOP–Hoonved
1985	France	Thierry Marie	Renault–Elf
1986	France	Dominique Gaigne	Système U
1987	France	Charly Mottet	Système U
1988	France	Jean-Marc Manfrin	
1989	France	Thierry Claveyrolat	RMO
1990	France	Martial Gayant	Toshiba
1991	Belgium	Michel Vermote	RMO
1992	France	Éric Boyer	Z
1993	France	Charly Mottet	Novemail–Histor–Laser Computer
1994	Germany	Jens Heppner	Team Telekom
1995	Ukraine	Andrei Tchmil	Lotto–Isoglass
1996	France	Laurent Brochard	Festina–Lotus
1997	Estonia	Lauri Aus	Casino
1998	France	Vincent Cali	Casino–Ag2r
1999	France	Stéphane Heulot	Française des Jeux
2000	France	Patrice Halgand	Jean Delatour
2001	France	Franck Bouyer	Bonjour
2002	France	Patrice Halgand	Jean Delatour
2003	Italy	Massimiliano Lelli	Cofidis
2004	France	Pierrick Fédrigo	Crédit Agricole
2005	France	Sébastien Joly	Crédit Agricole
2006	Colombia	Leonardo Duque	Cofidis
2007	France	Pierrick Fédrigo	Bouygues Télécom
2008	France	Sébastien Hinault	Crédit Agricole
2009	France	Mathieu Perget	Caisse d'Epargne
2010	Sweden	Gustav Larsson	Team Saxo Bank
2011	Belgium	Björn Leukemans	Vacansoleil–DCM
2012	Japan	Yukiya Arashiro	Team Europcar
2013	Switzerland	Martin Elmiger	IAM Cycling
2014	Italy	Mauro Finetto	Neri Sottoli
2015	Italy	Sonny Colbrelli	Bardiani–CSF
2016	United States	Joey Rosskopf	BMC Racing Team
2017	France	Alexis Vuillermoz	AG2R La Mondiale
2018	France	Nicolas Edet	Cofidis
2019	France	Benoît Cosnefroy	AG2R La Mondiale
2020	Italy	Luca Wackermann	Vini Zabù–KTM
2021	France	Warren Barguil	Arkéa–Samsic
2022	Spain	Alex Aranburu	Movistar Team
2023	France	Romain Grégoire	Groupama–FDJ
2024	France	Alex Baudin	Decathlon–AG2R La Mondiale
2025	France	Ewen Costiou	Arkéa–B&B Hotels
2026	France	Ewen Costiou	Groupama–FDJ United
