= Daniel Amardeilh =

French cyclist

Personal information
- Born: 22 July 1959 (age 67) Saint-Victor-Rouzaud, France

Cycling career
- Sport: Cycling

Daniel Amardeilh (born 22 July 1959) is a French former cyclist. He competed in the individual road race event at the 1984 Summer Olympics.
