= Christel Ferrier-Bruneau =

French cyclist

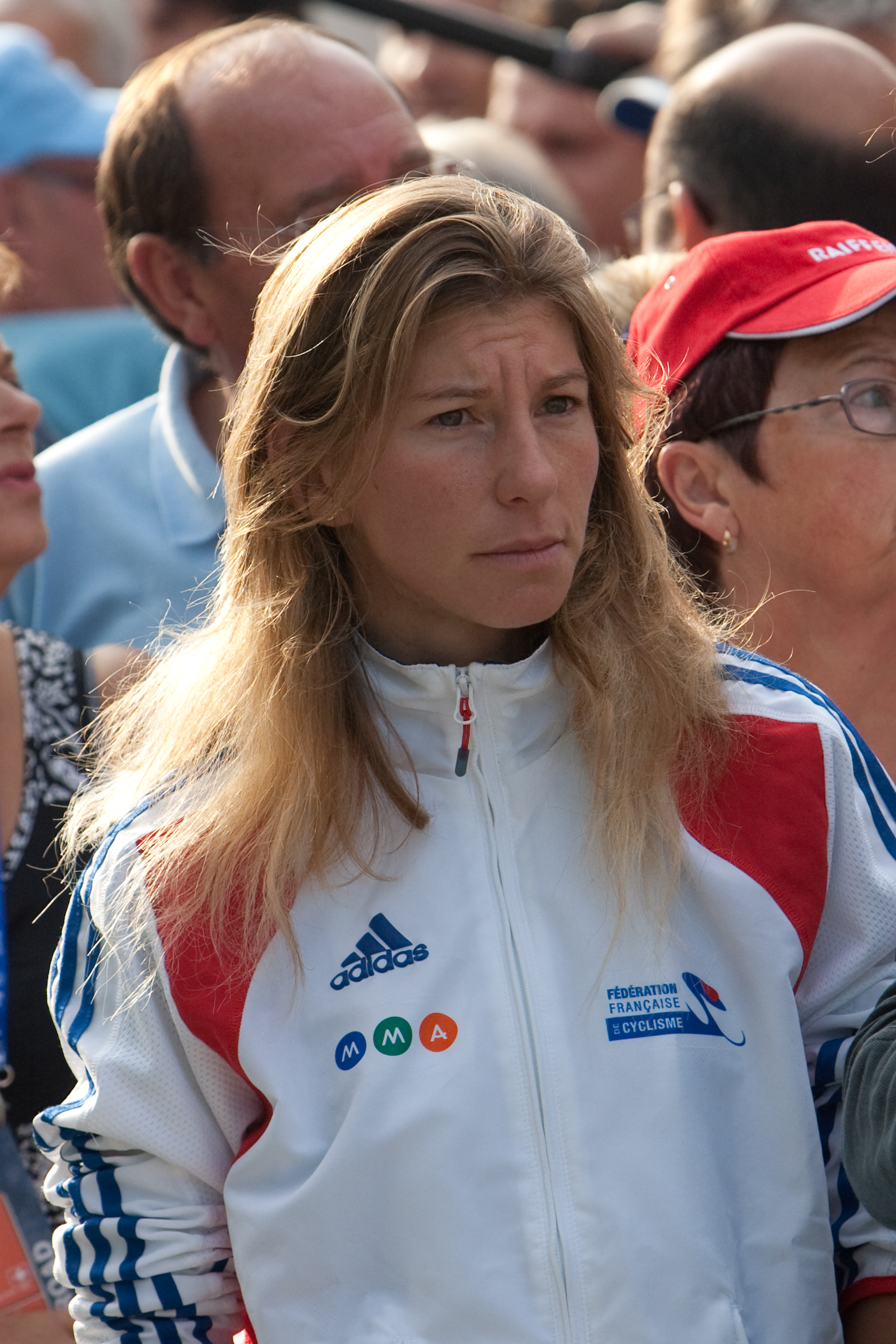
- Ferrier-Bruneau in 2009

Personal information
- Born: 8 July 1979 (age 47) Montpellier, France

Cycling career
- Sport: Cycling
- Current team: Emotional.fr–Tornatech–GSC Blagnac
- Role: Rider

Amateur teams
- 2007: Les Pruneaux D'Agen
- 2008: Team Lot et Garonne
- 2008-2009: Scott Valloire Galibier

Professional teams
- 2009: Vision1 Racing
- 2010: Vienne Futuroscope
- 2011: Gauss
- 2012: Hitec Products–Mistral Home
- 2013: Faren–Let's Go Finland
- 2017-: SAS–Macogep

Christel Ferrier-Bruneau (born 8 July 1979) is a French racing cyclist. She competed in the women's road race at the 2008 Summer Olympics and the 2013 UCI women's road race in Florence.
