= Sophie Creux =

French cyclist

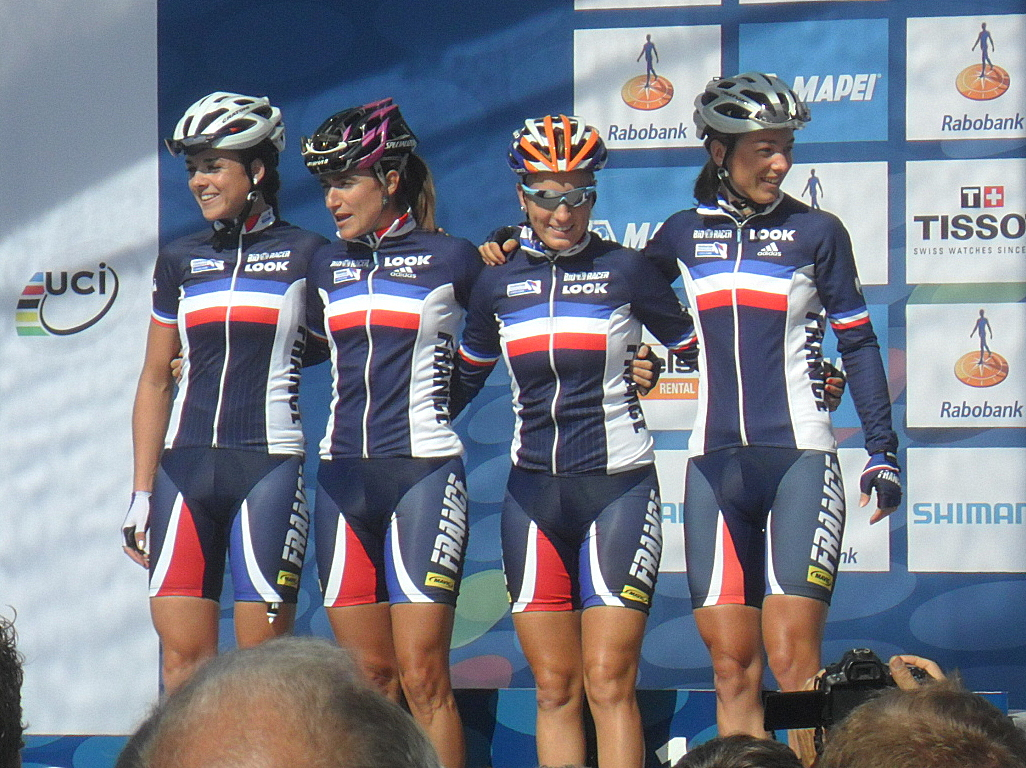
- Sophie Creux (black helmet) at the 2012 UCI Road World Championships

Personal information
- Born: 8 July 1981 (age 45) France

Cycling career
- Sport: Cycling
- Discipline: Road cycling

Professional team
- 2011: Vienne Futuroscope(trainee)

Sophie Creux (born 8 July 1981) is a road cyclist from France. She participated at the 2012 UCI Road World Championships.

== Major results ==
2009
5th Omloop Het Nieuwsblad

2010
9th Omloop Het Nieuwsblad
