= Amélie Rivat-Mas =

French cyclist

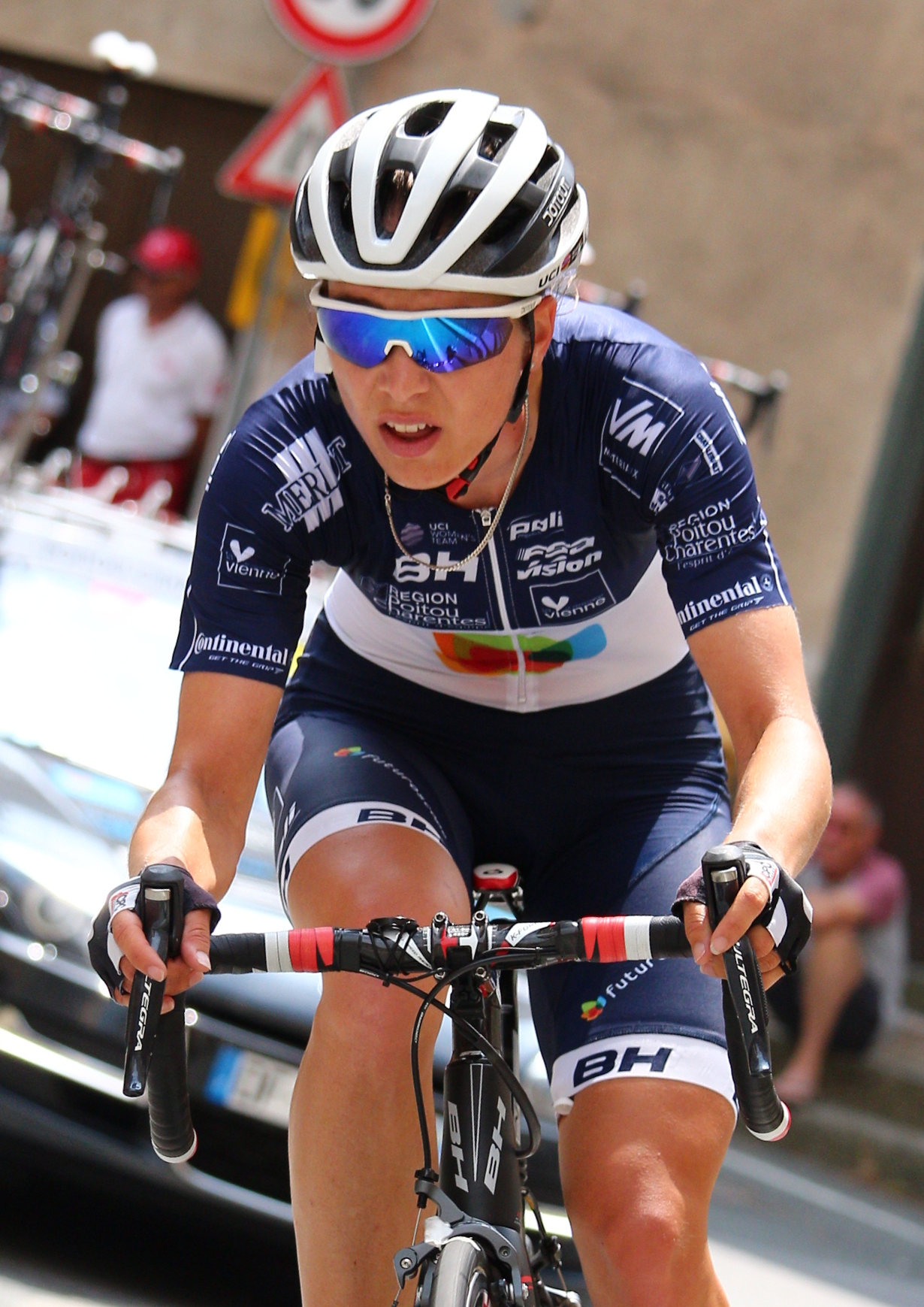
- Rivat-Mas during the 2016 Giro d'Italia Femminile

Personal information
- Full name: Amélie Rivat-Mas
- Born: Amélie Rivat; 14 November 1989 (age 36) Lyon, France

Cycling career
- Sport: Cycling
- Current team: Retired
- Discipline: Road
- Role: Rider

Professional teams
- 2012–2016: Vienne Futuroscope
- 2017: Lares–Waowdeals

Amélie Rivat-Mas (née Rivat; born 14 November 1989) is a French retired racing cyclist. She finished second in the French National Road Race Championships in 2010, 2013, and 2017.

== Major results ==
2010
2nd Road race, National Road Championships
2011
2nd Road race, National Under-23 Road Championships
4th Road race, UEC European Under-23 Road Championships
2013
2nd Road race, National Road Championships
5th Road race, Jeux de la Francophonie
2014
6th Overall Tour Cycliste Féminin International de l'Ardèche
8th Grand Prix de Plumelec-Morbihan Dames
9th Cholet Pays de Loire Dames
2015
2nd Cholet Pays de Loire Dames
3rd Road race, National Road Championships
8th La Classique Morbihan
9th Grand Prix de Plumelec-Morbihan Dames
10th Overall Tour de Bretagne Féminin

1st Mountains classification

2016
3rd La Classique Morbihan
8th Grand Prix de Plumelec-Morbihan Dames
10th Overall La Route de France
2017
2nd Road race, National Road Championships
