= Élodie Touffet =

French cyclist

Personal information
- Born: 17 February 1980 (age 46) France

Cycling career
- Sport: Cycling
- Discipline: Road cycling

Professional teams
- 2006: Nobili Rubinetterie-Menikini-Cogeas
- 2007: Menikini-Selle Italia-Gysko
- 2008: Gauss Rdz Ormu
- 2009: Cervelo Test Team

Élodie Touffet (born 17 February 1980) is a road cyclist from France. She represented France at the 2005, 2007 and 2008 UCI Road World Championships. She also represented Tahiti at the 2022 Championships in Australia, as part of the mixed relay team, where Tahiti had an invitation to participate in the event.
