= Francis Duteil =

French cyclist (1947–2016)

Personal information
- Born: 25 March 1947 Angoulême, France
- Died: 9 October 2016 (aged 69)

Cycling career
- Sport: Cycling

Francis Duteil (25 March 1947 – 9 October 2016) was a French cyclist. He competed in the individual road race event at the 1976 Summer Olympics. Duteil won the 1970 Tour du Limousin.
