= Magali Mocquery =

French cyclist

Personal information
- Born: 20 September 1983 (age 43) Sallanches, France

Cycling career
- Sport: Cycling
- Discipline: Road cycling

Professional teams
- 2006–2007: Team Pro Feminin Du Genevois
- 2009–2010: Vienne Futuroscope

Magali Mocquery (born 20 September 1983) is a road cyclist from France. She represented her nation at the 2007 UCI Road World Championships.
