= List of wins by Team Bigla and its successors =

This is a comprehensive list of victories of the Équipe Paule Ka cycling team. The races are categorized according to the UCI rules.

== 2005 – Team Bigla ==
Kazakhstan National Time Trial Championship, Zoulfia Zabirova
Kazakhstan National Road Race Championship, Zoulfia Zabirova
Overall Giro d'Italia Femminile, Nicole Brändli

Prologue, Stages 1 & 7, Nicole Brändli

Prologue Giro di San Marino, Zoulfia Zabirova
GP di San Marino, Zoulfia Zabirova

== 2006 – Bigla Cycling Team ==
Berner Rundfahrt, Zoulfia Zabirova
Rund um den Bühler, Bettina Kühn
Diessenhofen, Bettina Kühn
Thun, Monika Furrer
Parel van de Veluwel, Monica Holler
Stage 3 Giro del Trentino Alto Adige-Südtirol, Andrea Grau
Stage 1 Giro d'Italia Femminile, Nicole Brändli
Stage 2 Route de France Féminine, Noemi Cantele
Overall Trophée d'Or Féminin, Zoulfia Zabirova

Stage 1, Zoulfia Zabirova
Stage 6, Noemi Cantele

GP de Plouay – Bretagne, Nicole Brändli
Hammarö Rundan, Monica Holler
Stages 2a, 4a & 6 Giro della Toscana Int. Femminile, Noemi Cantele
Stage 3 Giro della Toscana Int. Femminile, Nicole Brändli

== 2007 – Bigla Cycling Team ==
Brissago, Noemi Cantele
GP Raiffeisen, Noemi Cantele
Berner Rundfahrt, Jennifer Hohl
Diessenhofen, Andrea Wölfer
Tjejtrampet, Monica Holler
Thun, Bettina Kühn
Overall Laxå 3-dagars, Monica Holler

Stages 1, 2a & 3b, Monica Holler

Wetzikon, Andrea Knecht
Stage 5 Giro d'Italia Femminile, Nicole Brändli
Diessenhofen, Bettina Kühn
Olten, Sereina Trachsel
Södra Hestra Sparbanks GP, Monica Holler
Västboloppet, Monica Holler
Elgg Criterium, Andrea Wölfer
Stage 3 Albstadt, Monica Holler
Overall Trophée d'Or Féminin, Noemi Cantele

Stage 1, Noemi Cantele
Stage 2, Nicole Brändli

GP de Plouay – Bretagne, Noemi Cantele
Horgen, Sereina Trachsel
Union Race Open, Monica Holler
Overall Giro della Toscana Int. Femminile, Noemi Cantele

Stages 2a & 3, Noemi Cantele

== 2008 – Bigla Cycling Team ==
Brissago, Nicole Brändli
Giro del Lago Maggiore — GP Knorr, Nicole Brändli
GP Città di Cornaredo, Andrea Graus
Rund um Schönaich, Veronica Andréasson
GP Costa Etrusca, Noemi Cantele
Diessenhofen, Andrea Wölfer
Berner Rundfahrt, Sereina Trachsel
Leo Wirth Strassenrennen, Nicole Brändli
Cham, Andrea Thürig
Stages 3 & 7 Tour de l'Aude Cycliste Féminin, Zoulfia Zabirova
Thun, Andrea Wölfer
Stage 3 Giro del Trentino Alto Adige-Südtirol, Andrea Thürig
Stage 3 Thüringen-Rundfahrt der Frauen, Noemi Cantele
Olten, Andrea Wölfer
Kirchdorf, Sereina Trachsel
Bern, Sereina Trachsel
Östgötaloppet, Monica Holler
Frenkendorf, Bettina Kühn
Horgen, Sereina Trachsel
Stage 6 Giro della Toscana Int. Femminile, Monica Holler

== 2009 – Bigla Cycling Team ==
Giro del Lago Maggiore — GP Knorr, Noemi Cantele
Brissago, Noemi Cantele
GP de Chambéry le Vieux, Modesta Vžesniauskaitė
GP Raiffeisen, Nicole Brändli
Thun, Bettina Kühn
Emakumen Saria, Noemi Cantele
Stage 5 Giro d'Italia Femminile, Noemi Cantele
Stage 1 Trophée d'Or Féminin, Monica Holler
Meisterschaft von Zürich, Jennifer Hohl
Memorial Davide Fardelli, Karin Thürig
Giornata Rosa di Nove, Noemi Cantele
Stage 1 (TTT) Giro della Toscana Int. Femminile, Bettina Kühn, Noemi Cantele, Monica Holler, Jennifer Hohl, Nicole Brändli & Modesta Vžesniauskaitė

== 2012 – Bigla Cycling Team ==
Berner Rundfahrt, Caroline Baur
Overall Albstadt, Caroline Baur
Diessenhofen, Nicole Hanselmann

== 2013 – Bigla Cycling Team ==
Oberwangen, Emma Pooley
Berner Rundfahrt, Nicole Hanselmann
Luzern, Emma Pooley
Diessenhofen, Désirée Ehrler
Overall Tour Languedoc Roussillon, Emma Pooley

Stage 3, Emma Pooley

Cham, Nicole Hanselmann
Stages 3 & 5 Czech Tour, Emma Pooley

== 2014 – Bigla Cycling Team ==
Wanze Road Race, Joanne Hogan
Stage 3a Energiewacht Tour, Vera Koedooder
GP Osterhas, Jacqueline Hahn
Berner Rundfahrt, Elke Gebhardt
Cham-Hagendorn, Elke Gebhardt
Stage 6 Internationale Thüringen Rundfahrt der Frauen, Elke Gebhardt
Rund um den Born, Désirée Ehrler
Riehen Criterium, Joanne Hogan

== 2015 – Bigla Cycling Team ==
Overall Auensteiner–Radsporttage, Ashleigh Moolman

Stage 3, Ashleigh Moolman

Prologue Emakumeen Euskal Bira, Annemiek van Vleuten
Prologue Giro d'Italia Femminile, Annemiek van Vleuten
Stage 4 Thüringen Rundfahrt der Frauen, Lotta Lepistö
Prologue Giro della Toscana Int. Femminile – Memorial Michela Fanini, Annemiek van Vleuten

== 2016 – Cervélo–Bigla Pro Cycling ==
Prologue Euskal Emakumeen Bira, Lotta Lepistö
Stage 1 Festival Elsy Jacobs, Lotta Lepistö
SwissEver GP Cham – Hagendorn, Lotta Lepistö
Overall Auensteiner–Radsporttage, Ashleigh Moolman

Stage 2b, Ashleigh Moolman

Stage 5 Women's Tour, Lotta Lepistö
White Spot / Delta Road Race, Joëlle Numainville
Stage 1 Ladies Tour of Norway, Nicole Hanselmann
Overall Giro della Toscana Int. Femminile – Memorial Michela Fanini, Ashleigh Moolman

Points classification, Ashleigh Moolman
Prologue & Stage 2, Ashleigh Moolman

== 2017 – Cervélo–Bigla Pro Cycling ==
Overall Setmana Ciclista Valenciana, Cecilie Uttrup Ludwig

Youth classification, Cecilie Uttrup Ludwig

Youth classification Healthy Ageing Tour, Lisa Klein
Dwars Door Vlaanderen, Lotta Lepistö
Gent–Wevelgem, Lotta Lepistö
Prologue Festival Elsy Jacobs, Ashleigh Moolman
Overall Emakumeen Bira, Ashleigh Moolman

Points classification, Ashleigh Moolman
Mountains classification, Ashleigh Moolman

La Classique Morbihan, Ashleigh Moolman
Grand Prix de Plumelec-Morbihan Dames, Ashleigh Moolman
Youth classification Giro d'Italia Femminile, Cecilie Uttrup Ludwig

Stage 6, Lotta Lepistö

Overall Cascade Cycling Classic, Allie Dragoo
Youth classification Ladies Tour of Norway, Lisa Klein
Overall Giro della Toscana Int. Femminile – Memorial Michela Fanini, Ashleigh Moolman

Points classification, Ashleigh Moolman
Mountains classification, Ashleigh Moolman
Youth classification, Cecilie Uttrup Ludwig
Prologue, Lisa Klein
Stage 2, Ashleigh Moolman

Youth classification UCI Women's World Tour, Cecilie Uttrup Ludwig
Telkom 947 Cycle Challenge, Ashleigh Moolman

== 2018 – Cervélo–Bigla Pro Cycling ==
Mountain classification Semana Ciclista Valenciana, Ashleigh Moolman
Provincial Time Trial Championship West-Vlaanderen, Ann-Sophie Duyck
La Classique Morbihan, Ashleigh Moolman
Grand Prix de Plumelec-Morbihan Dames, Ashleigh Moolman
Stage 5 The Women's Tour, Lotta Lepisto
Belgium National Time Trial Championships, Ann-Sophie Duyck
Switzerland National Time Trial Championships, Nicole Hanselmann
Denmark National Time Trial Championships, Cecilie Uttrup Ludwig
Finland National Time Trial Championships, Lotta Lepisto
Finland National Road Race Championships, Lotta Lepisto
Prologue Giro Toscana Int. Femminile – Memorial Michela Fanini, Lotta Lepisto

== 2019 – Bigla Pro Cycling ==
Pan American Championships, Time Trial, Leah Thomas
SwissEver GP Cham-Hagendorn, Julie Leth
Stage 3 (ITT) Tour de Bretagne Féminin, Mikayla Harvey
Stage 8 Giro Rosa, Elizabeth Banks

== 2020 – Bigla–Katusha ==
New Zealand National Road Championship, Niamh Fisher-Black
New Zealand U23 National Road Championship, Niamh Fisher-Black
