= List of FDJ Nouvelle-Aquitaine Futuroscope rosters =

This page lists the rosters, by season, of the UCI Women's Team, FDJ Nouvelle-Aquitaine Futuroscope.

== 2011 ==
Ages as of 1 January 2011.

Rider	Date of birth
Marion Azam (FRA)	October 13, 1991 (aged 19)
Julie Beveridge (CAN)	June 30, 1988 (aged 22)
Karol-Ann Canuel (CAN)	April 18, 1988 (aged 22)
Audrey Cordon Ragot (FRA)	September 22, 1989 (aged 21)
Sophie Creux (FRA)	July 8, 1981 (aged 29)
Fiona Dutriaux (FRA)	January 25, 1989 (aged 21)
Florence Girardet (FRA)	June 12, 1986 (aged 24)

Rider	Date of birth
Pascale Jeuland (FRA)	June 2, 1987 (aged 23)
Jenifer Letue (FRA)	June 2, 1990 (aged 20)
Emmanuelle Merlot (FRA)	January 10, 1986 (aged 24)
Edwige Pitel (FRA)	June 4, 1967 (aged 43)
Marion Rousse (FRA)	August 17, 1991 (aged 19)
Gabriela Slamova (CZE)	April 29, 1991 (aged 19)

== 2016 ==
Roster in 2016, ages as of 1 January 2016:

Rider	Date of birth
Aude Biannic (FRA)	March 27, 1991 (aged 24)
Charlotte Bravard (FRA)	January 12, 1992 (aged 23)
Coralie Demay (FRA)	October 10, 1992 (aged 23)
Annabelle Dreville (FRA)	March 4, 1995 (aged 20)
Eugénie Duval (FRA)	May 3, 1993 (aged 22)
Séverine Eraud (FRA)	February 24, 1995 (aged 20)

Rider	Date of birth
Roxane Fournier (FRA)	November 7, 1991 (aged 24)
Victorie Guilman (FRA)	March 25, 1996 (aged 19)
Pascale Jeuland-Tranchant (FRA)	June 2, 1987 (aged 28)
Greta Richioud (FRA)	October 11, 1996 (aged 19)
Amélie Rivat (FRA)	November 14, 1989 (aged 26)
Eri Yonamine (JPN)	April 25, 1991 (aged 24)

== 2021 ==
As of 31 May 2021

Roster in 2021, ages as of 1 January 2021:

Rider	Date of birth
Stine Borgli (NOR)	July 4, 1990 (aged 30)
Marta Cavalli (ITA)	March 18, 1998 (aged 22)
Brodie Chapman (AUS)	April 9, 1991 (aged 29)
Clara Copponi (FRA)	January 12, 1999 (aged 21)
Eugénie Duval (FRA)	May 3, 1993 (aged 27)
Emilia Fahlin (SWE)	October 24, 1988 (aged 32)

Rider	Date of birth
Maëlle Grossetête (FRA)	April 10, 1998 (aged 22)
Victorie Guilman (FRA)	March 25, 1996 (aged 24)
Marie Le Net (FRA)	January 25, 2000 (aged 20)
Évita Muzic (FRA)	May 26, 1999 (aged 21)
Cecilie Uttrup Ludwig (DNK)	August 23, 1995 (aged 25)
Jade Wiel (FRA)	April 2, 2000 (aged 20)

== 2022 ==
Roster in 2022, ages as of 1 January 2022:

Rider	Date of birth
Stine Borgli (NOR)	July 4, 1990 (aged 31)
Grace Brown (AUS)	July 7, 1992 (aged 28)
Marta Cavalli (ITA)	March 18, 1998 (aged 23)
Brodie Chapman (AUS)	April 9, 1991 (aged 30)
Clara Copponi (FRA)	January 12, 1999 (aged 22)
Eugénie Duval (FRA)	May 3, 1993 (aged 28)
Emilia Fahlin (SWE)	October 24, 1988 (aged 33)

Rider	Date of birth
Maëlle Grossetête (FRA)	April 10, 1998 (aged 23)
Vittoria Guazzini (ITA)	December 26, 2000 (aged 21)
Victorie Guilman (FRA)	March 25, 1996 (aged 25)
Marie Le Net (FRA)	January 25, 2000 (aged 21)
Évita Muzic (FRA)	May 26, 1999 (aged 22)
Cecilie Uttrup Ludwig (DNK)	August 23, 1995 (aged 26)
Jade Wiel (FRA)	April 2, 2000 (aged 21)
