= 2014 Tour de Bretagne Féminin =

Race details
- Dates: 16–20 July 2014
- Stages: Prologue + 4 stages
- Distance: 301 km (187 mi)
- Winning time: 9h 44' 19"

Results
Jersey awarded to the overall winner	Winner	Elisa Longo Borghini (ITA)	(Team Hitec Products)
	Second	Audrey Cordon (FRA)	(Team Hitec Products)
	Third	Doris Schweizer (SWI)	(Astana BePink)
Jersey awarded to the points classification winner	Points	Audrey Cordon (FRA)	(Team Hitec Products)
Jersey awarded to the mountains classification winner	Mountains	Elisa Longo Borghini (ITA)	(Team Hitec Products)
Jersey awarded to the young rider classification winner	Young rider	Lucie Pader (FRA)	(P-C.Futuroscope.86)
	Team	Poitou–Charentes.Futuroscope.86	

The 2014 Tour de Bretagne Féminin was the 9th edition of the Tour de Bretagne Féminin, a women's cycling stage race in France. It was rated by the UCI as a category 2.2 race and was held between 16 and 20 July 2014.

== Teams competing ==
=== UCI Women's Elite teams === Poitou–Charentes.Futuroscope.86 Lointek Bizkaia–Durango Top Girls Fassa Bortolo Astana BePink RusVelo Hitec Products	=== Non-UCI Elite teams === Matrix Fitness Vulpine Pearl Izumi Epic Cycles Scott Contessa Team NWVG Bike Air WV Breda Club Rus Lalbike By Wolf Cycling Racing Student	=== Regional & National teams === Switzerland Norway Bretagne Normandie Languedoc Roussillon Centre Poitou Charente

== Stages ==
=== Prologue ===
16 July 2014 – Plédran to Plédran, 2.3 km (1.4 mi)

Prologue Result & General classification

	Rider	Team	Time
1	Elisa Longo Borghini (ITA)	Hitec Products	3' 01"
2	Audrey Cordon (FRA)	Hitec Products	+ 2"
3	Oxana Kozonchuk (RUS)	RusVelo	+ 3"
4	Anouska Koster (NED)	Futurumshop.nl–Zannata	+ 3"
5	Jutta Stienen (SUI)	Switzerland (National team)	+ 5"
6	Aude Biannic (FRA)	Lointek	+ 5"
7	Sarah Storey (GBR)	Pearl Izumi	+ 5"
8	Evgenia Romanyuta (RUS)	Club Rus	+ 5"
9	Susanna Zorzi (ITA)	Astana BePink	+ 6"
10	Larissa Bruhwiler (SUI)	Switzerland (National team)	+ 6"

=== Stage 1 ===
17 July 2014 – St. Méen-le-Grand to St. Méen Le Grand, 90.7 km (56.4 mi)

Stage 1 result

	Rider	Team	Time
1	Doris Schweizer (SUI)	Astana BePink	3h 28' 16"
2	Audrey Cordon (FRA)	Hitec Products	+ 11"
3	Anouska Koster (NED)	Futurumshop.nl–Zannata	+ 11"
4	Oxana Kozonchuk (RUS)	RusVelo	+ 11"
5	Aude Biannic (FRA)	Lointek	+ 11"
6	Mirjam Gysling (SUI)	Switzerland (National team)	+ 11"
7	Roxane Fournier (FRA)	Poitou–Charentes.Futuroscope.86	+ 11"
8	Jessie Walker (GBR)	Matrix Racing Academy	+ 11"
9	Fiona Dutriaux (FRA)	Poitou–Charentes.Futuroscope.86	+ 11"
10	Mascha Pijnenborg (NED)	Futurumshop.nl–Zannata	+ 11"

General Classification after Stage 1

	Rider	Team	Time
1	Doris Schweizer (SUI)	Astana BePink	3h 31' 22"
2	Audrey Cordon (FRA)	Hitec Products	+ 11"
3	Anouska Koster (NED)	Futurumshop.nl–Zannata	+ 15"
4	Oxana Kozonchuk (RUS)	RusVelo	+ 21"
5	Susanna Zorzi (ITA)	Astana BePink	+ 23"
6	Aude Biannic (FRA)	Lointek	+ 23"
7	Belen Lopez (ESP)	Lointek	+ 24"
8	Pascale Jeuland (FRA)	Poitou–Charentes.Futuroscope.86	+ 24"
9	Elisa Longo Borghini (ITA)	Hitec Products	+ 24"
10	Eugénie Duval (FRA)	Normandie	+ 26"

=== Stage 2 ===
18 July 2014, – Radenac to Radenac (individual time trial), 11.2 km (7.0 mi)

Stage 2 result

	Rider	Team	Time
1	Sarah Storey (GBR)	Pearl Izumi	15' 21"
2	Aude Biannic (FRA)	Lointek	+ 5"
3	Audrey Cordon (FRA)	Hitec Products	+ 6"
4	Silvia Valsecchi (ITA)	Astana BePink	+ 10"
5	Elisa Longo Borghini (ITA)	Hitec Products	+ 10"
6	Mélodie Lesueur (FRA)	Lointek	+ 22"
7	Evgenia Romanyuta (RUS)	Club Rus	+ 24"
8	Nicole Hanselmann (SUI)	Bigla Cycling Team	+ 24"
9	Doris Schweizer (SUI)	Astana BePink	+ 31"
10	Coralie Demay (FRA)	Bretagne	+ 36"

General Classification after Stage 2

	Rider	Team	Time
1	Audrey Cordon (FRA)	Hitec Products	3h 47' 00"
2	Aude Biannic (FRA)	Lointek	+ 11"
3	Sarah Storey (GBR)	Pearl Izumi	+ 12"
4	Doris Schweizer (SUI)	Astana BePink	+ 14"
5	Elisa Longo Borghini (ITA)	Hitec Products	+ 17"
6	Silvia Valsecchi (ITA)	Astana BePink	+ 23"
7	Mélodie Lesueur (FRA)	Lointek	+ 36"
8	Nicole Hanselmann (SUI)	Bigla Cycling Team	+ 38"
9	Anouska Koster (NED)	Futurumshop.nl–Zannata	+ 38"
10	Susanna Zorzi (ITA)	Astana BePink	+ 45"

=== Stage 3 ===
19 July 2014 – Guingamp to Yffiniac, 94.1 km (58.5 mi)

Stage 3 result

	Rider	Team	Time
1	Elisa Longo Borghini (ITA)	Hitec Products	3h 23' 06"
2	Audrey Cordon (FRA)	Hitec Products	+ 27"
3	Vita Heine (LAT)	Norway (National team)	+ 55"
4	Aude Biannic (FRA)	Lointek	+ 55"
5	Charlotte Bravard (FRA)	Poitou–Charentes.Futuroscope.86	+ 55"
6	Doris Schweizer (SUI)	Astana BePink	+ 55"
7	Lucie Pader (FRA)	Poitou–Charentes.Futuroscope.86	+ 55"
8	Mélodie Lesueur (FRA)	Lointek	+ 2' 41"
9	Marion Sicot (FRA)	Centre	+ 2' 41"
10	Fiona Dutriaux (FRA)	Poitou–Charentes.Futuroscope.86	+ 2' 59"

General Classification after Stage 3

	Rider	Team	Time
1	Elisa Longo Borghini (ITA)	Hitec Products	7h 10' 13"
2	Audrey Cordon (FRA)	Hitec Products	+ 14"
3	Aude Biannic (FRA)	Lointek	+ 59"
4	Doris Schweizer (SUI)	Astana BePink	+ 1' 02"
5	Lucie Pader (FRA)	Poitou–Charentes.Futuroscope.86	+ 1' 47"
6	Vita Heine (LAT)	Norway (National team)	+ 1' 50"
7	Charlotte Bravard (FRA)	Poitou–Charentes.Futuroscope.86	+ 1' 51"
8	Sarah Storey (GBR)	Pearl Izumi	+ 3' 04"
9	Mélodie Lesueur (FRA)	Futurumshop.nl–Zannata	+ 3' 10"
10	Silvia Vlasecchi (ITA)	Astana BePink	+ 3' 15"

=== Stage 4 ===
20 July 2014 – Lampaul-Ploudalmézeau to Landivisiau, 102.7 km (63.8 mi)

Stage 4 result

	Rider	Team	Time
1	Audrey Cordon (FRA)	Hitec Products	2h 34' 10"
2	Jutta Stienen (SUI)	Switzerland (National team)	+ 1"
3	Elisa Longo Borghini (ITA)	Hitec Products	+ 1"
4	Soraya Paladin (ITA)	Top Girls Fassa Bortolo	+ 1"
5	Susanna Zorzi (ITA)	Astana BePink	+ 1"
6	Doris Schweizer (SUI)	Astana BePink	+ 10""
7	Nicole Hanselmann (SUI)	Bigla Cycling Team	+ 28"
8	Sara Olsson (SWE)	Team Hitec Products	+ 28"
9	Pascale Jeuland (FRA)	Poitou–Charentes.Futuroscope.86	+ 41"
10	Aude Biannic (FRA)	Lointek	+ 1' 04"

Final General Classification

	Rider	Team	Time
1	Elisa Longo Borghini (ITA)	Hitec Products	9h 44' 19"
2	Audrey Cordon (FRA)	Hitec Products	+ 8"
3	Doris Schweizer (SUI)	Astana BePink	+ 1' 14"
4	Aude Biannic (FRA)	Lointek	+ 2' 07"
5	Lucie Pader (FRA)	Poitou–Charentes.Futuroscope.86	+ 3' 15"
6	Vita Heine (LAT)	Norway (National team)	+ 3' 18"
7	Charlotte Bravard (FRA)	Poitou–Charentes.Futuroscope.86	+ 3' 19"
8	Susanna Zorzi (ITA)	Astana BePink	+ 3' 41"
9	Jutta Stienen (SUI)	Switzerland (National team)	+ 3' 48"
10	Nicole Hanselmann (SUI)	Bigla Cycling Team	+ 3' 56"

== Classification leadership ==
Stage	Winner	General classification	Young rider classification	Mountains classification	Points classification	Teams classification
P	Elisa Longo Borghini	Elisa Longo Borghini	Elisa Longo Borghini	No data given	No data given	No data given
1	Doris Schweizer	Doris Schweizer	Anouska Koster	No data given	No data given	No data given
2	Sarah Storey	Audrey Cordon	Anouska Koster	No data given	No data given	No data given
3	Elisa Longo Borghini	Elisa Longo Borghini	Lucie Pader	Elisa Longo Borghini	No data given	Poitou–Charentes.Futuroscope.86
4	Audrey Cordon	Elisa Longo Borghini	Lucie Pader	Elisa Longo Borghini	Audrey Cordon	Poitou–Charentes.Futuroscope.86
Final		Elisa Longo Borghini	Lucie Pader	Elisa Longo Borghini	Audrey Cordon	Poitou–Charentes.Futuroscope.86

== See also ==
- 2014 in women's road cycling
