= 2026 Women's Tour Down Under =

2026 UCI Women's World Tour, race 1 of 26
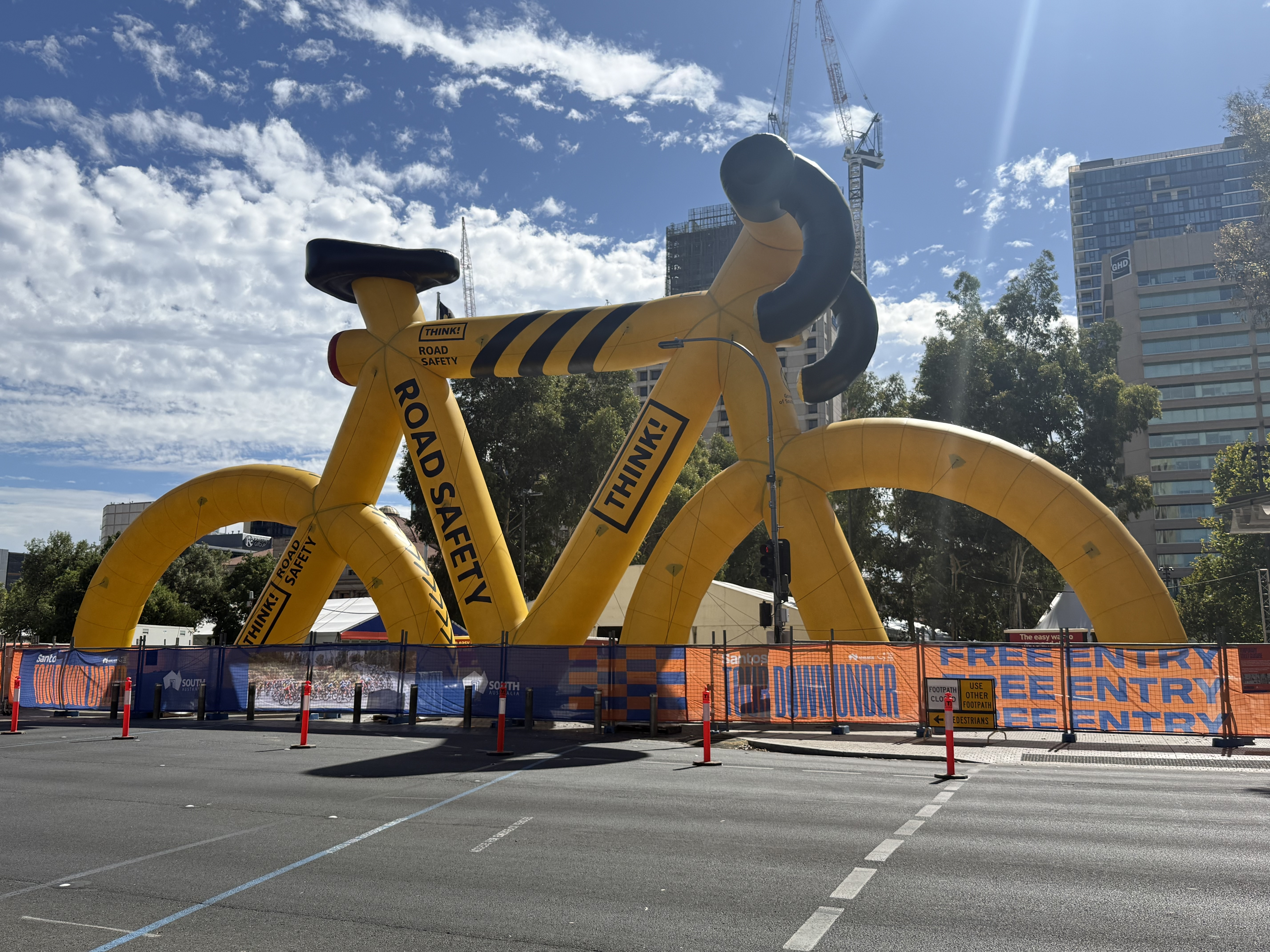
- Tour Village in Victoria Square, Adelaide, featuring a giant yellow inflatable bike

Race details
- Dates: 17–19 January 2026
- Stages: 3
- Distance: 394.6 km (245.2 mi)
- Winning time: 10h 27' 36"

Results
Jersey awarded to the overall winner	Winner	Noemi Rüegg (SUI)	(EF Education–Oatly)
	Second	Mavi Garcia (ESP)	(UAE Team ADQ)
	Third	Paula Blasi (ESP)	(UAE Team ADQ)
Jersey awarded to the mountains classification winner	Mountains	Paula Blasi (ESP)	(UAE Team ADQ)
Jersey awarded to the young rider classification winner	Young rider	Justyna Czapla (GER)	(Canyon//SRAM Zondacrypto)
Jersey awarded to the sprints classification winner	Sprints	Ally Wollaston (NZL)	(FDJ United–Suez)
	Team	UAE Team ADQ	

The 2026 Women's Tour Down Under (officially Santos Women's Tour Down Under 2026 for sponsorship reasons) was the 9th edition of the Women's Tour Down Under, and the first event of the 2026 UCI Women's World Tour. It began on 17 January in Willunga and finished on 19 January in Campbelltown.

The race was won by Swiss rider Noemi Rüegg of EF Education–Oatly for the second year in a row.

== Teams ==
Fourteen UCI Women's WorldTeams and the Australian national team made up the fifteen teams that took part in the race.

UCI Women's WorldTeams

- AG Insurance–Soudal
- Canyon//SRAM Zondacrypto
- EF Education–Oatly
- FDJ United–Suez
- Fenix–Premier Tech
- Human Powered Health
- Lidl–Trek
- Liv AlUla Jayco
- Movistar Team
- Team Picnic–PostNL
- Team SD Worx–Protime
- Visma–Lease a Bike
- UAE Team ADQ
- Uno-X Mobility

National teams

- Australia

== Route ==
Stage characteristics and winners
Stage	Date	Course	Distance	Type	Stage winner
1	17 January	Willunga to Willunga	137.4 km (85.4 mi)	Hilly stage	Ally Wollaston (NZL)
2	18 January	Magill to Paracombe	130.7 km (81.2 mi)	Hilly stage	Ally Wollaston (NZL)
3	19 January	Norwood to Campbelltown	126.5 km (78.6 mi)	Hilly stage	Noemi Rüegg (SUI)
Total			394.6 km (245.2 mi)		

== Stages ==
=== Stage 1 ===
17 January 2026 — Willunga to Willunga, 137.4 km (85.4 mi)

Stage 1 Result
Rank	Rider	Team	Time
1	Ally Wollaston (NZL)	FDJ United–Suez	3h 28' 31"
2	Josie Nelson (GBR)	Team Picnic–PostNL	+ 0"
3	Femke Gerritse (NED)	Team SD Worx–Protime	+ 0"
4	Noemi Rüegg (SUI)	EF Education–Oatly	+ 0"
5	Sarah Van Dam (CAN)	Visma–Lease a Bike	+ 0"
6	Marta Lach (POL)	Team SD Worx–Protime	+ 0"
7	Fien Van Eynde (BEL)	Fenix–Premier Tech	+ 0"
8	Sophie Edwards (AUS)	Australia	+ 0"
9	Mavi García (ESP)	UAE Team ADQ	+ 0"
10	Dominika Włodarczyk (POL)	UAE Team ADQ	+ 0"

General classification after Stage 1
Rank	Rider	Team	Time
1	Ally Wollaston (NZL)	FDJ United–Suez	3h 28' 21"
2	Josie Nelson (GBR)	Team Picnic–PostNL	+ 4"
3	Olivia Baril (CAN)	Movistar Team	+ 5"
4	Femke Gerritse (NED)	Team SD Worx–Protime	+ 6"
5	Marta Lach (POL)	Team SD Worx–Protime	+ 8"
6	Margaux Vigié (FRA)	Visma–Lease a Bike	+ 9"
7	Loes Adegeest (NED)	Lidl–Trek	+ 9"
8	Noemi Rüegg (SUI)	EF Education–Oatly	+ 10"
9	Sarah Van Dam (CAN)	Visma–Lease a Bike	+ 10"
10	Fien Van Eynde (BEL)	Fenix–Premier Tech	+ 10"

=== Stage 2 ===
18 January 2026 — Magill to Paracombe, 130.7 km (81.2 mi)

Stage 2 Result
Rank	Rider	Team	Time
1	Ally Wollaston (NZL)	FDJ United–Suez	3h 35' 20"
2	Noemi Rüegg (SUI)	EF Education–Oatly	+ 0"
3	Josie Nelson (GBR)	Team Picnic–PostNL	+ 0"
4	Paula Blasi (ESP)	UAE Team ADQ	+ 0"
5	Dominika Włodarczyk (POL)	UAE Team ADQ	+ 0"
6	Ruby Roseman-Gannon (AUS)	Liv AlUla Jayco	+ 0"
7	Alexandra Manly (AUS)	AG Insurance–Soudal	+ 0"
8	Nina Buijsman (NED)	Human Powered Health	+ 0"
9	Fien Van Eynde (BEL)	Fenix–Premier Tech	+ 0"
10	Mavi García (ESP)	UAE Team ADQ	+ 0"

General classification after Stage 2
Rank	Rider	Team	Time
1	Ally Wollaston (NZL)	FDJ United–Suez	7h 03' 27"
2	Josie Nelson (GBR)	Team Picnic–PostNL	+ 14"
3	Noemi Rüegg (SUI)	EF Education–Oatly	+ 17"
4	Olivia Baril (CAN)	Movistar Team	+ 19"
5	Marta Lach (POL)	Team SD Worx–Protime	+ 22"
6	Sarah Van Dam (CAN)	Visma–Lease a Bike	+ 23"
7	Dominika Włodarczyk (POL)	UAE Team ADQ	+ 24"
8	Fien Van Eynde (BEL)	Fenix–Premier Tech	+ 24"
9	Mavi García (ESP)	UAE Team ADQ	+ 24"
10	Nina Buijsman (NED)	Human Powered Health	+ 24"

=== Stage 3 ===
19 January 2026 — Norwood to Campbelltown, 126.5 km (78.6 mi)

Stage 3 Result
Rank	Rider	Team	Time
1	Noemi Rüegg (SUI)	EF Education–Oatly	3h 24' 02"
2	Mavi García (ESP)	UAE Team ADQ	+ 1"
3	Paula Blasi (ESP)	UAE Team ADQ	+ 1"
4	Dominika Włodarczyk (POL)	UAE Team ADQ	+ 2"
5	Sarah Van Dam (CAN)	Visma–Lease a Bike	+ 12"
6	Nina Buijsman (NED)	Human Powered Health	+ 12"
7	Ella Wyllie (NZL)	Liv AlUla Jayco	+ 12"
8	Mireia Benito (ESP)	AG Insurance–Soudal	+ 12"
9	Amanda Spratt (AUS)	Lidl–Trek	+ 12"
10	Lotte Claes (BEL)	Fenix–Premier Tech	+ 12"

General classification after Stage 3
Rank	Rider	Team	Time
1	Noemi Rüegg (SUI)	EF Education–Oatly	10h 27' 36"
2	Mavi García (ESP)	UAE Team ADQ	+ 11"
3	Paula Blasi (ESP)	UAE Team ADQ	+ 14"
4	Dominika Włodarczyk (POL)	UAE Team ADQ	+ 17"
5	Sarah Van Dam (CAN)	Visma–Lease a Bike	+ 25"
6	Nina Buijsman (NED)	Human Powered Health	+ 29"
7	Amanda Spratt (AUS)	Lidl–Trek	+ 29"
8	Ella Wyllie (NZL)	Liv AlUla Jayco	+ 29"
9	Mireia Benito (ESP)	AG Insurance–Soudal	+ 29"
10	Lotte Claes (BEL)	Fenix–Premier Tech	+ 29"

== Classification leadership table ==
Classification leadership by stage
Stage	Winner	General classification	Sprints classification	Mountains classification	Young rider classification	Most competitive rider	Team classification
1	Ally Wollaston	Ally Wollaston	Ally Wollaston	Alessia Vigilia	Justyna Czapla	Alessia Vigilia	Visma–Lease a Bike
2	Ally Wollaston	Ally Wollaston	Ally Wollaston	Paula Blasi	Justyna Czapla	Wilma Aintila	UAE Team ADQ
3	Noemi Rüegg	Noemi Rüegg	Ally Wollaston	Paula Blasi	Justyna Czapla	Carina Schrempf	UAE Team ADQ
Final		Noemi Rüegg	Ally Wollaston	Paula Blasi	Justyna Czapla	Not awarded	UAE Team ADQ

== Classification standings ==
Legend
Denotes the winner of the general classification	Denotes the winner of the sprints classification
Denotes the winner of the mountains classification	Denotes the winner of the young rider classification
Denotes the winner of the combativity award	

=== General classification ===
Final general classification (1–10)
Rank	Rider	Team	Time
1	Noemi Rüegg (SUI)	EF Education–Oatly	10h 27' 36"
2	Mavi García (ESP)	UAE Team ADQ	+ 11"
3	Paula Blasi (ESP)	UAE Team ADQ	+ 14"
4	Dominika Włodarczyk (POL)	UAE Team ADQ	+ 17"
5	Sarah Van Dam (CAN)	Visma–Lease a Bike	+ 25"
6	Nina Buijsman (NED)	Human Powered Health	+ 29"
7	Amanda Spratt (AUS)	Lidl–Trek	+ 29"
8	Ella Wyllie (NZL)	Liv AlUla Jayco	+ 29"
9	Mireia Benito (ESP)	AG Insurance–Soudal	+ 29"
10	Lotte Claes (BEL)	Fenix–Premier Tech	+ 29"

=== Sprints classification ===
Final sprints classification (1–10)
Rank	Rider	Team	Points
1	Ally Wollaston (NZL)	FDJ United–Suez	65
2	Noemi Rüegg (SUI)	EF Education–Oatly	65
3	Josie Nelson (GBR)	Team Picnic–PostNL	49
4	Dominika Włodarczyk (POL)	UAE Team ADQ	39
5	Mavi García (ESP)	UAE Team ADQ	34
6	Paula Blasi (ESP)	UAE Team ADQ	34
7	Sarah Van Dam (CAN)	Visma–Lease a Bike	32
8	Nina Buijsman (NED)	Human Powered Health	24
9	Femke Gerritse (NED)	Team SD Worx–Protime	22
10	Fien Van Eynde (BEL)	Fenix–Premier Tech	22

=== Mountains classification ===
Final mountains classification (1–10)
Rank	Rider	Team	Points
1	Paula Blasi (ESP)	UAE Team ADQ	38
2	Alessia Vigilia (ITA)	Uno-X Mobility	17
3	Mavi García (ESP)	UAE Team ADQ	16
4	Dominika Włodarczyk (POL)	UAE Team ADQ	12
5	Noemi Rüegg (SUI)	EF Education–Oatly	11
6	Gaia Realini (ITA)	Lidl–Trek	11
7	Wilma Aintila (FIN)	Canyon//SRAM Zondacrypto	7
8	Lauren Dickson (GBR)	FDJ United–Suez	5
9	Ally Wollaston (NZL)	FDJ United–Suez	5
10	Sarah Van Dam (CAN)	Visma–Lease a Bike	4

=== Young rider classification ===
Final young rider classification (1–10)
Rank	Rider	Team	Time
1	Justyna Czapla (GER)	Canyon//SRAM Zondacrypto	10h 28' 20"
2	Rosita Reijnhout (NED)	Visma–Lease a Bike	+ 0"
3	Paula Ositz (ESP)	Movistar Team	+ 3' 09"
4	Mackenzie Coupland (AUS)	Liv AlUla Jayco	+ 3' 58"
5	Lucía Ruiz Pérez (ESP)	Movistar Team	+ 5' 11"
6	Marion Bunel (FRA)	Visma–Lease a Bike	+ 5' 48"
7	Tully Schweitzer (AUS)	Australia	+ 6' 55"
8	Julia Kopecký (CZE)	Team SD Worx–Protime	+ 9' 25"
9	Juliana Londoño (COL)	Team Picnic–PostNL	+ 11' 05"
10	Stina Kagevi (SWE)	EF Education–Oatly	+ 11' 07"

=== Team classification ===
Final team classification (1–10)
Rank	Team	Time
1	(United Arab Emirates) UAE Team ADQ	31h 23' 43"
2	(Netherlands) Visma–Lease a Bike	+ 49"
3	(Spain) Movistar Team	+ 5' 17"
4	(France) FDJ United–Suez	+ 5' 20"
5	(Australia) Liv AlUla Jayco	+ 5' 22"
6	(United States) EF Education–Oatly	+ 7' 35"
7	(Belgium) AG Insurance–Soudal	+ 7' 38"
8	(Germany) Lidl–Trek	+ 7' 53"
9	(Norway) Uno-X Mobility	+ 10' 01"
10	(Germany) Canyon//SRAM Zondacrypto	+ 10' 13"
