= Nina Buijsman =

Dutch cyclist (born 1997)

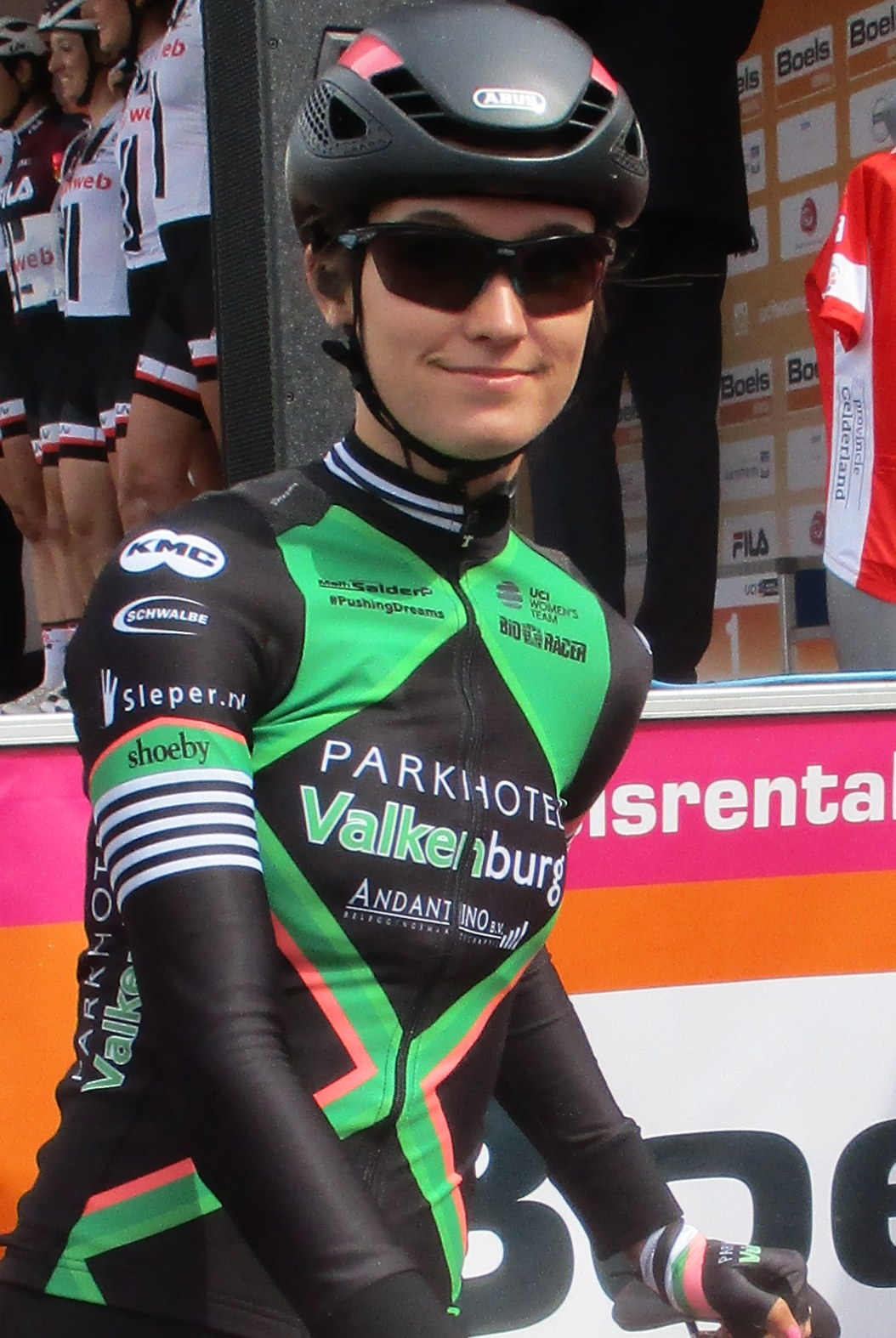
- Buysman at the 2018 Holland Ladies Tour

Personal information
- Full name: Nina Buijsman
- Born: 16 November 1997 (age 28) Bovenkarspel, Netherlands

Cycling career
- Sport: Cycling
- Current team: Human Powered Health
- Discipline: Road
- Role: Rider
- Rider type: Climber

Professional teams
- 2017–2026: Parkhotel Valkenburg–Destil
- 2022–2023: Human Powered Health
- 2024–2025: FDJ–Suez
- 2026-: Human Powered Health

Nina Buijsman (born 16 November 1997) is a Dutch racing cyclist, who currently rides for UCI Women's WorldTeam FDJ United–Suez. She rode for Parkhotel Valkenburg in the women's team time trial event at the 2018 UCI Road World Championships.

== Major results ==
2016
4th Overall Rás na mBan

1st Young Rider classification

2017
1st Omloop van de IJsseldelta
2021
1st Stage 2 Tour de Feminin
1st Mountains classification, Ladies Tour of Norway
5th La Classique Morbihan
6th Tre Valli Varesine
7th La Choralis Fourmies Féminine
8th Grand Prix du Morbihan Féminin
2022
7th Overall Tour Féminin International des Pyrénées
9th Overall Belgium Tour
10th Kreiz Breizh Elites Féminin
2023
3rd Cadel Evans Great Ocean Road Race
3rd Schwalbe Classic
4th La Périgord Ladies
6th Overall Tour Cycliste Féminin International de l'Ardèche
7th Leiedal Koerse
2024
1st Stage 3 Tour Cycliste Féminin International de l'Ardèche
3rd La Périgord Ladies
2026
6th Tour Down Under
