= Victorie Guilman =

French cyclist (born 1966)

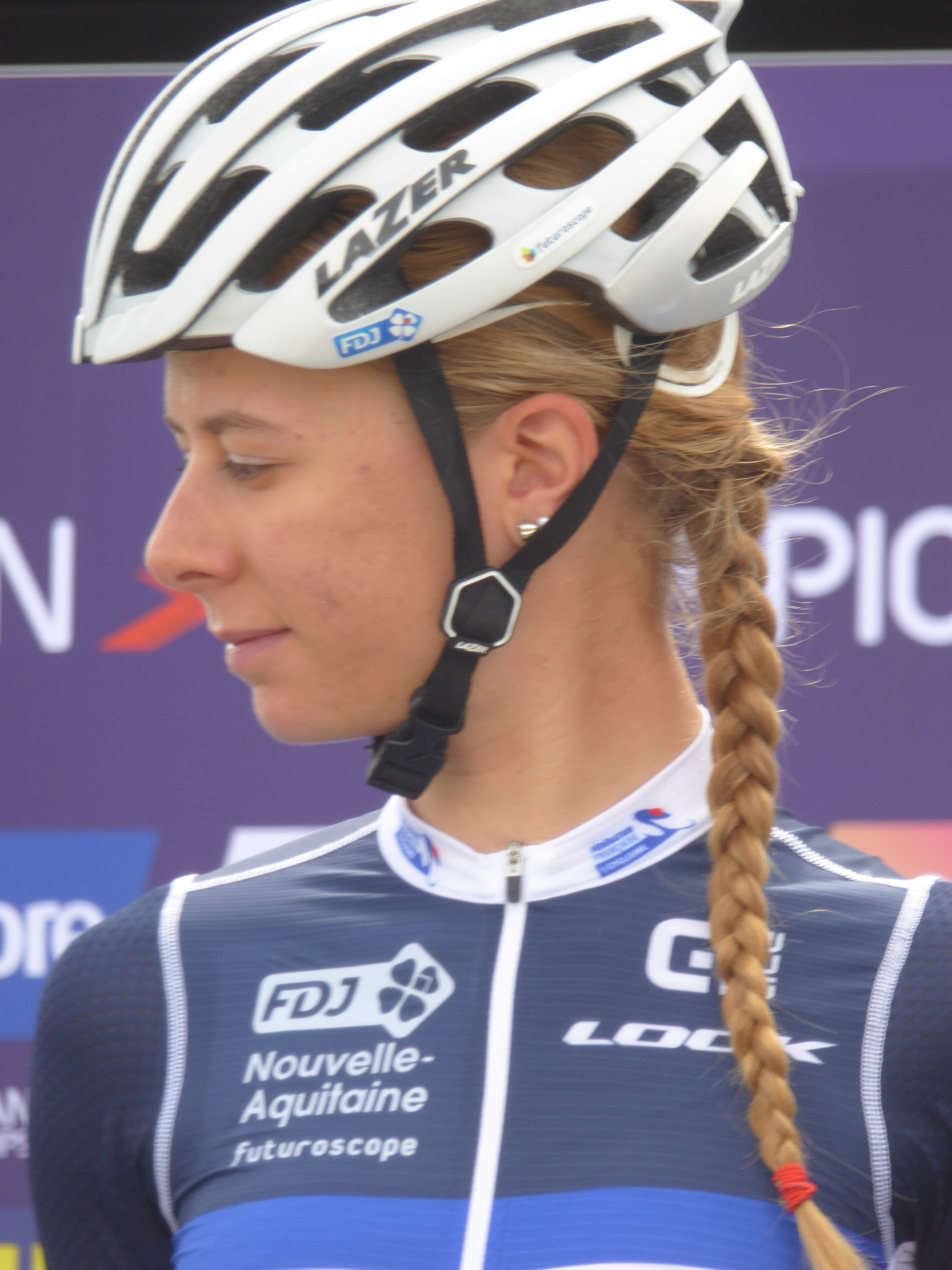
- Guilman at the 2018 European Road Cycling Championships.

Personal information
- Full name: Victorie Guilman
- Born: 25 March 1996 (age 30) Angoulême, France

Cycling career
- Sport: Cycling
- Current team: St. Michel–Preference Home–Auber93
- Discipline: Road
- Role: Rider

Amateur team
- 2015: Poitou-Charentes.Futuroscope.86 (stagiaire)

Professional teams
- 2016–2023: Poitou-Charentes.Futuroscope.86
- 2024: St. Michel–Mavic–Auber93
- 2025–: Cofidis

Victorie Guilman (born 25 March 1996) is a French professional racing cyclist, who currently rides for UCI Women's Continental Team St. Michel–Preference Home–Auber93. In 2025, she will join Cofidis on a two year contract.

== Major results ==
2015
10th Grand Prix de Plumelec-Morbihan Dames
2017
5th Road race, National Road Championships
2018
9th Kreiz Breizh Elites Dames
2019
2nd Road race, National Road Championships
4th La Picto–Charentaise
2020
4th Road race, National Road Championships
6th Overall Tour Cycliste Féminin International de l'Ardèche
2021
5th Road race, National Road Championships
6th Grand Prix Féminin de Chambéry
7th La Périgord Ladies
2022
1st Mountains classification, Bretagne Ladies Tour
2nd Grand Prix Féminin de Chambéry
2023
1st Grand Prix Féminin de Chambéry
5th Alpes Grésivaudan Classic
5th La Périgord Ladies
6th Grand Prix du Morbihan Féminin
2024
2nd Région Pays de la Loire Tour
6th La Classique Morbihan
8th Overall Tour of Britain
