= Alessia Vigilia =

Italian cyclist

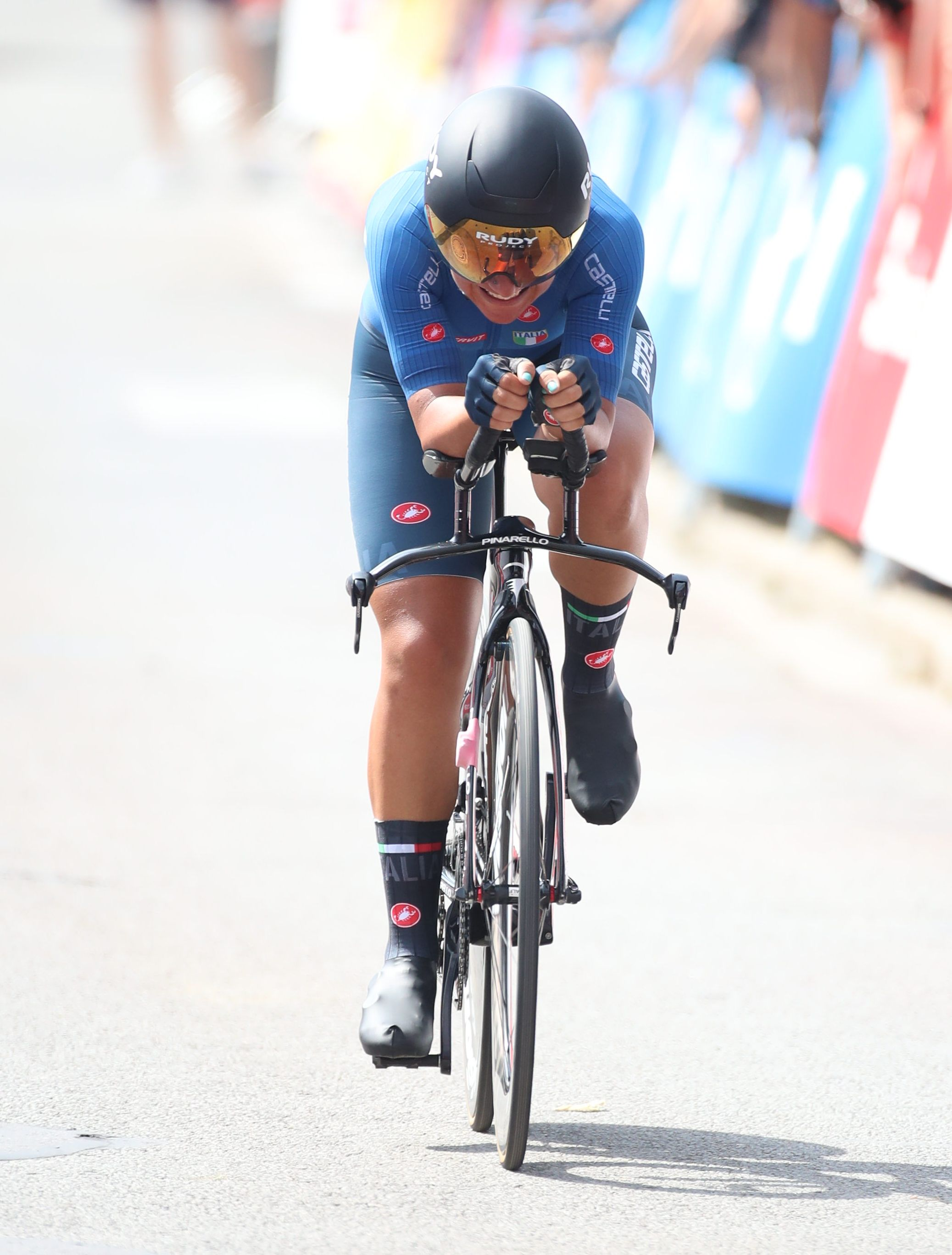
- Vigilia at the 2022 European Championships Road Cycling Women's Time Trial

Personal information
- Full name: Alessia Vigilia
- Born: 1 September 1999 (age 27) Bolzano, Italy

Cycling career
- Sport: Cycling
- Current team: FDJ United–Suez
- Discipline: Road
- Role: Rider

Amateur team
- 2020: Casa Dorada Women Cycling

Professional teams
- 2018–2019: Valcar–PBM
- 2020–2021: Cronos–Casa Dorada
- 2022–2023: Top Girls Fassa Bortolo
- 2024–2025: FDJ–Suez
- 2026–: Uno-X Mobility

Alessia Vigilia (born 1 September 1999) is an Italian racing cyclist, who currently rides for UCI Women's WorldTeam Uno-X Mobility. She rode for Valcar–PBM in the women's team time trial event at the 2018 UCI Road World Championships.

== Major results ==
2016
1st Time trial, National Junior Road Championships
2nd Time trial, UEC European Junior Road Championships
8th Time trial, UCI Junior Road World Championships
2017
2nd Time trial, UCI Junior Road World Championships
2nd Time trial, National Junior Road Championships
2018
8th Time trial, UCI Junior Road World Championships
2019
7th Postnord Vårgårda WestSweden TTT
10th Donostia San Sebastian Klasikoa Women
2022
7th À travers les Hauts-de-France
9th Overall Giro della Toscana Int. Femminile – Memorial Michela Fanini
2023
1st Overall Giro della Toscana Int. Femminile – Memorial Michela Fanini

1st Mountains classification
1st Points classification

1st Umag Trophy
National Road Championships

1st Team time trial
3rd Time trial

2nd La Classique Morbihan
3rd Overall Bretagne Ladies Tour

1st Young rider classification

4th Durango-Durango Emakumeen Saria
7th Gran Premio della Liberazione
8th À travers les Hauts-de-France
10th Grand Prix du Morbihan Féminin
10th Overall Trofeo Ponente in Rosa
2024
2nd Overall Bretagne Ladies Tour

1st Young rider classification

5th Time trial, National Road Championships
2026
1st Giro dell'Emilia Internazionale Donne Elite
