= Eugénie Duval =

French cyclist (born 1993)

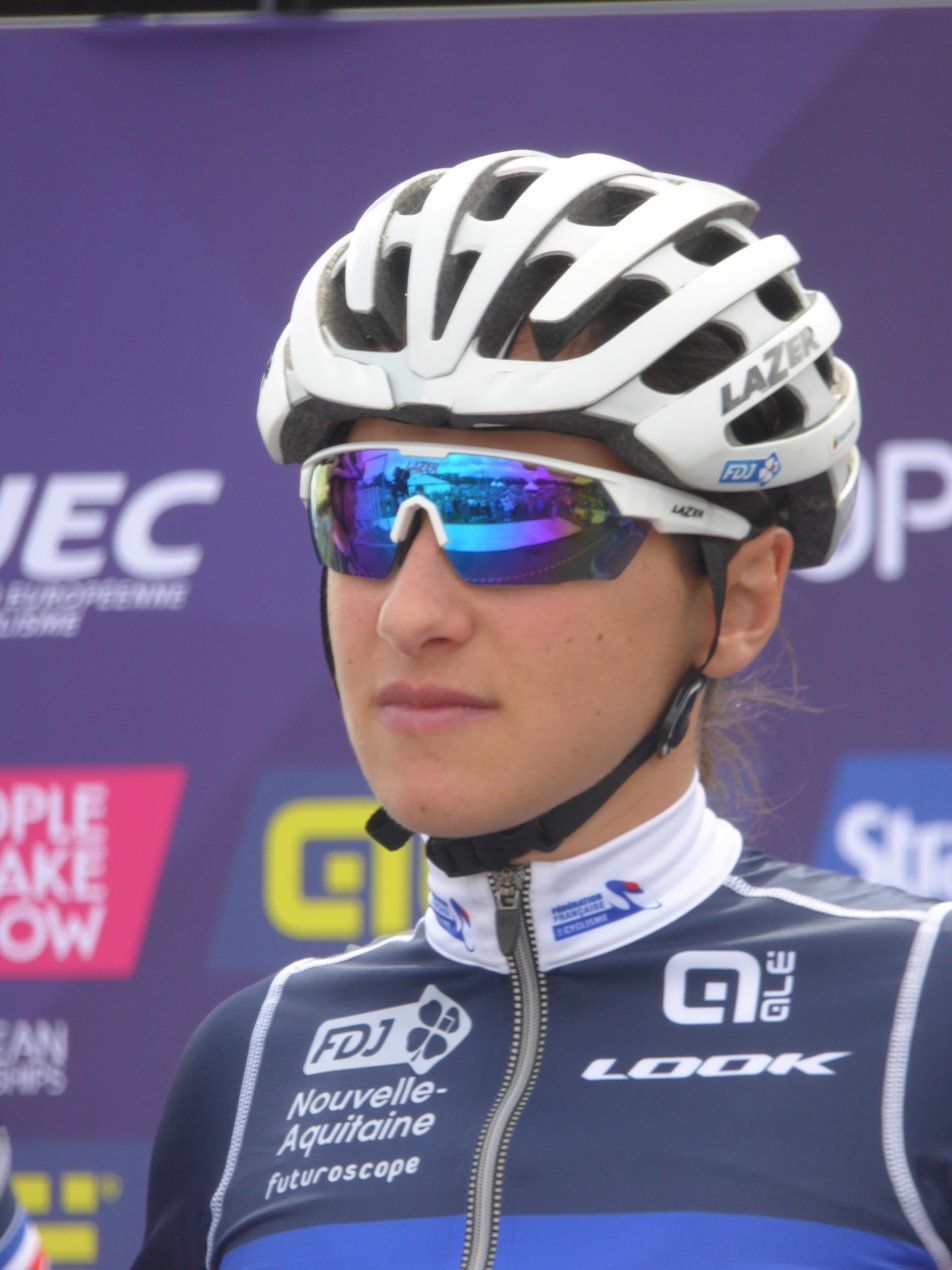
- Duval at the 2018 European Road Cycling Championships.

Personal information
- Full name: Eugénie Duval
- Born: 3 May 1993 (age 33) Évreux, France
- Height: 1.62 m (5 ft 4 in)
- Weight: 53 kg (117 lb; 8 st 5 lb)

Cycling career
- Sport: Cycling
- Current team: FDJ United–Suez
- Disciplines: Road; Track
- Role: Rider

Professional team
- 2015–: Poitou-Charentes.Futuroscope.86

Eugénie Duval (born 3 May 1993) is a French racing cyclist, who currently rides for UCI Women's WorldTeam FDJ United–Suez. She rode at the 2014 UCI Road World Championships.

== Major results ==
2014
10th Cholet Pays de Loire Dames
2nd Scratch, Open des Nations sur Piste de Roubaix (Under-23)
2016
2nd Points race, Fenioux France Trophy
4th Overall Trophée d'Or Féminin
5th Overall Tour de Bretagne Féminin
9th Overall Tour of Zhoushan Island
10th SwissEver GP Cham - Hagendorn
2017
6th Team time trial, UCI Road World Championships
6th Time trial, National Road Championships
6th Chrono des Nations
8th Crescent Vårgårda UCI Women's WorldTour TTT
2018
1st Mountains classification Boels Ladies Tour
4th Tour de Belle Isle en Terre-Kreiz Breizh Elites Dames
5th Overall Setmana Ciclista Valenciana
5th La Classique Morbihan
6th Grand Prix de Plumelec-Morbihan Dames
8th Grand Prix de Dottignies
8th Time trial, National Road Championships
2019
5th Mixed team relay, UEC European Road Championships
5th La Périgord Ladies
6th Grand Prix International d'Isbergues
6th Road race, National Road Championships
6th Omloop van het Hageland
9th Overall Tour de Belle Isle en Terre-Kreiz Breizh Elites Dames
10th La Classique Morbihan
10th Prudential RideLondon Classique
10th Le Samyn des Dames
2020
4th Mixed team relay, UEC European Road Championships
5th La Périgord Ladies
6th Road race, National Road Championships
10th Three Days of Bruges–De Panne
10th Clasica Femenina Navarra
2021
4th Mixed team relay, UEC European Road Championships
9th Ronde de Mouscron
2022
5th Road race, National Road Championships
5th Postnord Vårgårda UCI Women's WorldTour TTT
8th Nokere Koerse voor Dames
8th A Travers les Hauts de France
2023
4th Paris–Roubaix
10th Dwars door het Hageland
