= 2014 Grand Prix de Plumelec-Morbihan Dames =

Race details
- Dates: 30 May 2014
- Stages: 1

The 2014 Grand Prix de Plumelec-Morbihan Dames is a one-day women's cycle race held in France on 30 May 2014. The race had a UCI rating of 1.2.

== Results ==
	Rider	Team	Time
1	Audrey Cordon (FRA)	Hitec Products	3h 06' 30"
2	Elisa Longo Borghini (ITA)	Hitec Products	s.t.
3	Charlotte Bravard (FRA)	Poitou–Charentes.Futuroscope.86	+ 2' 14"
4	Aude Biannic (FRA)	Lointek	+ 3' 56"
5	Manon Souyris (FRA)	Poitou–Charentes.Futuroscope.86	+ 3' 57"
6	Edwige Pitel (FRA)	S.C. Michela Fanini Rox	+ 4' 00"
7	Sheyla Gutiérrez (ESP)	Lointek	+ 4' 08"
8	Amelie Rivat (FRA)	Poitou–Charentes.Futuroscope.86	+ 4' 42"
9	Marion Sicot (FRA)		+ 4' 42"
10	Melanie Bravard (FRA)	Lointek	+ 4' 42"

== See also ==
- 2014 in women's road cycling
