= 2018 Setmana Ciclista Valenciana =

2018 Semana Ciclista Valenciana
Race details
- Dates: 22–25 February 2018
- Stages: 4
- Distance: 488 km (303.2 mi)
- Winning time: 12h 47' 11"

Results
Jersey awarded to the overall winner	Winner	Hannah Barnes (GBR)	(Canyon–SRAM)
	Second	Ashleigh Moolman (RSA)	(Cervélo–Bigla Pro Cycling)
	Third	Alicia González Blanco (ESP)	(Movistar Team)
Jersey awarded to the mountains classification winner	Mountains	Ashleigh Moolman (RSA)	(Cervélo–Bigla Pro Cycling)
Jersey awarded to the youth classification winner	Youth	Abby-Mae Parkinson (GBR)	(Trek–Drops)
Jersey awarded to the sprints classification winner	Sprints	Belle De Gast (NED)	(Parkhotel Valkenburg)
	Team	Canyon–SRAM	

The 2018 Setmana Ciclista Valenciana was a women's cycle stage race that was held in Spain from 22 to 25 February, 2018. The 2018 edition of the race was the second edition of the Setmana Ciclista Valenciana.

The race was won by British rider Hannah Barnes, riding for the Canyon–SRAM team, taking two stage victories during the event. Barnes finished 17 seconds clear of her closest competitor, South Africa's Ashleigh Moolman (Cervélo–Bigla Pro Cycling), while the podium was completed by the highest-placed home rider, Alicia González Blanco of the Movistar Team, a further eight seconds in arrears.

In the other classifications, Moolman won the polka-dot jersey for winning the mountains classification, while Cristina Martínez (Bizkaia Durango–Euskadi Murias) won the yellow jersey for top rider from the Valencian Community. Other jerseys were won by Belle De Gast (mountains for Parkhotel Valkenburg) and Abby-Mae Parkinson (young rider for Trek–Drops), while Canyon–SRAM won the teams classification, placing Barnes, Pauline Ferrand-Prévot and Katarzyna Niewiadoma in the top-ten overall.

== Teams ==
29 teams participated in the 2018 Setmana Ciclista Valenciana.

UCI Women's Teams

- Alé–Cipollini
- Astana
- Bepink
- Bizkaia Durango–Euskadi Murias
- Canyon–SRAM
- Cervélo–Bigla Pro Cycling
- Doltcini–Van Eyck Sport
- FDJ Nouvelle-Aquitaine Futuroscope
- Health Mate–Cyclelive Team
- Minsk Cycling Club
- Movistar Team
- Parkhotel Valkenburg
- S.C. Michela Fanini Rox
- Servetto–Stradalli Cycle–Alurecycling
- Sopela Women's Team
- Top Girls Fassa Bortolo
- Trek–Drops
- Valcar–PBM
- WNT–Rotor Pro Cycling

Other teams

- Catema.cat
- Club Cycliste Le Boulou
- DN Dames Bio Frais
- DN-17 Nouvelle Aquitaine
- Hyundai Koryo Car
- Maaslandster Veris CCN
- Swaboladies.nl
- Team Stuttgart
- Torelli–Kuota–Torelli

National teams

- Belgium

== Route ==
List of stages
Stage	Date	Course	Distance	Type	Winner
1	22 February	Ròtova to Gandia	118 km (73.3 mi)	Hilly stage	Hannah Barnes (GBR)
2	23 February	Castellón de la Plana to Villarreal	115 km (71.5 mi)	Hilly stage	Marta Bastianelli (ITA)
3	24 February	Sagunto to Valencia	137 km (85.1 mi)	Hilly stage	Nicole Steigenga (NED)
4	25 February	Benidorm to Benidorm	118 km (73.3 mi)	Hilly stage	Hannah Barnes (GBR)

== Stages ==
=== Stage 1 ===
22 February 2018 — Ròtova to Gandia, 118 km (73.3 mi)

Result of Stage 1
Rank	Rider	Team	Time
1	Hannah Barnes (GBR)	Canyon–SRAM	3h 06' 21"
2	Ashleigh Moolman (RSA)	Cervélo–Bigla Pro Cycling	+ 0"
3	Marta Bastianelli (ITA)	Alé–Cipollini	+ 0"
4	Alicia González Blanco (ESP)	Movistar Team	+ 0"
5	Eugénie Duval (FRA)	FDJ Nouvelle-Aquitaine Futuroscope	+ 0"
6	Pauline Ferrand-Prévot (FRA)	Canyon–SRAM	+ 0"
7	Katarzyna Niewiadoma (POL)	Canyon–SRAM	+ 0"
8	Abby-Mae Parkinson (GBR)	Trek–Drops	+ 0"
9	Cecilie Uttrup Ludwig (DEN)	Cervélo–Bigla Pro Cycling	+ 0"
10	Tayler Wiles (USA)	Trek–Drops	+ 3"

General classification after Stage 1
Rank	Rider	Team	Time
1	Hannah Barnes (GBR)	Canyon–SRAM	3h 06' 11"
2	Ashleigh Moolman (RSA)	Cervélo–Bigla Pro Cycling	+ 4"
3	Marta Bastianelli (ITA)	Alé–Cipollini	+ 6"
4	Alicia González Blanco (ESP)	Movistar Team	+ 10"
5	Eugénie Duval (FRA)	FDJ Nouvelle-Aquitaine Futuroscope	+ 10"
6	Pauline Ferrand-Prévot (FRA)	Canyon–SRAM	+ 10"
7	Katarzyna Niewiadoma (POL)	Canyon–SRAM	+ 10"
8	Abby-Mae Parkinson (GBR)	Trek–Drops	+ 10"
9	Cecilie Uttrup Ludwig (DEN)	Cervélo–Bigla Pro Cycling	+ 10"
10	Tayler Wiles (USA)	Trek–Drops	+ 13"

=== Stage 2 ===
23 February 2018 — Castellón de la Plana to Villarreal, 115 km (71.5 mi)

Result of Stage 2
Rank	Rider	Team	Time
1	Marta Bastianelli (ITA)	Alé–Cipollini	3h 00' 35"
2	Hannah Barnes (GBR)	Canyon–SRAM	+ 0"
3	Alicia González Blanco (ESP)	Movistar Team	+ 0"
4	Eugénie Duval (FRA)	FDJ Nouvelle-Aquitaine Futuroscope	+ 0"
5	Margarita Victoria García (ESP)	Movistar Team	+ 0"
6	Lourdes Oyarbide (ESP)	Movistar Team	+ 0"
7	Sofia Rodríguez (ESP)	Sopela Women's Team	+ 0"
8	Ashleigh Moolman (RSA)	Cervélo–Bigla Pro Cycling	+ 0"
9	Alba Teruel Ribes (ESP)	Movistar Team	+ 0"
10	Kathrin Schweinberger (AUT)	Health Mate–Cyclelive Team	+ 0"

General classification after Stage 2
Rank	Rider	Team	Time
1	Hannah Barnes (GBR)	Canyon–SRAM	6h 06' 39"
2	Marta Bastianelli (ITA)	Alé–Cipollini	+ 3"
3	Ashleigh Moolman (RSA)	Cervélo–Bigla Pro Cycling	+ 11"
4	Alicia González Blanco (ESP)	Movistar Team	+ 13"
5	Cecilie Uttrup Ludwig (DEN)	Cervélo–Bigla Pro Cycling	+ 16"
6	Eugénie Duval (FRA)	FDJ Nouvelle-Aquitaine Futuroscope	+ 17"
7	Pauline Ferrand-Prévot (FRA)	Canyon–SRAM	+ 17"
8	Abby-Mae Parkinson (GBR)	Trek–Drops	+ 17"
9	Katarzyna Niewiadoma (POL)	Canyon–SRAM	+ 17"
10	Margarita Victoria García (ESP)	Movistar Team	+ 18"

=== Stage 3 ===
24 February 2018 — Sagunto to Valencia, 137 km (85.1 mi)

Result of Stage 3
Rank	Rider	Team	Time
1	Nicole Steigenga (NED)	Swaboladies.nl	3h 33' 11"
2	Lotta Lepistö (FIN)	Cervélo–Bigla Pro Cycling	+ 8"
3	Marta Bastianelli (ITA)	Alé–Cipollini	+ 8"
4	Chiara Consonni (ITA)	Valcar–PBM	+ 8"
5	Maria Vittoria Sperotto (ITA)	Bepink	+ 8"
6	Hannah Barnes (GBR)	Canyon–SRAM	+ 8"
7	Sofia Bertizzolo (ITA)	Astana	+ 8"
8	Ashleigh Moolman (RSA)	Cervélo–Bigla Pro Cycling	+ 8"
9	Alicia González Blanco (ESP)	Movistar Team	+ 8"
10	María Martins (POR)	Sopela Women's Team	+ 8"

General classification after Stage 3
Rank	Rider	Team	Time
1	Marta Bastianelli (ITA)	Alé–Cipollini	9h 39' 57"
2	Hannah Barnes (GBR)	Canyon–SRAM	+ 1"
3	Ashleigh Moolman (RSA)	Cervélo–Bigla Pro Cycling	+ 12"
4	Alicia González Blanco (ESP)	Movistar Team	+ 14"
5	Cecilie Uttrup Ludwig (DEN)	Cervélo–Bigla Pro Cycling	+ 17"
6	Eugénie Duval (FRA)	FDJ Nouvelle-Aquitaine Futuroscope	+ 18"
7	Abby-Mae Parkinson (GBR)	Trek–Drops	+ 18"
8	Pauline Ferrand-Prévot (FRA)	Canyon–SRAM	+ 18"
9	Katarzyna Niewiadoma (POL)	Canyon–SRAM	+ 18"
10	Margarita Victoria García (ESP)	Movistar Team	+ 19"

=== Stage 4 ===
25 February 2018 — Benidorm to Benidorm, 118 km (73.3 mi)

Result of Stage 4
Rank	Rider	Team	Time
1	Hannah Barnes (GBR)	Canyon–SRAM	3h 07' 29"
2	Ashleigh Moolman (RSA)	Cervélo–Bigla Pro Cycling	+ 0"
3	Alicia González Blanco (ESP)	Movistar Team	+ 0"
4	Shara Gillow (AUS)	FDJ Nouvelle-Aquitaine Futuroscope	+ 0"
5	Margarita Victoria García (ESP)	Movistar Team	+ 0"
6	Eugénie Duval (FRA)	FDJ Nouvelle-Aquitaine Futuroscope	+ 0"
7	Cecilie Uttrup Ludwig (DEN)	Cervélo–Bigla Pro Cycling	+ 0"
8	Pauline Ferrand-Prévot (FRA)	Canyon–SRAM	+ 3"
9	Katarzyna Niewiadoma (POL)	Canyon–SRAM	+ 3"
10	Marta Bastianelli (ITA)	Alé–Cipollini	+ 2' 39"

Final general classification
Rank	Rider	Team	Time
1	Hannah Barnes (GBR)	Canyon–SRAM	12h 47' 11"
2	Ashleigh Moolman (RSA)	Cervélo–Bigla Pro Cycling	+ 17"
3	Alicia González Blanco (ESP)	Movistar Team	+ 25"
4	Cecilie Uttrup Ludwig (DEN)	Cervélo–Bigla Pro Cycling	+ 32"
5	Eugénie Duval (FRA)	FDJ Nouvelle-Aquitaine Futuroscope	+ 33"
6	Margarita Victoria García (ESP)	Movistar Team	+ 34"
7	Katarzyna Niewiadoma (POL)	Canyon–SRAM	+ 34"
8	Shara Gillow (AUS)	FDJ Nouvelle-Aquitaine Futuroscope	+ 36"
9	Pauline Ferrand-Prévot (FRA)	Canyon–SRAM	+ 36"
10	Marta Bastianelli (ITA)	Alé–Cipollini	+ 2' 54"

== Classification leadership table ==
Stage	Winner	General classification	Sprint classification	Mountains classification	Young rider classification	Valencian rider classification	Teams classification
1	Hannah Barnes	Hannah Barnes	Belle De Gast	Ashleigh Moolman	Abby-Mae Parkinson	Alba Teruel Ribes	Canyon–SRAM
2	Marta Bastianelli	Hannah Barnes	Belle De Gast	Ashleigh Moolman	Abby-Mae Parkinson	Sofia Rodríguez	Canyon–SRAM
3	Nicole Steigenga	Marta Bastianelli	Belle De Gast	Ashleigh Moolman	Abby-Mae Parkinson	Sofia Rodríguez	Canyon–SRAM
4	Hannah Barnes	Hannah Barnes	Belle De Gast	Ashleigh Moolman	Abby-Mae Parkinson	Cristina Martínez	Canyon–SRAM
Final		Hannah Barnes	Belle De Gast	Ashleigh Moolman	Abby-Mae Parkinson	Cristina Martínez	Canyon–SRAM
