= Charlotte Bravard =

French cyclist

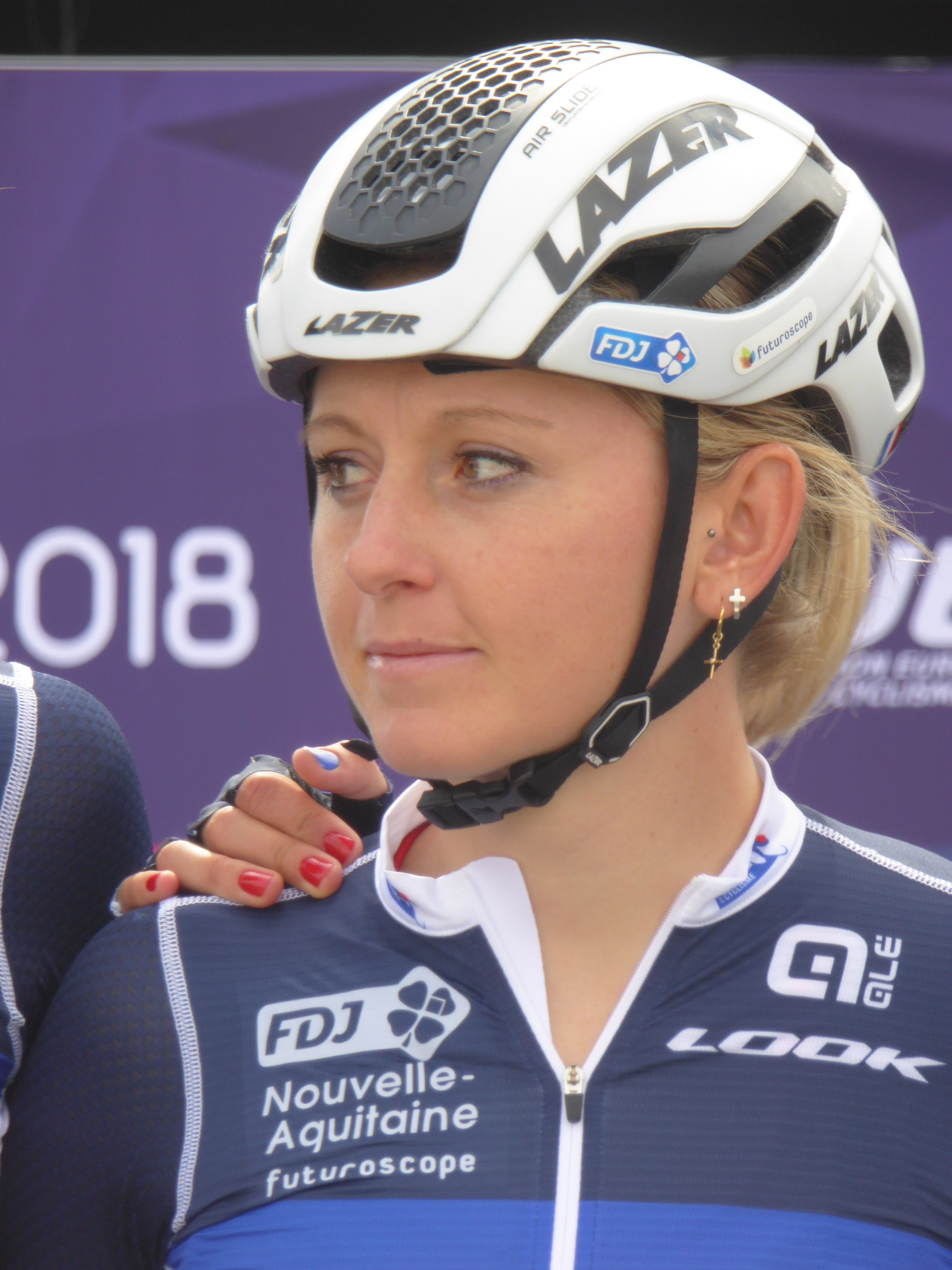
- Bravard at the 2018 European Road Cycling Championships.

Personal information
- Full name: Charlotte Bravard
- Born: 12 January 1992 (age 34) Dreux, Eure-et-Loir, France

Cycling career
- Sport: Cycling
- Current team: St. Michel–Preference Home–Auber93
- Discipline: Road
- Role: Rider (retired); Directeur sportif

Amateur team
- 2020: St. Michel–Auber93

Professional teams
- 2011–2012: Juvederm–Specialized
- 2014–2019: Poitou-Charentes.Futuroscope.86

Managerial team
- 2021–: St. Michel–Auber93

Charlotte Bravard (born 12 January 1992) is a French former professional racing cyclist, who rode professionally between 2011 and 2019 for the Specialized Mazda SGC and FDJ Nouvelle-Aquitaine Futuroscope teams. Bravard was the winner of the 2017 French National Road Race Championships. She currently works as a directeur sportif for UCI Women's Continental Team St. Michel–Preference Home–Auber93.

== Personal life ==
Bravard's older sister Mélanie Bravard also competed professionally as a cyclist. In 2020, Bravard gave birth to a son – with her partner and fellow cyclist, Baptiste Bleier.

== Major results ==
2014
3rd Grand Prix de Plumelec-Morbihan Dames
7th Overall Tour de Bretagne Féminin
8th Road race, UEC European Under-23 Road Championships
2015
4th Grand Prix de Plumelec-Morbihan Dames
2017
1st Road race, National Road Championships
9th Chrono des Nations

== See also ==
- List of 2015 UCI Women's Teams and riders
