= Eline Jansen (cyclist) =

Dutch cyclist (born 2002)

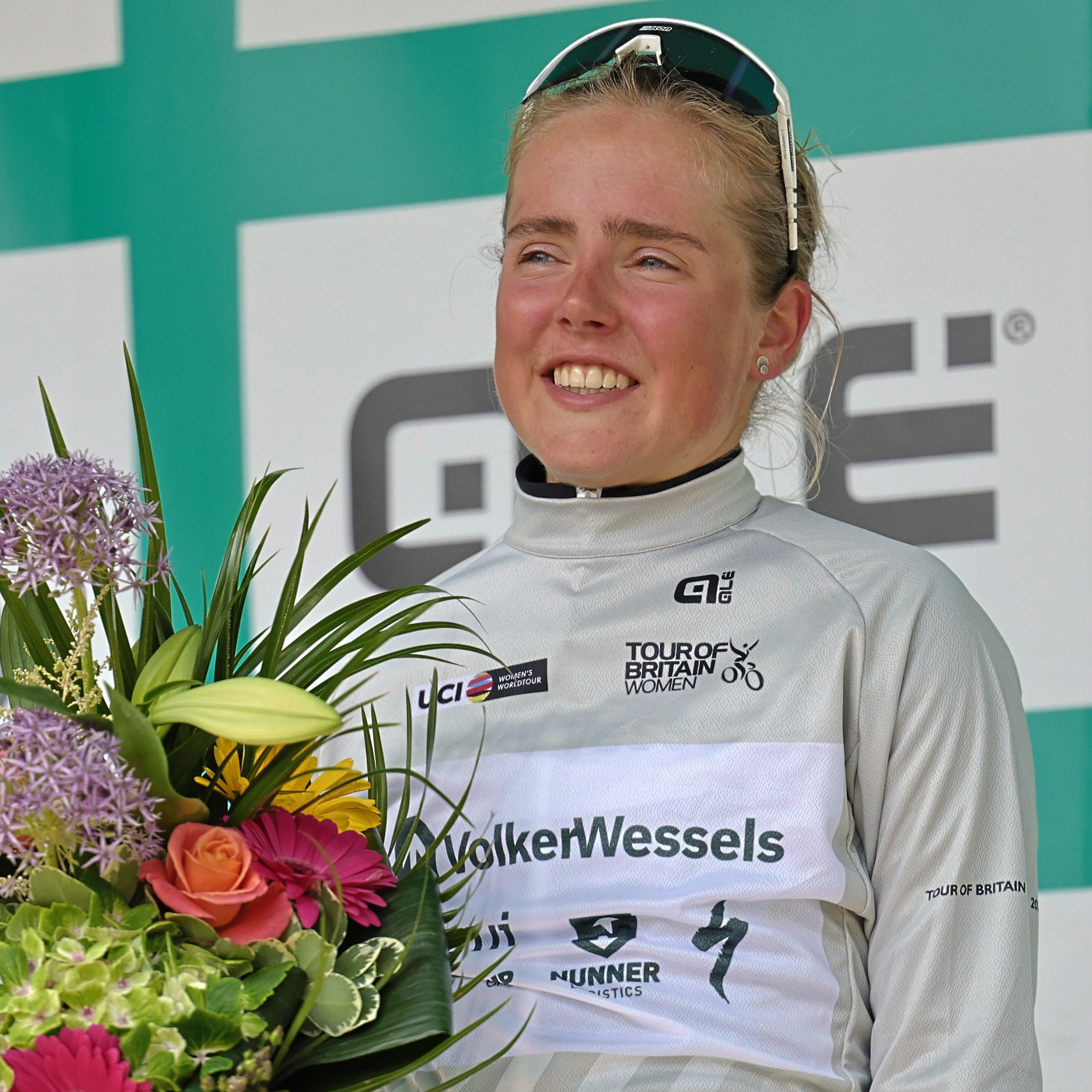
- Jansen at the 2024 Tour of Britain Women

Personal information
- Born: 8 March 2002 (age 24) Deventer, Netherlands

Cycling career
- Sport: Cycling
- Current team: VolkerWessels Women Cyclingteam
- Discipline: Road
- Role: Rider

Amateur team
- 2023: WV Schijndel

Professional team
- 2024–: VolkerWessels Women Cyclingteam

Eline Jansen (born 8 March 2002) is a Dutch professional speed skater and cyclist, who rides for UCI Women's ProTeam VolkerWessels Women Cyclingteam.

As an infant, Jansen suffered from a hip condition requiring a pelvic osteotomy surgery, with her doctors considering it unlikely she would be able to walk. She pursued speed skating from an early age, picking up cycling as additional training.

Jansen transitioned fully from skating to cycling in 2024. In her debut season as a professional with VolkerWessels Women Cyclingteam, she won the young rider classification at the Tour of Britain Women, earning a long-term contract extension until 2027.

In 2025, after a strong classics season with five top 20 results in one-day races, Jansen won La Classique Morbihan in an uphill sprint finish

Jansen was selected to ride in the 2026 Tour de France Femmes. On the final stage, Jansen was mistakenly directed off-course by race organizers, eventually finishing just five seconds within the time limit. In August, Jansen signed a contract with Team SD Worx–Protime for the 2027 and 2028 seasons.

== Major results ==
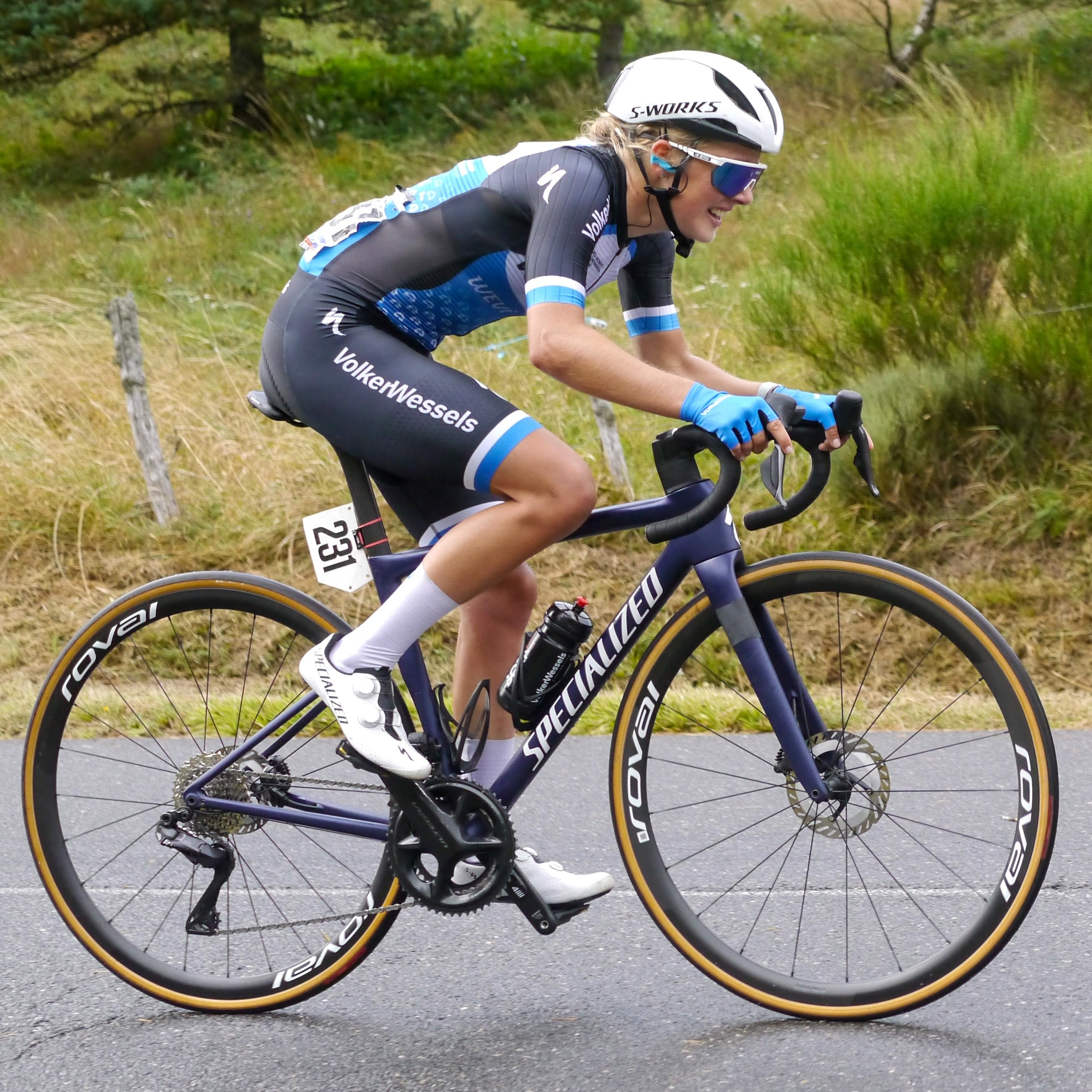
Jansen riding at the 2024 Tour Cycliste Féminin International de l'Ardèche, where she won a stage

2023
3rd Overall Watersley Women's Challenge
2024
1st Stage 6 Tour Cycliste Féminin International de l'Ardèche
3rd La Picto - Charentaise
6th Overall Tour of Britain

1st Youth classification

9th Kreiz Breizh Elites Dames
10th Grand Prix Stuttgart & Region
2025
1st La Classique Morbihan
4th Grand Prix du Morbihan Femmes
2026
1st Grand Prix du Morbihan Femmes
1st Stage 3 Tour Féminin International des Pyrénées
5th Dwars door Vlaanderen
