= Marion Sicot =

French cyclist

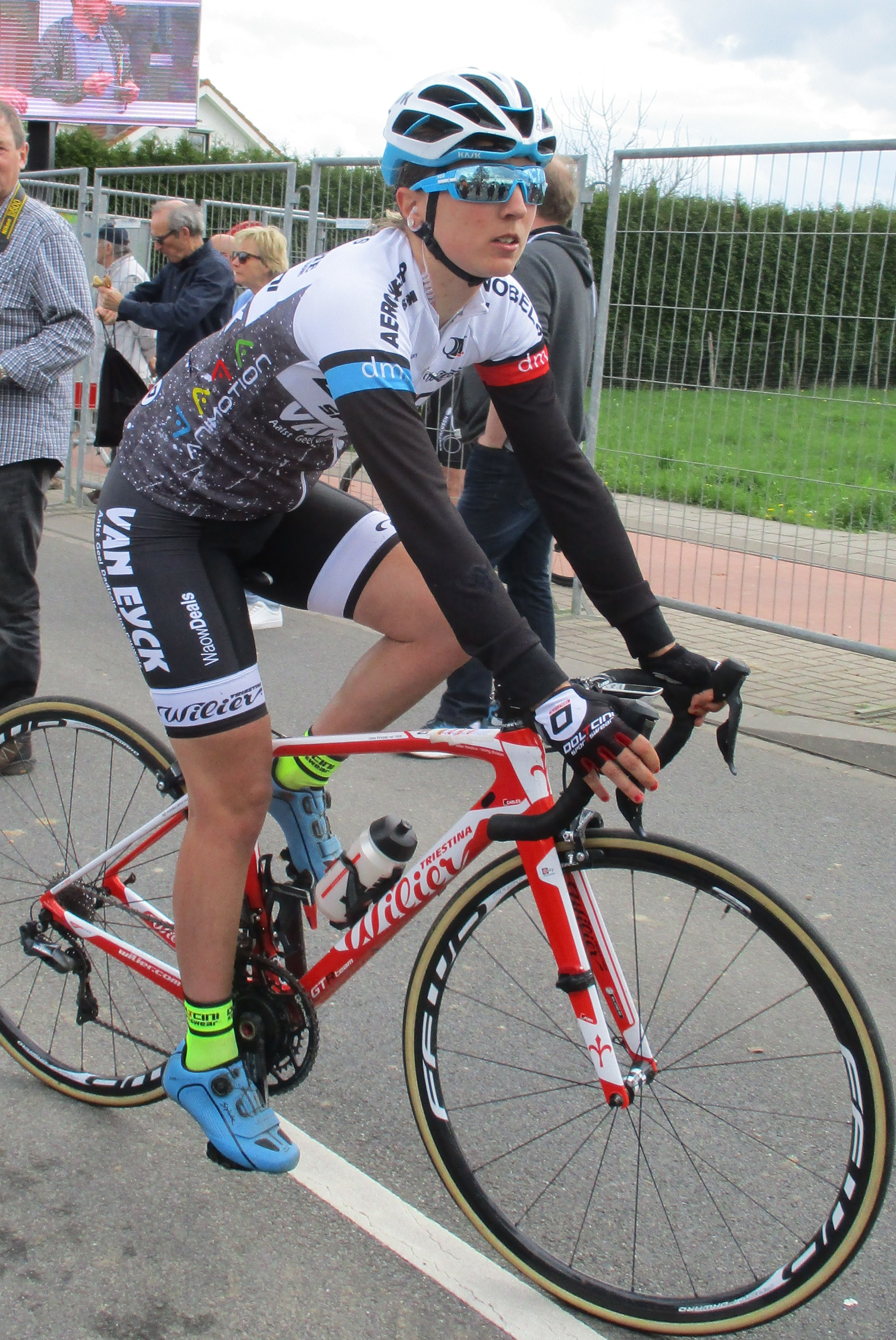
- Sicot in 2018

Personal information
- Full name: Marion Sicot
- Born: 24 June 1992 (age 34) Orléans, France

Cycling career
- Sport: Cycling
- Current team: Suspended
- Discipline: Road
- Role: Rider

Amateur teams
- 2014–2015: Team Féminin Région Centre
- 2017: VC St Julien en Genevois
- 2018: St. Michel–Auber93 (guest)
- 2018: VC St Julien en Genevois (guest)
- 2022: Team Bertin Cognac Sport'invest

Professional teams
- 2013: Bourgogne–Pro Dialog
- 2016: Servetto Footon
- 2018–2019: Doltcini–Van Eyck Sport

Marion Sicot (French: [maʁjɔ̃ siko]; born 24 June 1992) is a French former racing cyclist. She finished ninth at the 2014 Grand Prix de Plumelec-Morbihan Dames and seventh at the 2015 Grand Prix de Plumelec-Morbihan Dames.

Sicot served a four-year ban from 2019 to 2024 following a positive test for erythropoietin (EPO)., In January 2025, it was reported that Sicot had been issued with 10-month suspended prison sentence and a €5,000 fine by a court in Montargis, France for import and possession of doping products. Sicot tested positive for EPO in a test carried out by the AFLD – the Agence Française de Lutte contre le Dopage (English: French Anti-Doping Agency) – at the French National Time Trial Championships on 27 June 2019 and was provisionally suspended on 18 July 2019. She was handed a two-year suspension by the AFLD, a decision made by its Sanctions Commission on 16 December 2020. This ban was extended to four years in March 2022.

In June 2021, Marc Bracke, the director general and sports director of Doltcini–Van Eyck–Proximus was banned from cycling for three years by UCI for sexual harassment of riders on the team, including Sicot.
