= Abby-Mae Parkinson =

British cyclist

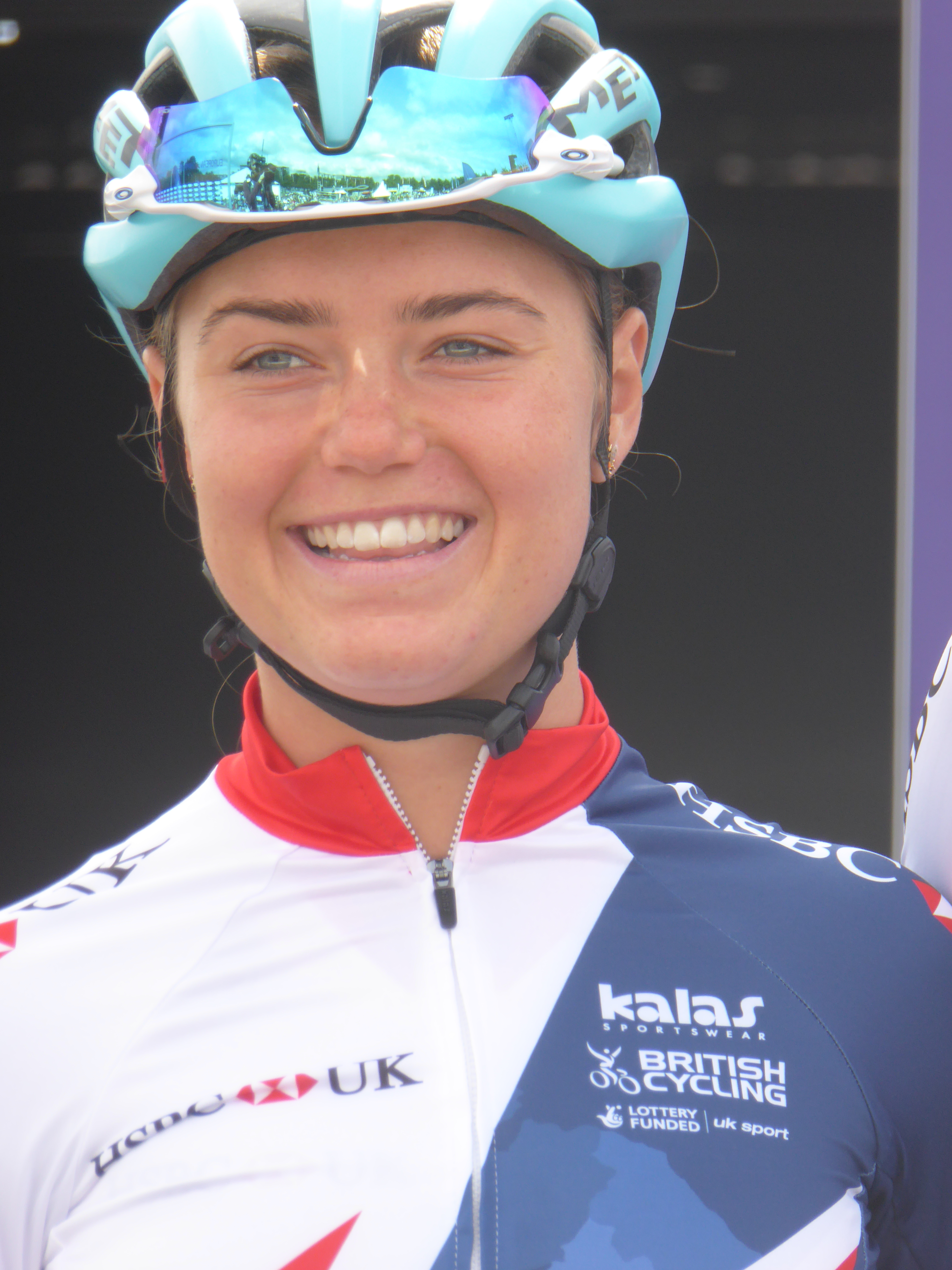
- Parkinson at the 2018 European Road Cycling Championships.

Personal information
- Full name: Abby-Mae Parkinson
- Born: 30 July 1997 (age 29) Dewsbury, West Yorkshire, England

Cycling career
- Sport: Cycling
- Current team: Retired
- Discipline: Road
- Role: Rider

Amateur teams
- 2009: Holme Valley Wheelers
- 2010: Aire Valley Racing Team
- 2011–2014: RST Racing Team
- 2015: Team Giordana–Triton
- 2016: 3RT

Professional teams
- 2016: Servetto Footon
- 2017–2019: Drops
- 2019–2021: Trinity Racing (cyclo-cross)
- 2020–2022: Lotto–Soudal Ladies (road)

Abby-Mae Parkinson (born 30 July 1997) is an English former professional racing cyclist, who rode professionally in road racing and cyclo-cross between 2016 and 2022 for UCI Women's Teams Servetto Footon and Drops, UCI Cyclo-cross Team Trinity Racing and UCI Women's Continental Team Lotto–Soudal Ladies. She rode in the women's road race at the 2016 UCI Road World Championships, finishing in 79th place, and she won the young rider classification at the 2018 Setmana Ciclista Valenciana.

== Early and personal life ==
Parkinson attended Bradford Grammar School from the age of seven until her completion of A-levels in biology, geography and physical education. Her mother Lisa Brambani is a former racing cyclist who won a silver medal in the road race at the 1990 Commonwealth Games.
