= 2024 Tour of Britain Women =

2024 UCI Women's World Tour, race 19 of 27
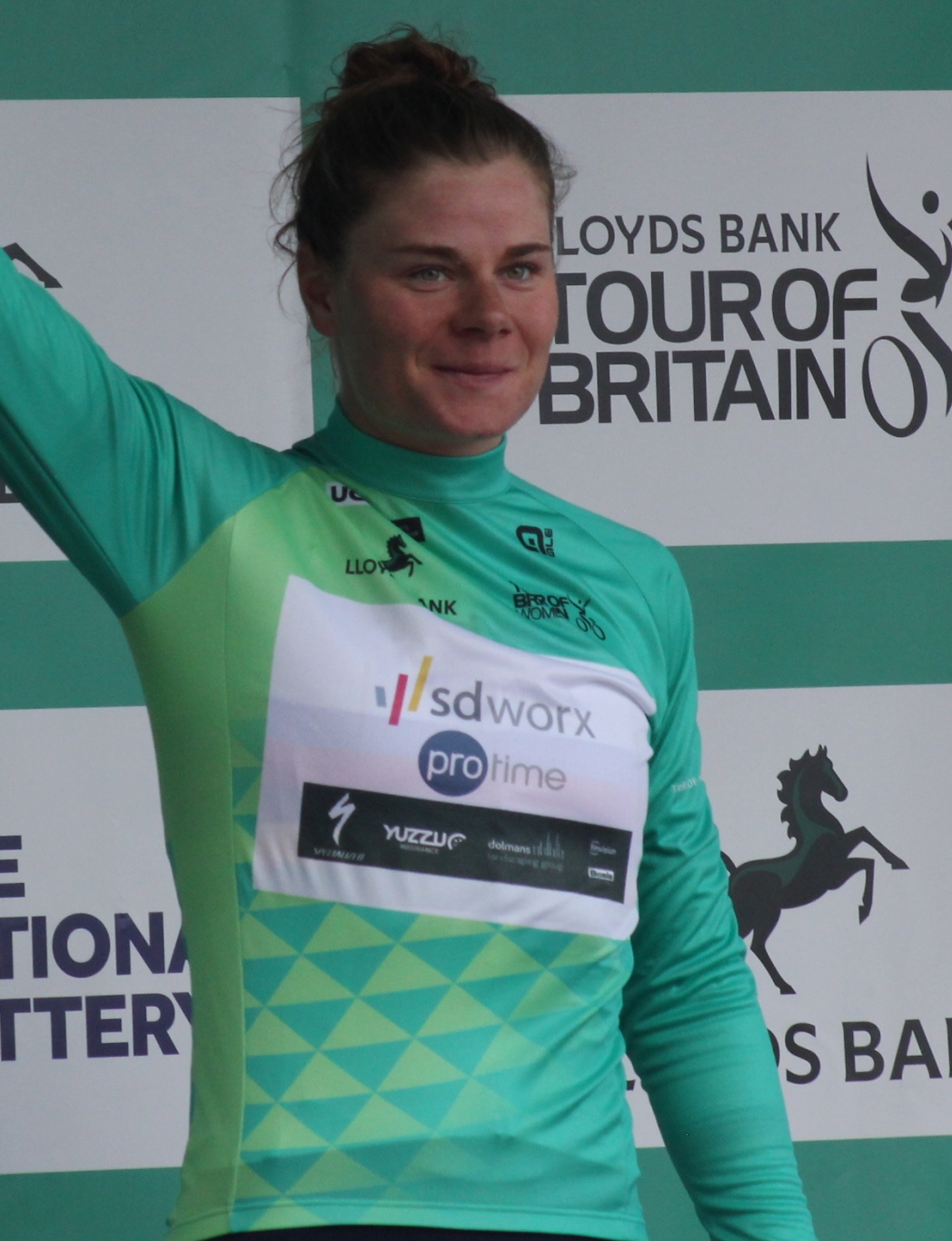
- Lotte Kopecky, race winner

Race details
- Dates: 6–9 June 2024
- Stages: 4
- Distance: 488.5 km (303.5 mi)
- Winning time: 13h 03' 40"

Results
Jersey awarded to the overall winner	Winner	Lotte Kopecky (BEL)	(Team SD Worx–Protime)
	Second	Anna Henderson (GBR)	(Great Britain)
	Third	Christine Majerus (LUX)	(Team SD Worx–Protime)
Jersey awarded to the points classification winner	Points	Lotte Kopecky (BEL)	(Team SD Worx–Protime)
Jersey awarded to the mountains classification winner	Mountains	Elizabeth Deignan (GBR)	(Great Britain)
Jersey awarded to the young rider classification winner	Young rider	Eline Jansen (NED)	(VolkerWessels Women Cyclingteam)
	Team	(Netherlands) Team SD Worx–Protime	

The 2024 Tour of Britain Women was a British women's cycle stage held in Great Britain, as part of the UCI Women's World Tour. Taking place between 6 and 9 June, the race was the ninth edition of the Tour of Britain Women.

The race was won by Belgian rider Lotte Kopecky of Team SD Worx–Protime, with Kopecky also winning the points classification and retaking the lead in the UCI Women's World Tour classification.

== Teams ==
Four UCI Women's WorldTeams, ten UCI Women's Continental Teams and the British national team took part in the race.

UCI Women's WorldTeams

- Human Powered Health
- Liv AlUla Jayco
- Team dsm–firmenich PostNL
- Team SD Worx–Protime

UCI Women's Continental Teams

- Alba Development Road Team
- Cofidis
- DAS–Hutchinson–Brother–UK
- Doltcini O'Shea
- Hess Cycling Team
- Lifeplus Wahoo
- Pro-Noctis–200° Coffee–Hargreaves Contracting
- St. Michel–Mavic–Auber93
- Torelli
- VolkerWessels Women Cyclingteam

National Teams

- Great Britain

== Route and stages ==
Stage characteristics
Stage	Date	Course	Distance	Type	Stage winner
1	6 June	Welshpool to Llandudno	142.4 km (88.5 mi)	Hilly stage	Lotte Kopecky (BEL)
2	7 June	Wrexham to Wrexham	140.1 km (87.1 mi)	Hilly stage	Lotte Kopecky (BEL)
3	8 June	Warrington to Warrington	106.8 km (66.4 mi)	Flat stage	Lorena Wiebes (NED)
4	9 June	Manchester to Manchester	99.2 km (61.6 mi)	Hilly stage	Ruby Roseman-Gannon (AUS)
Total			488.5 km (303.5 mi)		

== Stages ==
=== Stage 1 ===
6 June 2024 — Welshpool to Llandudno, 142.4 km (88.5 mi)

Stage 1 Result
Rank	Rider	Team	Time
1	Lotte Kopecky (BEL)	Team SD Worx–Protime	4h 04' 18"
2	Letizia Paternoster (ITA)	Liv AlUla Jayco	+ 0"
3	Pfeiffer Georgi (GBR)	Team dsm–firmenich PostNL	+ 0"
4	Elizabeth Deignan (GBR)	Great Britain	+ 0"
5	Eline Jansen (NED)	VolkerWessels Women Cyclingteam	+ 0"
6	Anna Henderson (GBR)	Great Britain	+ 0"
7	Victorie Guilman (FRA)	St. Michel–Mavic–Auber93	+ 0"
8	Christine Majerus (LUX)	Team SD Worx–Protime	+ 0"
9	Ruby Roseman-Gannon (AUS)	Liv AlUla Jayco	+ 0"
10	Lucy Lee (GBR)	DAS–Hutchinson–Brother–UK	+ 3' 49"

General classification after Stage 1
Rank	Rider	Team	Time
1	Lotte Kopecky (BEL)	Team SD Worx–Protime	4h 04' 06"
2	Letizia Paternoster (ITA)	Liv AlUla Jayco	+ 3"
3	Pfeiffer Georgi (GBR)	Team dsm–firmenich PostNL	+ 7"
4	Elizabeth Deignan (GBR)	Great Britain	+ 12"
5	Eline Jansen (NED)	VolkerWessels Women Cyclingteam	+ 12"
6	Anna Henderson (GBR)	Great Britain	+ 12"
7	Victorie Guilman (FRA)	St. Michel–Mavic–Auber93	+ 12"
8	Christine Majerus (LUX)	Team SD Worx–Protime	+ 12"
9	Ruby Roseman-Gannon (AUS)	Liv AlUla Jayco	+ 12"
10	Lucy Lee (GBR)	DAS–Hutchinson–Brother–UK	+ 4' 01"

=== Stage 2 ===
7 June 2024 — Wrexham to Wrexham, 140.1 km (87.1 mi)

Stage 2 Result
Rank	Rider	Team	Time
1	Lotte Kopecky (BEL)	Team SD Worx–Protime	3h 37' 12"
2	Anna Henderson (GBR)	Great Britain	+ 0"
3	Lorena Wiebes (NED)	Team SD Worx–Protime	+ 20"
4	Letizia Paternoster (ITA)	Liv AlUla Jayco	+ 20"
5	Pfeiffer Georgi (GBR)	Team dsm–firmenich PostNL	+ 20"
6	Sarah Roy (AUS)	Cofidis	+ 20"
7	Margot Vanpachtenbeke (BEL)	VolkerWessels Women Cyclingteam	+ 20"
8	Josie Talbot (AUS)	Cofidis	+ 20"
9	Elizabeth Deignan (GBR)	Great Britain	+ 20"
10	Eline Jansen (NED)	VolkerWessels Women Cyclingteam	+ 20"

General classification after Stage 2
Rank	Rider	Team	Time
1	Lotte Kopecky (BEL)	Team SD Worx–Protime	7h 41' 07"
2	Anna Henderson (GBR)	Great Britain	+ 17"
3	Letizia Paternoster (ITA)	Liv AlUla Jayco	+ 34"
4	Pfeiffer Georgi (GBR)	Team dsm–firmenich PostNL	+ 38"
5	Elizabeth Deignan (GBR)	Great Britain	+ 43"
6	Eline Jansen (NED)	VolkerWessels Women Cyclingteam	+ 43"
7	Victorie Guilman (FRA)	St. Michel–Mavic–Auber93	+ 43"
8	Christine Majerus (LUX)	Team SD Worx–Protime	+ 43"
9	Ruby Roseman-Gannon (AUS)	Liv AlUla Jayco	+ 3' 01"
10	Lorena Wiebes (NED)	Team SD Worx–Protime	+ 4' 29"

=== Stage 3 ===
8 June 2024 — Warrington to Warrington, 106.8 km (66.4 mi)

Stage 3 Result
Rank	Rider	Team	Time
1	Lorena Wiebes (NED)	Team SD Worx–Protime	2h 44' 42"
2	Charlotte Kool (NED)	Team dsm–firmenich PostNL	+ 0"
3	Georgia Baker (AUS)	Liv AlUla Jayco	+ 0"
4	Rachele Barbieri (ITA)	Team dsm–firmenich PostNL	+ 0"
5	Flora Perkins (GBR)	Great Britain	+ 0"
6	Marjolein van 't Geloof (NED)	Hess Cycling Team	+ 0"
7	Lotte Kopecky (BEL)	Team SD Worx–Protime	+ 0"
8	Letizia Paternoster (ITA)	Liv AlUla Jayco	+ 0"
9	Roxane Fournier (FRA)	St. Michel–Mavic–Auber93	+ 0"
10	Alicia González (ESP)	Lifeplus Wahoo	+ 0"

General classification after Stage 3
Rank	Rider	Team	Time
1	Lotte Kopecky (BEL)	Team SD Worx–Protime	10h 25' 49"
2	Anna Henderson (GBR)	Great Britain	+ 17"
3	Letizia Paternoster (ITA)	Liv AlUla Jayco	+ 32"
4	Pfeiffer Georgi (GBR)	Team dsm–firmenich PostNL	+ 38"
5	Eline Jansen (NED)	VolkerWessels Women Cyclingteam	+ 43"
6	Elizabeth Deignan (GBR)	Great Britain	+ 43"
7	Christine Majerus (LUX)	Team SD Worx–Protime	+ 43"
8	Victorie Guilman (FRA)	St. Michel–Mavic–Auber93	+ 43"
9	Ruby Roseman-Gannon (AUS)	Liv AlUla Jayco	+ 3' 00"
10	Lorena Wiebes (NED)	Team SD Worx–Protime	+ 4' 19"

=== Stage 4 ===
9 June 2024 — Manchester to Manchester, 99.2 km (61.6 mi)

Stage 4 Result
Rank	Rider	Team	Time
1	Ruby Roseman-Gannon (AUS)	Liv AlUla Jayco	2h 37' 51"
2	Christine Majerus (LUX)	Team SD Worx–Protime	+ 0"
3	Lorena Wiebes (NED)	Team SD Worx–Protime	+ 0"
4	Lotte Kopecky (BEL)	Team SD Worx–Protime	+ 0"
5	Eline Jansen (NED)	VolkerWessels Women Cyclingteam	+ 0"
6	Pfeiffer Georgi (GBR)	Team dsm–firmenich PostNL	+ 0"
7	Flora Perkins (GBR)	Great Britain	+ 0"
8	Elinor Barker (GBR)	Great Britain	+ 0"
9	Josie Talbot (AUS)	Cofidis	+ 0"
10	Anna Henderson (GBR)	Great Britain	+ 0"

General classification after Stage 4
Rank	Rider	Team	Time
1	Lotte Kopecky (BEL)	Team SD Worx–Protime	13h 03' 40"
2	Anna Henderson (GBR)	Great Britain	+ 17"
3	Christine Majerus (LUX)	Team SD Worx–Protime	+ 34"
4	Pfeiffer Georgi (GBR)	Team dsm–firmenich PostNL	+ 38"
5	Letizia Paternoster (ITA)	Liv AlUla Jayco	+ 40"
6	Eline Jansen (NED)	VolkerWessels Women Cyclingteam	+ 43"
7	Elizabeth Deignan (GBR)	Great Britain	+ 46"
8	Victorie Guilman (FRA)	St. Michel–Mavic–Auber93	+ 46"
9	Ruby Roseman-Gannon (AUS)	Liv AlUla Jayco	+ 2' 50"
10	Lorena Wiebes (NED)	Team SD Worx–Protime	+ 4' 14"

== Classification leadership table ==
Classification leadership by stage
Stage	Winner	General classification	Points classification	Mountains classification	Young rider classification	Team classification
1	Lotte Kopecky	Lotte Kopecky	Lotte Kopecky	Elizabeth Deignan	Eline Jansen	Team SD Worx–Protime
2	Lotte Kopecky	Lotte Kopecky	Lotte Kopecky	Elizabeth Deignan	Eline Jansen	Team SD Worx–Protime
3	Lorena Wiebes	Lotte Kopecky	Lotte Kopecky	Elizabeth Deignan	Eline Jansen	Team SD Worx–Protime
4	Ruby Roseman-Gannon	Lotte Kopecky	Lotte Kopecky	Elizabeth Deignan	Eline Jansen	Team SD Worx–Protime
Final		Lotte Kopecky	Lotte Kopecky	Elizabeth Deignan	Eline Jansen	Team SD Worx–Protime

== Classification standings ==
Legend
Denotes the winner of the general classification	Denotes the winner of the mountains classification
Denotes the winner of the points classification	Denotes the winner of the young rider classification

=== General classification ===
Final general classification (1–10)
Rank	Rider	Team	Time
1	Lotte Kopecky (BEL)	Team SD Worx–Protime	13h 03' 40"
2	Anna Henderson (GBR)	Great Britain	+ 17"
3	Christine Majerus (LUX)	Team SD Worx–Protime	+ 34"
4	Pfeiffer Georgi (GBR)	Team dsm–firmenich PostNL	+ 38"
5	Letizia Paternoster (ITA)	Liv AlUla Jayco	+ 40"
6	Eline Jansen (NED)	VolkerWessels Women Cyclingteam	+ 43"
7	Elizabeth Deignan (GBR)	Great Britain	+ 46"
8	Victorie Guilman (FRA)	St. Michel–Mavic–Auber93	+ 46"
9	Ruby Roseman-Gannon (AUS)	Liv AlUla Jayco	+ 2' 50"
10	Lorena Wiebes (NED)	Team SD Worx–Protime	+ 4' 14"

=== Points classification ===
Final points classification (1–10)
Rank	Rider	Team	Points
1	Lotte Kopecky (BEL)	Team SD Worx–Protime	31
2	Lorena Wiebes (NED)	Team SD Worx–Protime	25
3	Letizia Paternoster (ITA)	Liv AlUla Jayco	20
4	Ruby Roseman-Gannon (AUS)	Liv AlUla Jayco	13
5	Christine Majerus (LUX)	Team SD Worx–Protime	12
6	Charlotte Kool (NED)	Team dsm–firmenich PostNL	10
7	Pfeiffer Georgi (GBR)	Team dsm–firmenich PostNL	9
8	Anna Henderson (GBR)	Great Britain	8
9	Franziska Koch (GER)	Team dsm–firmenich PostNL	4
10	Jo Tindley (GBR)	Pro-Noctis–200° Coffee–Hargreaves Contracting	4

=== Mountains classification ===
Final mountains classification (1–10)
Rank	Rider	Team	Points
1	Elizabeth Deignan (GBR)	Great Britain	45
2	Anna Henderson (GBR)	Great Britain	32
3	Lotte Kopecky (BEL)	Team SD Worx–Protime	29
4	Christine Majerus (LUX)	Team SD Worx–Protime	19
5	Lorena Wiebes (NED)	Team SD Worx–Protime	17
6	Pfeiffer Georgi (GBR)	Team dsm–firmenich PostNL	14
7	Heidi Franz (USA)	Lifeplus Wahoo	13
8	Letizia Paternoster (ITA)	Liv AlUla Jayco	13
9	Dilyxine Miermont (FRA)	St. Michel–Mavic–Auber93	13
10	Marion Bunel (FRA)	St. Michel–Mavic–Auber93	12

=== Young rider classification ===
Final young rider classification (1–10)
Rank	Rider	Team	Time
1	Eline Jansen (NED)	VolkerWessels Women Cyclingteam	13h 04' 23"
2	Flora Perkins (GBR)	Great Britain	+ 3' 57"
3	Abi Smith (GBR)	Team dsm–firmenich PostNL	+ 4' 12"
4	Grace Lister (GBR)	Hess Cycling Team	+ 7' 46"
5	Millie Couzens (GBR)	Great Britain	+ 8' 02"
6	Marion Bunel (FRA)	St. Michel–Mavic–Auber93	+ 11' 07"
7	Linda Zanetti (SUI)	Human Powered Health	+ 11' 17"
8	Eilidh Shaw (GBR)	Alba Development Road Team	+ 14' 31"
9	Camille Fahy (FRA)	St. Michel–Mavic–Auber93	+ 14' 44"
10	Caoimhe O'Brien (IRL)	DAS–Hutchinson–Brother–UK	+ 16' 18"

=== Team classification ===
Final team classification (1–10)
Rank	Team	Time
1	(Netherlands) Team SD Worx–Protime	39h 16' 39"
2	(United Kingdom) Great Britain	+ 0"
3	(Australia) Liv AlUla Jayco	+ 3' 20"
4	(France) St. Michel–Mavic–Auber93	+ 4' 54"
5	(Netherlands) VolkerWessels Women Cyclingteam	+ 11' 12"
6	(Netherlands) Team dsm–firmenich PostNL	+ 12' 06"
7	(France) Cofidis	+ 18' 59"
8	(United States) Human Powered Health	+ 26' 44"
9	(United Kingdom) Lifeplus Wahoo	+ 43' 52"
10	(United Kingdom) Pro-Noctis–200° Coffee–Hargreaves Contracting	+ 43' 52"
