= Andrea Thürig =

Swiss cyclist

Personal information
- Born: 12 March 1978 (age 48) Switzerland

Cycling career
- Sport: Cycling
- Discipline: Road cycling

Professional team
- 2008–2009: Bigla Cycling Team

Andrea Thürig (born 12 March 1978) is a road cyclist from Switzerland. She represented her nation at the 2008 UCI Road World Championships.
