= Bettina Kühn =

Swiss cyclist

Personal information
- Born: 7 August 1982 (age 44) Switzerland

Cycling career
- Sport: Cycling
- Discipline: Road cycling

Professional team
- 2008–2009: Bigla Cycling Team

Bettina Kühn (born 7 August 1982) is a road cyclist from Switzerland. She represented her nation at the 2005 UCI Road World Championships. She won silver at the 2009 Swiss National Road Race Championships. She rode for Bigla Cycling Team in 2008 and 2009. With the team she won the first stage team time trial of the 2009 Giro della Toscana Int. Femminile – Memorial Michela Fanini.
