= Karine Gautard-Roussel =

French cyclist

Personal information
- Born: 25 July 1984 (age 42) France

Cycling career
- Sport: Cycling
- Discipline: Road cycling

Professional team
- 2008–2009: Vienne Futuroscope

Karine Gautard-Roussel (born 25 July 1984) is a road cyclist from France. She represented her nation at the 2008 and 2009 UCI Road World Championships.

== Teams ==
2006–2009

Vienna Futuroscope (UCI)

2005

Team Pruneaux d'Agen (UCI)
