= Fien van Eynde =

Belgian cyclist

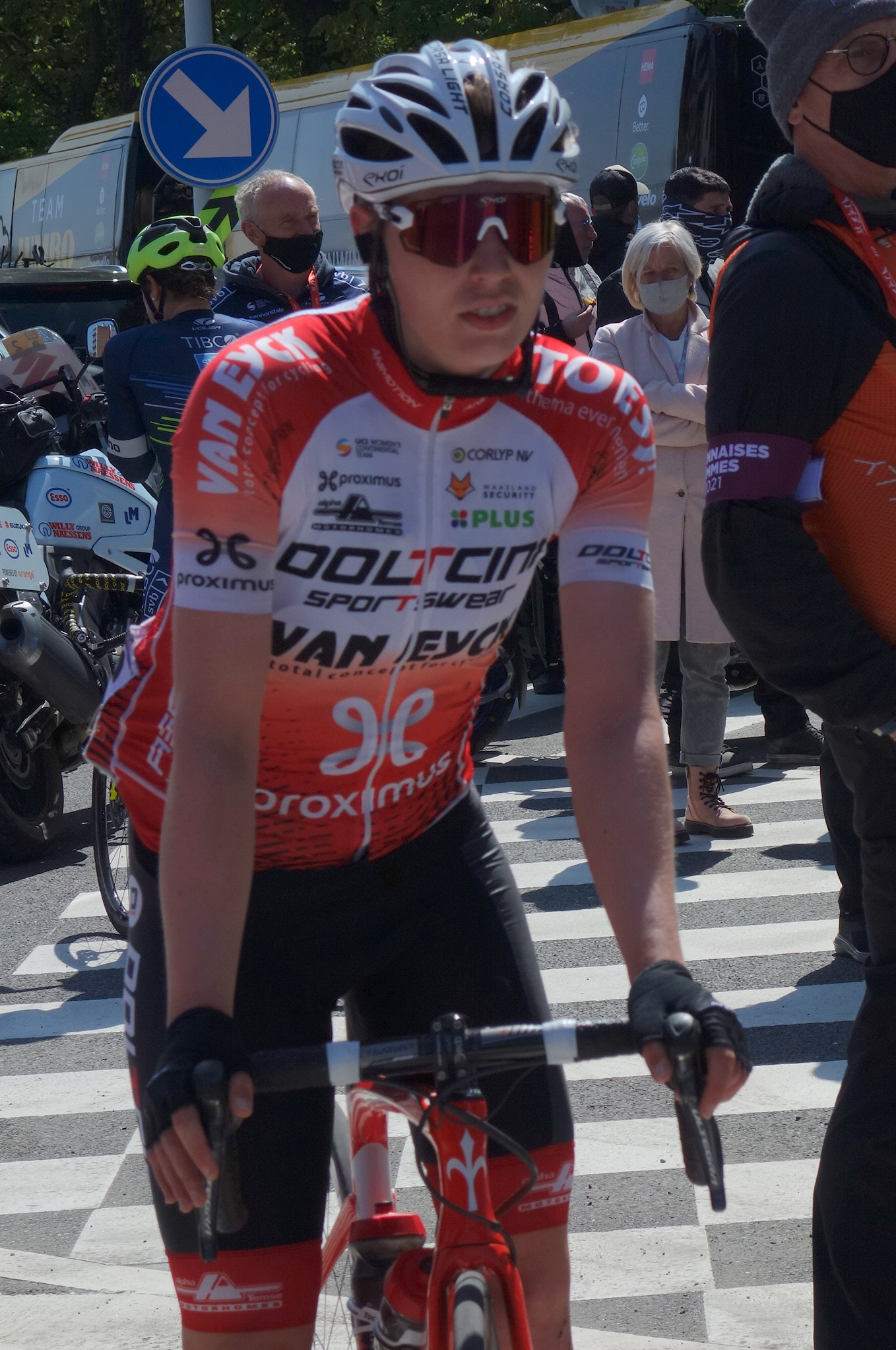
- Fien van Eynde in 2021

Personal information
- Full name: Fien van Eynde
- Born: 8 September 1998 (age 28)

Cycling career
- Sport: Cycling
- Current team: IBCT (cycling team)
- Discipline: Road
- Role: Rider

Amateur team
- 2019 – 2020: Kleur Op Maat–BNS Technics

Professional teams
- 2020 - 2021: Doltcini–Van Eyck–Proximus
- 2022: IBCT (cycling team)

Fien van Eynde (born 8 September 1998) is a Belgian professional racing cyclist, who currently rides for UCI Women's Continental Team Doltcini–Van Eyck–Proximus. She rode in the women's road race event at the 2020 UCI Road World Championships.

She won a silver medal in the 2022 Belgian National Road Race Championships.
