= Marina Jaunâtre =

French cyclist

Personal information
- Born: 20 May 1982 (age 44) Meaux, France

Cycling career
- Sport: Cycling
- Discipline: Road cycling

Professional team
- 2008-2009: Vienne Futuroscope

Marina Jaunâtre (born 20 May 1982) is a road cyclist from France. She represented her nation at the 2004, 2005, 2006 and 2007 UCI Road World Championships. A bad fall in July 2009 ended her career as a cyclist, but continued to be involved in amateur championships as a coach and trainer. She gave birth to her first child in January 2011.
