= Lucie Pader =

French racing cyclist (born 1992)

Personal information
- Born: 21 December 1992 (age 33) Clermont-Ferrand, France

Cycling career
- Sport: Cycling
- Role: Rider

Lucie Pader (born 21 December 1992) is a French professional racing cyclist. She rides for team Poitou–Charentes.Futuroscope.86.

== See also ==
- List of 2015 UCI Women's Teams and riders
