= Bretagne Ladies Tour =

French women's staged bicycle race

Tour de Bretagne Féminin
Race details
- Date: July
- Region: France
- English name: Women's Tour of Brittany
- Discipline: Road
- Competition: UCI 2.9.2 (2004); UCI 2.2 (2007–2019); UCI 2.1 (2020–)
- Type: Stage race

History
- First edition: 2000
- Editions: 20 (as of 2026)
- First winner: Marina Jaunâtre (FRA)
- Most wins: Marina Jaunâtre (FRA) (3 wins)
- Most recent: Jasmin Liechti (SUI)

Tour de Bretagne Féminin is a women's staged cycle race that takes place in Brittany in north-west France. The race was previously known as the Tour de Bretagne International Féminin in 2004 and Tour de Bretagne Féminin from 2007 through to 2019. In 2025, the race was cancelled over budgetary concerns.

== Overall winners ==
Year	Winner	Second	Third
2000	(Norway) Monica Valen	(Norway) Ingunn Bollerud	(Norway) Jorunn Kvalø
2001	(Germany) Judith Arndt	(Netherlands) Arenda Grimberg	(Norway) Solrunn Flatås
2002	Race not held		
2003	(France) Edwige Pitel	(France) Magali Lefloc'h	(New Zealand) Kirsty Nicole Robb
2004	(France) Magalie Finot-Laivier	(Italy) Daniela Fusar Poli	(France) Sandrine Marcuz-Moreau
2005	(France) Marina Jaunâtre	(France) Magali Le Floc'h	(France) Edwige Pitel
2006	(France) Marina Jaunâtre	(Netherlands) Andrea Bosman	(France) Alexandra Rannou
2007	(France) Marina Jaunâtre	(France) Karine Gautard	(Australia) Toni Bradshaw
2008	(United Kingdom) Emma Pooley	(Australia) Joanne Kiesanowski	(United States) Lauren Franges
2009	(Belgium) Liesbet De Vocht	(Netherlands) Marianne Vos	(Russia) Alexandra Burchenkova
2010	Race not held		
2011	(Russia) Alexandra Burchenkova	(Canada) Karol-Ann Canuel	(Canada) Rhae-Christie Shaw
2012	(Netherlands) Anna van der Breggen	(Belgium) Sofie De Vuyst	(France) Aude Biannic
2013	(France) Audrey Cordon	(Netherlands) Thalita de Jong	(Russia) Svetlana Stolbova-Bubnenkova
2014	(Italy) Elisa Longo Borghini	(France) Audrey Cordon	(Switzerland) Doris Schweizer
2015	(Italy) Ilaria Sanguineti	(Luxembourg) Christine Majerus	(Russia) Tatiana Antoshina
2016	(Cuba) Arlenis Sierra	(Belgium) Ann-Sophie Duyck	(United Kingdom) Claire Rose
2017	Race not held		
2018	Race not held		
2019	(France) Audrey Cordon-Ragot	(Netherlands) Kirsten Wild	(France) Juliette Labous
2020	Race not held – COVID-19		
2021	Race not held – COVID-19		
2022	(Italy) Vittoria Guazzini	(France) Cédrine Kerbaol	(New Zealand) Ally Wollaston
2023	(Australia) Grace Brown	(France) Coralie Demay	(Italy) Alessia Vigilia
2024	(Australia) Grace Brown	(Italy) Alessia Vigilia	(Netherlands) Amber Kraak
2025	Race not held		
2026	(Switzerland) Jasmin Liechti	(Belgium) Sandrine Tas	(Italy) Letizia Borghesi

== Jerseys ==
- General classification leader – overall rider of the race with the lowest cumulative time
- Youth classification leader – overall youth rider of the race with the lowest cumulative time
- Points classification leader – overall rider with the highest accumulated points
- Mountains classification leader – overall rider with the highest accumulated mountain points
