= La Classique Morbihan =

French cycling race

Race details
- Date: May
- Region: France
- Discipline: Road
- Competition: Coupe de France elite Women FDJ (from 2022)
- Type: One-day race
- Web site: www.gpmo.bzh/la-classique-morbihan-1

History
- First edition: 2015
- Editions: 10 (as of 2025)
- First winner: Chloe Hosking (AUS)
- Most wins: Ashleigh Moolman (RSA); Christine Majerus (LUX); (2 wins)
- Most recent: Eline Jansen (NED)

La Classique Morbihan is a women's one-day cycle race which takes place in France and is currently rated by the UCI as category 1.1, having been rated 1.2 in 2015. It is held as the first race of the Grand Prix Morbihan weekend in Grand-Champ, with the Grand Prix du Morbihan for both men and women held the following day.

== Previous winners ==
Year	Country	Rider	Team
2015	Australia	Chloe Hosking	Wiggle–Honda
2016	Luxembourg	Christine Majerus	Boels–Dolmans
2017	South Africa	Ashleigh Moolman	Cervélo–Bigla Pro Cycling
2018	South Africa	Ashleigh Moolman	Cervélo–Bigla Pro Cycling
2019	Luxembourg	Christine Majerus	Luxembourg (national team)
2020	No race due to the COVID-19 pandemic in France		
2021	Italy	Sofia Bertizzolo	Liv Racing
2022	Cyprus	Antri Christoforou	Team Farto–BTC
2023	Italy	Gaia Masetti	AG Insurance–Soudal–Quick-Step
2024	Italy	Eleonora Gasparrini	UAE Team ADQ
2025	Netherlands	Eline Jansen	VolkerWessels Women Cyclingteam
