= FDJ United–Suez =

French cycling team

Team information
- UCI code: FUT (2006–2016); FDJ (2017–2022); FSF (2022); FST (2023–2024); FSF (2025–present)
- Registered: France
- Founded: 2006
- Discipline: Road
- Status: UCI Women's Team (2006–2019); UCI Women's WorldTeam (2020–present)
- Bicycles: BH Bikes (2006–2016); Lapierre (2017–2024); Specialized (2025–present)
- Website: Team home page

Key personnel
- General manager: Stephen Delcourt
- Team manager: Nicolas Maire – Cédric Barre

Team name history
- 2006–2013 2014–2016 2017–2022 2022 2023–2025 2026–: Vienne Futuroscope; Poitou–Charentes.Futuroscope.86; FDJ Nouvelle-Aquitaine Futuroscope; FDJ Suez Futuroscope; FDJ–Suez; FDJ United–Suez
FDJ United–Suez jersey
Jersey

FDJ United–Suez is a professional women's road bicycle racing team which is based in France. The team competes in various UCI Women's road races, including the UCI Women's World Tour.

The team uses the same equipment as the men's team, along with coaches and shared training camps. The team is sponsored by French lottery Française des Jeux (FDJ) and French waste & utility company Suez.

== Team ==
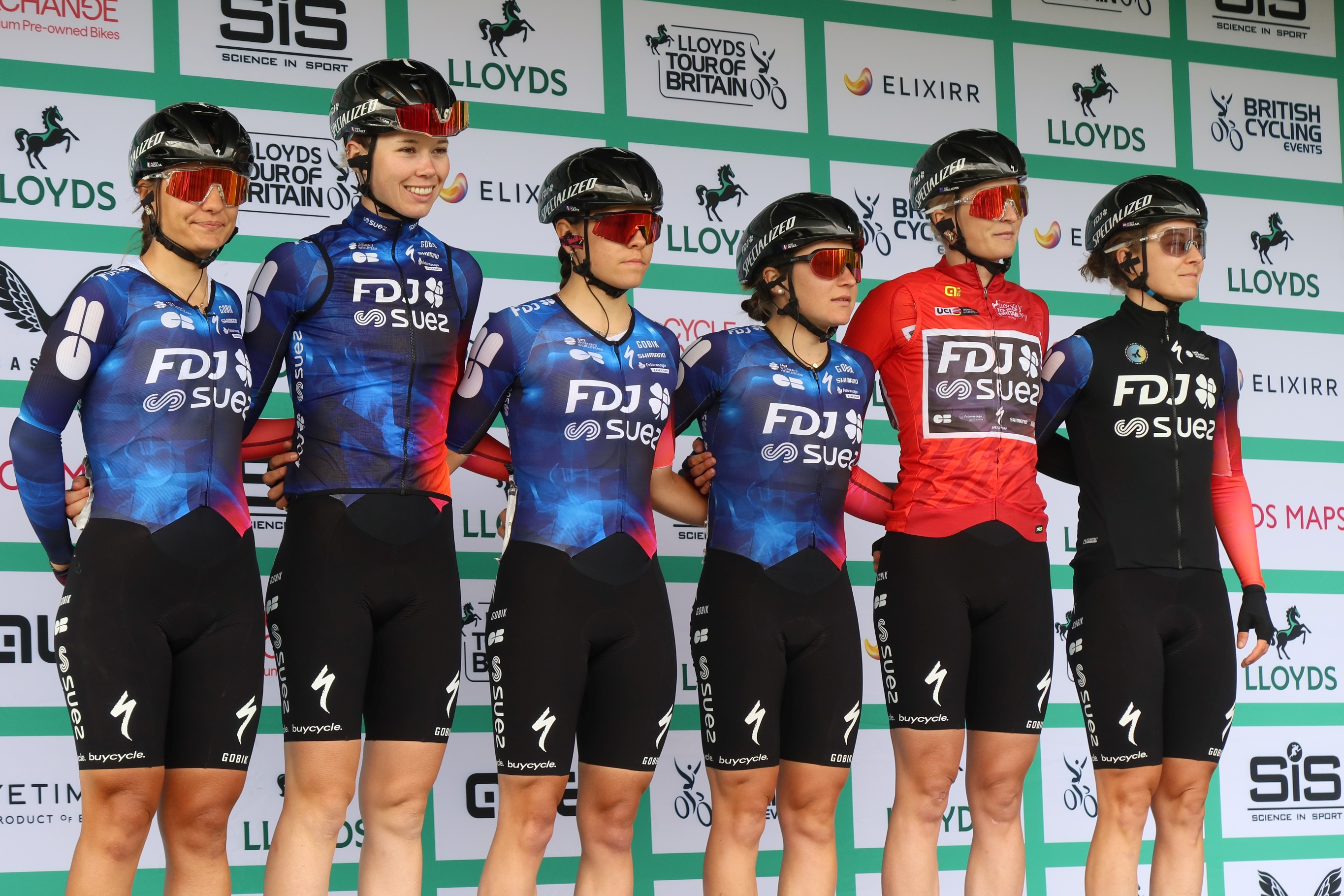
Team at the 2025 Tour of Britain Women

In July 2016, Française des Jeux (FDJ) announced they would initially co-sponsor the team until the end of the 2018 season. For the 2015 season the team announced the signings of Eugénie Duval, Aude Biannic, Greta Richioud and Séverine Eraud. Roxane Fournier, Pascale Jeuland, Lucie Pader, Charlotte Bravard and Amelie Rivat signed contract extensions with the team.

In 2022, Marta Cavalli won the team's first UCI Women's World Tour event at Amstel Gold Race, before winning La Flèche Wallonne Femmes. In 2024, Australian rider Grace Brown won Liège–Bastogne–Liège Femmes, before retiring from the sport at the end of the season.

In October 2024, Dutch rider Demi Vollering announced that she would be joining the team in 2025. Vollering subsequently won Strade Bianche Donne and La Vuelta Femenina.

== Team roster ==
As of 17 January 2025.

Rider	Date of birth
Loes Adegeest (NED)	7 August 1996 (age 30)
Nina Buijsman (NED)	16 November 1997 (age 28)
Elise Chabbey (SUI)	24 April 1993 (age 33)
Léa Curinier (FRA)	21 April 2001 (age 25)
Coralie Demay (FRA)	10 October 1992 (age 34)
Eugénie Duval (FRA)	3 May 1993 (age 33)
Célia Gery (FRA)	4 January 2006 (age 20)
Vittoria Guazzini (ITA)	26 December 2000 (age 25)
Franziska Koch (GER)	13 July 2000 (age 26)
Amber Kraak (NED)	29 July 1994 (age 32)

Rider	Date of birth
Juliette Labous (FRA)	4 November 1998 (age 27)
Marie Le Net (FRA)	25 January 2000 (age 26)
Lauren Molengraaf (NED)	5 October 2005 (age 21)
Évita Muzic (FRA)	26 May 1999 (age 27)
Eglantine Rayer (FRA)	12 June 2004 (age 22)
Alessia Vigilia (ITA)	9 January 1999 (age 27)
Demi Vollering (NED)	15 October 1996 (age 30)
Jade Wiel (FRA)	2 April 2000 (age 26)
Ally Wollaston (NZL)	4 January 2001 (age 25)
Fem van Empel (NED)	3 September 2002 (age 24)

== Major results ==
2006
Stage 2 Grand Prix de France International, Marina Jaunâtre
Grand Prix de France International Féminin, Marina Jaunâtre

Stage 1, Marina Jaunâtre

Tour de Bretagne, Marina Jaunâtre
2007
GP Cholet — Pays de Loire, Marina Jaunâtre
Route Féminine Du Vignoble Nantais, Karine Gautard Roussel
Calan, Nathalie Jeuland
Saint-Amand-Mont-Rond, Karine Gautard Roussel
Tour de Bretagne, Marina Jaunâtre

Stages 3 & 5a, Karine Gautard Roussel

Classic Féminine Vienne Poitou-Charentes, Emilie Blanquefort
2008
Route Féminine Du Vignoble Nantais, Karine Gautard Roussel
Saint Quentin les Anges, Nathalie Jeuland
Vitry aux Loges, Emilie Jeannot
Nazelles Negron, Emilie Jeannot
Duo Normand, Karine Gautard Roussel & Emmanuelle Merlot
2009
GP Cholet — Pays de Loire, Florence Girardet
Besançon Cyclo-cross, Caroline Mani
2010
Saverne Cyclo-cross, Christel Ferrier-Bruneau
Miramas Cyclo-cross, Christel Ferrier-Bruneau
Saint-Jean-de-Monts, Cyclo-cross, Christel Ferrier-Bruneau
2012
GP Cholet — Pays de Loire, Audrey Cordon
2013
Tour de Bretagne, Audrey Cordon
Stage 5 Tour de l'Ardèche, Karol-Ann Canuel
2014
Begijnendijk Road Race, Fiona Dutriaux
Youth classification Tour de Bretagne Féminin, Lucie Pader
Stages 1 & 5 Trophée d'Or Féminin, Pascale Jeuland
2015
Grand Prix de Dottignies, Roxane Fournier
Stage 3 Tour of Chongming Island, Roxane Fournier
Mountains classification Tour de Bretagne Féminin, Amelie Rivat
Stage 1 Tour Cycliste Féminin International de l'Ardèche, Roxane Fournier
2016
Stage 3 Tour of Zhoushan Island, Roxane Fournier
Stages 2 & 7 La Route de France, Roxane Fournier
2017
Youth classification Tour de Feminin-O cenu Českého Švýcarska, Séverine Eraud
Combativity classification Holland Ladies Tour, Stages 2 & 3, Eri Yonamine
Championnat Régional Centre (Pierres), Charlotte Bravard
Overall Tour de Charente-Maritime, Shara Gillow

Stages 1 & 2 (ITT), Shara Gillow

2018
Stage 5 Thüringen Rundfahrt der Frauen, Rozanne Slik
Grand Prix International d'Isbergues – Pas de Calais Feminin, Lauren Kitchen
2019
Young rider classification Emakumeen Euskal Bira, Évita Muzic
La Périgord Ladies, Jade Wiel
2021
Stage 3 Vuelta a Burgos Feminas, Cecilie Uttrup Ludwig
2022
Amstel Gold Race, Marta Cavalli
Grand Prix Féminin de Chambéry, Brodie Chapman
La Flèche Wallonne Féminine, Marta Cavalli
Overall Bretagne Ladies Tour, Vittoria Guazzini

Mountains classification, Victorie Guilman
Young rider classification, Vittoria Guazzini
Team classification

Young rider classification Vuelta a Burgos Feminas, Évita Muzic
2023
Tour Down Under, Grace Brown
Cadel Evans Great Ocean Road Race, Loes Adegeest
2024
Liège–Bastogne–Liège Femmes, Grace Brown
2025
Strade Bianche Donne, Demi Vollering
Overall La Vuelta Femenina, Demi Vollering

Mountains classification, Demi Vollering
Team classification

Itzulia Women, Demi Vollering
Overall Tour of Britain Women, Ally Wollaston

Team classification

2026
1st Omloop Het Nieuwsblad, Demi Vollering
1st Overall Setmana Ciclista Valenciana, Demi Vollering

1st Stage 1, Demi Vollering
1st Stage 4, Demi Vollering

== National, continental and world champions ==
2006
France U23 Time Trial, Karine Gautard Roussel
2007
France Track (Points race), Pascale Jeuland
European Junior Track (Individual pursuit), Fiona Dutriaux
2008
France Track (Points race), Pascale Jeuland
2009
France Track (Individual pursuit), Fiona Dutriaux
France Track (Points race), Fiona Dutriaux
2010
France Cyclo-cross, Caroline Mani
World Track (Scratch race), Pascale Jeuland
Canada Time Trial, Julie Beveridge
France Track (Points race), Fiona Dutriaux
2012
France Track (Omnium), Fiona Dutriaux
France Road Race, Marion Rousse
Austria Road Race, Andrea Graus
2014
Australia Criterium, Sarah Roy
France Track (Individual pursuit), Pascale Jeuland
France Track (Team pursuit), Pascale Jeuland
France Track (Team pursuit), Roxane Fournier
France Track (Team pursuit), Fiona Dutriaux
2015
France Track (Team pursuit), Aude Biannic
France Track (Team pursuit), Roxane Fournier
France Track (Team pursuit), Pascale Jeuland
2016
France Track (Omnium), Pascale Jeuland
2017
Japan Time Trial, Eri Yonamine
Japan Road Race, Eri Yonamine
France Road Race, Charlotte Bravard
France Track (Scratch race), Coralie Demay
France Track (Omnium), Coralie Demay
France Track (Individual pursuit), Coralie Demay
France Track (Team pursuit), Coralie Demay
France Track (Points race), Coralie Demay
2018
France Track (Scratch race), Coralie Demay
France Track (Omnium), Coralie Demay
France Track (Individual pursuit), Coralie Demay
2019
France Road Race, Jade Wiel
France Track (Omnium), Clara Copponi
France Track (Team pursuit), Clara Copponi
Germany Track (Team pursuit), Charlotte Becker
France Track (Individual pursuit), Coralie Demay
France Track (Madison), Clara Copponi
France Track (Madison), Coralie Demay
2021
France Road Race, Évita Muzic
2022
Australia Time Trial, Grace Brown

== Sponsorship ==
In March 2026, reports indicated that the Austrian company Red Bull was set to become the title sponsor of the French women's cycling team FDJ–SUEZ, with the partnership expected to support a new contract for rider Demi Vollering.
