= Grand Prix du Morbihan Féminin =

French one-day road cycling race

Race details
- Date: May
- Region: France
- Discipline: Road
- Competition: National event (2011 to 2013); UCI 1.2 (2014); UCI 1.1 (since 2015)
- Web site: www.grand-prix-plumelec.com/dames/presentation

History
- First edition: 2011
- Editions: 14 (as of 2025)
- First winner: Julie Beveridge (CAN)
- Most wins: Audrey Cordon-Ragot (FRA); Ashleigh Moolman (RSA); (2 wins)
- Most recent: Eline Jansen (NED)

The Grand Prix du Morbihan Féminin is an elite women's professional one-day road bicycle race held in France and is currently rated by the UCI as a 1.1 race.

== Past winners ==
| Year | Country | Rider | Team |
|---|---|---|---|
| 2011 | Canada | Julie Beveridge | Vienne Futuroscope |
| 2012 | France | Audrey Cordon | Vienne Futuroscope |
| 2013 | France | Emmanuelle Merlot | Vienne Futuroscope |
| 2014 | France | Audrey Cordon | Team Hitec Products |
| 2015 | Spain | Sheyla Gutiérrez | Lointek |
| 2016 | Australia | Rachel Neylan | Orica–AIS |
| 2017 | South Africa | Ashleigh Moolman | Cervélo–Bigla Pro Cycling |
| 2018 | South Africa | Ashleigh Moolman | Cervélo–Bigla Pro Cycling |
| 2019 | Denmark | Cecilie Uttrup Ludwig | Bigla Pro Cycling |
| 2020 | No race due to the COVID-19 pandemic in France | | |
| 2021 | Italy | Chiara Consonni | Valcar–Travel & Service |
| 2022 | New Zealand | Ally Wollaston | AG Insurance–NXTG |
| 2023 | Australia | Grace Brown | FDJ–Suez |
| 2024 | Italy | Silvia Persico | UAE Team ADQ |
| 2025 | Italy | Eleonora Gasparrini | UAE Team ADQ |
| 2026 | Netherlands | Eline Jansen | VolkerWessels Women Cyclingteam |
