= 2024 Tour of Chongming Island =

2024 UCI Women's World Tour, race 26 of 27

Race details
- Dates: 15–17 October
- Stages: 3
- Distance: 349.3 km (217.0 mi)
- Winning time: 8h 32' 24"

Results
Jersey awarded to the overall winner	Winner	Marta Lach (POL)	(Ceratizit–WNT Pro Cycling)
	Second	Mylène de Zoete (NED)	(Ceratizit–WNT Pro Cycling)
	Third	Scarlett Souren (NED)	(VolkerWessels Women Cyclingteam)
Jersey awarded to the points classification winner	Points	Marta Lach (POL)	(Ceratizit–WNT Pro Cycling)
Jersey awarded to the mountains classification winner	Mountains	Anne Knijnenburg (NED)	(VolkerWessels Women Cyclingteam)
Jersey awarded to the youth classification winner	Youth	Scarlett Souren (NED)	(VolkerWessels Women Cyclingteam)
	Team	(Germany) Ceratizit–WNT Pro Cycling	

The 2024 Tour of Chongming Island was the 15th edition of the Tour of Chongming Island road cycling stage race, which is the part of the 2024 UCI Women's World Tour. It began on the 15th of October in Chongming and finished on the 22nd of September also in Chongming.

== Teams ==
Four UCI Women's WorldTeams, thirteen UCI Women's Continental Teams and one national team made up the eighteen teams that participated in the race.

UCI Women's WorldTeams

- UAE Team ADQ
- Ceratizit–WNT Pro Cycling
- Human Powered Health
- Roland

UCI Women's Continental Teams

- VolkerWessels Women Cyclingteam
- Laboral Kutxa–Fundación Euskadi
- Lotto–Dstny Ladies
- BTC City Ljubljana Zhiraf Ambedo
- Winspace
- Team Coop–Repsol
- Thailand Women's Cycling Team
- ARA Skip Capital
- Team Dukla Praha
- HKSI Pro Cycling Team
- China Liv Pro Cycling
- Li Ning Star Ladies
- Bodywrap LTwoo Women's Cycling Team

National teams

- China

== Route ==
Stage characteristics and winners
Stage	Date	Course	Distance	Type	Stage winner
1	15 October	Chongming New City Park to Chongming New City Park	108.9 km (67.7 mi)	Flat stage	Mylène de Zoete (NED)
2	16 October	Changxing Island Country Park to Chongming New City Park	129 km (80 mi)	Flat stage	Marta Lach (POL)
3	17 October	Chongming New City Park to Chongming New City Park	111.4 km (69.2 mi)	Flat stage	Marta Lach (POL)
Total			349.3 km (217.0 mi)		

== Stages ==
=== Stage 1 ===
15 October — Chongming New City Park to Chongming New City Park, 108.9 km (67.7 mi)

Stage 1 Result
Rank	Rider	Team	Time
1	Mylène de Zoete (NED)	Ceratizit–WNT Pro Cycling	2h 29' 07"
2	Tereza Neumanová (CZE)	UAE Team ADQ	+ 0"
3	Silvia Zanardi (ITA)	Human Powered Health	+ 0"
4	Sofie van Rooijen (NED)	VolkerWessels Women Cyclingteam	+ 0"
5	Scarlett Souren (NED)	VolkerWessels Women Cyclingteam	+ 0"
6	Wenjia Qi (CHN)	Bodywrap LTwoo Women's Cycling Team	+ 0"
7	Laura Tomasi (ITA)	Laboral Kutxa–Fundación Euskadi	+ 0"
8	Karolina Kumięga (POL)	UAE Team Emirates	+ 0"
9	Camilla Rånes Bye (NOR)	Team Coop–Repsol	+ 0"
10	Lucinda Stewart (AUS)	ARA Skip Capital	+ 0"

General classification after Stage 1
Rank	Rider	Team	Time
1	Mylène de Zoete (NED)	Ceratizit–WNT Pro Cycling	2h 28' 54"
2	Tereza Neumanová (CZE)	UAE Team ADQ	+ 7"
3	Silvia Zanardi (ITA)	Human Powered Health	+ 9"
4	Marta Lach (POL)	Ceratizit–WNT Pro Cycling	+ 9"
5	Sofie van Rooijen (NED)	VolkerWessels Women Cyclingteam	+ 11"
6	Scarlett Souren (NED)	VolkerWessels Women Cyclingteam	+ 11"
7	Wenjia Qi (CHN)	Bodywrap LTwoo Women's Cycling Team	+ 12"
8	Kathrin Schweinberger (AUT)	Ceratizit–WNT Pro Cycling	+ 13"
9	Laura Tomasi (ITA)	Laboral Kutxa–Fundación Euskadi	+ 13"
10	Karolina Kumięga (POL)	UAE Team Emirates	+ 13"

=== Stage 2 ===
16 October — Changxing Island Country Park to Chongming New City Park, 129 km (80 mi)

Stage 2 Result
Rank	Rider	Team	Time
1	Marta Lach (POL)	Ceratizit–WNT Pro Cycling	3h 23' 05"
2	Mylène de Zoete (NED)	Ceratizit–WNT Pro Cycling	+ 0"
3	Kathrin Schweinberger (AUT)	Ceratizit–WNT Pro Cycling	+ 0"
4	Alba Teruel Ribes (ESP)	Laboral Kutxa–Fundación Euskadi	+ 0"
5	Maggie Coles-Lyster (CAN)	Roland	+ 0"
6	Silvia Zanardi (ITA)	Human Powered Health	+ 0"
7	Karolina Kumięga (POL)	UAE Team Emirates	+ 0"
8	Jutatip Maneephan (THA)	Thailand Women's Cycling Team	+ 0"
9	Tereza Neumanová (CZE)	UAE Team ADQ	+ 0"
10	Sylvie Swinkels (NED)	Roland	+ 0"

General classification after Stage 2
Rank	Rider	Team	Time
1	Mylène de Zoete (NED)	Ceratizit–WNT Pro Cycling	5h 51' 13"
2	Marta Lach (POL)	Ceratizit–WNT Pro Cycling	+ 3"
3	Tereza Neumanová (CZE)	UAE Team ADQ	+ 13"
4	Kathrin Schweinberger (AUT)	Ceratizit–WNT Pro Cycling	+ 13"
5	Sofie van Rooijen (NED)	VolkerWessels Women Cyclingteam	+ 14"
6	Silvia Zanardi (ITA)	Human Powered Health	+ 15"
7	Scarlett Souren (NED)	VolkerWessels Women Cyclingteam	+ 15"
8	Tamara Dronova	Roland	+ 16"
9	Hanna Tserakh	BTC City Ljubljana Zhiraf Ambedo	+ 18"
10	Karolina Kumięga (POL)	UAE Team Emirates	+ 19"

=== Stage 3 ===
17 October — Chongming New City Park to Chongming New City Park, 111.4 km (69.2 mi)

Stage 3 Result
Rank	Rider	Team	Time
1	Marta Lach (POL)	Ceratizit–WNT Pro Cycling	2h 40' 39"
2	Scarlett Souren (NED)	VolkerWessels Women Cyclingteam	+ 0"
3	Sofie van Rooijen (NED)	VolkerWessels Women Cyclingteam	+ 0"
4	Silvia Zanardi (ITA)	Human Powered Health	+ 0"
5	Tereza Neumanová (CZE)	UAE Team ADQ	+ 0"
6	Kathrin Schweinberger (AUT)	Ceratizit–WNT Pro Cycling	+ 0"
7	Kristýna Burlová (CZE)	Team Dukla Praha	+ 0"
8	Daria Pikulik (POL)	Human Powered Health	+ 0"
9	Mieke Docx (BEL)	Lotto–Dstny Ladies	+ 0"
10	Anna Van Wersch (NED)	Lotto–Dstny Ladies	+ 0"

General classification after Stage 3
Rank	Rider	Team	Time
1	Marta Lach (POL)	Ceratizit–WNT Pro Cycling	8h 32' 24"
2	Mylène de Zoete (NED)	Ceratizit–WNT Pro Cycling	+ 8"
3	Scarlett Souren (NED)	VolkerWessels Women Cyclingteam	+ 14"
4	Sofie van Rooijen (NED)	VolkerWessels Women Cyclingteam	+ 15"
5	Tereza Neumanová (CZE)	UAE Team ADQ	+ 19"
6	Kathrin Schweinberger (AUT)	Ceratizit–WNT Pro Cycling	+ 19"
7	Silvia Zanardi (ITA)	Human Powered Health	+ 23"
8	Tamara Dronova	Roland	+ 24"
9	Anne Knijnenburg (NED)	VolkerWessels Women Cyclingteam	+ 24"
10	Nela Slaníková (CZE)	Team Dukla Praha	+ 25"

== Classification leadership table ==
Classification leadership by stage
Stage	Winner	General classification	Points classification	Mountains classification	Young rider classification	Team classification
1	Mylène de Zoete	Mylène de Zoete	Mylène de Zoete	Karolina Kumięga	Sofie van Rooijen	VolkerWessels Women Cyclingteam
2	Marta Lach	Mylène de Zoete	Mylène de Zoete	Karolina Kumięga	Sofie van Rooijen	Ceratizit–WNT Pro Cycling
3	Marta Lach	Marta Lach	Marta Lach	Anne Knijnenburg	Scarlett Souren	Ceratizit–WNT Pro Cycling
Final		Marta Lach	Marta Lach	Anne Knijnenburg	Scarlett Souren	Ceratizit–WNT Pro Cycling

== Classification standings ==
Legend
Denotes the winner of the general classification	Denotes the winner of the young rider classification
Denotes the winner of the points classification	Denotes the winner of the mountains classification

=== General classification ===
Final general classification (1–10)
Rank	Rider	Team	Time
1	Marta Lach (POL)	Ceratizit–WNT Pro Cycling	8h 32' 24"
2	Mylène de Zoete (NED)	Ceratizit–WNT Pro Cycling	+ 8"
3	Scarlett Souren (NED)	VolkerWessels Women Cyclingteam	+ 16"
4	Sofie van Rooijen (NED)	VolkerWessels Women Cyclingteam	+ 19"
5	Tereza Neumanová (CZE)	UAE Team ADQ	+ 21"
6	Kathrin Schweinberger (AUT)	Ceratizit–WNT Pro Cycling	+ 26"
7	Silvia Zanardi (ITA)	Human Powered Health	+ 46"
8	Tamara Dronova	Roland	+ 54"
9	Anne Knijnenburg (NED)	VolkerWessels Women Cyclingteam	+ 1' 04"
10	Nela Slaníková (CZE)	Team Dukla Praha	+ 1' 15"

=== Points classification ===
Final general classification (1–10)
Rank	Rider	Team	Points
1	Marta Lach (POL)	Ceratizit–WNT Pro Cycling	38
2	Mylène de Zoete (NED)	Ceratizit–WNT Pro Cycling	31
3	Sofie van Rooijen (NED)	VolkerWessels Women Cyclingteam	31
4	Scarlett Souren (NED)	VolkerWessels Women Cyclingteam	29
5	Tereza Neumanová (CZE)	UAE Team ADQ	23
6	Silvia Zanardi (ITA)	Human Powered Health	23
7	Kathrin Schweinberger (AUT)	Ceratizit–WNT Pro Cycling	20
8	Alba Teruel Ribes (ESP)	Laboral Kutxa–Fundación Euskadi	8
9	Karolina Kumięga (POL)	UAE Team ADQ	7
10	Maggie Coles-Lyster (CAN)	Roland	6

=== Mountains classification ===
Final mountains classification
Rank	Rider	Team	Points
1	Anne Knijnenburg (NED)	VolkerWessels Women Cyclingteam	2
2	Karolina Kumięga (POL)	UAE Team ADQ	1

=== Young rider classification ===
Final young rider classification (1–10)
Rank	Rider	Team	Time
1	Scarlett Souren (NED)	VolkerWessels Women Cyclingteam	8h 32' 38"
2	Sofie van Rooijen (NED)	VolkerWessels Women Cyclingteam	+ 1"
3	Anne Knijnenburg (NED)	VolkerWessels Women Cyclingteam	+ 10"
4	Nela Slaníková (CZE)	Team Dukla Praha	+ 11"
5	Camilla Rånes Bye (NOR)	Team Coop–Repsol	+ 13"
6	Kristýna Burlová (CZE)	Team Dukla Praha	+ 13"
7	Lucinda Stewart (AUS)	ARA Skip Capital	+ 13"
8	Yuandan Wen (CHN)	China	+ 13"
9	Lara Crestanello (ITA)	BTC City Ljubljana Zhiraf Ambedo	+ 13"
10	Ning Chen (CHN)	China Liv Pro Cycling	+ 13"

=== Team classification ===
Final team classification (1–10)
Rank	Team	Time
1	(Germany) Ceratizit–WNT Pro Cycling	25h 38' 33"
2	(Netherlands) VolkerWessels Women Cyclingteam	+ 0"
3	(Switzerland) Roland	+ 0"
4	(United Arab Emirates) UAE Team ADQ	+ 0"
5	(United States) Human Powered Health	+ 0"
6	(Italy) BTC City Ljubljana Zhiraf Ambedo	+ 0"
7	(Spain) Laboral Kutxa–Fundación Euskadi	+ 0"
8	(Czech Republic) Team Dukla Praha	+ 0"
9	(Norway) Team Coop–Repsol	+ 0"
10	(Netherlands) Lotto–Dstny Ladies	+ 0"
