= 2022 Holland Ladies Tour =

Women's road cycling stage race in the Netherlands

2022 UCI Women's World Tour, race 21 of 23
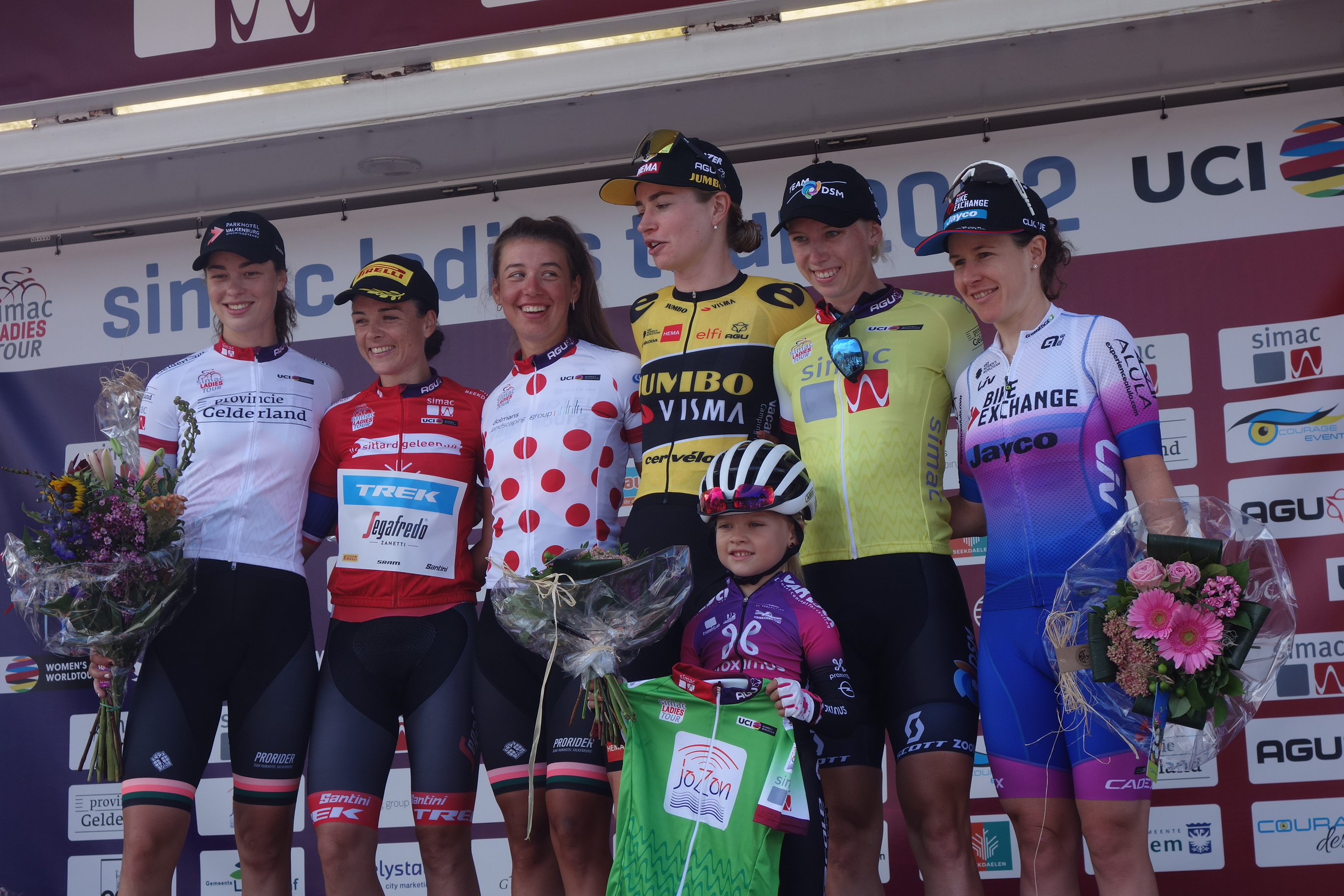
- Podium after stage 5 left to right: Mischa Bredewold, Audrey Cordon-Ragot, Kirstie van Haaften, Riejanne Markus, Lorena Wiebes, Amanda Spratt

Race details
- Dates: 30 August–4 September 2022
- Stages: 6
- Distance: 701.4 km (435.8 mi)
- Winning time: 17h 25' 28"

Results
Jersey awarded to the overall winner	Winner	Lorena Wiebes (NED)	(Team DSM)
	Second	Audrey Cordon-Ragot (FRA)	(Trek–Segafredo)
	Third	Karlijn Swinkels (NED)	(Team Jumbo–Visma)
Jersey awarded to the points classification winner	Points	Lorena Wiebes (NED)	(Team DSM)
Jersey awarded to the mountains classification winner	Mountains	Kirstie van Haaften (NED)	(Parkhotel Valkenburg)
Jersey awarded to the young rider classification winner	Young rider	Mischa Bredewold (NED)	(Parkhotel Valkenburg)
	Team	(Netherlands) Team Jumbo–Visma	

The 2022 Holland Ladies Tour, also known as the 2022 Simac Ladies Tour, was a road cycling stage race that took place in the Netherlands between 30 August and 4 September 2022. It was the 24th edition of the Holland Ladies Tour, and part of the 2022 UCI Women's World Tour.

== Teams ==
11 of 14 UCI Women's WorldTeams and five UCI Women's Continental Teams made up the sixteen teams that participated in the race.

UCI Women's WorldTeams

- Canyon//SRAM
- FDJ Suez Futuroscope
- Liv Racing Xstra
- Roland Cogeas Edelweiss Squad
- SD Worx
- Team BikeExchange–Jayco
- Team DSM
- Team Jumbo–Visma
- Trek–Segafredo
- UAE Team ADQ
- Uno-X Pro Cycling Team

UCI Women's Continental Teams

- AG Insurance–NXTG
- GT Krush Tunap
- Parkhotel Valkenburg
- Plantur–Pura
- Valcar–Travel & Service

== Route ==
Stage characteristics and winners
Stage	Date	Course	Distance	Type	Stage winner
1	30 August	Lelystad to Lelystad	141.2 km (87.7 mi)	Flat stage	Lorena Wiebes (NED)
2	31 August	Ede to Ede	117.8 km (73.2 mi)	Flat stage	Lorena Wiebes (NED)
3	1 September	Gennep to Gennep	139.1 km (86.4 mi)	Flat stage	Charlotte Kool (NED)
4	2 September	Landgraaf to Landgraaf	135.2 km (84.0 mi)	Hilly stage	Riejanne Markus (NED)
5	3 September	Sittard-Geleen to Beekdaelen	17.8 km (11.1 mi)	Individual time trial	Audrey Cordon-Ragot (FRA)
6	4 September	Arnhem to Arnhem	150.3 km (93.4 mi)	Hilly stage	Mischa Bredewold (NED)
Total			701.4 km (435.8 mi)		

== Stages ==
=== Stage 1 ===
30 August 2022 – Lelystad to Lelystad, 141.2 km (87.7 mi)

Stage 1 Result
Rank	Rider	Team	Time
1	Lorena Wiebes (NED)	Team DSM	3h 17' 24"
2	Karlijn Swinkels (NED)	Team Jumbo–Visma	+ 0"
3	Audrey Cordon-Ragot (FRA)	Trek–Segafredo	+ 0"
4	Alison Jackson (CAN)	Liv Racing Xstra	+ 0"
5	Eugénie Duval (FRA)	FDJ Suez Futuroscope	+ 0"
6	Ruby Roseman-Gannon (AUS)	Team BikeExchange–Jayco	+ 0"
7	Soraya Paladin (ITA)	Canyon//SRAM	+ 0"
8	Eleonora Gasparrini (ITA)	Valcar–Travel & Service	+ 0"
9	Anna Henderson (GBR)	Team Jumbo–Visma	+ 0"
10	Jeanne Korevaar (NED)	Liv Racing Xstra	+ 0"

General classification after Stage 1
Rank	Rider	Team	Time
1	Lorena Wiebes (NED)	Team DSM	3h 17' 13"
2	Karlijn Swinkels (NED)	Team Jumbo–Visma	+ 2"
3	Audrey Cordon-Ragot (FRA)	Trek–Segafredo	+ 5"
4	Alison Jackson (CAN)	Liv Racing Xstra	+ 7"
5	Eugénie Duval (FRA)	FDJ Suez Futuroscope	+ 11"
6	Ruby Roseman-Gannon (AUS)	Team BikeExchange–Jayco	+ 11"
7	Soraya Paladin (ITA)	Canyon//SRAM	+ 11"
8	Eleonora Gasparrini (ITA)	Valcar–Travel & Service	+ 11"
9	Anna Henderson (GBR)	Team Jumbo–Visma	+ 11"
10	Jeanne Korevaar (NED)	Liv Racing Xstra	+ 11"

=== Stage 2 ===
31 August 2022 – Ede to Ede, 117.8 km (73.2 mi)

Stage 2 Result
Rank	Rider	Team	Time
1	Lorena Wiebes (NED)	Team DSM	2h 54' 55"
2	Laura Tomasi (ITA)	UAE Team ADQ	+ 0"
3	Lonneke Uneken (NED)	SD Worx	+ 0"
4	Mylène De Zoete (NED)	AG Insurance–NXTG	+ 0"
5	Rachele Barbieri (ITA)	Liv Racing Xstra	+ 0"
6	Karlijn Swinkels (NED)	Team Jumbo–Visma	+ 0"
7	Tamara Dronova	Roland Cogeas Edelweiss Squad	+ 0"
8	Amalie Dideriksen (DEN)	Trek–Segafredo	+ 0"
9	Daniek Hengeveld (NED)	GT Krush Tunap	+ 0"
10	Maud Rijnbeek (NED)	AG Insurance–NXTG	+ 0"

General classification after Stage 2
Rank	Rider	Team	Time
1	Lorena Wiebes (NED)	Team DSM	6h 11' 58"
2	Karlijn Swinkels (NED)	Team Jumbo–Visma	+ 15"
3	Audrey Cordon-Ragot (FRA)	Trek–Segafredo	+ 15"
4	Lonneke Uneken (NED)	SD Worx	+ 17"
5	Alison Jackson (CAN)	Liv Racing Xstra	+ 17"
6	Anna Henderson (GBR)	Team Jumbo–Visma	+ 18"
7	Soraya Paladin (ITA)	Canyon//SRAM	+ 21"
8	Eugénie Duval (FRA)	FDJ Suez Futuroscope	+ 21"
9	Mischa Bredewold (NED)	Parkhotel Valkenburg	+ 21"
10	Jeanne Korevaar (NED)	Liv Racing Xstra	+ 21"

=== Stage 3 ===
1 September 2022 – Gennep to Gennep, 139.1 km (86.4 mi)

Stage 3 Result
Rank	Rider	Team	Time
1	Charlotte Kool (NED)	Team DSM	3h 16' 44"
2	Lorena Wiebes (NED)	Team DSM	+ 0"
3	Georgia Baker (AUS)	Team BikeExchange–Jayco	+ 0"
4	Clara Copponi (FRA)	FDJ Suez Futuroscope	+ 0"
5	Tamara Dronova	Roland Cogeas Edelweiss Squad	+ 0"
6	Mylène De Zoete (NED)	AG Insurance–NXTG	+ 0"
7	Rachele Barbieri (ITA)	Liv Racing Xstra	+ 0"
8	Alison Jackson (CAN)	Liv Racing Xstra	+ 0"
9	Karlijn Swinkels (NED)	Team Jumbo–Visma	+ 0"
10	Soraya Paladin (ITA)	Canyon//SRAM	+ 0"

General classification after Stage 3
Rank	Rider	Team	Time
1	Lorena Wiebes (NED)	Team DSM	9h 28' 36"
2	Charlotte Kool (NED)	Team DSM	+ 17"
3	Karlijn Swinkels (NED)	Team Jumbo–Visma	+ 18"
4	Audrey Cordon-Ragot (FRA)	Trek–Segafredo	+ 21"
5	Lonneke Uneken (NED)	SD Worx	+ 23"
6	Alison Jackson (CAN)	Liv Racing Xstra	+ 23"
7	Anna Henderson (GBR)	Team Jumbo–Visma	+ 24"
8	Soraya Paladin (ITA)	Canyon//SRAM	+ 27"
9	Eugénie Duval (FRA)	FDJ Suez Futuroscope	+ 27"
10	Mischa Bredewold (NED)	Parkhotel Valkenburg	+ 27"

=== Stage 4 ===
2 September 2022 – Landgraaf to Landgraaf, 135.2 km (84.0 mi)

Stage 4 Result
Rank	Rider	Team	Time
1	Riejanne Markus (NED)	Team Jumbo–Visma	3h 38' 57"
2	Lorena Wiebes (NED)	Team DSM	+ 14"
3	Karlijn Swinkels (NED)	Team Jumbo–Visma	+ 14"
4	Laura Tomasi (ITA)	UAE Team ADQ	+ 14"
5	Ilaria Sanguineti (ITA)	Valcar–Travel & Service	+ 14"
6	Anna Henderson (GBR)	Team Jumbo–Visma	+ 14"
7	Eleonora Gasparrini (ITA)	Valcar–Travel & Service	+ 14"
8	Soraya Paladin (ITA)	Canyon//SRAM	+ 14"
9	Tamara Dronova	Roland Cogeas Edelweiss Squad	+ 14"
10	Alison Jackson (CAN)	Liv Racing Xstra	+ 14"

General classification after Stage 4
Rank	Rider	Team	Time
1	Lorena Wiebes (NED)	Team DSM	13h 07' 41"
2	Karlijn Swinkels (NED)	Team Jumbo–Visma	+ 20"
3	Audrey Cordon-Ragot (FRA)	Trek–Segafredo	+ 27"
4	Alison Jackson (CAN)	Liv Racing Xstra	+ 29"
5	Anna Henderson (GBR)	Team Jumbo–Visma	+ 30"
6	Soraya Paladin (ITA)	Canyon//SRAM	+ 33"
7	Eleonora Gasparrini (ITA)	Valcar–Travel & Service	+ 33"
8	Mischa Bredewold (NED)	Parkhotel Valkenburg	+ 33"
9	Romy Kasper (GER)	Team Jumbo–Visma	+ 33"
10	Ruby Roseman-Gannon (AUS)	Team BikeExchange–Jayco	+ 33"

=== Stage 5 ===
3 September 2022 – Sittard-Geleen to Beekdaelen, 17.8 km (11.1 mi)

Stage 5 Result
Rank	Rider	Team	Time
1	Audrey Cordon-Ragot (FRA)	Trek–Segafredo	25' 15"
2	Riejanne Markus (NED)	Team Jumbo–Visma	+ 3"
3	Amanda Spratt (AUS)	Team BikeExchange–Jayco	+ 10"
4	Julie De Wilde (BEL)	Plantur–Pura	+ 13"
5	Lorena Wiebes (NED)	Team DSM	+ 21"
6	Ruby Roseman-Gannon (AUS)	Team BikeExchange–Jayco	+ 36"
7	Karlijn Swinkels (NED)	Team Jumbo–Visma	+ 37"
8	Alice Barnes (GBR)	Canyon//SRAM	+ 42"
9	Lauretta Hanson (AUS)	Trek–Segafredo	+ 45"
10	Anna Henderson (GBR)	Team Jumbo–Visma	+ 52"

General classification after Stage 5
Rank	Rider	Team	Time
1	Lorena Wiebes (NED)	Team DSM	13h 33' 17"
2	Audrey Cordon-Ragot (FRA)	Trek–Segafredo	+ 6"
3	Karlijn Swinkels (NED)	Team Jumbo–Visma	+ 36"
4	Riejanne Markus (NED)	Team Jumbo–Visma	+ 40"
5	Ruby Roseman-Gannon (AUS)	Team BikeExchange–Jayco	+ 48"
6	Anna Henderson (GBR)	Team Jumbo–Visma	+ 1' 01"
7	Alison Jackson (CAN)	Liv Racing Xstra	+ 1' 03"
8	Mischa Bredewold (NED)	Parkhotel Valkenburg	+ 1' 10"
9	Amanda Spratt (AUS)	Team BikeExchange–Jayco	+ 1' 11"
10	Julie De Wilde (BEL)	Plantur–Pura	+ 1' 14"

=== Stage 6 ===
4 September 2022 – Arnhem to Arnhem, 150.3 km (93.4 mi)

Stage 6 Result
Rank	Rider	Team	Time
1	Mischa Bredewold (NED)	Plantur–Pura	3h 52' 10"
2	Eleonora Gasparrini (ITA)	Valcar–Travel & Service	+ 0"
3	Lorena Wiebes (NED)	Team DSM	+ 5"
4	Chiara Consonni (ITA)	Valcar–Travel & Service	+ 5"
5	Karlijn Swinkels (NED)	Team Jumbo–Visma	+ 5"
6	Anna Henderson (GBR)	Team Jumbo–Visma	+ 5"
7	Chloe Hosking (AUS)	Trek–Segafredo	+ 5"
8	Lonneke Uneken (NED)	SD Worx	+ 5"
9	Eugénie Duval (NED)	FDJ Suez Futuroscope	+ 5"
10	Laura Tomasi (ITA)	UAE Team ADQ	+ 5"

Final general classification
Rank	Rider	Team	Time
1	Lorena Wiebes (NED)	Team DSM	17h 25' 28"
2	Audrey Cordon-Ragot (FRA)	Trek–Segafredo	+ 10"
3	Karlijn Swinkels (NED)	Team Jumbo–Visma	+ 40"
4	Riejanne Markus (NED)	Team Jumbo–Visma	+ 44"
5	Ruby Roseman-Gannon (AUS)	Team BikeExchange–Jayco	+ 52"
6	Mischa Bredewold (NED)	Parkhotel Valkenburg	+ 1' 10"
7	Anna Henderson (GBR)	Team Jumbo–Visma	+ 1' 05"
8	Alison Jackson (CAN)	Liv Racing Xstra	+ 1' 07"
9	Amanda Spratt (AUS)	Team BikeExchange–Jayco	+ 1' 09"
10	Julie De Wilde (BEL)	Plantur–Pura	+ 1' 18"

== Classification leadership table ==
Stage	Winner	General classification	Points classification	Mountain classification	Young rider classification	Combativity classification
1	Lorena Wiebes	Lorena Wiebes	Lorena Wiebes	Karlijn Swinkels	Eleonora Gasparrini	Chloe Hosking
2	Lorena Wiebes	Lorena Wiebes	Lorena Wiebes	Karlijn Swinkels	Lonneke Uneken	Georgia Baker
3	Charlotte Kool	Lorena Wiebes	Lorena Wiebes	Lorena Wiebes	Lonneke Uneken	Sophie Wright
4	Riejanne Markus	Lorena Wiebes	Lorena Wiebes	Kirstie van Haaften	Eleonora Gasparrini	Kirstie van Haaften
5	Audrey Cordon-Ragot	Lorena Wiebes	Lorena Wiebes	Kirstie van Haaften	Mischa Bredewold	Audrey Cordon-Ragot
6	Mischa Bredewold	Lorena Wiebes	Lorena Wiebes	Kirstie van Haaften	Mischa Bredewold	Amanda Spratt
Final Classification		Lorena Wiebes	Lorena Wiebes	Kirstie van Haaften	Mischa Bredewold	-
