= 2022 Postnord Vårgårda WestSweden =

2022 Postnord UCI WWT Vårgårda West Sweden
2022 UCI Women's World Tour, race 18 of 23

Race details
- Dates: 7 August 2022
- Stages: 1
- Distance: 125.7 km (78.1 mi)
- Winning time: 3h 10' 47"

Results
	Winner	Audrey Cordon-Ragot (FRA)	(Trek–Segafredo)
	Second	Pfeiffer Georgi (GBR)	(Team DSM)
	Third	Valerie Demey (BEL)	(Liv Racing Xstra)

The 2022 Postnord UCI WWT Vårgårda West Sweden was a women's bicycle race and was the 18th round of the 2022 UCI Women's World Tour. It was held on 7 August 2022, in Vårgårda, Sweden, the day after the 2022 Postnord Vårgårda WestSweden TTT.

== Teams ==
Fourteen professional teams, and the Swedish national teams, each with a maximum of six riders, started the race:

UCI Women's WorldTeams

- Canyon//SRAM
- FDJ Suez Futuroscope
- Liv Racing Xstra
- Movistar Team
- Roland Cogeas Edelweiss Squad
- Team BikeExchange–Jayco
- Team DSM
- Team Jumbo–Visma
- SD Worx
- Trek–Segafredo

UCI Women's Continental Teams

- Ceratizit–WNT Pro Cycling
- Parkhotel Valkenburg
- Team Coop–Hitec Products
- Valcar–Travel & Service

National teams:

- Sweden

== Results ==
Final general classification

Rank	Rider	Team	Time
1	Audrey Cordon-Ragot (FRA)	Trek–Segafredo	3h 10' 47"
2	Pfeiffer Georgi (GBR)	Team DSM	+ 0"
3	Valerie Demey (BEL)	Liv Racing Xstra	+ 6"
4	Lorena Wiebes (NED)	Team DSM	+ 10"
5	Barbara Guarischi (ITA)	Movistar Team	+ 12"
6	Tamara Dronova	Roland Cogeas Edelweiss Squad	+ 12"
7	Nicole Steigenga (NED)	Team Coop–Hitec Products	+ 12"
8	Tereza Neumanová (CZE)	Liv Racing Xstra	+ 12"
9	Emilia Fahlin (SWE)	FDJ Suez Futuroscope	+ 12"
10	Shari Bossuyt (BEL)	Canyon//SRAM	+ 12"
