= Czech National Time Trial Championships =

National road cycling championship in the Czech Republic

The Czech National Time Trial Championships were created in 2000.

== Men ==
Year	Gold	Silver	Bronze
2001	Ondřej Sosenka	Michal Kalenda	Michal Hrazdíra
2002	Ondřej Sosenka	Michal Hrazdíra	Michal Kalenda
2003	Michal Hrazdíra	Radek Blahut	Ondřej Sosenka
2004	Michal Hrazdíra	Ondřej Sosenka	Lubor Tesař
2005	Ondřej Sosenka	Michal Hrazdíra	Milan Kadlec
2006	Ondřej Sosenka	Milan Kadlec	František Raboň
2007	Stanislav Kozubek	René Andrle	Jan Faltynek
2008	František Raboň	Jan Hruška	René Andrle
2009	František Raboň	Stanislav Kozubek	Tomáš Okrouhlický
2010	František Raboň	Jan Bárta	Leopold König
2011	Jiří Hudeček	Jan Bárta	Tomáš Okrouhlický
2012	Jan Bárta	Zdeněk Štybar	František Raboň
2013	Jan Bárta	Vojtěch Hačecký	Tomáš Okrouhlický
2014	Jan Bárta	Petr Vakoč	Zdeněk Štybar
2015	Jan Bárta	Leopold König	Petr Vakoč
2016	Leopold König	Jan Bárta	Petr Vakoč
2017	Jan Bárta	Petr Vakoč	Josef Černý
2018	Josef Černý	Jan Bárta	Michael Kukrle
2019	Jan Bárta	Josef Černý	Petr Vakoč
2020	Josef Černý	Jan Bárta	Adam Ťoupalík
2021	Josef Černý	Jan Bárta	Adam Ťoupalík
2022	Jan Bárta	Michael Kukrle	Jakub Otruba

== Women ==
Year	Gold	Silver	Bronze
2000	Lada Kozlíková	Julie Pekárková	Karla Polívková
2001	Lada Kozlíková		
2002	Lada Kozlíková	Julie Pekárková	Pavla Havlíková
2003	Ilona Bublová	Julie Pekárková	Pavla Havlíková
2005	Lada Kozlíková		
2006	Lada Kozlíková	Martina Růžičková	Jarmila Machačová
2007	Tereza Huříková	Martina Růžičková	Martina Sáblíková
2008	Jarmila Machačová	Martina Růžičková	Martina Sáblíková
2009	Tereza Huříková	Martina Růžičková	Jarmila Machačová
2010	Martina Sáblíková	Martina Růžičková	Gabriela Slámová
2011	Martina Sáblíková	Martina Růžičková	Jarmila Machačová
2012	Jarmila Machačová	Martina Sáblíková	Pavlína Šulcová
2013	Martina Sáblíková	Katarína Hranaiová	Pavlína Šulcová
2014	Martina Sáblíková	Pavlína Šulcová	Anežka Drahotová
2015	Martina Sáblíková	Jarmila Machačová	Martina Růžičková
2016	Martina Sáblíková	Jarmila Machačová	Anežka Drahotová
2017	Nikola Nosková	Jarmila Machačová	Tereza Korvasová
2018	Tereza Korvasová	Jarmila Machačová	Melissa van Neck
2019	Tereza Korvasová	Jarmila Machačová	Nikola Bajgerová
2020	Nikola Nosková	Markéta Hájková	Tereza Korvasová
2021	Nikola Nosková	Jarmila Machačová	Nikol Flašarová
2022	Denisa Slámová	Nikola Bajgerová	Petra Ševčíková
2023	Eliška Kvasničková	Kristýna Burlová	Nikola Bajgerová
