= 2022 UCI Women's World Tour =

Series of women's road cycling races

- Seventh edition of the UCI Women's World Tour

Details
- Dates: 5 March – 9 October 2022
- Location: Europe
- Races: 23

Champions
- Individual champion: Annemiek van Vleuten (Movistar Team)
- Teams' champion: SD Worx

The 2022 UCI Women's World Tour was a competition that included twenty-three road cycling events throughout the 2022 women's cycling season. It was the seventh edition of the UCI Women's World Tour, the ranking system launched by the Union Cycliste Internationale (UCI) in 2016. The competition began with Strade Bianche on 5 March, and finished with the final stage of the Tour de Romandie Féminin on 9 October.

Dutch rider Annemiek van Vleuten (Movistar Team) became the first rider to win the individual classification for a third time, having previously won the 2018 and 2021 titles. She won four overall victories during the season, including the Giro Donne and the inaugural Tour de France Femmes - becoming the first woman to complete a Giro–Tour double in the same year.

Second place went to fellow Dutch rider Lorena Wiebes (Team DSM) who won three events. Third place was taken by Elisa Longo Borghini (Trek–Segafredo) for the second year in succession - Borghini won five events, including Paris–Roubaix Femmes. Twelve different riders won races, with five riders holding the individual classification lead during the season.

As in previous years, the teams classification was won by SD Worx - their sixth win in seven seasons. The youth classification was won by Dutch rider Shirin van Anrooij (Trek–Segafredo).

== Events ==
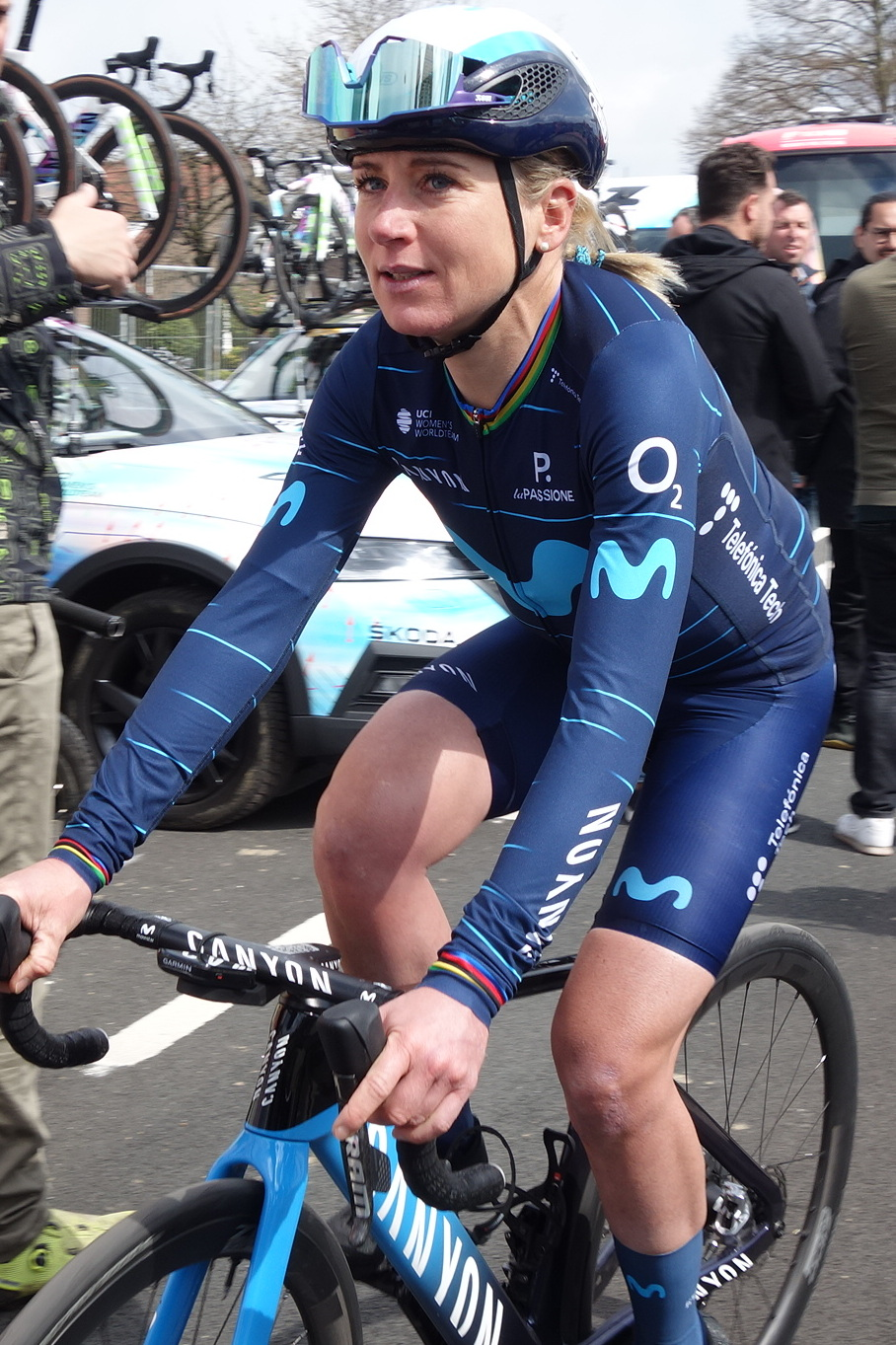
Annemiek van Vleuten (pictured at the Amstel Gold Race) won the overall classification

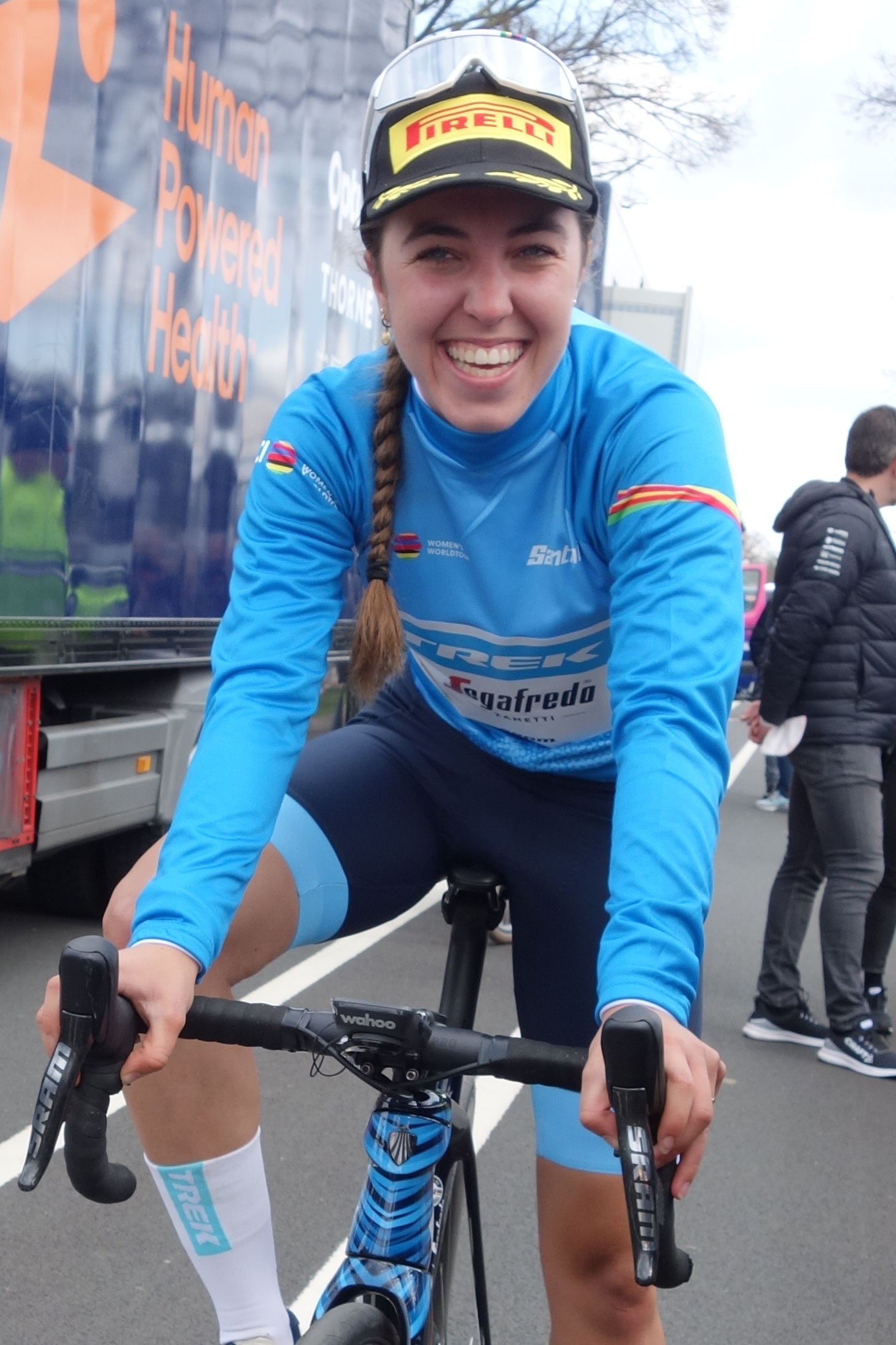
Shirin van Anrooij (pictured at the Amstel Gold Race) won the youth classification

The race calendar for the 2022 season was announced in June 2021, with twenty-four races initially scheduled – up from eighteen that were held in 2021. The calendar featured several new events, including Tour de France Femmes. The Giro Donne also returned to the calendar, following promises of live television coverage. In September 2021, the Tour de Romandie Féminin was added to make a total of twenty-five races. The two Chinese races were cancelled in June 2022, making a total of twenty-three races.

2022 UCI Women's World Tour
Race	Date	First	Second	Third	Leader
(Italy) Strade Bianche Donne	5 March	Lotte Kopecky (BEL)	Annemiek van Vleuten (NED)	Ashleigh Moolman (RSA)	Lotte Kopecky (BEL)
(Netherlands) Ronde van Drenthe	12 March	Lorena Wiebes (NED)	Elisa Balsamo (ITA)	Lotte Kopecky (BEL)	Lotte Kopecky (BEL)
(Italy) Trofeo Alfredo Binda-Comune di Cittiglio	20 March	Elisa Balsamo (ITA)	Sofia Bertizzolo (ITA)	Soraya Paladin (ITA)	Elisa Balsamo (ITA)
(Belgium) Classic Brugge–De Panne	24 March	Elisa Balsamo (ITA)	Lorena Wiebes (NED)	Marta Bastianelli (ITA)	Elisa Balsamo (ITA)
(Belgium) Gent–Wevelgem	27 March	Elisa Balsamo (ITA)	Marianne Vos (NED)	Maria Giulia Confalonieri (ITA)	Elisa Balsamo (ITA)
(Belgium) Tour of Flanders	3 April	Lotte Kopecky (BEL)	Annemiek van Vleuten (NED)	Chantal van den Broek-Blaak (NED)	Elisa Balsamo (ITA)
(Netherlands) Amstel Gold Race	10 April	Marta Cavalli (ITA)	Demi Vollering (NED)	Liane Lippert (GER)	Elisa Balsamo (ITA)
(France) Paris–Roubaix Femmes	16 April	Elisa Longo Borghini (ITA)	Lotte Kopecky (BEL)	Lucinda Brand (NED)	Lotte Kopecky (BEL)
(Belgium) La Flèche Wallonne Femmes	20 April	Marta Cavalli (ITA)	Annemiek van Vleuten (NED)	Demi Vollering (NED)	Lotte Kopecky (BEL)
(Belgium) Liège–Bastogne–Liège Femmes	24 April	Annemiek van Vleuten (NED)	Grace Brown (AUS)	Demi Vollering (NED)	Lotte Kopecky (BEL)
(Spain) Itzulia Women	13–15 May	Demi Vollering (NED)	Pauliena Rooijakkers (NED)	Kristen Faulkner (USA)	Lotte Kopecky (BEL)
(Spain) Vuelta a Burgos Feminas	19–22 May	Juliette Labous (FRA)	Évita Muzic (FRA)	Demi Vollering (NED)	Demi Vollering (NED)
(United Kingdom) RideLondon Classique	27–29 May	Lorena Wiebes (NED)	Elisa Balsamo (ITA)	Emma Norsgaard (DEN)	Lotte Kopecky (BEL)
(United Kingdom) The Women's Tour	6–11 June	Elisa Longo Borghini (ITA)	Grace Brown (AUS)	Katarzyna Niewiadoma (POL)	Lotte Kopecky (BEL)
(Italy) Giro Donne	30 June–10 July	Annemiek van Vleuten (NED)	Marta Cavalli (ITA)	Margarita Victoria García (ESP)	Elisa Balsamo (ITA)
Tour de France Femmes	24–31 July	Annemiek van Vleuten (NED)	Demi Vollering (NED)	Katarzyna Niewiadoma (POL)	Annemiek van Vleuten (NED)
Postnord Vårgårda WestSweden TTT	6 August	Trek–Segafredo	SD Worx	Team DSM	Annemiek van Vleuten (NED)
Postnord Vårgårda WestSweden RR	7 August	Audrey Cordon-Ragot (FRA)	Pfeiffer Georgi (GBR)	Valerie Demey (BEL)	Annemiek van Vleuten (NED)
(Norway) / (Denmark) / (Sweden) Tour of Scandinavia	9–14 August	Cecilie Uttrup Ludwig (DEN)	Liane Lippert (GER)	Alexandra Manly (AUS)	Annemiek van Vleuten (NED)
(France) Classic Lorient Agglomération	27 August	Margarita Victoria García (ESP)	Amber Kraak (NED)	Grace Brown (AUS)	Annemiek van Vleuten (NED)
(Netherlands) Simac Ladies Tour	30 August – 4 September	Lorena Wiebes (NED)	Audrey Cordon-Ragot (FRA)	Karlijn Swinkels (NED)	Annemiek van Vleuten (NED)
(Spain) Challenge by La Vuelta	7–11 September	Annemiek van Vleuten (NED)	Elisa Longo Borghini (ITA)	Demi Vollering (NED)	Annemiek van Vleuten (NED)
(Switzerland) Tour de Romandie Féminin	7–9 October	Ashleigh Moolman (RSA)	Annemiek van Vleuten (NED)	Elisa Longo Borghini (ITA)	Annemiek van Vleuten (NED)

=== Cancelled events ===
Due to COVID-19-related logistical concerns raised by teams regarding travel to Australia (including strict quarantine requirements), the Cadel Evans Great Ocean Road Race was cancelled. In June 2022, the planned Chinese races (Tour of Chongming Island and Tour of Guangxi) were cancelled as the organisers did not wish to stage the events due to the COVID-19 pandemic in mainland China.

== Teams ==
The fourteen Women's WorldTeams were automatically invited to compete in events, with the three best 2021 UCI Women's Continental Teams (Ceratizit–WNT Pro Cycling, Parkhotel Valkenburg and Valcar–Travel & Service) also invited automatically. Other Continental women's teams were invited by the organisers of each race.

- Canyon//SRAM
- EF Education–Tibco–SVB
- FDJ Suez Futuroscope
- Human Powered Health
- Liv Racing Xstra
- Movistar Team
- Roland Cogeas Edelweiss Squad
- SD Worx
- Team BikeExchange–Jayco
- Team DSM
- Team Jumbo–Visma
- Trek–Segafredo
- UAE Team ADQ
- Uno-X Pro Cycling Team
