= Team Dukla Praha =

Team Dukla Praha may refer to:

- Team Dukla Praha (men's team), a professional cycling team that competes on the UCI Continental Tours
- Team Dukla Praha (women's team), a professional cycling team that competes on the UCI Women's World Tour
