= Jan Bárta =

Czech road cyclist

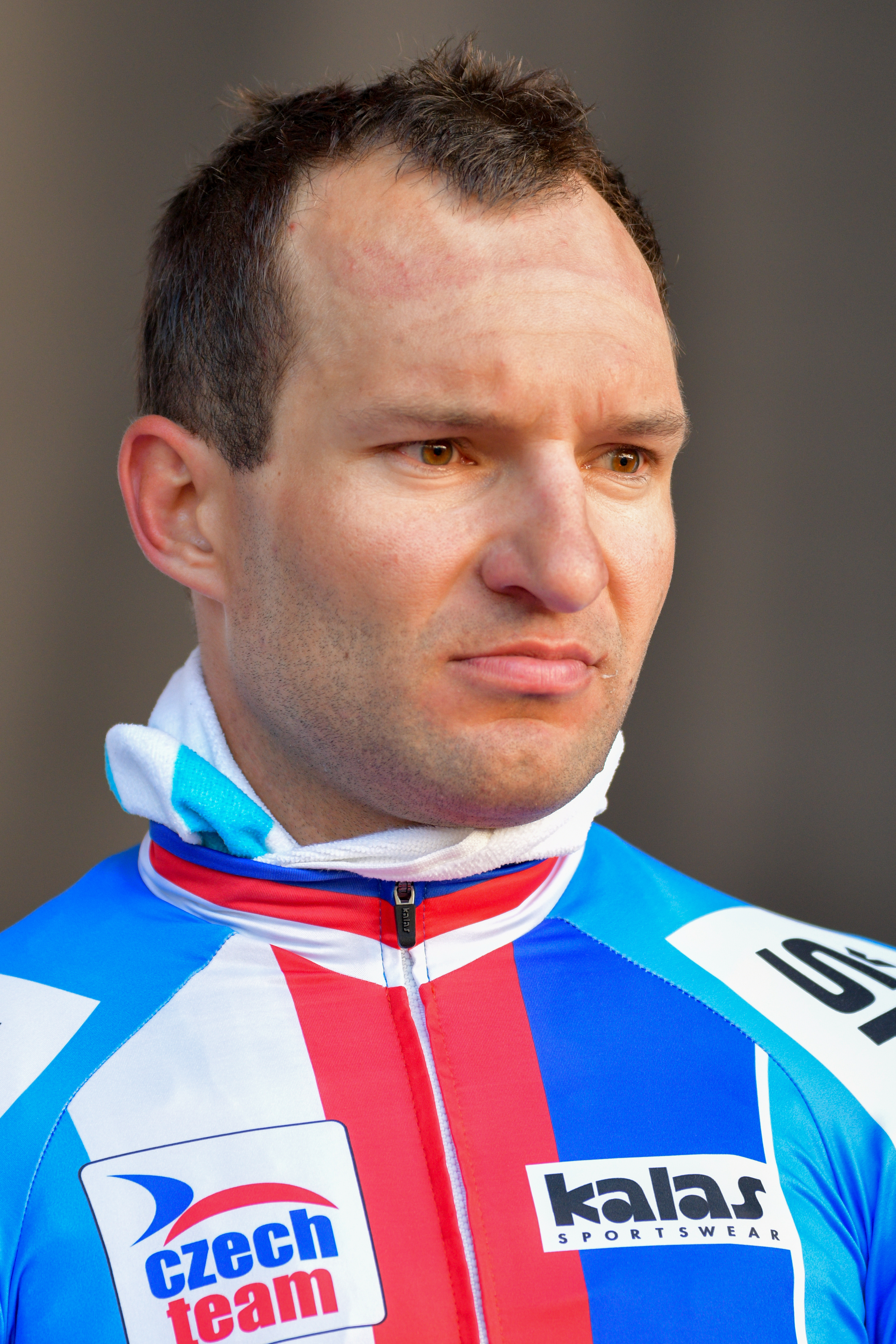
- Bárta at the 2018 UCI Road World Championships

Personal information
- Full name: Jan Bárta
- Born: 7 December 1984 (age 41): Kyjov, Czechoslovakia; (now Czech Republic)
- Height: 1.84 m (6 ft 1/2 in)
- Weight: 73 kg (161 lb)

Cycling career
- Sport: Cycling
- Current team: Kasper Crypto4me
- Discipline: Road
- Role: Rider
- Rider type: Time trialist; Breakaway specialist

Amateur teams
- 2003: CK Attack PVT
- 2007: DT–Specialized Mix

Professional teams
- 2005–2006: PSK Whirlpool–Hradec Krlove
- 2007: IVP Vienna
- 2008–2009: Arbö–KTM–Junkers
- 2010–2017: Team NetApp
- 2018–: Elkov–Author

Major wins
- Single-day races and Classics National Time Trial Championships (2012–2015, 2017, 2019, 2022) National Road Race Championships (2013) Rund um Köln (2012)
Medal record
Men's road bicycle racing
Representing Czech Republic
World Championships
Silver medal – second place	2009 Mendrisio	Under-23 time trial
European Games
Bronze medal – third place	2019 Minsk	Time trial

Jan Bárta (born 7 December 1984) is a Czech professional road cyclist, who rides for UCI Continental team Kasper Crypto4me.

== Major results ==
2003
1st Road race, National Under-23 Road Championships
2007
7th Overall Tour de Hongrie
9th Prague–Karlovy Vary–Prague
2008
2nd Raiffeisen Grand Prix
2009
1st Stage 4 Tour of Austria
3rd Overall Rás Tailteann
2010
2nd Time trial, National Road Championships
4th Prague–Karlovy Vary–Prague
7th Overall Tour de Normandie
7th Overall Okolo Slovenska
2011
2nd Time trial, National Road Championships
3rd Overall Tour of Britain
8th Overall Tour of Austria
2012
1st Time trial, National Road Championships
1st Overall Settimana Internazionale di Coppi e Bartali

1st Stages 2b (TTT) & 5 (ITT)

1st Rund um Köln
7th Time trial, UCI Road World Championships
2013
National Road Championships

1st Road race
1st Time trial

1st Overall Szlakiem Grodów Piastowskich

1st Points classification
1st Stage 2 (ITT)

2nd Overall Circuit de la Sarthe
3rd Overall Bayern Rundfahrt
6th Overall Czech Cycling Tour
2014
National Road Championships

1st Time trial
3rd Road race

6th Overall Bayern Rundfahrt
6th Visegrad 4 Bicycle Race – GP Czech Republic
9th Time trial, UCI Road World Championships
9th Overall Tour of Britain
10th Overall Driedaagse van West-Vlaanderen
Combativity award Stage 3 Tour de France
2015
1st Time trial, National Road Championships
2nd Overall Czech Cycling Tour
3rd Overall Bayern Rundfahrt
4th Overall Driedaagse van West-Vlaanderen
Combativity award Stage 3 Tour de France
2016
2nd Time trial, National Road Championships
3rd Overall Tour of Slovenia
2017
1st Time trial, National Road Championships
2nd Overall Czech Cycling Tour
10th Time trial, UEC European Road Championships
2018
National Road Championships

2nd Road race
2nd Time trial

4th Overall Szlakiem Walk Majora Hubala
4th Overall Szlakiem Grodów Piastowskich
7th Overall Sibiu Cycling Tour
8th Overall Okolo Jižních Čech
2019
1st Time trial, National Road Championships
1st Overall Tour du Loir-et-Cher
1st Prologue Tour de Hongrie
European Games

3rd Time trial
9th Road race

4th Overall Rhône-Alpes Isère Tour
5th Overall Tour of Romania
6th Overall Dookoła Mazowsza
6th Overall Czech Cycling Tour
Combativity award Overall Tour Alsace
2020
2nd Time trial, National Road Championships
9th Time trial, UEC European Road Championships
2021
1st Overall Course de Solidarność et des Champions Olympiques

1st Stage 4

2nd Time trial, National Road Championships
10th Overall Circuit des Ardennes
2022
National Road Championships

1st Time trial
2nd Road race

7th Overall Tour of Małopolska
2023
6th Overall Tour du Pays de Montbéliard

=== Grand Tour general classification results timeline ===
Grand Tour	2012	2013	2014	2015	2016	2017
Giro d'Italia	65	—	—	—	—	127
Tour de France	—	—	71	25	88	—
Vuelta a España	—	96	—	—	—	—

Legend
—	Did not compete
DNF	Did not finish
