= 2022 Amstel Gold Race (women's race) =

Cycling race

2022 Amstel Gold Race Ladies Edition
2022 UCI Women's World Tour, race 7 of 23
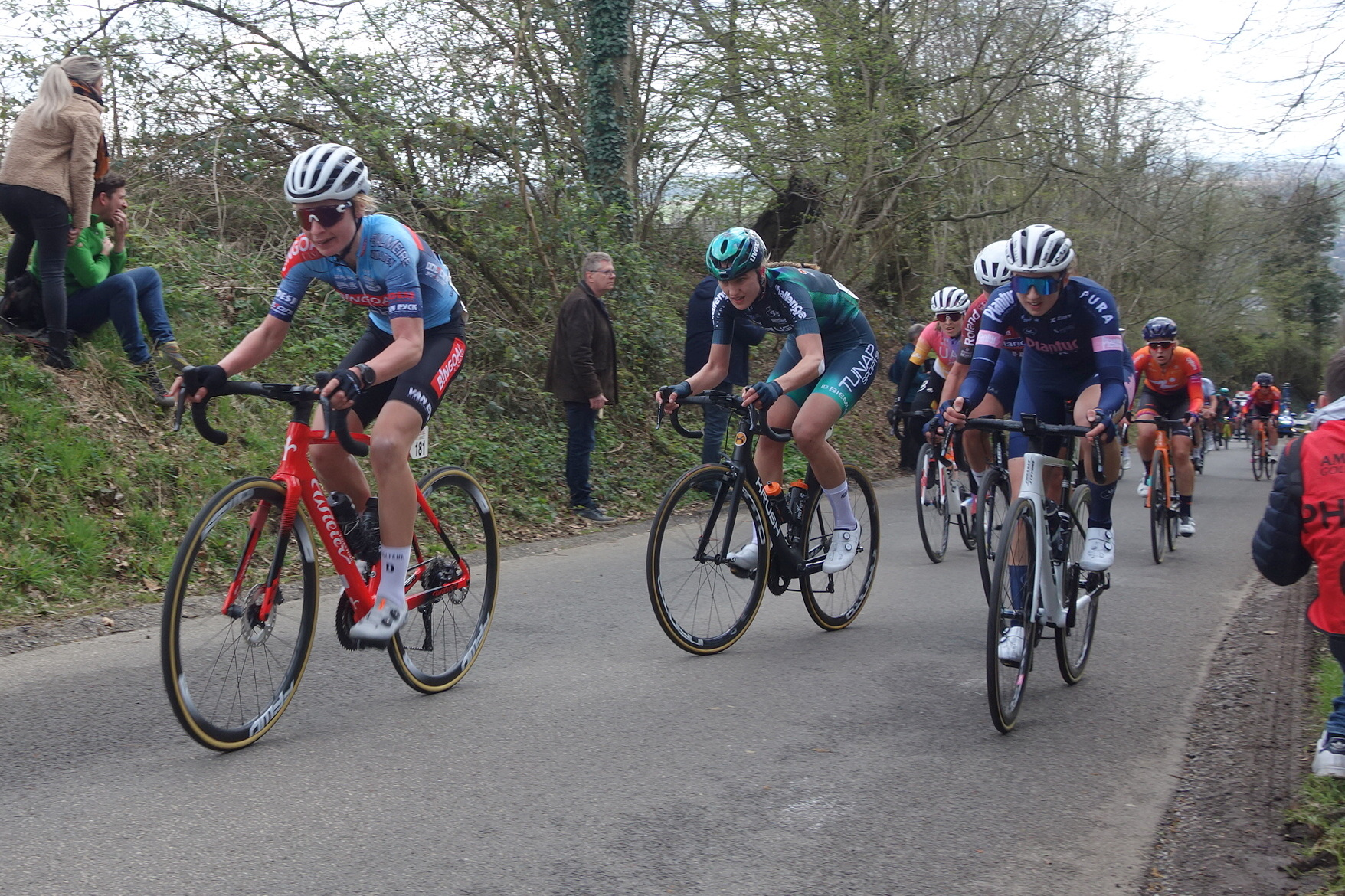
- Riders climbing the Eyserbosweg

Race details
- Dates: 10 April 2022
- Stages: 1
- Distance: 128.5 km (79.85 mi)
- Winning time: 3h 17' 41"

Results
	Winner	Marta Cavalli (ITA)	(FDJ Nouvelle-Aquitaine Futuroscope)
	Second	Demi Vollering (NED)	(SD Worx)
	Third	Liane Lippert (GER)	(Team DSM)

The 2022 Amstel Gold Race Ladies Edition was a Dutch road cycling one-day race held on 10 April 2022. It was the 8th edition of the Amstel Gold Race for women, and the 7th event of the 2022 UCI Women's World Tour.

The race was won after a 1.5 km breakaway the Italian Marta Cavalli (FDJ Nouvelle-Aquitaine Futuroscope) ahead of Demi Vollering (SD Worx) and Liane Lippert (Team DSM).

== Results ==
Result
Rank	Rider	Team	Time
1	Marta Cavalli (ITA)	FDJ Nouvelle-Aquitaine Futuroscope	3h 17' 41"
2	Demi Vollering (NED)	SD Worx	+ 4"
3	Liane Lippert (GER)	Team DSM	+ 4"
4	Annemiek van Vleuten (NED)	Movistar Team	+ 4"
5	Katarzyna Niewiadoma (POL)	Canyon–SRAM	+ 4"
6	Margarita Victoria García (ESP)	UAE Team ADQ	+ 4"
7	Ashleigh Moolman (RSA)	SD Worx	+ 7"
8	Elisa Balsamo (ITA)	Trek–Segafredo	+ 9"
9	Coryn Labecki (USA)	Team Jumbo–Visma	+ 9"
10	Sofia Bertizzolo (ITA)	UAE Team ADQ	+ 9"

== See also ==
- 2022 in women's road cycling
