= Nikola Nosková =

Czech cyclist (born 1997)

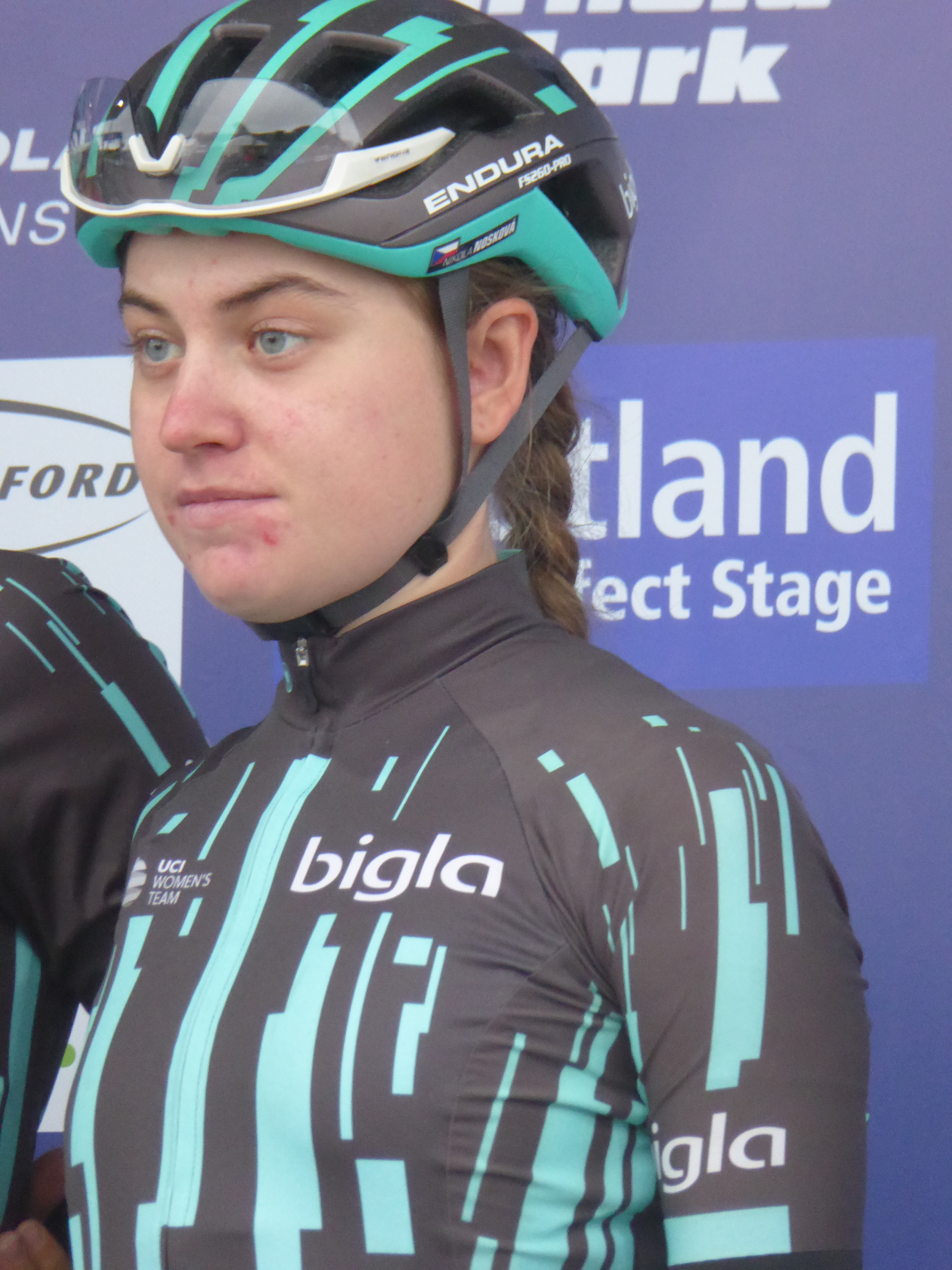
- Nosková at the 2019 Women's Tour of Scotland

Personal information
- Full name: Nikola Nosková
- Born: 1 July 1997 (age 29) Jablonec nad Nisou, Czech Republic

Cycling career
- Sport: Cycling
- Current team: Cofidis
- Disciplines: Cyclo-cross; Road
- Role: Rider

Amateur team
- 2022: Force-SportRaces

Professional teams
- 2017–2018: Bepink–Cogeas
- 2019–2020: Bigla Pro Cycling
- 2021: SD Worx
- 2023: Zaaf Cycling Team
- 2023: Massi–Tactic
- 2024–: Cofidis

Nikola Nosková (born 1 July 1997) is a Czech road cyclist and cyclo-cross racer, who rides for UCI Women's ProTeam Cofidis. During her career, Nosková has won the Czech National Time Trial Championships three times and the Czech National Road Race Championships once.

== Career ==
As a junior, she competed on the road in the junior events at the 2014 UCI Road World Championships and 2015 UCI Road World Championships.

She won the silver medal in the women's under-23 event at the 2016 UCI Cyclo-cross World Championships in Heusden-Zolder and took the bronze in the under-23 race on home soil at the 2017 UEC European Cyclo-cross Championships in Tábor. In 2017 she also won both the Czech National Road Race Championships and the Czech National Time Trial Championships.

At the 2018 European Road Cycling Championships in Brno, Czech Republic, Nosková won two medals on home soil, taking the bronze in the under-23 time trial before winning the under-23 road race title. Nosková broke away from the peloton in a three rider group alongside under-23 time trial winner Aafke Soet and Elena Pirrone; they built up a lead of three-and-a-half minutes over the bunch before Nosková launched a solo attack with about 65 kilometres (40 miles) to go, crossing the finish line with a nearly four-minute lead over Soet in second. In August 2018, the then-named Cervélo–Bigla Pro Cycling announced that she would join them for the 2019 season. She remained with the team until it folded during the 2020 season.

In September 2020, Nosková signed a contract with the SD Worx team for the 2021 season, but left the team at the end of the season.

== Major results ==
2014
National Junior Road Championships

1st Road race
1st Time trial

4th Road race, UCI World Junior Championships
2015
1st Mountains classification, Tour de Feminin – O cenu Českého Švýcarska
3rd Road race, National Junior Road Championships
UEC European Junior Championships

6th Road race
8th Time trial

2016
4th Road race, National Road Championships
2017
National Road Championships

1st Road race
1st Time trial

1st Giro del Trentino Alto Adige-Südtirol
6th Overall Emakumeen Euskal Bira

1st Young rider classification

6th Overall Tour Cycliste Féminin International de l'Ardèche

1st Young rider classification

7th Durango-Durango Emakumeen Saria
2018
UEC European Under-23 Championships

1st Road race
3rd Time trial

2nd Road race, National Road Championships
6th Overall Tour de Feminin – O cenu Českého Švýcarska
2019
3rd Giro dell'Emilia Internazionale Donne Elite
6th La Classique Morbihan
9th Overall Women's Tour of Scotland

1st Young rider classification

10th Overall Tour Cycliste Féminin International de l'Ardèche
2020
National Road Championships

1st Time trial
4th Road race

2021
National Road Championships

1st Time trial
3rd Road race

2022
National Road Championships

4th Road race
4th Time trial

2023
3rd Vuelta a la Comunitat Valenciana Feminas
2024
2nd Time trial, National Road Championships
8th Overall Setmana Ciclista Valenciana
9th Overall Tour Féminin International des Pyrénées

1st Mountains classification

2026
Combativity award Stage 1 Tour de France
