= 2022 UEC European Track Championships – Women's elimination race =

Women's elimination race at the 2022 UEC European Track Championships
- Venue: Messe München, Munich
- Date: 13 August
- Competitors: 17 from 17 nations

Medalists
gold medal	Lotte Kopecky	Belgium
silver medal	Pfeiffer Georgi	Great Britain
bronze medal	Mylène de Zoete	Netherlands

The women's elimination race competition at the 2022 UEC European Track Championships was held on 13 August 2022.

== Results ==
Rank	Name	Nation
1st place, gold medalist(s)	Lotte Kopecky	Belgium
2nd place, silver medalist(s)	Pfeiffer Georgi	Great Britain
3rd place, bronze medalist(s)	Mylène de Zoete	Netherlands
4	Valentine Fortin	France
5	Michelle Andres	Switzerland
6	Olivija Baleišytė	Lithuania
7	Lea Lin Teutenberg	Germany
8	Alžbeta Bačíková	Slovakia
9	Patrycja Lorkowska	Poland
10	Argiro Milaki	Greece
11	Alice Sharpe	Ireland
12	Letizia Paternoster	Italy
12	Kateřina Kohoutková	Czech Republic
12	Eukene Larrarte	Spain
15	Verena Eberhardt	Austria
16	Daniela Campos	Portugal
17	Kseniia Fedotova	Ukraine
