= Kirstie van Haaften =

Dutch cyclist (born 1999)

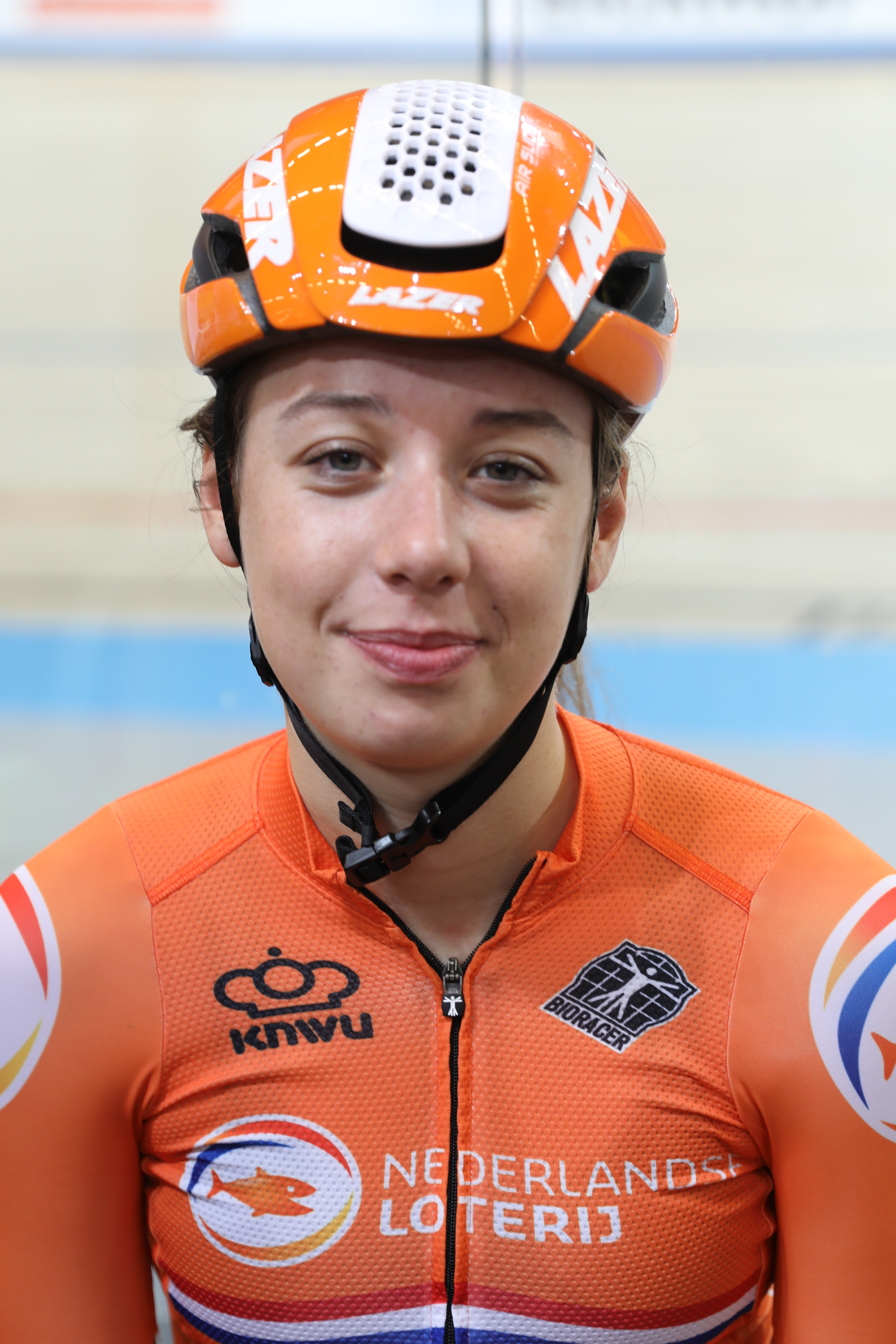
- Van Haaften in 2019

Personal information
- Full name: Kirstie van Haaften
- Born: 21 January 1999 (age 27)

Cycling career
- Sport: Cycling
- Current team: VolkerWessels Women Cyclingteam
- Disciplines: Road; Track
- Role: Rider

Professional teams
- 2019: Health Mate–Cyclelive Team
- 2020: Ciclotel
- 2021–: Parkhotel Valkenburg

Kirstie van Haaften (born 21 January 1999) is a Dutch professional racing cyclist, who currently rides for UCI Women's Continental Team VolkerWessels Women Cyclingteam.

== Major results ==
2016
1st Stage 1 (TTT) Energiewacht Tour Juniors
2017
9th EPZ Omloop van Borsele
2019
6th EPZ Omloop van Borsele
8th Dwars door de Westhoek
2021
10th GP Eco-Struct
2022
4th Leiedal Koerse
Mountain classification 2022 Holland Ladies Tour
