= Scarlett Souren =

Dutch cyclist (born 2003)

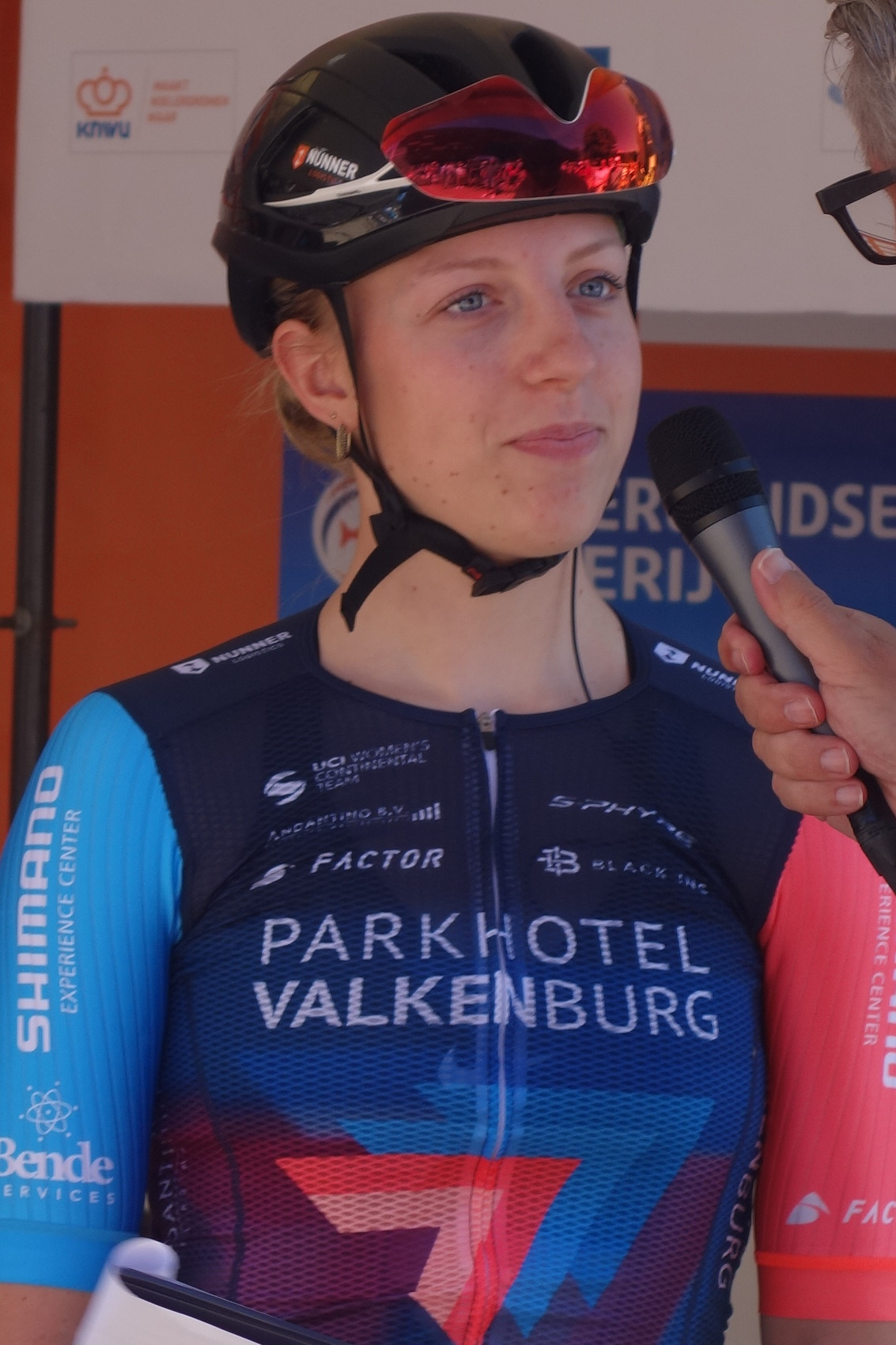
- Souren in 2023

Personal information
- Born: 4 December 2003 (age 22)

Cycling career
- Sport: Cycling
- Current team: VolkerWessels Women Cyclingteam
- Discipline: Road
- Role: Rider

Amateur team
- 2021–2022: WV Schijndel

Professional team
- 2023–: Parkhotel Valkenburg
Medal record
Women's road bicycle racing
Representing Netherlands
European Championships
Silver medal – second place	2024 Limburg	Under-23 road race

Scarlett Souren (born 4 December 2003) is a Dutch racing cyclist, who currently rides for UCI Women's Continental Team VolkerWessels Women Cyclingteam.

== Major results ==
2021
3rd Time trial, National Junior Championships
8th Overall Watersley Women's Challenge
2022
1st Trofee Maarten Wynants
1st Wim Hendriks Trofee
5th Omloop van Borsele
8th Leiedal Koerse
9th Overall Watersley Women's Challenge
9th Grote Prijs Beerens
2023
2nd Egmont Cycling Race
2024
1st Grote Prijs Yvonne Reynders
1st Prologue Giro della Toscana Int. Femminile – Memorial Michela Fanini
2nd Road race, UEC European Under-23 Championships
2nd Overall Tour de Pologne Women

1st Stage 3

2nd Trofee Maarten Wynants
2nd Argenta Classic-2 Districtenpijl
2nd Festival Elsy Jacobs Luxembourg
3rd Cyclis Classic
3rd Overall Tour of Chongming Island

1st Youth rider classification

4th GP Eco-Struct
4th Veenendaal–Veenendaal Classic
5th Omloop van Borsele
5th La Choralis Fourmies Féminine
6th Grand Prix Mazda Schelkens
7th Overall Princess Anna Vasa Tour
2025
1st Argenta Classic - Deurne
