= Martina Růžičková =

Czech cyclist

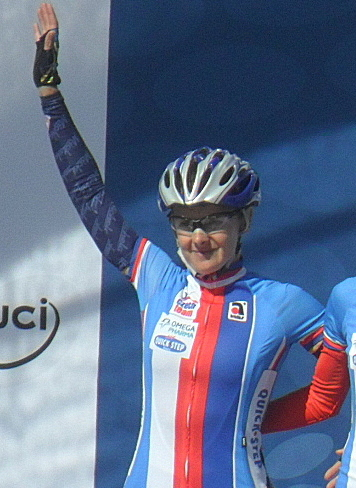
- Martina Růžičková at the 2012 UCI Road World Championships

Personal information
- Born: 22 March 1980 (age 46) Roudnice nad Labem, Czechoslovakia

Cycling career
- Sport: Cycling
- Current team: Retired
- Disciplines: Road; Track
- Role: Rider

Amateur team
- 2015: Koga Ladies Cycling Team

Professional teams
- 2007–2009: Elk Haus
- 2010–2012: SC Michela Fanini Record Rox
- 2013: Pasta Zara–Cogeas
- 2014: Forno d'Asolo–Astute

Martina Růžičková (born 22 March 1980) is a Czech former racing cyclist. She competed in the women's road race at the 2004 Summer Olympics, in the 2012 UCI women's road race in Valkenburg aan de Geul and in the 2013 UCI women's road race in Florence.

== Major results ==
2004
1st Road race, National Road Championships
2006
National Road Championships

2nd Time trial
3rd Road race

2007
National Road Championships

1st Road race
2nd Time trial

4th Overall Gracia–Orlová
2008
National Road Championships

1st Road race
2nd Time trial

3rd Individual pursuit, International Track Challenge Vienna
7th Overall Gracia–Orlová
2009
National Road Championships

1st Road race
2nd Time trial

International Track Challenge Vienna

1st Individual pursuit
3rd Points race
3rd Scratch

3rd Overall Tour de Feminin-O cenu Českého Švýcarska
10th Memorial Davide Fardelli
2010
National Road Championships

2nd Road race
2nd Time trial

6th Memorial Davide Fardelli
2011
National Road Championships

2nd Road race
2nd Time trial

2012
2nd Road race, National Road Championships
7th Overall Tour de Bretagne Féminin
2013
3rd Grand Prix el Salvador
2015
1st Scratch, Six Days of Bremen
3rd Time trial, National Road Championships
