= Tereza Korvasová =

Czech cyclist

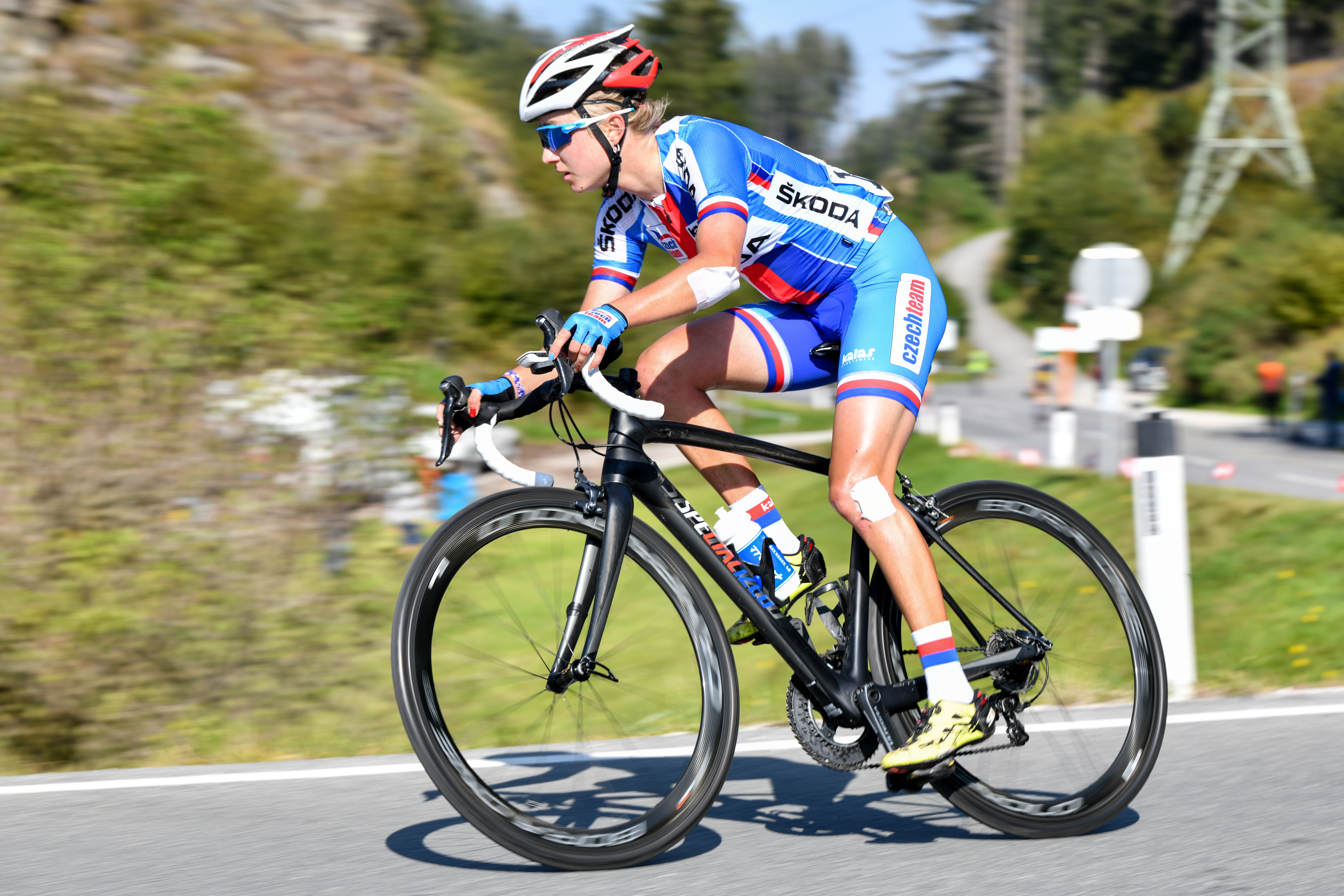
- Korvasová at the 2018 UCI Road World Championships

Personal information
- Full name: Tereza Korvasová
- Born: 29 June 1996 (age 30)

Cycling career
- Sport: Cycling
- Discipline: Road
- Role: Rider

Amateur teams
- 2015–2016: Sokol Louny
- 2017: Team Dukla Praha
- 2019–2020: Team Dukla Praha

Professional teams
- 2018: Team Dukla Praha
- 2021: Servetto–Makhymo–Beltrami TSA

Tereza Korvasová (born 29 June 1996) is a Czech racing cyclist, who rode for UCI Women's Continental Team Servetto–Makhymo–Beltrami TSA.

== Career ==
Prior to taking up cycling she was an accomplished distance runner at junior level, winning 13 championship titles in athletics. In 2014, Korvasová was fourth in the junior category in the European Mountain Running Championships, and helped the Czech Republic to the team bronze in the junior competition in the World Mountain Running Championships.

Korvasová took up cycle racing in 2015, initially alongside continuing her running career, using cycling as a form of cross-training. She initially competed in cycling for Sokol Louny. That year Korvasová also finished fourth in the junior competitions at the European Mountain Running Championships and the World Mountain Running Championships. She was also part of the Czech team that won the gold medal in the latter. Korvasová also enjoyed success in race walking, becoming Czech junior champion in the 3 kilometres walk in 2015, competing in the junior category at the 2015 European Race Walking Cup and finishing 20th in the 10 kilometres race walk at the 2015 European Athletics Junior Championships.

In 2017, she joined Team Dukla Praha. In June 2018 Korvasová won the Czech National Time Trial Championships, and the following month she won another gold medal in the time trial at the World University Cycling Championships. She rode in the women's time trial event at the 2018 UCI Road World Championships.

== Personal life ==
Korvasová is a student at Masaryk University, specialising in Political Science and European Studies.
