= Tereza Neumanová =

Czech cyclist

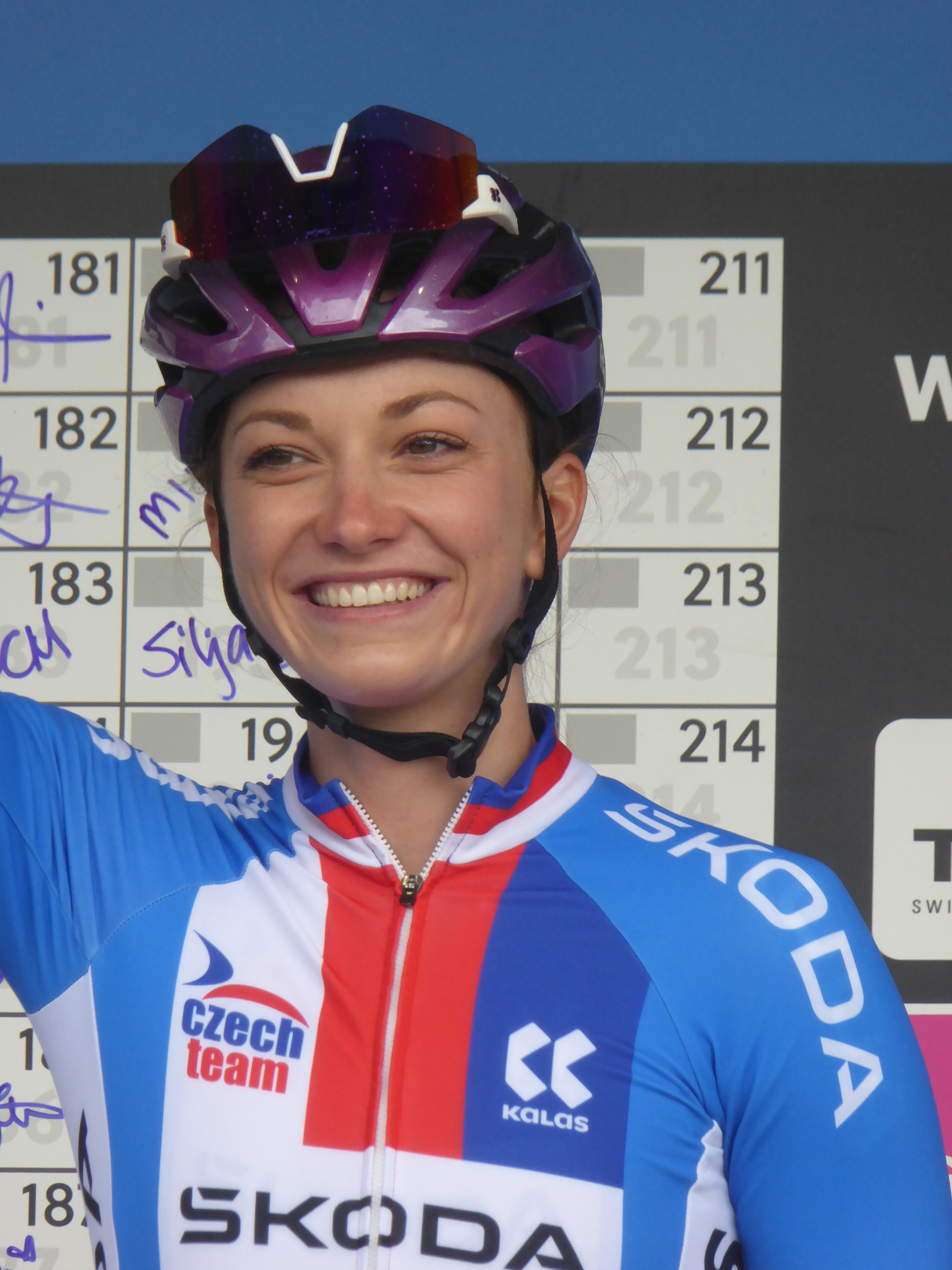

Personal information
- Full name: Tereza Neumanová
- Born: 9 August 1998 (age 28)

Cycling career
- Sport: Cycling
- Current team: UAE Team L'Imad
- Disciplines: Road; Mountain biking
- Role: Rider

Amateur teams
- 2017: Team Dukla Praha
- 2019: Team Dukla Praha

Professional teams
- 2018: Team Dukla Praha
- 2021: Burgos Alimenta Women Cycling Sport
- 2022—2023: Liv Racing TeqFind
- 2024—2025: UAE Team ADQ

Tereza Neumanová (born 9 August 1998) is a Czech professional racing cyclist, who last rode for UCI Women's WorldTeam UAE Team ADQ. She rode in the women's road race at the 2019 UCI Road World Championships in Yorkshire, England.

== Major results ==
2017
2nd Road race, National Road Championships
6th Horizon Park Women Challenge
2019
1st Road race, National Road Championships
2020
2nd Road race, National Road Championships
2021
1st Road race, National Road Championships
2022
1st Road race, National Road Championships
8th Postnord Vårgårda WestSweden
2023
4th Road race, National Road Championships
2024
5th Tour of Chongming Island
2025
5th Vuelta CV Feminas
5th Clásica de Almería
9th Omloop van het Hageland
