= Tomáš Okrouhlický =

Czech road cyclist

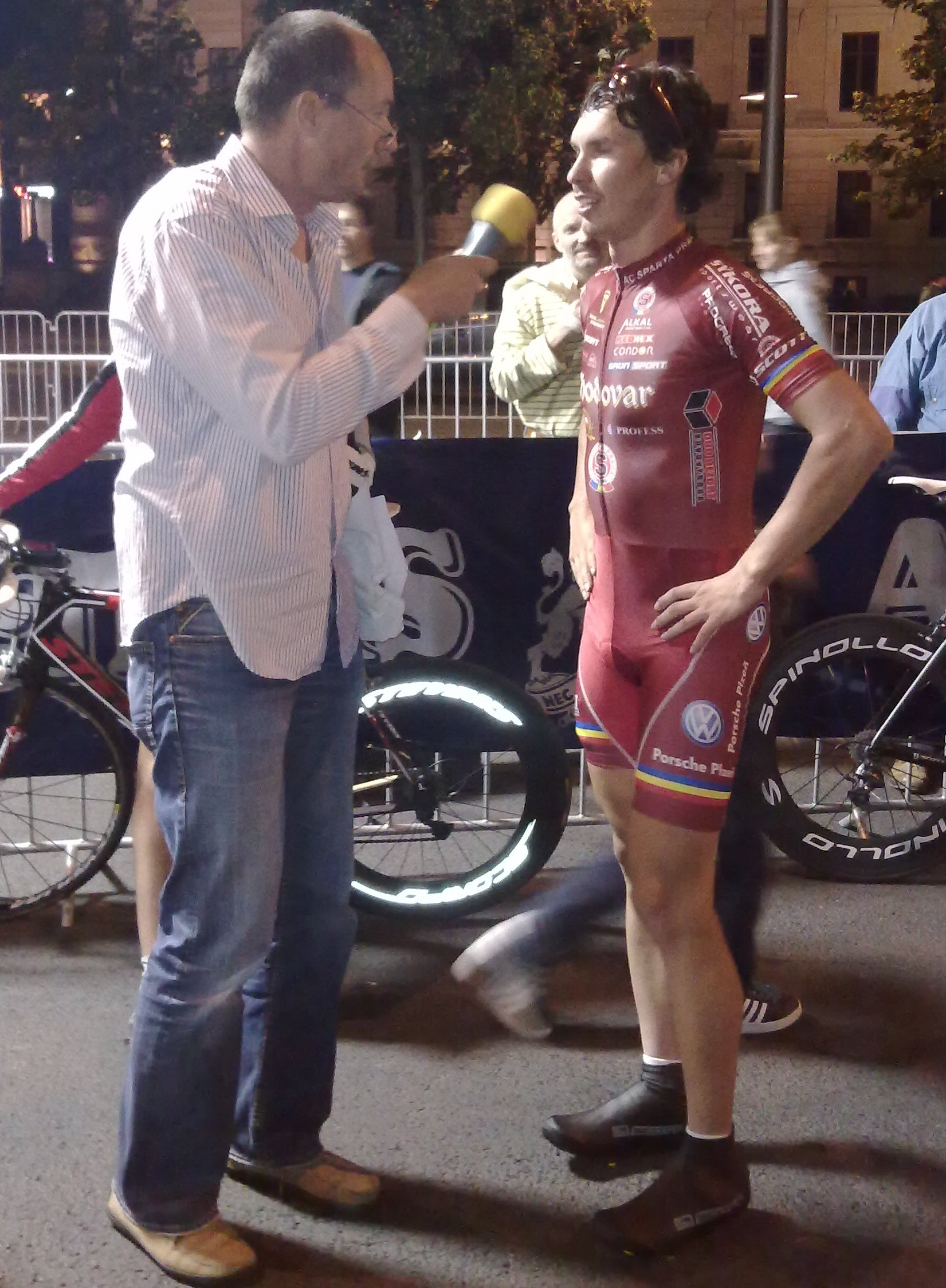

Personal information
- Born: 4 November 1985 (age 40) Prague, Czech Republic

Cycling career
- Sport: Cycling
- Current team: Retired
- Discipline: Road
- Role: Rider

Amateur teams
- 2007: CK Královice
- 2016–2017: Lawi–Author
- 2018: Lawi Stars Giant

Professional teams
- 2008–2014: AC Sparta Praha
- 2015: CK Příbram Fany Gastro

Tomáš Okrouhlický (born 4 November 1985) is a Czech former road cyclist.

== Major results ==
2008
2nd Tour de Vysočina
2009
3rd Time trial, National Road Championships
9th Rogaland GP
2010
4th Raiffeisen Grand Prix
5th Time trial, National Road Championships
2011
3rd Time trial, National Road Championships
6th Rutland–Melton CiCLE Classic
2012
2nd Tour de l'Oder
5th Time trial, National Road Championships
2013
1st Stage 7 An Post Rás
3rd Time trial, National Road Championships
5th Tour Bohemia
2014
1st Stages 6 & 7 (ITT) Bałtyk–Karkonosze Tour
4th Time trial, National Road Championships
2015
2nd Rund um den Sachsenring
4th Time trial, National Road Championships
10th Duo Normand
2016
4th Time trial, National Road Championships
2017
5th Visegrad 4 Kerekparverseny
6th Time trial, National Road Championships
