= Audrey Cordon-Ragot =

French racing cyclist

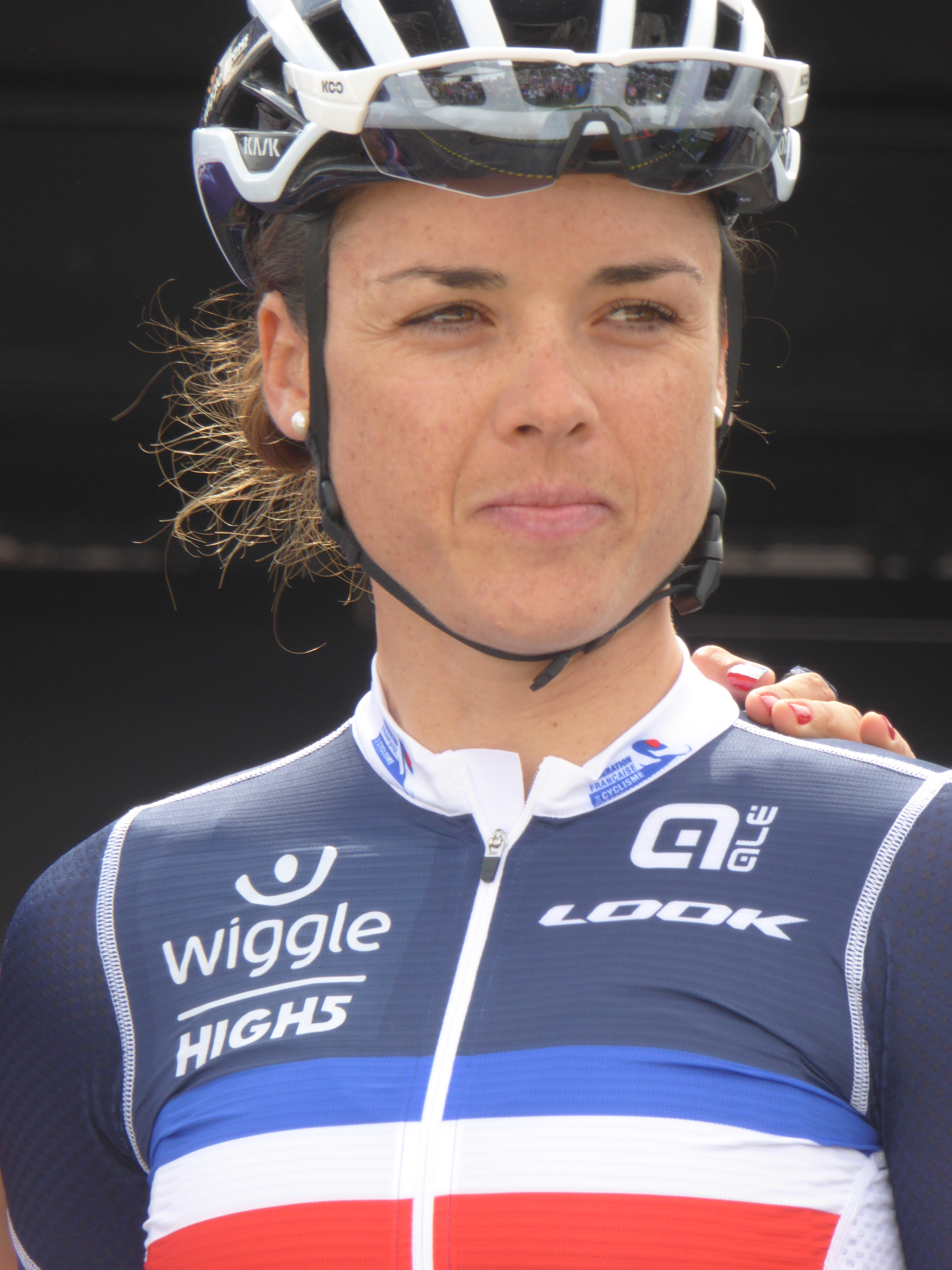
- Cordon-Ragot at the 2018 European Road Cycling Championships.

Personal information
- Full name: Audrey Cordon-Ragot
- Born: Audrey Cordon; 22 September 1989 (age 37) Pontivy, France
- Height: 170 cm (5 ft 7 in)
- Weight: 60 kg (132 lb)

Cycling career
- Sport: Cycling
- Disciplines: Road; Track; Cyclo-cross
- Rider type: Time trialist

Professional teams
- 2008–2013: Vienne Futuroscope
- 2014: Team Hitec Products
- 2015–2018: Wiggle–Honda
- 2019–2022: Trek–Segafredo
- 2023: Zaaf Cycling Team
- 2023–2024: Human Powered Health

Major wins
- Stage races Tour de Bretagne Féminin (2013) One day races GP de Plumelec-Morbihan (2012, 2014) Cholet Pays de Loire (2012, 2015) National Time Trial Championships (2015, 2016, 2021, 2022, 2024) National Road Race Championships (2020, 2022)
Medal record
Women's road bicycle racing
Representing France
World Championships
Silver medal – second place	2023 Glasgow	Mixed team relay
European Championships
Gold medal – first place	2023 Drenthe	Mixed team relay

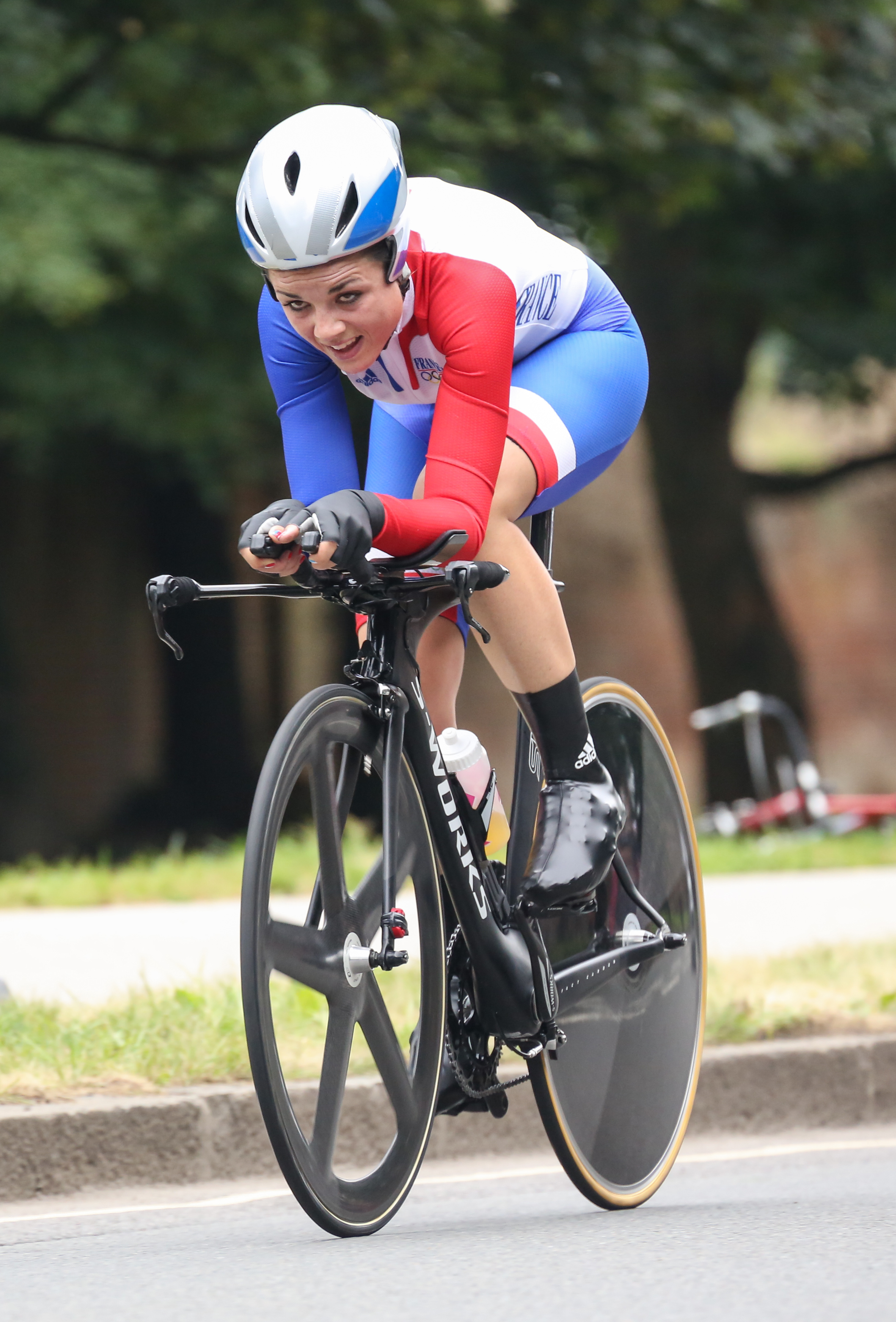
Audrey Cordon competing in the 2012 Olympics time trial in London

Audrey Cordon-Ragot (née Cordon; born 22 September 1989) is a French former road bicycle racer, who last rode for UCI Women's WorldTeam Human Powered Health.

== Career ==
She competed at the 2012 Summer Olympics in the Women's road race, but finished over the time limit. In the Women's time trial she finished 15th.

In 2013, Cordon won the general classification of the five-day Tour de Bretagne Féminin.

In October 2014, it was announced that Cordon-Ragot would join the Wiggle–Honda team in 2015 as a super-domestique, following her fellow Team Hitec Products rider Elisa Longo Borghini to the British-based squad.

In 2015 and 2016 she won the French National Time Trial Championships.

She also competed at the 2016 Summer Olympics in Rio de Janeiro. In the Women's road race she finished 37th, in the Women's time trial she finished 24th.

In 2017 she won the mountains classification jersey of the Women's Tour.

In September 2022, Cordon-Ragot announced via Twitter that she would not compete with the French national team at the 2022 UCI Road World Championships in Australia as expected, for health reasons; in a later press release, it was announced that Cordon-Ragot had suffered a stroke.

Having spent four seasons with the Trek–Segafredo team, Cordon-Ragot was scheduled to join a new B&B Hotels women's team for the 2023 season. Due to financial issues, the team did not materialise and Cordon-Ragot ultimately signed a contract with the Zaaf Cycling Team for the 2023 season.

In April 2023, Cordon-Ragot resigned from the Zaaf Cycling Team due to unpaid wages, stating "since the beginning of the year, I was not paid, nor have I been reimbursed for my travel expenses." and that she "could not continue under these conditions". The UCI subsequently allowed riders to move from Zaaf without penalty.

Cordon-Ragot subsequently joined the Human Powered Health team for the remainder of the 2023 season, racing the 2023 Paris–Roubaix Femmes in her first race for the team.

== Personal life ==
On 10 October 2014 she married cyclist Vincent Ragot.

== Major results ==
2007
3rd Calan Criterium
4th Time trial, UEC European Junior Road Championships
2008
2nd Team pursuit, UEC European Under-23 Track Championships
3rd Individual pursuit, National Track Championships
3rd Route Féminine Du Vignoble Nantais
3rd Lesneven Criterium
2009
2nd Road race, Brittany Regional Road Championships
10th Chrono Champenois
2010
1st Road race, West Interregional Road Championships
1st Road race, Brittany Regional Road Championships
1st Duo Normand
1st Calan Criterium
1st Stage 2 (TTT) Ronde de Bourgogne
1st Stage 2 (ITT) Tour de Charente-Maritime
3rd Grand Prix de France
2011
1st Road race, Brittany Regional Road Championships
1st Calan Criterium
Ronde de Bourgogne

1st Stages 2 (TTT) & 3

1st Stage 1 Tour de Charente-Maritime
2nd Road race, West Interregional Road Championships
2nd Duo Normand
3rd Time trial, National Road Championships
5th Time trial, UEC European Under-23 Road Championships
8th Cholet Pays de Loire Dames
2012
1st Road race, West Interregional Road Championships
1st Cholet Pays de Loire Dames
1st Crac'h Criterium
1st Calan Criterium
1st Grand Prix de Plumelec-Morbihan Dames
1st Classic Féminine Vienne Poitou-Charentes
2nd Time trial, National Road Championships
3rd Road race, Brittany Regional Road Championships
3rd Grand Prix Fémin'Ain
3rd Wanze Criterium
6th Overall Tour de Bretagne Féminin
10th Overall Gracia-Orlová
2013
1st Road race, Brittany Regional Road Championships
1st Overall Tour de Bretagne Féminin
1st Classic Féminine Vienne Poitou-Charentes
1st Crac'h Criterium
1st Saint-Gildas-de-Rhuys Criterium
1st Hennebont Criterium
2nd Time trial, National Road Championships
2nd Cholet Pays de Loire Dames
4th Road race, Jeux de la Francophonie
2014
1st Grand Prix de Plumelec-Morbihan Dames
2nd Overall Tour de Bretagne Féminin

1st Points classification
1st Stage 4

3rd Omloop van het Hageland
4th Overall La Route de France

1st Stage 5

5th Cholet Pays de Loire Dames
6th Chrono Champenois-Trophée Européen
2015
National Road Championships

1st Time trial
2nd Road race

1st Road race, Brittany Regional Road Championships
1st Cholet Pays de Loire
5th La Classique Morbihan
5th Grand Prix de Plumelec-Morbihan Dames
2016
National Road Championships

1st Time trial
3rd Road race

5th Time trial, UEC European Road Championships
6th Grand Prix de Plumelec-Morbihan Dames
10th Durango-Durango Emakumeen Saria
2017
1st Time trial, National Road Championships
1st Time trial, Brittany Regional Road Championships
1st Chrono des Nations
1st Mountains classification The Women's Tour
4th Grand Prix de Plumelec-Morbihan Dames
6th La Classique Morbihan
2018
1st Time trial, National Road Championships
3rd Overall Madrid Challenge by La Vuelta
3rd Chrono des Nations
4th Time trial, UEC European Road Championships
4th Cadel Evans Great Ocean Road Race
6th Amstel Gold Race
6th Tour of Guangxi
10th Omloop Het Nieuwsblad
10th Kreiz Breizh Elites Dames
2019
1st Overall Tour de Bretagne Féminin

1st Brittany rider classification

1st Acht van Westerveld
1st Postnord UCI WWT Vårgårda West Sweden TTT
2nd Time trial, National Road Championships
3rd Overall Belgium Tour
2020
National Road Championships

1st Road race
2nd Time trial

1st Stage 3 Tour Cycliste Féminin International de l'Ardèche
1st Stage 1 (TTT) Giro Rosa
UEC European Road Championships

5th Road race
10th Time trial

2021
National Road Championships

1st Time trial
2nd Road race

8th Donostia San Sebastián Klasikoa
8th Paris–Roubaix
2022
National Road Championships

1st Road race
1st Time trial

1st Postnord Vårgårda WestSweden
1st Postnord Vårgårda WestSweden TTT
2nd Overall Holland Ladies Tour

1st Stage 5 (ITT)

3rd Overall BeNe Ladies Tour
4th Time trial, UEC European Road Championships
10th GP de Plouay
2023
UEC European Championships

1st Team relay
4th Time trial

2nd Team relay, UCI Road World Championships
2nd Time trial, National Road Championships
2nd Omloop van Borsele
3rd Antwerp Port Epic Ladies
3rd Omloop van het Hageland
3rd Women Cycling Pro Costa De Almería
4th Overall Bretagne Ladies Tour
Tour de Normandie Féminin

4th Overall
4th Points classification

4th Le Samyn des Dames
6th Vuelta a la Comunitat Valenciana Feminas
10th Tijdrit Omloop van Borsele (ITT)
2024
1st Time trial, National Road Championships
4th Team relay, UCI Road World Championships
4th Omloop van Borsele
4th Tijdrit Omloop van Borsele (ITT)
9th Time trial, Olympic Games
