= 2022 Classic Lorient Agglomération =

Cycling race

2022 UCI Women's World Tour, race 20 of 23

Race details
- Dates: 27 August 2022
- Stages: 1
- Distance: 159.5 km (99.1 mi)
- Winning time: 4h 02' 16"

Results
| | Winner | Margarita Victoria García (ESP) | (UAE Team ADQ) |
| | Second | Amber Kraak (NED) | (Team Jumbo–Visma) |
| | Third | Grace Brown (AUS) | (FDJ Suez Futuroscope) |

The 2022 Classic Lorient Agglomération–Trophée Ceratizit was the twenty first edition of the Classic Lorient Agglomération, previously known as the GP de Plouay.

It was the twentieth round of the 2022 UCI Women's World Tour and was held on 27 August 2022, in Plouay, France.

== Teams ==
141 riders from 24 teams started the race. Each team has a maximum of six riders. 86 riders finished the race within the time limit.

UCI Women's WorldTeams

- Canyon//SRAM
- EF Education–EasyPost
- FDJ Suez Futuroscope
- Human Powered Health
- Liv Racing Xstra
- Movistar Team
- Roland Cogeas Edelweiss Squad
- Team BikeExchange–Jayco
- Team DSM
- Team Jumbo–Visma
- SD Worx
- Trek–Segafredo
- UAE Team ADQ

UCI Women's Continental Teams

- Arkéa–Samsic
- Ceratizit–WNT Pro Cycling
- Cofidis
- Emotional.fr–Tornatech–GSC Blagnac
- IBCT
- InstaFund Racing
- Le Col–Wahoo
- Parkhotel Valkenburg
- St. Michel–Auber93
- Stade Rochelais Charente-Maritime
- Valcar–Travel & Service

== Results ==
Final general classification

| Rank | Rider | Team | Time |
|---|---|---|---|
| 1 | Margarita Victoria García (ESP) | UAE Team ADQ | 4h 02' 16" |
| 2 | Amber Kraak (NED) | Team Jumbo–Visma | + 0" |
| 3 | Grace Brown (AUS) | FDJ Suez Futuroscope | + 5" |
| 4 | Ilaria Sanguineti (ITA) | Valcar–Travel & Service | + 5" |
| 5 | Gladys Verhulst (FRA) | Le Col–Wahoo | + 5" |
| 6 | Elise Chabbey (SUI) | Canyon//SRAM | + 5" |
| 7 | Tamara Dronova | Roland Cogeas Edelweiss Squad | + 5" |
| 8 | Blanka Vas (HUN) | SD Worx | + 5" |
| 9 | Juliette Labous (FRA) | Team DSM | + 8" |
| 10 | Audrey Cordon-Ragot (FRA) | Trek–Segafredo | + 11" |
