= Argenta Classic-2 Districtenpijl =

Women's cycling race in Belgium

Race details
- Date: July
- Region: Belgium
- Discipline: Road race
- Type: One-day
- Web site: www.argentaclassic.be

History
- First edition: 2022
- Editions: 4 (as of 2025)
- First winner: Daria Pikulik (POL)
- Most wins: Daria Pikulik (POL) (2 wins)
- Most recent: Scarlett Souren (NED)

The Argenta Classic-2 Districtenpijl is a women's road cycling race in Belgium. It has been held since 2022, and is classified by the Union Cycliste Internationale as a 1.1 event. In 2022, the race was known as Districtenpijl - Ekeren-Deurne.

The race takes place on a city circuit in Antwerp, connecting the districts of Deurne and Ekeren.

== Winners ==
| Year | Country | Rider | Team |
|---|---|---|---|
| 2022 | Poland | Daria Pikulik | ATOM Deweloper Posciellux.pl Wrocław |
| 2023 | Netherlands | Lieke Nooijen | Parkhotel Valkenburg |
| 2024 | Poland | Daria Pikulik | Human Powered Health |
| 2025 | Netherlands | Scarlett Souren | VolkerWessels Women Cyclingteam |
