= Mylène de Zoete =

Dutch cyclist (born 1999)

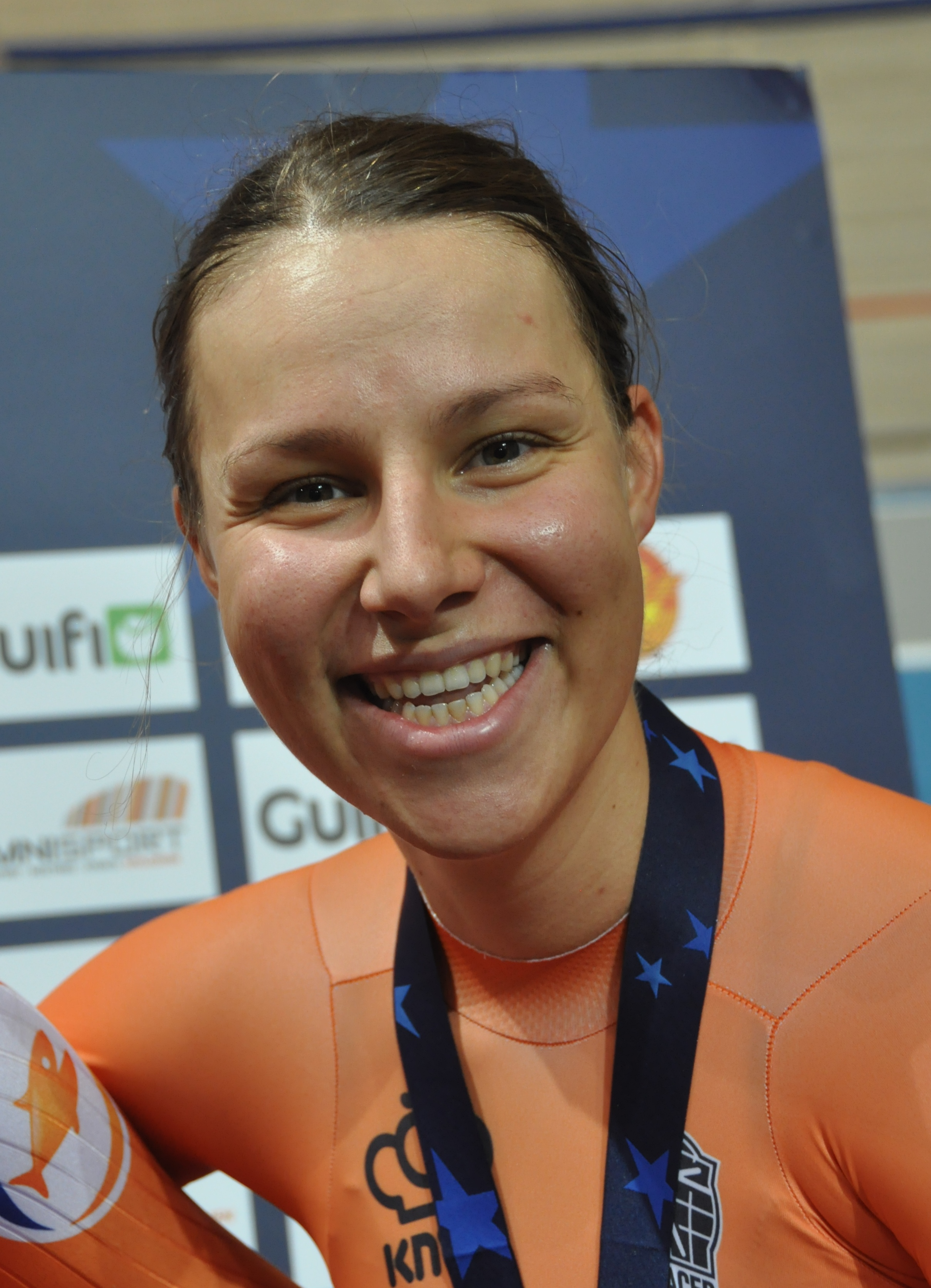
- de Zoete in 2021

Personal information
- Born: 3 January 1999 (age 27) Naaldwijk, Netherlands

Cycling career
- Sport: Cycling
- Current team: Ceratizit Pro Cycling
- Disciplines: Road; Track
- Role: Rider

Amateur team
- 2018–2020: RC Jan van Arckel

Professional teams
- 2020: NXTG Racing (stagiaire)
- 2021–2022: NXTG Racing
- 2023–: Ceratizit–WNT Pro Cycling
Medal record
Women's track cycling
Representing Netherlands
European Championships
Bronze medal – third place	2022 Munich	Elimination race
Junior World Championships
Silver medal – second place	2017 Montichiari	Scratch
Bronze medal – third place	2017 Montichiari	Omnium

Mylène de Zoete (born 3 January 1999) is a Dutch professional racing cyclist, who currently rides for UCI Women's WorldTeam Ceratizit Pro Cycling. She won a bronze medal in the elimination race at the 2022 UEC European Track Championships.

== Major results ==
=== Road ===
2022
4th Konvert Kortrijk Koerse
6th Omloop der Kempen Ladies
9th Vuelta CV
2023
2nd Overall Tour of Chongming Island

1st Stage 1

6th Binche-Chimay-Binche
7th Grote prijs Beerens
10th Omloop van het Hageland
2024
2nd Overall Tour of Chongming Island

1st stage 1

4th La Picto-Charentaise
8th Binche-Chimay-Binche
9th Festival Elsy Jacobs Luxembourg
9th La Choralis Fourmies
9th Grand Prix International d'Isbergues
2025
8th Trofeo Marratxi-Felanitx
9th Classic Brugge–De Panne Women
9th Copenhagen Sprint
