= Kristýna Burlová =

Czech road cyclist

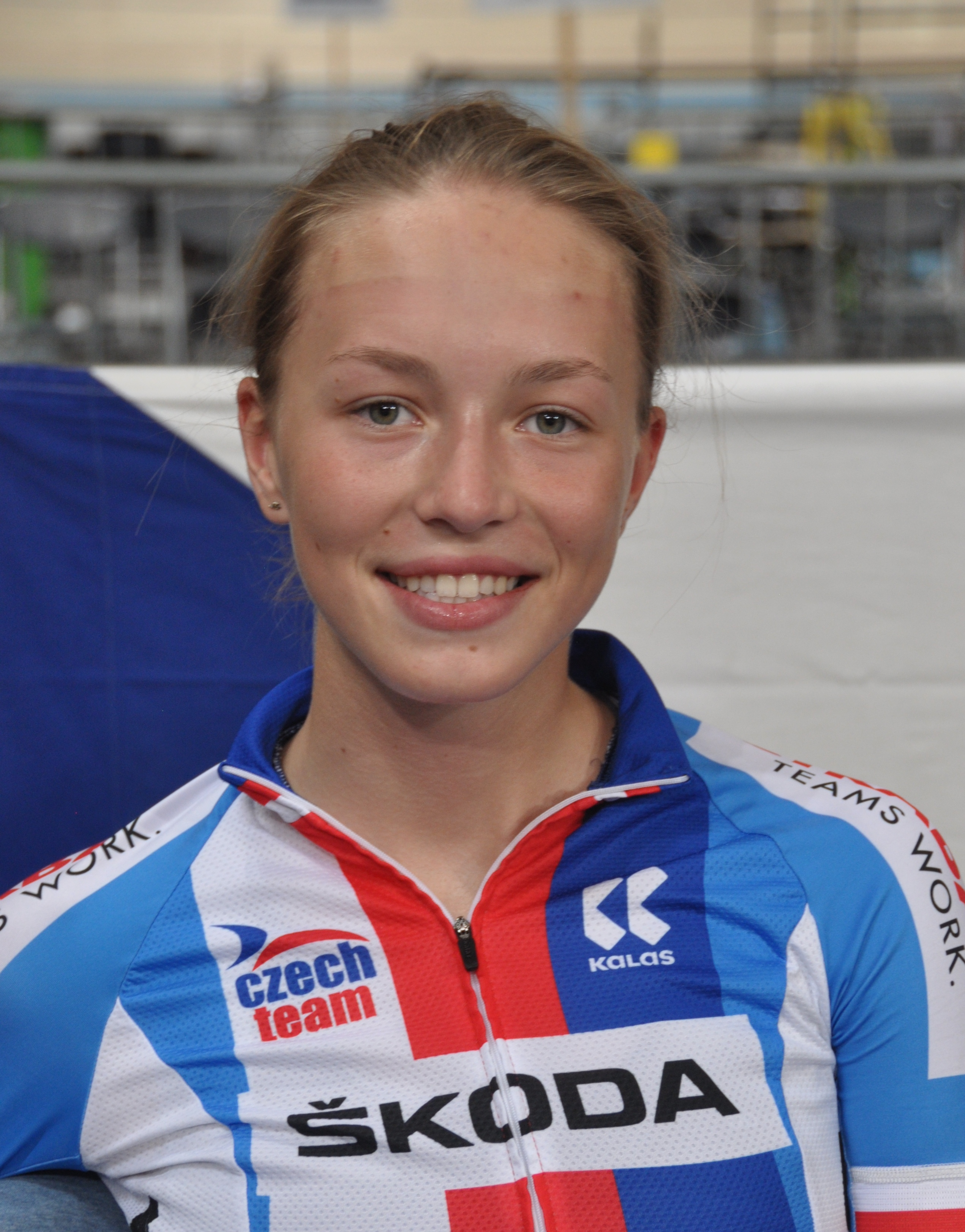
- Burlová in 2021

Personal information
- Born: 25 March 2002 (age 24) Plzeň, Czech Republic

Cycling career
- Sport: Cycling
- Current team: Cofidis
- Discipline: Road
- Role: Rider

Professional teams
- 2022–2023: Lotto–Soudal Ladies
- 2024: Lifeplus Wahoo
- 2024: Team Dukla Praha
- 2025: Ceratizit Pro Cycling
- 2026–: Cofidis

Major wins
- One-day races and Classics National Road Race Championships (2025)

Kristýna Burlová (born 25 March 2002) is a Czech road cyclist, who currently rides for UCI Women's ProTeam Cofidis.

== Major results ==
2020
1st Time trial, National Junior Championships
8th Road race, European Junior Championships
2021
National Championships

6th Time trial
7th Road race

2022
5th Time trial, National Championships
8th Flanders Diamond Tour
2023
National Championships

2nd Time trial
2nd Road race

6th Scheldeprijs
6th Flanders Diamond Tour
2024
National Championships

4th Road race
9th Time trial

6th Argenta Classic
2025
1st Road race, National Championships
5th Ronde de Mouscron
6th Festival Elsy Jacobs à Luxembourg
9th Schwalbe Women's One Day Classic
