= Melissa van Neck =

Czech cyclist

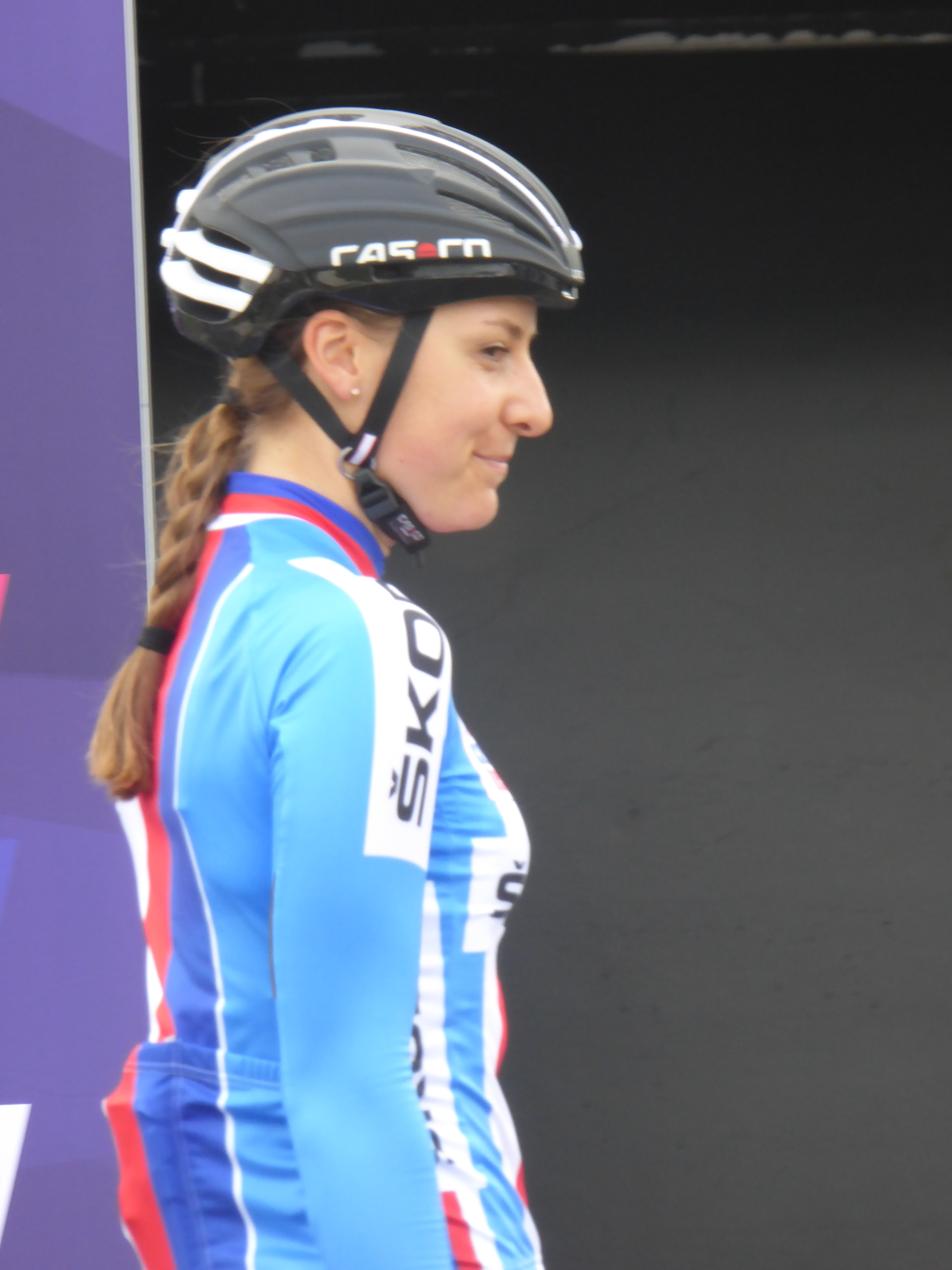
- Van Neck at the 2018 European Road Cycling Championships

Personal information
- Full name: Melissa van Neck
- Born: 13 October 1991 (age 35)

Cycling career
- Sport: Cycling
- Discipline: Road
- Role: Rider

Amateur team
- 2017: Team Dukla Praha

Professional teams
- 2018: Team Dukla Praha
- 2019–2020: Bepink
- 2021–2023: GT Krush Tunap

Melissa van Neck (born 13 October 1991) is a Czech professional racing cyclist, who rode for UCI Women's Continental Team GT Krush Rebellease Pro Cycling.
