= Team Dukla Praha (women's team) =

Team information
- Registered: Czech Republic
- Founded: 2018
- Status: UCI Women's Team (2018); National Team (2019–2022); UCI Women's Continental Team (2023–)

Team name history
- 2018–: Team Dukla Praha

Team Dukla Praha is a professional road bicycle racing women's team which participates in elite women's races.

== Team roster ==
Rider	Date of birth
Nikola Bajgerová (CZE)	31 January 1997 (age 29)
Ema Cetkovská (CZE)	8 February 1999 (age 27)
Barbora Dzerengová (CZE)	7 April 1999 (age 27)
Lucie Hochmann (CZE)	7 July 1993 (age 33)
Kateřina Kohoutková (CZE)	23 October 1998 (age 27)
Tereza Korvasová (CZE)	29 June 1996 (age 30)

Rider	Date of birth
Jarmila Machačová (CZE)	9 January 1986 (age 40)
Martina Mikulášková (CZE)	13 August 1993 (age 33)
Tereza Neumanová (CZE)	9 August 1998 (age 28)
Dana Pospíšilová (CZE)	4 April 1991 (age 35)
Melissa Van Neck (CZE)	13 October 1991 (age 34)

== Major results ==
2019
Tage des Querfeldeinsports Ternitz Cyclo-cross, Nikola Bajgerová

2023
Brilon Cup - Ostrava, Jarmila Machačová
Brilcon Cup - Vysoké Mýto, Jarmila Machačová

== National Champions ==
2018
Czech Time Trial, Tereza Korvasová
Czech Road Race, Jarmila Machačová
Czech Track (Individual Pursuit), Lucie Hochmann
Czech Track (Team Pursuit), Tereza Neumanová
Czech Track (Team Pursuit), Kateřina Kohoutková
Czech Track (Team Pursuit), Lucie Hochmann
Czech Track (Team Pursuit), Jarmila Machačová
Czech Track (Points race), Jarmila Machačová
Czech Track (Madison), Kateřina Kohoutková
Czech Track (Madison), Lucie Hochmann
Czech Track (Omnium), Jarmila Machačová

2019
Czech Time Trial, Tereza Korvasová
Czech Road Race, Tereza Neumanová
Czech Track (Omnium), Jarmila Machačová
Czech Track (Points race), Petra Ševčíková
Czech Junior Track (Omnium), Kristýna Burlová

2020
Czech Road Race, Jarmila Machačová

2021
Czech Track (Elimination race), Petra Ševčíková
Czech Track (Omnium), Jarmila Machačová
Czech Track (Madison), Katerina Kohoutkova
Czech Track (Madison), Petra Ševčíková
Czech Track (Points race), Jarmila Machačová
Czech Track (Scratch race), Jarmila Machačová
Czech Track (Individual pursuit), Jarmila Machačová

2023
Czech Road Race, Jarmila Machačová
