= 2022 Postnord Vårgårda WestSweden TTT =

2022 Postnord UCI WWT Vårgårda West Sweden Team time trial
2022 UCI Women's World Tour, race 17 of 23

Race details
- Dates: 6 August 2022
- Stages: 1
- Distance: 35.6 km (22.1 mi)
- Winning time: 44' 56"

Results
	Winner	Trek–Segafredo
	Second	SD Worx
	Third	Team DSM

The 2022 Postnord UCI WWT Vårgårda West Sweden Team time trial was a road bicycle race. It was the 17th round of the 2022 UCI Women's World Tour. It was held on 6 August 2022, in Vårgårda, Sweden. The team time trial was ridden on a 35.6-kilometre (22.1 mi) long course, starting in Vårgårda and going out and back to Herrljunga.

The race was won by the Trek–Segafredo team.

== Teams ==
Twelve professional teams, each with a maximum of six riders, started the race:

UCI Women's WorldTeams

- Canyon//SRAM
- FDJ Suez Futuroscope
- Movistar Team
- Roland Cogeas Edelweiss Squad
- SD Worx
- Team DSM
- Team Jumbo–Visma
- Trek–Segafredo

UCI Women's Continental Teams

- Ceratizit–WNT Pro Cycling
- Parkhotel Valkenburg
- Team Coop–Hitec Products
- Valcar–Travel & Service

== Results ==
Result
Rank	Team	Time
1	Trek–Segafredo	44' 56"
2	SD Worx	+ 38"
3	Team DSM	+ 49"
4	Team Jumbo–Visma	+ 1' 15"
5	FDJ Suez Futuroscope	+ 1' 41"
6	Canyon//SRAM	+ 2' 02"
7	Parkhotel Valkenburg	+ 2' 26"
8	Ceratizit–WNT Pro Cycling	+ 3' 11"
9	Valcar–Travel & Service	+ 3' 21"
10	Movistar Team	+ 3' 21"
11	Roland Cogeas Edelweiss Squad	+ 4' 23"
12	Team Coop–Hitec Products	+ 5' 11"
