= 2000 UCI Women's Road World Cup =

Series of bicycle races

- Third edition of the UCI Women's Road World Cup

Details
- Dates: 10 March – 8 September
- Location: Australia, Europe and North America
- Races: 7

Champions
- Individual champion: Diana Žiliūtė (LIT) (Acca Due O-Lorena Camicie)

The 2000 UCI Women's Road World Cup was the third edition of the UCI Women's Road World Cup. Seven rounds were contested; compared to 1999, the Trophée International and the New Zealand World Cup were dropped, while the Ladies Tour Beneden-Maas was replaced by the Rotterdam Tour. Diana Žiliūtė won the series for the second time, having won the inaugural series in 1998.

== Races ==
Date	Event	Location	Winner
10 March	Australia World Cup, Canberra	Australia	Anna Wilson (AUS)
18 March	Primavera Rosa	Italy	Diana Žiliūtė (LIT)
12 April	La Flèche Wallonne Féminine	Belgium	Geneviève Jeanson (CAN)
3 June	Coupe du Monde Cycliste Féminine de Montréal	Canada	Pia Sundstedt (FIN)
4 June	Liberty Classic	United States	Petra Rossner (GER)
27 August	Rotterdam Tour	Netherlands	Chantal Beltman (NED)
8 September	GP Suisse Féminin (Embrach)	Switzerland	Pia Sundstedt (FIN)

== Final classification ==
#	Cyclist	Points
1	Diana Žiliūtė (LTU)	230
2	Pia Sundstedt (FIN)	215
3	Mirjam Melchers (NED)	140
4	Chantal Beltman (NED)	122
5	Fabiana Luperini (ITA)	100
6	Susanne Ljungskog (SWE)	86
7	Petra Rossner (GER)	75
8	Geneviève Jeanson (CAN)	75
9	Anna Wilson (AUS)	75
10	Mirella van Melis (NED)	68

The
