= Toni Bradshaw =

New Zealand cyclist (born 1976)

Toni Strong
Personal information
- Born: Toni Janne Bradshaw; 25 February 1976 (age 50) New Zealand

Sport
- Country: New Zealand
- Sport: Triathlon; Road cycling
Medal record
Representing New Zealand
Women's road cycling
Oceania Road Cycling Championships
Bronze medal – third place	2005 Wanganui	Road race

Toni Janne Bradshaw (married name Strong; born 25 February 1976) is a former New Zealand triathlete and road cyclist. She represented her country at four UCI Road World Championships, in the 2005, 2006, 2007 and 2010, and at the 2006 Commonwealth Games. In 2005, she won the bronze medal in the women's road race at the Oceania Road Cycling Championships.

== Early life and education ==
Bradshaw was born on 25 February 1976. She studied at the University of Otago, graduating with a Bachelor of Physiotherapy in December 1997. Bradshaw later earned a Postgraduate Diploma in Sport Medicine from Otago in 2007.

== Triathlon ==
In 1997, Bradshaw represented New Zealand at the ITU triathlon age-group world championships in Perth, placing 24th in a time of 2:19:36 in the women's 20–24 year-old event. The following year, she won the Otago triathlon title, and finished 19th in the 20–24 years category at the age-group world championships in Lausanne, recording a time of 2:33:00.

In 1999, Bradshaw made her debut in the women's elite division at the New Zealand national triathlon championships, placing 11th, but later sustained a stress fracture and was unable to attend the age-group world championships in Montreal. In January 2000, she was third at the national championships, after taking a 20-second advantage into the run. Bradshaw said that she was "starting to feel good at the right time after having a bad patch" in the lead up to the 2000 age-group world championships in Perth, where she recorded a time of 2:17:58 in coming 17th in the women's 20–24 years division, after being in third place at the start of the final leg. Her coach, Jane Sullivan, said that a niggling hip injury hindered Bradshaw during the final run.

== Road cycling ==
=== 2001 ===
After suffering a second stress fracture in her hips, Bradshaw switched from triathlon to cycling at the beginning of 2001, saying that her body did not handle running. She impressed the national cycling selectors in a women's tour event in February 2001 and received a late call-up the following month into the New Zealand number two team for the New Zealand World Cup, the second round of the 2001 UCI Women's Road World Cup. However, she did not finish the race. The following month she won two cycling tours over successive weekends, the Tamahine Tour in Dunedin, and the Queenstown to Cromwell Easter cycling tour, defeating New Zealand representative Tammy Boyd in the later by 1 minute 20 seconds. After the races, Bradshaw commented that there was still "a lot of work to do yet" if she were to claim a permanent place on the New Zealand cycling team.

In the New Zealand national women's road race championship, held around Inglewood in October 2001, Bradshaw placed fifth.

=== 2002 ===
In January 2002, Bradshaw was the first woman to finish in the Lake Dunstan Challenge, won by Matthew Randall. Bradshaw's time of 2:19:44 was under the previous race record of 2:22:00 set by Greg Henderson two years earlier.

The following month, Bradshaw was named in the New Zealand road cycling team to compete in the first two rounds of the 2002 UCI Women's Road World Cup in Australia and New Zealand, and the Tour de Snowy in Australia. In the first of those events, the Australia World Cup raced over 103 kilometres from Cooma to Thredbo, she finished in 57th place. In the Tour de Snowy, Bradshaw was 35th on general classification, with a best finish of 27th on stage 4 of the tour. Four days later, in the New Zealand World Cup raced around Hamilton, she did not finish.

Bradshaw competed in the United States in the 2002 Women's Challenge in southern Idaho in June, finishing 73rd on general classification.

In July 2002, Bradshaw was a member of the Counties–Manukau team that won the 25-kilometre women's North Island team time trial at Rongotea, and four days later won the women's 50-kilometre road race at the David Black Memorial in Manawatū-Whanganui.

=== 2003 ===
Bradshaw finished eighth in the 2003 New Zealand women's road race championship.

=== 2004 ===
In February 2004, Bradshaw rode as part of the New Zealand 'B' team in the four-day Geelong Tour in Australia, finishing 49th on general classification. She followed that up four days later with a 66th-place finish in the Australia World Cup raced in Geelong, the first leg of the 2004 UCI Women's Road World Cup.

Bradshaw was a member of the eight-woman New Zealand squad that competed in the Giro d'Italia Femminile in July 2004; she placed 69th on general classification, with a best individual stage result of 46th on the seventh stage from Pozzo d'Adda to Oggiono. The same month, she was one of six New Zealand women on the six-day Thüringen Rundfahrt der Frauen, finishing 52nd overall. Bradshaw rounded out her 2004 European campaign with a 49th placing in the Sparkassen Giro Bochum in Germany.

After returning to New Zealand, Bradshaw achieved a seventh-place finish in the 25-kilometre national women's individual time-trial championship and was sixth in the national women's road race championship. In the Tour de Femme raced near Nelson in late December, Bradshaw won stage 4 with some aggressive riding and was fourth overall on general classification for the tour and third in the contest for the sprint ace title.

=== 2005 ===
Bradshaw began 2005 with a 10th placing in the Australian National Road Race Championships at Echunga in South Australia.

Part of the New Zealand 'A' team–alongside Michelle Kiesanowski, Susie Wood, Johanna Buick, Michelle Hyland and Melissa Holt–for the first two rounds of the 2005 UCI Women's Road World Cup, Bradshaw placed 27th in the Australia World Cup and 23th in the New Zealand World Cup.

Bradshaw then travelled to France to train with other New Zealand riders at BikeNZ's training centre at Limoux under the newly appointed road coach Jacques Landry. Racing in the French Cup series in April and May, the New Zealand team, which included Bradshaw, won the teams' classification in two successive rounds. In the 2005 Tour de l'Aude Cycliste Féminin, from 13 to 22 May, Bradshaw was 31st on general classification and 47th on points classification, while the New Zealand team was 13th overall. In June, the New Zealand team was second on teams classification in the five-day Tour Cycliste Féminin de la Drôme, with Bradshaw 12th in the individual general classification. The following month, Bradshaw was sixth on general classification at the Tour de Bretagne Féminin, with a best stage finish of seventh on the fourth and final stage of the race.

In September, Bradshaw competed in the women's elite road race at the 2005 UCI Road World Championships in Madrid, finishing 70th.

Back in New Zealand, Bradshaw was 14th in both the national road race and national time-trial championships in October, before representing New Zealand at the Oceania Road Cycling Championships, held in Whanganui in December, where she won a bronze medal in the women's elite road race.

=== 2006 ===
In January 2005, Bradshaw competed in the Australian National Road Race Championships at Mount Torrens in South Australia, placing 24th. She followed that up finishing 27th in the Geelong Tour.

Bradshaw then competed in the opening two rounds of the 2006 UCI Women's Road World Cup, finishing 46th at Geelong and 17th in the New Zealand leg in Wellington. Between the two World Cup rounds, she raced in the four-day Women's Tour of New Zealand, finishing 17th on general classification and achieving a 15th placing on the final stage, an individual time trial around the Miramar Peninsula.

Im March, Bradshaw was one of six New Zealand representatives in the women's road race at the 2006 Commonwealth Games in Melbourne. Part of a five-woman breakaway on lap two of the nine-lap race, Bradshaw was in contention for a medal. On lap seven, she attacked but the eventual gold medallist, Australia's Natalie Bates counter-attacked and broke clear in a decisive move. Following team orders, Bradshaw then sat up and she and the remaining three riders in the leading group were caught by the peloton. Bradshaw eventually finished 16th, one place ahead of Sarah Ulmer who had been regarded as New Zealand's best chance of a medal in the event.

Bradshaw raced for Les Pruneaux d'Agen in the 2006 Tour de l'Aude Cycliste Féminin in May, finishing 25th on general classification, while her team was 11th overall. She rode for Les Pruneaux d'Agen again in the Grande Boucle Féminine Internationale at the end of June, finishing no worse than 11th on all stages of the tour, including a fifth-place finish in the opening stage, an individual time trial, and ranking 7th on general classification, 8th on points classification and 9th in the mountains classification.

In September, Bradshaw placed 82nd in the women's elite road race at the 2006 UCI Road World Championships.

=== 2007 ===
In 2007, Bradshaw finished 3rd overall at the Tour de Bretagne Féminin, as well as 3rd and 5th on individual stages. At the 2006 UCI Road World Championships in Stuttgart, she was involved in an early crash and did not finish.

=== 2010 ===
Bradshaw placed 70th at the 2010 UCI Road World Championships in Melbourne.

=== Major results ===
1999

- 4th, New Zealand National Time Trial Championships – time trial
- 7th, New Zealand National Road Race Championships – road race

2001

- 7th, New Zealand National Time Trial Championships – time trial
- 6th, New Zealand National Road Race Championships – road race

2003

- 8th, New Zealand National Time Trial Championships – time trial
- 8th, New Zealand National Road Race Championships – road race

2004

- 3rd, stage 3, Tour Cycliste Féminin de la Drôme
- 7th, New Zealand National Time Trial Championships – time trial
- 6th, New Zealand National Road Race Championships – road race

2005

- 10th, Australian National Road Race Championships – road race
- 19th, Women's Tour of New Zealand – general classification
  - 7th, stage 1
  - 6th, stage 2
  - 6th, stage 3
- 12th, Tour Cycliste Féminin de la Drôme – general classification
  - 2nd, stage 3
  - 10th, stage 6
- 6th, Tour de Bretagne Féminin – general classification
  - 9th, stage 1
  - 7th, stage 4
- 3rd, Oceania Road Cycling Championships – road race

2006

- 17th, Women's Tour of New Zealand – general classification
  - 9th, stage 1
  - 6th, stage 2
- 7th, Grande Boucle Féminine Internationale – general classification
  - 5th, stage 1
  - 6th, stage 3
  - 7th, stage 4
  - 7th, stage 5
  - 9th, mountains classification
  - 8th, points classification
- 9th, Tour de Bretagne Féminin – general classification
  - 6th, stage 1

2007

- 7th, New Zealand National Time Trial Championships – time trial
- 9th, New Zealand National Road Race Championships – road race
- 10th, points classification, Women's Tour of New Zealand
- 8th, stage 5, Tour of Prince Edward Island
- 3rd, Tour de Bretagne Féminin – general classification
  - 3rd, stage 1
  - 5th, stage 5
  - 10th, Points classification

2008

- 7th, New Zealand National Road Race Championships – road race

2009

- 10th, New Zealand National Time Trial Championships – time trial

2010

- 8th, New Zealand National Road Race Championships – road race

=== Grand Tour results ===
Race	2004	2005	2006	2007	2008
Grande Boucle Féminine	—	—	7th	—	29th
Route de France Féminine	Not held		27th	DNF	—
Tour de l'Aude Cycliste Féminin	—	31st	25th	19th	65th
Giro d'Italia Femminile	69th	—	—	—	—

=== Coaching and sports leadership ===
Bradshaw retired from professional cycling in 2010, and she has subsequently coached the St Cuthbert's College cycling team in Auckland.

In 2024, Bradshaw was among a group of former New Zealand Olympic, Paralympic and Commonwealth Games competitors that graduated from the Wāhine Toa Leadership Programme, designed to develop female leadership in sport, run by the New Zealand Olympic Committee.

== Physiotherapy career ==
After graduating from Otago at the end of 1997, Bradshaw moved to Timaru, where she gained experience working with physiotherapist Paul Annear. In 1999, she worked with the South Canterbury Colts rugby union team, and in September that year she was the physiotherapist for the New Zealand junior cycling team during the Tour de Hokkaido in Japan. She joined Ponsonby Physiotherapy in Auckland while still actively competing as a road cyclist, and later became an owner of the practice.
