= 2008 Team High Road Women season =

American women's professional cycling team

High Road Women 2008
- UCI code: TMP
- Status: UCI Women's Team Cycling
- Manager: Bob Stapleton

The 2008 Team High Road Women season, now Columbia Women, was the first for the professional women's road cycling structure under this name. However, the team's organization and riders are identical to those of the T-Mobile team, which had been in existence since 2002. T-Mobile decided to end its sponsorship following the numerous doping cases linked to the men's team. Team manager Bob Stapleton decided to continue running the men's and women's teams without a main partner, as the former sponsor's termination fee was substantial. In June, sports equipment manufacturer Columbia Sportswear Company signed a partnership agreement for the period from July 2008 to the end of 2010.

The 2008 season was particularly prolific: the team won fifty UCI races, including the Route de France, and four World Cup rounds, including the Tour of Flanders, which gave Judith Arndt and the team victory in this competition. The year ends in first place in the UCI team rankings. In the individual rankings, Judith Arndt finished second and Ina-Yoko Teutenberg third.

== Preparing for the season ==
=== Partners and team financing ===
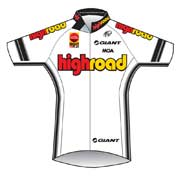
High Road team jersey

In November 2007, T-mobile announced that it was ending its sponsorship of the cycling team in the wake of the doping scandal. However, it compensated the team for this breach of contract, and the team had enough money to continue for two years.

Bob Stapleton decided to maintain the team, which took the American flag and the name of the structure: High Road. Its headquarters moved from Bonn in Germany to San Luis Obispo in California. He introduced a strict anti-doping system.

In June, Bob Stapleton announces that the team has signed a sponsorship contract with Columbia Sportswear Company. The team bears the Columbia name from the men's Tour de France onwards.

=== Arrivals and departures ===
After two years of change, the team finds some stability in 2008. Three riders join the team, including two from the Flexpoint team: German champion Luise Keller and Madeleine Sandig. U.S. champion Mara Abbott, coming off an exceptional first season, also joins from Webcor Builders.

The only person leaving the team was Suzanne de Goede, who joined Equipe Nürnberger Versicherung. She had an excellent season there, finishing second in the World Cup.

| Arrival | 2007 Team |
|---|---|
| Mara Abbott | Webcor Buildsers |
| Luise Keller | Team Flexpoint |
| Madeleine Sandig | Team Flexpoint |

| Departure | 2008 Team |
|---|---|
| Suzanne de Goede | Equipe Nürnberger Versicherung |

== Riders and technical staff ==
=== Staff ===
List of team riders for the 2008 season

| Racer | Date of birth | Nationality | 2007 Team |
|---|---|---|---|
| Mara Abbott | November 14, 1985 | United States | Webcor |
| Kimberly Anderson | January 28, 1968 | United States | T-Mobile |
| Judith Arndt | July 23, 1976 | Germany | T-Mobile |
| Katherine Bates | May 18, 1982 | Australia | T-Mobile |
| Chantal Beltman | August 25, 1976 | Netherlands | T-Mobile |
| Emilia Fahlin | Octobre 24, 1988 | Sweden | T-Mobile |
| Luise Keller | March 8, 1984 | Germany | Team Flexpoint |
| Alexis Rhodes | December 1, 1984 | Australia | T-Mobile |
| Madeleine Sandig | August 12, 1983 | Germany | Team Flexpoint |
| Ina-Yoko Teutenberg | October 28, 1974 | Germany | T-Mobile |
| Linda Villumsen | Abril 9, 1985 | Denmark | T-Mobile |
| Anke Wichmann | August 28, 1975 | Germany | T-Mobile |
| Oenone Wood | September 24, 1980 | Australia | T-Mobile |

=== Team management ===
Ronny Lauke takes over as team manager from Anna Wilson. As in previous years, the team manager for both the men's and women's teams is Bob Stapleton. The coach and media manager is Petra Rossner. The trainer is Arkadiusz Wojtas.

== Season progress ==
=== January–February: start of season ===
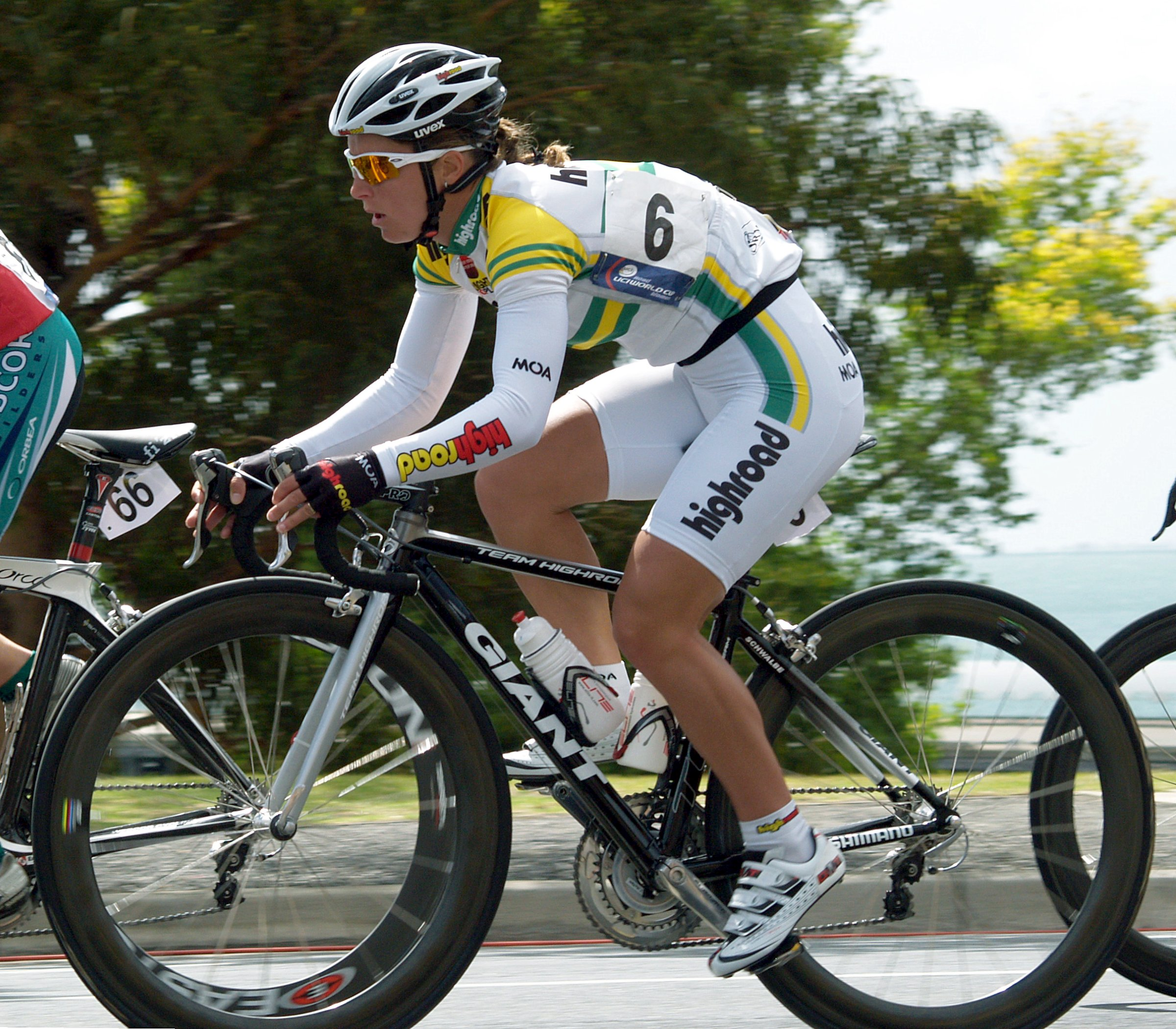
Oenone Wood with her Australian champion's jersey during the Geelong World Cup

In January, Alexis Rhodes wins the first stage of the Jayco Bay Cycling Classic. Oenone Wood wins the Australian National Road Cycling Championship ahead of Sharon Laws, with whom she is seconded.

The team's season kicks off with the Geelong Tour. Ina-Yoko Teutenberg is third in the inaugural time trial. Oenone Wood raises her arms in the first race ahead of the German. The latter was the fastest on the final stage, taking second place in the final overall classification, while Oenone Wood came fourth. On the eponymous World Cup event, despite the team's hard work, the peloton failed to catch up with the breakaway formed by Katheryn Mattis and Emma Rickards. Ina-Yoko Teutenberg won the sprint and finished third. The Tour of New Zealand takes place immediately afterwards. On the first stage, Oenone Wood took second place. She then won the second stage before finishing third on the following stage. She won the fourth stage. On the fifth stage time trial, she was third, twelve seconds behind Kristin Armstrong, who was leading the race. On the final stage, Ina-Yoko Teutenberg won. In the final overall classification, Oenone Wood was second, Judith Arndt fourth.

=== March–April: Classics ===
At the Trofeo Alfredo Binda-Comune di Cittiglio, the presumably strong team fails to organize the chase behind Emma Pooley, who wins solo. Oenone Wood finished fifth. At the end of March, Mara Abbott won the uphill time trial on the first stage of the San Dimas Stage Race, forty-six seconds ahead of her pursuer. A few days later, she wins the prologue of the Redlands Bicycle Classic, with Kim Anderson third. Emilia Fahlin wins the third stage in a sprint. In the final stage, Alexandra Wrubleski wins and takes overall victory. Kim Anderson is third. Mara Abbott finishes second overall, Kim Anderson fourth.

In April, at the Tour of Flanders, the team proved to be very strong collectively, and was in full force in the group of fifteen riders who broke away mid-race. On the Grammont wall, Judith Arndt and Oenone Wood set off with three other riders. On the Bosberg, Judith Arndt is the only one to follow Kristin Armstrong's attack, beating her in a sprint. Oenone Wood also took fourth place. Four days later, Ina-Yoko Teutenberg won the sprint at the Drentse 8 van Dwingeloo. At the Tour de Drenthe, Chantal Beltmann took part in a breakaway with Sarah Düster and Elodie Touffet. When, with five kilometers to go, the peloton came back to within twenty seconds, the frontrunner accelerated decisively. Ina-Yoko Teutenberg takes third place, ahead of Marianne Vos in the sprint22. At the Flèche wallonne, Judith Arndt attacks at the start of the climb up the Mur de Huy, but is caught by Marianne Vos, who passes her, as does Marta Bastianelli. The German thus came third. At the end of the month, Ina-Yoko Teutenberg came second in the Borsele circuit, beaten by Kirsten Wild.

=== May: Tour de l'Aude ===
At the Gracia Orlova, Mara Abbott takes third place in the first stage. Luise Keller is second in the following stage. Ina-Yoko Teutenberg finishes second in the third time-trial stage before winning the fourth stage ahead of Adrie Visser, with both riders a minute ahead of the third. Emilia Fahlin was third in the final stage. In the final classification, Luise Keller took second place on the podium. At the same time at the Tour de Berne, Judith Arndt won the pursuit group sprint behind Susanne Ljungskog. To her great surprise, she also took the lead in the World Cup standings. Chantal Beltman was fourth.

The first major tour of the season, the women's Tour de l'Aude, gets underway in mid-May. Judith Arndt finishes fourth in the first stage after following Susanne Ljungskog's attack down the slope with two kilometers to go. The team is second in the team time trial on stage 2 behind the Dutch national team. However, this allowed Judith Arndt to take the overall lead. On the queen stage, however, she lost more than four minutes to Susanne Ljungskog and her jersey in the process. The following day, Ina-Yoko Teutenberg broke away alone over the second pass, then shortly afterwards with Charlotte Becker. The gap to the peloton narrowed to just ten seconds at the flamme rouge. The two Germans maintained their lead, however, and Ina-Yoko Teutenberg took the win. Judith Arndt also becomes leader of the mountain ranking. Ina-Yoko Teutenberg sprinted again on stage eight. She also takes the lead in the points classification. Judith Arndt wins the last stage of the tour, run in the rain, by winning the sprint of a royal breakaway with the first four overall. Judith Arndt finishes second overall and wins the mountain classification. Roony Lauke is satisfied with the Tour.

=== June: Montreal and national championships ===
On the last day of May, the Coupe du Monde Cycliste Féminine de Montréal gives the team a chance to shine. Ina-Yoko Teutenberg attacks solo on the third lap and manages to stay away from the peloton for five laps. After the regrouping, Judith Arndt breaks away with four other riders. On the final climb, she outdistanced all the others except Fabiana Luperini, whom she beat in a sprint. The Tour of Greater Montreal gets underway immediately afterwards. On the first stage, Oenone Wood came second in the sprint. On the following stage, Judith Arndt broke away with three other competitors, then went the distance to win. The third stage was a short time trial, also won by Judith Arndt, who also took the overall lead. On stage four, Oenone Wood was again second in the final sprint, while Arndt lost her leader's jersey to Suzanne De Goede. On the final stage, Arndt accelerated on the last climb and managed to outrun de Goede, raising her arms in the process. She went on to win the tour as well as three stages. Also in North America, Chantal Beltman won the Liberty Classic solo, attacking on Lemon Hill with three kilometers to go. Ina-Yoko Teutenberg took third place.

The Ster Zeeuwsche Eilanden allowed Ina-Yoko Teutenberg to show off her speed on the second and third stages. Thanks to bonuses, she also won the overall classification. At the Giro del Trentino Alto Adige-Südtirol, Judith Arndt finished fourth, sixth and second respectively on the three stages, while Mara Abbott finished second on stage two. Abbott finished second overall, with Arndt third.

In the national championships, Luise Keller successfully defends her title in the German road race. Emilia Fahlin wins the road title in Sweden. On a difficult course, she took part in a good breakaway with Emma Johansson and Susanne Ljungskog. She fell behind on the two climbs, but managed to catch up on the flat. With two kilometers to go, she launched a decisive attack, taking advantage of the misunderstanding between the other two competitors. In the German time trial, Judith Arndt was beaten by Hanka Kupfernagel. In Denmark, Linda Villumsen won the time trial by more than two minutes over the runner-up and the road race.

=== July: Tour of Italy and Tour of Thuringia ===
The Giro d'Italia kicks off on July 5 with a prologue. Ina-Yoko Teutenberg wins the sprint the next day and takes the leader's jersey. She also won the next two stages. The fourth stage was very selective and cost the team time. In the time trial on stage five, Linda Villumsen came fourth42. On the final stage, Ina-Yoko Teutenberg won again. In the final overall classification, Arndt is the team leader in tenth place.

At the same time, Mara Abbott won the first stage of the Tour de Feminin - Krásná Lípa. In 2008, the Tour of Thuringia was seen as the ultimate preparation for the Olympic Games. On the third stage, Judith Arndt finished sixth and third overall. The following day, she broke away with Trixi Worrack and Grete Treier, only to come back and overtake another breakaway. She took second place in the three-way sprint behind Grete Treier, who was also ahead of her in the overall classification. The time trial on stage five, in which Judith Arndt came third, enabled her to take the overall lead. On the final stage, Trixi Worrack went all out to win the overall classification, beating Judith Arndt in a sprint. However, this was not enough to dethrone her, and Judith Arndt went on to win the Tour of Thuringia for the second year running.

The Open de Suède Vårgårda takes place in the last days of July. In the road race, Kim Anderson breaks away with five other riders with four laps to go out of a field of twelve. With two laps to go, she broke away from the group with Kori Seehafer, who beat her in a sprint. In the team time trial, Team Columbia is second behind Cervélo Lifeforce.

=== August: Olympic Games and Route de France ===
At the Olympic Games, Linda Villumsen, Oenone Wood and Judith Arndt are selected by their respective countries for the time trial. Katherine Bates and Chantal Beltman were also selected for the road race. In the road race, with thirteen kilometers to go, Linda Villumsen followed Tatiana Guderzo's attack and found herself in the leading group with Nicole Cooke, Christiane Soeder and Emma Johansson. At the finish, she finished fifth. In the time trial, Judith Arndt was sixth in the German colors. Villumsen was thirteenth.

The Route de France is held at the same time. Ina-Yoko Teutenberg wins the prologue. She did it again the following day in the bunch sprint. In the second stage, a group of twenty-one riders took a lead of more than five minutes over the second peloton. In the final, Anke Wichmann and Martina Corazza break away. The latter beat Wichmann in a sprint. The third stage is the queen stage. Luise Keller attacks on the second climb of the day and joins the early breakaway. She attacked again with four kilometers to go to take the overall lead. Stage 5 saw Ina-Yoko Teutenberg beat Kim Anderson in the sprint of the ten-strong breakaway group. Luise Keller won the time-trial stage to consolidate her position as overall leader. The final stage remained unchanged, with Kim Anderson taking seventh.

At the Grand Prix de Plouay, the team adopted an offensive strategy: Kimberly Anderson and Chantal Beltman attacked at the start of the race, followed by Anke Wichmann shortly afterwards. On the fourth lap, Luise Keller broke away with Fabiana Luperini. On the final climb, Luise Keller tried to outrun the Italian, but to no avail. The German launched the sprint, but the Italian reeled her in and took the win. Judith Arndt is fourth.

=== September: Profile Ladies Tour and World Championships ===
In the Profile Ladies Tour, the first stage ends in a sprint, with Ina-Yoko Teutenberg the fastest. The second stage was a time trial in which Judith Arndt finished third. In the third stage, Anke Wichmann set off with five other riders in a breakaway. With ten kilometers to go, she attacked and was followed by Sarah Düster, whom she beat in a sprint. Ina-Yoko Teutenberg won the fourth stage in the final pack in the rain. On the final, very hilly stage, after Anke Wichmann had scouted, Ina-Yoko Teutenberg went off in a breakaway at mid-race with Marianne Vos, Irene van den Broek, Trixi Worrack and Regina Bruins. However, the breakaway was caught again on the penultimate lap. Ina-Yoko Teutenberg then set off on her own and quickly opened up a gap. She won at the top of the Geulhemmerberg, followed by Marianne Vos. In the overall classification, she is second behind Charlotte Becker.

On September 14, at the Tour de Nuremberg, Judith Arndt attacked with fourteen kilometers to go in a group of eighteen runners. She won the race solo. At the Michela Fanini Memorial Tour of Tuscany for women, the team wins the team time trial. Judith Arndt is third in the second stage and takes the leader's jersey. Ina-Yoko Teutenberg wins the second stage in sector b. Mara Abbott wins the third stage. The following day, Ina-Yoko Teutenberg wins again. Judith Arndt wins the fifth stage. Finally, she adds her name to the list of winners, the team winning five of the seven stages.

At the World Championships, Judith Arndt, Linda Villumsen and Alexis Rhodes are on the start list for the time trial. Judith Arndt takes the bronze medal. She said she was satisfied with her place, as her preparation had been more focused on the road race than on the time trial. Chantal Beltman, Luise Keller, Emilia Fahlin and Oenone Wood also took the start in the road race. Judith Arndt was one of five runners to break away in the final. She finishes third in the sprint. Chantal Beltman is twelfth.

== Season review ==
Each of the team's female racers won at least one race. Ina-Yoko Teutenberg alone won twenty-four. Judith Arndt had an extraordinary season, winning the World Cup and finishing second in the UCI rankings, just a few points behind Marianne Vos.

The team won a total of sixty-eight races, including fifty UCI road victories, putting it well ahead of DSB Bank Ladies Cycling-Team with twenty-eight UCI road victories.

In March, Alfred North named the team "Team of the Month". The following year, Anderson declared that in 2008 "everyone had a good season". Velonews magazine named the High Road women's cycling team of the year.

=== Victories ===
Main results 2008

| Date | Race | Country | Category | Winner |
|---|---|---|---|---|
| January 12 | Australian National Road Cycling Championships | Australia | CN | Oenone Wood |
| February 21 | 2nd stage of the Geelong Tour | Australia | 2.2 | Oenone Wood |
| February 22 | 3rd stage of the Geelong Tour | Australia | 2.2 | Ina-Yoko Teutenberg |
| February 28 | 2nd stage of the Women's Tour of New Zealand | New Zealand | 2.2 | Oenone Wood |
| February 28 | 2nd stage of the Women's Tour of New Zealand | New Zealand | 2.2 | Oenone Wood |
| March 1 | 4th stage of the Women's Tour of New Zealand | New Zealand | 2.2 | Oenone Wood |
| March 2 | 6th stage of the Women's Tour of New Zealand | New Zealand | 2.2 | Ina-Yoko Teutenberg |
| Abril 6 | Tour of Flanders for Women | Belgium | CDM | Judith Arndt |
| Abril 10 | Drentse 8 van Dwingeloo | Belgium | 1.1 | Ina-Yoko Teutenberg |
| Abril 12 | Ronde van Drenthe | Netherlands | CDM | Chantal Beltman |
| May 3 | 4th stage of the Gracia-Orlová | Czech Republic | 2.2 | Ina-Yoko Teutenberg |
| May 21 | 5th stage of the Tour de l'Aude Cycliste Féminin | France | 2.1 | Ina-Yoko Teutenberg |
| May 24 | 8th stage of the Tour de l'Aude Cycliste Féminin | France | 2.1 | Ina-Yoko Teutenberg |
| May 25 | 9th stage of the Tour de l'Aude Cycliste Féminin | France | 2.1 | Judith Arndt |
| May 31 | Coupe du Monde Cycliste Féminine de Montréal | Canada | CDM | Judith Arndt |
| June 3 | 2nd stage of the Tour du Grand Montréal | Canada | 2.1 | Judith Arndt |
| June 4 | 3rd stage of the Tour du Grand Montréal | Canada | 2.1 | Judith Arndt |
| June 5 | 5th stage of the Tour du Grand Montréal | Canada | 2.1 | Judith Arndt |
| June 5 | Tour du Grand Montréal | Canada | 2.1 | Judith Arndt |
| June 8 | Liberty Classic | United States | 1.1 | Chantal Beltman |
| June 20 | 2nd stage of the Ster Zeeuwsche Eilanden | Netherlands | 2.2 | Ina-Yoko Teutenberg |
| June 21 | 3rd stage of the Ster Zeeuwsche Eilanden | Netherlands | 2.2 | Ina-Yoko Teutenberg |
| June 21 | Ster Zeeuwsche Eilanden | Netherlands | 2.2 | Ina-Yoko Teutenberg |
| June 26 | Danish National Road Race Championships | Denmark | CN | Linda Villumsen |
| June 28 | Danish Road Championship | Denmark | CN | Linda Villumsen |
| June 28 | Swedish National Road Race Championships | Sweden | CN | Emilia Fahlin |
| June 29 | German National Road Race Championships | Germany | CN | Luise Keller |
| July 5 | 1st stage of the Giro d'Italia Women | Italy | 2.1 | Ina-Yoko Teutenberg |
| July 6 | 2nd stage of the Giro d'Italia Women | Italy | 2.1 | Ina-Yoko Teutenberg |
| July 7 | 3rd stage of the Giro d'Italia Women | Italy | 2.1 | Ina-Yoko Teutenberg |
| July 13 | 8th stage of the Giro d'Italia Women | Italy | 2.1 | Ina-Yoko Teutenberg |
| July 10 | 1st stage of the Tour de Feminin – O cenu Českého Švýcarska | Czech Republic | 2.2 | Mara Abbott |
| July 27 | Thüringen Ladies Tour | Germany | 2.1 | Judith Arndt |
| August 10 | Prologue of the Women's Route de France | France | 2.1 | Ina-Yoko Teutenberg |
| August 11 | 1st stage of the Women's Route de France | France | 2.1 | Ina-Yoko Teutenberg |
| August 13 | 3rd stage of the Women's Route de France | France | 2.1 | Luise Keller |
| August 15 | 5th stage of the Women's Route de France | France | 2.1 | Ina-Yoko Teutenberg |
| August 16 | 6th stage of the Women's Route de France | France | 2.1 | Luise Keller |
| August 17 | Women's Route de France | France | 2.1 | Luise Keller |
| September 2 | 1st stage of the Holland Ladies Tour | Netherlands | 2.2 | Ina-Yoko Teutenberg |
| September 4 | 3rd stage of the Holland Ladies Tour | Netherlands | 2.2 | Anke Wichmann |
| September 5 | 4th stage of the Holland Ladies Tour | Netherlands | 2.2 | Ina-Yoko Teutenberg |
| September 7 | 6th stage of the Holland Ladies Tour | Netherlands | 2.2 | Ina-Yoko Teutenberg |
| September 14 | Tour of Old Town Nuremberg | Germany | CDM | Judith Arndt |
| September 16 | 1st stage of the Giro della Toscana Int. Femminile – Memorial Michela Fanini | Italy | 2.1 | Columbia Women |
| September 17 | 2nd stage of the Giro della Toscana Int. Femminile – Memorial Michela Fanini | Italy | 2.1 | Ina-Yoko Teutenberg |
| September 18 | 3rd stage of the Giro della Toscana Int. Femminile – Memorial Michela Fanini | Italy | 2.1 | Mara Abbott |
| September 19 | 4th stage of the Giro della Toscana Int. Femminile – Memorial Michela Fanini | Italy | 2.1 | Ina-Yoko Teutenberg |
| September 20 | 5th stage of the Giro della Toscana Int. Femminile – Memorial Michela Fanini | Italy | 2.1 | Judith Arndt |
| September 21 | Giro della Toscana Int. Femminile – Memorial Michela Fanini | Italy | 2.1 | Judith Arndt |

=== Major race results ===
==== World Cup ====
Results in World Cup races

| # | Date | Race | Best Ranked | Ranking |
|---|---|---|---|---|
| February 24, 2008 | 1 | Geelong World Cup | Ina-Yoko Teutenberg | 3rd |
| March 24, 2008 | 2 | Trofeo Alfredo Binda-Comune di Cittiglio | Oenone Wood | 5th |
| Abril 6, 2008 | 3 | Tour des Flandres | Judith Arndt | Winner |
| Abril 12, 2008 | 4 | Tour de Denthre | Chantal Beltman | Winner |
| Abril 23, 2008 | 5 | La Flèche Wallonne Féminine | Judith Arndt | 3rd |
| Abril 4, 2008 | 6 | Tour de Berne | Judith Arndt | 2nd |
| May 31, 2008 | 7 | Women's Cycling World Cup of Montreal | Judith Arndt | Winner |
| July 30, 2008 | 8 | Open de Suède Vårgårda | Kim Anderson | 2nd |
| August 1, 2008 | 9 | Open de Suède Vårgårda TTT | Team Columbia Women | 2nd |
| August 24, 2008 | 10 | Classic Lorient Agglomération | Luise Keller | 2nd |
| September 14, 2008 | 11 | Tour of Old Town Nuremberg | Judith Arndt | Winner |

Judith Arndt won the final ranking with 365 points, Chantal Beltman came sixth with 114 points and Ina-Yoko Teutenberg tenth with 100 points. The team also won the final ranking with 852 points, compared with 498 for the runner-up, the Nürnberger Versicherung team.

=== Grand tours ===
| Grand tour | Giro d'Italia Women | Tour de l'Aude | Tour de France Femmes | Route de France |
|---|---|---|---|---|
| Racer (ranking) | Judith Arndt (10th) | Judith Arndt (2nd) | - | Luise Keller (1st) |
| Accessits | 4 stage wins | 3 stage wins | - | 4 stage wins and prologue victory |

=== UCI rankings ===
UCI ranking of team riders

| Rank | Racer | Points |
|---|---|---|
| 2 | Judith Arndt | 1206.66 |
| 3 | Ina-Yoko Teutenberg | 616.16 |
| 17 | Luise Keller | 357.16 |
| 20 | Chantal Beltman | 291 |
| 23 | Oenone Wood | 246 |
| 26 | Linda Villumsen | 242.16 |
| 46 | Kim Anderson | 136 |
| 47 | Mara Abbott | 130 |
| 98 | Emilia Fahlin | 54 |
| 124 | Anke Wichmann | 38 |
| 126 | Alex Rhodes | 36.16 |
| 134 | Katherine Bates | 32 |

The team is first in the UCI rankings. Judith Arndt is beaten by Marianne Vos for first place by just twenty points. With the exception of Madeleine Sandig, all riders are ranked.

== Bibliography ==
- North, Alfred (2009). Tour le cyclisme féminin performances 2008.
