= 2001 UCI Women's Road World Cup =

Series of bicycle races

- Fourth edition of the UCI Women's Road World Cup

Details
- Dates: 10 March – 15 September
- Location: Europe, North America and Oceania
- Races: 9

Champions
- Individual champion: Anna Millward (AUS) (Saturn Cycling Team)

The 2001 UCI Women's Road World Cup was the fourth edition of the UCI Women's Road World Cup. It was contested over nine rounds as the calendar saw a return of the Trophée International and the New Zealand World Cup rounds. The series was won for a second time by Anna Millward, who won the competition in 1999.

== Races ==
Date	Event	Country	Winner
10 March	Australia World Cup, Canberra	Australia	Anna Millward (AUS)
18 March	New Zealand World Cup, Hamilton City	New Zealand	Anna Millward (AUS)
24 March	Primavera Rosa	Italy	Susanne Ljungskog (SWE)
18 April	La Flèche Wallonne Féminine	Belgium	Fabiana Luperini (ITA)
3 June	Coupe du Monde Cycliste Féminine de Montréal	Canada	Geneviève Jeanson (CAN)
10 June	Liberty Classic	United States	Petra Rossner (GER)
3 August	Trophée International	France	Olga Slyusareva (RUS)
8 September	GP Suisse Féminin	Switzerland	Susanne Ljungskog (SWE)
15 September	Rotterdam Tour	Netherlands	Judith Arndt (GER)

== Final classification ==
#	Cyclist	Points
1	Anna Millward (AUS)	324
2	Mirjam Melchers (NED)	285
3	Susanne Ljungskog (SWE)	240
4	Fabiana Luperini (ITA)	136
5	Debby Mansveld (NED)	112
6	Heidi van de Vijver (BEL)	101
7	Zinaida Stahurskaia (BLR)	91
8	Petra Rossner (GER)	86
9	Judith Arndt (GER)	85
10	Edita Pučinskaitė (LTU)	80
