= 2003 UCI Women's Road World Cup =

Series of bicycle races

- Sixth edition of the UCI Women's Road World Cup

Details
- Dates: 2 March – 7 September
- Location: Australia, Canada and Europe
- Races: 9

Champions
- Individual champion: Nicole Cooke (GBR) (Ausra Gruodis Safi)

The 2003 UCI Women's Road World Cup was the sixth edition of the UCI Women's Road World Cup. There were again nine rounds, but compared to 2002 there were two changes as the GP Suisse Féminin and New Zealand World Cup were replaced by the Amstel Gold Race and the Rund um die Nürnberger Altstadt. Welsh rider Nicole Cooke won her first overall title.

== Races ==
Date	Event	Country	Winner
2 March	Australia World Cup, Sydney	Australia	Sara Carrigan (AUS)
22 March	Primavera Rosa	Italy	Zulfiya Zabirova (RUS)
30 March	GP Castilla y León	Spain	Mirjam Melchers (NED)
20 April	Amstel Gold Race	Netherlands	Nicole Cooke (GBR)
23 April	La Flèche Wallonne Féminine	Belgium	Nicole Cooke (GBR)
31 May	Coupe du Monde Cycliste Féminine de Montréal	Canada	Geneviève Jeanson (CAN)
23 August	GP de Plouay	France	Nicole Cooke (GBR)
31 August	Rund um die Nürnberger Altstadt	Germany	Diana Žiliūtė (LIT)
7 September	Rotterdam Tour	Netherlands	Chantal Beltman (NED)

== Final classification ==
#	Cyclist	Points
1	Nicole Cooke (GBR)	309
2	Regina Schleicher (GER)	211
3	Mirjam Melchers (NED)	198
4	Sara Carrigan (AUS)	177
5	Judith Arndt (GER)	157
6	Diana Žiliūtė (LTU)	146
7	Anita Valen (NOR)	145
8	Rochelle Gilmore (AUS)	119
9	Susanne Ljungskog (SWE)	97
10	Zulfiya Zabirova (KAZ)	94
