= 2005 UCI Women's Road World Cup =

Series of bicycle races

- Eighth edition of the UCI Women's Road World Cup

Details
- Dates: 27 February – 11 September
- Location: Canada, Europe and Oceania
- Races: 11

Champions
- Individual champion: Oenone Wood (AUS) (Equipe Nürnberger Versicherung)

The 2005 UCI Women's Road World Cup was the eighth edition of the UCI Women's Road World Cup. It was contested over eleven rounds; in addition to the races in 2004, there was the return of the New Zealand World Cup and the GP of Wales. Oenone Wood won her second consecutive overall title.

== Races ==
Date	Event	Country	Winner
27 February	Australia World Cup, Geelong	Australia	Rochelle Gilmore (AUS)
6 March	New Zealand World Cup	New Zealand	Suzanne De Goede (NED)
19 March	Primavera Rosa	Italy	Trixi Worrack (GER)
3 April	Tour of Flanders for Women	Belgium	Mirjam Melchers (NED)
20 April	La Flèche Wallonne Féminine	Belgium	Nicole Cooke (GBR)
8 May	GP Castilla y León	Spain	Susanne Ljungskog (SWE)
28 May	Coupe du Monde Cycliste Féminine de Montréal	Canada	Geneviève Jeanson (CAN)
21 August	GP of Wales	United Kingdom	Judith Arndt (GER)
27 August	GP de Plouay	France	Noemi Cantele (ITA)
4 September	Lowland International Rotterdam Tour	Netherlands	Ina-Yoko Teutenberg (GER)
11 September	Rund um die Nürnberger Altstadt	Germany	Giorgia Bronzini (ITA)

=== Final classification ===
#	Cyclist	Team	Total
1	Oenone Wood (AUS)	Equipe Nürnberger Versicherung	378
2	Susanne Ljungskog (SWE)	Buitenpoort - Flexpoint Team	299
3	Mirjam Melchers (NED)	Buitenpoort - Flexpoint Team	255
4	Giorgia Bronzini (ITA)	Chirio–Forno d'Asolo	185
5	Judith Arndt (GER)	Equipe Nürnberger Versicherung	184
6	Rochelle Gilmore (AUS)	Safi–Pasta Zara–Manhattan	181
7	Suzanne de Goede (NED)	Van Bemmelen–AA Drink	167
8	Ina-Yoko Teutenberg (GER)	T-Mobile Women	129
9	Nicole Cooke (GBR)	Safi–Pasta Zara–Manhattan	125
10	Trixi Worrack (GER)	Equipe Nürnberger Versicherung	99
