= 2004 UCI Women's Road World Cup =

Series of bicycle races

- Seventh edition of the UCI Women's Road World Cup

Details
- Dates: 29 February – 11 September
- Location: Australia, Canada and Europe
- Races: 9

Champions
- Individual champion: Oenone Wood (AUS)

The 2004 UCI Women's Road World Cup was the seventh edition of the UCI Women's Road World Cup. It consisted of seven races. There was a single change from 2003; the discontinued Amstel Gold Race was replaced by the newly created Tour of Flanders for Women. Australian rider Oenone Wood won her first overall title.

== Races ==
Date	Event	Country	Winner
29 February	Australia World Cup, Geelong	Australia	Oenone Wood (AUS)
20 March	Primavera Rosa	Italy	Zulfiya Zabirova (RUS)
28 March	GP Castilla y León	Spain	Angela Brodtka (GER)
4 April	Tour of Flanders for Women	Belgium	Zulfiya Zabirova (RUS)
21 April	La Flèche Wallonne Féminine	Belgium	Sonia Huguet (FRA)
29 May	Coupe du Monde Cycliste Féminine de Montréal	Canada	Geneviève Jeanson (CAN)
29 August	GP de Plouay	France	Edita Pučinskaitė (LIT)
5 September	Lowland International Rotterdam Tour	Netherlands	Petra Rossner (GER)
11 September	Rund um die Nürnberger Altstadt	Germany	Petra Rossner (GER)

== Final classification ==
#	Cyclist	Équipe	1	2	3	4	5	6	7	8	9	Total
1	Oenone Wood (AUS)		75	35	50	18	24	0	35	27	70	334
2	Petra Rossner (GER)	Equipe Nürnberger Versicherung	50	0	18	–	0	0	–	75	150	293
3	Angela Brodtka (GER)	Team Farm Frites–Hartol	–	4	75	0	–	–	–	50	100	229
4	Mirjam Melchers (NED)	Team Farm Frites–Hartol	0	50	35	30	0	–	50	0	30	184
5	Zulfiya Zabirova (KAZ)	Team Let's Go Finland	–	75	0	75	4	–	0	–	0	154
6	Edita Pučinskaitė (LTU)	SC Michela Fanini–Record–Rox	–	0	0	5	35	7	75	–	0	115
7	Alison Wright (AUS)	Nobili Rubinetterie-Guerciotti	30	6	11	24	0	0	15	0	22	108
8	Tanja Schmidt-Hennes (GER)	Team Next 125	11	0	0	0	–	–	–	35	54	100
9	Olivia Gollan (AUS)		4	0	21	0	15	35	18	1	0	94
10	Katia Longhin (ITA)	SC Michela Fanini–Record–Rox	–	15	10	–	0	–	10	8	42	85
