= 1999 UCI Women's Road World Cup =

Series of bicycle races

- Second edition of the UCI Women's Road World Cup

Details
- Dates: 7 March – 26 September
- Location: Europe, North America and Oceania
- Races: 9

Champions
- Individual champion: Anna Wilson (AUS) (Saturn Cycling Team)

The 1999 UCI Women's Road World Cup was the second edition of the UCI Women's Road World Cup. It consisted of nine rounds: in addition to the six rounds in 1998 that were all retained there were the New Zealand World Cup, the Primavera Rosa and La Flèche Wallonne Féminine. Australian rider Anna Wilson of Saturn Cycling Team won the series.

== Races ==
Date	Event	Location	Winner
7 March	Australia World Cup, Canberra	Australia	Anna Wilson (AUS)
14 March	New Zealand World Cup, Hamilton	New Zealand	Roberta Bonanomi (ITA)
20 March	Primavera Rosa	Italy	Sara Felloni (ITA)
14 April	La Flèche Wallonne Féminine	Belgium	Hanka Kupfernagel (GER)
30 May	Coupe du Monde Cycliste Féminine de Montréal	Canada	Tracey Gaudry (AUS)
4 June	Liberty Classic	United States	Petra Rossner (GER)
8 August	Trophée International	France	Vanja Vonckx (BEL)
9 September	Ladies Tour Beneden-Maas	Netherlands	Petra Rossner (GER)
26 September	UCI World Cup Finale Embrach	Switzerland	Anna Wilson (AUS)

== Final classification ==
#	Cyclist	Points
1	Anna Wilson (AUS)	288
2	Hanka Kupfernagel (GER)	281
3	Tracey Gaudry (AUS)	162
4	Petra Rossner (GER)	160
5	Sara Felloni (ITA)	114
6	Roberta Bonanomi (ITA)	113
7	Chantal Beltman (NED)	104
8	Gunn-Rita Dahle (NOR)	95
9	Vanja Vonckx (BEL)	84
10	Catherine Marsal (FRA)	84
