= 2006 UCI Women's Road World Cup =

Series of bicycle races

- Ninth edition of the UCI Women's Road World Cup

Details
- Dates: 26 February – 10 September
- Location: Canada, Europe and Oceania
- Races: 12

Champions
- Individual champion: Nicole Cooke (GBR) (Univega Pro Cycling Team)
- Teams' champion: Univega Pro Cycling Team

The 2006 UCI Women's Road World Cup is the ninth edition of the UCI Women's Road World Cup. Nine of the eleven races from the 2005 World Cup were retained and three new races were added to give a total of twelve races – the most rounds the World Cup had seen. The races that were left off the calendar were the GP of Wales and the Primavera Rosa. The Danish race the L'Heure D'Or Féminine, Sweden's Open de Suède Vårgårda and the Swiss Tour de Berne were the new rounds.

== Races ==
	Date	Race	Country	Winner	Team
#1	26 February	Geelong World Cup	Australia	Ina-Yoko Teutenberg (GER)	Team T-Mobile Women
#2	5 March	New Zealand World Cup	New Zealand	Sarah Ulmer (NZL)	New Zealand
#3	2 April	Tour of Flanders for Women	Belgium	Mirjam Melchers-Van Poppel (NED)	Buitenpoort - Flexpoint Team
#4	19 April	La Flèche Wallonne Féminine	Belgium	Nicole Cooke (GBR)	Univega Pro Cycling Team
#5	23 April	Tour de Berne	Switzerland	Zulfiya Zabirova (KAZ)	Bigla Cycling Team
#6	7 May	GP Castilla y Leon	Spain	Nicole Cooke (GBR)	Univega Pro Cycling Team
#7	27 May	Coupe du Monde Cycliste Féminine de Montréal	Canada	Judith Arndt (GER)	Team T-Mobile Women
#8	28 July	Open de Suède Vårgårda	Sweden	Susanne Ljungskog (SWE)	Buitenpoort - Flexpoint Team
#9	30 July	The Ladies Golden Hour	Denmark	Team time trial	Univega Pro Cycling Team
#10	26 August	GP de Plouay	France	Nicole Brändli (SUI)	Bigla Cycling Team
#11	3 September	Lowland International Rotterdam Tour	Netherlands	Ina-Yoko Teutenberg (GER)	Team T-Mobile Women
#12	10 September	Rund um die Nürnberger Altstadt	Germany	Regina Schleicher (GER)	Equipe Nürnberger Versicherung

== Final standings ==
=== Riders ===
	Rider	Team
1	Nicole Cooke (GBR)	Univega Pro Cycling Team
2	Ina Teutenberg (GER)	Team T-Mobile Women
3	Annette Beutler (SUI)	Buitenpoort - Flexpoint Team
4	Judith Arndt (GER)	Team T-Mobile Women
5	Susanne Ljungskog (SWE)	Buitenpoort - Flexpoint Team
6	Oenone Wood (AUS)	Equipe Nürnberger Versicherung
7	Regina Schleicher (GER)	Equipe Nürnberger Versicherung
8	Trixi Worrack (GER)	Equipe Nürnberger Versicherung
9	Giorgia Bronzini (ITA)	A.S. Team F.R.W
10	Zulfiya Zabirova (KAZ)	Bigla Cycling Team

=== Teams ===
	Team
1	Univega Pro Cycling Team
2	Team T-Mobile Women
3	Buitenpoort - Flexpoint Team
4	Equipe Nürnberger Versicherung
5	Bigla Cycling Team
