= 2002 UCI Women's Road World Cup =

Series of bicycle races

- Fifth edition of the UCI Women's Road World Cup

Details
- Dates: 3 March – 15 September
- Location: Canada, Europe and Oceania
- Races: 9

Champions
- Individual champion: Petra Rossner (GER) (Saturn Cycling Team)

The 2002 UCI Women's Road World Cup was the fifth edition of the UCI Women's Road World Cup. It consisted of nine rounds; compared to 2001, the Liberty Classic and Trophée International were replaced by the GP Castilla y León and the GP de Plouay. German rider Petra Rossner won the series overall.

== Races ==
Date	Event	Country	Winner
3 March	Australia World Cup	Australia	Petra Rossner (GER)
10 March	New Zealand World Cup, Hamilton	New Zealand	Petra Rossner (GER)
23 March	Primavera Rosa	Italy	Mirjam Melchers (NED)
17 April	La Flèche Wallonne Féminine	Belgium	Fabiana Luperini (ITA)
21 April	GP Castilla y León	Spain	Regina Schleicher (GER)
2 June	Coupe du Monde Cycliste Féminine de Montréal	Canada	Dede Barry (USA)
24 August	GP de Plouay	France	Regina Schleicher (GER)
8 September	GP Suisse Féminin	Switzerland	Svetlana Bubnenkova (RUS)
15 September	Rotterdam Tour	Netherlands	Petra Rossner (GER)

== Final classification ==
#	Cyclist	Points
1	Petra Rossner (GER)	345
2	Mirjam Melchers (NED)	283
3	Regina Schleicher (GER)	225
4	Priska Doppmann (SUI)	155
5	Rochelle Gilmore (AUS)	111
6	Susanne Ljungskog (SWE)	99
7	Fabiana Luperini (ITA)	98
8	Hanka Kupfernagel (GER)	92
9	Svetlana Boubnenkova (RUS)	86
10	Simona Parente (ITA)	84
