= 1998 UCI Women's Road World Cup =

Series of bicycle races

- First edition of the UCI Women's Road World Cup

Details
- Dates: 29 March – 27 September
- Location: Australia, Europe and North America
- Races: 6

Champions
- Individual champion: Diana Žiliūtė (LIT)

The 1998 UCI Women's Road World Cup was the inaugural edition of the UCI Women's Road World Cup. It consisted of six rounds in Australia, Europe and North America. The champion was Diana Žiliūtė, who won two rounds and finished with a points tally over double that of her nearest rival.

== Races ==
Date	Event	Country	Winner
29 March	Australia World Cup, Sydney	Australia	Dede Barry (USA)
7 June	Liberty Classic	United States	Petra Rossner (GER)
13 June	Coupe du Monde Cycliste Féminine de Montréal	Canada	Diana Žiliūtė (LIT)
9 August	Trophée International	France	Alessandra Cappellotto (ITA)
13 September	Ladies Tour Beneden-Maas	Netherlands	Diana Žiliūtė (LIT)
27 September	GP William Tell	Switzerland	Zulfiya Zabirova (RUS)

== Final classification ==
#	Cyclist	Points
1	Diana Žiliūtė (LTU)	271
2	Alessandra Cappellotto (ITA)	134
3	Deirdre Demet-Barry (USA)	126
4	Elisabeth Vink (NED)	87
5	Edita Pučinskaitė (LTU)	87
6	Petra Rossner (GER)	84
7	Zulfiya Zabirova (RUS)	75
8	Catherine Marsal (FRA)	75
9	Jeannie Longo (FRA)	63
10	Karen Bliss-Livingston (USA)	59
