= 1999 UCI Road World Championships =

Cycling world championships

- Venue: Treviso and Verona, Italy
- Date: 3–10 October 1999
- Events: 10

Host cities in Veneto

The 1999 UCI Road World Championships took place in Treviso and Verona, Italy, between October 3 and October 10, 1999. The event consisted of a road race and a time trial for men, women, men under 23, junior men and junior women.

== Events summary ==
| Event | Gold | | Silver | | Bronze | |
|---|---|---|---|---|---|---|
Men's Events
| Men's road race | Óscar Freire; Spain | 6h19'29" | Markus Zberg; Switzerland | + 4" | Jean-Cyril Robin; France | s.t. |
| Men's time trial | Jan Ullrich; Germany | 1h28" | Michael Andersson; Sweden | + 14" | Chris Boardman; Great Britain | + 58" |
Women's Events
| Women's road race | Edita Pučinskaitė; Lithuania | 2h59'49" | Anna Wilson; Australia | + 18" | Diana Žiliūtė; Lithuania | s.t. |
| Women's time trial | Leontien Zijlaard-van Moorsel; Netherlands | 32'31" | Anna Wilson; Australia | + 4" | Edita Pučinskaitė; Lithuania | + 31" |
Men's Under-23 Events
| Men's under-23 road race | Leonardo Giordani; Italy | 4h22'36" | Luca Paolini; Italy | + 9" | Matthias Kessler; Germany | s.t. |
| Men's under-23 time trial | José Iván Gutiérrez; Spain | 39'49" | Michael Rogers; Australia | + 1" | Evgeny Petrov; Russia | + 29" |
Men's Junior Events
| Men's Junior Road Race | Damiano Cunego; Italy | 3h14'36" | Ruslan Kayumov; Russia | + 5" | Christophe Kern; France | + 37" |
| Men's Junior Time Trial | Fabian Cancellara; Switzerland | 30'36" | Ruslan Kayumov; Russia | + 42" | Christian Knees; Germany | + 49" |
Women's Junior Events
| Women's Junior Road Race | Genevieve Jeanson; Canada | 1h47'16" | Trixi Worrack; Germany | + 8" | Noemi Cantele; Italy | + 3'33" |
| Women's Junior Time Trial | Geneviève Jeanson; Canada | 14'33" | Juliette Vandekerkove; France | + 11" | Trixi Worrack; Germany | + 23" |
