= UCI Women's Road World Cup =

Women's road cycling series

- Sport: Road bicycle racing
- Founded: 1998
- Folded: 2015
- Replaced by: UCI Women's World Tour (2016)
- No. of teams: See: UCI Women's Teams
- Last champions: Lizzie Armitstead (GBR); Rabobank-Liv Woman Cycling Team
- Website: official website

The UCI Women's Road Cycling World Cup was a season-long road bicycle competition for women organized by the Union Cycliste Internationale between 1998 and 2015. This competition consisted of a series (which has varied from 6 to 12 events) of races linked together, not only by a common designation, but also by a yearly overall points competition.

Each World Cup race was a one-day event, with courses ranging from relatively flat, criterium-like courses, to those which have much climbing, as exemplified by La Flèche Wallonne Féminine which ends on the famed Mur de Huy climb with several sections exceeding 15% grades.

From 2016, the competition was replaced by the UCI Women's World Tour – which includes stage stages as well as one-day events, including many races used in the World Cup.

== Winners ==
=== Individuals ===
Year	Winner	Second	Third
1998	(Lithuania) Diana Žiliūtė	(Italy) Alessandra Cappellotto	(United States) Deirdre Demet-Barry
1999	(Australia) Anna Wilson (Note: Anna Wilson married in 2000 and changed her surname to Milward.)	(Germany) Hanka Kupfernagel	(Australia) Tracey Gaudry
2000	(Lithuania) Diana Žiliūtė	(Finland) Pia Sundstedt	(Netherlands) Mirjam Melchers
2001	(Australia) Anna Millward	(Netherlands) Mirjam Melchers	(Sweden) Susanne Ljungskog
2002	(Germany) Petra Rossner	(Netherlands) Mirjam Melchers	(Germany) Regina Schleicher
2003	(United Kingdom) Nicole Cooke	(Germany) Regina Schleicher	(Netherlands) Mirjam Melchers
2004	(Australia) Oenone Wood	(Germany) Petra Rossner	(Germany) Angela Brodtka
2005	(Australia) Oenone Wood	(Sweden) Susanne Ljungskog	(Netherlands) Mirjam Melchers
2006	(United Kingdom) Nicole Cooke	(Germany) Ina-Yoko Teutenberg	(Switzerland) Annette Beutler
2007	(Netherlands) Marianne Vos	(United Kingdom) Nicole Cooke	(Germany) Ina-Yoko Teutenberg
2008	(Germany) Judith Arndt	(Netherlands) Suzanne de Goede	(Netherlands) Marianne Vos
2009	(Netherlands) Marianne Vos	(Sweden) Emma Johansson	(Netherlands) Kirsten Wild
2010	(Netherlands) Marianne Vos	(Sweden) Emma Johansson	(Netherlands) Kirsten Wild
2011	(Netherlands) Annemiek van Vleuten	(Netherlands) Marianne Vos	(Sweden) Emma Johansson
2012	(Netherlands) Marianne Vos	(Germany) Judith Arndt	(United States) Evelyn Stevens
2013	(Netherlands) Marianne Vos	(Sweden) Emma Johansson	(Netherlands) Ellen van Dijk
2014	(United Kingdom) Lizzie Armitstead	(Sweden) Emma Johansson	(Netherlands) Marianne Vos
2015	(United Kingdom) Lizzie Armitstead	(Netherlands) Anna Van Der Breggen	(Belgium) Jolien D'Hoore

=== Teams ===
A teams classification was added in 2006.

Season	Team
2006	Univega Pro Cycling Team
2007	Raleigh–Lifeforce–Creation HB Pro Cycling Team
2008	Team Columbia Women
2009	Cervélo TestTeam
2010	Cervélo TestTeam
2011	Nederland bloeit
2012	Rabobank Women Team
2013	Rabobank-Liv Giant
2014	Rabobank-Liv Woman Cycling Team
2015	Rabobank-Liv Woman Cycling Team

== Races ==
Click on the blue dots for the corresponding page.

Race	Country	98	99	00	01	02	03	04	05	06	07	08	09	10	11	12	13	14	15	Total
Australia World Cup (Note: Referred to as World Cup Sydney in 1998, World Cup Canberra from 1999 to 2001 and Geelong World Cup from 2004 and 2008.)	Australia	•	•	•	•	•	•	•	•	•	•	•								11
Liberty Classic	United States	•	•	•	•															4
Coupe du Monde Cycliste Féminine de Montréal	Canada	•	•	•	•	•	•	•	•	•	•	•	•							12
Trophée International	France	•	•		•															3
Ladies Tour Beneden-Maas	Netherlands	•	•																	2
GP Suisse Féminin (Note: Referred to as GP William Tell in 1998 and UCI World Cup Finale Embrach in 1999 and 2000.)	Switzerland	•	•	•	•	•														5
New Zealand World Cup (Note: Referred to as World Cup Hamilton City in 1999, 2001 and 2002.)	New Zealand		•		•	•			•	•										5
Primavera Rosa	Italy		•	•	•	•	•	•	•											7
La Flèche Wallonne Féminine	Belgium		•	•	•	•	•	•	•	•	•	•	•	•	•	•	•	•	•	17
Lowland International Rotterdam Tour	Netherlands			•	•	•	•	•	•	•										7
GP Castilla y León	Spain					•	•	•	•	•										5
GP de Plouay	France					•	•	•	•	•	•	•	•	•	•	•	•	•	•	14
Amstel Gold Race	Netherlands						•													1
Rund um die Nürnberger Altstadt	Germany						•	•	•	•	•	•	•							7
Tour of Flanders for Women	Belgium							•	•	•	•	•	•	•	•	•	•	•	•	12
GP of Wales	United Kingdom								•											1
Tour de Berne	Switzerland									•	•	•	•							4
Open de Suède Vårgårda	Sweden									•	•	•	•	•	•	•	•	•	•	10
The Ladies Golden Hour	Denmark									•										1
Ronde van Drenthe	Netherlands										•	•	•	•	•	•	•	•	•	9
Trofeo Alfredo Binda-Comune di Cittiglio	Italy											•	•	•	•	•	•	•	•	8
Open de Suède Vårgårda (TTT (Note: Team time trial))	Sweden											•	•	•	•	•	•	•	•	8
Tour of Chongming Island World Cup	China													•	•	•	•	•	•	6
GP Ciudad de Valladolid	Spain													•	•					2
Sparkassen Giro	Germany																	•	•	2
The Philadelphia Cycling Classic	USA																		•	1
Total		6	9	7	9	9	9	9	11	12	9	11	10	9	9	8	8	9	10	164

== See also ==
- UCI Women's Road Rankings
- List of UCI Women's Teams
