= 2009 UCI Women's Road World Cup =

Series of bicycle races

- Twelfth edition of the UCI Women's Road World Cup

Details
- Dates: 29 March – 13 September
- Location: Europe and Canada
- Races: 10

Champions
- Individual champion: Marianne Vos (NED) (DSB Bank - Nederland bloeit)
- Teams' champion: Cervélo TestTeam

The 2009 UCI Women's Road World Cup was the 12th edition of the UCI Women's Road World Cup. The calendar contained the same races as the 2008 event with the exception of the Geelong World Cup, meaning that the campaign began instead in Italy.

== Races ==
	Date	Race	Country	Winner	Team
#1	29 March	Trofeo Alfredo Binda-Comune di Cittiglio	Italy	Marianne Vos (NED)	DSB Bank - Nederland bloeit
#2	5 April	Tour of Flanders for Women	Belgium	Ina-Yoko Teutenberg (GER)	Team Columbia–High Road Women
#3	13 April	Ronde van Drenthe	Netherlands	Emma Johansson (SWE)	Red Sun
#4	22 April	La Flèche Wallonne Féminine	Belgium	Marianne Vos (NED)	DSB Bank - Nederland bloeit
#5	10 May	Tour de Berne	Switzerland	Kristin Armstrong (USA)	Cervélo TestTeam
#6	30 May	Coupe du Monde Cycliste Féminine de Montréal	Canada	Emma Pooley (GBR)	Cervélo TestTeam
#7	31 July	Open de Suède Vårgårda TTT	Sweden	Kristin Armstrong (USA); Regina Bruins (NED); Carla Ryan (AUS); Christiane Soeder (GER); Kirsten Wild (NED); Sarah Düster (GER)	Cervélo TestTeam
#8	2 August	Open de Suède Vårgårda	Sweden	Marianne Vos (NED)	DSB Bank - Nederland bloeit
#9	22 August	GP de Plouay – Bretagne	France	Emma Pooley (GBR)	Cervélo TestTeam
#10	13 September	Rund um die Nürnberger Altstadt	Germany	Kirsten Wild (NED)	Cervélo TestTeam

== Final points standings ==
=== Individuals ===
Final result
Position	Rider	Team	Points
1	Marianne Vos (NED)	DSB Bank - Nederland bloeit	407
2	Emma Johansson (SWE)	Red Sun	379
3	Kirsten Wild (NED)	Cervélo TestTeam	248
4	Ina-Yoko Teutenberg (GER)	Team Columbia–HTC Women	161
5	Emma Pooley (GBR)	Cervélo TestTeam	150
6	Kristin Armstrong (USA)	Cervélo TestTeam	149
7	Loes Gunnewijk (NED)	Team Flexpoint	145
8	Trixi Worrack (GER)	Equipe Nürnberger Versicherung	123
9	Grace Verbeke (BEL)	Lotto–Belisol Ladiesteam	103
10	Andrea Bosman (NED)	Leontien.nl	103

=== Teams ===
Place	UCI Code	Team Name	Points
1	RLT	Cervélo TestTeam	780
2	DSB	DSB Bank - Nederland bloeit	394
3	RSC	Red Sun	384
4	NUR	Equipe Nürnberger Versicherung	345
5	TCW	Team Columbia–HTC Women	330
6	FLX	Team Flexpoint	293
7	LBL	Lotto–Belisol Ladiesteam	188
8	BCT	Bigla Cycling Team	168
9	NED	Netherlands	153
10	LNL	Leontien.nl	144

== UCI Women's Teams ==
UCI Code	Team Name	Country	Website
TUE	Team Uniqa–Elk	Austria	
LBL	Lotto–Belisol Ladiesteam	Belgium	lottoladiescycling.be
VLL	Topsport Vlaanderen Thompson Ladies Team	Belgium	cyclingteam-vlaanderen.be
BPD	Bizkaia–Durango	Spain	duranguesa.com
DKT	Debabarrena–Kirolgi	Spain	
LTK	Lointek	Spain	equipociclistaugeraga.com
ESG	ESGL 93–GSD Gestion	France	team-esgl93.fr
FUT	Vienne Futuroscope	France	cyclisme-vienne-futuroscope.com
VOR	Vision 1 Racing	United Kingdom	vision1racing.com Archived 2009-02-09 at the Wayback Machine
RLT	Cervélo TestTeam	Germany	cervelo.com
NUR	Equipe Nürnberger Versicherung	Germany	equipe-nuernberger.de
TCW	Columbia-HTC	Germany	highroadsports.com/team
GPC	Giant Pro Cycling	Hong Kong	cycling-sports.com
FEN	Fenixs	Italy	

UCI Code	Team Name	Country	Website
GAU	Gauss RDZ Ormu–Colnago	Italy	gsgauss.it
MSI	Selle Italia–Ghezzi	Italy	czdteam.it
TOG	Top Girls Fassa Bortolo Raxy Line	Italy	gstopgirls.com
MIC	S.C. Michela Fanini Record Rox	Italy	michelafanini.com
DGC	Team Cmax Dilà	Italy	teamcmax.com
USC	USC Chirio Forno d'Asolo	Italy	www.chiriofornodasolo.it
SAF	Safi–Pasta Zara–Titanedi	Italy	dream-t.com
DSB	DSB Bank–LTO	Netherlands	dsbcyclingteam.nl
LNL	Leontien.nl	Netherlands	leontien.nl
RSC	Red Sun Cycling Team	Netherlands	red-suncycling.nl
FLX	Team Flexpoint	Netherlands	teamflexpoint.com
HPU	Team Hitec Products UCK	Norway	hitecproducts-uck.no
MTW	MTN	South Africa	ryder.co.za
PTG	Petrogradets	Russia	petrogradets.ru
BCT	Bigla Cycling Team	Switzerland	biglacyclingteam.ch Archived 2009-02-19 at the Wayback Machine
