= Tracey Gaudry =

Australian cyclist

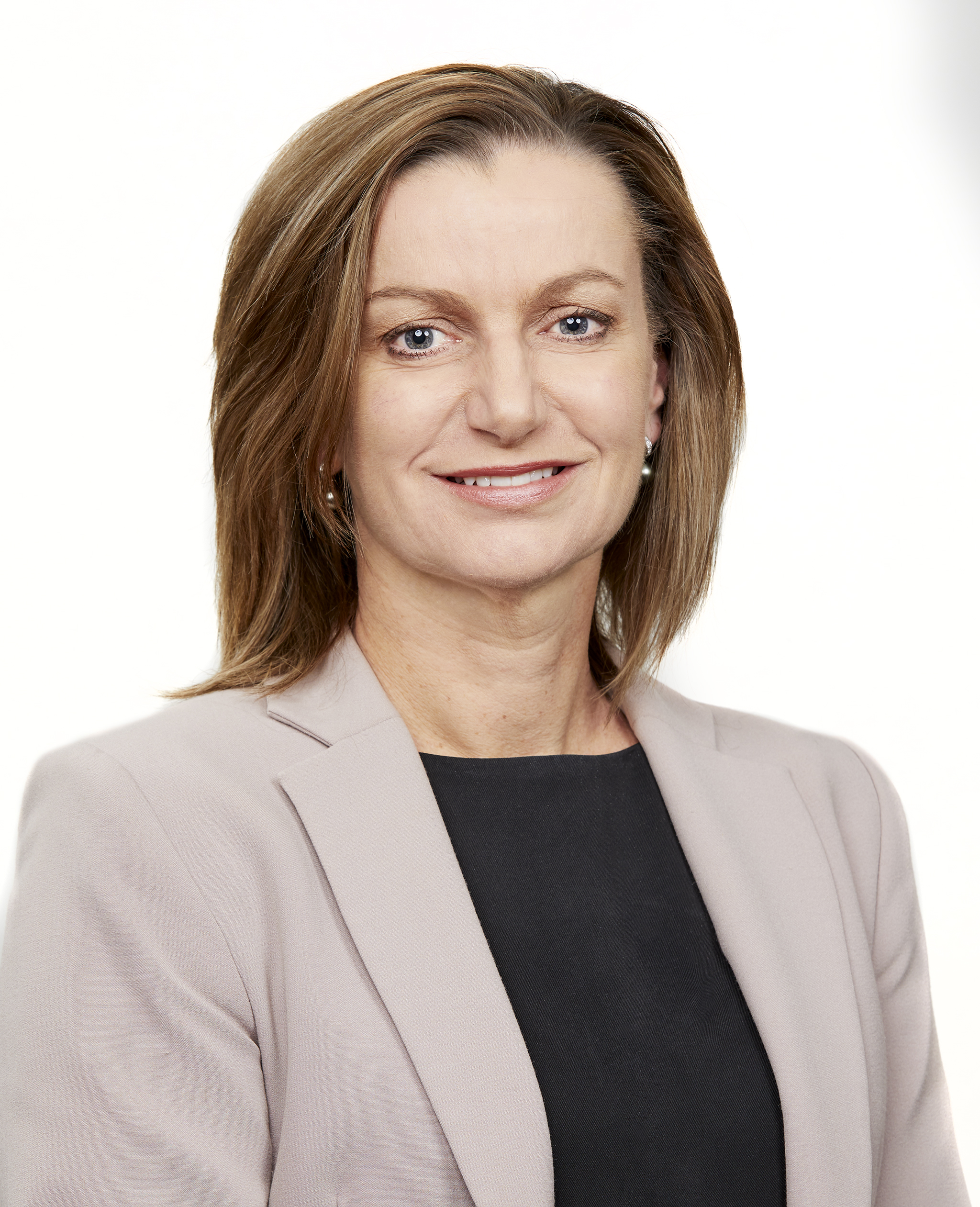
- Gaudry in 2019
- Born: Tracey Watson; 17 June 1969 (age 57); Yallourn, Victoria
- Spouse: Tony Gaudry (m. 1997–2018)

Chief Executive Officer of Comm Unity Plus Services Ltd
- Incumbent
- Assumed office 2021
- Cycling career
- Sport: Cycling

Amateur team
- 1992–2000: Geelong West Cycling Club, Canberra Cycling Club

Professional teams
- 1999–: EBLY in France
- 2000–: TIMEX in USA

Tracey Gaudry (née Watson; born 17 June 1969) is an Australian sport administrator, former professional cyclist and current chief executive officer of Comm Unity Plus Services Ltd.

Prior to her corporate executive roles, Gaudry represented Australia at two Summer Olympics (1996 and 2000) and the 1998 Commonwealth Games.

After finishing her career as an athlete, Gaudry served on numerous boards and committees, including her current appointments as member of the Track Commission of the Union Cycliste Internationale, member of Executive Board of the Oceania Cycling Confederation, member of the Board of the Deakin University Sport Business Network, and member of the Board of the Federation of Community Legal Centres.

Gaudry is a 2017 Deakin University Alumni of the Year recipient.

== Cycling career ==
Gaudry began riding seriously early in 1992 after recovering from a life-threatening illness, with support from the Victorian Institute of Sport's (VIS) cycling coach, Donna Rae-Szalenski from Geelong, and the Geelong West Cycling Club.

She first competed in the UCI World Road Cycling Championships in 1994.

From 1995 she was an Australian Institute of Sport scholarship holder. She won the Australian National Time Trial Championships in 1995.

She competed at the 1996 Summer Olympics.

In 1997, Gaudry took a break from the sport to focus on her professional career development.

In 1998, Tracey joined the Australian Women's Road squad overseas, coached by James Victor and competed in the 1998 Commonwealth Games.

In 1999, she turned professional, riding for teams EBLY in France, and TIMEX in USA. In those years Gaudry won the Tour de Snowy, Tour of Bretagne, Trophée D'or, the Montreal World Cup, the Australian National Road Race Championships and multiple UCI one-day races and stages of UCI stage races.

In 2000, Gaudry won the Australian National Time Trial Championships, UCI one-day races and stages of UCI stage races predominantly in North America. Gaudry went on to compete in the 2000 Summer Olympics in her home country.

Gaudry was ranked third in the World on official UCI rankings at the height of her career.

== Personal life ==
In 1989, Gaudry was diagnosed with lymphatic leukemia when she was 20 years old. She took up cycling after two years in remission.

Gaudry was married to Tony Gaudry from 1997 to 2018. She has three children.

== Administrative career ==
As a senior executive and non-executive director, Gaudry has held leadership roles in community, for-purpose and sport organisations for more than 20 years, championing improved outcomes for local, state, national and global communities with a focus on inclusion, diversity and gender equality.

Gaudry is a former member of the Management Committee and past Vice President of the world governing body for the sport of cycling, the Union Cycliste Internationale (UCI) where she carried multiple portfolios including Chair of the Women's Commission, Chair of the Advocacy Commission and membership to the Commission of Continental Presidents and Track Cycling Commission. For more than a decade has been instrumental in driving global reform, particularly in governance, advocacy, participation and gender equity. Tracey is the immediate past President of the Oceania Cycling Confederation.

Her executive roles have included chief executive officer of the Amy Gillett Foundation – Australia's leading advocacy organisation for bicycle rider safety, and CEO of the Hawthorn Football Club in the Australian Football League (AFL), replacing Stuart Fox. She was the first female CEO in league history. Just five months after her appointment, Gaudry resigned from her position as Hawthorn CEO. It turned out that her husband had a heart attack when she was only two days into the job.

In August 2018, the Victorian State Minister for the Prevention of Family Violence, The Hon. Natalie Hutchins MP announced that Gaudry would lead Victoria's first agency dedicated to the primary prevention of all forms of family violence and violence against women, Respect Victoria. Gaudry lead the establishment of the agency during its first three years.

Gaudry was appointed to the role of CEO Comm Unity Plus Services in June 2021.

== Cycling results ==
=== World Championships ===
- 1994 UCI Road World Championships - Women's Individual Time Trial, in Italy, 24th.
- 1995 UCI Road World Championships – Women's time trial, in Colombia, 26th.
- 1995 UCI Road World Championships - Women's Road Race, in Colombia, 16th.
- 1998 UCI Road World Championships – Women's time trial in Netherlands, 12th.
- 1998 UCI Road World Championships – Women's road race in Netherlands, 32nd.
- 1999 UCI Road World Championships – Women's time trial in Italy, 15th.
- 1999 UCI Road World Championships – Women's road race in Italy, 34th.
- 2000 UCI Road World Championships - Women's time trial in France, 11th.
- 2000 UCI Road World Championships - Women's road race in France, 16th.

=== Olympic Games ===
- 1996 Atlanta Olympics Women's Individual Road Race, 39th. (Tracey Watson, A.I.S.)
- 2000 Sydney Olympics Women's Individual Road Race, 23rd.
- 2000 Sydney Olympics Women's Individual Time Trial, 21st.

=== Commonwealth Games ===
- 1998 Commonwealth Games Women's Road Race, 5th.

=== National Championships ===
- 1995 Australian Women's Road Race, 1st
- 1999 Australian Women's Road Race, 1st
- 2000 Australian Women's Individual Time Trial, 1st
- 10 National Championship medals

=== World rankings ===
- 1999 UCI Women's Road World Ranking Tracey Gaudry (Aus), 3rd

=== World Cup rankings ===
- 1999 UCI Women's Road World Cup Tracey Gaudry (Aus), 3rd
- 2000 UCI Women's Road World Cup at end of round 7. Tracey Gaudry (Aus) Timex, 32nd.
