= Australian National Road Cycling Championships =

The Australian National Road Cycling Championships are held annually and are composed of competitions of various road cycling disciplines across various age, gender, and disability categories.

== Road race ==
Latest Results

Category	Gender	Gold	Silver	Bronze	Ref.
Elite	Men	Luke Durbridge	Luke Plapp	Liam Walsh	
Elite	Women	Lucinda Stewart (Note: In winning the elite race, Lucinda Stewart also won the U23 race.)||Ella Simpson||Cassia Boglio||			
U 23	Men	Julian Baudry||Fergus Browning||Jack Clark||			
U 23	Women	Lucinda Stewart ||Sophia Sammons||Alyssa Polites||			
U 19	Men	Alexander Hewes||Jonas Shelverton||Fletcher Medway||			
U 19	Women	Anna Dubier||Amelie Sanders||Leani Van der Berg||			

== Individual time trial ==
Latest Results

Category	Gender	Gold	Silver	Bronze	Ref.
Elite	Men	Luke Plapp || Jay Vine || Kelland O'Brien ||			
Elite	Women	Brodie Chapman || Amber Pate || Anya Louw ||			
U 23	Men	Zac Marriage|| Fergus Browning|| John Carter||			
U 23	Women	Alli Anderson|| Felicity Wilson-Haffenden|| Sophia Sammons||			
U 19	Men	Max Goold || Lucas Stevenson || Fletcher Medway ||			
U 19	Women	Amelie Sanders || Georgia Gardiner || Leani Van der Berg ||			

== Criterium ==
Latest Results

Category	Gender	Gold	Silver	Bronze	Ref.
Elite	Men	Sam Welsford||Cameron Scott||Blake Quick||			
Elite	Women	Amber Pate||Keira Will||Maeve Plouffe||			
U 23	Men	John Carter||Leo Zimmermann||Brayden Bloch||			
U 23	Women	Keira Will||Alyssa Polites||Belinda Bailey||			
U 19	Men	Ollie Jirovec||Donovan Mackie||Alexander Hewes||			
U 19	Women	Amelie Sanders||Anna Dubier||Ruby Taylor||			
