= Tour de Snowy =

Race details
- Date: March/April
- Region: New South Wales/Canberra
- Type: Women road stage race

History
- First edition: 1998
- Editions: 5
- Final edition: 2002
- First winner: (United States) Dede Demet
- Final winner: (Germany) Judith Arndt

The Tour de Snowy was an international women's road bicycle race held in the Snowy Mountains region of New South Wales, Australia from 1998 to 2002. The Tour had from five to nine stages and attracted professional cyclists from around the world as an important event in the women's road racing calendar.

Originally sponsored by the Snowy Mountains Hydro-Electric Authority and the NSW Department of Sport & Recreation, the Tour De Snowy was discontinued in 2003 due to lack of sponsorship.

== General Classification Winners ==
Year	1st Place	2nd Place	3rd Place
1998	(United States) Dede Demet	(Australia) Anna Wilson	(France) Jeannie Longo
1999	(Australia) Tracey Gaudry	(United States) Karen Kurreck	(Slovakia) Lenka Ilavská
2000	(Canada) Geneviève Jeanson	(Australia) Tracey Gaudry	(Australia) Anna Wilson
2001	(United States) Kim Bruckner	(Belarus) Zinaida Stahurskaia	(Australia) Margaret Hemsley
2002	(Germany) Judith Arndt	(Netherlands) Mirjam Melchers	(Sweden) Susanne Ljungskog
