= Coupe du Monde Cycliste Féminine de Montréal =

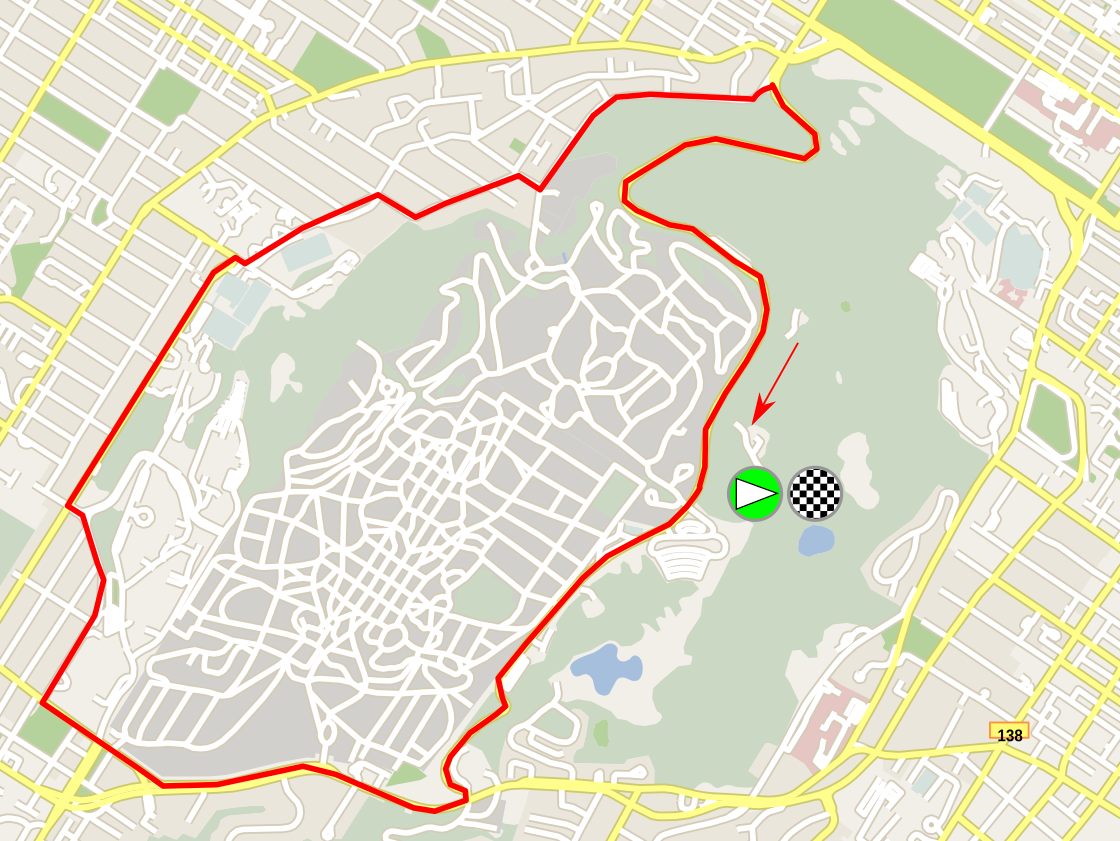
- Course used between 1998 and 2005

Race details
- Date: September
- Region: Montreal, Quebec, Canada
- English name: Women's Cycling World Cup of Montreal
- Discipline: Road
- Competition: UCI Women's Road World Cup
- Type: One-day race

History
- First edition: 1998
- Editions: 11
- Final edition: 2009
- First winner: Diana Žiliūtė (LTU)
- Most wins: Geneviève Jeanson (CAN) (4)
- Final winner: Emma Pooley (GBR)

The Coupe du Monde Cycliste Féminine de Montréal (English: Women's Cycling World Cup of Montreal, or simply Montreal World Cup) was an elite women's professional road bicycle racing event held annually between 1998 and 2009 in Montréal, Quebec, Canada as part of the UCI Women's Road Cycling World Cup season. The race used a hilly circuit around Mount Royal, similar to that used at the 1974 UCI Road World Championships, 1976 Summer Olympics and other races.

In 2010, the race was cancelled, with organisers blaming the creation of two new men's races – Grand Prix Cycliste de Montréal and Grand Prix Cycliste de Québec – that made finding sponsorship impossible.

In 2024, organisers of the Grand Prix Cycliste de Montréal noted that they wished to stage a women's race in future, potentially as part of the UCI Women's World Tour.

== Course ==
The course was a 8 kilometres (5.0 mi) hilly circuit around Mount Royal, with the key climb being Côte Camilien-Houde (1.8 km long and 8% average grade) located before the finish line. The course was lapped multiple times, with a total race distance of around 100 kilometres (62 mi).

Iterations of the circuit have been used for:

- 1974 UCI Road World Championships, when Eddy Merckx won
- 1976 Summer Olympics
- Grand Prix des Amériques, held between 1989 and 1992, part of the UCI Road World Cup

== Past winners ==
Year	Country	Rider	Team
1998	Lithuania	Diana Žiliūtė	Lithuania
1999	Australia	Tracey Gaudry	Ebly
2000	Finland	Pia Sundstedt	Gas Sport Team
2001	Canada	Geneviève Jeanson	Rona
2002	United States	Dede Barry	TalgoAmerica.com
2003	Canada	Geneviève Jeanson	Rona-Esker
2004	Canada	Geneviève Jeanson	Rona
2005	Canada	Geneviève Jeanson	Rona
2006	Germany	Judith Arndt	T-Mobile
2007	Italy	Fabiana Luperini	Menikini-Selle Italia-Gysko
2008	Germany	Judith Arndt	High Road
2009	Great Britain	Emma Pooley	Cervélo TestTeam
