= Diana Žiliūtė =

Lithuanian cyclist (born 1976)

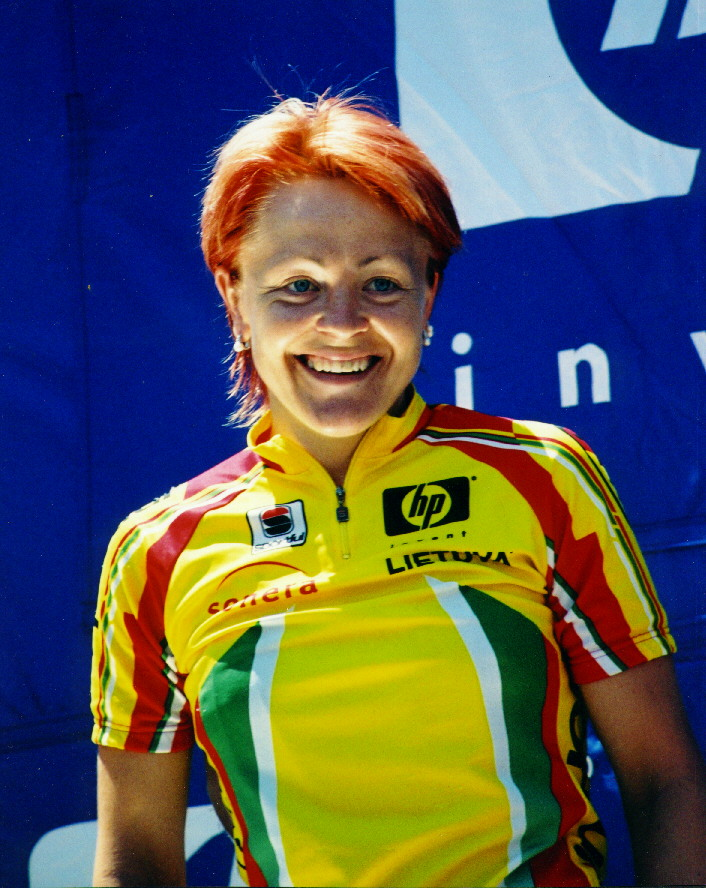

Personal information
- Full name: Diana Žiliūtė
- Born: 28 May 1976 (age 50) Rietavas, Lithuanian SSR, Soviet Union

Cycling career
- Sport: Cycling
- Disciplines: Road and track
- Role: Rider
Medal record
Representing Lithuania
Women's road cycling
Olympic Games
Bronze medal – third place	2000 Sydney	Road Race
World Championships
Gold medal – first place	1998	Road race
Silver medal – second place	1994	Team time trial
Bronze medal – third place	1999	Road race

Diana Žiliūtė (Lithuanian pronunciation: [dʲɪjɛˈnɐ ʑɪˈlʲuːtʲeː]; born 28 May 1976 in Rietavas) is a Lithuanian racing cyclist who dominated women's road racing in the late 1990s.

She made her debut in the pro cycling ranks in the mid-1990s after winning the 1994 World Junior Road Race Championship. She rose to the top of women's cycling in 1998 when she won two World Road Cup races, the overall World Road Cup title, and capped the season by winning the World Road Race Championships and leading the UCI Women's Road World Rankings.

The following year (1999), she further demonstrated her all around prowess by winning the Grande Boucle, one of the hardest stage races in women's cycle racing history. This was followed in 2000 by a bronze medal at the Summer Olympics.

For her achievements, Žiliūtė was awarded the Order of Gediminas, a Lithuanian state honor.

== Major results ==
1994
UCI Road World Championships

1st Junior Road Race
2nd Team Time Trial

2nd Overall Essen Etappenfahrt
3rd Overall Tour de Bretagne
3rd Overall Tour du Finistère

1996
2nd U23 Road Race, UEC European Road Championships
3rd Trofeo Alfredo Binda

1997
1st U23 Time Trial, UEC European Road Championships
2nd Vertemate con Minoprio

1998
1st Overall UCI Women's Road World Cup
1st Road Race, UCI Road World Championships
UEC European Road Championships

1st U23 Time Trial
2nd U23 Road Race

National Road Championships

1st Road Race
2nd Time Trial

1st Rotterdam Tour
1st Ottawa
1st Ladies Tour Beneden Maas
1st Stage 3 Giro d'Italia Femminile
2nd Liberty Classic
3rd Overall Women's Challenge

1st Stage 3

3rd Trophée International de Saint-Amand-Mont-Rond
4th UCI Road World Championships – Women's time trial

1999
1st Road Race, National Road Championships
1st Overall Tour de France Feminine
3rd Road Race, UCI Road World Championships
8th UCI Road World Championships – Women's time trial

2000
1st Overall UCI Women's Road World Cup
1st Overall Vuelta Ciclista a Navarra

1st Stages 1, 2, 3 & 4

1st Primavera Rosa
1st Le Critérium International Féminin De Lachine
1st GP Ouest France,
1st Stage 3 Giro d'Italia Femminile
2nd Overall Women's Challenge

1st Stages 3 & 6

2nd Liberty Classic
Olympic Games

3rd Road Race
9th Time Trial

3rd Coupe du Monde Cycliste Féminine de Montréal
4th La Flèche Wallonne

2001
2nd Overall Giro d'Italia Femminile

1st Stage 13

2nd Overall Holland Ladies Tour
2nd Berner Rundfahrt
2nd Souvenir Magali Pache
3rd Trofeo Alfredo Binda
8th Road Race, UCI Road World Championships
9th UCI Road World Championships – Women's time trial

2002
1st Stage 9 Women's Challenge
2nd Primavera Rosa
3rd Overall Giro d'Italia Femminile

2003
National Road Championships

1st Road Race
2nd Time Trial

1st Trofeo Alfredo Binda
1st Rund um die Nürnberger Altstadt
1st Stages 1, 2 & 7 Holland Ladies Tour
1st Stage 3 Tour du Grand Montréal
2nd GP Carnevale d'Europa
2nd Rotterdam Tour

2004
National Road Championships

1st Road Race
1st Time Trial

1st Prologue & Stage 6 Giro d'Italia Femminile

2006
1st Road Race, National Road Championships
1st GP Liberazione
1st Prologue, Stage 1, 5, 6, & 7 Route de France Féminine
1st Prologue & Stage 1 Giro di San Marino
2nd Giro del Lago Maggiore
2nd Coppa dei Laghi
2nd Trofeo Alfredo Binda
2nd GP Carnevale d'Europa
8th Rotterdam Tour

2007
1st Overall Tour de Prince Edward Island

1st Stage 2

1st Stage 1 Tour Cycliste Féminin Ardèche Sud Rhone Alpes
1st Stage 4b Giro della Toscana Int. Femminile
2nd Road Race, National Road Championships

2008
1st Giornata Rosa di Nove
1st GP Carnevale d'Europa
1st Stages 1, 2b & 3 Grande Boucle Féminine Internationale
1st Stages 3 & 5 Tour Cycliste Féminin Ardèche Sud Rhone Alpes
2nd Time Trial, National Road Championships
3rd Trofeo Alfredo Binda
6th Road Race, UCI Road World Championships

2009
National Road Championships

1st Time Trial
2nd Road Race

1st Overall Trophée d'Or Féminin

1st Stages 2, 3, & 6

1st Overall Giro della Toscana Int. Femminile
1st Prologue Route de France Féminine
5th Road Race, UCI Road World Championships
9th GP Ouest France

Awards
Preceded by (Lithuania) Raimondas Šiugždinis	Best Lithuanian sportsman of the Year; 1998	Succeeded by (Lithuania) Edita Pučinskaitė
Sporting positions
Preceded by None	World Cup Overall Points Champion; 1998	Succeeded by Anna Wilson
Preceded by Anna Wilson	World Cup Overall Points Champion; 2000	Succeeded by Anna Millward (nee Wilson)
