= Sara Carrigan =

Australian cyclist (born 1980)

Sara Carrigan OAM
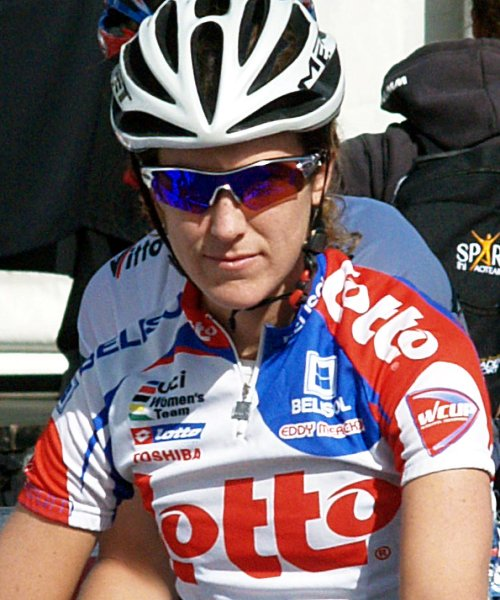

Personal information
- Born: 7 September 1980 (age 46) Gunnedah, New South Wales, Australia

Cycling career
- Sport: Cycling
- Discipline: Road
- Role: Rider
Medal record
Representing Australia
Women's road cycling
Olympic Games
Gold medal – first place	2004 Athens	Individual Road Race
Commonwealth Games
Bronze medal – third place	2006 Melbourne	Road Time Trial

Sara Carrigan OAM (born 7 September 1980 in Gunnedah, New South Wales) is a professional cyclist from Australia, who commenced her cycling career in 1996 at the age of fifteen and is currently a member of the Belgian Lotto–Belisol Ladiesteam.

She was formerly a member of Professional cycling Team, Van Bemmelen – AA Drink (NED). She lives in Nerang in Queensland and is a member of the Gold Coast Cats cycling club. She graduated from Somerset College in 1998 and completed her tertiary education at Griffith University.

Her greatest success as a road cyclist has been in the 2004 Summer Olympics Women's Road race where she won the gold medal. With a few laps to the finish Carrigan crossed a gap to the leading group to join fellow Australian cyclist, Oenone Wood. At the start of the final lap Carrigan broke away, with only Judith Arndt of Germany following, leaving Wood to successfully distract the rest in the following group, allowing her to win the gold medal.

Carrigan was an Australian Institute of Sport scholarship holder. She was awarded the Order of Australia Medal (OAM) in the 2005 Australia Day Honours List. Other awards include Australian Female Road Cyclist of the Year in 2002, 2003, 2004.

In 2009, Carrigan was inducted into the Queensland Sport Hall of Fame. In 2015, she was an inaugural Cycling Australia Hall of Fame inductee.

== Major results ==
1999
1st Teams TT Prologue Trophee d'Or FRA
1st U23 Thuringen Rundfahrt GER
2000
1st Stage 8 Tour de Snowy NSW
2001
1st Sprint Classification Giro della Toscana ITA
1st U23 Trophee d'or Feminin FRA
1st U23 Tour de Snowy AUS
2002
1st Australian National Time Trial Championships, VIC
5th UCI Road World Championships – Women's time trial
2003
1st Road Geelong World Cup AUS
1st Stage 5 TT Tour de l'Aude FRA
1st Stage 7b Tour de l'Aude FRA
1st Time Trial Australian Titles VIC
2004
1st 2004 Summer Olympics Road Race GRE
2005
2nd Australian National Time Trial Championships SA
2nd Australian National Road Race Championships SA
2nd Stage 4 Women's Tour NZL
2nd Individual Pursuit Australian Track Titles SA
3rd Overall Vuelta Ciclista Castilla y Leon Feminas ESP
3rd Stage 1 Vuelta Ciclista Castilla y Leon Feminas ESP
2006
2nd Australian National Time Trial Championships
2nd Australian National Road Race Championships
2007
1st Sprint classification Bay Classic Series AUS
