= Vanja Vonckx =

Belgian cyclist

Personal information
- Full name: Vanja Vonckx
- Born: 12 February 1973 (age 53) Bonheiden, Belgium

Cycling career
- Sport: Cycling
- Role: Rider

Vanja Vonckx (born 12 February 1973) is a former Belgian racing cyclist. She finished in second place in the Belgian National Road Race Championships in 1999. She also competed in the women's road race at the 2000 Summer Olympics.
