= Rund um die Nürnberger Altstadt =

Former cycling road race in Germany

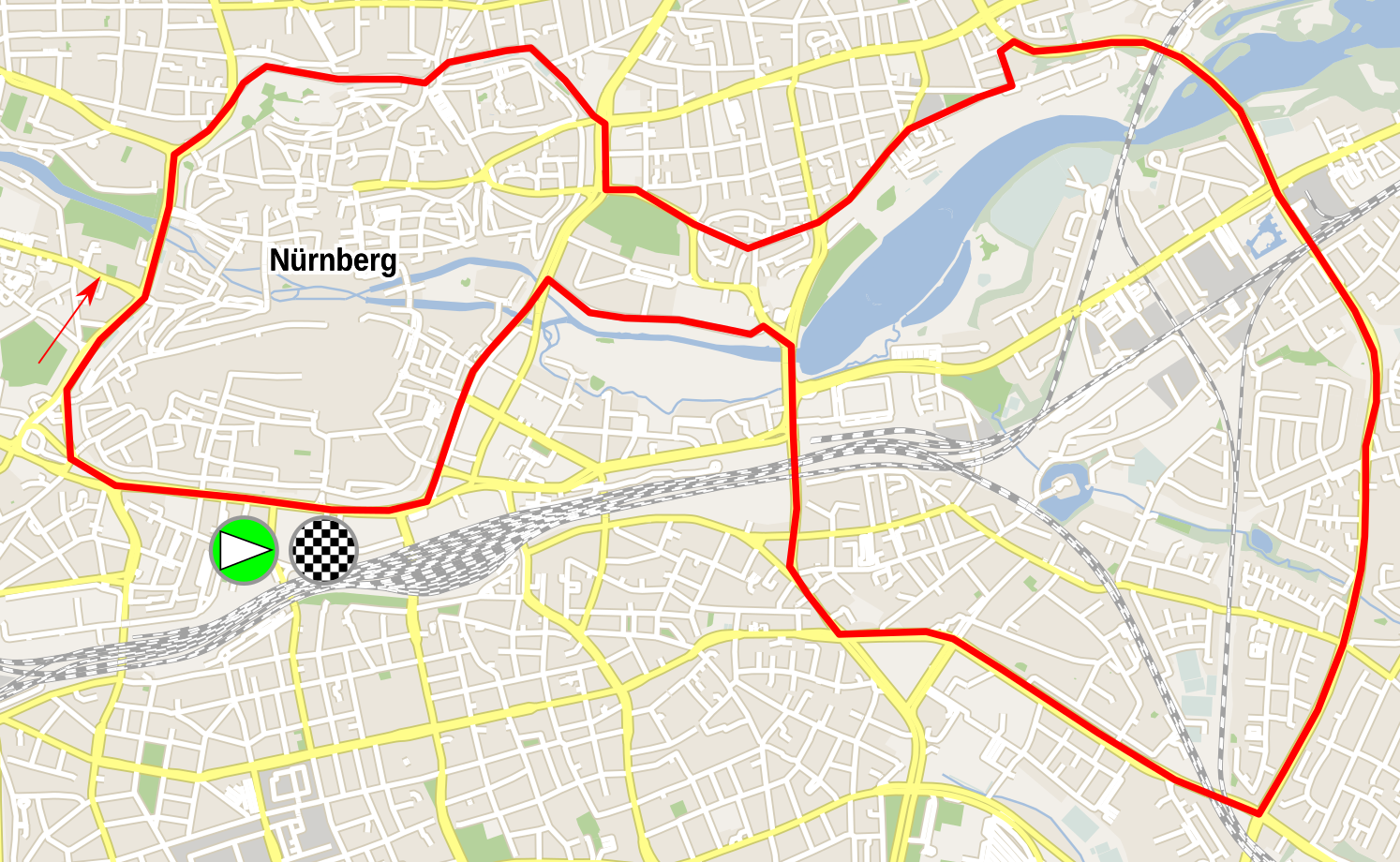
- Course map

Race details
- Date: September
- Region: Nuremberg, Germany
- English name: Tour of Old Town Nuremberg
- Local name: Rund um die Nürnberger Altstadt (in German)
- Discipline: Road
- Competition: UCI Women's Road World Cup; UCI Europe Tour
- Type: One-day race

History (men)
- First edition: 1991
- Editions: 21
- Final edition: 2012
- First winner: Stephan Gottschling (GER)
- Most wins: No repeat winners
- Final winner: Andreas Schillinger (GER)

History (women)
- First edition: 1993
- Editions: 17
- Final edition: 2010
- First winner: Ina-Yoko Teutenberg (GER)
- Most wins: Jenny Algelid (SWE); Barbara Heeb (GER); Petra Rossner (GER) (2)
- Final winner: Trixi Worrack (GER)

Rund um die Nürnberger Altstadt (English: Tour of Old Town Nuremberg) was an elite men's and women's professional road bicycle racing event held each September in the old town section of Nuremberg, Germany.

First held in 1991 as a men's race, a women's race was held from 1993. The women's event was part of the UCI Women's Road World Cup between 2003 and 2009, with the men's race part of the UCI Europe Tour between 2005 and 2009.

The last race took place in 2012, with the course subsequently used in the Bayern Rundfahrt between 2013 and 2015, and the Deutschland Tour in 2021.

== Course ==
The race used a 13 kilometres (8.1 mi) "fairly flat" course around the old town section of Nuremberg.

== Past winners ==
=== Women ===
The women's event was part of the UCI Women's Road World Cup between 2003 and 2009.

Year	Country	Rider	Team
1993	Germany	Ina-Yoko Teutenberg	
1994	Germany	Viola Paulitz	
1995	Germany	Petra Rossner	
1996	Belgium	Elsde Cottenier	
1997	Germany	Barbara Heeb	
1998	Germany	Barbara Heeb	
1999	Germany	Vera Hohlfeld	
2000	Germany	Regina Schleicher	
2001	Sweden	Jenny Algelid	Equipe Nürnberger
2002	Sweden	Jenny Algelid	Equipe Nürnberger Versicherung
2003	Lithuania	Diana Žiliūtė	Acca Due O Pasta Zara Lorena Camicie
2004	Germany	Petra Rossner	Equipe Nürnberger Versicherung
2005	Italy	Giorgia Bronzini	Italian National Team
2006	Germany	Regina Schleicher	Equipe Nürnberger Versicherung
2007	Netherlands	Marianne Vos	Team DSB Bank
2008	Germany	Judith Arndt	Team High Road Women
2009	Netherlands	Kirsten Wild	Cervélo TestTeam
2010	Netherlands	Trixi Worrack	

=== Men ===
The men's event was part of the UCI Europe Tour and was UCI rated 1.1 between 2005 and 2009.

Year	Country	Rider	Team
1991	Germany	Stephan Gottschling	
1992	Germany	Bert Dietz	
1993	Germany	Steffen Rein	
1994	Germany	Andreas Walzer	
1995	Italy	Fabio Baldato	
1996	Germany	Jan Schaffrath	
1997	Denmark	Michael Holst-Kyneb	
1998	Germany	Jan Ullrich	Team Telekom
1999	Germany	Jens Zemke	
2000	Germany	Raphael Schweda	
2001	Germany	Olaf Pollack	Gerolsteiner
2002	Germany	Erik Zabel	Team Telekom
2003	Germany	Kai Hundertmarck	Team Telekom
2004	Germany	Sebastian Siedler	Team Wiesenhof
2005	Germany	Ronny Scholz	Gerolsteiner
2006	Germany	Gerald Ciolek	Team Wiesenhof-Akud
2007	Germany	Fabian Wegmann	Gerolsteiner
2008	Germany	André Greipel	Team Columbia
2009	Italy	Francesco Gavazzi	Lampre–NGC
2010	Germany	Eric Baumann	
2011	Germany	Helmut Trettwer	
2012	Germany	Andreas Schillinger	
