= Trophée International =

Race details
- Date: Early August
- Region: France
- English name: International Trophy
- Discipline: Road
- Competition: UCI Women's Road World Cup (1998, 1999, 2001)
- Type: One-day race

History
- First edition: 1996
- Editions: 6
- Final edition: 2001
- First winner: Alessandra Cappellotto (ITA)
- Final winner: Olga Slyusareva (RUS)

The Trophée International was an elite women's professional one-day road bicycle race held between 1996 and 2001 in France.

It usually took place the day before the women's Tour de France. In 1998, 1999 and 2001 it was part of the UCI Women's Road Cycling World Cup.

The event was held in different locations each year: in 1996, in Pornic (Loire-Atlantique); in 1997, between Lac de Madine and Metz (Lorraine); in 1998, between Le Chapelle St Ursin and Saint-Amand-Montrond; in 1999, between Beauvois-en-Cambrésis (Nord-Pas-de-Calais) and Hirson (Picardy); in 2000, between Villeneuve-Loubet and Valberg (Alpes-Maritimes) and; in 2001, between La Brède and Pauillac (Gironde).

The race was co-organised by Team France Organisation and Racing Club Olympique, who were also responsible for organising the Tour de France Féminin.

== Past winners ==
Year	Country	Rider	Team
1996	France	team FRANCE	
1997	Germany	Hanka Kupfernagel	
1998	Italy	Alessandra Cappellotto	
1999	Belgium	Vanja Vonckx	
2000	France	Séverine Desbouys	
2001	Russia	Olga Slyusareva	
