= Oenone Wood =

Australian cyclist

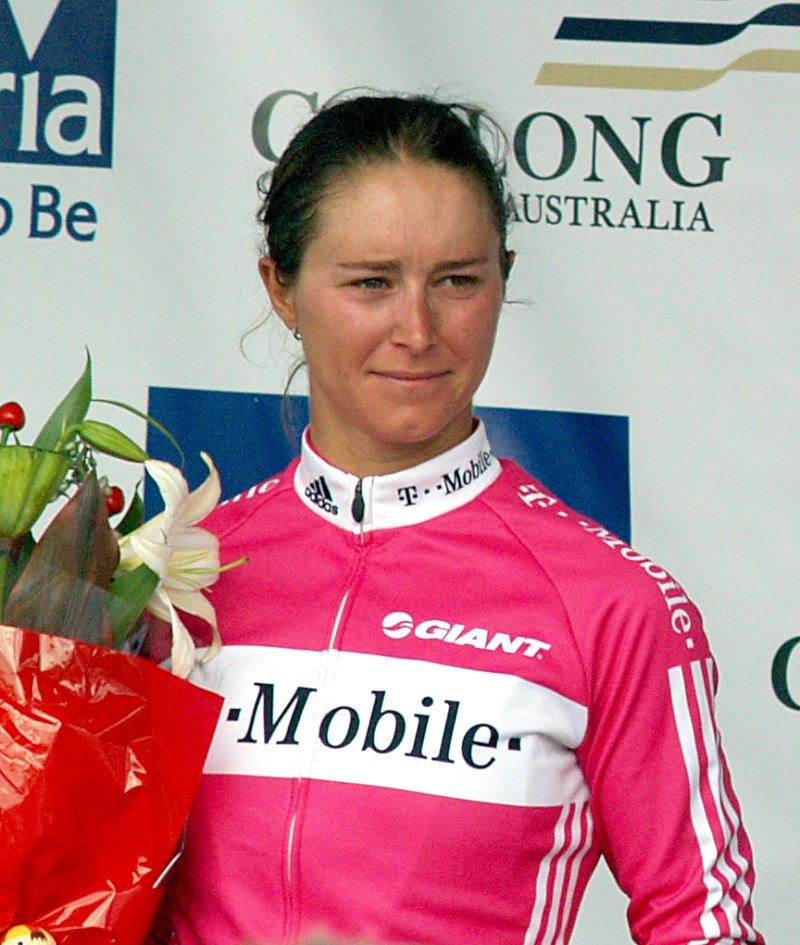
- Wood in 2007

Personal information
- Full name: Oenone Lee Wood
- Born: 24 September 1980 (age 46) Newcastle, Australia
- Height: 1.58 m (5 ft 2 in)
- Weight: 56 kg (123 lb)

Cycling career
- Sport: Cycling
- Current team: Retired
- Discipline: Road
- Role: Rider

Major wins
- 2004 Geelong World Cup; 2004 World Cup Series; 2005 World Cup Series; 2006 Commonwealth Games; Individual Time Trial
Medal record
Women's Cycling
Representing Australia
World Championships
Bronze medal – third place	2005	Road race
Commonwealth Games
Gold medal – first place	2006 Melbourne	Road time trial
Silver medal – second place	2006 Melbourne	Road race

Oenone Wood (born 24 September 1980 in Newcastle, New South Wales, Australia) is a retired professional cyclist, who commenced her cycling career in 2001 at the age of 21. She was an Australian Institute of Sport scholarship holder.

She was a member of professional cycling Velocio–SRAM Pro Cycling (USA) and the Canberra Cycling Club, and formerly of the T-Mobile Professional Women's Cycling Team (GER) and Equipe Nürnberger Versicherung. She lives in Merewether, a suburb of Newcastle.

Oenone achieved success as a road cyclist in Australia, including the Bay Criterium Series, and the Geelong Tour.

She had great success overseas, particularly winning stages of the Giro d'Italia Femminile (ITA) and the Points Classification for the Giro d'Italia Femminile in 2004 and 2005, as well winning the UCI Women's Road World Cup series in 2004 and 2005. In the 2004 Summer Olympics Women's Road race she was in the leading group with fellow Australian Sara Carrigan, and when Carrigan and Judith Arndt broke away in the final lap to win the gold and silver medals, Wood had to sprint for the bronze medal with Olga Slyusareva of Russia and Nicole Cooke of Great Britain, coming 4th overall in the race.

She won the Women's Time Trial at the 2006 Commonwealth Games in Melbourne, also winning the silver medal in the Women's Road Race, behind fellow Australian Natalie Bates.

She was the 2004 and 2008 Australian Open Road champion (in the Elite Women's Road Race event).

In 2016, she was inducted into Cycling Australia Hall of Fame.

== Major results ==
2003
UCI Points list – 18th place
1st, Grand Prix Cavrie (Ita)
3rd, Flèche Wallonne (World Cup)
6th, Primavera Rosa (World Cup)
3rd overall and 1 stage win, Trophee d'Or (cat. 2)
4th overall, Giro della Toscana (cat. 1)
7th overall, Castilla y Leon Tour (cat. 1)
2004
1st Overall UCI Women's Road World Cup
1st 2004 Road World Cup Rankings
1st Criterium Series Tour Down Under AUS
1st Australian Open Road Race Title VIC
1st Australian Open Road Time Trial Title VIC
1st Road World Cup Geelong AUS
1st Stage 1 Giro d'Italia Femminile ITA
1st Points Classification Giro d'Italia Femminile ITA
1st Overall Geelong Tour AUS
1st Stage 2 Geelong Tour AUS
1st Giro Frazioni ITA
1st Trofeo Citta di Rosignano ITA
1st Trofeo Museo Alfredo Binda ITA
1st Souvenir Magali Pache SUI
9th UCI Road World Championships – Women's time trial
2005
1st Overall UCI Women's Road World Cup
1st, Tour du Grand Montréal
1st, Points classification and Stages 1, 3a and 6, Tour de l'Aude Cycliste Féminin FRA
1st, Australia Australian Open Road Time Trial Titles SA
1st, Australia Australian Criterium Title VIC
1st, Bay Series Criteriums VIC

1st, Round 2
1st, Round 3

1st, Overall Geelong Tour AUS

1st, Sprint Classification
1st, Stage 2
1st, Stage 4

2006 (Equipe Nürnberger Versicherung)
2007
1st, Overall, Tour du Grand Montréal CAN (2.1W)

1st, Points classification
1st, Sprint classification
1st, Stage 4
1st, Stage 5

2008
1st Australian Open Road Race Titles VIC

Sporting positions
Preceded by Nicole Cooke	World Cup Overall Points Champion; 2004, 2005	Succeeded by Nicole Cooke
