= Anna Millward =

Australian cyclist

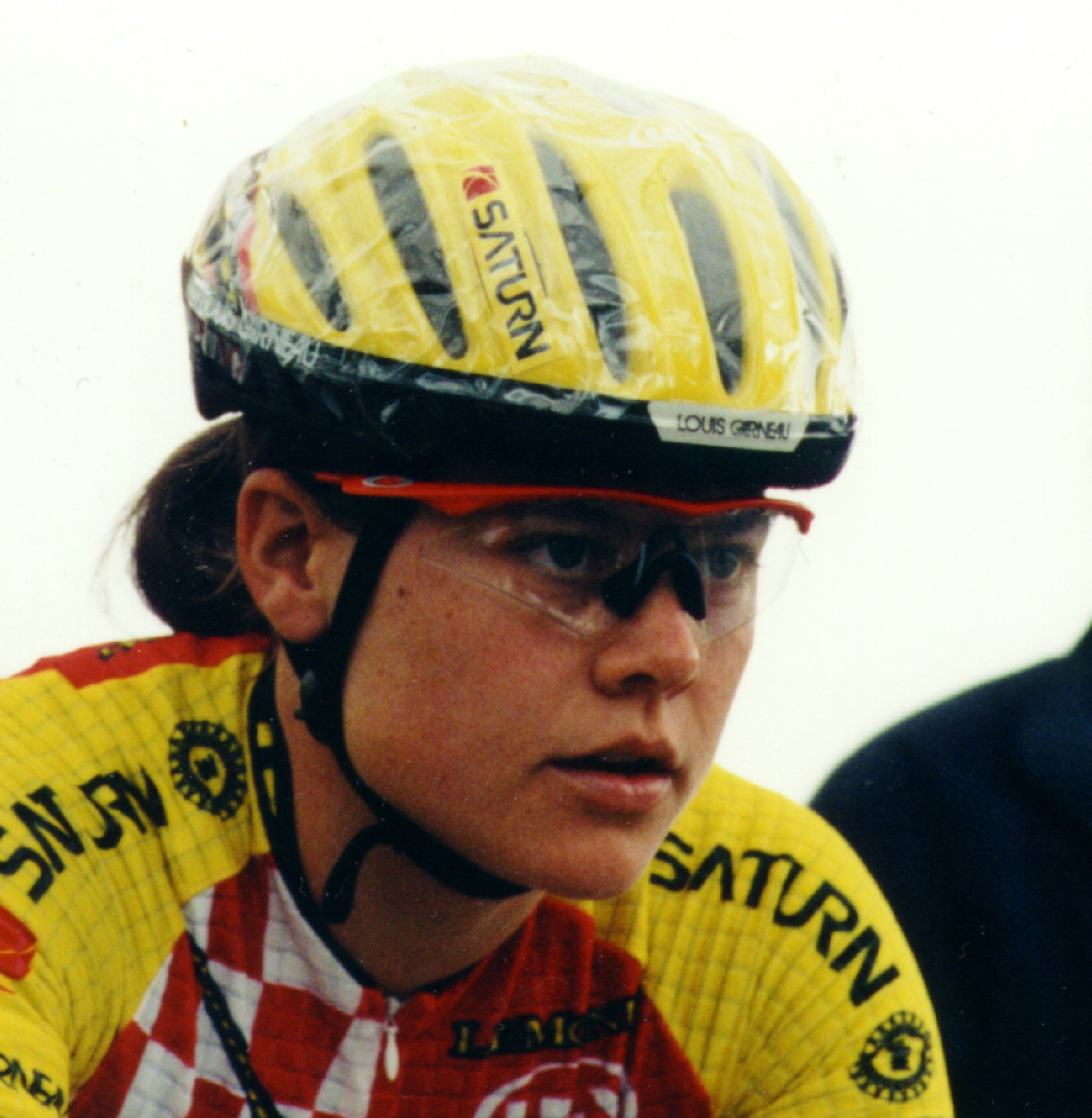
- Millward at the 2000 Tour of Willamette

Personal information
- Full name: Anna Millward
- Born: 26 November 1971 (age 54) Melbourne, Australia
- Height: 1.63 m (5 ft 4 in)
- Weight: 56 kg (123 lb)

Cycling career
- Sport: Cycling
- Discipline: Road
- Role: Rider

Professional team
- 1999–2002: Saturn
Medal record
Representing Australia
Women’s Cycling
UCI Road World Championships
Silver medal – second place	1999	Road race
Silver medal – second place	1999	Time Trial
Commonwealth Games
Gold medal – first place	1998 Kuala Lumpur	28km Individual Time Trial
Bronze medal – third place	1998 Kuala Lumpur	92km Road Race
Silver medal – second place	2002 Manchester	Individual Time Trial

Anna Millward, née Wilson, (born 26 November 1971) is an Australian cycle racer. During her cycling career, she won the overall UCI points title in 2001, and twice was UCI overall World Cup points champion, winning a total of 5 World Cup races in her career. She also won two silver medals in the UCI Road World Championship competition in 1999 and twice won the Women's Challenge race (1996 and 2000).

In the 2000 Sydney Olympics she finished fourth in both the time trial and the road race. In the month after her home Olympics, on 18 October, she broke the UCI women's Hour record in Melbourne with a distance of 43.501 km. Millward had broken the hour record for the first time in 22 years, but she was to hold it for less than a month (Jeannie Longo rode 44.767 km in November 2000).

In the 1998 Commonwealth Games, she won gold in the time trial and bronze in the road race, she won a silver in the 2002 Commonwealth Games time trial.

In 2000, a portrait of her by Simon Benz was hung in the Archibald Prize.

== Biography ==
Anna Millward (Wilson until her marriage in 2000) did not start out in life as an athlete. Instead, with the encouragement of her family, especially her father, who died when she was 11 years old, academics were given great emphasis in her upbringing. At that point in life, Millward concentrated on her youthful passion, the sciences. Later, at the urging of a teacher, she pursued a combined law and science degree at Monash University. The study of law gradually gained favor with her until she made it her primary study, eventually graduating with a degree in law in 1996.

It was also while attending university that she discovered her other passion - the bicycle. Initially riding a bicycle commuting to and from school, Millward and some friends decided to enter the Great Victorian Bike Ride, a nine-day recreational tour. Millward traces her passion for the bike to this tour.

Then in 1993, she decided to enter her first race, a lower grade event with her local club which she won. This marked the beginnings of a cycling career that would lead to many victories in more prestigious events.

== Major results ==
1996
1st A stage of the Tour of Majorca
6th Liberty Classic
1st Overall, Women's Challenge

1st Stage 5
2nd TT Stage

Olympic team member (Australia)
18th UCI World Points Rankings

1997
1st Overall, Street Skills

2 stage victories, Sprint and Points jerseys

1st (Australia) Australian National Time Trial Championships
2nd Australian National Road Race Championships

1998
Grande Boucle (Tour Cycliste Feminin)

1st Stage 6

14th Overall, Giro d'Italia Femminile (2.9.1)

1st Points Classification
1st Stage 4
1st Stage 7a
1st Stage 10

Women's Challenge

1st Boise to Idaho City Road Race

2nd Overall, Canberra Women's Cycling Classic (Tour de Snowy)

Winner stages 3 and 5
1st Queen of the Mountains classification

2nd Overall, Street Skills Stage Race

1st Stage 4

1st Discovery Channel Women's Cycling Classic

1st Stage 1
1st Stage 3
1st Stage 4

1st Time Trial, Commonwealth Games
3rd Road Race, Commonwealth Games

1999
2nd UCI Road World Championships – Women's time trial
2nd Road Race, World Championships
1st Overall UCI Women's Road World Cup
1st GP Tell World Cup (Switzerland)
1st Tour de Suisse Feminin Prologue
1st GP des Nations Time Trial
1st New York City Women's Challenge
3rd Beneden-Maas World Cup (Netherlands)
4th Overall, Red Zinger Classic

1st Stage 3

Superweek

1st Stage 7

Women's Challenge (2.9.1)

1st Stage 1
1st Points jersey

Montreal (Can) World Cup - 3rd place
Tour de l'Aude (2.9.1)

1st Stage 6A

1st Athens Twilight Criterium
2nd LeFleur Criterium
6th Overall, Tour of Willamette

1st Prologue
1st Stage 3
1st Stage 4

1st Overall, Boulder-Roubaix

1st Stage 1 (Criterium)

1st Overall, Sea Otter Classic

1st Stage 1
1st Stage 3

3rd Street Skills
Wine Country Classic

1st Graton Road Race
2nd Criterium Stage

1st Canberra (Aus) World Cup
5th Overall, Canberra Women's Cycling Classic (Tour de Snowy)

1st Stage 6

2000
Set World Hour Record - 43.5 km (since broken)
Olympic Games

4th Time Trial
4th Road Race

Thuringen-Rundfahrt (2.9.1) - 6th overall

Winner prologue and stage 1

1st OverallWomen's Challenge (2.9.1)

2nd Points Classification
3rd Mountains Classification
1st Stage 1
1st Stage 10

6th Overall, Tour de l'Aude (2.9.1)

1st Stage 6

1st Australian National Road Race Championships
2nd Australian National Time Trial Championships
1st Canberra (Aus) World Cup
3rd Overall, Tour de Snowy (2.9.1)

1st Points Classification
1st Stage 2
1st Stage 6
1st Stage 7

2001
1st UCI World Points Rankings
1st Overall, UCI Women's Road World Cup
7th UCI Road World Championships – Women's time trial
1st GP des Nations Time Trial (1.9.1)
6th Tour de Suisse Féminin (2.9.1)

1st Stage 1
1st Stage 2
1st Stage 3

7th GP Suisse Féminin (Swi) World Cup
3rd Trophée International (Fra) World Cup
Thüringen-Rundfahrt (2.9.1)

1st Prologue (Zeulenroda Time Trial, 6 km)

3rd Tour of Arlington (MA)
2nd Liberty Classic (USA) World Cup
Tour de l'Aude (2.9.1)

3rd Points classification
1st Prologue
1st Stage 5
1st Stage 6

1st Xcelerate Twilight (Athens, GA)
2nd La Flèche Wallonne (Bel) World Cup
2nd BMC Software Criterium (Austin, TX)
1st Overall, Sea Otter Classic (2.9.2)

1st Stage 1
1st Stage 3
1st Stage 4

1st Hamilton City (NZl) World Cup
1st Canberra (Aus) World Cup
4th Overall, Tour de Snowy (2.9.1)

1st Points classification
1st Stage 1
1st Stage 2
1st Stage 3

2002
2nd Time Trial, Commonwealth Games

Sporting positions
Preceded by Diana Žiliūtė	World Cup Overall Points Champion; 1999	Succeeded by Diana Žiliūtė
Preceded by Diana Žiliūtė	World Cup Overall Points Champion; 2001	Succeeded by Petra Rossner
