= Geneviève Jeanson =

Canadian cyclist (born 1981)

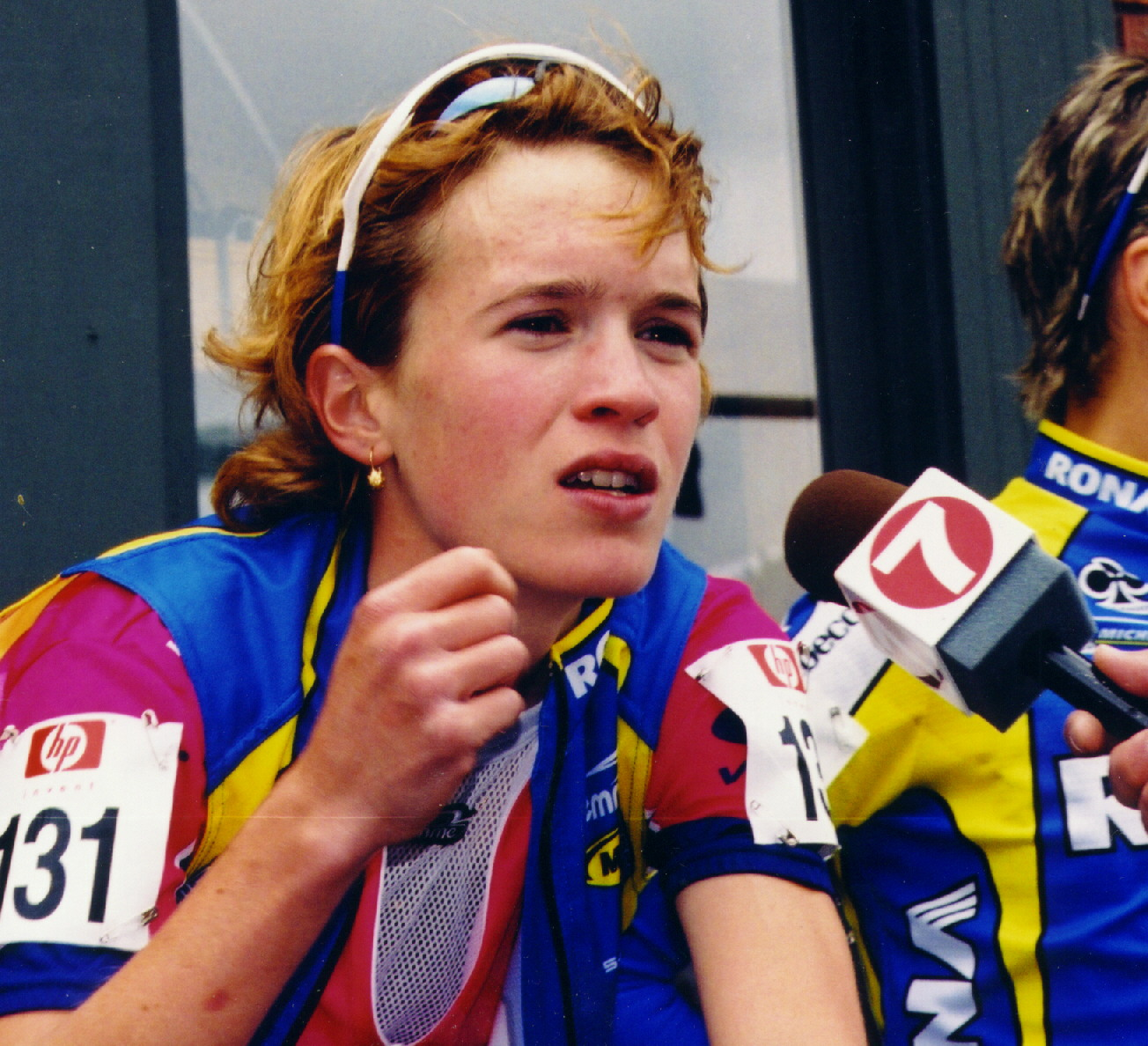
- Jeanson at the 2002 Women's Challenge

Personal information
- Full name: Geneviève Jeanson
- Born: August 29, 1981 (age 45) Saint-Hyacinthe, Quebec, Canada

Cycling career
- Sport: Cycling
- Discipline: Road
- Role: Rider

Professional team
- Rona: 2001–2004

Geneviève Jeanson (born August 29, 1981) is a former professional bicycle racer from Quebec, Canada. She won the world junior road and time trial championships in 1999 and the Tour de Snowy in 2000. Later that year she won La Flèche Wallonne World Cup race. She joined the Canadian Olympic team that year. She acknowledged in a documentary on Radio-Canada (the French-language CBC) on September 20, 2007, that she had been administered EPO more or less continuously since she was 16 years old.

After residing in Phoenix, Arizona and San Diego, California (where she studied sociology and psychology), Jeanson came back to Lachine, Quebec in 2012 to live with her once estranged parents and complete her college-level education at the Saint-Anne Collégial International. In autumn 2014, she attended Concordia University, in Montreal, where she studied neuroscience. Jeanson currently lives with her common law husband and works in the fitness industry.

== 2000 Olympic selection ==
Controversy dogged Jeanson throughout her career. Before the Olympics in 2000, she was accused of seeking special treatment by wanting an exemption from Olympic selection rules adopted by the Canadian Cycling Association. She said the procedure considered cumulative results for 1999 and 2000 but that she had raced as a junior in 1999 and could not achieve the results needed for selection. She and the Canadian Cycling Federation agreed that she would qualify for the Olympic selection race if she could finish in the top eight of two of five selected races. This she did by winning the Tour de Snowy and La Flèche Wallonne Féminine. Then, in July 2000, she qualified by finishing ahead of the other candidates in the Canadian Road Cycling Championship.

== 2000 Olympics ==
Controversy followed her to the Olympics. Towards the end of the road race, her teammate Lyne Bessette was in a break. Jeanson's detractors maintain that, on instructions from her coach, André Aubut, Jeanson helped chase the break and denied her teammate an opportunity to win a medal. Jeanson's defenders said she had ridden near the front as expected of a teammate trying to break the chase, and moved forward only to close a small gap when the break was almost caught.

== 2001 Racing ==
In 2001, she won four of five stages at the Redlands Bicycle Classic, winning overall by nearly 10 minutes, an unprecedented margin. Then, at the Tour of the Gila in early May, she won four of five stages and the overall victory, this time by an unprecedented 15 minutes. On some stages she broke away early and rode alone the rest of the way. In early June, she won the Montreal World Cup, lapping most of the field and winning by more than seven minutes.

== Doping ==
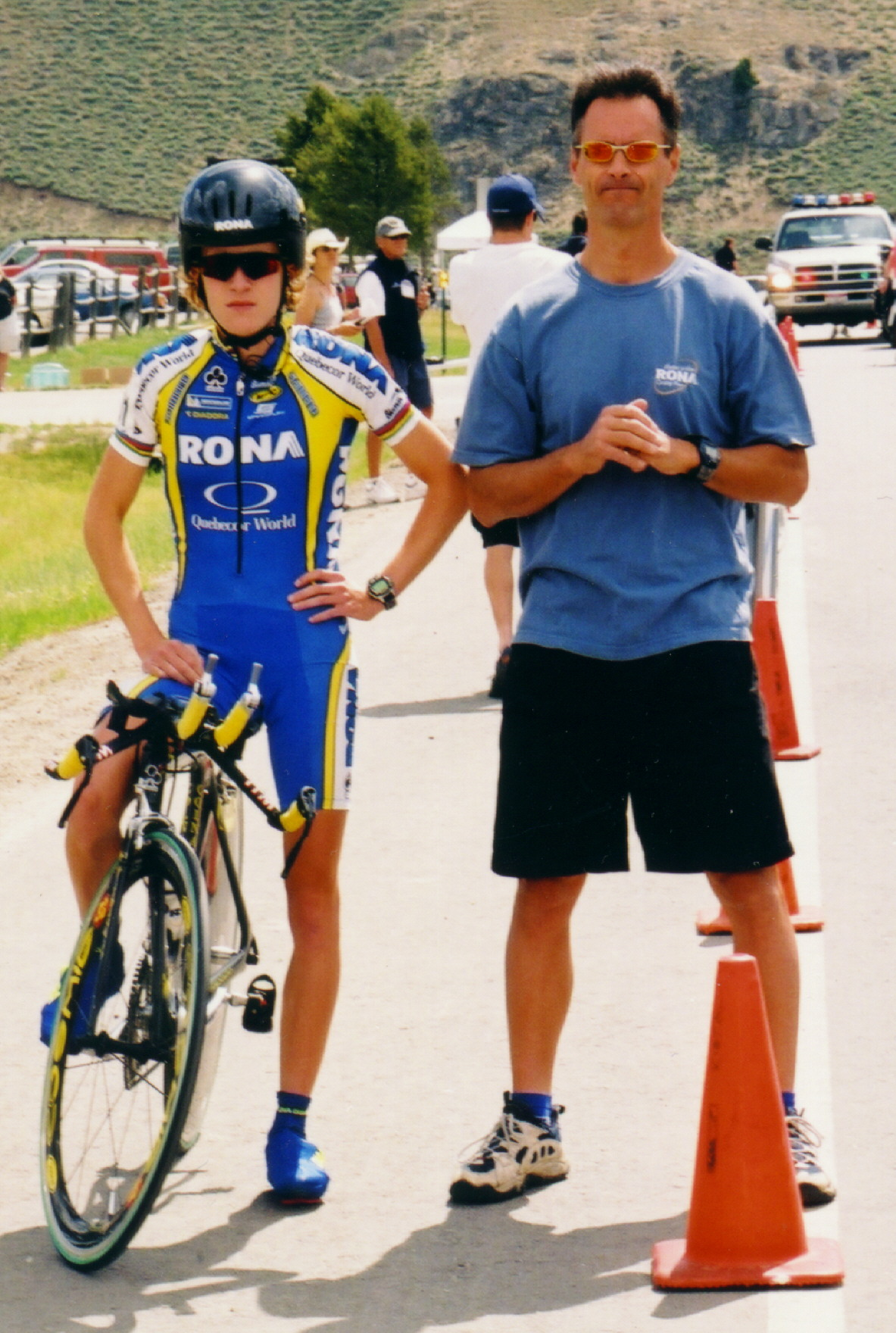
Geneviève Jeanson with her coach André Aubut

In late 2003, while with the national team preparing for the world championships in Hamilton, Ontario, Jeanson had a hematocrit level (a measure of red cells in the blood) above the limit and was not allowed to race for two weeks. She missed the championships. Jeanson blamed the finding on an altitude tent used as part of her training. Subsequent doping tests were negative.

On 25 July 2005, at the Tour de 'Toona stage race in Pennsylvania, Jeanson had an out-of-competition test. Jeanson said months later that she tested positive for EPO, a banned substance. She denied taking a banned substance but in January 2006 she announced her retirement. On November 28, 2006, the United States Anti-Doping Agency said she had accepted a two-year suspension from 25 July 2005, the day her sample was taken.

In an interview on Cyclingnews.com on 20 December 2006, Jeanson said that although she could race again from mid-July 2007, she "won't race ever again." She said she had "changed so much this past year that I have a hard time imagining who I was before." She finally admitted to doping to a French CBC journalist. Her coach André Aubut and doctor Maurice Duquette were banned for life by the Canadian Center for Ethics in Sport in 2009.

== 2014 Movie ==
The Little Queen (La Petite reine), a movie inspired by her life, was released in 2014. Jeanson's character is renamed Julie Arseneau (played by Laurence Leboeuf).

== Major results ==
1998
3rd Time Trial, UCI Junior Road World Championships
National Junior Road Championships

1st Road Race
1st Time Trial

1999
UCI Junior Road World Championships

1st Road Race
1st Time Trial

National Junior Road Championships

1st Road Race
1st Time Trial

2000
1st Overall Tour de Snowy
1st La Flèche Wallonne
2nd Time Trial, National Road CHampionships

2001
1st Overall Redlands Bicycle Classic

1st Stages 1, 3, 4 & 6

1st Overall Tour of the Gila

1st Stages 1, 2, 3 & 5

1st Overall Tour de Toona

1st Prologue & Stage 4

1st Coupe du Monde Cycliste Féminine de Montréal
National Road Championships

2nd Time Trial
3rd Road Race

2002
1st Time Trial, National Road CHampionships
1st Overall Women's Challenge

1st Stage 5

1st Prologue Tour du Grand Montréal
2nd Overall Redlands Bicycle Classic
1st Stage 1
2nd Overall Tour of the Gila

1st Stages 1, 2, 3 & 5

3rd Coupe du Monde Cycliste Féminine de Montréal

2003
National Road Championships

1st Road Race
2nd Time Trial

1st Overall Pomona Valley Stage Race

1st Stages 1 & 2

1st Overall Redlands Bicycle Classic

1st Stages 2, 3 & 5

1st Overall Sea Otter Classic

1st Stages 1 & 2

1st Overall Tour of the Gila

1st Stages 1, 2 & 3

1st Coupe du Monde Cycliste Féminine de Montréal
1st Prologue Tour du Grand Montréal
2nd Overall Tour de Toona

1st Stages 1 & 4

5th UCI Road World Championships – Women's time trial

2004
1st Coupe du Monde Cycliste Féminine de Montréal
1st Stage 4 Tour de Toona
2nd Overall Redlands Bicycle Classic

1st Prologue & Stage 1

2005
National Road Championships

1st Road Race
2nd Time Trial

1st Overall Tour de Toona
1st Coupe du Monde Cycliste Féminine de Montréal
2nd Overall Tour of the Gila

1st Stage 1

3rd Overall Valley of the Sun Stage Race

== See also ==
- List of doping cases in cycling
- List of sportspeople sanctioned for doping offences
