= Rotterdam Tour =

Dutch road bicycle race (1998 - 2006)

Race details
- Region: Rotterdam, Netherlands
- Discipline: Road
- Competition: UCI Women's Road World Cup
- Type: One-day race

History
- First edition: 1998
- Editions: 9
- Final edition: 2006
- First winner: Diana Žiliūtė (LTU)
- Most wins: Petra Rossner (GER) (3 wins)
- Final winner: Ina-Yoko Teutenberg (GER)

The Rotterdam Tour, in its first two editions called the Tour Beneden-Maas, was an elite women's professional one-day road bicycle race held between 1998 and 2006 in Rotterdam, Netherlands as part of the UCI Women's Road Cycling World Cup. For commercial reasons the race was also known as Lowland International Rotterdam Tour.

== Past winners ==
| Year | Country | Rider | Team |
|---|---|---|---|
| 1998 | Lithuania | Diana Žiliūtė | |
| 1999 | Germany | Petra Rossner | |
| 2000 | Netherlands | Chantal Beltman | |
| 2001 | Germany | Judith Arndt | |
| 2002 | Germany | Petra Rossner | |
| 2003 | Netherlands | Chantal Beltman | |
| 2004 | Germany | Petra Rossner | |
| 2005 | Germany | Ina-Yoko Teutenberg | |
| 2006 | Germany | Ina-Yoko Teutenberg | T-Mobile Professional Cycling |
