= Australia World Cup =

Bicycle racing event

Race details
- Date: February
- Region: Australia; 1998: Sydney; 1999–2001 Canberra; 2002: Snowy Mountains; 2003–2008: Geelong, Victoria
- Discipline: Road
- Competition: UCI Women's Road World Cup (1998–2008)
- Type: One-day race

History
- First edition: 1998
- Editions: 11
- Final edition: 2008
- First winner: Dede Barry (USA)
- Most wins: Anna Millward (AUS)
- Final winner: Katheryn Curi (USA)

The Australia World Cup was a women's professional road bicycle racing event held annually in Australia from 1998 to 2008 as part of the UCI Women's Road World Cup. The location of the race varied: in 1998, it was held in Sydney; from 1999 to 2001, it was held in Canberra; in 2002 it was held in the Snowy Mountains and; from 2003 to 2008 it was held in Geelong, Victoria.

The Cadel Evans Great Ocean Road Race (held from 2015 in Geelong) can be seen as a successor to the Geelong World Cup race.

== Past winners ==
| Year | Country | Rider | Team |
|---|---|---|---|
| 1998 | United States | Dede Barry | |
| 1999 | Australia | Anna Millward | |
| 2000 | Australia | Anna Millward | |
| 2001 | Australia | Anna Millward | |
| 2002 | Germany | Petra Rossner | |
| 2003 | Australia | Sara Carrigan | |
| 2004 | Australia | Oenone Wood | |
| 2005 | Australia | Rochelle Gilmore | |
| 2006 | Germany | Ina-Yoko Teutenberg | |
| 2007 | Great Britain | Nicole Cooke | |
| 2008 | United States | Katheryn Curi | |

== See also ==
- Cadel Evans Great Ocean Road Race
- Race Torquay
