= Petra Rossner =

German cyclist

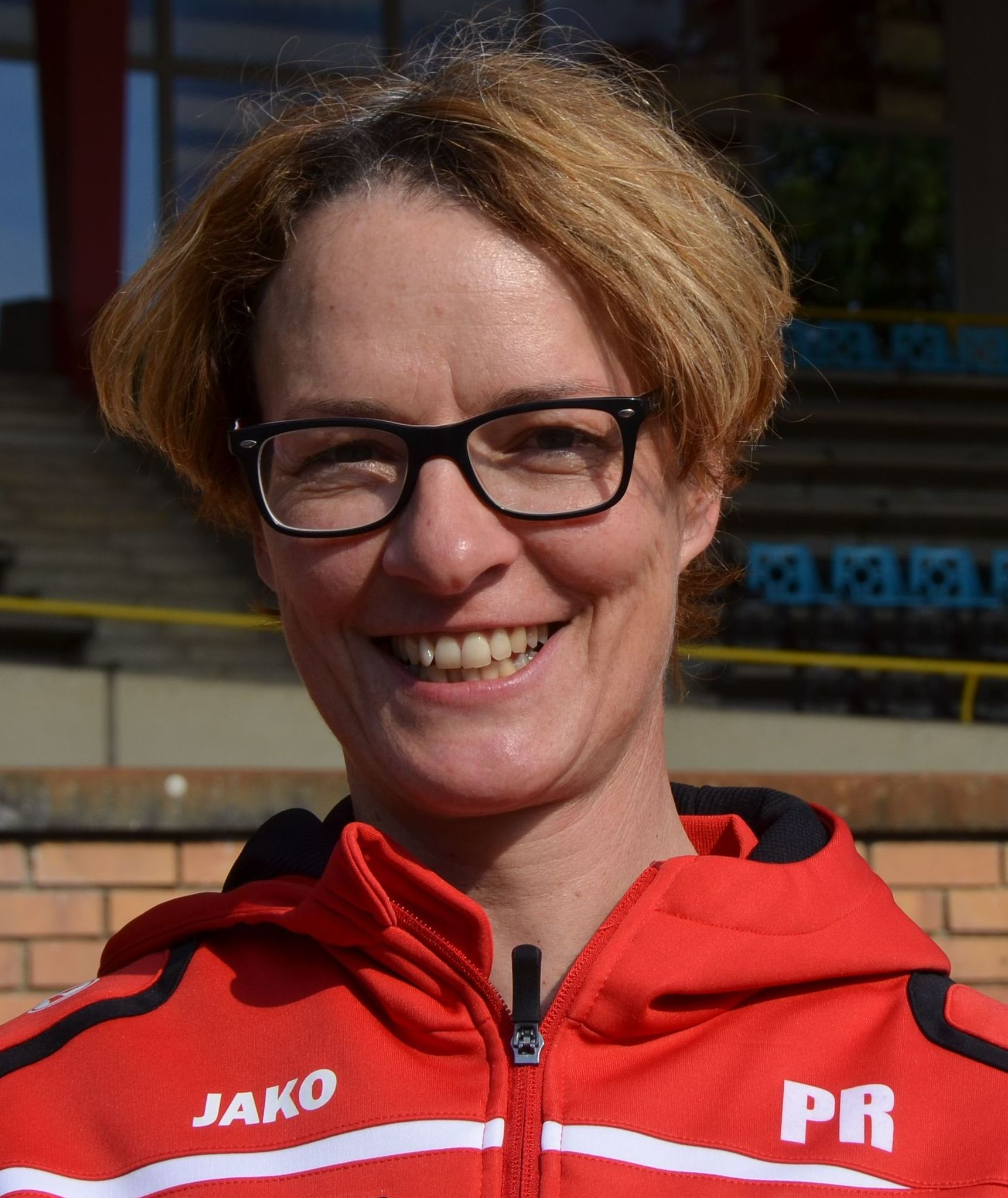
- Petra Rossner in 2014

Personal information
- Full name: Petra Rossner
- Born: 14 November 1966 (age 59) Leipzig, East Germany

Cycling career
- Sport: Cycling
- Disciplines: Road & Track
- Role: Rider
Medal record
Representing Germany
Women's track cycling
Olympic Games
Gold medal – first place	1992 Barcelona	Individual pursuit

Petra Rossner (born 14 November 1966) is a German cyclist, who won the gold medal in 3 km pursuit track cycling at the 1992 Summer Olympics in Barcelona. In the same event, she won the 1991 World Championships and finished second in 1989.

Competing in road bicycle racing, she won the World Cup in 2002. She finished second in 2004, and finished third in the 1988 Giro d'Italia Femminile. She is a seven-time winner of the Liberty Classic—winning the event in 1996, 1998, 1999, 2000, 2001, 2002 and 2004.

Rossner retired after the 2004 season.

== Private life ==
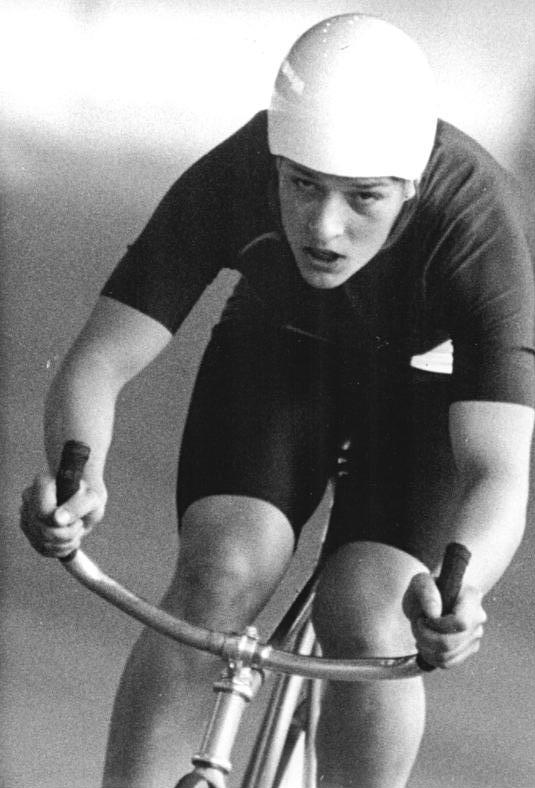
Petra Rossner in Leipzig (27 June 1987)

From 1996 on, she was living in Leipzig with her partner Judith Arndt. They have since split.

Sporting positions
Preceded by Anna Millward	World Cup Overall Points Champion; 2002	Succeeded by Nicole Cooke
