= 2005 UCI Road World Championships – Women's road race =

Women's road race.

Women's road race
2005 UCI Road World Championships
- Rainbow jersey

Race details
- Dates: 24 September 2005
- Stages: 1 in (Spain) Madrid (ESP)
- Distance: 127.8 km (79.4 mi)
- Winning time: 3h 08' 52"

Medalists
	Gold	(Germany) Regina Schleicher (GER)
	Silver	(United Kingdom) Nicole Cooke (GBR)
	Bronze	(Australia) Oenone Wood (AUS)

The women's road race of the 2005 UCI Road World Championships cycling event took place on 24 September in Madrid, Spain. The race was 127.8 km long and was won by the German rider Regina Schleicher in a bunch sprint.

== Final classification ==
Rank	Rider	Country	Time
1	Regina Schleicher	Germany	3h 08'52"
2	Nicole Cooke	United Kingdom	+ 0"
3	Oenone Wood	Australia	+ 0"
4	Dorthe Rasmussen	Denmark	+ 0"
5	Chantal Beltman	Netherlands	+ 0"
6	Giorgia Bronzini	Italy	+ 0"
7	Susanne Ljungskog	Sweden	+ 0"
8	Anita Valen	Norway	+ 0"
9	Jolanta Polikevičiūtė	Lithuania	+ 0"
10	Trixi Worrack	Germany	+ 0"
11	Diana Žiliūtė	Lithuania	+ 0"
12	Priska Doppmann	Switzerland	+ 0"
13	Mirjam Melchers-Van Poppel	Netherlands	+ 0"
14	Susan Palmer-Komar	Canada	+ 0"
15	Mette Fischer Andreasen	Denmark	+ 0"
16	Edita Pučinskaitė	Lithuania	+ 0"
17	Kristin Armstrong	United States	+ 0"
18	Christine Thorburn	United States	+ 0"
19	Nicole Brändli	Switzerland	+ 0"
20	Teodora Ruano	Spain	+ 0"
21	Erinne Willock	Canada	+ 0"
22	Małgorzata Jasińska	Poland	+ 0"
23	Joane Somarriba	Spain	+ 0"
24	Marissa van der Merwe	South Africa	+ 0"
25	Edwige Pitel	France	+ 0"
26	Magali Le Floc'h	France	+ 0"
27	Sofie Goor	Belgium	+ 0"
28	Modesta Vžesniauskaitė	Lithuania	+ 0"
29	Olivia Gollan	Australia	+ 6"
30	Zoulfia Zabirova	Kazakhstan	+ 6"
31	Alison Sydor	Canada	+ 6"
32	Rachel Heal	United Kingdom	+ 6"
33	Amber Neben	United States	+ 6"
34	Tatiana Guderzo	Italy	+ 13"
35	Judith Arndt	Germany	+ 39"
36	Theresa Senff	Germany	+ 58"
37	Olga Slyusareva	Russia	+ 1' 14"
38	Tina Pic	United States	+ 1' 14"
39	Sara Carrigan	Australia	+ 1' 14"
40	Loes Gunnewijk	Netherlands	+ 1' 14"
41	Linda Serup	Denmark	+ 1' 14"
42	Christiane Soeder	Austria	+ 1' 14"
43	Nathalie Bates	Australia	+ 1' 17"
44	Lise Christensen	Denmark	+ 1' 17"
45	Volha Hayeva	Belarus	+ 1' 17"
46	An Van Rie	Belgium	+ 1' 17"
47	Olga Zabelinskaya	Russia	+ 1' 17"
48	Anna Zugno	Italy	+ 1' 17"
49	Zita Urbonaitė	Lithuania	+ 1' 17"
50	Luise Keller	Germany	+ 1' 17"
51	Noemi Cantele	Italy	+ 1' 20"
52	Bogumiła Matusiak	Poland	+ 2' 11"
53	Kori Kelley Seehafer	United States	+ 2' 11"
54	Ludivine Henrion	Belgium	+ 2' 11"
55	Grete Treier	Estonia	+ 2' 26"
56	Svetlana Bubnenkova	Russia	+ 2' 26"
57	Élodie Touffet	France	+ 2' 26"
58	Monika Krawczyk	Poland	+ 2' 26"
59	Michelle Hyland	New Zealand	+ 2' 26"
60	Miho Oki	Japan	+ 2' 26"
61	Eneritz Echevarria	Spain	+ 2' 26"
62	Giuseppina Grassi	Mexico	+ 2' 26"
63	Cindy Pieters	Belgium	+ 2' 26"
64	Joanne Kiesanowski	New Zealand	+ 2' 26"
65	Sophie Creux	France	+ 2' 26"
66	Katheryn Curi	United States	+ 2' 26"
67	Katherine Bates	Australia	+ 2' 26"
68	Suzanne de Goede	Netherlands	+ 2' 26"
69	Marina Jaunâtre	France	+ 2' 26"
70	Toni Bradshaw	New Zealand	+ 2' 26"
71	María Isabel Moreno	Spain	+ 2' 26"
72	Karin Thürig	Switzerland	+ 2' 26"
73	Charlotte Goldsmith	United Kingdom	+ 4' 00"
74	Yulia Martissova	Russia	+ 7' 58"
75	Audrey Lemieux	Canada	+ 9' 46"
76	Nina Ovcharenco	Ukraine	+ 9' 46"
77	Chrissie Viljoen	South Africa	+ 11' 03"
78	Svitlana Semchouk	Ukraine	+ 12' 49"
79	Helen Kelly	Australia	+ 13' 03"
80	Alessandra D'Ettorre	Italy	+ 13' 03"
81	Gessica Turato	Italy	+ 13' 03"
82	Lene Byberg	Norway	+ 13' 03"
83	Adrie Visser	Netherlands	+ 13' 03"
84	Laure Werner	Belgium	+ 13' 03"
85	Luisa Tamanini	Italy	+ 13' 03"
86	Arenda Grimberg	Netherlands	+ 13' 03"
87	Clemilda Fernandes	Brazil	+ 13' 03"
88	Marta Vilajosana	Spain	+ 13' 03"
89	Andrea Graus	Austria	+ 13' 03"
90	Anna Skawinska	Poland	+ 13' 03"
91	Helen Wyman	United Kingdom	+ 13' 03"
92	Pavla Havliková	Czech Republic	+ 13' 03"
93	Amy Moore	Canada	+ 13' 03"
94	Maja Włoszczowska	Poland	+ 13' 03"
95	Magalie Finot-Laivier	France	+ 13' 03"
96	Melissa Holt	New Zealand	+ 13' 03"
97	Johanna Buick	New Zealand	+ 13' 03"
98	Laura Vangilder	United States	+ 13' 03"
99	Madeleine Sandig	Germany	+ 13' 03"
100	Emma Johansson	Sweden	+ 13' 03"
101	Maja Adamsen	Denmark	+ 13' 03"
102	Sarah Grab	Switzerland	+ 13' 42"
103	Janildes Fernandes	Brazil	+ 13' 42"
104	Felicia Greer	Canada	+ 13' 42"
105	Paulina Brzeźna	Poland	+ 13' 42"
106	Miyoko Karami	Japan	+ 19' 40"
107	Elena Kuchinskaya	Russia	+ 19' 40"

=== Did not finish ===
25 riders failed to finish the race.

Rider	Country
Ina-Yoko Teutenberg	Germany
Annette Beutler	Switzerland
Bettina Kühn	Switzerland
Yulia Razenkova	Russia
Erika Vilūnaitė	Lithuania
Maria Cagigas	Spain
Tamara Boyd	New Zealand
Catherine Hare	United Kingdom
Emma Pooley	United Kingdom
Katleen Vermeiren	Belgium
Veronica Andrèasson	Sweden
Monica Holler	Sweden
Madeleine Lindberg	Sweden
Kateryna Krasova	Ukraine
Iryna Shpylova	Ukraine
Bernadette Schober	Austria
Isabella Wieser	Austria
Uênia Fernandes de Souza	Brazil
Verónica Leal	Mexico
Veronika Sharametsyeva	Belarus
Siobhan Dervan	Ireland
Tiina Nieminen	Finland
Camila Ayala	Argentina
Agnes Eppers	Bolivia
