= 2007 UCI Road World Championships – Women's road race =

Women's road race
2007 UCI Road World Championships
- Rainbow jersey

Race details
- Dates: 29 September 2007
- Stages: 1 in (Germany) Stuttgart (GER)
- Distance: 133.7 km (83.1 mi)
- Winning time: 3h 46' 34"

Medalists
| | Gold | (Italy) Marta Bastianelli (ITA) |
| | Silver | (Netherlands) Marianne Vos (NED) |
| | Bronze | (Italy) Giorgia Bronzini (ITA) |

The 2007 UCI Road World Championships – Women's Road Race took place on September 29, 2007 around the German city of Stuttgart. The race started at 9:00.

The race was won by Italian Marta Bastianelli, who broke away 15 km from the finish and held a gap over the chasing group. Last year's champion Marianne Vos of the Netherlands took silver with Giorgia Bronzini of Italy taking bronze to cap a dominant performance by the Italian team. It was Bastianelli's first victory of the season.

== Race ==
Although the sun was out at the start of the race, the road were still wet and treacherous. The first victim of the conditions was Toni Bradshaw of New Zealand, this was the first of many early crashes, which included Zulfiya Zabirova.

The race started at a gentle pace but the climbs immediately stretched out the field. Rosario Rodriguez Maria of Spain attacked but was not successful, so the front of the peloton remained quiet. The first lap was completed in just over 33 minutes, with an average speed of 34.709 km/h.

The second lap was equally uneventful, except for Christine Thorburn of the United States who suffered a slight mechanical. Her chain came off on an uphill section, bringing her to a standstill and impeding the progress of several other riders. The second lap was completed in 33'07", an average speed of 34.604 km/h.

The Brazilian Clemilda Fernandes Silva attempted to attack on the third lap, but was marked by the strongest teams. The peloton completed the third lap marginally slower, in 33'32" (average speed 34.494 km/h).

The Italian rider Tatiana Guderzo launched an attack on lap four. Katheryn Curi (USA), Oxana Kozonchuk (Russia) and Hanka Kupfernagel (Germany) responded immediately. Kupfernagel marked attacks throughout the race, attempting to ensure a sprint finish for teammate Judith Arndt, Kupfernagel had already won a gold medal in the time trial. Trixi Worrack was the second rider to drop her chain on a climb, but a passing teammate gave her a little push to get her going again. Lap four was completed nearly a minute faster than the previous lap, with an average speed 34.66 km/h.

It was Guderzo who attacked again on the fifth lap, with the first serious attack of the race. She quickly built 10 second lead, which was then extended to 20 seconds. Other riders began to attack including Spaniards, Australians and Swiss riders, but the German team was trying to keep the race under control and no others were able to get away. Guderzo was within the bunch's sights when an advertising barrier was blown over, bringing down several riders, including Priska Doppmann, Maribel Moreno Allue, Regina Bruins and Edita Pučinskaitė. The peloton's rhythm was sufficiently disrupted so that Guderzo was once more able to increase her lead.

With two laps to go, Guderzo had a second lead, but it was never more than 25 seconds. Noemi Cantele was 43 seconds behind having been caught up in the crash, but with the help of her team she quickly caught up. It was the turn of the American team set the pace, as Amber Neben attacked, but Cantele went with her, driving the break as they caught and passed Guderzo, gaining 25 seconds on the bunch. But the gap began to fall as the bunch worked hard up the climbs, catching Neben and Cantele two kilometres before the start of the final lap. This penultimae lap had been the fastest so far, completed in 31'37", an average speed of 36.246 km/h.

Defending champion Marianne Vos and Cantele attacked on the first climb of the final lap, and built small lead. It was Marta Bastianelli's turn to attack from the front of the bunch, she did so strongly, taking advantage of other riders' hesitation. A group of around a dozen riders was able to catch back up to the second group, which consisted of seven riders.

Bastianelli increased her lead to 20 seconds, and despite a brief problem with her chain, she was soon approximately 15 seconds ahead of the small chase group made up of 22 riders. She had wanted to avoid sprinting head to head with Marianne Vos; her tactics worked as she crossed the line first. Vos came in to take the bunch sprint and second position, just in front of Giorgia Bronzini.

== Final classification ==
September 29, 2007: Stuttgart, 133.7 km

| Rank | Rider | Country | Time |
|---|---|---|---|
| 1 | Marta Bastianelli | Italy | 3h 46'34" |
| 1 | Marianne Vos | Netherlands | + 6" |
| 1 | Giorgia Bronzini | Italy | + 6" |
| 4 | Svetlana Bubnenkova | Russia | + 6" |
| 5 | Noemi Cantele | Italy | + 6" |
| 6 | Emma Johansson | Sweden | + 6" |
| 7 | Marina Jaunâtre | France | + 6" |
| 8 | Oenone Wood | Australia | + 6" |
| 9 | Alex Wrubleski | Canada | + 6" |
| 10 | Emma Pooley | United Kingdom | + 6" |
| 11 | Maryline Salvetat | France | + 6" |
| 12 | Lieselot Decroix | Belgium | + 6" |
| 13 | Kristin Armstrong | United States | + 6" |
| 14 | María Isabel Moreno | Spain | + 6" |
| 15 | Joanne Kiesanowski | New Zealand | + 6" |
| 16 | Amber Neben | United States | + 6" |
| 17 | Erinne Willock | Canada | + 6" |
| 18 | Trixi Worrack | Germany | + 14" |
| 19 | Sereina Trachsel | Switzerland | + 53" |
| 20 | Chantal Beltman | Netherlands | + 54" |
| 21 | Judith Arndt | Germany | + 58" |
| 22 | Edwige Pitel | France | + 1' 06" |
| 23 | Jeannie Longo-Ciprelli | France | + 1' 06" |
| 24 | Rasa Polikevičiūtė | Lithuania | + 1' 06" |
| 25 | Anita Valen | Norway | + 1' 09" |
| 26 | Priska Doppmann | Switzerland | + 1' 09" |
| 27 | Maja Adamsen | Denmark | + 1' 09" |
| 28 | Mirjam Melchers-Van Poppel | Netherlands | + 1' 09" |
| 29 | Karen Steurs | Belgium | + 1' 09" |
| 30 | Catherine Hare | United Kingdom | + 1' 09" |
| 31 | Clemilda Fernandes | Brazil | + 1' 09" |
| 32 | Leigh Hobson | Canada | + 1' 09" |
| 33 | Yuliya Martisova | Russia | + 1' 09" |
| 34 | Lang Meng | China | + 1' 09" |
| 35 | Gao Min | China | + 1' 09" |
| 36 | Tereza Huříková | Czech Republic | + 1' 09" |
| 37 | Wang Fei | China | + 1' 09" |
| 38 | Élodie Touffet | France | + 1' 09" |
| 39 | Lorian Graham | Australia | + 1' 09" |
| 40 | Grete Treier | Estonia | + 1' 09" |
| 41 | Andrea Graus | Austria | + 1' 09" |
| 42 | Zulfiya Zabirova | Kazakhstan | + 1' 09" |
| 43 | Verónica Leal | Mexico | + 1' 09" |
| 44 | Christine Thorburn | United States | + 1' 09" |
| 45 | Mara Abbott | United States | + 1' 09" |
| 46 | Claudia Häusler | Germany | + 2' 44" |
| 47 | An Van Rie | Belgium | + 2' 44" |
| 48 | Lohse Rasmussen Dorte | Denmark | + 2' 44" |
| 49 | Sufen Ma | China | + 2' 44" |
| 50 | Suzanne de Goede | Netherlands | + 2' 44" |
| 51 | Andrea Bosman | Netherlands | + 2' 44" |
| 52 | Luisa Tamanini | Italy | + 2' 44" |
| 53 | Karin Thürig | Switzerland | + 2' 44" |
| 54 | Diana Žiliūtė | Lithuania | + 2' 44" |
| 55 | Hanka Kupfernagel | Germany | + 2' 44" |
| 56 | Nikki Egyed | Australia | + 3' 11" |
| 57 | Rachel Heal | United Kingdom | + 5' 36" |
| 58 | Alyona Andruk | Ukraine | + 5' 43" |
| 59 | Sofie Goor | Belgium | + 6' 01" |
| 60 | Edita Pučinskaitė | Lithuania | + 10' 39" |
| 61 | Marta Vila Josana | Spain | + 10' 39" |
| 62 | Jolanta Polikevičiūtė | Lithuania | + 10' 39" |
| 63 | Tatsiana Sharakova | Belarus | + 10' 39" |
| 64 | Rosane Kirch | Brazil | + 10' 39" |
| 65 | Oksana Kashchyshyna | Ukraine | + 12' 04" |
| 66 | Oxana Kozonchuk | Russia | + 12' 08" |
| 67 | Siobhan Dervan | Ireland | + 12' 38" |
| 68 | Grace Verbeke | Belgium | + 12' 38" |
| 69 | Jennifer Hohl | Switzerland | + 12' 40" |
| 70 | Patricia Schwager | Switzerland | + 12' 40" |
| 71 | Monika Schachl | Austria | + 12' 40" |
| 72 | Eneritz Iturriagaechevarria Mazaga | Spain | + 12' 40" |
| 73 | Rosara Joseph | New Zealand | + 14' 24" |
| 74 | Daniela Pintarelli | Austria | + 14' 24" |
| 75 | Sylwia Kapusta | Poland | + 16' 56" |
| 76 | Giuseppina Grassi Herrera | Mexico | + 16' 56" |
| 77 | Michelle Hyland | New Zealand | + 16' 56" |
| 78 | Rasa Leleivytė | Lithuania | + 16' 56" |
| 79 | Veronika Sprügl | Austria | + 16' 56" |
| 80 | Yolandi Du Toit | South Africa | + 16' 56" |
| 81 | Ana Madriñan Villegas | Colombia | + 20' 59" |

=== Did not finish ===
61 riders failed to finish the race.

| Rider | Country |
|---|---|
| Olivia Gollan | Australia |
| Emma Rickards | Australia |
| Eva Lutz | Germany |
| Tatiana Guderzo | Italy |
| Monia Baccaille | Italy |
| Irene van den Broek | Netherlands |
| Luise Keller | Germany |
| Regina Bruins | Netherlands |
| Ludivine Henrion | Belgium |
| Christine Majerus | Luxembourg |
| Miho Oki | Japan |
| Aleksandra Wnuczek | Poland |
| Alena Konečná | Czech Republic |
| Kateryna Krasova | Ukraine |
| Małgorzata Jasińska | Poland |
| Christiane Soeder | Austria |
| Katheryn Curi | United States |
| Lauren Franges | United States |
| Anne Samplonius | Canada |
| Annette Beutler | Switzerland |
| Carissa Wilkes | New Zealand |
| Magali Mocquery | France |
| Meifang Li | China |
| Sara Carrigan | Australia |
| Natalia Boyarskaya | Russia |
| Sara Mustonen | Sweden |
| Daiva Tušlaitė | Lithuania |
| Rosario Rodriguez Maria | Spain |
| Iosune Murillo Elkano | Spain |
| Jarmila Machačová | Czech Republic |
| Li Liu Yong | China |
| Marissa van der Merwe | South Africa |
| Laura Lepasalu | Estonia |
| Aurelie Halbwachs | Mauritius |
| Lyubov Dombitskaya | Kazakhstan |
| Olessya Atrashkevich | Kazakhstan |
| Chapookam Monrudee | Thailand |
| Nontasin Chanpeng | Thailand |
| Viena Balen | Croatia |
| Martina Růžičková | Czech Republic |
| Elizabeth Armitstead | United Kingdom |
| Evelyn García | El Salvador |
| Elena Novikova | Russia |
| Yelyzaveta Bochkaryova | Ukraine |
| Tatiana Antoshina | Russia |
| Monika Grzebinoga | Poland |
| Hye Lee Min | South Korea |
| Trine Schmidt | Denmark |
| Anastasia Pastourmatzi | Greece |
| Thatsani Wichana | Thailand |
| Helen Wyman | United Kingdom |
| Paulina Brzeźna | Poland |
| Dragana Kovačević | Serbia |
| Tanja Slater | United Kingdom |
| Susanne Ljungskog | Sweden |
| Arantzazu Azpiroz | Spain |
| Tina Mayolo Pic | United States |
| Janildes Fernandes | Brazil |
| Uênia Fernandes | Brazil |
| Nathalie Lamborelle | Luxembourg |
| Toni Bradshaw | New Zealand |
