= 2006 UCI Road World Championships – Women's road race =

Women's road race
2006 UCI Road World Championships
- Rainbow jersey

Race details
- Dates: 23 September 2006
- Stages: 1 in (Austria) Salzburg (AUT)
- Distance: 132.6 km (82.4 mi)
- Winning time: 3h 20' 26"

Medalists
| | Gold | (Netherlands) Marianne Vos (NED) |
| | Silver | (Germany) Trixi Worrack (GER) |
| | Bronze | (United Kingdom) Nicole Cooke (GBR) |

The Women's road race of the 2006 UCI Road World Championships cycling event took place on 23 September in Salzburg, Austria. The race was 132.6 km long.

Anne Samplonius (Canada) and Natalia Boyarskaya (Russia) made an early break, attacking on the climb on the second lap, they held a small gap until two laps to go. Nicole Cooke (Great Britain) attacked up the steep Gschaiderberg climb on the penultimate lap, this caused huge splits in the main field. Several others riders eventually joined Cooke to form a breakaway group which included the Swiss riders Nicole Brändli, Priska Doppmann and Annette Beutler; German riders Judith Arndt, Theresa Senff and Trixi Worrack; Andrea Graus and Christiane Soeder of Austria, Svetlana Bubnenkova (Russia), Oenone Wood (Australia) and Amber Neben (United States) and Marianne Vos (The Netherlands). Vos, Cooke and Brändli attacked several times during the final lap, but the race finished with Vos taking the victory in a small bunch sprint.

== Final classification ==
| Rank | Rider | Country | Time |
|---|---|---|---|
| 1 | Marianne Vos | Netherlands | 3h 20' 26" |
| 2 | Trixi Worrack | Germany | + 0" |
| 3 | Nicole Cooke | United Kingdom | + 0" |
| 4 | Noemi Cantele | Italy | + 0" |
| 5 | Priska Doppmann | Switzerland | + 0" |
| 6 | Oenone Wood | Australia | + 0" |
| 7 | Annette Beutler | Switzerland | + 0" |
| 8 | Nicole Brändli | Switzerland | + 0" |
| 9 | Svetlana Bubnenkova | Russia | + 0" |
| 10 | Andrea Graus | Austria | + 0" |
| 11 | Christiane Soeder | Austria | + 0" |
| 12 | Amber Neben | United States | + 0" |
| 13 | Chantal Beltman | Netherlands | + 0" |
| 14 | Judith Arndt | Germany | + 0" |
| 15 | Theresa Senff | Germany | + 6" |
| 16 | Giorgia Bronzini | Italy | + 2' 07" |
| 17 | Mette Fischer Andreasen | Denmark | + 2' 07" |
| 18 | Lada Kozlíková | Czech Republic | + 2' 07" |
| 19 | Monia Baccaille | Italy | + 2' 07" |
| 20 | Grete Treier | Estonia | + 2' 07" |
| 21 | Zulfiya Zabirova | Kazakhstan | + 2' 07" |
| 22 | Loes Gunnewijk | Netherlands | + 2' 07" |
| 23 | Alex Wrubleski | Canada | + 2' 07" |
| 24 | Evy Van Damme | Belgium | + 2' 07" |
| 25 | Diana Žiliūtė | Lithuania | + 2' 07" |
| 26 | Marina Jaunâtre | France | + 2' 07" |
| 27 | Yulia Arustamova | Russia | + 2' 07" |
| 28 | Clemilda Fernandes | Brazil | + 2' 07" |
| 29 | Adrie Visser | Netherlands | + 2' 07" |
| 30 | Mayuko Hagiwara | Japan | + 2' 07" |
| 31 | Edita Pučinskaitė | Lithuania | + 2' 07" |
| 32 | Tetyana Styazhkina | Ukraine | + 2' 07" |
| 33 | Linda Villumsen | Denmark | + 2' 07" |
| 34 | Christine Thorburn | United States | + 2' 07" |
| 35 | Joanne Kiesanowski | New Zealand | + 2' 07" |
| 36 | Sophie Creux | France | + 2' 07" |
| 37 | Erinne Willock | Canada | + 2' 07" |
| 38 | Kristin Armstrong | United States | + 2' 07" |
| 39 | Tatiana Guderzo | Italy | + 2' 07" |
| 40 | Claudia Häusler | Germany | + 2' 07" |
| 41 | Edwige Pitel | France | + 2' 07" |
| 42 | Lorenza Morfín | Mexico | + 2' 07" |
| 43 | Maryline Salvetat | France | + 2' 07" |
| 44 | Susanne Ljungskog | Sweden | + 2' 07" |
| 45 | Dorthe Rasmussen | Denmark | + 5' 55" |
| 46 | Daiva Tušlaitė | Lithuania | + 5' 55" |
| 47 | Liu Yongli | China | + 5' 55" |
| 48 | Rasa Polikevičiūtė | Lithuania | + 5' 55" |
| 49 | Eneritz Iturriagaechevarria | Spain | + 5' 55" |
| 50 | Daniela Pintarelli | Austria | + 5' 55" |
| 51 | Suzanne de Goede | Netherlands | + 5' 55" |
| 52 | Lynette Jansen | South Africa | + 5' 55" |
| 53 | Anne Samplonius | Canada | + 5' 55" |
| 54 | Anke Erlank | South Africa | + 5' 55" |
| 55 | Chrissie Viljoen | South Africa | + 5' 55" |
| 56 | Paulina Brzeźna | Poland | + 5' 55" |
| 57 | Sharon Vandromme | Belgium | + 5' 55" |
| 58 | Trine Schmidt | Denmark | + 5' 55" |
| 59 | Zita Urbonaitė | Lithuania | + 5' 55" |
| 60 | Ludivine Henrion | Belgium | + 5' 55" |
| 61 | Laure Werner | Belgium | + 5' 55" |
| 62 | Yolandi Du Toit | South Africa | + 5' 55" |
| 63 | Emma Johansson | Sweden | + 5' 55" |
| 64 | Emma Rickards | Australia | + 5' 55" |
| 65 | Yevheniya Vysotska | Ukraine | + 5' 55" |
| 66 | Siobhan Dervan | Ireland | + 5' 55" |
| 67 | Veronica Andrèasson | Sweden | + 5' 55" |
| 68 | Tatiana Shishkova | Russia | + 5' 55" |
| 69 | Eva Hubená | Czech Republic | + 5' 55" |
| 70 | An Van Rie | Belgium | + 5' 55" |
| 71 | Anriette Schoeman | South Africa | + 5' 55" |
| 72 | Iris Slappendel | Netherlands | + 5' 55" |
| 73 | Magali Le Floc'h | France | + 5' 55" |
| 74 | Vera Carrara | Italy | + 5' 55" |
| 75 | Susan Palmer-Komar | Canada | + 5' 55" |
| 76 | María Isabel Moreno | Spain | + 5' 55" |
| 77 | Fabiana Luperini | Italy | + 5' 55" |
| 78 | Monika Schachl | Austria | + 12' 26" |
| 79 | Yelyzaveta Bochkaryova | Ukraine | + 12' 26" |
| 80 | Patricia Schwager | Switzerland | + 12' 26" |
| 81 | Lise Christensen | Denmark | + 12' 26" |
| 82 | Toni Bradshaw | New Zealand | + 16' 58" |
| 83 | Li Meifang | China | + 22' 57" |
| 84 | Bernadette Schober | Austria | + 22' 57" |
| 85 | Karolina Konieczna | Poland | + 22' 57" |
| 86 | Linn Torp | Norway | + 24' 06" |
| 87 | Martina Růžičková | Czech Republic | + 24' 06" |
| 88 | Uênia Fernandes de Souza | Brazil | + 24' 06" |
| 89 | Kirsten Wild | Netherlands | + 24' 06" |
| 90 | Leigh Hobson | Canada | + 24' 06" |
| 91 | Pavla Havliková | Czech Republic | + 24' 06" |
| 92 | Yulia Blindyuk | Russia | + 24' 06" |
| 93 | Valentina Gavrilova | Russia | + 24' 06" |
| 94 | Iosune Murillo Elkano | Spain | + 24' 06" |

=== Did not finish ===
41 riders failed to finish the race. Giusepina Grassi Herrera of Mexico did not start the race.

| Rider | Country |
|---|---|
| Kim Anderson | United States |
| Ina-Yoko Teutenberg | Germany |
| Olivia Gollan | Australia |
| Nathalie Bates | Australia |
| Kimberly Baldwin | United States |
| Rachel Heal | United Kingdom |
| Isabella Wieser | Austria |
| Urtė Juodvalkytė | Lithuania |
| Monica Holler | Sweden |
| Jennifer Hohl | Switzerland |
| Sofie Goor | Belgium |
| Jeannie Longo-Ciprelli | France |
| Madeleine Sandig | Germany |
| Natalia Boyarskaya | Russia |
| Tina Pic | United States |
| Katherine Bates | Australia |
| Naiara Telletxea | Spain |
| Miho Oki | Japan |
| Sabrina Emmasi | Switzerland |
| Marissa van der Merwe | South Africa |
| Oksana Kashchyshyna | Ukraine |
| Kateryna Krasova | Ukraine |
| Liping Zhang | China |
| Verónica Leal | Mexico |
| Tanja Slater | United Kingdom |
| Monika Krawczyk | Poland |
| Amy Moore | Canada |
| Helen Wyman | United Kingdom |
| Marie Lindberg | Sweden |
| Marta Vilajosana | Spain |
| Zhao Na | China |
| Monika Grzebinoga | Poland |
| Karin Aune | Sweden |
| Noelia Fernández | Argentina |
| Helen Kelly | Australia |
| Małgorzata Jasińska | Poland |
| Mónika Király | Hungary |
| Regina Schleicher | Germany |
| Janildes Fernandes | Brazil |
| Evelyn García | El Salvador |
| Ana Belen Garcia Antequera | Spain |

== See also ==
- 2006 World University Cycling Championship – Women's road race
