= 2008 UCI Road World Championships – Women's road race =

Women's road race
2008 UCI Road World Championships
- Rainbow jersey

Race details
- Dates: 27 September 2008
- Stages: 1 in (Italy) Varese (ITA)
- Distance: 138.8 km (86.2 mi)
- Winning time: 3h 42' 11"

Medalists
	Gold	(United Kingdom) Nicole Cooke (GBR)
	Silver	(Netherlands) Marianne Vos (NED)
	Bronze	(Germany) Judith Arndt (GER)

The women's road race of the 2008 UCI Road World Championships cycling event took place on 27 September in Varese, Italy. The course comprised eight laps around a 17.35-kilometre route, making a total distance of 138.8 km. Each lap featured two ascents: the first at Montello (6.5% gradient for 1.15 kilometres); and the second at Ronchi, Gallarate (4.5% for 3.13 kilometres). The race included a total of 1,937 metres of climbing.

Pre-race favourites included Varese local rider Noemi Cantele and her teammates Tatiana Guderzo and Giorgia Bronzini, Marianne Vos of the Netherlands, Judith Arndt of Germany (champion in 2004), reigning Olympic champion Nicole Cooke and silver medallist Emma Johansson. Notably missing from the start list was Marta Bastianelli, reigning champion from 2007, who was awaiting a verdict on a non-negative drug test result in July 2008.

The race was won by Great Britain's Nicole Cooke, with Marianne Vos and Judith Arndt finishing with the same time, second and third respectively. Cooke was the first British woman to win the race since Mandy Jones in 1982.

== The race ==
Not long after the race began, a Swedish rider brought down the front row of the peloton when her tyres slipped on some painted letters on the road. Christine Thorburn was also brought down in a crash, when she was squeezed up against a fence. Although she was not severely injured and did attempt to chase the bunch, she failed to make contact and did not finish.

A group of thirteen riders soon broke away from the main group, driven mainly by the American Kristin Armstrong. They gained 25 seconds on the field but were pulled back by the Dutch and British teams with one lap to go. As soon as the break was caught, Marianne Vos launched a counter-attack on the Montello climb, Nicole Cooke, Judith Arndt, Trixi Worrack and Emma Johansson, and Susanne Ljungskog joined her in what was to become the winning break. Ljungskog's chances ended when she punctured, leaving five in the break.

Worrack and Vos attacked on the final hill, but were brought back to the break with 2 km to go. The race finished with a sprint, Vos took the lead before being overtaken by Cooke just before the finish line. Arndt struggled to match their speed in the sprint, she was nearly caught out by a late surge by Johansson, but eventually crossed the line in third place.

== Final classification ==
Rank	Rider	Country	Time
1	Nicole Cooke	United Kingdom	3h 42'11"
1	Marianne Vos	Netherlands	+ 0"
1	Judith Arndt	Germany	+ 0"
4	Emma Johansson	Sweden	+ 5"
5	Trixi Worrack	Germany	+ 11"
6	Diana Žiliūtė	Lithuania	+ 1' 47"
7	Marta Vilajosana Andreu	Spain	+ 1' 47"
8	Joanne Kiesanowski	New Zealand	+ 1' 47"
9	Alex Wrubleski	Canada	+ 1' 47"
10	Yuliya Martisova	Russia	+ 1' 47"
11	Claudia Häusler	Germany	+ 1' 47"
12	Chantal Beltman	Netherlands	+ 1' 47"
13	Linda Villumsen	Denmark	+ 1' 47"
14	Giorgia Bronzini	Italy	+ 1' 47"
15	Nikki Egyed	Australia	+ 1' 47"
16	Grace Verbeke	Belgium	+ 1' 47"
17	Jeannie Longo-Ciprelli	France	+ 1' 47"
18	Edita Pučinskaitė	Lithuania	+ 1' 47"
19	Christiane Soeder	Austria	+ 1' 47"
20	Maryline Salvetat	France	+ 1' 47"
21	Kaytee Boyd	New Zealand	+ 1' 47"
22	Amber Neben	United States	+ 1' 47"
23	Małgorzata Jasińska	Poland	+ 1' 47"
24	Siobhan Dervan	Ireland	+ 1' 47"
25	Laura Lorenza Morfin Macouzet	Mexico	+ 1' 47"
26	Monia Baccaille	Italy	+ 1' 47"
27	Rasa Polikevičiūtė	Lithuania	+ 1' 47"
28	Sharon Laws	United Kingdom	+ 1' 47"
29	Tatiana Guderzo	Italy	+ 1' 47"
30	Mirjam Melchers-Van Poppel	Netherlands	+ 1' 47"
31	Susanne Ljungskog	Sweden	+ 1' 47"
32	Modesta Vžesniauskaitė	Lithuania	+ 1' 56"
33	Natalia Boyarskaya	Russia	+ 1' 56"
34	Jolanta Polikevičiūtė	Lithuania	+ 1' 56"
35	Emma Pooley	United Kingdom	+ 1' 56"
36	Anna Sanchis Chafer	Spain	+ 1' 56"
37	Noemi Cantele	Italy	+ 1' 59"
38	Zinaida Stahurskaya	Belarus	+ 4' 54"
39	Kristin Armstrong	United States	+ 4' 56"
40	Alexandra Burchenkova	Russia	+ 5' 24"
41	Elizabeth Armitstead	United Kingdom	+ 5' 24"
42	Rosane Kirch	Brazil	+ 6' 08"
43	Grete Treier	Estonia	+ 6' 11"
44	Maja Adamsen	Denmark	+ 6' 11"
45	Oxana Kozonchuk	Russia	+ 6' 11"
46	Clemilda Fernandes Silva	Brazil	+ 6' 11"
47	Karine Gautard	France	+ 6' 11"
48	Erinne Willock	Canada	+ 6' 11"
49	Lieselot Decroix	Belgium	+ 6' 11"
50	Sereina Trachsel	Switzerland	+ 6' 11"
51	Martina Růžičková	Czech Republic	+ 6' 11"
52	Eneritz Iturriaga Echevarria	Spain	+ 6' 11"
53	Vicki Whitelaw	Australia	+ 6' 11"
54	Edwige Pitel	France	+ 6' 11"
55	Paulina Brzeźna	Poland	+ 6' 11"
56	Marissa van der Merwe	South Africa	+ 6' 11"
57	Monika Grzebinoga	Poland	+ 6' 11"
58	Liesbet De Vocht	Belgium	+ 6' 11"
59	Daniela Pintarelli	Austria	+ 6' 11"
60	Julie Beveridge	Canada	+ 6' 11"
61	Jessica Allen	United Kingdom	+ 6' 11"
62	Suzanne de Goede	Netherlands	+ 6' 11"
63	Oenone Wood	Australia	+ 6' 11"
64	Carla Ryan	Australia	+ 6' 11"
65	Tatiana Antoshina	Russia	+ 6' 11"
66	Patricia Schwager	Switzerland	+ 6' 11"
67	Kori Kelley Seehafer	United States	+ 6' 11"
68	Monika Schachl	Austria	+ 6' 16"
69	Rosara Joseph	New Zealand	+ 6' 16"
70	Fabiana Luperini	Italy	+ 6' 16"
71	Charlotte Becker	Germany	+ 6' 16"
72	Luise Keller	Germany	+ 6' 16"
73	Oksana Kashchyshyna	Ukraine	+ 9' 22"
74	Verónica Leal Balderas	Mexico	+ 9' 22"
75	Sylwia Kapusta	Poland	+ 12' 14"
76	Anriette Schoeman	South Africa	+ 13' 17"
77	Sigrid Corneo	Slovenia	+ 13' 17"
78	Felicia Greer	Canada	+ 13' 17"
79	Jennifer Hohl	Switzerland	+ 13' 17"
80	Élodie Touffet	France	+ 13' 17"
81	Rasa Leleivytė	Lithuania	+ 13' 17"
82	Miho Oki	Japan	+ 17' 50"
83	Yevheniya Vysotska	Ukraine	+ 20' 20"
84	Laure Werner	Belgium	+ 22' 02"
85	Mirjam Hauser-Senn	Switzerland	+ 22' 02"
86	Julie Krasniak	France	+ 27' 51"
87	Chrissie Viljoen	South Africa	+ 28' 39"
88	Lynette Burger	South Africa	+ 28' 39"
89	Magdalena Zamolska	Poland	+ 28' 39"
90	Inga Čilvinaitė	Lithuania	+ 28' 39"
91	Alyona Andruk	Ukraine	+ 28' 39"

=== Did not finish ===
45 riders failed to finish the race. Mayuko Hagiwara of Japan was disqualified, and Grassi Herrera of Mexico did not start the race.

Rider	Country
Karin Thürig	Switzerland
Anne Samplonius	Canada
Irene van den Broek	Netherlands
Christine Thorburn	United States
Angela Brodtka	Germany
Rochelle Gilmore	Australia
Anita Valen De Vries	Norway
Hanna Taukanitsa	Belarus
Yuka Yamashima	Japan
Maria Briceno Jimenez	Venezuela
Eva Lechner	Italy
Brooke Miller	United States
Emma Rickards	Australia
Katheryn Curi Mattis	United States
Andrea Thürig	Switzerland
Iosune Murillo Elkano	Spain
Regina Bruins	Netherlands
Jarmila Machačová	Czech Republic
Yulia Blindyuk	Russia
Louise Moriarty	Ireland
Leticia Gil Parra	Spain
Olivia Dillon	Ireland
Garcia Buittrago	Venezuela
Kathryn Bertine	Saint Kitts and Nevis
Monica Holler	Sweden
Christine Majerus	Luxembourg
Karin Aune	Sweden
Anna Harkowska	Poland
Robyn de Groot	South Africa
Cherise Taylor	South Africa
Uênia Fernandes de Souza	Brazil
Emilia Fahlin	Sweden
Nathalie Bates	Australia
Yolandi Du Toit	South Africa
Janildes Fernandes Silva	Brazil
Gema Pascual Torrecilla	Spain
Marie Lindberg	Sweden
Heather Wilson	Ireland
Alena Sits Ko	Belarus
Polona Batagelj	Slovenia
Nathalie Lamborelle	Luxembourg
Laura Lepasalu	Estonia
Katarína Uhláriková	Slovakia
Adriana Lovera Varela	Venezuela
Mariya Slokotovich	Kazakhstan
