= 2005 UCI Road World Championships – Women's time trial =

Women's time trial
2005 UCI Road World Championships
- Rainbow jersey

Race details
- Dates: 21 September 2005 in Madrid, Spain
- Stages: 1
- Distance: 21.9 km (13.6 mi)
- Winning time: 28' 51"

Medalists
	Gold	Karin Thürig (SUI)
	Silver	Joane Somarriba (ESP)
	Bronze	Kristin Armstrong (USA)

The Women's time trial at the 2005 UCI Road World Championships took place over a distance of 21.9 kilometres (13.6 miles) in Madrid, Spain on 21 September 2005.

== Final classification ==
Rank	Rider	Country	Time
1st place, gold medalist(s)	Karin Thürig	Switzerland	28' 51"
2nd place, silver medalist(s)	Joane Somarriba	Spain	+ 5"
3rd place, bronze medalist(s)	Kristin Armstrong	United States	+ 39"
4	Judith Arndt	Germany	+ 56"
5	Amber Neben	United States	+ 57"
6	Zulfiya Zabirova	Kazakhstan	+ 1' 01"
7	Mirjam Melchers	Netherlands	+ 1' 02"
8	Christine Thorburn	United States	+ 1' 13"
9	Svetlana Boubnenkova	Russia	+ 1' 38"
10	Edita Pučinskaitė	Lithuania	+ 1' 41"
11	Christiane Soeder	Austria	+ 1' 45"
12	Edwige Pitel	France	+ 1' 55"
13	Priska Doppmann	Switzerland	+ 1' 57"
14	Oenone Wood	Australia	+ 2' 00"
15	Nicole Brändli	Switzerland	+ 2' 09"
16	Tatiana Guderzo	Italy	+ 2' 12"
17	Susanne Ljungskog	Sweden	+ 2' 13"
18	Madeleine Sandig	Germany	+ 2' 16"
19	Susan Palmer-Komar	Canada	+ 2' 28"
20	Dori Ruano Sanchon	Spain	+ 2' 31"
21	Sara Carrigan	Australia	+ 2' 36"
22	Anna Zugno	Italy	+ 2' 37"
23	Olga Slyusareva	Russia	+ 2' 39"
24	Bogumiła Matusiak	Poland	+ 2' 40"
25	Marina Jaunâtre	France	+ 2' 46"
26	Melissa Holt	New Zealand	+ 3' 06"
27	Trine Hansen	Denmark	+ 3' 10"
28	Felicia Greer	Canada	+ 3' 11"
29	Linda Serup	Denmark	+ 3' 11"
30	Natasha Maes	Belgium	+ 3' 17"
31	Kateryna Krasova	Ukraine	+ 3' 48"
32	Grete Treier	Estonia	+ 3' 56"
33	Iryna Shpylova	Ukraine	+ 4' 29"
34	Daiva Tušlaitė	Lithuania	+ 4' 44"
35	Bernadette Schober	Austria	+ 4' 59"
36	Trixi Worrack	Germany	+ 5' 15"
37	Agnes Kay Eppers Reynders	Bolivia	+ 5' 46"
38	Anna Skawinska	Poland	+ 5' 53"
DNS	Anita Valen de Vries	Norway	-
