= Krasova =

Krasova may refer to:

== People ==
- Kateryna Krasova, Ukrainian road cyclist
- Marta Krásová (1901–1970), Czech opera singer
- Vera Krasova (born 1987), Russian model
- Vladimíra Krásová, Czech bodybuilder

== Places ==
- Krasová, a municipality and village in the South Moravian Region, Czech Republic
