= 2007 Tour of Flanders for Women =

2007 Tour of Flanders
2007 UCI Women's Road World Cup, race 2 of 9

Race details
- Dates: 8 April 2007
- Distance: 122 km (76 mi)
- Winning time: 3h 11' 00"

Results
	Winner	Nicole Cooke (GBR)	(Raleigh–Lifeforce–Creation HB Pro Cycling Team)
	Second	Zoulfia Zabirova (RUS)	(Bigla Cycling Team)
	Third	Marianne Vos (NED)	(Team DSB Bank)

The fourth Tour of Flanders for Women, a women's road cycling race in Belgium, was held on 8 April 2007. British rider Nicole Cooke won the race in a two-woman sprint with Russian Zoulfia Zabirova. Marianne Vos finished third.

The race started in Oudenaarde and finished in Meerbeke, taking in 11 categorized climbs and three flat cobbled sectors, covering a total distance of 122 kilometres (76 miles). It was the second event of the 2007 UCI Women's Road World Cup.

== Race summary ==
164 riders started the race in Oudenaarde. The early tempo was high as pre-race favourite Nicole Cooke put her Raleigh-Lifeforce team to work. On the Valkenberg, with 39 km to go, Cooke's teammate Karin Thürig went clear and built a 50-second lead by the foot of the Muur van Geraardsbergen. Nicole Cooke bridged the gap to Thürig on the Muur with 16 km remaining before breaking clear on the final climb, the Bosberg. However, she was caught by the chasing group shortly after. Thürig then attacked from the six-strong lead group, but was caught again. As Thürig was caught, Cooke launched the decisive attack, which only Zoulfia Zabirova could follow. Cooke easily beat Zabirova in the sprint; Dutch rider Marianne Vos finished third at five seconds.

== Result ==
Result
Rank	Rider	Team	Time
1	Nicole Cooke (GBR)	Raleigh–Lifeforce–Creation HB Pro Cycling Team	3h 11' 00"
2	Zoulfia Zabirova (RUS)	Bigla Cycling Team	+ 2"
3	Marianne Vos (NED)	Team DSB Bank	+ 5"
4	Trixi Worrack (GER)	Equipe Nürnberger Versicherung	+ 7"
5	Karin Thürig (GER)	Raleigh–Lifeforce–Creation HB Pro Cycling Team	+ 7"
6	Susanne Ljungskog (SWE)	Team Flexpoint	+ 7"
7	Monia Baccaille (ITA)	Saccarelli EMU Marsciano	+ 28"
8	Marta Bastianelli (SWE)	Safi–Pasta Zara–Manhattan	+ 28"
9	Sofie Goor (BEL)	Vlaanderen-Capri Sonne-T-Interim	+ 28"
10	Lorian Graham (AUS)	Australian National Team	+ 28"
