= 2007 Ronde van Drenthe World Cup =

2007 UCI Women's Road World Cup, race 3 of 9

Race details
- Dates: 14 April 2007
- Stages: 1
- Distance: 136.6 km (84.9 mi)
- Winning time: 3h 33' 47"

Results
	Winner	Adrie Visser (NED)	(Team DSB Bank)
	Second	Élodie Touffet (FRA)	(Menikini-Selle Italia-Gysko)
	Third	Marianne Vos (NED)	(Team DSB Bank)

The 2007 Ronde van Drenthe World Cup was the first UCI Women's Road World Cup running on the Ronde van Drenthe. It was held on 14 April 2007 over a distance of 136.6 kilometres (84.9 miles). 164 elite female cyclists took part in the race and 99 of them finished.

== General standings (top 15) ==
	Cyclists	Team	Time	World Cup points
1	Adrie Visser (NED)	Team DSB Bank	3h 33' 47"	75
2	Élodie Touffet (FRA)	Menikini-Selle Italia-Gysko	s.t.	50
3	Marianne Vos (NED)	Team DSB Bank	+ 17"	35
4	Ina Teutenberg (GER)	T-Mobile Women	+ 17"	30
5	Suzanne de Goede (NED)	T-Mobile Women	+ 17"	27
6	Rochelle Gilmore (AUS)	Menikini-Selle Italia-Gysko	+ 17"	24
7	Nicole Cooke (GBR)	Raleigh Lifeforce Pro Cycling Team	+ 17"	21
8	Giorgia Bronzini (ITA)	Safi–Pasta Zara–Manhattan	+ 17"	18
9	Monia Baccaille (ITA)	Saccarelli Emu Sea Marsciano	+ 17"	15
10	Mie Bekker Lacota (DEN)	Team Flexpoint	+ 17"	11
11	Tanja Hennes (GER)	Bigla Cycling Team	+ 17"	10
12	Kirsten Wild (NED)	AA-Drink Cycling Team	+ 17"	9
13	Ludivine Henrion (BEL)	Team DSB Bank	+ 17"	8
14	Brooke Miller (USA)	United States of America	+ 17"	7
15	Ellen van Dijk (NED)	Vrienden van het Platteland	+ 17"	6

Results from CQ ranking.
