= Finot =

Finot is a surname, and may refer to:

- Alice Finot (born 1991), French athlete
- Enrique Finot (1891–1952), Bolivian historian and diplomat
- Frédéric Finot (born 1977), French road cyclist
- Louis Finot (archaeologist) (1864–1935), French archaeologist
- Louis Finot (footballer) (1909–1996), French footballer
- Magalie Finot-Laivier (born 1973), French road cyclist
