= Olessya Atrashkevich =

Kazakhstani cyclist

Personal information
- Born: Kazakhstan

Cycling career
- Sport: Cycling
- Discipline: Road cycling

Olessya Atrashkevich is a former road cyclist from Kazakhstan. She represented her nation at the 2007 UCI Road World Championships.
