= Emma Pooley =

British cyclist

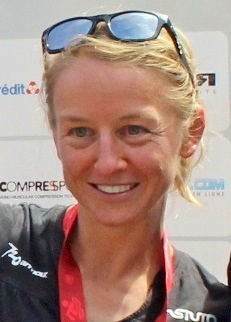
- Pooley on the podium after winning the 2017 Ventouxman triathlon

Personal information
- Full name: Emma Jane Pooley
- Born: 3 October 1982 (age 44) Wandsworth, England, United Kingdom
- Height: 1.57 m (5 ft 2 in)

Cycling career
- Sport: Cycling
- Discipline: Road
- Rider type: Climber, time trialist

Amateur team
- 2005: Cambridge University CC

Professional teams
- 2006: Team FBUK
- 2007–2008: Team Specialized Designs for Women
- 2009–2010: Cervélo TestTeam
- 2011: Garmin–Cervélo
- 2012: AA Drink–leontien.nl
- 2013: Bigla Cycling Team
- 2014: Lotto–Belisol Ladies
- 2016: Lotto–Soudal Ladies

Major wins
- Stage Races Tour de l'Aude (2010) Grande Boucle Féminine Internationale (2009) Giro del Trentino Alto Adige-Südtirol (2010) Tour Cycliste Féminin International de l'Ardèche (2011, 2012) Tour languedoc roussillon feminin (2013) Tour de Bretagne Féminin (2008) Single-Day Races World Time Trial Championships (2010) UCI Women's Road World Cup Trofeo Alfredo Binda (2008, 2011) Coupe du Monde de Montréal (2009) GP de Plouay (2009, 2010) La Flèche Wallonne Féminine (2010) UCI Single Day Races Grand Prix Elsy Jacobs (2010) Grand Prix De Suisse (2010) Gp Costa Etrusca – Giro Dei Comuni Rosignano-livorno (2009) National Road Race Champion (2010) National Time Trial Champion (2009, 2010, 2014)
Medal record
Women's road bicycle racing
Representing Great Britain
Olympic Games
Silver medal – second place	2008 Beijing	Time trial
UCI Road World Championships
Gold medal – first place	2010 Melbourne	Time trial
Bronze medal – third place	2011 Copenhagen	Time trial
Representing England
Commonwealth Games
Silver medal – second place	2014 Glasgow	Time trial
Silver medal – second place	2014 Glasgow	Road race
Representing AA Drink–leontien.nl
UCI Road World Championships
Bronze medal – third place	2012 Limburg	Team Time trial
Women's duathlon
Representing Great Britain
ITU Long Distance Duathlon World Championships
Gold medal – first place	2014 Zofingen	Individual
Gold medal – first place	2015 Zofingen	Individual
Gold medal – first place	2016 Zofingen	Individual
Gold medal – first place	2017 Zofingen	Individual
ETU Middle Distance Duathlon European Championships
Gold medal – first place	2017 Sankt Wendel	Individual

Emma Jane Pooley (born 3 October 1982) is a British-Swiss athlete in multiple sports. A former professional cyclist who specialised in time trials and hilly races, she later transferred to endurance running, duathlon and triathlon, and was four-times world champion in long-distance duathlon. She competes in long-distance and uphill mountain running and has represented Switzerland at the world trailrunning championships.

She won an Olympic silver medal in the time trial in 2008 and was world time trial champion in 2010. She has won six UCI Women's Road World Cup one-day races, as well as several stage races including the ten-day Tour de l'Aude. She is three-times a British time trial champion and in 2010 also won the British road race championships.

Pooley retired from professional cycling after the 2014 Commonwealth Games to concentrate on triathlon, duathlon and long-distance running, having won the Lausanne Marathon and the Swissman triathlon the previous year. She went on to win the ITU Powerman Duathlon World Championships at Powerman Zofingen in September 2014 and again in 2015. On 16 December 2015, Pooley announced that she would be returning temporarily to cycling, seeking to qualify to represent Great Britain at the 2016 Summer Olympics in Rio, as she felt the unusually mountainous time trial course on offer played to her strengths.

In June 2016, Pooley came out of retirement and re-signed for her former team, Lotto–Soudal Ladies, in time for the 2016 Giro Rosa. After racing in the Olympic time trial and road race she returned to duathlon with two further world championship titles at ITU Powerman Duathlon World Championships at Powerman Zofingen in September 2016 and 2017 as well as a European middle-distance duathlon title in 2017.

Pooley was a founding member of Le Tour Entier, which campaigned for a Women's Tour de France and improvements to women's cycling generally.

== Early life ==
Born in Wandsworth, London, Pooley grew up in Norwich, where she attended Norwich High School for Girls and the sixth form of Norwich School. She began studying for a mathematics degree at Trinity Hall, Cambridge in 2001 before switching to engineering and graduated with a first class honours degree in 2005.

She started cycling at university after suffering an injury from cross-country running. Although she originally took up cycling in 2002 purely as a substitute for running during the two month period required for her stress fracture to heal, she continued with the sport after her recovery. A month after her recovery she entered her first time trial. At Cambridge she won university sporting blues in cross-country running, triathlon and cycling.

== Cycling career ==
=== 2005 to 2008 ===
After a surprise fourth place in the national road championship in 2005, she was signed by UK national team Team Fat Birds UK and rode in the British team supporting Nicole Cooke in the road race at that year's world championships, but crashed out of the race. She rode for the same trade team in 2006 when they were based in Belgium and registered as an international-level UCI Women's Team under the name Team FBUK.

She signed with the Switzerland-based Team Specialized Designs for Women for 2007, with whom she won her first UCI race, stage 3 of the Thüringen Rundfahrt der Frauen, after a 120 km solo escape, the first of many wins from solo breakaways. She represented Britain in the 2007 UCI Road World Championships, finishing 8th in the time trial and 9th in the road race. This earned Great Britain one of their places in the 2008 Summer Olympics.

In 2008, she won the Trofeo Alfredo Binda UCI Road World Cup in Italy after another solo breakaway. She finished 23rd in the Olympic road race on 11 August 2008, where she rode in support of Nicole Cooke's successful gold medal bid but her greatest success of the summer came in the time trial on 13 August, where she won the silver medal behind American Kristin Armstrong.

=== 2009 to 2012 ===
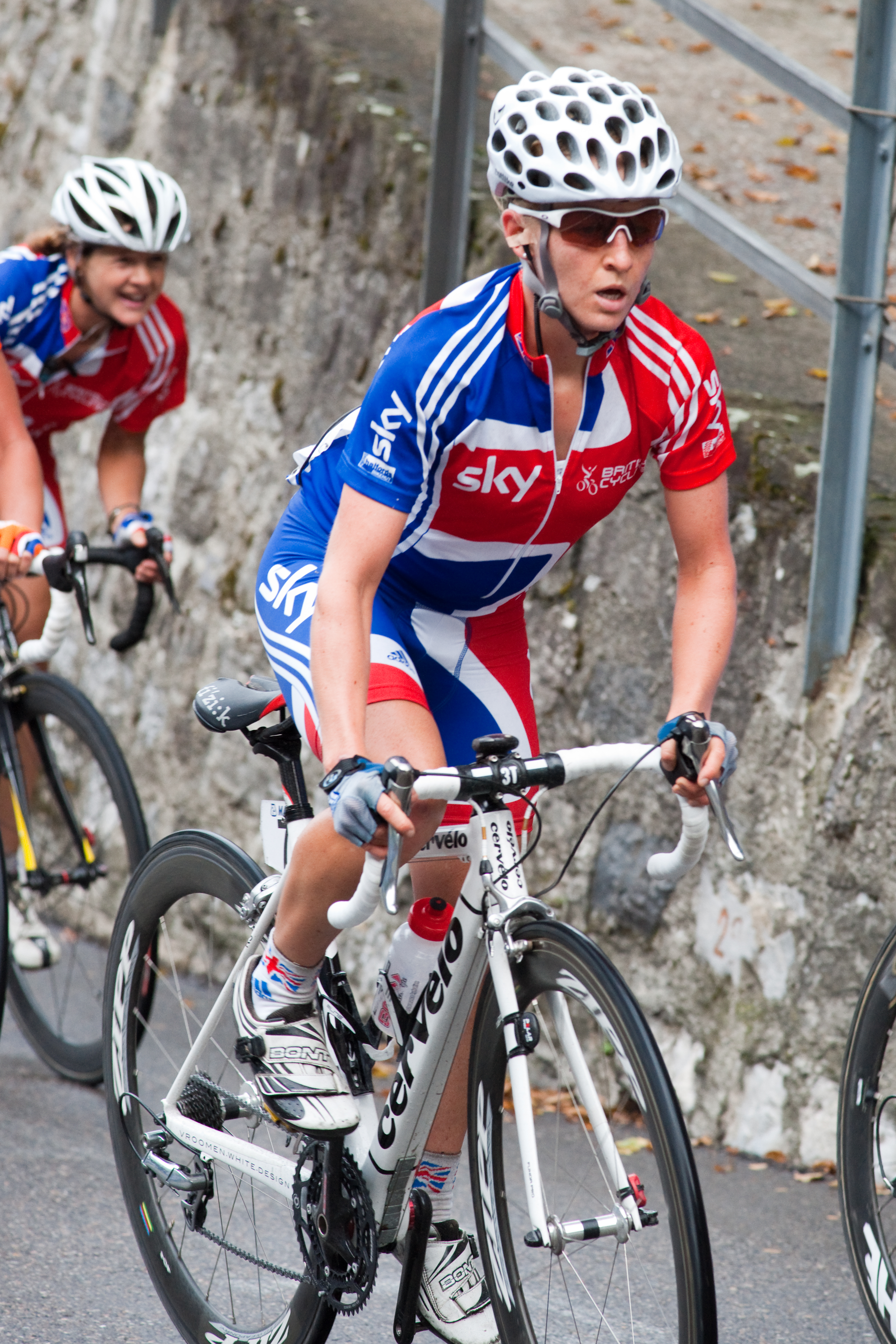
Pooley (with Sharon Laws behind) during the 2009 UCI Road World Championships in Mendrisio, Switzerland

In 2009, Pooley signed to the Cervélo Test Team, where she remained until their disbandment at the end of 2011. She won the 2009 national time trial championships and took wins for the team in the Coupe du Monde de Montreal, GP de Plouay, and Grand Prix Costa Etrusca one-day races, and the final edition of the Grande Boucle Féminine, once dubbed "the women's Tour de France". Due to financial issues the 2009 Grande Boucle was reduced to only four stages, leading Pooley to joke that it was "more of a Petite Boucle than Grande". She also wore the leader's jersey for three stages of the Giro d'Italia Femminile, but finished the race in fourth place in the general classification after losing the race lead due to her poor descending, which she improved after the 2009 season with the help of her coach Tim Williams and British Cycling psychiatrist Steve Peters.

2010 saw several of Pooley's greatest successes. She won her first major stage race in May, the final edition of the Tour de l'Aude, the longest-running event on the UCI women's calendar. She went on to win another top-level stage race in June, the Giro del Trentino Alto Adige-Südtirol. She also won two UCI Women's Road World Cup one-day races, the La Flèche Wallonne Féminine and the GP de Plouay, and earned a rainbow jersey by winning the time trial at the Road World Championships. She was British national time trial champion for the second year running and also took her only national road race champion's jersey. She finished the year 5th in the 2010 UCI Women's Road World Rankings, the highest end-of-year ranking of her cycling career, and received one of the British Olympic Association's Athlete of the Year trophies, recognising her performance that year as the best by any British cyclist of either sex in any Olympic cycling discipline.

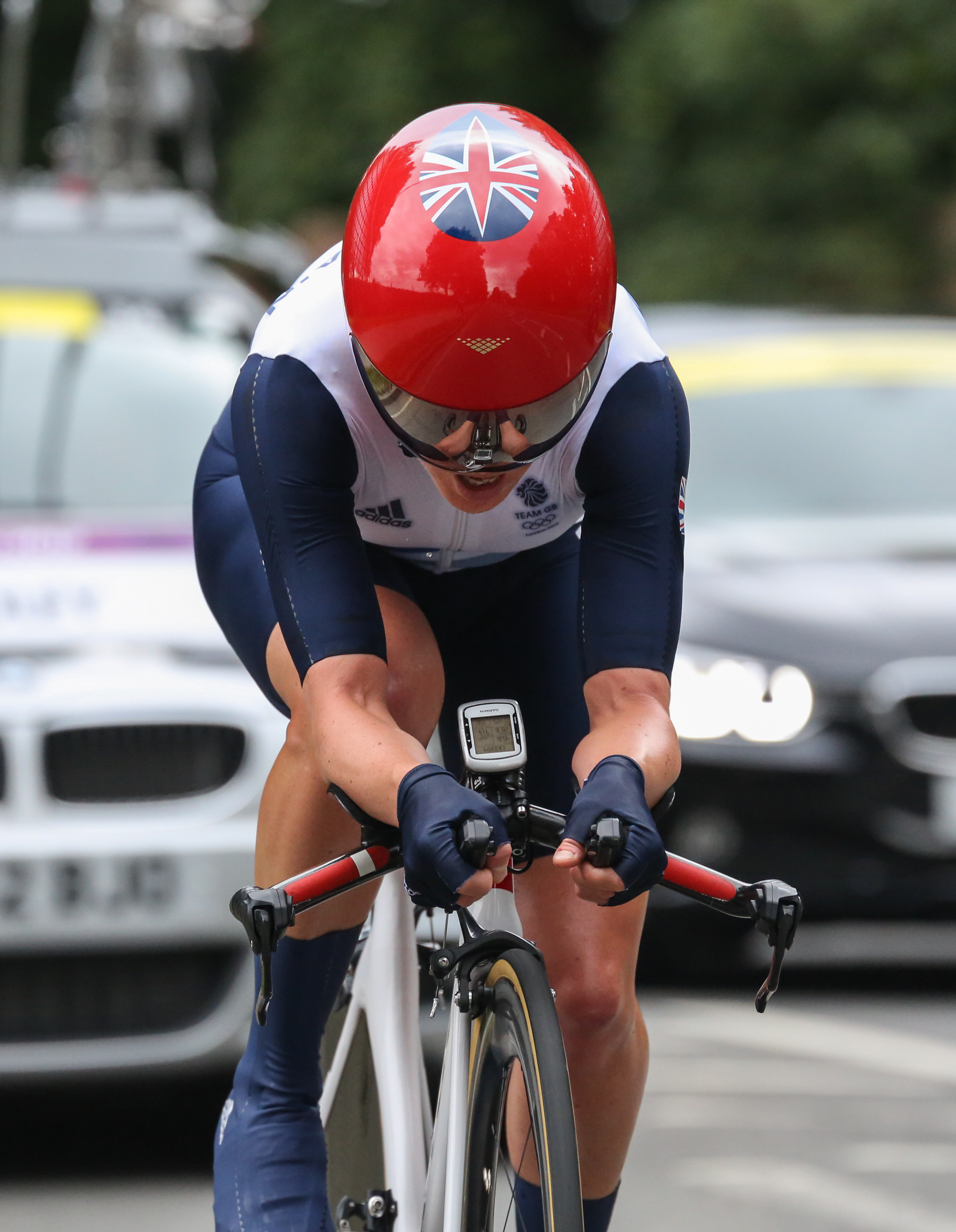
Pooley competing in the 2012 Olympics time trial in London

In March 2011, Pooley won the one-day Trofeo Alfredo Binda World Cup race for a second time, again after a lengthy lone breakaway. She broke her collarbone in training on 12 April so was unable to defend her Flèche Wallonne title and did not race again until the women's invitational time trial at the Tour of California on 20 May, in which she placed fifth. Later in the year, however, she won the hilly Tour de l'Ardèche stage race in France and finished second to Marianne Vos in the Giro d'Italia Femminile, both achievements that she would repeat in 2012.

Following the discontinuation of the Garmin Cervélo women's team at the end of 2011, Pooley began riding for the Dutch team AA Drink–leontien.nl which, in turn, wound up at the end of the 2012 season. At the 2012 Summer Olympics she competed in the Women's road race, helping teammate Lizzie Armitstead to win a silver medal, and placed sixth in the Women's time trial.

=== 2013 ===
Pooley took a step back from pro-racing when she signed for the long-established, but non-UCI registered, Swiss-based Bigla Cycling Team for the 2013 season in order to concentrate on completing her PhD in geotechnical engineering. In a severely reduced season, she missed the 2013 UCI Road World Championships. Pooley managed to win four UCI-ranked races including the six-stage Tour Languedoc Rousillon in May.

In September 2013, Pooley joined with professional cyclists Kathryn Bertine and Marianne Vos and professional triathlete Chrissie Wellington to form an activist group called Le Tour Entier (“the whole tour”), to petition ASO to launch a women's Tour de France.

=== 2014 ===
Pooley signed for the Lotto Belisol team for 2014. She claimed her third national time trial champion's jersey and won three stages and the mountains classification at the Giro d'Italia Femminile.

Pooley announced during the 2014 Commonwealth Games that she would retire from cycling after competing in the Games' road race in order to concentrate on competing in long-distance triathlons and mountain running. Following her retirement announcement, Pooley took the silver medals in both the women's road time trial and road race, and played a key role in helping England teammate Lizzie Armitstead win the road race gold medal.

=== 2015 to 2016 ===
Pooley made a return to competitive cycling in October 2015 when she competed at the Chrono des Nations time trial, where she finished sixth. In December 2015 she announced that she would aim to compete for Team GB in the 2016 Summer Olympics in Rio de Janeiro after being approached by British Cycling's technical director Shane Sutton, who had studied the Olympic road racing courses and felt that Pooley would have a good chance of winning a medal in the time trial and of helping Lizzie Armitstead to win the road race. She also confirmed that she would continue to compete in triathlon and duathlon competitions in 2016. Pooley made her first appearance in a mass start road race for two years in April 2016 for the British national team at the Women's Tour de Yorkshire, where she helped teammate Alice Barnes to fourth place. In June 2016 Lotto–Soudal Ladies announced that Pooley had rejoined the team for the remainder of the 2016 season, and that she would be part of the team's squad for the 2016 Giro d'Italia Femminile with a role as a domestique for Claudia Lichtenberg. At the Olympics, Pooley rode in the service of Armitstead in the road race, whilst in the time trial she finished 14th, just over two minutes down on winner Kristen Armstrong.

=== 2018 ===
On 28 July 2018 Emma won the Brompton World Championships, which ran as part of the RideLondon event. The event takes the form of a Le Mans style start as 500+ smartly-dressed competitors have to unfold their bikes and completed eight lap circuit around St James's Park.

=== 2020 ===
On 8 July 2020, Pooley set a new Everesting women's record by climbing the Haggenegg climb (6.8 km with an average gradient of 13%), near Schwyz in Switzerland, ten times in a time of 8 hours 53:36. Her ascent (and descent) covered 129.8 km, and beat the previous female Everesting record of 9 hours 08:31 set by Hannah Rhodes on the Kirkstone Pass in England on 8 June 2020.

== Running and triathlon career ==
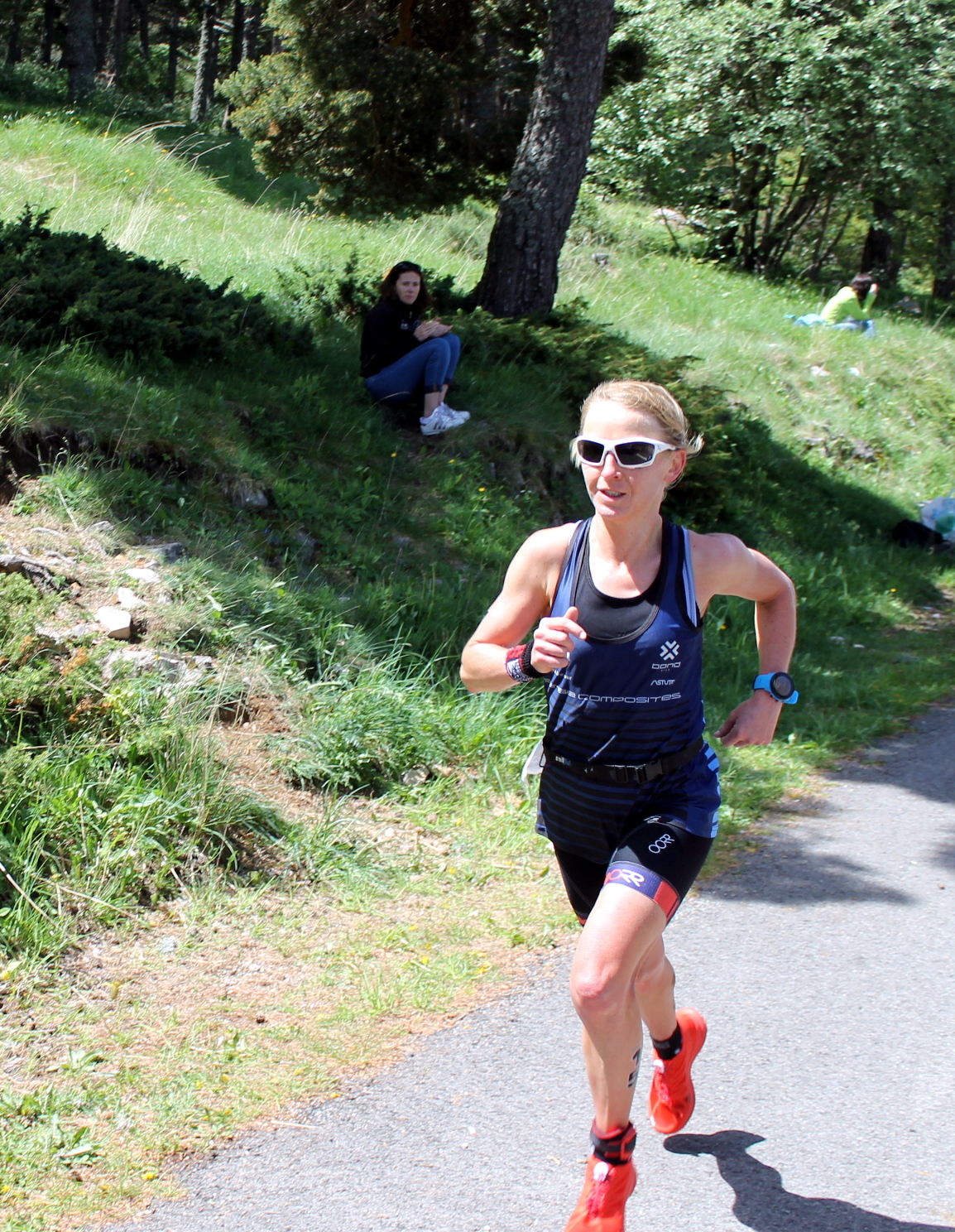
Pooley on her way to winning the 2017 Ventouxman triathlon

Pooley won the Lausanne Marathon in October 2013 with a time of 2:44:29 hours, which placed her inside the top 20 fastest British women in 2013. She has also enjoyed success in triathlon, finishing as top female at the inaugural Swissman triathlon and coming fifth in the Ironman Zurich event. After her retirement from cycling she won the 2014 Powerman Duathlon World Championships in Zofingen, Switzerland at her first attempt, setting a new course record and finishing half an hour ahead of the second-placed finisher.

In February 2015 Pooley won the Challenge Philippines triathlon with a margin of more than ten minutes over the next competitor. She went on to finish ninth at the Ironman Asia-Pacific Championships in Melbourne the following month. Subsequently, in the summer Pooley won the long course race at the Alpe d'Huez Triathlon and the Embrunman triathlon, and successfully defended her Duathlon world title in September.

In March 2016 Pooley took a comfortable win at the Powerman Asia Duathlon Championships in Malaysia, where she finished with a 16-minute lead over the runner up. Following her appearance at the 2016 Olympics, in September she took her third consecutive long-distance duathlon world title with a winning margin of eleven minutes.

Pooley added another international duathlon title when she won the European Powerman Middle Distance Duathlon Championships in Sankt Wendel in May 2017, finishing almost nine minutes ahead of the second-placed finisher. She followed this up by winning her fourth back-to-back Long Distance Duathlon World Championship in September, finishing 27 minutes ahead of the second-placed finisher.

In 2021 Pooley became Swiss champion in long-distance trailrunning (50 km), and went on to take the overall win at the 100 km Ultra Tour de Monte Rosa. In November 2022, she raced for the Swiss national team at the World Mountain and Trail Running Championships in Thailand, finishing 11th in the 80 km event.

== Media work ==
On 2 January 2015 Pooley was a member of the winning team on Christmas University Challenge, representing Trinity Hall, Cambridge who defeated Balliol College, Oxford, the University of Edinburgh and the University of Hull. Her teammates were international rower Tom James, novelist Adam Mars-Jones and actor Dan Starkey.

Between February 2018 and March 2019, Pooley worked at Global Cycling Network as a presenter.

== Personal life ==
Pooley has lived in or near Zürich in Switzerland since 2006, and in December 2013 completed her doctorate in geotechnical engineering at ETH Zurich, supervised by Sarah Springman, a former British triathlete who is a vice-president of the International Triathlon Union. She has credited her move to Switzerland with enabling her to discover her ability as a climbing specialist. She received an honorary Doctorate of Civil Law from the University of East Anglia in July 2012 and an honorary PhD from the University of Strathclyde in July 2015.

== Major results ==
2005
4th Road race, National Road Championships

2006
3rd Rund Um die Rigi

2007
1st Stage 3 Thüringen Rundfahrt
1st Rund um Schönaich
3rd Overall Grande Boucle Féminine
UCI Road World Championships

8th UCI Road World Championships – Women's time trial
9th Road race

2008
1st Overall Tour de Bretagne

1st Stages 3 & 4 (ITT)

1st Trofeo Alfredo Binda
1st Perth Criterium Series
2nd Time trial, Olympic Games
2nd Road race, National Road Championships
2nd Overall Tour Cycliste Féminin International Ardèche

1st Stage 4

8th UCI Road World Championships – Women's time trial

2009
National Road Championships

1st Time trial
3rd Road race

1st Overall Grande Boucle Féminine Internationale

1st Stages 1 (ITT) & 3

1st GP de Plouay
1st GP Costa Etrusca
1st Coupe du Monde Cycliste Féminine de Montréal
4th Overall Giro d'Italia Femminile

2010
1st UCI Road World Championships – Women's time trial
National Road Championships

1st Road race
1st Time trial

1st Overall Giro del Trentino

1st Stage 1

1st Overall Grand Prix Elsy Jacobs
1st Overall Tour de l'Aude
1st La Flèche Wallonne
1st GP de Plouay
1st Overall Grand Prix de Suisse

1st Mountains classification
1st Stage 7

1st Mountains classification, Giro d'Italia Femminile

2011
1st Overall Tour de l'Ardèche

1st Stage 3

1st Trofeo Alfredo Binda
Thüringen Rundfahrt der Frauen

1st Mountains classification
1st Stage 4

1st Stage 3 Iurreta Emakumeen Bira
2nd Overall Giro d'Italia Femminile

1st Stage 8

3rd UCI Road World Championships – Women's time trial

2012
1st Overall Tour de l'Ardèche

1st Stages 3 & 6

1st Durango-Durango Emakumeen Saria
1st Stage 2 Emakumeen Bira
2nd Overall Giro d'Italia Femminile

1st Mountains classification

2nd Lucerne Marathon
3rd Overall Giro del Trentino
3rd Team time trial
4th UCI Road World Championships – Women's time trial
6th Time trial, Olympic Games

2013
1st Overall Tour Languedoc Roussillon

1st Stage 3

1st Swissman Xtreme Triathlon
1st Zürcher Oberlander Berglaufcup
1st Türlerseelauf
1st Lausanne Marathon
2nd Overall Tour de Feminin-O cenu Českého Švýcarska

1st Stages 3 & 5

3rd Overall Gracia–Orlová
5th Ironman Switzerland
6th Jungfrau Marathon

2014
1st Time trial, National Road Championships
1st Powerman Duathlon World Championships
Commonwealth Games

2nd Road race
2nd Time trial

2nd Rapperswil 70.3
3rd Challenge Philippines
7th La Flèche Wallonne
9th Overall Giro d'Italia Femminile

1st Mountains classification
1st Stages 6, 8 & 9

2015
1st Powerman Duathlon World Championships
1st Alpe d'Huez Triathlon Long course race
1st Embrunman
1st Challenge Philippines
3rd Ironman France
5th Ironman Wales
6th Chrono des Nations
9th Ironman Asia-Pacific Championships

2016
1st Powerman Asia Duathlon Championships
1st Powerman Duathlon World Championships
1st Taiwan KOM Challenge
4th Time trial, National Road Championships

2017
1st European Powerman Middle Distance Duathlon Championships
1st Taiwan KOM Challenge
1st Powerman Duathlon World Championships
1st Inferno Half Marathon
2nd Alpe d'Huez Triathlon Long course race

2018
5th Cadel Evans Great Ocean Road Race

2019
1st Stanserhorn Berglauf
1st Rigi Berglauf
1st Further Pyrenees Ultracycling Race

2020
3rd Sierre Zinal

2021
1st Swiss Trail Running Championships

1st UTMR 100km Trail
