= Maria Rosario Rodriguez =

Spanish cyclist

Personal information
- Born: 11 June 1982 (age 44) Spain

Cycling career
- Sport: Cycling
- Discipline: Road cycling

Professional team
- 2007: Comunidad Valenciana

Maria Rosario Rodriguez (born 11 June 1982) is a road cyclist from Spain. She represented her nation at the 2007 UCI Road World Championships.
