= Svitlana Semchouk =

Ukrainian cyclist

Personal information
- Born: 26 December 1984 (age 41) Ukraine

Cycling career
- Sport: Cycling
- Disciplines: Road cycling, Track cycling

Svitlana Semchouk (born 26 December 1984) is a track and road cyclist from Ukraine. She represented her nation at the 2005 UCI Road World Championships.
