= Veronika Sharametsyeva =

Personal information
- Born: 1 December 1982 (age 43) Belarus

Cycling career
- Sport: Cycling
- Discipline: Road cycling

Professional team
- 2007: USC Chirio Forno d'Asolo

Veronika Sharametsyeva (born 1 December 1982) is a road cyclist from Belarus. She represented her nation in the road race at the 2005 UCI Road World Championships but failed to finish.
