= Yulia Razenkova =

Russian cyclist

Personal information
- Born: Russia

Cycling career
- Sport: Cycling
- Discipline: Road cycling

Yulia Razenkova is a road cyclist from Russia. She represented her nation at the 2005 UCI Road World Championships.
