= Veronika Sprügl =

Austrian cyclist

Personal information
- Born: 21 December 1987 (age 38) Austria

Cycling career
- Sport: Cycling
- Discipline: Road cycling

Professional teams
- 2005: Arbö Askö Graz
- 2006–2008: Uniqa Graz

Veronika Sprügl (born 21 December 1987) is a road cyclist from Austria. She represented her nation at the 2007 UCI Road World Championships.
