= Nicole Cooke =

Welsh cyclist (born 1983)

Nicole Cooke MBE
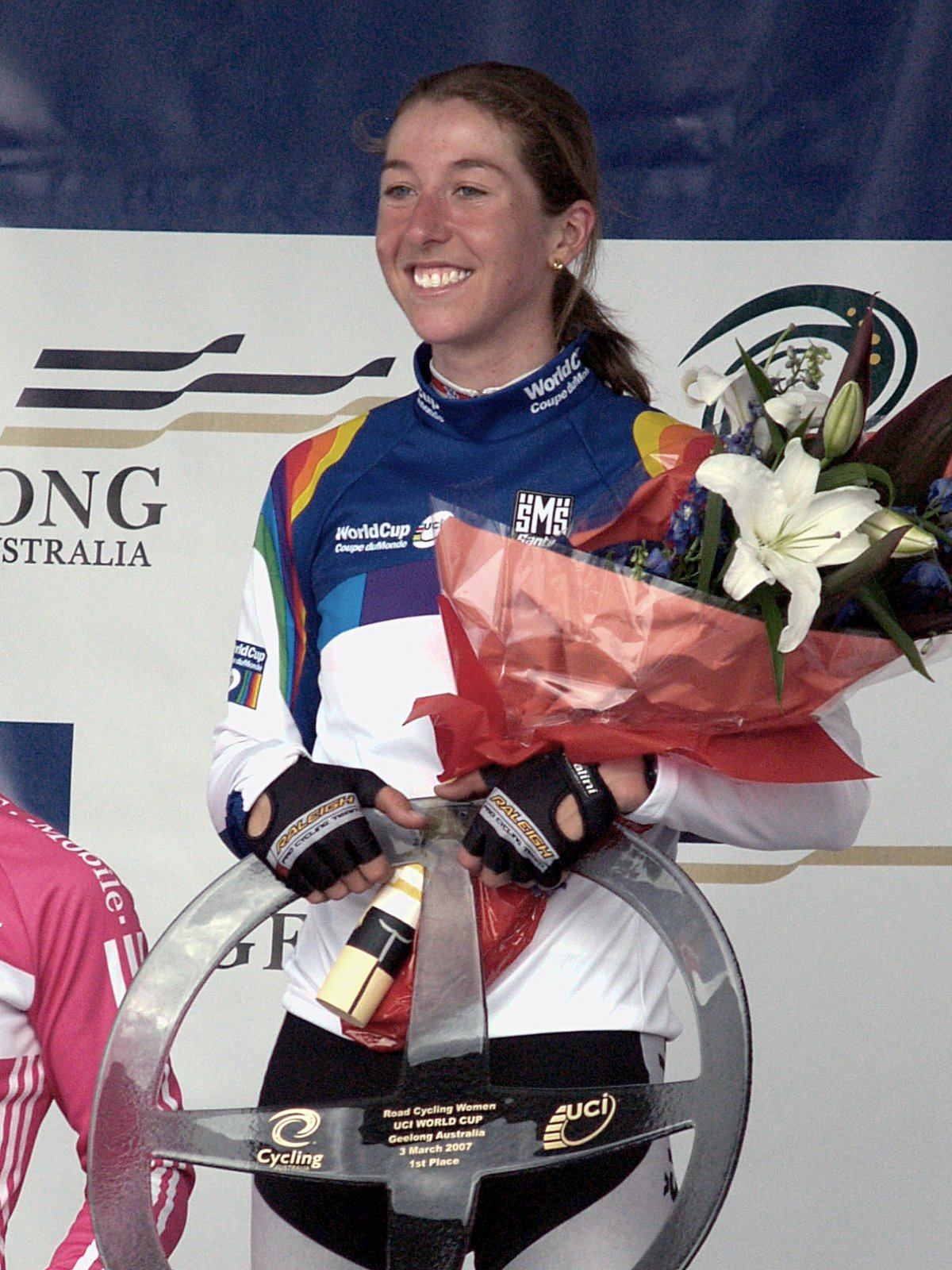
- Cooke on the podium after winning the 2007 Geelong World Cup

Personal information
- Full name: Nicole Denise Cooke
- Nicknames: The Wick Wonder, Cookie
- Born: 13 April 1983 (age 43) Swansea, Wales
- Height: 167 cm (5 ft 6 in)
- Weight: 58 kg (128 lb; 9 st)

Cycling career
- Sport: Cycling
- Current team: Retired
- Discipline: Road
- Role: Rider

Amateur team
- Cardiff Ajax CC

Professional teams
- 2002: Deia-Pragma-Colnago
- 2003: Ausra Gruodis-Safi
- 2004–2005: Safi–Pasta Zara–Manhattan
- 2006: Univega Raleigh Lifeforce
- 2007: Raleigh Lifeforce Creation HB Pro Cycling Team
- 2008: Team Halfords Bikehut
- 2009: Vision 1 Racing
- 2011: MCipollini–Giordana
- 2012: Faren–Honda

Major wins
- UCI Women's Road World Cup Overall (2003, 2006) La Flèche Wallonne Féminine (2003, 2005, 2006) Amstel Gold Race (2003) GP Castilla y Leon (2006) Geelong World Cup (2007) Tour of Flanders for Women (2007) GP de Plouay (2003) Stage Races Grande Boucle Féminine Internationale (2006, 2007) Giro d'Italia Femminile (2004) Thüringen Rundfahrt der Frauen (2006) Giro del Trentino Alto Adige-Südtirol (2009) Single-day races Olympic Games Road Race Champion (2008) World Road Race Champion (2008) Commonwealth Games Road Race Champion (2002) National Road Race Champion (1999, 2001–2009) National Cyclo-cross Champion (2001) GP de Wallonie (2005) T Mobile International (2004) Souvenir Magali Pache (2006)
Medal record
Women's Cycling
Representing Great Britain
Olympic Games
Gold medal – first place	2008 Beijing	Road race
UCI Road World Championships
Bronze medal – third place	2003 Hamilton	Road race
Silver medal – second place	2005 Madrid	Road race
Bronze medal – third place	2006 Salzburg	Road race
Gold medal – first place	2008 Varese	Road race
Representing Wales
Commonwealth Games
Gold medal – first place	2002 Manchester	Road race
Bronze medal – third place	2006 Melbourne	Road race

Nicole Denise Cooke (born 13 April 1983) is a Welsh former professional racing cyclist and Commonwealth, Olympic and world road race champion. She was the first British cyclist to win a Grand Tour, which she achieved at the Giro d'Italia Femminile in 2004. At the 2008 Summer Olympics, Cooke became the first British woman to win an Olympic gold medal in cycling, and the first Welsh woman to win an Olympic gold medal in an individual event.

Aged 16, Cooke became the youngest ever winner at the British National Road Championships in 1999, and later won four junior world titles. She began riding professionally in 2002, winning the road race at the 2002 Commonwealth Games, and in 2003, secured the overall UCI Road World Cup title, the first Briton to do so. In 2004, she won the Giro d'Italia Femminile, and the following year, won a silver medal in the road race at the UCI Road World Championships. She claimed a bronze medal in the road race at the 2006 Commonwealth Games, and secured back-to-back Grande Boucle victories in 2006 and 2007. Cooke won the road race at both the 2008 Summer Olympics and 2008 UCI Road World Championships, becoming the first woman to achieve this double in the same year. Cooke retired from cycling on 14 January 2013 at the age of 29. She has been a critic of doping in sport, and has been a proponent for gender equality in cycling.

== Life and career ==
=== Early life and beginnings in cycling ===
Nicole Denise Cooke was born in Swansea on 13 April 1983. She lived in Wick, Vale of Glamorgan, and attended Brynteg Comprehensive School in Bridgend. During her childhood, Cooke raced her father and brother daily on their five-mile round-trip ride to her school. The family went on cycling holidays, where they shared tandem bicycles. She began cycling seriously at age 11, trained at Cardiff Ajax Cycling Club, and entered both the under-12 Welsh and British Cyclo Cross Championships. Lacking local competitions to enter, Cooke travelled to the Netherlands to race aged 12, and took her O-level's and A-levels a year early to fit around her cycling aspirations.

At 16, she won her first senior national title at the 1999 British National Road Race Championships, becoming the youngest-ever winner of the race. At 17, she was ineligible to compete for Great Britain at the 2000 Summer Olympics due to her age. British Cycling chose not to make an appeal to the Union Cycliste Internationale (UCI), the sport's governing body, and Cooke said as the national champion that the decision made no sense. She won the senior women's title at the 2001 British National Cyclocross Championships, and won her second senior title at the British National Road Race Championships that same year. She won four UCI World Championship Junior titles, the road race in 2000, and the treble of mountain bike, time trial, and road race in 2001. Cooke was awarded the 2001 Bidlake Memorial Prize for outstanding performance or contribution to British cycling. Cooke was offered a place on British Cycling's Olympic Podium Programme, but she rejected the opportunity as it centred around track cycling which she did not wish to participate in.

=== International cycling career 2002–2007 ===
Cooke rode professionally with the Italian Deia-Pragma-Colnago team for the 2002 season, while also joining British Cycling's Elite programme which allowed her to attend training camps and races with the British team. She based herself in Treviso, Italy, where she shared a house with Australian rider Rochelle Gilmore, and learned to speak Italian. That year, Cooke won the Ronde van Westerbeek, the Trofeo Citta Di Rosignano, and the Memorial Pasquale di Carlo.

At the 2002 Commonwealth Games in Manchester, Cooke missed out on a medal in the time trial after finishing tenth, with her coach Shane Sutton stating that she was emotionally upset and chronically fatigued after the race. She had trained at a very high intensity in the build-up and was told to rest for six days. Cooke then achieved victory in the road race, winning on the roads of Rivington to earn Wales second-ever cycling gold in the Commonwealth Games, and the first since Louise Jones in 1990. Due to financial issues, the Deia-Pragma-Colnago team failed to pay wages to Cooke and some of her colleagues. The team seized her racing bicycle from a vehicle, and her victory at the subsequent Ronde Van Westerbeek was achieved on a borrowed bike. Cooke finished runner-up in the BBC Wales Sports Personality of the Year competition.

In 2003, Cooke rode for Ausra Gruodis-Safi. That year, she won La Flèche Wallonne Féminine, the Amstel Gold Race, the GP de Plouay and the GP San Francisco. She secured the 2003 UCI Women's Road World Cup title—the youngest rider to ever win the competition and the first Briton to do so. She hit a stationary motorbike in June at the Tour du Grand Montréal, breaking her collarbone, as well as suffering an injury to her knee. Three weeks later, she crashed again at the Giro de Trentino. Cooke came third in the road race at the UCI Road World Championships in Hamilton. After catching France's Jeannie Longo near the end of the race, Cooke was edged out by Sweden's Susanne Ljungskog and Mirjam Melchers of the Netherlands. At the end of the year, she was voted BBC Wales Sports Personality of the Year.

Cooke undertook a spell of rehabilitation in an attempt to cure a knee problem and ultimately underwent surgery in May 2004. At the end of June, in her first race in eight months, she won her fifth British road-race title. The following month, Cooke won the Giro d'Italia Femminile, becoming the youngest winner, and the first British cyclist, male or female, to win a Grand Tour. She took the race lead after winning a climb at Magreglio and successfully defended the pink jersey on the final stage. At the 2004 Summer Olympics in Athens, she placed fifth in the women's road race; Cooke lost time following a final-lap collision with a barrier and finished just behind bronze-medallist Olga Slyusareva of Russia. She also came 19th in the road time trial.

In 2005, she won La Flèche Wallonne Féminine, the GP Wallonie, the Trofeo Alfredo Binda, and the Trofeo Citta di Rosignano. At the Tour of Flanders, Cooke was one of a group of 20 riders who took a wrong turn on the course. As a result, the points accrued in the race were annulled. She came second in both the Primavera Rosa, and the 2005 World Championships. In the latter, she was beaten by half a bike length by Regina Schleicher of Germany. At the end of 2005, she joined Swiss-based team Univega Pro-Cycling moving to Lugano, Switzerland, in 2006, where she still lived as of March 2012.

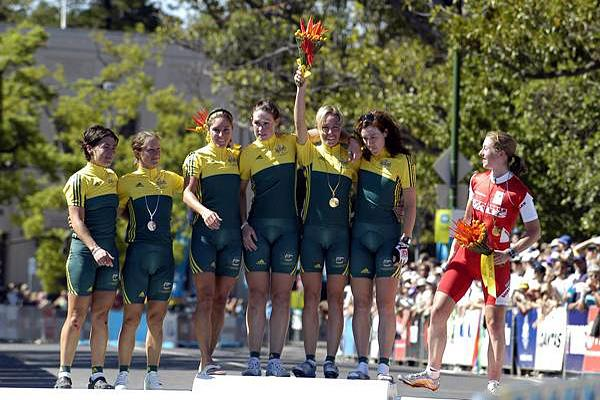
Cooke (right) watches Team Australia celebrate victory in the road race at the 2006 Commonwealth Games.

In December that year, she broke her collarbone during qualifying for the points race at the UCI Track World Cup event in Manchester. After recovering, Cooke won bronze in the road race at the 2006 Commonwealth Games in Melbourne. Racing as the sole Welsh entrant, she finished behind Australians Natalie Bates and Oenone Wood. In her autobiography, she addressed the decision by the Welsh Cycling Union (WCU) to enter her with no teammates, writing that: "the WCU had gifted Australia, Canada, England and New Zealand my head on a plate". The WCU said that steps had been taken to ensure that multiple Welsh riders would be eligible to compete at the next Commonwealth Games.

On 1 August 2006, Cooke reached number one on the UCI's women's world road race rankings. No other British rider had ever reached the top-20 prior to her. She secured the overall World Cup title for a second time, after winning three World Cup races in the season – La Flèche Wallonne Féminine, the Ladies Golden Hour, and the Castilla y Leon. Cooke won the 2006 Grande Boucle stage race by over six minutes. She placed first in the prologue time trial, before extending her lead by over four minutes with victory in a mountain stage featuring a climb of Mont Ventoux. A fifth place on stage five secured her overall win. Cooke won four stages and the overall title at the Thüringen-Rundfahrt stage race, and claimed victory at the Magali Pache time trial. She came third in the road race at the 2006 World Championships in Salzburg, losing out to Marianne Vos and Trixi Worrack in a sprint finish. She also finished fifth in the time trial.

In 2007, Cooke won the Geelong Tour, before achieving victories at the Geelong World Cup, and the Ronde van Vlaanderen (Tour of Flanders for Women), both part of the 2007 UCI Women's Road World Cup. These wins helped Cooke set a new record in the UCI's women's world road race rankings for the biggest gap in points between the first and second-placed cyclists. She won the Trofeo Alfredo Binda, stage two of the GP Costa Etrusca, and successfully defended her Grande Boucle title. In the latter, she took the race lead on stage three, and won the overall title ahead of Switzerland's Priska Doppmann after finishing second on the final stage in the Pyrenees.

A knee injury sustained prior to the final race of the 2007 World Cup, the Rund um die Nürnberger Altstadt, hindered Cooke in the defence of her title, with Dutch rider Vos winning the final race and Cooke finishing 34th. Cooke ended second to Vos in the overall World Cup standings. The injury forced her to miss the 2007 World Championships in Stuttgart. Cooke later said in an interview in 2008 that she had considered quitting cycling due to the injury. Her wellbeing had suffered, and she began "hating" the sport. Cooke was helped by her bike mechanic who recommended seeing Dr Fabio Bartolucci; he later started coaching her.

=== 2008: Olympic and World success ===
Cooke joined Team Halfords Bikehut for 2008. The team was formed by Dave Brailsford with the aim of developing British cyclists with medal-winning potential. Cooke was at the forefront of those ambitions with the forthcoming Olympics a major target. She finished 20th at the Trofeo Alfredo Binda, 16th at the Ronde van Vlaanderen, 12th at the Magali Pache time trial, and eighth at La Flèche Wallonne. She also placed third at the Grande Boucle. Cooke stated that she was happy with her form ahead of the upcoming Olympic Games, saying she was intentionally riding a light schedule with the aim of peaking in the summer. Her first victory of the year came at the Tour de l'Aude, in which she rode with the Great Britain national team. She secured the first stage, and finished fourth overall. In June, Cooke won the National Road Race Championship for an eighth consecutive time.

At the 2008 Summer Olympics in Beijing, Cooke won gold in the women's road race—the 200th gold for Great Britain at an Olympic Games. She formed part of a five-women breakaway, and beat Emma Johansson and Tatiana Guderzo in a sprint at the end of the race. Her gold was the first by a Welsh Olympian since equestrian Richard Meade in 1972, the first individual gold medal for a female Welsh Olympian, and the first Olympic gold medal in any cycling discipline by a British female cyclist. Cooke then finished 15th in the time-trial, over two minutes behind the gold medallist.

At the 2008 World Championships, Cooke became the first cyclist, male or female, of any nation, to become the road race world champion and Olympic gold medallist in the same year. The race in Italy culminated in a sprint where she overcame Vos and Judith Arndt in a sprint finish. The three medallists were part of a five-rider breakaway that attacked on the final lap. Cooke was appointed Member of the Order of the British Empire (MBE) in the 2009 New Year Honours. She was awarded the Transworld Sport Female Athlete of the Year, the Pat Besford award for 'Performance of the Year' by the Sports Journalists' Association, and the Sunday Times Sportswoman of the Year for her achievements in 2008. Cooke was also a nominee for the BBC Sports Personality of the Year Award. In October that year, Cooke's book, Cycle for life was published. It offered advice to anyone taking up the sport.

=== Later career: 2009–2012 ===
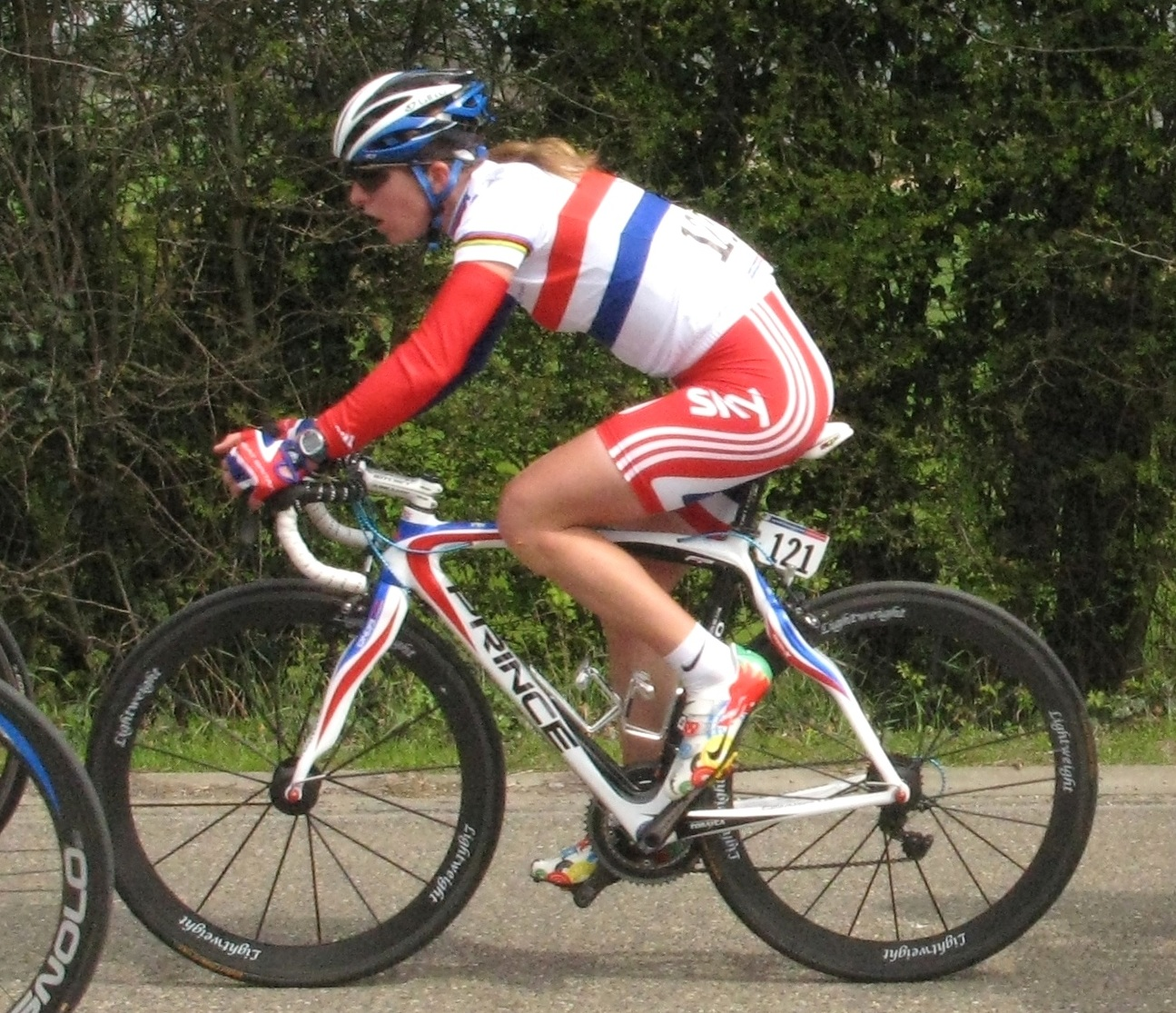
Cooke wearing the British National Road Race Champion's jersey in the 2010 Flèche Wallonne Féminine, a race she won on three occasions, 2003, 2005 & 2006.

Following Halfords' decision to end their sponsorship for the women's team, Cooke formed her own team, Vision1 Racing, with the ambition of developing young British riders. In 2009, Cooke captured the Giro del Trentino title, and won her tenth British National Road Race Championships title. In July, she withdrew from the Thüringen-Rundfahrt with illness. She blamed her ill health on the stress of running her own team, and said she was considering the team's future. She had struggled to find sponsorship, and was self-funding the project. The team's manager Stefan Wyman had departed, and Cooke stated: "It is not possible to manage a team and be a cyclist at the same time". Vision1 Racing finished seventh in the 2009 UCI Team Rankings, but Cooke disbanded the team.

Cooke signed for Equipe Nurnberg Versicherung for 2010, but due to the loss of key sponsorship, she chose to race and train with the British national team instead for the upcoming season. She won stage three at the Iurreta-Emakumeen Bira. At the 2010 Commonwealth Games, Cooke placed fifth in the women's road race, and at the 2010 UCI Road World Championships in Geelong, she finished fourth in the same event. In the latter, Cooke and Arndt held a 13-second advantage with 3 km remaining, but the pair were caught inside the final 200 m and Cooke missed out on a medal in the ensuing sprint. At the British National Road Race Championships, she was beaten into third place by Emma Pooley and Lizzie Armitstead. Cooke called the race "unfair", saying that Pooley, Armitstead, and Sharon Laws had teamed up against her. She had won the previous nine editions of the race.

In November 2010, Cooke joined the Mcipollini-Giordana team for 2011. That year, she won stage five of the Giro D'Italia, finished runner-up to Armitstead at the British National Road Race Championships, and took fourth place in the road race at the 2011 World Championships in Copenhagen. She had started the World Championships expecting to support Armitstead, but after the latter was caught behind a late crash, Cooke rode for herself and was beaten in a bunch sprint. Armitstead was upset with Cooke afterwards, saying that Cooke was not a team player.

Riding for the Faren-Honda team in 2012, Cooke won stage five of the Energiewacht Tour in the Netherlands, ending the race in 59th position overall. At the 2012 Summer Olympics in London, she competed in the road race, finishing 31st. During the race, she was dropped by the front-three riders and ended in the chasing pack. Her role was also to support team-leader Armitstead who finished in silver. In the road race at the 2012 World Championships in Limburg, Cooke finished 60th, over five minutes behind the winner.

Cooke announced her retirement from the sport on 14 January 2013 at the age of 29. She said that her dreams had been fulfilled. In 2014, she was inducted into the British Cycling Hall of Fame.

=== Post retirement: Views on doping and sexism in cycling ===
In March 2014, Cooke was reported to be studying for an MBA at Cardiff University. Her autobiography, The Breakaway, was published in the summer of 2014. The Guardian's Richard Williams described it as "a compelling and salutary account of the price she paid for the victories from which many others will benefit". It was named The Sunday Times Sports Book of the Year 2014, and long listed for the William Hill Sports Book of the Year prize.

Since retirement, Cooke has spoken out campaigning for gender equality in sport and stronger investigatory powers for the anti-doping bodies. In January 2017, Cooke gave written and oral evidence to the Parliamentary Select Committee for the Culture, Media and Sport inquiry into Combatting Doping in Sport and stated that her information about doping in cycling, given as evidence to UK Anti-Doping (UKAD) was subsequently not investigated by UKAD. She also spoke out about the endemic sexism she encountered in sport. The Independent stated: "Nicole Cooke has issued a damning attack on British Cycling and Team Sky, condemning the governing bodies for their lack of accountability, sexism, and failure to fight the abuse of performance enhancing drugs (PEDs) within the sport".

Cooke believes that she was cheated out of race victories by dopers during her career, called Lance Armstrong a "criminal", and said he should have gone to prison. Cooke said she felt understrength during her first Tour de France, and has stated that her team asked her which "medicines" she wanted to take in order to make her stronger. She says she was told that she was not matching the teams' expectations in the race, but she refused to take any.In 2013, she described the decision to cancel the women's Tour de France as a waste of potential for the sport. Cooke has stated that prior to the 2012 Summer Olympics, a partnership between Mclaren and British Cycling to produce cutting-edge bike technology resulted in the development of bikes for the men's team only. In 2017, she called on the BBC to give equal coverage to men's and women's sport.

Cooke appeared in the 2017 series of Christmas University Challenge representing Cardiff University.

== Major results (podium finishes) ==
=== Cyclo-cross ===
1999–2000
2nd National Championships
2000–2001
1st National Championships

=== Mountain bike ===
2000
3rd Cross-country, UCI World Junior Championships
2001
1st Cross-country, UCI World Junior Championships

=== Road ===
1999
1st Road race, National Championships
2000
1st Road race, UCI World Junior Championships
2001
UCI World Junior Championships

1st Road race
1st Time trial

1st Road race, National Championships
Grand Prix de Quebec

1st Young rider classification
1st Mountains Classification

2002
1st Road race, Commonwealth Games
1st Road race, National Championships
1st Trofeo Citta di Rosignano
1st Memorial Pasquale de Carlo
1st Ronde van Westerbeek
1st Young rider classification, Giro della Toscana
1st Young rider classification, Giro del Trentino
Trofeo Banca Popolare

1st Mountains classification
1st Stage 2

3rd Overall Tour Midi Pyrenees

1st Mountains classification
1st Stage 2

3rd Veulta Castilla-y-Leon
2003
1st Overall UCI World Cup
1st Road race, National Championships
1st Amstel Gold Race
1st La Flèche Wallonne
1st GP de Plouay
1st GP San Francisco
Giro della Toscana

1st Young rider classification
1st Stage 3a

1st Stage 5 Holland Ladies Tour
1st Mountains classification, Vuelta Castilla y Leon
1st Young rider classification, Trofeo Banco Populare Alto Adige
3rd Road race, UCI World Championships
2004
1st Road race, National Championships
1st Giro d'Italia Femminile

1st Stage 8

1st GP San Francisco
Giro della Toscana

1st Points classification
1st Young rider classification

2005
1st Road race, National Championships
1st La Flèche Wallonne
1st Grand Prix de Wallonie
1st Trofeo Alfredo Binda
1st Trofeo Citta di Rosignano
1st Stage 5 Holland Ladies Tour
1st Stage 1a Giro della Toscana
2nd Road race, UCI World Championships
2006
1st Overall UCI World Cup
1st Road race, National Championships
1st Overall Grande Boucle Féminine Internationale

1st Stages 1 & 2

1st Overall Thüringen Rundfahrt

1st Stages 2, 4a, 4b & 5

1st La Flèche Wallonne
1st GP Castilla y León
1st The Ladies Golden Hour
1st Magali Pache TT
1st Mountains classification, Tour of New Zealand
1st Points classification, Giro della Toscana
2nd Open de Suède Vårgårda
2nd Coupe du Monde Cycliste Féminine de Montréal
3rd GP de Plouay
3rd Road race, UCI World Championships
3rd Road race, Commonwealth Games
2007
1st Road race, National Championships
1st Overall Grande Boucle Féminine Internationale
1st Tour of Flanders
1st Geelong
1st Trofeo Alfredo Binda
1st GP Costa Etrusca
2nd Overall UCI World Cup
2nd GP de Plouay
2nd La Flèche Wallonne
2008
1st Road race, Olympic Games
1st Road race, UCI World Championships
1st Road race, National Championships
1st Stage 1 Tour de l'Aude
2009
1st Road race, National Championships
1st Overall Giro del Trentino

1st Stage 2

Iurreta-Emakumeen Bira

1st Stages 2 & 3b

2010
1st Stage 3 Emakumeen Bira
2nd La Flèche Wallonne
3rd Road race, National Championships
2011
1st Stage 5 Giro d'Italia Femminile
2nd Road race, National Championships
2012
1st Stage 5 Energiewacht Tour

Sporting positions
Preceded by (Australia) Anna Millward	UCI Women's Road World Cup Champion; 2003	Succeeded by (Australia) Oenone Wood
Preceded by (Australia) Oenone Wood	UCI Women's Road World Cup Champion; 2006	Succeeded by (Netherlands) Marianne Vos
