= Erika Vilūnaitė =

Lithuanian cyclist (born 1980)

Personal information
- Born: 25 December 1980 (age 45) Utena, Lithuania

Cycling career
- Sport: Cycling
- Discipline: Road cycling

Professional teams
- 2006: Bianchi Alverti Kookai
- 2009: S.C. Michela Fanini Rox
- 2010: Fenixs-Petrogradets

Erika Vilūnaitė (born 25 December 1980) is a road cyclist from Lithuania. She represented her nation at the 1998 and 2005 UCI Road World Championships.
