= Karolina Konieczna =

Polish cyclist

Personal information
- Born: Poland

Cycling career
- Sport: Cycling
- Discipline: Road cycling

Karolina Konieczna is a road cyclist from Poland who represented her nation at the 2006 UCI Road World Championships, finishing 85th in the women's race.
