= Camila Ayala =

Argentinian bicycle racer

Personal information
- Born: Argentina

Cycling career
- Sport: Cycling
- Disciplines: Road cycling, Track cycling

Camila Ayala is a track and road cyclist from Argentina. She represented her nation at the 2005 UCI Road World Championships.
