= Ma Sufen =

Chinese cyclist

Personal information
- Born: 28 January 1987 (age 39) China

Cycling career
- Sport: Cycling
- Discipline: Road cycling

Professional team
- 2008–2009: Giant Pro Cycling

Ma Sufen (Chinese: 马素芬, born 28 January 1987) is a road cyclist from China. She represented her nation at the 2007 UCI Road World Championships.
