= Swissman triathlon =

Sports competition in Switzerland

The Swissman triathlon (officially SWISSMAN Xtreme Triathlon) is a non-Ironman branded triathlon, point to point, race held in Switzerland annually. The distances are equivalent to those of an Ironman race with the 3,8 km swim taking place in Lake Maggiore (altitude 196 m). At the town of Ascona the competitors transition onto their bikes and then cycle 180 km through the mountains, passing three major mountain passes, the Gotthard Pass, the Furka Pass and the Grimsel Pass, with Furka as the highest reaching 2,436 meters above sea level. After the second transition, at Brienz (altitude 567 m), the competitors then run 42.2 km uphill to the village of Kleine Scheidegg at 2,061 m altitude.

== Winners ==
Year	Men's winner	Country/State	Time	Women's winner	Country/State	Time
2013	Markus Stierli	Switzerland	11:29	Emma Pooley	United Kingdom	12:38
2014
2015
2016
2017	Alain Friederich		11:57	Tabea Ruegge	Switzerland	14:20
2018	Michał Rajca^{1}	Poland	11:27			
