= Johanna Buick =

New Zealand cyclist

Personal information
- Born: New Zealand

Cycling career
- Sport: Cycling
- Discipline: Road cycling

Johanna Buick is a road cyclist from New Zealand. She represented her nation at the 2005 UCI Road World Championships.
