= 2007 UCI Women's Road World Cup =

Series of bicycle races

- Tenth edition of the UCI Women's Road World Cup

Details
- Dates: 3 March – 16 September
- Location: Australia, Canada and Europe
- Races: 9

Champions
- Individual champion: Marianne Vos (NED) (Team DSB Bank)
- Teams' champion: Raleigh–Lifeforce–Creation HB Pro Cycling Team

The 2007 UCI Women's Road World Cup was the tenth edition of the UCI Women's Road World Cup. Eight of the twelve races from the 2006 World Cup were retained and one new race was added to give a total of nine races. The races that were left off the calendar were the New Zealand World Cup, GP Castilla y Leon, L'Heure D'Or Féminine and the Lowland International Rotterdam Tour. The Dutch race the Ronde van Drenthe was the sole addition.

== Races ==
	Date	Race	Country	Winner	Team
#1	3 March	Geelong World Cup	Australia	Nicole Cooke (GBR)	Raleigh–Lifeforce–Creation HB Pro Cycling Team
#2	8 April	Tour of Flanders for Women	Belgium	Nicole Cooke (GBR)	Raleigh–Lifeforce–Creation HB Pro Cycling Team
#3	12 April	Ronde van Drenthe	Netherlands	Adrie Visser (NED)	Team DSB Bank
#4	25 April	La Flèche Wallonne Féminine	Belgium	Marianne Vos (NED)	Team DSB Bank
#5	13 May	Tour de Berne	Switzerland	Edita Pučinskaitė (LTU)	Equipe Nürnberger Versicherung
#6	2 June	Coupe du Monde Cycliste Féminine de Montréal	Canada	Fabiana Luperini (ITA)	Menikini Gysko
#7	5 August	Open de Suède Vårgårda	Sweden	Chantal Beltman (NED)	Team High Road Women
#8	1 September	GP de Plouay	France	Noemi Cantele (ITA)	Bigla Cycling Team
#9	16 September	Rund um die Nürnberger Altstadt	Germany	Marianne Vos (NED)	Team DSB Bank

== UCI Women's Teams ==
UCI Code	Team name	Country
EHN	Elk Haus	Austria
UNG	Team Uniqa	Austria
VLL	Vlaanderen–Caprisonne–T Interim	Belgium
LBL	Lotto–Belisol Ladiesteam	Belgium
ECC	Team Expresscopy.com	Canada
POC	Pratomagno Colombia	Colombia
DGC	Team CMAX Dila–Guerciotti–Cogeas	El Salvador
BPD	Bizkaia–Panda Software–Durango	Spain
CVA	Valencian Community	Spain
FUT	Vienne Futuroscope	France
TPF	Team Pro Feminin du Genevois	France
ESG	Entente Sportive Gervais Lilas 93 (ESGL93)	France
LPA	Les Pruneaux d'Agen	France
GRT	Global Racing Team	United Kingdom
RAC	Rapha/Condor	United Kingdom
NUR	Equipe Nürnberger Versicherung	Germany
TMP	T-Mobile Women	Germany
TGH	Team Getränke-Hoffmann	Germany
GPC	Giant Pro Cycling	Hong Kong
FRW	A.S. Team F.R.W	Italy
FEN	Fenixs–HPB	Italy

UCI Code	Team name	Country
SAF	Safi–Pasta Zara–Manhattan	Italy
USC	USC Chirio Forno d'Asolo	Italy
MGT	Menikini Gysko	Italy
SEM	Saccarelli Emu Sea Marsciano	Italy
MIC	S.C. Michela Fanini Record Rox	Italy
TOG	Top Girls Fassa Bortolo Raxy Line	Italy
TSC	Therme Skin Care	Netherlands
AAD	AA-Drink Cycling Team	Netherlands
DSB	Team DSB Bank	Netherlands
VVP	Vrienden van het Platteland	Netherlands
FLX	Team Flexpoint	Netherlands
PAQ	POL–Aqua	Poland
PRI	Primus	Poland
PTG	Petrogradets	Russia
RLT	Raleigh–Lifeforce–Creation HB Pro Cycling Team	Switzerland
BCT	Bigla Cycling Team	Switzerland
TSW	Team Specialized Designs for Women	Switzerland
LIP	Team Lipton	United States
CRW	Cheerwine	United States
COL	Colavita/Sutter Home Presented By Cooking Light	United States
VBR	Verducci Breakaway Racing	United States

== Point standings ==
=== Points system ===
- Riders earned points as follows:

Place	1st	2nd	3rd	4th	5th	6th	7th	8th	9th	10th	11th	12th	13th	14th	15th	16th	17th	18th	19th	20th
Points	75	50	35	30	27	24	21	18	15	11	10	9	8	7	6	5	4	3	2	1

- Teams earned the points of their best placed four riders.
- The final round earned double points

=== Individuals ===
Final standings (last updated on September 16, 2007).

Place	Country	Rider	Team	1	2	3	4	5	6	7	8	9	Total
1	Netherlands	Marianne Vos	DSB	–	35	35	75	50	30	11	21	150	407
2	United Kingdom	Nicole Cooke	RLT	75	75	21	50	30	27	9	50	0	337
3	Germany	Ina Teutenberg	TMP	30	0	30	–	–	–	–	0	100	160
4	Italy	Noemi Cantele	BCT	–	0	0	0	0	–	35	75	42	152
5	Australia	Oenone Wood	TMP	50	0	–	0	35	24	0	30	0	139
6	Italy	Fabiana Luperini	MSG	–	0	–	15	–	75	18	0	–	108
7	Germany	Trixi Worrack	NUR	18	30	0	3	0	18	7	10	14	100
8	Australia	Rochelle Gilmore	MSG	0	–	24	–	11	0	–	0	60	95
9	Germany	Regina Scheicher	NUR	21	0	0	–	0	0	–	0	70	91
10	Lithuania	Edita Pučinskaitė	NUR	0	0	0	1	75	–	–	4	0	80

=== Teams ===
Final standings (last updated on September 1, 2007).

Place	UCI Code	Team Name	Points
1	RLT	Raleigh–Lifeforce–Creation HB Pro Cycling Team	504
2	DSB	Team DSB Bank	377
3	TMP	T-Mobile Women	377
4	NUR	Equipe Nürnberger Versicherung	320
5	MSG	Menikini–Selle Italia–Gysko	226
6	BCT	Bigla Cycling Team	199
7	FLX	Team Flexpoint	136
8	AAD	AA-Drink Cycling Team	88
9	ITA	Italy	75
10	AUS	Australia	65

- Teams earned the points of their best placed four riders.
- The final round earned double points
