= Lyubov Dombitskaya =

Kazakhstani cyclist

Personal information
- Born: 17 May 1987 (age 39) Kazakhstan

Cycling career
- Sport: Cycling
- Discipline: Road cycling

Lyubov Dombitskaya (born 17 May 1987) is a road cyclist from Kazakhstan. She represented her nation at the 2007 UCI Road World Championships.
