= Magalie Finot-Laivier =

French cyclist

Personal information
- Born: 20 January 1973 (age 53) France

Cycling career
- Sport: Cycling
- Discipline: Road cycling

Professional team
- 2008: Team Pro Féminin Les Carroz

Magalie Finot-Laivier (born 20 January 1973) is a road cyclist from France. She represented her nation at the 2005 UCI Road World Championships.

== Career ==
She has achieved two victories in UCI-sanctioned races, competed with Team Pro Féminin Les Carroz during the 2008 season.
