= Valentina Gavrilova =

Russian road cyclist

Valentina Gavrilova (Валентина Гаврилова in Russian)
Personal information
- Born: 14 June 1985 (age 41) Russia

Cycling career
- Sport: Cycling
- Discipline: Road cycling

Valentina Gavrilova (born 14 June 1985) is a road cyclist from Russia. She represented her nation at the 2006 UCI Road World Championships.
