= Anna Skawinska =

Polish cyclist

Personal information
- Born: 19 January 1981 (age 45) Poland

Cycling career
- Sport: Cycling
- Discipline: Road cycling

Anna Skawinska is a road cyclist from Poland. She represented her nation at the 1998, 2000, 2002, 2003 and 2005 UCI Road World Championships.
