= Lynette Jansen =

South African cyclist

Lynette Jansen Van Vuuren
Personal information
- Born: South Africa

Cycling career
- Sport: Cycling
- Discipline: Road cycling

Lynette Jansen Van Vuuren is a road cyclist from South Africa. She represented her nation at the 2006 UCI Road World Championships.
