= Karen Steurs =

Belgian cyclist

Personal information
- Full name: Karen Steurs
- Born: 27 August 1979 (age 47) Schoten, Belgium

Cycling career
- Sport: Cycling
- Role: Rider

Karen Steurs (born 27 August 1979) is a former Belgian racing cyclist. She finished second place in the Belgian National Road Race Championships in 2006.
