= Tanja Slater =

British cyclist

Personal information
- Born: 9 May 1978 (age 48) United Kingdom
- Height: 1.66 m (5 ft 5 in)
- Weight: 58 kg (128 lb)

Cycling career
- Sport: Cycling
- Discipline: Road cycling

Professional team
- 2007: Raleigh-Lifeforce-Creation

Tanja Slater (born 9 May 1978) is a road cyclist from United Kingdom. She represented her nation at the 2007 UCI Road World Championships.

Slater is married and has a BSc Hons, Sport & Exercise Science.
