= Adriana Lovera =

Venezuelan road cyclist

Adriana Lovera Varela
Personal information
- Born: 20 September 1985 (age 41) Venezuela

Cycling career
- Sport: Cycling
- Discipline: Road cycling

Adriana Lovera Varela (born 20 September 1985) is a road cyclist from Venezuela. She represented her nation at the 2008 UCI Road World Championships.
