= Vladimíra Krásová =

IFBB Pro bikini competitor

- Professional bodybuilder

Personal info
- Born: August 19, 1986 (age 39); Prague, Czechoslovakia

Best statistics
- Height: 1.73 m (5 ft 8 in)
- Weight: 57 kg (126 lb)

Professional (Pro) career
- Pro-debut: Pittsburgh Pro; 2013
- Best win: EVL's Prague Pro; 2013
- Predecessor: Justine Munro

Vladimíra "Vlaďka" Krásová is a Czech IFBB Pro fitness and figure competitor (bikini category).

Krásová began training for bikini competition two years before her professional career and became the Czech Republic Champion in May 2012. In October 2012, she participated in the Amateur Bikini Olympia competition of the inaugural EVL's Prague Pro and became the first, also winning her IFBB Pro card. Her standing in the Bikini Olympia was low (16th place) but in October 2013, she won the EVL's Prague Bikini Pro competition.
