= Michelle Hyland =

New Zealand cyclist

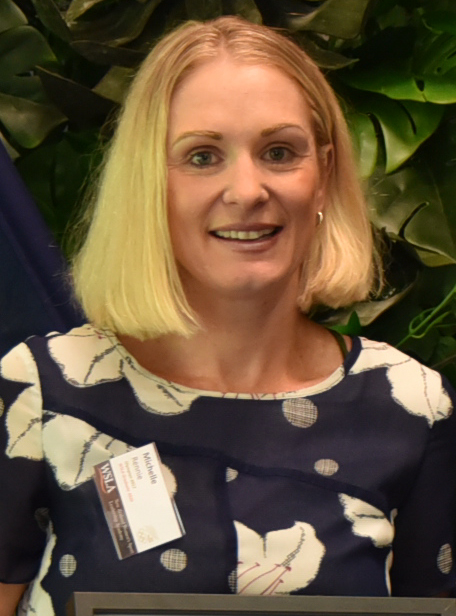
- Hyland (now Rennie) in 2020

Personal information
- Born: 29 March 1984 (age 42) Gisborne, New Zealand

Cycling career
- Sport: Cycling
- Discipline: Road cycling

Michelle Hyland (now Rennie; born 29 March 1984) is a road cyclist from New Zealand. She represented her nation at the 2004 Summer Olympics in the women's road race. She also rode at the 2005 and 2007 UCI Road World Championships.
