= Karin Aune =

Swedish cyclist

Personal information
- Born: 29 April 1975 (age 51) Sweden

Cycling career
- Sport: Cycling
- Discipline: Road cycling

Professional teams
- 2007: Menikini-Selle Italia-Gysko
- 2008: Team Uniqa
- 2011-2012: S.C. Michela Fanini Rox

Karin Aune (born 29 April 1975) is a road cyclist from Sweden. She represented her nation at the 2006 and 2008 UCI Road World Championships.
