= Monika Krawczyk =

Polish cyclist

Personal information
- Born: Poland

Cycling career
- Sport: Cycling
- Discipline: Road cycling

Monika Krawczyk is a road cyclist from Poland. She represented her nation at the 2005 and 2006 UCI Road World Championships.
