= Sofie Goor =

Belgian cyclist

Personal information
- Born: 14 January 1977 (age 49) Belgium

Cycling career
- Sport: Cycling
- Discipline: Road cycling

Professional teams
- 2005–2007: Vlaanderen-Capri Sonne-T-Interim
- 2008: Lotto Belisol Ladiesteam

Sofie Goor (born 14 January 1977) is a road cyclist from Belgium. She represented her nation at the 2007 UCI Road World Championships.
