= Monika Grzebinoga =

Polish cyclist

Personal information
- Born: 1 March 1985 (age 41) Poland

Cycling career
- Sport: Cycling
- Discipline: Road cycling

Professional teams
- 2007–2008: Primus
- 2008-: POL-Aqua

Monika Grzebinoga (born 1 March 1985) is a road cyclist from Poland. She represented her nation at the 2006, 2007, 2008 and 2009 UCI Road World Championships.
