= Siobhan Dervan =

Irish racing cyclist (born 1978)

Siobhan Dervan-Horgan
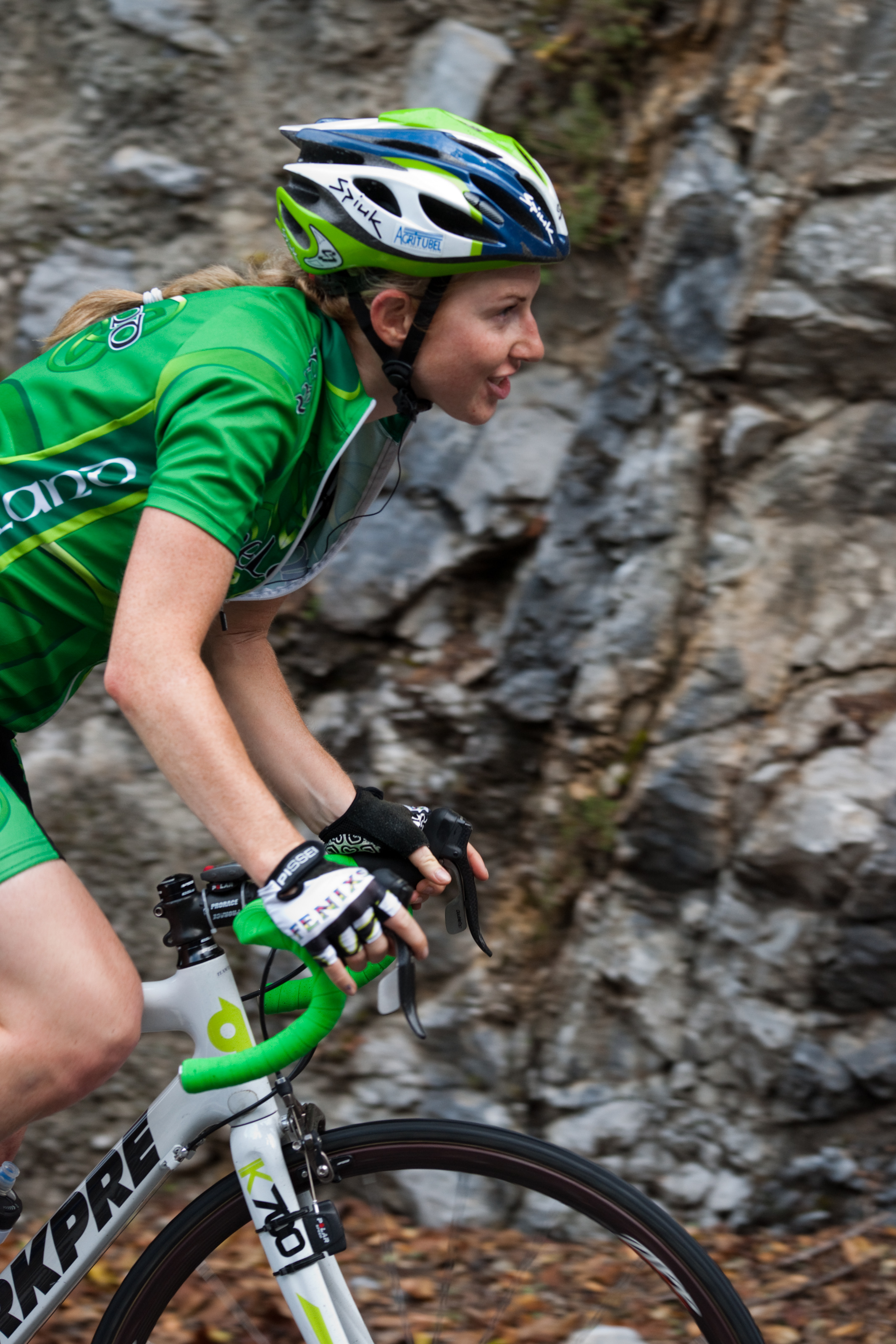

Personal information
- Born: Siobhan Dervan; 22 December 1978 (age 47) Republic of Ireland

Cycling career
- Sport: Cycling
- Current team: Retired
- Disciplines: Road; Track
- Role: Rider
- Rider type: Climber

Amateur team
- 2015: Team Aquablue

Professional teams
- 2006–2007: Lotto–Belisol Ladiesteam
- 2008–2009: Fenixs
- 2010–2012: ESGL 93-GSD Gestion

Siobhan Dervan-Horgan (born 22 December 1978) is an Irish former racing cyclist. She is a former Irish National Road Race Champion, a title which she won for four consecutive years from 2005 to 2008. Dervan finished 24th in the 2008 UCI Women's Road Race World Championships, an improvement on her 67th position the previous year. She did not finish the 2009 edition. In January 2011 she joined the Irish team pursuit squad in their bid to qualify for the 2012 Olympic Games. She has competed in a number of triathlons and placed 10th in the European Duathlon Championships in 2014.

== Personal life ==
Siobhan Dervan married John Horgan in January 2009.

== Major results ==
2004
1st Time trial, National Road Championships
2005
1st Road race, National Road Championships
2006
1st Road race, National Road Championships
2007
1st Road race, National Road Championships
2008
1st Road race, National Road Championships
2010
2nd Road race, National Road Championships
3rd Classic Féminine Vienne Poitou-Charentes
2011
1st Road race, National Road Championships
Coupe de France Dames

2nd Grand Prix du Morbihan Féminin
2nd GP de Nogent l'Abbesse

2012
National Road Championships

2nd Road race
3rd Time trial

2015
1st Time trial, National Road Championships
