= Felicia Greer =

Canadian cyclist

Felicia Gomez Greer
Personal information
- Born: 26 January 1970 (age 56) Canada

Cycling career
- Sport: Cycling
- Discipline: Road cycling

Felicia Greer is a former road cyclist from Canada. She represented her nation at the 2005 and 2008 UCI Road World Championships.
