= Iosune Murillo Elkano =

Spanish cyclist

Personal information
- Born: 14 May 1980 (age 46) Spain

Cycling career
- Sport: Cycling
- Discipline: Road cycling

Professional team
- 2008: Bizkaia–Durango

Iosune Murillo Elkano (born 14 May 1980) is a Spanish road cyclist. She represented her nation at the 2008 UCI Road World Championships.
