= Kateryna Krasova =

Ukrainian cyclist

Personal information
- Born: Ukraine

Cycling career
- Sport: Cycling
- Discipline: Road cycling

Kateryna Krasova is a road cyclist from Ukraine. She represented her nation at the 2005, 2006 and 2007 UCI Road World Championships.
