= 2005 UCI Road World Championships =

Cycling world championships

- Location within Spain
- Venue: Madrid, Spain
- Date: 19–25 September 2005
- Coordinates: 40°25′0″N 3°43′0″W
- Events: 6

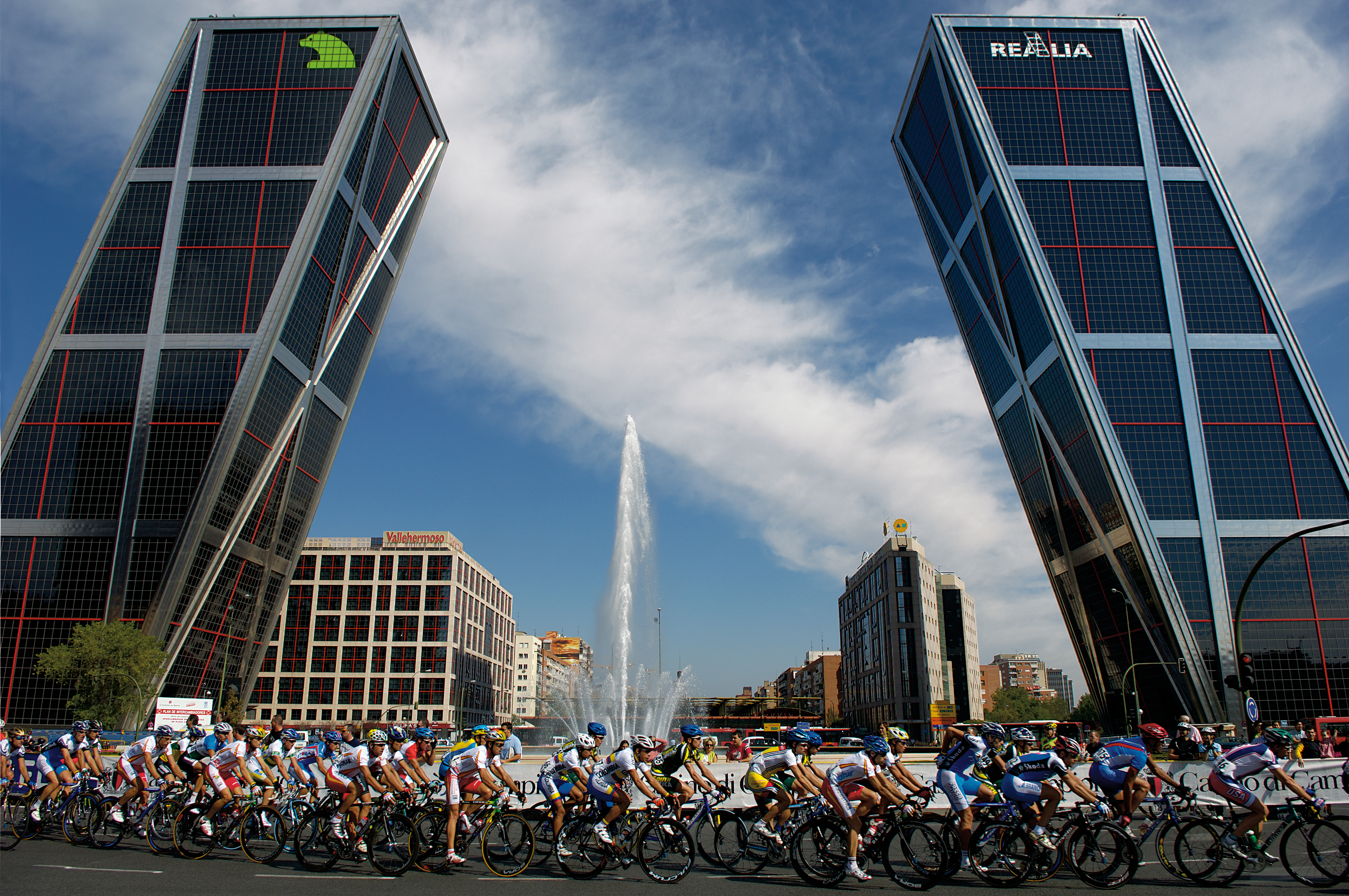
Men's race passing by Plaza de Castilla and Gate of Europe.

The 2005 UCI Road World Championships took place in Madrid, Spain, between September 19 and September 25, 2005. The event consisted of a road race and a time trial for men, women and men under 23.

The Men's road race saw Belgian cyclist Tom Boonen winning.

== Events summary ==
Event	Gold		Silver		Bronze	
Men's Events
Men's road race	Tom Boonen; Belgium	6h26'10"	Alejandro Valverde; Spain	s.t.	Anthony Geslin; France	s.t.
Men's time trial	Michael Rogers; Australia	53'34"	Iván Gutiérrez; Spain	+ 23"	Fabian Cancellara; Switzerland	s.t.
Women's Events
Women's road race	Regina Schleicher; Germany	3h08'52"	Nicole Cooke; Great Britain	s.t.	Oenone Wood; Australia	s.t.
Women's time trial	Karin Thürig; Switzerland	28'51"	Joane Somarriba; Spain	+ 5"	Kristin Armstrong; United States	+ 39"
Men's Under-23 Events
Men's under-23 road race	Dimitry Grabovsky; Ukraine	3h26'23"	William Walker; Australia	+ 26"	Yevgeni Popov; Russia	s.t.
Men's under-23 time trial	Mikhail Ignatiev; Russia	47'24"	Dmytro Grabovskyy; Ukraine	+ 34"	Peter Latham; New Zealand	+ 37"

== Medals table ==
Place	Nation	1st place, gold medalist(s)	2nd place, silver medalist(s)	3rd place, bronze medalist(s)	Total
1	Australia	1	1	1	3
2	Ukraine	1	1	0	2
3	Switzerland	1	0	1	2
3	Russia	1	0	1	2
5	Belgium	1	0	0	1
5	Germany	1	0	0	1
7	Spain	0	3	0	3
8	Great Britain	0	1	0	1
9	France	0	0	1	1
9	New Zealand	0	0	1	1
9	United States	0	0	1	1
Total		6	6	6	18

Participating National Federations
- Argentina
- Australia
- Austria
- Belarus
- Belgium
- Brazil
- Bulgaria
- Canada
- Colombia
- Croatia
- Czech Republic
- Denmark
- Estonia
- France
- Germany
- United Kingdom
- Iran
- Ireland
- Italy
- Japan
- Kazakhstan
- Latvia
- Lithuania
- Luxembourg
- Netherlands
- New Zealand
- Norway
- Poland
- Portugal
- Russia
- Slovakia
- Slovenia
- South Africa
- Spain
- Sweden
- Switzerland
- Ukraine
- United States
- Uzbekistan
- Venezuela
