= 2007 UCI Road World Championships =

Cycling world championships

- Venue: Stuttgart, Germany
- Date: 25–30 September 2007
- Coordinates: 48°46′55″N 9°11′2″E
- Nations participating: 59
- Events: 6

The 2007 UCI Road World Championships took place in Stuttgart, Germany, between September 25 and September 30, 2007. The event consisted of a road race and a time trial for men, women and men under 23. Italian Paolo Bettini and Swiss Fabian Cancellara both won their second world championships in a row in the elite men's road race and time trial respectively.

== Participating nations ==
Cyclists from 59 national federations participated. The number of cyclists per nation that competed is shown in parentheses.

Participating nations
Click on a nation to go to that nation's UCI Road World Championships page.
- Algeria
- Argentina
- Australia
- Austria
- Belarus
- Belgium
- Brazil (10)
- Bulgaria
- Canada
- China
- Colombia
- Croatia (7)
- Czech Republic
- Denmark
- El Salvador (1)
- Estonia
- Finland (2)
- France
- Germany
- Great Britain
- Greece (2)
- Hungary
- Iran
- Ireland
- Italy
- Japan
- Kazakhstan
- Kenya (1)
- Kyrgyzstan (1)
- Latvia
- Liechtenstein (1)
- Lithuania
- Luxembourg (9)
- Malaysia (6)
- Mauritius (1)
- Mexico (4)
- Moldova
- Namibia (2)
- Netherlands (25)
- New Zealand
- Norway
- Poland
- Portugal
- Romania (1)
- Russia
- Serbia
- Slovakia
- Slovenia
- South Africa
- South Korea
- Spain
- Sweden
- Switzerland
- Thailand (3)
- Tunisia
- Ukraine
- United States
- Uzbekistan
- Venezuela

== Events summary ==
Event	Gold		Silver		Bronze	
Men's events
Men's road race	Paolo Bettini; Italy	6:44:43	Alexandr Kolobnev; Russia	s.t.	Stefan Schumacher; Germany	s.t.
Men's time trial	Fabian Cancellara; Switzerland	55:41.35	László Bodrogi; Hungary	56:33.41	Stef Clement; Netherlands	56:39.06
Women's events
Women's road race	Marta Bastianelli; Italy	3:46:34	Marianne Vos; Netherlands	3:46:40	Giorgia Bronzini; Italy	s.t.
Women's time trial	Hanka Kupfernagel; Germany	34:43.79	Kristin Armstrong; United States	35:07.26	Christiane Soeder; Austria	35:25.32
Men's under-23 events
Men's under-23 road race	Peter Velits; Slovakia	4:21:22	Wesley Sulzberger; Australia	s.t.	Jonathan Bellis; Great Britain	s.t.
Men's under-23 time trial	Lars Boom; Netherlands	48:57.93	Mikhail Ignatiev; Russia	49:05.99	Jérôme Coppel; France	49:43.52

== Medals table ==
Place	Nation	1st place, gold medalist(s)	2nd place, silver medalist(s)	3rd place, bronze medalist(s)	Total
1	Italy	2	0	1	3
2	Netherlands	1	1	1	3
3	Germany	1	0	1	2
4	Slovakia	1	0	0	1
4	Switzerland	1	0	0	1
6	Russia	0	2	0	2
7	Australia	0	1	0	1
7	Hungary	0	1	0	1
7	United States	0	1	0	1
10	Austria	0	0	1	1
10	France	0	0	1	1
10	Great Britain	0	0	1	1
Total		6	6	6	18

== Gallery ==
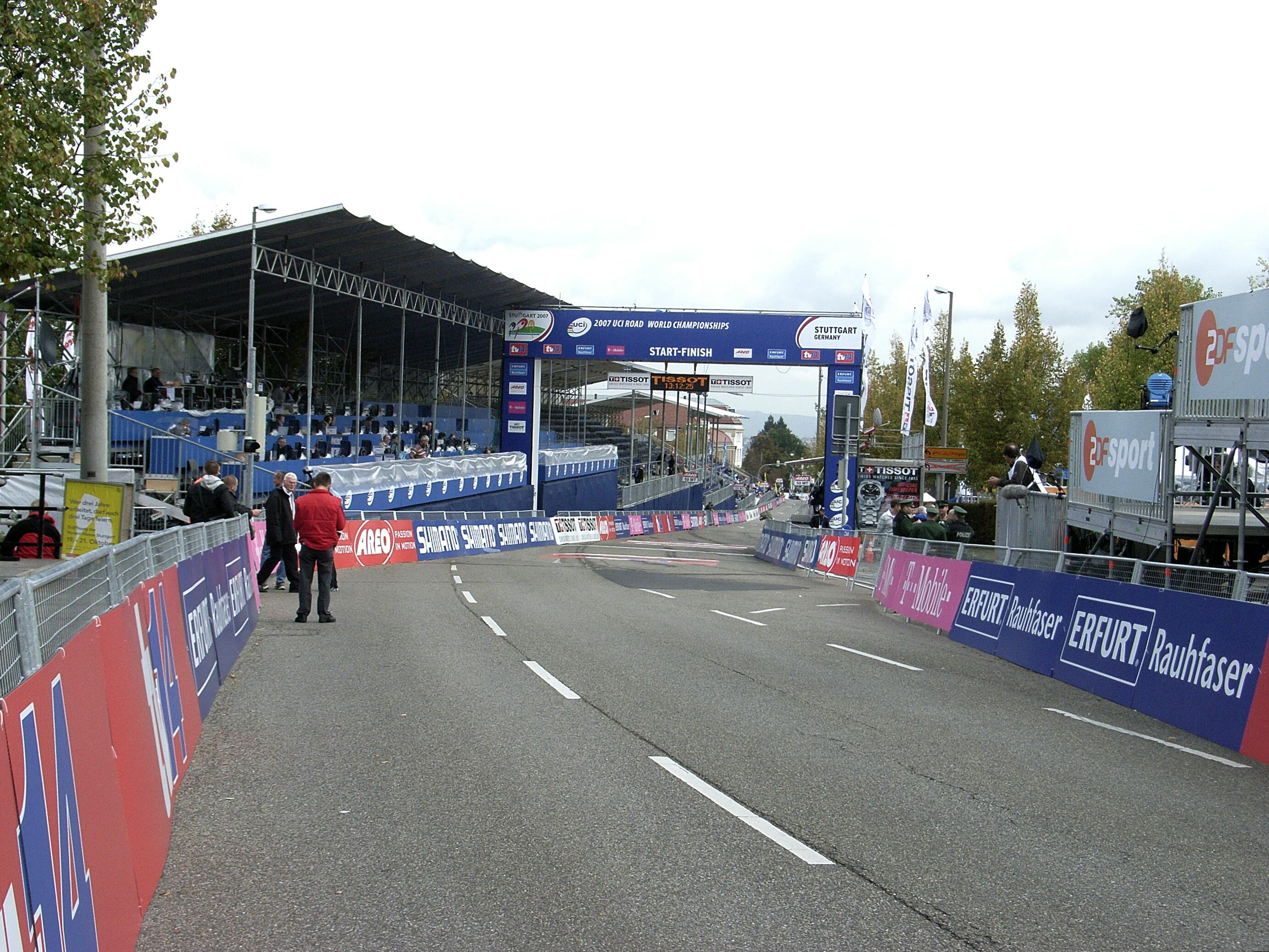
Start and finish line

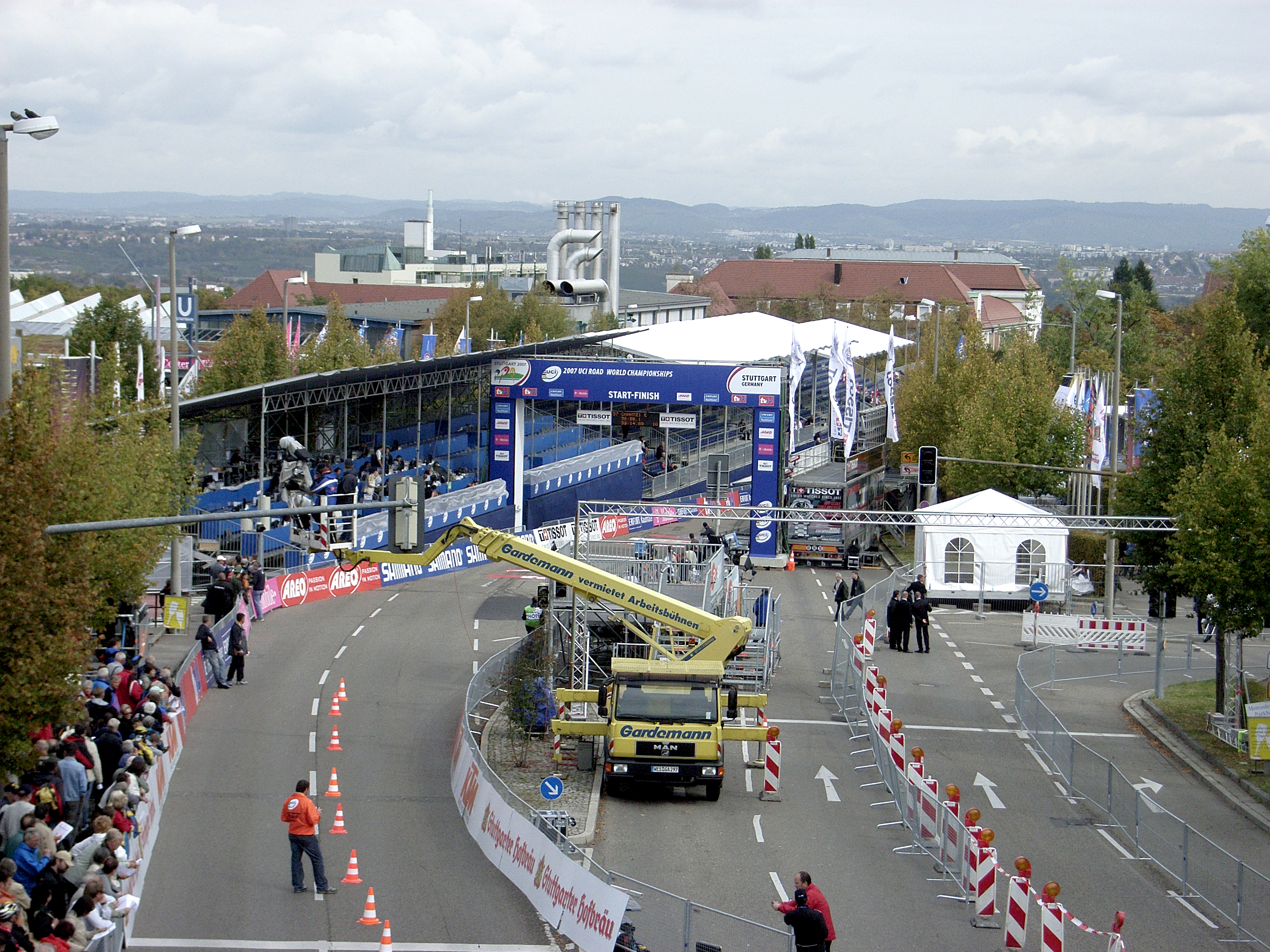
Start and finish line at women's time trial
