= 2009 UCI Road World Championships – Women's road race =

Women's road race
2009 UCI Road World Championships
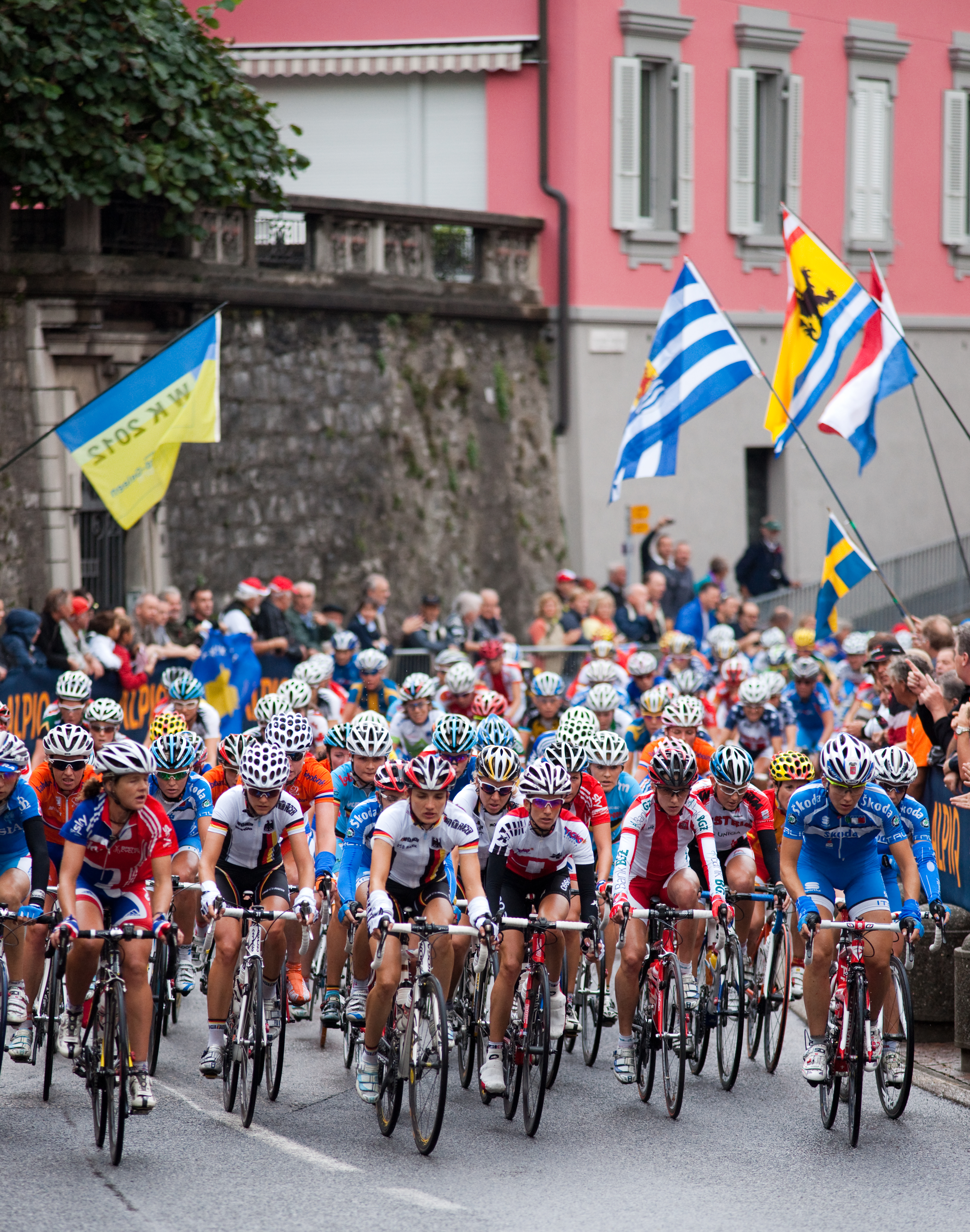
- The peloton just after the start in Mendrisio

Race details
- Dates: 26 September 2009
- Stages: 1 in (Switzerland) Mendrisio (SWI)
- Distance: 124.2 km (77.2 mi)
- Winning time: 3h 33' 25"

Medalists
	Gold	(Italy) Tatiana Guderzo (ITA)
	Silver	(Netherlands) Marianne Vos (NED)
	Bronze	(Italy) Noemi Cantele (ITA)

The women's road race of the 2009 UCI Road World Championships cycling event took place on 26 September in Mendrisio, Switzerland. The race was won by Italy's Tatiana Guderzo, followed by Marianne Vos (Netherlands) and Noemi Cantele (Italy).

== Participating nations ==
No.	Code	Nation
1-7	GBR	Great Britain
8-14	NED	Netherlands
15-20	GER	Germany
21-24	SWE	Sweden
25-30	AUS	Australia
31-36	USA	United States
37-42	ITA	Italy
43-48	LTU	Lithuania
49-54	RUS	Russia
55-59	BEL	Belgium
60-61	DEN	Denmark
62-67	FRA	France
68-73	CAN	Canada
74-79	SUI	Switzerland
80-81	AUT	Austria
82-84	NZL	New Zealand
85-86	RSA	South Africa

No.	Code	Nation
87-91	UKR	Ukraine
92-97	ESP	Spain
98-100	MEX	Mexico
101	CZE	Czech Republic
102-104	SLO	Slovenia
105-106	BRA	Brazil
107-110	POL	Poland
111-114	THA	Thailand
115	NOR	Norway
116-118	CRO	Croatia
119-120	SKT	Saint Kitts and Nevis
121-122	IRL	Ireland
123	INA	Indonesia
124	ARG	Argentina
125	TUR	Turkey
126	AND	Andorra
127	POR	Portugal

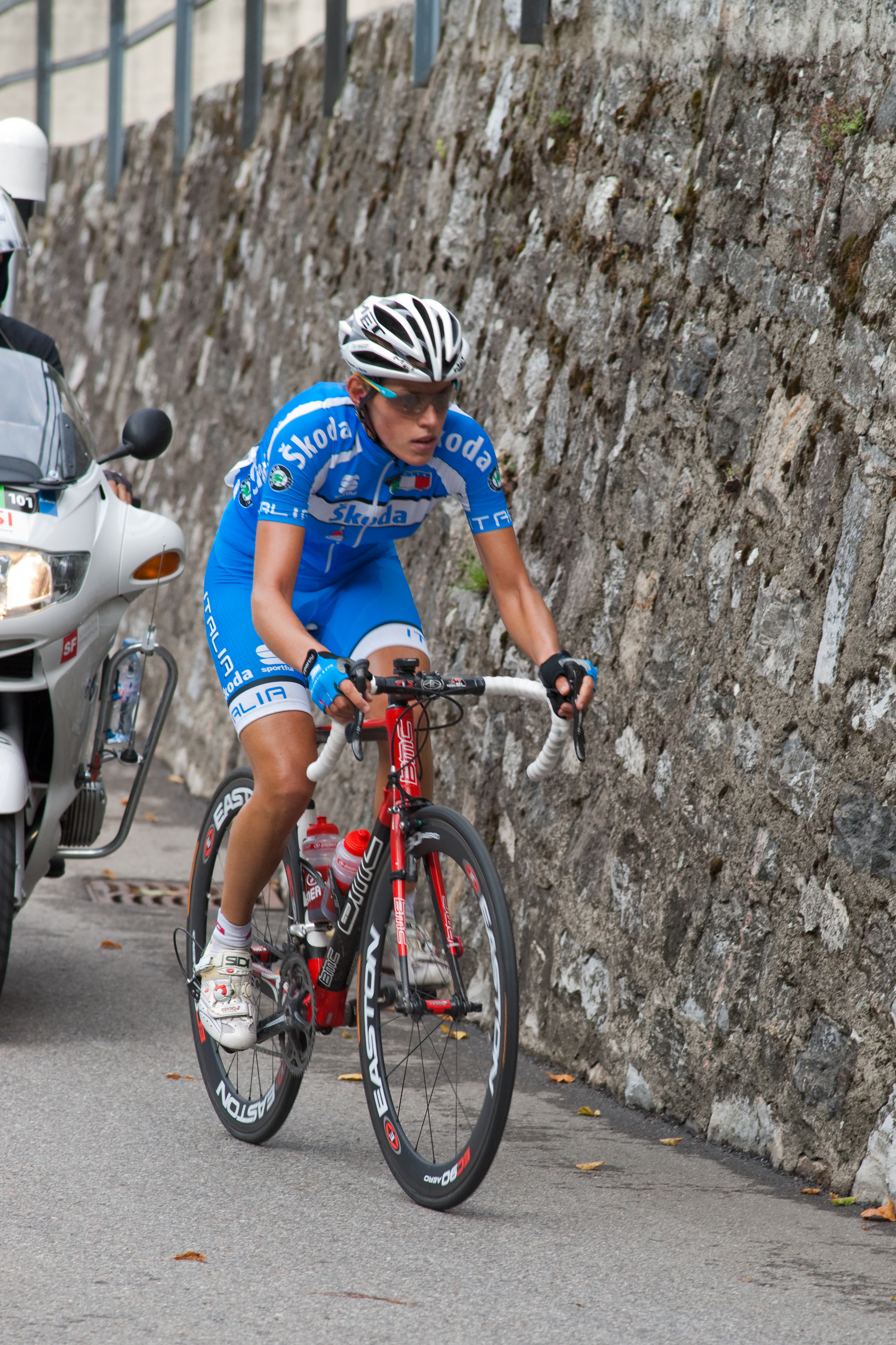
Noemi Cantele won bronze

== Final classification ==
Rank	Rider	Country	Time
1	Tatiana Guderzo	Italy	3h 33' 25"
2	Marianne Vos	Netherlands	+ 19"
3	Noemi Cantele	Italy	+ 19"
4	Kristin Armstrong	United States	+ 19"
5	Diana Žiliūtė	Lithuania	+ 1' 07"
6	Judith Arndt	Germany	+ 1' 07"
7	Erinne Willock	Canada	+ 1' 07"
8	Nicole Brändli	Switzerland	+ 1' 07"
9	Grace Verbeke	Belgium	+ 1' 07"
10	Catherine Cheatley	New Zealand	+ 1' 07"
11	Emma Johansson	Sweden	+ 1' 07"
12	Ruth Corset	Australia	+ 1' 07"
13	Edita Pučinskaitė	Lithuania	+ 1' 07"
14	Emma Pooley	United Kingdom	+ 1' 07"
15	Evelyn Stevens	United States	+ 1' 07"
16	Linda Villumsen	Denmark	+ 3' 02"
17	Paulina Brzeźna	Poland	+ 3' 41"
18	Mara Abbott	United States	+ 4' 51"
19	Claudia Häusler	Germany	+ 5' 51"
20	Ana Garcia Antequera	Spain	+ 5' 54"
21	Andrea Bosman	Netherlands	+ 6' 54"
22	Ludivine Henrion	Belgium	+ 6' 54"
23	Chantal Blaak	Netherlands	+ 6' 54"
24	Yuliya Martisova	Russia	+ 6' 54"
25	Christel Ferrier-Bruneau	France	+ 6' 54"
26	Edwige Pitel	France	+ 6' 54"
27	Elizabeth Armitstead	United Kingdom	+ 6' 54"
28	Sharon Laws	United Kingdom	+ 6' 54"
29	Trixi Worrack	Germany	+ 6' 54"
30	Fabiana Luperini	Italy	+ 6' 54"
31	Karine Gautard	France	+ 9' 52"
32	Rasa Leleivytė	Lithuania	+ 10' 11"
33	Kaytee Boyd	New Zealand	+ 10' 11"
34	Carla Swart	South Africa	+ 10' 11"
35	Sophie Creux	France	+ 10' 11"
36	Monika Grzebinoga	Poland	+ 10' 11"
37	Marissa van der Merwe	South Africa	+ 10' 11"
38	Verónica Leal Balderas	Mexico	+ 10' 11"
39	Christiane Soeder	Austria	+ 10' 11"
40	Tara Whitten	Canada	+ 10' 11"
41	Olena Oliinyk	Ukraine	+ 10' 11"
42	Regina Bruins	Netherlands	+ 10' 13"
43	Irene van den Broek	Netherlands	+ 10' 13"
44	Julie Krasniak	France	+ 10' 13"
45	Loes Gunnewijk	Netherlands	+ 10' 13"
46	Monia Baccaille	Italy	+ 10' 18"
47	Luisa Tamanini	Italy	+ 10' 18"
48	Jeannie Longo-Ciprelli	France	+ 12' 09"
49	Oxana Kozonchuk	Russia	+ 12' 46"
50	Eivgenia Vysotska	Ukraine	+ 12' 46"
51	Laura Lorenza Morfin Macouzet	Mexico	+ 12' 46"
52	Tiffany Cromwell	Australia	+ 12' 46"
53	Alyona Andruk	Ukraine	+ 12' 46"
54	Patricia Schwager	Switzerland	+ 12' 46"
55	Lieselot Decroix	Belgium	+ 12' 46"
56	Daniela Pintarelli	Austria	+ 13' 02"
DNF	Modesta Vžesniauskaitė	Lithuania	
DNF	Siobhan Horgan	Ireland	
DNF	Rachel Mercer	New Zealand	
DNF	Giuseppina Grassi Herrera	Mexico	
DNF	Anna Evseeva	Russia	
DNF	Małgorzata Jasińska	Poland	
DNF	Nina Ovcharenko	Ukraine	
DNF	Liesbet De Vocht	Belgium	
DNF	Kim Anderson	United States	
DNF	Giorgia Bronzini	Italy	
DNF	Tina Liebig	Germany	
DNF	Tatiana Antoshina	Russia	
DNF	Jessie Daams	Belgium	
DNF	Eneritz Iturriagaechevarria Mazaga	Spain	
DNF	Edita Ungurytė	Lithuania	
DNF	Inga Čilvinaitė	Lithuania	
DNF	Anna Sanchis Chafer	Spain	
DNF	Martine Bras	Netherlands	
DNF	Joëlle Numainville	Canada	
DNF	Svetlana Bubnenkova	Russia	
DNF	Ariadna Tudel Cuberes	Andorra	
DNF	Nicole Cooke	United Kingdom	
DNF	Katie Colclough	United Kingdom	
DNF	Sigrid Corneo	Slovenia	
DNF	Vicki Whitelaw	Australia	
DNF	Charlotte Becker	Germany	
DNF	Jennifer Hohl	Switzerland	
DNF	Trine Schmidt	Denmark	
DNF	Emilie Aubry	Switzerland	
DNF	Sylwia Kapusta	Poland	
DNF	Polona Batagelj	Slovenia	
DNF	Rosane Kirch	Brazil	
DNF	Marie Lindberg	Sweden	
DNF	Emilia Fahlin	Sweden	
DNF	Jessica Schneeberger	Switzerland	
DNF	Chanpeng Nontasin	Thailand	
DNF	Ester Alves	Portugal	
DNF	Fröydis Waerstad	Norway	
DNF	Ina Teutenberg	Germany	
DNF	Lucy Martin	United Kingdom	
DNF	Belén López Morales	Spain	
DNF	Elena Novikova	Russia	
DNF	Olivia Dillon	Ireland	
DNF	Andrea Wölfer	Switzerland	
DNF	Martina Růžičková	Czech Republic	
DNF	Maja Marukic	Croatia	
DNF	Semra Yetiş	Turkey	
DNF	Kathryn Bertine	Saint Kitts and Nevis	
DNF	Marina Boduljak	Croatia	
DNF	Monrudee Chapookam	Thailand	
DNF	Wilaiwan Kunlapha	Thailand	
DNF	Thatsani Wichana	Thailand	
DNF	Amber Neben	United States	
DNF	Dahlina Rosyida	India	
DNF	Meredith Miller	United States	
DNF	Rochelle Gilmore	Australia	
DNF	Emma Mackie	Australia	
DNF	Heather Logan	Canada	
DNF	Monica Ceccon	Saint Kitts and Nevis	
DNF	Blaža Klemenčič	Slovenia	
DNF	Sara Mustonen	Sweden	
DNF	Oksana Kashchyshyna	Ukraine	
DNF	Alison Testroete	Canada	
DNF	Veronica Marcela Gerez	Argentina	
DNF	Julie Beveridge	Canada	
DNF	Marta Vila Josana Andreu	Spain	
DNF	Ane Santesteban Gonzalez	Spain	
DNF	Uênia Fernandes de Souza	Brazil	
DNF	Viena Balen	Croatia	
DNF	Alex Rhodes	Australia	
DNF	Nikki Harris	United Kingdom	
