= 2010 UCI Road World Championships – Women's road race =

Women's road race
2010 UCI Road World Championships
- Rainbow jersey

Race details
- Dates: 2 October 2010
- Stages: 1 in (Australia) Melbourne (AUS)
- Distance: 127.2 km (79.0 mi)
- Winning time: 3h 32' 01"

Medalists
	Gold	(Italy) Giorgia Bronzini (ITA)
	Silver	(Netherlands) Marianne Vos (NED)
	Bronze	(Sweden) Emma Johansson (SWE)

The Women's road race of the 2010 UCI Road World Championships cycling event took place on 2 October in Melbourne, Australia.

For the third time in four years, an Italian rider claimed the gold medal, with Giorgia Bronzini edging out her rivals in a sprint finish. Dutch rider Marianne Vos finished second for her fourth consecutive silver medal in the event, with Emma Johansson of Sweden taking the bronze.

== Route ==
The race covered 127.2 kilometres (79.0 mi).

== Final classification ==
Rank	Rider	Country	Time
1	Giorgia Bronzini	Italy	3h 32' 01"
2	Marianne Vos	Netherlands	+ 0"
3	Emma Johansson	Sweden	+ 0"
4	Nicole Cooke	United Kingdom	+ 0"
5	Judith Arndt	Germany	+ 1"
6	Grace Verbeke	Belgium	+ 3"
7	Trixi Worrack	Germany	+ 3"
8	Rasa Leleivytė	Lithuania	+ 3"
9	Lizzie Armitstead	United Kingdom	+ 3"
10	Carla Swart	South Africa	+ 3"
11	Catherine Cheatley	New Zealand	+ 3"
12	Jeannie Longo	France	+ 3"
13	Olga Zabelinskaya	Russia	+ 3"
14	Andrea Graus	Austria	+ 3"
15	Tara Whitten	Canada	+ 3"
16	Sharon Laws	United Kingdom	+ 3"
17	Amber Neben	United States	+ 3"
18	Edwige Pitel	France	+ 3"
19	Linda Villumsen	New Zealand	+ 3"
20	Emma Pooley	United Kingdom	+ 3"
21	Evelyn Stevens	United States	+ 8"
22	Noemi Cantele	Italy	+ 8"
23	Erinne Willock	Canada	+ 21"
24	Tatiana Guderzo	Italy	+ 32"
25	Annemiek van Vleuten	Netherlands	+ 1' 42"
26	Ruth Corset	Australia	+ 1' 42"
27	Regina Bruins	Netherlands	+ 1' 42"
28	Vicki Whitelaw	Australia	+ 1' 42"
29	Catherine Williamson	United Kingdom	+ 1' 42"
30	Tatiana Antoshina	Russia	+ 1' 42"
31	Loes Gunnewijk	Netherlands	+ 1' 42"
32	Noortje Tabak	Netherlands	+ 1' 42"
33	Edita Pučinskaitė	Lithuania	+ 1' 42"
34	Natalia Boyarskaya	Russia	+ 1' 47"
35	Elena Berlato	Italy	+ 2' 02"
36	Luisa Tamanini	Italy	+ 2' 02"
37	Grete Treier	Estonia	+ 7' 38"
38	Mayuko Hagiwara	Japan	+ 7' 40"
39	Oxana Kozonchuk	Russia	+ 7' 40"
40	Yulia Martisova	Russia	+ 7' 40"
41	Robyn de Groot	South Africa	+ 7' 40"
42	Marissa van der Merwe	South Africa	+ 7' 45"
43	Anne Samplonius	Canada	+ 7' 48"
44	Polona Batagelj	Slovenia	+ 9' 39"
45	Sara Mustonen	Sweden	+ 9' 39"
46	Christel Ferrier-Bruneau	France	+ 9' 39"
47	Fröydis Waerstad	Norway	+ 9' 39"
48	Sophie Creux	France	+ 9' 39"
49	Liesbet De Vocht	Belgium	+ 9' 39"
50	Verónica Leal Balderas	Mexico	+ 9' 39"
51	Lieselot Decroix	Belgium	+ 9' 39"
52	Marie Lindberg	Sweden	+ 11' 36"
53	Lise Nøstvold	Norway	+ 11' 36"
54	Emilia Fahlin	Sweden	+ 11' 36"
55	Sofie De Vuyst	Belgium	+ 11' 36"
56	Anriette Schoeman	South Africa	+ 11' 36"
57	Martina Růžičková	Czech Republic	+ 11' 36"
58	Christine Majerus	Luxembourg	+ 11' 52"
59	Emilie Aubry	Switzerland	+ 11' 52"
60	Natalya Stefanskaya	Kazakhstan	+ 11' 52"
61	Luise Keller	Germany	+ 11' 54"
62	Serena Sheridan	New Zealand	+ 11' 54"
63	Jennifer Hohl	Switzerland	+ 11' 54"
64	Márcia Fernandes Silva	Brazil	+ 11' 54"
65	Carmen Small	United States	+ 11' 54"
66	Alyona Andruk	Ukraine	+ 11' 54"
67	Valentina Carretta	Italy	+ 11' 54"
68	Theresa Cliff-Ryan	United States	+ 11' 54"
69	Joëlle Numainville	Canada	+ 11' 54"
70	Toni Bradshaw	New Zealand	+ 11' 54"
71	Nathalie Lamborelle	Luxembourg	+ 16' 39"
72	Edita Janeliūnaitė	Lithuania	+ 16' 39"
73	Inga Čilvinaitė	Lithuania	+ 16' 39"
74	Tatiana Panina	Belarus	+ 18' 06"
75	Ariadna Tudel Cuberes	Andorra	+ 18' 33"
76	Belén López Morales	Spain	+ 19' 35"

Rank	Rider	Country	Time
	Emilie Moberg	Norway	DNF
	Katheryn Curi	United States	DNF
	Chantal Blaak	Netherlands	DNF
	Adrie Visser	Netherlands	DNF
	Ina-Yoko Teutenberg	Germany	DNF
	Kirsten Wild	Netherlands	DNF
	Charlotte Becker	Germany	DNF
	Rossella Callovi	Italy	DNF
	Chanpeng Nontasin	Thailand	DNF
	Carla Ryan	Australia	DNF
	Amanda Miller	United States	DNF
	Shelley Olds	United States	DNF
	Tiffany Cromwell	Australia	DNF
	Elena Kuchinskaya	Russia	DNF
	Eleonora Patuzzo	Italy	DNF
	Lucy Martin	United Kingdom	DNF
	Katie Colclough	United Kingdom	DNF
	Modesta Vžesniauskaitė	Lithuania	DNF
	Shara Gillow	Australia	DNF
	Svitlana Halyuk	Ukraine	DNF
	Emma Crum	New Zealand	DNF
	Maja Marukic	Croatia	DNF
	Monrudee Chapookam	Thailand	DNF
	Ludivine Henrion	Belgium	DNF
	Karol-Ann Canuel	Canada	DNF
	Amanda Spratt	Australia	DNF
	Bridie O'Donnell	Australia	DNF
	Ana Belen Garcia Antequera	Spain	DNF
	Lesya Kalytovska	Ukraine	DNF
	Kataržina Sosna	Lithuania	DNF
	Mariana Mohammad	Malaysia	DNF
	Kimberley Yap	Malaysia	DNF
	Cherise Taylor	South Africa	DNF
	Rosa Maria Bravo Soba	Spain	DNF
	Serene Lee	Singapore	DNF
	Noor Azian Alias	Malaysia	DNF
	Kathryn Bertine	Saint Kitts and Nevis	DNF
	Courteney Lowe	New Zealand	DNF
	Doris Schweizer	Switzerland	DNF
	Patricia Schwager	Switzerland	DNF
	Ana Teresa Casas	Mexico	DNF
	Valeria Teresita Müller	Argentina	DNF
	Dinah Chan	Singapore	DNF
	Sofía Arreola	Mexico	DNF
	Denise Ramsden	Canada	DNF
	Colleen Ang	Singapore	DNF
	Nina Ovcharenko	Ukraine	DNS
