= Luisa Tamanini =

Italian cyclist

Personal information
- Born: 31 January 1980 (age 46) Italy

Cycling career
- Sport: Cycling
- Discipline: Road cycling
- Rider type: Climber

Amateur teams
- Sc Vallagarina Lloyd Italico
- CSI Ju Sport

Professional teams
- 1999: S.C. Master Automazione Molteni Record
- 2000: Team Alfa Lum R.S.M.
- 2001-2002: Edil Savino
- 2003: Team 2002 Aurora RSM
- 2004: PMB - Fenixs
- 2005: Team Bianchi - Aliverti
- 2006-2008: Safi - Pasta Zara Manhattan
- 2009: Selle Italia Ghezzi
- 2010: Chirio Forno d'Asolo
- 2011: Gauss
- 2012: Faren-Honda Team
- 2013: Chirio Forno d'Asolo
Medal record
Gold medal – first place	2009 Mediterranean Games

Luisa Tamanini (born 31 January 1980) is a retired road cyclist from Italy. She represented her nation at the 2005, 2007, 2009 and 2010 UCI Road World Championships.

== Career ==
Tamanini began racing in 1990, becoming interested in the sport thanks to her brother. She moved to the Province of Varese to join the CSI Ju Sport.

She was active in the youth categories between 1999 and 2003, winning the U23 national time trial championship and the general classification of the 2003 Giro del Trentino. She achieved a stage victory at the 2005 Tour Féminin en Limousin and in 2007 finished second in the 2007 Italian National Championships.

She won gold in the women's road race at the 2009 Mediterranean Games in Pescara.

She retired from cycling during the 2013 season.

== Personal life ==
In 2014 she had a son, Francesco Giovanni.

== Major Results ==
Grand Tour	1999	2000	2001	2002	2003	2004	2005	2006	2007	2008	2009	2010	2011	2012
Giro d'Italia Women	—	—	—	—	16	107	41	—	17	—	DNF	67	—	—
Grande Boucle Féminine Internationale	—	54	—	—	11	Race not held	—	—	—	—	—	Race did not exist		
Stage race results timeline
Stage race	1999	2000	2001	2002	2003	2004	2005	2006	2007	2008	2009	2010	2011	2012
Emakumeen Euskal Bira	—	—	—	—	—	—	—	—	—	—	—	62	DNF	62
Energiewacht Tour	Race did not exist												—	DNF
Gracia–Orlová	—	—	—	—	—	42	—	—	—	—	26	—	—	—
Giro del Trentino Alto Adige-Südtirol	66	—	—	—	1	—	—	—	—	—	DNF	—	—	36
Giro della Toscana Int. Femminile	—	DNF	—	DNF	33	73	DNF	—	39	DNF	2	45	—	24
Giro di San Marino	Race did not exist						—	28	—	Race did not exist				
Holland Ladies Tour	—	—	—	—	—	—	68	DNF	35	—	—	—	—	—
Ladies Tour of Qatar	Race did not exist										—	—	77	—
Thüringen Rundfahrt der Frauen	—	—	—	—	—	—	—	24	—	—	24	—	DNF	—
Tour de l'Aude Cycliste Féminin	—	—	—	—	DNF	—	—	—	—	—	—	—	Race did not exist	
Tour Féminin en Limousin	Race did not exist						8	—	—	—	—	—	—	—
Tour de PEI	Race did not exist								40	—	8	Race did not exist		
Tour du Grand Montréal	Race did not exist			—	—	—	—	—	59	—	24	Race did not exist		
Tour of Chongming Island	Race did not exist									—	—	—	—	83
Trophée d'Or Féminin	—	—	—	—	—	—	—	—	8	DNF	—	16	—	23
Vuelta a Castilla y León feminas	Race did not exist		—	9	—	—	12	Race did not exist						
Vuelta a El Salvador	Race did not exist					—	—	—	—	—	Race did not exist			46
Women's Tour of New Zealand	Race did not exist						—	—	—	—	—	—	—	DNF

Event		2005	2006	2007	2008	2009	2010
World Championships
World Championships	Road race	85	—	52	—	47	36
