= 2009 Tour of Flanders for Women =

2009 UCI Women's Road World Cup
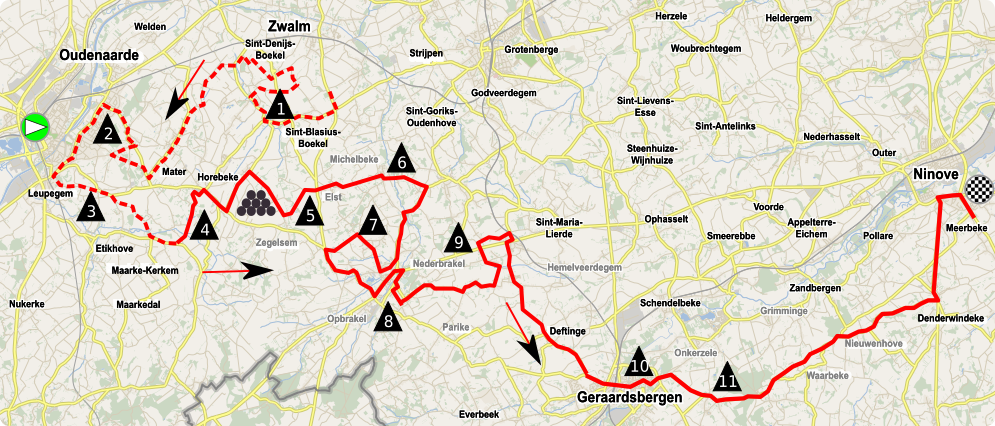

Race details
- Dates: 5 April 2009
- Stages: 1
- Distance: 131.6 km (81.8 mi)
- Winning time: 3h 30' 12"

Results
	Winner	Ina-Yoko Teutenberg (GER)
	Second	Kirsten Wild (NED)
	Third	Emma Johansson (SWE)

The sixth edition of the Tour of Flanders for Women cycling race was held on 5 April 2009. The race started in Oudenaarde and finished in Meerbeke, containing 11 climbs and two flat cobbled sections, covering a total distance of 130 km. It was the second leg of the 2009 UCI Women's Road World Cup. The race was won by German rider Ina-Yoko Teutenberg.

== Race Summary ==
The race was enlivened by a break from Alona Andruk who gained up to three minutes but was caught before reaching the Muur van Geraardsbergen. On the Muur, Marianne Vos, Emma Johansson, Noemi Cantele and Nicole Cooke broke clear. On the Bosberg, the quartet was joined by six other riders, when Marianne Vos attacked again. Cervélo TestTeam led the chase and caught Vos at 4 km from the finish line. Ina-Yoko Teutenberg won the sprint ahead of Kirsten Wild and Emma Johansson.

== Results ==
Final general classification

Rank	Rider	Team	Time
1	Ina-Yoko Teutenberg (GER)	Team Columbia–High Road Women	3h 30' 12"
2	Kirsten Wild (NED)	Cervélo TestTeam	s.t.
3	Emma Johansson (SWE)	Red Sun Cycling Team	s.t.
4	Nicole Cooke (GBR)	Vision1 Racing	s.t.
5	Martine Bras (NED)	Selle Italia–Ghezzi	s.t.
6	Marianne Vos (NED)	DSB Bank - Nederland bloeit	s.t.
7	Yuliya Martisova (RUS)	Gauss RDZ Ormu–Colnago	s.t.
8	Noemi Cantele (ITA)	Bigla Cycling Team	s.t.
9	Loes Gunnewijk (NED)	Team Flexpoint	s.t.
10	Grace Verbeke (BEL)	Lotto–Belisol Ladiesteam	s.t.
