= Gerez =

Gerez is a surname. Notable people with the surname include:

- Marisa Gerez (born 1976), Argentine footballer
- Santiago Silva Gerez (born 1990), Uruguayan footballer
- Veronica Marcela Gerez (fl. 2000s), Argentine road cyclist

== See also ==
- Pérez
