= 2007 Holland Ladies Tour =

Race details
- Dates: September 3 – September 8
- Stages: 7
- Distance: 621.3 km (386.1 mi)
- Winning time: 15h 28' 34"

Results
Jersey awarded to the overall winner	Winner	Kristin Armstrong (USA)	(US National Team)
	Second	Judith Arndt (GER)	(T-Mobile)
	Third	Linda Villumsen (DEN)	(T-Mobile)
Jersey awarded to the points classification winner	Points	Marianne Vos (NED)	(Team DSB Bank)
Jersey awarded to the mountains classification winner	Mountains	Kristin Armstrong (USA)	(US National Team)
Jersey awarded to the youth classification winner	Youth	Marianne Vos (NED)	(Team DSB Bank)
Jersey awarded to the sprints classification winner	Sprints	Andrea Bosman (NED)	(Team DSB Bank)
	Team	Equipe Nürnberger Versicherung	

The 10th edition of the annual Holland Ladies Tour was held from September 3 to September 8, 2007. The women's stage race with an UCI rating of 2.1 started in Valkenburg, and ended in Denekamp.

== Stages ==
=== 2007-09-03: Valkenburg — Berg en Terblijt (97.6 km) ===
Place	Stage 1		General Classification	
Place	Name	Time	Name	Time
1.	Marianne Vos (NED)	02:36.50	Marianne Vos (NED)	02:36.40
2.	Judith Arndt (GER)	+0.02	Judith Arndt (GER)	+0.06
3.	Marta Bastianelli (ITA)	+0.05	Marta Bastianelli (ITA)	+0.11

=== 2007-09-04: Leende — Leende (105.3 km) ===
Place	Stage 2		General Classification	
Place	Name	Time	Name	Time
1.	Judith Arndt (GER)	02:37.38	Judith Arndt (GER)	05:14.13
2.	Trixi Worrack (GER)	—	Trixi Worrack (GER)	+0.14
3.	Irene van den Broek (NED)	—	Marianne Vos (NED)	—

=== 2007-09-05: Apeldoorn — Apeldoorn (97.8 km) ===
Place	Stage 3		General Classification	
Place	Name	Time	Name	Time
1.	Kirsten Wild (NED)	02:25.33	Judith Arndt (GER)	07:39.46
2.	Ina-Yoko Teutenberg (GER)	—	Marianne Vos (NED)	+0.14
3.	Regina Schleicher (GER)	—	Trixi Worrack (GER)	—

=== 2007-09-06: Roden — Roden (112.2 km) ===
Place	Stage 4		General Classification	
Place	Name	Time	Name	Time
1.	Marianne Vos (NED)	02:44.06	Marianne Vos (NED)	10:23.56
2.	Kirsten Wild (NED)	—	Judith Arndt (GER)	+0.18
3.	Giorgia Bronzini (ITA)	—	Marta Bastianelli (ITA)	+0.22

=== 2007-09-07: Nijverdal — Nijverdal (103.4 km) ===
Place	Stage 5		General Classification	
Place	Name	Time	Name	Time
1.	Martine Bras (NED)	02:28.59	Marianne Vos (NED)	12:53.08
2.	Charlotte Becker (GER)	—	Judith Arndt (GER)	+0.04
3.	Emma Johansson (SWE)	—	Emma Johansson (SWE)	+0.09

=== 2007-09-08: Denekamp — Denekamp (85.1 km) ===
Place	Stage 6		General Classification	
Place	Name	Time	Name	Time
1.	Regina Schleicher (GER)	02:08.15	Marianne Vos (NED)	15:01.23
2.	Ina-Yoko Teutenberg (GER)	—	Judith Arndt (GER)	+0.04
3.	Brooke Miller (USA)	—	Emma Johansson (SWE)	+0.08

=== 2007-09-08: Nordhorn — Denekamp (19.9 km) ===
Place	Stage 7 (Individual Time Trial)		General Classification	
Place	Name	Time	Name	Time
1.	Kristin Armstrong (USA)	00:26.28	Kristin Armstrong (USA)	15:28.34
2.	Christiane Soeder (AUT)	+0.18	Judith Arndt (GER)	+0.05
3.	Linda Villumsen (DEN)	+0.32	Linda Villumsen (DEN)	+0.28
4.	Trixi Worrack (GER)	+0.41		
5.	Judith Arndt (GER)	+0.44		
6.	Priska Doppmann (SUI)	+0.57		
7.	Regina Bruins (NED)	+1.11		
8.	Ellen van Dijk (NED)	+1.13		
9.	Loes Gunnewijk (NED)	+1.17		
10.	Trine Schmidt (DEN)	+1.17		

== Final standings ==
=== General Classification ===
RANK	NAME	TEAM	TIME
1.	Kristin Armstrong (USA)	US National Team	15:28.34
2.	Judith Arndt (GER)	T-Mobile Women	+ 0.05
3.	Linda Villumsen (DEN)	T-Mobile Women	+ 0.28
4.	Trixi Worrack (GER)	Equipe Nürnberger Versicherung	+ 0.34
5.	Christiane Soeder (AUT)	Raleigh Lifeforce Creation HP Pro Cycling Team	+ 0.47
6.	Charlotte Becker (GER)	Equipe Nürnberger Versicherung	+ 0.53
7.	Marianne Vos (NED)	Team DSB Bank	+ 0.55
8.	Regina Bruins (NED)	Ton van Bemmelen Sports/Odysis	+ 1.03
9.	Emma Johansson (SWE)	Vlaanderen - Caprisonne	+ 1.11
10.	Priska Doppmann (SUI)	Raleigh Lifeforce Creation HP Pro Cycling Team	+ 1.24

=== Points Classification ===
RANK	NAME	TEAM	POINTS
1.	Marianne Vos (NED)	Team DSB Bank	76
2.	Kirsten Wild (NED)	AA-Drink Cycling Team	73
3.	Judith Arndt (GER)	T-Mobile Women	71

=== Mountains Classification ===
RANK	NAME	TEAM	POINTS
1.	Kristin Armstrong (USA)	US National Team	36
2.	Marianne Vos (NED)	Team DSB Bank	17
3.	Linda Villumsen (DEN)	T-Mobile Women	14

=== Best Young Rider Classification ===
RANK	NAME	TEAM	TIME
1.	Marianne Vos (NED)	Team DSB Bank	15:29.29
2.	Regina Bruins (NED)	Regioteam Ton van Bemmelen / Odysis	+ 00.08
3.	Stephanie Pohl (GER)	Team Getränke Hoffmann	+ 01.14

=== Sprint Classification ===
RANK	NAME	TEAM	POINTS
1.	Andrea Bosman (NED)	Team DSB Bank	15
2.	Suzanne de Goede (NED)	T-Mobile Women	11
3.	Trixi Worrack (GER)	Equipe Nürnberger Versicherung	5

=== Most Aggressive Rider Classification ===
RANK	NAME	TEAM	POINTS
1.	Ludivine Henrion (BEL)	Team Flexpoint	8
2.	Mascha Pijnenborg (NED)	Het Snelle Wiel/MIX	6
3.	Adrie Visser (NED)	Team DSB Bank	5
