= Ariadna Tudel Cuberes =

Andorran ski mountaineer (born 1978)

Personal information
- Born: 17 November 1978 (age 47) Escaldes-Engordany (?)

Cycling career
- Sport: Cycling
- Discipline: Road
- Role: Rider

Professional team
- 2010–2011: Bizkaia–Durango
Medal record
Representing Andorra
Ski mountaineering
| Bronze medal – third place | 2009 European Championship | Team |

Ariadna Tudel Cuberes (born 17 November 1978) from Escaldes-Engordany is an Andorran road cyclist and ski mountaineer.

Tudel started ski mountaineering in 2004 and competed first in the Nocturna Pas de la Casa race in 2005.

As a cyclist she represented Andorra at the 2009 UCI Road World Championships in the women's road race and also at the 2010 UCI Road World Championships in the women's road race. She rode for the professional cycling team Bizkaia–Durango in 2010 and 2011.

== Selected results ==
- 2006:
  - 4th, Nocturna Pas de la Casa
- 2007:
  - 7th, European Championship relay race (together with Neus Tort Gendrau and Sophie Dusautoir Bertrand)
  - 10th, European Championship team race (together with Neus Tort Gendrau)
- 2008:
  - 7th, World Championship vertical race
  - 8th, World Championship single race
- 2009:
  - 3rd, European Championship team race (together with Sophie Dusautoir Bertrand)
- 2010:
  - 6th, World Championship team race (together with Sophie Dusautoir Bertrand)
  - 8th, World Championship relay race (together with Sophie Dusautoir Bertrand and Maria Segura Lanao)
