= 2010 Omloop Het Nieuwsblad (women's race) =

Race details
- Dates: 27 February 2010
- Stages: 1
- Distance: 125.7 km (78.1 mi)
- Winning time: 3h 26' 15"

Results
	Winner	Emma Johansson (SWE)	(Red Sun Cycling Team)
	Second	Liesbet De Vocht (BEL)	(Nederland bloeit)
	Third	Grace Verbeke (BEL)	(Lotto Ladies Team)

The 2010 Omloop Het Nieuwsblad was the 5th edition of the women's Omloop Het Nieuwsblad road cycling one-day race, which was held on 27 February.

The race was won by Swedish rider Emma Johansson ahead of Liesbet De Vocht and Grace Verbeke.

== Results ==
Final general classification
Rank	Rider	Team	Time
1	Emma Johansson (SWE)	Red Sun Cycling Team	3h 26' 15"
2	Liesbet De Vocht (BEL)	Nederland bloeit	+ 0"
3	Grace Verbeke (BEL)	Lotto Ladies Team	+ 0"
4	Regina Bruins (NED)	Cervélo TestTeam	+ 6"
5	Sarah Düster (GER)	Cervélo TestTeam	+ 1' 48"
6	Martine Bras (NED)	Gauss RDZ Ormu	+ 2' 45"
7	Mirjam Melchers-Van Poppel (NED)	Cervélo TestTeam	+ 2' 45"
8	Loes Gunnewijk (NED)	Nederland bloeit	+ 2' 52"
9	Sophie Creux (FRA)	ESGL 93 - GSD Gestion	+ 2' 54"
10	Iris Slappendel (NED)	Cervélo TestTeam	+ 2' 54"
