= Ankaragücü Cycling Team =

Team information
- Registered: Ankara, Turkey
- Founded: 2008
- Disbanded: 2012
- Discipline: Mountainbike
- Status: Defunct
- Bicycles: Salcano

Ankaragücü Cycling Team was a Turkish professional cycling team, based in Ankara. The team was the men's and women's cycling department of MKE Ankaragücü, a major sports club in Ankara, Turkey. In 2010, Ankaragücü was the only team who had UCI licence by mountainbike discipline. Semra Yetiş was part of the team in 2010.
