= Emma Johansson =

Swedish cyclist (born 1983)

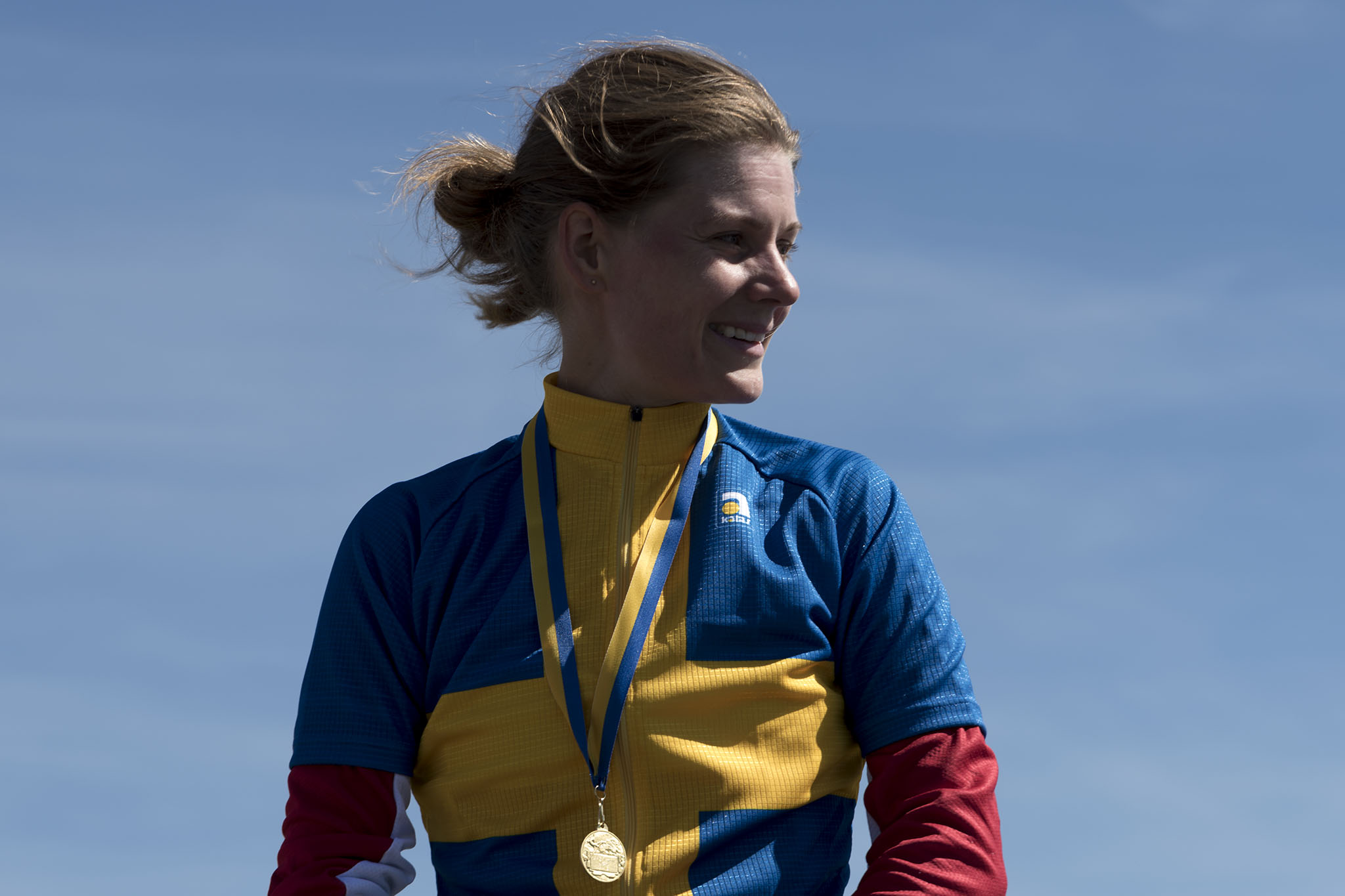
- Johansson at the 2016 Swedish National Road Race Championships

Personal information
- Full name: Emma Karolina Johansson
- Nickname: Silver Emma
- Born: 23 September 1983 (age 43) Sollefteå, Sweden
- Height: 1.67 m (5 ft 6 in)
- Weight: 58 kg (128 lb)

Cycling career
- Sport: Cycling
- Current team: Retired
- Discipline: Road
- Role: Rider
- Rider type: All-rounder

Professional teams
- 2005–2006: Bizkaia–Panda Software–Durango
- 2007: Vlaanderen–Capri Sonne–T Interim
- 2008: AA-Drink Cycling Team
- 2009–2010: Red Sun Cycling Team
- 2011–2012: Hitec Products UCK
- 2013–2015: Orica–AIS
- 2016: Wiggle High5

Major wins
- Major Tours Giro d'Italia 1 individual stage (2012) Stage races Thüringen Rundfahrt der Frauen (2011, 2013, 2015) Emakumeen Euskal Bira (2013, 2016) Belgium Tour (2015) One-day races and Classics National Road Race Championships (2010–2012, 2014–2016) National Time Trial Championships (2005, 2007–2008, 2012–2016) Trofeo Alfredo Binda (2014) Omloop Het Nieuwsblad (2010, 2011) Omloop van het Hageland (2010, 2011) Le Samyn (2014) Ronde van Drenthe (2009) Other UCI World Ranking (2013)
Medal record
Women's road cycling
Representing Sweden
Olympic Games
Silver medal – second place	2008 Beijing	Road race
Silver medal – second place	2016 Rio de Janeiro	Road race
World Championship
Silver medal – second place	2013 Toscana	Road race
Bronze medal – third place	2010 Geelong	Road race
Bronze medal – third place	2014 Ponferrada	Road race
Orica–AIS
World Championship
Silver medal – second place	2014 Ponferrada	Team time trial
Bronze medal – third place	2013 Toscana	Team time trial

Emma Karolina Johansson (born 23 September 1983) is a Swedish retired professional racing cyclist. Nicknamed Silver Emma, Johansson accumulated many second and third places at major championships and one-day classics. In 2013 she finished the year as number one on the UCI Women's World Ranking.

She won the silver medal in the women's road race at both the 2008 and 2016 Summer Olympics, as well as one silver and two bronze medals at the Road World championships. She also holds a record four podium finishes at the Tour of Flanders for Women, with one second and three third places. Despite her amassing of podium places, she won several one-day races, including Omloop Het Nieuwsblad, Ronde van Drenthe, Trofeo Alfredo Binda-Comune di Cittiglio, Omloop van het Hageland, Le Samyn and the Holland Hills Classic.

Johansson was also successful in stage races. She won the Thüringen Rundfahrt der Frauen three times, the Emakumeen Euskal Bira twice and the Belgium Tour once. In addition, she won one stage in the 2012 Giro d'Italia Femminile and finished in the top ten in all three of her Giro d'Italia Femminile participations.

== Biography ==
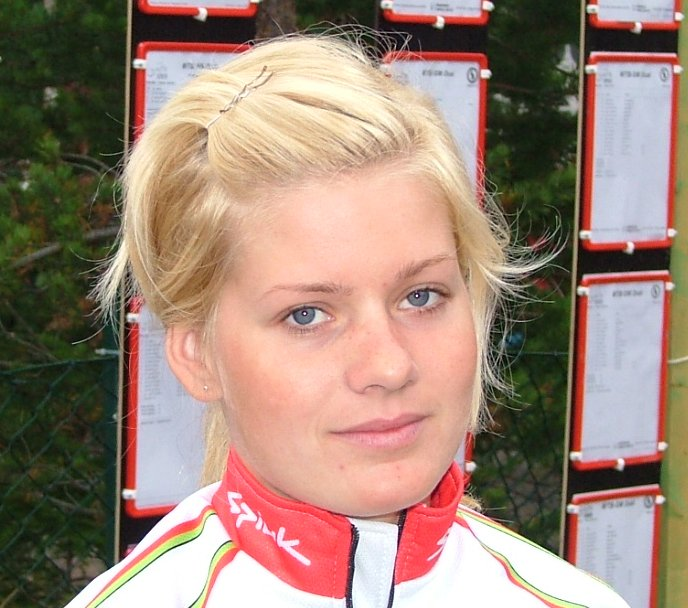
Emma Johansson in 2005

=== Early life and amateur career ===
Emma Johansson was born in Sollefteå, in northern Sweden. She engaged in cross-country skiing with the Sollefteå Ski Club at an early age, before taking an interest in mountainbiking through her older brother. She trained on military training fields, close to her house, which offered dirt roads and illuminated trails. She won her first silver medal in 1996, at the age of 12, at the Swedish national mountainbike championships in Uddevalla.

=== 2008 ===
Johansson's breakthrough year was 2008. She signed with AA-Drink Cycling Team and had a successful spring classics campaign, claiming third place at Omloop Het Nieuwsblad, 7th at the Trofeo Alfredo Binda-Comune di Cittiglio and 9th in the Tour of Flanders. On 10 August, Johansson won the silver medal in the women's road race at the Beijing Olympics. She followed an attack by Tatiana Guderzo, at 13 kilometres (8.1 miles) from the finish, which brought her in the lead group with Nicole Cooke, Christiane Soeder and Linda Villumsen. Cooke won the event in the five-woman sprint, Johansson claimed the silver ahead of Guderzo. Three day later, she placed 21st in the women's time trial.

After the Summer Olympics, she claimed the general classification of the Trophée d'Or Féminin after she won the fifth stage in a six-woman breakaway. At the World Championships Road Race in Florence, Johansson was again in a winning five-woman breakaway after she followed an attack of Marianne Vos. The race, like the Olympic road race, was won by Nicole Cooke, who beat Vos in the sprint. Johansson finished fourth.

=== 2009 ===
After finishing second in the 2009 Trofeo Alfredo Binda-Comune di Cittiglio and third in Ronde van Vlaanderen, she won the Ronde van Drenthe and took the overall lead of the UCI Women's Road World Cup, a lead which she kept after another second place in La Flèche Wallonne Féminine. Johansson was the second Swedish cyclist to wear the UCI World Cup leader jersey after Susanne Ljungskog.

=== Post-2009 ===
At the 2012 Summer Olympics she competed in the women's road race finishing 6th and in the women's time trial finishing 14th.

In August 2015, it was announced that Johansson would join Wiggle High5 on a two-year deal.

== Personal life ==
On 8 January 2011, she married the former Norwegian cyclist Martin Vestby, who is also her personal manager. They live in Zingem, Belgium, and have two children.

== Major results ==
2005
1st Time trial, National Road Championships
2006
9th Overall Trophée d'Or Féminin
2007
1st Time trial, National Road Championships
2nd GP Stad Roeselare
4th Overall Trophée d'Or Féminin
6th Road race, UCI Road World Championships
9th Overall Holland Ladies Tour
10th Drentse 8 van Dwingeloo
2008
National Road Championships

1st Time trial
2nd Road race

1st Overall Trophée d'Or Féminin

1st Stage 5

2nd Road race, Olympic Games
3rd Omloop Het Volk
4th Road race, UCI Road World Championships
4th Overall Tour Cycliste Féminin International de l'Ardèche
6th Overall Thüringen Rundfahrt der Frauen
7th Trofeo Alfredo Binda-Comune di Cittiglio
8th Drentse 8 van Dwingeloo
9th Tour of Flanders for Women
9th Tour de Berne
10th GP de Plouay – Bretagne
2009
1st Ronde van Drenthe
2nd La Flèche Wallonne Féminine
2nd Coupe du Monde Cycliste Féminine de Montréal
2nd Trofeo Alfredo Binda-Comune di Cittiglio
3rd Time trial, National Road Championships
3rd Overall Trophée d'Or Féminin
3rd Tour of Flanders for Women
3rd Novilon Eurocup Ronde van Drenthe
3rd Ronde van Gelderland
3rd Durango-Durango Emakumeen Saria
3rd Open de Suède Vårgårda
3rd Holland Hills Classic
3rd GP de Plouay – Bretagne
4th Overall Holland Ladies Tour

1st Stage 6

5th Overall Thüringen Rundfahrt der Frauen

1st Stage 5

5th GP Stad Roeselare
5th Tour de Berne
7th Grand Prix de Dottignies
2010
National Road Championships

1st Road race
2nd Time trial

1st Overall Trophée d'Or Féminin

1st Stage 5

1st Omloop Het Nieuwsblad
1st GP Mameranus
1st Stage 1 Thüringen Rundfahrt der Frauen
2nd Drentse 8 van Dwingeloo
2nd Emakumeen Saria
3rd Road race, UCI Road World Championships
3rd Overall Tour de l'Aude Cycliste Féminin
3rd Trofeo Alfredo Binda-Comune di Cittiglio
3rd La Flèche Wallonne Féminine
3rd Open de Suède Vårgårda
3rd GP de Plouay – Bretagne
4th Overall Giro della Toscana Int. Femminile – Memorial Michela Fanini
4th Tour of Flanders for Women
4th Grand Prix de Dottignies
4th GP Stad Roeselare
4th Grand Prix Elsy Jacobs
5th Overall Iurreta-Emakumeen Bira
5th Novilon Eurocup Ronde van Drenthe
6th Overall Holland Ladies Tour
6th GP Ciudad de Valladolid
9th Ronde van Gelderland
2011
National Road Championships

1st Road race
2nd Time trial

1st Overall Thüringen Rundfahrt der Frauen

1st Stage 3

1st Omloop Het Nieuwsblad
1st Omloop van het Hageland
1st Cholet Pays de Loire Dames
1st Grand Prix de Dottignies
2nd Overall Iurreta-Emakumeen Bira

1st Stage 3b

2nd Overall Giro del Trentino Alto Adige-Südtirol

1st Stage 3

2nd Overall Holland Ladies Tour
2nd Trofeo Alfredo Binda-Comune di Cittiglio
2nd La Flèche Wallonne Féminine
2nd GP Stad Roeselare
2nd Durango-Durango Emakumeen Saria
3rd GP Ciudad de Valladolid
3rd Grand Prix Elsy Jacobs
3rd Drentse 8 van Dwingeloo
4th Overall Tour of Chongming Island Stage race
4th Tour of Flanders for Women
6th Overall Energiewacht Tour
7th Overall Giro d'Italia Femminile
9th Overall Trophée d'Or Féminin

1st Stage 6

9th Ronde van Drenthe
9th Gooik–Geraardsbergen–Gooik
10th Open de Suède Vårgårda
10th GP de Plouay – Bretagne
2012
National Road Championships

1st Road race
1st Time trial

1st Overall Tour de Free State

1st Stage 3

2nd Overall Emakumeen Euskal Bira
2nd Grand Prix de Dottignies
2nd Halle-Buizingen
3rd Overall Thüringen Rundfahrt der Frauen

1st Points classification

3rd Ronde van Drenthe
4th Overall Grand Prix Elsy Jacobs
5th Overall Giro d'Italia Femminile

1st Stage 9

5th Overall Holland Ladies Tour
5th Drentse 8 van Dwingeloo
5th Trofeo Alfredo Binda-Comune di Cittiglio
5th Gooik–Geraardsbergen–Gooik
6th Road race, Olympic Games
6th Classica Citta di Padova
6th Open de Suède Vårgårda
7th Durango-Durango Emakumeen Saria
8th Novilon Euregio Cup
9th Road race, UCI Road World Championships
9th La Flèche Wallonne Féminine
9th GP Stad Roeselare
2013
1st UCI Women's Road World Rankings
National Road Championships

1st Time trial
2nd Road race

1st Overall Emakumeen Euskal Bira

1st Stages 2 & 3 (ITT)

1st Overall Thüringen Rundfahrt der Frauen

1st Points classification
1st Stages 1 & 5

1st Cholet Pays de Loire Dames
1st Gooik–Geraardsbergen–Gooik
2nd UCI Road World Championships – Women's road race
2nd Overall UCI Women's Road World Cup
2nd Overall La Route de France

1st Prologue

2nd Trofeo Alfredo Binda
2nd Durango-Durango Emakumeen Saria
2nd Draai van de Kaai
2nd Open de Suède Vårgårda
2nd GP de Plouay
3rd UCI Road World Championships – Women's team time trial
3rd Overall Grand Prix Elsy Jacobs
3rd Overall Belgium Tour
3rd Omloop Het Nieuwsblad
3rd Le Samyn des Dames
3rd Omloop van het Hageland
3rd Drentse 8 van Dwingeloo
3rd Ronde van Drenthe World Cup
3rd Tour of Flanders
3rd 7-Dorpenomloop Aalburg
3rd Open de Suède Vårgårda TTT
4th Tour of Chongming Island World Cup
5th Overall Tour of Chongming Island
5th La Flèche Wallonne Féminine
6th Overall Ladies Tour of Qatar
6th Overall Giro del Trentino Alto Adige-Südtirol
6th Holland Hills Classic
8th Ronde van Gelderland
10th UCI Road World Championships – Women's time trial
2014
National Road Championships

1st Road race
1st Time trial

1st National Cyclo-cross Championships
1st Overall BeNe Ladies Tour

1st Stage 2a (ITT)

1st Le Samyn
1st Cholet Pays de Loire Dames
1st Trofeo Alfredo Binda-Comune di Cittiglio
1st Holland Hills Classic
1st Stage 6 Holland Ladies Tour
UCI Road World Championships

2nd Team time trial
3rd Road race

2nd Overall UCI Women's Road World Cup
2nd Overall The Women's Tour

1st Stage 1

2nd Omloop Het Nieuwsblad
2nd Omloop van het Hageland
2nd Gooik–Geraardsbergen–Gooik
3rd Novilon EDR Cup
3rd Tour of Flanders
3rd 7-Dorpenomloop Aalburg
3rd Durango-Durango Emakumeen Saria
4th Overall Ladies Tour of Qatar
5th Overall Holland Ladies Tour

1st Stage 6

5th Drentse 8 van Dwingeloo
5th Ronde van Gelderland
6th Overall Ladies Tour of Norway
6th Overall Belgium Tour
6th GP de Plouay
7th Overall Festival Luxembourgeois du cyclisme féminin Elsy Jacobs
8th Overall Emakumeen Euskal Bira
8th Ronde van Drenthe World Cup
8th La Course by Le Tour de France
8th Sparkassen Giro
9th Dwars door de Westhoek
10th Overall Giro d'Italia Femminile
10th Open de Suède Vårgårda
2015
National Road Championships

1st Road race
1st Time trial

1st Overall Thüringen Rundfahrt der Frauen
1st Overall Belgium Tour
1st Durango-Durango Emakumeen Saria
2nd Holland Hills Classic
2nd GP de Plouay
3rd Overall Emakumeen Euskal Bira

1st Points classification
1st Stages 2 & 4

3rd Le Samyn des Dames
4th Overall The Women's Tour
4th Marianne Vos Classic
5th Road race, UCI Road World Championships
5th Overall Ladies Tour of Qatar
7th Overall Ladies Tour of Norway
7th Gooik–Geraardsbergen–Gooik
7th La Course by Le Tour de France
8th Ronde van Drenthe World Cup
8th Crescent Women World Cup Vårgårda
10th La Flèche Wallonne Féminine
10th Dwars door de Westhoek
2016
National Road Championships

1st Road race
1st Time trial

1st Overall Emakumeen Euskal Bira

1st Points classification
1st Stages 1 & 2

2nd Road race, Olympic Games
2nd Le Samyn des Dames
2nd Tour of Flanders
3rd Strade Bianche
3rd Durango-Durango Emakumeen Saria
4th Trofeo Alfredo Binda-Comune di Cittiglio
5th Overall Auensteiner–Radsporttage

1st Mountains classification

7th Overall Belgium Tour
7th La Flèche Wallonne Féminine
8th Road race, UEC European Road Championships
8th Overall Tour of California
8th Overall The Women's Tour
8th Acht van Westerveld
9th Overall Thüringen Rundfahrt der Frauen

1st Mountains classification

9th Gent–Wevelgem
9th Holland Hills Classic

=== General classification timelines ===
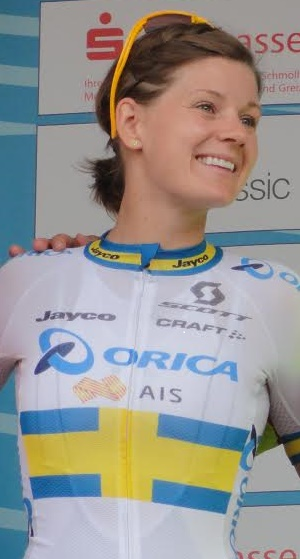
Johansson at the 2015 Thüringen Rundfahrt der Frauen; she won the race for the third time in five years, equalling Judith Arndt's record of overall race victories.

Grand Tour results timeline
Stage race	2005	2006	2007	2008	2009	2010	2011	2012	2013	2014	2015	2016
Giro d'Italia Femminile	—	47	—	—	—	—	7	5	—	10	—	—
Stage race results timeline
Stage race	2005	2006	2007	2008	2009	2010	2011	2012	2013	2014	2015	2016
Tour de l'Aude Cycliste Féminin	—	—	—	13	17	3	Race did not exist					
Grand Prix Elsy Jacobs	Race did not exist			—	28	4	3	4	3	7	16	13
Tour of California	Race did not exist										—	8
Emakumeen Euskal Bira	—	—	—	14	DNF	5	2	2	1	8	3	1
Giro del Trentino Alto Adige-Südtirol	—	—	—	—	—	—	2	—	6	—	—	—
The Women's Tour	Race did not exist									2	4	8
Thüringen Rundfahrt der Frauen	—	—	—	6	5	DNF	1	3	1	—	1	9
Belgium Tour	Race did not exist							—	3	6	1	7
Ladies Tour of Norway	Race did not exist									6	7	—
Holland Ladies Tour	78	—	9	—	4	6	2	5	—	5	—	11
Giro della Toscana Int. Femminile	—	—	—	—	—	4	—	—	DNF	—	—	—

=== Classics results timelines ===
Classics results timeline
Race	2006	2007	2008	2009	2010	2011	2012	2013	2014	2015	2016
Omloop Het Nieuwsblad	—	—	3	40	1	1	—	3	2	14	11
Tour of Flanders	81	55	9	3	4	4	12	3	3	13	2
Trofeo Alfredo Binda-Comune di Cittiglio	—	45	7	2	3	2	5	2	1	—	4
La Flèche Wallonne	68	34	12	2	3	2	9	5	11	10	7

=== Major championships timelines ===
Major championships timeline
Event		2002	2003	2004	2005	2006	2007	2008	2009	2010	2011	2012	2013	2014	2015	2016
Olympic Games	Time trial	Not held		—	Not held			21	Not held			14	Not held			—
Olympic Games	Road race	Not held		—	Not held			2	Not held			6	Not held			2
World Championships	Time trial	—	—	—	—	—	26	14	—	11	14	12	10	—	17	—
World Championships	Road race	—	—	—	100	63	6	4	11	3	14	9	2	3	5	49
National Championships	Time trial	5	—	6	1	4	1	1	3	2	2	1	1	1	1	1
National Championships	Road race	—	—	4	7	4	6	2	5	1	1	1	2	1	1	1

Legend
—	Did not compete
DNF	Did not finish
