= 2010 Holland Ladies Tour =

Race details
- Dates: August 31 – September 5
- Stages: 7
- Distance: 641.3 km (398.5 mi)
- Winning time: 15h 44' 13"

Results
Jersey awarded to the overall winner	Winner	Marianne Vos (NED)	(Nederland Bloeit)
	Second	Kirsten Wild (NED)	(Cervelo Test Team)
	Third	Ellen van Dijk (NED)	(Team HTC-Columbia)

The 13th edition of the annual Holland Ladies Tour was held from August 31 to September 5, 2010. The women's stage race with an UCI rating of 2.2 started in Nuenen, and finished in Hellendoorn.

== Stages ==
=== 2010-08-31: Nuenen — Gerwen (112 km) ===
Place	Stage 1		General Classification	
Place	Name	Time	Name	Time
1.	Ina-Yoko Teutenberg (GER)	02:47.47	Ina-Yoko Teutenberg (GER)	02:47.47
2.	Marianne Vos (NED)	s.t.	Marianne Vos (NED)	s.t.
3.	Kirsten Wild (NED)	s.t.	Kirsten Wild (NED)	s.t.

=== 2010-09-01: Leende — Leende (107 km) ===
Place	Stage 2		General Classification	
Place	Name	Time	Name	Time
1.	Martine Bras (NED)	02:36.17	Martine Bras (NED)	05:23.48
2.	Valentina Bastianelli (ITA)	s.t.		
3.	Janneke Ensing (NED)	+0.04		

=== 2010-09-02: Gieten — Gieten (108 km) ===
Place	Stage 3		General Classification	
Place	Name	Time	Name	Time
1.	Marianne Vos (NED)	02:40.09	Martine Bras (NED)	08:04.23
2.	Kirsten Wild (NED)	s.t.		
3.	Giorgia Bronzini (ITA)	s.t.		

=== 2010-09-03: Diepenheim — Diepenheim (97 km) ===
Place	Stage 4		General Classification	
Place	Name	Time	Name	Time
1.	Kirsten Wild (NED)	02:18.12	Martine Bras (NED)	10:22.35
2.	Marianne Vos (NED)	s.t.		
3.	Giorgia Bronzini (ITA)	s.t.		

=== 2010-09-04: Rijssen — Rijssen (80.4 km) ===
Place	Stage 5		General Classification	
Place	Name	Time	Name	Time
1.	Kirsten Wild (GER)	01:57.20	Martine Bras (NED)	12:19.55
2.	Marianne Vos (NED)	s.t.		
3.	Shelley Olds (USA)	s.t.		

=== 2010-09-04: Rijssen — Rijssen (12.9 km) ===
Place	Stage 6 (Individual Time Trial)		General Classification	
Place	Name	Time	Name	Time
1.	Ellen van Dijk (NED)	00:17.04	Kirsten Wild (NED)	12:37.09
2.	Marianne Vos (NED)	s.t.		
3.	Kirsten Wild (NED)	+0.01		

=== 2010-09-05: Hellendoorn — Hellendoorn (121.5 km) ===
Place	Stage 7		General Classification	
Place	Name	Time	Name	Time
1.	Marianne Vos (NED)	03:07.16	Marianne Vos (NED)	15:44.13
2.	Kirsten Wild (NED)	s.t.	Kirsten Wild (NED)	+0.03
3.	Shelley Olds (USA)	s.t.	Ellen van Dijk (NED)	+0.52

== Final standings ==
=== General Classification ===
RANK	NAME	TEAM	TIME
1.	Marianne Vos (NED)	DSB Bank - Nederland Bloeit	15:44.13
2.	Kirsten Wild (NED)	Cervelo Test Team	+ 0.03
3.	Ellen van Dijk (NED)	Team HTC-Columbia	+ 0.52
4.	Charlotte Becker (GER)	Cervelo Test Team	+ 1.02
5.	Martine Bras (NED)	Gauss Rdz Ormu - Colnago	+ 1.17
6.	Emma Johansson (SWE)	Red Sun Cycling Team	+ 1.20
7.	Annemiek van Vleuten (NED)	Nederland Bloeit	+ 1.21
8.	Trixi Worrack (GER)	Team Cycling Noris	+ 1.28
9.	Sarah Düster (GER)	Cervelo Test Team	+ 1.37
10.	Emilia Fahlin (SWE)	Team HTC-Columbia	+ 2.38
