= Semra Yetiş =

Turkish cyclist (born 1987)

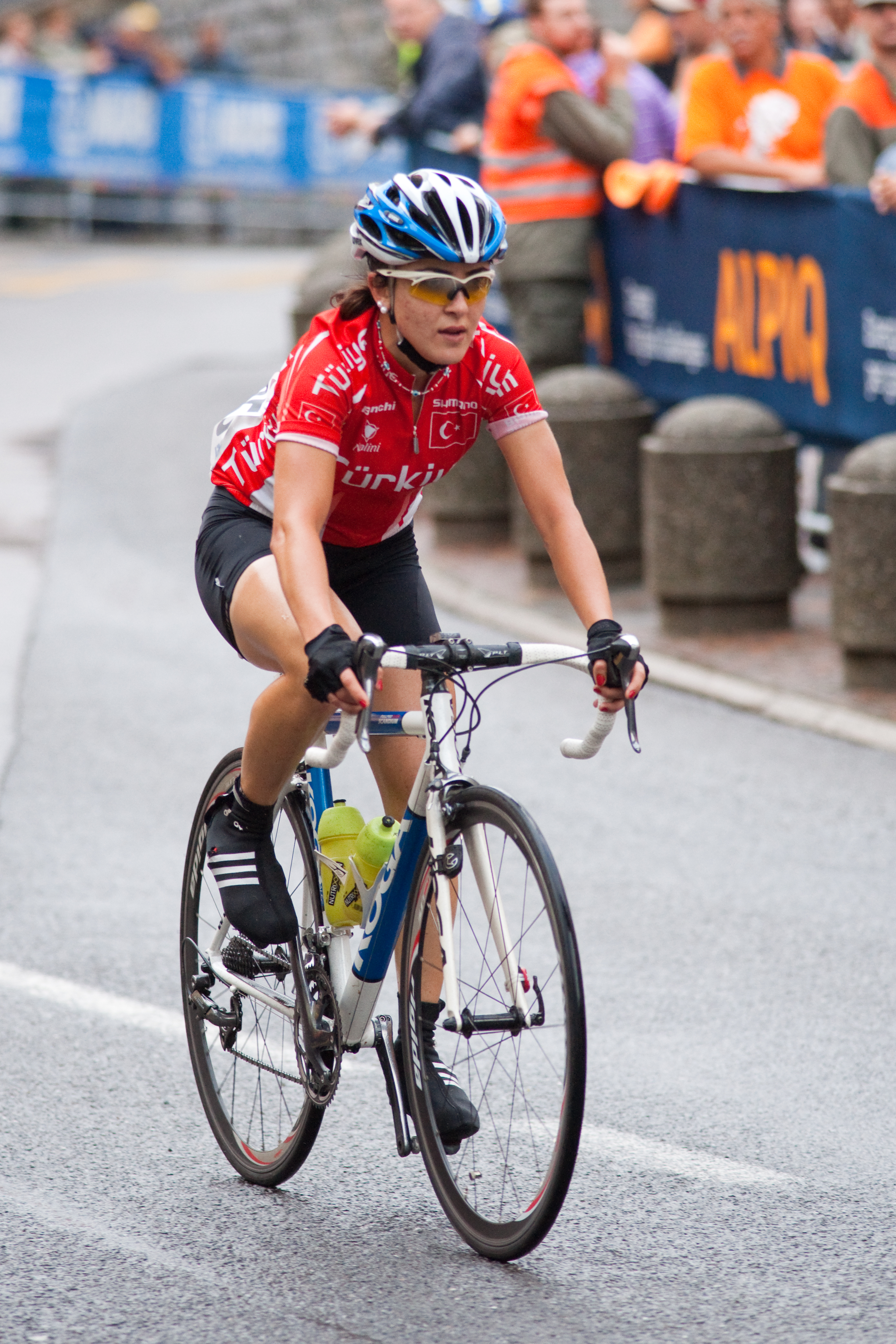
- Semra Yetiş during the 2009 UCI Road World Championships in Mendrisio, Switzerland.

Personal information
- Born: October 1, 1987 (age 39) Çankırı, Turkey
- Height: 169 cm (5 ft 7 in)
- Weight: 58 kg (128 lb)

Cycling career
- Sport: Cycling
- Disciplines: Mountain biking; Road
- Role: Rider

Amateur teams
- 2009–2010: Koga Miyata
- 2011–2012: Istanbulspor
- 2012–2013: Brisaspor
- 2013–2014: Ankara Gençlik Hizmetleri SK
- 2015: Karaman GSK
- 2019: Bariş Cycling Academy

Professional teams
- 2007–2009: Goldcity Alanya
- 2010–2011: MKE Ankaragücü

Semra Yetiş (born October 1, 1987) is a Turkish road cyclist and mountain biker.

She competed between 2007 and 2009 for the first Turkish UCI mountain biking team Goldcity Alanya (UCI team code: GCA). Following the dissolution of the team in early 2009, she went to Germany to ride on Koga Miyata Team for one season. Upon returning home, she signed for MKE Ankaragücü racing in 2010. In 2011, Yetiş was with Istanbulspor and in 2012 with Brisaspor, Kocaeli. From the 2013 season, she competed for Ankara Gençlik Hizmetleri SK.

Semra Yetiş became the first ever Turkish female cyclist to qualify for participation at the 2009 UCI Road World Championships – Women's road race held in Mendrisio, Switzerland.

== Major results ==
=== Mountain biking ===
2006
1st Cross-country marathon, National Mountain Bike Championships
2007
2nd Cross-country, National Mountain Bike Championships
2nd Gaziantep Mountainbike, Gaziantep
2nd Polonez Adampol Cup, Istanbul
2nd Cross-country, Kartepe Cup, Kocaeli
2nd Cross-country, İzmir Cup, İzmir
2nd Cross-country, Yalova Aksa Cup, Yalova
3rd Ankara MTB Cup, Ankara
2008
1st Cross-country, Balkan Mountain Bike Championships
1st Cross-country, National Mountain Bike Championships
1st Gaziantep Mountainbike
1st Gaziantep Mountainbike (b)
2nd Alaçatı-İzmir Mountainbike
2nd Tuzla, Mountainbike
3rd Finike/Antalya Mountainbike
3rd Goreme/Nevsehir Mountainbike
2010
1st Adana MTB Cup
2nd Cross-country, National Mountain Bike Championships
2011
2nd Cross-country, National Mountain Bike Championships
2012
1st Cross-country, National Mountain Bike Championships
2013
2nd Cross-country, National Mountain Bike Championships
2014
2nd Cross-country, National Mountain Bike Championships
2015
2nd Cross-country, National Mountain Bike Championships
2016
2nd Cross-country, National Mountain Bike Championships
2017
3rd Cross-country, National Mountain Bike Championships
2021
2nd Cross-country, National Mountain Bike Championships
2022
National Mountain Bike Championships

2nd Cross-country
2nd Cross-country eliminator

=== Road ===
2008
National Road Championships

1st Road race
2nd Time trial

2009
3rd Time trial, National Road Championships
2012
National Road Championships

1st Road race
2nd Time trial

2013
1st Time trial, National Road Championships
2014
National Road Championships

1st Road race
1st Time trial

2015
National Road Championships

2nd Road race
3rd Time trial

== See also ==
- Turkish women in sports
