= 2010 Emakumeen Saria =

Race details
- Dates: 8 June 2010
- Stages: 1

Results
| | Winner | Marianne Vos (Netherlands) |
| | Second | Emma Johansson (Sweden) |
| | Third | Annemiek van Vleuten (Netherlands) |

The 2010 Durango-Durango Emakumeen Saria was the sixth running of the Durango-Durango Emakumeen Saria, a women's bicycle race held annually in Spain. It took place on June 8, 2010, with Marianne Vos, Emma Johansson and Annemiek van Vleuten taking first, second and third place, respectively.
