= Durango-Durango Emakumeen Saria =

Spanish one-day road cycling race

Race details
- Date: May or June
- Region: Spain
- Discipline: Road
- Type: Single-day
- Web site: www.duranguesa.com/pag.php?id=12&pag=durango

History
- First edition: 2001
- Editions: 25 (as of 2026)
- First winner: Sara Felloni (ITA)
- Most wins: Marianne Vos (NED) (4 wins)
- Most recent: Paula Blasi (ESP)

Durango-Durango Emakumeen Saria is a women's bicycle race held in Spain. The race was organised as a 1.2 event from 2005 and 2019, and is now organised as a 1.1-categorised race. The race is usually held over a distance of 110–120 kilometres (68–75 miles).

== Winners ==
Year	Country	Rider	Team
2001	Italy	Sara Felloni	
2002	Spain	Joane Somarriba	
2003	Spain	Joane Somarriba	
2004	Spain	Joane Somarriba	
2005	Netherlands	Mirjam Melchers	
2006	Sweden	Susanne Ljungskog	
2007	Lithuania	Edita Pučinskaitė	
2008	No race		
2009	Italy	Noemi Cantele	
2010	Netherlands	Marianne Vos	Nederland bloeit
2011	Netherlands	Marianne Vos	Nederland bloeit
2012	Great Britain	Emma Pooley	AA Drink–leontien.nl
2013	Netherlands	Marianne Vos	Rabobank-Liv Giant
2014	Netherlands	Marianne Vos	Rabobank-Liv Woman Cycling Team
2015	Sweden	Emma Johansson	Orica–AIS
2016	United States	Megan Guarnier	Boels–Dolmans
2017	Netherlands	Annemiek van Vleuten	Orica–Scott
2018	Netherlands	Anna van der Breggen	Boels–Dolmans
2019	Australia	Lucy Kennedy_(cyclist)	Mitchelton–Scott
2020	Netherlands	Annemiek van Vleuten	Mitchelton–Scott
2021	Netherlands	Anna van der Breggen	SD Worx
2022	Netherlands	Pauliena Rooijakkers	Canyon//SRAM
2023	South Africa	Ashleigh Moolman Pasio	AG Insurance–Soudal–Quick-Step
2024	France	Cédrine Kerbaol	Ceratizit–WNT Pro Cycling
2025	Canada	Isabella Holmgren	Lidl–Trek
2026	Spain	Paula Blasi	UAE Team ADQ
