= 2013 Ronde van Drenthe =

2013 Drentse 8 van Dwingeloo
Race details
- Dates: 7 March 2013
- Stages: 1
- Distance: 141.2 km (87.7 mi)
- Winning time: 3h 26' 50"

Results
	Winner	Marianne Vos (Netherlands)	(Rabobank-Liv Giant)
	Second	Giorgia Bronzini (Italy)	(Wiggle–Honda)
	Third	Emma Johansson (Sweden)	(Orica–AIS)

The 2013 Drentse 8 van Dwingeloo was the 7th running of the women's Drentse 8 van Dwingeloo, a women's bicycle race in the Netherlands. It was held on 7 March 2013 over a distance of 141.2 kilometres (87.7 miles), starting and finishing in Dwingeloo. It was rated by the UCI as a 1.2 category race.

== Results ==
	Cyclist	Team	Time
1	Marianne Vos (NED)	Rabobank-Liv Giant	3h 26' 50"
2	Giorgia Bronzini (ITA)	Wiggle–Honda	s.t.
3	Emma Johansson (SWE)	Orica–AIS	s.t.
4	Shelley Olds (USA)	Team TIBCO–To The Top	s.t.
5	Elena Cecchini (ITA)	Faren-Let's Go Finland Team	s.t.
6	Ellen van Dijk (NED)	Specialized–lululemon	s.t.
7	Chloe Hosking (AUS)	Hitec Products–UCK	s.t.
8	Lucy Garner (GBR)	Team Argos–Shimano	s.t.
9	Megan Guarnier (USA)	Rabobank-Liv Giant	s.t.
10	Alexandra Burchenkova (RUS)	RusVelo	s.t.

s.t. = same time
