= 2011 Durango-Durango Emakumeen Saria =

Race details
- Dates: 7 June 2011
- Stages: 1

Results
	Winner	Marianne Vos (Netherlands)
	Second	Emma Johansson (Sweden)
	Third	Judith Arndt (Germany)

The 2011 Durango-Durango Emakumeen Saria was the tenth running of the Durango-Durango Emakumeen Saria, a women's bicycle race held annually in Spain. It took place on June 7, 2011, with Marianne Vos, Emma Johansson and Judith Arndt taking first, second and third place, respectively.
