= 2009 Holland Ladies Tour =

Race details
- Dates: September 1 – September 6
- Stages: 6
- Distance: 590.5 km (366.9 mi)
- Winning time: 15h 13' 00"

Results
Jersey awarded to the overall winner	Winner	Marianne Vos (NED)	(DSB Bank - Nederland Bloeit)
	Second	Kirsten Wild (NED)	(Cervelo Test Team)
	Third	Ina-Yoko Teutenberg (GER)	(Team Columbia-HTC Women)

The 12th edition of the annual Holland Ladies Tour was held from September 1 to September 6, 2009. The women's stage race with an UCI rating of 2.2 started in Nuenen, and ended on the Cauberg in Valkenburg.

== Stages ==
=== 2009-09-01: Nuenen — Gerwen (123 km) ===
Place	Stage 1		General Classification	
Place	Name	Time	Name	Time
1.	Kirsten Wild (NED)	03:05.57	Kirsten Wild (NED)	03:05.57
2.	Marianne Vos (NED)	—	Marianne Vos (NED)	—
3.	Ina-Yoko Teutenberg (GER)	—	Ina-Yoko Teutenberg (GER)	—

=== 2009-09-02: Schijndel — Schijndel (13.3 km) ===
Place	Stage 2 (Individual Time Trial)		General Classification	
Place	Name	Time	Name	Time
1.	Ellen van Dijk (NED)	00:17.31	Kirsten Wild (NED)	03:23.28
2.	Linda Villumsen (NZL)	+0.09		
3.	Marianne Vos (NED)	+0.10		

=== 2009-09-03: Gieten — Gieten (108 km) ===
Place	Stage 3		General Classification	
Place	Name	Time	Name	Time
1.	Kirsten Wild (NED)	02:51.33	Kirsten Wild (NED)	06:41.51
2.	Ina-Yoko Teutenberg (GER)	—		
3.	Marianne Vos (NED)	—		

=== 2009-09-04: Rijssen — Rijssen (124.8 km) ===
Place	Stage 4		General Classification	
Place	Name	Time	Name	Time
1.	Kirsten Wild (NED)	03:19.39	Kirsten Wild (NED)	09:34.18
2.	Ina-Yoko Teutenberg (GER)	—		
3.	Suzanne de Goede (NED)	—		

=== 2009-09-05: Boxtel — Boxtel (121.5 km) ===
Place	Stage 5		General Classification	
Place	Name	Time	Name	Time
1.	Ina-Yoko Teutenberg (GER)	02:42.13	Kirsten Wild (NED)	12:16.41
2.	Kirsten Wild (NED)	—		
3.	Emma Johansson (SWE)	—		

=== 2009-09-06: Valkenburg — Valkenburg (Cauberg) (112.6 km) ===
Place	Stage 6		General Classification	
Place	Name	Time	Name	Time
1.	Emma Johansson (SWE)	02:55.59	Marianne Vos (NED)	12:16.41
2.	Marianne Vos (NED)	—	Kirsten Wild (NED)	+0.16
3.	Loes Gunnewijk (NED)	+0.04	Ina-Yoko Teutenberg (GER)	+0.40

== Final standings ==
=== General Classification ===
RANK	NAME	TEAM	TIME
1.	Marianne Vos (NED)	DSB Bank - Nederland Bloeit	15:13.00
2.	Kirsten Wild (NED)	Cervelo Test Team	+ 0.16
3.	Ina-Yoko Teutenberg (GER)	Team Columbia Women	+ 0.40
4.	Emma Johansson (SWE)	Red Sun Cycling Team	+ 0.51
5.	Loes Gunnewijk (NED)	Team Flexpoint	+ 1.01
6.	Trixi Worrack (GER)	Equipe Nürnberger Versicherung	+ 1.09
7.	Linda Villumsen (NZL)	Team Columbia Women	+ 1.09
8.	Chantal Blaak (NED)	Leontien.nl	+ 1.19
9.	Iris Slappendel (NED)	Team Flexpoint	+ 1.51
10.	Annemiek van Vleuten (NED)	DSB Bank - Nederland Bloeit	+ 2.05

=== Points classification ===
RANK	NAME	TEAM	POINTS
1.	Kirsten Wild (NED)	Cervelo Test Team	106
2.	Ina-Yoko Teutenberg (GER)	Team Columbia Women	93
3.	Marianne Vos (NED)	DSB Bank-Nederland Bloeit	83
4.	Emma Johansson (SWE)	Red Sun Cycling Team	77
5.	Ellen van Dijk (NED)	Vrienden van het Platteland	76
