= 2006 Omloop Het Volk (women's race) =

Race details
- Dates: 12 March 2006
- Stages: 1
- Distance: 86 km (53 mi)
- Winning time: 2h 17' 00"

Results
| | Winner | Suzanne de Goede (NED) | (AA-Drink Cycling Team) |
| | Second | Mirjam Melchers-Van Poppel (NED) | (Buitenpoort - Flexpoint Team) |
| | Third | Tanja Hennes (GER) | (Buitenpoort - Flexpoint Team) |

The 2006 Omloop Het Volk was the inaugural edition of the women's Omloop Het Volk road cycling one-day race, which was held on 12 March.

The race was won by Dutch rider Suzanne de Goede.

== Results ==
Final general classification
| Rank | Rider | Team | Time |
|---|---|---|---|
| 1 | Suzanne de Goede (NED) | AA-Drink Cycling Team | 2h 17' 00" |
| 2 | Mirjam Melchers-Van Poppel (NED) | Buitenpoort - Flexpoint Team | + 0" |
| 3 | Tanja Hennes (GER) | Buitenpoort - Flexpoint Team | + 0" |
| 4 | Debby Mansveld (NED) | Vlaanderen–Capri Sonne–T Interim | + 0" |
| 5 | Chantal Beltman (NED) | Vrienden van het Platteland | + 0" |
| 6 | Emilie Jeannot (FRA) | - | + 0" |
| 7 | Ludivine Henrion (BEL) | - | + 0" |
| 8 | Loes Gunnewijk (NED) | Buitenpoort - Flexpoint Team | + 0" |
| 9 | Veronique Belleter (BEL) | - | + 0" |
| 10 | Martine Bras (NED) | - | + 0" |
