= 2012 Emakumeen Euskal Bira =

Race details
- Dates: 7–10 June 2012
- Stages: 4
- Distance: 320.4 km (199.1 mi)
- Winning time: 8h 30' 59"

Results
	Winner	Judith Arndt (Germany)	(GreenEDGE–AIS)
	Second	Emma Johansson (Sweden)	(Hitec Products)
	Third	Annemiek van Vleuten (Netherlands)	(Rabobank Women Cycling Team)
	Points	Annemiek van Vleuten (Netherlands)	(Rabobank Women Cycling Team)
	Mountains	Emma Pooley (United Kingdom)	(AA Drink–leontien.nl)
	Youth	Sarah-lena Hofmann (Germany)	(Germany national team)
	Sprints	Valentina Scandolara (Italy)	(S.C. Michela Fanini Rox)

The 2012 Emakumeen Euskal Bira was the 25th edition of the Emakumeen Bira, a women's cycling stage race in Spain. It was rated by the UCI as category 2.1, and was held between 7 and 10 June 2012.

== Stages ==
=== Stage 1 ===
7 June 2012 – Iurreta to Matiena, 97 km (60.3 mi)

Stage 1 result

	Rider	Team	Time
1	Ina-Yoko Teutenberg (GER)	Team Specialized–lululemon	2h 29' 44"
2	Shelley Olds (USA)	AA Drink–leontien.nl	s.t.
3	Trixi Worrack (GER)	Team Specialized–lululemon	s.t.

General classification after stage 1

	Rider	Team	Time
1	Ina-Yoko Teutenberg (GER)	Team Specialized–lululemon	2h 29' 44"
2	Shelley Olds (USA)	AA Drink–leontien.nl	s.t.
3	Trixi Worrack (GER)	Team Specialized–lululemon	s.t.

=== Stage 2 ===
8 June 2012 – Lekeitio – Lekeitio, 98 km (60.9 mi)

Stage 2 result

	Rider	Team	Time
1	Emma Pooley (GBR)	AA Drink–leontien.nl	2h 35' 31"
2	Annemiek van Vleuten (NED)	Rabobank Women Cycling Team	+ 20"
3	Trixi Worrack (GER)	Team Specialized–lululemon	+ 20"

General classification after stage 2

	Rider	Team	Time
1	Emma Pooley (GBR)	AA Drink–leontien.nl	5h 05' 27"
2	Annemiek van Vleuten (NED)	Rabobank Women Cycling Team	+ 8"
3	Trixi Worrack (GER)	Team Specialized–lululemon	+ 8"

=== Stage 3 ===
9 June 2012 – Orduña to Orduña (individual time trial), 13.4 km (8.3 mi)

Stage 3 result

	Rider	Team	Time
1	Linda Villumsen (NZL)	GreenEDGE–AIS	18' 21"
2	Judith Arndt (GER)	GreenEDGE–AIS	+ 3"
3	Ellen van Dijk (NED)	Team Specialized–lululemon	+ 6"

General classification after stage 3

	Rider	Team	Time
1	Emma Pooley (GBR)	AA Drink–leontien.nl	5h 23' 58"
2	Judith Arndt (GER)	GreenEDGE–AIS	+ 1"
3	Emma Johansson (SWE)	Hitec Products–Mistral Home Cycling Team	+ 8"

=== Stage 4 ===
10 June 2012 – Orduña to Iurreta, 112 km (69.6 mi)

Stage 4 result

	Rider	Team	Time
1	Annemiek van Vleuten (NED)	Rabobank Women Cycling Team	3h 06' 59"
2	Emma Johansson (SWE)	Hitec Products–Mistral Home Cycling Team	+ 1"
3	Trixi Worrack (GER)	Team Specialized–lululemon	+ 1"

General classification after stage 4

	Rider	Team	Time
1	Judith Arndt (GER)	GreenEDGE–AIS	8h 30' 59"
2	Emma Johansson (SWE)	Hitec Products–Mistral Home Cycling Team	+ 7"
3	Annemiek van Vleuten (NED)	Rabobank Women Cycling Team	+ 14"

== Final classifications ==
=== General classification ===
	Rider	Team	Time
1	Judith Arndt (GER)	GreenEDGE–AIS	8h 30' 59"
2	Emma Johansson (SWE)	Hitec Products–Mistral Home Cycling Team	+ 7"
3	Annemiek van Vleuten (NED)	Rabobank Women Cycling Team	+ 14"
4	Alena Amialiusik (BLR)	BePink	+ 39"
5	Sharon Laws (GBR)	AA Drink–leontien.nl	+ 42"
6	Lucinda Brand (NED)	AA Drink–leontien.nl	+ 55"
7	Trixi Worrack (GER)	Team Specialized–lululemon	+ 1' 21"
8	Emma Pooley (GBR)	AA Drink–leontien.nl	+ 1' 50"
9	Anna Sanchis Chafer (ESP)	Bizkaia–Durango	+ 2' 05"
10	Claudia Häusler (GER)	GreenEDGE–AIS	+ 2' 30"
