= 2013 Emakumeen Euskal Bira =

Race details
- Dates: 6–9 June 2012
- Stages: 4
- Distance: 296.9 km (184.5 mi)

Results
Jersey awarded to the overall winner	Winner	Emma Johansson	(Orica–AIS)
	Second	Elisa Longo Borghini	(Hitec Products UCK)
	Third	Evelyn Stevens	(Team Specialized–lululemon)
Jersey awarded to the points classification winner	Points	Marianne Vos	(Rabobank-Liv Giant)
Jersey awarded to the mountains classification winner	Mountains	Elisa Longo Borghini	(Hitec Products UCK)
	Team	Orica–AIS	

The 2013 Emakumeen Euskal Bira will be the 26th edition of the Emakumeen Bira, a women's cycling stage race in Spain. It was rated by the UCI as category 2.1, and was held between 6 and 9 June 2013.

== Stages ==
=== Stage 1 ===
6 June 2013 – Iurreta to Iurreta, 91.3 km (56.7 mi)

The first stage ended with a bunch sprint.

Stage 1 result

	Rider	Team	Time
1	Marianne Vos (NED)	Rabobank-Liv Giant	2h 23' 00"
2	Adrie Visser (NED)	Boels–Dolmans Cycling Team	s.t.
3	Rossella Ratto (ITA)	Hitec Products UCK	s.t.
4	Annemiek van Vleuten (NED)	Rabobank-Liv Giant	s.t.
5	Christine Majerus (LUX)	Sengers Ladies Cycling Team	s.t.

General classification after stage 1

	Rider	Team	Time
1	Marianne Vos (NED)	Rabobank-Liv Giant	2h 23' 00"
2	Adrie Visser (NED)	Boels–Dolmans Cycling Team	s.t.
3	Rossella Ratto (ITA)	Hitec Products UCK	s.t.
4	Annemiek van Vleuten (NED)	Rabobank-Liv Giant	s.t.
5	Christine Majerus (LUX)	Sengers Ladies Cycling Team	s.t.

=== Stage 2 ===
7 June 2013 – Aretxabaleta to Aretxabaleta, 103.5 km (64.3 mi)

Stage 2 result

	Rider	Team	Time
1	Emma Johansson (SWE)	Orica–AIS	2h 35' 59"
2	Elisa Longo Borghini (ITA)	Hitec Products UCK	s.t.
3	Marianne Vos (NED)	Rabobank-Liv Giant	+ 26"
4	Tiffany Cromwell (AUS)	Orica–AIS	+ 55"
5	Evelyn Stevens (USA)	Team Specialized–lululemon	+ 1' 22"

General classification after stage 2

	Rider	Team	Time
1	Emma Johansson (SWE)	Orica–AIS	4h 58' 59"
2	Elisa Longo Borghini (ITA)	Hitec Products UCK	s.t.
3	Marianne Vos (NED)	Rabobank-Liv Giant	+ 26"
4	Tiffany Cromwell (AUS)	Orica–AIS	+ 55"
5	Evelyn Stevens (USA)	Team Specialized–lululemon	+ 1' 22"

=== Stage 3 ===
8 June 2013 – Orduña to Orduña (individual time trial), 13.4 km (8.3 mi)

Stage 3 result

	Rider	Team	Time
1	Emma Johansson (SWE)	Orica–AIS	18' 55"
2	Ellen van Dijk (NED)	Team Specialized–lululemon	+ 38"
3	Elisa Longo Borghini (ITA)	Hitec Products UCK	+38"
4	Anna van der Breggen (NED)	Sengers Ladies Cycling Team	+ 38"
5	Evelyn Stevens (USA)	Team Specialized–lululemon	+ 52"

General classification after stage 2

	Rider	Team	Time
1	Emma Johansson (SWE)	Orica–AIS	5h 17' 54"
2	Elisa Longo Borghini (ITA)	Hitec Products UCK	+ 38"
3	Marianne Vos (NED)	Rabobank-Liv Giant	+ 1' 51"
4	Evelyn Stevens (USA)	Team Specialized–lululemon	+ 2' 14"
5	Tiffany Cromwell (AUS)	Orica–AIS	+ 2' 25"

=== Stage 4 ===
9 June 2013 – Fruiz to Gatika, 88.7 km (55.1 mi)

Stage 4 result

	Rider	Team	Time
1	Elisa Longo Borghini (ITA)	Hitec Products UCK	2h 38' 53"
2	Evelyn Stevens (USA)	Team Specialized–lululemon	s.t.
3	Emma Johansson (SWE)	Orica–AIS	s.t.
4	Anna van der Breggen (NED)	Sengers Ladies Cycling Team	s.t.
5	Megan Gaurnier (USA)	Rabobank-Liv Giant	+ 1'06"

Final general classification after stage 4

	Rider	Team	Time
1	Emma Johansson (SWE)	Orica–AIS	7h 56' 47"
2	Elisa Longo Borghini (ITA)	Hitec Products UCK	s.t.
3	Evelyn Stevens (USA)	Team Specialized–lululemon	+ 2' 14"
4	Anna van der Breggen (NED)	Sengers Ladies Cycling Team	2' 45"
5	Marianne Vos (NED)	Rabobank-Liv Giant	+ 2' 57"

== Classification progress ==
Stage	Winner	General classification	Points classification	Mountains classification	Team classification
1	Marianne Vos	Marianne Vos	Adrie Visser	Elisa Longo Borghini	Rabobank–Liv Giant
2	Emma Johansson	Emma Johansson	Marianne Vos	Elisa Longo Borghini	Orica–AIS
3 (ITT)	Emma Johansson	Emma Johansson	Marianne Vos	Elisa Longo Borghini	Orica–AIS
4	Elisa Longo Borghini	Emma Johansson	Marianne Vos	Elisa Longo Borghini	Orica–AIS
Final		Emma Johansson	Marianne Vos	Elisa Longo Borghini	Orica–AIS

== See also ==
- 2013 in women's road cycling
