= 2012 Giro d'Italia Femminile =

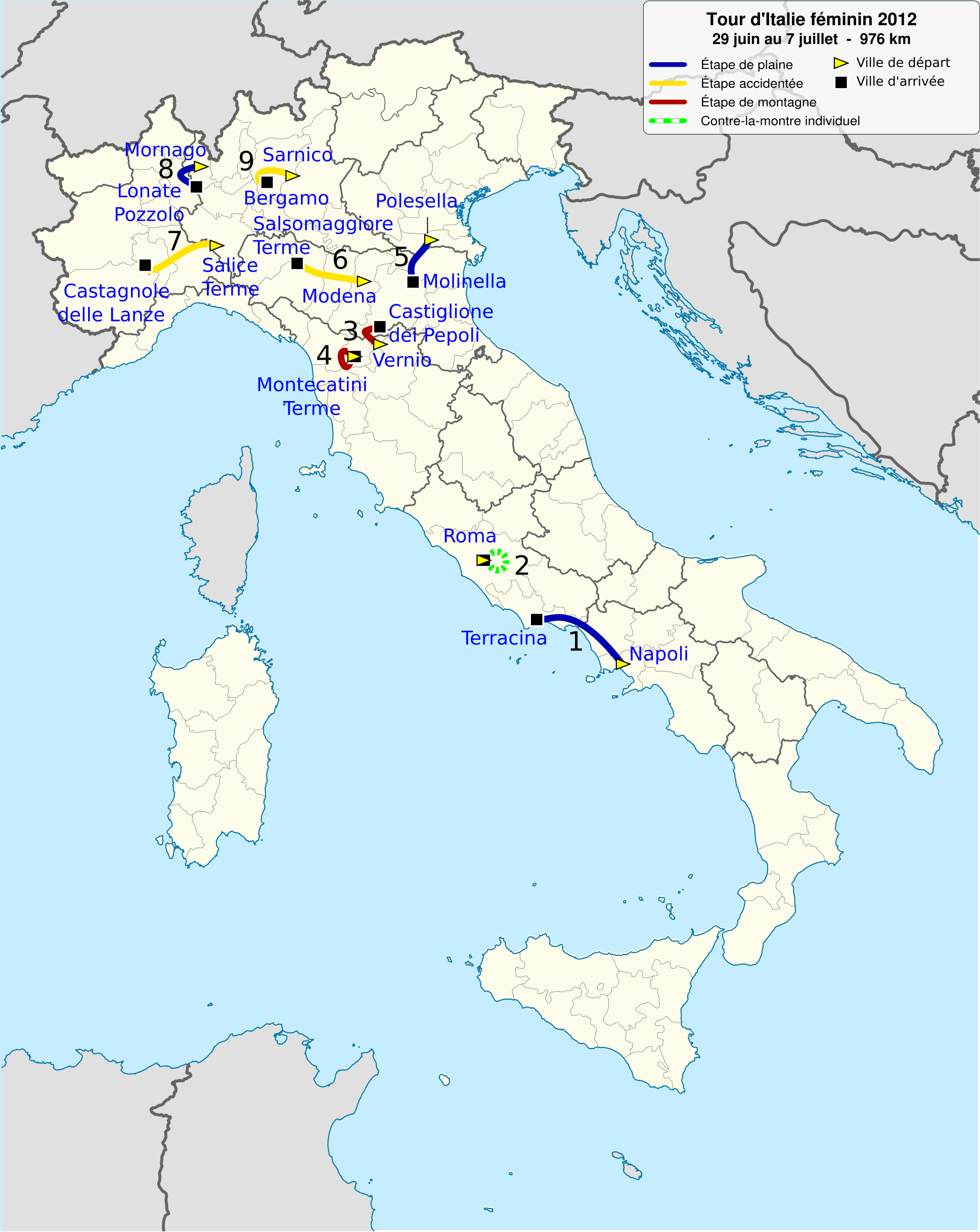

Race details
- Dates: 29 June–7 July 2012
- Stages: 9
- Distance: 961 km (597.1 mi)
- Winning time: 24h 50′ 43″

Results
Jersey awarded to the overall winner	Winner	Marianne Vos (NED)	(Rabobank Women)
	Second	Emma Pooley (GBR)	(AA Drink–leontien.nl)
	Third	Evelyn Stevens (USA)	(Specialized–lululemon)
Jersey awarded to the points classification winner	Points	Marianne Vos (NED)	(Rabobank Women)
Jersey awarded to the mountains classification winner	Mountains	Emma Pooley (GBR)	(AA Drink–leontien.nl)
Jersey awarded to the youth classification winner	Youth	Elisa Longo Borghini (ITA)	(Hitec Products–Mistral Home)

The 2012 Giro d'Italia Femminile, or Giro Donne, was the 23rd running of the Giro d'Italia Femminile, the most prestigious stage race on the women's road cycling calendar. It was held over nine stages from 29 June to 7 July 2012, starting in Naples and finishing in Bergamo. The race was won by last year's winner Marianne Vos, who also won 5 of the 9 stages as well as the yellow jersey (points).

== Teams ==
Seventeen teams competed in the 2012 Giro d'Italia Femminile: the top ten UCI Women's Teams (listed on the left below), a Dutch national team, and six 'wildcard' Italian teams:

- Rabobank Women
- Specialized–lululemon
- AA Drink–leontien.nl
- Orica–AIS
- Hitec Products–Mistral Home
- Diadora–Pasta Zara
- Be Pink
- Faren Honda
- RusVelo
- Lotto Belisol
- Dutch national team
- Giusfredi Verinlegno
- MCipollini–Giambenini
- Vaiano Tepso
- Fassa Bortolo Servetto
- S.C. Michela Fanini Rox
- Forno d'Asolo Colavita

== Stages ==
The 2012 race started with the longest stage, a 139.1 km flat stage from Naples to Terracina. The second stage was a 7.2 km individual time trial around the streets of Rome.

Stage	Date	Course	Distance	Stage winner	Winner's team
1	29 June	Naples to Terracina	139.1 km (86.4 mi)	Marianne Vos (NED)	Rabobank Women
2	30 June	Rome	7.2 km (4.5 mi)	Marianne Vos (NED)	Rabobank Women
3	1 July	Vernio to Castiglione dei Pepoli	124 km (77 mi)	Evelyn Stevens (USA)	Specialized–lululemon
4	2 July	Montecatini Terme to Montecatini Alto	98 km (61 mi)	Marianne Vos (NED)	Rabobank Women
5	3 July	Polesella to Molinella	118.7 km (73.8 mi)	Tiffany Cromwell (AUS)	Orica–AIS
6	4 July	Modena to Salsomaggiore	122.2 km (75.9 mi)	Shelley Olds (USA)	AA Drink–leontien.nl
7	5 July	Voghera to Castagnole delle Lanze	129.1 km (80.2 mi)	Marianne Vos (NED)	Rabobank Women
8	6 July	Mornago to Lonate Pozzolo	116.2 km (72.2 mi)	Marianne Vos (NED)	Rabobank Women
9	7 July	Sarnico to Bergamo	106.9 km (66.4 mi)	Emma Johansson (SWE)	Hitec Products–Mistral Home
Total			961 km (597 mi)		

== Classification ==
There were five different jerseys awarded in the 2012 Giro Donne. These followed the same format as those in the men's Giro d'Italia, and as in the men's race, the leader of the general classification received a pink jersey. This classification was calculated by adding the combined finishing times of the riders from each stage, and the overall winner of this classification is considered the winner of the Giro.

The other jerseys differ in colour from those of the men's Giro:

- The points classification was awarded the maglia gialla or yellow jersey, a change from its mauve (ciclamino) colour in preceding years. Points are awarded for placements at stage finishes as well as at selected intermediate sprint points on the route, and the jersey is received by the rider with the most overall points to their name.
- The mountains classification was awarded the green jersey (maglia verde). Points were allocated for the first few riders over selected mountain passes on the route, with more difficult passes paying more points, and the jersey is received by the rider with the most overall points to their name.
- The white jersey (maglia bianca) for the best young rider was given to the highest-placed rider on the general classification aged 23 or under on 1 January 2012 (i.e. born in or after 1989).
- The blue jersey (maglia azzura) was given to the highest-placed Italian rider on the general classification.

== Classification progress ==
Stage	Winner	General classification	Points classification	Mountains classification	Young rider classification	Italian rider classification
1	Marianne Vos	Marianne Vos	Marianne Vos	Aleksandra Sošenko	Chloe Hosking	Giorgia Bronzini
2	Marianne Vos	Marianne Vos	Marianne Vos	Aleksandra Sošenko	Alena Amialiusik	Tatiana Guderzo
3	Evelyn Stevens	Evelyn Stevens	Marianne Vos	Emma Pooley	Elisa Longo Borghini	Fabiana Luperini
4	Marianne Vos	Marianne Vos	Marianne Vos	Emma Pooley	Elisa Longo Borghini	Fabiana Luperini
5	Tiffany Cromwell	Marianne Vos	Marianne Vos	Emma Pooley	Elisa Longo Borghini	Fabiana Luperini
6	Shelley Olds	Marianne Vos	Marianne Vos	Emma Pooley	Elisa Longo Borghini	Fabiana Luperini
7	Marianne Vos	Marianne Vos	Marianne Vos	Emma Pooley	Elisa Longo Borghini	Fabiana Luperini
8	Marianne Vos	Marianne Vos	Marianne Vos	Emma Pooley	Elisa Longo Borghini	Fabiana Luperini
9	Emma Johansson	Marianne Vos	Marianne Vos	Emma Pooley	Elisa Longo Borghini	Fabiana Luperini
Final		Marianne Vos	Marianne Vos	Emma Pooley	Elisa Longo Borghini	Fabiana Luperini

=== General classification progress ===
Top five with times behind the race leader:

Stage	Leader	2nd		3rd		4th		5th	
1	Marianne Vos (NED)	Shelley Olds (USA)	4"	Giorgia Bronzini (ITA)	6"	Chloe Hosking (AUS)	7"	Marta Tagliaferro (ITA)	8"
2	Marianne Vos (NED)	Clara Hughes (CAN)	15"	Shelley Olds (USA)	19"	Judith Arndt (GER)	22"	Evelyn Stevens (USA)	27"
3	Evelyn Stevens (USA)	Marianne Vos (NED)	12"	Emma Pooley (GBR)	31"	Fabiana Luperini (ITA)	1' 01"	Judith Arndt (GER)	2' 35"
4	Marianne Vos (NED)	Evelyn Stevens (USA)	1' 31"	Emma Pooley (GBR)	2' 07"	Fabiana Luperini (ITA)	2' 37"	Tatiana Guderzo (ITA)	4' 08"
5	Marianne Vos (NED)	Evelyn Stevens (USA)	1' 31"	Emma Pooley (GBR)	2' 07"	Fabiana Luperini (ITA)	2' 37"	Tiffany Cromwell (AUS)	3' 46"
6	Marianne Vos (NED)	Evelyn Stevens (USA)	1' 44"	Emma Pooley (GBR)	2' 20"	Fabiana Luperini (ITA)	2' 57"	Tiffany Cromwell (AUS)	4' 06"
7	Marianne Vos (NED)	Evelyn Stevens (USA)	1' 54"	Emma Pooley (GBR)	2' 30"	Fabiana Luperini (ITA)	3' 03"	Tatiana Guderzo (ITA)	4' 24"
8	Marianne Vos (NED)	Evelyn Stevens (USA)	2' 00"	Emma Pooley (GBR)	3' 20"	Fabiana Luperini (ITA)	3' 53"	Judith Arndt (GER)	4' 45"
9	Marianne Vos (NED)	Emma Pooley (GBR)	3' 27"	Evelyn Stevens (USA)	6' 32"	Fabiana Luperini (ITA)	7' 39"	Emma Johansson (SWE)	7' 50"

== Final standings ==
=== General classification ===
	Rider	Team	Time
1	Marianne Vos (NED)	Rabobank Women	24h 50′ 43″
2	Emma Pooley (GBR)	AA Drink–leontien.nl	+ 3' 27"
3	Evelyn Stevens (USA)	Specialized–lululemon	+ 6' 32"
4	Fabiana Luperini (ITA)	Faren Honda	+ 7' 39"
5	Emma Johansson (SWE)	Hitec Products–Mistral Home	+ 7' 50"
6	Judith Arndt (GER)	Orica–AIS	+ 8' 30"
7	Tatiana Guderzo (ITA)	MCipollini–Giambenini	+ 9' 00"
8	Claudia Häusler (GER)	Orica–AIS	+ 9' 13"
9	Elisa Longo Borghini (ITA)	Hitec Products–Mistral Home	+ 10' 07"
10	Ashleigh Moolman (RSA)	Lotto Belisol Ladies	+ 10' 12"

=== Points classification ===
	Rider	Team	Points
1	Marianne Vos (NED)	Rabobank Women	107
2	Emma Johansson (SWE)	Hitec Products–Mistral Home	52
3	Judith Arndt (GER)	Orica–AIS	48
4	Evelyn Stevens (USA)	Specialized–lululemon	47
5	Shelley Olds (USA)	AA Drink–leontien.nl	43

=== Mountains classification ===
	Rider	Team	Points
1	Emma Pooley (GBR)	AA Drink–leontien.nl	43
2	Evelyn Stevens (USA)	Specialized–lululemon	21
3	Marianne Vos (NED)	Rabobank Women	16
4	Linda Villumsen (NZL)	Orica–AIS	12
5	Claudia Häusler (GER)	Orica–AIS	10
5	Fabiana Luperini (ITA)	Faren Honda	10

=== Young riders classification ===
	Rider	Team	Time
1	Elisa Longo Borghini (ITA)	Hitec Products–Mistral Home	25h 00′ 50″
2	Alena Amialiusik (BLR)	Be Pink	+ 5' 11"
3	Rossella Ratto (ITA)	Verinlegno-Fabiani	+ 13' 12"
4	Lucinda Brand (NED)	AA Drink–leontien.nl	+ 28' 42"
5	Anna Van Der Breggen (NED)	Dutch national team	+30' 10"
