= Ana Belen Garcia Antequera =

Spanish cyclist

Ana Belen Garcia
Personal information
- Full name: Ana Belen Garcia Antequera
- Born: 30 January 1981 (age 45) Spain

Cycling career
- Sport: Cycling
- Discipline: Road cycling

Professional teams
- 2007: Comunidad Valenciana
- 2008–2011: Bizkaia – Durango

Ana Belen Garcia Antequera (born 30 January 1981) is a road cyclist from Spain. She represented her nation at the 2006, 2009 and 2010 UCI Road World Championships.
