= Ruth Corset =

Australian cyclist

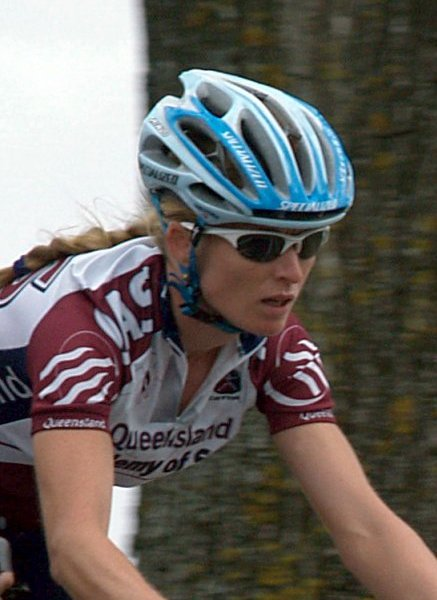

Personal information
- Full name: Ruth Corset
- Born: 9 May 1977 (age 49) Wewak, Papua New Guinea

Cycling career
- Sport: Cycling
- Current team: Retired
- Discipline: Road
- Role: Rider
- Rider type: Climbing specialist

Professional teams
- 2008–2009: Jazz Apple Women's Cycling Team
- 2010: Team TIBCO–To The Top
- 2011–2013: Bizkaia–Durango
- 2014: Holden Women's Cycling Team
- 2015–2017: Total Rush Hyster

Ruth Corset (born 9 May 1977) is an Australian racing cyclist. She originally took up cycling in 2006 after previously competing in triathlon. She won the Australian National Road Race Championships in 2010 and was second in 2009 and 2016.

== Major results ==
2008
6th Overall Women's Tour of New Zealand
2009
1st Stage 6 La Route de France
Oceania Road Championships

2nd Road race
10th Time trial

2nd Road race, National Road Championships
2nd Overall Tour Féminin en Limousin
4th Overall Women's Tour of New Zealand
4th Coupe du Monde Cycliste Féminine de Montréal
5th GP de Plouay – Bretagne
7th Liberty Classic
2010
1st Road race, National Road Championships
2nd Overall Tour Féminin en Limousin
3rd Overall Tour Cycliste Féminin International de l'Ardèche

1st Stage 2 (ITT)

4th Overall Women's Tour of New Zealand
4th Trofeo Alfredo Binda-Comune di Cittiglio
7th Liberty Classic
2011
3rd Time trial, National Road Championships
3rd Overall Women's Tour of New Zealand
5th Time trial, Oceania Road Championships
6th Overall Giro d'Italia Femminile
2013
Oceania Road Championships

3rd Time trial
4th Road race

2015
7th Cadel Evans Great Ocean Road Race
2016
2nd Road race, National Road Championships
5th Road race, Oceania Road Championships
8th Cadel Evans Great Ocean Road Race
2023
1st Hill Climb Championship (QOM) Road race, National Road Championships
