= Frøydis Meen Wærsted =

Norwegian cyclist

Frøydis Wærsted
Personal information
- Full name: Frøydis Meen Wærsted
- Born: 15 June 1987 (age 39) Norway

Cycling career
- Sport: Cycling
- Discipline: Road cycling
- Role: Rider

Professional team
- 2010–2012: Hitec Products–Mistral Home

Frøydis Meen Wærsted (born 15 June 1987) is a Norwegian former road cyclist.

She represented her nation at the 2009 UCI Road World Championships and 2010 UCI Road World Championships. She became national champion at the Norwegian National Road Race Championship in 2011. She competed in the main international women's competitions including the La Flèche Wallonne Féminine, Tour of Flanders and Omloop Het Nieuwsblad and had a podium finish in a stage at the Tour Cycliste Féminin International de l'Ardèche in 2010.
