= GP Stad Roeselare =

Women's bicycle race

Race details
- Date: End of April
- Region: Roeselare, Belgium
- Discipline: Road

History
- First edition: 2007
- Editions: 6
- Final edition: 2012
- First winner: Martine Bras (NED)
- Final winner: Annemiek van Vleuten (NED)

The GP Stad Roeselare was an elite women's road bicycle race held annually in Roeselare, Belgium. The race was established in 2007 and was rated by the UCI as a 1.1 category race.

== Past winners ==
Year	Country	Rider	Team
2007	Netherlands	Martine Bras	
2008	Netherlands	Loes Markerink	
2009	Netherlands	Kirsten Wild	
2010	Netherlands	Kirsten Wild	Cervelo Test Team
2011	United States	Amber Neben	
2012	Netherlands	Annemiek van Vleuten	Rabobank Women Cycling Team
