= Salcano (company) =

Turkish bicycle manufacturer

- Formerly: Salko Bicycle
- Company type: Public
- Industry: Bicycle manufacturing
- Founded: 1975
- Headquarters: Istanbul, Turkey
- Key people: Salih Hadzifejzovic Akgül (President)
- Products: Bicycles and related components
- Website: www.salcano.com

Salcano is a Turkish bicycle manufacturer based in Istanbul. It was founded in 1975 as a family company under the name Salko Bicycle.

The company produces a variety of bicycles including road bikes, mountain bikes, hybrid bikes, city bikes (aka utility bikes), and children bikes.

The company's 16,000 m² factory in Istanbul produces bicycles and also manufactures other parts such as wheels and tires; the company currently produces 225,000 parts annually.

In January 2021, the company broke ground on a new factory in Lüleburgaz, expanding its manufacturing area to 40,000 m² in total and expanding production capacity to 500,000 bicycles per year.

In 2011, the company sponsored a Union Cycliste Internationale (UCI) Mountain bike racing team known as ANKARAGUCU - SALCANO.
