= Veronica Marcela Gerez =

Argentine cyclist

Personal information
- Born: Argentina

Cycling career
- Sport: Cycling
- Discipline: Road cycling

Veronica Marcela Gerez is a road cyclist from Argentina. She represented her nation at the 2009 UCI Road World Championships.
