= Grace Verbeke =

Belgian cyclist

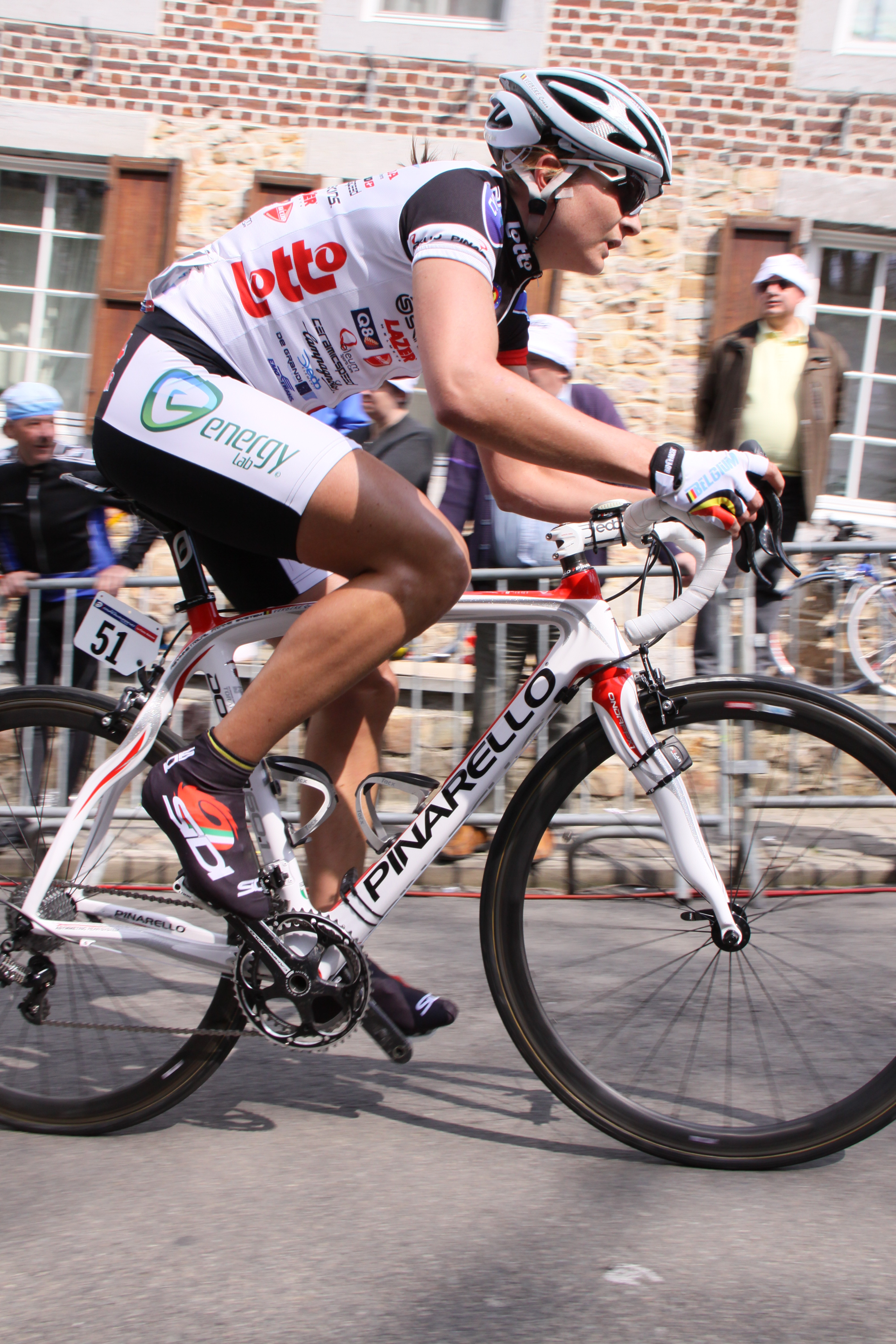
- Grace Verbeke.

Personal information
- Born: 12 November 1984 (age 41) Belgium

Cycling career
- Sport: Cycling
- Discipline: Road cycling

Professional teams
- 2014: Futurumshop.nl–Zannata
- 2013: CyclelivePLUS-Zannata Ladies Team

Major wins
- Women's World Cup Tour of Flanders (2010) Stage races Tour Féminin en Limousin (2009) One day Races & Classics National Time Trial Champion (2010)

Grace Verbeke (born 12 November 1984) is a former road cyclist from Belgium. She participated at the 2007, 2008, 2009, 2010 and 2011 UCI Road World Championships.

== Major results ==
2009
1st Overall Tour Féminin en Limousin

1st Stage 1

2nd Overall Tour Cycliste Féminin International Ardèche
2nd Grand Prix Elsy Jacobs
3rd Chrono Champenois – Trophée Européen

2010
1st National Time Trial Championships
1st Tour of Flanders
1st Parkhotel Rooding Hills Classic
3rd Omloop Het Nieuwsblad

2011
1st Finale Lotto Cycling Cup – Breendonk
1st Dwars Door De Westhoek
2nd National Time Trial Championships
2nd Trofeo Costa Etrusca Iii
3rd Overall Tour Féminin en Limousin
