= Tour Féminin en Limousin =

Race details
- Date: July
- Region: France
- Discipline: Road

History
- First edition: 2005
- Editions: 9 (as of 2013)
- First winner: Edwige Pitel (FRA)
- Most recent: Katarzyna Pawłowska (POL)

The Tour Féminin en Limousin is an elite women's road bicycle stage race held in France. The race was established in 2005 and is rated by the UCI as a 2.2 category race.

== Past winners ==
Year	Country	Rider	Team
2005	France	Edwige Pitel	
2006	Netherlands	Marianne Vos	
2007	Russia	Svetlana Boubnenkova	
2008	Russia	Natalia Boyarskaya	
2009	Belgium	Grace Verbeke	
2010	Estonia	Grete Treier	
2011	Estonia	Grete Treier	
2012	Netherlands	Marianne Vos	
2013	Poland	Katarzyna Pawłowska	
