= Alyona Andruk =

Ukrainian road bicycle racer

Alona Anatoliïvna Andruk (Ukrainian: Альона Андрук; born 11 June 1987) is a Ukrainian road bicycle racer, entrepreneur and businesswoman. She competed at the 2012 Summer Olympics in the Women's road race, but finished over the time limit.

In 2014 she founded Take Off Ltd.
