= Ludivine Henrion =

Belgian cyclist

Medal record

Women's road cycling

Representing Belgium

World University Cycling Championship
Bronze medal – third place	2006 Antwerp	Road race

Ludivine Henrion (born 23 January 1984, in Namur) is a Belgian road bicycle racer. She won the bronze medal at the 2006 World University Cycling Championship in the road race behind Ellen van Dijk and Eva Lutz. She competed at the 2012 Summer Olympics in the Women's road race, but finished over the time limit.

== Teams ==
2004 Bik-Gios (The Netherlands)
2005 Therme Skin Care (The Netherlands)
2006 Lotto–Belisol Ladiesteam (Belgium) (2006 Lotto–Belisol Ladiesteam season)
2007 DSB Bank (The Netherlands)
2008 AA Drink Cycling Team (The Netherlands) (2008 AA-Drink Cycling Team season)
2009 RedSun Cycling Team (The Netherlands)
2010 Redsun Cycling Team (Belgium)
2011 Lotto–Honda Team (Belgium)
2012 Lotto–Belisol Ladies (Belgium)

== Major results ==
2006
7th Omloop Het Volk

2009
9th Omloop Het Nieuwsblad
