= Martine Bras =

Dutch cyclist (born 1978)

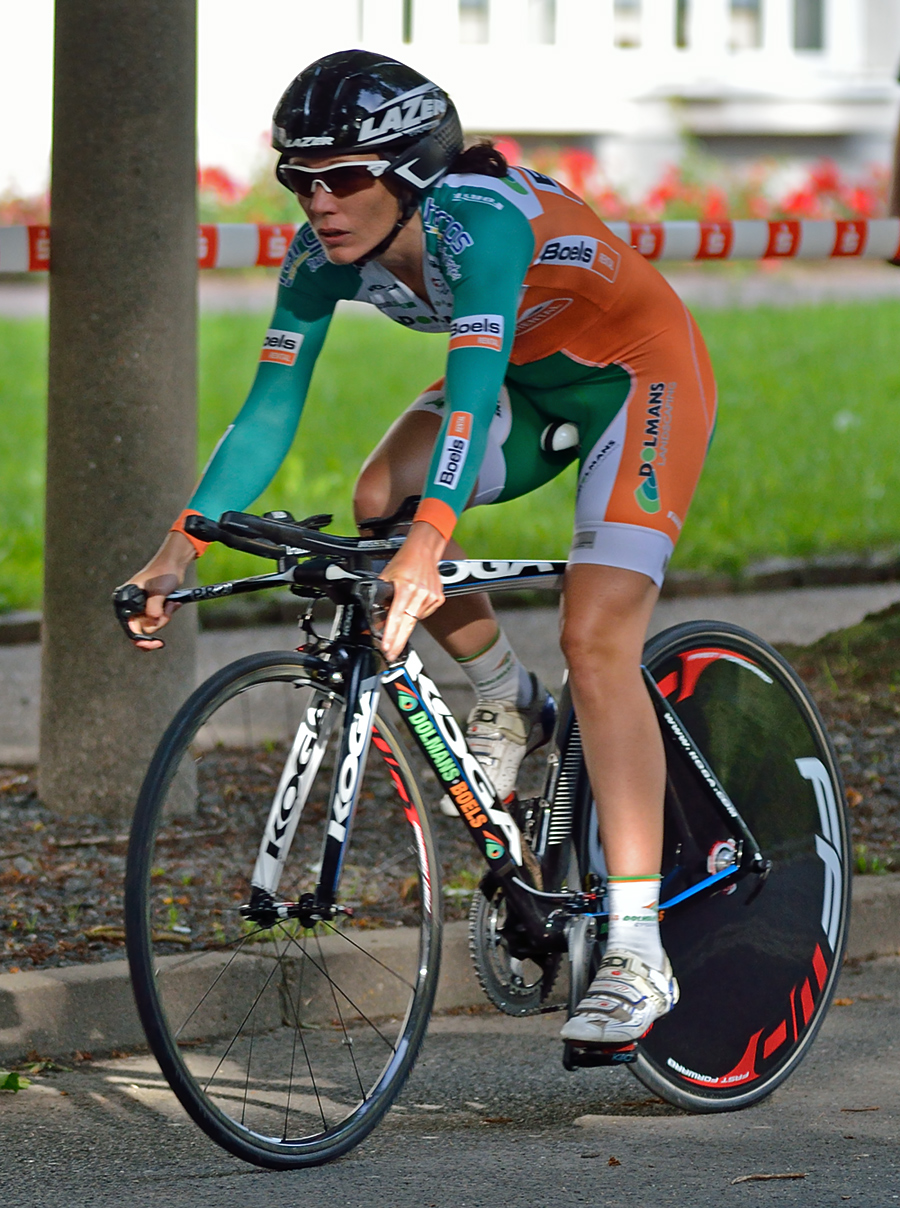

Personal information
- Born: 17 May 1978 (age 48) Schoonrewoerd, Netherlands

Cycling career
- Sport: Cycling
- Discipline: Road cycling

Professional teams
- 1998–1999: The Greeneries
- 2000: Toscany-Ahoy
- 2002–2003: Ondernemers van Nature
- 2006: Moving Ladies
- 2007: Lotto–Belisol Ladiesteam
- 2008: Vrienden van het Platteland
- 2009: Menikini-Selle Italia-Master Colors
- 2010: Gauss RDZ Ormu
- 2011–2013: Boels–Dolmans Cycling Team

Martine Bras (born 17 May 1978) is a Dutch former road cyclist turned cycling coach and occasional commentator, who lives in Belgium since 2012.

== Cyclist career ==
Martine Bras joined the Jan van Riebeeck cycling club at the age of 9. At the age of 10, she became the Dutch national youth champion in Category 3. Bras came in sixth at the World Championships road cycling in Slovenia. She turned professional in 1998. Bras won bronze in the national cycling championship of the Netherlands of 2003. In 2003, she retired from professional cycling because of a disease.

In 2006, Bras returned to professional cycling. In 2007 she was the winner of the first Grand Prix of Roeselare, in 2007 and 2010 she won stages at the Holland Ladies Tours, in 2008 she won the Grand Prix of Geel, in 2010 she was runner-up in the Trofeo Alfredo Binda-Comune di Cittiglio (behind compatriot Marianne Vos), and in 2011 she won the Halle-Buizingen race. Over these years, Bras participated three times in the UCI Road World Championships (2009, 2011, and 2012). At Boels–Dolmans Cycling Team she was a lead cyclist.

In August 2013, Bras was forced back into retirement, this time due to injuries sustained from falling several times.

== Major results ==
2006
10th Omloop Het Volk

2008
4th Omloop Het Volk

2010
6th Omloop Het Nieuwsblad
