= Red Sun Cycling Team =

Team information
- UCI code: RSC
- Registered: Netherlands
- Founded: 2009
- Disbanded: 2010
- Discipline: Road
- Status: UCI Women's Team
- Bicycles: Ridley

Key personnel
- General manager: Jan Van Doorn

Team name history
- 2009–2010: Red Sun Cycling Team

Red Sun Cycling Team (UCI Code: RSC) was a women's professional cycling team based in Netherlands, sponsored by Red Sun Gardening Products. The team registered as a UCI trade team for the first time in 2009, but disbanded the following year. Riders for Team RSC competed in the UCI Women's Road World Cup and other élite women's events throughout the world.

== Team roster ==
2009

- (Netherlands) Anne Arnouts
- (Belgium) Latoya Brulee
- (Poland) Paulina Brzeźna
- (Netherlands) Petra Dijkman
- (Belgium) Maxime Groenewegen
- (Netherlands) Elise van Hage
- (Belgium) Ludivine Henrion
- (Sweden) Emma Johansson
- (Netherlands) Inge Klep
- (Netherlands) Daniëlla Moonen
- (Netherlands) Mascha Pijnenborg
- (Netherlands) Moniek Rotmensen
- (Belgium) Laure Werner

== Major wins ==
2009
Roux Miroir, Ludivine Henrion
Oostduinkerke, Emma Johansson
Ronde van Drenthe, Emma Johansson
Rijsoord, Latoya Brulee
Heusden-Zolder Chrono, Latoya Brulee
Stage 5 Thüringen Rundfahrt der Frauen, Emma Johansson
Stage 6 Holland Ladies Tour, Emma Johansson
2010
Omloop Het Nieuwsblad, Emma Johansson
Provincial Road Race Championship Oost-Vlaanderen, Latoya Brulee
Provincial Time Trial Championship Vlaams-Brabant, Laure Werner
Mamer, Emma Johansson
Stage 1 Thüringen Rundfahrt der Frauen, Emma Johansson
Overall Trophée d'Or Féminin, Emma Johansson

Stage 4 Trophée d'Or Féminin, Emma Johansson

== National champions ==
2009
Belgian National Road Race Championships, Ludivine Henrion
