= 2010 UCI Road World Championships =

Cycling world championships

- Venue: Geelong and Melbourne, Australia
- Date: 29 September – 3 October 2010
- Nations participating: 49
- Cyclists participating: 444
- Events: 6

The 2010 UCI Road World Championships took place in Geelong and Melbourne, Australia, over 5 days from 29 September to 3 October 2010. It was the 83rd UCI Road World Championships and the first time that Australia had held the event. Coincidentally, the title's defender at the road race was an Australian, Cadel Evans, who has a home in Barwon Heads, only 20 km from Geelong.

The time trial and most of the road race elements of the 2010 UCI Road World Championships were staged in Geelong, while the final event, the men's road race, started in Melbourne and went to Geelong, where it finished after 11 laps of the road-race circuit.

The events were spread over five days, allowing recovery time for those riders wishing to take part in both the time trial and the road race. The first event, the men's under-23 time trial resulted in a win for Taylor Phinney, who went on to share third place in the U-23 road race, which was won from a group sprint by Michael Matthews of Australia. In the women's events, Olympic silver medallist Emma Pooley became the first British rider to win the time trial, and Giorgia Bronzini, bronze medallist in the 2007 championships, won from a three rider chase group.

Switzerland's Fabian Cancellara successfully defended his men's time trial title, achieving a record fourth win: and in the final, showpiece event, Thor Hushovd became the first Norwegian winner, and a bronze for Allan Davis clinched top place in the medal table for the hosts.

== Competition schedule ==
All times are local (UTC+10).

Location of Victoria, Australia

Host cities in Victoria

Event date	Starting time	Event details
29 September	10:00	Under 23 Men Time trial (31.8 km)
29 September	15:00	Elite Women Time trial (22.9 km)
30 September	13:00	Elite Men Time trial (45.8 km)
1 October	13:00	Under 23 Men Road race (159 km)
2 October	13:00	Elite Women Road race (127.2 km)
3 October	10:00	Elite Men Road race (262.7 km)

== Participating nations ==
444 cyclists from 49 national federations participated. The number of cyclists per nation that competed is shown in parentheses.

Participating national federations
Click on a nation to go to the nations' UCI Road World Championships page
- Andorra (1)
- Argentina (7)
- Australia (24) (host)
- Austria (7)
- Belarus (6)
- Belgium (21)
- Brazil (2)
- Canada (13)
- Chile (1)
- Colombia (6)
- Croatia (4)
- Czech Republic (4)
- Denmark (10)
- Eritrea (1)
- Estonia (4)
- France (18)
- Germany (20)
- Great Britain (14)
- Hong Kong (4)
- Ireland (3)
- Italy (24)
- Japan (7)
- Kazakhstan (11)
- Latvia (1)
- Lithuania (10)
- Luxembourg (6)
- Malaysia (3)
- Mexico (4)
- Morocco (6)
- Netherlands (24)
- New Zealand (15)
- Norway (10)
- Poland (12)
- Portugal (9)
- Russia (21)
- Saint Kitts and Nevis (3)
- Serbia (3)
- Singapore (3)
- Slovakia (4)
- Slovenia (14)
- South Africa (8)
- Spain (17)
- Sweden (8)
- Switzerland (14)
- Thailand (2)
- Turkey (1)
- Ukraine (9)
- United States (22)
- Venezuela (3)

== Events summary ==
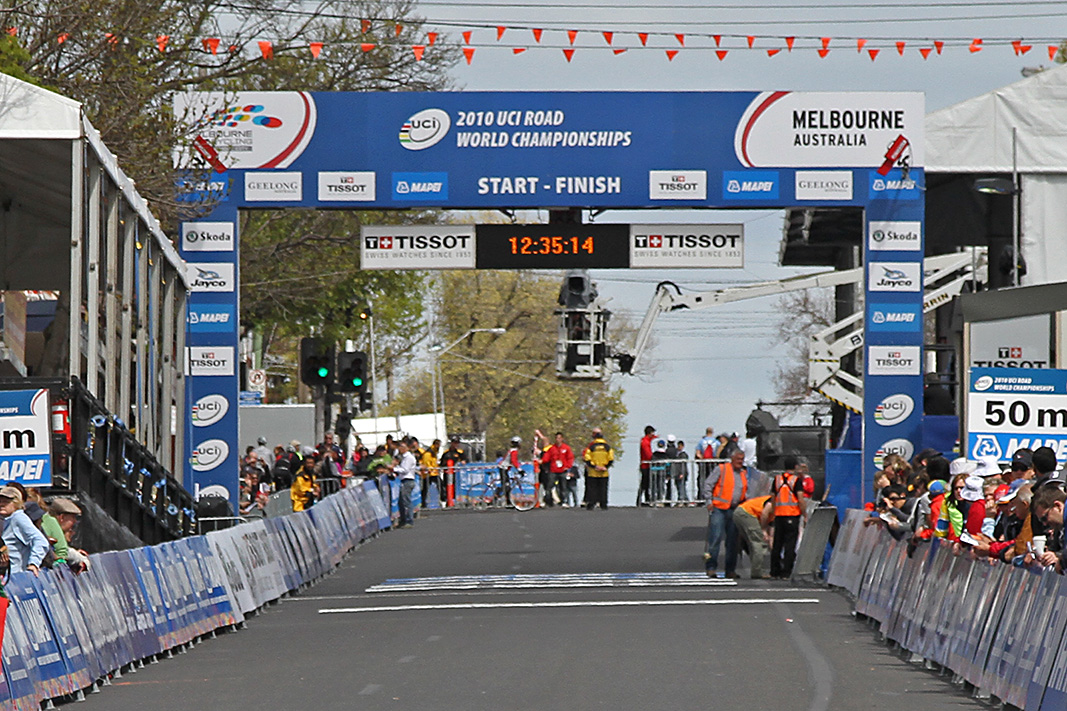

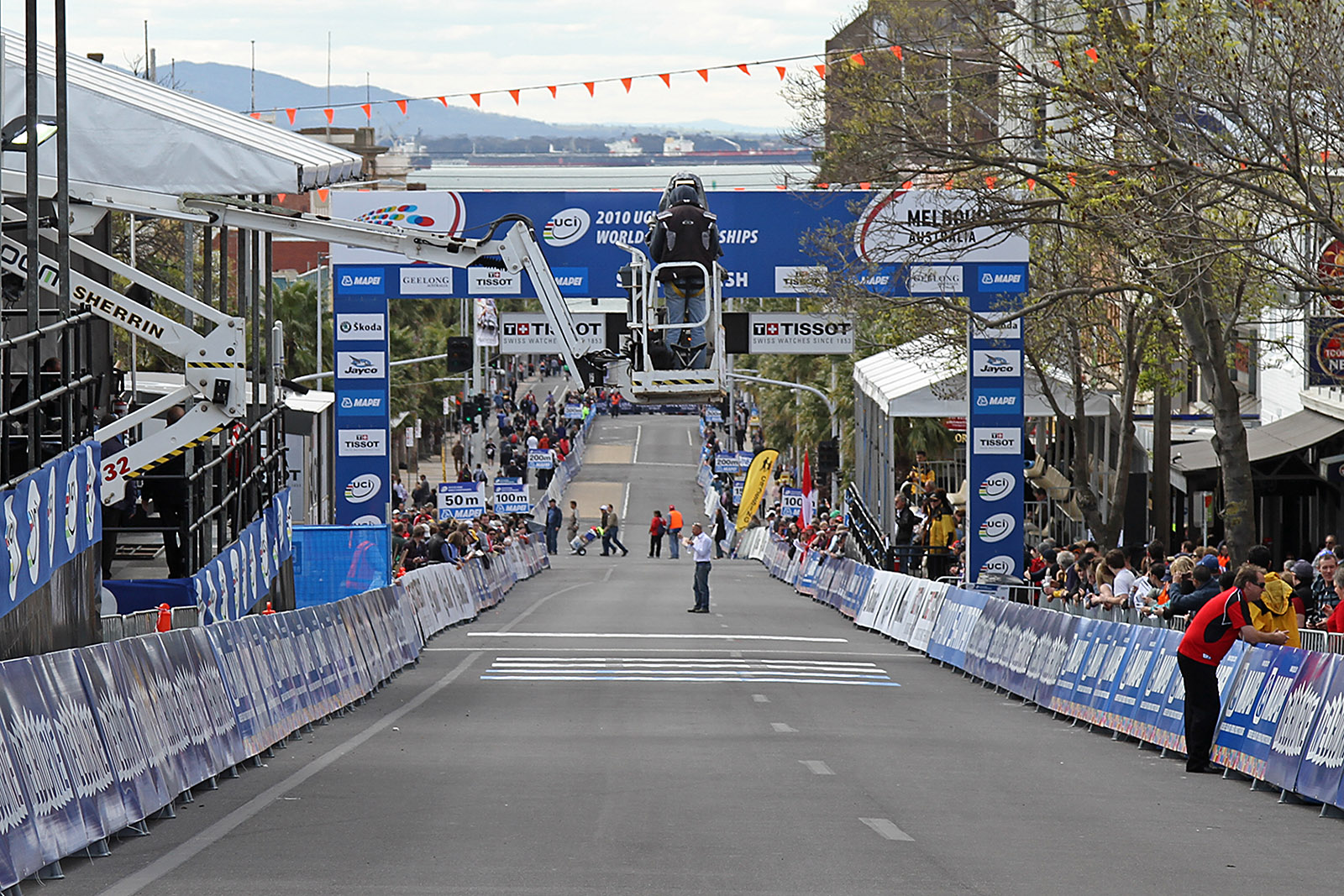
View down the start-finish straight, showing the final incline with which riders had to contend

Event	Gold		Silver		Bronze	
Men's Events
Road race	Thor Hushovd; Norway	6h 21' 49"	Matti Breschel; Denmark	s.t.	Allan Davis; Australia	s.t.
Time trial	Fabian Cancellara; Switzerland	58' 09.19"	David Millar; Great Britain	+ 1' 02.75"	Tony Martin; Germany	+ 1' 12.49"
Women's Events
Road race	Giorgia Bronzini; Italy	3h 32' 01"	Marianne Vos; Netherlands	s.t.	Emma Johansson; Sweden	s.t.
Time trial	Emma Pooley; Great Britain	32' 48.44"	Judith Arndt; Germany	+ 15.17"	Linda Villumsen; New Zealand	+ 15.80"
Men's Under-23 Events
Road race	Michael Matthews; Australia	4h 01' 23"	John Degenkolb; Germany	s.t.	Taylor Phinney; United States; Guillaume Boivin; Canada (Dead heat)	s.t.
Time trial	Taylor Phinney; United States	42' 50.29"	Luke Durbridge; Australia	+ 1.90"	Marcel Kittel; Germany	+ 24.01"

== Medal table ==
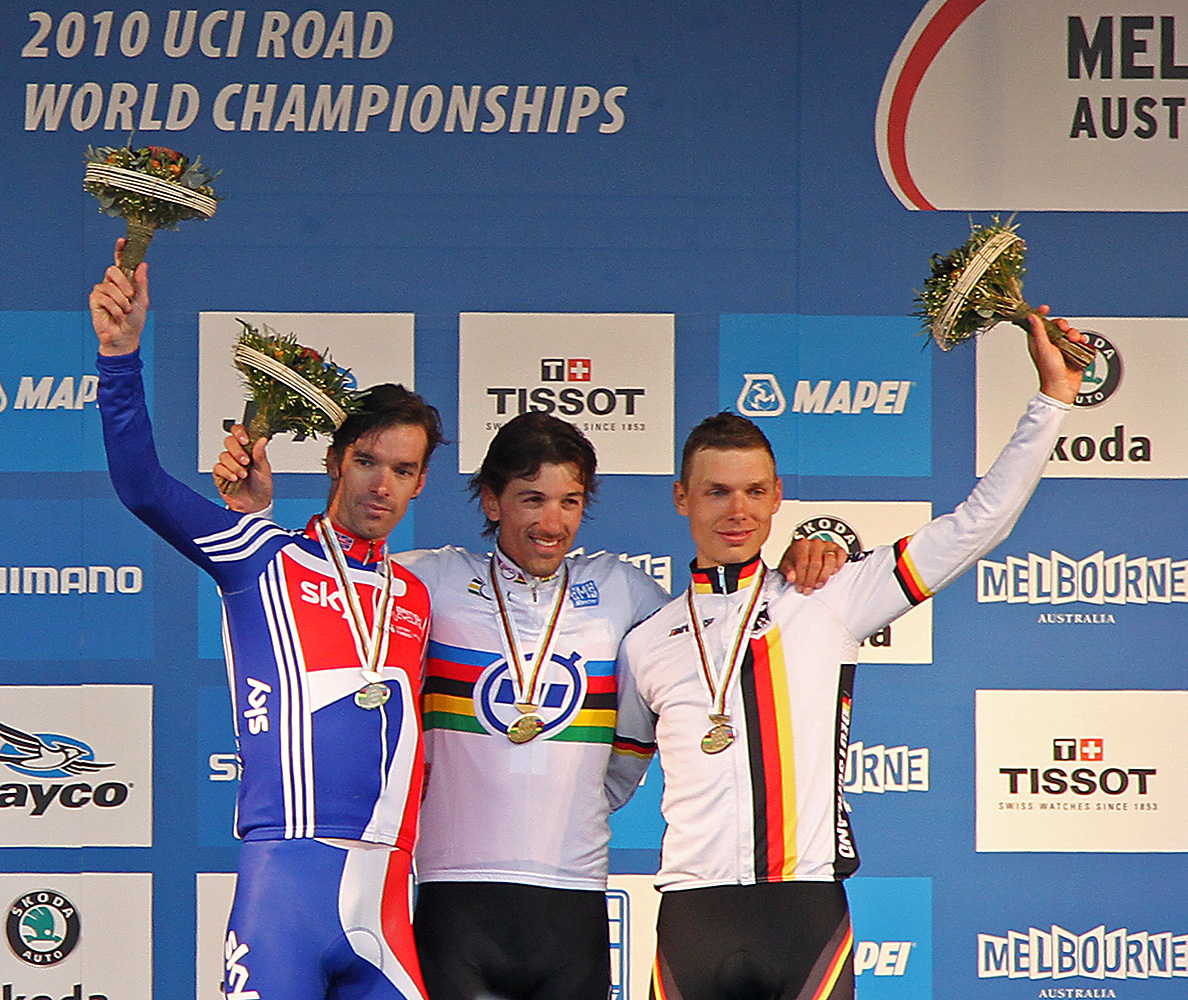
Elite Men's Time trial medallists: David Millar, Fabian Cancellara, & Tony Martin

Place	Nation	1st place, gold medalist(s)	2nd place, silver medalist(s)	3rd place, bronze medalist(s)	Total
1	Australia	1	1	1	3
2	Great Britain	1	1	0	2
3	United States	1	0	1	2
4	Italy	1	0	0	1
4	Norway	1	0	0	1
4	Switzerland	1	0	0	1
7	Germany	0	2	2	4
8	Denmark	0	1	0	1
8	Netherlands	0	1	0	1
10	Canada	0	0	1	1
10	New Zealand	0	0	1	1
10	Sweden	0	0	1	1
Total		6	6	7	19
