= 2013 Thüringen Rundfahrt der Frauen =

- Logo

Race details
- Dates: 15–21 July 2013
- Stages: 7
- Distance: 612.9 km (380.8 mi)
- Winning time: 17h 07' 57"

Results
Jersey awarded to the overall winner	Winner	Emma Johansson (SWE)	(Orica–AIS)
	Second	Shara Gillow (AUS)	(Orica–AIS)
	Third	Lisa Brennauer (GER)	(Specialized–lululemon)
Jersey awarded to the points classification winner	Points	Emma Johansson (SWE)	(Orica–AIS)
Jersey awarded to the mountains classification winner	Mountains	Christine Majerus (LUX)	(Sengers Ladies Cycling Team)
Jersey awarded to the young rider classification winner	Young rider	Anna van der Breggen (NED)	(Sengers Ladies Cycling Team)
	Team	Orica–AIS	

The 2013 Thüringen Rundfahrt der Frauen was the 26th edition of the Thüringen Rundfahrt der Frauen, a women's cycling stage race in Germany. It is rated by the UCI as a category 2.1 race and was held between 15 and 21 July 2013.

== Stages ==
=== Stage 1 ===
15 July 2013 – Schleusingen to Schleusingen, 64.0 km (39.8 mi)

Linda Villumsen rode away from the bunch in the final 15 km (9.3 mi), got a 35-second lead but was pulled back by the pack 500m from the finish. Emma Johansson won the uphill finale ahead of Lizzie Armitstead and Annemiek van Vleuten. With the bonification seconds earned during sprints, Johansson had a six-second lead on Van Vleuten and a nine-second lead on Armitstead.

Stage 1 result

	Rider	Team	Time
1	Emma Johansson (SWE)	Orica–AIS	1h 43' 28"
2	Lizzie Armitstead (GBR)	Boels–Dolmans Cycling Team	s.t.
3	Annemiek van Vleuten (NED)	Rabobank-Liv Giant	s.t.
4	Ellen van Dijk (NED)	Specialized–lululemon	s.t.
5	Alena Amialiusik (BLR)	Be Pink	+ 2"

General Classification after Stage 1

	Rider	Team	Time
1	Emma Johansson (SWE)	Orica–AIS	1h 43' 13"
2	Annemiek van Vleuten (NED)	Rabobank-Liv Giant	+ 6"
3	Lizzie Armitstead (GBR)	Boels–Dolmans Cycling Team	+ 9"
4	Ellen van Dijk (NED)	Specialized–lululemon	+ 15"
5	Alena Amialiusik (BLR)	Be Pink	+ 17"

=== Stage 2 ===
16 July 2013 – Hermsdorf to Hermsdorf, 121.4 km (75.4 mi)

Chloe McConville and Anna-Bianca Schnitzmeier rode away together during the stage and built up a 3' 35" lead. After a 40 km breakaway they were caught by the pack with 10 km to go. In the final kilometres there was a crash and Dutch national time trialist Ellen van Dijk, one of the favourites for the ovarall classification, lost 55 seconds. The race ended in a bunch sprint won by Specialized–lululemon rider Carmen Small. With earning time bonuses during sprints, Emma Johansson extended her lead in the general classification.

Stage 2 result

	Rider	Team	Time
1	Carmen Small (USA)	Specialized–lululemon	3h 18' 50"
2	Marta Tagliaferro (ITA)	MCipollini–Giordana	s.t.
3	Emma Johansson (SWE)	Orica–AIS	s.t.
4	Annemiek van Vleuten (NED)	Rabobank-Liv Giant	s.t.
5	Christine Majerus (LUX)	Sengers Ladies Cycling Team	s.t.

General Classification after Stage 2

	Rider	Team	Time
1	Emma Johansson (SWE)	Orica–AIS	5h 01' 56"
2	Annemiek van Vleuten (NED)	Rabobank-Liv Giant	+ 10"
3	Lizzie Armitstead (GBR)	Boels–Dolmans Cycling Team	+ 16"
4	Alena Amialiusik (BLR)	Be Pink	+ 24"
5	Anna van der Breggen (NED)	Sengers Ladies Cycling Team	+ 24"

=== Stage 3 ===
17 July 2013, – Schleiz to Schleiz, 120.5 km (74.9 mi)

In the first part of the stage every breakaway was pulled back by the pack. On the first climb Andrea Braus escaped and built up a seven-minute lead. With 12 km (7.5 mi) to go however, she was pulled back by a 24-rider leading group but earned the most active rider's jersey and moved up to second place in the mountain classification.

Stage 3 result

	Rider	Team	Time
1	Annemiek van Vleuten (NED)	Rabobank-Liv Giant	3h 31' 35"
2	Emma Johansson (SWE)	Orica–AIS	s.t.
3	Valentina Scandolara (ITA)	MCipollini–Giordana	s.t.
4	Elke Gebhardt (GER)	Germany National Team	s.t.
5	Roxane Knetemann (NED)	Rabobank-Liv Giant	s.t.

General Classification after Stage 3

	Rider	Team	Time
1	Emma Johansson (SWE)	Orica–AIS	8h 33' 19"
2	Annemiek van Vleuten (NED)	Rabobank-Liv Giant	+ 11"
3	Lizzie Armitstead (GBR)	Boels–Dolmans Cycling Team	+ 28"
4	Anna van der Breggen (NED)	Sengers Ladies Cycling Team	+ 36"
5	Charlotte Becker (GER)	Wiggle–Honda	+ 36"

=== Stage 4 ===
18 July 2013 – Gera to Gera (individual time trial), 21.0 km (13.0 mi)

Stage 4 result

	Rider	Team	Time
1	Shara Gillow (AUS)	Orica–AIS	28' 52"
2	Ellen van Dijk (NED)	Specialized–lululemon	+ 35"
3	Emma Johansson (SWE)	Orica–AIS	+ 39"
4	Tatiana Guderzo (ITA)	MCipollini–Giordana	+ 50"
5	Lisa Brennauer (GER)	Specialized–lululemon	+ 59"

General Classification after Stage 4

	Rider	Team	Time
1	Emma Johansson (SWE)	Orica–AIS	9h 02' 50"
2	Shara Gillow (AUS)	Orica–AIS	+ 5"
3	Tatiana Guderzo (ITA)	MCipollini–Giordana	+ 47"
4	Lisa Brennauer (GER)	Specialized–lululemon	+ 1' 11"
5	Linda Villumsen (NZL)	Wiggle–Honda	+ 1' 16"

=== Stage 5 ===
19 July 2013 – Altenburg to Altenburg, 100 km (62.1 mi)

Stage 5 result

	Rider	Team	Time
1	Emma Johansson (SWE)	Orica–AIS	2h 28' 01"
2	Lucinda Brand (NED)	Rabobank-Liv Giant	s.t.
3	Valentina Scandolara (ITA)	MCipollini–Giordana	s.t.
4	Amy Cure (AUS)	Australia National Team	+ 3"
5	Anna van der Breggen (NED)	Sengers Ladies Cycling Team	+ 5"

General Classification after Stage 5

	Rider	Team	Time
1	Emma Johansson (SWE)	Orica–AIS	11h 30' 35"
2	Shara Gillow (AUS)	Orica–AIS	+ 30"
3	Lisa Brennauer (GER)	Specialized–lululemon	+ 1' 34"
4	Linda Villumsen (NZL)	Wiggle–Honda	+ 1' 34"
5	Anna van der Breggen (NED)	Sengers Ladies Cycling Team	+ 1' 34"

=== Stage 6 ===
20 July 2013 – Schmölln to Schmölln, 86 km (53.4 mi)

Stage 6 result

	Rider	Team	Time
1	Valentina Scandolara (ITA)	MCipollini–Giordana	2h 45' 45"
2	Lucinda Brand (NED)	Rabobank-Liv Giant	+ 10"
3	Adrie Visser (NED)	Boels–Dolmans Cycling Team	+ 10"
4	Elke Gebhardt (GER)	Germany National Team	+ 10"
5	Emily Collins (AUS)	Wiggle–Honda	+ 10"

General Classification after Stage 6

	Rider	Team	Time
1	Emma Johansson (SWE)	Orica–AIS	14h 16' 28"
2	Shara Gillow (AUS)	Orica–AIS	+ 32"
3	Lisa Brennauer (GER)	Specialized–lululemon	+ 1' 31"
4	Anna van der Breggen (NED)	Sengers Ladies Cycling Team	+ 1' 35"
5	Linda Villumsen (NZL)	Wiggle–Honda	+ 1' 36"

=== Stage 7 ===
21 July 2013 – Zeulenroda-Triebes to Zeulenroda-Triebes, 100 km (62.1 mi)

Stage 7 result

	Rider	Team	Time
1	Tatiana Guderzo (ITA)	MCipollini–Giordana	2h 51' 11"
2	Lisa Brennauer (GER)	Specialized–lululemon	+ 18"
3	Anna van der Breggen (NED)	Sengers Ladies Cycling Team	+ 18"
4	Amy Cure (AUS)	Australia National Team	+ 18"
5	Lizzie Armitstead (GBR)	Boels–Dolmans Cycling Team	+ 18"

General Classification after Stage 7

	Rider	Team	Time
1	Emma Johansson (SWE)	Orica–AIS	17h 07' 57"
2	Shara Gillow (AUS)	Orica–AIS	+ 32"
3	Lisa Brennauer (GER)	Specialized–lululemon	+ 1' 23"
4	Anna van der Breggen (NED)	Sengers Ladies Cycling Team	+ 1' 31"
5	Linda Villumsen (NZL)	Wiggle–Honda	+ 1' 36"

== Classification leadership ==
Stage	Winner	General classification	Points classification	Mountains classification	Young rider classification	Active rider classification	Team classification
1	Emma Johansson	Emma Johansson	Emma Johansson	Christine Majerus	Alena Amialiusik	Linda Villumsen	Orica–AIS
2	Carmen Small	Emma Johansson	Emma Johansson	Christine Majerus	Alena Amialiusik	Anna Schnitzmeier	Orica–AIS
3	Annemiek van Vleuten	Emma Johansson	Emma Johansson	Christine Majerus	Anna van der Breggen	Andrea Graus	Orica–AIS
4	Shara Gillow	Emma Johansson	Emma Johansson	Christine Majerus	Anna van der Breggen	Andrea Graus	Orica–AIS
5	Emma Johansson	Emma Johansson	Emma Johansson	Christine Majerus	Anna van der Breggen	Hanka Kupfernagel	Orica–AIS
6	Valentina Scandolara	Emma Johansson	Emma Johansson	Christine Majerus	Anna van der Breggen	Tayler Wiles	Orica–AIS
7	Tatiana Guderzo	Emma Johansson	Emma Johansson	Christine Majerus	Anna van der Breggen	Valentina Scandolara	Orica–AIS
Final		Emma Johansson	Emma Johansson	Christine Majerus	Anna van der Breggen	Linda Villumsen	Orica–AIS

== Final classification ==
	Rider	Team	Time
1	Emma Johansson (SWE)	Orica–AIS	17h 07' 57"
2	Shara Marche (AUS)	Orica–AIS	+ 32"
3	Lisa Brennauer (GER)	Team Specialized-lululemon	+ 1' 23"
4	Anna van der Breggen (NED)	Sengers Ladies Cycling Team	+ 1' 31"
5	Linda Villumsen (NZL)	Wiggle Honda Pro Cycling	+ 1' 36"
6	Amanda Spratt (AUS)	Orica–AIS	+ 2' 23"
7	Lucinda Brand (NED)	Rabobank-Liv Giant	+ 2' 43"
8	Georgia Williams (NZL)		+ 2' 48"
9	Hanka Kupfernagel (GER)	Germany	+ 2' 58"
10	Roxane Knetemann (NED)	Rabobank-Liv Giant	+ 3' 36"

== See also ==
- 2009 Thüringen Rundfahrt der Frauen
- 2013 in women's road cycling
