= 2009 UCI Road World Championships – Women's time trial =

Women's time trial
2009 UCI Road World Championships
- Rainbow jersey

Race details
- Dates: 23 September 2009
- Stages: 1
- Distance: 26.8 km (16.7 mi)
- Winning time: 35' 36"

Medalists
	Gold	Kristin Armstrong (USA)
	Silver	Noemi Cantele (ITA)
	Bronze	Linda Villumsen (DEN)

The Women's time trial of the 2009 UCI Road World Championships cycling event took place on 23 September 2009 in Mendrisio, Switzerland.

== Qualification ==
All National Federations were allowed to register four riders for the race, with a maximum of two riders to start. In addition to this number, the outgoing World Champion and the current continental champions were also able to take part.

Champion	Name	Note
Outgoing World Champion	(United States) Amber Neben (USA)	
African Champion	(South Africa) Cashandra Slingerland (RSA)	Did not participate
Asian Champion	Tang Kerong (CHN)	Did not participate
European Champion (under-23)	(Netherlands) Ellen van Dijk (NED)	
Oceanian Champion	(Australia) Bridie O'Donnell (AUS)	

== Final classification ==
Rank	Rider	Country	Time
1	Kristin Armstrong	United States	35' 36"
2	Noemi Cantele	Italy	+ 55"
3	Linda Villumsen	Denmark	+ 58"
4	Judith Arndt	Germany	+ 1' 24"
5	Christiane Soeder	Austria	+ 1' 28"
6	Amber Neben	United States	+ 1' 29"
7	Tatiana Antoshina	Russia	+ 1' 31"
8	Tara Whitten	Canada	+ 1' 33"
9	Karin Thürig	Switzerland	+ 1' 38"
10	Jeannie Longo	France	+ 1' 48"
11	Emma Pooley	United Kingdom	+ 1' 57"
12	Trixi Worrack	Germany	+ 2' 02"
13	Alex Rhodes	Australia	+ 2' 07"
14	Jessica Phillips	United States	+ 2' 11"
15	Regina Bruins	Netherlands	+ 2' 14"
16	Diana Žiliūtė	Lithuania	+ 2' 27"
17	Trine Schmidt	Denmark	+ 2' 27"
18	Tatiana Guderzo	Italy	+ 2' 33"
19	Julie Beveridge	Canada	+ 2' 34"
20	Ellen van Dijk	Netherlands	+ 2' 43"
21	Vicki Whitelaw	Australia	+ 2' 59"
22	Bridie O'Donnell	Australia	+ 3' 04"
23	Wendy Houvenaghel	United Kingdom	+ 3' 22"
24	Alexandra Burchenkova	Russia	+ 3' 33"
25	Eneritz Iturriagaechevarria Mazaga	Spain	+ 3' 44"
26	Vilija Sereikaitė	Lithuania	+ 3' 46"
27	Emilia Fahlin	Sweden	+ 3' 51"
28	Pascale Schnider	Switzerland	+ 4' 08"
29	Giuseppina Grassi Herrera	Mexico	+ 4' 14"
30	Iryna Shpylyova	Ukraine	+ 4' 24"
31	Blaža Klemenčič	Slovenia	+ 4' 27"
32	Verónica Leal Balderas	Mexico	+ 4' 40"
33	Olivia Dillon	Ireland	+ 4' 43"
34	Martina Růžičková	Czech Republic	+ 4' 50"
35	Evgeniya Vysotskaya	Ukraine	+ 4' 58"
36	Nontasin Chanpeng	Thailand	+ 6' 15"
37	Kathryn Bertine	Saint Kitts and Nevis	+ 6' 17"
38	Debora Galves Lopez	Spain	+ 6' 52"
39	Monrudee Chapookam	Thailand	+ 7' 03"
40	Polona Batagelj	Slovenia	+ 7' 09"
41	Monica Ceccon	Saint Kitts and Nevis	+ 9' 19"
