= Wiggle High5 Pro Cycling =

British cycling team

Team information
- UCI code: WHT
- Registered: Great Britain
- Founded: 2012
- Disbanded: 2018
- Discipline: Road
- Status: UCI Women's Team
- Bicycles: Colnago

Key personnel
- General manager: Rochelle Gilmore
- Team managers: Allan Davis; Kim Palmer

Team name history
- 2013–2015 2016–2018: Wiggle–Honda; Wiggle High5 Pro Cycling
Wiggle High5 Pro Cycling jersey
Jersey

Wiggle High5 Pro Cycling (UCI team code: WHT) was a British professional cycling team based in Belgium, which competed in elite road bicycle racing and track cycling events, such as the UCI Women's Road World Cup. The team closed at the end of 2018.

The team was the idea of the manager and rider Rochelle Gilmore, and was formed with backing from the Bradley Wiggins Foundation and British Cycling. The final main sponsors of the team were Wiggle and High5.

== Team history ==
=== 2013 ===
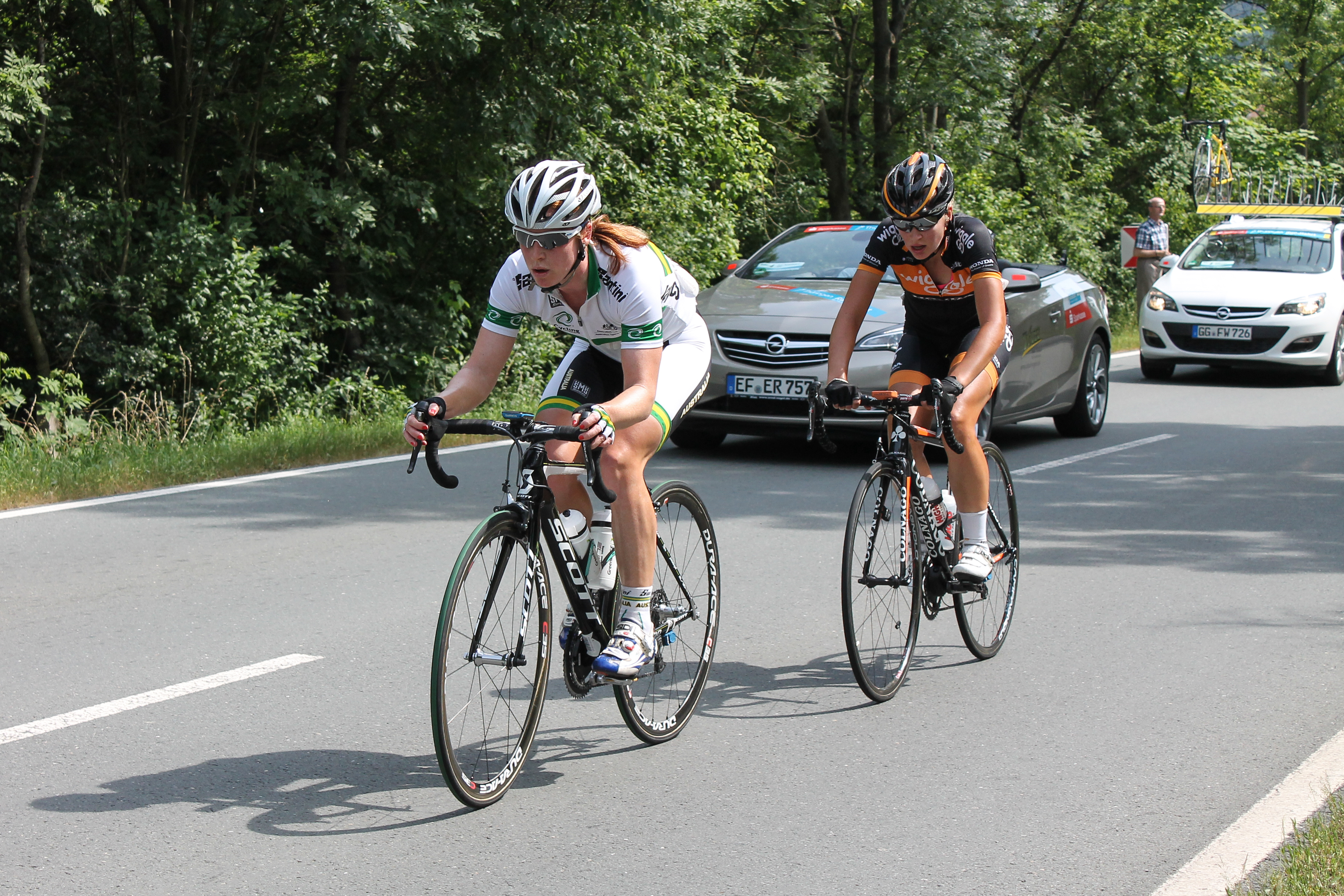
Lauren Kitchen at the Thüringen-Rundfahrt der Frauen.

On 3 March the team achieved its first ever victory when Emily Collins won the Omloop van het Hageland one day race in Belgium. Collins Shelley Olds (Team TIBCO) and Emma Johansson (Orica–AIS) in a final sprint. On 18 May the team earned its first overall General classification win at the Tour of Zhoushan Island in China where Giorgia Bronzini took overall victory from the Hitec Products UCK pairing of Elisa Longo Borghini and Cecilie Gotaas Johnsen by 14 seconds and 1 minute 6 seconds respectively. The team's second overall victory came at the 2013 La Route de France, where Linda Villumsen won stage 7 and in doing so took overall victory from Emma Johansson by 5 minutes 52 seconds. The race will be remembered for the record breaking efforts of Bronzini who won six consecutive stages (1–6) breaking the all-time record for consecutive stage wins in a women's stage racing and meaning that the team won all 7 road stages. The team finished the season fifth in the UCI Rankings (1060 points) and seventh in the Women's World Cup rankings (166 points).

On 23 August 2013 it was announced that reigning Swedish national road race champion, Emilia Fahlin, would be joining the team for the 2014 season. Also joining the team for the 2014 season are Peta Mullens and current Spanish National Time Trial champion, Anna Sanchis. The team have also signed Joanne Tralaggan for the remainder of 2013.

On 24 August 2013 it was announced that Lauren Kitchen would be leaving the team, joining Hitec Products UCK for the 2014 season. Simon Cope left after Wiggle–Honda's inaugural season to direct continental team Madison Genesis in 2014.

=== 2014 ===
The team took a total of 16 wins in 2014.

On 3 July 2014 it was announced that the co-founder of Le Tour Entier, Kathryn Bertine, had been signed by the team to ride La Course by Le Tour de France. On 15 October Jessica Mundy signed with the team with immediate effect On 5 November 2014 the team announced the signing of Rebecca Wiasak for the remainder of 2014.

On 30 September 2014 it was announced that Elisa Longo Borghini would join the team for 2015 with Dani King signing a contract extension. On 7 October the team announced the signing of Anna Christian and two-time Giro Rosa champion Mara Abbott for the 2015 season. On 10 October, the team announced Team TIBCO–To The Top director Egon van Kessel would be taking on the role of the team's DS for 2015. On 13 October 2014 Audrey Cordon and Jolien D'Hoore joined the team and on 22 October Annette Edmondson joined the team. On 25 October 2014 the team announced the signing of current British National Criterium Champion, Eileen Roe with immediate effect and in time to compete in the Australian Criterium season. On 27 October 2014 the team announced the signing of Chloe Hosking on a one-year contract with Emilia Fahlin signing an extension. On 4 November 2014 Anna Sanchis and Amy Roberts signed one-year extensions. On 6 November 2014, Wiggle–Honda announced that Mayuko Hagiwara also extended her contract. On 10 November 2014 Giorgia Bronzini signed a contract extension with the team for 2015. On 4 December 2014 the team announced they had signed Georgia Baker for the remainder of 2014.

On 8 September 2014 it was announced that Laura Trott would leave the team and join Matrix Fitness Pro Cycling and on 9 September 2014 it was reported that Linda Villumsen will leave the team to join the UnitedHealthcare Women's Team for the 2015 season. On 30 September it was reported that Elinor Barker would leave to join Matrix Fitness–Vulpine with Joanna Rowsell leaving for Pearl Izumi Sports Tours International and on 1 October 2014 it was announced that Charlotte Becker would be leaving for Team Hitec Products. On 30 October Beatrice Bartelloni left the team, joining Alé–Cipollini for the 2015 season. On 23 November 2014 Anna-Bianca Schnitzmeier retired. On 16 December 2014 Emily Collins announced she would leave the team via Twitter.

=== 2015 ===
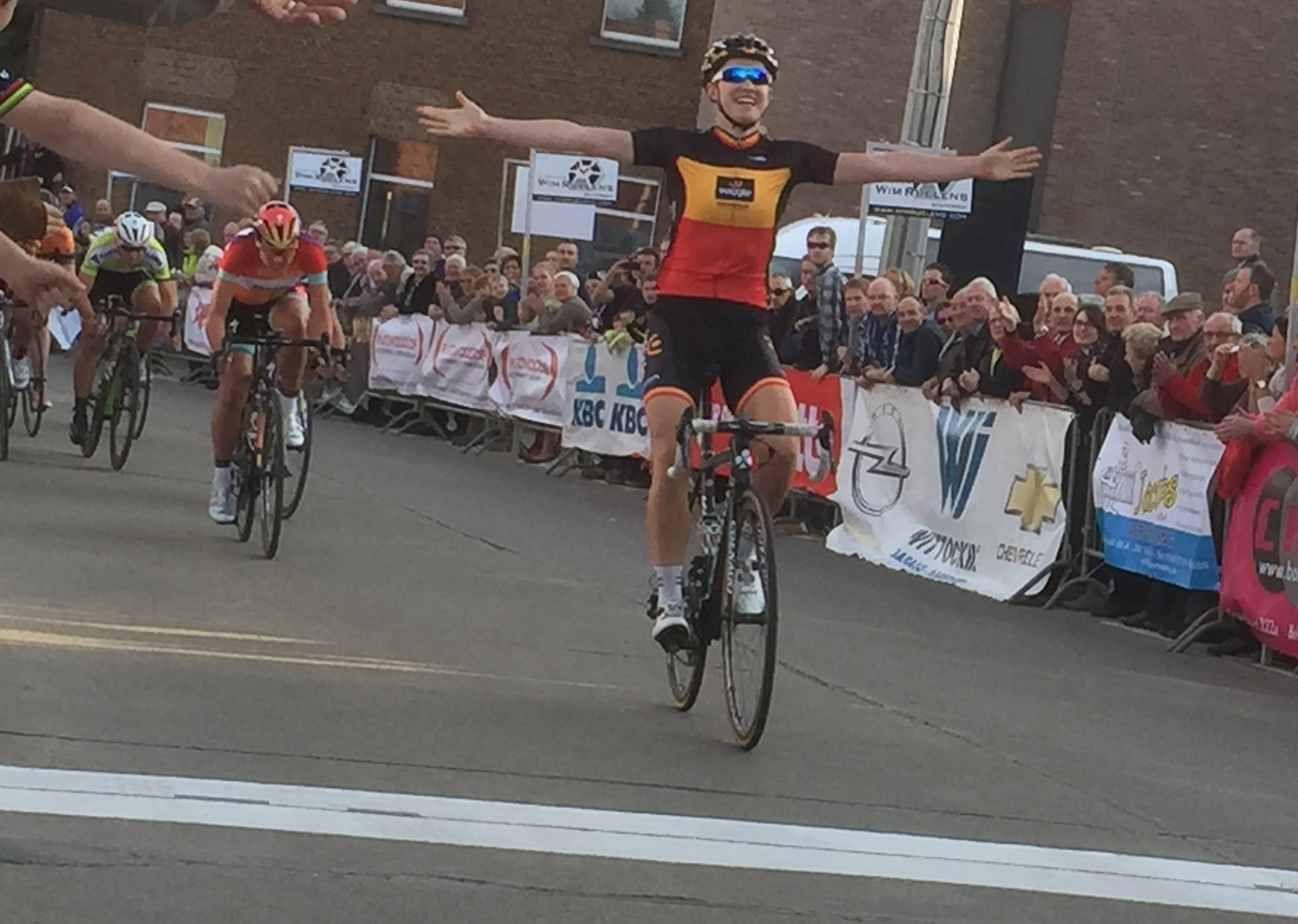
D'Hoore takes the victory in Omloop van het Hageland.

On 2 January Chloe Hosking scored the team's first win of the 2015 season by taking Stage 1 of the Bay Classic Series – this also marked Hoskings first victory since joining the team. Hosking would then go onto the claim the overall win in the race, with Bronzini taking another stage win for the team. The team's next win came at the Omloop van het Hageland where current Belgian national champion and new signing – Jolien D'Hoore claimed her first win and the team's first on European soil. The team would then go onto an enjoy a rich run of results, with D'Hoore winning Boels Rental Ronde van Drenthe, Bronzini claiming Acht van Westerveld, new signing Audrey Cordon winning Cholet Pays de Loire Dames and another new signing Elisa Longo Borghini winning the Tour of Flanders. In April, D'Hoore went on to win the first stage of the Energiewacht Tour.

Less than 24 hours after claiming the 2015 Australian National Road Race championship, the team announced they had re-signed Peta Mullens for the 2015 season.

The team took a total of 35 wins in 2015, more than any other women's cycling team that year. In August 2015, it was announced that Emma Johansson would join the team on a two-year deal for the 2016 season. On 1 September 2015 the team announced that Amy Pieters would be joining them for the 2016 season, followed shortly afterwards by the news that Lucy Garner was signed as well.

=== 2016 ===
Donna Rae-Szalinski replaced Egon van Kessel as directeur sportif at Wiggle High5 mid-season through 2016, Donna coming in from directing Rochelle Gilmore's Australian NRS team High5 Dream Team.

=== 2017 ===
At the end of 2017 the team saw large changes in the team members. Of the fifteen rider roster, three riders retiring Claudia Lichtenberg, Emma Johansson, and Anna Sanchis; and an additional four riders transferring out to other teams Giorgia Bronzini, Jolien D'Hoore, Mayuko Hagiwara, and Amy Roberts, as well as assistant directeur sportif Martin Vestby. Wiggle High5 would sign on eight new riders for 2018; Katie Archibald, Rachele Barbieri, Elinor Barker, Lisa Brennauer, Martina Ritter, Macey Stewart, Kirsten Wild, and Eri Yonamine.

=== 2018 ===
Wiggle High5 started 2018 with one of the largest UCI Women's rosters, with eight returning riders and eight new signings. In between the end of the Australian summer races in January and the start of the European spring races at the end of February, it was revealed the team had terminated the employment of their head directeur sportif Donna Rae-Szalinski. Leaving the team also was technical director and then incoming DS Alex Greenfield, head mechanic Tim Haverals, and remaining soigneur Laura Weislo. The team brought in Allan Davis who had started working with new UCI Continental men's team Brisbane Continental Cycling Team in 2018, as Wiggle High 5's DS while legal proceedings are underway with Rae-Szalinski. Ahead of taking her first duty at the Tour of Chongming Island at the end of April, the team announced Kim Palmer as incoming assistant directeur sportif; who like former DS Rae-Szalinski had led the now disbanded High5 Dream Team, and various Australian national team squads.

With Cycling Australia pulling support for national development teams that were usually where Amy Gillett Foundation Cycling Scholarship recipients would race with, near the end of April it was announced that Grace Brown was selected as the 2018 scholarship holder and would start racing overseas with Wiggle High5 starting with the mid-May Tour of California.

On 25 July 2018, Rochelle Gilmore announced that the team would not run in 2019 in an announcement video on their YouTube channel.

The first departure of the team was Grace Brown, returning after her Amy Gillett Scholarship period to race domestically with Team Holden Gusto. As the largest UCI Women's team, and with the team shutting down by the end of the year, the first rider announcing their new team for 2019 was Elisa Longo Borghini. Later in August, Hitec Products–Birk Sport announced Lucy Garner would be switching teams from Wiggle High5. Then a week later, WNT–Rotor Pro Cycling announced both Kirsten Wild and Lisa Brennauer would join in 2019 on two year contracts. In early September, FDJ Nouvelle-Aquitaine Futuroscope announced Emilia Fahlin would join the team for 2019.

== Team roster ==
Rider	Date of birth
Katie Archibald (GBR)	12 March 1994 (age 32)
Rachele Barbieri (ITA)	21 February 1997 (age 29)
Elinor Barker (GBR)	7 September 1994 (age 31)
Lisa Brennauer (GER)	8 June 1988 (age 38)
Grace Brown (AUS)	7 July 1992 (age 34)
Audrey Cordon (FRA)	22 September 1989 (age 36)
Amy Cure (AUS)	31 December 1992 (age 33)
Annette Edmondson (AUS)	12 December 1991 (age 34)
Emilia Fahlin (SWE)	24 October 1988 (age 37)

Rider	Date of birth
Lucy Garner (GBR)	20 September 1994 (age 31)
Grace Garner (GBR)	19 June 1997 (age 29)
Julie Leth (DNK)	13 July 1992 (age 34)
Elisa Longo Borghini (ITA)	10 December 1991 (age 34)
Martina Ritter (AUT)	23 September 1982 (age 43)
Macey Stewart (AUS)	16 January 1996 (age 30)
Kirsten Wild (NED)	15 October 1982 (age 43)
Eri Yonamine (JPN)	25 April 1991 (age 35)

== Major wins ==
2013
Omloop van het Hageland, Emily Collins
Classica Citta di Padova, Giorgia Bronzini
Stage 1 Grand Prix Elsy Jacobs, Giorgia Bronzini
Knokke-Heist – Bredene, Giorgia Bronzini
Stage 2 Tour of Chongming Island, Giorgia Bronzini
Championnat de Wallonie, Mayuko Hagiwara
Moergestel Criterium, Lauren Kitchen
Elveden Estate Cycle Race, Laura Trott
Overall Tour of Zhoushan Island, Giorgia Bronzini

Stage 1, Giorgia Bronzini

Milk Race, Dani King
Stage 2 Giro d'Italia Femminile, Giorgia Bronzini
Combativity award Stage 1 Thüringen Rundfahrt der Frauen, Linda Villumsen
Combativity award Stage 2 Thüringen Rundfahrt der Frauen, Anna-Bianca Schnitzmeier
RideLondon GP, Laura Trott
Overall La Route de France, Linda Villumsen

Stages 1, 2, 3, 4, 5 & 6, Giorgia Bronzini
Stage 7, Linda Villumsen

Points classification, Tour Cycliste Féminin International de l'Ardèche, Giorgia Bronzini

Mountains classification, Linda Villumsen
Combination classification, Linda Villumsen
Prologue, Linda Villumsen
Stages 1, 3 & 6, Giorgia Bronzini

International Belgian Open (3 km Time Trial), Joanna Rowsell
Stage 1 Giro della Toscana Int. Femminile – Memorial Michela Fanini, Giorgia Bronzini
Revolution series Manchester (Points race), Dani King
UCI Track Cycling World Cup – Manchester (Team Pursuit), Dani King, Joanna Rowsell, Laura Trott & Elinor Barker
UCI Track Cycling World Cup – Manchester (Individual pursuit), Joanna Rowsell
UCI Track Cycling World Cup – Manchester (Omnium), Laura Trott
Copa Internacional de Pista (Scratch Race), Beatrice Bartelloni
Overall NSW Grand Prix, Charlotte Becker

Round 1, Lauren Kitchen
Round 2, Peta Mullens

Stan Siejka Classic, Lauren Kitchen
2014
Overall Michelton Bay Classic Series, Giorgia Bronzini

Sprints classification, Peta Mullens
Teams classification
Stages 1, 3 & 4, Giorgia Bronzini

Unley Criterium, Peta Mullens
Grand Prix de Dottignies, Giorgia Bronzini
Wallonia Cup #3 (XCO), Peta Mullens
Memorial Stefano e Diego Trovò, Giorgia Bronzini
Stage 3 Tour of Chongming Island, Giorgia Bronzini
Overall Tour of Zhoushan Island, Charlotte Becker

Points classification, Giorgia Bronzini
Best Asian rider classification, Mayuko Hagiwara
Stage 1, Charlotte Becker
Stage 3, Giorgia Bronzini

Matrix Fitness GP Series – Redditch, Amy Roberts
Hillingdon GP, Amy Roberts
Overall Holme Valley Wheelers 2-day Stage race, Joanna Rowsell

Stages 1 & 3, Laura Trott

Overall Surf & Turf 2-day Stage race, Laura Trott

Prologue, Stages 1 & 2, Laura Trott

Stage 2 Giro d'Italia Femminile, Giorgia Bronzini
Fenioux Track Championships (Omnium), Laura Trott
Fiorenzuola d'Arda (Points race), Giorgia Bronzini
Commonwealth Games Track Championships (Individual pursuit), Joanna Rowsell
Commonwealth Games Track Championships (Points race), Laura Trott
RideLondon Grand Prix, Giorgia Bronzini
Stage 3 La Route de France, Giorgia Bronzini

Combaitivity award Stage 2, Charlotte Becker
Combaitivity award Stage 5, Charlotte Becker

Overall Tour Cycliste Féminin International de l'Ardèche, Linda Villumsen

Points classification, Giorgia Bronzini
Stage 1, 4 & 6, Giorgia Bronzini
Stage 2 (ITT), Linda Villumsen

Caribbean Time Trial Championships, Kathryn Bertine
Revolution Series Omnium (Round 1), Laura Trott
Melbourne Kermesse, Peta Mullens
Gent Track Championships, (Scratch race), Giorgia Bronzini
UCI Track Cycling World Cup – Guadalajara, Laura Trott, Elinor Barker & Amy Roberts
UCI Track Cycling World Cup – London, Laura Trott, Elinor Barker & Joanna Rowsell
2015
Points classification Women's Tour Down Under, Annette Edmondson

Stage 3, Giorgia Bronzini

Teams classification Ladies Tour of Qatar
Omloop van het Hageland, Jolien D'Hoore
Acht van Westerveld, Giorgia Bronzini
Boels Rental Ronde van Drenthe, Jolien D'Hoore
Cholet Pays de Loire Dames, Audrey Cordon-Ragot
Tour of Flanders, Elisa Longo Borghini
Stage 1 Energiewacht Tour, Jolien D'Hoore
Marianne Vos Classic, Chloe Hosking
Tour of Chongming Island World Cup, Giorgia Bronzini
La Classique Morbihan, Chloe Hosking
Diamond Tour, Jolien D'Hoore
Stage 2 Aviva Women's Tour, Jolien D'Hoore
Italian rider classification Giro d'Italia Femminile, Elisa Longo Borghini

Stage 6, Mayuko Hagiwara
Stage 9, Mara Abbott

Overall BeNe Ladies Tour, Jolien D'Hoore

Points classification, Jolien D'Hoore
Team classification
Stages 1, 2a (ITT) & 2b, Jolien D'Hoore

Stage 3 Tour de Bretagne Féminin, Mayuko Hagiwara
Overall La Route de France, Elisa Longo Borghini

Stages 2 & 6, Giorgia Bronzini
Stages 3 & 5, Elisa Longo Borghini

Crescent Women World Cup Vårgårda, Jolien D'Hoore
Stages 1 & 2 Holland Ladies Tour, Jolien D'Hoore
2016
Stage 4 Ladies Tour of Qatar, Chloe Hosking
Mountains classification Women's Tour Down Under, Dani King

Stage 2, Annette Edmondson

Asian Cycling Championships – Time Trial, Mayuko Hagiwara
Dwars door Vlaanderen, Amy Pieters
Overall Euskal Emakumeen XXIX Bira, Emma Johansson

Points classification, Emma Johansson
Stages 1 & 2, Emma Johansson
Stage 3, Giorgia Bronzini

Overall Tour of the Gila, Mara Abbott

Mountains classification, Mara Abbott
Stages 1 & 5, Mara Abbott

Diamond Tour, Jolien D'Hoore
Italian rider classification Giro d'Italia Femminile, Elisa Longo Borghini

Stages 1 & 8, Giorgia Bronzini
Stage 3, Chloe Hosking
Stage 5, Mara Abbott

Overall BeNe Ladies Tour, Jolien D'Hoore

Points classification, Jolien D'Hoore
Stages 1, 3 & 4 (ITT), Jolien D'Hoore

Points classification Tour de Feminin-O cenu Českého Švýcarska, Jolien D'Hoore
Overall La Course by Le Tour de France, Chloe Hosking
Mountains classification Thüringen Rundfahrt der Frauen, Emma Johansson
Prologue La Route de France, Amy Pieters
Stage 3 La Route de France, Chloe Hosking
Madrid Challenge by La Vuelta, Jolien D'Hoore
2017
Omloop van het Hageland, Jolien D'Hoore
Strade Bianche, Elisa Longo Borghini
Pajot Hills Classic, Annette Edmondson
Grand Prix de Dottignies, Jolien D'Hoore
Overall Tour of Chongming Island, Jolien D'Hoore

Mountains classification
Stages 2 & 3, Jolien D'Hoore

Stage 4 Tour of California, Giorgia Bronzini
Mountains classification The Women's Tour, Audrey Cordon-Ragot

Stage 5, Jolien D'Hoore

Italian rider classification Giro d'Italia Femminile, Elisa Longo Borghini

Stage 4, Jolien D'Hoore

Prologue BeNe Ladies Tour, Annette Edmondson
Stage 1 Ladies Tour of Norway, Jolien D'Hoore
Prologue & Stage 2 Belgium Tour, Jolien D'Hoore
Bretagne Regional Time Trial Championships, Audrey Cordon-Ragot
Chrono des Nations, Audrey Cordon-Ragot
2018
Stage 1 Women's Tour Down Under, Annette Edmondson
Towards Zero Race Melbourne, Annette Edmondson
Points classification Healthy Ageing Tour, Kirsten Wild

Stage 3a, Kirsten Wild

Commonwealth Games

Team Pursuit, Amy Cure and Annette Edmondson
Scratch Race, Amy Cure
Individual Pursuit, Katie Archibald
Points Race, Elinor Barker

Mountains classification Tour of Chongming Island, Lucy Garner

Stage 3, Kirsten Wild

Points classification Women's Tour de Yorkshire

Stage 1, Kirsten Wild

Overall Thüringen Rundfahrt der Frauen, Lisa Brennauer

German rider classification Thüringen Rundfahrt der Frauen, Lisa Brennauer
Stage 4 Thüringen Rundfahrt der Frauen, Lisa Brennauer

Mountains classification The Women's Tour, Elisa Longo Borghini
Italian rider classification Giro Rosa, Elisa Longo Borghini

Stage 2 Giro Rosa, Kirsten Wild

Team classification BeNe Ladies Tour

Prologue, Katie Archibald

RideLondon Classique, Kirsten Wild
Points classification Giro delle Marche in Rosa, Rachele Barbieri

Stage 2, Elisa Longo Borghini

== Team Ranking ==
Season	2013	2014	2015	2016	2017
Women's World Cup	7th (166 Pts)	8th (310 Pts)	2nd (1071 Pts)	Did not exist
UCI Women's Ranking	5th (1060 Pts)	7th (1252 Pts)	3rd (2735 Pts)	3rd (3196 Pts)	6th (2287 Pts)
Women's World Tour	Did not exist			2nd (2245 pts)	3rd (1824 Pts)

== National, continental and world champions ==
2013
Australian U23 Criterium, Lauren Kitchen
World Track (Team Pursuit), Dani King
World Track (Team Pursuit), Joanna Rowsell
World Track (Team Pursuit), Laura Trott
British Time Trial, Joanna Rowsell
British U23 Road Race, Laura Trott
British Track (Individual Pursuit ), Laura Trott
British Track (Points Race), Laura Trott
British Track (Madison), Laura Trott
British Track (Team Pursuit), Elinor Barker
British Track (Team Pursuit), Dani King
British Track (Team Pursuit), Joanna Rowsell
British Track (Team Pursuit), Laura Trott
European Track (Team Pursuit), Elinor Barker
European Track (Team Pursuit), Dani King
European Track (Team Pursuit), Joanna Rowsell
European Track (Team Pursuit), Laura Trott
European Track (Omnium), Laura Trott
Italian Track (Keirin), Giorgia Bronzini
Italian Track (Team Pursuit), Beatrice Bartelloni
New Zealand Criterium, Emily Collins
2014
World Track (Team Pursuit), Elinor Barker
World Track (Team Pursuit), Joanna Rowsell
World Track (Team Pursuit), Laura Trott
Australian XCE, Peta Mullens
Japanese Time Trial, Mayuko Hagiwara
Japanese Road, Mayuko Hagiwara
British Road, Laura Trott
British U23 Road, Laura Trott
British Track (Team Pursuit), Elinor Barker
British Track (Team Pursuit), Dani King
British Track (Team Pursuit), Joanna Rowsell
British Track (Team Pursuit), Laura Trott
British Track (Scratch Race), Laura Trott
Italian Track (Team Pursuit), Beatrice Bartelloni
European Track (Team pursuit), Laura Trott
European Track (Team pursuit), Elinor Barker
European Track (Team pursuit), Joanna Rowsell
European Track (Omnium), Laura Trott
2015
Australian Track (Madison), Jessica Mundy
Australian Track (Madison), Annette Edmondson
Oceania Track (Omnium), Annette Edmondson
Belgian Track (Omnium), Jolien D'Hoore
World Track (Team pursuit), Annette Edmondson
World Track (Individual pursuit), Rebecca Wiasak
World Track (Omnium), Annette Edmondson
French Time Trial, Audrey Cordon
Spanish Time Trial, Anna Sanchis
Spanish Road, Anna Sanchis
Japanese Road, Mayuko Hagiwara
Belgian Road, Jolien D'Hoore
2016
Belgian Track (500m), Jolien D'Hoore
Belgian Track (Scratch race), Jolien D'Hoore
Belgian Track (Points race), Jolien D'Hoore
Belgian Track (Individual pursuit), Jolien D'Hoore
Asian Cycling Championships (ITT), Mayuko Hagiwara
Australian Track (Points race), Annette Edmondson
Australian Track (Scratch race), Annette Edmondson
Italian Time Trial, Elisa Longo Borghini
Sweden Time Trial, Emma Johansson
French Time Trial, Audrey Cordon
Spanish Time Trial, Anna Sanchis
European Track (Madison), Jolien D'Hoore
2017
Oceania Track (Team pursuit), Annette Edmondson
Oceania Track (Team pursuit), Amy Cure
Oceania Track (Madison), Amy Cure
Oceania Track (Madison), Annette Edmondson
Oceania Track (Omnium), Amy Cure
Australian Track (Points race), Amy Cure
Australian Track (Scratch race), Amy Cure
French Time Trial, Audrey Cordon
Italian Road Race, Elisa Longo Borghini
Italian Time Trial, Elisa Longo Borghini
Belgian Road, Jolien D'Hoore
Denmark Track (Points race), Julie Leth
2018
British Track (Individual pursuit), Katie Archibald
British Track (Scratch race), Katie Archibald
British Track (Points race), Katie Archibald
Australian Track (Team pursuit), Annette Edmondson
Australian Track (Points race), Amy Cure
Australian Track (Scratch race), Amy Cure
World Track (Scratch race), Kirsten Wild
World Track (Omnium), Kirsten Wild
World Track (Madison), Katie Archibald
World Track (Points race), Kirsten Wild
Japanese Time Trial, Eri Yonamine
Austrian Time Trial, Martina Ritter
French Time Trial, Audrey Cordon
German Time Trial, Lisa Brennauer
Japanese Road Race, Eri Yonamine
Swedish Road Race, Emilia Fahlin
German Track (Individual pursuit), Lisa Brennauer
European Track (Individual pursuit), Lisa Brennauer
European Track (Scratch race), Kirsten Wild
European Track (Team pursuit), Katie Archibald
European Track (Team pursuit), Elinor Barker,
European Track (Madison), Julie Leth
Italian Track (Omnium), Rachele Barbieri
Dutch Track (Points race), Kirsten Wild
