= 2013 Tour Cycliste Féminin International de l'Ardèche =

Race details
- Dates: 24–28 August 2013
- Stages: Prologue + 4 stages
- Distance: 314.8 km (195.6 mi)

Results
Jersey awarded to the overall winner	Winner	Tatiana Antoshina (RUS)	(MCipollini–Giordana)
	Second	Ashleigh Moolman (RSA)	(Lotto–Intermarché Ladies)
	Third	Karol-Ann Canuel (CAN)	(Vienne Futuroscope)
Jersey awarded to the points classification winner	Points	Giorgia Bronzini (ITA)	(Wiggle High5)
Jersey awarded to the mountains classification winner	Mountains	Linda Villumsen (NZL)	(Wiggle High5)
Jersey awarded to the young rider classification winner	Young rider	Rossella Ratto (ITA)	(Hitec Products UCK)
Jersey awarded to the combination classification winner	Combination	Linda Villumsen (NZL)	(Wiggle High5)
Jersey awarded to the sprints classification winner	Sprints	Elena Cecchini (ITA)	(Faren–Let's Go Finland)
	Team	Team Optum p/b Kelly Benefit Strategies	

The 2013 Tour Cycliste Féminin International de l'Ardèche was a women's cycle stage race held in France. The tour was held from 2 September to 5 September, 2013. The tour has a UCI rating of 2.2.

== Stages ==
=== Prologue ===
2 September Vallon Pont d'Arc to Vallon Pont d'Arc 2.5 km (1.6 mi)

Prologue result

	Rider	Team	Time
1	Linda Villumsen (NZL)	Wiggle High5	3' 04"
2	Alexandra Burchenkova (RUS)	Gazprom–RusVelo	+ 2"
3	Lauren Kitchen (AUS)	Wiggle High5	+ 5"
4	Jade Wilcoxson (USA)	Team Optum p/b Kelly Benefit Strategies	+ 5"
5	Janel Holcomb (USA)	Team Optum p/b Kelly Benefit Strategies	+ 6"

General classification after Prologue

	Rider	Team	Time
1	Linda Villumsen (NZL)	Wiggle High5	3' 04"
2	Alexandra Burchenkova (RUS)	Gazprom–RusVelo	+ 2"
3	Lauren Kitchen (AUS)	Wiggle High5	+ 5"
4	Jade Wilcoxson (USA)	Team Optum p/b Kelly Benefit Strategies	+ 5"
5	Janel Holcomb (USA)	Team Optum p/b Kelly Benefit Strategies	+ 6"

=== Stage 1 ===
3 September Rochegude to Beauchastel 120.9 km (75.1 mi)

Stage 1 result

	Rider	Team	Time
1	Giorgia Bronzini (ITA)	Wiggle High5	3h 09' 33"
2	Tiffany Cromwell (AUS)	Orica–AIS	s.t.
3	Elena Cecchini (ITA)	Faren–Let's Go Finland	s.t.
4	Oxana Kozonchuk (RUS)	RusVelo	s.t.
5	Katarzyna Pawłowska (POL)	GSD Gestion — Kallisto	s.t.

General classification after Stage 1

	Rider	Team	Time
1	Linda Villumsen (NZL)	Wiggle High5	3h 12' 27"
2	Alexandra Burchenkova (RUS)	RusVelo	+ 2"
3	Lauren Kitchen (AUS)	Wiggle High5	+ 5"
4	Jade Wilcoxson (USA)	Team Optum p/b Kelly Benefit Strategies	+ 5"
5	Janel Holcomb (USA)	Team Optum p/b Kelly Benefit Strategies	+ 6"

=== Stage 2 (ITT) ===
4 September Vals-les-Bains to Vals-les-Bains 3.4 km (2.1 mi)

Stage 2 result

	Rider	Team	Time
1	Alena Amialiusik (BLR)	Be Pink	5' 15"
2	Noemi Cantele (ITA)	Be Pink	+ 9"
3	Linda Villumsen (NZL)	Wiggle High5	+ 9"
4	Chloe McConville (AUS)		+ 9"
5	Jade Wilcoxson (USA)	Team Optum p/b Kelly Benefit Strategies	+ 9"

General classification after Stage 2

	Rider	Team	Time
1	Alena Amialiusik (BLR)	Be Pink	3h 17' 58"
2	Linda Villumsen (NZL)	Wiggle High5	+ 3"
3	Jade Wilcoxson (USA)	Team Optum p/b Kelly Benefit Strategies	+ 8"
4	Chloe McConville (USA)		+ 12"
5	Tiffany Cromwell (AUS)	Orica–AIS	+ 12"

=== Stage 3 ===
4 September Vals-les-Bains to Le Teil 77.4 km (48.1 mi)

Stage 3 result

	Rider	Team	Time
1	Giorgia Bronzini (ITA)	Wiggle High5	2h 19' 32"
2	Rossella Ratto (ITA)	Hitec Products UCK	s.t.
3	Elena Cecchini (ITA)	Faren–Let's Go Finland	s.t.
4	Linda Villumsen (NZL)	Wiggle High5	+ 2"
5	Alena Amialiusik (BLR)}	Be Pink	+ 2"

General classification after Stage 3

	Rider	Team	Time
1	Alena Amialiusik (BLR)	Be Pink	5h 37' 32"
2	Linda Villumsen (NZL)	Wiggle High5	+ 3"
3	Tiffany Cromwell (AUS)	Orica–AIS	+ 12"
4	Ashleigh Moolman (RSA)	Lotto–Intermarché Ladies	+ 12"
5	Rossella Ratto (ITA)	Hitec Products UCK	+ 12"

=== Stage 4 ===
5 September Le Pouzin to Cruas 110.6 km (68.7 mi)

Stage 4 result

	Rider	Team	Time
1	Joëlle Numainville (CAN)	Team Optum p/b Kelly Benefit Strategies	3h 08' 15"
2	Lauren Hall (USA)	Team Optum p/b Kelly Benefit Strategies	s.t.
3	Tiffany Cromwell (USA)	Orica–AIS	s.t.
4	Elena Cecchini (NZL)	Faren–Let's Go Finland	s.t.
5	Oxana Kozonchuk (RUS)}	RusVelo	s.t.

General classification after Stage 4

	Rider	Team	Time
1	Alena Amialiusik (BLR)	Be Pink	8h 45' 47"
2	Linda Villumsen (NZL)	Wiggle High5	+ 3"
3	Tiffany Cromwell (AUS)	Orica–AIS	+ 12"
4	Ashleigh Moolman (RSA)	Lotto–Intermarché Ladies	+ 20"
5	Rossella Ratto (ITA)	Hitec Products UCK	+ 28"

=== Stage 5 ===
6 September

Stage 5 result

	Rider	Team	Time
1	Karol-Ann Canuel (CAN)	Vienne Futuroscope	3h 36' 41"
2	Tatiana Antoshina (RUS)	MCipollini–Giordana	+ 2"
3	Joëlle Numainville (CAN)	Team Optum p/b Kelly Benefit Strategies	+ 59"
4	Carlee Taylor (AUS)	Lotto–Intermarché Ladies	+ 1' 00"
5	Rossella Ratto (RUS)	Hitec Products UCK	+ 1' 00"

General classification after Stage 5

	Rider	Team	Time
1	Linda Villumsen (NZL)	Wiggle High5	12h 23' 31"
2	Tatiana Antoshina (RUS)	MCipollini–Giordana	+ 1"
3	Ashleigh Moolman (RSA)	Lotto–Intermarché Ladies	+ 17"
4	Karol-Ann Canuel (CAN)	Vienne Futuroscope	+ 21"
5	Rossella Ratto (ITA)	Hitec Products UCK	+ 25"

=== Stage 6 ===
7 September

Stage 6 result

	Rider	Team	Time
1	Giorgia Bronzini (ITA)	Wiggle High5	1h 57' 41"
2	Joëlle Numainville (CAN)	Team Optum p/b Kelly Benefit Strategies	s.t.
3	Rossella Ratto (ITA)	Hitec Products UCK	s.t.
4	Ashleigh Moolman (RSA)	Lotto–Intermarché Ladies	s.t.
5	Karol-Ann Canuel (CAN)}	Vienne Futuroscope	s.t.

General classification after Stage 6

	Rider	Team	Time
1	Tatiana Antoshina (BLR)	MCipollini–Giordana	14h 21' 16"
2	Asheligh Moolman (RSA)	Lotto–Intermarché Ladies	+ 13"
3	Karol-Ann Canuel (CAN)	Vienne Futuroscope	+ 17"
4	Rossella Ratto (ITA)	Hitec Products UCK	+ 52"
5	Joëlle Numainville (CAN)	Team Optum p/b Kelly Benefit Strategies	+ 52"

== Classification leadership ==
Stage	Winner	General classification	Young rider classification	Points classification	Mountains classification	Sprints classification	Combination classification	Teams classification
P	Linda Villumsen	Linda Villumsen		Linda Villumsen	Not awarded	Not awarded	Not awarded	Not awarded
1	Giorgia Bronzini	Linda Villumsen	Emily Roper	Linda Villumsen	Paulina Brzeźna	Anastasyia Chulkova	Cecilie Johnsen Gotaas	RusVelo
2	Alena Amialiusik	Alena Amialiusik	Emily Roper	Alena Amialiusik	Paulina Brzeźna	Anastasyia Chulkova	Alena Amialiusik	Be Pink
3	Giorgia Bronzini	Alena Amialiusik	Rossella Ratto	Alena Amialiusik	Alena Amialiusik	Anastasyia Chulkova	Alena Amialiusik	Be Pink
4	Joëlle Numainville	Alena Amialiusik	Rossella Ratto	Alena Amialiusik	Alena Amialiusik	Anastasyia Chulkova	Alena Amialiusik	Be Pink
5	Karol-Ann Canuel	Linda Villumsen	Rossella Ratto	Linda Villumsen	Linda Villumsen	Elena Cecchini	Linda Villumsen	Team Optum p/b Kelly Benefit Strategies
6	Giorgia Bronzini	Tatiana Antoshina	Rossella Ratto	Giorgia Bronzini	Linda Villumsen	Elena Cecchini	Linda Villumsen	Team Optum p/b Kelly Benefit Strategies
Final		Tatiana Antoshina	Rossella Ratto	Giorgia Bronzini	Linda Villumsen	Elena Cecchini	Linda Villumsen	Team Optum p/b Kelly Benefit Strategies
