= 2014 Diamond Tour =

Race details
- Dates: 15 June 2013
- Stages: 1
- Distance: 125 km (77.67 mi)

The 2014 Diamand Tour was a women's bicycle race in Nijlen, Belgium. It was held on 15une over a distance of 125 kilometres (77.7 miles). It was rated by the UCI as a 1.2 category race.

== Results ==
	Cyclist	Team	Time
1	Jolien D'Hoore (BEL)	Lotto–Intermarché Ladies	3h 02' 58"
2	Beatrice Bartelloni (ITA)	Wiggle High5	s.t.
3	Kelly Druyts (BEL)	Topsport Vlaanderen–Pro-Duo	s.t.
4	Emily Collins (NZL)	Wiggle High5	s.t.
5	Fiona Dutriaux (FRA)	Poitou–Charentes.Futuroscope.86	s.t.
6	Amy Roberts (GBR)	Wiggle High5	s.t.
7	Sofie De Vuyst (BEL)	Futurumshop.nl–Zannata	s.t.
8	Kaat Van der Meulen (BEL)	Keukens Redant	s.t.
9	Nina Kessler (NED)	Team SD Worx–Protime	s.t.
10	Lotte Kopecky (BEL)	Topsport Vlaanderen–Pro-Duo	s.t.
