= 2013 La Route de France =

Race details
- Dates: 3–10 August 2013
- Stages: 7 + Prologue
- Distance: 831.8 km (516.9 mi)

Results
Jersey awarded to the overall winner	Winner	Linda Villumsen (NZL)	(Wiggle–Honda)
	Second	Emma Johansson (SWE)	(Orica–AIS)
	Third	Evelyn Stevens (USA)	(Specialized–lululemon)
Jersey awarded to the youth classification winner	Youth	Pauline Ferrand-Prévot (FRA)	(Rabobank-Liv Giant)

The 2013 La Route de France was an Elite Women's road race, rated at 2.1 by the UCI, which ran from 3 August to 10 August covering approximately 831.8 km. The race was won overall by Linda Villumsen of Wiggle–Honda, marking her first overall win for the new British based team. The race is also noted due to the record breaking efforts of Villumsen's teammate, Giorgia Bronzini who won six consecutive stages (1 – 6) breaking the all-time record for consecutive stage wins in a women's stage racing. The Wiggle–Honda team won all seven of the road stages, with Emma Johansson of Orica–AIS winning the prologue earlier in the race.

== Stages ==
=== Prologue ===
3 August 2013 – Soissons to Soissons, 3.8 km (2.4 mi)

Prologue result

	Rider	Team	Time
1	Emma Johansson (SWE)	Orica–AIS	5' 07"
2	Linda Villumsen (NZL)	Wiggle–Honda	+ 1"
3	Amy Pieters (NED)	Team Argos–Shimano	+ 2"
4	Evelyn Stevens (USA)	Velocio–SRAM Pro Cycling	+ 5"
5	Roxane Knetemann (NED)	Rabobank-Liv Giant	+ 6"

General classification after Prologue

	Rider	Team	Time
1	Emma Johansson (SWE)	Orica–AIS	5' 07"
2	Linda Villumsen (NZL)	Wiggle–Honda	+ 1"
3	Amy Pieters (NED)	Team Argos–Shimano	+ 2"
4	Evelyn Stevens (USA)	Velocio–SRAM Pro Cycling	+ 5"
5	Roxane Knetemann (NED)	Rabobank-Liv Giant	+ 6"

=== Stage 1 ===
4 August 2013 – Soissons to Enghien les Bains, 121 km (75.2 mi)

Stage 1 result

	Rider	Team	Time
1	Giorgia Bronzini (ITA)	Wiggle–Honda	3h 22' 00"
2	Valentina Scandolara (ITA)	MCipollini–Giordana	s.t.
3	Emma Johansson (SWE)	Orica–AIS	s.t.
4	Thalita de Jong (NED)	Rabobank-Liv Giant	s.t.
5	Amy Pieters (NED)	Team Argos–Shimano	s.t.

General classification after stage 1

	Rider	Team	Time
1	Emma Johansson (SWE)	Orica–AIS	3h 27' 07"
2	Linda Villumsen (NZL)	Wiggle–Honda	+ 1"
3	Amy Pieters (NED)	Team Argos–Shimano	+ 2"
4	Evelyn Stevens (USA)	Velocio–SRAM Pro Cycling	+ 5"
5	Roxane Knetemann (NED)	Rabobank-Liv Giant	+ 6"

=== Stage 2 ===
5 August 2013 – Enghien les Bains to Mantes la Jolie, 89 km (55.3 mi)

Stage 2 result

	Rider	Team	Time
1	Giorgia Bronzini (ITA)	Wiggle–Honda	2h 12' 10"
2	Ashleigh Moolman (RSA)	Lotto–Belisol Ladies	s.t.
3	Thalita de Jong (NED)	Rabobank-Liv Giant	s.t.
4	Chloe McConville (AUS)	Team Argos–Shimano	s.t.
5	Emma Johansson (SWE)	Orica–AIS	s.t.

General classification after stage 2

	Rider	Team	Time
1	Emma Johansson (SWE)	Orica–AIS	5h 39' 17"
2	Linda Villumsen (NZL)	Wiggle–Honda	+ 1"
3	Amy Pieters (NED)	Team Argos–Shimano	+ 2"
4	Evelyn Stevens (USA)	Velocio–SRAM Pro Cycling	+ 5"
5	Roxane Knetemann (NED)	Rabobank-Liv Giant	+ 6"

=== Stage 3 ===
6 August 2013 – Anet to Mamers, 123 km (76.4 mi)

Stage 3 result

	Rider	Team	Time
1	Giorgia Bronzini (ITA)	Wiggle–Honda	3h 22' 17"
2	Emma Johansson (SWE)	Orica–AIS	s.t.
3	Lizzie Armitstead (GBR)	Boels–Dolmans Cycling Team	s.t.
4	Pauline Ferrand-Prévot (FRA)	Rabobank-Liv Giant	s.t.
5	Pascale Jeuland (FRA)	Vienne Futuroscope	s.t.

General classification after stage 3

	Rider	Team	Time
1	Emma Johansson (SWE)	Orica–AIS	9h 01' 34"
2	Linda Villumsen (NZL)	Wiggle–Honda	+ 1"
3	Amy Pieters (NED)	Team Argos–Shimano	+ 2"
4	Evelyn Stevens (USA)	Velocio–SRAM Pro Cycling	+ 5"
5	Roxane Knetemann (NED)	Rabobank-Liv Giant	+ 6"

=== Stage 4 ===
7 August 2013 – Cloyes sur le Loir to Briare, 140 km (87.0 mi)

Stage 4 result

	Rider	Team	Time
1	Giorgia Bronzini (ITA)	Wiggle–Honda	3h 23' 44"
2	Melissa Hoskins (AUS)	Orica–AIS	s.t.
3	Roxane Fournier (FRA)		s.t.
4	Lizzie Armitstead (GBR)	Boels–Dolmans Cycling Team	s.t.
5	Pascale Jeuland (FRA)	Vienne Futuroscope	s.t.

General classification after stage 4

	Rider	Team	Time
1	Emma Johansson (SWE)	Orica–AIS	12h 25' 18"
2	Linda Villumsen (NZL)	Wiggle–Honda	+ 1"
3	Amy Pieters (NED)	Team Argos–Shimano	+ 2"
4	Evelyn Stevens (USA)	Velocio–SRAM Pro Cycling	+ 5"
5	Roxane Knetemann (NED)	Rabobank-Liv Giant	+ 6"

=== Stage 5 ===
8 August 2013 – Saint-Fargeau to Pouges les Eaux, 98 km (60.9 mi)

Stage 5 result

	Rider	Team	Time
1	Giorgia Bronzini (ITA)	Wiggle–Honda	
2	Emma Johansson (SWE)	Orica–AIS	s.t.
3	Pauline Ferrand-Prévot (FRA)	Rabobank-Liv Giant	s.t.
4	Pascale Jeuland (FRA)	Vienne Futuroscope	s.t.
5	Roxane Fournier (FRA)		s.t.

General classification after stage 5

	Rider	Team	Time
1	Emma Johansson (SWE)	Orica–AIS	14h 53' 06"
2	Linda Villumsen (NZL)	Wiggle–Honda	+ 1"
3	Amy Pieters (NED)	Team Argos–Shimano	+ 2"
4	Evelyn Stevens (USA)	Velocio–SRAM Pro Cycling	+ 5"
5	Roxane Knetemann (NED)	Rabobank-Liv Giant	+ 6"

=== Stage 6 ===
9 August 2013 – Pouges les Eaux to Vichy, 127 km (78.9 mi)

Stage 6 result

	Rider	Team	Time
1	Giorgia Bronzini (ITA)	Wiggle–Honda	3h 29' 04"
2	Lizzie Armitstead (GBR)	Boels–Dolmans Cycling Team	s.t.
3	Amy Pieters (NED)	Team Argos–Shimano	s.t.
4	Emma Johansson (SWE)	Orica–AIS	s.t.
5	Alena Amialiusik (BLR)	Be Pink	s.t.

General classification after stage 6

	Rider	Team	Time
1	Emma Johansson (SWE)	Orica–AIS	18h 22' 10"
2	Linda Villumsen (NZL)	Wiggle–Honda	+ 1"
3	Amy Pieters (NED)	Team Argos–Shimano	+ 2"
4	Evelyn Stevens (USA)	Velocio–SRAM Pro Cycling	+ 5"
5	Roxane Knetemann (NED)	Rabobank-Liv Giant	+ 6"

=== Stage 7 ===
10 August 2013 – Cusset to Chauffailles, 130 km (80.8 mi)

Stage 7 result

	Rider	Team	Time
1	Linda Villumsen (NZL)	Wiggle–Honda	3h 28' 12"
2	Lizzie Armitstead (GBR)	Boels–Dolmans Cycling Team	+ 5' 53"
3	Tatiana Guderzo (ITA)	MCipollini–Giordana	+ 5' 53"
4	Emma Johansson (SWE)	Orica–AIS	+ 5' 53"
5	Karol-Ann Canuel (CAN)	Vienne Futuroscope	+ 5' 53"

Final General classification after stage 7

	Rider	Team	Time
1	Linda Villumsen (NZL)	Wiggle–Honda	21h 50' 23"
2	Emma Johansson (SWE)	Orica–AIS	+ 5' 52"
3	Evelyn Stevens (USA)	Velocio–SRAM Pro Cycling	+ 5' 57"
4	Tatiana Guderzo (ITA)	MCipollini–Giordana	+ 6' 00"
5	Alena Amialiusik (BLR)	Be Pink	+ 6' 06"

== Classification leadership ==
Stage	Winner	General classification	Young rider classification	Team classification
P	Emma Johansson	Emma Johansson	Amy Pieters	Orica–AIS
1	Giorgia Bronzini	Emma Johansson	Amy Pieters	Wiggle–Honda
2	Giorgia Bronzini	Emma Johansson	Amy Pieters	Rabobank-Liv Giant
3	Giorgia Bronzini	Emma Johansson	Amy Pieters	Rabobank-Liv Giant
4	Giorgia Bronzini	Emma Johansson	Amy Pieters	Rabobank-Liv Giant
5	Giorgia Bronzini	Emma Johansson	Amy Pieters	Rabobank-Liv Giant
6	Giorgia Bronzini	Emma Johansson	Amy Pieters	Rabobank-Liv Giant
7	Linda Villumsen	Linda Villumsen	Pauline Ferrand-Prévot	MCipollini–Giordana
Final		Linda Villumsen	Pauline Ferrand-Prévot	MCipollini–Giordana
