= Linda Villumsen =

Danish cyclist

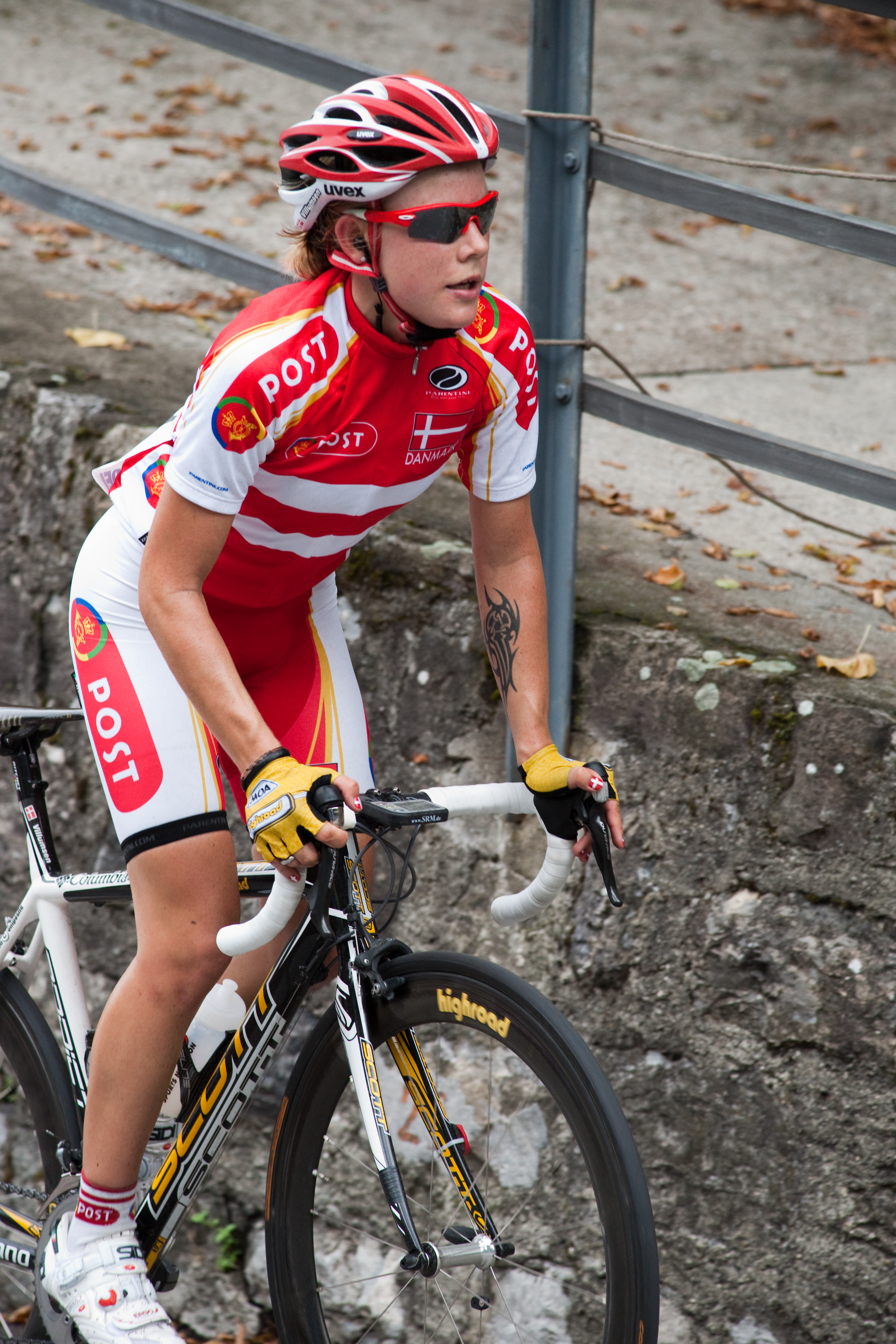
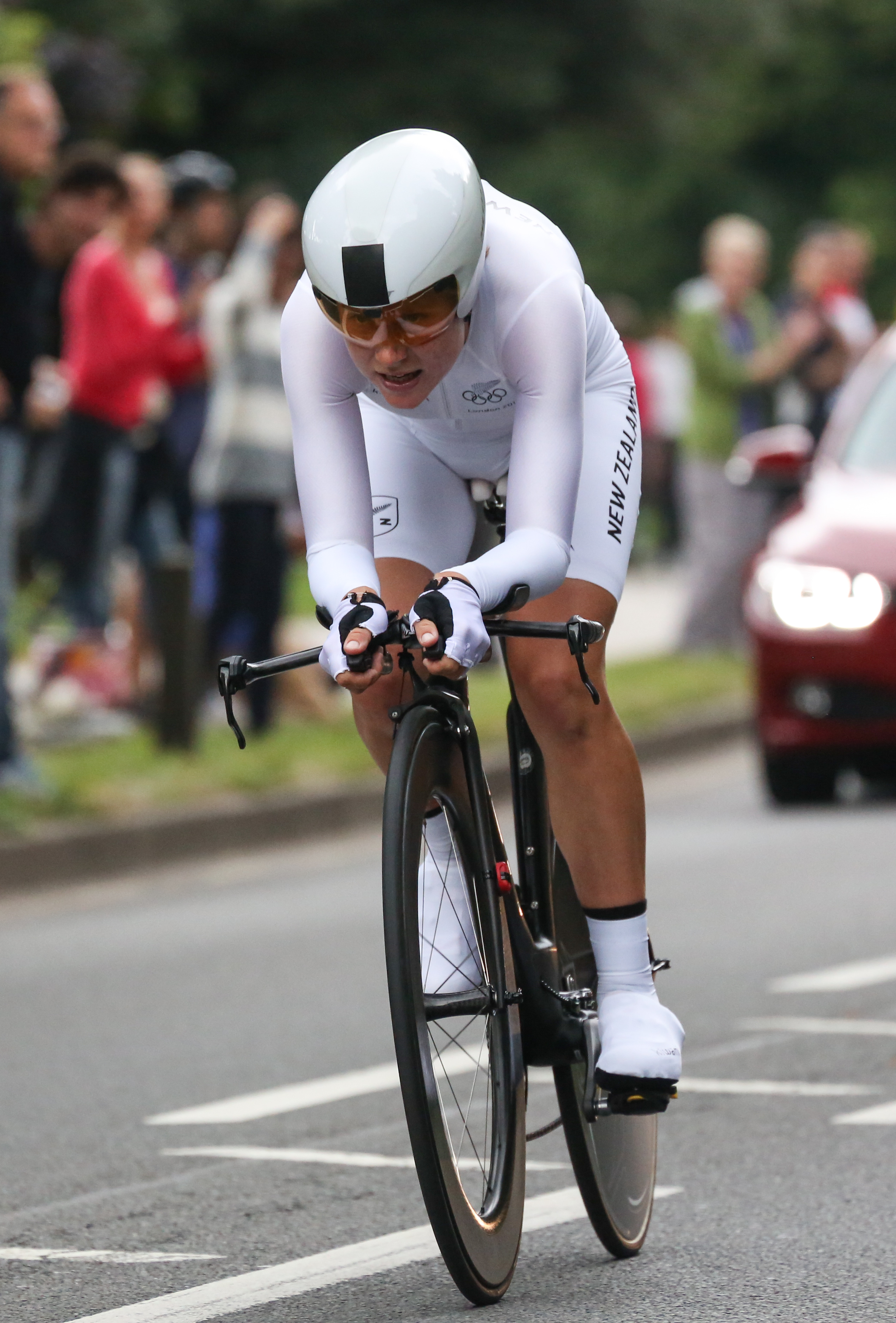
- Villumsen wearing the Danish national team's jersey at the 2009 UCI Road World Championships (left) and riding for New Zealand in the 2012 Olympics time trial (right)

Personal information
- Full name: Linda Melanie Villumsen Serup
- Born: 9 April 1985 (age 41) Herning, Denmark
- Height: 1.70 m (5 ft 7 in)
- Weight: 59 kg (130 lb)

Cycling career
- Sport: Cycling
- Discipline: Road
- Role: Rider
- Rider type: Time trialist; Climber

Amateur team
- 2017: F A S T Cycling Team

Professional teams
- 2005–2006: Buitenpoort - Flexpoint Team
- 2007–2010: Team T-Mobile Women
- 2011: AA Drink–leontien.nl
- 2012: Orica–AIS
- 2013–2014: Wiggle–Honda
- 2015–2016: UnitedHealthcare
- 2017–2018: Team VéloCONCEPT

Major wins
- One Day races · National Time Trial championships (2006, 2008, 2009, 2013) · National Road Race championships (2008–2009, 2015) · Commonwealth Games Time Trial championships (2014) · World Time Trial Championships (2015); Stage races · Route de France Féminine (2006, 2013) · Thüringen Rundfahrt der Frauen (2009) · Giro del Trentino Alto Adige-Südtirol (2012) · Tour Cycliste Féminin International de l'Ardèche (2014)
Medal record
Women's road cycling
World Championships
Representing Denmark
Bronze medal – third place	2009 Mendrisio	Time trial
Representing Orica–AIS
Silver medal – second place	2012 Valkenburg	Team time trial
Representing New Zealand
Gold medal – first place	2015 Richmond	Time trial
Silver medal – second place	2011 Copenhagen	Time trial
Silver medal – second place	2013 Tuscany	Time trial
Bronze medal – third place	2010 Melbourne	Time trial
Bronze medal – third place	2012 Valkenburg	Time trial
Commonwealth Games
Gold medal – first place	2014 Glasgow	Time trial
Silver medal – second place	2010 Delhi	Time trial
Silver medal – second place	2018 Gold Coast	Time trial

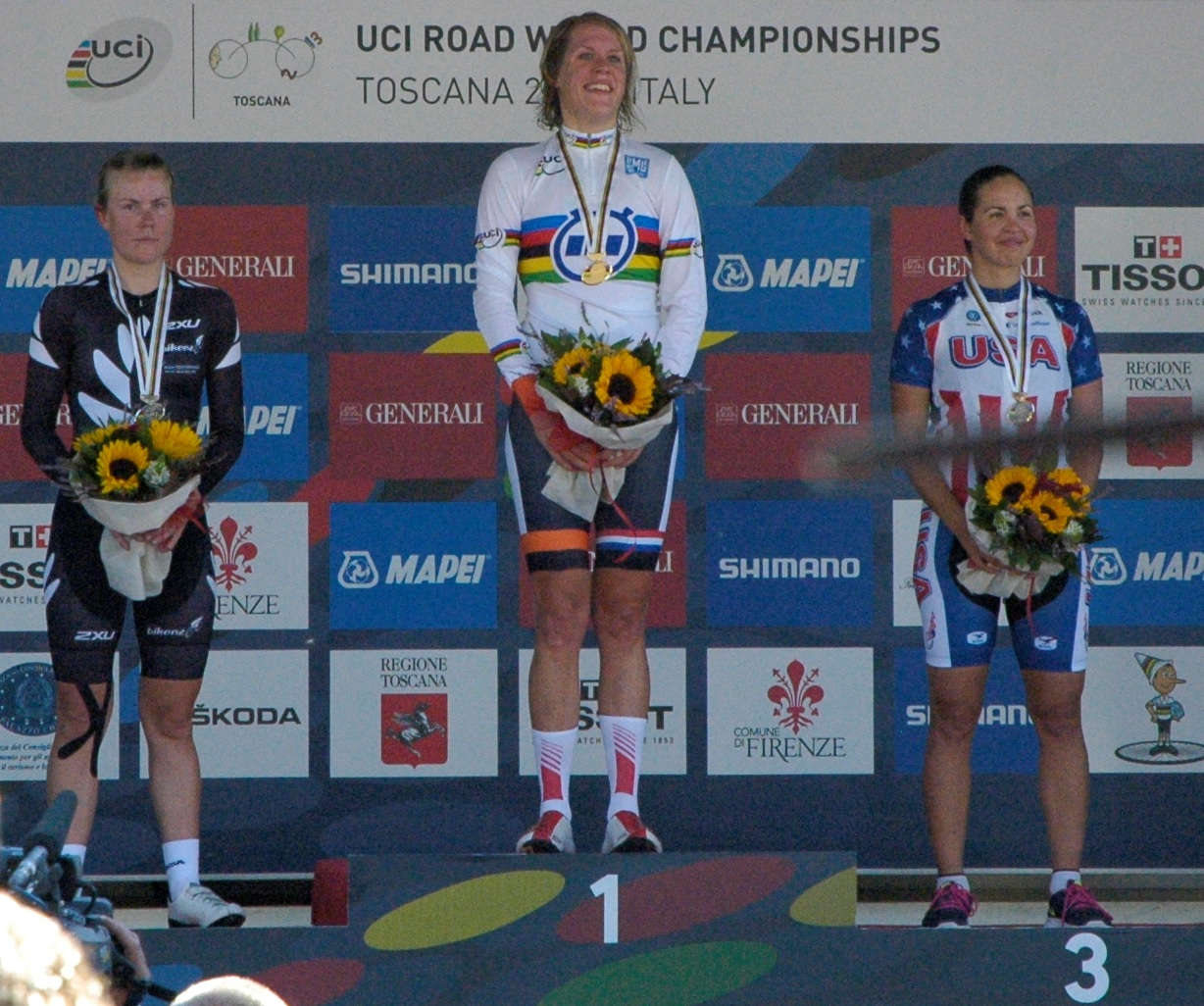
Villumsen (left) finished second in time trial at the 2013 World Championships. (Ellen van Dijk (center), Carmen Small (right))

Linda Melanie Villumsen Serup (born 9 April 1985) is a Danish-born road racing cyclist, who last rode for UCI Women's Team Team Virtu Cycling. Villumsen became a New Zealand citizen in 2009 and has ridden under a Kiwi licence from 2010.

== Career ==
Born in Herning, Villumsen won the European under 23 time trial championship in 2006 and 2007.

She was Danish national champion in both road racing and time trialing in 2006, 2008 and 2009. In 2006, Cycling World named her their Cyclist of the Year.

At the 2008 Summer Olympics in Beijing she finished 5th in the women's road race and 13th in the time trial.

At the 2012 Summer Olympics in London she finished 18th in the road race and fourth in the time trial, missing out on a medal by less than two seconds.

Villumsen won the Route de France Féminine in 2006 and 2013 and was one of only two riders to win the race twice.

From 2008 to 2015 she placed 10th, 3rd, 3rd, 2nd, 3rd, 2nd, 9th and 1st in world championships time trials.

From 2012 to 2014 she placed 7th, 6th and 8th in world championships road races.

At the 2014 Commonwealth Games she won the gold medal in the road time trial and placed 5th in the road race.

In September 2014 the UnitedHealthcare team announced that they had signed Villumsen for the 2015 season after two seasons with Wiggle–Honda.

In September 2015 Villumsen won the individual time trial at the UCI Road World Championships in Richmond, Virginia. Afterwards, her trade team, UnitedHealthcare, almost dropped her for riding her team issue New Zealand frame instead of her normal Wilier Cento Time Trial bike. The NZ team's bike, with its altered geometry, meant she could get much lower.

Villumsen is the only New Zealand senior cyclist to win an individual medal at the UCI Road World Championships.

== Major results ==
2005
1st Alblasserdam
Danish National Road Championships

2nd Road race
3rd Time trial

2nd Overall Damesronde van Drenthe
2nd New Zealand World Cup

2006
1st Time trial, UEC European Under-23 Road Championships
Danish National Road Championships

1st Time trial
1st Road race

1st Overall La Route de France
1st Omloop der Kempen
1st Mountains classification Damesronde van Drenthe
2nd Overall Ster Zeeuwsche Eilanden

1st Stage 1 (ITT)

2nd L'Heure d'Or Féminine
3rd Individual pursuit, Danish National Track Championships
9th Overall Holland Ladies Tour

1st Young rider classification

2007
1st Time trial, UEC European Under-23 Road Championships
1st Stage 6 Tour de l'Aude Cycliste Féminin
3rd Overall Holland Ladies Tour
5th Overall Emakumeen Bira
10th Overall Giro d'Italia Femminile

2008
Danish National Road Championships

1st Time trial
1st Road race

1st Stage 1 (TTT) Giro della Toscana Int. Femminile – Memorial Michela Fanini
2nd Open de Suède Vårgårda TTT
5th Road race, Olympic Games
8th Overall Iurreta-Emakumeen Bira
9th Overall Tour de l'Aude Cycliste Féminin
10th UCI Road World Championships – Women's time trial

2009
Danish National Road Championships

1st Time trial
1st Road race

1st Overall Thüringen Rundfahrt der Frauen

1st Stage 3

1st Trofeo Costa Etrusca – GP Comuni Santa Luce – Castellina Marittima
2nd Open de Suède Vårgårda TTT
3rd UCI Road World Championships – Women's time trial
3rd Overall Ster Zeeuwsche Eilanden

1st Stage 1 (ITT)

7th Overall Holland Ladies Tour
8th Overall Gracia–Orlová
8th Tour de Berne
10th Overall Tour de l'Aude Cycliste Féminin

1st Prologue

2010
2nd Time trial, Commonwealth Games
New Zealand National Road Championships

2nd Road race
3rd Time trial

2nd Chrono Gatineau
2nd Open de Suède Vårgårda TTT
3rd UCI Road World Championships – Women's time trial
5th Grand Prix Cycliste de Gatineau
6th Overall Women's Tour of New Zealand

2011
2nd UCI Road World Championships – Women's time trial
2nd Open de Suède Vårgårda TTT
4th Overall Thüringen Rundfahrt der Frauen
9th GP Ciudad de Valladolid

2012
1st Overall Giro del Trentino Alto Adige-Südtirol

1st Stage 2b (ITT)

1st Stage 3 (ITT) Emakumeen Euskal Bira
UCI Road World Championships

2nd Team time trial
3rd UCI Road World Championships – Women's time trial
7th Road race

2nd Open de Suède Vårgårda TTT
3rd La Flèche Wallonne Féminine
3rd GP Stad Roeselare
4th Time trial, Olympic Games
5th Overall Grand Prix Elsy Jacobs
7th Overall Women's Tour of New Zealand

1st Stage 5

8th Overall Holland Ladies Tour
10th Open de Suède Vårgårda

2013
1st Time trial, New Zealand National Road Championships
1st Overall La Route de France

1st Stage 7

2nd UCI Road World Championships – Women's time trial
5th Overall Thüringen Rundfahrt der Frauen
6th UCI Road World Championships – Women's road race
8th Overall Tour Cycliste Féminin International de l'Ardèche

1st Active rider classification
1st Mountains classification
1st Combination classification
1st Prologue

2014
Commonwealth Games

1st Time trial
5th Road race

1st Overall Tour Cycliste Féminin International de l'Ardèche

1st Stage 2 (ITT)

New Zealand National Road Championships

2nd Time trial
2nd Road race

8th La Flèche Wallonne Féminine
8th UCI Road World Championships – Women's road race
9th UCI Road World Championships – Women's time trial

2015
1st UCI Road World Championships – Women's time trial
New Zealand National Road Championships

1st Road race
2nd Time trial

5th Overall Tour of the Gila
7th Overall Joe Martin Stage Race

2016
1st Le Race
2nd Overall Joe Martin Stage Race

1st Prologue

5th Overall Tour of the Gila
6th Time trial, Olympic Games

2017
5th Overall Holland Ladies Tour
6th UCI Road World Championships – Women's time trial

2018
2nd Time trial, Commonwealth Games
10th Overall Women's Herald Sun Tour

Sporting positions
Preceded by Madeleine Sandig (GER)	European Under-23 Time Trial; Champion; 2006–2007	Succeeded by Ellen van Dijk (NED)
Preceded by Lisa Brennauer (GER)	UCI World Time Trial; Champion; 2015	Succeeded by Amber Neben (USA)
