= Omloop van het Hageland =

Belgian one-day road cycling race

Race details
- Date: March
- Region: Belgium
- Discipline: Road
- Web site: www.omloophageland.be

History
- First edition: 2005
- Editions: 21 (as of 2026)
- First winner: Ludivine Henrion (BEL)
- Most wins: Marta Bastianelli (ITA) (3 wins)
- Most recent: Charlotte Kool (NED)

The Omloop van het Hageland is an elite women's professional road bicycle race held since 2007 in the Hageland area of Belgium. Originally a 1.2 rated race by the UCI, it is now a 1.1 category race. Before 2011 the race was a criterium of category 1.NE and was called Tielt-Winge (Wielertrofee Vlaanderen).

The race route is usually flat with a few stretches of cobbles and the repeated ascent of the Roeselberg. The race can be won by sprinters and breakaway groups.

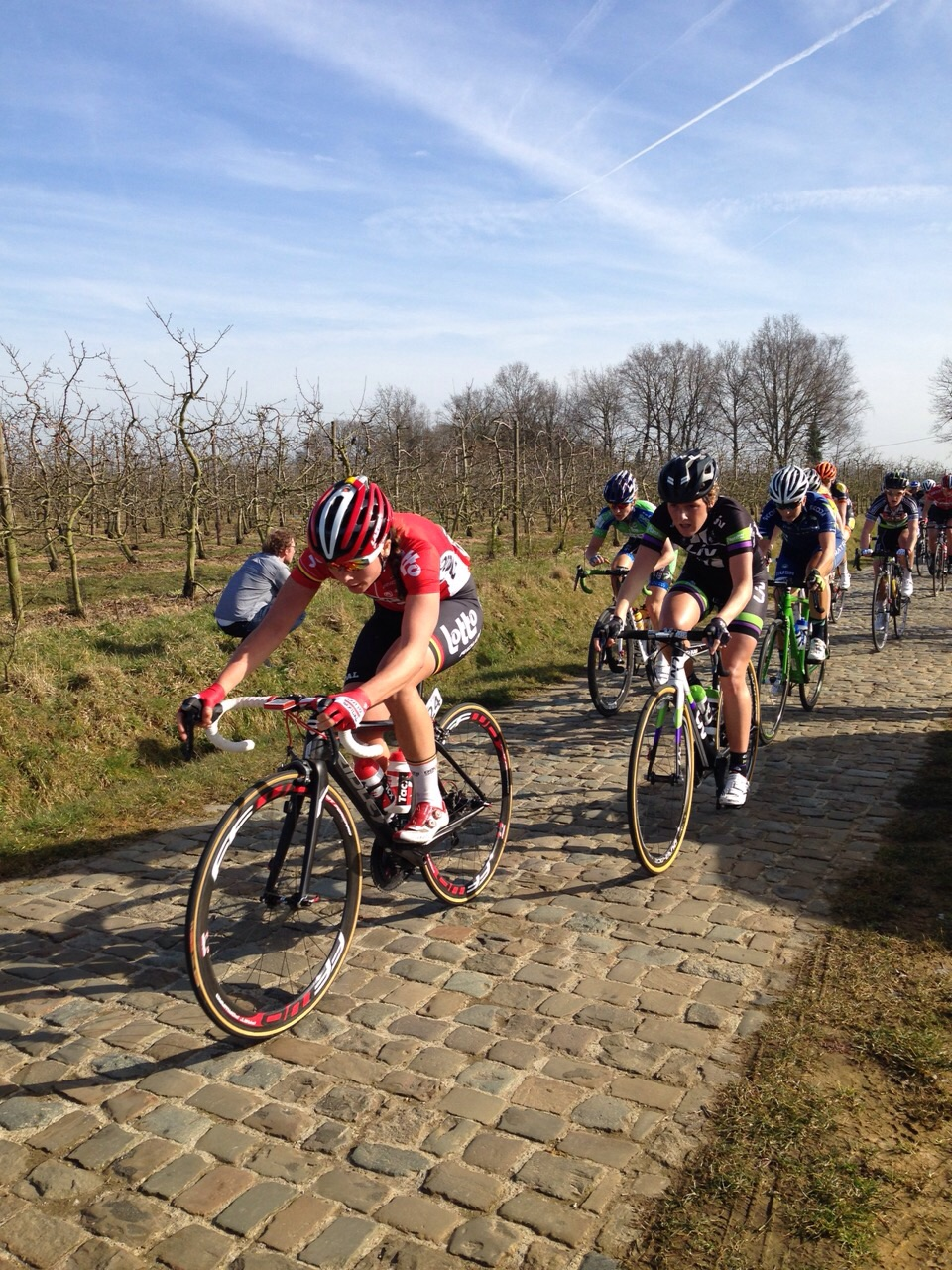
Cobblestone section in 2015 Omloop van het Hageland

== Past winners ==
Year	Country	Rider	Team
2005	Belgium	Ludivine Henrion	
2006	Belgium	Ilse Geldhof	
2007	Ireland	Louise Moriarty	
2008	Belgium	Liesbet De Vocht	
2009	Netherlands	Andrea Bosman	
2010	Sweden	Emma Johansson	
2011	Sweden	Emma Johansson	
2012	Great Britain	Lizzie Armitstead	AA Drink–leontien.nl
2013	New Zealand	Emily Collins	Wiggle–Honda
2014	Great Britain	Lizzie Armitstead	Boels–Dolmans
2015	Belgium	Jolien D'Hoore	Wiggle–Honda
2016	Italy	Marta Bastianelli	Alé–Cipollini
2017	Belgium	Jolien D'Hoore	Wiggle High5
2018	Netherlands	Ellen van Dijk	Team Sunweb
2019	Italy	Marta Bastianelli	Team Virtu Cycling
2020	Netherlands	Lorena Wiebes	Parkhotel Valkenburg
2022	Italy	Marta Bastianelli	UAE Team ADQ
2023	Netherlands	Lorena Wiebes	SD Worx
2024	United States	Kristen Faulkner	EF Education-Cannondale
2025	Netherlands	Femke Gerritse	Team SD Worx–Protime
2026	Netherlands	Charlotte Kool	Fenix–Premier Tech
