= Heather Fischer =

American cyclist

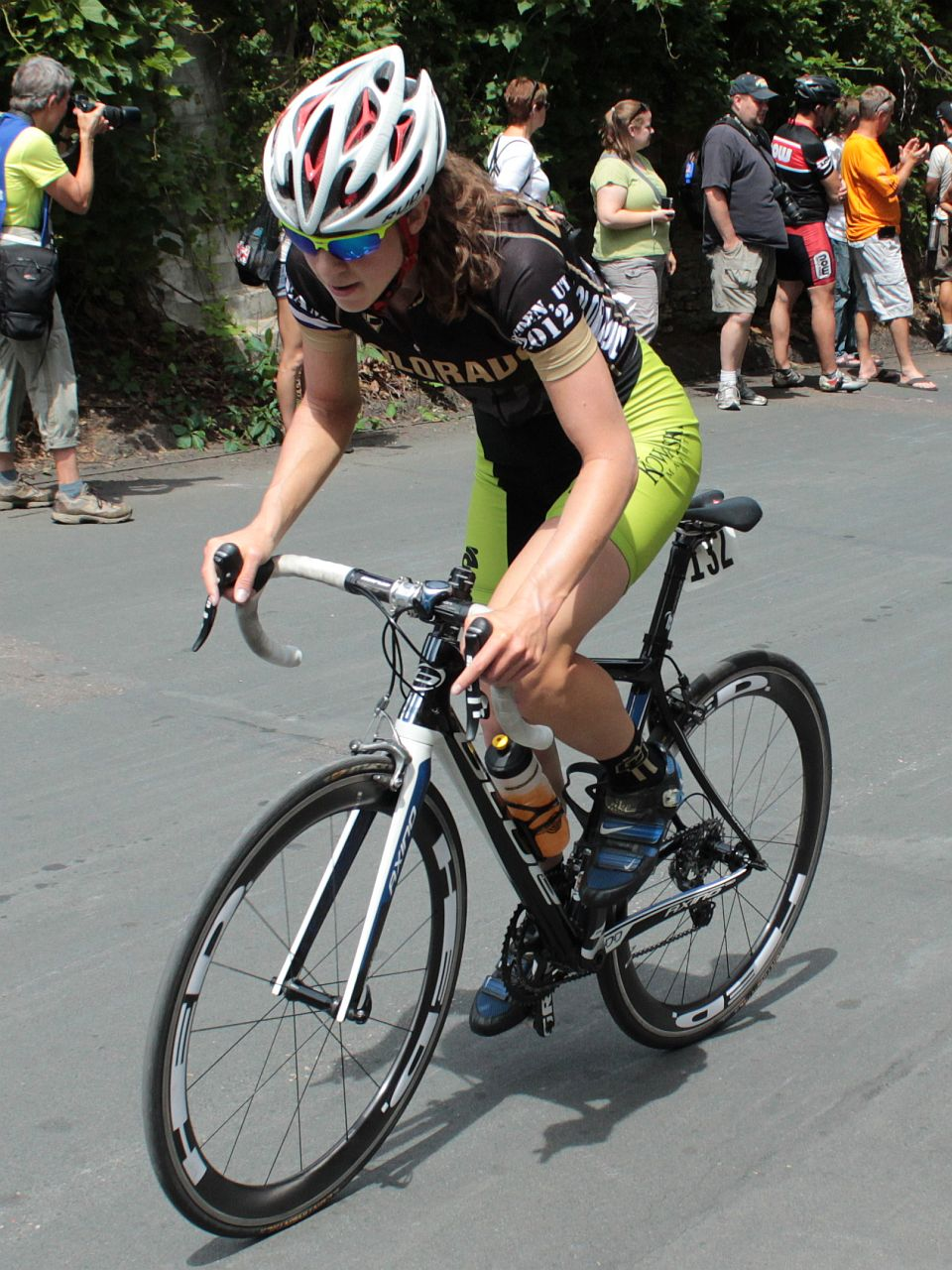
- Fischer in 2012

Personal information
- Full name: Heather Fischer
- Born: November 28, 1988 (age 37)

Cycling career
- Sport: Cycling
- Current team: Team Féminin Le Boulou
- Discipline: Road
- Role: Rider

Amateur teams
- 2012: University of Colorado
- 2014: DNA Cycling p/b K4
- 2019: DNA Pro Cycling
- 2022–: Team Féminin Le Boulou

Professional teams
- 2013: Exergy Twenty16
- 2015: Matrix Fitness Pro Cycling
- 2016: Rally Cycling
- 2017: Tibco–Silicon Valley Bank
- 2020–2021: DNA Pro Cycling

Heather Fischer (born November 28, 1988) is an American racing cyclist, who currently rides for French amateur team Féminin Le Boulou.

== Major results ==
2015
5th Acht van Westerveld
9th Grand Prix cycliste de Gatineau
2016
Tour of the Gila

1st Sprints classification
1st Stage 4

4th Winston-Salem Cycling Classic
6th Philadelphia Cycling Classic
10th Overall Joe Martin Stage Race

== See also ==
- List of 2016 UCI Women's Teams and riders
