= 2015 Omloop van het Hageland =

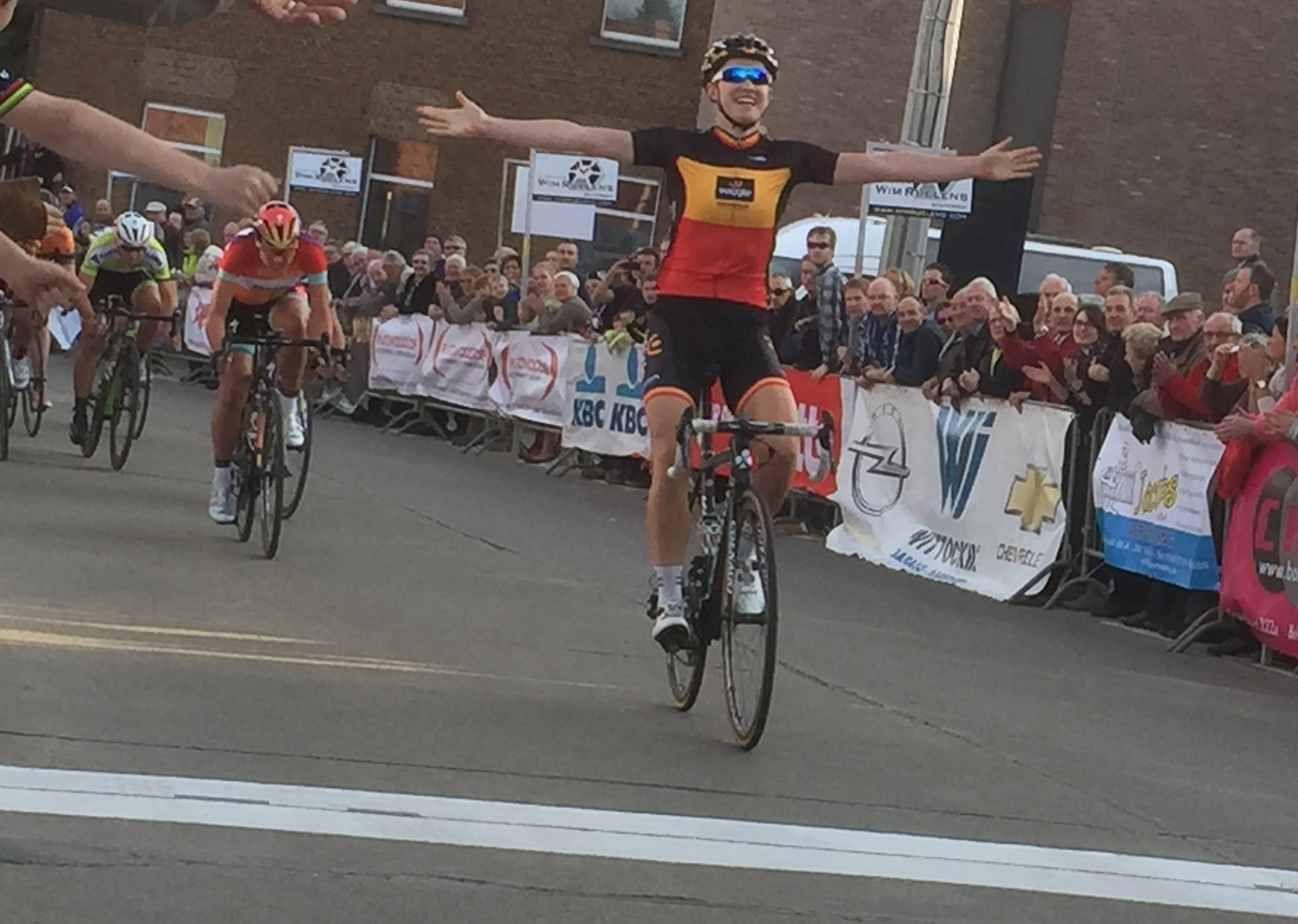
- Final sprint

Race details
- Dates: 8 March 2015
- Distance: 120.1 km (74.6 mi)
- Winning time: 3h 03' 16"

Results
	Winner	Jolien D'Hoore (BEL)	(Wiggle–Honda)
	Second	Chantal Blaak (NED)	(Boels–Dolmans)
	Third	Sara Mustonen-Lichan (SWE)	(Team Liv–Plantur)

The 2015 Omloop van het Hageland was the eleventh running of the Omloop van het Hageland, a women's bicycle race in Belgium. It was held on 8 March 2015, over a distance of 120.1 kilometres (74.6 miles) around Tielt-Winge. It was rated by the UCI as a 1.2 category race. The race was won by Belgian rider Jolien D'Hoore of the Wiggle–Honda team, who won the sprint from a front group of eleven riders.

== Preview ==
Several UCI Women's Teams like Velocio–SRAM, Orica–AIS and Rabobank-Liv Woman Cycling Team did not participate because they rode the Strade Bianche in Italy the day before. A main favourite Ellen van Dijk (Boels–Dolmans) could not start due to a back injury – as the team did not have any reserves following Strade Bianche, Larissa Havik competed as a guest rider for the team, so the team had the fewest riders to start.

== Results ==
Result
Rank	Rider	Team	Time
1	Jolien D'Hoore (BEL)	Wiggle–Honda	3h 03' 16"
2	Chantal Blaak (NED)	Boels–Dolmans	+ 0"
3	Sara Mustonen-Lichan (SWE)	Team Liv–Plantur	+ 0"
4	Coryn Rivera (USA)	UnitedHealthcare	+ 0"
5	Janneke Ensing (NED)	Parkhotel Valkenburg Continental Team	+ 0"
6	Sheyla Gutiérrez (ESP)	Lointek	+ 0"
7	Lauren Kitchen (AUS)	Team Hitec Products	+ 0"
8	Amy Pieters (NED)	Team Liv–Plantur	+ 0"
9	Chloe Hosking (AUS)	Wiggle–Honda	+ 0"
10	Tatiana Guderzo (ITA)	Team Hitec Products	+ 6"

== See also ==
- 2015 in women's road cycling
