= 2010 UCI Road World Championships – Women's time trial =

Women's time trial
2010 UCI Road World Championships
- Rainbow jersey

Race details
- Dates: September 29, 2010
- Stages: 1
- Distance: 22.8 km (14.2 mi)
- Winning time: 32' 48"

Medalists
	Gold	Emma Pooley (GBR)
	Silver	Judith Arndt (GER)
	Bronze	Linda Villumsen (NZL)

The Women's time trial of the 2010 UCI Road World Championships cycling event took place on 29 September in Melbourne, Australia.

Emma Pooley became Great Britain's first gold medal winner in the discipline, recording a time 15 seconds quicker than Germany's Judith Arndt – finishing second for the third time – with New Zealand's Linda Villumsen finishing marginally behind Arndt in third, taking her second consecutive third place in the time trial.

== Route ==
The course covered 22.8 km.

== Final classification ==
Rank	Rider	Country	Time
1	Emma Pooley	United Kingdom	32' 48"
2	Judith Arndt	Germany	+ 15"
3	Linda Villumsen	New Zealand	+ 16"
4	Amber Neben	United States	+ 38"
5	Jeannie Longo	France	+ 44"
6	Evelyn Stevens	United States	+ 1' 00"
7	Tara Whitten	Canada	+ 1' 06"
8	Shara Gillow	Australia	+ 1' 13"
9	Emilia Fahlin	Sweden	+ 1' 22"
10	Tatiana Guderzo	Italy	+ 1' 26"
11	Emma Johansson	Sweden	+ 1' 34"
12	Noemi Cantele	Italy	+ 1' 41"
13	Patricia Schwager	Switzerland	+ 1' 51"
14	Charlotte Becker	Germany	+ 1' 54"
15	Anne Samplonius	Canada	+ 1' 55"
16	Melissa Holt	New Zealand	+ 2' 05"
17	Tatiana Antoshina	Russia	+ 2' 16"
18	Vicki Whitelaw	Australia	+ 2' 19"
19	Alex Rhodes	Australia	+ 2' 24"
20	Olga Zabelinskaya	Russia	+ 2' 30"
21	Regina Bruins	Netherlands	+ 3' 00"
22	Grace Verbeke	Belgium	+ 3' 01"
23	Kataržina Sosna	Lithuania	+ 3' 01"
24	Verónica Leal Balderas	Mexico	+ 3' 18"
25	Svitlana Halyuk	Ukraine	+ 3' 23"
26	Chanpeng Nontasin	Thailand	+ 3' 39"
27	Tatiana Panina	Belarus	+ 4' 02"
28	Valeria Teresita Müller	Argentina	+ 4' 07"
29	Lesya Kalytovska	Ukraine	+ 4' 24"
30	Doris Schweizer	Switzerland	+ 4' 28"
31	Monrudee Chapookam	Thailand	+ 5' 12"
32	Rosa Maria Bravo Soba	Spain	+ 5' 26"
33	Yelena Antonova	Kazakhstan	+ 5' 41"
34	Belén López Morales	Spain	+ 5' 58"
35	Kimberley Yap	Malaysia	+ 5' 59"
36	Mariana Mohammad	Malaysia	+ 6' 46"
37	Kathryn Bertine	Saint Kitts and Nevis	+ 6' 53"
38	Dinah Chan	Singapore	+ 7' 24"
