= 2015 Acht van Westerveld =

Race details
- Dates: 12 March 2015
- Distance: 138.2 km (85.9 mi)
- Winning time: 3h 39' 31"

Results
	Winner	Giorgia Bronzini (ITA)	(Wiggle–Honda)
	Second	Valentina Scandolara (ITA)	(Orica–AIS)
	Third	Annemiek van Vleuten (NED)	(Bigla Pro Cycling Team)

The 2015 Molecaten Drentse Acht van Westerveld was the 9th running of the Acht van Westerveld, a women's bicycle race in the Netherlands starting and finishing in Dwingeloo. It was rated by the UCI as a 1.2 category race.

== Results ==
Result
Rank	Rider	Team	Time
1	Giorgia Bronzini (ITA)	Wiggle–Honda	3h 39' 31"
2	Valentina Scandolara (ITA)	Orica–AIS	+ 0"
3	Annemiek van Vleuten (NED)	Bigla Pro Cycling Team	+ 0"
4	Emilie Moberg (NOR)	Team Hitec Products	+ 0"
5	Heather Fischer (USA)	United States (national team)	+ 4"
6	Willeke Knol (NED)	Team Liv–Plantur	+ 5"
7	Loren Rowney (AUS)	Velocio–SRAM	+ 5"
8	Alice Maria Arzuffi (ITA)	Inpa Sottoli Giusfredi	+ 23"
9	Amalie Dideriksen (DEN)	Boels–Dolmans	+ 1' 45"
10	Amy Pieters (NED)	Team Liv–Plantur	+ 1' 45"

== See also ==
- 2015 in women's road cycling
