= La Route de France =

Women's cycle race

Race details
- Date: Early or mid-August
- Region: France
- Discipline: Road race
- Type: Stage race
- Organiser: Organisation Routes et Cycles

History
- First edition: 2006
- Editions: 10
- Final edition: 2016
- First winner: Linda Villumsen
- Most wins: Linda Villumsen (2 wins); Amber Neben (2 wins)
- Final winner: Amber Neben (2016)

The Route de France Féminine was a women's cycle race.

First held in 2006, it was rated 2.2 by the UCI for the 2006 and 2007 edition, and 2.1 since. The race was cancelled in 2011, but returned the next year.

With the ending of the Grande Boucle Féminine Internationale after 2009, and the Tour de l'Aude Cycliste Féminin after 2010, the Route de France Féminine became the only major women's stage race held in France. The race ended in 2016. Giorgia Bronzini is the most successful stage winner with 10 stage wins.

== Podium ==
Year	First	Second	Third
2006	Linda Melanie Villumsen (DEN)	Amber Neben (USA)	Svetlana Bubnenkova (RUS)
2007	Amber Neben (USA)	Svetlana Bubnenkova (RUS)	Maryline Salvetat (FRA)
2008	Luise Keller (GER)	Rosane Kirch (BRA)	Edwige Pitel (FRA)
2009	Kimberly Anderson (USA)	Evelyn Stevens (USA)	Eneritz Iturriagaechevarria Mazaga (ESP)
2010	Annemiek van Vleuten (NED)	Judith Arndt (GER)	Olga Zabelinskaya (RUS)
2011	Race not held		
2012	Evelyn Stevens (USA)	Kristin McGrath (USA)	Carlee Taylor (AUS)
2013	Linda Melanie Villumsen (NZL)	Emma Johansson (SWE)	Evelyn Stevens (USA)
2014	Claudia Lichtenberg (GER)	Alena Amialiusik (BLR)	Aude Biannic (FRA)
2015	Elisa Longo Borghini (ITA)	Amber Neben (USA)	Claudia Lichtenberg (GER)
2016	Amber Neben (USA)	Tayler Wiles (USA)	Eugenia Bujak (POL)
