= Janel Holcomb =

American cyclist (born 1978)

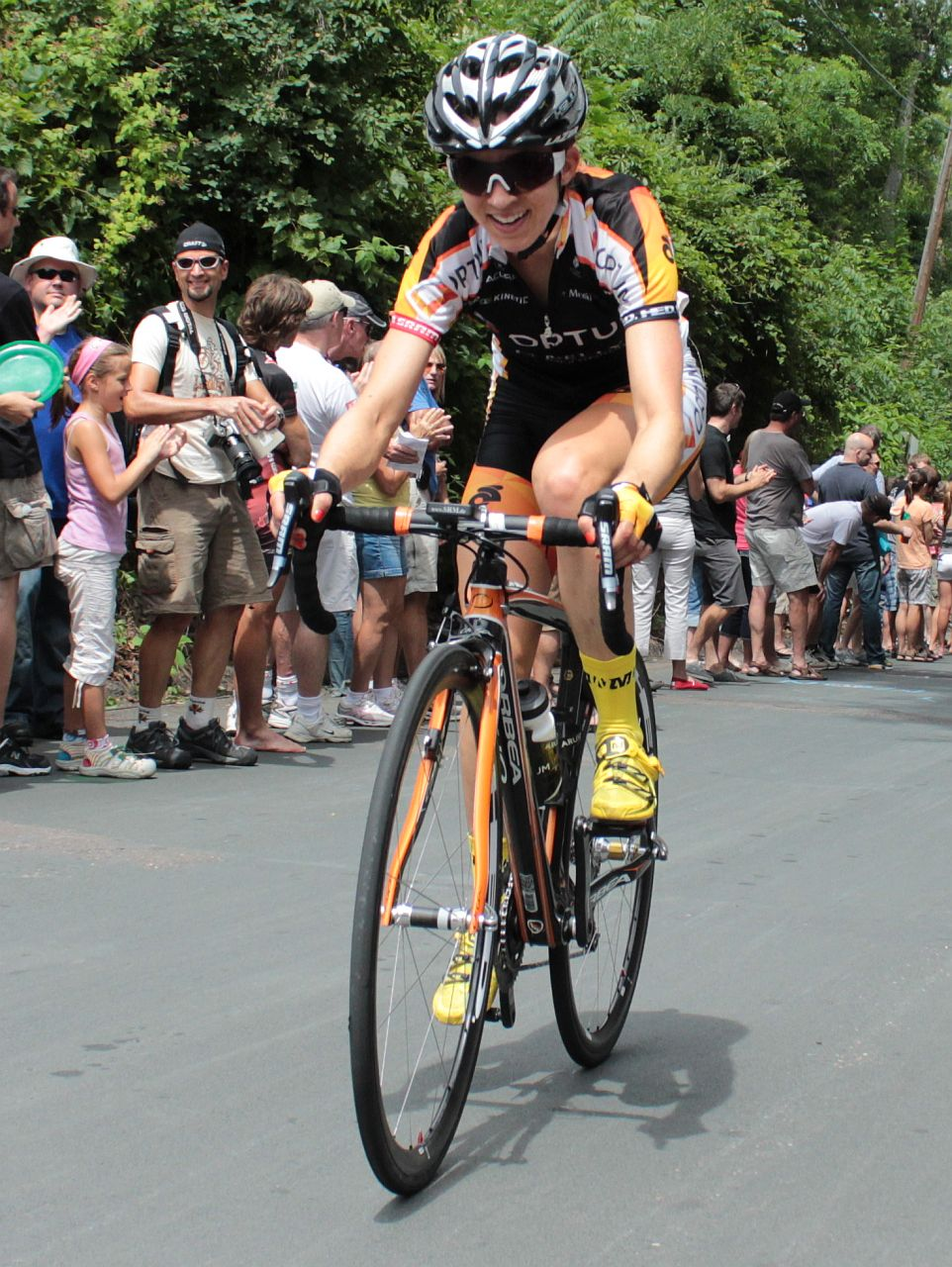
- Holcomb at the 2012 Nature Valley Grand Prix

Personal information
- Born: December 2, 1978 (age 47) Chicago, IL, United States

Cycling career
- Sport: Cycling
- Role: Rider

Janel Holcomb (born December 2, 1978) is an American racing cyclist. She competed in the 2013 UCI women's team time trial in Florence.
