= 2009 UCI Road World Championships =

Cycling world championships

- Venue: Mendrisio, Switzerland
- Date: 23–27 September 2009
- Coordinates: 45°52′0″N 8°59′0″E
- Nations participating: 60
- Events: 6

The 2009 UCI Road World Championships were held in Mendrisio, Switzerland, between September 23 and September 27, 2009. The event consisted of a road race and a time trial for men, women and men under 23.

== Schedule ==
=== Individual time trials ===
Wednesday 23 September 2009

- 09:30 - 12:45 Men U23, 33.2 km
- 14:00 - 17:15 Women, 26.8 km

Thursday 24 September 2009

- 11:30 - 17:00 Men Elite, 49.8 km

=== Road race ===
Saturday 26 September 2009

- 09:00 - 12:30 Women, 124.2 km
- 13:30 - 18:00 Men U23, 179.4 km

Sunday 27 September 2009

- 10:30 - 17:30 Men Elite, 262.2 km

== Participating nations ==
Cyclists from 60 national federations participated. The number of cyclists per nation that competed is shown in parentheses.

Participating nations
Click on a nation to go to the nations' UCI Road World Championships page
- Albania (1)
- Andorra (1)
- Argentina (5)
- Australia
- Austria
- Belarus
- Belgium
- Brazil
- Canada
- Chile (1)
- Colombia
- Costa Rica
- Croatia (6)
- Czech Republic (1)
- Denmark
- Dominican Republic
- Ecuador (1)
- Eritrea
- Estonia
- Finland (3)
- France
- Germany
- Great Britain
- Greece
- Hungary
- Indonesia (1)
- Iran (1)
- Ireland
- Israel (2)
- Italy
- Japan
- Kazakhstan
- Kyrgyzstan (1)
- Latvia
- Lithuania
- Luxembourg
- Mexico
- Moldova (1)
- Namibia (2)
- Netherlands (19)
- New Zealand
- Norway
- Poland
- Portugal
- Romania (2)
- Russia
- Saint Kitts and Nevis (4)
- Serbia
- Slovakia
- Slovenia
- South Africa
- Spain
- Sweden
- Switzerland
- Thailand
- Turkey
- Ukraine
- United States
- Uruguay (1)
- Venezuela

== Events summary ==
Event	Gold		Silver		Bronze	
Men's Events
Men's road race	Cadel Evans; Australia	6h 56' 26"	Alexandr Kolobnev; Russia	+ 27"	Joaquim Rodríguez; Spain	s.t.
Men's time trial	Fabian Cancellara; Switzerland	57' 55.74"	Gustav Larsson; Sweden	+ 1' 27.13"	Tony Martin; Germany	+ 2' 30.18"
Women's Events
Women's road race	Tatiana Guderzo; Italy	3h 33' 25"	Marianne Vos; Netherlands	+ 19"	Noemi Cantele; Italy	s.t.
Women's time trial	Kristin Armstrong; United States	35' 26.09"	Noemi Cantele; Italy	+ 55.01"	Linda Villumsen; Denmark	+ 58.25"
Men's Under-23 Events
Men's under-23 road race	Romain Sicard; France	4h 41' 54"	Carlos Betancur; Colombia	+ 27"	Egor Silin; Russia	s.t.
Men's under-23 time trial	Jack Bobridge; Australia	40' 44.79"	Nelson Oliveira; Portugal	+ 18.73"	Patrick Gretsch; Germany	+ 27.66"

== Medal table ==
Place	Nation	1st place, gold medalist(s)	2nd place, silver medalist(s)	3rd place, bronze medalist(s)	Total
1	Australia	2	0	0	2
2	Italy	1	1	1	3
3	France	1	0	0	1
3	Switzerland	1	0	0	1
3	United States	1	0	0	1
6	Russia	0	1	1	2
7	Colombia	0	1	0	1
7	Netherlands	0	1	0	1
7	Portugal	0	1	0	1
7	Sweden	0	1	0	1
11	Germany	0	0	2	2
12	Denmark	0	0	1	1
12	Spain	0	0	1	1
Total		6	6	6	18
