= Cycling World =

Cycling Sport Publication

- Categories: Cycling
- Frequency: Monthly
- Publisher: CPL Media
- Country: United Kingdom
- Language: English
- ISSN: 0143-0238

Cycling World magazine was first published in 1976. A consumer focused monthly magazine for the cycling enthusiast promoting cycling as a leisure pursuit for all. In July 2015 David Robert became the editor of the magazine. It is published by Cpl Media.
