= Tatiana Guderzo =

Italian cyclist (born 1984)

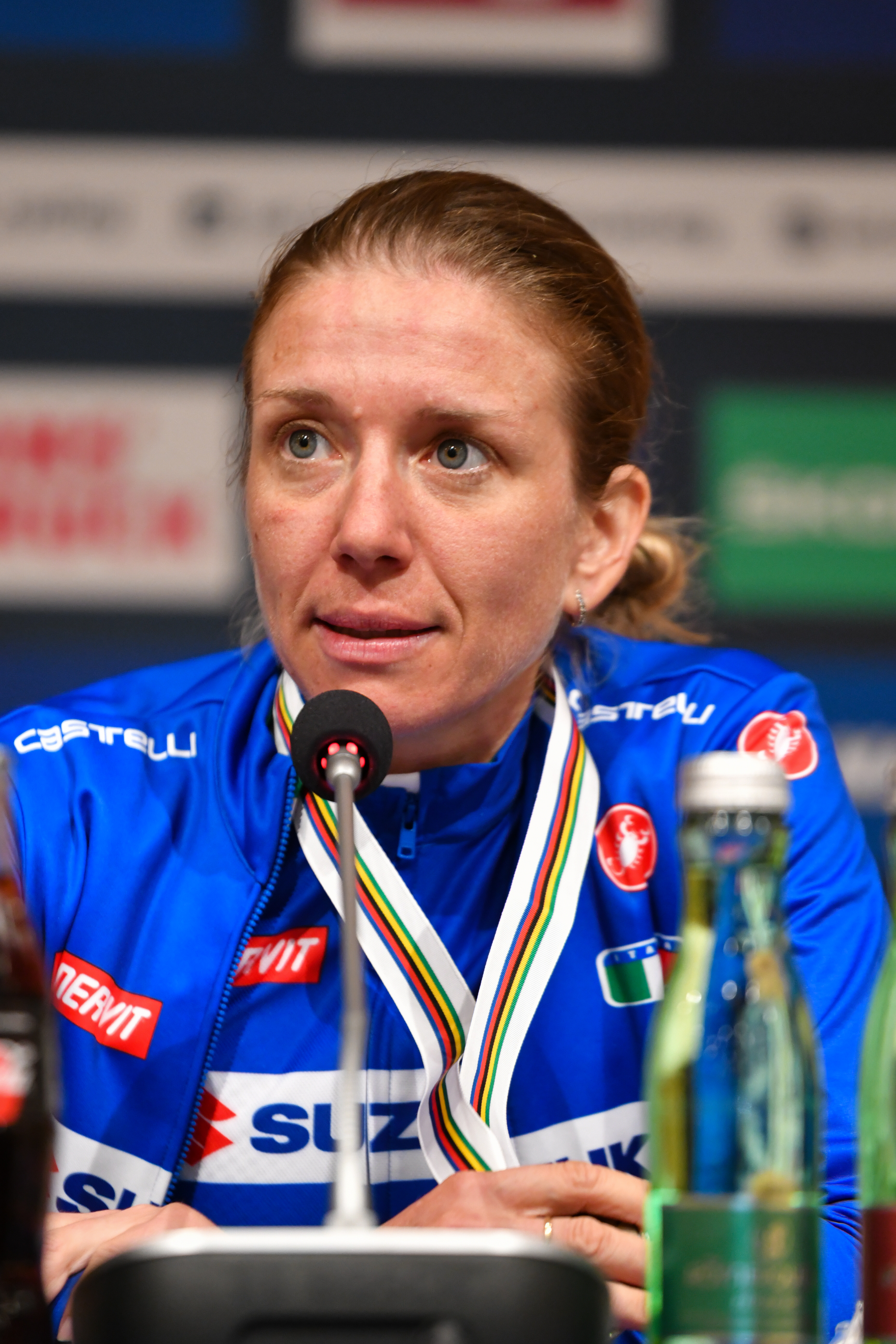
- Guderzo in 2018

Personal information
- Full name: Tatiana Guderzo
- Born: 22 August 1984 (age 42) Marostica, Italy
- Height: 5 ft 3 in (160 cm)
- Weight: 119 lb (54 kg)

Cycling career
- Sport: Cycling
- Current team: Top Girls Fassa Bortolo
- Disciplines: Road; Track
- Role: Rider

Amateur team
- 2008–: Fiamme Azzurre

Professional teams
- 2005–2006: Top Girls Fassa Bortolo Hausbrandt Caffé
- 2007: AA-Drink Cycling Team
- 2008–2009: Gauss RDZ Ormu
- 2010: Team Valdarno Umbria
- 2011–2014: Mcipollini–Giordana
- 2015–2016: Team Hitec Products
- 2017: Lensworld–Kuota
- 2018: Hitec Products–Birk Sport
- 2018–2019: Bepink
- 2020–2021: Alé BTC Ljubljana
- 2022–: Top Girls Fassa Bortolo

Major wins
- World Road Race Championships (2009); National Time Trial Championships (2005, 2008, 2010, 2012, 2013)
Medal record
Women's road bicycle racing
Representing Italy
Olympic Games
| Bronze medal – third place | 2008 Beijing | Road race |
World Championships
| Gold medal – first place | 2009 Mendrisio | Road race |
| Silver medal – second place | 2004 Verona | Road race |
| Bronze medal – third place | 2018 Innsbruck | Road race |
Women's track cycling
World Championships
| Bronze medal – third place | 2018 Apeldoorn | Team pursuit |
European Championships
| Gold medal – first place | 2016 Yvelines | Team pursuit |

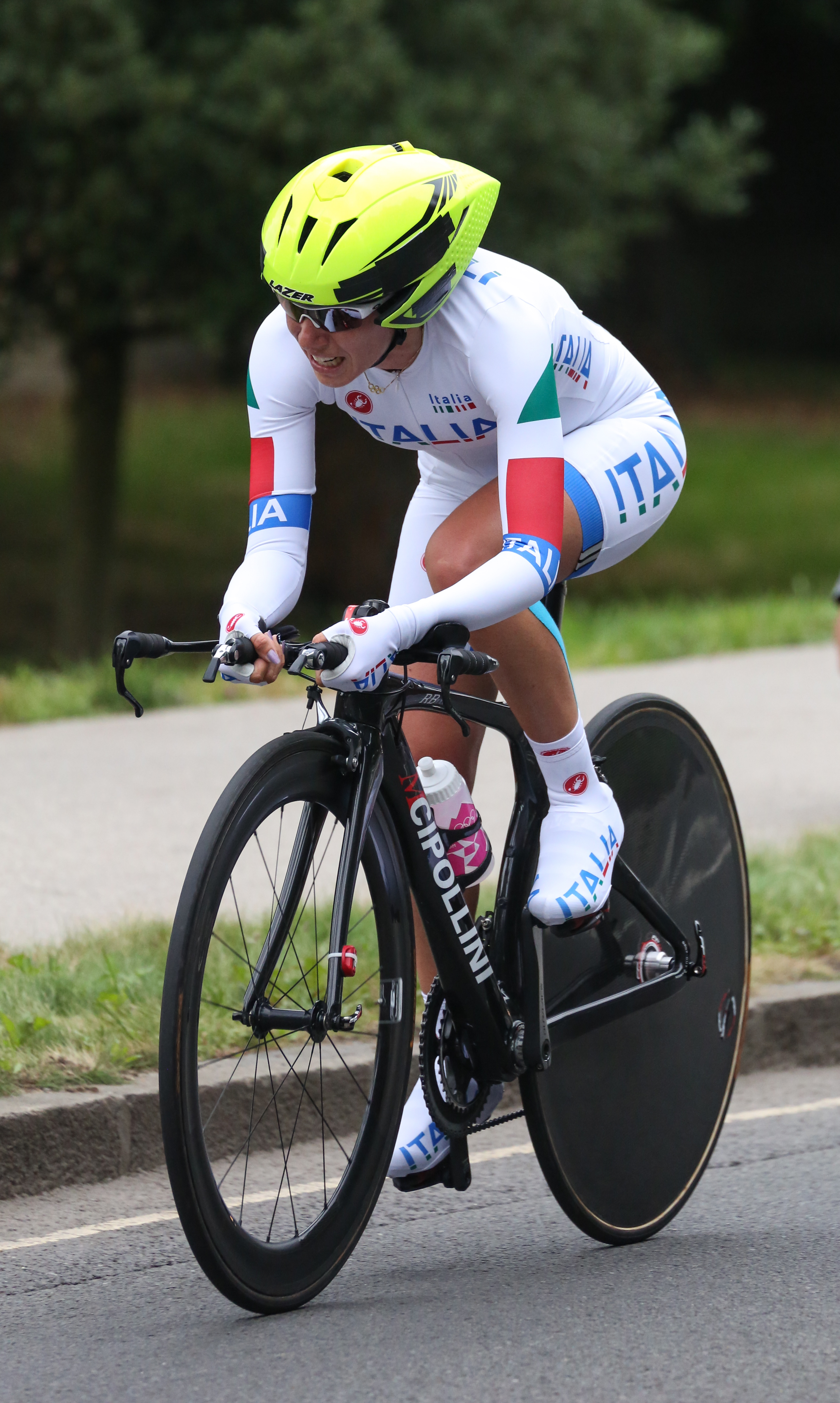
Tatiana Guderzo competing in the 2012 Olympics time trial in London.

Tatiana Guderzo (born 22 August 1984) is an Italian professional cyclist, who currently rides for UCI Women's Continental Team Top Girls Fassa Bortolo.

She won the world road race championship on 26 September 2009 at Mendrisio, Switzerland and a bronze medal in the road race at the 2008 Summer Olympics.

== Major results ==
=== Road ===
2002
2nd Time trial, UCI Junior Road World Championships
2004
1st Time trial, UEC European Under-23 Road Championships
1st Overall Eko Tour Dookola Polski

1st Stage 5

UCI Road World Championships

2nd Road race
10th UCI Road World Championships – Women's time trial

2nd Time trial, National Road Championships
2005
1st Time trial, National Road Championships
2nd Time trial, UEC European Under-23 Road Championships
3rd Overall Giro di San Marino
3rd GP Castilla y León
5th Trofeo Alfredo Binda-Comune di Cittiglio
7th Tour de Berne
2006
UEC European Under-23 Road Championships

2nd Time trial
2nd Road race

2nd Overall Tour Cycliste Féminin International de l'Ardèche
3rd Time trial, National Road Championships
4th Overall Emakumeen Bira

1st Stage 2

4th Overall Holland Ladies Tour
7th Overall Giro d'Italia Femminile
9th Overall Gracia–Orlová
10th Trofeo Alfredo Binda-Comune di Cittiglio
2007
1st Westkerke Criterium
5th Overall Giro d'Italia Femminile
8th Durango-Durango Emakumeen Saria
9th Open de Suède Vårgårda
10th GP Stad Roeselare
2008
National Road Championships

1st Time trial
2nd Road race

2nd Overall Iurreta-Emakumeen Bira

1st Mountains classification

2nd Züri-Metzgete
3rd Road race, Olympic Games
4th Overall Giro d'Italia Femminile
4th Overall Giro della Toscana Int. Femminile – Memorial Michela Fanini
2009
1st Road race, UCI Road World Championships
2nd Time trial, National Road Championships
5th Overall Giro della Toscana Int. Femminile – Memorial Michela Fanini

1st Stage 3

5th Memorial Davide Fardelli
7th Overall Giro d'Italia Femminile
8th Overall Tour Féminin en Limousin
2010
1st Time trial, National Road Championships
3rd Overall Giro d'Italia Femminile
5th Overall Giro della Toscana Int. Femminile – Memorial Michela Fanini
7th La Flèche Wallonne Féminine
7th Memorial Davide Fardelli
9th Trofeo Alfredo Binda-Comune di Cittiglio
10th UCI Road World Championships – Women's time trial
2011
National Road Championships

2nd Road race
3rd Time trial

3rd Overall Giro del Trentino Alto Adige-Südtirol
4th Overall Giro d'Italia Femminile
6th Overall Giro della Toscana Int. Femminile – Memorial Michela Fanini
8th Grand Prix Elsy Jacobs
9th La Flèche Wallonne Féminine
2012
1st Time trial, National Road Championships
2nd Overall Vuelta a El Salvador
2nd Grand Prix el Salvador
2nd Trofeo Alfredo Binda-Comune di Cittiglio
4th Grand Prix GSB
5th Overall Trophée d'Or Féminin
7th Overall Giro d'Italia Femminile
2013
1st Time trial, National Road Championships
1st Stage 7 Thüringen Rundfahrt der Frauen
2nd Overall Giro del Trentino Alto Adige-Südtirol
2nd Overall Giro d'Italia Femminile
4th Overall La Route de France
4th Overall Holland Ladies Tour
7th Road race, UCI Road World Championships

1st Stage 6

2014
5th Overall Giro della Toscana Int. Femminile – Memorial Michela Fanini
7th Overall Holland Ladies Tour
2015
2nd Time trial, National Road Championships
4th Overall Tour of Zhoushan Island

1st Stage 1

8th Overall Ladies Tour of Norway
10th Omloop van het Hageland
2016
2nd Time trial, National Road Championships
6th Overall Giro d'Italia Femminile
6th Holland Hills Classic
10th Giro dell'Emilia Internazionale Donne Elite
2017
1st Giro dell'Emilia Internazionale Donne Elite
10th Giro del Trentino Alto Adige-Südtirol
2018
3rd Road race, UCI Road World Championships
4th Giro dell'Emilia Internazionale Donne Elite
2019
3rd La Classique Morbihan
8th Overall Tour Cycliste Féminin International de l'Ardèche
8th Emakumeen Nafarroako Klasikoa
2020
7th Giro dell'Emilia Internazionale Donne Elite
2021
National Road Championships

2nd Road race
3rd Time trial

3rd Donostia San Sebastián Klasikoa
8th Overall Giro Rosa

=== Track ===
2006
3rd Individual pursuit, UEC European Under-23 Track Championships
2007
1st Individual pursuit, National Track Championships
2011
National Track Championships

1st Scratch
2nd Team pursuit
3rd Individual pursuit

2014
National Track Championships

1st Team pursuit
2nd Individual pursuit
3rd Omnium

3rd Team pursuit, UEC European Track Championships
2017
1st Team pursuit, European Track Championships
