= Anna-Bianca Schnitzmeier =

German cyclist

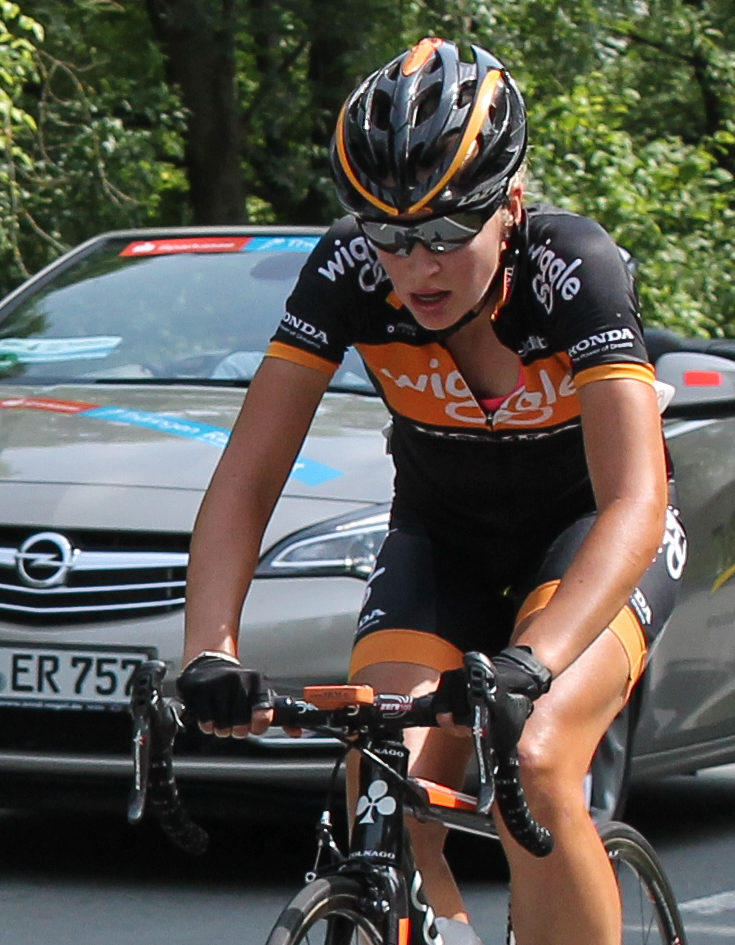

Personal information
- Full name: Anna-Bianca Schnitzmeier
- Born: 27 July 1990 (age 36) Dortmund, West Germany

Cycling career
- Sport: Cycling
- Discipline: Road
- Role: Rider

Professional teams
- 2011–2012: Abus Nutrixxion
- 2013–2014: Wiggle–Honda

Anna-Bianca Schnitzmeier (born 27 July 1990) is a German former professional racing cyclist.

== Palmares ==
2008
2nd Rhede Criterium
2009
3rd Wellinghofen Criterium
2012
8th European U23 Road Championship

2013 – Wiggle-Honda 2013 season

2014 – Wiggle-Honda 2014 season
