= 2013 Omloop van het Hageland =

Race details
- Dates: 3 March 2013
- Stages: 1
- Distance: 122.3 km (75.99 mi)
- Winning time: 3h 19' 18"

Results
| | Winner | Emily Collins (New Zealand) | (Wiggle–Honda) |
| | Second | Shelley Olds (United States) | (Team TIBCO–To The Top) |
| | Third | Emma Johansson (Sweden) | (Orica–AIS) |

The 2013 Omloop van het Hageland was the ninth running of the women's Omloop van het Hageland, a women's bicycle race in Belgium. It was held on 3 March 2013 over a distance of 122.3 kilometres (76.0 miles) around Tielt-Winge. The race ran in one line of 55.3 kilometres (34.4 miles), followed by 5 local laps of 13.4 kilometres (8.3 miles) each. It was rated by the UCI as a 1.2 category race. The race was part of the 2013 Lotto Cycling Cup.

== Results ==
| | Cyclist | Team | Time |
|---|---|---|---|
| 1 | Emily Collins (NZL) | Wiggle–Honda | 3h 19' 18" |
| 2 | Shelley Olds (USA) | Team TIBCO–To The Top | s.t. |
| 3 | Emma Johansson (SWE) | Orica–AIS | s.t. |
| 4 | Daniela Gass (GER) | Scappatella | s.t. |
| 5 | Adrie Visser (NED) | Dolmans-Boels Cycling Team | s.t. |
| 6 | Ellen van Dijk (NED) | Specialized–lululemon | s.t. |
| 7 | Kelly Druyts (BEL) | Topsport Vlaanderen–Bioracer | s.t. |
| 8 | Christine Majerus (LUX) | Sengers Ladies Cycling Team | s.t. |
| 9 | Elisa Longo Borghini (ITA) | Hitec Products–Mistral Home | s.t. |
| 10 | Trixi Worrack (GER) | Specialized–lululemon | s.t. |

s.t. = same time
