= Chloe McConville =

Australian cyclist (born 1987)

Personal information
- Born: 1 October 1987 (age 39) Myrtleford, Victoria, Australia

Cycling career
- Sport: Cycling
- Current team: Liv AlUla Jayco
- Discipline: Road
- Role: Rider

Professional team
- 2015-: Orica–AIS

Chloe McConville (born 1 October 1987) is an Australian professional racing cyclist. She rides for the Orica–AIS team. Before becoming a cyclist, McConville was a cross-country skier, racing for the Australian national team from 2002 to 2009, and competed at the 2006 FIS Nordic Junior World Ski Championships and the 2007 Winter Universiade. She originally took up cycling at the age of twenty as a form of cross-training. She has a bachelor's degree in physiotherapy from the University of Melbourne.

== See also ==
- List of 2015 UCI Women's Teams and riders
