= Emily Collins =

New Zealand cyclist (born 1990)

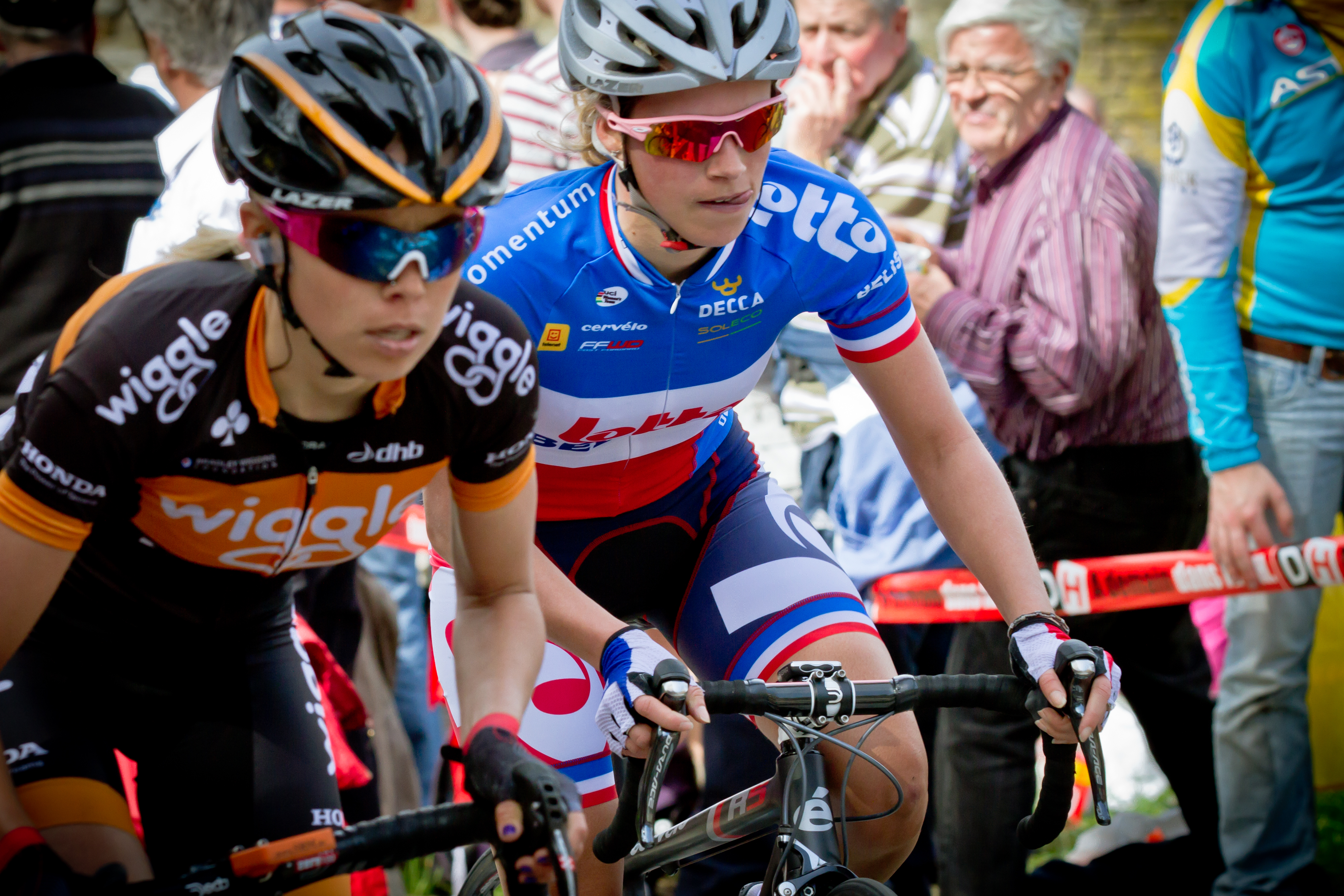
- Collins (left) at the 2013 La Flèche Wallonne Féminine

Personal information
- Full name: Emily Collins
- Born: 16 September 1990 (age 36) Auckland, New Zealand

Cycling career
- Sport: Cycling
- Current team: Retired
- Discipline: Road
- Role: Rider

Amateur teams
- 2009–2010: Team Cyclosport
- 2010: Swabo Ladies
- 2011–2012: Vanderkitten Racing
- 2012: Boretti Ulysses Ladies Cycling Team

Professional teams
- 2013–2014: Wiggle–Honda
- 2015–2016: Team TIBCO–SVB

Emily Collins (born 16 September 1990) is a New Zealand former professional racing cyclist. She competed in the 2013 UCI women's road race in Florence.

== Major results ==
2011
5th Road race, National Road Championships
5th Overall Women's Tour of New Zealand
2012
5th Overall Belgium Tour
2013
National Road Championships

1st Criterium
10th Road race

1st Omloop van het Hageland
10th Le Samyn des Dames
10th Sparkassen Giro Bochum
2014
4th Road race, National Road Championships
4th Diamond Tour
9th Road race, Oceania Road Championships
2015
3rd Overall Armed Forces Association Cycling Classic
4th Road race, National Road Championships
5th Grand Prix Cycliste de Gatineau
10th Overall Bay Classic Series
2016
5th Road race, National Road Championships
9th Overall Santos Women's Tour
9th Overall Joe Martin Stage Race
