= 2008 in women's road cycling =

== UCI Road World Rankings ==
Top-ranked individual	Second-ranked individual	Third-ranked individual	Top-ranked team	Top-ranked nation
Marianne Vos (NED); DSB Bank Ladies Cycling-Team	Judith Arndt (GER); Team Columbia Women	Ina Teutenberg (GER); Team Columbia Women	Team Columbia Women	Germany

== World Championships ==
Race	Date	Winner	Second	Third
World Championship Time Trial	September	Amber Neben (USA)	Christiane Soeder (AUT)	Judith Arndt (GER)
World Championship Road Race	September	Nicole Cooke (GBR)	Marianne Vos (NED)	Judith Arndt (GER)

== Olympic Games ==
Race	Date	Winner	Second	Third
(International Olympic Committee) Olympic Games Road Race	August 10	Nicole Cooke (GBR)	Emma Johansson (SWE)	Tatiana Guderzo (ITA)
(International Olympic Committee) Olympic Games Time Trial	August 13	Kristin Armstrong (USA)	Emma Pooley (GBR)	Karin Thürig (SUI)

== UCI World Cup ==
	Date	Race	Country	Winner	Team
#1	24 February	Geelong World Cup	Australia	Katheryn Mattis (USA)	Webcor Builders Cycling Team
#2	24 March	Trofeo Alfredo Binda-Comune di Cittiglio	Italy	Emma Pooley (GBR)	Team Specialized Designs for Women
#3	6 April	Tour of Flanders for Women	Belgium	Judith Arndt (GER)	Team High Road Women
#4	12 April	Ronde van Drenthe	Netherlands	Chantal Beltman (NED)	Team High Road Women
#5	23 April	La Flèche Wallonne Féminine	Belgium	Marianne Vos (NED)	DSB Bank Ladies Cycling-Team
#6	4 May	Tour de Berne	Switzerland	Susanne Ljungskog (SWE)	Menikini–Selle Italia
#7	31 May	Coupe du Monde Cycliste Féminine de Montréal	Canada	Judith Arndt (GER)	Team High Road Women
#8	30 July	Open de Suède Vårgårda	Sweden	Kori Kelley Seehafer (USA)	Menikini–Selle Italia
#9	1 August	Open de Suède Vårgårda TTT	Sweden	Priska Doppmann (SUI); Karin Thürig (SUI); Christiane Soeder (AUT); Carla Ryan (AUS)	Cervélo–Lifeforce Pro Cycling Team
#10	24 August	GP de Plouay – Bretagne	France	Fabiana Luperini (ITA)	Menikini–Selle Italia
#11	16 September	Rund um die Nürnberger Altstadt	Germany	Judith Arndt (GER)	Team Columbia Women

== Single day races (1.1 and 1.2) ==
Race	Date	Cat.
(Brazil) Copa América de Ciclismo	January 6	1.2
(Switzerland) Gran Premio Brissag Lago Maggiore	March 8	1.2
(Italy) GP Comune di Cornaredo	March 9	1.2
(Belgium) Omloop Het Volk / Circuit Het Volk	March 16	1.2
(Italy) GP Cosat Etrusca-Giro dei comuni Montescudaio-Riparbella	March 29	1.2
(Poland) Klasyczny-Naleczow	March 30	1.2
(Italy) GP Costa Etrusca-Giro dei comuni Castellina M.MA-Santa Luce	March 30	1.2
(Belgium) Grand Prix de Dottignies	April 7	1.2
(Netherlands) Drentse 8 van Dwingeloo	April 10	1.1
(Netherlands) Novilon Eurocup Ronde van Drenthe	April 13	1.1
(Netherlands) Ronde van Gelderland	April 19	1.2
(Spain) Trofeo Ciudad de Sevilla	April 20	1.2
(China) Tour of Chongming Island Time Trial	April 25	1.2
(Italy) GP Liberazione	April 25	1.2
(Netherlands) Omloop van Borsele	April 26	1.2
(Luxembourg) Grand Prix Elsy Jacobs	April 26	1.2
(Belgium) GP Stad Roeselare	April 27	1.2
(Switzerland) Grand Prix de Suisse / Souvenir Magali Pache	May 2	1.1
(Poland) Majowy Wyscig Klasyczny - Lublin	May 3	1.2
(Venezuela) Clasico Aniversario de la Federacion Venezolana de Ciclismo	May 3	1.2
(Venezuela) Copa Federacion Venezolana de Ciclismo, Corre Por La Vida	May 4	1.2
(El Salvador) Grand Prix de Santa Ana	May 15	1.1
(United States) Tour de Leelanau	May 25	1.2
(Netherlands) Omloop Door Middag-Humsterland	June 7	1.2
(Netherlands) Therme kasseienomloop	June 8	1.2
(United States) Commerce Bank Liberty Classic	June 8	1.1
(Italy) GP Carnevale d'Europa	July 19	1.2
(Germany) Sparkassen Giro	August 3	1.1
(Netherlands) Holland Hills Classic	August 10	1.2
(Switzerland) Züri-Metzgete	September 7	1.1
(Italy) Memorial Davide Fardelli - Cronometro Individuale	September 7	1.2
(France) Chrono Champenois - Trophée Européen	September 14	1.1
Grand Prix de France	September 28	1.2
(France) Chrono des Nations Les Herbiers Vendée	October 19	1.1

== Stage races (2.1 and 2.2) ==
Race	Date	Cat.
(Australia) Geelong Tour	February 21–22	2.2
Women's Tour of New Zealand	February 27 – March 2	2.2
(Poland) Wyscig Etapowy – Zamosc	April 11–13	2.2
(China) Tour of Chongming Island	April 26–29	2.2
(Czech Republic) Gracia–Orlová	May 1–4	2.2
(United States) Mt. Hood Cycling Classic	May 13–18	2.2
(France) Tour de l'Aude Cycliste Féminin	May 16-25	2.2
Vuelta Ciclista Femenina a El Salvador	May 16-21	2.2
(Poland) Tour de Pologne Feminin	May 22–24	2.2
(El Salvador) Vuelta a Occidente	May 23–25	2.2
(Canada) Tour du Grand Montréal	June 2–5	2.1
(Canada) Tour de Pei	June 8–12	2.2
(Spain) Iurreta-Emakumeen Bira	June 12–15	2.1
(France) Grande Boucle Féminine Internationale	June 17–22	2.2
(Netherlands) Rabo Ster Zeeuwsche Eilanden	June 19–21	2.2
(Italy) Giro del Trentino Alto Adige-Südtirol	June 20–22	2.1
(Italy) Giro d'Italia Femminile	July 5–13	2.1
(Czech Republic) Tour de Feminin – Krásná Lípa	July 10–13	2.2
(France) Tour de Bretagne Féminin	July 17–20	2.2
(Germany) International Thüringen Rundfahrt der Frauen	July 22–27	2.1
(France) Tour Féminin en Limousin	July 24–27	2.2
Route de France Féminine	August 10–17	2.1
(Germany) Albstadt-Frauen-Etappenrennen	August 22–24	2.2
(France) Trophée d'Or Féminin	August 26–30	2.2
(Netherlands) Holland Ladies Tour	September 2–7	2.2
(France) Tour Cycliste Féminin International Ardèche	September 9–13	2.2
(Italy) Giro della Toscana Int. Femminile – Memorial Michela Fanini	September 16–21	2.1

== Continental Championships ==
=== African Championship ===
Race	Date	Winner	Second	Third
Individual time trial	November 9, 2007	Lynette Burger (RSA)	Yolandi Du Toit (RSA)	Aurelie Halbwachs (MRI)
Road race	November 11, 2007	Marissa van der Merwe (RSA)	Lynette Burger (RSA)	Yolandi Du Toit (RSA)

=== Asian Championships ===
Race	Date	Winner	Second	Third
Individual time trial	September 14	Li Meifang (CHN)	Liu Yongli (CHN)	Mayuko Hagiwara (JPN)
Road race	September 15	Gao Min (CHN)	Miho Oki (JPN)	Choi Hye-Kyeong (KOR)

=== European Championships (under-23) ===
Race	Date	Winner	Second	Third
Time trial (under-23)	July 3	Ellen van Dijk (NED)	Svitlana Halyuk (UKR)	Lesya Kalytovska (UKR)
Road race (under-23)	July 5	Rasa Leleivytė (LTU)	Lesya Kalytovska (UKR)	Marta Bastianelli (ITA)

=== Oceania Championships ===
Race	Date	Winner	Second	Third
Individual time trial	14 November 2007	Bridie O'Donnell (AUS)	Dale Tye (NZL)	Rachel Mercer (NZL)
Road race	18 November 2007	Rochelle Gilmore (AUS)	Joanne Kiesanowski (NZL)	Emma Crum (NZL)

=== Pan-American Championships ===
Race	Date	Winner	Second	Third
Individual time trial	May 9	Ana Paola Madriñan Villegas (COL)	Giuseppina Grassi Herrera (MEX)	Kori Kelley-Seehafer (USA)
Road race	May 11	Yumari González (CUB)	Karelia Judith Machado Jaimes (VEN)	Belem Guerrero Méndez (MEX)

== See also ==
- 2008 in men's road cycling
- 2008 in track cycling
