= 2008 Tour de l'Aude Cycliste Féminin =

Race details
- Dates: 16–25 May 2008
- Stages: 9 + Prologue
- Distance: 873.9 km (543.0 mi)
- Winning time: 23h 55' 05"

Results
	Winner	Susanne Ljungskog (SWE)	(Menikini–Selle Italia)
	Second	Judith Arndt (GER)	(Team Columbia Women)
	Third	Trixi Worrack (GER)	(Equipe Nürnberger Versicherung)
	Points	Angela Brodtka (GER)	(Team DSB Bank)
	Mountains	Judith Arndt (GER)	(Team High Road Women)
	Young rider	Claudia Häusler (GER)	(Equipe Nürnberger Versicherung)
	Sprints	Monica Holler (GER)	(Bigla Cycling Team)
	Team	Equipe Nürnberger Versicherung	

The 2008 Tour de l'Aude Cycliste Féminin was the 24th edition of the Tour de l'Aude Cycliste Féminin, a women's cycling stage race in France. It was rated by the UCI as a category 2.1 race and was held between 16 and 25 May 2008.

== Stages ==
=== Prologue ===
16 May 2008 – Gruissan to Gruissan, 3.9 km (2.4 mi), Individual time trial

Prologue Result

	Rider	Team	Time
1	Katie Mactier (AUS)	Australia national team	5' 02"
2	Ellen van Dijk (NED)	Netherlands national team	+1"
3	Alison Powers (USA)	United States national team]	+2"

General Classification after the Prologue

	Rider	Team	Time
1	Katie Mactier (AUS)	Australia national team	5' 02"
2	Ellen van Dijk (NED)	Netherlands national team	+1"
3	Alison Powers (USA)	United States national team	+2"

=== Stage 1 ===
17 May 2008 – Rieux Minervois to Rieux Minervois, 107 km (66.5 mi)

Stage 1 result

	Rider	Team	Time
1	Nicole Cooke (GBR)	Great Britain national team	3h 15' 04"
2	Trixi Worrack (GER)	Equipe Nürnberger Versicherung	s.t.
3	Susanne Ljungskog (SWE)	Menikini–Selle Italia	s.t.

General Classification after Stage 1

	Rider	Team	Time
1	Susanne Ljungskog (SWE)	Menikini–Selle Italia	3h 20' 04"
2	Nicole Cooke (GBR)	Great Britain national team	+2"
3	Judith Arndt (GER)	Team Columbia Women	+6"

=== Stage 2 ===
18 May 2008 – Port La Nouvelle to Port La Nouvelle, 27 km (16.8 mi), Team time trial

Stage 2 result

	Team	Riders	Time
1	Netherlands national team	Ellen van Dijk (NED); Loes Gunnewijk (NED); Mirjam Melchers (NED); Regina Bruins (NED)	35' 44"
2	Team Columbia Women	Linda Villumsen (DEN); Ina-Yoko Teutenberg (GER); Alexis Rhodes (AUS); Linda Villumsen (DEN); Judith Arndt (GER); Luise Keller (GER)	+6"
3	Equipe Nürnberger Versicherung	Trixi Worrack (GER); Charlotte Becker (GER); Edits Pucinskaite (LTU); Claudia Häusler (GER)	+8"

General Classification after Stage 2

	Rider	Team	Time
1	Judith Arndt (GER)	Team Columbia Women	3h 56' 00"
2	Trixi Worrack (GER)	Equipe Nürnberger Versicherung	+12"
3	Nicole Cooke (GBR)	Great Britain national team	+40"

=== Stage 3 ===
19 May 2008 – Lezignan Corbières to Lezignan Corbières, 111 km (69.0 mi)

Stage 3 result

	Rider	Team	Time
1	Zulfiya Zabirova (KAZ)	Bigla Cycling Team	2h 52' 54"
2	Angela Brodtka (GER)	Team DSB Bank	+46"
3	Diana Žiliūtė (LTU)	Lithuania national team	+1' 01"

General Classification after Stage 3

	Rider	Team	Time
1	Judith Arndt (GER)	Team Columbia Women	6h 49' 55"
2	Trixi Worrack (GER)	Equipe Nürnberger Versicherung	+12"
3	Nicole Cooke (GBR)	Great Britain national team	+40"

=== Stage 4 ===
20 May 2008 – Osséja to Osséja, 101 km (62.8 mi)

Stage 4 result

	Rider	Team	Time
1	Susanne Ljungskog (SWE)	Menikini–Selle Italia	2h 52' 21"
2	Alison Powers (USA)	United States national team	+2' 53"
3	Emma Johansson (SWE)	AA-Drink Cycling Team	+3' 04"

General Classification after Stage 4

	Rider	Team	Time
1	Susanne Ljungskog (SWE)	Menikini–Selle Italia	9h 42' 53"
2	Judith Arndt (GER)	Team Columbia Women	+3' 39"
3	Trixi Worrack (GER)	Equipe Nürnberger Versicherung	+3' 55"

=== Stage 5 ===
21 May 2008 – Toulouges to Toulouges, 112 km (69.6 mi)

Stage 5 result

	Rider	Team	Time
1	Ina-Yoko Teutenberg (GER)	Team Columbia Women	2h 56' 51"
2	Charlotte Becker (GER)	Equipe Nürnberger Versicherung	+2"
3	Monica Holler (SWE)	Bigla Cycling Team	+4"

General Classification after Stage 5

	Rider	Team	Time
1	Susanne Ljungskog (SWE)	Menikini–Selle Italia	12h 39' 48"
2	Judith Arndt (GER)	Team Columbia Women	+3' 39"
3	Trixi Worrack (GER)	Equipe Nürnberger Versicherung	+3' 55"

=== Stage 6 ===
22 May 2008 – Rennes-les-Bains to Axat, 117 km (72.7 mi)

Stage 6 result

	Rider	Team	Time
1	Vicki Whitelaw (AUS)	Australia national team	3h 10' 16"
2	Sharon Laws (GBR)	Great Britain national team	s.t.
3	Regina Bruins (NED)	Netherlands national team	+6"

General Classification after Stage 6

	Rider	Team	Time
1	Susanne Ljungskog (SWE)	Menikini–Selle Italia	15h 50' 51"
2	Judith Arndt (GER)	Team Columbia Women	+3' 39"
3	Trixi Worrack (GER)	Equipe Nürnberger Versicherung	+3' 55"

=== Stage 7 ===
23 May 2008 – Castelnaudary to Castelnaudary, 108 km (67.1 mi)

Stage 7 result

	Rider	Team	Time
1	Zulfiya Zabirova (KAZ)	Bigla Cycling Team	2h 55' 54"
2	Katharine Carroll (USA)	United States national team	+31"
3	Martine Bras (NED)	Netherlands national team	+31"

General Classification after Stage 7

	Rider	Team	Time
1	Susanne Ljungskog (SWE)	Menikini–Selle Italia	18h 51' 43"
2	Judith Arndt (GER)	Team Columbia Women	+3' 39"
3	Irene van den Broek (NED)	AA-Drink Cycling Team	+3' 49"

=== Stage 8 ===
24 May 2008 – Bram to Bram, 116 km (72.1 mi)

Stage 8 result

	Rider	Team	Time
1	Ina-Yoko Teutenberg (GER)	Bigla Cycling Team	3h 08' 35"
2	Sara Carrigan (AUS)	Lotto–Belisol Ladiesteam	s.t.
3	Angela Brodtka (GER)	Team DSB Bank	s.t.

General Classification after Stage 8

	Rider	Team	Time
1	Susanne Ljungskog (SWE)	Menikini–Selle Italia	22h 00' 16"
2	Judith Arndt (GER)	Team Columbia Women	+3' 38"
3	Irene van den Broek (NED)	AA-Drink Cycling Team	+3' 51"

=== Stage 9 ===
25 May 2008 – Limoux to Limoux, 71 km (44.1 mi)

Stage 9 result

	Rider	Team	Time
1	Judith Arndt (GER)	Team Columbia Women	1h 54' 56"
2	Susanne Ljungskog (SWE)	Menikini–Selle Italia	s.t.
3	Nicole Cooke (GBR)	Great Britain national team	s.t.

General Classification after Stage 9

	Rider	Team	Time
1	Susanne Ljungskog (SWE)	Menikini–Selle Italia	23h 55' 05"
2	Judith Arndt (GER)	Team Columbia Women	+3' 53"
3	Trixi Worrack (GER)	Equipe Nürnberger Versicherung	+4' 02"

== Final classification ==
	Rider	Team	Time
1	Susanne Ljungskog (SWE)	Menikini–Selle Italia	23h 55' 05"
2	Judith Arndt (GER)	Team Columbia Women	+3' 53"
3	Trixi Worrack (GER)	Equipe Nürnberger Versicherung	+4' 02"
4	Nicole Cooke (GBR)	Great Britain national team	+4' 23"
5	Irene van den Broek (NED)	AA-Drink Cycling Team	+4' 57"
6	Sharon Laws (GBR)	Great Britain national team	+5' 11"
7	Claudia Häusler (GER)	Equipe Nürnberger Versicherung	+5' 42"
8	Amber Neben (USA)	United States national team	+6' 07"
9	Linda Villumsen (DEN)	Team Columbia Women	+7' 06"
10	Regina Bruins (NED)	Netherlands national team	+7' 15"

== See also ==
- 2008 in women's road cycling
