= 2008 Giro della Toscana Int. Femminile – Memorial Michela Fanini =

Race details
- Dates: 16–21 September 2008
- Stages: 7 (counted 2 half stages as 2 stages)
- Distance: 582.2 km (361.8 mi)
- Winning time: 14h 47' 33"

Results
	Winner	Judith Arndt (GER)	(Team Columbia Women)
	Second	Trixi Worrack (GER)	(Equipe Nürnberger Versicherung)
	Third	Marianne Vos (NED)	(Team DSB Bank)

The 2008 Giro della Toscana Int. Femminile – Memorial Michela Fanini was the 15th edition of the Giro della Toscana Int. Femminile – Memorial Michela Fanini, a women's cycling stage race in Italy. It was rated by the UCI as a category 2.1 race and was held between 16 and 21 September 2008.

== Stages ==
=== Stage 1 ===
12 September 2008 – Viareggio to Viareggio, 5.5 km (3.4 mi), Team time trial

Stage 1 Result

	Team	Riders	Time
1	Team Columbia Women	Linda Villumsen (DEN); Ina-Yoko Teutenberg (GER); Chantal Beltman (NED); Anke Wichmann (GER); Judith Arndt (GER); Emilia Fahlin (SWE); Luise Keller (GER)	6' 32.88"
2	Netherlands national team	Ellen van Dijk (NED); Iris Slappendel (NED); Kirsten Wild (NED); Regina Bruins (NED); Irene van den Broek (NED); Loes Gunnewijk (NED)	+3.40"
3	Equipe Nürnberger Versicherung	Trixi Worrack (GER); Charlotte Becker (GER); Modosta Vzesniauskaite (LTU); Edits Pucinskaite (LTU); Eva Lutz (GER); Suzanne de Goede (NED); Claudia Häusler (GER)	+7.95"

General Classification after Stage 1

	Rider	Team	Time
1	Linda Villumsen (DEN)	Team Columbia Women	6' 33"
2	Ina-Yoko Teutenberg (GER)	Team Columbia Women	+0"
3	Chantal Beltman (NED)	Team Columbia Women	+0"

=== Stage 2a ===
17 September 2008 – Porcari to Montecarlo, 57.2 km (35.5 mi)

Stage 2a Result

	Rider	Team	Time
1	Marianne Vos (NED)	Team DSB Bank	1h 25' 01"
2	Noemi Cantele (ITA)	Bigla Cycling Team	s.t.
3	Judith Arndt (GER)	Team Columbia Women	s.t.

General Classification after Stage 2a

	Rider	Team	Time
1	Judith Arndt (GER)	Team Columbia Women	1h 31' 31"
2	Chantal Beltman (NED)	Team Columbia Women	+4"
3	Linda Villumsen (ITA)	Team Columbia Women	+4"

=== Stage 2b ===
17 September 2008 – Pontedera to Altopascio, 74.4 km (46.2 mi)

Stage 2b Result

	Rider	Team	Time
1	Ina-Yoko Teutenberg (GER)	Team Columbia Women	1h 51' 08"
2	Angela Brodtka (GER)	Team DSB Bank	+12"
3	Monia Baccaille (ITA)	Fenixs	+12"

General Classification after Stage 2b

	Rider	Team	Time
1	Judith Arndt (GER)	Team Columbia Women	3h 22' 52"
2	Emilia Fahlin (SWE)	Team Columbia Women	+3"
3	Chantal Beltman (NED)	Team Columbia Women	+4"

=== Stage 3 ===
18 September 2008 – Lari to Volterra, 122.1 km (75.9 mi)

Stage 3 Result

	Rider	Team	Time
1	Mara Abbott (USA)	Team Columbia Women	3h 23' 15"
2	Tatiana Antoshina (RUS)	Fenixs	+3"
3	Judith Arndt (GER)	Team Columbia Women	+3"

General Classification after Stage 3

	Rider	Team	Time
1	Judith Arndt (GER)	Team Columbia Women	6h 46' 06"
2	Nicole Brändli (SUI)	Bigla Cycling Team	+27"
3	Edits Pucinskaite (LTU)	Equipe Nürnberger Versicherung	+27"

=== Stage 4 ===
19 September 2008 – Campi Bisenzio to Campi Bisenzio, 115.2 km (71.6 mi)

Stage 4 Result

	Rider	Team	Time
1	Ina-Yoko Teutenberg (GER)	Team Columbia Women	3h 36' 13"
2	Marianne Vos (NED)	Team DSB Bank	s.t.
3	Kirsten Wild (NED)	Netherlands national team	s.t.

General Classification after Stage 4

	Rider	Team	Time
1	Judith Arndt (GER)	Team Columbia Women	9h 22' 19"
2	Marianne Vos (NED)	Team DSB Bank	+23"
3	Edits Pucinskaite (LTU)	Equipe Nürnberger Versicherung	+27"

=== Stage 5 ===
20 September 2008 – Segromigno in Piano to Capannori, 100.9 km (62.7 mi)

Stage 5 Result

	Rider	Team	Time
1	Judith Arndt (GER)	Team Columbia Women	2h 39' 30"
2	Trixi Worrack (GER)	Equipe Nürnberger Versicherung	s.t.
3	Tatlana Guderzo (ITA)	Gauss RDZ Ormu	+2"

General Classification after Stage 5

	Rider	Team	Time
1	Judith Arndt (GER)	Team Columbia Women	12h 01' 39"
2	Trixi Worrack (GER)	Equipe Nürnberger Versicherung	+42"
3	Marianne Vos (NED)	Team DSB Bank	+1' 03"

=== Stage 6 ===
21 September 2008 – Quarrata to Florence, 106.9 km (66.4 mi)

Stage 6 Result

	Rider	Team	Time
1	Monica Holler (SWE)	Bigla Cycling Team	2h 44' 39"
2	Elke Gebhardt (GER)	Germany national team	s.t.
3	Brooke Miller (USA)	United States national team	s.t.

General Classification after Stage 6

	Rider	Team	Time
1	Judith Arndt (GER)	Team Columbia Women	14h 47' 33"
2	Trixi Worrack (GER)	Equipe Nürnberger Versicherung	+42"
3	Marianne Vos (NED)	Team DSB Bank	+1' 03"

== Final classification ==
	Rider	Team	Time
1	Judith Arndt (GER)	Team Columbia Women	14h 47' 33"
2	Trixi Worrack (GER)	Equipe Nürnberger Versicherung	+42"
3	Marianne Vos (NED)	Team DSB Bank	+1' 03"
4	Tatlana Guderzo (ITA)	Gauss RDZ Ormu	+1' 11"
5	Edits Pucinskaite (LTU)	Equipe Nürnberger Versicherung	+1' 40"
6	Grote Treier (EST)	Gauss RDZ Ormu	+1' 59"
7	Mara Abbott (USA)	Team Columbia Women	+2' 00"
8	Nicole Brändli (SUI)	Bigla Cycling Team	+2' 15"
9	Monia Baccaille (ITA)	Fenixs	+2' 23"
10	Alexandra Wrubleski (CAN)	Canada national team	+2' 35"

== See also ==
- 2008 in women's road cycling
