= 2008 Holland Ladies Tour =

Race details
- Dates: September 2 – September 7
- Stages: 6
- Distance: 566.6 km (352.1 mi)
- Winning time: 14h 22' 12"

Results
Jersey awarded to the overall winner	Winner	Charlotte Becker (GER)	(Nürnberger Versicherung)
	Second	Ina-Yoko Teutenberg (GER)	(Team Columbia)
	Third	Irene van den Broek (NED)	(AA-Drink Cycling Team)
Jersey awarded to the points classification winner	Points	Ina-Yoko Teutenberg (GER)	(Team Columbia)
Jersey awarded to the mountains classification winner	Mountains	Angela Hennig (GER)	(Team DSB Bank)
Jersey awarded to the youth classification winner	Youth	Marianne Vos (NED)	(Team DSB Bank)
Jersey awarded to the sprints classification winner	Sprints	Charlotte Becker (GER)	(Nürnberger Versicherung)
	Team	Equipe Nürnberger Versicherung	

The 11th edition of the annual Holland Ladies Tour was held from September 2 to September 7, 2008. The women's stage race with an UCI rating of 2.2 started in Hellendoorn, and ended in Berg en Terblijt.

== Stages ==
=== 2008-09-03: Hellendoorn — Hellendoorn (109.5 km) ===
Place	Stage 1		General Classification	
Place	Name	Time	Name	Time
1.	Ina-Yoko Teutenberg (GER)	02:38.48	Ina-Yoko Teutenberg (GER)	02:38.38
2.	Kirsten Wild (NED)	—	Kirsten Wild (NED)	+0.04
3.	Marianne Vos (NED)	—	Loes Markerink (NED)	—

=== 2008-09-03: Hellendoorn — Hellendoorn (20.5 km) ===
Place	Stage 2 (Individual Time Trial)		General Classification	
Place	Name	Time	Name	Time
1.	Trixi Worrack (GER)	00:27.47	Kirsten Wild (GER)	03:06.32
2.	Mirjam Melchers (NED)	+0.01	Trixi Worrack (GER)	+0.03
3.	Judith Arndt (GER)	+0.01	Ina-Yoko Teutenberg (GER)	+0.03

=== 2008-09-04: Leek — Roden (113.2 km) ===
Place	Stage 3		General Classification	
Place	Name	Time	Name	Time
1.	Anke Wichmann (GER)	02:57.27	Charlotte Becker (GER)	06:04.10
2.	Sarah Düster (GER)	—	Irene van den Broek (NED)	+0.52
3.	Angela Hennig (GER)	+0.05	Iris Slappendel (NED)	+1.04

=== 2008-09-05: Dedemsvaart — Hardenberg (85.2 km) ===
Place	Stage 4		General Classification	
Place	Name	Time	Name	Time
1.	Ina-Yoko Teutenberg (GER)	02:00.21	Charlotte Becker (GER)	08:04.39
2.	Kirsten Wild (NED)	—	Irene van den Broek (NED)	+0.44
3.	Suzanne de Goede (NED)	—	Iris Slappendel (NED)	+0.56

=== 2008-09-06: Boxtel — Boxtel (121.5 km) ===
Place	Stage 5		General Classification	
Place	Name	Time	Name	Time
1.	Loes Markerink (NED)	03:10.56	Charlotte Becker (GER)	11:15.56
2.	Marit Huisman (NED)	—	Irene van den Broek (NED)	+0.44
3.	Petra Dijkman (NED)	—	Iris Slappendel (NED)	+0.56

=== 2008-09-07: Valkenburg — Berg en Terblijt (116.7 km) ===
Place	Stage 6		General Classification	
Place	Name	Time	Name	Time
1.	Ina-Yoko Teutenberg (GER)	03:05.44	Charlotte Becker (GER)	14:22.12
2.	Marianne Vos (NED)	+0.12	Ina-Yoko Teutenberg (GER)	+0.38
3.	Judith Arndt (GER)	+0.22	Irene van den Broek (NED)	+0.50

== Final standings ==
=== General Classification ===
RANK	NAME	TEAM	TIME
1.	Charlotte Becker (GER)	Equipe Nürnberger Versicherung	14:22.12
2.	Ina-Yoko Teutenberg (GER)	Team Columbia Women	+ 0.38
3.	Irene van den Broek (NED)	AA-Drink Cycling Team	+ 0.50
4.	Marianne Vos (NED)	Team DSB Bank	+ 1.03
5.	Judith Arndt (GER)	Team Columbia Women	+ 1.15
6.	Trixi Worrack (GER)	Equipe Nürnberger Versicherung	+ 1.43
7.	Loes Gunnewijk (NED)	Team Flexpoint	+ 1.59
8.	Sarah Düster (GER)	Cervelo Lifeforce Pro Cycling Team	+ 2.29
9.	Regina Bruins (NED)	Ton van Bemmelen Sports/Odysis	+ 2.37
10.	An van Rie (BEL)	Vrienden Van Het Platteland	+ 4.55

=== Points Classification ===
RANK	NAME	TEAM	POINTS
1.	Ina-Yoko Teutenberg (GER)	Team Columbia Women	99
2.	Kirsten Wild (NED)	AA-Drink Cycling Team	52
3.	Judith Arndt (GER)	Team Columbia Women	42

=== Mountains Classification ===
RANK	NAME	TEAM	POINTS
1.	Angela Hennig (GER)	Team DSB Bank	56
2.	Ina-Yoko Teutenberg (GER)	Team Columbia Women	26
3.	Loes Gunnewijk (NED)	Team Flexpoint	21

=== Best Young Rider Classification ===
RANK	NAME	TEAM	TIME
1.	Marianne Vos (NED)	Team DSB Bank	14:23.15
2.	Marie Lindberg (SWE)	Equipe Nürnberger Versicherung	+ 10.16
3.	Lucinda Brand (NED)	Dura Vermeer / Specialized Mix	+ 10.54

=== Sprint Classification ===
RANK	NAME	TEAM	POINTS
1.	Charlotte Becker (GER)	Equipe Nürnberger Versicherung	4
2.	Marianne Vos (NED)	Team DSB Bank	4
3.	Trixi Worrack (GER)	Equipe Nürnberger Versicherung	3

=== Most Aggressive Rider Classification ===
RANK	NAME	TEAM	POINTS
1.	Elisabeth Braam (NED)	Team Flexpoint	8
2.	Loes Gunnewijk (NED)	Team Flexpoint	6
3.	Marianne Vos (NED)	Team DSB Bank	5
