= 2008 Ster Zeeuwsche Eilanden =

2008 Rabo Ster Zeeuwsche Eilanden
Race details
- Dates: 19–21 June 2008
- Stages: 3
- Distance: 228.2 km (141.8 mi)
- Winning time: 5h 27' 07"

Results
Jersey awarded to the overall winner	Winner	Ina-Yoko Teutenberg (GER)	(Team Columbia Women)
	Second	Kirsten Wild (NED)	(AA-Drink Cycling Team)
	Third	Ellen van Dijk (NED)	(Vrienden van het Platteland)
Jersey awarded to the points classification winner	Points	Ina-Yoko Teutenberg (GER)	(Team Columbia Women)
Jersey awarded to the young rider classification winner	Young rider	Ellen van Dijk (NED)	(Vrienden van het Platteland)
Jersey awarded to the sprints classification winner	Sprints	Ina-Yoko Teutenberg (GER)	(Team Columbia Women)
	Team	Vrienden van het Platteland	

The 2008 Rabo Ster Zeeuwsche Eilanden was the 11th edition of the Ster Zeeuwsche Eilanden, a women's cycling stage race in the Netherlands. It was rated by the UCI as a category 2.2 race and was held between 19 and 21 June 2008.

== Stages ==
=== Stage 1 ===
19 June 2008 – Vlissingen to Vlissingen, 7.1 km (4.4 mi) (Individual time trial)

Stage 1 result

	Rider	Team	Time
1	Kirsten Wild (NED)	AA-Drink Cycling Team	9' 07"
2	Ellen van Dijk (NED)	Vrienden van het Platteland	+2"
3	Regina Bruins (NED)	RT Ton v Bemmelen/Odysis	+4"
4	Ina-Yoko Teutenberg (GER)	Team Columbia Women	+11"
5	Annemiek van Vleuten (NED)	Vrienden van het Platteland	+23"

General Classification after Stage 1

	Rider	Team	Time
1	Kirsten Wild (NED)	AA-Drink Cycling Team	9' 07"
2	Ellen van Dijk (NED)	Vrienden van het Platteland	+2"
3	Regina Bruins (NED)	RT Ton v Bemmelen/Odysis	+4"
4	Ina-Yoko Teutenberg (GER)	Team Columbia Women	+11"
5	Annemiek van Vleuten (NED)	Vrienden van het Platteland	+23"

=== Stage 2 ===
20 June 2008 – Middelburg to Vlissingen, 109.7 km (68.2 mi)

Stage 2 result

	Rider	Team	Time
1	Ina-Yoko Teutenberg (GER)	Team Columbia Women	2h 40' 25"
2	Kirsten Wild (NED)	AA-Drink Cycling Team	s.t.
3	Angela Brodtka (GER)	Team DSB Bank	s.t.
4	Monique van de Ree (NED)	RSC De Zuidwesthoek	s.t.
5	Martine Bras (NED)	Vrienden van het Platteland	s.t.

General Classification after Stage 2

	Rider	Team	Time
1	Kirsten Wild (NED)	AA-Drink Cycling Team	2h 49' 22"
2	Ina-Yoko Teutenberg (GER)	Team Columbia Women	+5"
3	Ellen van Dijk (NED)	Vrienden van het Platteland	+10"
4	Regina Bruins (NED)	RT Ton v Bemmelen/Odysis	+14"
5	Annemiek van Vleuten (NED)	Vrienden van het Platteland	+33"

=== Stage 3 ===
21 June 2008 – Kamperland to Renesse, 111.4 km (69.2 mi)

Stage 3 result

	Rider	Team	Time
1	Ina-Yoko Teutenberg (GER)	Team Columbia Women	2h 37' 53"
2	Kirsten Wild (NED)	AA-Drink Cycling Team	s.t.
3	Angela Brodtka (GER)	Team DSB Bank	s.t.
4	Ellen van Dijk (NED)	Vrienden van het Platteland	s.t.
5	Martine Bras (NED)	Vrienden van het Platteland	s.t.

General Classification after Stage 3

	Rider	Team	Time
1	Ina-Yoko Teutenberg (GER)	Team Columbia Women	5h 27' 07"
2	Kirsten Wild (NED)	AA-Drink Cycling Team	+2"
3	Ellen van Dijk (NED)	Vrienden van het Platteland	+18"
4	Regina Bruins (NED)	RT Ton v Bemmelen/Odysis	+26"
5	Annemiek van Vleuten (NED)	Vrienden van het Platteland	+41"

== Final classifications ==
=== General classification ===
	Rider	Team	Time
1	Ina-Yoko Teutenberg (GER)	Team Columbia Women	5h 27' 07"
2	Kirsten Wild (NED)	AA-Drink Cycling Team	+2"
3	Ellen van Dijk (NED)	Vrienden van het Platteland	+18"
4	Regina Bruins (NED)	RT Ton v Bemmelen/Odysis	+26"
5	Annemiek van Vleuten (NED)	Vrienden van het Platteland	+41"
6	Katherine Bates (AUS)	Team Columbia Women	+43"
7	Vera Koedooder (NED)	Lotto–Belisol Ladiesteam	+44"
8	Alexis Rhodes (AUS)	Team Columbia Women	+46"
9	Iris Slappendel (NED)	Team Flexpoint	+46"
10	Angela Brodtka (GER)	Team DSB Bank	+46"

=== Points classification ===
	Rider	Team	Points
1	Ina-Yoko Teutenberg (GER)	Team Columbia Women	57
2	Kirsten Wild (NED)	AA-Drink Cycling Team	56
3	Angela Brodtka (GER)	Team DSB Bank	42
4	Martine Bras (NED)	Vrienden van het Platteland	34
5	Elise van Hage (NED)	Team Flexpoint	29
6	Monique van de Ree (NED)	RSC De Zuidwesthoek	29
7	Ellen van Dijk (NED)	Vrienden van het Platteland	28
8	Annemiek van Vleuten (NED)	Vrienden van het Platteland	26
9	Andrea Bosman (NED)	Team DSB Bank	26
10	Regina Bruins (NED)	RT Ton v Bemmelen/Odysis	24

=== Youth classification ===
	Rider	Team	Points
1	Ellen van Dijk (NED)	Vrienden van het Platteland	5h 27' 25"
2	Regina Bruins (NED)	RT Ton v Bemmelen/Odysis	+8"
3	Elise van Hage (NED)	Team Flexpoint	+35"
4	Marit Huisman (NED)	Vrienden van het Platteland	+39"
5	Chantal Beltman (NED)	Team Columbia Women	+40"
6	Nikki Harris (GBR)	De Sprinters Malderen	+45"
7	Mariëlle Kerste (NED)	Merida Ladies Cycling Team	+48"
8	Linda Van Rijen (NED)	Team DSB Bank	+51"
9	Anne de Wildt (NED)	Weijers-Hako Barrhopoort	+54"
10	Anne Eversdijk (NED)	RT Ton v Bemmelen/Odysis	+56"

=== Sprints classification ===
	Rider	Team	Points
1	Ina-Yoko Teutenberg (GER)	Team Columbia Women	15
2	Kirsten Wild (NED)	AA-Drink Cycling Team	6
3	Katherine Bates (AUS)	Team Columbia Women	5
4	Esther Kortekaas (NED)	Restore Cycling Team	5
5	Vera Koedooder (NED)	Lotto–Belisol Ladiesteam	4
6	Louise Moriarty (IRL)	Swift Racing	3
7	Chantal Beltman (NED)	Team Columbia Women	3
8	Ellen van Dijk (NED)	Vrienden van het Platteland	3
9	Iris Slappendel (NED)	Team Flexpoint	1
10	Emilia Fahlin (SWE)	Team Columbia Women	1

== Classification leadership ==
Stage	Winner	General classification	Youth classification	Points classification	Sprints classification	Team classification
1	Kirsten Wild	Kirsten Wild	Ellen van Dijk	Kirsten Wild	-	Vrienden van het Platteland
2	Ina-Yoko Teutenberg	Kirsten Wild	Ellen van Dijk	Kirsten Wild	Ina-Yoko Teutenberg	Vrienden van het Platteland
3	Ina-Yoko Teutenberg	Ina-Yoko Teutenberg	Ellen van Dijk	Ina-Yoko Teutenberg	Ina-Yoko Teutenberg	Vrienden van het Platteland
Final Classification		Ina-Yoko Teutenberg	Ellen van Dijk	Ina-Yoko Teutenberg	Ina-Yoko Teutenberg	Vrienden van het Platteland

== See also ==
- 2008 in women's road cycling
