= 2008 AA-Drink Cycling Team season =

Women road cycling season

2008 AA-Drink Cycling Team
- UCI Team ranking: 5th

Season victories
- One-day races
- Stage race overall
- Best ranked rider: Emma Johansson (6th)

The 2008 women's road cycling season was the fourth season for the 2008 UCI Women's Cycling Team: AA-Drink Cycling Team (UCI code: AAD), which began as Van Bemmelen–AA Drink in 2005.

== Roster ==
- Marlijn Binnendijk (The Netherlands) 12-05-1986
- Chantal Blaak (The Netherlands) 22-10-1989
- Latoya Brulee (Belgium) 09-12-1988
- Paulina Brzeźna-Bentkowska (Poland) 10-09-1981
- Maxime Groenewegen (The Netherlands) 14-07-1988
- Ludivine Henrion (Belgium) 23-01-1984
- Emma Johansson (Sweden) 23-09-1983
- Gabrielle Rovers (The Netherlands) 21-11-1976
- Theresa Senff (Germany) 02-02-1982
- Inge van den Broeck (Belgium) 21-03-1978
- Irene van den Broek (The Netherlands) 26-08-1980
- Laure Werner (Belgium) 22-02-1981
- Kirsten Wild (The Netherlands) 15-10-1982

== Results ==
=== Season victories ===
Single day and stage races 2008
Date	Nation	Race	Cat.	Winner
	Belgium	Omloop Het Nieuwsblad		(Netherlands) Kirsten Wild
	Netherlands	Omloop van Borsele		(Netherlands) Kirsten Wild
	Netherlands	Therme kasseienomloop		(Netherlands) Kirsten Wild
	Netherlands	Stage 1 Rabobank Ster Zeeuwsche Eilanden		(Netherlands) Kirsten Wild
	France	Stage 2 Tour Féminin en Limousin		(Poland) Paulina Brzeźna
	France	Overall Trophée d'Or Féminin		(Sweden) Emma Johansson
	France	Stage 5 Trophée d'Or Féminin		(Sweden) Emma Johansson
	France	Grand Prix de France		(Belgium) Ludivine Henrion

National, Continental and World champions 2008
Date	Discipline	Jersey	Winner
	Swedish National Time Trial Championships		Emma Johansson
	Polish National Time Trial Championships		Paulina Brzeźna
	2008 Dutch National Track Championships – Scratch		Kirsten Wild

== Results in major races ==
=== Women's World Cup 2008 ===
Results at the 2008 UCI Women's Road World Cup races
#	Date	Race	Country	Best rider	Place
#1	24 February	Geelong World Cup	Australia		
#2	24 March	Trofeo Alfredo Binda-Comune di Cittiglio	Italy		
#3	6 April	Tour of Flanders for Women	Belgium		
#4	12 April	Ronde van Drenthe	Netherlands		
#5	23 April	La Flèche Wallonne Féminine	Belgium	(Sweden) Emma Johansson	12th
#6	4 May	Tour de Berne	Switzerland		
#7	31 May	Coupe du Monde Cycliste Féminine de Montréal	Canada		
#8	30 July	Open de Suède Vårgårda	Sweden	(Netherlands) Kirsten Wild	10th
#9	1 August	Open de Suède Vårgårda TTT	Sweden	AA-Drink Cycling Team	6th
#10	24 August	GP de Plouay – Bretagne	France	(Sweden) Emma Johansson	10th
#11	16 September	Rund um die Nürnberger Altstadt	Germany		

Results in other major single day races
Date	Race (Note: Riders are in these championships part of the national team)	Rider	Place
28 March	Track Cycling World Championships – Women's team pursuit	(Netherlands) Marlijn Binnendijk (with Ellen van Dijk and Elise van Hage)	6th
23 September	Road World Championships – Women's time trial	(Sweden) Emma Johansson	14th
24 September	Road World Championships – Women's road race	(Sweden) Emma Johansson	4th

== Other achievements ==
=== Dutch national records, team pursuit ===
The women's 3000 m team pursuit track cycling discipline was introduced at the 2007–08 track cycling season. The Dutch team including Ellen van Dijk and Yvonne Hijgenaar rode the team pursuit for the first time at Round 4 at the 2007–08 UCI Track Cycling World Cup in Copenhagen in a time of 3:36.901 (49.792 km/h). They broke the record later that day. At the 2008 UCI Track Cycling World Championships the Dutch team including Van Dijk broke the record again in the qualifying round. This is not the current record anymore.

Time	Speed (km/h)	Cyclists	Event	Location of race	Date	Ref
3:36.901	49.792	Marlijn Binnendijk (with Ellen van Dijk and Yvonne Hijgenaar)	2007–08 UCI Track Cycling World Cup Classics – Round 4 (qualification)	(Denmark) Copenhagen	17 February 2008	
3:32.666	50.783	Marlijn Binnendijk (with Ellen van Dijk and Yvonne Hijgenaar)	2007–08 UCI Track Cycling World Cup Classics – Round 4 (gold-medal race)	(Denmark) Copenhagen	17 February 2008	
3:31.596	51.040	Marlijn Binnendijk (with Ellen van Dijk and Elise van Hage)	2008 UCI Track Cycling World Championships (qualifying)	(United Kingdom) Manchester	28 March 2008	
