= 2009 Tour du Grand Montréal =

Race details
- Dates: 1–4 June 2009
- Stages: 5
- Distance: 358 km (222.5 mi)
- Winning time: 8h 40' 03"

Results
| | Winner | Kirsten Wild (NED) | (Cervélo Test Team) |
| | Second | Trixi Worrack (GER) | (Equipe Nürnberger Versicherung) |
| | Third | Lauren Tamayo (USA) | (Team TIBCO) |
| | Points | Kirsten Wild (NED) | (Cervélo Test Team) |
| | Mountains | Carla Swart (RSA) | (Equipe Mixte 2 MTN Energade-Lig) |
| | Youth | Regina Bruins (NED) | (Cervélo Test Team) |

The 2009 Tour du Grand Montréal was the 8th and last edition of the Tour du Grand Montréal, a women's cycling stage race in Canada. It was rated by the UCI as a category 2.1 race and was held between 1 and 4 June 2009.

== Stages ==
=== Stage 1 ===
1 June 2009 – Châteauguay to Châteauguay, 85.5 km (53.1 mi)

Stage 1 result

| | Rider | Team | Time |
|---|---|---|---|
| 1 | Kirsten Wild (NED) | Cervélo Test Team | 1h 58' 43" |
| 2 | Lauren Tamayo (USA) | Team TIBCO | s.t. |
| 3 | Martine Bras (NED) | Selle Italia–Ghezzi | s.t. |

General Classification after Stage 1

| | Rider | Team | Time |
|---|---|---|---|
| 1 | Kirsten Wild (NED) | Cervélo Test Team | 1h 58' 25" |
| 2 | Lauren Tamayo (USA) | Team TIBCO | +11" |
| 3 | Martine Bras (NED) | Selle Italia–Ghezzi | +12" |

=== Stage 2 ===
2 June 2009 – Granby to Granby, 104.0 km (64.6 mi)

Stage 2 result

| | Rider | Team | Time |
|---|---|---|---|
| 1 | Kirsten Wild (NED) | Cervélo Test Team | 2h 35' 43" |
| 2 | Rochelle Gilmore (AUS) | Lotto–Belisol Ladiesteam | s.t. |
| 3 | Regina Schleicher (GER) | Equipe Nürnberger Versicherung | s.t. |

General Classification after Stage 2

| | Rider | Team | Time |
|---|---|---|---|
| 1 | Kirsten Wild (NED) | Cervélo Test Team | 4h 33' 49" |
| 2 | Lauren Tamayo (USA) | Team TIBCO | +28" |
| 3 | Martine Bras (NED) | Selle Italia–Ghezzi | +30" |

=== Stage 3 ===
3 June 2009 – Lachine to Lachine (individual time trial), 3.5 km (2.2 mi)

Stage 3 result

| | Rider | Team | Time |
|---|---|---|---|
| 1 | Regina Bruins (NED) | Cervélo Test Team | 3' 57" |
| 2 | Kirsten Wild (NED) | Cervélo Test Team | +1" |
| 3 | Ellen van Dijk (NED) | Team Columbia–High Road Women | +8" |

General Classification after Stage 3

| | Rider | Team | Time |
|---|---|---|---|
| 1 | Kirsten Wild (NED) | Cervélo Test Team | 4h 37' 47" |
| 2 | Regina Bruins (NED) | Cervélo Test Team | +36" |
| 3 | Lauren Tamayo (USA) | Team TIBCO | +38" |

=== Stage 4 ===
3 June 2009 – Montreal (criterium), 50.0 km (31.1 mi)

Stage 4 result

| | Rider | Team | Time |
|---|---|---|---|
| 1 | Kirsten Wild (NED) | Cervélo Test Team | 1h 10' 23" |
| 2 | Trixi Worrack (GER) | Equipe Nürnberger Versicherung | s.t. |
| 3 | Brooke Miller (USA) | Team TIBCO | s.t. |

General Classification after Stage 4

| | Rider | Team | Time |
|---|---|---|---|
| 1 | Kirsten Wild (NED) | Cervélo Test Team | 5h 47' 59" |
| 2 | Trixi Worrack (GER) | Equipe Nürnberger Versicherung | +42" |
| 3 | Regina Bruins (NED) | Cervélo Test Team | +47" |

=== Stage 5 ===
4 June 2009 – Mont-Saint-Hilaire to Mont-Saint-Hilaire, 115.0 km (71.5 mi)

Stage 5 result

| | Rider | Team | Time |
|---|---|---|---|
| 1 | Hanka Kupfernagel (GER) | Germany national team | 2h 52' 13" |
| 2 | Martine Bras (NED) | Selle Italia–Ghezzi | s.t. |
| 3 | Denise Zuckermandel (GER) | Germany national team | s.t. |

General Classification after Stage 5

| | Rider | Team | Time |
|---|---|---|---|
| 1 | Kirsten Wild (NED) | Cervélo Test Team | 8h 40' 03" |
| 2 | Trixi Worrack (GER) | Equipe Nürnberger Versicherung | +46" |
| 3 | Lauren Tamayo (USA) | Team TIBCO | +55" |

== Final classification ==
| | Rider | Team | Time |
|---|---|---|---|
| 1 | Kirsten Wild (NED) | Cervélo Test Team | 8h 40' 03" |
| 2 | Trixi Worrack (GER) | Equipe Nürnberger Versicherung | 8h 40' 49" |
| 3 | Lauren Tamayo (USA) | Team TIBCO | 8h 40' 58" |
| 4 | Regina Bruins (NED) | Cervélo Test Team | 8h 40' 59" |
| 5 | Hanka Kupfernagel (GER) | Germany national team | 8h 41' 00" |
| 6 | Suzanne de Goede (NED) | Equipe Nürnberger Versicherung | 8h 41' 07" |
| 7 | Alexis Rhodes (DEN) | Webcor Builders | 8h 41' 10" |
| 8 | Charlotte Becker (GER) | Equipe Nürnberger Versicherung | 8h 41' 11" |
| 9 | Judith Arndt (GER) | Team Columbia–High Road Women | 8h 41' 11" |
| 10 | Denise Zuckermandel (GER) | Germany national team | 8h 41' 12" |

== See also ==
- 2009 in women's road cycling
