= Jochen Dornbusch =

German cycling coach

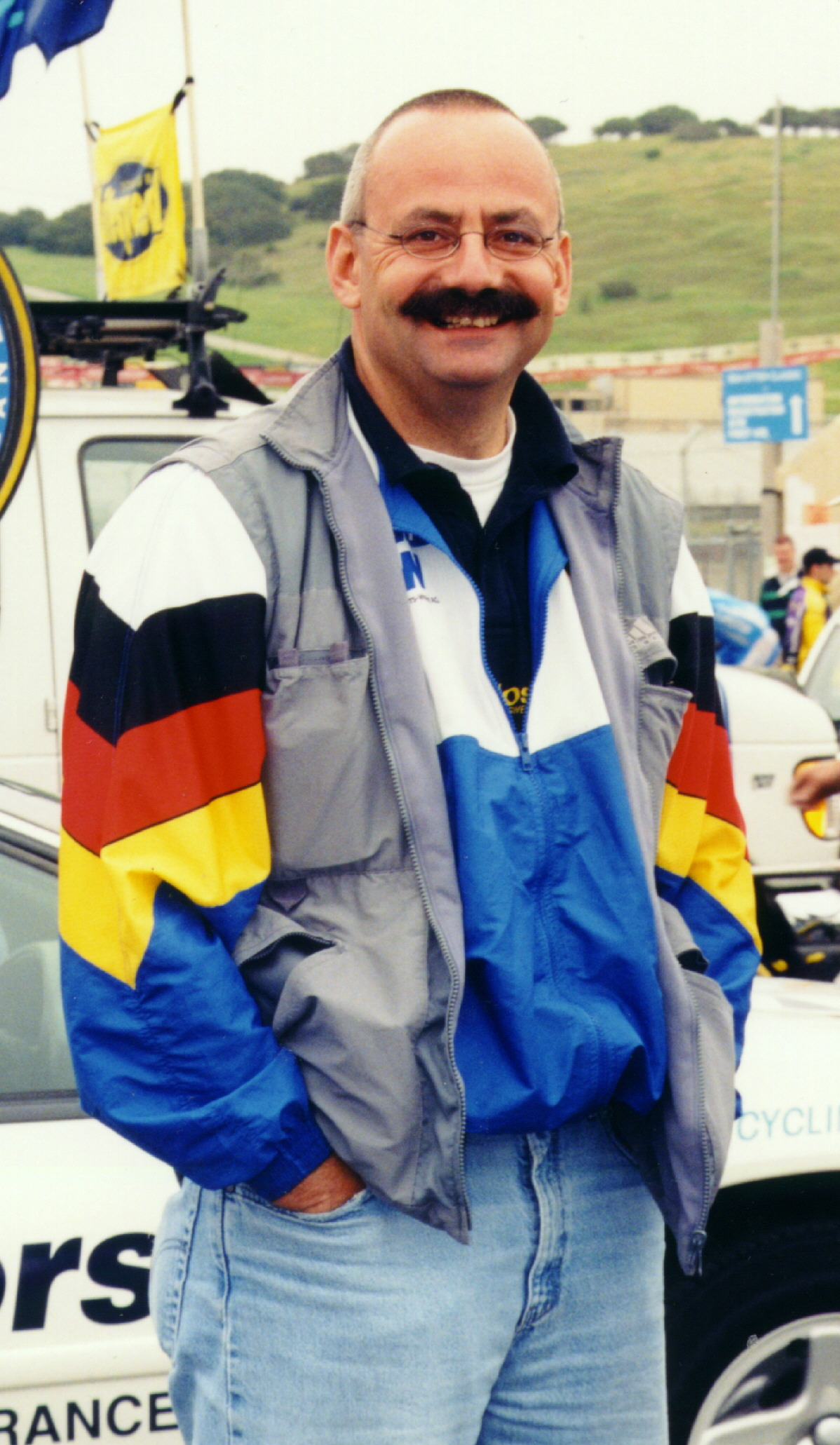
- Jochen Dornbusch at the 2001 Sea Otter Classic stage race
- Born: February 1, 1957 (age 68); Duisburg, Germany
- Occupation: Cycling coach
- Known for: Former coach of German Women’s National Cycling Team; coach of Hong Kong national men’s team

Jochen Dornbusch is the coach for the men's Hong Kong national team. He is the former coach of Germany's National Women's Cycling Team. Under Dornbusch's tutelage, German cycle racers have developed and advanced to the world's top rank of women's cycle racing, including Ina Teutenberg, Jacqueline Brabenetz, Angela Brodtka, Judith Arndt, and former World Junior Champion Tina Liebig.
