= Trixi Worrack =

German road racing cyclist

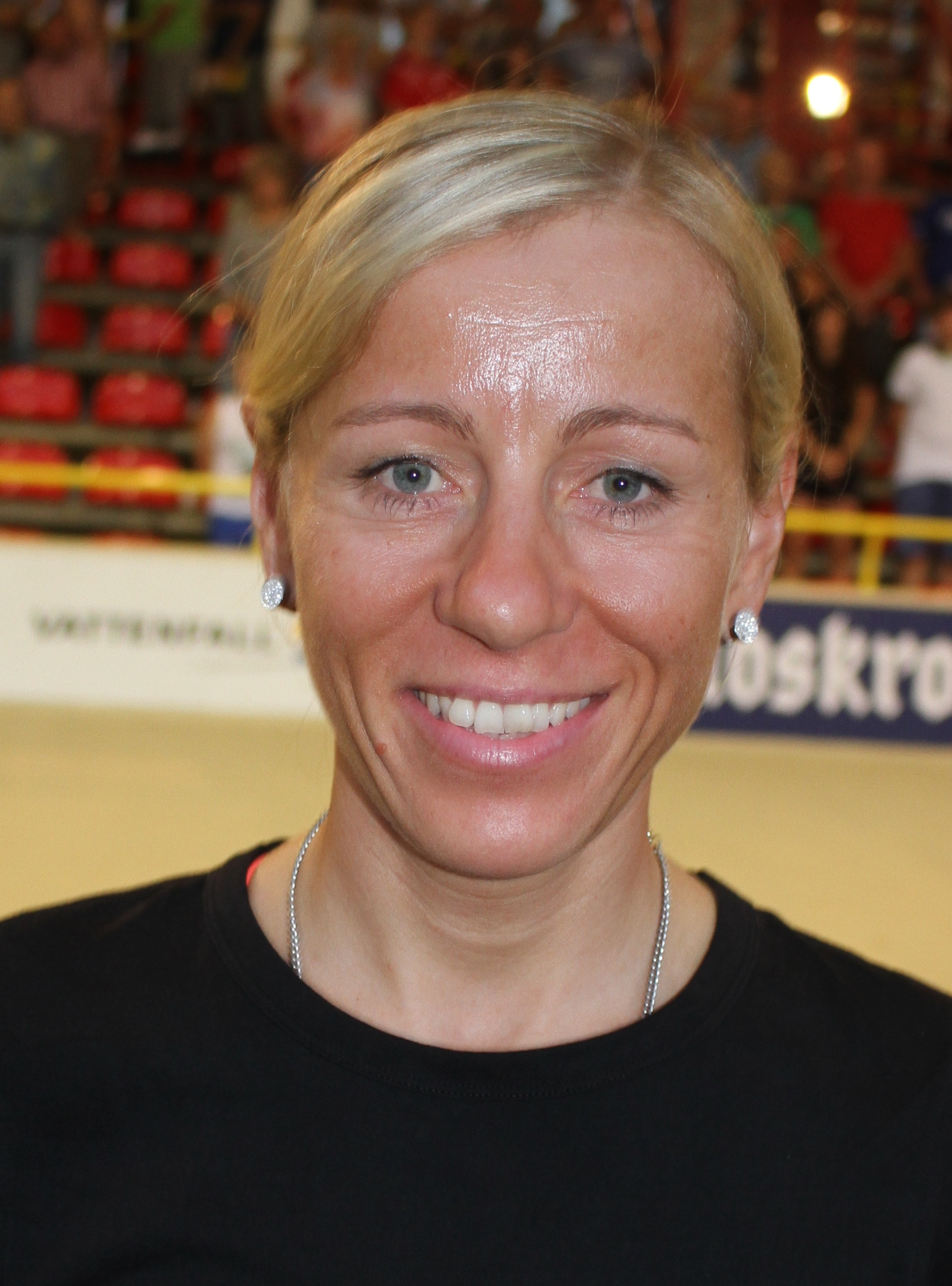
- Worrack in 2016

Personal information
- Full name: Beatrix Worrack
- Nickname: Trixi
- Born: 28 September 1981 (age 45): Cottbus, East Germany; (now Germany)
- Height: 159 cm (5 ft 3 in)
- Weight: 50 kg (110 lb)

Cycling career
- Sport: Cycling
- Disciplines: Road; Track; Cyclo-cross
- Role: Rider

Professional teams
- 2000–2001: Red Bull and German National Team
- 2003–2009: Equipe Nürnberger Versicherung
- 2010: Team Cycling Noris
- 2011: AA Drink–leontien.nl
- 2012–2015: Team Specialized–lululemon
- 2016–2018: Canyon//SRAM
- 2019–2021: Trek–Segafredo
Medal record
Women’s Cycling
Representing Germany
World Championships
Silver medal – second place	2006 Salzburg	Road race
Representing Velocio–SRAM
World Championships
Gold medal – first place	2012 Valkenburg	Team time trial
Gold medal – first place	2013 Florence	Team time trial
Gold medal – first place	2014 Ponferrada	Team time trial
Gold medal – first place	2015 Richmond	Team time trial
Representing Canyon//SRAM
World Championships
Gold medal – first place	2018 Innsbruck	Team time trial

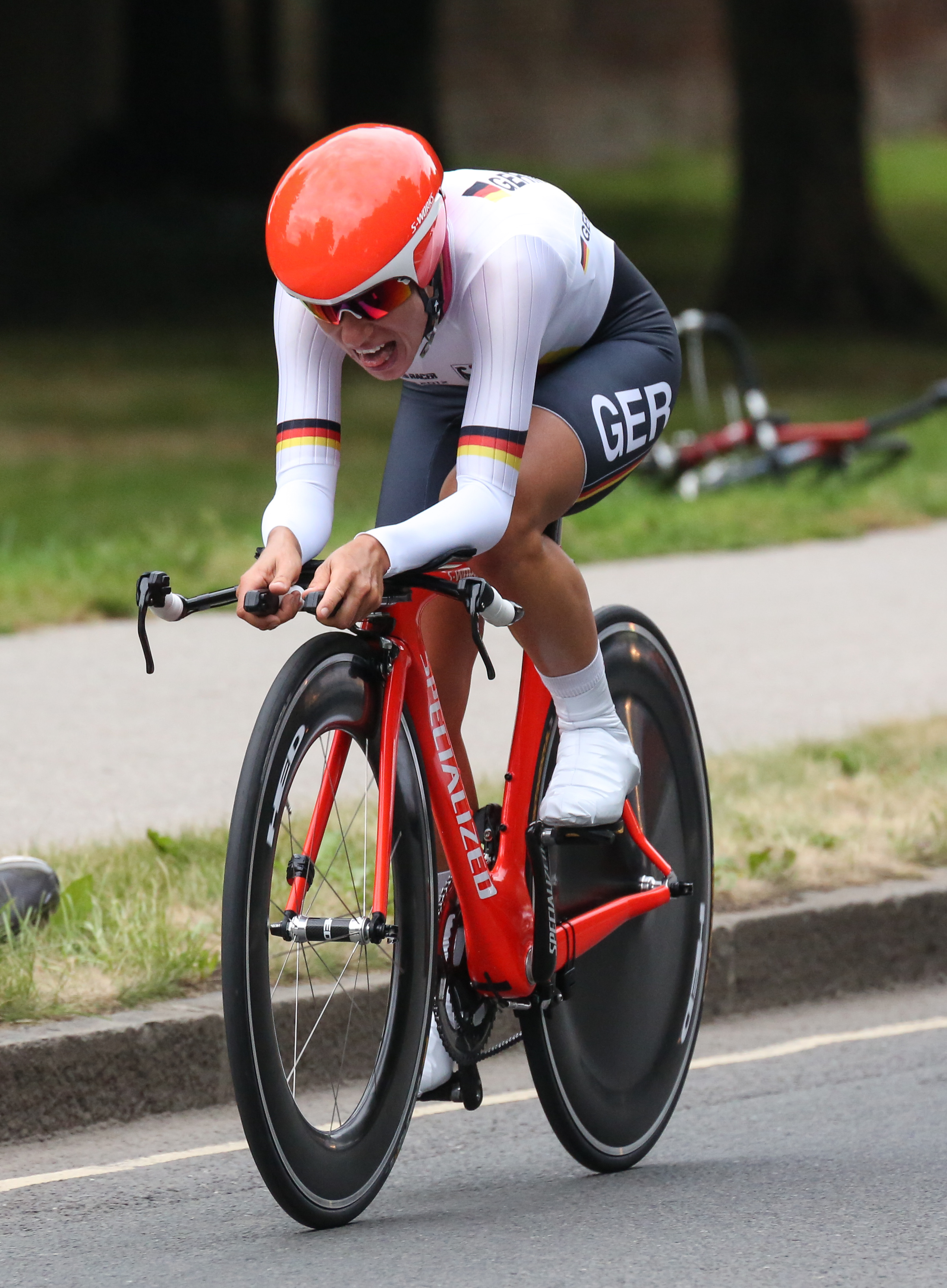
Trixi Worrack competing in the 2012 Olympics time trial in London

Beatrix "Trixi" Worrack (born 28 September 1981) is a German former professional road racing cyclist, who rode professionally between 2000 and 2021. The winner of the 2003 German National Road Race Championships, Worrack's career highlights included winning the 2005 Primavera Rosa (the women's Milan–San Remo), capturing the overall title at the 2004 Tour de l'Aude Cycliste Féminin and competing in the women's road race at five Summer Olympic Games between 2004 and 2020.

Prior to announcing her retirement in 2021, Worrack took a total of 47 wins during her career, including the general classification at the Tour of California, and the Tour of Qatar, stages of the Giro d'Italia Femminile and the Holland Ladies Tour, and she also placed second in the inaugural Tour of Flanders for Women in 2004. In addition she was part of five women's team time trial world championship winning squads. She spent the earlier part of her career as a team leader before shifting towards a role as a domestique and road captain in later years.

== Career ==
Born in Cottbus, Worrack took up the sport as a teenager, and after a couple of years with her first club competed at the 1998 UCI Road World Championships in Valkenburg aan de Geul, where she won the gold in the junior time trial. In 2006, Worrack was selected as the German women's cyclist of the year.

In November 2015 she was announced as part of the Canyon//SRAM team's inaugural squad for the 2016 season. In the 2016 edition of the Trofeo Alfredo Binda-Comune di Cittiglio, she suffered a ruptured kidney in a crash, leading to the kidney being removed. However she was able to return to competition and won the German National Time Trial Championships in June. She went on to compete for Germany at the 2016 Summer Olympics where she finished 43rd in the women's road race.

Worrack competed in her final professional race in October 2021 at The Women's Tour, having initially planned to leave the women's peloton after the inaugural running of the Paris–Roubaix Femmes a few days earlier. She had to postpone her final race by a few days due to injuries sustained by several of her Trek–Segafredo team-mates.

== Major results ==
1998
1st Time trial, UCI Junior Road World Championships
1999
UCI Junior Road World Championships

2nd Road race
3rd Time trial

2000
9th Overall Holland Ladies Tour
2001
1st Overall Vuelta a Mallorca de Feminas
1st Stage 7 Women's Challenge
1st Stage 4 Tour de Suisse Féminin
3rd Overall Thüringen Rundfahrt der Frauen
3rd La Flèche Wallonne Féminine
5th Rund um die Nürnberger Altstadt
2002
2nd Time trial, National Road Championships
2nd Overall Tour de Feminin-O cenu Českého Švýcarska
5th Overall Thüringen Rundfahrt der Frauen

1st Stage 2

2003
1st Road race, National Road Championships
2nd Overall Holland Ladies Tour
5th Overall Tour de l'Aude Cycliste Féminin

1st Young rider classification

7th Overall Gracia–Orlová
10th La Flèche Wallonne Féminine
2004
1st Overall Tour de l'Aude Cycliste Féminin

1st Young rider classification
1st Stages 3 & 8b

1st Overall Tour de Feminin-O cenu Českého Švýcarska
1st Overall Giro della Toscana Int. Femminile – Memorial Michela Fanini
2nd Time trial, National Road Championships
2nd Overall Holland Ladies Tour

1st Stage 4

2nd Tour of Flanders for Women
4th Road race, UCI Road World Championships
7th La Flèche Wallonne Féminine
8th Overall Gracia–Orlová

1st Stage 1

2005
1st Primavera Rosa
2nd Time trial, National Road Championships
2nd Overall Tour de l'Aude Cycliste Féminin

1st Stage 9

2nd Overall Emakumeen Bira

1st Stages 3b & 4

9th Overall Thüringen Rundfahrt der Frauen
10th Road race, UCI Road World Championships
2006
UCI Road World Championships

2nd Road race

2nd Overall Novilon Damesronde van Drenthe
2nd Overall Tour du Grand Montréal
2nd Overall Holland Ladies Tour
3rd Overall Women's Tour of New Zealand
3rd Overall Tour de l'Aude Cycliste Féminin
3rd Overall Thüringen Rundfahrt der Frauen
3rd La Flèche Wallonne Féminine
4th Open de Suède Vårgårda
5th Coupe du Monde Cycliste Féminine de Montréal
7th Sparkassen Giro
8th Grand Prix de Dottignies
9th Overall Giro del Trentino Alto Adige-Südtirol
9th UCI Road World Championships – Women's time trial
10th Tour de Berne
10th Lowland International Rotterdam Tour
2007
2nd Overall Tour de l'Aude Cycliste Féminin

1st Stage 8b

2nd Overall Tour du Grand Montréal
4th Overall Holland Ladies Tour
4th Tour of Flanders for Women
6th Overall Thüringen Rundfahrt der Frauen

1st Stage 5b

8th Australia World Cup
8th Coupe du Monde Cycliste Féminine de Montréal
9th Drentse 8 van Dwingeloo
2008
2nd Overall Tour de Feminin-O cenu Českého Švýcarska
2nd Overall Thüringen Rundfahrt der Frauen

1st Stage 6

2nd Overall Giro della Toscana Int. Femminile – Memorial Michela Fanini
3rd Overall Tour de l'Aude Cycliste Féminin
4th Overall Iurreta-Emakumeen Bira
5th Road race, UCI Road World Championships
5th Overall Women's Tour of New Zealand
6th Overall Holland Ladies Tour

1st Stage 2 (ITT)

8th Overall Giro del Trentino Alto Adige-Südtirol
10th Trofeo Alfredo Binda-Comune di Cittiglio
2009
1st Time trial, National Road Championships
1st Overall Gracia–Orlová
1st Stage 8 Giro d'Italia Femminile
2nd Overall Tour de l'Aude Cycliste Féminin

1st Stage 6

2nd Overall Tour du Grand Montréal
2nd Grand Prix de Dottignies
2nd Novilon Eurocup Ronde van Drenthe
3rd Tour de Berne
3rd Coupe du Monde Cycliste Féminine de Montréal
4th Overall Thüringen Rundfahrt der Frauen
4th Liberty Classic
6th Overall Holland Ladies Tour
7th Open de Suède Vårgårda
10th Overall Giro del Trentino Alto Adige-Südtirol
10th Drentse 8 van Dwingeloo
2010
1st Overall Tour de Feminin-O cenu Českého Švýcarska

1st Points classification
1st Stages 1, 2, 3 (ITT), 4 & 5

3rd Road race, National Road Championships
5th Liberty Classic
6th Overall Giro del Trentino Alto Adige-Südtirol
6th Overall Thüringen Rundfahrt der Frauen
7th Road race, UCI Road World Championships
8th Overall Holland Ladies Tour
10th Overall Tour de l'Aude Cycliste Féminin
2011
1st Stage 6 Giro della Toscana Int. Femminile – Memorial Michela Fanini
2nd Open de Suède Vårgårda TTT
4th Overall Trophée d'Or Féminin
5th Overall Iurreta-Emakumeen Bira
5th Durango-Durango Emakumeen Saria
2012
1st Team time trial (with Ellen van Dijk, Charlotte Becker, Amber Neben, Evelyn Stevens and Ina-Yoko Teutenberg)
1st Open de Suède Vårgårda TTT
National Road Championships

2nd Time trial
3rd Road race

2nd Overall Ladies Tour of Qatar

1st Stage 2

2nd Overall Gracia-Orlová

1st Stage 3

2nd Overall Thüringen Rundfahrt der Frauen

1st Stages 3 & 4 (ITT)

3rd Omloop Het Nieuwsblad
3rd Le Samyn des Dames
3rd Trofeo Alfredo Binda-Comune di Cittiglio
4th Overall Energiewacht Tour

1st Stage 4b (TTT)

4th Overall Holland Ladies Tour

1st Stage 2 (TTT)

5th Ronde van Drenthe
5th Open de Suède Vårgårda
7th Overall Emakumeen Euskal Bira
8th UCI Road World Championships – Women's time trial
8th GP de Plouay – Bretagne
9th Time trial, Olympic Games
10th Novilon Euregio Cup
2013
1st Team time trial (with Ellen van Dijk, Carmen Small, Evelyn Stevens, Katie Colclough and Lisa Brennauer)
National Road Championships

1st Road race
2nd Time trial

1st Open de Suède Vårgårda TTT
1st Stage 1 (TTT) Belgium Tour
2nd Classica Citta di Padova
5th UCI Road World Championships – Women's time trial
5th Overall Ladies Tour of Qatar
6th Overall Holland Ladies Tour

1st Stage 2 (TTT)

10th Omloop van het Hageland
2014
1st UCI Road World Championships – Women's team time trial
1st Open de Suède Vårgårda TTT
National Road Championships

2nd Time trial
2nd Road race

3rd Overall Energiewacht Tour
3rd Overall Auensteiner-Radsporttage
5th Overall Ladies Tour of Qatar
5th GP Comune di Cornaredo
7th Drentse 8 van Dwingeloo
9th Durango-Durango Emakumeen Saria
10th UCI Road World Championships – Women's time trial
2015
1st UCI Road World Championships – Women's team time trial
National Road Championships

1st Road race
3rd Time trial

1st Overall Tour of California
2nd Overall Energiewacht Tour

1st Stage 2a (TTT)

2nd Overall Gracia–Orlová
2nd Crescent Women World Cup Vårgårda TTT
4th Overall Ladies Tour of Qatar
9th Overall Holland Ladies Tour
9th Omloop Het Nieuwsblad
10th UCI Road World Championships – Women's time trial
2016
1st Time trial, National Road Championships
1st Overall Tour of Qatar
2nd UCI Road World Championships – Women's team time trial
3rd Ronde van Drenthe
7th UCI Road World Championships – Women's time trial
2017
1st Time trial, National Road Championships
3rd Crescent Vårgårda UCI Women's WorldTour TTT
4th Overall Thüringen Rundfahrt der Frauen
10th 947 Cycle Challenge
2018
1st Team time trial, UCI Road World Championships
2nd Time trial, National Road Championships
3rd Time trial, UEC European Road Championships
4th Overall BeNe Ladies Tour

1st Stage 2b (ITT)

7th Overall Healthy Ageing Tour
2019
1st Postnord UCI WWT Vårgårda West Sweden TTT
