= 2008 Open de Suède Vårgårda TTT =

2008 Open de Suède Vårgårda Team time trial
2008 UCI Women's Road World Cup, race 9 of 11

Race details
- Dates: 1 August 2008
- Stages: 1
- Distance: 32 km (20 mi)
- Winning time: 38' 56"

Results
	Winner	Cervélo–Lifeforce Pro Cycling Team
	Second	Team Columbia Women
	Third	Equipe Nürnberger Versicherung

The 2008 Open de Suède Vårgårda – team time trial was the first team time trial running on the Open de Suède Vårgårda. It was held on 1 August 2008 over a distance of 32 kilometres (19.9 miles) and was the ninth race of the 2008 UCI Women's Road World Cup season.

== Race ==
Top Girls-Fassa Bortolo-Raxy Line was the first of the thirteen teams to set off due to its lowly position on the World Cup overall standings. The team returned with a time of 44:27.5, giving the others something to aim at. Third team to start, Norway, caught its Scandinavian rival Finland in the closing stages to take more than a minute off the Top Girls time with 43:13.7. The first really fast time was posted by the Vrienden Van Het Platteland team, pushing it closer to the 40 minute mark with 40:52.9. The very next team, Team Flexpoint pushed it still lower though with 40:26.4. Despite being outstanding favourites, the Cervelo-Lifeforce team was – because of its position in the World Cup standings – fourth from last to go. The team blitzed around the course knocking all but a minute and a half off the Team Flexpoint time with an incredible 38:26.7. The last two teams to go – Equipe Nürnberger Versicherung and Columbia – were the only ones who looked capable of besting the Cervelo-Lifeforce time, but although they were both faster than Team Flexpoint, neither were able to come within a minute of the Swiss team. Equipe Nürnberger Versicherung finished three seconds quicker than Team Flexpoint to take a provisional second place, but Columbia were consistently faster all the way around and pushed them into third.

== General standings (top 10) ==
	Team	Cyclists	Time	World Cup points
1	Cervélo–Lifeforce Pro Cycling Team	Priska Doppmann (SUI)	38' 56"	35
1	Cervélo–Lifeforce Pro Cycling Team	Karin Thürig (SUI)	38' 56"	35
1	Cervélo–Lifeforce Pro Cycling Team	Christiane Soeder (AUT)	38' 56"	35
1	Cervélo–Lifeforce Pro Cycling Team	Carla Ryan (AUS)	38' 56"	35
2	Team Columbia Women	Luise Keller (GER)	+ 1' 14"	30
2	Team Columbia Women	Alexis Rhodes (AUS)	+ 1' 14"	30
2	Team Columbia Women	Ina-Yoko Teutenberg (GER)	+ 1' 14"	30
2	Team Columbia Women	Linda Villumsen (NZL)	+ 1' 14"	30
3	Equipe Nürnberger Versicherung	Charlotte Becker (GER)	+ 1' 27"	25
3	Equipe Nürnberger Versicherung	Suzanne de Goede (NED)	+ 1' 27"	25
3	Equipe Nürnberger Versicherung	Edita Pučinskaitė (LTU)	+ 1' 27"	25
3	Equipe Nürnberger Versicherung	Larissa Kleinmann (GER)	+ 1' 27"	25
4	Team Flexpoint	Loes Gunnewijk (NED)	+ 1' 30"	20
4	Team Flexpoint	Loes Markerink (NED)	+ 1' 30"	20
4	Team Flexpoint	Trine Schmidt (DEN)	+ 1' 30"	20
4	Team Flexpoint	Iris Slappendel (NED)	+ 1' 30"	20
5	Vrienden van het Platteland	Ellen van Dijk (NED)	+ 1' 56"	16
5	Vrienden van het Platteland	Liesbet De Vocht (BEL)	+ 1' 56"	16
5	Vrienden van het Platteland	An van Rie (BEL)	+ 1' 56"	16
5	Vrienden van het Platteland	Marit Huisman (NED)	+ 1' 56"	16
5	Vrienden van het Platteland	Annemiek van Vleuten (NED)	+ 1' 56"	16
5	Vrienden van het Platteland	Liesbeth Bakker (NED)	+ 1' 56"	16
6	AA-Drink Cycling Team		+ 2' 41"	15
7	Team DSB Bank		+ 2' 46"	14
8	Sweden		+ 3' 40"	13
9	Menikini–Selle Italia–Master Colors		+ 3' 49"	12
10	Ukraine		+ 4' 17"	11

Results from cqranking.com.
