= Claudia Lichtenberg =

German racing cyclist (born 1985)

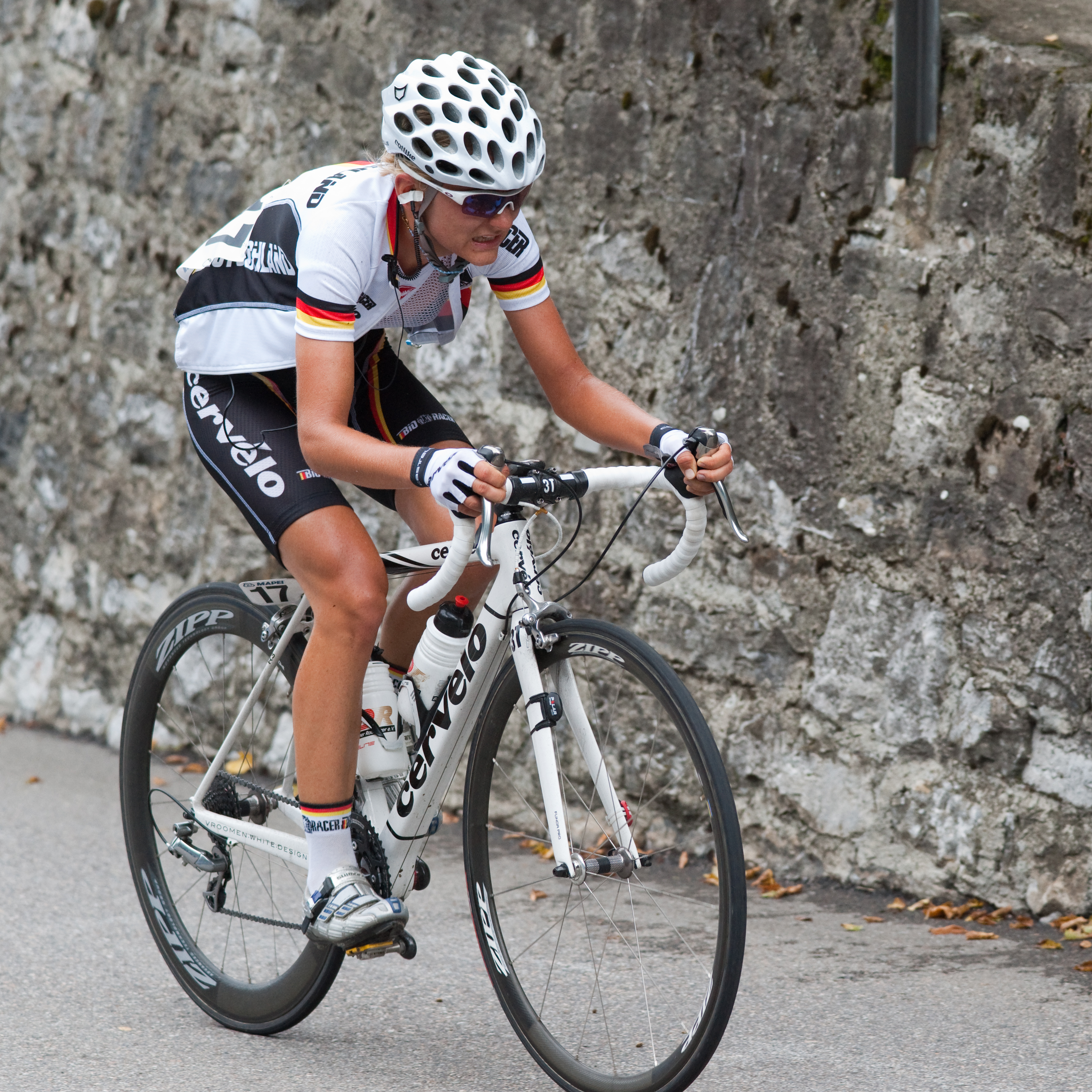
- During the 2009 UCI Road World Championships in Mendrisio.

Personal information
- Full name: Claudia Lichtenberg
- Born: Claudia Häusler; 17 November 1985 (age 40) Munich, West Germany
- Height: 169 cm (5 ft 7 in)
- Weight: 51 kg (112 lb)

Cycling career
- Sport: Cycling
- Current team: RSV Irschenberg
- Discipline: Road
- Role: Rider (retired); Coach
- Rider type: Climber

Amateur team
- 2019: RSV Irschenberg

Professional teams
- 2006–2007: Equipe Nürnberger Versicherung
- 2009–2010: Cervélo TestTeam
- 2011: Diadora–Pasta Zara
- 2012: Orica–AIS
- 2013: Team TIBCO–To The Top
- 2014: Giant–Shimano
- 2015–2016: Team Liv–Plantur
- 2017: Wiggle High5

Managerial team
- 2018–: RSV Irschenberg

Major wins
- Stage races Giro d'Italia Femminile (2009) Tour de l'Aude (2009) Iurreta-Emakumeen Bira (2010) Giro della Toscana (2013) La Route de France (2014)

Claudia Lichtenberg (née Häusler; born 17 November 1985 in Munich) is a German former professional cyclist, who now works as a coach for German amateur team RSV Irschenberg.

Born in Munich, Lichtenberg won the Tour de l'Aude in 2009, a race which, at the time, was called the "women's Tour de France", and also the Giro d'Italia Femminile.

She competed for Germany at the 2016 Summer Olympics where she finished in 31st place in the women's road race.

On the first day of the 2017 Giro d'Italia Femminile, Lichtenberg announced her retirement from professional road racing at the end of the 2017 season written in a Wiggle High5 rider blog.

== Personal life ==
She married German former professional cyclist Christian Lichtenberg in mid-2014 and began racing under her married name.

== Major results ==
2005
1st Young rider classification, Giro del Trentino Alto Adige-Südtirol
6th Overall Giro della Toscana Int. Femminile – Memorial Michela Fanini
2006
1st Road race, National Road Championships
4th Overall Giro della Toscana Int. Femminile – Memorial Michela Fanini
6th Overall Giro del Trentino Alto Adige-Südtirol
8th Overall Tour de l'Aude Cycliste Féminin
9th Sparkassen Giro
2007
National Road Championships

1st Mountain race
2nd Road race

1st Mountains classification, Tour du Grand Montréal
4th Road race, UEC European Under-23 Road Championships
5th Overall Giro della Toscana Int. Femminile – Memorial Michela Fanini
10th Coupe du Monde Cycliste Féminine de Montréal
2008
1st Großer Volvo Preis Villingen-Schwenningen
1st Allgäuer Straßenpreis
3rd Overall Giro del Trentino Alto Adige-Südtirol
3rd Overall Giro d'Italia Femminile

1st Stage 6

7th Overall Tour de l'Aude Cycliste Féminin

1st Young rider classification

7th Overall Iurreta-Emakumeen Bira
2009
1st Overall Giro d'Italia Femminile

1st Stage 7

1st Overall Tour de l'Aude Cycliste Féminin
1st Rund um Schönaich
1st Allgäuer Straßenpreis
2nd Overall Iurreta-Emakumeen Bira
3rd La Flèche Wallonne Féminine
6th Overall Giro del Trentino Alto Adige-Südtirol
2010
1st Overall Iurreta-Emakumeen Bira

1st Mountains classification

3rd Overall Giro del Trentino Alto Adige-Südtirol
4th Overall Giro d'Italia Femminile
4th Overall Tour de l'Aude Cycliste Féminin

1st Stage 1 (TTT)

10th Valkenburg Hills Classic
2011
2nd Overall Giro della Toscana Int. Femminile – Memorial Michela Fanini
5th Overall Trophée d'Or Féminin
7th Overall Thüringen Rundfahrt der Frauen
2012
1st Rund um Schönaich
1st Allgäuer Straßenpreis
1st Max Ernst Gedächtnisrennen
2nd Open de Suède Vårgårda TTT
6th Overall The Exergy Tour

1st Stage 4

8th Overall Giro d'Italia Femminile
10th Overall Emakumeen Euskal Bira
2013
1st Overall Giro della Toscana Int. Femminile – Memorial Michela Fanini
1st Overall Joe Martin Stage Race

1st Prologue

1st Stage 6 North Star Grand Prix
2nd Overall Cascade Cycling Classic

1st Stage 1

3rd Overall Giro d'Italia Femminile
3rd Philadelphia Cycling Classic
5th Overall Holland Ladies Tour
6th Chrono Gatineau
8th Le Samyn des Dames
2014
1st Overall La Route de France

1st Stage 1

4th Overall Holland Ladies Tour
5th Overall Emakumeen Euskal Bira
6th Overall Giro d'Italia Femminile
9th La Flèche Wallonne Féminine
2015
2nd Road race, National Road Championships
3rd Overall La Route de France
5th GP de Plouay
2016
2nd Overall Giro del Trentino Alto Adige-Südtirol
2nd Overall Trophée d'Or Féminin

1st Stage 5

4th Overall Giro d'Italia Femminile
6th Overall Festival Luxembourgeois du cyclisme féminin Elsy Jacobs
7th Overall Emakumeen Euskal Bira
8th Strade Bianche Women
9th Tour of Flanders for Women
10th Overall Auensteiner–Radsporttage
2017
8th Overall Setmana Ciclista Valenciana
9th Overall Giro d'Italia Femminile
