= Daniela Fusar Poli =

Italian cyclist

Personal information
- Born: 17 October 1984 (age 41) Legnano, Italy

Cycling career
- Sport: Cycling
- Discipline: Road cycling

Professional teams
- 2004–2005: Nobili Rubinetterie-Menikini Cogeas
- 2006–2007: Safi-Pasta Zara-Manhattan

Daniela Fusar Poli (born 17 October 1984) is a road cyclist from Italy. She represented her nation at the 2004 UCI Road World Championships. She also represented Italy at the 2006 European Road Championships finishing 11th in the under-23 road race.
