= Swift Racing =

Chinese rowing boat manufacturer

- Industry: Boat manufacturer
- Founded: 2005
- Founders: Gareth Gruenbaum and Tim Yang
- Headquarters: China
- Area served: Worldwide
- Products: Rowing boats
- Website: swiftracing.com/about-us/

Swift Racing is a Chinese manufacturer of boats. They specialise in racing shells for the sport of rowing.

== History ==
Swift Racing was founded in 2005 by Gareth Greuenbaum, a volunteer rowing coach, and Tim Yang a Chinese boat sales manager, with the goal of making rowing boats more affordable and accessible. As of 2025 they are the 2nd largest manufacturer of rowing shells, and an official supplier of rowing shells to World Rowing Swift Racing is also the Official Licensee for World Rowing merchandise for Asia.

=== International Representation ===
While Swift Racing is predominantly a affordable racing shell manufacturer, they have also supplied boats to high level competitions. Including providing boats for the USRowing Paralympic team for the 2015 World Rowing Championships.

As well as partnering with British Rowing to develop coastal rowing boats for the 2028 Summer Olympics.

== See also ==
- Racing Shells
