= Susanne Ljungskog =

Swedish cyclist

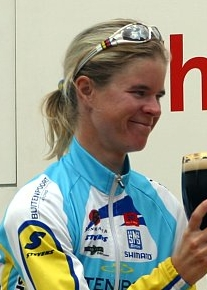
- Ljungskog on the podium at the 2005 Thüringen Rundfahrt der Frauen

Personal information
- Full name: Susanne Ljungskog
- Born: 16 March 1976 (age 50) Halmstad, Sweden
- Height: 1.71 m (5 ft 7 in)
- Weight: 57 kg (126 lb)

Cycling career
- Sport: Cycling
- Current team: Menikini–Selle Italia
- Discipline: Road
- Role: Rider
- Rider type: All-rounder

Professional teams
- 1999: The Greenery Grisley
- 2000: Farm Frites – Hartol
- 2001–2002: Vlaanden – T Interim
- 2003: Bik – Powerplate
- 2004: Team S.A.T.S.
- 2005–2007: Team Flexpoint
- 2008: Menikini–Selle Italia

Major wins
- Stage races Giro della Toscana (2002, 2003, 2005) Holland Ladies Tour (2003, 2006) Tour de l'Aude Cycliste Féminin (2007, 2008) Emakumeen Bira (2007) One day races & Classics World Road Race Champion (2002, 2003) National Road Race Champion (1994, 1996–1998, 2004–2006) National Time Trial Champion (2006) Primavera Rosa (2001) Open de Suède Vårgårda (2006)
Medal record
Representing Sweden
Women's Road bicycle racing
World Championships
| Gold medal – first place | 2002 | Women's Road Race |
| Gold medal – first place | 2003 | Women's Road Race |

Susanne Ljungskog (born 16 March 1976) is a Swedish former cyclist. As a four-time Olympian (1996, 2000, 2004 and 2008), she won the world road race championship in 2002 and 2003. The same years, she was UCI points champion. She has also won two World Cup races.

Ljungskog received the Svenska Dagbladet Gold Medal in 2002.

== Major results ==
1994
1st National Road Race Championships
2nd Drei Tagen von Pattensen
3rd Overall Thüringen Rundfahrt der Frauen
3rd GP Scandinavia Time Trial
3rd Tjejtrampet – 3rd place

1996
National Road Championships

1st Road Race
2nd Time Trial

1997
National Road Championships

1st Road Race
3rd Time Trial

4th European U23 Road Race Championships

1998
National Road Championships

1st Road Race
2nd Time Trial

European U23 Road Championships

1st Road Race

1st Tjejtrampet
2nd Overall Thüringen Rundfahrt der Frauen

1st Stage 1

2nd Overall Eurosport Tour of Poland

2 stage wins

5th Overall Tour de l'Aude Cycliste Féminin

1st Stage 1

1999
3rd Overall Holland Ladies Tour

2000
2nd Luba Classic
3rd Overall Holland Ladies Tour
3rd Overall Vuelta International a Majorca

1st Stage 1

5th Tjejtrampet

2001
1st GP Suisse Féminin
1st Primavera Rosa
2nd Montréal
3rd Overall Tour de l'Aude Cycliste Féminin
6th Overall

1st Stage 1 Grande Boucle

2002
1st UCI Road World Championships Road Race
1st Overall Giro della Toscana

3 stage wins

1st UCI Road World Cup Points Championship
2nd Overall Grande Boucle

1st Stage 1

2nd Overall Trophée Féminin Méditerranéen

1st Stage 1

3rd Overall Tour de Snowy
3rd GP de Plouay (World Cup)
4th Overall Emakumeen Bira

1st Points classification
1st Stage 1

2003
1st UCI Road World Championships Road Race
1st Overall Giro della Toscana
1st Overall Holland Ladies Tour
1st UCI Road World Cup Points Championship
2nd Overall

1st Stage 1 Thüringen Rundfahrt der Frauen

2nd Overall Giro del Trentino
3rd Overall Tour de l'Aude Cycliste Féminin

1st Stage 1

3rd Overall Vuelta a Castilla y León
3rd Rotterdam Tour

2004
1st National Road Race Championships
1st Stage 1 Thüringen Rundfahrt der Frauen
5th Overall Giro del Trentino
9th Overall Tour de l'Aude Cycliste Féminin

1st Stage 1

2005
1st National Road Race Championships
1st Overall Giro della Toscana

1st Stage 1

1st Castilla y Leon
2nd Overall Holland Ladies Tour

2 stage wins

2nd Overall Thüringen Rundfahrt der Frauen
2nd Overall Gracia–Orlová

1st Stage 1

2nd Overall Geelong Tour
2nd UCI Road World Cup Points Championship
2nd GP Wales
2nd Ronde van Vlaaneren
6th Overall Emakumeen Bira

1st Stage 1

2006
National Road Championships

1st Road Race
1st Time Trial

1st Overall Holland Ladies Tour
1st Open de Suède Vårgårda
2nd Overall Tour de l'Aude Cycliste Féminin
3rd Overall Giro d'Italia Femminile

2007
1st Overall Tour de l'Aude Cycliste Féminin
1st Overall Emakumeen Bira

1st Stage 1

2008
1st Overall Tour de l'Aude Cycliste Féminin

1st Stage 4

7th UCI Road World Championships – Women's time trial

Sporting positions
| Preceded by Per Elofsson | Svenska Dagbladet Gold Medal; 2002 | Succeeded by Carolina Klüft |
