= Giro della Toscana Int. Femminile – Memorial Michela Fanini =

Women's bicycle race in Italy

Race details
- Date: Late August / September
- Region: Italy
- English name: Tour of Tuscany
- Discipline: Road
- Type: Stage race
- Web site: www.michelafanini.com

History
- First edition: 1995
- Editions: 27 (as of 2022)
- First winner: Imelda Chiappa (ITA)
- Most wins: Susanne Ljungskog (SWE) (3 wins)
- Most recent: Agnieszka Skalniak-Sójka (POL)

The Giro Toscana Int. Femminile – Memorial Michela Fanini is annual elite women's road bicycle racing stage race held in Italy since 1995.

During the 2013 race, 63 of the 112 riders refused to compete in the fourth and final stage of the race due to safety concerns, including having to race in open car traffic without sufficient police protection. After briefly listening to the riders' complaints at a meeting before the fourth stage, the organizer, Brunello Fanani, told the protesting riders and team representatives to "go home." Among the protesting riders were Italy's two top women's riders, Elisa Longo Borghini and Giorgia Bronzini, and Marianne Vos, the overall leader after the third stage. The race returned in 2014 but was reduced to two stages plus a prologue time trial, and its UCI race classification was downgraded from 2.1 to 2.2.

== Past winners ==
Year	Country	Rider	Team
1995	Italy	Imelda Chiappa	
1995	Italy	Greta Zocca	
1996	Switzerland	Barbara Heeb	
1997	Italy	Imelda Chiappa	
1998	Italy	Valeria Cappellotto	
1999	Lithuania	Edita Pučinskaitė	
2000	Belarus	Sinaida Stahurskaja	
2001	Switzerland	Nicole Brändli	
2002	Sweden	Susanne Ljungskog	Vlaanden–T Interim
2003	Sweden	Susanne Ljungskog	Bik–Powerplate
2004	Germany	Trixi Worrack	Equipe Nürnberger Versicherung
2005	Sweden	Susanne Ljungskog	Buitenpoort - Flexpoint Team
2006	Russia	Svetlana Bubnenkova	Fenixs–Colnago
2007	Italy	Noemi Cantele	Bigla Cycling Team
2008	Germany	Judith Arndt	Team Columbia Women
2009	Lithuania	Diana Žiliūtė	Safi–Pasta Zara–Titanedi
2010	Germany	Judith Arndt	Team HTC–Columbia Women
2011	United States	Megan Guarnier	Team TIBCO–To The Top
2012	Poland	Małgorzata Jasińska	MCipollini–Giambenini–Gauss
2013	Germany	Claudia Häusler	Team TIBCO–To The Top
2014	United States	Shelley Olds	Alé–Cipollini
2015	Poland	Małgorzata Jasińska	Alé–Cipollini
2016	South Africa	Ashleigh Moolman	Cervélo–Bigla Pro Cycling
2017	South Africa	Ashleigh Moolman	Cervélo–Bigla Pro Cycling
2018	Italy	Soraya Paladin	Alé–Cipollini
2019	Cuba	Arlenis Sierra	Astana
2020	No race due to COVID-19 pandemic		
2021	Cuba	Arlenis Sierra	A.R. Monex
2022	Poland	Agnieszka Skalniak-Sójka	ATOM Deweloper Posciellux.pl Wrocław
