= Tour de l'Aude Cycliste Féminin =

Women's road cycling event in France

Race details
- Region: France
- Discipline: Road
- Type: Stage race
- Web site: www.tour-aude-cycliste-feminin.com

History
- First edition: 1985
- Editions: 26 (as of 2010)
- First winner: Janelle Parks (USA)
- Most wins: 6 riders with 2 wins
- Most recent: Emma Pooley (GBR)

The Tour de l'Aude Cycliste Féminin was the longest running UCI event on the women's elite road cycle racing calendar. It had been held annually in the Aude region of south-central France since 1985 until its cancellation after the 2010 edition. The race began when Jean Thomas, who organized men's events, turned to a major women's tour. The initial race was four days long around one city. The race grew in length and prestige until it attracted many of the top riders in the world. By 2006, the race was 10 days long. Following Thomas' death, the race was organized by his daughter, Anne-Marie Thomas. However, after the 2010 race, a lack of sponsorship led to the race's cancellation.

== Leaders' jerseys ==
Race leaders in 6 different categories receive colored jerseys to wear while racing. Jerseys are awarded at the completion of each stage and are worn until a new racer is awarded the jersey. The colors for the different competition leaders are as follows:

General classification leader
Points classification leader
Mountains classification leader
Under-23 rider classification leader
Sprints classification leader
Stage-winner's jersey

== General classification podiums ==
Year	Distance [km]	NoS	1st place	team	2nd place	team	3rd place	team
1985			Janelle Parks (USA)		Denise Burton (GBR)		Imelda Chiappa (ITA)	
1986			Phillis Hines (USA)		Virginie Lafargue (FRA)		A. Yakovleva (URS)	
1987			Maria Canins (ITA)		T. Poliakova (URS)		Jeannie Longo (FRA)	
1988			Jeannie Longo (FRA)		Maria Canins (ITA)		Lisa Brambani (GBR)	
1989			Cécile Odin (FRA)		N. Kibardina (URS)		S. Neil (CAN)	
1990			Catherine Marsal (FRA)		Leontien van Moorsel (NED)		D. Kelly (CAN)	
1991			Leontien van Moorsel (NED)		Catherine Marsal (FRA)		Inga Thompson (USA)	
1992			Julie Young (USA)		Paola Turcutto (ITA)		Inga Thompson (USA)	
1993			Jeannie Longo (FRA) (2)		Leontien van Moorsel (NED)		Marion Clignet (FRA)	
1994			Catherine Marsal (FRA) (2)		Rasa Polikevičiūtė (LIT)		Aleksandra Koliaseva (RUS)	
1995			Valentina Polkhanova (RUS)		Rasa Polikevičiūtė (LIT)		Svetlana Bubnenkova (RUS)	
1996			Aleksandra Koliaseva (RUS)		Svetlana Bubnenkova (RUS)		Catherine Marsal (FRA)	
1997			Linda Jackson (CAN)		Svetlana Bubnenkova (RUS)		Heidi van de Vijver (BEL)	
1998			Fabiana Luperini (ITA)		Valentina Polkhanova (RUS)		Catherine Marsal (FRA)	
1999			Lyne Bessette (CAN)		Hanka Kupfernagel (GER)		Heidi van de Vijver (BEL)	
2000			Hanka Kupfernagel (GER)		Mirjam Melchers (NED)		Geraldine Loewenguth (FRA)	
2001			Lyne Bessette (CAN) (2)		Judith Arndt (GER)		Susanne Ljungskog (SWE)	
2002			Judith Arndt (GER)		Valentina Polkhanova (RUS)		Edita Pučinskaitė (LIT)	
2003			Judith Arndt (GER) (2)	Equipe Nürnberger Versicherung	Lyne Bessette (CAN)		Susanne Ljungskog (SWE)	
2004			Trixi Worrack (GER)	Equipe Nürnberger Versicherung	Judith Arndt (GER)	Equipe Nürnberger Versicherung	Kim Bruckner (USA)	T-Mobile Women
2005			Amber Neben (USA)	Buitenpoort - Flexpoint Team	Trixi Worrack (GER)	Equipe Nürnberger Versicherung	Kristin Armstrong (USA)	USA National Team
2006			Amber Neben (USA) (2)	Buitenpoort - Flexpoint Team	Susanne Ljungskog (SWE)	Buitenpoort - Flexpoint Team	Trixi Worrack (GER)	Equipe Nürnberger Versicherung
2007			Susanne Ljungskog (SWE)	Team Flexpoint	Trixi Worrack (GER)	Equipe Nürnberger Versicherung	Judith Arndt (GER)	T-Mobile Women
2008			Susanne Ljungskog (SWE) (2)	Menikini–Selle Italia	Judith Arndt (GER)	Team High Road Women	Trixi Worrack (GER)	Equipe Nürnberger Versicherung
2009			Claudia Häusler (GER)	Cervélo TestTeam	Trixi Worrack (GER)	Equipe Nürnberger Versicherung	Marianne Vos (NED)	DSB Bank
2010			Emma Pooley (GBR)	Cervélo TestTeam	Mara Abbott (USA)	USA National Team	Emma Johansson (SWE)	Red Sun Cycling Team
