= Selle Italia–Ghezzi =

Italian cycling team

Team information
- UCI code: NRG (2004); NMC (2005–2006); MSG (2007); MSI (2008–2009)
- Registered: Italy
- Founded: 2004
- Disbanded: 2009
- Discipline: Road
- Status: UCI Women's Team

Team name history
- 2004 2005–2006 2007 2008 2009: Nobili Rubinetterie–Guerciotti; Nobili Rubinetterie–Menikini Cogeas; Menikini–Selle Italia–Gysko; Menikini–Selle Italia–Master Colors; Selle Italia–Ghezzi

Selle Italia–Ghezzi (UCI team code: MSI) was an Italian professional cycling team, which competed in elite road bicycle racing events such as the UCI Women's Road World Cup. Major wins by the team include the Giro d'Italia Femminile in 2006 and 2008, and the Tour de l'Aude Cycliste Féminin in 2008.

== Major wins ==
2004
GP Liberazione, Olga Slyusareva
Stage 1 Tour de l'Aude Cycliste Féminin, Alison Wright
Stage 7 Giro d'Italia Femminile, Olga Slyusareva

2005
Berner Rundfahrt, Edita Pučinskaitė
Stage 4 Tour du Grand Montréal, Daniela Poli
Stage 4 Giro del Trentino Alto Adige-Südtirol, Edita Pučinskaitė
GP Carnevale d'Europa, Modesta Vžesniauskaitė
Stage 3 Internationale Thüringen Rundfahrt der Frauen, Joanne Kiesanowski
Stage 5 Internationale Thüringen Rundfahrt der Frauen, Edita Pučinskaitė
Overall Giro di San Marino, Modesta Vžesniauskaitė

Stage 2, Modesta Vžesniauskaitė

Overall Tour Cycliste Féminin Ardèche Sud Rhône-Alpes, Edita Pučinskaitė

Stage 1b, Edita Pučinskaitė

Overall Vuelta Ciclista Femenina a El Salvador, Edita Pučinskaitė

Prologue, Stages 1 & 2, Edita Pučinskaitė
Stage 3, Sigrid Corneo

2006
Stage 3 Gracia–Orlová, Olivia Gollan
Stage 2 Tour du Grand Montréal, Olivia Gollan
Overall Giro d'Italia Femminile, Edita Pučinskaitė

Stage 5, Marta Vilajosana Andreu
Stage 10, Edita Pučinskaitė

Overall Tour Cycliste Féminin Ardèche Sud Rhône-Alpes

Stages 1, 2b & 5, Edita Pučinskaitė
Stage 2a, Silvia Valsecchi

Stage 1 Vuelta Ciclista Femenina a El Salvador, Olivia Gollan
Stage 3 Vuelta Ciclista Femenina a El Salvador, Emanuela Azzini
Stage 5 Vuelta Ciclista Femenina a El Salvador, Evelyn García
Grand Prix de Santa Ana, Olivia Gollan

2007
Stage 5 Tour de l'Aude Cycliste Féminin, Fabiana Luperini
Coupe du Monde Cycliste Féminine de Montréal
Overall Tour Féminin en Limousin, Sigrid Corneo

Prologue, Silvia Valsecchi
Stage 1, Sigrid Corneo
Stage 3, Olivia Gollan

Stage 1 La Route de France Féminine, Rochelle Gilmore
Stage 3 & 4a La Route de France Féminine, Dorte Lohse Rasmussen
Stages 4 & 5 Tour Cycliste Féminin International de l'Ardèche, Fabiana Luperini

2008
Berner Rundfahrt, Susanne Ljungskog
Overall Tour de l'Aude Cycliste Féminin, Susanne Ljungskog

Stage 4, Susanne Ljungskog

Overall Tour de PEI, Kori Kelley-Seehafer

Stages 1, 3 & 5, Rochelle Gilmore
Stage 2 (ITT), Kori Kelley-Seehafer

Overall Giro del Trentino Alto Adige-Südtirol, Fabiana Luperini

Stage 2, Fabiana Luperini

Overall Giro d'Italia Femminile, Fabiana Luperini

Stages 4 & 7, Fabiana Luperini

Open de Suède Vårgårda, Kori Kelley-Seehafer
GP de Plouay – Bretagne, Fabiana Luperini

2009
Stage 2 Gracia–Orlová, Fabiana Luperini
Stage 6 Internationale Thüringen Rundfahrt der Frauen, Fabiana Luperini

== National champions ==
2005
Japan Road Race, Miho Oki

2006
Japan Road Race, Miho Oki
Japan Time Trial, Miho Oki
El Salvador Road Race, Evelyn García
El Salvador Time Trial, Evelyn García
Lithuania Time Trial, Edita Pučinskaitė
Italy Time Trial, Silvia Valsecchi
2007
Japan Road Race, Miho Oki
Japan Time Trial, Miho Oki
Oceania Road Race, Rochelle Gilmore

2008
Japan Road Race, Miho Oki
Italy Road Race, Fabiana Luperini

2009
Pan American Time Trial, Alessandra Giuseppina Grassi
Slovenia Road Race, Sigrid Corneo
