= Ina-Yoko Teutenberg =

German racing cyclist

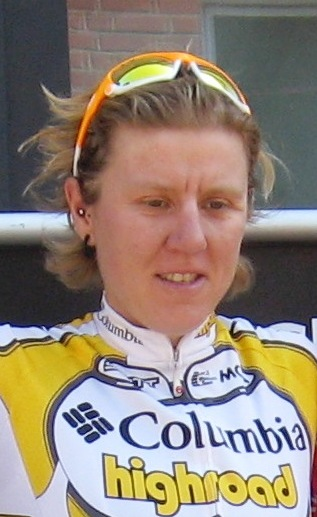
- Teutenberg at the Cologne Classic in 2009.

Personal information
- Full name: Ina-Yoko Teutenberg
- Born: 28 October 1974 (age 51): Düsseldorf, West Germany; (now Germany)

Cycling career
- Sport: Cycling
- Current team: Lidl–Trek
- Discipline: Road
- Role: Rider (retired); Directeur sportif
- Rider type: Sprinter

Professional teams
- 2000: Red Bull Frankfurt
- 2001–2003: Saturn Cycling Team
- 2005–2013: Team T-Mobile Women

Managerial teams
- 2014–2015: USA Cycling
- 2016–2018: Rally Cycling
- 2019–: Trek–Segafredo
- 2019–: USA Cycling
Medal record
Women's road cycling
World Championships
Representing Germany
Bronze medal – third place	2011 Copenhagen	Women's road race
Representing Team Specialized–lululemon
Gold medal – first place	2012 Valkenburg	Team Time Trial

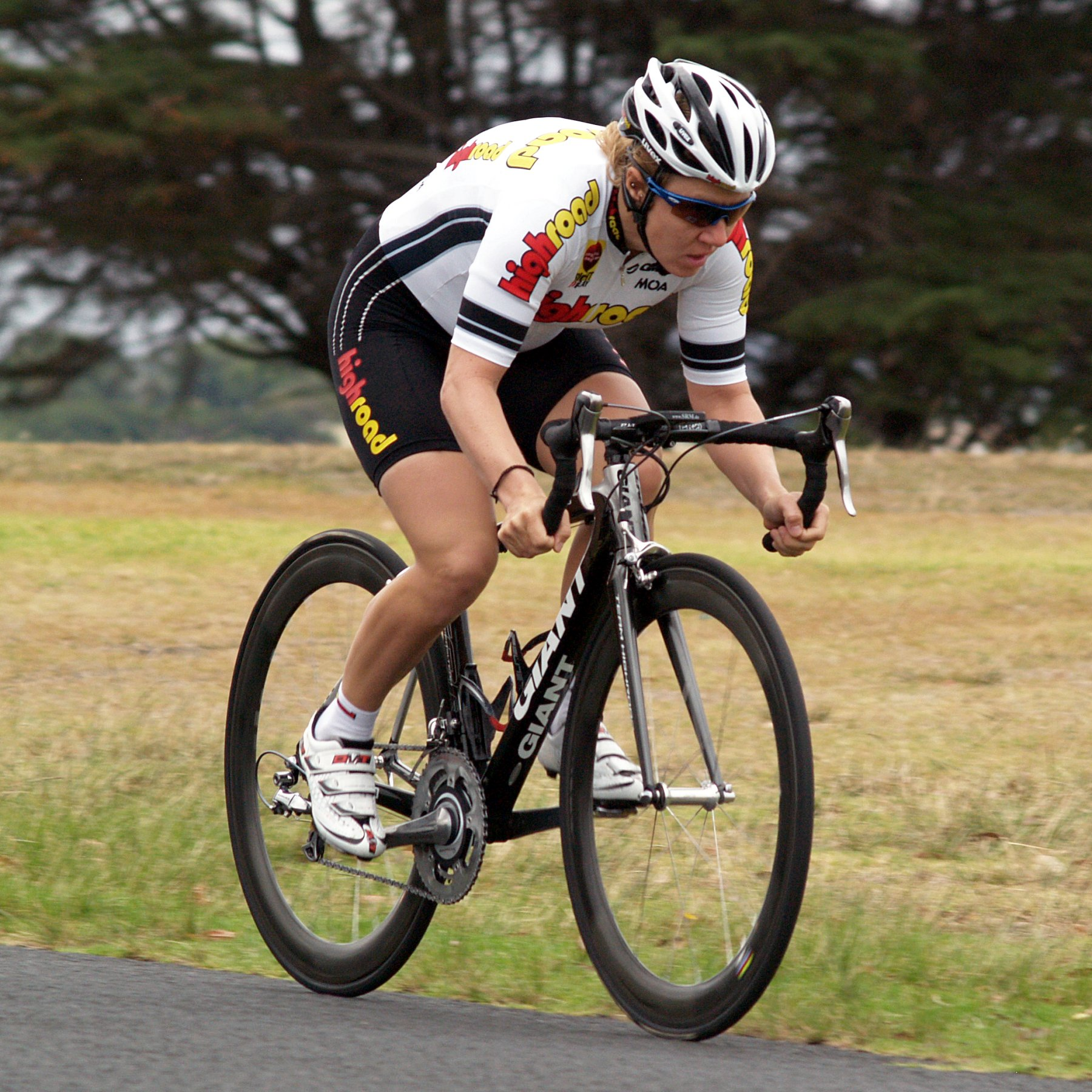
Teutenberg riding the time trial stage of the 2008 Geelong Tour in Australia

Ina-Yoko Teutenberg (born 28 October 1974) is a German former road bicycle racer, who competed professionally between 2000 and 2013 for the Red Bull Frankfurt, Saturn Cycling Team and Specialized–lululemon teams. She took over 200 wins during her career, including 11 stages of the Giro Rosa, the 2009 Tour of Flanders, and being part of the Team Specialized–lululemon team that won the World Team Time Trial Championship in 2012. She now works as a directeur sportif for UCI Women's Team Lidl–Trek.

== Career ==
Born in Düsseldorf, West Germany, Teutenberg began racing bicycles at age 6, alongside her two brothers Sven Teutenberg and Lars Teutenberg. She competed for Germany at the 2000 and 2012 Summer Olympics. Teutenberg retired from competition in 2013, after suffering concussion in a serious accident that year.

After her retirement, she worked with USA Cycling on a temporary basis, directing their junior men's and women's programmes in Europe, before co-directing Rally Cycling's women's team. In August 2018, Trek Bicycle Corporation announced that Teutenberg would be appointed as head director of their new women's team, Trek–Segafredo, for its debut in 2019. On 30 May 2019 it was announced that Teutenberg would become the Women's Road Sports Director for the World Championships and Olympic Games, starting her role at the World Championships that year.

== Personal life ==
She was one of 23 openly LGBT Olympians at the London Games.

Her nephew Tim Torn and niece Lea Lin, both childrens of Lars, are also professional cyclists.

== Major results ==
1993
1st Points race, National Track Championships
1996
1st Overall Thüringen Rundfahrt der Frauen
1997
1st Points race, National Track Championships
1998
1st Stage 4 RaboSter Zeeuwsche Eilanden
1st Stage 4 Women's Challenge
Holland Ladies Tour

1st Stages 4 & 5

1999
Women's Challenge

1st Stages 7 & 12

2000
Women's Challenge

1st Stages 8 & 9

2nd Overall Holland Ladies Tour

1st Stage 5a

2nd Primavera Rosa (ITA) (World Cup)
2001
1st Stage 3 Thüringen Rundfahrt der Frauen
Women's Challenge

1st Stages 10 & 13

1st Stage 4 Tour of the Gila
1st Clarendon Cup
2002
1st Stage 3 Holland Ladies Tour
1st Stage 5 Thüringen Rundfahrt der Frauen
Tour de l'Aude

1st Stages 1, 3, 4 & 5b

1st Clarendon Cup
2003
Tour de l'Aude

1st Stages 4b & 9

1st Stage 4 Solano Bicycle Classic
Redlands Bicycle Classic

1st Stages 1 & 4

1st Stage 4 Tour of the Gila
Tour de Toona

1st Stages 2 & 7

1st Stage 5 Holland Ladies Tour
2005
Valley of the Sun Stage Race

1st Stages 2 & 3

Redlands Bicycle Classic

1st Stages 2 & 3

1st Stage 3 Tour of the Gila
1st Richmond Cycling Classic
1st Liberty Classic
Tour de Toona

1st Stages 2 & 5

1st Stage 4a Holland Ladies Tour
2006
2nd Overall UCI Women's Road World Cup
1st Geelong World Cup
1st Stage 4 Geelong Women's Tour
Tour of New Zealand

1st Stages 2 & 3

1st Stage 1 Damesronde van Drenthe
Tour de l'Aude

1st Stages 5 & 10

1st Stage 4 Krasna Lipa Tour Feminine
1st Lowland International Rotterdam Tour
Holland Ladies Tour

1st Stages 2 & 3

1st Stage 4b Giro della Toscana Int. Femminile – Memorial Michela Fanini
1st Commerce Bank Triple Crown of Cycling
1st Reading Classic
2007
Geelong Women's Tour

1st Stages 2 & 3

Tour of New Zealand

1st Stages 1 & 6

1st Stage 2 Redlands Bicycle Classic
1st Stage 9 Tour de l'Aude
Commerce Bank Triple Crown of Cycling

1st Commerce Bank Lancaster Classic
1st Commerce Bank Reading Classic
1st Commerce Bank Liberty Classic Philadelphia

1st Stage 3 RaboSter Zeeuwsche Eilanden
Giro d'Italia Femminile

1st Stages 4 & 7

Trophée d'Or Féminin

1st Stages 4 & 5

3rd 2007 Novilon Internationale Damesronde van Drenthe
2008
1st Stage 6 Tour of New Zealand
1st Central Valley Classic
1st Drentse 8 van Dwingeloo
1st Stage 4 Gracia–Orlová
Tour de l'Aude

1st Stages 5 & 8

1st Commerce Bank Allentown Classic
1st Commerce Bank Reading Classic
1st Commerce Bank Liberty Classic Philadelphia
1st Overall RaboSter Zeeuwsche Eilanden

1st Stages 2 & 3

Giro d'Italia Femminile

1st Stages 1, 2, 3 & 8

La Route de France

1st Prologue & Stage 1

2nd Overall Holland Ladies Tour

1st Stages 1, 4 & 6

Giro della Toscana

1st Stages 1, 2b & 4

1st Central Valley Classic 2008
1st Visalia 2008
2009
1st Road race, National Road Championships
1st Merced Criterium, California
1st Merced Road Race, California
1st Overall San Dimas Stage Race

1st Stages 2 & 3

1st Overall Redlands Classic

1st Stages 1 & 2

1st Ronde Van Vlaanderen World Cup
1st Drenthe 8 Van Dwingeloo
1st Ronde van Gelderland
1st Stage 4 Gracia–Orlová
Tour de l'Aude

1st Stages 1, 3 & 9

1st Commerce Bank Liberty Classic Philadelphia
1st Overall RaboSter Zeeuwsche Eilanden
1st Stage 4 Giro d'Italia Femminile
La Route de France

1st Stages 1 & 3

1st Stage 5 Holland Ladies Tour
1st Stage 5 Giro della Toscana
2010
1st Overall San Dimas Stage Race

1st Stage 3

1st Overall Redlands Classic

1st Stage 1

1st Drenthe 8 Van Dwingeloo
1st Overall Tour of Chongming Island

1st Stages 1 & 3

1st Tour of Chongming Island World Cup
Tour de l'Aude

1st Points classification
1st Stages 3, 6 & 9

1st Commerce Bank Liberty Classic Philadelphia
Giro d'Italia Femminile

1st Stages 1, 2, 3 & 4

1st Stage 1 La Route de France
1st Stage 1 Holland Ladies Tour
1st Stage 1 Giro della Toscana
2011
1st Road race, National Road Championships
1st Stage 3 Tour of New Zealand
1st Stage 2 Energiewacht Tour
1st Ronde van Gelderland
1st Overall Tour of Chongming Island

1st Points classification
1st Stage 2

1st Tour of Chongming Island World Cup
1st Stage 1 Giro del Trentino
Giro d'Italia Femminile

1st Stages 4 & 10

Thüringen Rundfahrt der Frauen

1st Stages 1 & 2

Trophée d'Or Féminin

1st Stages 1 & 2 (TTT)

Giro della Toscana

1st Stages 1 (TTT), 2 & 4a

2012
1st Team time trial (with Ellen van Dijk, Charlotte Becker, Amber Neben, Evelyn Stevens and Trixi Worrack)
1st Overall Energiewacht Tour

1st Points classification
1st Stages 2, 3 & 4b (TTT)

1st Commerce Bank Liberty Classic Philadelphia
1st Stage 1 Emakumeen Euskal Bira
Thüringen Rundfahrt der Frauen

1st Stages 1 & 2

1st Open de Suède Vårgårda TTT
Holland Ladies Tour

1st Stages 1, 2 & 5

4th Road race, Olympic Games
6th UCI Road World Championships – Women's time trial
