= Emakumeen Euskal Bira =

Spanish multi-day road cycling race

Emakumeen Bira

Race details
- Date: May or June
- Region: Basque Country, Spain
- Discipline: Road race
- Type: Stage race
- Organiser: Iurreta Txirrindulari Elkartea
- Web site: www.birawwt.eus

History
- First edition: 1988
- Editions: 32
- Final edition: 2019
- First winner: Imma De Carlos (ESP)
- Most wins: Hanka Kupfernagel (GER); Joane Somarriba (ESP); (3 wins)
- Final winner: Elisa Longo Borghini (ITA)

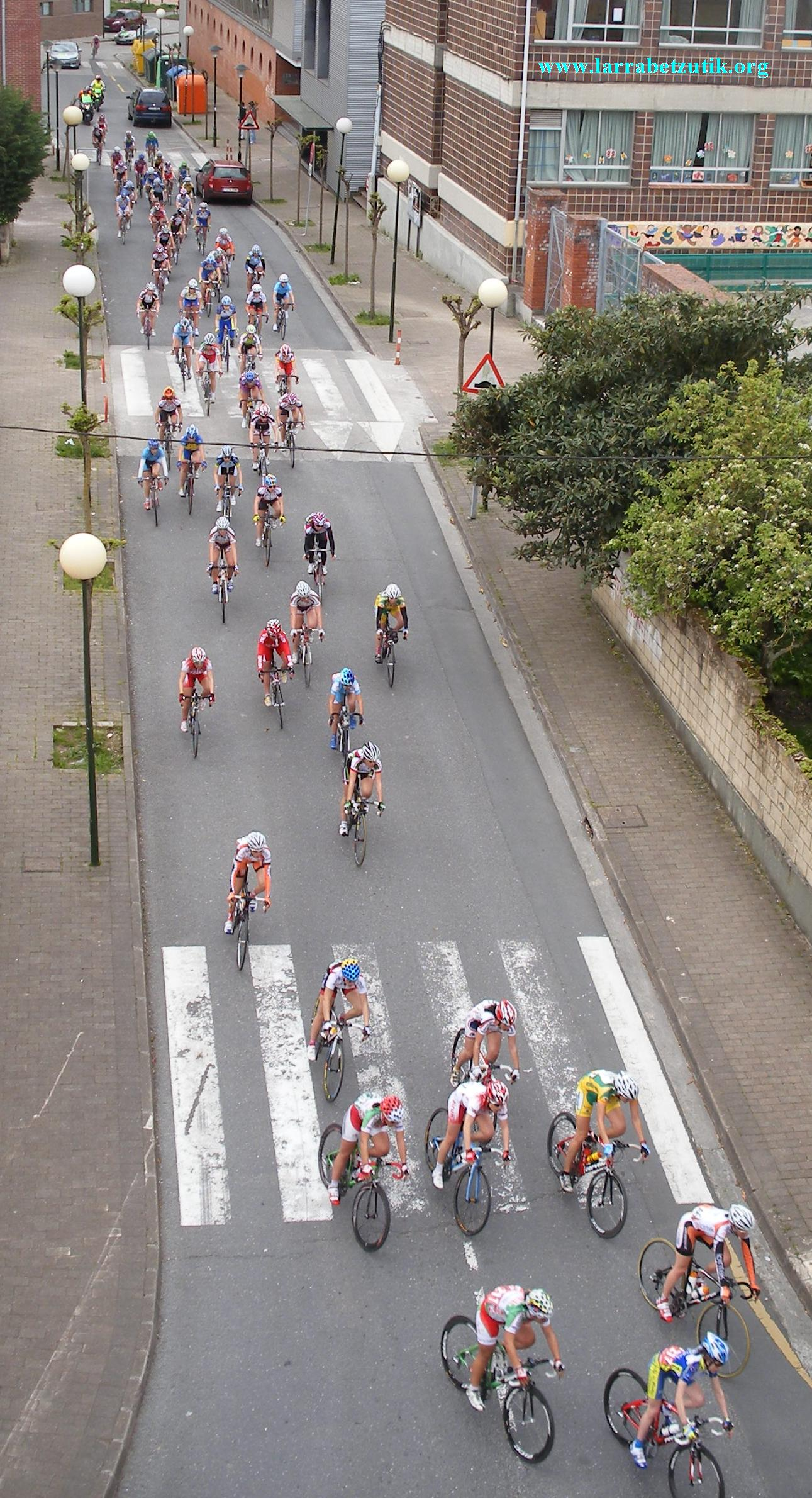
The race in 2010

The Emakumeen Euskal Bira was a women's cycling race held in the Basque Country, Spain. It was held annually from 1988 to 2019, starting out as a two-stage race and building up to five stages in 2007. One of these stages was always a double stage. It was rated a 2.1 category race from 2005 to 2017 and a 2.WWT event in 2018 and 2019.

The name of the race changed during the years, from 1988 to 2007 it was called Emakumeen Bira and from 2008 to 2011 Iurreta-Emakumeen Bira. The race ended after its 2019 edition.

In 2022 a new stage race in Basque Country called Itzulia Women was organised.

== Winners ==
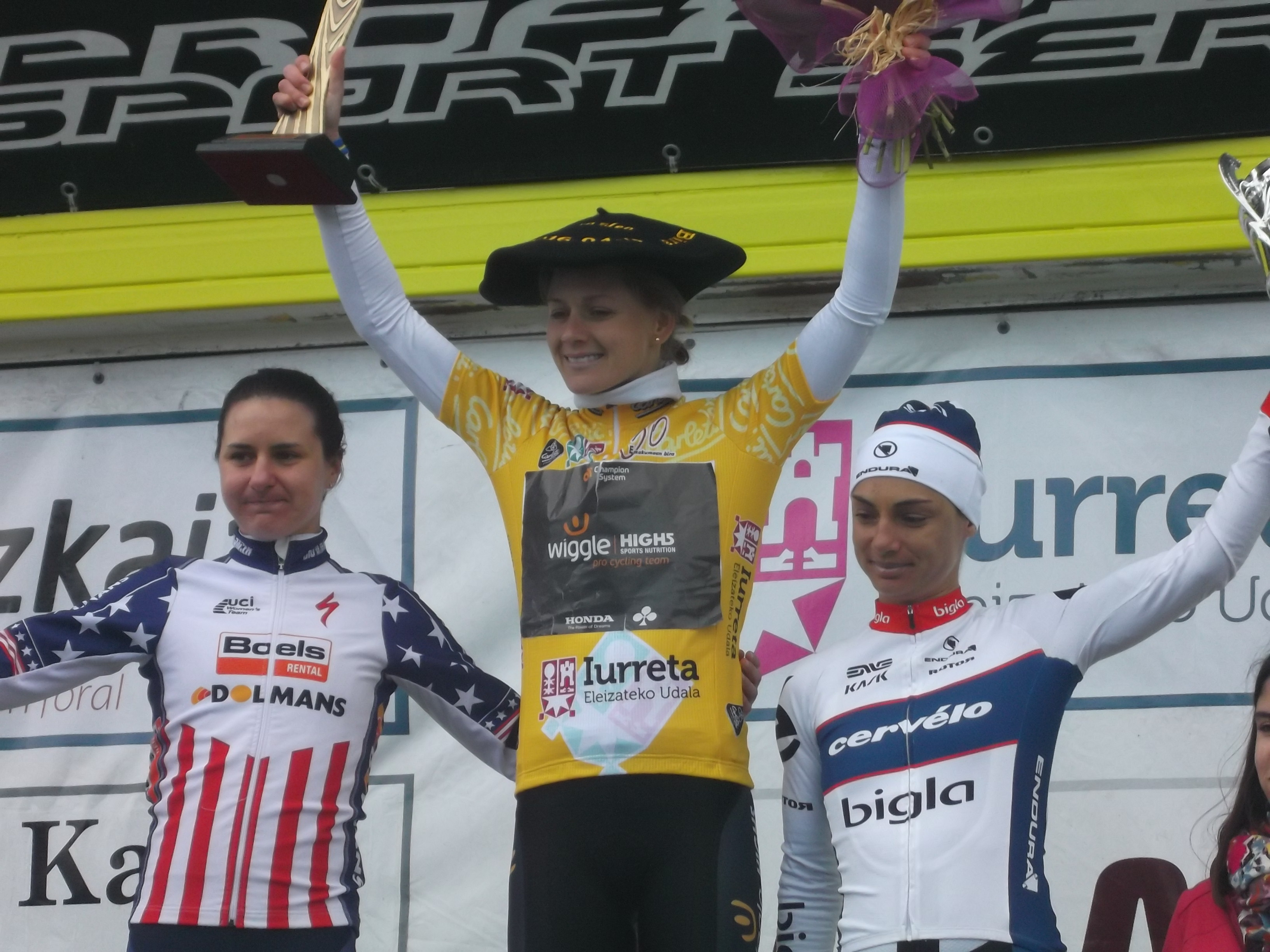
The podium in 2016

Year	First	Second	Third
1988	Imma De Carlos (ESP)		
1989	Maria Mora (ESP)		
1990	Josune Gorostidi (ESP)		
1991	Joane Somarriba (ESP)		
1992	Lenka Ilavská (TCH)	Elena Barillová (CZE)	Teodora Ruano (ESP)
1993	Elena Barillová (CZE)	Lenka Ilavská (SVK)	Ildiko Paczová (CZE)
1994	Elena Barillová (CZE)	Élisabeth Chevanne Brunel (FRA)	Maria Tsal (RUS)
1995	Jeannie Longo-Ciprelli (FRA)	Lenka Ilavská (SVK)	Tatjana Kaveriná (CZE)
1996	Teodora Ruano (ESP)	Lenka Ilavská (SVK)	Joane Somarriba (ESP)
1997	Hanka Kupfernagel (GER)	Alessandra Cappellotto (ITA)	Diana Rast (SUI)
1998	Hanka Kupfernagel (GER)	Lenka Ilavská (SVK)	Ita Kryjanovskaya (RUS)
1999	Hanka Kupfernagel (GER)	Joane Somarriba (ESP)	Valentina Gerasimova (RUS)
2000	Leontien van Moorsel (NED)	Tatyana Stiaykyna (UKR)	Zinaida Stahurskaya (BLR)
2001	Joane Somarriba (ESP)	Daniela Veronesi (SMR)	Fany Lecourtois (FRA)
2002	Edita Pučinskaitė (LTU)	Eneritz Iturriaga (ESP)	Zinaida Stahurskaya (BLR)
2003	Mirjam Melchers (NED)	Olga Sliossareva (RUS)	Jolanta Polikevičiūtė (LTU)
2004	Joane Somarriba (ESP)	Mirjam Melchers (NED)	Fabiana Luperini (ITA)
2005	Svetlana Bubnenkova (RUS)	Trixi Worrack (GER)	Mirjam Melchers (NED)
2006	Fabiana Luperini (ITA)	Susanne Ljungskog (SWE)	Nicole Brändli (SUI)
2007	Susanne Ljungskog (SWE)	Marianne Vos (NED)	Nicole Brändli (SUI)
2008	Marianne Vos (NED)	Tatiana Guderzo (ITA)	Louise Keller (GER)
2009	Judith Arndt (GER)	Claudia Häusler (GER)	Mara Abbott (USA)
2010	Claudia Häusler (GER)	Annemiek van Vleuten (NED)	Judith Arndt (GER)
2011	Marianne Vos (NED)	Emma Johansson (SWE)	Judith Arndt (GER)
2012	Judith Arndt (GER)	Emma Johansson (SWE)	Annemiek van Vleuten (NED)
2013	Emma Johansson (SWE)	Elisa Longo Borghini (ITA)	Evelyn Stevens (USA)
2014	Pauline Ferrand-Prévot (FRA)	Marianne Vos (NED)	Anna van der Breggen (NED)
2015	Katarzyna Niewiadoma (POL)	Ashleigh Moolman (RSA)	Emma Johansson (SWE)
2016	Emma Johansson (SWE)	Megan Guarnier (USA)	Ashleigh Moolman (RSA)
2017	Ashleigh Moolman (RSA)	Annemiek van Vleuten (NED)	Katrin Garfoot (AUS)
2018	Amanda Spratt (AUS)	Annemiek van Vleuten (NED)	Anna van der Breggen (NED)
2019	Elisa Longo Borghini (ITA)	Amanda Spratt (AUS)	Soraya Paladin (ITA)

=== Multiple winners ===
Wins	Rider	Editions
3	Joane Somarriba (ESP)	1991, 2000, 2004
3	Hanka Kupfernagel (GER)	1997, 1998, 1999
2	Elena Barillová (SVK)	1993, 1994
2	Marianne Vos (NED)	2008, 2011
2	Judith Arndt (GER)	2009, 2012
2	Emma Johansson (SWE)	2013, 2016

=== Wins per country ===
Wins	Country
7	Spain
6	Germany
4	Netherlands
3	Slovakia, Sweden
2	France, Italy
1	Australia, Lithuania, Poland, Russia, South Africa
