= Angela Brodtka =

German cyclist (born 1981)

Personal information
- Full name: Angela Hennig
- Born: 15 January 1981 (age 45) Guben, East Germany

Cycling career
- Sport: Cycling
- Current team: Noris Cycling

Angela Brodtka (married Hennig, born 15 January 1981 in Guben) is a former German professional cyclist. She is part of the 2006 AA-Drink Cycling Team. She competed in the women's individual road race at the 2004 Summer Olympics. Since 2010 she is riding for Noris Cycling.

== Palmarès ==
2000
1st Stage 1, Eko Tour
1st Stage 5, Eko Tour

2001
2nd European Road Race Championship, Juniors

2003
1st Stage 4, Holland Ladies Tour

2004
1st GP Castilla y León
1st 10th stage Tour de l'Aude Cycliste Féminin
1st Stage 1, Ster Zeeuwsche Eilanden
3rd German National Road Race Championships
1st Stage 9, Giro d'Italia Femminile
2nd Lowland International Rotterdam Tour
2nd Rund um die Nürnberger Altstadt
3rd World Cup Road Racing
1st Stage 1b, Giro della Toscana International Femminile

2005
3rd German National Road Race Championships
1st Stage 3, Thüringen-Rundfahrt der Frauen
1st Sparkassen Giro

2006
2nd Omloop van Sneek
1st Stage 1, Thüringen-Rundfahrt der Frauen

2008
2nd Omloop Het Volk
