= Irene van den Broek =

Dutch cyclist

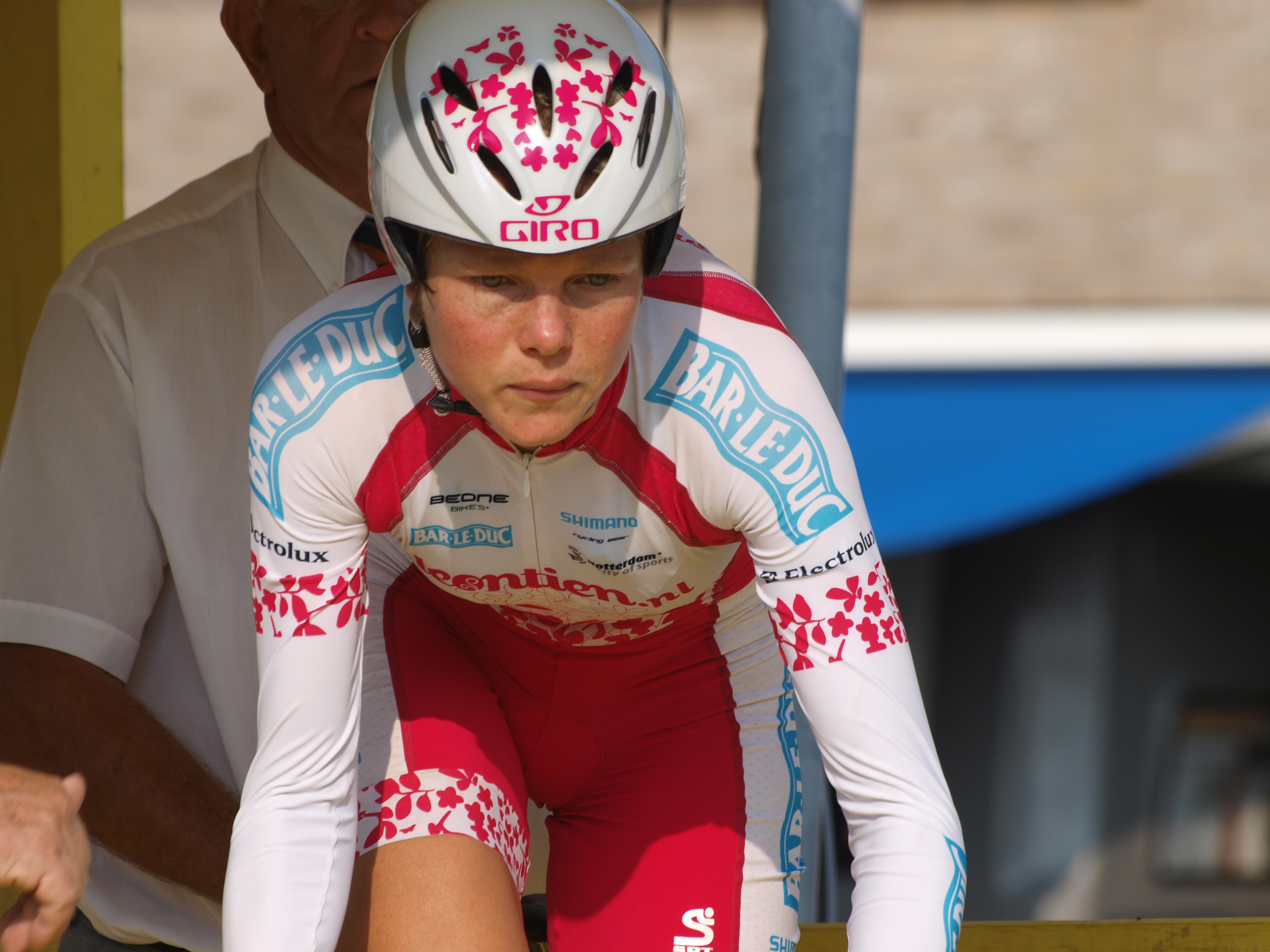

Personal information
- Born: 26 August 1980 (age 46) Nijmegen, Netherlands

Cycling career
- Sport: Cycling
- Discipline: Road cycling

Professional teams
- 2007–2011: AA Cycling Team
- 2012: Dolmans-Boels Cycling Team

Irene van den Broek (born 26 August 1980) is a former road cyclist from the Netherlands. She represented her nation at the 2007 UCI Road World Championships and 2008 UCI Road World Championships.

== See also ==
- 2008 AA-Drink Cycling Team season
- 2011 AA Drink-leontien.nl season
