= Regina Bruins =

Dutch racing cyclist

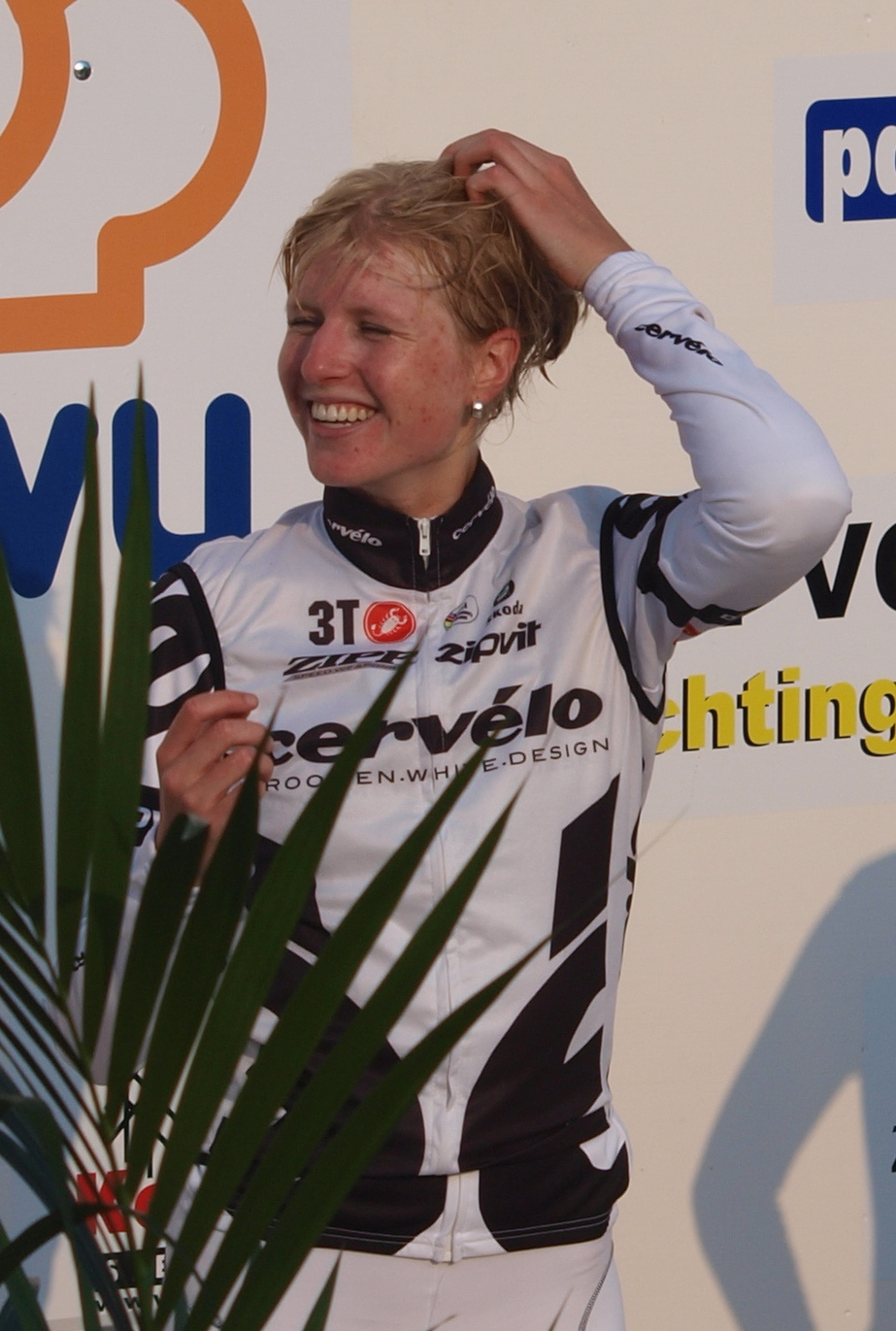
- Bruins after winning the 2009 Dutch Time Trial Championships.

Personal information
- Born: 7 October 1986 (age 40) Leiderdorp, Netherlands

Cycling career
- Sport: Cycling
- Discipline: Road
- Role: Rider

Professional teams
- 2007–2008: Odysis
- 2009–2010: Cervélo TestTeam
- 2011–2012: Skil Koga

Regina Bruins (born 7 October 1986, in Leiderdorp) is a Dutch professional racing cyclist. She announced a hiatus from cycling following diagnosis with pulmonary embolism in 2012, but late in 2013 announced she would return with the second-category Swaboladies.nl team in 2014.

== Major results ==
2007
Dolmans Heuvelland Classic, Sibbe (NED)
2nd Time trial, National Road Championships
2008
3rd Road race, National Road Championships
2009
1st Time trial, National Road Championships
Stage 3, Tour du Grand Montréal
Open de Suede Vargarda TTT
2010
Open de Suede Vargarda TTT
2nd Time trial, National Road Championships
4th Omloop Het Nieuwsblad
