= Tour du Grand Montréal =

Race details
- Date: May/June
- Region: Montreal, Canada
- English name: Tour of Great Montreal
- Discipline: Road
- Type: Stage race
- Web site: www.world-cup-cycling.org/world-cup/index-mgt.htm

History
- First edition: 2002
- Editions: 8
- Final edition: 2009
- First winner: Laura Van Gilder (USA)
- Most wins: Judith Arndt (GER); Oenone Wood (AUS) (2)
- Final winner: Kirsten Wild (NED)

The Tour du Grand Montréal was an annual women's road bicycle racing stage-race in Canada, between 2002 and 2009. It was rated by the UCI as a 2.1 category race.

== Winners ==
Year	Country	Rider	Team
2002	United States	Laura Van Gilder	
2003	United States	Amber Neben	
2004	Germany	Judith Arndt	
2005	Australia	Oenone Wood	
2006	United States	Christine Thorburn	
2007	Australia	Oenone Wood	
2008	Germany	Judith Arndt	
2009	Netherlands	Kirsten Wild	
