= Equipe Nürnberger Versicherung =

Team information
- Registered: Germany
- Founded: 2004
- Disbanded: 2010
- Discipline: Road
- Status: UCI Women's Team

Team name history
- 2000–2001 2002–2009 2010: Equipe Nürnberger; Equipe Nürnberger Versicherung; Team Cycling Noris

Equipe Nürnberger Versicherung was the name of a Nuremberg women's professional cycling team with UCI Women's Team status up to and including the 2009 season. The name was given by the main sponsor Nürnberger Versicherung. Due to its dominating position, also internationally, the team formed the skeleton of the German national team in women's road cycling.

The best-known rider was former road world champion Regina Schleicher, who ended her career in 2009. In addition, German runner-up Trixi Worrack and Edita Pučinskaitė (Lithuania) were among the team's figureheads.

The team's manager was Herbert Oppelt. The team's sporting management was taken over by ex-national coach Jochen Dornbusch (JoDo for short) from Jens Zemke. Dornbusch left the team at the end of June 2010. He was succeeded by Dutchman Thijs Rondhuis.

In August 2009, a new main sponsor for the team was found in the yacht company "Skyter". In early December 2009, the company surprisingly announced its withdrawal. In the 2010 season, the team therefore competed under the name Team Cycling Noris. The name was derived from the Latin name for Nuremberg, Noricum. The team disbanded at the end of the 2010 season.

== 2010 roster ==
Ages as of 1 January 2010.

Rider	Date of birth
Angela Hennig (GER)	January 15, 1981 (aged 28)
Jennifer Hohl (SUI)	March 3, 1986 (aged 23)
Marlen Jöhrend (GER)	January 2, 1986 (aged 23)
Romy Kasper (GER)	May 5, 1988 (aged 21)
Bianca Purath (GER)	January 4, 1985 (aged 24)

Rider	Date of birth
Madeleine Sandig (GER)	August 12, 1983 (aged 26)
Elke Gebhardt (GER)	July 22, 1983 (aged 26)
Trixi Worrack (GER)	September 28, 1981 (aged 28)
Stephanie Pohl (GER)	October 21, 1987 (aged 22)

== Major wins ==
2004
Liberty Classic, Petra Rossner
2005
Overall Geelong Tour, Oenone Wood

Stages 2 & 4, Oenone Wood

Stage 4 Tour of New Zealand, Judith Arndt
Primavera Rosa, Trixi Worrack
GP Liberazione – WE, Regina Schleicher
Overall Gracia–Orlová, Judith Arndt

Stages 1 & 4, Judith Arndt

Vuelta a Castilla y León – WE, Judith Arndt
Stages 1, 3a & 6 Tour de l'Aude Cycliste Féminin, Oenone Wood
Stage 9 Tour de l'Aude Cycliste Féminin, Trixi Worrack
Overall Tour du Grand Montréal, Oenone Wood

Stages 1b & 2, Oenone Wood

Stages 3b & 4 Iurreta-Emakumeen Bira, Trixi Worrack
Stage 2 Giro d'Italia Femminile, Regina Schleicher
Tour de Feminin – Krasna Lipa, Tina Liebig
GP of Wales, Judith Arndt
Stages 1, 2 & 3 Holland Ladies Tour, Regina Schleicher
2006
Trofeo Alfredo Binda, Regina Schleicher
Grand Prix de Dottignies, Oenone Wood
Geelong Tour, Oenone Wood
Stage 7a Tour de l'Aude Cycliste Féminin, Oenone Wood
Stage 3 Tour du Grand Montréal, Katherine Bates
Liberty Classic, Regina Schleicher
Stages 2 & 9 Giro d'Italia Femminile, Regina Schleicher
Stage 8 Giro d'Italia Femminile, Oenone Wood
GP Carnevale d'Europa, Regina Schleicher
Sparkassen Giro Bochum, Oenone Wood
Stages 1 & 4a Boels Ladies Tour, Regina Schleicher
Stage 4 Euregio Ladies Tour, Katherine Bates
Rund um die Nürnberger Altstadt – WE, Regina Schleicher
2007
Drentse 8 van Dwingeloo, Regina Schleicher
Berner-Rundfahrt – WE, Edita Pučinskaitė
Stage 8b Tour de l'Aude Cycliste Féminin, Trixi Worrack
Stages 1 & 2 Tour du Grand Montréal, Regina Schleicher
Durango-Durango Emakumeen Saria, Edita Pučinskaitė
Overall Giro del Trentino Alto Adige-Südtirol, Edita Pučinskaitė

Stages 1 & 2, Edita Pučinskaitė

Overall Giro d'Italia Femminile, Edita Pučinskaitė

Prologie & Stage 3, Edita Pučinskaitė

Stage 4 Tour de Feminin – Krasna Lipa, Andrea Graus
Stage 2 International Thüringen Rundfahrt der Frauen, Regina Schleicher
Albstadt-Frauen-Etappenrennen, Trixi Worrack
Stage 6 Boels Ladies Tour, Regina Schleicher
Giro della Toscana Femminile, Regina Schleicher
2008
Stage 1 Tour of New Zealand, Suzanne de Goede
GP Liberazione – WE, Regina Schleicher
Stage 1 Tour du Grand Montréal, Regina Schleicher
Stage 4 Tour du Grand Montréal, Suzanne de Goede
Stage 3b Iurreta-Emakumeen Bira, Regina Schleicher
Stage 1 Giro del Trentino Alto Adige, Regina Schleicher
Stage 6 Giro d'Italia Femminile, Claudia Häusler
International Thüringen Rundfahrt der Frauen, Trixi Worrack
Sparkassen Giro Bochum, Suzanne de Goede
Draai van de Kaai, Christina Becker
Holland Hills Classic, Larissa Kleinmann
Overall Albstadt-Frauen-Etappenrennen, Trixi Worrack

Prologue, Stages 1 & 2, Trixi Worrack

Boels Ladies Tour, Charlotte Becker
2009
Stage 2 Ladies Tour of Qatar, Eva Lutz
Omloop Het Nieuwsblad, Suzanne de Goede
Stages 2 & 4 Tour of Chongming Island, Marlen Johrend
Overall Gracia–Orlová, Trixi Worrack

Stage 3, Amber Neben

Stage 6 Tour de l'Aude Cycliste Féminin, Trixi Worrack
Stage 1 Giro del Trentino Alto Adige, Regina Schleicher
Stage 2 Rabobank Ster Zeeuwsche Eilanden, Suzanne de Goede
Stage 2 Giro d'Italia Femminile, Amber Neben
Stage 8 Giro d'Italia Femminile, Trixi Worrack
Stage 2 International Thüringen Rundfahrt der Frauen, Charlotte Becker
Overall Albstadt-Frauen-Etappenrennen, Charlotte Becker

Stage 1, Charlotte Becker
Stage 2, Lisa Brennauer

2010
Halle-Buizingen, Jennifer Hohl
Overall Tour de Feminin – Krasna Lipa, Trixi Worrack

Stages 1, 2, 3a, 3b & 4, Trixi Worrack

== National champions ==
2005
Australian Time Trial Championship, Oenone Wood
German Road Championship, Regina Schleicher
German Time Trial Championship, Judith Arndt
World Road Championship, Regina Schleicher
2006
Australian Road Championship, Katherine Bates
German Road Championship, Claudia Häusler
2007
Lithuanian Time Trial Championship, Edita Pučinskaitė
2008
Lithuanian Road Championship, Modesta Vžesniauskaitė
2009
German Time Trial Championship, Trixi Worrack
