= List of 2005 UCI Women's Teams and riders =

Listed below are the UCI Women's Teams and riders that competed in 2005 women's road cycling events organized by the International Cycling Union (UCI) including the 2005 UCI Women's Road World Cup.

== Teams overview ==
UCI code	Team Name	Country
AAG	Arbö Askö Graz	Austria
RCE	Elk Haus-tirol Noe	Austria
VLL	Vlaanderen–Capri Sonne–T Interim	Belgium
TSA	Team S.A.T.S	Denmark
BIZ	Bizkaia–Panda Software–Durango	Spain
TPA	Team Pruneaux d'Agen	France
NUR	Equipe Nürnberger Versicherung	Germany
FRW	A.S. Team F.R.W	Italy
NMC	Nobili Rubinetterie–Menikini Cogeas	Italy
FEN	P.M.B. Fenixs	Italy
MIC	S.C. Michela Fanini Record Rox	Italy
SAF	Safi–Pasta Zara–Manhattan	Italy
LCT	SS Lazio Ciclismo Team Ladispoli	Italy
TOG	Top Girls Fassa Bortolo Hausbrandt Caffe	Italy
ALI	Team Bianchi–Aliverti	Lithuania
HCT	@Work Cycling Team	Netherlands
BFL	Buitenpoort - Flexpoint Team	Netherlands
TSC	Therme Skin Care	Netherlands
BAA	Van Bemmelen–AA Drink	Netherlands
VWL	Vitron Wilstra Lorini	Netherlands
VVP	Vrienden van het Platteland	Netherlands
TBG	Team Bigla	Switzerland
NEX	Team Next 125	Switzerland
UPT	Univega Pro Cycling Team	Switzerland
TMP	Team T-Mobile Women	United States

== Cyclists ==
=== @Work Cycling Team ===
Ages as of 1 January 2005.

Rider	Date of birth
Saskia Elemans (NED)	March 11, 1977 (aged 27)
Areke Hassink (NED)	September 23, 1981 (aged 23)
Loes Markerink (NED)	December 14, 1985 (aged 19)
Bertine Spijkerman (NED)	May 31, 1982 (aged 22)
Marjon Spijkerman (NED)	April 17, 1985 (aged 19)
Kirsten Wild (NED)	October 15, 1982 (aged 22)

Rider	Date of birth
Fonny Wekema (NED)	September 18, 1977 (aged 27)
Brigit Mulder (NED)	November 20, 1980 (aged 24)
Judith Helmink (NED)	April 21, 1983 (aged 21)
Jaccolien Wallaard (NED)	September 30, 1982 (aged 22)
Ghita Beltman (NED)	April 5, 1978 (aged 26)

=== Nobili Rubinetterie-menikini Cogeas ===
Ages as of 1 January 2005.

Rider	Date of birth
Anna Gusmini (ITA)	February 1, 1982 (aged 22)
Silvia Valsecchi (ITA)	July 19, 1982 (aged 22)
Sigrid Corneo (ITA)	April 27, 1971 (aged 33)
Daniela Fusar Poli (ITA)	October 17, 1984 (aged 20)
Olga Slyusareva (RUS)	April 28, 1969 (aged 35)
Modesta Vžesniauskaitė (LTU)	October 17, 1983 (aged 21)
Edita Pučinskaitė (LTU)	November 27, 1975 (aged 29)
Joanne Kiesanowski (NZL)	May 24, 1979 (aged 25)

Rider	Date of birth
Ombretta Ugolini (ITA)	July 8, 1979 (aged 25)
Milena Pirola (ITA)	August 20, 1984 (aged 20)
Francesca Andina (ITA)	February 20, 1986 (aged 18)
Oxana Kostenko (RUS)	July 9, 1982 (aged 22)
Evelyn García (ESA)	December 29, 1982 (aged 22)
Miho Oki (JPN)	March 8, 1974 (aged 30)
Emanuela Azzini (ITA)	October 6, 1981 (aged 23)

=== P.M.B. Fenixs ===
Ages as of 1 January 2005.

Rider	Date of birth
Svetlana Stolbova (RUS)	January 2, 1973 (aged 31)2005
Yuliya Martisova (RUS)	June 15, 1976 (aged 28)
Marta Evangelisti (ITA)	March 9, 1981 (aged 23)
Vanessa Saccomani (ITA)	November 19, 1975 (aged 29)
Sonia Rocca (ITA)	April 5, 1976 (aged 28)
Annamaria Bresci (ITA)	November 15, 1965 (aged 39)

Rider	Date of birth
Giovanna Silvestro (ITA)	November 17, 1985 (aged 19)
Caterina Bernardoni (ITA)	November 8, 1985 (aged 19)
Alexandra Nohles (GER)	March 10, 1968 (aged 36)
Elena Eifler (GER)	November 18, 1981 (aged 23)
Aline Parsy (FRA)	November 5, 1981 (aged 23)

=== SS Lazio Ciclismo Team Ladispoli ===
Ages as of 1 January 2005.

Rider	Date of birth
Noelia Fernandez (ARG)	March 15, 1978 (aged 26)
Silvia Parietti (ITA)	March 19, 1978 (aged 26)
Emanuela Citracca (ITA)	August 5, 1974 (aged 30)
Marta Vila Josana Andreu (ESP)	March 13, 1975 (aged 29)
Costanza Martinelli (ITA)	December 12, 1970 (aged 34)

Rider	Date of birth
Barbara Lancioni (ITA)	September 17, 1981 (aged 23)
Ivana Kunze (ARG)	May 16, 1982 (aged 22)
Sonia Marini (ITA)	January 27, 1986 (aged 18)
Lina Fiorini (ITA)	October 1, 1973 (aged 31)

=== Team Next 125 ===
Ages as of 1 January 2005.

Rider	Date of birth
Monika Furrer (SUI)	August 6, 1985 (aged 19)
Andrea Knecht (SUI)	October 20, 1983 (aged 21)
Annette Griner (GER)	April 5, 1976 (aged 28)
Katrin Leumann (SUI)	February 8, 1982 (aged 22)
Alexandrine Petitpierre (SUI)	May 17, 1973 (aged 31)

Rider	Date of birth
Marion Brauen (SUI)	May 3, 1977 (aged 27)
Mirjam Hauser-Senn (SUI)	September 9, 1980 (aged 24)
Carmen Schnyder (SUI)	April 6, 1972 (aged 32)
Simone Trafelet (SUI)	June 23, 1981 (aged 23)

=== Team S.A.T.S ===
Ages as of 1 January 2005.

Rider	Date of birth
Meredith Miller (USA)	December 26, 1973 (aged 31)
Dorte Lohse Rasmussen (DEN)	March 16, 1971 (aged 33)
Karina Louise Sorensen (DEN)	December 15, 1982 (aged 22)
Mette Fischer Andreasen (DEN)	April 13, 1983 (aged 21)
Melissa Holt (NZL)	December 11, 1976 (aged 28)

Rider	Date of birth
Rachel Heal (GBR)	April 1, 1973 (aged 31)
Sandrine Marcuz (FRA)	July 31, 1978 (aged 26)
Mette Andersen (DEN)	January 9, 1974 (aged 30)
Trine Hansen (DEN)	May 11, 1975 (aged 29)

=== Team T-Mobile Women ===
Ages as of 1 January 2005.

Rider	Date of birth
Kristin Armstrong (USA)	August 11, 1973 (aged 31)
Kimberly Bruckner Baldwin (USA)	June 19, 1970 (aged 34)
Mari Holden Paulsen (USA)	March 30, 1971 (aged 33)
Lara Kroepsh (USA)	November 27, 1978 (aged 26)

Rider	Date of birth
Rebecca Much (USA)	February 25, 1986 (aged 18)
Brooke Ourada (USA)	June 2, 1977 (aged 27)
Kori Seehafer (USA)	April 30, 1975 (aged 29)
Ina-Yoko Teutenberg (GER)	October 28, 1974 (aged 30)

=== Therme Skin Care ===
Ages as of 1 January 2005.

Rider	Date of birth
Francis Linthorst (NED)	November 14, 1974 (aged 30)
Arenda Grimberg (NED)	March 10, 1978 (aged 26)
Janneke Vos (NED)	March 20, 1977 (aged 27)
Moniek Rotmensen (NED)	April 25, 1986 (aged 18)
Renate Groenewold (NED)	October 8, 1976 (aged 28)
Angela Hillenga (NED)	November 24, 1972 (aged 32)
Christina Mos (NED)	July 14, 1972 (aged 32)

Rider	Date of birth
Sarah Düster (GER)	July 10, 1982 (aged 22)
Ludivine Henrion (BEL)	January 23, 1984 (aged 20)
Corine Hierckens (BEL)	May 30, 1982 (aged 22)
Yvonne Hijgenaar (NED)	May 15, 1980 (aged 24)
Irene van den Broek (NED)	August 26, 1980 (aged 24)
Liesbeth Bakker (NED)	July 6, 1986 (aged 18)
Agne Bagdonaviciute (LTU)	June 4, 1985 (aged 19)

=== Univega Pro Cycling Team ===
Ages as of 1 January 2005.

Rider	Date of birth
Priska Doppmann (SUI)	May 10, 1971 (aged 33)
Sarah Grab (SUI)	July 13, 1979 (aged 25)
Sereina Trachsel (SUI)	February 9, 1981 (aged 23)
Karin Thürig (SUI)	July 4, 1972 (aged 32)

Rider	Date of birth
Diana Rast (SUI)	August 28, 1970 (aged 34)
Christiane Soeder (AUT)	January 15, 1975 (aged 29)
Emma Rickards (AUS)	November 17, 1973 (aged 31)
Franziska Roethlin (SUI)	March 15, 1979 (aged 25)

=== Vitron Wilstra Lorini ===
Ages as of 1 January 2005.

Rider	Date of birth
Marjolijn Gödde (NED)	April 19, 1986 (aged 18)
Famke Kweekel (NED)	October 13, 1984 (aged 20)
Marlous Spaargaren (NED)	May 10, 1985 (aged 19)
Juliette Wigbold (NED)	November 9, 1986 (aged 18)
Tone Hatteland Lima (NOR)	December 18, 1979 (aged 25)
Ilona Valkenburg (NED)	February 8, 1984 (aged 20)
Katrijn Scheffer (NED)	May 28, 1979 (aged 25)

Rider	Date of birth
Aletta Huisjes (NED)	October 5, 1982 (aged 22)
Leda Cox (GBR)	January 6, 1975 (aged 29)
Trisha Borst (NED)	June 1, 1982 (aged 22)
Patricia Hermes (NED)	October 19, 1978 (aged 26)
Cindy van Loon (NED)	January 6, 1981 (aged 23)
Jeanette Tebbutt (GBR)	July 8, 1972 (aged 32)
Linda Larsen (NOR)	April 10, 1977 (aged 27)

=== Vrienden van het Platteland ===
Ages as of 1 January 2005.

Rider	Date of birth
Chantal Beltman (NED)	August 25, 1976 (aged 28)
Andrea Bosman (NED)	August 6, 1979 (aged 25)
Minke van Dongen (NED)	January 19, 1983 (aged 21)
Sharon van Essen (NED)	March 3, 1981 (aged 23)
Loes Gunnewijk (NED)	November 27, 1980 (aged 24)

Rider	Date of birth
Corrien van Haastert (NED)	February 11, 1982 (aged 22)
Esther van der Helm (NED)	September 5, 1981 (aged 23)
Aukje de Koning (NED)	January 29, 1980 (aged 24)
Kristy Miggels (NED)	August 6, 1980 (aged 24)
Iris Slappendel (NED)	February 18, 1985 (aged 19)

Preceded by 2004	List of UCI Women's Teams; 2005	Succeeded by 2006
