= 2007 Vrienden van het Platteland season =

2007 Vrienden van het Platteland
- UCI Team ranking: 23rd
- Manager: Jan van Dam

Season victories
- One-day races: Road: 2 Track: 1
- Stage race overall: 0
- Stage race stages: 1
- Best ranked rider: Ellen van Dijk (37th)
- Jersey

The 2007 women's road cycling season was the eighth season for the Vrienden van het Platteland (UCI code: VVP) cycling team, which began as Ondernemers van Nature in 2000.

The main victories on the road for the team were the time trial at the Tour of Chongming Island by Ellen van Dijk and the Norwegian and Dutch Time Trial Championships by Anita Valen and Ellen van Dijk. On the track Van Dijk also won the individual pursuit at the Dutch National Track Cycling Championships. At the end of the year the team ended 23rd in the UCI Team's Ranking with Ellen van Dijk as the best individual at the 37th place in the UCI Individual Women's Road Ranking.

== Roster ==
Ages as of 1 January 2007.

Rider	Date of birth
Liesbeth Bakker (NED)	1 July 1986 (aged 20)
Janne Brok (NED)	7 June 1987 (aged 19)
Katie Brown (AUS)	2 February 1983 (aged 23)
Ellen van Dijk (NED)	11 February 1987 (aged 19)
Yvonne Leezer (NED)	9 February 1987 (aged 19)
Emma Mackie (AUS)	9 September 1984 (aged 22)

Rider	Date of birth
Anita Valen (NOR)	12 December 1968 (aged 38)
Monique van de Ree (NED)	2 March 1988 (aged 18)
Moniek Rotmensen (NED)	25 April 1986 (aged 20)
Monique Verstraten (NED)	24 April 1983 (aged 23)
Jaccolien Wallaard (NED)	30 September 1982 (aged 24)

Riders who joined the team for the 2007 season

Rider	2006 team
Liesbeth Bakker (NED)	
Katie Brown (AUS)	
Emma Mackie (AUS)	
Anita Valen (NOR)	
Monique van de Ree (NED)	
Jaccolien Wallaard (NED)	

Riders who left the team during or after the 2006 season

Rider	2007 team
Chantal Beltman (NED)	
Heidi de Voogd (NED)	
Corrien van Haastert (NED)	
Esther van der Helm (NED)	
Iris Slappendel (NED)	
Sharon van Essen (NED)	

== Season ==
The first podium place for the team was a third place for Jaccolien Wallaard at Omloop Het Volk in March. In May Ellen van Dijk finished third at Omloop van Borsele and in the time trial stage at the Tour de l'Aude Cycliste Féminin. Van Dijk finished third again in an international time trial at the Tour of Chongming Island Time trial in June. The day afterwards Van Dijk won the first stage of the Tour of Chongming Island with Wallaard in third place. After finishing second in the stage 2 and stage 3 Van Dijk ended also second in the general classification. In July Ellen van Dijk represented the Netherlands at the European Championships (under-23) and finished fifth in the time trial. At the national championships Anita Valen won the time trial in Norway and finished second in the road race. In the Netherlands Ellen van Dijk won the Dutch time trial championships. Due to Van Dijks' good results in the time trials she was chosen to represent the Netherlands in the time trial at the World Championships in Stuttgart where she finished 17th. Due to her good results Ellen van Dijk became sportswomen of the year of Woerden. Van Dijk was invited to join the Dutch national track cycling team. At the national track championships she became Dutch champion in the individual pursuit, ahead of Marianne Vos and Kirsten Wild, and finished fourth in the scratch race and points race.

== Results ==
=== Season victories ===
Single day and stage races 2007
Date	Nation	Race	Cat.	Winner
3 June	China	Stage 1 Tour of Chongming Island	2.2	(Netherlands) Ellen van Dijk

National, Continental and World champions 2007
Date	Discipline	Jersey	Winner
29 June	Norwegian National Time Trial Champion		Anita Valen
15 August	Dutch national time trial champion		Ellen van Dijk
30 December	Dutch National Track Cycling Champion – Individual pursuit		Ellen van Dijk

== Results in major races ==
Results at the 2007 UCI Women's Road World Cup races
#	Date	Race	Country	Best rider	Place
1	3 March	Geelong World Cup	Australia	-	-
2	8 April	Tour of Flanders for Women	Belgium	(Netherlands) Ellen van Dijk (Note: As part of the Dutch national team)	40th
3	12 April	Ronde van Drenthe	Netherlands	(Netherlands) Ellen van Dijk	15th
4	25 April	La Flèche Wallonne Féminine	Belgium	-	-
5	13 May	Tour de Berne	Switzerland	-	-
6	2 June	Coupe du Monde Cycliste Féminine de Montréal	Canada	-	-
7	5 August	Open de Suède Vårgårda	Sweden	(Norway) Anita Valen	13th
8	1 September	GP de Plouay	France	-	-
9	16 September	Rund um die Nürnberger Altstadt	Germany	(Norway) Anita Valen	15th

Results in other major single day races
Date	Race (Note: Riders are in these championships part of the national team)	Rider	Place
3 July	European Road Championships – Women's under-23 time trial	(Netherlands) Ellen van Dijk	5th
5 July	European Road Championships – Women's under-23 road race	(Netherlands) Ellen van Dijk	11th
23 September	Road World Championships – Women's time trial	(Netherlands) Ellen van Dijk	17th

== UCI World Ranking ==
The team finished 23rd in the UCI ranking for teams.

Individual UCI World Ranking
Rank	Rider	Points
37	(Netherlands) Ellen van Dijk	145
120	(Norway) Anita Valen	34
145	(Netherlands) Jaccolien Wallaard	22
356	(Netherlands) Monique van de Ree	3
