= 2006 Holland Ladies Tour =

Race details
- Dates: August 28 – September 2
- Stages: 7
- Distance: 703 km (437 mi)
- Winning time: 18h 03' 40"

Results
Jersey awarded to the overall winner	Winner	Susanne Ljungskog (SWE)	(Buitenpoort - Flexpoint Team)
	Second	Trixi Worrack (GER)	(Equipe Nürnberger Versicherung)
	Third	Judith Arndt (GER)	(Team T-Mobile Women)
Jersey awarded to the points classification winner	Points	Giorgia Bronzini (ITA)	(Italian National Team)
Jersey awarded to the mountains classification winner	Mountains	Susanne Ljungskog (SWE)	(Buitenpoort - Flexpoint Team)
Jersey awarded to the young rider classification winner	Young rider	Linda Villumsen (DEN)	(Buitenpoort - Flexpoint Team)
Jersey awarded to the sprints classification winner	Sprints	Bertine Spijkerman (NED)	(Therme Skin Care)
	Team	Buitenpoort - Flexpoint Team	

The 9th edition of the annual Holland Ladies Tour was held from August 28 to September 2, 2006. The women's stage race with an UCI rating of 2.1 started in Sint-Willebrord, and ended in Heerlen.

== Stages ==
=== 2006-08-28: Sint Willebrord — Sint Willebrord (118.5 km) ===
Place	Stage 1		General Classification	
Place	Name	Time	Name	Time
1.	Regina Schleicher (GER)	03:07.00	Regina Schleicher (GER)	03:06.50
2.	Angela Brodtka (GER)	—	Angela Brodtka (GER)	+0.04
3.	Diana Žiliūtė (LTU)	—	Bertine Spijkerman (NED)	+0.04

=== 2006-08-29: Assen — Assen (122 km) ===
Place	Stage 2		General Classification	
Place	Name	Time	Name	Time
1.	Ina-Yoko Teutenberg (GER)	03:06.13	Regina Schleicher (GER)	06:13.03
2.	Giorgia Bronzini (ITA)	—	Angela Brodtka (GER)	+0.04
3.	Marta Bastianelli (ITA)	—	Giorgia Bronzini (ITA)	+0.04

=== 2006-08-30: Goor — Goor (127.2 km) ===
Place	Stage 3		General Classification	
Place	Name	Time	Name	Time
1.	Ina-Yoko Teutenberg (GER)	03:14.10	Regina Schleicher (GER)	09:27.13
2.	Marianne Vos (NED)	—	Giorgia Bronzini (ITA)	+0.04
3.	Priska Doppmann (SUI)	—	Angela Brodtka (GER)	+0.04

=== 2006-08-31: Roden — Roden (78.3 km) ===
Place	Stage 4-A		General Classification	
Place	Name	Time	Name	Time
1.	Regina Schleicher (GER)	03:14.10	Regina Schleicher (GER)	11:30.04
2.	Giorgia Bronzini (ITA)	—	Giorgia Bronzini (ITA)	+0.06
3.	Ina-Yoko Teutenberg (GER)	—	Angela Brodtka (GER)	+0.10
4.	Bertine Spijkerman (NED)	—		
5.	Marianne Vos (NED)	—		
6.	Tanja Hennes (GER)	—		
7.	Chantal Beltman (NED)	—		
8.	Kirsten Wild (NED)	—		
9.	Alessandra D'Ettorre (ITA)	—		
10.	Ellen van Dijk (NED)	—		

=== 2006-08-31: Roden — Roden (23 km) ===
Place	Stage 4-B (Team Time Trial)		General Classification	
Place	Name	Time	Name	Time
1.	Buitenpoort - Flexpoint Team	00:27.01,74	Susanne Ljungskog (SWE)	11:57.16
2.	Equipe Nürnberger Versicherung	+0.42,69	Linda Villumsen (DEN)	+0.05
3.	AA-Drink Cycling Team	+0.44,67	Loes Gunnewijk (NED)	+0.05

=== 2006-09-01: Oirschot — Oirschot (123.6 km) ===
Place	Stage 5		General Classification	
Place	Name	Time	Name	Time
1.	Vera Carrara (ITA)	03:06.32	Susanne Ljungskog (SWE)	15:04.17
2.	Élodie Touffet (FRA)	—	Loes Gunnewijk (NED)	+0.09
3.	Sarah Düster (GER)	—	Linda Villumsen (DEN)	+0.10

=== 2006-09-02: Heerlen — Heerlen (110.4 km) ===
Place	Stage 6		General Classification	
Place	Name	Time	Name	Time
1.	Judith Arndt (GER)	02:59.32	Susanne Ljungskog (SWE)	18:03.40
2.	Susanne Ljungskog (SWE)	—	Trixi Worrack (GER)	+1.02
3.	Chantal Beltman (NED)	—	Judith Arndt (GER)	+1.39

== Classification leadership ==
Stage	Winner	General classification	Points classification	Sprint classification	Mountain classification	Young rider classification	Combination classification	Team classification
1	Regina Schleicher	Regina Schleicher	Regina Schleicher	Ellen van Dijk	No award	Loes Markerink	Liesbet De Vocht	Nürnberger Versicherung
2	Ina-Yoko Teutenberg	Regina Schleicher	Regina Schleicher	Bertine Spijkerman	Marianne Vos	Marta Bastianelli	Trixi Worrack	
3	Ina-Yoko Teutenberg	Regina Schleicher	Ina-Yoko Teutenberg	Bertine Spijkerman	Marianne Vos	Marta Bastianelli	Judith Helmink	Buitenpoort - Flexpoint Team
4a	Regina Schleicher	Regina Schleicher	Ina-Yoko Teutenberg	Bertine Spijkerman	Marianne Vos	Loes Markerink	Judith Helmink	AA-Drink Cycling Team
4b	Buitenpoort - Flexpoint Team	Susanne Ljungskog	Ina-Yoko Teutenberg	Bertine Spijkerman	Marianne Vos	Linda Villumsen	Judith Helmink	Buitenpoort - Flexpoint Team
5	Vera Carrara	Susanne Ljungskog	Giorgia Bronzini	Bertine Spijkerman	Marianne Vos	Linda Villumsen	Judith Helmink	Buitenpoort - Flexpoint Team
6	Judith Arndt	Susanne Ljungskog	Giorgia Bronzini	Bertine Spijkerman	Susanne Ljungskog	Linda Villumsen	Judith Helmink	Buitenpoort - Flexpoint Team
Final Classification		Susanne Ljungskog	Giorgia Bronzini	Bertine Spijkerman	Susanne Ljungskog	Linda Villumsen	Judith Helmink	Buitenpoort - Flexpoint Team

== Final standings ==
=== General Classification ===
RANK	NAME	TEAM	TIME
1.	Susanne Ljungskog (SWE)	Buitenpoort - Flexpoint Team	18:03.40
2.	Trixi Worrack (GER)	Equipe Nürnberger Versicherung	+ 1.02
3.	Judith Arndt (GER)	Team T-Mobile Women	+ 1.39
4.	Tatiana Guderzo (ITA)	Italian National Team	+ 1.54
5.	Chantal Beltman (NED)	Vrienden van het Platteland	+ 2.31
6.	Loes Gunnewijk (NED)	Buitenpoort - Flexpoint Team	+ 2.39
7.	Kristin Armstrong (USA)	US National Team	+ 3.23
8.	Lise Christensen (DEN)	Bianchi Aliverti Kookai	+ 6.09
9.	Linda Villumsen (DEN)	Buitenpoort - Flexpoint Team	+ 6.27
10.	Madeleine Sandig (GER)	Buitenpoort - Flexpoint Team	+ 6.40

=== Points Classification ===
RANK	NAME	TEAM	POINTS
1.	Giorgia Bronzini (ITA)	Italian National Team	80
2.	Angela Brodtka (GER)	German National Team	43
3.	Marianne Vos (NED)	Team DSB Bank	42

=== Mountains Classification ===
RANK	NAME	TEAM	POINTS
1.	Susanne Ljungskog (SWE)	Buitenpoort - Flexpoint Team	32
2.	Claudia Häusler (GER)	Equipe Nürnberger Versicherung	28
3.	Marianne Vos (NED)	Team DSB Bank	27

=== Best Young Rider Classification ===
RANK	NAME	TEAM	TIME
1.	Linda Villumsen (DEN)	Buitenpoort - Flexpoint Team	18:10.07
2.	Claudia Häusler (GER)	Equipe Nürnberger Versicherung	+ 00.22
3.	Loes Markerink (NED)	@Work Cycling Team	+ 02.03

=== Sprint Classification ===
RANK	NAME	TEAM	POINTS
1.	Bertine Spijkerman (NED)	Therme Skin Care	15
2.	Susanne Ljungskog (SWE)	Buitenpoort - Flexpoint Team	8
3.	Suzanne de Goede (NED)	AA-Drink Cycling Team	4

=== Most Aggressive Rider Classification ===
RANK	NAME	TEAM	POINTS
1.	Judith Helmink (NED)	@Work Cycling Team	8
2.	Trixi Worrack (GER)	Equipe Nürnberger Versicherung	5
3.	Claudia Häusler (GER)	Equipe Nürnberger Versicherung	5
