= 2006 Vrienden van het Platteland season =

My commentry my standard

2006 Vrienden van het Platteland
- UCI Team ranking: 12th
- Manager: Jan van Dam

Season victories
- One-day races: 3
- Stage race overall: 0
- Stage race stages: 1
- Best ranked rider: Chantal Beltman (30th)

The 2006 women's road cycling season was the seventh season for the Vrienden van het Platteland (UCI code: VVP) cycling team, which began as Ondernemers van Nature in 2000.

One of the main new recruits for the team was former junior rider Ellen van Dijk. In March Ellen van Dijk became University World Champion at the 2006 World University Cycling Championship in the women's road race. and finished second in the women's time trial. The other main victories for the team were Flèche Hesbignonne by Chantal Beltman and stage 2 of the Tour Féminin en Limousin by Ellen van Dijk. At the national championships Sharon van Essen finished second in the road race and Iris Slappendel won the bronze medal in the women's time trial. At the end of the year the team ended 12th in the UCI Team's Ranking with Chantal Beltman as the best individual at the 30th place in the UCI Individual Women's Road Ranking. Van Dijk was also active on the track and won the bronze medal at the 2006 Dutch National Track Championships in the women's individual pursuit.

== Roster ==
Ages as of 1 January 2006.

Rider	Date of birth
Chantal Beltman (NED)	25 August 1976 (aged 29)
Janne Brok (NED)	7 June 1987 (aged 18)
Ellen van Dijk (NED)	11 February 1987 (aged 18)
Sharon van Essen (NED)	3 March 1981 (aged 24)
Corrien van Haastert (NED)	11 February 1982 (aged 23)
Esther van der Helm (NED)	5 September 1981 (aged 24)

Rider	Date of birth
Yvonne Leezer (NED)	9 February 1987 (aged 18)
Moniek Rotmensen (NED)	25 April 1986 (aged 19)
Iris Slappendel (NED)	18 February 1985 (aged 20)
Monique Verstraten (NED)	24 April 1983 (aged 22)
Heidi de Voogd (NED)	9 January 1980 (aged 25)

Riders who joined the team for the 2006 season

Rider	2005 team
Janne Brok (NED)	
Ellen van Dijk (NED)	Junior rider
Yvonne Leezer (NED)	Junior rider
Moniek Rotmensen (NED)	
Monique Verstraten (NED)	
Heidi de Voogd (NED)	

Riders who left the team during or after the 2005 season

Rider	2006 team
Andrea Bosman (NED)	
Minke van Dongen (NED)	
Loes Gunnewijk (NED)	
Aukje de Koning (NED)	
Kristy Miggels (NED)	

== Results ==
=== Season victories ===
Single day and stage races 2006
Date	Nation	Race	Cat.	Winner
11 June	France	Flèche Hesbignonne	1.2	(Netherlands) Chantal Beltman
22 July	France	Stage 2 Tour Féminin en Limousin	2.2	(Netherlands) Ellen van Dijk

National, Continental and World champions 2006
Date	Discipline	Jersey	Winner
25 March	World University Champion – Road race		(Netherlands) Ellen van Dijk

== Results in major races ==
Results at the 2006 UCI Women's Road World Cup races
#	Date	Race	Country	Best rider	Place
1	26 February	Geelong World Cup	Australia	-	-
2	5 March	New Zealand World Cup	New Zealand	-	-
3	2 April	Tour of Flanders for Women	Belgium	(Netherlands) Chantal Beltman	27th
4	19 April	La Flèche Wallonne Féminine	Belgium	-	-
5	23 April	Tour de Berne	Switzerland	-	-
6	7 May	GP Castilla y Leon	Spain	-	-
7	27 May	Coupe du Monde Cycliste Féminine de Montréal	Canada	-	-
8	28 July	Open de Suède Vårgårda	Sweden	-	-
9	30 July	Ladies Golden Hour	Denmark	-	-
10	26 August	GP de Plouay	France	-	-
11	3 September	Lowland International Rotterdam Tour	Netherlands	(Netherlands) Ellen van Dijk	6th
12	10 September	Rund um die Nürnberger Altstadt	Germany	-	-

Results in other major single day races
Date	Race (Note: Riders are in these championships part of the national team)	Rider	Place
23 March	World University Championships – Women's time trial	(Netherlands) Ellen van Dijk	2nd place, silver medalist(s)
25 March	World University Championships – Women's road race	(Netherlands) Ellen van Dijk	1st place, gold medalist(s)
15 July	European Road Championships – Women's under-23 road race	(Netherlands) Ellen van Dijk	10th

== UCI World Ranking ==
The team finished 12th in the UCI ranking for teams.

Individual UCI World Ranking
Rank	Rider	Points
30	(Netherlands) Chantal Beltman	223
74	(Netherlands) Ellen van Dijk	58
86	(Netherlands) Iris Slappendel	47
123	(Netherlands) Sharon van Essen	30
376	(Netherlands) Moniek Rotmensen	2
