= 2006 Tour Féminin en Limousin =

Race details
- Dates: 21–23 July 2006
- Stages: 3
- Distance: 244.6 km (152.0 mi)
- Winning time: 6h 48' 38"

Results
	Winner	Marianne Vos (NED)	(Team DSB Bank)
	Second	Svetlana Bubnenkova (RUS)	(Fenixs-Colnago)
	Third	Silvia Valsecchi (ITA)	(Nobili Rubineterie Menikini Cogeas)
	Points	Marianne Vos (NED)	(Team DSB Bank)
	Mountains	Svetlana Bubnenkova (RUS)	(Fenixs-Colnago)
	Youth	Marianne Vos (NED)	(Team DSB Bank)

The 2006 Tour Féminin en Limousin was the second edition of the Tour Féminin en Limousin, a women's cycling stage race in France. It was rated by the UCI as category 2.2 race, and was held between 21 and 23 July 2006.

== Stages ==
=== Stage 1 ===
21 July 2006 – Limoges to Landouge, 4.6 km (2.9 mi), Individual time trial

Stage 1 Result

	Rider	Team	Time
1	Marianne Vos (NED)	Team DSB Bank	6' 15"
2	Svetlana Bubnenkova (RUS)	Fenixs-Colnago	+3"
3	Silvia Valsecchi (ITA)	Nobili Rubineterie Menikini Cogeas	+4"
4	Loes Markerink (NED)	@Work Cycling Team	+4"
5	Ellen van Dijk (NED)	Vrienden van het Platteland	+7"

General Classification after Stage 1

	Rider	Team	Time
1	Marianne Vos (NED)	Team DSB Bank	6' 15"
2	Svetlana Bubnenkova (RUS)	Fenixs-Colnago	+3"
3	Silvia Valsecchi (ITA)	Nobili Rubineterie Menikini Cogeas	+4"
4	Loes Markerink (NED)	@Work Cycling Team	+4"
5	Ellen van Dijk (NED)	Vrienden van het Platteland	+7"

=== Stage 2 ===
22 July 2006 – Auphelle to Auphelle, 117.5 km (73.0 mi)

Stage 2 Result

	Rider	Team	Time
1	Ellen van Dijk (NED)	Vrienden van het Platteland	3h 07' 23"
2	Volha Hayeva (BLR)	Bianchi Aliverti Kookai	s.t.
3	Fanny Riberot (FRA)	Team Pro Feminin Du Genevois	s.t.
4	Loes Markerink (NED)	@Work Cycling Team	s.t.
5	Svetlana Bubnenkova (RUS)	Fenix Colnago	s.t.

General Classification after Stage 2

	Rider	Team	Time
1	Ellen van Dijk (NED)	Vrienden van het Platteland	3h 13' 30"
2	Marianne Vos (NED)	Team DSB Bank	+1"
3	Svetlana Bubnenkova (RUS)	Fenixs-Colnago	+7"
4	Silvia Valsecchi (ITA)	Nobili Rubineterie Menikini Cogeas	+11"
5	Loes Markerink (NED)	@Work Cycling Team	+11"

=== Stage 3 ===
23 July 2006 – Dun Le Palestel to Naillat, 122.5 km (76.1 mi)

Stage 3 Result

	Rider	Team	Time
1	Marianne Vos (NED)	Team DSB Bank	3h 35' 21"
2	Svetlana Bubnenkova (RUS)	Fenix Colnago	s.t.
3	Nikki Butterfield-Egyed (AUS)	Vienne Futuroscope	s.t.
3	Paulina Brzeźna (POL)	Poland national team	s.t.
4	Élisabeth Chevanne Brunel (FRA)	Les Pruneaux d'Agen	s.t.

General Classification after Stage 3

	Rider	Team	Time
1	Marianne Vos (NED)	Team DSB Bank	6h 48' 38"
2	Svetlana Bubnenkova (RUS)	Fenixs-Colnago	+14"
3	Silvia Valsecchi (ITA)	Nobili Rubineterie Menikini Cogeas	+24"
4	Nikki Butterfield-Egyed (AUS)	Vienne Futuroscope	+36"
5	Ellen van Dijk (NED)	Vrienden van het Platteland	+40"

== Final classifications ==
=== General classification ===
	Rider	Team	Time
1	Marianne Vos (NED)	Team DSB Bank	6h 48' 38"
2	Svetlana Bubnenkova (RUS)	Fenixs-Colnago	+14"
3	Silvia Valsecchi (ITA)	Nobili Rubineterie Menikini Cogeas	+24"
4	Nikki Butterfield-Egyed (AUS)	Vienne Futuroscope	+36"
5	Ellen van Dijk (NED)	Vrienden van het Platteland	+40"
6	Paulina Brzeźna (POL)	Poland national team	+43"
7	Élisabeth Chevanne Brunel (FRA)	Les Pruneaux d'Agen	+44"
8	Lise Christensen (DEN)	Bianchi Aliverti Kookai	+46"
9	Loes Markerink (NED)	@Work Cycling Team	+50"
10	Natalia Boyarskaya (RUS)	Fenix Colnago	+53"

=== Points classification ===
	Rider	Team	Points
1	Marianne Vos (NED)	Team DSB Bank	17
2	Ellen van Dijk (NED)	Vrienden van het Platteland	11
3	Lise Christensen (DEN)	Bianchi Aliverti Kookai	8
4	Svetlana Bubnenkova (RUS)	Fenix Colnago	8
5	Volha Hayeva (BLR)	Bianchi Aliverti Kookai	7

=== Mountains classification ===
	Rider	Team	Points
1	Svetlana Bubnenkova (RUS)	Fenix Colnago	54
2	Monika Krawczyk (POL)	Poland national team	20
3	Janne Brok (NED)	Vrienden van het Platteland	17
4	Lise Christensen (DEN)	Bianchi Aliverti Kookai	12
5	Marianne Vos (NED)	Team DSB Bank	

=== Most combative classification ===
	Rider	Team
1	Sylvie Riedle (FRA)	Les Pruneaux d'Agen

=== Youth classification ===
	Rider	Team	Time
1	Marianne Vos (NED)	Team DSB Bank	

== See also ==
- 2006 in women's road cycling
