= 2007 Tour of Chongming Island Stage race =

Race details
- Dates: 3-6 June 2007
- Stages: 4
- Distance: 309.1 km (192.1 mi)
- Winning time: 7h 27' 03"

Results
Jersey awarded to the overall winner	Winner	Meifang Li (China)	(Giant Pro Cycling Team)
	Second	Ellen van Dijk (the Netherlands)	(Vrienden van het Platteland)
	Third	Belinda Goss (Australia)	(Australian National Team)
Jersey awarded to the points classification winner	Points	Belinda Goss (Australia)	(Australian National Team)
	Team	China JiangSu Team	

The 2007 Tour of Chongming Island Stage race was the first women's edition of the Tour of Chongming Island cycling stage race. It was rated by the UCI as category 2.1, and was held between 3 and 6 June 2007, in China.

== Stages ==
=== Stage 1 ===
3 June 2007 – Renshou Yatong City, 65.5 km (40.7 mi), Criterium

Stage 1 Result

	Rider	Team	Time
1	Ellen van Dijk (NED)	Vrienden van het Platteland	1h 31' 03"
2	Zhao Na (CHN)	Giant Pro Cycling Team	s.t.
3	Jaccolien Wallaard (NED)	Vrienden van het Platteland	s.t.
4	Debby Mansveld (NED)	Vlaanderen-Capri Sonne-T Interim	s.t.
5	Belinda Goss (AUS)	Australian National Team	s.t.

General Classification after Stage 1

	Rider	Team	Time
1	Jaccolien Wallaard (NED)	Vrienden van het Platteland	1h 30' 51"
2	Ellen van Dijk (NED)	Vrienden van het Platteland	+ 2"
3	Zhao Na (CHN)	Giant Pro Cycling Team	+ 6"
4	Belinda Goss (AUS)	Australian National Team	+ 7"
5	Debby Mansveld (NED)	Vlaanderen-Capri Sonne-T Interim	+ 8"

=== Stage 2 ===
4 June 2007 – Chongxi to Chongxi, 70.8 km (44.0 mi)

Stage 2 Result

	Rider	Team	Time
1	Belinda Goss (AUS)	Australian National Team	1h 43' 13"
2	Ellen van Dijk (NED)	Vrienden van het Platteland	s.t.
3	Zhao Na (CHN)	Giant Pro Cycling Team	s.t.
4	Wu Yunmei (CHN)	Chinese National Team	s.t.
5	Peta Mullens (AUS)	Australian National Team	s.t.

General Classification after Stage 2

	Rider	Team	Time
1	Ellen van Dijk (NED)	Vrienden van het Platteland	3h 13' 58"
2	Belinda Goss (AUS)	Australian National Team	+ 3"
3	Jaccolien Wallaard (NED)	Vrienden van het Platteland	+ 3"
4	Zhao Na (CHN)	Giant Pro Cycling Team	+ 8"
5	Debby Mansveld (NED)	Vlaanderen-Capri Sonne-T Interim	+ 14"

=== Stage 3 ===
5 June 2007 – Chongbei to Chongbei, 72.8 km (45.2 mi)

Stage 3 Result

	Rider	Team	Time
1	Belinda Goss (AUS)	Australian National Team	1h 43' 31"
2	Ellen van Dijk (NED)	Vrienden van het Platteland	s.t.
3	Zhao Na (CHN)	Giant Pro Cycling Team	s.t.
4	Jaccolien Wallaard (NED)	Vrienden van het Platteland	s.t.
5	Emma Johansson (SWE)	Vlaanderen-Capri Sonne-T Interim	s.t.

General Classification after Stage 3

	Rider	Team	Time
1	Belinda Goss (AUS)	Australian National Team	4h 57' 22"
2	Ellen van Dijk (NED)	Vrienden van het Platteland	+ 1"
3	Jaccolien Wallaard (NED)	Vrienden van het Platteland	+ 10"
4	Zhao Na (CHN)	Giant Pro Cycling Team	+ 11"
5	Debby Mansveld (NED)	Vlaanderen-Capri Sonne-T Interim	+ 18"

=== Stage 4 ===
6 June 2007 – Chongdong to Chongdong, 100 km (62.1 mi)

Stage 4 Result

	Rider	Team	Time
1	Li Meifang (CHN)	Giant Pro Cycling Team	2h 29' 26"
2	Sha Hui (CHN)	China JiangSu Team	+ 21"
3	Tang Kerong (CHN)	China JiangSu Team	+ 21"
4	Chen Jing (CHN)	China JiangSu Team	+ 21"
5	Chrissie Viljoen (RSA)	South African National Team	+ 21"

General Classification after Stage 4

	Rider	Team	Time
1	Li Meifang (CHN)	Giant Pro Cycling Team	7h 27' 03"
2	Ellen van Dijk (NED)	Vrienden van het Platteland	+ 23"
3	Belinda Goss (AUS)	Australian National Team	+ 23"
4	Chrissie Viljoen (RSA)	South African National Team	+ 29"
5	Sha Hui (CHN)	China JiangSu Team	+ 30"

== Final classifications ==
=== General classification ===
	Rider	Team	Time
1	Meifang Li (CHN)	Giant Pro Cycling Team	7h 27' 03"
2	Ellen van Dijk (NED)	Vrienden van het Platteland	+ 23"
3	Belinda Goss (AUS)	Australian National Team	+ 23"
4	Chrissie Viljoen (RSA)	South African National Team	+ 29"
5	Sha Hui (CHN)	China JiangSu Team	+ 30"
6	Wang Jun (CHN)	China JiangSu Team	+ 31"
7	Tang Kerong (CHN)	China JiangSu Team	+ 32"
8	Zhao Na (CHN)	Giant Pro Cycling Team	+ 35"
9	Jaccolien Wallaard (NED)	Vrienden van het Platteland	+ 35"
10	Chen Jing (CHN)	China JiangSu Team	+ 36"

Source is cyclingarchives.com

=== Points Classification ===
	Rider	Team	Points
1	Belinda Goss (AUS)	Australian National Team	61 points
2	Ellen van Dijk (NED)	Vrienden van het Platteland	60 points
3	Jaccolien Wallaard (NED)	Vrienden van het Platteland	60 points
4	Zhao Na (CHN)	Giant Pro Cycling Team	47 points
5	Debby Mansveld (NED)	Vlaanderen-Capri Sonne-T Interim	47 points

Source is cyclingarchives.com

=== Team Classification ===
	Team	Time
1	China JiangSu Team	22h 22' 57"
2	Giant Pro Cycling Team	+ 2"
3	China Hebei Team	+ 23"
4	South Africa National Team	+ 23"
5	Vlaanderen-Capri Sonne-T Interim	+ 32"

Source is cyclingarchives.com

== See also ==
- 2007 Tour of Chongming Island Time trial
- 2007 in women's road cycling
