= List of 2003 UCI Women's Teams and riders =

Listed below are the 2003 UCI Women's Teams that competed in 2003 women's road cycling events organized by the International Cycling Union (UCI).

== Teams overview ==
UCI code	Team Name	Country
HCT	@Home Cycling Team	Netherlands
ADO	Acca Due O Pasta Zara Lorena Camicie	Lithuania
AGS	Ausra Gruodis-Safi	Lithuania
BIP	Bik–Powerplate	Netherlands
BON	Bonda–Lukowski	Poland
CHL	Charly Lietzsport	Austria
RON	Equipe Cycliste Rona-Esker	Canada
NUR	Equipe Nürnberger Versicherung	Germany
FAR	Team Farm Frites–Hartol	Netherlands
MAZ	G.S. Mazza	Switzerland
NRG	Nobili–Road Runner–Guerciotti Cycling Team	Italy
OND	Ondernemers van Nature	Netherlands
PRA	Prato Bike-Aki	Italy
PMB	Prato Marathon Bike	Russia
MIC	S.C. Michela Fanini Record Rox	Italy
SAW	Saturn Cycling Team	United States
TMO	T-Mobile Women's Cycling Team	United States
AUR	Team 2002 Aurora Rsm	San Marino
CAT	Team Catalunya–Aliverti–Kookai	Spain
NEX	Team Next 125	Switzerland
TSA	Team S.A.T.S	Denmark
TVB	Team Ton Van Bemmelen Sports	Netherlands
USC	USC Chirio Forno D'Asolo	Italy
VBA	Victory Brewing / Amoroso's Cycling	Canada
VIT	Vitron–Wilstra	Netherlands
VLL	Vlaanderen–T-Interim Ladies Team	Belgium

== Cyclists ==
=== Team T-Mobile ===
Ages as of 1 January 2003.

Rider	Date of birth
Kim Anderson (USA)	January 28, 1968 (aged 34)
Kristin Armstrong (USA)	August 11, 1973 (aged 29)
Dotsie Bausch (USA)	March 6, 1973 (aged 29)
Katrina Berger-Grove (USA)	April 9, 1974 (aged 28)
Kimberly Bruckner Baldwin (USA)	June 19, 1970 (aged 32)
Deirdre Demet-Barry (USA)	October 8, 1972 (aged 30)

Rider	Date of birth
Sarah Hammer (USA)	August 18, 1983 (aged 19)
Mari Holden Paulsen (USA)	March 30, 1971 (aged 31)
Kristin Johnson (USA)	December 31, 1980 (aged 22)
Lara Kroepsh (USA)	November 27, 1978 (aged 24)
Amber Neben (USA)	February 18, 1975 (aged 27)
Stacey Peters (USA)	July 1, 1969 (aged 33)
