= 2007 Omloop van Borsele =

Race details
- Dates: 12 May 2007
- Stages: 1
- Distance: 120 km (75 mi)
- Winning time: 3h 10' 43"

Results
	Winner	Marianne Vos (the Netherlands)	(Team DSB Bank)
	Second	Regina Bruins (the Netherlands)	(Team Ton van Bemmelen-Odysis)
	Third	Ellen van Dijk (the Netherlands)	(Vrienden van het Platteland)

The 2007 Omloop van Borsele was the 6th running of the Omloop van Borsele, a single-day women's cycling race. It was held on 12 May 2007 over a distance of 120 kilometres (74.6 miles) in 's-Heerenhoek, the Netherlands. It was rated by the UCI as a 1.2 category race.

Marianne Vos won the 2007 Omloop van Borsele in a sprint of Regina Bruins. Ellen van Dijk finished third by winning the side by side sprint of Roxane Knetemann at 1' 18" of Vos.

== Results ==
	Cyclist	Team	Time
1	Marianne Vos (NED)	Team DSB Bank	3h 10' 43"
2	Regina Bruins (NED)	Team Ton van Bemmelen-Odysis	s.t.
3	Ellen van Dijk (NED)	Vrienden van het Platteland	+ 1' 18"
4	Roxane Knetemann (NED)	AA-Drink Cycling Team	+ 1' 18"
5	Elizabeth Armitstead (GBR)	Global Racing Team	+ 2' 16"
6	Trine Schmidt (DEN)	Team Flexpoint	+ 2' 16"
7	Liesbet De Vocht (BEL)	Lotto–Belisol Ladies Team	+ 2' 16"
8	Kirsten Wild (NED)	AA-Drink Cycling Team	+ 2' 19"
9	Sissy van Alebeek (NED)	Team Ton van Bemmelen-Odysis	+ 2' 34"
10	Arenda Grimberg (NED)	Team Ton van Bemmelen-Odysis	+ 3' 48"

== See also ==
- 2007 in women's road cycling
