= 2008 Dutch National Time Trial Championships – Women's time trial =

Women's time trial
2008 Dutch National Time Trial Championships

Race details
- Dates: 31 August 2008
- Stages: 1
- Distance: 22.8 km (14.2 mi)
- Winning time: 31' 15"

Results
	Winner	Mirjam Melchers	(Team Flexpoint)
	Second	Kirsten Wild	(Cervélo Test Team)
	Third	Loes Gunnewijk	(Team HTC-Columbia Women)

The women's time trial of the 2008 Dutch National Time Trial Championships cycling event took place on 31 August 2008 in and around Oudenbosch, the Netherlands. The competition was run over a 22.8 km course. 31 cyclists participated in the contest. Ellen van Dijk was the defending champion.

Mirjam Melchers won the time trial in a time of 31' 15" ahead of Kirsten Wild and Loes Gunnewijk.

== Final classification ==
Rank	Rider	Team	Time
1	Mirjam Melchers	Team Flexpoint	31’ 15”
2	Kirsten Wild	Team AA Drink-leontien.nl	+ 0.3”
3	Loes Gunnewijk	Team Flexpoint	+ 18”
4	Ellen van Dijk	Vrienden van het Platteland	+ 22”
5	Iris Slappendel	Team Flexpoint	+ 37”
6	Vera Koedooder	Lotto-Belisol	+ 47”
7	Annemiek van Vleuten	Vrienden van het Platteland	+ 01’ 01”
8	Esther van der Zwaan	-	+ 01’ 08”
9	Suzanne de Goede	Nurnberger Versicherung	+ 01’ 08”
10	Loes Markerink	Team Flexpoint	+ 01’ 09”
11	Chantal Blaak	Team AA Drink-leontien.nl	+ 01’ 42”
12	Natalie Van Gogh	Swabo Ladies	+ 01’ 45”
13	Marieke van Wanroij	Team DSB Bank	+ 01’ 52”
14	Elise Van Hage	Team Flexpoint	+ 01’ 56”
15	Suzanne van Veen	Team Flexpoint	+ 02’ 08”
16	Irene van den Broek	Team AA Drink-leontien.nl	+ 02’ 09”
17	Danielle Bekkering	Team DSB Bank	+ 02’ 11”
18	Linda Van Rijen	Team DSB Bank	+ 02’ 15”
19	Marieke van Nek	Cycling Team People's Trust	+ 02’ 31”
20	Rixt Meijer	Cycling Team People's Trust	+ 02’ 39”
21	Anne de Wildt	Moving Ladies	+ 02’ 50”
22	Yvonne Baltus	Ton van Bemmelen-Odysis	+ 02’ 50”
23	Liesbeth Bakker	Vrienden van het Platteland	+ 02’ 50”
24	Janny Kleinjan	-	+ 02’ 56”
25	Marlijn Binnendijk	Team AA Drink-leontien.nl	+ 02’ 57”
26	Judith Visser	NWV Groningen	+ 02’ 57”
27	Regina Bruins	Ton van Bemmelen-Odysis	+ 03’ 03”
28	Mariëlle Kerste	Merida Ladies Cycling Team	+ 03’ 04”
29	Maria Sterk	-	+ 03’ 05”
30	Marion Bax	-	+ 03’ 29”
31	Monique van de Ree	Dura Vermeer Cycling Team	+ 04’ 41”

Results from cqranking.com and cyclingarchives.com
