= 2001 UCI Road World Championships – Women's time trial =

Women's time trial
2001 UCI Road World Championships
- Rainbow jersey

Race details
- Dates: 10 October 2001 in Lisbon, Portugal
- Stages: 1
- Distance: 19.2 km (11.9 mi)
- Winning time: 29' 08.55"

Medalists
	Gold	Jeannie Longo (FRA)
	Silver	Nicole Brändli (SUI)
	Bronze	Teodora Ruano (ESP)

The Women's time trial at the 2001 UCI Road World Championships took place over a distance of 19.2 kilometres (11.9 miles) in Lisbon, Portugal on 10 October 2001.

== Final classification ==
Rank	Rider	Country	Time
1st place, gold medalist(s)	Jeannie Longo	France	29' 08"
2nd place, silver medalist(s)	Nicole Brändli	Switzerland	+ 0"
3rd place, bronze medalist(s)	Teodora Ruano	Spain	+ 44"
4	Rasa Polikevičiūtė	Lithuania	+ 46"
5	Judith Arndt	Germany	+ 55"
6	Mari Holden	United States	+ 1' 26"
7	Anna Millward	Australia	+ 1' 26"
8	Mirjam Melchers	Netherlands	+ 1' 32"
9	Diana Žiliūtė	Lithuania	+ 1' 32"
10	Priska Doppmann	Switzerland	+ 1' 40"
11	Fabiana Luperini	Italy	+ 1' 42"
12	Alessandra Cappellotto	Italy	+ 1' 48"
13	Olga Slyusareva	Russia	+ 1' 53"
14	Kimberly Bruckner	United States	+ 2' 00"
15	Leah Goldstein	Canada	+ 2' 05"
16	Anne Samplonius	Canada	+ 2' 07"
17	Hanka Kupfernagel	Germany	+ 2' 21"
18	Bogumiła Matusiak	Poland	+ 2' 24"
19	Elena Tchalykh	Russia	+ 2' 30"
20	Solrun Flataas	Norway	+ 2' 37"
21	Pia Sundstedt	Finland	+ 2' 43"
22	Sara Carrigan	Australia	+ 2' 43"
23	Jenny Algelid	Sweden	+ 2' 48"
24	Lada Kozlíková	Czech Republic	+ 2' 51"
25	Tetyana Andrushchenko	Ukraine	+ 2' 56"
26	Doris Posch	Austria	+ 3' 00"
27	Sari Saarelainen	Finland	+ 3' 09"
28	Katrina Berger	United States	+ 3' 16"
29	Lisbeth Simper	Denmark	+ 3' 22"
30	Séverine Desbouys	France	+ 3' 37"
31	Kirsty Robb	New Zealand	+ 3' 59"
32	Wenche Stensvold	Norway	+ 4' 07"
33	Flor Delgadillo Ruiz	Colombia	+ 4' 12"
34	Miho Oki	Japan	+ 4' 36"
35	Monika Tyburska	Poland	+ 5' 00"
36	Ine Wannijn	Belgium	+ 5' 08"
37	Martha Luz Lopez	Colombia	+ 5' 37"
38	Anastasia Pastourmatzi	Greece	+ 9.07"
