= 2008 Chrono Champenois – Trophée Européen =

2008 Chrono Champenois - Trophée Européen
Race details
- Dates: 14 September 2008
- Stages: 1
- Distance: 33.4 km (20.8 mi)
- Winning time: 44' 42"

Results
	Winner	Karin Thürig (Switzerland)	(Cervélo Lifeforce Pro Cycling Team)
	Second	Loes Gunnewijk (the Netherlands)	(Team Flexpoint)
	Third	Amber Neben (United States of America)	(Team Flexpoint)

The 2008 Chrono Champenois – Trophée Européen was the 10th running of the Chrono Champenois - Trophée Européen, a women's individual time trial bicycle race. It was held on 14 September 2008 over a distance of 33.4 kilometres (20.8 miles) in France. It was rated by the UCI as a 1.1 category race.

== Results ==
	Cyclist	Team	Time
1	Karin Thürig (SUI)	Cervélo Lifeforce Pro Cycling Team	44' 42"
2	Loes Gunnewijk (NED)	Team Flexpoint	+ 1' 40"
3	Amber Neben (USA)	Team Flexpoint	+ 1' 51"
4	Regina Bruins (NED)	Netherlands national team	+ 1' 58"
5	Mirjam Melchers (NED)	Team Flexpoint	+ 2' 05"
6	Kathryn Watt (AUS)	Team Lot-et-Garonne	+ 2' 40"
7	Ellen van Dijk (NED)	Vrienden van het Platteland	+ 2' 49"
8	An Van Rie (BEL)	Vrienden van het Platteland	+ 3' 07"
9	Pascale Schnider (SUI)	Cervélo Lifeforce Pro Cycling Team	+ 3' 50"
10	Grace Verbeke (BEL)	Lotto-Belisol Ladies Team	+ 4' 19"

== See also ==
- 2007 Chrono Champenois - Trophée Européen
- 2010 Chrono Champenois - Trophée Européen
- 2013 Chrono Champenois - Trophée Européen
