= 2007 Tour of Chongming Island Time trial =

Race details
- Dates: 2 June 2007
- Stages: 1
- Distance: 20 km (12.43 mi)
- Winning time: 27' 34"

Results
	Winner	Yong Li Liu (CHN)	(Giant Pro Cycling)
	Second	Meifang Li (CHN)	(Giant Pro Cycling)
	Third	Ellen van Dijk (NED)	(Vrienden van het Platteland)

The 2007 Tour of Chongming Island Time trial was the first time trial to be held in the Tour of Chongming Island. It was held on 2 July 2007 over a distance of 20 kilometres (12.4 miles) and was rated by the UCI as a 1.2 category race. A total of 54 elite female cyclists took part in the race.

== General standings (top 10) ==
	Cyclists	Team	Time
1	Yong Li Liu (CHN)	Giant Pro Cycling	27' 34"
2	Meifang Li (CHN)	Giant Pro Cycling	+ 1' 26"
3	Ellen van Dijk (NED)	Vrienden van het Platteland	+ 1' 42"
4	Li Wang (CHN)	China	+ 1' 57"
5	Jing Chen (CHN)	China	+ 2' 49"
6	Xiaomei Huang (CHN)	China	+ 3' 02"
7	Yunmei Wu (CHN)	China	+ 3' 13"
8	Kerong Tang (CHN)	China Jiangsu	+ 3' 28"
9	Louise Kerr (AUS)	Australia	+ 3' 35"
10	Meng Lang (CHN)	Giant Pro Cycling	+ 3' 43"

Results from CQ ranking.

== See also ==
- 2007 Tour of Chongming Island Stage race
