= Tour of Chongming Island =

Chinese multi-day road cycling race

Race details
- Date: May
- Region: Shanghai, China
- Local name: 崇明岛之旅 (in Chinese)
- Discipline: Road
- Competition: UCI Women's World Tour (since 2016)
- Type: Stage race
- Web site: www.shcmty.net/renda/node13293/node13409/index.html

History
- First edition: 2007
- Editions: 16 (as of 2025)
- First winner: Li Meifang (CHN)
- Most wins: Li Meifang (CHN); Ina-Yoko Teutenberg (GER); Kirsten Wild (NED); Chloe Hosking (AUS) (2 wins)
- Most recent: Anne Knijnenburg (NED)

The Tour of Chongming Island International Cycling Race is an annual elite women's road bicycle racing stage race held in Shanghai, China, named after Chongming Island.

The Tour previously consisted of two races: a stage race and a one-day race. Between 2007 and 2009, the one-day race was a time trial; in 2010, the time trial was replaced by a one-day race, referred to as the Tour of Chongming Island World Cup, that was part of the UCI Women's Road World Cup until 2015. From 2016, only the stage race was held, part of the new UCI Women's World Tour. The 2020, 2021 and 2022 editions of the race were cancelled due to the COVID-19 pandemic in mainland China.

Stages take place on the islands of Chongming and Changxing in the Yangtze estuary over mostly flat routes, with Cycling News calling the race a "sprinters paradise".

== Past winners ==
=== Stage race ===
Year	Winner	Second	Third
2007	Li Meifang (CHN)	Ellen van Dijk (NED)	Belinda Goss (AUS)
2008	Li Meifang (CHN)	Meng Lang (CHN)	Sha Hui (CHN)
2009	Chloe Hosking (AUS)	Marlen Jöhrend (GER)	Zhao Na (CHN)
2010	Ina-Yoko Teutenberg (GER)	Kirsten Wild (NED)	Rochelle Gilmore (AUS)
2011	Ina-Yoko Teutenberg (GER)	Annemiek van Vleuten (NED)	Monia Baccaille (ITA)
2012	Melissa Hoskins (AUS)	Monia Baccaille (ITA)	Liesbet De Vocht (BEL)
2013	Annette Edmondson (AUS)	Chloe Hosking (AUS)	Lucy Garner (GBR)
2014	Kirsten Wild (NED)	Shelley Olds (USA)	Giorgia Bronzini (ITA)
2015	Kirsten Wild (NED)	Roxane Fournier (FRA)	Annalisa Cucinotta (ITA)
2016	Chloe Hosking (AUS)	Huang Ting-ying (TPE)	Leah Kirchmann (CAN)
2017	Jolien D'Hoore (BEL)	Kirsten Wild (NED)	Chloe Hosking (AUS)
2018	Charlotte Becker (GER)	Shannon Malseed (AUS)	Anastasiia Iakovenko (RUS)
2019	Lorena Wiebes (NED)	Jutatip Maneephan (THA)	Lotte Kopecky (BEL)
2020-2022 races cancelled due to the COVID-19 pandemic in mainland China
2023	Chiara Consonni (ITA)	Mylène de Zoete (NED)	Daria Pikulik (POL)
2024	Marta Lach (POL)	Mylène de Zoete (NED)	Scarlett Souren (NED)
2025	Anne Knijnenburg (NED)	Sofie van Rooijen (NED)	Tamara Dronova

=== Individual time trial ===
Year	Winner	Second	Third
2007	Liu Yongli (CHN)	Li Meifang (CHN)	Ellen van Dijk (NED)
2008	Li Meifang (CHN)	Wang Li (CHN)	Liu Yongli (CHN)
2009	Bridie O'Donnell (AUS)	Svitlana Halyuk (UKR)	Madeleine Sandig (GER)

=== World Cup ===
Year	Winner	Second	Third
2010	Ina-Yoko Teutenberg (GER)	Kirsten Wild (NED)	Rochelle Gilmore (AUS)
2011	Ina-Yoko Teutenberg (GER)	Lizzie Armitstead (GBR)	Charlotte Becker (GER)
2012	Shelley Olds (USA)	Melissa Hoskins (AUS)	Monia Baccaille (ITA)
2013	Tetyana Ryabchenko (UKR)	Giorgia Bronzini (ITA)	Amy Pieters (NED)
2014	Kirsten Wild (NED)	Elena Cecchini (ITA)	Giorgia Bronzini (ITA)
2015	Giorgia Bronzini (ITA)	Kirsten Wild (NED)	Fanny Riberot (FRA)

== Jerseys ==
As of 2014 edition

denotes the leader of the overall race.
denotes the leader of the points classification.
