= 2008 Team Flexpoint season =

2008 Team Flexpoint
- UCI Team ranking: 6th
- Manager: Jean-Paul van Poppel

Season victories
- One-day races: 2
- Stage race overall: 1
- Stage race stages: 5
- Best ranked rider: Susanne Ljungskog (12th)

The 2008 women's road cycling season was the fourth season for the 2008 UCI Women's Cycling Team Team Flexpoint (UCI code: FLX), which began as Buitenpoort - Flexpoint Team in 2005.

== Roster ==
- (Netherlands) Elisabeth Braam
- (Netherlands) Saskia Elemans
- (Netherlands) Loes Gunnewijk
- (Netherlands) Britt Jochems
- (Netherlands) Jacobien Kanis
- (Germany) Bianca Knöpfle
- (Sweden) Susanne Ljungskog
- (Netherlands) Loes Markerink
- (Netherlands) Mirjam Melchers
- (United States) Amber Neben
- (Denmark) Trine Schmidt
- (Netherlands) Iris Slappendel
- (Netherlands) Adriene Snijder
- (Norway) Anita Valen
- (Netherlands) Suzanne van Veen
- (Netherlands) Elise van Hage

== Results ==
=== Season victories ===
Single day and stage races 2008
Date	Nation	Race	Cat.	Winner
27 April	Belgium	GP Stad Roeselare	1.2	(Netherlands) Loes Markerink
May	Netherlands	7-Dorpenomloop Aalburg	1.2	(Netherlands) Loes Markerink
	El Salvador	Stage 6 Vuelta Ciclista Femenina a el Salvador	2.2	(Norway) Anita Valen
18 June	France	Stage 2 Grande Boucle Féminine Internationale	2.2	(Netherlands) Loes Markerink
5 July	Italy	Prologue Giro d'Italia Femminile	2.1	(Netherlands) Mirjam Melchers
6 September	Netherlands	Stage 5 Holland Ladies Tour	2.2	(Netherlands) Loes Markerink
September	France	Stage 6 Tour de l'Ardèche	2.2	(Sweden) Susanne Ljungskog
September	France	Overall Tour de l'Ardèche	2.2	(United States) Amber Neben

National, Continental and World champions 2009
Date	Discipline	Jersey	Winner
31 August	Dutch National Time Trial Champion		Mirjam Melchers
24 September	Time Trial World Champion		(United States) Amber Neben

== Results in major races ==
Results in other major single day races
Date	Race (Note: Riders are in these championships part of the national team)	Rider	Place
28 March	Track Cycling World Championships – Women's team pursuit	(Netherlands) Elise van Hage (with Ellen van Dijk and Marlijn Binnendijk)	6th
5 July	European Road Championships – Women's under-23 road race	(Netherlands) Mirjam Melchers	30th
23 September	Road World Championships – Women's time trial	(United States) Amber Neben	1st place, gold medalist(s)
24 September	Road World Championships – Women's road race	(United States) Amber Neben	22nd

== Other achievements ==
=== Dutch national records, team pursuit ===
The women's 3000 m team pursuit track cycling discipline was introduced at the 2007–08 track cycling season. Elise van Hage was once part of the team when they broke the Dutch national record. This is not the current record anymore.

Time	Speed (km/h)	Cyclists	Event	Location of race	Date	Ref
3:31.596	51.040	Elise van Hage (with Ellen van Dijk and Marlijn Binnendijk)	2008 UCI Track Cycling World Championships (Qualifying)	(United Kingdom) Manchester	28 March 2008	

== UCI World Ranking ==
The team finished 19th in the UCI ranking for teams.

Individual UCI World Ranking
Rank	Rider	Points
12	(Sweden) Susanne Ljungskog	397
13	(United States) Amber Neben	393
43	(Netherlands) Loes Markerink	157.5
44	(Netherlands) Mirjam Melchers-Van Poppel	142.66
65	(Netherlands) Loes Gunnewijk	89.5
90	(Denmark) Trine Schmidt	61.5
