= Saskia Elemans =

Dutch racing cyclist

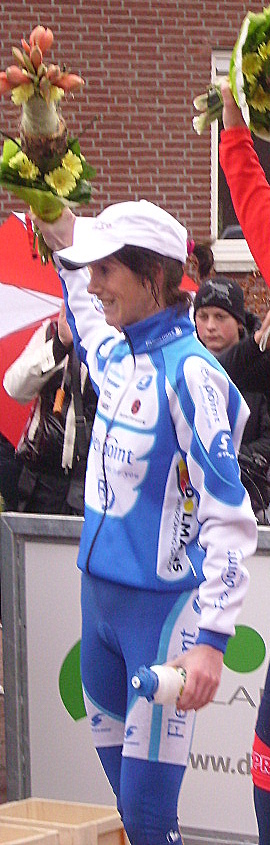

Personal information
- Born: 11 March 1977 (age 49) Nijmegen, Netherlands

Cycling career
- Sport: Cycling
- Discipline: Cyclo-cross

Professional teams
- 1998: Hartol
- 2002: Neckermann Benelux
- 2003–2005: @Work Cycling Team
- 2008–2009: Team Flexpoint

Saskia Elemans (born 11 March 1977 in Nijmegen) is a Dutch professional cyclo-cross racing cyclist.

== Career highlights ==
2002

- 1st in Boxtel, Cyclo-cross (F) (NED)

2003

- 2nd in National Championship, Mountainbike, Elite, The Netherlands (F) (NED)

2004

- 2nd in Eindhoven, Cyclo-cross (F) (NED)

2007

- 2nd in Moergestel, Cyclo-cross (F) (NED)
- 2nd in Veghel-Eerde, Cyclo-cross (F) (NED)
- 2nd in Overijse, Cyclo-cross (F), Overijse (BEL)
- 3rd in Loenhout, Cyclo-cross (F) (BEL)

2008 (Team Flexpoint)

- 3rd in National Championship, Cyclo-cross, Elite, The Netherlands (F), Sint Michielsgestel (NED)
- 1st in Surhuisterveen Centrumcross (F) (NED)
