= 2007 Chrono Champenois – Trophée Européen =

2007 Chrono Champenois - Trophée Européen
Race details
- Dates: 16 September 2007
- Stages: 1
- Distance: 33.4 km (20.8 mi)
- Winning time: 45' 49"

Results
	Winner	Karin Thürig (Switzerland)	(Raleigh Lifeforce Pro Cycling Team)
	Second	Amber Neben (United States of America)	(Team Flexpoint)
	Third	Mirjam Melchers (the Netherlands)	(Team Flexpoint)

The 2007 Chrono Champenois – Trophée Européen was the 9th running of the Chrono Champenois - Trophée Européen, a women's individual time trial bicycle race. It was held on 16 September 2007 over a distance of 33.4 kilometres (20.8 miles) in France. It was rated by the UCI as a 1.1 category race.

== Results ==
	Cyclist	Team	Time
1	Karin Thürig (SUI)	Raleigh Lifeforce Pro Cycling Team	45' 49"
2	Amber Neben (USA)	Team Flexpoint	+ 7"
3	Mirjam Melchers (NED)	Team Flexpoint	+ 16"
4	Emma Pooley (GBR)	Team Specialized Designs for Women	+ 42"
5	Ellen van Dijk (NED)	Vrienden van het Platteland	+ 1' 56"
6	An Van Rie (BEL)	AA-Drink Cycling Team	+ 2' 00"
7	Bridie O'Donnell (AUS)	Kingdom Diamond	+ 2' 14"
8	Pascale Schneider (SUI)	Raleigh Lifeforce Pro Cycling Team	+ 3' 00"
9	Caroline Steffen (SUI)	Raleigh Lifeforce Pro Cycling Team	+ 3' 51"
10	Yongli Liu (CHN)	Giant Pro Cycling	+ 4' 00"

== See also ==
- 2008 Chrono Champenois - Trophée Européen
- 2010 Chrono Champenois - Trophée Européen
- 2013 Chrono Champenois - Trophée Européen
