= List of 2004 UCI Women's Teams and riders =

Listed below are the 2004 UCI Women's Teams that competed in 2004 women's road cycling events organized by the International Cycling Union (UCI).

== Teams overview ==
UCI code	Team Name	Country
HCT	@Home Cycling Team	Netherlands
ASV	Acqua & Sapone–Valenti Argenti	Italy
AGS	Ausra-Gruodis	Lithuania
BAS	Basis Aude	Canada
BKG	Bik–Gios	Netherlands
BIZ	Bizkaia–Panda Software–Durango	Spain
RON	Equipe Cycliste Rona	Canada
NUR	Equipe Nürnberger Versicherung	Germany
LIE	Lietzsport Cycling	Austria
MKS	Mks Start Peugeot Andrzej Kita Lublin	Poland
NRG	Nobili Rubinetterie-Guerciotti	Italy
OND	Ondernemers van Nature-Vrienden van het Platteland	Netherlands
RCE	Rc Elk-Haus Tirol	Austria
MIC	S.C. Michela Fanini Record Rox	Italy
SAF	Safi–Pasta Zara–Manhattan	Lithuania
TMP	Team T-Mobile Women	United States
ALI	Team Aliverti-Bianchi-Kookai	Lithuania
FAR	Team Farm Frites–Hartol	Netherlands
LGF	Team Let's Go Finland	Finland
NEX	Team Next 125	Switzerland
TSA	Team S.A.T.S.	Denmark
TVB	Team Ton Van Bemmelen Sports	Netherlands
TSC	Therme Skin Care	Netherlands
USC	USC Chirio Forno d'Asolo	Italy
VIC	Victory Brewing Cycling Team	Canada
VIT	Vitron–Wilstra	Netherlands
VLL	Vlaanderen-T-Interim Univega Ladies Team	Belgium

== Cyclists ==
=== Team T-Mobile Women ===
Ages as of 1 January 2004.

Rider	Date of birth
Kim Anderson (USA)	January 28, 1968 (aged 35)
Kristin Armstrong (USA)	August 11, 1973 (aged 30)
Dotsie Bausch (USA)	March 6, 1973 (aged 30)
Kimberly Bruckner Baldwin (USA)	June 19, 1970 (aged 33)
Deirdre Demet-Barry (USA)	October 8, 1972 (aged 31)
Lynn Gaggioli-Brotzman (USA)	September 12, 1976 (aged 27)

Rider	Date of birth
Mari Holden Paulsen (USA)	March 30, 1971 (aged 32)
Lara Kroepsh (USA)	November 27, 1978 (aged 25)
Tanya Lindenmuth (USA)	May 9, 1979 (aged 24)
Amber Neben (USA)	February 18, 1975 (aged 28)
Stacey Peters (USA)	July 1, 1969 (aged 34)
