= 2005 in women's road cycling =

== Elite Women ==
=== January–March ===
Date	Race	Location	Notes	Winner	Nationality
02/27	World Cup – Geelong	Australia	World Cup	Rochelle Gilmore	AUS
03/06	World Cup – Wellington	New Zealand	World Cup	Suzanne de Goede	NED
03/19	Primavera Rosa	Italy	World Cup	Trixi Worrack	GER

=== April–June ===
Date	Race	Location	Notes	Winner	Nationality
04/03	Tour of Flanders	Belgium	World Cup	Mirjam Melchers	NED
04/08 – 04/10	Novilon Internationale Damesronde van Drenthe	The Netherlands			
04/20	La Flèche Wallonne Féminine	Belgium	World Cup	Nicole Cooke	GBR
04/24	Berner-Rundfahrt – Tour de Berne	Switzerland			
05/01	Souvenir Magali Pache Lausanne	Switzerland			
05/04 – 05/06	Vuelta a Castilla y León	Spain			
05/08	Gran Premio Castilla y Leon	Spain	World Cup	Susanne Ljungskog	SWE
05/12 – 05/22	Tour de l'Aude Cycliste Féminin	France		Amber Neben	United States
05/28	Coupe du Monde Cycliste Féminine de Montréal	Canada	World Cup	Geneviève Jeanson	Canada
05/30 – 06/02	Tour du Grand Montréal	Canada			
06/04	Wachovia Liberty Classic	United States		Ina-Yoko Teutenberg	GER
06/09 – 06/12	Emakumeen Bira	Spain		Svetlana Bubnenkova	RUS
06/15 – 06/19	Giro del Trentino Alto Adige-Südtirol	Italy			

=== July–September ===
Date	Race	Location	Notes	Winner	Nationality
07/01 – 07/10	Giro d'Italia Femminile	Italy			
07/19 – 07/24	International Thüringen Rundfahrt der Frauen	Germany			
08/07	Sparkassen Giro	Germany			
08/20	GP of Wales – Newport	United Kingdom	World Cup	Judith Arndt	GER
08/27	GP Ouest France – Plouay	France	World Cup	Noemi Cantele	ITA
08/29 – 09/03	Holland Ladies Tour	The Netherlands			
09/04	Lowland International Rotterdam Tour	Netherlands	World Cup	Ina-Yoko Teutenberg	GER
09/11	Rund um die Nürnberger Altstadt	Germany	World Cup	Giorgia Bronzini	ITA
09/13 – 09/18	Giro della Toscana Int. Femminile – Memorial Michela Fanini	Italy			
09/18	Chrono Champenois – Trophée Européen	France	Time Trial		
09/21	World Time Trial Championship	Spain	Time Trial	Karin Thürig	SUI
09/24	World Road Race Championship	Spain		Regina Schleicher	GER
09/30 – 10/04	Vuelta Ciclista Femenina a el Salvador	El Salvador			

=== October–December ===
No major races.

== Final rankings ==
=== Women's World Cup ===
Rank	Rider	Nationality	Team	Nationality	Notes	Points
1	Oenone Wood	AUS	Nürnberger Versicherung	GER		378
2	Susanne Ljungskog	SWE	Buitenpoort - Flexpoint Team	NED		299
3	Mirjam Melchers	NED	Buitenpoort - Flexpoint Team	NED		255
4	Giorgia Bronzini	ITA	Italy	ITA		185
5	Judith Arndt	GER	Nürnberger Versicherung	GER		184

=== UCI Road Rankings ===
Source
