= 2007 in women's road cycling =

== News ==
=== January ===
- 1 – Tracy Clark wins the first race of 2007, which is the first stage of the 2007 Tour de Vineyards. She finishes in front of Carissa Wilkes and Annelies Basten.
- 4 – Serena Sheridan wins two stages in a row to claim the overall win in the 2007 Tour de Vineyards.
- 11 – Carla Ryan becomes Australian time trial champion by finishing first position, 10 seconds before double 1992 Summer Olympics medalist Kathy Watt.
- 13 – Katie Mactier finishes in first position, being the front rider of the leading group crossing the finish in the Australian road cycling championships.
- 13 – Alison Shanks wins her second national title in three days after winning both the time trial and the road race in the championships of New Zealand.
- 20 – Jenny MacPherson wins her third consecutive Tour Down Under by finishing in front of Belinda Goss in the last stage to claim the victory as both riders were equal in points.
- 28 – Leontien van Moorsel announces her pregnancy and expects her first child in a few months time. An earlier pregnancy brought her a miscarriage.

== UCI Road World rankings ==
Top-ranked individual	Second-ranked individual	Third-ranked individual	Top-ranked team	Top-ranked nation
Marianne Vos (NED); Team DSB Bank	Nicole Cooke (GBR); Raleigh Lifeforce Creation HB Pro Cycling Team	Judith Arndt (GER); T-Mobile Women	T-Mobile Women	Germany

== World championships ==
Race	Date	Winner	Second	Third
World Championship Time Trial	September	Hanka Kupfernagel (GER)	Kristin Armstrong (USA)	Christiane Soeder (AUT)
World Championship Road Race	23 September	Marta Bastianelli (ITA)	Marianne Vos (NED)	Giorgia Bronzini (ITA)

== UCI World Cup ==
	Date	Race	Winner
#1	3 March	(Australia) Geelong World Cup	Nicole Cooke (GBR)
#2	8 April	(Belgium) Tour of Flanders for Women	Nicole Cooke (GBR)
#3	12 April	(Netherlands) Ronde van Drenthe	Adrie Visser (NED)
#4	25 April	(Belgium) La Flèche Wallonne Féminine	Marianne Vos (NED)
#5	13 May	(Switzerland) Tour de Berne	Edita Pučinskaitė (LTU)
#6	2 June	(Canada) Coupe du Monde Cycliste Féminine de Montréal	Fabiana Luperini (ITA)
#7	5 August	(Sweden) Open de Suède Vårgårda	Chantal Beltman (NED)
#8	1 September	(France) GP de Plouay	Noemi Cantele (ITA)
#9	16 September	(Germany) Rund um die Nürnberger Altstadt	Marianne Vos (NED)

== Single day races (1.1 and 1.2) ==
Race	Date	Cat.	Winner	Second	Third
(Brazil) Copa América de Ciclismo	7 January	1.2	(Brazil) Clemilda Silva	(Brazil) Debora Gerhard	(Brazil) Rosane Kirch
(El Salvador) Grand Prix de Santa Ana	14 March	1.2			
(Belgium) Omloop Het Volk / Circuit Het Volk	18 March	1.2	Mie Bekker Lacota (DEN)	Monica Holler (SWE)	Jaccolien Wallaard (NED)
(Italy) Giro dei Comuni Ribardella-Montescudaio	24 March	1.2			
(Italy) GP Costa Etrusca	25 March	1.2			
(Italy) Trofeo Alfredo Binda-Comune di Cittiglio	1 April	1.1			
(Netherlands) Drentse 8 van Dwingeloo	12 April	1.1			
(Netherlands) Novilon Internationale Damesronde van Drenthe	15 April	1.1	Giorgia Bronzini (ITA)	Marianne Vos (NED)	Ina-Yoko Teutenberg (GER)
(Netherlands) Ronde van Gelderland	21 April	1.2			
(Italy) GP Liberazione	25 April	1.2			
(Belgium) GP Stad Roeselare	29 April	1.2			
(Switzerland) Souvenir Magali Pache Lausanne	6 May	1.1			
(Netherlands) Omloop van Borsele	12 May	1.2			
(China) Tour of Chongming Island Time Trial	2 June	1.2			
(Netherlands) Omloop Door Middag-Humsterland WE	9 June	1.2			
(United States) Commerce Bank Liberty Classic	10 June	1.1			
(Spain) Durango-Durango Emakumeen Saria	12 June	1.2			
(Germany) Sparkassen Giro	5 August	1.1			
(Netherlands) Holland Hills Classic	12 August	1.2			
(France) Trophée des Stars	4 September	1.2			
(Italy) Memorial Davide Fardelli – Cronometro Individuale	9 September	1.2			
(United States) Tour de Leelanau	15 September	1.2			
(France) Chrono Champenois – Trophée Européen	16 September	1.1	Karin Thürig (SUI)	Amber Neben (USA)	Mirjam Melchers (NED)
(France) Chrono des Nations Les Herbiers Vendée	21 October	1.1			

== Stage races (2.1 and 2.2) ==
Race	Date	Cat.	Winner	Second	Third
(New Zealand) Tour de Vineyards	1–4 January		(New Zealand) Serena Sheridan	(New Zealand) Gina Waibl	(New Zealand) Annelies Basten
(Australia) Bay Classic Series	3–7 January		(Australia) Katherine Bates	(Australia) Belinda Goss	(Australia) Nikki Egyed
(Australia) Tour Down Under	16–20 January		(Australia) Jenny MacPherson	(Australia) Belinda Goss	(Australia) Petra Mullens
(Australia) Geelong Tour	27 February – 1 March	2.2			
Tour of New Zealand	7–11 March	2.2			
(El Salvador) Vuelta Ciclista Femenina a el Salvador	15–20 March	2.2			
(Czech Republic) Gracia–Orlová	3–6 May	2.2			
Giro di San Marino	4–6 May	2.1			
(France) Tour de l'Aude Cycliste Féminin	18–27 May	2.1			
(Poland) Tour de Pologne Feminin	31 May – 3 June	2.2			
(China) Tour of Chongming Island	3–6 June	2.2	Meifang Li (CHN)	Ellen van Dijk (NED)	Belinda Goss (AUS)
(Canada) Tour du Grand Montréal	4–7 June	2.1			
(Canada) Tour de Pei	10–14 June	2.2			
(Spain) Iurreta-Emakumeen Bira	13–17 June	2.1			
(France) Grande Boucle Féminine Internationale	19–24 June	2.2			
(Netherlands) Rabobank Ster Zeeuwsche Eilanden	21–23 June	2.2			
(Italy) Giro del Trentino Alto Adige-Südtirol	22–23 June	2.1			
(Italy) Giro d'Italia Femminile	6–14 July	2.1			
(Czech Republic) Tour de Feminin – Krásná Lípa	12–15 July	2.2			
(France) Tour de Bretagne Féminin	18–22 July	2.2			
(Germany) International Thüringen Rundfahrt der Frauen	24–29 July	2.1			
(France) Tour Féminin en Limousin	26–29 July	2.2			
La Route de France Féminine	11–18 August	2.1			
(Germany) Albstadt-Frauen-Etappenrennen	21–23 August	2.2			
(France) Trophée d'Or Féminin	25–29 August	2.2			
(Netherlands) Holland Ladies Tour	3–8 September	2.2	Kristin Armstrong (USA)	Judith Arndt (GER)	Linda Villumsen (DEN)
(France) Tour Cycliste Féminin International Ardèche	11–15 September	2.2			
(Italy) Giro della Toscana Int. Femminile – Memorial Michela Fanini	18–23 September	2.1			

== See also ==
- 2007 in men's road cycling
- 2007 in track cycling
