= 2007 Dutch National Time Trial Championships – Women's time trial =

Women's time trial
2007 Dutch National Time Trial Championships

Race details
- Dates: 15 August 2007
- Stages: 1
- Distance: 22.28 km (13.84 mi)
- Winning time: 29' 41.53"

Medalists
	Gold	Ellen van Dijk	(Vrienden van het Platteland)
	Silver	Regina Bruins	(Team Ton van Bemmelen)
	Bronze	Mirjam Melchers	(Team Flexpoint)

The Women's time trial of the 2007 Dutch National Time Trial Championships cycling event took place on 15 August 2007 in and around Zaltbommel, Netherlands over a 22.28 km long flat parcours.

Ellen van Dijk (Vrienden van het Platteland) became for the first time in her career Dutch National Time Trial Champion by the elite. Van Dijk was already national time trial champion when she was a junior in 2004 and 2005. Regina Bruins finished second and Mirjam Melchers third.

== Race details ==
=== Starting list ===
Time	Rider	City
17:00	Femke Nijhof	Amsterdam
17:01	Yvonne Baltus	Wieringerwaard
17:02	Rahel Bellinga	Soest
17:03	Patricia van Loon	's Gravenmoer
17:04	Eva Heijmans	Diemen
17:05	Juliette Wigbold	Hengelo
17:06	Judith Visser	Groningen
17:07	Eva Sijm	Amsterdam
17:08	Gabrielle Rovers	Leiden
17:09	Mascha Pijnenborg	Drunen
17:10	Rixt Meijer	IJlst
17:11	Njisk Nauta	Amsterdam
17:12	Kim van Dijk	Winsum
17:13	Liesbeth Bakker	Wieringerwerf
17:14	Amanda Bongaards	De Lier
17:15	Annemiek van Vleuten	Wageningen
17:16	Sanne van Paassen	Vlierden
17:17	Monique van de Ree	Willemstad
17:18	Danielle Bekkering	Den Ham
17:19	Irene v.d. Broek	Utrecht
17:20	Elisabeth Braam	Warmenhuizen
17:21	Vera Koedooder	Bovenkarspel
17:22	Roxane Knetemann	Krommenie
17:23	Linda van Rijen	's-Hertogenbosch
17:24	Suzanne van Veen	Naaldwijk
17:25	Adrie Visser	Wieringerwerf
17:26	Loes Markerink	Raalte
17:27	Andrea Bosman	Norg
17:28	Marlijn Binnendijk	Zuid-Scharwoude
17:29	Iris Slappendel	Ouderkerk aan den IJssel
17:30	Suzanne de Goede	Zoeterwoude
17:31	Mirjam Melchers	Moergestel
17:32	Regina Bruins	Leiderdorp
17:33	Ellen van Dijk	Harmelen
17:34	Kirsten Wild	Zwolle
17:35	Loes Gunnewijk	Zwolle

Startlist from wielersupport.nl

=== Final results ===
Rank	Rider	Team	Time
1st place, gold medalist(s)	Ellen van Dijk	VVP	29’ 41.53”
2nd place, silver medalist(s)	Regina Bruins	TVB	+ 01.00”
3rd place, bronze medalist(s)	Mirjam Melchers	FLX	+ 14.12”
4	Kirsten Wild	AAD	+ 44”
5	Loes Markerink	FLX	+ 46”
6	Iris Slappendel	FLX	+ 01’ 00”
7	Loes Gunnewijk	FLX	+ 01’ 01”
8	Andrea Bosman	DSB	+ 01’ 16”
9	Suzanne de Goede	TMP	+ 01’ 20”
10	Danielle Bekkering	DSB	+ 01’ 20”
11	Vera Koedooder	DSB	+ 01’ 26”
12	Njisk Nauta	TVB	+ 01’ 56”
13	Sanne van Paassen	DSB	+ 02’ 02”
14	Irene van den Broek	AAD	+ 02’ 05”
15	Annemiek van Vleuten	-	+ 02’ 13”
16	Elisabeth Braam	TSC	+ 02’ 14”
17	Rixt Meijer	TSC	+ 02’ 14”
18	Suzanne van Veen	FLX	+ 02’ 15”
19	Adrie Visser	DSB	+ 02’ 18”
20	Linda van Rijen	DSB	+ 02’ 29”
21	Yvonne Baltus	TVB	+ 02’ 48”
22	Roxane Knetemann	AAD	+ 02’ 58”
23	Amanda Bongaards	RES	+ 03’ 03”
24	Liesbeth Bakker	VVP	+ 03’ 04”
25	Kim van Dijk	GRO	+ 03’ 19”
26	Judith Visser	GRO	+ 03’ 27”
27	Eva Heijmans	NWH	+ 03’ 43”
28	Patricia van Loon	ZWH	+ 03’ 46”
29	Femke Nijhof	LOW	+ 03’ 51”
30	Juliette Wigbold	TUB	+ 03’ 56”
31	Gabrielle Rovers	ZWH	+ 04’ 05”
32	Rahel Bellinga	-	+ 04’ 28”
33	Eva Sijm	-	+ 04’ 47”
34	Mascha Pijnenborg	HSW	+ 05’ 19”
35	Monique van de Ree	VVP	+ 05’ 43”

Results from cyclingarchives.com and cqranking.com.
