= 2010 Chrono Champenois – Trophée Européen =

2010 Chrono Champenois - Trophée Européen
Race details
- Dates: 14 September 2010
- Stages: 1
- Distance: 33.4 km (20.8 mi)
- Winning time: 45' 23"

Results
	Winner	Anne Samplonius (Canada)	(Canada national team)
	Second	Judith Arndt (Germany)	(Team HTC-Columbia Women)
	Third	Olga Zabelinskaya (Russia)	(Russia national team)

The 2010 Chrono Champenois – Trophée Européen was the 12th running of the Chrono Champenois - Trophée Européen, a women's individual time trial bicycle race in France. It was held on 12 September 2010 over a distance of 33.4 kilometres (20.8 miles). It was rated by the UCI as a 1.1 category race.

== Results ==
	Cyclist	Team	Time
1	Anne Samplonius (CAN)	Canada national team	45' 23"
2	Judith Arndt (GER)	Team HTC-Columbia Women	+ 8"
3	Olga Zabelinskaya (RUS)	Russia national team	+ 18"
4	Wendy Houvenaghel (GBR)	Great Britain national team	+ 31"
5	Julia Shaw (GBR)	-	+ 32"
6	Amber Naben (USA)	American national team	+ 1' 16"
7	Ellen van Dijk (NED)	Team HTC-Columbia Women	+ 1' 20"
8	Amber Halliday (AUS)	Australia national team	+ 1' 29"
9	Emilia Fahlin (SWE)	Team HTC-Columbia Women	+ 2' 01"
10	Vicki Whitelaw (AUS)	Lotto Ladies Team	+ 2' 03"

== See also ==
- 2007 Chrono Champenois - Trophée Européen
- 2008 Chrono Champenois - Trophée Européen
- 2013 Chrono Champenois - Trophée Européen
