= 2007 Tour de l'Aude Cycliste Féminin =

Race details
- Dates: 18–27 May 2007
- Stages: 9 + Prologue
- Winning time: 24h 13' 23"

Results
	Winner	Susanne Ljungskog (SWE)	(Team Flexpoint)
	Second	Trixi Worrack (GER)	(Equipe Nürnberger Versicherung)
	Third	Judith Arndt (GER)	(Team T-Mobile Women)
	Young rider	Marianne Vos (NED)	(Team DSB Bank)

The 2007 Tour de l'Aude Cycliste Féminin was the 23rd edition of the Tour de l'Aude Cycliste Féminin, a women's cycling stage race in France. It was rated by the UCI as a category 2.2 race and was held between 18 and 27 May 2007.

== Stages ==
=== Prologue ===
18 May 2007 – Gruissan to Gruissan, 3.9 km (2.4 mi), Individual time trial

Prologue Result

	Rider	Team	Time
1	Christiane Soeder (AUT)	Raleigh Lifeforce Pro Cycling Team	4' 43"
2	Hanka Kupfernagel (GER)	Germany national team	+5"
3	Ellen van Dijk (NED)	Vrienden van het Platteland	+5"

General Classification after the Prologue

	Rider	Team	Time
1	Christiane Soeder (AUT)	Raleigh Lifeforce Pro Cycling Team	4' 43"
2	Hanka Kupfernagel (GER)	Germany national team	+5"
3	Ellen van Dijk (NED)	Vrienden van het Platteland	+5"

=== Stage 1 ===
19 May 2007 – Port-La-Nouvelle to Port-La-Nouvelle, 115 km (71.5 mi)

Stage 1 result

	Rider	Team	Time
1	Marianne Vos (NED)	Team DSB Bank	3h 00' 54"
2	Ina-Yoko Teutenberg (GER)	Team T-Mobile Women	s.t.
3	Angéla Brodtka (SWE)	Germany national team	s.t.

General Classification after Stage 1

	Rider	Team	Time
1	Marianne Vos (NED)	Team DSB Bank	3h 05' 37"
2	Christiane Soeder (AUT)	Raleigh Lifeforce Pro Cycling Team	+0"
3	Hanka Kupfernagel (GER)	Germany national team	+5"

=== Stage 2 ===
20 May 2007 – Argeles Sur Mer to Argeles Sur Mer, 41.6 km (25.8 mi), Team time trial

Stage 2 result

	Team	Time
1	Team T-Mobile Women	55' 43"
2	Team Flexpoint	+6"
3	Equipe Nürnberger Versicherung	+33"

General Classification after Stage 2

	Rider	Team	Time
1	Judith Arndt (GER)	Team T-Mobile Women	4h 01' 29"
2	Linda Villumsen (DEN)	Team T-Mobile Women	+1"
3	Amber Neben (USA)	Team Flexpoint	+9"

=== Stage 3 ===
21 May 2007 – Lezignan Corbières to Lezignan Corbières, 122 km (75.8 mi)

Stage 3 result

	Rider	Team	Time
1	Marianne Vos (NED)	Team DSB Bank	3h 14' 01"
2	Angela Brodtka (GER)	Germany national team	s.t.
3	Marina Jaunâtre (FRA)	France national team	s.t.

General Classification after Stage 3

	Rider	Team	Time
1	Judith Arndt (GER)	Team T-Mobile Women	7h 15' 30"
2	Linda Villumsen (DEN)	Team T-Mobile Women	+1"
3	Susanne Ljungskog (SWE)	Team Flexpoint	+10"

=== Stage 4 ===
22 May 2007 – Castelnaudary to Castelnaudary, 107 km (66.5 mi)

Stage 4 result

	Rider	Team	Time
1	Marianne Vos (NED)	Team DSB Bank	3h 00' 52"
2	Judith Arndt (GER)	Team T-Mobile Women	s.t.
3	Joanne Kiesanowski (NZL)	Raleigh Lifeforce Pro Cycling Team	s.t.

General Classification after Stage 4

	Rider	Team	Time
1	Judith Arndt (GER)	Team T-Mobile Women	10h 16' 13"
2	Susanne Ljungskog (SWE)	Team Flexpoint	+18"
3	Kimberly Anderson (USA)	Team T-Mobile Women	+27"

=== Stage 5 ===
23 May 2007 – Osséja to Osséja, 110 km (68.4 mi)

Stage 5 result

	Rider	Team	Time
1	Fabiana Luperini (ITA)	Menikini-Gysko	3h 15' 12"
2	Claudia Häusler (GER)	Equipe Nürnberger Versicherung	+2' 16"
3	Maryline Salvetat (FRA)	France national team	+2' 27"

General Classification after Stage 5

	Rider	Team	Time
1	Judith Arndt (GER)	Team T-Mobile Women	13h 33' 56"
2	Susanne Ljungskog (SWE)	Team Flexpoint	+18"
3	Trixi Worrack (GER)	Equipe Nürnberger Versicherung	+43"

=== Stage 6 ===
24 May 2007 – Rieux-Minervois to Rieux-Minervois, 101 km (62.8 mi)

Stage 6 result

	Rider	Team	Time
1	Linda Villumsen (NZL)	Team T-Mobile Women	2h 42' 50"
2	Joanne Kiesanowski (NZL)	Raleigh Lifeforce Pro Cycling Team	s.t.
3	Loes Gunnewijk (NED)	Team Flexpoint	+20"

General Classification after Stage 6

	Rider	Team	Time
1	Judith Arndt (GER)	Team T-Mobile Women	16h 19' 19"
2	Susanne Ljungskog (SWE)	Team Flexpoint	+18"
3	Trixi Worrack (GER)	Equipe Nürnberger Versicherung	+43"

=== Stage 7 ===
25 May 2007 – Rennes-les-Bains to Rennes-les-Bains, 104 km (64.6 mi)

Stage 7 result

	Rider	Team	Time
1	Marianne Vos (NED)	Team DSB Bank	2h 42' 50"
2	Judith Arndt (GER)	Team T-Mobile Women	s.t.
3	Priska Doppmann (SUI)	Raleigh Lifeforce Pro Cycling Team	s.t.

General Classification after Stage 7

	Rider	Team	Time
1	Judith Arndt (GER)	Team T-Mobile Women	

=== Stage 8a ===
26 May 2007 – Quillan to Axat, 55 km (34.2 mi)

Stage 8a Result

	Rider	Team	Time
1	Judith Arndt (GER)	Team T-Mobile Women	1h 34' 59"
2	Susanne Ljungskog (SWE)	Team Flexpoint	+1"
3	Trixi Worrack (GER)	Equipe Nürnberger Versicherung	+3"

General Classification after Stage 8a

	Rider	Team	Time
1	Judith Arndt (GER)	Team T-Mobile Women	

=== Stage 8b ===
26 May 2007 – Axat to Quillan, 62 km (38.5 mi)

Stage 8a Result

	Rider	Team	Time
1	Trixi Worrack (GER)	Equipe Nürnberger Versicherung	1h 42' 10"
2	Susanne Ljungskog (SWE)	Team Flexpoint	+15"
3	Nicole Brändli (SUI)	Bigla Cycling Team	+15"

General Classification after Stage 8b

	Rider	Team	Time
1	Susanne Ljungskog (SWE)	Team Flexpoint	22h 24' 00"
2	Trixi Worrack (GER)	Equipe Nürnberger Versicherung	+11"
3	Judith Arndt (GER)	Team T-Mobile Women	+55"

=== Stage 9 ===
27 May 2007 – Limoux to Limoux, 68 km (42.3 mi)

Stage 9 result

	Rider	Team	Time
1	Ina-Yoko Teutenberg (GER)	Team T-Mobile Women	1h 48' 27"
2	Joanne Kiesanowski (NZL)	Raleigh Lifeforce Pro Cycling Team	s.t.
3	Lang Meng (CHN)	Giant Pro Cycling Team	s.t.

General Classification after Stage 9

	Rider	Team	Time
1	Susanne Ljungskog (SWE)	Team Flexpoint	24h 13' 23"
2	Trixi Worrack (GER)	Equipe Nürnberger Versicherung	+11"
3	Judith Arndt (GER)	Team T-Mobile Women	+55"

== Final classification ==
	Rider	Team	Time
1	Susanne Ljungskog (SWE)	Team Flexpoint	24h 13' 23"
2	Trixi Worrack (GER)	Equipe Nürnberger Versicherung	+11"
3	Judith Arndt (GER)	Team T-Mobile Women	+55"
4	Nicole Brändli (SUI)	Bigla Cycling Team	+1' 33"
5	Amber Neben (USA)	Team Flexpoint	+2' 30"
6	Marianne Vos (NED)	Team DSB Bank	+2' 46"
7	Priska Doppmann (SUI)	Raleigh Lifeforce Pro Cycling Team	+2' 48"
8	Joanne Kiesanowski (NZL)	Raleigh Lifeforce Pro Cycling Team	+3' 33"
9	Maryline Salvetat (FRA)	France national team	+3' 51"
10	Edita Pučinskaitė (LTU)	Equipe Nürnberger Versicherung	+4' 33"

== See also ==
- 2007 in women's road cycling
