= 2013 Chrono Champenois – Trophée Européen =

2013 in women's road cycling

Race details
- Dates: 15 September 2013
- Stages: 1
- Distance: 33.40 km (20.75 mi)
- Winning time: 43' 49"

Results
	Winner	Ellen van Dijk (NED)	(Specialized–lululemon)
	Second	Carmen Small (USA)	(Specialized–lululemon)
	Third	Shara Gillow (AUS)	(Orica–AIS)

The 2013 Chrono Champenois – Trophée Européen is the 24th running of the Chrono Champenois – Trophée Européen, a women's individual time trial bicycle race in France and was held on 15 September 2013 over a distance of 33.40 kilometres (20.8 miles). It was one of the few single time trial events on the 2013 women's cycling calendar and was the last test before the time trial at the 2013 UCI Road World Championships. It is rated by the UCI as a 1.1 category race. The time trial started and finished in Bétheny and the course went through: Bourgogne, Fresne, Pomacle, Caurel, Berru and Witry-lès-Reims.

Ellen van Dijk from the Netherlands won the time trial ahead of Specialized–lululemon teammate Carmen Small from the United States. Shara Gillow from Australia finished in third place.

== Results ==
	Cyclist	Team	Time	Behind	UCI World Ranking points
1	Ellen van Dijk (NED)	Specialized–lululemon	43' 49"	—N/a	60
2	Carmen Small (USA)	Specialized–lululemon	45' 32"	+ 1' 43"	45
3	Shara Gillow (AUS)	Orica–AIS	45' 56"	+ 2' 07"	35
4	Lisa Brennauer (GER)	Specialized–lululemon	46' 12"	+ 2' 23"	30
5	Olga Zabelinskaya (RUS)	RusVelo	46' 35"	+ 2' 46"	25
6	Alexandra Burchenkova (RUS)	RusVelo	46' 50"	+ 3' 01"	20
7	Taryn Heather (AUS)	Australia national team	46' 59"	+ 3' 10"	15
8	Marlin Rydlund (SWE)	Sweden national team	47' 21"	+ 3' 32"	10
9	Martina Ritter (AUT)	Austria national team	47' 30"	+ 3' 41"	8
10	Oksana Kozonchuk (RUS)	RusVelo	47' 35"	+ 3' 46"	6

== See also ==
- 2007 Chrono Champenois – Trophée Européen
- 2008 Chrono Champenois – Trophée Européen
- 2010 Chrono Champenois – Trophée Européen
