= Anita Valen =

Norwegian cyclist

Personal information
- Born: 12 December 1968 (age 57) Porsgrunn, Norway

Cycling career
- Sport: Cycling
- Discipline: Road
- Role: Rider
Medal record
Representing Norway
Women's road cycling
World Championships
Bronze medal – third place	2004 Verona	Road race

Anita Valen (born 12 December 1968) is a Norwegian cyclist. She won the Norwegian National Road Race Championship six times.

She was born in Porsgrunn on 12 December 1968, and is the sister of Monica Valen (formerly married Valvik).

She competed at the 2004 Summer Olympics, and again at the 2008 Summer Olympics. She won a bronze medal at the 2004 UCI Road World Championships.

She won a total of two Kongepokal trophies and 14 national titles: six road races, six time trials, and two street races.

== See also ==
- 2007 Vrienden van het Platteland season
- 2008 Team Flexpoint season
