= Trine Schmidt =

Danish cyclist (born 1988)

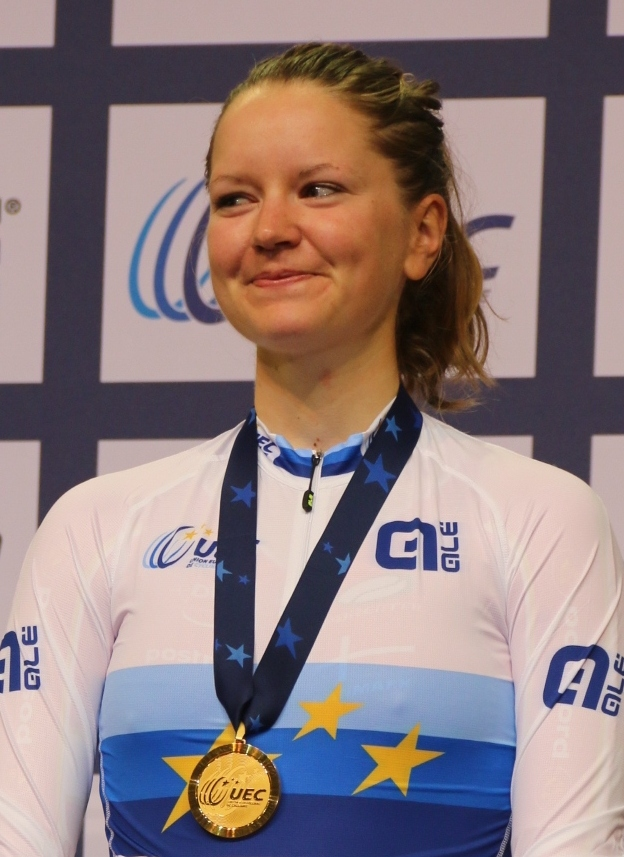
- Schmidt in 2017.

Personal information
- Full name: Trine Schmidt Hansen
- Born: 3 June 1988 (age 38) Copenhagen, Denmark

Cycling career
- Sport: Cycling
- Disciplines: Road; Track
- Role: Rider

Amateur team
- 2020: Illi-Bikes Cycling Team

Professional teams
- 2007: Team Flexpoint
- 2008–2010: Menikini–Selle Italia–Gysko
- 2010: Hitec Products UCK
- 2011: Garmin–Cervélo
- 2016: Team BMS BIRN
- 2017: Lotto–Soudal Ladies
- 2018–2019: Team Virtu Cycling
- 2021: Team Rupelcleaning–Champion Lubricants
Medal record
Representing Denmark
Women's track cycling
European Championships
Gold medal – first place	2017 Berlin	Points race
Gold medal – first place	2017 Berlin	Scratch race
World Championships
Silver medal – second place	2008 Manchester	Points race

Trine Schmidt Hansen (born 3 June 1988) is a Danish professional racing cyclist, who rode for UCI Women's Continental Team IBCT

== Major results ==
2003
National Track Championships

3rd Points race
3rd Sprint

2004
1st Scratch, National Track Championships

2005
2nd Individual pursuit, National Track Championships

2006
1st Team time trial, National Road Championships (with Mie Lacota and Anette Berg)
National Track Championships

2nd, Individual pursuit
3rd, Scratch
3rd, Sprint

2007
1st Time trial, National Road Championships
National Track Championships

1st Individual pursuit
1st Scratch
3rd Sprint

1st Overall VDO Lady Cup
1st Stage 4 Gracia–Orlová
1st CH-Transport Løbet/CK Fix
1st Sjællandsmesterskab
1st Sorø
1st Vejen

2008
2nd Points race, UCI Track World Championships
2nd Points race, 2007–08 UCI Track Cycling World Cup Classics, Copenhagen

2009
National Track Championships

1st Individual pursuit
2nd Scratch

1st Stage 5 Gran Caracol de Pista
National Road Championships

2nd Time trial
2nd Road race

2nd Chrono des Nations
5th Time trial, UEC European Under-23 Road Championships

2010
2nd Time trial, National Road Championships

2011
National Road Championships

3rd Time trial
3rd Road race

2016
National Track Championships

2nd Scratch
2nd Points race
2nd Individual pursuit
2nd Omnium

2nd Time trial, National Road Championships
3rd Individual pursuit, Milton International Challenge
2017
UEC European Championships

1st Points race
1st Scratch

National Track Championships

1st Scratch
1st Individual pursuit

Öschelbronn

1st Scratch
2nd Madison (with Amalie Winther Olsen)

1st Madison, Oberhausen (with Amalie Winther Olsen)
Dublin International

1st Scratch
2nd Omnium
2nd Points race

Prilba Moravy

2nd Scratch
3rd Omnium
2nd Madison, GP Zürich – Oerlikon (with Amalie Winther Olsen)

Zesdaagse Vlaanderen-Gent

2nd Omnium
2nd Points race
