= Chrissie Viljoen =

South African cyclist

Personal information
- Born: 11 December 1976 (age 49) South Africa

Cycling career
- Sport: Cycling
- Discipline: Road cycling

Professional team
- 2008-2010: MTN Energade Ladies Teams

Chrissie Viljoen (born 11 September 1976) is a road cyclist from South Africa. She represented her nation at the 2005, 2006 and 2008 UCI Road World Championships.
