= Chrono Champenois =

French one-day road cycling race

Race details
- Date: September
- Local name: Chrono Champenois (in French)
- Discipline: Road
- Competition: ♂ UCI Europe Tour ♀ UCI Women's Road Rankings
- Type: Single-day
- Organiser: Bétheny Sport Organisation
- Web site: www.chrono-champenois.com

History
- First edition: ♀ 1989 ♂ 1998
- Editions: ♀ 24 (as of 2013) ♂ 15 (as of 2013)
- First winner: ♀ Nathalie Six (FRA) ♂ László Bodrogi (HUN)
- Most wins: ♀ Jeannie Longo (FRA) ♀ Karin Thürig (SUI) (4 wins) ♂ Adriano Malori (ITA) (2 wins)
- Most recent: ♀ Katrin Garfoot (AUS) ♂ Daniel Westmattelmann (GER)

The Chrono Champenois is a European individual time trial bicycle race held around Bétheny in France, in the Champagne region. The race has been organised as a 1.2 event since 1989 for women's and since 1998 there is also a men's race which is part of the UCI Europe Tour. The women's race is fully called: Chrono Champenois - Trophée Européen. The 2017 event was cancelled late in the season, with the organiser planning to hold the race again in 2018.

== Winners ==
=== Men's (Chrono Champenois) ===
Year	Country	Rider	Team
1998	Hungary	László Bodrogi	VC Lyon Vaulx-en-Velin
1999	Lithuania	Linas Balčiūnas	Saint Quentin-Oktos-MBK
2000	No race		
2001	Luxembourg	Steve Fogen	Luxembourg national team
2002	Lithuania	Tomas Vaitkus	SC Zoccorinese
2003	France	Émilien-Benoît Bergès	France national team
2004	Belarus	Andrei Kunitski	Palazzago-Vellutex
2005	Netherlands	Mathieu Heijboer	Rabobank Continental Team
2006	Finland	Matti Helminen	Profel-Ziegler Continental Team
2007	Australia	Cameron Wurf	Australia national team
2008	Italy	Adriano Malori	Filmop Sorelle Ramonda Bottoli
2009	Italy	Adriano Malori	Bottoli Nordelettrica Ramonda
2010	Denmark	Rasmus Quaade	Team Designa Køkken-Blue Water
2011	Australia	Luke Durbridge	Australia national team
2012	Australia	Rohan Dennis	Team Jayco–AIS
2013	Australia	Campbell Flakemore	Australia national team
2014	Denmark	Rasmus Quaade	Denmark national team
2015	Italy	Filippo Ganna	Lampre–Merida
2016	Germany	Daniel Westmattelmann	Team Kuota–Lotto

=== Women's (Chrono Champenois - Trophée Européen) ===
Year	Country	Rider	Team
1989	France	Nathalie Six	
1990	France	Nathalie Gendron	
1991	France	Nathalie Gendron	
1992	France	Jeannie Longo	
1993	Russia	Svetlana Samokhvalova	
1994	Russia	Svetlana Samokhvalova	
1995	France	Jeannie Longo	
1996	France	Jeannie Longo	
1997	Italy	Alessandra Cappellotto	
1998	Kazakhstan	Zoulfia Zabirova	
1999	France	Jeannie Longo	
2000	No race		
2001	New Zealand	Kirsty Nicole Robb	
2002	Kazakhstan	Zoulfia Zabirova	
2003	Germany	Hanka Kupfernagel	
2004	Switzerland	Karin Thürig	
2005	Netherlands	Kathy Watt	
2006	Switzerland	Karin Thürig	
2007	Switzerland	Karin Thürig	Raleigh Lifeforce Pro Cycling Team
2008	Switzerland	Karin Thürig	Cervélo Lifeforce Pro Cycling Team
2009	Great Britain	Wendy Houvenaghel	
2010	Canada	Anne Samplonius	Canada national team
2011	Germany	Judith Arndt	HTC–Highroad Women
2012	Great Britain	Wendy Houvenaghel	Great Britain national team
2013	Netherlands	Ellen van Dijk	Specialized–lululemon
2014	Ukraine	Hanna Solovey	Ukraine national team
2015	Belgium	Ann-Sophie Duyck	Topsport Vlaanderen–Pro-Duo
2016	Australia	Katrin Garfoot	Orica–AIS
2018	United States	Leah Thomas	UnitedHealthcare
