= Martha Lopez =

Colombian cyclist

Personal information
- Full name: Martha Luz Lopez
- Born: 12 August 1968 (age 58) Colombia

Cycling career
- Sport: Cycling
- Discipline: Road cycling

Martha Luz Lopez (born 12 August 1968) is a road cyclist from Colombia. She represented her nation at the 2001 UCI Road World Championships. She won in 2001 the bronze medal in the road race at the Pan American championships.
