= Katrina Berger =

American cyclist

Personal information
- Full name: Katrina Berger-Grove
- Born: April 9, 1974 (age 52) United States

Cycling career
- Sport: Cycling
- Discipline: Road cycling

Professional teams
- 2000: Charles Schwab
- 2001: 800.COM
- 2002: Cannondale
- 2003: Team T-Mobile
- 2004: Equipe Cycliste Rona

Katrina Berger-Grove (born April 9, 1974) is a road cyclist from United States. She represented her nation at the 2001 UCI Road World Championships.
