= 2006 World University Cycling Championship – Women's road race =

Women's Road Race
2006 World University Cycling Championship

Race details
- Dates: 25 March 2006 in (Belgium) Antwerp (BEL)
- Stages: 1
- Distance: 88.4 km (54.9 mi)
- Winning time: 2h 21' 00"

Medalists
| | Gold | Ellen van Dijk (NED) | (Netherlands) |
| | Silver | Eva Lutz (GER) | (Germany) |
| | Bronze | Ludivine Henrion (BEL) | (Belgium) |

The Women's U23 road race at the 2006 World University Cycling Championship took place on 25 March 2006. The Championships were hosted by the Belgian city of Antwerp. The road race consisted of 13 laps on a 6.8 km long circuit (88.4 km). In the race participated 33 athletes from 12 countries representing 3 continents.

Two days after winning silver in the time trial, the Dutchwomen Ellen van Dijk won gold in the road race leaving the silver to Eva Lutz from Germany and the bronze to Ludivine Henrion from the host country Belgium.

== Final classification ==
| Rank | Rider | Time |
|---|---|---|
| 1st place, gold medalist(s) | Ellen van Dijk (NED) | 2h 21m 00s |
| 2nd place, silver medalist(s) | Eva Lutz (GER) | " |
| 3rd place, bronze medalist(s) | Ludivine Henrion (BEL) | " |
| 4 | Laura Bozzolo (ITA) | " |
| 5 | Andrea Edmeier (GER) | " |
| 6 | Ekaterina Malomura (RUS) | " |
| 7 | Karen Verbeek (BEL) | + 50s |
| 8 | Nathalie Lamborelle (LUX) | " |
| 9 | Mayuko Hagiwara (JPN) | " |
| 10 | Irene van den Broek (NED) | " |
| 11 | Sofie De Vuyst (BEL) | " |
| 12 | Grace Verbeke (BEL) | " |
| 13 | Rebecca Bertolo (ITA) | " |
| 14 | Jana Kyptova (CZE) | " |
| 15 | Betty Kinn (LUX) | " |
| 16 | Claudia Häusler (GER) | " |
| 17 | Anita Kenyo (HUN) | " |
| 18 | Mónika Király (HUN) | " |
| 19 | Emilia Szymanska (POL) | " |
| 20 | Anna Miyazaki (JPN) | " |
| 21 | Christine Kolveter (LUX) | " |
| 22 | Emanuela Azzini (ITA) | " |
| 23 | Tina Liebig (GER) | " |
| 24 | Tina Oosthuysen (ZAF) | " |
| 25 | Isabelle Hoffmann (LUX) | " |
| 26 | Alma Koelemeier (NED) | " |
| 27 | Mary Brennan (IRL) | " |
| 28 | Petronella Hattingh (ZAF) | " |
| 29 | Katarina Bohata (CZE) | " |
| 30 | Ilena Lazzaro (ITA) | + 1m 02s |
| 31 | Sharon van Essen (NED) | + 1m 04s |

== See also ==
- 2006 World University Cycling Championship – Women's time trial
