= Bertine Spijkerman =

Dutch cyclist

Personal information
- Born: 31 May 1982 (age 44) Sneek

Cycling career
- Sport: Cycling
- Discipline: Road cycling

Professional teams
- 2001: Farm Frites - Hartol
- 2004-2005: @Home Cycling Team
- 2006-2007: Therme Skin Care
- 2008: Restore Cycling Ladies
- 2009: DSB Bank-Nederland Bloeit

Bertine Spijkerman (born 31 May 1982) is a road cyclist from Netherlands. She won the bronze medal at the 2000 UCI Road World Championships in the women's junior time trial.
