= Lise Christensen =

Danish cyclist

Personal information
- Born: Denmark

Cycling career
- Sport: Cycling
- Discipline: Road cycling

Lise Christensen is a road cyclist from Denmark. She represented her nation at the 2004, 2005 and 2006 UCI Road World Championships.
