= Tang Kerong =

Chinese cyclist

Personal information
- Born: 7 May 1988 (age 38) China

Cycling career
- Sport: Cycling
- Discipline: Road cycling

Professional teams
- 2000–2001: Rabobank Women's Cycling Team
- 2011–2012: China Chongming – Giant Pro Cycling

Tang Kerong (born 7 May 1988) is a road cyclist from China. At the 2009 Asian Cycling Championships she won the time trial and road race.
