= Team PCW =

Russian professional cycling team

Team information
- UCI code: FEN (2004–2010); PCW (2011)
- Registered: Italy (2004–2009); Russia (2010–2011)
- Founded: 2004
- Disbanded: 2011
- Discipline: Road
- Status: UCI Women's Team (2004–2010); National (2011)

Team name history
- 2004 2005 2006 2007 2008–2009 2010 2011: P.M.B. Fenixs–T2; P.M.B. Fenixs; Fenixs–Colnago; Fenixs–HPB; Fenixs; Fenixs–Petrogradets; Team PCW

Team PCW (UCI team code: PCW) was a Russian professional cycling team, which competed in elite road bicycle racing events such as the UCI Women's Road World Cup. For the 2010 season, the team merged with Petrogradets.

== Major wins ==
2005
Stage 3 Giro della Toscana Int. Femminile, Svetlana Bubnenkova
Stages 2, 3, 4 & 5 Tour Cycliste Féminin Ardèche, Svetlana Bubnenkova
Stage 8 Giro d'Italia Femminile, Svetlana Bubnenkova
Overall Giro del Trentino Alto Adige-Südtirol, Svetlana Bubnenkova

Stage 2, Svetlana Bubnenkova

Overall Emakumeen Bira, Svetlana Bubnenkova

Stage 1, Svetlana Bubnenkova

Stage 7 Tour de l'Aude, Yuliya Martisova

2006
Overall Giro della Toscana Int. Femminile, Svetlana Bubnenkova

Stage 5, Svetlana Bubnenkova

Stage 8 La Route de France Féminine, Svetlana Bubnenkova
Stages 3, 4 & 6 Giro d'Italia Femminile, Olga Slyusareva
Overall Giro del Trentino Alto Adige-Südtirol, Svetlana Bubnenkova

Stages 1 & 2, Svetlana Bubnenkova

Overall Giro di San Marino, Svetlana Bubnenkova

Stage 2, Svetlana Bubnenkova

Stage 7 Tour de l'Aude Cycliste Féminin, Olga Zabelinskaya

2007
Criterium des Championnes, Natalia Boyarskaya

2008
Overall Tour Féminin en Limousin, Natalia Boyarskaya

Stage 3, Natalia Boyarskaya

Stage 2 Tour de Bretagne, Joanne Kiesanowski
Grand Prix Elsy Jacobs, Monia Baccaille

2009
Overall Vuelta Femenina a Costa Rica, Evelyn García

Stages 1, 2 (ITT) & 5

Grand Prix Elsy Jacobs, Svetlana Bubnenkova

2011
Stage 4 Tour de Bretagne Féminin, Anna Potokina
Prologue Gracia–Orlová, Svetlana Bubnenkova
Stage 1 Gracia–Orlová, Natalia Boyarskaya

== National & Continental Champions ==
2005
Russia Time Trial, Svetlana Bubnenkova
Russia Road Race, Yuliya Martisova

2007
Russia Time Trial, Tatiana Antoshina
Russia Road Race, Natalia Boyarskaya
Luxembourg Road Race, Suzie Godart

2008
Ireland Road Race, Siobhan Horgan

2009
El Salvador Road Race, Evelyn García
El Salvador Time Trial, Evelyn García

2010
European U23 Time Trial, Alexandra Burchenkova
