= 2006 World University Cycling Championship – Women's time trial =

Women's Individual Time Trial
2006 World University Cycling Championship

Race details
- Dates: 23 March 2006 in (Belgium) Antwerp (BEL)
- Stages: 1
- Distance: 13.6 km (8.5 mi)
- Winning time: 18' 11.66"

Medalists
	Gold	Loes Gunnewijk (NED)	(Netherlands)
	Silver	Ellen van Dijk (NED)	(Netherlands)
	Bronze	Verena Jooss (GER)	(Germany)

The Women's U23 road race at the 2006 World University Cycling Championship took place on 23 March 2006. The Championships were hosted by the Belgian city of Antwerp. The race consisted of 2 laps on a 6.8 km long circuit (13.4 km). In the race participated 23 athletes from 13 countries representing 3 continents.

The Dutch women's Loes Gunnewijk and Ellen van Dijk won gold and silver in the time trial leaving the silver to Verena Jooss from Germany.

== Final classification ==
Rank	Rider	Time
1st place, gold medalist(s)	Loes Gunnewijk (NED)	18:11.66
2nd place, silver medalist(s)	Ellen van Dijk (NED)	18:40.16
3rd place, bronze medalist(s)	Verena Jooss (GER)	18:55.28
4	Laura Bozzolo (ITA)	19:00.14
5	Grace Verbeke (BEL)	19:29.39
6	Jana Kyptova (CZE)	19:44.22
7	Tina Liebig (GER)	19:56.52
8	Rebecca Bertolo (ITA)	19:57.71
9	Samantha Oosthuysen (RSA)	20:03.44
10	Mayuko Hagiwara (JPN)	20:10.66
11	Isabelle Hoffmann (LUX)	20:16.50
12	Sjoukje Dufour (BEL)	20:22.33
13	Anna Miyazaki (JPN)	20:45.96
14	Katarina Bohata (CZE)	20:46.04
15	Ekaterina Malomura (RUS)	20:52.61
16	Mónika Király (HUN)	21:14.46
17	Mary Brennan (IRL)	21:18.38
18	Elina Kivioja (FIN)	21:23.0
19	Anita Kenyo (HUN)	21:31.08
20	Emilia Szymanska (POL)	21:44.46
21	Betty Kinn (LUX)	21:48.94
22	Petronella Hattingh (RSA)	22:16.55
DNF	Nadezda Vlasova (RUS)	

DNF = did not finish

== See also ==
- 2006 World University Cycling Championship – Women's road race
