= Sharon van Essen =

Dutch cyclist (born 1981)

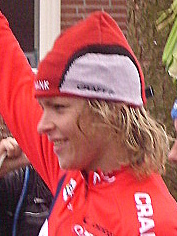
- Sharon van Essen (Cyclist)

Personal information
- Full name: Sharon van Essen
- Born: 3 March 1981 (age 45) Utrecht, the Netherlands

Cycling career
- Sport: Cycling
- Current team: Retired
- Discipline: Road
- Role: Rider

Amateur team
- 2009: Team Ton van Bemmelen Sports

Professional teams
- 2000–2001: Farm Frites-Hartol
- 2004: Ondernemers van Nature-Vrienden van het Platteland
- 2005–2006: Vrienden van het Platteland
- 2007–2008: DSB Bank Ladies Cycling-Team

Sharon van Essen (born 3 March 1981) is a former Dutch cyclist from Utrecht, the Netherlands. She turned professional in 2000 with the Farm Frites-Hartol team.

== Palmarès ==
2001
1st Sparkassen Giro Bochum

2005
2nd Dutch National Road Race Championships

2006 (Vrienden van het Platteland)
31st World University Cycling Championship, road race

2nd Dutch National Road Race Championships
