= Zhao Na (cyclist) =

Chinese cyclist

Personal information
- Born: 29 April 1984 (age 42) China

Cycling career
- Sport: Cycling
- Discipline: Road cycling

Professional team
- 2010–2013: China Chongming–Giant Pro Cycling

Zhao Na (Chinese: 赵娜; pinyin: Zhao Na, born 29 April 1984) is a road cyclist from China. She represented her nation at the 2006 UCI Road World Championships.
