= Wang Li (cyclist) =

Chinese cyclist

Personal information
- Full name: 王 莉, Pinyin: Wáng Lì
- Born: 4 December 1962 (age 63)

Cycling career
- Sport: Cycling

Wang Li (born 4 December 1962) is a Chinese former cyclist. She competed in the women's road race event at the 1984 Summer Olympics and 1986 Asian Games.
