= Li Meifang =

Chinese cyclist (born 1978)

Personal information
- Born: 20 August 1978 (age 48) China

Cycling career
- Sport: Cycling
- Discipline: Road cycling

Professional team
- 2008–2009: Giant Pro Cycling

Li Meifang (born 20 August 1978) is a former road cyclist from China. She represented her nation at the 2003, 2006 and 2007 UCI Road World Championships. She also competed in the women's points race at the 2004 Summer Olympics.

== Major results ==
2007
10th UCI Road World Championships – Women's time trial
