= Loes Markerink =

Dutch cyclist (born 1985)

Personal information
- Born: 14 December 1985 (age 40) Delfzijl, Netherlands

Cycling career
- Sport: Cycling
- Discipline: Road cycling

Professional teams
- 2004–2006: @Work Cycling Team
- 2007–2009: Team Flexpoint
- 2010: Nederland Bloeit
Medal record
Women's road cycling
Representing Netherlands
World University Cycling Championship
Bronze medal – third place	2008 Nijmegen	Time trial

Loes Markerink (born 14 December 1985 in Delfzijl) is a road cyclist from the Netherlands. She won at the 2003 UCI Road World Championships the junior women's road race and finished second in the women's junior time trial. As a senior, she has won a stage in several stage races: Tour de Bretagne, Damesronde van Drenthe, Grande Boucle Féminine Internationale, Holland Ladies Tour and Gracia–Orlová.

== Major results ==
2008
6th Omloop Het Volk

== See also ==
- 2008 Team Flexpoint season
