= @Work Cycling Team =

Netherlands women's cycling team

Team information
- UCI code: HCT
- Registered: Netherlands
- Founded: 2004
- Disbanded: 2006
- Discipline: Road
- Status: UCI Women's Team

Team name history
- 2004–2005 2006: @Home Cycling Team @Work Cycling Team

@Work Cycling Team (UCI team code: HCT) was a Dutch professional cycling team, which competed in elite road bicycle racing events such as the UCI Women's Road World Cup.

== Major wins ==
2004
Stage 3 Novilon Internationale Damesronde van Drenthe, Bertine Spijkerman

2005
Stage 4 Trophée d'Or Féminin, Bertine Spijkerman
Stage 4 Tour Féminin de Bretagne, Bertine Spijkerman

2006
Stage Tour de Bretagne Féminin, Andrea Bosman
Overall Novilon Internationale Damesronde van Drenthe, Loe Markerink

Stage 2, Loe Markerink
