= Vrienden van het Platteland =

Team information
- UCI code: OND (2002–2004); VVP (2005–2008)
- Registered: Netherlands
- Founded: 2000
- Disbanded: 2008
- Discipline: Road

Key personnel
- General manager: Peter Smeets
- Team managers: Jan van Dam (2007); Wim Kruis (2008)

Team name history
- 2000–2003 2004 2005–2008: Ondernemers van Nature; Ondernemers van Nature-Vrienden van het Platteland; Vrienden van het Platteland
Vrienden van het Platteland jersey
Jersey

Vrienden van het Platteland (UCI Code: VVP) was a Dutch UCI women's road cycling team that existed in the 2000–2008 road cycling seasons.

== History ==
=== 2006 ===
One of the main new recruits for the team was former junior rider Ellen van Dijk. In March Ellen van Dijk became University World Champion at the 2006 World University Cycling Championship in the women's road race. and finished second in the women's time trial. The other main victories for the team were Flèche Hesbignonne by Chantal Beltman and stage 2 of the Tour Féminin en Limousin by Ellen van Dijk. At the national championships Sharon van Essen finished second in the road race and Iris Slappendel won the bronze medal in the women's time trial. At the end of the year the team ended 12th in the UCI Team's Ranking with Chantal Beltman as the best individual at the 30th place in the UCI Individual Women's Road Ranking. Van Dijk was also active on the track and won the bronze medal at the 2006 Dutch National Track Championships in the women's individual pursuit.

=== 2007 ===
The main victories on the road for the team were the time trial at the Tour of Chongming Island by Ellen van Dijk and the Norwegian and Dutch Time Trial Championships by Anita Valen and Ellen van Dijk. On the track Van Dijk also won the individual pursuit at the Dutch National Track Cycling Championships. At the end of the year the team ended 23rd in the UCI Team's Ranking with Ellen van Dijk as the best individual at the 37th place in the UCI Individual Women's Road Ranking.

The first podium place for the team was a third place for Jaccolien Wallaard at Omloop Het Volk in March. In May Ellen van Dijk finished third at Omloop van Borsele and in the time trial stage at the Tour de l'Aude Cycliste Féminin. Van Dijk finished third again in an international time trial at the Tour of Chongming Island Time trial in June. The day afterwards Van Dijk won the first stage of the Tour of Chongming Island with Wallaard in third place. After finishing second in the stage 2 and stage 3 Van Dijk ended also second in the general classification. In July Ellen van Dijk represented the Netherlands at the European Championships (under-23) and finished fifth in the time trial. At the national championships Anita Valen won the time trial in Norway and finished second in the road race. In the Netherlands Ellen van Dijk won the Dutch time trial championships. Due to Van Dijks' good results in the time trials she was chosen to represent the Netherlands in the time trial at the World Championships in Stuttgart where she finished 17th. Due to her good results Ellen van Dijk became sportswomen of the year of Woerden. Van Dijk was invited to join the Dutch national track cycling team. At the national track championships she became Dutch champion in the individual pursuit, ahead of Marianne Vos and Kirsten Wild, and finished fourth in the scratch race and points race.

=== 2008 ===
Ellen van Dijk became European Champion in the time trial and won the stage 2 of the 2008 Tour de l'Aude Cycliste Féminin and the prologue of 2008 Tour Féminin en Limousin. An Van Rie won the Belgian Time Trial Championships. However, the largest victories were on the track. Ellen van Dijk became World Champion in the scratch and European champion in the Women's points race and Women's scratch. At the European championships she also won two silver medals. Willy Kanis won 4 times an individual event at the Track Cycling World Cups in 2008 and together with Yvonne Hijgenaar two times the team sprint event. The team finished 19th in the 2008 UCI Team Ranking.

== Roster ==
During the years the team had mainly Dutch riders, including:
(Netherlands) Ellen van Dijk (2006–2008)
(Netherlands) Sharon van Essen (2004–2006)
(Netherlands) Loes Gunnewijk (2004–2005)
(Netherlands) Chantal Beltman (2004–2006)
(Netherlands) Yvonne Hijgenaar (2008)
(Netherlands) Willy Kanis (2008)
(Netherlands) Roxane Knetemann (2008)
(Netherlands) Vera Koedooder (2004)
(Netherlands) Iris Slappendel (2004–2006)
(Netherlands) Annemiek van Vleuten (2008)

During the last two year the team had also riders from other countries, including:
(Australia) Katie Brown (2007)
(Norway) Anita Valen (2007)
(Belgium) Liesbet De Vocht (2008)
(United States) Tina Pic (2008)
(Belgium) An Van Rie (2008)

=== 2008 squad ===
Ages as of 1 January 2008.

Rider	Date of birth
Liesbeth Bakker (NED)	July 1, 1986 (aged 21)
Martine Bras (NED)	May 17, 1987 (aged 20)
Nikki Butterfield-Egyed (AUS)	April 12, 1982 (aged 25)
Ellen van Dijk (NED)	February 11, 1987 (aged 20)
Lorian Graham (AUS)	November 8, 1977 (aged 30)
Yvonne Hijgenaar (NED)	May 15, 1980 (aged 27)
Marit Huisman (NED)	March 1, 1989 (aged 18)
Willy Kanis (NED)	July 27, 1984 (aged 23)
Roxane Knetemann (NED)	April 1, 1987 (aged 20)

Rider	Date of birth
Kristy Miggels (NED)	August 6, 1980 (aged 27)
Tina Pic (USA)	May 9, 1966 (aged 41)
Martine van der Herberg (NED)	November 24, 1989 (aged 18)
An Van Rie (BEL)	June 9, 1974 (aged 33)
Annemiek van Vleuten (NED)	October 8, 1982 (aged 25)
Monique Verstraten (NED)	April 24, 1983 (aged 24)
Liesbet De Vocht (BEL)	January 5, 1979 (aged 28)
Jaccolien Wallaard (NED)	September 30, 1982 (aged 25)

Guest riders

The team had Felicia Gomez and Linn Torp as guest riders during the Tour of New Zealand and Gomez also during the Geelong Tour.

== Victories ==
2000
1st Zeddam Cyclo-cross, Danielle Jansen
1st Luyksgestel Criterium, Sonja Van Kuik-Pfister
1st Kortenhoef Derny, Edith Klep-Moerenhout
1st Dordrecht Criterium, Francis Linthorst
1st Nijmegen Criterium, Janneke Vos
2001
1st Luyksgestel Criterium, Tanja Schmidt-Hennes
1st Zoetermeer Criterium, Areke Hassink
2002
1st Haarsteeg Criterium, Martine Bras
1st Omloop van Borsele, Loes Gunnewijk
1st Commonwealth Games Track Championships (Points race), Kate Bates
1st Memorial Marc Van Beek, Kate Bates
1st Haasdonk Criterium, Kate Bates
2004
1st Omloop van Borsele, Chantal Beltman
1st Overall RaboSter Zeeuwsche Eilanden, Chantal Beltman

1st Stage 3a, Loes Gunnewijk

1st Zoeterwoude Criterium, Iris Slappendel
1st Steenwijk Criterium, Andrea Bosman
1st Gouden Pijl, Chantal Beltman
1st Wielerronde van Nispen, Andrea Bosman
1st Overall Boekel, Loes Gunnewijk

1st Stage 3, Loes Gunnewijk

1st Berkelse Wielerdag, Chantal Beltman
1st Vorden, Cyclo-cross (F): Loes Gunnewijk
1st Stage 1 Tour de Feminin, Chantal Beltman
1st Stage 5 Tour de l'Aude, Chantal Beltman
2005
1st Veldhoven, Kristy Miggels
1st Rijssen, Chantal Beltman
1st Stage 2 RaboSter Zeeuwsche Eilanden, Chantal Beltman
1st Kieldrecht, Andrea Bosman
1st Boxtel Cyclo-cross, Loes Gunnewijk
1st Herford Cyclo-cross, Loes Gunnewijk
1st Stage 4 Tour de l'Aude, Loes Gunnewijk
1st Stage 3 Novilon Internationale Damesronde van Drenthe, Kristy Miggels
2006
1st World University Road Race Championship, Ellen van Dijk
1st Fleurus, Moniek Rotmensen
1st Amerika, Iris Slappendel
1st Cras-Avernas, Chantal Beltman
1st Oosterbeek, Chantal Beltman
1st Stage 2 Tour Féminin en Limousin, Ellen van Dijk
1st Profronde van Stiphout, Moniek Rotmensen
1st Bochum, Iris Slappendel
1st Stage 2 Boekel, Ellen van Dijk
1st Stage 1 TTT Giro della Toscana Int. Femminile, Iris Slappendel, Chantal Beltman & Ellen van Dijk
1st Netherlands National University Road Race Championship, Ellen van Dijk
1st Flèche Hesbignonne, Chantal Beltman
2007
1st Breezand, Monique van de Ree
1st Bleiswijk, Ellen van Dijk
1st Oudenbosch, Monique van de Ree
1st Stage 1 Tour of Chongming Island, Ellen van Dijk
1st Norway National Time Trial Championships, Anita Valen
1st Alblasserdam, Ellen van Dijk
1st Profronde van Stiphout, Ellen van Dijk
1st Maarheeze, Jaccolien Wallaard
1st Netherlands National Time Trial Championships, Ellen van Dijk
1st Stage 2 Boekel, Ellen van Dijk
1st Netherlands National Track Championships (Individual pursuit), Ellen van Dijk
2008
1st Los Angeles (UCI Track World Cup) Team Sprint, Yvonne Hijgenaar & Willy Kanis
1st København (UCI Track World Cup) Sprint, Willy Kanis
1st København (UCI Track World Cup) Keirin, Willy Kanis
1st World Track Championships (Scratch race), Ellen van Dijk
1st Beaufort, Tina Pic
1st Anniston, Tina Pic
1st Stages 2 & 6 Mount Hood Classic, Tina Pic
1st Districtskampioenschap Midden-Nederland, Road, ITT, Elite, The Netherlands (F): Annemiek van Vleuten
1st Stage 2 TTT Tour de l'Aude Cycliste Féminin, Ellen van Dijk & Martine Bras
1st Somerville, Tina Pic
1st Stage 2 Nature Valley Grand Prix, Tina Pic
1st Tielt-Winge, Liesbet De Vocht
1st European Championship, Road, ITT, U23 Ellen van Dijk
1st Stage 4 Fitchburg Longsjo Classic, Tina Pic
1st Geel, Martine Bras
1st Stage 1 Tour Féminin en Limousin, Ellen van Dijk
1st Belgium National Time Trial Championship, An Van Rie
1st De Klinge, Liesbet De Vocht
1st Binghamton, Tina Pic
1st European U23 Track Championship (Points race), Ellen van Dijk
1st Priority Health Grand Cycling Challenge, Tina Pic
1st Ann Arbor, Tina Pic
1st European U23 Track Championships (Scatch race), Ellen van Dijk
1st European Track Championships (Omnium) Yvonne Hijgenaar
1st Melbourne (UCI Track World Cup) Team Sprint, Yvonne Hijgenaar & Willy Kanis
1st Melbourne (UCI Track World Cup) 500 m, Willy Kanis
1st Melbourne (UCI Track World Cup) Keirin, Willy Kanis
1st Netherlands National Track Championships (500 m), Willy Kanis
1st Netherlands National Track Championships (Sprint), Willy Kanis
1st Netherlands National Track Championships (Pursuit), Ellen van Dijk
1st Netherlands National Track Championships (Keirin), Willy Kanis
