= Team Flexpoint =

Dutch cycling team (2005–2009)

Team information
- UCI code: BFL (2005–2008); FLX (2009)
- Registered: Netherlands
- Founded: 2005
- Disbanded: 2009
- Discipline: Road
- Status: UCI Women's Team

Key personnel
- General manager: Jean-Paul van Poppel

Team name history
- 2005–2006 2007–2009: Buitenpoort–Flexpoint Team; Flexpoint

Team Flexpoint (UCI Code: FLX) was a women's professional cycling team based in Netherlands, sponsored by Flexpoint. The team consisted of two sections: UCI Women's Tour and cyclo-cross.

== Results ==
2005
Hoogerheide Cyclo-cross, Mirjam Melchers-van Poppel
Stage 3 Tour of New Zealand, Susanne Ljungskog
Ronde van Vlaanderen, Mirjam Melchers-van Poppel
Stage 3 Gracia-Orlová, Susanne Ljungskog
Lekkerkerk, Mirjam Melchers-van Poppel
GP Castilla y León, Susanne Ljungskog
Flevotour, Vera Koedooder
Overall Tour de l'Aude Cycliste Féminin, Amber Neben

Stage 3b, Amber Neben

Stage 1Eko Tour Dookola Polski, Tanja Schmidt-Hennes
Emakumen Saria, Mirjam Melchers-van Poppel
Stage 2 Emakumeen Euskal Bira, Susanne Ljungskog
Overall RaboSter Zeeuwsche Eilanden, Mirjam Melchers-van Poppel

Stage 3, Mirjam Melchers-van Poppel

Stage 5 Giro d'Italia Donne, Mirjam Melchers-van Poppel
Waasmunster, Sandra Rombouts
Boxmeer, Mirjam Melchers-van Poppel
Alblasserdam, Linda Melanie Villumsen
Roosendaal, Mirjam Melchers-van Poppel
Oostvoorne, Mirjam Melchers-van Poppel
Skara, Susanne Ljungskog
Stage 4b (TTT), Tanja Schmidt-Hennes, Luise Keller, Sandra Rombouts, Susanne Ljungskog, Mirjam Melchers-van Poppel, Linda Melanie Villumsen
Overall Holland Ladies Tour, Tanja Schmidt-Hennes

Stage 6, Susanne Ljungskog

Overall Giro della Toscana Int. Femminile, Susanne Ljungskog
Prologue, Mirjam Melchers-van Poppel
Stage 4, Susanne Ljungskog
Amersfoort, Cyclo-cross, Mirjam Melchers-van Poppel
2006
Overall Redlands Bicycle Classic, Amber Neben
Stages 1 & 3, Amber Neben
Oploo, Vera Koedooder
Ronde van Vlaanderen, Mirjam Melchers-van Poppel
Veldhoven, Linda Melanie Villumsen
Overall Tour de l'Aude Cycliste Féminin, Amber Neben

Stage 1 (TTT), Amber Neben, Madeleine Sandig, Mirjam Melchers-van Poppel, Loes Gunnewijk, Sandra Rombouts, Susanne Ljungskog
Stage 3, Loes Gunnewijk
Stage 9, Susanne Ljungskog

Rijsoord, Vera Koedooder
Emakumen Saria, Susanne Ljungskog
Stage 3b Emakumeen Euskal Bira, Susanne Ljungskog
Arnhem, Sandra Rombouts
Stage 1 RaboSter Zeeuwsche Eilanden, Linda Melanie Villumsen
Kaatsheuvel, Vera Koedooder
Stage 7 Giro d'Italia Donne, Susanne Ljungskog
Arendonk, Sandra Rombouts
Vårgårda, Susanne Ljungskog
Overall Route de France Féminine, Linda Melanie Villumsen

Stage 4b (TTT) Loes Gunnewijk, Linda Melanie Villumsen, Amber Neben, Susanne Ljungskog

Brasschaat, Vera Koedooder
Overall Holland Ladies Tour, Susanne Ljungskog
Stage 2 Euregio Ladies Tour, Loes Gunnewijk
Dordrecht, Cyclo-cross, Loes Gunnewijk
Sydney, Scratch race, Vera Koedooder
Vorden, Cyclo-cross, Loes Gunnewijk
2007
Oud-Vossemeer, Iris Slappendel
Omloop Het Nieuwsblad, Mie Bekker Lacota
Overall Redlands Bicycle Classic, Amber Neben

Prologue, Amber Neben

Svendborg, Mie Bekker Lacota
Stage 4 Gracia-Orlová, Trine Schmidt
Stage 5 Gracia-Orlová, Loes Markerink
Heerenveen, Derny, Loes Markerink
Overall Tour de l'Aude Cycliste Féminin, Susanne Ljungskog
CH-Transport Løbet/CK Fix, Trine Schmidt
Sjællandsmesterskab ITT, Trine Schmidt
Stage 1 Emakumeen Euskal Bira (TTT), Loes Gunnewijk, Susanne Ljungskog, Mirjam Melchers-van Poppel, Susanne Ljungskog
Oosterbeek, Mirjam Melchers-van Poppel
Stage 6 Thüringen-Rundfahrt der Frauen, Susanne Ljungskog
Maastricht, Omnium (F): Mirjam Melchers-van Poppel
General classification Route de France Féminine, Amber Neben

Stage 4b, Amber Neben

Pijnacker, Mirjam Melchers-van Poppel
Sorø, Trine Schmidt
Vejen, Trine Schmidt
Chrono des Herbiers, Susanne Ljungskog
Amersfoort, Cyclo-cross, Mirjam Melchers-van Poppel
2008
Surhuisterveen, Cyclo-cross, Saskia Elemans
Wieze, Loes Markerink
Roeselare, Loes Markerink
Veldhoven, Iris Slappendel
Districtskampioenschap Oost-Nederland, Loes Markerink
Stage 2 Tour de l'Aude Cycliste Féminin, Loes Gunnewijk, Mirjam Melchers-van Poppel
Stage 6 Vuelta Ciclista Femenina a el Salvador, Anita Valen de Vries
7-Dorpenomloop Aalburg, Loes Markerink
Stage 2a Grande Boucle Féminine Internationale, Loes Markerink
La Mirada, Amber Neben
Prologue Giro d'Italia Donne, Mirjam Melchers-van Poppel
Ochten, Iris Slappendel
Alblasserdam, Loes Markerink
Barendrecht, Iris Slappendel
Emmen, Loes Gunnewijk
Stage 5 Holland Ladies Tour, Loes Markerink
Hilversum, Suzanne van Veen
Overall Tour de l'Ardèche, Amber Neben

Stage 6, Susanne Ljungskog

Harderwijk, Cyclo-cross, Saskia Elemans
Nieuwkuijk, Cyclo-cross, Saskia Elemans
Chrono des Herbiers, Susanne Ljungskog
Moergestel, Cyclo-cross, Saskia Elemans
Amersfoort, Cyclo-cross, Mirjam Melchers-van Poppel
Vorden, Cyclo-cross, Loes Gunnewijk
2009
Sint Michielsgestel, Cyclo-cross, Mirjam Melchers-van Poppel
Surhuisterveen, Cyclo-cross, Saskia Elemans
Oud-Vossemeer, Iris Slappendel
Luttenberg, Loes Gunnewijk
Districtskampioenschap Oost-Nederland, Loes Gunnewijk
1stStage 5 Gran Caracol de Pista, Trine Schmidt

== National, continental and world champions ==
2005
Sweden National Road Race Championship, Susanne Ljungskog
2006
World Universiade Time Trial Championship, Loes Gunnewijk
Pan American Time Trial Championships, Amber Neben
National Time Trial Championship, Loes Gunnewijk
Denmark National Time Trial Championship, Linda Melanie Villumsen
Sweden National Time Trial Championship, Susanne Ljungskog
Sweden National Road Race Championship, Susanne Ljungskog
Denmark National Road Race Championship, Linda Melanie Villumsen
National Road Race Championship, Annette Beutler
European U23 Time Trial Championship, Linda Melanie Villumsen
National Track Championship (Points), Madeleine Sandig
National Mountainbike Championship (Marathon), Elsbeth Van Rooy-Vink
National Track Championship (Individual Pursuit), Vera Koedooder
2007
Denmark National Time Trial Championship, Trine Schmidt
National Road Race Championship, Luise Keller
Denmark National Track Championship (Scratch), Trine Schmidt
Denmark National Track Championship (Individual Pursuit), Trine Schmidt
Denmark National Track Championship (Individual Sprint), Mie Bekker Lacota
2008
National Cyclo-cross Championship, Mirjam Melchers-van Poppel
World Universiade Time Trial Championship, Iris Slappendel
World Universiade Road Race Championship, Elise Van Hage
National Time Trial Championship, Anita Valen de Vries
National Road Race Championship, Anita Valen de Vries
National Time Trial Championship, Mirjam Melchers-van Poppel
World Time Trial Championship, Amber Neben
2009
National Cyclo-cross Championship (Juniors), Tessa van Nieuwpoort
Denmark National Track Championship (Individual Pursuit), Trine Schmidt

== Team roster 2007 ==
=== Team roster UCI Women's Team 2007 ===
- Mirjam Melchers (Ned)
- Susanne Ljungskog (Swe)
- Amber Neben (USA)
- Loes Gunnewijk (Ned)
- Mie Lacota (Den)
- Luise Keller (Ger)
- Moniek Kleinsman (Ned)
- Loes Markerink (Ned)
- Madeleine Sandig (Ger)
- Trine Schmidt (Den)
- Iris Slappendel (Ned)
- Susanne van Veen (Ned)

=== Team roster Cyclo-Cross Team 2007/2008 ===
- Britt Jochems (Ned)
- Loes Gunnewijk (Ned)
- Loes Markerink (Ned)
- Mirjam Melchers (Ned)
- Tessa van Nieuwpoort (Ned)

== Management ==
Jean-Paul van Poppel, Klas Johansson, Geert Broekhuizen
