= 2007 UCI Women's Road World Rankings =

The 2007 UCI Women's Road Rankings is an overview of the UCI Women's Road Rankings, based upon the results in all UCI-sanctioned races of the 2007 women's road cycling season.

== Summary ==
Final result.

Top-ranked individual	Second-ranked individual	Third-ranked individual	Top-ranked team	Top-ranked nation
Marianne Vos (NED); Team DSB Bank	Nicole Cooke (GBR); Raleigh Lifeforce Creation HB Pro Cycling Team	Judith Arndt (GER); T-Mobile Women	T-Mobile Women	Germany

== Individual World Ranking (top 100) ==
Final result.

	Cyclists	Nation	Team	Age	Points
1	Marianne Vos	NED	DSB	26	1327.66
2	Nicole Cooke	GBR	RLT	30	750
3	Judith Arndt	GER	TMP	37	712.83
4	Noemi Cantele	ITA	BCT	32	629.16
5	Giorgia Bronzini	ITA	SAF	30	557
6	Edita Pučinskaitė	LTU	NUR	38	554.75
7	Susanne Ljungskog	SWE	FLX	37	553.49
8	Oenone Wood	AUS	TMP	33	518.5
9	Amber Neben	USA	FLX	38	477.16
10	Ina Teutenberg	GER	TMP	39	431
11	Trixi Worrack	GER	NUR	32	421.75
12	Marta Bastianelli	ITA	SAF	26	402
13	Fabiana Luperini	ITA	MSG	39	379
14	Hanka Kupfernagel	GER		39	343.66
15	Rochelle Gilmore	AUS	MSG	32	334
16	Karin Thürig	SUI	RLT	41	332
17	Marina Jaunâtre	FRA	FUT	31	322
18	Kristin Armstrong	USA	LIP	40	320
19	Nicole Brändli	SUI	BCT	34	303.49
20	Regina Schleicher	GER	NUR	39	302.25
21	Joanne Kiesanowski	NZL	RLT	34	258.66
22	Emma Pooley	GBR	TSW	31	246
23	Andrea Graus	AUT	NUR	34	233.75
24	Kirsten Wild	NED	AAD	31	220.25
25	Emma Johansson	SWE	VLL	30	205
26	Chantal Beltman	NED	TMP	37	201
27	Priska Doppmann	SUI	RLT	42	197.66
28	Christiane Soeder	AUT	RLT	38	191.66
29	Angela Brodtka	GER	TGH	32	176.83
30	Martina Corazza	ITA	FRW	34	174
31	Maribel Moreno Allue	ESP	CVA	32	172
32	Maryline Salvtat	FRA		39	166
33	Diana Žiliūtė	LTU	SAF	37	151
34	Tina Mayolo Pic	USA	COL	47	149
35	Suzanne de Goede	NED	TMP	29	147
36	Grete Treier	EST	MIC	36	146
37	Ellen van Dijk	NED	VVP	26	145
38	Mirjam Melchers-Van Poppel	NED	FLX	38	139.33
39	Mara Abbott	USA		28	134
40	Natalia Boyarskaya	RUS	FEN	30	133
41	Claudia Häusler	GER	NUR	28	127.5
42	Evelyn García	ESA	DGC	31	124
43	Monia Baccaille	ITA	SEM	29	117
44	Edwige Pitel	FRA	UNG	46	116
45	Zulfiya Zabirova	KAZ	BCT	40	112.33
46	Meng Lang	CHN	GPC	29	108
47	Adrie Visser	NED	DSB	30	107
48	Meifang Li	CHN	GPC	35	102
48	Clemilda Fernandes Silva	BRA	USC	34	102
50	Tetyana Styazhkina	UKR	USC	36	98
51	Alex Wrubleski	CAN	COL	29	97
52	Monica Holler	SWE	BCT	29	95.5
53	Linda Villumsen	DEN	TMP	28	91.33
54	Nikki Egyed	AUS	RLT	31	91
55	Élodie Touffet	FRA	MSG	33	90
56	Marissa van der Merwe	RSA		35	87
57	Olivia Gollan	AUS	MSG	40	86
58	Regina Bruins	NED		27	85
58	Marta Vila Josana Andreu	ESP	DGC	38	85
60	Bridie O'Donnell	AUS		39	84
61	Martine Bras	NED	LBL	35	80
62	Yuliya Martisova	RUS	FRW	37	78
62	Magali Mocquery	FRA	TPF	30	78
62	Lohse Rasmussen Dorte	DEN	MSG	42	78
62	Christine Thorburn	USA		44	78
66	Jeannie Longo-Ciprelli	FRA	UNG	55	77
67	Alexandra Burchenkova	RUS	PTG	25	76
68	Gina Grain	CAN	ECC	39	74
69	Daiva Tušlaitė	LTU	MIC	27	73
70	Lynette Burger	RSA		33	72
71	Andrea Bosman	NED	DSB	34	71
71	Lieselot Decroix	BEL	LBL	26	71
73	Annette Beutler	SUI		37	68
74	Tanja Hennes	GER	BCT	42	66.75
75	An Van Rie	BEL	AAD	39	65.91
76	Irene van den Broek	NED	AAD	33	64.91
77	Miho Oki	JPN	MSG	39	64
78	Loes Markerink	NED	FLX	28	63
79	Sigrid Corneo	ITA	MSG	42	62
79	Eva Lutz	GER	NUR	34	62
81	Sarah Düster	GER	RLT	31	60.66
82	Emma Rickards	AUS	RLT	40	60
83	Rasa Leleivytė	LTU		25	58
83	Laura Vangilder	USA	CRW	49	58
85	Yumari González	CUB		34	56
85	Kori Kelley Seehafer	USA	LIP	38	56
85	Alias Noor Azian	MAS		33	56
88	Stephanie Pohl	GER	TGH	26	55.83
89	Katherine Bates	AUS	TMP	31	54.5
90	Liesbet De Vocht	BEL	LBL	34	53
91	Brooke Miller	USA		37	51
92	Charlotte Becker	GER	NUR	30	50.25
93	Sara Carrigan	AUS	LBL	33	50
94	Tatiana Guderzo	ITA	AAD	29	48.91
95	Tina Liebig	GER	TGH	33	48.5
96	Bekker Lacota Mie	DEN	FLX	25	48
96	Elena Novikova	RUS	PTG	38	48
96	Sereina Trachsel	SUI		32	48
99	Belinda Goss	AUS		29	47
100	Karine Gautard	FRA	FUT	29	46

== UCI Teams Ranking ==
This is the ranking of the UCI women's teams from 2007.
Final result.

	Code	Team	Nation	Points
1	TMP	T-Mobile Women	GER	1863.33
2	DSB	Team DSB Bank	NED	1538.32
3	RLT	Raleigh Lifeforce Creation HB Pro Cycling Team	SUI	1538.32
4	NUR	Equipe Nürnberger Versicherung	GER	1512.5
5	FLX	Team Flexpoint	NED	1232.98
6	SAF	Safi–Pasta Zara–Manhattan	ITA	1150
7	BCT	Bigla Cycling Team	SUI	1140.48
8	MSG	Menikini–Selle Italia–Gysko	ITA	889
9	AAD	AA-Drink Cycling Team	NED	399.98
10	FUT	Vienne Futuroscope	FRA	384
11	LIP	Team Lipton	USA	382
12	COL	Colavita / Sutter Home Presented By Cooking Light	USA	331
13	FRW	A.S. Team F.R.W	ITA	309
14	TGH	Team Getränke-Hoffmann	GER	290.66
15	GPC	Giant Pro Cycling	HKG	285
16	MIC	S.C. Michela Fanini Record Rox	ITA	276
17	VLL	Vlaanderen–Caprisonne–T Interim	BEL	255
18	LBL	Lotto–Belisol Ladiesteam	BEL	254
19	TSW	Team Specialized Designs for Women	SUI	252
20	USC	USC Chirio Forno d'Asolo	ITA	248
21	DGC	Team Cmax Dila–Guerciotti–Cogeas	ESA	234
22	UNG	Team Uniqa	AUT	222
23	VVP	Vrienden van het Platteland	NED	204
24	CVA	Comunidad Valenciana	ESP	180
25	SEM	Saccarelli Emu Sea Marsciano	ITA	173
26	FEN	Fenixs–HPB	ITA	170
27	PTG	Petrogradets	RUS	166
28	CRW	Cheerwine	USA	137
29	ECC	Team Expresscopy.Com	CAN	112
30	TPF	Team Pro Feminin Du Genevois	FRA	96
31	GRT	Global Racing Team	GBR	78
32	BPD	Bizkaia–Panda Software–Durango	ESP	45
33	EHN	Elk Haus	AUT	39
34	RAC	Rapha/Condor	GBR	25
35	PAQ	POL–Aqua	POL	18
36	LPA	Les Pruneaux d'Agen	FRA	16
37	POC	Pratomagno Colombia	COL	12
38	TOG	Top Girls Fassa Bortolo Raxy Line	ITA	8

== Nations Ranking ==
Final result.

	Nation	Code	Points
1	Germany	GER	2211.49
2	Italy	ITA	2141.16
3	Netherlands	NED	2040.91
4	United States	USA	1158.16
5	Australia	AUS	1113.5
6	Great Britain	GBR	1083
7	Switzerland	SUI	949.15
8	Sweden	SWE	923.99
9	Lithuania	LTU	848.75
10	France	FRA	772
11	Austria	AUT	461.41
12	New Zealand	NZL	367.66
13	Russian Federation	RUS	365
14	Spain	ESP	310
15	China	CHN	301
16	Belgium	BEL	260.57
17	Denmark	DEN	254.33
18	South Africa	RSA	239
19	Canada	CAN	234
20	Brazil	BRA	231
21	Estonia	EST	163
22	El Salvador	ESA	154
23	Ukraine	UKR	141
24	Kazakhstan	KAZ	122.33
25	Japan	JPN	101
26	Czech Republic	CZE	88
27	Mexico	MEX	76
28	Korea	KOR	71
29	Poland	POL	64
30	Cuba	CUB	62
31	Venezuela	VEN	60
32	Norway	NOR	57
33	Malaysia	MAS	56
34	Colombia	COL	47
35	Ireland	IRL	38
36	Belarus	BLR	36
37	Croatia	CRO	30
37	Finland	FIN	30
37	Greece	GRE	30
37	Hungary	HUN	30
37	Israel	ISR	30
37	Portugal	POR	30
43	Belize	BIZ	25
43	Morocco	MAR	25
45	Namibia	NAM	22
46	Luxembourg	LUX	21
46	Serbia	SRB	21
48	Mongolia	MGL	18
49	Chinese Taipei	TPE	16
50	Vietnam	VIE	13
51	Jamaica	JAM	10
52	Indonesia	INA	9
53	Thailand	THA	8
54	Chile	CHI	7
55	Mauritius	MRI	6
56	Hong Kong, China	HKG	4

Preceded by 2006	UCI Women's Road Rankings; 2007	Succeeded by 2008
