= 2008 UCI Women's Road World Rankings =

2008 women's cycling rankings

The 2008 UCI Women's Road Rankings is an overview of the UCI Women's Road Rankings, based upon the results in all UCI-sanctioned races of the 2008 women's road cycling season.

== Summary ==
Final result.

| Top-ranked individual | Second-ranked individual | Third-ranked individual | Top-ranked team | Top-ranked nation |
|---|---|---|---|---|
| Marianne Vos (NED); Team DSB Bank | Judith Arndt (GER); Team Columbia Women | Ina Teutenberg (GER); Team Columbia Women | Team Columbia Women | Germany |

== Individual World Ranking (top 100) ==
Final result.

| | Cyclists | Nation | Team | Age | Points |
|---|---|---|---|---|---|
| 1 | Marianne Vos | NED | DSB | 26 | 1229 |
| 2 | Judith Arndt | GER | TMP | 37 | 1206.66 |
| 3 | Ina Teutenberg | GER | TMP | 39 | 616.16 |
| 4 | Nicole Cooke | GBR | HBH | 30 | 536 |
| 5 | Fabiana Luperini | ITA | MSI | 39 | 530 |
| 6 | Emma Johansson | SWE | AAD | 30 | 529 |
| 7 | Trixi Worrack | GER | NUR | 32 | 501.66 |
| 8 | Christiane Soeder | AUT | RLT | 38 | 495 |
| 9 | Kristin Armstrong | USA | RLT | 40 | 488 |
| 10 | Suzanne de Goede | NED | NUR | 29 | 436 |
| 11 | Kirsten Wild | NED | AAD | 31 | 423 |
| 12 | Susanne Ljungskog | SWE | FLX | 37 | 397 |
| 13 | Amber Neben | USA | FLX | 38 | 393 |
| 14 | Karin Thürig | SUI | RLT | 41 | 368 |
| 15 | Emma Pooley | GBR | TSW | 31 | 367 |
| 16 | Tatiana Guderzo | ITA | GAU | 29 | 360 |
| 17 | Luise Keller | GER | TMP | 29 | 357.16 |
| 18 | Giorgia Bronzini | ITA | TFA | 30 | 296 |
| 19 | Chantal Beltman | NED | TMP | 37 | 291 |
| 20 | Rochelle Gilmore | AUS | | 32 | 267 |
| 21 | Yuliya Martisova | RUS | GAU | 37 | 267 |
| 22 | Diana Žiliūtė | LTU | SAF | 37 | 248 |
| 23 | Oenone Wood | AUS | TMP | 33 | 246 |
| 24 | Regina Schleicher | GER | NUR | 39 | 245 |
| 25 | Noemi Cantele | ITA | BCT | 32 | 243 |
| 26 | Linda Villumsen | DEN | TMP | 28 | 242.16 |
| 27 | Charlotte Becker | GER | NUR | 30 | 237.66 |
| 28 | Angela Hennig | GER | DSB | 32 | 223.75 |
| 29 | Priska Doppmann | SUI | RLT | 42 | 208 |
| 30 | Grete Treier | EST | GAU | 36 | 202 |
| 31 | Edita Pučinskaitė | LTU | NUR | 38 | 195.66 |
| 32 | Kori Kelley-Seehafer | USA | MSI | 38 | 194.25 |
| 33 | Alexandra Wrubleski | CAN | WEB | 29 | 194 |
| 34 | Nicole Brändli | SUI | BCT | 34 | 189 |
| 35 | Regina Bruins | NED | | 27 | 186.66 |
| 36 | Claudia Häusler | GER | NUR | 28 | 186.66 |
| 37 | Marta Bastianelli | ITA | DGC | 26 | 183 |
| 38 | Edwige Pitel | FRA | TPF | 46 | 177 |
| 39 | Tetyana Styazhkina | UKR | USC | 36 | 176 |
| 40 | Marta Vila Josana Andreu | ESP | DGC | 38 | 175 |
| 41 | Joanne Kiesanowski | NZL | FEN | 34 | 165 |
| 42 | Jeannie Longo-Ciprelli | FRA | TPF | 55 | 161 |
| 43 | Loes Markerink | NED | FLX | 28 | 157.5 |
| 44 | Mirjam Melchers-Van Poppel | NED | FLX | 38 | 142.66 |
| 45 | Miho Oki | JPN | MSI | 39 | 140 |
| 46 | Kimberly Anderson | USA | TMP | 45 | 136 |
| 47 | Mara Abbott | USA | TMP | 28 | 130 |
| 48 | Monica Holler | SWE | BCT | 29 | 127.75 |
| 49 | Zulfiya Zabirova | KAZ | BCT | 40 | 125 |
| 50 | Paulina Brzeźna | POL | AAD | 32 | 125 |
| 51 | Andrea Bosman | NED | DSB | 34 | 118.75 |
| 52 | Meifang Li | CHN | GPC | 35 | 117 |
| 53 | Alexandra Burchenkova | RUS | PTG | 25 | 115 |
| 54 | Judith Machado Jaimes Karelia | VEN | | 34 | 112 |
| 55 | Jolanta Polikevičiūtė | LTU | USC | 43 | 109 |
| 56 | Katheryn Curi Mattis | USA | WEB | 39 | 106 |
| 57 | Brooke Miller | USA | | 37 | 106 |
| 58 | Monia Baccaille | ITA | FEN | 29 | 104 |
| 59 | Gao Min | CHN | GPC | 31 | 103 |
| 60 | Natalia Boyarskaya | RUS | FEN | 30 | 102 |
| 61 | Cashandra Slingerland | RSA | | 39 | 98 |
| 62 | Rasa Leleivytė | LTU | MIC | 25 | 96 |
| 63 | Yumari González | CUB | | 34 | 94 |
| 64 | Tatiana Antoshina | RUS | FEN | 31 | 94 |
| 65 | Loes Gunnewijk | NED | FLX | 33 | 89.5 |
| 66 | Rosane Kirch | BRA | MIC | 37 | 88 |
| 67 | Vera Koedooder | NED | LBL | 30 | 85 |
| 68 | Grace Verbeke | BEL | LBL | 29 | 85 |
| 69 | Danielys García | VEN | | 27 | 83 |
| 70 | Belem Guerrero Méndez | MEX | | 39 | 83 |
| 71 | Erinne Willock | CAN | WEB | 32 | 83 |
| 72 | Christel Ferrier-Bruneau | FRA | TLG | 34 | 82 |
| 73 | Liesbet De Vocht | BEL | VVP | 34 | 77.25 |
| 74 | Adrie Visser | NED | DSB | 30 | 76.75 |
| 75 | Anne Samplonius | CAN | | 45 | 76 |
| 76 | Janildes Fernandes Silva | BRA | USC | 33 | 76 |
| 77 | Larissa Kleinmann | GER | NUR | 35 | 76 |
| 78 | Martine Bras | NED | VVP | 35 | 75 |
| 79 | Ellen van Dijk | NED | VVP | 26 | 74.91 |
| 80 | Andrea Thürig | SUI | BCT | 35 | 73.75 |
| 81 | Martina Corazza | ITA | GAU | 34 | 72 |
| 82 | Giuseppina Grassi Herrera | MEX | | 37 | 71 |
| 83 | Vicki Whitelaw | AUS | | 36 | 70 |
| 84 | Marissa van der Merwe | RSA | | 35 | 70 |
| 85 | Emma Rickards | AUS | RLT | 40 | 70 |
| 86 | Lesya Kalytovska | UKR | | 25 | 67 |
| 87 | Sara Mustonen | SWE | DGC | 32 | 65 |
| 88 | Annemiek van Vleuten | NED | VVP | 31 | 64.25 |
| 89 | Sarah Düster | GER | RLT | 31 | 62 |
| 90 | Trine Schmidt | DEN | FLX | 25 | 61.5 |
| 91 | Sara Carrigan | AUS | LBL | 33 | 61 |
| 92 | Eva Lutz | GER | NUR | 34 | 60 |
| 93 | Svitlana Halyuk | UKR | | 26 | 59 |
| 94 | Maja Włoszczowska | POL | | 30 | 58 |
| 95 | Modesta Vžesniauskaitė | LTU | NUR | 30 | 58 |
| 96 | Maribel Moreno Allue | ESP | | 32 | 57 |
| 97 | Leigh Hobson | CAN | | 43 | 57 |
| 98 | Emilia Fahlin | SWE | TMP | 25 | 54 |
| 99 | Angie González | VEN | | 32 | 53 |
| 100 | Ludivine Henrion | BEL | AAD | 29 | 53 |

== UCI Teams Ranking ==
This is the ranking of the UCI women's teams from 2008.
Final result.

| | Code | Team | Nation | Points |
|---|---|---|---|---|
| 1 | TMP | Team Columbia Women | GER | 2470.98 |
| 2 | DSB | Team DSB Bank | NED | 1648.25 |
| 3 | RLT | Cervelo Lifeforce Pro Cycling Team | SUI | 1559 |
| 4 | NUR | Equipe Nürnberger Versicherung | GER | 1420.32 |
| 5 | AAD | AA-Drink Cycling Team | NED | 1130 |
| 6 | FLX | Team Flexpoint | NED | 1090.16 |
| 7 | MSI | Menikini Selle Italia Master Colors | ITA | 907.5 |
| 8 | GAU | Gauss RDZ Ormu | ITA | 901 |
| 9 | BCT | Bigla Cycling Team | SUI | 684.75 |
| 10 | HBH | Team Halfords Bikehut | GBR | 592 |
| 11 | FEN | Fenixs | ITA | 465 |
| 12 | DGC | Team Cmax Dila | ITA | 434 |
| 13 | WEB | Webcor Builders Cycling Team | USA | 430 |
| 14 | TSW | Team Specialized Designs for Women | SUI | 413 |
| 15 | USC | USC Chirio Forno D'Asolo | ITA | 408 |
| 16 | TPF | Team Pro Feminin Les Carroz | FRA | 345 |
| 17 | TFA | Cycling Team Titanedi-Frezza Acca Due O | ITA | 334 |
| 18 | GPC | Giant Pro Cycling | HKG | 304 |
| 19 | VVP | Vrienden van het Platteland | NED | 291.41 |
| 20 | SAF | Safi–Pasta Zara–Manhattan | ITA | 266 |
| 21 | LBL | Lotto–Belisol Ladiesteam | BEL | 247 |
| 22 | MIC | S.C. Michela Fanini Record Rox | ITA | 232 |
| 23 | PTG | Petrogradets | RUS | 135 |
| 24 | TLG | Team Lot-Et-Garonne | FRA | 112 |
| 25 | UNG | Team Uniqa | AUT | 111.5 |
| 26 | FUT | Vienne Futuroscope | FRA | 84 |
| 27 | ESG | ESGL 93–GSD Gestion | FRA | 76 |
| 28 | TOG | Top Girls Fassa Bortolo Raxy Line | ITA | 59 |
| 29 | GRT | Swift Racing | GBR | 47 |
| 30 | BPD | Bizkaia–Durango | ESP | 26.5 |
| 31 | PAQ | POL–Aqua | POL | 24 |
| 32 | VLL | Topsport Vlaanderen Thompson Ladies Team | BEL | 23 |
| 33 | EHN | Elk Haus | AUT | 21 |
| 34 | PRI | Primus | POL | 20 |

== Nations Ranking ==
Final result.

| | Nation | Code | Points |
|---|---|---|---|
| 1 | Germany | GER | 2926.64 |
| 2 | Netherlands | NED | 2565.66 |
| 3 | Italy | ITA | 1612 |
| 4 | United States | USA | 1341.25 |
| 5 | Sweden | SWE | 1172.75 |
| 6 | Great Britain | GBR | 959 |
| 7 | Switzerland | SUI | 885.75 |
| 8 | Australia | AUS | 714 |
| 9 | Lithuania | LTU | 706.66 |
| 10 | Russian Federation | RUS | 621.25 |
| 11 | Austria | AUT | 570 |
| 12 | France | FRA | 517 |
| 13 | Canada | CAN | 427 |
| 14 | Ukraine | UKR | 360 |
| 15 | Denmark | DEN | 347.66 |
| 16 | China | CHN | 334 |
| 17 | Spain | ESP | 316 |
| 18 | Belgium | BEL | 271.5 |
| 19 | Venezuela | VEN | 261 |
| 20 | Poland | POL | 227 |
| 21 | Brazil | BRA | 223 |
| 22 | Estonia | EST | 219 |
| 23 | South Africa | RSA | 211 |
| 24 | Japan | JPN | 209 |
| 25 | Mexico | MEX | 196 |
| 26 | New Zealand | NZL | 193 |
| 27 | Cuba | CUB | 160 |
| 28 | Kazakhstan | KAZ | 148 |
| 29 | Morocco | MAR | 81 |
| 30 | Luxembourg | LUX | 78 |
| 31 | South Korea | KOR | 59 |
| 32 | Norway | NOR | 55 |
| 33 | Argentina | ARG | 52 |
| 34 | Belarus | BLR | 50 |
| 35 | Czech Republic | CZE | 39 |
| 36 | Mauritius | MRI | 38 |
| 37 | Thailand | THA | 33 |
| 38 | Finland | FIN | 32.5 |
| 39 | Costa Rica | CRC | 30 |
| 40 | Ireland | IRL | 30 |
| 41 | Croatia | CRO | 30 |
| 42 | Israel | ISR | 30 |
| 43 | Greece | GRE | 30 |
| 44 | Hungary | HUN | 30 |
| 45 | Malaysia | MAS | 25 |
| 46 | Indonesia | INA | 25 |
| 47 | Jamaica | JAM | 25 |
| 48 | Serbia | SRB | 20 |
| 49 | Colombia | COL | 19 |
| 50 | Mongolia | MGL | 16 |
| 51 | Gabon | GAB | 10 |
| 52 | El Salvador | ESA | 4 |
| 53 | Chile | CHI | 3 |
| 54 | Hong Kong, China | HKG | 3 |
| 55 | Slovenia | SLO | 2 |

== See also ==
- 2008–09 UCI Track Cycling World Ranking

| Preceded by 2007 | UCI Women's Road Rankings; 2008 | Succeeded by 2009 |
