= List of 2006 UCI Women's Teams and riders =

Listed below are the UCI Women's Teams that competed in 2006 women's road cycling events organized by the International Cycling Union (UCI) including the 2006 UCI Women's Road World Cup.

== Teams overview ==
UCI code	Team name	Country
EHN	Elk Haus Nö	Austria
UNG	Uniqa Graz	Austria
LBL	Lotto–Belisol Ladiesteam (2006 season)	Belgium
VLL	Vlaanderen–Caprisonne–T Interim	Belgium
ALI	Bianchi Aliverti Kookai	Denmark
BPD	Bizkaia–Panda Software–Durango	Spain
LPA	Les Pruneaux d'Agen	France
TPF	Team Pro Feminin du Genevois	France
FUT	Vienne Futuroscope	France
FBU	Team FBUK	United Kingdom
NUR	Equipe Nürnberger Versicherung (2006 season)	Germany
GPC	Giant Pro Cycling	Hong Kong
FRW	A.S. Team F.R.W.	Italy
FEN	Fenixs–Colnago	Italy
NMC	Nobili Rubinetterie–Menikini Cogeas	Italy
MIC	S.C. Michela Fanini Record Rox	Italy
SEM	Saccarelli Emu Marsciano	Italy
SAF	Safi–Pasta Zara–Manhattan	Italy
TOG	Top Girls Fassa Bortolo Raxy Line	Italy
USC	USC Chirio Forno d'Asolo	Italy
HCT	@Work Cycling Team	Netherlands
AAD	AA-Drink Cycling Team	Netherlands
BFL	Buitenpoort - Flexpoint Team (2006 season)	Netherlands
TSC	Therme Skin Care	Netherlands
VVP	Vrienden van het Platteland (2006 season)	Netherlands
BCT	Bigla Cycling Team	Switzerland
UPT	Univega Pro Cycling Team	Switzerland
TMP	Team T-Mobile Women	United States

== Riders ==
=== @Work Cycling Team ===
Ages as of 1 January 2006.

Rider	Date of birth
Suzan Simons (NED)	October 24, 1987 (aged 18)
Andrea Bosman (NED)	August 6, 1979 (aged 26)
Loes Markerink (NED)	December 14, 1985 (aged 20)
Areke Hassink (NED)	September 23, 1981 (aged 24)
Jolanda Cools-van Dongen (NED)	August 30, 1966 (aged 39)
Minke van Dongen (NED)	January 19, 1983 (aged 22)
Debby van de Berg (NED)	August 23, 1980 (aged 25)

Rider	Date of birth
Jaccolien Wallaard (NED)	September 30, 1982 (aged 23)
Judith Helmink (NED)	April 21, 1983 (aged 22)
Brigit Mulder (NED)	November 20, 1980 (aged 25)
Anita Valen de Vries (NOR)	December 12, 1968 (aged 37)
Liesbeth Bakker (NED)	July 6, 1986 (aged 19)
Linda Ringlever (NED)	November 12, 1982 (aged 23)

=== Bianchi Aliverti Kookai ===
Ages as of 1 January 2006.

Rider	Date of birth
Dorte Lohse Rasmussen (DEN)	March 16, 1971 (aged 34)
Mette Fischer Andreasen (DEN)	April 13, 1983 (aged 22)
Trine Hansen (DEN)	May 11, 1975 (aged 30)
Elena Kuchinskaya (RUS)	December 11, 1984 (aged 21)
Candida Daddio (ITA)	January 15, 1984 (aged 21)

Rider	Date of birth
Aloisia Daddio (ITA)	January 15, 1984 (aged 21)
Lise Christensen (DEN)	June 15, 1972 (aged 33)
Volha Hayeva (BLR)	November 2, 1982 (aged 23)
Maja Adamsen (DEN)	September 7, 1978 (aged 27)
Elena Faffaelli (ITA)	June 11, 1976 (aged 29)

=== Buitenpoort–Flexpoint Team ===
- (Switzerland) Annette Beutler (29/06/1976) Contract from 15 June
- (Netherlands) Loes Gunnewijk (27/11/1980)
- (Germany) Tanja Hennes (30/06/1971)
- (Germany) Luise Keller (08/03/1984)
- (Netherlands) Vera Koedooder (31/10/1983)
- (Sweden) Susanne Ljungskog (16/03/1976)
- (Netherlands) Mirjam Melchers (26/09/1975)
- (United States) Amber Neben (18/02/1975)
- (Netherlands) Sandra Rombouts (29/09/1976)
- (Germany) Madeleine Sandig (12/08/1983)
- (Netherlands) Elisabeth van Rooij (25/01/1973)
- (Netherlands) Suzanne van Veen (03/10/1987)
- (Denmark) Linda Villumsen (09/04/1985)

=== Lotto–Belisol Ladiesteam ===
- (France) Marielle Aunave
- (Australia) Claire Baxter
- (Belgium) Liesbet De Vocht
- (Belgium) Sofie De Vuyst
- (Belgium) Ludivine Henrion
- (Republic of Ireland) Siobhan Horgan
- (Belgium) Myriam Jacotey
- (Netherlands) Christa Pirard
- (Belgium) Kim Schoonbaert
- (Belgium) Inge Van Den Broeck
- (Belgium) An Van Rie
- (United States) Christine Verdaros
- (Belgium) Grace Verbeke
- (Australia) Kathryn Watt

=== Nobili Rubinetterie Menikini Cogeas ===
Ages as of 1 January 2006.

Rider	Date of birth
Emanuela Azzini (ITA)	October 6, 1981 (aged 24)
Silvia Valsecchi (ITA)	July 19, 1982 (aged 23)
Miho Oki (JPN)	March 8, 1974 (aged 31)
Sigrid Corneo (ITA)	April 27, 1971 (aged 34)
Evelyn García (ESA)	December 29, 1982 (aged 23)
Rebecca Bertolo (ITA)	March 21, 1986 (aged 19)
Olivia Gollan (AUS)	August 27, 1973 (aged 32)

Rider	Date of birth
Alessandra Borchi (ITA)	August 15, 1983 (aged 22)
Edita Pučinskaitė (LTU)	November 27, 1975 (aged 30)
Élodie Touffet (FRA)	December 17, 1980 (aged 25)
Marta Vila Josana Andreu (ESP)	March 13, 1975 (aged 30)
Milena Pirola (ITA)	August 20, 1984 (aged 21)
Oxana Kostenko (RUS)	July 9, 1982 (aged 23)
Sally Cowman (AUS)	April 1, 1984 (aged 21)

=== Team T-Mobile Women ===
Ages as of 1 January 2006.

Rider	Date of birth
Kim Anderson (USA)	January 28, 1968 (aged 37)
Judith Arndt (GER)	July 23, 1976 (aged 29)
Christina Becker (GER)	December 12, 1977 (aged 28)
Lyne Bessette (CAN)	March 10, 1975 (aged 30)
Kimberly Bruckner Baldwin (USA)	June 19, 1970 (aged 35)

Rider	Date of birth
Mari Holden Paulsen (USA)	March 30, 1971 (aged 34)
Magali Le Floc'h (FRA)	August 17, 1975 (aged 30)
Amy Moore (CAN)	December 17, 1973 (aged 32)
Rebecca Much (USA)	February 25, 1986 (aged 19)
Ina-Yoko Teutenberg (GER)	October 28, 1974 (aged 31)

=== Therme Skin Care ===
Ages as of 1 January 2006.

Rider	Date of birth
Nathalie van Katwijk (NED)	December 2, 1985 (aged 20)
Aukje de Koning (NED)	January 29, 1980 (aged 25)
Janneke Vos (NED)	March 20, 1977 (aged 28)
Bertine Spijkerman (NED)	May 31, 1982 (aged 23)
Irene van den Broek (NED)	August 26, 1980 (aged 25)

Rider	Date of birth
Yvonne Hijgenaar (NED)	May 15, 1980 (aged 25)
Kristy Miggels (NED)	August 6, 1980 (aged 25)
Marije Profijt (NED)	January 31, 1985 (aged 20)
Sandra Hart (NED)	August 30, 1974 (aged 31)
Elisabeth Braam (NED)	September 26, 1984 (aged 21)

=== Univega Pro Cycling Team ===
Ages as of 1 January 2006.

Rider	Date of birth
Priska Doppmann (SUI)	May 10, 1971 (aged 34)
Sarah Grab (SUI)	July 13, 1979 (aged 26)
Sereina Trachsel (SUI)	February 9, 1981 (aged 24)
Karin Thürig (SUI)	July 4, 1972 (aged 33)
Christiane Soeder (AUT)	January 15, 1975 (aged 30)
Emma Rickards (AUS)	November 17, 1973 (aged 32)

Rider	Date of birth
Joanne Kiesanowski (NZL)	May 24, 1979 (aged 26)
Sarah Düster (GER)	July 10, 1982 (aged 23)
Nicole Cooke (GBR)	April 13, 1983 (aged 22)
Pascale Schnider (SUI)	October 18, 1984 (aged 21)
Franziska Roethlin (SUI)	March 15, 1979 (aged 26)

=== Vrienden van het Platteland ===
Ages as of 1 January 2006.

Rider	Date of birth
Chantal Beltman (NED)	August 25, 1976 (aged 29)
Janne Brok (NED)	June 7, 1987 (aged 18)
Ellen van Dijk (NED)	February 11, 1987 (aged 18)
Sharon van Essen (NED)	March 3, 1981 (aged 24)
Corrien van Haastert (NED)	February 11, 1982 (aged 23)
Esther van der Helm (NED)	September 5, 1981 (aged 24)

Rider	Date of birth
Yvonne Leezer (NED)	February 9, 1987 (aged 18)
Moniek Rotmensen (NED)	April 25, 1986 (aged 19)
Iris Slappendel (NED)	February 18, 1985 (aged 20)
Monique Verstraten (NED)	April 24, 1983 (aged 22)
Heidi de Voogd (NED)	January 9, 1980 (aged 25)

Preceded by 2005	List of UCI Women's Teams; 2006	Succeeded by 2007
