= List of 2007 UCI Women's Teams and riders =

Listed below are the UCI Women's Teams that competed in 2007 women's road cycling events organized by the International Cycling Union (UCI) including the 2007 UCI Women's Road World Cup.

== Teams overview ==
| UCI Code | Team Name | Country |
|---|---|---|
| EHN | Elk Haus | Austria |
| UNG | Team Uniqa | Austria |
| VLL | Vlaanderen–Caprisonne–T Interim | Belgium |
| LBL | Lotto–Belisol Ladiesteam | Belgium |
| ECC | Team Expresscopy.com | Canada |
| POC | Pratomagno Colombia | Colombia |
| DGC | Team CMAX Dila–Guerciotti–Cogeas | El Salvador |
| BPD | Bizkaia–Panda Software–Durango | Spain |
| CVA | Valencian Community | Spain |
| FUT | Vienne Futuroscope | France |
| TPF | Team Pro Feminin du Genevois | France |
| ESG | Entente Sportive Gervais Lilas 93 (ESGL93) | France |
| LPA | Les Pruneaux d'Agen | France |
| GRT | Global Racing Team | United Kingdom |
| RAC | Rapha/Condor | United Kingdom |
| NUR | Equipe Nürnberger Versicherung | Germany |
| TMP | T-Mobile Women | Germany |
| TGH | Team Getränke-Hoffmann | Germany |
| GPC | Giant Pro Cycling | Hong Kong |
| FRW | A.S. Team F.R.W | Italy |
| FEN | Fenixs–HPB | Italy |
| SAF | Safi–Pasta Zara–Manhattan | Italy |
| USC | USC Chirio Forno d'Asolo | Italy |
| MGT | Menikini Gysko | Italy |
| SEM | Saccarelli Emu Sea Marsciano | Italy |
| MIC | S.C. Michela Fanini Record Rox | Italy |
| TOG | Top Girls Fassa Bortolo Raxy Line | Italy |
| TSC | Therme Skin Care | Netherlands |
| AAD | AA-Drink Cycling Team | Netherlands |
| DSB | Team DSB Bank | Netherlands |
| VVP | Vrienden van het Platteland (2007 season) | Netherlands |
| FLX | Team Flexpoint | Netherlands |
| PAQ | POL–Aqua | Poland |
| PRI | Primus | Poland |
| PTG | Petrogradets | Russia |
| RLT | Raleigh–Lifeforce–Creation HB Pro Cycling Team | Switzerland |
| BCT | Bigla Cycling Team | Switzerland |
| TSW | Team Specialized Designs for Women | Switzerland |
| LIP | Team Lipton | United States |
| CRW | Cheerwine | United States |
| COL | Colavita/Sutter Home Presented By Cooking Light | United States |
| VBR | Verducci Breakaway Racing | United States |

== Riders ==
=== A.S. Team F.R.W ===
Ages as of 1 January 2007.

| Rider | Date of birth |
|---|---|
| Tania Belvederesi (ITA) | January 31, 1978 (aged 28) |
| Sara Biondi (ITA) | January 5, 1987 (aged 19) |
| Elena Cimatti (ITA) | July 10, 1988 (aged 18) |
| Martina Corazza (ITA) | June 8, 1979 (aged 27) |
| Elena Kuchinskaya (RUS) | December 11, 1984 (aged 22) |
| Verónica Leal Balderas (MEX) | October 15, 1977 (aged 29) |
| Kettj Manfrin (ITA) | May 6, 1981 (aged 25) |

| Rider | Date of birth |
|---|---|
| Yuliya Martisova (RUS) | June 15, 1976 (aged 30) |
| Marina Onofri (ITA) | March 4, 1987 (aged 19) |
| Silvia Parietti (ITA) | March 19, 1978 (aged 28) |
| Tatsiana Sharakova (BLR) | July 31, 1984 (aged 22) |
| Eleonora Soldo (ITA) | January 17, 1984 (aged 22) |
| Sabrina Zogli (ITA) | March 21, 1986 (aged 20) |

=== Cheerwine ===
Ages as of 1 January 2007.

| Rider | Date of birth |
|---|---|
| Laura Van Gilder (USA) | December 11, 1964 (aged 42) |
| Rachel O'Connell (AUS) | December 31, 1979 (aged 27) |
| Chrissy Ruiter (USA) | March 18, 1979 (aged 27) |
| Leigh Hobson (CAN) | August 10, 1970 (aged 36) |
| Sarah Bamberger (USA) | September 20, 1974 (aged 32) |
| Brooke Ourada (NZL) | June 2, 1977 (aged 29) |

| Rider | Date of birth |
|---|---|
| Elizabeth Frye (USA) | April 10, 1969 (aged 37) |
| Betina Hold (CAN) | June 29, 1970 (aged 36) |
| Clara Beard (USA) | January 7, 1984 (aged 22) |
| Kelly Benjamin (USA) | May 7, 1975 (aged 31) |
| Sarah Uhl (USA) | August 1, 1983 (aged 23) |
| Catherine Cheatley (NZL) | April 6, 1983 (aged 23) |

=== Colavita/Sutter Home Presented By Cooking Light ===
Ages as of 1 January 2007.

| Rider | Date of birth |
|---|---|
| Tina Mayolo Pic (USA) | May 9, 1966 (aged 40) |
| Alison Powers (USA) | December 14, 1979 (aged 27) |
| Andrea Dvorak (USA) | October 9, 1980 (aged 26) |
| Dotsie Bausch (USA) | March 6, 1973 (aged 33) |
| Sarah Tillontson (USA) | April 23, 1977 (aged 29) |
| Iona Wynter (JAM) | November 25, 1968 (aged 38) |

| Rider | Date of birth |
|---|---|
| Candice Blickem (USA) | May 23, 1979 (aged 27) |
| Stacey Spencer (CAN) | April 11, 1972 (aged 34) |
| Mackenzie Dickey (USA) | September 14, 1982 (aged 24) |
| Alexandra Wrubleski (CAN) | May 31, 1984 (aged 22) |
| Susan Palmer-Komar (CAN) | January 27, 1967 (aged 39) |

=== Lotto–Belisol Ladiesteam ===
- Kim Schoonbaert (BEL)
- Elise Depoorter (BEL)
- Liesbet De Vocht (BEL)
- Catherine Delfosse (BEL) (in from Team Massi Abarth (MTB))
- Lieselot Decroix (BEL) (in from Velo Bella)
- Martine Bras (NED) (in from Moving Ladies)
- Corine Hierckens (BEL) (in from AA Drink)
- Grace Verbeken (BEL)
- Sara Carrigan (AUS)
- Siobhan Dervan (IRL)
- Tamara Boyd (NZL) (in from Les Pruneaux d'Agen)
- Yolandi Du Toit (RSA) (in from Team FBUK)
- Kathy Watt (AUS)
- Sofie De Vuyst (BEL)
- Jurrina Duprez (BEL)
- Annelies Van Doorslaer (BEL)
- Laura Van Geyt (BEL)
- Nana Steenssens (NED)
- Ine Beyen (BEL)
- Lien Beyen (BEL)
- Denise D'Hamecourt (BEL)
- Jenifer De Merlier (BEL)
- Kelly Druyts (BEL)
- Evi Verstraete (BEL)
- Lien Lanssens (BEL)
- Arien Torsius (RSA)
- Natalia Llaca (MEX)

=== Rapha/Condor ===
Ages as of 1 January 2007.

| Rider | Date of birth |
|---|---|
| Ana Gabriela Larios Garcia (ESA) | July 7, 1979 (aged 27) |
| Catherine Hare Willianson (GBR) | March 13, 1982 (aged 24) |
| Lorna Webb (GBR) | May 26, 1983 (aged 23) |
| Julie O'Hagan (IRL) | June 13, 1972 (aged 34) |
| Jane Kilmartin (IRL) | November 7, 1969 (aged 37) |
| Melissa Flagothier (BEL) | December 8, 1985 (aged 21) |

| Rider | Date of birth |
|---|---|
| Amy Mosen (NZL) | June 27, 1984 (aged 22) |
| Arien Torsius (RSA) | April 3, 1987 (aged 19) |
| Nina Kessler (NED) | July 4, 1988 (aged 18) |
| Michelle Roberts (GBR) | August 2, 1970 (aged 36) |
| Kimberley Blythe (GBR) | October 26, 1987 (aged 19) |

=== Saccarelli Emu Sea Marsciano ===
Ages as of 1 January 2007.

| Rider | Date of birth |
|---|---|
| Monia Baccaille (ITA) | April 10, 1984 (aged 22) |
| Leda Cox (GBR) | January 6, 1975 (aged 31) |
| Alessandra D'Ettorre (ITA) | May 8, 1978 (aged 28) |
| Arianna Frasinetti (ITA) | September 17, 1981 (aged 25) |
| Alice Marmorini (ITA) | January 11, 1987 (aged 19) |
| Alessia Quarta (ITA) | June 23, 1976 (aged 30) |
| Miyoko Karami (JPN) | September 6, 1974 (aged 32) |

| Rider | Date of birth |
|---|---|
| Silvia Mancini (ITA) | March 23, 1986 (aged 20) |
| Elisa Frisoni (ITA) | August 8, 1985 (aged 21) |
| Samantha Galassi (ITA) | July 28, 1988 (aged 18) |
| Chiara Rozzini (ITA) | December 5, 1983 (aged 23) |
| Giovanna Troldi (ITA) | October 31, 1968 (aged 38) |
| Laura Silei (ITA) | May 14, 1977 (aged 29) |

=== Team Expresscopy.com ===
Ages as of 1 January 2007.

| Rider | Date of birth |
|---|---|
| Anne Samplonius (CAN) | February 11, 1968 (aged 38) |
| Audrey Lemieux (CAN) | May 9, 1985 (aged 21) |
| Amanda Shaw (CAN) | July 9, 1972 (aged 34) |
| Erinne Willock (CAN) | October 16, 1981 (aged 25) |
| Gina Grain (CAN) | June 16, 1974 (aged 32) |
| Melissa Holt (NZL) | December 11, 1976 (aged 30) |

| Rider | Date of birth |
|---|---|
| Jessica Phillips (USA) | May 22, 1978 (aged 28) |
| Joëlle Numainville (CAN) | November 20, 1987 (aged 19) |
| Alison Testroete (CAN) | July 22, 1983 (aged 23) |
| Stéphanie Bourbeau (CAN) | May 19, 1975 (aged 31) |
| Jennifer Magur (USA) | September 11, 1972 (aged 34) |

=== Team Flexpoint ===
- Mirjam Melchers (Ned)
- Susanne Ljungskog (Swe)
- Amber Neben (USA)
- Loes Gunnewijk (Ned)
- Mie Lacota (Den)
- Luise Keller (Ger)
- Moniek Kleinsman (Ned)
- Loes Markerink (Ned)
- Madeleine Sandig (Ger)
- Trine Schmidt (Den)
- Iris Slappendel (Ned)
- Susanne van Veen (Ned)

=== Team Getränke-Hoffmann ===
Ages as of 1 January 2007.

| Rider | Date of birth |
|---|---|
| Nathalie Bates (AUS) | March 29, 1980 (aged 26) |
| Christina Becker (GER) | December 12, 1977 (aged 29) |
| Angela Hennig (GER) | January 15, 1981 (aged 25) |
| Elke Gebhardt (GER) | July 22, 1983 (aged 23) |
| Claudia Hecht (GER) | April 1, 1984 (aged 22) |
| Virginia Hennig (GER) | February 10, 1987 (aged 19) |
| Birgit Hollmann (GER) | December 31, 1973 (aged 33) |

| Rider | Date of birth |
|---|---|
| Jane Kientzsch (GER) | March 14, 1984 (aged 22) |
| Tina Liebig (GER) | April 28, 1980 (aged 26) |
| Sandra Missbach (GER) | March 19, 1978 (aged 28) |
| Stephanie Pohl (GER) | October 21, 1987 (aged 19) |
| Theresa Senff (GER) | February 2, 1982 (aged 24) |
| Sabine Spitz (GER) | December 27, 1971 (aged 35) |

=== Team Lipton ===
Ages as of 1 January 2007.

| Rider | Date of birth |
|---|---|
| Kristin Armstrong (USA) | August 11, 1973 (aged 33) |
| Nicole Suzanne Evans (USA) | May 15, 1978 (aged 28) |
| Grace Fleury (USA) | August 31, 1978 (aged 28) |
| Kimberly Geist (USA) | April 29, 1987 (aged 19) |
| Lauren Tamayo (USA) | October 25, 1983 (aged 23) |

| Rider | Date of birth |
|---|---|
| Lara Kroepsch (USA) | November 27, 1978 (aged 28) |
| Kristen LaSasso (USA) | August 19, 1975 (aged 31) |
| Meredith Miller (USA) | December 26, 1973 (aged 33) |
| Brenda Lyons (USA) | July 17, 1969 (aged 37) |
| Kori Kelley-Seehafer (USA) | April 30, 1975 (aged 31) |

=== Therme Skin Care ===
Ages as of 1 January 2007.

| Rider | Date of birth |
|---|---|
| Elisabeth Braam (NED) | September 26, 1984 (aged 22) |
| Judith Helmink (NED) | April 21, 1983 (aged 23) |
| Bertine Spijkerman (NED) | May 31, 1982 (aged 24) |
| Kristy Miggels (NED) | August 6, 1980 (aged 26) |
| Yvonne Hijgenaar (NED) | May 15, 1980 (aged 26) |
| Marije Profijt (NED) | January 31, 1985 (aged 21) |

| Rider | Date of birth |
|---|---|
| Rixt Meijer (NED) | February 21, 1982 (aged 24) |
| Jennie Stenerhag (SWE) | June 6, 1975 (aged 31) |
| Hilde Slochteren (NED) | May 9, 1984 (aged 22) |
| Djoeke Donkers (NED) | June 7, 1984 (aged 22) |
| Annemiek van Vleuten (NED) | October 8, 1982 (aged 24) |

=== T-Mobile Women ===
Ages as of 1 January 2007.

| Rider | Date of birth |
|---|---|
| Kim Anderson (USA) | January 28, 1968 (aged 38) |
| Judith Arndt (GER) | July 23, 1976 (aged 30) |
| Kate Bates (AUS) | May 18, 1982 (aged 24) |
| Chantal Beltman (NED) | August 26, 1976 (aged 30) |
| Emilia Fahlin (SWE) | October 24, 1988 (aged 18) |
| Suzanne de Goede (NED) | April 16, 1984 (aged 22) |

| Rider | Date of birth |
|---|---|
| Alex Rhodes (AUS) | December 1, 1984 (aged 22) |
| Ina-Yoko Teutenberg (GER) | October 28, 1974 (aged 32) |
| Linda Villumsen (DEN) | April 9, 1985 (aged 21) |
| Anke Wichmann (GER) | August 28, 1975 (aged 31) |
| Oenone Wood (AUS) | September 24, 1980 (aged 26) |

=== Valencian Community ===
Ages as of 1 January 2007.

| Rider | Date of birth |
|---|---|
| Maribel Moreno Allue (ESP) | January 2, 1981 (aged 25) |
| Silvia Tirado Marquez (ESP) | July 27, 1986 (aged 20) |
| Maria Auxiliadora Martín Morales (ESP) | July 8, 1986 (aged 20) |
| Maria Rosario Rodriguez (ESP) | June 11, 1982 (aged 24) |

| Rider | Date of birth |
|---|---|
| Débora Gálves Lopez (ESP) | May 17, 1985 (aged 21) |
| Ana Garcia Antequera (ESP) | January 30, 1981 (aged 25) |
| Anna Sanchis Chafer (ESP) | October 18, 1987 (aged 19) |
| Susana Pascual Ruiz (ESP) | December 9, 1979 (aged 27) |

=== Vrienden van het Platteland ===
Ages as of 1 January 2007.

| Rider | Date of birth |
|---|---|
| Liesbeth Bakker (NED) | July 1, 1986 (aged 20) |
| Janne Brok (NED) | June 7, 1987 (aged 19) |
| Katie Brown (AUS) | February 2, 1983 (aged 23) |
| Ellen van Dijk (NED) | February 11, 1987 (aged 19) |
| Yvonne Leezer (NED) | February 9, 1987 (aged 19) |
| Emma Mackie (AUS) | September 9, 1984 (aged 22) |

| Rider | Date of birth |
|---|---|
| Anita Valen (NOR) | December 12, 1968 (aged 38) |
| Monique van de Ree (NED) | March 2, 1988 (aged 18) |
| Moniek Rotmensen (NED) | April 25, 1986 (aged 20) |
| Monique Verstraten (NED) | April 24, 1983 (aged 23) |
| Jaccolien Wallaard (NED) | September 30, 1982 (aged 24) |

| Preceded by 2006 | List of UCI Women's Teams; 2007 | Succeeded by 2008 |
