= 2006 UCI Women's Road World Rankings =

The 2006 UCI Women's Road Rankings is an overview of the UCI Women's Road Rankings, based upon the results in all UCI-sanctioned races of the 2006 women's road cycling season.

== Summary ==
Final result.

Top-ranked individual	Second-ranked individual	Third-ranked individual	Top-ranked team	Top-ranked nation
Nicole Cooke (GBR); Univega Pro Cycling Team	Marianne Vos (NED); Team DSB Bank	Susanne Ljungskog (SWE); Buitenpoort - Flexpoint Team	Univega Pro Cycling Team	Germany

== Individual World Ranking (top 100) ==
Final result.

	Cyclists	Nation	Team	Age	Points
1	Nicole Cooke	GBR	UPT	30	1002.33
2	Marianne Vos	NED		26	738
3	Susanne Ljungskog	SWE	BFL	37	718.52
4	Trixi Worrack	GER	NUR	32	694.86
5	Judith Arndt	GER	TMP	37	623.32
6	Svetlana Bubnenkova	RUS	FEN	40	593.66
7	Nicole Brändli	SUI	BCT	34	590.66
8	Ina Teutenberg	GER	TMP	39	546.32
9	Oenone Wood	AUS	NUR	33	530.86
10	Priska Doppmann	SUI	UPT	42	468.33
11	Edita Pučinskaitė	LTU	NMC	38	439
12	Amber Neben	USA	BFL	38	403.19
13	Annette Beutler	SUI	BFL	37	390.66
14	Zoulfia Zabirova	KAZ	BCT	40	384.66
15	Regina Schleicher	GER	NUR	39	348.66
16	Theresa Senff	GER	AAD	31	334.58
17	Diana Žiliūtė	LTU	SAF	37	323.66
18	Christiane Soeder	AUT	UPT	38	321.33
19	Fabiana Luperini	ITA	TOG	39	312
20	Kristin Armstrong	USA		40	297.66
21	Suzanne de Goede	NED	AAD	29	280.58
22	Giorgia Bronzini	ITA	FRW	30	279.66
23	Noemi Cantele	ITA	BCT	32	258
24	Tatiana Guderzo	ITA	TOG	29	249.66
25	Olga Slyusareva	RUS	FEN	44	248
26	Loes Gunnewijk	NED	BFL	33	243.52
27	Kirsten Wild	NED	AAD	31	243.33
28	Monia Baccaille	ITA	SEM	29	233
29	Linda Villumsen	DEN	BFL	28	226.32
30	Chantal Beltman	NED	VVP	37	223
31	Karin Thürig	SUI	UPT	41	219.33
32	Tanja Hennes	GER	BFL	42	216.33
33	Christine Thorburn	USA		44	206
34	Olivia Gollan	AUS	NMC	40	190
35	Grace Fleury	USA		35	177.66
36	Joanne Kiesanowski	NZL	UPT	34	175.33
37	Sarah Ulmer	NZL		37	172
38	Katherine Bates	AUS	NUR	31	164.66
39	Mirjam Melchers-Van Poppel	NED	BFL	38	164
40	Marta Vilajosana Andreu	ESP	NMC	38	140
41	Andrea Graus	AUT	BCT	34	139.66
42	Loes Markerink	NED	HCT	28	136
43	Marina Jaunâtre	FRA	FUT	31	132.4
44	Monica Holler	SWE	BCT	29	130.66
45	Claudia Häusler	GER	NUR	28	118.86
46	Miho Oki	JPN	NMC	39	118
46	Aimee Vasse	USA		35	118
48	Kori Kelley Sehafer	USA		38	107.66
49	Tina Mayolo Pic	USA		47	104.66
50	Lohse Rasmussen Dorte	DEN	ALI	42	104.33
51	Clemilda Fernandes Silva	BRA		34	101
52	Edwige Pitel	FRA		46	98
53	Angela Brodtka	GER		32	93.25
54	Kathryn Watt	AUS	LBL	49	91
55	Béatrice Thomas	FRA	TPF	32	90.65
56	Sarah Düster	GER	UPT	31	90
57	Modesta Vžesniauskaitė	LTU	FRW	30	89
58	Élodie Touffet	FRA	NMC	33	87
59	Bertine Spijkerman	NED	TSC	31	86
60	Yolandi Du Toit	RSA	FBU	28	85
61	Lada Kozlíková	CZE		34	84
62	Yumari González	CUB		34	83
63	Songhee Han	KOR		30	80
64	Jeannie Longo-Ciprelli	FRA		55	76
65	Marissa van der Merwe	RSA		35	75
66	Grete Treier	EST		36	68
67	Madeleine Sandig	GER	BFL	30	66.53
68	Nikki Egyed	AUS	FUT	31	65.66
69	Annalisa Cucinotta	ITA	MIC	27	65
70	Rochelle Gilmore	AUS	SAF	32	64
71	Paulina Brzeźna	POL		32	63
72	Evelyn García	ESA	NMC	31	59
73	Li Liu Yong	CHN	GPC	33	58.33
74	Hanka Kupfernagel	GER		39	58
74	Ellen van Dijk	NED	VVP	26	58
76	Adrie Visser	NED	AAD	30	56.58
77	Ludivine Henrion	BEL	LBL	29	53
78	Fischer Andreasen Mette	DEN	ALI	30	52.33
79	Volha Hayeva	BLR	ALI	31	52
80	Lang Meng	CHN	GPC	29	49
80	Silvia Valsecchi	ITA	NMC	31	49
82	Andrea Bosman	NED	HCT	34	48
82	Bogumiła Matusiak	POL		42	48
82	Anne Samplonius	CAN		45	48
85	Kimberly Anderson	USA	TMP	45	47.32
86	Iris Slappendel	NED	VVP	28	47
86	Erinne Willock	CAN		32	47
88	Sigrid Corneo	ITA	NMC	42	46
88	Debby Mansveld	NED	VLL	41	46
90	Eneritz Iturriagaechevarria Mazag	ESP	TOG	33	45
90	Monica Montoya	COL		37	45
90	Liza Rachetto	USA		39	45
90	Tetyana Styazhkina	UKR	USC	36	45
94	Hye Lee Min	KOR		28	43
94	Ronel Van Wyk	RSA		35	43
96	Veronica Andrèasson	SWE	SAF	32	42
96	Rosane Kirch	BRA	MIC	37	42
96	Sharon Vandromme	BEL	VLL	30	42
99	Katherine Lambden	USA		34	41
99	Patricia Schwager	SUI	EHN	30	41

== UCI Teams Ranking ==
This is the ranking of the UCI women's teams from 2006.
Final result.

	Code	Team	Nation	Points
1	UPT	Univega Pro Cycling Team	SUI	2011.32
2	BFL	Buitenpoort - Flexpoint Team	NED	1755.89
3	NUR	Equipe Nürnberger Versicherung	GER	1739.04
4	BCT	Bigla Cycling Team	SUI	1372.98
5	TMP	T-mobile Professional Cycling	USA	1248.29
6	FEN	Fenixs–Colnago	ITA	919.48
7	AAD	AA-Drink Cycling Team	NED	915.07
8	NMC	Nobili Rubinetterie Menikini Cogeas	ITA	887
9	TOG	Top Girls Fassa Bortolo Raxy Line	ITA	639.32
10	SAF	Safi–Pasta Zara–Manhattan	ITA	453.32
11	FRW	A.S. Team F.R.W	ITA	374.66
12	VVP	Vrienden Van Het Platteland	NED	358
13	SEM	Saccarelli Emu Marsciano	ITA	267.66
14	ALI	Bianchi Aliverti Kookai	DEN	240.99
15	FUT	Vienne Futuroscope	FRA	219.12
16	HCT	@Work Cycling Team	NED	204
17	LBL	Lotto–Belisol Ladiesteam	BEL	188
18	MIC	S.C. Michela Fanini Record Rox	ITA	165
19	GPC	Giant Pro Cycling	HKG	145.66
20	TPF	Team Pro Feminin Du Genevois	FRA	132.15
21	TSC	Therme Skin Care	NED	124
22	VLL	Vlaanderen–Caprisonne–T Interim	BEL	120
23	USC	USC Chirio Forno D'Asolo	ITA	116.66
24	FBU	Team FBUK	GBR	93
25	LPA	Les Pruneaux d'Agen	FRA	81
26	EHN	Elk Haus Nö	AUT	59
27	BPD	Bizkaia–Panda Software–Durango	ESP	39.66
28	UNG	Uniqa Graz	AUT	28

== Nations Ranking ==
Final result.

	Nation	Code	Points
1	Germany	GER	2547.74
2	Netherlands	NED	1728.43
3	Switzerland	SUI	1709.98
4	Italy	ITA	1332.32
5	United States	USA	1202.51
6	Great Britain	GBR	1075.33
7	Australia	AUS	1042.18
8	Sweden	SWE	948.51
9	Russian Federation	RUS	916.32
10	Lithuania	LTU	901.66
11	Austria	AUT	491.99
12	France	FRA	484.05
13	Denmark	DEN	435.64
14	New Zealand	NZL	411.33
15	Kazakhstan	KAZ	386.66
16	South Africa	RSA	228
17	Brazil	BRA	225
18	Spain	ESP	210
19	Canada	CAN	170
20	Poland	POL	169
21	Belgium	BEL	161
22	China	CHN	145.99
23	Japan	JPN	145
24	Korea	KOR	136
25	Cuba	CUB	110
26	Czech Republic	CZE	107
27	Ukraine	UKR	84
28	Colombia	COL	83
29	El Salvador	ESA	76
30	Estonia	EST	70
31	Mexico	MEX	59
32	Belarus	BLR	57
33	Mauritius	MRI	54
34	Venezuela	VEN	52
35	Mongolia	MGL	49
36	Thailand	THA	46
37	Norway	NOR	31.32
38	Finland	FIN	30
38	Greece	GRE	30
38	Hungary	HUN	30
38	Ireland	IRL	30
38	Israel	ISR	30
38	Lebanon	LIB	30
38	Luxembourg	LUX	30
38	Republic of Moldova	MDA	30
46	Portugal	POR	27
47	Zimbabwe	ZIM	26
48	Turkey	TUR	25
49	Egypt	EGY	24
50	Indonesia	INA	12
51	Chinese Taipei	TPE	8
51	Costa Rica	CRC	8
53	Argentina	ARG	6
54	Hong Kong, China	HKG	2

Preceded by 2005	UCI Women's Road Rankings; 2006	Succeeded by 2007
