= 2006 Buitenpoort–Flexpoint Team season =

2006 Buitenpoort - Flexpoint Team
- UCI Team ranking: 2nd

Season victories
- One-day races
- Stage race overall
- Best ranked rider: Susanne Ljungskog (3rd)

The 2006 women's road cycling season was the second for the Buitenpoort - Flexpoint Team, a 2006 UCI women's cycling team.

== Roster ==
- (Switzerland) Annette Beutler (29/06/1976) Contract from 15 June
- (Netherlands) Loes Gunnewijk (27/11/1980)
- (Germany) Tanja Hennes (30/06/1971)
- (Germany) Luise Keller (08/03/1984)
- (Netherlands) Vera Koedooder (31/10/1983)
- (Sweden) Susanne Ljungskog (16/03/1976)
- (Netherlands) Mirjam Melchers (26/09/1975)
- (United States) Amber Neben (18/02/1975)
- (Netherlands) Sandra Rombouts (29/09/1976)
- (Germany) Madeleine Sandig (12/08/1983)
- (Netherlands) Elisabeth van Rooij (25/01/1973)
- (Netherlands) Suzanne van Veen (03/10/1987)
- (Denmark) Linda Villumsen (09/04/1985)

== Season victories ==
Single day and stage races 2006
Date	Nation	Race	Cat.	Winner
2 April	Belgium	Tour of Flanders	CDM	(Netherlands) Mirjam Melchers
14 May	France	Stage 3 (ITT) Tour de l'Aude Cycliste Féminin	2.1	(Netherlands) Loes Gunnewijk
20 May	France	Stage 9 Tour de l'Aude Cycliste Féminin	2.1	(Sweden) Susanne Ljungskog
21 May	France	Overall Tour de l'Aude Cycliste Féminin	2.1	(United States) Amber Neben
6 June	Spain	Durango-Durango Emakumeen Saria	1.2	(Sweden) Susanne Ljungskog
10 June	Spain	Stage 3b Iurreta-Emakumeen Bira	2.2	(Sweden) Susanne Ljungskog
15 June	Netherlands	Stage 1 (ITT) Rabo Ster Zeeuwsche Eilanden	2.2	(Denmark) Linda Villumsen
6 July	Italy	Stage 1 Giro d'Italia Femminile	2.1	(Sweden) Susanne Ljungskog
28 July	Sweden	Open de Suède Vårgårda	CDM	(Sweden) Susanne Ljungskog
13 August	France	Overall La Route de France	2.2	(Denmark) Linda Villumsen
20 August	France	Stage 2b Trophée d'Or Féminin	2.2	(Germany) Tanja Hennes
31 August	Netherlands	Stage 4b (TTT) Holland Ladies Tour	2.1	Buitenpoort–Flexpoint Team
2 September	Netherlands	Overall Holland Ladies Tour	2.1	(Sweden) Susanne Ljungskog
6 September	Netherlands	Stage 2 Euregio Ladies Tour	2.2	(Netherlands) Loes Gunnewijk

National, Continental and World champions 2006
Date	Discipline	Jersey	Winner
23 March	World University Championships – Women's time trial		(Netherlands) Loes Gunnewijk
20 June	Dutch National Time Trial Championships		Loes Gunnewijk
6 June	Pan American Time Trial Champion		(United States) Amber Neben
21 June	Danish National Time Trial Championships		Linda Villumsen
21 June	Swedish National Time Trial Championships		Susanne Ljungskog
22 June	Swedish National Road Race Championships		Susanne Ljungskog
24 June	Danish National Road Race Championships		Linda Villumsen
24 June	Swiss National Road Race Championships		Annette Beutler
13 July	European Time Trial Champion		(Denmark) Linda Villumsen

== Results in major races ==
Results at the 2006 UCI Women's Road World Cup races
#	Date	Race	Country	Best rider	Place
#1	26 February	Geelong World Cup	Australia	(Sweden) Susanne Ljungskog	17th
#2	5 March	New Zealand World Cup	New Zealand	(Sweden) Susanne Ljungskog	7th
#3	2 April	Tour of Flanders for Women	Belgium	(Netherlands) Mirjam Melchers	1st
#4	19 April	La Flèche Wallonne Féminine	Belgium	(United States) Amber Neben	5th
#5	23 April	Tour de Berne	Switzerland	(Sweden) Susanne Ljungskog	11th
#6	7 May	GP Castilla y Leon	Spain	(Sweden) Susanne Ljungskog	3rd
#7	27 May	Coupe du Monde Cycliste Féminine de Montréal	Canada		
#8	28 July	Open de Suède Vårgårda	Sweden	(Sweden) Susanne Ljungskog	1st
#9	30 July	The Ladies Golden Hour (TTT)	Denmark	Buitenpoort-Flexpoint	2nd
#10	26 August	GP de Plouay	France	(Sweden) Susanne Ljungskog	6th
#11	3 September	Lowland International Rotterdam Tour	Netherlands	(Germany) Tanja Hennes	2nd
#12	10 September	Rund um die Nürnberger Altstadt	Germany	(Switzerland) Annette Beutler	9th

== UCI World Ranking ==
The team finished second in the UCI ranking for teams.

Individual UCI World Ranking
Rank	Rider	Points
3	(Sweden) Susanne Ljungskog	718.52
12	(United States) Amber Neben	403.19
13	(Switzerland) Annette Beutler	390.66
26	(Netherlands) Loes Gunnewijk	243.52
29	(Denmark) Linda Villumsen	226.32
32	(Germany) Tanja Hennes	216.33
39	(Netherlands) Mirjam Melchers	164
67	(Germany) Madeleine Sandig	66.53
101	(Netherlands) Vera Koedooder	40
175	(Germany) Luise Keller	13
198	(Netherlands) Sandra Rombouts	11.2
