= 2006 Equipe Nürnberger Versicherung season =

2006 Nürnberger Versicherung
- UCI Team ranking: 3rd

Season victories
- One-day races
- Stage race overall
- Best ranked rider: Trixi Worrack (4th)

The 2006 women's road cycling season was the third for Equipe Nürnberger Versicherung, a 2006 UCI women's cycling team.

== Roster ==
- (Australia) Katherine Bates (18/05/1982)
- (Germany) Claudia Hecht (01/04/1984)
- (Germany) Claudia Häusler (17/11/1985)
- (Germany) Tina Liebig (28/04/1980)
- (Germany) Eva Lutz (28/05/1979)
- (Germany) Regina Schleicher (21/03/1974)
- (Germany) Anke Wichmann (28/08/1975)
- (Australia) Oenone Wood (24/09/1980)
- (Germany) Trixi Worrack (28/09/1981)

Not UCI registered

- (Germany) Sabine Fischer (08/11/1986)
- (Germany) Claudia Stumpf (12/03/1984)

== UCI World Ranking ==
The team finished third in the UCI ranking for teams.

Individual UCI World Ranking
Rank	Rider	Points
4	(Germany) Trixi Worrack	694.86
9	(Australia) Oenone Wood	530.86
15	(Germany) Regina Schleicher	348.66
38	(Australia) Katherine Bates	164.66
45	(Germany) Claudia Häusler	118.86
110	(Germany) Eva Lutz	34.86
114	(Germany) Tina Liebig	33
405	(Germany) Anke Wichmann	1.2
