= 2006 Lotto–Belisol Ladiesteam season =

2006 Lotto–Belisol Ladiesteam
- UCI Team ranking: 17th

Season victories
- One-day races: 3
- Stage race overall: 0
- Stage race stages: 0
- Best ranked rider: Kathryn Watt (AUS) (54th)

The 2006 women's road cycling season was the first for the Lotto–Belisol Ladiesteam cycling team.

== Roster ==
- (France) Marielle Aunave
- (Australia) Claire Baxter
- (Belgium) Liesbet De Vocht
- (Belgium) Sofie De Vuyst
- (Belgium) Ludivine Henrion
- (Republic of Ireland) Siobhan Horgan
- (Belgium) Myriam Jacotey
- (Netherlands) Christa Pirard
- (Belgium) Kim Schoonbaert
- (Belgium) Inge Van Den Broeck
- (Belgium) An Van Rie
- (United States) Christine Verdaros
- (Belgium) Grace Verbeke
- (Australia) Kathryn Watt

== Season victories ==
Single day and stage races 2006
Date	Nation	Race	Cat.	Winner
30 July	Belgium	Stage 1, 2 and General classification Wolvertem-Slozen	Nat.	(Belgium) Liesbet De Vocht

National, Continental and World champions 2006
Date	Discipline	Jersey	Winner
11 January	Australian National Time Trial Championships		Kathryn Watt
24 June	Irish National Road Race Championships		Siobhan Horgan
27 August	Belgian National Time Trial Championships		An Van Rie

== Results in major races ==
Results at the 2006 UCI Women's Road World Cup races
#	Date	Race	Country	Best rider	Place
#1	26 February	Geelong World Cup	Australia		
#2	5 March	New Zealand World Cup	New Zealand		
#3	2 April	Tour of Flanders for Women	Belgium	(Belgium) An Van Rie	34th
#4	19 April	La Flèche Wallonne Féminine	Belgium	(Belgium) An Van Rie	10th
#5	23 April	Tour de Berne	Switzerland		
#6	7 May	GP Castilla y Leon	Spain		
#7	27 May	Coupe du Monde Cycliste Féminine de Montréal	Canada		
#8	28 July	Open de Suède Vårgårda	Sweden		
#9	30 July	The Ladies Golden Hour	Denmark		
#10	26 August	GP de Plouay	France		
#11	3 September	Lowland International Rotterdam Tour	Netherlands		
#12	10 September	Rund um die Nürnberger Altstadt	Germany		

Results in other major single day races
Date	Race (Note: Riders are in these championships part of the national team)	Rider	Place
21 March	Commonwealth Games – Women's time trial	(Australia) Kathryn Watt	2nd place, silver medalist(s)
25 March	World University Championships – Women's road race	(Belgium) Ludivine Henrion	3rd place, bronze medalist(s)
15 July	European Road Championships – Women's under-23 road race	(Belgium) Ludivine Henrion	5th

== UCI World Ranking ==
The team finished 17th in the UCI ranking for teams.

Individual UCI World Ranking
Rank	Rider	Points
54	(Australia) Kathryn Watt	91
77	(Belgium) Ludivine Henrion	53
112	(Belgium) An Van Rie	34
202	(Republic of Ireland) Siobhan Dervan	10
291	(Belgium) Inge Van Den Broeck	6
