= 2008 UCI Road World Championships – Qualification =

This page is an overview of the qualification criteria for the 2008 UCI Road World Championships.

== Elite events ==
=== Elite men's road race ===
Qualification was based on performances on the UCI run tours during 2008. Results from January to the middle of August would count towards the qualification criteria on both the 2008 UCI ProTour and the UCI Continental Circuits across the world, with the rankings being determined upon the release of the numerous tour rankings on 15 August 2008.

14 to be enrolled, 9 to start
Spain
Italy
Belgium
Germany
Luxembourg
Australia
France
Switzerland
Russia
Netherlands
9 to be enrolled, 6 to start
South Africa
United States
Venezuela
Iran
Slovenia
Poland
Ukraine
United Kingdom
Portugal
Denmark
5 to be enrolled, 3 to start
Tunisia
Argentina
Colombia
Canada
Japan
Uzbekistan
Austria
Sweden
Croatia
Ireland
Hungary
Bulgaria
Slovakia
Latvia
Serbia
Estonia
New Zealand
Czech Republic
Finland
Norway
Kazakhstan
2 to be enrolled, 1 to start
Morocco
Cuba
Costa Rica
Ecuador
Mexico
Uruguay
Belarus
Sri Lanka
Lithuania

=== Elite women's road race ===
Qualification will be based mainly on the 2008 UCI Nation Ranking as of 15 August 2008. The first five nations in this classification qualified 7 riders to start, the next ten nations qualified 6 riders to start and the next 5 nations qualified 5 riders to start. Other nations and non ranked nations had the possibility to send 3 riders to start. Moreover, the outgoing World Champion and continental champions are qualified to take part in the race on top of the nation numbers.

=== Elite men's time trial ===
All National Federations were allowed to register four riders for the race, with a maximum of two riders to start. In addition to this number, the outgoing World Champion and the current continental champions may take part.

=== Elite women's time trial ===
All National Federations were allowed to enter four riders for the race, with a maximum of two riders to start. In addition to this number, the outgoing World Champion and the current continental champions were also able to take part.

Champion	Name	Note
Outgoing World Champion	Hanka Kupfernagel (GER)	Did not participate
African Champion	Lynette Burger (RSA)	Did not participate
Asian Champion	Li Meifang (CHN)	Did not participate
European Champion (under-23)	Ellen van Dijk (NED)	
Oceanian Champion	Bridie O'Donnell (AUS)	
Pan American Champion	Ana Paola Madrinan Villegas (COL)	Did not participate

== Under-23 events ==
=== Men's under-23 time trial ===
All National Federations were allowed to register four riders for the race, with a maximum of two riders to start. In addition to this number, the outgoing World Champion and the current continental champions may take part
