= Mirjam Hauser-Senn =

Swiss cyclist (born 1980)

Personal information
- Born: 9 September 1980 (age 46) Switzerland

Cycling career
- Sport: Cycling
- Discipline: Road cycling

Professional teams
- 2008: Team Specialized Designs for Women
- 2009: Bigla Cycling Team

Mirjam Hauser-Senn (born 9 September 1980) is a road cyclist from Switzerland. She represented her nation at the 2008 UCI Road World Championships.
