= Sarah Grab =

Swiss cyclist

Personal information
- Born: 13 July 1979 (age 47) Switzerland

Cycling career
- Sport: Cycling
- Discipline: Road cycling

Professional teams
- 2005–2006: Univega Pro Cycling Team
- 2008: Team Specialized Designs for Women

Sarah Grab (born 13 July 1979) is a road cyclist from Switzerland. She represented her nation at the 2002, 2004 and 2005 UCI Road World Championships.
