= 2006 Lowland International Rotterdam Tour =

2006 UCI Women's Road World Cup, race 11 of 12

Race details
- Dates: 3 September 2006
- Stages: 1
- Distance: 136.6 km (84.9 mi)
- Winning time: 3h 33' 47"

Results
	Winner	Ina-Yoko Teutenberg (GER)	(T-Mobile Professional Cycling)
	Second	Tanja Schmidt-Hennes (GER)	(Buitenpoort - Flexpoint Team)
	Third	Kirsten Wild (NED)	(AA-Drink Cycling Team)

The 2006 Lowland International Rotterdam Tour was the 9th (and last) UCI Women's Road World Cup running on the Lowland International Rotterdam Tour. It was held on 5 September 2006 over a distance of 140 kilometres (87.0 miles). 112 elite female cyclists took part in the race and 79 of them finished.

== General standings (top 10) ==
	Cyclists	Team	Time	World Cup points
1	Ina-Yoko Teutenberg (GER)	T-Mobile Professional Cycling	3h 42' 52"	75
2	Tanja Schmidt-Hennes (GER)	Buitenpoort - Flexpoint Team	s.t.	50
3	Kirsten Wild (NED)	AA-Drink Cycling Team	s.t.	35
4	Nicole Cooke (GBR)	Univega Pro Cycling Team	s.t.	30
5	Annette Beutler (SWI)	Buitenpoort - Flexpoint Team	s.t.	27
6	Ellen van Dijk (NED)	Vrienden van het Platteland	s.t.	24
7	Dorte Lohse Rasmussen (DEN)	Bianchi Aliverti Kookai	s.t.	21
8	Diana Ziliute (LTU)	Safi-Pasta Zara Manhattan	s.t.	18
9	Alessandra d'Ettorre (ITA)	Saccarelli Emu Marsciano	s.t.	15
10	Trixi Worrack (GER)	Equipe Nürnberger Versicherung	s.t.	11

Results from CQ ranking and cyclingarchives.

== World Cup standings (top 10 after race) ==
	Cyclists	Team	World Cup points
1	Nicole Cooke (GBR)	Univega Pro Cycling Team	419
2	Judith Arndt (GER)	T-Mobile Professional Cycling	236
3	Susanne Ljungskog (SWE)	Buitenpoort - Flexpoint Team	221
4	Annette Beutler (SWI)	Buitenpoort - Flexpoint Team	214
5	Ina Teutenberg (GER)	T-Mobile Professional Cycling	211
6	Oenone Wood (AUS)	Equipe Nürnberger Versicherung	170
7	Trixi Worrack (GER)	Equipe Nürnberger Versicherung	139
8	Zoulfia Zabirova (KAZ)	Bigla Cycling Team	120
9	Nicole Brändli (SWI)	Bigla Cycling Team	120
10	Theresa Senff (GER)	AA-Drink Cycling Team	106

Results from cyclingarchives.
