= UCI women's road world rankings =

System of ranking road bicycle racers

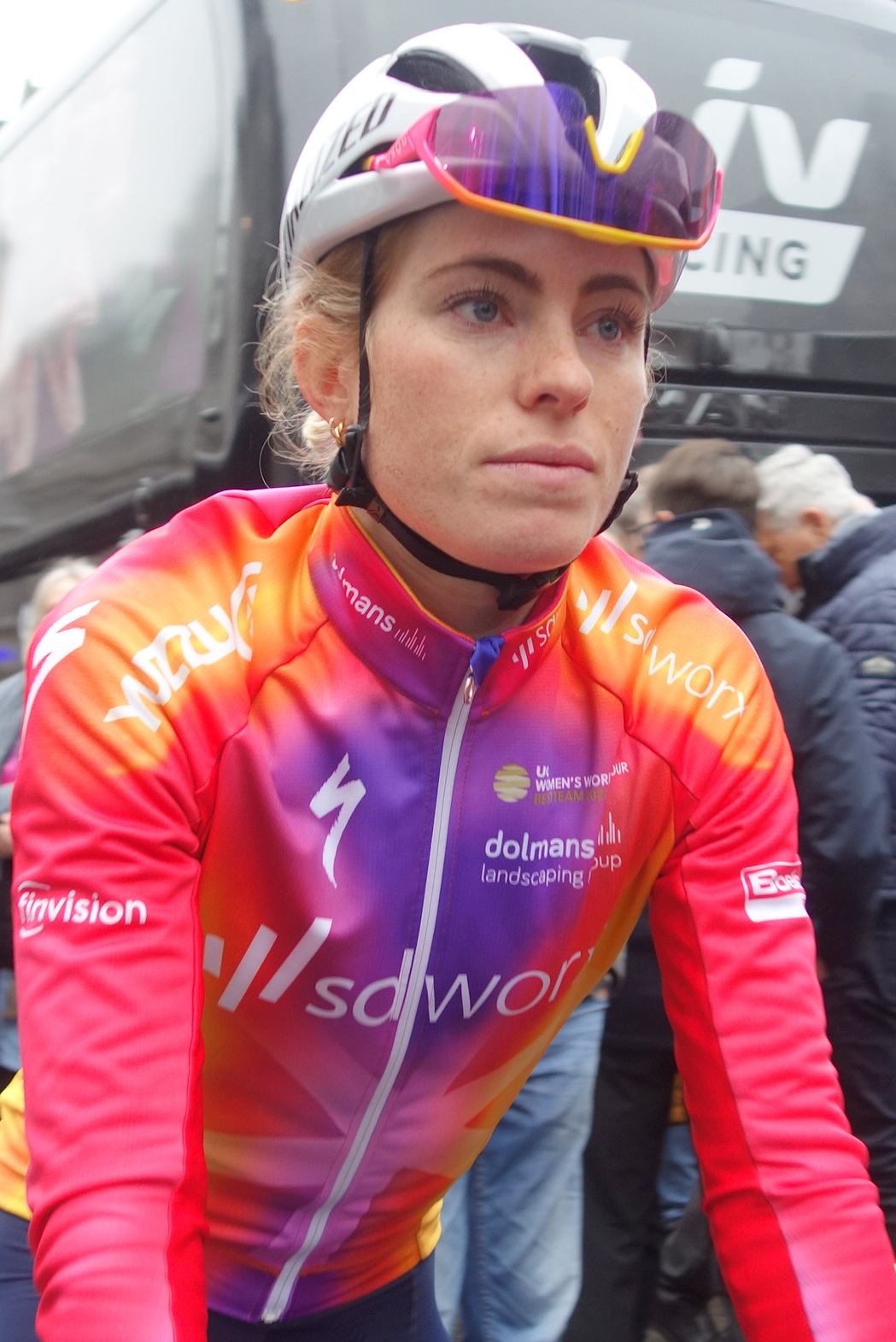
- Demi Vollering from FDJ United–Suez (current No.1 in individual ranking)
- Sport: Road bicycle racing
- Founded: 1994

The UCI women's road rankings is a system of ranking road bicycle racers based upon the results in all women's UCI-sanctioned races over a twelve-month period. The world rankings were first instituted by the UCI in 1994. Points are awarded according to finishing positions in each race, with lesser points for each stage of stage races and for wearing the race leader's jersey. The road races at the Olympics and Road World Championships are worth the most points. The team rankings are calculated by summing the points of the team's four best placed riders, and the national rankings by summing the points of the nation's five best placed riders.

Between 1998 and 2015, the competition was run in parallel to the UCI Women's Road World Cup, which has included only six to twelve of the most prestigious one-day races. These are worth more points than other one-day races. Between 2016 and 2024, the competition was run in parallel with the UCI Women's World Tour.

== Rankings ==
In the races throughout the year, points are earned for an individual ranking, a team ranking and a ranking by nation.

- Individual ranking: This is calculated monthly by adding the points obtained by each rider in a women's race on the UCI calendar. Points earned during the same period of the previous year are deducted.
- Team ranking: This is calculated monthly by adding the points obtained by the top four riders in the individual ranking of each UCI Women's Team. Since 2021, this ranking has been calculated as an annual championship rather than as an ongoing ranking.
- National ranking: This is calculated by adding the points obtained by the top five riders in the individual ranking of each nation.

== Current rankings ==
Riders (as of 18 August 2026)
| Rank | Rider | Team | Points | Prev | Move^{♦} |
|---|---|---|---|---|---|
| 1 | Demi Vollering (NED) | FDJ United–Suez | 8835 | 1 | Steady |
| 2 | Paula Blasi (ESP) | UAE Team L'Imad | 5412.33 | 2 | Steady |
| 3 | Katarzyna Niewiadoma (POL) | Canyon//SRAM | 5260 | 3 | Steady |
| 4 | Lorena Wiebes (NLD) | Team SD Worx–Protime | 4810 | 4 | Steady |
| 5 | Elisa Longo Borghini (ITA) | UAE Team L'Imad | 4507 | 5 | Steady |
| 6 | Anna van der Breggen (NLD) | Team SD Worx–Protime | 4464 | 6 | Steady |
| 7 | Lotte Kopecky (BEL) | Team SD Worx–Protime | 3534 | 7 | Steady |
| 8 | Antonia Niedermaier (DEU) | Canyon//SRAM | 3245.67 | 8 | Steady |
| 9 | Marlen Reusser (CHE) | Movistar Team | 3073 | 9 | Steady |
| 10 | Elisa Balsamo (ITA) | Lidl–Trek | 3041 | 10 | Steady |

^{♦}Change since previous week's rankings

Teams (as of 18 August 2026)
| Rank | Nation | Points | Prev. | Move |
|---|---|---|---|---|
| 1 | (France) FDJ United–Suez | 17901 | 1 | Steady |
| 2 | (United Arab Emirates) UAE Team L'Imad | 17863 | 2 | Steady |
| 3 | (Netherlands) Team SD Worx–Protime | 15447 | 3 | Steady |
| 4 | (Germany) Canyon//SRAM | 11186 | 4 | Steady |
| 5 | (Netherlands) Visma–Lease a Bike | 9173 | 5 | Steady |
| 6 | (Germany) Lidl–Trek | 8771 | 6 | Steady |
| 7 | (Belgium) Fenix–Premier Tech | 7589 | 7 | Steady |
| 8 | (Belgium) AG Insurance–Soudal | 7242 | 8 | Steady |
| 9 | (United States) EF Education–Oatly | 7159 | 9 | Steady |
| 10 | (Spain) Movistar Team | 5885 | 10 | Steady |

Nations (as of 18 August 2026)
| Rank | Nation | Points | Prev. | Move |
|---|---|---|---|---|
| 1 | Netherlands | 23800 | 1 | Steady |
| 2 | Italy | 12617 | 2 | Steady |
| 3 | Spain | 10367.99 | 3 | Steady |
| 4 | France | 9310.32 | 5 | ▲1 |
| 5 | Poland | 9295 | 6 | ▲1 |
| 6 | Switzerland | 9237 | 4 | ▼2 |
| 7 | Germany | 7879.01 | 7 | Steady |
| 8 | Belgium | 7471 | 8 | Steady |
| 9 | Canada | 6551 | 9 | Steady |
| 10 | (United Kingdom) Great Britain | 6310 | 10 | Steady |

=== Number one ranked riders and nations ===
The following is a list of riders who and nations which have achieved the number one position:

Number 1 ranked individuals
| No. | Rider | Team | Start week | End week | Weeks | Total |
|---|---|---|---|---|---|---|
| 1 | Marianne Vos (NED) | DSB Bank - Nederland bloeit Nederland bloeit Nederland bloeit Rabobank Women Cycling Team | March 2, 2009 | August 18, 2013 | 233^{↑} | 233 |
| 2 | Emma Johansson (SWE) | Orica–AIS | August 25, 2013 | August 8, 2014 | 49 | 49 |
| | Marianne Vos (NED) (2) | Rabobank-Liv Woman Cycling Team | August 15, 2014 | June 21, 2015 | 44 | 277 |
| 3 | Lizzie Armitstead (GBR) | Boels–Dolmans | June 28, 2015 | July 21, 2015 | 3 | 3 |
| 4 | Anna van der Breggen (NED) | Rabobank-Liv Woman Cycling Team | July 26, 2015 | April 10, 2016 | 37 | 37 |
| | Emma Johansson (SWE) (2) | Wiggle High5 | April 17, 2016 | June 26, 2016 | 10 | 59 |
| 5 | Megan Guarnier (USA) | Boels–Dolmans | July 3, 2016 | March 12, 2017 | 38 | 38 |
| 6 | Elisa Longo Borghini (ITA) | Wiggle High5 | March 19, 2017 | April 16, 2017 | 5 | 5 |
| | Anna van der Breggen (NED) (2) | Boels–Dolmans | April 23, 2017 | July 31, 2017 | 15 | 52 |
| 7 | Annemiek van Vleuten (NED) | Orica–Scott; Mitchelton–Scott | August 7, 2017 | February 25, 2018 | 30 | 30 |
| | Anna van der Breggen (NED) (3) | Boels–Dolmans | March 4, 2018 | July 8, 2018 | 19 | 71 |
| | Annemiek van Vleuten (NED) (2) | Mitchelton–Scott | July 15, 2018 | August 5, 2018 | 4 | 34 |
| | Anna van der Breggen (NED) (4) | Boels–Dolmans | August 12, 2018 | August 19, 2018 | 2 | 73 |
| | Annemiek van Vleuten (NED) (3) | Mitchelton–Scott | August 26, 2018 | September 16, 2018 | 4 | 38 |
| | Marianne Vos (NED) (3) | WaowDeals Pro Cycling | September 23, 2018 | September 23, 2018 | 1 | 278^{↑} |
| | Annemiek van Vleuten (NED) (4) | Mitchelton–Scott | September 30, 2018 | January 6, 2019 | 15 | 53 |
| | Anna van der Breggen (NED) (5) | Boels–Dolmans | January 13, 2019 | February 24, 2019 | 7 | 80 |
| | Annemiek van Vleuten (NED) (5) | Mitchelton–Scott | March 3, 2019 | August 25, 2019 | 25 | 78 |
| 8 | Lorena Wiebes (NED) | Parkhotel Valkenburg | September 1, 2019 | March 17, 2020 | 29 | 29 |
| — | UCI World Ranking frozen due to COVID-19 | | March 24, 2020 | July 28, 2020 | 19 | 19 |
| | Annemiek van Vleuten (NED) (6) | Mitchelton–Scott | August 4, 2020 | September 29, 2020 | 9 | 87 |
| | Anna van der Breggen (NED) (6) | Boels–Dolmans | October 6, 2020 | February 23, 2021 | 23 | 103 |
| | Elisa Longo Borghini (ITA) (2) | Trek–Segafredo | February 23, 2021 | March 2, 2021 | 1 | 6 |
| | Anna van der Breggen (NED) (7) | SD Worx | March 2, 2021 | March 23, 2021 | 3 | 106 |
| | Elisa Longo Borghini (ITA) (3) | Trek–Segafredo | March 23, 2021 | May 25, 2021 | 9 | 15 |
| | Annemiek van Vleuten (NED) (7) | Movistar Team | May 25, 2021 | June 29, 2021 | 5 | 92 |
| | Anna van der Breggen (NED) (8) | SD Worx | June 29, 2021 | July 27, 2021 | 4 | 110 |
| | Annemiek van Vleuten (NED) (8) | Movistar Team | July 27, 2021 | October 4, 2022 | 62 | 154 |
| | Lorena Wiebes (NED) (2) | Team DSM | October 4, 2022 | October 11, 2022 | 1 | 30 |
| | Annemiek van Vleuten (NED) (9) | Movistar Team | October 11, 2022 | April 4, 2023 | 25 | 179 |
| | Lorena Wiebes (NED) (3) | SD Worx | April 4, 2023 | May 9, 2023 | 5 | 35 |
| 9 | Demi Vollering (NED) | SD Worx | May 9, 2023 | May 16, 2023 | 1 | 1 |
| | Lorena Wiebes (NED) (4) | SD Worx | May 16, 2023 | May 30, 2023 | 2 | 37 |
| | Demi Vollering (NED) (2) | SD Worx | May 30, 2023 | April 23, 2024 | 47 | 48 |
| 10 | Lotte Kopecky (BEL) | Team SD Worx–Protime | April 23, 2024 | May 7, 2024 | 3 | 3 |
| | Demi Vollering (NED) (3) | Team SD Worx–Protime | May 7, 2024 | May 28, 2024 | 4 | 52 |
| | Lotte Kopecky (BEL) (2) | Team SD Worx–Protime | May 28, 2024 | March 11, 2025 | 41 | 44 |
| | Demi Vollering (NED) (4) | FDJ–Suez | March 11, 2025 | September 16 2025 | 25 | 77 |
| | Lorena Wiebes (NED) (5) | Team SD Worx–Protime | September 16, 2025 | October 7, 2025 | 3 | 40 |
| | Demi Vollering (NED) (5) | FDJ–Suez | October 7, 2025 | March 17, 2026 | 23 | 95 |
| | Lorena Wiebes (NED) (6) | Team SD Worx–Protime | March 17, 2026 | March 31, 2026 | 2 | 42 |
| | Demi Vollering (NED) (6) | FDJ United–Suez | March 31, 2026 | as of 18 August 2026 | 20 | 114 |
Number 1 ranked nations
| No. | Nation | | Start week | End week | Weeks | Total |
| 1 | Germany | | January 9, 2009 | July 26, 2009 | 28 | 28 |
| 2 | Netherlands | | August 2, 2009 | August 8, 2009 | 1 | 1 |
| | Germany (2) | | August 15, 2009 | September 6, 2009 | 3 | 31 |
| | Netherlands (2) | | September 6, 2009 | March 17, 2020 | 550^{↑} | 551 |
| — | Ranking frozen | | March 24, 2020 | July 28, 2020 | 19 | 19 |
| | Netherlands (3) | | August 4, 2020 | as of 18 August, 2026 | 315 | 855^{↑} |

Key
| ^{↑} | Record |

As of 18 August 2026

==== Teams ====
A ranking for teams was also previously provided on a rolling basis, but was replaced with an annual ranking for the 2021 season.

Number 1 ranked teams (rolling)
| No. | Team | Start week | End week | Weeks | Total |
|---|---|---|---|---|---|
| 1 | Team Columbia–High Road Women | January 9, 2009 | July 26, 2009 | 28 | 28 |
| 2 | Cervélo TestTeam | August 2, 2009 | August 9, 2009 | 1 | 1 |
| | Team Columbia–High Road Women (2) | August 15, 2009 | August 31, 2009 | 2 | 30 |
| | Cervélo TestTeam (2) | September 6, 2009 | January 3, 2011 | 70 | 71 |
| | High Road Women (3) | January 10, 2011 | June 22, 2011 | 23 | 53 |
| 3 | Nederland bloeit (2011); Rabobank Women Cycling Team (2012); Rabobank-Liv Giant (2013) | June 29, 2011 | September 15, 2013 | 116 | 116 |
| 4 | Orica–AIS | September 22, 2013 | 3 January 2014 | 15 | 15 |
| | Rabobank-Liv Woman Cycling Team (2) | January 10, 2014 | January 10, 2016 | 104 | 220 |
| 5 | Wiggle High5 | January 17, 2016 | March 6, 2016 | 7 | 7 |
| | Rabobank-Liv Woman Cycling Team (3) | March 13, 2016 | March 27, 2016 | 2 | 222 |
| | Wiggle High5 (2) | April 3, 2016 | May 15, 2016 | 6 | 13 |
| 6 | Boels–Dolmans | May 22, 2016 | September 16, 2018 | 122^{↑} | 122 |
| | Mitchelton–Scott (2) | September 23, 2018 | September 30, 2018 | 2 | 17 |
| | Boels–Dolmans (2) | October 7, 2018 | April 7, 2019 | 27 | 149 |
| | Mitchelton–Scott (3) | April 14, 2019 | May 19, 2019 | 6 | 23 |
| | Boels–Dolmans (3) | May 26, 2019 | January 12, 2020 | 34 | 182 |
| | Mitchelton–Scott (4) | January 19, 2020 | January 26, 2020 | 2 | 25 |
| 7 | Team Sunweb | February 2, 2020 | March 17, 2020 | 7 | 7 |
| — | Ranking frozen | March 24, 2020 | July 28, 2020 | 19 | 19 |
| | Mitchelton–Scott (5) | August 4, 2020 | August 25, 2020 | 4 | 29 |
| 8 | Trek–Segafredo | September 1, 2020 | November 10, 2020 | 11 | 11 |
| 9 | Matrix Fitness Pro Cycling | February 2, 2021 | February 9, 2021 | 1 | 1 |
| | Team BikeExchange (6) | February 9, 2021 | March 2, 2021 | 3 | 32 |
| | SD Worx (4) | March 9, 2021 | October 31, 2021 | 34 | 216 |
| 10 | Thailand Women's Cycling Team | January 18, 2022 | February 15, 2022 | 4 | 4 |
| 11 | FDJ Nouvelle-Aquitaine Futuroscope | February 22, 2022 | March 1, 2022 | 1 | 1 |
| 12 | Movistar Team | March 1, 2022 | March 8, 2022 | 1 | 1 |
| | SD Worx (5) | March 8, 2022 | October 25, 2022 | 33 | 249 |
| 13 | Team Illuminate | October 25, 2022 | November 15, 2022 | 3 | 3 |
| 14 | Valcar–Travel & Service | November 15, 2022 | January 17, 2023 | 9 | 9 |
| | FDJ–Suez (2) | January 17, 2023 | February 14, 2023 | 4 | 5 |
| | Trek–Segafredo (2) | February 14, 2023 | April 4, 2023 | 7 | 18 |
| | SD Worx (6) | April 4, 2023 | October 17, 2023 | 28 | 277 |
| | Movistar Team (2) | January 2, 2024 | January 9, 2024 | 1 | 2 |
| | Liv AlUla Jayco (7) | January 9, 2024 | January 16, 2024 | 1 | 33 |
| 15 | AG Insurance–Soudal | January 16, 2024 | February 13, 2024 | 4 | 4 |
| | Liv AlUla Jayco (8) | February 13, 2024 | March 5, 2024 | 3 | 36 |
| | Team SD Worx–Protime (6) | March 5, 2024 | April 2, 2024 | 4 | 281 |
| | Lidl–Trek (3) | April 2, 2024 | April 16, 2024 | 2 | 20 |
| | Team SD Worx–Protime (7) | April 16, 2024 | October 20, 2024 | 27 | 308 |
| 16 | Colombia Potencia de la Vida–Strongman | November 26, 2024 | January 14, 2025 | 7 | 7 |
| | Liv AlUla Jayco (9) | January 14, 2025 | January 21, 2025 | 1 | 37 |
| 17 | EF Education–Oatly | January 21, 2025 | January 28, 2025 | 1 | 1 |
| | Liv AlUla Jayco (10) | January 28, 2025 | February 4, 2025 | 1 | 38 |
| 18 | UAE Team ADQ | February 4, 2025 | April 8, 2025 | 9 | 9 |
| | Team SD Worx–Protime (8) | April 8, 2025 | May 27, 2025 | 7 | 315^{↑} |
| | FDJ–Suez (3) | May 27, 2025 | Januyary 20, 2026 | 34 | 39 |
| | UAE Team ADQ (2) | January 20, 2026 | June 9, 2026 | 20 | 29 |
| | FDJ United–Suez (4) | June 9, 2026 | as of 18 August 2026 | 10 | 49 |

Annual Team Rankings
| Year | First | Points | Second | Points | Third | Points |
|---|---|---|---|---|---|---|
| 2021 | SD Worx | 12389.99 | Trek–Segafredo | 9158.66 | Team BikeExchange | 9067.66 |

== Year-end rankings ==
The following is a list of top ranked elite riders, team and nation at the end of each season:

| Year | Top-ranked individual | Second-ranked individual | Third-ranked individual | Top-ranked team | Top-ranked nation |
|---|---|---|---|---|---|
| 1994 | Monica Valvik (NOR) | | | No UCI Women's teams | |
| 1995 | Jeannie Longo-Ciprelli (FRA) | | | No UCI Women's teams | |
| 1996 | Jeannie Longo-Ciprelli (FRA) | | | No UCI Women's teams | |
| 1997 | Hanka Kupfernagel (GER) | | | No UCI Women's teams | Germany |
| 1998 | Diana Žiliūtė (LTU) | | | No UCI Women's teams | Lithuania |
| 1999 | Hanka Kupfernagel (GER); The Greenery Hawk Team | Anna Wilson (AUS); Saturn Cycling Team | Diana Žiliūtė (LTU) | Saturn Cycling Team | Germany |
| 2000 | Diana Žiliūtė (LTU); Acca Due O–Lorena Camicie | Hanka Kupfernagel (GER); TBU | Anna Wilson (AUS); Saturn Cycling Team | Acca Due O–Lorena Camicie | Netherlands |
| 2001 | Anna Millward (AUS); Saturn Cycling Team | Judith Arndt (GER) | Mirjam Melchers (NED); ADO | Saturn Cycling Team | Germany |
| 2002 | Susanne Ljungskog (SWE); Vlaanderen–T-Interim Ladies Team | Mirjam Melchers (NED); FAR | Nicole Brändli (SUI); ADO | Saturn Cycling Team | Germany |
| 2003 | Susanne Ljungskog (SWE); BIK–Powerplate | Mirjam Melchers (NED); FAR | Judith Arndt (GER); Equipe Nürnberger Versicherung | BIK–Powerplate | Germany |
| 2004 | Judith Arndt (GER); Equipe Nürnberger Versicherung | Mirjam Melchers (NED); FAR | Oenone Wood (AUS) | Equipe Nürnberger Versicherung | Germany |
| 2005 | Oenone Wood (AUS); Equipe Nürnberger Versicherung | Susanne Ljungskog (SWE); Buitenpoort - Flexpoint Team | Judith Arndt (GER); Equipe Nürnberger Versicherung | Equipe Nürnberger Versicherung | Germany |
| 2006 | Nicole Cooke (GBR); Univega Pro Cycling Team | Marianne Vos (NED); Team DSB Bank | Susanne Ljungskog (SWE); Buitenpoort - Flexpoint Team | Univega Pro Cycling Team | Germany |
| 2007 | Marianne Vos (NED); Team DSB Bank | Nicole Cooke (GBR); Raleigh Lifeforce Creation HB Pro Cycling Team | Judith Arndt (GER); T-Mobile Women | T-Mobile Women | Germany |
| 2008 | Marianne Vos (NED); Team DSB Bank | Judith Arndt (GER); Team Columbia Women | Ina Teutenberg (GER); Team Columbia Women | Team Columbia Women | Germany |
| 2009 | Marianne Vos (NED); Team DSB Bank | Kirsten Wild (NED); Cervelo Test Team | Emma Johansson (SWE); Red Sun Cycling Team | Cervélo TestTeam | Netherlands |
| 2010 | Marianne Vos (NED); Nederland Bloeit | Judith Arndt (GER); HTC Columbia Women | Kirsten Wild (NED); Cervelo Test Team | Cervélo TestTeam | Netherlands |
| 2011 | Marianne Vos (NED); Nederland Bloeit | Emma Johansson (SWE); Hitec Products–UCK | Judith Arndt (GER); HTC–Highroad Women | Nederland Bloeit | Netherlands |
| 2012 | Marianne Vos (NED); Rabobank Women Cycling Team | Judith Arndt (GER); Orica–AIS | Emma Johansson (SWE); Hitec Products–Mistral Home Cycling Team | Rabobank Women Cycling Team | Netherlands |
| 2013 | Emma Johansson (SWE); Orica–AIS | Marianne Vos (NED); Rabobank-Liv Giant | Ellen van Dijk (NED); Specialized–lululemon | Orica–AIS | Netherlands |
| 2014 | Marianne Vos (NED); Rabobank-Liv Woman Cycling Team | Emma Johansson (SWE); Orica–AIS | Lizzie Armitstead (GBR); Boels–Dolmans | Rabobank-Liv Woman Cycling Team | Netherlands |
| 2015 | Anna van der Breggen (NED); Rabobank-Liv Woman Cycling Team | Lizzie Armitstead (GBR); Boels–Dolmans | Jolien D'Hoore (BEL); Wiggle–Honda | Rabobank-Liv Woman Cycling Team | Netherlands |
| 2016 | Megan Guarnier (USA); Boels–Dolmans | Anna van der Breggen (NED); Rabobank-Liv Woman Cycling Team | Emma Johansson (SWE); Wiggle High5 | Boels–Dolmans | Netherlands |
| 2017 | Annemiek van Vleuten (NED); Orica–Scott | Anna van der Breggen (NED); Boels–Dolmans | Marianne Vos (NED); WM3 Energie | Boels–Dolmans | Netherlands |
| 2018 | Annemiek van Vleuten (NED); Mitchelton–Scott | Anna van der Breggen (NED); Boels–Dolmans | Marianne Vos (NED); WaowDeals Pro Cycling | Boels–Dolmans | Netherlands |
| 2019 | Lorena Wiebes (NED); Parkhotel Valkenburg | Marianne Vos (NED); CCC - Liv | Annemiek van Vleuten (NED); Mitchelton–Scott | Boels–Dolmans | Netherlands |
| 2020 | Anna van der Breggen (NED); Boels–Dolmans | Elisa Longo Borghini (ITA); Trek–Segafredo | Annemiek van Vleuten (NED); Mitchelton–Scott | Trek–Segafredo | Netherlands |
| 2021 | Annemiek van Vleuten (NED); Movistar Team | Elisa Longo Borghini (ITA); Trek–Segafredo | Marianne Vos (NED); Team Jumbo–Visma | SD Worx | Netherlands |
| 2022 | Annemiek van Vleuten (NED); Movistar Team | Lorena Wiebes (NED); Team DSM | Elisa Longo Borghini (ITA); Trek–Segafredo | SD Worx | Netherlands |
| 2023 | Demi Vollering (NED); SD Worx | Lotte Kopecky (BEL); SD Worx | Marlen Reusser (SUI); SD Worx | SD Worx | Netherlands |
| 2024 | Lotte Kopecky (BEL); Team SD Worx–Protime | Demi Vollering (NED); Team SD Worx–Protime | Elisa Longo Borghini (ITA); Lidl–Trek | Team SD Worx–Protime | Netherlands |

== Points ==
Points can be earned during stage races and one-day races during year. It depends upon the category of the race how many points could be earned. There are several categories, related to their importance.

- World Cup races (CDM)
- World Championships (CM)
- First category races, divided into two categories:
  - 1.1 category (one day race)
  - 2.1 category (stage race)
- Second category races, divided into two categories:
  - 1.2 category (one day race)
  - 2.2 category (stage race)
- Continental Championships
- National Championships

| Pos. | World Cup | Category 1 | Category 2 |
|---|---|---|---|
| 1 | 100 | 60 | 40 |
| 2 | 75 | 45 | 30 |
| 3 | 55 | 35 | 16 |
| 4 | 45 | 30 | 12 |
| 5 | 38 | 25 | 10 |
| 6 | 32 | 20 | 8 |
| 7 | 26 | 15 | 6 |
| 8 | 22 | 10 | 3 |
| 9 | 18 | 8 | |
| 10 | 15 | 6 | |
| 11 | 12 | 4 | |
| 12 | 10 | 2 | |
| 13 | 8 | | |
| 14 | 6 | | |
| 15 | 4 | | |
| 16 | 3 | | |
| 17 | 2 | | |
| 18 | 1 | | |
Point(s) per stage
| 1 | | 12 | 8 |
| 2 | | 9 | 5 |
| 3 | | 6 | 2 |
| 4 | | 4 | |
| 5 | | 3 | |
| 6 | | 1 | |
Leaders Jersey
| 1 | 10 | 4 | 0 |

Continental Championships
| | Europe and America | | Asia | | Ociania and Africa | |
| Pos. | Road race | Time trial | Road race | Time trial | Road race | Time trial |
|---|---|---|---|---|---|---|
| 1 | 80 | 16 | 60 | 12 | 40 | 8 |
| 2 | 56 | 11 | 40 | 9 | 30 | 5 |
| 3 | 32 | 6 | 27 | 5 | 16 | 2 |
| 4 | 24 | 5 | 20 | 3 | 12 | |
| 5 | 20 | 4 | 15 | | 10 | |
| 6 | 16 | 2 | 10 | | 8 | |
| 7 | 12 | | 9 | | 6 | |
| 8 | 8 | | 5 | | | |
| 9 | 7 | | 3 | | | |
| 10 | 6 | | | | | |
| 11 | 5 | | | | | |
| 12 | 3 | | | | | |

National Championships
| | 1st-10th place | | 11th place and beyond | |
| Pos. | Road race | Time trial | Road race | Time trial |
|---|---|---|---|---|
| 1 | 40 | 8 | 10 | 3 |
| 2 | 30 | 5 | 7 | 2 |
| 3 | 16 | 2 | 5 | |
| 4 | 12 | | 3 | |
| 5 | 10 | | | |
| 6 | 8 | | | |
| 7 | 6 | | | |
| 8 | 3 | | | |

Olympic Games and World Championships
| Pos. | Road race | Time trial |
|---|---|---|
| 1 | 200 | 100 |
| 2 | 170 | 70 |
| 3 | 140 | 40 |
| 4 | 130 | 30 |
| 5 | 120 | 25 |
| 6 | 110 | 20 |
| 7 | 100 | 15 |
| 8 | 90 | 10 |
| 9 | 80 | 9 |
| 10 | 70 | 8 |
| 11 | 60 | 7 |
| 12 | 50 | 6 |
| 13 | 40 | 5 |
| 14 | 30 | 4 |
| 15 | 20 | 3 |
| 16 | 15 | |
| 17 | 10 | |
| 18 | 8 | |
| 19 | 5 | |
| 20 | 3 | |

== See also ==
- UCI Men's road racing world ranking
- UCI Track Cycling World Ranking, track cycling world ranking
