= Tina Liebig =

German cyclist

Personal information
- Born: 28 April 1980 (age 46) Gera, Germany

Cycling career
- Sport: Cycling
- Discipline: Racing
- Role: Rider

Professional teams
- 2006: Equipe Nürnberger Versicherung
- 2009: DSB Bank-LTO

Tina Liebig (born 28 April 1980 in Gera) is a German former professional racing cyclist.

== Career wins ==
1998
UCI Road World Championships, junior road race
2003
Stage 5 Krasna Lipa Tour Féminine (CZE)
2004
General Classification Giro del Trentino Alto Adige - Südtirol (ITA)

1st: Stage 1

2005
General Classification Krasna Lipa Tour Féminine (CZE)
2006 (Equipe Nürnberger Versicherung)
7th World University Cycling Championship, time trial
2009 (DSB Bank-LTO)
