= Emma Rickards =

Australian road cyclist

Personal information
- Born: 17 November 1973 (age 52) Australia

Cycling career
- Sport: Cycling
- Discipline: Road cycling

Professional teams
- 2008: Cervélo Lifeforce Pro Cycling Team
- 2009: Team TIBCO

Emma Rickards (born 17 November 1973) is a road cyclist from Australia. She represented her nation at the 2006, 2007 and 2008 UCI Road World Championships.
