= Luise Keller =

German cyclist

Personal information
- Born: 8 March 1984 (age 42) Jena, East Germany

Cycling career
- Sport: Cycling
- Discipline: Road cycling
- Role: Rider

Professional teams
- 2005–2007: Team Flexpoint
- 2008–2010: Team HTC–Columbia Women

Luise Keller (born 8 March 1984) is a road cyclist from Germany. She represented her nation at the 2005, 2007, 2008, and 2010 UCI Road World Championships.

== See also ==
- 2006 Buitenpoort–Flexpoint Team season
- 2009 Team Columbia–HTC Women season
- 2010 Team HTC–Columbia Women season
