= 2006 in women's road cycling =

== UCI Road World Rankings ==
Top-ranked individual	Second-ranked individual	Third-ranked individual	Top-ranked team	Top-ranked nation
Nicole Cooke (GBR); Univega Pro Cycling Team	Marianne Vos (NED); Team DSB Bank	Susanne Ljungskog (SWE); Buitenpoort - Flexpoint Team	Univega Pro Cycling Team	Germany

== World Championships ==
Race	Date	Winner	Second	Third
World Championship Time Trial	September	Kristin Armstrong (USA)	Karin Thürig (SUI)	Christine Thorburn (USA)
World Championship Road Race	September 23	Marianne Vos (NED)	Trixi Worrack (GER)	Nicole Cooke (GBR)

== UCI World Cup ==
	Date	Race	Winner
#1	26 February	(Australia) Geelong World Cup	Ina-Yoko Teutenberg (GER)
#2	5 March	New Zealand World Cup	Sarah Ulmer (NZL)
#3	2 April	(Belgium) Tour of Flanders for Women	Mirjam Melchers-Van Poppel (NED)
#4	19 April	(Belgium) La Flèche Wallonne Féminine	Nicole Cooke (GBR)
#5	23 April	(Switzerland) Tour de Berne	Zulfiya Zabirova (KAZ)
#6	7 May	(Spain) GP Castilla y León	Nicole Cooke (GBR)
#7	27 May	(Canada) Coupe du Monde Cycliste Féminine de Montréal	Judith Arndt (GER)
#8	28 July	(Sweden) Open de Suède Vårgårda	Susanne Ljungskog (SWE)
#9	30 July	(Denmark) The Ladies Golden Hour	Univega Pro Cycling Team
#10	26 August	(France) GP de Plouay	Nicole Brändli (SUI)
#11	3 September	(Netherlands) Lowland International Rotterdam Tour	Ina-Yoko Teutenberg (GER)
#12	10 September	(Germany) Rund um die Nürnberger Altstadt	Regina Schleicher (GER)

== Single day races (1.1 and 1.2) ==
Race	Date	Cat.	Winner	Second	Third
(Brazil) Copa América de Ciclismo	January 8	1.2	Clemilda Fernandes (BRA)	Rosane Kirch (BRA)	Carla Camargo (BRA)
(Belgium) Omloop Het Volk / Circuit Het Volk	March 12	1.2			
(Italy) Coppa dei Laghi	March 25	1.1			
(Italy) GP Costa Etrusca	March 26	1.2			
(Netherlands) Ronde van Gelderland	April 15	1.2			
(Italy) GP Liberazione	April 25	1.2			
(Switzerland) Souvenir Magali Pache Lausanne	April 30	1.1			
(Netherlands) Omloop van Borsele	May 6	1.2			
(Italy) Trofeo Riviera Della Versilia	May 21	1.2			
(Netherlands) Omloop Door Middag-Humsterland	June 3	1.2			
(Spain) Durango-Durango Emakumen Sarria	June 6	1.2			
(United States) Wachovia Liberty Classic	June 11	1.1			
(Belgium) Flèche Hesbignonne	June 11	1.2			
(Italy) GP Carnevale d'Europa	July 15	1.2			
(Netherlands) Holland Hills Classic	August 6	1.2			
(Germany) Sparkassen Giro	August 13	1.1			
(France) Chrono Champenois – Trophée Européen	September 10	1.1			
(El Salvador) Grand Prix de Santa Ana	October 4	1.2			
(France) Chrono des Nations Les Herbiers Vendée	October 15	1.1			

== Stage races (2.1 and 2.2) ==
Race	Date	Cat.	Winner	Second	Third
(Australia) Geelong Tour	February 21–23	2.2			
Tour of New Zealand	March 1–3	2.2			
(Netherlands) Novilon Internationale Damesronde van Drenthe	April 7–9	2.1			
(Czech Republic) Gracia–Orlová	April 27–30	2.2			
(France) Tour de l'Aude Cycliste Féminin	May 12–21	2.1			
(Canada) Tour du Grand Montréal	May 29 – June 1	2.1			
Giro di San Marino	May 31 – June 2	2.2			
(Poland) Eko Tour Dookola Polski	June 1–4	2.2			
(Spain) Iurreta-Emakumeen Bira	June 8–11	2.1			
(France) Tour cycliste féminin de la Drôme	June 14–17	2.2			
(Netherlands) Rabobank Ster Zeeuwsche Eilanden	June 15–17	2.2			
(Italy) Giro del Trentino Alto Adige-Südtirol	June 15–17	2.1			
(Italy) Giro d'Italia Femminile	June 30 – July 9	2.1			
(Czech Republic) Tour de Feminin – Krásná Lípa	July 6–9	2.2			
(France) Tour de Bretagne Féminin	July 12–16	2.2			
(Germany) International Thüringen Rundfahrt der Frauen	July 18–23	2.1			
(France) Tour Féminin en Limousin	July 21–23	2.2			
Route de France Féminine	August 5–13	2.2			
(France) Trophée d'Or Féminin	August 19–23	2.2			
(Netherlands) Holland Ladies Tour	August 28 – September 2	2.1	Susanne Ljungskog (SWE)	Trixi Worrack (GER)	Judith Arndt (GER)
(France) Tour Cycliste Féminin Ardèche Sud Rhone Alpes	September 5–9	2.2			
(Netherlands) Euregio Ladies Tour	September 5–8	2.2			
(Italy) Giro della Toscana Int. Femminile – Memorial Michela Fanini	September 12–17	2.1			
(El Salvador) Vuelta Ciclista Femenina a el Salvador	September 27 – October 2	2.1			

== World University Cycling Championship ==
Race	Date	Winner	Second	Third
Road race	March 25	Ellen van Dijk (NED)	Eva Lutz (GER)	Ludivine Henrion (BEL)
Individual time trial	March 23	Loes Gunnewijk (NED)	Ellen van Dijk (NED)	Verena Joos (GER)

== Continental Championships ==
=== African Championship ===
Race	Date	Winner	Second	Third
Road race				
Individual time trial				

=== Asian Championships ===
Race	Date	Winner	Second	Third
Road race	September 15	Han Song-Hee (KOR)	Liu Yongli (CHN)	Lee Min-Hye (KOR)
Individual time trial	September 14	Wang Li (CHN)	Lee Min-Hye (KOR)	Satomi Wadami (JPN)

=== European Championships (under-23) ===
Race	Date	Winner	Second	Third
Road race (under-23)		(Netherlands) Marianne Vos	(Italy) Tatiana Guderzo	(Sweden) Monica Holler
Individual time trial (under-23)		(Sweden) Linda Villumsen	(Italy) Tatiana Guderzo	(Italy) Bianca Knoepfle

=== Oceania Championships ===
Race	Date	Winner	Second	Third
Road race				
Individual time trial				

=== Pan-American Championships ===
Race	Date	Winner	Second	Third
Road race	June 4	Yumari González (CUB)	Kori Kelley-Seehafer (USA)	Clemilda Fernandes Silva (BRA)
Individual time trial	June 6	Amber Neben (USA)	Erinne Willock (CAN)	Kori Kelley-Seehafer (USA)
