= Petrogradets =

Russian cycling team

Team information
- UCI code: PTG (2008–2009)
- Registered: Russia (2008–2009)
- Founded: 2008
- Disbanded: 2009 (Merged with Fenixs)
- Discipline: Road
- Status: UCI Women's Team (2008–2009)

Key personnel
- General manager: Andrei Krylov
- Team managers: Igor Kuzentsov; Nikolay Ignatev

Team name history
- 2008–2009: Petrogradets

Petrogradets (UCI team code: PCW) was a Russian professional cycling team, which competed in elite road bicycle racing events such as the UCI Women's Road World Cup. For the 2010 season, the team merged with Fenixs.

== Major wins ==
2008
Stage 5 Gracia–Orlová, Alexandra Burchenkova
Stage 2 Wyscig Etapowy–Zamość, Alexandra Burchenkova

2009
Overall Tour de Feminin - O cenu Ceskeho Svycarska, Alexandra Burchenkova

Stages 1 & 3 (ITT), Alexandra Burchenkova
Stages 4 & 5, Elena Novikova

== National and continental champions ==
2009
Kazakhstan Time Trial, Mariya Slokotovich
Russia Road Race, Yulia Iliynikh
