= Alex Wrubleski =

Canadian cyclist

Personal information
- Full name: Alexandra Wrubleski
- Born: 31 May 1984 (age 42) Regina, Saskatchewan, Canada
- Height: 1.60 m (5 ft 3 in)
- Weight: 55 kg (121 lb)

Cycling career
- Sport: Cycling
- Current team: Retired
- Discipline: Road
- Role: Rider, time-trialist

Professional teams
- 2007: Colavita–Sutter Home
- 2008: Webcor Builders Cycling Team
- 2009: Team Columbia Women
- 2010: Webcor Builders Cycling Team

Major wins
- Canadian Championships (Road) (2006, 2008); Canadian Championships (ITT) (2006); Redlands Bicycle Classic (2008)

Alexandra "Alex" Wrubleski (born 31 May 1984) is a Canadian retired professional road cyclist. She has awarded three Canadian championship titles in both road race and time trial, and later represented her nation Canada at the 2008 Summer Olympics. Wrubleski also raced for the United States' Webcor Builders Cycling Team, before she took a wide sporting break at the end of 2010 season.

== Professional career ==
Wrubleski was born in Regina, Saskatchewan, and attended Dr. Martin LeBoldus High School. She made her sporting debut as an amateur rider, when she joined the Canadian cycling team in 2006, and earned two national titles in the women's road race and time trial. Strong results landed her an official spot on the Colavita–Sutter Home team in 2007, followed by her short stints and participation at the Joe Martin Stage Race and Tri-Peaks Challenge, both held in the United States. In 2008, Wrubleski managed a late surge to recapture the women's road race title at the Canadian Championships in Saint-Georges, Quebec.

Wrubleski qualified for the Canadian squad in all road cycling events at the 2008 Summer Olympics in Beijing by receiving one of the nation's three available berths from the UCI World Cup. In the women's road race, held on the second day of the Games, Wrubleski successfully completed a grueling race with a fiftieth-place effort in 3:39:36, trailing behind Slovenia's Sigrid Corneo by a scanty, seven-second gap. Three days later, in the women's time trial, Wrubleski recorded a sprint time in 39:15.42 to surpass China's Meng Lang on the final stretch for the twenty-fourth spot.

== Career highlights ==
2006
1st Canadian Championships (Road), Canada
1st Canadian Championships (ITT), Canada
2nd Stage 5, Nature Valley Grand Prix, United States
2nd Overall, Tour de Toona, United States

3rd Stage 1, Altoona, Pennsylvania
3rd Stage 3, Altoona, Pennsylvania
3rd Stage 4, Hollidaysburg, Pennsylvania
3rd Stage 6, Altoona, Pennsylvania

2007
2nd Overall, Joe Martin Stage Race, United States

1st Stage 3

2nd Stage 3, Tri-Peaks Challenge, United States
3rd Stage 2, Tri-Peaks Challenge, United States
3rd Stage 6, Tour de l'Ardèche, France
8th UCI World Championships (Road), Stuttgart (GER)
3rd Overall, Nature Valley Grand Prix, United States
2008
1st Canadian Championships (Road), Canada
1st Overall, Redlands Bicycle Classic, United States

1st Stage 4
2nd Stage 2
2nd Stage 3

3rd Canadian Championships (ITT), Canada
9th UCI World Championships (Road), Varese (ITA)
24th Olympic Games (ITT), Beijing (CHN)
50th Olympic Games (Road), Beijing (CHN)
2009 (Team Columbia-HTC 2009 season)
