= Tanja Schmidt-Hennes =

German cyclist (born 1971)

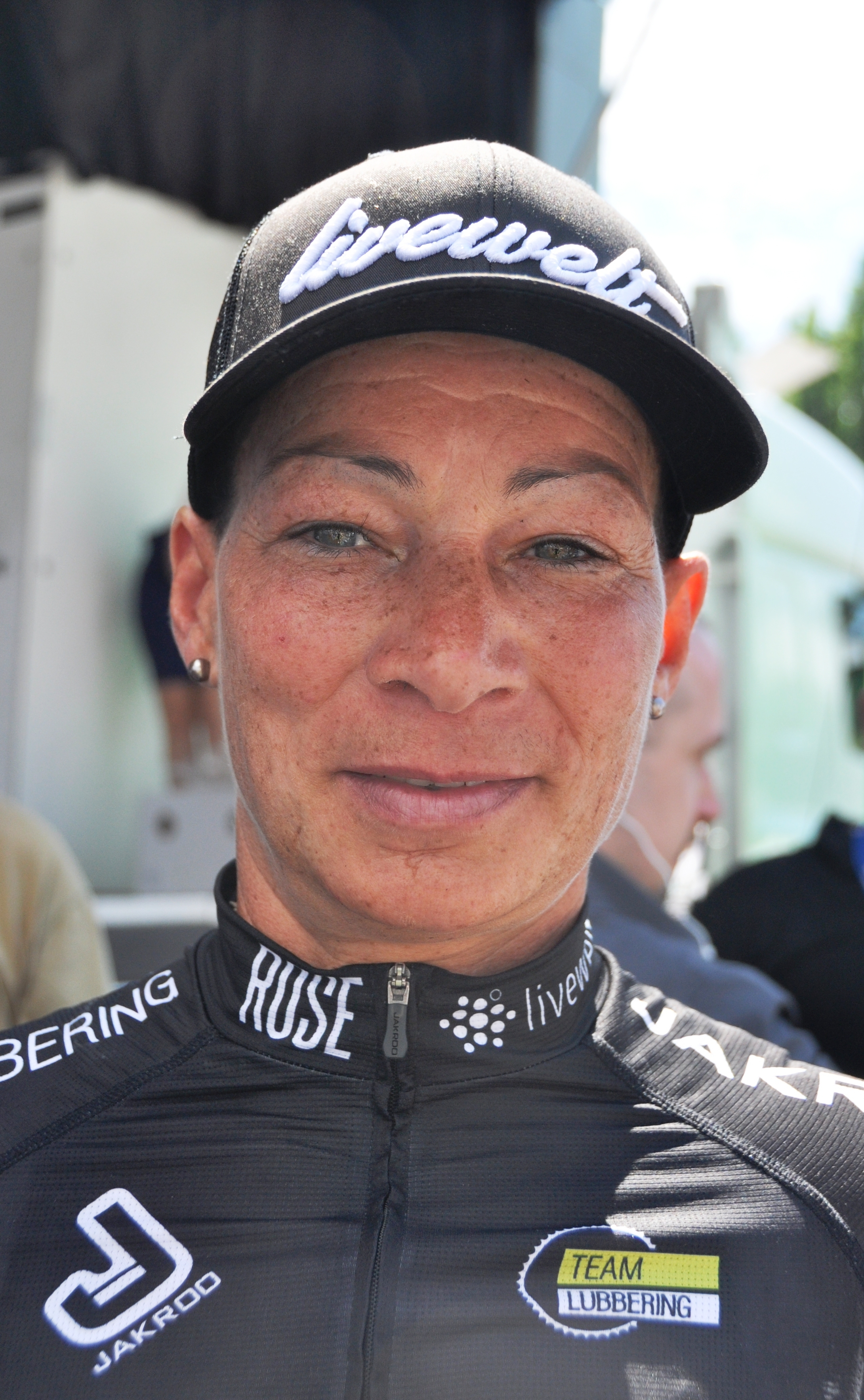
- Tanja Schmidt-Hennes in 2017

Personal information
- Full name: Tanja Schmidt-Hennes
- Born: 30 June 1971 (age 55) Attendorn, West Germany

Cycling career
- Sport: Cycling
- Discipline: Road
- Role: Rider

Professional team
- 2007: Team Flexpoint

Tanja Schmidt-Hennes (born 30 June 1971 in Attendorn) is a former German professional cyclist. She was part of the 2007 Team Flexpoint and the 2008 Team Specialized Designs for Women. She retired in 2009.

== Major results ==
2002
3rd overall Damesronde van Drenthe

2004
3rd Lowland International Rotterdam Tour

2005
2nd Ronde van Gelderland
1st 1st stage Eko Tour Dookola Polski
2nd German National Road Race Championship, Elite
1st 4th stage (B) Holland Ladies Tour
1st overall Holland Ladies Tour

2006 (Buitenpoort–Flexpoint Team)
1st 3rd stage Trophée d'Or Féminin
3rd Omloop Het Volk
2nd Ronde van Gelderland
2nd Sparkassen Giro
2nd Lowland International Rotterdam Tour

2008
5th Omloop Het Volk
