= Sigrid Corneo =

Slovenian cyclist (born 1971)

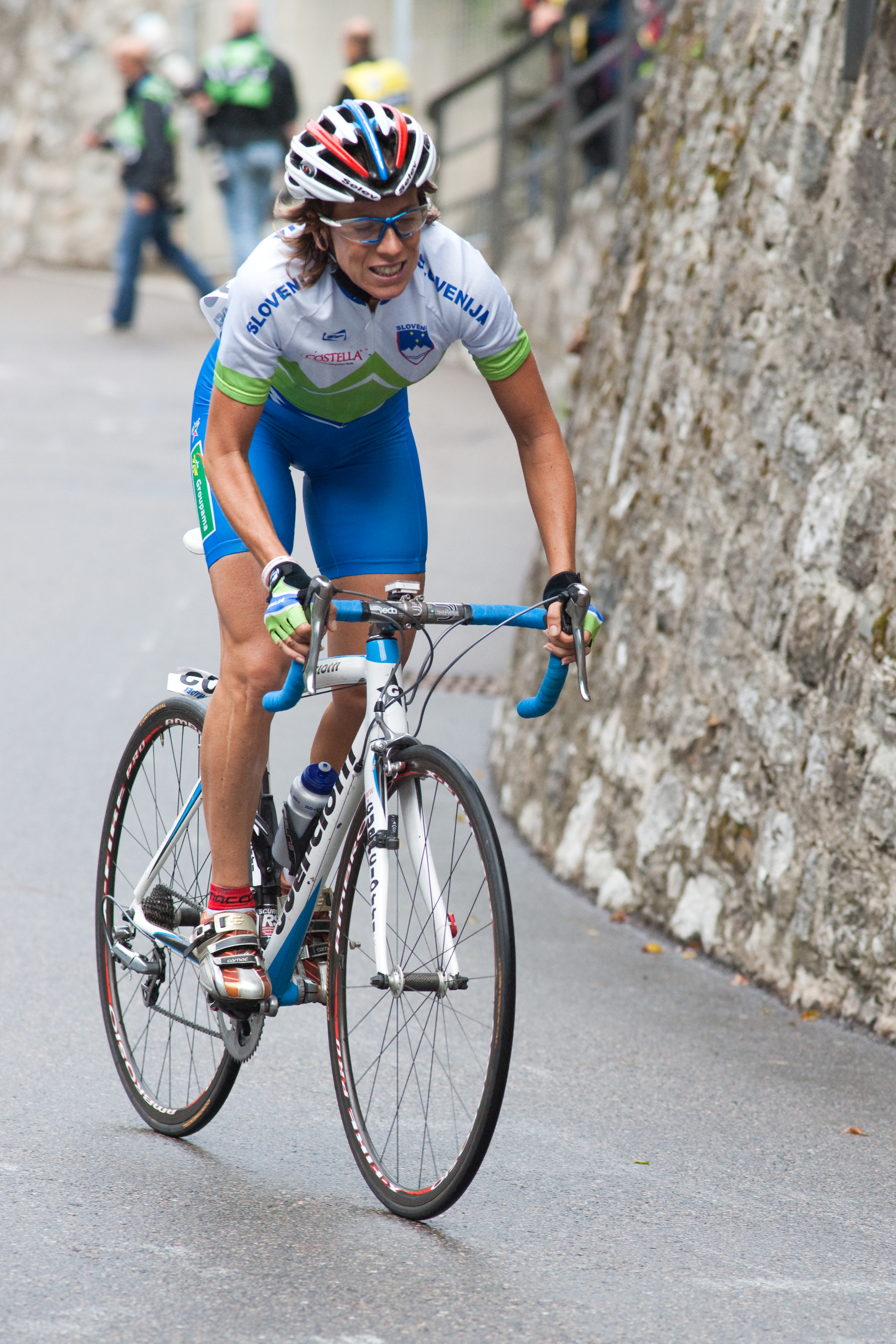
- Sigrid Corneo at the 2009 UCI World Championships

Personal information
- Full name: Sigrid Teresa Corneo
- Born: 27 April 1971 (age 55) Lecco, Italy
- Height: 1.76 m (5 ft 9 in)
- Weight: 54 kg (119 lb)

Cycling career
- Sport: Cycling
- Current team: Retired
- Discipline: Road
- Role: Rider

Professional teams
- 1999: SC Masters Automazione Moltene Record
- 2000–2001: Carpe Diem
- 2002: Itera
- 2003: Road Runner Guerciotti
- 2004–2006: Nobili Rubinetterie
- 2007–2009: Menikini – Selle Italia
- 2010: Top Girls Fassa Bortolo

Sigrid Teresa Corneo (born 27 April 1971) is a retired Slovenian professional road cyclist of Italian descent. Holding a dual citizenship, she represented her nation Slovenia, as a 37-year-old, at the 2008 Summer Olympics, and has mounted second-place finishes in both road race and time trial at the Slovenian Championships in 2010. Before her official retirement from competitive cycling in 2010, Corneo rode for Italy's Top Girls Fassa Bortolo pro cycling team in the women's elite professional events.

Corneo qualified for the Slovenian squad in the women's road race at the 2008 Summer Olympics in Beijing by receiving a single berth from the UCI World Cup. She successfully completed a grueling race with a forty-ninth-place effort in 3:39:29, surpassing Canadian rider Alex Wrubleski by exactly seven seconds.

== Career highlights ==
2004
3rd Vuelta Ciclista Feminina a El Salvador (Road), El Salvador

2nd Stage 3

2005
3rd Vuelta Ciclista Feminina a El Salvador (Road), El Salvador

1st Stage 4

3rd Stage 4, Tour Féminin en Limousin, Rochechouart (FRA)
4th Stage 1, Tour Féminin en Limousin, Dun-le-Palestel (FRA)
8th Stage 3a, Tour Féminin en Limousin, Chaptelat (FRA)
2006
2nd Overall, Grand Prix International de Dottignies, Belgium
2nd Stage 2, Giro d'Italia Femminile, Formello (ITA)
3rd Stage 4, Tour du Grand Montréal, Canada
3rd Stage 8, Giro d'Italia Femminile, Fossano (ITA)
2007
2nd Overall, Tour Féminin en Limousin, France

1st Stage 2, Saint-Sulpice-le-Guérétois

3rd Stage 3, Tour de l'Ardèche, Cruas (FRA)
2008
3rd Stage 4, Tour Féminin en Limousin, Sainte-Feyre (FRA)
49th Olympic Games (Road), Beijing (CHN)
2009
6th Overall, Route de France Féminine, France

5th Stage 4, Saint-Pourçain-sur-Sioule

2010
2nd Slovenian Championships (Road), Ptuj (SLO)
2nd Slovenian Championships (ITT), Plave (SLO)
