= Team Specialized Designs for Women =

Team information
- UCI code: TSW
- Registered: Switzerland
- Founded: 2007
- Disbanded: 2008
- Discipline: Road
- Status: UCI Women's Team

Key personnel
- General manager: Roger Rueegg
- Team manager: Roger Rueegg

Team name history
- 2007 2008: Team Specialized Designs for Women; Specialized Designs for Women

Team Specialized Designs for Women (UCI Code: TSW) was an elite women's professional road bicycle racing team licensed in Switzerland that competed in national events (NE), UCI-rated events (2.HC, 2.1, 2.2, 1.HC, 1.1 and 1.2) and UCI Women's Road World Cup (WC) events. After operating under various names for seven years, it disbanded at the end of the 2008 season.

== Major wins ==
2007
Schönaich, Emma Pooley
Merdingen, Sarah Grab
Stage 6 U6 Cycle Tour Tidaholm, Catrine Josefsson
Stage 3 Thüringen-Rundfahrt der Frauen, Emma Pooley
Wädenswil Cyclo-cross, Katrin Leumann
Steinmaur Cyclo-cross, Katrin Leumann
Sion Cyclo-cross, Katrin Leumann
Dagmersellen Cyclo-cross, Katrin Leumann
2008
Rounds 1, 2 & 3 Perth Criterium Series, Emma Pooley
Ahrweiler, Tanja Schmidt-Hennes
Trofeo Alfredo Binda-Comune di Cittiglio, Emma Pooley
Köln – Schuld – Frechen, Mirjam Hauser-Senn
Refrath, Tanja Schmidt-Hennes
Diessenhofen, Mirjam Hauser-Senn
Overall Tour de Bretagne, Emma Pooley
Stages 3 & 4a Tour de Bretagne
Hameln – Stadthagen, Tanja Schmidt-Hennes
Rhede, Tanja Schmidt-Hennes
Witten, Tanja Schmidt-Hennes
Nettetal, Tanja Schmidt-Hennes
Stage 4 Tour de l'Ardèche, Emma Pooley
Schaan, Sarah Grab
Kärlich, Tanja Schmidt-Hennes

== National champions ==
2007
Swiss National Cyclo-cross Championship, Katrin Leumann

== 2008 team roster ==
Ages as of 1 January 2008.

Rider	Date of birth
Daniela Della Torre (SUI)	March 3, 1986 (aged 21)
Monika Furrer (SUI)	August 6, 1985 (aged 22)
Sarah Grab (SUI)	July 13, 1979 (aged 28)
Mirjam Hauser-Senn (SUI)	September 9, 1980 (aged 27)
Karina Hegelund (DEN)	June 1, 1989 (aged 18)
Tanja Hennes (GER)	June 30, 1971 (aged 36)

Rider	Date of birth
Andrea Knecht (SUI)	October 20, 1983 (aged 24)
Kristen LaSasso (USA)	August 19, 1975 (aged 32)
Lee Min-Hye (KOR)	October 11, 1985 (aged 22)
Emma Pooley (GBR)	October 3, 1982 (aged 25)
Larssyn Rueegg (USA)	May 8, 1985 (aged 22)
