= Kori Kelley-Seehafer =

American cyclist

Personal information
- Born: April 30, 1975 (age 51) United States

Cycling career
- Sport: Cycling
- Discipline: Road cycling

Professional teams
- 2005: T-Mobile Professional Cycling
- 2008: Menikini-Selle Italia-Master Colors
Medal record
Women's road bicycle racing
Representing United States
Pan American Championships
Silver medal – second place	2006 São Paulo	Road race
Bronze medal – third place	2006 São Paulo	Time trial
Bronze medal – third place	2008 Montevideo	Time trial

Kori Kelley-Seehafer (born April 30, 1975) is a road cyclist from United States. She represented her nation at the 2005 and 2008 UCI Road World Championships.
