= Annette Beutler =

Swiss cyclist

Personal information
- Born: 29 June 1976 (age 50) Heimenschwand, Switzerland

Cycling career
- Sport: Cycling
- Role: Rider

Annette Beutler (born 29 June 1976) is a Swiss professional racing cyclist. She is part of the 2007 Team Flexpoint. She was the Swiss National Road Race champion in 2006.

== Notable results ==
- as of 2004
- 2006 (Buitenpoort–Flexpoint Team)
  - Holland Ladies Tour (1 stage)
  - L'Heure d'Or Féminine (2nd)
  - Switzerland National Road Race Championship (1st)
- 2005
  - Switzerland National Road Race Championship (3rd)
  - Tour du Grand Montréal (1 stage, 2nd overall)
  - Redlands Bicycle Classic (1 stage, 2nd overall)
- 2004
  - Giro d'Italia Femminile (1 stage)
  - Gracia–Orlová (1 stage, 2nd overall)
