= Regina Schleicher =

German cyclist

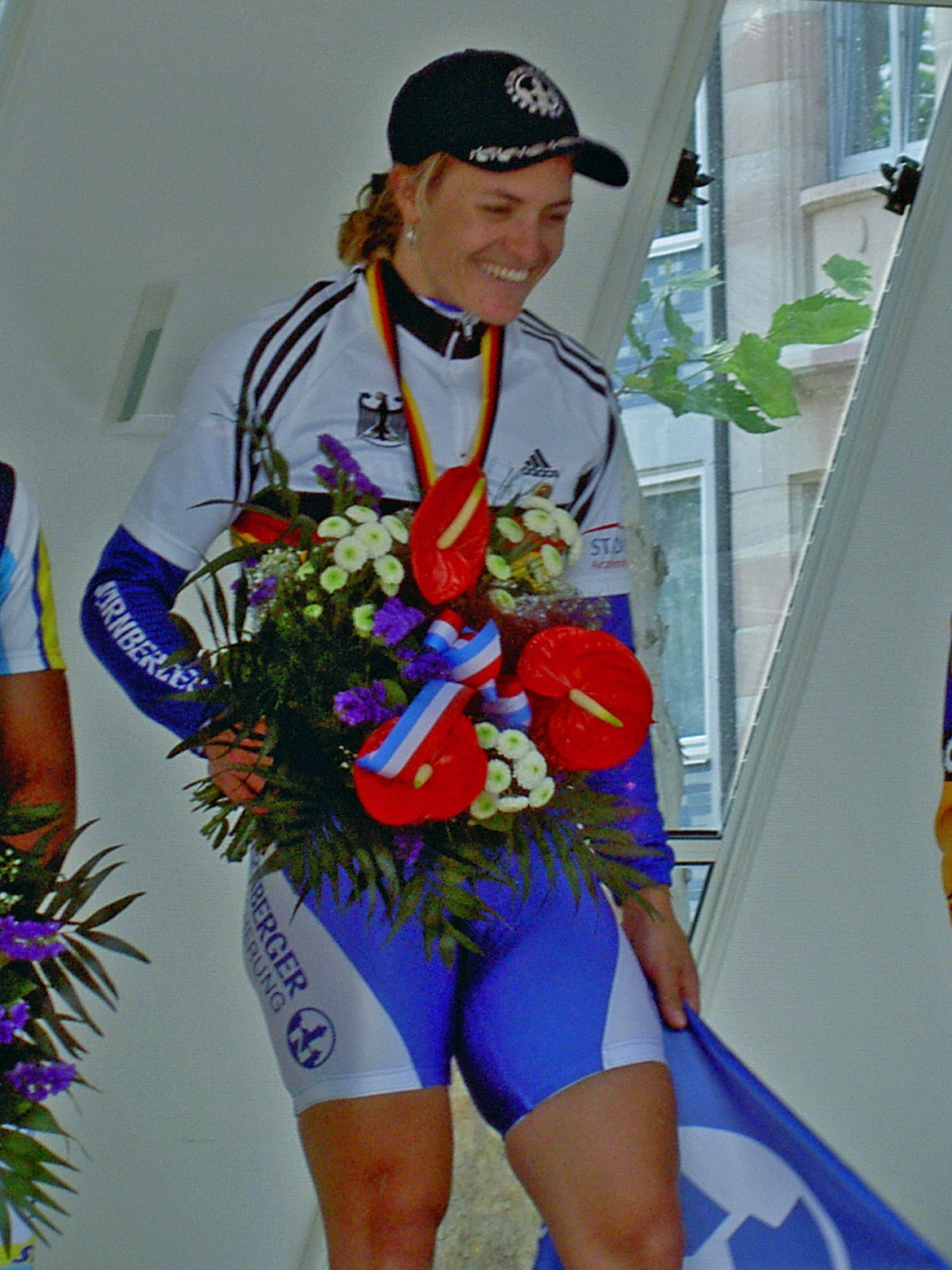
- Schleicher in 2005

Personal information
- Born: 21 March 1974 (age 52) Würzburg, Germany

Cycling career
- Sport: Cycling
- Role: Rider

Professional team
- 2006: Equipe Nürnberger Versicherung

Regina Schleicher (born 21 March 1974 in Würzburg) is a German professional cyclist. She won the road race at the 2005 World Championships.

Whilst young, Regina's family moved to Marktheidenfeld where she attended school. Her father, Hans Schleicher (born 1949) is a cycle racing coach and led her cycling career which began when she competed in the RV Concordia Karbach in Karbach, Lower Franconia.

== Palmarès ==
1994
European U23 Road Race Champion
2002
UCI World Cup Race, Plouay
UCI World Cup Race, Gran Premio Castilla y León
Stage win, Giro d'Italia
2003
4 stage wins, Giro d'Italia
2 stage wins “Canada round travel”
Vuelta Castilla y León
2004
Stage win, Giro d'Italia
Stage win, Giro del Trentino
Stage win, Route OF Montreal
Stage win, Vuelta Castilla y León
Stage win, Holland Ladies Tour
2005
Stage win, Giro d'Italia
Road Race World Champion
German Road Race Champion
2006 (Equipe Nürnberger Versicherung)
Trofeo Alfredo Binda-Comune di Cittiglio
2 stage wins, Holland Ladies Tour
2007
Stage win, Holland Ladies Tour
