= Team Uniqa =

Austrian cycling team

Team information
- UCI code: AAG (2005); UNG (2006–2009)
- Registered: Austria
- Founded: 2005
- Disbanded: 2009
- Discipline: Road
- Status: UCI Women's Team

Team name history
- 2005 2006 2007–2009: Arbö Arkö Graz; Uniqa Graz; Team Uniqa

Team Uniqa (UCI team code: UNG) was an Austrian professional cycling team, which competed in elite road bicycle racing events such as the UCI Women's Road World Cup. For the 2009 season the team merged with fellow Austrian team – Elk Haus.

== Major wins ==
2005
Prologue Tour de l'Aude, Christiane Soeder

2007
Stage 5 Tour de Feminin – Krasna Lip, Monika Schachl

== National champions ==
2007
Austria Road Race, Daniella Pintarelli
France Road Race, Edwige Pitel
2008
Luxembourg Road Race, Nathalie Lamborelle
Austria Road Race, Monika Schachl
