= List of 2008 UCI Women's Teams and riders =

Listed below are the UCI Women's Teams that competed in the 2008 women's road cycling events organized by the International Cycling Union (UCI) including the 2008 UCI Women's Road World Cup.

== Teams overview ==
UCI code	Team name	Country
EHN	Elk Haus	Austria
UNG	Team Uniqa	Austria
LBL	Lotto–Belisol Ladiesteam	Belgium
VLL	Topsport Vlaanderen Thompson Ladies Team	Belgium
POC	Pratomagno Colombia	Colombia
BPD	Bizkaia–Durango	Spain
DKT	Debabarrena–Kirolgi	Spain
ESG	ESGL 93–GSD Gestion	France
TLG	Team Lot-et-Garonne	France
TPF	Team Pro Feminin Les Carroz	France
FUT	Vienne Futuroscope	France
GRT	Swift Racing	United Kingdom
HBH	Team Halfords Bikehut (2008 season)	United Kingdom
NUR	Equipe Nürnberger Versicherung	Germany
TMP	Team High Road Women	Germany
GPC	Giant Pro Cycling	Hong Kong
TFA	Cycling Team–Titanedi–Frezza Acca Due O	Italy
FEN	Fenixs	Italy
GAU	Gauss RDZ Ormu	Italy
MSI	Menikini Selle Italia Master Colors	Italy
MIC	S.C. Michela Fanini Record Rox	Italy
SAF	Safi–Pasta Zara–Manhattan	Italy
DGC	Team Cmax Dila	Italy
TOG	Top Girls Fassa Bortolo Raxy Line	Italy
USC	USC Chirio Forno D'asolo	Italy
AAD	AA-Drink Cycling Team (2008 season)	Netherlands
DSB	Team DSB Bank	Netherlands
FLX	Team Flexpoint (2008 season)	Netherlands
VVP	Vrienden van het Platteland (2008 season)	Netherlands
PAQ	POL–Aqua	Poland
PRI	Primus	Poland
PTG	Petrogradets	Russia
BCT	Bigla Cycling Team	Switzerland
RLT	Cervelo Lifeforce Pro Cycling Team	Switzerland
TSW	Team Specialized Designs for Women	Switzerland
VBR	Verducci Breakaway Racing	United States
WEB	Webcor Builders Cycling Team	United States

== Riders ==
=== AA-Drink Cycling Team ===
- Marlijn Binnendijk (The Netherlands) 12-05-1986
- Chantal Blaak (The Netherlands) 22-10-1989
- Latoya Brulee (Belgium) 09-12-1988
- Paulina Brzeźna-Bentkowska (Poland) 10-09-1981
- Maxime Groenewegen (The Netherlands) 14-07-1988
- Ludivine Henrion (Belgium) 23-01-1984
- Emma Johansson (Sweden) 23-09-1983
- Gabrielle Rovers (The Netherlands) 21-11-1976
- Theresa Senff (Germany) 02-02-1982
- Inge van den Broeck (Belgium) 21-03-1978
- Irene van den Broek (The Netherlands) 26-08-1980
- Laure Werner (Belgium) 22-02-1981
- Kirsten Wild (The Netherlands) 15-10-1982

=== Cycling Team Titanedi-Frezza Acca Due O ===
Ages as of 1 January 2008.

Rider	Date of birth
Alessandra Borchi (ITA)	August 15, 1983 (aged 24)
Giorgia Bronzini (ITA)	August 3, 1983 (aged 24)
Simona Frapporti (ITA)	July 14, 1988 (aged 19)
Gintarė Gaivenytė (LTU)	April 23, 1986 (aged 21)
Eleonora Patuzzo (ITA)	October 16, 1989 (aged 18)

Rider	Date of birth
Svetlana Pauliukaitė (LTU)	July 31, 1985 (aged 22)
Vilija Sereikaitė (LTU)	February 12, 1987 (aged 20)
Eleonora Soldo (ITA)	January 17, 1984 (aged 23)
Marta Tagliaferro (ITA)	November 4, 1989 (aged 18)

=== Elk Haus ===
Ages as of 1 January 2008.

Rider	Date of birth
Martina Růžičková (CZE)	March 22, 1980 (aged 27)
Pelin Cizgin (AUT)	April 29, 1986 (aged 21)
Katarína Uhláriková (SVK)	February 9, 1988 (aged 19)
Katharina Blum (GER)	October 24, 1984 (aged 23)
Stefanie Degle (GER)	October 19, 1986 (aged 21)

Rider	Date of birth
Manuela Grunzweil (AUT)	April 12, 1980 (aged 27)
Chrisabel Prischl (AUT)	September 27, 1983 (aged 24)
Karin Pauer (AUT)	October 10, 1978 (aged 29)
Mette Fischer Andreasen (DEN)	April 13, 1983 (aged 24)
Lisa Maria Degle (GER)	December 21, 1988 (aged 19)

=== POL–Aqua ===
Ages as of 1 January 2008.

Rider	Date of birth
Sylwia Kapusta (POL)	December 8, 1982 (aged 25)
Agnieszka Ryczek (POL)	September 2, 1988 (aged 19)
Małgorzata Jasińska (POL)	January 18, 1984 (aged 23)
Angelika Kulish (POL)	November 29, 1989 (aged 18)
Joanna Ignasiak (POL)	October 14, 1983 (aged 24)

Rider	Date of birth
Natalia Fraczek (POL)	August 30, 1988 (aged 19)
Aleksandra Wnuczek (POL)	May 23, 1986 (aged 21)
Magdalena Zamolska (POL)	April 8, 1985 (aged 22)
Monika Grzebinoga (POL)	March 1, 1985 (aged 22)

=== Primus ===
Ages as of 1 January 2008.

Rider	Date of birth
Ewelina Upas (POL)	December 15, 1984 (aged 23)
Bogumiła Matusiak (POL)	January 24, 1971 (aged 36)
Magdalena Bajerska (POL)	April 1, 1988 (aged 19)
Agnieszka Pietr (POL)	June 24, 1979 (aged 28)
Marzena Wasiuk (POL)	October 20, 1981 (aged 26)

Rider	Date of birth
Katarzyna Barczyk (POL)	September 2, 1987 (aged 20)
Magdalena Grzegorczyk (POL)	February 18, 1988 (aged 19)
Karolina Gryko (POL)	December 26, 1989 (aged 18)
Barbara Gromaszek (POL)	June 23, 1986 (aged 21)

=== Team Flexpoint ===
- (Netherlands) Elisabeth Braam
- (Netherlands) Saskia Elemans
- (Netherlands) Loes Gunnewijk
- (Netherlands) Britt Jochems
- (Netherlands) Jacobien Kanis
- (Germany) Bianca Knöpfle
- (Sweden) Susanne Ljungskog
- (Netherlands) Loes Markerink
- (Netherlands) Mirjam Melchers
- (United States) Amber Neben
- (Denmark) Trine Schmidt
- (Netherlands) Iris Slappendel
- (Netherlands) Adriene Snijder
- (Norway) Anita Valen
- (Netherlands) Suzanne van Veen
- (Netherlands) Elise van Hage

=== Team Halfords Bikehut ===
Ages as of 1 January 2008.

Rider	Date of birth
Nicole Cooke (GBR)	April 13, 1983 (aged 24)
Catherine Hare Willianson (GBR)	March 13, 1982 (aged 25)
Jessica Allen (GBR)	January 12, 1989 (aged 18)
Katie Curtis (GBR)	November 1, 1988 (aged 19)
Tanja Slater (GBR)	May 9, 1978 (aged 29)
Wendy Houvenaghel (GBR)	November 27, 1974 (aged 33)

Rider	Date of birth
Emma Trott (GBR)	December 24, 1989 (aged 18)
Lizzie Armitstead (GBR)	December 18, 1988 (aged 19)
Joanna Rowsell (GBR)	December 5, 1988 (aged 19)
Helen Gaskell (GBR)	January 16, 1983 (aged 24)
Sharon Laws (GBR)	July 7, 1974 (aged 33)
Katie Colclough (Note: Junior rider.) (GBR)	January 20, 1990 (aged 17)

=== Team Lot-et-Garonne ===
Ages as of 1 January 2008.

Rider	Date of birth
Mathilde Boullay (FRA)	April 18, 1985 (aged 22)
Mélanie Bravard (FRA)	April 13, 1987 (aged 20)
Christel Ferrier-Bruneau (FRA)	July 8, 1979 (aged 28)
Kelly Gambier (FRA)	April 7, 1988 (aged 19)
Elodie Henriette (FRA)	May 22, 1987 (aged 20)
Aurore Jeudy (FRA)	October 8, 1983 (aged 24)
Carina Kirssi (FIN)	August 1, 1976 (aged 31)
Emilie Lebrun (FRA)	April 13, 1987 (aged 20)

Rider	Date of birth
Cathy Moncassin Prime (FRA)	June 3, 1977 (aged 30)
Christel Pourias (FRA)	September 21, 1986 (aged 21)
Angelique Saldana (FRA)	July 2, 1986 (aged 21)
Martine Vrignaud (FRA)	November 12, 1986 (aged 21)
Honorine Martin (FRA)	March 5, 1987 (aged 20)
Kathryn Watt (AUS)	September 11, 1964 (aged 43)
Alessia Bugeia (FRA)	September 23, 1987 (aged 20)

=== Team Specialized Designs for Women ===
Ages as of 1 January 2008.

Rider	Date of birth
Daniela Della Torre (SUI)	March 3, 1986 (aged 21)
Monika Furrer (SUI)	August 6, 1985 (aged 22)
Sarah Grab (SUI)	July 13, 1979 (aged 28)
Mirjam Hauser-Senn (SUI)	September 9, 1980 (aged 27)
Karina Hegelund (DEN)	June 1, 1989 (aged 18)
Tanja Hennes (GER)	June 30, 1971 (aged 36)

Rider	Date of birth
Andrea Knecht (SUI)	October 20, 1983 (aged 24)
Kristen LaSasso (USA)	August 19, 1975 (aged 32)
Lee Min-Hye (KOR)	October 11, 1985 (aged 22)
Emma Pooley (GBR)	October 3, 1982 (aged 25)
Larssyn Rueegg (USA)	May 8, 1985 (aged 22)

=== USC Chirio Forno D'asolo ===
- Alyona Andruk (UKR)
- Silvia Borile (ITA)
- Uênia Fernandes (BRA)
- Clemilda Fernandes (BRA)
- Janildes Fernandes (BRA)
- Evelyn García (ESA)
- Tereza Huříková (CZE)
- Urtė Juodvalkytė (LTU)
- Camila Lozano (COL)
- Laura Marotta (ITA)
- Monica Méndez (COL)
- Jolanta Polikevičiūtė (LTU)
- Rasa Polikevičiūtė (LTU)
- Samantha Profumo (ITA)
- Katy Redolini (ITA)
- Elisa Rizzi (ITA)
- Tetyana Styazhkina (UKR)
- Elena Stramoysova (RUS)
- Hanna Talkanitsa (BLR)
- Edita Ungurytė (LTU)

=== Verducci Breakaway Racing ===
Ages as of 1 January 2008.

Rider	Date of birth
Theresa Cliff-Ryan (USA)	June 19, 1978 (aged 29)
Kacey Mandefield (USA)	July 5, 1986 (aged 21)
Megan Esmonde (USA)	January 16, 1982 (aged 25)
Katherine Baker (AUS)	March 4, 1987 (aged 20)
Kele Murdin (USA)	August 15, 1974 (aged 33)

Rider	Date of birth
Lisa Jellett (USA)	January 24, 1974 (aged 33)
Jessie MacLean (AUS)	October 17, 1985 (aged 22)
Tricia Camila (USA)	January 29, 1969 (aged 38)
Andrea Luebbe (USA)	May 17, 1983 (aged 24)

=== Vrienden van het Platteland ===
Ages as of 1 January 2008.

Rider	Date of birth
Liesbeth Bakker (NED)	July 1, 1986 (aged 21)
Martine Bras (NED)	May 17, 1987 (aged 20)
Nikki Butterfield-Egyed (AUS)	April 12, 1982 (aged 25)
Ellen van Dijk (NED)	February 11, 1987 (aged 20)
Lorian Graham (AUS)	November 8, 1977 (aged 30)
Yvonne Hijgenaar (NED)	May 15, 1980 (aged 27)
Marit Huisman (NED)	March 1, 1989 (aged 18)
Willy Kanis (NED)	July 27, 1984 (aged 23)
Roxane Knetemann (NED)	April 1, 1987 (aged 20)

Rider	Date of birth
Kristy Miggels (NED)	August 6, 1980 (aged 27)
Tina Pic (USA)	May 9, 1966 (aged 41)
Martine van der Herberg (NED)	November 24, 1989 (aged 18)
An Van Rie (BEL)	June 9, 1974 (aged 33)
Annemiek van Vleuten (NED)	October 8, 1982 (aged 25)
Monique Verstraten (NED)	April 24, 1983 (aged 24)
Liesbet De Vocht (BEL)	January 5, 1979 (aged 28)
Jaccolien Wallaard (NED)	September 30, 1982 (aged 25)

Guest riders

The team had Felicia Gomez and Linn Torp as guest riders during the Tour of New Zealand and Gomez also during the Geelong Tour.

=== Webcor Builders Cycling Team ===
Ages as of 1 January 2008.

Rider	Date of birth
Christine Thorburn (USA)	September 17, 1969 (aged 38)
Katheryn Curi Mattis (USA)	May 29, 1974 (aged 33)
Amy Dombroski (USA)	September 9, 1987 (aged 20)
Janel Holcomb (USA)	December 2, 1978 (aged 29)
Rebecca Much (USA)	February 25, 1986 (aged 21)

Rider	Date of birth
Erinne Willock (CAN)	October 16, 1981 (aged 26)
Alexandra Wrubleski (CAN)	May 31, 1984 (aged 23)
Gina Grain (CAN)	June 16, 1974 (aged 33)
Laura Yoisten (CAN)	August 10, 1983 (aged 24)

Preceded by 2007	List of UCI Women's Teams; 2008	Succeeded by 2009
