= List of teams and cyclists in the 2026 Tour de France =

List of cyclists

The following is a list of teams and cyclists who participated in the 2026 Tour de France.

== Teams ==
Twenty-three teams took part in the race. All 18 UCI WorldTeams were automatically invited. They will be joined by five UCI ProTeams: the three highest ranked UCI ProTeams in 2025 (Tudor Pro Cycling Team, Pinarello–Q36.5 Pro Cycling Team and Cofidis), along with two teams (Team TotalEnergies and Caja Rural–Seguros RGA) selected by Amaury Sport Organisation (ASO), the organisers of the Tour. The teams were announced on 30 January 2026.

Media noted that Unibet Rose Rockets had expected to be invited, however Caja Rural-Seguros RGA was chosen instead – with Tour de France director Christian Prudhomme explaining that Caja Rural-Seguros RGA had performed well in 2025, including finishing fourth in the team classification at the 2025 Vuelta a España.

=== UCI WorldTeams ===
- Alpecin–Premier Tech
- Decathlon CMA CGM
- EF Education–EasyPost
- Groupama–FDJ United
- Lidl–Trek
- Lotto–Intermarché
- Movistar Team
- Netcompany INEOS
- NSN Cycling Team
- Red Bull–Bora–Hansgrohe
- Soudal–Quick-Step
- Team Bahrain Victorious
- Team Jayco–AlUla
- Team Picnic–PostNL
- UAE Team Emirates XRG
- Uno-X Mobility
- Visma–Lease a Bike
- XDS Astana Team

=== UCI ProTeams ===
- Caja Rural–Seguros RGA
- Cofidis
- Pinarello–Q36.5 Pro Cycling Team
- Team TotalEnergies
- Tudor Pro Cycling Team

== Cyclists ==
Legend
No.	Starting number worn by the rider during the Tour
Pos.	Position in the general classification
Time	Deficit to the winner of the general classification
‡	Denotes riders born on or after 1 January 2001 eligible for the young rider classification
General classification	Denotes the winner of the general classification
Points classification	Denotes the winner of the points classification
Mountains classification	Denotes the winner of the mountains classification
Young rider classification	Denotes the winner of the young rider classification (eligibility indicated by ‡)
Team classification	Denotes riders that represent the winner of the team classification
	Denotes the winner of the super-combativity award
DNS	Denotes a rider who did not start a stage, followed by the stage before which he withdrew
DNF	Denotes a rider who did not finish a stage, followed by the stage in which he withdrew
DSQ	Denotes a rider who was disqualified from the race, followed by the stage in which this occurred
OTL	Denotes a rider finished outside the time limit, followed by the stage in which they did so
Ages correct as of Saturday 4 July 2026, the date on which the Tour begins

=== By starting number ===
No.	Name	Nationality	Team	Age	Pos.	Time
1	Tadej Pogačar	Slovenia	UAE Team Emirates XRG	27	1	76h 56' 26"
2	Isaac del Toro ‡	Mexico	UAE Team Emirates XRG	22	3	+ 9' 42"
3	Felix Großschartner	Austria	UAE Team Emirates XRG	32	32	+ 2h 43' 22"
4	Brandon McNulty	United States	UAE Team Emirates XRG	28	DNF-18	–
5	Nils Politt	Germany	UAE Team Emirates XRG	32	72	+ 4h 23' 30"
6	Florian Vermeersch	Belgium	UAE Team Emirates XRG	27	116	+ 5h 26' 49"
7	Tim Wellens	Belgium	UAE Team Emirates XRG	35	74	+ 4h 25' 28"
8	Adam Yates	Great Britain	UAE Team Emirates XRG	33	21	+ 1h 51' 59"
11	Jonas Vingegaard	Denmark	Visma–Lease a Bike	29	DNF-15	–
12	Edoardo Affini	Italy	Visma–Lease a Bike	30	DNF-19	–
13	Bruno Armirail	France	Visma–Lease a Bike	32	62	+ 4h 03' 26"
14	Victor Campenaerts	Belgium	Visma–Lease a Bike	34	82	+ 4h 34' 17"
15	Per Strand Hagenes ‡	Norway	Visma–Lease a Bike	22	103	+ 5h 07' 45"
16	Matteo Jorgenson	United States	Visma–Lease a Bike	27	30	+ 2h 33' 29"
17	Sepp Kuss	United States	Visma–Lease a Bike	31	13	+ 1h 02' 23"
18	Davide Piganzoli ‡	Italy	Visma–Lease a Bike	23	14	+ 1h 03' 43"
21	Remco Evenepoel	Belgium	Red Bull–Bora–Hansgrohe	26	2	+ 6' 26"
22	Mattia Cattaneo	Italy	Red Bull–Bora–Hansgrohe	35	33	+ 2h 51' 19"
23	Nico Denz	Germany	Red Bull–Bora–Hansgrohe	32	95	+ 4h 52' 16"
24	Jai Hindley	Australia	Red Bull–Bora–Hansgrohe	30	15	+ 1h 23' 28"
25	Florian Lipowitz	Germany	Red Bull–Bora–Hansgrohe	25	DNF-16	–
26	Jan Tratnik	Slovenia	Red Bull–Bora–Hansgrohe	36	83	+ 4h 34' 24"
27	Tim van Dijke	Netherlands	Red Bull–Bora–Hansgrohe	26	111	+ 5h 16' 43"
28	Maxim Van Gils	Belgium	Red Bull–Bora–Hansgrohe	26	27	+ 2h 24' 09"
31	Juan Ayuso ‡	Spain	Lidl–Trek	23	7	+ 17' 48"
32	Derek Gee-West	Canada	Lidl–Trek	31	25	+ 2h 12' 59"
33	Mads Pedersen	Denmark	Lidl–Trek	30	80	+ 4h 33' 05"
34	Quinn Simmons ‡	United States	Lidl–Trek	25	18	+ 1h 35' 28"
35	Mattias Skjelmose	Denmark	Lidl–Trek	25	6	+ 14' 59"
36	Toms Skujiņš	Latvia	Lidl–Trek	35	94	+ 4h 49' 39"
37	Mathias Vacek ‡	Czechia	Lidl–Trek	24	49	+ 3h 34' 36"
38	Carlos Verona	Spain	Lidl–Trek	33	23	+ 2h 05' 22"
41	Richard Carapaz	Ecuador	EF Education–EasyPost	33	8	+ 20' 00"
42	Kasper Asgreen	Denmark	EF Education–EasyPost	31	84	+ 4h 35' 37"
43	Alex Baudin ‡	France	EF Education–EasyPost	25	46	+ 3h 11' 41"
44	Ben Healy	Ireland	EF Education–EasyPost	25	59	+ 3h 51' 03"
45	Sean Quinn	United States	EF Education–EasyPost	26	19	+ 1h 47' 05"
46	Georg Steinhauser ‡	Germany	EF Education–EasyPost	24	113	+ 5h 19' 39"
47	Michael Valgren	Denmark	EF Education–EasyPost	34	53	+ 3h 39' 09"
48	Max Walker ‡	Great Britain	EF Education–EasyPost	24	106	+ 5h 13' 19"
51	Paul Seixas ‡	France	Decathlon CMA CGM	19	4	+ 11' 56"
52	Tiesj Benoot	Belgium	Decathlon CMA CGM	32	17	+ 1h 32' 56"
53	Cees Bol	Netherlands	Decathlon CMA CGM	30	158	+ 6h 22' 08"
54	Daan Hoole	Netherlands	Decathlon CMA CGM	27	130	+ 5h 38' 04"
55	Olav Kooij ‡	Netherlands	Decathlon CMA CGM	24	149	+ 6h 09' 18"
56	Aurélien Paret-Peintre	France	Decathlon CMA CGM	30	42	+ 3h 08' 28"
57	Nicolas Prodhomme	France	Decathlon CMA CGM	29	16	+ 1h 25' 01"
58	Matthew Riccitello ‡	United States	Decathlon CMA CGM	24	24	+ 2h 11' 09"
61	Sergio Higuita	Colombia	XDS Astana Team	28	38	+ 3h 04' 35"
62	Davide Ballerini	Italy	XDS Astana Team	31	152	+ 6h 11' 22"
63	Aaron Gate	New Zealand	XDS Astana Team	35	121	+ 5h 28' 56"
64	Max Kanter	Germany	XDS Astana Team	28	142	+ 5h 55' 29"
65	Harold Tejada	Colombia	XDS Astana Team	29	26	+ 2h 19' 47"
66	Mike Teunissen	Netherlands	XDS Astana Team	33	124	+ 5h 31' 58"
67	Simone Velasco	Italy	XDS Astana Team	30	100	+ 5h 04' 15"
68	Nicolas Vinokurov ‡	Kazakhstan	XDS Astana Team	23	98	+ 5h 01' 12"
71	Lenny Martinez ‡	France	Team Bahrain Victorious	22	5	+ 13' 02"
72	Phil Bauhaus	Germany	Team Bahrain Victorious	31	154	+ 6h 13' 49"
73	Damiano Caruso	Italy	Team Bahrain Victorious	38	55	+ 3h 46' 43"
74	Kamil Gradek	Poland	Team Bahrain Victorious	35	155	+ 6h 16' 12"
75	Matej Mohorič	Slovenia	Team Bahrain Victorious	31	92	+ 4h 44' 30"
76	Robert Stannard	Australia	Team Bahrain Victorious	27	105	+ 5h 13' 12"
77	Antonio Tiberi ‡	Italy	Team Bahrain Victorious	25	37	+ 3h 03' 52"
78	Vlad Van Mechelen ‡	Belgium	Team Bahrain Victorious	22	66	+ 4h 18' 07"
81	Egan Bernal	Colombia	Netcompany INEOS	29	20	+ 1h 47' 58"
82	Thymen Arensman	Netherlands	Netcompany INEOS	26	22	+ 2h 02' 42"
83	Tobias Foss	Norway	Netcompany INEOS	29	43	+ 3h 08' 29"
84	Filippo Ganna	Italy	Netcompany INEOS	29	123	+ 5h 31' 00"
85	Dorian Godon	France	Netcompany INEOS	30	136	+ 5h 46' 54"
86	Michał Kwiatkowski	Poland	Netcompany INEOS	36	110	+ 5h 15' 39"
87	Josh Tarling ‡	Great Britain	Netcompany INEOS	22	120	+ 5h 28' 28"
88	Kévin Vauquelin ‡	France	Netcompany INEOS	25	36	+ 3h 01' 17"
91	Tim Merlier	Belgium	Soudal–Quick-Step	33	DNF-15	–
92	Pascal Eenkhoorn	Netherlands	Soudal–Quick-Step	29	143	+ 5h 57' 18"
93	Valentin Paret-Peintre ‡	France	Soudal–Quick-Step	25	44	+ 3h 09' 21"
94	Jasper Stuyven	Belgium	Soudal–Quick-Step	34	71	+ 4h 22' 49"
95	Dylan van Baarle	Netherlands	Soudal–Quick-Step	34	131	+ 5h 38' 53"
96	Bert Van Lerberghe	Belgium	Soudal–Quick-Step	33	DNF-6	–
97	Ilan Van Wilder	Belgium	Soudal–Quick-Step	26	DNF-20	–
98	Louis Vervaeke	Belgium	Soudal–Quick-Step	32	67	+ 4h 18' 38"
101	Mathieu van der Poel	Netherlands	Alpecin–Premier Tech	31	75	+ 4h 26' 28"
102	Ramses Debruyne ‡	Belgium	Alpecin–Premier Tech	23	DNS-14	–
103	Silvan Dillier	Switzerland	Alpecin–Premier Tech	35	137	+ 5h 48' 36"
104	Tim Marsman	Netherlands	Alpecin–Premier Tech	25	133	+ 5h 43' 11"
105	Jasper Philipsen	Belgium	Alpecin–Premier Tech	28	135	+ 5h 44' 35"
106	Edward Planckaert	Belgium	Alpecin–Premier Tech	31	114	+ 5h 24' 18"
107	Jonas Rickaert	Belgium	Alpecin–Premier Tech	32	115	+ 5h 24' 39"
108	Emiel Verstrynge ‡	Belgium	Alpecin–Premier Tech	24	96	+ 4h 57' 11"
111	Ben O'Connor	Australia	Team Jayco–AlUla	30	28	+ 2h 31' 38"
112	Pascal Ackermann	Germany	Team Jayco–AlUla	32	DNF-20	–
113	Luke Durbridge	Australia	Team Jayco–AlUla	35	107	+ 5h 13' 26"
114	Felix Engelhardt	Germany	Team Jayco–AlUla	25	70	+ 4h 22' 31"
115	Michael Matthews	Australia	Team Jayco–AlUla	35	52	+ 3h 37' 35"
116	Kelland O'Brien	Australia	Team Jayco–AlUla	28	OTL-4	–
117	Luke Plapp	Australia	Team Jayco–AlUla	25	91	+ 4h 44' 30"
118	Mauro Schmid	Switzerland	Team Jayco–AlUla	26	35	+ 2h 53' 29"
121	Tobias Halland Johannessen	Norway	Uno-X Mobility	26	12	+ 56' 37"
122	Jonas Abrahamsen	Norway	Uno-X Mobility	30	77	+ 4h 30' 23"
123	Anthon Charmig	Denmark	Uno-X Mobility	28	OTL-14	–
124	Magnus Cort	Denmark	Uno-X Mobility	33	97	+ 4h 57' 57"
125	Anders Halland Johannessen	Norway	Uno-X Mobility	26	64	+ 4h 14' 42"
126	Anders Skaarseth	Norway	Uno-X Mobility	31	60	+ 4h 03' 07"
127	Torstein Træen	Norway	Uno-X Mobility	30	DNS-7	–
128	Søren Wærenskjold	Norway	Uno-X Mobility	26	138	+ 5h 48' 38"
131	Biniam Girmay	Eritrea	NSN Cycling Team	26	141	+ 5h 54' 20"
132	Lewis Askey ‡	Great Britain	NSN Cycling Team	25	151	+ 6h 10' 48"
133	George Bennett	New Zealand	NSN Cycling Team	36	68	+ 4h 18' 42"
134	Marco Frigo	Italy	NSN Cycling Team	26	78	+ 4h 32' 04"
135	Matis Louvel	France	NSN Cycling Team	26	157	+ 6h 17' 36"
136	Krists Neilands	Latvia	NSN Cycling Team	31	134	+ 5h 43' 58"
137	Jake Stewart	Great Britain	NSN Cycling Team	26	150	+ 6h 10' 47"
138	Tom Van Asbroeck	Belgium	NSN Cycling Team	36	DNF-15	–
141	Cian Uijtdebroeks ‡	Belgium	Movistar Team	23	DNF-6	–
142	Pablo Castrillo ‡	Spain	Movistar Team	25	29	+ 2h 31' 43"
143	Jefferson Alveiro Cepeda	Ecuador	Movistar Team	30	101	+ 5h 04' 42"
144	Raúl García Pierna ‡	Spain	Movistar Team	25	34	+ 2h 52' 32"
145	Michel Hessmann ‡	Germany	Movistar Team	25	104	+ 5h 11' 28"
146	Nelson Oliveira	Portugal	Movistar Team	37	65	+ 4h 17' 56"
147	Javier Romo	Spain	Movistar Team	27	54	+ 3h 41' 49"
148	Einer Rubio	Colombia	Movistar Team	28	DNF-19	–
151	Arnaud De Lie ‡	Belgium	Lotto–Intermarché	24	DNF-3	–
152	Huub Artz ‡	Netherlands	Lotto–Intermarché	24	132	+ 5h 42' 34"
153	Jenno Berckmoes ‡	Belgium	Lotto–Intermarché	25	DNS-13	–
154	Lars Craps ‡	Belgium	Lotto–Intermarché	24	DNS-16	–
155	Liam Slock	Belgium	Lotto–Intermarché	25	128	+ 5h 36' 40"
156	Lennert Van Eetvelt ‡	Belgium	Lotto–Intermarché	24	41	+ 3h 08' 22"
157	Baptiste Veistroffer	France	Lotto–Intermarché	26	146	+ 6h 02' 14"
158	Georg Zimmermann	Germany	Lotto–Intermarché	28	90	+ 4h 44' 21"
161	Ion Izagirre	Spain	Cofidis	37	45	+ 3h 10' 13"
162	Piet Allegaert	Belgium	Cofidis	31	153	+ 6h 12' 22"
163	Alex Aranburu	Spain	Cofidis	30	85	+ 4h 37' 55"
164	Jenthe Biermans	Belgium	Cofidis	30	144	+ 6h 01' 44"
165	Milan Fretin ‡	Belgium	Cofidis	25	148	+ 6h 06' 10"
166	Alex Kirsch	Luxembourg	Cofidis	34	122	+ 5h 30' 05"
167	Hugo Page ‡	France	Cofidis	24	119	+ 5h 27' 56"
168	Benjamin Thomas	France	Cofidis	30	117	+ 5h 27' 05"
171	Tom Pidcock	Great Britain	Pinarello–Q36.5 Pro Cycling Team	26	9	+ 29' 28"
172	Xabier Azparren	Spain	Pinarello–Q36.5 Pro Cycling Team	27	99	+ 5h 02' 54"
173	Chris Harper	Australia	Pinarello–Q36.5 Pro Cycling Team	31	DNS-11	–
174	Quinten Hermans	Belgium	Pinarello–Q36.5 Pro Cycling Team	30	39	+ 3h 05' 23"
175	Damien Howson	Australia	Pinarello–Q36.5 Pro Cycling Team	33	88	+ 4h 41' 38"
176	Xandro Meurisse	Belgium	Pinarello–Q36.5 Pro Cycling Team	34	56	+ 3h 49' 13"
177	Brent Van Moer	Belgium	Pinarello–Q36.5 Pro Cycling Team	28	81	+ 4h 33' 14"
178	Fred Wright	Great Britain	Pinarello–Q36.5 Pro Cycling Team	27	127	+ 5h 36' 21"
181	Romain Grégoire ‡	France	Groupama–FDJ United	23	57	+ 3h 50' 00"
182	Clément Berthet	France	Groupama–FDJ United	28	DNS-2	–
183	Clément Braz Afonso	France	Groupama–FDJ United	26	40	+ 3h 06' 23"
184	Ewen Costiou ‡	France	Groupama–FDJ United	23	79	+ 4h 32' 23"
185	Lorenzo Germani ‡	Italy	Groupama–FDJ United	24	93	+ 4h 48' 18"
186	Guillaume Martin	France	Groupama–FDJ United	33	31	+ 2h 34' 15"
187	Quentin Pacher	France	Groupama–FDJ United	33	58	+ 3h 50' 29"
188	Clément Russo	France	Groupama–FDJ United	31	69	+ 4h 20' 25"
191	Julian Alaphilippe	France	Tudor Pro Cycling Team	34	125	+ 5h 33' 07"
192	Arvid de Kleijn	Netherlands	Tudor Pro Cycling Team	32	DNF-6	–
193	Marco Haller	Austria	Tudor Pro Cycling Team	35	147	+ 6h 02' 20"
194	Marc Hirschi	Switzerland	Tudor Pro Cycling Team	27	48	+ 3h 29' 59"
195	Rick Pluimers	Netherlands	Tudor Pro Cycling Team	25	73	+ 4h 24' 31"
196	Michael Storer	Australia	Tudor Pro Cycling Team	29	63	+ 4h 11' 37"
197	Matteo Trentin	Italy	Tudor Pro Cycling Team	36	DNS-10	–
198	Yannis Voisard	Switzerland	Tudor Pro Cycling Team	27	11	+ 38' 02"
201	Jordan Jegat	France	Team TotalEnergies	27	10	+ 33' 21"
202	Nicolas Breuillard	France	Team TotalEnergies	26	50	+ 3h 34' 36"
203	Joris Delbove	France	Team TotalEnergies	25	51	+ 3h 37' 06"
204	Alexandre Delettre	France	Team TotalEnergies	28	61	+ 4h 03' 16"
205	Thibault Guernalec	France	Team TotalEnergies	28	109	+ 5h 15' 27"
206	Mathis Le Berre ‡	France	Team TotalEnergies	25	76	+ 4h 26' 49"
207	Anthony Turgis	France	Team TotalEnergies	32	108	+ 5h 14' 55"
208	Mattéo Vercher ‡	France	Team TotalEnergies	25	86	+ 4h 38' 44"
211	Warren Barguil	France	Team Picnic–PostNL	34	87	+ 4h 40' 03"
212	Frits Biesterbos ‡	Netherlands	Team Picnic–PostNL	24	DNS-13	–
213	Pavel Bittner ‡	Czechia	Team Picnic–PostNL	23	140	+ 5h 51' 51"
214	John Degenkolb	Germany	Team Picnic–PostNL	37	145	+ 6h 01' 44"
215	Robbe Dhondt ‡	Belgium	Team Picnic–PostNL	22	118	+ 5h 27' 16"
216	Niklas Märkl	Germany	Team Picnic–PostNL	27	139	+ 5h 51' 31"
217	Julius van den Berg	Netherlands	Team Picnic–PostNL	29	156	+ 6h 17' 26"
218	Frank van den Broek	Netherlands	Team Picnic–PostNL	25	102	+ 5h 07' 36"
221	Fernando Gaviria	Colombia	Caja Rural–Seguros RGA	31	DNS-13	–
222	Abel Balderstone	Spain	Caja Rural–Seguros RGA	25	47	+ 3h 24' 26"
223	Sebastian Berwick	Australia	Caja Rural–Seguros RGA	26	89	+ 4h 44' 04"
224	Alex Molenaar	Netherlands	Caja Rural–Seguros RGA	26	DNS-6	–
225	Joel Nicolau	Spain	Caja Rural–Seguros RGA	28	129	+ 5h 37' 07"
226	Stefano Oldani	Italy	Caja Rural–Seguros RGA	28	126	+ 5h 33' 34"
227	Jakub Otruba	Czechia	Caja Rural–Seguros RGA	28	112	+ 5h 17' 23"
228	José Félix Parra	Spain	Caja Rural–Seguros RGA	29	DNS-18	–

=== By team ===
(United Arab Emirates) UAE Team Emirates XRG (UEX)
No.	Rider	Pos.
1	Tadej Pogačar (SLO)	1
2	Isaac del Toro (MEX)	3
3	Felix Großschartner (AUT)	32
4	Brandon McNulty (USA)	DNF-18
5	Nils Politt (GER)	72
6	Florian Vermeersch (BEL)	116
7	Tim Wellens (BEL)	74
8	Adam Yates (GBR)	21
Directeur sportif: Andrej Hauptman, José Antonio Fernández

(Netherlands) Visma–Lease a Bike (TVL)
No.	Rider	Pos.
11	Jonas Vingegaard (DEN)	DNF-15
12	Edoardo Affini (ITA)	DNF-19
13	Bruno Armirail (FRA)	62
14	Victor Campenaerts (BEL)	82
15	Per Strand Hagenes (NOR)	103
16	Matteo Jorgenson (USA)	30
17	Sepp Kuss (USA)	13
18	Davide Piganzoli (ITA)	14
Directeur sportif: Marc Reef, Frans Maassen

(Germany) Red Bull–Bora–Hansgrohe (RBH)
No.	Rider	Pos.
21	Remco Evenepoel (BEL)	2
22	Mattia Cattaneo (ITA)	33
23	Nico Denz (GER)	95
24	Jai Hindley (AUS)	15
25	Florian Lipowitz (GER)	DNF-16
26	Jan Tratnik (SLO)	83
27	Tim van Dijke (NED)	111
28	Maxim Van Gils (BEL)	27
Directeur sportif: Zak Dempster, Klaas Lodewyck

(Germany) Lidl–Trek (LTK)
No.	Rider	Pos.
31	Juan Ayuso (ESP)	7
32	Derek Gee-West (CAN)	25
33	Mads Pedersen (DEN)	80
34	Quinn Simmons (USA)	18
35	Mattias Skjelmose (DEN)	6
36	Toms Skujiņš (LAT)	94
37	Mathias Vacek (CZE)	49
38	Carlos Verona (ESP)	23
Directeur sportif: Bernhard Eisel, Maxime Monfort

(United States) EF Education–EasyPost (EFE)
No.	Rider	Pos.
41	Richard Carapaz (ECU)	8
42	Kasper Asgreen (DEN)	84
43	Alex Baudin (FRA)	46
44	Ben Healy (IRL)	59
45	Sean Quinn (USA)	19
46	Georg Steinhauser (GER)	113
47	Michael Valgren (DEN)	53
48	Max Walker (GBR)	106
Directeur sportif: Charly Wegelius, Tom Southam

(France) Decathlon CMA CGM (DCT)
No.	Rider	Pos.
51	Paul Seixas (FRA)	4
52	Tiesj Benoot (BEL)	17
53	Cees Bol (NED)	158
54	Daan Hoole (NED)	130
55	Olav Kooij (NED)	149
56	Aurélien Paret-Peintre (FRA)	42
57	Nicolas Prodhomme (FRA)	16
58	Matthew Riccitello (USA)	24
Directeur sportif: Sébastien Joly, Cyril Dessel

(Kazakhstan) XDS Astana Team (XAT)
No.	Rider	Pos.
61	Sergio Higuita (COL)	38
62	Davide Ballerini (ITA)	152
63	Aaron Gate (NZL)	121
64	Max Kanter (GER)	142
65	Harold Tejada (COL)	26
66	Mike Teunissen (NED)	124
67	Simone Velasco (ITA)	100
68	Nicolas Vinokurov (KAZ)	98
Directeur sportif: Dmitry Fofonov, Yvon Ledanois

Team Bahrain Victorious (TBV)
No.	Rider	Pos.
71	Lenny Martinez (FRA)	5
72	Phil Bauhaus (GER)	154
73	Damiano Caruso (ITA)	55
74	Kamil Gradek (POL)	155
75	Matej Mohorič (SLO)	92
76	Robert Stannard (AUS)	105
77	Antonio Tiberi (ITA)	37
78	Vlad Van Mechelen (BEL)	66
Directeur sportif: Roman Kreuziger, Gorazd Štangelj

(United Kingdom) Netcompany INEOS (NCI)
No.	Rider	Pos.
81	Egan Bernal (COL)	20
82	Thymen Arensman (NED)	22
83	Tobias Foss (NOR)	43
84	Filippo Ganna (ITA)	123
85	Dorian Godon (FRA)	136
86	Michał Kwiatkowski (POL)	110
87	Josh Tarling (GBR)	120
88	Kévin Vauquelin (FRA)	36
Directeur sportif: Kurt Asle Arvesen, Xabier Zandio

(Belgium) Soudal–Quick-Step (SOQ)
No.	Rider	Pos.
91	Tim Merlier (BEL)	DNF-15
92	Pascal Eenkhoorn (NED)	143
93	Valentin Paret-Peintre (FRA)	44
94	Jasper Stuyven (BEL)	71
95	Dylan van Baarle (NED)	131
96	Bert Van Lerberghe (BEL)	DNF-6
97	Ilan Van Wilder (BEL)	DNF-20
98	Louis Vervaeke (BEL)	67
Directeur sportif: Tom Steels, Wilfried Peeters

(Belgium) Alpecin–Premier Tech (APT)
No.	Rider	Pos.
101	Mathieu van der Poel (NED)	75
102	Ramses Debruyne (BEL)	DNS-14
103	Silvan Dillier (SUI)	137
104	Tim Marsman (NED)	133
105	Jasper Philipsen (BEL)	135
106	Edward Planckaert (BEL)	114
107	Jonas Rickaert (BEL)	115
108	Emiel Verstrynge (BEL)	96
Directeur sportif: Christoph Roodhooft, Frederik Willems

(Australia) Team Jayco–AlUla (JAY)
No.	Rider	Pos.
111	Ben O'Connor (AUS)	28
112	Pascal Ackermann (GER)	DNF-20
113	Luke Durbridge (AUS)	107
114	Felix Engelhardt (GER)	70
115	Michael Matthews (AUS)	52
116	Kelland O'Brien (AUS)	OTL-4
117	Luke Plapp (AUS)	91
118	Mauro Schmid (SUI)	35
Directeur sportif: Mathew Hayman, Steve Cummings

(Norway) Uno-X Mobility (UXM)
No.	Rider	Pos.
121	Tobias Halland Johannessen (NOR)	12
122	Jonas Abrahamsen (NOR)	77
123	Anthon Charmig (DEN)	OTL-14
124	Magnus Cort (DEN)	97
125	Anders Halland Johannessen (NOR)	64
126	Anders Skaarseth (NOR)	60
127	Torstein Træen (NOR)	DNS-7
128	Søren Wærenskjold (NOR)	138
Directeur sportif: Gabriel Rasch, Stig Kristiansen, Christian Andersen, Gino Van Oudenhove

(Switzerland) NSN Cycling Team (NSN)
No.	Rider	Pos.
131	Biniam Girmay (ERI)	141
132	Lewis Askey (GBR)	151
133	George Bennett (NZL)	68
134	Marco Frigo (ITA)	78
135	Matis Louvel (FRA)	157
136	Krists Neilands (LAT)	134
137	Jake Stewart (GBR)	150
138	Tom Van Asbroeck (BEL)	DNF-15
Directeur sportif: Steve Bauer, Dror Pekatch

(Spain) Movistar Team (MOV)
No.	Rider	Pos.
141	Cian Uijtdebroeks (BEL)	DNF-6
142	Pablo Castrillo (ESP)	29
143	Jefferson Alveiro Cepeda (ECU)	101
144	Raúl García Pierna (ESP)	34
145	Michel Hessmann (GER)	104
146	Nelson Oliveira (POR)	65
147	Javier Romo (ESP)	54
148	Einer Rubio (COL)	DNF-19
Directeur sportif: José Vicente García, Pablo Lastras

(Belgium) Lotto–Intermarché (LOI)
No.	Rider	Pos.
151	Arnaud De Lie (BEL)	DNF-3
152	Huub Artz (NED)	132
153	Jenno Berckmoes (BEL)	DNS-13
154	Lars Craps (BEL)	DNS-16
155	Liam Slock (BEL)	128
156	Lennert Van Eetvelt (BEL)	41
157	Baptiste Veistroffer (FRA)	146
158	Georg Zimmermann (GER)	90
Directeur sportif: Mario Aerts, Steven De Neef

(France) Cofidis (COF)
No.	Rider	Pos.
161	Ion Izagirre (ESP)	45
162	Piet Allegaert (BEL)	153
163	Alex Aranburu (ESP)	85
164	Jenthe Biermans (BEL)	144
165	Milan Fretin (BEL)	148
166	Alex Kirsch (LUX)	122
167	Hugo Page (FRA)	119
168	Benjamin Thomas (FRA)	117
Directeur sportif: Bingen Fernández, Sébastien Hinault, Roberto Damiani

(Switzerland) Pinarello–Q36.5 Pro Cycling Team (PQT)
No.	Rider	Pos.
171	Tom Pidcock (GBR)	9
172	Xabier Azparren (ESP)	99
173	Chris Harper (AUS)	DNS-11
174	Quinten Hermans (BEL)	39
175	Damien Howson (AUS)	88
176	Xandro Meurisse (BEL)	56
177	Brent Van Moer (BEL)	81
178	Fred Wright (GBR)	127
Directeur sportif: Kurt Bogaerts, Laurent Pichon

(France) Groupama–FDJ United (GFC)
No.	Rider	Pos.
181	Romain Grégoire (FRA)	57
182	Clément Berthet (FRA)	DNS-2
183	Clément Braz Afonso (FRA)	40
184	Ewen Costiou (FRA)	79
185	Lorenzo Germani (ITA)	93
186	Guillaume Martin (FRA)	31
187	Quentin Pacher (FRA)	58
188	Clément Russo (FRA)	69
Directeur sportif: Benoît Vaugrenard, Frédéric Guesdon

(Switzerland) Tudor Pro Cycling Team (TUD)
No.	Rider	Pos.
191	Julian Alaphilippe (FRA)	125
192	Arvid de Kleijn (NED)	DNF-6
193	Marco Haller (AUT)	147
194	Marc Hirschi (SUI)	48
195	Rick Pluimers (NED)	73
196	Michael Storer (AUS)	63
197	Matteo Trentin (ITA)	DNS-10
198	Yannis Voisard (SUI)	11
Directeur sportif: Claudio Cozzi, Matteo Tosatto

(France) Team TotalEnergies (TEN)
No.	Rider	Pos.
201	Jordan Jegat (FRA)	10
202	Nicolas Breuillard (FRA)	50
203	Joris Delbove (FRA)	51
204	Alexandre Delettre (FRA)	61
205	Thibault Guernalec (FRA)	109
206	Mathis Le Berre (FRA)	76
207	Anthony Turgis (FRA)	108
208	Mattéo Vercher (FRA)	86
Directeur sportif: Benoît Génauzeau, Lylian Lebreton

(Netherlands) Team Picnic–PostNL (TPP)
No.	Rider	Pos.
211	Warren Barguil (FRA)	87
212	Frits Biesterbos (NED)	DNS-13
213	Pavel Bittner (CZE)	140
214	John Degenkolb (GER)	145
215	Robbe Dhondt (BEL)	118
216	Niklas Märkl (GER)	139
217	Julius van den Berg (NED)	156
218	Frank van den Broek (NED)	102
Directeur sportif: Matthew Winston, Christian Guiberteau

(Spain) Caja Rural–Seguros RGA (CJR)
No.	Rider	Pos.
221	Fernando Gaviria (COL)	DNS-13
222	Abel Balderstone (ESP)	47
223	Sebastian Berwick (AUS)	89
224	Alex Molenaar (NED)	DNS-6
225	Joel Nicolau (ESP)	129
226	Stefano Oldani (ITA)	126
227	Jakub Otruba (CZE)	112
228	José Félix Parra (ESP)	DNS-18
Directeur sportif: Rubén Martínez, José Miguel Fernández

=== By nationality ===
Country	No. of riders	Finished	Stage wins
Australia	11	9	
Austria	2	2	
Belgium	31	22	6 (Remco Evenepoel x2, Tim Merlier x3, Jasper Philipsen)
Canada	1	1	
Colombia	5	3	
Czechia	3	3	
Denmark	7	5	1 (Mads Pedersen)
Ecuador	2	2	2 (Richard Carapaz x2)
Eritrea	1	1	
France	30	29	
Germany	12	10	
Great Britain	7	7	
Ireland	1	1	
Italy	12	10	
Kazakhstan	1	1	
Latvia	2	2	
Luxembourg	1	1	
Mexico	1	1	1 (Isaac del Toro)
Netherlands	17	14	3 (Olav Kooij, Mathieu van der Poel x2)
New Zealand	2	2	
Norway	8	7	1 (Søren Wærenskjold)
Poland	2	2	
Portugal	1	1	
Slovenia	3	3	5 (Tadej Pogačar x5)
Spain	11	10	
Switzerland	4	4	1 (Mauro Schmid)
United States	6	5	
Total	184	158	20
