= Team Halfords Bikehut =

Team information
- UCI code: HBH
- Registered: United Kingdom
- Founded: 2008
- Disbanded: 2009
- Discipline: Road with also riders active on the track
- Status: UCI Women's Team
- Bicycles: Boardman Bike

Key personnel
- General manager: Dave Brailsford

2008 Team Halfords Bikehut
- UCI Team ranking: 10th

Season victories
- One-day races: Road: 4 Track: 3
- Stage race overall: 0
- Stage race stages: 2
- Best ranked rider: Nicole Cooke (4th)

Team Halfords Bikehut was a 2008 UCI elite women's cycling team based in the United Kingdom. The team was formed in January 2008 with Dave Brailsford, performance director of British Cycling, the general manager. It had been a pro/national team mooted as the first full British professional women's team but there were two men in the team (Rob Hayles and Tom Southam). The team was in 2009 not an UCI Women's Teams anymore and consisted of a mix of mountain bikers and road racers (mainly men): Rob Hayles, Ed Clancy, Ian Wilkinson, Andy Tennant, Mark McNally, Rob Partridge, Seb Batchelor, David Fletcher, Annie Last, Sharon Laws, Ian Bibby. The team disbanded ahead of the 2010 season, with a number of riders moving to the Scottish-based Endura Racing team.

The team helped train some of the UK's medal-winning cyclists such as Nicole Cooke, who said: "Setting up Team Halfords was crucial to my success,".

== Team roster ==
Ages as of 1 January 2008.

| Rider | Date of birth |
|---|---|
| Nicole Cooke (GBR) | 13 April 1983 (aged 24) |
| Catherine Hare Willianson (GBR) | 13 March 1982 (aged 25) |
| Jessica Allen (GBR) | 12 January 1989 (aged 18) |
| Katie Curtis (GBR) | 1 November 1988 (aged 19) |
| Tanja Slater (GBR) | 9 May 1978 (aged 29) |
| Wendy Houvenaghel (GBR) | 27 November 1974 (aged 33) |

| Rider | Date of birth |
|---|---|
| Emma Trott (GBR) | 24 December 1989 (aged 18) |
| Lizzie Armitstead (GBR) | 18 December 1988 (aged 19) |
| Joanna Rowsell (GBR) | 5 December 1988 (aged 19) |
| Helen Gaskell (GBR) | 16 January 1983 (aged 24) |
| Sharon Laws (GBR) | 7 July 1974 (aged 33) |
| Katie Colclough (Note: Junior rider.) (GBR) | 20 January 1990 (aged 17) |

- Male riders: Tom Southam, Rob Hayles

== Season victories ==
Single day and stage races 2008
| Date | Nation | Race | Cat. | Winner |
|---|---|---|---|---|
| 17 May | France | Stage 1 Tour de l'Aude Cycliste Féminin | 2.2 | Nicole Cooke |
| 9 September | France | Stage 1 Tour Cycliste Féminin International de l'Ardèche | 2.2 | Nicole Cooke |

National, Continental, World and Olympic champions 2008
| Date | Discipline | Jersey | Winner |
|---|---|---|---|
| 28 March | Track Cycling World Champion – Team pursuit | | (United Kingdom) Joanna Rowsell (United Kingdom) Wendy Houvenaghel (with Rebecca Romero) |
| 28 June | British National Road Race Championships | | Nicole Cooke |
| 10 August | Olympic Champion – Women's road race | – | Nicole Cooke |
| 7 September | British National Time Trial Championships | | Nicole Cooke |
| September | European Track Champion – Under-23 team pursuit | | (United Kingdom) Lizzie Armitstead (United Kingdom) Katie Colclough (United Kingdom) Joanna Rowsell |
| 7 September | European Track Champion – Under-23 scratch | | (United Kingdom) Lizzie Armitstead |
| 27 September | World Champion – Women's road race | | Nicole Cooke |

== Results in major races ==
Results at the 2008 UCI Women's Road World Cup races
| # | Date | Race | Country | Best rider | Place |
|---|---|---|---|---|---|
| #1 | 24 February | Geelong World Cup | Australia | - | - |
| #2 | 24 March | Trofeo Alfredo Binda-Comune di Cittiglio | Italy | (United Kingdom) Nicole Cooke | 20th |
| #3 | 6 April | Tour of Flanders for Women | Belgium | (United Kingdom) Nicole Cooke | 16th |
| #4 | 12 April | Ronde van Drenthe | Netherlands | - | - |
| #5 | 23 April | La Flèche Wallonne Féminine | Belgium | (United Kingdom) Nicole Cooke | 8th |
| #6 | 4 May | Tour de Berne | Switzerland | - | - |
| #7 | 31 May | Coupe du Monde Cycliste Féminine de Montréal | Canada | - | - |
| #8 | 30 July | Open de Suède Vårgårda | Sweden | - | - |
| #9 | 1 August | Open de Suède Vårgårda TTT | Sweden | - | - |
| #10 | 24 August | GP de Plouay – Bretagne | France | - | - |
| #11 | 16 September | Rund um die Nürnberger Altstadt | Germany | - | - |

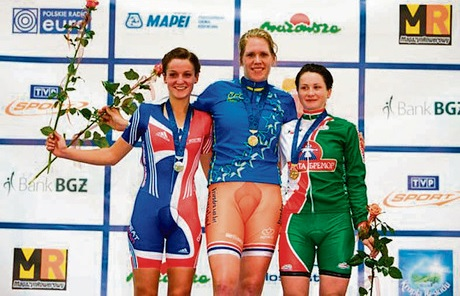
Lizie Armitstead (left) won the silver medal behind Ellen van Dijk in the points race at the European Track Championships

Results in other major single day races
| Date | Race (Note: Riders are in these championships part of the national team) | Rider | Place |
|---|---|---|---|
| 28 March | Track Cycling World Championships – Women's team pursuit | (United Kingdom) Joanna Rowsell (United Kingdom) Wendy Houvenaghel (with Rebecca Romero) | 1st place, gold medalist(s) |
| 29 March | Track Cycling World Championships – Women's points race | (United Kingdom) Lizzie Armitstead | 19th |
| 30 March | Track Cycling World Championships – Women's scratch | (United Kingdom) Lizzie Armitstead | 7th |
| 10 August | Summer Olympics – Women's road race | Nicole Cooke (GBR) | 1st place, gold medalist(s) |
| 3 September | European Track Championships – Women's omnium | (Netherlands) Ellen van Dijk | 2nd place, silver medalist(s) |
| September | European Track Championships – Women's under-23 team pursuit | (United Kingdom) Lizzie Armitstead (United Kingdom) Katie Colclough (United Kingdom) Joanna Rowsell | 1st place, gold medalist(s) |
| 6 September | European Track Championships – Women's under-23 individual pursuit | (United Kingdom) Joanna Rowsell | 3rd place, bronze medalist(s) |
| 7 September | European Track Championships – Women's under-23 scratch | (Netherlands) Lizzie Armitstead; Ex aequo with Ellen van Dijk | 1st place, gold medalist(s) |
| 6 September | European Track Championships – Women's under-23 points race | (Netherlands) Lizzie Armitstead | 2nd place, silver medalist(s) |
| 24 September | Road World Championships – Women's road race | Nicole Cooke (GBR) | 1st place, gold medalist(s) |

== UCI World Ranking ==
The team finished 10th in the UCI ranking for teams.

Individual UCI World Ranking
| Rank | Rider | Points |
|---|---|---|
| 4 | (United Kingdom) Nicole Cooke | 536 |
| 143 | (United Kingdom) Sharon Laws | 28 |
| 185 | (United Kingdom) Joanna Rowsell | 16 |
| 210 | (United Kingdom) Jessica Allen | 12 |
| 241 | (United Kingdom) Catherine Hare | 10 |
