= 2008 UCI Women's Road World Cup =

Series of bicycle races

- Eleventh edition of the UCI Women's Road World Cup

Details
- Dates: 24 February – 16 September
- Location: Australia, Canada and Europe
- Races: 11

Champions
- Individual champion: Judith Arndt (GER) (Team Columbia Women)
- Teams' champion: Team Columbia Women

The 2008 UCI Women's Road World Cup was the 11th edition of the UCI Women's Road World Cup. The calendar was similar to the 2007 UCI Women's Road World Cup with the addition of the Trofeo Alfredo Binda-Comune di Cittiglio and a team time trial event in conjunction with the Open de Suède Vårgårda.

== Races ==
| | Date | Race | Country | Winner | Team |
|---|---|---|---|---|---|
| #1 | 24 February | Geelong World Cup | Australia | Katheryn Mattis (USA) | Webcor Builders Cycling Team |
| #2 | 24 March | Trofeo Alfredo Binda-Comune di Cittiglio | Italy | Emma Pooley (GBR) | Team Specialized Designs for Women |
| #3 | 6 April | Tour of Flanders for Women | Belgium | Judith Arndt (GER) | Team High Road Women |
| #4 | 12 April | Ronde van Drenthe | Netherlands | Chantal Beltman (NED) | Team High Road Women |
| #5 | 23 April | La Flèche Wallonne Féminine | Belgium | Marianne Vos (NED) | DSB Bank Ladies Cycling-Team |
| #6 | 4 May | Tour de Berne | Switzerland | Susanne Ljungskog (SWE) | Menikini–Selle Italia |
| #7 | 31 May | Coupe du Monde Cycliste Féminine de Montréal | Canada | Judith Arndt (GER) | Team High Road Women |
| #8 | 30 July | Open de Suède Vårgårda | Sweden | Kori Kelley-Seehafer (USA) | Menikini–Selle Italia |
| #9 | 1 August | Open de Suède Vårgårda TTT | Sweden | Priska Doppmann (SUI); Karin Thürig (SUI); Christiane Soeder (AUT); Carla Ryan (AUS) | Cervélo–Lifeforce Pro Cycling Team |
| #10 | 24 August | GP de Plouay – Bretagne | France | Fabiana Luperini (ITA) | Menikini–Selle Italia |
| #11 | 16 September | Rund um die Nürnberger Altstadt | Germany | Judith Arndt (GER) | Team Columbia Women |

== UCI Women's Teams ==
| UCI Code | Team Name | Country | Website |
|---|---|---|---|
| EHN | Elk Haus | Austria | elkhaus-noe.com Archived 2008-08-27 at the Wayback Machine |
| UNG | Team Uniqa | Austria | team-uniqa.com |
| VLL | Topsport Vlaanderen Thompson Ladies Team | Belgium | cyclingteam-vlaanderen.be |
| BPD | Bizkaia–Durango | Spain | duranguesa.com |
| DKT | Debabarrena–Kirolgi | Spain | |
| FUT | Vienne Futuroscope | France | cyclisme-vienne-futuroscope.com |
| TPF | Team Pro Feminin les Carroz | France | team47petitesreines.free.fr/ |
| ESG | ESGL 93–GSD Gestion | France | |
| TLG | Team Lot-et-Garonne | France | |
| GRT | Global Racing Team | United Kingdom | |
| RAC | Rapha/Condor | United Kingdom | |
| NUR | Equipe Nürnberger Versicherung | Germany | |
| TMP | Team High Road Women | Germany | highroadsports.com/team |
| TGH | Team Getränke-Hoffmann | Germany | |
| GPC | Giant Pro Cycling | Hong Kong | |
| FRW | Cycling Team Titanedi–Frezza Acca Due O | Italy | dream-t.com |
| FEN | Fenixs | Italy | |

| UCI Code | Team Name | Country | Website |
|---|---|---|---|
| SAF | Safi–Pasta Zara–Manhattan | Italy | |
| USC | USC Chirio Forno d'Asolo | Italy | www.chiriofornodasolo.it/ |
| MGI | Menikini–Selle Italia | Italy | |
| SEM | Saccarelli Emu Sea Marsciano | Italy | |
| MIC | S.C. Michela Fanini Record Rox | Italy | |
| TOG | Top Girls Fassa Bortolo Raxy Line | Italy | |
| TSC | Therme Skin Care | Netherlands | |
| AAD | AA-Drink Cycling Team | Netherlands | |
| DSB | Team DSB Bank | Netherlands | |
| VVP | Vrienden van het Platteland | Netherlands | |
| FLX | Team Flexpoint | Netherlands | teamflexpoint.com |
| PAQ | POL–Aqua | Poland | |
| PRI | Primus | Poland | |
| PTG | Petrogradets | Russia | |
| RLT | Cervélo–Lifeforce Pro Cycling Team | Switzerland | |
| BCT | Bigla Cycling Team | Switzerland | |
| TSW | Team Specialized Designs for Women | Switzerland | |
| WEB | Webcor Builders Cycling Team | United States | |
| VBR | Verducci Breakaway Racing | United States | |

== Final results ==
=== Individual ===
Final standings
| Rank | Rider | Team | Points |
|---|---|---|---|
| 1 | Judith Arndt (GER) | Team High Road Women | 365 |
| 2 | Suzanne de Goede (NED) | Equipe Nürnberger Versicherung | 232 |
| 3 | Marianne Vos (NED) | Team DSB Bank | 182 |
| 4 | Fabiana Luperini (ITA) | Menikini–Selle Italia | 125 |
| 5 | Emma Pooley (GBR) | Team Specialized Designs for Women | 117 |
| 6 | Chantal Beltman (NED) | Team High Road Women | 114 |
| 7 | Kirsten Wild (NED) | AA-Drink Cycling Team | 109 |
| 8 | Charlotte Becker (GER) | Equipe Nürnberger Versicherung | 105 |
| 9 | Marta Bastianelli (ITA) | Safi–Pasta Zara–Manhattan | 101 |
| 10 | Ina Teutenberg (GER) | Team High Road Women | 100 |
