= 2026 Tour de France, Stage 12 to Stage 21 =

Cycling results

The 2026 Tour de France was the 113th edition of the Tour de France.

== Classification standings ==
Legend
| Denotes the leader of the general classification | Denotes the leader of the mountains classification |
| Denotes the leader of the points classification | Denotes the leader of the young rider classification |
| Denotes the leader of the team classification | Denotes the winner of the combativity award |

== Stage 12 ==
16 July 2026 – Circuit de Nevers Magny-Cours to Chalon-sur-Saône, 179.1 km (111.3 mi)

The twelfth stage of the stage took riders eastwards from Circuit de Nevers Magny-Cours to Chalon-sur-Saône, over a flat 179.1 km (111.3 mi) course with three fourth-category climbs.

Merlier won stage 12 in a sprint finish despite a large crash behind. Pedersen remained in the green jersey of the points classification, slowly extending his lead.

Stage 12 result
| Rank | Rider | Team | Time |
|---|---|---|---|
| 1 | Tim Merlier (BEL) | Soudal–Quick-Step | 3h 38' 53" |
| 2 | Olav Kooij (NED) | Decathlon CMA CGM | + 0" |
| 3 | Jasper Philipsen (BEL) | Alpecin–Premier Tech | + 0" |
| 4 | Biniam Girmay (ERI) | NSN Cycling Team | + 0" |
| 5 | Milan Fretin (BEL) | Cofidis | + 0" |
| 6 | Anthony Turgis (FRA) | Team TotalEnergies | + 0" |
| 7 | Max Kanter (GER) | XDS Astana Team | + 0" |
| 8 | Clément Russo (FRA) | Groupama–FDJ United | + 0" |
| 9 | Mads Pedersen (DEN) | Lidl–Trek | + 0" |
| 10 | Huub Artz (NED) | Lotto–Intermarché | + 0" |

General classification after stage 12
| Rank | Rider | Team | Time |
|---|---|---|---|
| 1 | Tadej Pogačar (SLO) | UAE Team Emirates XRG | 43h 04' 01" |
| 2 | Jonas Vingegaard (DEN) | Visma–Lease a Bike | + 3' 36" |
| 3 | Remco Evenepoel (BEL) | Red Bull–Bora–Hansgrohe | + 4' 06" |
| 4 | Juan Ayuso (ESP) | Lidl–Trek | + 4' 22" |
| 5 | Paul Seixas (FRA) | Decathlon CMA CGM | + 4' 35" |
| 6 | Florian Lipowitz (GER) | Red Bull–Bora–Hansgrohe | + 4' 44" |
| 7 | Isaac del Toro (MEX) | UAE Team Emirates XRG | + 5' 08" |
| 8 | Mattias Skjelmose (DEN) | Lidl–Trek | + 5' 45" |
| 9 | Lenny Martinez (FRA) | Team Bahrain Victorious | + 6' 34" |
| 10 | Tom Pidcock (GBR) | Pinarello–Q36.5 Pro Cycling Team | + 11' 49" |

== Stage 13 ==
17 July 2026 – Dole to Belfort, 205.8 km (127.9 mi)

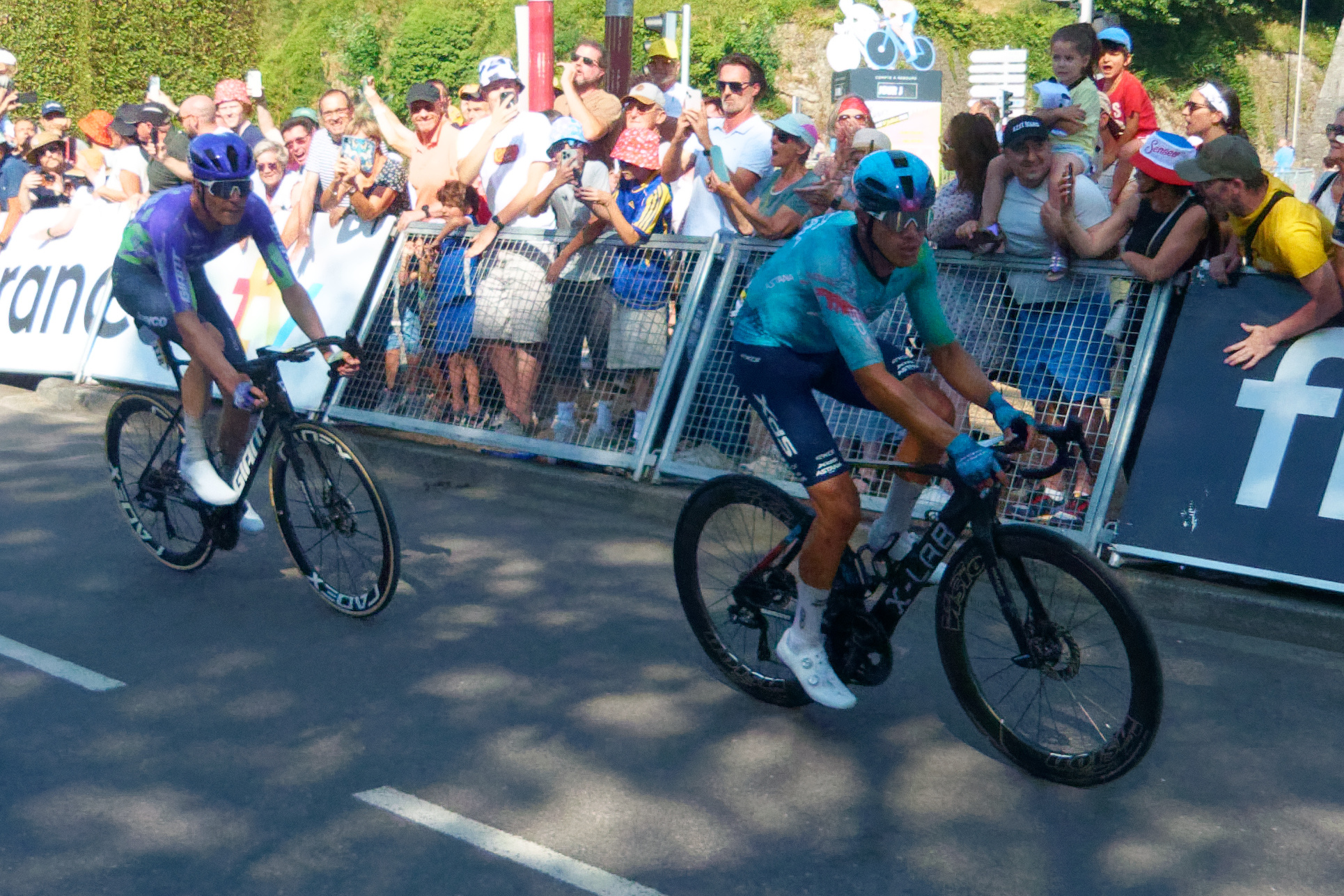
Mauro Schmid and Harold Tejada approaching the finish line in Belfort

Heading north-east towards the Vosges mountains, the thirteenth stage from Dole to Belfort was the longest of the race at 205.8 km (127.9 mi). Two climbs featured in the last 50 km (31 mi) – the third-category climb of Col de Croix, followed by the first-category climb of Ballon d'Alsace (8.9km at an average gradient of 6.9%). Riders then descended to the finish in Belfort.

Stage 13 was won by Mauro Schmid (Team Jayco–AlUla) from a breakaway, with Tom Pidcock (Pinarello–Q36.5 Pro Cycling Team) leaping up to 4th overall owing to his positioning in the breakaway.

Stage 13 result
| Rank | Rider | Team | Time |
|---|---|---|---|
| 1 | Mauro Schmid (SUI) | Team Jayco–AlUla | 4h 06' 58" |
| 2 | Harold Tejada (COL) | XDS Astana Team | + 0" |
| 3 | Tom Pidcock (GBR) | Pinarello–Q36.5 Pro Cycling Team | + 2" |
| 4 | Maxim Van Gils (BEL) | Red Bull–Bora–Hansgrohe | + 2" |
| 5 | Brandon McNulty (USA) | UAE Team Emirates XRG | + 2" |
| 6 | Kévin Vauquelin (FRA) | Netcompany INEOS | + 2" |
| 7 | Jordan Jegat (FRA) | Team TotalEnergies | + 2" |
| 8 | Clément Braz Afonso (FRA) | Groupama–FDJ United | + 2" |
| 9 | Tim Wellens (BEL) | UAE Team Emirates XRG | + 2" |
| 10 | Luke Plapp (AUS) | Team Jayco–AlUla | + 11" |

General classification after stage 13
| Rank | Rider | Team | Time |
|---|---|---|---|
| 1 | Tadej Pogačar (SLO) | UAE Team Emirates XRG | 47h 18' 31" |
| 2 | Jonas Vingegaard (DEN) | Visma–Lease a Bike | + 3' 36" |
| 3 | Remco Evenepoel (BEL) | Red Bull–Bora–Hansgrohe | + 4' 06" |
| 4 | Tom Pidcock (GBR) | Pinarello–Q36.5 Pro Cycling Team | + 4' 15" |
| 5 | Juan Ayuso (ESP) | Lidl–Trek | + 4' 22" |
| 6 | Paul Seixas (FRA) | Decathlon CMA CGM | + 4' 35" |
| 7 | Florian Lipowitz (GER) | Red Bull–Bora–Hansgrohe | + 4' 44" |
| 8 | Isaac del Toro (MEX) | UAE Team Emirates XRG | + 5' 08" |
| 9 | Mattias Skjelmose (DEN) | Lidl–Trek | + 5' 45" |
| 10 | Lenny Martinez (FRA) | Team Bahrain Victorious | + 6' 34" |

== Stage 14 ==
18 July 2026 – Mulhouse to Le Markstein Fellering, 155.3 km (96.5 mi)

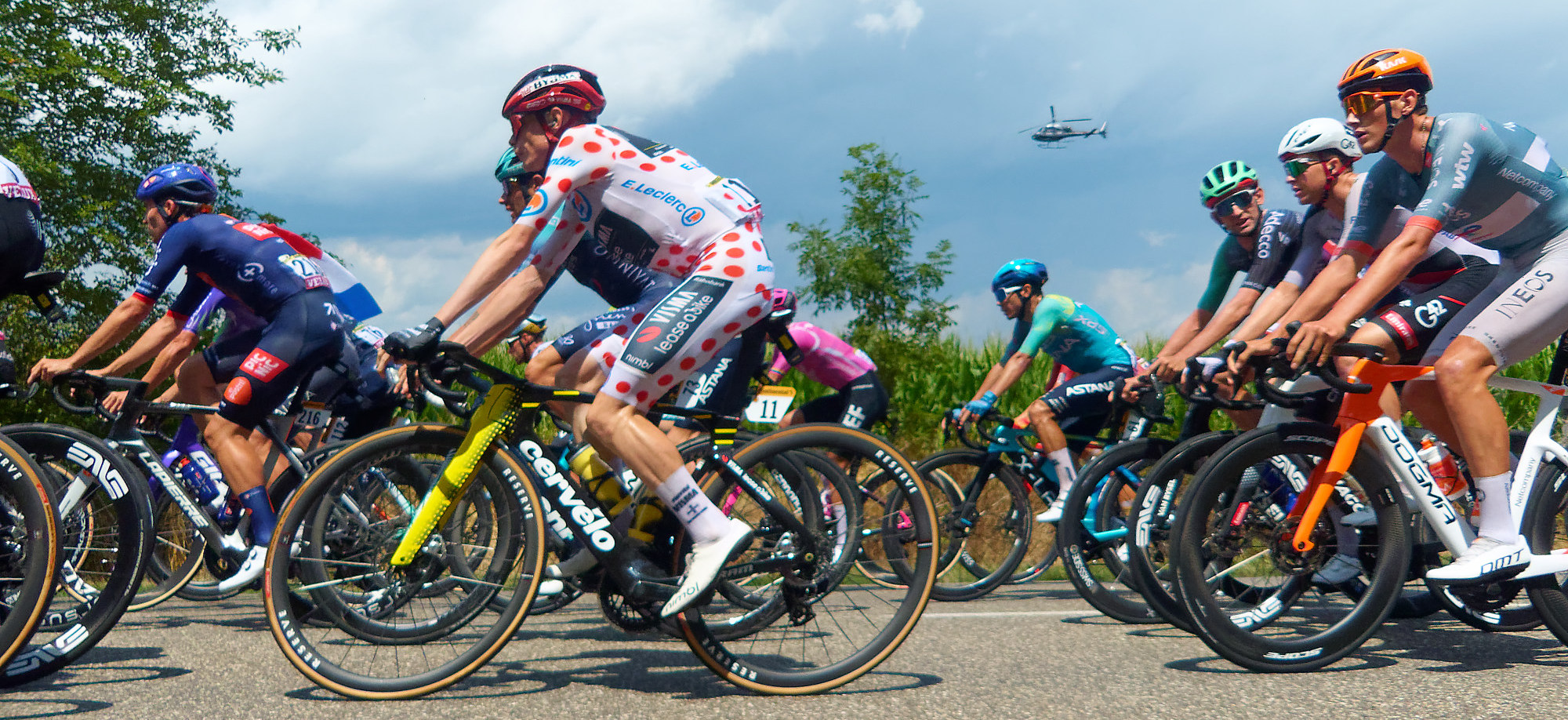
Peloton on stage 14

Remaining in the Vosges mountains, the fourteenth stage from Mulhouse to Le Markstein Fellering had four categorised climbs over 155.3 km (96.5 mi). The first-category climb of Grand Ballon (21.5 km at an average gradient of 4.8%) was followed by the second-category Col du Page, another ascent of the first-category climb Ballon d'Alsace, and the first-category Col du Haag (11.2 km at an average gradient of 7.3%) – at the summit of Col du Haag, the finish at Le Markstein was 5 km (3.1 mi) away along a plateau.

Stage 14 remained in the Vosges, with Pogačar attacking on the Col du Haag from the group of GC contenders. As Pogačar built an advantage on the plateau to the finish, Vingegaard and Seixas worked together to minimise the gap – eventually finishing around 40 seconds behind Pogačar, who now had a GC lead of around 4 and a half minutes. Vingegaard remained in second place overall, with Evenepoel in third. The other GC contenders – Seixas, Ayuso, Lipowitz and Del Toro – were all within 30 seconds of each other.

Stage 14 result
| Rank | Rider | Team | Time |
|---|---|---|---|
| 1 | Tadej Pogačar (SLO) | UAE Team Emirates XRG | 4h 00' 07" |
| 2 | Isaac del Toro (MEX) | UAE Team Emirates XRG | + 38" |
| 3 | Paul Seixas (FRA) | Decathlon CMA CGM | + 38" |
| 4 | Jonas Vingegaard (DEN) | Visma–Lease a Bike | + 44" |
| 5 | Remco Evenepoel (BEL) | Red Bull–Bora–Hansgrohe | + 48" |
| 6 | Juan Ayuso (ESP) | Lidl–Trek | + 50" |
| 7 | Florian Lipowitz (GER) | Red Bull–Bora–Hansgrohe | + 50" |
| 8 | Richard Carapaz (ECU) | EF Education–EasyPost | + 1' 18" |
| 9 | Tobias Halland Johannessen (NOR) | Uno-X Mobility | + 1' 40" |
| 10 | Mattias Skjelmose (DEN) | Lidl–Trek | + 1' 40" |

General classification after stage 14
| Rank | Rider | Team | Time |
|---|---|---|---|
| 1 | Tadej Pogačar (SLO) | UAE Team Emirates XRG | 51h 18' 28" |
| 2 | Jonas Vingegaard (DEN) | Visma–Lease a Bike | + 4' 30" |
| 3 | Remco Evenepoel (BEL) | Red Bull–Bora–Hansgrohe | + 5' 04" |
| 4 | Paul Seixas (FRA) | Decathlon CMA CGM | + 5' 19" |
| 5 | Juan Ayuso (ESP) | Lidl–Trek | + 5' 22" |
| 6 | Florian Lipowitz (GER) | Red Bull–Bora–Hansgrohe | + 5' 44" |
| 7 | Isaac del Toro (MEX) | UAE Team Emirates XRG | + 5' 50" |
| 8 | Mattias Skjelmose (DEN) | Lidl–Trek | + 7' 35" |
| 9 | Tom Pidcock (GBR) | Pinarello–Q36.5 Pro Cycling Team | + 7' 59" |
| 10 | Lenny Martinez (FRA) | Team Bahrain Victorious | + 8' 25" |

== Stage 15 ==
19 July 2026 – Champagnole to Plateau de Solaison, 183.9 km (114.3 mi)

Moving south to the mountains in the Jura and French Alps, stage 15 took riders from Champagnole to a summit finish at Plateau de Solaison over a 183.9 km (114.3 mi) course. Four categorised climbs were featured – two third-category climbs, the first-category Le Salève - Col de la Croisette (4.6 km at an average gradient of 11.2%) and the hors catégorie ascent to the summit finish at Plateau de Solaison (11.3 km at an average gradient of 9%, with the finish at an elevation of 1,508 m (4,948 ft)).

Prior to the start of stage 15, the International Testing Agency tested Vingegaard early in the morning around 2am, with Pogačar tested around 5am. The tests took place outside of normal testing hours, with it later emerging that these and other late-night tests had been authorised by a Paris prosecutor. Reacting to the tests, Vingegaard stated that "It’s good that they test, but when it’s affecting performance and your sleep, I don’t think it’s so good.” Evenepoel criticised the tests, stating that it was disrespectful and "something we [...] should not accept as athletes".

Stage 15 took the race into the Savoyard Alps, with a finish at Plateau de Solaison. With about 24 km (15 mi) remaining in the stage, Vingeegaard crashed exiting a roundabout, hitting the kerb. He abandoned the race, with news later emerging that he had broken his collarbone. Merlier also abandoned during this stage, albeit due to the challenging terrain rather than injury. On the climb to the finish at Plateau de Solaison, Pogačar led Del Toro and Evenepoel as Seixas and Lipowitz lost time behind. In the finish, Evenepoel outsprinted Pogačar for the line to take his first mountain stage victory at the Tour de France. Following the stage, Pogačar stated that Vingegaard’s 2am drug test would have "ruined his deep sleep and then completely ruined the night", noting that this could have caused Vingegaard’s crash. Pogačar did note that "if this is necessary to still prove that we are riding clean, then I totally accept it".

Stage 15 result
| Rank | Rider | Team | Time |
|---|---|---|---|
| 1 | Remco Evenepoel (BEL) | Red Bull–Bora–Hansgrohe | 4h 23' 09" |
| 2 | Tadej Pogačar (SLO) | UAE Team Emirates XRG | + 0" |
| 3 | Isaac del Toro (MEX) | UAE Team Emirates XRG | + 6" |
| 4 | Paul Seixas (FRA) | Decathlon CMA CGM | + 58" |
| 5 | Florian Lipowitz (GER) | Red Bull–Bora–Hansgrohe | + 58" |
| 6 | Lenny Martinez (FRA) | Team Bahrain Victorious | + 1' 57" |
| 7 | Mattias Skjelmose (DEN) | Lidl–Trek | + 1' 57" |
| 8 | Juan Ayuso (ESP) | Lidl–Trek | + 2' 00" |
| 9 | Adam Yates (GBR) | UAE Team Emirates XRG | + 2' 00" |
| 10 | Quinn Simmons (USA) | Lidl–Trek | + 2' 16" |

General classification after stage 15
| Rank | Rider | Team | Time |
|---|---|---|---|
| 1 | Tadej Pogačar (SLO) | UAE Team Emirates XRG | 55h 41' 31" |
| 2 | Remco Evenepoel (BEL) | Red Bull–Bora–Hansgrohe | + 5' 00" |
| 3 | Isaac del Toro (MEX) | UAE Team Emirates XRG | + 5' 58" |
| 4 | Paul Seixas (FRA) | Decathlon CMA CGM | + 6' 23" |
| 5 | Florian Lipowitz (GER) | Red Bull–Bora–Hansgrohe | + 6' 48" |
| 6 | Juan Ayuso (ESP) | Lidl–Trek | + 7' 28" |
| 7 | Mattias Skjelmose (DEN) | Lidl–Trek | + 9' 38" |
| 8 | Lenny Martinez (FRA) | Team Bahrain Victorious | + 10' 28" |
| 9 | Tom Pidcock (GBR) | Pinarello–Q36.5 Pro Cycling Team | + 11' 19" |
| 10 | Jordan Jegat (FRA) | Team TotalEnergies | + 19' 26" |

== Rest day 2 ==
20 July 2025 – Haute-Savoie

== Stage 16 ==
21 July 2026 – Évian-les-Bains to Thonon-les-Bains, 26.1 km (16.2 mi) (ITT)

Stage 16 was the only individual time trial of the 2026 edition of the Tour, 26.1 km (16.2 mi) from Évian-les-Bains to Thonon-les-Bains, with a second-category climb of the Côte de Larringes (9.7 km at an average gradient of 4.3%) located in the first third of the course.

Evenepoel set the fastest time, winning a Tour time trial stage for the third time in his career. Pogačar was second, 28 seconds slower than Evenepoel, with his lead now 4 and a half minutes. Third on the stage was Mattias Skjelmose (Lidl–Trek), over a minute slower than Evenepoel. In the fight for third overall in GC, Seixas beat del Toro, cutting the gap between them to around 20 seconds. Lipowitz crashed on the descent, breaking his collarbone and abandoning the race. Ayuso therefore moved into 5th overall on GC.

Stage 16 result
| Rank | Rider | Team | Time |
|---|---|---|---|
| 1 | Remco Evenepoel (BEL) | Red Bull–Bora–Hansgrohe | 32' 19" |
| 2 | Tadej Pogačar (SLO) | UAE Team Emirates XRG | + 28" |
| 3 | Mattias Skjelmose (DEN) | Lidl–Trek | + 1' 04" |
| 4 | Paul Seixas (FRA) | Decathlon CMA CGM | + 1' 16" |
| 5 | Isaac del Toro (MEX) | UAE Team Emirates XRG | + 1' 21" |
| 6 | Mattia Cattaneo (ITA) | Red Bull–Bora–Hansgrohe | + 1' 42" |
| 7 | Thymen Arensman (NED) | Netcompany INEOS | + 1' 47" |
| 8 | Bruno Armirail (FRA) | Visma–Lease a Bike | + 1' 55" |
| 9 | Pablo Castrillo (ESP) | Movistar Team | + 2' 00" |
| 10 | Josh Tarling (GBR) | Netcompany INEOS | + 2' 02" |

General classification after stage 16
| Rank | Rider | Team | Time |
|---|---|---|---|
| 1 | Tadej Pogačar (SLO) | UAE Team Emirates XRG | 56h 14' 18" |
| 2 | Remco Evenepoel (BEL) | Red Bull–Bora–Hansgrohe | + 4' 32" |
| 3 | Isaac del Toro (MEX) | UAE Team Emirates XRG | + 6' 51" |
| 4 | Paul Seixas (FRA) | Decathlon CMA CGM | + 7' 11" |
| 5 | Juan Ayuso (ESP) | Lidl–Trek | + 9' 22" |
| 6 | Mattias Skjelmose (DEN) | Lidl–Trek | + 10' 14" |
| 7 | Lenny Martinez (FRA) | Team Bahrain Victorious | + 12' 50" |
| 8 | Tom Pidcock (GBR) | Pinarello–Q36.5 Pro Cycling Team | + 12' 58" |
| 9 | Jordan Jegat (FRA) | Team TotalEnergies | + 22' 50" |
| 10 | Yannis Voisard (SUI) | Tudor Pro Cycling Team | + 24' 18" |

== Stage 17 ==
22 July 2026 – Chambéry to Voiron, 174.7 km (108.6 mi)

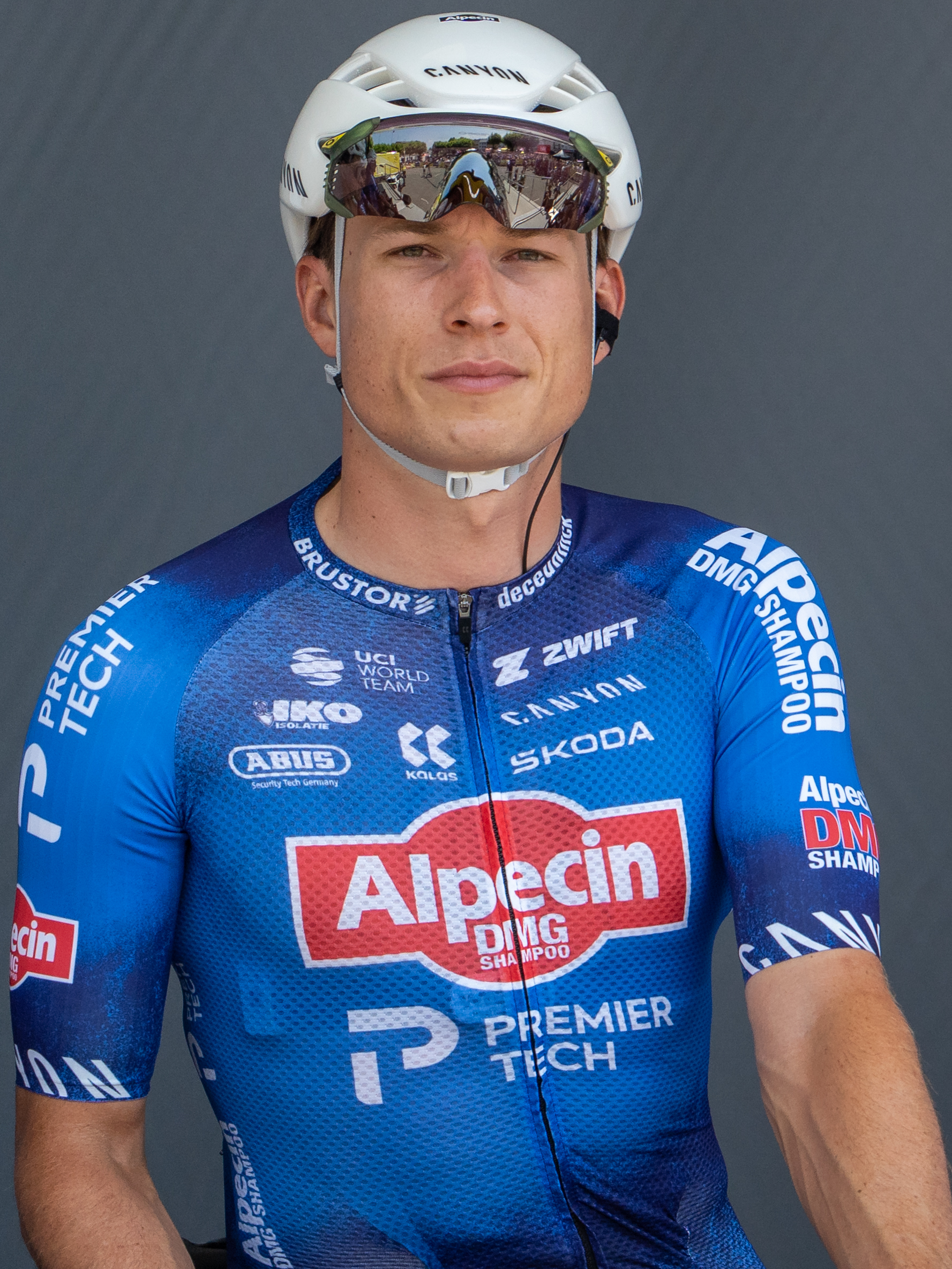
Stage winner Jasper Philipsen (Alpecin–Premier Tech), pictured before stage 5

The seventeenth stage was a 174.7 km (108.6 mi) course from Chambéry to Voiron, with four categorised climbs (three fourth-category, one third-category) located in the first 60 km (37 mi) of the stage.

On the stage, Pedersen pushed across to a large breakaway and then won the intermediate sprint with around 28 km (17 mi). Multiple attacks ensued, with a sprinters in a reduced bunch approaching the finish. In the sprint finish, Philipsen used van der Poel to propel him to the stage victory, with Pedersen only able to finish in 8th place. Pedersen's lead in the points classification was cut to seven points, with limited opportunities to gain points before Paris.

Stage 17 result
| Rank | Rider | Team | Time |
|---|---|---|---|
| 1 | Jasper Philipsen (BEL) | Alpecin–Premier Tech | 3h 41' 13" |
| 2 | Mauro Schmid (SUI) | Team Jayco–AlUla | + 0" |
| 3 | Olav Kooij (NED) | Decathlon CMA CGM | + 0" |
| 4 | Lewis Askey (GBR) | NSN Cycling Team | + 0" |
| 5 | Rick Pluimers (NED) | Tudor Pro Cycling Team | + 0" |
| 6 | Clément Russo (FRA) | Groupama–FDJ United | + 0" |
| 7 | Huub Artz (NED) | Lotto–Intermarché | + 0" |
| 8 | Mads Pedersen (DEN) | Lidl–Trek | + 0" |
| 9 | Michael Matthews (AUS) | Team Jayco–AlUla | + 0" |
| 10 | Aaron Gate (NZL) | XDS Astana Team | + 0" |

General classification after stage 17
| Rank | Rider | Team | Time |
|---|---|---|---|
| 1 | Tadej Pogačar (SLO) | UAE Team Emirates XRG | 60h 04' 17" |
| 2 | Remco Evenepoel (BEL) | Red Bull–Bora–Hansgrohe | + 4' 32" |
| 3 | Isaac del Toro (MEX) | UAE Team Emirates XRG | + 6' 51" |
| 4 | Paul Seixas (FRA) | Decathlon CMA CGM | + 7' 11" |
| 5 | Juan Ayuso (ESP) | Lidl–Trek | + 9' 22" |
| 6 | Mattias Skjelmose (DEN) | Lidl–Trek | + 10' 14" |
| 7 | Lenny Martinez (FRA) | Team Bahrain Victorious | + 12' 50" |
| 8 | Tom Pidcock (GBR) | Pinarello–Q36.5 Pro Cycling Team | + 12' 58" |
| 9 | Jordan Jegat (FRA) | Team TotalEnergies | + 14' 04" |
| 10 | Yannis Voisard (SUI) | Tudor Pro Cycling Team | + 24' 18" |

== Stage 18 ==
23 July 2026 – Voiron to Orcières-Merlette, 185.2 km (115.1 mi)

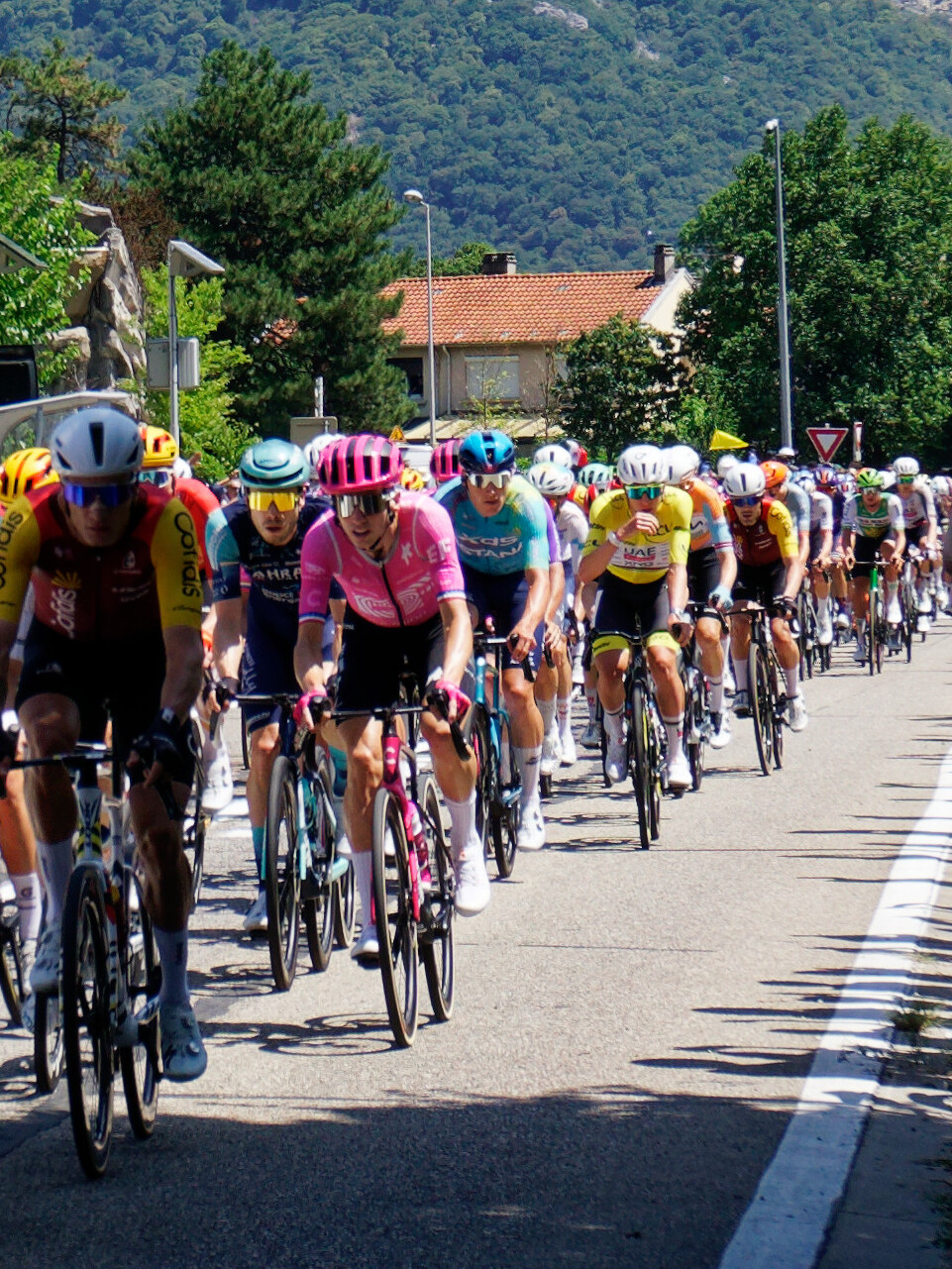
Peloton in Sassenage

Remaining in the French Alps, the eighteenth stage gradually climbed from Voiron to a summit finish at Orcières-Merlette over a 185.2 km (115.1 mi) course. The stage included five categorised climbs – the first-category Côte d'Engins (11.4 km at an average gradient of 5.4%), followed by two third-category climbs and a second-category climb, before the first-category ascent to the summit finish at Orcières-Merlette (7.1 km at an average gradient of 6.7%, with the finish at an elevation of 1,825 m (5,988 ft)).

A large breakaway went away, with strong climbers as well as Pedersen present. Pedersen took maximum points at the intermediate sprint, extending his lead to thirty-two points. On the climbs, the breakaway slowly diminished as Valentin Paret-Peintre (Soudal–Quick-Step) tried to gain points in the mountains classification. In the final climb however, Carapaz was the strongest rider, breaking away from the remaining four riders with 3.5 km (2.2 mi) to go, taking the stage win and the lead in the mountains classification. GC contenders finished together, although there was some concern that UAE Team Emirates XRG were suffering from illness, with Pogačar's key lieutenant Brandon McNulty abandoning the race.

Stage 18 result
| Rank | Rider | Team | Time |
|---|---|---|---|
| 1 | Richard Carapaz (ECU) | EF Education–EasyPost | 4h 26' 21" |
| 2 | Mauro Schmid (SUI) | Team Jayco–AlUla | + 45" |
| 3 | Matteo Jorgenson (USA) | Visma–Lease a Bike | + 45" |
| 4 | Valentin Paret-Peintre (FRA) | Soudal–Quick-Step | + 1' 14" |
| 5 | Tobias Halland Johannessen (NOR) | Uno-X Mobility | + 1' 57" |
| 6 | Raúl García Pierna (ESP) | Movistar Team | + 2' 12" |
| 7 | Pablo Castrillo (ESP) | Movistar Team | + 4' 30" |
| 8 | Lenny Martinez (FRA) | Team Bahrain Victorious | + 4' 35" |
| 9 | Remco Evenepoel (BEL) | Red Bull–Bora–Hansgrohe | + 4' 35" |
| 10 | Tom Pidcock (GBR) | Pinarello–Q36.5 Pro Cycling Team | + 4' 35" |

General classification after stage 18
| Rank | Rider | Team | Time |
|---|---|---|---|
| 1 | Tadej Pogačar (SLO) | UAE Team Emirates XRG | 64h 35' 13" |
| 2 | Remco Evenepoel (BEL) | Red Bull–Bora–Hansgrohe | + 4' 32" |
| 3 | Isaac del Toro (MEX) | UAE Team Emirates XRG | + 6' 51" |
| 4 | Paul Seixas (FRA) | Decathlon CMA CGM | + 7' 11" |
| 5 | Juan Ayuso (ESP) | Lidl–Trek | + 9' 22" |
| 6 | Mattias Skjelmose (DEN) | Lidl–Trek | + 10' 14" |
| 7 | Lenny Martinez (FRA) | Team Bahrain Victorious | + 12' 50" |
| 8 | Tom Pidcock (GBR) | Pinarello–Q36.5 Pro Cycling Team | + 12' 58" |
| 9 | Jordan Jegat (FRA) | Team TotalEnergies | + 14' 04" |
| 10 | Richard Carapaz (ECU) | EF Education–EasyPost | + 21' 00" |

== Stage 19 ==
24 July 2026 – Gap to Alpe d'Huez, 127.9 km (79.5 mi)

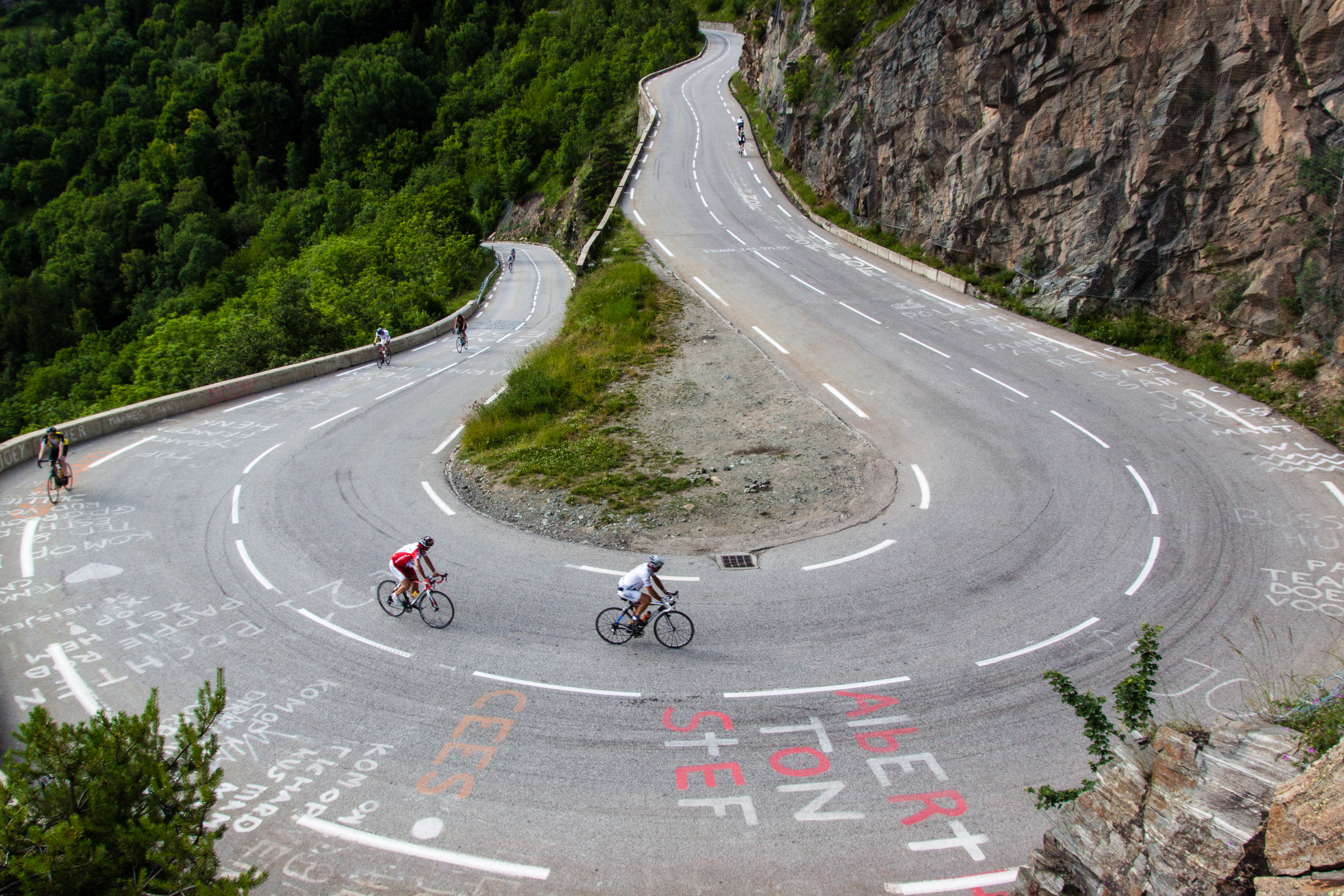
Stage 19 finished at the top of Alpe d'Huez; the climb is 13.8 km (8.6 mi) long, an average gradient of 7.9% and features 21 hairpin turns.

Heading north, the nineteenth stage took riders from Gap to a summit finish at Alpe d'Huez over a 127.9 km (79.5 mi) course. The stage included four categorised climbs – two second-category climbs, the first category Col du Noyer (7.2 km at an average gradient of 8.5%) and the hors catégorie ascent to the summit finish at Alpe d'Huez (13.8 km at an average gradient of 8.1%, with the finish at an elevation of 1,850 m (6,070 ft)).

Tadej Pogačar eclipsed Marco Pantani's Alpe d'Huez record, set in 1995.

Stage 19 result
| Rank | Rider | Team | Time |
|---|---|---|---|
| 1 | Tadej Pogačar (SLO) | UAE Team Emirates XRG | 3h 17' 57" |
| 2 | Lenny Martinez (FRA) | Team Bahrain Victorious | + 6" |
| 3 | Richard Carapaz (ECU) | EF Education–EasyPost | + 9" |
| 4 | Sepp Kuss (USA) | Visma–Lease a Bike | + 1' 14" |
| 5 | Tobias Halland Johannessen (NOR) | Uno-X Mobility | + 2' 07" |
| 6 | Remco Evenepoel (BEL) | Red Bull–Bora–Hansgrohe | + 2' 29" |
| 7 | Isaac del Toro (MEX) | UAE Team Emirates XRG | + 2' 41" |
| 8 | Mattias Skjelmose (DEN) | Lidl–Trek | + 2' 45" |
| 9 | Paul Seixas (FRA) | Decathlon CMA CGM | + 2' 45" |
| 10 | Harold Tejada (COL) | XDS Astana Team | + 3' 22" |

General classification after stage 19
| Rank | Rider | Team | Time |
|---|---|---|---|
| 1 | Tadej Pogačar (SLO) | UAE Team Emirates XRG | 67h 53' 00" |
| 2 | Remco Evenepoel (BEL) | Red Bull–Bora–Hansgrohe | + 7' 11" |
| 3 | Isaac del Toro (MEX) | UAE Team Emirates XRG | + 9' 42" |
| 4 | Paul Seixas (FRA) | Decathlon CMA CGM | + 10' 06" |
| 5 | Lenny Martinez (FRA) | Team Bahrain Victorious | + 13' 00" |
| 6 | Mattias Skjelmose (DEN) | Lidl–Trek | + 13' 09" |
| 7 | Juan Ayuso (ESP) | Lidl–Trek | + 15' 58" |
| 8 | Richard Carapaz (ECU) | EF Education–EasyPost | + 21' 15" |
| 9 | Tom Pidcock (GBR) | Pinarello–Q36.5 Pro Cycling Team | + 21' 30" |
| 10 | Jordan Jegat (FRA) | Team TotalEnergies | + 23' 21" |

== Stage 20 ==
25 July 2026 – Le Bourg-d'Oisans to Alpe d'Huez, 170.9 km (106.2 mi)

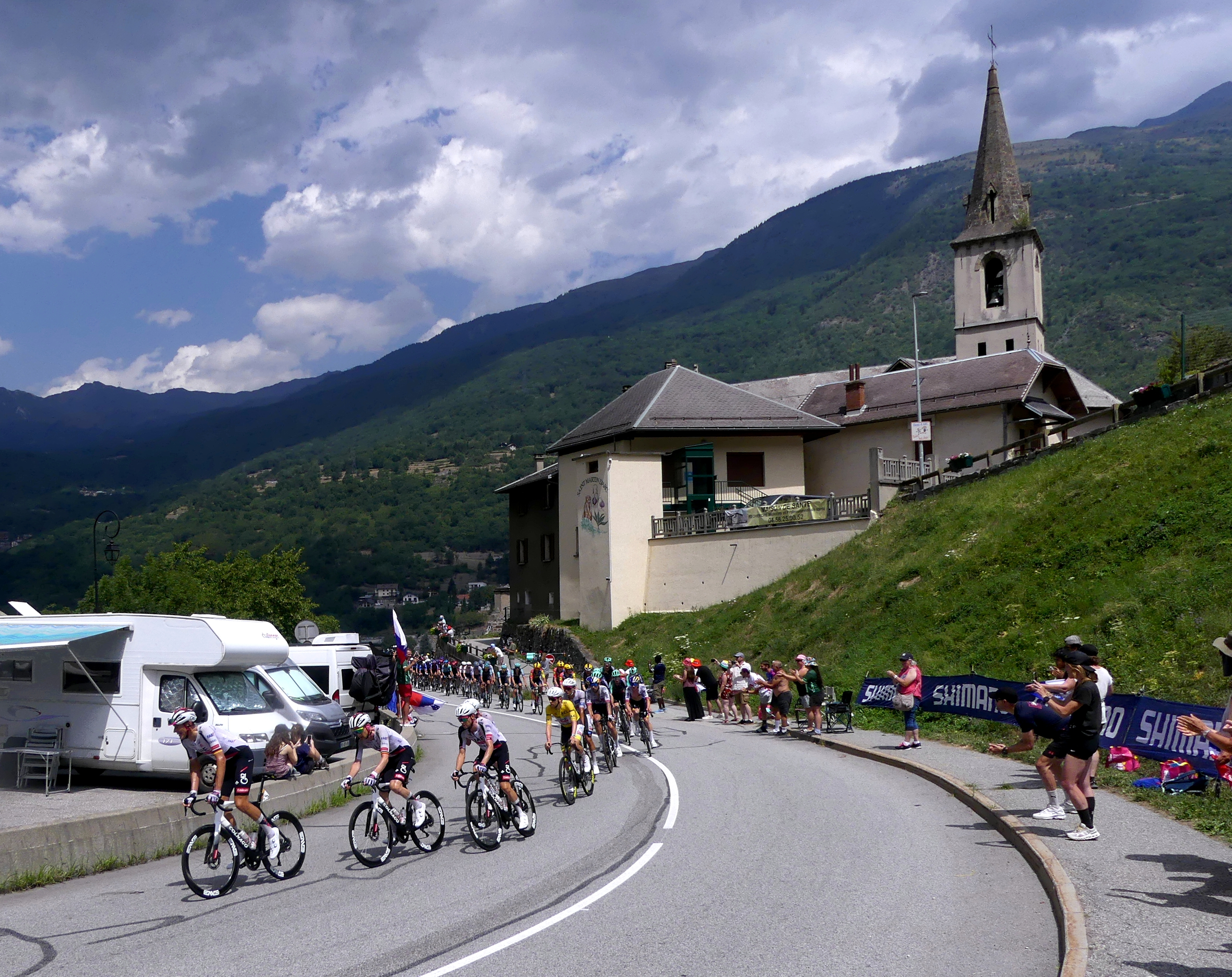
The yellow jersey group in Saint-Martin-d'Arc, prior to the ascent of the Col du Télégraphe

Considered the queen stage of the race, the twentieth stage of the stage from Le Bourg-d'Oisans to Alpe d'Huez had four categorised climbs over 170.9 km (106.2 mi), with around 5,450 m (17,880 ft) of elevation gain. The hors catégorie Col de la Croix de Fer (24 km at an average gradient of 5.2%) was followed by the first-category Col du Télégraphe (11.9 km at an average gradient of 7.1%), the hors catégorie Col du Galibier (17.7 km at an average gradient of 6.9%, with the summit at an elevation of 2,642 m (8,668 ft)), and the hors catégorie Col de Sarenne (12.8 km at an average gradient of 7.3%), before an uncategorised ascent to the finish at Alpe d'Huez (3.7 km at an average gradient of 6.2%).

Stage 20 result
| Rank | Rider | Team | Time |
|---|---|---|---|
| 1 | Richard Carapaz (ECU) | EF Education–EasyPost | 4h 59' 39" |
| 2 | Remco Evenepoel (BEL) | Red Bull–Bora–Hansgrohe | + 26" |
| 3 | Sepp Kuss (USA) | Visma–Lease a Bike | + 31" |
| 4 | Tadej Pogačar (SLO) | UAE Team Emirates XRG | + 1' 05" |
| 5 | Isaac del Toro (MEX) | UAE Team Emirates XRG | + 1' 05" |
| 6 | Lenny Martinez (FRA) | Team Bahrain Victorious | + 1' 07" |
| 7 | Jai Hindley (AUS) | Red Bull–Bora–Hansgrohe | + 2' 15" |
| 8 | Mattias Skjelmose (DEN) | Lidl–Trek | + 2' 55" |
| 9 | Juan Ayuso (ESP) | Lidl–Trek | + 2' 55" |
| 10 | Paul Seixas (FRA) | Decathlon CMA CGM | + 2' 55" |

General classification after stage 20
| Rank | Rider | Team | Time |
|---|---|---|---|
| 1 | Tadej Pogačar (SLO) | UAE Team Emirates XRG | 72h 53' 44" |
| 2 | Remco Evenepoel (BEL) | Red Bull–Bora–Hansgrohe | + 6' 26" |
| 3 | Isaac del Toro (MEX) | UAE Team Emirates XRG | + 9' 42" |
| 4 | Paul Seixas (FRA) | Decathlon CMA CGM | + 11' 56" |
| 5 | Lenny Martinez (FRA) | Team Bahrain Victorious | + 13' 02" |
| 6 | Mattias Skjelmose (DEN) | Lidl–Trek | + 14' 59" |
| 7 | Juan Ayuso (ESP) | Lidl–Trek | + 17' 48" |
| 8 | Richard Carapaz (ECU) | EF Education–EasyPost | + 20' 00" |
| 9 | Tom Pidcock (GBR) | Pinarello–Q36.5 Pro Cycling Team | + 29' 28" |
| 10 | Jordan Jegat (FRA) | Team TotalEnergies | + 33' 21" |

== Stage 21 ==
26 July 2026 – Paris (Champs-Élysées) to Paris (Champs-Élysées), 88.7 km (55.1 mi)

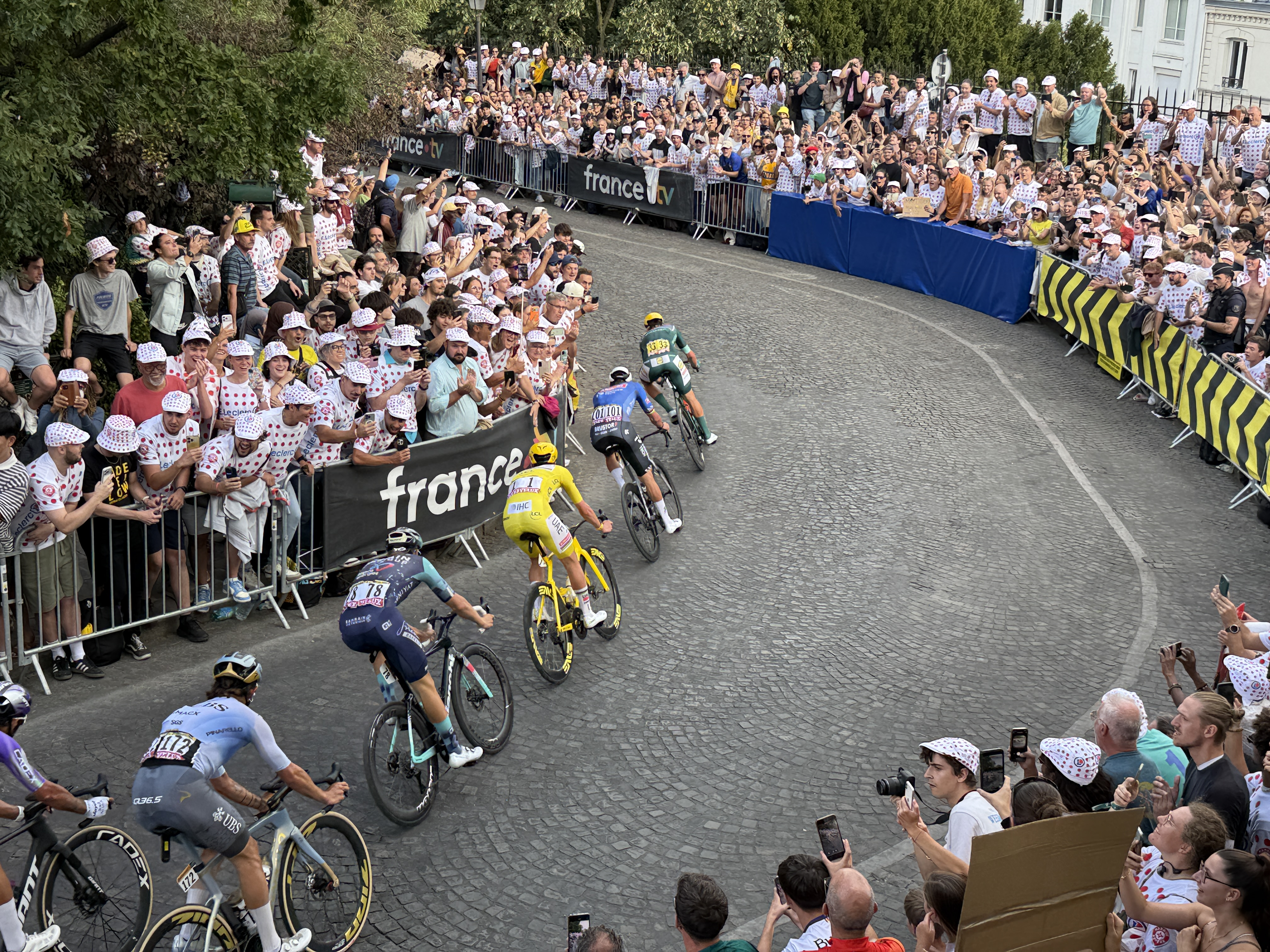
Mads Pedersen, Tadej Pogačar and eventual stage winner Mathieu van der Poel on the Montmartre climb

The twenty-first stage was originally scheduled to be contested over 132.5 km (82.3 mi), from Thoiry to Paris. However, due to a redeployment of security staff to the Gironde department following wildfires, the stage was shortened by 43.8 km (27.2 mi). All pre-stage activities were held in Thoiry, before a bus transfer to Paris, with the stage commencing on the Champs-Élysées. The stage used the Montmartre circuit first used at the Paris 2024 Summer Olympics and the 2025 Tour de France, with the traditional finish line located on the Champs-Élysées. The stage had four fourth-category climbs, with three ascents of the Côte de la Butte Montmartre climb (1.1 km at an average gradient of 6.5%). With 11 km (6.8 mi) from the final summit of the climb to the finish line on the Champs-Élysées, it was considered that sprinters would have a greater chance of contending for the stage victory.

Stage 21 result
| Rank | Rider | Team | Time |
|---|---|---|---|
| 1 | Mathieu van der Poel (NED) | Alpecin–Premier Tech | 1h 58' 49" |
| 2 | Jasper Philipsen (BEL) | Alpecin–Premier Tech | + 0" |
| 3 | Mads Pedersen (DEN) | Lidl–Trek | + 0" |
| 4 | Max Kanter (GER) | XDS Astana Team | + 0" |
| 5 | Olav Kooij (NED) | Decathlon CMA CGM | + 0" |
| 6 | Matej Mohorič (SLO) | Team Bahrain Victorious | + 0" |
| 7 | Rick Pluimers (NED) | Tudor Pro Cycling Team | + 0" |
| 8 | Anthony Turgis (FRA) | Team TotalEnergies | + 0" |
| 9 | Milan Fretin (BEL) | Cofidis | + 0" |
| 10 | Clément Russo (FRA) | Groupama–FDJ United | + 0" |

General classification after stage 21
| Rank | Rider | Team | Time |
|---|---|---|---|
| 1 | Tadej Pogačar (SLO) | UAE Team Emirates XRG | 73h 56' 26" |
| 2 | Remco Evenepoel (BEL) | Red Bull–Bora–Hansgrohe | + 6' 26" |
| 3 | Isaac del Toro (MEX) | UAE Team Emirates XRG | + 9' 42" |
| 4 | Paul Seixas (FRA) | Decathlon CMA CGM | + 11' 56" |
| 5 | Lenny Martinez (FRA) | Team Bahrain Victorious | + 13' 02" |
| 6 | Mattias Skjelmose (DEN) | Lidl–Trek | + 14' 59" |
| 7 | Juan Ayuso (ESP) | Lidl–Trek | + 17' 48" |
| 8 | Richard Carapaz (ECU) | EF Education–EasyPost | + 20' 00" |
| 9 | Tom Pidcock (GBR) | Pinarello–Q36.5 Pro Cycling Team | + 29' 28" |
| 10 | Jordan Jegat (FRA) | Team TotalEnergies | + 33' 21" |
