= Cycling Team–Titanedi–Frezza Acca Due O =

Italian cycling team

Team information
- UCI code: TFA
- Registered: Italy
- Founded: 2008
- Disbanded: 2008
- Discipline: Road
- Status: UCI Women's Team

Team name history
- 2008: Cycling Team–Titanedi–Frezza Acca Due O

Cycling Team–Titanedi–Frezza Acca Due O (UCI team code: TFA) was an Italian professional cycling team, which competed in elite road bicycle racing events such as the UCI Women's Road World Cup.

== Major wins ==
2008
Stages 2 & 3 Tour de Pologne Feminin, Giorgia Bronzini
Stage 7 La Route de France Féminine, Giorgia Bronzini
Stages 1, 2, 3 & 4 Trophée d'Or Féminin, Giorgia Bronzini
Züri Metzgete, Giorgia Bronzini
