= Tom Southam =

Personal information
- Full name: Tom Southam
- Born: 28 May 1981 (age 45)
- Height: 1.85 m (6 ft 1 in)
- Weight: 72 kg (159 lb; 11.3 st)

Cycling career
- Sport: Cycling
- Current team: Retired
- Discipline: Road
- Role: Rider
- Rider type: Strong

Amateur team
- Nantes 44

Professional teams
- 2003–2004: Amore e Vita
- 2005–2006: Barloworld
- 2007: Drapac–Porsche Development Program
- 2008: Team Halfords Bikehut
- 2009–2011: Rapha Condor

Tom Southam (born 28 May 1981) is a British former competitive cyclist from Penzance, Cornwall who competed professionally between 2003 and 2011. He represented Great Britain in five World Championships and rode in several UCI ProTour events. Southam currently works as a directeur sportif for the World Tour team EF Pro Cycling.

Southam has a master's degree in Professional Writing from University College Falmouth and co-wrote the book Domestique: The True Life Ups and Downs of a Tour Pro with former team-mate Wegelius. The book was nominated for the William Hill Sports Book of the Year award in 2013. He has also written for magazines including Rouleur and Procycling. He retired from full-time racing in October 2011, remaining with his final team Rapha Condor–Sharp as their press officer. He also worked as the team's assistant manager, twice guiding riders to overall victory in the Tour de Korea, before agreeing to join another former team, Drapac Professional Cycling, as sports director at the end of 2014. In October 2016 it was announced that Southam would move to a directeur sportif role at Cannondale–Drapac for 2017 due to the merger of the Cannondale and Drapac squads.

During the 2005 UCI Road World Championships in Madrid, Southam agreed to join Charly Wegelius in riding under instructions for the Italian team rather than in support of longshot British leader Roger Hammond. British Cycling performance director Dave Brailsford stipulated that neither rider would likely ride for the British national team again. Southam returned to race for Great Britain team at the 2008 Tour of Britain.

== Palmarès ==
2002
2nd British National Road Race Championships

2004
2nd British National Road Race Championships
2nd Haut Anjou
2nd Trophy Trios Provinces

1st Stage of the Trophy Trios Provinces

2nd Tour de Gironde
20th Tour of Britain

7th King of the Mountains, Tour of Britain

2008
10th Grand Prix of Wales

2009
1st Tour Series Criterium – Colchester
