= Jessica Allen =

Welsh racing cyclist

Personal information
- Full name: Jessica Allen
- Born: 21 August 1989 (age 37) Wales
- Height: 1.60 m (5 ft 3 in)

Cycling career
- Sport: Cycling
- Current team: Team Halfords Bikehut
- Disciplines: Road & Track
- Role: Rider

Amateur team
- 2004–: Abergavenny Road Club

Professional team
- 2008: Team Halfords Bikehut

Jessica Allen (born 21 August 1989) is a Welsh racing cyclist.

She was born in Brecon; her mother Julie (née Munslow) hails from Ammanford. After being spotted by the Welsh Talent Team, she was selected for the Olympic Development Programme in 2006. She was British Junior Time Trial Champion in 2006 and later British Junior Points Race and Time Trial Champion in 2007. She was a 1st category rider and was in 2008 ranked fifth in the UK.

== Palmarès ==
2006
1st (United Kingdom) British National Time Trial Championships – Junior
2nd Welsh National Road Race Championships

2007
1st (United Kingdom) Points Race British National Track Championships – Junior
1st (United Kingdom) British National Time Trial Championships – Junior

2008
4th British National Road Race Championships

2nd U23 British National Road Race Championships
