= Bogumiła Matusiak =

Polish cyclist

Personal information
- Born: 24 January 1971 (age 55) Pabianice, Poland
- Height: 1.64 m (5 ft 5 in)
- Weight: 58 kg (128 lb)

Cycling career
- Sport: Cycling
- Discipline: Road cycling

Professional team
- 2008: Primus

Bogumiła Matusiak (born 24 January 1971 in Pabianice) is a road cyclist from Poland. She is 25 times Polish champion. She represented her nation at UCI Road World Championships between 1994 and 2008 about every year. Matusiak competed for Poland at the 2004 Summer Olympics.
