= Catherine Williamson (cyclist) =

British cyclist

Catherine Hare Williamson
Personal information
- Born: 13 March 1982 (age 44) Great Britain

Cycling career
- Sport: Cycling
- Discipline: Road cycling

Professional team
- 2008: Team Halfords Bikehut

Catherine Hare Williamson (13 March 1982; Bridgend, Wales) is a Welsh cyclist, a resident of Whitby, and a participant of TransCape and Giro d'Italia. She participated at the 2005, 2007, 2010 and 2011 UCI Road World Championships.
