= Katheryn Curi =

American cyclist

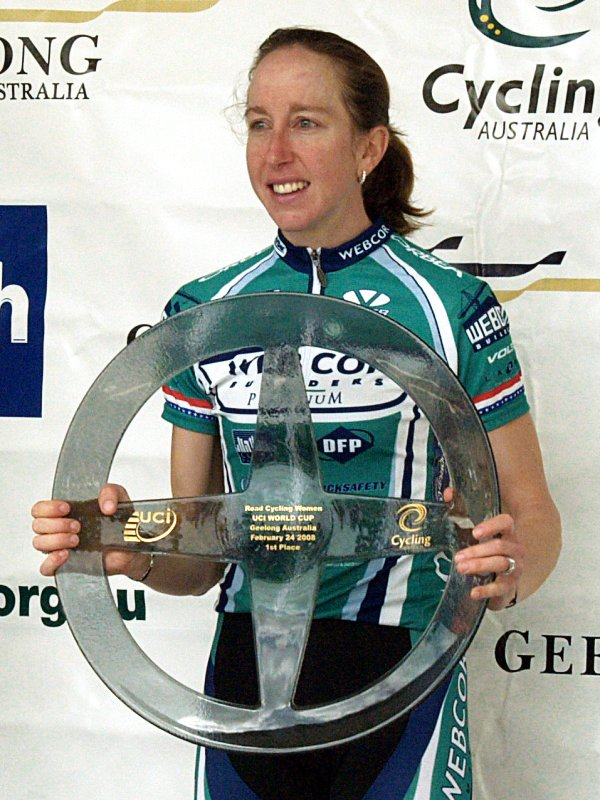
- On the podium at the 2008 Geelong World Cup

Personal information
- Full name: Katheryn Curi
- Born: May 29, 1974 (age 52) United States

Cycling career
- Sport: Cycling
- Discipline: Road
- Role: Rider

Katheryn Curi (formerly Katheryn Curi Mattis; born May 29, 1974, in Goshen, Connecticut) is an American former professional racing cyclist who rode for the Webcor Builders Women's Professional Cycling Team, until the sponsor discontinued it before the 2011 season. She won the United States National Road Race Championships in Park City, Utah, in June 2005. In February 2008 she won the Geelong World Cup thereby claiming the UCI World Cup leader's jersey.

Curi received a B.A. in psychology from Mount Holyoke College in 1996 and began competing as a professional cyclist in 1999.. She stopped racing professionally in 2015. Since retirement from professional racing and as of 2021, Curi has served as Road Team Director, and from 2019 as a board member, of the Amy D. Foundation, which "encourages and supports young women through cycling". She has been active in the bicycling community of Santa Clara County and San Mateo County of California.
