= Robbe Dhondt =

Belgian cyclist (born 2002)

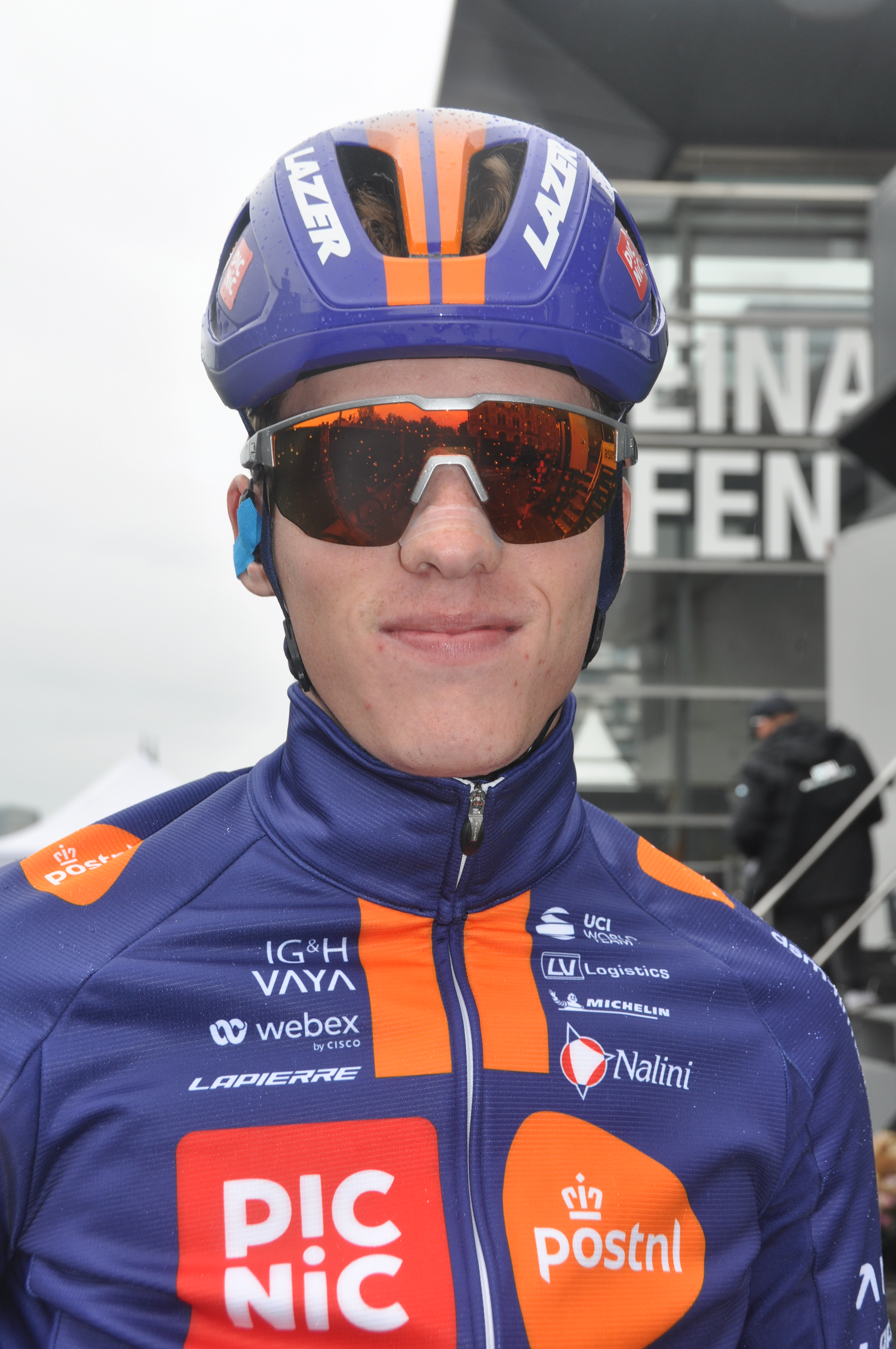
- Dhondt at the 2026 Rund um Köln

Personal information
- Born: 25 June 2004 (age 22) Zottegem, Belgium
- Height: 1.76 m (5 ft 9 in)

Cycling career
- Sport: Cycling
- Current team: Team Picnic–PostNL
- Discipline: Road
- Role: Rider

Amateur team
- 2021–2022: Onder Ons Parike WZW

Professional teams
- 2023–2024: Development Team DSM
- 2025–: Team Picnic–PostNL

Robbe Dhondt (born 25 June 2004) is a Belgian cyclist, who currently rides for UCI WorldTeam Team Picnic–PostNL.

== Major results ==
2021
1st Young rider classification, Tour du Valromey
2022
4th Road race, European Junior Road Championships
7th GP Luxembourg
8th Overall Gipuzkoa Klasika

1st Stage 2

8th Overall Tour du Pays de Vaud
2024
5th Time trial, National Under-23 Road Championships
