= Fellering =

- Commune
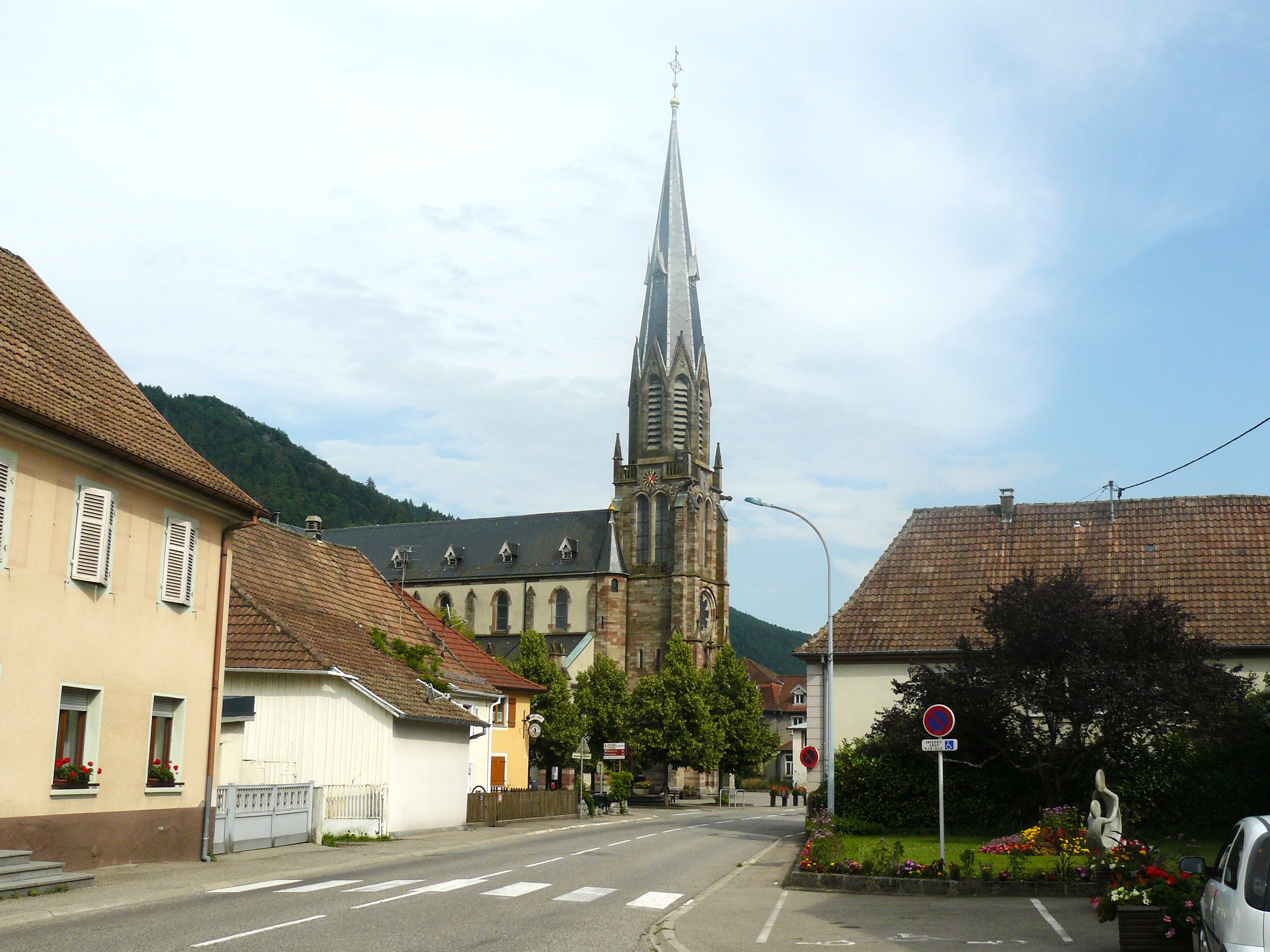
- The church in Fellering

- Coat of arms
- Location of Fellering
- Location within France Location within Grand Est
- Coordinates: 47°53′49″N 6°59′14″E
- Country: France
- Region: Grand Est
- Department: Haut-Rhin
- Arrondissement: Thann-Guebwiller
- Canton: Cernay
- Intercommunality: Vallée de Saint-Amarin

Government
  - Mayor (2020–2026): Nadine Spetz
- Area^{1}: 21.29 km^{2} (8.22 sq mi)
- Elevation: 440 m (1,440 ft)
- Highest elevation: 1,265 m (4,150 ft)
- Lowest elevation: 426 m (1,398 ft)
- Population (2023): 1,569
  - Density: 73.70/km^{2} (190.9/sq mi)
- Time zone: UTC+01:00 (CET)
  - Summer (DST): UTC+02:00 (CEST)
- INSEE/Postal code: 68089 /68470
- ^{1} French Land Register data, which excludes lakes, ponds, glaciers > 1 km^{2} (0.386 sq mi or 247 acres) and river estuaries.

Fellering (French pronunciation: [fɛlʁɛ̃]; German: Felleringen; Alsatian: Falleri) is a commune in the Haut-Rhin department in Grand Est in north-eastern France.

== Geography ==
=== Climate ===
Fellering has a humid continental climate (Köppen climate classification Dfb) closely bordering on a subarctic climate (Dfc). The average annual temperature in Fellering is 6.0 °C (42.8 °F). The average annual rainfall is 1,523.3 mm (59.97 in) with December as the wettest month. The temperatures are highest on average in August, at around 14.2 °C (57.6 °F), and lowest in January, at around −1.5 °C (29.3 °F). The highest temperature ever recorded in Fellering was 30.3 °C (86.5 °F) on 7 August 2015; the coldest temperature ever recorded was −20.4 °C (−4.7 °F) on 20 December 2009.

Climate data for Le Markstein, Fellering (1981–2010 averages, extremes 1994−present)
Month	Jan	Feb	Mar	Apr	May	Jun	Jul	Aug	Sep	Oct	Nov	Dec	Year
Record high °C (°F)	13.7 (56.7)	17.1 (62.8)	18.7 (65.7)	21.8 (71.2)	25.4 (77.7)	30.2 (86.4)	30.2 (86.4)	30.3 (86.5)	25.2 (77.4)	22.6 (72.7)	17.7 (63.9)	14.0 (57.2)	30.3 (86.5)
Mean daily maximum °C (°F)	0.9 (33.6)	1.2 (34.2)	3.5 (38.3)	7.9 (46.2)	12.5 (54.5)	16.0 (60.8)	17.4 (63.3)	17.4 (63.3)	13.1 (55.6)	9.8 (49.6)	4.2 (39.6)	1.3 (34.3)	8.8 (47.8)
Daily mean °C (°F)	−1.5 (29.3)	−1.3 (29.7)	0.9 (33.6)	4.8 (40.6)	9.2 (48.6)	12.5 (54.5)	14.0 (57.2)	14.2 (57.6)	10.2 (50.4)	7.1 (44.8)	2.0 (35.6)	−0.9 (30.4)	6.0 (42.8)
Mean daily minimum °C (°F)	−3.8 (25.2)	−3.7 (25.3)	−1.8 (28.8)	1.7 (35.1)	6.0 (42.8)	9.1 (48.4)	10.7 (51.3)	11.0 (51.8)	7.3 (45.1)	4.5 (40.1)	−0.3 (31.5)	−3.2 (26.2)	3.2 (37.8)
Record low °C (°F)	−14.9 (5.2)	−18.9 (−2.0)	−16.5 (2.3)	−9.5 (14.9)	−3.5 (25.7)	−0.5 (31.1)	3.4 (38.1)	1.8 (35.2)	−1.1 (30.0)	−8.3 (17.1)	−14.0 (6.8)	−20.4 (−4.7)	−20.4 (−4.7)
Average precipitation mm (inches)	139.5 (5.49)	131.5 (5.18)	128.8 (5.07)	86.2 (3.39)	121.7 (4.79)	105.3 (4.15)	128.8 (5.07)	123.0 (4.84)	119.3 (4.70)	140.1 (5.52)	133.9 (5.27)	165.2 (6.50)	1,523.3 (59.97)
Average precipitation days (≥ 1.0 mm)	12.2	12.6	13.0	12.1	13.6	12.1	13.1	12.1	11.4	12.6	13.7	14.1	152.5
Source: Meteociel

== Population ==
Historical population
Year	Pop.	±% p.a.
1968	1,401	—
1975	1,343	−0.60%
1982	1,454	+1.14%
1990	1,501	+0.40%
1999	1,548	+0.34%
2007	1,711	+1.26%
2012	1,704	−0.08%
2017	1,606	−1.18%
2023	1,569	−0.39%
Source: INSEE

== See also ==
- Communes of the Haut-Rhin département
