= Primus (cycling team) =

Polish women's cycling team

Team information
- UCI code: PRI
- Registered: Poland
- Founded: 2008
- Disbanded: 2008
- Discipline: Road
- Status: UCI Women's Team

Team name history
- 2008: Primus

Primus (UCI team code: PRI) was a Polish professional cycling team, which competed in elite road bicycle racing events such as the UCI Women's Road World Cup.

== Major wins ==
2008
Klasyczny-Nałęczów, Katarzyna Bodanka

== National champions ==
2008
Poland Time Trial, Bogumiła Matusiak
