= Team Lot-et-Garonne =

French cycling team

Team information
- UCI code: TLG (2008)
- Registered: France
- Founded: 2008
- Disbanded: 2008
- Discipline: Road
- Status: UCI Women's Team

Key personnel
- General manager: Nicolas Coudray
- Team managers: Daniel Gastou; Germain Riberprey

Team name history
- 2008: Team Lot-et-Garonne

Team Lot-et-Garonne (UCI team code: TLG) was a French professional cycling team, which competed in elite road bicycle racing events such as the UCI Women's Road World Cup.
