= France at the European Road Championships =

- IOC code: FRA
- Medals: Gold 20 Silver 27 Bronze 36 Total 83

France at the European Road Championships is an overview of the French results at the European Road Championships. France hosted the European Road Championships once in Apremont in 2001.

== List of medalists ==
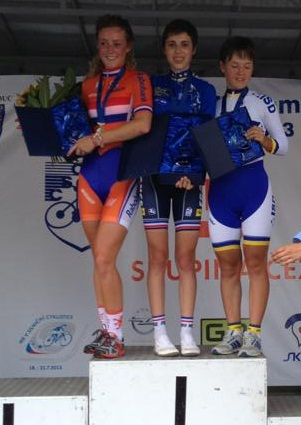
Séverine Eraud won the women's junior time trial in 2013, (Floortje Mackaij (2) and Olena Demidova (3)).

Medal	Championship	Name	Event
Silver	(United Kingdom) 1996 Isle of Man	Elisabeth Chevanne-Brunel	Women's under-23 road race
Gold	(Austria) 1997 Villach	Guillaume Auger	Men's under-23 time trial
Gold	(Austria) 1997 Villach	Elisabeth Chevanne-Brunel	Women's under-23 road race
Bronze	(Portugal) 1999 Lisbon	Nicolas Fritsch	Men's under-23 time trial
Bronze	(France) 2001 Apremont	Sophie Creux	Women's under-23 road race
Bronze	(Italy) 2002 Bergamo	Matthieu Sprick	Men's under-23 road race
Bronze	(Italy) 2002 Bergamo	Virginie Moinard	Women's under-23 road race
Gold	(Greece) 2003 Athens	Virginie Moinard	Women's under-23 time trial
Bronze	(Estonia) 2004 Otepää	Nathalie Tirard Collet	Women's under-23 road race
Gold	(Netherlands) 2006 Valkenburg-Heerlen	Benoît Sinner	Men's under-23 road race
Silver	(Netherlands) 2006 Valkenburg-Heerlen	Jérôme Coppel	Men's under-23 time trial
Silver	(Netherlands) 2006 Valkenburg-Heerlen	Étienne Pieret	Men's junior road race
Silver	(Netherlands) 2006 Valkenburg-Heerlen	Tony Gallopin	Men's junior time trial
Bronze	(Netherlands) 2006 Valkenburg-Heerlen	Julie Krasniak	Women's junior road race
Silver	(Bulgaria) 2007 Sofia	Fabien Taillefer	Men's junior road race
Gold	(Italy) 2008 Verbania	Cyril Gautier	Men's under-23 road race
Gold	(Italy) 2008 Verbania	Johan Le Bon	Men's junior road race
Bronze	(Italy) 2008 Verbania	Johan Le Bon	Men's junior time trial
Gold	(Belgium) 2009 Hooglede-Gits	Pauline Ferrand-Prévot	Women's junior time trial
Bronze	(Belgium) 2009 Hooglede-Gits	Arnaud Démare	Men's junior road race
Bronze	(Belgium) 2009 Hooglede-Gits	Kévin Labèque	Men's junior time trial
Bronze	(Belgium) 2009 Hooglede-Gits	Pauline Ferrand-Prévot	Women's junior road race
Silver	(Turkey) 2010 Ankara	Geoffrey Soupe	Men's under-23 time trial
Silver	(Turkey) 2010 Ankara	Bryan Coquard	Men's junior road race
Silver	(Turkey) 2010 Ankara	Émilien Viennet	Men's junior time trial
Silver	(Turkey) 2010 Ankara	Pauline Ferrand-Prévot	Women's junior road race
Silver	(Turkey) 2010 Ankara	Pauline Ferrand-Prévot	Women's junior time trial
Bronze	(Turkey) 2010 Ankara	Arnaud Démare	Men's under-23 road race
Bronze	(Turkey) 2010 Ankara	Alexia Muffat	Women's junior time trial
Gold	(Italy) 2011 Offida	Yoann Paillot	Men's under-23 time trial
Gold	(Italy) 2011 Offida	Mélodie Lesueur	Women's under-23 time trial
Gold	(Italy) 2011 Offida	Pierre-Henri Lecuisinier	Men's junior road race
Silver	(Italy) 2011 Offida	Olivier Le Gac	Men's junior road race
Silver	(Italy) 2011 Offida	Alexis Gougeard	Men's junior time trial
Silver	(Italy) 2011 Offida	Mathilde Favre	Women's junior time trial
Silver	(Netherlands) 2012 Goes	Anthony Turgis	Men's junior road race
Gold	(Czech Republic) 2013 Olomouc	Frank Bonnamour	Men's junior road race
Gold	(Czech Republic) 2013 Olomouc	Gréta Richioud	Women's junior road race
Gold	(Czech Republic) 2013 Olomouc	Séverine Eraud	Women's junior time trial
Silver	(Czech Republic) 2013 Olomouc	Elie Gesbert	Men's junior road race
Silver	(Czech Republic) 2013 Olomouc	Séverine Eraud	Women's junior road race
Bronze	(Czech Republic) 2013 Olomouc	Rémi Cavagna	Men's junior time trial
Silver	(Switzerland) 2014 Nyon	Séverine Eraud	Women's under-23 time trial
Silver	(Switzerland) 2014 Nyon	Corentin Ermenault	Men's junior time trial
Bronze	(Switzerland) 2014 Nyon	Anthony Turgis	Men's under-23 road race
Bronze	(Switzerland) 2014 Nyon	Annabelle Dreville	Women's under-23 road race
Bronze	(Switzerland) 2014 Nyon	Greta Richioud	Women's junior time trial

== Medal table ==
=== Medals by year ===
Championship	Gold	Silver	Bronze	Total	Rank
(United Kingdom) 1996 Isle of Man	0	1	0	1	
(Austria) 1997 Villach	2	0	0	2	
(Portugal) 1999 Lisbon	0	0	1	1	
(France) 2001 Apremont	0	0	1	1	
(Italy) 2002 Bergamo	0	0	2	2	
(Greece) 2003 Athens	1	0	0	1	
(Estonia) 2004 Otepää	0	0	1	1	
(Netherlands) 2006 Valkenburg-Heerlen	1	3	1	5	
(Bulgaria) 2007 Sofia	0	1	0	1	
(Italy) 2008 Verbania	2	0	1	3	
(Belgium) 2009 Hooglede-Gits	1	0	3	4	
(Turkey) 2010 Ankara	0	5	2	7	
(Italy) 2011 Offida	3	3	0	6	
(Netherlands) 2012 Goes	0	1	0	1	
(Czech Republic) 2013 Olomouc	3	2	1	6	
(Switzerland) 2014 Nyon	0	2	3	5	5
Total	13	18	16	47	

=== Medals by discipline ===
updated after the 2014 European Road Championships

Event	Gold	Silver	Bronze	Total	Rank
Men's under-23 road race	2	0	3	5	
Men's under-23 time trial	2	2	1	5	
Women's under-23 road race	1	1	4	6	
Women's under-23 time trial	2	1	0	3	
Men's junior road race	3	6	2	11	
Men's junior time trial	0	4	3	7	
Women's junior road race	1	2	2	5	
Women's junior time trial	2	2	2	6	
Total	13	18	16	47	

== See also ==
Other countries at the European Road Championships

- Italy at the European Road Championships
- Netherlands at the European Road Championships
- Sweden at the European Road Championships
- Ukraine at the European Road Championships
