= Sweden at the European Road Championships =

- IOC code: SWE
- Medals: Gold 2 Silver 6 Bronze 2 Total 10

Sweden at the European Road Championships is an overview of the Swedish results at the European Road Championships. Sweden hosted the European Road Championships in Uppsala in 1998.

== List of medalists ==
Medal	Championship	Name	Event
Silver	(Austria) 1997 Villach	Izasqun Bengoa	Women's under-23 time trial
Gold	(Sweden) 1998 Uppsala	Susanne Ljungskog	Women's under-23 road race
Silver	(Sweden) 1998 Uppsala	Susanne Ljungskog	Women's under-23 time trial
Silver	(Poland) 2000 Kielce	Stefan Adamsson	Men's under-23 road race
Gold	(Italy) 2002 Bergamo	Jonas Olsson	Men's under-23 time trial
Gold	(Estonia) 2004 Otepää	Monica Holler	Women's under-23 road race
Silver	(Russia) 2005 Moscow	Monica Holler	Women's under-23 road race
Bronze	(Netherlands) 2006 Valkenburg-Heerlen	Monica Holler	Women's under-23 road race
Silver	(Belgium) 2009 Hooglede-Gits	Emilia Fahlin	Women's under-23 time trial
Silver	(Turkey) 2010 Ankara	Emilia Fahlin	Women's under-23 time trial

== Most successful Swedish competitors ==
Name	Medals	Championships
Monica Holler	1 gold, 1 silver, 1 bronze	(gold) 2004 – Women's under-23 road race (silver) 2005 – Women's under-23 road race (bronze) 2006 – Women's under-23 road race
Susanne Ljungskog	1 gold, 1 silver, 0 bronze	(gold) 2008 – Women's under-23 road race (silver) 2008 – Women's under-23 time trial

== Medal table ==
=== Medals by year ===
Championship	Gold	Silver	Bronze	Total	Rank
(Austria) 1997 Villach	0	1	0	1	
(Sweden) 1998 Uppsala	1	1	0	2	
(Poland) 2000 Kielce	0	1	0	1	
(Italy) 2002 Bergamo	1	0	0	1	
(Estonia) 2004 Otepää	0	0	1	1	
(Russia) 2005 Moscow	0	1	0	1	
(Netherlands) 2006 Valkenburg-Heerlen	0	0	1	1	
(Belgium) 2009 Hooglede-Gits	0	1	0	1	
(Turkey) 2010 Ankara	0	1	0	1	
Total	2	6	2	10	

=== Medals by discipline ===
updated after the 2014 European Road Championships

Event	Gold	Silver	Bronze	Total	Rank
Men's under-23 road race	0	1	0	1	
Men's under-23 time trial	1	0	0	1	
Women's under-23 road race	2	1	1	4	
Women's under-23 time trial	0	4	0	4	
Men's junior road race	0	0	0	0	-
Men's junior time trial	0	0	0	0	-
Women's junior road race	0	0	0	0	-
Women's junior time trial	0	0	0	0	-
Total	13	16	13	42	

== See also ==
- France at the European Road Championships
- Italy at the European Road Championships
- Netherlands at the European Road Championships
- Ukraine at the European Road Championships
