= European Road Cycling Championships =

Annual road cycling championships

- The champion's jersey

Race details
- Region: Europe
- Discipline: Road
- Competition: UCI Europe Tour
- Web site: uec.ch

History
- First edition: 1995
- Most recent: 2026

The European Road Cycling Championships (Officially:UEC Road European Championships) are the set of European championship events for the various disciplines and distances in road cycling and have been regulated by the European Cycling Union since 1995.

== History ==
The championships are for under-23, junior (since 2005) and Elite riders (since 2016). The championships include a road race and an individual time trial since 1997, with women's events shorter than men's and junior's events shorter than under-23's. Championships are open to riders selected by their national cycling governing body. They compete in the colours of their country. As with national road race championships and the UCI Road World Championships, the winners are entitled to wear a special champion's jersey when racing throughout the year; in the case of the European Championship, a white jersey with blue bands and yellow stars, modelled on the flag of Europe, a symbolism and design adopted by both the Council of Europe and the European Union and widely used to represent the continent in sport.

== Editions ==
#	Year	Country	City		Category	Events
#	Year	Country	Road race	Time trial	Category	Events
1	1995	Czech Republic	Trutnov	—	Under-23	2
2	1996	United Kingdom	Isle of Man	—	Under-23	2
3	1997	Austria	Villach		Under-23	4
4	1998	Sweden	Uppsala		Under-23	4
5	1999	Portugal	Lisbon		Under-23	4
6	2000	Poland	Kielce		Under-23	4
7	2001	France	Apremont		Under-23	4
8	2002	Italy	Bergamo	Grassobbio	Under-23	4
9	2003	Greece	Athens	Vouliagmeni	Under-23	4
10	2004	Estonia	Otepää		Under-23	4
11	2005	Russia	Moscow		Under-23, Junior	8
12	2006	Netherlands	Valkenburg	Heerlen; Valkenburg	Under-23, Junior	8
13	2007	Bulgaria	Sofia		Under-23, Junior	8
14	2008	Italy	Verbania; Pallanza	Arona; Stresa	Under-23, Junior	8
15	2009	Belgium	Hooglede-Gits		Under-23, Junior	8
16	2010	Turkey	Ankara		Under-23, Junior	8
17	2011	Italy	Offida		Under-23, Junior	8
18	2012	Netherlands	Goes		Under-23, Junior	8
19	2013	Czech Republic	Olomouc		Under-23, Junior	8
20	2014	Switzerland	Nyon		Under-23, Junior	8
21	2015	Estonia	Tartu		Under-23, Junior	8
22	2016	France	Plumelec		Elite, Under-23, Junior	12
23	2017	Denmark	Herning		Elite, Under-23, Junior	12
24	2018	Czech Republic	Zlín	Brno	Under-23, Junior	8
24	2018	United Kingdom	Glasgow		Elite	4
25	2019	Netherlands	Alkmaar		Elite, Under-23, Junior, Mixed	13
26	2020	France	Plouay		Elite, Under-23, Junior, Mixed	13
27	2021	Italy	Trento		Elite, Under-23, Junior, Mixed	13
28	2022	Portugal	Anadia		Under-23, Junior	10
28	2022	Germany	Munich		Elite	4
29	2023	Netherlands	Drenthe		Elite, Under-23, Junior, Mixed	14
30	2024	Belgium	Limburg		Elite, Under-23, Junior, Mixed	14
31	2025	France	Guilherand-Granges		Elite, Under-23, Junior, Mixed	14
32	2026	Slovenia	Ljubljana		Elite, Under-23, Junior, Mixed	14
33	2027	TBD	TBD		Elite, Under-23, Junior, Mixed	14
34	2028	Netherlands	North Brabant		Elite, Under-23, Junior, Mixed	14

== Medals (1995-2026) ==
Rank	Nation	Gold	Silver	Bronze	Total
1	Italy	49	45	43	137
2	Netherlands	44	27	29	100
3	France	22	32	40	94
4	Germany	21	28	24	73
5	Belgium	21	22	22	65
6	Russia	18	14	18	50
7	Denmark	15	13	7	35
8	Switzerland	15	12	10	37
9	Spain	10	5	7	22
10	Ukraine	9	11	6	26
11	Poland	8	9	7	24
12	Norway	7	9	7	23
13	Slovenia	6	3	6	15
14	Great Britain	5	6	3	14
15	Czech Republic	4	4	4	12
16	Sweden	3	7	3	13
17	Lithuania	3	4	8	15
18	Slovakia	2	0	3	5
19	Luxembourg	1	4	2	7
20	Belarus	1	3	3	7
21	Latvia	1	2	3	6
22	Austria	1	1	4	6
23	Portugal	1	1	2	4
24	Finland	1	1	1	3
25	Croatia	1	1	0	2
26	Estonia	0	2	3	5
26	Ireland	0	2	3	5
28	Hungary	0	1	1	2
Totals (28 entries)		269	269	269	807

== Men's events ==
=== Men's elite road race ===
Year	Gold	Silver	Bronze
2016	Peter Sagan; Slovakia	Julian Alaphilippe; France	Daniel Moreno; Spain
2017	Alexander Kristoff; Norway	Elia Viviani; Italy	Moreno Hofland; Netherlands
2018	Matteo Trentin; Italy	Mathieu van der Poel; Netherlands	Wout van Aert; Belgium
2019	Elia Viviani; Italy	Yves Lampaert; Belgium	Pascal Ackermann; Germany
2020	Giacomo Nizzolo; Italy	Arnaud Démare; France	Pascal Ackermann; Germany
2021	Sonny Colbrelli; Italy	Remco Evenepoel; Belgium	Benoît Cosnefroy; France
2022	Fabio Jakobsen; Netherlands	Arnaud Démare; France	Tim Merlier; Belgium
2023	Christophe Laporte; France	Wout van Aert; Belgium	Olav Kooij; Netherlands
2024	Tim Merlier; Belgium	Olav Kooij; Netherlands	Madis Mihkels; Estonia
2025	Tadej Pogačar; Slovenia	Remco Evenepoel; Belgium	Paul Seixas; France
2026	Remco Evenepoel; Belgium	Giulio Ciccone; Italy	Christian Scaroni; Italy

Medallists by nation
Rank	Nation	Gold	Silver	Bronze	Total
1	Italy	4	2	1	7
2	Belgium	2	4	2	8
3	France	1	3	2	6
4	Netherlands	1	2	2	5
5	Norway	1	0	0	1
5	Slovakia	1	0	0	1
5	Slovenia	1	0	0	1
8	Germany	0	0	2	2
9	Estonia	0	0	1	1
9	Spain	0	0	1	1
Totals (10 entries)		11	11	11	33

Top multi medallists
Rank	Athlete	Gold	Silver	Bronze	Total
1	Remco Evenepoel (BEL)	1	2	0	3
2	Elia Viviani (ITA)	1	1	0	2
3	Tim Merlier (BEL)	1	0	1	2
4	Arnaud Démare (FRA)	0	2	0	2
5	Olav Kooij (NED)	0	1	1	2
5	Wout van Aert (BEL)	0	1	1	2
7	Pascal Ackermann (GER)	0	0	2	2

Updated after the 2026 European Road Championships

=== Men's elite time trial ===
Year	Gold	Silver	Bronze
2016	Jonathan Castroviejo; Spain	Victor Campenaerts; Belgium	Moreno Moser; Italy
2017	Victor Campenaerts; Belgium	Maciej Bodnar; Poland	Ryan Mullen; Ireland
2018	Victor Campenaerts; Belgium	Jonathan Castroviejo; Spain	Max Schachmann; Germany
2019	Remco Evenepoel; Belgium	Kasper Asgreen; Denmark	Edoardo Affini; Italy
2020	Stefan Küng; Switzerland	Rémi Cavagna; France	Victor Campenaerts; Belgium
2021	Stefan Küng; Switzerland	Filippo Ganna; Italy	Remco Evenepoel; Belgium
2022	Stefan Bissegger; Switzerland	Stefan Küng; Switzerland	Filippo Ganna; Italy
2023	Josh Tarling; Great Britain	Stefan Bissegger; Switzerland	Wout van Aert; Belgium
2024	Edoardo Affini; Italy	Stefan Küng; Switzerland	Mattia Cattaneo; Italy
2025	Remco Evenepoel; Belgium	Filippo Ganna; Italy	Niklas Larsen; Denmark
2026	Primož Roglič; Slovenia	Bruno Armirail; France	Maxime Decomble; France

Medallists by nation
Rank	Nation	Gold	Silver	Bronze	Total
1	Belgium	4	1	3	8
2	Switzerland	3	3	0	6
3	Italy	1	2	4	7
4	Spain	1	1	0	2
5	Great Britain	1	0	0	1
5	Slovenia	1	0	0	1
7	France	0	2	1	3
8	Denmark	0	1	1	2
9	Poland	0	1	0	1
10	Germany	0	0	1	1
10	Ireland	0	0	1	1
Totals (11 entries)		11	11	11	33

Top multi medallists
Rank	Athlete	Gold	Silver	Bronze	Total
1	Stefan Küng (SUI)	2	2	0	4
2	Victor Campenaerts (BEL)	2	1	1	4
3	Remco Evenepoel (BEL)	2	0	1	3
4	Jonathan Castroviejo (ESP)	1	1	0	2
4	Stefan Bissegger (SUI)	1	1	0	2
6	Edoardo Affini (ITA)	1	0	1	2

Updated after the 2026 European Road Championships

=== Men's U23 road race ===
Year	Gold	Silver	Bronze
1995	Mirko Celestino; Italy	Romāns Vainšteins; Latvia	Giuliano Figueras; Italy
1996	Cândido Barbosa; Portugal	Daniele Contrini; Italy	Sergei Ivanov; Russia
1997	Salvatore Commesso; Italy	Sven Montgomery; Switzerland	Gerrit Glomser; Austria
1998	Zoran Klemenčič; Slovenia	Andy Vidts; Belgium	Raphael Schweda; Germany
1999	Michele Gobbi; Italy	Luca Paolini; Italy	Fabio Bulgarelli; Italy
2000	Graziano Gasparre; Italy	Stefan Adamsson; Sweden	Lorenzo Bernucci; Italy
2001	Giampaolo Caruso; Italy	Eric Baumann; Germany	Roman Luhovyy; Ukraine
2002	Michael Albasini; Switzerland	Mikhail Timochine; Russia	Matthieu Sprick; France
2003	Giovanni Visconti; Italy	Jérémy Roy; France	Kristjan Fajt; Slovenia
2004	Kalvis Eisaks; Latvia	Tom Veelers; Netherlands	Arturs Ansons; Latvia
2005	František Raboň; Czech Republic	Anders Lund; Denmark	Nick Ingels; Belgium
2006	Benoît Sinner; France	Rene Mandri; Estonia	Francesco Gavazzi; Italy
2007	Andrey Klyuev; Russia	Ignatas Konovalovas; Lithuania	Normunds Lasis; Latvia
2008	Cyril Gautier; France	Paul Voß; Germany	Timofey Kritsky; Russia
2009	Kris Boeckmans; Belgium	Jarosław Marycz; Poland	Sacha Modolo; Italy
2010	Piotr Gawroński; Poland	Nelson Oliveira; Portugal	Arnaud Démare; France
2011	Julian Kern; Germany	Siarhei Novikau; Belarus	Kanstantsin Klimiankou; Belarus
2012	Jan Tratnik; Slovenia	Andžs Flaksis; Latvia	Wouter Wippert; Netherlands
2013	Sean De Bie; Belgium	Petr Vakoč; Czech Republic	Toms Skujiņš; Latvia
2014	Stefan Küng; Switzerland	Iuri Filosi; Italy	Anthony Turgis; France
2015	Erik Baška; Slovakia	Mamyr Stash; Russia	Davide Martinelli; Italy
2016	Aleksandr Riabushenko; Belarus	Bjorg Lambrecht; Belgium	Andrea Vendrame; Italy
2017	Casper Pedersen; Denmark	Benoît Cosnefroy; France	Marc Hirschi; Switzerland
2018	Marc Hirschi; Switzerland	Victor Lafay; France	Fernando Barceló; Spain
2019	Alberto Dainese; Italy	Niklas Larsen; Denmark	Rait Ärm; Estonia
2020	Jonas Iversby Hvideberg; Norway	Anthon Charmig; Denmark	Vojtěch Řepa; Czech Republic
2021	Thibau Nys; Belgium	Filippo Baroncini; Italy	Juan Ayuso; Spain
2022	Felix Engelhardt; Germany	Mathias Vacek; Czech Republic	Davide De Pretto; Italy
2023	Henrik Breiner Pedersen; Denmark	Iván Romeo; Spain	Paul Magnier; France
2024	Huub Artz; Netherlands	Niklas Behrens; Germany	Léandre Lozouet; France
2025	Jarno Widar; Belgium	Maxime Decomble; France	Héctor Álvarez; Spain
2026	Héctor Álvarez; Spain	Jan Jackowiak; Poland	Niels Driesen; Belgium

Medallists by nation
Rank	Nation	Gold	Silver	Bronze	Total
1	Italy	7	4	8	19
2	Belgium	4	2	2	8
3	Switzerland	3	1	1	5
4	France	2	4	5	11
5	Germany	2	3	1	6
6	Denmark	2	3	0	5
7	Slovenia	2	0	1	3
8	Latvia	1	2	3	6
9	Russia	1	2	2	5
10	Czech Republic	1	2	1	4
11	Poland	1	2	0	3
12	Spain	1	1	3	5
13	Belarus	1	1	1	3
13	Netherlands	1	1	1	3
15	Portugal	1	1	0	2
16	Norway	1	0	0	1
16	Slovakia	1	0	0	1
18	Estonia	0	1	1	2
19	Lithuania	0	1	0	1
19	Sweden	0	1	0	1
21	Austria	0	0	1	1
21	Ukraine	0	0	1	1
Totals (22 entries)		32	32	32	96

Top multi medallists
Rank	Athlete	Gold	Silver	Bronze	Total
1	Héctor Álvarez (ESP)	1	0	1	2
1	Marc Hirschi (SUI)	1	0	1	2

Updated after the 2026 European Road Championships

=== Men's U23 time trial ===
Year	Gold	Silver	Bronze
1997	Guillaume Auger; France	Fabio Malberti; Italy	Maurizio Caravaggio; Italy
1998	Oleg Zhukov; Russia	Marco Pinotti; Italy	László Bodrogi; Hungary
1999	Martin Cotar; Croatia	Charly Wegelius; Great Britain	Nicolas Fritsch; France
2000	Evgeni Petrov; Russia	Pawel Zugaj; Poland	Dmitri Stemov; Russia
2001	Manuel Quinziato; Italy	Alexander Bespalov; Russia	Sebastian Lang; Germany
2002	Jonas Olsson; Sweden	Alexander Bespalov; Russia	Jure Zrimšek; Slovenia
2003	Markus Fothen; Germany	Jure Zrimšek; Slovenia	Vladimir Gusev; Russia
2004	Christian Müller; Germany	Janez Brajkovič; Slovenia	Alexei Esin; Russia
2005	Dmytro Grabovskyy; Ukraine	Dominique Cornu; Belgium	Janez Brajkovič; Slovenia
2006	Dmytro Grabovskyy; Ukraine	Jérôme Coppel; France	Dominique Cornu; Belgium
2007	Maxim Belkov; Russia	Rein Taaramäe; Estonia	Adriano Malori; Italy
2008	Adriano Malori; Italy	Timofey Kritsky; Russia	Artem Ovechkin; Russia
2009	Marcel Kittel; Germany	Timofey Kritsky; Russia	Rasmus Quaade; Denmark
2010	Alex Dowsett; Great Britain	Geoffrey Soupe; France	Nelson Oliveira; Portugal
2011	Yoann Paillot; France	Bob Jungels; Luxembourg	Vegard Stake Laengen; Norway
2012	Rasmus Quaade; Denmark	Bob Jungels; Luxembourg	Oleksandr Golovash; Ukraine
2013	Victor Campenaerts; Belgium	Oleksandr Golovash; Ukraine	Jasha Sütterlin; Germany
2014	Stefan Küng; Switzerland	Davide Martinelli; Italy	Alexander Evtushenko; Russia
2015	Steven Lammertink; Netherlands	Marlen Zmorka; Ukraine	Max Schachmann; Germany
2016	Lennard Kämna; Germany	Filippo Ganna; Italy	Rémi Cavagna; France
2017	Kasper Asgreen; Denmark	Mikkel Bjerg; Denmark	Corentin Ermenault; France
2018	Edoardo Affini; Italy	Izidor Penko; Slovenia	Markus Wildauer; Austria
2019	Johan Price-Pejtersen; Denmark	Mikkel Bjerg; Denmark	Stefan Bissegger; Switzerland
2020	Andreas Leknessund; Norway	Stefan Bissegger; Switzerland	Ilan Van Wilder; Belgium
2021	Johan Price-Pejtersen; Denmark	Søren Wærenskjold; Norway	Daan Hoole; Netherlands
2022	Alec Segaert; Belgium	Fran Miholjević; Croatia	Eddy Le Huitouze; France
2023	Alec Segaert; Belgium	Carl-Frederik Bévort; Denmark	Gustav Wang; Denmark
2024	Alec Segaert; Belgium	Jakob Söderqvist; Sweden	Wessel Mouris; Netherlands
2025	Jonathan Vervenne; Belgium	Matisse Van Kerckhove; Belgium	Adam Rafferty; Ireland
2026	Héctor Álvarez; Spain	Matisse Van Kerckhove; Belgium	Kasper Haugland; Norway

Medallists by nation
Rank	Nation	Gold	Silver	Bronze	Total
1	Belgium	5	3	2	10
2	Denmark	4	3	2	9
3	Germany	4	0	3	7
4	Russia	3	4	5	12
5	Italy	3	4	2	9
6	France	2	2	4	8
7	Ukraine	2	2	1	5
8	Norway	1	1	2	4
9	Switzerland	1	1	1	3
10	Croatia	1	1	0	2
10	Great Britain	1	1	0	2
10	Sweden	1	1	0	2
13	Netherlands	1	0	2	3
14	Spain	1	0	0	1
15	Slovenia	0	3	2	5
16	Luxembourg	0	2	0	2
17	Estonia	0	1	0	1
17	Poland	0	1	0	1
19	Austria	0	0	1	1
19	Hungary	0	0	1	1
19	Ireland	0	0	1	1
19	Portugal	0	0	1	1
Totals (22 entries)		30	30	30	90

Top multi medallists
Rank	Athlete	Gold	Silver	Bronze	Total
1	Alec Segaert (BEL)	3	0	0	3
2	Dmytro Grabovskyy (UKR)	2	0	0	2
2	Johan Price-Pejtersen (DEN)	2	0	0	2
4	Adriano Malori (ITA)	1	0	1	2
4	Rasmus Quaade (DEN)	1	0	1	2
6	Alexander Bespalov (RUS)	0	2	0	2
6	Bob Jungels (LUX)	0	2	0	2
6	Matisse Van Kerckhove (BEL)	0	2	0	2
6	Mikkel Bjerg (DEN)	0	2	0	2
6	Timofey Kritsky (RUS)	0	2	0	2

Updated after the 2026 European Road Championships

== Women's events ==
=== Women's road race ===
Year	Gold	Silver	Bronze
2016	Anna van der Breggen; Netherlands	Katarzyna Niewiadoma; Poland	Elisa Longo Borghini; Italy
2017	Marianne Vos; Netherlands	Giorgia Bronzini; Italy	Olga Zabelinskaya; Russia
2018	Marta Bastianelli; Italy	Marianne Vos; Netherlands	Lisa Brennauer; Germany
2019	Amy Pieters; Netherlands	Elena Cecchini; Italy	Lisa Klein; Germany
2020	Annemiek van Vleuten; Netherlands	Elisa Longo Borghini; Italy	Katarzyna Niewiadoma; Poland
2021	Ellen van Dijk; Netherlands	Liane Lippert; Germany	Rasa Leleivytė; Lithuania
2022	Lorena Wiebes; Netherlands	Elisa Balsamo; Italy	Rachele Barbieri; Italy
2023	Mischa Bredewold; Netherlands	Lorena Wiebes; Netherlands	Lotte Kopecky; Belgium
2024	Lorena Wiebes; Netherlands	Elisa Balsamo; Italy	Daria Pikulik; Poland
2025	Demi Vollering; Netherlands	Katarzyna Niewiadoma; Poland	Anna van der Breggen; Netherlands
2026	Demi Vollering; Netherlands	Puck Pieterse; Netherlands	Marlen Reusser; Switzerland

Medallists by nation
Rank	Nation	Gold	Silver	Bronze	Total
1	Netherlands	10	3	1	14
2	Italy	1	5	2	8
3	Poland	0	2	2	4
4	Germany	0	1	2	3
5	Belgium	0	0	1	1
5	Lithuania	0	0	1	1
5	Russia	0	0	1	1
5	Switzerland	0	0	1	1
Totals (8 entries)		11	11	11	33

Top multi medallists
Rank	Athlete	Gold	Silver	Bronze	Total
1	Lorena Wiebes (NED)	2	1	0	3
2	Demi Vollering (NED)	2	0	0	2
3	Marianne Vos (NED)	1	1	0	2
4	Anna van der Breggen (NED)	1	0	1	2
5	Katarzyna Niewiadoma (POL)	0	2	1	3
6	Elisa Balsamo (ITA)	0	2	0	2
7	Elisa Longo Borghini (ITA)	0	1	1	2

Updated after the 2026 European Road Championships

=== Women's time trial ===
Year	Gold	Silver	Bronze
2016	Ellen van Dijk; Netherlands	Anna van der Breggen; Netherlands	Olga Zabelinskaya; Russia
2017	Ellen van Dijk; Netherlands	Ann-Sophie Duyck; Belgium	Anna van der Breggen; Netherlands
2018	Ellen van Dijk; Netherlands	Anna van der Breggen; Netherlands	Trixi Worrack; Germany
2019	Ellen van Dijk; Netherlands	Lisa Klein; Germany	Lucinda Brand; Netherlands
2020	Anna van der Breggen; Netherlands	Ellen van Dijk; Netherlands	Marlen Reusser; Switzerland
2021	Marlen Reusser; Switzerland	Ellen van Dijk; Netherlands	Lisa Brennauer; Germany
2022	Marlen Reusser; Switzerland	Ellen van Dijk; Netherlands	Riejanne Markus; Netherlands
2023	Marlen Reusser; Switzerland	Anna Henderson; Great Britain	Christina Schweinberger; Austria
2024	Lotte Kopecky; Belgium	Ellen van Dijk; Netherlands	Christina Schweinberger; Austria
2025	Marlen Reusser; Switzerland	Mie Ottestad; Norway	Mischa Bredewold; Netherlands
2026	Marlen Reusser; Switzerland	Demi Vollering; Netherlands	Juliette Berthet; France

Medallists by nation
Rank	Nation	Gold	Silver	Bronze	Total
1	Netherlands	5	7	4	16
2	Switzerland	5	0	1	6
3	Belgium	1	1	0	2
4	Germany	0	1	2	3
5	Great Britain	0	1	0	1
5	Norway	0	1	0	1
7	Austria	0	0	2	2
8	France	0	0	1	1
8	Russia	0	0	1	1
Totals (9 entries)		11	11	11	33

Top multi medallists
Rank	Athlete	Gold	Silver	Bronze	Total
1	Marlen Reusser (SUI)	5	0	1	6
2	Ellen van Dijk (NED)	4	4	0	8
3	Anna van der Breggen (NED)	1	2	1	4
4	Christina Schweinberger (AUT)	0	0	2	2

Updated after the 2026 European Road Championships

=== Women's U23 road race ===
Year	Gold	Silver	Bronze
1995	Regina Schleicher; Germany	Evi Gensheimer; Germany	Elena Unruh; Germany
1996	Hanka Kupfernagel; Germany	Diana Žiliūtė; Lithuania	Élisabeth Chevanne Brunel; France
1997	Élisabeth Chevanne Brunel; France	Tetyana Styazhkina; Ukraine	Izaskun Bengoa; Spain
1998	Susanne Ljungskog; Sweden	Diana Žiliūtė; Lithuania	Mirella van Melis; Netherlands
1999	Tetyana Styazhkina; Ukraine	Oksana Saprykina; Ukraine	Nicole Brändli; Switzerland
2000	Alessandra D'Ettorre; Italy	Mirella van Melis; Netherlands	Vera Carrara; Italy
2001	Mirella van Melis; Netherlands	Angela Hennig-Brodtka; Germany	Sophie Creux; France
2002	Trixi Worrack; Germany	Evy Van Damme; Belgium	Virginie Moinard; France
2003	María Isabel Moreno; Spain	Theresa Senff; Germany	Vera Koedooder; Netherlands
2004	Monica Holler; Sweden	Bertine Spijkerman; Netherlands	Nathalie Tirard-Collet; France
2005	Gessica Turato; Italy	Monica Holler; Sweden	Modesta Vžesniauskaitė; Lithuania
2006	Marianne Vos; Netherlands	Tatiana Guderzo; Italy	Monica Holler; Sweden
2007	Marianne Vos; Netherlands	Marta Bastianelli; Italy	Rasa Leleivytė; Lithuania
2008	Rasa Leleivytė; Lithuania	Lesya Kalytovska; Ukraine	Marta Bastianelli; Italy
2009	Chantal Blaak; Netherlands	Katie Colclough; Great Britain	Marianne Vos; Netherlands
2010	Noortje Tabak; Netherlands	Lesya Kalytovska; Ukraine	Aušrinė Trebaitė; Lithuania
2011	Larisa Pankova; Russia	Alena Amialiusik; Belarus	Lucinda Brand; Netherlands
2012	Evelyn Arys; Belgium	Barbara Guarischi; Italy	Kim de Baat; Netherlands
2013	Susanna Zorzi; Italy	Francesca Cauz; Italy	Hanna Solovey; Ukraine
2014	Sabrina Stultiens; Netherlands	Elena Cecchini; Italy	Annabelle Dreville; France
2015	Katarzyna Niewiadoma; Poland	Ilaria Sanguineti; Italy	Thalita de Jong; Netherlands
2016	Katarzyna Niewiadoma; Poland	Cecilie Uttrup Ludwig; Denmark	Séverine Eraud; France
2017	Pernille Mathiesen; Denmark	Susanne Andersen; Norway	Alice Barnes; Great Britain
2018	Nikola Nosková; Czech Republic	Aafke Soet; Netherlands	Letizia Paternoster; Italy
2019	Letizia Paternoster; Italy	Marta Lach; Poland	Lonneke Uneken; Netherlands
2020	Elisa Balsamo; Italy	Lonneke Uneken; Netherlands	Emma Norsgaard Jørgensen; Denmark
2021	Silvia Zanardi; Italy	Kata Blanka Vas; Hungary	Évita Muzic; France
2022	Shirin van Anrooij; Netherlands	Vittoria Guazzini; Italy	Fem van Empel; Netherlands
2023	Ilse Pluimers; Netherlands	Anna Shackley; Great Britain	Linda Zanetti; Switzerland
2024	Sofie van Rooijen; Netherlands	Scarlett Souren; Netherlands	Eleonora Gasparrini; Italy
2025	Paula Blasi; Spain	Eleonora Ciabocco; Italy	Julie Bego; France
2026	Mara Winter; Switzerland	Nienke Vinke; Netherlands	Viktória Chladoňová; Slovakia

Medallists by nation
Rank	Nation	Gold	Silver	Bronze	Total
1	Netherlands	9	6	8	23
2	Italy	6	8	4	18
3	Germany	3	3	1	7
4	Sweden	2	1	1	4
5	Poland	2	1	0	3
6	Spain	2	0	1	3
7	Ukraine	1	4	1	6
8	Lithuania	1	2	3	6
9	Denmark	1	1	1	3
10	Belgium	1	1	0	2
11	France	1	0	8	9
12	Switzerland	1	0	2	3
13	Czech Republic	1	0	0	1
13	Russia	1	0	0	1
15	Great Britain	0	2	1	3
16	Belarus	0	1	0	1
16	Hungary	0	1	0	1
16	Norway	0	1	0	1
19	Slovakia	0	0	1	1
Totals (19 entries)		32	32	32	96

Top multi medallists
Rank	Athlete	Gold	Silver	Bronze	Total
1	Marianne Vos (NED)	2	0	1	3
2	Katarzyna Niewiadoma (POL)	2	0	0	2
3	Mirella van Melis (NED)	1	1	1	3
3	Monica Holler (SWE)	1	1	1	3
5	Tetyana Styazhkina (UKR)	1	1	0	2
6	Letizia Paternoster (ITA)	1	0	1	2
6	Rasa Leleivytė (LTU)	1	0	1	2
6	Élisabeth Chevanne Brunel (FRA)	1	0	1	2

Updated after the 2026 European Road Championships

=== Women's U23 time trial ===
Year	Gold	Silver	Bronze
1997	Diana Žiliūtė; Lithuania	Izaskun Bengoa; Spain	Jenny Algelid; Sweden
1998	Diana Žiliūtė; Lithuania	Susanne Ljungskog; Sweden	Rasa Mažeikytė; Lithuania
1999	Tetyana Styazhkina; Ukraine	Nicole Brändli; Switzerland	Ceris Gilfillan; Great Britain
2000	Lada Kozlíková; Czech Republic	Ceris Gilfillan; Great Britain	Nicole Brändli; Switzerland
2001	Nicole Brändli; Switzerland	Lada Kozlíková; Czech Republic	Olga Zabelinskaya; Russia
2002	Olga Zabelinskaya; Russia	Vera Carrara; Italy	Vera Koedooder; Netherlands
2003	Virginie Moinard; France	Madeleine Sandig; Germany	María Isabel Moreno; Spain
2004	Tatiana Guderzo; Italy	Madeleine Sandig; Germany	Anna Zugno; Italy
2005	Madeleine Sandig; Germany	Tatiana Guderzo; Italy	Anna Zugno; Italy
2006	Linda Villumsen; Denmark	Tatiana Guderzo; Italy	Bianca Knöpfle; Germany
2007	Linda Villumsen; Denmark	Svitlana Halyuk; Ukraine	Martina Sáblíková; Czech Republic
2008	Ellen van Dijk; Netherlands	Svitlana Halyuk; Ukraine	Lesya Kalytovska; Ukraine
2009	Ellen van Dijk; Netherlands	Emilia Fahlin; Sweden	Marianne Vos; Netherlands
2010	Alexandra Burchenkova; Russia	Emilia Fahlin; Sweden	Kataržina Sosna; Lithuania
2011	Mélodie Lesueur; France	Larisa Pankova; Russia	Kataržina Sosna; Lithuania
2012	Anna van der Breggen; Netherlands	Mieke Kröger; Germany	Elisa Longo Borghini; Italy
2013	Hanna Solovey; Ukraine	Rossella Ratto; Italy	Kseniya Dobrynina; Russia
2014	Mieke Kröger; Germany	Séverine Eraud; France	Ramona Forchini; Switzerland
2015	Mieke Kröger; Germany	Olga Shekel; Ukraine	Corinna Lechner; Germany
2016	Anastasiia Yakovenko; Russia	Ksenyia Tuhai; Belarus	Lisa Klein; Germany
2017	Pernille Mathiesen; Denmark	Cecilie Uttrup Ludwig; Denmark	Lisa Klein; Germany
2018	Aafke Soet; Netherlands	Lisa Klein; Germany	Nikola Nosková; Czech Republic
2019	Hannah Ludwig; Germany	Maria Novolodskaya; Russia	Elena Pirrone; Italy
2020	Hannah Ludwig; Germany	Franziska Koch; Germany	Marta Jaskulska; Poland
2021	Vittoria Guazzini; Italy	Hannah Ludwig; Germany	Elena Pirrone; Italy
2022	Shirin van Anrooij; Netherlands	Vittoria Guazzini; Italy	Marie Le Net; France
2023	Zoe Backstedt; Great Britain	Antonia Niedermaier; Germany	Anniina Ahtosalo; Finland
2024	Anniina Ahtosalo; Finland	Antonia Niedermaier; Germany	Marie Schreiber; Luxembourg
2025	Federica Venturelli; Italy	Anniina Ahtosalo; Finland	Luca Vierstraete; Belgium
2026	Nienke Vinke; Netherlands	Megan Arens; Netherlands	Viktória Chladoňová; Slovakia

Medallists by nation
Rank	Nation	Gold	Silver	Bronze	Total
1	Netherlands	6	1	2	9
2	Germany	5	8	4	17
3	Italy	3	5	5	13
4	Russia	3	2	2	7
5	Denmark	3	1	0	4
6	Ukraine	2	3	1	6
7	France	2	1	1	4
8	Lithuania	2	0	3	5
9	Czech Republic	1	1	2	4
9	Switzerland	1	1	2	4
11	Finland	1	1	1	3
11	Great Britain	1	1	1	3
13	Sweden	0	3	1	4
14	Spain	0	1	1	2
15	Belarus	0	1	0	1
16	Belgium	0	0	1	1
16	Luxembourg	0	0	1	1
16	Poland	0	0	1	1
16	Slovakia	0	0	1	1
Totals (19 entries)		30	30	30	90

Top multi medallists
Rank	Athlete	Gold	Silver	Bronze	Total
1	Hannah Ludwig (GER)	2	1	0	3
1	Mieke Kröger (GER)	2	1	0	3
3	Diana Žiliūtė (LTU)	2	0	0	2
3	Ellen van Dijk (NED)	2	0	0	2
3	Linda Villumsen (DEN)	2	0	0	2
6	Madeleine Sandig (GER)	1	2	0	3
6	Tatiana Guderzo (ITA)	1	2	0	3
8	Anniina Ahtosalo (FIN)	1	1	1	3
8	Nicole Brändli (SUI)	1	1	1	3
10	Lada Kozlíková (CZE)	1	1	0	2
10	Vittoria Guazzini (ITA)	1	1	0	2
12	Olga Zabelinskaya (RUS)	1	0	1	2

Updated after the 2026 European Road Championships

== Mixed events ==
=== Mixed time trial relay ===
Year	Gold	Silver	Bronze
2019	Netherlands; Bauke Mollema; Amy Pieters; Ramon Sinkeldam; Floortje Mackaij; Koen Bouwman; Riejanne Markus	Germany; Lisa Klein; Jasha Sütterlin; Mieke Kröger; Justin Wolf; Lisa Brennauer; Marco Mathis	Italy; Vittoria Guazzini; Edoardo Affini; Elisa Longo Borghini; Manuele Boaro; Silvia Valsecchi; Davide Martinelli
2020	Germany; Lisa Brennauer; Lisa Klein; Mieke Kröger; Miguel Heidemann; Michel Hessmann; Justin Wolf	Switzerland; Elise Chabbey; Marlen Reusser; Kathrin Stirnemann; Stefan Bissegger; Robin Froidevaux; Claudio Imhof	Italy; Vittoria Bussi; Elena Cecchini; Vittoria Guazzini; Edoardo Affini; Liam Bertazzo; Davide Plebani
2021	Italy; Matteo Sobrero; Filippo Ganna; Alessandro De Marchi; Elena Cecchini; Marta Cavalli; Elisa Longo Borghini	Germany; Miguel Heidemann; Justin Wolf; Max Walscheid; Corinna Lechner; Mieke Kröger; Tanja Erath	Netherlands; Koen Bouwman; Jos van Emden; Bauke Mollema; Floortje Mackaij; Amy Pieters; Demi Vollering
2022	Not held		
2023	France; Bruno Armirail; Rémi Cavagna; Benjamin Thomas; Audrey Cordon-Ragot; Cédrine Kerbaol; Juliette Labous	Italy; Edoardo Affini; Mattia Cattaneo; Matteo Sobrero; Elena Cecchini; Vittoria Guazzini; Soraya Paladin	Germany; Miguel Heidemann; Jannik Steimle; Maximilian Walscheid; Lisa Klein; Franziska Koch; Mieke Kröger
2024	Italy; Edoardo Affini; Mattia Cattaneo; Mirco Maestri; Elena Cecchini; Vittoria Guazzini; Gaia Masetti	Germany; Nils Politt; Jannik Steimle; Maximilian Walscheid; Lisa Klein; Franziska Koch; Mieke Kröger	Belgium; Edward Theuns; Noah Vandenbranden; Victor Vercouillie; Alana Castrique; Marion Norbert-Riberolle; Jesse Vandenbulcke
2025	France; Bruno Armirail; Rémi Cavagna; Thibault Guernalec; Juliette Labous; Cédrine Kerbaol; Marion Borras	Italy; Filippo Ganna; Marco Frigo; Lorenzo Milesi; Federica Venturelli; Vittoria Guazzini; Elena Cecchini	Switzerland; Jan Christen; Stefan Küng; Mauro Schmid; Noemi Rüegg; Marlen Reusser; Jasmin Liechti
2026	France; Bruno Armirail; Rémi Cavagna; Thibault Guernalec; Juliette Berthet; Cédrine Kerbaol; Maëva Squiban	Italy; Mattia Cattaneo; Marco Frigo; Matteo Sobrero; Elisa Longo Borghini; Monica Trinca Colonel; Alessia Vigilia	Luxembourg; Alex Kirsch; Mathieu Kockelmann; Mats Wenzel; Nina Berton; Marie Schreiber; Liv Wenzel

Medallists by nation
Rank	Nation	Gold	Silver	Bronze	Total
1	France	3	0	0	3
2	Italy	2	3	2	7
3	Germany	1	3	1	5
4	Netherlands	1	0	1	2
5	Switzerland	0	1	1	2
6	Belgium	0	0	1	1
6	Luxembourg	0	0	1	1
Totals (7 entries)		7	7	7	21

Top multi medallists
Rank	Athlete	Gold	Silver	Bronze	Total
1	Bruno Armirail (FRA)	3	0	0	3
1	Cédrine Kerbaol (FRA)	3	0	0	3
1	Rémi Cavagna (FRA)	3	0	0	3
4	Elena Cecchini (ITA)	2	2	1	5
5	Juliette Labous (FRA)	2	0	0	2
5	Thibault Guernalec (FRA)	2	0	0	2
7	Mieke Kröger (GER)	1	3	1	5
8	Vittoria Guazzini (ITA)	1	2	2	5
9	Lisa Klein (GER)	1	2	1	4
10	Justin Wolf (GER)	1	2	0	3
10	Matteo Sobrero (ITA)	1	2	0	3
10	Mattia Cattaneo (ITA)	1	2	0	3
13	Edoardo Affini (ITA)	1	1	2	4
14	Elisa Longo Borghini (ITA)	1	1	1	3

Updated after the 2026 European Road Championships

== Junior events ==
- European Road Championships – Men's junior road race
- European Road Championships – Men's junior time trial
- European Road Championships – Women's junior road race
- European Road Championships – Women's junior time trial

== See also ==
- UEC European Track Championships
- European Mountain Bike Championships
- UEC European Cyclo-cross Championships
- European BMX Championships
- Para
- Indoor
- Veterans
