= Ukraine at the European Road Championships =

- IOC code: UKR
- Medals: Gold 8 Silver 10 Bronze 6 Total 24

Ukraine at the European Road Championships is an overview of the Ukrainian results at the European Road Championships.

== List of medalists ==
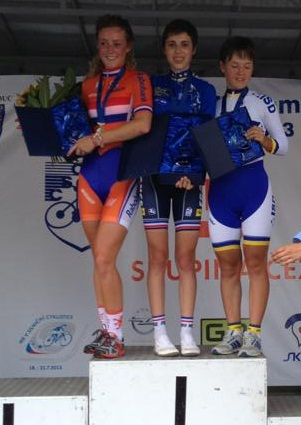
Olena Demidova won the bronze medal in the women's junior time trial in 2013 (Séverine Eraud (1), Floortje Mackaij (2)).

Medal	Championship	Name	Event
Silver	(Austria) 1997 Villach	Tetyana Styazhkina	Women's under-23 road race
Gold	(Portugal) 1999 Lisbon	Tetyana Styazhkina	Women's under-23 road race
Gold	(Portugal) 1999 Lisbon	Tetyana Styazhkina	Women's under-23 time trial
Silver	(Portugal) 1999 Lisbon	Oksana Saprykina	Women's under-23 road race
Bronze	(France) 2001 Apremont	Roman Lougovyi	Men's under-23 road race
Gold	(Russia) 2005 Moscow	Dmytro Grabovskyy	Men's under-23 time trial
Silver	(Russia) 2005 Moscow	Dmytro Grabovskyy	Men's junior time trial
Gold	(Netherlands) 2006 Valkenburg-Heerlen	Dmytro Grabovskyy	Men's under-23 time trial
Gold	(Bulgaria) 2007 Sofia	Valeriya Kononenko	Women's junior time trial
Silver	(Bulgaria) 2007 Sofia	Svitlana Halyuk	Women's under-23 time trial
Gold	(Italy) 2008 Verbania	Valeriya Kononenko	Women's junior time trial
Silver	(Italy) 2008 Verbania	Lesya Kalytovska	Women's under-23 road race
Silver	(Italy) 2008 Verbania	Svitlana Halyuk	Women's under-23 time trial
Silver	(Italy) 2008 Verbania	Valeriya Kononenko	Women's junior road race
Bronze	(Italy) 2008 Verbania	Lesya Kalytovska	Women's under-23 time trial
Silver	(Belgium) 2009 Hooglede-Gits	Hanna Solovey	Women's junior time trial
Gold	(Turkey) 2010 Ankara	Hanna Solovey	Women's junior time trial
Silver	(Turkey) 2010 Ankara	Lesya Kalytovska	Women's under-23 road race
Bronze	(Turkey) 2010 Ankara	Marlen Zmorka	Men's junior time trial
Bronze	(Netherlands) 2012 Goes	Oleksandr Golovash	Men's under-23 time trial
Gold	(Czech Republic) 2013 Olomouc	Hanna Solovey	Women's under-23 time trial
Silver	(Czech Republic) 2013 Olomouc	Oleksandr Golovash	Men's under-23 time trial
Bronze	(Czech Republic) 2013 Olomouc	Hanna Solovey	Women's under-23 road race
Bronze	(Czech Republic) 2013 Olomouc	Olena Demidova	Women's junior time trial

== Medal table ==
=== Medals by year ===
Championship	Gold	Silver	Bronze	Total	Rank
(Austria) 1997 Villach	0	1	0	1	
(Portugal) 1999 Lisbon	2	1	0	3	
(France) 2001 Apremont	0	0	1	1	
(Estonia) 2005 Moscow	1	1	0	2	
(Netherlands) 2006 Valkenburg-Heerlen	1	0	0	1	
(Bulgaria) 2007 Sofia	1	1	0	2	
(Italy) 2008 Verbania	1	3	1	5	
(Belgium) 2009 Hooglede-Gits	0	1	0	1	
(Turkey) 2010 Ankara	1	1	1	3	
(Netherlands) 2012 Goes	0	0	1	1	
(Czech Republic) 2013 Olomouc	1	1	2	4	
Total	8	10	6	24	

=== Medals by discipline ===
updated after the 2014 European Road Championships

Event	Gold	Silver	Bronze	Total	Rank
Men's under-23 road race	0	0	1	1	
Men's under-23 time trial	2	1	1	4	
Women's under-23 road race	1	4	1	6	
Women's under-23 time trial	2	2	1	5	
Men's junior road race	0	0	0	0	-
Men's junior time trial	0	1	1	2	
Women's junior road race	0	1	0	1	
Women's junior time trial	3	1	1	5	
Total	8	10	6	24	

== See also ==
Other countries at the European Road Championships

- France at the European Road Championships
- Italy at the European Road Championships
- Netherlands at the European Road Championships
- Sweden at the European Road Championships
