= 1999 European Road Championships =

- Venue: Lisbon, Portugal
- Date: August 1999
- Events: 4

The 1999 European Road Championships were held in Lisbon, Portugal, in August 1999. Regulated by the European Cycling Union. The event consisted of a road race and time trial for under-23 women and under-23 men.

== Events summary ==
Event	Gold	Silver	Bronze
Men's Under-23 Events
Road race	(Italy) Michele Gobbi	(Italy) Luca Paolini	(Italy) Fabio Bulgarelli
Time trial	(Croatia) Martin Cotar	(United Kingdom) Charly Wegelius	(France) Nicolas Fritsch
Women's Under-23 Events
Road race	(Ukraine) Tatiana Stiajkina	(Ukraine) Oksana Saprykina	(Switzerland) Nicole Brändli
Time trial	(Ukraine) Tatiana Stiajkina	(Switzerland) Nicole Brändli	(United Kingdom) Ceris Gilfillan

== Medal table ==
Rank	Nation	Gold	Silver	Bronze	Total
1	Ukraine (UKR)	2	1	0	3
2	Italy (ITA)	1	1	1	3
3	Croatia (CRO)	1	0	0	1
4	Switzerland (SUI)	0	1	1	2
5	France (FRA)	0	0	1	1
Totals (5 entries)		4	3	3	10
