= 2002 UCI Road World Championships – Men's road race =

Men's Individual Road Race
2002 UCI Road World Championships
- Rainbow jersey

Race details
- Dates: 13 October 2002
- Stages: 1
- Distance: 256 km (159.1 mi)
- Winning time: 5h 30' 03"

Results
	Winner	Mario Cipollini (ITA)	(Italy)
	Second	Robbie McEwen (AUS)	(Australia)
	Third	Erik Zabel (GER)	(Germany)

The men's road race at the 2002 UCI Road World Championships was the 69th edition of the event. The race took place on Sunday 13 October 2002 based around the Circuit Zolder, Belgium. The race was won by Mario Cipollini of Italy.

== Final classification ==
General classification (1–10)

Rank	Rider	Time
1st place, gold medalist(s)	Mario Cipollini (ITA)	5h 30' 03"
2nd place, silver medalist(s)	Robbie McEwen (AUS)	+ 0"
3rd place, bronze medalist(s)	Erik Zabel (GER)	+ 0"
4	Andrej Hauptman (SLO)	+ 0"
5	Zoran Klemenčič (SLO)	+ 0"
6	Jimmy Casper (FRA)	+ 0"
7	Jaan Kirsipuu (EST)	+ 0"
8	Sven Teutenberg (GER)	+ 0"
9	Baden Cooke (AUS)	+ 0"
10	Julian Dean (NZL)	+ 0"
