= 2006 European Road Championships – Women's under-23 road race =

Women's U23 Road Race
2006 European Road Championships
- UEC European Champion jersey

Race details
- Dates: 15 July
- Stages: 1
- Distance: 110 km (68.35 mi)
- Winning time: 03h 07' 06"

Medalists
	Gold	Marianne Vos (Netherlands)
	Silver	Tatiana Guderzo (Italy)
	Bronze	Monica Holler (Sweden)

The Women's U23 road race at the 2006 European Road Championships took place on July 15. The Championships were hosted by the Dutch city of Valkenburg. The course was 110 km long and started in the morning.

== Final classification ==
Rank	Rider	Time
1st place, gold medalist(s)	Marianne Vos (NED)	3h 07m 06s
2nd place, silver medalist(s)	Tatiana Guderzo (ITA)	"
3rd place, bronze medalist(s)	Monica Holler (SWE)	+ 58s
4	Suzanne de Goede (NED)	"
5	Ludivine Henrion (BEL)	"
6	Inga Čilvinaitė (LTU)	"
7	Stephanie Pohl (GER)	"
8	Monia Baccaille (ITA)	"
9	Małgorzata Jasińska (POL)	"
10	Ellen van Dijk (NED)	"
11	Daniela Fusarpoli (ITA)	"
12	Elena Stramousova (RUS)	"
13	Monika Krawczyk (POL)	"
14	Naiara Telletxea Lopez (ESP)	"
15	Marie Lindberg (SWE)	"
16	Pascale Schnider (SUI)	"
17	Loes Markerink (NED)	"
18	Monika Furrer (SUI)	"
19	Yulia Blindyuk (RUS)	"
20	Karine Gautard (FRA)	"
21	Daiva Tušlaitė (LTU)	"
