= 2000 European Road Championships =

- Venue: Kielce, Poland
- Date: 3–5 August 2000
- Events: 4

The 2000 European Road Championships were held in Kielce, Poland, between 3 August and 5 August 2000. Regulated by the European Cycling Union, the event consisted of a road race and a time trial for men and women under-23.

== Schedule ==
=== Individual time trial ===
Friday 3 August 2000

- Women under-23
- Men under-23

=== Road race ===
Sunday 5 August 2000

- Women under-23
- Men under-23

== Events summary ==
Event	Gold		Silver		Bronze	
Men's Under-23 Events
Road race	Graziano Gasparre; Italy	3 h 51 min 47s Average 43,57 km/h	Stefan Adamsson; Sweden	+ 13s	Lorenzo Bernucci; Italy	s.t.
Time trial	Evgeni Petrov; Russia	38 min 19s Average 46,98 km/h	Pawel Zugaj; Poland	+ 9s	Dmitri Stemov; Russia	+ 16s
Women's Under-23 Events
Road race	Alessandra D'Ettore; Italy	2 h 43 min 06s Average 39,4 km/h	Mirella van Melis; Netherlands	s.t.	Vera Carrara; Italy	s.t.
Time trial	Lada Kozlíková; Czech Republic	31 min 23s Average 42,06 km/h	Ceris Gilfillan; United Kingdom	+ 45s	Nicole Brändli; Switzerland	+ 51s

== Medal table ==
Rank	Nation	Gold	Silver	Bronze	Total
1	Italy (ITA)	2	0	2	4
2	Russia (RUS)	1	0	1	2
3	Czech Republic (CZE)	1	0	0	1
4	Great Britain (GBR)	0	1	0	1
4	Netherlands (NLD)	0	1	0	1
4	Poland (POL)	0	1	0	1
4	Sweden (SWE)	0	1	0	1
8	Switzerland (SUI)	0	0	1	1
Totals (8 entries)		4	4	4	12
