= 1996 European Road Championships =

Second edition of the cycling competition

- Venue: Isle of Man, Great Britain
- Date: June 1996
- Events: 2

The 1996 European Road Championships were held in Isle of Man, Great Britain, in mid-June 1996. Regulated by the European Cycling Union, the event consisted of a road race for men and women under 23.

== Schedule ==
=== Road race ===
Tuesday 18 June 1996

- Women U23

- Men U23

== Events summary ==
Event	Gold	Silver	Bronze
Men's Under-23 Events
Road race	Cândido Barbosa; Portugal	Daniele Contrini; Italy	Serguei Ivanov; Russia
Women's Under-23 Events
Road race	Hanka Kupfernagel; Germany	Diana Žiliūtė; Lithuania	Elisabeth Chevanne-Brunel; France

== Medal table ==
Rank	Nation	Gold	Silver	Bronze	Total
1	Germany (GER)	1	0	0	1
1	Portugal (POR)	1	0	0	1
3	Italy (ITA)	0	1	0	1
3	Lithuania (LTU)	0	1	0	1
5	France (FRA)	0	0	1	1
5	Russia (RUS)	0	0	1	1
Totals (6 entries)		2	2	2	6
