= 2002 UCI Road World Championships =

Cycling world championships

- Venue: Limburg, Belgium
- Date: 8–13 October 2002
- Coordinates: 50°58′38.6″N 5°16′43.8″E
- Events: 10

The 2002 UCI Road World Championships took place in the region of Limburg, Belgium, between 8 and 13 October 2002. The event consisted of a road race and a time trial for men, women, men under 23, junior men and junior women.

Location of Limburg, Belgium

== Events summary ==
Event	Gold		Silver		Bronze	
Men's events
Men's road race	Mario Cipollini; Italy	5h30'3"	Robbie McEwen; Australia	s.t.	Erik Zabel; Germany	s.t.
Men's time trial	Santiago Botero; Colombia	48'08"	Michael Rich; Germany	+ 8"	Igor González de Galdeano; Spain	+ 17"
Women's events
Women's road race	Susanne Ljungskog; Sweden	2h59'15"	Nicole Brändli; Switzerland	s.t.	Joane Somarriba; Spain	s.t.
Women's time trial	Zoulfia Zabirova; Russia	30'2"	Nicole Brändli; Switzerland	+ 14"	Karin Thürig; Switzerland	+ 15"
Men's Under-23 Events
Men's under-23 road race	Francesco Chicchi; Italy	3h36'28"	Francisco Gutierrez; Spain	s.t.	David Loosli; Switzerland	s.t.
Men's under-23 time trial	Tomas Vaitkus; Lithuania	38'40"	Alexander Bespalov; Russia	+ 41"	Sérgio Paulinho; Portugal	+ 1'28"
Men's Junior Events
Men's Junior Road Race	Arnaud Gérard; France	2h50'17"	Jukka Vastaranta; Finland	s.t.	Nicolas Sanderson; Australia	s.t.
Men's Junior Time Trial	Mikhail Ignatiev; Russia	28'30"	Mark Jamieson; Australia	+ 10"	Vincenzo Nibali; Italy	+ 25"
Women's Junior Events
Women's Junior Road Race	Suzanne de Goede; Netherlands	1h59'	Claudia Stumpf; Germany	s.t.	Monica Holler; Sweden	s.t.
Women's Junior Time Trial	Anna Zugno; Italy	15'54"	Tatiana Guderzo; Italy	+ 6"	Claudia Hecht; Germany	+ 7"
