= 2003 European Road Championships =

- Venue: Athens, Greece
- Date(s): 15–17 August 2003
- Events: 4

The 2003 European Road Championships were held in Athens, Greece, between 15 August and 17 August 2003. Regulated by the European Cycling Union. The event consisted of a road race and a time trial for men and women under 23.

== Schedule ==
=== Individual time trial ===
Friday 15 August 2003

- Women U23, 24 km
- Men U23, 32 km

=== Road race ===
Sunday 17 August 2003

- Women U23, 105.6
- Men U23, 156.8

== Events summary ==
| Event | Gold | | Silver | | Bronze | |
|---|---|---|---|---|---|---|
Men's Under-23 Events
| Road race | Giovanni Visconti; Italy | 4 h 10 min 31s | Jérémy Roy; France | s.t. | Kristjan Fajt; Slovenia | s.t. |
| Time trial | Markus Fothen; Germany | 41 min 32s | Jure Zrimsek; Slovenia | + 6s | Vladimir Gusev; Russia | + 11s |
Women's Under-23 Events
| Road race | María Isabel Moreno; Spain | 3 h 03 min 28s | Theresa Senff; Germany | + 39s | Vera Koedooder; Netherlands | s.t. |
| Time trial | Virginie Moinard; France | 33 min 29s | Madeleine Sandig; Germany | + 6s | María Isabel Moreno; Spain | + 11s |

== Medal table ==
| Rank | Nation | Gold | Silver | Bronze | Total |
|---|---|---|---|---|---|
| 1 | Germany (GER) | 1 | 2 | 0 | 3 |
| 2 | France (FRA) | 1 | 1 | 0 | 2 |
| 3 | Spain (ESP) | 1 | 0 | 1 | 2 |
| 4 | Italy (ITA) | 1 | 0 | 0 | 1 |
| 5 | Slovenia (SLO) | 0 | 1 | 1 | 2 |
| 6 | Netherlands (NLD) | 0 | 0 | 1 | 1 |
| 6 | Russia (RUS) | 0 | 0 | 1 | 1 |
| Totals (7 entries) | | 4 | 4 | 4 | 12 |
