= 2005 European Road Championships =

- Venue: Moscow, Russia
- Date(s): 7–10 July 2005
- Events: 8

The 2005 European Road Championships were held in Moscow, Russia, between 7 July and 10 July 2005. Regulated by the European Cycling Union. The event consisted of a road race and a time trial for men and women under 23 and juniors.

== Schedule ==
=== Individual time trial ===
Thursday 7 July 2005

- Women U23, 22 km
- Men Juniors, 22 km

Friday 8 July 2005

- Men U23, 33 km
- Women Juniors

=== Road race ===
Saturday 9 July 2005

- Women U23
- Men Juniors

Sunday 10 July 2005

- Men U23, 81.6 km
- Women Juniors

== Events summary ==
Event	Gold		Silver		Bronze	
Men's Under-23 Events
Road race	František Raboň; Czech Republic	4 h 03 min 06s	Anders Lund; Denmark	+ 7s	Nick Ingels; Belgium	s.t.
Time trial	Dmytro Grabovskyy; Ukraine	42 min 46s	Dominique Cornu; Belgium	+ 3s	Janez Brajkovič; Slovenia	+ 14s
Women's Under-23 Events
Road race	Gessica Turato; Italy	3 h 36 min 38s	Monica Holler; Sweden	+ 37s	Modesta Vžesniauskaitė; Lithuania	s.t.
Time trial	Madeleine Sandig; Germany	31 min 26s	Tatiana Guderzo; Italy	+ 22s	Anna Zugno; Italy	+ 40s
Men's Junior Events
Road race	Ivan Rovny; Russia	3 h 07 min 30s	Andrei Solomennikov; Russia	+ 1'08s	Federico Masiero; Italy	+ 1'14s
Time trial	Dmitry Sokolov; Russia	28 min 49s	Yevgeniy Nikolenko; Ukraine	+ 40s	Manuele Boaro; Italy	+ 52s
Women's Junior Events
Road race	Alexandra Burchenkova; Russia	2 h 22 min 26s	Ekaterina Novozhilova; Russia	s.t.	Marta Bastianelli; Italy	+ 1 min 51s
Time trial	Aleksandra Dawidowicz; Poland	15 min 53s	Aušrinė Trebaitė; Lithuania	+ 25s	Lesya Kalytovska; Ukraine	+ 26s

== Medal table ==
Rank	Nation	Gold	Silver	Bronze	Total
1	RUS	3	2	1	6
2	ITA	1	1	4	6
3	UKR	1	1	0	2
4	CZE	1	0	0	1
4	GER	1	0	0	1
4	POL	1	0	0	1
7	BEL	0	1	1	2
7	LTU	0	1	1	2
9	DEN	0	1	0	1
9	SWE	0	1	0	1
11	SLO	0	0	1	1
Totals (11 entries)		8	8	8	24
