= 2004 European Road Championships =

- Venue: Otepää, Estonia
- Date(s): 6–10 August 2004
- Events: 4

The 2004 European Road Championships were held in Otepää, Estonia between 6 August and 10 August 2004, regulated by the European Cycling Union. The event consisted of a road race and a time trial for men and women under 23.

== Schedule ==
=== Individual time trial ===
Friday 6 August 2004

- Women under-23, 23.1 km
- Men under-23, 30.5 km

=== Road race ===
Sunday 10 August 2004

- Women under-23, 119.2 km
- Men under-23, 178.8 km

== Events summary ==
Event	Gold		Silver		Bronze	
Men's Under-23 Events
Road race	Kalvis Eisaks; Latvia	3 h 57 min 58s	Tom Veelers; Netherlands	+ 7s	Arturs Ansons; Latvia	s.t.
Time trial	Christian Müller; Germany	40 min 04s	Janez Brajkovič; Slovenia	+ 31s	Alexei Esin; Russia	+ 42s
Women's Under-23 Events
Road race	Monica Holler; Sweden	3 h 02 min 44s	Bertine Spijkerman; Netherlands	s.t.	Nathalie Tirard Collet; France	s.t.
Time trial	Tatiana Guderzo; Italy	33 min 49s	Madeleine Sandig; Germany	+ 56s	Anna Zugno; Italy	+ 57s

== Medal table ==
Rank	Nation	Gold	Silver	Bronze	Total
1	Germany (GER)	1	1	0	2
2	Italy (ITA)	1	0	1	2
2	Latvia (LAT)	1	0	1	2
4	Sweden (SWE)	1	0	0	1
5	Denmark (DEN)	0	1	0	1
5	Netherlands (NLD)	0	1	0	1
5	Slovenia (SLO)	0	1	0	1
8	France (FRA)	0	0	1	1
8	Russia (RUS)	0	0	1	1
Totals (9 entries)		4	4	4	12
