= Tour de Pologne Women =

Race details
- Date: August
- Region: Poland
- Discipline: Road
- Type: Race stage
- Organiser: Lang Team
- Race director: Czesław Lang
- Web site: tourdepolognewomen.pl

History
- First edition: 1998
- Editions: 15 (as of 2026)
- First winner: Hanka Kupfernagel (GER)
- Most wins: Bogumiła Matusiak (POL) (2 wins)
- Most recent: Lorena Wiebes (NED)

Tour de Pologne Women is a multi-day road cycling race, held annually in Poland. Since the 2026 edition, it has been rated as a UCI Women's ProSeries event.

== Winners ==
Year	Country	Rider	Team
1998	Germany	Hanka Kupfernagel	Germany (national team)
1999	Germany	Judith Arndt	Germany (national team)
2000	Czech Republic	Lada Kozlíková	Czech Republic (national team)
2001	Germany	Christina Becker	Germany (national team)
2002	Ukraine	Valentyna Karpenko	Pragma-Deia-Colnago
2003	Ukraine	Tetyana Styazhkina	Velodames Colnago
2004	Italy	Tatiana Guderzo	Italy (national team)
2005	Poland	Bogumiła Matusiak	Poland (national team)
2006	Poland	Bogumiła Matusiak	Poland (national team)
2007	Netherlands	Kirsten Wild	AA-Drink Cycling Team
2008	Sweden	Sara Mustonen	Team CMAX Dila
2009– 2015	No race		
2016	Switzerland	Jolanda Neff	Switzerland (national team)
2017– 2023	No race		
2024	Netherlands	Laura Molenaar	VolkerWessels Women Cyclingteam
2025	Italy	Chiara Consonni	Canyon//SRAM Zondacrypto
2026	Netherlands	Lorena Wiebes	Team SD Worx–Protime
