= Zoran Klemenčič =

Slovenian cyclist

Personal information
- Born: 28 April 1976 (age 50) Ljubljana, Slovenia

Cycling career
- Sport: Cycling
- Current team: Retired
- Discipline: Road
- Role: Rider
- Rider type: Sprinter

Professional teams
- 1999–2002: Vini Caldirola
- 2003–2005: Tenax
- 2006: Adria Mobil

Zoran Klemenčič (born 28 April 1976 in Ljubljana) is a Slovenian former professional road cyclist.

== Major results ==
1996
1st Stage 6 Tour of Slovenia
4th Trofeo Città di Castelfidardo
1997
1st Stage 7 Okolo Slovenska
1998
1st Road race, European Under-23 Road Championships
1st Stage 3 Settimana Ciclistica Lombarda
1st Stage 8 Tour of Yugoslavia
2000
8th G.P. Costa degli Etruschi
2001
1st Poreč Trophy 2
1st Stage 1 Istrian Spring Trophy
1st Stage 3a Three Days of De Panne
9th Grand Prix Cerami
2002
5th Road race, UCI Road World Championships
2004
1st Prologue & Stage 3 Istrian Spring Trophy
2006
4th Poreč Trophy
