= Marlen Zmorka =

Ukrainian bicycle racer

Personal information
- Full name: Marlen Serverovich Zmorka
- Born: 1 July 1993 (age 33) Mykolaiv, Ukraine

Cycling career
- Sport: Cycling
- Discipline: Road
- Role: Rider
- Rider type: Time-trialist

Amateur team
- 2012–2015: Palazzago Elledent Rad Logistica

Professional teams
- 2016: Skydive Dubai–Al Ahli
- 2017: Amore & Vita–Selle SMP
Medal record
Men's road bicycle racing
Representing Ukraine
European Championships
Silver medal – second place	2015 Tartu	Under-23 time trial
Bronze medal – third place	2010 Ankara	Junior time trial

Marlen Serverovich Zmorka (Ukrainian: Марлен Серверович Зморка; born 1 July 1993) is a Ukrainian racing cyclist. He has twice been a medalist at the European road championships: bronze in 2010 and silver in 2015. He started cycling in 2008, and graduated from the Mykolaiv sports college.

== Major results ==
2010
3rd Time trial, UEC European Junior Road Championships
2012
3rd Road race, National Under-23 Road Championships
4th Memorial Davide Fardelli
5th Time trial, UEC European Under-23 Road Championships
6th Time trial, UCI Under-23 Road World Championships
2013
2nd Time trial, National Under-23 Road Championships
4th Time trial, UEC European Under-23 Road Championships
6th Trofeo Città di San Vendemiano
7th ZLM Tour
8th Gran Premio San Giuseppe
2014
1st Time trial, National Under-23 Road Championships
6th Time trial, UEC European Under-23 Road Championships
8th Circuito del Porto
2015
1st Time trial, National Under-23 Road Championships
2nd Time trial, UEC European Under-23 Road Championships
5th Trofeo Città di San Vendemiano
9th Time trial, UCI Under-23 Road World Championships
2016
1st Stage 1 (TTT) Sharjah International Cycling Tour
4th UAE Cup
