= 2015 European Road Championships =

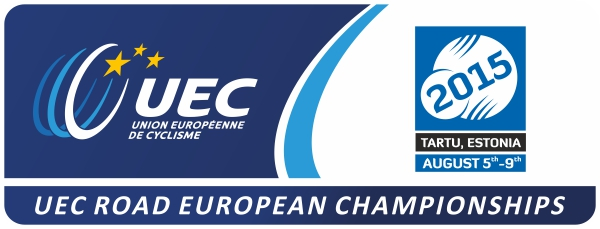

- Location within Estonia
- Venue: Tartu, Estonia
- Date: 6–9 August 2015
- Coordinates: 58°22′N 26°43′E
- Events: 8

The 2015 European Road Championships were held in Tartu, Estonia. The event consisted of a road race and a time trial for men and women under-23 and juniors. The championships were regulated by the European Cycling Union.

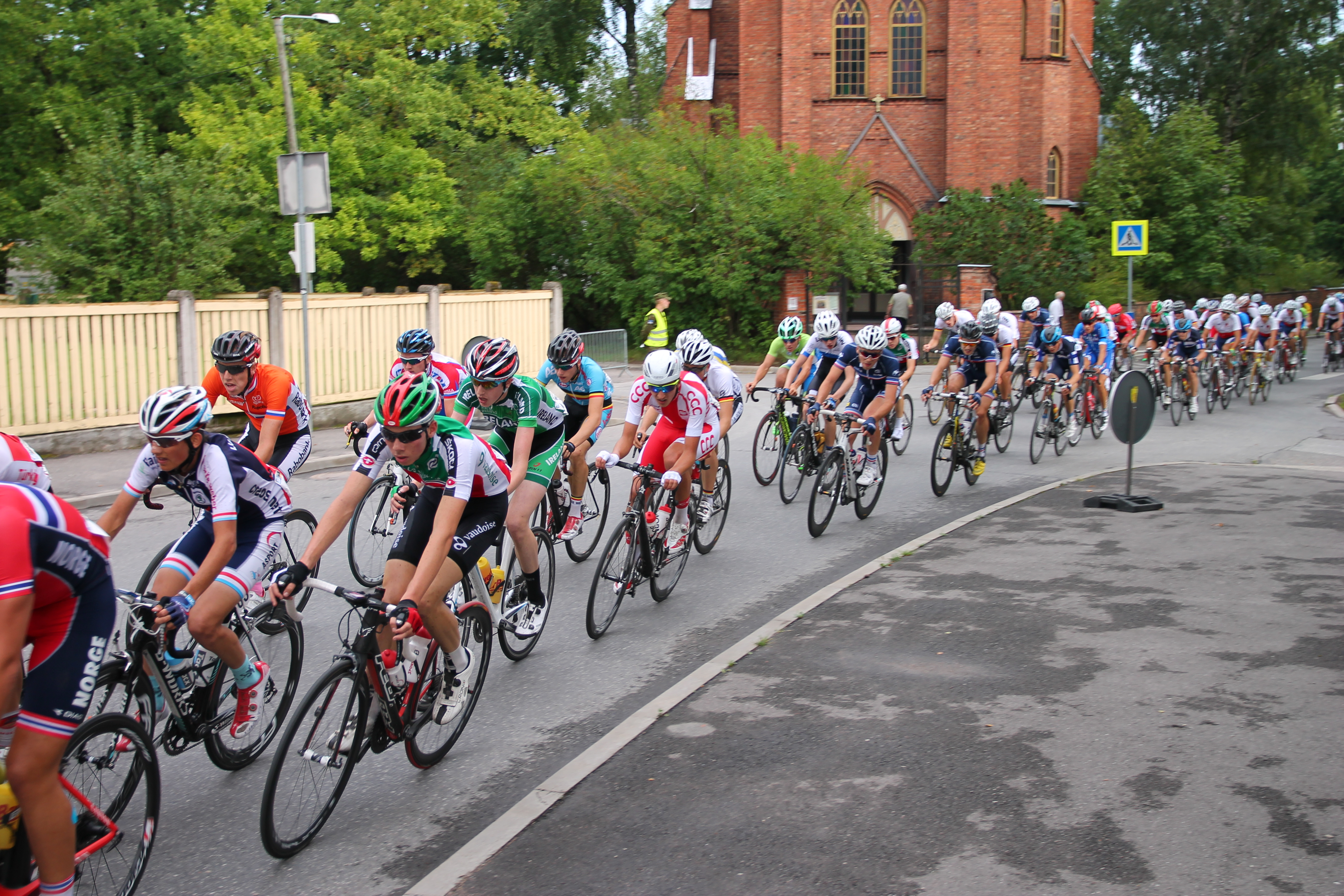
Race in Tartu

== Medal table ==
* Host nation

Rank	Nation	Gold	Silver	Bronze	Total
1	Poland (POL)	3	0	0	3
2	Italy (ITA)	1	2	1	4
2	Russia (RUS)	1	2	1	4
4	Germany (GER)	1	0	3	4
4	Netherlands (NED)	1	0	3	4
6	Slovakia (SVK)	1	0	0	1
7	Ukraine (UKR)	0	2	0	2
8	Belgium (BEL)	0	1	0	1
8	Norway (NOR)	0	1	0	1
Totals (9 entries)		8	8	8	24

== Schedule ==
=== Individual time trial ===
Thursday 6 August 2015

- 12:30 Women under-23, 18.4 km
- 15:00 Women Juniors, 14.4 km

Friday 7 August 2015

- 11:00 Men under-23, 31.5 km
- 15:00 Men Juniors, 18.4 km

=== Road race ===
Saturday 8 August 2015

- 09:30 Women Juniors, 74.4 km
- 15:00 Women under-23, 124 km

Sunday 9 August 2015

- 10:00 Men Juniors, 124 km
- 14:00 Men under-23, 161.2 km

== Events summary ==
Event	Gold		Silver		Bronze	
Men's Under-23 Events
Road race	Erik Baška; Slovakia	3h36'49"	Mamyr Stash; Russia	s.t.	Davide Martinelli; Italy	s.t.
Time trial	Steven Lammertink; Netherlands	38'32"	Marlen Zmorka; Ukraine	+4"	Maximilian Schachmann; Germany	+16"
Women's Under-23 Events
Road race	Katarzyna Niewiadoma; Poland	3h16'15"	Ilaria Sanguineti; Italy	s.t.	Thalita de Jong; Netherlands	s.t.
Time trial	Mieke Kröger; Germany	24' 57"	Olga Shekel; Ukraine	+ 8"	Corinna Lechner; Germany	+ 19"
Men's Junior Events
Road race	Alan Banaszek; Poland	2h50'19"	Stan Dewulf; Belgium	s.t.	Dennis van der Horst; Netherlands	s.t.
Time trial	Nikolai Ilechev; Russia	23'02"	Tobias Foss; Norway	+2"	Max Singer; Germany	+8"
Women's Junior Events
Road race	Nadia Quagliotto; Italy	1h54'26"	Rachele Barbieri; Italy	s.t.	Karina Kasenova; Russia	s.t.
Time trial	Agnieszka Skalniak; Poland	19'33"	Kseniia Tsymbalyuk; Russia	+13"	Yara Kastelijn; Netherlands	+29
