= Dominique Cornu =

Belgian cyclist

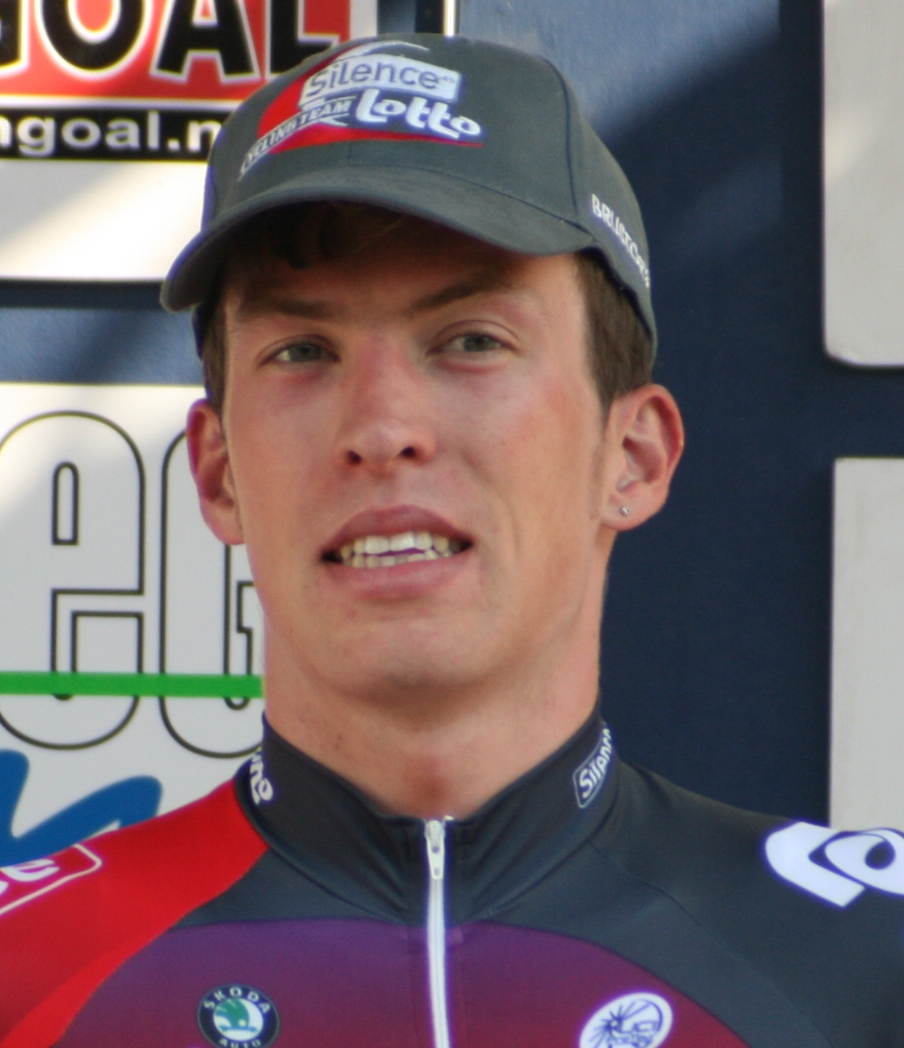

Personal information
- Full name: Dominique Cornu
- Born: 10 October 1985 (age 41) Beveren, Belgium
- Height: 1.96 m (6 ft 5 in)
- Weight: 77 kg (170 lb)

Cycling career
- Sport: Cycling
- Current team: Retired
- Disciplines: Road; Track
- Role: Rider
- Rider type: Time triallist

Professional teams
- 2005–2006: Bodysol–Win for Life–Jong Vlaanderen
- 2007–2008: Predictor–Lotto
- 2009: Quick-Step
- 2010: Skil–Shimano
- 2011–2013: Topsport Vlaanderen–Mercator
- 2014: Sunweb–Napoleon Games
- 2015: Verandas Willems

Dominique Cornu (born 10 October 1985) is a Belgian retired road and track cyclist from Flanders, who competed professionally between 2005 and 2015. He specialised in the time trial discipline.

== Career ==
Cornu was born in Beveren.

At the 2006 World Cycling Championship he was crowned Under-23 Time Trial World Champion. He had previously won the Junior Belgian Time Trial Championship in 2003 and 2004, and in 2005 he became the Belgian Under-23 time trial Champion. Cornu is also an accomplished track cyclist, winning the Individual Pursuit at the 2006 Belgian Track Cycling Championships. In addition to Cornu's time trialing skills he is also a promising cobblestone rider, having won the Under-23 edition of the prestigious Omloop "Het Volk" cycling classic in 2006.

Cornu left Topsport Vlaanderen–Baloise at the end of the 2013 season, and joined Sunweb–Napoleon Games for the 2014 season.

== Major results ==
2003
1st Time trial, National Junior Road Championships
2004
1st Time trial, National Junior Road Championships
1st Grand Prix des Nations Under–23
1st Stage 3 Ronde van Vlaams-Brabant
2005
1st Time trial, National Under-23 Road Championships
1st Overall Tour de Berlin
1st Stage 2 Tweedaagse van de Gaverstreek
1st Stage 3 Ronde van Vlaams-Brabant
2nd Time trial, UEC European Under-23 Road Championships
2006
1st Time trial, UCI Under-23 Road World Championships
1st Time trial, National Under-23 Road Championships
National Track Championships

1st Individual pursuit
2nd Kilo
3rd Points race

1st Omloop Het Nieuwsblad U23
1st Prologue Ronde van Antwerpen
3rd Time trial, UEC European Under-23 Road Championships
2008
1st Stage 4 Giro del Capo
2010
2nd Overall Tour of Belgium

1st Young rider classification
1st Stage 4 (ITT)

4th Time trial, National Road Championships
2011
7th Overall Eneco Tour
