= Jure Zrimšek =

Slovenian cyclist

Personal information
- Born: 20 January 1982 (age 44)

Cycling career
- Sport: Cycling
- Discipline: Road
- Role: Rider

Professional teams
- 2001–2002: KRKA–Telekom Slovenije
- 2005–2006: Acqua & Sapone–Adria Mobil
- 2007–2009: Adria Mobil
- 2010–2012: Sava

Jure Zrimšek (born 20 January 1982) is a Slovenian cyclist.

== Major results ==
2002
1st European U23 Points Race Championships
1st Stage 2 Olympia's Tour
3rd European U23 Time Trial Championships
2003
1st Stage 1 Tour of Slovenia
2nd European U23 Time Trial Championships
3rd Ruota d'Oro
2004
1st Overall Jadranska Magistrala

1st Stage 1

2nd Trofeo Banca Popolare di Vicenza
2005
3rd Grand Prix Rudy Dhaenens
2007
1st Prologue Tour of Croatia
2008
3rd National Time Trial Championships
2010
1st Banja Luka–Belgrade I
2011
1st Grand Prix Šenčur
3rd Poreč Trophy
