= 1997 European Road Championships =

- Venue: Villach, Austria
- Date: September 1997
- Events: 4

The 1997 European Road Championships were held in Villach, Austria, in September 1997 and regulated by the European Cycling Union. The event consisted of a road race and time trial for under-23 women and under-23 men.

== Events summary ==
Event	Gold	Silver	Bronze
Men's Under-23 Events
Road race	(Italy) Salvatore Commesso	(Switzerland) Sven Montgomery	(Austria) Gerrit Glomser
Time trial	(France) Guillaume Auger	(Italy) Fabio Malberti	(Italy) Maurizio Caravaggio
Women's Under-23 Events
Road race	(France) Élisabeth Chevanne Brunel	(Ukraine) Tatiana Stiajkina	(Spain) Izaskun Bengoa
Time trial	(Lithuania) Diana Žiliūtė	(Spain) Izaskun Bengoa	(Sweden) Jenny Algelid

== Medal table ==
Rank	Nation	Gold	Silver	Bronze	Total
1	France (FRA)	2	0	0	2
2	Italy (ITA)	1	1	1	3
3	Lithuania (LTU)	1	0	0	1
4	Spain (ESP)	0	1	1	2
5	Switzerland (SUI)	0	1	0	1
5	Ukraine (UKR)	0	1	0	1
7	Austria (AUT)	0	0	1	1
7	Sweden (SWE)	0	0	1	1
Totals (8 entries)		4	4	4	12
