= Gessica Turato =

Italian cyclist

Personal information
- Born: 30 May 1984 (age 42) Cittadella, Italy

Cycling career
- Sport: Cycling
- Disciplines: Road cycling, Track cycling

Professional teams
- 2004–2005: Safi-Pasta Zara-Manhattan
- 2006: USC Chirio Forno d'Asolo

Gessica Turato (born 30 July 1984) is a track and road cyclist from Italy. As a junior, she won the individual pursuit at the 2001 UEC European Track Championships. She won the under-23 road race at the 2005 European Road Championships and represented her nation later that year at the 2005 UCI Road World Championships.
