= 2011 European Road Championships =

Road race event in Italy

- Venue: Offida, Italy
- Date(s): 14–17 July 2011
- Events: 8

The 2011 European Road Championships were held in Offida, Italy, from 14 to 17 July 2011. The event consisted of a road race and a time trial for men and women under 23, as well as for juniors. The championships were regulated by the European Cycling Union.

== Schedule ==
=== Time trial ===
Thursday 14 July

- 11:00 Women under-23, 25 km
- 14:00 Men juniors, 25 km

Friday 15 July

- 11:00 Women juniors, 15.1 km
- 14:00 Men under-23, 25 km

=== Road race ===
Saturday 16 July

- 09:00 Women under-23, 124.2 km
- 14:00 Men juniors, 124.2 km

Sunday 17 July

- 09:00 Women juniors, 69 km
- 13:00 Men under-23, 179.4 km

== Results ==
Event	Gold		Silver		Bronze	
Men's Under-23 Events
Road race	Julian Kern; Germany	4 h 43 min 08 s	Siarhei Novikau; Belarus	s.t	Kanstantsin Klimiankou; Belarus	s.t
Time trial	Yoann Paillot; France	33 min 29 s	Bob Jungels; Luxembourg	+ 9 s	Vegard Stake Laengen; Norway	+ 11 s
Women's Under-23 Events
Road race	Larisa Pankova; Russia	3 h 29 min 38 s	Alena Amialiusik; Belarus	s.t	Lucinda Brand; Netherlands	s.t
Time trial	Mélodie Lesueur; France	39 min 15 s	Larisa Pankova; Russia	+ 38 s	Katazina Sosna; Lithuania	+ 50 s
Men's Junior Events
Road race	Pierre-Henri Lecuisinier; France	3 h 07 min 16 s	Olivier Le Gac; France	+ 21 s	Loïc Vliegen; Belgium	+ 24 s
Time trial	Alberto Bettiol; Italy	35 min 24 s	Alexis Gougeard; France	+ 2 s	Alexey Rydakin; Russia	+ 9 s
Women's Junior Events
Road race	Rossella Ratto; Italy	2 h 11 min 13 s	Jessy Druyts; Belgium	+ 4 min 31 s	Chiara Vannucci; Italy	+ 4 min 33 s
Time trial	Rossella Ratto; Italy	21 min 45 s	Mathilde Favre; France	+ 11 s	Svetlana Kashirina; Russia	+ 15 s

== Medale table ==
Rank	Nation	Gold	Silver	Bronze	Total
1	France (FRA)	3	3	0	6
2	Italy (ITA)	3	0	1	4
3	Russia (RUS)	1	1	2	4
4	Germany (GER)	1	0	0	1
5	Belarus (BLR)	0	2	1	3
6	Belgium (BEL)	0	1	1	2
7	Luxembourg (LUX)	0	1	0	1
8	Lithuania (LTU)	0	0	1	1
8	Netherlands (NED)	0	0	1	1
8	Norway (NOR)	0	0	1	1
Totals (10 entries)		8	8	8	24
