= Olivier Le Gac =

French cyclist

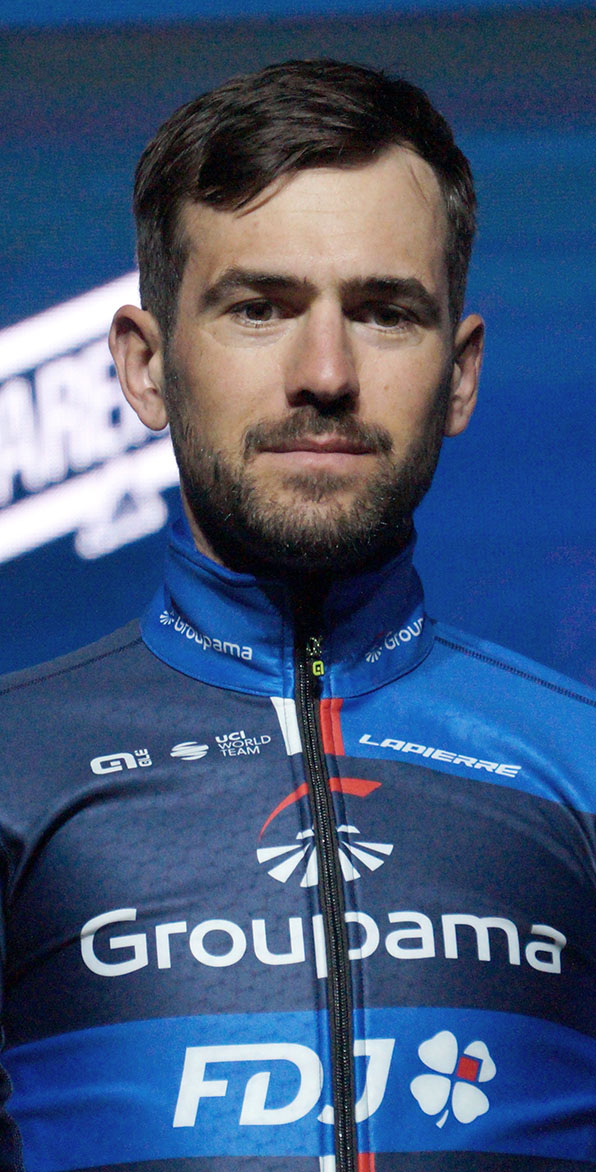
- Le Gac in 2023

Personal information
- Full name: Olivier Le Gac
- Born: 27 August 1993 (age 33) Brest, France
- Height: 1.80 m (5 ft 11 in)
- Weight: 70 kg (154 lb; 11 st 0 lb)

Cycling career
- Sport: Cycling
- Current team: Groupama–FDJ United
- Discipline: Road
- Role: Rider

Amateur teams
- 2010–2011: VS Plabennec
- 2012–2014: BIC 2000
- 2013: FDJ.fr (stagiaire)

Professional team
- 2014–: FDJ.fr

Olivier Le Gac (born 27 August 1993) is a French cyclist, who currently rides for UCI WorldTeam Groupama–FDJ United.

== Major results ==
2010
1st Road race, UCI Junior Road World Championships
1st Overall GP Général Patton

1st Stage 1

3rd Overall Le Trophée Centre Morbihan
2011
2nd Road race, UEC European Junior Road Championships
2nd Overall Le Trophée Centre Morbihan

1st Stage 2 (ITT)

3rd Time trial, National Junior Road Championships
2012
1st Stage 1 Tour Nivernais Morvan
3rd La Gainsbarre
9th Overall Coupe des nations Ville Saguenay
2013
1st Tour du Pays du Roumois
2nd Paris–Connerré
3rd Paris–Tours Espoirs
6th Road race, UEC European Under-23 Road Championships
2014
1st Tour de la Creuse
2nd Tour de Vendée
2017
8th Classic Loire Atlantique
2018 (1 pro win)
6th Tro-Bro Léon
7th Bretagne Classic
10th Overall Four Days of Dunkirk

1st Stage 6

2021
4th Tro-Bro Léon
2023
5th Paris–Tours

=== Grand Tour general classification results timeline ===
| Grand Tour | 2015 | 2016 | 2017 | 2018 | 2019 | 2020 | 2021 | 2022 | 2023 | 2024 |
|---|---|---|---|---|---|---|---|---|---|---|
| Giro d'Italia | — | 133 | — | — | 112 | — | — | — | — | 133 |
| Tour de France | — | — | 158 | 127 | — | — | — | 88 | 131 | |
| Vuelta a España | 120 | — | — | — | — | 68 | 76 | — | — | |

Legend
| — | Did not compete |
| DNF | Did not finish |
