= Graziano Gasparre =

Italian cyclist

Personal information
- Born: 27 June 1978 (age 48) Codogno, Italy

Cycling career
- Sport: Cycling
- Current team: Retired
- Discipline: Road
- Role: Rider

Amateur team
- 2000: Team Polti (stagiaire)

Professional teams
- 2001–2002: Mapei–Quick-Step
- 2003–2004: De Nardi
- 2006–2009: Amore & Vita–McDonald's

Graziano Gasparre (born 27 June 1978) is an Italian former cyclist.

== Career ==
Gasparre participated in two editions of the Giro d'Italia and booked multiple victories in his career, including the European Road Race Championship, the Giro delle Regioni and the Ronde de l'Isard. In addition to these, he also won stages of the Tour de l'Avenir, the Circuit de Lorraine, the Settimana Internazionale di Coppi e Bartali and the Settimana Ciclistica Lombarda.

=== Doping ===
He admitted using doping (Amphetamine, Cocaine, EPO, hGH, Testosterone) during his career on November 26, 2012. Gasparre has provided information to anti-doping investigators in Florence. He underwent surgery to remove a tumour in Reggio Emilia in November 2012. He believed the tumour was a consequence of doping during his racing career.

== Major results ==
1999
3rd Triptyque Ardennais
2000
1st U23 European Road Race Championships
1st Overall Giro delle Regioni

1st Stage 3

1st Overall Ronde de l'Isard

1st Stages 2 & 3

2nd Gran Premio della Liberazione
2001
1st Stage 9 Tour de l'Avenir
2002
5th GP Herning
9th Overall Circuit de Lorraine

1st Stage 2

2003
4th Overall Giro del Trentino
10th Giro della Provincia di Reggio Calabria
2004
1st Stage 1a Settimana Internazionale di Coppi e Bartali
2006
3rd Overall Settimana Ciclistica Lombarda

1st Stage 4
