= Sven Montgomery =

Swiss cyclist

Personal information
- Born: 10 May 1976 (age 50) Detmold, West Germany

Cycling career
- Sport: Cycling
- Discipline: Road
- Role: Rider
- Rider type: Climber

Professional teams
- 1998–1999: Post Swiss Team
- 2000–2001: Française des Jeux
- 2002–2003: Fassa Bortolo
- 2004–2006: Gerolsteiner

Sven Montgomery (born 10 May 1976) is a Swiss former professional cyclist.

== Career ==
Early on, Montgomery was considered to be a very promising rider. He turned professional in 1998 with the Post Swiss Team, with his career lasting until 2006. Throughout his career, he rode for several prestigious professional teams including Française des Jeux, Fassa Bortolo and Gerolsteiner. He was considered a climber. After finishing third in the 2000 Tour de l'Avenir, he won the fifth stage of the Grand Prix du Midi libre and the mountains classification of the Critérium du Dauphiné Libéré in 2001. He competed in four editions of the Tour de France, but failed to finish any.

Montgomery's career was overshadowed by bad luck. In 2001, during his best season, he was badly injured in a crash at the Tour de France, where he suffered several serious injuries to the face and head, making him almost blind. This heavy fall prevented him from riding for almost the entire following year. During the 2004 Giro d'Italia, he suffered multiple injuries, including a tear of his scapula and a broken collarbone. In addition, he fell badly ill in 2002.

Because of his numerous setbacks, Montgomery retired at the age of 30 in 2006. He then became a directeur sportif for the Bigla Cycling Team, a professional women's team.

== Career achievements ==
=== Major results ===
1997
2nd Road race, European Under-23 Road Championships
1999
2nd Overall UNIQA Classic
3rd Wartenberg Rundfahrt
5th Josef Voegeli Memorial
6th Overall Tour de Suisse
8th Overall Regio-Tour
2000
3rd Overall Tour de l'Avenir
4th Overall Tour de Suisse
7th GP Industria & Commercio di Prato
7th Josef Voegeli Memorial
9th Giro dell'Emilia
10th Overall Tour de Picardie
2001
1st Stage 5 GP du Midi-Libre
3rd Rominger Classic
4th Overall Critérium du Dauphiné Libéré

1st Mountains classification

6th Overall Tour de Romandie
2003
6th Luk-Cup Bühl
8th Overall Tour de Suisse
2004
1st Mountains classification, Tour de Romandie

=== Grand Tour general classification results timeline ===
Grand Tour	2000	2001	2002	2003	2004	2005	2006
Giro d'Italia	—	—	—	—	DNF	59	—
Tour de France	DNF	DNF	—	DNF	DNF	—	—
Vuelta a España	—	—	—	DNF	—	88	DNF

Legend
DSQ	Disqualified
DNF	Did not finish
