= 1998 European Road Championships =

- Venue: Uppsala, Sweden
- Date(s): August 1998
- Events: 4

The 1998 European Road Championships were held in Uppsala, Sweden, in August 1998. Regulated by the European Cycling Union. The event consisted of a road race and time trial for under-23 women and under-23 men.

== Events summary ==
Event	Gold	Silver	Bronze
Men's Under-23 Events
Road race	(Slovenia) Zoran Klemenčič	(Belgium) Andy Vidts	(Germany) Raphael Schweda
Time trial	(Russia) Oleg Joukov	(Italy) Marco Pinotti	(Hungary) László Bodrogi
Women's Under-23 Events
Road race	(Sweden) Susanne Ljungskog	(Lithuania) Diana Žiliūtė	(Netherlands) Mirella van Melis
Time trial	(Lithuania) Diana Žiliūtė	(Sweden) Susanne Ljungskog	(Lithuania) Rasa Mažeikytė

== Medal table ==
Rank	Nation	Gold	Silver	Bronze	Total
1	Lithuania (LTU)	1	1	1	3
2	Sweden (SWE)	1	1	0	2
3	Russia (RUS)	1	0	0	1
3	Slovenia (SLO)	1	0	0	1
5	Belgium (BEL)	0	1	0	1
5	Italy (ITA)	0	1	0	1
7	Germany (GER)	0	0	1	1
7	Hungary (HUN)	0	0	1	1
7	Netherlands (NED)	0	0	1	1
Totals (9 entries)		4	4	4	12
