= Madeleine Sandig =

German cyclist (born 1983)

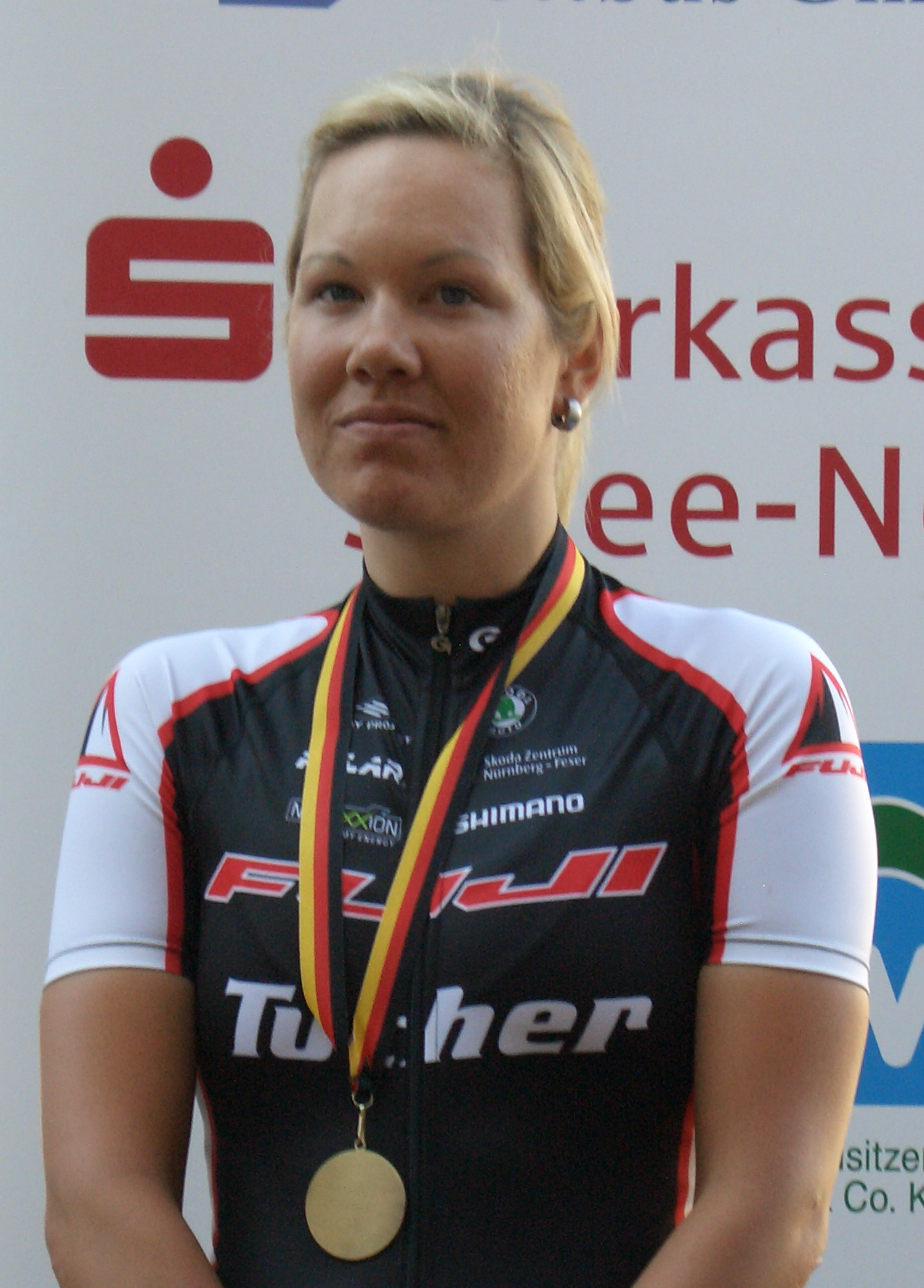
- Madeleine Sandig in 2010

Personal information
- Born: August 12, 1983 (age 43) Frankfurt am Main, West Germany

Cycling career
- Sport: Cycling
- Disciplines: Road and track
- Role: Rider

Professional teams
- 2003: Euregio Ergensis
- 2006–2007: Team Flexpoint
- 2008: Team Columbia Women
- 2009: Equipe Nürnberger Versicherung
- 2013: Noris Cycling

Madeleine Sandig (born 12 August 1983 in Frankfurt am Main, West Germany) is a German road and track racing cyclist.

Sandig won the under-23 individual time trial at the 2005 European Road Championships after finishing second in 2004.

== Palmarès ==
2004

- 2nd, individual time trial 2004 European Road Championships

2005

- 1st, individual time trial 2005 European Road Championships
- 1st, stage 4b 2005 Holland Ladies Tour
- 2nd, points race, Italian national championships (track)
- 3rd, time trial, Italian national championships

2006 (Buitenpoort–Flexpoint Team)

- 1st, stage 1 Tour de l'Aude
- 1st, points race, Italian national championships (track)
- 2nd, time trial, Italian national championships

2009

- 1st, stage 2 Tour de l'Aude
- 1st, individual pursuit, Italian national championships (track)

2010

- 3rd, individual pursuit, Italian national championships (track)
- 1st, points race, Italian national championships (track)
- 3rd, team pursuit, 2010 European Track Championships (track)

2011

- 2nd, individual pursuit, Italian national championships (track)
- 1st, team pursuit, Italian national championships (track)
- 2nd, points race, Italian national championships (track)
- 2nd, team pursuit, 2011 European Track Championships (track)

2012

- 3rd, points race, Perth International Track Cycling Grand Prix (track)
- 1st, stage 4, Czech Tour
