= Guillaume Auger =

French cyclist (born 1976)

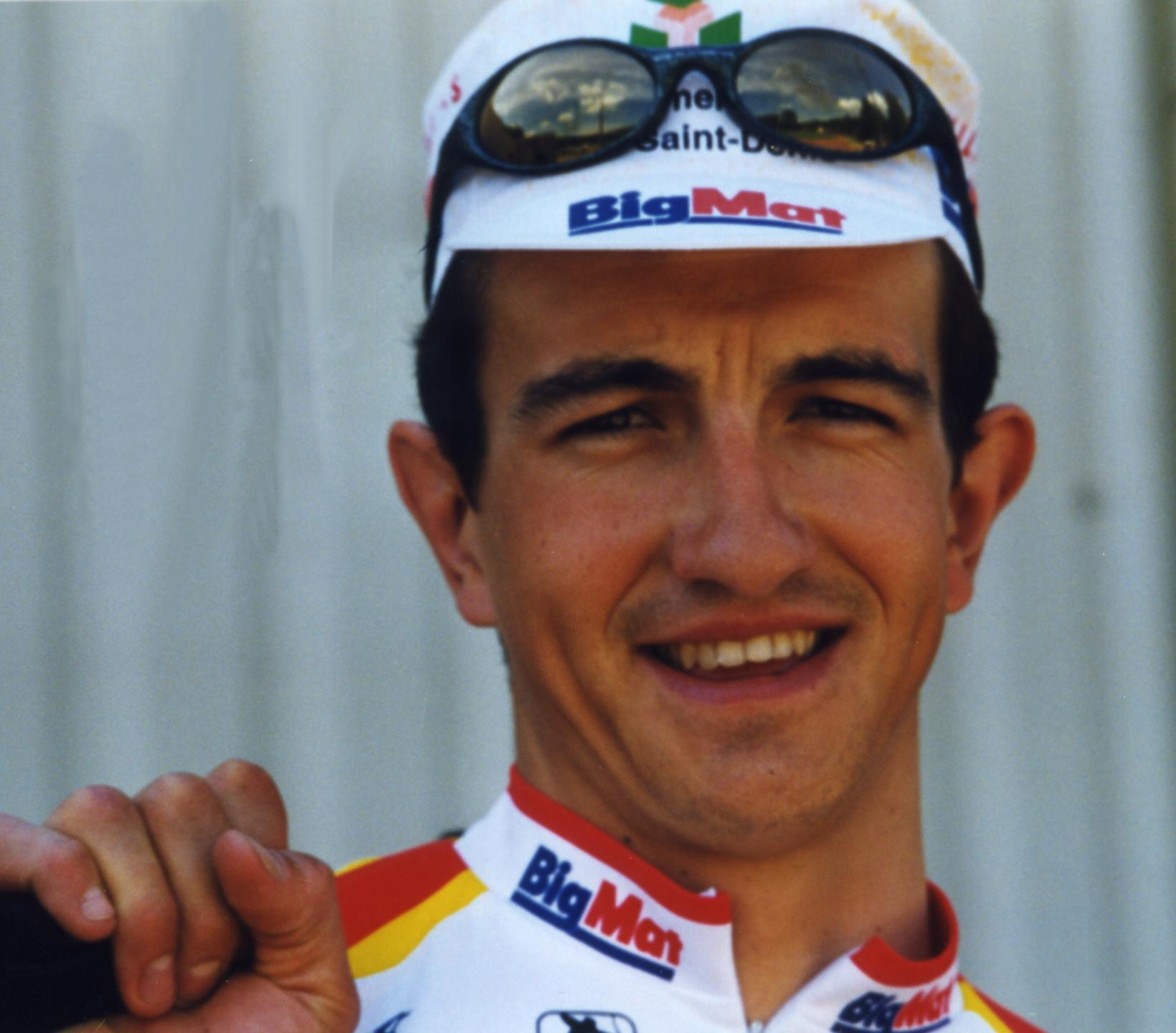

Personal information
- Born: March 21, 1976 (age 50) Joigny, France
- Height: 1.84 m (6 ft 0 in)
- Weight: 78 kg (172 lb)

Cycling career
- Sport: Cycling
- Current team: Retired
- Discipline: Road
- Role: Rider

Amateur team
- 2007–2014: VC Avranches

Professional teams
- 1998–2003: BigMat–Auber 93
- 2004–2005: R.A.G.T. Semences–MG Rover

Guillaume Auger (born 21 March 1976) is a French former professional road cyclist. He competed in the 2001 Tour de France and the 2004 Tour de France, finishing 136th overall in both editions. His sporting career began with CC Joigny.

== Major results ==
1995
2nd Chrono des Nations Espoirs
1996
3rd Paris–Tours Espoirs
1997
1st Road race, European Under-23 Road Championships
1st Chrono des Nations Espoirs
5th Road race, UCI World Under-23 Road Championship
1998
1st Stage 5 Volta ao Algarve
2nd Duo Normand (with Carlos Da Cruz)
7th Kuurne–Brussels–Kuurne
1999
1st Stage 3 Tour Méditerranéen
9th Overall Tour de Normandie
2000
1st GP Stad Vilvoorde
3rd Overall Tour de Normandie
4th Time trial, National Road Championships
2002
9th Overall Tour of Sweden
2003
1st Overall Circuit des Mines
1st Stage 2a Tour de la Somme
4th Grand Prix de la Ville de Lillers
9th Tour du Finistère
2005
4th Overall Tour de la Somme
