= Stefan Adamsson =

Swedish cyclist (born 1978)

Personal information
- Born: 3 January 1978 (age 48) Skövde, Sweden

Cycling career
- Sport: Cycling
- Discipline: Road
- Role: Rider

Professional teams
- 2000: Crescent
- 2001–2003: Team Coast–Buffalo
- 2004–2005: Barloworld
- 2006: Continental Team Milram

Stefan Adamsson (born 3 January 1978) is a Swedish cyclist.

== Major results ==
1999
1st Stage 2 Tour de Serbie
2000
1st National Road Race Championships
2nd Under–23 Time trial, European Road Championships
1st Scandinavian Race Uppsala
2nd Paris–Tours Espoirs
9th Under–23 Road race, World Road Championships
2002
1st National Road Race Championships
2004
4th Grand Prix de Fourmies
10th Ronde van Drenthe
2003
8th Overall Circuit Franco-Belge
2005
3rd National Time Trial Championships
3rd National Road Race Championships
5th Grand Prix de Denain
8th Overall GP Costa Azul
2006
2nd Overall International Cycling Classic
