= 2009 European Road Championships =

- Venue: Hooglede-Gits and Ostend, Belgium
- Date(s): 1–5 July 2009
- Events: 8

The 2009 European Road Championships were held in Hooglede-Gits and Ostend, Belgium, between 1–5 July 2009. The event consisted of a road race and a time trial for men and women under 23 and juniors. The championships were regulated by the European Cycling Union.

== Schedule ==
=== Individual time trial ===
Wednesday 1 July 2009

- Men Juniors, 28.1 km
- Women U23, 28.1 km

Thursday 2 July 2009

- Women Juniors, 12.0 km
- Men U23, 37.0 km

=== Road race ===
Saturday 4 July 2009

- Men Juniors, 135.3 km
- Women U23, 135.3 km

Sunday 5 July 2009

- Women Juniors, 63.3 km
- Men U23, 175.5 km

== Events summary ==
Event	Gold		Silver		Bronze	
Men's Under-23 Events
Road race	Kris Boeckmans; Belgium	3h 59' 07"	Jarosław Marycz; Poland	s.t.	Sacha Modolo; Italy	s.t.
Time trial	Marcel Kittel; Germany	57' 55.74"	Timofey Kritskiy; Russia	s.t.	Rasmus Christian Quaade; Denmark	+ 1"
Women's Under-23 Events
Road race	Chantal Blaak; Netherlands	3h 38' 32"	Katie Colclough; Great Britain	+ 58"	Marianne Vos; Netherlands	+ 1'03"
Time trial	Ellen van Dijk; Netherlands	36' 41"	Emilia Fahlin; Sweden	+ 20"	Marianne Vos; Netherlands	+ 24"
Men's Junior Events
Road race	Luca Wackermann; Italy	3h 33' 25"	Barry Markus; Netherlands	+ 19"	Arnaud Démare; France	s.t.
Time trial	Joseph Perrett; Great Britain	34' 58"	Bob Jungels; Luxembourg	+ 16"	Kévin Labèque; France	+ 18"
Women's Junior Events
Road race	Elena Cecchini; Italy	1h 34' 46"	Laura van der Kamp; Netherlands	+ 1"	Pauline Ferrand-Prévot; France	s.t.
Time trial	Pauline Ferrand-Prévot; France	16' 55"	Hanna Solovey; Ukraine	+ 1"	Maria Grandt Petersen; Denmark	+ 30"

== Medal table ==
Rank	Nation	Gold	Silver	Bronze	Total
1	Netherlands (NLD)	2	2	2	6
2	Italy (ITA)	2	0	1	3
3	Great Britain (GBR)	1	1	0	2
4	France (FRA)	1	0	3	4
5	Belgium (BEL)	1	0	0	1
5	Germany (GER)	1	0	0	1
7	Luxembourg (LUX)	0	1	0	1
7	Poland (POL)	0	1	0	1
7	Russia (RUS)	0	1	0	1
7	Sweden (SWE)	0	1	0	1
7	Ukraine (UKR)	0	1	0	1
12	Denmark (DEN)	0	0	2	2
Totals (12 entries)		8	8	8	24
