= 2002 European Road Championships =

2002 cycling championship

- Venue: Bergamo, Italy
- Date(s): 2–4 August 2002
- Events: 4

The 2002 European Road Championships were held in Bergamo, Italy, between 2 August and 4 August 2002. Regulated by the European Cycling Union. The event consisted of a road race and a time trial for men and women under-23.

== Schedule ==
=== Individual time trial ===
Friday 2 August 2002

- Women under-23
- Men under-23

=== Road race ===
Sunday 4 August 2002

- Women under-23
- Men under-23

== Events summary ==
Event	Gold		Silver		Bronze	
Men's Under-23 Events
Road race	Michael Albasini; Switzerland	4 h 01 min 46s	Mikhail Timochine; Russia	s.t.	Matthieu Sprick; France	s.t.
Time trial	Jonas Olsson; Sweden	39 min 10s	Alexander Bespalov; Russia	+ 14s	Jure Zrimšek; Slovenia	+ 25s
Women's Under-23 Events
Road race	Trixi Worrack; Germany	2 h 51 min 20s	Evy Van Damme; Belgium	s.t.	Virginie Moinard; France	s.t.
Time trial	Olga Zabelinskaïa; Russia	32 min 22s	Vera Carrara; Italy	+ 48s	Vera Koedooder; Netherlands	+ 1'04s

== Medal table ==
Rank	Nation	Gold	Silver	Bronze	Total
1	Russia (RUS)	1	2	0	3
2	Germany (GER)	1	0	0	1
2	Sweden (SWE)	1	0	0	1
2	Switzerland (SUI)	1	0	0	1
5	Belgium (BEL)	0	1	0	1
5	Italy (ITA)	0	1	0	1
7	France (FRA)	0	0	2	2
8	Netherlands (NLD)	0	0	1	1
8	Slovenia (SLO)	0	0	1	1
Totals (9 entries)		4	4	4	12
