= Virginie Moinard =

French cyclist

Personal information
- Born: 7 August 1981 (age 45) Thiais, France

Cycling career
- Sport: Cycling
- Disciplines: Road and track
- Role: Rider

Professional team
- 2004: Bik-Gios

Virginie Moinard (born 7 August 1981 in Thiais, France) is a French road and track racing cyclist.

Moinard won the under-23 individual time trial at the 2003 European Road Championships, and finished third in the under-23 road race in 2002. At the track she won a bronze medal in the scratch at the 2004–05 UCI Track Cycling World Cup Classics in Manchester.
