= 2008 European Road Championships =

- Venue: Stresa, Pettenasco, Arona and Verbania, Italy
- Date(s): 3–6 July 2008
- Events: 8

The 2008 European Road Championships were held in Stresa, Pettenasco, Arona and Verbania, in the province of Novare and Verbano-Cusio-Ossola, Italy, between 3 July and 6 July 2008. Regulated by the European Cycling Union. The event consisted of a road race and a time trial for men and women under 23 and juniors.

== Schedule ==
=== Individual time trial ===
Thursday 3 July 2008

- 09:00 - Women U23, 25.3 km
- 11:30 - Men U23, 25.3 km

Friday 4 July 2008

- 09:30 - Women Juniors, 16.5 km
- 11:00 - Men Juniors, 26.5 km

=== Road race ===
Saturday 5 July 2008

- 09:00 - Women U23, 129.6 km
- 11:30 - Men U23, 151,2 km

Sunday 6 July 2008

- 09:00 - Women Juniors, 86.4 km
- 11:00 - Men Juniors, 129.6 km

== Events summary ==
Event	Gold		Silver		Bronze	
Men's Under-23 Events
Road race	Cyril Gautier; France	3h 39' 49"	Paul Voss; Germany	+ 24"	Timofey Kritskiy; Russia	s.t.
Time trial	Adriano Malori; Italy	27' 56"	Timofey Kritskiy; Russia	+ 7"	Artem Ovechkin; Russia	+ 21"
Women's Under-23 Events
Road race	Rasa Leleivytė; Lithuania	3h 50' 56"	Lesya Kalytovska; Ukraine	s.t.	Marta Bastianelli; Italy	s.t.
Time trial	Ellen van Dijk; Netherlands	32' 33"	Svitlana Halyuk; Ukraine	+ 5"	Lesya Kalytovska; Ukraine	+ 8"
Men's Junior Events
Road race	Johan Le Bon; France	3h 13' 57"	Luke Rowe; Great Britain	s.t.	Piotr Gawronski; Poland	s.t.
Time trial	Michał Kwiatkowski; Poland	20' 09"	Vegard Breen; Norway	+ 3"	Johan Le Bon; France	+ 14"
Women's Junior Events
Road race	Valentina Scandolara; Italy	2h 22' 06"	Valeriya Kononenko; Ukraine	s.t.	Jessie Daams; Belgium	s.t.
Time trial	Valeriya Kononenko; Ukraine	23' 02"	Jacqueline Hahn; Austria	+ 35"	Maria Mishina; Russia	+ 45"

== Medal table ==
Rank	Nation	Gold	Silver	Bronze	Total
1	France (FRA)	2	0	1	3
1	Italy (ITA)	2	0	1	3
3	Ukraine (UKR)	1	3	1	5
4	Poland (POL)	1	0	1	2
5	Lithuania (LTU)	1	0	0	1
5	Netherlands (NLD)	1	0	0	1
7	Russia (RUS)	0	1	3	4
8	Austria (AUT)	0	1	0	1
8	Germany (GER)	0	1	0	1
8	Great Britain (GBR)	0	1	0	1
8	Norway (NOR)	0	1	0	1
12	Belgium (BEL)	0	0	1	1
Totals (12 entries)		8	8	8	24
