= Kévin Labèque =

French cyclist

Kevin Labeque
Personal information
- Born: 7 December 1991 (age 34)

Cycling career
- Sport: Cycling
- Discipline: Track cycling
- Role: Rider
- Rider type: individual pursuit

Kevin Labeque (born 7 December 1991) is a French male track cyclist. He competed in the individual pursuit event at the 2012 UCI Track Cycling World Championships.
