= Dmytro Grabovskyy =

Ukrainian cyclist

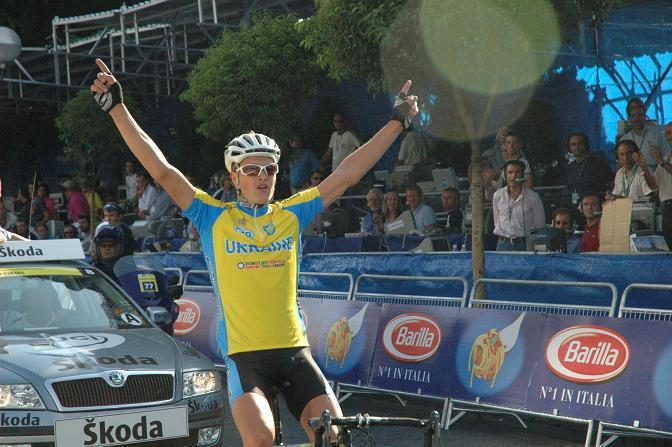
- Grabovskyy in 2005

Personal information
- Full name: Dmytro Ihorevych Grabovskyy
- Born: 30 September 1985 Simferopol, Crimean Oblast, Ukrainian SSR, Soviet Union
- Died: 23 January 2017 (aged 31)
- Height: 1.85 m (6 ft 1 in)
- Weight: 69 kg (152 lb)

Cycling career
- Sport: Cycling
- Discipline: Road
- Role: Rider

Amateur teams
- 2005–2006: Team Finauto–Quickstep (under-23 satellite team)
- 2006: Quick-Step–Innergetic (stagiaire)

Professional teams
- 2007–2008: Quick-Step–Innergetic
- 2009–2010: ISD
- 2011: ISD–Lampre
- 2015: Jilun Shakeland Cycling Team

Major wins
- Mountains Classification, Tirreno–Adriatico (2009)

Dmytro Ihorevych Grabovskyy (Ukrainian: Дмитро Ігоревич Грабовський, Hebrew: דימיטרי גרבובסקי; 30 September 1985 – 23 January 2017) was a Ukrainian professional road bicycle racer, who last competed for UCI Continental team Jilun Shakeland Cycling Team before his death in 2017.

== Career ==
He was second in the time trial for juniors at the 2005 World Championship Cycling in Madrid and he won the road race. He signed his first professional contract with Quick-Step–Innergetic. After two years he joined ISD in 2009: after two years there he joined ISD-Lampre for 2011, his final year as a professional. He competed in one Grand Tour during his career, the 2009 Giro d'Italia. In a 2010 interview with Gazetta dello Sport he admitted that he had suffered from problems with alcoholism during his period with Quick-Step, to the point where he came close to death from alcohol poisoning on two occasions.

He took up Israeli citizenship in 2015. Grabovskyy died from a heart attack on 23 January 2017.

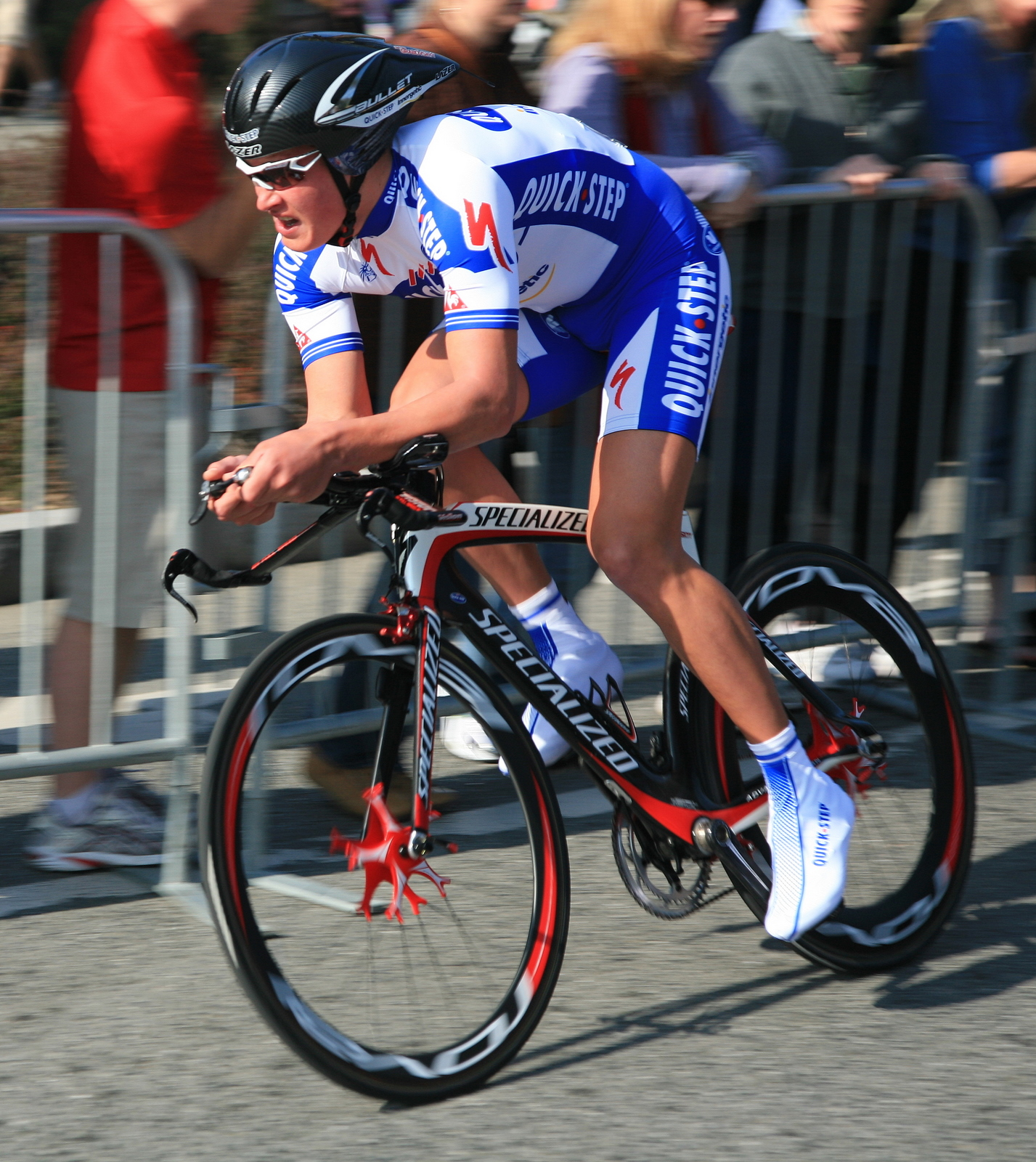
Dmytro Grabovskyy in the Prologue of the 2008 Tour of California

== Major results ==
2003
2nd Time trial, UCI Junior Road World Championships
2005
UCI Under-23 Road World Championships

1st Road race
2nd Time trial

1st Time trial, UEC European Under-23 Road Championships
1st Stage 5 Five Rings of Moscow
2006
1st Time trial, UEC European Under-23 Road Championships
1st Overall Giro delle Regioni

1st Stages 2, 3 & 5b

2nd Overall Girobio

1st Stage 2

2nd Time trial, National Under-23 Road Championships
2007
3rd Time trial, National Road Championships
2008
5th Firenze–Pistoia
2009
2nd Time trial, National Road Championships
2010
1st Mountains classification, Tirreno–Adriatico
2015
3rd Overall Israman Negev Israel (1st Israeli)
