= 2006 European Road Championships =

Cycling championship held in Netherlands

- Venue: Valkenburg and Heerlen, Netherlands
- Date: 13–16 July 2006
- Events: 8

The 2006 European Road Championships were held in Valkenburg and Heerlen, Netherlands, between 13 July and 16 July 2006. Regulated by the European Cycling Union. The event consisted of a road race and a time trial for men and women under 23 and juniors.

== Schedule ==
=== Individual time trial ===
Thursday 13 July 2006

- Women U23, 24.0 km
- Men Juniors, 24.0 km

Friday 14 July 2006

- Men U23, 34.0 km
- Women Juniors, 16.1 km

=== Road race ===
Saturday 15 July 2006

- Women U23, 110.0 km
- Men Juniors, 144.0 km

Sunday 16 July 2006

- Women Juniors, 77.7 km
- Men U23, 177.6 km

== Events summary ==
Event	Gold		Silver		Bronze	
Men's Under-23 Events
Road race	Benoit Sinner; France	4 h 34 min 08s	Rene Mandri; Estonia	s.t.	Francesco Gavazzi; Italy	s.t.
Time trial	Dmytro Grabovskyy; Ukraine	38 min 36s	Jérôme Coppel; France	+ 46s	Dominique Cornu; Belgium	+ 52s
Women's Under-23 Events
Road race	Marianne Vos; Netherlands	3 h 07 min 06s	Tatiana Guderzo; Italy	s.t.	Monica Holler; Sweden	+ 58s
Time trial	Linda Villumsen; Denmark	36 min 32s	Tatiana Guderzo; Italy	+ 27s	Bianca Knoepfle; Germany	+ 1 min 13s
Men's Junior Events
Road race	Etienne Pieret; France	3 h 20 min 14s	Thomas Bertolini; Italy	s.t.	Ronan van Zandbeek; Netherlands	s.t.
Time trial	Dmitry Sokolov; Russia	33 min 28s	Tony Gallopin; France	+ 16s	Adriano Malori; Italy	+ 33s
Women's Junior Events
Road race	Mie Bekker Lacota; Denmark	2 h 12 min 56s	Elise Van Hage; Netherlands	+ 2s	Julie Krasniak; France	+ 9s
Time trial	Mie Bekker Lacota; Denmark	23 min 38s	Trine Schmidt Hansen; Denmark	+ 28s	Alexandra Bourchenkova; Russia	+ 28s

== Medal table ==
Rank	Nation	Gold	Silver	Bronze	Total
1	Denmark (DNK)	3	1	0	4
2	France (FRA)	2	2	1	5
3	Netherlands (NLD)	1	1	1	3
4	Russia (RUS)	1	0	1	2
5	Ukraine (UKR)	1	0	0	1
6	Italy (ITA)	0	3	2	5
7	Estonia (EST)	0	1	0	1
8	Belgium (BEL)	0	0	1	1
8	Germany (GER)	0	0	1	1
8	Sweden (SWE)	0	0	1	1
Totals (10 entries)		8	8	8	24
