= 2010 European Road Championships =

- Venue: Ankara, Turkey
- Date(s): 15–18 July 2010
- Events: 8

The 2010 European Road Championships were held in Ankara, Turkey, between 15 and 18 July 2010. The event consisted of a road race and a time trial for men and women under 23 and juniors. The championships were regulated by the European Cycling Union.

== Schedule ==
=== Time trial ===
Thursday 15 July

- 12:00 Women under-23, 25.9 km
- 15:00 Men juniors, 25.9 km

Friday 16 July

- 12:00 Women juniors, 13.5 km
- 15:00 Men under-23, 25.9 km

=== Road Race ===
Saturday 17 July

- 10:00 Men juniors, 148.5 km
- 14:30 Women under-23, 121.5 km

Sunday 18 July

- 10:00 Women juniors, 84.0 km
- 14:00 Men under-23, 189.0 km

== Results ==
Event	Gold		Silver		Bronze	
Men's Under-23
Road race	Piotr Gawroński; Poland	4 h 03 min 08 s	Nelson Oliveira; Portugal	+ 1 s	Arnaud Démare; France	+ 3 s
Time trial	Alex Dowsett; United Kingdom	31 min 08 s	Geoffrey Soupe; France	+ 14 s	Nelson Oliveira; Portugal	+ 18 s
Women's Under-23
Road race	Noortje Tabak; Netherlands	3 h 08 min 21 s	Lesya Kalytovska; Ukraine	+ 00 s	Aušrinė Trebaitė; Lithuania	+ 01 s
Time trial	Alexandra Burchenkova; Russia	34 min 37 s	Emilia Fahlin; Sweden	+ 11 s	Kataržina Sosna; Lithuania	+ 52 s
Men's Junior
Road race	Blaž Bogataj; Slovenia	3 h 10 min 59 s	Bryan Coquard; France	s.t.	Rafael Reis; Portugal	s.t.
Time trial	Kirill Yatsevich; Russia	32 min 08 s	Émilien Viennet; France	+ 4 s	Marlen Zmorka; Ukraine	+ 35 s
Women's Junior
Road race	Anna Trevisi; Italy	2 h 05 min 31 s	Pauline Ferrand-Prévot; France	+ 0 s	Rossella Ratto; Italy	+ 2 s
Time trial	Hanna Solovey; Ukraine	17 min 42 s	Pauline Ferrand-Prévot; France	+ 36 s	Alexia Muffat; France	+ 1 min 15 s

== Medal table ==
Rank	Nation	Gold	Silver	Bronze	Total
1	RUS	2	0	0	2
2	UKR	1	1	1	3
3	ITA	1	0	1	2
4	GBR	1	0	0	1
4	NED	1	0	0	1
4	POL	1	0	0	1
4	SLO	1	0	0	1
8	FRA	0	5	2	7
9	POR	0	1	2	3
10	SWE	0	1	0	1
11	LTU	0	0	2	2
Totals (11 entries)		8	8	8	24
