= Nicolas Fritsch =

French cyclist

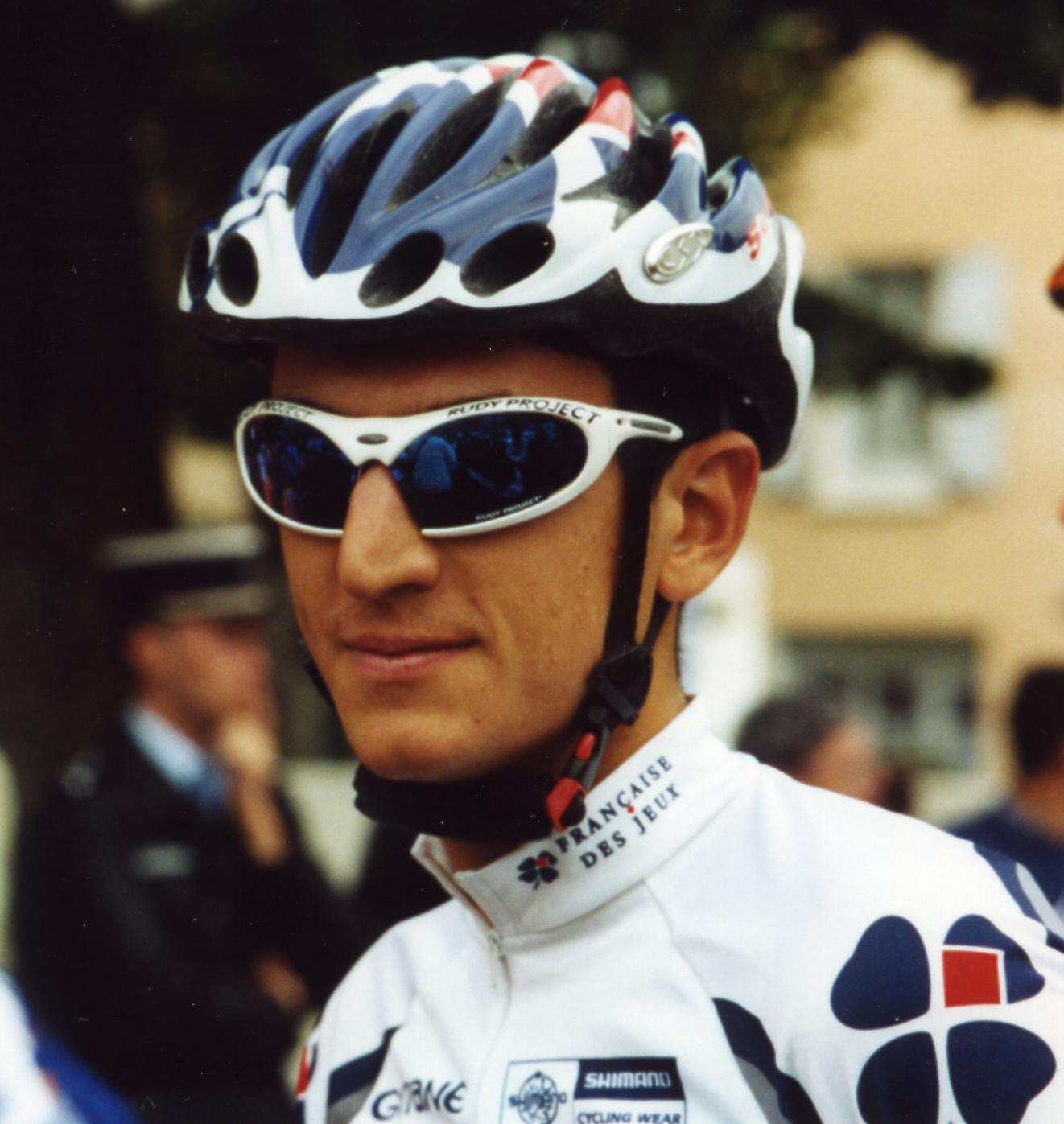

Personal information
- Full name: Nicolas Fritsch
- Born: 19 December 1978 (age 47) Paris, France

Cycling career
- Sport: Cycling
- Discipline: Road
- Role: Rider

Professional teams
- 1999: Saint-Quentin - Oktos - MBK
- 2000–2004: Française des Jeux
- 2005–2006: Saunier Duval-Prodir
- 2007: AVC Aix-en-Provence

Nicolas Fritsch (born 19 December 1978) is a French former professional road bicycle racer. He is a nephew of former professional cyclist Pierre Tosi.

== Major results ==
2003
1st, Tour du Finistère
1st, Stage 3, Paris–Corrèze
2007

1. 1st, Overall Circuit de Saône-et-Loire
2. 1st, Stage 1, Ronde de l'Oise
