= Nicole Brändli =

Swiss cyclist (born 1979)

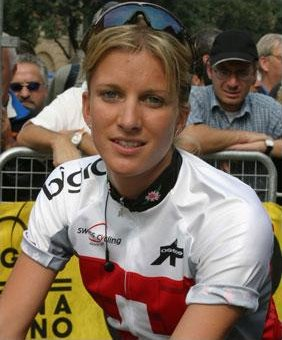

Personal information
- Full name: Nicole Brändli
- Born: 18 June 1979 (age 47)
- Height: 1.67 m (5 ft 6 in)
- Weight: 49 kg (108 lb)

Cycling career
- Sport: Cycling
- Current team: Bigla Cycling Team
- Discipline: Road
- Role: Rider
- Rider type: All-rounder

Major wins
- Giro d'Italia Femminile (2001, 2003, 2005)
Medal record
Representing Switzerland
Women's road cycling
UCI Road World Championships
Silver medal – second place	2002	Road race
Silver medal – second place	2001	Time trial
Silver medal – second place	2002	Time trial

Nicole Brändli (born 18 June 1979) is a professional cyclist from Switzerland. She is a three-time winner of Giro d'Italia Femminile. She was the Swiss National Road Race champion in 2001, 2002 and 2003. She also competed at the 2000 Summer Olympics, 2004 Summer Olympics and the 2008 Summer Olympics.

== Major results ==
1996
2nd Time Trial, National Junior Road Championships

1997
1st Berner Rundfahrt
2nd Time Trial, UCI Junior Road World Championships

1998
3rd Berner Rundfahrt

1999
UEC European Road Championships

2nd U23 Time Trial
3rd U23 Road Race

2nd Road Race, National Road Championships
3rd Rund Um die Rigi–Gersau
10th Road Race, UCI Road World Championships
10th Trofeo Alfredo Binda

2000
1st Time Trial, National Road Championships
2nd Overall Eko Tour Dookola Polski
2nd Berner Rundfahrt
3rd U23 Time Trial, UEC European Road Championships
3rd Giro del Lago Maggiore
9th La Flèche Wallonne

2001
National Road Championships

1st Road Race
3rd Time Trial

1st Overall Giro d'Italia Femminile

1st Stages 10 & 11

1st Overall Giro della Toscana Int. Femminile
1st Trofeo Alfredo Binda
UEC European Road Championships

1st U23 Time Trial
3rd U23 Road Race

2nd UCI Road World Championships – Women's time trial
2nd Overall Gracia–Orlová
3rd Berner Rundfahrt
6th UCI Road World Championships – Women's road race

2002
National Road Championships

1st Road Race
2nd Time Trial

1st Overall Vuelta Castilla y Leon
1st Stage 9 Grande Boucle Féminine Internationale
2nd Overall Giro del Trentino Alto Adige-Südtirol
2nd UCI Road World Championships – Women's time trial
2nd UCI Road World Championships – Women's road race
3rd Overall Giro della Toscana Int. Femminile
9th Trofeo Alfredo Binda

2003
1st Road Race, National Road Championships
1st Overall Giro d'Italia Femminile

1st Stage 3

1st Overall Gracia–Orlová
2nd Berner Rundfahrt
6th La Flèche Wallonne

2004
1st Overall Gracia–Orlová
1st GP Carnevale d'Europa
3rd Time Trial, National Road Championships
6th Road Race, UCI Road World Championships
8th La Flèche Wallonne

2005
1st Overall Giro d'Italia Femminile

1st Prologue, Stages 1 & 7

1st Overall Albstadt Frauen Etappenrennen

1st Stage 2

1st Bern–Oberbottigen
2nd Overall Giro del Trentino Alto Adige-Südtirol
2nd Road Race, National Road Championships
2nd Trofeo Citta' di Rosignano
3rd Souvenir Magali Pache
7th La Flèche Wallonne

2006
1st GP Ouest France
1st Stage 3 Giro della Toscana Int. Femminile
2nd Overall Giro d'Italia Femminile

1st Stage 1

2nd Overall Giro del Trentino Alto Adige-Südtirol
2nd Road Race, National Road Championships
3rd Overall Emakumeen Euskal Bira
3rd Overall Gracia–Orlová
3rd Giro del Lago Maggiore
8th Road Race, UCI Road World Championships
8th La Flèche Wallonne

2007
2nd Overall Giro d'Italia Femminile

1st Stage 5

2nd Overall Trophée d'Or Féminin

1st Stage 2

3rd Overall Emakumeen Euskal Bira
3rd Overall Albstadt Frauen Etappenrennen
3rd Road Race, National Road Championships
6th La Flèche Wallonne

2008
1st Leo Wirth Strassenrennen
1st Giro del Lago Maggiore
7th La Flèche Wallonne

2009
1st GP Raiffeisen
3rd Overall Giro d'Italia Femminile
3rd Chambéry
6th Overall Giro della Toscana Int. Femminile
8th Overall Thüringen-Rundfahrt der Frauen

1st Stage 1 (TTT)

8th Road Race, UCI Road World Championships

2016
3rd Overall Tour of Zhoushan Island I
