= Tetyana Styazhkina =

Ukrainian cyclist

Tetyana Styazhkina Тетяна Стяжкіна
Personal information
- Born: 10 April 1977 (age 49)

Cycling career
- Sport: Cycling
- Role: Rider

Managerial team
- 2000, 2008: Ukrainian Olympic Cycling Team

Tetyana Styazhkina, also written as Tetyana Stiajkina, (Ukrainian: Тетяна Стяжкіна; born 10 April 1977) is a Ukrainian cycle racer who rides for the Chirio Forno d'Asolo team. She is a climber, featured in the Vuelta a El Salvador.

She competed at the 2000 and 2008 Summer Olympics.

== U23 Career Highlights ==
=== 1999 ===
- European Road Championships - Time Trial
- European Road Championships - Road Race

== Elite Career Highlights ==
1997

- 1st, Giro della Toscana - Prologue

2000

- 1st, Tour de l'Aude - Stage 8
- 1st, Tour de Suisse - Stage 4

2002

- 1st, Ukrainian National Road Championships - Time Trial
- 1st, Trophée d'Or Féminin - General Classification
- 1st, Trophée d'Or Féminin - Stage 2
- 1st, Trophée d'Or Féminin - Stage 5
- 1st, Trophée d'Or Féminin - Stage 6

2003

- 1st, Eko Tour Dookola Polski - General Classification
- 1st, Eko Tour Dookola Polski - Stage 2

2007

- 1st, Grand Prix de Santa Ana
- 1st, Vuelta a El Salvador - Stage 1

2008

- 1st, Vuelta a El Salvador - General Classification
- 1st, Vuelta a El Salvador - Stage 4
- 1st, Ukrainian National Road Championships - Time Trial
- 1st, Ukrainian National Road Championships - Road Race
