= Élisabeth Chevanne Brunel =

French cyclist (born 1975)

Elisabeth Chevanne Brunel
Personal information
- Born: 2 March 1975 (age 51) France

Cycling career
- Sport: Cycling
- Discipline: Road cycling

Professional teams
- 2001–2002: C.A. Mantes La Ville
- 2005–2006: Les Pruneaux d'Agen

Elisabeth Chevanne Brunel (born 2 March 1975) is a road cyclist from France who represented her nation at the 1998, 1999 and 2004 UCI Road World Championships.
