= Anna Zugno =

Italian cyclist

Personal information
- Born: 30 April 1984 (age 42) Italy

Cycling career
- Sport: Cycling
- Discipline: Road cycling

Professional teams
- 2006–2007: Safi-Pasta Zara-Manhattan
- 2008–2009: Top Girls Fassa Bortolo Raxy Line

Anna Zugno (born 30 April 1984) is a road cyclist from Italy. She represented her nation at the 2003, 2004, 2005, 2007 and 2008 UCI Road World Championships.
