= 2014 European Road Championships =

- Venue: Nyon, Switzerland
- Date: 10–13 July 2014
- Nations participating: 36 (688 cyclists)
- Events: 8

The 2014 European Road Championships were held in Nyon, Switzerland, between 10 and 13 July 2014. The event consisted of a road race and a time trial for men and women under 23 and juniors. The championships were regulated by the European Cycling Union.

== Schedule ==
=== Individual time trial ===
Thursday 10 July 2014

- 09:15 Women under-23, 26.90 km
- 14:10 Men Juniors, 26.90 km

Friday 11 July 2014

- 09:30 Women Juniors, 13.45 km
- 14:00 Men under-23, 26.9 km

=== Road race ===
Saturday 12 July 2014

- 08:30 Women under-23, 129.60 km
- 14:15 Men Juniors, 129.60 km

Sunday 13 July 2014

- 08:30 Women Juniors, 86.4 km
- 13:30 Men under-23, 172.80 km

== Events summary ==
Event	Gold		Silver		Bronze	
Men's Under-23 Events
Road race	Stefan Küng; Switzerland	4 h 16' 05"	Iuri Filosi; Italy	+ 0"	Anthony Turgis; France	+ 0"
Time trial	Stefan Küng; Switzerland	33' 55.81"	Davide Martinelli; Italy	+ 24.15"	Alexander Evtushenko; Russia	+ 45.88"
Women's Under-23 Events
Road race	Sabrina Stultiens; Netherlands	3h 32' 35"	Elena Cecchini; Italy	+ 0"	Annabelle Dreville; France	+ 0"
Time trial	Mieke Kröger; Germany	40' 17.84"	Séverine Eraud; France	+ 3.04"	Ramona Forchini; Switzerland	+ 4.94"
Men's Junior Events
Road race	Edoardo Affini; Italy	3h 09' 38"	Jordi Warlop; Belgium	+ 0"	Pierre Idjouadiene; France	+ 2"
Time trial	Lennard Kämna; Germany	35' 35.58"	Corentin Ermenault; France	+ 26.75"	Tobias Foss; Norway	+ 35.87"
Women's Junior Events
Road race	Sofia Bertizzolo; Italy	2 h 23' 17"	Nicole Koller; Switzerland	+ 1"	Daria Egorova; Russia	+ 1"
Time trial	Aafke Soet; Netherlands	20' 17.08"	Alice Gasparini; Italy	+ 5.37"	Greta Richioud; France	+ 11.50"

== Participating nations ==
36 nations competed at the Championships.

== Medal table ==
Rank	Nation	Gold	Silver	Bronze	Total
1	Italy (ITA)	2	4	0	6
2	Switzerland (SUI)	2	1	1	4
3	Germany (GER)	2	0	0	2
3	Netherlands (NED)	2	0	0	2
5	France (FRA)	0	2	4	6
6	Belgium (BEL)	0	1	0	1
7	Russia (RUS)	0	0	2	2
8	Norway (NOR)	0	0	1	1
Totals (8 entries)		8	8	8	24
