= Monica Holler =

Swedish cyclist

Personal information
- Nationality: Swedish
- Born: May 15, 1984 (age 42) Laxå

Sport
- Sport: cycling

Monica Holler (born May 15, 1984, in Laxå) is a Swedish professional cyclist. She is part of the 2006 Bigla Cycling Team.

== Notable results ==
2002
3rd in World Road Race Championship, Juniors
2004
1st in European Road Race Championship, Espoirs
2nd in Tjejtrampet
2nd in Swedish National Road Race Championship, Elite
2005
2nd in Berner Rundfahrt
2nd in Tjejtrampet
2nd in Swedish National Time Trial Championship, Elite
2nd in European Road Race Championship, Espoirs
3rd in GP Ouest France
2006
1st in Parel van de Veluwe
2nd in Swedish National Road Race Championship, Elite
3rd in European Road Race Championship, Espoirs
3rd in Open de Suède Vårgårda
2007
2nd in 2007 Omloop Het Volk

2012 – Sengers Ladies Cycling Team 2012 season
