= 2017 Le Samyn des Dames =

Race details
- Dates: 1 March 2017
- Distance: 100.5 km (62.45 mi)
- Winning time: 2h 40' 21"

Results
	Winner	Sheyla Gutierrez (ESP)	(Cylance Pro Cycling)
	Second	Amy Pieters (NED)	(Boels–Dolmans)
	Third	Tiffany Cromwell (AUS)	(Canyon–SRAM)

The 2017 Le Samyn des Dames was the sixth running of the women's Le Samyn, a women's bicycle race in Hainaut, Belgium. It was held on 1 March 2017 over a distance of 100.5 kilometres (62.4 miles) starting in Quaregnon and finishing in Dour. It was rated by the UCI as a 1.2 category race.

== Result ==
Result
Rank	Rider	Team	Time
1	Sheyla Gutierrez (ESP)	Cylance Pro Cycling	2h 40' 21"
2	Amy Pieters (NED)	Boels–Dolmans	+ 0"
3	Tiffany Cromwell (AUS)	Canyon–SRAM	+ 2"
4	Romy Kasper (GER)	Alé–Cipollini	+ 7"
5	Jessy Druyts (BEL)	Sport Vlaanderen–Guill D'or	+ 12"
6	Ellen van Dijk (NED)	Team Sunweb	+1' 53"
7	Hannah Barnes (GBR)	Canyon–SRAM	+1' 53"
8	Małgorzata Jasińska (POL)	Cylance Pro Cycling	+1' 53"
9	Janneke Ensing (NED)	Alé–Cipollini	+1' 56"
10	Christina Siggaard (DEN)	Team Virtu Cycling	+2' 18"

== See also ==
- 2017 in women's road cycling
