= Druyts =

Druyts is a Flemish surname that may refer to

- Natalia Druyts (born 1980), Flemish recording artist and performer
- A family of Flemish racing cyclists including:
  - Demmy Druyts (born 1995)
  - Gerry Druyts (born 1991)
  - Jessy Druyts (born 1994)
  - Kelly Druyts (born 1989)
  - Lenny Druyts (born 1997)
