= Marjolein van 't Geloof =

Dutch cyclist

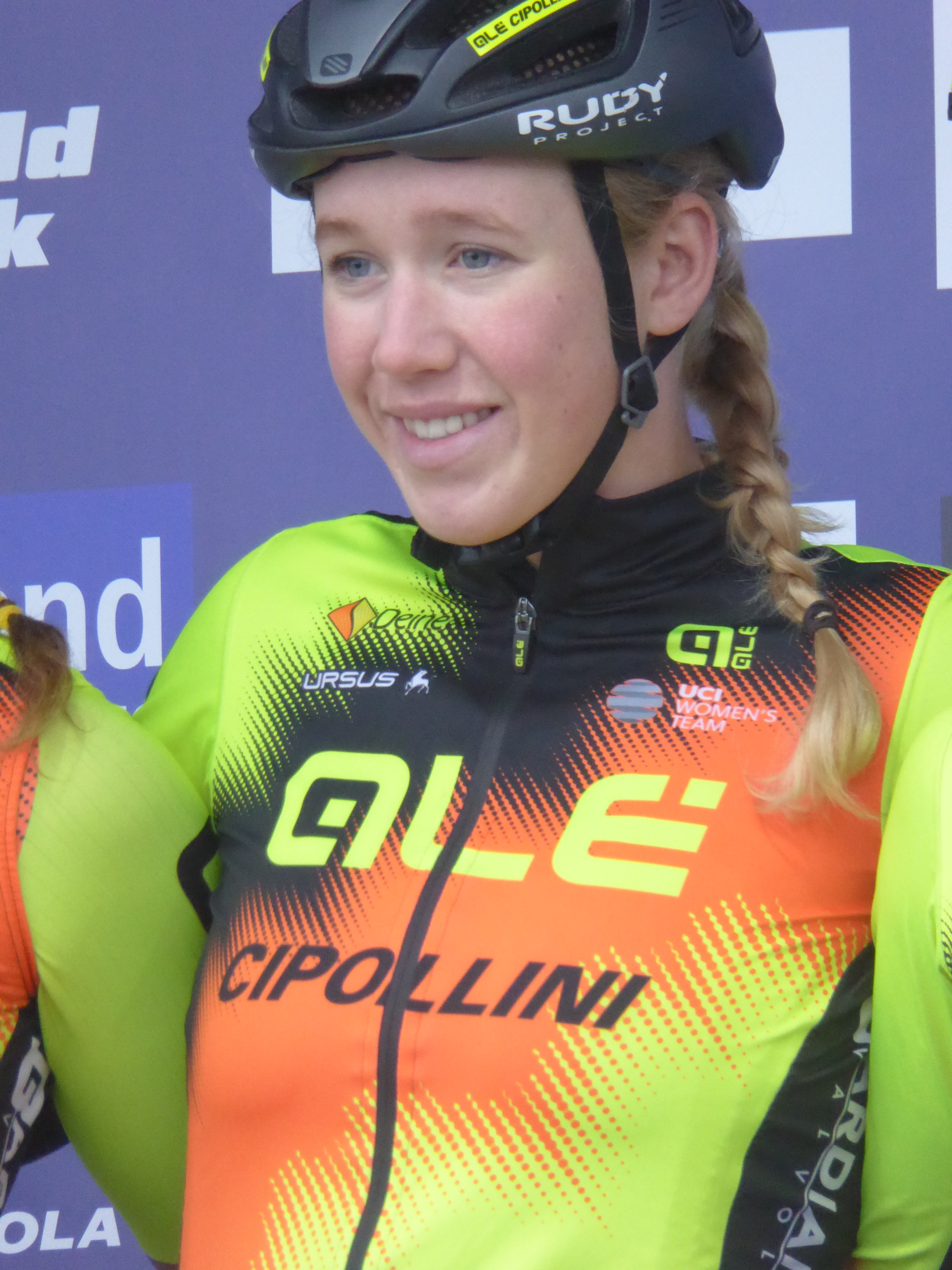
- Van 't Geloof at the 2019 Women's Tour of Scotland

Personal information
- Full name: Maria Apolonia van 't Geloof
- Born: 27 March 1996 (age 30) Dirksland, Netherlands

Cycling career
- Sport: Cycling
- Current team: Laboral Kutxa–Fundación Euskadi
- Discipline: Road
- Role: Rider
- Rider type: Classics specialist

Amateur team
- 2015–2017: Jan van Arckel

Professional teams
- 2018: Lotto–Soudal Ladies
- 2019: Alé–Cipollini
- 2020–2022: Drops
- 2023: Human Powered Health
- 2024: Hess Cycling Team
- 2025: Arkéa–B&B Hotels Women
- 2026: Laboral Kutxa–Fundación Euskadi

Maria Apolonia "Marjolein" van 't Geloof (born 27 March 1996) is a Dutch professional racing cyclist, who rides for UCI Women's ProTeam Laboral Kutxa–Fundación Euskadi. During her career, Van' t Geloof has taken one professional victory, at the 2022 Grote Prijs Beerens.

== Major results ==
2014
1st Young rider classification, BeNe Ladies Tour
2nd Road race, National Junior Road Championships
7th Road race, UEC European Junior Road Championships
2015
6th Omloop van de IJsseldelta
2016
7th Erondegemse Pijl
2017
National Track Championships

1st Points race
2nd Scratch

8th Dwars door de Westhoek
8th Omloop van de IJsseldelta
10th Road race, National Road Championships
2018
3rd Omloop van de Westhoek
3rd 7-Dorpenomloop Aalburg
4th Omloop van Borsele
5th Erondegemse Pijl
5th Flanders Ladies Classic
6th Trofee Maarten Wynants
10th Le Samyn des Dames
2019
3rd Trofee Maarten Wynants
8th Nokere Koerse voor Dames
2020
8th Le Samyn des Dames
2021
National Track Championships

1st Madison (with Nina Kessler)
3rd Scratch

5th Le Samyn des Dames
10th Omloop van de Westhoek
2022
1st Grote Prijs Beerens
2nd Binche Chimay Binche pour Dames
5th Nokere Koerse voor Dames
6th Le Samyn des Dames
7th Omloop der Kempen
2023
4th Argenta Classic-2 Districtenpijl
5th GP Oetingen
6th Le Samyn des Dames
8th Konvert Koerse
9th Omloop der Kempen
2024
3rd Omloop der Kempen
5th Cyclis Classic
7th Drentse Acht van Westerveld
7th La Choralis Fourmies Féminine
8th GP Eco-Struct
8th Trofee Maarten Wynants
9th La Picto–Charentaise
2025
4th Nokere Koerse voor Dames
4th Gent–Wevelgem
7th Le Samyn des Dames
9th Trofeo Marratxí–Felanitx
2026
8th Tour of Bruges Women
