= 2022 Le Samyn des Dames =

Race details
- Dates: 1 March 2022
- Distance: 99.4 km (61.76 mi)
- Winning time: 2h 20' 04"

Results
| | Winner | Emma Norsgaard (DEN) | (Movistar Team) |
| | Second | Chiara Consonni (ITA) | (Movistar Team) |
| | Third | Vittoria Guazzini (ITA) | (FDJ Nouvelle-Aquitaine Futuroscope) |

The 2022 Le Samyn des Dames was the 11th running of the women's Le Samyn, a women's bicycle race in Hainaut, Belgium. It was held on 1 March 2021 over a distance of 99.4 kilometres (61.8 miles) starting in Quaregnon and finishing in Dour. It was rated by the UCI as a 1.2 category race.

== Result ==
Result
| Rank | Rider | Team | Time |
|---|---|---|---|
| 1 | Emma Norsgaard (DEN) | Movistar Team | 2h 36' 17" |
| 2 | Chiara Consonni (ITA) | Valcar–Travel & Service | + 0" |
| 3 | Vittoria Guazzini (ITA) | FDJ Nouvelle-Aquitaine Futuroscope | + 0" |
| 4 | Susanne Andersen (NOR) | Uno-X Pro Cycling Team | + 0" |
| 5 | Clara Copponi (FRA) | FDJ Nouvelle-Aquitaine Futuroscope | + 0" |
| 6 | Marjolein van 't Geloof (NED) | Le Col–Wahoo | + 0" |
| 7 | Shirin van Anrooij (NED) | Trek–Segafredo | + 0" |
| 8 | Alice Barnes (GBR) | Canyon//SRAM | + 0" |
| 9 | Shari Bossuyt (BEL) | Canyon//SRAM | + 0" |
| 10 | Laura Tomasi (ITA) | UAE Team ADQ | + 0" |

== See also ==
- 2022 in women's road cycling
