= 2014 BeNe Ladies Tour =

Race details
- Dates: 19–20 July 2014
- Stages: 3 stages
- Distance: 199.4 km (123.9 mi)
- Winning time: 4h 49' 23"

Results
	Winner	Emma Johansson (SWE)	(Orica–AIS)
	Second	Jolien D'Hoore (BEL)	(Lotto–Belisol Ladies)
	Third	Shara Gillow (AUS)	(Orica–AIS)

The 2014 BeNe Ladies Tour is the first edition of the BeNe Ladies Tour, a women's cycling stage race in the Netherlands and Belgium. It is rated by the UCI as a category 2.2 race and is held between 19 and 20 July 2014.

== Stages ==
=== Stage 1 ===
19 July 2014 – Sint-Laureins to Sint-Laureins, 103.6 km (64.4 mi)

Stage 1 result

	Rider	Team	Time
1	Jolien D'Hoore (BEL)	Lotto–Belisol Ladies	2h 28' 26"
2	Amy Pieters (NED)	Giant–Shimano	s.t.
3	Emma Johansson (SWE)	Orica–AIS	s.t.
4	Leah Kirchmann (CAN)	Optum–Kelly Benefit Strategies	s.t.
5	Loes Gunnewijk (NED)	Orica–AIS	s.t.
6	Megan Guarnier (USA)	Boels–Dolmans	s.t.
7	Julie Leth (DEN)	Team Hitec Products	s.t.
8	Nina Kessler (NED)	Boels–Dolmans	s.t.
9	Nel de Crits (BEL)	Topsport Vlaanderen–Pro-Duo	s.t.
10	Sanne Cant (BEL)		s.t.

General Classification after Stage 1

	Rider	Team	Time
1	Jolien D'Hoore (BEL)	Lotto–Belisol Ladies	2h 28' 13"
2	Amy Pieters (NED)	Giant–Shimano	+ 4"
3	Emma Johansson (SWE)	Orica–AIS	+ 5"
4	Loes Gunnewijk (NED)	Orica–AIS	+ 12"
5	Leah Kirchmann (CAN)	Optum–Kelly Benefit Strategies	+ 13"
6	Megan Guarnier (USA)	Boels–Dolmans	+ 13"
7	Julie Leth (DEN)	Team Hitec Products	+ 13"
8	Nina Kessler (NED)	Boels–Dolmans	+ 13"
9	Nel de Crits (BEL)	Topsport Vlaanderen–Pro-Duo	+ 13"
10	Sanne Cant (BEL)		+ 13"

=== Stage 2a ===
20 July 2014, – Philippine to Philippine (individual time trial), 9.7 km (6.0 mi)

Stage 2a Result

	Rider	Team	Time
1	Emma Johansson (SWE)	Orica–AIS	12' 22"
2	Vera Koedooder (NED)	Cobra9 Intebuild Racing Team	+ 5"
3	Brianna Walle (USA)	Optum–Kelly Benefit Strategies	+ 5"
4	Loes Gunnewijk (NED)	Orica–AIS	+ 5"
5	Shara Gillow (AUS)	Orica–AIS	+ 9"
6	Jolien D'Hoore (BEL)	Lotto–Belisol Ladies	+ 9"
7	Jessie MacLean (AUS)	Orica–AIS	+ 11"
8	Megan Guarnier (USA)	Boels–Dolmans	+ 12"
9	Leah Kirchmann (CAN)	Optum–Kelly Benefit Strategies	+ 16"
10	Lotta Lepistö (FIN)	Cobra9 Intebuild Racing Team	+ 19"

General Classification after Stage 2a

	Rider	Team	Time
1	Emma Johansson (SWE)	Orica–AIS	2h 40' 40"
2	Jolien D'Hoore (BEL)	Lotto–Belisol Ladies	+ 6"
3	Loes Gunnewijk (NED)	Orica–AIS	+ 12"
4	Vera Koedooder (NED)	Cobra9 Intebuild Racing Team	+ 13"
5	Shara Gillow (AUS)	Orica–AIS	+ 17"
6	Amy Pieters (NED)	Giant–Shimano	+ 22"
7	Megan Guarnier (USA)	Boels–Dolmans	+ 24"
8	Leah Kirchmann (CAN)	Optum–Kelly Benefit Strategies	+ 27"
9	Julie Leth (DEN)	Team Hitec Products	+ 31"
10	Marijn de Vries (NED)	Giant–Shimano	+ 33"

=== Stage 2b ===
20 July 2014 – Philippine to Philippine, 86.1 km (53.5 mi)

Stage 2b Result

	Rider	Team	Time
1	Jolien D'Hoore (BEL)}	Lotto–Belisol Ladies	2h 08' 48"
2	Emma Johansson (SWE)	Orica–AIS	s.t.
3	Amy Pieters (NED)	Orica–AIS	s.t.
4	Megan Guarnier (USA)	Boels–Dolmans	s.t.
5	Rossella Ratto (ITA)	Estado de México–Faren Kuota	s.t.
6	Kendall Ryan (USA)	Team TIBCO–To The Top	s.t.
7	Kelly Druyts (BEL)	Topsport Vlaanderen–Pro-Duo	s.t.
8	Moniek Tenniglo (NED)		s.t.
9	Monique van de Ree (NED)	Parkhotel Valkenburg Continental Team	s.t.
10	Leah Kirchmann (CAN)	Optum–Kelly Benefit Strategies	s.t.

Final General Classification

	Rider	Team	Time
1	Emma Johansson (SWE)	Orica–AIS	4h 49' 23"
2	Jolien D'Hoore (BEL)	Lotto–Belisol Ladies	+ 2"
3	Shara Gillow (AUS)	Orica–AIS	+ 22"
4	Amy Pieters (NED)	Giant–Shimano	+ 23"
5	Megan Guarnier (USA)	Boels–Dolmans	+ 29"
6	Leah Kirchmann (CAN)	Optum–Kelly Benefit Strategies	+ 32"
7	Vera Koedooder (NED)	Cobra9 Intebuild Racing Team	+ 36"
8	Liesbet De Vocht (BEL)	Lotto–Belisol Ladies	+ 42"
9	Jade Wilcoxson (USA)	Optum–Kelly Benefit Strategies	+ 1' 03"
10	Nina Kessler (NED)	Boels–Dolmans	+ 1' 25"

== Classification leadership ==
Stage	Winner	General classification	Points classification	Young rider classification
1	Jolien D'Hoore	Jolien D'Hoore	Jolien D'Hoore	Julie Leth
2a	Emma Johansson	Emma Johansson	Emma Johansson	Julie Leth
2b	Jolien D'Hoore	Emma Johansson	Jolien D'Hoore	Marjolein Van't Geloof
Final Classification		Emma Johansson	Jolien D'Hoore	Marjolein Van't Geloof

== See also ==
- 2014 in women's road cycling
