= 2019 Le Samyn des Dames =

Race details
- Dates: 5 March 2019
- Distance: 102.1 km (63.44 mi)
- Winning time: 2h 32' 10"

Results
	Winner	Jip van den Bos (NED)	(Boels–Dolmans)
	Second	Daniela Gass (GER)	
	Third	Demi de Jong (NED)	(Lotto–Soudal Ladies)

The 2019 Le Samyn des Dames was the eighth running of the women's Le Samyn, a women's bicycle race in Hainaut, Belgium. It was held on 5 March 2019 over a distance of 102.1 kilometres (63.4 miles) starting in Quaregnon and finishing in Dour. It was rated by the UCI as a 1.2 category race.

== Result ==
Result
Rank	Rider	Team	Time
1	Jip van den Bos (NED)	Boels–Dolmans	2h 032' 10"
2	Daniela Gass (GER)	–	+ 56"
3	Demi de Jong (NED)	Lotto–Soudal Ladies	+ 56"
4	Lauretta Hanson (AUS)	Trek–Segafredo	+ 56"
5	Barbara Guarischi (ITA)	Team Virtu Cycling	+ 56"
6	Romy Kasper (GER)	Alé–Cipollini	+ 56"
7	Małgorzata Jasińska (POL)	Movistar Team	+ 58"
8	Marta Bastianelli (ITA)	Team Virtu Cycling	+1 37"
9	Lotte Kopecky (BEL)	Lotto–Soudal Ladies	+1 37"
10	Eugénie Duval (FRA)	FDJ Nouvelle-Aquitaine Futuroscope	+1 37"

== See also ==
- 2019 in women's road cycling
