= 2022 Le Samyn =

2022 UCI Europe Tour
- Poster with previous winners Merlier and Kopecky

Race details
- Dates: 1 March 2022
- Stages: 1
- Distance: 209 km (129.9 mi)
- Winning time: 4h 49' 29"

Results
	Winner	Matteo Trentin (ITA)	(UAE Team Emirates)
	Second	Hugo Hofstetter (FRA)	(Arkéa–Samsic)
	Third	Dries De Bondt (BEL)	(Alpecin–Fenix)

The 2022 Le Samyn was the 54th edition of the Le Samyn road cycling one day race in Belgium. It was a 1.1-rated event on the 2022 UCI Europe Tour and the first event in the 2022 Belgian Road Cycling Cup. The 209 kilometres (130 mi) long race started in Quaregnon and finished in Dour, with almost four laps of a finishing circuit that featured several cobbled sections and climbs.

== Teams ==
Eleven UCI WorldTeams, eight UCI ProTeams, and six UCI Continental teams made up the twenty-five teams that participated in the race. 116 of 164 riders finished the race.

UCI WorldTeams

- AG2R Citroën Team
- Cofidis
- Bora–Hansgrohe
- Intermarché–Wanty–Gobert Matériaux
- Israel–Premier Tech
- Lotto–Soudal
- Quick-Step Alpha Vinyl Team
- Team DSM
- Team Jumbo–Visma
- Trek–Segafredo
- UAE Team Emirates

UCI ProTeams

- Alpecin–Fenix
- Arkéa–Samsic
- B&B Hotels–KTM
- Bingoal Pauwels Sauces WB
- Human Powered Health
- Sport Vlaanderen–Baloise
- Team TotalEnergies
- Uno-X Pro Cycling Team

UCI Continental Teams

- BEAT Cycling
- Go Sport–Roubaix–Lille Métropole
- Équipe Continentale Groupama–FDJ
- Leopard Pro Cycling
- Minerva Cycling Team
- Tarteletto–Isorex

== Result ==
Result
Rank	Rider	Team	Time
1	Matteo Trentin (ITA)	UAE Team Emirates	4h 49' 29"
2	Hugo Hofstetter (FRA)	Arkéa–Samsic	+ 0"
3	Dries De Bondt (BEL)	Alpecin–Fenix	+ 0"
4	Stan Dewulf (BEL)	AG2R Citroën Team	+ 0"
5	Loïc Vliegen (BEL)	Intermarché–Wanty–Gobert Matériaux	+ 0"
6	Victor Campenaerts (BEL)	Lotto–Soudal	+ 0"
7	Dries Van Gestel (BEL)	Team TotalEnergies	+ 0"
8	Bert Van Lerberghe (BEL)	Quick-Step Alpha Vinyl Team	+ 0"
9	Rasmus Tiller (NOR)	Uno-X Pro Cycling Team	+ 4"
10	Arnaud De Lie (BEL)	Lotto–Soudal	+ 4"
