= Laura Tomasi =

Italian cyclist

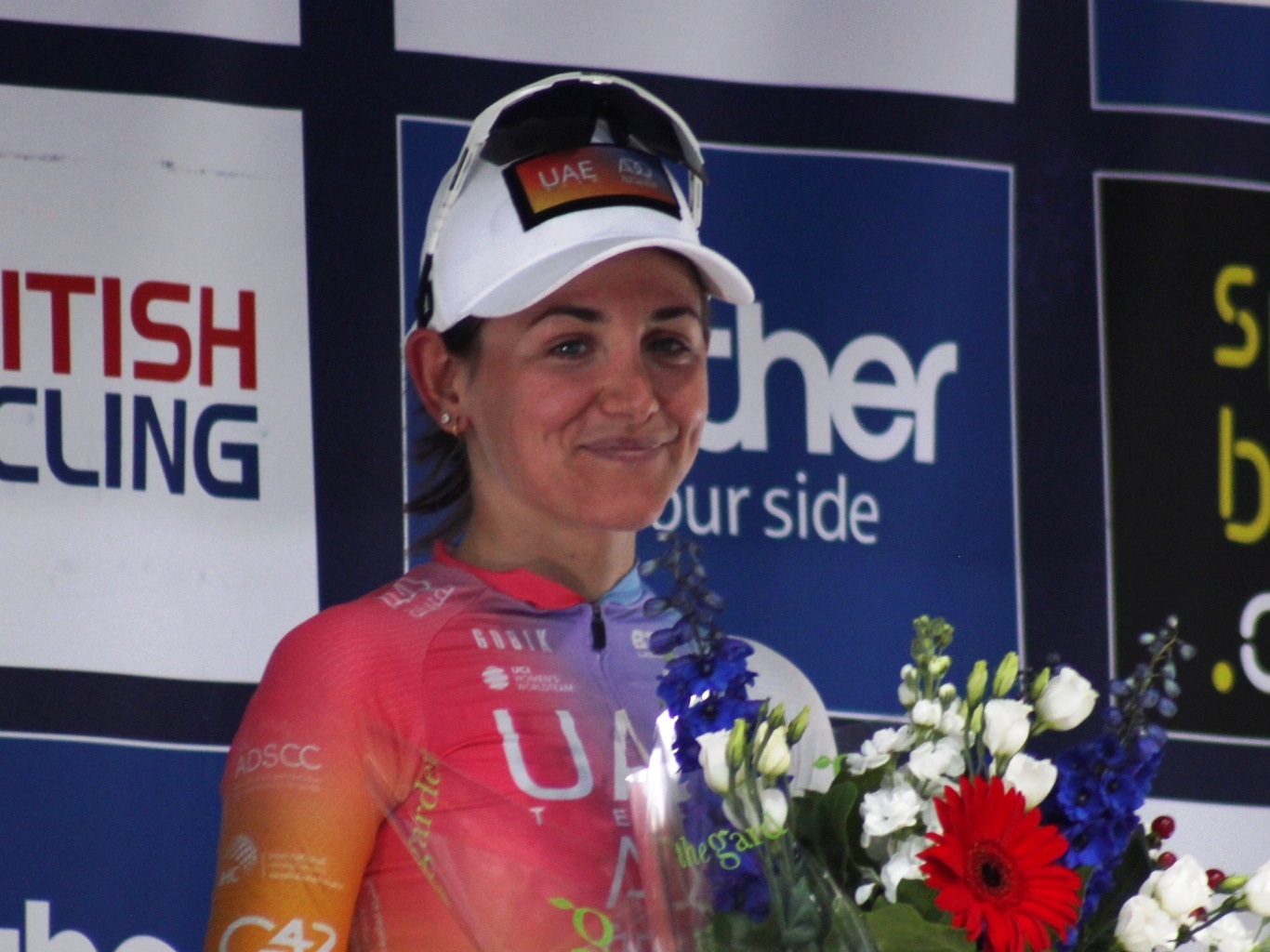
- Laura Tomasi in 2022

Personal information
- Full name: Laura Tomasi
- Born: 1 July 1999 (age 27)

Cycling career
- Sport: Cycling
- Current team: Uno-X Mobility
- Discipline: Road
- Role: Rider

Professional teams
- 2018–2020: Top Girls Fassa Bortolo
- 2021–2023: Alé BTC Ljubljana
- 2024–2025: Laboral Kutxa–Fundación Euskadi
- 2026-: Uno-X Mobility

Laura Tomasi (born 1 July 1999) is an Italian professional racing cyclist who currently rides for UCI Women's WorldTeam Uno-X Mobility.

== Career ==
Tomasi began riding for Laboral Kutxa–Fundación Euskadi in 2024. In the same year, she finished in fifth place at the Clásica de Almería, and finished in ninth place on the fifth stage of the women's Giro d'Italia.

In 2025, following a run of second and third-place results, Tomasi won the Grand Prix El Salvador, her first UCI victory. The race finished in a bunch sprint, in which she finished ahread of Sara Fiorin and Mia Griffin to take the win. In September 2025 it was announced that she would be joining Uno-X Mobility from 2026 for two seasons.

== Personal life ==
In 2022, Tomasi posted a video on social media raising awareness of the dangers of cycling, having almost been hit by a car. In 2025, she graduated with a degree in Business Economics and Management.

== Major results ==
2016
5th Trofeo Da Moreno–Piccolo Trofeo Alfredo Binda
2017
8th Trofeo Da Moreno–Piccolo Trofeo Alfredo Binda
2018
8th Gran Premio Bruno Beghelli Internazionale Donne Elite
8th Erondegemse Pijl
2019
1st Trofeo Oro in Euro, Montignoso
2nd Trofee Maarten Wynants
2021
7th Le Samyn
2022
10th Le Samyn
2023
10th Trofee Maarten Wynants
2024
4th La Choralis Fourmies Féminine
5th Grand Prix International d'Isbergues
5th Clásica de Almería
8th Trofeo Felanitx-Colònia de Sant Jordi (Ses Salines)
2025
7th Trofeo Marratxi-Felanitx
