= 2018 Le Samyn des Dames =

Race details
- Dates: 27 February 2018
- Distance: 103.0 km (64.00 mi)
- Winning time: 3h 01' 12"

Results
	Winner	Janneke Ensing (NED)	(Alé–Cipollini)
	Second	Floortje Mackaij (NED)	(Team Sunweb)
	Third	Lauren Kitchen (AUS)	(FDJ Nouvelle-Aquitaine Futuroscope)

The 2018 Le Samyn des Dames was the seventh running of the women's Le Samyn, a women's bicycle race in Hainaut, Belgium. It was held on 27 February 2018 over a distance of 103.0 kilometres (64.0 miles) starting in Quaregnon and finishing in Dour. It was rated by the UCI as a 1.2 category race.

== Result ==
Result
Rank	Rider	Team	Time
1	Janneke Ensing (NED)	Alé–Cipollini	3h 01' 12"
2	Floortje Mackaij (NED)	Team Sunweb	+ 4"
3	Lauren Kitchen (AUS)	FDJ Nouvelle-Aquitaine Futuroscope	+ 4"
4	Soraya Paladin (ITA)	Alé–Cipollini	+ 4"
5	Nathalie van Gogh (NED)	Parkhotel Valkenburg	+ 8"
6	Sheyla Gutierrez (ESP)	Cylance Pro Cycling	+ 30"
7	Nina Kessler (NED)	Hitec Products–Birk Sport	+ 47"
8	Lorena Wiebes (NED)	Parkhotel Valkenburg	+ 47"
9	Roxane Fournier (FRA)	FDJ Nouvelle-Aquitaine Futuroscope	+ 47"
10	Marjolein van 't Geloof (NED)	Lotto–Soudal Ladies	+ 47"

== See also ==
- 2018 in women's road cycling
