= Kaat Hannes =

Belgian cyclist

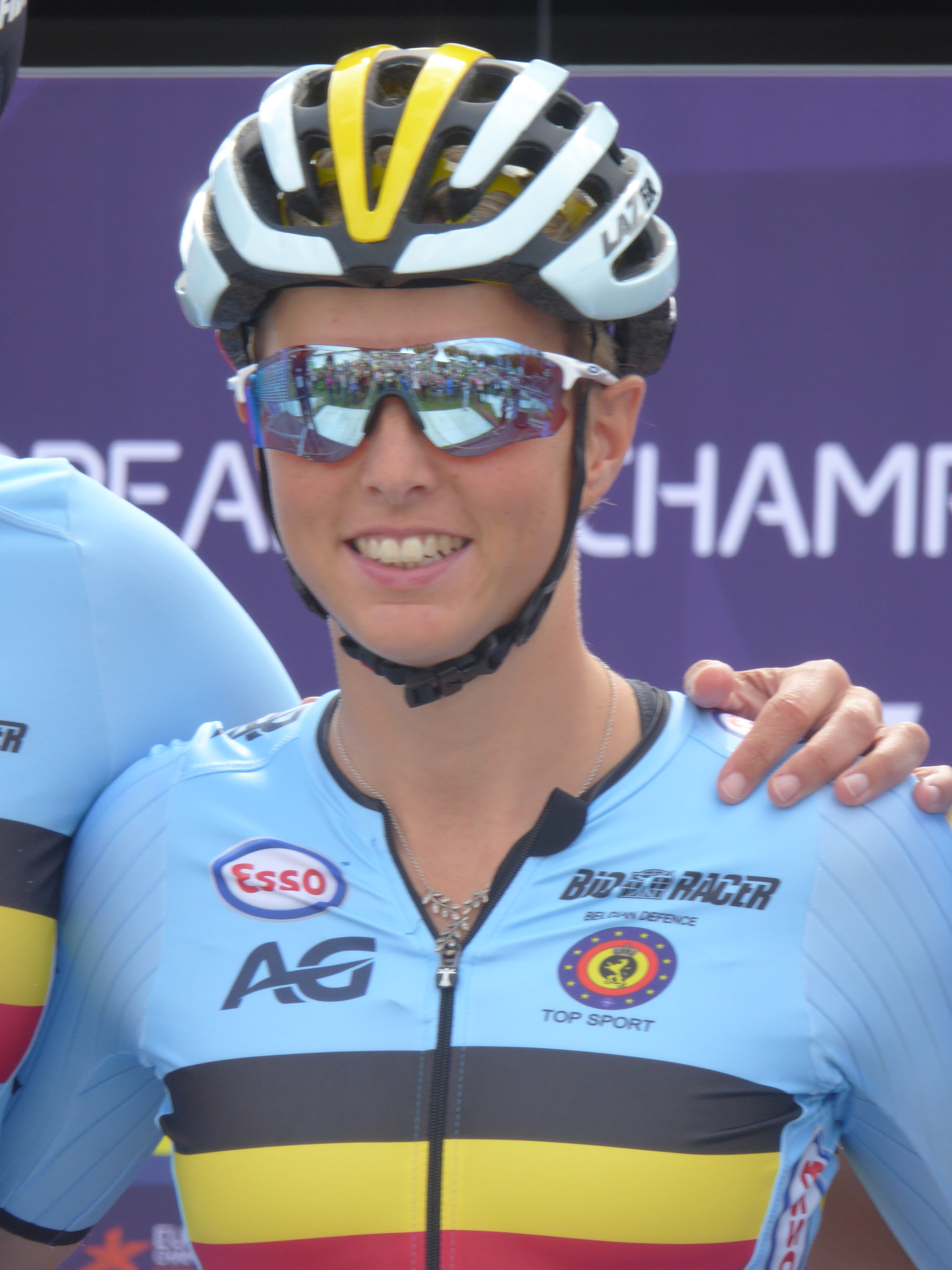
- Hannes at the 2018 European Road Cycling Championships.

Personal information
- Full name: Kaat Hannes
- Born: 21 November 1991 (age 34) Herentals, Belgium

Cycling career
- Sport: Cycling
- Current team: Retired
- Discipline: Road
- Role: Rider

Amateur team
- 2018–2019: Jos Feron Lady Force

Professional teams
- 2011: Topsport Vlaanderen–Ridley
- 2012–2013: Lotto–Belisol Ladies
- 2014–2015: Topsport Vlaanderen–Pro-Duo
- 2016–2017: Lensworld–Zannata
- 2020: Doltcini–Van Eyck Sport

Kaat Hannes (born 21 November 1991) is a Belgian former road cyclist, who rode professionally between 2011 and 2017, and also in 2020, for the Lotto–Belisol Ladies, Topsport Vlaanderen–Pro-Duo, Lensworld–Kuota and Doltcini–Van Eyck–Proximus teams. She participated at the 2012 UCI Road World Championships.

== Major results ==
2008
7th Road race, UEC European Junior Road Championships
2009
6th Road race, UCI Junior World Championships
2011
10th Gooik–Geraardsbergen–Gooik
2012
4th Erondegemse Pijl
6th Halle-Buizingen
8th Omloop van het Hageland
9th Le Samyn
2013
9th Sparkassen Giro Bochum
10th Road race, UEC European Under-23 Road Championships
2014
8th Trofee Maarten Wynants
2015
3rd Team road race, Military World Games
7th Diamond Tour
2016
1st Road race, National Road Championships
5th 7-Dorpenomloop Aalburg
2017
6th Trofee Maarten Wynants
2018
1st Stage 5 Gracia–Orlová
4th Flanders Ladies Classic
6th Omloop van Borsele
7th Road race, UEC European Road Championships
8th 7-Dorpenomloop Aalburg
10th Overall Belgium Tour
10th Omloop van het Hageland
10th Trofee Maarten Wynants
2019
9th Diamond Tour
