= 2025 Le Samyn =

2025 UCI Europe Tour
- Official poster with previous winner Laurenz Rex

Race details
- Dates: 4 March 2025
- Stages: 1
- Distance: 199.1 km (123.7 mi)
- Winning time: 4h 19' 39"

Results
| | Winner | Mathieu van der Poel (NED) | (Alpecin–Deceuninck) |
| | Second | Paul Magnier (FRA) | (Soudal–Quick-Step) |
| | Third | Emilien Jeannière (FRA) | (Team TotalEnergies) |

The 2025 Le Samyn was the 57th edition of the Le Samyn road cycling one day race in Belgium. It was a 1.1-rated event on the 2025 UCI Europe Tour and the first event in the 2025 Belgian Road Cycling Cup. The 199.1 kilometres (123.7 mi) long race started in Quaregnon and finished in Dour, with almost four laps of a finishing circuit that featured several cobbled sections and climbs.

== Teams ==
Nine UCI WorldTeams, eight UCI ProTeams, and eight UCI Continental teams made up the twenty-five teams that participated in the race.

UCI WorldTeams

- Alpecin–Deceuninck
- Arkéa–B&B Hotels
- Groupama–FDJ
- Intermarché–Wanty
- Lidl–Trek
- Soudal–Quick-Step
- Team Bahrain Victorious
- Team Picnic–PostNL
- XDS Astana Team

UCI ProTeams

- Euskaltel–Euskadi
- Lotto
- Team Flanders–Baloise
- Team Novo Nordisk
- Team TotalEnergies
- Unibet Tietema Rockets
- Uno-X Mobility
- Wagner Bazin WB

UCI Continental Teams

- BEAT Cycling Club
- Diftar Continental Cyclingteam
- Illes Balears Arabay
- Israel–Premier Tech
- Tarteletto–Isorex
- Team Lotto–Kern Haus PSD Bank
- Van Rysel–Roubaix
- VolkerWessels Cycling Team

== Result ==
Result
| Rank | Rider | Team | Time |
|---|---|---|---|
| 1 | Mathieu van der Poel (NED) | Alpecin–Deceuninck | 4h 19' 39" |
| 2 | Paul Magnier (FRA) | Soudal–Quick-Step | + 0" |
| 3 | Emilien Jeannière (FRA) | Team TotalEnergies | + 0" |
| 4 | Jenthe Biermans (BEL) | Arkéa–B&B Hotels | + 0" |
| 5 | Lewis Askey (GBR) | Groupama–FDJ | + 0" |
| 6 | Stian Fredheim (NOR) | Uno-X Mobility | + 0" |
| 7 | Hugo Hofstetter (FRA) | Israel–Premier Tech | + 0" |
| 8 | Alessandro Romele (ITA) | XDS Astana Team | + 0" |
| 9 | Amaury Capiot (BEL) | Arkéa–B&B Hotels | + 0" |
| 10 | Lukáš Kubiš (SVK) | Unibet Tietema Rockets | + 0" |
