= 2020 Le Samyn des Dames =

Race details
- Dates: 3 March 2020
- Distance: 94.9 km (58.97 mi)
- Winning time: 2h 35' 01"

Results
	Winner	Chantal van den Broek-Blaak (NED)	(Boels–Dolmans)
	Second	Christine Majerus (LUX)	(Boels–Dolmans)
	Third	Lotte Kopecky (NED)	(Lotto–Soudal Ladies)

The 2020 Le Samyn des Dames was the ninth running of the women's Le Samyn, a women's bicycle race in Hainaut, Belgium. It was held on 3 March 2020 over a distance of 94.9 kilometres (59.0 miles) starting in Quaregnon and finishing in Dour. It was rated by the UCI as a 1.2 category race.

== Result ==
Result
Rank	Rider	Team	Time
1	Chantal van den Broek-Blaak (NED)	Boels–Dolmans	2h 032' 10"
2	Christine Majerus (LUX)	Boels–Dolmans	+1' 50"
3	Lotte Kopecky (BEL)	Lotto–Soudal Ladies	+1' 50"
4	Jip van den Bos (NED)	Boels–Dolmans	+1' 50"
5	Ellen van Dijk (NED)	Trek–Segafredo	+1' 50"
6	Aude Biannic (FRA)	Movistar Team	+1' 56"
7	Lonneke Uneken (NED)	Boels–Dolmans	+3' 43"
8	Marjolein van 't Geloof (NED)	Drops	+3' 43"
9	Claire Faber (LUX)	Illi-Bikes	+3' 43"
10	Alba Teruel (ESP)	Movistar Team	+3' 43"

== See also ==
- 2020 in women's road cycling
