= 2023 Le Samyn =

2023 UCI Europe Tour
- Poster with previous winners Matteo Trentin and Emma Norsgaard

Race details
- Dates: 28 February 2023
- Stages: 1
- Distance: 209 km (129.9 mi)
- Winning time: 4h 49' 28"

Results
	Winner	Milan Menten (BEL)	(Lotto–Dstny)
	Second	Hugo Hofstetter (FRA)	(Arkéa–Samsic)
	Third	Edward Theuns (BEL)	(Trek–Segafredo)

The 2023 Le Samyn was the 55th edition of the Le Samyn road cycling one day race in Belgium. It was a 1.1-rated event on the 2023 UCI Europe Tour and the first event in the 2023 Belgian Road Cycling Cup. The 209 kilometres (130 mi) long race started in Quaregnon and finished in Dour, with almost four laps of a finishing circuit that featured several cobbled sections and climbs.

== Teams ==
Seven UCI WorldTeams, seven UCI ProTeams, and seven UCI Continental teams made up the twenty-one teams that participated in the race. 73 of 145 riders finished the race.

UCI WorldTeams

- AG2R Citroën Team
- Alpecin–Deceuninck
- Arkéa–Samsic
- Intermarché–Circus–Wanty
- Quick-Step Alpha Vinyl Team
- Team DSM
- Trek–Segafredo

UCI ProTeams

- Bingoal WB
- Human Powered Health
- Israel–Premier Tech
- Lotto–Dstny
- Team Flanders–Baloise
- Q36.5 Pro Cycling Team
- Uno-X Pro Cycling Team

UCI Continental Teams

- AT85 Pro Cycling
- Go Sport–Roubaix–Lille Métropole
- Matériel-vélo.com
- Leopard TOGT Pro Cycling
- Tarteletto–Isorex
- Team Ecoflo Chronos
- X-Speed United

== Result ==
Result
Rank	Rider	Team	Time
1	Milan Menten (BEL)	Lotto–Dstny	4h 49' 28"
2	Hugo Hofstetter (FRA)	Arkéa–Samsic	+ 0"
3	Edward Theuns (BEL)	Trek–Segafredo	+ 0"
4	Alberto Dainese (ITA)	Team DSM	+ 0"
5	Luca Mozzato (ITA)	Arkéa–Samsic	+ 0"
6	Søren Kragh Andersen (DEN)	Alpecin–Deceuninck	+ 0"
7	Pierre Gautherat (FRA)	AG2R Citroën Team	+ 0"
8	Mike Teunissen (NED)	Intermarché–Circus–Wanty	+ 0"
9	Vito Braet (BEL)	Team Flanders–Baloise	+ 0"
10	Andreas Stokbro (DEN)	Leopard TOGT Pro Cycling	+ 0"
