= Gladys Verhulst =

French cyclist (born 1997)

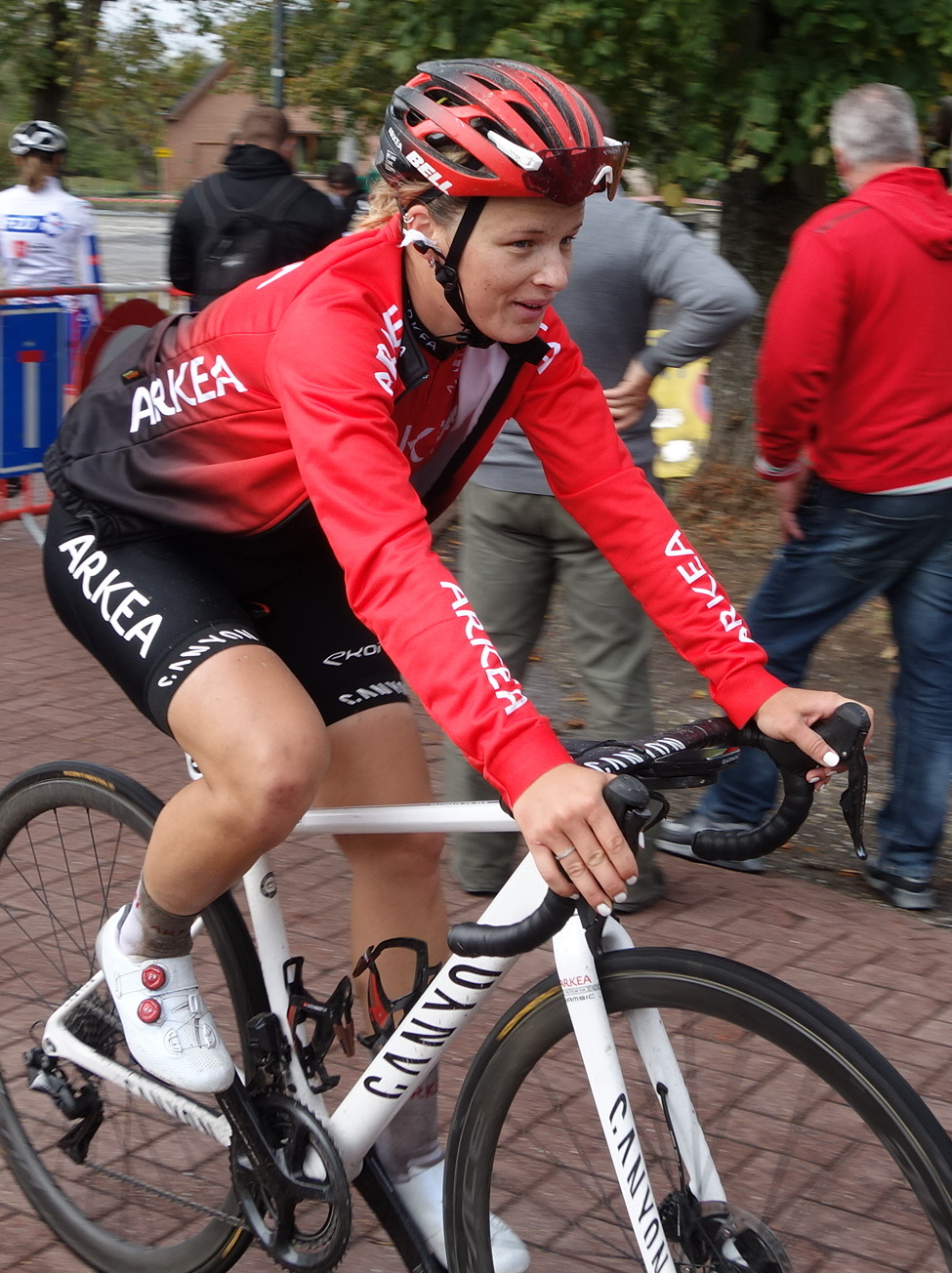
- Verhulst at the 2020 Flèche Wallonne

Personal information
- Full name: Gladys Verhulst
- Born: 2 January 1997 (age 29) Le Grand-Quevilly, Normandy, France
- Height: 1.64 m (5 ft 5 in)
- Weight: 58 kg (128 lb)

Cycling career
- Sport: Cycling
- Current team: AG Insurance–Soudal
- Discipline: Road
- Role: Rider
- Rider type: Puncheur; Sprinter

Amateur team
- 2017–2018: Léopard Normandie

Professional teams
- 2019: Charente-Maritime Women Cycling
- 2020–2021: Arkéa Pro Cycling Team
- 2022: Le Col–Wahoo
- 2023–2024: FDJ–Suez
- 2025–: AG Insurance–Soudal

Gladys Verhulst-Wild (born 2 January 1997) is a French professional racing cyclist, who rides for UCI Women's WorldTeam AG Insurance–Soudal. Verhulst previously rode with Charente-Maritime Women Cycling in 2019, after two years with the amateur Léopard Normandie team.

== Major results ==
2015
2nd Road race, National Junior Road Championships
10th Chrono des Nations Juniors
2018
National Road Championships

1st Under-23 road race
2nd Road race

5th Grand Prix International d'Isbergues
2019
1st La Picto-Charentaise
National Road Championships

2nd Road race

2020
National Road Championships

2nd Road race

4th Grand Prix International d'Isbergues
2021
1st Grand Prix Féminin de Chambéry
2nd GP de Plouay
National Road Championships

3rd Road race

4th Le Samyn
6th Overall Kreiz Breizh Elites Dames
7th Grote Prijs Beerens
7th Grand Prix International d'Isbergues
9th La Picto–Charentaise
2022
1st Veenendaal–Veenendaal Classic
National Road Championships

2nd Road race

4th Kreiz Breizh Elites Féminin
5th Classic Lorient Agglomération
Stage 1 Tour de France
2023
1st La Picto–Charentaise
2nd Overall Tour de Normandie Féminin

1st Points classification
1st Stage 1

7th Diamond Tour
2024
2nd Road race, National Road Championships
7th La Périgord Ladies
8th Grand Prix International d'Isbergues
10th Overall Tour de Normandie Féminin
2025
4th Le Samyn
