= 2021 Le Samyn des Dames =

Race details
- Dates: 2 March 2021
- Distance: 92.5 km (57.5 mi)
- Winning time: 2h 20' 04"

Results
	Winner	Lotte Kopecky (BEL)	(Liv Racing)
	Second	Emma Norsgaard (DEN)	(Movistar Team)
	Third	Chloe Hosking (AUS)	(Trek–Segafredo)

The 2021 Le Samyn des Dames was the 10th running of the women's Le Samyn, a women's bicycle race in Hainaut, Belgium. It was held on 2 March 2021 over a distance of 92.5 kilometres (57.5 miles) starting in Quaregnon and finishing in Dour. It was rated by the UCI as a 1.2 category race.

== Result ==
Result
Rank	Rider	Team	Time
1	Lotte Kopecky (BEL)	Liv Racing	2h 20' 04"
2	Emma Norsgaard (DEN)	Movistar Team	+ 0"
3	Chloe Hosking (AUS)	Trek–Segafredo	+ 0"
4	Gladys Verhulst (FRA)	Arkéa Pro Cycling Team	+ 0"
5	Marjolein van 't Geloof (NED)	Drops–Le Col	+ 0"
6	Amy Pieters (NED)	SD Worx	+ 0"
7	Laura Tomasi (ITA)	Alé BTC Ljubljana	+ 0"
8	Anna Henderson (GBR)	Team Jumbo–Visma	+ 0"
9	Amber van der Hulst (NED)	Parkhotel Valkenburg	+ 0"
10	Romy Kasper (GER)	Team Jumbo–Visma	+ 0"

== See also ==
- 2021 in women's road cycling
