= List of protected heritage sites in Quaregnon =

This table shows an overview of the protected heritage sites in the Walloon town Quaregnon. This list is part of Belgium's national heritage.

Object	Year/architect	Town/section	Address	Coordinates	Number^{?}	Image
Tower of the old church of Saint-Quentin, excluding the war memorial and the edges of the eighteenth century well ^{(nl)} ^{(fr)}		Quaregnon		50.443102°N 3.864713°E	53065-CLT-0002-01 Info	Toren van de oude kerk Saint-Quentin, met uitzondering van het oorlogsmonument en de rand van de put van de achttiende eeuw
The remains of the walls of the Catiau du Diable in Quaregnon, and ensemble of the hill with the retaining wall ^{(nl)} ^{(fr)}		Quaregnon		50.444846°N 3.863386°E	53065-CLT-0004-01 Info	De overblijfselen van de muren van de Catiau du Diable, in Quaregnon, en ensemble van de heuvel met de keermuur
The facades and roofs of the house Masse, rue Jules Destree 355 to Quaregnon, and the hall with stairs and doors in this hall ^{(nl)} ^{(fr)}		Quaregnon		50.443627°N 3.859009°E	53065-CLT-0006-01 Info	De gevels en daken van het huis Masse, rue Jules Destrée 355 te Quaregnon, en de hal met trapopgang en alle deuren in deze hal
Purple-colored beech tree, rue E. Anseele n ° 60 to Quaregnon ^{(nl)} ^{(fr)}		Quaregnon		50.441566°N 3.869267°E	53065-CLT-0008-01 Info	Purperkleurige beuk, rue E. Anseele n°60 te Quaregnon

== See also ==
- List of protected heritage sites in Hainaut (province)
- Quaregnon
