= 2014 Trofee Maarten Wynants =

Race details
- Dates: 17 May 2014
- Stages: 1
- Distance: 120 km (75 mi)
- Winning time: 2h 45' 30"

Results
	Winner	Maaike Polspoel (BEL)	(Team Giant–Shimano)
	Second	Amy Cure (AUS)	(Lotto–Intermarché Ladies)
	Third	Liesbet De Vocht (BEL)	(Lotto–Intermarché Ladies)

The 2014 Trofee Maarten Wynants was a one-day women's cycle race held in Belgium on 17 May 2014. The race had a UCI rating of 1.2.

== Results ==
	Rider	Team	Time
1	Maaike Polspoel (BEL)	Team Giant–Shimano	2h 45' 30"
2	Amy Cure (AUS)	Lotto–Intermarché Ladies	+ 1"
3	Liesbet De Vocht (BEL)	Lotto–Intermarché Ladies	+ 3"
4	Lotta Lepistö (FIN)	Bigla Cycling Team	+ 3"
5	Daniela Gass (GER)		+ 3"
6	Martina Zwick (GER)	Bigla Cycling Team	+ 3"
7	Hannah Walker (GBR)		+ 3"
8	Kaat Hannes (BEL)	Topsport Vlaanderen–Pro-Duo	+ 3"
9	Sofie De Vuyst (BEL)	Futurumshop.nl–Zannata	+ 3"
10	Jessie Daams (BEL)	Team SD Worx–Protime	+ 3"

== See also ==
- 2014 in women's road cycling
