= Marta Bastianelli =

Italian racing cyclist (born 1987)

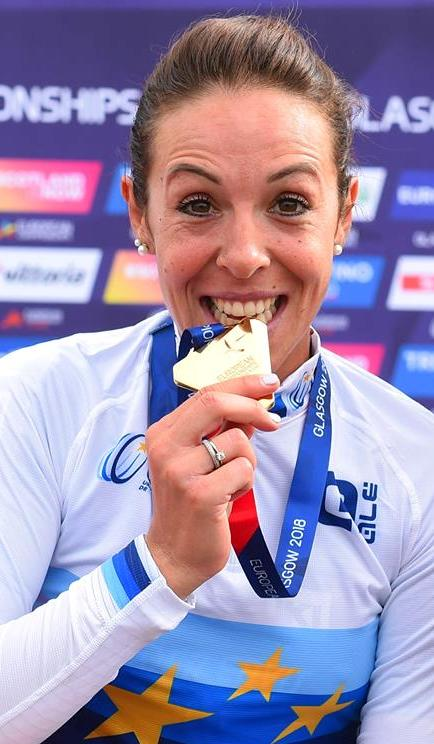
- Bastianelli with the gold medal won at the 2018 European Championships

Personal information
- Born: 30 April 1987 (age 39) Velletri, Italy

Cycling career
- Sport: Cycling
- Current team: Retired
- Disciplines: Road; Track
- Role: Rider
- Rider type: Sprinter

Amateur teams
- 2009: Gruppo Sportivo Fiamme Azzurre
- 2012: Gruppo Sportivo Fiamme Azzurre

Professional teams
- 2006–2008: Safi–Pasta Zara–Manhattan
- 2008: Team CMAX Dila
- 2009: Selle Italia Ghezzi
- 2011–2012: Mcipollini–Giordana
- 2013: Faren–Let's Go Finland
- 2015: Aromitalia Vaiano
- 2016–2018: Alé–Cipollini
- 2019: Team Virtu Cycling
- 2020–2023: Alé BTC Ljubljana

Major wins
- Major Tours Giro d'Italia 1 individual stage (2017) One-day races and Classics World Road Race Championships (2007) European Road Race Championships (2018) National Road Race Championships (2019) Tour of Flanders (2019) Gent–Wevelgem (2018) Brabantse Pijl (2018) Ronde van Drenthe (2019) Omloop van het Hageland (2016, 2019, 2022) Le Samyn (2023)
Medal record
Women's road bicycle racing
Representing Italy
UCI Road World Championships
Gold medal – first place	2007 Stuttgart	Women's road race
Silver medal – second place	2004 Verona	Junior women's road race
European Championships
Gold medal – first place	2018 Glasgow	Women's road race

Marta Bastianelli (born 30 April 1987) is an Italian former professional racing cyclist, who competed as a professional from 2006 to 2023. Bastianelli won the women's road race at the 2007 UCI Road World Championships ahead of Marianne Vos and Giorgia Bronzini, and also won the equivalent race at the 2018 European Road Cycling Championships, again beating Vos.

== Professional career ==
Born in Velletri, near Rome, Bastianelli rode for the Safi–Pasta Zara–Manhattan team from 2006 to 2008. On 5 July 2008, Bastianelli tested positive for a banned substance, the stimulant fenfluramine which can be found in dietary aids. It was found in her urine A sample during a routine doping control at the under 23 European championships held in Verbania, Italy. She was subsequently dropped from the Italian team for the 2008 Summer Olympics and handed a one-year ban by the Italian National Olympic Committee. Bastianelli appealed to the Court of Arbitration for Sport to overturn the ban, however the CAS instead extended her ban to two years after the Union Cycliste Internationale appealed, arguing that the initial ban was too lenient.

She competed at the 2020 Summer Olympics, in the road race.

== Personal life ==
Bastianelli is married and has a daughter, born in 2014.

== Major results ==
2004
2nd Road race, UCI Junior Road World Championships
2006
1st Young rider classification Thüringen Rundfahrt der Frauen
2007
1st Road race, UCI Road World Championships
2nd Road race, UEC Under-23 European Road Championships
3rd Durango-Durango Emakumeen Saria
3rd GP de Plouay – Bretagne
8th Overall Emakumeen Bira
8th Tour of Flanders for Women
8th Overall Tour de Pologne Féminin
2008
2nd La Flèche Wallonne Féminine
~~3rd Road race, UEC Under-23 European Road Championships~~
3rd Giro del Lago Maggiore
6th Road race, National Road Championships
8th Trofeo Alfredo Binda-Comune di Cittiglio
8th Tour of Flanders for Women
8th Tour de Berne
~~9th Overall Giro d'Italia Femminile~~
10th Overall Iurreta-Emakumeen Bira
2010
7th Overall Thüringen Rundfahrt der Frauen
2011
5th Ronde van Gelderland
2012
2nd Novilon Euregio Cup
3rd Road race, National Road Championships
2013
Tour Languedoc Roussillon

1st Points classification
1st Stage 2

5th Time trial, National Road Championships
Tour of Chongming Island

6th Overall Stage race
7th World Cup

2015
1st Stage 1 Giro della Toscana Int. Femminile – Memorial Michela Fanini
4th SwissEver GP Cham-Hagendorn
5th Time trial, National Road Championships
7th Sparkassen Giro
2016
1st Overall Giro della Campania in Rosa

1st Stages 1, 2 & 3

1st Omloop van het Hageland
1st Gran Premio della Liberazione
Trophée d'Or Féminin

1st Points classification
1st Stages 2 & 4

2nd Grand Prix de Dottignies
3rd Madrid Challenge by La Vuelta
5th Road race, UCI Road World Championships
5th Ronde van Drenthe
5th Women's Tour de Yorkshire
8th Overall Belgium Tour
2017
1st Gran Premio della Liberazione
1st Gran Premio Bruno Beghelli Internazionale Donne Elite
1st Stage 1 Emakumeen Euskal Bira
1st Stage 9 Giro d'Italia Femminile
4th Gent–Wevelgem
7th Crescent Vårgårda Road Race
9th Overall Setmana Ciclista Valenciana
2018
1st Road race, UEC European Road Championships
1st Gent–Wevelgem
1st Grand Prix de Dottignies
1st Brabantse Pijl Dames Gooik
1st Trofee Maarten Wynants
1st Gold Trophy in Euro-Women's Bike Race
1st Stage 3 BeNe Ladies Tour
1st Stage 1 Giro della Toscana Int. Femminile – Memorial Michela Fanini
2nd Gran Premio Bruno Beghelli Internazionale Donne Elite
4th Road race, National Road Championships
4th Women's WorldTour Ronde van Drenthe
10th Overall Setmana Ciclista Valenciana

1st Stage 2

2019
1st Road race, National Road Championships
1st Overall Gracia–Orlová

1st Points classification
1st Mountains classification
1st Active rider classification
1st Stages 1 & 3

1st Omloop van het Hageland
1st Ronde van Drenthe
1st Tour of Flanders for Women
1st Postnord UCI WWT Vårgårda West Sweden
1st Gran Premio Bruno Beghelli Internazionale Donne Elite
1st Stage 2 Thüringen Rundfahrt der Frauen
1st Stage 5 Tour Cycliste Féminin International de l'Ardèche
2nd Omloop Het Nieuwsblad
2nd Dwars door Vlaanderen for Women
3rd Drentse Acht van Westerveld
4th Strade Bianche Women
4th Gent–Wevelgem
7th Road race, UCI Road World Championships
7th Overall Ladies Tour of Norway
7th Three Days of Bruges–De Panne
8th Le Samyn des Dames
8th Amstel Gold Race
2020
1st Vuelta a la Comunitat Valenciana Feminas
2nd Omloop Het Nieuwsblad
2nd Omloop van het Hageland
4th GP de Plouay
7th Clasica Femenina Navarra
10th Strade Bianche Women
2021
1st La Périgord Ladies
1st Stage 2 Tour de Suisse féminin
1st Stage 5 Tour Cycliste Féminin International de l'Ardèche
1st Stage 1 The Women's Tour
2nd La Picto–Charentaise
5th Gent–Wevelgem
5th Paris–Roubaix
6th Omloop Het Nieuwsblad
8th Diamond Tour
9th Overall Holland Ladies Tour
9th Nokere Koerse
2022
1st Overall Grand Prix Elsy Jacobs

1st Points classification
1st Stage 1

1st Vuelta a la Comunitat Valenciana Feminas
1st Omloop van het Hageland
1st Stage 4 Setmana Ciclista Valenciana
Bretagne Ladies Tour

1st Points classification
1st Stages 1 & 2

3rd Nokere Koerse
3rd Classic Brugge–De Panne
5th Ronde van Drenthe
5th Dwars door Vlaanderen
6th Gent–Wevelgem
6th Overall RideLondon Classique
9th Omloop Het Nieuwsblad
10th Tour of Flanders
2023
1st Stage 1 Grand Prix Elsy Jacobs
1st Le Samyn des Dames
2nd Overall Grand Prix Elsy Jacobs
2nd Omloop van het Hageland
3rd Omloop Het Nieuwsblad
3rd Nokere Koerse
4th Diamond Tour
6th Gent–Wevelgem

=== Classics results timeline ===
Classic	2007	2008	2009	2010	2011	2012	2013	2014	2015	2016	2017	2018	2019	2020	2021	2022	2023
Omloop Het Nieuwsblad	—	—	—	—	—	—	11	—	—	29	51	—	2	2	6	9	3
Omloop van het Hageland	—	—	—	—	—	—	28	—	—	1	12	—	1	2	NH	1	2
Strade Bianche	Race did not exist								43	24	—	11	4	10	35	28	—
Ronde van Drenthe	DNF	—	—	—	33	71	21	—	—	5	—	4	1	NH	—	5	—
Classic Brugge–De Panne	Race did not exist											49	7	—	66	3	32
Gent–Wevelgem	Race did not exist					—	—	—	—	64	4	1	4	—	5	6	6
Trofeo Alfredo Binda-Comune di Cittiglio	24	8	—	—	69	—	DNF	—	45	55	—	13	—	NH	44	—	—
Tour of Flanders	8	8	—	—	76	DNF	76	—	70	74	37	13	1	—	44	10	43
Amstel Gold Race	Race did not exist										56	—	8	NH	35	—	—
La Flèche Wallonne	—	2	—	—	79	—	—	—	—	—	—	—	—	—	OTL	—	—
GP de Plouay – Bretagne	3	—	—	OTL	—	—	—	—	60	—	—	—	—	4	—	—	—
Paris–Roubaix	Race did not exist													NH	5	15	24

Legend
—	Did not compete
DNF	Did not finish
OTL	Outside time limit
NH	Not held

== See also ==
- List of doping cases in cycling
