= List of protected heritage sites in Dour =

This table shows an overview of the protected heritage sites in the Walloon town Dour. This list is part of Belgium's national heritage.

Object	Year/architect	Town/section	Address	Coordinates	Number^{?}	Image
Protestant temple ^{(nl)} ^{(fr)}		Dour	rue Albert Ier	50.398396°N 3.775169°E	53020-CLT-0001-01	
Church of Saint-Aubin ^{(nl)} ^{(fr)}		Dour		50.373406°N 3.804811°E	53020-CLT-0002-01	
Site of Cocars ^{(nl)} ^{(fr)}		Dour		50.391662°N 3.762098°E	53020-CLT-0004-01	Site des Cocars
House of the People ('du peuple'): facades, roofs and coffee room, place E. Vandervelde and rue du peuple ^{(nl)} ^{(fr)}		Dour		50.398961°N 3.786241°E	53020-CLT-0008-01	Huis van het Volk ('du peuple'): gevels, daken en koffiekamer, plaats E. Vandervelde en rue du peuple
House of the people of Wihéries: facades, roofs ^{(nl)} ^{(fr)}		Dour		50.386329°N 3.755918°E	53020-CLT-0009-01	Huis du peuple de Wihéries: gevels, daken
House of the people of Elouges: facades and roofs ^{(nl)} ^{(fr)}		Dour	rue du Stade 18, 20, 22 et 24	50.399833°N 3.750241°E	53020-CLT-0010-01	
Sauwarten of coal: chassis wheels or "belle fleur" and the slag heaps, except for the structures including the engine and funnels ^{(nl)} ^{(fr)}		Dour		50.392137°N 3.816190°E	53020-CLT-0011-01	Steenkolenmijn van Sauwarten: chassis van de wielen of "belle fleur" en de terrils, uitgezonderd de structuren inclusief de machinekamer en trechters
old Town Hall ^{(nl)} ^{(fr)}		Dour		50.373599°N 3.804464°E	53020-CLT-0012-01	Oud stadhuis
Gravestone Emmanuel Joseph Bouvez ^{(nl)} ^{(fr)}		Dour	Grand'Place	50.373608°N 3.804634°E	53020-CLT-0013-01	
Organ of the Church of Sainte-Vierge ^{(nl)} ^{(fr)}		Dour	Wihéries	50.385682°N 3.752194°E	53020-CLT-0014-01	

== See also ==
- List of protected heritage sites in Hainaut (province)
- Dour
