= Daniela Gass =

German cyclist (born 1980)

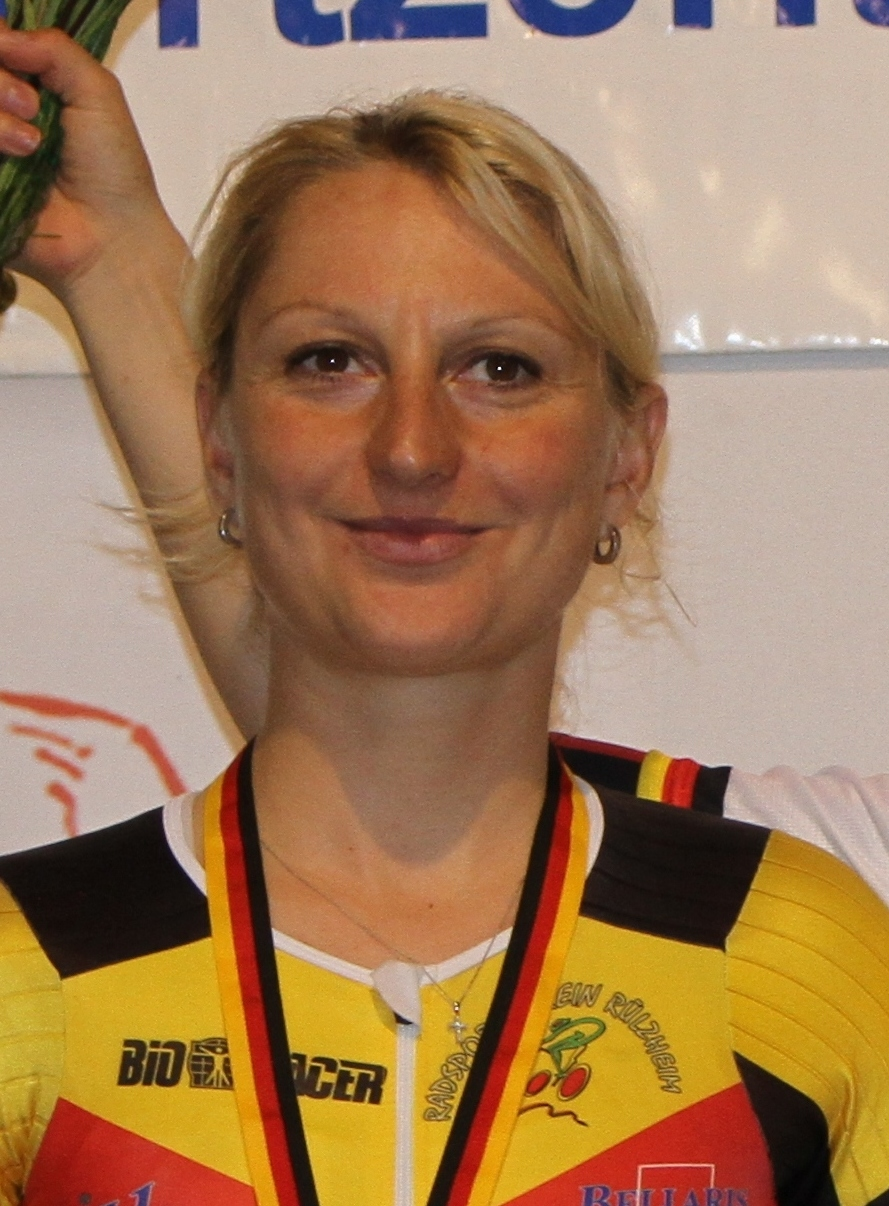
- Gass in 2016

Personal information
- Born: 5 November 1980 (age 45): Haßloch, West Germany; (now Germany)

Cycling career
- Sport: Cycling
- Discipline: Road
- Role: Rider

Amateur teams
- 2010: Bike Aid Road Team (guest)
- 2011: Bike-import.ch
- 2013: Napoleon Games St. Martinus (guest)
- 2013: Team Pratomagno Women (guest)
- 2014–2015: Autoglas Wetteren–Group Solar
- 2014: Team Velosport Pasta Montegrappa (guest)
- 2015: De Sprinters Malderen (guest)
- 2015: Parkhotel Valkenburg Continental Team (guest)
- 2015: Team Stuttgart (guest)
- 2016: De Sprinters Malderen
- 2016: Maaslandster Nicheliving CCN (guest)
- 2018: Maaslandster International
- 2018: Autoglas Wetteren–Group Solar (guest)
- 2019: Equano–Wase Zon

Professional teams
- 2012: Abus–Nutrixxion
- 2013: Squadra Scappatella
- 2017: Servetto Giusta

Daniela Gass (German: Daniela Gaß; born 5 November 1980) is a German racing cyclist.

== Major results ==
2011
4th Road race, National Road Championships
2013
4th Omloop van het Hageland
7th Classica Citta di Padova
7th Erondegemse Pijl
8th Sparkassen Giro Bochum
2014
5th Trofee Maarten Wynants
2015
6th Frauen Grand Prix Gippingen
2016
9th Trofee Maarten Wynants
10th Diamond Tour
2018
2nd Overall Panorama Guizhou International Women's Road Cycling Race
5th GP Sofie Goos
7th Omloop van de Westhoek - Memorial Stive Vermaut
8th Flanders Ladies Classic
9th Erondegemse Pijl
2019
2nd Le Samyn des Dames
5th MerXem Classic
6th Erondegemse Pijl
7th Trofee Maarten Wynants
7th Diamond Tour

== See also ==
- Squadra Scappatella
