= 2018 Gent–Wevelgem (women's race) =

2018 UCI Women's World Tour, race 5 of 24
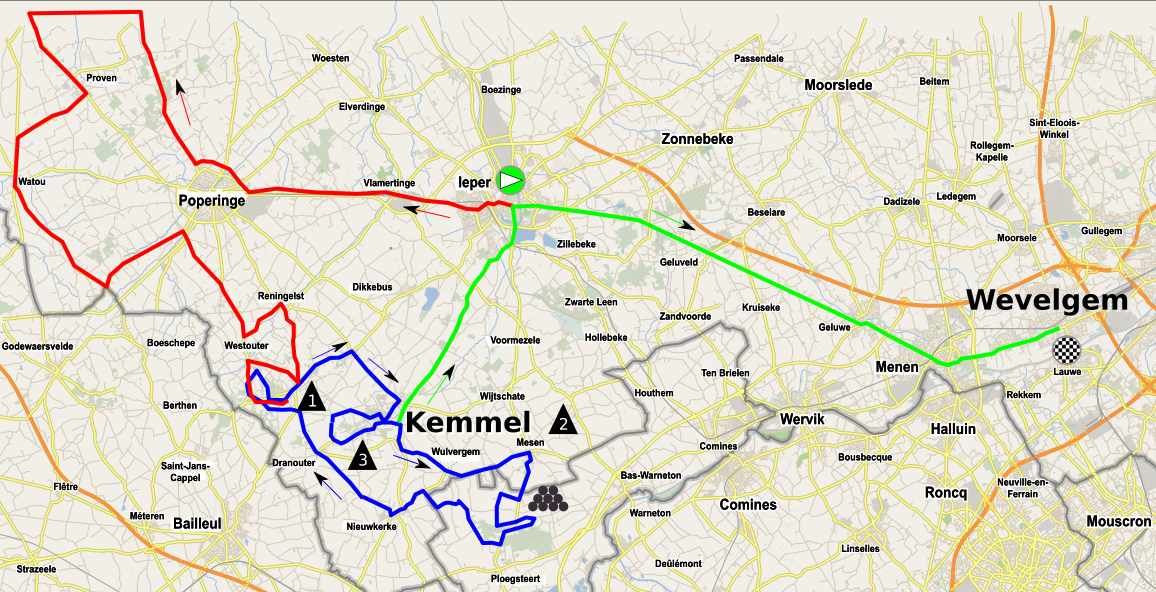

Race details
- Dates: 25 March 2018
- Stages: 1
- Distance: 142.6 km (88.6 mi)
- Winning time: 3h 41' 00"

Results
	Winner	Marta Bastianelli (ITA)	(Alé–Cipollini)
	Second	Jolien D'Hoore (BEL)	(Mitchelton–Scott)
	Third	Lisa Klein (GER)	(Canyon//SRAM)

The seventh running of Gent–Wevelgem's women's race (also known as Gent-Wevelgem In Flanders Fields) was a cycling event held in Belgium on Sunday 25 March 2018. It was the fifth leg of the 2018 UCI Women's World Tour. The race started in Ypres and finished in Wevelgem. Italian Marta Bastianelli won the race in a group sprint before Belgian Jolien D'Hoore and German Lisa Klein.

== Results ==
Final general classification

Rank	Rider	Team	Time
1	Marta Bastianelli (ITA)	Alé–Cipollini	3h 41' 00"
2	Jolien D'Hoore (BEL)	Mitchelton–Scott	s.t.
3	Lisa Klein (GER)	Canyon//SRAM	s.t.
4	Arlenis Sierra (CUB)	Astana	s.t.
5	Amy Pieters (NED)	Boels–Dolmans	s.t.
6	Hannah Barnes (GBR)	Canyon//SRAM	s.t.
7	Ashleigh Moolman (RSA)	Cervélo–Bigla Pro Cycling	s.t.
8	Floortje Mackaij (NED)	Team Sunweb	s.t.
9	Barbara Guarischi (ITA)	Team Virtu Cycling	s.t.
10	Letizia Paternoster (ITA)	Astana	s.t.

== See also ==
- 2018 in women's road cycling
