= Volta a la Comunitat Valenciana Fèmines =

Race details
- Date: February
- Discipline: Road
- Competition: UCI Women's ProSeries
- Type: One-day race
- Web site: vueltacv.com/en/vuelta-cv-feminas-2/

History
- First edition: 2019
- Editions: 8 (as of 2026)
- First winner: Lotte Kopecky (BEL)
- Most wins: Marta Bastianelli (ITA) (2)
- Most recent: Liane Lippert (GER)

The Volta a la Comunitat Valenciana Fèmines is a women's one-day road cycling race held in Spain. It is currently rated as a 1.Pro event.

== Winners ==
Year	Country	Rider	Team
2019	Belgium	Lotte Kopecky	Lotto–Soudal Ladies
2020	Italy	Marta Bastianelli	Alé BTC Ljubljana
2021	Italy	Chiara Consonni	Valcar–Travel & Service
2022	Italy	Marta Bastianelli	UAE Team ADQ
2023	Netherlands	Floortje Mackaij	Movistar Team
2024	France	Cédrine Kerbaol	Ceratizit–WNT Pro Cycling
2025	Switzerland	Linda Zanetti	Uno-X Mobility
2026	Germany	Liane Lippert	Movistar Team
