= 2016 Omloop van het Hageland =

Race details
- Dates: 28 February 2016
- Stages: 1
- Distance: 129.1 km (80.2 mi)
- Winning time: 3h 29' 08"

Results
	Winner	Marta Bastianelli (ITA)	(Alé–Cipollini)
	Second	Leah Kirchmann (CAN)	(Team Liv–Plantur)
	Third	Lotta Lepistö (FIN)	(Cervélo–Bigla Pro Cycling)

The 2016 Omloop van het Hageland was the 12th running of the women's Omloop van het Hageland, a women's bicycle race in Belgium. It was held on 28 February 2016, over a distance of 129.1 kilometres (80.2 miles) around Tielt-Winge. It was rated by the UCI as a 1.1 category race.

== Results ==
Result
Rank	Rider	Team	Time
1	Marta Bastianelli (ITA)	Alé–Cipollini	3h 29' 08"
2	Leah Kirchmann (CAN)	Team Liv–Plantur	s.t.
3	Lotta Lepistö (FIN)	Cervélo–Bigla Pro Cycling	s.t.
4	Shelley Olds (USA)	Cylance Pro Cycling	s.t.
5	Lucinda Brand (NED)	Rabobank-Liv Woman Cycling Team	s.t.
6	Annemiek van Vleuten (NED)	Orica–AIS	s.t.
7	Sarah Roy (AUS)	Orica–AIS	s.t.
8	Jip Van Den Bos (NED)	Parkhotel Valkenburg Continental Team	s.t.
9	Romy Kasper (GER)	Boels–Dolmans	s.t.
10	Tiffany Cromwell (AUS)	Canyon//SRAM	s.t.
