= Romy Kasper =

German cyclist (born 1988)

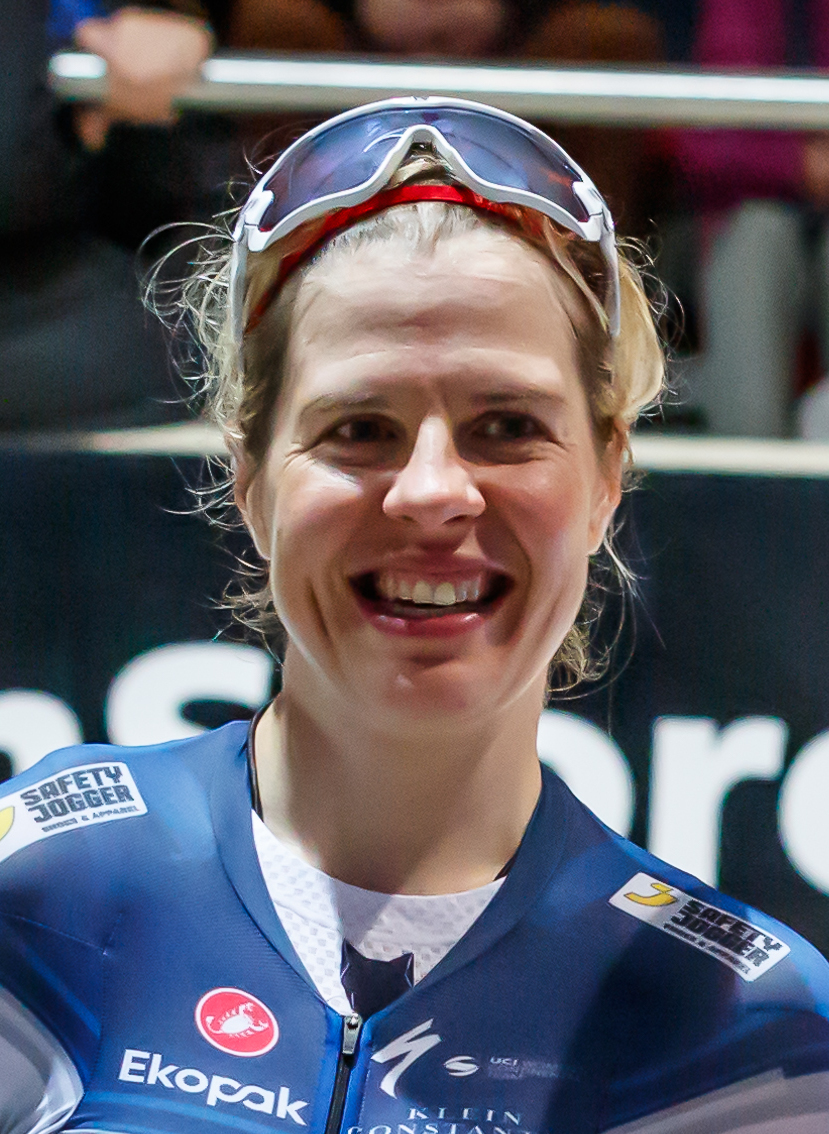
- Kasper in 2023

Personal information
- Full name: Romy Kasper
- Born: 5 May 1988 (age 38) Niedersachsen, West Germany
- Height: 173 cm (5 ft 8 in)
- Weight: 59 kg (130 lb)

Cycling career
- Sport: Cycling
- Current team: Human Powered Health
- Disciplines: Road; Track
- Role: Rider

Amateur teams
- 2008–2010: Team Cycling Noris
- 2011: Kuota Speed Kueens

Professional teams
- 2012: RusVelo
- 2013–2016: Boels–Dolmans
- 2017–2019: Alé–Cipollini
- 2020: Parkhotel Valkenburg
- 2021–2022: Team Jumbo–Visma
- 2023: AG Insurance–Soudal–Quick-Step
- 2024–: Human Powered Health
Medal record
Women's road cycling
Representing Germany
World University Cycling Championship
Gold medal – first place	2016 Tagaytay	Women's criterium
Gold medal – first place	2016 Tagaytay	Women's road race

Romy Kasper (born 5 May 1988) is a German racing cyclist, who currently rides for UCI Women's WorldTeam Human Powered Health. She competed in the 2013 UCI women's road race in Florence. She competed for Germany at the 2016 Summer Olympics in the women's road race where she finished in 44th place.

== Major results ==
2011
1st Stage 5 Tour de Feminin
4th The 26th Summer Universiade
7th Tour of Chongming Island World Cup
8th Overall Tour of Chongming Island
2012
3rd Overall Giro della Toscana
8th Ronde van Gelderland
9th Overall Energiewacht Tour
9th Overall Tour of Chongming Island
2013
3rd Road race, National Road Championships
2014
1st Stage 2 Thüringen Rundfahrt der Frauen
3rd Open de Suède Vårgårda (TTT)
7th Overall Auensteiner-Radsporttage
9th Ronde van Overijssel
2016
1st Stage 1 (TTT) Energiewacht Tour (with Ellen van Dijk, Amalie Dideriksen, Nikki Harris and Christine Majerus)
2nd Overall Ladies Tour of Qatar
9th Omloop van het Hageland
10th Gent-Wevelgem
10th Overall Energiewacht Tour
2017
4th Le Samyn des Dames
4th Road race, National Road Championships
7th Dwars Door Vlaanderen
2019
6th Le Samyn des Dames
9th Ronde van Drenthe
2021
10th Le Samyn des Dames
10th Dwars door de Westhoek
2023
3rd Road race, National Road Championships
6th Overall Bretagne Ladies Tour
10th Overall Thüringen Ladies Tour
