= Sofie van Rooijen =

Dutch cyclist (born 2002)

- Sofie van Rooijen in 2023

Personal information
- Born: 13 July 2002 (age 24) Driel, Netherlands

Cycling career
- Sport: Cycling
- Current team: UAE Team L'Imad
- Discipline: Road
- Role: Rider

Professional teams
- 2021–2024: Parkhotel Valkenburg
- 2025–: UAE Team ADQ
Medal record
Representing Netherlands
Women's track cycling
World Championships
Bronze medal – third place	2026 Shanghai	1 km time trial
European Championships
Bronze medal – third place	2026 Konya	Points race
Women's road bicycle racing
European Championships
Gold medal – first place	2024 Limburg	Under-23 road race

Sofie van Rooijen (born 13 July 2002) is a Dutch racing cyclist, who currently rides for UCI Women's WorldTeam UAE Team L'Imad. She previously rode for UCI Women's Continental Team VolkerWessels Women Cyclingteam. In 2024, she took four wins including the Omloop van Borsele and the Konvert Koerse.

== Major results ==
2019
2nd Road race, UEC European Junior Championships
2nd Road race, National Junior Championships
8th Overall Omloop van Borsele Junior
2022
2nd Omloop van Borsele
2nd Dwars door de Westhoek
2nd Omloop der Kempen
4th Diamond Tour
5th Districtenpijl - Ekeren-Deurne
2023
2nd La Choralis Fourmies Féminine
3rd Grote Prijs Beerens
2024
1st Road race, UEC European Under-23 Championships
1st Omloop van Borsele
1st Konvert Koerse
1st Drentse Acht van Westerveld
1st Grote Prijs Beerens
2nd Egmont Cycling Race
3rd GP Lucien Van Impe
4th Overall Tour of Chongming Island
5th Overall Princess Anna Vasa Tour

1st Young rider classification
1st Stage 2

4th Nokere Koerse
4th Scheldeprijs
4th Dwars door de Westhoek
7th Veenendaal–Veenendaal
2025
6th Trofeo Marratxi-Felanitx
10th Ronde de Mouscron
