= Grote Prijs Beerens =

Belgian one-day road cycling race

Race details
- Date: Early September
- Region: Aartselaar, Belgium
- Discipline: Road
- Web site: destervanaartselaar.be

History
- First edition: 2021
- Editions: 4 (as of 2024)
- First winner: Thalita de Jong (NED)
- Most wins: No repeat winners
- Most recent: Sofie van Rooijen (NED)

The Grote Prijs Beerens is an elite women's professional one-day road bicycle race held annually in Aartselaar, Belgium. The event was first held in 2021 is currently rated by the UCI as a 1.1 category race. The first edition was originally planned to take place in 2020 as a 1.2 category race, but was cancelled due to the COVID-19 pandemic.

== Past winners ==
Year	Country	Rider	Team
2021	Netherlands	Thalita de Jong	Bingoal Casino–Chevalmeire
2022	Netherlands	Marjolein van 't Geloof	Le Col–Wahoo
2023	Italy	Chiara Consonni	UAE Development Team
2024	Netherlands	Sofie van Rooijen	VolkerWessels Women Cyclingteam
