= Nel De Crits =

Belgian cyclist

Personal information
- Born: 9 April 1991 (age 35) Belgium

Cycling career
- Sport: Cycling
- Current team: Retired
- Discipline: Road
- Role: Rider

Professional team
- 2013–2016: Topsport Vlaanderen–Bioracer

Nel De Crits (born 9 April 1991) is a Belgian former racing cyclist, who rode professionally for Topsport Vlaanderen–Etixx–Guill D'or between 2013 and 2016. De Crits rode at the 2014 UCI Road World Championships, and she finished fifth in the 2015 Dwars door Vlaanderen.
