= Gerry Druyts =

Belgian cyclist

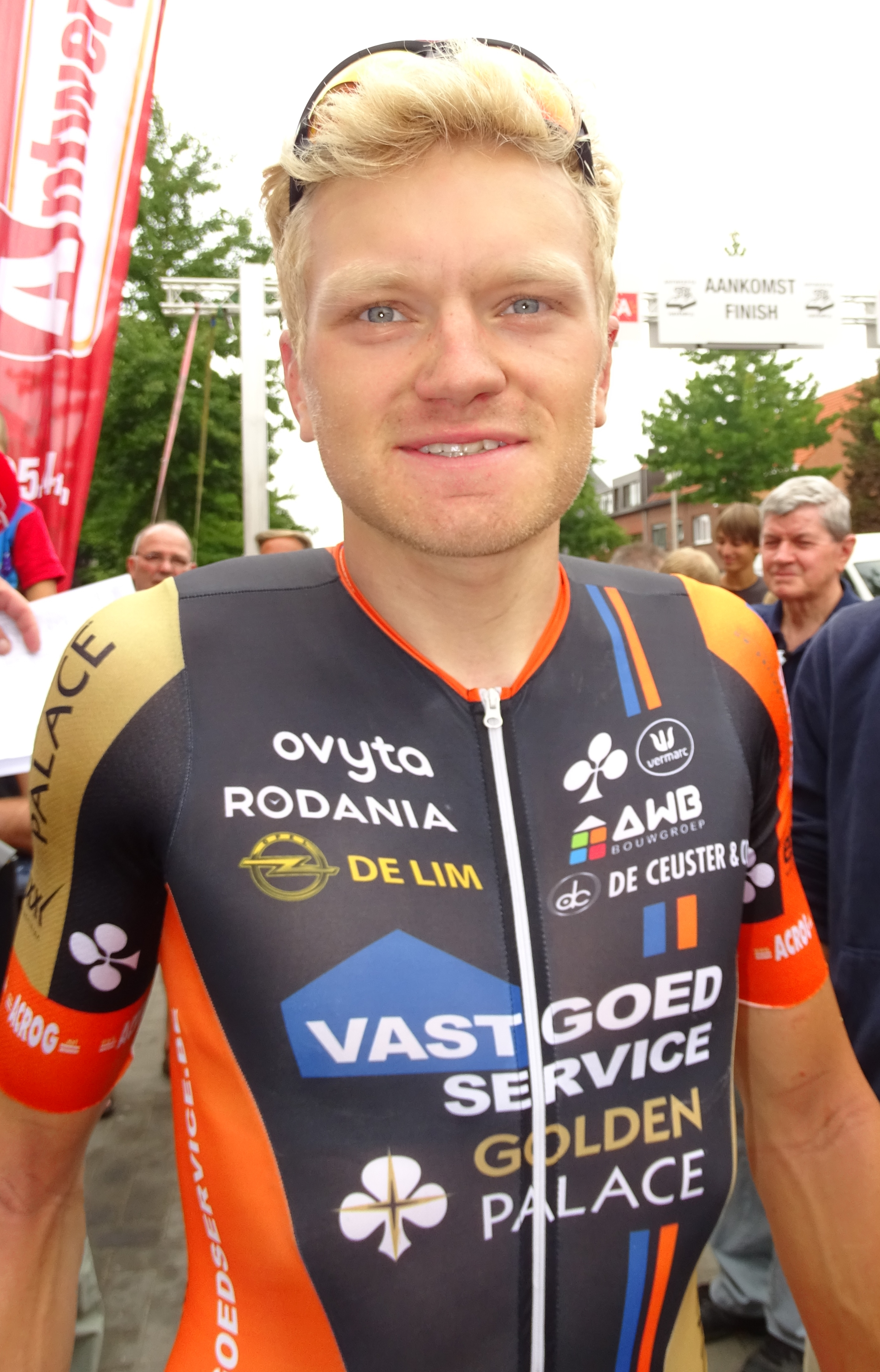
- Druyts in 2015

Personal information
- Born: 30 January 1991 (age 35) Wilrijk, Belgium
- Height: 1.77 m (5 ft 10 in)
- Weight: 69 kg (152 lb)

Cycling career
- Sport: Cycling
- Discipline: Road
- Role: Rider

Amateur teams
- 2007–2009: DCM–GB Vorselaar
- 2010–2011: Rock Werchter–Chocolade Jacques
- 2012–2013: EFC–Omega Pharma–Quick-Step
- 2018: Acrog–Pauwels Sauzen–Balen
- 2019–2020: Acrog–Pauwels Sauzen–Balen

Professional teams
- 2014: Team3M
- 2015–2017: Vastgoedservice–Golden Palace
- 2018: Pauwels Sauzen–Vastgoedservice

Gerry Druyts (born 30 January 1991 in Wilrijk) is a Belgian cyclist.

Druyts is from a sporting family: his father, Ronny, played youth football with Beerschot A.C. and at the senior level with Dynamo Niel, where he was a champion in the Belgian Provincial Leagues, his sister Steffy was a multiple national champion in gymnastics, and he is the brother of racing cyclists Jessy Druyts, Demmy Druyts, Lenny Druyts and Kelly Druyts. Gerry was a national champion in triathlon and duathlon at youth level before focussing on cycling.

== Major results ==
2012
7th Memorial Van Coningsloo
2013
4th Ronde Pévéloise
7th Grand Prix des Marbriers
10th Liège–Bastogne–Liège U23
2014
2nd Dwars door de Vlaamse Ardennen
7th Paris–Camembert
10th Kattekoers
2015
3rd Antwerpse Havenpijl
6th Kattekoers
2016
5th Ronde van Drenthe
7th Nokere Koerse
2018
2nd Dwars door de Vlaamse Ardennen
10th Heistse Pijl
