= Brisbane Continental Cycling Team =

Team information
- UCI code: BRI
- Registered: Australia
- Founded: 2018
- Disbanded: 2018
- Discipline: Road
- Status: UCI Continental (2018–)

Team name history
- 2018: Brisbane Continental Cycling Team

Brisbane Continental Cycling Team was an Australian UCI Continental team founded in 2018 and disbanded at the end of the same year.

== Major results ==
2018
Stage 5 New Zealand Cycle Classic, Jordan Kerby

== Team roster ==
| Rider | Date of birth |
|---|---|
| Joshua Beikoff (AUS) | 21 August 1998 (age 28) |
| Jonathan Butler (AUS) | 28 September 1994 (age 31) |
| David Edwards (AUS) | 21 April 1993 (age 33) |
| Jordan Kerby (AUS) | 15 August 1992 (age 34) |
| Oliver Martin (AUS) | 23 June 1995 (age 31) |
| Mitch Neumann (AUS) | 8 November 1993 (age 32) |

| Rider | Date of birth |
|---|---|
| Jonathon Noble (AUS) | 7 September 1996 (age 29) |
| Thomas Robinson (AUS) | 30 November 1989 (age 36) |
| Oliver Smith (AUS) | 1996 |
| Ryan Thomas (AUS) | 2 February 1995 (age 31) |
| Michael Vink (NZL) | 22 November 1991 (age 34) |
| Calan White (AUS) | 2 April 1999 (age 27) |
