= Lenny Druyts =

Belgian cyclist

Personal information
- Born: 18 May 1997 (age 29) Wilrijk, Belgium

Cycling career
- Sport: Cycling
- Discipline: Road
- Role: Rider

Professional teams
- 2016–2018: Topsport Vlaanderen–Etixx–Guill D'or
- 2019: Doltcini–Van Eyck Sport
- 2020–2022: Chevalmeire Cycling Team

Lenny Druyts (born 18 May 1997) is a Belgian professional racing cyclist, who most recently rode for UCI Women's Continental Team Chevalmeire. As a junior rider, she competed in the women's junior road race at the 2014 UCI Road World Championships and 2015 UCI Road World Championships.

Her sisters Jessy Druyts, Demmy Druyts, and Kelly Druyts, as well as her brother Gerry Druyts, are all professional cyclists.

== Major results ==
2014
National Junior Road Championships

1st Road race
2nd Time trial

2015
National Junior Road Championships

1st Road race
1st Time trial

7th Road race UEC European Junior Road Championships
2016
3rd Team pursuit, Grand Prix of Poland (with Nathalie Bex, Lotte Kopecky and Kaat Van der Meulen)

== See also ==
- List of 2016 UCI Women's Teams and riders
