= Kermesse (cycling) =

Road bicycle race that is common in Western Europe

A kermesse, also spelled kermess, and kermis in Dutch is a style of road bicycle race that is common in Western Europe. Typically kermesse races are found in Belgium, especially in the northern Flanders region, where they are the most popular style of amateur bicycle race. They also exist in the Netherlands. The bicycle race borrows the name from the kermesse festival where the bicycle race is often held on the same day as a town festival, though not always.

These amateur races are usually 90 to 140 kilometers in length. While some are longer or shorter, most are about 120 kilometers. The race is a set distance and number of laps over the established course. There are typically 10 to 20 laps, of between 5 and 10 kilometers. There are also professional races, which are longer, 150 to 180 km, with a circuit length of not less than 10 km. The race usually begins and ends in the center of the town which is hosting the day's race. The race will occupy the roads in town as well as the roads surrounding, either city streets or farmland.

The course usually has a rolling enclosure. This means that while the race is not passing through, the streets are open to traffic. A designated car, usually with a caution sign and a red flag, leads the riders and close the cross streets to traffic. A following car, usually with signs and a green flag, open the streets back up to traffic.

These events are usually amateur races (professionals are not allowed) and classified as UCI 1.12B, though there are also professional only races. To enter the race one must hold a license with a governing cycling body of their country or with the Union Cycliste Internationale. Most kermesse races in Belgium are overseen by Wielerbond Vlaanderen. Registration for the races is typically 3 euro with a 5-euro deposit for the race number. The race number must be returned after the race to get one's deposit back.

There is usually a pay out of 670 euro or 800 euro. Traditionally the 670 euro race will pay out 35 deep and the 800 euro race will pay out 50 deep. Some races have greater or less payout. Within the event there are often special prizes awarded during certain laps of the race, known as primes. The primes are usually cash awards, but sometimes will be other things like a bicycle.

The kermesse is similar to the criterium but differs in having a longer course length and longer lap length. While a criterium traditionally lasts 60–90 minutes, a kermesse will often take 120–180 minutes. A single lap in a criterium is usually less than 5 kilometers while the kermesse is usually 5-10 kilometers per lap.
