= Demmy Druyts =

Belgian cyclist

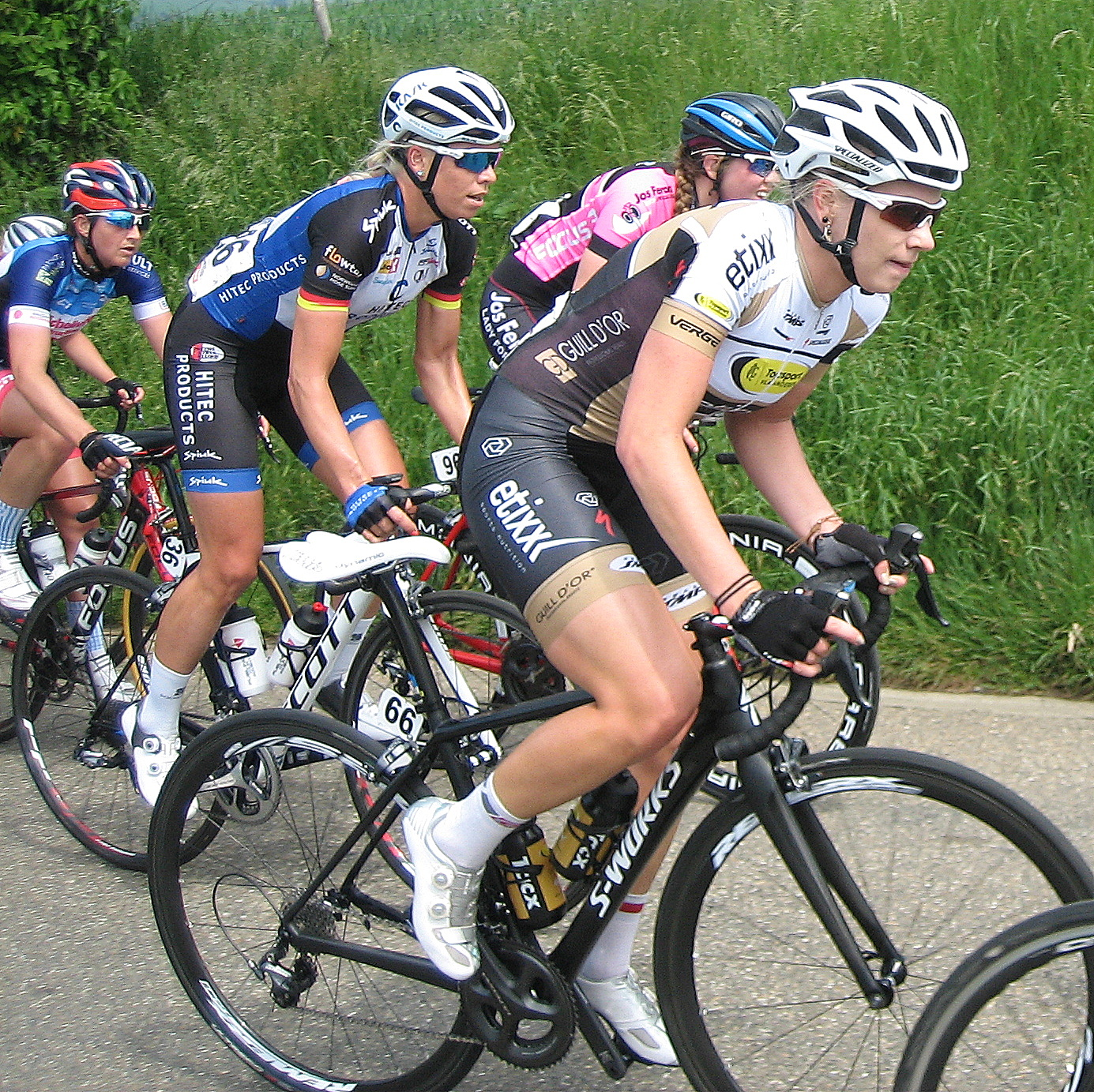
- Druyts in 2016

Personal information
- Full name: Demmy Druyts
- Born: 4 October 1995 (age 31) Wilrijk, Belgium

Cycling career
- Sport: Cycling
- Discipline: Road
- Role: Rider

Professional teams
- 2014–2017: Topsport Vlaanderen–Pro-Duo
- 2018–2019: Doltcini–Van Eyck Sport
- 2020–2021: Chevalmeire Cycling Team

Demmy Druyts (born 4 October 1995) is a Belgian racing cyclist, who most recently rode for UCI Women's Continental Team Chevalmeire. She rode at the 2014 UCI Road World Championships.

Druyts is from a sporting family: her father, Ronny, played youth football with Beerschot AC and at the senior level with Dynamo Niel, where he was a champion in the Belgian Provincial leagues, her sister Steffy was a multiple national champion in gymnastics, and she is the sister of racing cyclists Jessy Druyts, Kelly Druyts, Lenny Druyts and Gerry Druyts.
