= Gran Premio Bruno Beghelli Internazionale Donne Elite =

Race details
- Date: October
- Region: Italy
- Discipline: Road
- Type: One-day race
- Web site: www.gsemilia.it/a33_gp-bruno-beghelli.html

History
- First edition: 2016
- Editions: 4
- Final edition: 2019
- First winner: Chloe Hosking (AUS)
- Most wins: Marta Bastianelli (ITA) (2 wins)
- Final winner: Marta Bastianelli (ITA)

The Gran Premio Bruno Beghelli Internazionale Donne Elite is a women's one-day cycle race which starts and finishes in Monteveglio in Italy. It is currently rated by the UCI as category 1.1. The race was cancelled in 2020 and 2021, and has not been held since.

== Overall winners ==
Year	Country	Rider	Team
2016	Australia	Chloe Hosking	Wiggle High5
2017	Italy	Marta Bastianelli	Alé–Cipollini
2018	Italy	Elisa Balsamo	Valcar–PBM
2019	Italy	Marta Bastianelli	Italy (national team)
