= Konvert Koerse =

Belgian one-day road cycling race

Race details
- Date: August
- Region: Kortrijk, Belgium
- Discipline: Road
- Web site: www.kortrijkkoerse.be

History
- First edition: 2022
- Editions: 3 (as of 2024)
- First winner: Julie De Wilde (BEL)
- Most wins: No repeat winners
- Most recent: Sofie van Rooijen (NED)

The Konvert Koerse, also known as the Konvert Kortrijk Koerse, is an elite women's professional one-day road bicycle race held annually in Kortrijk, Belgium. The event was first held in 2022 is currently rated by the UCI as a 1.1 category race.

A men's edition of the race known as the Kortrijk Koerse was held until 2019.

== Past winners ==
Year	Country	Rider	Team
2022	Belgium	Julie De Wilde	Plantur–Pura
2023	Poland	Daria Pikulik	Human Powered Health
2024	Netherlands	Sofie van Rooijen	VolkerWessels Women Cyclingteam
