= Jessy Druyts =

Belgian cyclist

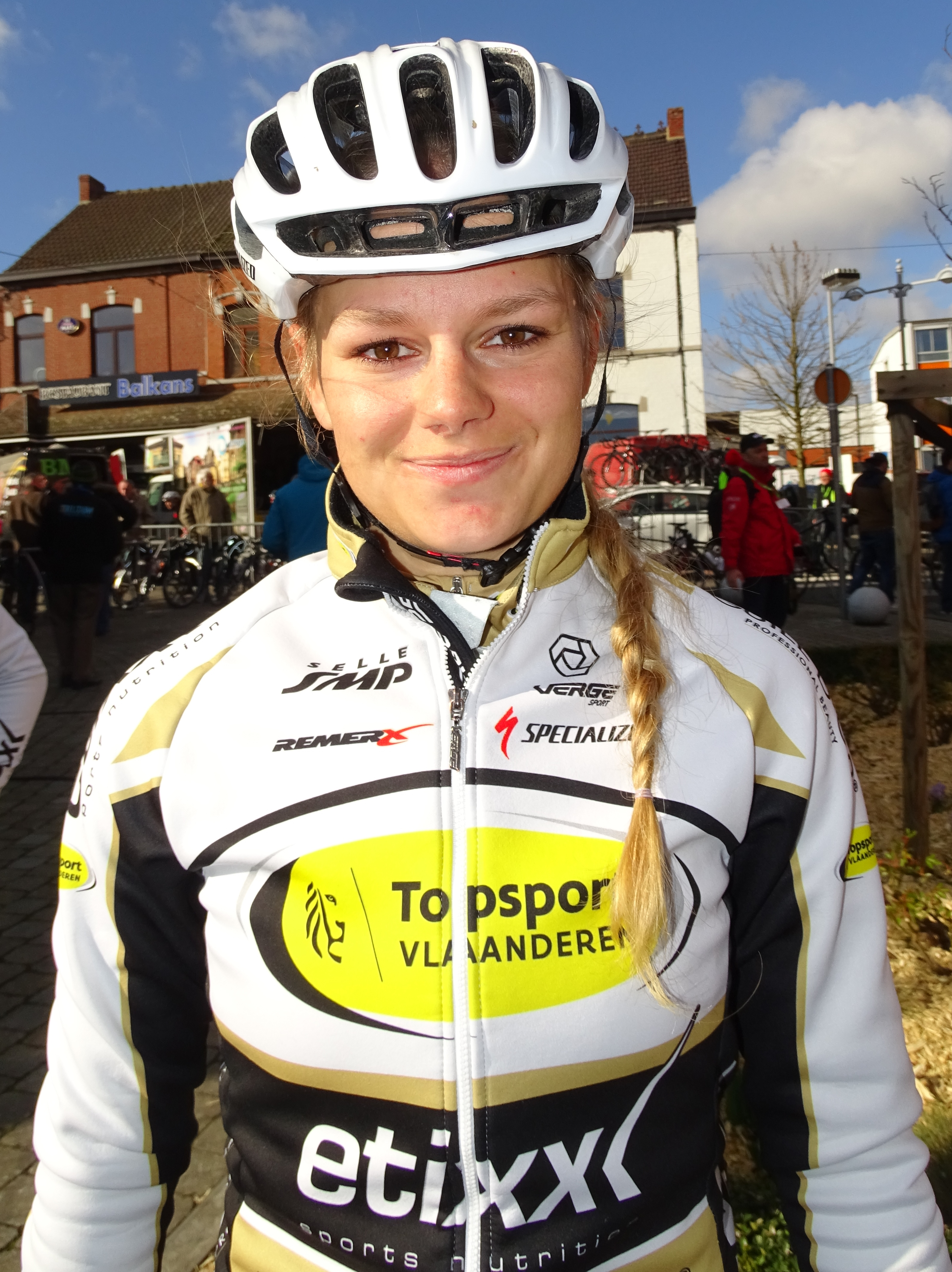
- Druyts in 2016

Personal information
- Full name: Jessy Druyts
- Born: 22 January 1994 (age 32)

Cycling career
- Sport: Cycling
- Discipline: Road
- Role: Rider

Amateur team
- 2019: Rogelli–Gyproc–APB

Professional teams
- 2012–2018: Topsport Vlaanderen–Ridley
- 2020: Multum Accountants–LSK Ladies

Jessy Druyts (born 22 January 1994) is a Belgian professional racing cyclist, who most recently rode for UCI Women's Continental Team Multum Accountants–LSK Ladies.

Druyts is from a sporting family: her father, Ronny, played youth football with Beerschot AC and at the senior level with Dynamo Niel, where he was a champion in the Belgian Provincial leagues, her sister Steffy was a multiple national champion in gymnastics, and she is the sister of racing cyclists Kelly Druyts, Demmy Druyts, Lenny Druyts and Gerry Druyts.

== See also ==
- List of 2015 UCI Women's Teams and riders
