= La Picto–Charentaise =

Bicycle race in France

Race details
- Date: August
- Region: France
- Discipline: Road
- Web site: www.la-picto-charentaise-feminine.fr

History
- First edition: 2019
- Editions: 5 (as of 2024)
- First winner: Gladys Verhulst (FRA)
- Most recent: Sheyla Gutiérrez (ESP)

La Picto–Charentaise is an elite women's professional one-day road bicycle race held in France and is currently rated by the UCI as a 1.2 race.

== Past winners ==
Year	Country	Rider	Team
2019	France	Gladys Verhulst	Charente–Maritime Women Cycling
2020			
2021	Poland	Marta Lach	Ceratizit–WNT Pro Cycling
2022	France	Marie Le Net	Arkéa–Samsic
2023	France	Gladys Verhulst	Arkéa–Samsic
2024	Spain	Sheyla Gutiérrez	Movistar Team
