= Le Samyn =

Belgian one-day road cycling race

Race details
- Date: February/March
- Region: Hainaut, Belgium
- Local name(s): Le Samyn des Hommes (men); Le Samyn des Dames (women) (in French)
- Nickname: Le Samyn
- Discipline: Road
- Competition: Men: UCI Europe Tour; Women: Lotto Cycling Cup
- Type: Single-day
- Web site: www.lesamyn.be

Men's history
- First edition: 1968
- Editions: 58 (as of 2026)
- First winner: José Samyn (FRA)
- Most wins: Johan Capiot (BEL) (3 wins)
- Most recent: Jordi Meeus (BEL)

Women's history
- First edition: 2012
- Editions: 15 (as of 2026)
- First winner: Adrie Visser (NED)
- Most wins: Chantal Blaak (NED) (3 wins)
- Most recent: Lara Gillespie (IRL)

Le Samyn is an annual single-day road bicycle race in Belgium, held usually in late February or early March. The event was first held in 1968 as a men's race. Since 2012, there has been men's edition (Le Samyn des Hommes) and a women's edition (Le Samyn des Dames). It is named after José Samyn, the race's first winner, who died in 1969.

Johan Capiot holds the men's record and Chantal van den Broek-Blaak holds the women's record for most victories, each with three.

== History ==
The first edition of the race, called the Grand Prix de Fayt-le-Franc, was held in 1968 and won by Frenchman José Samyn. Samyn died in a race accident the next year, and the race was renamed Grand Prix José Samyn as a tribute. The race is more commonly referred to as simply Le Samyn or Memorial Samyn. As of 2025, the race is officially called Ename Samyn Classic for sponsorship purposes.

Since 2005, the race is included in the UCI Europe Tour as a 1.1 event. It is the first race of the season in Wallonia, held on the Tuesday after its Flemish counterpart, Omloop Het Nieuwsblad. The race is run entirely in the province of Hainaut, starting in Quaregnon and finishing in Dour. During the course, 16 sectors of cobbled roads are traversed, prompting Belgian media to call it The Little Paris–Roubaix.

The 2005 edition was cancelled because snow had made the roads too dangerous. Since 2012, a women's edition of the race, named Le Samyn des Dames, has been held on the same day as the men's race. However, for 2026 there is a confirmed schedule change: the women’s race is being held the day before the men’s race (on Monday, 2 March 2026, with the men’s on Tuesday, 3 March 2026).

== Winners ==
=== Men's race ===
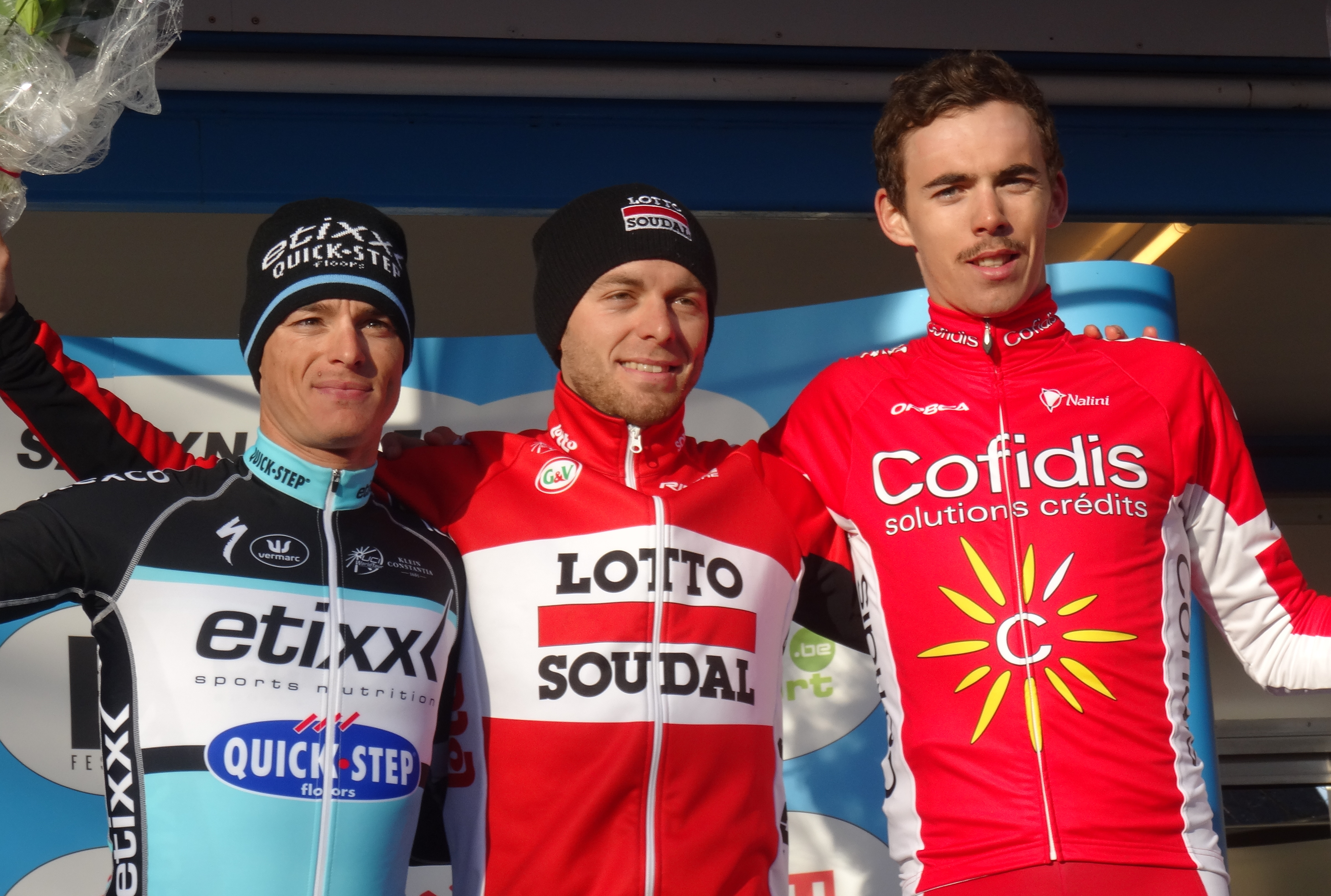
Le Samyn 2015 : Gianni Meersman (2), Kris Boeckmans (1) & Christophe Laporte (3).

Year	Country	Rider	Team
1968	France	José Samyn	Pelforth–Sauvage–Lejeune
1969	Belgium	Herman Vrijders	Faema
1970	Belgium	Ronny Van de Vijver	Flandria–Mars
1971	Belgium	Julien Van Lint	Molteni
1972	Belgium	Marc Demeyer	Beaulieu–Flandria
1973	Belgium	Louis Verreydt	IJsboerke–Bertin
1974	Belgium	André Dierickx	Merlin Plage–Flandria
1975	France	Alain Santy	Gitane–Campagnolo
1976	Belgium	Dirk Baert	Carlos
1977	France	Michel Périn	Gitane–Campagnolo
1978	Belgium	Herman Van Springel	Marc Zeepcentrale–Superia
1979	Netherlands	Adri Schipper	Marc Zeepcentrale–Superia
1980	Belgium	Gery Verlinden	IJsboerke–Warncke Eis
1981	Belgium	Pol Verschuere	Capri Sonne
1982	Belgium	Jos Jacobs	Vermeer Thijs
1983	Netherlands	Jacques Van Meer	Fangio–Tönissteiner
1984	Belgium	Daniel Rossel	Tönissteiner–Lotto
1985	Belgium	Ronny Van Holen	Safir–Van de Ven
1986	Belgium	Patrick Onnockx	Lotto–Emerxil–Merckx
1987	Belgium	Claude Criquielion	Hitachi–Marc
1988	No race		
1989	Belgium	Hendrik Redant	Lotto
1990	Belgium	Hendrik Redant	Lotto–Superclub
1991	Belgium	Johnny Dauwe	Tulip Computers
1992	Belgium	Johan Capiot	TVM–Sanyo
1993	Belgium	Wilfried Nelissen	Novemail–Histor–Laser Computer
1994	Belgium	Johan Capiot	TVM–Bison Kit
1995	Belgium	Johan Capiot	Refin
1996	Belgium	Hans De Meester	Palmans
1997	Belgium	Michel Van Haecke	Ipso–Euroclean
1998	France	Ludovic Auger	BigMat–Auber 93
1999	Belgium	Thierry Marichal	Lotto–Mobistar
2000	Denmark	Frank Høj	Française des Jeux
2001	Belgium	Kris Gerits	Vlaanderen T-Interim
2002	Sweden	Magnus Bäckstedt	EDS–Fakta
2003	Netherlands	Stefan van Dijk	Lotto–Domo
2004	Australia	Robbie McEwen	Lotto–Domo
2005	No race		
2006	France	Renaud Dion	AG2R Prévoyance
2007	France	Jimmy Casper	Unibet.com
2008	Belgium	Philippe Gilbert	Française des Jeux
2009	Belgium	Wouter Weylandt	Quick-Step
2010	Belgium	Jens Keukeleire	Cofidis
2011	Germany	Dominic Klemme	Leopard Trek
2012	France	Arnaud Démare	FDJ–BigMat
2013	Russia	Alexey Tsatevich	Team Katusha
2014	Belgium	Maxime Vantomme	Roubaix–Lille Métropole
2015	Belgium	Kris Boeckmans	Lotto–Soudal
2016	Netherlands	Niki Terpstra	Etixx–Quick-Step
2017	Belgium	Guillaume Van Keirsbulck	Wanty–Groupe Gobert
2018	Netherlands	Niki Terpstra	Quick-Step Floors
2019	France	Florian Sénéchal	Deceuninck–Quick-Step
2020	France	Hugo Hofstetter	Israel Start-Up Nation
2021	Belgium	Tim Merlier	Alpecin–Fenix
2022	Italy	Matteo Trentin	UAE Team Emirates
2023	Belgium	Milan Menten	Lotto–Dstny
2024	Belgium	Laurenz Rex	Intermarché–Wanty
2025	Netherlands	Mathieu van der Poel	Alpecin–Deceuninck
2026	Belgium	Jordi Meeus	Red Bull–Bora–Hansgrohe

=== Multiple winners ===
Wins	Rider	Country	Years
3	Johan Capiot	Belgium	1992, 1994, 1995
2	Hendrik Redant	Belgium	1989, 1990
2	Niki Terpstra	Netherlands	2016, 2018

=== Wins by country ===
Wins	Country
36	Belgium
9	France
6	Netherlands
1	Australia, Denmark, Germany, Italy, Russia, Sweden

=== Women's race ===
Year	Country	Rider	Team
2012	Netherlands	Adrie Visser	Skil 1t4i
2013	Netherlands	Ellen van Dijk	Specialized–lululemon
2014	Sweden	Emma Johansson	Orica–AIS
2015	Netherlands	Chantal Blaak	Boels–Dolmans
2016	Netherlands	Chantal Blaak	Boels–Dolmans
2017	Spain	Sheyla Gutiérrez	Cylance Pro Cycling
2018	Netherlands	Janneke Ensing	Alé–Cipollini
2019	Netherlands	Jip van den Bos	Boels–Dolmans
2020	Netherlands	Chantal van den Broek-Blaak	Boels–Dolmans
2021	Belgium	Lotte Kopecky	Liv Racing
2022	Denmark	Emma Norsgaard	Movistar Team
2023	Italy	Marta Bastianelli	UAE Team ADQ
2024	Italy	Vittoria Guazzini	FDJ–Suez
2025	Netherlands	Lorena Wiebes	Team SD Worx–Protime
2026	Ireland	Lara Gillespie	UAE Team Emirates XRG

=== Multiple winners ===
Wins	Rider	Country	Years
3	Chantal van den Broek-Blaak	Netherlands	2015, 2016, 2020

=== Wins by country ===
Wins	Country
8	Netherlands
2	Italy
1	Belgium, Denmark, Spain, Sweden, Ireland
