= Trofee Maarten Wynants =

Belgian cycling race

Race details
- Date: May
- Region: Belgium
- Discipline: Road
- Competition: Men: Kermesse; Women: 1.2 (2014–2016); 1.1 (2017–present)
- Type: One-day race
- Web site: www.prochallengehelchteren.be

History (men)
- Most wins: No repeat winners
- Most recent: Jarne Van Dyck (BEL)

History (women)
- First edition: 2014
- Editions: 9 (as of 2024)
- First winner: Maaike Polspoel (BEL)
- Most wins: No repeat winners
- Most recent: Anniina Ahtosalo (FIN)

The Trofee Maarten Wynants is a one-day cycle race which takes place in Belgium. The women's race was rated by the UCI as category 1.1 until 2019, while the men's race is a domestic kermesse.

== Winners ==
=== Men's race ===
Year	Country	Rider	Team
2011	Belgium	Niko Eeckhout	An Post–Sean Kelly
2012	Belgium	Jelle Wallays	Topsport Vlaanderen–Mercator
2013	Belgium	Wout Franssen	An Post–Chain Reaction
2014	Belgium	Benjamin Verraes	Josan–To Win
2015	Belgium	Kevin Peeters	Vastgoedservice–Golden Palace
2016	Belgium	Joachim Vanreyten	Lotto–Soudal U23
2017	Belgium	Jérôme Baugnies	Wanty–Groupe Gobert
2018	Belgium	Jasper Philipsen	Hagens Berman Axeon
2019	Netherlands	Taco van der Hoorn	Team Jumbo–Visma
2020	No race due to the COVID-19 pandemic in Belgium		
2021	Belgium	Jarne Van Dyck	Crabbé–CC Chevigny

=== Women's race ===
Year	Country	Rider	Team
2014	Belgium	Maaike Polspoel	Belgium (national team)
2015	Netherlands	Natalie van Gogh	Parkhotel Valkenburg Continental Team
2016	Belgium	Lotte Kopecky	Lotto–Soudal Ladies
2017	Netherlands	Marianne Vos	WM3 Energie
2018	Italy	Marta Bastianelli	Alé–Cipollini
2019	Italy	Elisa Balsamo	Valcar–Cylance
2020– 2021	No race due to the COVID-19 pandemic in Belgium		
2022	Netherlands	Scarlett Souren	WV Schijndel
2023	Italy	Chiara Consonni	UAE Team ADQ
2024	Finland	Anniina Ahtosalo	Uno-X Mobility
