= Experza–Footlogix Ladies Cycling Team =

Belgian cycling team

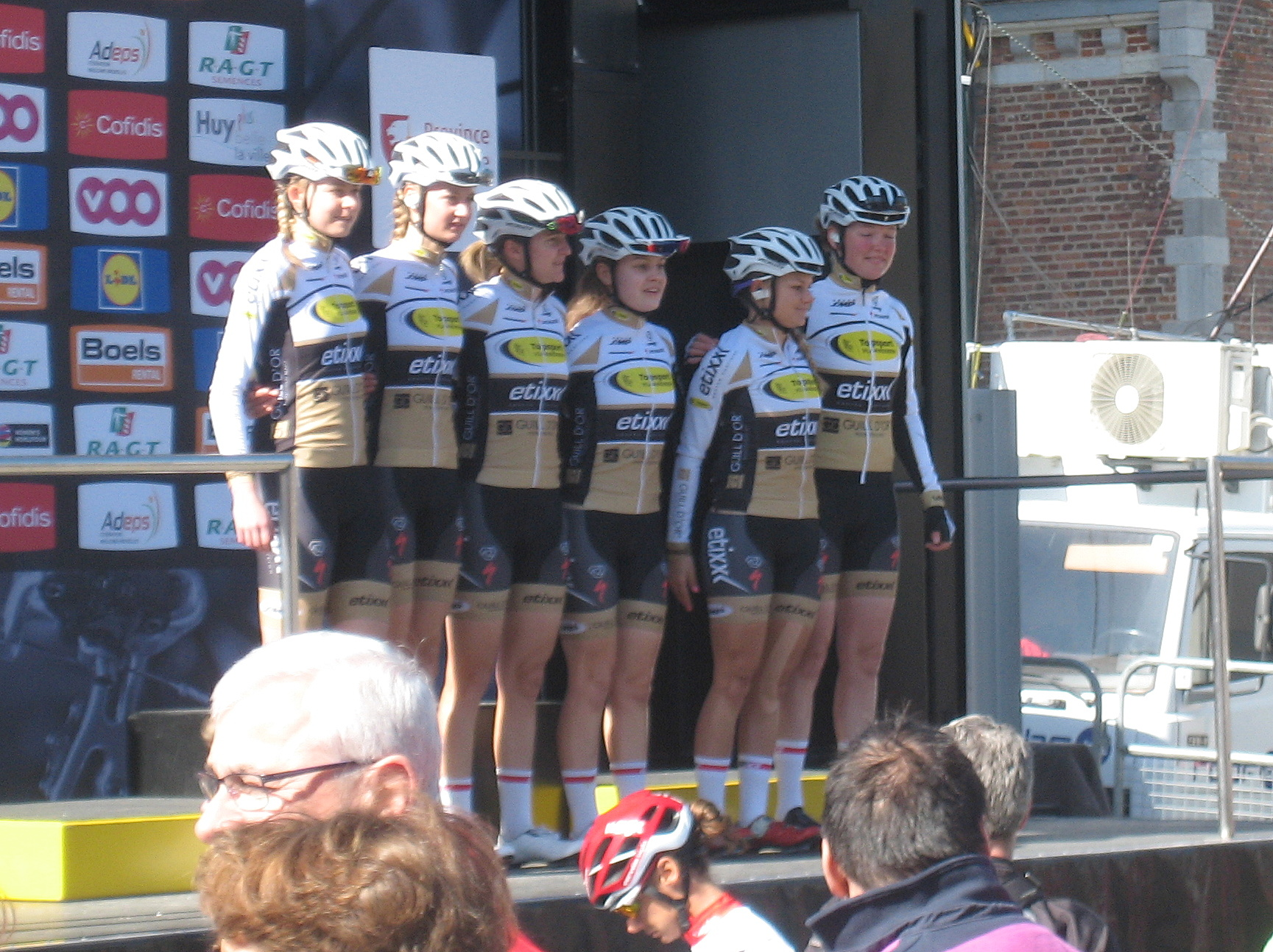
- The Topsport Vlaanderen–Etixx team at the start of the 2016 La Flèche Wallonne Féminine

Team information
- UCI code: EXP
- Registered: Belgium
- Founded: 2003
- Disbanded: 2018
- Discipline: Road
- Status: UCI Women's Team
- Bicycles: 2008–2010 Thompson; 2011–2015 Ridley; 2016–2018 Specialized
- Website: Team home page

Key personnel
- General manager: Christel Herremans
- Team manager: Davy Wijnant

Team name history
- 2003 2004 2005–2007 2008–2010 2011 2012 2013 2014–2015 2016 2017 2017 2018: Vlaanderen–T Interim Ladies Team; Vlaanderen–T Interim Univega Ladies Team; Vlaanderen–Capri Sonne–T Interim; Topsport Vlaanderen–Thompson Ladies Team; Topsport Vlaanderen–Ridley Team; Topsport Vlaanderen–Ridley; Topsport Vlaanderen–Bioracer; Topsport Vlaanderen–Pro-Duo; Topsport Vlaanderen–Etixx; Sport Vlaanderen–Etixx; Sport Vlaanderen–Guill D'or; Experza–Footlogix Ladies Cycling Team
Experza–Footlogix Ladies Cycling Team jersey
Jersey

Experza–Footlogix Ladies Cycling Team was a professional women's bicycle racing team based in Belgium.

The road racing team disbanded at the end of the 2018 season, although the team continues to compete in cyclocross.

== Team history ==
=== 2014 ===
==== Riders in ====
On October 24 Steffy Van Den Haute, Ann-Sophie Duyck, Lenny Druyts and Nicky Degrendele signed with the team. Kaat Hannes, Saartje Vandenbroucke, Kelly Van den Steen, Eva Maria Palm, Lotte Kopecky, Jessy Druyts, Demmy Druyts, Nel De Crits, Gilke Croket and Else Belmans signed extensions with the team.

== Major wins ==
2008
Stage 1 Omloop van Borsele, Jolien D'Hoore
Incourt, Sjoukje Dufoer
Flobecq, Sjoukje Dufoer
Chaumont-Gistoux, Loes Sels
Affligem, Sjoukje Dufoer
2009
Westkerke, Sjoukje Dufoer
Vlissegem, Katrien Van Looy
Incourt, Kelly Druyts
Provincial Championship Waals-Brabant, Kelly Druyts
Beauraing, Kelly Druyts
Wodecq, Jolien D'Hoore
2010
Provincial Time Trial Championship Limburg, Jessie Daams
2011
Provincial Time Trial Championship Antwerpen, Liesbet De Vocht
Stage 4 Gracia–Orlová, Lieselot Decroix
Provincial Road Race Championship Antwerpen, Jessy Druyts
Dwars door de Westhoek, Grace Verbeke
Stage 4 Holland Ladies Tour, Maaike Polspoel
UCI Track World Cup Cali (Scratch Race), Kelly Druyts
2012
Provincial Time Trial Championship Antwerpen, Lotte Kopecky
Provincial Time Trial Championship Vlaams-Brabant, Maaike Polspoel
Provincial Road Race Championship Antwerpen, Kelly Druyts
Boortmeerbeek, Maaike Polspoel
Boortmeerbeek (Juniors), Jessy Druyts
Provincial Road Race Championship Vlaams-Brabant, Maaike Polspoel
2014
Memorial Jacques Halleman, Kaat Hannes
Hillegem Road Race, Kelly Druyts
's Gravenwezel Road Race, Lotte Kopecky
Stage 6 Trophée d'Or Féminin, Kelly Druyts
Stage 4 Holland Ladies Tour, Kelly Druyts
Aigle Track Championships (Scratch race), Lotte Kopecky
Aigle Track Championships (Pursuit), Lotte Kopecky
Gent Track Championships (3km Pursuit), Lotte Kopecky
Gent Track Championships (Points race), Kelly Druyts
Gent Track Championships (Scratch race), Kelly Druyts
2015
Stage 1 (ITT) Auensteiner–Radsporttage, Ann-Sophie Duyck
2016
Stage 3 (ITT) Gracia–Orlová, Ann-Sophie Duyck
Ljubljana–Domžale–Ljubljana TT, Ann-Sophie Duyck
Provincial Time Trial Championship West-Vlaanderen, Ann-Sophie Duyck
Chrono des Nations, Ann-Sophie Duyck
2017
Provincial Time Trial Championship Antwerpen, Demmy Druyts
2018
Kasteelcross Zonnebeke, Thalita de Jong
Provincial Time Trial Championship Antwerpen, Jessy Druyts
Stage 2 Tour de Feminin-O cenu Českého Švýcarska, Agnieszka Skalniak
Flanders Ladies Classic, Séverine Eraud

== National and world champions ==
2008
Belgium Cyclo-cross, Loes Sels
World Junior Road Race, Jolien D'Hoore
Belgium Junior Road Race, Jolien D'Hoore
2009
Belgium Track (Omnium), Kelly Druyts
2011
Belgium Time Trial, Liesbet De Vocht
2012
Belgium Road Race, Jolien D'Hoore
Belgium Junior Time Trial, Lotte Kopecky
2013
Belgium Track (500m Time Trial), Kelly Druyts
Belgium Track (Points Race), Kelly Druyts
Belgium Track (Scratch Race), Gilke Croket
Belgium Track (Team Pursuit), Stephanie De Croock
Belgium Track (Team Pursuit), Gilke Croket
Belgium Track (Omnium), Else Belmans
2014
World Track (Scratch Race), Kelly Druyts
Belgium U23 Road Race, Lotte Kopecky
Belgium Track (500m TT), Kelly Druyts
Belgium Track (Scratch race), Kelly Druyts
Belgium Track (Points race), Demmy Druyts
Belgium Track (Pursuit), Lotte Kopecky
2015
Belgium Time Trial, Ann-Sophie Duyck
2016
Belgium Time Trial, Ann-Sophie Duyck
Belgium Track (Keirin), Nicky Degrendele
Belgium Track (Individual Sprint), Nicky Degrendele
2017
Belgium Junior Road Race, Lotte Rotman
2018
Belgium Track (500m time trial), Nicky Degrendele
Belgium Track (Keirin), Nicky Degrendele
Belgium U23 Time Trial, Nathalie Bex
Belgium U23 Road Race, Nathalie Bex
Poland U23 Time Trial, Agnieszka Skalniak

== Team roster ==
Rider	Date of birth
Manon Bakker (NED)	15 July 1999 (age 27)
Nathalie Bex (BEL)	12 April 1998 (age 28)
Thalita de Jong (NED)	6 November 1993 (age 32)
Jessy Druyts (BEL)	22 January 1994 (age 32)
Lenny Druyts (BEL)	18 May 1997 (age 29)
Axellle Dubau-Prevot (FRA)	31 July 1996 (age 30)
Séverine Eraud (FRA)	24 May 1992 (age 34)

Rider	Date of birth
Trine Holmsgaard (DEN)	4 September 1997 (age 29)
Sara Mustonen (SWE)	8 February 1981 (age 45)
Sarah Rijkes (AUT)	2 April 1991 (age 35)
Lotte Rotman (BEL)	19 June 1999 (age 27)
Agnieszka Skalniak (POL)	22 April 1997 (age 29)
Susanna Zorzi (ITA)	13 March 1992 (age 34)
