= Quaregnon =

Municipality in Hainaut Province, Wallonia, Belgium

Quaregnon Couargnon (Picard)
- Municipality
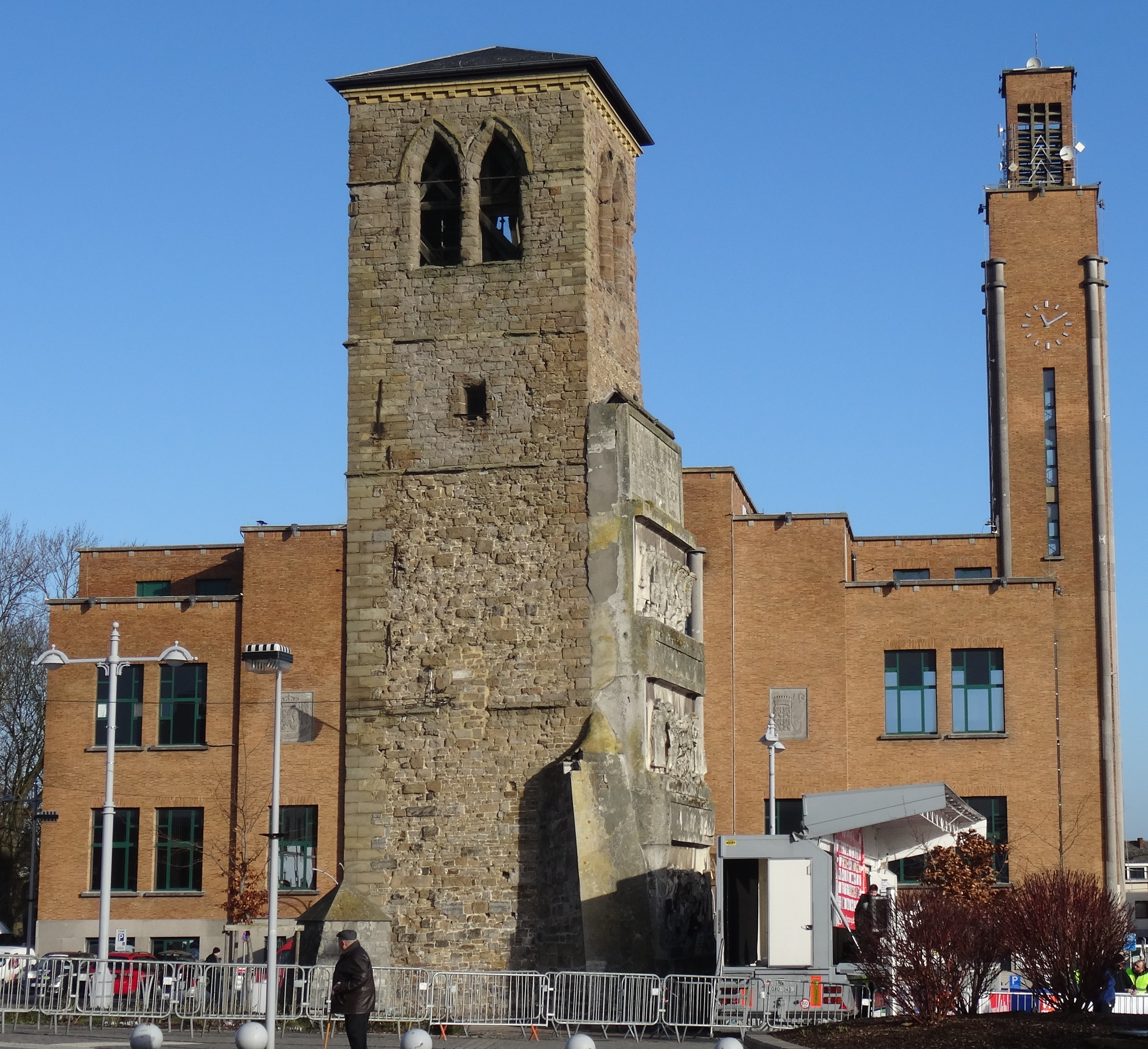

- Flag Coat of arms

- Location of Quaregnon in Hainaut
- Interactive map of Quaregnon
- Location in Belgium
- Coordinates: 50°26′N 03°51′E
- Country: Belgium
- Community: French Community
- Region: Wallonia
- Province: Hainaut
- Arrondissement: Mons

Government
  - Mayor: Damien Jenart (PS)
  - Governing party: PS

Area
  - Total: 11.21 km^{2} (4.33 sq mi)

Population (2018-01-01)
  - Total: 19,006
  - Density: 1,695/km^{2} (4,391/sq mi)
- Postal codes: 7390
- NIS code: 53065
- Area codes: 065
- Website: www.quaregnon.be

Quaregnon (French pronunciation: [kaʁɲɔ̃]; Picard: Couargnon; Walloon: Cargnon) is a municipality of Wallonia located in the province of Hainaut, Belgium.

On 1 January 2018 Quaregnon had a total population of 19,006. The total area is 11.08 km^{2} which gives a population density of 1,716 inhabitants per km^{2}.

The municipality consists of the following districts: Quaregnon and Wasmuel.

== See also ==
- Charter of Quaregnon
