= Dour, Belgium =

Municipality in Hainaut Province, Wallonia, Belgium

Dour Doû (Picard)
- Municipality
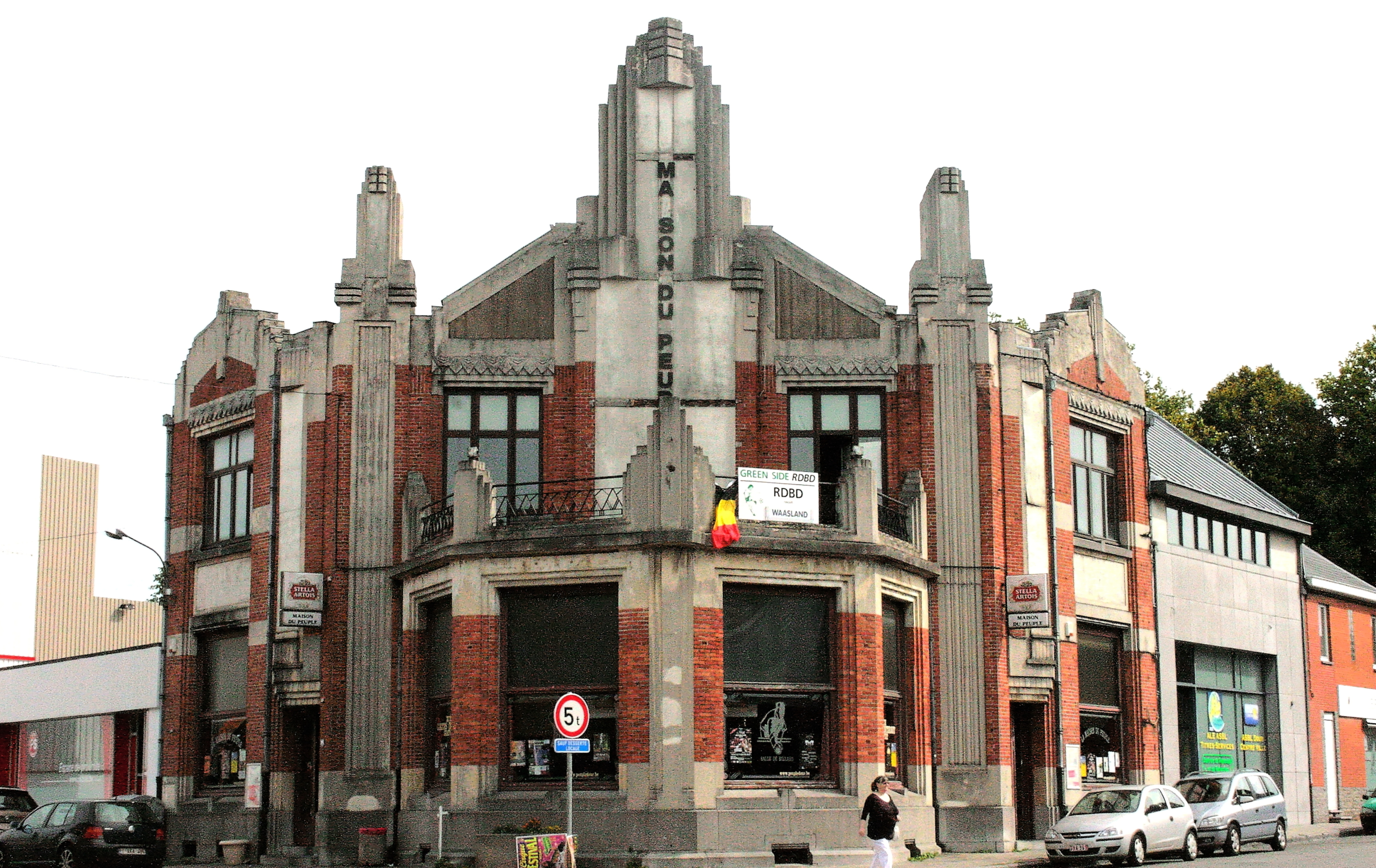

- Flag Coat of arms

- Location of Dour in Hainaut
- Interactive map of Dour
- Location in Belgium
- Coordinates: 50°24′N 03°47′E
- Country: Belgium
- Community: French Community
- Region: Wallonia
- Province: Hainaut
- Arrondissement: Mons

Government
  - Mayor: Carlo Di Antonio (cdH) (Dour Demain)
  - Governing party: Dour Demain (cdH+MR+independents)

Area
  - Total: 33.62 km^{2} (12.98 sq mi)

Population (2018-01-01)
  - Total: 16,716
  - Density: 497.2/km^{2} (1,288/sq mi)
- Postal codes: 7370
- NIS code: 53020
- Area codes: 065
- Website: www.communedour.be

Dour (French pronunciation: [duʁ]; Picard: Doû) is a municipality of Wallonia located in the province of Hainaut, Belgium.

On 1 January 2006 the municipality had 16,810 inhabitants. The total area is 33.32 km^{2}, giving a population density of 505 inhabitants per km^{2}.

The municipality consists of the following districts: Blaugies, Dour, Élouges, and Wihéries.

Dour is often considered the western end of the sillon industriel, the former industrial backbone of Wallonia.

Since 1989, Dour has hosted the annual Dour Festival, a music festival covering various genres.
