= European Road Championships – Women's junior time trial =

European Road Championships – Women's junior time trial is the annual European championship race for road bicycle racing for women in the Junior category. It is organised by the European governing body, the European Cycling Union. The winner of the event is entitled to wear the European jersey in Junior competitions for one year.

== Medal winners ==
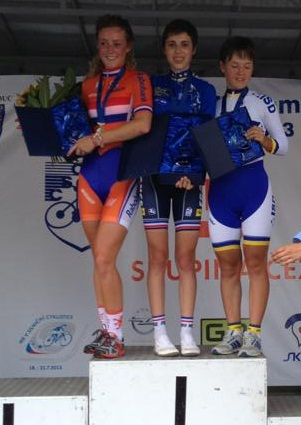
Podium in 2013: 1) Séverine Eraud, 2) Floortje Mackaij and 3) Olena Demidova

Championships	Gold	Silver	Bronze
2005	Aleksandra Dawidowicz; Poland	Aušrinė Trebaitė; Lithuania	Lesya Kalytovska; Ukraine
2006	Mie Lacota; Denmark	Trine Schmidt; Denmark	Alexandra Burchenkova; Russia
2007	Valeriya Kononenko; Ukraine	Anne-Marie Schmitt; Luxembourg	Alena Amialiusik; Belarus
2008	Valeriya Kononenko; Ukraine	Jacqueline Hahn; Austria	Maria Mishina; Russia
2009	Pauline Ferrand-Prévot; France	Hanna Solovey; Ukraine	Maria Grandt Petersen; Denmark
2010	Hanna Solovey; Ukraine	Pauline Ferrand-Prévot; France	Alexia Muffat; France
2011	Rossella Ratto; Italy	Mathilde Favre; France	Svetlana Kashirina; Russia
2012	Corine van der Zijden; Netherlands	Kseniya Dobrynina; Russia	Lotte Kopecky; Belgium
2013	Séverine Eraud; France	Floortje Mackaij; Netherlands	Olena Demidova; Ukraine
2014	Aafke Soet; Netherlands	Alice Gasparini; Italy	Greta Richioud; France
2015	Agnieszka Skalniak; Poland	Kseniia Tsymbalyuk; Russia	Yara Kastelijn; Netherlands
2016	Lisa Morzenti; Italy	Alessia Vigilia; Italy	Juliette Labous; France
2017	Elena Pirrone; Italy	Letizia Paternoster; Italy	Emma Norsgaard Jørgensen; Denmark
2018	Vittoria Guazzini; Italy	Hannah Ludwig; Germany	Marta Jaskulska; Poland
2019	Shirin van Anrooij; Netherlands	Aigul Gareeva; Russia	Wilma Olausson; Sweden
2020	Elise Uijen; Netherlands	Maeva Squiban; France	Carlotta Cipressi; Italy
2021	Alena Ivanchenko; Russia	Antonia Niedermaier; Germany	Elise Uijen; Netherlands
2022	Justyna Czapla; Germany	Églantine Rayer; France	Febe Jooris; Belgium
2023	Federica Venturelli; Italy	Stina Kagevi; Sweden	Hannah Kunz; Germany
2024	Paula Ostiz; Spain	Fee Knaven; Netherlands	Viktória Chladoňová; Slovakia
2025	Paula Ostiz; Spain	Magdalena Leis; Germany	Oda Aune Gissinger; Norway

=== Medallists by nation ===
Updated after the 2025 European Road Championships

Rank	Nation	Gold	Silver	Bronze	Total
1	Italy	5	3	1	9
2	Netherlands	4	2	2	8
3	Ukraine	3	1	2	6
4	France	2	4	3	9
5	Poland	2	0	1	3
6	Spain	2	0	0	2
7	Russia	1	3	3	7
8	Germany	1	3	1	5
9	Denmark	1	1	2	4
10	Sweden	0	1	1	2
11	Austria	0	1	0	1
11	Lithuania	0	1	0	1
11	Luxembourg	0	1	0	1
14	Belgium	0	0	2	2
15	Belarus	0	0	1	1
15	Norway	0	0	1	1
15	Slovakia	0	0	1	1
Totals (17 entries)		21	21	21	63
