= 2013 UCI Road World Championships – Qualification =

This page is an overview of the qualification criteria for the 2013 UCI Road World Championships.

== Elite events ==
=== Elite men's road race ===
Qualification was based on performances on the UCI run tours during 2013. Results from January to the middle of August would count towards the qualification criteria on both the 2013 UCI World Tour and the UCI Continental Circuits across the world, with the rankings being determined upon the release of the numerous tour rankings on 15 August 2013.

All places to be confirmed as of 15 August 2013.

14 to be enrolled, 9 to start
Australia
Colombia
France
Italy
Netherlands
Poland
Spain
Switzerland
12 to be enrolled, 8 to start
Great Britain
11 to be enrolled, 7 to start
Belgium
Czech Republic
United States
9 to be enrolled, 6 to start
Austria
Germany
Iran
Morocco
Slovakia
Slovenia
Ukraine
Venezuela
6 to be enrolled, 4 to start
Algeria
Ireland
5 to be enrolled, 3 to start
Brazil
Canada
Costa Rica
Croatia
Denmark
Eritrea
Estonia
Hong Kong
Kazakhstan
Latvia
Lithuania
Malaysia
Mexico
New Zealand
Norway
Portugal
Russia
Sweden
Turkey
Venezuela
3 to be enrolled, 2 to start
South Africa
2 to be enrolled, 1 to start
Argentina
Belarus
Bulgaria
Ecuador
Finland
Greece
Hungary
Luxembourg
Moldova
Romania
Serbia
Tunisia

=== Elite women's road race ===
Qualification was based mainly on the 2013 UCI Nation Ranking as of 15 August 2013. The first five nations in this classification qualified 7 riders to start, the next ten nations qualified 6 riders to start and the next 5 nations qualified 5 riders to start. Other nations and non ranked nations had the possibility to send 3 riders to start.

- Netherlands (7)
- Italy (7)
- Australia (7)
- United States (7)
- Sweden (7)
- Germany (6)
- United Kingdom (6)
- Russia (6)
- Belgium (6)
- Poland (6)
- New Zealand (6)
- Canada (6)
- France (6)
- South Africa (6)
- Belarus (6)
- Brazil (5)
- Colombia (5)
- Ukraine (5)
- Lithuania (5)
- Luxembourg (5)
- All other National Federations (3)

Moreover, the outgoing World Champion and continental champions were able to take part in the race.

- Outgoing World Champion: Marianne Vos (NED)
- African Champion: Ashleigh Moolman (RSA)
- American Champion: Alenis Sierra (CUB)
- Asian Champion: Mei Yu Hsia (TPE)
- European Champion: Susanna Zorzi (ITA)
- Oceanian Champion: Amy Bradley (AUS)

=== Elite men's time trial ===
All National Federations may enter 4 riders of whom 2 may start. In addition to this number, the outgoing World Champion and the current continental champions may take part.

=== Elite women's time trial ===
All National Federations may enter 4 riders of whom 2 may start. Besides of that, the outgoing World Champion and the continental champions may take part in addition to this number.

Champion	Name	Note
Outgoing World Champion	Judith Arndt (GER)	Did not participate (retired)
African Champion	Ashleigh Moolman (RSA)	Did not participate
American Champion	Íngrid Drexel (MEX)	Did not participate
Asian Champion	Tüvshinjargalyn Enkhjargal (MGL)	
European Champion (under-23)	Hanna Solovey (UKR)	
Oceanian Champion	Taryn Heather (AUS)	Did not participate

=== Men's team time trial ===
It's an obligation for all 2013 UCI ProTeams to participate. Besides of that invitations are sent to the 20 leading teams of the 2013 UCI Europe Tour, top 5 leading teams of the 2013–14 UCI America Tour and 2013–14 UCI Asia Tour and the leading teams of the 2013–14 UCI Africa Tour and 2013 UCI Oceania Tour on 15 August 2013. Teams that accept the invitation within the deadline have the right to participate. Every participating team may register nine riders from its team roster (excluding stagiaires) and has to select six riders to compete in the event.

=== Women's team time trial ===
Invitations were sent to the 25 leading UCI Women's Teams in the UCI Team Ranking as of 15 August 2014. Teams that accepted the invitation within the deadline had the right to participate. Every participating team had the opportunity to register nine riders from its team roster, with the exception of stagiaires, and had to select six riders to compete in the event.

Teams that did not accept the invitation are listed below in italics.

Top 25 as of 15 August 2014

#	Nat	Team
1	(Netherlands)	Rabobank-Liv Woman Cycling Team
2	(Netherlands)	Boels–Dolmans
3	(Australia)	Orica–AIS
4	(Netherlands)	Giant–Shimano
5	(United States)	Specialized–lululemon
6	(United Kingdom)	Wiggle–Honda
7	(Norway)	Hitec Products
8	(Russia)	RusVelo
9	(Italy)	Alé–Cipollini
10	(Italy)	Astana BePink Women's Team
12	(Belgium)	Lotto–Belisol Ladies
13	(United States)	UnitedHealthcare
14	(United States)	Optum p/b Kelly Benefit Strategies
15	(Italy)	Servetto Footon
16	(Switzerland)	Bigla Cycling Team
17	(Slovenia)	BTC City Ljubljana
18	(Italy)	S.C. Michela Fanini Rox
19	(United States)	TIBCO / To The Top
20	(Netherlands)	Futurumshop.nl–Zannata
21	(France)	Poitou–Charentes.Futuroscope.86
22	(Spain)	Lointek
23	(Spain)	Bizkaia–Durango
24	(Belgium)	Topsport Vlaanderen–Pro-Duo
25	(Italy)	Top Girls Fassa Bortolo

== Under-23 events ==
=== Men's under-23 road race ===
Qualification is based on performances on the UCI run tours and the Men Under 23 Nations’ Cup during 2013. Results from January to the middle of August would count towards the qualification criteria. The first 5 nations of the final classification of the Men Under 23 Nations’ Cup are entitled to an extra rider. In addition to this number the current continental champions may take part. The outgoing World Champion is not allowed to start because she is not an under-23 rider

=== Men's under-23 time trial ===
All National Federations may enter 4 riders of whom 2 may start. In addition to this number, the outgoing World Champion and the current continental champions may take part.

== Junior events ==
=== Men's junior road race ===
Qualification will be based mainly on the final UCI Juniors Nations' Cup ranking as of 15 August 2013. The first ten nations in this classification qualified 6 riders to start, the next five nations qualified 5 riders to start and the next 5 nations qualified 4 riders to start. Spain, as the organizing nation, shall be entitled 5 riders to start. Other nations and non ranked nations had the possibility to send 3 riders to start. Moreover, continental champions are qualified to take part in the race on top of the nation numbers. The outgoing World Champion is not allowed to take part because he is not a junior rider anymore.

=== Women's junior road race ===
All National Federations may enter 8 riders of whom 4 may start. Besides of that, the below listed continental champions may be entered in addition to this number.

Champion	Name
American Champion	Brenda Santoyo (MEX)
Asian Champion	Yao Pang (HKG)
European Champion	Greta Richioud (FRA)
Oceanian Champion	Josie Talbot (AUS)

=== Men's junior time trial ===
All National Federations could enter 4 riders of whom 2 could start. Besides of that, the below listed continental champions could take part in addition to this number.

=== Women's junior time trial ===
All National Federations could enter 4 riders of whom 2 could start. Besides of that, the below listed continental champions could take part in addition to this number.

Champion	Name
American Champion	Jessenia Meneses (COL)
Asian Champion	Yao Pang (HKG)
European Champion	Séverine Eraud (FRA)
Oceanian Champion	Emily McRedmond (AUS)
