= 2013 European Road Championships – Women's junior road race =

Women's junior road race
2013 European Road Championships
- UEC European Champion jersey

Race details
- Dates: 21 July 2013 in (Czech Republic) Olomouc (CZE)
- Stages: 1
- Distance: 77 km (48 mi)
- Winning time: 2h 16' 46"

The Women's junior road race at the 2013 European Road Championships took place on 21 July. The Championships were hosted by the Czech Republic city of Olomouc. The course was 77 km long. 82 junior cyclists competed in this discipline.

== Top 25 final classification ==
Rank	Rider	Time
1st place, gold medalist(s)	Greta Richioud (FRA)	2h 16' 46"
2nd place, silver medalist(s)	Séverine Eraud (FRA)	+ 3"
3rd place, bronze medalist(s)	Ksenyia Tuhai (BLR)	+ 3"
4	Marine Lemarie (FRA)	+ 3"
5	Olena Demidova (UKR)	+ 3"
6	Arianna Fidanze (ITA)	+ 3"
7	Kristina Saveleva (RUS)	+ 3"
8	Milda Jankauskaite (LTU)	+ 3"
9	Lotte Kopecky (BEL)	+ 3"
10	Zavinta Titenyte (LTU)	+ 3"
11	Anastasia Iakovenko (RUS)	+ 3"
12	Solène Vinsot (FRA)	+ 3"
13	Kelly Vandensteen (BEL)	+ 3"
14	Amalie Dideriksen (DEN)	+ 20"
15	Jelena Erić (SRB)	+ 23"
16	Bogumila Dziuba (POL)	+ 23"
17	Angela Maffeis (ITA)	+ 26"
18	Astrid Gabner (AUT)	+ 31"
19	Kaat Van der Meulen (BEL)	+ 31"
20	Demmy Druyts (BEL)	+ 31"
21	Floortje Mackaij (NED)	+ 31"
22	Elisabeth Reigler (AUT)	+ 31"
23	Jeanne Koorevaar (NED)	+ 31"
24	Valentina Nesterova (RUS)	+ 53"
25	Alicia González Blanco (ESP)	+ 1' 17"

== See also ==
- 2013 European Road Championships – Women's junior time trial
