= 2013 UCI Road World Championships – Women's junior time trial =

Women's junior time trial
2013 UCI Road World Championships
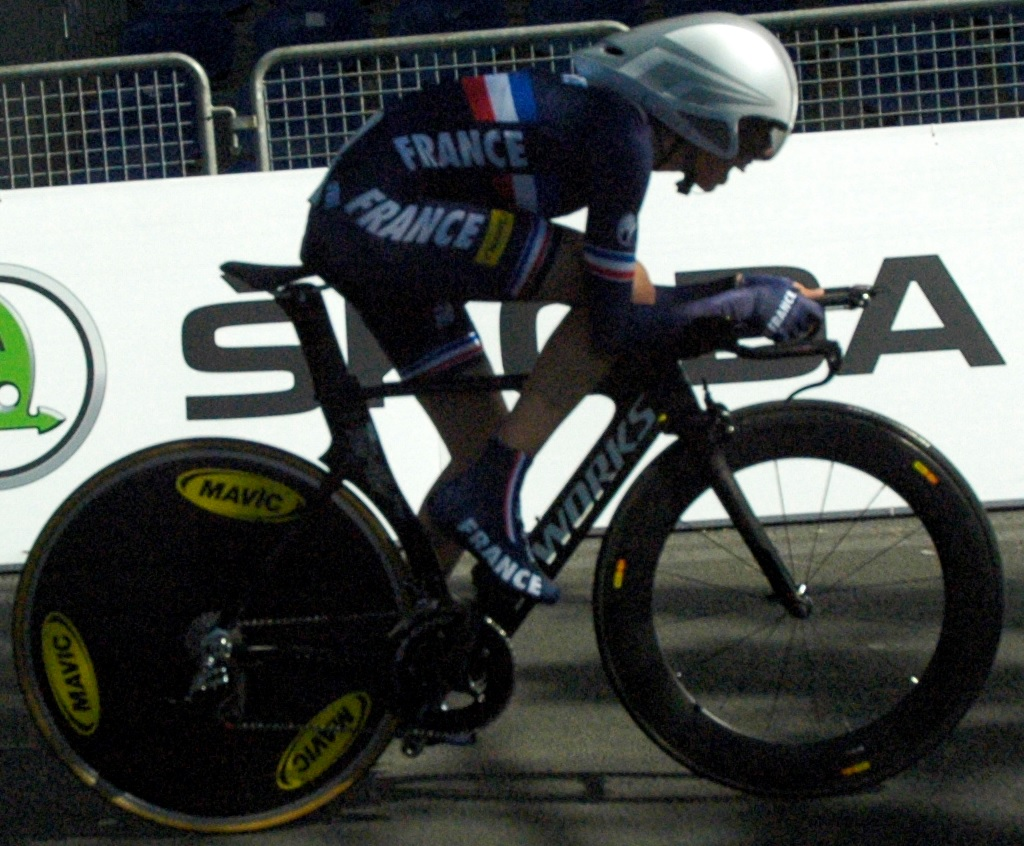
- Winner Séverine Eraud

Race details
- Dates: 23 September 2013
- Stages: 1
- Distance: 16.27 km (10.11 mi)
- Winning time: 22' 42.63"

Medalists
	Gold	Séverine Eraud (France)
	Silver	Alexandria Nicholls (Australia)
	Bronze	Alexandra Manly (Australia)

The Women's junior time trial of the 2013 UCI Road World Championships is a cycling event that took place on 23 September 2013 in the region of Tuscany, Italy.

The course of the race was 16.27 km from the Cascine to the Nelson Mandela Forum in Florence.

== Qualification ==
All National Federations could enter 4 riders of whom 2 could start. Besides of that, the below listed continental champions could take part in addition to this number.

Champion	Name
American Champion	Jessenia Meneses (COL)
Asian Champion	Yao Pang (HKG)
European Champion	Séverine Eraud (FRA)
Oceanian Champion	Emily McRedmond (AUS)

== Participating nations ==
30 nations participated in the women's junior time trial.

- Argentina
- Australia
- Austria
- Belgium
- Belarus
- Canada
- Colombia
- Czech Republic
- Denmark
- Spain
- France
- Germany
- Hong Kong
- Israel
- Italy
- Jordan
- Japan
- Lithuania
- Mexico
- Netherlands
- Norway
- New Zealand
- Poland
- South Africa
- Russia
- Slovakia
- Sweden
- Thailand
- Ukraine
- United States

== Schedule ==
Date	Time	Event
23 September 2013	10:00-11:25	Women's junior time trial
23 September 2013	11:45	Victory ceremony

== Final classification ==
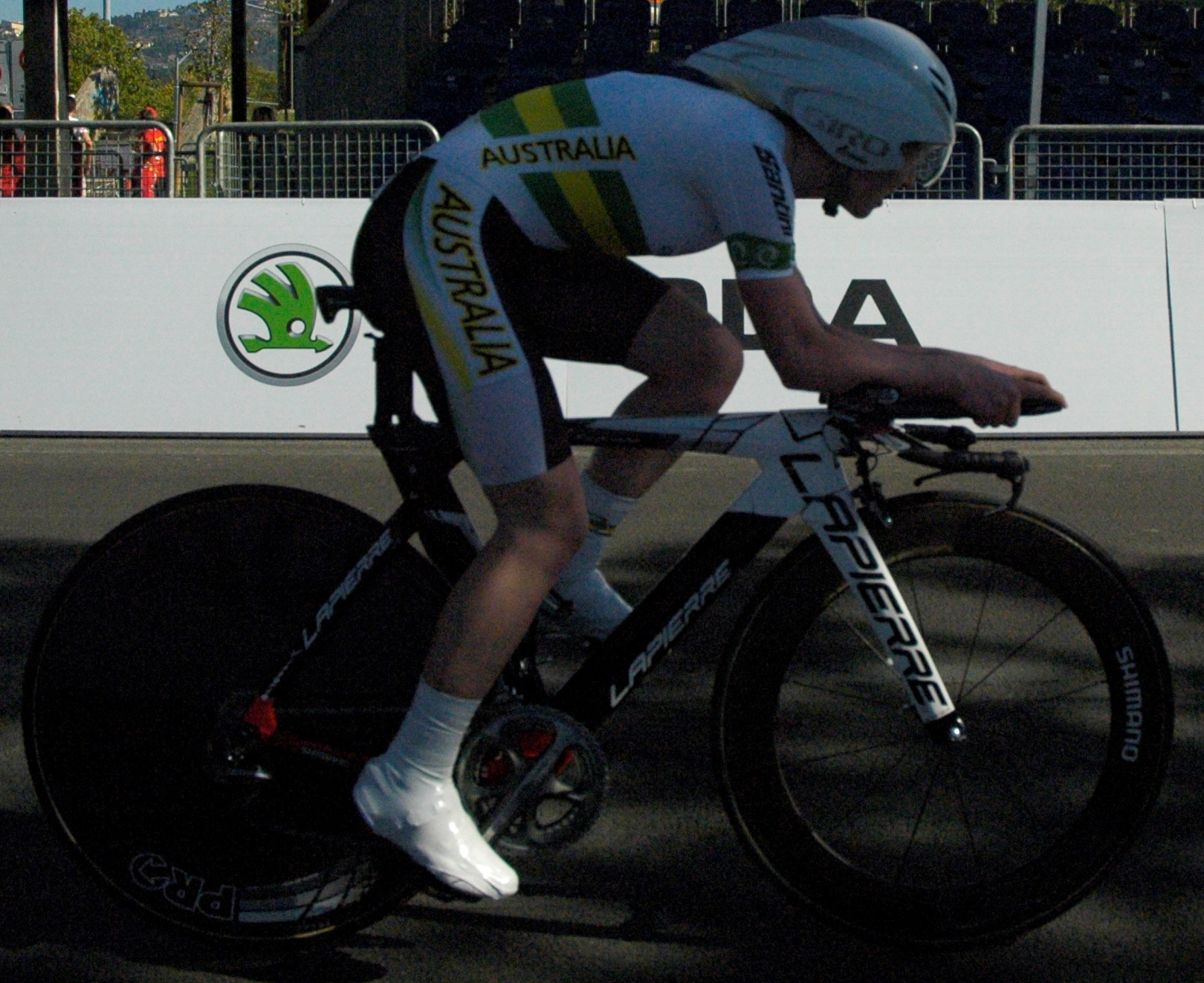
Alexandra Manly won bronze.

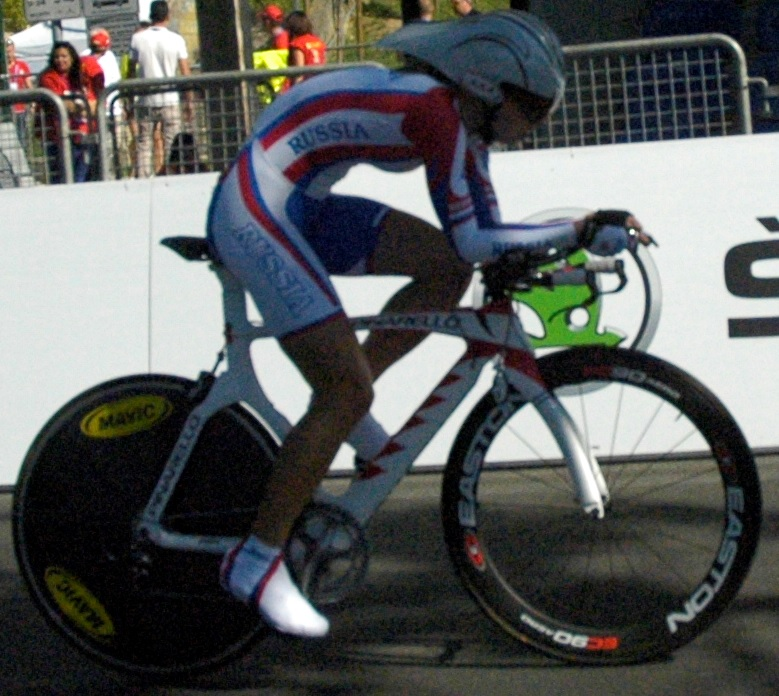
Anastasiia Iakovenko finished fifth.

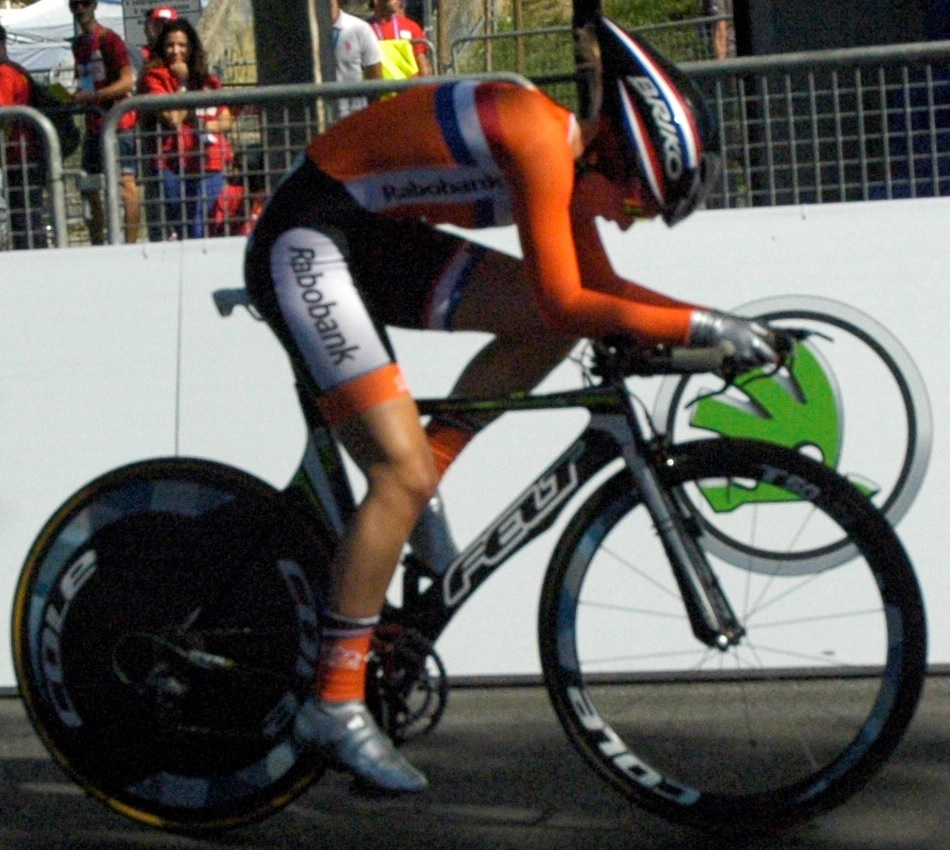
Demi de Jong finished sixth.

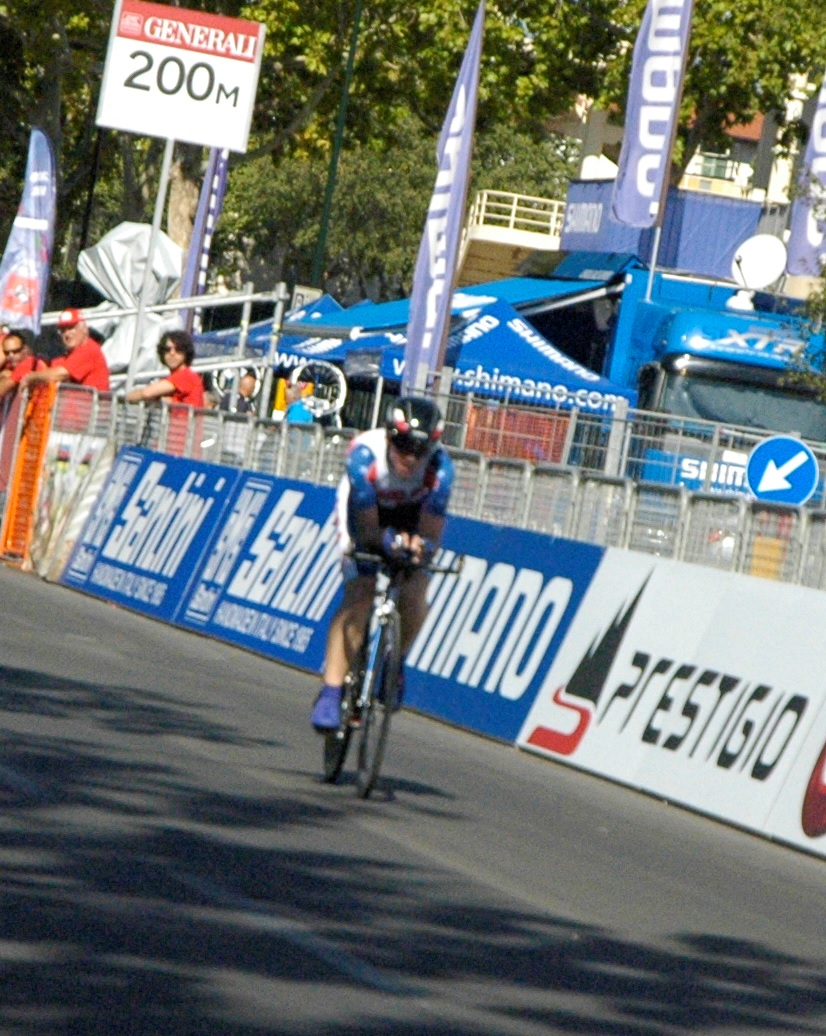
Kelly Catlin finished seventh.

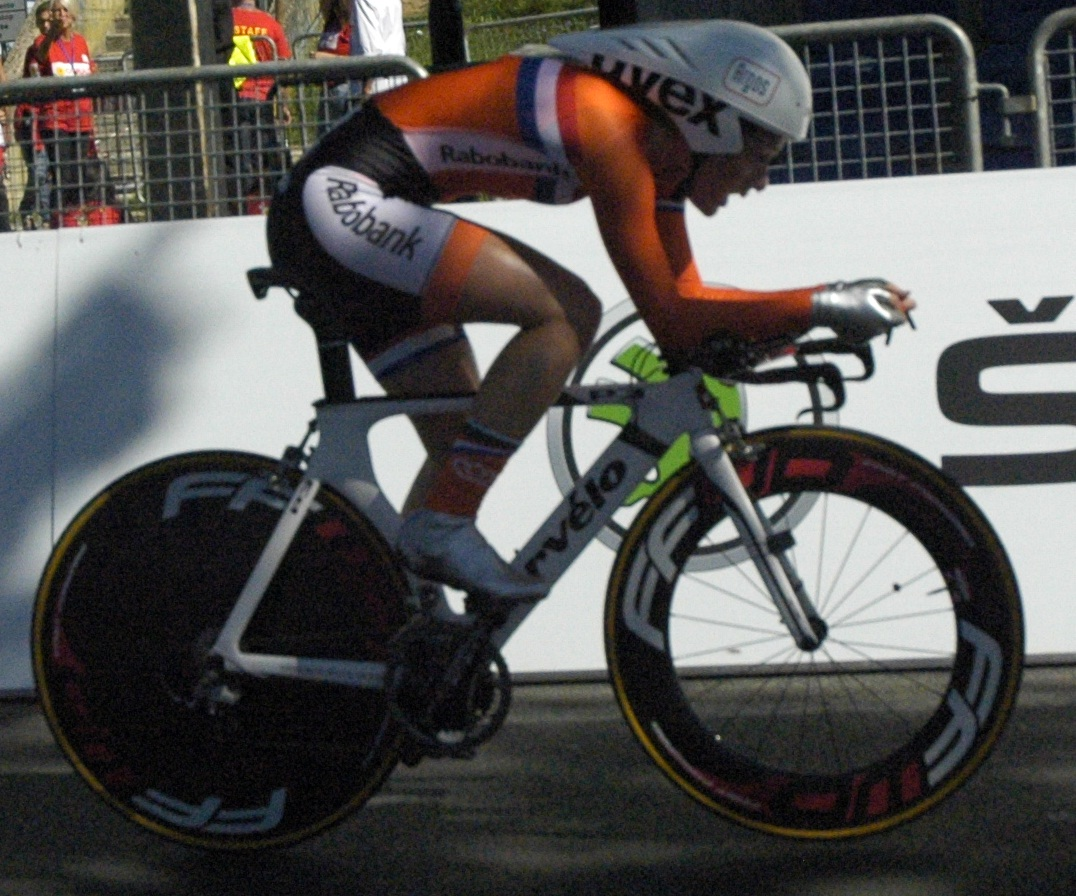
Floortje Mackaij finished eighth.

Rank	Rider	Country	Time
1	Séverine Eraud	France	22' 42.63"
1	Alexandria Nicholls	Australia	+ 2.69"
1	Alexandra Manly	Australia	+ 8.17"
4	Zavinta Titenyte	Lithuania	+ 11.49"
5	Anastasia Iakovenko	Russia	+ 13.05"
6	Demi de Jong	Netherlands	+ 14.11"
7	Kelly Catlin	United States	+ 20.72"
8	Floortje Mackaij	Netherlands	+ 21.04"
9	Kinley Gibson	Canada	+ 22.81"
10	Luisa Kattinger	Germany	+ 23.47"
11	Olena Demydova	Ukraine	+ 23.73"
12	Cecilie Uttrup Ludwig	Denmark	+ 28.52"
13	Heidi Dalton	South Africa	+ 30.36"
14	Hélène Gérard	France	+ 31.91"
15	Devon Hiley	New Zealand	+ 32.78"
16	Anastasiia Pliaskina	Russia	+ 38.47"
17	Francesca Pattaro	Italy	+ 41.71"
18	Katsiaryna Piatrouskaya	Belarus	+ 44.73"
19	Agata Drozdek	Poland	+ 46.62"
20	Manon Bourdiaux	France	+ 47.45"
21	Hannah Swan	United States	+ 49.08"
22	Yao Pang	Hong Kong	+ 49.61"
23	Anna Knauer	Germany	+ 50.37"
24	Julia Karlsson	Sweden	+ 51.09"
25	Kaat Van der Meulen	Belgium	+ 51.82"
26	Lotte Kopecky	Belgium	+ 54.04"
27	Rasa Pocytė	Lithuania	+ 55.12"
28	Bogumila Dziuba	Poland	+ 55.90"
29	Amalie Dideriksen	Denmark	+ 59.35"
30	Solveig Edøy	Norway	+ 1’ 00.43"
31	Jessica Parra Rojas	Colombia	+ 1’ 01.32"
32	Emily McRedmond	Australia	+ 1’ 07.21"
33	Polina Yurieva	Ukraine	+ 1’ 08.25"
34	Eliška Drahotová	Czech Republic	+ 1’ 15.32"
35	Tereza Medveďová	Slovakia	+ 1’ 16.68"
36	Kiyoka Sakaguchi	Japan	+ 1’ 23.88"
37	Jessenia Meneses	Colombia	+ 1’ 25.70"
38	Maddi Campbell	New Zealand	+ 1’ 29.35"
39	Michela Maltese	Italy	+ 1’ 30.24"
40	Natasha Jaworski	Argentina	+ 1’ 35.27"
41	Razan Soboh	Jordan	+ 1’ 55.61"
42	Jaruwan Somrat	Thailand	+ 2’ 04.39"
43	Ksenia Tuhai	Belarus	+ 2’ 05.46"
44	Frida Mendoza	Mexico	+ 2’ 07.34"
45	Alicia González Blanco	Spain	+ 2’ 12.74"
46	Kajsa Persson	Sweden	+ 2’ 17.43"
47	Alba Teruel	Spain	+ 2’ 25.60"
-	Anežka Drahotová	Czech Republic	DNS

DNS = Did not start

== See also ==
- 2005 UCI Juniors Road World Championships – Women's time trial
