= 2013 UCI Road World Championships – Men's junior time trial =

Men's junior time trial
2013 UCI Road World Championships
- Rainbow jersey

Race details
- Dates: 24 September 2013
- Stages: 1

The Men's junior time trial of the 2013 UCI Road World Championships took place in Tuscany, Italy on 24 September 2013.

== Final classification ==
Rank	Rider	Country	Time
1st place, gold medalist(s)	Igor Decraene	Belgium	26 min 56 s 83
2nd place, silver medalist(s)	Mathias Krigbaum	Denmark	+8 s 66
3rd place, bronze medalist(s)	Zeke Mostov	United States	+20 s 97
4	Joshua Stritzinger	Germany	+23 s 64
5	Matthew Gibson	Great Britain	+30 s 16
6	Ole Forfang	Norway	+44 s 21
7	Corentin Ermenault	France	+44 s 40
8	Dmitriy Rive	Kazakhstan	+46 s 24
9	Nikolay Cherkasov	Russia	+49 s 87
10	Michael Dessau	United States	+53 s 16
11	Emil Wang	Denmark	+53 s 77
12	Stepan Kurianov	Russia	+59 s 61
13	Thomas Kaesler	Australia	+1 min 0 s 39
14	Daniel Fitter	Australia	+1 min 1 s 57
15	Michał Paluta	Poland	+1 min 6 s 82
16	Piotr Konwa	Poland	+1 min 9 s 69
17	Nathan Van Hooydonck	Belgium	+1 min 9 s 76
18	Edoardo Affini	Italy	+1 min 12 s 48
19	Jack Burke	Canada	+1 min 13 s 31
20	Tom Wirtgen	Luxembourg	+1 min 16 s 13
21	Timur Maleiev	Ukraine	+1 min 16 s 63
22	Jon Božic	Slovenia	+1 min 16 s 70
23	David Per	Slovenia	+1 min 20 s 76
24	Pontus Kastemyr	Sweden	+1 min 21 s 86
25	Oliver Mattheis	Germany	+1 min 24 s 32
26	Mark Padun	Ukraine	+1 min 27 s 19
27	Ryan Felgate	South Africa	+1 min 27 s 41
28	Eduardo Estrada	Colombia	+1 min 33 s 89
29	Atsushi Oka	Japan	+1 min 34 s 27
30	Hampus Anderberg	Sweden	+1 min 34 s 65
31	Daniel Martínez	Colombia	+1 min 36 s 39
32	Filippo Ganna	Italy	+1 min 37 s 70
33	Artem Nych	Russia	+1 min 37 s 91
34	Ivan Venter	South Africa	+1 min 38 s 29
35	Juan Camacho del Fresno	Spain	+1 min 40 s 26
36	Sam Oomen	Netherlands	+1 min 41 s 80
37	Adam Jamieson	Canada	+1 min 43 s 91
38	Abderrahmane Bechlagheme	Algeria	+1 min 45 s 47
39	Andrej Petrovski	North Macedonia	+1 min 50 s 87
40	Dominic Von Burg	Switzerland	+1 min 56 s 37
41	Andrei Covalciuc	Moldova	+1 min 59 s 95
42	Amanuel Mengis Ghebreindrias	Eritrea	+2 min 13 s 26
43	Facundo Crisafulli	Argentina	+2 min 14 s 29
44	Patrick Müller	Switzerland	+2 min 15 s 13
45	Anton Ivashkin	Belarus	+2 min 15 s 21
46	Luc Turchi	Luxembourg	+2 min 16 s 35
47	Gaspar Gonçalves	Portugal	+2 min 16 s 68
48	Mark Downey	Ireland	+2 min 16 s 80
49	Cristopher Jurado	Panama	+2 min 18 s 49
50	Mathieu van der Poel	Netherlands	+2 min 19 s 33
51	Rémi Cavagna	France	+2 min 20 s 39
52	Michal Schlegel	Czech Republic	+2 min 21 s 20
53	Abderrahmane Mansouri	Algeria	+2 min 23 s 93
54	Alexey Voloshin	Kazakhstan	+2 min 24 s 37
55	Adrian Dumitru Zamfir	Romania	+2 min 28 s 49
56	Milan Holomek	Slovakia	+2 min 30 s 46
57	Aliaksandr Riabushenko	Belarus	+2 min 31 s 14
58	Matas Mickevičius	Lithuania	+2 min 32 s 73
59	Elgün Alizada	Azerbaijan	+2 min 35 s 02
60	Onur Balkan	Turkey	+2 min 35 s 16
61	János Pelikán	Hungary	+2 min 37 s 42
62	Marco-Tapio Niemi	Finland	+2 min 37 s 50
63	Iván García	Spain	+2 min 37 s 86
64	Grigoriy Shtein	Kazakhstan	+2 min 40 s 88
65	Raivis Sarkans	Latvia	+2 min 50 s 07
66	Juraj Bellan	Slovakia	+2 min 50 s 30
67	Santiago Fermin Quiroga	Argentina	+2 min 50 s 34
68	Andrejs Podāns	Latvia	+2 min 50 s 48
69	Martynas Stasikelis	Lithuania	+2 min 53 s 59
70	Victor Langellotti	Monaco	+2 min 54 s 83
71	Nako Georgiev	Bulgaria	+2 min 55 s 64
72	Lucian Buga	Romania	+2 min 59 s 83
73	Andrea Maccagli	San Marino	+3 min 5 s 71
74	Stylianos Farantakis	Greece	+3 min 6 s 05
75	Sergey Medvedev	Uzbekistan	+3 min 7 s 52
76	Vedat Koç	Turkey	+3 min 14 s 19
77	Cesar Martingil	Portugal	+3 min 14 s 55
78	Jared Said González	Mexico	+3 min 16 s 84
79	Nijat Niftaliyev	Azerbaijan	+3 min 20 s 26
80	Iltjan Nika	Albania	+3 min 37 s 12
81	Ekke-Kaur Vosman	Estonia	+3 min 41 s 75
82	Kwong Lau	Hong Kong	+3 min 53 s 78
83	Sapar Serdarov	Turkmenistan	+3 min 54 s 70
84	Ridion Kopshti	Albania	+3 min 56 s 55
-	Khusniddin Khakimov	Uzbekistan	DNS
