= 2013 UCI Road World Championships =

Cycling world championships

- Location within Tuscany Location within Italy
- Venue: Tuscany, Italy
- Date: 22–29 September 2013
- Coordinates: 43°46′17″N 11°15′15″E
- Nations participating: 76
- Events: 12

The 2013 UCI Road World Championships was the 86th edition of the UCI Road World Championships, the annual world championships for road bicycle racing. It was held from 22 to 29 September 2013 in Tuscany, Italy. It was the first time the event took place in Tuscany, and the 13th time the event took place in Italy overall.

The Championships consisted of 12 events for elite, under-23 and junior cyclists. The different events finished near the Nelson Mandela Forum in Florence. Host cities for the starts were Florence, Pistoia, Lucca and Montecatini Terme.

== Marketing ==
Sponsors of the Championships
Main partners of the 2013 UCI Road World Championships:

- Mapei
- Generali

Other partners:

- Tissot
- Tacx
- BMW
- Limar helmets
- Conad
- La Nazione
- Shimano
- Aquasilva
- Ricoh
- Lilly
- Terra Group
- Santini SMS
- Skoda
- Corriere dello Sport
- Enel
- Sebach
- Stylgrafix
- Chianti Classico
- Giorgio Tesi
- Gassexpress
- Prestigio
- Golden View

Tickets for crucial points of the course in Florence and Fiesole could be bought in advance. Ticket prices ranged from 20 Euro to 100 Euro for seating near the finish line of the men's road race. Related to the Championships, many events were organized including expositions, exhibitions, a cyclosportive, and the Bicycle Film Festival. Poste italiane made a stamp dedicated to the Championships in 3.290,000 pieces and Chianti Classico produced wine bottles with special Championships labels.

=== Mascot Pinocchio ===
The organizers showed the mascot for the event, Pinocchio the brainchild of Florentine writer Carlo Collodi, on 26 October 2012. The wooden figure is dressed in a rainbow sweater and a hat with the same motif. The choice of Pinocchio, whose nose grows when he lies, appeared to be significant after the cycling world was rocked by the doping case of Lance Armstrong. The decision for the mascot however, was taken much earlier according to the organizers.

=== Traveling ===
To promote the public transport, more trains ran during the Championships to Florence and a special ticket was produced to ride on all regional trains. For safety reasons, all schools in Fiesole were closed on 27 and 28 September, because reaching schools was complicated.

== Schedule ==
Host cities in Tuscany

Date	Timings		Event	Distance	Start	Finish
Team time trial events
22 September	10:00	11:35	Women's teams	42.79 km (26.59 mi)	Pistoia	Florence (Nelson Mandela Forum)
22 September	14:00	17:10	Men's teams	57.20 km (35.54 mi)	Montecatini	Florence (Nelson Mandela Forum)
Individual time trial events
23 September	10:00	11:25	Junior women	16.27 km (10.11 mi)	Florence (Parco delle Cascine)	Florence (Nelson Mandela Forum)
23 September	14:00	16:35	Under-23 men	43.49 km (27.02 mi)	Pistoia	Florence (Nelson Mandela Forum)
24 September	10:00	12:15	Junior men	22.05 km (13.70 mi)	Florence (Parco delle Cascine)	Florence (Nelson Mandela Forum)
24 September	14:30	16:30	Elite women	22.05 km (13.70 mi)	Florence (Parco delle Cascine)	Florence (Nelson Mandela Forum)
25 September	13:15	16:40	Elite men	57.90 km (35.98 mi)	Montecatini	Florence (Nelson Mandela Forum)
Road race events
27 September	08:30	10:50	Junior women	82.85 km (51.48 mi)	Florence (Nelson Mandela Forum)	Florence (Nelson Mandela Forum)
27 September	13:00	17:20	Under-23 men	173.19 km (107.62 mi)	Montecatini	Florence (Nelson Mandela Forum)
28 September	08:30	12:05	Junior men	140.05 km (87.02 mi)	Montecatini	Florence (Nelson Mandela Forum)
28 September	14:10	17:50	Elite women	140.05 km (87.02 mi)	Montecatini	Florence (Nelson Mandela Forum)
29 September	10:00	16:45	Elite men	272.26 km (169.17 mi)	Lucca	Florence (Nelson Mandela Forum)

== Events summary ==
=== Elite events ===
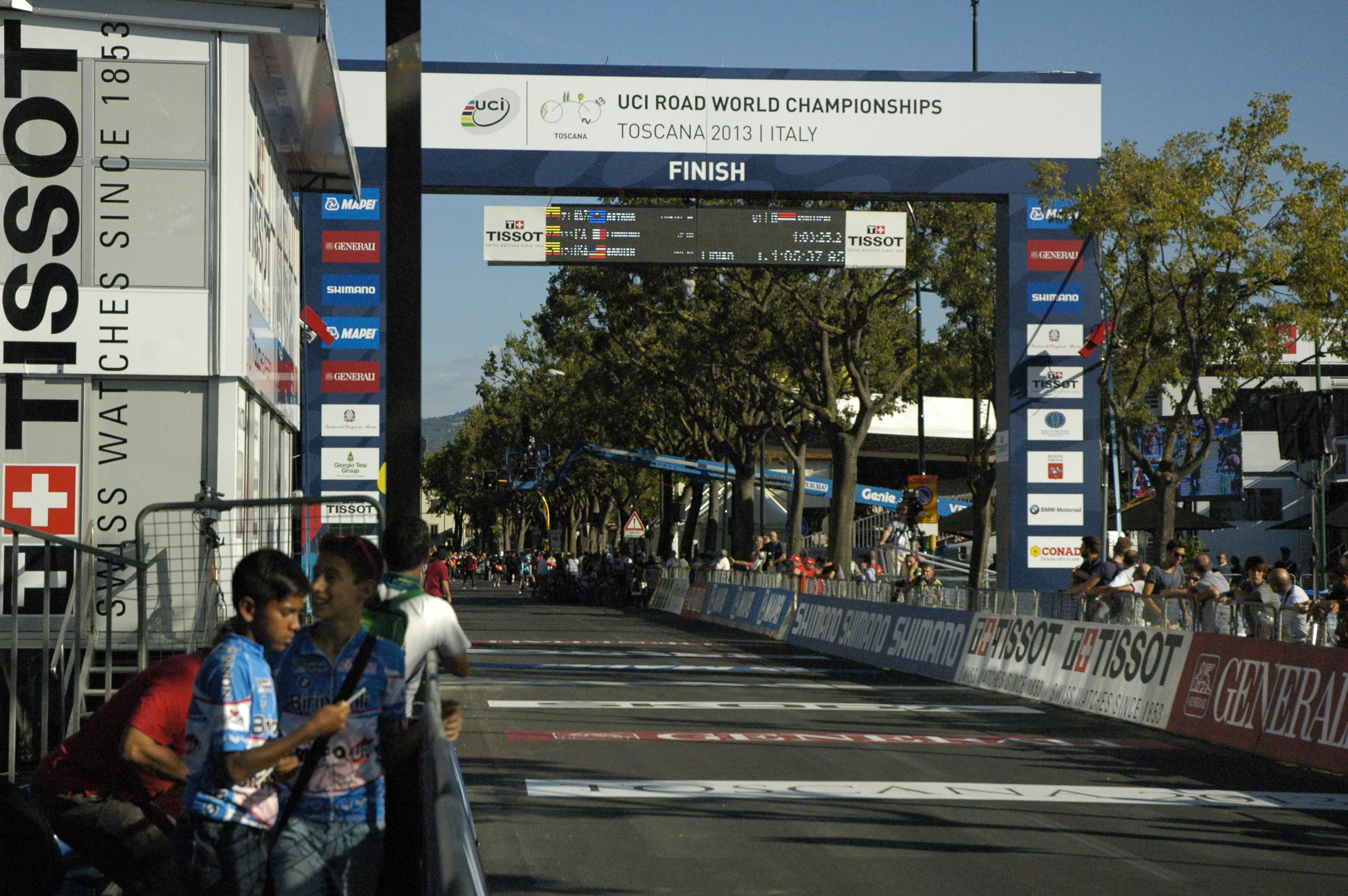
The finish of all events

On the first day, the team time trial events were for the second consecutive year won by Specialized–lululemon (women) and Omega Pharma–Quick-Step (men). The men's squad's victory in the men's team time trial came by 0.81 seconds over Orica–GreenEDGE. Ellen van Dijk from the Netherlands, who won a gold medal in the women's team time trial, won her second gold medal in the women's time trial. Van Dijk won with an advantage of 24 seconds over Linda Villumsen, who finished on the podium for the fourth successive Championships. Van Dijk became the second Dutch woman to win in the discipline, after Leontien van Moorsel's victories in 1998 and 1999. Tony Martin, who also won with his team a gold medal in the team time trial, won his third successive men's time trial gold medal, beating main rivals Bradley Wiggins and Fabian Cancellara. In the last weekend of the championships, Marianne Vos won her third gold and her eighth medal in the women's road race. With help from Anna van der Breggen who helped close down the breakaway attempts, Vos made her break on the final ascent of the 600 m (2,000 ft) long Via Salviati – with around 5 km (3.1 mi) to go – and soloed to a 15-second victory over Emma Johansson and Rossella Ratto. On the last day of the Championships, Rui Costa from Portugal won the rain-soaked Men's road race as he beat Spain's Joaquim Rodríguez by a bike-length on the finish line, with Alejandro Valverde from Spain taking bronze.

Event	Gold		Silver		Bronze	
Men's events
Men's road race	(Portugal) Rui Costa (POR)	7h 25' 44"	(Spain) Joaquim Rodríguez (ESP)	s.t.	(Spain) Alejandro Valverde (ESP)	+ 15"
Men's time trial	(Germany) Tony Martin (GER)	1h 05' 36.65"	(United Kingdom) Bradley Wiggins (GBR)	+ 46.09"	(Switzerland) Fabian Cancellara (SUI)	+ 48.34"
Men's team time trial	(Belgium) Omega Pharma–Quick-Step	1h 04' 16.81"	(Australia) Orica–GreenEDGE	+ 0.81"	(United Kingdom) Team Sky	+ 22.55"
Men's team time trial	(France) Sylvain Chavanel (FRA) (Poland) Michał Kwiatkowski (POL) (Germany) Tony Martin (GER) (Netherlands) Niki Terpstra (NED) (Belgium) Kristof Vandewalle (BEL) (Slovakia) Peter Velits (SVK)	1h 04' 16.81"	(Australia) Luke Durbridge (AUS) (Australia) Michael Hepburn (AUS) (South Africa) Daryl Impey (RSA) (Australia) Brett Lancaster (AUS) (Netherlands) Jens Mouris (NED) (Canada) Svein Tuft (CAN)	+ 0.81"	(Norway) Edvald Boasson Hagen (NOR) (United Kingdom) Chris Froome (GBR) (Belarus) Vasil Kiryienka (BLR) (Australia) Richie Porte (AUS) (Belarus) Kanstantsin Sivtsov (BLR) (United Kingdom) Geraint Thomas (GBR)	+ 22.55"
Women's events
Women's road race	(Netherlands) Marianne Vos (NED)	3h 44' 00"	(Sweden) Emma Johansson (SWE)	+ 15"	(Italy) Rossella Ratto (ITA)	+ 15"
Women's time trial	(Netherlands) Ellen van Dijk (NED)	27' 48.18"	(New Zealand) Linda Villumsen (NZL)	+ 24.10"	(United States) Carmen Small (USA)	+ 28.74"
Women's team time trial	(United States) Specialized–lululemon	51' 10.69"	(Netherlands) Rabobank-Liv Giant	+ 1' 11.09"	(Australia) Orica–AIS	+ 1' 33.83"
Women's team time trial	(Germany) Lisa Brennauer (GER) (United Kingdom) Katie Colclough (GBR) (United States) Carmen Small (USA) (United States) Evelyn Stevens (USA) (Netherlands) Ellen van Dijk (NED) (Germany) Trixi Worrack (GER)	51' 10.69"	(Netherlands) Lucinda Brand (NED) (Netherlands) Thalita de Jong (NED) (France) Pauline Ferrand-Prévot (FRA) (Netherlands) Roxane Knetemann (NED) (Netherlands) Annemiek van Vleuten (NED) (Netherlands) Marianne Vos (NED)	+ 1' 11.09"	(Australia) Annette Edmondson (AUS) (Australia) Shara Gillow (AUS) (Netherlands) Loes Gunnewijk (NED) (Australia) Melissa Hoskins (AUS) (Sweden) Emma Johansson (SWE) (Australia) Amanda Spratt (AUS)	+ 1' 33.83"

=== Under-23 events ===
Event	Gold		Silver		Bronze	
Men's Under-23 Events
Men's under-23 road race	(Slovenia) Matej Mohorič (SLO)	4h 20' 18"	(South Africa) Louis Meintjes (RSA)	+ 3"	(Norway) Sondre Holst Enger (NOR)	+ 10"
Men's under-23 time trial	(Australia) Damien Howson (AUS)	49' 49.97"	(France) Yoann Paillot (FRA)	+ 57.11"	(Denmark) Lasse Norman Hansen (DEN)	+ 1' 10.13"

=== Junior events ===
After winning the women's junior time trial at the European Championships, Séverine Eraud won the women's junior time trial at the Road World Championships. European runner-up Igor Decraene won the gold medal in the men's junior time trial. In the women's junior road race won Amalie Dideriksen the sprint from Alexandria Nicholls and Alexandra Manly. The three riders escaped with one other rider on the first lap. Mathieu van der Poel won the men's junior road race. He attacked in the closing stage and soloed to the finish. It was van der Poel's first road world title, having previously won two junior world titles in cyclo-cross, in 2012 and 2013.

Event	Gold		Silver		Bronze	
Men's Juniors Events
Men's junior road race	(Netherlands) Mathieu van der Poel (NED)	3h 33' 14"	(Denmark) Mads Pedersen (DEN)	+ 3"	(Albania) Iltjan Nika (ALB)	+ 3"
Men's junior time trial	(Belgium) Igor Decraene (BEL)	26' 56.83"	(Denmark) Mathias Krigbaum (DEN)	+ 8.66"	(United States) Zeke Mostov (USA)	+ 20.97"
Women's Juniors Events
Women's junior road race	(Denmark) Amalie Dideriksen (DEN)	2h 32' 23"	(Russia) Anastasiia Iakovenko (RUS)	s.t.	(Ukraine) Olena Demydova (UKR)	+ 3"
Women's junior time trial	(France) Séverine Eraud (FRA)	22' 42.63"	(Australia) Alexandria Nicholls (AUS)	+ 2.69"	(Australia) Alexandra Manly (AUS)	+ 8.17"

== Participating nations ==
76 nations participated. Two riders from Uganda were on the start list for the men's and women's time trial but did not start. One rider from Iran was registered for the women's team time trial, but did not start. The number of cyclists per nation (exclusive riders in the team time trials) is shown in parentheses.

Participating national federations
Click on a nation to go to the nations' UCI Road World Championships page
- Albania
- Algeria
- Andorra
- Argentina
- Australia (31)
- Austria
- Azerbaijan (4)
- Belarus
- Belgium (36)
- Brazil
- Bulgaria
- Canada
- Chile
- Colombia
- Costa Rica
- Croatia
- Czech Republic (18)
- Denmark
- Ecuador
- Eritrea
- Estonia
- Ethiopia (1)
- Finland
- France
- Germany
- (United Kingdom) Great Britain
- Greece
- Hong Kong
- Hungary
- (Republic of Ireland) Ireland
- Israel
- Italy
- Japan
- Jordan (2)
- Kazakhstan
- Latvia
- Lebanon (1)
- Liechtenstein (1)
- Lithuania
- Luxembourg
- (North Macedonia) Macedonia
- Malaysia
- Mexico
- Moldova
- Monaco
- Mongolia
- Morocco
- Netherlands (35)
- Norway
- New Zealand (13)
- Panama
- Paraguay (2)
- Poland
- Portugal (9)
- Qatar (1)
- Romania
- Russia
- Saint Kitts and Nevis (1)
- San Marino
- Serbia
- Slovakia (15)
- Slovenia
- Spain
- South Africa
- South Korea (2)
- Sweden
- Switzerland
- Syria (1)
- Thailand (4)
- Tunisia
- Turkmenistan
- Turkey
- Ukraine
- United States (29)
- Uzbekistan (4)
- Venezuela (9)

== Medal table ==
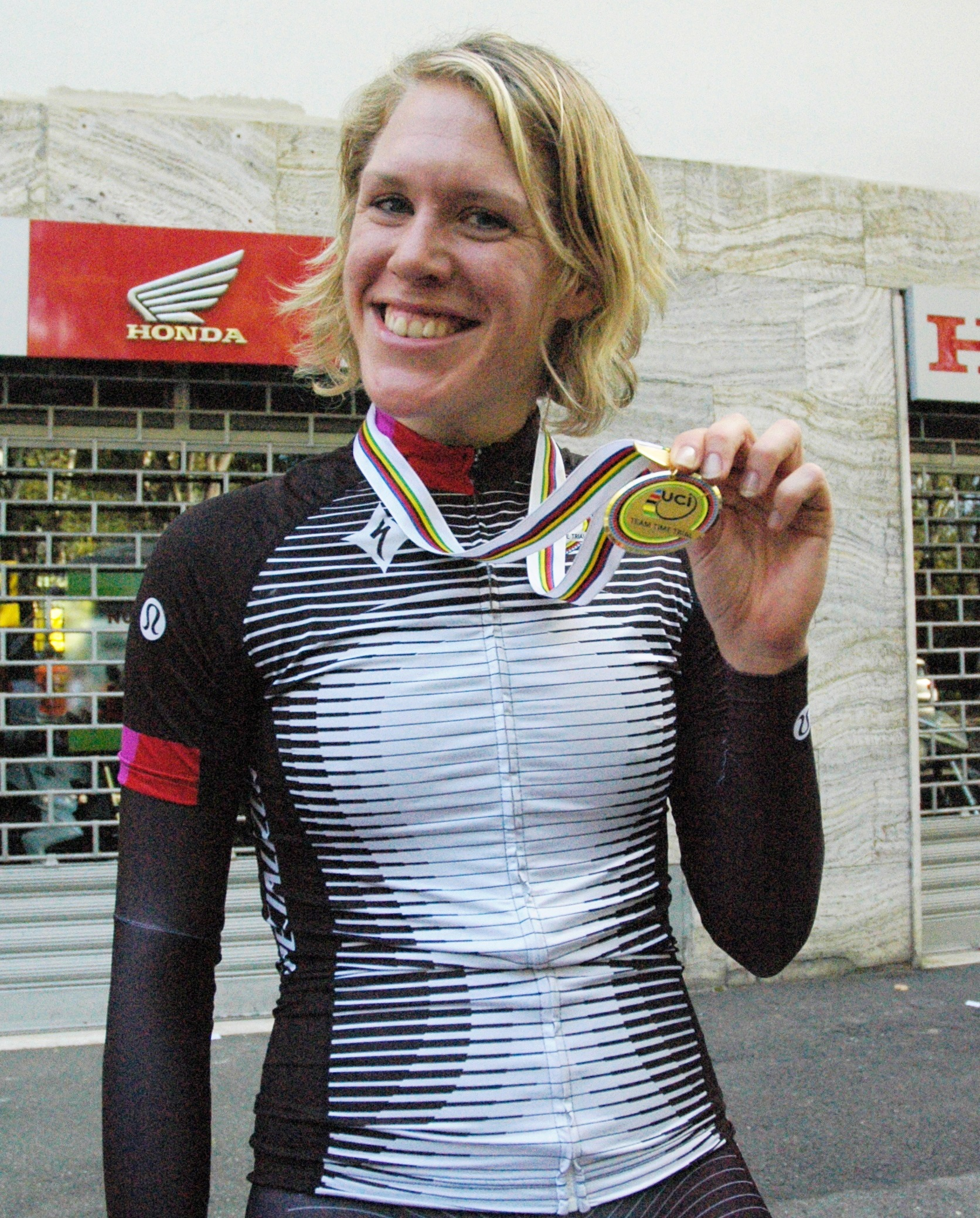
Ellen van Dijk from the Netherlands won two gold medals. She won the women's time trial and with Specialized–lululemon the women's team time trial.

Place	Nation	1st place, gold medalist(s)	2nd place, silver medalist(s)	3rd place, bronze medalist(s)	Total
1	Netherlands	3	1	0	4
2	Belgium	2	0	0	2
3	Australia	1	2	2	5
4	Denmark	1	2	1	4
5	France	1	1	0	2
6	United States	1	0	2	3
7	Germany	1	0	0	1
7	Portugal	1	0	0	1
7	Slovenia	1	0	0	1
10	Great Britain	0	1	1	2
10	Spain	0	1	1	2
12	New Zealand	0	1	0	1
12	Russia	0	1	0	1
12	South Africa	0	1	0	1
12	Sweden	0	1	0	1
16	Albania	0	0	1	1
16	Italy	0	0	1	1
16	Norway	0	0	1	1
16	Switzerland	0	0	1	1
16	Ukraine	0	0	1	1
Total		12	12	12	36

Team time trials are included under the UCI registration country of the team.

== Prize money ==
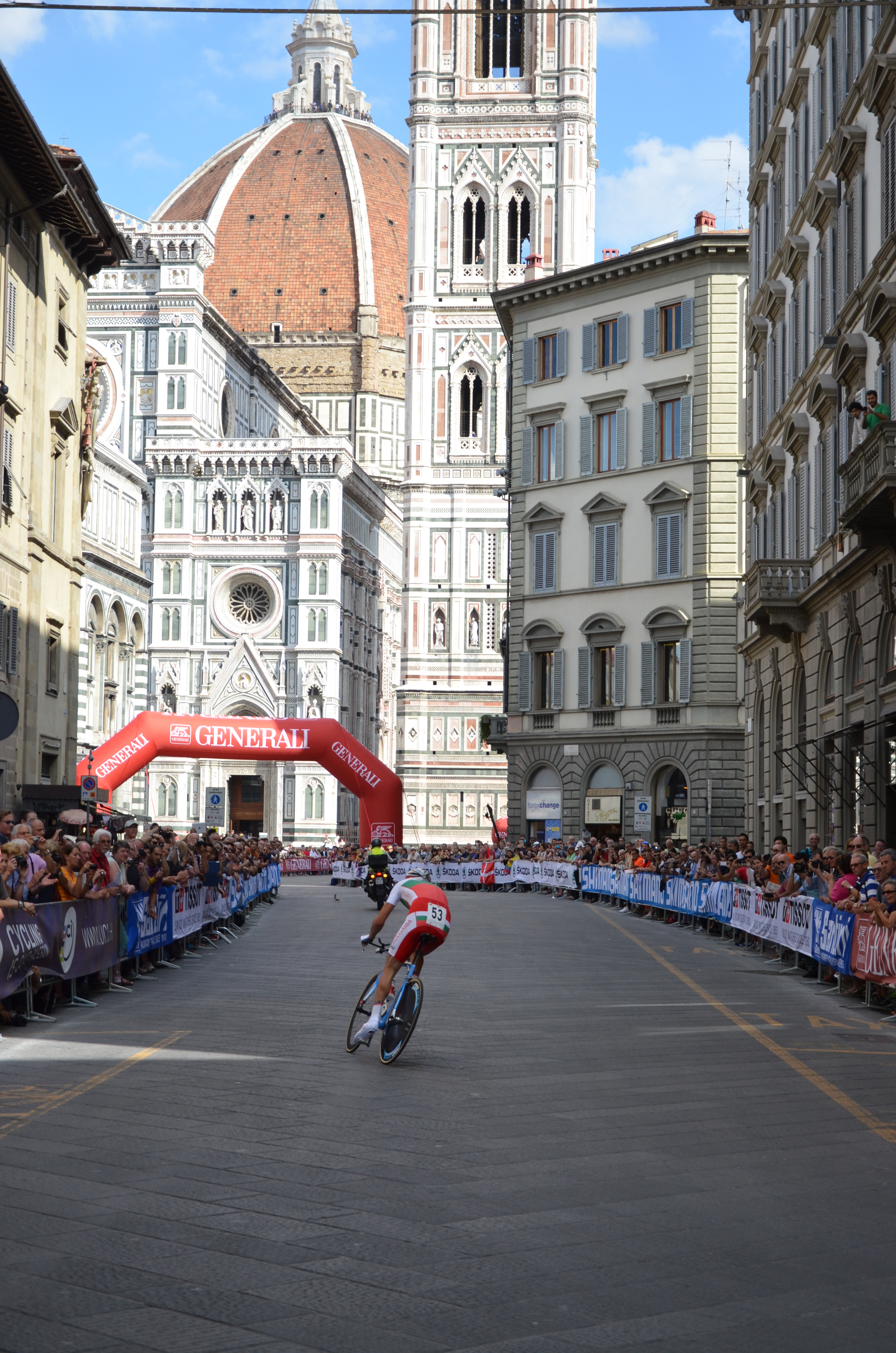
2013 UCI Road World Championships

The UCI assigned premiums in all of the twelve events.

	Rank	Men elites	Women elites	Men U23	Men juniors	Women juniors	Total
Road races	1	€7,667	€7,667	€3,833	€1,533	€1,533	€22,233
Road races	2	€5,367	€5,367	€2,683	€1,150	€1,150	€15,717
Road races	3	€3,067	€3,067	€1,533	€767	€767	€9,201
Road races	Total	€16,101	€16,101	€8,049	€3,450	€3,450	€47,151
Time trials	1	€3,833	€3,833	€3,067	€767	€767	€12,267
Time trials	2	€2,300	€2,300	€1,533	€383	€383	€6,899
Time trials	3	€1,633	€1,633	€767	€230	€230	€4,493
Time trials	Total	€7,766	€7,766	€5,367	€1,380	€1,380	€23,659
Team time trials	1	€33,333	€10,666	N/A			€43,999
Team time trials	2	€20,833	€6,666	N/A			€27,499
Team time trials	3	€16,666	€4,166	N/A			€20,832
Team time trials	4	€8,333	€2,500	N/A			€10,833
Team time trials	5	€4,166	€1,666	N/A			€5,832
Team time trials	Total	€83,331	€25,664	N/A			€108,995
Total		€107,198	€49,531	€13,416	€4,830	€4,830	€179,805

== Broadcasting ==
- Australia: SBS 2 (Internet Broadcast)
- Belgium: Canvas, Eén, La Deux
- Brazil: SporTV
- Canada: Rogers Sportsnet, RDS
- China: CCTV
- Colombia: RCN, Win Sports
- Czech Republic: ČT Sport
- Denmark: TV3+, TV3 Sport 1 (Internet Broadcast)
- France: France 3, beIN Sport
- Hungary: Sport 1
- Israel: Sport 1
- Italy: Rai Sport 2, Rai 3
- Middle East: Al Jazeera
- Japan: NHK BS 1, NHK
- Netherlands: NOS
- Norway: Viasat 4, Viasat Sport
- Pan Asia: Eurosport Asia/Pacific
- Poland: Polsat Sport
- Slovakia: Dvojka
- Slovenia: RTV Slovenia
- South Africa: SuperSport
- South America: Direct TV, TDN
- Sweden: TV10 / Viasat Sport, Viasat 14 HD
- Switzerland: RSI, RTS, SRF
- United Kingdom: BBC Television (Internet Broadcast)
- United States: Universal Sports (Internet Broadcast)
- Worldwide: UCI YouTube channel (Internet Broadcast)
