= 2014 European Road Championships – Women's under-23 time trial =

Women's under-23 time trial
2014 European Road Championships
- UEC European Champion jersey

Race details
- Dates: 10 July 2014 in (Switzerland) Nyon (SUI)
- Stages: 1
- Distance: 26.9 km (16.71 mi)
- Winning time: 40' 17.84"

The Women's under-23 time trial at the 2014 European Road Championships took place on 18 July. The Championships were hosted by the Swiss municipality of Nyon. The course was 26.9 km long, and 28 cyclists competed in the time trial.

== Top 10 final classification ==
Rank	Rider	Time
1st place, gold medalist(s)	Mieke Kröger (GER)	40' 17.84"
2nd place, silver medalist(s)	Séverine Eraud (FRA)	+ 3.04"
3rd place, bronze medalist(s)	Ramona Forchini (SUI)	+ 4.94"
4	Thalita de Jong (NED)	+ 16.75"
5	Linda Indergand (SUI)	+ 24.41"
6	Susanna Zorzi (ITA)	+ 28.63"
7	Kseniya Dobrynina (RUS)	+ 40.61"
8	Rossella Ratto (ITA)	+ 42.70"
9	Annabelle Dreville (FRA)	+ 51.93"
10	Gulnaz Badykova (RUS)	+ 1' 15.66"

== See also ==
- 2014 European Road Championships – Women's under-23 road race
