= 2015 Gent–Wevelgem (women's race) =

Race details
- Dates: 29 March 2015
- Distance: 116 km (72 mi)
- Winning time: 3h 15' 12"

Results
	Winner	Floortje Mackaij (NED)	(Team Liv–Plantur)
	Second	Janneke Ensing (NED)	(Parkhotel Valkenburg Continental Team)
	Third	Chloe Hosking (AUS)	(Wiggle–Honda)

The 2015 Gent–Wevelgem in Flanders Fields was a women's one-day road cycling race held in Belgium on 29 March 2015. The race was rated as a 1.2 category race, and was won by Dutch rider Floortje Mackaij. Mackaij escaped in the last three kilometres from a front group of three riders and was not pulled back by the others. Janneke Ensing was second ahead of Chloe Hosking, while Jolien D'Hoore won the sprint for fourth.

== Results ==
Result
Rank	Rider	Team	Time
1	Floortje Mackaij (NED)	Team Liv–Plantur	3h 15' 12"
2	Janneke Ensing (NED)	Parkhotel Valkenburg Continental Team	+ 7"
3	Chloe Hosking (AUS)	Wiggle–Honda	+ 7"
4	Jolien D'Hoore (BEL)	Wiggle–Honda	+ 24"
5	Amy Pieters (NED)	Team Liv–Plantur	+ 24"
6	Roxane Knetemann (NED)	Rabobank-Liv Woman Cycling Team	+ 24"
7	Natalie van Gogh (NED)	Parkhotel Valkenburg Continental Team	+ 24"
8	Iris Slappendel (NED)	Bigla Pro Cycling Team	+ 24"
9	Susanna Zorzi (ITA)	Lotto–Soudal Ladies	+ 24"
10	Moniek Tenniglo (NED)	Rabobank-Liv Woman Cycling Team	+ 1' 31"

== See also ==
- 2015 in women's road cycling
