= Alexandra Manly =

Australian cyclist (born 1996)

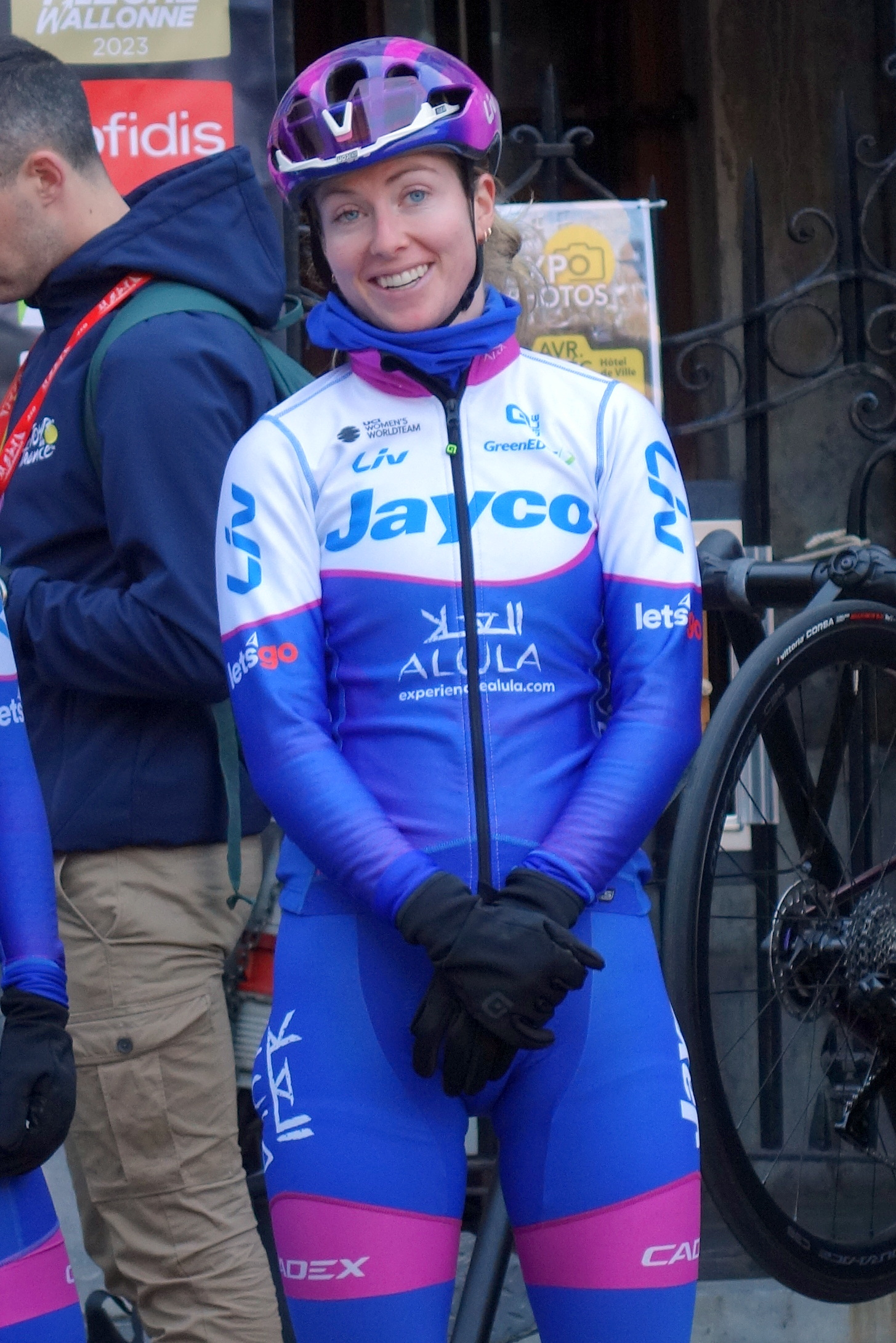
- Manly at the 2023 La Flèche Wallonne

Personal information
- Full name: Alexandra Manly
- Nicknames: Alex; Mumbles
- Born: 28 February 1996 (age 30) Kalgoorlie, Western Australia
- Height: 1.63 m (5 ft 4 in)
- Weight: 53 kg (117 lb)

Cycling career
- Sport: Cycling
- Current team: AG Insurance–Soudal
- Disciplines: Road; Track
- Role: Rider
- Rider type: Puncheur (road); Endurance (track)

Amateur team
- 2020–2021: Central Districts CC

Professional teams
- 2015–2019: Mitchelton–Scott
- 2022–2024: Liv AlUla Jayco
- 2025–: AG Insurance–Soudal
Medal record
Representing Australia
Women's track cycling
World Championships
Gold medal – first place	2019 Pruszków	Points race
Gold medal – first place	2019 Pruszków	Team pursuit
Silver medal – second place	2017 Hong Kong	Team pursuit
Silver medal – second place	2023 Glasgow	Madison
Bronze medal – third place	2017 Hong Kong	Madison
Commonwealth Games
Gold medal – first place	2018 Gold Coast	Team pursuit
Women's road bicycle racing
World Championships
Bronze medal – third place	2022 Wollongong	Mixed team relay

Alexandra Manly (born 28 February 1996) is an Australian professional racing cyclist, who currently races for UCI Women's WorldTeam AG Insurance–Soudal. She previously rode for Liv AlUla Jayco between 2015 and 2019, and then again between 2022 and 2024.

Manly qualified for the Tokyo 2020 Olympics. She was a member of the Women's pursuit team. The team, consisting of Ashlee Ankudinoff, Georgia Baker, Annette Edmondson, and Maeve Plouffe in addition to Manly, finished fifth.

Manly was born in Kalgoorlie, Western Australia, but now lives in South Australia. Before taking up cycling, Manly had previously tried basketball, cross country running, netball, hockey, tennis, javelin, and steeple chase.

== Major results ==
=== Road ===
2013
National Junior Championships

1st Time trial
3rd Road race

Oceania Junior Championships

2nd Time trial
2nd Road race

UCI Junior World Championships

3rd Time trial
8th Road race

2014
Oceania Junior Championships

1st Time trial
4th Road race

National Junior Championships

2nd Road race
3rd Time trial

4th Time trial, UCI Junior World Championships
2015
Oceania Road Championships

2nd Under-23 time trial
2nd Under-23 road race
5th Time trial
8th Road race

2017
National Under-23 Championships

1st Time trial
1st Road race

2018
National Under-23 Championships

1st Time trial
1st Road race

2022
1st Overall Thüringen Ladies Tour

1st Points classification
1st Stages 1, 3, 4 & 6

3rd Team relay, UCI Road World Championships
3rd Overall Tour of Scandinavia

1st Stage 4

4th Overall The Women's Tour
10th Brabantse Pijl
2023
1st Stage 2 Tour Down Under
2024
1st Mountains classification Vuelta a Andalucia
3rd Brabantse Pijl
3rd Road race, National Road Championships
7th Tour de Gatineau
2025
5th Surf Coast Classic
10th Schwalbe Women's One Day Classic

=== Track ===
2013
1st Team pursuit (with Samantha Fromentein & Stacey Riedel), National Junior Championships
2014
UCI Junior World Championships

1st Individual pursuit
1st Team pursuit

National Junior Championships

1st Individual pursuit
3rd Points race

3rd Team pursuit, National Championships
2015
1st Team pursuit, 2014–15 UCI Track Cycling World Cup, Cali
National Championships

2nd Team pursuit
3rd Points race

2016
1st Team pursuit, Oceania Championships
1st Madison, National Championships
2017
1st Team pursuit, National Championships
UCI World Championships

2nd Team pursuit
3rd Madison

2018
1st Team pursuit, Commonwealth Games
National Championships

1st Team pursuit
2nd Omnium
2nd Madison

2019
1st Team pursuit, UCI World Championships
1st Points race, UCI World Championships

== See also ==
- List of 2015 UCI Women's Teams and riders
