= Marta Jaskulska =

Polish cyclist (born 2000)

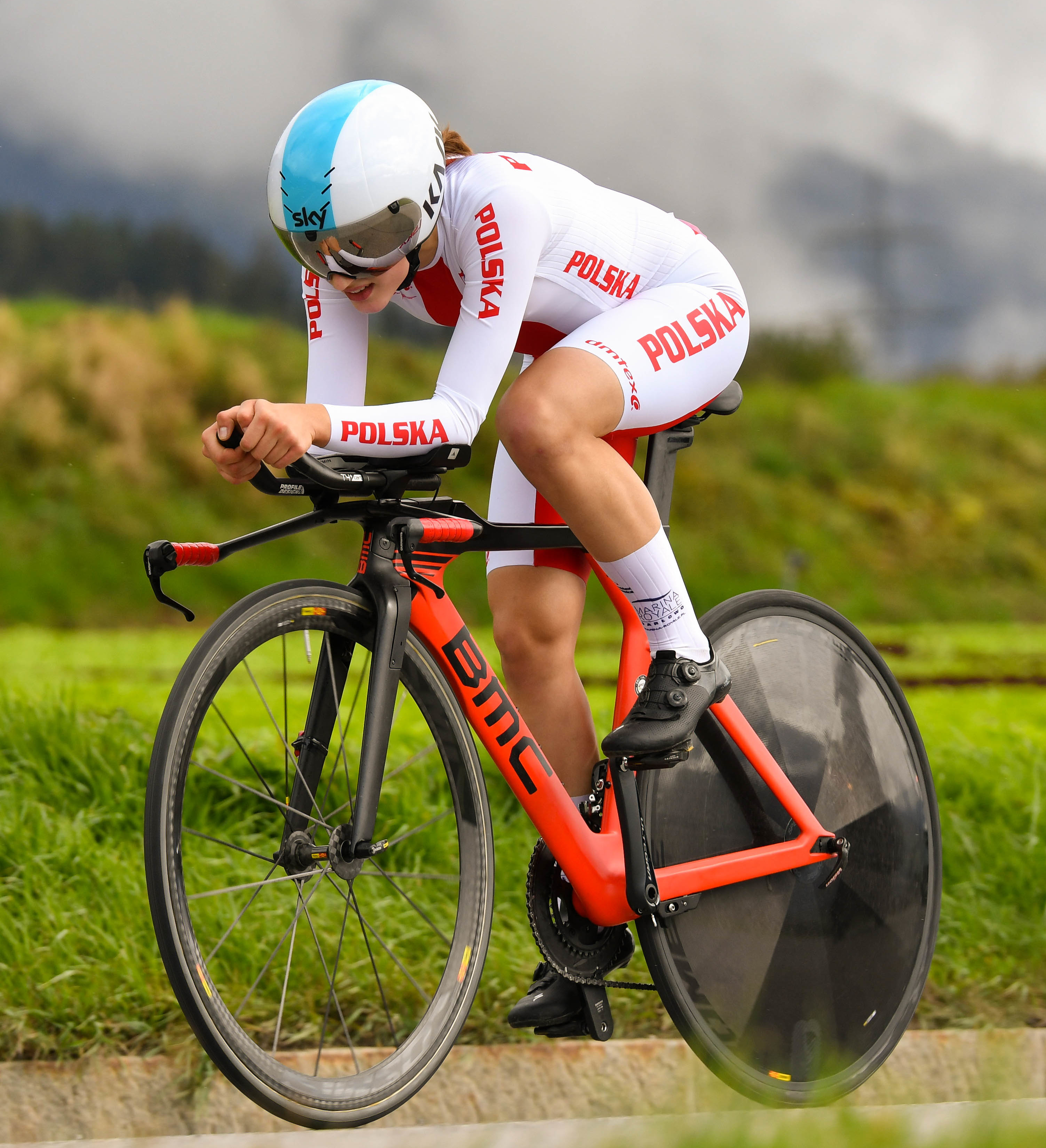
- Jaskulska at 2018 World's Championships

Personal information
- Born: 25 March 2000 (age 26)

Cycling career
- Sport: Cycling
- Current team: Ceratizit Pro Cycling
- Discipline: Road
- Role: Rider

Professional teams
- 2020–2023: Liv Racing TeqFind
- 2024–: Ceratizit–WNT Pro Cycling

Marta Jaskulska (born 25 March 2000) is a Polish professional racing cyclist, who currently rides for UCI Women's WorldTeam Ceratizit Pro Cycling. In August 2020, Jaskulska won the under-23 title at the Polish National Time Trial Championships, and the elite title in 2024.

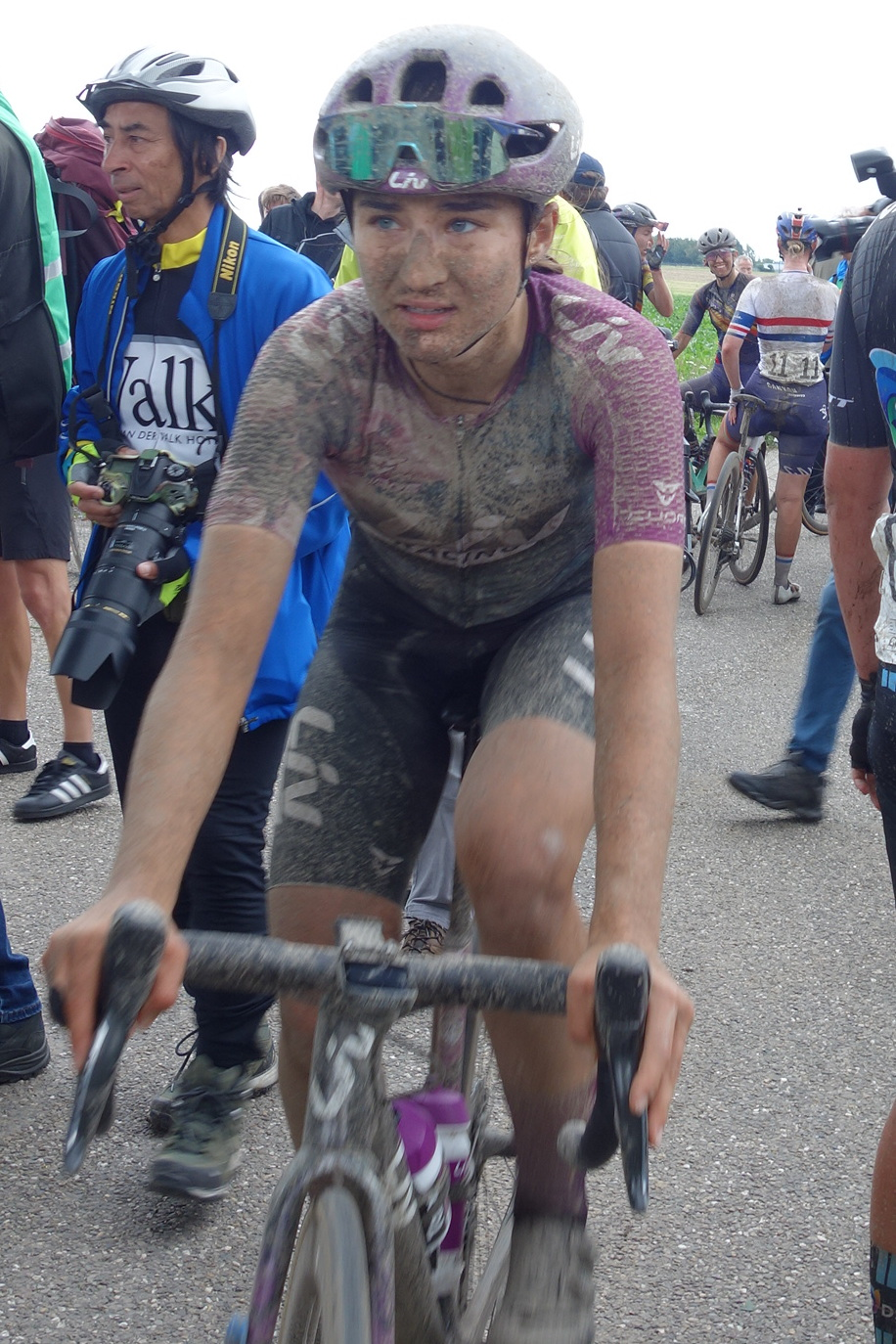
At the 2021 Holland Ladies Tour.

== Major results ==
2017
National Junior Road Championships

1st Road race
1st Time trial

7th Time trial, UEC European Junior Road Championships
7th Piccolo Trofeo Alfredo Binda
2018
National Junior Road Championships

1st Road race
1st Time trial

2nd Overall Healthy Ageing Tour Junior Women
3rd Time trial, UEC European Junior Road Championships
9th Time trial, UCI Junior Road World Championships
2020
2nd Time trial, National Road Championships
3rd Time trial, UEC European Under-23 Road Championships
2021
National Road Championships

3rd Time trial
5th Road race

4th Time trial, UEC European Under-23 Road Championships
2022
3rd Time trial, National Road Championships
7th Gran Premio Ciudad de Eibar
2023
3rd Time trial, National Road Championships
2024
National Road Championships

1st Time trial
2nd Road race

2nd Chrono Roland Bouge
3rd Kreiz Breizh Elites Féminin
3rd Chrono Gatineau
5th La Picto–Charentaise
6th Tour de Gatineau
10th Women Cycling Pro Costa De Almería
