= Annabelle Dreville =

French cyclist (born 1995)

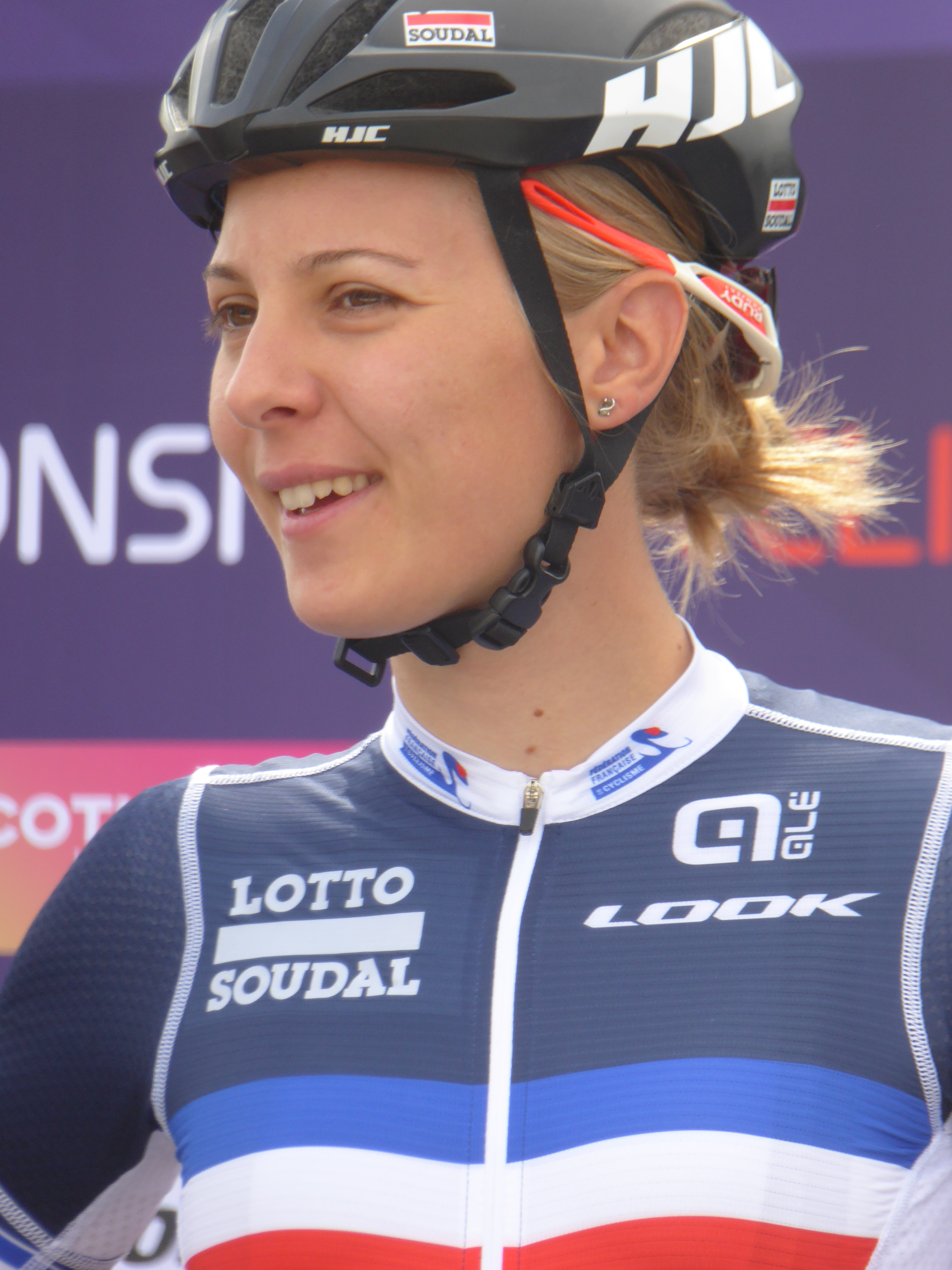
- Dreville at the 2018 European Road Cycling Championships.

Personal information
- Full name: Annabelle Dreville
- Born: 4 March 1995 (age 31) Beauvais, France

Cycling career
- Sport: Cycling
- Current team: Retired
- Discipline: Road
- Role: Rider

Amateur team
- 2015: Region Nord Pas-de-Calais

Professional teams
- 2016–2017: Poitou-Charentes.Futuroscope.86
- 2018: Lotto–Soudal Ladies

Annabelle Dreville (born 4 March 1995) is a French former professional road racing cyclist, who rode professionally between 2016 and 2018 for UCI Women's Teams FDJ Nouvelle-Aquitaine Futuroscope and Lotto–Soudal Ladies. She won a bronze medal in the under-23 road race at the 2014 European Road Championships. Dreville represented her country in the time trial and road race at the 2015 European Games in Baku, Azerbaijan.

== Major results ==
2014
UEC European Under-23 Road Championships

3rd Road race
9th Time trial

7th Chrono des Nations
2015
9th Overall Gracia–Orlová
2018
3rd Road race, National Road Championships
