= 2005 UCI Juniors Road World Championships – Women's time trial =

Women's time trial
2005 UCI Junior Road World Championships

Race details
- Dates: 12-08-2005 in (Austria) Salzburg (AUT)
- Stages: 1
- Distance: 14.00 km (8.699 mi)
- Winning time: 19' 49.66"

Medalists
	Gold	Lisa Brennauer (GER)	(Germany)
	Silver	Tereza Huřiková (CZE)	(Czech Republic)
	Bronze	Mie Lacota (DEN)	(Denmark)

The women's time trial of the 2005 Junior Road World Championships cycling event took place on 12 August in Salzburg, Austria. The race was 14.00 km long and 44 cyclists participated in the race.

== Final classification (top 10) ==
Rank	Rider	Time
1st place, gold medalist(s)	Lisa Brennauer (GER)	19' 49.66"
2nd place, silver medalist(s)	Tereza Huřiková (CZE)	+ 11.61"
3rd place, bronze medalist(s)	Mie Lacota (DEN)	+ 18.77"
4	Lesya Kalytovska (UKR)	+ 11' 61"
5	Alexandra Sontheimer (GER)	+ 22.07"
6	Aušrinė Trebaitė (LTU)	+ 23.96"
7	Ellen van Dijk (NED)	+ 25.69"
8	Alexandra Burchenkova (RUS)	+ 28.78"
9	Aleksandra Dawidowicz (POL)	+ 29.43"
10	Amanda Spratt (AUS)	+ 38.08"

Results from cyclingarchives.com

== See also ==
- 2005 UCI Juniors Road World Championships – Women's road race
- 2013 UCI Road World Championships – Women's junior time trial
