= 2014 European Road Championships – Women's under-23 road race =

Women's under-23 road race
2014 European Road Championships
- UEC European Champion jersey

Race details
- Dates: 12 July 2014
- Stages: 1
- Distance: 129.60 km (80.53 mi)
- Winning time: 3h 32' 35"

Medalists
	Gold	Sabrina Stultiens (Netherlands)
	Silver	Elena Cecchini (Italy)
	Bronze	Annabelle Dreville (France)

The Women's under-23 road race at the 2014 European Road Championships took place in Nyon, Switzerland on 12 July over a course of 129.6 km.

== Race ==
The breakaway of three riders, with Sabrina Stultiens, Elena Cecchini and Annabelle Dreville, were not caught by the bunch and sprinted for the European title. Dutchwomen Stultiens was the fastest of the three and won the second gold medal for the Netherlands at the 2014 European Road Championships ahead of Checchini and Dreville. Thalita de Jong from the Netherlands won the sprint of the peloton behind them.

== Top 10 final classification ==
Rank	Rider	Time
1st place, gold medalist(s)	Sabrina Stultiens (NED)	3h 35' 00"
2nd place, silver medalist(s)	Elena Cecchini (ITA)	+ 0"
3rd place, bronze medalist(s)	Annabelle Dreville (FRA)	+ 0"
4	Thalita de Jong (NED)	+ 41"
5	Anouska Koster (NED)	+ 41"
6	Linda Indergand (SUI)	+ 41"
7	Floortje Mackaij (NED)	+ 41"
8	Charlotte Bravard (FRA)	+ 41"
9	Aleksandra Chekina (RUS)	+ 41"
10	Rossella Ratto (ITA)	+ 41"

== See also ==
- 2014 European Road Championships – Women's under-23 time trial
