= Séverine Eraud =

French cyclist (born 1995)

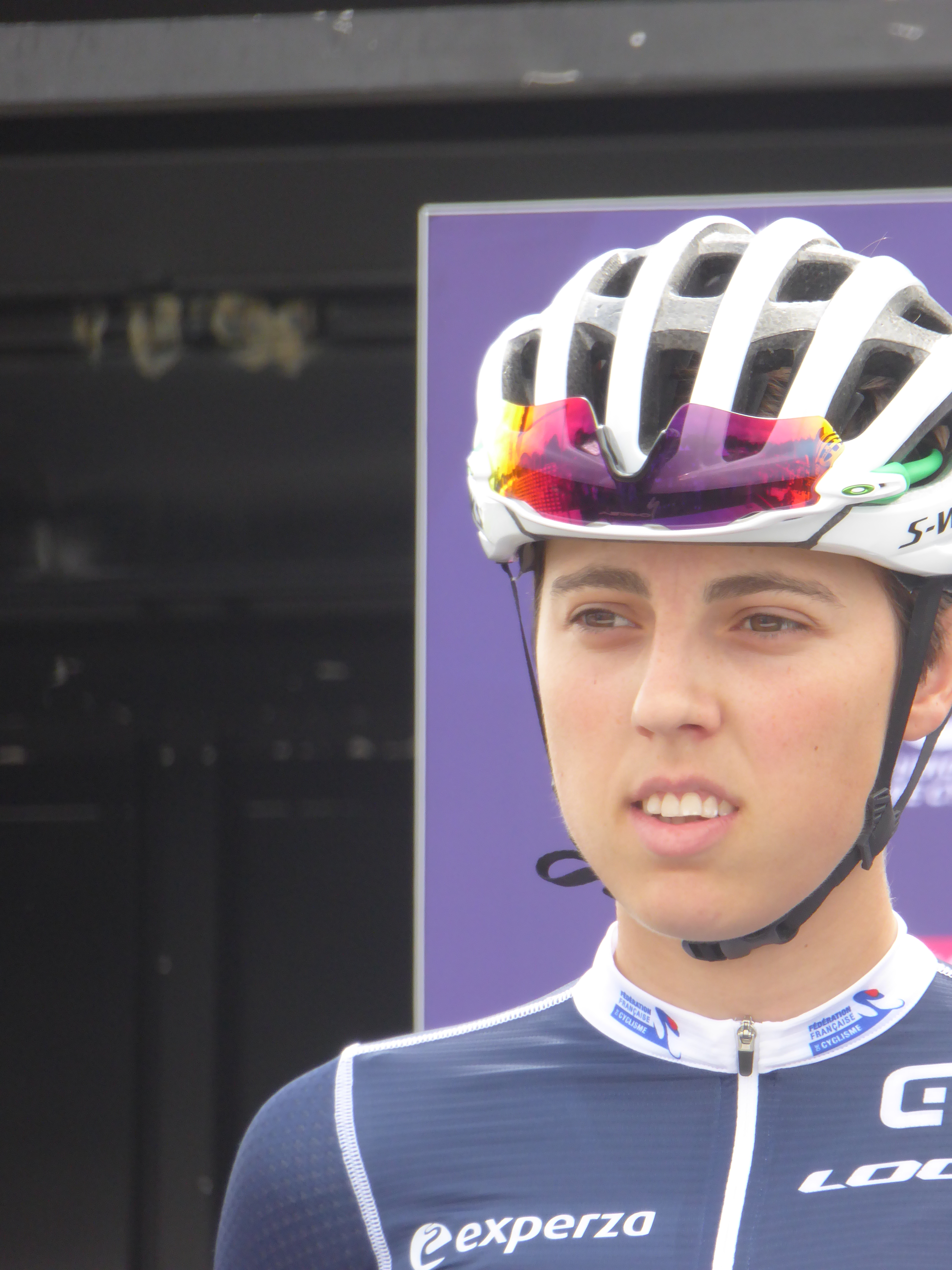
- Eraud at the 2018 European Road Cycling Championships.

Personal information
- Full name: Séverine Eraud
- Born: 24 February 1995 (age 31) Châteaubriant, France
- Height: 1.69 m (5 ft 7 in)

Cycling career
- Sport: Cycling
- Current team: Cofidis
- Discipline: Road
- Role: Rider
- Rider type: Rouleur

Professional teams
- 2015–2017: Poitou-Charentes.Futuroscope.86
- 2018: Experza–Footlogix
- 2019: Doltcini–Van Eyck Sport
- 2020–2022: Charente-Maritime Women Cycling
- 2023-2024: Cofidis
- 2025: St. Michel–Preference Home–Auber93

Séverine Eraud (born 24 February 1995) is a former French racing cyclist, who last rode for UCI Women's ProTeam St. Michel–Preference Home–Auber93. She became junior world champion in the time trial at the 2013 UCI Road World Championships as well as European champion in the time trial at the 2013 European Road Championships.

== Major results ==
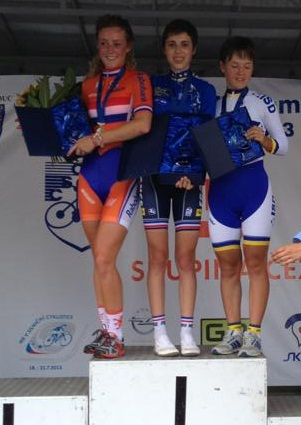
Eraud won the women's junior time trial at the 2013 European Road Championships ahead of Floortje Mackaij and Olena Demidova

2012
1st Time trial, National Junior Road Championships
2013
UCI Junior Road World Championships

1st Time trial
7th Road race

UEC European Junior Road Championships

1st Time trial
2nd Road race

National Junior Road Championships

1st Time trial
2nd Road race

1st Chrono des Nations (junior)
2014
2nd Time trial, UEC European Under-23 Road Championships
3rd Time trial, National Under-23 Road Championships
2015
National Under-23 Road Championships

2nd Road race
2nd Time trial

5th Overall Tour Cycliste Féminin International de l'Ardèche
6th Overall Tour de Feminin-O cenu Českého Švýcarska

1st Young rider classification

2016
National Under-23 Road Championships

1st Time trial
3rd Road race

UEC European Road Championships

3rd Under-23 road race
9th Under-23 time trial
10th Road race

9th Chrono des Nations
2017
National Road Championships

1st Under-23 time trial
2nd Time trial

5th Time trial, UEC European Under-23 Road Championships
7th Overall Tour de Feminin-O cenu Českého Švýcarska

1st Young rider classification

2018
1st Flanders Ladies Classic
3rd Time trial, National Road Championships
2019
1st Time trial, Military World Games
1st Time trial, National Road Championships
5th Overall Tour de Feminin-O cenu Českého Švýcarska
6th Overall Tour de Bretagne Féminin
2020
7th Vuelta a la Comunitat Valenciana Feminas
2022
5th La Classique Morbihan
