= 2013 European Road Championships – Women's junior time trial =

Women's junior time trial
2013 European Road Championships
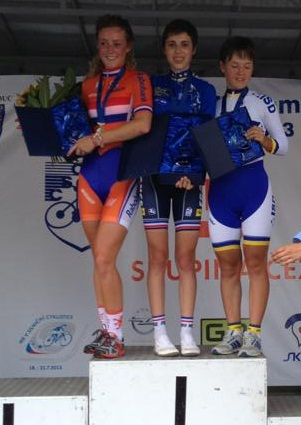
- Podium: Séverine Eraud (1), Floortje Mackaij (2) and Olena Demidova (3)

Race details
- Dates: 19 July 2013 in (Czech Republic) Olomouc (CZE)
- Stages: 1
- Distance: 13.2 km (8.202 mi)
- Winning time: 20' 48.33"

Results
	Winner	Séverine Eraud (France)
	Second	Floortje Mackaij (Netherlands)
	Third	Olena Demidova (Ukraine)

The Women's junior time trial at the 2013 European Road Championships took place on 19 July. The Championships were hosted by the Czech Republic city of Olomouc. The course was 13.2 km long. 39 junior cyclists competed in this discipline.

== Top 10 final classification ==
Rank	Rider	Time
1st place, gold medalist(s)	Séverine Eraud (FRA)	20' 48.33"
2nd place, silver medalist(s)	Floortje Mackaij (NED)	+ 13"
3rd place, bronze medalist(s)	Olena Demidova (UKR)	+ 15"
4	Anastaciia Akovenko (RUS)	+ 16"
5	Greta Richioud (FRA)	+ 32"
6	Nicky Zijlaard (NED)	+ 35"
7	Lotte Kopecky (BEL)	+ 39"
8	Maria Kantlyber (RUS)	+ 40"
9	Bogumila Dziuba (POL)	+ 41"
10	Amalie Dideriksen (DEN)	+ 43"

== See also ==
- 2013 European Road Championships – Women's junior road race
