= Olena Demidova =

Ukrainian track cyclist

Personal information
- Full name: Olena Ihorivna Demidova
- Born: September 10, 1995 (age 31)

Cycling career
- Sport: Cycling
- Discipline: Track cycling
- Role: Rider
Medal record
Representing Ukraine
Women's road cycling
European Championships
Bronze medal – third place	2013 Olomouc	Junior time trial

Olena Ihorivna Demidova (Ukrainian: Олена Ігорівна Демидова, born 10 September 1995) is a Ukrainian track cyclist.

== Career ==
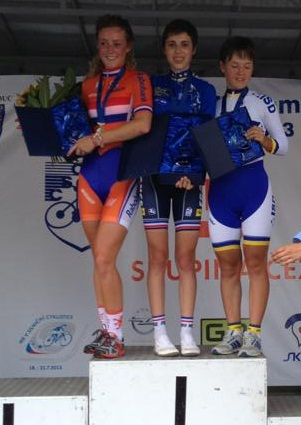
Demidova won the bronze medal of the women's junior time trial at the 2013 European Road Championships, gold for Séverine Eraud, silver for Floortje Mackaij

In 2013, Demidova won a bronze medal at the European Track Cycling Championships.

That same year, she won the team pursuit at the International Pista Cup together with Hanna Nahirna and Hanna Solovey.

In 2017, she finished second in the women's stage race at the Ukrainian National Road Championships.
