= ASBIS =

Electronics company

ASBIS Enterprises plc
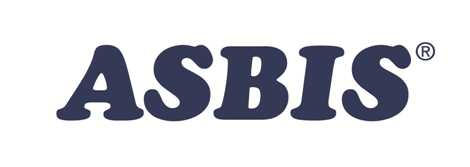
- Type: Public
- Traded as: WSE: ASB
- Industry: Electronics
- Founded: 1990; 36 years ago, in Belarus; Holding founded in 1995 in Cyprus
- Founder: Sergei Kostevitch (chairman & CEO)
- Headquarters: Limassol, Cyprus
- Number of locations: Local offices in 27 countries (2021)
- Area served: EMEA
- Products: Computers, Mobile gadgets, Computer software, Computer hardware, Accessories
- Brands: Prestigio, Canyon, Perenio, AENO, Lorgar
- Revenue: ▲US$3.1 billion (2021)
- Operating income: ▲US$113.75 million (2021)
- Net income: ▲US$77.1 million (2021)
- Number of employees: 2,000+ (2021)
- Website: www.asbis.com

ASBISC Enterprises PLC is a multinational corporate group that is engaged in distribution of IT-products (mobile devices, computer software and hardware) in Europe, Middle East and Africa (EMEA) emerging markets and is headquartered in Limassol (Cyprus).

ASBIS distributes a wide range of A-branded finished products and IT components to assemblers, system integrators, local brands, retail and wholesale companies. The company is an official distributor of world's leading brands such as Intel, Advanced Micro Devices ("AMD"), Seagate Technology, Western Digital, Samsung, Microsoft, Toshiba, Dell, Acer, Hitachi, Gigabyte, Lenovo and Apple.

The company also generates a significant part of its revenue from the sales of IT and consumer electronics products under its own brands - Prestigio, Canyon, Perenio, AENO and Lorgar.

== History ==
The company was founded in Belarus in 1990 and signed its first agreement with the global IT vendor, Seagate Technology in 1992. In 1995 the company was incorporated in Cyprus and its headquarters moved to Limassol.

As the business was growing, ASBIS was opening local offices across Europe, and in 2000 the company opened a distribution center in Prague to serve its subsidiaries and key customers in 10 countries of Central and Eastern Europe.

In 2007 the company went public by completing a successful IPO at Warsaw Stock Exchange. 36.7% of the company shares were traded in 2011.

In 2009 while coping with the consequences of the 2008 financial crisis, ASBIS signed 25 new distribution agreements, including those with Apple for Georgia and 9 countries of the Commonwealth of Independent States (CIS).

In 2011 ASBIS started to sell tablets and in 2012 smartphones under its own brand Prestigio.

ASBIS was acknowledged for its investment in the national economy of Cyprus in 2014 at the ‘CIPA International Investment Awards’ held under the auspices of the President of the Republic.

Despite the challenges of the year 2014 when the demand in its two key markets (Russia and Ukraine) decreased due to political and economic turbulence, in 2015 ASBIS already achieved strong results and was included in the Top-10 IT distributors (by revenue) in the ‘Distributors in Europe – the top 500’ database report published by IT Europa.

== Operations ==
The company's headquarters are located in Cyprus and coordinate the work of 2 logistics centers in the Czech Republic and the United Arab Emirates. Local offices in 27 countries enable the company to supply more than 20,000 customers in 56 countries.

ASBIS distributes mobile gadgets, computer software and hardware on the markets of the following countries:

- Central and Eastern Europe – Bosnia and Herzegovina, Bulgaria, Croatia, Cyprus, Czech Republic, Hungary, Poland, Romania, Serbia, Slovakia, Slovenia, Ukraine.
- Baltics – Estonia, Latvia, Lithuania
- Caucasus – Armenia, Azerbaijan, Georgia
- Central Asia – Kazakhstan
- Middle East – United Arab Emirates
- Africa – Algeria, Egypt, Morocco, South Africa, Tunisia

In 2021 the company's sales were shared between the following markets: 57.66% – CIS, 21.25% – Central and Eastern Europe, 10.65% – Middle East & Africa, 8.66% – Western Europe, 1.77% – Other.

== Brands ==
=== Prestigio ===
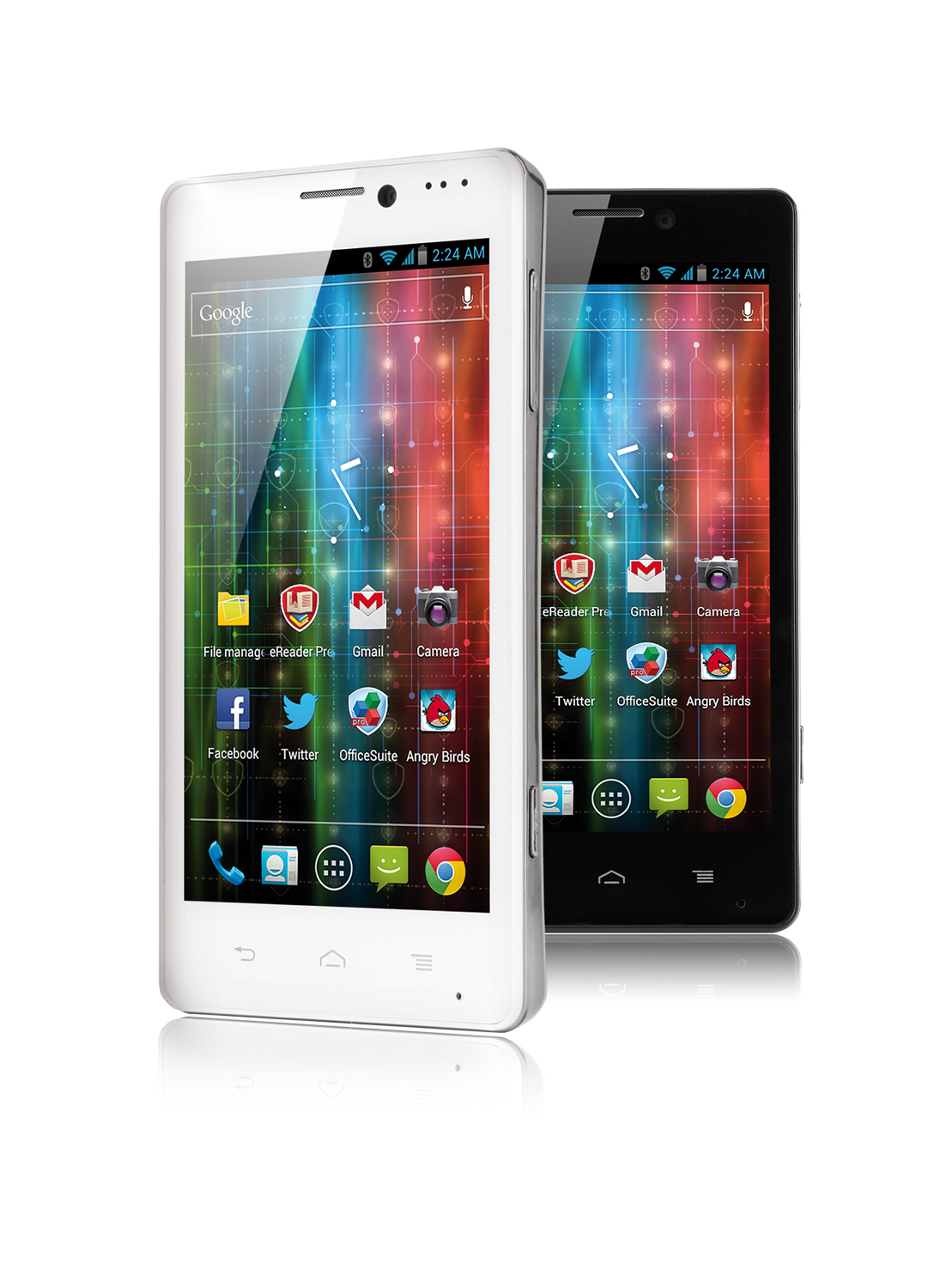
Prestigio Multiphone PAP5430

Yuri Antoshkin held the position of General Manager, Prestigio EMEA, from 2006 to October 2014. Over this decade the company's sales increased almost 30 times followed by the established cooperation with the largest Russian electronic retailers (Euroset, Eldorado, M.video and others). The Prestigio brand has become the leader in the Russian market of GPS navigation devices and has entered the top 3 of the tablet computers market in Russia. In 2011 Prestigio navigation system was ranked first in sales in Russia with a market share 28.5%.

In 2013 Prestigio introduced the first two ranges of B2B products: MultiBoard (interactive flat panel displays with Windows PCs and supporting software for meeting rooms and education) and Digital Signage (public information screens). In 2016 MultiBoard range extended with the biggest ultra high definition display with interactive touch features - MultiBoard 98" UHD.

In April 2013 ASBIS in cooperation with Intel started to develop a new smartphone under the brand Prestigio. Smartphone Prestigio MultiPhone PAP5430 with the processor Intel Atom Z2420 went on sale in August 2013.

On October 24, 2013, Prestigio and MediaTek introduced the new models of tablets based on MediaTek MT8389 processor.

In 2019, the brand launched Prestigio Click&Touch – a keyboard based on Touch On Keys technology that enables a user to control a cursor, click, scroll and zoom directly on the keyboard surface like on a traditional touchpad. The keyboard won Red Dot Awards 2020 in the Computer and Information Technology, TV and Home Entertainment, Smart Product, and Innovative Product categories. A year later, the second generation of the keyboard – Prestigio Click&Touch 2, also won the Red Dot Awards in the Computer and Information Technology category.

=== Canyon ===
The brand was established in 2003 in the Netherlands and focuses on computer and mobile accessories, gaming peripherals, and smart watches. It grew to have 16 offices across Europe and sold more than 762,000 devices in Eastern Europe in 2021.

=== Perenio ===
Launched in 2018 and located in Czech Republic, Perenio specializes in the Internet of Things, Smart Home/Office, and Smart Health. In 2021 the brand has launched an innovative anti-virus device - Perenio Ionic Shield. The device was designed to prevent infectious diseases caused by known coronaviruses and their strains - including Sars-CoV-2. The ion complex emitted by the device has sufficient kinetic energy to destroy the positively charged outer membrane of coronaviruses and their negatively charged RNA.

=== AENO ===
AENO is a brand of smart home appliances, created and manufactured in China. ASBIS announced this brand at the end of 2021 and the first product categories were released shortly afterwards.

== Financial performance ==
In 2013 the company's revenues increased by 10.06% to reach $1.92 billion. Operating income reached $31.939 million and net income grew by 40.51% to reach $12.712 million. EBITDA increased by 50.95% to reach $34.84 million. The company's revenue from the sales of private labels Prestigio and Canyon grew to a historical record of $468.988 million, and as a result of the own brand contribution, the total revenue growth was 24.42%.

In 2021, ASBIS achieved record-breaking financial results both in the fourth quarter and throughout the year. Sales revenues in 2021 exceeded the threshold of US$3 billion for the first time and amounted to nearly US$3.1 billion, compared to US$2.4 billion in 2020, an increase of 30%. Net profit during that time doubled to $77.1 million, compared to $36.5 million in 2020.
