= Floortje Mackaij =

Dutch racing cyclist

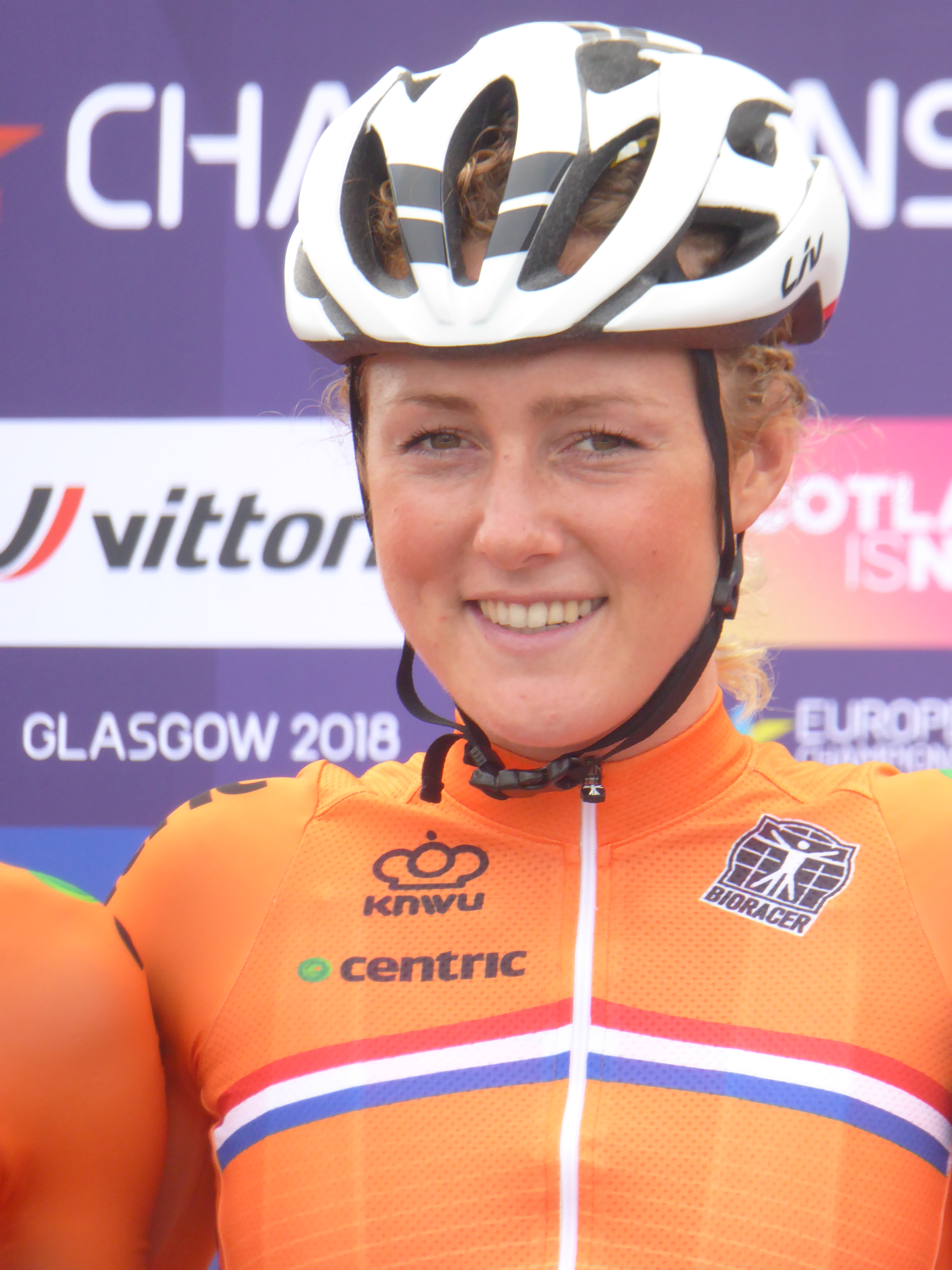
- Mackaij at the 2018 European Road Cycling Championships.

Personal information
- Full name: Floortje Mackaij
- Born: 18 October 1995 (age 30) Woerden, Netherlands

Cycling career
- Sport: Cycling
- Current team: Movistar Team
- Discipline: Road
- Role: Rider

Professional teams
- 2013–2022: Argos–Shimano
- 2023–: Movistar Team

Major wins
- Gent–Wevelgem (2015)
Medal record
Road cycling
Representing Netherlands
European Championships
| Bronze medal – third place | 2021 Trentino | Mixed team relay |

Floortje Mackaij (born 18 October 1995) is a Dutch professional road racing cyclist, who currently rides for UCI Women's WorldTeam Movistar Team.

After switching from speed skating to road cycling she became the 2013 junior Dutch National time trial Champion and won a silver medal in the junior time trial at the 2013 European Road Championships. In the same year she represented her country at the UCI Road World Championships in the junior time trial and road race.

== Personal life ==
Mackaij lives with her parents in Woerden and has one older brother. Her father, Ron Mackay, was also a professional cyclist. Mackaij graduated from the Minkema College, Woerden, in 2012 and went to the Johan Cruijff College afterwards.

== Career ==
=== Early career ===
Mackaij started her career as a speed skater. When she was seven years old she became a member of a local speed skating club. As a 'Junior C' and 'Junior B' she skated at national level and was part of the regional selection. Between 2011 and 2013 she participated every year at the Dutch Junior Championships. Her best result was 6th place as a Junior B in the 3000 metres at the Single Distance Championships in 2012. As part of her skating training she undertook cycling as part of cross-training in summer. She joined the local road cycling club and started riding official races a few years later when she was 14 years old. At the end of 2012 she joined the national selection and changed her main sport from speed skating to cycling.

=== 2013 ===
In one of the most prestigious stage races for junior riders, the Energiewacht Tour, Mackaij won one stage and the overall points classification, as she finished third in the general classification. In June she became Dutch National Time Trial Champion for juniors. A month later she won the silver medal in the time trial for junior riders at the 2013 European Road Championships and finished 21st in the road race. After training several times during the year with Argos–Shimano she joined the team in August. Mackaij was selected to ride the time trial and road race at the 2013 UCI Road World Championships where she finished 8th and 13th respectively. Mackaij was awarded the title for sport talent of Woerden of the year 2013.

=== 2014 ===
Mackaij won the Parel van de Veluwe in June. She was selected to ride the road race at the 2014 European Road Championships where she finished seventh.

=== 2015 ===
On 22 March Mackaij won the non-UCI race Rabo Koepel Race in Lierop, after riding clear from a front group. Three days later she finished second behind Amy Pieters in Dwars door Vlaanderen. She finished the week with winning Gent–Wevelgem, her first elite UCI victory. She escaped in the last three kilometres from a front group three and was not pulled back by the others.

== Career achievements ==
=== Major results ===
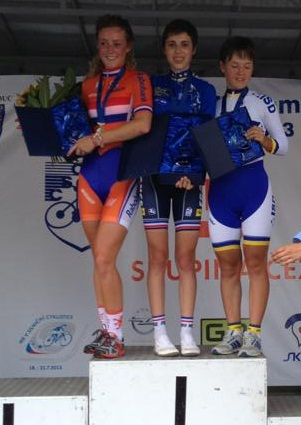
Mackaij on the podium at the 2013 European Road Championships after finishing second in the junior time trial.

2013
1st Time trial, National Junior Road Championships
2nd Time trial, UEC European Junior Road Championships
3rd Overall Energiewacht Tour (juniors)

1st Points classification
1st Stage 3

8th Time trial, UCI Junior Road World Championships
2014
1st Parel van de Veluwe
7th Road race, UEC European Under-23 Road Championships
10th Overall Belgium Tour
2015
1st Gent–Wevelgem
1st Stage 3 Belgium Tour
2nd Overall BeNe Ladies Tour

1st Young rider classification

2nd Dwars door Vlaanderen
3rd 94.7 Cycle Challenge
9th Overall Festival Luxembourgeois du cyclisme féminin Elsy Jacobs

1st Points classification
1st Mountains classification
1st Young rider classification
1st Stage 3

UEC European Under-23 Road Championships

10th Time trial
10th Road race

2016
2nd Overall BeNe Ladies Tour

1st Young rider classification

2nd Omloop van Borsele
3rd Omloop van de IJsseldelta
3rd Women's Tour de Yorkshire
4th Le Samyn des Dames
4th Diamond Tour
7th Ronde van Drenthe
8th Gooik–Geraardsbergen–Gooik
9th Overall Energiewacht Tour

1st Young rider classification

10th Overall The Women's Tour

1st Young rider classification

10th Ronde van Gelderland
2017
1st Team time trial, UCI Road World Championships
3rd Road race, National Road Championships
6th 7-Dorpenomloop Aalburg
6th Omloop van de IJsseldelta
9th Road race, UEC European Under-23 Road Championships
10th Overall Healthy Ageing Tour
2018
Ladies Tour of Norway

1st Team time trial
8th Overall Stage race

2nd Le Samyn des Dames
2nd Crescent Vårgårda TTT
3rd Dwars door Vlaanderen
6th Drentse Acht van Westerveld
8th Overall Tour de Feminin-O cenu Českého Švýcarska

1st Points classification
1st Stages 1 & 4

8th Gent–Wevelgem
8th Veenendaal–Veenendaal Classic
9th Overall Thüringen Rundfahrt der Frauen
9th Ronde van Drenthe
2019
1st Team relay, UEC European Road Championships
2nd Liège–Bastogne–Liège
3rd Postnord UCI WWT Vårgårda West Sweden TTT
5th Brabantse Pijl Dames Gooik
6th Overall Ladies Tour of Norway
7th Omloop van het Hageland
7th Ronde van Drenthe
9th Overall Madrid Challenge by la Vuelta
10th Omloop Het Nieuwsblad
2020
3rd Omloop Het Nieuwsblad
3rd Brabantse Pijl Dames Gooik
2021
1st Overall Trophée des Grimpeuses

1st Points classification
1st Stage 2

2nd Overall Kreiz Breizh Elites Dames
3rd Team relay, UEC European Road Championships
5th Ronde van Drenthe
7th Dwars door Vlaanderen
7th GP Oetingen
8th Overall Challenge by La Vuelta
10th Trofeo Alfredo Binda-Comune di Cittiglio
2022
3rd Omloop van het Hageland
3rd Drentse Acht van Westerveld
6th Paris–Roubaix
2023
1st Vuelta a la Comunitat Valenciana Feminas
6th Dwars door Vlaanderen
10th Strade Bianche

==== Championship results ====
| Event | | 2013 | 2014 | 2015 | 2016 | 2017 | 2018 | 2019 | 2020 | 2021 | 2022 | 2023 | 2024 |
|---|---|---|---|---|---|---|---|---|---|---|---|---|---|
| Olympic Games | Time trial | Not Held | | | — | Not Held | | | | — | Not Held | | — |
| Olympic Games | Road race | Not Held | | | — | Not Held | | | | — | Not Held | | — |
| World Championships | Time trial | 8 (Note: Mackaij competed in the junior race.) | — | — | — | — | — | — | — | — | — | — | |
| World Championships | Road race | 13 | — | — | — | — | — | 33 | 92 | — | 36 | — | |
| European Championships | Time trial | 2 | — | 10 (Note: Mackaij competed in the under-23 race.) | — | 27 | — | — | — | — | — | — | |
| European Championships | Road race | 21 | 7 | 10 | — | 9 | 11 | — | — | 12 | 42 | 47 | |
| European Championships | Mixed Team Relay | Not Held | | | | | | 1 | — | 3 | NH | — | |
| National Championships | Time trial | 1 | 16 | 13 | 13 | 9 | 6 | 6 | NH | 18 | — | — | — |
| National Championships | Road race | — | 9 | 17 | 9 | 3 | 14 | 7 | DNF | 10 | — | 8 | 27 |

Legend
| — | Did not compete |
| DNF | Did not finish |
| NH | Not held |

=== Speed skating records ===
Speed Skating
| Distance | Time | Date | Ice Rink |
|---|---|---|---|
| 500 meter | 42.74 | 20 December 2012 | Thialf, Heerenveen |
| 1000 meter | 1:26.16 | 2 December 2012 | De Westfries, Hoorn |
| 1500 meter | 2:06.94 | 20 December 2012 | Thialf, Heerenveen |
| 3000 meter | 4:30.35 | 27 October 2012 | Thialf, Heerenveen |
| 5000 meter | 8:03.48 | 18 March 2012 | IJsbaan Twente, Enschede |
