= Igor Decraene =

Belgian cyclist

- Decraene after winning the 2013 Junior Time Trial World Championship

Personal information
- Born: 26 January 1996 Waregem, Belgium
- Died: 30 August 2014 (aged 18) Zulte, Belgium

Cycling career
- Sport: Cycling
- Discipline: Road
- Role: Rider
- Rider type: Time trialist

Amateur team
- 2013–2014: Tieltse Rennerclub

Igor Decraene (26 January 1996, in Waregem – 30 August 2014, in Zulte) was a Belgian cyclist. In 2013, he became the UCI world junior men's time trial champion. The event took place on 24 September in Florence, Tuscany, Italy. In 2013 and 2014 he was also the Belgian national champion in the time trial for juniors men. He also won the Crystal Bicycle for Best Young Rider in 2013. At the time of his death, he was preparing to defend his junior world time trial title at the 2014 UCI Road World Championships in Ponferrada, Spain on 23 September.

Decraene, aged 18, died in an accident on 30 August 2014 near Zulte, East Flanders. Initial media reports suggested that he had taken his own life, however the family and police denied this was the case. He was riding home from a party when he was hit and killed by a train.

== Major results ==
2013
1st Time trial, UCI Junior Road World Championships
1st Time trial, National Junior Road Championships
1st Chrono des Nations Juniors
1st Stage 2a (ITT) Keizer der Juniores
2nd Time trial, UEC European Junior Road Championships
2014
1st Time trial, National Junior Road Championships
