= 2013 European Road Championships =

- Venue: Olomouc, Czech Republic
- Date(s): 18–21 July 2013
- Events: 8

The 2013 European Road Championships were held in Olomouc, Czech Republic, between 18 and 21 July 2013. The event consisted of a road race and a time trial for men and women under 23 and juniors. The championships were regulated by the European Cycling Union.

== Schedule ==
=== Individual time trial ===
Thursday 18 July 2013

- 11:00 Men Juniors, 22 km
- 15:30 Women under-23, 22 km

Friday 19 July 2013

- 11:00 Women Juniors, 18 km
- Men under-23, 34 km

=== Road race ===
Saturday 20 July 2013

- 9:30 Men Juniors, 126 km
- 13:30 Women under-23, 126 km

Sunday 21 July 2013

- 10:00 Men under-23, 165 km
- 15:00 Women Juniors, 75 km

== Events summary ==
| Event | Gold | | Silver | | Bronze | |
|---|---|---|---|---|---|---|
Men's Under-23 Events
| Road race | Sean De Bie; Belgium | 4h 19' 02" | Petr Vakoč; Czech Republic | s.t. | Toms Skujiņš; Latvia | s.t. |
| Time trial | Victor Campenaerts; Belgium | 30' 37.77" | Oleksandr Golovash; Ukraine | + 6.52" | Jasha Sütterlin; Germany | + 24.51" |
Women's Under-23 Events
| Road race | Susanna Zorzi; Italy | 3h 47' 01" | Francesca Cauz; Italy | + 1' 00" | Hanna Solovey; Ukraine | + 1' 05" |
| Time trial | Hanna Solovey; Ukraine | 28' 38.45" | Rossella Ratto; Italy | + 1' 35.45" | Kseniya Dobrynina; Russia | + 1' 50.63" |
Men's Junior Events
| Road race | Frank Bonnamour; France | 3h 18' 28" | Elie Gesbert; France | + 22" | Mathias van Gompel; Belgium | + 46" |
| Time trial | Nikolay Cherkasov; Russia | 27' 45.51" | Igor Decraene; Belgium | + 1.10" | Rémi Cavagna; France | + 42.44" |
Women's Junior Events
| Road race | Greta Richioud; France | 2h 16' 46" | Séverine Eraud; France | + 3" | Kseniya Tuhai; Belarus | + 3" |
| Time trial | Séverine Eraud; France | 20' 48.33" | Floortje Mackaij; Netherlands | + 13.13" | Olena Demidova; Ukraine | + 14.87" |

== Medal table ==
| Rank | Nation | Gold | Silver | Bronze | Total |
|---|---|---|---|---|---|
| 1 | France (FRA) | 3 | 2 | 1 | 6 |
| 2 | Belgium (BEL) | 2 | 1 | 1 | 4 |
| 3 | Italy (ITA) | 1 | 2 | 0 | 3 |
| 4 | Ukraine (UKR) | 1 | 1 | 2 | 4 |
| 5 | Russia (RUS) | 1 | 0 | 1 | 2 |
| 6 | Czech Republic (CZE) | 0 | 1 | 0 | 1 |
| 6 | Netherlands (NED) | 0 | 1 | 0 | 1 |
| 8 | Belarus (BLR) | 0 | 0 | 1 | 1 |
| 8 | Germany (GER) | 0 | 0 | 1 | 1 |
| 8 | Latvia (LAT) | 0 | 0 | 1 | 1 |
| Totals (10 entries) | | 8 | 8 | 8 | 24 |
