= Greta Richioud =

French bicycle racer

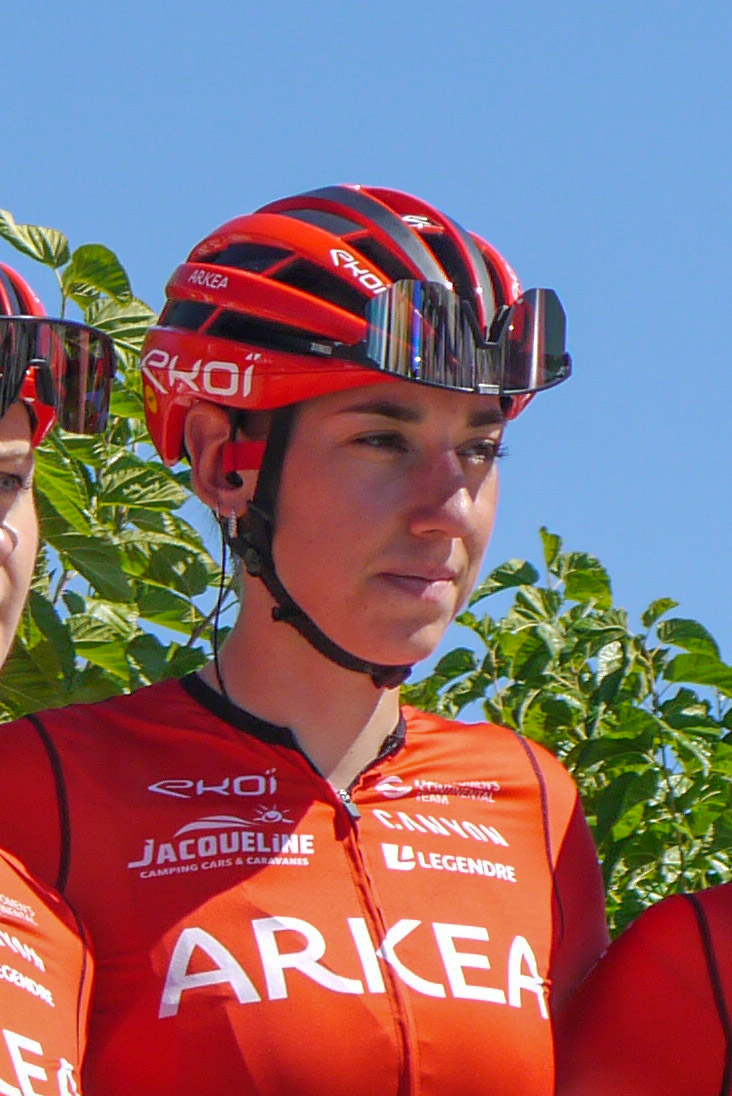
- Richioud in TCFIA 2022.

Personal information
- Full name: Greta Richioud
- Born: 11 October 1996 (age 30) Tournon-sur-Rhône, France

Cycling career
- Sport: Cycling
- Discipline: Road
- Role: Rider

Professional teams
- 2015–2019: Poitou-Charentes.Futuroscope.86
- 2020: Hitec Products–Birk Sport
- 2021–2022: Arkéa Pro Cycling Team
- 2023–2024: Cynisca Cycling

Greta Richioud (born 11 October 1996) is a French professional racing cyclist, who most recently rode for UCI Women's Continental Team Cynisca Cycling.

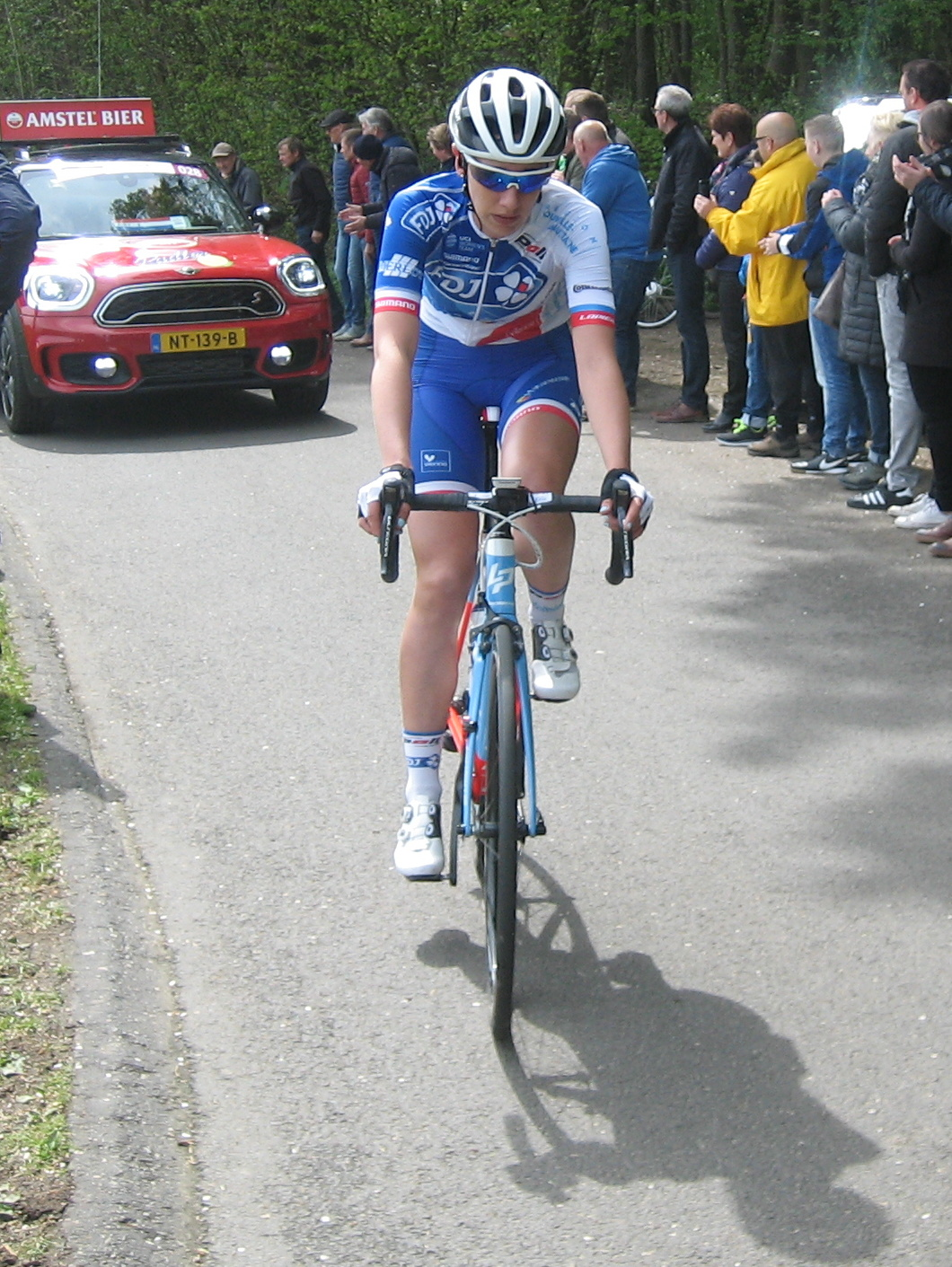
Richioud in the 2017 Amstel Gold Race.

== See also ==
- List of 2015 UCI Women's Teams and riders
