= Netherlands at the European Road Championships =

- IOC code: NED
- Medals: Gold 34 Silver 19 Bronze 25 Total 78

Netherlands at the European Road Championships is an overview of the Dutch results at the European Road Championships. The Netherlands hosted the European Road Championships twice. In 2006 in Valkenburg/Heerlen and in 2012 in Goes.

== List of medalists ==
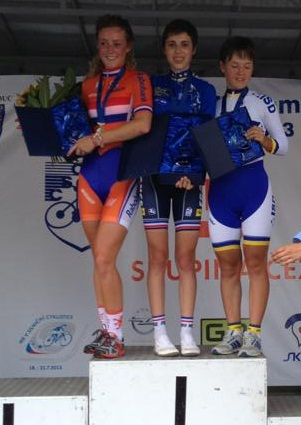
Floortje Mackaij finished second in the women's junior time trial in 2013.

Medal	Championship	Name	Event
Bronze	(Sweden) 1998 Uppsala	Mirella van Melis	Women's under-23 road race
Silver	(Poland) 2000 Kielce	Mirella van Melis	Women's under-23 road race
Gold	(France) 2001 Apremont	Mirella van Melis	Women's under-23 road race
Bronze	(Italy) 2002 Bergamo	Vera Koedooder	Women's under-23 time trial
Bronze	(Greece) 2003 Athens	Vera Koedooder	Women's under-23 road race
Silver	(Estonia) 2004 Otepää	Tom Veelers	Men's under-23 road race
Silver	(Estonia) 2004 Otepää	Bertine Spijkerman	Women's under-23 road race
Gold	(Netherlands) 2006 Valkenburg-Heerlen	Marianne Vos	Women's under-23 road race
Silver	(Netherlands) 2006 Valkenburg-Heerlen	Elise van Hage	Women's junior road race
Bronze	(Netherlands) 2006 Valkenburg-Heerlen	Ronan van Zandbeek	Men's junior road race
Gold	(Bulgaria) 2007 Sofia	Marianne Vos	Women's under-23 road race
Gold	(Italy) 2008 Verbania	Ellen van Dijk	Women's under-23 time trial
Gold	(Belgium) 2009 Hooglede-Gits	Ellen van Dijk	Women's under-23 time trial
Gold	(Belgium) 2009 Hooglede-Gits	Chantal Blaak	Women's under-23 road race
Silver	(Belgium) 2009 Hooglede-Gits	Barry Markus	Men's junior road race
Silver	(Belgium) 2009 Hooglede-Gits	Laura van der Kamp	Women's junior road race
Bronze	(Belgium) 2009 Hooglede-Gits	Marianne Vos	Women's under-23 road race
Bronze	(Belgium) 2009 Hooglede-Gits	Marianne Vos	Women's under-23 time trial
Gold	(Turkey) 2010 Ankara	Noortje Tabak	Women's under-23 road race
Bronze	(Italy) 2011 Offida	Lucinda Brand	Women's under-23 road race
Gold	(Netherlands) 2012 Goes	Anna van der Breggen	Women's under-23 time trial
Gold	(Netherlands) 2012 Goes	Corine van der Zijden	Women's junior time trial
Bronze	(Netherlands) 2012 Goes	Wouter Wippert	Men's under-23 road race
Bronze	(Netherlands) 2012 Goes	Kim de Baat	Women's under-23 road race
Bronze	(Netherlands) 2012 Goes	Kirsten Coppens	Women's junior road race
Silver	(Czech Republic) 2013 Olomouc	Floortje Mackaij	Women's junior time trial
Gold	(Switzerland) 2014 Nyon	Aafke Soet	Women's junior time trial
Gold	(Switzerland) 2014 Nyon	Sabrina Stultiens	Women's under-23 road race
Gold	(Estonia) 2015 Tartu	Steven Lammertink	Men's under-23 road race
Bronze	(Estonia) 2015 Tartu	Thalita de Jong	Women's under-23 road race
Bronze	(Estonia) 2015 Tartu	Dennis van der Horst	Men's junior road race
Bronze	(Estonia) 2015 Tartu	Yara Kastelijn	Women's junior road race
Gold	(France) 2016 Plumelec	Anna van der Breggen	Women's elite road race
Gold	(France) 2016 Plumelec	Ellen van Dijk	Women's elite time trial
Silver	(France) 2016 Plumelec	Anna van der Breggen	Women's elite time trial
Gold	(Denmark) 2017 Herning	Marianne Vos	Women's elite road race
Gold	(Denmark) 2017 Herning	Ellen van Dijk	Women's elite time trial
Gold	(Denmark) 2017 Herning	Lorena Wiebes	Women's junior road race
Bronze	(Denmark) 2017 Herning	Moreno Hofland	Men's elite road race
Bronze	(Denmark) 2017 Herning	Anna van der Breggen	Women's elite time trial
Gold	(Czech Republic) 2018 Brno	Aafke Soet	Women's junior time trial
Silver	(Czech Republic) 2018 Brno	Aafke Soet	Women's junior road race
Gold	(United Kingdom) 2018 Glasgow	Ellen van Dijk	Women's elite time trial
Silver	(United Kingdom) 2018 Glasgow	Mathieu van der Poel	Men's elite road race
Silver	(United Kingdom) 2018 Glasgow	Marianne Vos	Women's elite road race
Silver	(United Kingdom) 2018 Glasgow	Anna van der Breggen	Women's elite time trial
Gold	(Netherlands) 2019 Alkmaar	Amy Pieters	Women's elite road race
Gold	(Netherlands) 2019 Alkmaar	Ellen van Dijk	Women's elite time trial
Gold	(Netherlands) 2019 Alkmaar	Ilse Pluimers	Women's junior road race
Gold	(Netherlands) 2019 Alkmaar	Shirin van Anrooij	Women's junior time trial
Gold	(Netherlands) 2019 Alkmaar	Bauke Mollema; Amy Pieters; Ramon Sinkeldam; Floortje Mackaij; Koen Bouwman; Riejanne Markus	Mixed elite team time trial
Silver	(Netherlands) 2019 Alkmaar	Lars Boven	Men's under-23 time trial
Silver	(Netherlands) 2019 Alkmaar	Sofie van Rooijen	Women's junior time trial
Bronze	(Netherlands) 2019 Alkmaar	Lucinda Brand	Women's elite time trial
Bronze	(Netherlands) 2019 Alkmaar	Lonneke Uneken	Women's under-23 road race
Bronze	(Netherlands) 2019 Alkmaar	Enzo Leijnse	Men's junior time trial
Gold	(France) 2020 Plouay	Annemiek van Vleuten	Women's elite road race
Gold	(France) 2020 Plouay	Anna van der Breggen	Women's elite time trial
Gold	(France) 2020 Plouay	Elise Uijen	Women's junior time trial
Silver	(France) 2020 Plouay	Ellen van Dijk	Women's elite time trial
Silver	(France) 2020 Plouay	Lonneke Uneken	Women's under-23 road race
Gold	(Italy) 2021 Trento	Ellen van Dijk	Women's elite road race
Silver	(Italy) 2021 Trento	Ellen van Dijk	Women's elite time trial
Bronze	(Italy) 2021 Trento	Daan Hoole	Men's under-23 time trial
Bronze	(Italy) 2021 Trento	Elise Uijen	Women's junior time trial
Bronze	(Italy) 2021 Trento	Koen Bouwman; Jos van Emden; Bauke Mollema; Floortje Mackaij; Amy Pieters; Demi Vollering	Mixed elite team time trial
Gold	(Portugal) 2022 Anadia	Shirin van Anrooij	Women's under-23 road race
Gold	(Portugal) 2022 Anadia	Shirin van Anrooij	Women's under-23 time trial
Bronze	(Portugal) 2022 Anadia	Fem van Empel	Women's under-23 time trial
Bronze	(Portugal) 2022 Anadia	Lars Boven; Tim Marsman; Mischa Bredewold; Femke Gerritse	Mixed Under-23 team time trial
Gold	(Germany) 2022 Munich	Fabio Jakobsen	Men's elite road race
Gold	(Germany) 2022 Munich	Lorena Wiebes	Women's elite road race
Silver	(Germany) 2022 Munich	Ellen van Dijk	Women's elite time trial
Bronze	(Germany) 2022 Munich	Riejanne Markus	Women's elite time trial
Gold	(Netherlands) 2023 Drenthe	Mischa Bredewold	Women's elite road race
Gold	(Netherlands) 2023 Drenthe	Ilse Pluijmers	Women's under-23 road race
Silver	(Netherlands) 2023 Drenthe	Lorena Wiebes	Women's elite road race
Bronze	(Netherlands) 2023 Drenthe	Olav Kooij	Men's elite road race

== Most successful Dutch competitors ==
Name	Medals	Championships
Marianne Vos	2 gold, 0 silver, 2 bronze	(gold) 2006 – Women's under-23 road race (gold) 2007 – Women's under-23 road race (bronze) 2009 – Women's under-23 road race (bronze) 2009 – Women's under-23 time trial
Ellen van Dijk	2 gold, 0 silver, 0 bronze	(gold) 2008 – Women's under-23 time trial (gold) 2009 – Women's under-23 time trial
Mirella van Melis	1 gold, 1 silver, 1 bronze	(gold) 2001 – Women's under-23 road race (silver) 2000 – Women's under-23 road race (bronze) 1998 – Women's under-23 road race

== Medal table ==
=== Medals by year ===
Championship	Gold	Silver	Bronze	Total	Rank
(Sweden) 1998 Uppsala	0	0	1	1	7
(Poland) 2000 Kielce	0	1	0	1	4
(France) 2001 Apremont	1	0	0	1	2
(Italy) 2002 Bergamo	0	0	1	1	8
(Greece) 2003 Athens	0	0	1	1	6
(Estonia) 2004 Otepää	0	2	0	2	5
(Netherlands) 2006 Valkenburg-Heerlen	1	1	1	3	3
(Bulgaria) 2007 Sofia	1	0	0	1	5
(Italy) 2008 Verbania	1	0	0	1	5
(Belgium) 2009 Hooglede-Gits	2	2	2	6	1
(Turkey) 2010 Ankara	1	0	0	1	4
(Italy) 2011 Offida	0	0	1	1	8
(Netherlands) 2012 Goes	2	0	3	5	1
(Czech Republic) 2013 Olomouc	0	1	0	1	6
(Switzerland) 2014 Nyon	2	0	0	2	3
(Estonia) 2015 Tartu	1	0	3	4	4
(France) 2016 Plumelec	2	1	0	3	2
(Denmark) 2017 Herning	3	0	2	5	2
(United Kingdom) 2018 Glasgow	2	4	0	6	3
(Netherlands) 2019 Alkmaar	5	2	3	10	1
(France) 2020 Plouay	3	2	0	5	1
(Italy) 2021 Trentino	1	1	3	5	5
(Germany) 2022 Munich	4	1	3	8	1
(Netherlands) 2023 Drenthe	2	1	1	4	5
Total	34	19	25	78	-

=== Medals by discipline ===
updated after the 2023 European Road Championships

Event	Gold	Silver	Bronze	Total	Rank
Men's elite road race	1	1	2	4	2
Men's elite time trial	0	0	0	0	-
Women's elite road race	7	2	0	9	1
Women's elite time trial	5	5	3	13	1
Mixed elite team time trial	1	0	1	2	3
Men's under-23 road race	1	1	1	3	
Men's under-23 time trial	0	1	1	2	
Women's under-23 road race	8	3	7	18	1
Women's under-23 time trial	4	0	3	7	2
Mixed under-23 team time trial	0	0	1	1	
Men's junior road race	0	1	2	3	
Men's junior time trial	0	0	1	1	
Women's junior road race	2	3	2	7	
Women's junior time trial	5	2	1	8	
Total	34	19	25	78	-

== See also ==
Other countries at the European Road Championships

- France at the European Road Championships
- Italy at the European Road Championships
- Sweden at the European Road Championships
- Ukraine at the European Road Championships

Netherlands at other cycling events

- Netherlands at the UCI Road World Championships
- Netherlands at the European Track Championships
- Netherlands at the UCI Track Cycling World Championships
- Netherlands at the UCI Track Cycling World Cup Classics
