= Italy at the European Road Championships =

- IOC code: ITA
- Medals Ranked 1st: Gold 46 Silver 39 Bronze 41 Total 126

Italy at the European Road Championships is an overview of the Italian results at the European Road Championships. Italy hosted the European Road Championships in Bergamo in 2002, in Verbania in 2008, in Offida in 2011, and in Trentino in 2021.

== List of medalists ==
Medal	Championship	Name	Event
Gold	(Czech Republic) 1995 Trutnov	Mirko Celestino	Men's under-23 road race
Bronze	(Czech Republic) 1995 Trutnov	Giuliano Figueras	Men's under-23 road race
Silver	(United Kingdom) 1996 Isle of Man	Daniele Contrini	Men's under-23 road race
Gold	(Austria) 1997 Villach	Salvatore Commesso	Men's under-23 road race
Silver	(Austria) 1997 Villach	Fabio Malberti	Men's under-23 time trial
Bronze	(Austria) 1997 Villach	Maurizio Caravaggio	Men's under-23 time trial
Silver	(Sweden) 1998 Upsala	Marco Pinotti	Men's under-23 time trial
Gold	(Portugal) 1999 Lisbona	Michele Gobbi	Men's under-23 road race
Silver	(Portugal) 1999 Lisbona	Luca Paolini	Men's under-23 road race
Bronze	(Portugal) 1999 Lisbona	Fabio Bulgarelli	Men's under-23 road race
Gold	(Poland) 2000 Kielce	Graziano Gasparri	Men's under-23 road race
Gold	(Poland) 2000 Kielce	Alessandra D'Ettore	Women's under-23 road race
Bronze	(Poland) 2000 Kielce	Lorenzo Bernucci	Men's under-23 road race
Bronze	(Poland) 2000 Kielce	Vera Carrara	Women's under-23 road race
Gold	(France) 2001 Apremont	Giampaolo Caruso	Men's under-23 road race
Gold	(France) 2001 Apremont	Manuel Quinziato	Men's under-23 time trial
Silver	(Italy) 2002 Bergamo	Vera Carrara	Women's under-23 road race
Gold	(Greece) 2003 Athens	Giovanni Visconti	Men's under-23 road race
Gold	(Estonia) 2004 Otepäā	Tatiana Guderzo	Women's under-23 time trial
Bronze	(Estonia) 2004 Otepäā	Anna Zugno	Women's under-23 time trial
Gold	(Russia) 2005 Moscow	Gessica Turato	Women's under-23 road race
Silver	(Russia) 2005 Moscow	Tatiana Guderzo	Women's under-23 time trial
Bronze	(Russia) 2005 Moscow	Anna Zugno	Women's under-23 time trial
Bronze	(Russia) 2005 Moscow	Federico Masiero	Men's junior road race
Bronze	(Russia) 2005 Moscow	Manuele Boaro	Men's junior time trial
Bronze	(Russia) 2005 Moscow	Marta Bastianelli	Women's junior road race
Silver	(Netherlands) 2006 Valkenburg	Tatiana Guderzo	Women's under-23 time trial
Silver	(Netherlands) 2006 Valkenburg	Tatiana Guderzo	Women's under-23 road race
Silver	(Netherlands) 2006 Valkenburg	Thomas Bertolini	Men's junior road race
Bronze	(Netherlands) 2006 Valkenburg	Francesco Gavazzi	Men's under-23 road race
Bronze	(Netherlands) 2006 Valkenburg	Adriano Malori	Men's junior time trial
Gold	(Bulgaria) 2007 Sofia	Valentina Scandolara	Women's junior road race
Silver	(Bulgaria) 2007 Sofia	Marta Bastianelli	Women's under-23 road race
Bronze	(Bulgaria) 2007 Sofia	Gloria Presti	Women's junior road race
Bronze	(Bulgaria) 2007 Sofia	Adriano Malori	Men's under-23 time trial
Gold	(Italy) 2008 Verbania	Adriano Malori	Men's under-23 time trial
Gold	(Italy) 2008 Verbania	Valentina Scandolara	Women's junior road race
Bronze	(Italy) 2008 Verbania	Marta Bastianelli	Women's under-23 road race
Gold	(Belgium) 2009 Hoogled-Gits	Elena Cecchini	Women's junior road race
Gold	(Belgium) 2009 Hoogled-Gits	Luca Walckmann	Men's junior road race
Bronze	(Belgium) 2009 Hoogled-Gits	Sacha Modolo	Men's under-23 road race
Gold	(Turkey) 2010 Ankara	Anna Trevisi	Women's junior road race
Bronze	(Turkey) 2010 Ankara	Rossella Ratto	Women's junior road race
Gold	(Italy) 2011 Offida	Rossella Ratto	Women's junior road race
Gold	(Italy) 2011 Offida	Rossella Ratto	Women's junior time trial
Gold	(Italy) 2011 Offida	Alberto Bettiol	Men's junior road race
Bronze	(Italy) 2011 Offida	Chiara Vanucci	Women's junior road race
Silver	(Netherlands) 2012 Goes	Anna Zita Maria Sticker	Women's junior road race
Silver	(Netherlands) 2012 Goes	Barbara Guarischi	Women's under-23 road race
Bronze	(Netherlands) 2012 Goes	Elisa Longo Borghini	Women's under-23 time trial
Bronze	(Netherlands) 2012 Goes	Davide Ballerini	Men's junior road race
Gold	(Czech Republic) 2013 Olomouc	Susanna Zorzi	Women's under-23 road race
Silver	(Czech Republic) 2013 Olomouc	Francesca Cauz	Women's under-23 road race
Silver	(Czech Republic) 2013 Olomouc	Rossella Ratto	Women's under-23 time trial
Gold	(Switzerland) 2014 Nyon	Silvia Bertizzolo	Women's junior road race
Gold	(Switzerland) 2014 Nyon	Edoardo Affini	Men's junior road race
Silver	(Switzerland) 2014 Nyon	Iuri Filosi	Men's under-23 road race
Silver	(Switzerland) 2014 Nyon	Davide Martinelli	Men's under-23 time trial
Silver	(Switzerland) 2014 Nyon	Elena Cecchini	Women's under-23 road race
Silver	(Switzerland) 2014 Nyon	Alice Gasparini	Men's junior time trial
Gold	(Estonia) 2016 Tartu	Nadia Quagliotto	Women's junior road race
Silver	(Estonia) 2016 Tartu	Rachele Barbieri	Women's junior road race
Silver	(Estonia) 2016 Tartu	Ilaria Sanguineti	Women's under-23 road race
Bronze	(Estonia) 2015 Tartu	Davide Martinelli	Men's under-23 road race
Gold	(France) 2016 Plumelec	Lisa Morzenti	Women's junior time trial
Silver	(France) 2016 Plumelec	Alessia Vigilia	Women's junior time trial
Silver	(France) 2016 Plumelec	Elisa Balsamo	Women's junior road race
Silver	(France) 2016 Plumelec	Filippo Ganna	Men's under-23 time trial
Bronze	(France) 2016 Plumelec	Andrea Vendrame	Men's under-23 road race
Bronze	(France) 2016 Plumelec	Moreno Moser	Men's time trial
Bronze	(France) 2016 Plumelec	Elisa Longo Borghini	Women's road race
Gold	(Denmark) 2017 Herning	Elena Pirrone	Women's junior time trial
Gold	(Denmark) 2017 Herning	Michele Gazzoli	Men's junior road race
Silver	(Denmark) 2017 Herning	Elia Viviani	Men's road race
Silver	(Denmark) 2017 Herning	Letizia Paternoster	Women's road race
Silver	(Denmark) 2017 Herning	Giorgia Bronzini	Women's junior time trial
Gold	(United Kingdom) 2018 Glasgow	Marta Bastianelli	Women's road race
Gold	(United Kingdom) 2018 Glasgow	Matteo Trentin	Men's road race
Gold	(United Kingdom) 2018 Glasgow	Edoardo Affini	Men's U23 time trial
Gold	(United Kingdom) 2018 Glasgow	Vittoria Guazzini	Women's junior time trial
Silver	(United Kingdom) 2018 Glasgow	Vittoria Guazzini	Women's junior road race
Bronze	(United Kingdom) 2018 Glasgow	Antonio Tiberi	Men's junior time trial
Bronze	(United Kingdom) 2018 Glasgow	Letizia Paternoster	Women's U23 road race
Gold	(Netherlands) 2019 Alkmaar	Elia Viviani	Men's road race
Gold	(Netherlands) 2019 Alkmaar	Alberto Dainise	Men's U23 road race
Gold	(Netherlands) 2019 Alkmaar	Letizia Paternoster	Women's U23 road race
Gold	(Netherlands) 2019 Alkmaar	Andrea Piccolo	Men's junior time trial
Silver	(Netherlands) 2019 Alkmaar	Elena Cecchini	Women's road race
Bronze	(Netherlands) 2019 Alkmaar	Edoardo Affini	Men's time trial
Bronze	(Netherlands) 2019 Alkmaar	Elena Pirrone	Women's U23 time trial
Bronze	(Netherlands) 2019 Alkmaar	Andrea Piccolo	Men's junior road race
Bronze	(Netherlands) 2019 Alkmaar	Italy	Mixed Team Relay
Gold	(France) 2020 Plouay	Elisa Balsamo	Women's U23 road races
Gold	(France) 2020 Plouay	Giacomo Nizzolo	Men's road race
Gold	(France) 2020 Plouay	Eleonora Camilla Gasparrini	Women's Junior road race
Silver	(France) 2020 Plouay	Elisa Longo Borghini	Women's road race
Bronze	(France) 2020 Plouay	Lorenzo Milesi	Men's junior time trial
Bronze	(France) 2020 Plouay	Carlotta Cipressi	Women's junior time trial
Bronze	(France) 2020 Plouay	Italy	Mixed team time trial

=== Medals by year ===
Championship	Gold	Silver	Bronze	Total	Rank
(Czech Republic) 1995 Trutnov	1	0	1	2	2
(United Kingdom) 1996 Isle of Men	0	0	1	1	3
(Austria) 1997 Villach	1	1	1	3	2
(Sweden) 1998 Upsala	0	1	0	1	5
(Portugal) 1999 Lisbona	1	1	1	3	2
(Poland) 2000 Kielce	2	0	2	4	1
(France) 2001 Apremont	2	0	0	2	1
(Italy) 2002 Bergamo	0	1	0	1	5
(Greece) 2003 Athens	1	0	0	1	4
(Estonia) 2004 Otepäā	1	0	1	2	2
(Russia) 2005 Moscow	1	1	4	6	2
(Netherlands) 2006 Valkenburg	0	3	2	5	6
(Bulgaria) 2007 Sofia	1	1	2	4	2
(Italy) 2008 Verbania	2	0	1	3	1
(Belgium) 2009 Hooglede-Gits	2	0	1	3	2
(Turkey) 2010 Ankara	1	0	1	2	3
(Italy) 2011 Offida	3	0	1	4	2
(Netherlands) 2012 Goes	0	2	2	4	7
(Czech Republic) 2013 Olomouc	1	2	0	3	3
(Switzerland) 2014 Nyon	2	4	0	6	1
(Estonia) 2015 Tartu	1	2	1	4	2
(France) 2016 Plumec	1	3	3	7	4
(Denmark) 2017 Herning	2	3	1	6	3
(United Kingdom) 2018 Glasgow	1	4	1	2	7
(Netherlands) 2019 Alkmaar	4	1	4	9	2
(France) 2020 Plouay	3	1	3	7	2
Total	37	30	34	101	1

=== Medals by discipline ===
updated after the 2020 European Road Championships

Event	Gold	Silver	Bronze	Total
Women's junior road race	8	4	5	17
Men's under-23 road race	7	3	7	17
Women's under-23 road race	5	7	3	15
Women's junior time trial	5	4	2	10
Men's under-23 time trial	3	4	2	9
Men's junior road race	4	1	3	8
Men's road race	3	1	0	4
Women's under-23 time trial	1	3	4	8
Women's road race	1	3	1	5
Men's junior time trial	1	0	3	4
Men's time trial	0	0	2	2
Mixed Relay	0	0	2	2
Total	37	30	34	101

== See also ==
- France at the European Road Championships
- Netherlands at the European Road Championships
- Sweden at the European Road Championships
- Ukraine at the European Road Championships
