= Latvia at the European Road Championships =

- IOC code: LAT
- Medals: Gold 1 Silver 2 Bronze 3 Total 6

Latvia at the European Road Championships is an overview of the Latvian results at the European Road Championships.

== List of medalists ==
| Medal | Championship | Name | Event |
|---|---|---|---|
| Silver | (Czech Republic) 1995 Turtnov | Romāns Vainšteins | Men's under-23 road race |
| Gold | (Estonia) 2004 Otepää | Kalvis Eisaks | Men's under-23 road race |
| Bronze | (Estonia) 2004 Otepää | Artūrs Ansons | Men's under-23 road race |
| Bronze | (Bulgaria) 2007 Sofia | Normuds Lasis | Men's under-23 road race |
| Silver | (Netherlands) 2012 Goes | Andžs Flaksis | Men's under-23 road race |
| Bronze | (Czech Republic) 2013 Olomouc | Toms Skujiņš | Men's under-23 road race |

== Medal table ==
=== Medals by year ===
| Championship | Gold | Silver | Bronze | Total | Rank |
| (Czech Republic) 1995 Turtnov | 0 | 1 | 0 | 1 | 3 |
| (Estonia) 2004 Otepäā | 1 | 0 | 1 | 2 | 2 |
| (Bulgaria) 2007 Sofia | 0 | 0 | 1 | 1 | 11 |
| (Netherlands) 2012 Goes | 0 | 1 | 0 | 1 | 8 |
| (Czech Republic) 2013 Olomouc | 0 | 0 | 1 | 1 | 8 |
| Total | 1 | 2 | 3 | 5 | |

=== Medals by discipline ===
updated after the 2016 European Road Championships

| Event | Gold | Silver | Bronze | Total |
| Men's under-23 road race | 1 | 3 | 2 | 6 |
| Men's under-23 time trial | 0 | 0 | 0 | 0 |
| Women's under-23 road race | 0 | 0 | 0 | 0 |
| Women's under-23 time trial | 0 | 0 | 0 | 0 |
| Men's junior road race | 0 | 0 | 0 | 0 |
| Men's junior time trial | 0 | 0 | 0 | 0 |
| Women's junior road race | 0 | 0 | 0 | 0 |
| Women's junior time trial | 0 | 0 | 0 | 0 |
| Total | 1 | 3 | 2 | 6 |

== See also ==
- France at the European Road Championships
- Italy at the European Road Championships
- Netherlands at the European Road Championships
- Ukraine at the European Road Championships
