= Victor Campenaerts =

Belgian cyclist (born 1991)

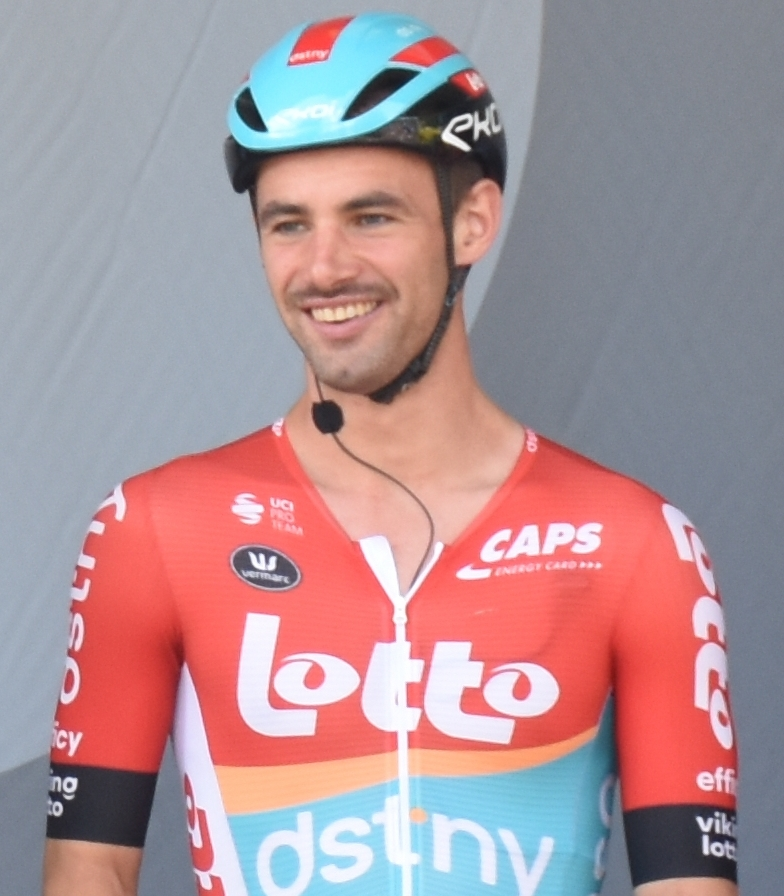
- Campenaerts with Lotto–Dstny in 2023

Personal information
- Born: 28 October 1991 (age 34) Hoboken, Belgium
- Height: 1.73 m (5 ft 8 in)
- Weight: 68 kg (150 lb)

Cycling career
- Sport: Cycling
- Current team: Visma–Lease a Bike
- Discipline: Road
- Role: Rider
- Rider type: Time trialist, Rouleur

Amateur teams
- 2011–2012: Bianchi–Lotto–Nieuwe Hoop Tielen
- 2013: Lotto–Belisol U23

Professional teams
- 2014–2015: Topsport Vlaanderen–Baloise
- 2016–2017: LottoNL–Jumbo
- 2018–2019: Lotto–Soudal
- 2020–2021: NTT Pro Cycling
- 2022–2024: Lotto–Soudal
- 2025–: Visma–Lease a Bike

Major wins
- Grand Tours Tour de France 1 individual stage (2024) 1 TTT stage (2026) Combativity award (2023) Giro d'Italia 1 individual stage (2021) One-day races and Classics European Time Trial Championships (2017, 2018) National Time Trial Championships (2016, 2018) Other Hour record 55.089 km (16 April 2019)
Medal record
Representing Belgium
Men's road bicycle racing
World Championships
Bronze medal – third place	2018 Innsbruck	Time trial
European Championships
Gold medal – first place	2017 Herning	Time trial
Gold medal – first place	2018 Glasgow	Time trial
Gold medal – first place	2013 Olomouc	Under-23 time trial
Silver medal – second place	2016 Plumelec	Time trial
Bronze medal – third place	2020 Plouay	Time trial

Victor Campenaerts (born 28 October 1991) is a Belgian racing cyclist who rides for UCI WorldTeam Visma–Lease a Bike.

== Career ==
He rode in the 2014 UCI Road World Championships.

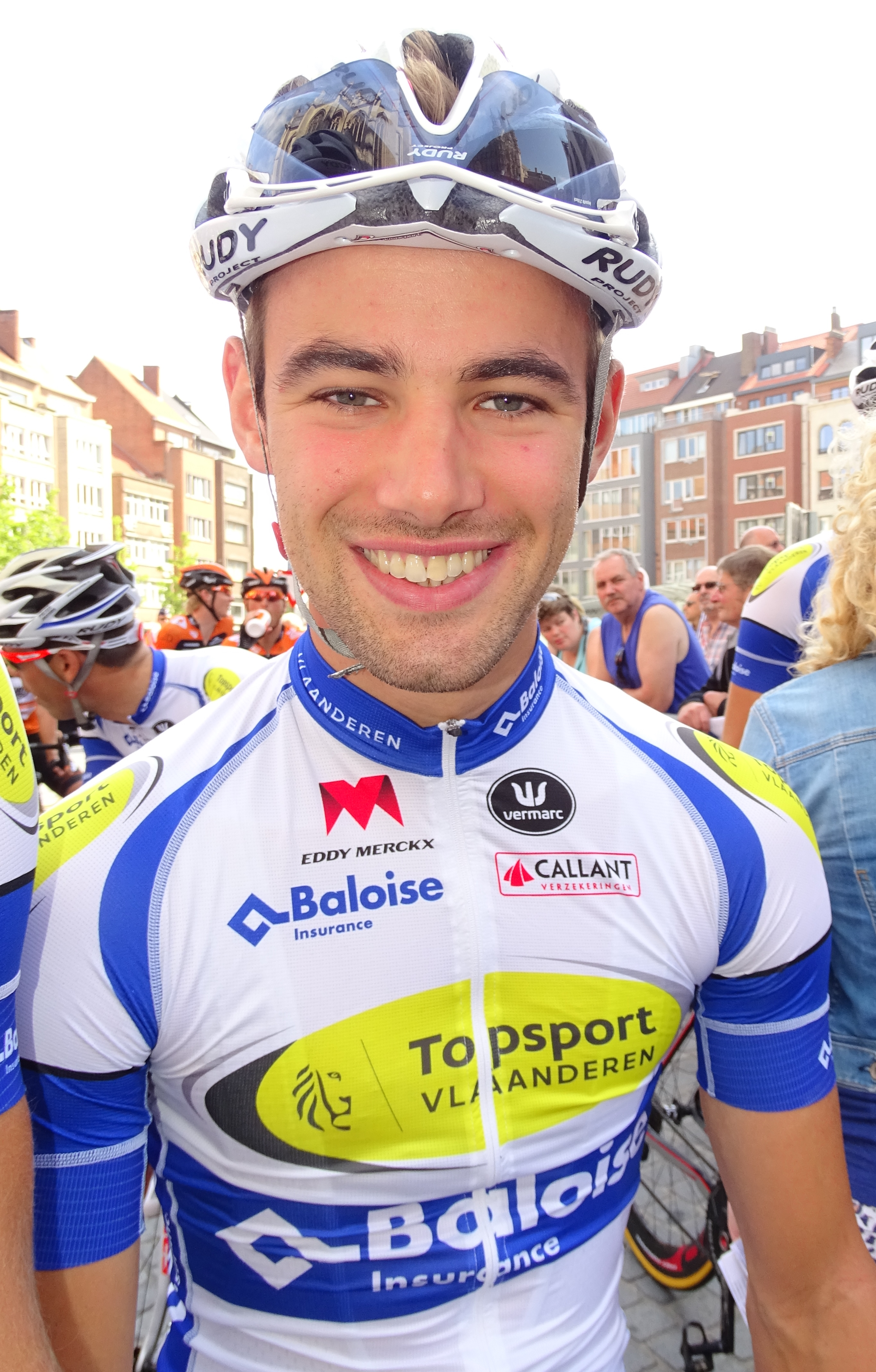
Campenaerts at the 2015 Tour of Leuven

In September 2015 it was announced that he would join the UCI World Tour ranks in 2016 with LottoNL–Jumbo. He was named in the startlist for the 2016 Vuelta a España and the start list for the 2017 Giro d'Italia.

On 16 April 2019, at the Aguascalientes Bicentenary Velodrome in Aguascalientes, Mexico, Campenaerts broke the hour record, riding 55.089 kilometres (34.231 miles), surpassing Bradley Wiggins's previous mark set on 7 June 2015 by 563 metres (1,847 feet). In doing so, he became the fourth Belgian cyclist to hold the hour record, after Oscar Van den Eynde (1897–98), Ferdinand Bracke (1967–68) and Eddy Merckx (1972–2000).

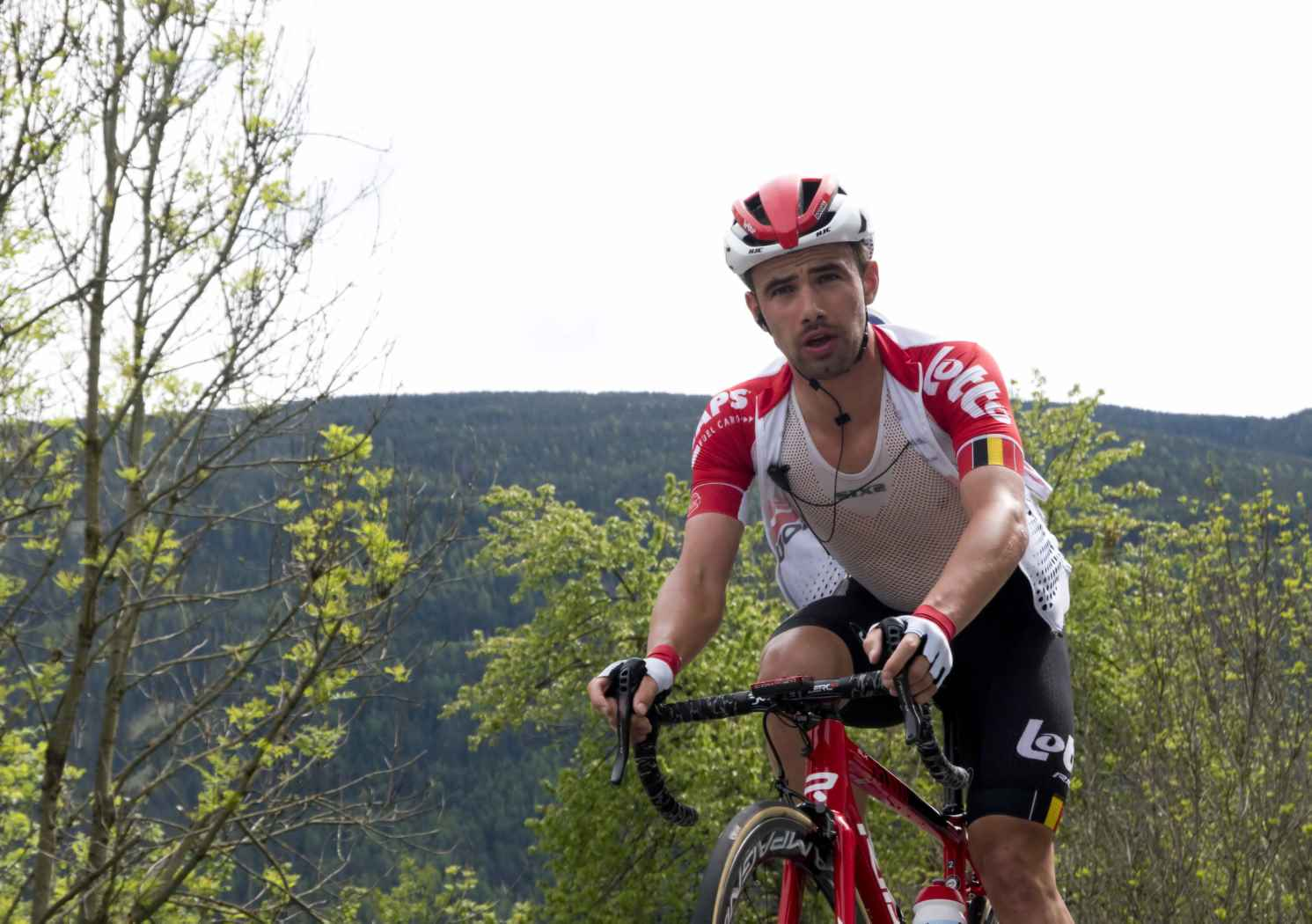
Campenaerts in the 2019 Giro d'Italia

Campenaerts rejoined Lotto–Soudal, on a 3-year contract, in 2022 after 2 years away at Team Qhubeka NextHash.

Riding for the now renamed Lotto–Dstny, Campenaerts rode the 2023 Tour de France. Upon the race's conclusion in Paris, he was selected as the winner of the race's super-combativity award, as the most combative rider overall during the race. Campenaerts made the breakaway 5 times during the race, including on stages 18 and 19, which had both been forecast as sprint finishes. Campenaerts played a big role in each stage's successful breakaway, helping his teammates and holding off the charging peloton.

He continued with Lotto–Dstny into the 2024 Tour de France, at which he won Stage 18.

On 26 August 2024 Visma–Lease a Bike announced that Campenaerts would return to their team for the 2025 season, he signed a contract for three years. He rode for this team previously when it was called LottoNL–Jumbo.

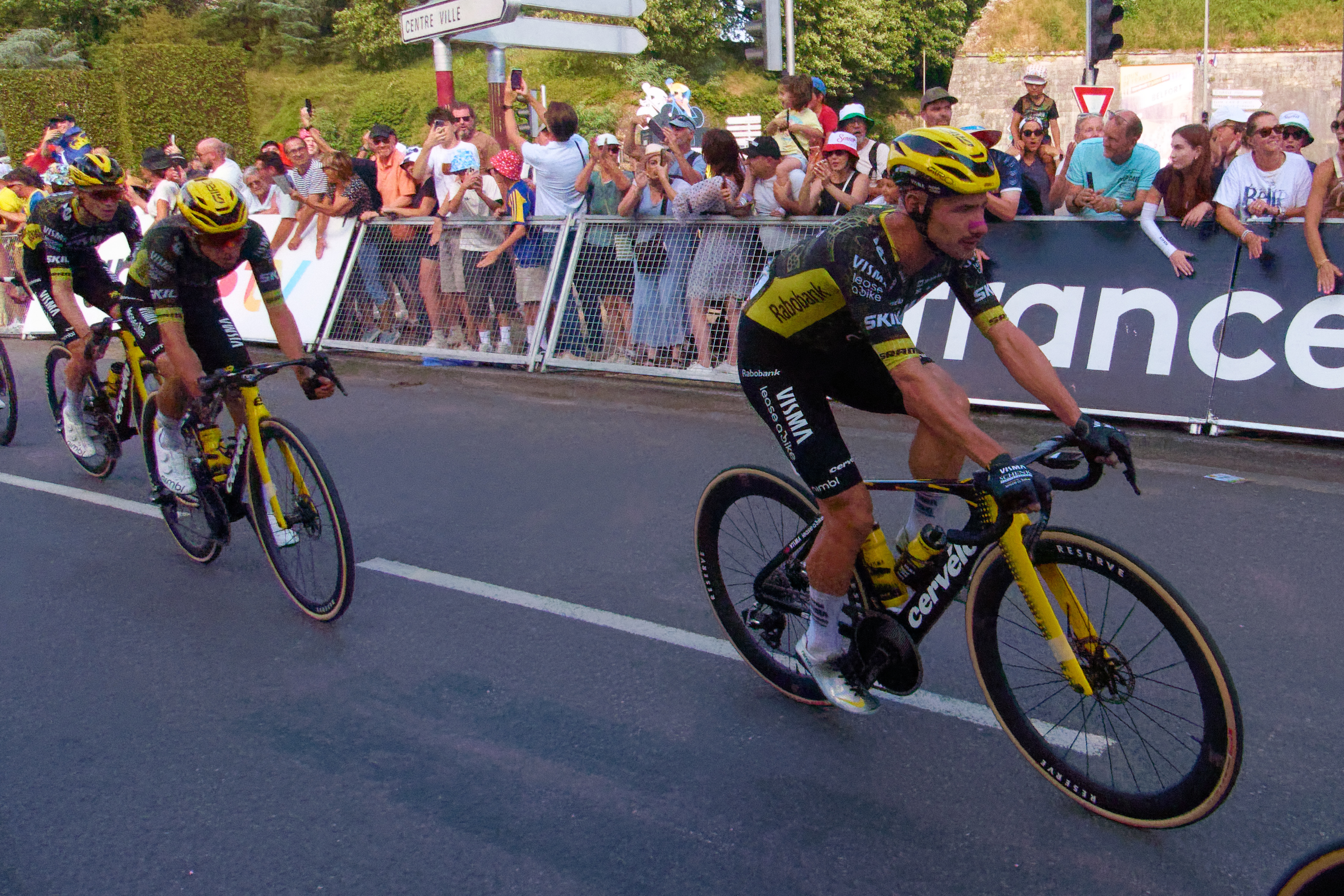
Campenaerts during the 2026 Tour de France

== Major results ==
=== Road ===
2013
1st Time trial, UEC European Under-23 Championships
1st Time trial, National Under-23 Championships
4th Overall Vuelta a la Comunidad de Madrid Under-23
8th Time trial, UCI World Under-23 Championships
8th Antwerpse Havenpijl
2015
1st Duo Normand (with Jelle Wallays)
2nd Overall Tour de Wallonie

1st Young rider classification

4th Overall Ster ZLM Toer
5th Time trial, National Championships
10th Overall Boucles de la Mayenne
2016 (1 pro win)
1st Time trial, National Championships
2nd Time trial, UEC European Championships
2017 (2)
1st Time trial, UEC European Championships
1st Stage 3 (ITT) Vuelta a Andalucía
2nd Time trial, National Championships
4th Overall Tour of Britain
5th Chrono des Nations
9th Brabantse Pijl
10th Rund um Köln
2018 (2)
1st Time trial, UEC European Championships
1st Time trial, National Championships
3rd Time trial, UCI World Championships
2019 (2)
1st Stage 7 (ITT) Tirreno–Adriatico
2nd Overall Tour of Belgium

1st Stage 4

4th Time trial, National Championships
2020
2nd Time trial, National Championships
3rd Time trial, UEC European Championships
8th Time trial, UCI World Championships
2021 (1)
1st Stage 15 Giro d'Italia
3rd Time trial, National Championships
3rd Overall Benelux Tour
10th Road race, UEC European Championships
2022 (1)
1st Tour of Leuven
1st Mountains classification, Tour de Wallonie
3rd Time trial, National Championships
3rd Circuit Franco-Belge
4th Dwars door Vlaanderen
5th Overall Tour of Belgium
5th Omloop Het Nieuwsblad
6th Le Samyn
2023 (2)
1st Druivenkoers Overijse
1st Stage 4 (ITT) Tour de Luxembourg
6th Tour of Leuven
Tour de France

Combativity award Stages 18, 19 & Overall

2024 (1)
1st Stage 18 Tour de France
6th Time trial, UEC European Championships
9th Time trial, UCI World Championships
2025
1st Stage 3 (TTT) Paris–Nice
2026
1st Eneco Tour
1st Stage 1 (TTT) Tour de France

==== Grand Tour general classification results timeline ====
Grand Tour	2016	2017	2018	2019	2020	2021	2022	2023	2024	2025	2026
Giro d'Italia	—	DNF	DNF	111	95	DNF	—	—	—	—	43
Tour de France	—	—	—	—	—	DNF	—	64	81	28	82
Vuelta a España	143	—	102	—	—	—	—	—	111	DNF	—

Legend
—	Did not compete
DNF	Did not finish

=== Track ===
2015
3rd Individual pursuit, National Championships
2016
1st Individual pursuit, National Championships
2019
Hour record: 55.089 km

Preceded by Bradley Wiggins	UCI hour record (55.089 km); 16 April 2019 – 19 August 2022	Succeeded by Daniel Bigham
