= 2026 UCI Track Cycling World Championships – Women's individual pursuit =

Women's individual pursuit at the 2026 UCI Track Cycling World Championships
- Venue: Shanghai Velodrome
- Location: Shanghai, China
- Dates: 17 October
- Competitors: 22 from 14 nations
- Winning time: 4:21.505

Medalists
gold medal	Millie Couzens	Great Britain
silver medal	Josie Knight	Great Britain
bronze medal	Lisa Klein	Germany

The Women's individual pursuit competition at the 2026 UCI Track Cycling World Championships was held on 17 October 2026.

== Results ==
=== Qualifying ===
The qualifying was started at 13:16. The two fastest riders raced for gold, the third and fourth fastest riders raced for bronze.

Rank	Name	Nation	Time	Behind	Notes
1	Millie Couzens	Great Britain	4:21.161		QG
2	Josie Knight	Great Britain	4:22.993	+1.832	QG
3	Martina Alzini	Italy	4:30.619	+9.458	QB
4	Lisa Klein	Germany	4:30.979	+9.818	QB
5	Felicity Wilson-Haffenden	Australia	4:34.108	+12.947	
6	Jasmin Liechti	Switzerland	4:34.684	+13.523	
7	Wei Suwan	China	4:35.115	+13.954	
8	Kristen Faulkner	United States	4:36.121	+14.960	
9	Megan Barker	Great Britain	4:37.862	+16.701	
10	Luca Vierstraete	Belgium	4:39.312	+18.151	
11	Fiona Mangan	Ireland	4:40.059	+18.898	
12	Polina Konrad	Belarus	4:41.358	+20.197	
13	Sophie Edwards	Australia	4:41.543	+20.382	
14	Anna Hicks	United States	4:42.109	+20.948	
15	Song Chao	China	4:43.240	+22.079	
16	Martyna Szczęsna	Poland	4:43.621	+22.460	
17	Zoé Bihan	France	4:43.793	+22.632	
18	Annika Liehner	Switzerland	4:44.354	+23.193	
19	Katrijn De Clercq	Belgium	4:46.098	+24.937	
20	Tamara Szalińska	Poland	4:51.291	+30.130	
21	Maite Ibarra	Chile	4:54.492	+33.331	
22	Ida Ayu Manik Laksmi Dewi	Indonesia	5:12.834	+51.673	

=== Finals ===
The finals were started at 13:16.

Rank	Name	Nation	Time	Behind
Gold medal race
1st place, gold medalist(s)	Millie Couzens	Great Britain	4:21.505	
2nd place, silver medalist(s)	Josie Knight	Great Britain	4:22.002	+0.497
Bronze medal race
3rd place, bronze medalist(s)	Lisa Klein	Germany	4:28.274	
4	Martina Alzini	Italy	4:32.749	+4.475
