= Alexander Wachter =

Austrian cyclist

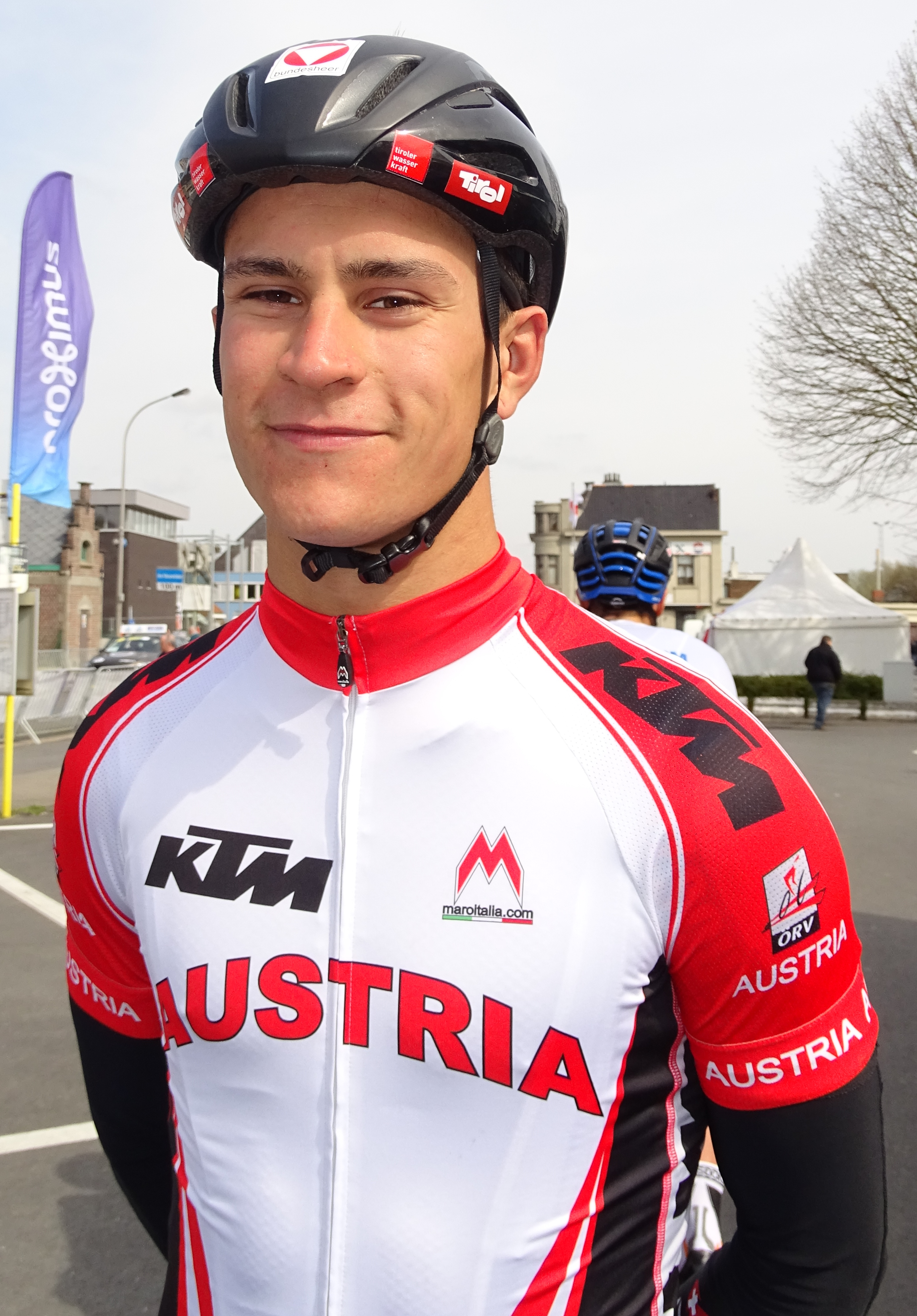
- Wachter in 2016

Personal information
- Full name: Alexander Wachter
- Born: 21 January 1995 (age 31) Austria
- Height: 1.83 m (6 ft 0 in)
- Weight: 72 kg (159 lb)

Cycling career
- Sport: Cycling
- Current team: Retired
- Discipline: Road
- Role: Rider

Professional team
- 2014–2017: Tirol Cycling Team
Medal record
Representing Austria
Men's road bicycle racing
European Championships
Gold medal – first place	2012 Goes	Junior road race

Alexander Wachter (born 21 January 1995) is an Austrian former professional cyclist.

== Major results ==
2011
2nd Criterium, European Youth Summer Olympic Festival
2012
1st Road race, UEC European Junior Road Championships
1st Road race, National Junior Road Championships
1st Stage 4 Trofeo Karlsberg
2013
National Junior Road Championships

1st Road race
2nd Time trial

3rd Overall Grand Prix Général Patton
5th Overall Trofeo Karlsberg
7th Overall Oberösterreich Juniorenrundfahrt

1st Points classification
1st Stage 1

2015
4th Poreč Trophy
6th Overall Carpathian Couriers Race

1st Stage 1
