= Millie Couzens =

British cyclist (born 2003)

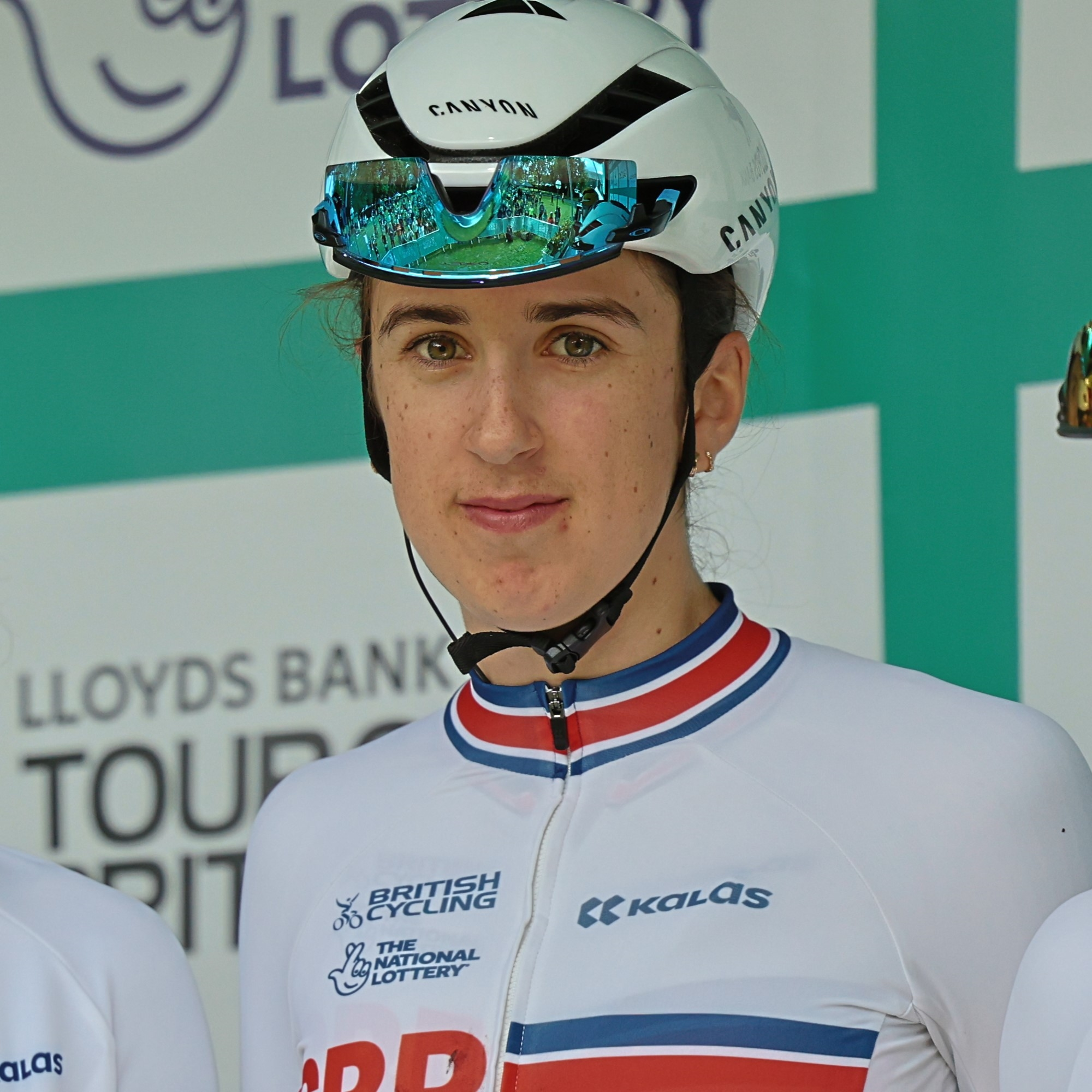
- Couzens at the 2024 Tour of Britain Women

Personal information
- Born: 29 October 2003 (age 22) Banbury, England
- Height: 1.72 m (5 ft 8 in)

Cycling career
- Sport: Cycling
- Current team: Fenix–Premier Tech
- Disciplines: Road, track, cyclocross
- Role: Rider

Professional team
- 2022–: Fenix–Premier Tech

Major wins
- Road One-day races and Classics National Road Race Championships (2025) Track World Championships Individual pursuit (2026) Team pursuit (2026)
Medal record
Women's track cycling
Representing Great Britain
World Championships
Gold medal – first place	2026 Shanghai	Individual pursuit
Gold medal – first place	2026 Shanghai	Team pursuit
European Championships
Gold medal – first place	2026 Konya	Team pursuit
Bronze medal – third place	2026 Konya	Individual pursuit

Millie Couzens (born 29 October 2003) is a British professional cyclist who currently rides for UCI Women's WorldTeam Fenix–Premier Tech at road and cyclo-cross races, and for Great Britain on the track.. In the latter discipline, she is the 2026 UCI Track World champion in both the individual and team pursuit.

== Early life ==
Couzens was born in Banbury in Oxfordshire. She began cycle racing with Bicester Millennium Cycling Club, and won the U11 individual title at the British Schools National Cycle Championships in 2015 while a pupil at Bure Park Primary School in Bicester. She moved on to The Bicester School for her secondary education.

== Cycling career ==
=== Under-16 and Junior ===
Couzens first found success in cyclo-cross, winning the under-16 race at the British National Cyclo-cross Championships in 2018 at the age of 14 and the junior (under-19) race in 2020, when she also took fourth place in the junior race at the World Championships.

She joined the British Cycling track team as a junior, taking three gold medals at the 2021 European Track Championships, in the omnium, the Madison (with Zoe Bäckstedt) and the team pursuit (with Bäckstedt, Grace Lister and Madelaine Leech).

Couzens also found success on the road as a junior, winning the British National Road Race Championships in 2021.

=== Elite ===
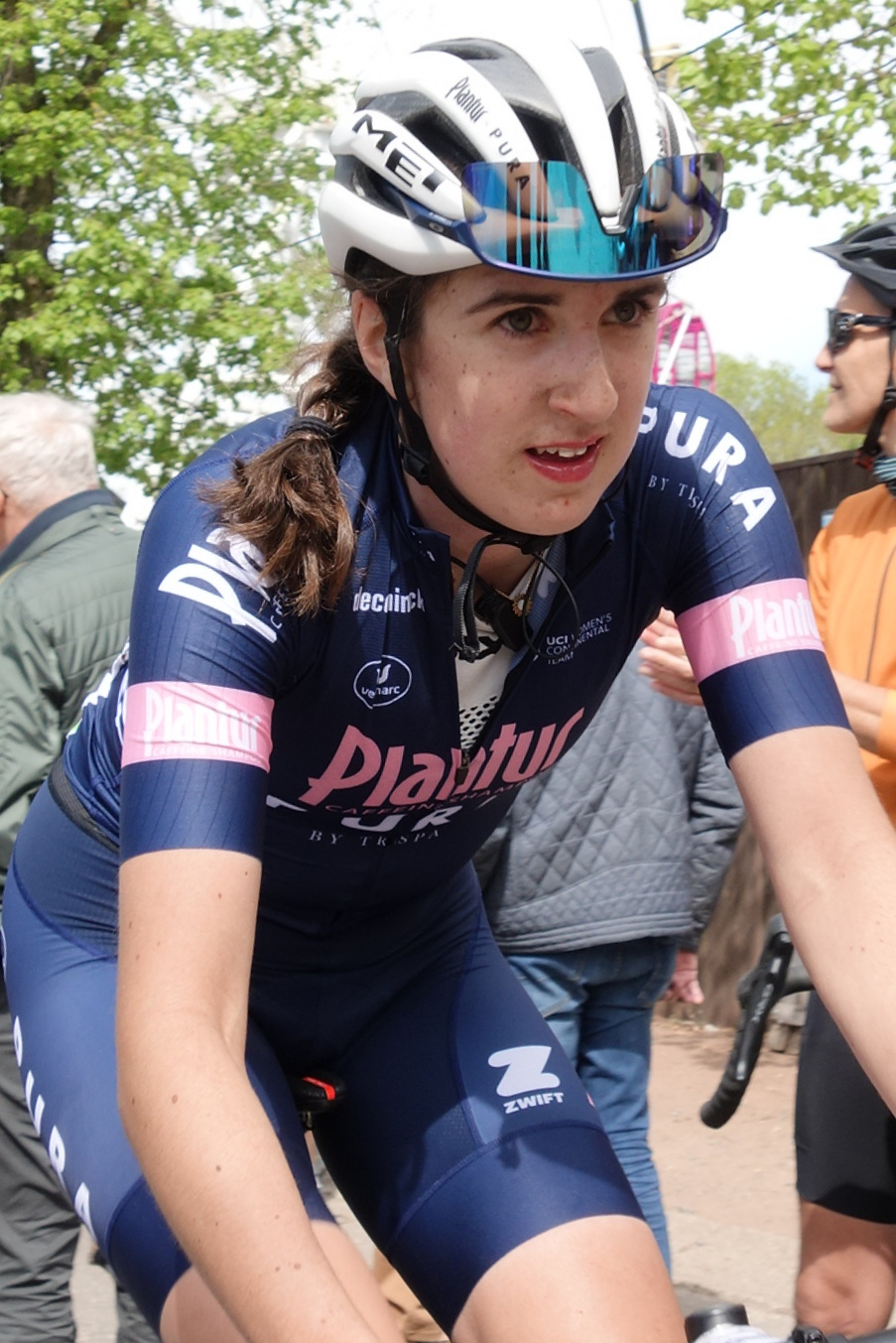
Couzens at La Flèche Wallonne Femmes in 2022

In 2021, she was recruited by Belgian cycling team owners Christoph and Philip Roodhooft to ride professionally with their IKO–Crelan cyclo-cross team and Plantur–Pura road team (now named Fenix–Premier Tech). She won her first elite UCI cyclocross race at Cyclopark in Gravesend, Kent in December.

In May 2025, she took second place behind Mischa Bredewold in a bunch sprint on Stage 1 of the 2025 Itzulia Women. A few weeks later at the Tour of Britain Women, she finished tenth in the general classification and second in the young rider classification, riding for the Great Britain national team. In June 2025, she won the under-23 category at the British National Time Trial Championships by 50 seconds.

At the 2026 European Championships in Konya, Couzens was part of the British team pursuit line-up who set a new world record en route to the gold medal. The team consisting of Couzens, Katie Archibald, Anna Morris and Josie Knight also set a new world record of 4:02.808 in the final against Germany. She also won a bronze medal in the individual pursuit. In June 2026, she finished third at the British National Road Race Championships.

At the 2026 UCI Track Cycling World Championships in Shanghai, Couzens, Knight, Morris and Erin Boothman became world champions in the team pursuit after overcoming Italy in the final. She then became world champion in the individual pursuit by defeating her compatriot Knight in the gold medal race.

== Major results ==
=== Cyclo-cross ===
2019–2020
1st National Junior Championships
4th UCI World Junior Championships
5th UEC European Junior Championships
2021–2022
National Trophy Series

1st Gravesend

2022–2023
National Trophy Series

1st Falkirk
1st Gravesend

=== Road ===
2021
4th Overall Watersley Ladies Challenge
6th Road race, UCI World Junior Championships
2023
3rd Argenta Classic-2 Districtenpijl
7th Overall Baloise Ladies Tour
2024
5th Road race, National Championships
2025 (1 pro win)
1st Road race, National Championships
1st Time trial, National Under-23 Championships
2nd Argenta Classic
3rd Dwars door het Hageland
6th Time trial, UCI World Under-23 Championships
10th Overall Tour of Britain
2026
3rd Road race, National Championships
5th Overall Baloise Ladies Tour
6th Trofeo Oro in Euro
8th Omloop Het Nieuwsblad

=== Track ===
2020
3rd Team pursuit, National Championships
2021
UEC European Junior Championships

1st Madison (with Zoe Bäckstedt)
1st Omnium
1st Team pursuit

1st Madison, National Junior Championships (with Zoe Bäckstedt)
2026
UCI World Championships

1st Individual pursuit
1st Team pursuit

UEC European Championships

1st Team pursuit
3rd Individual pursuit
