= Cycling at the 2011 European Youth Summer Olympic Festival =

Cycling at the 2011 European Youth Summer Olympic Festival was held from 26 to 28 July 2011. The competitions took place at the Trabzon-Rize Highway, Turkey.

== Medal summary ==
=== Medal table ===
Rank	Nation	Gold	Silver	Bronze	Total
1	Poland	1	1	0	2
2	Denmark	1	0	0	1
2	Slovenia	1	0	0	1
4	Austria	0	1	0	1
4	Belgium	0	1	0	1
6	Germany	0	0	1	1
6	Italy	0	0	1	1
6	Slovakia	0	0	1	1
Totals (8 entries)		3	3	3	9

=== Medal events ===
Event	Gold	Silver	Bronze
Road Race	Ziga Rucigaj (SLO)	Adam Trudzinski (POL)	Niccolo Pacinotti (ITA)
Time Trial	Mathias Krigbaum (DEN)	Dries Verstrepen (BEL)	David Zverko (SVK)
Criterium	Tobiasz Jan Lis (POL)	Alexander Wachter (AUT)	Leon R. Rohde (GER)

== See also ==
- European Youth Olympic Festival
