= 2007 European Road Championships – Women's under-23 road race =

Women's Road Race
2007 European Road Championships
- UEC European Champion jersey

Race details
- Dates: 21 July
- Stages: 1
- Distance: 112 km (69.59 mi)
- Winning time: 03h 02' 54"

Medalists
	Gold	Marianne Vos (Netherlands)
	Silver	Marta Bastianelli (Italy)
	Bronze	Rasa Leleivytė (Lithuania)

The Women's U23 road race at the 2007 European Road Championships took place on July 21. The Championships were hosted in Sofia, Bulgaria. The course was 112 km long and started in the morning.

== Final classification ==
Rank	Rider	Time
1st place, gold medalist(s)	Marianne Vos (NED)	3h 02m 54s
2nd place, silver medalist(s)	Marta Bastianelli (ITA)	"
3rd place, bronze medalist(s)	Rasa Leleivytė (LTU)	"
4	Claudia Häusler (GER)	"
5	Pascale Jeuland (FRA)	"
6	Elizabeth Armitstead (GBR)	"
7	Loes Markerink (NED)	"
8	Jennifer Hohl (SUI)	"
9	Ine Beyen (BEL)	"
10	Venera Absalyamova (RUS)	"
11	Ellen van Dijk (NED)	+ ?
11	(40 more riders)*	"

- 41 riders were classified ex-aequo at the 11th position, because the video camera didn't work correctly.
