= Mathias Krigbaum =

Danish cyclist (born 1995)

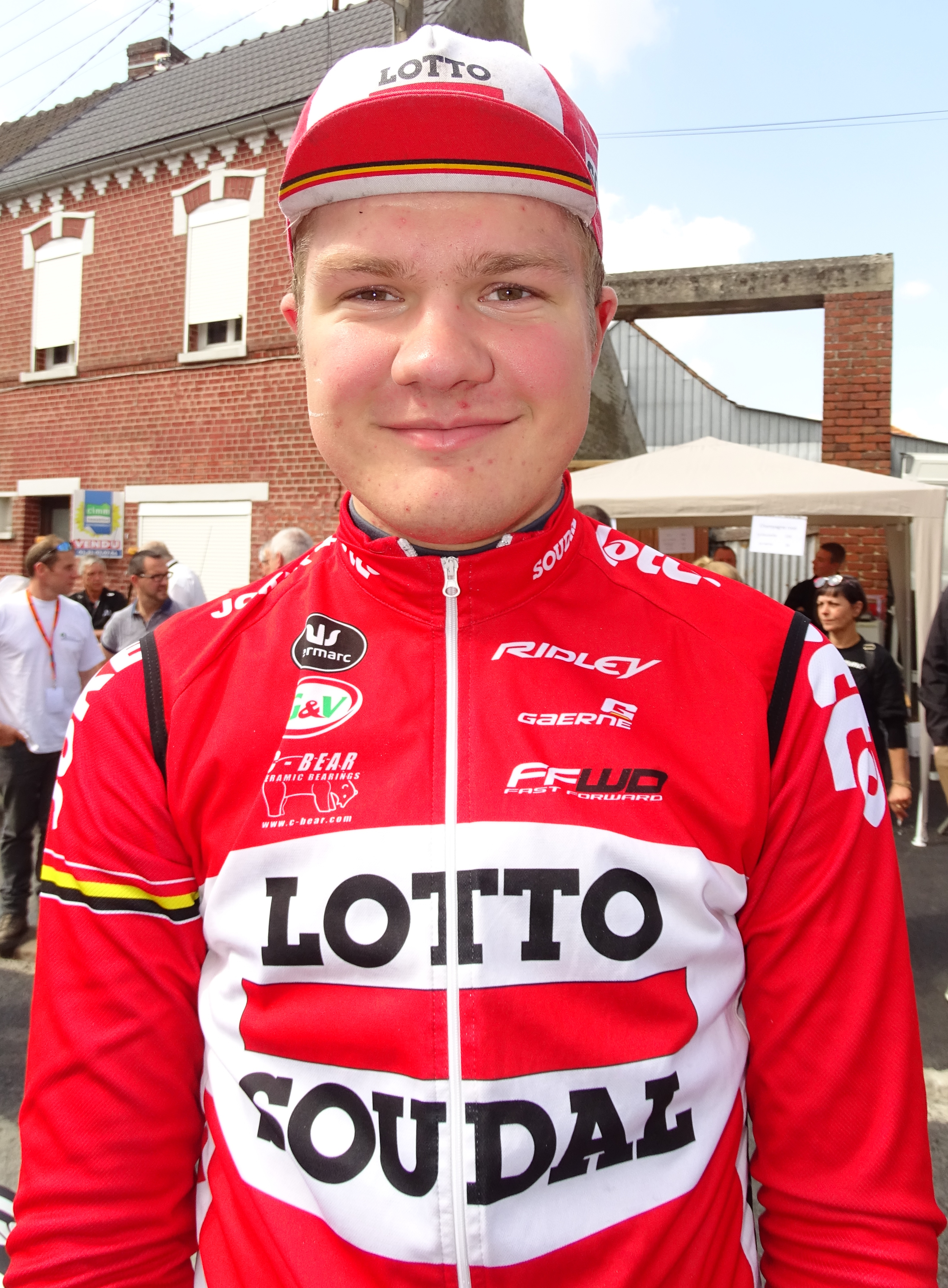
- Krigbaum in 2015.

Personal information
- Full name: Mathias W. Krigbaum
- Born: 3 February 1995 (age 31) Copenhagen, Denmark
- Height: 1.86 m (6 ft 1 in)
- Weight: 79 kg (174 lb)

Cycling career
- Sport: Cycling
- Current team: Team ColoQuick
- Disciplines: Road; Track
- Role: Rider (retired); Directeur sportif
- Rider type: Time Trialist

Amateur team
- 2015: Lotto–Soudal U23

Professional teams
- 2014: Riwal Cycling Team
- 2015–2016: Veranclassic–Ekoi
- 2016: Christina Jewelry Pro Cycling
- 2017: Team ColoQuick–Cult
- 2018: Team Virtu Cycling
- 2019: Team ColoQuick

Managerial team
- 2020–: Team ColoQuick

Mathias W. Krigbaum (born 3 February 1995) is a Danish entrepreneur and former professional cyclist, who rode professionally between 2014 and 2019. He is the owner of Danish clothing brand L'evasion, and also works as a directeur sportif for UCI Continental team Team ColoQuick.

== Major results ==
2011
1st Time trial, European Youth Summer Olympic Festival
2012
1st Time trial, UEC European Junior Road Championships
UEC European Junior Track Championships

1st Team pursuit (with Mathias Møller Nielsen, Elias Busk and Jonas Poulsen)
2nd Madison (with Jonas Poulsen)

National Track Championships

1st Omnium
1st Junior omnium
1st Junior points race
1st Junior team pursuit (with Jonas Poulsen, Patrick Olesen and Nicklas Pedersen Bøje)

1st Stage 2b Tour du Pays de Vaud
2nd Overall Niedersachsen-Rundfahrt

1st Stage 2

5th Time trial, UCI Junior World Road Championships
2013
1st Madison, UCI Juniors Track World Championships (with Jonas Poulsen)
1st Overall Sint-Martinusprijs Kontich

1st Prologue & Stage 2

2nd Time trial, UCI Junior World Road Championships
3rd Time trial, National Junior Road Championships
9th Time trial, UEC European Junior Road Championships
2017
National Road Championships

4th Road race
5th Time trial

7th Overall Ronde van Midden Nederland
