= Lisa Klein (cyclist) =

German cyclist (born 1996)

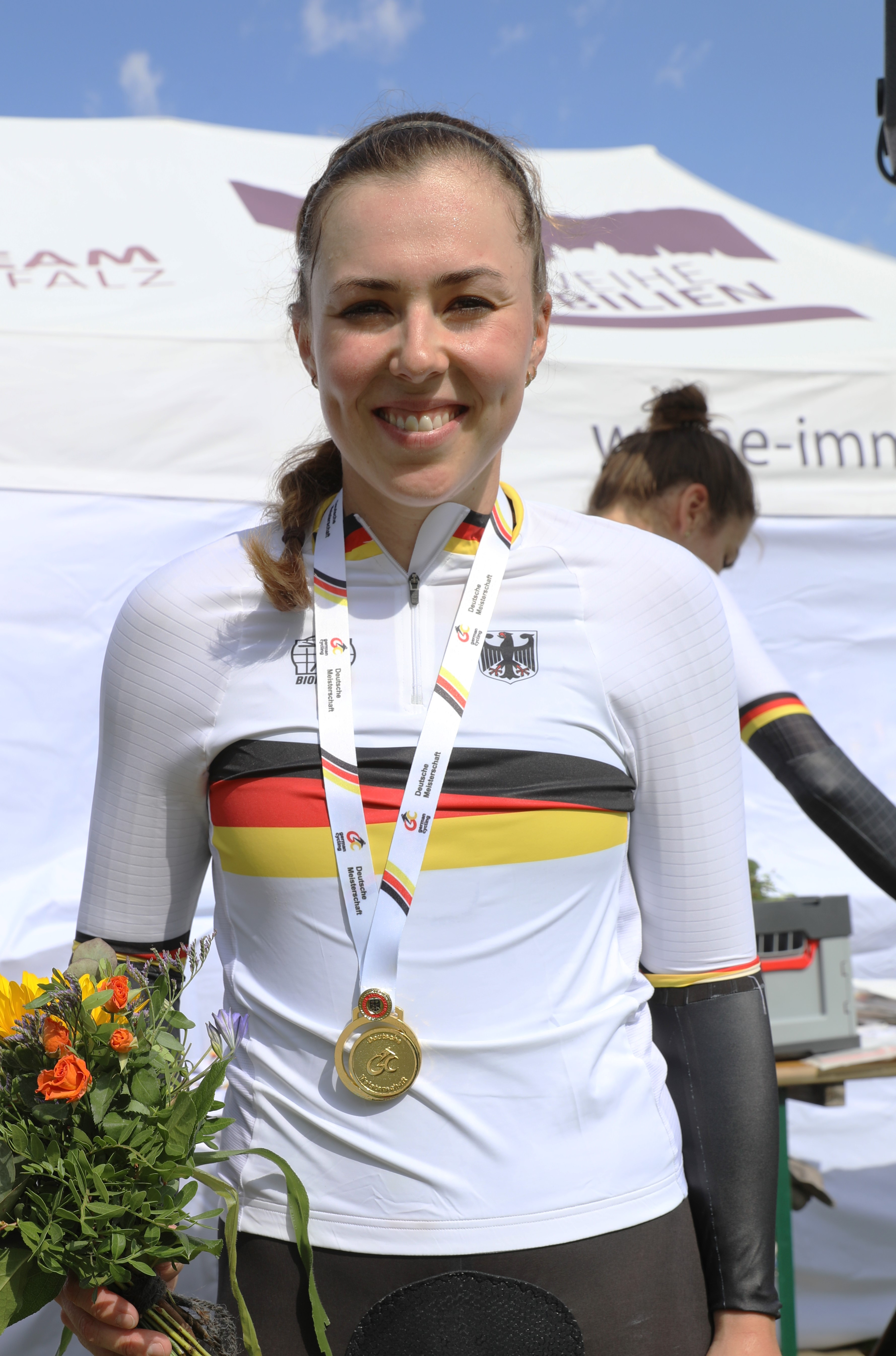
- Klein in 2025

Personal information
- Full name: Lisa Klein
- Born: 15 July 1996 (age 30) Saarbrücken, Germany
- Height: 1.69 m (5 ft 7 in)
- Weight: 61 kg (134 lb)

Cycling career
- Sport: Cycling
- Current team: Lidl–Trek
- Disciplines: Road; Track
- Role: Rider
- Rider type: Time trialist

Professional teams
- 2015–2017: Bigla Pro Cycling Team
- 2018–2022: Canyon//SRAM
- 2023–: Trek–Segafredo

Major wins
- Track Olympic Games Team pursuit (2020)
Medal record
Representing Germany
Women's road bicycle racing
World Championships
Gold medal – first place	2021 Flanders	Mixed team relay
Silver medal – second place	2019 Yorkshire	Mixed team relay
Bronze medal – third place	2023 Glasgow	Mixed team relay
European Championships
Silver medal – second place	2019 Alkmaar	Time trial
Silver medal – second place	2019 Alkmaar	Mixed team relay
Silver medal – second place	2024 Limburg	Mixed team relay
Bronze medal – third place	2019 Alkmaar	Road race
Bronze medal – third place	2023 Drenthe	Mixed team relay
Women's track cycling
Olympic Games
Gold medal – first place	2020 Tokyo	Team pursuit
World Championships
Silver medal – second place	2024 Ballerup	Team pursuit
Silver medal – second place	2025 Santiago	Team pursuit
Bronze medal – third place	2019 Pruszków	Individual pursuit
Bronze medal – third place	2020 Berlin	Team pursuit
Bronze medal – third place	2026 Shanghai	Individual pursuit
Bronze medal – third place	2026 Shanghai	Team pursuit
European Championships
Gold medal – first place	2022 Munich	Team pursuit
Silver medal – second place	2019 Apeldoorn	Team pursuit
Silver medal – second place	2025 Heusden-Zolder	Team pursuit
Silver medal – second place	2026 Konya	Team pursuit
Bronze medal – third place	2023 Grenchen	Team pursuit
Bronze medal – third place	2024 Apeldoorn	Team pursuit

Lisa Klein (born 15 July 1996) is a German professional racing cyclist, who currently rides for UCI Women's WorldTeam Lidl–Trek.

== Major results ==
=== Road ===
2013
National Junior Championships

2nd Road race
3rd Time trial

2014
National Junior Championships

1st Road race
1st Time trial

5th Road race, UCI World Junior Championships
2015
4th Crescent Vargarda TTT
2016
2nd Crescent Vargarda TTT
3rd Team time trial, UCI World Championships
UEC European Under-23 Championships

3rd Time trial
10th Road race

8th Overall Tour de Feminin-O cenu Českého Švýcarska
2017
National Championships

1st Road race
4th Time trial

1st Prologue Giro della Toscana
2nd Crescent Vargarda TTT
UEC European Under-23 Championships

3rd Time trial
5th Road race

4th Overall Healthy Ageing Tour

1st Young rider classification

4th Overall Festival Elsy Jacobs

1st Young rider classification

5th Overall Ladies Tour of Norway

1st Young rider classification

2018
1st Team time trial, UCI World Championships
2nd Overall BeNe Ladies Tour

1st Young rider classification

UEC European Under–23 Championships

2nd Time trial
9th Road race

3rd Time trial, National Championships
3rd Gent–Wevelgem
4th Ladies Tour of Norway TTT
4th Crescent Vårgårda UCI Women's WorldTour TTT
5th Overall Festival Elsy Jacobs

1st Prologue

6th Overall Healthy Ageing Tour

1st Young rider classification

2019
1st Time trial, National Championships
1st Overall BeNe Ladies Tour

1st Prologue & Stage 2b

UEC European Championships

2nd Team relay
2nd Time trial

2nd Team relay, UCI World Championships
2nd Nokere Koerse
5th UCI Road World Championships – Women's time trial
2020
1st Team relay, UEC European Championships
2021
1st Team relay, UCI World Championships
1st Overall BeNe Ladies Tour

1st Stage 2b (ITT)

3rd Nokere Koerse
6th Scheldeprijs
6th Overall Healthy Ageing Tour
7th UCI Road World Championships – Women's time trial
2022
6th Overall Bloeizone Fryslân Tour

=== Track ===
2015
2nd Team pursuit, UEC European Under-23 Championships
2017
2nd Scratch, Six Days of Bremen
2018
1st Omnium, National Championships
2021
1st Team pursuit, Olympic Games
2025
2nd Team pursuit, UCI World Championships
