= Ilse Pluimers =

Dutch cyclist (born 2002)

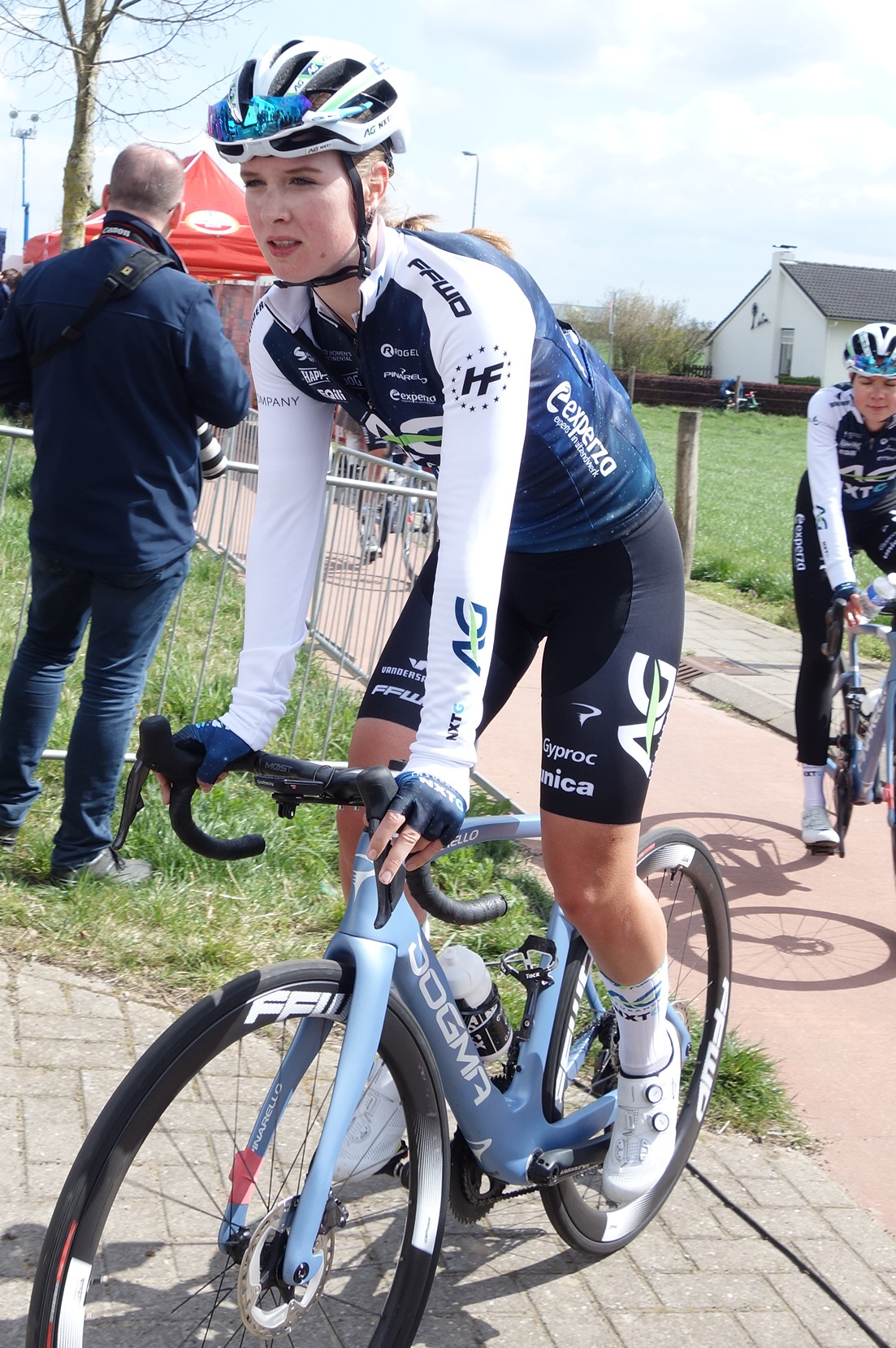
- Pluimers in 2022

Personal information
- Born: 29 April 2002 (age 24) Wierden, Netherlands

Cycling career
- Sport: Cycling
- Current team: AG Insurance–Soudal
- Discipline: Road
- Role: Rider

Professional team
- 2021–: NXTG Racing
Medal record
Women's road bicycle racing
Representing Netherlands
European Championships
Gold medal – first place	2023 Drenthe	Under-23 road race
Gold medal – first place	2019 Alkmaar	Junior road race

Ilse Pluimers (born 29 April 2002) is a Dutch professional racing cyclist, who currently rides for UCI Women's WorldTeam AG Insurance–Soudal. She competed at the 2022 Tour de France Femmes and won the under-23 road race at the 2023 European Road Championships.

Her brother Rick also competes as a professional cyclist and her grandfather Johan was also a cyclist.

== Major results ==
2019
1st Road race, European Junior Road Championships
2nd Road race, National Junior Road Championships
2020
2nd Time trial, National Junior Road Championships
2023
1st Road race, European Under-23 Road Championships
1st Omloop van Borsele Time trial
8th GP Oetingen
2024
6th Antwerp Port Epic
2025
9th Omloop Het Nieuwsblad
