= 2019 European Road Championships =

25th European Road Cycling Championships

- Location within Netherlands
- Venue: Alkmaar, The Netherlands
- Date: 7–11 August 2019
- Coordinates: 52°38′N 4°45′E
- Events: 13

The 2019 European Road Cycling Championships was the 25th running of the European Road Cycling Championships, that took place from 7 to 11 August 2019 in Alkmaar, the Netherlands. The event consisted of a total of 6 road races and 7 time trials, including the introduction of the new mixed team relay, regulated by the Union Européenne de Cyclisme (UEC).

== Location ==
The organization was initially awarded to Annecy, France, but the organisers there wanted different dates due to the busy tourism season in August and eventually returned the assignment. The UEC then asked the Dutch province of Drenthe to organise the European Championships, after their bid to organize the World Championships was rejected. In January there were several Dutch cities in the running, of which one fell after the other. There was not enough support in Emmen, the national championships are being held in Ede this year and Den Bosch said it had never been an official candidate. In February Alkmaar was the only one left, after which the organization was definitively awarded on 25 March.

== Race Schedule ==
All times are in CEST (UTC+2).

Date	Timings		Event	Distance
Mixed Team Relay
7 August	14:30	16:30	Mixed Team Relay	44.8 km (27.8 mi)
Individual time trial events
7 August	9:00	10:30	Junior women	22.4 km (13.9 mi)
7 August	11:15	12:45	Junior men	22.4 km (13.9 mi)
8 August	9:00	10:15	Under-23 women	22.4 km (13.9 mi)
8 August	10:45	12:00	Elite women	22.4 km (13.9 mi)
8 August	12:45	14:15	Under-23 men	22.4 km (13.9 mi)
8 August	15:00	16:30	Elite men	22.4 km (13.9 mi)
Road race events
9 August	9:00	11:00	Junior women	69 km (43 mi)
9 August	12:00	15:00	Under-23 women	92 km (57 mi)
9 August	16:00	19:00	Junior men	115 km (71 mi)
10 August	9:00	13:00	Under-23 men	138 km (86 mi)
10 August	13:30	17:30	Elite women	115 km (71 mi)
11 August	11:30	16:00	Elite men	172.5 km (107.2 mi)

== Elite ==
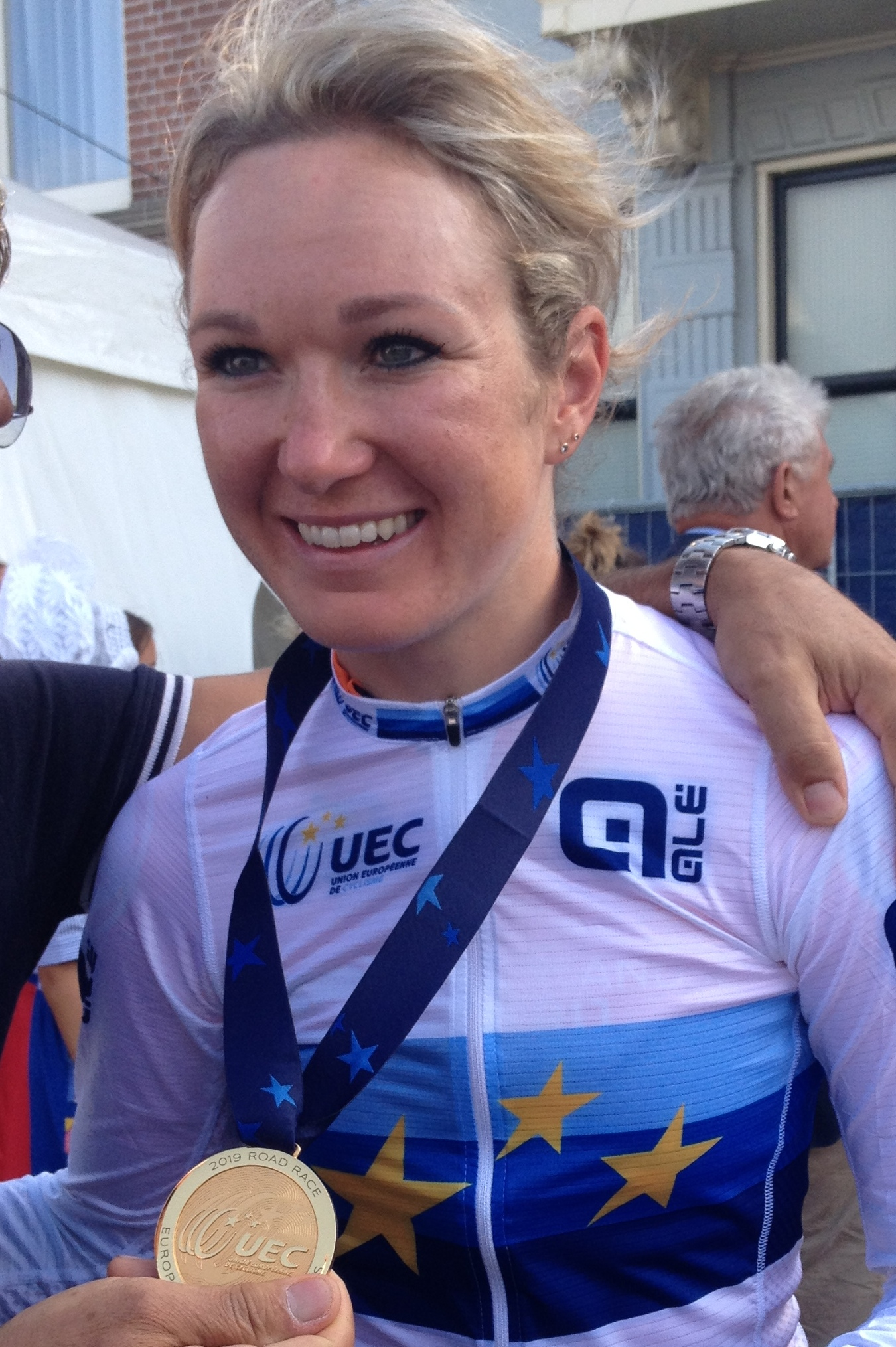
Amy Pieters (women's road race)

Event	Gold		Silver		Bronze	
Men's Elite Events
Road race	Elia Viviani (ITA)	3h 30' 52"	Yves Lampaert (BEL)	+ 1"	Pascal Ackermann (GER)	+ 8"
Time trial	Remco Evenepoel (BEL)	24' 55"	Kasper Asgreen (DEN)	+ 18"	Edoardo Affini (ITA)	+ 20"
Women's Elite Events
Road race	Amy Pieters (NED)	2h 56' 02"	Elena Cecchini (ITA)	+ 0"	Lisa Klein (GER)	+ 0"
Time trial	Ellen van Dijk (NED)	28' 07"	Lisa Klein (GER)	+ 30"	Lucinda Brand (NED)	+ 52"

== Under 23 ==
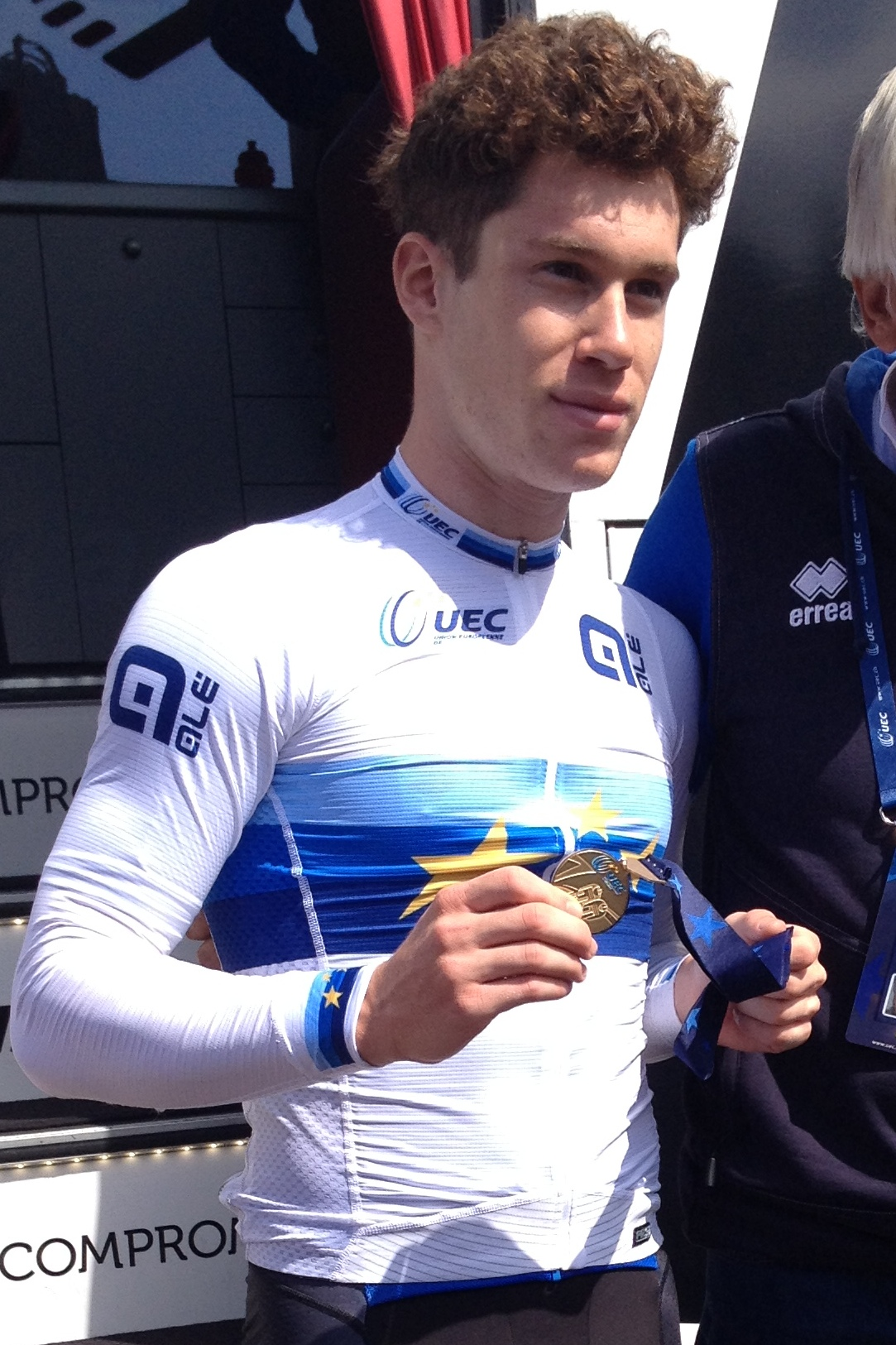
Alberto Dainese (men's U-23 road race)

Event	Gold		Silver		Bronze	
Men's Under-23 Events
Road race	Alberto Dainese (ITA)	3h 08' 53"	Niklas Larsen (DEN)	+ 0"	Rait Ärm (EST)	+ 0"
Time trial	Johan Price-Pejtersen (DEN)	25' 53"	Mikkel Bjerg (DEN)	+ 11"	Stefan Bissegger (SUI)	+ 12"
Women's Under-23 Events
Road race	Letizia Paternoster (ITA)	2h 15' 00"	Marta Lach (POL)	+ 0"	Lonneke Uneken (NED)	+ 0"
Time trial	Hannah Ludwig (GER)	29' 20"	Maria Novolodskaya (RUS)	+ 38"	Elena Pirrone (ITA)	+ 39"

== Junior ==
Event	Gold		Silver		Bronze	
Road race	Andrii Ponomar (UKR)	2h 32' 27"	Maurice Ballerstedt (GER)	+ 21"	Andrea Piccolo (ITA)	+ 21"
Time trial	Andrea Piccolo (ITA)	26' 52"	Lars Boven (NED)	+ 12"	Enzo Leijnse (NED)	+ 14"
Women's Junior Events
Road race	Ilse Pluimers (NED)	1h 44' 14"	Sofie van Rooijen (NED)	+ 5"	Kristina Nenadovic (FRA)	+ 5"
Time trial	Shirin van Anrooij (NED)	30' 18"	Aigul Gareeva (RUS)	+ 2"	Wilma Olausson (SWE)	+ 42"

== Mixed Team Relay ==
Event	Gold		Silver		Bronze	
Time Trial	Netherlands	52' 49"	Germany	+ 14"	Italy	+ 1'25"
Time Trial	Bauke Mollema; Amy Pieters; Ramon Sinkeldam; Floortje Mackaij; Koen Bouwman; Riejanne Markus		Lisa Klein; Jasha Sütterlin; Mieke Kröger; Justin Wolf; Lisa Brennauer; Marco Mathis		Vittoria Guazzini; Edoardo Affini; Elisa Longo Borghini; Manuele Boaro; Silvia Valsecchi; Davide Martinelli	

== Overall medal table ==
Rank	Nation	Gold	Silver	Bronze	Total
1	Netherlands (NED)	5	2	3	10
2	Italy (ITA)	4	1	4	9
3	Germany (GER)	1	3	2	6
4	Denmark (DEN)	1	3	0	4
5	Belgium (BEL)	1	1	0	2
6	Ukraine (UKR)	1	0	0	1
7	Russia (RUS)	0	2	0	2
8	Poland (POL)	0	1	0	1
9	Estonia (EST)	0	0	1	1
9	France (FRA)	0	0	1	1
9	Sweden (SWE)	0	0	1	1
9	Switzerland (SUI)	0	0	1	1
Totals (12 entries)		13	13	13	39
