= Corine van der Zijden =

Dutch cyclist (born 1995)

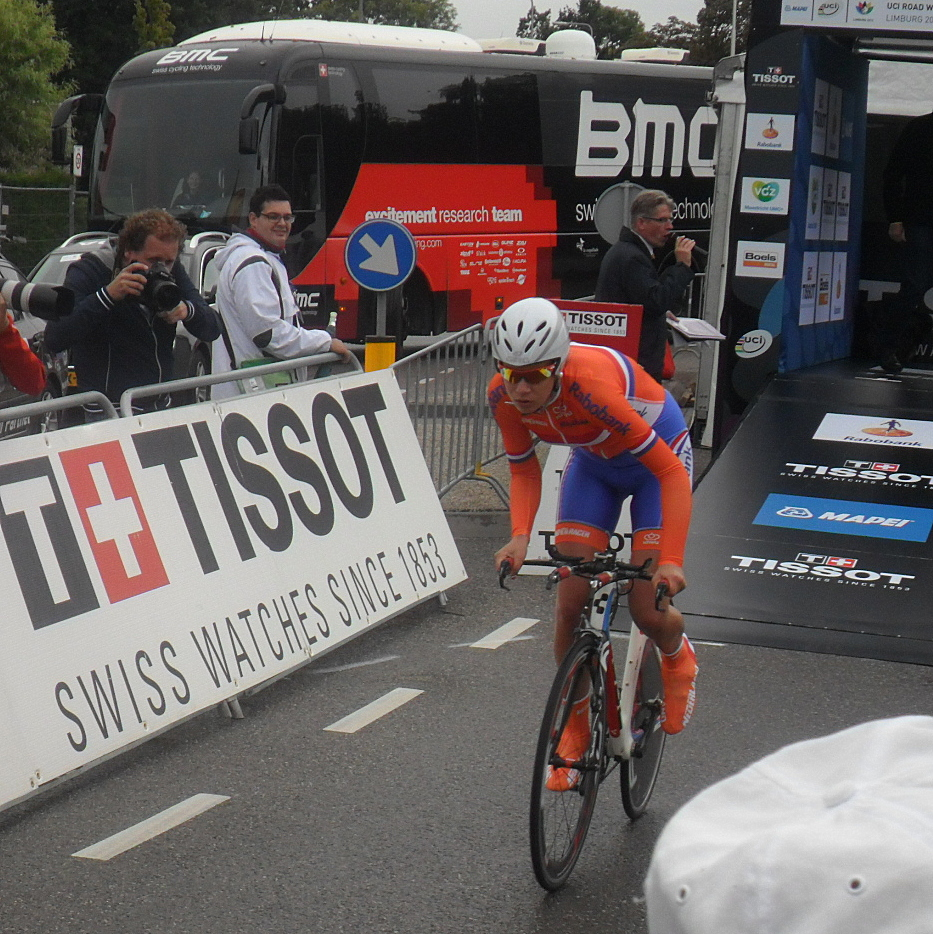
- Van der Zijden in 2012

Personal information
- Born: 16 November 1995 (age 30) Tienhoven, Netherlands

Cycling career
- Sport: Cycling
- Current team: Retired
- Discipline: Road
- Role: Rider

Amateur teams
- 2013–2014: RC Jan van Arckel
- 2016–2017: RC Jan van Arckel

Professional team
- 2015: Feminine Cycling Team

Corine van der Zijden (born 16 November 1995) is a Dutch former professional racing cyclist, who rode for UCI Women's Team Feminine Cycling Team in 2015. In 2012, she won the junior women's time trial at the UEC European Road Championships.

== See also ==
- List of 2015 UCI Women's Teams and riders
