= 2016 European Road Championships =

22nd running of the European Road Cycling Championships

- Location within France
- Venue: Plumelec, France
- Date: 14–18 September 2016
- Coordinates: 47°50′N 2°38′W
- Events: 12

The 2016 European Road Cycling Championships was the 22nd running of the European Road Cycling Championships, that took place over 14–18 September 2016 in Plumelec, France. The event consisted of a total of 5 road races and 5 time trials, regulated by the Union Européenne de Cyclisme (UEC). The 2016 championships were the first to be run with elite events for riders over 23 years of age, although the women's under-23 events were combined with the women's elite events.

== Relocation of the championships ==
Initially the championships were planned to be held in Nice, France. However, on 5 August, three weeks after the Bastille Day terrorist attack there, mayor Philippe Pradal cancelled their hosting of the event, stating that the championships would require a large police presence which had not yet been guaranteed to him. The Union Européenne de Cyclisme (UEC) further explained that the "huge security presence" could not be guaranteed in Nice due to "the significant constraints".

The European Cycling Union received several new applications: from Yorkshire in the United Kingdom, Trentino and the Marche region in Italy and the French application of the Plumelec-Morbihan department within the French Brittany region. On 13 August, it was announced that the championships would be held in Plumelec-Morbihan.

== Schedule ==
=== Individual time trial ===
Date	Time	Event	Distance	Route	Profile
Wednesday 14 September	09:30	Women's junior	12.7 km (7.9 mi)		
Wednesday 14 September	12:00	Men's under-23	24.5 km (15.2 mi)		
Wednesday 14 September	14:00	Men's juniors	25.5 km (15.8 mi)		
Thursday 15 September	10:30	Women's elite & under-23	25.4 km (15.8 mi)		
Thursday 15 September	14:00	Men's elite	45.5 km (28.3 mi)		

=== Road race ===
Date	Time	Event	Distance	Laps	Route	Profile
Friday 16 September	10:00	Women's junior	68.5 km (42.6 mi)	5		
Friday 16 September	13:30	Men's juniors	123.3 km (76.6 mi)	9		
Saturday 17 September	09:00	Men's under-23	150.7 km (93.6 mi)	11		
Saturday 17 September	14:00	Women's elite & under-23	109.6 km (68.1 mi)	8		
Sunday 18 September	10:30	Men's elite	232.9 km (144.7 mi)	17		

== Courses ==
=== Time trial ===
All the starts were held on the Rue du Canal in Josselin apart from the junior women, who started on the Place de l'église in Plumelec. All event finishes were at the top of the Côte de Cadoudal, a 1.8 km (1.1 mi), 7.8% average gradient hill in Plumelec. The elite women, men's under-23 and men's junior races were held over the same course.

=== Road race ===
All road races took place on a 13.7 km (8.5 mi) circuit, that were completed a varying number of times. All events started and finished at the top of the Côte de Cadoudal, a 1.8 km (1.1 mi), 7.8% average gradient hill in Plumelec. The circuit was the same as the one held for the Grand Prix de Plumelec.

== Events summary ==
Event	Gold		Silver		Bronze	
Men's Elite Events
Road race	Peter Sagan (SVK)	5h 34' 23"	Julian Alaphilippe (FRA)	s.t.	Daniel Moreno (ESP)	s.t.
Time trial	Jonathan Castroviejo (ESP)	58' 13.99"	Victor Campenaerts (BEL)	+ 29.44"	Moreno Moser (ITA)	+ 34.31"
Women's Elite Events
Road race	Anna van der Breggen (NED)	2h 55' 55"	Katarzyna Niewiadoma (POL)	s.t.	Elisa Longo Borghini (ITA)	s.t.
Time trial	Ellen van Dijk (NED)	36' 41.07"	Anna van der Breggen (NED)	+ 18.40"	Olga Zabelinskaya (RUS)	+ 23.39"
Men's Under-23 Events
Road race	Alexandr Riabushenko (BLR)	3h 32' 43"	Bjorg Lambrecht (BEL)	s.t.	Andrea Vendrame (ITA)	s.t.
Time trial	Lennard Kämna (DEU)	33' 59.87"	Filippo Ganna (ITA)	+ 29.71"	Rémi Cavagna (FRA)	+ 34.31"
Women's Under-23 Events
Road race	Katarzyna Niewiadoma (POL)	2h 55' 55"	Cecilie Uttrup Ludwig (DNK)	+ 12"	Séverine Eraud (FRA)	+ 12"
Time trial	Anastasiia Iakovenko (RUS)	39' 35.87"	Ksenyia Tuhai (BLR)	+ 9.62"	Lisa Klein (DEU)	+ 11.61"
Men's Junior Events
Road race	Nicolas Malle (FRA)	3h 03' 49"	Emilien Jeannière (FRA)	s.t.	Tadej Pogačar (SLO)	s.t.
Time trial	Alexys Brunel (FRA)	35' 58.76"	Marc Hirschi (SUI)	+ 10.78"	Iver Knotten (NOR)	+ 11.02"
Women's Junior Events
Road race	Liane Lippert (DEU)	1h 54' 14"	Elisa Balsamo (ITA)	+ 4"	Sophie Wright (GBR)	+ 4"
Time trial	Lisa Morzenti (ITA)	19' 02.04"	Alessia Vigilia (ITA)	+ 14.62"	Juliette Labous (FRA)	+ 22.54"

== Medal table ==
Rank	Nation	Gold	Silver	Bronze	Total
1	France (FRA)	2	2	3	7
2	Netherlands (NED)	2	1	0	3
3	Germany (DEU)	2	0	1	3
4	Italy (ITA)	1	3	3	7
5	Belarus (BLR)	1	1	0	2
5	Poland (POL)	1	1	0	2
7	Russia (RUS)	1	0	1	2
7	Spain (ESP)	1	0	1	2
9	Slovakia (SVK)	1	0	0	1
10	Belgium (BEL)	0	2	0	2
11	Denmark (DNK)	0	1	0	1
11	Switzerland (SUI)	0	1	0	1
13	Great Britain (GBR)	0	0	1	1
13	Norway (NOR)	0	0	1	1
13	Slovenia (SLO)	0	0	1	1
Totals (15 entries)		12	12	12	36

== Broadcasting ==
- Belgium: Eén
- Denmark: TV2 Sport
- France: France 3, Eurosport France
- Norway: NRK2, NRK2, NRK1
- Europe (54 countries): Eurosport International, Eurosport Player
- United Kingdom: Eurosport UK
- Asia (17 countries): Eurosport Asia
- Netherlands: NPO 1
