= 1995 European Road Championships =

- Venue: Trutnov, Czech Republic
- Date: August 1995
- Events: 2

The 1995 European Road Championships were held in Trutnov, the Czech Republic, in the last weekend of August 1995. These European Road Championships were the first regulated by the European Cycling Union. The event consisted of a road race for men and women under 23.

== Schedule ==
=== Road race ===
Saturday 26 August 1995

- Women U23

- Men U23

== Events summary ==
Event	Gold	Silver	Bronze
Men's Under-23 Events
Road race	Mirko Celestino; Italy	Romāns Vainšteins; Latvia	Giuliano Figueras; Italy
Women's Under-23 Events
Road race	Regina Schleicher; Germany	Evi Gensheimer; Germany	Elena Unruh; Germany

== Medal table ==
Rank	Nation	Gold	Silver	Bronze	Total
1	Germany (GER)	1	1	1	3
2	Italy (ITA)	1	0	1	2
3	Latvia (LAT)	0	1	0	1
Totals (3 entries)		2	2	2	6
