= 2001 European Road Championships =

- Venue: Apremont, France
- Date: 24–26 August 2001
- Events: 4

The 2001 European Road Championships were held in Apremont, France, between 24 August and 26 August 2001, regulated by the European Cycling Union. The event consisted of a road race and a time trial for men and women under-23.

== Schedule ==
=== Individual time trial ===
Friday 24 August 2001

- Women under-23
- Men under-23

=== Road race ===
Sunday 26 August 2001

- Women under-23
- Men under-23

== Events summary ==
Event	Gold		Silver		Bronze	
Men's Under-23 Events
Road race	Giampaolo Caruso; Italy	3 h 50 min 53s	Eric Baumann; Germany	+ 9s	Roman Lougovyi; Ukraine	s.t.
Time trial	Manuel Quinziato; Italy	39 min 03s	Alexander Bespalov; Russia	+ 20s	Sebastian Lang; Germany	+ 30s
Women's Under-23 Events
Road race	Mirella van Melis; Netherlands	2 h 49 min 56s	Angela Hennig-Brodtka; Germany	s.t.	Sophie Creux; France	s.t.
Time trial	Nicole Brändli; Switzerland	27 min 28s	Lada Kozlíková; Czech Republic	+ 3s	Olga Zabelinskaïa; Russia	+ 13s

== Medal table ==
Rank	Nation	Gold	Silver	Bronze	Total
1	Italy (ITA)	2	0	0	2
2	Netherlands (NLD)	1	0	0	1
2	Switzerland (SUI)	1	0	0	1
4	Germany (GER)	0	2	1	3
5	Russia (RUS)	0	1	1	2
6	Czech Republic (CZE)	0	1	0	1
7	France (FRA)	0	0	1	1
7	Ukraine (UKR)	0	0	1	1
Totals (8 entries)		4	4	4	12
