= 2020 European Road Championships =

26th European Road Cycling Championships

- Location within Brittany Location within France
- Venue: Plouay, France
- Date: 24–28 August 2020
- Coordinates: 47°54′56″N 3°20′2″W
- Events: 13

The 2020 European Road Cycling Championships was the 26th running of the European Road Cycling Championships that took place from 24 to 28 August 2020 in Plouay, France. The event consisted of a total of 6 road races and 7 time trials.

== Location ==
On 10 June 2019, it was announced that Trentino, Italy would host this event from 9 to 13 September 2020. However, due to the COVID-19 pandemic in Italy, the UEC and Trentino officials decided to postpone the city's hosting of the event to 2021. It was later announced in July that Plouay, France would step up to host the event from 24 to 28 August 2020, with the city also hosting the French National Road Race and Time Trial Championships the week prior, as well as the Bretagne Classic and GP de Plouay – Bretagne on 25 and 26 August, respectively.

== Race Schedule ==
All times are in CEST (UTC+2).

Date	Timings		Event	Distance
Individual time trial events
24 August	9:00	10:20	Junior women	25.6 km (15.9 mi)
24 August	10:25	11:55	Junior men	25.6 km (15.9 mi)
24 August	12:00	13:05	Under-23 women	25.6 km (15.9 mi)
24 August	13:10	14:25	Under-23 men	25.6 km (15.9 mi)
24 August	14:30	15:35	Elite women	25.6 km (15.9 mi)
24 August	16:10	17:15	Elite men	25.6 km (15.9 mi)
Road race events
26 August	9:00	12:00	Under-23 women	81.9 km (50.9 mi)
26 August	13:40	16:00	Elite men	177.45 km (110.26 mi)
27 August	9:00	12:00	Under-23 men	136 km (85 mi)
27 August	13:40	15:55	Elite women	109.2 km (67.9 mi)
28 August	11:20	14:00	Junior men	109.25 km (67.88 mi)
28 August	9:00	11:00	Junior women	68.25 km (42.41 mi)
Mixed Team Relay
28 August	14:30	17:15	Mixed Team Relay	54.6 km (33.9 mi)

== Elite ==
Event	Gold		Silver		Bronze	
Men's Elite Events
Road race	Giacomo Nizzolo (ITA)	4h 12' 23"	Arnaud Démare (FRA)	+ 0"	Pascal Ackermann (GER)	+ 0"
Time trial	Stefan Küng (SUI)	30' 18"	Rémi Cavagna (FRA)	+ 17"	Victor Campenaerts (BEL)	+ 21"
Women's Elite Events
Road race	Annemiek van Vleuten (NED)	2h 50' 46"	Elisa Longo Borghini (ITA)	+ 0"	Katarzyna Niewiadoma (POL)	+ 6"
Time trial	Anna van der Breggen (NED)	34' 03"	Ellen van Dijk (NED)	+ 31"	Marlen Reusser (SUI)	+ 59"

== Under-23 ==
Event	Gold		Silver		Bronze	
Men's Under-23 Events
Road race	Jonas Hvideberg (NOR)	3h 11' 17"	Anthon Charmig (DEN)	+ 0"	Vojtěch Řepa (CZE)	+ 2"
Time trial	Andreas Leknessund (NOR)	30' 58"	Stefan Bissegger (SUI)	+ 23"	Ilan Van Wilder (BEL)	+ 28"
Women's Under-23 Events
Road race	Elisa Balsamo (ITA)	2h 15' 27"	Lonneke Uneken (NED)	+ 0"	Emma Cecilie Norsgaard (DEN)	+ 0"
Time trial	Hannah Ludwig (GER)	35' 53"	Franziska Koch (GER)	+ 24"	Marta Jaskulska (POL)	+ 1' 18"

== Junior ==
Event	Gold		Silver		Bronze	
Road race	Kasper Andersen (DEN)	2h 38' 28"	Pavel Bittner (CZE)	+ 0"	Arnaud de Lie (BEL)	+ 0"
Time trial	Mathias Vacek (CZE)	32' 39"	Marco Brenner (GER)	+ 3"	Lorenzo Milesi (ITA)	+ 17"
Women's Junior Events
Road race	Eleonora Gasparrini (ITA)	1h 54' 22"	Marith Vanhove (BEL)	+ 0"	Katrijn De Clercq (BEL)	+ 0"
Time trial	Elise Uijen (NED)	37' 24"	Maeva Squiban (FRA)	+ 1' 01"	Carlotta Cipressi (ITA)	+ 1' 28"

== Mixed Team Relay ==
Event	Gold		Silver		Bronze	
Time Trial	Germany	1h 14' 14"	Switzerland	+ 26"	Italy	+ 2' 35"
Time Trial	Lisa Brennauer; Lisa Klein; Mieke Kröger; Miguel Heidemann; Michel Hessmann; Justin Wolf		Elise Chabbey; Marlen Reusser; Kathrin Stirnemann; Stefan Bissegger; Robin Froidevaux; Claudio Imhof		Vittoria Bussi; Elena Cecchini; Vittoria Guazzini; Edoardo Affini; Liam Bertazzo; Davide Plebani	

== Overall medal table ==
* Host nation (Host nation (France))

Rank	Nation	Gold	Silver	Bronze	Total
1	Netherlands (NED)	3	2	0	5
2	Italy (ITA)	3	1	3	7
3	Germany (GER)	2	2	1	5
4	Norway (NOR)	2	0	0	2
5	Switzerland (SUI)	1	2	1	4
6	Czech Republic (CZE)	1	1	1	3
6	Denmark (DEN)	1	1	1	3
8	France (FRA)*	0	3	0	3
9	Belgium (BEL)	0	1	4	5
10	Poland (POL)	0	0	2	2
Totals (10 entries)		13	13	13	39
