= Elena Pirrone =

Italian cyclist

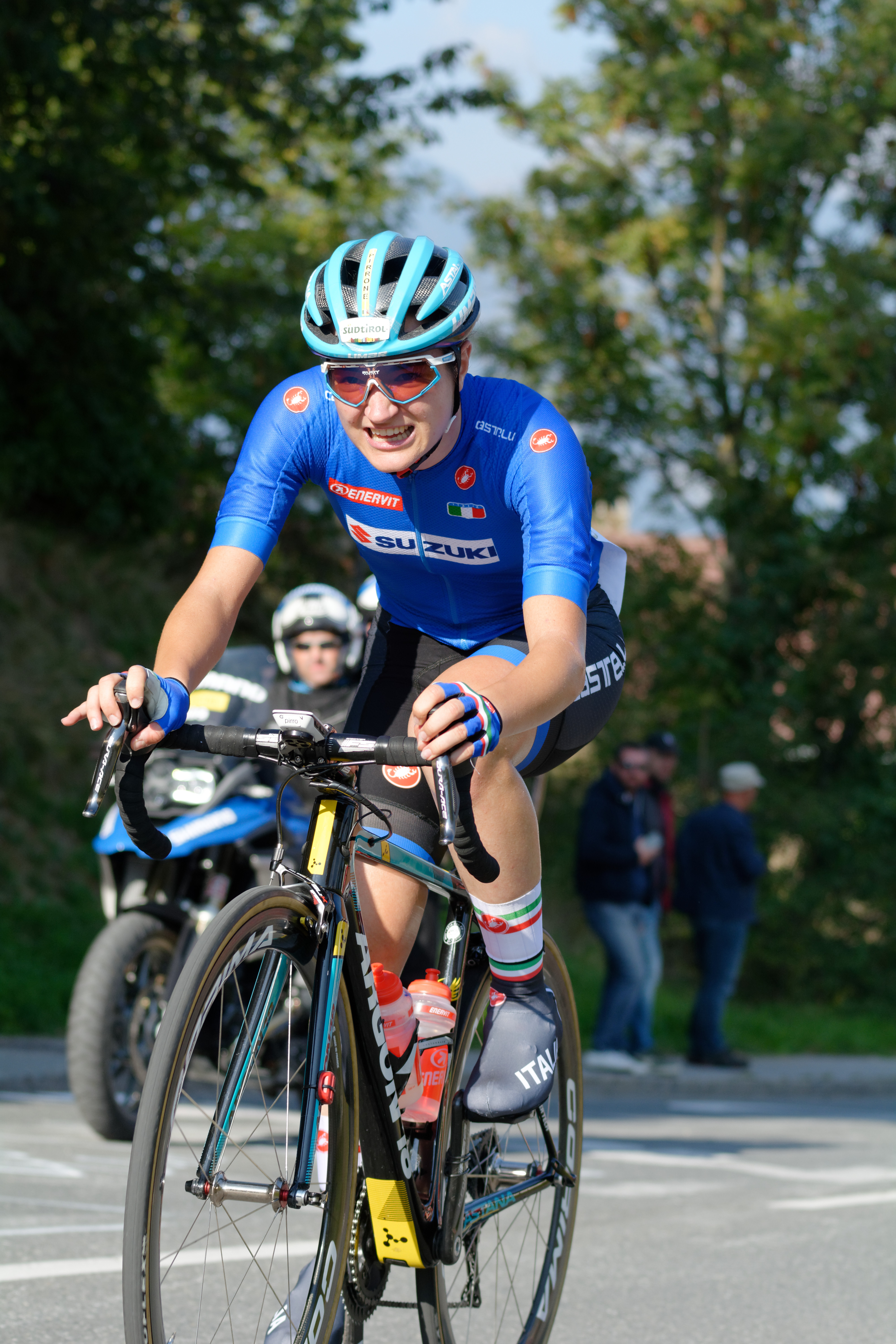
- Pirrone at the 2018 UCI Road World Championships

Personal information
- Full name: Elena Pirrone
- Born: 21 February 1999 (age 27) Bolzano, Italy

Cycling career
- Sport: Cycling
- Current team: Roland Le Dévoluy
- Discipline: Road
- Role: Rider
- Rider type: Time trialist

Professional teams
- 2018–2019: Astana
- 2019–2022: Valcar–Cylance
- 2023–: Israel Premier Tech Roland

Elena Pirrone (born 21 February 1999) is an Italian racing cyclist, who currently rides for UCI Women's WorldTeam Roland Le Dévoluy. At the 2017 UCI Road World Championships, Pirrone won both the women's junior road race and the women's junior time trial events.

== Major results ==
2016
10th Time trial, UCI Junior Road World Championships
2017
UCI Junior Road World Championships

1st Road race
1st Time trial

1st Time trial, UEC Junior European Championships
4th Coppa Sanremo in Fiore
2018
1st Overall Giro della Campania in Rosa

1st Stage 2

2nd Trofeo Ernesto Cavalli
2021
3rd Time trial, UEC European Under–23 Road Championships
2022
7th Tre Valli Varesine Women's Race
2023
1st Grand Prix Stuttgart & Region
6th Clasica Femenina Navarra
2024
2nd Grand Prix Surf City El Salvador
8th Vuelta CV Feminas
