= Lisa Morzenti =

Italian racing cyclist

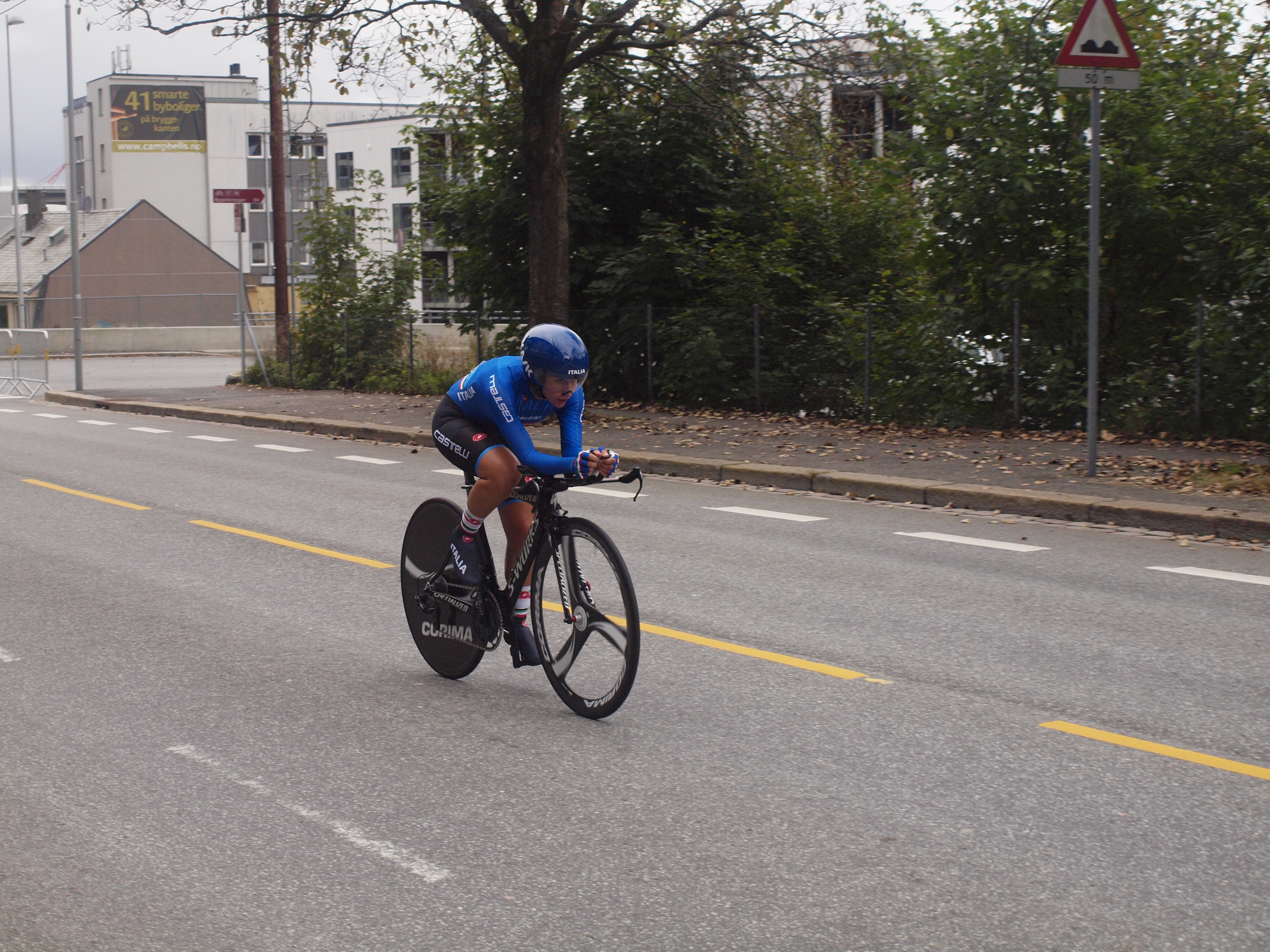
- Morzenti at the 2017 UCI Road World Championships

Personal information
- Full name: Lisa Morzenti
- Born: 23 January 1998 (age 28) Seriate, Italy

Cycling career
- Sport: Cycling
- Current team: Retired
- Discipline: Road
- Role: Rider

Professional teams
- 2017: Astana
- 2018: Bepink
- 2019: Eurotarget–Bianchi–Vittoria

Lisa Morzenti (born 23 January 1998) is an Italian former racing cyclist, who rode professionally between 2017 and 2019 for the Astana, Bepink and Eurotarget–Bianchi–Vittoria teams. She rode in the women's time trial event at the 2017 UCI Road World Championships.
