= 2017 European Road Championships =

- Location within Denmark
- Venue: Herning, Denmark
- Date: 2–6 August 2017
- Coordinates: 56°08′N 8°59′E
- Events: 12

The 2017 European Road Cycling Championships was the 23rd edition of the European Road Cycling Championships, and took place from 2 to 6 August 2017 in Herning, Denmark. The event consisted of a total of 6 road races and 6 time trials, regulated by the Union Européenne de Cyclisme (UEC).

== Schedule ==
=== Individual time trial ===
Date	Time	Event	Distance	Route
Wednesday 2 August	10:30	Women's junior	18.2 km (11.3 mi)	
Wednesday 2 August	12:45	Men's junior	31.5 km (19.6 mi)	
Wednesday 2 August	15:15	Women's under-23	31.5 km (19.6 mi)	
Thursday 3 August	9:30	Women's elite	31.5 km (19.6 mi)	
Thursday 3 August	12:15	Men's under-23	31.5 km (19.6 mi)	
Thursday 3 August	15:00	Men's elite	46.0 km (28.6 mi)	

=== Road race ===
Date	Time	Event	Distance	Laps	Route
Friday 4 August	9:00	Women's junior	60.3 km (37.5 mi)	3	
Friday 4 August	12:00	Women's under-23	100.5 km (62.4 mi)	5	
Friday 4 August	16:00	Men's junior	120.6 km (74.9 mi)	6	
Saturday 5 August	9:00	Men's under-23	160.8 km (99.9 mi)	8	
Saturday 5 August	14:00	Women's elite	120.6 km (74.9 mi)	6	
Sunday 6 August	11:00	Men's elite	241.2 km (149.9 mi)	12	

== Events summary ==
Event	Gold		Silver		Bronze	
Men's Elite Events
Road race	Alexander Kristoff (NOR)	5h 41' 10"	Elia Viviani (ITA)	s.t.	Moreno Hofland (NED)	s.t.
Time trial	Victor Campenaerts (BEL)	54'12"	Maciej Bodnar (POL)	+ 2"	Ryan Mullen (IRL)	+ 4"
Women's Elite Events
Road race	Marianne Vos (NED)	2h 51'13"	Giorgia Bronzini (ITA)	s.t.	Olga Zabelinskaya (RUS)	+ 2"
Time trial	Ellen van Dijk (NED)	40'33"	Ann-Sophie Duyck (BEL)	+ 58"	Anna van der Breggen (NED)	+ 1'04"
Men's Under-23 Events
Road race	Casper Pedersen (DEN)	3h 31'04"	Benoit Cosnefroy (FRA)	+ 02"	Marc Hirschi (CHE)	+ 02"
Time trial	Kasper Asgreen (DEN)	37'33"	Mikkel Bjerg (DEN)	+ 01"	Corentin Ermenault (FRA)	+ 22"
Women's Under-23 Events
Road race	Pernille Mathiesen (DEN)	2h 32'50"	Susanne Andersen (NOR)	+ 06"	Alice Barnes (GBR)	+ 06"
Time trial	Pernille Mathiesen (DEN)	41'29"	Cecilie Uttrup Ludwig (DEN)	+ 04"	Lisa Klein (GER)	+ 11"
Men's Junior Events
Road race	Michele Gazzoli (ITA)	2h 41'22"	Søren Wærenskjold (NOR)	s.t	Niklas Märkl (GER)	s.t
Time trial	Andreas Leknessund (NOR)	39'16"	Julius Johansen (DEN)	+ 14"	Sébastien Grignard (BEL)	+ 19"
Women's Junior Events
Road race	Lorena Wiebes (NED)	1h 32'21"	Emma Cecilie Norsgaard Jørgensen (DEN)	s.t.	Letizia Paternoster (ITA)	s.t.
Time trial	Elena Pirrone (ITA)	25'19"	Letizia Paternoster (ITA)	+ 08"	Emma Cecilie Norsgaard Jørgensen (DEN)	+ 11"

== Medal table ==
Rank	Nation	Gold	Silver	Bronze	Total
1	Denmark (DEN)	4	4	1	9
2	Netherlands (NED)	3	0	2	5
3	Italy (ITA)	2	3	1	6
4	Norway (NOR)	2	2	0	4
5	Belgium (BEL)	1	1	1	3
6	France (FRA)	0	1	1	2
7	Poland (POL)	0	1	0	1
8	Germany (GER)	0	0	2	2
9	Great Britain (GBR)	0	0	1	1
9	Ireland (IRL)	0	0	1	1
9	Russia (RUS)	0	0	1	1
9	Switzerland (CHE)	0	0	1	1
Totals (12 entries)		12	12	12	36
