= 2012 European Road Championships =

- Venue: Goes, Netherlands
- Date(s): 9–12 August 2013
- Events: 8

The 2012 European Road Championships were held in Goes, Netherlands, between 9 and 12 August 2012. The event consisted of a road race and a time trial for men and women under 23 and juniors. The championships were regulated by the European Cycling Union.

== Schedule ==
=== Time trial ===
Thursday 9 August

- 10 h 00 Men juniors, 24.9 km
- 15 h 00 Women under-23, 24.9 km

Friday 10 August

- 10 h 00 Women juniors, 14.8 km
- 15 h 00 Men under-23, 24.9 km

=== Road Race ===
Saturday 11 August

- 9 h 00 Men juniors, 129 km
- 14 h 00 Women under-23, 129 km

Sunday 12 August

- 10 h 00 Women juniors, 80 km
- 13 h 00 Men under-23, 172 km

== Results ==
Event	Gold		Silver		Bronze	
Men's Under-23 Events
Road race	Jan Tratnik; Slovenia	3 h 52 min 30 s	Andžs Flaksis; Latvia	+ 1 s	Wouter Wippert; Netherlands	+ 11 s
Time trial	Rasmus Christian Quaade; Denmark	28 min 59 s	Bob Jungels; Luxembourg	+ 23 s	Oleksandr Golovash; Ukraine	+ 32 s
Women's Under-23 Events
Road race	Evelyn Arys; Belgium	3 h 13 min 43 s	Barbara Guarischi; Italy	s.t.	Kim De Baat; Netherlands	s.t.
Time Trial	Anna van der Breggen; Netherlands	32 min 31 s	Mieke Kröger; Germany	+ 51 s	Elisa Longo Borghini; Italy	+ 54 s
Men's Junior Events
Road race	Alexander Wachter; Austria	2 h 59 min 22 s	Anthony Turgis; France	+ 1 s	Davide Ballerini; Italy	+ 11 s
Time Trial	Mathias Krigbaum; Denmark	30 min 15 s	Ryan Mullen; Ireland	+ 10 s	Matej Mohorič; Slovenia	+ 11 s
Women's Junior Events
Road race	Lucy Garner; United Kingdom	2 h 07 min 05 s	Anna Zita Maria Stricker; Italy	m.t.	Kirsten Coppens; Netherlands	s.t.
Time Trial	Corine van der Zijden; Netherlands	19 min 52 s	Kseniya Dobrynina; Russia	+ 8 s	Lotte Kopecky; Belgium	+ 10 s

== Medal table ==
Rank	Nation	Gold	Silver	Bronze	Total
1	Netherlands (NED)	2	0	3	5
2	Denmark (DEN)	2	0	0	2
3	Belgium (BEL)	1	0	1	2
3	Slovenia (SLO)	1	0	1	2
5	Austria (AUT)	1	0	0	1
5	Great Britain (GBR)	1	0	0	1
7	Italy (ITA)	0	2	2	4
8	France (FRA)	0	1	0	1
8	Germany (GER)	0	1	0	1
8	Ireland (IRL)	0	1	0	1
8	Latvia (LAT)	0	1	0	1
8	Luxembourg (LUX)	0	1	0	1
8	Russia (RUS)	0	1	0	1
14	Ukraine (UKR)	0	0	1	1
Totals (14 entries)		8	8	8	24
