= 2007 European Road Championships =

- Venue: Sofia, Bulgaria
- Date(s): 19–22 July 2007
- Events: 8

The 2007 European Road Championships were held in Sofia, Bulgaria, on 19–22 July 2007. Regulated by the European Cycling Union, the event consisted of a road race and a time trial for men and women under-23 and juniors.

== Schedule ==
=== Individual time trial ===
Thursday 19 July 2007

- Women U23, 24 km
- Men juniors, 24 km

Friday 20 July 2007

- Women juniors, 34 km
- Men U23, 12 km

=== Road race ===
Saturday 21 July 2007

- Women U23, 112 km
- Men juniors, 140 km

Sunday 22 July 2007

- Women juniors, 70 km
- Men U23, 168 km

== Events summary ==
Event	Gold		Silver		Bronze	
Men's under-23 events
Road race	Andrei Klyuev; Russia	3 h 54 min 49s	Ignatas Konovalovas; Lithuania	+ 2s	Normunds Lasis; Latvia	+ 13s
Time trial	Maxim Belkov; Russia	41 min 15s	Rein Taaramäe; Estonia	+ 6s	Adriano Malori; Italy	+ 17s
Women's under-23 events
Road race	Marianne Vos; Netherlands	3 h 02 min 54s	Marta Bastianelli; Italy	s.t.	Rasa Leleivytė; Lithuania	s.t.
Time trial	Linda Villumsen; Denmark	33 min 54s	Svitlana Halyuk; Ukraine	+ 37s	Martina Sáblíková; Czech Republic	+ 45s
Men's junior events
Road race	Michał Kwiatkowski; Poland	3 h 17 min 01s	Fabien Taillefer; France	s.t.	Ole Haavardsholm; Norway	s.t.
Time trial	Ilnur Zakarin; Russia	31 min 06s	Michał Kwiatkowski; Poland	+ 19s	Piotr Gawronski; Poland	+ 28s
Women's junior events
Road race	Valentina Scandolara; Italy	2 h 22 min 06s	Daria Gorbatovskaya; Russia	s.t.	Gloria Presti; Italy	s.t.
Time trial	Valeriya Kononenko; Ukraine	16 min 41s	Anne-Marie Schmitt; Luxembourg	+ 2s	Alena Amialiusik; Belarus	+ 28s

== Medal table ==
Rank	Nation	Gold	Silver	Bronze	Total
1	RUS	3	1	0	4
2	ITA	1	1	2	4
3	POL	1	1	1	3
4	UKR	1	1	0	2
5	DEN	1	0	0	1
5	NLD	1	0	0	1
7	LTU	0	1	1	2
8	EST	0	1	0	1
8	FRA	0	1	0	1
8	LUX	0	1	0	1
11	BLR	0	0	1	1
11	CZE	0	0	1	1
11	LAT	0	0	1	1
11	NOR	0	0	1	1
Totals (14 entries)		8	8	8	24
